= Speedy Gonzales filmography =

Speedy Gonzales has been featured in various media since his debut in 1953.

== Golden Age cartoons ==
 Legend

LT
stands for Looney Tunes
MM
stands for Merrie Melodies

=== 1953 ===
No.	Title	Original release date	Series	Directed by	Official DVD/Blu-Ray Availability	Notes
1	Cat-Tails for Two	August 29	MM	Robert McKimson	DVD: Looney Tunes Golden Collection: Volume 4; DVD: Looney Tunes: Spotlight Collection: Volume 8; Blu-Ray: Looney Tunes Collector's Vault: Volume 1	Features the Speedy Gonzales prototype; First Speedy Gonzales cartoon directed by Robert McKimson
=== 1955 ===
2	Speedy Gonzales	September 17	MM	Friz Freleng	DVD: Looney Tunes Golden Collection: Volume 1; DVD: Looney Tunes: Spotlight Collection: Volume 1; DVD: Warner Bros. Home Entertainment Academy Awards Animation Collection; Blu-Ray/DVD: Looney Tunes Platinum Collection: Volume 1	First pairing of Speedy Gonzales and Sylvester; First Speedy Gonzales cartoon directed by Friz Freleng; First appearance of the redesigned Speedy Gonzales; Won the Academy Award for Best Short Subject (Cartoon)
=== 1957 ===
3	Tabasco Road	July 20	LT	Robert McKimson	DVD: Looney Tunes Golden Collection: Volume 4; DVD: Warner Bros. Home Entertainment Academy Awards Animation Collection; Blu-Ray/DVD: Looney Tunes Platinum Collection: Volume 2	Nominated for Academy Award for Best Short Subject (Cartoon)
4	Gonzales' Tamales	November 30	LT	Friz Freleng	DVD: Looney Tunes Golden Collection: Volume 3; Blu-Ray: Looney Tunes Collector's Vault: Volume 1	with Sylvester
=== 1958 ===
5	Tortilla Flaps	January 18	LT	Robert McKimson	DVD: Looney Tunes Golden Collection: Volume 4	
=== 1959 ===
6	Mexicali Shmoes	July 4	LT	Friz Freleng	DVD: Looney Tunes Golden Collection: Volume 4; Blu-Ray/DVD: Looney Tunes Platinum Collection: Volume 2	Nominated for Academy Award for Best Short Subject (Cartoon)
7	Here Today, Gone Tamale	August 29	LT	Friz Freleng	DVD: Looney Tunes Golden Collection: Volume 4	with Sylvester
=== 1960 ===
8	West of the Pesos	January 23	MM	Robert McKimson	DVD: Looney Tunes Golden Collection: Volume 4	with Sylvester
=== 1961 ===
9	Cannery Woe	January 7	LT	Robert McKimson	DVD: Looney Tunes Golden Collection: Volume 4	with Sylvester
10	The Pied Piper of Guadalupe	August 19	LT	Friz Freleng and Hawley Pratt (co-director)	DVD: Looney Tunes Golden Collection: Volume 4; DVD: Looney Tunes: Spotlight Collection: Volume 8; Blu-Ray/DVD: Looney Tunes Platinum Collection: Volume 3	with Sylvester; Nominated for Academy Award for Best Short Subject (Cartoon)
=== 1962 ===
11	Mexican Boarders	May 12	LT	Friz Freleng	DVD: Looney Tunes Golden Collection: Volume 4; Blu-Ray: Looney Tunes Collector's Vault: Volume 2	with Sylvester
=== 1963 ===
12	Mexican Cat Dance	April 20	LT	Friz Freleng	Currently Unavailable	with Sylvester
13	Chili Weather	August 17	MM	Friz Freleng	DVD: Looney Tunes Golden Collection: Volume 4	with Sylvester
=== 1964 ===
14	A Message to Gracias	February 8	LT	Robert McKimson	DVD: Looney Tunes Golden Collection: Volume 4	with Sylvester
15	Nuts and Volts	April 25	LT	Friz Freleng	DVD: Looney Tunes Golden Collection: Volume 4	with Sylvester; Final Speedy Gonzales cartoon produced by Warner Bros. Cartoons
16	Pancho's Hideaway	October 24	LT	Friz Freleng and Hawley Pratt (co-director)	DVD: Looney Tunes Golden Collection: Volume 4	First cartoon produced by DePatie–Freleng Enterprises
17	Road to Andalay	December 26	MM	Friz Freleng and Hawley Pratt (co-director)	Blu-Ray: Looney Tunes Collector's Choice: Volume 4	with Sylvester
=== 1965 ===
18	It's Nice to Have a Mouse Around the House	January 16	LT	Friz Freleng and Hawley Pratt (co-director)	Blu-Ray/DVD: Looney Tunes Mouse Chronicles: The Chuck Jones Collection (bonus feature, unrestored)	with Daffy Duck, Sylvester, and Granny; First pairing of Speedy Gonzales and Daffy Duck
19	Cats and Bruises	January 30	MM	Friz Freleng and Hawley Pratt (co-director)	Currently Unavailable	with Sylvester; Final cartoon in which Sylvester speaks
20	The Wild Chase	February 27	MM	Friz Freleng and Hawley Pratt (co-director)	DVD: Looney Tunes Golden Collection: Volume 4	with Sylvester, Wile E. Coyote and the Road Runner; Only pairing of Speedy Gonzales and Wile E. Coyote and the Road Runner; Final Speedy Gonzales cartoon directed by Friz Freleng
21	Moby Duck	March 27	LT	Robert McKimson	Currently Unavailable	with Daffy Duck
22	Assault and Peppered	April 24	MM	Robert McKimson	Currently Unavailable	with Daffy Duck
23	Well Worn Daffy	May 22	LT	Robert McKimson	Currently Unavailable	with Daffy Duck
24	Chili Corn Corny	October 23	LT	Robert McKimson	Currently Unavailable	with Daffy Duck
25	Go Go Amigo	November 20	MM	Robert McKimson	Currently Unavailable	with Daffy Duck
=== 1966 ===
26	The Astroduck	January 1	LT	Robert McKimson	Currently Unavailable	with Daffy Duck
27	Mucho Locos	February 5	MM	Robert McKimson	Currently Unavailable	with Daffy Duck and Porky Pig; Only pairing of Speedy Gonzales and Porky Pig; Utilizes recycled animation from Robin Hood Daffy, Tortilla Flaps, Deduce, You Say!, Mexicali Shmoes, and China Jones.
28	Mexican Mousepiece	February 26	MM	Robert McKimson	Currently Unavailable	with Daffy Duck
29	Daffy Rents	March 26	LT	Robert McKimson	Currently Unavailable	with Daffy Duck
30	A-Haunting We Will Go	April 16	LT	Robert McKimson	DVD: Looney Tunes Golden Collection: Volume 4; Blu-Ray/DVD: Looney Tunes Platinum Collection: Volume 1	with Daffy Duck and Witch Hazel; Only pairing of Speedy Gonzales and Witch Hazel
31	Snow Excuse	May 21	MM	Robert McKimson	Currently Unavailable	with Daffy Duck
32	A Squeak in the Deep	July 19	LT	Robert McKimson	Currently Unavailable	with Daffy Duck
33	Feather Finger	August 20	MM	Robert McKimson	Currently Unavailable	with Daffy Duck
34	Swing Ding Amigo	September 17	LT	Robert McKimson	Currently Unavailable	with Daffy Duck
35	A Taste of Catnip	December 3	MM	Robert McKimson	Currently Unavailable	with Daffy Duck and Sylvester; Final appearance of Sylvester
=== 1967 ===
36	Daffy's Diner	January 21	MM	Robert McKimson	Currently Unavailable	with Daffy Duck; Final Speedy Gonzales cartoon directed by Robert McKimson; Final cartoon produced by DePatie–Freleng Enterprises
37	Quacker Tracker	April 29	LT	Rudy Larriva	Currently Unavailable	with Daffy Duck; First of three Speedy Gonzales cartoons directed by Rudy Larriva and produced by Format Productions
38	The Music Mice-Tro	May 27	MM	Rudy Larriva	Currently Unavailable	with Daffy Duck
39	The Spy Swatter	June 24	LT	Rudy Larriva	Currently Unavailable	with Daffy Duck; Final of three Speedy Gonzales cartoons directed by Rudy Larriva and produced by Format Productions
40	Speedy Ghost to Town	July 29	MM	Alex Lovy	Currently Unavailable	with Daffy Duck; First Speedy Gonzales cartoon directed by Alex Lovy; First Speedy Gonzales cartoon produced by Warner Bros.–Seven Arts Animation
41	Rodent to Stardom	September 23	LT	Alex Lovy	Currently Unavailable	with Daffy Duck
42	Go Away Stowaway	September 30	MM	Alex Lovy	Currently Unavailable	with Daffy Duck
43	Fiesta Fiasco	December 9	LT	Alex Lovy	Currently Unavailable	with Daffy Duck
=== 1968 ===
44	Skyscraper Caper	March 9	LT	Alex Lovy	Currently Unavailable	with Daffy Duck
45	See Ya Later Gladiator	June 29	LT	Alex Lovy	Currently Unavailable	Final appearance of Speedy Gonzales and Daffy Duck; Final theatrical Daffy Duck cartoon until 1987; Final Speedy Gonzales cartoon directed by Alex Lovy; Final Speedy Gonzales cartoon produced by Warner Bros.–Seven Arts Animation

== Post-Golden Age media ==
=== 1979 ===
- The Fright Before Christmas

=== 1980 ===
- The Chocolate Chase - Starring Daffy Duck.

=== 1988 ===
- Who Framed Roger Rabbit (feature film)

=== 1996 ===
- Space Jam (feature film)

=== 2000 ===
- Tweety's High-Flying Adventure (direct-to-video feature film)

=== 2003 ===
- Looney Tunes: Back in Action (feature film)

=== 2015 ===
- Looney Tunes: Rabbits Run (direct-to-video feature film)

=== 2021 ===
- Space Jam: A New Legacy (feature film)

=== 2026 ===
- Daffy Season - Starring Daffy Duck.
