= This Is a Life? =

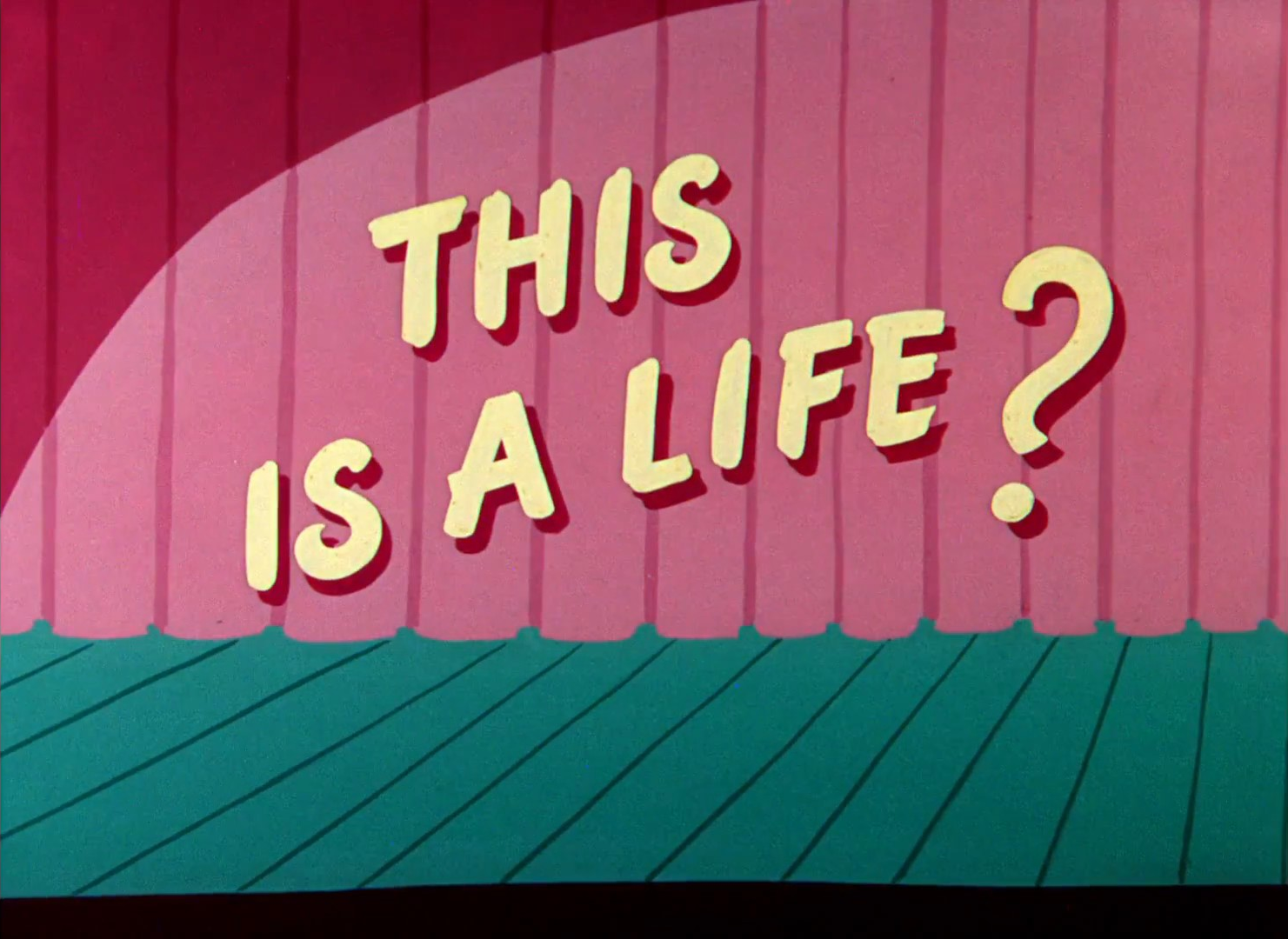
- Title card
- Directed by: I. Freleng
- Story by: Warren Foster
- Starring: Mel Blanc
- Music by: Milt Franklyn
- Animation by: Ted Bonnicksen; Arthur Davis
- Layouts by: Hawley Pratt
- Backgrounds by: Irv Wyner
- Color process: Technicolor
- Production company: Warner Bros. Cartoons
- Distributed by: Warner Bros. Pictures; The Vitaphone Corporation
- Release date: July 9, 1955 (US)
- Running time: 7:03
- Language: English

This Is a Life? is a 1955 Warner Bros. Merrie Melodies animated cartoon directed by Friz Freleng and written by Warren Foster, with music directed by Milt Franklyn. The short was released on July 9, 1955, and stars Bugs Bunny, Elmer Fudd, Yosemite Sam and Daffy Duck. The voices were performed by Mel Blanc, Arthur Q. Bryan, and June Foray in her first work for Warner Bros. This is one of the few Bugs Bunny cartoons whose title does not contain Bugs, bunny, rabbit/wabbit or hare.

This is one of the only two Warner Bros. shorts in the original classic era of Looney Tunes (the other being A Star Is Bored) in which Bugs is paired with his main three antagonists. This is also the first time that June Foray provides the voice of Granny, which Foray would then continue to voice for nearly 60 years.

== Plot ==
In a parody of This Is Your Life, Elmer Fudd (aping Ralph Edwards) is the host and Bugs Bunny is the guest of honor, much to the shock and disgust of Daffy Duck. Granny, who is sitting next to Daffy and trying to watch the program, hits him on the head with the handle of her umbrella to keep him quiet after being irritated with him ranting about not being the "guest of honor". Daffy goes out of his way to try to sabotage Bugs by making irate comments about him and goading Elmer to throw Bugs out. Each time, Granny becomes increasingly enraged by him out of disgust that he’s being a very bad sport over not having the spotlight and irritation over the fact that he’s being very annoying until she finally hits Daffy on the head with the handle of her umbrella and angrily tells him to "Shut up!".

Meanwhile, Bugs reminisces about his childhood and then with Elmer and Yosemite Sam about his previous encounters with both of them (reviewed via stock footage from the past Bugs Bunny cartoons A Hare Grows in Manhattan, Hare Do and Buccaneer Bunny), with the last two showing Bugs getting the best of them, as usual.

Elmer and Sam plan to finally get even with Bugs by presenting him with a special "gift" — a time bomb wrapped up in a box — in appreciation of their "friendship". However, a jealous Daffy, who stubbornly refuses to accept that he is NOT the guest of honor, grabs the gift after a bout with the three of them passing it off to each other shouting “I’LL TAKE IT!”. Sam, Elmer and Bugs cover their ears as they know what the gift really is — but not Daffy, who says "After all, this should've been mine anyway! I really deserve it!" (how true) — and takes the resulting explosion backstage. Naturally, Daffy angrily returns and ends up telling Bugs: "You're... You're... You're despicable!", then leaves the stage in a huff.

== Voice cast and additional crew ==
- Mel Blanc as Bugs Bunny, Daffy Duck, Yosemite Sam and Announcer
- Arthur Q. Bryan as Elmer Fudd (uncredited)
- June Foray as Granny (uncredited)
- Film Edited by Treg Brown (uncredited)
- Original Story by Michael Maltese and Tedd Pierce (both uncredited)
- Archive Backgrounds by Paul Julian and Philip DeGuard (both uncredited)

== Music ==
The cartoon uses arranged music for the opening title card and the introductory credits before showing the title of the picture.

== Home media ==
This Is a Life? is featured uncut on the Looney Tunes Super Stars DVD, Daffy Duck: Frustrated Fowl. However, it was cropped down to widescreen format, which caused anger among most Looney Tunes fans and collectors. It was later re-released in its original aspect ratio on the Bugs Bunny 80th Anniversary Collection Blu-ray set.

== See also ==
- Looney Tunes and Merrie Melodies filmography (1950–1959)
- List of Bugs Bunny cartoons
- List of Yosemite Sam cartoons

Preceded by Rabbit Rampage	Bugs Bunny Cartoons; 1955	Succeeded by Hyde and Hare
