= The Porky Pig Show =

- Genre: Comedy
- Country of origin: United States
- Original language: English
- No. of seasons: 1
- No. of episodes: 26

Production
- Running time: 30 minutes
- Production companies: Warner Bros. Television; Shorts: Warner Bros. Cartoons

Original release
- Network: ABC
- Release: September 20, 1964 – September 2, 1967

The Porky Pig Show is an American animated television anthology series hosted by Porky Pig, that was composed of Looney Tunes and Merrie Melodies theatrical cartoons made between 1948 and 1964. The series aired on ABC Saturday mornings from 1964 to 1967, with 26 half-hour episodes created. The character of Porky Pig was voiced by Mel Blanc. The show occasionally aired in the early 2000s as part of Cartoon Network's Boomerang 1964 block (on both channels), as well rerunning on Canal 5 in Mexico in the 2010s.

== Format ==
Each show began with a newly animated title sequence featuring a theme song by Barbara Cameron, in which Porky welcomes his friends (known Looney Tunes stars such as Bugs Bunny, Daffy Duck, Sylvester, Tweety; an antropomorphic dog band led by Yosemite Sam; and some local kids) into a barn to dance and watch his show. Following the three cartoons featured on the program (the first one always featuring Porky, and few of which would be featured on any incarnation of The Bugs Bunny Show until the 1990s), a closing sequence played in which Porky's friends say goodbye and promise to return the following week. At every episode's closing segment, Porky had stutteringly remarked, "That's all folks".

The opening and closing segments were produced by Hal Seeger Productions. Warner Bros. Pictures had shut down their own cartoon studio in the previous year. Some intermission segments between cartoons were altered fragments from other Porky cartoons (usually just given new dialogs), and others contained entirely new animations.

== Episodes ==
No.	1st cartoon	2nd cartoon	3rd cartoon	Original air date
1	Often an Orphan	Mice Follies	The Super Snooper	September 20, 1964
2	Awful Orphan	Bell Hoppy	Wild Wife	September 27, 1964
3	Scaredy Cat	Baton Bunny	Feather Dusted	October 4, 1964
4	The Wearing of the Grin	The Unexpected Pest	Which is Witch？	October 11, 1964
5	Thumb Fun	Ready, Woolen and Able	Wise Quackers	October 18, 1964
6	The Prize Pest	Room and Bird	Early to Bet	October 25, 1964
7	Drip-Along Daffy	Too Hop to Handle	Chow Hound	November 1, 1964
8	The Pest That Came to Dinner	Goldimouse and the Three Cats	Two Crows from Tacos	November 8, 1964
9	Dog Collared	Strife with Father	Feline Frame-Up	November 15, 1964
10	My Little Duckaroo	A Fox in a Fix	Much Ado About Nutting	November 22, 1964
11	Fool Coverage	The Bee-Deviled Bruin	Go Fly a Kit	November 29, 1964
12	Bye, Bye Bluebeard	The Lion's Busy	Speedy Gonzales	December 6, 1964
13	An Egg Scramble	Mouse and Garden	Punch Trunk	December 13, 1964
14	Dime to Retire	Bad Ol' Putty Tat	Kiss Me Cat	December 20, 1964
15	Jumpin' Jupiter	A Hound for Trouble	Of Rice and Hen	December 27, 1964
16	Boston Quackie	A Bear for Punishment	The EGGcited Rooster	January 3, 1965
17	Porky Chops	It's Hummer Time	Mouse Warming	January 10, 1965
18	Boobs in the Woods	The Hypo-Chondri-Cat	Mixed Master	January 17, 1965
19	Riff Raffy Daffy	Swallow the Leader	Three Little Bops	January 24, 1965
20	Dough for the Do-Do	Gopher Broke	Pizzicato Pussycat	January 31, 1965
21	Duck Dodgers in the 24½th Century	Sleepy Time Possum	The Honey-Mousers	February 7, 1965
22	Paying the Piper	Caveman Inki	Lumber Jerks	February 14, 1965
23	Deduce, You Say	Heir-Conditioned	Cat's Paw	February 21, 1965
24	Rocket Squad	By Word of Mouse	West of the Pesos	February 28, 1965
25	China Jones	Rabbit Rampage	Mouse Mazurka	March 7, 1965
26	Cracked Quack	A Ham in a Role	Sheep Ahoy	March 14, 1965

== Home media ==
Episode #1 of The Porky Pig Show was released on DVD, as part of Warner Home Video's Saturday Morning Cartoons: 1960s, Volume 1 two-disc set, on May 26, 2009. Episode #3 was included in Saturday Morning Cartoons: 1960s, Volume 2, released on October 27, 2009.
