= Roman Legion-Hare =

1955 film by Friz Freleng

- Title card
- Directed by: Friz Freleng
- Story by: Warren Foster
- Starring: Mel Blanc
- Music by: Milt Franklyn
- Animation by: Virgil Ross; Art Davis; Gerry Chiniquy
- Layouts by: Hawley Pratt
- Backgrounds by: Irv Wyner
- Color process: Technicolor
- Production company: Warner Bros. Cartoons
- Distributed by: Warner Bros. Pictures
- Release date: November 12, 1955
- Running time: 7:09
- Language: English

Roman Legion-Hare is a 1955 Warner Bros. Looney Tunes animated short directed by Friz Freleng. The short was released on November 12, 1955, and stars Bugs Bunny and Yosemite Sam. The title is a play on the words Roman Legionnaire. After being ordered by Emperor Nero to find a victim to be tossed to the lions, Yosemite Sam tries to capture Bugs Bunny.

== Plot ==
Set against the backdrop of Rome in 54 A.D., a poster at the Coliseum advertises the Detroit lions in their season opener. A sportscaster describes the scene as Emperor Nero enters the arena in a chariot with tail fins. Nero is to throw out the first victim, but it turns out they are all out of victims. Nero commands Captain of the Guard Yosemite Sam to find one, lest he become a victim himself.

Bugs Bunny thinks Sam and his legion marching behind him are a parade and runs up to watch them. They chase Bugs but he outruns them. Sam chases Bugs into the Coliseum. As Sam passes a lion cage, he clubs the resident lion on the head and yells at it to shut up. Bugs opens its door, and after Sam gets away from this mauling, he chases Bugs into another room of dormant lions. They tiptoe through this room, but when Bugs climbs out he quickly lowers an alarm clock to wake the angered lions, who then maul Sam again. When he gets out this time by grabbing the room's sewer cover and bashing it into the lions to stop them from escaping, he sees Bugs on the other side of the pit. The lions all look up angrily at Sam, whom they all hate for clubbing them, stuffing and beating them into the room with the sewer cover and mistakenly waking them up. He grabs some stilts and clubs a lion on the head yet again to try to stop them from grabbing him, but when he's halfway across, Bugs tosses some saws and axes to the lions. As Sam tries to return to safety, his stilts get shorter and shorter and the lions maul him yet again.

Bugs hides behind another door, but instead of opening it, Sam locks the door to the center of the arena. Sam brags to Nero about finding him a victim and Nero orders the lions be released. However, the angry lions run right past Bugs and head for Sam and Nero. They climb a nearby column as Bugs dons a laurel wreath and proclaims, "Well, as the Romans say, E Pluribus Uranium." Nero plays "Taps" on his violin as the lions break down the column to Sam and Nero's eventual doom.

== Home media ==
Roman Legion-Hare was released on the Bugs Bunny's Wacky Adventures VHS as part of the Golden Jubilee 24 Carrot Collection video set. The short is also part of the Looney Tunes Golden Collection: Volume 4 DVD set.

== See also ==
- Looney Tunes
- Looney Tunes and Merrie Melodies filmography (1950–1959)
- List of Bugs Bunny cartoons
- List of Yosemite Sam cartoons

Preceded by Knight-mare Hare	Bugs Bunny Cartoons; 1955	Succeeded by Bugs' Bonnets
