= Mexicali Shmoes =

- Title card
- Directed by: Friz Freleng
- Story by: Warren Foster
- Starring: Mel Blanc; Dal McKennon
- Edited by: Treg Brown
- Music by: Milt Franklyn
- Animation by: Virgil Ross; Gerry Chiniquy; Art Davis
- Layouts by: Hawley Pratt
- Backgrounds by: Tom O'Loughlin
- Color process: Technicolor
- Production company: Warner Bros. Cartoons
- Distributed by: Warner Bros. Pictures; The Vitaphone Corporation
- Release date: July 4, 1959
- Running time: 6 minutes
- Language: English

Mexicali Shmoes is a 1959 Warner Bros. Looney Tunes cartoon short directed by Friz Freleng. The short was released on July 4, 1959, and stars Speedy Gonzales and the singing cats Jose and Manuel. Voice actors include Mel Blanc as the voices of Speedy Gonzales and Jose plus an uncredited Dal McKennon as the voice of Manuel.

The Academy Award-nominated cartoon has Jose and Manuel chasing Speedy Gonzales in Mexico. This cartoon introduces Slowpoke Rodriguez, Speedy's cousin. Slowpoke would appear in only one other classic Looney Tunes short, 1962's Mexican Boarders.

== Plot ==
Two sombrero-wearing cats, Jose and Manuel, are singing while relaxing on the "Avenida de Gatos" when they are taunted by Speedy Gonzales. After Manuel fails to catch Speedy, Jose informs Manuel that Speedy is "the fastest mouse in all Mexico" and that they will have to use their brains, not their feet, to catch him. The pair set off for Speedy's home in Guadalajara where they again fail to capture him. During their struggles, Manuel gets hit on the head by Jose with a guitar, Jose hooks Speedy with a fishing line and gets towed to Los Angeles, Manuel gets blown up by dynamite, and both cats get blown up in a minefield that they constructed.

Jose and Manuel are sitting on top of a wall after failing to outsmart and catch Speedy. Manuel laments they should have gone after Speedy's cousin, Slowpoke Rodriguez, the "slowest mouse in all Mexico". Jose is convinced to go after him and runs off. Manuel desperately tries to catch up to warn him about Slowpoke and his reputation. No sooner than Jose arrives at the mouse house and catches him, Slowpoke shoots him. Manuel finally catches up and tells Jose exactly what he was trying to warn him about Slowpoke: "He pack a gun". Slowpoke blows steam off his gun and returns to his mouse hole, leaving the charred Jose to lament, "Now he tolls me."

== Reception ==
Animation historian David Gerstein writes, "In Mexicali Shmoes, stocky Jose is more serious and calculating than geeky Manuel, but in their attempts to catch Speedy Gonzales, both cats provide equal hilarity. The treatment easily transcends the characters' feline nature and Mexican culture: Rocky and Mugsy (Bugs and Thugs) and Henry Bear and Junyer (A Bear for Punishment) follow flawlessly in the same tradition. It's amazing how, outside of Warner Bros., so many cartoon studios' straight man-funny man pairings flopped."

== Home media ==
Mexicali Shmoes is available on disc 3 of Looney Tunes Golden Collection: Volume 4 and disc 1 of Looney Tunes Platinum Collection: Volume 2.

== Awards and honors ==
- Mexicali Shmoes was nominated in the Best Short Subjects, Cartoons category at the 32nd Academy Awards in 1959.

== See also ==
- List of American films of 1959
