= Hare-Less Wolf =

- Lobby card
- Directed by: Friz Freleng
- Story by: Warren Foster
- Starring: Mel Blanc; June Foray (uncredited)
- Edited by: Treg Brown
- Music by: Milt Franklyn
- Animation by: Gerry Chiniquy; Art Davis; Virgil Ross
- Layouts by: Hawley Pratt
- Backgrounds by: Boris Gorelick
- Color process: Technicolor
- Production company: Warner Bros. Cartoons
- Distributed by: Warner Bros. Pictures
- Release date: February 1, 1958
- Running time: 6:45
- Language: English

Hare-Less Wolf is a Warner Bros. Merrie Melodies cartoon directed by Friz Freleng, released on February 1, 1958, starring Bugs Bunny.

Mel Blanc voices Bugs and the absent-minded wolf character, Charles M. Wolf, who previously appeared in the Looney Tunes short Red Riding Hoodwinked (also directed by Freleng) alongside Granny, Tweety and Sylvester, where he was simply known as the Big Bad Wolf. An uncredited June Foray voices the wolf's wife, who appears in a brief scene at the beginning of the cartoon. John Burton Sr. produced the film.

== Plot ==
Charles M. Wolf is in his cave watching a baseball game on TV. Suddenly his wife bursts in and demands that he hunt a rabbit. Charles goes right away, rifle in hand while muttering to the audience that he hates his wife. He gets a skillet tossed at his head.

Bugs Bunny catches Charles running and while running alongside, he asks him what the rush is. When asked if he's hunting for something, Charlie forgets what it is and Bugs openly guesses a rabbit. Charles shoots at Bugs, but Bugs dodges the shots and in a minute or two causes him to whack himself with his gun. Bugs tests the gun for any faults, but as he shoots Charles in the face, he concludes Charles is just a bad shot. Charles starts chasing Bugs around a tree and Bugs does another round of questions as Charles has forgotten it's a rabbit he's after. As Charles recalls, Bugs trips him over.

Bugs dives into his hole and leaves out a box. Charles finds inside it a hand grenade. Charlie reads a set of instructions to operate the grenade but takes too long after pulling the pin and it explodes in his face. Charles chases Bugs into a railroad tunnel. Charles runs out thinking a train is coming, but it's just Bugs holding a flashlight and blowing into a whistle. Having wised up, Charlie chases Bugs back into the tunnel, but a real train comes out of the tunnel and runs him over. Charles wonders why he ever wanted to catch a train.

Out of his hole, Bugs lights a nearby fuse and Charles curiously follows it. At the end of the fuse, Charles gets in the way of an explosive gunpowder keg, which blows up.

Bugs then builds a door on a plank of wood stretching out from a cliff. Charles demands to be let in and when Bugs refuses, he burst in and plummets off the cliff lying on the falling door. As Charles crashes into the ravine below, the impact also makes Bugs almost fall off the plank, but Bugs was able to hoist himself back up. Charles (now furious) rushes back up to Bugs and breathes heavily on Bugs' fur. Once again Charles forgets what he came after. This time Bugs then decides not to remind him and tells Charles to let him know when he finally finds out, leaving Charles to continue to guess.

Hours later into the night, way past dinnertime, Charles is sitting on a rock, still trying to remember what it was he was chasing. Bugs emerges from his hole in his night attire, holding a candle and he bids the audience goodnight.

Preceded by Rabbit Romeo	Bugs Bunny Cartoons; 1958	Succeeded by Hare-Way to the Stars
