= Pizzicato Pussycat =

- Title card
- Directed by: I. Freleng
- Story by: Warren Foster
- Starring: Mel Blanc; Marian Richman; Norman Nesbitt
- Narrated by: Norman Nesbitt
- Music by: Milt Franklyn
- Animation by: Virgil Ross; Manuel Perez
- Layouts by: Hawley Pratt
- Backgrounds by: Richard H. Thomas
- Color process: Color
- Production company: Warner Bros. Cartoons
- Distributed by: Warner Bros. Pictures
- Release date: January 1, 1955
- Running time: 7:20
- Language: English

Pizzicato Pussycat is a Warner Bros. Merrie Melodies animated short directed by Friz Freleng, released on January 1, 1955. The first half of the title is a playing technique for string instruments (such as guitars, violins, violas, cellos, and double basses) that involves plucking instead of using a bow (for the lattermost), and also serves as an allusion to the theme of the short.

== Plot ==
Mr. and Mrs. Jones, a suburban couple, are puzzled by mysterious piano music in their home, long after their daughter's toy piano vanished. The music is revealed to come from the toy piano, played by a mouse. The Joneses' pet cat initially wants to prey on the mouse, but the mouse strikes a deal with the cat, promising a piano performance in exchange for the mouse's life. The cat hides the mouse and toy piano in the real piano while the cat pretends to play, deceiving the Joneses. Mrs. Jones calls the press, and media frenzy ensues, with scientists baffled by the cat's musical talent despite scans revealing the cat's brain to be peanut-sized. Contracts are signed for public performances, culminating in a disastrous show at Carnegie Hall when the cat presses one of the piano's keys leading to the piano hammer inadvertently breaking the mouse's glasses, thus hindering the mouse's ability to read the notes. Exposed as a fraud, the cat and mouse revert to their usual antics until they bond over jazz music with the cat realizing that the cat is talented with the drums, and the mouse being inspired to play the piano with the cat as a duet. Upon seeing the recent events, Mrs. Jones decides to call the press again, but Mr. Jones objects, unwilling to go through the same hassle again. The couple keep the extraordinary animals a secret and enjoy the music to themselves.

== Music ==
- "Waltz Op. 64 No. 1 in D flat major" aka "Minute Waltz" by Frédéric Chopin
- "Crazy Rhythm" by Joseph Meyer and Roger Wolfe Kahn
- "Me-ow" by Mel B. Kaufman
- "Home Sweet Home" aka "There's No Place Like Home", by H.R. Bishop
- "Liebestraum No. 3" by Franz Liszt
- "Hungarian Rhapsody No. 14" by Franz Liszt

== Home media ==
Pizzicato Pussycat is available on the Looney Tunes Golden Collection: Volume 4 Disc 4, and on the Looney Tunes Collector's Vault: Volume 3 Disc 2.

== See also ==
- List of American films of 1955
