= To Hare Is Human =

To Hare is Human
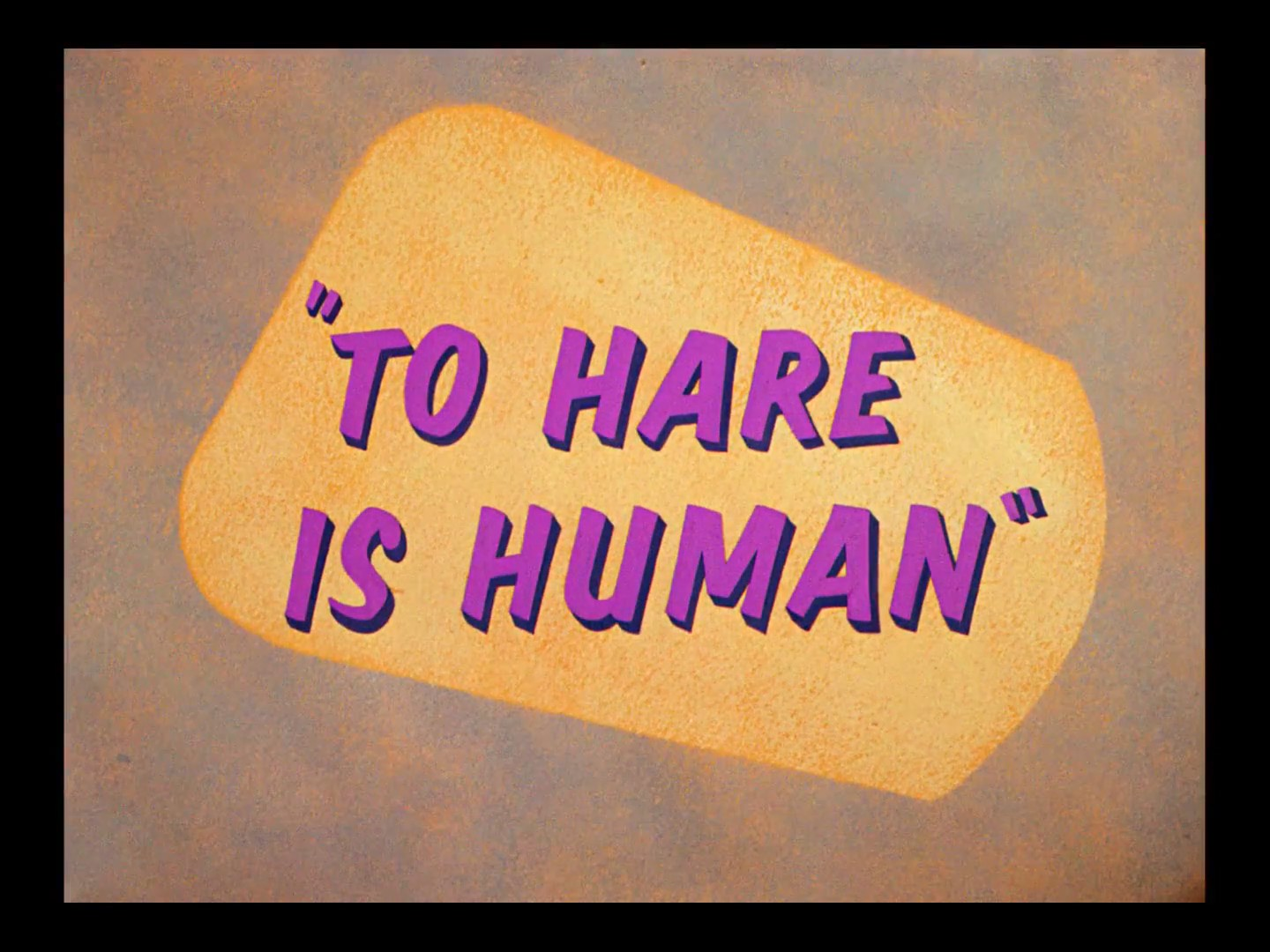
- Title card
- Directed by: Chuck Jones
- Story by: Michael Maltese
- Starring: Mel Blanc
- Edited by: Treg Brown
- Music by: Milt Franklyn
- Animation by: Abe Levitow; Richard Thompson; Ken Harris; Ben Washam
- Layouts by: Maurice Noble
- Backgrounds by: Philip DeGuard
- Color process: Technicolor
- Production company: Warner Bros. Cartoons
- Distributed by: Warner Bros. Pictures; The Vitaphone Corporation
- Release date: December 15, 1956
- Running time: 6:59
- Language: English

To Hare is Human is a 1956 Warner Bros. Merrie Melodies cartoon directed by Chuck Jones. The short was released on December 15, 1956, and stars Bugs Bunny and Wile E. Coyote. In this film, Wile builds a UNIVAC computer, and grows to rely on its answers.

== Plot ==
Wile E. Coyote employs a series of increasingly elaborate schemes to capture Bugs Bunny, utilizing a foldable elevator and a super smart computer called UNIVAC. In one scenario, Wile E. Coyote ensnares Bugs Bunny in a sack rigged with dynamite but is outsmarted when Bugs escapes, causing an explosion that buys him time to flee. Undeterred, Wile E. Coyote utilizes the UNIVAC to devise new strategies, each met with humorous failure.

First, Wile E. attempts to unlock Bugs' rabbit hole using the UNIVAC's guidance, only to slip on a banana peel and plummet off a cliff. In another attempt, he substitutes hand grenades for Bugs' breakfast carrots, but the plan backfires when the grenades are launched back at him. A subsequent effort involving a bathroom plunger leads to Wile E. being sucked into his own trap.

In a fourth endeavor, Wile E. inserts dynamite into Bugs' vacuum cleaner, resulting in a comedic explosion when Bugs inadvertently reignites the fuse. Finally, Wile E. sets a booby trap in the carrot patch, but it backfires, leading to his own demise. The revelation that Bugs Bunny is the true mastermind behind the UNIVAC's calculations adds a humorous twist to the failed attempts, highlighting Bugs' cleverness and Wile E. Coyote's perpetual misfortune.

== Production notes ==
The title is a play on the expression, "To err is human, to forgive divine" from Alexander Pope's poem An Essay on Criticism, as well as the same Latin proverb "Errare humanum est" translated into English." This was also the final cartoon to be made at Termite Terrace before the studio moved to the Burbank lot.

== Home media ==
The short was released on the Looney Tunes Golden Collection: Volume 4, Disc One.

Preceded by Wideo Wabbit	Bugs Bunny Cartoons; 1956	Succeeded by Ali Baba Bunny
