= Looney Tunes Golden Collection: Volume 4 =

2006 American DVD box set

- DVD cover
- Directed by: Frank Tashlin; Friz Freleng; Chuck Jones; Robert McKimson; Hawley Pratt; Bob Clampett; Arthur Davis
- Produced by: Leon Schlesinger; Eddie Selzer; John W. Burton; David H. DePatie; Friz Freleng
- Starring: the voices of Mel Blanc; June Foray; Ralph James; Stan Freberg; Pinto Colvig; Billy Bletcher; Joe Dougherty; Kent Rogers; Robert C. Bruce; Tedd Pierce; Bernice Hansen; Marian Richman; Norman Nesbitt
- Music by: Bill Lava; Carl Stalling; Milt Franklyn
- Distributed by: Warner Home Video
- Release date: November 14, 2006
- Running time: 414 minutes
- Country: United States
- Language: English

Looney Tunes Golden Collection: Volume 4 is a DVD box set that was released by Warner Home Video on November 14, 2006. The fourth release of the Looney Tunes Golden Collection DVD series, it contains 60 Looney Tunes and Merrie Melodies theatrical short subject cartoons, eight documentaries, 20 commentary tracks from animators and historians, 18 "vintage treasures from the vault", and 14 music-only or music-and-sound-effects audio tracks.

This is the first one where every disc in the collection has a special theme. Disc one is dedicated to Bugs Bunny. Disc two is devoted to cartoons directed by Frank Tashlin. Disc three is dedicated to Speedy Gonzales. Disc four features Sylvester, plus lesser known feline characters such as Conrad the Cat and Claude Cat, among others. Previous Golden Collections included at least one All-Stars disc with no common theme.

Like Volume 3, Volume 4 contains a warning about the politically incorrect humor and racial stereotypes in some of the cartoons, but unlike Volume 3's warning, which was a filmed introduction done by Whoopi Goldberg, Volume 4 simply presents a title card before the main menu with the following:

The cartoons you are about to see are products of their time. They may depict some of the ethnic and racial prejudices that were commonplace in American society. These depictions were wrong then and are wrong today. While the following does not represent the Warner Bros. view of today's society, these cartoons are being presented as they were originally created, because to do otherwise would be the same as claiming these prejudices never existed.

The Region 2 version contains only 53 shorts; 11 on Disc 2, and 14 on each of the others.

== Related releases ==
As with the first three volumes, the individual discs were released separately in Region 2:

- Disc 1: Best of Bugs Bunny, Volume 4
- Disc 2: Best of Porky & Pals, Volume 3
- Disc 3: Best of Speedy Gonzales, Volume 1
- Disc 4: All Stars, Volume 5

In Australia (Region 4), the stand-alone Best of Bugs Bunny, Volume 4 was released in 2008. It was the only disc to be released in that territory.

In Region 1, discs 1 and 4 were also released separately as the more family-friendly Looney Tunes Spotlight Collection: Volume 4.

== Disc 1 - Bugs Bunny Favorites ==
All cartoons on this disc star Bugs Bunny.

| # | Title | Co-stars | Year | Director | Series |
|---|---|---|---|---|---|
| 1 | Roman Legion-Hare | Sam | 1955 | Friz Freleng | LT |
| 2 | The Grey Hounded Hare | N/A | 1949 | Robert McKimson | LT |
| 3 | Rabbit Hood | N/A | 1949 | Chuck Jones | MM |
| 4 | Operation: Rabbit | Wile E. | 1952 | Chuck Jones | LT |
| 5 | Knight-mare Hare | N/A | 1955 | Chuck Jones | MM |
| 6 | Southern Fried Rabbit (Note: Not included in the region 2 release.) | Sam | 1953 | Friz Freleng | LT |
| 7 | Mississippi Hare | Colonel Shuffle | 1949 | Chuck Jones | LT |
| 8 | Hurdy-Gurdy Hare | N/A | 1950 | Robert McKimson | MM |
| 9 | Forward March Hare | N/A | 1953 | Chuck Jones | LT |
| 10 | Sahara Hare | Daffy, Sam | 1955 | Friz Freleng | LT |
| 11 | Barbary Coast Bunny | Nasty Canasta | 1956 | Chuck Jones | LT |
| 12 | To Hare Is Human | Wile E. | 1956 | Chuck Jones | MM |
| 13 | 8 Ball Bunny | Playboy | 1950 | Chuck Jones | LT |
| 14 | Knighty Knight Bugs | Sam | 1958 | Friz Freleng | LT |
| 15 | Rabbit Romeo | Elmer | 1957 | Robert McKimson | MM |

=== Special features ===
==== Audio bonuses ====
- Audio commentaries
  - Eric Goldberg on Rabbit Hood and Mississippi Hare
  - Paul Dini on Operation: Rabbit and Hurdy-Gurdy Hare
  - Jerry Beck on 8 Ball Bunny
  - June Foray and Jerry Beck on Rabbit Romeo
- Music only tracks on Knight-mare Hare, Sahara Hare, Barbary Coast Bunny, To Hare Is Human and Rabbit Romeo
- Music and effects track on Operation: Rabbit and Southern Fried Rabbit

==== Behind the Tunes ====
- Twilight in Tunes: The Music of Raymond Scott: A look on Raymond Scott's most famous instrumental piece that was used in the Looney Tunes and Merrie Melodies shorts Powerhouse (instrumental)
- Powerhouse in Pictures

==== From the Vault ====
- Bugs Bunny: Superstar, Part 1 (1975):
  - What's Cookin' Doc? (1944)
  - The Wild Hare (1940)
  - A Corny Concerto (1943)
  - I Taw a Putty Tat (1948)
- Fifty Years of Bugs Bunny in 3 ½ Minutes (1989)
- The Bugs Bunny Show
  - Ballpoint Puns Bridging Sequences
  - Foreign Legion Leghorn recording sessions
- Trailer Gallery:
  - Bugs Bunny's Cartoon Carnival
  - Bugs Bunny's All-Star Revue

== Disc 2 - A Dash of Tashlin ==
All cartoons on this disc are directed by Frank Tashlin.

| # | Title | Characters | Year | Series |
|---|---|---|---|---|
| 1 | The Case of the Stuttering Pig | Porky, Petunia | 1937 | LT |
| 2 | Little Pancho Vanilla | N/A | 1938 | MM |
| 3 | Little Beau Porky | Porky | 1936 | LT |
| 4 | Now That Summer Is Gone | N/A | 1938 | MM |
| 5 | Porky in the North Woods | Porky | 1936 | LT |
| 6 | You're an Education | N/A | 1938 | MM |
| 7 | Porky's Railroad | Porky | 1937 | LT |
| 8 | Plane Daffy | Daffy | 1944 | LT |
| 9 | Porky the Fireman | Porky | 1938 | LT |
| 10 | Cracked Ice | N/A | 1938 | MM |
| 11 | Puss n' Booty | N/A | 1943 | LT |
| 12 | I Got Plenty of Mutton | N/A | 1944 | LT |
| 13 | Booby Hatched | N/A | 1944 | LT |
| 14 | Porky's Poultry Plant | Porky | 1936 | LT |
| 15 | The Stupid Cupid | Daffy, Elmer | 1944 | LT |

=== Special features ===
==== Audio commentaries ====
- Mark Kausler on The Case of the Stuttering Pig and Porky in the North Woods
- Michael Barrier with Frank Tashlin on Now That Summer is Gone, Cracked Ice and Porky's Poultry Plant
- Daniel Goldmark on You're an Education
- Greg Ford on Plane Daffy and I Got Plenty of Mutton
- Jerry Beck on Puss n' Booty
- Eddie Fitzgerald on The Stupid Cupid

==== From the Vault ====
- Bugs Bunny: Superstar, part 2, which contains the following shorts:
  - Rhapsody Rabbit (1946)
  - Walky Talky Hawky (1946)
  - My Favorite Duck (1942)
  - Hair-Raising Hare (1946)
  - The Old Grey Hare (1944)
- Porky and Daffy in The William Tell Overture (1991)
- Frank Tashlin Storybooks
  - Little Chic’s Wonderful Mother
  - Tony and Clarence
- Private Snafu shorts
  - The Goldbrick (1943)
  - The Home Front (1943)
  - Censored (1944)

== Disc 3 - Speedy Gonzales in a Flash ==
All cartoons on this disc star Speedy Gonzales.

| # | Title | Co-stars | Year | Director | Series |
|---|---|---|---|---|---|
| 1 | Cat-Tails for Two | N/A | 1953 | Robert McKimson | MM |
| 2 | Tabasco Road | N/A | 1957 | Robert McKimson | LT |
| 3 | Tortilla Flaps | N/A | 1958 | Robert McKimson | LT |
| 4 | Mexicali Shmoes | N/A | 1959 | Friz Freleng | LT |
| 5 | Here Today, Gone Tamale | Sylvester | 1959 | Friz Freleng | LT |
| 6 | West of the Pesos | Sylvester | 1960 | Robert McKimson | MM |
| 7 | Cannery Woe | Sylvester | 1961 | Robert McKimson | LT |
| 8 | The Pied Piper of Guadalupe | Sylvester | 1961 | Friz Freleng, Hawley Pratt | LT |
| 9 | Mexican Boarders | Slowpoke, Sylvester | 1962 | Friz Freleng, Hawley Pratt | LT |
| 10 | Chili Weather | Sylvester | 1963 | Friz Freleng | MM |
| 11 | A Message to Gracias | Sylvester | 1964 | Robert McKimson | LT |
| 12 | Nuts and Volts | Sylvester | 1964 | Friz Freleng | LT |
| 13 | Pancho's Hideaway | Pancho Vanilla | 1964 | Friz Freleng, Hawley Pratt | LT |
| 14 | The Wild Chase | Sylvester, Wile E. Coyote and the Road Runner | 1965 | Friz Freleng, Hawley Pratt | MM |
| 15 | A-Haunting We Will Go | Daffy, Witch Hazel | 1966 | Robert McKimson | LT |

=== Special features ===
==== Audio bonuses ====
- Audio commentaries
  - Stan Freberg and Jerry Beck on Cat-Tails for Two
  - Greg Ford with Friz Freleng on Mexican Boarders
  - Art Leonardi and Jerry Beck on Nuts and Volts
  - Paul Dini on The Wild Chase
- Music only track on Tabasco Road, Mexicali Schmoes, and West of the Pesos
- Music and effects track on Cat-Tails for Two

==== From the Vault ====
- 90 Day Wondering (1956 Army reenlistment film by Chuck Jones)
- Drafty, Isn’t It? (1957 Army recruitment film by Chuck Jones)

==== Others ====
- Friz on Film (new 1-hour documentary)

== Disc 4 - Kitty Korner ==
| # | Title | Characters | Year | Director | Series |
|---|---|---|---|---|---|
| 1 | The Night Watchman | N/A | 1938 | Chuck Jones | MM |
| 2 | Conrad the Sailor | Conrad, Daffy | 1942 | Chuck Jones | MM |
| 3 | The Sour Puss | Porky | 1940 | Bob Clampett | LT |
| 4 | The Aristo-Cat | Claude, Hubie and Bertie | 1943 | Chuck Jones | MM |
| 5 | Dough Ray Me-ow | N/A | 1948 | Arthur Davis | MM |
| 6 | Pizzicato Pussycat | N/A | 1955 | Friz Freleng | MM |
| 7 | Kiss Me Cat | Marc and Pussyfoot | 1953 | Chuck Jones | LT |
| 8 | Cat Feud | Marc and Pussyfoot | 1958 | Chuck Jones | MM |
| 9 | The Unexpected Pest | Sylvester | 1956 | Robert McKimson | MM |
| 10 | Go Fly a Kit | N/A | 1957 | Chuck Jones | LT |
| 11 | Kiddin' the Kitten | Dodsworth | 1952 | Robert McKimson | MM |
| 12 | A Peck o' Trouble | Dodsworth | 1953 | Robert McKimson | LT |
| 13 | Mouse and Garden | Sylvester | 1960 | Friz Freleng | LT |
| 14 | Porky's Poor Fish | Porky | 1940 | Bob Clampett | LT |
| 15 | Swallow the Leader | Supreme Cat | 1949 | Robert McKimson | LT |

=== Special features ===
==== Audio bonuses ====
- Audio commentaries
  - Greg Ford with Chuck Jones on Conrad the Sailor
  - Eddie Fitzgerald on The Aristo-Cat
  - Greg Ford with Chuck Jones on The Aristo-Cat
  - Jerry Beck on Dough Ray Me-ow
  - Daniel Goldmark on Pizzicato Pussycat
  - June Foray and Jerry Beck on The Unexpected Pest
- Music only tracks on Cat Feud, The Unexpected Pest, and Go Fly a Kit
- Music and effects track on A Peck o' Trouble

==== Behind the Tunes ====
- One Hit Wonders
- Sing-a-Song of Looney Tunes
- The Art of the Gag
- Wild Lines: The Art of Voice Acting
- Looney Tunes: A Cast of Thousands

==== From the Vault ====
- Porky’s Breakdowns (1939 joke reel with Porky swearing) (unavailable on UK release)
- Sahara Hare Storyboard Reel
- Porky's Poor Fish Storyboard Reel

== See also ==
- Looney Tunes and Merrie Melodies filmography
  - Looney Tunes and Merrie Melodies filmography (1929–1939)
  - Looney Tunes and Merrie Melodies filmography (1940–1949)
  - Looney Tunes and Merrie Melodies filmography (1950–1959)
  - Looney Tunes and Merrie Melodies filmography (1960–1969)
  - Looney Tunes and Merrie Melodies filmography (1970–present)
