= Hyde and Hare =

1955 film by Friz Freleng

- Title card
- Directed by: I. Freleng
- Story by: Warren Foster
- Starring: Mel Blanc
- Music by: Carl Stalling
- Animation by: Gerry Chiniquy; Arthur Davis; Virgil Ross; Ted Bonnicksen
- Layouts by: Hawley Pratt
- Backgrounds by: Irv Wyner
- Color process: Technicolor
- Production company: Warner Bros. Cartoons
- Distributed by: Warner Bros. Pictures; The Vitaphone Corporation
- Release date: August 27, 1955
- Running time: 7 minutes
- Country: United States
- Language: English

Hyde and Hare is a 1955 Warner Bros. Looney Tunes cartoon, directed by Friz Freleng. The short was released on August 27, 1955, and stars Bugs Bunny. The short is based on Robert Louis Stevenson's 1886 novella Strange Case of Dr Jekyll and Mr Hyde. The cartoon pits Bugs against Dr. Jekyll, who continues to turn into Mr. Hyde. The title is a play on the expression "neither hide nor hair."

== Plot ==
Bugs Bunny emerges from his rabbit hole in a city park each morning to receive a carrot from a kind gentleman, amusingly remarking on the routine as his "timid little rabbit" act, acknowledging it as part of his livelihood. Gradually, Bugs expresses a desire to become the gentleman's pet, finding it more convenient for both of them. As they head to the gentleman's home, Bugs refers to him as "Doc".

Inside the house, Bugs goes exploring and finds a room labeled "laboratory". The gentleman, revealed to be Dr. Jekyll, drinks a potion and turns into Mr. Hyde. Mistaking Hyde for a sick person, Bugs attempts to assist but quickly realizes the danger when Hyde wields an axe. Fleeing for safety, Bugs seeks help from Dr. Jekyll.

The cycle of transformation between Jekyll and Hyde leads to chaotic encounters, with Bugs attempting to shelter Jekyll from his alter ego. Jekyll's efforts to contain Hyde's aggression prove futile. Bugs finally decides he's had enough and is about to leave, but Jekyll attempts to convince him that he'll never be bothered by Hyde again if he stays and promises to get rid of the potion, only to discover that it's already gone. When Jekyll asks Bugs if he drank it, Bugs feels insulted and immediately ends his friendship with Jekyll before returning to his park. While arriving back at the park, Bugs transforms into a monstrous rabbit without realizing it, and terrifies the onlookers. Bugs then questions the cause of the commotion around him, chewing on his carrot.

== See also ==
- Looney Tunes and Merrie Melodies filmography (1950–1959)
- List of Bugs Bunny cartoons

Preceded by This is a Life?	Bugs Bunny Cartoons; 1955	Succeeded by Knight-mare Hare
