= Happy Go Lucky =

Happy Go Lucky may refer to:

== Film and television ==
- Happy Go Lucky (1936 film), an American film
- Happy Go Lucky (1943 film), an American musical film starring Betty Hutton
- Happy Go Lucky (1946 film), a French film
- Happy Go Lucky (1972 film), a Soviet film
- Happy Go Lucky (1987 film), a Hong Kong film
- Happy Go Lucky (2003 film), a Hong Kong film of 2003
- Happy-Go-Lucky (2008 film), a British film
- Happy Go Lucky (2014 film), an Indian Punjabi film
- Happy Go Lucky (TV series), a 1961 Australian television series
- Happy Go Lucky, a 1960s British show for children featuring Jack Haig
- "Happy Go Lucky" (Veronica Mars), a television episode

== Other uses ==
- Happy-Go-Lucky (book), 2022 essay collection by David Sedaris
- Happy-Go-Lucky, Victoria, Australia, now Pearson, Victoria
- Happy Go Lucky, an album by Frankie Vaughan, or the title song, 1957
- "Happy Go Lucky", a song composed by Mel B. Kaufman
- "Happy Go Lucky", a song by Marvin Gaye from his album Romantically Yours

== See also ==
- Happy Go Licky, an American post-hardcore band
- Happy Go Lovely, a British musical film
