= Rabbit Hood =

1949 film by Chuck Jones

- Title card
- Directed by: Charles M. Jones
- Story by: Michael Maltese
- Starring: Mel Blanc; Errol Flynn (archive footage)
- Music by: Carl W. Stalling
- Animation by: Ken Harris; Phil Monroe; Ben Washam; Lloyd Vaughan
- Layouts by: Robert Gribbroek
- Backgrounds by: Peter Alvarado
- Color process: Technicolor
- Production company: Warner Bros. Cartoons
- Distributed by: Warner Bros. Pictures; The Vitaphone Corporation
- Release date: December 24, 1949 (U.S.)
- Running time: 7:55
- Language: English

Rabbit Hood is a 1949 Merrie Melodies cartoon released on December 24, 1949. The entry was directed by Chuck Jones and written by Michael Maltese, and features Bugs Bunny.

== Plot ==
Bugs Bunny finds himself entangled in the lush surroundings of the King's domain. As he attempts to silence an alarm triggered by his pilfering of carrots, he is apprehended by the Sheriff of Nottingham. Facing the grim prospect of torture, Bugs is saved by the timely arrival of Little John, who introduces him to Robin Hood, though the famed outlaw fails to materialize.

In a series of comical misdirections, Bugs outwits the Sheriff, first by fabricating the imminent arrival of the king, then by selling him the Royal Rose Garden under false pretenses. Angered by Bugs' deceptions, the Sheriff seeks revenge, only to further embarrass himself by mistaking Bugs for the king in a farcical knighting ceremony.

Despite narrowly escaping the Sheriff's wrath, Bugs finds himself in another predicament when the Sheriff's arrow grazes him while attempting to flee over the garden wall. Little John's repeated attempts to introduce the elusive Robin Hood fall flat, as the outlaw fails to show up. Bugs, skeptical of Robin's existence, mocks Little John, only to be surprised when the real Robin Hood (portrayed by Errol Flynn) makes a dramatic entrance and quotes "Welcome to Sherwood". Then Bugs quotes "Meh, that's silly. It couldn't be him."

== Production notes ==
Rabbit Hood is the last Warner Bros. cartoon released during creator Leon Schlesinger's lifetime.

Rabbit Hood is one of the few Bugs Bunny cartoons to receive a Blue Ribbon reissue. Strangely, while the shorts' technical credits remain, the Bugs Bunny in card before the title card was removed. Hot Cross Bunny, Knights Must Fall and Homeless Hare are the other three cartoons with this distinction.

Rabbit Hood is the origin of the famous "knighting" exchange, where Bugs Bunny is dressed up like a king, and proceeds to pound the Sheriff's head with his scepter while dispensing an oddball title with each strike:

Sheriff: bows
Bugs: "In the name of my most Royal Majesty, I knight thee: (strikes Sheriff over the head with his scepter) "Arise! Sir Loin of Beef."
(strike) "Arise! Earl of Cloves."
(strike) "Arise! Duke of Brittingham."
(strike) "Arise! Baron of Munchausen."
(strike) "Arise! Essence of Myrrh,"
(strike) "Milk of Magnesia,"
(strike) "Quarter of Ten...."
Sheriff: (dazed, slurred, but still on his feet) "You are too kind, your majesty."
Bugs: (to audience) "Got lots of stamina!"

The cartoon ends with the appearance of "the real" Robin Hood in the form of an archive clip from the classic 1938 movie starring Errol Flynn as it shows him swinging onto a rock and quoting "Welcome to Sherwood". He received a personal copy of this film in exchange for the right to use his earlier image.

Rule, Britannia! (1740) is used here as a satirical motif to mock English pretension.

The film's music takes advantage of the similarities between the fanfare of the Middle Ages and the reveille. The oafish Little John uses a tiny trumpet to sound a standard reveille tune. Later, Bugs disguised as a page plays another reveille melody, First Call, often used at the start of horse races, where it is also known as "Call to the Post". The sound and effect is similar to the tune used in A Knight for a Day (1946).

Rabbit Hood is also included with Robin Hood Daffy in the "Special Features" of the 2003 two-DVD Special Edition release of The Adventures of Robin Hood. Both are also included on the Blu-ray disc release of the film. It is also one of three Bugs Bunny shorts included as special features on the 2014 DVD release of Rankin/Bass Productions' animated version of The Hobbit (along with Knight-mare Hare and Knighty Knight Bugs), made possible by Warner Bros.' acquisition of much of the Rankin-Bass home video library.

The phrase "Sir Loin of Beef" is used again to name one of King Arthur's knights in Knighty Knight Bugs, co-starring Yosemite Sam.

The reference to Duke of Brittingham was an in-joke. According to former Warner's writer Lloyd Turner in an interview, Brittingham's was a bar across the street from the Warner Animation offices.

== See also ==
- Bugs Bunny filmography
- Looney Tunes and Merrie Melodies filmography (1940–1949)
- Robin Hood Daffy (1958)
- Wagon Heels (1945)
- List of films and television series featuring Robin Hood

== Sources ==
- Dunne, Michael (2001), "Intertextual Animation: The Classic Warner Brothers Cartoons and Rocky and Bullwinkle", Intertextual Encounters in American Fiction, Film, and Popular Culture, Popular Press, ISBN 978-0879728489
- Haines, John (2013), "The Making of the Middle Ages", Music in Films on the Middle Ages: Authenticity Vs. Fantasy, Routledge, ISBN 978-1135927691
- Haines, John (2013), "Music in Films of the Middle Ages", Music in Films on the Middle Ages: Authenticity Vs. Fantasy, Routledge, ISBN 978-1135927691

| Preceded by Which Is Witch | Bugs Bunny Cartoons; 1949 | Succeeded by Hurdy-Gurdy Hare |
