= Plane Daffy =

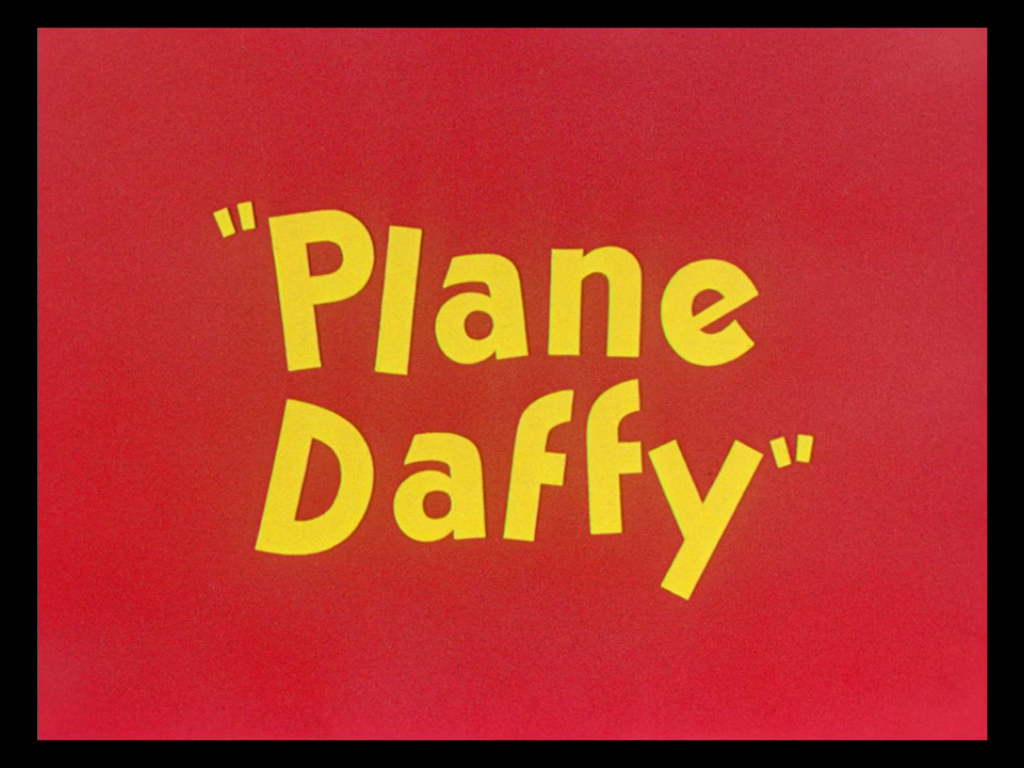
- Title card
- Directed by: Frank Tashlin
- Story by: Warren Foster
- Starring: Mel Blanc; Sara Berner; Robert C. Bruce
- Music by: Carl W. Stalling
- Animation by: Cal Dalton
- Color process: Technicolor
- Production company: Warner Bros. Cartoons
- Distributed by: Warner Bros. Pictures
- Release date: September 16, 1944
- Running time: 7:18
- Language: English

Plane Daffy is a 1944 Warner Bros. Looney Tunes cartoon directed by Frank Tashlin. The cartoon was released on September 16, 1944, and stars Daffy Duck.

The cartoon is a World War II propaganda short that depicts Daffy as a messenger battling a female Nazi spy and eventually being confronted with Adolf Hitler, Joseph Goebbels and Hermann Göring. This is the first Looney Tunes short in which Leon Schlesinger did not participate.

== Plot ==
One by one, a company of carrier pigeons falls prey to the seductive charms of the Nazi "Queen of the Spies", Hatta Mari, with the latest, Pigeon 13, succumbing to her allure after being slipped a mickey and revealing military secrets. Daffy Duck, a self-proclaimed misogynist, volunteers for the next mission and faces Hatta's attempts at seduction.

Despite being electrocuted by her kisses, Daffy resists and is chased by her around the house, leading to him ultimately swallowing his secret message when she finally corners him. Hatta Mari uses an X-ray machine and broadcasts the message to Hitler and the other leaders of the Axis, only to find it trivial (the message reading "Hitler is a stinker"). Outraged, Hitler declares "Dat ist no military secret!" Goebbels and Göring concur — "Ja. Everybody knows dat!" — then shoot themselves in the heads after receiving Hitler's angry glare. Daffy Duck then concludes the cartoon by saying "They lose more darn 'Nutzis' that way!"

== Voice cast ==
- Mel Blanc as Daffy Duck / Homer Pigeon / Adolf Hitler / Hermann Göring / Joseph Goebbels
- Sara Berner as Hatta Mari
- Robert C. Bruce as The Narrator / Captian Pigeon

== Reception ==
Animation historian Martin Goodman writes, "What sets this short apart is the burgeoning sense that Tashlin was beginning to incorporate cinematic structure and technique to his animated cartoons. The short opens with grim narration superimposed over a down shot of stoic military carrier pigeons poring over a map; the lighting effects are dramatic, and clouds of cigarette smoke rise steadily above the birds. Later in the film, Daffy opens a sequence of doors trying to escape Hatta Mari. She is behind every door, holding an increasingly large weapon, and each time the perspective is different as Tashlin experiments with camera angles... The combination of imaginative approach, aggressive sexuality, and wartime élan make Plane Daffy one of Warner's best wartime efforts."

== Notes ==
- According to DVD commentary on the Looney Tunes Golden Collection: Volume 4, Hatta Mari’s blond hair and cartoonishly top-heavy body figure would later become a reality in the 1950s with actress and sex symbol Jayne Mansfield (who, in turn, was one of many inspirations for Roger Rabbit's femme fatale Jessica Rabbit).

== Home media ==
- VHS 1986 - Viddy-Oh! For Kids Cartoon Festivals: Daffy Duck Cartoon Festival Featuring "Daffy Duck and the Dinosaur" - MGM/UA Home Video
- VHS & Laserdisc 1989 - Bugs & Daffy: The Wartime Cartoons - MGM/UA Home Video
- Laserdisc 1992 - The Golden Age of Looney Tunes: Volume 2 - MGM/UA Home Video
- DVD 2006 - Looney Tunes Golden Collection: Volume 4 (restored) - Warner Home Video
- DVD 2011 - The Essential Daffy Duck (restored) - Warner Home Video
- Blu-Ray & DVD 2014 - Looney Tunes Platinum Collection: Volume 3 (restored) - Warner Home Video

== See also ==
- List of World War II short films
- Daffy Duck filmography
- Looney Tunes and Merrie Melodies filmography (1940–1949)
