= Go Fly a Kit =

- Title card
- Directed by: Chuck Jones
- Story by: Michael Maltese
- Starring: Mel Blanc; Daws Butler
- Edited by: Treg Brown
- Music by: Milt Franklyn
- Animation by: Ken Harris; Abe Levitow; Richard Thompson; Harry Love
- Layouts by: Maurice Noble
- Backgrounds by: Philip DeGuard
- Color process: Technicolor
- Production company: Warner Bros. Cartoons
- Distributed by: Warner Bros. Pictures
- Release date: February 23, 1957
- Running time: 6:58
- Language: English

Go Fly a Kit is a 1957 Warner Bros. Looney Tunes cartoon directed by Chuck Jones released on February 23, 1957. The title is a pun on the phrase "Go fly a kite."

== Plot ==
At an airport, a businessman notices a blue-eyed red female cat anxiously waiting by a fence. The steward explains her story: she fell in love with a black-eyed black-and-white male kitten raised by an eagle, who learned to fly and saved her from a mean brown bulldog. Every winter, he flies south, and she waits for his return each spring. As the story ends, the cat's boyfriend arrives with their litter of flying kittens, bringing joy to her waiting.

== Home media ==
Go Fly a Kit was released on Looney Tunes Golden Collection: Volume 4, Disc 4.
