= Mississippi Hare =

1949 film by Chuck Jones

- Title card
- Directed by: Charles M. Jones
- Story by: Michael Maltese
- Starring: Mel Blanc (all other voices)
- Music by: Carl W. Stalling
- Animation by: Ben Washam; Lloyd Vaughan; Ken Harris; Phil Monroe; A.C. Gamer
- Layouts by: Robert Gribbroek
- Backgrounds by: Peter Alvarado
- Color process: Technicolor
- Production company: Warner Bros. Cartoons
- Distributed by: Warner Bros. Pictures
- Release date: February 26, 1949
- Running time: 7:37
- Language: English

Mississippi Hare is a 1949 Looney Tunes cartoon short directed by Chuck Jones and written by Michael Maltese. The short was released on February 26, 1949, and features Bugs Bunny.

== Plot ==
Bugs Bunny, discovered slumbering amidst a cotton plantation, inadvertently embarks on a journey down the Mississippi River after being mistaken for cotton and bundled onto a riverboat. Assuming the guise of a distinguished gentleman to evade scrutiny, Bugs encounters Colonel Shuffle, a volatile riverboat gambler resembling Yosemite Sam. Engaging in a high-stakes poker game, Bugs outwits Shuffle, who subsequently challenges him to a duel. Through a series of comedic misadventures, including a flirtatious dance and a failed attempt at retribution, Shuffle is repeatedly thwarted by Bugs. Despite momentarily assuming a Southern belle persona to evade Shuffle's advances, Bugs ultimately emerges unscathed, jesting at the comedic potential of a romantic denouement.

== Home media ==
Mississippi Hare is available on the Looney Tunes Golden Collection: Volume 4 Disc 1, and on the Looney Tunes Collector's Vault: Volume 3 Disc 2.

== See also ==
- Bugs Bunny filmography
- Looney Tunes and Merrie Melodies filmography (1940–1949)

Preceded by Hare Do	Bugs Bunny Cartoons; 1949	Succeeded by Rebel Rabbit
