= Rebel Rabbit =

1949 animated short film by Robert McKimson

- Title card
- Directed by: Robert McKimson
- Story by: Warren Foster
- Starring: Mel Blanc
- Music by: Carl Stalling
- Animation by: Charles McKimson; Phil DeLara; Manny Gould; John Carey
- Layouts by: Cornett Wood
- Backgrounds by: Richard H. Thomas
- Color process: Technicolor
- Production company: Warner Bros. Cartoons
- Distributed by: Warner Bros. Pictures; The Vitaphone Corporation
- Release date: April 9, 1949
- Running time: 6 minutes 39 seconds
- Country: United States
- Language: English

Rebel Rabbit is a 1949 Warner Bros. Merrie Melodies animated short directed by Robert McKimson. The cartoon was released on April 9, 1949, and features Bugs Bunny.

In the film, Bugs finds the insignificant bounty on rabbits to be offensive. He is informed that rabbits are considered harmless. He sets out to prove how dangerous rabbits can be, by vandalizing monuments and landmarks throughout the United States. He is soon targeted by the entire War Department. He starts serving a prison sentence in Alcatraz Island, while trying to figure out whether he overdid it.

== Plot ==
Bugs notices high bounties on various animals: $50 on foxes, $75 on bears, but then he becomes offended by the two-cent bounty on rabbits. Bugs has himself mailed to Washington, D.C., where a supercilious game commissioner explains that the bounty is so low because, while foxes and bears are "obnoxious" animals who damage property, "rabbits are perfectly harmless." Bugs vows to prove that "A rabbit can be more obnoxious than anybody!" and after squirting the official's face with an ink pen, storms out, slamming the game commissioner's door so hard that the glass shatters.

Bugs begins his campaign of direct action by attacking a guard on the leg with his own billy club. From there, he pulls stunts like renaming Barney Baruch's private bench to "Bugs Bunny" bench, painting barbershop pole stripes on the Washington Monument, and rewiring the lights in Times Square to read "BUGS BUNNY WUZ HERE".

Various newspapers comment about Bugs' actions as he goes to Buffalo, New York and shuts down Niagara Falls (revealing a faucet above and some barrels beneath it). Bugs then sells the entire island of Manhattan back to the Native Americans and is shown walking through it wearing a stereotypical feathered headdress and smoking a peace pipe, asiding to the audience "Ehh, they wouldn't take it until I threw in a set of dishes". Afterwards, Bugs saws Florida off from the rest of the country and quotes "South America, take it away!" Bugs then wonders what other kind of devilry he can commit. Bugs heads to Panama and swipes all the locks off the Panama Canal, which are represented as actual locks as he yells "I got 'em! I got 'em! I got 'em!". Bugs then heads to Arizona where he fills up the Grand Canyon. He then concludes his campaign by literally tying up railroad tracks.

An outraged bombastic Southern Senator Claghorn–esque Congressman speaks before the United States Congress and demands that they take action against Bugs, but is interrupted by Bugs who emerges from the congressman's hat, slaps him and gives him a mocking kiss. The cartoon then shows live-action footage of the entire War Department mobilizing against him. Tanks come rumbling out of their garages, soldiers pour out of barracks, the US Horse Cavalry, tanks and jet planes charge toward Bugs and bugles blow as the news of this is shown.

Bugs, now satisfied with the $1 million bounty on his head (although the bounty is for him specifically, not rabbits in general), has his Tarzan yell interrupted by the whole US Army coming after him, much to his horror. Bugs then dives into a fox hole as artillery shells surround the foxhole. Bugs then says, "Ehh, could it be that I carried this thing too far?" just as the shells explode. It then cuts to Alcatraz Island where Bugs, in his jail cell, finally remarks "Ehhh, could be...!"

== Home media ==
The uncut short is available on the Looney Tunes Golden Collection: Volume 3 DVD set.

== See also ==
- Bugs Bunny filmography
- Looney Tunes and Merrie Melodies filmography (1940–1949)
- "Florida Man", an internet meme often referencing the sequence of Bugs literally removing Florida as a joking solution to its insanity.

Preceded by Mississippi Hare	Bugs Bunny Cartoons; 1949	Succeeded by High Diving Hare
