= Here Today, Gone Tamale =

- Directed by: Friz Freleng
- Story by: Michael Maltese
- Starring: Mel Blanc; Tom Holland (uncredited)
- Edited by: Treg Brown
- Music by: Milt Franklyn
- Animation by: Gerry Chiniquy; Art Davis; Virgil Ross
- Layouts by: Hawley Pratt
- Backgrounds by: Tom O'Loughlin
- Color process: Technicolor
- Production company: Warner Bros. Cartoons
- Distributed by: Warner Bros. Pictures
- Release date: August 29, 1959
- Running time: 6 minutes
- Country: United States
- Language: English

Here Today, Gone Tamale is a Warner Bros. Looney Tunes animated short directed by Friz Freleng, released on August 29, 1959, and stars Speedy Gonzales and Sylvester. The title is a play on the phrase "here today, gone tomorrow".

== Plot ==
At a Mexican shipping port all the mice are starving to death. Suddenly a ship arrives from Switzerland with a cargo filled with cheese docks. They smell the cheese and race toward the ship, only to be chased away by Sylvester, who has been hired to guard all the cheese.

The mice suggest that the only mouse to get by Sylvester is Speedy Gonzales. He is called to help get the cheese to the mice. Sylvester challenges Speedy to get by, which he does easily. Speedy goes back and forth to deliver the cheese to the mice. All attempts to stop Speedy (from netting him to using a guillotine) fail. At one point Speedy traps Sylvester in a storage locker which has stacks of malodorous limburger.

The final shot shows the mice happy with all their food as they dance in celebration. Sylvester sees this and declares "well, if you can't beat them, join them I always say". He wears mouse ears and dances with the mice. Speedy sees this and claims that the cat has "gone loco in the cabeza". Speedy joins in the dancing as well, as the cartoon ends.

== Home media ==
Here Today, Gone Tamale is available on the Looney Tunes Golden Collection: Volume 4 Disc 3.
