= Puss n' Booty =

1943 film by Frank Tashlin

- Title card
- Directed by: Frank Tashlin
- Story by: Warren Foster
- Produced by: Leon Schlesinger
- Music by: Carl W. Stalling
- Animation by: Cal Dalton
- Color process: Black-and-white
- Production company: Leon Schlesinger Productions
- Distributed by: Warner Bros. Pictures
- Release date: December 11, 1943
- Running time: 7 min
- Country: United States
- Language: English

Puss n' Booty is a 1943 American animated comedy short film directed by Frank Tashlin. The cartoon was released on December 11, 1943. It is part of the Looney Tunes series and the final cartoon in the series produced in black-and-white; the series would have no distinction from the Merrie Melodies series from then on until their retirement.

== Plot ==
A video of the short.

A pet owner comes home to find that her pet canary Dicky is gone. As she searches around, her cat Rudolph burps the feathers of Dicky, but also stages that Dicky flew out the window. Stating that's the fifth canary that flew out on her, she calls the pet shop to get her a new bird. As the delivery truck arrives, Rudolph waits outside in hopes to get another meal. He peeps inside of the cage, revealing a small bird who shivers on sight of the cat, fearing impending doom from being eaten.

The owner names the bird Petey, and gives him and Rudolph their food. However, Rudolph is disgusted with drinking milk and attempts to eat Petey. As Rudolph leaps for the bird, Petey lifts his cage quickly, directing Rudolph into a wall. Rudolph attaches strings to the cage and attempts the same jump again, but Petey opens both doors of the cage and flies out of the way, leading Rudolph outside of the window and slamming into a fountain where a statue falls on him.

That night, Rudolph sneakily tries to nab his dinner while Petey is sleeping, but Petey smashes Rudolph's hand with a mallet and drops it on his head. Rudolph then drops from above of the cage, ricocheting up and down repeatedly until he is flung to the door. Petey quickly escapes from the cat's mouth and flies back into his cage, which has Rudolph waiting to eat him. After a large fight that wakes up the owner, the owner finds out that Rudolph is now missing. Petey tells he doesn't know where Rudolph is, and sleeps. Then he hiccups Rudolph's bow, indicating Petey killed the cat. He hides it in his feathers and goes back to sleep.

== Home media ==
Puss n' Booty is available on the Looney Tunes Golden Collection: Volume 4 Disc 2, and on the Looney Tunes Collector's Vault: Volume 3 Disc 2.
