= Rabbit Romeo =

- Title card
- Directed by: Robert McKimson
- Story by: Michael Maltese
- Starring: Mel Blanc; Arthur Q. Bryan (uncredited); June Foray (uncredited)
- Edited by: Treg Brown
- Music by: Milt Franklyn
- Animation by: Ted Bonnicksen; George Grandpre
- Layouts by: Robert Gribbroek
- Backgrounds by: William Butler
- Color process: Technicolor
- Production company: Warner Bros. Cartoons
- Distributed by: Warner Bros. Pictures
- Release date: December 14, 1957
- Running time: 6:54
- Language: English

Rabbit Romeo is a 1957 Warner Bros. Merrie Melodies cartoon directed by Robert McKimson. The short was released on December 14, 1957, and stars Bugs Bunny and Elmer Fudd. The film is one of the few pairings of Bugs and Elmer in which Bugs is not hunted throughout the entire picture (despite Elmer brandishing his hunting rifle every time Bugs tries to escape), and also notable as a cartoon in which Bugs has a romantic encounter.

== Plot ==
Elmer receives a large package, accompanied by a letter from his Uncle Judd. In the letter, Elmer is asked to take care of the enclosed rare Slobbovian rabbit (named Millicent) until he arrives, and is promised $500 for his efforts (equivalent to $5,421.75 in 2023). When he opens the box he discovers that Millicent is a huge, unattractive, female rabbit with an Eastern European/Slavic accent. When Elmer shows Millicent her room, she trashes the room and cries uncontrollably on a couch.

Elmer calls a doctor who says that Slobovian rabbits get lonely and need another rabbit to talk to. He goes out to lure a rabbit with a carrot, and catches a freezing Bugs.

When Elmer introduces Bugs to Millicent, her demeanor quickly switches from melancholic to amorous; she asks for a "laaarge keess." Most of the rest of the plot deals with Bugs' humorous attempts to evade Millicent's romantic advances; Bugs is often thwarted by a gun-wielding Elmer. After Millicent insists that she and Bugs get married, Bugs declares that they should elope. Bugs takes a rolled up sheet and holds it out the window for Milly to slide down, but lets go of the sheet as she is doing so ("Butterfingers!").

As Millicent pounds on the door, Bugs tells Elmer that Uncle Judd is at the door. Bugs offers a "bathrobe" for Elmer to slip into; as he steps into the hall, the "bathrobe" is revealed to be a bunny costume. When Elmer opens the door, Millicent becomes enchanted by Elmer (thinking he's a rabbit), and chases after him off into the countryside. The cartoon concludes with Bugs at the door, (in a cupid costume) saying: "Eh, ain't I the little matchmaker though?"

== Home media ==
Rabbit Romeo is available on the Looney Tunes Golden Collection: Volume 4 Disc 1.

| Preceded by Show Biz Bugs | Bugs Bunny Cartoons; 1957 | Succeeded by Hare-Less Wolf |
