= Mexican Borders =

Mexican Borders could refer to:

- Mexican Boarders, a 1962 Looney Tunes short featuring Speedy Gonzales and Slowpoke Rodriguez
- Borders of Mexico, international borders Mexico shares with three nations
