= Hurdy-Gurdy Hare =

1950 film by Robert McKimson

- Title card
- Directed by: Robert McKimson
- Story by: Warren Foster
- Starring: Mel Blanc
- Music by: Carl Stalling
- Animation by: J.C. Melendez; Emery Hawkins; Charles McKimson; John Carey; Phil DeLara
- Layouts by: Cornett Wood
- Backgrounds by: Philip DeGuard
- Color process: Technicolor
- Production company: Warner Bros. Cartoons
- Distributed by: Warner Bros. Pictures; The Vitaphone Corporation
- Release date: January 21, 1950
- Running time: 6:57
- Language: English

Hurdy-Gurdy Hare is a 1950 Warner Bros. Merrie Melodies cartoon short directed by Robert McKimson. The short was released on January 21, 1950, and stars Bugs Bunny.

In the film, Bugs works as a street musician with a trained monkey. He fires the monkey for stealing from him, then the monkey convinces a gorilla to confront Bugs for his behavior.

== Plot ==
In Central Park, Bugs Bunny's foray into the world of street performance leads to a series of comedic misadventures. Initially enticed by the prospects of earning through a street organ, Bugs' ambition is fueled by the monetary success of his monkey assistant. At first things go well until Bugs discovers that the monkey tried to steal his share of the profits by hiding it in his hat, Bugs dismisses the monkey and attempts the job himself, only to encounter a lack of financial reward.

The plot takes an unexpected turn when the disgruntled monkey seeks solace in the company of a gorilla at the zoo, embellishing his encounter with Bugs. Incited by the monkey's tale of mistreatment, the enraged gorilla breaks free and confronts Bugs. Employing his trademark wit and resourcefulness, Bugs orchestrates a series of comical exchanges to outmaneuver the formidable gorilla, ultimately resorting to trapping him within a makeshift brick wall. However, the resilient gorilla breaks free, leading to a climactic showdown where Bugs, faced with imminent danger, resorts to the universal language of music to pacify the savage beast. Utilizing the power of his violin performance, Bugs not only quells the gorilla's aggression but also inspires him to dance joyfully.

In a triumphant twist, Bugs capitalizes on the gorilla's newfound appreciation for music, orchestrating a lucrative scheme where the gorilla, accompanied by the monkey and the street organ, visits apartments, showering Bugs with a windfall of cash.

== Home media ==
Hurdy-Gurdy Hare is available on the Looney Tunes Golden Collection: Volume 4 Disc 1.

== See also ==
- List of Bugs Bunny cartoons

Preceded by Rabbit Hood	Bugs Bunny Cartoons; 1949	Succeeded by Mutiny On The Bunny
