= Porky's Poultry Plant =

1936 film by Frank Tash

- Title card
- Directed by: Frank Tash
- Produced by: Leon Schlesinger
- Starring: Joe Dougherty; Tedd Pierce; Dorothy Lloyd; Dorothy Hill
- Music by: Carl W. Stalling
- Animation by: Don Williams; Volney White
- Color process: Black-and-white
- Production company: Leon Schlesinger Productions
- Distributed by: Warner Bros. Productions; The Vitaphone Corporation
- Release date: August 22, 1936
- Running time: 8 mins
- Country: United States
- Language: English

Porky's Poultry Plant is a 1936 American animated comedy short film directed by Frank Tash. The short was released on August 22, 1936. It is the 74th film in the Looney Tunes series, the twelfth cartoon to feature Porky Pig, the first film in the series to be directed by Francis von Taschlein, who had worked as an animator for the studio in 1934 and replaced Jack King, and the first to be composed by Carl W. Stalling after Norman Spencer's departure.

== Plot ==
Porky Pig operates an own poultry plant consisting of chickens, chicks, ducks and geese. After a rooster sings a poor attempt of "Reveille", Porky does his daily morning corn feeding. Noticing that a chick could not keep up to the pace of the other birds and starves, Porky baits the other birds with a false throw and gives the chick its feed. Three chicks try and fail to eat earthworms, so Porky plays a funnel like a trumpet to summon the earthworms and allow the chicks to eat them.

Porky mourns the loss of the chickens who were abducted and eaten by a chickenhawk He shakes his fists at the poster of the chickenhawk, vowing to get it once and for all. The chicken-hawk appears and Porky sounds the alarm, causing all the birds to hide but one chick, who is unable to escape. Porky is slammed into a tree by the recoil of his rifle.

The hen notices her missing chick and notifies Porky, who then prepares his fighter plane and chases the chickenhawk. As the chickenhawk's tail is grazed, it calls for its peers, who pull Porky out of his plane then pulls his tail as retaliation. The chickenhawks steal Porky's gun and damages his plane, then throw the chick around as if the entire ordeal is a football game. Porky swoops down just in time to save the chick, calming its mother, and incapacitates the chickenhawks with exhaust fumes. The hens dig a hole that buries the chickenhawks. Porky lands and returns the chicken to its mother, who is soon frightened by what seems to be another chickenhawk, only for Porky to realize it is his weather vane.

== Home media ==
This short was released on the Looney Tunes Golden Collection: Volume 4 DVD box set on November 14, 2006, and on the Porky Pig 101 DVD box set on September 19, 2017.

== See also ==
- Porky Pig filmography
- Looney Tunes and Merrie Melodies filmography (1930–1939)
