= Mexican Boarders =

- Title card
- Directed by: Friz Freleng; Hawley Pratt (co-director)
- Story by: John Dunn
- Starring: Mel Blanc; Tom Holland (uncredited)
- Narrated by: Tom Holland (uncredited)
- Edited by: Treg Brown
- Music by: Milt Franklyn
- Animation by: Virgil Ross; Gerry Chiniquy; Bob Matz; Art Leonardi; Lee Halpern
- Layouts by: Hawley Pratt
- Backgrounds by: Tom O'Loughlin
- Color process: Technicolor
- Production company: Warner Bros. Cartoons
- Distributed by: Warner Bros. Pictures
- Release date: May 12, 1962
- Running time: 6 minutes
- Language: English

Mexican Boarders is a 1962 Warner Bros. Looney Tunes cartoon short directed by Friz Freleng. The short was released on May 12, 1962, and stars Speedy Gonzales and Sylvester. Voice actors are Mel Blanc (doing the voices of Sylvester and Speedy), and Tom Holland as the narrator.

The title is a portmanteau of "Mexican borders" (referring to either the international border or the border wall) and boarders, as well as a punny allusion to the basic plot premise. This is the second Speedy Gonzales short to feature Slowpoke Rodriguez, who made his debut in Mexicali Shmoes (in his first appearance, he and Speedy's relationship was not revealed).

== Plot ==
Speedy Gonzales resides in the lavish hacienda of José Álvaro Meléndez in an unnamed Mexican metropolis. Meanwhile, Sylvester the Cat relentlessly pursues Speedy, earning the moniker of "the most pooped cat in all Mexico" due to his futile efforts. Despite ingesting pep pills to boost his energy, Sylvester's endeavors to capture Speedy remain unsuccessful.

The dynamic of their chase is disrupted by the arrival of Slowpoke Rodriguez, Speedy's country cousin, recognized for his laid-back demeanor and bindle stick. Mistakenly viewing Slowpoke as an easier target, Sylvester permits his entry into the hacienda, only for Speedy to swiftly rescue him. Slowpoke's subsequent attempts to procure food are likewise thwarted by Speedy, culminating in a successful cheese raid from the kitchen, albeit with Slowpoke lamenting the absence of Tabasco sauce.

Sylvester then resorts to trapping Speedy with glue, inadvertently ingesting hot sauce in the process. Despite a satisfying meal, Slowpoke yearns for dessert, prompting another raid on the pantry. Sylvester's efforts to impede their progress with wire mesh prove futile, as Speedy effortlessly overcomes the obstacle, leaving Sylvester in disarray.

Just as Speedy and Slowpoke are about to sleep, Slowpoke declares that he is still hungry and insists that he raid the pantry himself, to which Speedy objects due to Slowpoke's laid-back demeanor. After some convincing, Slowpoke goes off to the pantry and Sylvester catches on to him. However, Slowpoke's cunning intellect surpasses his leisurely pace, outwitting Sylvester and transforming him into an unwitting servant. The mice finally have their meal, with Sylvester as their servant. Slowpoke finally tells Speedy, "I like your pussycat friend. He is nice and stupid".

== Other media ==
Portions of this short were edited into the 1964 short Road to Andalay and the 1982 feature film Bugs Bunny's 3rd Movie: 1001 Rabbit Tales.

== Home media ==
The unedited cartoon was released on DVD in November 2006 on the third disc of Looney Tunes Golden Collection: Volume 4. This DVD release includes a commentary track by animator Greg Ford. The cartoon was later released on Blu-ray in March 2026 on the second disc of Looney Tunes Collector's Vault: Volume 2, also with optional commentary by Greg Ford.

== See also ==
- List of American films of 1962
