= Little Pancho Vanilla =

1938 film by Frank Tashlin

- Blue Ribbon reissue title card
- Directed by: Frank Tashlin
- Story by: Ted Pierce
- Produced by: Leon Schlesinger
- Starring: Mel Blanc; Ynez Seabury
- Music by: Carl W. Stalling
- Animation by: Robert McKimson
- Color process: Technicolor
- Production company: Leon Schlesinger Productions
- Distributed by: Warner Bros. Pictures; The Vitaphone Corporation
- Release date: October 8, 1938
- Running time: 7 min
- Country: United States
- Language: English

Little Pancho Vanilla is a 1938 American animated comedy short film directed by Frank Tashlin. The short was released on October 8, 1938. It is part of the Merrie Melodies series. It was re-released as a "Blue Ribbon" reissue in 1948, rendering the original film and credits lost.

Despite only appearing in one cartoon, Pancho was resurrected in 1952 as a backup feature in the Looney Tunes and Merrie Melodies comic book, appearing from issue #130 (Aug 1952) to #154 (Aug 1954).

== Plot ==
A Mexican boy, Pancho Vanilla, reads a book about bullfighting and dreams of being a real toreador to his mother's chagrin. He finds three girls who prefer a matador named Don Jose, a caricature of Clark Gable, over him.

Pancho arrives at the arena in an attempt to join an amateur tournament, but he is kicked out for being a child. The amateur toreadors instantly fold upon being charged at by the bull, with one being launched out of the arena and in turn accidentally launching Pancho into the arena. He knocks out the bull during the fall and is met with applause. The bull then wakes up to retaliate, but is knocked out twice by Pancho running into him and falling on him. Pancho wins enough money for his mother to buy an automatic washing machine.

== Home media ==
- Laserdisc - The Golden Age of Looney Tunes, Vol. 3, Side 6: Tashlin/Clampett
- DVD - Looney Tunes Golden Collection: Volume 4, Disc 2
