= Hare Do =

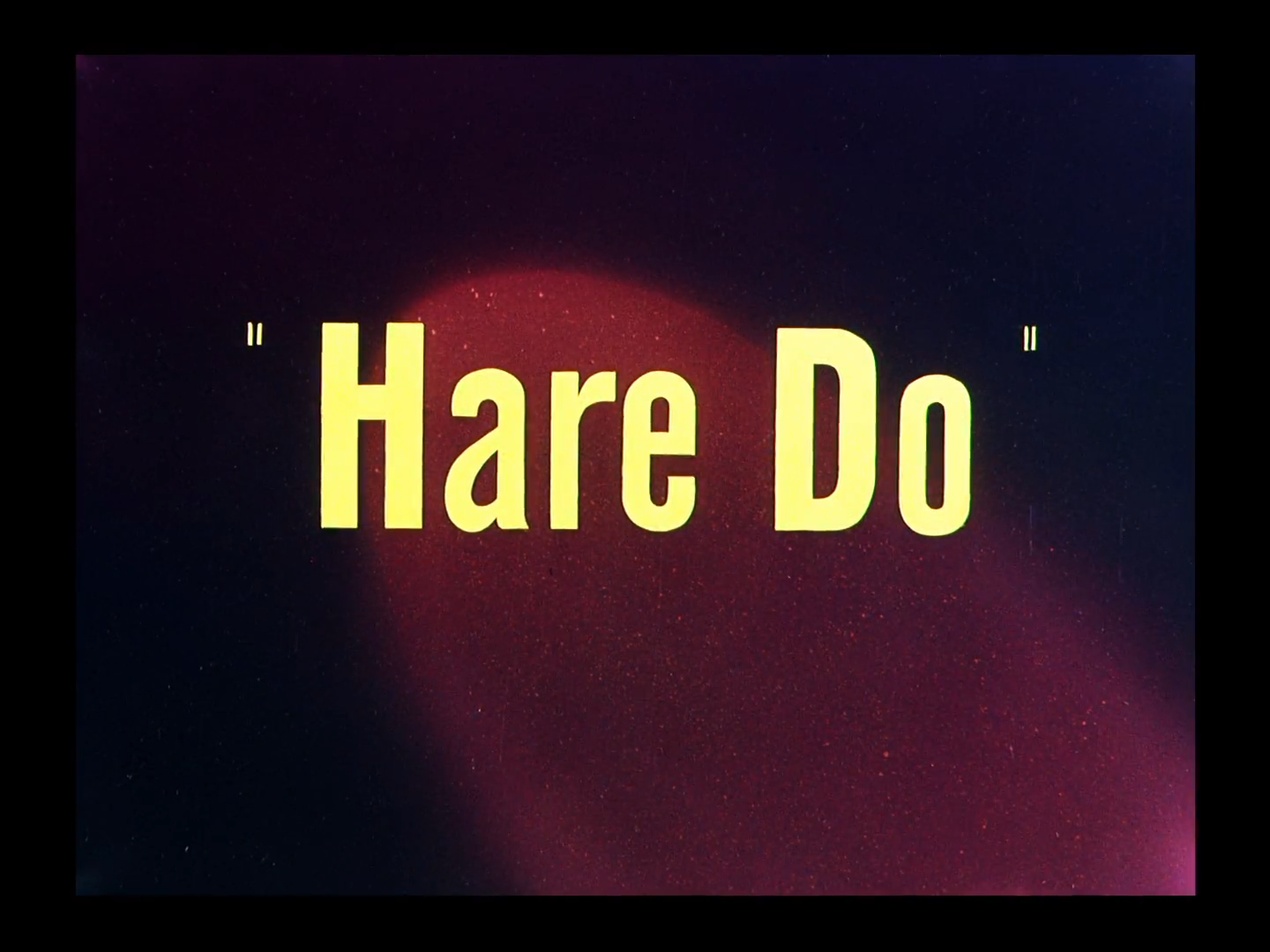
- Title card
- Directed by: I. Freleng
- Story by: Tedd Pierce
- Starring: Mel Blanc
- Music by: Carl Stalling
- Animation by: Gerry Chiniquy; Manuel Perez; Ken Champin; Virgil Ross
- Layouts by: Hawley Pratt
- Backgrounds by: Paul Julian
- Color process: Technicolor
- Production company: Warner Bros. Cartoons
- Distributed by: Warner Bros. Pictures; The Vitaphone Corporation
- Release date: January 15, 1949 (U.S.)
- Running time: 7:31
- Language: English

Hare Do is a 1949 Warner Bros. Merrie Melodies cartoon. The short was released on January 15, 1949, and stars Bugs Bunny and Elmer Fudd.

== Plot ==
Elmer Fudd is hunting for Bugs Bunny using his "Wabbit Detector". ("Awmy surpwus, hehehehehehehe," chortles Fudd.) As he is searching, Bugs misleads Elmer, who walks off a cliff. Later Elmer gives chase to Bugs and Bugs hitches a ride in a car not noticing Elmer is the driver. When Bugs realizes that, Elmer stops the car at a movie theater.

Bugs pays his admission to get in the theater. After some pushing his way through the occupied seats and getting a snack, he is faced with Elmer. As Elmer follows Bugs pushing their way past the occupied seats Elmer comes across a little old lady, who hits Elmer for his interruption. Elmer finds out that the "old lady" is Bugs in disguise ensuing a scuffle with Bugs as he calls an usher who throws Elmer out.

Back at his seat, Bugs' view is blocked by a woman with a large hat-which turns out to be Elmer. Elmer chases Bugs to a different theater and is greeted by a message on screen requesting him to come to the box office. When Elmer inquires, Bugs splatters a pie in his face. Elmer then chases Bugs into the men's lounge, but Bugs rushes back out and replaces the sign with the sign from the ladies' lounge. Bugs reports Elmer to the usher who throws Elmer out again. When Elmer attempts to get back inside, he runs into a guard, who then scares Elmer away.

When Elmer sneaks back in, he ends up getting trampled by movie patrons going in and out, due to Bugs operating the notification lights until Elmer catches up to him. Elmer then chases Bugs back to the theater, where Bugs disguises himself as an usher and leads Elmer through the dark. Bugs then reveals himself on stage in a circus act, where his partner, Elmer, on a unicycle, will ride down a highwire and into the mouth of a lion. Due to Bugs having placed dark sunglasses on him in the dark, Elmer is unaware he's the act as he unknowingly unicycles down to the waiting lion. Bugs then opens the lion's mouth, where he hears Elmer's voice, completely unaware of where he is, wondering if the stunt guy made it. Bugs casts a side glance to the audience and says "Eh, yep, he made it" and closes the lion's mouth as the camera irises out.

== Production notes ==
Hare Do is one of the few Bugs Bunny/Elmer Fudd pairings directed by Friz Freleng that was released after Hare Trigger, the debut of Yosemite Sam (most of whose appearances were in cartoons directed by Freleng).

The film being shown at the theater (the marquee is partially visible when Bugs stops the car) is 1936's Anthony Adverse.

This is also the last entry where Bugs is seen sitting on the Warner Bros. Shield and then he pulls it down during the post-1948 period. This would not occur again until (Blooper) Bunny in 1991.

The cartoon's final scene is a nod to the ending of A Day at the Zoo (1939), which featured Elmer's derby hatted squinted-eyed prototype named "Elmer" being swallowed up by a lion.

== Home media ==
Hare Do is available on the Looney Tunes Golden Collection: Volume 3 DVD set.

== See also ==
- Bugs Bunny filmography
- Elmer Fudd filmography
- Looney Tunes and Merrie Melodies filmography (1940–1949)

Preceded by My Bunny Lies Over The Sea	Bugs Bunny Cartoons; 1949	Succeeded by Mississippi Hare
