= Knight-mare Hare =

- Title card
- Directed by: Chuck Jones
- Story by: Tedd Pierce
- Starring: Mel Blanc
- Music by: Milt Franklyn
- Animation by: Ken Harris; Ben Washam; Abe Levitow; Richard Thompson
- Layouts by: Ernie Nordli
- Backgrounds by: Philip De Guard
- Color process: Technicolor
- Production company: Warner Bros. Cartoons
- Distributed by: Warner Bros. Pictures; The Vitaphone Corporation
- Release date: October 1, 1955
- Running time: 7:30
- Language: English

Knight-mare Hare is a 1955 Warner Bros. Merrie Melodies theatrical cartoon directed by Chuck Jones and written by Tedd Pierce. The short was released on October 1, 1955, and stars Bugs Bunny.

== Plot ==
Bugs Bunny is reading a book about the Knights of the Round Table while having his ears washed, when an apple falls and hits him on the head and the washing equipment; it transports him back to the time of King Arthur. When he wakes up he encounters a knight named Sir O of Kay, Earl of Watercress, who challenges him to a joust. Bugs trips the knight's horse, sending him flying into a castle tower.

Pursued by a fire-breathing dragon, Bugs defeats the creature with seltzer, causing it to cry and run away. Seeking refuge in another castle, Bugs encounters Merlin of Monroe, a supposed sorcerer. Merlin attempts to use "magic powder" to transform Bugs into a pig, but Bugs turns the tables on Merlin by transforming him into a donkey. To return to the present, Bugs tosses an apple to hit himself on the head. Successfully returning to his own time, Bugs encounters a farmer with a plow-donkey resembling Merlin's transformed state. Dismissing the resemblance, Bugs continues on, only to be surprised when the farmer addresses the donkey as "Merlin".

== Home media ==
The cartoon is available on the Looney Tunes Golden Collection: Volume 4 DVD box set.

== See also ==
- Bugs Bunny: Lost in Time, a video game loosely based on the film and other Looney Tunes shorts

Preceded by Hyde and Hare	Bugs Bunny Cartoons; 1955	Succeeded by Roman Legion-Hare
