= Chili Weather =

- Title card
- Directed by: Friz Freleng
- Story by: John Dunn
- Starring: Mel Blanc
- Edited by: Lee Gunther
- Music by: Bill Lava
- Animation by: Gerry Chiniquy; Virgil Ross; Bob Matz; Lee Halpern; Art Leonardi
- Layouts by: Hawley Pratt
- Backgrounds by: Tom O'Loughlin
- Color process: Technicolor
- Production company: Warner Bros. Cartoons
- Distributed by: Warner Bros. Pictures
- Release date: August 17, 1963
- Running time: 6:20
- Language: English

Chili Weather is a 1963 Warner Bros. Merrie Melodies cartoon directed by Friz Freleng. The short was released on August 17, 1963, and stars Speedy Gonzales and Sylvester.

== Plot ==
Mexican mice attempt to enter the Guadalajara Food Processing Plant but are thwarted by Sylvester, who is guarding it. Hungry, they summon Speedy Gonzales for help.

Speedy successfully steals cheese, but Sylvester chases him. On a conveyor belt, Sylvester gets shaved by chopping blades. Speedy then spreads grease on a platform, causing Sylvester to skid into a vat of Tabasco Sauce, from which he recovers by melting a block of ice. On another conveyor belt, Sylvester gets a bottle cap pressed onto his head. He removes it with a bottle opener, but Speedy traps it back on by causing Sylvester to hit the ceiling and hides the opener.

Sylvester, now aimlessly wandering and trying to club Speedy, accidentally enters a dehydrator. He emerges in miniature size, finally removing the bottle cap, but flees in fright when the now larger Speedy greets him.

== Crew ==
- Story: John Dunn
- Animation: Gerry Chiniquy, Virgil Ross, Bob Matz, Lee Halpern, Art Leonardi
- Layout: Hawley Pratt
- Backgrounds: Tom O'Loughlin
- Film Editor: Lee Gunther
- Voice Characterizations: Mel Blanc
- Music: Bill Lava
- Produced by: David H. DePatie
- Directed by: Friz Freleng

== Home media ==
- DVD – Looney Tunes Golden Collection: Volume 4
