= Now That Summer Is Gone =

1938 film by Frank Tashlin

- Blue Ribbon reissue title card
- Directed by: Frank Tashlin
- Story by: Fred Neiman
- Produced by: Leon Schlesinger
- Music by: Carl W. Stalling
- Animation by: Bob McKimson
- Color process: Technicolor
- Production company: Leon Schlesinger Productions
- Distributed by: Warner Bros. Productions; The Vitaphone Corporation
- Release date: May 14, 1938
- Running time: 6 min
- Country: United States
- Language: English

Now That Summer Is Gone is a 1938 American animated comedy short film directed by Frank Tashlin. The short was released on May 14, 1938. It is the 94th film in the Merrie Melodies series. It was re-released as a "Blue Ribbon" reissue in 1947, rendering the original film and credits to be lost.

== Plot ==
As the winter approaches, squirrels diligently gather nuts for survival with numerous absurd tools. A young squirrel wins a large number of nuts from other children by playing craps, but is spotted by his father. He is made to retrieve his father's savings from the bank, but spends it all on gambling with a gentleman. He pretends to have been robbed, only to be spanked as the gentleman reveals himself to be his father in disguise.

== Home media ==
- LaserDisc - The Golden Age of Looney Tunes, Volume 5, Side 4
- DVD - Looney Tunes Golden Collection: Volume 4, Disc 2
