= The Case of the Stuttering Pig =

1937 film by Frank Tashlin

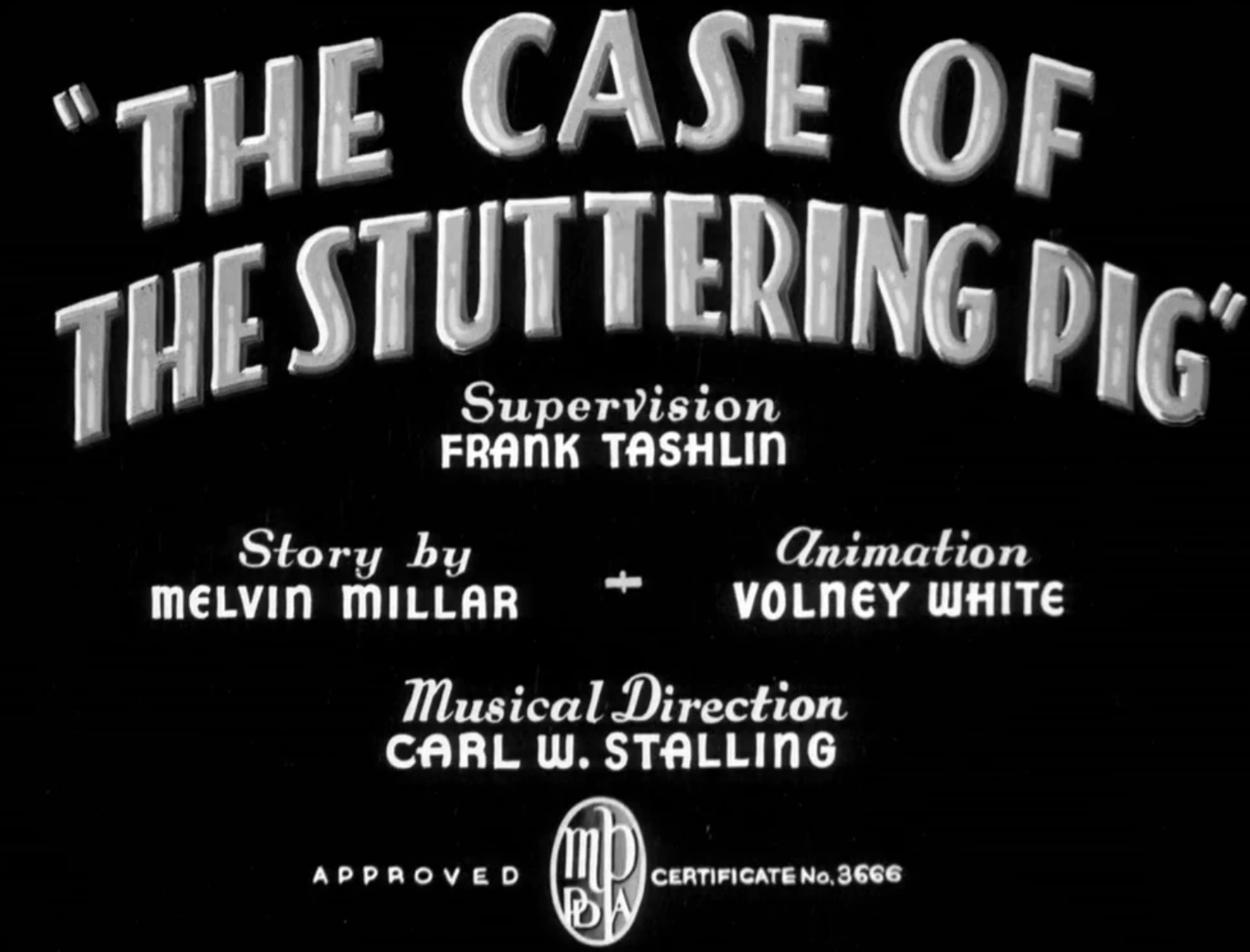
- Title card
- Directed by: Frank Tashlin
- Story by: Melvin Millar
- Produced by: Leon Schlesinger
- Starring: Mel Blanc; Billy Bletcher; Shirley Reed
- Music by: Carl W. Stalling
- Animation by: Volney White; Robert Bentley
- Color process: Black-and-white
- Production company: Leon Schlesinger Productions
- Distributed by: Warner Bros. Productions; The Vitaphone Corporation
- Release date: October 30, 1937
- Running time: 7 min
- Country: United States
- Language: English

The Case of the Stuttering Pig is a 1937 American animated comedy short film directed by Frank Tashlin. The short was released on October 30, 1937. It is the 93rd film in the Looney Tunes series, the 31st cartoon to feature Porky Pig and the second cartoon to feature Petunia Pig, who is unconventionally depicted as his sister.

== Plot ==
On a stormy night, Patrick, Percy, Portis, Peter, Petunia and Porky Pig find their seemingly benevolent lawyer Goodwill at their door. They learn of their inheritance from their late uncle Solomon, who resembles Oliver Hardy; the inheritance would otherwise go to Goodwill shall anything happen to his niece and nephews. Clearly desiring the inheritance for himself, he sneaks into the basement and drinks two cups of "Jekyll and Hyde juice", transforming him into a crooked figure in order to allow him to get away with his crimes. Breaking the fourth wall, the monster warns the audience not to intervene, especially the one in the third row.

Goodwill turns off the lights and quickly abducts Porky's older brothers, while Porky and Petunia hide behind an armchair. He gags the four pigs and lock them in place with a pillory while he seeks Porky and Petunia. The monster then snatches Petunia and pursues Porky. Porky locks himself in a room, only to find his siblings locked up, which he frees when Goodwill enters. Goodwill is immediately dispatched and sent into the pillory by the moviegoer on the third row with a cinema seat, who calls out his actions much to his chagrin.

== Home media ==
- DVD:
  - Looney Tunes Golden Collection: Volume 4 (2006)
  - Porky Pig 101 (2017)

== See also ==
- Porky Pig filmography
- Looney Tunes and Merrie Melodies filmography (1930–1939)
