= Which Is Witch =

1949 film by Friz Freleng

- Lobby card
- Directed by: I. Freleng
- Story by: Tedd Pierce
- Starring: Mel Blanc
- Music by: Carl W. Stalling
- Animation by: Arthur Davis; Gerry Chiniquy; Ken Champin; Virgil Ross; A.C. Gamer (effects animation)
- Layouts by: Hawley Pratt
- Backgrounds by: Paul Julian
- Color process: Technicolor
- Production company: Warner Bros. Cartoons
- Distributed by: Warner Bros. Pictures; The Vitaphone Corporation
- Release date: December 3, 1949 (US)
- Running time: 7 minutes
- Language: English

Which Is Witch is a Looney Tunes cartoon released by Warner Bros. Pictures in 1949, directed by Friz Freleng and written by Tedd Pierce. It was released on December 3, 1949, and features Bugs Bunny. The cartoon has been taken out of circulation in recent years due to racially insensitive depictions of Africans.

== Plot ==
In Darkest Africa, Bugs Bunny runs afoul of Dr. I.C. Spots, the diminutive witch doctor of a nearby tribe who wants to use the rabbit in a potion. Realizing he's about to be cooked, Bugs flees from the doctor, disguising himself as a native. The doctor sees through the disguise and chases Bugs to the river, where the bunny makes for a nearby ferry boat. Dr. Spots follows, but is swallowed by a crocodile. Bugs beats up the reptile and turns it into a crocodile-skin bag, with the tiny witch doctor inside dressed in crocodile shoes.

== Reception ==
The Film Daily reviewed the film on January 1, 1950: "When Dr. Ugh, Witch Doctor extraordinary for a tribe of little people, decides it's time to leave. The jungle medico learns he can't split the hare, and B.B. emerges victorious once more. Wonderful cartoon."

== See also ==
- Bugs Bunny filmography
- Looney Tunes and Merrie Melodies filmography (1940–1949)

Preceded by Frigid Hare	List of Bugs Bunny cartoons 1949	Succeeded by Rabbit Hood
