= Tortilla Flaps =

1958 film directed by Robert McKimson

- Directed by: Robert McKimson
- Story by: Tedd Pierce
- Produced by: John Burton Sr.
- Starring: Mel Blanc
- Edited by: Treg Brown
- Music by: Milt Franklyn
- Animation by: George Grandpré; Ted Bonnicksen
- Layouts by: Robert Gribbroek
- Backgrounds by: Richard H. Thomas
- Color process: Technicolor
- Production company: Warner Bros. Cartoons
- Distributed by: Warner Bros. Pictures
- Release date: January 18, 1958
- Running time: 6:47
- Country: United States
- Language: English

Tortilla Flaps is a Warner Bros. Looney Tunes cartoon directed by Robert McKimson, released on January 18, 1958. It stars Speedy Gonzales, and is one of the few shorts during the Golden Age of American Animation where he is not put at odds with a cat. The title is a play on John Steinbeck's 1935 novel Tortilla Flat.

== Summary ==
While Speedy is playing ping-pong (by himself), a hungry hawk named Señor Vulturo swoops down and tries to eat the mice.

== Plot ==
It's Cinco de Mayo, and the mice are celebrating with their own carnival similar to the human celebration with Speedy Gonzales playing ping-pong by himself as many mice look on while a couple of the mice chat about Speedy going steady with everybody's sister.

However, the celebration is interrupted as Señor Vulturo sees the carnival and decides to have a supper of mouse burgers. When his shadow is seen zooming overhead, the mice panic and flee to safety, shouting in panic things like "El Bandito Bird!" and "El Vulturo!". Speedy notices the commotion and goes to ask what's going on. As several mice point out Vulturo and fear their celebration is ruined, Speedy assures them he will fix Señor Vulturo, "but good."

However, one mouse points out Vulturo already going for his first victim, crying for help, and Speedy realizes that's his cue. Speedy is able to fly in and rescue the mouse, replacing him under his sombrero with a firecracker. When Vulturo discovers the switch, he's unable to avoid having the firecracker go off and burn his foot, forcing him to douse it in a nearby rain bucket while the mouse backs away praising Speedy with repeated thanks for saving his life as he retreats to cover. After Speedy assures the mouse it was nothing, he goes back to deal with Vulturo, spooking him into landing in the rain barrel, before asking if someone gave Vulturo the hot foot. Vulturo admits, then denies it happened, before suspecting Speedy of stealing his supper. When Speedy admits his crime, Vulturo asks him why before preparing to squash him for stealing his supper. However, Speedy dodges the slaps, even taunting Vulturo with some dancing and singing, before retreating back to his mouse hole while still singing as Vulturo gives pursuit, attempts to belly-slide to catch Speedy when he dives for him, then crashes headlong into Speedy's mouse hole, flattening his beak into a flat shape before Speedy wobbles it back into its normal appearance, then bugs out, leading to Vulturo giving pursuit once more.

When Speedy notices he's being followed, he asks Vulturo if he's following him, but Vulturo feigns ignorance, saying he would not do a thing like that, leading to Speedy accelerating and putting some distance between him and Vulturo before arriving at a railroad crossing, where when Speedy sees a train coming, he tries to warn Vulturo, but Vulturo is unable to stop in time before being clobbered by the train. Speedy comes over to check on him, and uses his tail feathers to brush him off as he reprimands him about looking both ways before crossing the tracks. Once done, Speedy returns the tail feathers, and takes his leave. Before Vulturo can resume the chase after putting his tail feathers back on, he's hit again by a sidecar, sending him crashing back to the ground to sulk in silent annoyance.

Speedy soon arrives at a rock outcropping outside town, and gets the feeling he's being watched. As it turns out, Vulturo is on another cliff with a large cannon, preparing to blast Speedy with it once he has Speedy lined up in the crosshairs, but once he does, and lights the fuse, Speedy catches on, zooms behind Vulturo, and spooks him into standing in front of the cannon so he gets blasted instead, blowing his beak off. As Vulturo snorts out an annoyed sigh, Speedy returns his beak to him. Vulturo is grateful, and Speedy suggests that since Vulturo can't and probably won't catch him, Speedy knows one, fat, juicy mouse that would be perfect for Vulturo and will show him where that mouse lives. With that, Speedy takes off, and Vulturo follows after him.

Speedy leads him back into town, but upon reaching the mouse hole, Speedy dives in while Vulturo crashes into the wall. As his head begins to split open, he quickly grabs his sombrero to cover it, then asks Speedy where the mouse he was talking about is as he climbs back to his feet. Speedy however, says that Vulturo has the wrong mouse hole as there's no one in that hole except for chickens, complete with Speedy clucking like one to fool him. Vulturo is not convinced in the slightest, but plays along, saying he'll look somewhere else, but has a plan to lure Speedy out.

Taking one of those toys with the ball attached to a string that a person tries to land in the cup to a nearby explosives shed, Vulturo drops a few light drops of volatile nitroglycerin into the cup so when the ball lands in it, the simple catch would set off the explosive. Once done, Vulturo carefully takes the toy back to Speedy's hole, plants it in front with a card, then knocks on the wall to get Speedy's attention before ducking around the corner to hide. Speedy comes out to see who's there, but soon notices Vulturo's leg and foot peeking out from around the corner, and realizes Vulturo is trying to lure him out into a trap. Not at all fooled, Speedy plays along as he goes to read the card, then decides to try the toy out, purposefully playing with it wrong to lure out Vulturo. It works. Annoyed by Speedy's stupidity, Vulturo emerges to show Speedy how it is done, but this allows Speedy to run up to the roof and catch the ball at the top of its swing, holding it taut. When Vulturo notices, he's instantly nervous at what could come next. When Speedy asks if he gives up, Vulturo refuses, and Speedy drops the ball, causing it to land in the cup and set off the nitroglycerin. When the smoke clears, Vulturo has had his feathers and sombrero blown off, and he finally throws up the white flag and surrenders.

As a result, the carnival gets back underway, and Speedy is the presenter for a ball toss game where a mouse gets three balls for 1 peso to win the Swiss cheese prize. The target: the still-featherless Señor Vulturo, who admits that while the balls don't bother him, the darts do, revealing his backside being used as a dart board for another carnival game with the same deal: 3 darts for one peso, as three darts land bulls-eyes on the target, causing him to yelp in pain from each hit.

== Voice cast ==
- Mel Blanc voices Speedy Gonzales, Señor Vulturo, Mice
- Additional voices are provided by Tom Holland (uncredited)

== Home media ==
Tortilla Flaps is available on the Looney Tunes Golden Collection: Volume 4 Disc 3.

== See also ==
- List of American films of 1958
- Tortilla Flat, a 1935 Steinbeck novel.
- Looney Tunes and Merrie Melodies filmography (1950–1959)
