= Nuts and Volts (film) =

- Title card
- Directed by: Friz Freleng
- Story by: John Dunn
- Starring: Mel Blanc
- Edited by: Treg Brown
- Music by: Bill Lava
- Animation by: Gerry Chiniquy; Virgil Ross; Bob Matz; Lee Halpern; Art Leonardi
- Layouts by: Hawley Pratt
- Backgrounds by: Tom O'Loughlin
- Color process: Technicolor
- Production company: Warner Bros. Cartoons
- Distributed by: Warner Bros. Pictures
- Release date: July 20, 1964
- Running time: 6:22
- Language: English

Nuts and Volts is a 1964 Warner Bros. Looney Tunes cartoon short directed by Friz Freleng. The short was released on July 20, 1964, and stars Speedy Gonzales and Sylvester.

== Plot ==
After getting tired of chasing Speedy Gonzales around the house, Sylvester decides to try a more modern-technology approach by using a hi-tech security system and a robot to hunt down and catch Speedy.

== Crew ==
- Story: John Dunn
- Animation: Gerry Chiniquy, Virgil Ross, Bob Matz, Art Leonardi, Lee Halpern
- Layout: Hawley Pratt
- Backgrounds: Tom O'Loughlin
- Film Editor: Treg Brown
- Voice Characterizations: Mel Blanc
- Music: Bill Lava
- Produced by: David H. DePatie
- Directed by: Friz Freleng

== Production ==
This was the final original WB cartoon directed by Friz Freleng. Once the studio closed in 1963 (the same year this cartoon was made), Freleng and former producer David H. DePatie would produce cartoons for Warner Bros. from 1964 to 1967 at DePatie-Freleng Enterprises.

== Home media ==
Nuts and Volts is available on the Looney Tunes Golden Collection: Volume 4 Disc 3.
