= Mouse and Garden =

- Title card
- Directed by: Friz Freleng
- Starring: Mel Blanc; Daws Butler
- Edited by: Treg Brown
- Music by: Milt Franklyn
- Animation by: Arthur Davis; Gerry Chiniquy; Virgil Ross
- Layouts by: Hawley Pratt
- Backgrounds by: Tom O'Loughlin
- Color process: Technicolor
- Production company: Warner Bros. Cartoons
- Distributed by: Warner Bros. Pictures
- Release date: July 16, 1960
- Running time: 7:00
- Country: United States
- Language: English

Mouse and Garden is a 1960 Warner Bros. Looney Tunes cartoon directed by Friz Freleng. The Academy Award-nominated cartoon was released on July 16, 1960, and stars Sylvester.

The title is a play on House & Garden. Sylvester is voiced by Mel Blanc, and Sam Cat by Daws Butler in the style of Frank Fontaine's "John" from The Jack Benny Program and "Crazy Guggenheim" from The Jackie Gleason Show.

== Plot ==
Sylvester and his friend, Sam Cat are rummaging through trash cans for food, until Sylvester spots a mouse sneaking past them. After a little scuffle, the two felines agree to share the mouse for breakfast in the morning, but each frequently tries to get the mouse for himself while the other is asleep. Eventually, in one last attempt with a motorboat, it takes off with both of them, and they end up getting stranded on a tiny island. The cats kick each other repeatedly as the mouse rows past them on a jug singing Moonlight Bay.

== See also ==
- List of American films of 1960
