= Cracked Ice =

1938 film by Frank Tashlin

- Title card
- Directed by: Frank Tashlin
- Story by: Jack Miller
- Produced by: Leon Schlesinger
- Starring: Mel Blanc; Tedd Pierce; Danny Webb
- Music by: Carl W. Stalling
- Animation by: Bob McKimson
- Color process: Technicolor
- Production company: Leon Schlesinger Productions
- Distributed by: Warner Bros. Pictures; The Vitaphone Corporation
- Release date: September 10, 1938
- Running time: 7 min
- Country: United States
- Language: English

Cracked Ice is a 1938 American animated comedy short film directed by Frank Tashlin. The short was released on September 10, 1938. It is part of the Merrie Melodies series.

== Plot ==
A group of animals ice skate on a frozen lake. A black bird is ice skating over barrels until it trips on one and falls into the freezing water. W. C. Squeals (a pig caricature of W. C. Fields) is ice skating with a cigar when he hears the bird calling for help. He calls for a St. Bernard lifeguard, who pulls out an ice cube with the bird inside and gives the bird a shot of margarita to revive him. Jealous, Squeals pretends to have nearly drowned to be gifted a shot of margarita, only for the dog to drink it instead. Squeals is called out by an audience member for his stupidity.

Squeals uses a magnet and a metal bowl loaded with bones to lure the dog, only to fail spectacularly when the dog accidentally slams him. The magnet is launched into the air and falls onto a fish, while the alcohol leaks into the lake. The fish becomes drunk and swims freely, accidentally guiding an axe into cutting a log it is on, cutting a hole around the bird from earlier and tripping Squeals when he prepares to take the alcohol for himself. He accidentally crashes an ice skating competition when his skates are caught by the magnet, impressing the judges with his moves to the point he wins the competition by proxy. As the fish tries to avoid being eaten by a larger fish, Squeals places the trophy on the ground to use it to drink alcohol, only for it to be dragged away to his amusement.

== Home media ==
- LaserDisc: The Golden Age of Looney Tunes Volume 2, Side 1 (unrestored)
- DVD: Looney Tunes Golden Collection: Volume 4, Disc 2 (restored)
