= A Message to Gracias =

- Directed by: Robert McKimson
- Story by: John Dunn
- Starring: Mel Blanc; Roger Green
- Edited by: Treg Brown
- Music by: Bill Lava
- Animation by: George Grandpre; Ted Bonnicksen; Warren Batchelder; Keith Darling; Harry Love (effects animation)
- Layouts by: Robert Gribbroek
- Backgrounds by: Robert Gribbroek
- Color process: Technicolor
- Production company: Warner Bros. Cartoons
- Distributed by: Warner Bros. Pictures
- Release date: February 8, 1964
- Running time: 7 minutes
- Country: United States
- Language: English

A Message to Gracias is a 1964 Warner Bros. Looney Tunes cartoon directed by Robert McKimson. The short was released on February 8, 1964, and stars Speedy Gonzales and Sylvester. The title and plot are a reference to the essay A Message to Garcia.

== Plot ==
The plot of this cartoon involves Mexican Revolutionary mice led by El Supremo, who wants to have an important message brought to General Gracias on the other side of the country. Numerous attempts to deliver the message fail when every messenger is caught and eaten by Sylvester. Desperate, El Supremo's subordinates suggest to summon Speedy to deliver the message.

After overcoming several of Sylvester's attempts to thwart him, Speedy traps Sylvester and delivers the important message to the general—only for it to turn out to be a "Happy Birthday" from El Supremo, who then appears to congratulate Gracias in person. Disgusted because he has gone through all the trouble for such a trivial task, Speedy returns to Sylvester, who is of the same mind. Speedy unties Sylvester, who then chases after the two generals.

== Crew ==
- Story: John Dunn
- Animation: George Grandpré, Ted Bonnicksen, Warren Batchelder, Keith Darling
- Layouts and Backgrounds: Robert Gribbroek
- Effects Animation: Harry Love
- Film Editor: Treg Brown
- Voice Characterization: Mel Blanc, Roger Green
- Music: Bill Lava
- Produced by: David H. DePatie
- Directed by: Robert McKimson

== Home media ==
- DVD - Looney Tunes Golden Collection: Volume 4, Disc 3
