= Bugs and Thugs =

1954 animated short film directed by Friz Freleng

- Lobby card
- Directed by: I. Freleng
- Story by: Warren Foster
- Starring: Mel Blanc
- Music by: Milt Franklyn
- Animation by: Manuel Perez; Ken Champin; Virgil Ross; Arthur Davis
- Layouts by: Hawley Pratt
- Backgrounds by: Irv Wyner
- Color process: Technicolor
- Production company: Warner Bros. Cartoons
- Distributed by: Warner Bros. Pictures; The Vitaphone Corporation
- Release date: March 13, 1954
- Running time: 7 minutes
- Language: English

Bugs and Thugs is a 1954 (Note: While released in 1954, the short was copyrighted on December 28, 1953.) Warner Bros. Looney Tunes cartoon directed by Friz Freleng. The short was released on March 13, 1954, and stars Bugs Bunny, with Rocky and Mugsy. The film is a semi-remake of the 1946 cartoon Racketeer Rabbit. It is also the first Warner Bros short to feature Milt Franklyn as a musical director.

In the film, Bugs mistakes the getaway car of a bank robber for a taxi and enters it uninvited, being taken hostage as a result.

== Plot ==
Bugs Bunny emerges from his hole in a city park, reading the newspaper on his way to his bank to make a withdrawal from his personal depository of carrots. Leaving the bank, Bugs flags down what he thinks is a taxi, but which is actually a getaway car pulling up to let out diminutive bank robber Rocky. As Bugs settles in the back seat, Rocky returns amidst a shootout with bank security, leaps into the car and orders his henchman Mugsy to drive off. Bugs emerges from beneath the many bags of cash. Rocky pulls his gun and asks Bugs "how much he knows" (about the robbery); Bugs misinterprets this and reels off a list of random facts, until Rocky shuts him up and decides to take him as a hostage.

As they continue to drive, Bugs asks Mugsy to stop at a gas station. Bugs gets out of the car and, after receiving a nickel from Mugsy, uses a payphone to call the police to report the bank robbers. Mugsy quickly grabs Bugs and takes him back to the car. As the car speeds off, the policeman on the other end is yanked out through the phone and bounced along the road some distance behind, until the wire snaps, quite literally "disconnecting" the call. Soon after, the car stops at a railroad crossing. The signal warns of an approaching train, and so Rocky tells Bugs to get out and let them know if the coast is clear. Bugs checks the tracks and shouts "all clear". Mugsy drives forward, and the car is struck by a train. The crooks force Bugs at gunpoint to repair the car, but one of the wheels is missing, so Rocky has Bugs act as the wheel, by running alongside the car while holding the right front axle.

Finally, the crooks arrive at their hideout. Once inside, Rocky instructs Mugsy to take Bugs into the other room and "let him have it". Once there, Bugs easily convinces him that Rocky meant for him to let Bugs have his gun. When Mugsy relents, he gets shot by Bugs, stumbles back into the front room and passes out on top of Rocky, who quickly punches him off and storms into the room to handle Bugs himself. As he approaches the door, Bugs imitates both a police siren and the voice of an officer arriving and ordering other policemen to surround the house. Bugs tears out of the room, seemingly panicked about the cops showing up. Bugs hides the robbers in the stove, then pretends to be the police pounding on the front door. Then, he pulls off acting as both the policeman with an Irish accent and himself trying to hide Rocky and Mugsy. While "interrogating" himself, Bugs denies hiding them in the stove, turning on the gas heat of the stove and throwing a lit match inside to "prove" his innocence. The stove explodes, and the "policeman", convinced, leaves. Rocky and Mugsy crawl out of the stove, somewhat scorched and dazed. Not even five seconds after emerging, the real policemen come and, in an almost exact match of Bugs' previous ruse, one of them (with an Irish accent) asks where Rocky and Mugsy are. Just as Bugs is about to throw another lit match into the stove, Rocky and Mugsy quickly run out of the stove and beg to be arrested.

By the next day, Bugs' success in foiling the robbers has led to him beginning a career as a private investigator.

== Reception ==
Jerry Beck writes, "A remake of director Friz Freleng's earlier crime classic Racketeer Rabbit (1946), which featured caricatures of Edward G. Robinson and Peter Lorre as the gangsters, Bugs and Thugs is faster and funnier, has a great modern design (thanks to Hawley Pratt's layouts), and introduces two great new foils — Rocky and Mugsy — for Bugs Bunny."

== Home media ==
Bugs and Thugs is available on the following DVDs:

- Looney Tunes Golden Collection: Volume 1
- Looney Tunes Platinum Collection: Volume 3

The short was also available to stream on HBO Max in some territories until March 2025.

The short is also part of the Ultra HD Blu-ray, Blu-ray and iTunes releases of Goodfellas as a part of a Merrie Melodies & Looney Tunes bonus features compilation that also includes Racketeer Rabbit.

== Cast ==
- Mel Blanc as Bugs Bunny, Rocky, Mugsy and police officers

== See also ==
- List of Bugs Bunny cartoons

== Notes ==
Preceded by Captain Hareblower	Bugs Bunny Cartoons; 1954	Succeeded by No Parking Hare
