= West of the Pesos =

- Directed by: Robert McKimson
- Story by: Tedd Pierce
- Starring: Mel Blanc
- Edited by: Treg Brown
- Music by: Milt Franklyn
- Animation by: Warren Batchelder; Ted Bonnicksen; George Grandpré; Tom Ray
- Layouts by: Bob Givens
- Backgrounds by: William Butler
- Color process: Technicolor
- Distributed by: Warner Bros. Pictures
- Release date: January 23, 1960
- Running time: 6:02
- Language: English

West of the Pesos is a 1960 Warner Bros. Merrie Melodies cartoon short directed by Robert McKimson. The short was released on January 23, 1960, and stars Speedy Gonzales and Sylvester. The title is a play on the 1945 movie West of the Pecos, and peso, the official currency of Mexico.

== Plot ==
In the ACME Laboratorio por Experimento, mice subjected to scientific experiments are depicted as being held captive in cages, expressing concerns about their uncertain fates. Amidst their captivity, the mice engage in various activities, such as card games and harmonica playing, while guard cat Sylvester patrols outside to deter any potential escape attempts. Meanwhile, in the village, the Señorita mice lament the disappearance of their family members and boyfriends.

The village mayor endeavors to rally volunteers for a rescue mission, yet they quickly realize the formidable challenge posed by Sylvester's cunning and agility. In a stroke of hope, a mouse suggests enlisting the assistance of Speedy Gonzales. Despite Speedy's absence on vacation in Guadalajara, the resourceful mice contact him through his sister Carmella, prompting his swift arrival in the village.

Upon Speedy's arrival, he is greeted with jubilation akin to that of a bullfighter entering the arena, catching Sylvester's attention. Speedy boldly taunts the feline, prompting Sylvester to engage in pursuit. However, Speedy outmaneuvers him effortlessly, rescuing fellow mice and thwarting Sylvester's traps with his unparalleled speed and cunning.

Subsequent encounters between Sylvester and Speedy include comedic exchanges such as Speedy's evasion of a rock trap, his use of disguises to smuggle out mice, and his ingenious utilization of train tracks for the rescue operation. Throughout, Speedy's agility and wit prevail, leading to Sylvester's frustration and ultimate defeat.

In the denouement, Speedy is hailed as a hero, receiving adulation from the mice, particularly Carmella. His exuberance culminates in a departure into outer space, leaving the mice to humorously dub him a "loco satellite."

== Home media ==
West of the Pesos is available on the Looney Tunes Golden Collection: Volume 4 Disc 3.

== See also ==
- List of American films of 1960
