= Mel B. Kaufman =

Melville Bernd Kaufman (April 23, 1879 – February 21, 1932) was a prolific American ragtime piano composer.

Among his best known works were "Me-Ow", "More Candy", "Taxi", "Step With Pep" and "Pick A Chicken", the latter of which was advertised as a favorite dance number for Vernon Castle. His numbers were featured by bandleaders such as Vincent Lopez, Earl Fuller, and Joseph C. Smith. Several of his compositions were recorded and turned into piano rolls, and many tunes were used in soundtracks and cartoons into the 1950s.

Kaufman was born in Newark, New Jersey. Beginning in 1919, Kaufman entered into several publishing & recording contracts with the Sam Fox Publishing Company. In 1926, Kaufman endorsed efforts to amend United States copyright law to better protect rights-holders' interests in light of the new radio broadcast medium. After his death, his widow May Z. Kaufman became executor of his estate, and in 1934 sued Sam Fox Publishing Company for unpaid royalties due to synchronization rights (an industry term which didn't exist when the contracts were first written in 1919). Sam Fox Publishing Company sought to rewrite their contract with Kaufman's estate (and presumably other artists) to clarify the differences (in meaning and in accounting) between mechanical reproducing rights and synchronization rights. This resulted in a further settlement arbitrated by ASCAP's John G. Paine, which Sam Fox appealed to the New York Supreme Court.

Kaufman died in New York City.

== Selected compositions ==
- Be Careful (Artur Guttman made an arrangement of this foxtrot for piano and violin)
- Bing! Bing! (foxtrot)
- Cheer Up (one-step)
- Come Across
- Corn-Huskers
- Frisky (foxtrot)
- Good Scout March
- Hamadan (sometimes listed as Hamidan)
- Happy Go Lucky
- I'm a Sentimental Dreamer
- It's A Bird
- Listen to This
- Magnolia Bloom
- Maria (a "novelty fox trot")
- Me-Ow (one-step), later used in the Looney Tunes short Tweety's Circus.
- More Candy (one-step)
- Muslin Rag
- Ouch, which played during a segue in Charlie Chaplin's 1927 reissue of the 1917 movie Shoulder Arms
- Pack Me Up In Your Heart
- Persian Moon
- Pick A Chicken
- Pins and Needles (one-step)
- Play Ball, which was composed for Harold Lloyd's movie The Freshman
- Playtime
- Plenty Sweet
- Squidulum (words by his wife May Z. Kaufman)
- Step with Pep
- Stick Around (also known as Introduce Me)
- Stop It
- Taxi
- Step With Pep
- Umbrellas To Mend
- Up We Go
- Watch It
- Yah-de-Dah (the sheet music cover shows Earl Fuller's band)
