= Michael Maltese =

American screenwriter and storyboard artist (1908–1981)

- Maltese in 1940
- Born: February 6, 1908; New York City, U.S.
- Died: February 22, 1981 (aged 73); Los Angeles, California, U.S.
- Occupations: Screenwriter; storyboard artist
- Years active: 1935–1981
- Employers: Fleischer Studios (1935–1936); Jam Handy Organization (1936–1937); Leon Schlesinger Productions/Warner Bros. Cartoons (1937–1953, 1954–1958); Walter Lantz Productions (1953–1954); Hanna-Barbera (1958–1963; 1965–1972); Sib-Tower 12 Productions (1963–1965); Chuck Jones Productions (1972–1981)
- Spouse: Florence Sass

Michael Maltese (February 6, 1908 – February 22, 1981) was an American screenwriter and storyboard artist for classic animated cartoon shorts. He is best known for working in the 1950s on a series of Looney Tunes and Merrie Melodies cartoons with director Chuck Jones. This collaboration produced many highly acclaimed animated shorts, including 4 of the top 5 "greatest cartoons" as judged by 1000 animation professionals; What's Opera, Doc? tops this list as the best animated short of all time.

== Early life ==
The son of Italian immigrants, Maltese graduated from the National Academy of Design. He married Florence Sass in April 1936; writer Warren Foster served as best man.

== Career ==
Michael Maltese began his career in animation as a cel painter at Fleischer Studios in 1935. A year later, he was fired for quickly moving himself up position after being promoted to an assistant animator.

After a brief stint at the Jam Handy Organization, Maltese was hired by Leon Schlesinger Productions in April 1937 as an in-betweener, and later a storyman due to everyone laughing at his jokes. Maltese would first appear on camera in the 1940 Porky Pig cartoon You Ought to Be in Pictures as a live-action guard, voiced by Mel Blanc, at the Warner Bros. entrance gate who winds up chasing the animated Porky around the Warners lot. The first cartoon he was credited for Warner's was The Haunted Mouse (1941) by Tex Avery, although he wrote rejected gags for The Timid Toreador. Maltese, typically in collaboration with Tedd Pierce, would provide most of the stories for directors Friz Freleng and Chuck Jones from 1943 to 1946, following which he dissolved his partnership with Pierce and mainly worked with Jones. He and Jones collaborated on cartoons like the Academy Award–winning For Scent-imental Reasons (1949), featuring the character Pepé Le Pew, and the animated public health documentary, So Much for So Little (1949) which won that same year for "Best Documentary Short Subject". Maltese was also the voice of the Lou Costello-esque character in Wackiki Wabbit (1943) and the Benito Mussolini duck in The Ducktators (1942).

Some of his earlier works include The Wabbit Who Came to Supper and Fresh Hare, Hare Trigger (which introduced Yosemite Sam) and Baseball Bugs (he was mentioned in an Easter egg in the background of that cartoon in an outfield wall advertisement for "Mike Maltese Ace Dick") for Freleng and Bear Feat, Rabbit of Seville, A Pest in the House, and Rabbit Fire for Jones. Some of his best-known cartoons are Feed the Kitty, Beep, Beep, Rabbit Seasoning, Don't Give Up the Sheep, Duck Amuck, Bully for Bugs, Bewitched Bunny, From A to Z-Z-Z-Z, and Beanstalk Bunny, all of which were directed by Jones. He also wrote One Froggy Evening, the first appearance of future Warner Brothers mascot Michigan J. Frog.

Some of his later Warner cartoons included Ali Baba Bunny, Robin Hood Daffy, the seminal What's Opera, Doc? and Duck Dodgers in the 24½th Century for Jones, Rabbit Romeo and Fox-Terror for Robert McKimson and Person to Bunny (the final occasion Arthur Q. Bryan voiced Elmer Fudd) and Here Today, Gone Tamale (the only Speedy Gonzales cartoon he ever wrote) for Freleng. Following the shuttering of Jones's unit in 1953 (at the height of the 3-D craze), Maltese was hired by Walter Lantz Productions as writer of some Woody Woodpecker cartoons: Helter Shelter, Witch Crafty (co-written with Homer Brightman), Real Gone Woody, Square Shootin' Square and Bedtime Bedlam. He also is the writer of Chilly Willy's Academy Award-nominated theatrical short The Legend of Rockabye Point, directed by fellow Warner alumnus Tex Avery. Jones's unit would be resurrected early in 1954, with Maltese departing Lantz to rejoin his longtime collaborator several months afterwards; Maltese's first post-shutdown Warner credits by release would be on Rocket-Bye Baby and Gee Whiz-z-z-z-z-z-z, a Wile E. Coyote/Road Runner short.

Maltese departed Jones's unit for the second and final time in 1958, with his final credit appearing on 1961's The Mouse on 57th Street. From 1958 until 1972, he worked at Hanna-Barbera Productions on television cartoons such as The Yogi Bear Show, The Quick Draw McGraw Show, The Flintstones, and Wacky Races. He wrote for a total of 200 storyboards for Hanna-Barbera. He briefly worked with Jones at Sib-Tower 12 Productions on writing Tom and Jerry shorts from 1963 to 1965.

Maltese also wrote comic books published by Western Publishing, including for many of the Warner Brothers and Hanna-Barbera characters whose animated exploits he scripted.

== Death ==
Maltese died on February 22, 1981, at Los Angeles's Good Samaritan Hospital after a six-month bout with cancer, aged 73. His last work was in Duck Dodgers and the Return of the 24½th Century, released in 1980.
