= Warren Foster =

American writer, storyboard artist and composer (1904–1971)

- Born: October 24, 1904; Brooklyn, New York, U.S.
- Died: December 13, 1971 (aged 67); San Clemente, California, U.S.
- Occupations: Writer, animator
- Years active: 1935-1966

Warren Foster (October 24, 1904 – December 13, 1971) was an American writer and animator. He was best known for his work at Warner Bros. Cartoons, contributing prominently (mostly stories) towards the Looney Tunes and Merrie Melodies series; he garnered acclaim not by his animation, but by his stories that proved to be influential in animation. He worked for Hanna-Barbera at a similar role until his retirement.

== Early life ==
He was born in Brooklyn, New York to Marion B. Foster and Charles C. Foster. Foster was educated at Brooklyn Technical High School and later at the Pratt Institute, joining ASCAP in 1956.

== Career ==
Foster's long career with animation began in 1935 as a cel opaquer for Fleischer Studios, moving up to the story department a year later. He wrote two Popeye cartoons The Spinach Roadster and Proteck the Weakerist. He started at Leon Schlesinger Productions in 1938 as a writer on the Porky Pig short, Porky in Wackyland, and would collaborate primarily with Bob Clampett until the early 1940s. By 1944, Foster had become both Clampett and Frank Tashlin's primary storyman; upon the departure of both directors, Tashlin's replacement Robert McKimson became Foster's sole collaborator for the remainder of the 1940s. In 1949, veteran director Friz Freleng, who had become increasingly complimentary of Foster's abilities, poached Foster from McKimson's unit and installed him as his primary storyman, a position Foster would hold until 1957 with the Tweety short, Tweet Dreams (ultimately released in 1959); Foster, having written around 171 shorts for the studio, would depart Warner's after finishing work on the short. He was the composer of Tweety's theme song, I Taut I Taw a Puddy-Tat.

He worked, sometimes uncredited, on cartoons considered among the greatest ever, including Porky in Wackyland, Book Revue, Show Biz Bugs, The Great Piggy Bank Robbery and Daffy Doodles, the latter four featuring Daffy Duck, Catty Cornered featuring Sylvester the Cat in 1953 and Bugs and Thugs featuring Bugs Bunny in 1954.

Upon departing Warner's in 1957, Foster was initially employed at John Sutherland Productions, providing the screenplays for industrial films such as Rhapsody in Steel. In 1959, on the recommendation of former Warner alumnus Michael Maltese, Foster was hired by Hanna-Barbera, where he spent the next seven years as a writer on a number of notable animated programs, beginning with The Huckleberry Hound Show. He contributed to the comedy, plot, and character development of shows like The Yogi Bear Show, Loopy De Loop and The Flintstones, including his final work on the feature-length The Man Called Flintstone in 1966.

Iwao Takamoto said of Foster's work on The Flintstones: "I believe his influence was one of the key factors for its success".

Foster is credited with the controversial banned cartoons Coal Black and de Sebben Dwarfs and Tin Pan Alley Cats.

== Death ==
Warren Foster died on December 13, 1971, in San Clemente, California. His burial is located at El Toro Memorial Park in Lake Forest, California.
