= Gerry Chiniquy =

American animator (1912–1989)

- Born: Germain Adolph Chiniquy; June 23, 1912; Illinois, U.S.
- Died: November 22, 1989 (aged 77); Ventura County, California, U.S.
- Occupation: Animator
- Years active: 1932–1987
- Employer(s): Walt Disney Productions (1932–1940); Warner Bros. Cartoons (1940–1963); Hanna-Barbera (1963–1964); Playhouse Pictures (1964–1965); DePatie–Freleng Enterprises (1965–1981); Marvel Productions (1981–1987)

Germain Adolph Chiniquy (pronounced "chin-a-KEE"; June 23, 1912 – November 22, 1989) was an American animator known for his work with Friz Freleng at both Warner Bros. Cartoons and DePatie–Freleng Enterprises.

Chiniquy joined Freleng's animation team in the early 1940s. His work can best be seen in the many "dance numbers" that Freleng liked to use in his shorts. As crewmembers working on WB's cartoons were seldom credited, Chiniquy and the other animators would often add their names into the backgrounds of cartoons. Chiniquy's name can be seen in Bugs Bunny Rides Again (1948); look for "G. Chiniquy, Blacksmith" painted on a rooftop. Chiniquy also made a cameo appearance in the live action portion of You Ought to Be in Pictures (1940), as the director calling for "Quiet on the set!" Chiniquy also briefly animated for Chuck Jones, providing animation for the U.S. Air Force recruitment film A Hitch in Time (1955). When Freleng left Warner Bros. in 1962, Chiniquy was promoted to director. He made Dumb Patrol and Hawaiian Aye Aye for release in early 1964.

After the original Warner Bros. Cartoon Studio was shut down in 1963, Chiniquy later moved his animation work to Hanna-Barbera. Chiniquy later on animated for commercials at Playhouse Pictures from 1964 to 1965.

Chiniquy followed Freleng to DFE, and soon he was promoted to director. Chiniquy directed many of the theatrical Pink Panther, The Inspector, The Ant and the Aardvark, and Hoot Kloot shorts.

== Cartoons ==
- GI Joe
- Hey There It's Yogi Bear!
- The Jetsons
- Looney Tunes
- Merrie Melodies
- My Little Pony
- Raggedy Ann and Andy: A Musical Adventure
- The Transformers
