= Milt Franklyn =

American composer and arranger (1897–1962)

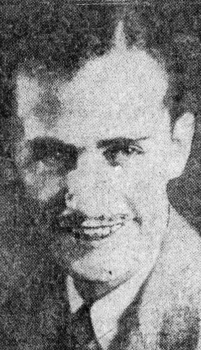
- Franklyn in 1928

Background information
- Born: Milton Julius Frumkin; September 16, 1897; New York City, U.S.
- Died: April 24, 1962 (aged 64) Los Angeles, California, U.S.
- Genres: Film score; soundtrack
- Occupations: Composer; arranger
- Years active: 1926–1962
- Label: Warner Bros.

Milton J. Franklyn (born Milton Julius Frumkin; September 16, 1897 – April 24, 1962) was an American musical composer and arranger who worked on the Warner Bros. Looney Tunes animated cartoons, working alongside and later succeeding Carl Stalling.

== Early life and education ==
Franklyn was born in New York City September 16, 1897, to the marriage of Julius B. Frumkin (1874–1913) and Fanny Hertzberg (maiden; 1876–1932). Julius Frumkin had been the proprietor of Frumkin's Cigar Stores in Salt Lake City, notably the Mission Cigar Store at 139 South Main Street. Franklyn was three years old when his family moved from New York to Salt Lake City.

Franklyn attended high school in Salt Lake City and graduated June 10, 1915. He finished one year at the University of Utah. He was the state junior tennis champion in Utah for six years. The next two years were spent at the University of California, Berkeley, then he began a term at Pennsylvania University when he was called to service in World War One. Franklyn did not serve overseas; he trained as a naval officer for three months and then the Armistice was signed on November 11, 1918. He returned to Berkeley to finish his education.

== Career ==
As Franklyn could play a number of instruments, he joined a band in San Francisco and for the next few years played at the Palace and St. Francis hotels. He began his own nine-piece orchestra, known at various times as the Peninsula Band, (Note: Milt Franklyn was the leader of the house band at an elaborate movie palace – the Peninsula Theatre, in Burlingame, California – when it opened October 12, 1926) the Super Soloists, and the Merrimakers, and appeared in San Mateo (1926 to June 1927), where he also owned a music store, and San Jose (1928 to January 1929), where he was Master of Ceremonies and wrote revues for the California Theatre before moving on to Fresno and Oakland. For two years he was emcee with Fanchon and Marco at Fox West Coast in San Diego; musical director and emcee with Paramount Publix Corporation, travelling to Seattle, Denver, Houston and Toledo; and finally worked on the Loew's circuit in Providence, Rhode Island and New York City from 1932 to 1935. Franklyn quit vaudeville to go to Hollywood in 1935 and spent a year doing occasional work.

In early 1936, he joined Warner Bros. Cartoons as music arranger to Carl Stalling, becoming a music director in 1954. The first cartoon with Franklyn credited as a composer was Bugs and Thugs, released in 1954, though Franklyn estimated at the time his 599th cartoon for Warners was Past Perfumance. Franklyn always composed his scores at home early in the morning; he only went to the studio to watch the 30-piece Warner Bros. Orchestra record the music or to view the finished cartoon. Among the songs Franklyn is said to have composed with director Chuck Jones and writer Michael Maltese is "The Michigan Rag" for the 1955 cartoon One Froggy Evening, featuring Michigan J. Frog. However, the ASCAP database lists only Maltese as the composer. He became the sole composer in 1958 upon Stalling's retirement.

== Death ==
Franklyn died of a heart attack on April 24, 1962. At the time of his death, Franklyn was composing the score for a Tweety cartoon, The Jet Cage. The first two minutes of the cartoon were scored by Franklyn, the rest by William Lava, who had been working on the Warner Bros. main lot and replaced him as musical director. The Jet Cage opening credits lists Franklyn and not Lava, while the ASCAP database credits Franklyn with composing the opening title, with no mention of Lava, but a change in composing style in the cartoon is noticeable. The Foghorn Leghorn short Mother Was a Rooster, which immediately followed The Jet Cage in release date, was the last for which Franklyn had written a complete score for.

Franklyn joined ASCAP in 1954 and was a member of the Academy of TV Arts and Sciences.

After his death, Franklyn's music also appeared in Bugs Bunny on Broadway.
