= Looney Tunes Golden Collection =

Series of DVD box sets from Warner Home Video

The Looney Tunes Golden Collection is a series of six four-disc DVD sets from Warner Home Video, each containing about 60 Looney Tunes and Merrie Melodies animated shorts originally released from the 1930s to 1960s. The initial run of the series was in folding cardboard packaging issued gradually from October 28, 2003, to October 21, 2008. A boxed set combining all six volumes was released in 2011, and each volume was reissued separately in standard Amaray-style cases in 2020.

== Overview ==
The Golden Collection series was launched following the success of the Walt Disney Treasures series which collected archived Disney material.

These collections were made possible after the merger of Time Warner (which owned the color cartoons released from August 1, 1948, onward, as well as the black-and-white Looney Tunes, the post-Harman/Ising black-and-white Merrie Melodies and the first H/I Merrie Melodies entry Lady, Play Your Mandolin!) and Turner Broadcasting System (which owned the color cartoons released prior to August 1, 1948, and the remaining Harman/Ising Merrie Melodies; most of these cartoons had been released as part of The Golden Age of Looney Tunes LaserDisc series), along with the subsequent transfer of video rights to the Turner library from MGM Home Entertainment to Warner Home Video.

The cartoons included on the set are uncut, unedited, uncensored, and digitally restored and remastered from the original black-and-white and successive exposure Technicolor film negatives (or, in the case of the Cinecolor shorts, the Technicolor reprints). However, some of the cartoons in these collections are derived from the "Blue Ribbon" reissues (altered from their original versions with their revised front-and-end credit sequences), as the original titles for these cartoons are presumably lost. Where the original titles, instead of the "Blue Ribbon" titles, still exist, Warner has taken the "Blue Ribbon" titles out.

A handful of cartoons in the first two collections and the bonus cartoons on Volume 6 have digital video noise reduction (DVNR) artifacting. The noise reduction process sometimes unintentionally erases or blurs some of the picture on certain scenes of the cartoons, which has caused controversy among some Looney Tunes fans. The most recent collections, however, lack such artifacting. Since August 2007, Warner Home Video has been quietly reissuing copies of the fourth disc of Volume 2 that lacks artifacting and interlacing because of numerous complaints by consumers.

Beginning with Volume 3, a warning was printed on the packaging explaining that the collection is intended for adults and the content may not be suitable for children. This goes along with Whoopi Goldberg's filmed introduction in Volume 3 which explains the history of ethnic imagery that frequently appears in cartoons of the 1930s and 1940s. Beginning with Volume 4, a singular disclaimer text card similar to Goldberg's spoken disclaimer precedes each disc's main menu. This is also seen on the Tom and Jerry Spotlight Collection discs and even on the back of the Woody Woodpecker and Friends Classic Cartoon Collection discs (though for the latter, they are from Universal, not Warner Bros.).

The DVDs also feature several special features including interviews/documentaries of the people behind the cartoons such as Friz Freleng, Bob Clampett, Tex Avery, Robert McKimson, Chuck Jones, musical conductor Carl Stalling and voice-artist Mel Blanc, pencil tests, and audio commentaries by animation historians Jerry Beck, Michael Barrier and Greg Ford, as well as current animators Paul Dini, Eric Goldberg and John Kricfalusi and voice actors Stan Freberg and June Foray. In addition to the appearances by the above-mentioned, there is interview footage of Stan Freberg, June Foray, Noel Blanc, Billy West, Keith Scott, Mark Evanier, Bob Bergen, Joe Alaskey, Bill Melendez, Willie Ito, Corny Cole, Peter Alvarado and the children of the various directors: Robert McKimson Jr., Ruth Clampett, Sybil Freleng and Linda Jones. Also included are several obscure, miscellaneous pieces of Looney Tunes media, such as original segments from The Bugs Bunny Show, theatrical compilation releases, trailers, rediscovered cut content, clean music and sound effect tracks of various shorts, and reconstructions of partially lost material. Audio footage of Mel Blanc in recording sessions is heard as a bonus feature on several of the discs, as is an audio clip of Arthur Q. Bryan rehearsing a line as Elmer Fudd in What's Opera, Doc? and a recorded session of the Warner Bros. studio orchestra. In total, there are 356 cartoons (18 more than The Golden Age of Looney Tunes) spread throughout the six volumes.

In some regions, such as Regions 2 and 4, each disc in each volume is packaged (or re-packaged) separately. In this format, it was titled "Looney Tunes Collection" omitting 'Golden' from the title. There were no boxes to group the various volumes, and no numbering on the spine of each individual cover, so storage order was not easily maintained. The Region 1 box set has since been released in Regions 2 and 4.

== Releases ==
=== Volume 1 ===
Volume 1 (released on October 28, 2003) contains 56 cartoons (all in color) mostly from the 1950s with a smaller selection of shorts from the 1940s. Popular shorts include:

Disc 1
- Baseball Bugs
- Rabbit Seasoning
- Long-Haired Hare
- High Diving Hare
- Bully for Bugs
- Wabbit Twouble
- Ballot Box Bunny
- Rabbit of Seville

Disc 2

- Duck Amuck
- Drip-Along Daffy
- Scaredy Cat
- The Ducksters
- The Scarlet Pumpernickel
- Rabbit Fire
- Duck Dodgers in the 24½th Century

Disc 3

- Fast and Furry-ous
- Hair-Raising Hare
- Haredevil Hare
- For Scent-imental Reasons
- Feed the Kitty
- Bugs Bunny Gets the Boid

Disc 4

- Canary Row
- Bugs and Thugs
- Speedy Gonzales
- Devil May Hare

==== Disc-by-disc breakdown ====
- Disc one is dedicated to Bugs Bunny.
- Disc two is dedicated to Daffy Duck and Porky Pig.
- Discs three and four consist of an assortment of shorts featuring other characters, grouped by director: Chuck Jones and Bob Clampett on disc three, Friz Freleng and Robert McKimson on disc four.

=== Volume 2 ===
Volume 2 (released on November 2, 2004) contains a broader selection of cartoons (58 in color and 2 in black-and-white) from the 1930s, 1940s, and 1950s, including:

Disc 1
- The Big Snooze
- Broomstick Bunny
- Bugs Bunny Rides Again
- Little Red Riding Rabbit
- Tortoise Beats Hare
- Baby Buggy Bunny

Disc 2

- Beep, Beep
- Going! Going! Gosh!
- Stop! Look! And Hasten!
- Gee Whiz-z-z-z-z-z-z
- The Dover Boys at Pimento University
- A Bear for Punishment

Disc 3

- Bad Ol' Putty Tat
- Gift Wrapped
- Snow Business
- Tweetie Pie
- Kitty Kornered
- Baby Bottleneck
- The Great Piggy Bank Robbery
- Porky in Wackyland

Disc 4

- Back Alley Oproar
- Book Revue
- A Corny Concerto
- Three Little Bops
- One Froggy Evening
- What's Opera, Doc?
- You Ought to Be in Pictures

This is the first volume to have 60 cartoons, which would continue to be the "standard" number in later volumes (though most would also include additional "bonus" cartoons).

==== Disc-by-disc breakdown ====
- Disc one, as in the first edition, contains only Bugs Bunny cartoons.
- Disc two contains eleven Road Runner and Wile E. Coyote shorts, along with four cartoons from Road Runner and Wile E. Coyote creator Chuck Jones.
- Disc three contains nine Sylvester/Tweety shorts, along with six cartoons starring Daffy Duck and/or Porky Pig.
- Disc four is an all-stars disc, though there is some relation between each cartoon on the disc: they are either musicals, Hollywood parodies, set on a stage, or incorporate other forms of show business.

=== Volume 3 ===
Volume 3 (released on October 25, 2005) contains a selection of cartoons (52 in color and 8 in black-and-white) mostly from the 1930s and 1940s, but with some from the 1950s and 1960s including popular shorts such as:

Disc 1
- Hare Tonic
- A Hare Grows in Manhattan
- Hillbilly Hare
- Duck! Rabbit, Duck!

Disc 2

- Daffy Duck in Hollywood
- Thugs with Dirty Mugs
- Swooner Crooner
- The Last Hungry Cat

Disc 3

- I Haven't Got a Hat
- Porky's Romance
- Porky's Party
- Porky in Egypt
- Pigs in a Polka
- Porky Pig's Feat
- Robin Hood Daffy
- Claws for Alarm

Disc 4

- Super-Rabbit
- A Gruesome Twosome
- Draftee Daffy
- Falling Hare
- Birds Anonymous
- An Itch in Time
- Odor-able Kitty
- Walky Talky Hawky

==== Disc-by-disc breakdown ====
- Disc one, as with previous volumes, is only Bugs Bunny.
- Disc two features Hollywood caricatures and parodies.
- Disc three mainly concerns Porky Pig, with a few other pig-related cartoons thrown in.
- Disc four is the all-stars disc.

=== Volume 4 ===
Volume 4 (released on November 14, 2006) contains selections (51 in color and 9 in black-and-white) ranging from 1936 to 1966 (the latest Looney Tunes cartoon yet), including popular shorts such as:

Disc 1
- Rabbit Hood
- Operation: Rabbit
- Mississippi Hare
- 8 Ball Bunny
- Knighty Knight Bugs

Disc 2

- The Case of the Stuttering Pig
- Plane Daffy
- Puss N' Booty
- The Stupid Cupid

Disc 3

- Cat-Tails For Two
- Tabasco Road
- Mexicali Shmoes
- The Pied Piper of Guadalupe

Disc 4

- The Night Watchman
- The Aristo-Cat
- Dough Ray Me-ow
- Mouse and Garden

==== Disc-by-disc breakdown ====
- Disc one continues the tradition of the only-Bugs Bunny disc.
- Disc two is dedicated to director Frank Tashlin.
- Disc three contains only Speedy Gonzales cartoons.
- Disc four consists of cartoons starring obscure Looney Tunes cats, with two Sylvester cartoons thrown in for good measure.

=== Volume 5 ===
Volume 5 (released on October 30, 2007) contains 41 color cartoons and 19 black-and-white cartoons (the most of any set thus far), including popular shorts such as:

Disc 1
- Ali Baba Bunny
- Buccaneer Bunny
- A Pest in the House
- Stupor Duck
- The Stupor Salesman
- The Abominable Snow Rabbit
- You Were Never Duckier

Disc 2

- Bewitched Bunny
- The Bear's Tale
- Goldimouse and the Three Cats
- Little Red Walking Hood
- The Trial of Mr. Wolf

Disc 3

- Buckaroo Bugs
- Hare Ribbin'
- The Old Grey Hare
- The Wise Quacking Duck
- The Daffy Doc
- A Tale of Two Kitties
- Eatin' on the Cuff

Disc 4

- Porky at the Crocadero
- Scrap Happy Daffy
- Gold Diggers of '49
- Porky's Preview
- Wholly Smoke

==== Disc-by-disc breakdown ====
- Disc one features Bugs Bunny and Daffy Duck. This is the first time that the first disc is not entirely dedicated to Bugs Bunny, now sharing the spotlight with Daffy Duck.
- Disc two contains parodies of fairy tale stories, mostly of "Little Red Riding Hood".
- Disc three honors the work of director Bob Clampett.
- Disc four features Porky Pig and other early classics - all in black-and-white (the first such disc in the LTGC).

=== Volume 6 ===
Volume 6 (released on October 21, 2008) concludes the entire series of the Golden Collection. The ratio of color to black-and-white cartoons (41 to 19) is the same as the previous volume. This volume contains popular shorts such as:

Disc 1
- Hare Trigger
- Crowing Pains
- My Favorite Duck
- Satan's Waitin'
- Bear Feat
- Dog Gone South
- A Ham in a Role

Disc 2

- Herr Meets Hare
- Russian Rhapsody
- The Draft Horse
- The Ducktators

Disc 3

- Smile, Darn Ya, Smile!
- Bosko's Picture Show
- Ride Him, Bosko!
- A Cartoonist's Nightmare

Disc 4

- Horton Hatches the Egg
- Fresh Airedale
- Chow Hound
- Rocket-Bye Baby
- Much Ado About Nutting
- The Hole Idea
- Now Hear This
- Page Miss Glory

==== Disc-by-disc breakdown ====
- Disc one features an all-star collection.
- Disc two features cartoons with a World War II theme (World War I in the case of Bosko the Doughboy).
- Disc three features early 1930s black-and-white cartoons that star Bosko, Buddy and other characters.
- Disc four features a collection of one-shots.

== Re-release ==
On December 27, 2011, Warner re-packaged all volumes in a single boxed set. From January through June 2020, each volume was reissued separately in standard Amaray-style cases.

== Other DVD and Blu-ray releases of Looney Tunes ==
=== Looney Tunes: Spotlight Collection ===
Concurrently with the Golden Collections, Warner Home Video also released the Looney Tunes: Spotlight Collection, each volume of which packaged half of the cartoons of a Golden Collection, on two DVDs. The exception to this practice was in 2005, with Warner Home Video instead releasing the somewhat-misnamed Looney Tunes Movie Collection, which featured DVDs containing The Bugs Bunny/Road Runner Movie and Bugs Bunny's 3rd Movie: 1001 Rabbit Tales.

=== Looney Tunes Super Stars ===
In November 2009, it was reported that two new single-disc DVD releases, with 15 cartoons each, would be released in April 2010. It was also reported that these 30 cartoons would not contain any duplicates that had already been released as part of the Looney Tunes Golden Collection releases. This series of DVDs is called Looney Tunes Super Stars and the first two titles are Bugs Bunny: Hare Extraordinaire and Daffy Duck: Frustrated Fowl. These new DVDs still have the cartoons digitally restored and remastered - in addition to being shown uncut and uncensored. A second set of Looney Tunes Super Stars DVDs was released on November 30, 2010. The titles in the second wave are Foghorn Leghorn & Friends: Barnyard Bigmouth and Tweety & Sylvester: Feline Fwenzy (which featured a collection of 15 previously on-DVD shorts).

Some viewers noted discs of the first wave proved to be cropped and distorted and otherwise poorly restored to present the shorts in "widescreen" as opposed to their original aspect ratio (though these were just for the post-1953 shorts). Warner Bros. stated the reason for this was that all post-1953 WB shorts were filmed in fullscreen ratio and shown in matted-widescreen in theaters.

On December 1, 2010, animation expert Jerry Beck explained on the Shokus Internet Radio call-in talk program, Stu's Show that Warner aimed this series not at collectors, but at the mass market who expect it to fit on their widescreen TVs. He speculated that at some point down the road there would probably be a double-dip release of those shorts in a collector's DVD version with the video in fullscreen format. However, the Foghorn Leghorn disc contains both the matted-widescreen versions and the original fullscreen (and would most likely continue for future waves featuring new-to-DVD shorts). Jerry Beck stated on Stu's Show on December 1, 2010, that 2011 would see new Super Stars releases, such as a release titled Road Runner & Wile E. Coyote (which features new-to-DVD shorts), another Sylvester release titled Sylvester & Hippety Hopper (with more new-to-DVD shorts) and another Bugs release (with double dips).

=== Looney Tunes Platinum Collection ===
Another new series, Looney Tunes Platinum Collection, was released on Blu-ray. The first volume was released on November 15, 2011. A 2-disc DVD version of the Platinum Collection was made available on July 3, 2012. The first two discs overlap with releases from the Golden and Super Stars collections. Two more volumes were released on Blu-ray Disc and DVD in the following years.

=== Looney Tunes Mouse Chronicles: The Chuck Jones Collection ===
In 2012, Warner Home Video released a 2-disc Blu-ray Disc and DVD set titled Looney Tunes Mouse Chronicles: The Chuck Jones Collection that contained both Sniffles and Hubie and Bertie's entire filmography.

=== Porky Pig 101 ===
In 2017, the Warner Archive Collection released a 5-disc DVD set called Porky Pig 101 featuring the first 101 cartoons of Porky Pig's filmography (all 99 black-and-white cartoons originally released between 1935 and 1943, and two color cartoons released in the late 1930s).

=== Bugs Bunny 80th Anniversary Collection ===
In 2020, Warner Home Video released a 3-disc Blu-ray Disc set collecting 60 Bugs Bunny cartoons, all digitally restored in HD, including 40 cartoons previously unavailable on DVD or Blu-ray Disc.

=== Looney Tunes Collector's Choice ===
In January 2023, Warner Archive announced they would be releasing newly restored to disc shorts via the single disc Looney Tunes Collector's Choice Blu-ray series, with the first volume releasing on May 30, 2023.

=== Looney Tunes Collector's Vault ===
On March 14, 2025, Warner Archive announced a spiritual successor to the Collector's Choice series, entitled Looney Tunes Collector's Vault - which would include 2 discs and contain 50 cartoons, with the first volume releasing on June 17, 2025.

== Available shorts ==
This is a listing of the shorts in the Warner Bros.' Looney Tunes and Merrie Melodies series currently available on the Looney Tunes Golden Collection DVDs, and its successors: Looney Tunes Super Stars, Looney Tunes Platinum Collection, Looney Tunes Mouse Chronicles: The Chuck Jones Collection, The Essential Bugs Bunny, The Essential Daffy Duck, Porky Pig 101, Bugs Bunny 80th Anniversary Collection, Looney Tunes Collector's Choice, and Looney Tunes Collector's Vault.

=== Key ===
- = Looney Tunes
- = Merrie Melodies
- = was reissued as a Blue Ribbon Merrie Melodie
- NT = Non-theatrical shorts
- V# = Volume, Number
- NR = unrestored
- cw = Cropped to Widescreen
- s = Included as a Special Feature
- GC = Looney Tunes Golden Collection
- PC = Looney Tunes Platinum Collection
- BB = Looney Tunes Super Stars' Bugs Bunny: Hare Extraordinaire
- DD = Looney Tunes Super Stars' Daffy Duck: Frustrated Fowl
- FL = Looney Tunes Super Stars' Foghorn Leghorn & Friends: Barnyard Bigmouth
- SH = Looney Tunes Super Stars' Road Runner & Wile E. Coyote: Supergenius Hijinks
- PLP = Looney Tunes Super Stars' Pepe Le Pew: Zee Best of Zee Best
- PP = Looney Tunes Super Stars' Porky & Friends: Hilarious Ham
- FF = Looney Tunes Super Stars' Tweety & Sylvester: Feline Fwenzy
- WW = Looney Tunes Super Stars' Bugs Bunny: Wascally Wabbit
- MM = Looney Tunes Super Stars' Sylvester & Hippety Hopper: Marsupial Mayhem
- MC = Looney Tunes Mouse Chronicles: The Chuck Jones Collection
- EBB = The Essential Bugs Bunny
- EDD = The Essential Daffy Duck
- PP101 = Porky Pig 101
- BB80 = Bugs Bunny 80th Anniversary Collection
- CC = Looney Tunes Collector's Choice
- CV = Looney Tunes Collector's Vault

=== Cartoons available on DVD and Blu-Ray ===
1. Sinkin' in the Bathtub (Harman and Ising/Apr/CV V3) - 1930
2. Congo Jazz (Harman and Ising/Sep/GC V6) - 1930
3. The Booze Hangs High (Harman and Ising/Nov/GC V6) - 1930
4. Lady, Play Your Mandolin! (Ising/Aug 2/CV V3) - 1931
5. Smile, Darn Ya, Smile! (Ising/Sep 5/GC V6) - 1931
6. One More Time (Ising/Oct 3/GC V6) - 1931
7. Bosko the Doughboy (Harman/Oct 17/GC V6) - 1931
8. You Don't Know What You're Doin'! (Ising/Oct 31/GC V6) - 1931
9. Ride Him, Bosko! (Harman/Sep 17/GC V6) - 1932
10. Bosko in Person (Harman and Freleng/Feb 11/GC V6) - 1933
11. Shuffle Off to Buffalo (Ising/Jul 8/GC V6) - 1933
12. The Dish Ran Away with the Spoon (Ising/Aug 5/GC V6) - 1933
13. Bosko's Picture Show (Harman and Freleng/Aug 26/GC V6) - 1933
14. We're in the Money (Ising/Aug 26/GC V6) - 1933
15. Buddy's Day Out (Palmer/Sep 9/GC V6) - 1933
16. I've Got to Sing a Torch Song (Palmer/Sep 23/GC V5) - 1933
17. Buddy's Beer Garden (Duvall/Nov 18/GC V6) - 1933
18. Honeymoon Hotel (Duvall/Feb 17/CC V3) - 1934
19. Beauty and the Beast (Freleng/Apr 14/CV V1) - 1934
20. Shake Your Powder Puff (Freleng/Sep 29/CV V3) - 1934
21. Buddy's Circus (King/Aug 25/GC V6) - 1934
22. Mr. and Mrs. Is the Name (Freleng/Jan 19/CC V3) - 1935
23. Country Boy (Freleng/Feb 9/CV V2) - 1935
24. I Haven't Got a Hat (Freleng/Mar 9/GC V3/PP101) - 1935
25. My Green Fedora (Freleng/May 4/CV V3) - 1935
26. The Country Mouse (Freleng/Jul 13/CV V3) - 1935
27. A Cartoonist's Nightmare (King/Sep 14/GC V6) - 1935
28. Hollywood Capers (King/Oct 19/GC V3) - 1935
29. Gold Diggers of '49 (Avery/Nov 2/GC V5/PP101) - 1935
30. Billboard Frolics (Freleng/Nov 9/CV V3) - 1935
31. Boom Boom (King/Feb 29/PP101 NR) - 1936
32. Miss Glory (Avery/Mar 7/GC V6/PC V2) - 1936
33. Alpine Antics (King/Mar 9/GC V5/PP101) - 1936
34. The Blow Out (Avery/Apr 4/PP101 NR) - 1936
35. Westward Whoa (King/Apr 25/PP101 NR) - 1936
36. Plane Dippy (Avery/Apr 30/PP101 NR) - 1936
37. Let It Be Me (Freleng/May 2/CV V1) - 1936
38. I'd Love to Take Orders from You (Avery/May 16/CV V1) - 1936
39. Fish Tales (King/May 23/PP101 NR) - 1936
40. Shanghaied Shipmates (King/Jun 20/PP101 NR) - 1936
41. Porky's Pet (King/Jul 11/PP101 NR) - 1936
42. I Love to Singa (Avery/Jul 18/GC V2/PC V1) - 1936
43. Porky the Rain-Maker (Avery/Aug 1/PP101 NR) - 1936
44. Porky's Poultry Plant (Tashlin/Aug 22/GC V4/PP101) - 1936
45. Milk and Money (Avery/Oct 3/GC V5/PP101) - 1936
46. Porky's Moving Day (King/Oct 7/PP101 NR) - 1936
47. Boulevardier from the Bronx (Freleng/Oct 10/CV V2) - 1936
48. Don't Look Now (Freleng/Nov 7/CV V3) - 1936
49. Little Beau Porky (Tashlin/Nov 14/GC V4/PP101) - 1936
50. The Coo-Coo Nut Grove (Freleng/Nov 28/GC V3) - 1936
51. The Village Smithy (Avery/Dec 5/PP101 NR) - 1936
52. Porky in the North Woods (Tashlin/Dec 19/GC V4/PP101) - 1936
53. Porky the Wrestler (Avery/Jan 9/PP101 NR) - 1937
54. Pigs Is Pigs (Freleng/Jan 30/GC V3) - 1937
55. Porky's Road Race (Tashlin/Feb 6/GC V3/PP101) - 1937
56. Picador Porky (Avery/Feb 27/PP101 NR) - 1937
57. I Only Have Eyes For You (Avery/Mar 6/CC V3) - 1937
58. Porky's Romance (Tashlin/Apr 3/GC V3/PP101) - 1937
59. She Was an Acrobat's Daughter (Freleng/Apr 10/GC V3) - 1937
60. Porky's Duck Hunt (Avery/Apr 17/EDD/PP101/CV V1) - 1937
61. Porky and Gabby (Iwerks/May 15/PP101 NR) - 1937
62. Porky's Building (Tashlin/Jun 19/PP101 NR) - 1937
63. Streamlined Greta Green (Freleng/Jun 19/CC V4) - 1937
64. Porky's Super Service (Iwerks/Jul 3/PP101 NR) - 1937
65. Egghead Rides Again (Avery/Jul 17/CC V3) - 1937
66. Porky's Badtime Story (Clampett/Jul 24/PP101 NR) - 1937
67. Porky's Railroad (Tashlin/Aug 7/GC V4/PP101) - 1937
68. Get Rich Quick Porky (Clampett/Aug 28/PP101 NR) - 1937
69. Speaking of the Weather (Tashlin/Sep 4/GC V3) - 1937
70. Porky's Garden (Avery/Sep 11/PP101 NR) - 1937
71. I Wanna Be a Sailor (Avery/Sep 25/CC V2) - 1937
72. Rover's Rival (Clampett/Oct 9/PP101 NR) - 1937
73. The Lyin' Mouse (Freleng/Oct 16/CV V3) - 1937
74. The Case of the Stuttering Pig (Tashlin/Oct 30/GC V4/PP101) - 1937
75. Little Red Walking Hood (Avery/Nov 6/GC V5) - 1937
76. Porky's Double Trouble (Tashlin/Nov 13/GC V5/PP101) - 1937
77. The Woods Are Full of Cuckoos (Tashlin/Dec 4/GC V3) - 1937
78. Porky's Hero Agency (Clampett/Dec 4/PP101 NR) - 1937
79. Daffy Duck & Egghead (Avery/Jan 1/GC V3/EDD/CV V1) - 1938
80. Porky's Poppa (Clampett/Jan 15/GC V5/PP101) - 1938
81. Porky at the Crocadero (Tashlin/Feb 5/GC V5/PP101) - 1938
82. What Price Porky (Clampett/Feb 26/GC V5/PP101) - 1938
83. The Sneezing Weasel (Avery/Mar 12/CC V4) - 1938
84. Porky's Phoney Express (Howard & Dalton/Mar 19/PP101 NR) - 1938
85. A Star is Hatched (Freleng/Apr 2/CV V3) - 1938
86. Porky's Five & Ten (Clampett/Apr 16/PP101 NR) - 1938
87. The Penguin Parade (Avery/Apr 23/CC V2) - 1938
88. Porky's Hare Hunt (Hardaway/April 30/PC V2/PP101) - 1938
89. Now That Summer is Gone (Tashlin/May 14/GC V4) - 1938
90. Injun Trouble (Clampett/May 21/PP101 NR) - 1938
91. Porky the Fireman (Tashlin/Jun 4/GC V4/PP101) - 1938
92. Katnip Kollege (Howard and Dalton/Jun 11/GC V2/PC V1) - 1938
93. Porky's Party (Clampett/Jun 25/GC V3/PP101) - 1938
94. Have You Got Any Castles? (Tashlin/Jun 25/GC V2) - 1938
95. Porky's Spring Planting (Tashlin/Jul 16/PP101 NR) - 1938
96. Cinderella Meets Fella (Avery/Jul 23/CC V3) - 1938
97. Porky & Daffy (Clampett/Aug 6/PP101 NR) - 1938
98. Wholly Smoke (Tashlin/Aug 27/GC V5/PC V3/PP101) - 1938
99. Cracked Ice (Tashlin/Sep 10/GC V4) - 1938
100. A Feud There Was (Avery/Sep 24/CC V3) - 1938
101. Porky in Wackyland (Clampett/Sep 24/GC V2/PC V2/PP101) - 1938
102. Little Pancho Vanilla (Tashlin/Oct 8/GC V4) - 1938
103. Porky's Naughty Nephew (Clampett/Oct 15/PP101 NR) - 1938
104. Porky in Egypt (Clampett/Nov 5/GC V3/PC V2/PP101) - 1938
105. You're an Education (Tashlin/Nov 5/GC V4) - 1938
106. The Night Watchman (Jones/Nov 19/GC V4) - 1938
107. The Daffy Doc (Clampett/Nov 26/GC V5/EDD/PP101) - 1938
108. Daffy Duck in Hollywood (Avery/Dec 3/GC V3) - 1938
109. Porky the Gob (Hardaway & Dalton/Dec 17/PP101 NR) - 1938
110. The Lone Stranger and Porky (Clampett/Jan 7/PP101 NR) - 1939
111. Dog Gone Modern (Jones/Jan 14/CV V3) - 1939
112. It's an Ill Wind (Hardaway & Dalton/Jan 28/PP101 NR) - 1939
113. Hamateur Night (Avery/Jan 28/CC V2) - 1939
114. Robin Hood Makes Good (Jones/Feb 12/CV V1) - 1939
115. Porky's Tire Trouble (Clampett/Feb 18/PP101 NR) - 1939
116. A Day at the Zoo (Avery/Mar 11/CV V1) - 1939
117. Porky's Movie Mystery (Clampett/Mar 11/PP101 NR) - 1939
118. Prest-O Change-O (Jones/Mar 25/PC V2) - 1939
119. Chicken Jitters (Clampett/Apr 1/PP101 NR) - 1939
120. Bars and Stripes Forever (Hardway & Dalton/Apr 8/CV V1) - 1939
121. Daffy Duck and the Dinosaur (Jones/Apr 22/GC V3) - 1939
122. Porky and Teabiscuit (Hardaway & Dalton/Apr 22/GC V3/PP101) - 1939
123. Thugs with Dirty Mugs (Avery/May 6/GC V3) - 1939
124. Kristopher Kolumbus Jr. (Clampett/May 13/PP101 NR) - 1939
125. Naughty but Mice (Jones/May 20/MC) - 1939
126. Polar Pals (Clampett/Jun 3/GC V5/PP101) - 1939
127. Scalp Trouble (Clampett/Jun 24/PP101 NR) - 1939
128. Old Glory (Jones/Jul 1/GC V2/PC V1/PP101) - 1939
129. Porky's Picnic (Clampett/Jul 15/PP101 NR) - 1939
130. Dangerous Dan McFoo (Avery/Jul 15/CC V4) - 1939
131. Wise Quacks (Clampett/Aug 5/GC V5/PP101) - 1939
132. Hare-um Scare-um (Hardaway/Aug 12/PC V2) - 1939
133. Porky's Hotel (Clampett/Sep 2/PP101 NR) - 1939
134. Little Brother Rat (Jones/Sep 2/MC) - 1939
135. Jeepers Creepers (Clampett/Sep 23/PP101 NR) - 1939
136. Naughty Neighbors (Clampett/Oct 7/PP101 NR) - 1939
137. Pied Piper Porky (Clampett/Nov 4/PP101 NR) - 1939
138. Porky the Giant Killer (Hardaway & Dalton/Nov 18/PP101 NR) - 1939
139. Sniffles and the Bookworm (Jones/Dec 2/MC) - 1939
140. The Film Fan (Clampett/Dec 16/GC V3/PP101) - 1939
141. Porky's Last Stand (Clampett/Jan 6/PP101 NR) - 1940
142. Africa Squeaks (Clampett/Jan 27/PP101 NR) - 1940
143. Ali-Baba Bound (Clampett/Feb 10/PP101 NR) - 1940
144. Elmer's Candid Camera (Jones/Mar 2/GC V1/EBB/PC V2/BB80) - 1940
145. Pilgrim Porky (Clampett/Mar 16/GC V5/PP101) - 1940
146. Cross Country Detours (Avery/Mar 16/CC V2) - 1940
147. Slap Happy Pappy (Clampett/Apr 13/PP101 NR) - 1940
148. The Bear's Tale (Avery/Apr 13/GC V5) - 1940
149. Porky's Poor Fish (Clampett/Apr 27/GC V4/PP101) - 1940
150. Sniffles Takes a Trip (Jones/May 11/MC) - 1940
151. You Ought to Be in Pictures (Freleng/May 18/GC V2/PC V2/PP101) - 1940
152. A Gander at Mother Goose (Avery/May 25/GC V5) - 1940
153. The Chewin' Bruin (Clampett/Jun 8/PP101 NR) - 1940
154. Tom Thumb in Trouble (Jones/Jun 8/GC V5) - 1940
155. Porky's Baseball Broadcast (Freleng/Jul 6/PP101 NR) - 1940
156. Little Blabbermouse (Freleng/Jul 6/CV V2) - 1940
157. The Egg Collector (Jones/Jul 20/MC) - 1940
158. A Wild Hare (Avery/Jul 27/EBB/PC V2/BB80) - 1940
159. Ghost Wanted (Jones/Aug 10/CC V2) - 1940
160. Patient Porky (Clampett/Aug 24/GC V5/PP101 NR) - 1940
161. Calling Dr. Porky (Freleng/Sep 21/PP101 NR) - 1940
162. Prehistoric Porky (Clampett/Oct 12/GC V5/PP101) - 1940
163. Good Night Elmer (Jones/Oct 26/CV V1) - 1940
164. The Sour Puss (Clampett/Nov 2/GC V4/PP101) - 1940
165. Bedtime for Sniffles (Jones/Nov 23/MC) - 1940
166. Porky's Hired Hand (Freleng/Nov 30/PP101 NR) - 1940
167. Of Fox and Hounds (Avery/Dec 7/CV V1) - 1940
168. The Timid Toreador (Clampett/Dec 21/PP101 NR) - 1940
169. Elmer's Pet Rabbit (Jones/Jan 4/CC V3) - 1941
170. Porky's Snooze Reel (Clampett/Jan 11/PP101 NR) - 1941
171. Sniffles Bells the Cat (Jones/Feb 1/MC) - 1941
172. Joe Glow, the Firefly (Jones/Mar 8/CV V3) - 1941
173. Tortoise Beats Hare (Avery/Mar 15/GC V2/WW/PC V2) - 1941
174. Porky's Bear Facts (Freleng/Mar 29/PP101 NR) - 1941
175. Goofy Groceries (Clampett/Mar 29/GC V3) - 1941
176. Toy Trouble (Jones/Apr 12/MC) - 1941
177. Porky's Preview (Avery/Apr 19/GC V5/PP101) - 1941
178. The Trial of Mister Wolf (Freleng/Apr 26/GC V5) - 1941
179. Porky's Ant (Jones/May 10/PP101 NR) - 1941
180. Farm Frolics (Clampett/May 10/GC V5) - 1941
181. Hollywood Steps Out (Avery/May 24/GC V2/PC V2) - 1941
182. A Coy Decoy (Clampett/Jun 7/PP101 NR) - 1941
183. Hiawatha's Rabbit Hunt (Freleng/Jun 7/PC V3) - 1941
184. Porky's Prize Pony (Jones/Jun 21/PP101 NR) - 1941
185. The Wacky Worm (Freleng/Jun 21/CC V2) - 1941
186. Meet John Doughboy (Clampett/Jul 5/GC V6/PP101) - 1941
187. The Heckling Hare (Avery/Jul 5/GC V2/CV V2) - 1941
188. We, the Animals Squeak! (Clampett/Aug 9/PP101 NR) - 1941
189. The Henpecked Duck (Clampett/Aug 30/PP101 NR) - 1941
190. Notes to You (Freleng/Sep 20/PP101 NR) - 1941
191. The Brave Little Bat (Jones/Sep 27/MC) - 1941
192. Robinson Crusoe, Jr. (McCabe/Oct 25/PP101 NR) - 1941
193. Rookie Revue (Freleng/Oct 25/GC V6) - 1941
194. Saddle Silly (Jones/Nov 8/CC V3) - 1941
195. Porky's Midnight Matinee (Jones/Nov 22/PP101 NR) - 1941
196. The Cagey Canary (Avery & Clampett/Nov 22/CC V4) - 1941
197. Rhapsody in Rivets (Freleng/Dec 6/PC V3) - 1941
198. Wabbit Twouble (Clampett/Dec 20/GC V1/PC V2) - 1941
199. Porky's Pooch (Clampett/Dec 27/GC V5/PP101) - 1941
200. Hop, Skip and a Chump (Freleng/Jan 3/CC V3) - 1942
201. Porky's Pastry Pirates (Freleng/Jan 17/PP101 NR) - 1942
202. The Bird Came C.O.D. (Jones/Jan 17/CV V2) - 1942
203. Who's Who in the Zoo (McCabe/Feb 14/PP101 NR) - 1942
204. Porky's Cafe (Jones/Feb 21/PP101 NR) - 1942
205. Conrad the Sailor (Jones/Feb 28/GC V4/CV V3) - 1942
206. Crazy Cruise (Avery & Clampett/Mar 14/GC V5) - 1942
207. The Wabbit Who Came to Supper (Freleng/Mar 28/GC V3) - 1942
208. Horton Hatches the Egg (Clampett/Apr 11/GC V6/CV V1) - 1942
209. Daffy's Southern Exposure (McCabe/May 2/CC V2) - 1942
210. The Wacky Wabbit (Clampett/May 2/GC V5) - 1942
211. The Draft Horse (Jones/May 9/GC V6) - 1942
212. Lights Fantastic (Freleng/May 23/GC V6) - 1942
213. Hold the Lion, Please (Jones/Jun 6/BB80) - 1942
214. Double Chaser (Freleng/Jun 27/CC V4) - 1942
215. Bugs Bunny Gets the Boid (Clampett/Jul 11/GC V1/PC V2/BB80) - 1942
216. Wacky Blackout (Clampett/Jul 11/GC V6) - 1942
217. Foney Fables (Freleng/Aug 1/GC V5) - 1942
218. The Ducktators (McCabe/Aug 1/GC V6) - 1942
219. The Squawkin' Hawk (Jones/Aug 8/CV V1) - 1942
220. Eatin' on the Cuff or The Moth Who Came to Dinner (Clampett/Aug 22/GC V5) - 1942
221. The Impatient Patient (McCabe/Sep 5/CC V4) - 1942
222. Fox Pop (Jones/Sep 5/CC V4) - 1942
223. The Dover Boys at Pimento University or The Rivals of Roquefort Hall (Jones/Sep 10/GC V2/PC V1) - 1942
224. The Hep Cat (Clampett/Oct 3/GC V2/PC V3) - 1942
225. The Sheepish Wolf (Freleng/Oct 17/CC V3) - 1942
226. The Daffy Duckaroo (McCabe/Oct 24/CV V2) - 1942
227. The Hare-Brained Hypnotist (Freleng/Oct 31/GC V2) - 1942
228. A Tale of Two Kitties (Clampett/Nov 21/GC V5/PC V1) - 1942
229. My Favorite Duck (Jones/Dec 5/GC V6/CV V3) - 1942
230. Ding Dog Daddy (Freleng/Dec 5/CC V2) - 1942
231. Case of the Missing Hare (Jones/Dec 12/GC V3/CV V3) - 1942
232. Confusions of a Nutzy Spy (McCabe/Jan 23/PP101 NR) - 1943
233. Pigs in a Polka (Freleng/Feb 2/GC V3/PC V3) - 1943
234. Tortoise Wins by a Hare (Clampett/Feb 20/GC V1/PC V2) - 1943
235. The Fifth-Column Mouse (Freleng/Mar 6/GC V6) - 1943
236. To Duck or Not to Duck (Jones/Mar 6/GC V6) - 1943
237. Hop and Go (McCabe/Mar 27/CV V2) - 1943
238. Super-Rabbit (Jones/Apr 3/GC V3/WW/BB80) - 1943
239. The Unbearable Bear (Jones/Apr 17/MC) - 1943
240. The Wise Quacking Duck (Clampett/May 1/GC V5/PC V2) - 1943
241. Greetings Bait (Freleng/May 15/CC V2) - 1943
242. Jack-Wabbit and the Beanstalk (Freleng/Jun 12/BB80) - 1943
243. The Aristo-Cat (Jones/Jun 19/GC V4/MC) - 1943
244. Yankee Doodle Daffy (Freleng/Jul 3/GC V1) - 1943
245. Wackiki Wabbit (Jones/Jul 3/GC V3) - 1943
246. Porky Pig's Feat (Tashlin/Jul 17/GC V3/PC V3/PP101) - 1943
247. Scrap Happy Daffy (Tashlin/Aug 21/GC V5/PC V3) - 1943
248. Hiss and Make Up (Freleng/Sep 11/CC V2) - 1943
249. A Corny Concerto (Clampett/Sep 25/GC V2/PC V3) - 1943
250. Fin'n Catty (Jones/Oct 23/CC V2) - 1943
251. Falling Hare (Clampett/Oct 30/GC V3/PC V3) - 1943
252. Daffy - The Commando (Freleng/Nov 20/GC V6/CV V3) - 1943
253. An Itch in Time (Clampett/Dec 4/GC V3/PC V2) - 1943
254. Puss n' Booty (Tashlin/Dec 11/GC V4/CV V3) - 1943
255. Little Red Riding Rabbit (Freleng/Jan 4/GC V2/PC V3) - 1944
256. What's Cookin' Doc? (Clampett/Jan 8/BB80) - 1944
257. Meatless Flyday (Freleng/Jan 29/CC V4) - 1944
258. Tom Turk and Daffy (Jones/Feb 12/PP/CV V1) - 1944
259. Bugs Bunny and the Three Bears (Jones/Feb 26/GC V1/BB80) - 1944
260. I Got Plenty of Mutton (Tashlin/Mar 11/GC V4/CV V3) - 1944
261. The Weakly Reporter (Jones/Mar 25/GC V6) - 1944
262. Tick Tock Tuckered (Clampett/Apr 8/DD) - 1944
263. Swooner Crooner (Tashlin/May 6/GC V3/PC V3) - 1944
264. Russian Rhapsody (Clampett/May 20/GC V6/PC V2) - 1944
265. Duck Soup to Nuts (Freleng/May 27/GC V2/CV V3) - 1944
266. Slightly Daffy (Freleng/Jun 17/CV V3) - 1944
267. Hare Ribbin' (Clampett/Jun 24/GC V5/BB80) - 1944
268. Brother Brat (Tashlin/Jul 15/CC V2) - 1944
269. Hare Force (Freleng/Jul 22/GC V3) - 1944
270. From Hand to Mouse (Jones/Aug 5/CC V2) - 1944
271. Birdy and the Beast (Clampett/Aug 19/PC V2) - 1944
272. Buckaroo Bugs (Clampett/Aug 26/GC V5/PC V2) - 1944
273. Plane Daffy (Tashlin/Sep 16/GC V4/EDD/PC V3) - 1944
274. Lost and Foundling (Jones/Sep 30/MC) - 1944
275. Booby Hatched (Tashlin/Oct 14/GC V4/CV V3) - 1944
276. The Old Grey Hare (Clampett/Oct 28/GC V5/EBB/PC V1/BB80) - 1944
277. The Stupid Cupid (Tashlin/Nov 25/GC V4/PC V3) - 1944
278. Stage Door Cartoon (Freleng/Dec 30/GC V2/CV V3) - 1944
279. Odor-able Kitty (Jones/Jan 6/GC V3/PLP/CV V1) - 1945
280. Herr Meets Hare (Freleng/Jan 13/GC V6/CV V3) - 1945
281. Draftee Daffy (Clampett/Jan 27/GC V3/PC V3) - 1945
282. The Unruly Hare (Tashlin/Feb 10/CC V1) - 1945
283. Trap Happy Porky (Jones/Feb 24/MC) - 1945
284. Life with Feathers (Freleng/Mar 24/PC V3) - 1945
285. Behind the Meat-Ball (Tashlin/Apr 7/CC V2) - 1945
286. Hare Trigger (Freleng/May 5/GC V6/CV V1) - 1945
287. Ain't That Ducky (Freleng/May 19/CV V2) - 1945
288. A Gruesome Twosome (Clampett/Jun 9/GC V3/PC V3) - 1945
289. Tale of Two Mice (Tashlin/Jun 30/CC V1) - 1945
290. Wagon Heels (Clampett/Jul 28/GC V5/PP/CV V2) - 1945
291. Hare Conditioned (Jones/Aug 11/GC V2/CV V1) - 1945
292. Fresh Airedale (Jones/Aug 25/GC V6/CV V3) - 1945
293. The Bashful Buzzard (Clampett/Sep 5/GC V5/PC V2) - 1945
294. Peck Up Your Troubles (Freleng/Oct 20/CC V4) - 1945
295. Hare Tonic (Jones/Nov 10/GC V3/PC V1) - 1945
296. Nasty Quacks (Tashlin/Dec 1/DD/EDD/PC V3) - 1945
297. Book Revue (Clampett/Jan 5/GC V2/EDD/PC V2) - 1946
298. Baseball Bugs (Freleng/Feb 2/GC V1/EBB/PC V1/BB80) - 1946
299. Holiday for Shoestrings (Freleng/Feb 23/GC V5/CV V3) - 1946
300. Quentin Quail (Jones/Mar 2/CC V3) - 1946
301. Baby Bottleneck (Clampett/Mar 16/GC V2/PC V1) - 1946
302. Hare Remover (Tashlin/Mar 23/GC V3/CV V2) - 1946
303. Daffy Doodles (McKimson/Apr 6/CC V1) - 1946
304. Hollywood Canine Canteen (McKimson/Apr 20/GC V6) - 1946
305. Hush My Mouse (Jones/May 4/MC) - 1946
306. Hair-Raising Hare (Jones/May 25/GC V1/EBB/PC V3/BB80) - 1946
307. Kitty Kornered (Clampett/Jun 8/GC V2/PC V1) - 1946
308. Hollywood Daffy (Freleng/Jun 22/GC V5/CV V3) - 1946
309. Acrobatty Bunny (McKimson/Jun 29/GC V3/PC V3) - 1946
310. The Eager Beaver (Jones/Jul 13/CC V2) - 1946
311. The Great Piggy Bank Robbery (Clampett/Jul 20/GC V2/EDD/PC V1) - 1946
312. Bacall to Arms (Clampett & Davis/Aug 3/GC V5) - 1946
313. Of Thee I Sting (Freleng/Aug 17/CV V3) - 1946
314. Walky Talky Hawky (McKimson/Aug 31/GC V3/PC V3) - 1946
315. Racketeer Rabbit (Freleng/Sep 14/BB80) - 1946
316. Fair and Worm-er (Jones/Sep 28/CC V2) - 1946
317. The Big Snooze (Clampett/Oct 5/GC V2/PC V3/PC V3) - 1946
318. The Mouse-Merized Cat (McKimson/Oct 19/CC V4) - 1946
319. Mouse Menace (Davis/Nov 2/PP/CV V2) - 1946
320. Rhapsody Rabbit (Freleng/Nov 9/GC V2/GC V4/CV V1) - 1946
321. Roughly Squeaking (Jones/Nov 23/MC) - 1946
322. One Meat Brawl (McKimson/Jan 18/PP NR/CC V2) - 1947
323. The Goofy Gophers (Davis/Jan 25/CV V1) - 1947
324. The Gay Anties (Freleng/Jan 25//CV V3) - 1947
325. Scent-imental Over You (Jones/Mar 8/PLP/CV V2) - 1947
326. A Hare Grows in Manhattan (Freleng/Mar 23/GC V3/PC V3) - 1947
327. Birth of a Notion (McKimson/Apr 12/GC V6/CV V1) - 1947
328. Tweetie Pie (Freleng/May 3/GC V2/PC V1/FF) - 1947
329. Rabbit Transit (Freleng/May 10/GC V2/PC V2) - 1947
330. Hobo Bobo (McKimson/May 17/CC V3) - 1947
331. Along Came Daffy (Freleng/Jun 14/CC V4) - 1947
332. Easter Yeggs (McKimson/Jun 28/GC V3/PC V3) - 1947
333. Crowing Pains (McKimson/Jul 12/GC V6/CV V2) - 1947
334. A Pest in the House (Jones/Aug 3/GC V5/PC V1) - 1947
335. The Foxy Duckling (Davis/Aug 23/CC V1) - 1947
336. House Hunting Mice (Jones/Sep 6/MC) - 1947
337. Little Orphan Airedale (Jones/Oct 4/CC V1) - 1947
338. Doggone Cats (Davis/Oct 25/CC V1) - 1947
339. Slick Hare (Freleng/Nov 1/GC V2/PC V3) - 1947
340. Mexican Joyride (Davis/Nov 29/CC V3) - 1947
341. Catch as Cats Can (Davis/Dec 6/CC V1) - 1947
342. A Horse Fly Fleas (McKimson/Dec 13/PC V2) - 1947
343. Gorilla My Dreams (McKimson/Jan 3/GC V2/WW/PC V3) - 1948
344. Two Gophers from Texas (Davis/Jan 17/CC V1) - 1948
345. A Feather in His Hare (Jones/Feb 7/CV V3) - 1948
346. What Makes Daffy Duck (Davis/Feb 14/PC V2) - 1948
347. What's Brewin', Bruin? (Jones/Feb 28/CC V1) - 1948
348. Daffy Duck Slept Here (McKimson/Mar 6/GC V3) - 1948
349. A Hick, a Slick, and a Chick (Davis/Mar 13/CC V2) - 1948
350. Back Alley Oproar (Freleng/Mar 27/GC V2/PC V2) - 1948
351. I Taw a Putty Tat (Freleng/Apr 2/CV V2) - 1948
352. Rabbit Punch (Jones/Apr 10/GC V3/CV V1) - 1948
353. Hop, Look and Listen (McKimson/Apr 17/MM) - 1948
354. Nothing But the Tooth (Davis/May 1/CV V3) - 1948
355. Buccaneer Bunny (Freleng/May 8/GC V5/PC V1) - 1948
356. Bone Sweet Bone (Davis/May 22/CV V2) - 1948
357. Bugs Bunny Rides Again (Freleng/Jun 12/GC V2/BB80) - 1948
358. The Rattled Rooster (Davis/Jun 26/CV V2) - 1948
359. The Up-Standing Sitter (McKimson/Jul 3/GC V5) - 1948
360. Haredevil Hare (Jones/Jul 24/GC V1/PC V1/BB80) - 1948
361. You Were Never Duckier (Jones/Aug 7/GC V5/CV V2) - 1948
362. Dough Ray Me-ow (Davis/Aug 14/GC V4/PC V2) - 1948
363. Hot Cross Bunny (McKimson/Aug 21/BB80) - 1948
364. The Pest That Came to Dinner (Davis/Sep 11/PP/CV V2) - 1948
365. Hare Splitter (Freleng/Sep 25/BB80) - 1948
366. Odor of the Day (Davis/Oct 2/PLP/CV V2) - 1948
367. The Foghorn Leghorn (McKimson/Oct 9/GC V1/PC V2) - 1948
368. A-Lad-In His Lamp (McKimson/Oct 23/CV V2) - 1948
369. Daffy Dilly (Jones/Oct 30/DD/CV V1) - 1948
370. Kit for Cat (Freleng/Nov 6/GC V1) - 1948
371. The Stupor Salesman (Davis/Nov 20/GC V5/PC V3) - 1948
372. Riff Raffy Daffy (Davis/Nov 27/PP NR/CC V3) - 1948
373. My Bunny Lies over the Sea (Jones/Dec 4/GC V1) - 1948
374. Scaredy Cat (Jones/Dec 18/GC V1/PC V1) - 1948
375. Wise Quackers (Freleng/Jan 1/DD/CV V2) - 1949
376. Hare Do (Freleng/Jan 15/GC V3) - 1949
377. Holiday for Drumsticks (Davis/Jan 22/CC V4) - 1949
378. Awful Orphan (Jones/Jan 29/GC V1/CV V2) - 1949
379. Porky Chops (Davis/Feb 12/GC V1/PC V1) - 1949
380. Mississippi Hare (Jones/Feb 26/GC V4/CV V3) - 1949
381. Paying the Piper (McKimson/Mar 12/GC V5) - 1949
382. Daffy Duck Hunt (McKimson/Mar 26/GC V1) - 1949
383. Rebel Rabbit (McKimson/Apr 9/GC V3) - 1949
384. Mouse Wreckers (Jones/Apr 23/GC V2/MC) - 1949
385. High Diving Hare (Freleng/Apr 30/GC V1/WW/PC V3) - 1949
386. The Bee-Deviled Bruin (Jones/May 14/CC V1) - 1949
387. Curtain Razor (Freleng/May 21/PP) - 1949
388. Bowery Bugs (Davis/Jun 4/GC V3/WW/CV V2) - 1949
389. Long-Haired Hare (Jones/Jun 25/GC V1/WW/PC V2) - 1949
390. Henhouse Henery (McKimson/Jul 2/CC V4) - 1949
391. Knights Must Fall (Freleng/Jul 16/BB80) - 1949
392. Bad Ol' Putty Tat (Freleng/Jul 23/GC V2/FF) - 1949
393. The Grey Hounded Hare (McKimson/Aug 6/GC V4) - 1949
394. Often an Orphan (Jones/Aug 13/GC V6/CV V2) - 1949
395. The Windblown Hare (McKimson/Aug 27/GC V3/CV V3) - 1949
396. Dough for the Do-Do (Freleng/Sep 2/GC V1) - 1949
397. Fast and Furry-ous (Jones/Sep 16/GC V1/PC V1) - 1949
398. Each Dawn I Crow (Freleng/Sep 24/CV V1) - 1949
399. Frigid Hare (Jones/Oct 7/GC V1/CV V2) - 1949
400. Swallow the Leader (McKimson/Oct 14/GC V4) - 1949
401. Bye, Bye Bluebeard (Davis/Oct 21/GC V3/CV V1) - 1949
402. For Scent-imental Reasons (Jones/Nov 12/GC V1/PC V1/PLP) - 1949
403. Hippety Hopper (McKimson/Nov 19/GC V6s/MM) - 1949
404. Bear Feat (Jones/Dec 10/GC V6) - 1949
405. Rabbit Hood (Jones/Dec 24/GC V4/PC V1) - 1949
406. A Ham in a Role (McKimson/Dec 31/GC V6/PC V3) - 1949
407. Home Tweet Home (Freleng/Jan 14/PC V2) - 1950
408. Hurdy-Gurdy Hare (McKimson/Jan 21/GC V4) - 1950
409. Boobs in the Woods (McKimson/Jan 28/GC V1/PP/CV V3) - 1950
410. Mutiny on the Bunny (Freleng/Feb 11/BB/CV V3) - 1950
411. The Lion's Busy (Freleng/Feb 18/PC V2) - 1950
412. The Scarlet Pumpernickel (Jones/Mar 4/GC V1/EDD/PC V1) - 1950
413. Homeless Hare (Jones/Mar 11/GC V3) - 1950
414. Strife with Father (McKimson/Apr 1/PC V2) - 1950
415. The Hypo-Chondri-Cat (Jones/Apr 15/GC V1/MC) - 1950
416. Big House Bunny (Freleng/Apr 22/GC V1) - 1950
417. The Leghorn Blows at Midnight (McKimson/May 6/CC V1) - 1950
418. His Bitter Half (Freleng/May 20/ CC V1) - 1950
419. An Egg Scramble (McKimson/May 27/GC V3) - 1950
420. What's Up Doc? (McKimson/Jun 17/GC V1/BB80) - 1950
421. All Abir-r-r-d! (Freleng/Jun 24/GC V2/FF) - 1950
422. 8 Ball Bunny (Jones/Jul 8/GC V4/EBB/PC V1/BB80) - 1950
423. It's Hummer Time (McKimson/Jul 22/GC V6) - 1950
424. Golden Yeggs (Freleng/Aug 5/GC V1) - 1950
425. Hillbilly Hare (McKimson/Aug 12/GC V3/PC V3) - 1950
426. Dog Gone South (Jones/Aug 26/GC V6/PC V3) - 1950
427. The Ducksters (Jones/Sep 2/GC V1) - 1950
428. A Fractured Leghorn (McKimson/Spe 16/CC V1) - 1950
429. Bunker Hill Bunny (Freleng/Sep 23/GC V1) - 1950
430. Canary Row (Freleng/Oct 7/GC V1/FF/PC V3) - 1950
431. Stooge for a Mouse (Freleng/Oct 21/CC V1) - 1950
432. Pop 'im Pop! (McKimson/Oct 28/MM) - 1950
433. Bushy Hare (McKimson/Nov 18/BB) - 1950
434. Dog Collared (McKimson/Dec 2/PP) - 1950
435. Rabbit of Seville (Jones/Dec 16/GC V1/WW/EBB/PC V1/BB80) - 1950
436. Two's a Crowd (Jones/Dec 30/CV V1) - 1950
437. Hare We Go (McKimson/Jan 6/BB) - 1951
438. A Fox in a Fix (McKimson/Jan 20/CV V1) - 1951
439. Canned Feud (Freleng/Feb 3/GC V1/PC V2) - 1951
440. Rabbit Every Monday (Freleng/Feb 10/BB80) - 1951
441. Putty Tat Trouble (Freleng/Feb 24/GC V1/FF) - 1951
442. Corn Plastered (McKimson/Mar 3/PP) - 1951
443. Bunny Hugged (Jones/Mar 10/GC V2/PC V3) - 1951
444. Scent-imental Romeo (Jones/Mar 24/PLP/PC V2) - 1951
445. A Bone for a Bone (Freleng/Apr 7/CC V4) - 1951
446. The Fair-Haired Hare (Freleng/Apr 14/BB80) - 1951
447. A Hound for Trouble (Jones/Apr 28/CC V2) - 1951
448. Early to Bet (McKimson/May 12/GC V1) - 1951
449. Rabbit Fire (Jones/May 19/GC V1/WW/EBB/PC V2/BB80) - 1951
450. Room and Bird (Freleng/Jun 2/GC V2/FF) - 1951
451. Chow Hound (Jones/Jun 16/GC V6/PC V1) - 1951
452. French Rarebit (McKimson/Jun 30/GC V2) - 1951
453. The Wearing of the Grin (Jones/Jul 28/GC V1) - 1951
454. Leghorn Swoggled (McKimson/Jul 28/CC V4) - 1951
455. His Hare-Raising Tale (Freleng/Aug 11/BB80) - 1951
456. Cheese Chasers (Jones/Aug 28/GC V2/MC) - 1951
457. Lovelorn Leghorn (McKimson/Sep 8/PC V1) - 1951
458. Tweety's S.O.S. (Freleng/Sep 22/GC V1/FF) - 1951
459. Ballot Box Bunny (Freleng/Oct 6/GC V1/WW/CV V3) - 1951
460. A Bear for Punishment (Jones/Oct 20/GC V2/PC V3) - 1951
461. Sleepy Time Possum (McKimson/Nov 3/CV V3) - 1951
462. Drip-Along Daffy (Jones/Nov 17/GC V1/PC V2) - 1951
463. Big Top Bunny (McKimson/Dec 12/GC V1/WW) - 1951
464. Tweet Tweet Tweety (Freleng/Dec 15/GC V2/FF) - 1951
465. The Prize Pest (McKimson/Dec 22/DD) - 1951
466. Who's Kitten Who? (McKimson/Jan 5/MM) - 1952
467. Operation: Rabbit (Jones/Jan 19/GC V4/PC V3) - 1952
468. Feed the Kitty (Jones/Feb 2/GC V1/PC V1) - 1952
469. Gift Wrapped (Freleng/Feb 16/GC V2/FF/PC V2) - 1952
470. Foxy by Proxy (Freleng/Feb 23/BB/CV V3) - 1952
471. Thumb Fun (McKimson/Mar 1/PP) - 1952
472. 14 Carrot Rabbit (Freleng/Feb 16/GC V5) - 1952
473. Little Beau Pepé (Jones/Mar 29/PLP) - 1952
474. Kiddin' The Kitten (McKimson/Apr 5/GC V4) - 1952
475. Water, Water Every Hare (Jones/Apr 19/GC V1) - 1952
476. Little Red Rodent Hood (Freleng/May 3/GC V5/PC V2) - 1952
477. Sock a Doodle Do (McKimson/May 10/CV V2) - 1952
478. Beep, Beep (Jones/May 24/GC V2/PC V1) - 1952
479. The Hasty Hare (Jones/Jun 7/PC V1) - 1952
480. Ain't She Tweet (Freleng/Jun 21/GC V2/FF/CV V1) - 1952
481. The Turn-Tale Wolf (McKimson/Jun 28/GC V5) - 1952
482. Cracked Quack (Freleng/Jul 5/CC V1) - 1952
483. Oily Hare (McKimson/Jul 26/GC V5) - 1952
484. Hoppy-Go-Lucky (McKimson/Aug 9/MM) - 1952
485. Going! Going! Gosh! (Jones/Aug 23/GC V2/PC V2) - 1952
486. A Bird in a Guilty Cage (Freleng/Aug 30/GC V2/CV V2) - 1952
487. Mouse-Warming (Jones/Sep 8/CC V4) - 1952
488. Rabbit Seasoning (Jones/Sep 20/GC V1/WW/PC V2) - 1952
489. The EGGcited Rooster (McKimson/Oct 4/CV V2) - 1952
490. Tree for Two (Freleng/Oct 18/PC V3) - 1952
491. The Super Snooper (McKimson/Nov 11/GC V5) - 1952
492. Rabbit's Kin (McKimson/Nov 15/GC V1/WW/CV V3) - 1952
493. Terrier Stricken (Jones/Nov 29/CV V1) - 1952
494. Fool Coverage (McKimson/Dec 13/PP) - 1952
495. Hare Lift (Freleng/Dec 20/BB80) - 1952
496. Don't Give Up the Sheep (Jones/Jan 3/GC V1) - 1953
497. Snow Business (Freleng/Jan 17/GC V2/FF/CV V1) - 1953
498. A Mouse Divided (Freleng/Jan 31/CC V1) - 1953
499. Forward March Hare (Jones/Feb 4/GC V4) - 1953
500. Kiss Me Cat (Jones/Feb 21/GC V4/PC V1) - 1953
501. Duck Amuck (Jones/Feb 28/GC V1/EDD/PC V1) - 1953
502. Upswept Hare (McKimson/Mar 14/BB80) - 1953
503. A Peck o' Trouble (McKimson/Mar 28/GC V4) - 1953
504. Fowl Weather (Freleng/Apr 8/CV V2) - 1953
505. Muscle Tussle (Freleng/Apr 18/CC V4) - 1953
506. Southern Fried Rabbit (Freleng/May 2/GC V4) - 1953
507. Ant Pasted (Freleng/May 9/PP) - 1953
508. Much Ado About Nutting (Jones/May 23/GC V6/CV V1) - 1953
509. There Auto Be a Law (McKimson/Jun 6/CC V3) - 1953
510. Hare Trimmed (Freleng/Jun 20/BB/CV V1) - 1953
511. Wild Over You (Jones/Jul 11/PLP) - 1953
512. Duck Dodgers in the 24½th Century (Jones/Jul 25/GC V2/EDD/PC V1) - 1953
513. Bully for Bugs (Jones/Aug 8/GC V1/WW/PC V3) - 1953
514. Plop Goes the Weasel (McKimson/Aug 22/CC V1) - 1953
515. Cat-Tails for Two (McKimson/Aug 29/GC V4/CV V1) - 1953
516. A Street Cat Named Sylvester (Freleng/Sep 5/CV V2) - 1953
517. Zipping Along (Jones/Sep 19/GC V2/PC V2) - 1953
518. Lumber Jack-Rabbit (Jones/Sep 26/BBcw/BB80) - 1953
519. Duck! Rabbit, Duck! (Jones/Oct 3/GC V3/PC V2) - 1953
520. Easy Peckin's (McKimson/Oct 17/CV V1) - 1953
521. Catty Cornered (Freleng/Oct 31/CC V2) - 1953
522. Of Rice and Hen (McKimson/Nov 14/CC V3) - 1953
523. Cat's A-Weigh (McKimson/Nov 28/MM) - 1953
524. Robot Rabbit (Freleng/Dec 12/BB80) - 1953
525. Punch Trunk (Jones/Dec 19/CC V3) - 1953
526. Dog Pounded (Freleng/Jan 2/PLP/PC V3) - 1954
527. Captain Hareblower (Freleng/Jan 16/BB80) - 1954
528. I Gopher You (Freleng/Jan 30/CV V2) - 1954
529. Feline Frame-Up (Jones/Feb 13/PC V1) - 1954
530. Wild Wife (McKimson/Feb 20/GC V6) - 1954
531. No Barking (Jones/Feb 27/GC V3) - 1954
532. Bugs and Thugs (Freleng/Mar 2/GC V1/PC V3) - 1954
533. The Cat's Bah (Jones/Mar 20/PLP) - 1954
534. Design for Leaving (McKimson/Mar 27/DDcw) - 1954
535. Bell Hoppy (McKimson/Apr 17/MM) - 1954
536. No Parking Hare (McKimson/May 1/BB80) - 1954
537. Dr. Jerkyl's Hide (Freleng/May 8/CV V2) - 1954
538. Claws for Alarm (Jones/May 22/GC V3/CV V2) - 1954
539. Little Boy Boo (McKimson/Jun 5/FL/CV V1) - 1954
540. Devil May Hare (McKimson/Jun 19/GC V1/PC V1) - 1954
541. Muzzle Tough (Freleng/Jun 26/CC V4) - 1954
542. The Oily American (McKimson/Jul 10/GC V6) - 1954
543. Bewitched Bunny (Jones/Jul 24/GC V5/PC V1) - 1954
544. Satan's Waitin' (Freleng/Aug 7/GC V6/FF/PC V3) - 1954
545. Stop! Look! And Hasten! (Jones/Aug 14/GC V2/CV V2) - 1954
546. Yankee Doodle Bugs (Freleng/Aug 28/BB80) - 1954
547. Gone Batty (McKimson/Sep 4/PP) - 1954
548. Goo Goo Goliath (Freleng/Sep 18/GC V6) - 1954
549. By Word of Mouse (Freleng/Oct 2/GC V6) - 1954
550. From A to Z-Z-Z-Z (Jones/Oct 16/PC V1) - 1954
551. Quack Shot (McKimson/Oct 30/CC V4) - 1954
552. My Little Duckaroo (Jones/Nov 27/GC V6/EDD/PC V2) - 1954
553. Sheep Ahoy (Jones/Dec 11/CC V3) - 1954
554. Baby Buggy Bunny (Jones/Dec 18/GC V2/BB80) - 1954
555. Pizzicato Pussycat (Freleng/Jan 1/GC V4/CV V3) - 1955
556. Feather Dusted (McKimson/Jan 15/CV V1) - 1955
557. Pests for Guests (Freleng/Jan 29/CV V2) - 1955
558. Beanstalk Bunny (Jones/Feb 12/CC V1) - 1955
559. All Fowled Up (McKimson/Feb 19/FL) - 1955
560. Stork Naked (Freleng/Feb 26/DDcw/CC V4) - 1955
561. Lighthouse Mouse (McKimson/Mar 12/MM) - 1955
562. Sahara Hare (Freleng/Mar 26/GC V4) - 1955
563. Sandy Claws (Freleng/Apr 2/PC V3) - 1955
564. The Hole Idea (McKimson/Apr 16/GC V6) - 1955
565. Ready, Set, Zoom! (Jones/Apr 30/GC V2/CV V2) - 1955
566. Hare Brush (Freleng/May 7/BB80) - 1955
567. Past Perfumance (Jones/May 21/PLP/CV V1) - 1955
568. Tweety's Circus (Freleng/Jun 4/CV V1) - 1955
569. Rabbit Rampage (Jones/Jun 11/GC V6s/CC V2) - 1955
570. Lumber Jerks (Freleng/Jun 25/GC V1) - 1955
571. This Is a Life? (Freleng/Jul 9/DDcw/BB80) - 1955
572. Double or Mutton (Jones/Jul 23/CC V4/CV V1) - 1955
573. Jumpin' Jupiter (Jones/Aug 6/GC V6/CV V2) - 1955
574. A Kiddies Kitty (Freleng/Aug 20/CV V1) - 1955
575. Hyde and Hare (Freleng/Aug 27/GC V2/CV V2) - 1955
576. Dime to Retire (McKimson/Sep 3/DDcw) - 1955
577. Speedy Gonzales (Freleng/Sep 17/GC V1/PC V1) - 1955
578. Knight-mare Hare (Jones/Oct 1/GC V4) - 1955
579. Two Scent's Worth (Jones/Oct 15/PLP) - 1955
580. Red Riding Hoodwinked (Freleng/Oct 29/GC V5/CV V1) - 1955
581. Roman Legion-Hare (Freleng/Nov 12/GC V4) - 1955
582. Heir-Conditioned (Freleng/Nov 26/GC V6) - 1955
583. Guided Muscle (Jones/Dec 10/GC V2/PC V3) - 1955
584. One Froggy Evening (Jones/Dec 31/GC V2/PC V1) - 1955
585. Bugs' Bonnets (Jones/Jan 14/GC V5) - 1956
586. Too Hop to Handle (McKimson/Jan 28/MM) - 1956
587. Weasel Stop (McKimson/Jan 28/FL) - 1956
588. The High and the Flighty (McKimson/Feb 18/PC V2) - 1956
589. Broom-Stick Bunny (Jones/Feb 25/GC V2/PC V1/WW) - 1956
590. Rocket Squad (Jones/Mar 10/GC V3) - 1956
591. Tweet and Sour (Freleng/Mar 24/CV V3) - 1956
592. Heaven Scent (Jones/Mar 31/GC V6/PLP) - 1956
593. Rabbitson Crusoe (Freleng/Apr 28/BB80) - 1956
594. Gee Whiz-z-z-z-z-z-z (Jones/May 5/GC V2/CV V1) - 1956
595. Tree Cornered Tweety (Freleng/May 19/CV V3) - 1956
596. The Unexpected Pest (McKimson/Jun 2/GC V4) - 1956
597. Napoleon Bunny-Part (Freleng/Jun 16/BBcw/BB80) - 1956
598. Tugboat Granny (Freleng/Jun 23/CC V3) - 1956
599. Stupor Duck (McKimson/Jul 17/GC V5) - 1956
600. Barbary Coast Bunny (Jones/Jul 21/GC V4/PC V2) - 1956
601. Rocket-Bye Baby (Jones/Aug 4/GC V6/PC V2) - 1956
602. Half-Fare Hare (McKimson/Aug 25/BB80) - 1956
603. Raw! Raw! Rooster! (McKimson/Aug 25/GC V6) - 1956
604. The Slap-Hoppy Mouse (McKimson/Sep 1/MM) - 1956
605. A Star Is Bored (Freleng/Sep 15/GC V5/EDD/CV V3) - 1956
606. Deduce, You Say! (Jones/Sep 29/GC V1/EDD/PC V2) - 1956
607. Yankee Dood It (Freleng/Oct 13/GC V6) - 1956
608. Wideo Wabbit (McKimson/Oct 27/GC V3) - 1956
609. There They Go-Go-Go! (Jones/Nov 10/GC V2) - 1956
610. Two Crows from Tacos (Freleng/Nov 24/FL/CV V1) - 1956
611. The Honey-Mousers (McKimson/Dec 8/GC V3) - 1956
612. To Hare Is Human (Jones/Dec 15/GC V4) - 1956
613. Three Little Bops (Freleng/Jan 5/GC V2/PC V1) - 1957
614. Scrambled Aches (Jones/Jan 26/GC V2) - 1957
615. Ali Baba Bunny (Jones/Feb 9/GC V5/EDD/PC V2) - 1957
616. Go Fly a Kit (Jones/Feb 23/GC V4) - 1957
617. Tweety and the Beanstalk (Freleng/May 16/GC V5/FF) - 1957
618. Bedevilled Rabbit (McKimson/Apr 13/BBcw/PC V1) - 1957
619. Boyhood Daze (Jones/Apr 20/PC V1) - 1957
620. Cheese It, the Cat! (McKimson/May 4/FL) - 1957
621. Fox-Terror (McKimson/May 11/FL/CV V3) - 1957
622. Piker's Peak (Freleng/May 25/BB80) - 1957
623. Steal Wool (Jones/Jun 8/GC V3/PC V3) - 1957
624. Boston Quackie (McKimson/Jun 22/CV V2) - 1957
625. What's Opera, Doc? (Jones/Jul 6/GC V2/EBB/PC V1/BB80) - 1957
626. Tabasco Road (McKimson/Jul 20/GC V4/PC V2) - 1957
627. Birds Anonymous (Freleng/Aug 10/GC V3/FF/PC V3) - 1957
628. Ducking the Devil (McKimson/Aug 17/DDcw/PC V1) - 1957
629. Bugsy and Mugsy (Freleng/Aug 31/BB80) - 1957
630. Zoom and Bored (Jones/Sep 14/GC V2/CV V1) - 1957
631. Greedy for Tweety (Freleng/Sep 27/CC V1) - 1957
632. Touché and Go (Jones/Oct 12/PLP) - 1957
633. Show Biz Bugs (Freleng/Nov 2/GC V2/EBB/PC V2/BB80) - 1957
634. Mouse-Taken Identity (McKimson/Nov 16/MM) - 1957
635. Gonzales' Tamales (Freleng/Nov 30/GC V3/CV V1) - 1957
636. Rabbit Romeo (McKimson/Dec 14/GC V4) - 1957
637. Don't Axe Me (McKimson/Jan 4/CV V3) - 1958
638. Tortilla Flaps (McKimson/Jan 18/GC V4) - 1958
639. Hare-Less Wolf (Freleng/Feb 1/BB80) - 1958
640. A Pizza Tweety-Pie (Freleng/Feb 22/CV V3) - 1958
641. Robin Hood Daffy (Jones/Mar 8/GC V3/EDD/PC V1) - 1958
642. Hare-Way to the Stars (Jones/Mar 29/PC V1) - 1958
643. Whoa, Be-Gone! (Jones/Apr 12/GC V2/CV V2) - 1958
644. A Waggily Tale (Freleng/Apr 26/CV V2) - 1958
645. Feather Bluster (McKimson/May 10/CV V3) - 1958
646. Now Hare This (McKimson/May 31/BB80) - 1958
647. To Itch His Own (Jones/Jun 28/CV V2) - 1958
648. Knighty Knight Bugs (Freleng/Aug 23/GC V4/EBB/PC V3/BB80) - 1958
649. Weasel While You Work (McKimson/Sept 6/FL) - 1958
650. Hook, Line and Stinker (Jones/Oct 11/GC V6) - 1958
651. Pre-Hysterical Hare (McKimson/Nov 1/CC V3) - 1958
652. Gopher Broke (McKimson/Nov 15/FL) - 1958
653. Hip Hip-Hurry! (Jones/Dec 6/CC V1) - 1958
654. Cat Feud (Jones/Dec 20/GC V4) - 1958
655. Baton Bunny (Jones and Levitow/Jan 10/GC V1/WW) - 1959
656. Mouse-Placed Kitten (McKimson/Jan 24/FL) - 1959
657. China Jones (McKimson/Feb 14/CC V3) - 1959
658. Hare-Abian Nights (Harris/Feb 28/BB80) - 1959
659. Trick or Tweet (Freleng/Mar 21/CV V3) - 1959
660. The Mouse That Jack Built (McKimson/Apr 4/GC V3) - 1959
661. Apes of Wrath (Freleng/Apr 18/BBcw) - 1959
662. Hot-Rod and Reel! (Jones/May 9/CC V1) - 1959
663. A Mutt in a Rut (McKimson/May 23/FL) - 1959
664. Backwoods Bunny (McKimson/Jun 13/BB80) - 1959
665. Really Scent (Levitow/Jun 27/PLP/CV V3) - 1959
666. Mexicali Shmoes (Freleng/Jul 4/GC V4/PC V2) - 1959
667. Tweet and Lovely (Freleng/Jul 18/CV V1) - 1959
668. Wild and Woolly Hare (Freleng/Aug 1/BB80) - 1959
669. Cat's Paw (McKimson/Aug 15/MM) - 1959
670. Here Today, Gone Tamale (Freleng/Aug 29/GC V4) - 1959
671. Bonanza Bunny (McKimson/Sep 5/BB80) - 1959
672. A Broken Leghorn (McKimson/Sept 26/GC V1/FL) - 1959
673. Wild About Hurry (Jones/Oct 10/CV V1) - 1959
674. A Witch's Tangled Hare (Levitow/Oct 31/PC V1) - 1959
675. People Are Bunny (McKimson/Dec 19/DDcw/BB80) - 1959
676. Fastest with the Mostest (Jones/Jan 9/CV V2) - 1960
677. West of the Pesos (McKimson/Jan 23/GC V4) - 1960
678. Horse Hare (Freleng/Feb 13/CV V3) - 1960
679. Goldimouse and the Three Cats (Freleng/Mar 15/GC V5/MM/CV V3) - 1960
680. Person to Bunny (Freleng/Apr 2/DDcw/BB80) - 1960
681. Who Scent You? (Jones/Apr 23/PLP) - 1960
682. Hyde and Go Tweet (Freleng/May 14/CC V4) - 1960
683. Rabbit's Feat (Jones/Jun 4/BB80)
684. Crockett-Doodle-Do (McKimson/Jun 25/FL) - 1960
685. Mouse and Garden (Freleng/Jul 16/GC V4/PC V3) - 1960
686. Ready, Woolen and Able (Jones/Jul 30/CV V1) - 1960
687. Mice Follies (McKimson/Aug 20/CV V3) - 1960
688. From Hare to Heir (Freleng/Sep 3/BBcw/BB80) - 1960
689. The Dixie Fryer (McKimson/Sep 24/CV V1) - 1960
690. Hopalong Casualty (Jones/Oct 8/CC V4) - 1960
691. Dog Gone People (McKimson/Nov 12/PP) - 1960
692. High Note (Jones/Dec 3/PC V3) - 1960
693. Lighter Than Hare (Freleng/Dec 17/BBcw/CC V4) - 1960
694. Cannery Woe (McKimson/Jan 7/GC V4) - 1961
695. Zip 'N Snort (Jones/Jan 21/CV V1) - 1961
696. Hoppy Daze (McKimson/Feb 11/MM) - 1961
697. The Mouse on 57th Street (Jones/Feb 25/CC V3) - 1961
698. Strangled Eggs (McKimson/Mar 18/FL) - 1961
699. Birds of a Father (McKimson/Apr 1/MM) - 1961
700. D' Fightin' Ones (Freleng/Apr 22/CC V4) - 1961
701. The Abominable Snow Rabbit (Jones/May 20/GC V5) - 1961
702. Lickety-Splat (Jones/Jun 3/CC V2) - 1961
703. A Scent of the Matterhorn (Jones/Jun 24/PLP) - 1961
704. The Rebel Without Claws (Freleng/Jul 15/CC V2) - 1961
705. Compressed Hare (Jones/Jul 29/BB80) - 1961
706. The Pied Piper of Guadalupe (Freleng/Aug 19/GC V4/PC V3) - 1961
707. Prince Violent (Freleng/Sep 2/BB80) - 1961
708. Daffy's Inn Trouble (McKimson/Sep 23/DDcw) - 1961
709. Beep Prepared (Jones/Nov 11/PC V3) - 1961
710. The Last Hungry Cat (Freleng/Dec 2/GC V3/FF/CV V2) - 1961
711. Nelly's Folly (Jones/Dec 30/PC V3) - 1961
712. Wet Hare (McKimson/Jan 20/CC V3) - 1962
713. A Sheep in the Deep (Jones/Feb 10/CV V2) - 1962
714. Fish and Slips (Jones/Mar 10/MM) - 1962
715. Quackodile Tears (Davis/Mar 31/CV V1) - 1962
716. Crows' Feat (Freleng and Pratt/Apr 21/FL) - 1962
717. Mexican Boarders (Freleng/May 12/GC V4/CV V2) - 1962
718. Bill of Hare (McKimson/Jun 9/PC V1) - 1962
719. Zoom at the Top (Jones/Jun 30/CV V2) - 1962
720. Louvre Come Back to Me! (Jones and Noble/Aug 18/PLP) - 1962
721. Honey's Money (Freleng/Sep 1/PC V3) - 1962
722. Mother Was a Rooster (McKimson/Oct 20/CV V2) - 1962
723. Shishkabugs (Freleng/Dec 8/BB80) - 1962
724. Martian Through Georgia (Jones & Levitow/Dec 29/GC V6) - 1962
725. I Was a Teenage Thumb (Jones/Jan 9/CV V2) - 1963
726. Devil's Feud Cake (Freleng/Feb 9/CC V4) - 1963
727. The Million Hare (McKimson/Apr 6/BBcw/BB80) - 1963
728. Now Hear This (Jones/Apr 27/GC V6) - 1963
729. Woolen Under Where (Monroe and Thompson/May 11/CV V2) - 1963
730. Hare-Breadth Hurry (Jones/Jun 8/CC V2) - 1963
731. Banty Raids (McKimson/Jun 29/FL/CV V1) - 1963
732. Chili Weather (Freleng/Aug 17/GC V4) - 1963
733. The Unmentionables (Freleng/Sep 7/BB80) - 1963
734. Mad as a Mars Hare (Jones/Oct 19/BBcw/PC V1) - 1963
735. Claws in the Lease (McKimson/Nov 9/MM) - 1963
736. Transylvania 6-5000 (Jones/Nov 30/GC V5) - 1963
737. To Beep or Not to Beep (Jones/Dec 28/GC V3/CV V2) - 1963
738. Dumb Patrol (Chiniquy/Jan 18/CC V3) - 1964
739. A Message to Gracias (McKimson/Feb 8/GC V4) - 1964
740. Freudy Cat (McKimson/Mar 14/MM) - 1964
741. Dr. Devil and Mr. Hare (McKimson/Mar 28/BBcw/PC V1) - 1964
742. Nuts and Volts (Freleng/Apr 25/GC V4) - 1964
743. The Iceman Ducketh (Monroe/May 16/DDcw) - 1964
744. War and Pieces (Jones/Jun 6/CC V3) - 1964
745. False Hare (McKimson/Jul 18/BBcw/BB80) - 1964
746. Señorella and the Glass Huarache (Pratt/Aug 1/GC V5) - 1964
747. Pancho's Hideaway (Freleng/Oct 24/GC V4) - 1964
748. Road to Andalay (Freleng/Dec 26/CC V4) - 1964
749. The Wild Chase (Freleng/Feb 27/GC V4) - 1965
750. Suppressed Duck (McKimson/Jun 26/DDcw) - 1965
751. Corn on the Cop (Spector/Jul 24/PP) - 1965
752. Boulder Wham! (Larriva/Oct 9/SH) - 1965
753. Hairied and Hurried (Larriva/Nov 13/SH) - 1965
754. Highway Runnery (Larriva/Dec 11/SH) - 1965
755. Chaser on the Rocks (Larriva/Dec 25/SH) - 1965
756. Shot and Bothered (Larriva/Jan 8/SH) - 1966
757. Out and Out Rout (Larriva/Jan 29/SH) - 1966
758. The Solid Tin Coyote (Larriva/Feb 19/SH) - 1966
759. Clippety Clobbered (Larriva/Mar 12/SH) - 1966
760. A-Haunting We Will Go (McKimson/Apr 26/GC V4/PC V1) - 1966
761. Sugar and Spies (McKimson/Nov 5/SH) - 1966
762. Norman Normal (Lovy/Feb 3/GC V6) - 1968
763. Bunny and Claude (We Rob Carrot Patches) (McKimson/Nov 23/PP) - 1968
764. The Great Carrot Train Robbery (McKimson/Jan 25/PP) - 1969
765. The Duxorcist (Ford and Lennon/Nov 20/EDD) - 1987
766. The Night of the Living Duck (Ford and Lennon/Sept 23/EDD) - 1988
767. (Blooper) Bunny (Ford and Lennon/Feb/GC V1s/BB80) - 1991
768. Daffy & Porky in the William Tell Overture (Haskett and Fossati/Apr 17/GC V4s) (NT) - 1991
769. Invasion of the Bunny Snatchers (Ford/Aug 25/EBB) - 1992
770. Chariots of Fur (Jones/Dec 21/SH) - 1994 (NT)
771. Carrotblanca (McCarthy/EBB) - 1995
772. Another Froggy Evening (Jones/Jan/PC V1s) - 1995
773. Superior Duck (Jones/PC V1s/EDD) - 1996
774. From Hare to Eternity (Jones/PC V1s) - 1997
775. Father of the Bird (Fossati/PC V1s) - 1997
776. Little Go Beep (Brandt/Dec 30/SH) - 2000
777. Daffy Duck for President (Brandt and Cervone/Nov 2/GC V2s/EDD) (NT) - 2003
778. Attack of the Drones (Moore/EDD) (NT) - 2003
779. Hare and Loathing in Las Vegas (Kopp and Shin/EBB) - 2003
780. Whizzard of Ow (Haaland/Nov 1/SH) - 2003
781. Museum Scream (Povenmire/Mar 31/PC V1s) - 2004
782. Coyote Falls (O'Callaghan/Jul 20/SH) - 2010
783. Fur of Flying (O'Callaghan/Sep 24/SH) - 2010
784. Rabid Rider (O'Callaghan/Dec 17/SH) - 2010

=== Additional cartoons included as special features ===
In addition to the main Looney Tunes DVD and Blu-Ray collections, many cartoons have been released as bonus cartoons on miscellaneous DVDs by Warner Bros. Home Entertainment. Some Looney Tunes collections like Golden Collection: Volume 6 and Mouse Chronicles included unrestored cartoons as extras. Until 2020, most of these bonus cartoons were unrestored using Turner and THIS Dubbed Prints. Restored versions of most of these cartoons were available on HBO Max from May 27, 2020 to March 16, 2025, and on Tubi since August 15, 2025. Since 2021, restored versions of the cartoons have also aired on MeTV and its sister channel MeTV Toons.

1. Bosko, the Talk-Ink Kid (Harman and Ising/GC V1s NR/PC V2s NR) - 1929
2. Sinkin' in the Bathtub (Harman and Ising/Apr/GC V3s NR/PC V2s NR) - 1930
3. Big Man from the North (Harman and Ising/Dec 6/Smart Money DVD NR) - 1930
4. Dumb Patrol (Harman and Ising/Mar 2/Safe in Hell Blu-Ray) - 1931
5. Lady, Play Your Mandolin! (Ising/Aug 2/GC V1s NR/PC V2s NR) - 1931
6. Bosko's Soda Fountain (Harman/Nov 14/It's a Wise Child Blu-Ray NR) - 1931
7. Bosko's Fox Hunt (Harman/Dec 12/It's a Wise Child Blu-Ray NR) - 1931
8. Red-Headed Baby (Ising/Dec 26/Cimarron DVD NR/Cimarron Blu-Ray) - 1931
9. Freddy the Freshman (Ising/Feb 20/The Mask of Fu Manchu Blu-Ray) - 1932
10. Crosby, Columbo, and Vallee (Ising/Mar 19/20,000 Years in Sing Sing Blu-Ray NR) - 1932
11. Goopy Geer (Ising/Apr 16/The Beast of the City Blu-Ray) - 1932
12. Bosko and Bruno (Harman/Apr 30/The Beast of the City Blu-Ray NR/Skyscraper Souls Blu-Ray NR) - 1932
13. It's Got Me Again! (Ising/May 14/GC V3s NR/PC V2s NR) - 1932
14. Moonlight for Two (Ising/Jun 11/Forbidden Hollywood Vol. 3 DVD NR/Tarzan the Ape Man Blu-Ray) - 1932
15. The Queen Was in the Parlor (Ising/Jul 9/The Mask of Fu Manchu Blu-Ray/20,000 Years in Sing Sing Blu-Ray) - 1932
16. I Love a Parade (Ising/Aug 6/GC V6s NR) - 1932
17. Bosko's Store (Harman/Aug 13/Jewel Robbery Blu-Ray NR) - 1932
18. You're Too Careless with Your Kisses! (Ising/Sep 10/Jewel Robbery Blu-Ray) - 1932
19. I Wish I Had Wings (Ising/Oct 15/Tarzan the Ape Man Blu-Ray) - 1932
20. A Great Big Bunch of You (Ising/Nov 12/One Way Passage Blu-Ray) - 1932
21. The Shanty Where Santy Claus Lives (Ising/Dec 24/Lady Killer DVD NR) - 1932
22. One Step Ahead of My Shadow (Ising/Feb 4/Forbidden Hollywood Vol. 3 DVD NR/Footlight Parade Blu-Ray NR) - 1933
23. Young and Healthy (Ising/Mar 4/Footlight Parade DVD & Blu-Ray NR/42nd Street Blu-Ray NR) - 1933
24. The Organ Grinder (Ising/Apr 8/The Mayor of Hell DVD NR/Little Women Blu-Ray) - 1933
25. Wake Up the Gypsy in Me (Ising/May 13/Picture Snatcher DVD NR) - 1933
26. I Like Mountain Music (Ising/Jun 10/Flying Down to Rio DVD NR/GC V6s NR/Ladies They Talk About Blu-Ray/Little Women Blu-Ray/The Gay Divorcee Blu-Ray) - 1933
27. Bosko's Mechanical Man (Harman/Jul 29/Morning Glory DVD NR) - 1933
28. Sittin' on a Backyard Fence (Duvall/Dec 16/GC V6s NR/Forbidden Hollywood: Vol. 3 DVD NR/Footlight Parade Blu-Ray NR) - 1933
29. Pettin' in the Park (Brown/Jan 27/Gold Diggers of 1933 DVD NR/Gold Diggers of 1933 Blu-Ray) - 1934
30. How Do I Know It's Sunday (Freleng/Jun 9/GC V6s NR) - 1934
31. Why Do I Dream Those Dreams (Freleng/Jun 30/Sadie McKee Blu-Ray) - 1934
32. Those Beautiful Dames (Freleng/Nov 10/Dames DVD NR) - 1934
33. Pop Goes Your Heart (Freleng/Dec 8/Sadie McKee Blu-Ray) - 1934
34. Into Your Dance (Freleng/Jun 8/Annie Oakley DVD NR) - 1935
35. The Country Mouse (Freleng/Jul 13/MCs) - 1935
36. Buddy the Gee Man (King/Aug 24/G Men DVD NR) - 1935
37. The Lady in Red (Freleng/Sep 7/Joe's Apartment Blu-Ray) - 1935
38. The Phantom Ship (King/Feb 1/The Devil-Doll Blu-Ray) - 1936
39. The Cat Came Back (Freleng/Feb 8/The Walking Dead Blu-Ray) - 1936
40. I'm a Big Shot Now (Freleng/Apr 11/Bullets or Ballots DVD NR) - 1936
41. Bingo Crosbyana (Freleng/May 30/Swing Time DVD NR) - 1936
42. Toy Town Hall (Freleng/Sep 19/Shall We Dance DVD NR/The Great Ziegfeld Blu-Ray) - 1936
43. Ain't We Got Fun (Avery/May 1/The Life of Emile Zola DVD NR) - 1937
44. Porky's Building (Tashlin/Jun 19/It's Love I'm After Blu-Ray) - 1937
45. Porky's Badtime Story (Clampett/Jul 24/It's Love I'm After Blu-Ray) - 1937
46. Plenty of Money and You (Freleng/Jul 31/Gold Diggers of 1937 DVD NR/The Prince and the Pauper Blu-Ray) - 1937
47. A Sunbonnet Blue (Avery/Aug 21/The Prince and the Pauper Blu-Ray) - 1937
48. Dog Daze (Freleng/Sep 18/Rover Dangerfield Blu-Ray) - 1937
49. The Lyin' Mouse (Freleng/Oct 16/MCs NR) - 1937
50. Porky's Hero Agency (Clampett/Dec 4/Marked Woman DVD NR/Marked Woman Blu-Ray) - 1937
51. September in the Rain (Freleng/Dec 18/Carefree DVD NR) - 1937
52. Porky's Five and Ten (Clampett/Apr 16/Hollywood Hotel DVD NR/The Shining Hour Blu-Ray) - 1938
53. Love and Curses (Hardway and Dalton/Jul 9/Gold Diggers in Paris DVD NR/The Shining Hour Blu-Ray/Sweethearts Blu-Ray) - 1938
54. Porky & Daffy (Clampett/Aug 6/Angels with Dirty Faces DVD NR/Angels with Dirty Faces Blu-Ray) - 1938
55. Porky the Gob (Hardaway & Dalton/Dec 17/The Mad Miss Manton Blu-Ray) - 1938
56. Count Me Out (Hardway and Dalton/Dec 17/The Amazing Dr. Clitterhouse DVD NR/Sweethearts Blu-Ray) - 1938
57. The Mice Will Play (Avery/Dec 31/Jezebel DVD NR/MCs NR) - 1938
58. The Lone Stranger and Porky (Clampett/Jan 7/The Hunchback of Notre Dame Blu-Ray NR) - 1939
59. Dog Gone Modern (Jones/Jan 14/The Return of Doctor X Blu-Ray) - 1939
60. It's an Ill Wind (Hardway & Dalton/Jan 28/Idiot's Delight Blu-Ray) - 1939
61. Detouring America (Avery/Aug 26/Each Dawn I Die DVD & Blu-Ray NR) - 1939
62. Porky's Hotel (Clampett/Sep 2/The Return of Doctor X Blu-Ray) - 1939
63. Land of the Midnight Fun (Avery/Sep 23/Allegheny Uprising DVD NR) - 1939
64. The Good Egg (Jones/Oct 21/Idiot's Delight Blu-Ray) - 1939
65. Busy Bakers (Hardway and Dalton/Feb 10/Brother Orchid DVD NR) - 1940
66. Confederate Honey (Freleng/Mar 30/Virginia City DVD NR) - 1940
67. Sniffles Takes a Trip (Jones/May 11/GC V6s NR) - 1940
68. Circus Today (Avery/Jun 22/It All Came True Blu-Ray) - 1940
69. Little Blabbermouse (Freleng/Jul 6/MCs NR) - 1940
70. Ceiling Hero (Avery/Aug 24/Stranger on the Third Floor Blu-Ray) - 1940
71. Malibu Beach Party (Freleng/Sep 14/Dance, Girl, Dance DVD NR) - 1940
72. Stage Fright (Jones/Sep 28/City for Conquest DVD NR/Mr. and Mrs. Smith Blu-Ray) - 1940
73. Holiday Highlights (Avery/Oct 12/Mr. and Mrs. Smith Blu-Ray) - 1940
74. Wacky Wildlife (Avery/Nov 9/Stranger on the Third Floor Blu-Ray) - 1940
75. Shop, Look, and Listen (Freleng/Dec 21/MCs NR/Too Many Girls DVD NR) - 1940
76. The Fighting 69th½ (Freleng/Jan 18/The Fighting 69th DVD NR/GC V6s NR) - 1941
77. The Crackpot Quail (Avery/Feb 15/Tex Avery Screwball Classics: Volume 3 DVD & Blu-Ray) - 1941
78. Snow Time for Comedy (Jones/Aug 30/Manpower Blu-Ray) - 1941
79. Hobby Horse-Laffs (McCabe/Jun 6/Gentleman Jim Blu-Ray) - 1942
80. Fresh Hare (Freleng/Aug 22/Captains of the Clouds DVD NR) - 1942
81. Confusions of a Nutzy Spy (McCabe/Jan 23/GC V6s NR) - 1943
82. Hop and Go (McCabe/Mar 27/GC V6s NR) - 1943
83. I Taw a Putty Tat (Freleng/Apr 2/GC V4s NR) - 1948
84. The Shell Shocked Egg (McKimson/Jul 10/Act of Violence Blu-Ray) - 1948
85. Mouse Mazurka (Freleng/Jun 11/MCs NR) - 1949
86. Sleepy Time Possum (McKimson/Nov 3/GC V6s NR) - 1951
87. Mouse-Warming (Jones/Sep 8/MCs NR) - 1952
88. Punch Trunk (Jones/Dec 19/GC V6s NR) - 1953
89. Boyhood Daze (Jones/Apr 20/GC V6s NR) - 1957
90. Mouse-Taken Identity (McKimson/Nov 16/MCs) - 1957
91. Wild Wild World (McKimson/Feb 27/GC V6s NR) - 1960
92. Mice Follies (McKimson/Aug 20/MCs NR) - 1960
93. Bartholomew Versus the Wheel (McKimson/Feb 29/GC V6s) - 1964
94. The Iceman Ducketh (Monroe/May 16/Dear Heart Blu-Ray) - 1964
95. Hawaiian Aye Aye (Chiniquy/Jun 27/Dear Heart Blu-Ray) - 1964
96. It's Nice to Have a Mouse Around the House (Freleng/Jan 16/MCs NR) - 1965
97. Well Worn Daffy (McKimson/May 22/Brainstorm Blu-Ray) - 1965
98. Merlin the Magic Mouse (Lovy/Nov 18/MCs NR) - 1967

== See also ==
- Looney Tunes and Merrie Melodies filmography
  - Looney Tunes and Merrie Melodies filmography (1930–1939)
  - Looney Tunes and Merrie Melodies filmography (1940–1949)
  - Looney Tunes and Merrie Melodies filmography (1950–1959)
  - Looney Tunes and Merrie Melodies filmography (1960–1969)
  - Looney Tunes and Merrie Melodies filmography (1970–present)
- The Golden Age of Looney Tunes
- Looney Tunes Super Stars - the successor series of DVDs dedicated to one star of the series per DVD
- Looney Tunes Platinum Collection Blu-ray successor
