= The Gold Diggers' Song (We're in the Money) =

1933 song from Warner Bros. film

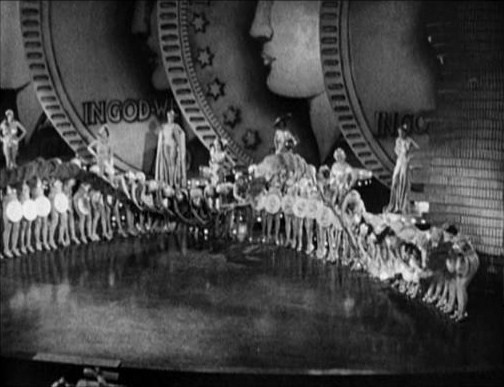
"Dance of the Dollars" production number launches the song in Gold Diggers of 1933

"The Gold Diggers' Song (We're in the Money)" is a song from the 1933 Warner Bros. Pictures film Gold Diggers of 1933, sung in the opening sequence by Ginger Rogers and chorus. The entire song is never performed in the 1933 movie, though it introduces the film in the opening scene (wherein the performance is busted up by the police). Later in the movie, the tune is heard off stage in rehearsal as the director continues a discussion on camera about other matters.

The lyrics were written by Al Dubin and the music by Harry Warren. It became a standard with a well-known melody. It is one of the songs of the Broadway musical 42nd Street.

== Lyrics ==
"The Gold Diggers' Song (We're in the Money)"
As sung by Dick Powell in his 1933 recording

The song's lyrics reflect a positive financial turnaround and a fantasized end to the Great Depression, which in the U.S. began to turn around in early 1933 but wouldn't actually end until the late 1930s:

== Early versions ==
Early popular recordings of this song were performed by Ted Lewis & His Band and by Hal Kemp & His Orchestra. Dick Powell, who does not sing a note of "The Golddigger's Song" in the motion picture, recorded a version that also sold well. Other 1933 versions were by The Dorsey Brothers (vocal by The Boswell Sisters), and Leo Reisman and His Orchestra (vocal by Fred Astaire).

== Other recordings ==
- Bing Crosby recorded the song in 1954 for use on his radio show and it was subsequently included in the box set The Bing Crosby CBS Radio Recordings (1954–56) issued by Mosaic Records (catalog MD7-245) in 2009.
- Connie Francis included the song on her album Connie & Clyde - Hit Songs of the 30s (1968).
- Rosemary Clooney included the song in her album Dedicated to Nelson (1996).
- Mihoko Tokoro performs a version of this song in Japanese for the 1996 film My Fellow Americans. This version also appears on the film's soundtrack album.
- American band the Cherry Poppin' Daddies recorded a version for their 2016 covers album The Boop-A-Doo.

== In other Warner Bros. productions ==
"The Gold Diggers' Song (We're in the Money)" song was used again in several other Warner Bros. productions. It appears as the theme song of the 1933 Merrie Melodies cartoon We're in the Money and as the theme and source music two years later in the 1935 film We're in the Money. It also appears in other Warner Bros. cartoons with musical scores arranged by Carl W. Stalling and/or Milt Franklyn, often to underscore scenes where a character has gained a lot of money or thinks that they're about to.

The song appears in the 1962 film The Chapman Report, played by a calliope at an amusement park. In the 1967 film Bonnie and Clyde, starring Warren Beatty and Faye Dunaway, the titular criminals hide out in a theatre where, the film being set during the Great Depression, Gold Diggers of 1933 is being shown. Bonnie (Dunaway) is enjoying the song, while Clyde (Beatty) is furiously reprimanding getaway driver C.W. Moss (Michael J. Pollard) after a bank robbery gone bad.
