= Bosko's Picture Show =

1933 film by Hugh Harman and Isadore Freleng

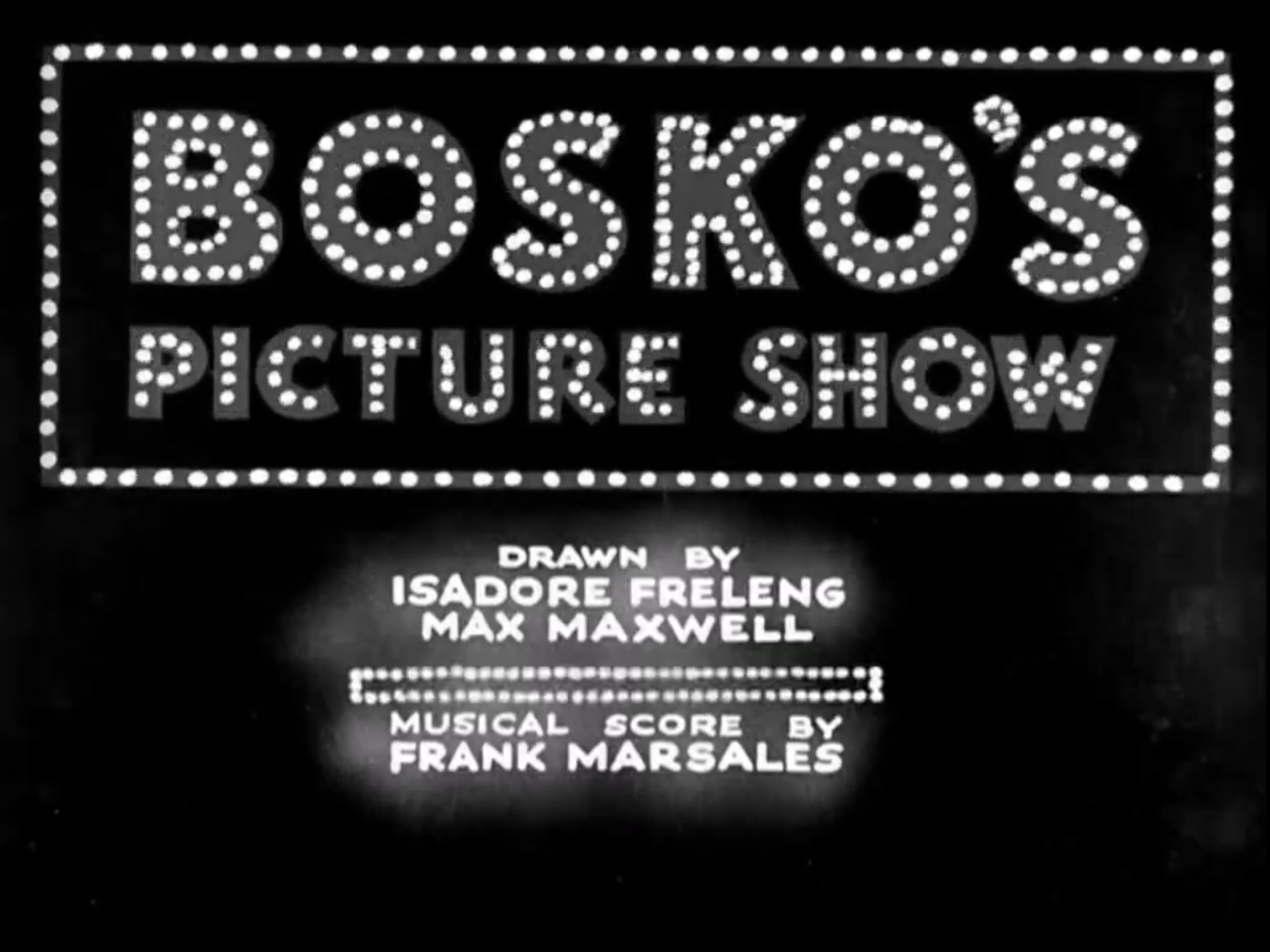
- Title card
- Directed by: Hugh Harman; Isadore Freleng
- Produced by: Hugh Harman; Rudolf Ising; Leon Schlesinger
- Starring: Johnny Murray; Rochelle Hudson
- Music by: Frank Marsales
- Animation by: Isadore Freleng; Max Maxwell
- Color process: Black-and-white
- Production companies: Harman-Ising Productions; Leon Schlesinger Productions
- Distributed by: Warner Bros. Pictures; The Vitaphone Corporation
- Release date: August 22, 1933
- Running time: 7 minutes
- Country: United States
- Language: English

Bosko's Picture Show is a 1933 American animated comedy short film directed by Hugh Harman and Isadore Freleng. It is the 38th and final film in the Looney Tunes series starring Bosko and produced by Harman-Ising Productions. It is the last film in the series to be animated by Freleng, who was promoted to director upon returning, and Maxwell, who stopped animating and became the production manager at Metro-Goldwyn-Mayer. It was released on August 22, 1933. The short is notorious for a line where Bosko appears to say the word "fuck", sparking debate on whether it was deliberate or the result of a technical error occluding a more innocuous term.

== Plot ==
Bosko organizes his own "picture show" at a movie theater. He emerges to play the organ and sing the song "We're in the Money" (1933), while the screen displays lyrics in a parody of the Screen Songs series.

The film then proceeds a parody newsreel titled Out-Of-Tone News. It humorously depicts events such as a supposed peace conference between the League of Nations at Geneva, Switzerland where country leaders engage in hand-to-hand combat, while a ring announcer gives a blow-by-blow description of the action. Another report notes that the Sunkist Bathing Beauties enjoy the sunshine of Malibu, California, only to depict a single, unattractive woman on a beach during a snowstorm who flees from a tidal wave. The next report depicts boxer "Jack Dumpsey" (Jack Dempsey) to be training for a comeback at Reno, Nevada, but is depicted as a withered old man with a cane (the real life Dempsey had retired for years). The next report depicts a greyhound race located at "Epsom Salts, England"; the defending champion Bruno, Bosko's pet dog, is depicted sniffing around and trailing his competitors, until he finds himself chased by the Marx Brothers, equipped as dog catchers. The final scene of the newsreel takes place in "Pretzel, Germany", where Adolf Hitler is depicted as a ruthless buffoon wearing lederhosen and a swastika armband, pursuing Jimmy Durante with an axe in hand for apparently having a Jewish nose.

The newsreel is followed by a short subject parodying Laurel and Hardy, who are called here "Haurel and Lardy", starring in "Spite of Everything". The two comedians are depicted finding a cooling pie on a window sill and stealing it. Then they argue over ownership of the pie. The pie switches hands many times, until Haurel ends their rivalry by pieing Lardy. In retaliation, Lardy uses a discarded pot to hit Haurel. The subject ends with Haurel crying.

The last film of the show follows. It is a "TNT Pictures" production, its logo featuring a roaring (and burping) lion, a parody of Metro-Goldwyn-Mayer's various lion mascots. The film itself is a melodrama set in the 1890s, entitled "He Done Her Dirt (and How!)". Honey, Bosko's girlfriend, is depicted riding a bicycle. She is followed by the Marx Brothers, who sing "Daisy Bell". The villain, Dirty Dalton, is also following her. Dalton hides behind a tree and manages to ambush and abduct Honey, leaping on top of a boxcar to escape. Honey breaks the fourth wall by asking for assistance from the audience. Bosko volunteers to save her and leaps towards the screen. In a choreographed sequence, Bosko jumps into Dalton's head, which does not free Honey but regardless puts a stop to Dalton's intentions, as he is seen as the hero by Honey and the audience.

== Profanity ==
When the villain first appears onscreen, Bosko shouts what sounds like "The dirty fuck." The word is not clearly heard, due to a muffled vowel and it has been argued that a flaw in the soundtrack rendered profane a more "polite" phrase, such as "dirty fox" or "dirty thug". Animator Mark Kausler has studied the lip movements of the character and insisted that "hawk" was the intended word. He initially believed that the sound flaw only appeared on the 16 mm film version, and tried to re-record the sound from a 35 mm, nitrate film to correct this, leading to no better results, since listeners still heard the disputed word as "fuck". Animation historian Jerry Beck also had several people see the film, and they all concluded that Bosko did indeed call the film villain a "dirty fuck."

According to the Looney Tunes Golden Collection: Volume 6 DVD set, the subtitles for that scene read "The dirty fox!", despite that "The dirty fuck!" can clearly be heard. Fans have theorized that the inclusion of "fuck" was most likely a parting farewell shot by Harman and Ising to producer Leon Schlesinger, who had refused to raise their budgets.

== Home media ==
Bosko's Picture Show is available uncut, uncensored, and digitally remastered on disc 3 of the Looney Tunes Golden Collection: Volume 6 DVD set.

== Legacy ==
Aside from newsreels, the short is argued to be the first depiction of Hitler in an American film, although there is an earlier appearance in the August 1933 short Cubby's World Flight by the Van Beuren Studios; while flying over Germany, Cubby Bear receives smiles and waves from both Chancellor Hitler and President Paul von Hindenburg. Ironically, this short was produced by Harman-Ising after they had broken ties with Schlesinger.

== Sources ==
- Birdwell, Michael E. (1999), "Warner Bros. and the Opening Salvos against Nazism, 1934–1939", Celluloid Soldiers: Warner Bros.'s Campaign Against Nazism, New York University Press, ISBN 978-0814798713
- Cohen, Karl F. (2004), "Censorship of Theatrical Animation", Forbidden Animation: Censored Cartoons and Blacklisted Animators in America, McFarland & Company, ISBN 978-0786420322
- Shull, Michael S.; Wilt, David E. (2004), "Animated Talkies During the 1930s: A Political Overview", Doing Their Bit: Wartime American Animated Short Films, 1939-1945, McFarland & Company, ISBN 978-0786481699
- Welky, David (2008), "Fires at Home, Fires Abroad", The Moguls and the Dictators: Hollywood and the Coming of World War II, Johns Hopkins University Press, ISBN 978-0801890444
