= Looney Tunes Golden Collection: Volume 6 =

2008 American DVD box set

- DVD cover
- Directed by: Chuck Jones; Friz Freleng; Robert McKimson; Rudolf Ising; Hugh Harman; Bob Clampett; Norman McCabe; Earl Duvall; Jack King; Maurice Noble; Tex Avery; Abe Levitow; Alex Lovy; Tom Palmer
- Produced by: Leon Schlesinger; Eddie Selzer; John W. Burton; David H. DePatie; William L. Hendricks; Paul Stookey
- Starring: The voices of Mel Blanc; Tommy Bond; Bernice Hansen; The Varsity Three; Paul Stookey; Dave Dixon; Arthur Q. Bryan
- Edited by: Treg Brown; Hal Geer
- Music by: Carl W. Stalling; Milt Franklyn; William Lava; Paul Stookey
- Distributed by: Warner Home Video
- Release date: October 21, 2008 (United States)
- Country: United States
- Language: English

Looney Tunes Golden Collection: Volume 6 is a four-disc DVD box set collection of Looney Tunes and Merrie Melodies cartoons. Following the pattern of one release each year of the previous volumes, it was released on October 21, 2008. It is the final release in the Looney Tunes Golden Collection series. The set was almost canceled after Volume 5's disappointing sales, despite many remasters and bonus features already being completed. After pushback from those working on the set, such as Jerry Beck, Warner allowed the team to finish and release the set, with the set's selection of cartoons featuring many shorts originally intended for future volumes. Succeeding the Golden Collection series would be the Looney Tunes Platinum Collection series on Blu-ray, first released November 2011. On July 3, 2012, a two-disc DVD version of Volume 1 of the Platinum Collection was released.

Volume 6 of the Golden Collection series is less child-friendly than previous releases. Like Volumes 3–5, it has a warning before each disc about the shorts containing content that some viewers would not consider to be "politically correct" by today's standards (but will be shown uncut and uncensored for historical reasons), and as such, is "intended for the adult collector" and might not be suitable for younger audiences.

In addition to containing cartoons that have racial and/or ethnic stereotypes (like in Volumes 3–5), a use of the word "fuck" in Bosko's Picture Show, and references to sexism in Robert McKimson's Wild Wife, Volume 6 also contains many cartoons that pertain to World War II, most of them containing depictions or references to Adolf Hitler and Hideki Tojo, or to Nazi Germany and Imperial Japan in general. While Volumes 4 and 5 each had a couple World War II-themed cartoons (Plane Daffy and Scrap Happy Daffy, respectively), Volume 6 is notable for having an entire disc dedicated to the subject (Disc 2: Patriotic Pals), including several of its bonus cartoons.

Volume 6 was originally only released in North America due to the poor sales of the previous volume. However, the discs in this volume were not region-coded, making it easy for collectors outside of North America to import and play this set. The set was released in the UK on September 12, 2011.

== Disc 1: Looney Tunes All-Stars ==
#	Title	Characters	Director	Year	Series
1	Hare Trigger	Bugs, Sam	Friz Freleng	1945	MM
2	To Duck or Not to Duck	Daffy, Elmer	Chuck Jones	1943	LT
3	Birth of a Notion	Daffy	Robert McKimson	1947	LT
4	My Little Duckaroo	Daffy, Porky, Nasty Canasta	Chuck Jones	1954	MM
5	Crowing Pains	Foghorn, Henery, Sylvester, Barnyard	Robert McKimson	1947	LT
6	Raw! Raw! Rooster!	Foghorn	Robert McKimson	1956	LT
7	Heaven Scent	Pepé, Penelope	Chuck Jones	1956	MM
8	My Favorite Duck	Daffy, Porky	Chuck Jones	1942	LT
9	Jumpin' Jupiter	Porky, Sylvester	Chuck Jones	1955	MM
10	Satan's Waitin'	Tweety, Sylvester	Friz Freleng	1954	LT
11	Hook, Line and Stinker	Wile E. Coyote and the Road Runner	Chuck Jones	1958	LT
12	Bear Feat	The Three Bears	Chuck Jones	1949	LT
13	Dog Gone South	Charlie, Colonel Shuffle	Chuck Jones	1950	MM
14	A Ham in a Role	Goofy Gophers	Robert McKimson	1949	LT
15	Often an Orphan	Porky, Charlie	Chuck Jones	1949	MM

=== Special Features ===
==== Commentaries ====
- Hare Trigger by Greg Ford
- Birth of a Notion by Mark Kausler
- My Favorite Duck by Jerry Beck

==== Music-only tracks ====
- Raw! Raw! Rooster!
- Jumpin' Jupiter

==== Television specials ====
- Bugs Bunny in King Arthur's Court (1978)
- Daffy Duck’s Easter Eggcitement (1980)

=== Bonus Shorts ===
#	Title	Characters	Director	Year	Series
B1	Sniffles Takes a Trip	Sniffles	Chuck Jones	1940	MM
B2	Hippety Hopper	Sylvester, Hippety Hopper	Robert McKimson	1949	MM
B3	Rabbit Rampage	Bugs	Chuck Jones	1955	LT
B4	Boyhood Daze	Ralph Phillips	Chuck Jones	1957	MM

==== Bonus Shorts - Music-only tracks ====
- Rabbit Rampage
- Boyhood Daze

== Disc 2: Patriotic Pals ==
#	Title	Characters	Director	Year	Series
1	Herr Meets Hare	Bugs	Friz Freleng	1945	MM
2	Russian Rhapsody	N/A	Bob Clampett	1944	MM
3	Daffy – The Commando	Daffy	Friz Freleng	1943	LT
4	Bosko the Doughboy	Bosko	Hugh Harman	1931	LT
5	Rookie Revue	N/A	Friz Freleng	1941	MM
6	The Draft Horse	N/A	Chuck Jones	1942	MM
7	Wacky Blackout	N/A	Bob Clampett	1942	LT
8	The Ducktators	N/A	Norman McCabe	1942	LT
9	The Weakly Reporter	N/A	Chuck Jones	1944	MM
10	Fifth-Column Mouse	N/A	Friz Freleng	1943	MM
11	Meet John Doughboy	Porky	Bob Clampett	1941	LT
12	Hollywood Canine Canteen	Babbit and Catstello	Robert McKimson	1946	MM
13	By Word of Mouse	Sylvester	Friz Freleng	1954	LT
14	Heir-Conditioned	Sylvester, Elmer	Friz Freleng	1955	LT
15	Yankee Dood It	Sylvester, Elmer	Friz Freleng	1956	MM

=== Special features ===
==== Friz Freleng at MGM ====
- Poultry Pirates (1938)
- A Day at the Beach (1938)
- The Captain's Christmas (1938)
- Seal Skinners (1939)
- Mama's New Hat (1939)

==== Commentaries ====
- Herr Meets Hare by Greg Ford
- Russian Rhapsody by Mark Kausler
- The Draft Horse by Greg Ford

==== Music-only track ====
- Yankee Dood It

=== Bonus Shorts ===
#	Title	Characters	Director	Year	Series
B1	The Fighting 69½th	N/A	Friz Freleng	1941	MM
B2	Hop and Go	N/A	Norman McCabe	1943	LT
B3	Confusions of a Nutzy Spy	Porky	Norman McCabe	1943	LT

== Disc 3: Bosko, Buddy and Merrie Melodies ==
All cartoons on this disc are in black-and-white.

#	Title	Characters	Director	Year	Series
1	Congo Jazz	Bosko	Hugh Harman and Rudolf Ising	1930	LT
2	Smile, Darn Ya, Smile!	Foxy	Rudolf Ising	1931	MM
3	The Booze Hangs High	Bosko	Hugh Harman and Rudolf Ising	1930	LT
4	One More Time	Foxy	Rudolf Ising	1931	MM
5	Bosko's Picture Show	Bosko	Hugh Harman and Friz Freleng	1933	LT
6	You Don't Know What You're Doin'!	Piggy	Rudolf Ising	1931	MM
7	We're in the Money	N/A	Rudolf Ising	1933	MM
8	Ride Him, Bosko!	Bosko	Hugh Harman	1932	LT
9	Shuffle Off to Buffalo	N/A	Rudolf Ising and Friz Freleng	1933	MM
10	Bosko in Person	Bosko	Hugh Harman and Friz Freleng	1933	LT
11	The Dish Ran Away with the Spoon	N/A	Rudolf Ising	1933	MM
12	Buddy's Day Out	Buddy	Tom Palmer	1933	LT
13	Buddy's Beer Garden	Buddy	Earl Duvall	1933	LT
14	Buddy's Circus	Buddy	Jack King	1934	LT
15	A Cartoonist's Nightmare	Beans	Jack King	1935	LT

=== Special features ===
==== Commentaries ====
- Shuffle Off to Buffalo by Jerry Beck
- A Cartoonist's Nightmare by Jerry Beck

==== The World of Leon Schlesinger ====
- Introduction by Martha Sigall and Jerry Beck
- Crying for the Carolines (1930)
- Haunted Gold title sequence
- Schlesinger Productions Christmas Party with optional commentary by Martha Sigall and Jerry Beck

=== Bonus Shorts ===
#	Title	Director	Year	Series
B1	I Love a Parade	Rudolf Ising	1932	MM
B2	I Like Mountain Music	Rudolf Ising	1933	MM
B3	Sittin' on a Backyard Fence	Earl Duvall	1933	MM
B4	How Do I Know It's Sunday	Friz Freleng	1934	MM

== Disc 4: Most Requested Assorted Nuts and One-Shots ==
#	Title	Director	Year	Series
1	Horton Hatches the Egg	Bob Clampett	1942	MM
2	Lights Fantastic	Friz Freleng	1942	MM
3	Fresh Airedale	Chuck Jones	1945	MM
4	Chow Hound	Chuck Jones	1951	LT
5	The Oily American	Robert McKimson	1954	MM
6	It's Hummer Time	Robert McKimson	1950	LT
7	Rocket-Bye Baby	Chuck Jones	1956	MM
8	Goo Goo Goliath	Friz Freleng	1954	MM
9	Wild Wife	Robert McKimson	1954	MM
10	Much Ado About Nutting	Chuck Jones	1953	MM
11	The Hole Idea	Robert McKimson	1955	LT
12	Now Hear This	Chuck Jones and Maurice Noble	1963	LT
13	Martian Through Georgia	Chuck Jones, Maurice Noble, and Abe Levitow	1962	LT
14	Miss Glory	Tex Avery	1936	MM
15	Norman Normal	Alex Lovy	1968	N/A

=== Special Features ===
==== Commentaries ====
- Fresh Airedale by Greg Ford
- The Hole Idea by Mark Kausler

==== Music-only tracks ====
- The Hole Idea
- Martian Through Georgia

==== Bonus documentary ====
- Mel Blanc: The Man of a Thousand Voices

=== Bonus Shorts ===
#	Title	Director	Year	Series
B1	Sleepy Time Possum	Robert McKimson	1951	MM
B2	Punch Trunk	Chuck Jones	1953	LT
B3	Wild Wild World	Robert McKimson	1960	MM
B4	Bartholomew Versus the Wheel	Robert McKimson	1964	MM

==== Bonus Short - Music-only track ====
- Wild Wild World

==== Bonus Short - Music and Effects track ====
- Punch Trunk

== See also ==
- Looney Tunes and Merrie Melodies filmography
  - Looney Tunes and Merrie Melodies filmography (1929–1939)
  - Looney Tunes and Merrie Melodies filmography (1940–1949)
  - Looney Tunes and Merrie Melodies filmography (1950–1959)
  - Looney Tunes and Merrie Melodies filmography (1960–1969)
  - Looney Tunes and Merrie Melodies filmography (1970–present)
