= Yankee Dood It =

- Title card
- Directed by: Friz Freleng
- Story by: Warren Foster
- Starring: Mel Blanc; Arthur Q. Bryan; Daws Butler
- Edited by: Treg Brown
- Music by: Milt Franklyn
- Animation by: Gerry Chiniquy; Arthur Davis; Virgil Ross
- Layouts by: Hawley Pratt
- Backgrounds by: Irv Wyner
- Production company: Warner Bros. Cartoons
- Distributed by: Warner Bros. Pictures
- Release date: October 13, 1956
- Running time: 7:46
- Language: English

Yankee Dood It is a 1956 Warner Bros. Merrie Melodies theatrical cartoon short directed by Friz Freleng and written by Warren Foster. The short was released on October 13, 1956 and features Elmer Fudd and Sylvester.

The title is a portmanteau on the folk song “Yankee Doodle”, and Red Skelton's "I Dood It" line from the Mean Widdle Kid routine.

Yankee Dood It was the last of three cartoons to be underwritten by the Alfred P. Sloan Foundation, which also underwrote By Word of Mouse and Heir-Conditioned. All three are available on the second disc of Looney Tunes Golden Collection: Volume 6. This cartoon is also one of the few cartoons where Sylvester has no speaking lines (except for "Ah-ha!" and "Sufferin' Succotash").

== Plot ==
The cartoon short is based on the fairy tale The Elves and the Shoemaker, set 150 years after that story took place (in the early 19th century). Elmer Fudd is the progressive King of industrial Elves. He is doing roll call, only to discover that some of his elves are missing. His elf helper tells him that the elves are helping an outmoded shoemaker, but Elmer points out that it is the 20th century. He tells his elf helper to get the elves back or he will mark them AWOL, just before telling the elf helper that if he is turned into a mouse, he must say "Rumpelstiltskin".

At the shop, the elf helper tells the shoemaker that he must take the elves back, but the shoemaker wants to stay in business. Unfortunately, his pet cat, Sylvester, uses the magic word, "Jehoshaphat" to turn Elmer's elf helper into a mouse and chases him around the shoemaker's shop. Saying "Rumpelstiltskin" changes him back to an elf, much to the disgust of Sylvester, who puts the elf helper down. The shoemaker puts Sylvester up so that he cannot interfere. Elmer comes to the shop and explains the role of capitalism and mass production to the shoemaker, who then agrees to use this knowledge to stay in business; he advises the shoemaker to invest his profits back into the business instead of pocketing them for himself. (At the time, marginal income taxes in the United States were over 90% for those in the highest income tax bracket, strongly discouraging business owners from pocketing their profits.)

Four months later, the shoemaker's little shop has literally become a shoe factory. Elmer comes back to see how the shoemaker was "pwogwessing," and the shoemaker says that he has gotten over 500 employees and next month his business will be expanding. This reminds him to come up with a name for his new boot line up, and he comes up with the new name: "Jehoshaphat Boots!" This turns Elmer into a mouse, who forgets that "Rumpelstiltskin" is the magic word, and runs as Sylvester decides to chase him out of the factory and into the distance just as the cartoon ends with Elmer finally saying "Wumpewstiwtskin!"
