= Birth of a Notion (film) =

1947 cartoon by Robert McKimson

- Blue Ribbon title card
- Directed by: Bob Clampett; Robert McKimson
- Story by: Warren Foster
- Starring: Mel Blanc; Stan Freberg
- Music by: Carl Stalling
- Animation by: Richard Bickenbach; Cal Dalton; I. Ellis; Rod Scribner; Anatole Kirsanoff; Fred Abranz
- Layouts by: Cornett Wood
- Backgrounds by: Richard H. Thomas
- Color process: Technicolor
- Production company: Warner Bros. Cartoons
- Distributed by: Warner Bros. Pictures; The Vitaphone Corporation
- Release date: April 12, 1947
- Running time: 7 minutes
- Language: English

Birth of a Notion is a 1947 Warner Bros. Looney Tunes cartoon directed by Bob Clampett and Robert McKimson. The cartoon was released on April 12, 1947, and stars Daffy Duck.

== Plot ==
Daffy, unlike his avian counterparts, declines migration southward for winter and orchestrates his winter stay with Leopold, a credulous dog, by feigning a life-saving act. However, complications arise when confronted with Leopold's master, a scientist fixated on acquiring a duck's wishbone for an experiment.

Daffy's disdain for the scientist's demand leads to a failed assassination endeavor, prompting the scientist to retaliate with lethal traps. Meanwhile, Leopold experiences alienation amidst the chaos. Ultimately, Daffy departs, but the scientist settles for a dog's wishbone, prompting Leopold's departure as well. Daffy's attempt at infiltrating another abode is thwarted by a Joe Besser-esque grey duck, resulting in Daffy's inadvertent flight southward, where he discovers Leopold, equipped with a makeshift flying apparatus, accompanying him.

== Voice Cast ==
- Mel Blanc as Daffy Duck / Leopold the Dog / Joe Besser Duck
- Stan Freberg as Peter Lorre Mad Scientist

== Production notes ==
Director Robert McKimson employs his character design of "Barnyard Dawg" to portray Leopold, the canine companion of the mad scientist, with the scientist himself a visual and vocal caricature of Peter Lorre.

The title, Birth of a Notion, alludes to The Birth of a Nation, though no thematic connection exists between the two films.

This short was initially slated for direction by Bob Clampett, alongside Bacall to Arms and Goofy Gophers, both of which were ultimately completed by Arthur Davis following Clampett's departure from Warner Bros.

== Home media ==
- VHS 1990 - Cartoon Moviestars: Daffy Duck and Company - MGM/UA Home Video
- Laserdisc 1992 - The Golden Age of Looney Tunes: Volume 2 - MGM/UA Home Video
- DVD 2008 - Looney Tunes Golden Collection: Volume 6 (restored) - Warner Home Video
- DVD 2008 - Looney Tunes Spotlight Collection: Volume 6 (restored) - Warner Home Video
- DVD 2013 - Best of Warner Bros: 50 Cartoon Collection - Looney Tunes (restored) - Warner Home Video
- Blu-Ray 2025 - Looney Tunes Collector's Vault: Volume 1 (restored) - Warner Archive Collection
- Blu-Ray 2026 - The Verdict (extra, restored) - Warner Archive Collection

== See also ==
- Daffy Duck filmography
- Looney Tunes and Merrie Melodies filmography (1940–1949)
