= I Like Mountain Music =

1933 film

- Title card
- Directed by: Rudolf Ising
- Produced by: Hugh Harman; Rudolf Ising; Leon Schlesinger
- Starring: Johnny Murray; Rudolf Ising; The King's Men
- Music by: Frank Marsales
- Animation by: Isadore Freleng; Larry Martin
- Color process: Black-and-white
- Production companies: Harman-Ising Productions; Leon Schlesinger Productions
- Distributed by: Warner Bros. Pictures; The Vitaphone Corporation
- Release date: June 14, 1933
- Running time: 7 min
- Country: United States
- Language: English

I Like Mountain Music is a 1933 American animated comedy short film directed by Rudolf Ising. It is the 24th film in the Merrie Melodies series, featuring the title song written by Lew Lehr, Harry Miller and Lew Pollack. The short was released on June 14, 1933.

== Plot ==
At night, a cowboy emerges from a Western magazine after shooting its cover page and encourages his peers to perform the titular song. He dances along a glass display case, accidentally drilling a hole and is sprayed with perfume after falling before climbing up. Characters from other magazines, including National Geographic, emerge and cheer at their performance, some of which join in. A figure skater character skates on a mirror while a cowboy sprinkles fake salt.

Criminals emerge from a crime magazine while pastiches of Sherlock Holmes and Dr. Watson follow, the former acting like a hunting dog. The criminals' leader fashions a flamethrower out of a spray bottle and lighter fluid, cutting a hole in the store's cash register to steal coins. A gunman shoots at them while police officers and soldiers led by Benito Mussolini pursue them. Sailors shoot gumballs, incapacitating two criminals, while the leader is hit by pencil heads and tries to hide in a screenplay headlined by Fay Wray, only to be scared away by the ape Ping Pong (a derivative of King Kong) into a cup under a "raspberry" tap, which actually blows a raspberry at him as humiliation.

== Home media ==
The short was released as an unrestored extra on the Looney Tunes Golden Collection: Volume 6, Disc 3.
