= Lights Fantastic =

1942 film by Isadore Freleng

- Title card
- Directed by: Isadore Freleng
- Story by: Dave Monahan
- Produced by: Leon Schlesinger
- Starring: Mel Blanc
- Music by: Carl W. Stalling
- Animation by: Gil Turner
- Color process: Technicolor
- Production company: Leon Schlesinger Productions
- Distributed by: Warner Bros. Pictures
- Release date: May 23, 1942
- Running time: 6 min
- Country: United States
- Language: English

Lights Fantastic is a 1942 American animated comedy short film directed by Isadore Freleng. It was released on May 23, 1942. It is part of the Merrie Melodies series.

== Plot ==
In New York City, various streetlights illuminate the city while humorously displaying visual gags. A typewriter advertisement "types" its taglines and makes typos. A bus to Chinatown is actually a rickshaw, while stereotypical Chinese people read an ad vertically. An eye examiner's billboard displays an eye test consisting of English letters and apparently small Chinese letters.

A barbershop quartet of stick figures sing for a "Four Noses" ad. A clown advertisement sings. Four cans of coffee dance to the advertisement's music, only to reveal that they have expired. An extremely elaborate set of flower lights light up to reveal a meager "Eat at Joe's" ad. An assortment of advertisement gags are shown, ending with an Egyptian cigarette ad where a man lights his partner's feet with a match as a joke before receiving the cigarettes.

== Home media ==
This short is available on disc 4 of the Looney Tunes Golden Collection: Volume 6 DVD set.
