= Rookie Revue =

1941 film by Isadore Freleng

- Title card
- Directed by: I. Freleng
- Story by: Dave Monahan
- Produced by: Leon Schlesinger
- Music by: Carl W. Stalling
- Animation by: Richard Bickenbach
- Color process: Technicolor
- Production company: Leon Schlesinger Productions
- Distributed by: Warner Bros. Pictures
- Release date: October 25, 1941
- Running time: 7 min
- Country: United States
- Language: English

Rookie Revue is a 1941 American animated comedy short film directed by Isadore Freleng. The cartoon was released on October 25, 1941. It is part of the Merrie Melodies series.

== Plot ==
The film

The film is a series of unrelated gags involving the military.

A bugler soldier snores to the beat of "You're in the Army Now", neglecting his duties, until a cuckoo clock wakes him up to play "Reveille" a jukebox next to his bed to sound the alarm. An idiotic soldier does not recognize his number during counting and treats the question like a reality show.

The mess hall bugler literally shrinks while playing "Mess Call" on his bugle. In the mess hall, infantry soldiers eat like infants until one realizes the audience is watching, causing them to eat properly in embarrassment. Machine gunners eat in quick succession before "reloading" to chew. Bombers eat by throwing food into the air and catching it. The suicide squad are extremely depressed while they eat hash.

Some soldiers ride on horses who march for them. Some soldiers march for long distances, meeting a billboard that reads "Next time try the train" when they run out of energy. Camouflage troops are literally invisible. Artillery troops are trained with a variety of bogus cheap imitations that do not work. A parachute trooper accidentally wears a dud and plunges to his doom. Two fighter planes play tic tac toe with their trails. Machine guns are tested with targets on clouds. A general accidentally bombs himself with an artillery shell.

== Home media ==
This short is available on disc 2 of the Looney Tunes Golden Collection: Volume 6 DVD set.
