= Wild Wild World =

- Title card
- Directed by: Robert McKimson
- Story by: Tedd Pierce
- Starring: Mel Blanc; Daws Butler (uncredited)
- Edited by: Treg Brown
- Music by: Milt Franklyn
- Animation by: George Grandpre; Ted Bonnicksen; Warren Batchelder; Tom Ray
- Layouts by: Robert Gribbroek
- Backgrounds by: William Butler
- Color process: Technicolor
- Distributed by: Warner Bros. Pictures
- Release date: February 27, 1960 (US)
- Running time: 6:05
- Language: English

Wild Wild World is a 1960 Warner Bros. Merrie Melodies cartoon directed by Robert McKimson. The short was released on February 27, 1960.

== Plot ==
Cave Darroway presents a recently discovered "film documentary of the Geo-Goshical Year 75,000,000 B.C.". In the documentary, as three cavemen try to kill a dinosaur, the discovery of fire, transportations, use of the boomerang, entertainment, a haircut, department stores and the use of its elevator are comically shown. Finally the three cavemen from earlier try to kill a dinosaur again, but it shows them a sign that says "Friday (fish day)". They then decide to fish, but are swallowed by the fish.

The documentary ends and Cave Darroway decides to take a coffee break. However, when he gets into an elevator, it turns out that it works like the one seen earlier in the documentary. Namely, the cable is simply cut and the car plummets to the ground, with a sign being shown, "Elevator: Good to the Last Drop," that shakes at the resulting crash.

== Production notes ==
Wild Wild World is a spoof of the 1955-58 television series Wide Wide World, hosted by Dave Garroway. In the cartoon, "Cave Darroway" presents a recently discovered film taken during the Cro-Magnon era. Because of the long lead time in producing an animated cartoon, the television program which inspired the cartoon had already been canceled when the cartoon was released.

== Home media ==
Wild Wild World is available on DVD as a bonus short on Disc 4 of Looney Tunes Golden Collection: Volume 6.
