= The Dish Ran Away with the Spoon =

1933 film by Rudolf Ising

- Title card
- Directed by: Rudolf Ising
- Produced by: Hugh Harman; Rudolf Ising; Leon Schlesinger
- Music by: Frank Marsales
- Animation by: Rollin Hamilton; Bob McKimson
- Color process: Black-and-white
- Production companies: Harman-Ising Productions; Leon Schlesinger Productions
- Distributed by: Warner Bros. Pictures; The Vitaphone Corporation
- Release date: July 29, 1933
- Running time: 7 min
- Country: United States
- Language: English

The Dish Ran Away with the Spoon is a 1933 American animated comedy short film directed by Rudolf Ising. It is the 26th film in the Merrie Melodies series and the penultimate film in the series to be produced by Harman-Ising Productions. The short was released on July 29, 1933.

== Plot ==
The appliances in a bakery come to life. Cutlery swim in the sink to wash themselves by either soaking, diving, a light dip or showering. Plates dry themselves with a toaster after washing. A fork rows a cup on the water, using a mixer to go quicker. A brush plays a piano fashioned of cutlery.

Meanwhile, a dish and a spoon fall in love and imagine having a child. As the spoon plays percussion on various objects, objects including a chick from a broken fertilized egg sing. A dough monster drinks yeast in water to enlarge and attempts to kidnap the dish. The spoon launches cans of ketchup at him, while a grater and popcorn shot from a minigun fashioned from a pot harm the monster. The monster is rolled over then shredded by a fan into baking appliances, including a waffle machine which the spoon steps on to proclaim his victory.

== Reception ==
Tom Bertino noted that the film was one of the lesser films in the Merrie Melodies series due to its lack of unique characters and derived humor.

== Home media ==
The Dish Ran Away with the Spoon is available on disc 3 of the Looney Tunes Golden Collection: Volume 6 DVD set.
