= The Draft Horse =

1942 film by Charles M. Jones

- Title card
- Directed by: Charles M. Jones
- Story by: Ted Pierce
- Produced by: Leon Schlesinger
- Starring: Mel Blanc
- Music by: Carl W. Stalling
- Animation by: Robert Cannon
- Color process: Technicolor
- Production company: Leon Schlesinger Productions
- Distributed by: Warner Bros. Pictures
- Release date: May 9, 1942
- Running time: 7:39
- Country: United States
- Language: English

The Draft Horse is a 1942 American animated comedy short film directed by Charles M. Jones. The cartoon was released on May 9, 1942. It is part of the Merrie Melodies series.

== Plot ==
A farm horse sees a poster that says the U.S. Army needs horses. The horse goes to the recruiting station and tries to volunteer, but is eventually rejected, labeled "44-F". Leaving the station dejected, he wanders into a wargames situation, and the flying bullets frighten him so much he makes a dash for home. At the end, he is serving the war effort in another way, knitting "V for Victory" sweaters for the soldiers overseas.

== Home media ==
The Draft Horse is available uncut on Looney Tunes Golden Collection: Volume 6, Disc 2.

== See also ==
- Horses in warfare
- List of films about horses
- Looney Tunes and Merrie Melodies filmography (1940–1949)
