= How Do I Know It's Sunday =

1934 film by Isadore Freleng

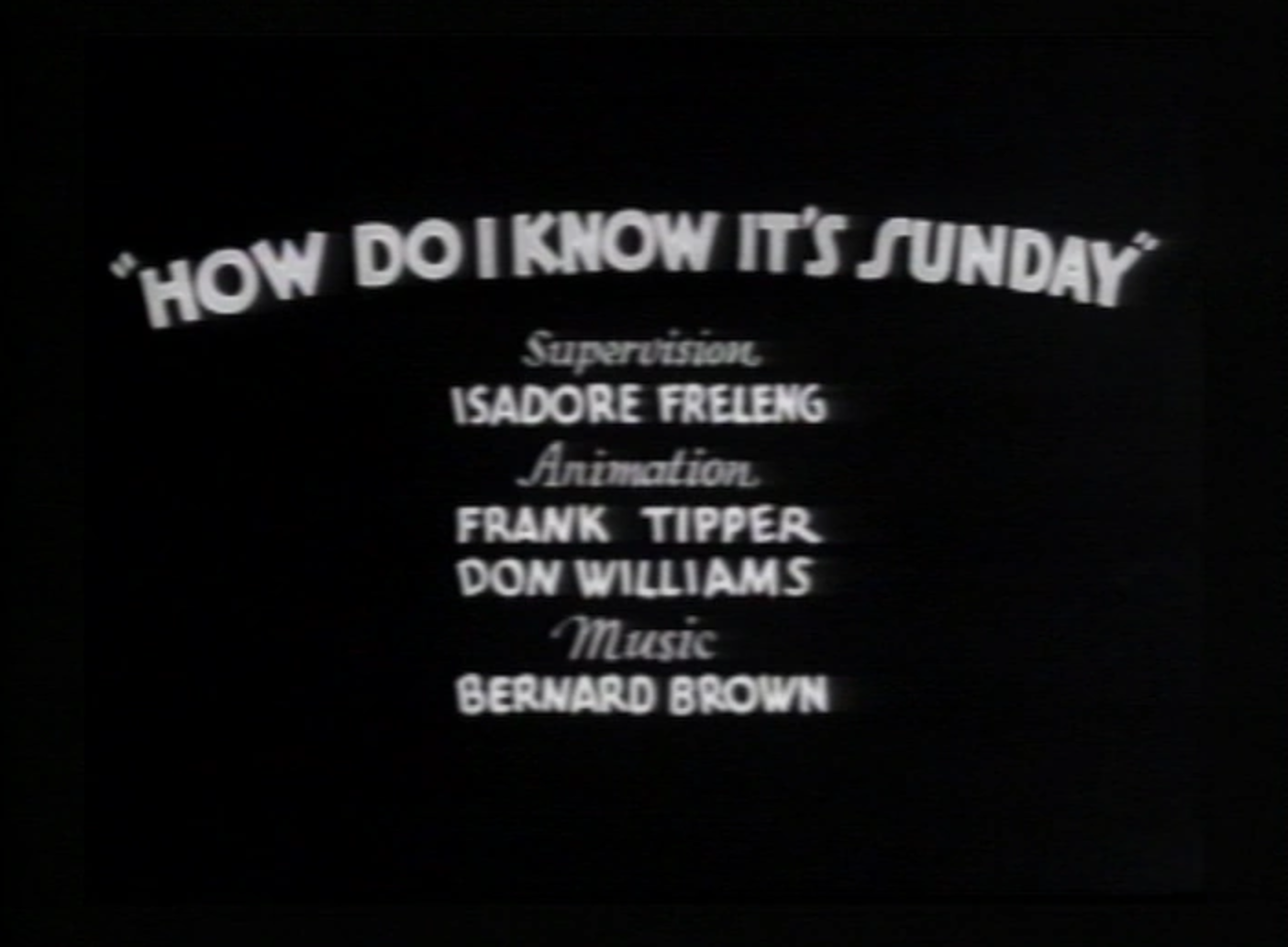
- Title card
- Directed by: Isadore Freleng
- Produced by: Leon Schlesinger
- Music by: Bernard Brown
- Animation by: Frank Tipper; Don Williams
- Color process: Black and white
- Production company: Leon Schlesinger Productions
- Distributed by: Warner Bros. Pictures; The Vitaphone Corporation
- Release date: June 9, 1934
- Running time: 7 min
- Country: United States
- Language: English

How Do I Know It's Sunday is a 1934 American animated comedy short film directed by Isadore Freleng. It was originally released on June 9, 1934. It is the 35th film in the Merrie Melodies series, featuring the titular song from the film Harold Teen.

== Plot ==
On a Sunday morning, everyone in town goes to church, including the owner of a general store who closes shop for the day. Various foods and mascots come to life and sing and dance to the titular song. The gags become more absurd as they occur, including children mascots of multiple nationalities playing on the ceiling fan, only to be spun rapidly by the Devil, threaded wheat being used as rain, as well as an Inuit boy mascot fishing from a sink on another can, only for the fish to fall into a cup of coffee. Two firemen boy mascots on a biscuit can flirt and sing with two schoolgirl mascots on salt cans.

The Inuit boy goes out with a female cookie. A large number of flies quickly devour a beef Wellington as well as biting numerous foods. They find the female cookie and abducts her, only to be kicked by the Inuit boy. The mascots hide them and engage in all out warfare with the flies. The mascots attack with bug spray and popcorn, while the flies retaliate with toothpicks shot from safety pins. The flies use matches to burn the mascots' fortress, which is then put out by a fireman boy mascot, as well as by a pickle using brandy (which nonsensically works). Spraying garo syrup causes some flies to stick together, allowing popcorn to stick on them as they end up in a box of popcorn balls. The Inuit boy then uses a mixer to trick the flies into entering an empty bottle, thwarting one last escape attempt by a stray fly, succeeding in containing them as the mascots cheer.

== Home media ==
This short is available as an unrestored extra on disc 3 of the Looney Tunes Golden Collection: Volume 6 DVD set.
