= Rabbit Rampage =

1955 short film by Chuck Jones

- Title card
- Directed by: Charles M. Jones
- Story by: Michael Maltese
- Starring: Mel Blanc
- Music by: Milt Franklyn
- Animation by: Ben Washam
- Layouts by: Ernest Nordli
- Backgrounds by: Philip De Guard
- Color process: Technicolor
- Production company: Warner Bros. Cartoons
- Distributed by: Warner Bros. Pictures; The Vitaphone Corporation
- Release date: June 11, 1955 (U.S.)
- Running time: 6:58
- Language: English

Rabbit Rampage is a 1955 Warner Bros. Looney Tunes animated cartoon, directed by Chuck Jones. The short was released on June 11, 1955, and stars Bugs Bunny.

== Plot ==
The short opens to Bugs Bunny's hole being drawn by the animator in the ground; the animator abruptly erases and redraws the hole in the sky. A sleepy Bugs climbs out and falls to the ground. When Bugs realizes who is in charge of the feature, he makes his desire plain to not be a victim of an animator who plans on making him look bad. With that said, Bugs is about to get back into his rabbit hole, but the animator erases it, causing Bugs to jump headfirst into the ground. After Bugs stands up, he restates his desire to not work with the animator, who paints a yellow streak on Bugs' back, implying that Bugs is a coward. Bugs then grabs the brush and breaks it in half.

Bugs emphatically states he will report the animator to Warner Bros. and calls the animator "a menace to society", while the animator draws a picket sign ("I won't work") in Bugs's left hand. When Bugs sees the sign, he panics, and throws it on the ground, off-screen. Bugs asks if the animator is trying to get him fired, before explaining that he has become a good asset to the studio, which gives the animator time to draw another picket sign ("I refuse to live up to my contract"). After panicking and throwing away the last sign off-screen, Bugs returns, wiping off the yellow paint with a towel. Afterwards, Bugs grudgingly agrees to work on the picture, but pauses once he sees the animator has drawn a hat on his head, prompting Bugs to throw it on the ground, stating the animator knows he is not supposed to wear a hat. In response, the animator draws a big pink women's hat, and Bugs throws it on the ground too, revealing another hat beneath it, with another hat revealed under that one when Bugs throws it on the ground as well. The cycle continues with various ridiculous hats and wigs until Bugs announces that he gives up, after which he finally gets the endless line of hats off his head and walks away. The animator draws a rotated forest, and finding himself in it, Bugs tries to get in his hole by climbing down a nearby tree. The animator draws an anvil on Bugs' tail, causing Bugs to fall onto a road, before rolling into an empty area.

Angry, Bugs incoherently yells at the animator, which the animator responds to by erasing Bugs's head. When Bugs realizes this, he taps one foot impatiently and points at the spot where his head used to be. The animator then draws a jack-o'-lantern on Bugs' body. Realizing this, Bugs demands it be corrected, which the animator supplies by simply adding rabbit ears to the existing head, infuriating Bugs even further. The animator erases the pumpkin head and then draws a tiny version of Bugs' head. Bugs does not realize what has happened until he pulls a carrot out of his pocket, stopping short when he sees that something else is wrong and that the carrot is now huge. He then takes notice of his high-pitched voice. He smacks his hand against his face and realizes that his head is now small. He angrily requests that the animator draw his head back in properly, which he does, except he does not apply the ears. Bugs requests the ears, to which the animator puts in human ears. Bugs requests that he has long rabbit ears, to which the animator then draws long, droopy rabbit ears, only to revert them back when Bugs snaps at him to not "be so danged literal!"

Now with his ears back, Bugs walks away again, only to have his tail erased. When Bugs orders that his tail be put back, it is replaced with a horse's tail, and when Bugs states a horse's tail belongs on a horse, the animator erases Bugs's body and redraws him as a horse. Bugs, while standing on two hind legs and eating a carrot, points out to the animator that this misinterpretation will not make his employers happy, seeing that his contract clearly says he is to be drawn as a rabbit, allowing the animator to pretend to comply with what Bugs is telling him by erasing Bugs' horse body and redrawing him as a more abstract, simplified rabbit with big cheeks and feet. Bugs warns the animator that this latest bit of teasing can lead to serious consequences for both of them, which leads the animator to draw him back to normal.

When Bugs sardonically asks the animator if he wants to paint him into a grasshopper, the animator takes out a brush and Bugs quickly takes it back. Bugs attempts to make friends with the animator, promising that they could do something popular. While he is doing this, the animator draws two clones of Bugs, prompting Bugs to shove the clones out of the picture. As Bugs states he has finally had enough and he will not leave the spot until the animator gets the boss, the animator paints Bugs on a railroad track with a train coming out of a tunnel behind him. Bugs leans on a rock to avoid the train as it passes by, and he says he still knows one way out and that the animator cannot stop him. He jumps up and pulls down a card with the words "The End."

The camera pulls back to the animator, who is revealed to be Elmer Fudd, in a cameo appearance, who laughs and states his delight to the audience by saying, "Well anyway, I finally got even with that scwewy wabbit!"

== Voice cast ==
- Mel Blanc – Bugs Bunny
- Arthur Q. Bryan – Elmer Fudd (uncredited)

== Additional crew ==
- Film Editor: Treg Brown
- Additional Story: Chuck Jones, Tedd Pierce
- Animation: Ken Harris

== Production notes ==
Rabbit Rampage is a spiritual successor to the 1953 cartoon Duck Amuck, in which Daffy Duck was teased by an off-screen animator, revealed at the end to be Bugs Bunny. In Rabbit Rampage, Bugs is similarly teased by another off-screen animator, who is revealed at the end to be Elmer Fudd.

The cartoon inspired a 1993 video game for the Super NES, Bugs Bunny Rabbit Rampage, which allows the player to control Bugs, following a similar plot.

== Home media ==
A few clips from this short were shown in a trailer for the Looney Tunes Golden Collection: Volume 1 DVD set (seen on the Looney Tunes: Back in Action DVD), but was not included as part of that set. The complete short was first released on the Volume 6 set of the series as a "bonus" cartoon. It was later released on the Looney Tunes Collector's Choice: Volume 2 Blu-ray.

== Legacy ==
While not as a big a success as Duck Amuck, the short has been fairly popular. A similar plot was also included in the episode "Duck's Reflucks" of Baby Looney Tunes, in which Bugs was the victim, Daffy was the animator, and it was made on a computer instead of a pencil and paper. It is done once again with Daffy tormenting Bugs in the New Looney Tunes episode "One Carroter in Search of an Artist", with the technology updated and the pencil and paintbrush replaced by a digital pen.

In issue #94 of the Looney Tunes comic (November 2002), Bugs Bunny gets back at Daffy Duck by making him the victim, in switching various movie roles, from Duck Twacy in Who Killed Daffy Duck," a video game character, and a talk show host, and they always wind up with Daffy starring in Moby Dick (the story's running gag). After this, Bugs comments, "Eh, dis guy needs a new agent."

== See also ==
- Looney Tunes and Merrie Melodies filmography (1950–1959)
- List of Bugs Bunny cartoons
- List of cartoons featuring Elmer Fudd

Preceded by Hare Brush	Bugs Bunny Cartoons; 1955	Succeeded by This Is a Life?
