= Heir-Conditioned =

- Title card
- Directed by: Friz Freleng
- Story by: Warren Foster
- Starring: Mel Blanc; Arthur Q. Bryan; Daws Butler; Stan Freberg
- Music by: Milt Franklyn
- Animation by: Gerry Chiniquy; Arthur Davis; Virgil Ross
- Layouts by: Hawley Pratt
- Backgrounds by: Irv Wyner
- Color process: Technicolor
- Production company: Warner Bros. Cartoons
- Distributed by: Warner Bros. Pictures
- Release date: November 26, 1955 (US)
- Running time: 7:23
- Language: English

Heir-Conditioned is a Warner Bros. Looney Tunes theatrical cartoon short directed by Friz Freleng and written by Warren Foster. The short was released on November 26, 1955, and features Elmer Fudd and Sylvester.

Heir-Conditioned is the second of three Looney Tunes shorts underwritten by the Alfred P. Sloan Foundation (the first being By Word of Mouse).

== Plot ==
The story begins with Sylvester finding himself the heir of his mistress' vast fortune. While his financial adviser, Elmer Fudd, is urging him to invest his money, Sylvester is frightened he will simply lose his money. Meanwhile, his street cat friends are out to get the money for themselves, but Fudd manages to thwart each attempt, including the one from Charlie, a cat who pretends to be a salesman for a "silver cleaning liquid" of the Hi-Ho Silver Cleaning Company of Walla Walla, Washington.

Finally, Fudd manages an extensive lecture on the benefits of good investment on the economy with an educational film to illustrate the point. While Sylvester is not convinced, the cats outside see the film themselves and are persuaded to the point when Sylvester manages to get the money to them, they demand he give it over to Elmer for investment. A defeated Sylvester gives in and growls to the portrait of his mistress that his life would have been less complicated if she took her money with her.

== Voices ==
- Mel Blanc as Sylvester, Charlie the Fast-talking Sales-cat, Additional Cats, Tweety.
- Daws Butler as Bernie the Cat
- Stan Freberg as Gus the Cat, Additional Cats.
- Arthur Q. Bryan as Elmer Fudd

== Home media ==
Heir-Conditioned is available on disc 2 of the Looney Tunes Golden Collection: Volume 6 DVD set.
