= We're in the Money (1933 film) =

1933 film by Rudolf Ising

- Title card
- Directed by: Rudolf Ising
- Produced by: Hugh Harman; Rudolf Ising; Leon Schlesinger
- Music by: Frank Marsales
- Animation by: Isadore Freleng; Larry Martin
- Color process: Black-and-white
- Production companies: Harman-Ising Productions; Leon Schlesinger Productions
- Distributed by: Warner Bros. Pictures; The Vitaphone Corporation
- Release date: August 19, 1933
- Running time: 7 min
- Country: United States
- Language: English

We're in the Money is a 1933 American animated comedy short film directed by Rudolf Ising. It is the 27th film in the Merrie Melodies series and the final film in the series to be produced by Harman-Ising Productions. It was released on August 19, 1933.

== Plot ==
A toy store owner leaves for the night. A toy soldier alerts the other toys, who all come to life and play with the musical instruments scattered around the store. The toy soldier conducts a jazz piece played by the toys, who sing the titular song. The money in the cash register also join in. A dummy dances to the song and by looking in the mirror, mirrors his voice to three reflections which form a barbershop quartet. He plays the piece on numerous pianos while dancing. He ends up crashing into a shelf of shoe boxes while playing the trombone.

== Home media ==
We're in the Money is available on disc 3 of the Looney Tunes Golden Collection: Volume 6 DVD set.
