= Cartoon Alley =

American animated TV series

- Starring: Ben Mankiewicz
- Country of origin: United States
- No. of episodes: 47

Production
- Running time: 30 minutes

Original release
- Network: Turner Classic Movies
- Release: November 5, 2004 – January 27, 2007

Cartoon Alley is an American animated children's animated anthology series which aired on Turner Classic Movies on Saturday mornings from 2004 to 2007. It featured classic animated shorts.

Originally broadcast at 11:30 AM ET, it was hosted by Ben Mankiewicz and usually featured three classic animated shorts from the 1930–1950s per episode. Most shorts were from The Golden Age of American animation. Each of the three shorts focused on a common theme. Most shorts came from Warner Bros., MGM, Paramount (the latter studio provided the Popeye cartoons; these were in Turner's hands by this point), but during the show's first season Cartoon Alley featured shorts from Gaumont. Many recognizable characters were featured in at least one episode such as Bugs Bunny, Popeye, Porky Pig, Tom and Jerry, Droopy, Screwy Squirrel, Barney Bear, Spike, George and Junior, and others not so famous such as Goopy Geer and The Captain and the Kids. Also included were animated feature films. The shorts often appeared uncut and uncensored (a few cartoons utilized cuts for content), and the more controversial cartoons (such as Hiawatha's Rabbit Hunt and Half-Pint Pygmy) were often introduced with a brief warning by Mankiewicz about the ethnic stereotypes being portrayed. The network's logo was only featured for a brief time, usually during the last short featured.

From November 2004 to July 2005, the series was featured just once a month but after popular demand the series became a weekly feature in September. Cartoon Alley usually did not air in February because of TCM's 31 Days of Oscar programming. The series was cancelled in the autumn of 2007.

== Episode list ==
=== Season 1 (2004–2005) ===
| # | Episode Title | Shorts Featured | Original Air Date |
|---|---|---|---|
| 1 | Clark Gable | The Coo-Coo Nut Grove; Malibu Beach Party; Hollywood Steps Out | 11/5/2004 |
| 2 | Christmas | The Pups' Christmas; Peace on Earth; Night Before Christmas | 12/4/2004 |
| 3 | Oscar Nominated Shorts | Blitz Wolf; Life with Feathers; Hatch Up Your Troubles | 1/1/2005 |
| 4 | Tom & Jerry | Professor Tom; Old Rockin' Chair Tom; The Cat Concerto | 3/5/2005 |
| 5 | Tex Avery | Red Hot Riding Hood; Batty Baseball; Swing Shift Cinderella | 4/2/2005 |
| 6 | The Early Days of Warner Brothers Cartoons | Honeymoon Hotel; Beauty and the Beast; I Haven't Got a Hat | 5/7/2005 |
| 7 | The Captain and the Kids | Cleaning House; Petunia National Park; Mama's New Hat | 6/4/2005 |
| 8 | Popeye | Adventures of Popeye; The Anvil Chorus Girl; Abusement Park | 7/2/2005 |
| 9 | Animaland Series (1) | The Platypus; The Cuckoo; The Lion | 9/3/2005 |
| 10 | Animaland Series (2) | The Ostrich; It's A Lovely Day; The House Cat | 9/10/2005 |
| 11 | Animaland Series (3) | Ginger Nutt's Bee Bother; Ginger Nutt's Christmas Circus; Ginger Nutt's Forest Dragon | 9/17/2005 |
| 12 | Barney Bear | The Bear That Couldn't Sleep; Goggle Fishing Bear; Heir Bear | 9/24/2005 |
| 13 | Sniffles | Naughty But Mice; Little Brother Rat; Sniffles and the Bookworm | 10/1/2005 |
| 14 | Droopy | Dumb-Hounded; The Shooting of Dan McGoo; Wild and Woolfy | 10/8/2005 |
| 15 | Tweety Bird | A Tale of Two Kitties; Birdy and the Beast; A Gruesome Twosome | 10/15/2005 |
| 16 | Cinemascope Cartoons | Millionaire Droopy; The Egg and Jerry; Tops with Pops | 10/22/2005 |
| 17 | Peter Lorre Caricatures | Horton Hatches the Egg; Hair-Raising Hare; Birth of a Notion | 10/29/2005 |

=== Season 2 (2005–2006) ===
| # | Episode Title | Shorts Featured | Original Air Date |
|---|---|---|---|
| 18 | Happy Harmonies | The Discontented Canary; The Old Pioneer; Tale of Vienna Woods | 11/5/2005 |
| 19 | Elmer Fudd | Elmer's Candid Camera; Confederate Honey; The Hardship of Miles Standish | 11/12/2005 |
| 20 | Benny Burro | Little Gravel Voice; The Prospecting Bear; Half-Pint Palomino | 11/19/2005 |
| 21 | WB Cartoon Character Debuts | Walky Talky Hawky; Goofy Gophers; Haredevil Hare | 11/26/2005 |
| 22 | Popeye II | Baby Wants a Bottleship; A Balmy Swami; Beaus Will Be Beaus | 12/3/2005 |
| 23 | Two Curious Puppies | Dog Gone Modern; The Curious Puppy; Snowtime For Comedy | 12/10/2005 |
| 24 | Christmas II | The Shanty Where Santy Claus Lives; Bedtime for Sniffles; Good Will To Men | 12/17/2005 |
| 25 | Nursery Rhymes and Bedtime Stories | Little Red Walking Hood; The Bear's Tale; The Trial of Mr. Wolf | 12/31/2005 |
| 26 | Homer the Flea | The Homeless Flea; What Price Fleadom; The Cat That Hated People | 9/2/2006 |
| 27 | Black and White Warner Brothers | I've Got to Sing a Torch Song; Pettin' in the Park; Gold Diggers of '49 | 9/9/2006 |
| 28 | Tex Avery's Screwball Classics | Lucky Ducky; Bad Luck Blackie; Symphony in Slang | 9/16/2006 |
| 29 | Hubie & Bertie | Aristo-Cat; Roughly Squeaking; House Hunting Mice | 9/23/2006 |
| 30 | Popeye III | Can You Take It; Child Psykolojiky; Car-azy Drivers | 9/23/2006 |
| 31 | Warner Brothers | Egghead Rides Again; The Bashful Buzzard; Boulevardier from the Bronx | 10/7/2006 |
| 32 | CinemaScope Tom & Jerry | Mucho Mouse; Tom's Photo Finish; Royal Cat Nap | 10/14/2006 |
| 33 | CinemaScope Droopy | Blackboard Jumble; One Droopy Knight; Sheep Wrecked | 10/21/2006 |
| 34 | Conrad Cat | The Bird Came C.O.D; Porky's Café; Conrad the Sailor | 10/28/2006 |

=== Season 3 (2006–2007) ===
| # | Episode Title | Shorts Featured | Original Air Date |
|---|---|---|---|
| 35 | George and Junior | Henpecked Hoboes; Hound Hunters; Half-Pint Pygmy | 11/4/2006 |
| 36 | Early Bugs Bunny | A Wild Hare; Elmer's Pet Rabbit; Hiawatha's Rabbit Hunt | 11/11/2006 |
| 37 | Spike | The Counterfeit Cat; Ventriloquist Cat; Garden Gopher | 11/18/2006 |
| 38 | Bugs And Cecil | Tortoise Beats Hare; Tortoise Wins By a Hare; Rabbit Transit | 11/25/2006 |
| 39 | Happy Harmonies II | When the Cat's Away; The Lost Chick; The Calico Dragon | 12/2/2006 |
| 40 | Porky Pig | Porky's Picnic; Porky's Baseball Broadcast; Porky's Snooze Reel | 12/9/2006 |
| 41 | Bing Crosby Spoofs | Let It Be Me; Bingo Crosbyana; The Woods Are Full of Cuckoos | 12/16/2006 |
| 42 | Christmas III | Toyland Broadcast; Alias St. Nick; Captain's Christmas | 12/23/2006 |
| 43 | Goopy Geer | Goopy Geer; Moonlight for Two; The Queen Was in the Parlor | 12/30/2006 |
| 44 | The Bear Family | Goldilocks and the Three Bears; A Rainy Day; Papa Gets the Bird | 1/6/2007 |
| 45 | Beans | The Fire Alarm; The Phantom Ship; Boom Boom | 1/13/2007 |
| 46 | Adolph Hitler WB Caricatures | Daffy – The Commando; Russian Rhapsody; Herr Meets Hare | 1/20/2007 |
| 47 | Screwy Squirrel | Screwball Squirrel; The Screwy Truant; Lonesome Lenny | 1/27/2007 |

== Featured directors ==
These people directed original shorts featured in the series.

- Tex Avery
- Joseph Barbera
- Robert Clampett
- Arthur Davis
- Earl Duvall
- David Hand (Animalland)
- Max Fleischer
- Dave Fleischer
- Friz Freleng
- William Hanna
- Hugh Harman
- Rudolph Ising
- Chuck Jones
- Seymour Kneitel
- Dick Lundy
- Robert McKimson
- Isadore Sparber

== See also ==
- The Tex Avery Show
- ToonHeads
- The Bob Clampett Show
- The Popeye Show
- Toon In with Me
