= Looney Tunes Platinum Collection: Volume 2 =

2012 American cartoon anthology

- DVD cover
- Directed by: Chuck Jones, Bob Clampett, Friz Freleng, Robert McKimson, Tex Avery, Arthur Davis, Ben Hardaway, Cal Dalton
- Produced by: Leon Schlesinger, Eddie Selzer, John W. Burton, Fred Quimby (Disc 3 only)
- Starring: voice of Mel Blanc
- Music by: Norman Spencer; Carl Stalling; Milt Franklyn; Scott Bradley (in Disc 3, Special features)
- Distributed by: Warner Home Video
- Release date: October 16, 2012
- Country: United States
- Language: English

Looney Tunes Platinum Collection: Volume 2 is a Blu-ray and DVD box set by Warner Home Video released on October 16, 2012. It contains 50 Looney Tunes and Merrie Melodies cartoons and numerous supplements. Disc 3 is exclusive to the Blu-ray version of the set. Unlike Volume 1, which was released in a digibook, Volume 2 was released in a standard one-movie case. This release was followed by Looney Tunes Platinum Collection: Volume 3.

Of the 50 cartoons included, forty were previously restored as part of the Looney Tunes Golden Collection, the Warner Bros. Home Entertainment Academy Awards Animation Collection, or a Looney Tunes Super Stars DVD. The other ten cartoons — What Makes Daffy Duck, Birdy and the Beast, Home, Tweet Home, The High and the Flighty, Porky's Hare Hunt, Hare-um Scare-um, Prest-O Change-O, The Lion's Busy, Strife with Father, and A Horse Fly Fleas — are new to Blu-ray and DVD.

In June 2025, after being out of print for several years, Warner Bros. Home Entertainment put the Blu-Ray version of Platinum Collection: Volume 2 back into print without the booklet, but containing all three discs.

== Disc 1 ==
#	Title	Characters	Year	Director	Series
1	A Wild Hare	Bugs, Elmer	1940	Tex Avery	MM
2	Buckaroo Bugs	Bugs	1944	Bob Clampett	LT
3	Long-Haired Hare	Bugs	1949	Chuck Jones	LT
4	Ali Baba Bunny	Bugs, Daffy	1957	Chuck Jones	MM
5	Show Biz Bugs	Bugs, Daffy	1957	Friz Freleng	LT
6	The Wise Quacking Duck	Daffy	1943	Bob Clampett	LT
7	What Makes Daffy Duck (Note: New to Blu-ray and DVD.)	Daffy, Elmer	1948	Arthur Davis	LT
8	Book Revue	Daffy	1946	Bob Clampett	LT
9	Deduce, You Say!	Daffy, Porky	1956	Chuck Jones	LT
10	Porky in Wackyland	Porky	1938	Bob Clampett	LT
11	You Ought to Be in Pictures	Daffy, Porky	1940	Friz Freleng	LT
12	Porky in Egypt	Porky	1938	Bob Clampett	LT
13	Back Alley Oproar	Elmer, Sylvester	1948	Friz Freleng	MM
14	Little Red Rodent Hood	Sylvester	1952	Friz Freleng	MM
15	Canned Feud	Sylvester	1951	Friz Freleng	LT
16	Gift Wrapped	Sylvester, Tweety, Granny	1952	Friz Freleng	LT
17	Birdy and the Beast	Tweety	1944	Bob Clampett	MM
18	Home, Tweet Home	Sylvester, Tweety	1950	Friz Freleng	MM
19	Going! Going! Gosh!	Wile E. Coyote and the Road Runner	1952	Chuck Jones	MM
20	Zipping Along	Wile E. Coyote and the Road Runner	1953	Chuck Jones	MM
21	Scent-imental Romeo	Penelope, Pepé	1951	Chuck Jones	MM
22	The Foghorn Leghorn	Foghorn, Henery, Barnyard	1948	Robert McKimson	MM
23	The High and the Flighty	Foghorn, Daffy, Barnyard	1956	Robert McKimson	MM
24	Tabasco Road	Speedy	1957	Robert McKimson	LT
25	Mexicali Shmoes	Speedy	1959	Friz Freleng	LT

=== Special features ===
==== Behind the Tunes ====
- Man from Wackyland: The Art of Bob Clampett
- Bosko, Buddy, and the Best of Black and White
- Leon Schlesinger: The Merrie Cartoon Mogul (provided in HD)

==== Alternate audio tracks ====
- Audio commentaries
  - Michael Barrier on Buckaroo Bugs, Long-Haired Hare, Book Revue, Porky in Wackyland and The Foghorn Leghorn
  - Eddie Fitzgerald, John Kricfalusi, and Kali Fontecchio on Buckaroo Bugs
  - Greg Ford on A Wild Hare, Ali Baba Bunny, Show Biz Bugs (with pre-score music), Back Alley Oproar, Scent-imental Romeo and The High and the Flighty
  - Jerry Beck on You Ought to Be in Pictures, Canned Feud, Tabasco Road and Mexicali Shmoes
  - Mark Kausler on Porky in Egypt and Birdy and the Beast
  - Constantine Nasr on Deduce, You Say!
- Music-only tracks include: Ali Baba Bunny, The High and the Flighty, Tabasco Road and Mexicali Shmoes
- Music-and-effects tracks include: Scent-imental Romeo

== Disc 2 ==
#	Title	Characters	Year	Director	Series
1	Wabbit Twouble	Bugs, Elmer	1941	Bob Clampett	MM
2	Rabbit Fire	Bugs, Daffy, Elmer	1951	Chuck Jones	LT
3	Rabbit Seasoning	Bugs, Daffy, Elmer	1952	Chuck Jones	MM
4	Duck! Rabbit, Duck!	Bugs, Daffy, Elmer	1953	Chuck Jones	MM
5	Drip-Along Daffy	Daffy, Porky, Nasty Canasta	1951	Chuck Jones	MM
6	My Little Duckaroo	Daffy, Porky, Nasty Canasta	1954	Chuck Jones	MM
7	Barbary Coast Bunny	Bugs, Nasty Canasta	1956	Chuck Jones	LT
8	Tortoise Beats Hare	Bugs, Cecil	1941	Tex Avery	MM
9	Tortoise Wins by a Hare	Bugs, Cecil	1943	Bob Clampett	MM
10	Rabbit Transit	Bugs, Cecil	1947	Friz Freleng	LT
11	Porky's Hare Hunt	Porky, Proto-Bugs	1938	Ben Hardaway	LT
12	Hare-um Scare-um	Proto-Bugs	1939	Ben Hardaway, Cal Dalton	MM
13	Prest-O Change-O	Two Curious Puppies, Proto-Bugs	1939	Chuck Jones	MM
14	Elmer's Candid Camera	Elmer, Proto-Bugs	1940	Chuck Jones	MM
15	Bugs Bunny Gets the Boid	Bugs, Beaky	1942	Bob Clampett	MM
16	The Bashful Buzzard	Beaky	1945	Bob Clampett	LT
17	The Lion's Busy	Beaky	1950	Friz Freleng	LT
18	Strife with Father	Beaky	1950	Robert McKimson	MM
19	An Itch in Time	A. Flea, Elmer, Willoughby	1943	Bob Clampett	MM
20	A Horse Fly Fleas	A. Flea	1947	Robert McKimson	LT
21	Hollywood Steps Out		1941	Tex Avery	MM
22	Miss Glory		1936	Tex Avery	MM
23	Rocket-Bye Baby		1956	Chuck Jones	MM
24	Russian Rhapsody		1944	Bob Clampett	MM
25	Dough Ray Me-ow		1948	Arthur Davis	MM

=== Special features ===
==== Behind the Tunes ====
- Forever Befuddled
- A-Hunting We Will Go: Chuck Jones' Wabbit Season Twilogy
- Looney Tunes Go Hollywood
- A Conversation with Tex Avery
- Looney Tunes Go to War!

==== Alternate audio tracks ====
- Audio commentaries
  - Michael Barrier on Wabbit Twouble, Rabbit Seasoning, Drip-Along Daffy, Tortoise Beats Hare and Bugs Bunny Gets the Boid
  - Greg Ford on Rabbit Fire and Hollywood Steps Out
  - Eric Goldberg on Duck! Rabbit, Duck!
  - Chuck Jones on Tortoise Beats Hare
  - Mark Kausler on Tortoise Wins by a Hare and Russian Rhapsody
  - Jerry Beck on Porky's Hare Hunt, Elmer's Candid Camera and Dough Ray Me-Ow
  - Paul Dini on The Bashful Buzzard
  - John Kricfalusi and Bill Melendez on An Itch in Time
  - Will Friedwald on Page Miss Glory
  - Constantine Nasr on Rocket-bye Baby
- Music-only tracks include: Rabbit Fire, Rabbit Seasoning, Drip-Along Daffy, Barbary Coast Bunny
- Music-and-effects tracks include: Duck! Rabbit, Duck!

== Disc 3: Bonus Materials ==
- King-Size Comedy: Tex Avery and the Looney Tunes Revolution
- Tex Avery, the King of Cartoons
- Friz on Film
- ToonHeads: The Lost Cartoons
- Real American Zero: The Adventures of Private Snafu
- The World of Leon Schlesinger
  - Bosko, the Talk-Ink Kid (1929)
  - Sinkin' in the Bathtub (1930)
  - Crying for the Carolines (1930)
  - It's Got Me Again! (1932)
  - Haunted Gold title sequence
  - Schlesinger Productions Christmas Party with optional commentary by Martha Sigall and Jerry Beck
- Friz at MGM - Captain and the Kids cartoons
  - Poultry Pirates (1938)
  - A Day at the Beach (1938)
  - The Captain’s Christmas (1938)
  - Seal Skinners (1939)
  - Mama's New Hat (1939)
- The Best of the Rest of Tex - a selection of Tex Avery's best cartoons from MGM
  - Blitz Wolf (1942)
  - Red Hot Riding Hood (1943)
  - Screwball Squirrel (1944)
  - Swing Shift Cinderella (1945)
  - King-Size Canary (1947)
  - Bad Luck Blackie (1949)
  - Señor Droopy (1949)
  - Wags to Riches (1949)
  - Symphony in Slang (1951)
  - Magical Maestro (1952)
  - Rock-a-Bye Bear (1952)
- Private Snafu cartoons
  - Coming!! Snafu (1943)
  - Gripes (1943)
  - Spies (1943)
  - The Goldbrick (1943)
  - The Home Front (1943)
  - Rumors (1943)
  - Snafuperman (1944)
  - Censored (1944)
- Mr. Hook cartoons
  - The Good Egg (1945)
  - The Return of Mr. Hook (1945)
  - Tokyo Woes (1945)

== See also ==
- Looney Tunes Golden Collection
- Looney Tunes and Merrie Melodies filmography
  - Looney Tunes and Merrie Melodies filmography (1930–1939)
  - Looney Tunes and Merrie Melodies filmography (1940–1949)
  - Looney Tunes and Merrie Melodies filmography (1950–1959)
  - Looney Tunes and Merrie Melodies filmography (1960–1969)
  - Looney Tunes and Merrie Melodies filmography (1970–present)
