= What Makes Daffy Duck =

- Directed by: Arthur Davis
- Story by: Lloyd Turner; Bill Scott
- Starring: Mel Blanc
- Music by: Carl Stalling
- Animation by: Emery Hawkins; J.C. Melendez; Basil Davidovich; Don Williams
- Layouts by: Don Smith
- Backgrounds by: Philip DeGuard
- Color process: Cinecolor
- Production company: Warner Bros. Cartoons
- Distributed by: Warner Bros. Pictures; The Vitaphone Corporation
- Release date: February 14, 1948
- Running time: 7 minutes
- Language: English

What Makes Daffy Duck is a 1948 Warner Bros. Looney Tunes cartoon directed by Arthur Davis. The cartoon was released on February 14, 1948, and stars Daffy Duck and Elmer Fudd.

The title is a play on Budd Schulberg's 1941 novel What Makes Sammy Run?

== Plot ==
Daffy Duck finds himself in a perilous situation during duck hunting season and employs his cunning to outsmart both Elmer Fudd and a fox named Fortescue. Daffy tricks them into competing against each other for his capture, leading to comical mishaps. Despite several close encounters with danger, Daffy manages to turn the tables on both Elmer and the fox using clever schemes and manipulation.

In the chaos that ensues, Daffy orchestrates a series of events that pit Elmer and the fox against each other, ultimately leading to their confrontation. As they engage in a heated argument, a dog ranger arrives and changes the hunting seasons, causing Elmer to chase after the fox instead. Daffy, disguised as the dog ranger, watches the chaos unfold, amused by his own cleverness in manipulating his adversaries.

== Voice Cast ==
- Mel Blanc as Daffy Duck / Fox
- Arthur Q. Bryan as Elmer Fudd

== Origin of "nimrod" as an insult ==
In this short, Daffy Duck refers to Fudd as "my little nimrod", sarcastically referencing the biblical hunter of the same name. Many people did not understand the biblical reference, and as a result, thought the term meant idiot. The origin of this new meaning has often been misattributed to Bugs Bunny calling Fudd this, whereas it originated in this short.

== Home media ==
All prints have the 1950 green Merrie Melodies ending title card as the original Looney Tunes closing title card is thought to be lost.

- VHS 1988 - Cartoon Moviestars: Elmer! - MGM/UA Home Video
- Laserdisc 1988 - Cartoon Moviestars: Bugs! and Elmer! - MGM/UA Home Video
- Laserdisc 1992 - The Golden Age of Looney Tunes: Volume 2 - MGM/UA Home Video
- Blu-Ray & DVD 2012 - Looney Tunes Platinum Collection: Volume 2 (restored) - Warner Home Video

== See also ==
- Daffy Duck filmography
- Elmer Fudd filmography
- Looney Tunes and Merrie Melodies filmography (1940–1949)
