= Page Miss Glory =

Page Miss Glory may refer to:

- Page Miss Glory (play), a 1934 Broadway play written by Joseph Schrank and Philip Dunning
- Page Miss Glory (1935 film), a romantic comedy based on the play
- Page Miss Glory (1936 film), a Merrie Melodies cartoon
