= Home, Tweet Home =

- Directed by: I. Freleng
- Story by: Tedd Pierce
- Starring: Mel Blanc
- Music by: Carl Stalling
- Animation by: Arthur Davis; Gerry Chiniquy; Ken Champin; Virgil Ross
- Layouts by: Hawley Pratt
- Backgrounds by: Phil de Guard
- Color process: Technicolor
- Production company: Warner Bros. Cartoons
- Distributed by: Warner Bros. Pictures; The Vitaphone Corporation
- Release date: January 14, 1950 (USA)
- Running time: 6:45
- Language: English

Home, Tweet Home is a 1950 Warner Bros. Merrie Melodies animated short directed by Friz Freleng. The short was released on January 14, 1950, and stars Tweety and Sylvester.

== Plot ==
Tweety is washing in the park birdbath and singing "I'm Looking Over a Four Leaf Clover". Not far off there are some gentlemen seated on a park bench reading their papers. Sylvester is sitting among them and, peering through a peephole in the newspaper, inches near Tweety. As Tweety notices Sylvester attempting to capture him after initially mistaking his tongue for a towel, Tweety utters his famous catchphrase of "I tawt I taw a puddy tat," rushes off and Sylvester chases him round and round a fountain before running toward a little toddler girl on a bike wagon. Tweety rushes into Lillian, the toddler's nanny, and gains her sympathy to protect him from Sylvester. She scolds the cat, saying he ought to be ashamed of himself for attacking a poor helpless feathered creature. She then bops him with her umbrella handle, calling him a beast, coward, bully, and "Schmoe", with Tweety adding, "Yeah, shame on you, picking on poor wittle helpwess cweatures wike me. You ought to be ashamed of yourself, bad ol' putty tat!" Having had enough, Sylvester shamefully and angrily walks away.

Sylvester is undeterred however as while Lillian and Tweety are engrossed in reading Lillian's book "Amber" (based on her reactions, it may be based on "Forever Amber"), the cat swaps places with the toddler and wails to have the "pretty birdy". Lillian complies, but when Sylvester puts Tweety in his mouth (after unleashing an evil cackle as he shoves him in) Lillian, believing Sylvester to be the toddler, puts Sylvester across her lap and spanks him, scolding him, "How many times do I have to tell you not to put things in your mouth?!" A freed Tweety also spanks Sylvester for trying to eat him.

As Sylvester keeps a look out for Tweety, he simply lands on his head where he wouldn't think to look. Sylvester sets a box, stick and string trap with a cob of corn for bait. Tweety gives himself away (but not before have a conversation with an overconfident and oblivious Sylvester about how clever the cat is), leading to Sylvester trying to wallop Tweety with a stick, but Tweety jumps out of the way, and he bonks himself on the head. Tweety remarks if Sylvester were truly clever, he should have been a fox. Sylvester chases Tweety again but manages to hide behind a trash can as a bulldog approaches, walking with Tweety alongside him. When the two separate briefly around a hedge, Sylvester takes the chance, but the two reunite and he's unable to stop before he bumps into the bulldog and gets tangled in his collar. Sylvester plays as a bulldog then, as Tweety notices, he wriggles out of the collar and chases Tweety to a hotel (making a "beep" sound similar to Road Runner when he lands after he misses Tweety). The bird flies up onto a windowsill four floors above Sylvester. Sylvester flies after him with an inflated wad of bubble gum, but Tweety burst it with a pin and sends Sylvester falling. Sylvester quickly inflates another wad of bubble gum, but Tweety weighs him down with an anvil. Sylvester lets go of the anvil and is sent soaring up high in the sky. Tweety bursts his bubble with a slingshot and sends him crashing down on a pillow with the anvil in it. Sylvester then tries to whack Tweety round the corner with a shovel, but ends up hitting the vicious bulldog who chases him.

Presently, Tweety perches above Lillian, who is still reading her book. Sylvester then sneaks up disguised as a tree with a bird's nest and uses a bird whistle to attract Tweety. As Tweety settles in the nest and Sylvester is about to grab him, the dog approaches and, after being squirted with a water pistol, realizes who the tree really is and chases Sylvester, as Tweety flies out. Landing near a window, Tweety reaches in, grabs a telephone and calls up the pet shop for a new "puddy tat", remarking he's fresh out as the cartoon ends.

== Home media ==
Home, Tweet Home is available uncut and restored on Looney Tunes Platinum Collection: Volume 2.
