= Private Snafu =

Cartoon character

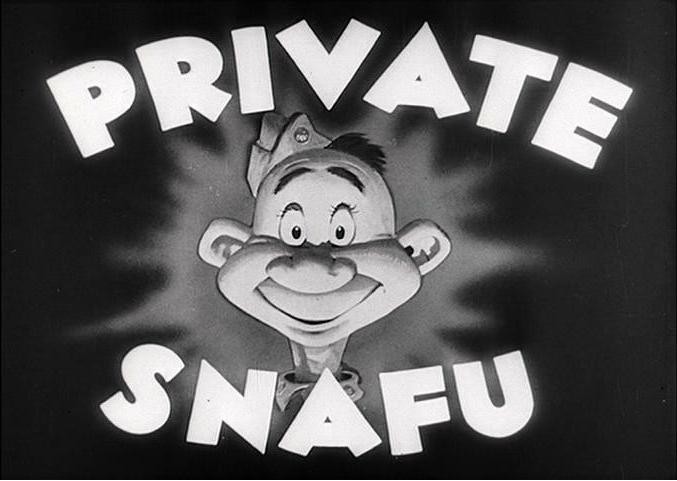
- Series title card
- Directed by: Chuck Jones; Friz Freleng; Bob Clampett; Frank Tashlin; George Gordon
- Written by: Theodor Geisel; P. D. Eastman; Munro Leaf
- Produced by: Frank Capra; Rudolf Ising
- Starring: Mel Blanc
- Music by: Carl Stalling
- Production companies: First Motion Picture Unit; Warner Bros. Cartoons
- Distributed by: United States Army
- Running time: 4 minutes
- Country: United States
- Language: English

Private Snafu is a series of black-and-white American animated instructional short films produced by the First Motion Picture Unit between 1943 and 1945 during World War II. The main character's name is a play on the military slang acronym SNAFU, "Situation Normal: All Fucked Up" (often minced as "All Fouled Up"). He is depicted as an incompetent soldier whose misadventures are intended to instruct service personnel about security, proper sanitation habits, booby traps and other military subjects. The series' animation was primarily outsourced to Warner Bros. Cartoons, producers of the Looney Tunes and Merrie Melodies series, featuring similar humor.

== Background ==
Coming!! SNAFU, the first episode introducing Private Snafu, directed by Chuck Jones, 1943.

The character was created by director Frank Capra, chairman of the U.S. Army Air Force First Motion Picture Unit, and most shorts were written by Theodor "Dr. Seuss" Geisel, Philip D. Eastman, and Munro Leaf. Although the United States Army gave Walt Disney Productions the first crack at creating the cartoons, Leon Schlesinger Productions underbid Disney by two-thirds and won the contract. Disney had also demanded exclusive ownership of the character and merchandising rights, but in the end was forced to use Donald Duck or produce individual propaganda films. Snafu was designed by Art Heinemann, the same man who would soon redesign Woody Woodpecker for Walter Lantz Productions. The animators who worked on Snafu were reunited with department head Rudolf Ising, who worked with Leon Schlesinger in the studio's early years, as well as Geisel, which had collaborated with the studio on Horton Hatches the Egg.

The goal was to help enlisted men with weak literacy skills to learn through animated cartoons (and also supplementary comic books). They featured simple language, racy illustrations, mild profanity, and subtle moralizing. Private Snafu served as a negative example, teaching basic lessons about secrecy, disease prevention, and proper military protocols through his mishaps.

Private Snafu cartoons were a military secret—for the armed forces only. Surveys to ascertain the soldiers' film favorites showed that the Snafu cartoons usually rated highest or second highest. Each cartoon was produced in six weeks. The shorts were classified government documents. Martha Sigall, employed at the ink and paint department, recalled the government security measures imposed on the staff working on them. They had to be fingerprinted and given FBI security clearances; they also had to wear identification badges at work. Workers at the ink and paint department were given only ten cels at a time in an effort to prevent them from figuring out the story content.

The name "Private Snafu" comes from the unofficial military acronym SNAFU ("Situation Normal: All Fucked Up"), with the opening narrator in the first cartoon merely hinting at its usual meaning as "Situation Normal, ... All Fouled Up!"

== Content ==
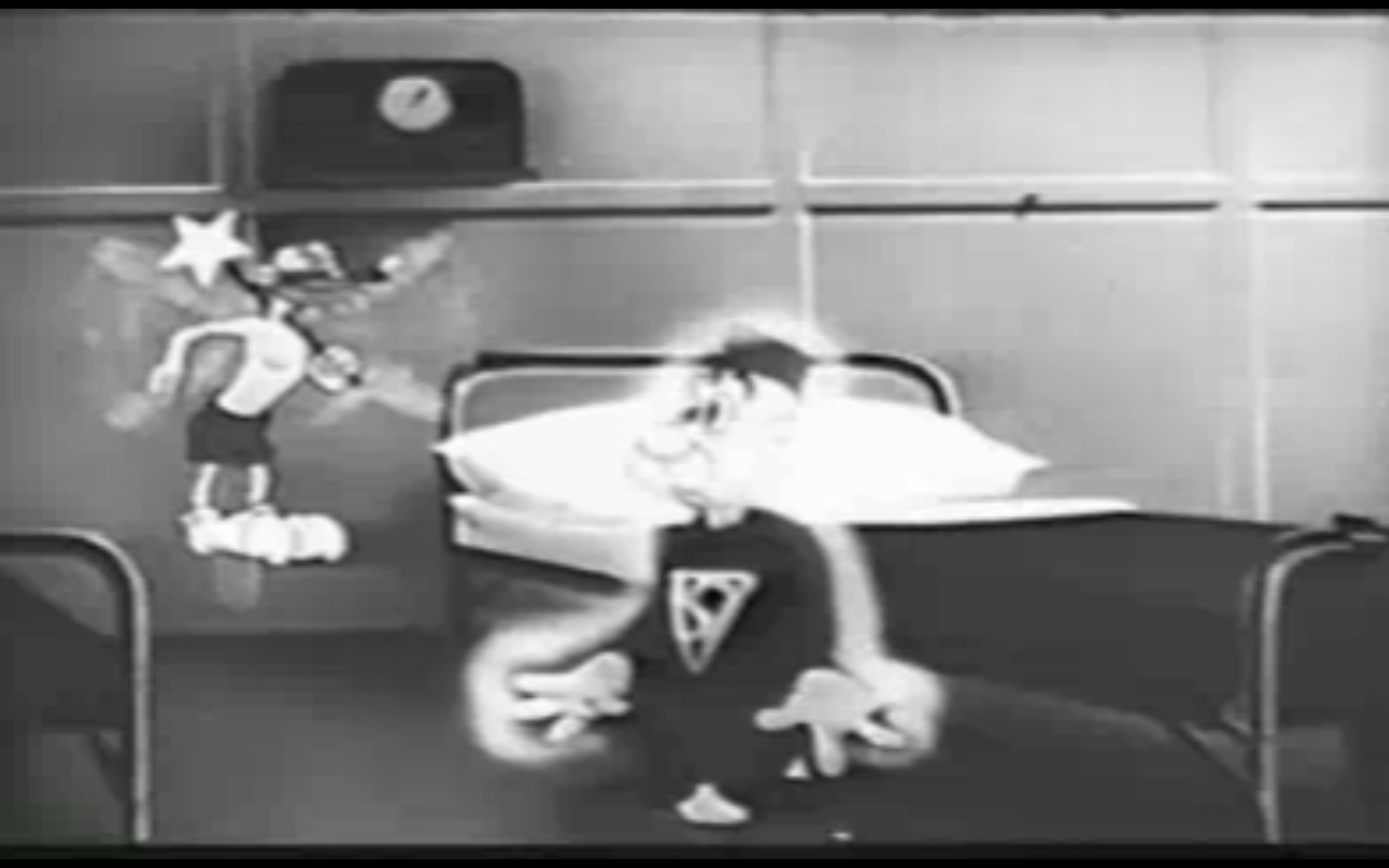
Technical Fairy, First Class, transforms Private Snafu into Snafuperman.

Home Front, directed by Frank Tashlin in 1943.

The shorts did not have to be submitted for approval at the Production Code Administration and so were not subject to the Motion Picture Production Code. Most of the Private Snafu shorts are educational, and although the War Department had to approve the storyboards, the Warner directors were allowed great latitude in order to keep the cartoons entertaining. Through his irresponsible behavior, Snafu demonstrates to soldiers what not to do while at war. In Private Snafu vs. Malaria Mike, for example, Snafu neglects to take his malaria medications or to use his repellent, allowing a suave mosquito to get him in the end—literally. In Gas Snafu throws away his gas mask and is almost killed by poison gas. In Spies, Snafu leaks classified information a little at a time until the Axis enemies piece it together, ambush his transport ship, and literally blow him to hell. Six of Snafu's shorts actually end with him being killed due to his stupidity: Spies (blown up by enemy submarine torpedoes), Booby Traps (blown up by a bomb hidden inside a piano), The Goldbrick (run over by an enemy tank), A Lecture on Camouflage (large enemy bomb lands on him), Private Snafu vs. Malaria Mike (malaria), and Going Home (run over by a street car).

Nine of the Snafu shorts feature a character named Technical Fairy, First Class. The Technical Fairy is a crass, unshaven, cigar-smoking miniature G.I. whose fairy wings bear the insignia of a technical sergeant, and who wears only socks, shorts, and a uniform hat. When he appears, he grants Snafu's wishes, most of which involve skipping protocol or trying to do things the quick and sloppy way. The results typically end in disaster, with the Technical Fairy teaching Snafu a valuable lesson about proper military procedure. For example, in the 1944 cartoon Snafuperman, the Technical Fairy transforms Private Snafu into the superhero Snafuperman, who takes bungling to a super-powered level through his carelessness.

The cartoons were intended for an audience of soldiers (as part of the bi-weekly Army-Navy Screen Magazine newsreel), and so are quite risqué by 1940s standards, with minor cursing, bare-bottomed GIs, and plenty of scantily clad (and even semi-nude) women. The depictions of Japanese and Germans are hostile-comic, par for the course in wartime U.S.

Fighting Tools, directed by Bob Clampett in 1943.

The Snafu shorts were directed by noteworthy individuals such as Chuck Jones, Friz Freleng, Bob Clampett, and Frank Tashlin, with their characteristic styles are in top form. P. D. Eastman was a writer and storyboard artist for the Snafu shorts. Voice characterizations were provided by Mel Blanc, who was under exclusive contract with Schlesinger at the time. Snafu's voice resembles Bugs Bunny, who made cameo appearances in the Snafu films Gas and Three Brothers.

Toward the end of the war, other studios began producing Snafu shorts as well (the Army accused Schlesinger of padding his bills), though some of these were never filmed before the war ended. One film, Private Snafu Presents Seaman Tarfu in the Navy, was produced by Hugh Harman Productions with Metro-Goldwyn-Mayer alumnus George Gordon directing; a second short actually produced at MGM, planned by William Hanna and Joseph Barbera was cancelled prior to filming. The Snafu films are also partly responsible for keeping the animation studios open during the war—by producing such training films, the studios were declared an essential industry.

The character has since made a couple of brief cameos: the Animaniacs episode "Boot Camping" has a character looking very much like Private Snafu, and the Futurama episode "I Dated a Robot" shows Private Snafu on the building-mounted video screen for a few seconds in the opening credits.

Gas, 1944

Operation Snafu, directed by Friz Freleng in 1945.

While Private Snafu was never officially a theatrical cartoon character when the series was launched in 1943 (with the debut short Coming! Snafu, directed by Chuck Jones), a proto-Snafu does appear, unnamed and in color, in Jones' cartoon The Draft Horse, released theatrically one year earlier, on May 9, 1942. This appearance would serve as the basis for Snafu's character in the series.

The 24th film of the series, Going Home, produced in 1945, was never released. The premise is what damage could be done if a soldier on leave talks too much about his unit's military operations. In the film, Snafu discusses a "secret weapon" with his girlfriend which was unnervingly (and unintentionally) similar to the atomic bombs under development.

== Availability ==
As now-declassified work of the United States government, all Private Snafu shorts are in the public domain and are thus freely available in numerous places, including on YouTube and Internet Archive.

Warner Home Video included Private Snafu shorts as bonus material on their Looney Tunes Golden Collection. Other commercial DVDs are available from Thunderbean Animation, who released a DVD containing all the Snafu cartoons entitled Private Snafu Golden Classics, and Bosko Video. The Private Snafu shorts were released on Blu-ray on November 19, 2015 by Thunderbean.

At least one of the Private Snafu shorts was used as an exhibit piece: the short Spies was used for the World War II exhibit at the International Spy Museum.

== Impact on children's literature ==
According to a postwar study of the Snafu cartoons, the wartime experiences of authors Theodor Geisel (Dr. Seuss), Philip D. Eastman, and Munro Leaf shaped their successful postwar children's books, especially the use of simple language, and some of the themes. Dr. Seuss wrote The Cat in the Hat (1957) because Geisel believed the widely used Dick and Jane primers were too boring to encourage children to read. Geisel, Eastman, and Leaf authored books designed to promote personal responsibility, conservation, and respect for multiculturalism. Some racial characterisations are considered questionable today. Geisel's characters were often portrayed as rebels who displayed independence of mind. Eastman's characters, on the other hand, typically embraced the wisdom of authority figures. Leaf's heroes were in between, and seemed more ambiguous toward independence and authority.

== Filmography ==
=== Private Snafu ===
Note: All shorts were created by Warner Bros. Cartoons for the U.S. War Department unless otherwise noted. The films, being produced for the U.S. government, are in the public domain.

Title	Directed by	Release date	Video	Notes
Coming!! Snafu	Chuck Jones	June 28, 1943		
Gripes	Friz Freleng	July 5, 1943		
Spies	Chuck Jones	August 9, 1943		
The Goldbrick	Frank Tashlin	September 13, 1943		
The Infantry Blues	Chuck Jones	September 20, 1943		
Fighting Tools	Bob Clampett	October 18, 1943		Cameo of Daffy Duck as Father Duck. A briefly seen newspaper sub-headline reads "Adolph Hitler Commits Suicide", an event that would not become a reality until 18 months after this short premiered.
The Home Front	Frank Tashlin	November 15, 1943		Some versions of this short exist where the line at the beginning, "It's so cold, it could freeze the nuts off a jeep" was cut.
Rumors	Friz Freleng	December 13, 1943		
Booby Traps	Bob Clampett	January 10, 1944		First appearance of the "Endearing Young Charms" musical bomb gag, which would be reused in two Bugs Bunny shorts ("Ballot Box Bunny" and "Show Biz Bugs"), one Wile E.Coyote/Road Runner short ("Rushing Roulette"), and in Animaniacs ("Slappy Goes Walnuts").
Snafuperman	Friz Freleng	March 6, 1944		
Private Snafu vs. Malaria Mike	Chuck Jones	March 27, 1944		
A Lecture on Camouflage	Chuck Jones	April 24, 1944		
Gas	Chuck Jones	May 29, 1944		Bugs Bunny makes a cameo appearance being pulled from Snafu's gas mask bag.
The Chow Hound	Friz Freleng	June 19, 1944		
Censored	Frank Tashlin	July 17, 1944		
Outpost	Chuck Jones	August 1, 1944		
Payday	Friz Freleng	September 25, 1944		
Target Snafu	Frank Tashlin	October 23, 1944		
Three Brothers	Friz Freleng	December 4, 1944		Bugs Bunny makes a cameo appearance in the scene where Fubar tries to escape from the dogs.
In the Aleutians – Isles of Enchantment	Chuck Jones	February 12, 1945		
It's Murder She Says	Chuck Jones	February 26, 1945		
Hot Spot	Friz Freleng	July 2, 1945		Bugs Bunny makes a brief cameo appearance in The Devil's atlas.
No Buddy Atoll	Chuck Jones	October 8, 1945		
Operation Snafu	Friz Freleng	December 22, 1945		In a cartoon with no dialog, Snafu does something right for once as he personally steals Japanese war plans and captures Tojo himself.
Seaman Tarfu in the Navy	George Gordon	1946		Produced by Hugh Harman Productions.
Unreleased shorts
Going Home	Chuck Jones	Unreleased (planned for 1944); December 31, 2001 (Cartoon Network)		There are various theories as to why the short was never released, among them that the depicted "secret weapon" was too reminiscent of the American nuclear weapons program. The film was first made viewable to the public on Cartoon Network's ToonHeads episode "Cartoon News Reels!" on December 31, 2001.
Secrets of the Caribbean	Chuck Jones	Unreleased (planned for 1945)	N/A	Master given to the Army. Lost cartoon
Unproduced short
Mop Up	William Hanna & Joseph Barbera	Unproduced (planned for 1945)	N/A	Project was aborted before filming; also known as How to Get a Fat Jap Out of a Cave.

=== A Few Quick Facts ===
In addition to his own shorts, Snafu made some cameo appearances in the Few Quick Facts series of Army-commissioned training films produced by other studios.

Title	Date	Studio(s)	Notes
AIR&NAVY/China/Safety	1944	MGM	Snafu appears in the third segment.
US Soldier/Bullet/Diarrhea and Dysentery	1944	MGM and UPA	Snafu appears in the third segment.
USS Iowa/Brain/Shoes	1944	MGM	Snafu appears in the third segment.
Chaplain Corps/Accidents/Gas	1944	MGM	Snafu appears in the second act.
Voting for Servicemen Overseas	1944	Disney	
Venereal Disease	1944	Disney	Lost cartoon
Inflation	1945	UPA	
About Fear	1945	UPA	
Japan	1945	UPA	
Lend/Lease	1945	UPA	
GI Bill of Rights	1946	Disney	

In addition, Weapons of War (1944) produced by MGM was originally planned to be part of the Few Quick Facts series but was left out, while Another Change (1945) produced by Disney was probably also left out of the Few Quick Facts series.

== Similar cartoons ==
Private Snafu was not the only character created to educate soldiers for the Army, as a few others with different purposes are known to exist.

- Created by cartoonist Hank Ketcham, Mr. Hook was created to encourage American Navy personnel to buy war bonds and hold them until the end of the war. The first short of the series was produced by Walter Lantz Productions in color while the remaining shorts were made by Warner Bros. Cartoons in black-and-white.
- Hugh Harman also created a short series called Commandments for Health, along with a character named Private McGillicuddy. McGillicuddy was a US Marine who shared similarities to Snafu (both even voiced by Mel Blanc), but this series has a much greater emphasis on health care. Harman's shorts also used limited animation, which had yet to be popularized by mainstream studios at the time.
- Warner Bros. also produced a short entitled Dive Bombing Crashes, a cartoon made for a joint-series called Pilot Safety, featuring the character Grampaw Pettibone. Two shorts were known to be made, the second of which was produced by UPA.

Chuck Jones would later direct a 1955 cartoon entitled A Hitch In Time, a short made for the United States Air Force to encourage airmen to re-enlist. The lead character, John McRoger, bears strong resemblance to Snafu, albeit updated to Jones's mid-1950s style, while he encounters Grogan, Technical Gremlin First Class, an updated version of the Technical Fairy from the WWII Snafu shorts.

== Sources ==
- Cohen, Karl F. (2004). "Censorship of Theatrical Animation". Forbidden Animation: Censored Cartoons and Blacklisted Animators in America. McFarland & Company. ISBN 978-0786420322.

== See also ==
- Dilbert Groundloop
- Sad Sack
