= Tortoise Beats Hare =

1941 film by Fred Avery

- Title card
- Directed by: Fred Avery
- Story by: Dave Monahan
- Produced by: Leon Schlesinger
- Starring: Mel Blanc
- Music by: Carl W. Stalling
- Animation by: Charles McKimson
- Color process: Technicolor
- Production company: Leon Schlesinger Productions
- Distributed by: Warner Bros. Pictures
- Release date: March 15, 1941
- Running time: 7:55
- Language: English

Tortoise Beats Hare is a 1941 American animated comedy short film directed by Fred Avery. It was released on March 15, 1941. It is part of the Merrie Melodies series and the seventh cartoon to feature Bugs Bunny. The short is a parody of Aesop's fable The Tortoise and the Hare. Cecil Turtle is introduced as a recurring rival to Bugs.

== Plot ==
Bugs Bunny comes upon the title card, attempting to read the credits with mispronunciations while eating a carrot. Realizing the film's title, Bugs destroys the credits and searches for the tortoise. His attention soon turns to Cecil Turtle, with whom he enters into a high-stakes wager of ten dollars on a race (equivalent to $226.54 in 2026). Cecil, employing cunning strategy, enlists the aid of his turtle cousins to impersonate him at various points along the racecourse, thus maintaining a deceptive lead over Bugs. Despite Bugs' initial confidence and commanding lead, he finds himself outwitted by Cecil's clever ploy. Convinced of his victory as he crosses the finish line, Bugs is surprised to find Cecil awaiting him as the apparent winner.

Grudgingly conceding defeat, Bugs pays Cecil his wager, reflecting a mixture of anger and bewilderment. However, a sudden realization dawns upon Bugs as he ponders the possibility of being duped. Turning back, he is met with Cecil and his cousins, each holding a share of the winnings, who respond, "Ehhh, it's a possibility!" (a line popularized by Artie Auerbach on the Al Pearce radio show) before simultaneously smooching Bugs as the cartoon irises out.

== Voice Cast ==
- Mel Blanc as Bugs Bunny / Cecil Turtle / Cecil Turtle's relatives

== Home media ==
- VHS 1986 - Viddy-Oh! For Kids Cartoon Festival: Bugs Bunny Cartoon Festival Featuring "Little Red Riding Rabbit" - MGM/UA Home Video
- VHS 1991 - Bugs Bunny Collection: Bugs Bunny's Zaniest Toons - MGM/UA Home Video
- Laserdisc 1991 - The Golden Age of Looney Tunes: Volume 1 - MGM/UA Home Video
- VHS 1992 - The Golden Age of Looney Tunes: Vol. 10 - The Art of Bugs - MGM/UA Home Video
- VHS 1999 - Bugs Bunny: Big Top Bunny - Warner Home Video
- VHS 1999 - Looney Tunes: The Collector's Edition - Vol. 8, Tex-Book Looney - Warner Home Video/Columbia House
- DVD 2004 - Looney Tunes Golden Collection: Volume 2 (restored) - Warner Home Video
- Blu-Ray & DVD 2012 - Looney Tunes Platinum Collection: Volume 2 (restored) - Warner Home Video
- DVD 2014 - Looney Tunes Spotlight Collection: Volume 8 (restored) - Warner Home Video
- Blu-Ray 2023 - The Strawberry Blonde (extra, restored) - Warner Archive Collection

== See also ==
- Tortoise Wins by a Hare
- Rabbit Transit
- Bugs Bunny filmography
- Looney Tunes and Merrie Melodies filmography (1940–1949)

Preceded by Elmer's Pet Rabbit	Bugs Bunny Cartoons; 1941	Succeeded by Hiawatha's Rabbit Hunt
