= Porky's Hare Hunt =

1938 film by Ben Hardaway

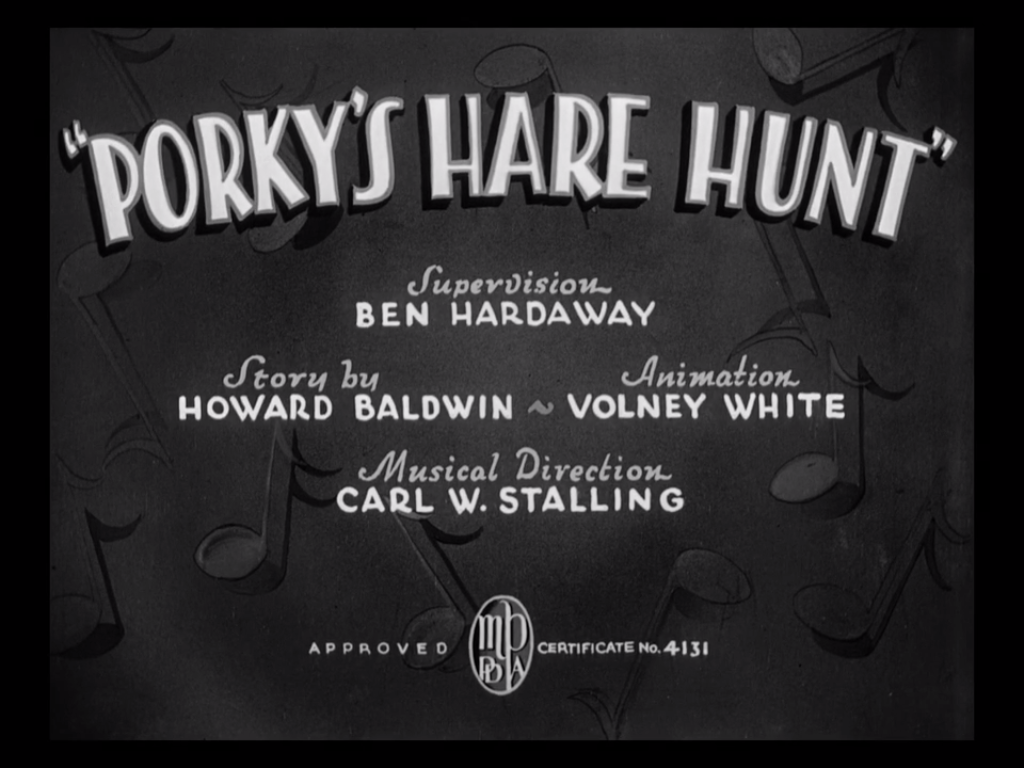
- Title card
- Directed by: Ben Hardaway
- Story by: Howard Baldwin
- Produced by: Leon Schlesinger
- Starring: Mel Blanc
- Music by: Carl W. Stalling
- Animation by: Volney White
- Color process: Black-and-white
- Production company: Leon Schlesinger Productions
- Distributed by: Warner Bros. Productions; The Vitaphone Corporation
- Release date: April 30, 1938
- Running time: 8 min
- Country: United States
- Language: English

Porky's Hare Hunt is a 1938 American animated comedy short film directed by Ben Hardaway. The short was released on April 30, 1938. It is the 101st film in the Looney Tunes series, the 39th cartoon to feature Porky Pig and the first cartoon to star a character that would later be named Bugs Bunny.

== Plot ==
Porky Pig and a prototype Bugs Bunny

Several rabbits eat corn at a cornfield, remaining unfazed when gunshot is heard until a larger rabbit warns them to flee. The rabbit sneaks behind hunter Porky Pig and his dog Zero, baiting him into destroying the cornfield. Zero is sent to capture the rabbit. The rabbit hides in the same tree trunk Zero is in and deploys a decoy rabbit, which kicks Zero before being dismantled.

Porky uses his shotgun to sniff the rabbit's tracks, which is outsmarted by the rabbit with pepper, causing it to destroy a tree with the rabbit in it. The rabbit drinks a bottle of "hare remover", causing him to become invisible and hit the confused Porky on the head. The rabbit emerges from a top hat and effortlessly dodges gunfire. He then uses a piece of cloth to bait Zero bullfighter-style into slamming into an oil barrel and a log. He does a magic trick and conceals Zero in the cloth before sending him flying into Porky. He flies with his ears spinning like a helicopter and taunts Porky and the dog by flying near them, before running off into the woods while laughing.

Porky seemingly outwits the rabbit by appearing on the other end of a log which is intended for tricking the dog. The rabbit tries to negotiate with a picture of him, his wife and dozens of children, which do not convince Porky to spare him. Porky's shotgun jams, inspiring the rabbit to exploit the opportunity by breaking the shotgun and demanding to see Porky's license, which he destroys for his amusement. He flies away but is hit by a rock thrown by Porky, causing him to land on a haystack. Porky believes he has caught the rabbit, who then pretends to be dying to throw off Porky. He says, "Of course you do know that this means war?" before walking away and playing "The Girl I Left Behind" on the flute. Porky chases him into a mineshaft and throws dynamite into it, only for it to be thrown back and catching him in the explosion. Porky recovers from serious injuries, including a broken leg, in the hospital, while the rabbit visits with flowers. As Porky replies that he will be out in a couple of days, the rabbit prolongs it by pulling on a mechanism to injure Porky's foot further before running off.

== Voice Cast ==
- Mel Blanc as Porky Pig / The Rabbit
  - Ben Hardaway as The Rabbit (one line: "Of course you know that this means war!")
- Melvin J. Gibby as Porky's Dog (barking effects, unconfirmed)

== Production ==
Porky's Hare Hunt marked the first appearance of the rabbit that would evolve into Bugs Bunny, who is barely recognizable compared to his more familiar later form. According to Martha Sigall, Hardaway initially developed the character to be closer to Daffy Duck, but introduced newer character traits to distinguish the two in subsequent cartoons. Tex Avery refined the character and his personality into his current form in A Wild Hare, which extensively homaged Porky's Hare Hunt. Chuck Jones purported that Cal Dalton co-directed the short, as with all of Hardaway's films produced after this cartoon, though the claim was not backed up elsewhere.

Hardaway later moved to Walter Lantz Productions, where he created a woodpecker character as an antagonist for Andy Panda in Knock Knock, who inherited the rabbit's laugh and madcap personality. The character, Woody Woodpecker, became significantly more popular than Andy and received his own series; he at one point was able to compete with Bugs in terms of popularity.

== Home media ==
- Blu-Ray & DVD 2012 - Looney Tunes Platinum Collection: Volume 2 (restored) - Warner Home Video
- DVD 2017 - Porky Pig 101 (restored) - Warner Archive Collection

== See also ==
- Bugs Bunny filmography
- Porky Pig filmography
- Looney Tunes and Merrie Melodies filmography (1930–1939)

Preceded by None	Bugs Bunny Cartoons; 1938	Succeeded by Prest-O Change-O
