= Cecil Turtle =

Warner Bros. theatrical cartoon character

- Looney Tunes/Merrie Melodies character
- First appearance: Tortoise Beats Hare (1941)
- Created by: Tex Avery
- Voiced by: Mel Blanc (1941–1947); Frank Welker (1998); Joe Alaskey (2003); Jim Rash (2012–2015); Matt Craig (2017); Keith Ferguson (Looney Tunes Cartoons; 2021); Eric Bauza (Looney Tunes: World of Mayhem); Bob Bergen (Bugs Bunny Builders; 2022–2024)

In-universe information
- Species: Tortoise
- Gender: Male

Cecil Turtle is a fictional character in the Warner Bros. Looney Tunes and Merrie Melodies series of films. Though he made only three theatrical appearances, Cecil has the unusual distinction of being one of the very few characters to have ever outsmarted Bugs Bunny, and the only one to do so three times in a row at the rabbit's own game.

== History ==
=== Tortoise Beats Hare ===
Animator Tex Avery introduced Cecil in the short Tortoise Beats Hare, released on March 15, 1941. Even from the cartoon's opening titles, Avery lets on that Bugs Bunny is about to meet his match. Bugs wanders onto the screen munching his obligatory carrot and absentmindedly begins reading the title card, grossly mispronouncing most of the credits, such as /əˈvɛri/ for "Avery" rather than the correct /ˈeɪvəri/. When he finally gets to the title itself, he becomes outraged, tears apart the title card, and rushes to Cecil Turtle's house. He then bets the little, sleepy-eyed turtle ten dollars that he can beat him in a race.

Cecil accepts Bugs' bet, and the race begins several days later. Bugs races away at top speed just before finishing the shout of, "Get on your mark, get set, go!" Cecil quickly (for him, anyway) goes to a public telephone and calls up Chester Turtle, one of his relatives. After talking to Chester about the bet, he tells him to call "the boys" (cousins), and tell them to be ready when he comes to their position, and to "give him the works". Chester calls the relatives, all of whom look and sound like Cecil (some have deeper voices, some have higher voices), and relays the message. As Bugs runs relentlessly toward the finish line, Cecil and the other turtles take turns showing up at just the right moment to baffle the bunny. In the end, Bugs is convinced he has won, only to see Cecil (or one of his nine kin) across the finish demanding the money. Bugs suggests that he has been tricked, and all nine cousin turtles approach and reply, "It's a possibility!" Voice actor Mel Blanc supplies Cecil's drowsy drawl, which is like a slowed-down version of Blanc's later characterization of Barney Rubble.

"Tortoise Beats Hare" follows one of the many folk variants of the Aesop fable "The Tortoise and the Hare" in which the faster beast is deceived by lookalikes placed along the course. More directly, it is Avery's parody of the 1935 Disney Silly Symphony, The Tortoise and the Hare. Avery left Warner Bros. before he could produce any new cartoons featuring Cecil. However, he introduced a similar character in 1943 named Droopy Dog. Droopy would even take some of his tricks from his slow-and-steady predecessor, such as using his relatives to help him outsmart a wolf.

=== Tortoise Wins by a Hare ===
Bob Clampett took Avery's scenario and altered it for his film Tortoise Wins by a Hare released on February 20, 1943. Bugs again challenges Cecil to a race after viewing footage from their previous encounter two years earlier (which seems to depict Cecil as having won fairly instead of by cheating Bugs with his cousins). Bugs then goes to Cecil's tree home disguised as an old man (a parody of Bill Thompson's "Old Timer" character from the radio series Fibber McGee and Molly) to ask the turtle his secret. Cecil, not in the least bit fooled by the disguise remarks, "Clean livin', friend. Clean livin'...". Upon Bugs' continued insistence, Cecil claims that the "modern design" of his streamlined shell lets him win, whereas the design of the rabbit is "all wrong" due to the air resistance applied on the long ears. Cecil also produces a set of blueprints for his "air-flow chassis". The turtle ends the conversation with the comment, "Oh, and another thing... Rabbits aren't very bright, either!" just before slamming the door in the enraged bunny's face. Not getting the hint that the turtle's story is a humbug, Bugs builds the device and prepares for the race.

Meanwhile, a bunny mob learns of the upcoming match-up and places all its bets on Bugs. ("In fact, we don't even think that the toitle will finish... Do we, boys?" "Duh, no, Boss, no!") The race begins, and Bugs still outpaces his reptilian rival. After a short while, Bugs wears the specially made turtle-shell chassis on his body and puts on a rubber cap to cover his ears. However, in his new get-up, the dim-witted gangsters mistake him for the turtle. Cecil reinforces this misconception by dressing in a gray rabbit suit and munching on some delicious carrots. The mobsters thus make the shelled Bugs' run a nightmare, ultimately giving the race to Cecil (in an aside to the audience, as the rabbits cheer him, Cecil remarks "I told you rabbits aren't very bright!"). When Bugs angrily tears off the chassis and shouts, "You FOOLS! I'M the rabbit!" the rabbit gangsters remark, in mock-Bugsy style, "Ehhh, now he tells us!" and commit suicide by shooting themselves with a single bullet that goes through the sides of all of their apparently soft heads. (The final gag is often cut when shown on basic cable television, but can be found uncut on the Looney Tunes Golden Collection: Volume 1 and the Looney Tunes Platinum Collection: Volume 2.)

=== Rabbit Transit ===
Cecil and Bugs would have one final match up in Friz Freleng's cartoon, Rabbit Transit, released on May 10, 1947. The title is a play of Rapid Transit. Unlike Tortoise Wins by a Hare, this cartoon presumes that Bugs and Cecil have never met before now. While relaxing in a steam bath, Bugs reads about the original fable and, as he did reading the credits of Tortoise Beats Hare, becomes incensed at the idea of a turtle outrunning a rabbit. Cecil, also in the steam bath, claims that he could outrun Bugs, prompting Bugs to challenge him to a race (again, as in Tortoise Beats Hare, although at least here Bugs receives some provocation). This time, Bugs and Cecil agree to no cheating. Cecil, however, quickly reveals that his shell is now rocket propelled, allowing him to go a surprising combination between fast and slow. Bugs does his best to steal, dismantle, and destroy the device, but all to little effect. In the end, however, Bugs does manage to top the turtle and crosses the finish line first. Nevertheless, it is Cecil who has the last laugh when he rooks the rabbit into confessing to "doing 100 easy"—in a 30-miles-per-hour zone. Bugs is taken away by the police to enjoy his victory — behind bars. Cecil closes out the cartoon by saying Bugs' famous line, "Ain't I um...a stinker?" Iris-out.

== Other appearances ==
The Termite Terrace directors retired Cecil after his third showdown with Bugs. Nevertheless, Cecil has made occasional cameos in later projects. He is seen briefly in the 1996 film Space Jam as an audience member during the game and its 2021 sequel Space Jam: A New Legacy in Bugs' flashback leaving Tune World in front of Charlie Dog. He makes a cameo appearance in the prologue sequence of the 2026 film Coyote vs Acme pressing a security alarm when Dr. Lorre tries to leave the ACME factory. He also appears in the 2003 DVD Looney Tunes: Reality Check, voiced by Joe Alaskey. He also made a cameo in one episode of The Sylvester and Tweety Mysteries, voiced by Frank Welker.

He features in some issues of the Looney Tunes comic book.

His only notable Warner Bros. Looney Tunes appearance was featured in the 1954 short Devil May Hare, which was directed by Robert McKimson and pitted Bugs against the Tasmanian Devil, who made his debut here.

Cecil Turtle appears in The Looney Tunes Show, voiced by Jim Rash. He and Bugs are once again enemies like in the classic shorts, and he has a habit of mispronouncing Bugs's name as "Buges Buney." In Cecil's appearances in this show, he is the one who gets outwitted by Bugs, the first time in Looney Tunes history. His next appearance was in the episode The Shell Game. Now working as a scammer, Cecil tricks both Bugs and Porky into thinking they damaged his shell. However, Bugs started seeing through Cecil's con, and confronted him with Porky and took down his shell scam and sending him to prison, as well as scoring another victory over Cecil. Cecil also appears as one of the main antagonists in the spinoff film Looney Tunes: Rabbits Run, voiced again by Rash and appearing as a spy working for the Mexican general Foghorn Leghorn until the near climax reveals that he has been working for Marvin the Martian.

Cecil makes recurring appearances in New Looney Tunes, voiced by series producer Matt Craig. In the show, he and Bugs have races against each other which ends with both of them losing.

Cecil appears in Looney Tunes Cartoons, voiced by Keith Ferguson. He appears in the episode "Shell Shocked", where traveling from Bronx to Brooklyn, Bugs beats a Public Transit Train and comments how nobody is faster than him. However, Bugs becomes infuriated when he comes across advertisements showcasing Cecil Turtle as the "actual fastest thing in New York City". Bugs runs into Cecil and challenges him to a footrace to a nearby lamppost. Bugs gains the early lead but Cecil ties the street Bugs is on to a taxi going to St. Louis, allowing Cecil to win. Bugs then challenges Cecil to see how fast they can multiply numbers, but Cecil wins again by multiplying himself. Bugs becomes enraged and has one more challenge for Cecil: how fast he can eat carrots. However, Bugs disguised a bomb as a carrot. When the bomb doesn't go off, Bugs looks and sees all the carrots have been eaten by Cecil. Bugs looks into Cecil's shell, coming face-to-face with the bomb that explodes right in his face. As Cecil proclaims victory, Bugs says there is one thing he's better at than Cecil: losing and starts crying.

Cecil appeared in Bugs Bunny Builders, where he is voiced by Bob Bergen. Unlike in the original shorts, he and Bugs appear on friendly terms.

== Legacy ==
Because of Cecil's modest amount of popularity, Warner Bros. created a protégé of the character in Tiny Toon Adventures named Tyrone Turtle. Unlike Cecil and Bugs, however, Tyrone is on friendly terms with Bugs's Tiny Toons counterpart, Buster Bunny.
