= Hare-um Scare-um =

1939 film by Ben Hardaway and Cal Dalton

- Title card
- Directed by: Ben Hardaway; Cal Dalton
- Story by: Melvin Millar
- Produced by: Leon Schlesinger
- Starring: Mel Blanc; Pinto Colvig
- Music by: Carl W. Stalling
- Animation by: Gil Turner
- Color process: Technicolor
- Production company: Leon Schlesinger Productions
- Distributed by: Warner Bros. Pictures
- Release date: August 12, 1939
- Running time: 7 min
- Country: United States
- Language: English

Hare-um Scare-um is a 1939 American animated comedy short film directed by Ben Hardaway and Cal Dalton. The short was released on August 12, 1939. It is part of the Merrie Melodies series and the third cartoon to feature the character that would later be named Bugs Bunny.

Bugs was redesigned by Charles Thorson as a grey rabbit more similar to his current self than his previous appearances; while his voice and laugh remained intact, he was given new character traits to distinguish him from Daffy Duck, setting the stage for Tex Avery's A Wild Hare, which features extensive homages to the cartoon while also refining Bugs' personality. The original ending was removed for its overt similarities to Daffy Duck & Egghead, but it was restored for Looney Tunes Platinum Collection: Volume 2.

== Plot ==
John Sourpuss reads a newspaper article stating that meat prices have soared and the consumers are sore. Enraged, he declares that he will hunt his own meat to get back at the government for the price inflation. He takes his dog with him to hunt a rabbit. A rabbit stamps fake tracks to lead the dog into a hollow log and pushes the log down a hill, where it smashes into a tree. Meanwhile, John sees several rabbits hopping over a hill. He fires his gun several times and runs to where the rabbits were. When he gets there, he finds two spinning wheels with pictures of rabbits on them, giving the perception of moving rabbits.

John then sees the rabbit sleeping. He starts pouring salt on the rabbit's tail. The rabbit quickly gets up and holds a stick of celery under the stream of salt. The rabbit then runs into a cave, and John runs after him. Before he reaches the cave, a pair of elevator doors closes, which John runs into.

The rabbit then dresses as a female dog, successfully seducing John's dog. When the dog finally realizes he's with the rabbit rather than another dog, he resumes his chase. The rabbit then pretends he's a policeman, citing the dog for numerous crimes (speeding, running on the wrong side of the street, intoxicated "driving", etc.).

After confusing the dog and running away, the rabbit begins singing a song about how crazy he is, while tearing a poster advertising the Looney Tunes series with Porky Pig on it. When he finishes his song, he turns to find John with his gun aimed at him. The rabbit, trying to gain sympathy, begs for his life, explaining how poor and sick he is. John begins crying, feeling sorry for the rabbit. Despite this, the rabbit shocks John with a joy buzzer. John then shouts that he can whip the rabbit and his whole family. Suddenly, a large group of rabbits surround John, looking for a fight. The rabbits attack John in a cartoon smoke cloud and then run away. The smoke clears up to show John disheveled. The rabbit returns to give John his busted rifle saying "You oughtta get that fixed. Somebody's liable to get hurt." The rabbit then returns to his loony self, bouncing on his head like a pogo stick down the road. John becomes enraged, but then leaves the scene in the same manner as the rabbit.

== Voice Cast ==
- Mel Blanc as The Rabbit (sped-up) / John Sourpuss

== Home media ==
- Laserdisc 1992 – The Golden Age of Looney Tunes: Volume 2 (unrestored without lost ending) - MGM/UA Home Video
- DVD 2008 – Invisible Stripes (extra, unrestored without lost ending) - Warner Home Video
- Blu-Ray & DVD – Looney Tunes Platinum Collection: Volume 2 (restored with original ending) - Warner Home Video

=== Streaming ===
- HBO Max (without lost ending)
- Tubi (without lost ending)

== See also ==
- Bugs Bunny filmography
- Looney Tunes and Merrie Melodies filmography (1930–1939)

| Preceded by Prest-O Change-O | Bugs Bunny Cartoons; 1939 | Succeeded by Elmer's Candid Camera |
