= Prest-O Change-O =

1939 film by Charles Jones

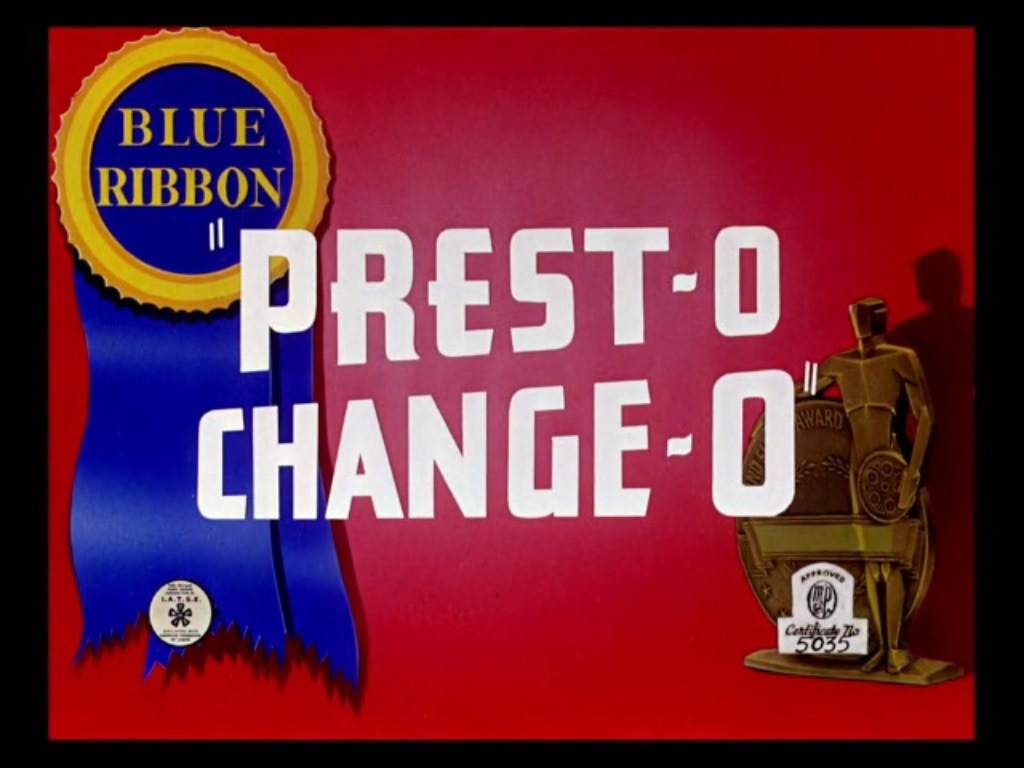
- Blue Ribbon title card
- Directed by: Charles Jones
- Story by: Rich Hogan
- Produced by: Leon Schlesinger
- Music by: Carl W. Stalling
- Animation by: Rudy Larriva
- Color process: Technicolor
- Production company: Leon Schlesinger Productions
- Distributed by: Warner Bros. Pictures; The Vitaphone Corporation
- Release date: March 25, 1939
- Running time: 7 minutes
- Country: United States
- Language: English

Prest-O Change-O is a 1939 American animated comedy short film directed by Charles Jones. It was released on March 25, 1939. It is part of the Merrie Melodies series, the second cartoon to feature the Two Curious Puppies and the second cartoon to star a character that would later be named Bugs Bunny. After this film, Ben Hardaway redesigned the character into a grey hare in Hare-um Scare-um (1939). It was re-released as a "Blue Ribbon" reissue in 1949, rendering the original film and credits lost.

== Plot ==
The Two Curious Puppies are being pursued by a dog catcher until they hide in the house of the magician Sham-Fu, who is away and as such has his rabbit guard his house. As the smaller puppy enters a door which disappears before the larger puppy could enter, the larger puppy meets the rabbit who shows off various magic tricks. He slams a vase on the puppy and stops him from following by clipping his nose with a lobster. The puppy shakes off the lobster into another vase, from which the rabbit reemerges. He taunts the puppy with a toy gun and turns into a tree whose fruit tickles the puppy. The puppy shakes the tree to reveal the rabbit, who kisses and enrages him before disappearing.

Meanwhile, the smaller puppy meets a Hindu rope trick who beats him up. He follows the rope to Sham-Fu's magic wand, which the rope uses to slam a vase on the puppy, recover him with water then trap him in a water pitcher. The puppy frees himself and destroys the pitcher, which the rope turns into canaries with the wand. After a few more tricks, the puppy successfully wrangles the wand from the rope, but swallows it, causing him to hiccup canaries and an egg out of embarrassment.

The larger puppy finds the rabbit which pours itself out of a water pitcher. He turns invisible and "retrieves" a cloth from the puppy's ear, which features him, then emerges from the cloth to taunt the puppy. He runs to a door and taunts the puppy through drawers. While the smaller puppy hiccups balloons, the larger puppy is cornered and kissed by the rabbit. The rabbit prepares to leave but is hit by the smaller puppy, causing them to fly towards the larger puppy. The larger puppy places the rabbit in a trash can, which he places into two larger chests, but fails as the rabbit emerges from a balloon hiccuped by the smaller puppy. Finally having enough of the rabbit's tricks, he realizes how the rabbit's disappearance works and catches the rabbit's hands on time, throwing him into a nearby fish bowl and knocking him out to their surprise.

== Voice Cast ==
- Mel Blanc as The Rabbit (sped up) / Cuckoo Clock / Dog Hic-cupping / Dog laughing
- Melvin Gibby as the Two Curious Puppies (barks, unconfirmed)

== Home media ==
- Laserdisc 1992 - The Golden Age of Looney Tunes: Volume 2 - MGM/UA Home Video
- Blu-Ray & DVD 2012 - Looney Tunes Platinum Collection: Volume 2 (restored) - Warner Home Video

== See also ==
- Bugs Bunny filmography
- Looney Tunes and Merrie Melodies filmography (1930–1939)
- List of animated films in the public domain in the United States

Preceded by Porky's Hare Hunt	Bugs Bunny prototype Cartoons; 1939	Succeeded by Hare-um Scare-um
