= Elmer's Candid Camera =

1940 film by Charles Jones

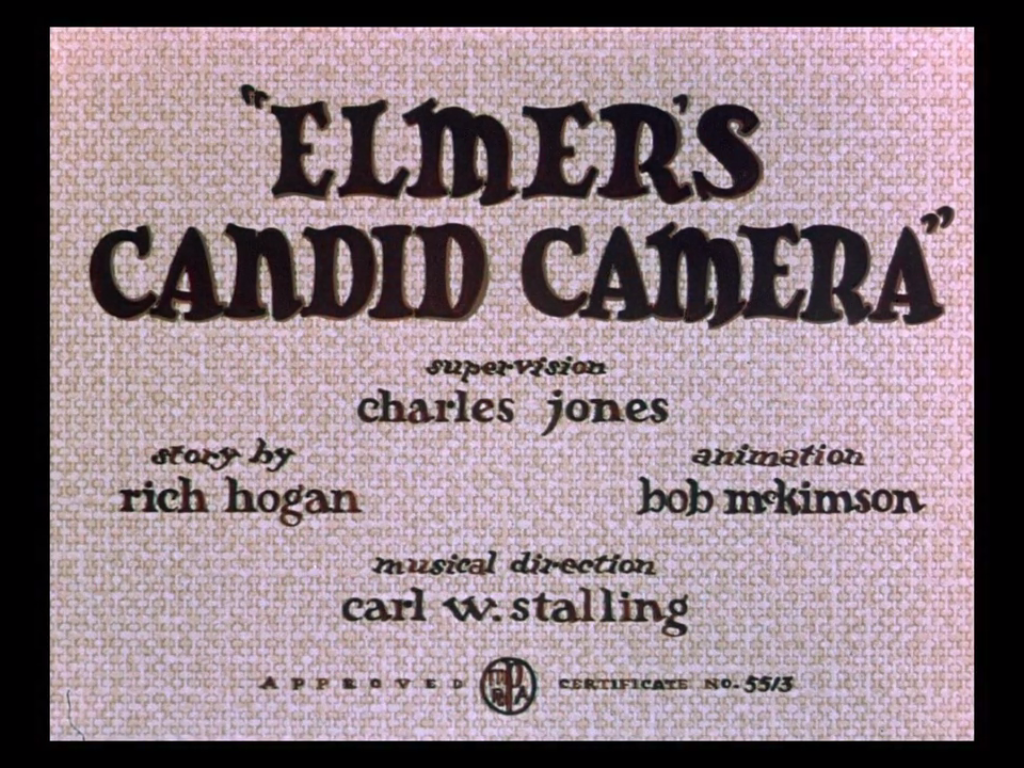
- Title card
- Directed by: Charles Jones
- Story by: Rich Hogan
- Produced by: Leon Schlesinger
- Starring: Mel Blanc; Arthur Q. Bryan; Marion Darlington (all uncredited)
- Music by: Carl W. Stalling
- Animation by: Bob McKimson
- Color process: Technicolor
- Production company: Leon Schlesinger Productions
- Distributed by: Warner Bros. Pictures
- Release date: March 2, 1940
- Running time: 7 min
- Country: United States
- Language: English

Elmer's Candid Camera is a 1940 American animated comedy short film directed by Charles Jones. The short was released on March 2, 1940. It is part of the Merrie Melodies series, the ninth cartoon to feature Elmer Fudd and the fourth cartoon to feature a character that would later be named Bugs Bunny. Arthur Q. Bryan's portrayal of Elmer Fudd in the film would cement the character's personality and mannerisms for his future cartoons, pivoting from making only cameo appearances into being a star of his own.

== Plot ==
Elmer Fudd, resembling his prototype early in his career, being annoyed by the rabbit

Elmer is reading a book on how to photograph wildlife and decides to do so with his new camera. He annoys a sleeping rabbit, who is amused by his stupidity in unable to recognize a rabbit and decides to torment him. Elmer tries to photograph a squirrel, only to be tricked by the rabbit into slamming into an apple tree. He then distracts Elmer from properly photographing a bird.

Elmer traps the rabbit with a net. The rabbit exploits Elmer's stupidity to pretend having asphyxiated from the ordeal, then traps Elmer with the net instead. Elmer goes insane, destroys his camera and attempts suicide by drowning. The rabbit saves him before sending him into the water again with his book.

== Voice Cast ==
Note: All voice actors are uncredited

- Mel Blanc as The Rabbit
- Arthur Q. Bryan as Elmer Fudd
- Marion Darlington as Birds whistling

== Legacy ==
Chuck Jones directed this cartoon in a time when he was going for a more slow and methodical approach in a vain attempt to imitate Disney's cartoons. He would later go on to disavow this short later in his life. In his autobiography Chuck Amuck: The Life and Times of an Animated Cartoonist, he stated:

"In this cartoon we find Bugs stumbling, fumbling, and mumbling around, vainly seeking a personality on which to hang him dialogue and action, or— in better words than mine—'walking around with his umbilical in his hand, looking for someplace to plug it in.' It is obvious when one views this cartoon, which I recommend only if you are going to die of ennui, that my conception of timing and dialogue was formed by watching the action in the La Brea tar pits. It would be complimentary to call it sluggish. Not only Bugs suffered at my hands, but difficult as it is to make an unassertive character like Elmer Fudd into a flat, complete shmuck, I managed. Perhaps the kindest thing to say about “Elmer's Candid Camera” is that it taught everyone what not to do and how not to do it."

== Home Media ==
- VHS 1988 – Cartoon Moviestars: Elmer! - MGM/UA Home Video
- Laserdisc 1988 – Bugs! and Elmer! - MGM/UA Home Video
- Laserdisc 1992 – The Golden Age of Looney Tunes: Volume 2 - MGM/UA Home Video
- VHS 2001 – Looney Tunes: The Collectors Edition, Vol. 11 - Wabbit Tales - Warner Home Video/Columbia House
- DVD 2003 – Looney Tunes Golden Collection: Volume 1 (restored) - Warner Home Video
- DVD 2003 - Looney Tunes Spotlight Collection: Volume 1 (restored) - Warner Home Video
- DVD 2010 – The Essential Bugs Bunny (restored) - Warner Home Video
- Blu-Ray & DVD 2012 – Looney Tunes Platinum Collection: Volume 2 (restored) - Warner Home Video
- Blu-Ray 2020 – Bugs Bunny 80th Anniversary Collection (restored) - Warner Bros. Home Entertainment

== See also ==
- Bugs Bunny filmography
- Elmer Fudd filmography
- Looney Tunes and Merrie Melodies filmography (1940–1949)

Preceded by Hare-um Scare-um	Bugs Bunny prototype Cartoons; 1940	Succeeded by None
