= Tabasco Road =

- Directed by: Robert McKimson
- Story by: Tedd Pierce
- Starring: Mel Blanc
- Edited by: Treg Brown
- Music by: Carl Stalling; Milt Franklyn
- Animation by: Ted Bonnicksen; George Grandpré; Warren Batchelder (uncredited); Russ Dyson (uncredited)
- Layouts by: Robert Gribbroek
- Backgrounds by: Bill Butler
- Color process: Technicolor
- Production company: Warner Bros. Cartoons
- Distributed by: Warner Bros. Pictures
- Release date: July 20, 1957
- Running time: 6:33
- Language: English

Tabasco Road is a 1957 Warner Bros. Looney Tunes cartoon directed by Robert McKimson. The short was released on July 20, 1957, and stars Speedy Gonzales.

It was an Academy Award nominee for best short subject but it lost out to Birds Anonymous (a Merrie Melodies cartoon starring Tweety and Sylvester, the latter of whom is also often paired with Speedy Gonzales). The title is a pun on Tabasco (one of the thirty two federal entities of Mexico) and Erskine Caldwell's novel Tobacco Road (which was later adapted into a play and a movie).

== Synopsis ==
Speedy Gonzales has to save his friends, Pablo and Fernando, from a large hungry alley cat. The trouble is, they are inebriated, and would much rather pick a fight with the cat (and for that matter, any other cat they can find!). Can Speedy save them?

== Plot ==
It is nighttime in a quaint Mexican village. At the local cantina, the bartender is alone as all the customers have gone home for the night, but while he is cleaning up one of the glasses, in a mouse hole nearby, a celebration is being held for Speedy Gonzales, where Speedy is performing the Mexican Hat Dance to the entertainment of the other mice. After a couple of them toast to him being the fastest mouse in all Mexico, Speedy confronts his two friends, Pablo and Fernando, and tells them they have had enough tequila to drink, but after he returns to his dancing, they retrieve two full glasses they had hidden under their sombreros and continue to get drunk. A few hours later, the cantina closes as the lights are turned off, and in the mouse cantina, the drunk guests begin to head home for the night, with Pablo and Fernando leaving together as they drunkenly sing "La Cucaracha" as they walk home, unaware of a large Mexican cat seeing them approach and waits in ambush from a trash can. Back at the cantina, Speedy is leaving, but asks Manuel, the mouse resting against the wall next to the door, if he has seen Pablo and Fernando. Manuel explains they already left, and were heavily drunk as well. Speedy fears they will get into trouble and heads out to find them.

Meanwhile, Pablo and Fernando are confronted by the cat, but in their drunk state, decide to challenge the cat to a fist fight, telling him to "put up your dukes!" The cat chuckles, thinking the mice are crazy, or "muy loco in la cabeza", and prepares to eat them. Speedy soon arrives and sees this, and hits the cat on his foot with a mallet, forcing him to drop the drunk mice. Speedy rescues Pablo and hides him in a sardine tin, but when he goes back to get Fernando, it appears he is too late as the cat already ate him. However, when Speedy returns to the sardine tin, he's surprised to find both Pablo and Fernando there unharmed, and still drunkenly singing. When he tries to talk to them, in their inebriated state, they mistake Speedy for the cat, and Speedy takes Fernando home before coming back for Pablo. After Speedy leaves, however, Fernando climbs out of his house through the open front window, and staggers back to the alley to find Pablo. Speedy arrives just in time to see the cat devour Pablo, but quickly hits the cat on his foot, causing him to scream in pain, before Speedy sticks something in his mouth that causes him to expand from an explosion inside his body. Speedy, concerned that the audience did not see what he did, repeats the chain of events in slow motion: He hits the cat on his foot; as the cat screams, he rescues Pablo, but places him on a mousetrap, forcing Speedy to double back to save Pablo before the trap snaps. He then places Pablo in a jug, corking the lid, then goes back to plant a firecracker on the cat's outstretched tongue, lighting it before getting clear as the cat swallows the lit firecracker and it goes off inside him, leading to his dazed state with smoke coming out of his ears. Afterwards, Speedy goes back to the jug, but finds the bottom had been broken off, and Pablo nowhere to be seen. While Speedy goes to look for him, Fernando stumbles back into the alley and into the cat's mouth, mistaking it for cantina doors. When Speedy confronts him, the cat reveals Fernando on his tongue, who actually taunts the cat and snaps his fingers at him in defiance, before Speedy runs back and forth before hitting the cat on his foot again, leading to him opening his mouth to scream, and Speedy to rescue Fernando and plant another firecracker on the outstretched tongue, causing the cat to moan, "Oh, no...", before the firecracker explodes inside him again, and that gives the cat enough reason to give up and flee the city, finally had enough of Speedy.

Speedy sarcastically moans that Pablo and Fernando have no cat for them to pick a fight with anymore, thinking his drunk friends are safe now, but a cry of "Yeehaw" from them causes Speedy to see that they are picking fights with an alley full of cats, still too drunk to realize their situation. All Speedy can do at that point is grab his sombrero and, breaking the fourth wall, say to the audience, "Here we go again!", before heading back to save his drunk amigos.

== Crew ==
- Story: Tedd Pierce
- Animation: Ted Bonnicksen, George Grandpré
- Layouts: Robert Gribbroek
- Backgrounds: William Butler
- Film Editor: Treg Brown
- Voice Characterizations: Mel Blanc
- Music: Carl Stalling, Milt Franklyn
- Directed by: Robert McKimson

== Home media ==
Tabasco Road is available on disc 3 of Looney Tunes Golden Collection: Volume 4, disc 3 of the Warner Bros. Home Entertainment Academy Awards Collection, and disc 1 of Looney Tunes Platinum Collection: Volume 2.
