= Miss Glory =

1936 film by Fred Avery

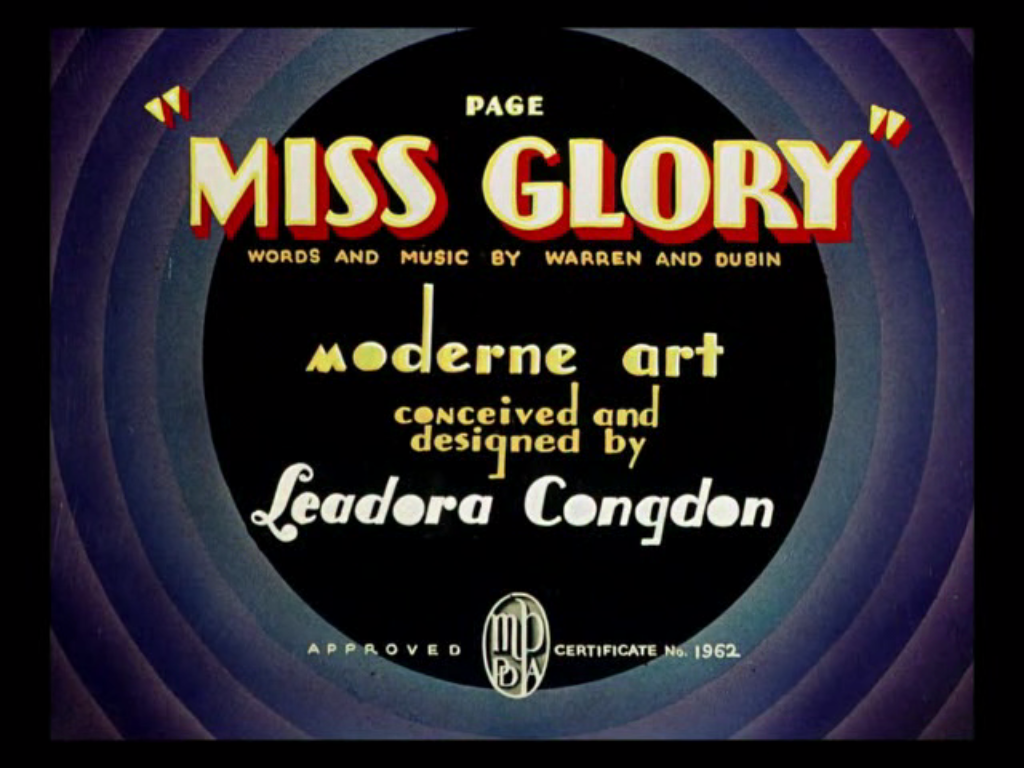
- Title card
- Directed by: Fred Avery (uncredited)
- Produced by: Leon Schlesinger
- Starring: The Varsity Three; Bernice Hansen; Jackie Morrow; Fred Avery
- Music by: Harry Warren; Al Dubin
- Layouts by: Leadora Congdon
- Backgrounds by: Leadora Congdon
- Color process: Technicolor
- Production company: Leon Schlesinger Productions
- Distributed by: Warner Bros. Productions; The Vitaphone Corporation
- Release date: March 7, 1936
- Running time: 7 mins
- Country: United States
- Language: English

Miss Glory, also named Page Miss Glory, is a 1936 American animated comedy short film directed by Fred Avery. The short was released on March 7, 1936. It is the 55th film in the Merrie Melodies series and the first to be directed by Avery, who would become one of the series' most prominent directors until 1942; no staff aside from Leon Schlesinger, Harry Warren and Al Dubin was credited. The film is notable for its extensive use of Art Deco backgrounds and character designs by Chicago artist Leadora Congdon.

== Plot ==
In the Depression-era Midwestern town of Hicksville, excitement brews as locals prepare to welcome Miss Glory. At a local hotel, teenage bellhop Abner waits for her arrival for hours until he falls asleep.

Abner dreams himself to be in Manhattan, working at the high-end high-rise Cosmopolitan Hotel. At the Cosmopolitan, he sings the titular song with the sophisticated staff, pours drinks to customers, and accidentally destroys the dress of an older woman, leaving her to dance with two leaves from a nearby plant. A man demands "service," so Abner and the staff oblige by giving him a large dinner; he leaves after eating only half an olive. Miss Glory's arrival is announced, causing every male member of the staff to neglect their work to greet her. Abner tries to get into the elevator, only to be shut out every single time. He attempts to fix one elevator so he can enter, only for the elevator operator to leave for lunch.

Miss Glory appears as a slim and glamorous woman, accompanied by several hotel staff members. The elevator Abner is in malfunctions and shifts across multiple floors. When he finally arrives at Miss Glory's floor, the door slams on his face again. The elevator throws Abner out of the hotel and onto the street in front of an annoyed streetcar driver, just as he wakes up to find Miss Glory's arrival. When the real Miss Glory is revealed to be a little girl, Abner passes out in shock. Amused by the scene, Glory breaks the fourth wall and, in the style of Jack Benny, declares "play, Don" as the orchestra plays over the closing titles.

== Home media ==
Page Miss Glory is available on Looney Tunes Golden Collection: Volume 6, Disc 4 and Looney Tunes Platinum Collection: Volume 2, Disc 2.
