= Porky in Egypt =

1938 film by Robert Clampett

- Title card
- Directed by: Robert Clampett
- Story by: Ernest Gee
- Produced by: Leon Schlesinger
- Starring: Mel Blanc; Danny Webb
- Music by: Carl W. Stalling
- Animation by: Norman McCabe
- Color process: Black-and-white
- Production company: Leon Schlesinger Productions
- Distributed by: Warner Bros. Pictures; The Vitaphone Corporation
- Release date: November 5, 1938
- Running time: 7 min
- Country: United States
- Language: English

Porky in Egypt is a 1938 American animated comedy short film directed by Robert Clampett. The short was released on November 5, 1938. It is part of the Looney Tunes series and the 48th cartoon to feature Porky Pig.

== Plot ==
It is morning in Egypt and a group of lazy locals gamble. An ugly person disguises himself as a beautiful courtesan while a fire-eater nearby fails his trick. An offer for a trip to see the pyramids in Egypt is shown. The tour then proceeds to leave with a large caravan of camels being used as transportation. Porky then comes running out and chases after the caravan; but he is too late and ends up not being able to catch up to them. He sees an available camel called Humpty Bumpty however, and takes it with the intent of seeing the pyramids.

Porky ends up lost in the desert and eventually he, and weirdly enough, the camel, start to suffer from dehydration. They start seeing various mirages that cause them to go into a dreamlike sequence where Porky and the camel both hallucinate and hear strange voices. The camel then starts acting weird and Porky tries to calm him down, but fails, and the camel grows more and more insane.

Eventually, they run screaming from the desert and back into the town, whereupon they lock themselves inside a safehouse. Humpty believes that they are safe, but Porky is then shown to have similarly lost his mind as he begins laughing hysterically, puts on an oversized bicorne hat with the letter N on it (an obvious allusion to Napoleon as well an obvious reference to his invasion in Egypt) as starts dancing in an exaggerated, chaotic fashion as the cartoon irises out.

== Home media ==
- DVD - Looney Tunes Golden Collection: Volume 3
- Blu-ray/DVD - Looney Tunes Platinum Collection: Volume 2
- DVD - Porky Pig 101

== See also ==
- Porky Pig filmography
- Looney Tunes and Merrie Melodies filmography (1930–1939)
