= Tortoise Wins by a Hare =

1943 film by Robert Clampett

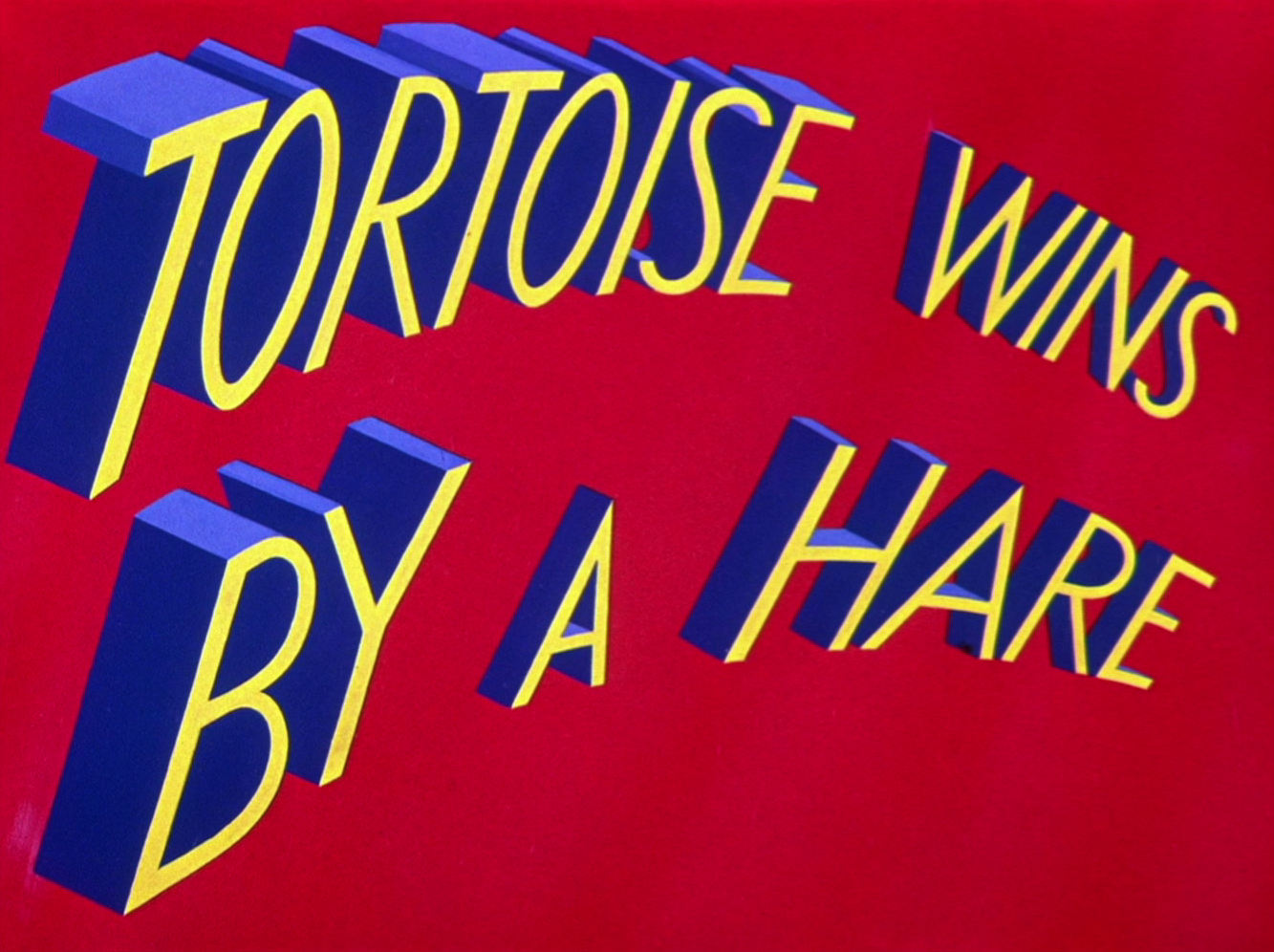
- Title card
- Directed by: Robert Clampett
- Story by: Warren Foster
- Produced by: Leon Schlesinger
- Starring: Mel Blanc
- Music by: Carl W. Stalling
- Animation by: Bob McKimson
- Color process: Technicolor
- Production company: Leon Schlesinger Productions
- Distributed by: Warner Bros. Pictures
- Release date: February 20, 1943
- Running time: 7 min
- Country: United States
- Language: English

Tortoise Wins by a Hare is a 1943 American animated comedy short film directed by Robert Clampett. It is part of the Merrie Melodies series, the nineteenth cartoon to star Bugs Bunny and the second appearance of Cecil Turtle. It is a sequel to 1941's Tortoise Beats Hare. It is also the first short to feature Robert McKimson's design of Bugs Bunny.

== Plot ==
Bugs Bunny, determined to discern the true secret behind Cecil Turtle's previous victory, embarks on a quest for knowledge. Disguising himself as an elderly gentleman, Bugs confronts Cecil at his residence. Despite the turtle's immediate recognition of Bugs' ruse, he humorously entertains the inquiry, attributing his triumph to a fictitious "air-flow chassis" blueprint purportedly enhancing his aerodynamic efficiency while also noting that the design of the rabbit is "all wrong" due to the air resistance applied on the long ears. Cecil further disparages rabbits as intellectually deficient, exacerbating Bugs' frustration.

Undeterred by Cecil's taunts, Bugs endeavors to emulate his opponent's alleged advantage by constructing a similar shell for himself and wearing a rubber cap to cover his ears. Concurrently, a betting frenzy ensues among the rabbit community, pledging unwavering support for Bugs' anticipated victory. However, confusion ensues during the race as Bugs assumes an early lead, prompting misguided attacks from the rabbit mob, mistakenly identifying Bugs as Cecil due to his new attire. Cecil exacerbates the chaos by masquerading as a rabbit, deceiving the mob and further hindering Bugs' progress.

Despite these obstacles, Bugs demonstrates resilience and nearly secures victory until the rabbit mob intervenes, stalling his momentum and facilitating Cecil's triumph. Devastated by the unforeseen turn of events and the realization of inadvertently aiding Cecil's victory once again, Bugs relinquishes his facade, revealing his true identity. In utter shock at what they've done, the mobsters all shoot themselves in the head.

== Voice cast ==
- Mel Blanc as Bugs Bunny, Cecil Turtle, Narrators, Rabbit Bookie, Rabbit Thugs and Mrs. Turtle
- Kent Rogers as Rabbit with Telescope
- Michael Maltese as Various Rabbit Thugs
- Tedd Pierce as Various Rabbit Thugs

== Reception ==
Animation historian Jerry Beck writes, "One of the things that most fans of director Bob Clampett's cartoons relish is that he would do almost anything to create a funny cartoon. That meant he would violate established character personality traits and traditional story points to get laughs. Here, he not only shreds the Aesop fable and Disney's 1935 short The Tortoise and the Hare but also Tex Avery's send-up of this famous race. The results are priceless... Only Clampett could twist his characters into such pretzels, and put them through the emotional wringer, with such hilarious results."

== Home media ==
This short was released, uncut and uncensored, on Looney Tunes Golden Collection: Volume 1 and Looney Tunes Platinum Collection: Volume 2.

== Sources ==
- Dobson, Nichola (2010). "Clampett, Bob". The A to Z of Animation and Cartoons. Scarecrow Press. ISBN 978-1461664024.
- Shull, Michael S.; Wilt, David E. (2004). "Filmography 1943". Doing Their Bit: Wartime American Animated Short Films, 1939-1945. McFarland & Company. ISBN 978-0786481699.

== See also ==
- Tortoise Beats Hare
- Rabbit Transit
- Bugs Bunny filmography
- Looney Tunes and Merrie Melodies filmography (1940–1949)

Preceded by Case of the Missing Hare	Bugs Bunny Cartoons; 1943	Succeeded by Super-Rabbit
