= Development of Bugs Bunny =

The character that would evolve into Bugs Bunny appeared in four cartoon shorts before his first official appearance in Tex Avery's A Wild Hare. While this early version is commonly referred to as "Happy Rabbit", animation historian David Gerstein disputes this, saying that the only usage of the term was from Mel Blanc himself; the name "Bugs's Bunny" was used as early as April 1938, from a model sheet made by Charles Thorson which was used for the short Hare-um Scare-um. Bugs was also mentioned by name from an August 1939 review of the short in the Motion Picture Herald.

Several published first person accounts, encyclopedic references, and Warner Bros.' own published material describe the inception of the name and of the character. A model sheet by Thorson describes this prototype character as "Bugs's Bunny" (note the apostrophe) but in most of the cartoons the character is unnamed.

Virgil Ross, the animator for A Wild Hare describes how the character came to be named in the interview published by Animato! magazine #19. Mel Blanc often told the story of the creation of the character and its name. He suggested that the character be named after the character's initial director, Ben "Bugs" Hardaway. Blanc's own book, That's Not All Folks published by Warner Books in 1988, describes the "tough little stinker" that was the eventual version of the redesigned character as directed by Avery.

Warner Brothers' own published descriptions of the creation of the character's name can be found in Animation Magazine published in 1990. Therein it is described that the Hardaway unit's model sheet came to be known by fellow animators as "Bugs's Bunny".

== Early appearances ==
=== Porky's Hare Hunt ===
Ben Hardaway and Cal Dalton introduced the first version of the character in Porky's Hare Hunt (released April 30, 1938). In the cartoon Porky Pig is hunting and fires at several rabbits. Soon, Porky and his dog meet the rabbit and try to outwit him in the forest. Porky and the rabbit get in a long fight and soon the hare thinks he has won and that the war is over; Porky, however, finds the rabbit and the Bunny doesn't have any brainstorms to protect him. The rabbit shows Porky a photo of himself and of how many children he has with his wife. However, when Porky's about to shoot him, the gun fails.

After Porky attempts to shoot down and procure the rabbit, the rabbit asks Porky: "Do you have a hunting license?" As Porky reaches for his pocket to obtain the document, the hyperactive hare suddenly snatches it out of Porky's grasp, rips it in two, remarks, "Well you haven't got one now...hoohoohoohoohahahahah..hoo hoo hoo ha ha ha!" and makes a getaway by twisting his ears as though they were a helicopter propeller, flying away. Ultimately the rabbit wins when Porky throws dynamite into the cave in which the hare is hiding and the rabbit throws the dynamite back at him. Porky is in the hospital and the rabbit comes to him with some flowers. Porky tells the hare that he'll be out in a few days. The very hyper rabbit then pulls on the leg holders in Porky's bed, adding to his injuries, and runs off into the forest.

=== Prest-O Change-O ===
Chuck Jones later directed the cartoon Prest-O Change-O (released March 25, 1939) that featured the rabbit. In this cartoon two rogue dogs are being pursued by a dog catcher until they hide in an abandoned house. There they encounter a trunk owned by Sham-Fu the magician (unseen). They open it, and all manner of magic tricks come out of the trunk, including his pet rabbit. The rabbit tricks the two dogs repeatedly, causing them endless frustration, until he is bested by the bigger of the two dogs, who bops him with a lampshade.

=== Hare-um Scare-um ===
Schlesinger assigned Hardaway and Dalton to direct the next short, Hare-um Scare-um (released August 12, 1939). It starts with a man reading a newspaper article stating that meat prices have soared (and that customers are sore). Angry, he declares that he will hunt his own meat to get back at the government for the price inflation. He then tells his dog he is going hunting for rabbits.

A rabbit lays a trap for the dog, and the dog gets scared of the sound. The bunny then plays "Guess Who" with the dog, with the dog answering in barks. The hunter then sees rabbits, aims his gun, then runs over to where it was. When he gets there, there is a spinning wheel with rabbit signs. The hunter then sees the hare sleeping. The hunter starts pouring salt on the rabbit's tail, but the rabbit quickly changes position so that the hunter is salting a celery stalk instead. The rabbit starts eating it and says, "Celery, mighty fine nerve tonic. Boy, have I got nerve."

The hare runs in a cave, and the hunter runs after him. Before he reaches the cave, an elevator appears and the hunter collides with it. The rabbit then opens it and says, "Main floor, leather goods, pottery, washing machines and aspirin, going up!" and closes it as the elevator goes up. The elevator floor goes back down, the hare opens it and says, "You don't have to be crazy to do this … but it sure helps," closes it and the elevator goes down. The bunny then dresses in girl-dog drag. The dog then sees the rabbit in drag; he thinks it is a dog, then he notices it is the rabbit.

The hare then pretends he is a policeman, and the hunter then finds the rabbit. He explains to the hunter how poor he is. He then shocks the hunter, who falls to the ground. The hunter then tells the now-hiding hare he can whip the rabbit and his whole family, then he's suddenly surrounded by a lot of rabbits that look like the first rabbit.

=== Elmer's Candid Camera ===
Jones directed the next cartoon, Elmer's Candid Camera (released March 2, 1940) which features the first appearance of a redesigned Elmer Fudd. In this cartoon, Elmer has come to the country to photograph wildlife. As he tries to photograph a rabbit, the rabbit finds him a convenient victim to harass. This tormenting eventually drives Elmer insane, causing him to jump into a lake and nearly drown. The rabbit saves him, ensures that Elmer is all right now - and then kicks him straight back into the lake.

== Full form ==
Elmer's Candid Camera was followed by Tex Avery's A Wild Hare, released July 27, 1940, which is considered the debut of Bugs Bunny in full. Avery changed several of the rabbit's characteristics: his voice became a cross between the Bronx and Brooklyn accents, the color of his gloves became white, as did the color of his mouth, and his ears were changed slightly as well. According to Avery in an interview in 1974, Bugs' voice was influenced by Frank McHugh. The cartoon was so successful that Warner Bros. decided to keep him on as a recurring character, eventually becoming the studio's most popular cartoon character. The character's name, previously only used on model sheets, became the official all-purpose name as well, with one modification: the apostrophe and second "s" was dropped from his first name (now pronounced "bugs" rather than "bugs-es"). A title card saying "featuring Bugs Bunny" was inserted into his next appearance, Elmer's Pet Rabbit, after initial production of that cartoon wrapped up, though that cartoon showed Bugs with many of his pre-Wild Hare characteristics.

Bugs Bunny's personality continued to evolve over the years, from a largely "screwball" character (a la Daffy Duck), to a mixture of "screwball" and "everyman" characteristics. Bugs' design would also receive a definitive redesign in 1943 by animator Robert McKimson for the Bob Clampett-directed short Tortoise Wins by a Hare. Bugs' defined look would be adopted by each unit slowly (though Chuck Jones, McKimson and Friz Freleng had slight variations). Bugs' look was modified again for the 2011 series The Looney Tunes Show, for the 2015 series Wabbit (retooled as New Looney Tunes in the second season), and for Looney Tunes Cartoons in 2020, which returns to using the yellow gloves from the earliest color appearances.

== Cameos ==
- Bugs' earlier incarnation made a cameo in Patient Porky, starring Porky and directed by Bob Clampett. The short was released roughly a month after Avery's A Wild Hare.
- In the Touchstone Pictures and Amblin Entertainment film, Who Framed Roger Rabbit, the character can be seen walking through the Maroon Cartoon studio lot for three-quarters of a second before the shot changes.
- In a deleted sequence from the film Looney Tunes: Back in Action, Bugs Bunny, upon being zapped by a magical idol, transforms into the earliest incarnation of his character. This sequence can be seen in the "Deleted Scenes" featurette on the DVD release.
