= Crying for the Carolines =

1930 film by Neil McGuire

- Title card
- Directed by: Neil McGuire
- Produced by: Leon Schlesinger
- Starring: Milton Charles
- Music by: Frank Marsales
- Production company: Leon Schlesinger Productions
- Distributed by: Warner Bros. Pictures; The Vitaphone Corporation
- Release date: December 1930
- Running time: 5:45
- Country: United States
- Language: English

Crying for the Carolines is a 1930 American short musical film directed by Neil McGuire. It is the first short film to be produced solely by Leon Schlesinger Productions for Warner Bros. Pictures. The theme for this short film is played on the Wurlitzer organ by Milton Charles, a theatre organist during the silent era of film. He is dubbed the 'Singing Organist' in the film.

The film, which was recorded on Western Electric apparatus, was the only one made in a planned series called Spooney Melodies, which was rechristened Song'nata in future films, none of which have been preserved. The film is a music video to advertise the song sung by Charles. The organ music was written by Frank Marsales, who would go on to write the musical arrangements for the Merrie Melodies series, including the cartoon Smile, Darn Ya, Smile!

== Plot ==
The film in its entirety

The film opens, with art deco style animation, set to organ music. It cuts to Charles playing the organ and singing Cryin' for the Carolines, a song written by Harry Warren, Sam Lewis, and Joe Young the same year. The animation which is shown throughout the film includes, a forest, a city and a sun shining over a country plain. Milton Charles is portrayed in voice and live action footage throughout the short, as he sings the song.

== Background ==
The song, Cryin' for the Carolines, was originally featured in the 1930 Warner Bros. film Spring is Here. The song was issued on the sound system Vitaphone, accomplished with a record player which played a disk in time with the projector. This would be higher quality than sound-on-film. In the film, the song was sung by The Brox Sisters.

== Availability ==
The planned series was short-lived, with Warner Bros. Pictures instead going for the Merrie Melodies series, beginning with 1931's Lady, Play Your Mandolin! An edited version of this short was featured in the ToonHeads episode: "The Lost Cartoons". The full short is available on disc 3 of the Looney Tunes Golden Collection: Volume 6 DVD set and on disc 3 of the Looney Tunes Platinum Collection: Volume 2 Blu-ray set.

== Reception ==
Crying for the Carolines was reviewed by the magazine Photoplay in its 1930 December issue. The magazine spoke positively about the film, citing that the film is a "distinct relief from the monotony of many sound shorts". The magazine also said that the short is notable for the "beauty of the results obtained", from the painting and the drawings featured in the film, "as well as the novelty of the film."
