= Birdy and the Beast =

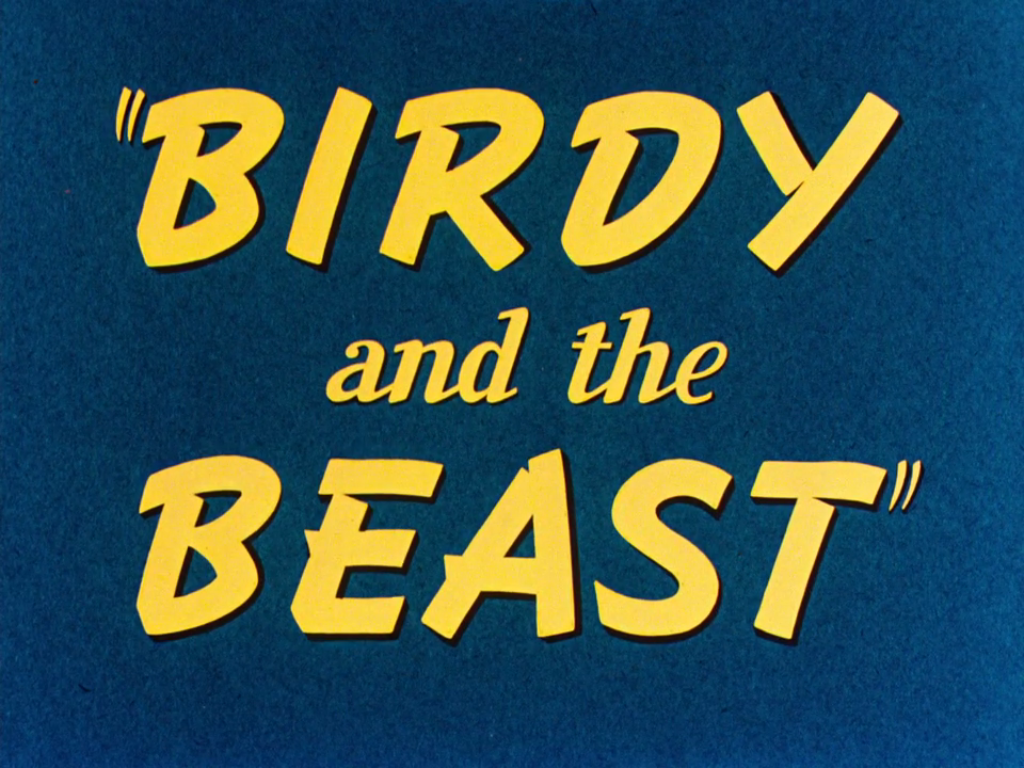
- Title card
- Directed by: Robert Clampett
- Story by: Warren Foster
- Produced by: Leon Schlesinger
- Music by: Carl W. Stalling
- Animation by: Tom McKimson
- Color process: Technicolor
- Production company: Leon Schlesinger Productions
- Distributed by: Warner Bros. Pictures
- Release date: August 19, 1944
- Running time: 7:33
- Country: United States
- Language: English

Birdy and the Beast is a 1944 Warner Bros. Merrie Melodies directed by Bob Clampett. The short was released on August 19, 1944, and stars Tweety.

== Plot ==
Tweety is sitting in his nest, when a cat watches him. Tweety flies off and the cat chases after him. But, the cat doesn't have the ability to fly, so instead he falls to the ground, while Tweety lies down on a cloud. The bird then says, "Oh, the poor titty-tat (kitty-cat). He falled down and go... BOOM!!" (on the word BOOM!, Tweety yells at the top of his lungs) and smiles, then he jumps down and lands on the cat.

The cat attempts to chase Tweety, but Tweety scurries away. Tweety tries to fool the cat by hiding in a bulldog's dish. The cat comes in and starts looking in the bulldog's dish. The bulldog makes his appearance and growls at the cat, but the feline hits the dog with the bowl. The dog chases the cat (with Tweety following the bulldog) until the leash attached to the dog's collar yanks him to the ground, with his face scrunched in. The bulldog says to the audience, "This shouldn't even happen to a dog," and then pulls his collar off.

Tweety wanders and ends up in the cat's mouth, while the cat is looking for the bird. Tweety sets the cat's mouth on fire by holding a match in it. As the cat reactively jumps up from the fire and hits his head on top of an open fence railing, Tweety helps the cat by using a hose and putting out the fire. However, when he fires the hose (by now wearing a firefighter's hat) it turns out that it is connected to a gas (petrol) can, and gasoline goes into the cat's mouth, causing him to explode. Tweety then says, "Oh, the poor putty tat got hot as a firecracker." (A suspenseful drum roll.) "He blew up and go... boom."

The cat survives, but he's still out to get Tweety. When he arrives at the bottom of the tree, he becomes a nest. Tweety attempts to get into it, but a hen, wanting to lay her own eggs, causes him to get off. When she's finished, she flies off. The cat also appears and his mouth is full of nothing but eggs. He attempts to catch Tweety once again but fails, then Tweety fakes his screaming and sets off a hand grenade with its pin pulled next to him. Thinking it was the bird itself, the cat grabs the grenade. The real Tweety says, "He got it and he can have it." The cat blows up and Tweety then confesses, "You know, I get rid of more putty tats that way!", then draws a line on the tree of how many cats he had gotten rid of.

== Home media ==
Birdy and the Beast is available uncut and digitally remastered on the Looney Tunes Platinum Collection: Volume 2 DVD and Blu-Ray sets.

== See also ==
- Looney Tunes and Merrie Melodies filmography (1940–1949)
