= Mr. Hook =

American animated cartoon character

Mr. Hook (Also referred to as Seaman Hook or just Hook) is the title character of a series of American animated cartoon shorts produced between 1943 and 1945 during World War II for the US Navy. The series included four shorts, with the first produced by Walter Lantz Productions in Technicolor and the remaining three produced by Warner Bros. Cartoons in black and white.

The character was designed by Hank Ketcham. Unlike the Private Snafu series, which was created as an instructional film series, Mr. Hook was created exclusively as propaganda to encourage Navy personnel to purchase war bonds.

== Cartoons ==
=== Take Heed Mr. Tojo ===
Directed by James Culhane, the cartoon takes place in the year 1953. Hook tells his son a story when he was a sailor a decade prior, and how war bonds helped him defeat a lone Japanese fighter pilot from attacking his aircraft carrier.

Take Heed Mr. Tojo is the only Hook short to be produced by Walter Lantz Productions before production was moved to Warner Bros. Cartoons. Hook was voiced by Dick Nelson, and it was the only time he voiced the character.

=== The Return of Mr. Hook ===
Directed by Robert McKimson, Hook informs a few skeptical seamen of his "post war plans" once the war is over. Due to him saving war bonds, he is able to afford luxury items such as new clothes, a home, and a wedding. Hook ends up convincing his fellow seamen, as they are later seen waiting for the war bond officer.

This cartoon is notably the first short directed by McKimson, who had previously worked as an animator up to that point. Mr. Hook is also voiced now by Arthur Lake, best known for portraying Dagwood Bumstead in the Blondie theatrical film series.

=== Tokyo Woes ===
Directed by Bob Clampett, the short lampoons the actual Tokyo Rose propaganda radio broadcasts. The titular host in question is seen encouraging naval men to not bother saving up war bonds, supported by a fake American POW impersonating Private Sad Sack (with Mel Blanc providing the same Porky Pig-esque voice he given the character in actual radio appearances). Mr. Hook responds by firing a shell to Japan containing a sentient war bond, and some bombs. The sentient war bond from later returns to Hook after the war to pay him for his due diligence.

=== The Good Egg ===
Directed by Chuck Jones, Mr. Hook is woken up in the middle of the night by his consciences, who are fighting whether he should cash in his war bonds now or save them until the wars ends. Eventually, Hook's good conscience prevails and tells Hook the benefits of saving his bonds, such as a new home, clothes, spending money, etc.

The short is not to be confused with the 1939 cartoon of the same name, which was also directed by Jones.

== Films ==
The Return of Mr Hook

Tokyo Woes

The Good Egg
