= Hiawatha's Rabbit Hunt =

1941 film by Isadore Freleng

- Original title card
- Directed by: Isadore Freleng
- Story by: Michael Maltese
- Produced by: Leon Schlesinger
- Starring: Mel Blanc
- Music by: Carl W. Stalling
- Animation by: Gil Turner
- Color process: Technicolor
- Production company: Leon Schlesinger Productions
- Distributed by: Warner Bros. Pictures
- Release date: June 7, 1941
- Running time: 7 min
- Country: United States
- Language: English

Hiawatha's Rabbit Hunt is a 1941 American animated comedy short film directed by Isadore Freleng. It is part of the Merrie Melodies series and the eighth cartoon to feature Bugs Bunny. This film was nominated for the Academy Award for Best Short Subject (cartoons), but lost to Walt Disney Productions' Lend a Paw (a plot point which would figure into What's Cookin' Doc?). The short makes several direct references to The Song of Hiawatha, an epic poem by Henry Wadsworth Longfellow. It was re-released as a "Blue Ribbon" reissue in 1944, the last Bugs Bunny cartoon to be reissued before 1948.

== Plot ==
Bugs is reading an abridged version of The Song of Hiawatha out loud to himself and the saga turns real as a pint-sized, Elmer Fudd-like Hiawatha (minus the speech impediment) turns up, paddling his canoe. Hiawatha is looking for a rabbit for his dinner. Hiawatha manages to trick Bugs into thinking he is preparing a hot bath for him. It is actually a cooking pot, which Bugs quickly vacates once Hiawatha casually mentions that he is having rabbit stew for supper. Bugs tricks Hiawatha into detouring and wasting arrows, ultimately leading him to fall off a cliff. As Bugs smugly narrates the end of the poem, he does not account for Hiawatha sailing to the sunset near him; Hiawatha has the last laugh by returning to kiss Bugs out of spite and sailing to the sunset before Bugs finishes the poem.

== Voice Cast ==
- Mel Blanc as Bugs Bunny / Hiawatha (sped up)

== Reception ==
The Film Daily called the short a "very funny cartoon", saying, "the result is a howl from start to finish. The serious-minded Indian's efforts to catch the screwball rabbit for stewing purposes makes a lively and comical race. Bugs Bunny gets better and funnier with every screen appearance." This cartoon is listed among the 100 greatest Looney Tunes productions.

== Home media ==
- VHS 1986 - Viddy-Oh! For Kids Cartoon Festival: Bugs Bunny Cartoon Festival Featuring "Little Red Riding Rabbit" (Blue Ribbon) - MGM/UA Home Video
- Laserdisc 1992 - The Golden Age of Looney Tunes: Volume 2 (Blue Ribbon) - MGM/UA Home Video
- DVD 2006 - The Maltese Falcon 3-Disc Special Edition (extra, unrestored with original titles) - Warner Home Video
- DVD 2008 - Warner Bros. Home Entertainment Academy Awards Animation Collection (restored with original titles) - Warner Home Video
- Blu-Ray 2010 - The Maltese Falcon (extra, unrestored with original titles) - Warner Home Video
- Blu-Ray & DVD 2014 - Looney Tunes Platinum Collection: Volume 3 (restored with original titles) - Warner Home Video

== See also ==
- Bugs Bunny filmography
- Looney Tunes and Merrie Melodies filmography (1940–1949)

== Notes ==
Hiawatha's Rabbit Hunt was one of the 12 Bugs Bunny cartoons that were pulled out of Cartoon Network's June Bugs 2001 marathon by order of AOL Time Warner due to having a negative caricature of a Native American.

Preceded by Tortoise Beats Hare	Bugs Bunny Cartoons; 1941	Succeeded by The Heckling Hare
