= Elmer's Pet Rabbit =

1941 film by Charles M. Jones

- Title card
- Directed by: Charles M. Jones
- Story by: Rich Hogan
- Produced by: Leon Schlesinger
- Starring: Arthur Q. Bryan; Mel Blanc
- Music by: Carl W. Stalling
- Animation by: Rudy Larriva
- Color process: Technicolor
- Production company: Leon Schlesinger Productions
- Distributed by: Warner Bros. Pictures
- Release date: January 4, 1941
- Running time: 7 min
- Country: United States
- Language: English

Elmer's Pet Rabbit is a 1941 American animated comedy short film directed by Charles M. Jones. The short was released on January 4, 1941. It is part of the Merrie Melodies series, the thirteenth cartoon to feature Elmer Fudd and the sixth cartoon to feature Bugs Bunny, who is named as such for the first time in this film.

== Plot ==
Elmer walks happily and spots a pet shop who sells Bugs Bunny discounted from $150 to 98 cents, who is "guaranteed to be thoughtful, considerate, gentle". Disregarding the warning signs of extremely persuasive signs, he decides to buy Bugs as a pet. Bugs berates Elmer for purchasing him, only to be locked in a cage at Elmer's garden against his will.

At night, Bugs begrudgingly eats the vegetables Elmer offers him. He easily escapes from the cage just to enter Elmer's house, turn on the lights and trick Elmer into serenading him. Bugs then stops Elmer from taking a shower, causing him to be thrown out repeatedly into a bathtub. He exploits the opportunity to fake being drowned by Elmer, causing him to react emotionally. Bugs takes over Elmer's room and sleeps; Elmer angers him by turning on the lights, causing him to beat up Bugs in a violent off-screen confrontation and chase him out of the house, destroying the room in the process. He returns to find Bugs in the destroyed bed again, demanding the lights be turned off.

== Voice Cast ==
- Mel Blanc as Bugs Bunny
- Arthur Q. Bryan as Elmer Fudd

== Home media ==
- VHS 1986 - Viddy-Oh! For Kids Cartoon Festivals: Elmer Fudd Cartoon Festival Featuring "An Itch in Time" - MGM/UA Home Video
- VHS 1990 - Bugs Bunny Collection: Bugs Bunny on Parade - MGM/UA Home Video
- Laserdisc 1992 - The Golden Age of Looney Tunes: Volume 2 - MGM/UA Home Video
- VHS 2001 - Looney Tunes: The Collector's Edition, Vol. 11 - Wabbit Tales - Warner Home Video/Columbia House
- Blu-Ray 2024 - Looney Tunes Collector's Choice: Volume 3 (restored) - Warner Archive Collection

== See also ==
- Bugs Bunny filmography
- Elmer Fudd filmography
- Looney Tunes and Merrie Melodies filmography (1940–1949)

Preceded by A Wild Hare	Bugs Bunny Cartoons; 1941	Succeeded by Tortoise Beats Hare
