= Martha Sigall =

- Born: Martha Goldman Sigall; April 17, 1917; Buffalo, New York, U.S.
- Died: December 13, 2014 (aged 97); Los Angeles, California, U.S.
- Occupation: Cel painter
- Spouse: Sol Sigall (m. 1946)

Martha Goldman Sigall (April 17, 1917 – December 13, 2014) was an American inker and painter who worked in the Hollywood animation industry for 53 years.

Sigall moved to California from Buffalo, New York, in 1926 and by chance lived around the corner from Leon Schlesinger's Pacific Title and Art company. From about the age of 12, she ran errands for the staff there and was put to work as an apprentice painter on July 13, 1936 at Leon Schlesinger Productions, home of Looney Tunes and Merrie Melodies.

Sigall worked first as a cel painter, then later as an inker until 1944. After leaving Schlesinger, she worked for Graphic Films, a small animation house in Hollywood. Sigall went on to work for MGM studios in the cartoon unit, and then became an assistant in the camera room. She eventually compiled over fifty years in the business.

Sigall wrote a memoir, Living Life Inside The Lines: Tales from the Golden Age of Animation (University Press of Mississippi, 2005). Her book explores the creation of such characters as Bugs Bunny, Tweety and Road Runner. Sigall has also contributed commentary to the Looney Tunes - Golden Collection, Volume One DVD set, along with Jerry Beck.

She was part of several documentaries. One, made by Teleductions, called Cartoons Go to War. Another was Extremes and Inbetweens: A Tribute to Chuck Jones.

In 2004, Sigall received the June Foray Award from ASIFA-Hollywood for her lifetime of work in the animation field.

In 2010, Sigall helped solve the mystery of some vintage production cels on the PBS series History Detectives.

Sigall died on December 13, 2014, aged 97.
