= A Wild Hare =

1940 film by Fred Avery

- Title card
- Directed by: Fred Avery
- Story by: Rich Hogan
- Produced by: Leon Schlesinger
- Starring: Mel Blanc; Arthur Q. Bryan; Marion Darlington
- Music by: Carl W. Stalling
- Animation by: Virgil Ross
- Color process: Technicolor
- Production company: Leon Schlesinger Productions
- Distributed by: Warner Bros. Pictures
- Release date: July 27, 1940
- Running time: 8 min
- Country: United States
- Language: English

A Wild Hare is a 1940 American animated comedy short film directed by Fred Avery. It was released on July 27, 1940. It is part of the Merrie Melodies series, the twelfth cartoon to feature Elmer Fudd and the fifth cartoon to feature a character later to be named Bugs Bunny. The film defined Bugs' personality and Brooklyn-Bronx voice, previously used as a generic humorous voice in Avery's cartoons. It was re-released as a "Blue Ribbon" reissue in 1944 as The Wild Hare. Warner Bros. considers it to be Bugs' official debut, despite numerous established appearances in the series.

In a rare promotional broadcast, A Wild Hare was loosely adapted for the radio as a sketch performed by Mel Blanc and Arthur Q. Bryan on the April 11, 1941, edition of The Al Pearce Show. The sketch was followed by a scripted interview with Leon Schlesinger.

== Plot ==
Bugs makes his first appearance in this design while Elmer foolishly digs a hole

Elmer Fudd hunts for rabbits and finds a rabbit hole, using a carrot to lure him. The rabbit uses his fingers to detect his surroundings, realizing that Elmer can be quickly fooled. He provokes Elmer by tying his shotgun into a ribbon. He emerges from his hole as Elmer digs one and converses with Elmer, who does not recognize him as a rabbit despite knowing its physical characteristics. The rabbit literally has to spell it out to Elmer to have him realize that the rabbit is talking to him. He then uses a skunk to lure Elmer; who entertains the skunk with his stupidity as he is unable to recognize a rabbit again.

Elmer finally gets his hands on the rabbit and attempts to shoot him. His mercy and poor aim inadvertently leads to the rabbit exploiting it to fake his death, though the rabbit also considerately moves aside to avoid the casualty of nearby birds. Convinced that he has killed the rabbit and is unable to face the consequences of the killing, Elmer is kicked from behind by the rabbit, humbling him as he runs away humiliated. The rabbit comments on Elmer's stupidity as he walks into his hole.

== Voice cast ==
Note: All voice actors are uncredited

- Mel Blanc as Bugs Bunny / Skunk
- Arthur Q. Bryan as Elmer Fudd
- Marion Darlington as Birds Whistling

== Production ==
Bob Clampett claimed in the interview with Michael Barrier and Bugs Bunny: Superstar that his depiction of Bugs was inspired by the film It Happened One Night, with Clark Gable's character chewing a carrot in a non-chalant stance while talking to Claudette Colbert's character about hitchhiking, however Avery denied this in the Avery-Jones letter, outright questioning it. However, this was the inspiration for the prototypical version that is seen in Porky's Hare Hunt, according to Friz Freleng. Also, Freleng says that Gable's character was not the inspiration, but Roscoe Karns's character, Oscar Shapeley, was the partial inspiration for the version created by Avery.

The line "What's up, Doc?" was added by director Tex Avery for this film. Avery explained later that it was a common expression in Texas where he was from, and he did not think much of the phrase.

== Reception ==
Animator Mark Kausler writes, "A Wild Hare marks the appearance of the key element that makes Bugs Bunny's personality coalesce, even though the hare is not named in the film. That element: the underplayed, tough, Brooklyn-Bronx voice that Mel Blanc gave to the rabbit in this cartoon. The humor of the "What's up, doc?" line and the "You know, you look just like a wabbit" routines seem a little familiar to us-those bits were done so much faster and better in later cartoons. However, the personalities of the outrageously stupid Fudd and the resourceful Bugs dominate the story and keep us entertained."

== Home media ==
- VHS 1986 - Bugs Bunny and Elmer Fudd Cartoon Festival Featuring "Wabbit Twouble" (Blue Ribbon) - MGM/UA Home Video
- VHS 1991 - Bugs Bunny Collection: Here Comes Bugs (Blue Ribbon) - MGM/UA Home Video
- Laserdisc 1991 - The Golden Age of Looney Tunes: Volume 1 (Blue Ribbon) - MGM/UA Home Video
- VHS 1992 - The Golden Age of Looney Tunes, Vol. 2: Firsts (Blue Ribbon) - MGM/UA Home Video
- Laserdisc 1994 - The Golden Age of Looney Tunes: Volume 4 (original titles) - MGM/UA Home Video
- DVD 2005 - Looney Tunes Golden Collection: Volume 3 (extra, unrestored with original titles) - Warner Home Video
- DVD 2006 - Looney Tunes Golden Collection: Volume 4 (extra, unrestored, Blue Ribbon) - Warner Home Video
- DVD 2007 - Torrid Zone (extra, unrestored, Blue Ribbon version) - Warner Home Video
- DVD 2008 - Warner Bros. Home Entertainment Academy Awards Animation Collection (restored with original titles) - Warner Home Video
- DVD 2010 - The Essential Bugs Bunny (restored with original titles) - Warner Home Video
- Blu-ray & DVD 2012 - Looney Tunes Platinum Collection: Volume 2 (restored with original titles) - Warner Home Video
- Blu-ray 2020 - Bugs Bunny 80th Anniversary Collection (restored with original titles) - Warner Bros. Home Entertainment
- Blu-ray 2026 - Torrid Zone (extra, restored with original titles) - Warner Archive Collection

=== Streaming ===
- Boomerang app (2018-2024)
- HBO Max (2020-2025)
- Tubi (2025 - Present)

== Notes ==
- The film was nominated for an Academy Award for Best Short Subject: Cartoons but lost to "The Milky Way", another MGM Rudolf Ising production.
- When the film was reissued as a Blue Ribbon release on June 17, 1944, four years after its original release, it was retitled The Wild Hare. Also, during the "guess who" sequence, the name "Cawole Wombard" was redubbed, since Lombard died in a plane crash in January 1942, and was replaced by "Bawbawa Stanwyck".
- In 2016, the film was shortlisted for the 1941 Retro-Hugo Award for Best Dramatic Presentation, Short Form.

== See also ==
- Bugs Bunny filmography
- Elmer Fudd filmography
- Looney Tunes and Merrie Melodies filmography (1940–1949)

Preceded by None - first short	Bugs Bunny Cartoons; 1940	Succeeded by Elmer's Pet Rabbit
