= Rabbit Transit (film) =

1947 animated short film by Friz Freleng

- Title card
- Directed by: Friz Freleng
- Story by: Michael Maltese; Tedd Pierce
- Starring: Mel Blanc
- Music by: Carl W. Stalling
- Animation by: Manuel Perez; Ken Champin; Virgil Ross; Gerry Chiniquy; A. C. Gamer
- Layouts by: Hawley Pratt
- Backgrounds by: Philip DeGuard
- Color process: Technicolor
- Production company: Warner Bros. Cartoons
- Distributed by: Warner Bros. Pictures; The Vitaphone Corporation
- Release date: May 10, 1947
- Running time: 8:04
- Language: English

Rabbit Transit is a 1947 Looney Tunes cartoon, directed by Friz Freleng. The short was released on May 10, 1947, and features Bugs Bunny and Cecil Turtle in their third and final original cartoon together. The title is a play on "rapid transit".

== Plot ==
Bugs Bunny engages in a heated debate with Cecil Turtle while relaxing in a steam bath, spurred by their reflection on the classic fable of "The Tortoise and the Hare". This debate escalates into a challenge, prompting Bugs to participate in a race against Cecil, with both parties agreeing to uphold fair play.

However, Cecil unveils an unexpected advantage by revealing his rocket-propelled shell, disrupting Bugs' initial confidence. Undeterred, Bugs employs various tactics to counter Cecil's newfound speed, including attempts to disable the rocket mechanism and construct a deceptive tunnel along the racecourse.

Despite Bugs' efforts, Cecil maintains his lead, prompting Bugs to make a final, desperate sprint to the finish line. In a surprising turn, Cecil graciously relinquishes his advantage, allowing Bugs to claim victory. However, Bugs' triumph proves to be Pyrrhic, as he discovers he has violated speed regulations, Bugs then becomes livid and tries to attack Cecil while the police takes Bugs away. Cecil closes out the cartoon with one of Bugs' catchphrases: "Ain't I a stinker?"

== See also ==
- Bugs Bunny filmography
- Looney Tunes and Merrie Melodies filmography (1940–1949)

Preceded by Rhapsody Rabbit	Bugs Bunny Cartoons; 1947	Succeeded by A Hare Grows in Manhattan
