= Merrie Melodies =

Animated film series

- One of the series' classic title cards, as seen on several 1942-1944 releases
- Directed by: Tex Avery; Bob Clampett; Arthur Davis; Friz Freleng; Hugh Harman; Rudolf Ising; Chuck Jones; Robert McKimson; Frank Tashlin; (and others)
- Story by: Warren Foster; Tedd Pierce; Michael Maltese; (as others)
- Based on: Looney Tunes
- Produced by: Hugh Harman; Rudolf Ising; Leon Schlesinger; Eddie Selzer; John Burton; David H. DePatie; Friz Freleng; William L. Hendricks
- Starring: Mel Blanc; June Foray; Arthur Q. Bryan; Bea Benaderet; Stan Freberg; (and others)
- Music by: Carl Stalling; Milt Franklyn; William Lava; (and others)
- Animation by: Ken Harris; Rod Scribner; Gerry Chiniquy; Virgil Ross; Ben Washam; Bill Melendez; (and others)
- Layouts by: Maurice Noble; Hawley Pratt; Robert Gribbroek; (and others)
- Backgrounds by: Paul Julian; Pete Alvarado; Philip DeGuard; (and others)
- Color process: Black-and-white (1931–1934); 2-strip Technicolor (1934–1935); 3-strip Technicolor (1935–1997); Cinecolor (1934; 1947–1948)
- Production companies: Harman-Ising Productions (1931–1933); Leon Schlesinger Productions (1933–1944); Warner Bros. Cartoons (1944–1964); DePatie–Freleng Enterprises (1964–1967; 1979–1980); Format Productions (1965–1967); Warner Bros.–Seven Arts Animation (1967–1969); Chuck Jones Productions (1980); Warner Bros. Animation (1988–1997)
- Distributed by: Warner Bros. Pictures; The Vitaphone Corporation; Vitagraph Company of America
- Release dates: August 2, 1931 — June 13, 1997
- Running time: 6–10 minutes (one reel)
- Country: United States
- Language: English

Merrie Melodies is an American animated comedy short film series distributed by Warner Bros. Pictures. It was part of the Looney Tunes franchise and featured many of the same characters. Originally produced from 1931 to 1969 during the Golden Age of American animation, Merrie Melodies was revived in 1979 with new shorts being sporadically released until 1997. Merrie Melodies originally placed emphasis on one-shot color films in comparison to the black-and-white Looney Tunes films. After Bugs Bunny became the breakout character of Merrie Melodies and Looney Tunes transitioned to color production in the early 1940s, the two series gradually lost their distinctions and shorts were assigned to each series randomly.

Merrie Melodies was originally produced by Harman-Ising Productions from 1931 to 1933 and Leon Schlesinger Productions from 1933 to 1944. Schlesinger sold his studio to Warner Bros. in 1944, and the newly renamed Warner Bros. Cartoons continued production until 1963. It was outsourced to DePatie–Freleng Enterprises and Format Productions from 1964 to 1967, and Warner Bros.-Seven Arts Animation resumed production for its final two years of the golden age era. When the series was revived in 1979, DePatie–Freleng produced new shorts briefly, but they were replaced by Chuck Jones Productions the following year. During its final years, the series was produced by Warner Bros. Animation.

The films Tweetie Pie, Speedy Gonzales, and Birds Anonymous each won the Academy Award for Best Animated Short Film and another three (Duck Amuck, One Froggy Evening, and What's Opera, Doc?) have been inducted into the National Film Registry of the Library of Congress.

In 2013, TV Guide ranked the Warner Bros. Cartoons (ranked as Looney Tunes) the third Greatest Cartoon of All Time (out of 60), one of only six film series to make the list (the other five being the Pink Panther series, Popeye the Sailor, Mighty Mouse, Woody Woodpecker and Tom and Jerry).

== Background ==
Producer Leon Schlesinger had already produced the music-based Looney Tunes series, and its success prompted him to try to sell a sister series to Warner Bros. Pictures. His selling point was that the new cartoons would feature music from the soundtracks of Warner Bros. films, and would thus serve as advertisements for Warner Bros. recordings and sheet music. The studio agreed, and Schlesinger dubbed the series Merrie Melodies. Walt Disney Productions had already scored with their Silly Symphonies. Since cartoon production usually began with a soundtrack, animating a piece of music made it easier to devise plot elements and even characters.

The origins of the Merrie Melodies series begin with the failure of a live-action series of musical shorts called Spooney Melodies, which featured popular songs of the day. These shorts included segments with a popular artist singing along with appropriate background sequences. Warner Bros. wanted to promote this music because they had recently acquired (in 1930) the ownership of Brunswick Records along with four music publishers for US$28 million. Because of the success of their Looney Tunes series, Warner Bros. decided to develop a new series of animated musical shorts called Merrie Melodies. Hugh Harman and Rudolf Ising led the development. It was meant to be a series of musical cartoons that featured hit songs of the day, especially those then owned by Warner Bros. and featured in their musical films. In 1931, many of the shorts featured the orchestra of Abe Lyman.

The first cartoon of the new Merrie Melodies series was Lady, Play Your Mandolin!, released in 1931. Ising attempted to introduce several characters in his Merrie Melodies films, such as Piggy, Foxy, and Goopy Geer. Eventually however, the series continued without any recurring characters. The shorts proved to be enormously popular with the public. In 1932, a Merrie Melodies cartoon, entitled It's Got Me Again!, was nominated for the first Academy Award to be given for animation.

When Harman and Ising left Warner Bros., in 1933, they took with them all rights to the characters they had created. Leon Schlesinger had to negotiate with them to keep the rights to the name Merrie Melodies, as well as for the right to use the slogan, "So Long Folks", at the end of the cartoons. In 1934, Schlesinger produced his first color Merrie Melodies shorts, Honeymoon Hotel and Beauty and the Beast, which were produced in two-strip Cinecolor (Disney then had exclusive animation rights to the richer three-strip Technicolor process). Their success convinced Schlesinger to produce all future Merrie Melodies shorts in color, using two-strip Technicolor. Looney Tunes continued in black-and-white until 1943. In 1934, the cartoons began to end with the slogan "That's all, Folks!" which had previously only been used on the Looney Tunes series. The old slogan "So Long, Folks!" was completely abandoned at this time. In 1936, Merrie Melodies began using the "bulls-eye" opening and closing title sequences; beginning in 1942, Looney Tunes used the same titles, usually with thicker rings. By 1936, Disney's exclusivity on the three-color Technicolor process ended, allowing Merrie Melodies a full color palette for the first time, hence the use of the blue concentric rings (as a technical test) for the rest of the 1935–36 season and the 1936–37 season. The Warner Bros. shield was changed to cyan later that year before definitely changing back to red in 1938.

Contractually, Merrie Melodies cartoons were obligated to include at least one full chorus from a Warner Bros. song. Warner Bros. requested that these songs be performed by name bands whenever possible, but this lasted only through the first few shorts. The policy annoyed the animators of Merrie Melodies, since the songs often interrupted the cartoons' momentum and pacing. The 1938 Merrie Melodie A Feud There Was, for example, sarcastically uses the obligatory musical number as a shift in the action, with the lead characters singing the number into a KFWB microphone and ceding the mike to an announcer who reads a commercial. By 1940, the animators had been released from this obligation, and the Merrie Melodies shorts came to resemble more closely to the black-and-white Looney Tunes series. In addition, several new characters were created with the initial intention of appearing exclusively in the Merrie Melodies series. The Merrie Melodies short I Haven't Got a Hat introduced the first suite of characters, though all of these were short-lived except for Porky Pig, who was shifted over to Looney Tunes and became that series' breakout star. Additional new characters – Egghead, Elmer Fudd, Inki, and Sniffles – soon followed; the most successful would be Bugs Bunny, who had originated as a white hare in the Looney Tunes short Porky's Hare Hunt as a potential foil for Porky but was instead sent for further development and became a Merrie Melodies star with the debut of the 1940 short A Wild Hare.

In 1942, Schlesinger began producing Looney Tunes in color as well, and the two series became virtually indistinguishable except by their theme music and opening titles – in addition, characters once exclusive to one series began regularly appearing in the other as well. In 1944, the studio went to an all-color schedule; though for the first year of this, Bugs still appeared mainly in the Merrie Melodies series (not appearing in a Looney Tunes cartoon until the end of August), whereas Porky and Daffy Duck appeared mainly in Looney Tunes that year. It was not until 1945 that the two series appeared completely indistinguishable, and that Bugs appeared in more Looney Tunes than Merrie Melodies.

By 1937, the theme music for Looney Tunes was "The Merry-Go-Round Broke Down" by Cliff Friend and Dave Franklin, and the theme music for Merrie Melodies was an adaptation of "Merrily We Roll Along" by Charles Tobias, Murray Mencher and Eddie Cantor (the original theme was "Get Happy" by Harold Arlen, played at a faster tempo). This continued until 1964, when the WB cartoon logos were modernized, and "The Merry-Go-Round Broke Down" became the theme for the Merrie Melodies as well. When the studio went to full color, even the animators themselves did not make any creative distinction between the two series, as evidenced in an interview quote from director Friz Freleng, "I never knew if a film I was making would be Looney Tunes or Merrie Melodies, and what the hell difference would it make, anyway?". The last Merrie Melodies cartoon was Injun Trouble, released in 1969. The Merrie Melodies theatrical cartoons didn't start up again until 1988 with only two cartoons made, The Night of the Living Duck (1988) and (Blooper) Bunny (1991). The Night of the Living Duck got a theatrical release through the compilation film Daffy Duck's Quackbusters (1988), while (Blooper) Bunny was shelved from its intended 1991 release until it premiered on Cartoon Network on June 13, 1997.

== Blue Ribbon reissues ==
Beginning in late 1943, WB, in a cost-conserving effort, began to reissue its backlog of color cartoons under a new program that they called Merrie Melodies "Blue Ribbon" classics. For the reissue, the original front-and-end title sequences were altered. The revised main title card began with the zooming WB logo, followed by the title logo set against a background featuring a "blue ribbon" (hence the re-release program's title) and a Grand Shorts Award trophy, followed by the name of the cartoon. This revised title sequence eliminated the opening technical credits. The ending title card was also revised, replacing the original versions. Also, sometimes the title of the short was slightly altered for the rerelease; the "Blue Ribbon" version of the Bugs Bunny short A Wild Hare was retitled The Wild Hare for reissue, for example. Many of these "Blue Ribbon" prints were the versions used for television broadcasts for many years until Warner Bros. began a restoration program in the early 2000s as part of the Looney Tunes Golden Collection DVD releases.

== Awards and honors ==
TVLine lists the theme song from the series among the best animated series themes of all time.

=== Inducted into the National Film Registry ===
- What's Opera, Doc? (1957), inducted in the 1992 list. "In this animation classic, Elmer Fudd's pursuit of Bugs Bunny is set to opera music and plays out on a Wagnerian scale. The film features such now-classic lines as "Kill the wabbit!" and is one of only three cartoons in which Elmer Fudd bests his rival Bugs. Directed by renowned animator Chuck Jones and his team at Warner Bros., this seven-minute short film is often considered to be Jones' cinematic masterpiece. It also holds the distinction of being the first cartoon selected for inclusion on the National Film Registry."
- Duck Amuck (1953), inducted in the 1999 list. The description reads: "One of the defining examples of Chuck Jones' irreverent creativity, "Duck Amuck" (a Warner Bros. "Merrie Melodies" animation) stars Daffy Duck, as brought to life by master voice artist Mel Blanc. Jones' gives the audience a convincingly fleshed-out character with true personality, regardless of plot or setting. Daffy begins the film as a Musketeer before his animators get the best of him by forgetting to draw in his backgrounds or supply him his voice. Extraordinarily self-reflexive, "Duck Amuck" does more than pierce film's fourth wall, it demolishes it, full send Daffy on a series of surreal misadventures."
- One Froggy Evening (1955), inducted in the 2003 list. The description reads: "A cartoon on every short list of the greatest animation, this classic Chuck Jones creation features crooning amphibian Michigan J. Frog, who drives his owner insane by singing only in private, but never in public."

=== Academy Awards for Best Short Subject (Cartoon) ===
- Tweetie Pie (1947)
- Speedy Gonzales (1955)
- Birds Anonymous (1957)

=== Academy Award nominations ===
- It's Got Me Again! (1932)
- Detouring America (1939)
- A Wild Hare (1940)
- Hiawatha's Rabbit Hunt (1941)
- Rhapsody in Rivets (1941)
- Pigs in a Polka (1943)
- Greetings Bait (1943)
- Life with Feathers (1945)
- Walky Talky Hawky (1946)
- Canary Row (1950)
- Beep Prepared (1961)
- Nelly's Folly (1961)

== See also ==
- Looney Tunes
- Warner Bros. Cartoons
- Looney Tunes and Merrie Melodies filmography
  - Looney Tunes and Merrie Melodies filmography (1929–1939)
  - Looney Tunes and Merrie Melodies filmography (1940–1949)
  - Looney Tunes and Merrie Melodies filmography (1950–1959)
  - Looney Tunes and Merrie Melodies filmography (1960–1969)
  - Looney Tunes and Merrie Melodies filmography (1970–present)
- List of Warner Bros. cartoons with Blue Ribbon reissues
- Silly Symphony(ies), from Walt Disney Productions

== Bibliography ==
- Beck, Jerry and Friedwald, Will (1989): Looney Tunes and Merrie Melodies: A Complete Illustrated Guide to the Warner Bros. Cartoons. Henry Holt and Company.
- Goldmark, Daniel (2005). Tunes for ’Toons : Music and the Hollywood Cartoon. Berkeley: University of California Press. ISBN 0-520-23617-3
- Larsen, Darl (2024). Moving Pictures: A History of American Animation from Gertie to Pixar and Beyond. Rowman & Littlefield.
- Schneider, Steve (1990). That's All Folks!: The Art of Warner Bros. Animation. Henry Holt & Co.
