= Mark Anthony =

Mark or Marc Anthony or Antony may refer to:

== People ==
=== Romans ===
- Marcus Antonius (orator) (died 87 BC), celebrated orator, who was consul in 99 BC, and grandfather of the triumvir
- Marcus Antonius Creticus (died c. 70 BC), father of the triumvir; as praetor in 74 BC he was defeated by the Cretans, earning the surname Creticus
- Mark Antony (83–30 BC), one of Caesar's generals, famous for his eulogy of Julius Caesar and his romance with Cleopatra, formed the "second triumvirate" with Octavian and Lepidus
- Marcus Antonius Antyllus (47–30 BC), son of the triumvir, who nicknamed him Antyllus; he was put to death by Octavian after the battle of Actium

=== Modern people ===
- Mark Anthony (Royal Navy officer) (1786–1867), sailor present at Battle of Trafalgar
- Mark Anthony, a member of the 1980s rock band Chameleon
- Marc Anthony Donais (born 1966), better known as Ryan Idol, a gay pornographic and general theater actor
- Mark Anthony (writer) (born 1966), American author
- Marc Anthony (born 1968), American singer-songwriter
  - Marc Anthony (album)
- Mark Anthony Morales (1968–2021), American rapper using the stage name Prince Markie Dee
- Mark Anthony (DJ), Canadian DJ and music producer
- Marc Anthony (footballer) (born 1978), Scottish association football player
- Mark Anthony (judoka) (born 1989), Australian judoka

== Characters ==
- Mark Antony (Rome character), a fictional version of the historical Marcus Antonius
- Marc Antony and Pussyfoot, animated cartoon characters

== Other ==
- Mark Antony (2000 film), a Malayalam-language film
- Mark Antony (2023 film), a Tamil-language film

== See also ==
- Marc Antoine (disambiguation)
- Marcus Antonius (disambiguation)
- Marco Antônio (disambiguation)
- Henry Mark Anthony (1817–1886), Victorian landscape painter
- Mark-Anthony Middleton, American politician
