= Marcus Antonius (disambiguation) =

Several ancient Roman males with the family name Antonius had Marcus as their first name (praenomen). The most famous of these is Mark Antony (ca. 83–30 BC), the close associate of Julius Caesar and lover of Cleopatra.

Others who might be referred to as Marcus Antonius (or a similar name) include:

== People in ancient Rome and Italy ==
- Marcus Antonius (orator) (143–87 BC), Roman consul in 99 BC, known as "the Orator"
- Marcus Antonius Creticus (died 72–71 BC), Praetor in 74 BC, father of the famous Mark Antony
- Marcus Antonius Antyllus (47–30 BC), eldest son of Mark Antony
- Marcus Antonius Gnipho (fl. 1st century BC), grammarian and teacher of rhetoric of Gaulish origin
- Marcus Antonius Felix, Roman procurator of Iudaea Province 52–58
- Marcus Antonius Primus, Roman general under Nero's reign until at least Domitian's
- Gordian I, born Marcus Antonius Gordianus Sempronianus, later called Marcus Antonius Gordianus Sempronianus Romanus Africanus (159–238), Roman emperor for one month in 238 with his son Gordian II
- Gordian II, born Marcus Antonius Gordianus Sempronianus, later called Caesar Marcus Antonius Gordianus Sempronianus Romanus Africanus (192–238), Roman emperor for one month in 238 with his father Gordian I
- Gordian III, born Marcus Antonius Gordianus Pius, later called Caesar Marcus Antonius Gordianus Pius Augustus (225–244), Roman emperor from 238 to 244, grandson of Gordian I and nephew of Gordian II
- Marcus Antonius Coccius Sabellicus (1436–1506), scholar and historian from Venice, Italy
- Marcus Antonius Antimachus (c. 1473–1552), Greek teacher and translator born in Mantua, Italy

== People from other countries ==
- Marco Antonio de Dominis (1560–1624), Dalmatian ecclesiastic, Catholic archbishop, adjudged heretic of the Catholic Faith
- Markos Antonios Katsaitis (1717–1787), Greek scholar, geographer and lawyer

== See also ==
- Marcus Antoninus (disambiguation)
- Marco Antônio (disambiguation)
- Mark Anthony (disambiguation)
- Marc Antoine (disambiguation)
