= Looney Tunes and Merrie Melodies filmography (1950–1959) =

A total of 278 theatrical animated shorts were released by Warner Bros. Pictures under the Looney Tunes (LT) and Merrie Melodies (MM) banners between the years of 1950 and 1959.

== Series overview ==
Year	Shorts	Originally released	
Year	Shorts	First released	Last released
1950	31	January 14, 1950	December 30, 1950
1951	29	January 6, 1951	December 22, 1951
1952	30	January 5, 1952	December 20, 1952
1953	31	January 3, 1953	December 19, 1953
1954	29	January 2, 1954	December 19, 1954
1955	31	January 1, 1955	December 31, 1955
1956	29	January 14, 1956	December 15, 1956
1957	25	January 5, 1957	December 14, 1957
1958	20	January 4, 1958	December 20, 1958
1959	23	January 10, 1959	December 19, 1959

== 1950 ==
No. overall	No. in year	Title	Series	Directed by	Story by	Animated by	Recurring characters	Original release date	Official DVD/Blu-Ray Availability
578	1	Home, Tweet Home	MM	Friz Freleng	Warren Foster	Virgil Ross, Arthur Davis, Gerry Chiniquy & Ken Champin	Tweety; Sylvester; Hector the Bulldog	January 14, 1950	Blu-Ray/DVD: Platinum Collection: Vol. 2
Sylvester chases Tweety in a city park.
579	2	Hurdy-Gurdy Hare	MM	Robert McKimson	Warren Foster	Bill Melendez, Emery Hawkins, Charles McKimson, John Carey & Phil DeLara	Bugs Bunny; Gruesome Gorilla	January 21, 1950	DVD: Golden Collection: Vol. 4
Bugs Bunny works as a street musician with a trained monkey. He fires the monkey for stealing from him, then the monkey convinces a gorilla to confront Bugs for his behavior.
580	3	Boobs in the Woods	LT	Robert McKimson	Warren Foster	Phil DeLara, Bill Melendez, Emery Hawkins, Charles McKimson & Pete Burness	Daffy Duck; Porky Pig	January 28, 1950	DVD: Golden Collection: Vol. 1 DVD: Super Stars' Porky & Friends; Blu-Ray: Collector's Vault: Vol. 3
Similar to My Favorite Duck, but with a different set of pranks on Porky Pig.
581	4	Mutiny on the Bunny	LT	Friz Freleng	Tedd Pierce	Gerry Chiniquy, Ken Champin, Virgil Ross & Arthur Davis	Bugs Bunny; Yosemite Sam	February 11, 1950	DVD: Super Stars' Bugs Bunny; Blu-Ray: Collector's Vault: Vol. 3
Bugs Bunny is tricked by Yosemite Sam into joining his crew under false pretenses. When he wises up, Bugs gives Sam much-needed payback.
582	5	The Lion's Busy	LT	Friz Freleng	Tedd Pierce	Arthur Davis, Gerry Chiniquy, Ken Champin & Virgil Ross	Beaky Buzzard; Leo the Lion; Bugs Bunny (cameo)	February 18, 1950	Blu-Ray/DVD: Platinum Collection: Vol. 2
A lion named Leo has just celebrated his tenth birthday. One of his presents is a book where he learns that the normal life expectancy of a lion is ten years...and Beaky Buzzard is waiting to eat him.
583	6	The Scarlet Pumpernickel	LT	Chuck Jones	Michael Maltese	Phil Monroe, Ben Washam, Lloyd Vaughan & Ken Harris	Daffy Duck; Elmer Fudd; Henery Hawk; Mama Bear; Melissa Duck; Porky Pig; Sylvester	March 4, 1950	DVD: Golden Collection: Vol. 1 DVD: The Essential Daffy Duck; Blu-Ray/DVD: Platinum Collection: Vol. 1
Daffy Duck, tired of comedic roles, pitches a dramatic script titled "The Scarlet Pumpernickel" (a parody of The Scarlet Pimpernel) to studio head J.L.
584	7	Homeless Hare	MM	Chuck Jones	Michael Maltese	Ken Harris, Phil Monroe, Ben Washam & Lloyd Vaughan	Bugs Bunny	March 11, 1950	DVD: Golden Collection: Vol. 3
When a construction worker destroys Bugs Bunny's home, Bugs fights back.
585	8	Strife with Father	MM	Robert McKimson	Warren Foster	Emery Hawkins, Charles McKimson, Phil DeLara, Rod Scribner & Bill Melendez	Beaky Buzzard	April 1, 1950	Blu-Ray/DVD: Platinum Collection: Vol. 2
Beaky Buzzard's proper English father Monte, a sparrow, attempts to teach his son how to hunt.
586	9	The Hypo-Chondri-Cat	MM	Chuck Jones	Michael Maltese	Ben Washam, Lloyd Vaughan, Ken Harris & Phil Monroe	Claude Cat; Hubie and Bertie	April 15, 1950	DVD: Golden Collection: Vol. 1 Blu-Ray/DVD: Mouse Chronicles
Hubie and Bertie gaslight Claude Cat into thinking he's very sick.
587	10	Big House Bunny	LT	Friz Freleng	Tedd Pierce	Virgil Ross, Arthur Davis, Gerry Chiniquy & Ken Champin	Bugs Bunny; Yosemite Sam	April 22, 1950	DVD: Golden Collection: Vol. 1
Bugs Bunny accidentally burrows into a prison and has to contend with Big-House Sam.
588	11	The Leghorn Blows at Midnight	LT	Robert McKimson	Warren Foster	Charles McKimson, Phil DeLara, Rod Scribner, Bill Melendez & Emery Hawkins	Foghorn Leghorn; Henery Hawk; Barnyard Dawg	May 6, 1950	Blu-Ray: Collector's Choice: Vol. 2
Henery Hawk wants to eat a chicken, but Foghorn Leghorn and Barnyard Dawg keep telling him conflicting information.
589	12	His Bitter Half	MM	Friz Freleng	Tedd Pierce	Ken Champin, Virgil Ross, Arthur Davis & Gerry Chiniquy	Daffy Duck	May 20, 1950	Blu-Ray: Collector's Choice: Vol. 1
Daffy Duck marries a widowed mother for her money, but finds out she's not as nice as first impressions made her out to be, with a bratty, selfish son to boot.
590	13	An Egg Scramble	MM	Robert McKimson	Warren Foster	Phil DeLara, Rod Scribner, Bill Melendez, Emery Hawkins & Charles McKimson	Porky Pig; Miss Prissy	May 27, 1950	DVD: Golden Collection: Vol. 3
Miss Prissy (in her debut cartoon), thinking she laid an egg (another hen placed it under her), goes on a journey to find it when Porky Pig takes it and places it on an egg delivery truck.
591	14	What's Up, Doc?	LT	Robert McKimson	Warren Foster	Bill Melendez, Charles McKimson, Phil DeLara & Pete Burness	Bugs Bunny; Elmer Fudd	June 17, 1950	DVD: Golden Collection: Vol. 1 Blu-Ray: Bugs Bunny 80th Anniversary Collection
Bugs Bunny recounts how he became a movie star via Elmer Fudd of all people.
592	15	All a Bir-r-r-d	LT	Friz Freleng	Tedd Pierce	Ken Champin, Virgil Ross, Arthur Davis, Emery Hawkins & Gerry Chiniquy	Tweety; Sylvester; Hector the Bulldog	June 24, 1950	DVD: Golden Collection: Vol. 2 DVD: Super Stars' Tweety & Sylvester
Sylvester tries to catch Tweety on a train.
593	16	8 Ball Bunny	LT	Chuck Jones	Michael Maltese	Phil Monroe, Ben Washam, Lloyd Vaughan, Ken Harris & Emery Hawkins	Bugs Bunny; Playboy Penguin	July 8, 1950	DVD: Golden Collection: Vol. 4 DVD: The Essential Bugs Bunny; Blu-Ray/DVD: Platinum Collection: Vol. 1 Blu-Ray: Bugs Bunny 80th Anniversary Collection
Bugs Bunny goes on a long journey to the South Pole to take Playboy Penguin home.
594	17	It's Hummer Time	LT	Robert McKimson	Warren Foster	Rod Scribner, Bill Melendez, Charles McKimson, Phil DeLara & John Carey; Harry Love (effects)	The Supreme Cat; The Talking Bulldog	July 22, 1950	DVD: Golden Collection: Vol. 6
A cat keeps bothering a dog while catching a hummingbird, facing humiliating punishments each time.
595	18	Golden Yeggs	MM	Friz Freleng	Tedd Pierce	Arthur Davis, Gerry Chiniquy, Ken Champin, Virgil Ross & Emery Hawkins	Daffy Duck; Porky Pig; Rocky	August 5, 1950	DVD: Golden Collection: Vol. 1
Rocky, reading that Daffy Duck (supposedly) laid a literal golden egg, takes him from Porky Pig's farm in an attempt to have him reproduce more golden eggs.
596	19	Hillbilly Hare	MM	Robert McKimson	Tedd Pierce	Rod Scribner, Phil DeLara, John Carey, Emery Hawkins & Charles McKimson	Bugs Bunny	August 12, 1950	DVD: Golden Collection: Vol. 3 Blu-Ray/DVD: Platinum Collection: Vol. 3
Bugs Bunny goes up against hillbilly twins who want to eat him.
597	20	Dog Gone South	MM	Chuck Jones	Michael Maltese	Ben Washam, Lloyd Vaughan, Ken Harris, Phil Monroe & Emery Hawkins	Charlie Dog; Colonel Shuffle	August 20, 1950	DVD: Golden Collection: Vol. 6 Blu-Ray/DVD: Platinum Collection: Vol. 3
Down south, Charlie Dog tries to get Colonel Shuffle to adopt him, even if it means sabotaging his relationship with his current dog to do it.
598	21	The Ducksters	LT	Chuck Jones	Michael Maltese	Lloyd Vaughan, Ken Harris, Phil Monroe & Ben Washam	Daffy Duck; Porky Pig	September 2, 1950	DVD: Golden Collection: Vol. 1
Porky Pig is the unfortunate contestant on a game show run by a sadistic Daffy Duck.
599	22	A Fractured Leghorn	MM	Robert McKimson	Warren Foster	Rod Scribner, Phil DeLara, Bill Melendez & Charles McKimson	Foghorn Leghorn; The Supreme Cat	September 16, 1950	Blu-Ray: Collector's Choice: Vol. 1
A cat just wants to fish for food, but Foghorn Leghorn (in his first solo cartoon) keeps getting in his way.
600	23	Bunker Hill Bunny	MM	Friz Freleng	Tedd Pierce	Gerry Chiniquy, Ken Champin, Virgil Ross & Arthur Davis	Bugs Bunny; Yosemite Sam	September 23, 1950	DVD: Golden Collection: Vol. 1
In the era of the real-life Battle of Bunker Hill, Bugs Bunny (representing America) and Sam von Schmamm (representing England) battle it out.
601	24	Canary Row	MM	Friz Freleng	Tedd Pierce	Virgil Ross, Arthur Davis, Emery Hawkins, Gerry Chiniquy & Ken Champin	Tweety; Sylvester; Granny	October 7, 1950	DVD: Golden Collection: Vol. 1 DVD: Super Stars' Tweety & Sylvester; Blu-Ray/DVD: Platinum Collection: Vol. 3
Sylvester tries to capture Tweety near an apartment window.
602	25	Stooge for a Mouse	MM	Friz Freleng	N/A	Arthur Davis, Emery Hawkins, Gerry Chiniquy, Ken Champin & Virgil Ross	Sylvester; Hector the Bulldog	October 21, 1950	Blu-Ray: Collector's Choice: Vol. 1
A mouse cruelly drives a wedge between the friendship of Sylvester the Cat and Mike the Bulldog to get some cheese.
603	26	Pop 'im Pop!	LT	Robert McKimson	Warren Foster	Charles McKimson, Rod Scribner, Phil DeLara, Manuel Perez & Bill Melendez	Hippety Hopper; Sylvester; Sylvester Jr.	October 28, 1950	DVD: Super Stars' Sylvester & Hippety Hopper
Sylvester tells his son Sylvester Jr. wild stories about how he once captured a giant mouse. He'll now have to eat his own words when an actual "giant mouse" comes into their home.
604	27	Bushy Hare	LT	Robert McKimson	Warren Foster	Phil DeLara, Bill Melendez, Charles McKimson, Rod Scribner & John Carey	Bugs Bunny; Hippety Hopper	November 18, 1950	DVD: Super Stars' Bugs Bunny
Bugs Bunny finds himself confronting a very violent aborigine when he's accidentally taken to Australia.
605	28	Caveman Inki	LT	Chuck Jones	Michael Maltese	Lloyd Vaughan, Ken Harris, Phil Monroe & Ben Washam	Inki; Minah Bird	November 25, 1950	N/A
Inki and his pet dinosaur go hunting for food.
606	29	Dog Collared	MM	Robert McKimson	Warren Foster	Charles McKimson, Rod Scribner, Phil DeLara, Manuel Perez & Bill Melendez	Porky Pig	December 2, 1950	DVD: Super Stars' Porky & Friends
A friendly but pesky dog keeps bothering Porky Pig.
607	30	Rabbit of Seville	LT	Chuck Jones	Michael Maltese	Phil Monroe, Ben Washam, Lloyd Vaughan, Ken Harris & Emery Hawkins	Bugs Bunny; Elmer Fudd	December 16, 1950	DVD: Golden Collection: Vol. 1 DVD: The Essential Bugs Bunny; Blu-Ray/DVD: Platinum Collection: Vol. 1 Blu-Ray: Bugs Bunny 80th Anniversary Collection
In a parody of The Barber of Seville, Bugs Bunny and Elmer Fudd act out a play where Bugs plays a barber to Elmer.
608	31	Two's a Crowd	LT	Chuck Jones	Michael Maltese	Ken Harris, Phil Monroe, Ben Washam, Lloyd Vaughan & Emery Hawkins	Claude Cat; Frisky Puppy	December 30, 1950	Blu-Ray: Collector's Vault: Vol. 1
Claude Cat does not take kindly to his owners adopting a new puppy, and tries increasingly sadistic measures to get him out of his life.

== 1951 ==
No. overall	No. in year	Title	Series	Directed by	Story by	Animated by	Recurring characters	Original release date	Official DVD/Blu-Ray Availability
609	1	Hare We Go	MM	Robert McKimson	Warren Foster	Phil DeLara, Charles McKimson, John Carey, Rod Scribner & Bill Melendez	Bugs Bunny	January 6, 1951	DVD: Super Stars' Bugs Bunny
Bugs Bunny encounters Christopher Columbus in 1492.
610	2	A Fox in a Fix	MM	Robert McKimson	Warren Foster	Rod Scribner, Phil DeLara, Charles McKimson, John Carey & Bill Melendez	The Talking Bulldog	January 20, 1951	Blu-Ray: Collector's Vault: Vol. 1
A fox disguises himself as a terrier to trick a bulldog so as to gain access to chickens to eat.
611	3	Canned Feud	LT	Friz Freleng	Warren Foster & Cal Howard	Ken Champin, Virgil Ross, Arthur Davis, Manuel Perez & John Carey	Sylvester	February 3, 1951	DVD: Golden Collection: Vol. 1 Blu-Ray/DVD: Platinum Collection: Vol. 2
Sylvester is accidentally left home alone for a week, and the only access to food is guarded by an evil mouse.
612	4	Rabbit Every Monday	LT	Friz Freleng	Friz Freleng (uncredited)	Manuel Perez, Ken Champin, Virgil Ross & Arthur Davis	Bugs Bunny; Yosemite Sam	February 10, 1951	Blu-Ray: Bugs Bunny 80th Anniversary Collection
Yosemite Sam tries to hunt Bugs Bunny to eat him.
613	5	Putty Tat Trouble	LT	Friz Freleng	Warren Foster	Arthur Davis, Manuel Perez, Ken Champin & Virgil Ross	Tweety; Sylvester; Sam Cat	February 24, 1951	DVD: Golden Collection: Vol. 1 DVD: Super Stars' Tweety & Sylvester
Sylvester and Sam Cat (the latter's debut) both try to eat Tweety in the winter.
614	6	Corn Plastered	MM	Robert McKimson	Warren Foster	Charles McKimson, Rod Scribner, Phil DeLara, Bill Melendez & John Carey	N/A (one-shot cartoon)	March 3, 1951	DVD: Super Stars' Porky & Friends
A crow keeps eating the corn grown by an old farmer, who tries to get rid of him in return.
615	7	Bunny Hugged	MM	Chuck Jones	Michael Maltese	Ken Harris, Phil Monroe, Ben Washam & Lloyd Vaughan	Bugs Bunny; The Crusher	March 10, 1951	DVD: Golden Collection: Vol. 2 Blu-Ray/DVD: Platinum Collection: Vol. 3
Bugs Bunny must use strategy against The Crusher's brute strength in a wrestling match.
616	8	Scent-imental Romeo	MM	Chuck Jones	Michael Maltese	Ben Washam, Lloyd Vaughan, Phil Monroe & Ken Harris	Pepé Le Pew; Penelope Pussycat	March 24, 1951	DVD: Super Stars' Pepé Le Pew; Blu-Ray/DVD: Platinum Collection: Vol. 2
Penelope Pussycat disguises herself as a skunk at a zoo in Paris. Unfortunately, it attracts the attention of the actual skunk Pepé Le Pew.
617	9	A Bone for a Bone	LT	Friz Freleng	Ben Hardaway	Virgil Ross, Arthur Davis, Manuel Perez & Ken Champin; Harry Love (effects)	Goofy Gophers	April 7, 1951	Blu-Ray: Collector's Choice: Vol. 4
When a dog rudely buried his home in the Goofy Gophers' home, they implore him to bury it somewhere else. When he refuses, they go on the initiative.
618	10	The Fair-Haired Hare	LT	Friz Freleng	Warren Foster	Ken Champin, Virgil Ross, Arthur Davis, Manuel Perez & John Carey	Bugs Bunny; Yosemite Sam	April 14, 1951	Blu-Ray: Bugs Bunny 80th Anniversary Collection
Bugs Bunny and Yosemite Sam are forced to share a house together by law. When Sam learns that in the event of them dies, the other gets full ownership, he tries to kill Bugs.
619	11	A Hound for Trouble	MM	Chuck Jones	Michael Maltese	Lloyd Vaughan, Ken Harris, Phil Monroe, Ben Washam & John Carey	Charlie Dog	April 28, 1951	Blu-Ray: Collector's Choice: Vol. 2
Charlie Dog takes over a restaurant in Pisa when the owner's on break.
620	12	Early to Bet	MM	Robert McKimson	Warren Foster	Phil DeLara, Emery Hawkins, Charles McKimson & Rod Scribner	The Supreme Cat; The Talking Bulldog	May 12, 1951	DVD: Golden Collection: Vol. 1
A cat is bitten by a literal gambling bug to compulsively bet against a bulldog, but he keeps on losing.
621	13	Rabbit Fire	LT	Chuck Jones	Michael Maltese	Lloyd Vaughan, Ken Harris, Phil Monroe & Ben Washam	Bugs Bunny; Daffy Duck; Elmer Fudd	May 19, 1951	DVD: Golden Collection: Vol. 1 DVD: The Essential Bugs Bunny; Blu-Ray/DVD: Platinum Collection: Vol. 2 Blu-Ray: Bugs Bunny 80th Anniversary Collection
Bugs Bunny and Daffy Duck (in their first cartoon together) try to persuade Elmer Fudd to hunt the other.
622	14	Room and Bird	MM	Friz Freleng	Warren Foster & Tedd Pierce	Virgil Ross, Arthur Davis, Manuel Perez & Ken Champin	Tweety; Sylvester; Granny; Hector the Bulldog	June 2, 1951	DVD: Golden Collection: Vol. 2 DVD: Super Stars' Tweety & Sylvester
Sylvester tries to eat Tweety in a hotel that doesn't allow pets. While Sylvester attempts to eat Tweety, he also has to be wary of the detective and Hector.
623	15	Chow Hound	LT	Chuck Jones	Michael Maltese	Phil Monroe, Ben Washam, Lloyd Vaughan & Ken Harris	N/A (one-shot cartoon)	June 16, 1951	DVD: Golden Collection: Vol. 6 Blu-Ray/DVD: Platinum Collection: Vol. 1
A selfish, greedy bulldog forces a cat and mouse to catch him food.
624	16	French Rarebit	MM	Robert McKimson	Tedd Pierce	Rod Scribner, Phil DeLara, Charles McKimson & Emery Hawkins	Bugs Bunny	June 30, 1951	DVD: Golden Collection: Vol. 2
Two French chefs compete to use Bugs Bunny for their gourmet delicacy.
625	17	The Wearing of the Grin	LT	Chuck Jones	Michael Maltese	Ben Washam, Lloyd Vaughan, Ken Harris & Phil Monroe	Porky Pig	July 14, 1951	DVD: Golden Collection: Vol. 1
Porky Pig stays the night at a castle, but things go weird very fast.
626	18	Leghorn Swoggled	MM	Robert McKimson	Warren Foster	Charles McKimson, Rod Scribner, Phil DeLara & Emery Hawkins	Foghorn Leghorn; Henery Hawk; Barnyard Dawg; The Supreme Cat	July 28, 1951	Blu-Ray: Collector's Choice: Vol. 4
Henery Hawk goes on a fetch quest to capture Foghorn Leghorn.
627	19	His Hare-Raising Tale	LT	Friz Freleng	Warren Foster	Virgil Ross (Note: Manuel Perez, Ken Champin and Arthur Davis were credited on the title card, but despite that, Ross was responsible for all of the new animation, the rest of the cartoon being taken from clips of previous cartoons.)	Bugs Bunny; Clyde Bunny	August 11, 1951	Blu-Ray: Bugs Bunny 80th Anniversary Collection
Bugs Bunny tells his nephew Clyde stories about his life in a clip show cartoon.
628	20	Cheese Chasers	MM	Chuck Jones	Michael Maltese	Ben Washam, Lloyd Vaughan, Phil Monroe & Ken Harris	Claude Cat; Hubie and Bertie	August 25, 1951	DVD: Golden Collection: Vol. 2 Blu-Ray/DVD: Mouse Chronicles
Hubie and Bertie beg Claude Cat to eat them after they stuffed themselves with cheese the night before. When Claude Cat refuses, they give chase.
629	21	Lovelorn Leghorn	LT	Robert McKimson	Tedd Pierce	Phil DeLara, Charles McKimson, Rod Scribner & Emery Hawkins	Foghorn Leghorn; Miss Prissy; Barnyard Dawg	September 8, 1951	Blu-Ray/DVD: Platinum Collection: Vol. 1
In their first pairing together, Miss Prissy tries to find a husband and happens on Foghorn Leghorn.
630	22	Tweety's S.O.S.	MM	Friz Freleng	Warren Foster	Arthur Davis, Manuel Perez, Ken Champin & Virgil Ross	Tweety; Sylvester; Granny	September 22, 1951	DVD: Golden Collection: Vol. 1 DVD: Super Stars' Tweety & Sylvester
Sylvester tries to capture Tweety on a cruise ship, but Tweety's owner Granny and his own seasickness serve as obstacles.
631	23	Ballot Box Bunny	MM	Friz Freleng	Warren Foster	Ken Champin, Virgil Ross, Arthur Davis & Manuel Perez	Bugs Bunny; Yosemite Sam	October 6, 1951	DVD: Golden Collection: Vol. 1 Blu-Ray: Collector's Vault: Vol. 3
Bugs Bunny and Yosemite Sam run against each other for mayor in a small town.
632	24	A Bear for Punishment	LT	Chuck Jones	Michael Maltese	Ken Harris, Phil Monroe, Lloyd Vaughan & Ben Washam	The Three Bears	October 20, 1951	DVD: Golden Collection: Vol. 2 Blu-Ray/DVD: Platinum Collection: Vol. 3
Henry Bear has to endure Father's Day from his own family.
633	25	Sleepy Time Possum	MM	Robert McKimson	Tedd Pierce	Charles McKimson, Rod Scribner, Phil DeLara, Emery Hawkins & John Carey	N/A (one-shot cartoon)	November 3, 1951	DVD: Golden Collection: Vol. 6 (extra, unrestored); Blu-Ray: Collector's Vault: Vol. 3 (restored)
A father possum disguises himself as a dog to try to scare his sleep-a-holic son into peeling potatoes.
634	26	Drip-Along Daffy	MM	Chuck Jones	Michael Maltese	Phil Monroe, Lloyd Vaughan, Ben Washam & Ken Harris	Daffy Duck; Porky Pig; Nasty Canasta	November 17, 1951	DVD: Golden Collection: Vol. 1 Blu-Ray/DVD: Platinum Collection: Vol. 2
Drip-Along Daffy comes into town with his sidekick Porky Pig to take out Nasty Canasta, a task easier said than done.
635	27	Big Top Bunny	MM	Robert McKimson	Tedd Pierce	Charles McKimson, Rod Scribner, Phil DeLara & Bob Wickersham	Bugs Bunny	December 1, 1951	DVD: Golden Collection: Vol. 1
A Russian bear at a circus, furious he has to share the spotlight with Bugs Bunny, tries to get rid of him.
636	28	Tweet Tweet Tweety	LT	Friz Freleng	Warren Foster	Manuel Perez, Ken Champin, Virgil Ross & Arthur Davis; Harry Love (effects)	Tweety; Sylvester	December 15, 1951	DVD: Golden Collection: Vol. 2 DVD: Super Stars' Tweety & Sylvester
Sylvester tries to eat a newly hatched Tweety in Yellowstone National Park.
637	29	The Prize Pest	LT	Robert McKimson	Tedd Pierce	Rod Scribner, Phil DeLara, Emery Hawkins & Charles McKimson	Daffy Duck; Porky Pig	December 22, 1951	DVD: Super Stars' Daffy Duck
Porky Pig wins Daffy Duck in a radio show, but he wears out his welcome very quickly.

== 1952 ==
No. overall	No. in year	Title	Series	Directed by	Story by	Animated by	Recurring characters	Original release date	Official DVD/Blu-Ray Availability
638	1	Who's Kitten Who?	LT	Robert McKimson	Tedd Pierce	Phil DeLara, Emery Hawkins, Charles McKimson & Rod Scribner	Hippety Hopper; Sylvester; Sylvester Jr.	January 5, 1952	DVD: Super Stars' Sylvester & Hippety Hopper
Sylvester tries to teach his son Sylvester Jr. how to catch mice, when Hippety Hopper comes into their house after escaping from the zoo. But Hippety keeps disappearing before Jr. can see him, thinking his father is lying.
639	2	Operation: Rabbit	LT	Chuck Jones	Michael Maltese	Lloyd Vaughan, Ben Washam, Ken Harris & Phil Monroe	Bugs Bunny; Wile E. Coyote	January 19, 1952	DVD: Golden Collection: Vol. 4 Blu-Ray/DVD: Platinum Collection: Vol. 3
Wile E. Coyote (in his first speaking role) asks Bugs Bunny to be his supper. When Bugs refuses, Wile E. goes for his gadgets.
640	3	Feed the Kitty	MM	Chuck Jones	Michael Maltese	Ken Harris, Phil Monroe, Lloyd Vaughan & Ben Washam	Marc Antony and Pussyfoot	February 2, 1952	DVD: Golden Collection: Vol. 1 Blu-Ray/DVD: Platinum Collection: Vol. 1
A big dog named Marc Antony tries to hide his new little kitten friend from his owner.
641	4	Gift Wrapped	LT	Friz Freleng	Warren Foster	Arthur Davis, Manuel Perez, Ken Champin & Virgil Ross	Tweety; Sylvester; Granny; Hector the Bulldog	February 16, 1952	DVD: Golden Collection: Vol. 2 DVD: Super Stars' Tweety & Sylvester; Blu-Ray/DVD: Platinum Collection: Vol. 2
Sylvester gets a rubber mouse for Christmas, but he instead wants Granny's gift, Tweety, for himself.
642	5	Foxy by Proxy	MM	Friz Freleng	Warren Foster	Virgil Ross, Arthur Davis, Manuel Perez & Ken Champin	Bugs Bunny; Willoughby	February 23, 1952	DVD: Super Stars' Bugs Bunny; Blu-Ray: Collector's Vault: Vol. 3
A remake of Of Fox and Hounds, but with the fox George swapped out for Bugs Bunny.
643	6	Thumb Fun	LT	Robert McKimson	Tedd Pierce	Rod Scribner, Phil DeLara, Charles McKimson & Bob Wickersham	Daffy Duck; Porky Pig	March 1, 1952	DVD: Super Stars' Porky & Friends
Daffy Duck is an annoying hitchhiker traveling with Porky Pig.
644	7	14 Carrot Rabbit	LT	Friz Freleng	Warren Foster	Manuel Perez, Ken Champin, Virgil Ross & Arthur Davis	Bugs Bunny; Yosemite Sam	March 15, 1952	DVD: Golden Collection: Vol. 5
Yosemite Sam tries to form a partnership with Bugs Bunny, who has the ability to sense gold, but only for selfish intentions.
645	8	Little Beau Pepé	MM	Chuck Jones	Michael Maltese	Lloyd Vaughan, Ben Washam, Ken Harris & Phil Monroe	Pepé Le Pew; Penelope Pussycat	March 29, 1952	DVD: Super Stars' Pepé Le Pew
Pepé Le Pew tries to join the French Foreign Legion, but every human in the fortress is immediately repulsed by his smell and flees. Penelope Pussycat, who's left behind and accidentally gets a white stripe down her back (making her look like a skunk), must deal with Pepé on her own.
646	9	Kiddin' The Kitten	MM	Robert McKimson	Tedd Pierce	Phil DeLara, Charles McKimson & Rod Scribner	Dodsworth	April 5, 1952	DVD: Golden Collection: Vol. 4
A lazy cat's place in his home is on the line when his owner hires a younger kitten to catch mice in his place.
647	10	Water, Water Every Hare	LT	Chuck Jones	Michael Maltese	Ben Washam, Ken Harris, Phil Monroe & Lloyd Vaughan; Harry Love (effects)	Bugs Bunny; Gossamer	April 19, 1952	DVD: Golden Collection: Vol. 1
Bugs Bunny once again finds himself in a castle run by a mad scientist, while also confronting a giant orange-red monster.
648	11	Little Red Rodent Hood	MM	Friz Freleng	Warren Foster	Ken Champin, Virgil Ross, Arthur Davis & Manuel Perez	Sylvester; Hector the Bulldog	May 3, 1952	DVD: Golden Collection: Vol. 5 Blu-Ray/DVD: Platinum Collection: Vol. 2
A re-telling of "Little Red Riding Hood", but with a mouse for the title heroine and Sylvester as a stand-in for The Big Bad Wolf.
649	12	Sock a Doodle Do	LT	Robert McKimson	Tedd Pierce	Charles McKimson, Rod Scribner & Phil DeLara	Foghorn Leghorn; Barnyard Dawg	May 10, 1952	Blu-Ray: Collector's Vault: Vol. 2
Foghorn Leghorn and Barnyard Dawg both try to take advantage of a rooster who has a compulsion to punch every time he hears a bell.
650	13	Beep, Beep	MM	Chuck Jones	Michael Maltese	Ben Washam, Ken Harris, Lloyd Vaughan & Phil Monroe	Wile E. Coyote and the Road Runner	May 24, 1952	DVD: Golden Collection: Vol. 2 Blu-Ray/DVD: Platinum Collection: Vol. 1
Wile E. Coyote attempts to catch the Road Runner again.
651	14	The Hasty Hare	LT	Chuck Jones	Michael Maltese	Ken Harris, Lloyd Vaughan & Ben Washam	Bugs Bunny; Marvin the Martian; K-9	June 7, 1952	Blu-Ray/DVD: Platinum Collection: Vol. 1
Marvin the Martian tries to capture Bugs Bunny to take back to his home planet.
652	15	Ain't She Tweet	LT	Friz Freleng	Warren Foster	Virgil Ross, Arthur Davis, Manuel Perez & Ken Champin	Tweety; Sylvester; Granny; Hector the Bulldog	June 21, 1952	DVD: Golden Collection: Vol. 2 DVD: Super Stars' Tweety & Sylvester; Blu-Ray: Collector's Vault: Vol. 1
Sylvester has to somehow avoid Granny's many many pet dogs in his pursuit of eating Tweety.
653	16	The Turn-Tale Wolf	MM	Robert McKimson	Tedd Pierce	Phil DeLara, Charles McKimson, Herman Cohen & Rod Scribner	N/A (one-shot cartoon)	June 28, 1952	DVD: Golden Collection: Vol. 5
Mr. B.B. Wolf, the wolf from "The Three Little Pigs", tells his nephew (agitated that he is the nephew of the villain of "The Three Little Pigs" story) a story that paints the pigs in a negative light instead of him.
654	17	Cracked Quack	MM	Friz Freleng	Warren Foster	Arthur Davis, Manuel Perez, Ken Champin & Virgil Ross	Daffy Duck; Porky Pig	July 5, 1952	Blu-ray: Collector's Choice: Vol. 1
Daffy Duck tries to stay the winter at Porky Pig's house under the guise of a stuffed duck.
655	18	Oily Hare	MM	Robert McKimson	Tedd Pierce	Rod Scribner, Phil DeLara, Charles McKimson & Herman Cohen	Bugs Bunny	July 26, 1952	DVD: Golden Collection: Vol. 5
Bugs Bunny's home, which happens to be located in the middle of an oil field in Texas, is confronted by Devil Rich Texan, who wants him out.
656	19	Hoppy-Go-Lucky	LT	Robert McKimson	Tedd Pierce	Charles McKimson, Herman Cohen, Rod Scribner & Phil DeLara	Hippety Hopper; Sylvester	August 9, 1952	DVD: Super Stars' Sylvester & Hippety Hopper
Sylvester tries to catch a mouse for a bigger cat named Benny (a direct reference to the character from Of Mice and Men) for him to "hug and pet". Said "mouse" ends up being Hippety Hopper.
657	20	Going! Going! Gosh!	MM	Chuck Jones	Michael Maltese	Lloyd Vaughan, Ben Washam & Ken Harris	Wile E. Coyote and the Road Runner	August 23, 1952	DVD: Golden Collection: Vol. 2 Blu-Ray/DVD: Platinum Collection: Vol. 2
Wile E. Coyote once again tries to catch the Road Runner.
658	21	A Bird in a Guilty Cage	LT	Friz Freleng	Warren Foster	Manuel Perez, Ken Champin, Virgil Ross & Arthur Davis	Tweety; Sylvester	August 30, 1952	DVD: Golden Collection: Vol. 2 Blu-Ray: Collector's Vault: Vol. 2
Sylvester chases Tweety through a department store named Stacy's.
659	22	Mouse-Warming	LT	Chuck Jones	Michael Maltese	Ben Washam, Lloyd Vaughan & Ken Harris	Claude Cat	September 8, 1952	Blu-Ray/DVD: Mouse Chronicles (extra, unrestored); Blu-Ray: Collector's Choice: Vol. 4 (restored)
A boy mouse falls in love with a new female mouse moving in to a new hole, but he has to get past Claude Cat to meet her.
660	23	Rabbit Seasoning	MM	Chuck Jones	Michael Maltese	Ben Washam, Lloyd Vaughan & Ken Harris	Bugs Bunny; Daffy Duck; Elmer Fudd	September 20, 1952	DVD: Golden Collection: Vol. 1 Blu-Ray/DVD: Platinum Collection: Vol. 2
A follow-up to Rabbit Fire, this time taking place in the fall.
661	24	The EGGcited Rooster	MM	Robert McKimson	Tedd Pierce	Rod Scribner, Phil DeLara, Charles McKimson & Herman Cohen	Foghorn Leghorn; Henery Hawk; Barnyard Dawg	October 4, 1952	Blu-Ray: Collector's Vault: Vol. 2
Foghorn Leghorn is forced to keep warm an egg by his wife, but he has to contend with not just Barnyard Dawg but also Henery Hawk, who wants to eat the egg for himself.
662	25	Tree for Two	MM	Friz Freleng	Warren Foster	Ken Champin, Virgil Ross, Arthur Davis & Manuel Perez	Spike and Chester; Sylvester	October 18, 1952	Blu-Ray/DVD: Platinum Collection: Vol. 3
Spike and Chester decide to bully Sylvester...at the same time a black panther has escaped from the local zoo, who constantly hurts Spike.
663	26	The Super Snooper	LT	Robert McKimson	Tedd Pierce	Herman Cohen, Rod Scribner, Phil DeLara & Charles McKimson	Daffy Duck; Shapely Lady Duck	November 1, 1952	DVD: Golden Collection: Vol. 5
Duck Drake is summoned to investigate a reported murder, but a female duck keeps peppering him with kisses as he tries to investigate.
664	27	Rabbit's Kin	MM	Robert McKimson	Tedd Pierce	Charles McKimson, Herman Cohen, Rod Scribner & Phil DeLara	Bugs Bunny; Pete Puma	November 15, 1952	DVD: Golden Collection: Vol. 1 Blu-Ray: Collector's Vault: Vol. 3
Bugs Bunny faces off against a very stupid puma named Pete Puma.
665	28	Terrier-Stricken	MM	Chuck Jones	Michael Maltese	Lloyd Vaughan, Ken Harris & Ben Washam; Harry Love (effects)	Claude Cat; Frisky Puppy	November 29, 1952	Blu-Ray: Collector's Vault: Vol. 1
Frisky Puppy's barking at the worst possible moments get Claude Cat into a heap of troublesome situations.
666	29	Fool Coverage	LT	Robert McKimson	Tedd Pierce	Phil DeLara, Charles McKimson, Herman Cohen & Rod Scribner	Daffy Duck; Porky Pig	December 13, 1952	DVD: Super Stars' Porky & Friends
Daffy Duck plays a persistent insurance salesman who tries to convince Porky Pig to get his health coverage.
667	30	Hare Lift	LT	Friz Freleng	Warren Foster	Manuel Perez, Ken Champin, Virgil Ross & Arthur Davis	Bugs Bunny; Yosemite Sam	December 20, 1952	Blu-Ray: Bugs Bunny 80th Anniversary Collection
Bugs Bunny finds himself somehow on a plane, and is confronted by Yosemite Sam, who had just robbed a bank, to fly it, leading to various plane misadventures.

== 1953 ==
No. overall	No. in year	Title	Series	Directed by	Story by	Animated by	Recurring characters	Original release date	Official DVD/Blu-Ray Availability
668	1	Don't Give Up the Sheep	LT	Chuck Jones	Michael Maltese	Ken Harris, Ben Washam & Lloyd Vaughan	Ralph Wolf and Sam Sheepdog	January 3, 1953	DVD: Golden Collection: Vol. 1
In the first entry in the Ralph Wolf and Sam Sheepdog series, a sheepdog named Ralph works a 9-to-5 job where he stops a (then unnamed) wolf from stealing sheep.
669	2	Snow Business	LT	Friz Freleng	Warren Foster	Virgil Ross, Arthur Davis, Manuel Perez & Ken Champin	Tweety; Sylvester; Granny	January 17, 1953	DVD: Golden Collection: Vol. 2 DVD: Super Stars' Tweety & Sylvester; Blu-Ray: Collector's Vault: Vol. 1
Tweety and Sylvester are snowbound in Granny's mountain cabin. While Sylvester tries to eat Tweety, a starving mouse tries to eat him.
670	3	A Mouse Divided	MM	Friz Freleng	Warren Foster	Arthur Davis, Manuel Perez, Ken Champin & Virgil Ross	Sylvester; The Drunk Stork	January 31, 1953	Blu-Ray: Collector's Choice: Vol. 1
The Drunk Stork delivers a baby mouse to Sylvester and his wife. Sylvester becomes a father to the mouse and tries to stop other cats from eating him.
671	4	Forward March Hare	LT	Chuck Jones	Michael Maltese	Ben Washam, Lloyd Vaughan & Ken Harris	Bugs Bunny	February 14, 1953	DVD: Golden Collection: Vol. 4
Bugs Bunny finds himself accidentally drafted into the army.
672	5	Kiss Me Cat	LT	Chuck Jones	Michael Maltese	Lloyd Vaughan, Ken Harris & Ben Washam	Marc Antony and Pussyfoot	February 21, 1953	DVD: Golden Collection: Vol. 4 Blu-Ray/DVD: Platinum Collection: Vol. 1
Marc Antony tries to teach Pussyfoot how to catch mice in order to keep his stay in his owners' house.
673	6	Duck Amuck	MM	Chuck Jones	Michael Maltese	Ken Harris, Ben Washam & Lloyd Vaughan	Daffy Duck; Bugs Bunny (cameo)	February 28, 1953	DVD: Golden Collection: Vol. 1 DVD: The Essential Daffy Duck; Blu-Ray/DVD: Platinum Collection: Vol. 1
Daffy Duck tries to get a cartoon made, but the animator keeps thwarting him at every step. Note: Added to the National Film Registry in 1999.
674	7	Upswept Hare	MM	Robert McKimson	Tedd Pierce	Charles McKimson, Herman Cohen, Rod Scribner & Phil DeLara	Bugs Bunny; Elmer Fudd	March 14, 1953	Blu-Ray: Bugs Bunny 80th Anniversary Collection
Elmer Fudd digs up a rare desert flower and takes it home...unaware he also took Bugs Bunny's home with him.
675	8	A Peck o' Trouble	LT	Robert McKimson	Tedd Pierce	Herman Cohen, Rod Scribner, Phil DeLara & Charles McKimson	Dodsworth	March 28, 1953	DVD: Golden Collection: Vol. 4
Dodsworth tries to teach a kitten how to catch a woodpecker for his breakfast.
676	9	Fowl Weather	MM	Friz Freleng	Warren Foster	Ken Champin, Virgil Ross, Arthur Davis & Manuel Perez	Tweety; Sylvester; Granny; Hector the Bulldog	April 4, 1953	Blu-Ray: Collector's Vault: Vol. 2
Granny threatens Hector the Bulldog to look after Tweety, at the same time Sylvester tries to make his move to eat Tweety.
677	10	Muscle Tussle	MM	Robert McKimson	Tedd Pierce	Rod Scribner, Phil DeLara, Charles McKimson & Herman Cohen	Daffy Duck	April 18, 1953	Blu-Ray: Collector's Choice: Vol. 4
Daffy Duck has to compete against a bully on the beach hitting on his girlfriend.
678	11	Southern Fried Rabbit	LT	Friz Freleng	Warren Foster	Arthur Davis, Manuel Perez, Ken Champin & Virgil Ross	Bugs Bunny; Yosemite Sam	May 2, 1953	DVD: Golden Collection: Vol. 4
Bugs Bunny leaves his desolate home to cross the Mason–Dixon line when he reads that down in Alabama a farmer grew a lot of carrots. Unfortunately for him, Yosemite Sam, who still think it is the Civil War (despite it ending over 90 years ago as of the cartoon's 1952 production), refuses to let "any Yankees" cross.
679	12	Ant Pasted	LT	Friz Freleng	Warren Foster	Virgil Ross, Arthur Davis, Manuel Perez & Ken Champin; Harry Love (effects)	Elmer Fudd	May 9, 1953	DVD: Super Stars' Porky & Friends
Elmer Fudd fights off against ants at his Fourth of July picnic.
680	13	Much Ado About Nutting	MM	Chuck Jones	Michael Maltese	Lloyd Vaughan, Ken Harris & Ben Washam	N/A (one-shot cartoon)	May 23, 1953	DVD: Golden Collection: Vol. 6 Blu-Ray: Collector's Vault: Vol. 1
A squirrel tries to crack open a coconut, but it is much harder than he expects it to be.
681	14	There Auto Be a Law	LT	Robert McKimson	Tedd Pierce	Phil DeLara, Charles McKimson, Herman Cohen & Rod Scribner	N/A (one-shot cartoon)	June 6, 1953	Blu-Ray: Collector's Choice: Vol. 3
A "spot gag" cartoon about automobiles.
682	15	Hare Trimmed	MM	Friz Freleng	Warren Foster	Manuel Perez, Ken Champin, Virgil Ross & Arthur Davis	Bugs Bunny; Yosemite Sam; Granny	June 20, 1953	DVD: Super Stars' Bugs Bunny; Blu-Ray: Collector's Vault: Vol. 1
Bugs Bunny tries to stop Yosemite Sam from marrying Granny for her money.
683	16	Tom Tom Tomcat	MM	Friz Freleng	Warren Foster	Ken Champin, Virgil Ross, Arthur Davis & Manuel Perez	Tweety; Sylvester; Granny	June 27, 1953	N/A
Granny and Tweety have to deal with a bunch of Sylvesters (who are in this cartoon stand-ins for the Indigenous peoples of the Americas) as they cross the country in a wagon.
684	17	Wild Over You	LT	Chuck Jones	Michael Maltese	Ben Washam, Lloyd Vaughan, Richard Thompson, Abe Levitow & Ken Harris	Pepé Le Pew	July 11, 1953	DVD: Super Stars' Pepé Le Pew
In the Paris Exposition of 1900, a wildcat escapes from a Parisian zoo and paints herself to look like a skunk. The actual skunk Pepé Le Pew gets mauled when he tries to fall in love with her.
685	18	Duck Dodgers in the 24½th Century	MM	Chuck Jones	Michael Maltese	Lloyd Vaughan, Ken Harris & Ben Washam; Harry Love (effects)	Daffy Duck; Porky Pig; Marvin the Martian; Dr. I.Q. Hi	July 23, 1953	DVD: Golden Collection: Vol. 1 DVD: The Essential Daffy Duck; Blu-Ray/DVD: Platinum Collection: Vol. 1
In the second half of 24th century, Duck Dodgers flies with the "Eager Young Space Cadet" to the uncharted "Planet X" and encounters Marvin the Martian.
686	19	Bully for Bugs	LT	Chuck Jones	Michael Maltese	Ben Washam, Lloyd Vaughan & Ken Harris	Bugs Bunny	August 8, 1953	DVD: Golden Collection: Vol. 1 Blu-Ray/DVD: Platinum Collection: Vol. 3
Bugs Bunny faces off against a bull in Spain.
687	20	Plop Goes the Weasel	LT	Robert McKimson	Tedd Pierce	Herman Cohen, Rod Scribner, Phil DeLara & Charles McKimson	Foghorn Leghorn; Barnyard Dawg	August 22, 1953	Blu-Ray: Collector's Choice: Vol. 1
Foghorn Leghorn antagonizes Barnyard Dawg when he's trying to guard the baby chickens from a hungry weasel.
688	21	Cat-Tails for Two	MM	Robert McKimson	Tedd Pierce	Rod Scribner, Phil DeLara, Charles McKimson & Herman Cohen	Speedy Gonzales	August 29, 1953	DVD: Golden Collection: Vol. 4 Blu-Ray: Collector's Vault: Vol. 1
Two cats named George and Benny try to catch Speedy Gonzales (in his debut) on a Mexican ship, but he's too fast for them.
689	22	A Street Cat Named Sylvester	LT	Friz Freleng	Warren Foster	Virgil Ross, Arthur Davis, Manuel Perez & Ken Champin	Tweety; Sylvester; Granny; Hector the Bulldog	September 5, 1953	Blu-Ray: Collector's Vault: Vol. 2
Tweety, out in the cold, goes into a nearby house for salvation. Unfortunately for him, it is in a house with Sylvester, who tries to eat him.
690	23	Zipping Along	MM	Chuck Jones	Michael Maltese	Ken Harris, Ben Washam & Lloyd Vaughan	Wile E. Coyote and the Road Runner	September 15, 1953	DVD: Golden Collection: Vol. 2 Blu-Ray/DVD: Platinum Collection: Vol. 2
Wile E. Coyote tries to catch the Road Runner yet again.
691	24	Lumber Jack-Rabbit	LT	Chuck Jones	Michael Maltese	Ben Washam, Lloyd Vaughan, Richard Thompson, Abe Levitow & Ken Harris	Bugs Bunny	September 26, 1953	DVD: Super Stars' Bugs Bunny (cropped to 16:9 widescreen); Blu-Ray: Bugs Bunny 80th Anniversary Collection (original 4:3 aspect ratio)
Bugs Bunny wanders into Paul Bunyan's property, where he has to contend with his 124-foot-tall dog. Note: Advertised as a 3-D film.
692	25	Duck! Rabbit, Duck!	MM	Chuck Jones	Michael Maltese	Ken Harris, Ben Washam, Lloyd Vaughan, Richard Thompson & Abe Levitow	Bugs Bunny; Daffy Duck; Elmer Fudd	October 3, 1953	DVD: Golden Collection: Vol. 3 Blu-Ray/DVD: Platinum Collection: Vol. 2
A follow-up to Rabbit Seasoning, but this time in winter.
693	26	Easy Peckin's	LT	Robert McKimson	Tedd Pierce	Charles McKimson, Herman Cohen, Rod Scribner & Phil DeLara	N/A (one-shot cartoon)	October 17, 1953	Blu-Ray: Collector's Vault: Vol. 1
A fox tries to steal chickens from a chicken coop, but a rooster keeps thwarting him.
694	27	Catty Cornered	MM	Friz Freleng	Warren Foster	Arthur Davis, Manuel Perez, Ken Champin & Virgil Ross	Tweety; Sylvester; Rocky	October 31, 1953	Blu-Ray: Collector's Choice: Vol. 2
Rocky kidnaps Tweety, but Sylvester (who Tweety mistakenly thinks is trying to save him) tries to catch him for his own supper, even if it means dealing with Rocky and his henchman.
695	28	Of Rice and Hen	LT	Robert McKimson	Warren Foster	Herman Cohen, Rod Scribner, Phil DeLara & Charles McKimson	Foghorn Leghorn; Miss Prissy; Barnyard Dawg	November 14, 1953	Blu-Ray: Collector's Choice: Vol. 3
When the other hens badmouth her and say she'll never find a man, Miss Prissy tries to commit suicide. When Foghorn Leghorn saves her, she decides to make him her husband.
696	29	Cats A-Weigh!	MM	Robert McKimson	Tedd Pierce	Phil DeLara, Charles McKimson, Herman Cohen & Rod Scribner	Hippety Hopper; Sylvester; Sylvester Jr.	November 28, 1953	DVD: Super Stars' Sylvester & Hippety Hopper
Sylvester and his son Sylvester Jr. get jobs as mousers on a boat, but Sylvester just lounges while Jr. catches all the mice. Sylvester promises to Jr. that if he catches small mice, he'll get big mice. Enter "big mouse" Hippety Hopper.
697	30	Robot Rabbit	LT	Friz Freleng	Warren Foster	Virgil Ross, Arthur Davis, Manuel Perez & Ken Champin	Bugs Bunny; Elmer Fudd	December 12, 1953	Blu-Ray: Bugs Bunny 80th Anniversary Collection
Elmer Fudd tries to use a robot to capture Bugs Bunny to stop him from eating his carrots.
698	31	Punch Trunk	LT	Chuck Jones	Michael Maltese	Lloyd Vaughan, Ken Harris & Ben Washam	N/A (one-shot cartoon)	December 19, 1953	DVD: Golden Collection: Vol. 6 (extra, unrestored); Blu-Ray: Collector's Choice: Vol. 3 (restored)
A five-inch-tall elephant disturbs greatly a city.

== 1954 ==
No. overall	No. in year	Title	Series	Directed by	Story by	Animated by	Recurring characters	Original release date	Official DVD/Blu-Ray Availability
699	1	Dog Pounded	LT	Friz Freleng	Warren Foster	Manuel Perez, Ken Champin, Virgil Ross & Arthur Davis	Tweety; Sylvester; Hector the Bulldog; Pepé Le Pew (cameo)	January 2, 1954	DVD: Super Stars' Pepé Le Pew; Blu-Ray/DVD: Platinum Collection: Vol. 3
Similar to Ain't She Tweet, but with Sylvester trying to avoid dogs in a city dog pound instead.
700	2	Captain Hareblower	MM	Friz Freleng	Warren Foster	Manuel Perez, Ken Champin, Virgil Ross & Arthur Davis	Bugs Bunny; Yosemite Sam	January 16, 1954	Blu-Ray: Bugs Bunny 80th Anniversary Collection
Bugs Bunny confronts Sam the Pirate when Sam takes over a ship Bugs was aboard on, resulting in the two having a duel.
701	3	I Gopher You	MM	Friz Freleng	Warren Foster	Ken Champin, Virgil Ross, Arthur Davis & Manuel Perez	Goofy Gophers	January 30, 1954	Blu-Ray: Collector's Vault: Vol. 2
When a man in a truck takes the Goofy Gophers's vegetables away, they go on a quest to get them back from the food processing plant.
702	4	Feline Frame-Up	LT	Chuck Jones	Michael Maltese	Richard Thompson & Abe Levitow	Claude Cat; Marc Antony and Pussyfoot	February 13, 1954	Blu-Ray/DVD: Platinum Collection: Vol. 1
Claude Cat, tired of both Pussyfoot stealing his pillow and getting beaten up by Marc Antony, manages to convince his owners Marc Antony was trying to eat Pussyfoot, which gets him kicked out of the house. Marc Antony now must work his way back inside to protect Pussyfoot from Claude.
703	5	Wild Wife	MM	Robert McKimson	Tedd Pierce	Rod Scribner, Charles McKimson, Phil DeLara & Herman Cohen	N/A (one-shot cartoon)	February 20, 1954	DVD: Golden Collection: Vol. 6
A housewife named Marsha finds herself stressed with house chores, errands, and taking care of her children...and her obnoxious, selfish husband John isn't helping.
704	6	No Barking	MM	Chuck Jones	Michael Maltese	Ken Harris	Claude Cat; Frisky Puppy; Tweety (cameo); Marc Antony (cameo)	February 27, 1954	DVD: Golden Collection: Vol. 3
Claude Cat is trying to get some food at a junkyard, but Frisky Puppy's constant barking and attacking him isn't helping.
705	7	Bugs and Thugs	LT	Friz Freleng	Warren Foster	Manuel Perez, Ken Champin, Virgil Ross & Arthur Davis	Bugs Bunny; Rocky and Mugsy	March 2, 1954	DVD: Golden Collection: Vol. 1 Blu-Ray/DVD: Platinum Collection: Vol. 3
Bugs Bunny mistakes the getaway car of bank robbers Rocky and Mugsy for a taxi and enters it uninvited, being taken hostage as a result.
706	8	The Cats Bah	LT	Chuck Jones	Michael Maltese	Ben Washam & Lloyd Vaughan	Pepé Le Pew; Penelope Pussycat	March 20, 1954	DVD: Super Stars' Pepé Le Pew
Pepé Le Pew recounts a story of how he found the "love of his life", Penelope Pussycat with a white stripe accidentally placed on her back.
707	9	Design for Leaving	LT	Robert McKimson	Tedd Pierce	Phil DeLara, Charles McKimson, Herman Cohen & Rod Scribner	Daffy Duck; Elmer Fudd	March 27, 1954	DVD: Super Stars' Daffy Duck (cropped to 16:9 widescreen)
Daffy Duck is a salesman who turns Elmer Fudd's house into a futuristic push-button one, none of which work quite right.
708	10	Bell Hoppy	MM	Robert McKimson	Tedd Pierce	Charles McKimson, Herman Cohen, Rod Scribner & Phil DeLara	Hippety Hopper; Sylvester	April 17, 1954	DVD: Super Stars' Sylvester & Hippety Hopper
Sylvester tries to join a cat fraternity, but they'll only let him join if he can tie a bell around the biggest mouse he can find. He tries to do so on "big mouse" Hippety Hopper.
709	11	No Parking Hare	LT	Robert McKimson	Sid Marcus	Herman Cohen, Rod Scribner, Phil DeLara & Charles McKimson	Bugs Bunny	May 1, 1954	Blu-Ray: Bugs Bunny 80th Anniversary Collection
Bugs Bunny confronts a construction worker who tries to destroy his home for a freeway.
710	12	Dr. Jerkyl's Hide	LT	Friz Freleng	Warren Foster	Arthur Davis, Manuel Perez, Ken Champin & Virgil Ross	Spike and Chester; Sylvester	May 8, 1954	Blu-Ray: Collector's Vault: Vol. 2
Spike and Chester again agitate Sylvester, who hides in the house of Dr. Jerkyl and Mr. Hyde. He drinks "soda pop" that turns him into a stronger monster cat who effortlessly beats up Spike.
711	13	Claws for Alarm	MM	Chuck Jones	Michael Maltese	Lloyd Vaughan, Ken Harris, Ben Washam, Abe Levitow & Richard Thompson	Porky Pig; Sylvester	May 22, 1954	DVD: Golden Collection: Vol. 3 Blu-Ray: Collector's Vault: Vol. 2
Porky Pig and Sylvester stay the night at a hotel, where Sylvester keeps having to protect Porky from mice trying to kill them.
712	14	Little Boy Boo	LT	Robert McKimson	Tedd Pierce	Herman Cohen, Rod Scribner, Phil DeLara & Charles McKimson	Foghorn Leghorn; Miss Prissy; Egghead Jr.	June 5, 1954	DVD: Super Stars' Foghorn Leghorn & Friends; Blu-Ray: Collector's Vault: Vol. 1
Foghorn Leghorn tries to woo the widowed Miss Prissy to get into her warm house to brave the upcoming winter. But there is one catch; Foghorn has to prove he can be a good father to her quiet, very intelligent glasses wearing son, Egghead Jr. (in his debut cartoon).
713	15	Devil May Hare	LT	Robert McKimson	Sid Marcus	Herman Cohen, Rod Scribner, Phil DeLara & Charles McKimson	Bugs Bunny; Tasmanian Devil	June 19, 1954	DVD: Golden Collection: Vol. 1 Blu-Ray/DVD: Platinum Collection: Vol. 1
In his debut appearance, the Tasmanian Devil tries to eat Bugs Bunny.
714	16	Muzzle Tough	MM	Friz Freleng	Warren Foster	Ken Champin, Virgil Ross, Arthur Davis & Manuel Perez	Tweety; Sylvester; Granny; Hector the Bulldog	June 26, 1954	Blu-Ray: Collector's Choice: Vol. 4
Sylvester tries to catch Tweety, who has just moved into a new home with his owner Granny. But it won't be so simple; Granny also has a bulldog, too.
715	17	The Oily American	MM	Robert McKimson	Sid Marcus	Phil DeLara, Charles McKimson, Herman Cohen & Rod Scribner	N/A (one-shot cartoon)	July 10, 1954	DVD: Golden Collection: Vol. 6
A very rich man named Moe and his butler go hunting for moose in his vast backyard.
716	18	Bewitched Bunny	LT	Chuck Jones	Michael Maltese	Lloyd Vaughan, Ken Harris & Ben Washam	Bugs Bunny; Witch Hazel	July 24, 1954	DVD: Golden Collection: Vol. 5 Blu-Ray/DVD: Platinum Collection: Vol. 1
In a re-telling of the Hansel and Gretel story, Bugs Bunny disguises himself as a truant officer and saves the twin siblings from the evil Witch Hazel. When he helps them escape, Witch Hazel then goes after him.
717	19	Satan's Waitin'	LT	Friz Freleng	Warren Foster	Virgil Ross, Arthur Davis, Manuel Perez & Ken Champin	Tweety; Sylvester; Mugsy	August 7, 1954	DVD: Golden Collection: Vol. 6 DVD: Super Stars' Tweety & Sylvester; Blu-Ray/DVD: Platinum Collection: Vol. 3
Sylvester has used up eight of his nine lives, and he tries to make his final one last.
718	20	Stop! Look! And Hasten!	MM	Chuck Jones	Michael Maltese	Richard Thompson & Abe Levitow; Harry Love (effects)	Wile E. Coyote and the Road Runner	August 14, 1954	DVD: Golden Collection: Vol. 2 Blu-Ray: Collector's Vault: Vol. 2
A famished Wile E. Coyote sets his eyes on the Road Runner.
719	21	Yankee Doodle Bugs	LT	Friz Freleng	Warren Foster	Arthur Davis, Manuel Perez & Virgil Ross	Bugs Bunny; Clyde Bunny	August 28, 1954	Blu-Ray: Bugs Bunny 80th Anniversary Collection
Bugs Bunny tells his nephew Clyde (very factually incorrect) history lessons.
720	22	Gone Batty	LT	Robert McKimson	Sid Marcus & Ben Washam	Charles McKimson, Herman Cohen, Rod Scribner & Phil DeLara	Bobo the Elephant	September 4, 1954	DVD: Super Stars' Porky & Friends
Similar to Baseball Bugs, but with Bobo the Elephant instead of Bugs Bunny.
721	23	Goo Goo Goliath	MM	Friz Freleng	Warren Foster	Arthur Davis, Manuel Perez, Ken Champin & Virgil Ross	The Drunk Stork	September 18, 1954	DVD: Golden Collection: Vol. 6
A couple have a baby the size of their house.
722	24	By Word of Mouse	LT	Friz Freleng	Warren Foster	Gerry Chiniquy, Arthur Davis, Ben Washam & Ted Bonnicksen	Sylvester	October 2, 1954	DVD: Golden Collection: Vol. 6
Hans, a mouse from Germany, arrives in America to visit his cousin, Willie, who takes Hans to see a mouse lecturer from a university, to learn about the capitalist system. All the while, the three mice are chased by Sylvester. Note: Co-produced by the Sloan Foundation.
723	25	From A to Z-Z-Z-Z	LT	Chuck Jones	Michael Maltese	Ken Harris, Ben Washam & Lloyd Vaughan	Ralph Phillips	October 16, 1954	DVD: Golden Collection: Vol. 2 (extra, unrestored); DVD: Warner Bros. Home Entertainment Academy Awards Animation Collection (restored); Blu-Ray/DVD: Platinum Collection: Vol. 1 (restored)
A boy named Ralph Phillips keeps daydreaming at school. Note: Nominated for the Academy Award for Best Animated Short Film in 1954.
724	26	Quack Shot	MM	Robert McKimson	Phil DeLara	Rod Scribner, Phil DeLara, Charles McKimson & Herman Cohen	Daffy Duck; Elmer Fudd	October 30, 1954	Blu-Ray: Collector's Choice: Vol. 4
Daffy Duck goes up against Elmer Fudd at a pond to defend the other ducks from him.
725	27	My Little Duckaroo	MM	Chuck Jones	Michael Maltese	Ken Harris, Ben Washam, Abe Levitow, Richard Thompson & Lloyd Vaughan	Daffy Duck; Porky Pig; Nasty Canasta	November 27, 1954	DVD: Golden Collection: Vol. 6 DVD: The Essential Daffy Duck; Blu-Ray/DVD: Platinum Collection: Vol. 2
In a follow-up to Drip-Along Daffy, The Masked Avenger and his comic relief once again confront Nasty Canasta.
726	28	Sheep Ahoy	MM	Chuck Jones	Michael Maltese	Richard Thompson & Abe Levitow	Ralph Wolf and Sam Sheepdog; Wile E. Coyote (cameo)	December 11, 1954	Blu-Ray: Collector's Choice: Vol. 3
Fred Sheepdog once again tries to stop George Wolf from stealing sheep from 9 a.m. to 5 p.m.
727	29	Baby Buggy Bunny	MM	Chuck Jones	Michael Maltese	Abe Levitow, Lloyd Vaughan, Ken Harris & Ben Washam	Bugs Bunny	December 18, 1954	DVD: Golden Collection: Vol. 2 Blu-Ray: Bugs Bunny 80th Anniversary Collection
A short man named Ant Hill Harry, a.k.a., Baby-Face Finster, disguises himself as a baby and infiltrates Bugs Bunny's house.

== 1955 ==
No. overall	No. in year	Title	Series	Directed by	Story by	Animated by	Recurring characters	Original release date	Official DVD/Blu-Ray Availability
728	1	Pizzicato Pussycat	MM	Friz Freleng	Warren Foster	Virgil Ross & Manuel Perez	N/A (one-shot cartoon)	January 1, 1955	DVD: Golden Collection: Vol. 4 Blu-Ray: Collector's Vault: Vol. 3
A cat nearly eats a mouse, who happens to be a skilled pianist. They cut a deal; the cat will spare his life in exchange for the mouse taking the credit of the cat's piano skills.
729	2	Feather Dusted	MM	Robert McKimson	Tedd Pierce	Charles McKimson, Herman Cohen, Phil DeLara & Rod Scribner	Foghorn Leghorn; Miss Prissy; Egghead Jr.	January 15, 1955	Blu-Ray: Collector's Vault: Vol. 1
While Miss Prissy is away, Foghorn Leghorn tries to get her son Egghead Jr. to play games with him.
730	3	Pests for Guests	MM	Friz Freleng	Warren Foster	Virgil Ross, Arthur Davis, Manuel Perez & Ken Champin	Elmer Fudd; Goofy Gophers	January 29, 1955	Blu-Ray: Collector's Vault: Vol. 2
The Goofy Gophers decide to store their nuts for the winter in a drawer they find, which is soon bought by Elmer Fudd, who has to deal with their antics.
731	4	Beanstalk Bunny	MM	Chuck Jones	Michael Maltese	Ken Harris, Richard Thompson, Abe Levitow & Keith Darling	Bugs Bunny; Daffy Duck; Elmer Fudd	February 12, 1955	Blu-Ray: Collector's Choice: Vol. 1
In a re-telling of "Jack and the Beanstalk", Daffy Duck buys beans from a salesman and tosses them, bringing him - and by accident Bugs Bunny - up to a castle in the sky, where they contend with a giant Elmer Fudd.
732	5	All Fowled Up	LT	Robert McKimson	Charles McKimson & Sid Marcus	Phil DeLara, Richard Thompson & Keith Darling	Foghorn Leghorn; Henery Hawk; Barnyard Dawg	February 19, 1955	DVD: Super Stars' Foghorn Leghorn & Friends
As Foghorn Leghorn exercises after his encounter with Barnyard Dawg, Henery Hawk tries eating Foghorn after he stopped him from getting a chicken earlier.
733	6	Stork Naked	MM	Friz Freleng	Warren Foster	Arthur Davis, Virgil Ross & Manuel Perez	Daffy Duck; The Drunk Stork	February 26, 1955	DVD: Super Stars' Daffy Duck (cropped to 16:9 widescreen); Blu-Ray: Collector's Choice: Vol. 4 (extra, original 4:3 aspect ratio)
Daffy Duck tries to stop a stork from bringing a baby into his home.
734	7	Lighthouse Mouse	MM	Robert McKimson	Sid Marcus	Phil DeLara, Charles McKimson, Herman Cohen & Rod Scribner	Hippety Hopper; Sylvester	March 12, 1955	DVD: Super Stars' Sylvester & Hippety Hopper
A mouse living in a lighthouse, suffering from insomnia from the light shining in his eye, turns off the light, while Sylvester (who lives there) has to keep turning it back on. Unfortunately for him, things get further complicated when Hippety Hopper enters the picture as well.
735	8	Sahara Hare	LT	Friz Freleng	Warren Foster	Gerry Chiniquy, Ted Bonnicksen & Arthur Davis	Bugs Bunny; Yosemite Sam; Daffy Duck (cameo)	March 26, 1955	DVD: Golden Collection: Vol. 4
Bugs Bunny encounters Riff Raff Sam in the Sahara Desert.
736	9	Sandy Claws	LT	Friz Freleng	Arthur Davis & Warren Foster	Arthur Davis, Manuel Perez & Virgil Ross	Tweety; Sylvester; Granny	April 2, 1955	DVD: Warner Bros. Home Entertainment Academy Awards Animation Collection; Blu-Ray/DVD: Platinum Collection: Vol. 3
Tweety and Granny go to the beach, but a high tide washes Tweety away. Sylvester, wanting to eat Tweety, is mistaken for trying to help him, with Granny even offering him assistance. Note: Nominated for the Academy Award for Best Animated Short Film in 1955.
737	10	The Hole Idea	LT	Robert McKimson	Sid Marcus	Robert McKimson	N/A (one-shot cartoon)	April 16, 1955	DVD: Golden Collection: Vol. 6
A man creates a literal portable hole that goes through walls and surfaces, impressing everyone...except his wife.
738	11	Ready, Set, Zoom!	LT	Chuck Jones	Michael Maltese	Ben Washam, Abe Levitow, Richard Thompson, Lloyd Vaughan & Ken Harris	Wile E. Coyote and the Road Runner	April 30, 1955	DVD: Golden Collection: Vol. 2 Blu-Ray: Collector's Vault: Vol. 2
The never-ending chase between Wile E. Coyote and the Road Runner continues.
739	12	Hare Brush	MM	Friz Freleng	Warren Foster	Ted Bonnicksen, Arthur Davis & Gerry Chiniquy	Bugs Bunny; Elmer Fudd	May 7, 1955	Blu-Ray: Bugs Bunny 80th Anniversary Collection
Millionaire Elmer Fudd comes in to work one day thinking he's a rabbit. While recovering at a sanatorium, he tricks Bugs Bunny into taking his place, even being hypnotized by a psychiatrist into thinking he's Elmer Fudd.
740	13	Past Perfumance	MM	Chuck Jones	Michael Maltese	Ken Harris, Richard Thompson & Lloyd Vaughan	Pepé Le Pew; Penelope Pussycat	May 21, 1955	DVD: Super Stars' Pepé Le Pew; Blu-Ray: Collector's Vault: Vol. 1
In 1913 Paris, Pepé Le Pew chases Penelope Pussycat in a movie studio across various sets when she has a stripe placed on her back by a film director, who runs away from Pepé's stench.
741	14	Tweety's Circus	MM	Friz Freleng	Warren Foster	Arthur Davis, Gerry Chiniquy & Ted Bonnicksen	Tweety; Sylvester	June 4, 1955	Blu-Ray: Collector's Vault: Vol. 1
Sylvester wanders into a circus, where he tries to eat Tweety.
742	15	Rabbit Rampage	LT	Chuck Jones	Michael Maltese	Ben Washam	Bugs Bunny; Elmer Fudd (cameo)	June 11, 1955	DVD: Golden Collection: Vol. 6 (extra); Blu-Ray: Collector's Choice: Vol. 2
Bugs Bunny wakes up to find an animator messing with his life.
743	16	Lumber Jerks	LT	Friz Freleng	Warren Foster	Arthur Davis, Virgil Ross & Manuel Perez; Harry Love (effects)	Goofy Gophers	June 25, 1955	DVD: Golden Collection: Vol. 1
When the majority of their new tree home is taken away to a lumberjack mill, the Goofy Gophers go on a mission to get it back.
744	17	This Is a Life?	MM	Friz Freleng	Warren Foster	Ted Bonnicksen & Arthur Davis	Bugs Bunny; Daffy Duck; Elmer Fudd; Yosemite Sam; Granny	July 9, 1955	DVD: Super Stars' Daffy Duck (cropped to 16:9 widescreen); Blu-Ray: Bugs Bunny 80th Anniversary Collection (original 4:3 aspect ratio)
In a parody of This Is Your Life, Elmer Fudd hosts a clip show where they honor Bugs Bunny...who is unaware it is a trap set up by Elmer and Yosemite Sam to finally get rid of him once and for all.
745	18	Double or Mutton	LT	Chuck Jones	Michael Maltese	Richard Thompson, Abe Levitow, Keith Darling & Ken Harris	Ralph Wolf and Sam Sheepdog	July 23, 1955	Blu-Ray: Collector's Choice: Vol. 4 Blu-Ray: Collector's Vault: Vol. 1
Ralph Wolf and Sam Sheepdog (their first cartoon with their proper names) yet again go about their 9-to-5 job: Ralph trying to get sheep, and Sam stopping him every step of the way.
746	19	Jumpin' Jupiter	MM	Chuck Jones	Michael Maltese	Ken Harris, Keith Darling, Abe Levitow & Richard Thompson; Harry Love (effects)	Porky Pig; Sylvester	August 6, 1955	DVD: Golden Collection: Vol. 6 Blu-Ray: Collector's Vault: Vol. 2
Porky Pig and Sylvester end up being abducted by aliens, but only Sylvester notices them.
747	20	A Kiddies Kitty	MM	Friz Freleng	Warren Foster	Arthur Davis, Gerry Chiniquy & Ted Bonnicksen	Sylvester; Hector the Bulldog	August 20, 1955	Blu-Ray: Collector's Vault: Vol. 1
Sylvester hides from a dog by jumping into a backyard. There a little girl named Suzanne adopts him as her pet, but she might be even worse than the dog he was trying to escape from!
748	21	Hyde and Hare	LT	Friz Freleng	Warren Foster	Gerry Chiniquy, Virgil Ross, Arthur Davis & Ted Bonnicksen	Bugs Bunny	August 21, 1955	DVD: Golden Collection: Vol. 2 Blu-Ray: Collector's Vault: Vol. 2
Bugs Bunny is adopted by a kindly old man...who just so happens to be none other than Dr. Jekyll, who keeps turning into Mr. Hyde and trying to kill Bugs.
749	22	Dime to Retire	LT	Robert McKimson	Sid Marcus	Robert McKimson & Keith Darling	Daffy Duck; Porky Pig	September 3, 1955	DVD: Super Stars' Daffy Duck (cropped to 16:9 widescreen)
Porky Pig stays the night at Daffy Duck's inn, whose rooms are suspiciously only ten cents.
750	23	Speedy Gonzales	MM	Friz Freleng	Warren Foster	Gerry Chiniquy, Ted Bonnicksen & Arthur Davis	Speedy Gonzales; Sylvester	September 17, 1955	DVD: Golden Collection: Vol. 1 DVD: Warner Bros. Home Entertainment Academy Awards Animation Collection; Blu-Ray/DVD: Platinum Collection: Vol. 1
In their first pairing together, Speedy Gonzales (newly designed by Freleng's team) tries to get cheese for his starving friends, but has to contend with Sylvester. Note: Won the Academy Award for Best Animated Short Film in 1956.
751	24	Knight-mare Hare	MM	Chuck Jones	Tedd Pierce	Ken Harris, Ben Washam, Abe Levitow & Richard Thompson	Bugs Bunny	October 1, 1955	DVD: Golden Collection: Vol. 4
Bugs Bunny finds himself transported back to medieval England.
752	25	Two Scent's Worth	MM	Chuck Jones	Chuck Jones	Keith Darling, Richard Thompson, Abe Levitow & Ken Harris	Pepé Le Pew; Penelope Pussycat	October 15, 1955	DVD: Super Stars' Pepé Le Pew
In the French Alps, a robber lures away Penelope Pussycat (named Fifi in this cartoon) from her home and paints her like a skunk to rob banks. But when a real skunk, Pepé Le Pew, drives him away with his scent, Pepé sets his eyes not on the money, but on Penelope herself.
753	26	Red Riding Hoodwinked	LT	Friz Freleng	Warren Foster	Arthur Davis, Gerry Chiniquy & Ted Bonnicksen	Tweety; Sylvester; Granny	October 29, 1955	DVD: Golden Collection: Vol. 5 Blu-Ray: Collector's Vault: Vol. 1
A re-telling of "Little Red Riding Hood" featuring Tweety and Sylvester.
754	27	Roman Legion-Hare	LT	Friz Freleng	Warren Foster	Virgil Ross, Arthur Davis & Gerry Chiniquy	Bugs Bunny; Yosemite Sam	November 12, 1955	DVD: Golden Collection: Vol. 4
In 54 AD Rome, Nero makes his captain of the guards, Yosemite Sam, find a new victim to feed to the lions at the Coliseum. He ends up choosing Bugs Bunny, who is less than cooperative.
755	28	Heir-Conditioned	LT	Friz Freleng	Warren Foster	Arthur Davis, Gerry Chiniquy & Virgil Ross	Elmer Fudd; Sylvester; Tweety (cameo)	November 26, 1955	DVD: Golden Collection: Vol. 6
When his owner dies, Sylvester inherits her entire fortune, with Elmer Fudd becoming his financial advisor, who suggests he should invest his money instead of spending it. Note: Co-produced by the Sloan Foundation.
756	29	Guided Muscle	LT	Chuck Jones	Michael Maltese	Richard Thompson, Ken Harris, Ben Washam & Abe Levitow	Wile E. Coyote and the Road Runner	December 10, 1955	DVD: Golden Collection: Vol. 2 Blu-Ray/DVD: Platinum Collection: Vol. 3
Wile E. Coyote once more tries to catch the Road Runner.
757	30	Pappy's Puppy	MM	Friz Freleng	Warren Foster	Gerry Chiniquy	Sylvester; The Drunk Stork	December 17, 1955	N/A
Butch the bulldog has a new baby pup, who uses Sylvester like a chew toy. Whenever Sylvester hurts or endangers the pup, Butch pays the cat back in pain multiple times fold.
758	31	One Froggy Evening	MM	Chuck Jones	Michael Maltese	Abe Levitow, Richard Thompson, Ken Harris & Ben Washam	Michigan J. Frog	December 31, 1955	DVD: Golden Collection: Vol. 2 Blu-Ray/DVD: Platinum Collection: Vol. 1
A man discovers a frog who can sing, but he only sings for him and nobody else. Note: Added to the National Film Registry in 2003.

== 1956 ==
No. overall	No. in year	Title	Series	Directed by	Story by	Animated by	Recurring characters	Original release date	Official DVD/Blu-Ray Availability
759	1	Bugs' Bonnets	MM	Chuck Jones	Tedd Pierce	Ben Washam, Abe Levitow, Richard Thompson & Ken Harris	Bugs Bunny; Elmer Fudd	January 14, 1956	DVD: Golden Collection: Vol. 5
Bugs Bunny and Elmer Fudd change into various personas when they wear various hats.
760	2	Too Hop To Handle	LT	Robert McKimson	Warren Foster	Robert McKimson & Keith Darling	Hippety Hopper; Sylvester; Sylvester Jr.	January 28, 1956	DVD: Super Stars' Sylvester & Hippety Hopper
Sylvester Jr. makes a pipe like the Pied Piper of Hamelin to attract mice after Sylvester fails to find his son any mice to hunt. He ends up summoning "giant mouse" Hippety Hopper, who just escaped from the zoo.
761	3	Weasel Stop	LT	Robert McKimson	Tedd Pierce	Keith Darling, Ted Bonnicksen & Russ Dyson	Foghorn Leghorn	February 11, 1956	DVD: Super Stars' Foghorn Leghorn & Friends
Foghorn Leghorn cooperates with a small but very hungry weasel who wants to eat the chickens, solely to get back at a dog he considers too lazy to be guarding against said chickens.
762	4	The High and the Flighty	MM	Robert McKimson	Tedd Pierce	Ted Bonnicksen, Russ Dyson & Keith Darling	Daffy Duck; Foghorn Leghorn; Barnyard Dawg	February 18, 1956	Blu-Ray/DVD: Platinum Collection: Vol. 2
Daffy Duck is a salesman who tries to profiteer off of Foghorn Leghorn and Barnyard Dawg's feud.
763	5	Broom-Stick Bunny	LT	Chuck Jones	Tedd Pierce	Richard Thompson, Ken Harris, Ben Washam & Abe Levitow	Bugs Bunny; Witch Hazel	February 28, 1956	DVD: Golden Collection: Vol. 2 Blu-Ray/DVD: Platinum Collection: Vol. 1
On Halloween night, Witch Hazel encounters Bugs Bunny, who's trick-or-treating as a witch. But when he reveals to her he's actually a rabbit (the last ingredient Witch Hazel needs for her potion), she tries to capture Bugs.
764	6	Rocket Squad	MM	Chuck Jones	Tedd Pierce	Ken Harris, Ben Washam, Abe Levitow & Richard Thompson	Daffy Duck; Porky Pig	March 10, 1956	DVD: Golden Collection: Vol. 3
In a space-themed parody of both Dragnet and Racket Squad, Joe Friday and Det. Schmoe Tuesday pursue the Flying Saucer Bandit.
765	7	Tweet and Sour	LT	Friz Freleng	Warren Foster	Virgil Ross, Arthur Davis & Gerry Chiniquy	Tweety; Sylvester; Granny; Sam Cat	March 24, 1956	Blu-Ray: Collector's Vault: Vol. 3
Granny threatens Sylvester with "selling him to the violin string factory" if even one feather of Tweety's is out of place. When Sam Cat tries to get Tweety, Sylvester has no choice but to protect Tweety from him.
766	8	Heaven Scent	MM	Chuck Jones	Chuck Jones	Abe Levitow, Richard Thompson, Ken Harris & Ben Washam	Pepé Le Pew; Penelope Pussycat	March 31, 1956	DVD: Golden Collection: Vol. 6 DVD: Super Stars' Pepé Le Pew
Tired of being bullied by dogs, Penelope Pussycat paints a stripe down her back to make them think she's a skunk to ward them off. While she succeeds in that, she also attracts Pepé Le Pew, an actual skunk.
767	9	Mixed Master	LT	Robert McKimson	Tedd Pierce	Russ Dyson, Keith Darling, Ted Bonnicksen & George Grandpré	N/A (one-shot cartoon)	April 14, 1956	N/A
Harry gets a second dog named Robert for his home to be a playmate for their other dog Chang, despite his wife Alice's objections. While initially a runt, Robert soon gets very big, but Alice warns Harry if he and Chang don't get along, Robert will have to go.
768	10	Rabbitson Crusoe	LT	Friz Freleng	Warren Foster	Arthur Davis, Gerry Chiniquy & Virgil Ross	Bugs Bunny; Yosemite Sam	April 28, 1956	Blu-Ray: Bugs Bunny 80th Anniversary Collection
In a parody of Robinson Crusoe, Yosemite Sam has been stuck on a deserted island by himself for 20 years, where he's eaten nothing but coconuts, all the while fighting off a shark named Dopey Dick. So when Bugs Bunny drifts along, Sam is more than happy to eat him.
769	11	Gee Whiz-z-z-z-z-z-z	LT	Chuck Jones	Michael Maltese	Ben Washam, Abe Levitow, Richard Thompson & Ken Harris	Wile E. Coyote and the Road Runner	May 5, 1956	DVD: Golden Collection: Vol. 2 Blu-Ray: Collector's Vault: Vol. 1
More of the never-ending chase between Wile E. Coyote and the Road Runner.
770	12	Tree Cornered Tweety	MM	Friz Freleng	Warren Foster	Arthur Davis, Gerry Chiniquy & Virgil Ross	Tweety; Sylvester	May 19, 1956	Blu-Ray: Collector's Vault: Vol. 3
Tweety, narrating in the style of Dragnet, describes how Sylvester tried to capture him over the course of months.
771	13	The Unexpected Pest	MM	Robert McKimson	Warren Foster	Keith Darling, Ted Bonnicksen, George Grandpré & Russ Dyson	Sylvester	June 2, 1956	DVD: Golden Collection: Vol. 4
Sylvester's stay in his home is in peril when his owners threaten to send him away, so he captures an outside mouse to keep his home. But when the mouse realizes he has the power among the two of them, he keeps putting himself in dangerous scenarios, and Sylvester must keep stopping him.
772	14	Napoleon Bunny-Part	MM	Friz Freleng	Warren Foster	Gerry Chiniquy, Virgil Ross & Arthur Davis	Bugs Bunny; Mugsy	June 16, 1956	DVD: Super Stars' Bugs Bunny (cropped to 16:9 widescreen); Blu-Ray: Bugs Bunny 80th Anniversary Collection (original 4:3 aspect ratio)
Bugs Bunny encounters Napoleon, who thinks he's a spy, and tries to kill him.
773	15	Tugboat Granny	MM	Friz Freleng	Warren Foster	Virgil Ross, Arthur Davis & Gerry Chiniquy	Tweety; Sylvester; Granny	June 23, 1956	Blu-Ray: Collector's Choice: Vol. 3
Sylvester tries to capture Tweety on a tugboat.
774	16	Stupor Duck	LT	Robert McKimson	Tedd Pierce	Ted Bonnicksen, George Grandpré, Russ Dyson & Keith Darling	Daffy Duck	July 7, 1956	DVD: Golden Collection: Vol. 5
Daffy Duck plays a Superman-style hero, but he only makes things worse.
775	17	Barbary Coast Bunny	LT	Chuck Jones	Tedd Pierce	Abe Levitow, Richard Thompson & Ken Harris	Bugs Bunny; Nasty Canasta	July 21, 1956	DVD: Golden Collection: Vol. 4 Blu-Ray/DVD: Platinum Collection: Vol. 2
Bugs Bunny finds a giant rock of gold, but Nasty Canasta steals it by pretending to be a bank. Six months later in San Francisco, Bugs is out to get his money back from Canasta, who has used the money to buy a crooked saloon and casino.
776	18	Rocket-Bye Baby	MM	Chuck Jones	Michael Maltese	Ken Harris, Abe Levitow & Ben Washam; Harry Love (effects)	N/A (one-shot cartoon)	August 4, 1956	DVD: Golden Collection: Vol. 6 Blu-Ray/DVD: Platinum Collection: Vol. 2
A baby Martian lands on Earth and switches places with an Earthling that a couple was supposed to get. The father, Joseph Wilbur is embarrassed by his Martian son.
777	19	Half-Fare Hare	MM	Robert McKimson	Tedd Pierce	George Grandpré, Russ Dyson, Keith Darling & Ted Bonnicksen	Bugs Bunny	August 18, 1956	Blu-Ray: Bugs Bunny 80th Anniversary Collection
Bugs Bunny rides on a train to Chattanooga, Tennessee, where he has to fend off against two hungry hobos (modeled after Ralph and Ed from The Honeymooners).
778	20	Raw! Raw! Rooster!	LT	Robert McKimson	Tedd Pierce	Russ Dyson, Ted Bonnicksen, George Grandpré & Keith Darling	Foghorn Leghorn	August 25, 1956	DVD: Golden Collection: Vol. 6
Foghorn Leghorn's cousin, Rhode Island Red, comes to visit, and Foghorn desperately tries to get rid of him.
779	21	The Slap-Hoppy Mouse	MM	Robert McKimson	Tedd Pierce	Ted Bonnicksen, George Grandpré, Keith Darling & Russ Dyson	Hippety Hopper; Sylvester; Sylvester Jr.	September 1, 1956	DVD: Super Stars' Sylvester & Hippety Hopper
Sylvester Jr. tells his father Sylvester that the other cats have called him "soft" for living in a luxurious home. So Sylvester takes Jr. mouse-hunting in a "desirable old run down moue infested house". As they do, Hippety Hopper, whose crate fell off a circus train, somehow stumbles into the basement, and Jr. persuades his father to fight the "giant mouse".
780	22	A Star Is Bored	LT	Friz Freleng	Warren Foster	Arthur Davis, Gerry Chiniquy & Virgil Ross	Bugs Bunny; Daffy Duck; Elmer Fudd; Yosemite Sam	September 15, 1956	DVD: Golden Collection: Vol. 5 DVD: The Essential Daffy Duck; Blu-Ray: Collector's Vault: Vol. 3
Daffy Duck plays a stunt double for Bugs Bunny in various dangerous settings.
781	23	Deduce, You Say!	LT	Chuck Jones	Michael Maltese	Abe Levitow, Richard Thompson, Ken Harris & Ben Washam	Daffy Duck; Porky Pig	September 29, 1956	DVD: Golden Collection: Vol. 1 DVD: The Essential Daffy Duck; Blu-Ray/DVD: Platinum Collection: Vol. 2
After receiving a telegram from the Shropshire Slasher, a notorious criminal, detective Dorlock Homes (Daffy Duck) and his partner Dr. Watkins (Porky Pig) set out to capture him in a local pub he visits.
782	24	Yankee Dood It	MM	Friz Freleng	Warren Foster	Gerry Chiniquy, Virgil Ross & Arthur Davis	Elmer Fudd; Sylvester	October 13, 1956	DVD: Golden Collection: Vol. 6
150 years after the events of fairy tale The Elves and the Shoemaker, Elmer Fudd, the King of Industrial Elves, tries to get some of his elves back from the Shoemaker. There he gives him a lecture on capitalism and mass production. Note: Co-produced by the Sloan Foundation.
783	25	Wideo Wabbit	MM	Robert McKimson	Tedd Pierce	George Grandpré, Ted Bonnicksen, Keith Darling & Russ Dyson	Bugs Bunny; Elmer Fudd	October 27, 1956	DVD: Golden Collection: Vol. 3
Bugs Bunny volunteers for an appearance on a television show hosted by Elmer Fudd. He is unaware that the show is about hunting techniques, and he volunteers to become a hunter's prey.
784	26	There They Go-Go-Go!	LT	Chuck Jones	Michael Maltese	Richard Thompson, Ken Harris, Abe Levitow & Ben Washam; Harry Love (effects)	Wile E. Coyote and the Road Runner	November 10, 1956	DVD: Golden Collection: Vol. 2
And off Wile E. Coyote and the Road Runner go in another series of gags.
785	27	Two Crows from Tacos	MM	Friz Freleng	Tedd Pierce	Virgil Ross & Arthur Davis	Jose and Manuel	November 24, 1956	DVD: Super Stars' Foghorn Leghorn & Friends; Blu-Ray: Collector's Vault: Vol. 1
In Mexico, Jose and Manuel are crows who try to capture a grasshopper.
786	28	The Honey-Mousers	LT	Robert McKimson	Tedd Pierce	Ted Bonnicksen, George Grandpré, Keith Darling & Russ Dyson	Ralph Crumden; Ned Morton; Alice Crumden; Sam Cat	December 8, 1956	DVD: Golden Collection: Vol. 3
A mouse-themed parody of The Honeymooners.
787	29	To Hare Is Human	MM	Chuck Jones	Michael Maltese	Ken Harris, Abe Levitow, Richard Thompson & Ben Washam	Bugs Bunny; Wile E. Coyote	December 15, 1956	DVD: Golden Collection: Vol. 4
Wile E. Coyote tries to use a UNIVAC computer to capture Bugs Bunny.

== 1957 ==
No. overall	No. in year	Title	Series	Directed by	Story by	Animated by	Recurring characters	Original release date	Official DVD/Blu-Ray Availability
788	1	Three Little Bops	LT	Friz Freleng	Warren Foster	Gerry Chiniquy & Bob Matz	N/A (one-shot cartoon)	January 5, 1957	DVD: Golden Collection: Vol. 2 Blu-Ray/DVD: Platinum Collection: Vol. 1
A jazzy retelling of "The Three Little Pigs", where the wolf desperately wants to play in a jazz band with the pigs, but they refuse to let him.
789	2	Tweet Zoo	MM	Friz Freleng	Warren Foster	Arthur Davis, Virgil Ross & Gerry Chiniquy	Tweety; Sylvester	January 12, 1957	N/A
Sylvester attempts to capture Tweety in a city zoo.
790	3	Scrambled Aches	LT	Chuck Jones	Michael Maltese	Abe Levitow, Richard Thompson, Ken Harris & Ben Washam	Wile E. Coyote and the Road Runner	January 26, 1957	DVD: Golden Collection: Vol. 2
Wile E. Coyote and the Road Runner continue their never-ending chase.
791	4	Ali Baba Bunny	MM	Chuck Jones	Michael Maltese	Richard Thompson, Ken Harris, Abe Levitow & Ben Washam; Harry Love (effects)	Bugs Bunny; Daffy Duck	February 9, 1957	DVD: Golden Collection: Vol. 5 DVD: The Essential Daffy Duck; Blu-Ray/DVD: Platinum Collection: Vol. 2
Bugs Bunny and Daffy Duck are heading towards Pismo Beach, California, but somehow arrive instead at the Arabian Desert. They discover a cave with hidden treasure, but they have to outwit its guard. Bugs poses as a jinn to do so. Later, Daffy discovers an actual jinn in an oil lamp. After insulting the jinn, Daffy shrinks to miniature size.
792	5	Go Fly a Kit	LT	Chuck Jones	Michael Maltese	Ken Harris, Abe Levitow & Richard Thompson	N/A (one-shot cartoon)	February 23, 1957	DVD: Golden Collection: Vol. 4
A story of a cat who can fly with his tail falling in love.
793	6	Tweety and the Beanstalk	MM	Friz Freleng	Warren Foster	Virgil Ross, Gerry Chiniquy & Arthur Davis	Tweety; Sylvester	March 10, 1957	DVD: Golden Collection: Vol. 5 DVD: Super Stars' Tweety & Sylvester
A re-telling of "Jack and the Beanstalk" with Sylvester in the role of Jack, and Tweety in the role of the giant.
794	7	Bedevilled Rabbit	MM	Robert McKimson	Tedd Pierce	George Grandpré, Ted Bonnicksen & Keith Darling	Bugs Bunny; Tasmanian Devil	April 13, 1957	DVD: Super Stars' Bugs Bunny (cropped to 16:9 widescreen); Blu-Ray/DVD: Platinum Collection: Vol. 1 (original 4:3 aspect ratio)
The Tasmanian Devil attempts to eat Bugs Bunny in Tasmania.
795	8	Boyhood Daze	MM	Chuck Jones	Michael Maltese	Abe Levitow, Richard Thompson & Ken Harris; Harry Love (effects)	Ralph Phillips	April 20, 1957	DVD: Golden Collection: Vol. 6 (extra, unrestored); Blu-Ray/DVD: Platinum Collection: Vol. 1 (restored)
While awaiting punishment for breaking a window, Ralph Phillips imagines once again in his bedroom.
796	9	Cheese It, the Cat!	LT	Robert McKimson	Tedd Pierce	Ted Bonnicksen, Keith Darling & George Grandpré	Ralph Crumden; Ned Morton; Alice Crumden; Sam Cat	May 4, 1957	DVD: Super Stars' Foghorn Leghorn & Friends
Another mouse-themed parody of The Honeymooners.
797	10	Fox-Terror	MM	Robert McKimson	Michael Maltese	Keith Darling, George Grandpré & Ted Bonnicksen	Foghorn Leghorn; Barnyard Dawg	May 11, 1957	DVD: Super Stars' Foghorn Leghorn & Friends; Blu-Ray: Collector's Vault: Vol. 3
A fox repeatedly tricks Foghorn Leghorn.
798	11	Piker's Peak	LT	Friz Freleng	Warren Foster	Gerry Chiniquy, Arthur Davis & Virgil Ross	Bugs Bunny; Yosemite Sam	May 25, 1957	Blu-Ray: Bugs Bunny 80th Anniversary Collection
Bugs Bunny and Yosemite Sam climb the Schmatterhorn to compete for "50,000 kronkites".
799	12	Steal Wool	LT	Chuck Jones	Michael Maltese	Richard Thompson, Ken Harris & Abe Levitow	Ralph Wolf and Sam Sheepdog	June 8, 1957	DVD: Golden Collection: Vol. 3 Blu-Ray/DVD: Platinum Collection: Vol. 3
Sam Sheepdog once more tries to stop Ralph Wolf from stealing sheep from 9 a.m. to 5 p.m.
800	13	Boston Quackie	LT	Robert McKimson	Tedd Pierce	George Grandpré, Ted Bonnicksen, Keith Darling & Russ Dyson	Daffy Duck; Porky Pig	June 22, 1957	Blu-Ray: Collector's Vault: Vol. 2
Secret agent Boston Quackie (Daffy Duck) has to recover a stolen attaché case to deliver to the Slobovian consulate in West Slobovia.
801	14	What's Opera, Doc?	MM	Chuck Jones	Michael Maltese	Ken Harris, Abe Levitow & Richard Thompson	Bugs Bunny; Elmer Fudd	July 6, 1957	DVD: Golden Collection: Vol. 2 DVD: The Essential Bugs Bunny; Blu-Ray/DVD: Platinum Collection: Vol. 1 Blu-Ray: Bugs Bunny 80th Anniversary Collection
Elmer Fudd chases Bugs Bunny through a parody of Richard Wagner's operas. Note: Added to the National Film Registry in 1992.
802	15	Tabasco Road	LT	Robert McKimson	Tedd Pierce	Ted Bonnicksen & George Grandpré	Speedy Gonzales	July 20, 1957	DVD: Golden Collection: Vol. 4 DVD: Warner Bros. Home Entertainment Academy Awards Animation Collection; Blu-Ray/DVD: Platinum Collection: Vol. 2
Speedy Gonzales has to save his friends Pablo and Fernando from a large hungry alley cat. Note: Nominated for the Academy Award for Best Animated Short Film in 1958.
803	16	Birds Anonymous	MM	Friz Freleng	Warren Foster	Arthur Davis, Virgil Ross & Gerry Chiniquy	Tweety; Sylvester	August 10, 1957	DVD: Golden Collection: Vol. 3 DVD: Warner Bros. Home Entertainment Academy Awards Animation Collection; DVD: Super Stars' Tweety & Sylvester; Blu-Ray/DVD: Platinum Collection: Vol. 3
Sylvester's attempts to eat Tweety are interrupted by an erudite, mild-mannered cat who explains that Sylvester's constant cravings for birds can only lead to self-destruction, and invites Sylvester to a meeting of "Birds Anonymous" ("B.A."), a support group of cats, who have resolved to help one another overcome their bird addictions. Note: Won the Academy Award for Best Animated Short Film in 1958.
804	17	Ducking the Devil	MM	Robert McKimson	Tedd Pierce	George Grandpré & Ted Bonnicksen	Daffy Duck; Tasmanian Devil	August 17, 1957	DVD: Super Stars' Daffy Duck (cropped to 16:9 widescreen); Blu-Ray/DVD: Platinum Collection: Vol. 1 (original 4:3 aspect ratio)
Daffy Duck tries to bring the Tasmanian Devil back to the zoo for a huge monetary award, but only music calms him.
805	18	Bugsy and Mugsy	LT	Friz Freleng	Warren Foster	Virgil Ross, Gerry Chiniquy & Arthur Davis	Bugs Bunny; Rocky and Mugsy	August 31, 1957	Blu-Ray: Bugs Bunny 80th Anniversary Collection
Bugs Bunny discovers that Rocky and Mugsy are hiding out on the floor above him, and plays them off against each other.
806	19	Zoom and Bored	MM	Chuck Jones	Michael Maltese	Abe Levitow, Richard Thompson & Ken Harris	Wile E. Coyote and the Road Runner	September 14, 1957	DVD: Golden Collection: Vol. 2 Blu-Ray: Collector's Vault: Vol. 1
Wile E. Coyote continues to pursue the Road Runner.
807	20	Greedy for Tweety	LT	Friz Freleng	Warren Foster	Gerry Chiniquy, Arthur Davis & Virgil Ross	Tweety; Sylvester; Granny; Hector the Bulldog	September 28, 1957	Blu-Ray: Collector's Choice: Vol. 1
Sylvester, Tweety, and Hector end up in a hospital after chasing each other, being taken care of by nurse Granny.
808	21	Touché and Go	MM	Chuck Jones	Michael Maltese	Richard Thompson, Ken Harris & Abe Levitow	Pepé Le Pew; Penelope Pussycat	October 12, 1957	DVD: Super Stars' Pepé Le Pew
Penelope Pussycat runs under a paint tank and attracts Pepé Le Pew on a beach.
809	22	Show Biz Bugs	LT	Friz Freleng	Warren Foster	Gerry Chiniquy, Arthur Davis & Virgil Ross	Bugs Bunny; Daffy Duck	November 2, 1957	DVD: Golden Collection: Vol. 2 DVD: The Essential Bugs Bunny; Blu-Ray/DVD: Platinum Collection: Vol. 2 Blu-Ray: Bugs Bunny 80th Anniversary Collection
Bugs Bunny and Daffy Duck perform several acts at a vaudeville theater.
810	23	Mouse-Taken Identity	MM	Robert McKimson	Tedd Pierce	George Grandpré & Ted Bonnicksen	Hippety Hopper; Sylvester; Sylvester Jr.	November 16, 1957	Blu-Ray/DVD: Mouse Chronicles (extra, unrestored); DVD: Super Stars' Sylvester & Hippety Hopper (restored)
Hippety Hopper escapes from a city zoo and hops into a nearby museum where Sylvester works at.
811	24	Gonzales' Tamales	LT	Friz Freleng	Warren Foster	Arthur Davis, Virgil Ross & Gerry Chiniquy	Speedy Gonzales; Sylvester	November 30, 1957	DVD: Golden Collection: Vol. 3 Blu-Ray: Collector's Vault: Vol. 1
Sylvester tries to chase Speedy Gonzales out of a Mexican village.
812	25	Rabbit Romeo	MM	Robert McKimson	Michael Maltese	Ted Bonnicksen & George Grandpré	Bugs Bunny; Elmer Fudd	December 14, 1957	DVD: Golden Collection: Vol. 4
Elmer Fudd tries to use Bugs Bunny to get his own female rabbit to mate with him.

== 1958 ==
No. overall	No. in year	Title	Series	Directed by	Story by	Animated by	Recurring characters	Original release date	Official DVD/Blu-Ray Availability
813	1	Don't Axe Me	MM	Robert McKimson	Tedd Pierce	Ted Bonnicksen, George Grandpré & Tom Ray	Daffy Duck; Elmer Fudd; Barnyard Dawg	January 4, 1958	Blu-Ray: Collector's Vault: Vol. 3
When the Barnyard Dawg hears that Elmer Fudd and his wife are planning dinner and need to prepare an animal, Elmer tries to catch Daffy Duck for the meal.
814	2	Tortilla Flaps	LT	Robert McKimson	Tedd Pierce	George Grandpré & Ted Bonnicksen	Speedy Gonzales	January 18, 1958	DVD: Golden Collection: Vol. 4
While Speedy Gonzales is playing ping-pong, a hungry hawk named Señor Vulturo swoops down and tries to eat all of the mice, including Speedy himself.
815	3	Hare-Less Wolf	MM	Friz Freleng	Warren Foster	Gerry Chiniquy, Arthur Davis & Virgil Ross	Bugs Bunny	February 1, 1958	Blu-Ray: Bugs Bunny 80th Anniversary Collection
Charles M. Wolf tries to hunt Bugs Bunny.
816	4	A Pizza Tweety-Pie	LT	Friz Freleng	Warren Foster	Virgil Ross, Gerry Chiniquy & Arthur Davis	Tweety; Sylvester; Granny	February 22, 1958	Blu-Ray: Collector's Vault: Vol. 3
Sylvester tries to capture Tweety in Venice, Italy.
817	5	Robin Hood Daffy	MM	Chuck Jones	Michael Maltese	Abe Levitow, Richard Thompson & Ken Harris	Daffy Duck; Porky Pig	March 8, 1958	DVD: Golden Collection: Vol. 3 DVD: The Essential Daffy Duck; Blu-Ray/DVD: Platinum Collection: Vol. 1
Daffy Duck, in the role of Robin Hood, tries to convince a local friar (Porky Pig) he is really Robin Hood.
818	6	Hare-Way to the Stars	LT	Chuck Jones	Michael Maltese	Richard Thompson, Ken Harris & Abe Levitow; Harry Love (effects)	Bugs Bunny; Marvin the Martian	March 29, 1958	Blu-Ray/DVD: Platinum Collection: Vol. 1
After climbing into a rocket ship from his rabbit hole and meeting Marvin the Martian at a space station, Bugs Bunny steals the Illudium Q-36 Explosive Space Modulator and dodges Marvin's "Instant Martians".
819	7	Whoa, Be-Gone!	MM	Chuck Jones	Michael Maltese	Ken Harris, Abe Levitow & Richard Thompson; Harry Love (effects)	Wile E. Coyote and the Road Runner	April 12, 1958	DVD: Golden Collection: Vol. 2 Blu-Ray: Collector's Vault: Vol. 2
Wile E. Coyote and the Road Runner continue their game of cat and mouse.
820	8	A Waggily Tale	LT	Friz Freleng	Warren Foster	Arthur Davis, Virgil Ross & Gerry Chiniquy	N/A (one-shot cartoon)	April 26, 1958	Blu-Ray: Collector's Vault: Vol. 2
A boy named Junior dreams about being a dog adopted by an unnamed little girl.
821	9	Feather Bluster	MM	Robert McKimson	Tedd Pierce	Ted Bonnicksen, Tom Ray, George Grandpré & Warren Batchelder	Foghorn Leghorn; Barnyard Dawg	May 10, 1958	Blu-Ray: Collector's Vault: Vol. 3
An elderly Foghorn Leghorn and Barnyard Dawg tell their grandchildren stories in this clip show cartoon.
822	10	Now Hare This	LT	Robert McKimson	Tedd Pierce	Tom Ray, George Grandpré, Ted Bonnicksen & Warren Batchelder	Bugs Bunny	May 31, 1958	Blu-Ray: Bugs Bunny 80th Anniversary Collection
Similar to The Windblown Hare, but with different fairy tale cons instead.
823	11	To Itch His Own	MM	Chuck Jones	Michael Maltese	Abe Levitow, Richard Thompson, Ken Harris & Ben Washam	N/A (one-shot cartoon)	June 28, 1958	Blu-Ray: Collector's Vault: Vol. 2
Mighty Angelo, billed as the world's largest flea by an urban circus where he performs, decides to go on vacation and settles on a shaggy pooch who repeatedly gets disturbed by a bulldog named Butcher.
824	12	Dog Tales	LT	Robert McKimson	Tedd Pierce	George Grandpré, Ted Bonnicksen, Warren Batchelder & Tom Ray	Charlie Dog (cameo); Yosemite Sam (cameo)	July 28, 1958	N/A
A "spot gag" cartoon about dogs.
825	13	Knighty Knight Bugs	LT	Friz Freleng	Warren Foster	Virgil Ross, Gerry Chiniquy & Arthur Davis	Bugs Bunny; Yosemite Sam	August 23, 1958	DVD: Golden Collection: Vol. 4 DVD: Warner Bros. Home Entertainment Academy Awards Animation Collection; DVD: The Essential Bugs Bunny; Blu-Ray/DVD: Platinum Collection: Vol. 3 Blu-Ray: Bugs Bunny 80th Anniversary Collection
King Arthur assigns court jester Bugs Bunny a mission to recover the Singing Sword from the Black Knight (Yosemite Sam). Note: Won the Academy Award for Best Animated Short Film in 1959.
826	14	Weasel While You Work	MM	Robert McKimson	Michael Maltese	Warren Batchelder, Tom Ray, George Grandpré & Ted Bonnicksen	Foghorn Leghorn; Barnyard Dawg	September 6, 1958	DVD: Super Stars' Foghorn Leghorn & Friends
Foghorn Leghorn encounters a weasel in the winter.
827	15	A Bird in a Bonnet	MM	Friz Freleng	Warren Foster	Gerry Chiniquy, Arthur Davis & Virgil Ross	Tweety; Sylvester; Granny	September 27, 1958	N/A
Sylvester tries to catch Tweety on a hat that Granny is wearing.
828	16	Hook, Line and Stinker	LT	Chuck Jones	Michael Maltese	Richard Thompson, Ken Harris & Ben Washam	Wile E. Coyote and the Road Runner	October 11, 1958	DVD: Golden Collection: Vol. 6
The familiar chase between Wile E. Coyote and the Road Runner continues.
829	17	Pre-Hysterical Hare	LT	Robert McKimson	Tedd Pierce	Ted Bonnicksen, Warren Batchelder, Tom Ray & George Grandpré	Bugs Bunny; Elmer Fudd	November 1, 1958	Blu-Ray: Collector's Choice: Vol. 3
Elmer Fuddstone attempts to hunt a saber-toothed rabbit.
830	18	Gopher Broke	LT	Robert McKimson	Tedd Pierce	Warren Batchelder, Tom Ray, George Grandpré & Ted Bonnicksen	Goofy Gophers; Barnyard Dawg	November 15, 1958	DVD: Super Stars' Foghorn Leghorn & Friends
The Goofy Gophers attempt to steal vegetables, but have to contend with the Barnyard Dawg.
831	19	Hip Hip-Hurry!	MM	Chuck Jones	Michael Maltese	Ken Harris, Ben Washam, Abe Levitow, Richard Thompson & Keith Darling; Harry Love (effects)	Wile E. Coyote and the Road Runner	December 6, 1958	Blu-Ray: Collector's Choice: Vol. 1
Wile E. Coyote continues his pursuit of the Road Runner.
832	20	Cat Feud	MM	Chuck Jones	Michael Maltese	Ken Harris, Ben Washam, Abe Levitow & Richard Thompson	Claude Cat; Marc Antony and Pussyfoot	December 20, 1958	DVD: Golden Collection: Vol. 4
Marc Antony tries to protect Pussyfoot from Claude Cat, who wants to eat a sausage that Marc offered her.

== 1959 ==
No. overall	No. in year	Title	Series	Directed by	Story by	Animated by	Recurring characters	Original release date	Official DVD/Blu-Ray Availability
833	1	Baton Bunny	LT	Chuck Jones & Abe Levitow	Michael Maltese	Ken Harris, Richard Thompson & Ben Washam	Bugs Bunny	January 10, 1959	DVD: Golden Collection: Vol. 1
Bugs Bunny tries to perform as conductor in an orchestra, but a fly keeps getting in his way.
834	2	Mouse-Placed Kitten	MM	Robert McKimson	Tedd Pierce	Ted Bonnicksen, Warren Batchelder, Tom Ray & George Grandpré	N/A (one-shot cartoon)	January 24, 1959	DVD: Super Stars' Foghorn Leghorn & Friends
A kitten in a sack gets dropped off at the home of Clyde and Matilda Mouse.
835	3	China Jones	LT	Robert McKimson	Tedd Pierce	Tom Ray, George Grandpré, Ted Bonnicksen & Warren Batchelder	Daffy Duck; Porky Pig	February 14, 1959	Blu-Ray: Collector's Choice: Vol. 3
In a spoof of the 1950s TV series China Smith, China Jones (Daffy Duck), an Irish private investigator working in Hong Kong in the Far East, tries to stop Limey Louie with the help of Charlie Chung (Porky Pig).
836	4	Hare-Abian Nights	MM	Ken Harris	Michael Maltese	Ben Washam & Ken Harris	Bugs Bunny; Yosemite Sam	February 28, 1959	Blu-Ray: Bugs Bunny 80th Anniversary Collection
Bugs Bunny recounts his adventures in an Arabian palace, including outsmarting Yosemite Sam as a Sultan.
837	5	Trick or Tweet	MM	Friz Freleng	Warren Foster	Arthur Davis, Virgil Ross & Gerry Chiniquy	Tweety; Sylvester; Sam Cat	March 21, 1959	Blu-Ray: Collector's Vault: Vol. 3
Sylvester and Sam Cat both outwit themselves while trying to capture Tweety.
838	6	The Mouse That Jack Built	MM	Robert McKimson	Tedd Pierce	Ted Bonnicksen, Warren Batchelder, Tom Ray & George Grandpré	N/A (one-shot cartoon)	April 4, 1959	DVD: Golden Collection: Vol. 3
A parody of The Jack Benny Program radio show, featuring the original voice cast of it. The majority of the short has the characters depicted as mice, while the ending features the live-action Jack Benny.
839	7	Apes of Wrath	MM	Friz Freleng	Warren Foster	Arthur Davis, Virgil Ross & Gerry Chiniquy	Bugs Bunny; The Drunk Stork; Daffy Duck (cameo)	April 18, 1959	DVD: Super Stars' Bugs Bunny (cropped to 16:9 widescreen)
Bugs Bunny is kidnapped by the Drunk Stork and given to a gorilla couple as their "baby".
840	8	Hot-Rod and Reel!	LT	Chuck Jones	Michael Maltese	Richard Thompson, Ben Washam & Keith Darling	Wile E. Coyote and the Road Runner	May 9, 1959	Blu-Ray: Collector's Choice: Vol. 1
The never-ending chase between Wile E. Coyote and the Road Runner goes on.
841	9	A Mutt in a Rut	LT	Robert McKimson	Tedd Pierce	George Grandpré, Ted Bonnicksen, Warren Batchelder & Tom Ray	Elmer Fudd	May 23, 1959	DVD: Super Stars' Foghorn Leghorn & Friends
Elmer Fudd's dog become paranoid of him when a TV show deludes him into thinking he's a bad person.
842	10	Backwoods Bunny	MM	Robert McKimson	Tedd Pierce	Warren Batchelder, Tom Ray, George Grandpré & Ted Bonnicksen	Bugs Bunny; Pappy and Elvis	June 13, 1959	Blu-Ray: Bugs Bunny 80th Anniversary Collection
Bugs Bunny confronts a buzzard named Elvis, who plans to capture Bugs, while his father Pappy passively watches.
843	11	Really Scent	MM	Abe Levitow	Michael Maltese	Ken Harris, Richard Thompson & Ben Washam	Pepé Le Pew; Penelope Pussycat	June 27, 1959	DVD: Super Stars' Pepé Le Pew; Blu-Ray: Collector's Vault: Vol. 3
Being born with white stripes on her back, Fabrette the cat falls in love with Pepé Le Pew the skunk in New Orleans, but has to overcome his stink.
844	12	Mexicali Shmoes	LT	Friz Freleng	Warren Foster	Virgil Ross, Gerry Chiniquy & Arthur Davis	Speedy Gonzales; Jose and Manuel; Slowpoke Rodriguez	July 4, 1959	DVD: Golden Collection: Vol. 4 Blu-Ray/DVD: Platinum Collection: Vol. 2
Jose and Manuel are cats who try to catch Speedy Gonzales, and later Speedy's cousin Slowpoke Rodriguez. Note: Nominated for the Academy Award for Best Animated Short Film in 1960.
845	13	Tweet and Lovely	MM	Friz Freleng	Warren Foster	Gerry Chiniquy, Arthur Davis & Virgil Ross	Tweety; Sylvester; Hector the Bulldog	July 18, 1959	Blu-Ray: Collector's Vault: Vol. 1
Tweety outwits Sylvester with the help of Spike the Bulldog.
846	14	Wild and Woolly Hare	LT	Friz Freleng	Warren Foster	Virgil Ross, Gerry Chiniquy & Arthur Davis	Bugs Bunny; Yosemite Sam	August 1, 1959	Blu-Ray: Bugs Bunny 80th Anniversary Collection
Bugs Bunny battles Yosemite Sam in the town of Canasta Flats in 1889.
847	15	Cat's Paw	LT	Robert McKimson	Tedd Pierce	George Grandpré, Ted Bonnicksen, Warren Batchelder & Tom Ray	Sylvester; Sylvester Jr.	August 15, 1959	DVD: Super Stars' Sylvester & Hippety Hopper
Sylvester takes his son Sylvester Jr. up a mountain so that Jr. could earn his Bird Stalking merit badge.
848	16	Here Today, Gone Tamale	LT	Friz Freleng	Warren Foster	Gerry Chiniquy, Arthur Davis & Virgil Ross	Speedy Gonzales; Sylvester	August 29, 1959	DVD: Golden Collection: Vol. 4
Speedy Gonzales tries to retrieve cheese from a ship guarded by Sylvester.
849	17	Bonanza Bunny	MM	Robert McKimson	Tedd Pierce	Tom Ray, George Grandpré, Ted Bonnicksen & Warren Batchelder	Bugs Bunny; Blacque Jacque Shellacque	September 5, 1959	Blu-Ray: Bugs Bunny 80th Anniversary Collection
Bugs Bunny faces off with the French-Canadian claim jumper Blacque Jacque Shellacque during a fictionalized version of the Klondike Gold Rush.
850	18	A Broken Leghorn	LT	Robert McKimson	Warren Foster	Ted Bonnicksen, Warren Batchelder, Tom Ray & George Grandpré	Foghorn Leghorn; Miss Prissy	September 26, 1959	DVD: Golden Collection: Vol. 1 DVD: Super Stars' Foghorn Leghorn & Friends
Foghorn Leghorn attempts to get rid of a rooster chick, but gets outsmarted each time.
851	19	Wild About Hurry	MM	Chuck Jones	Michael Maltese	Ken Harris, Abe Levitow, Richard Thompson, Keith Darling & Ben Washam; Harry Love (effects)	Wile E. Coyote and the Road Runner	October 10, 1959	Blu-Ray: Collector's Vault: Vol. 1
Wile E. Coyote's pursuit of the Road Runner continues.
852	20	A Witch's Tangled Hare	LT	Abe Levitow	Michael Maltese	Richard Thompson, Ken Harris, Ben Washam & Keith Darling	Bugs Bunny; Witch Hazel	October 31, 1959	Blu-Ray/DVD: Platinum Collection: Vol. 1
Witch Hazel pursues Bugs Bunny in a series of plays written by a William Shakespeare-like writer named Sam Crubish.
853	21	Unnatural History	MM	Abe Levitow	Michael Maltese	Ben Washam, Richard Thompson & Keith Darling	N/A (one-shot cartoon)	November 14, 1959	N/A
A "spot gag" cartoon hosted by Professor Beest Lee, featuring animal-related gags.
854	22	Tweet Dreams	LT	Friz Freleng	Friz Freleng & Warren Foster	Gerry Chiniquy, Arthur Davis & Virgil Ross	Tweety; Sylvester; Granny	December 5, 1959	N/A
Sylvester talks to psychiatrist Dr. Milt Towne at the Dog and Cat Clinic in this clip show cartoon.
855	23	People Are Bunny	MM	Robert McKimson	Tedd Pierce	Ted Bonnicksen, Warren Batchelder, Tom Ray & George Grandpré	Bugs Bunny; Daffy Duck	December 19, 1959	DVD: Super Stars' Daffy Duck (cropped to 16:9 widescreen); Blu-Ray: Bugs Bunny 80th Anniversary Collection (original 4:3 aspect ratio)
Daffy Duck watches an episode of "The QTTV Sportsman Hour" in which the host offers $1,000 for the first viewer to bring a rabbit to Station QTTV. Daffy attempts to bring Bugs Bunny to the station, but Bugs outsmarts him.
