= Feline Frame-Up =

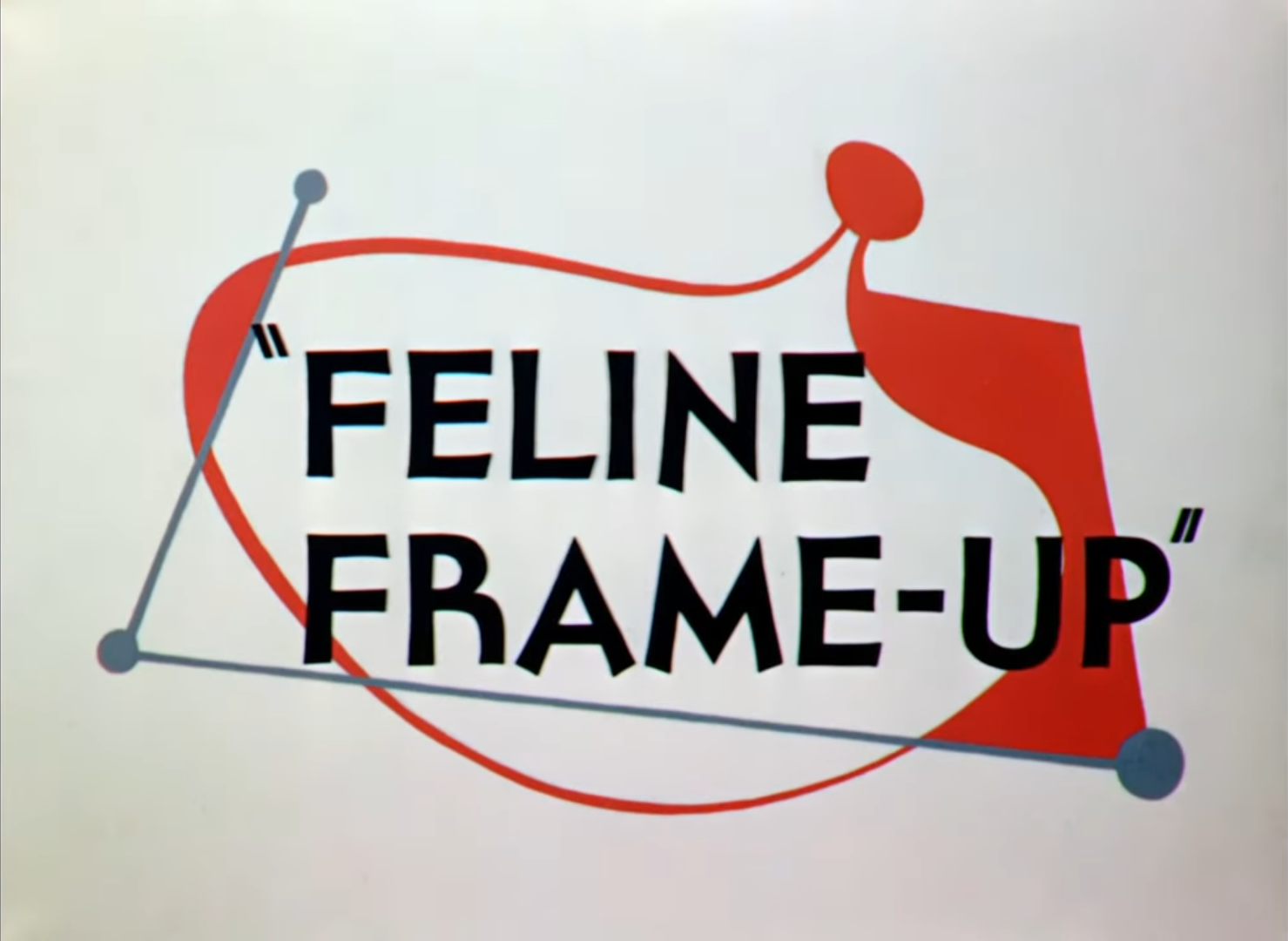
- Title card
- Directed by: Charles M. Jones
- Story by: Michael Maltese
- Starring: Mel Blanc (all other voices); Robert C. Bruce (Man of the House)
- Edited by: Treg Brown
- Music by: Carl Stalling
- Animation by: Abe Levitow; Richard Thompson
- Layouts by: Maurice Noble
- Backgrounds by: Philip DeGuard
- Color process: Technicolor
- Production company: Warner Bros. Cartoons
- Distributed by: Warner Bros. Pictures; The Vitaphone Corporation
- Release date: February 13, 1954 (U.S.)
- Running time: 6:26
- Language: English

Feline Frame-Up is a 1954 Warner Bros. Looney Tunes animated short film directed by Chuck Jones. The cartoon was released on February 13, 1954, and stars Claude Cat, Marc Antony and Pussyfoot.

It features Claude Cat and Marc Antony in a battle of brawn and brains, with the little black-and-white kitten Pussyfoot caught in the middle. This is the third cartoon with Marc Anthony and Pussyfoot (Feed the Kitty and Kiss Me Cat being the previous shorts).

== Plot ==
Screenshot featuring Claude Cat, Pussyfoot and Marc Antony

Pussyfoot is napping on a plush pillow when Claude kicks him off to claim the pillow for himself. Marc Antony attacks Claude in retaliation, throwing him off and returning Pussyfoot to the pillow, and then begins to clobber Claude. Marc Antony is almost immediately caned on the head by Filbert, the animals' stodgy master; having only seen Marc Antony pummeling Claude, Filbert gives Marc Antony a final warning to leave the cats alone.

After this, the conniving Claude schemes to convince Filbert that Marc Antony wants to harm the cats; while Marc Antony is sleeping, he places Pussyfoot in his mouth and yowls to Filbert to make him think Marc Antony is trying to eat Pussyfoot. Claude's scheme is successful, Filbert is tricked, and Marc Antony is thrown out of the house. Claude indulges in his new life without Marc Antony, taunting the dog by openly abusing Pussyfoot in front of him, dropping Pussyfoot in a vase, and mocking Marc Antony.

Though he remains exiled outside, Marc Antony manages to find ways to beat up Claude, either from behind closed doors and/or by getting into the house in crafty manners. While most of his machinations are short-lived and he is rapidly and violently ejected from the house by Filbert, it usually gives him enough time to clobber Claude again before he gets booted out. The multiple thumpings Claude endures over the course of the night eventually elicit the cat's surrender, when he realizes Marc Antony will keep attacking him until he tells the truth. Marc Antony forces Claude to confess to his crimes and is let back into the house and back to the side of his beloved Pussyfoot. A dazed Claude gives Filbert his signed confession, then retrieves Pussyfoot from the vase and places him back in him bed as Marc Antony watches carefully, ready to pummel Claude again if he tries anything to frame him or hurt Pussyfoot once more. Filbert consequently kicks Claude out of the house as punishment for framing Marc Antony and tricking him, landing him in the street, and is promptly run over by a streetcar. Claude sits upright and bemoans "Just one of those days, I guess" before passing out.

== Home media ==
This short is featured on Disc 2 of the Looney Tunes Platinum Collection: Volume 1 DVD and Blu-ray sets.
