= Marcos Antônio =

Marcos Antônio or António is a Brazilian given name which may refer to:

- Marcos Antônio (footballer, born 1979), Brazilian football striker
- Marcos António (footballer, born 1983), Brazilian football defender
- Marcos Antônio (footballer, born 1988), Brazilian football midfielder
- Marcos Antônio (footballer, born 2000), Brazilian football midfielder

== See also ==
- Marco Antonio (disambiguation)
