= Marc Antoine =

Marc Antoine may refer to:

== Personal name ==
- Marc Antoine, French version of Mark Antony (Marcus Antonius, 83–30 BC)
- Marc Antoine (musician) (born 1963), French jazz fusion guitarist
- Marc Antoine (singer) (born 1977), Haitian-Canadian singer

== Given name ==
- Marc-Antoine Charpentier (1643–1704), French composer of the Baroque era
- Marc-Antoine Fortuné (born 1981), French professional footballer
- Marc-Antoine Pouliot (born 1985), Canadian professional ice hockey player
- Marc-Antoine Madeleine Désaugiers (1772–1827), French composer, dramatist and songwriter
- Marc-Antoine Laugier (1713–1769), Jesuit priest and architectural theorist
- Marc-Antoine Parseval (1755–1836), French mathematician
- Marc-Antoine Pellin (born 1987), French basketball player
- Marc Antoine de Beaumont (1763–1830), French nobleman
- Muretus (Marc Antoine Muret, 1526–1585), French humanist and Latin prose stylist of the Renaissance

== See also ==
- Mark Anthony (disambiguation)
- Marcus Antonius (disambiguation)
