= Tuta (footballer, born 1950) =

Brazilian footballer

Personal information
- Full name: João Margarido Rodrigues Alves
- Date of birth: 31 August 1950 (age 76)
- Place of birth: Botucatu, Brazil
- Position: Left winger

Youth career
- Corinthians

Senior career*
Years	Team	Apps	(Gls)
1967–1970	Portuguesa	15	(0)
1970	Corinthians	1	(0)
1971–1980	Ponte Preta	390	(33)
1981	Independente-SP		
1981	Anapolina		
- * Club domestic league appearances and goals as of 18 February 2024

João Margarido Rodrigues Alves (born 31 August 1950), better known as Tuta, is a Brazilian former professional footballer who played as a left winger.

== Career ==
A winger, Tuta was trained in the Corinthians youth ranks, but in 1967, he began his professional career with Portuguesa de Desportos, aged just 17. He made 15 appearances for the club, but without scoring goals. In 1970 he returned to Corinthians but was used in just one game, moving to Ponte Preta, a club for which he played throughout the 1970s, including playing against Corinthians (with Zé Maria) in the historic final of the 1977 Campeonato Paulista. He also played for Independente de Limeira and Anapolina.

== Personal life ==
Tuta is brother of also footballers Zé Maria and Marco Antônio, and uncle of Fernando Lázaro.
