= Mark Anthony (Royal Navy officer) =

Mark Anthony of Carrigcastle (1786 – 1 June 1867) was an officer in the 19th century Royal Navy.

As a 15-year-old, he boarded the Milford packet in Checkpoint in 1801 and, a week later on 14 July, he had joined the Royal Navy as a midshipman on board the sloop HMS Hunter (18 guns) which was then in berth at Portsmouth. He was serving on her when she had 15 men killed in an unsuccessful action off the west coast of Cuba towards the close of 1803. He was then posted to HMS Clorinde.

In September 1804 he joined the frigate HMS Naiad (38 guns) which was present at the Battle of Trafalgar. During this battle, Mark Anthony rescued 56 officers and men of the Achille before she blew up, and assisted in towing the third rate HMS Belleisle from a perilous position near the shoals. He was promoted lieutenant by commission dated 22 April 1808. Later he was appointed Harbour Master of Dunmore East and on 15 October 1835 was made a Freeman of Waterford City.

== Death ==
He died on 1 June 1867 aged 81 and is buried in the (new) Ballylaneen Cemetery. The inscription on his headstone reads:

"Here lies the body of Mark Anthony, Commander R.N Who departed this life on the first of June 1867 aged 81 years He was second son of Joseph and Juliet Anthony of Carrigcastle He served on Board H.M.S Queen Charlotte [sic] at the battle of Trafalgar. And during the years he served in the Royal Navy He had seen and shared in much active service May he rest in peace, Amen"
