= Cat Feud =

1958 film

- Title card
- Directed by: Chuck Jones
- Story by: Michael Maltese
- Starring: Mel Blanc
- Edited by: Treg Brown
- Music by: Milt Franklyn
- Animation by: Abe Levitow; Richard Thompson; Ken Harris; Ben Washam; Harry Love
- Layouts by: Maurice Noble
- Backgrounds by: Philip DeGuard
- Color process: Technicolor
- Production company: Warner Bros. Cartoons
- Distributed by: Warner Bros. Pictures; The Vitaphone Corporation
- Release date: December 20, 1958
- Running time: 5:52
- Language: English

Cat Feud is a 1958 Warner Bros. Merrie Melodies animated short film directed by Chuck Jones featuring Marc Antony and Pussyfoot. It was released on December 20, 1958. The title is a pun on cat food.

== Plot ==
Marc Antony, guarding a construction site, encounters Pussyfoot, a small kitten. Initially wary, Marc Antony softens when he sees Pussyfoot's fearlessness. He offers her a sausage, but they're interrupted by an alley cat wanting the snack. Marc Antony fights to protect Pussyfoot and the sausage. In the end, the cat is defeated, and Marc Antony sings to Pussyfoot as they both fall asleep, relieved and content.

== Home media ==
- DVD – Looney Tunes Golden Collection: Volume 4
