= Marco Antônio (footballer, born 1954) =

Brazilian footballer

Personal information
- Full name: Marco Antônio Rodrigues Alves
- Date of birth: 20 October 1954
- Place of birth: Botucatu, Brazil
- Date of death: 30 November 2021 (aged 67)
- Place of death: Botucatu, Brazil
- Position: Right back

Youth career
- Corinthians

Senior career*
Years	Team	Apps	(Gls)
1970–1976	Corinthians		
1976–1979	Comercial-SP		
1980–1981	Inter de Limeira		
1982	Paysandu		
- * Club domestic league appearances and goals as of 17 February 2024

Marco Antônio Rodrigues Alves (20 October 1954 – 30 November 2021), simply known as Marco Antônio, was a Brazilian professional footballer who played as a right back.

== Career ==
Right back, he started in the youth sectors of Corinthians, a team he played for until 1975, being a reserve player most of the time. He also had spells at Comercial, Inter de Limeira and Paysandu, where he was part of the state champion squad in 1982. He retired after winning.

== Personal life ==
Marco Antônio is brother of also footballers Zé Maria and Tuta, and uncle of Fernando Lázaro.

== Death ==
Marco Antônio died 30 November 2021 at age of 67, in Botucatu, São Paulo.

== Honours ==
Paysandu

- Campeonato Paraense: 1982
