= Marco Antônio =

Marco Antônio may refer to:

- Marco Antônio (footballer, born 1940), born Marco Antônio Garcia Alves, Brazilian football attacking midfielder
- Marco Antônio (footballer, born 1951), born Marco Antônio Feliciano, Brazilian football left-back
- Marco Antônio (footballer, born 1954) (1954–2021), born Marco Antônio Rodrigues Alves, Brazilian football right-back
- Marco Antônio (footballer, born 1963), born Marco Antônio Paes dos Santos, Brazilian football defender
- Marco Antônio (footballer, born 1978), born Marco Antônio de Freitas Filho, Brazilian football forward
- Marco Antônio (footballer, born 1984), born Marco Antônio Miranda Filho, Brazilian football midfielder
- Marco Antonio (footballer, born 1997), born Marco Antônio Rosa Furtado Júnior, Brazilian football midfielder
- Marco Antônio (footballer, born July 2000), born Marco Antônio de Oliveira Coelho, Brazilian football midfielder
- Marco Antônio (footballer, born September 2000), born Marco Antônio da Silva Carvalho, Brazilian football defender/midfielder

== See also ==
- Marcos Antônio (disambiguation)
