= Feed the Kitty =

1952 American animated short film directed by Chuck Jones

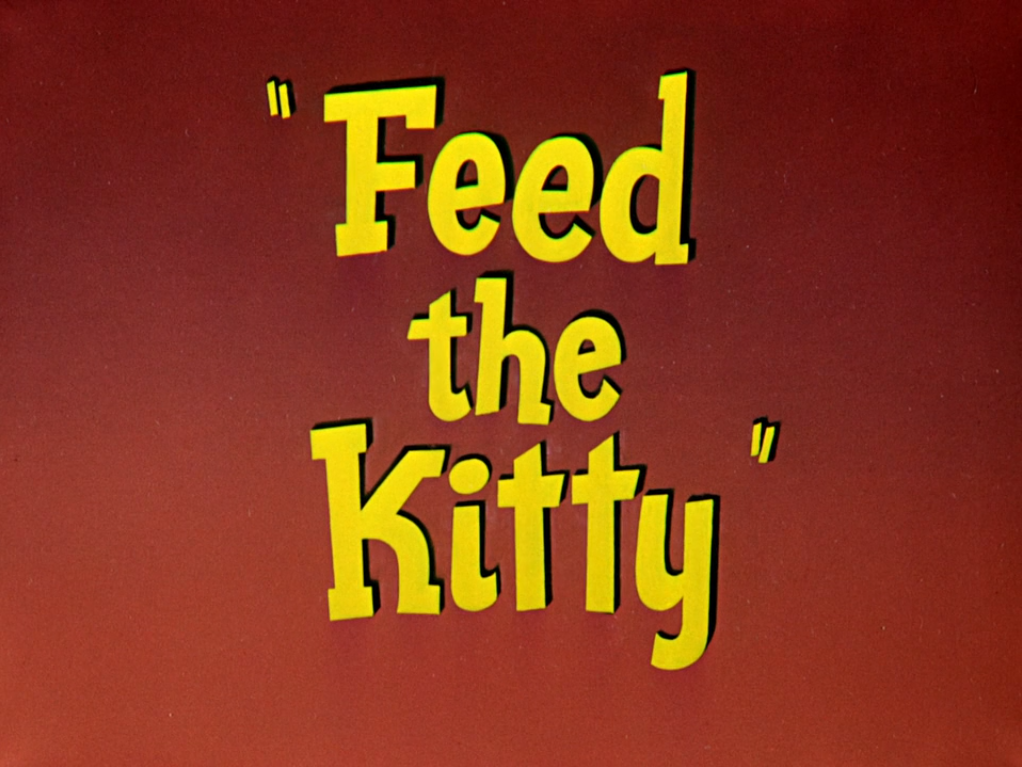
- Title card
- Directed by: Charles M. Jones
- Story by: Michael Maltese
- Starring: Mel Blanc; Bea Benaderet (both uncredited)
- Music by: Carl Stalling
- Animation by: Ken Harris; Phil Monroe; Lloyd Vaughan; Ben Washam; Abe Levitow (uncredited); Richard Thompson (uncredited)
- Layouts by: Robert Gribbroek
- Backgrounds by: Philip DeGuard
- Color process: Technicolor
- Production company: Warner Bros. Cartoons
- Distributed by: Warner Bros. Pictures
- Release date: February 2, 1952
- Running time: 7:22
- Language: English

Feed the Kitty is a 1952 Warner Bros. Merrie Melodies cartoon directed by Chuck Jones and written by Michael Maltese. The cartoon was released on February 2, 1952, and introduces bulldog Marc Antony and kitten Pussyfoot.

In the cartoon, a fierce bulldog adopts an adorable little kitten, and tries to keep it a secret from his owner, who insists that the dog stop bringing things into the house.

In 1994, Feed the Kitty was voted #36 of the 50 Greatest Cartoons of all time by members of the animation field.

== Plot ==
This cartoon is the first of a short series directed by Jones and using the characters of Marc Antony and Pussyfoot (Marc Antony's barks and grunts courtesy of an uncredited Mel Blanc).

Marc Antony, a massive-chested bulldog, tries to intimidate a stray kitten with his ferocious barking and grimacing. Instead of being frightened, he climbs onto the dog's back and falls asleep in his fur. Despite wincing at her kneading, Marc instantly falls for the kitten and decides to adopt him, bringing kitten home with him.

Upon his arrival, his human owner (voiced by Bea Benaderet), tired of picking up his things, orders him not to bring one more thing inside the house. As she reprimands him, Marc discreetly hides the kitten under a bowl. Much of the cartoon centers on the kitten keeping several steps ahead of the dog, continually getting into things around the house. Each time she nearly alerts the dog's owner of her presence, he employs various tactics to hide or disguise him as common household items, including a powder puff, much to his owner's confusion.

After a while, Marc takes the kitten into the kitchen and tries to reprimand him, but quickly forgets his anger when the kitten tries to play with his wagging finger. But when he hears his owner walking toward the kitchen, he hastily hides the kitten in a flour canister and tries to look innocent. Growing tired of his antics, his owner ejects him from the kitchen and tells him to stay out while she bakes cookies. Marc watches as his owner scoops out a cup of flour, and is horrified to see that the kitten is in the measuring cup. The lady pours the flour, along with the kitten, into a mixing bowl and prepares to use an electric mixer. The dog tries several times to thwart or distract her, finally spraying his face with whipped cream to make himself appear rabid. His exasperated owner sees through his disguise and throws him out of the house. Meanwhile, the kitten climbs out of the bowl and hides out of sight to clean himself up.

Marc, unaware that the kitten has escaped, can only watch in horror as his owner mixes the cookie batter, rolls out the dough, cuts it into shapes and places the cookies in the oven. Fearing him dead, Marc becomes increasingly distressed until he finally breaks down. His mistress, thinking he is crying over being disciplined, lets him back inside and tells him he has been punished enough. She attempts to console him by giving him a cookie in the shape of a cat. Stunned, Marc takes the cookie and places it on his back where the kitten had slept earlier as he continues to weep.

The kitten then walks up and meows at him. Marc, immediately overjoyed to see his friend alive, picks the kitten up and kisses him, then suddenly realizes that his owner is watching. He vainly tries to disguise the kitten like he did earlier, but then begs at his mistress's feet. To his surprise, she allows him to keep the kitten, sternly telling him that the kitten is completely his responsibility. At this realization, the dog once again wags his finger at the kitten, but melts as the kitten plays with it and purrs at him. He climbs onto the dog's back and settles in for a nap, and he tucks the kitten in using his fur as a blanket.

== Reception ==
Animation historian David Gerstein writes that Feed the Kitty is "a story that still resonates fifty-odd years on. What is its secret? Not melodrama, for its melodrama isn't entirely unlike that of mushier animated predecessors. Not conscience, for many earlier shorts also meant well. No, Feed the Kitty's secret is its wonderful mixing of these elements with flawlessly timed humor and awesome character designs: Director Chuck Jones' visuals were simply at the peak of their power when they came together with this story, and they make all the difference."

== Home media ==
Feed the Kitty is available on DVD on the Looney Tunes Golden Collection: Volume 1 DVD box set, supplemented with an audio commentary by Greg Ford and a music-only audio track. It is also available as a bonus feature (and was discussed as an example of how Jones used personality in animation) on the DVD release of the PBS documentary entitled Extremes & Inbetweens: A Life In Animation about the life and career of director Chuck Jones. It is also available on the Looney Tunes: Spotlight Collection Volume 1 DVD box set and the Looney Tunes Platinum Collection: Volume 1 Blu-ray box set.

== Other media ==
- The 2001 Disney/Pixar film Monsters, Inc. features a scene that directly references Feed the Kitty, in which Sulley exhibits the same reactions as Marc Antony when he thinks Boo has been crushed in a trash compactor. Doug Sweetland who served as Directing Animator of this film animated this sequence.
- The South Park episode "Coon vs. Coon and Friends" recreates scenes from Feed the Kitty with Cartman acting as Pussyfoot and Cthulhu as Marc Antony in his "cute kitten" routine.

== See also ==
- Looney Tunes
- Looney Tunes and Merrie Melodies filmography (1950–1959)
- Marc Antony and Pussyfoot
