= Marcus Antoninus =

Marcus Antoninus may refer to:

- Marcus Aurelius Antoninus (Marcus Aurelius) (121–180), Roman emperor from 161 to 180
- Marcus Aurelius Commodus Antoninus (Commodus) (161–192), Roman emperor from 180 to 192
- Marcus Aurelius Antoninus (Caracalla) (188–217), Roman emperor from 198 to 217
- Marcus Opellius Antoninus Diadumenianus (Diadumenian) (208–218), Roman emperor in 218
- Marcus Aurelius Antoninus (Elagabalus) (203/4–222), Roman emperor from 218 to 222
