= Marc Antony and Pussyfoot =

Warner Bros. theatrical cartoon characters

Marc Antony & Pussyfoot
- Looney Tunes/Merrie Melodies characters
- From left to right: Claude Cat, Pussyfoot and Marc Antony in Feline Frame-Up (1954)
- First appearance: Marc Antony: Cheese Chasers (1951); Pussyfoot: Feed the Kitty (1952)
- Created by: Chuck Jones
- Voiced by: Marc Antony: Mel Blanc (1952–1958); Noel Blanc (1991); Matt Craig (2017); Fred Tatasciore (2023–present); Pussyfoot: Mel Blanc (1952–1958); Fred Tatasciore (2023); Debi Derryberry (Bugs Bunny Builders Episodes 1-26); Riley King (Bugs Bunny Builders Episodes 30-present)

In-universe information
- Species: Marc Antony: Bulldog; Pussyfoot: Tuxedo cat
- Gender: Marc Antony: Male; Pussyfoot: Female (Male in Feed the Kitty and Kiss Me Cat)
- Nationality: American

Marc Antony and Pussyfoot are animated characters in four Warner Bros. Looney Tunes and Merrie Melodies shorts. Three cartoons focus on the dog and kitten pair: Feed the Kitty (1952), Kiss Me Cat (1953) and Cat Feud (1958). They also appear in one Claude Cat cartoon, Feline Frame-Up (1954).

== Description ==
Marc Antony is a burly bulldog that is usually brown with a tan belly and black ears, though his coloration varies in some shorts. He bears a close resemblance to Hector the Bulldog, but with thinner back legs and minus the outer fangs. Pussyfoot/Cleo, in contrast, is a petite and extremely cute, blue-eyed black-and-white tuxedo cat to whom Marc Antony is utterly devoted with motherly passion. The characters seem to be named as an allusion to Mark Antony and Cleopatra, who were lovers detailed in Plutarch's Parallel Lives. Chuck Jones, the creator, has discussed the efforts to maximize the kitten's sheer adorableness. All head and eyes, the kitten is black, with white fur on the face, belly, and tip of the tail.

== Influence ==
Pussyfoot has appeared in some Warner Bros. merchandising and the pair have been featured in various Warner Bros. productions, such as the third segment of Twilight Zone: The Movie (1983) and a Looney Tunes comic book story called "Bringing Up Baby" that was published in 1999. Tiny Toon Adventures featured a similar character named Barky Marky, who was a comparatively minor character on the show. The pair were also an inspiration for the characters Buttons and Mindy that were featured in the successor to Tiny Toon Adventures, Animaniacs. In the Buttons and Mindy short "Cat on a Hot Steel Beam", the cat that Mindy follows throughout the cartoon is Pussyfoot. Additionally, the kitten makes a very brief cameo appearance in the Chuck Jones short Another Froggy Evening (1995).

Jones would later revisit the idea of a cute kitten having an unlikely protector in the MGM Tom and Jerry short The Unshrinkable Jerry Mouse (1964), with Jerry becoming a kitten's friend and protector against a selfish and jealous Tom (the plot of which was borrowed from Feline Frame-Up (1954)). In Feline Frame-Up, Claude Cat attempts to convince their human owner that Marc Antony wants to harm Pussyfoot.

A segment of Feed the Kitty in which an apparently "inconsolable" Marc Antony believes that Pussyfoot has been turned into a cookie (and unaware that the kitten is actually perfectly safe), was the subject of a homage in the 2001 Pixar film Monsters, Inc. in which Sulley believes that a little human girl he is protecting has fallen into a trash compactor, and reenacts the scene with Marc Antony nearly shot-for-shot.

A reference is also made to Feed the Kitty in the South Park episode "Mysterion Rises" with Eric Cartman acting as Pussyfoot and Cthulhu as Marc Antony in his "cute kitten" routine.

In Archer, the relationship between Archer and his daughter A.J. was inspired by their cartoons according to series creator Adam Reed.

== Alternate names ==
The dog's name is spelled "Marc Antony" in the archived description of Feed the Kitty, although the name appears as "Marc Anthony" on his food dish in the cartoon. Pussyfoot is sometimes called "Kitty" or "Cleo" in some WB animation history books. She was later renamed "Pouncy" for her appearances in Bugs Bunny Builders.

== Appearances ==
=== Classic shorts ===
- Cheese Chasers (1951, Marc Antony only, unnamed)
- Feed the Kitty (1952)
- Kiss Me Cat (1953)
- Feline Frame-Up (1954)
- Cat Feud (1958)

Marc Antony also makes a cameo appearance in No Barking (1954), and Pussyfoot makes one in Another Froggy Evening (1995).

=== Other media ===
Films

- Who Framed Roger Rabbit (Marc Antony cameo only, colored gray)
- Space Jam (as two of the background characters)
- Looney Tunes: Back in Action (cameos at the end)
- Coyote vs. Acme (cameos)
- Tweety's High-Flying Adventure (Pussyfoot only)

Television series

- Animaniacs (Pussyfoot only in "Cat on a Hot Steel Beam")
- Toon Marooned (Marc Antony cameo at "Fowl By Comin' Round the Mountain")
- Parallel Porked (Marc Antony cameo)
- Baby Looney Tunes (Marc Antony cameo as a puppy in the song "Paws and Feathers")
- New Looney Tunes
- Looney Tunes Cartoons (starring in "Boarding Games"; cameo in "Happy Birthday, Bugs Bunny!")
- Bugs Bunny Builders (Pussyfoot only, renamed as "Pouncy")

Video games

- The Bugs Bunny Crazy Castle 2
- Bugs Bunny Crazy Castle 3
