= List of Toon In with Me episodes (2023) =

This is a list of episodes of the American live-action/animated anthology comedy television series Toon In with Me that aired on MeTV in 2023.

== Episodes ==
No. overall	No. in year	Title	Original release date
456	1	"Toast Juice"	January 2, 2023
Bill inadvertently becomes a social media influencer after inventing a new drink recipe. Featured cartoons: Big House Bunny (1950), A Tale of Two Kitties (1942), Spree Lunch (1957), Bone Sweet Bone (1948), Fit to Be Tied (1952)
457	2	"Nostalgiafera2: 2 Vast, 2 Curious"	January 4, 2023
Bill and Toony get a surprise visit from a very old friend. Featured cartoons: Gorilla My Dreams (1948), I Never Changes My Altitude (1937), Goggle Fishing Bear (1949), Sink Pink (1965), Chaser on the Rocks (1965)
458	3	"Change Your Shorts"	January 5, 2023
Bill and Toony watch cartoons that showcase major changes in animation. Featured cartoons: Daffy Doodles (1946), Porky's Badtime Story (1937), Honeymoon Hotel (1934), The Mighty Navy (1941), Tweetie Pie (1947)
459	4	"Fantastic Friday #60"	January 6, 2023
Bill and Toony kick off the first "Fan-Tastic Friday" of 2023 with a special guest appearance from Bill Mumy and classic cartoons featuring Bugs Bunny, Daffy Duck, and Tom and Jerry. Featured cartoons: Knighty Knight Bugs (1958), Droopy's Double Trouble (1951), The Cat Above and the Mouse Below (1964), Two Gophers from Texas (1948), His Bitter Half (1950); Special Guest Appearance: Bill Mumy as himself.
460	5	"Goo, Goo, & More Goo"	January 10, 2023
The "Toon In with Me" studio becomes overrun with mysterious green goo. Featured cartoons: Jumpin' Jupiter (1955), Goo Goo Goliath (1954), Cirrhosis of the Louvre (1966), Popeye, the Ace of Space (1953), Compressed Hare (1961)
461	6	"Mystery Theme!"	January 11, 2023
Toony tries to guess what the Mystery Theme of today's episode is. Featured cartoons: Bugs and Thugs (1954), Pink Pistons (1966), Taxi-Turvy (1954), The Bodyguard (1944), There Auto Be a Law (1953), Thumb Fun (1952)
462	7	"Toony Gives Advice"	January 12, 2023
Toony begins to give out questionable advice to his friends, which Bill is not too happy about. Featured cartoons: Elmer's Candid Camera (1940), Road Runner a Go-Go (1965), The Daffy Doc (1938), The Sneezing Weasel (1938), Cheese Chasers (1951)
463	8	"Fantastic Friday #61"	January 13, 2023
It's another "Fan-Tastic Friday" at the studio. Bill and Toony play cartoons that feature Tom & Jerry, Bugs Bunny, and Yosemite Sam. Featured cartoons: Trap Happy (1946), Pink of the Litter (1967), Snow Excuse (1966), Adventures of Popeye (1935), From Hare to Heir (1960)
464	9	"Furnace Trouble"	January 16, 2023
Bill and Toony are forced to deal with all types of issues when the studio furnace unexpectedly breaks down. Featured cartoons: The Abominable Snow Rabbit (1961), Booby Hatched (1944), Pinknic (1967), Aqua Duck (1963), Out and Out Rout (1966), Hippety Hopper (1949)
465	10	"Ye Olde Toone In with Thee"	January 18, 2023
Bill and Toony take a look at the show that used to film in the studio, long before Toon In with Me. Featured cartoons: Knights Must Fall (1949), One Droopy Knight (1957), The Two Mouseketeers (1952), Pink Valiant (1968), The Scarlet Pumpernickel (1950)
466	11	"Cryptid Club"	January 19, 2023
Bill, Toony, and their friend, Nessie, talk about all things related to cryptids. Featured cartoons: Water, Water Every Hare (1952), Extinct Pink (1969), Eatin' on the Cuff or the Moth Who Came to Dinner (1942), The Night of the Living Duck (1988), Dr. Jerkyl's Hide (1954)
467	12	"Fantastic Friday #62"	January 20, 2023
Bill and Toony are celebrating another "Fan-Tastic Friday". Featured cartoons: Freudy Cat (1964), Kiddin' the Kitten (1952), I'll Be Skiing Ya (1947), Hollywood Capers (1935), What's Opera, Doc? (1957)
468	13	"Boat Envy"	January 23, 2023
Everyone is having boatloads of fun except for Bill and Toony who are stuck in the studio. Featured cartoons: Cats A-Weigh! (1953), Cruise Cat (1952), A Hull of a Mess (1942), Le Bowser Bagger (1967), Go Away Stowaway (1967), Captain Hareblower (1954)
469	14	"The Safety Dans Go Green"	January 24, 2023
Bill and Toony get a visit from the studio's resident safety experts, The Safety Dans. Featured cartoons: Stork Naked (1955), Highway Runnery (1965), The Pink Pill (1968), A Pizza Tweety-Pie (1958), (Blooper) Bunny (1991)
470	15	"Bill Wins 'Best Dressed'"	January 25, 2023
Bill is named one of the best-dressed celebrities of 2023 by a mysterious publication. Featured cartoons: Rhapsody Rabbit (1946), Three Little Bops (1957), Bully for Pink (1965), Napoleon Blown-Aparte (1966), A Bird in a Bonnet (1958), Show Biz Bugs (1957)
471	16	"Australian Toon In with Me"	January 26, 2023
Toony takes a trip down under to take a look at the Australian version of Toon In with Me. Featured cartoons: Pop 'im Pop! (1950), Popeye Meets Rip Van Winkle (1941), The Kangaroo Kid (1938), Ducking the Devil (1957), Operation: Rabbit (1952)
472	17	"Fantastic Friday #63"	January 27, 2023
Bill and Toony are celebrating "Fan-Tastic Friday" with cartoon favorites from Bugs Bunny, Wile E. Coyote and the Road Runner, and Popeye. Featured cartoons: This Is a Life? (1955), Plumbing Is a 'Pipe' (1938), The Screwy Truant (1945), Boston Beanie (1947), Scrambled Aches (1957)
473	18	"Quizzer Wants a Spin-Off"	January 30, 2023
Mr. Quizzer believes he deserves his own spinoff show, so he pitches a few ideas to Bill and Toony. Featured cartoons: Conrad the Sailor (1942), Pest Pilot (1941), Reaux, Reaux, Reaux Your Boat (1966), Sport Chumpions (1941), No Barking (1954)
474	19	"A Cracker Barrel of Laughs"	January 31, 2023
Bill and Toony broadcast from The Cackle Barrel Comedy Club once again. Featured cartoons: Stage Door Cartoon (1944), Matinee Mouse (1966), Puttin on the Act (1940), Pink Panzer (1965), Betty Boop's Ker-Choo (1933), Box-Office Bunny (1991)
475	20	"My Calvin Cupley Runneth Over"	February 1, 2023
Calvin Cupley, the author of the "Cupley's Believe It If You Want" comic strip, makes his return to Toon In with Me. Featured cartoons: The Flying Cat (1952), Nurse to Meet Ya (1955), Porky's Pooch (1941), Barney Bear's Polar Pest (1944), Hare Brush (1955)
476	21	"Selling Something"	February 2, 2023
Toony becomes a high-end real estate agent, inspired by the reality TV shows he has been watching. Featured cartoons: Half-Fare Hare (1956), The House of Tomorrow (1949), The Slap-Hoppy Mouse (1956), Nearlyweds (1957), The Homeless Flea (1940), Clippety Clobbered (1966)
477	22	"Fantastic Friday #64"	February 3, 2023
In another edition of "Fan-Tastic Friday", Bill and Toony take requests and answer mail from viewers. Featured cartoons: The Big Snooze (1946), The Jeep (1938), Stupor Duck (1956), Bugged by a Bee (1969), Feed the Kitty (1952)
478	23	"Toony Toosday!"	February 7, 2023
Bill lets Toony pick cartoons for the day and gets a big surprise. Featured cartoons: Now Hare This (1958), Screwball Squirrel (1944), What's Brewin', Bruin? (1948), Child Psykolojiky (1941), Ah, Sweet Mouse-Story of Life (1965), Rocket Squad (1956)
479	24	"Telethon!"	February 8, 2023
Bill and Toony host a "Toon In with Me" telethon. Featured cartoons: Hare Trimmed (1953), The Big Birdcast (1938), Curtain Razor (1949), Merlin the Magic Mouse (1967), Claws in the Lease (1963)
480	25	"Party, Pizza Party!"	February 9, 2023
Bill and Toony celebrate National Pizza Day. Featured cartoons: Advance and Be Mechanized (1967), Robot Rabbit (1953), Peck Up Your Troubles (1945), Pigs Is Pigs (1937), Lunch with a Punch (1952), Whoa, Be-Gone! (1958)
481	26	"Fantastic Friday #65"	February 10, 2023
Al B. Quirky joins Bill and Toony for a special edition of "Fan-Tastic Friday". Featured cartoons: Canary Row (1950), Bottles (1936), We Did It (1936), Beep Prepared (1961), O-Solar Meow (1967)
482	27	"Do I Smell Love in the Air?"	February 14, 2023
Bill and Toony celebrate Valentine's Day and watch themed cartoons featuring Daffy Duck, Wile E. Coyote and the Road Runner. Featured cartoons: The Stupid Cupid (1944), Don't Look Now (1936), Aloha Hooey (1942), I-Ski Love-Ski You-Ski (1936), Stop! Look! And Hasten! (1954)
483	28	"Ride Along With Bill"	February 15, 2023
Bill and Detective Abouttoretire go on a ride along. Featured cartoons: Baby Buggy Bunny (1954), Dicky Moe (1962), Pink-A-Rella (1969), The Spinach Roadster (1936), Little Boy Boo (1954)
484	29	"Telenovela!"	February 16, 2023
Bill and Toony fill in for the missing stars of a Spanish soap opera called "La Boca de Gritos". Featured cartoons: Hare Splitter (1948), Cartoons Ain't Human (1943), Gem Dandy (1970), No! No! A Thousand Times No!! (1935), Nuts and Volts (1964)
485	30	"Fantastic Friday #66"	February 17, 2023
It's "Fan-Tastic Friday" at the studio, where Bill and Toony take viewer questions and requests. Featured cartoons: Sahara Hare (1955), Plastered in Paris (1966), T.V. of Tomorrow (1953), The Royal Four-Flusher (1947), Attack of the Drones (2004)
486	31	"Harding Har Har"	February 20, 2023
Bill and Toony celebrate President's Day with two guests who battle it out in the ring. Featured cartoons: Dumb Patrol (1964), Hawks and Doves (1968), Dixieland Droopy (1954), Ant Pasted (1953), Daffy Duck and the Dinosaur (1939)
487	32	"In Your Dreams"	February 21, 2023
Toony and Bill participate in a sleep study, and both become trapped in the same exact dream. Featured cartoons: The Great Piggy Bank Robbery (1946), A Dream Walking (1934), The Aristo-Cat (1943), A Waggily Tale (1958), Purr-Chance to Dream (1967)
488	33	"The One Timer Club"	February 23, 2023
Bill and Toony throw a party for friends who have only made one appearance on the show. Featured cartoons: Raw! Raw! Rooster! (1956), Bye, Bye Bluebeard (1949), Pecos Pest (1955), Mouse-Placed Kitten (1959), One Froggy Evening (1955), Hare-Less Wolf (1958)
489	34	"Fantastic Friday #67"	February 24, 2023
Undead consultant Nostalgiaferatoo joins Bill and Toony in this special edition of "Fan-Tastic Friday". Featured cartoons: The Bashful Buzzard (1945), Hic-cup Pup (1954), Duck Dodgers and the Return of the 24½th Century (1980), Popeye the Sailor (1933), Transylvania 6-5000 (1963)
490	35	"Bill Needs His Eyes Checked"	February 28, 2023
Bill gets his eyes dilated and has trouble curating the show, but luckily Toony is there to help him out. Featured cartoons: Feather Dusted (1955), Is There a Doctor in the Mouse? (1964), Rabbit Romeo (1957), The Chump Champ (1950), Daffy Duck in Hollywood (1938)
491	36	"Bored Games"	March 1, 2023
Bill and Toony play an all-new Cleam board game, but quickly realize the rules aren't all that simple. Featured cartoons: Duck! Rabbit, Duck! (1953), Early to Bet (1951), Feather Bluster (1958), Daffy Dilly (1948), Batty Baseball (1944), Run, Run, Sweet Road Runner (1965)
492	37	"Porky Pig's Birthday"	March 2, 2023
Bill and Toony celebrate Porky Pig's birthday by showcasing classic cartoons with the stuttering pig. Featured cartoons: The Prize Pest (1951), I Haven't Got a Hat (1935), Corn on the Cop (1965), Pickled Pink (1965), Duck Dodgers in the 24½th Century (1953)
493	38	"Fantastic Friday #68"	March 3, 2023
In another edition of "Fan-Tastic Friday", Bill and Toony take requests and answer mail from viewers. Featured cartoons: Kitty Foiled (1948), It's Nice to Have a Mouse Around the House (1965), The Pink Quarterback (1968), Glee Worms (1936), The Bowling Alley-Cat (1942)
494	39	"Better Safe Than Sorry"	March 6, 2023
Bill and Toony work with the Safety Dans to develop their own training video. Featured cartoons: What's Up, Doc? (1950), Lost and Foundry (1937), The Pink Tail Fly (1965), Canned Feud (1951), Ready, Set, Zoom! (1955)
495	40	"Fairy Tales"	March 7, 2023
Bill and Toony discuss and show cartoons that feature takes on classic fairy tales. Featured cartoons: Little Red Riding Rabbit (1944), Let's Stalk Spinach (1951), The Trial of Mr. Wolf (1941), A Gander at Mother Goose (1940), Tickled Pink (1968), Bewitched Bunny (1954)
496	41	"Legend of the Survivors of the Impossible Challenge"	March 8, 2023
Bill convinces Toony to audition for a survival reality show. Featured cartoons: Hare-Abian Nights (1959), Zipping Along (1953), Birds of a Father (1961), The Honey-Mousers (1956), Robin Hoodwinked (1958)
497	42	"Top of the Ninth!"	March 9, 2023
Bill explains to Toony why March 9th is one of the most important days of the year. Featured cartoons: Fast Buck Duck (1963), Salt Water Tabby (1947), Hook, Line and Stinker (1958), Popalong Popeye (1952), Dog Gone Modern (1939), Tweet and Lovely (1959)
498	43	"Fantastic Friday #69"	March 10, 2023
On a new special "Fan-Tastic Friday", Bill and Toony features cartoons that either won or were nominated for Academy Awards. Featured cartoons: Johann Mouse (1953), Popeye the Sailor Meets Sindbad the Sailor (1936), The Pink Phink (1964), Mouse and Garden (1960)
499	44	"Glam Rock Toony"	March 13, 2023
Toony rediscovers his love for glam rock music. Featured cartoons: Baton Bunny (1959), Down Beat Bear (1956), Banty Raids (1963), Riot in Rhythm (1950), Midnight Frolics (1938), My Generation G...G... Gap (2004)
500	45	"Toon In with Me 500!"	March 14, 2023
Bill and Toony celebrate the 500th episode of Toon In with Me with a look back at some of the best moments they've shared over the years. Featured cartoons: Rabbit Seasoning (1952), The Pink Blueprint (1966), Popeye's 20th Anniversary (1954), Fish and Slips (1962), Busy Buddies (1956)
501	46	"Thoroughly Enjoyable Thursday"	March 16, 2023
Bill and Toony receive a visit from surprise guest Hugh Spurnak. Featured cartoons: Rabbit Every Monday (1951), Of Thee I Sting (1946), Mouse-Warming (1952), Baby Wants Spinach (1950), Jerry's Cousin (1951)
502	47	"Fan-Tastic St. Patrick's Day"	March 17, 2023
Bill and Toony celebrate two big occasions: Fan-Tastic Friday and St. Patrick's Day. Featured cartoons: The Wearing of the Grin (1951), Count Me Out (1938), Droopy Leprechaun (1958), Don't Axe Me (1958), Much Ado About Mousing (1964)
503	48	"Art of Fish Intelligence"	March 22, 2023
Bill tries to prove to everyone that he can do his job better than artificial intelligence. Featured cartoons: Dr. Devil and Mr. Hare (1964), Daffy Rents (1966), Pierre and Cottage Cheese (1969), Unnatural History (1959), The Mechanical Monsters (1941)
504	49	"Diss List"	March 23, 2023
Bill and Toony are shocked when they read an article ranking all the cast members of Toon In with Me. Featured cartoons: Hollywood Daffy (1946), Let's You and Him Fight (1934), Psychedelic Pink (1968), Carte Blanched (1969), To Beep or Not to Beep (1963)
505	50	"Fantastic Friday #71"	March 24, 2023
In another edition of "Fan-Tastic Friday", Bill and Toony take requests and answer mail from viewers. Featured cartoons: Hawaiian Aye Aye (1964), Naughty but Mice (1939), A Great Big Bunch of You (1932), Hippydrome Tiger (1968), Forward March Hare (1953)
506	51	"Bill Hires a Life Coach"	March 28, 2023
Bill is seeking a life coach and Toon In with Me cast members answer the call. Featured cartoons: Tick Tock Tuckered (1944), Shoein' Hosses (1934), The Gay Anties (1947), Prehistoric Pink (1968), No Parking Hare (1954)
507	52	"Tied Up in Tropes"	March 29, 2023
Bill and Toony explore narrative tropes in classic cartoons. Featured cartoons: Tweety and the Beanstalk (1957), Tot Watchers (1958), Poor Cinderella (1934), Wags to Riches (1949), Bunker Hill Bunny (1950)
508	53	"Tic Tac Toony 4"	March 30, 2023
Bill and Toony play a round of "Tic Tac Toony."; Featured cartoons: Daffy Duck Slept Here (1948), Grin and Share It (1957), Say Cheese, Please (1970), Floor Flusher (1954), Too Hop to Handle (1956)
509	54	"Fantastic Friday #72"	March 31, 2023
Collector's Call host Lisa Whelchel joins Bill and Toony in a special edition of "Fan-Tastic Friday". Featured cartoons: Wild and Woolly Hare (1959), Porky's Bear Facts (1941), Of Fox and Hounds (1940), Zip 'N Snort (1961), The Cat's Me-Ouch! (1965); Special Guest Appearance: Lisa Whelchel as herself.
510	55	"Wally Fyles, T.T.Y.L."	April 4, 2023
Bill and Toony ask a new friend to find the answer to a very important question. Featured cartoons: Southbound Duckling (1955), Cat's Paw (1959), Smile Pretty, Say Pink (1966), The Music Mice-Tro (1967), The Two-Alarm Fire (1934), There They Go-Go-Go! (1956)
511	56	"Let's Go to the Mall"	April 5, 2023
Bill and Toony take a trip to the mall. Featured cartoons: Hare Conditioned (1945), A Bird in a Guilty Cage (1952), Silly Hillbilly (1949), We Give Pink Stamps (1965), Riff Raffy Daffy (1948)
512	57	"Crossword Puzzle"	April 6, 2023
Toony tries not to lose his temper while he helps Bill complete a crossword puzzle. Featured cartoons: Rebel Rabbit (1949), Mouse Menace (1946), Betty Boop and the Little King (1936), Congratulations It's Pink (1967), Pantry Panic (1941), To Duck or Not to Duck (1943)
513	58	"Let's Go to the Movies"	April 11, 2023
Bill and Toony take a trip to their local movie theater to watch cartoons on the big screen. Featured cartoons: Beep, Beep (1952), The Film Fan (1939), Fine Feathered Friend (1942), The Bear That Couldn't Sleep (1939), Little Red Rodent Hood (1952)
514	59	"Slow-Cooking Wives Tales"	April 12, 2023
Bill takes up slow cooking & shares a quick recipe for the ultimate comfort food - meatloaf. Featured cartoons: Trip for Tat (1960), Design for Leaving (1954), Meatless Flyday (1944), Tom Turkey and His Harmonica Humdingers (1940), Little School Mouse (1954)
515	60	"Bond, Boomers and Zoomers"	April 13, 2023
Bill and Toony list their favorite James Bond actors and villains, and Boomers take on Zoomers in "Rival of the Ages."; Featured cartoons: Boston Quackie (1957), Designs on Jerry (1955), The Bear's Tale (1940), Pinkfinger (1965), D' Fightin' Ones (1961)
516	61	"1970's Fashion Trends"	April 14, 2023
Bill & Toony explore the 1970's, from food to the hottest fashion trends. Featured cartoons: The Wild Chase (1965), Mess Production (1945), Filet Meow (1966), Judge for a Day (1935), Homeless Hare (1950)
517	62	"The Spotlight's on Daffy"	April 17, 2023
Bill & Toony celebrate the debut of Daffy Duck with an all-Daffy lineup and special guests Ruth Clampett and Eric Bauza. Featured cartoons: Porky's Duck Hunt (1937), What Makes Daffy Duck (1948), A Star Is Bored (1956), Superior Duck (1996); Special Guest Appearances: Ruth Clampett as herself; Eric Bauza as himself.
518	63	"Eggflation in a Coffee Nation"	April 18, 2023
Toony hits the town & discovers his new favorite morning beverage - coffee. Featured cartoons: One Mother's Family (1939), Sleepy Time Possum (1951), Porky's Cafe (1942), Rabbit's Kin (1952), Busy Bakers (1940)
519	64	"Cereal Truths"	April 19, 2023
Today is all about cereal, cartoons, and the best vintage cereal box toys. Featured cartoons: Pup on a Picnic (1955), Strangled Eggs (1961), A Peck o' Trouble (1953), Olive Oyl and Water Don't Mix (1942), Stop That Noise (1935)
520	65	"First Things First"	April 20, 2023
Six new cartoons make their Toon In with Me debut. Featured cartoons: Bushy Hare (1950), Tweety's S.O.S. (1951), Touché and Go (1957), Slap-Happy Pappy (1940), Dog Daze (1937), The Henpecked Duck (1941)
521	66	"Tree H-u-g-g-i-n-g"	April 21, 2023
Bill & Toony do their part to celebrate Earth Day by picking up, planting a tree, and paying homage to our National Parks. Featured cartoons: Fresh Fish (1939), Red Hot Rangers (1947), Flowers for Madame (1935), Cross Country Detours (1940)
522	67	"Old Dog, New Tricks"	April 25, 2023
Bill tries out new things like being a stuntman and different forms of coffee. Featured cartoons: Surf-Bored Cat (1967), Doing Impossikible Stunts (1940), What's Cookin' Doc? (1944), Rover's Rival (1937), The Mad Hatter (1940)
523	68	"Bill the Sock Star"	April 26, 2023
Bill and Toony talk sock fashion and reminisce about toys of the past. Featured cartoons: Sock a Doodle Do (1952), Sniffles Bells the Cat (1941), Pink Posies (1967), Porky's Spring Planting (1938), The Jet Cage (1962)
524	69	"In Celebration of Libraries"	April 27, 2023
Bill and Toony host their first book club discussion; Jump Jefferson celebrates April 27 birthdays; and Bill recites a poem on Poem in Your Pocket Day. Featured cartoons: Knight-mare Hare (1955), The Lyin' Mouse (1937), Novelty Shop (1936), Making Friends (1936), Fox-Terror (1957)
525	70	"A Better Bill"	April 28, 2023
Bill is on a journey of self-improvement. Featured cartoons: That's My Mommy (1955), The Marry-Go-Round (1943), The Hare-Brained Hypnotist (1942), House Cleaning Blues (1937), The Chocolate Chase (1980)
526	71	"Decades of Fun"	May 1, 2023
Bill and Toony take us on a trip through the decades while sharing some of your favorite cartoons. Featured cartoons: Home, Tweet Home (1950), Moby Duck (1965), Rabbit Stew and Rabbits Too! (1969), Spaced Out Bunny (1980), Carrotblanca (1995)
527	72	"World Tuna Day"	May 2, 2023
Bill is pulling out all the stops on World Tuna Day with surprises along the way for Toony. Featured cartoons: Believe It or Else (1939), Fish Tales (1936), Weight for Me (1961), Fiesta Fiasco (1967), Cheese It, the Cat! (1957)
528	73	"Best. Year. Ever"	May 3, 2023
Bill and Toony reminisce on the best years ever for baseball, movies, and more. Plus Teddy Roosevelt decides which year of his presidency was the best. Featured cartoons: Mucho Locos (1966), Boulevardier from the Bronx (1936), The Night of the Living Duck (1988), Happy You and Merry Me (1936), Sugar and Spies (1966)
529	74	"Visions of Summer"	May 4, 2023
Toony and Bill are making vision boards for their dream summer. Featured cartoons: Bon Bon Parade (1935), I Wanna Be a Life Guard (1936), Barbecue Brawl (1956), Mr. and Mrs. Is the Name (1935), Barney's Hungry Cousin (1953)
530	75	"You Pick the Toons"	May 5, 2023
Bill and Toony show cartoons that have been requested by the viewers. Featured cartoons: Hare-Way to the Stars (1958), It's Hummer Time (1950), Pecos Pest (1955), The Miller's Daughter (1934), Fin'n Catty (1943), The Unmentionables (1963)
531	76	"The Hot Seat"	May 8, 2023
Bill and Toony read the Weekday Funnies, Jump Jefferson interviews Bill in the Actual Humans Hot Seat, and a new Super Tooner is crowned. Featured cartoons: Daffy Duck Hunt (1949), Tweetie Pie (1947), The Mice Will Play (1938), Me Musical Nephews (1942), Pet Peeve (1954)
532	77	"Best of Baseball"	May 9, 2023
With baseball season in full swing, Toony and Bill talk about all the thrills at a baseball game (including the food). Featured cartoons: Porky's Baseball Broadcast (1940), Speedy Gonzales (1955), A Pizza Tweety-Pie (1958), The Twisker Pitcher (1937), Aqua Duck (1963)
533	78	"Video Game Fever!"	May 10, 2023
Bill takes Toony on a journey through the history of video games. Featured cartoons: Duel Personality (1966), A Balmy Swami (1949), Haredevil Hare (1948), Road to Andalay (1964), From Hare to Eternity (1997)
534	79	"Camp Watchingtoon"	May 11, 2023
Bill and Toony set up a campsite in the studio, complete with a tent, s'mores, sleeping bags, a guitar, and a bonfire. Featured cartoons: My Favorite Duck (1942), The Fly's Last Flight (1949), Bah Wilderness (1943), Joe Glow, the Firefly (1941), The Missing Mouse (1953)
535	80	"Bucket List"	May 12, 2023
Bill and Toony embark on an adventure in order to check travel destinations off Bill's bucket list. Featured cartoons: Just Plane Beep (1965), Shamrock and Roll (1969), Young and Healthy (1933), Bully for Bugs (1953), Little Dutch Plate (1935)
536	81	"Puttin' the Cool in School"	May 16, 2023
Bill and Toony visit Bill's old elementary school and reminisce about the best parts of the school day. Featured cartoons: The Turn-Tale Wolf (1952), Yankee Doodle Bugs (1954), The Bug Parade (1941), I Wanna Play House (1936), Katnip Kollege (1938)
537	82	"Summer Travel"	May 18, 2023
Bill and Toony decide where to road trip this summer with the help of The Travel Mom. Featured cartoons: Yankee Doodle Daffy (1943), Vacation with Play (1951), Aviation Vacation (1941), Down and Outing (1961), The Dixie Fryer (1960)
538	83	"You Pick the Toons 2"	May 19, 2023
Bill and Toony show cartoons that have been requested by viewers. Featured cartoons: Bunny Hugged (1951), Car of Tomorrow (1951), Goldilocks and the Three Bears (1939), Fit to Be Tied (1952), A Hound for Trouble (1951)
539	84	"Rival of the Ages II"	May 22, 2023
Four generations face off in the second edition of Rival of the Ages. Featured cartoons: Deduce, You Say! (1956), Bone Sweet Bone (1948), Barbary Coast Bunny (1956), Brotherly Love (1936), Bad Day at Cat Rock (1965)
540	85	"A Fishy Deal"	May 23, 2023
Toony decides he's going to run for MeTV Employee of the Month, and Bill helps him launch his campaign. Featured cartoons: Ballot Box Bunny (1951), The Candid Candidate (1937), Popeye for President (1956), Steal Wool (1957), You Were Never Duckier (1948)
541	86	"Summer of '77 Was Heaven"	May 24, 2023
Bill and Toony reminisce on the summer of 1977 from the release of Star Wars to Bubblicious bubble gum. Featured cartoons: Martian Through Georgia (1962), Duck Dodgers in the 24½th Century (1953), To Itch His Own (1958), Nurse to Meet Ya (1955), Devil May Hare (1954)
542	87	"Peace, Love and Toons"	May 25, 2023
Bill and Toony get groovy with the 60s from fashion trends to the hottest toys. Featured cartoons: Lighter Than Hare (1960), The Tom and Jerry Cartoon Kit (1962), War and Pieces (1964), Norman Normal (1968), Well Worn Daffy (1965)
543	88	"Sweatin' to the Toonies"	May 30, 2023
Toony helps Bill get into shape as he works on his fitness routine. Featured cartoons: Tortoise Beats Hare (1941), Vim, Vigor and Vitaliky (1936), Muscle Beach Tom (1956), Betty Boop and Little Jimmy (1936), Rabbit Punch (1948)
544	89	"Toony's Time Machine"	May 31, 2023
Bill and Toony are transported back in time on a toy hunting adventure. Featured cartoons: See Ya Later Gladiator (1968), Chariots of Fur (1994), Popeye, the Ace of Space (1953), Portrait of the Artist as a Young Bunny (1980), Springtime for Thomas (1946)
545	90	"It's Magic!"	June 1, 2023
Bill and Toony explore the history of magic, and magician Benjamin Barnes performs. Featured cartoons: Hot Cross Bunny (1948), Merlin the Magic Mouse (1967), Of Feline Bondage (1965), Prest-O Change-O (1939), I Was a Teenage Thumb (1963)
546	91	"Summer Blockbuster Showdown"	June 2, 2023
Bill and Toony track the history of the summer blockbuster through the films of Steven Spielberg and George Lucas. Featured cartoons: Box-Office Bunny (1991), Sandy Claws (1955), Tired and Feathered (1965), Guided Mouse-ille (1967), Wild Wild World (1960)
547	92	"Soda So Good"	June 5, 2023
Bill and Toony talk all things cola, Quizzer gives Bill a POP quiz, and Bill shows us his two-ingredient cupcakes. Featured cartoons: The Unruly Hare (1945), Dr. Jerkyl's Hide (1954), Chaser on the Rocks (1965), High Steaks (1962), The Cat's Bah (1954)
548	93	"Summer Carnival"	June 6, 2023
Bill and Toony take a trip to the carnival to go on rides, play games, and eat carnival food. Featured cartoons: Satan's Waitin' (1954), Curious Puppy (1939), Quick on the Vigor (1950), The Horse on the Merry-Go-Round (1938), Daredevil Droopy (1951)
549	94	"Flea Market Flippin'"	June 7, 2023
Darrell Sheets from A&E's Storage Wars weighs in on Bill's flea market finds and Bill shares some helpful lifehacks. Featured cartoons: Chili Corn Corny (1965), Rushing Roulette (1965), A Scent of the Matterhorn (1961), Peep in the Deep (1946), Hare and Loathing in Las Vegas (2004)
550	95	"Will it Gel?"	June 8, 2023
Bill reminisces with Toony about gelatin desserts. Featured cartoons: The Little Orphan (1949), A Cat, a Mouse and a Bell (1935), Daffy's Diner (1967), The Football Toucher Downer (1937), Bugs' Bonnets (1956)
551	96	"Hot Day, Cold Treats"	June 9, 2023
Bill and Toony indulge in the cool tastes of summer. Featured cartoons: Mice Follies (1954), Beaus Will Be Beaus (1955), The Blow Out (1936), Dixieland Droopy (1954), Sport Chumpions (1941)
552	97	"Gee, TV"	June 12, 2023
Bill takes Toony through the history of television technology. Featured cartoons: Cellbound (1955), I Never Changes My Altitude (1937), T.V. of Tomorrow (1953), The Bear That Wasn't (1967), Zip Zip Hooray! (1965)
553	98	"Perfect Pairings"	June 13, 2023
Bill and Toony discuss the origins of classic pairings like jeans and a t-shirt and milk and cookies. Featured cartoons: A Street Cat Named Sylvester (1953), What-- No Spinach? (1936), Football Bugs (1936), Cat-Tails for Two (1953), Daffy Doodles (1946)
554	99	"A Trip on Route 66"	June 14, 2023
Bill and Toony take a trip down Route 66 to marvel at roadside attractions and learn the history of the route. Featured cartoons: Get Rich Quick Porky (1937), Wet Hare (1962), Service with a Guile (1946), Billboard Frolics (1935), Zoom and Bored (1957)
555	100	"Summer Concerts"	June 15, 2023
Bill takes Toony to an outdoor concert. They remember iconic moments from past festivals and make a rocking trail mix. Featured cartoons: A Corny Concerto (1943), Concerto In B Flat Minor (1942), Cool Cat (1967), Bartholomew Versus the Wheel (1964), Long-Haired Hare (1949)
556	101	"Amazing Grease"	June 16, 2023
Bill goes greaser as he remembers the rock 'n' roll revival of the 1970s. Featured cartoons: The High and the Flighty (1956), Scat Cats (1957), One Cab's Family (1952), Guided Muscle (1955), Muzzle Tough (1954)
557	102	"To the Drive-In!"	June 20, 2023
Bill and Toony head to the drive-in to catch some toons. Featured cartoons: Ain't She Tweet (1952), Streamlined Greta Green (1937), Firemen's Brawl (1953), Training Pigeons (1936), The Hollywood Bowl (1950)
558	103	"Summer of '63"	June 21, 2023
Toony helps Bill relive the awesome Summer of '63, from its surf craze to food inventions. Featured cartoons: Hare-Breadth Hurry (1963), Pent-House Mouse (1963), Mexican Cat Dance (1963), Now Hear This (1963), The Million Hare (1963)
559	104	"Generation Gap"	June 22, 2023
Bill and Toony explore just how wide the generation gap really is. Featured cartoons: My Generation G...G... Gap (2004), On With the New (1938), Tom and Chérie (1955), A Broken Leghorn (1959), Baby Bottleneck (1946)
560	105	"All a Board Game"	June 23, 2023
It's time to roll the dice, as Bill and Toony look back at classic board games. Featured cartoons: My Bunny Lies over the Sea (1948), Alona on the Sarong Seas (1942), What Price Fleadom (1948), My Friend the Monkey (1939), Skyscraper Caper (1968)
561	106	"Summer Schoolin"	June 26, 2023
Bill shares cool tips, tricks and hacks he's learned online. Featured cartoons: Speedy Ghost to Town (1967), Go Fly a Kit (1957), Too Weak to Work (1943), Pests for Guests (1955), Soup or Sonic (1980)
562	107	"Clownin' Around"	June 27, 2023
Toony contemplates a career change as a circus performer. Featured cartoons: Big Top Bunny (1951), The Flea Circus (1954), The Man on the Flying Trapeze (1934), 3 Ring Wing-Ding (1968), Tweety's Circus (1955)
563	108	"You Fad to Be There"	June 28, 2023
Bill tries to revive wild but utterly real fads from the 20th century. Featured cartoons: Pappy's Puppy (1955), Dance of the Weed (1941), Problem Pappy (1941), Jerry and the Goldfish (1951), Gone Batty (1954)
564	109	"In the Nick of Time"	June 29, 2023
Summer is in full swing for Bill and Toony who figure out affordable summer trips and head to the grill for an easy summer recipe. Featured cartoons: People Are Bunny (1959), Room and Bird (1951), Miss Glory (1936), Porky's Hotel (1939), Going! Going! Gosh! (1952)
565	110	"Treasure"	June 30, 2023
Bill and Toony meet a real life treasure hunter. Featured cartoons: Buccaneer Bunny (1948), Popeye and the Pirates (1947), The Phantom Ship (1936), Ali Baba Bunny (1957), Tease for Two (1965)
566	111	"Which Tooner Gets the Toon?"	July 3, 2023
Tooners go head-to-head with viewer cartoon requests. Featured cartoons: Rabbit Rampage (1955), Sorry Safari (1962), The Impatient Patient (1942), Señor Droopy (1949), Three Little Bops (1957)
567	112	"The Power of Scent"	July 5, 2023
Bill and Toony explore nostalgic scents. Featured cartoons: Awful Orphan (1949), A Tale of Two Mice (1945), Pleased to Meet Cha! (1935), Louvre Come Back to Me! (1962), Upswept Hare (1953)
568	113	"Rockin' Rockers"	July 6, 2023
Bill straps on skates to boogie through the history of roller rinks. Featured cartoons: Beep Prepared (1961), The Flying Cat (1952), A Date to Skate (1938), Bear Feat (1949), Bugsy and Mugsy (1957)
569	114	"Pinball Wizard"	July 7, 2023
Bill and Toony head back to the arcade to celebrate the game of pinball. Featured cartoons: A Ham in a Role (1949), O-Solar Meow (1967), Nell's Yells (1939), Dangerous Dan McFoo (1939), The Grey Hounded Hare (1949)
570	115	"Bunch O Buttons"	July 10, 2023
Bill and Toony explore amazing collections. Featured cartoons: Puss 'n' Boats (1966), Moving Aweigh (1944), The Egg Collector (1940), A Little Soap and Water (1935), Cracked Quack (1952)
571	116	"Party Like It's 1983"	July 11, 2023
Bill and Toony take a look back at the year 1983. Featured cartoons: Prince Violent (1961), The EGGcited Rooster (1952), Popeye Meets Rip Van Winkle (1941), Goo Goo Goliath (1954), Forward March Hare (1953)
572	117	"When Life Gives You Lemons"	July 12, 2023
Toony has a lemonade stand and learns a few lessons on the way. Featured cartoons: Hairied and Hurried (1965), Fool Coverage (1952), The Cat Came Back (1936), Be Human (1936), False Hare (1964)
573	118	"Camp Watchingtoon II"	July 13, 2023
Bill slips on his old coonskin cap and heads to his old summer camp for more outdoor fun. Featured cartoons: Roman Legion-Hare (1955), Porky and Gabby (1937), Lumberjack and Jill (1949), Crockett-Doodle-Do (1960), Wabbit Twouble (1941)
574	119	"Popeye's 90th Anniversary!"	July 14, 2023
Toony and Bill celebrate the 90th Anniversary of Popeye. Featured cartoons: Popeye the Sailor (1933), Let's Get Movin' (1936), Never Kick a Woman (1936), Let's Stalk Spinach (1951), The Mighty Navy (1941)
575	120	"TV Dinners"	July 18, 2023
Bill and Toony discuss the history of TV Dinners. Featured cartoons: Devil's Feud Cake (1963), Zoom at the Top (1962), Females is Fickle (1940), Along Came Daffy (1947), Dog Pounded (1954)
576	121	"Tom & Jerry Award Winners"	July 19, 2023
A full hour of Academy Award-winning Tom & Jerry shorts. Featured cartoons: Mouse Trouble (1944), Quiet Please! (1945), The Cat Concerto (1947), The Two Mouseketeers (1952), Johann Mouse (1953)
577	122	"Amazing Pets"	July 20, 2023
Toony takes over and surprises Bill with some of his talented pals. Featured cartoons: Mouse for Sale (1955), Dough for the Do-Do (1949), Much Ado About Nutting (1953), This is a Life? (1955), Birds Anonymous (1957)
578	123	"Junk Food"	July 21, 2023
Toony leads in celebrating a holiday close to his heart, and stomach, National Junk Food Day. Featured cartoons: Bewitched Bunny (1954), Porky's Pastry Pirates (1942), A Hick, a Slick and a Chick (1948), Betty in Blunderland (1934), Cats and Bruises (1965)
579	124	"Behind the Toons"	July 24, 2023
Bill teaches Toony how classic cartoons were made. Featured cartoons: The Tom and Jerry Cartoon Kit (1962), A Cartoonist's Nightmare (1935), Duck Amuck (1953), Scrambled Aches (1957), Bad Ol' Putty Tat (1949)
580	125	"Donut Adventure"	July 26, 2023
Toony gets a part-time summer job working at a donut shop. Featured cartoons: The Egg and Jerry (1956), Pied Piper Porky (1939), Ready, Woolen and Able (1960), Beach Peach (1950), Kiss Me Cat (1953)
581	126	"Stretching a Buck"	July 27, 2023
Bill and Toony learn tips and tricks to help them save more money without compromising on the fun. Featured cartoons: The Stupor Salesman (1948), A Job for a Gob (1955), What Price Porky (1938), Bill of Hare (1962), At Your Service Madame (1936)
582	127	"Old Hollywood"	July 28, 2023
Bill and Toony explore the many genres of Old Hollywood. Featured cartoons: Rodent to Stardom (1967), A Hollywood Detour (1942), Posse Cat (1954), The Super Snooper (1952), Slick Hare (1947)
583	128	"Bill Faces a Pro Wrestler"	July 31, 2023
All Elite Wrestling′s Hollywood Hunk, Ryan Nemeth, makes a surprise appearance. Featured cartoons: Jerry's Cousin (1951), Porky the Wrestler (1937), Mad as a Mars Hare (1963), Morning, Noon and Night Club (1937), Bunny Hugged (1951)
584	129	"Amateur Orinthologists"	August 1, 2023
Bill and Toony go on a bird-watching adventure. Featured cartoons: Birth of a Notion (1947), Zipping Along (1953), Bluebirds Baby (1938), Pettin' in the Park (1934), All a Bir-r-r-d (1950)
585	130	"Location Fascination"	August 2, 2023
Bill and Toony take a trip to the Southwest to visit iconic cartoon settings. Featured cartoons: Bully for Bugs (1953), Gee Whiz-z-z-z-z-z-z (1956), Tar With A Star (1949), All Fowled Up (1955), Salt Water Tabby (1947)
586	131	"Good Things Come in '73"	August 3, 2023
Bill and Toony revisit the year, 1973. Featured cartoons: One Froggy Evening (1955), Out and Out Rout (1966), Duck Soup to Nuts (1944), Barney's Hungry Cousin (1953), Stupor Duck (1956)
587	132	"A Lunch to the Gut"	August 4, 2023
Bill and Toony look back on the history of lunch and even conduct a retro taste test. Featured cartoons: Little School Mouse (1954), The Screwy Truant (1945), Bugs Bunny and the Three Bears (1944), Lunch with a Punch (1952), Don't Give Up the Sheep (1953)
588	133	"Weekend Excursion"	August 7, 2023
Bill and Toony take a weekend trip to the Chicago Botanic Garden. Featured cartoons: Tick Tock Tuckered (1944), Sniffles Takes a Trip (1940), Honeyland (1935), By Word of Mouse (1954)
589	134	"Quizzer on the Street"	August 9, 2023
Time Capsule Trivia hits the road with Mr. Quizzer on the street. Featured cartoons: An Egg Scramble (1950), The Astroduck (1966), Goldimouse and the Three Cats (1960), A Clean Shaven Man (1936), Acrobatty Bunny (1946)
590	135	"All's Fair at the Ren Faire"	August 10, 2023
Bill and Toony take a step back in time to the Renaissance era. Featured cartoons: Knight-mare Hare (1955), Betty Boop and the Little King (1936), One Droopy Knight (1957), A Witch's Tangled Hare (1959), Touché, Pussy Cat! (1954)
591	136	"Which Tooner Gets the Toon II"	August 11, 2023
Tooners go head-to-head with viewer cartoon requests in the 2nd edition of "Which Tooner Gets the Toon."; Featured cartoons: Drip-Along Daffy (1951), Stop! Look! And Hasten! (1954), Ding Dog Daddy (1942), How Green Is My Spinach (1950), High Diving Hare (1949)
592	137	"Toony Flips for Coins"	August 14, 2023
A professional coin dealer shows Bill and Toony the value of change. Pocket change, that is. Featured cartoons: Golden Yeggs (1950), Customers Wanted (1939), Honey's Money (1962), Heir Bear (1953), The Million Dollar Cat (1944)
593	138	"Hodgepodge of Fun!"	August 15, 2023
An hour of fun, games and cake. Featured cartoons: Paying the Piper (1949), Good Night Elmer (1940), Pudgy Picks a Fight! (1937), The Mouse-Merized Cat (1946), The Unshrinkable Jerry Mouse (1964)
594	139	"Toony's Quest for the Best"	August 16, 2023
Toony starts a vlog on his quest for the best. Featured cartoons: The Scarlet Pumpernickel (1950), Northwest Hounded Police (1946), Bad Luck Blackie (1949), What's Opera, Doc? (1957), Red Hot Riding Hood (1943)
595	140	"53 and Me"	August 17, 2023
Bill shows Toony all the great candy, culture and cars from the year 1953. Featured cartoons: Muscle Tussle (1953), Catty Cornered (1953), There Auto Be a Law (1953), Baby Wants a Battle (1953), That's My Pup! (1953)
596	141	"Hi, School!"	August 18, 2023
Bill's high school locker is finally opened after 40 years. Wait until you see what's inside. Featured cartoons: Professor Tom (1948), Kiddin' the Kitten (1952), The Chewin' Bruin (1940), Baseball Bugs (1946), Road Runner a Go-Go (1965)
597	142	"Classic Rivalries"	August 22, 2023
Bill and Toony reminisce about some of the most famous rivalries in classic cartoons and pop culture history. Featured cartoons: Fast and Furry-ous (1949), Naughty Neighbors (1939), Swimmer Take All (1952), The Bowling Alley-Cat (1942), The Fair-Haired Hare (1951)
598	143	"Cowboy Bill"	August 23, 2023
Saddle up! Bill dresses like a buckaroo and reminisces about the Western craze of the 1950s and '60s. Featured cartoons: Oily Hare (1952), Me Feelins is Hurt (1940), Egghead Rides Again (1937), The First Bad Man (1955), Wild and Woolly Hare (1959)
599	144	"Urban Legends: Debunked!"	August 25, 2023
Bill and Toony investigate myths like cow tipping and drink cola with popping candy. Featured cartoons: The Unexpected Pest (1956), Believe It or Else (1939), Hook, Line and Stinker (1958), Really Scent (1959), The Windblown Hare (1949)
600	145	"Summer Thrills"	August 28, 2023
Bill & Toony try out some extreme summer sports. Featured cartoons: The Dog House (1952), Lost and Foundry (1937), Mutts About Racing (1958), Whizzard of Ow (2003), Hare-Abian Nights (1959)
601	146	"Which Tooner Gets the Toon III"	August 29, 2023
Bill and Toony compete in challenges to see which viewer gets their cartoon request, but Mr. Quizzer shows up as a surprise competitor. Featured cartoons: The Rebel Without Claws (1961), Toreadorable (1953), Lady, Play Your Mandolin! (1931), You're Not Built That Way (1936), We're on Our Way to Rio (1944)
602	147	"TV Moms & Dads"	August 30, 2023
Bill and Toony celebrate the best moms and dads from classic TV. Featured cartoons: Busy Buddies (1956), My Pop, My Pop (1940), I'd Love to Take Orders from You (1936), The Squawkin' Hawk (1942), Pop 'im Pop! (1950)
603	148	"Camp Watchingtoon III"	August 31, 2023
Bill & Toony enjoy the final days of summer camp at Camp Watchingtoon. Featured cartoons: 8 Ball Bunny (1950), Corn Plastered (1951), Curtain Razor (1949), Bugged by a Bee (1969), Little Beau Pepé (1952)
604	149	"Return of the Nerd"	September 5, 2023
Bill longs for the days of nerds being outsiders, so he wants to bring back and celebrate things that will NEVER be cool… or will they? Featured cartoons: Little Boy Boo (1954), See Ya Later Gladiator (1968), Super-Rabbit (1943), Whoops! I'm a Cowboy (1937), Daffy Duck & Egghead (1938)
605	150	"Train-ing Days"	September 6, 2023
Bill and Toony take a long distance train trip. Featured cartoons: Beep, Beep (1952), Porky's Railroad (1937), Boston Quackie (1957), Onion Pacific (1940), Half-Fare Hare (1956)
606	151	"Tailgate Kick Off"	September 7, 2023
Bill and Toony celebrate the start of football season with special guests including the Chicago Honey Bears and chef and pitmaster, Dominique Leach, from Food Network's BBQ Brawl. Featured cartoons: Lovelorn Leghorn (1951), You Gotta Be a Football Hero (1935), Football Bugs (1936), Fiesta Fiasco (1967), Ducking the Devil (1957)
607	152	"Scrappy Living"	September 8, 2023
Bill and Toony celebrate Zero Waste Week with waste-reducing hacks. Featured cartoons: Backwoods Bunny (1959), Bell Hoppy (1954), House Cleaning Blues (1937), Aviation Vacation (1941), Filet Meow (1966)
608	153	"That's 100 Years Old?!"	September 11, 2023
Bill and Toony talk about all of the cool things introduced in 1923. Note: Notably, the airing of Science Friction would mark the addition of Woody Woodpecker to the series' cartoon library (barring the public-domain short Pantry Panic). Featured cartoons: The Duck Doctor (1952), The Milky Way (1940), Feud with a Dude (1968), Science Friction (1963), Wild Over You (1953)
609	154	"Let's Go Antiquing!"	September 12, 2023
Bill and Toony go antiquing in search of valuable treasures. Featured cartoons: Porky Chops (1949), Sleepy Time Chimes (1971), Little Blabbermouse (1940), It's Greek to Me-ow! (1961), Bugs Bunny Rides Again (1948)
610	155	"Retro Computers"	September 13, 2023
Bill dusts off his computer from the 80s to teach Toony about retro computers. Featured cartoons: To Hare is Human (1956), To Catch a Woodpecker (1957), The Hasty Hare (1952), Nuts and Volts (1964), Rocket Squad (1956)
611	156	"Life at a Glantz"	September 14, 2023
Bill and Toony enjoy all Walter Lantz-produced cartoons featuring Woody Woodpecker, Chilly Willy, Oswald Rabbit, and more. Featured cartoons: Woody Woodpecker (1941), The Egg Cracker Suite (1943), Apple Andy (1946), St. Moritz Blitz (1961), Phoney Pony (1969), Misguided Missile (1958)
612	157	"Ham Radio and Cheese"	September 18, 2023
Breaker, breaker! Bill shows Toony the joys of amateur radio, from ham to C.B. Featured cartoons: Often an Orphan (1949), The Reckless Driver (1946), The Fire Alarm (1936), Go Go Amigo (1965), Peck Up Your Troubles (1945)
613	158	"I Want an Old Drugstore"	September 20, 2023
Bill shows Toony all the wonders of vintage drugstores, from the soda fountains to the comic books and records. Featured cartoons: Real Gone Woody (1954), Naughty but Mice (1939), Robin Hood Daffy (1958), Boulder Wham! (1965), Hurdy-Gurdy Hare (1950)
614	159	"Last Gasp of Summer"	September 21, 2023
Bill and Toony soak up the final day of summer with some last minute adventures. Featured cartoons: Drooler's Delight (1949), Boobs in the Woods (1950), The Little Goldfish (1939), Hot Air Aces (1949), Mouse into Space (1962)
615	160	"Something Fishing is Going On"	September 22, 2023
Bill takes Toony fishing. You read that right. Of course, there's a catch. Well, not that kind of catch. Featured cartoons: Stage Door Cartoon (1944), Fish and Slips (1962), Fish Tales (1936), The Legend of Rockabye Point (1955), Cat Fishin' (1947)
616	161	"Leaves Please!"	September 25, 2023
Bill and Toony visit top spots in U.S. for gorgeous fall foliage. Featured cartoons: Red Riding Hoodwinked (1955), Eggnapper (1961), Cat Napping (1951), Hot-Rod and Reel! (1959), Rabbit Fire (1951)
617	162	"Back in '93"	September 26, 2023
Toony thinks he knows than Bill about the year 1993. Them's fightin' words! Well, a trivia fight. Featured cartoons: Hare-Way to the Stars (1958), The Night Watchman (1938), Airlift a la Carte (1971), Book Revue (1946), Flirty Birdy (1945)
618	163	"Toony Makes a Fortune"	September 27, 2023
Investigating if Toony can predict the future or if he just ate a bunch of fortune cookies; a psychic visits to help. Featured cartoons: The Wise Quacking Duck (1943), Mouse Trapped (1959), The Crystal Brawl (1957), I'm Just Wild About Jerry (1965), Bowery Bugs (1949)
619	164	"Oktoberfest"	September 28, 2023
Bill and Toony travel to Munich to celebrate Oktoberfest. Featured cartoons: Hare Trimmed (1953), The Cuckoo Clock (1950), Grampy's Indoor Outing (1936), Pigs in a Polka (1943), The Woody Woodpecker Polka (1951)
620	165	"Fall Crafting"	October 2, 2023
Toony tries to fetch some cash with Bill's DIY fall crafts. Featured cartoons: Whoa, Be-Gone! (1958), Porky's Tire Trouble (1939), Peck of Trouble (1968), The Counterfeit Cat (1949), Rabbit Seasoning (1952)
621	166	"Nice Trip"	October 3, 2023
Bill calls the Travel Mom for fall travel ideas to help Toony kick the summer blues. Featured cartoons: Lighthouse Mouse (1955), The Tree Surgeon (1944), Pitchin' Woo At the Zoo (1944), Tumble Weed Greed (1969), The Iceman Ducketh (1964)
622	167	"Picture Day"	October 5, 2023
It's picture day. Bill and Toony pose for their retro-styled portrait, as Bill reminisces about the good ol' days of taking a real photograph. Featured cartoons: Elmer's Candid Camera (1940), Shutter Bug (1963), Shutter Bugged Cat (1967), Rushing Roulette (1965), Goofy Gophers (1947)
623	168	"Everyone's a Critic"	October 9, 2023
Bill and Toony prove the critics wrong as they look back at negative reviews of some of pop culture's most iconic music, movies, and more. Featured cartoons: Baby Buggy Bunny (1954), Tweet Zoo (1957), Ace in the Hole (1942), Advance and Be Mechanized (1967), For Scent-imental Reasons (1949)
624	169	"Bill Goes to Homecoming"	October 11, 2023
Bill receives a special invitation to attend the homecoming dance at his old high school. Featured cartoons: The Cat's Bah (1954), Sufferin' Cats (1961), The Dance Contest (1934), Down Beat Bear (1956), Hillbilly Hare (1950)
625	170	"Martial Mellow"	October 12, 2023
Bill and Toony take a look back at the Kung Fu craze of the 1970s with a surprise visit from a martial arts master. Featured cartoons: Hare Force (1944), Truant Student (1959), Neapolitan Mouse (1954), Operation Sawdust (1953), To Duck or Not to Duck (1943)
626	171	"Fall Festival"	October 13, 2023
Bill and Toony enjoy a day at the fall festival featuring carnival rides, apple bobbing, and a caramel apple drink. Featured cartoons: I Taw a Putty Tat (1948), Crowin' Pains (1962), Fair and Worm-er (1946), Jitterbug Jive (1950), A Wild Hare (1940)
627	172	"That's Amazing!"	October 17, 2023
An hour of fascinating facts that will have you shocked and amazed. Featured cartoons: Captain Hareblower (1954), Porky's Poppa (1938), Greetings Bait (1943), Salmon Loafer (1963), A Tale of Two Kitties (1942)
628	173	"Glamping"	October 18, 2023
Toony introduces Bill to a new luxurious way of camping called glamping. Featured cartoons: Tweet Tweet Tweety (1951), Double-Cross-Country Race (1951), Two Gophers from Texas (1948), Hot Rod Huckster (1954), Royal Cat Nap (1958)
629	174	"The Fire Drill"	October 20, 2023
Alright, everyone outside! Use the buddy system! Plus, Safety Dan talks dangerous toys from our youth. Featured cartoons: Smoked Hams (1947), The Two-Alarm Fire (1934), Ain't That Ducky (1945), Mother Hubba-Hubba-Hubbard (1947), Now Hare This (1958)
630	175	"Witch Way to Salem"	October 23, 2023
Bill and Toony visit Salem, Massachusetts, to soak up the local witch lore. Featured cartoons: The Flying Sorceress (1956), Bewitched Bunny (1954), Rock-a-Bye Bear (1952), Witch Crafty (1955), A-Haunting We Will Go (1966)
631	176	"Power of the Pumpkin"	October 24, 2023
Bill and Toony explore all things pumpkin and receive a special gift from an actual pumpkin carver. Featured cartoons: Kit for Cat (1948), Spree Lunch (1957), Dr. Devil and Mr. Hare (1964), One Horse Town (1968), Moby Duck (1965)
632	177	"Alien Encounter"	October 25, 2023
Is Toony an alien? A UFO investigative researcher will help us find out. Featured cartoons: Mad as a Mars Hare (1963), Woodpecker from Mars (1956), Martian Through Georgia (1962), Rocket to Mars (1946), Duck Dodgers in the 24½th Century (1953)
633	178	"The Haunted Elevator"	October 26, 2023
Bill, Toony and Blob E. Blob get stuck on the way to Svengoolie's Halloween party. Featured cartoons: Corn on the Cop (1965), Ghosks is the Bunk (1939), Wild Bill Hiccup (1970), Is My Palm Read (1933), Hyde and Hare (1955)
634	179	"Corn Maze"	October 27, 2023
Bill and Toony take a trip to Goebbert's Farm to see a corn maze, pig races, a pumpkin eating dinosaur and more. Featured cartoons: Chili Con Corny (1972), Crop Chasers (1939), Cobs and Robbers (1953), Zoom and Bored (1957), Jack-Wabbit and the Beanstalk (1943)
635	180	"Ghosts!"	October 30, 2023
Bill and Toony explore paranormal phenomena with real ghost hunters. Featured cartoons: Haunted Mouse (1965), Big Game Haunt (1968), Shiver Me Timbers! (1934), Phantom of the Horse Opera (1961), The Duxorcist (1987)
636	181	"Trick-or-Treat!"	October 31, 2023
A spooktacular Halloween celebration with creepy treats from Chef James Cox of Food Network's "Halloween Baking Championship" and special appearance by Sventoonie. Featured cartoons: Broom-Stick Bunny (1956), Fright to the Finish (1954), Trick or Tweet (1959), Hair-Raising Hare (1946), Fowled Up Party (1957)
637	182	"Basketbill"	November 2, 2023
Bill has an uncanny ability to shoot baskets… but can he beat Teddy Roosevelt one-on-one? Featured cartoons: Along Came Daffy (1947), Gym Jam (1950), Cue Ball Cat (1950), Pied Piper Porky (1939), Going! Going! Gosh! (1952)
638	183	"Supertoony and Bill Man"	November 7, 2023
As Toony dreams of having his own comic book, Bill welcomes the owners of Challengers Comics… and their tiny doppelgangers. Featured cartoons: The Great Piggy Bank Robbery (1946), She-Sick Sailors (1944), A Bear for Punishment (1951), The Unbearable Salesman (1957), Gee Whiz-z-z-z-z-z-z (1956)
639	184	"An Idol Mind"	November 8, 2023
Bill tries to transform himself into a teen idol of yesteryear. Featured cartoons: Catch as Cats Can (1947), The CooCoo Nut Grove (1936), Chiller Dillers (1968), Duck! Rabbit, Duck! (1953), Portrait of the Artist as a Young Bunny (1980); Note: This is the first episode to air a newly upgraded restored print of a theatrical cartoon. In this case, it was Merrie Melodies' Catch as Cats Can starring Sylvester. Previously, it was unrestored.
640	185	"Tiki Toony"	November 9, 2023
Bill and Toony revisit the tiki craze and learn to make some tropical mocktails. Featured cartoons: Hawaiian Aye Aye (1964), Shape Ahoy (1945), Cruise Cat (1952), Stowaway Woody (1963), Wackiki Wabbit (1943)
641	186	"Ode to Vets"	November 10, 2023
Bill and Toony pay homage to those who have served in the U.S. armed forces. Featured cartoons: Forward March Hare (1953), Of Thee I Sting (1946), Service with a Guile (1946), Little Johnny Jet (1953), Conrad the Sailor (1942)
642	187	"Be Kind"	November 13, 2023
Bill practices random acts of kindness — though Mr. Quizzer might beg to differ. Featured cartoons: Skyscraper Caper (1968), The Cat Came Back (1936), Bulldozing the Bull (1938), Of Rice and Hen (1953), Feed the Kitty (1952)
643	188	"Rock-a-Billy"	November 15, 2023
Bill and Toony dive into all things rockabilly. Special guest Jeff Cole of the Rockabilly Artists Alliance joins. Featured cartoons: My Generation G...G... Gap (2004), Symphony in Spinach (1948), The Country Mouse (1935), Little Televillain (1958), Bugs Bunny Gets the Boid (1942)
644	189	"National Fast Food Day"	November 16, 2023
Bill prefers the fast food of the past — and has the polyester uniform to prove it. Featured cartoons: Daffy Duck in Hollywood (1938), Hello How Am I (1939), Fair Weather Fiends (1946), Barbecue Brawl (1956), French Rarebit (1951)
645	190	"Making the Band"	November 17, 2023
Toony is on a quest to start his own boy band and solicits advice from former boy band member, Raymond Acevedo of Menudo. Featured cartoons: Baton Bunny (1959), Banty Raids (1963), The Bandmaster (1947), The Music Mice-Tro (1967), Rock 'n' Rodent (1967)
646	191	"How Absurd!"	November 20, 2023
Bill and Toony celebrate the incompatible, the weird, and the downright confusing for National Absurdity Day. Featured cartoons: Daffy Doodles (1946), Bats in the Belfry (1960), Wild About Hurry (1959), Rough and Tumbleweed (1961), Rabbit Rampage (1955)
647	192	"I Never Learned..."	November 21, 2023
Can you wiggle your ears or wink? Bill learns there are some things not everyone can do. Featured cartoons: Rabbit Hood (1949), Operation Cold Feet (1957), Quack Shot (1954), Woody's Knight Mare (1969), Professor Tom (1948)
648	193	"Game Time!"	November 24, 2023
Two lucky contestants play Time Capsule Trivia with Mr. Quizzer. Featured cartoons: The Ducksters (1950), The Dot and the Line (1965), Bedevilled Rabbit (1957), Lucky Ducky (1948)
649	194	"Couch Potatoes"	November 28, 2023
Bill and Toony welcome two special guests, Marissa Chastain and Fee Basanavicius of Trash Panda Comedy, to veg out on the couch and talk cartoons. Featured cartoons: Long-Haired Hare (1949), More Pep (1936), The House of Tomorrow (1949), Nearlyweds (1957), Slicked-up Pup (1951)
650	195	"Old News"	November 29, 2023
Breaking News! Bill and Toony become newscasters and profile legendary news anchor, Bill Kurtis. Featured cartoons: Nutty News (1942), I Got Plenty of Mutton (1944), Person to Bunny (1960), Hot Time On Ice (1967), Porky's Snooze Reel (1941)
651	196	"Zoot Yourself"	November 30, 2023
Bill slips on a zoot suit and learns to jitterbug as he revisits the swing craze. Featured cartoons: The Zoot Cat (1944), Mother Goose in Swingtime (1939), With Poopdeck Pappy (1940), Baby Bottleneck (1946), Swing Shift Cinderella (1945)
652	197	"#Hibernating"	December 1, 2023
Toony teaches Bill his hibernating techniques to stay warm and cozy during the winter months. Featured cartoons: Cracked Quack (1952), Snow Place Like Home (1966), What's Brewin', Bruin? (1948), Banquet Busters (1948), Water, Water Every Hare (1952)
653	198	"Summer in December"	December 5, 2023
Bill and Toony attempt to have a summer celebration in December. Featured cartoons: Henhouse Henery (1949), Chilly Chums (1967), Boulevardier from the Bronx (1936), Ventriloquist Cat (1950), Lumber Jerks (1955)
654	199	"Snowbirds"	December 6, 2023
Bill and Toony escape the winter and head to sunny Florida for some warm adventures. Featured cartoons: Daffy's Southern Exposure (1942), Gabby's Diner (1961), The First Swallow (1942), Charlie's Golf Classic (1970), Southbound Duckling (1955)
655	200	"Boop!"	December 7, 2023
Bill and Toony celebrate Boop! The Musical with all Betty Boop cartoons. Featured cartoons: Betty Boop's Crazy Inventions (1933), Betty Boop's Rise to Fame (1934), Swat the Fly (1935), A Language All My Own (1935), The Hot Air Salesman (1937)
656	201	"Space Race"	December 8, 2023
Bill and Toony go on a space mission and meet a real-life astronaut. Featured cartoons: Spaced Out Bunny (1980), Popeye, the Ace of Space (1953), Space Mouse (1959), Beep Prepared (1961), Rocket Racket (1962)
657	202	"A Most Unusual Winter"	December 14, 2023
Bill and Toony embark on some wacky winter adventures. Featured cartoons: Kitty Kornered (1946), Vicious Viking (1967), The A-Tom-inable Snowman (1966), Alpine Antics (1936), Piker's Peak (1957)
658	203	"O Christmas Tree"	December 15, 2023
Tinsel time! Bill and Toony put up and decorate their retro Christmas tree. Featured cartoons: Snowtime for Comedy (1941), Mister and Mistletoe (1955), One Ham's Family (1943), Gift Wrapped (1952), Holiday for Shoestrings (1946)
659	204	"MeTV Holiday Party"	December 18, 2023
Bill and Toony get festive with their co-workers at the MeTV Holiday Party. Featured cartoons: Snowbody Loves Me (1964), Snow Excuse (1966), Barney Bear's Polar Pest (1944), Tugboat Granny (1956), Gifts from the Air (1937)
660	205	"Mele Kalikimaka"	December 19, 2023
Bill and Toony throw a tropical Christmas party complete with hula dancers. Featured cartoons: Too Hop to Handle (1956), Hopalong Casualty (1960), Wild Elephinks (1933), Robinson Gruesome (1959), Fright Before Christmas (1979)
661	206	"Retro Wish List"	December 20, 2023
What will Toony get Bill for Christmas? Bill explores the hottest Christmas toys of the past to help him decide. Featured cartoons: Fast and Furry-ous (1949), Hold That Rock (1956), Novelty Shop (1936), Seasin's Greetinks! (1933), The Night Before Christmas (1941)
662	207	"It's All About Tradition"	December 21, 2023
Bill and Toony celebrate Christmas traditions around the world. Featured cartoons: Snow Business (1953), The Pups' Christmas (1936), Holiday Land (1934), Bedtime for Sniffles (1940)
663	208	"The Carol Chanting Show"	December 22, 2023
It's a holiday sing-along as Bill and Toony welcome Christmas carolers… and Santa Claus. Featured cartoons: The Abominable Snow Rabbit (1961), Jerky Turkey (1968), The Peachy Cobbler (1950), Ski for Two (1944), Bugs Bunny's Christmas Carol (1979)
664	209	"Best of Chef Bill"	December 28, 2023
Bill reminsces about all his wonderful recipes for his new cookbook. Featured cartoons: To Beep or Not to Beep (1963), Shishkabugs (1962), Hot Diggity Dog (1967), Lumberjack and Jill (1949), The Leghorn Blows at Midnight (1950)
665	210	"2023 Rewind"	December 29, 2023
That's a wrap! Bill and Toony recap the highlights of 2023. Featured cartoons: Guided Mouse-ille (1967), Quentin Quail (1946), You Gotta Be a Football Hero (1935), Duck Amuck (1953), The Big Birdcast (1938)
