= Stars of Space Jam =

1996 collection of Looney Tunes VHS tapes

Stars of Space Jam is a collection of Looney Tunes VHS tapes released in 1996 to promote the release of Space Jam. A Japanese LaserDisc of this set was released around the same time. Each tape/side featured six cartoons, most of which had not been made available on home video before. This was also notably the first video series with a video featuring all the cartoons of the Tasmanian Devil. The series was discontinued around the time the Looney Tunes Presents video series came out.

Each tape in this series began with a short version of the "Warner Bros. Family Entertainment" logo as seen on Warner Bros. Animation's cartoon shows (albeit with a short Merrie Melodies fanfare).

DVD releases were released on October 9, 2018, with some slight changes to the Bugs Bunny and Daffy Duck releases.

In addition to the separate DVDs, a stand-alone single-disc collection was announced, containing all 30 cartoons from all five sets, it was released as Volume 1, meaning there could be more volumes planned.

== Character volumes ==
Character	Shorts in VHS/LD:	Shorts in DVD:
Bugs Bunny	Hot Cross Bunny; Barbary Coast Bunny; Homeless Hare; Apes of Wrath; Forward March Hare; Hare Splitter	Hot Cross Bunny; Homeless Hare; Hare Splitter; Apes of Wrath; Forward March Hare; Ali Baba Bunny
Daffy Duck	Fool Coverage; The High and the Flighty; Person to Bunny; Holiday for Drumsticks; Stupor Duck; Boston Quackie	Fool Coverage; The High and the Flighty; Person to Bunny; Stupor Duck; Boston Quackie; Daffy Duck Slept Here
Tasmanian Devil	Devil May Hare; Bedevilled Rabbit; Ducking the Devil; Bill of Hare; Dr. Devil and Mr. Hare; The Fright Before Christmas	Devil May Hare; Bedevilled Rabbit; Ducking the Devil; Bill of Hare; Dr. Devil and Mr. Hare; The Fright Before Christmas
Sylvester and Tweety	Canary Row; Putty Tat Trouble; Snow Business; Sandy Claws; Tree Cornered Tweety; Tweet Zoo	Canary Row; Putty Tat Trouble; Snow Business; Sandy Claws; Tree Cornered Tweety; Tweet Zoo
Road Runner and Wile E. Coyote	Gee Whiz-z-z-z-z-z-z; Zoom and Bored; Fast and Furry-ous; Zip 'N Snort; Hook, Line and Stinker; Hot-Rod and Reel!	Gee Whiz-z-z-z-z-z-z; Zoom and Bored; Fast and Furry-ous; Zip 'N Snort; Hook, Line and Stinker; Hot-Rod and Reel!

== Notes ==
- On the DVD version of Stars of Space Jam, on the Bugs Bunny DVD collection, "Barbary-Coast Bunny" is replaced by "Ali Baba Bunny", while on the Daffy Duck DVD collection, "Holiday for Drumsticks" is replaced by "Daffy Duck Slept Here".
- On the DVD version of Stars of Space Jam, all cartoon shorts which had previously been restored and remastered for DVD and Blu-ray use those transfers, though shorts that were not yet restored, such as "Hot Cross Bunny", "Hare Splitter", "Boston Quackie", "Hot-Rod and Reel!" and "Zip 'n Snort", use the previous unrestored transfers from the 1996 VHS collection. However, on the Sylvester and Tweety DVD collection, both "Tree Cornered Tweety" and "Tweet Zoo" still keep their unrestored VHS transfers, despite both shorts having been restored and remastered for the I Love Tweety Volume 2 Japanese DVD, for reasons unknown.
- Both the restored transfers of "Apes of Wrath" and "Person to Bunny" are presented in their original correct 4:3 aspect ratios on this DVD set, as opposed to the cropped widescreen versions as seen on their respective Looney Tunes Super Stars DVD sets they originated from.
- Much like the original 1996 VHS collection, all the cartoons on the 2018 DVD collection are uncut and uncensored.
- The entire contents of the Tasmanian Devil DVD collection were previously released on the Looney Tunes Platinum Collection Volume 1 Blu-ray set, consisting of all five fully restored Taz cartoons from the original theatrical series ("Devil May Hare", "Bedevilled Rabbit", "Ducking the Devil", "Bill of Hare", and "Dr. Devil and Mr. Hare") in their correct 4:3 formats, including "Fright Before Christmas" as a bonus feature on the Blu-ray set.
- On the DVD version of Stars of Space Jam, on the Tasmanian Devil DVD collection, "Fright Before Christmas" is presented as the last 10 minutes of the TV special Bugs Bunny's Looney Christmas Tales, including the surrounding bridging sequences and the special's entire end credits, beginning with the part where Bugs and the gang are caroling to "Jingle Bells", as opposed to the stand-alone version of the short (with recreated titles) seen on past home video releases and on TV airings.
- In Europe, there is an additional VHS tape in the Stars of Space Jam series called Stars of Space Jam: Space Tunes, which, unlike the other VHS tapes in this collection, which mainly focus on only one specific Looney Tunes character, it features a variety of Looney Tunes shorts based on the theme of outer space, including some Marvin the Martian cartoons. This tape was released on VHS in the United States as part of Looney Tunes Presents and is referred to as Marvin the Martian: Space Tunes.
