= Road Runner a Go-Go =

- Story by: John Dunn; Chuck Jones; Michael Maltese (both uncredited)
- Starring: Mel Blanc; Dick Beals; Nancy Wible; Paul Julian
- Edited by: Treg Brown
- Music by: Milt Franklyn
- Animation by: Ken Harris; Dick Thompson; Ben Washam; Tom Ray; Bob Bransford
- Layouts by: Maurice Noble
- Backgrounds by: Philip DeGuard
- Color process: Technicolor
- Production company: DePatie–Freleng Enterprises
- Distributed by: Warner Bros. Pictures; The Vitaphone Corporation
- Release date: February 1, 1965 (USA)
- Running time: 6 minutes
- Language: English

Road Runner a Go-Go is a 1965 Warner Bros. Merrie Melodies cartoon. It is one of three cartoons reused from the unsold pilot Adventures of the Road Runner (the others were To Beep or Not to Beep and Zip Zip Hooray!). The short was released on February 1, 1965, and stars Wile E. Coyote and the Road Runner.

Milt Franklyn was credited as the musician with the correct spelling of his name. Unlike To Beep or Not to Beep, this cartoon doesn't feature an entirely new soundtrack by Bill Lava, due to budget cuts. The cartoon includes the sequence of Adventures of the Road Runner with Wile E. Coyote speaking to the viewing audience. The cartoon also features a theme song called Out in the Desert, loosely based on the song Down by the Station.

== Plot ==
Introduction: The cartoon begins with the song "Out On The Desert", a parody of "Down by the Station". During the song, the Roadrunner is seen passing by on the road being chased by Wile E. Coyote, which the song then sings about them. The chase continues until they reach a 3-way fork in the road leaving the Coyote confused where he went. The Roadrunner then zips behind him & almost scares the Coyote. Wile turns around & is scared again from behind. The chase then continues (a scene reused from Hip Hip-Hurry!).

1. The Coyote is seen using a lasso to catch the Roadrunner, but he falls off the cliff & a rock tied onto his lasso falls over him leaving coiled up (footage reused from To Beep or Not to Beep) before the film stops abruptly. It's then revealed that the entire attempt was footage from earlier shorts Wile E. has been studying. He explains to the audience that in a "hazardous business" such as his, he has found it useful to keep track of his daily life so as to study his countless failed schemes, plans, & ideas & to correct errors in his attempts by hooking cameras around the desert in many ways: low angle shots (cameras attached to tortoises), high angle shots (cameras attached to vultures), zoom shots (a camera catapult out of a cactus), truck shots (cameras attached to two snakes), down shots (cameras attached to a cliff), directional shots (cameras attached to direction signs), close-up shots (cameras disguised as Indians), complete coverage shots (cameras hidden in household sceneries, bags, & in cactus costumes), & many others. He then rewinds the footage, briefly pausing to point out each error in the failed attempt. He's then seen doing the lasso trick again, but this time a bridge has been made on the cliff. But when the beeping is heard, it actually belongs to a truck that trips the lasso, sending the Coyote on a wild ride, who, after letting go, leaves the area with a bare rear end from the friction force (a scene reused from Stop! Look! And Hasten!).

2. Wile E. uses a model airplane with a hand grenade, but when he sets it in motion, only the propeller goes, so he throws the entire plane but the grenade still hangs in midair, so the Coyote braces himself as the explosion occurs (reused from Zip 'N Snort).

3. Wile E. now uses a bow to launch himself at the Roadrunner, but instead of being launched, he is crushed by the bow's sides (also reused from Zip 'N Snort).

4. Wile E. then tries to catapult a giant rock from a high ledge over the Roadrunner, but it instead lands on Wile E (also reused from Zip 'N Snort).

5. Finally, back in his study, Wile E. is looking over a schematic for the catapult from To Beep or Not to Beep, and points out how simple it is to operate that even a child could work it. What follows is the first five attempts to use the catapult, only for each one to backfire in some way on Wile E. so he gets crushed. Returning to the blueprint, now covered in bandages, casts, and using a cane, Wile E. sarcastically quotes himself from earlier about how easy it is to operate that a child could handle it before declaring "Bah!" and whacking the blueprint with his cane, causing the catapult in the blueprint to trigger and clobber him with its boulder, knocking him out once and for all. The camera then zooms down to a label on the blueprint, revealing it to be made by the "Road Runner Blue-Print Co. — Phoenix * Taos * Santa Fe * Flagstaff and Elsewhere". The Road Runner on the label then comes to life, gives the audience a "Beep-Beep" and then zooms off.

== Home media ==
The theatrical release version of the original pilot is available on Looney Tunes Golden Collection Volume 2, Disc 2.
