= Lists of American comedy television episodes =

This is a list of lists of American comedy television episodes.

== Comedy ==
- List of Aaahh!!! Real Monsters episodes
- List of Adam Ruins Everything episodes
- List of Alias Smith and Jones episodes
- List of The Amanda Show episodes
- List of Animaniacs episodes
- List of The Aquabats! Super Show! episodes
- List of Austin & Ally episodes
- List of Batman (TV series) episodes
- List of Bella and the Bulldogs episodes
- List of Betty White's Off Their Rockers episodes
- List of The Big C episodes
- List of Big City Greens episodes
- List of Bizaardvark episodes
- List of Bunk'd episodes
- List of Cake (2019 TV series) episodes
- List of The Casagrandes episodes
- List of CatDog episodes
- List of Celebrity Deathmatch episodes
- List of Check It Out! with Dr. Steve Brule episodes
- List of Cinema Insomnia episodes
- List of The Colbert Report episodes
- List of Comedy Bang! Bang! (TV series) episodes
- List of Comedy Central Presents episodes
- List of Coop & Cami Ask the World episodes
- List of The Daily Show episodes
- List of Danger Force episodes
- List of Decker episodes
- List of Dog with a Blog episodes
- List of Drew Carey's Improv-A-Ganza episodes
- List of Drunk History episodes
- List of Ed, Edd n Eddy episodes
- List of Emma Approved episodes
- List of Fridays episodes
- List of Full Frontal with Samantha Bee episodes
- List of Funny or Die Presents episodes
- List of Game Shakers episodes
- List of Getting On episodes
- List of Girl Meets World episodes
- List of Happy Tree Friends episodes
- List of Henry Danger episodes
- List of The High Fructose Adventures of Annoying Orange episodes
- List of Honest Trailers episodes
- List of Hunter Street episodes
- List of I Didn't Do It episodes
- List of Impractical Jokers episodes
- List of In Living Color episodes
- List of Incognito Cinema Warriors XP episodes
- List of Inspector Gadget (1983 TV series) episodes
- List of Invader Zim episodes
- List of The Jack Benny Program episodes
- List of Jackass episodes
- List of Jessie episodes
- List of The Joey Bishop Show episodes
- List of K.C. Undercover episodes
- List of Key & Peele episodes
- List of Kickin' It episodes
- List of Kirby Buckets episodes
- List of Lab Rats episodes
- List of The Last Man on Earth episodes
- List of Last Week Tonight with John Oliver episodes
- List of Late Show with David Letterman episodes
- List of Father Knows Best episodes
- List of Liv and Maddie episodes
- List of The Lizzie Bennet Diaries episodes
- List of The Loud House episodes
- List of Mad episodes
- List of Mad TV episodes
- List of The Man Show episodes
- List of Maron episodes
- List of Mighty Med episodes
- List of Most Extreme Elimination Challenge episodes
- List of The Most Popular Girls in School episodes
- List of Mystery Science Theater 3000 episodes
- List of Nathan for You episodes
- List of Nicky, Ricky, Dicky & Dawn episodes
- List of The Nightly Show with Larry Wilmore episodes
- List of Off the Air episodes
- List of OK K.O.! Let's Be Heroes episodes
- List of On Cinema episodes
- List of The Pink Panther cartoons
- List of Portlandia episodes
- List of Punk'd episodes
- List of The Real McCoys episodes
- List of Ridiculousness episodes (season 21–present)
- List of Ridiculousness episodes (seasons 1–20)
- List of Robot Chicken episodes
- List of Romeo! episodes
- List of Rowan & Martin's Laugh-In episodes
- Lists of Saturday Night Live episodes
- List of Saturday Night Live episodes (seasons 1–30)
- List of Saturday Night Live episodes (season 31–present)
- List of School of Rock episodes
- List of The Scooby-Doo Show episodes
- List of The State episodes
- List of Stuck in the Middle episodes
- List of Studio C episodes
- List of Superjail! episodes
- List of Sydney to the Max episodes
- List of Talkshow with Spike Feresten episodes
- List of Teen Titans Go! episodes
- List of The Thundermans episodes
- List of Tim and Eric Awesome Show, Great Job! episodes
- List of Toon In with Me episodes
- List of Toon In with Me episodes (2021)
- List of Toon In with Me episodes (2022)
- List of Toon In with Me episodes (2023)
- List of Toon In with Me episodes (2024)
- List of Toon In with Me episodes (2025)
- List of Toon In with Me episodes (2026)
- List of Tosh.0 episodes
- List of Tracey Takes On... episodes
- List of Tracey Ullman's State of the Union episodes
- List of The Troop episodes
- List of Tyler Perry's Young Dylan episodes
- List of Walk the Prank episodes
- List of The Whitest Kids U' Know episodes
- List of Whose Line Is It Anyway? (American TV series) episodes
- List of Yo Gabba Gabba! episodes

== Comedy drama ==
- List of Ally McBeal episodes
- List of Andi Mack episodes
- List of Angel episodes
- List of Atlanta episodes
- List of Awkward episodes
- List of Being Human (North American TV series) episodes
- List of Body of Proof episodes
- List of BoJack Horseman episodes
- List of Boston Legal episodes
- List of Californication episodes
- List of The Carrie Diaries episodes
- List of Castle episodes
- List of Chuck episodes
- List of Cobra Kai episodes
- List of Crazy Ex-Girlfriend episodes
- List of Daria episodes
- List of Dead Like Me episodes
- List of Desperate Housewives episodes
- List of Devious Maids episodes
- List of Doctor Doctor (American TV series) episodes
- List of Doogie Howser, M.D. episodes
- List of Drop Dead Diva episodes
- List of The Dukes of Hazzard episodes
- List of Early Edition episodes
- List of Ed episodes
- List of Entourage episodes
- List of Every Witch Way episodes
- List of F Is for Family episodes
- List of Faking It (American TV series) episodes
- List of Fargo episodes
- List of Final Space episodes
- List of Franklin & Bash episodes
- List of Gilmore Girls episodes
- List of Girlfriends' Guide to Divorce episodes
- List of Girls episodes
- List of Glee episodes
- List of GLOW episodes
- List of Grace and Frankie episodes
- List of The Greatest American Hero episodes
- List of Greek episodes
- List of Grown-ish episodes
- List of Harry's Law episodes
- List of Hart of Dixie episodes
- List of High School Musical: The Musical: The Series episodes
- List of House of Lies episodes
- List of iZombie episodes
- List of Jane the Virgin episodes
- List of Killing Eve episodes
- List of Las Vegas episodes
- List of Lethal Weapon episodes
- List of Looking episodes
- List of Louie episodes
- List of Lucifer episodes
- List of M*A*S*H episodes
- List of Matlock (1986 TV series) episodes
- List of Maverick episodes
- List of Monk episodes
- List of Moonlighting episodes
- List of Moral Orel episodes
- List of Mozart in the Jungle episodes
- List of Mr. and Mrs. North episodes
- List of Murder in the First episodes
- List of My Three Sons episodes
- List of The Mysteries of Laura episodes
- List of Nip/Tuck episodes
- List of Noah's Arc episodes
- List of Northern Exposure episodes
- List of Nurse Jackie episodes
- List of Orange Is the New Black episodes
- List of Parenthood episodes
- List of Picket Fences episodes
- List of Popular (TV series) episodes
- List of Psych episodes
- List of Pushing Daisies episodes
- List of Queer as Folk episodes
- List of Reaper episodes
- List of Rescue Me episodes
- List of Room 222 episodes
- List of Royal Pains episodes
- List of Scrubs episodes
- List of The Secret World of Alex Mack episodes
- List of Sex and the City episodes
- List of Shameless (American TV series) episodes
- List of Simon & Simon episodes
- List of Succession episodes
- List of Sweet Valley High episodes
- List of Transparent episodes
- List of Tyler Perry's House of Payne episodes
- List of Ugly Betty episodes
- List of United States of Tara episodes
- List of Unreal episodes
- List of The Venture Bros. episodes
- List of Veronica Mars episodes
- List of V.I.P. episodes
- List of Weeds episodes
- List of Wilfred (American TV series) episodes
- List of Witches of East End episodes
- List of The Wonder Years episodes
- List of You're the Worst episodes
- List of Younger episodes
- List of Z Nation episodes
- List of Zoey 101 episodes
