= Billboard Frolics =

1935 film by Isadore Freleng

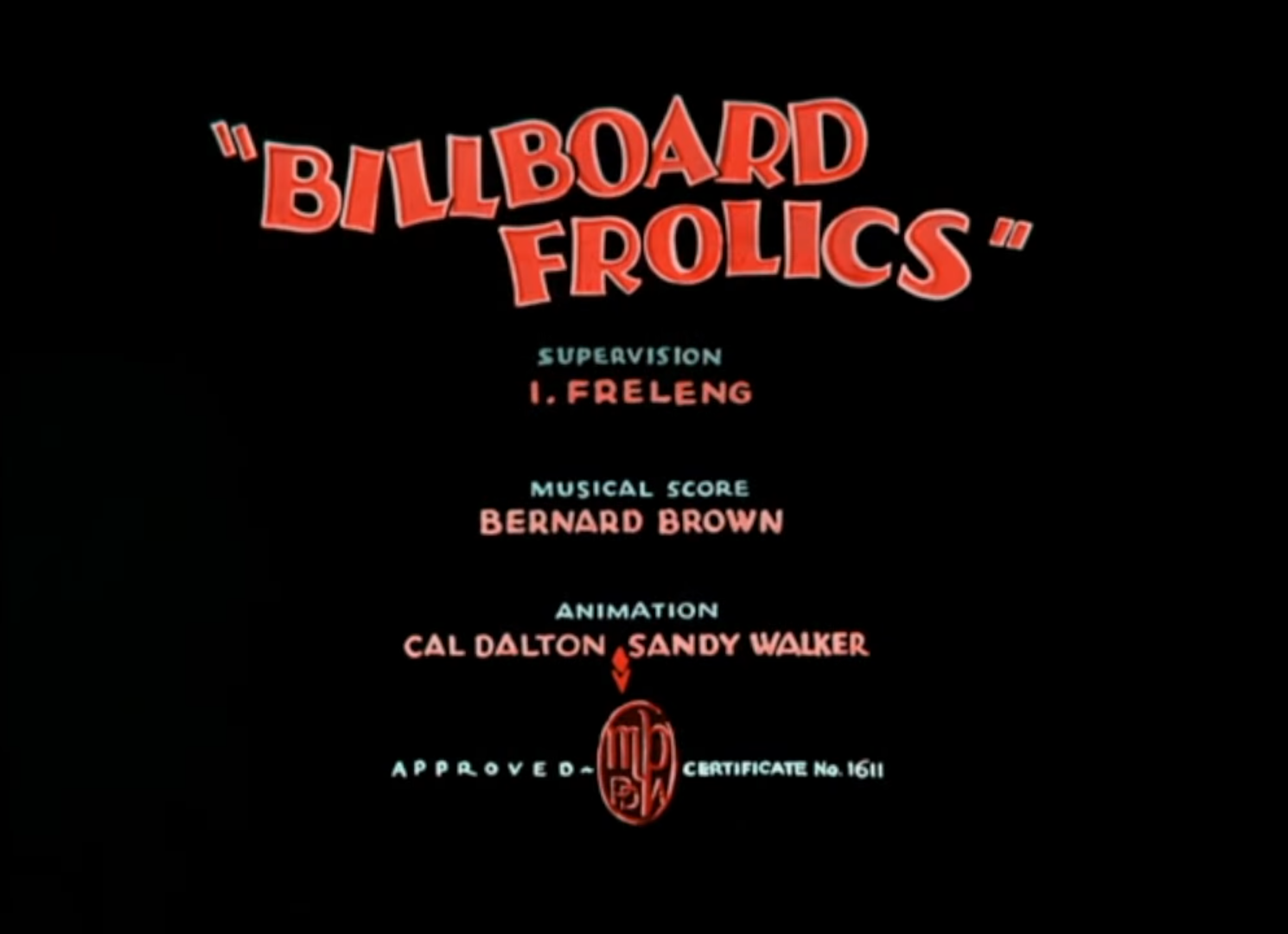
- Title card
- Directed by: Isadore Freleng
- Produced by: Leon Schlesinger
- Starring: Billy Bletcher; The Varsity Three; Count Cutelli; Bernard B. Brown
- Music by: Bernard Brown
- Animation by: Cal Dalton; Sandy Walker
- Color process: Technicolor
- Production company: Leon Schlesinger Productions
- Distributed by: Warner Bros. Productions; The Vitaphone Corporation
- Release date: November 16, 1935
- Running time: 7 minutes
- Country: United States
- Language: English

Billboard Frolics is a 1935 American animated comedy short film directed by Isadore Freleng. The short was released on November 16, 1935. It is the 51st film in the Merrie Melodies series. It is the first film in the series to feature the song "Merrily We Roll Along" by Eddie Cantor, which would later become the opening theme for the Merrie Melodies cartoons, starting with Boulevardier from the Bronx. It is also the final film in the series to use 2 color Technicolor, as Walt Disney Productions' 3-strip Technicolor exclusivity deal expired after its release.

== Plot ==
A billboard advertising caricatures of Eddie Cantor and David Rubinoff comes to life, singing and dancing to "Merrily We Roll Along". Various mascots on posters as well as some clothes come to life and sing and dance too.

A chick mascot (parody of the Bon Ami chick) sees a worm and attempts to eat it, but the worm whips it and runs off after risking being eaten multiple times. The chick, trying to pull out the worm after its escape, ends up pulling a pump that is pressed by a falling piece of metal and causes it to be inflated and briefly floats. A cat sees the chick and starts chasing him. Policemen mascots shoot the cat with machine guns, while the dog mascot from the His Master's Voice logo chases the cat. As the cat corners the chick, an Arm & Hammer logo knocks it out, which the chick celebrates by flying on top of the cat and crowing like a rooster.

== Home media ==
The short is available on disc 1 of the Looney Tunes Collector's Vault: Volume 3 Blu-ray set.
