= List of Toon In with Me episodes =

This is a list of episodes of the American live-action/animated anthology comedy television series Toon In with Me. The show premiered on January 1, 2021, on MeTV. Most shorts featured are from the Golden Age of American animation (mainly 1930s-1960s), though some from the modern era of American animation (1970s to 2000s) have also been included.

== Series overview ==
Year	Episodes	Originally released	
Year	Episodes	First released	Last released
2021	235	January 1, 2021	December 29, 2021
2022	221	January 3, 2022	December 28, 2022
2023	210	January 2, 2023	December 29, 2023
2024	198	January 3, 2024	December 31, 2024
2025	204	January 2, 2025	December 31, 2025
2026	TBA	January 5, 2026	TBA

== Episodes ==
- List of Toon In with Me episodes (2021)
- List of Toon In with Me episodes (2022)
- List of Toon In with Me episodes (2023)
- List of Toon In with Me episodes (2024)
- List of Toon In with Me episodes (2025)
- List of Toon In with Me episodes (2026)
