= Toon In with Me =

American live-action/animated anthology television series

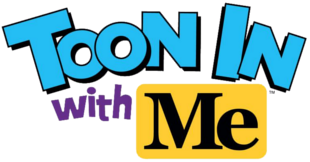
- Genre: Comedy; Anthology; Puppetry
- Created by: Neal Sabin
- Directed by: Mike Schmiedeler
- Presented by: Bill Leff; Kevin Fleming
- Starring: Leila Gorstein
- Country of origin: United States
- Original language: English
- No. of seasons: 6
- No. of episodes: 1,261 (1 preview episode) (list of episodes)

Production
- Executive producer: Neal Sabin
- Producers: Lisa Carl; Adam Manta; John Owens; Rob Rodi
- Running time: 60 minutes
- Production companies: U-City Productions (uncredited); Weigel Production Corp.

Original release
- Network: MeTV; MeTV+ (2021–24); MeTV Toons (2024–present)
- Release: January 1, 2021 – present

Related
- Sventoonie (2022)

Toon In with Me is an American live-action/animated morning anthology television series created by Neal Sabin for MeTV and MeTV Toons. It previously also aired on MeTV+ until the launch of MeTV Toons. A special preview episode aired on January 1, 2021, with the main series officially debuting on January 4, 2021.

Each episode contains four to six animated shorts taken from classic series including Looney Tunes/Merrie Melodies, Tom and Jerry, Betty Boop, Popeye, Color Rhapsody, Woody Woodpecker, Mighty Mouse, and many others.

Unlike previous anthology series or reruns of these classic cartoons, many of these airings are remastered from their original negatives. Many of these remastered shorts have not been released on home media or streaming, making these airings the first time some of the cartoons are seen remastered and restored in HD.

== Premise and characters ==
Toon In with Me harkens back to locally produced children's programs that aired from the 1950s through the 1990s, with a live-action host, comedy and puppet segments in between classic cartoons.

The show is hosted from the MeTV studios by Bill the Cartoon Curator (played by Bill Leff).

His co-host is Toony (puppeteered by Kevin Fleming), a cartoon-loving tuna puppet, whom Bill has to take care of while Toony's owner, Goldie Fisher (Leila Gorstein) (seasons 1–2), is away on a world tour. As they present all of the cartoons, Bill and Toony deal with various issues in the studio, video chat with Goldie and receive useful information from game show host Mr. Quizzer (also played by Fleming). Fleming and Gorstein also play many other characters.

Each episode contains four to six classic animated shorts (except for "MeTV's Cartoon Kick-Off Show", which contains ten), and most shows end with Bill and Toony showing off drawings and photos sent in by fans via the show's website.

On Friday, June 24, 2022, Goldie Fisher left the show in the episode "Farewell Goldie"; as Leila Gorstein exited the series, so did a number of her characters such as Boxcar, Bill's Mom, Lorna Green, Sue P. (from Sales) and others.

== Episodes ==
Year	Episodes	Originally released	
Year	Episodes	First released	Last released
2021	235	January 1, 2021	December 29, 2021
2022	221	January 3, 2022	December 28, 2022
2023	210	January 2, 2023	December 29, 2023
2024	198	January 3, 2024	December 31, 2024
2025	204	January 2, 2025	December 31, 2025
2026	TBA	January 5, 2026	TBA

== Spin-off ==
Sventoonie, a spin-off television series of Toon In with Me, as well as the MeTV hosted horror movie series Svengoolie, premiered on MeTV on March 26, 2022. Sventoonie is also hosted by Toony (voiced and performed by Kevin Fleming). His co-hosts are Blob E. Blob, a puppet blob fish DJ who speaks in sound effects, and Trevor Ground, an undead video store clerk (performed by Steven Fleming). In the series, Sventoonie and his guests provide breakdowns and commentary of a condensed edit of a horror movie from the set of Svengoolie.

On July 16, 2022, MeTV announced that Sventoonie would be renewed for a second season beginning in October 2022. Sventoonie ended on February 25, 2023, with reruns of the classic Batman replacing it the following Saturday night.

== Series featured ==
Toon In with Me showcases classic animated theatrical shorts from the Golden Age of American Animation. Most of the cartoons shown are from Warner Bros. Entertainment or subsidiaries owned by Warner Bros. Discovery, such as Turner Entertainment Co. This includes the original Looney Tunes and Merrie Melodies cartoons made by Warner Bros. Cartoons, cartoons originally made by the Metro-Goldwyn-Mayer cartoon studio (ie. Tom and Jerry, Droopy, Barney Bear, Screwy Squirrel, George and Junior, Happy Harmonies and other one-shot shorts), and the Popeye the Sailor shorts from Fleischer and Famous Studios originally released by Paramount Pictures (under license with King Features Entertainment for the original comics). On some occasions, they have also showcased two theatrical cartoons of Paramount's Superman series (licensed from WB's subsidiary company, DC Comics, for the characters), plus one Private Snafu WWII instructional cartoon from the WB Cartoons studio (in the public domain).

Outside of Warner Bros., Toon In with Me has also showcased cartoons owned by other studios such as Amazon's Metro-Goldwyn-Mayer (i.e., DePatie–Freleng cartoons: The Pink Panther, The Inspector and Roland and Rattfink) from May 2021 to May 2023, Sony's Sony Pictures (Screen Gems' Color Rhapsodies), Paramount Skydance's Paramount Pictures (Max Fleischer's Betty Boop, Color Classics, Paul Terry's Terrytoons like Mighty Mouse, Heckle and Jeckle and Terry Bears, plus the post-1962 Paramount Cartoon Studios library), and Comcast's NBCUniversal (Walter Lantz's Woody Woodpecker, Andy Panda, Chilly Willy, The Beary Family, plus many other color 30s-70s cartoons from his studio). During Christmas seasons, they have also shown the 1948 Rudolph the Red-Nosed Reindeer short by Max Fleischer produced for the Jam Handy Organization, which is also in the public domain.

== See also ==
- Saturday-morning cartoon
- Golden Age of American animation
