= Fast and Furry-ous =

1949 animated short film by Chuck Jones

- Title card
- Directed by: Charles M. Jones
- Story by: Michael Maltese
- Starring: Mel Blanc; Paul Julian (uncredited)
- Music by: Carl Stalling
- Animation by: Ken Harris; Phil Monroe; Ben Washam; Lloyd Vaughan; A.C. Gamer (effects animation)
- Layouts by: Robert Gribbroek
- Backgrounds by: Peter Alvarado
- Color process: Technicolor
- Production company: Warner Bros. Cartoons
- Distributed by: Warner Bros. Pictures; The Vitaphone Corporation
- Release date: September 17, 1949
- Running time: 7:07
- Language: English

Fast and Furry-ous is a 1949 Warner Bros. Looney Tunes cartoon, directed by Chuck Jones and written by Michael Maltese. The short was released on September 17, 1949, and stars Wile E. Coyote and the Road Runner, in their debut.

This was the debut of the Coyote/Road Runner pairing and set the template for the series, in which Wile E. Coyote (here given the mock genus/species name in faux-Latin Carnivorous Vulgaris) tries to catch the Road Runner (Accelleratii Incredibus) through many traps, plans and products. In this first cartoon, not all of the products are yet made by ACME.

The title is a play on the expression "fast and furious".

== Plot ==
When Wile E. Coyote first tries to stab the Road Runner with a knife, he realizes he's not fast enough to outrun the Road Runner, therefore he comes up with an idea to trap the Road Runner using his wit, which was no match for Road Runner's speed and quick wit. After eleven more ideas fail, Coyote hears Road Runner's signature "beep beep" from afar and decides to ambush him head on with an axe, only to find out that it was the sound of a bus's horn. Road Runner is seen in the back of the bus and closes the curtain of the bus's rear window to end the cartoon.

== Reception ==
Warner Bros. writer and editor Charles Carney wrote

This initial outing created in seven minutes a timeless screen legend as durable as Charlie Chaplin, Buster Keaton and Oliver Hardy. Coyote's basic 'humanity' in simply following his instincts — with the help of an arsenal of devices that defy the laws of physics and momentum but always, eventually, yield to gravity — makes him a character of great sympathy... The would-be predator's imploring looks to the audience bring the humor from the cinematic to the personal.

In 2021, Mark Wilson at Fast Company listed this one of the cartoons to watch before Space Jam: A New Legacy. Wilson states "Road Runner and Coyote went on to appear in dozens of shorts together, but my favorite gag is in this particular cartoon. Coyote paints a tunnel on the side of the mountain, hoping Road Runner will strike the rock by mistake," and mentions how the universe is "set up against him," due the fact that the Road Runner runs through as if no wall is there, while the Coyote doesn't.

== Home media ==
Fast and Furry-ous is available in its Blue Ribbon reissue on Looney Tunes Golden Collection: Volume 1, Looney Tunes Spotlight Collection: Volume 1, and Looney Tunes Platinum Collection: Volume 1 in 1080p resolution. It is also available on the "Road Runner Vs. Wile E. Coyote: The Classic Chase" VHS, the "Stars of Space Jam: Wile E. Coyote And Road Runner" VHS and DVD, and the "Road Runner Vs. Wile E. Coyote: If At First You Don't Succeed..." LaserDisc.

== See also ==
- Looney Tunes and Merrie Melodies filmography (1940–1949)
