= There Auto Be a Law =

1953 film by Robert McKimson

- Directed by: Robert McKimson
- Story by: Tedd Pierce
- Starring: Mel Blanc; Bea Benaderet (uncredited); John T. Smith (uncredited)
- Music by: Carl Stalling
- Animation by: Herman Cohen; Phil DeLara; Charles McKimson; Rod Scribner
- Layouts by: Robert Givens
- Backgrounds by: Richard H. Thomas
- Color process: Technicolor
- Production company: Warner Bros. Cartoons
- Distributed by: Warner Bros. Pictures
- Release date: June 6, 1953 (US premiere)
- Running time: 7 min (one reel)
- Language: English

There Auto Be a Law is a 1953 Warner Bros. Looney Tunes cartoon written by Tedd Pierce and directed by Robert McKimson. The short was released on June 6, 1953. It is a blackout gag cartoon about automobiles.

== Plot ==
A narrator (voiced by an uncredited John T. Smith) discusses automobiles and their advancements throughout the last few decades. A meek, short man with a moustache and glasses is seen in many of the sketches. Gags include:

- A pan across many motorists stuck on the road (some of which are beating each other up or yelling at one another) because a woman in the first car is too busy putting on lipstick.
- A man treating his car like a horse, whipping it to make it go faster.
- A bridge that has half the toll, but that's because it's only half finished.
- The meek man parking his car in a lot and getting it back in a paper-thin condition.
- The meek man measuring his car before putting it an auto court garage, but accidentally hitting the car between two close trees.
- The meek man looking both ways before crossing a rural road but still getting hit by a fast-speed car.
- The meek man allowing a stranded motorist to siphon some of his gas, only to swallow the gasoline and begin sputtering down the road like a car.
- The meek man being towed by a fellow motorist but the car frame getting ripped off when the other driver leaves in a hurry.
- The meek man repeatedly stopping at a hamburger stand on a freeway, asking for directions off the freeway. The hamburger stand man (Stan Freberg, uncredited) eventually realizes he doesn't know the way off the freeway and had to open the stand to keep from starving to death. The meek man does the same, only his stand sells mustard and pickles to accompany the burgers.

== Home media ==
The film is available on the Looney Tunes Collector's Choice: Volume 3 Blu-ray.
