= Merrily We Roll Along (song) =

1935 song

Song
- Published: 1935
- Songwriters: Charles Tobias; Murray Mencher; Eddie Cantor

"Merrily We Roll Along" is a song written by Charlie Tobias, Murray Mencher, and Eddie Cantor in 1935, and used in the Merrie Melodies cartoon Billboard Frolics that same year. It is best known as the theme of Warner Bros. Cartoons' Merrie Melodies cartoon series since the 1936-37 season.

== Lyrics ==
The first two lines of Cantor's recording are:

Merrily we roll along, my honey and me
Verily there's no one half as happy as we

== History and usage ==
In the 1970s, it was adopted by WGN as the theme music for The Ray Rayner Show, which featured Warner Bros. cartoons. In 1995, it was used as the closing theme of The Sylvester & Tweety Mysteries. From 1994–2003, it was used by Warner Bros. Television as part of their logo at the end of shows, in reference to the studio's production of Looney Tunes and Merrie Melodies shorts, it was arranged by David Kurtz.

The song shares a title with the 1934 play Merrily We Roll Along by George S. Kaufman and Moss Hart, but is unrelated to it. The song was also an introduction to every Guns N' Roses concert in their Not in This Lifetime... Tour.

The folk song "Goodnight, Ladies" contains the line "Merrily we roll along", which is often used as a child's nursery rhyme. The tune from the first line of the Tobias-Mencher-Cantor song matches that line from "Goodnight, Ladies", but the tunes diverge from there.
