= Boulevardier from the Bronx =

1936 film by Isadore Freleng

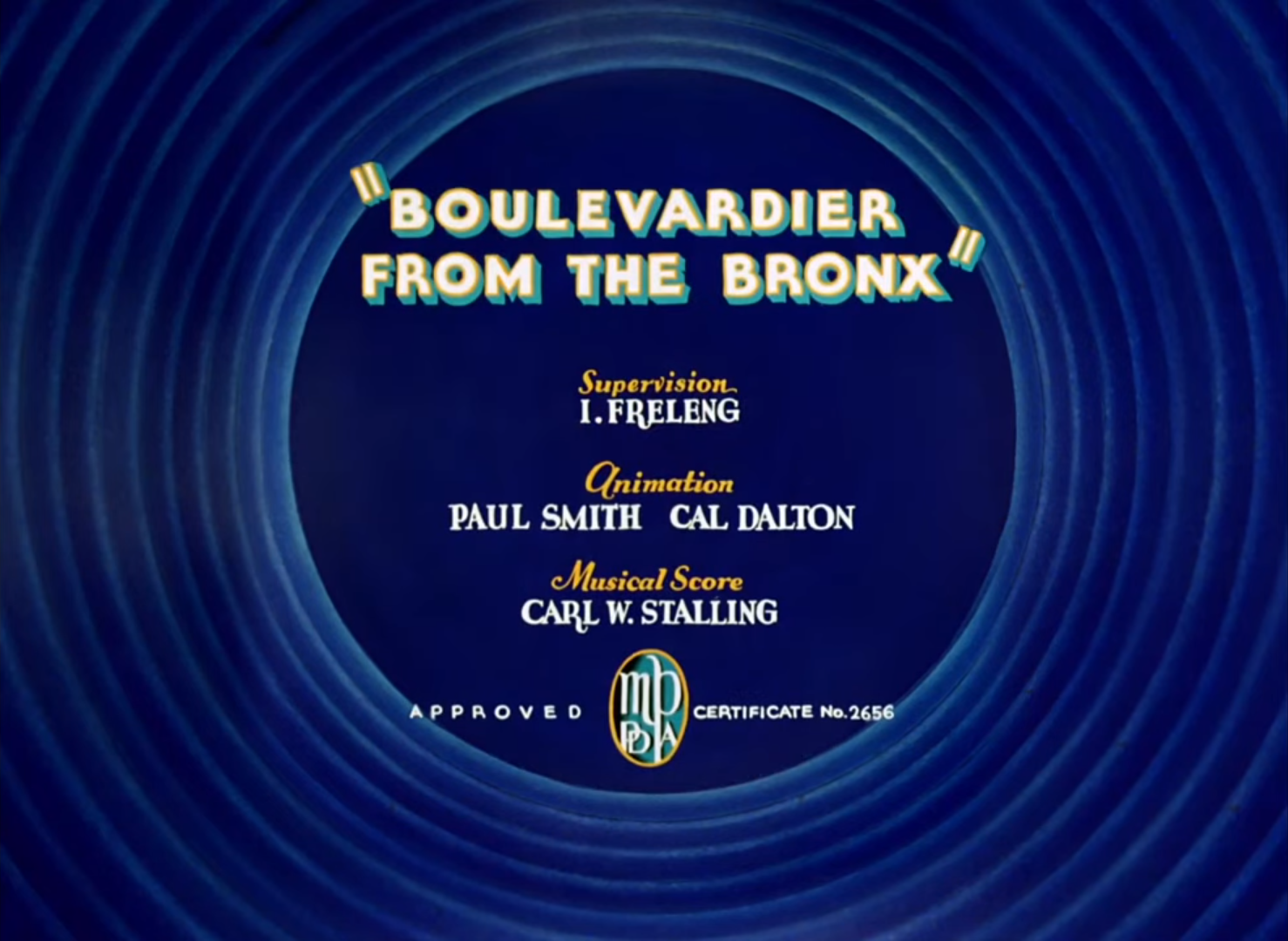
- Title card
- Directed by: Isadore Freleng
- Produced by: Leon Schlesinger
- Music by: Carl W. Stalling
- Animation by: Paul Smith; Cal Dalton
- Color process: Technicolor
- Production company: Leon Schlesinger Productions
- Distributed by: Warner Bros. Productions; The Vitaphone Corporation
- Release date: October 10, 1936
- Running time: 8 min
- Country: United States
- Language: English

Boulevardier from the Bronx is a 1936 American animated comedy short film directed by Isadore Freleng. It was released on October 10, 1936. It is the 65th film in the Merrie Melodies series and the first to use Eddie Cantor's "Merrily We Roll Along" as the intro music, which would become a staple of the series for 28 years until Hawaiian Aye Aye in 1964.

== Plot ==
The baseball team Chicago Giants, led by their famous pitcher Dizzy Dan (a caricature of St. Louis Cardinals pitcher Dizzy Dean), plays an exhibition baseball game in Hickville. The townsfolk wait for his arrival, and when the train stops further from the station, they push the station itself to the train. Emily the Chicken is smitten with Dizzy Dan, much to the chagrin of her boyfriend and amateur baseball player Claude. Dizzy Dan is so proud of himself, he is decorated with lights of "The Great Dizzy Dan" on his back and sings the titular song.

At the baseball match, Dizzy Dan is pitching again a pig caricature of Babe Ruth. He orders his team to back off and slams the turtle player backward twice with his powerful throw, which causes his hand to swell. Knowing that the batter will never hit the ball, the turtle uses a pipe to return the ball to Dizzy Dan.

At the next inning, Claude is pitching against a dachshund batter. He pitches, but nearly beans the batter. Claude tries again, but the dachshund connects the hit. Claude tries to catch the ball, but many baseballs falls to the ground and ultimately dropped the chance for an out. The dachshund stretches across the base quickly by using his body's malleability to his advantage and scores points.

After Dizzy Dan flirts with Emily, he is at bat while Claude is pitching. Filled with hubris, Dan arrogantly allows Claude to hit two strikes, before slamming Claude to the back of the stadium wall with the third hit. Dan runs at super speed to catch the ball after Claude throws it to impress Emily. At the last half, the Hickville team has not received a single point. Dan throws a fastball and a conversely extremely slow curveball, which Claude could not hit properly. The last fastball causes Claude to hit a grand slam home run, allowing Hicksville to win the game. Claude mocks Dan's hubris by repeating his cackle.

== Home media ==
This short is available on disc 1 of the Looney Tunes Collector's Vault: Volume 2 Blu-ray set.
