= Upswept Hare =

- Directed by: Robert McKimson
- Story by: Tedd Pierce
- Starring: Mel Blanc; Arthur Q. Bryan (uncredited)
- Music by: Carl Stalling
- Animation by: Charles McKimson; Herman Cohen; Rod Scribner; Phil DeLara; Keith Darling (uncredited)
- Layouts by: Robert Givens
- Backgrounds by: Richard H. Thomas
- Color process: Technicolor
- Production company: Warner Bros. Cartoons
- Distributed by: Warner Bros. Pictures; The Vitaphone Corporation
- Release date: March 14, 1953
- Running time: 6:53
- Language: English

Upswept Hare is a 1953 Warner Bros. Merrie Melodies cartoon directed by Robert McKimson. The cartoon was released on March 14, 1953, and stars Bugs Bunny and Elmer Fudd.

== Plot ==
The story opens at night with an unseen Bugs preparing to go to sleep. A highway is in the background and immediately after Bugs retires Elmer drives up because he has seen a rare desert flower next to Bugs' hole that he wants to put in his tropical garden. Elmer does not notice the rabbit hole and is unaware of Bugs' presence, but he is careful when digging up the flower to include much room so the flower can "prosper in its native soil". Elmer does not realize that he has unknowingly taken Bugs, as well as the flower back to his penthouse apartment.

The next scene has Bugs emerging from the hole still half-asleep. He obliviously goes into Elmer's penthouse thinking he is headed to his "bathing stream", which instead is a large Roman-styled bathroom with an indoor pool in the middle. Bugs gets into the pool and realizes that he is not in his stream but thinks his surroundings are a mirage so he plays along by splashing around and singing "There's no place like home" but instead substituting Rome for home. Bugs then sings the word "yearn" but, sensing that he might be singing out of tune, gets out of the pool and goes into the next room, where he plays a note on a piano and sings "yearn, fa la yearn" until he is in tune. Elmer sees Bugs go back into the "bathroom" and wonders why Bugs is there. Elmer then gets a shotgun and fires several shots into the pool. Bugs submerges under the water as if he has been killed but then hops out and sneaks behind Elmer, whispering into his ear: "You better plug him again, Mac, just to make sure." Elmer then inserts the barrel of the shotgun into the water and shoots, which results in him blowing a hole in the floor which causes the water to spill into the apartment underneath him. Then a knock is heard on Elmer's door and it is his downstairs neighbor, who is twice Elmer's size and soaking wet. The neighbor grabs the shotgun and ties the barrel around Elmer's head, then fires the gun before leaving.

Bugs then is seen in the patio area of the penthouse when Elmer tries to shoot him, but constantly misses. Bugs then asks if Elmer is trying to get rid of him and, when Elmer says that "rabbits don't belong in penthouses" accuses Elmer of thinking he is "better" than a rabbit and if Elmer can prove that he is better, Bugs will leave. Elmer accepts the challenge and Bugs fashions several contests around the penthouse that Elmer wins, but not before suffering large consequences. The first two events are a strength test and then a shooting test, both of which Bugs loses. He then says that there is one more event, the "jump test". Bugs fails his test, which involves jumping over an outdoor bench, and then sets up the bench for Elmer. However, Bugs positions the bench vertically and near the overlook of the penthouse so that when Elmer jumps over it, he is actually jumping off the edge of the building. Elmer flies over the edge and lands on the ground in a popcorn machine, and Bugs admits that Elmer is "a better man than I am, Doc, but only because I'm a rabbit" and then departs down the sidewalk with the flower that Elmer had dug up in the opening scene.

== Home media ==
A remastered version was available on HBO Max with the original opening and ending titles restored. However, in this version, about a second of audio is cut in the opening titles. This error was later corrected when the short was released on the Bugs Bunny 80th Anniversary Collection Blu-Ray in 2020.

Preceded by Forward March Hare	Bugs Bunny Cartoons; 1953	Succeeded by Southern Fried Rabbit
