= Snow Excuse =

- Directed by: Robert McKimson
- Story by: David Detiege
- Produced by: David H. DePatie; Friz Freleng
- Starring: Mel Blanc
- Edited by: Al Wahrman
- Music by: Bill Lava
- Animation by: George Grandpré; Bob Matz; Manny Perez; Don Williams; Norm McCabe
- Layouts by: Dick Ung
- Backgrounds by: Tom O'Loughlin
- Color process: Technicolor
- Production company: DePatie–Freleng Enterprises
- Distributed by: Warner Bros. Pictures; The Vitaphone Corporation
- Release date: May 21, 1966
- Running time: 6:20
- Language: English

Snow Excuse is a 1966 Warner Bros. Merrie Melodies cartoon directed by Robert McKimson. The short was released on May 21, 1966, and stars Daffy Duck and Speedy Gonzales.

In this film, Speedy tries to steal firewood from Daffy.

== Plot ==
Speedy Gonzales is freezing in his mountaintop cabin, and so asks Daffy Duck if he can borrow some firewood. The ever-greedy duck stubbornly refuses, prompting Speedy to steal some wood so he can survive. Ripostes on both sides are thrown:

1: Daffy attempts to move all his firewood indoors, but Speedy ambushes him and quickly steals a log.

2: Speedy sneaks in through a drainpipe. Daffy, having anticipated this, fires three bullets into the pipe, then runs to his fridge and opens it. When Speedy appears in the fridge, Daffy catches him with a baseball glove, but is then hit by the bullets he fired. Daffy then snarls "What a miserable mouse" as Speedy steals another log.

3: Speedy knocks on Daffy's door, threatening to break it down if he doesn't open it. However, Speedy is gone when Daffy opens it. Speedy attempts to run in through the back, but Daffy scares him off using a cat head. When he hears another knock on the door, he opens it and shoots his rifle, thinking it's Speedy again, only to discover that he has shot at a postman's feet. The postman retaliates by tying Daffy up with the gun and tearing up his post (cursing at him in "Mexican" gibberish all the while), allowing Speedy to take another log.

4: Speedy takes a plank off the wall of Daffy's hacienda and takes it to his cabin, but finds Daffy lying on it ("Greetings, mouse. Thanks for the sleigh ride.") He promptly sends it sliding back down the mountain again, crashing back into Daffy's hacienda ("This is getting monotonous...").

5: Speedy apparently sees Daffy placing all his wood outside and runs down the mountain to retrieve it, barely avoiding several mousetraps hidden in the snow. Daffy allows him to take the "wood", but Speedy discovers that it's actually chocolate-covered ice. Speedy promptly whacks Daffy's foot with one and steals another piece of the real wood. Daffy attempts to go after it, but gets himself caught up in all the remaining mousetraps ("What a revolting development - caught in my own trap...").

6: Speedy places a package at Daffy's door. Daffy angrily refuses it at first, but gives in to temptation. He finds a giant stick of dynamite and throws it away, but finds another one underneath, and more, successively smaller sticks underneath, like a Matryoshka doll, ending with a minuscule replica of the original. Daffy taunts Speedy, thinking it to be harmless, but the dynamite explodes powerfully, dazing him ("What do you know? A Jolly Red Giant. What else is new besides 'ho-ho-' [BOOM!] oooooh..."); long enough for Speedy to steal another log.

Having acquired as much wood as he needs, Speedy begins attempting to build a snowman. Daffy marches up the mountain to take revenge on Speedy, but Speedy accidentally drops a small snowball onto a teaspoon, sending a larger one down the mountain. The snowball crushes Daffy and smashes his hacienda into pieces.

Beaten and out of both firewood and home, Daffy disguises himself as a mouse and asks to lodge up with Speedy, who agrees. Shrugging, Daffy tells the audience, "I always say, if you can't beat 'em, join 'em." Iris out.
