= Fish Tales (film) =

1936 film by Jack King

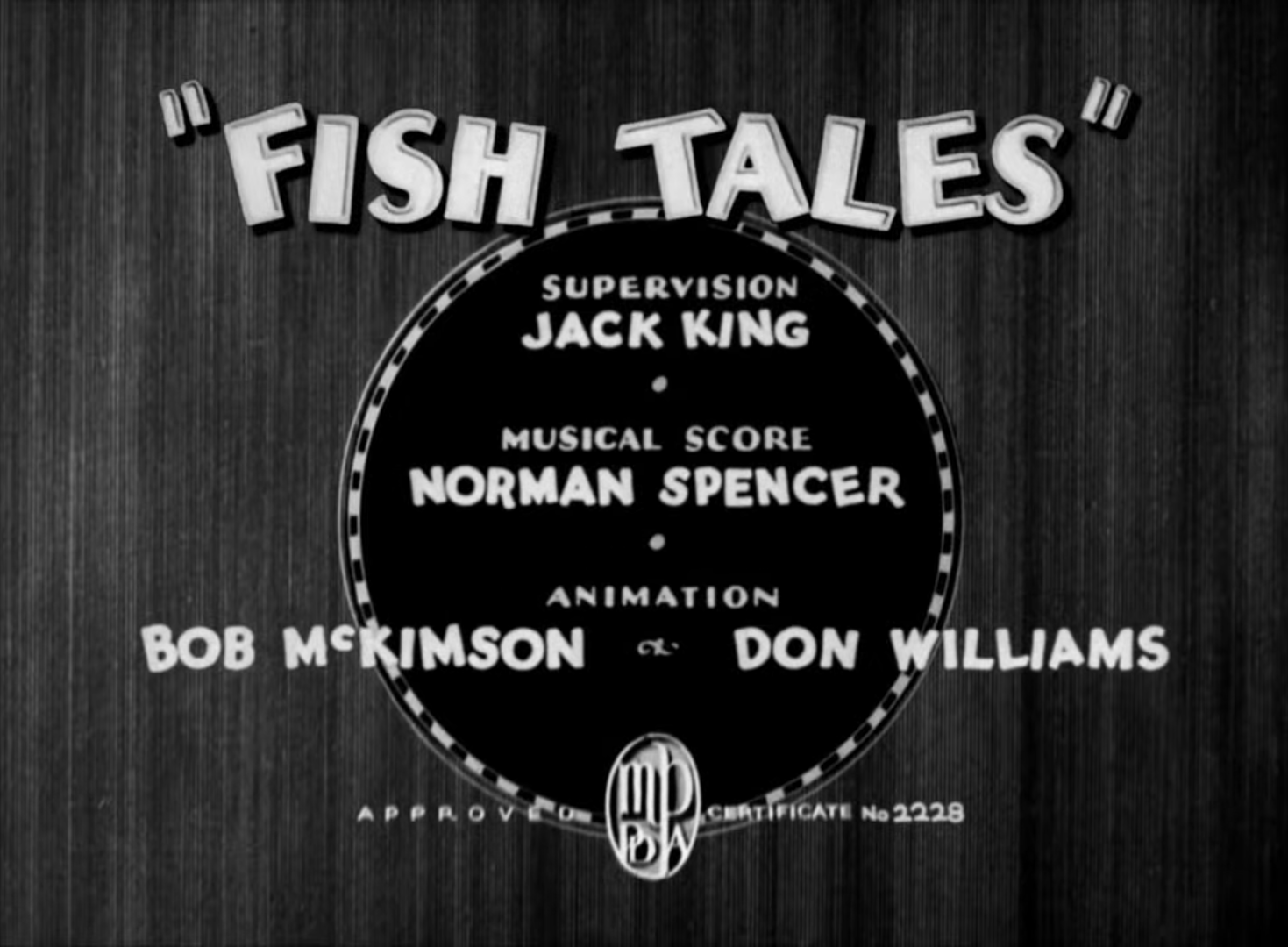
- Title card
- Directed by: Jack King
- Produced by: Leon Schlesinger
- Starring: Joe Dougherty
- Music by: Norman Spencer
- Animation by: Bob McKimson; Don Williams
- Color process: Black-and-white
- Production company: Leon Schlesinger Productions
- Distributed by: Warner Bros. Productions; The Vitaphone Corporation
- Release date: May 23, 1936
- Running time: 7 min
- Country: United States
- Language: English

Fish Tales is a 1936 American animated comedy short film directed by Jack King. The short was released on May 23, 1936. It is the 71st film in the Looney Tunes series and the eighth cartoon to feature Porky Pig.

== Plot ==
Porky Pig goes fishing. Two worms are attracted by his whistling, and he beckons the two worms to enter his can of bait. The male worm immediately jumps in, while the female worm tries to seduce Porky, only to be pulled in. Porky starts the engine in his motorboat and neglects to cut off the rope, causing him to be flung towards the ocean. He loses control of the boat and runs into a battleship, somehow moving around its outline underwater, before reversing course and running into the battleship, cutting a dining table used by sailors in half as the battleship sinks.

Porky manages to find the brake and brakes while he spins. He wakes up after he accidentally sucks in a fish into his nose and sneezes it out. He starts fishing, only to hook his boat which does a backflip. He first hooks up a severed fish head before hooking multiple fish at once. He feels exhausted and goes to sleep. In his dream, a fish hunter baits him with a donut and drags him below the ocean. He shows his catch to his wife and children, who are excited about the meal, but the children are scared of Porky's scared reaction. He is then stuffed with vegetables into a metal tray then baked in an oven, where the fire stops him from escaping.

Porky eventually escapes without the family noticing, but runs into an interested eel who chases him. Porky punches him into knotting its body, which it untangles angrily. They swim into a giant fish's mouth which spits them out after noticing the eel. Porky is then chased by a swordfish, who gets its bill stuck in a pillar and dented by Porky with a hammer. Porky is then spanked and strangled by an octopus until he wakes up naked and tangled in rope. Overwhelmed, he throws the fish into the water and sails home.

== Home media ==
Fish Tales is available on disc 1 of the Porky Pig 101 DVD set.

== See also ==
- Porky Pig filmography
- Looney Tunes and Merrie Melodies filmography (1930–1939)
