= Sandy Claws =

- Title card
- Directed by: I. Freleng
- Written by: Arthur Davis; Warren Foster
- Starring: Mel Blanc
- Music by: Carl Stalling
- Animation by: Virgil Ross; Arthur Davis; Manuel Perez
- Layouts by: Hawley Pratt
- Backgrounds by: Irv Wyner
- Color process: Technicolor
- Production company: Warner Bros. Cartoons
- Distributed by: Warner Bros. Pictures; The Vitaphone Corporation
- Release date: April 2, 1955
- Running time: 7:12
- Language: English

Sandy Claws is a Warner Bros. Looney Tunes cartoon directed by Friz Freleng, released on April 2, 1955, and starring Tweety, Sylvester and Granny. Voiceovers were performed by Mel Blanc and Bea Benaderet.

== Plot ==
Granny takes Tweety to the beach while expressing anticipation for trying on her new bikini bathing suit. Meanwhile, Sylvester, fishing on the pier, spots Tweety in his cage across the pier and unguarded. Thinking he's in for a free meal, Sylvester's plans are thwarted when the tide washes him away, leaving Tweety stranded.

Sylvester employs various tricks to reach Tweety, including lowering himself with a fishing line, driving a motorboat, using water skis, and inflating balloons as water wings, which attracts sharks. Eventually, Granny, mistaking Sylvester's actions for a rescue attempt, aids him.

After several mishaps, Tweety takes matters into his own hands, successfully rowing his cage ashore. Granny, focused on reuniting with Tweety, neglects Sylvester, who ends up in the dog pound due to her overzealous attempts to reward him.

== Production notes ==
Sandy Claws marked Bea Benaderet's last portrayal of Granny, subsequently succeeded by June Foray in later productions. Following this short's release, Granny underwent a comprehensive revamp. Her visual presentation and attire received updates, commencing with Red Riding Hoodwinked. Although her cheerful disposition persisted overall, her antiquated attributes, including her attire and detachment from contemporary trends, were toned down.

Sandy Claws was nominated for an Academy Award for Best Animated Short Film in 1954. It lost to UPA's When Magoo Flew.
