= Stop! Look! And Hasten! =

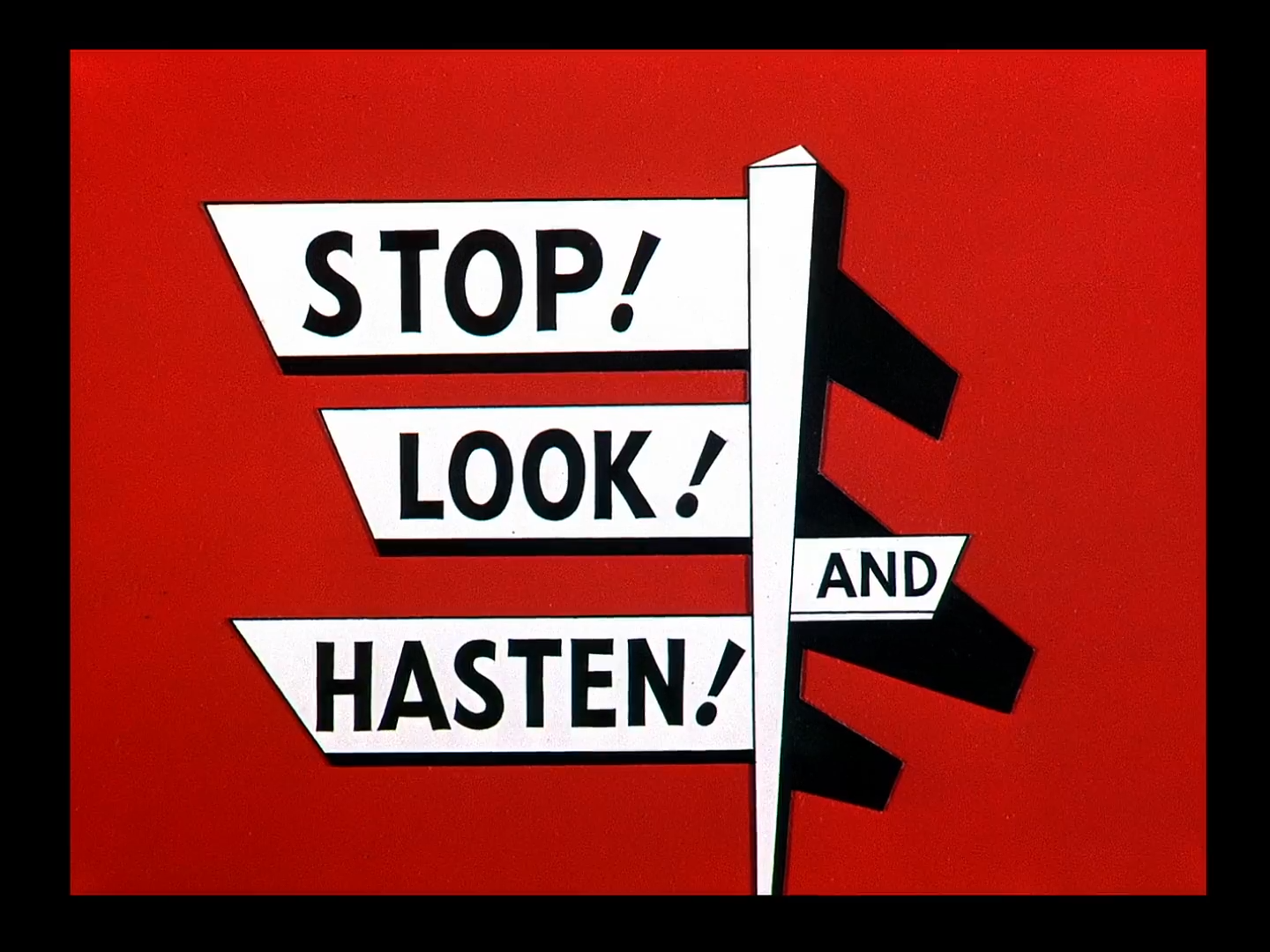
- Title card
- Directed by: Charles M. Jones
- Story by: Michael Maltese
- Music by: Carl Stalling
- Animation by: Abe Levitow; Richard Thompson; Harry Love (effects animation)
- Layouts by: Maurice Noble; Robert Gribbroek
- Backgrounds by: Phil De Guard
- Production company: Warner Bros. Cartoons
- Distributed by: Warner Bros. Pictures; The Vitaphone Corporation
- Release date: August 14, 1954
- Running time: 7 minutes 5 seconds
- Country: United States

Stop! Look! And Hasten! is a 1954 Warner Bros. Merrie Melodies cartoon, directed by Chuck Jones. The short was released on August 14, 1954, and stars Wile E. Coyote and the Road Runner. The title is a play on the railroad crossing safety phrase "stop, look, and listen". The cartoon has been featured in the film The Shining. Danny Torrance and his mother, Wendy Torrance, are seen watching this cartoon.

== Plot ==
Wile E. Coyote (Eatibus Anythingus), apparently famished, trudges across the desert floor, and eats a fly which was buzzing around him. He spots a tin can in the road, but finding nothing inside, eats the can itself before being flattened by the Road Runner (Hot-roddicus Supersonicus). The coyote chases the Road Runner to eat him. He plans a pulley, rope and rock trap to smash the passing Road Runner, but he instead smashes himself as the Road Runner stops and makes fun of him. Wile E. then uses a lasso to catch the bird, but instead gets a truck which pulls him across the hard ground. The coyote then builds a Burmese tiger trap, but instead gets a Burmese tiger (Surprisibus! Surprisibus!).

Next Wile E. constructs a massive pop-up grate in the middle of the road, which fails to block the Road Runner. He resumes the chase but is stopped at a railroad crossing. The Road Runner taunts the coyote as he slowly prances the tracks and his opponent is lifted into the air by the striped divider. Wile E. drops off and chases the Road Runner down the tracks, which run through mountains. The two pass by opposite lanes and the Road Runner signals the coyote, who stops cold after a few seconds and turns back... but too far again. He starts back the other way and soon finds the Road Runner is on a lower track than he is. They finally chase on the same track until a train stops the chase. The coyote dashes in and out of a rockface and sees a train pass by on a track underneath him. A second train approaches where he is standing from inside the rock. Wile holds up a sign indicating his doom.

Wile E. moves into a grooved pipe intending to set TNT underneath the road, but the detonator hangs up on a loose rock and blows him up. He then uses a fast motorcycle and starts to chase a passing Road Runner, but he slams into a tree. Wile E. next paints a white circle in the middle of a large suspension bridge and baits it with bird seed, then hides underneath to cut out the circle. Instead, he cuts out the rest of the bridge with him underneath it, leaving the Road Runner and the circle floating in midair calmly eating the bait. For the final attempt, Wile E. takes vitamins for speed. He burns rubber on the road, then dashes off fast enough to leave the highway on fire. The speedy chase continues until they pass by the cranked-up grate from earlier, which finally decides to raise itself in between the sprinters. Wile smashes into the grate, and the Road Runner brakes and views his hapless rival before burning more rubber on the road, spelling out "That's all, folks!" in smoke.

== See also ==
- Looney Tunes and Merrie Melodies filmography (1950–1959)
