= Gee Whiz-z-z-z-z-z-z =

- Title card
- Directed by: Charles M. Jones
- Story by: Michael Maltese
- Music by: Milt Franklyn; Carl Stalling (uncredited)
- Animation by: Ben Washam; Abe Levitow; Richard Thompson; Ken Harris
- Layouts by: Ernie Nordli
- Backgrounds by: Philip DeGuard
- Color process: Technicolor
- Production company: Warner Bros. Cartoons
- Distributed by: Warner Bros. Pictures
- Release date: May 5, 1956
- Running time: 6:36
- Country: United States
- Language: English

Gee Whiz-z-z-z-z-z-z is a 1956 Warner Bros. Looney Tunes cartoon directed by Chuck Jones. The short was released on May 5, 1956, and stars Wile E. Coyote and the Road Runner.

== Plot ==
Wile. E Coyote sporting his Acme Bat-Man's Outfit in Gee Whiz-z-z-z-z-z-z.

The cartoon begins with the title sign and Wile E. Coyote hiding behind it, before the Road Runner speeding past. As he comes by, the Coyote runs right after him but gets hit by a truck (with the card on which the main producers of the cartoon are shown), and at just the moment Wile E. is hit, a box falls on him with Charles M. Jones' name. The Coyote angrily throws the box away and his mock Binomial nomenclature in Dog Latin (Eatius Birdius) is shown. He runs right again after Road Runner (Delicius-Delicius), but the speedy bird takes a rectangular U-turn, and the Coyote runs through the smoke and stops midway, wondering where the Road Runner went. The Road Runner speeds through the plateau roads in the background and right next to the away-looking Coyote, beeps at him and runs away again. Wile E. holds up two signs saying "EGAD" and two exclamation marks; before dropping them, he sits on the ground and plans his schemes.

1. Hiding in a manhole, the Coyote pops out and fires a rifle at the bird. The bullet eventually runs behind the Road Runner, but doesn't hit the bird, even the bird mockingly turns around and beeps on it, then speeds away. The bullet loses its track (brakes in midair and shows question and exclamation marks) and falls on the ground. When the angry Coyote picks it up, it explodes.

2. The next scene shows the annoyed Coyote walking back and forth, but he already came up with his plan. In another attempt, Wile E. leaps out into the road with "1 sheet ACME Triple Strength BATTLESHIP STEEL ARMOR PLATE" in front of him; even this cannot stop the Road Runner from barreling through it. The Coyote looks puzzled and even checks his body to see if the bird ran through it too. As he sees the result, such as the background where he should logically see parts of his own body, he nervously walks away with the plate.

3. While the Road Runner is feasting on some dirt nearby the road, the Coyote puts a lighted stick of dynamite on the end of a fishing line and casts it out. However, it misses the Road Runner, rolls under a huge boulder, then explodes. The explosion causes the boulder to fly over the target and crush the Coyote.

4. Wile E., sporting an Acme Bat-Man's Outfit, dives off a cliff, attempting to fly. At first, he isn't successful, but he eventually learns the moves. However, when he looks at the camera, he crashes into a huge rock face, and the wings from the costume get torn away and stuck on the rock. The Coyote tries to stay in the air with the damaged costume, but he only succeeds in falling.

5. After that debacle, he perches himself upon a high branch with an anvil attached to the end of an ACME Rubber Band. He tries to keep himself on the branch with his legs, but the anvil stretches the greatly elastic rubber band so much that he falls through the road with the anvil. The rubber band then throws the Coyote out from the hole and he hits his head right in the branch.

6. The Coyote tries attaching a stick of dynamite to a telescoping spring, and he tests the device successfully. But as he attempts to use it on the Road Runner, now with the dynamite lighted, the spring retracts backwards and sends the Coyote right through a rock wall, after which the spring shrinks and sends the dynamite into the wall as well, which explodes. The Coyote stands charred with the broken device in his hand in the middle of the walls.

7. In the next attempt, Wile E. paints a landscape of a broken bridge on a stone wall, which he already displayed with a STOP! BRIDGE OUT sign. The running-by Road Runner rams through the painting, predictably angering the Coyote, for whom the painting activates, and he falls into the deep pit he painted. (The situation is quite the contrary of the painting attempt used in the episode Going! Going! Gosh!)

8. The next attempt is to blow up a bridge with explosives. Wile E. tries to activate the detonator as the Road Runner comes by, but the detonator won't go off. He vainly tries jumping on it and smashing it into the ground before angrily speeding up after the Road Runner. Unfortunately, the detonator finally goes off, thus blowing up the TNT under the bridge where the Coyote is.

9. In the last attempt, the Coyote crafts a makeshift jet bike made from a jet motor and handlebars. With his high-speed vehicle, he quickly follows the Road Runner just one mile behind the bird. However, when the duo arrives at a cliff, the Road Runner, as previously shown, takes his U-turn and the Coyote goes right past his smoke. As he notices his missed target, he angrily switches off his motor, waiting for it to arrive at the other cliff. The Road Runner arrives on the other end of the cliff and the Coyote doesn't reach the end of the cliff. As the Road Runner beeps to greet his nemesis, the Coyote angrily jumps at the bird, but he points to the ground and gravity enables, thus the Coyote falls down with his jet bike. In the end, as he starts to fall down to the ground, he holds a sign saying asking for a favor, "How about ending this cartoon before I hit?" His wish is granted, and as the cartoon irises out, he holds another sign saying, "Thank you."

== See also ==
- Looney Tunes and Merrie Melodies filmography (1950–1959)
