= Boston Quackie =

1957 film by Robert McKimson

- Title card
- Directed by: Robert McKimson
- Story by: Tedd Pierce
- Starring: Mel Blanc
- Edited by: Treg Brown
- Music by: Milt Franklyn
- Animation by: Ted Bonnicksen; Keith Darling; Russ Dyson; George Grandpré
- Layouts by: Robert Gribbroek
- Backgrounds by: Bob Majors
- Color process: Technicolor
- Production company: Warner Bros. Cartoons
- Distributed by: Warner Bros. Pictures; The Vitaphone Corporation
- Release date: June 22, 1957 (USA)
- Running time: 7 min (one reel)
- Language: English

Boston Quackie is a 1957 Warner Bros. Looney Tunes short directed by Robert McKimson. The short was released on June 22, 1957, and stars Daffy Duck and Porky Pig. The cartoon and its title are a parody of the character Boston Blackie.

The film is a spy comedy, featuring a secret agent who has to recover a stolen attaché case.

== Plot ==
Secret agent Boston Quackie embarks on a mission to deliver a crucial attaché case to the Slobovian consulate in West Slobovia, facing relentless attempts by spies to seize it. The pursuit unfolds aboard the Cloak & Dagger Express, where Quackie confronts a mysterious man with a green hat, suspected of theft.

Despite various encounters and a brief capture, Quackie ultimately outwits the thief with assistance from Mary and Inspector Faraway. Upon delivering the case to the consulate, Quackie is surprised to discover its seemingly mundane contents — a jar of instant coffee. However, to his amazement, the jar contains a surprise: a glamorous woman intended as an escort for an embassy ball.

== Home media ==
This short is available on disc 1 of the Looney Tunes Collector's Vault: Volume 2 Blu-ray set.

== See also ==
- List of American films of 1957
- List of Daffy Duck cartoons
