= Forward March Hare =

- Title card
- Directed by: Charles M. Jones
- Story by: Michael Maltese
- Starring: Mel Blanc; John T. Smith (uncredited)
- Music by: Carl Stalling
- Animation by: Ken Harris; Lloyd Vaughan; Ben Washam
- Layouts by: Maurice Noble
- Backgrounds by: Philip De Guard
- Color process: Technicolor
- Production company: Warner Bros. Cartoons
- Distributed by: Warner Bros. Pictures; The Vitaphone Corporation
- Release date: February 14, 1953 (U.S.)
- Running time: 7:10
- Language: English

Forward March Hare is a 1952 Warner Bros. Looney Tunes cartoon directed by Chuck Jones. The short was released on February 14, 1953, and stars Bugs Bunny.

== Plot ==
Bugs Bunny mistakenly receives a draft notice addressed to "B. Bonny," leading him to believe he has been drafted into the United States Army.

Upon arrival at the induction center, Bugs's participation elicits bemusement and incredulity from fellow recruits and military personnel alike. His exaggerated physical attributes, typified by oversized shoes and ears, contribute to a series of humorous encounters, including an unintentional bowling incident and a disruptive encounter with his drill sergeant.

Despite his earnest intentions, Bugs's unconventional approach to military life results in a succession of mishaps and disciplinary actions, leading to demotions in rank and additional duties. Bugs's unorthodox methods, such as adorning chickens in tuxedos and utilizing ammunition shells as makeshift tools, perpetuate chaos within the military barracks.

Bugs's true identity as a rabbit becomes apparent to his superiors, prompting an official apology and clarification regarding his ineligibility for military service. Nevertheless, Bugs demonstrates a willingness to contribute to the war effort, embracing a role in testing ammunition shells with characteristic humor and resilience.

== Home media ==
This cartoon is available on the Stars of Space Jam: Bugs Bunny VHS, and Looney Tunes Golden Collection: Volume 4.

Preceded by Hare Lift	Bugs Bunny Cartoons; 1953	Succeeded by Upswept Hare
