= To Beep or Not to Beep =

- Title card
- Directed by: Chuck Jones; Maurice Noble (co-director)
- Story by: John Dunn; Chuck Jones
- Edited by: Treg Brown
- Music by: Bill Lava
- Animation by: Richard Thompson; Bob Bransford; Tom Ray; Ken Harris; Harry Love (effects animation)
- Backgrounds by: Philip DeGuard
- Color process: Technicolor
- Production company: Warner Bros. Cartoons
- Distributed by: Warner Bros. Pictures
- Release date: December 28, 1963 (USA)
- Running time: 6 minutes

To Beep or Not to Beep is a Merrie Melodies animated short starring Wile E. Coyote and the Road Runner. Released on December 28, 1963, the cartoon was written by Chuck Jones, John Dunn, Michael Maltese (albeit uncredited), and directed by Jones, Maurice Noble and Tom Ray were the co-directors (albeit the latter is left uncredited). This is the penultimate Road Runner/Wile E. Coyote short that Chuck Jones directed at Warner Bros. during the original "classic" era. This is also the final Warner Bros. cartoon released in 1963.

The title is a play on the famous line in William Shakespeare's play Hamlet. This installment of the Coyote-Road Runner series marked the first time that no Latin-esque terms are used to indicate who each character is.

Almost all of the footage was originally made as part of a 1962 television pilot named Adventures of the Road Runner. The pilot was rejected by ABC, and several gags from the short were rearranged into this cartoon in a cost-cutting measure (a similar practice was used in the Three Stooges two-reelers of the mid-to-late 1950s). A whole new soundtrack was crafted by musician Bill Lava and editor Treg Brown.

== Plot ==
Screenshot of the short featuring Wile E. Coyote and the Road Runner

The opening scene shows Wile E. Coyote reading a "Western Cookery" recipe book. Completely unaware that his prey has zoomed up behind him, he slurps at the prospect of a road-runner banquet featuring "Road Runner Surprise", and gets answered by another slurp. Turning to find himself nose-to-beak with the Road Runner, Coyote gives himself a real headache responding to a startling "BEEP-BEEP!" from point-blank range.

1. Coyote places a lasso in the road, and pulls back on hearing his prey, but he misses and falls off the cliff behind him. The end of the lasso latches onto a loose rock on another outcropping as he passes it. Thinking the rock will be heavy enough to support him and prevent the impact, Coyote ties his end of the lasso around his waist, but doesn't realize that the rope is too long before hitting the ground at full force. Still dazed by the impact, Coyote pulls on the lasso and dislodges the rock, which drops on him and leaves his form like a deflated accordion as he walks away.

2. In a later chase, the Road Runner goes supersonic and rockets away, causing several saguaro cacti to uproot in his slipstream (stylized ocotillo are also seen but they don't uproot). Cacti continue to follow the Road Runner across the landscape, and Coyote chases until he sees that a bridge has retracted due to the bird's trajectory. Coyote falls through the ravine, followed by one of the slower cacti that did not make it past the bridge, causing him to leap yelling in pain up to the top of the ravine like a rocket.

3. Not having learned from previous uses of this device, Coyote attaches a spring to a loose rock and tries to shoot himself toward the Road Runner, but instead the rock is thrown backwards and it continues to pull Coyote back like a Newton's cradle until the rock hurtles over the edge of a cliff. Coyote manages to grab onto the brink and stay put, until the rock flies back the way it came, taking out the entire outcropping and throwing Coyote across the desert. The two rocks finally detach themselves, but this leads to the broken outcropping forming a teeterboard, with Coyote lying on one end and the big rock landing on the other side. This catapults Coyote, until he falls through a narrow canyon with the rock directly on top, leading to the spring retracting and Coyote being harnessed directly underneath. By loosening the harness, Coyote escapes, only to find that he's far above the canyon floor.

4. Awaiting the Road Runner inside a crane, Coyote pulls up a wrecking ball. However, he pulls too far and takes crushing consequences. The Road Runner races past a trapped Coyote.

5. The final segment features six attempts to flatten the Road Runner with a boulder hurled by a catapult. Unfortunately for Coyote, the catapult finds multiple ways to malfunction, resulting in Coyote getting pancaked each time.

Attempt 1: Coyote stands behind the catapult. The boulder simply falls on Coyote when it is released, due to its weight being too much for the catapult to handle.

Attempt 2: Coyote stands in front of the catapult and gets smashed due to his location.

Attempt 3: Having learned from the first two, Coyote stands well out of the way of the catapult, out of range, to make the first attempt's failure impossible. However, the catapult flips itself over and squashes its user.

Attempt 4: Coyote stands to the side and releases the boulder, which is punched up into the air, and unfortunately falls in the wrong direction - toward Coyote.

Attempt 5: Having been smashed every time in some way or another, Coyote hides underneath the catapult itself when he releases the string. However, the entire catapult falls apart and collapses on top of Coyote, with the boulder landing like a big "cherry on the cake."

Attempt 6: This time, Coyote hides inside a manhole while he releases the string. However, the catapult jams and the arm does not throw the boulder. Coyote tries to fix the problem by prodding the catapult's body first, then shaking it violently (and immediately diving back into his manhole after each attempt to avoid injury), but nothing happens. Getting very impatient, Coyote lodges himself between the arm and the body and stands up, then climbs the arm and stomps on it, again to no avail. Sliding down to the rock, he tries to pry it free from the arm. The catapult finally unjams, something that Wile E. initially fails to notice (as he is still trying to pry the rock free) until he sees a large rock formation ahead of him. Coyote is flattened as his rock flies through the formation, having taken a slice of that with it then falling off. A network of utility lines captures Coyote and slings him all the way back to the top of the catapult's arm, which plops him on the ground to be smashed once and for all by the boulder.

After that final disaster, the audience discovers the reason for the catapult's "artificial intelligence". The camera zooms in towards the manufacturer's nameplate and reveals that the catapult had been built, not by ACME, but by the "Road-Runner Manufacturing Company — Phoenix * Taos * Santa Fe * Flagstaff". The Road Runner on the nameplate then comes to life, gives the audience a "Beep-Beep" and then zooms off.

== Crew ==
- Co-Directors: Maurice Noble & Tom Ray
- Story: John Dunn & Michael Maltese
- Animation: Richard Thompson, Bob Bransford, Tom Ray, & Ken Harris
- Design: Maurice Noble
- Layouts: Maurice Noble
- Backgrounds: Philip DeGuard
- Effects Animation: Harry Love
- Film Editor: Treg Brown
- Voice Characterizations: Mel Blanc & Paul Julian
- Music: Bill Lava
- Produced by David H. DePatie
- Written and Directed by Chuck Jones

== Home media ==
This short can be found on Looney Tunes Golden Collection: Volume 3 and Looney Tunes Collector's Vault: Volume 2.
