= Zoom and Bored =

- Title card
- Directed by: Chuck Jones
- Story by: Michael Maltese
- Edited by: Treg Brown
- Music by: Milt Franklyn; Carl Stalling
- Animation by: Ken Harris; Abe Levitow; Richard Thompson; Corny Cole (uncredited)
- Layouts by: Maurice Noble
- Backgrounds by: Philip DeGuard
- Color process: Technicolor
- Production company: Warner Bros. Cartoons
- Distributed by: Warner Bros. Pictures; The Vitaphone Corporation
- Release date: September 14, 1957
- Running time: 6 minutes 16 seconds
- Country: United States
- Language: English

Zoom and Bored is a 1957 Warner Bros. Merrie Melodies cartoon directed by Chuck Jones, released on September 14, 1957, starring Wile E. Coyote and the Road Runner. The title is a play on room and board, just like the Sylvester and Tweety short Room and Bird. This is one of the few shorts where the Road Runner shows a soft side for Wile E. Coyote and spares him.

== Plot ==
After the Road Runner (Birdibus Zippibus) runs him off a cliff, Wile E. Coyote (Famishus Vulgaris) studies a book called The Art of Road Runner Trapping for some new ideas. First, he tries to dig a hole in the road, but cannot successfully handle a jackhammer, he vibrates from this effect and he tears the books. Other attempted traps include a brick wall, he sees his rear end and decides to use a dynamite to blow up his doppelganger's rear, only to realize his mistake because that rear belong to him, which causes him to leap into the air and then fall down in a burning pain; and a plate of birdseed attached to a beehive, despite being close to the Road Runner, the bees stings Coyote again and again. The fourth gag is an anvil to squash the flightless bird who is eating the birdseed. Predictably, an anvil is very heavy and it causes the board to break and land on the road which the Road Runner takes a step aside and when the board covered the hole, the Road Runner continues to eat his second lunch. Now seeing this fails, Coyote builds a ramp with a bomb at the top so it would roll down and blow up the bird, but for some reason, before he can have a chance to light up the bomb, it instantly explodes. The sixth trap is a catapult so when it is launched, the boulder would crush the bird, but the boulder is extremely heavy that it ended up crushing Coyote. The final attempt is harpoon gun with a rope on one end, but Coyote sees his foot getting caught in the rope before dragging him into cactus and under some rocks. He unzips this, but he quickly grabs the rope before he could fall, however, the rope launches into a pipe and then he gets hit by a truck and a train. After Coyote's traumatizing experience with the harpoon, he breaks down in tears. The Road Runner zips up behind Coyote, but doesn't have the heart to beep at him at that time. He then zips away as the cartoon ends.

== Music ==
The music is Dance of the Comedians from The Bartered Bride by Bedrich Smetana.

== See also ==
- Looney Tunes and Merrie Melodies filmography (1950–1959)
