= Zip 'N Snort =

- Title card
- Directed by: Chuck Jones
- Story by: Chuck Jones
- Starring: Mel Blanc; Paul Julian
- Edited by: Treg Brown
- Music by: Milt Franklyn
- Animation by: Bob Bransford; Ken Harris; Tom Ray; Richard Thompson
- Layouts by: Maurice Noble
- Backgrounds by: Philip DeGuard
- Color process: Technicolor
- Production company: Warner Bros. Cartoons
- Distributed by: Warner Bros. Pictures; The Vitaphone Corporation
- Release date: January 21, 1961
- Running time: 6 minutes
- Country: United States

Zip 'n' Snort is a 1961 Warner Bros. Merrie Melodies cartoon written and directed by Chuck Jones. The short was released on January 21, 1961, and stars Wile E. Coyote and the Road Runner.

== Plot ==
Wile E. Coyote (Evereadii Eatibus) encounters the mischievous Road Runner (Digoutis-Hot-Rodis), setting the stage for their iconic chase. In a series of comedic misfortunes, Coyote devises elaborate schemes to capture his elusive prey, only to face the consequences of his own traps.

Initially, Coyote's attempts are straightforward, such as loading himself into a bow, but they invariably lead to his own downfall. As he escalates his tactics, using grenades, model airplanes, and cannons, each plan backfires spectacularly, leaving him battered but undeterred. In a desperate move, Coyote greases his feet to glide across a mountaintop, but ends up impaled on a saguaro cactus, and eventually careening down a mountainside, surfing power lines, and ends up surfing a railway track, where he narrowly avoids a train, and eventually hurtles into a tunnel where he gets chased by a train marked New York Express Nonstop, with Road Runner revealed to be the operator of said train.

== Crew ==
- Story: Chuck Jones
- Animation: Richard Thompson, Bob Bransford, Tom Ray and Ken Harris
- Layouts: Maurice Noble
- Backgrounds: Philip DeGuard
- Film Editor: Treg Brown
- Voice Characterizations: Mel Blanc and Paul Julian
- Music: Milt Franklyn
- Produced by John Burton, Sr.
- Directed by Chuck Jones

== Home media ==
This short is available on disc 1 of the Looney Tunes Collector's Vault: Volume 1 Blu-ray set.
