= List of Toon In with Me episodes (2021) =

This is a list of episodes of the American live-action/animated anthology comedy television series Toon In with Me that aired on MeTV in 2021.

== Episodes ==
No. overall	No. in year	Title	Original release date
0	0	"MeTV's Cartoon Kick-Off Show"	January 1, 2021
Bill and Toony preview their new show and some of their best cartoons. Two different versions were aired. Featured cartoons: What's Opera, Doc? (1957), The Screwy Truant (1945), One Froggy Evening (1955), Northwest Hounded Police (1946), Customers Wanted (1939), Duck Amuck (1953) (Friday, January 1, 2021); Featured cartoons: Rabbit Seasoning (1952), Bad Luck Blackie (1949), Duck Dodgers in the 24½th Century (1953), Daredevil Droopy (1951), The Cat Concerto (1947), What's Up, Doc? (1950) (Saturday, January 2, 2021)
1	1	"Meet the Tooners"	January 4, 2021
Bill welcomes the audience to the studio and presents his favorite cartoons, all while trying to put Toony on a diet. Featured cartoons: Beanstalk Bunny (1955), Little Rural Riding Hood (1949), Vim, Vigor and Vitaliky (1936), Ah, Sweet Mouse-Story of Life (1965), Walky Talky Hawky (1946)
2	2	"Bill and Toony's Bad Luck"	January 5, 2021
Bill starts experiencing bouts of bad luck after walking under a ladder, leaving Toony, Goldie and Mr. Quizzer to come up with ways to reverse his curse. Featured cartoons: Bowery Bugs (1949), Bad Luck Blackie (1949), Leave Well Enough Alone (1939), Big Game Haunt (1968), The Dog House (1952)
3	3	"Super Second Stringer Day"	January 6, 2021
Bill decides to shake things up by showing cartoons starring secondary characters. Featured cartoons: Really Scent (1959), Happy-Go-Nutty (1944), Rabbit's Feat (1960), The Unwelcome Guest (1945), A Mutt in a Rut (1959)
4	4	"What's a Cartoon?"	January 7, 2021
When Bill gets amnesia and forgets what a cartoon is, Toony tries to help him remember by showing him some examples of what can be possible in a cartoon. Featured cartoons: Rabbit Rampage (1955), A Cartoonist's Nightmare (1935), The Tom and Jerry Cartoon Kit (1962), The Film Fan (1939), Box-Office Bunny (1991)
5	5	"Fear of Flying"	January 8, 2021
Bill is set to travel to a convention for TV hosts, but he has a fear of flying, so Toony shows him some flight-themed cartoons to help him overcome his phobia. Featured cartoons: Hare Lift (1952), Little Johnny Jet (1953), Hot Air Aces (1949), The Flying Cat (1952), The Jet Cage (1962)
6	6	"Sock It to Me"	January 11, 2021
Today's show presents cartoons that introduced new characters, while Bill, Goldie and Mr. Quizzer show how easy it is to create a new character by making some out of socks and paper bags, to Toony's annoyance. Includes a cameo appearance by Svengoolie (Rich Koz). Featured cartoons: Devil May Hare (1954), Pip-eye, Pup-eye, Poop-eye an' Peep-eye (1942), The Abominable Snow Rabbit (1961), Jerry's Cousin (1951), Hobo Bobo (1947)
7	7	"Today's Episode Bites"	January 12, 2021
Today's show is all about teeth, and while Toony grapples with the revelation that tunas have teeth, Bill introduces cartoons with tooth-related gags. Featured cartoons: The Wacky Wabbit (1942), Hook, Line and Stinker (1958), The Super Snooper (1952), Lumberjack and Jill (1949), Canned Feud (1951)
8	8	"Opposite Day"	January 13, 2021
Bill worries when his friends start acting strangely; Toony is being nice and doesn't want to eat donuts, Mr. Quizzer decides to quit being a game show host, and Goldie is interested in getting to knowing him. Featured cartoons: Rabbit Fire (1951), Jerry's Diary (1949), Droopy's Double Trouble (1951), Gopher Spinach (1954), Road Runner a Go-Go (1965)
9	9	"All Rhyme, No Reason"	January 14, 2021
Bill, Toony and their friends attempt to break the world rhyming record, which includes making a rap video. Featured cartoons: What's Opera, Doc? (1957), Thumb Fun (1952), Rock 'n' Rodent (1967), We Aim to Please (1934), All Fowled Up (1955)
10	10	"Enfermos Communication"	January 15, 2021
Toony overhears Bill talking on the phone about replacing his car, and he mistakenly believes that Bill wants to get rid of him. Featured cartoons: One Froggy Evening (1955), Little Red Riding Rabbit (1944), Duel Personality (1966), The Spinach Roadster (1936), Hopalong Casualty (1960)
11	11	"Bill the Pirate"	January 18, 2021
Bill starts acting like a pirate after poking himself in the eye with a knitting needle. Featured cartoons: Buccaneer Bunny (1948), Moby Duck (1965), Spooky Swabs (1957), Dicky Moe (1962), The Mouse on 57th Street (1961)
12	12	"Toony's Laugh Track"	January 19, 2021
Toony decides to punctuate everything he says with a laugh track app. Featured cartoons: Robin Hood Daffy (1958), A Tale of Two Kitties (1942), Just Plane Beep (1965), Nearlyweds (1957), Puss 'n' Boats (1966)
13	13	"The New Sound Woman"	January 20, 2021
Goldie appoints her nervous niece, Soundra Perator, to be the show's new sound operator, resulting in odd sound effects during Bill and Toony's farm-themed show. Featured cartoons: Duck Amuck (1953), Fish and Slips (1962), Spree Lunch (1957), The Cat's Me-Ouch (1965), Little Boy Boo (1954)
14	14	"Bill and Toony Are Unprepared"	January 21, 2021
Bill and Toony have been up all night playing tic-tac-toe and are unprepared for today's show, so they turn to MeTV's resident tree-hugger, Lorna Greene, for advice on recycling content. Featured cartoons: False Hare (1964), Blue Cat Blues (1956), Hospitaliky (1937), One Droopy Knight (1957), A Sheep in the Deep (1962)
15	15	"Bill Finds the User's Manual"	January 22, 2021
When Bill's trusty "clicker" runs out of batteries, he looks into the user's manual and discovers all the other amazing things it can do. Featured cartoons: Hare-Way to the Stars (1958), Advance and Be Mechanized (1967), A Great Big Bunch of You (1932), Insect to Injury (1956), The Solid Tin Coyote (1966)
16	16	"When Jimmy Met Mabel"	January 25, 2021
When Bill tells Toony that he was hypnotized to kick his nail-biting habit, Toony correctly guesses his trigger word ("sarsaparilla") and accidentally regresses him into one of his past lives, a British thief named Jimmy the Slice. Things get crazier when Toony regresses Goldie into her past life as Jimmy's wife, Mousecatcher Mabel. Includes a cameo appearance by Svengoolie (Rich Koz). Featured cartoons: The Hare-Brained Hypnotist (1942), Matinee Mouse (1966), Pied Piper Porky (1939), Out to Punch (1956), A Bird in a Bonnet (1958)
17	17	"Scout of Sorts"	January 26, 2021
Toony joins the Gill Scouts and tries to earn some merit badges with help from his friends. Featured cartoons: Backwoods Bunny (1959), Cruise Cat (1952), Baby Wants a Bottleship (1942), Daffy's Diner (1967), D' Fightin' Ones (1961)
18	18	"Bill Loses His Hat"	January 27, 2021
Bill misplaces his favorite ball cap and his friends, as well as detectives Abouttoretire and Newtotheforce, try to help him find it. Featured cartoons: From Hare to Heir (1960), Much Ado About Nutting (1953), Corn on the Cop (1965), Bad Day at Cat Rock (1965), Olive's $weep$take Ticket (1941)
19	19	"Mascot Monthly"	January 28, 2021
Toony is jealous that Svengoolie's mascot Kerwyn is named "Mascot of the Year" by Mascot Monthly, leading to a series of cartoons featuring famous rivalries. Featured cartoons: A Star is Bored (1956), Hip Hip-Hurry! (1958), Let's You and Him Fight (1934), Ain't She Tweet (1952), Ah, Sweet Mouse-Story of Life (1965)
20	20	"Shock Jock"	January 29, 2021
The show gets retooled into a "morning zoo" radio show, and Bill becomes a shock jock named Simon Shock. Featured cartoons: Hare Conditioned (1945), That's My Mommy (1955), Be Kind to 'Aminals' (1935), Muzzle Tough (1954), The Ducksters (1950)
21	21	"Two Drink Minimum at the Cackle Barrel"	February 1, 2021
Toony and Bill turn the studio into a comedy club. Featured cartoons: Show Biz Bugs (1957), Symphony in Spinach (1948), Purr-Chance to Dream (1967), Out and Out Rout (1966), Dog Pounded (1954)
22	22	"Toony Can't Swim Because of the 20 Minute Rule"	February 2, 2021
Although he's a fish, Toony claims he can't swim because he just ate. Featured cartoons: Aqua Duck (1963), Porky's Poor Fish (1940), Filet Meow (1966), Weasel Stop (1956), Clippety Clobbered (1966)
23	23	"Whose TV?"	February 3, 2021
Toony, Goldie, and Quizzer try to pitch their TV show ideas to MeTV management. Featured cartoons: The Million Hare (1963), Pecos Pest (1955), Parlez Vous Woo (1956), Mouse Warming (1952), The Foghorn Leghorn (1948)
24	24	"Self-Care for Toony"	February 4, 2021
Toony decides to de-stress by having a spa day. Featured cartoons: Compressed Hare (1961), Assault and Flattery (1956), Daffy's Inn Trouble (1961), Grin and Share It (1957), The Slick Chick (1962); Note: This episode ends with a special message from Gilligan's Island actress Dawn Wells, who passed away shortly before the show premiered.
25	25	"Bill & Toony in Black & White"	February 5, 2021
The studio runs out of ink, forcing Bill and Toony to solve a mystery in black and white. Featured cartoons: Naughty Neighbors (1939), The Great Piggy Bank Robbery (1946), Catty Cornered (1953), Private Eye Popeye (1954), Ready, Woolen and Able (1960)
26	26	"Toony Wants to Be an Action Figure"	February 8, 2021
Bill awaits the arrival of his new action figure, which isn't exactly a spitting image, while Toony desires to have one made of himself. Featured cartoons: The Old Grey Hare (1944), Strangled Eggs (1961), Hello How Am I (1939), Tom-ic Energy (1965), A Pizza Tweety Pie (1958)
27	27	"Oh Canada?"	February 9, 2021
Bill and Toony host a tribute to Canada, with an appearance by Goldie's Canadian cousin, Goalie Fisher. Featured cartoons: Bonanza Bunny (1959), Snowman's Land (1939), I-ski Love-ski You-ski (1936), Weasel While You Work (1958), Alpine Antics (1936)
28	28	"Family Affairs"	February 10, 2021
For their anniversary, Bill invites his parents onto the show. Featured cartoons: Bedevilled Rabbit (1957), Cats A-Weigh! (1953), My Pop, My Pop (1940), Cat Feud (1958), Mother Was a Rooster (1962)
29	29	"Gamblin' Toony"	February 11, 2021
Toony loses money betting on a seahorse race, and now he's being menaced by gangsters for the clams he owes them. Featured cartoons: Bugs and Thugs (1954), Beep Prepared (1961), Floor Flusher (1954), Early to Bet (1951), Southbound Duckling (1955)
30	30	"Valentine's Day Episode"	February 12, 2021
Romance is in the air during Valentine's Day as Bill, Toony and Mr. Quizzer find love with the help of Cupid. Featured cartoons: The Stupid Cupid (1944), Don't Look Now (1936), Hold the Wire (1936), Rabbit Romeo (1957), Eatin' on the Cuff or The Moth Who Came to Dinner (1942)
31	31	"A President's Day Zach-tacular"	February 15, 2021
In honor of Presidents Day, Bill attempts to host a tribute to Zachary Taylor. Featured cartoons: Popeye for President (1956), Ballot Box Bunny (1951), Tom's Photo Finish (1957), The Candid Candidate (1937), A Fractured Leghorn (1950)
32	32	"Hazardous Henry"	February 16, 2021
Bill remembers his child star days from the fictional TV show Hazardous Henry. Featured cartoons: Hot Cross Bunny (1948), Puttin' on the Dog (1944), Females is Fickle (1940), Symphony in Slang (1951), Trip for Tat (1960); Note: First appearance of Felton Fanboy.
33	33	"Drumroll, Please!"	February 17, 2021
Bill and Goldie have major announcements to make, causing two drumrolls to play throughout the entire show. Featured cartoons: Bewitched Bunny (1954), Busy Buddies (1956), Tree for Two (1952), Betty Boop's Crazy Inventions (1933), Of Rice and Hen (1953)
34	34	"The Kahuna's Birthday Poem"	February 18, 2021
Bill and the gang put together a video poem to celebrate their boss's birthday, only to have random mishaps mess up their voices. Featured cartoons: Rabbit of Seville (1950), Hic-cup Pup (1954), Porky's Pastry Pirates (1942), Hawaiian Aye Aye (1964), Popeye Presents Eugene the Jeep (1940)
35	35	"Cap'n Bill and His Sea Pals"	February 19, 2021
As a tribute to the morning cartoon shows of the past, Bill plays a tape of the one he used to watch as a kid. Featured cartoons: Wackiki Wabbit (1943), Tee for Two (1945), A Little Soap and Water (1935), The Hep Cat (1942), Muscle Tussle (1953)
36	36	"Toony Sells Out"	February 22, 2021
Jealous of seeing his rival Kerwyn on Bill's mug, Toony becomes a salesfish for Cleam products in hopes of getting his face on a mug. Featured cartoons: Elmer's Pet Rabbit (1941), Taxi-Turvy (1954), Fool Coverage (1952), Going! Going! Gosh! (1952), Now That Summer Is Gone (1938)
37	37	"It's Show and Tell Day!"	February 23, 2021
It's Toony's first show and tell day at the studio, but he doesn't have anything to show the others. Featured cartoons: Birds Anonymous (1957), Scent-imental Romeo (1951), Zoom at the Top (1962), Robot Rabbit (1953), To Itch His Own (1958)
38	38	"Hello My BB"	February 24, 2021
Bill has trouble playing the guitar, but only when he's in front of an audience. Toony helps him conquer his fear. Featured cartoons: One Froggy Evening (1955), Hare Brush (1955), I Never Changes My Altitude (1937), Jerry-Go-Round (1966), Billy Boy (1954)
39	39	"Bill Is Part of a Healthy Breakfast"	February 25, 2021
Bill and Toony get their own breakfast cereal, but they need to figure out the right ingredients for it. Featured cartoons: The Windblown Hare (1949), I'm Just Wild About Jerry (1965), Beware of Barnacle Bill (1935), The Iceman Ducketh (1964), When I Yoo Hoo (1936)
40	40	"Stuff & Nonsense #1"	February 26, 2021
Bill and Toony gear up for the weekend with some comedy and games. Featured cartoons: The Unruly Hare (1945), Cellbound (1955), Easy Peckin's (1953), Brotherly Love (1936), Tease for Two (1965)
41	41	"Catch of the Day"	March 1, 2021
Toony is kidnapped by down-home celebrity chef Trisha Brine. Featured cartoons: Rabbit Seasoning (1952), Downhearted Duckling (1954), Betty in Blunderland (1934), Booby Hatched (1944), The House of Tomorrow (1949); Special Guest Appearance: Yakov Smirnoff as himself.
42	42	"Toony the Lyin' Tamer"	March 2, 2021
All heck breaks loose when Toony discovers Bill's clicker doubles as a lie detector. Featured cartoons: Half Fare Hare (1956), Doing Impossikible Stunts (1940), The Cat Above and The Mouse Below (1964), Claws for Alarm (1954), The Sneezing Weasel (1938)
43	43	"Cy-Bill 3000"	March 3, 2021
After Bill begins acting like a cyborg, Toony is convinced that there's a robot uprising and that humanity is being replaced by machines. Featured cartoons: To Hare is Human (1956), Guided Mouse-ille (1967), Hippydrome Tiger (1968), Rocket Squad (1956), Lost and Foundry (1937)
44	44	"Night School with Me"	March 4, 2021
The cast goes back to school. Featured cartoons: Bugs Bunny Rides Again (1948), The Flying Sorceress (1956), A Hull of a Mess (1942), The Gay Anties (1947), Crowing Pains (1947)
45	45	"We Need Somebody"	March 5, 2021
Bill and Toony interview some interesting candidates who can educate viewers about the human body. Featured cartoons: Now Hare This (1958), Quack Shot (1954), The Dance Contest (1934), Beep, Beep (1952), Daredevil Droopy (1951)
46	46	"Stuff & Nonsense #2"	March 8, 2021
Felton Fanboy points out goofs, Bill and Toony try to start a musical duo, Ms. Information anchors Toodaze News. Featured cartoons: Tweetie Pie (1947), Duck Soup to Nuts (1944), Fastest with the Mostest (1960), Baton Bunny (1959), Grampy's Indoor Outing (1936)
47	47	"Barnyard Bill's Yee Howdy!"	March 9, 2021
Bill plays a VHS tape of forgotten rural-themed 1970s variety show "Yee Howdy", with a cartoon lineup spotlighting hillbillies and country living. Featured cartoons: Posse Cat (1954), Hillbilly Hare (1950), Musical Mountaineers (1939), Hare Trigger (1945), Raw! Raw! Rooster! (1956)
48	48	"Chicken or Fish?"	March 10, 2021
Toony's rivalry with Kerwyn the Rubber Chicken Puppet (Svengoolie's sidekick from sister show Svengoolie, voiced by guest star Rich Koz) heats up after they mistakenly believe the MeTV boss, the Big Kahuna plans to fire one of them. Featured cartoons: Bill of Hare (1962), The Fistic Mystic (1946), Conrad the Sailor (1942), Hoppy Daze (1961), Caballero Droopy (1952)
49	49	"Bill Has a Frog In His Throat"	March 11, 2021
Bill blows out his vocal cords, so Toony hires a mime to teach him the art of silent performance. Featured cartoons: A Bird in a Guilty Cage (1952), Down Beat Bear (1956), Lickety-Splat (1961), The Stupor Salesman (1948), Ghosks is the Bunk (1939)
50	50	"What's Up, Jock?"	March 12, 2021
Shock jock "Simon Shock" buys time on the show to promote his "King of the Airwaves" campaign. Featured cartoons: Rebel Rabbit (1949), The Million Dollar Cat (1944), Betty Boop's Ker-Choo (1933), Ventriloquist Cat (1950), Yankee Doodle Daffy (1943)
51	51	"Stuff & Nonsense #3"	March 15, 2021
Toony faces off against Kerwyn in an epic staring contest, Goldie's yawning is contagious, and Lorna Greene promotes urban farming. Featured cartoons: Big House Bunny (1950), I Don't Scare (1956), Birds Of A Father (1961), Cock-a-Doodle Dog (1951), The Eager Beaver (1946)
52	52	"The Snow Day"	March 16, 2021
Bill gets stuck in a blizzard and can't make it into work, so it's up to Toony and his new pal, Phil the Cartoon Custodian, to host the show in Bill's absence. Featured cartoons: Fish Tales (1936), Hare Force (1944), The A-Tom-inable Snowman (1966), Along Came Daffy (1947), A Haul In One (1956)
53	53	"St. Patrick's Day"	March 17, 2021
The gang celebrates St. Patrick's Day. Featured cartoons: The Wearing of the Grin (1951), My Bunny Lies Over The Sea (1948), Droopy Leprechaun (1958), Aviation Vacation (1941), Shamrock And Roll (1969)
54	54	"Sventoonie"	March 18, 2021
Toony makes his debut as a horror show host with Bill as his sidekick. Featured cartoons: Hyde and Hare (1955), Hyde and Go Tweet (1960), Shiver Me Timbers! (1934), The Night of the Living Duck (1988), Haunted Mouse (1965)
55	55	"Quizzer Gets a Jemmy"	March 19, 2021
In this Academy Award-themed episode, Toony becomes jealous when Mr. Quizzer gets nominated for a prestigious prize. Featured cartoons: Mouse Wreckers (1949), Hollywood Daffy (1946), Now Hear This (1963), Touché, Pussy Cat! (1954), Knighty Knight Bugs (1958)
56	56	"Open Mic Night #1"	March 22, 2021
It's Open Mic Night at the Cackle Barrel nightclub, featuring jokes, poetry, and breakdancing from the gang. Featured cartoons: 14 Carrot Rabbit (1952), Scat Cats (1957), I Gopher You (1954), Catty-Cornered (1966), Joe Glow, the Firefly (1941)
57	57	"Invisi-Bill"	March 23, 2021
Toony accidentally turns Bill invisible using his powerful clicker. Featured cartoons: Case of the Missing Hare (1942), Daffy Rents (1966), Feather Bluster (1958), Popeye Meets Rip Van Winkle (1941), Barney Bear's Polar Pest (1944)
58	58	"Toony Reads Minds"	March 24, 2021
After a breakfast mishap, Bill's spaghetti strainer grants Toony the ability to hear other people's thoughts. Featured cartoons: The Hasty Hare (1952), Of Thee I Sting (1946), Stealin Aint Honest (1940), Hot-Rod and Reel! (1959), Canary Row (1950)
59	59	"Operation Kahuna"	March 25, 2021
In order to steal back an incriminating birthday card, Toony triggers Bill's hypnotic past-life identity as pickpocket Jimmy the Slice. Featured cartoons: Dr. Devil and Mr. Hare (1964), Jerry and Jumbo (1953), Patient Porky (1940), A Peck o' Trouble (1953), Leghorn Swoggled (1951)
60	60	"Toony Gets an Understudy"	March 26, 2021
Toony and Bill interview some interesting characters to fill in for the fish in case he's too busy to be Bill's sidekick. Featured cartoons: Curtain Razor (1949), A Star is Bored (1956), The Music Mice-Tro (1967), Lighthouse Mouse (1955), Tired and Feathered (1965)
61	61	"Stuff & Nonsense #4"	March 29, 2021
Skits feature old stuffed animals, Shakespearean lingo, the telephone game, a Svengoolie ghost story, and napping. Featured cartoons: Duck Dodgers in the 24½th Century (1953), Salt Water Tabby (1947), A Witch's Tangled Hare (1959), Fright to the Finish (1954), Feed the Kitty (1952)
62	62	"Lorna Rescues a Turtle"	March 30, 2021
Bill and Toony pet sit a turtle rescued by animal lover Lorna Greene. Featured cartoons: Tortoise Beats Hare (1941), Love Me, Love My Mouse (1966), Greedy for Tweety (1957), The Impossible Possum (1954), Guided Muscle (1955)
63	63	"Lingo Bingo"	March 31, 2021
Bill and the gang celebrate different types of popular slang. Featured cartoons: Symphony in Slang (1951), What Makes Daffy Duck (1948), Tree Cornered Tweety (1956), Shishkabugs (1962), Shake Your Powder Puff (1934)
64	64	"Foolin' Exchange"	April 1, 2021
This April Fools Day episode features Tüüni, a foreign exchange fish from Finland. Featured cartoons: Cracked Quack (1952), Ready, Set, Zoom! (1955), Mutiny Ain't Nice (1938), Dr. Jekyll and Mr. Mouse (1947), Prince Violent (1961)
65	65	"Easter Episode"	April 2, 2021
In a special Easter episode, Toony captures lesser-known holiday mascots while trying to catch the Easter Bunny and take over his job. Featured cartoons: Easter Yeggs (1947), Happy Go Ducky (1958), Child Psykolojiky (1941), Run, Run, Sweet Road Runner (1965), Woolen Under Where (1963)
66	66	"Who Is Your Spirit Animal"	April 5, 2021
A cursed social media personality quiz leaves Bill possessed by his Looney Tunes spirit animal. Featured cartoons: Foxy by Proxy (1952), Fowl Weather (1953), Muscle Beach Tom (1956), She-Sick Sailors (1944), Hollywood Capers (1935)
67	67	"Bill Failed PE"	April 6, 2021
Bill discovers that he needs to pass gym class in order to officially graduate from middle school. Featured cartoons: His Hare-Raising Tale (1951), The Chump Champ (1950), To Duck or Not to Duck (1943), Vim, Vigor and Vitaliky (1936), Cat's Paw (1959)
68	68	"Out! Of! Time!"	April 7, 2021
Mr. Quizzer is tapped to host MeTV's revival of a game show formerly hosted by Quizzer's late rival, Buddy Buzzer. Featured cartoons: This Is a Life? (1955), Tot Watchers (1958), Tweety and the Beanstalk (1957), To Beep or Not to Beep (1963), Terrier Stricken (1952)
69	69	"Bill Has the Hiccups"	April 8, 2021
Toony and the gang try to help Bill cure his hiccups without upsetting his sensitive palate. Featured cartoons: The Impatient Patient (1942), Spaced Out Bunny (1980), Dumb Patrol (1964), Baby Butch (1954), Goldimouse and the Three Cats (1960)
70	70	"Handlebar Bill"	April 9, 2021
Bill makes waves by growing a handlebar mustache in an episode devoted to facial hair. Featured cartoons: Captain Hareblower (1954), Double or Mutton (1955), Let's Get Movin' (1936), Bye, Bye Bluebeard (1949), Water, Water Every Hare (1952)
71	71	"Stuff & Nonsense #5"	April 12, 2021
Skits about Toony's "Back to the Future" weekend, Bill's inside jokes, voice actors, a bike messenger sing-along, and setting off the fire alarm. Featured cartoons: Lighter Than Hare (1960), Cue Ball Cat (1950), I'm in the Army Now (1936), Bear Raid Warden (1944), Don't Axe Me (1958)
72	72	"Guest Curator Day"	April 13, 2021
Guest curators introduce cartoons while Bill takes a sick day, and Svengoolie sends over some home remedies (via bat, naturally). Featured cartoons: Transylvania 6-5000 (1963), King-Size Canary (1947), Deputy Droopy (1955), From A to Z-Z-Z-Z (1954), The Super Snooper (1952)
73	73	"Toons & Temptations"	April 14, 2021
At the request of Bill's mom, the show is presented as a melodramatic soap opera. Featured cartoons: The Scarlet Pumpernickel (1950), No! No! A Thousand Times No!! (1935), Feline Frame-Up (1954), Mouse-Placed Kitten (1959), Cat and Dupli-cat (1967)
74	74	"Goldie & Toony at the Opera"	April 15, 2021
Goldie Fisher becomes an opera singer. Featured cartoons: A Corny Concerto (1943), The Cat Concerto (1947), High Note (1960), Book Revue (1946), Holiday for Shoestrings (1946)
75	75	"Brought to you by Cleam"	April 16, 2021
Bill and Toony offer a peek behind the scenes in a special show presented by corporate sponsor Cleam Industries. Featured cartoons: The Grey Hounded Hare (1949), Back Alley Oproar (1948), Banty Raids (1963), Hopalong Casualty (1960), Matinee Idol Popeye (1960)
76	76	"Toony's Calendar"	April 19, 2021
Toony creates a calendar for his adoring fans, with Bill acting as the photographer. Featured cartoons: Golden Yeggs (1950), Surf-Bored Cat (1967), Rabbit Transit (1947), Sheep Ahoy (1954), Barbecue Brawl (1956)
77	77	"Bill Gets Coffee"	April 20, 2021
A coffee order mix-up brings some unusual new characters to Bill and Toony's studio. Featured cartoons: Hare-Less Wolf (1958), The Year of the Mouse (1965), Me Feelins is Hurt (1940), Whoa, Be-Gone! (1958), Honey's Money (1962)
78	78	"It's Gil, Right?"	April 21, 2021
Bill and Toony learn about false memories and the Mandela Effect in a show that highlights the letter B. Featured cartoons: Bugs Bunny Gets the Boid (1942), The Bodyguard (1944), Baby Buggy Bunny (1954), Bugged by a Bee (1969), Musical Mountaineers (1939)
79	79	"The Strong & The Silent"	April 22, 2021
Toony and Bill seek to prove that each is more the "strong silent type" than the other. Featured cartoons: All a Bir-r-r-d (1950), Rabbit Punch (1948), Designs on Jerry (1955), Zip 'N Snort (1961), Kiss Me Cat (1953)
80	80	"The Baseball Episode"	April 23, 2021
Toony becomes a home run-hitting superstar in this special baseball-themed show. Featured cartoons: Baseball Bugs (1946), Gone Batty (1954), Porky's Baseball Broadcast (1940), The Twisker Pitcher (1937), Boulevardier from the Bronx (1936)
81	81	"Stuff & Nonsense #6"	April 26, 2021
Bill eats synonym cookies, MeTV hires a sports legend, Goldie attends a celebrity festival, and Bill gives a history lesson on cartoon voice actors. Featured cartoons: Bugsy and Mugsy (1957), It's Nice to Have a Mouse Around the House (1965), Cat Napping (1951), The Daffy Doc (1938), A Bird in a Bonnet (1958)
82	82	"The Lingonbuddy"	April 27, 2021
Bill competes with babies and a European boy to become the mascot for a line of lingonberry snack cakes. Featured cartoons: Baby Bottleneck (1946), Slicked-up Pup (1951), Zoom and Bored (1957), Little Dutch Plate (1935), Busy Bakers (1940)
83	83	"Hazardous Henry vs. Perilous Perry"	April 28, 2021
Bill gets caught up in a copyright infringement lawsuit when a new sitcom rips off his cult 1960s sitcom "Hazardous Henry". Featured cartoons: Upswept Hare (1953), Timid Tabby (1957), Onion Pacific (1940), The Unexpected Pest (1956), Porky's Pet (1936)
84	84	"Benny the IT Feller"	April 29, 2021
The IT workers at MeTV are aspiring stand-up comedians who begin to replace the more established characters on the show. Featured cartoons: Piker's Peak (1957), The Leghorn Blows at Midnight (1950), D' Fightin' Ones (1961), Hot Air Aces (1949), Porky's Hotel (1939)
85	85	"The Toony Tuna Club"	April 30, 2021
Bill and Toony are stuck babysitting a young Toony the Tuna Troop recruit named Dippy. Featured cartoons: Forward March Hare (1953), Egghead Rides Again (1937), Tom and Chérie (1955), The Up-Standing Sitter (1948), What -- No Spinach? (1936)
86	86	"Rabbit Tracks"	May 3, 2021
Best of Bugs Week, Day 1 explores the origins and early evolution of the Bugs Bunny character, starting with the proto-Bugs character 'Happy Rabbit'. Featured cartoons: Porky's Hare Hunt (1938), Prest-O Change-O (1939), Hare-um Scare-um (1939), Elmer's Candid Camera (1940), A Wild Hare (1940)
87	87	"Of Course You Realize This Means War"	May 4, 2021
Best of Bugs Week, Day 2 showcases Bugs Bunny's adversaries. Featured cartoons: Wabbit Twouble (1941), Duck! Rabbit, Duck! (1953), Devil May Hare (1954), Wild and Woolly Hare (1959), Hare-Way to the Stars (1958)
88	88	"Ballads for Bunny"	May 5, 2021
Best of Bugs Week, Day 3 highlights Bugs Bunny's greatest musical cartoons. Featured cartoons: Rhapsody Rabbit (1946), Long-Haired Hare (1949), Rabbit of Seville (1950), Baton Bunny (1959), What's Opera, Doc? (1957)
89	89	"Hollywood Bugs"	May 6, 2021
Best of Bugs Week, Day 4 spotlights Bugs Bunny's Hollywood- and showbiz-themed cartoons, often featuring celebrity caricatures. Featured cartoons: Slick Hare (1947), What's Cookin' Doc? (1944), A Hare Grows in Manhattan (1947), What's Up, Doc? (1950), A Star Is Bored (1956)
90	90	"Wascally Winners"	May 7, 2021
Best of Bugs Week, Day 5 presents the 1st Annual Toony Awards for the top Bugs Bunny cartoons, capped by the viewers' choice for the best. Featured cartoons: Baseball Bugs (1946), Little Red Riding Rabbit (1944), Bully for Bugs (1953), Hillbilly Hare (1950), What's Opera, Doc? (1957)
91	91	"Pink'd"	May 10, 2021
The show goes pink for a major announcement, and Toony is left in the dark about it. Featured cartoons: Porky's Naughty Nephew (1938), A Gruesome Twosome (1945), Cool Cat (1967), Royal Cat Nap (1958), The Pink Phink (1964)
92	92	"Stuff & Nonsense #7"	May 11, 2021
Public relations wizard Bash Hashtag returns, Goldie Fisher hears travel suggestions, and Gilbert Gottfried visits the show. Featured cartoons: Stupor Duck (1956), Cannery Rodent (1967), Northwest Hounded Police (1946), Wild Wild World (1960), The Old Grey Hare (1944)
93	93	"Portrait of a Tuna"	May 12, 2021
Bill tries to find a professional artist to paint Toony's portrait for MeTV. Featured cartoons: Mutiny on the Bunny (1950), Rabbit Rampage (1955), Clippety Clobbered (1966), Cartoons Ain't Human (1943), The Hep Cat (1942)
94	94	"Vampire Weekday"	May 13, 2021
After Toony suspects Bill is a vampire, Bill's role is revamped as a vampire character named Count Curatorium. Featured cartoons: Transylvania 6-5000 (1963), Bats in the Belfry (1942), Transylvania Mania (1968), Dr. Jerkyl's Hide (1954), Pink Panic (1967)
95	95	"Focus, Focus!"	May 14, 2021
Bill and Toony are visited by focus group consultant Sue P. from Sales. Featured cartoons: Bugs' Bonnets (1956), Nuts and Volts (1964), Nurse Mates (1940), Pink Ice (1965), Of Feline Bondage (1965)
96	96	"Open Mic Night #2"	May 17, 2021
It's another open mic night at the Cackle Barrel comedy club. Featured cartoons: Hamateur Night (1939), Big Top Bunny (1951), Daffy Dilly (1948), Rock 'n' Rodent (1967), Wimmin Hadn't Oughta Drive (1940)
97	97	"Craftwerk"	May 18, 2021
It's craft day on Toon In with Me. Featured cartoons: No Parking Hare (1954), The House Builder-Upper (1938), Rhapsody in Rivets (1941), Gee Whiz-z-z-z-z-z-z (1956), The Brothers Carry-Mouse-Off (1965)
98	98	"Gamblin' Bill"	May 19, 2021
Bill and Toony get a return visit from Mob Lobster. Featured cartoons: Sahara Hare (1955), Pink Sphinx (1968), Room and Bird (1951), Zip Zip Hooray! (1965), Heir Bear (1953)
99	99	"Return of Sventoonie"	May 20, 2021
It's the return of Sventoonie & Billwyn-until Sventoonie decides he needs a new horror show sidekick. Featured cartoons: Lovelorn Leghorn (1951), Shiver Me Timbers! (1934), Pink-A-Rella (1969), You Were Never Duckier (1948), Freudy Cat (1964)
100	100	"Golly Gal"	May 21, 2021
Bill and Toony try to entertain a younger generation by turning the clock back to the turn of the century (early 1900s-late 1910s). Featured cartoons: Those Were Wonderful Days (1934), Problem Pappy (1941), Hare and Loathing in Las Vegas (2004), Stage Door Cartoon (1944), Rushing Roulette (1965)
101	101	"Show and Tell Day #2"	May 24, 2021
The Toon In with Me gang has a Show and Tell Day, where they display some of their most prized possessions. Featured cartoons: Bunker Hill Bunny (1950), Catty-Cornered (1966), Shuteye Popeye (1952), I Taw a Putty Tat (1948), Swallow the Leader (1949)
102	102	"Stuff & Nonsense #8"	May 25, 2021
Bill's mom and dad set up a celebrity guest visit, or not; fun and games are included. Featured cartoons: Cock-A-Doodle-Duel (2004), The Flying Cat (1952), Design for Leaving (1954), Bad Ol' Putty Tat (1949), Backwoods Bunny (1959)
103	103	"Dog Day Morning"	May 26, 2021
In an episode all about man's best friend, Bill converses with the spirit of his childhood dog. Featured cartoons: Little Orphan Airedale (1947), A Waggily Tale (1958), Droopy's Double Trouble (1951), Fit to Be Tied (1952), No Barking (1954)
104	104	"Cap'n Bill '67"	June 3, 2021
Bill shows a 1967 episode of his favorite childhood show, "Cap'n Bill and His Sea Pals."; Featured cartoons: Hare Splitter (1948), Little 'Tinker (1948), Psychedelic Pink (1968), Bride and Gloom (1954), The Cat That Hated People (1948)
105	105	"National Donut Day"	June 4, 2021
It's time to celebrate Toony's favorite pastries. Featured cartoons: Hare Trimmed (1953), Quiet Please! (1945), It's the Natural Thing to Do (1939), Busy Bakers (1940), Porky's Pastry Pirates (1942)
106	106	"Road Trip"	May 31, 2021
Bill and Toony plan a Memorial Day road trip. Featured cartoons: Thumb Fun (1952), Mutts About Racing (1958), Pink Pistons (1966), So Does an Automobile (1939), There Auto Be a Law (1953)
107	107	"Yee Howdy Rides Again"	June 7, 2021
Western-themed episode featuring another of Bill's favorite shows from the past. Featured cartoons: Bugs Bunny Rides Again (1948), Texas Tom (1950), Vitamin Pink (1966), Whoops! I'm a Cowboy (1937), Drip-Along Daffy (1951)
108	108	"Wow What a Day!"	June 8, 2021
The Toon In with Me gang celebrates National Best Friends Day, World Oceans Day and National Name Your Poison Day -- all of which fall on June 8th. Featured cartoons: Pests for Guests (1955), Broom-Stick Bunny (1956), Fresh Fish (1939), Little Nobody (1935), Cat Feud (1958)
109	109	"Stuff & Nonsense #9"	June 9, 2021
Bill and Toony receive a lesson in proper hygiene, Sockeye Sam gives financial advice, and a new character shows up in the studio. Featured cartoons: The Cat's Me-Ouch! (1965), High Diving Hare (1949), Often an Orphan (1949), The Paneless Window Washer (1937), Carte Blanched (1969)
110	110	"Right Down the Middle"	June 10, 2021
Bill and Toony compete to host the show, with a line dividing the studio between them. Featured cartoons: The Dot and the Line (1965), The Honey-Mousers (1956), Go Away Stowaway (1967), The Screwy Truant (1945), Stop That Noise (1935)
111	111	"Bring a Kid to Work Day"	June 11, 2021
Bill & Toony are forced to entertain various kids and parents who show up to the studio. Featured cartoons: From Hare to Heir (1960), Tee for Two (1945), The Film Fan (1939), Dog Gone People (1960), The Dixie Fryer (1960)
112	112	"Tuna Roast"	June 14, 2021
Toony decides he wants to be roasted by all his friends, comedy style. Featured cartoons: Cherche Le Phanthom (1968), French Rarebit (1951), Much Ado About Mousing (1964), One Droopy Knight (1957), Go Go Amigo (1965)
113	113	"Mob Lobster's Greatest Hits"	June 15, 2021
Mob Lobster is guest cartoon curator, showing some of his favorites cartoons about crime. Featured cartoons: Jerry's Cousin (1951), Racketeer Rabbit (1946), Catty Cornered (1953), The Unmentionables (1963), Bars and Stripes Forever (1939)
114	114	"Weirdy Wednesday"	June 16, 2021
Toony and Bill unexpectedly swap brains and bodies, but they're not the only ones... Featured cartoons: Hawaiian Aye Aye (1964), Hot Cross Bunny (1948), Switchin' Kitten (1961), Tickled Pink (1968), The Spinach Roadster (1936)
115	115	"The Real Toon In with Me"	June 17, 2021
Drama unfolds as Bill and Toony star in a Toon In with Me reality show. Featured cartoons: Tick Tock Tuckered (1944), Tom's Photo Finish (1957), Claws in the Lease (1963), Wimmin Is a Myskery (1940), The Shell Shocked Egg (1948)
116	116	"Happy Father's Day"	June 18, 2021
On this special edition of Toon In with Me, Toony & Bill celebrate Father's Day by welcoming some of their favorite cartoon dads and even a couple of their own. Featured cartoons: Love That Pup (1949), Pop 'im Pop! (1950), Stork Naked (1955), Congratulations It's Pink (1967), Pop Goes Your Heart (1934)
117	117	"Stuff & Nonsense #10"	June 21, 2021
Mr. Quizzer hosts a new game show, Toony paints a portrait, and Goldie opens an art gallery. Featured cartoons: There They Go-Go-Go! (1956), The Football Toucher Downer (1937), His Bitter Half (1950), Mouse For Sale (1955), Cirrhosis of the Louvre (1966)
118	118	"Doughnuthole Run"	June 22, 2021
Bill, Toony & a few of their friends rev up their engines for a cross country race to see who gets to host. Featured cartoons: Tortoise Wins by a Hare (1943), Porky's Railroad (1937), The Great Continental Overland Cross-Country Race (1971), Onion Pacific (1940), Daffy Rents (1966)
119	119	"Open Mic Night #3"	June 23, 2021
Bill and Toony host another open mic night at their comedy club, "The Cackle Barrel", featuring comedy duos. Featured cartoons: Punch Trunk (1953), Gopher Broke (1958), Pup On a Picnic (1955), Scrambled Aches (1957), Dime to Retire (1955)
120	120	"The Spin Off"	June 24, 2021
Bill, Toony and some of their friends cook up some wild ideas after they're asked to come up with a spin-off. Featured cartoons: Duck Dodgers and the Return of the 24½th Century (1980), Pent-House Mouse (1963), Pip-eye, Pup-eye, Poop-eye An' Peep-eye (1942), Pinkfinger (1965), Ducking the Devil (1957)
121	121	"The Clue Club in The Case of the Missing Clicker"	June 25, 2021
Toony's "Clue Club" is on the case after Bill's magic clicker goes missing. Featured cartoons: Deduce, You Say! (1956), London Derriere (1968), Who Killed Who? (1943), The Mouse on 57th Street (1961), Bugs and Thugs (1954)
122	122	"Show & Tell Day #3"	June 28, 2021
Bill, Toony and friends share some of their most prized possessions while enjoying Show & Tell Day. Featured cartoons: The Astroduck (1966), Puttin' On the Dog (1944), Chaser on the Rocks (1965), A Hull of a Mess (1942), Dog Pounded (1954)
123	123	"Deep Thinking"	June 29, 2021
Toony grapples with some of life's big questions. Featured cartoons: An Egg Scramble (1950), Billy Boy (1954), Pink Outs (1967), Falling Hare (1943), Duck Amuck (1953)
124	124	"A Musical Episode"	June 30, 2021
A red-headed musical comedy star helps Bill and Toony celebrate some great musical cartoons featuring Bugs Bunny, Porky Pig and others. Featured cartoons: Let's Sing with Popeye (1934), I Love to Singa (1936), Katnip Kollege (1938), Gorilla My Dreams (1948), Swooner Crooner (1944)
125	125	"Mirror Universe"	July 1, 2021
Toony presses Bill's clicker and enters a parallel universe with an evil mustached Bill in charge. Featured cartoons: Muchos Locos (1966), Attack of the Drones (2004), Pre-Hysterical Hare (1958), The Hand is Pinker than the Eye (1967), Mouse and Garden (1960)
126	126	"Independence Day"	July 2, 2021
Bill and Toony celebrate Independence Day. Themed cartoons feature Bugs Bunny, Elmer Fudd and Popeye. Featured cartoons: Ant Pasted (1953), Patriotic Popeye (1957), Old Glory (1939), GI Pink (1968), Yankee Doodle Bugs (1954)
127	127	"Totally Tubular Toons"	July 5, 2021
'80s-themed episode featuring some shorts from that decade. Featured cartoons: Portrait of the Artist as a Young Bunny (1980), The Yolk's on You (1980), Daffy Flies North (1980), Pinto Pink (1967), The Duxorcist (1987)
128	128	"Shrimp Tank"	July 6, 2021
Bill appears on Shrimp Tank, a parody of Shark Tank. Featured cartoons: Hare Remover (1946), The Hole Idea (1955), Pleased to Meet Cha! (1935), Feed the Kitty (1952), Gee Whiz-z-z-z-z-z-z (1956)
129	129	"Toony in 3-D"	July 7, 2021
Bill and Toony must scrap their plans for a 3-D spectacular when they realize 3-D glasses were not provided to the viewers at home. Featured cartoons: Just Ducky (1953), Pigs is Pigs (1937), The Night of the Living Duck (1988), Porky's Tire Trouble (1939), Reaux, Reaux, Reaux Your Boat (1966)
130	130	"Toony Goes Hollywood"	July 8, 2021
Toony gets his big break as a top banana in Hollywood. Featured cartoons: Fast Buck Duck (1963), Bah Wilderness (1943), Life with Feathers (1945), Hawks and Doves (1968), Goo Goo Goliath (1954)
131	131	"Caps Off to Toony"	July 12, 2021
Toony prepares to graduate from Anvil U -- a cartoon university. Featured cartoons: Dr. Devil and Mr. Hare (1964), Duel Personality (1966), Bartholomew Versus the Wheel (1964), Fowl Play (1937), Each Dawn I Crow (1949)
132	132	"That Zit!"	July 13, 2021
Toony has a zit on his face and Dr. Beverly Blemish attempts to remove it. Featured cartoons: Home Tweet Home (1950), Hairied and Hurried (1965), Apes of Wrath (1959), The Invisible Mouse (1947), Pink of the Litter (1967)
133	133	"The Totally Real Holiday"	July 14, 2021
Toony celebrates "The Holiday" -- a holiday that Bill has never heard of. Featured cartoons: Holiday Highlights (1940), Barbary-Coast Bunny (1956), Unnatural History (1959), Lonesome Lenny (1946), Pink Is A Many Splintered Thing (1968)
134	134	"Toony Gets a Tattoo"	July 15, 2021
Bill helps Toony pick out a tattoo, but Toony starts to think twice. Featured cartoons: Riff Raffy Daffy (1948), With Poopdeck Pappy (1940), Nelly's Folly (1961), Nasty Quacks (1945), French Freud (1969)
135	135	"Stuff & Nonsense #11"	July 19, 2021
The gang gets a visit from dour meteorologist Misty Drizzle. Featured cartoons: Birth of a Notion (1947), Crockett-Doodle-Do (1960), Person to Bunny (1960), Cops Is Always Right (1938), A Rainy Day (1940)
136	136	"Toony Believes The Truth Is Out There"	July 20, 2021
Toony believes aliens have come to take over planet Earth, and that Bill is one of them. Featured cartoons: Beep Prepared (1961), Bomb Voyage (1967), Rocket to Mars (1946), Mouse Into Space (1962), Haredevil Hare (1948)
137	137	"Promo Shoot"	July 21, 2021
Toony and Bill help Sue P., from the sales department, create promotional material for the show, but learn it may not be as easy as it sounds. Featured cartoons: Mad as a Mars Hare (1963), Chili Corn Corny (1965), The Pink Tail Fly (1965), The Blow Out (1936), Henhouse Henery (1949)
138	138	"It's Showtime!"	July 22, 2021
Bill can't dance, so it's up to Toony and the gang to teach him how. Featured cartoons: The Dance Contest (1934), DownBeat Bear (1956), Show Biz Bugs (1957), Merlin the Magic Mouse (1967), Bully For Pink (1965)
139	139	"Doctor's Orders"	July 26, 2021
A quack doctor diagnoses a Polish Sausage diet for a listless Toony. Featured cartoons: The Daffy Doc (1938), Sheep Wrecked (1958), The Pink Blueprint (1966), Hook, Line and Stinker (1958), Hare Tonic (1945)
140	140	"Bugs' Birthday"	July 27, 2021
Bill and Toony celebrate Bugs Bunny's birthday by showing cartoons starring the wascally wabbit. Featured cartoons: The Heckling Hare (1941), Hare-Abian Nights (1959), Wet Hare (1962), (Blooper) Bunny (1991), Hare and Loathing in Las Vegas (2004)
141	141	"Bill's Legs Fall Asleep"	July 28, 2021
Bill's legs fall asleep and it's up to Toony to keep the show's footing. Featured cartoons: The Million Hare (1963), Bell Hoppy (1954), Jerry, Jerry, Quite Contrary (1966), For Better or Nurse (1945), Skyscraper Caper (1968)
142	142	"The Safety Dans"	July 29, 2021
An accident-prone Bill gets assistance from the "Safety Dans."; Featured cartoons: The Tree Surgeon (1944), Life with Tom (1953), Greedy for Tweety (1957), Compressed Hare (1961), Quackodile Tears (1962)
143	143	"Stuff and Nonsense #12"	August 2, 2021
Bill and Toony talk to a foley artist, a table lamp throws some shade, and artist Mel Attonin teaches sculpting. Featured cartoons: The High and the Flighty (1956), Rodent to Stardom (1967), The Little Wise Quacker (1952), Pink Pest Control (1969), Fast and Furry-ous (1949)
144	144	"Toony's Summer Games"	August 3, 2021
Toony competes in events that are catered to his specific skills. Featured cartoons: Mucho Mouse (1957), Sport Chumpions (1941), Boulder Wham! (1965), Popeye Meets Hercules (1948), Flying Feet (1969)
145	145	"Don't Be That Guy"	August 4, 2021
Bugs Bunny and Daffy Duck try to get on TV, Tom & Jerry reveal their secret formula and we pay tribute to the Public Service Announcement. Featured cartoons: The Last Hungry Cat (1961), Hobo Bobo (1947), The Farm of Tomorrow (1954), The Tom and Jerry Cartoon Kit (1962), People Are Bunny (1959)
146	146	"Runway Toony"	August 5, 2021
Toony launches a modeling career with the help of fashion photographer Smilan Sehchiz. Featured cartoons: Elmer's Candid Camera (1940), Billboard Frolics (1935), Be Kind to 'Aminals' (1935), In The Pink (1967), Prehistoric Porky (1940)
147	147	"Bill Faces the Monsters"	August 9, 2021
Bill has ignored his weekend responsibilities — which now come hunting for him as Monday Monsters. Featured cartoons: Hair-Raising Hare (1946), The Case of the Stuttering Pig (1937), Chimp & Zee (1968), Pink Paradise (1967), The Unshrinkable Jerry Mouse (1964)
148	148	"National Lazy Day"	August 10, 2021
The gang celebrates National Lazy Day. Featured cartoons: Bugs Bunny Gets the Boid (1942), The Bashful Buzzard (1945), Droopy Leprechaun (1958), Come On In! The Water's Pink (1968), Shuteye Popeye (1952)
149	149	"Camping"	August 11, 2021
Bill and Toony set up a campsite in the studio, tell ghost stories, and play music by the campfire. Featured cartoons: My Favorite Duck (1942), Rock-a-Bye-Pinky (1966), Joe Glow, the Firefly (1941), Big Game Haunt (1968), Two Gophers from Texas (1948)
150	150	"Cupley's Believe It If You Want"	August 12, 2021
Toony's dream of making it into the notorious "Believe It If You Want" comic strip just may come true, with the help of some wacky Toon In with Me friends. Featured cartoons: Nutty News (1942), Greek Mirthology (1954), Garden Gopher (1950), Believe It Or Else (1939), Genie with the Light Pink Fur (1966)
151	151	"Friday the 13th"	August 13, 2021
Bill and Toony get frightened by the rest of the cast. Featured cartoons: Scaredy Cat (1948), Haunted Mouse (1965), Spooky Swabs (1957), The Abominable Snow Rabbit (1961), Hyde and Go Tweet (1960)
152	152	"Toony's Time Loop"	August 16, 2021
Toony gets caught in a mysterious time loop where he lives the same day over and over. Featured cartoons: Satan's Waitin' (1954), Why Do I Dream Those Dreams? (1934), An Ounce Of Pink (1965), The Duck Doctor (1952), See Ya Later Gladiator (1968)
153	153	"Team Building #1"	August 17, 2021
Bill and Toony bond with their "Toon In with Me" colleagues through a series of team-building exercises. Featured cartoons: The Wild Chase (1965), Flies Ain't Human (1941), Making Friends (1936), Mouse Taken Identity (1957), Homeless Hare (1950)
154	154	"Yee Howdy #3"	August 18, 2021
Toony replaces sidekick Chris P. Catfish on rural variety show "Yee Howdy". Featured cartoons: War and Pieces (1964), Tar With A Star (1949), Oily Hare (1952), Little Beaux Pink (1968), Bad Day At Cat Rock (1965)
155	155	"Best in Show"	August 19, 2021
On what is meant to be a Cartoon Curator's Choice show, Bill ends up playing everyone else's top cartoon picks: Featured cartoons: The Big Snooze (1946), Dog Tales (1958), The Bear That Wasn't (1967), The Man on the Flying Trapeze (1934), Pink Panzer (1965)
156	156	"The Imaginary Fiend"	August 20, 2021
Bill is reunited with his childhood imaginary friend, who suspiciously doesn't seem very imaginary to the rest of the crew. Featured cartoons: A Kiddies Kitty (1955), Cheese It, the Cat! (1957), Pet Peeve (1954), In the Pink of the Night (1969), Hare-Breadth Hurry (1963)
157	157	"Cap'n Bill's Back to School Spectacular!"	August 23, 2021
Bill plays a 1976 episode of "Cap 'n Bill and His Sea Pals" to celebrate the first day of school. Featured cartoons: Little School Mouse (1954), I Haven't Got a Hat (1935), Blackboard Jumble (1957), The Screwy Truant (1945), Little Boy Boo (1954)
158	158	"Tyler"	August 24, 2021
When Goldie's assistant goes missing in Marrakesh, Bill and Toony are swept up into a world of international espionage. Featured cartoons: Ali Baba Bunny (1957), Shoein' Hosses (1934), Unsafe and Seine (1966), The Mouse From H.U.N.G.E.R. (1967), Wild About Hurry (1959)
159	159	"Toony Procrastinates"	August 25, 2021
Toony finds new excuses not to clean the algae and slime from his fish tank while Bill is out of the studio. Featured cartoons: Boobs in the Woods (1950), The Rattled Rooster (1948), Swat the Fly (1935), Mess Production (1945), The Peachy Cobbler (1950)
160	160	"Bill Hears an Ocarina"	August 26, 2021
Bill is distracted by a high-pitched flute sound that nobody else seems to be able to hear. Featured cartoons: Knighty Knight Bugs (1958), Johann Mouse (1953), Pink, Plunk, Plink (1966), Dixieland Droopy (1954), Three Little Bops (1957)
161	161	"Fun with Phobias"	August 27, 2021
Toony is afraid of elbows and tries to trigger Bill's fear of bellybuttons. Featured cartoons: The Missing Mouse (1953), Curious Puppy (1939), Daffy Doodles (1946), Fin'n Catty (1943), A Street Cat Named Sylvester (1953)
162	162	"Company Softball Team"	August 30, 2021
Bill and Toony hold tryouts for their softball team. Featured cartoons: Gone Batty (1954), O-Solar Meow (1967), Screwball Squirrel (1944), A Fink in the Rink (1971), A Squeak in the Deep (1966)
163	163	"Toony the Crooner"	August 31, 2021
Toony revisits his prior career as a jazzy nightclub singer to pay off a gambling debt to Mob Lobster, and winds up inking a record deal. Featured cartoons: Zipping Along (1953), Solid Serenade (1946), Let It Be Me (1936), No! No! A Thousand Times No!! (1935), Hurdy-Gurdy Hare (1950)
164	164	"Bill Tries French Toast"	September 1, 2021
Bill's first taste of French toast changes him in this special French-themed episode. Featured cartoons: Napoleon Bunny-Part (1956), Young and Healthy (1933), Shot and Bothered (1966), Le Quiet Squad (1967), Boston Quackie (1957)
165	165	"Cartoons Are So Lit!"	September 2, 2021
Sue P. tries to market the show toward a hipper millennial audience, as the cartoon lineup showcases Looney Tunes from the 1990s and 2000s. Featured cartoons: My Generation G... G... Gap (2004), From Hare To Eternity (1997), Museum Scream (2003), Whizzard of Ow (2003), Superior Duck (1996)
166	166	"Fan-Tastic Friday #1"	September 3, 2021
On the first-ever "Fan-Tastic Friday" episode, the show is dedicated to the fans at home, featuring their questions, suggestions, and submissions. Featured cartoons: The Wabbit Who Came to Supper (1942), Flirty Birdy (1945), Feud With A Dude (1968), Homesteader Droopy (1954), Walky Talky Hawky (1946)
167	167	"Taking What They're Giving"	September 6, 2021
On Labor Day, Bill and Toony gain a new appreciation for the show's hard-working crew, featuring job-themed cartoons. Featured cartoons: Paying the Piper (1949), Prefabricated Pink (1967), Steal Wool (1957), I Wanna Be A Life Guard (1936), A Pest in the House (1947)
168	168	"Tailgating Toony"	September 7, 2021
Bill and Toony tailgate cartoons as if they were a sporting event, with some unusual tailgate party traditions. Featured cartoons: Rabbit's Kin (1952), The Hound and the Rabbit (1937), Knight Mare Hare (1955), You Gotta Be A Football Hero (1935), Pink Punch (1966)
169	169	"Jock & The Box"	September 8, 2021
Radio shock jock Simon Shock takes his morning zoo crew simulcast to the "Toon In with Me" studio and hires Boxcar as his new on-air producer. Featured cartoons: Bugs Bunny and the Three Bears (1944), The Zoot Cat (1944), The Wise Quacking Duck (1943), Tweetie Pie (1947), Toy Town Hall (1936)
170	170	"Stuff & Nonsense #13"	September 9, 2021
There's an elephant in the room, Felton Fanboy and Felicia Fangirl buy a video game, Toony paints a portrait of Drew Barrymore and Trisha Brine shares a new recipe. Featured cartoons: Operation: Rabbit (1952), The Impractical Joker (1937), The Bowling Alley Cat (1942), Crow De Guerre (1967), The Slap-Hoppy Mouse (1956)
171	171	"Fan-Tastic Friday #2"	September 10, 2021
Bill and Toony get a visit from a Super-Tooner and take requests. Featured cartoons: Porky's Duck Hunt (1937), Dog Gone Modern (1939), Quiet! Pleeze (1941), Sweet and Sourdough (1969), Shutter Bugged Cat (1967)
172	172	"Let's Get Physicals"	September 13, 2021
Bill and Toony take their annual physical exams. Featured cartoons: The Draft Horse (1942), Patient Porky (1940), The Pink Pill (1968), Is There a Doctor in the Mouse? (1964), A Sheep in the Deep (1962)
173	173	"Can of Cake!"	September 14, 2021
Toony gets his head stuck in a can and Bill tries many ways to help him out. Featured cartoons: Snow Business (1953), Tour De Farce (1967), Officer Pooch (1941), Cannery Rodent (1967), All Fowled Up (1955)
174	174	"British Toon in with Me"	September 15, 2021
Bill and Toony air the UK version of their show. Featured cartoons: Knights Must Fall (1949), Out-Foxed (1949), The Queen Was in the Parlor (1932), Pink Valiant (1968), Now Hear This (1963)
175	175	"Bonky Has a Blanky"	September 16, 2021
Bill says goodbye to his childhood blanket. Featured cartoons: The Foxy Duckling (1947), Swing Ding Amigo (1966), Sleepy Time Squirrel (1954), We Give Pink Stamps (1965), Golden Yeggs (1950)
176	176	"Fan-Tastic Friday #3"	September 17, 2021
Bill and Toony celebrate the show's fans. Featured cartoons: Tweet Tweet Tweety (1951), Neapolitan Mouse (1954), Long-Haired Hare (1949), The Bee-Deviled Bruin (1949), Sky Blue Pink (1968)
177	177	"Bill's Famous"	September 20, 2021
Bill is mistaken for his celebrity lookalike, pop idol Dill Jeff of the boy band Lunch Table. Featured cartoons: Oily Hare (1952), Banty Raids (1963), Parlez Vous Woo (1956), Twinkle, Twinkle Little Pink (1968), Bingo Crosbyana (1936)
178	178	"Tic Tac Toony"	September 21, 2021
Bill and Toony help Mr. Quizzer fulfill his contract by recording the 100th episode of his game show, "Tic Tac Toony". Featured cartoons: The Ducksters (1950), Pink Posies (1967), The Counterfeit Cat (1949), Bill of Hare (1962), Zoom at the Top (1962)
179	179	"National Hunting & Fishing"	September 22, 2021
Toony is hesitant to participate in an episode celebrating National Hunting and Fishing Day, while Teddy Roosevelt is on the hunt for the red tuna. Featured cartoons: Daffy Duck Hunt (1949), Field and Scream (1955), Bear De Guerre (1968), Bird-Brain Bird Dog (1954), Rabbit Seasoning (1952)
180	180	"Fan-Tastic Friday #4"	September 24, 2021
Feedback from fans. Featured cartoons: Jack-Wabbit and the Beanstalk (1943), Smarty Cat (1955), The Dover Boys (1942), La Feet's Defeat (1968), What's My Lion? (1961)
181	181	"Craftwerk #2"	September 28, 2021
Bill and Toony celebrate Craft Day. Featured cartoons: The Fair-Haired Hare (1951), The Brave Little Bat (1941), Advance and Be Mechanized (1967), Put-Put, Pink (1968), Good Night Elmer (1940)
182	182	"Pie Me to the Moon"	September 30, 2021
Toony inherits a pie shop from Mob Lobster and has no idea on how to run a business. Featured cartoons: Heir-Conditioned (1955), Heir Bear (1953), Customers Wanted (1939), Dough Ray Me-ow (1948), A Ham in a Role (1949)
183	183	"Fan-Tastic Friday #5"	October 1, 2021
The fifth "Fan-Tastic Friday" episode, shifting the focus to viewer feedback and fan-submitted content. Featured cartoons: Acrobatty Bunny (1946), Extinct Pink (1969), Dicky Moe (1962), Olive's $weep$take Ticket (1941), Awful Orphan (1949)
184	184	"Bill & Toony's Plant"	October 4, 2021
Bill and Toony get a taste of parenthood when they are asked to watch a friend's plant. Featured cartoons: Upswept Hare (1953), Flowers for Madame (1935), Hurts and Flowers (1969), Porky's Garden (1937), Gopher Spinach (1954)
185	185	"In La-La Land"	October 5, 2021
Bill and Toony pay tribute to the city of Los Angeles. Featured cartoons: Hollywood Daffy (1946), Say Cheese, Please (1970), Hollywood Steps Out (1941), Hollywood Capers (1935), The Coo-Coo Nut Grove (1936)
186	186	"Yee Howdy Hoodang!"	October 7, 2021
It's a Yee Howdy Hoodang. Are you ready to dance to 1978 disco? Featured cartoons: Devil's Feud Cake (1963), A Hick, a Slick and a Chick (1948), Hobby Horse-Laffs (1942), A Broken Leghorn (1959), Pink on the Cob (1969)
187	187	"Fan-Tastic Friday #6"	October 8, 2021
The sixth weekly "Fan-Tastic Friday" episode, dedicated to the fans at home and featuring viewer-submitted questions and suggestions. Featured cartoons: Jumpin' Jupiter (1955), Plasterd In Paris (1966), Early To Bet (1951), The Uninvited Pest (1943), Daffy Duck & Egghead (1938)
188	188	"Show & Tell Day #4"	October 11, 2021
Bill misplaces his bag of collectibles on Show and Tell Day. Featured cartoons: Hare We Go (1951), The Three Little Pups (1953), Cock-a-Doodle Deaux Deaux (1966), The Fire Alarm (1936), Hop, Look and Listen (1948)
189	189	"A Tribute to the Movies"	October 13, 2021
Bill and Toony celebrate the movie theaters. Featured cartoons: Hare Do (1949), She Was an Acrobat's Daughter (1937), Matinee Mouse (1966), Stage Fright (1940), Box-Office Bunny (1991)
190	190	"P's and Q's"	October 14, 2021
When Bill has jury duty, Toony takes over hosting duty and only shows cartoons where characters' names begin with "P" and or "Q". Featured cartoons: 8 Ball Bunny (1950), Dial "P" for Pink (1965), Pest Pilot (1941), Little Quacker (1950), Calling Dr. Porky (1940)
191	191	"Fan-Tastic Friday #7"	October 15, 2021
It's the 7th "Fan-Tastic Friday" on Toon In with Me. Featured cartoons: Down and Outing (1961), Sacré Bleu Cross (1967), Super-Rabbit (1943), A Bone for a Bone (1951), Tweet and Lovely (1959)
192	192	"Bill 2: Algae Boogaloo"	October 19, 2021
Toony gets friendly with the diver in his tank and calls him "Bill."; Featured cartoons: Hare Ribbin' (1944), Porky's Five & Ten (1938), Surf-Bored Cat (1967), Pantry Panic (1941), Woolen Under Where (1963)
193	193	"A Fork in the Road"	October 20, 2021
Bill comes to a fork in the road, which turns out to be a magical opportunity. Featured cartoons: Sugar and Spies (1966), Ancient Fistory (1953), Wags to Riches (1949), Porky's Pooch (1941), Lucky Pink (1968)
194	194	"Mornin'"	October 21, 2021
Management forces Bill and Toony to adopt a more conventional morning show format. Featured cartoons: The Million Dollar Cat (1944), Doggone Tired (1949), Pinkadilly Circus (1968), Wackiki Wabbit (1943), Kitty Kornered (1946)
195	195	"Fan-Tastic Friday #8"	October 22, 2021
Bill and the gang reach out to the fans. Featured cartoons: Fox-Terror (1957), Choose Your "Weppins" (1935), One Cab's Family (1952), It's Greek to Me-ow! (1961), Birdy and the Beast (1944)
196	196	"Toony's Tell-All"	October 25, 2021
Toony gets the idea to write a tell-all memoir. Featured cartoons: Tree Cornered Tweety (1956), Rabbit Stew and Rabbits Too (1969), Innertube Antics (1944), Super Pink (1966), Mouse Trouble (1944)
197	197	"Toony's Lemonade Stand"	October 26, 2021
Toony expands his brand with lemonade that Bill and the cast can't get enough of, but they don't know what the secret ingredient is. Featured cartoons: Hare Remover (1946), Blue Cat Blues (1956), Chaser on the Rocks (1965), The Pink Quarterback (1968), Hoppy-Go-Lucky (1952)
198	198	"Whose Your Daddy?"	October 28, 2021
Bill, Toony and Benny the IT Feller welcome an unexpected visitor. Featured cartoons: A Mouse Divided (1953), Little Swee'Pea (1936), Go Fly a Kit (1957), That's My Mommy (1955), Baby Buggy Bunny (1954)
199	199	"Billoween"	October 29, 2021
Bill, Toony and the rest of the gang celebrate and dress up for Halloween. Featured cartoons: Scaredy Cat (1948), The Flying Sorceress (1956), Sicque! Sicque! Sicque! (1966), Fright to the Finish (1954), A-Haunting We Will Go (1966)
200	200	"Oh Canada 2: Hockey Schtick"	November 2, 2021
Toony heads to the set of the Canadian Toon In with Me for a lesson on being nice. Featured cartoons: Tease for Two (1965), The Iceman Ducketh (1964), Canadian Can-Can (1967), Highway Runnery (1965), Along Came Daffy (1947)
201	201	"Look Who's Famous Now"	November 3, 2021
Bill's parents become famous. Featured cartoons: The Hollywood Bowl (1950), Pink-A-Boo (1966), Olive Oyl for President (1948), Cinderella Meets Fella (1938), Zip 'N Snort (1961)
202	202	"I Like to Hobby"	November 4, 2021
Toony and the gang help Bill find a new hobby. Featured cartoons: Kitty Foiled (1948), Problem Pappy (1941), Count Me Out (1938), Slink Pink (1969), Hot-Rod and Reel! (1959)
203	203	"Fan-Tastic Friday #9"	November 5, 2021
The fans pick out their favorite cartoons. Featured cartoons: 14 Carrot Rabbit (1952), Hook, Line and Stinker (1958), The Two Mouseketeers (1952), Olive's $weep$take Ticket (1941), Awful Orphan (1949)
204	204	"Shoe of Wishes"	November 9, 2021
Bill conjures up a genie from his shoe who happens to be Marty Smarty Pants. Featured cartoons: A-Lad-In His Lamp (1948), Genie with the Light Pink Fur (1966), Bad Luck Blackie (1949), Is My Palm Read (1933), I Don't Scare (1956)
205	205	"Psychological Thriller"	November 10, 2021
Goldie, Bill and Toony's book club's current read starts to bleed into reality. Featured cartoons: To Beep or Not to Beep (1963), Sniffles and the Bookworm (1939), A Great Big Bunch of You (1932), Downhearted Duckling (1954), Pinknic (1967)
206	206	"The Amazing Hat-Chop from Billco"	November 11, 2021
Bill accidentally orders too many hats, but he has a business plan that just might save the day. Featured cartoons: Zoom at the Top (1962), Design for Leaving (1954), House Hunting Mice (1947), Car of Tomorrow (1951), Bugs' Bonnets (1956); Note: In Bugs' Bonnets, the scene where an Indian headdress lands on Bugs Bunny, who adopts a stereotyped Indian war whoop, was edited out by having the camera zoom in on Elmer Fudd with three seconds of silence.
207	207	"Fan-Tastic Friday #10"	November 12, 2021
The show is curated by the fans of Toon In with Me. Featured cartoons: Roman Legion Hare (1955), Pierre and Cottage Cheese (1969), Roughly Squeaking (1946), I Likes Babies and Infinks (1937), High Steaks (1962)
208	208	"Stuff & Nonsense #14"	November 15, 2021
Pop Quizzer leads a workout, The Peaceful Painter sketches a portrait and Trisha Brine shares a new recipe. Featured cartoons: The Prize Pest (1951), The Hot Air Salesman (1937), The Milky Way (1940), Le Bowser Bagger (1967), Whoa, Be Gone! (1958)
209	209	"Stormy Weather"	November 16, 2021
A storm engulfs the studio and the cast is relegated to the basement for shelter, until they discover the Big Kahuna's top-secret panic room is not being used. Featured cartoons: Bunny Hugged (1951), Pink Panic (1967), Porky the Rain-Maker (1936), Barking Dogs Don't Fite (1949), Road to Andalay (1964)
210	210	"The Old Neighborhood (Over by There)"	November 17, 2021
Bill and the gang celebrate a reunion in Chicago; a celebration of some voice actors including Mel Blanc, Stan Freberg, Victor Moore, Jack Mercer, Pinto Colvig and Daws Butler. Featured cartoons: Birds Anonymous (1957), A Bear for Punishment (1951), Ain't That Ducky (1945), Me Musical Nephews (1942), Little Rural Riding Hood (1949)
211	211	"Embrace the Sock"	November 18, 2021
Toony comes up with the greatest new invention since the Pet Rock. Featured cartoons: A Witch's Tangled Hare (1959), The Dog House (1952), Pink in The Clink (1968), Tugboat Granny (1956), Barney's Hungry Cousin (1953)
212	212	"Fan-Tastic Friday #11"	November 19, 2021
Bill and Toony take requests and answer mail from viewers. Featured cartoons: Professor Tom (1948), Bridgework (1970), Cobs and Robbers (1953), Quentin Quail (1946), Too Hop To Handle (1956)
213	213	"Bill Didn't Start the Fire"	November 22, 2021
Bill gets distracted while trying to prepare for the show and inadvertently ignites a fire in anyone who asks him for advice. Featured cartoons: Snowbody Loves Me (1964), Well Worn Daffy (1965), Pinkcome Tax (1968), The Two-Alarm Fire (1934), Trick or Tweet (1959)
214	214	"Foresenic Fish Tales"	November 23, 2021
Toony becomes an expert in foresenic science. Featured cartoons: Rabbitson Crusoe (1956), Robin Hoodwinked (1958), Pickled Pink (1965), Bride and Gloom (1954), Sandy Claws (1955)
215	215	"The First Thanksgiving"	November 24, 2021
Bill and Toony celebrate Thanksgiving. Featured cartoons: Canned Feud (1951), Tom Turkey and His Harmonica Humdingers (1940), Swat the Fly (1935), Holiday for Drumsticks (1949), Stop! Look! And Hasten! (1954)
216	216	"Fan-Tastic Friday #12"	November 26, 2021
The show is curated by the fans of Toon In with Me. Featured cartoons: Suppressed Duck (1965), The Homeless Flea (1940), Hare-Breadth Hurry (1963), Betty Boop with Henry, the Funniest Living American (1935), Catch as Cats Can (1947)
217	217	"Four Dollar Bill"	November 29, 2021
Toony and the gang help Bill figure out to invest money that he inherited from his grandparents. Featured cartoons: Heir-Conditioned (1955), Daffy Dilly (1948), Robin Goodhood (1970), Grin and Share It (1957), Honey's Money (1962)
218	218	"Dead Presidential Fitness Test"	November 30, 2021
Bill and Toony decide to bring back the Presidential Fitness Test. Featured cartoons: Hoppy Daze (1961), Think Before You Pink (1969), Betty Boop and Little Jimmy (1936), The Eager Beaver (1946), Ballot Box Bunny (1951)
219	219	"Bill Is Sleepwalking"	December 2, 2021
Bill sleepwalks through the episode. Featured cartoons: Skyscraper Caper (1968), The Unbearable Bear (1943), Jerry, Jerry, Quite Contrary (1966), A Dream Walking (1934), Fast Buck Duck (1963)
220	220	"Fan-Tastic Friday #13"	December 3, 2021
Bill and Toony take cartoon requests from the show's fans. Featured cartoons: Little Runaway (1952), Le Escape Goat (1967), Bully for Bugs (1953), Plop Goes the Weasel (1953), Polar Pals (1939)
221	221	"The First Ever Hosted Morning Cartoon Show Hanukkah Special in TV History (Probably)"	December 6, 2021
Bill and Toony celebrate Hanukkah. Featured cartoons: Hip Hip-Hurry! (1958), The Slick Chick (1962), The Blue Danube (1939), Mice Follies (1954), The Jet Cage (1962)
222	222	"Toony's Funeral"	December 7, 2021
Toony's got an idea that will let him hear all the great things people have to say about him: plan his own funeral, of course. Featured cartoons: Daffy Duck and the Dinosaur (1939), Sink Pink (1965), Olive's Boithday Presink (1941), Cat-Tastrophy (1949), Heavenly Puss (1949)
223	223	"Bill Is On a Juice Cleanse"	December 8, 2021
Bill changes colors after a juice cleanse. Featured cartoons: The Hare-Brained Hypnotist (1942), Ah, Sweet Mouse-Story of Life (1965), Fair and Worm-er (1946), Don't Give Up the Sheep (1953), The Crackpot Quail (1941)
224	224	"Hazardous Henry the Final Episode"	December 13, 2021
Bill and Toony watch the final, unaired episode of the sitcom "Hazardous Henry" that Bill was in as a kid. Featured cartoons: Zip Zip Hooray! (1965), The Merry Old Soul (1935), A Taste Of Money (1970), Porky's Super Service (1937), The Squawkin' Hawk (1942)
224	224–S	"MeTV's Super Colossal Cartoon Christmas"	December 13, 2021
Bill and Toony co-host a special two-hour showcase of classic yuletide cartoons featuring Bugs Bunny, Popeye, Tom & Jerry, and more. There's also a sackful of seasonal silliness with Mr. Quizzer, Goldie Fisher, and the rest of the show's regular cast, plus special guest-stars Svengoolie, Kerwyn, and — possibly — Santa. Featured cartoons: Gift Wrapped (1952), One Ham's Family (1943), Gifts from the Air (1937), The Peachy Cobbler (1950), Somewhere in Dreamland (1936), Bedtime for Sniffles (1940), Seasin's Greetinks! (1933), The Night Before Christmas (1941), The Fright Before Christmas (1979); Note: This episode aired in prime-time.
225	225	"Toony's Time Capsule"	December 15, 2021
Bill comes across the time capsule he buried as a kid, but when it comes time to open it he has second thoughts. Featured cartoons: One Meat Brawl (1947), Pre-Hysterical Man (1948), Reel Pink (1965), T.V. of Tomorrow (1953), One Froggy Evening (1955)
226	226	"It Is to Laugh"	December 16, 2021
Toony tries becoming a standup comic. Featured cartoons: What's Up, Doc? (1950), Book Revue (1946), Shakesperian Spinach (1940), The Flea Circus (1954), The Gay Anties (1947)
227	227	"The Hot Christmas Toy"	December 17, 2021
Bill and Toony find out that this year's hot Christmas toy is a talking Bill the Cartoon Curator doll. Featured cartoons: Hairied and Hurried (1965), Happy Tots Expedition (1940), Mice Follies (1960), The Up-Standing Sitter (1948), Baby Wants a Bottleship (1942)
228	228	"The Not-so-Special Christmas Special"	December 20, 2021
The cast of Toon In with Me presents their "Not-so-Special Christmas Special", which features all the stuff that didn't make it into the prime time show. Featured cartoons: Landing Stripling (1962), A Gander at Mother Goose (1940), Novelty Shop (1936), Holiday Highlights (1940), Fast and Furry-ous (1949)
229	229	"More News at 11"	December 21, 2021
Bill and Toony become news broadcasters. Featured cartoons: Buckaroo Bugs (1944), The Year of the Mouse (1965), Le Pig-Al Patrol (1967), Corn Plastered (1951), Quackodile Tears (1962)
230	230	"No Rats, Ands or Buts"	December 22, 2021
Bill and Toony try to decide on a new logo that includes both of their names. Featured cartoons: Tweet Zoo (1957), Zoom and Bored (1957), A Pair of Sneakers (1969), The A-Tom-inable Snowman (1966), Goofy Gophers (1947)
231	231	"Christmas Toons"	December 23, 2021
232	232	"Christmas Toons"	December 24, 2021
A two-part special featuring Christmas cartoons and comedy. Featured cartoons: Gift Wrapped (1952), One Ham's Family (1943), Gifts from the Air (1937), Somewhere in Dreamland (1936), Bedtime for Sniffles (1940), Seasin's Greetinks! (1933), The Night Before Christmas (1941), The Fright Before Christmas (1979)
233	233	"Sleepover at the Studio"	December 27, 2021
Bill and Toony keep each other awake playing pranks and games in their annual Studio Sleepover. Featured cartoons: Little Red Rodent Hood (1952), Pink Pajamas (1964), Midnight Frolics (1938), More Pep (1936), The Cat Above and the Mouse Below (1964)
234	234	"Fun with Phobias #2"	December 28, 2021
The cast members of Toon In with Me reveal some of their greatest fears. Featured cartoons: Transylvania 6-5000 (1963), Dr. Jerkyl's Hide (1954), The Cuckoo Clock (1950), Transylvania Mania (1968), The Night Watchman (1938)
235	235	"An Anvil Hits Bill"	December 29, 2021
An anvil hits Bill on the head, changing his persona to that of a classic television character. Featured cartoons: Buccaneer Bunny (1948), Mother Was a Rooster (1962), Shoein' Hosses (1934), The Duck Doctor (1952), Mexican Cat Dance (1963)
