= A Bird in a Bonnet =

1958 film

- Directed by: Friz Freleng
- Story by: Warren Foster
- Starring: Mel Blanc; Additional voice characterization: June Foray (uncredited); Daws Butler (uncredited)
- Edited by: Treg Brown
- Music by: John Seely
- Animation by: Gerry Chiniquy; Arthur Davis; Virgil Ross
- Layouts by: Hawley Pratt
- Backgrounds by: Tom O'Loughlin
- Color process: Technicolor
- Production company: Warner Bros. Cartoons
- Distributed by: Warner Bros. Pictures
- Release date: September 27, 1958 (USA)
- Running time: 6:30 (one reel)
- Language: English

A Bird in a Bonnet is a 1958 Warner Bros. Merrie Melodies animated short directed by Friz Freleng. The voices were performed by Mel Blanc, Daws Butler and June Foray. The short was released on September 27, 1958, and stars Tweety and Sylvester.

== Plot ==
Granny visits a 1950s New York City hat shop looking for a new hat. The sales lady has her try on several hats, but Granny seems unsatisfied with each choice (a Napoleon chapeau makes her imitate Napoleon's hand in coat pose and chuckle "Not tonight, Josephine!"). Meanwhile, Sylvester is chasing Tweety outside and Tweety makes his way into the hat shop. Just as Tweety hides at a table, Sylvester runs in and tries to rummage through the hats to look for him, but the sales lady catches him in the act, and chases him out. Just as the sales lady comes to the table where Tweety is hiding, Tweety stands real still on a hat, making the sales lady think that he's a cute little stuffed bird on a hat. After Granny tries it on, she thinks the same thing and buys the hat.

Tweety soon realizes the joys of being said "stuffed bird" has a two-fold purpose, the second being that it is perfect refuge from Sylvester. But as usual, the puddy tat does everything to get at the bird, first following Granny out of the hat shop. The first time, Granny turns around, but sees Sylvester pretending to sleep. The second time, Granny quickly gets wise and swats the baritone cat with her umbrella.

Other failed attempts for Sylvester to get Tweety include:

- Perching himself atop a delivery truck. Just as he is about to grab dinner, the truck speeds away, requiring the cat to take the crosstown bus to return downtown. Sylvester then barely avoids getting hit by an oncoming car, causing his heart to beat fast and his fur to go white.
- Hiding inside an English gentleman's hat. The man walks up beside Granny and makes a snide remark, just as Sylvester is making a grab for Tweety. Granny uses her umbrella to clout the man and — unwitting — the cat.
- Following Granny into Lacy's Department Store (a play on Macy's) and into an elevator. The cat's tail gets stuck in the elevator door, and when he finally disembarks the elevator, his tail has been stretched from the store's eight floors.
- At J.C. Denny's (a pun on J. C. Penney), the cat snatching Granny's hat with the obvious intent of getting Tweety. Granny follows the thieving cat outside, but Sylvester makes his getaway by putting the hat on and using a balloon to float to safety ... until Tweety pops the balloon. The hat glides to the street undamaged (where Granny retrieves it), while Sylvester plummets into a manhole ("Whoo-hoo-hoo. Hey, look at this, Ralph! A pussycat!" says an Ed Norton-esque sewer worker).
- Later, using a bellows to blow Granny's hat from her head, causing it to go onto the street. Sylvester barely avoids getting hit by several cars and recovers the hat, but he is struck by a motorscooter driving from an alley. Granny manages to retrieve the hat safely.

In the ending gag, Sylvester uses a fishing rod and reel to latch onto the hat. Granny gets into a taxi, and Sylvester is pulled away by the speeding driver. After being an unwilling car skier for several city blocks (and nearly getting hit by two trucks), Sylvester eventually realizes he needs to reel himself in ... which he does to open the taxi's sunroof and grab Tweety. Just after saying his only line in the cartoon — "Now I've got you, buster!" — the car drives into the Holland Tunnel, where the cat hits his head against the side of the entrance; the bird flies out of his hand and back safely onto the taxicab's roof. "You know, I wose more puddy tats that way!" remarks Tweety as the cartoon ends.

== Score ==
A Bird in a Bonnet is one of six cartoons scored with stock music by John Seely from the Capitol Records Hi-Q library because of a musician's strike in 1958; the others are Weasel While You Work, Hip Hip-Hurry!, Hook, Line and Stinker, Gopher Broke, and Pre-Hysterical Hare. This cartoon is the only Friz Freleng cartoon to have a Seely score; two others were directed by Chuck Jones (both starring Wile E. Coyote and Road Runner), while the remaining three were helmed by Robert McKimson.

== See also ==
- List of American films of 1958
