= A Taste of Catnip =

1966 film by Robert McKimson

- Directed by: Robert McKimson
- Story by: Michael O'Connor
- Produced by: David H. DePatie; Friz Freleng
- Starring: Mel Blanc; Gonzales Gonzales
- Edited by: Lee Gunther
- Music by: Walter Greene
- Animation by: Ted Bonnicksen; Bob Matz; Manny Perez; Norm McCabe; George Grandpré; Warren Batchelder; Don Towsley (uncredited)
- Layouts by: Dick Ung
- Backgrounds by: Tom O'Loughlin
- Color process: Technicolor
- Production company: DePatie–Freleng Enterprises
- Distributed by: Warner Bros. Pictures; The Vitaphone Corporation
- Release date: December 3, 1966
- Running time: 6:25
- Language: English

A Taste of Catnip is a 1966 Warner Bros. Merrie Melodies cartoon directed by Robert McKimson. The short was released on December 3, 1966, and stars Daffy Duck and Speedy Gonzales with two cameos by Sylvester. It was the final overall theatrical classic-era Warner Bros. cartoon featuring Sylvester during the golden age of American animation.

In the film, Daffy consults a psychiatrist concerning his cat-like desires.

== Plot ==
At the Guadalajara Medical Centre, psychiatrist Dr. Manuel Jose Olvera Sebastian Rudolfo Ortiz Pancho Jimenez Perez III (Mexico's finest) describes an encounter one year ago with Daffy Duck. Daffy proceeds to tell Perez that he has been exhibiting progressively more extreme cat-like desires.

Perez discovers through a blood test that Daffy has lethal amounts of catnip in his blood, and he must discover the source. Daffy discovers that right across the street is the Continental Catnip Corp. of Chihuahua. He decides to destroy it with a rocket, ridding him of his cat-like desires but also arousing the rage of neighborhood cats, including Sylvester. Perez receives a phone call about Daffy's success, and his next patient, Speedy Gonzales, enters; he exhibits duck-like desires. Moaning, Perez claims, "Oh, I should have listened to mi padre. He wanted me to be a bandido."

== See also ==
- List of Daffy Duck cartoons
