= So Does an Automobile =

- Directed by: Dave Fleischer
- Produced by: Max Fleischer
- Starring: Margie Hines
- Music by: Sammy Timberg
- Animation by: Roland Crandall; Frank Kelling
- Color process: Black-and-white
- Production company: Fleischer Studios
- Distributed by: Paramount Pictures
- Release date: March 31, 1939
- Running time: 7 minutes
- Language: English

So Does an Automobile is a 1939 Fleischer Studios animated short film directed by Dave Fleischer and starring Margie Hines as Betty Boop.

== Synopsis ==
Betty operates an auto repair garage for sick and injured automobiles. Betty sings as she restores broken-down taxicabs, high-price limousines and restores a police car with sore and flat feet (tires) back to perfect condition again.

== Notes ==
Instrumental versions of the theme song for this cartoon were later used in Betty's next film, Musical Mountaineers, and later in the 1940 Popeye cartoon, Wimmin Hadn't Oughta Drive.
