= Pedro Gonzalez Gonzalez =

American actor (1925–2006)

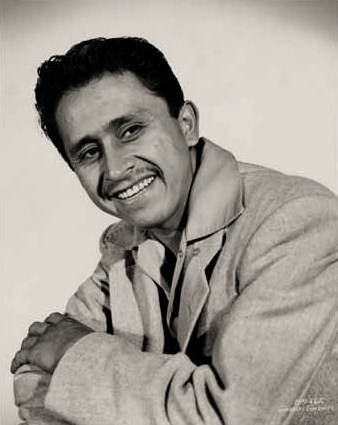
- Born: Ramiro Gonzalez-Gonzalez; May 24, 1925; Aguilares, Texas, U.S.
- Died: February 6, 2006 (aged 80); Culver City, California, U.S.
- Occupations: Actor; comedian
- Years active: 1953–1998
- Spouse: Leandra (m. 1942)
- Children: 3
- Relatives: Clifton Collins Jr. (grandson)

Pedro Gonzalez Gonzalez (born Ramiro Gonzalez Gonzalez; May 24, 1925 – February 6, 2006) was an American character actor and comedian, best known for his appearances in a number of John Wayne films.

== Life and career ==
His father was a trumpet player, and his mother was a dancer. His brother was actor Jose Gonzalez-Gonzalez (1922–2000). He left school at the age of seven to join a family act called "Las Perlitas" that toured southwest Texas. As a result, he was functionally illiterate for all of his life. As a result of his illiteracy, he memorized scripts by having his wife read them to him. Gonzalez Gonzalez married at the age of seventeen and served in the Army during World War II as a driver in the United States. After the war he performed stand-up comedy for Spanish-speaking audiences.

In 1953, he appeared on the Groucho Marx NBC television quiz show You Bet Your Life under the name Ramiro G. Gonzalez, where his banter with Marx attracted notice. Marx asked him: "What does the 'G' stand for?" to which he replied "Gonzalez", and explained that both his parents had been surnamed "Gonzalez" before being married. So Marx asked: "What does your wife call you: Ramiro or Gonzalez?" He replied "She calls me 'Pedro'", triggering rare laughter from Marx. After Gonzalez performed a 15-second comic dance to strong applause, Marx complimented his guest's comedic skill, saying: "Pedro, we could do a great act together. We could make a fortune in vaudeville, you and I. What -- what would we call our act, you know, if we went out together? 'The Two Hot Tamales'?" After Pedro deadpanned "Gonzalez Gonzalez and Marx", Marx made an aside: "That's nice billing. Two people in the act, and I get third place!"

John Wayne saw his appearance on the program and cast him as comic relief in a number of movies including The High and the Mighty, Rio Bravo and Hellfighters. He also made guest appearances in shows such as The Adventures of Ozzie & Harriet, Gunsmoke and Wanted: Dead or Alive, as well as the Jerry Lewis film, Hook, Line & Sinker. Wayne also had Burt Kennedy write a TV series for Gonzalez Gonzalez that was never made.

Gonzalez Gonzalez played extra characters behind Mel Blanc in a number of Speedy Gonzales cartoons, including "A Taste of Catnip" and "Go Go Amigo", billed generally as Gonzalez Gonzalez.

As a result of playing comic relief roles, he was accused of perpetuating negative stereotypes about Hispanic men. However, Edward James Olmos said of Gonzalez Gonzalez at the time of his death that he "inspired every Latino actor".

He died at his home of natural causes, and was survived by his wife Leandra and three children.

He is the grandfather of actor Clifton Collins Jr.

== Filmography ==
=== Film ===
- Wings of the Hawk (1953) - Tomas
- The High and the Mighty (1954) - Gonzales
- Ring of Fear (1954) - Pedro Gonzales
- Ricochet Romance (1954) - Manuel Gonzales
- Strange Lady in Town (1955) - Trooper Martinez-Martinez
- Bengazi (1955) - Kamal
- I Died a Thousand Times (1955) - Chico
- The Bottom of the Bottle (1956) - Luis Romero
- Gun the Man Down (1956) - Hotel man
- Man in the Vault (1956) - Pedro
- The Sheepman (1958) - Angelo
- Rio Bravo (1959) - Carlos Robante
- The Young Land (1959) - Deputy Santiago
- For Love or Money (1963) - Jose
- Chili Corn Corny (1965, Short) - Crows (voice) (as Gonzales Gonzales)
- Go Go Amigo (1965, Short) - Mouse (voice) (as Gonzales Gonzales)
- Daffy Rents (1966, Short) - Dr. Ben Crazy (voice) (as Gonzales Gonzales)
- A Taste of Catnip (1966, Short) - Dr. Mañuel Jose 'Olvera Sebastian Rudolfo Ortiz Pancho Jiminez Perez III (voice) (as Gonzales Gonzales)
- The Adventures of Bullwhip Griffin (1967) - Bandido
- Hostile Guns (1967) - Angel Dominguez
- Hellfighters (1968) - Hernando (uncredited)
- The Love Bug (1968) - Mexican Driver
- Hook, Line & Sinker (1969) - Perfecto
- The Love God? (1969) - Jose - Jungle Guide (uncredited)
- Chisum (1970) - Mexican Rancher
- Zachariah (1971) - Pancho the Doorman (uncredited)
- Support Your Local Gunfighter (1971) - Ortiz
- Sixpack Annie (1975) - Carmello
- Won Ton Ton, the Dog Who Saved Hollywood (1976) - Mexican Protectionist
- Charge of the Model T's (1977) - Sanchez
- Dreamer (1979) - Too
- There Goes the Bride (1980) - Mr. Ramirez
- Flush (1982) - Miguelito
- Lust in the Dust (1985) - Mexican, Hardcase Gang
- Uphill All the Way (1986) - Chicken Carlos
- Y... se hizo justicia (1986)
- Ghost Writer (1989) - Mr. Carillo
- Down the Drain (1990) - Amigo Rodriguez
- Ruby Cairo (1992) - Uncle Jorge
- The Wonderful Ice Cream Suit (1998) - Landlord (final film role)
- On the Set - Video Documentary Short for The High and the Mighty (2005)

=== Television ===
- Telephone Time - episode "Felix the Fourth" - Félix de la Caridad Carvajal y Soto (1956)
- The Sheriff of Cochise - episode "The Great Train Robbery" - Manuel Pollo (1956)
- The Adventures of Jim Bowie - episode "Ursula" - Manuel (1958)
- The Texan - "Stampede" - Pedro Vasquez - (1959)
- The Texan - "Showdown at Abilene" - Pedro Vasquez - (1959)
- The Texan - "The Reluctant Bridegroom" - Pedro Vasquez - (1959)
- The Texan - "Trouble on the Trail" - Pedro Vasquez - (1959)
- Bonanza - episode "El Toro Grande" (1960)
- Cheyenne - episode "Counterfeit Gun" - Hotel Clerk (uncredited) (1960)
- Wanted: Dead or Alive - episode "Triple Vise" - Tomas (1960)
- The Texan - "Lady Tenderfoot" - Pedro Martinez - (1960)
- Wanted: Dead or Alive - episode "Baa-Baa" - Pedro Hernandaz (1961)
- Wide Country - episode "Farewell to Margarita" - The Bus Driver (1963)
- Gunsmoke - episode "The Quest for Asa Jahn" - Bartender (1963)
- Perry Mason - episode "The Case of the Wednesday Woman" - 'Royce' Dell (1964)
- Laredo - episode "The Treasure of San Diablo" - Gonzales (1966)
- I Spy - episode "The Conquest of Maude Murdock" - Jaime (1966)
- Rango - episode "In a Little Mexican Town" - Drunk (1967)
- I Dream of Jeannie - episode "My Turned-On Master" - Pedro (1967)
- Hondo - episode "Hondo and the Death Drive" - Sancho (1967)
- The Monkees - episode "A Nice Place to Visit" - Lupe (1967)
- Laredo - episode "Scourge of San Rosa" - Liveryman (1967)
- Mayberry R.F.D. - episode "Sister Cities" - Santos (1969)
- I Dream of Jeannie - episode "See You in C-U-B-A" - Jose (1969)
- The Mod Squad - episode "Never Give the Fuzz an Even Break" - restaurant Owner (1969)
- The Bill Cosby Show - episode "The Sesame Street Rumble" - Bob (1971)
- Adam-12 - episode "Anniversary" - Rudolf Diaz (1971)
