= A Great Big Bunch of You =

1932 film by Rudolf Ising

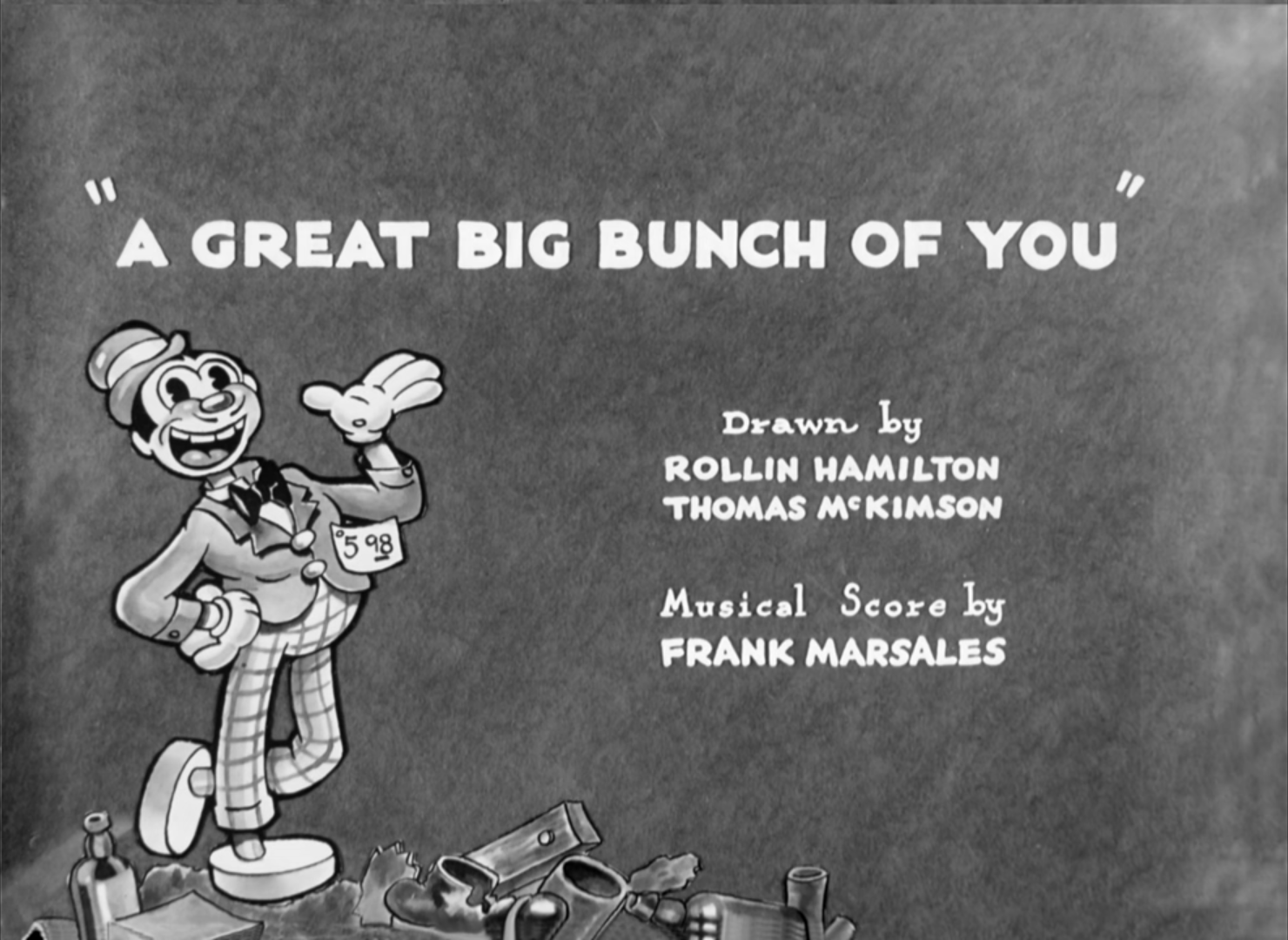
- Title card
- Directed by: Rudolf Ising
- Produced by: Hugh Harman; Rudolf Ising; Leon Schlesinger
- Music by: Frank Marsales
- Animation by: Rollin Hamilton; Thomas McKimson
- Color process: Black-and-white
- Production companies: Harman-Ising Productions; Leon Schlesinger Productions
- Distributed by: Warner Bros. Pictures; The Vitaphone Corporation
- Release date: November 12, 1932
- Running time: 7 minutes
- Country: United States
- Language: English

A Great Big Bunch of You is a 1932 American animated comedy short film directed by Rudolf Ising. It is the seventeenth film in the Merrie Melodies series, featuring the titular song by Mort Dixon and Harry Warren. The short was released on November 12, 1932.

== Plot ==
Full short

An old man disposes of trash at a landfill, including a ventriloquist's dummy, which comes to life after a cuckoo clock lands on him. He finds a broken piano, which he fixes by connecting it to an abandoned clothing rack, allowing music to be played as he sings the titular song. A pair of shoes dance to the music while he switches hats and performs imitations of Maurice Chevalier and Ted Lewis.

The other items give their applause as the dummy finds a clarinet and plays it. A grandfather clock also comes to life and dances to the music. A toy soldier regiment marches and shoots bottles of liquor, before finding a copy of Washington Crossing the Delaware, humorously sinking the boat in the painting, which George Washington and the soldiers react to by marching out of the water.

The dummy rides a magic carpet to conduct a jazz band consisting of dummies playing instruments or singing. He returns to the piano, only to be flattened by more trash disposed of by the old man, which does not faze him.

== Reception ==
The Film Daily called it a "Good Cartoon".
