= Go Go Amigo =

- Directed by: Robert McKimson
- Story by: David Detiege
- Produced by: David H. DePatie; Friz Freleng
- Starring: Mel Blanc; Gonzales Gonzales
- Edited by: Lee Gunther
- Music by: Bill Lava
- Animation by: Warren Batchelder; Bob Matz; Manny Perez
- Layouts by: Dick Ung
- Backgrounds by: George DeLado
- Color process: Technicolor
- Production company: DePatie–Freleng Enterprises
- Distributed by: Warner Bros. Pictures; The Vitaphone Corporation
- Release date: November 20, 1965
- Running time: 6 minutes
- Language: English

Go Go Amigo is a 1965 Warner Bros. Merrie Melodies cartoon directed by Robert McKimson. The short was released on November 20, 1965, and stars Daffy Duck and Speedy Gonzales.

In this film, Speedy, celebrating his 10th anniversary, needs music for his birthday party. Daffy is a shop owner who denies him the free use of his radios.

== Plot ==
Tired of the local Mexican villagers crowding around his display window to watch a running TV set, Daffy Duck (this time the owner of El Daffy's Radio and TV) turns it off and declares that, to watch TV, they must come in and buy a set.

Meanwhile, in a mousehole in his store, Speedy and his friends are celebrating his birthday. Unfortunately, one thing is missing: music. So Speedy goes into the main storeroom and turns on one of Daffy's radios.

Daffy abruptly shuts it off. Consequently, Speedy does everything in his power to have fiesta music at his party. Daffy counters the pesky rodent, right up to arming himself and invading the local radio station to make a hostage of the radio DJ, forcing him to play disagreeable Bill Lava music. Speedy races to the radio station and subdues Daffy by tying him up on a record player.

== Crew ==
- Director: Robert McKimson
- Story: David Detiege
- Animation: Warren Batchelder, Bob Matz, Manny Perez
- Layout: Dick Ung
- Backgrounds: George deLado
- Film Editor: Lee Gunther
- Voice Characterizations: Mel Blanc, Gonzales Gonzales
- Music: Bill Lava
- Produced by: David H. DePatie and Friz Freleng

== See also ==
- List of American films of 1965
- The Golden Age of American animation
- List of Daffy Duck cartoons
