= Daffy Rents =

- Directed by: Robert McKimson
- Story by: Michael O'Connor
- Produced by: David H. DePatie; Friz Freleng
- Starring: Mel Blanc; Gonzales Gonzales
- Edited by: Al Wahrman
- Music by: Irving Gertz
- Animation by: Bob Matz; Manny Perez; George Grandpré; Norm McCabe
- Layouts by: Dick Ung
- Backgrounds by: Tom O'Loughlin
- Color process: Technicolor
- Production company: DePatie–Freleng Enterprises
- Distributed by: Warner Bros. Pictures; The Vitaphone Corporation
- Release date: March 26, 1966 (USA)
- Running time: 6 minutes
- Language: English

Daffy Rents is a 1966 Warner Bros. Looney Tunes cartoon directed by Robert McKimson. The short was released on March 26, 1966, and stars Daffy Duck and Speedy Gonzales.

In this film, Daffy is hired to protect a nursing home from Speedy. He uses a robot against Speedy.

== Synopsis ==
Daffy gets called by the aptly named Dr. Ben Crazy (a parody of the then popular Ben Casey) to remove Speedy from his cats-only nursing home. To do his dirty work for him, Daffy uses his robot Herman to catch Speedy. Unfortunately, Herman proves to be no match for the mouse, (and Speedy's overgrown rat cousin, Ramon) and both he and Daffy eventually give up.

When Daffy tries to get his money after getting rid of Speedy, the temperamental Dr. Crazy throws Daffy through the window and out of the office! The cartoon then closes with Daffy remarking: "Hmmph! It's a sad state of affairs, when a mouse can make a machine turn a duck into a chicken on account of a rat. Ooh, what a revolting development!"

== Voice cast ==
- Mel Blanc voices Daffy Duck, Speedy Gonzales, Herman, First Nurse
- Gonzales Gonzales voices Dr. Ben Crazy

== See also ==
- List of American films of 1966
- The Golden Age of American animation
- List of Daffy Duck cartoons
