= Swat the Fly =

- Directed by: Dave Fleischer
- Produced by: Max Fleischer
- Starring: Mae Questel
- Animation by: Sam Stimson; David Tendlar
- Color process: Black-and-white
- Distributed by: Paramount Pictures
- Release date: April 19, 1935
- Running time: 7 minutes
- Country: United States
- Language: English

Swat the Fly is a 1935 Fleischer Studios animated short film directed by Dave Fleischer and starring Betty Boop and Pudgy the Puppy.

== Synopsis ==
While Betty tries to bake a cake, an annoying fly flies in to pester Betty and Pudgy the Pup. Betty, after failed attempts at regularly swatting a fly, desperately begins tossing gobs of extra dough at the little fly, but the fly keeps escaping. In the end, Betty catches the fly in a lump of dough, flat on Pudgy's nose, but the entire house is in shambles. Then the fly manages to free itself once more.
