= Now Hear This (film) =

- Title card
- Directed by: Chuck Jones; Maurice Noble
- Story by: John Dunn; Chuck Jones
- Starring: Mel Blanc
- Edited by: Treg Brown
- Music by: Bill Lava
- Animation by: Ben Washam; Bob Bransford
- Layouts by: Maurice Noble
- Backgrounds by: Philip DeGuard
- Color process: Technicolor
- Production company: Warner Bros. Cartoons
- Distributed by: Warner Bros. Pictures
- Release date: April 27, 1963
- Running time: 6:35
- Country: United States
- Language: English

Now Hear This is a 1963 Warner Bros. Looney Tunes cartoon directed by Chuck Jones and Maurice Noble, and written by Jones and John Dunn. The short was released on April 27, 1963. It was nominated for the Academy Award for Best Animated Short Film the following year.

== Plot ==
Satan, the Head Devil, loses his left horn, which is discovered by an elderly man in the United Kingdom and repurposed as a hearing trumpet. The man begins experiencing a series of surreal hallucinations, including bugs sounding like locomotives, butterflies creating strange patterns, and a mischievous man causing chaos. As the hallucinations become increasingly bizarre and frightening, they culminate in a gigantic explosion. Exhausted by the ordeal, the man abandons the horn for his original ear trumpet. After he leaves listening to "Rule, Britannia!", Satan appears and retrieves his missing horn, restoring it to its place with the moral: "The other fellow's trumpet always looks greener."

== Crew ==
- Directed by Chuck Jones
- Co-Director & Layouts: Maurice Noble
- Story: John Dunn & Chuck Jones
- Animation: Ben Washam & Bob Bransford
- Backgrounds: Philip DeGuard
- Vocal Effects: Mel Blanc
- Music: Bill Lava
- Sound Effects Created by Treg Brown
- Produced by David H. DePatie

== Production notes ==
The title comes from a phrase used aboard American naval ships as an instruction to cease activity and listen to the announcement that will follow.

Chuck Jones later admitted confusion about the film's direction, saying "We kind of went out into — I don't know if it was left field; it was somewhere else I didn't understand. Jack Warner wasn't the only one who didn't understand that picture. I called it 'Chuck's Revenge', because it was one of the last pictures I made, and I was trying to find some way of infuriating him."

This cartoon marked the debut of the modern abstract opening and closing sequences, a style later adopted for mid-1960s Warner Bros. shorts, predominantly produced by DePatie–Freleng Enterprises (DFE) and Warner Bros.-Seven Arts Animation. It is also notable for listing the director's name first, a rarity in the Looney Tunes series.

At the cartoon's close, a modern sequence unfolds: on a white background, the Westminster Quarters introduce the "WB" lettering, while Big Ben chimes and a bicycle horn squeaks as the words "A Warner Bros. CartOOn" appear. The two Os in "Cartoon" separate to resemble eyes. This sequence, likely emphasizing the British setting, recurs in two other cartoons (Bartholomew Versus the Wheel and Señorella and the Glass Huarache). An updated version was used for DFE-produced cartoons, featuring Bill Lava's "The Merry-Go-Round Broke Down" and a black background. This concept was Chuck Jones's idea, but he was unable to direct further cartoons with this opening due to his dismissal after involvement on Gay Purr-ee with United Productions of America (UPA). This cartoon deviates from typical Warner Bros. style, resembling more the limited animation techniques of UPA cartoons.

== Home media ==
Now Hear This is available on Warner Bros. Home Entertainment Academy Awards Animation Collection, Disc 3, on Looney Tunes Golden Collection: Volume 6, Disc 4, and on Warner Bros. Home Entertainment Academy Award-Nominated Animation: Golden Gems.
