= The Gay Anties =

- Directed by: Friz Freleng
- Story by: Michael Maltese; Tedd Pierce
- Starring: Mel Blanc
- Music by: Carl W. Stalling
- Animation by: Ken Champin; Gerry Chiniquy; Manuel Perez; Virgil Ross
- Layouts by: Hawley Pratt
- Backgrounds by: Terry Lind
- Color process: Technicolor
- Production company: Warner Bros. Cartoons
- Distributed by: Warner Bros. Pictures
- Release date: February 15, 1947
- Running time: 6 minutes 22 seconds
- Language: English

The Gay Anties is a 1947 Warner Bros. Merrie Melodies cartoon short directed by Friz Freleng and written by Michael Maltese and Tedd Pierce. The short was released on February 15, 1947. The title is a play on words for the "Gay Nineties", a phrase that references the 1890s United States.

== Plot ==
A colony of ants surreptitiously invade a young couple's park picnic in the 1890s and contrive to steal their food. The gags include a scene in which the ants, frustrated three times in their efforts to make off with a sandwich, spread mustard on the back of the girlfriend's hand and trick the boyfriend into biting it, and one in which a female ant sings an overly melodramatic song ("Time Waits for No One") which gets the other ants to run for cover.

== Releases ==
The Gay Anties was released on the laserdisc title The Golden Age of Looney Tunes in 1993. The short began streaming in HD on HBO Max in 2020, and was removed from the service in 2025. The short was released on The Beast with Five Fingers Blu-ray on October 29, 2024. It was added to Tubi on August 15, 2025. It was released on the Looney Tunes Collector's Vault: Volume 3 Blu-ray set on September 8, 2026.
