= The A-Tom-inable Snowman =

- Title card
- Directed by: Abe Levitow; Opening Sequence: Chuck Jones (uncredited)
- Story by: Bob Ogle
- Produced by: Chuck Jones
- Animation by: Ken Harris; Don Towsley; Tom Ray; Dick Thompson; Ben Washam; Philip Roman
- Color process: Metrocolor
- Production company: MGM Animation/Visual Arts
- Distributed by: Metro-Goldwyn-Mayer
- Release date: August 4, 1966
- Running time: 6:39
- Language: English

The A-Tom-inable Snowman is a 1966 animated comedy film featuring Tom and Jerry. It was directed by Abe Levitow, written by Bob Ogle and produced by Chuck Jones, with the opening scene written and directed by Jones. The title is a reference to the legendary creature, parodying the Abominable Snowman.

The main setting of the film is a log cabin in the Alps. Tom stages an accident to lure a St. Bernard dog away from Jerry. The dog eventually identifies Tom as the "victim" and attempts to revive him with a keg of brandy. A drunk Tom experiences several alcohol-induced hallucinations.

== Plot ==
This episode begins with Tom having caught Jerry in a log cabin, and trying to eat him. Before doing so, he pours salt and pepper on Jerry, who sneezes himself away from the plate due to the pepper. While looking for Jerry, Tom notices the mouse in the cuckoo clock. Tom turns the clock's hands up to 5:00 and he waves to Jerry. He does it a second time and turns it up to 4:00. Tom licks the mouse but the third time when he turns it up to 3:00, instead of Jerry, a bomb pops out. Tom swallows it without realizing it and it explodes inside his mouth, taking his teeth away from his mouth and into the clock. The credits are shown with Tom and Jerry skiing as they chase in the Alps.

Right there, the chase ends when Jerry rushes inside a cabin, as Tom does so, but with the latter getting out from the fact that the cabin has a St. Bernard dog, who is sleeping. Jerry, waving at Tom proudly, is beside the St. Bernard. Tom got frustrated after seeing it as his anger melted him almost fully to the snowy ground. But, he thought of a plan to get rid of the St. Bernard and catch Jerry. He settles his skiing equipment as if it is showing that a person is in a skiing accident. Finishing his plan, he then yells for the St. Bernard to wake up and come for Tom's diversion. With the St. Bernard woken up from Tom's yelling, he goes to the "victim" for "help". After the St. Bernard left, Jerry has no protection as Tom has the opportunity to get him. The St. Bernard then reaches the diversion and attempts to save the "victim". Not knowing it is a trick, he picks up the ski boots with the bindings and expects that the "victim" is landed much deeper. Not willing to give up, he then digs the ground to find the "victim".

In the cabin earlier, Tom chases Jerry in circles, until the mouse breaks off and runs directly near the open door outside, as Tom does also. Unbeknownst to the cat, he went too fast and is far off the cliff, with Jerry still on the ground, safe. Tom then got worried that he was stupid and then lets himself fall with a waving goodbye. As he fell, he then got rolled up into a giant snowball while being rolled down from a slope, as the end point causes him to be thrown up to the sky. Jerry then calls on the St. Bernard, who is still digging, by a whistle. The dog then stops after he hears Jerry's whistle. The mouse then points the dog to an approaching giant snowball with Tom inside. After the ball lands with Tom inside flat, the St. Bernard then attempts to save the flattened cat with a keg of brandy. After he left the cat standing, Tom fell off and "shattered" into pieces. However, he is then reconstructed by the St. Bernard with the brandy. The alcohol makes Tom drunk. He starts seeing hallucinations, like five Jerrys, which he tries to count in between hiccups. He later sees hallucinations of a hole and he seems to see countless holes. Tom hiccups to the real hole, causing him to get frozen solid, requiring the St. Bernard's assistance once again. At the end of this part, once again, Tom becomes intoxicated, causing himself to ski on his feet as he hiccups. Jerry and the dog watch at him, as they shake hands for his "cure". Tom then unintentionally bumps his head onto a tree, causing himself to be unconscious as the dog felt worried, trying to make him cure.

Inside the cabin (where the St. Bernard lives), Tom has come down with a cold as Jerry watches him, feeling worried. Tom sneezes and then asks Jerry to get some tissue near him to wipe his nose. Unbeknownst to the mouse, Tom is actually tricking Jerry by grabbing him. Tom is about to eat the mouse when the St. Bernard dog pours the boiling water on the tub, causing Tom to turn red and free Jerry as he feels it on his feet. In a high temperature, Tom jumps very high, leaping from the cabin, and landing in a faraway place. He returns to the cabin, however, because he "forgot" to get Jerry, grabbing him as he blows a raspberry to the dog before leaping off again, with Jerry. Tom escapes with Jerry to a tropical island and attempts to eat the mouse once more, but Jerry escapes again when Tom isn't looking, leaving him upset at not getting to eat Jerry, and he is knocked out by a falling coconut. Fortunately, help is on hand—the St. Bernard appears once again to revitalize Tom before he once again becomes intoxicated and meanders out to the sea with the rescue hound and Jerry waving goodbye to him and the words "The End" appear on a sun as the cartoon closes.

== Cast and additional crew ==
- Produced by Chuck Jones
- Production Supervised by Les Goldman
- Production Manager: Earl Jonas
- Mel Blanc voices Jerry (uncredited)
- Additional Voices by William Hanna & June Foray
- Music by Dean Elliott
- Layouts: Robert Givens
- Backgrounds: Robert Inman
- Animation Advisor: Maurice Noble
- MPAA Certificate Number: 21210
