= Joe Glow, the Firefly =

1941 film by Charles M. Jones

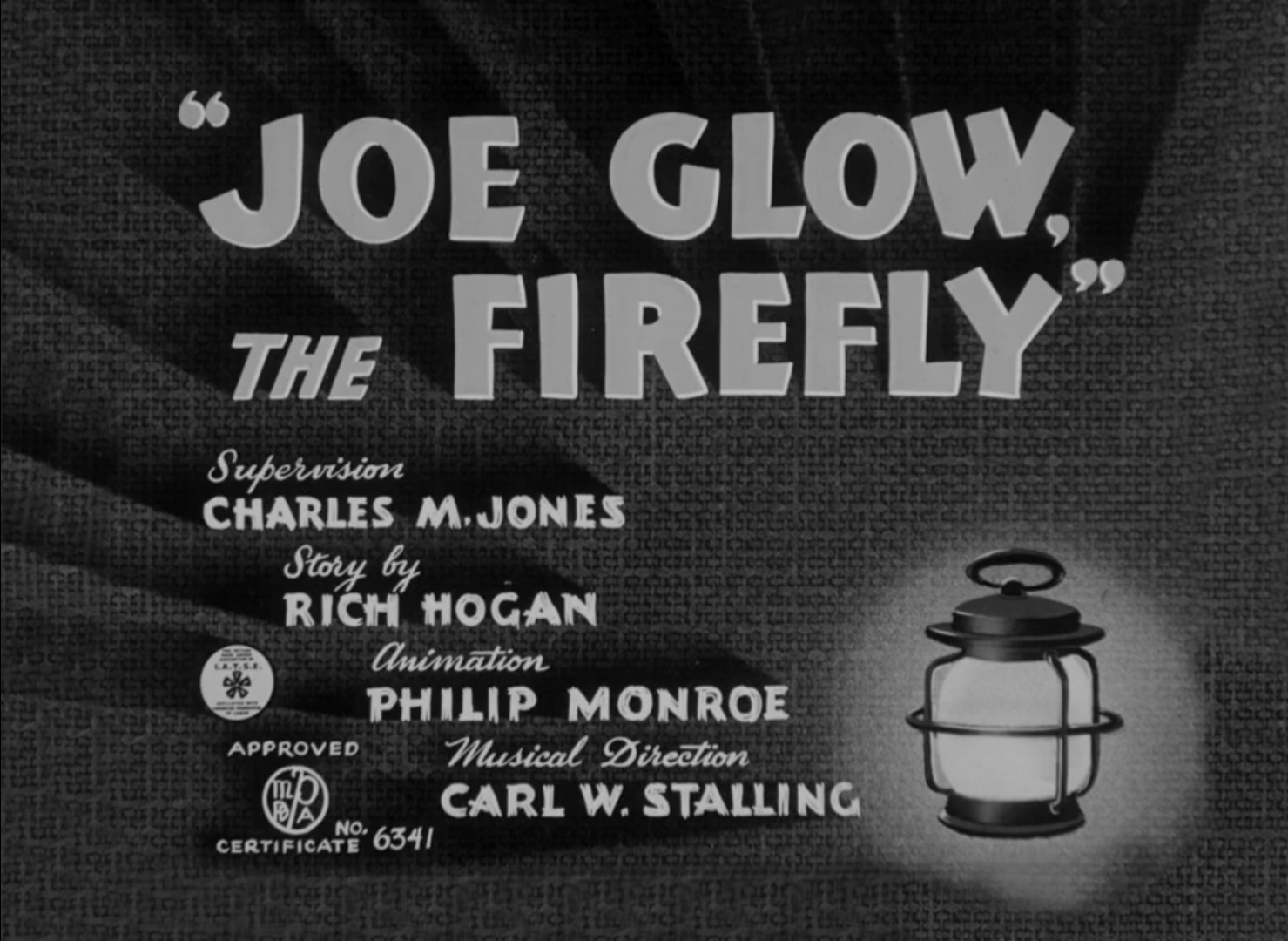
- Title card
- Directed by: Charles M. Jones
- Story by: Rich Hogan
- Produced by: Leon Schlesinger
- Starring: Mel Blanc
- Music by: Carl W. Stalling
- Animation by: Philip Monroe
- Color process: Black-and-white
- Production company: Leon Schlesinger Productions
- Distributed by: Warner Bros. Pictures
- Release date: March 8, 1941
- Running time: 7 minutes
- Country: United States
- Language: English

Joe Glow, the Firefly is a 1941 American animated comedy short film directed by Charles M. Jones. The short was released on March 8, 1941. It is part of the Looney Tunes series and the first black-and-white cartoon to be directed by Jones, who had only worked on Technicolor Merrie Melodies cartoons before.

== Plot ==
Full short in restored form

A fly carrying a lamp named Joe Glow enters a tent where a caricature of director Charles M. Jones is sleeping. Joe slips and slides all over Jones's face, unable to stay still because of Jones' movements. He accidentally disturbs Jones' sleep with a flashlight before escaping. He then investigates the food in the tent. Having looked everything over, Joe shouts "GOOD NIGHT!" into the man's ear before flying away.

== Home media ==
The short is available on disc 1 of the Looney Tunes Collector's Vault: Volume 3 Blu-ray set.

== See also ==
- List of American films of 1941
- Looney Tunes and Merrie Melodies filmography (1940–1949)
- List of animated films in the public domain in the United States
