= Baby Buggy Bunny =

1954 film by Chuck Jones

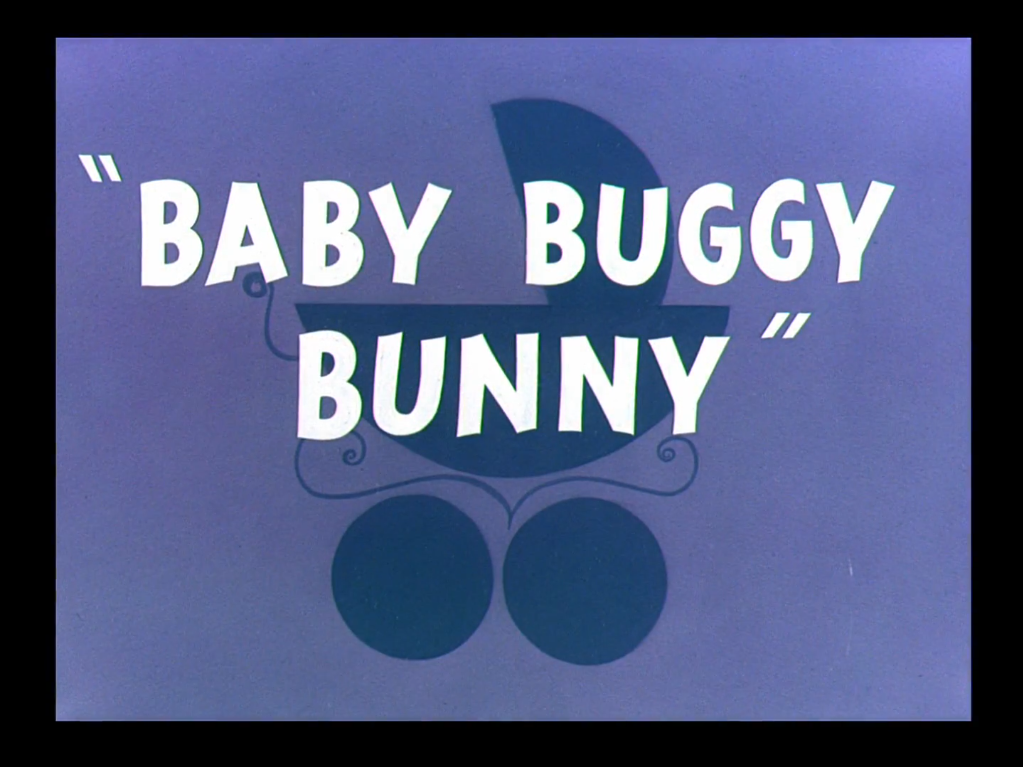
- Title card
- Directed by: Charles M. Jones
- Story by: Michael Maltese
- Starring: Mel Blanc
- Music by: Milt Franklyn
- Animation by: Ken Harris; Abe Levitow; Lloyd Vaughan; Ben Washam
- Layouts by: Ernie Nordli
- Backgrounds by: Philip DeGuard
- Color process: Technicolor
- Production company: Warner Bros. Cartoons
- Distributed by: Warner Bros. Pictures
- Release date: December 18, 1954 (USA premiere)
- Running time: 7:05
- Language: English

Baby Buggy Bunny is a 1954 Warner Bros. Merrie Melodies animated short directed by Chuck Jones and written by Michael Maltese. The cartoon was released on December 18, 1954, and stars Bugs Bunny. The story is about a short gangster named "Babyface" Finster (based on gangster Baby Face Nelson) who, after a clever bank robbery, loses his ill-gotten gains down Bugs' rabbit hole, forcing him to don the disguise of an orphan baby to get it back. The title is a play on the tongue twister "Rubber Baby Buggy Bumpers".

== Plot ==
Baby-Face Finster (a.k.a. Ant Hill Harry), a short 35-year-old man who resembles a baby, successfully robs the Last National Bank by using stilts, dark clothes, a mask and a hat to disguise his true appearance. Then, after ducking into an alleyway, doffs his disguise and dresses in baby clothing and hides in a pram with the money bag. Appearing as an innocent infant, he easily evades the pursuing police.

Unfortunately for Finster, the pram he initially hid in rolls down a hill until it hits a rock. The bag of money inside ejects and ends up in Bugs' rabbit hole. Bugs is thrilled with the windfall ("Diamond studded hutches! 14 karot carrots!")

Determined to get the money back, Finster, still in baby attire, sets himself up as an abandoned child left on Bugs' "doorstep." Bugs takes him in, and so begins the bank robber's attempts to retrieve the money and do away with the rabbit, which the brand-new "parent" simply interprets as a baby's typical mischief.

When Bugs turns off the light after putting Finster to bed, the "baby" whacks him with a baseball bat. This happens a second time. Bugs, thinking perhaps Finster is having a nightmare that is causing this behaviour, prevents it from occurring again. A supposedly remorseful Finster (in keeping up the charade) hugs him and utters, "Da-Da!", once more capturing Bugs' heart.

Later, Bugs is trying to watch TV but gets static interference on the screen. Hearing a buzzing noise in the bathroom, Bugs peeks in there and finds Finster is shaving, smoking a cigar, and sporting a tattoo reading: Maisie, Singapore, 1932. Bugs then becomes very confused and suspicious. Suddenly, the TV comes back on, and a brief news clip about the bank robbery and an APB for the robber is shown on screen; all this finally makes Bugs realize what is happening. Sneakily, Bugs turns off the TV and looks around for Finster, who is climbing a bookshelf in the living room to once more retrieve the money bag.

Bugs then plays rough with Finster, exaggerating his "baby care." He puts the robber in a washing machine to clean him up after he supposedly has played with "the dirty money." Upon removing Finster, who was still soaped up from the machine, Bugs tosses him to the ceiling. When Bugs purposefully misses him and Finster hits the floor, Bugs picks him up and Finster tries to stab him with a butcher knife, but misses and stabs himself in the rear. Rather than crying over his pain, Finster instead murmurs inaudible obscenities, causing Bugs to spank him; each hand-to-posterior connection knocks a weapon from the robber's person.

Bugs then finally ties Finster up with ropes in his basket and leaves him and the money at the police station with a note, similar to what Finster did with him. Finster does not take it well, throwing a wild temper tantrum while being locked up in a baby-sized playpen in his cell in the State Prison, angrily claiming his innocence and that he has been framed. Bugs ends the cartoon, telling the angry bank robber from the barred window, "Don't be such a crybaby. After all, 99 years isn't forever."

== Voice cast ==
- Mel Blanc as Bugs Bunny, Baby-Faced Finster, Ant Hill Harry, TV Reporter, Sergeant, and Clancy

== Legacy ==
Baby-Face Finster's mugshot appears as a background cameo in Space Jam, along with other Bugs Bunny villains Rocky and Mugsy. It also appears in The Looney Tunes Show episode "It's a Handbag."

The plot of the critically panned 2006 comedy film Little Man was similar enough to Baby Buggy Bunny to earn a Golden Raspberry Award for Worst Remake or Rip-off. Animation blog Cartoon Brew noted at least three jokes from Baby Buggy Bunny used in Little Man.

Preceded by Yankee Doodle Bugs	Bugs Bunny Cartoons; 1954	Succeeded by Beanstalk Bunny
