= Whoops! I'm a Cowboy =

- Directed by: Dave Fleischer
- Produced by: Max Fleischer
- Starring: Mae Questel; Jack Mercer
- Animation by: Thomas Johnson; David Hoffman
- Color process: Black-and-white
- Production company: Fleischer Studios
- Distributed by: Paramount Pictures
- Release date: February 12, 1937
- Running time: 7 minutes
- Country: United States
- Language: English

Whoops! I'm a Cowboy! is a 1937 Fleischer Studios animated short film starring Betty Boop.

== Synopsis ==
Betty's short weakling boyfriend Wiffle Piffle proposes to her. Betty turns him down, saying/singing she's only interested in a "bronco-busting" he-man cowboy. Wiffle sets off for a dude ranch to learn how to become a real cowboy. It doesn't work out so well.

== Notes and comments ==
The film includes the first of only two appearances by Wiffle Piffle in the Betty Boop series. His second was in The Hot Air Salesman (1937). Otherwise, Wiffle Piffle appeared only in the Screen Songs series.

== Bibliography ==
- Cabarga, Leslie (1980). Betty Boop, Popeye et Cie. L'histoire des Fleischer (en francés). Enghien: ARTEFACT SARL.
