= Rabbit Stew and Rabbits Too! =

1969 Warner Bros. theatrical cartoon short

- Directed by: Bob McKimson
- Story by: Cal Howard
- Produced by: Bill L. Hendricks
- Edited by: Hal Geer
- Music by: William Lava
- Animation by: Laverne Harding; Norm McCabe; Ted Bonnicksen; Jim Davis; Ed Solomon
- Layouts by: Bob Givens; Jaime Diaz
- Backgrounds by: Bob McIntosh
- Color process: Technicolor
- Production company: Warner Bros.-Seven Arts Animation
- Distributed by: Warner Bros.-Seven Arts; The Vitaphone Corporation
- Release date: March 15, 1969
- Running time: 6 minutes

Rabbit Stew and Rabbits Too! is a 1969 American animated comedy short film directed by Robert McKimson. It is part of the Looney Tunes series. It was the only cartoon to feature the Quick Brown Fox and Rapid Rabbit.

== Plot ==
Quick Brown Fox wants to make rabbit stew, with the elusive Rapid Rabbit as the main ingredient. To this end, he tries several different traps — simple ones at first, but they gradually become ridiculously elaborate — and all of them fail to ensnare Rapid, and some of them end up hurting Quick - some including a spring-loaded hammer set to whack Rapid when he grabs a carrot tied to the trap (Rapid struggles to grab the carrot, resulting in an impatient Quick unintentionally setting the trap off), and a "Free Trip to the Moon" via a cannon, that is also unintentionally set off by Quick - which results in him getting shot into the air and then hit on the head with a cannonball. Ultimately, Quick sets up the most elaborate trap of them all, a large Rube Goldberg-style contraption that will land Rapid into a heated frying pan, positioned next to a dining table for convenience. However, Rapid uses his horn to startle Quick, who takes a short leap backwards in surprise, lands into the contraption's trigger, and ends up suffering everything his trap has to offer, finally landing flat onto the table, breaking it apart. Rapid finishes the job by bundling Quick in the tablecloth and tying a helium balloon to the cloth’s corners, lifting Quick into the sky.
