= Skyscraper Caper =

- Directed by: Alex Lovy
- Story by: Cal Howard
- Produced by: William L. Hendricks
- Starring: Mel Blanc
- Edited by: Hal Geer
- Music by: William Lava
- Animation by: Ted Bonnicksen; Laverne Harding; Volus Jones; Ed Solomon
- Layouts by: Bob Givens
- Backgrounds by: Bob Abrams; Ralph Penn
- Color process: Technicolor
- Production company: Warner Bros.-Seven Arts Animation
- Distributed by: Warner Bros.-Seven Arts; Vitagraph Company of America
- Release date: March 9, 1968
- Running time: 6 minutes
- Language: English

Skyscraper Caper is a 1968 Warner Bros.-Seven Arts Looney Tunes cartoon directed by Alex Lovy. The short was released on March 9, 1968, and stars Daffy Duck and Speedy Gonzales. It was the penultimate cartoon in the Daffy/Speedy series, and the only one where the two are never adversaries at any point in the cartoon.

== Plot ==
One night, Daffy begins sleepwalking and leaves his house, strolls past Speedy's lakeside house, then falls into the lake itself, which wakes him up. Speedy informs him that he has been sleepwalking, which worries Daffy since "a guy could get hurt that way." Speedy offers to stay up for the night in exchange for five pesos, and promises that he will wake Daffy up if he starts sleepwalking again.

Back at Daffy's house, Speedy tells him that if he notices Daffy sleepwalking, he'll ring a bell in order to wake him up. Daffy goes to sleep, but Speedy has no intention of staying up for the whole night and ties a tripwire to the bedpost, also connecting it to the bell, so that if Daffy starts sleepwalking again the bell will wake up both Daffy and Speedy. Sure enough, Daffy begins sleepwalking and trips the bell, which wakes Speedy who then starts frantically ringing it himself to make it look like he was on guard. Afterwards, Daffy goes to sleep again, though not before Speedy makes him pay another five pesos for his continued services.

As dawn breaks, Daffy starts sleepwalking again, but this time he gets out of bed on the other side and leaves the house the other side of the bed, which fails to make the bell ring. He sleepwalks into a construction site, and ends up at the top of an under-construction skyscraper. In the meantime, Speedy finally wakes up and realizes that Daffy isn't there. Speedy then frantically leaves the house in pursuit. Using his super-speed, Speedy gets to the construction site, and gets to the top of the skyscraper just in time to prevent Daffy from falling down a hole in the girders. Daffy then nearly walks off the edge of the structure, but is woken up by the bell of an ice cream salesman at street level. He still loses his balance though, and falls partway down the structure, getting left hanging on for life. Speedy lowers a noose down to Daffy and threads it over his neck, then drops the other end down to Daffy and tells him to pull himself up with it. Daffy does so, nearly choking himself in the process, but manages to set off a jackhammer when he gets back to the top of the structure and is thrown off it again. On his way down, Daffy manages to grab onto the minute hand of a clock built into the side of another building, but then the hour hand starts traveling around extremely fast, whacking Daffy on the head, then the clock explodes and throws him into another building, where he bounces off the canopies above its windows. He grabs onto one of the canopies, but it quickly breaks off and drops him onto some telegraph lines, which he in turn bounces off of. Speedy manages to grab a wheelbarrow, and catches Daffy before he hits the ground. Daffy passes out during his final fall, and Speedy quickly wheels him back home and drops him back into his bed, which results in Daffy being convinced that the whole thing was just a nightmare when he wakes up.
