= Young and Healthy =

1933 film by Rudolf Ising

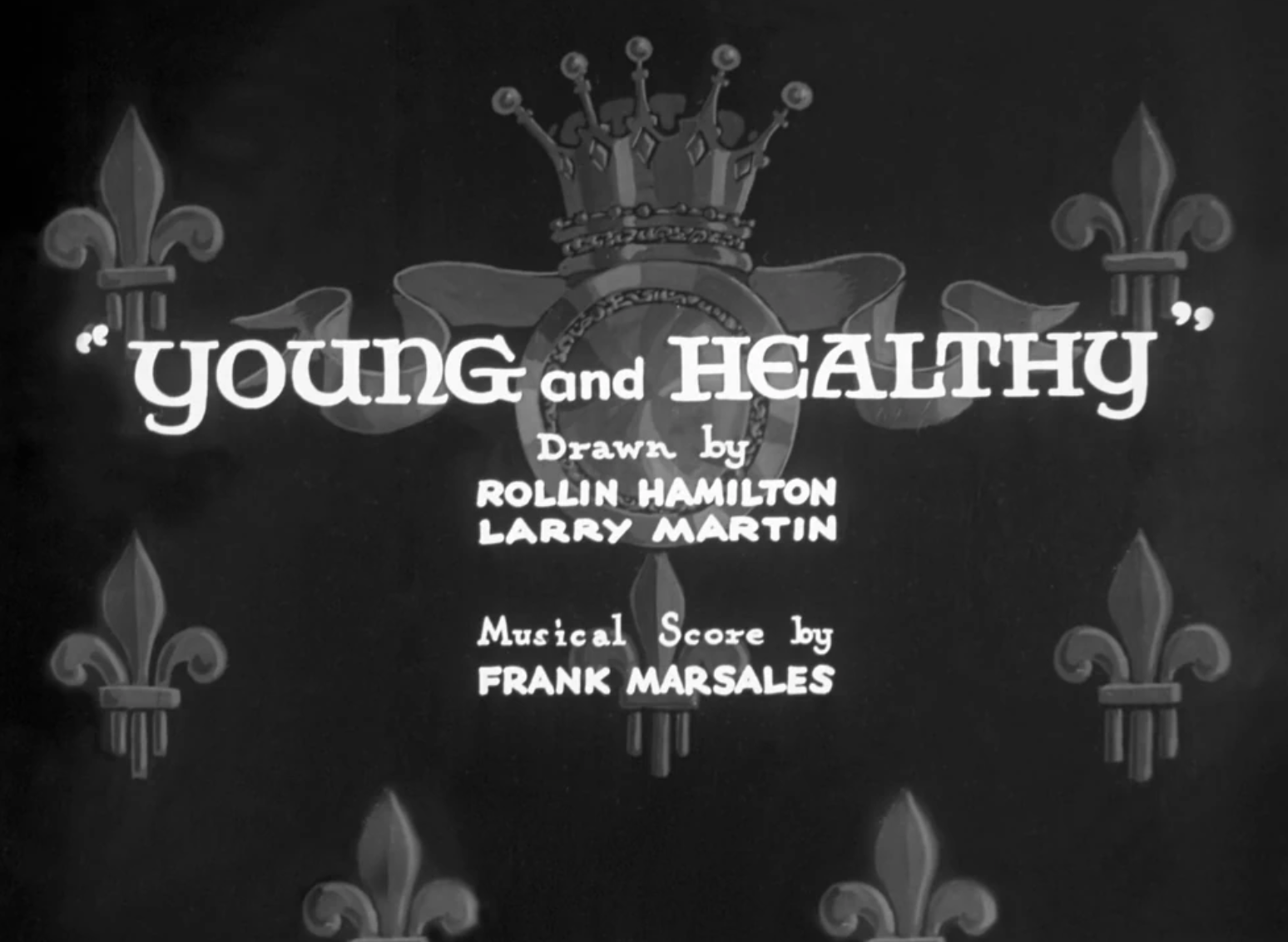
- Title card
- Directed by: Rudolf Ising
- Produced by: Hugh Harman; Rudolf Ising; Leon Schlesinger
- Music by: Frank Marsales
- Animation by: Rollin Hamilton; Larry Martin
- Color process: Black and white
- Production companies: Harman-Ising Productions; Leon Schlesinger Productions
- Distributed by: Warner Bros. Pictures; The Vitaphone Corporation
- Release date: February 23, 1933
- Running time: 7 min
- Country: United States
- Language: English

Young and Healthy is a 1933 American animated comedy short film directed by Rudolf Ising. It is the 21th film in the Merrie Melodies series. It features the titular song from the then-upcoming film 42nd Street. It was released on February 23, 1933.

== Plot ==
In a portrait of a castle, three soldiers walk down stairs while sounding a horn. Three other soldiers roll a mat down while a dachshund sweeps it with his tail. The public welcome their extremely obese king Louis as he struggles to walk down the stairs to the throne where he naps.

The old queen walks by, singing the titular song with her equally old servant, who ironically is too old to walk properly and needs a carriage. Louis is amused by a Jimmy Durante jack-in-the-box. The queen asks him if he is ready for the ball, which the guards struggle to convey until the jack-in-the-box hears it. The queen attempts to make Louis prepare to no avail, killing the jack-in-the-box when he intervenes.

Louis mourns the jack-in-the-box's death, only to find a group of children playing at a nearby village, which delights him. He runs out and slides down the stairs' handle to meet the children, who react by removing the end of the handle and have him fall into a bucket of water. He is amused by the event and walks them to the palace, enraging the queen. The queen is then humiliated by the children who unravel her dress. The king is then sent tumbling down the stairs into the pool, where he spits out water and fish like a fountain, while the children play in his room.

== Reception ==
The Film Daily called it a "fair cartoon", noting that there is "not much to it".
