= Hip Hip-Hurry! =

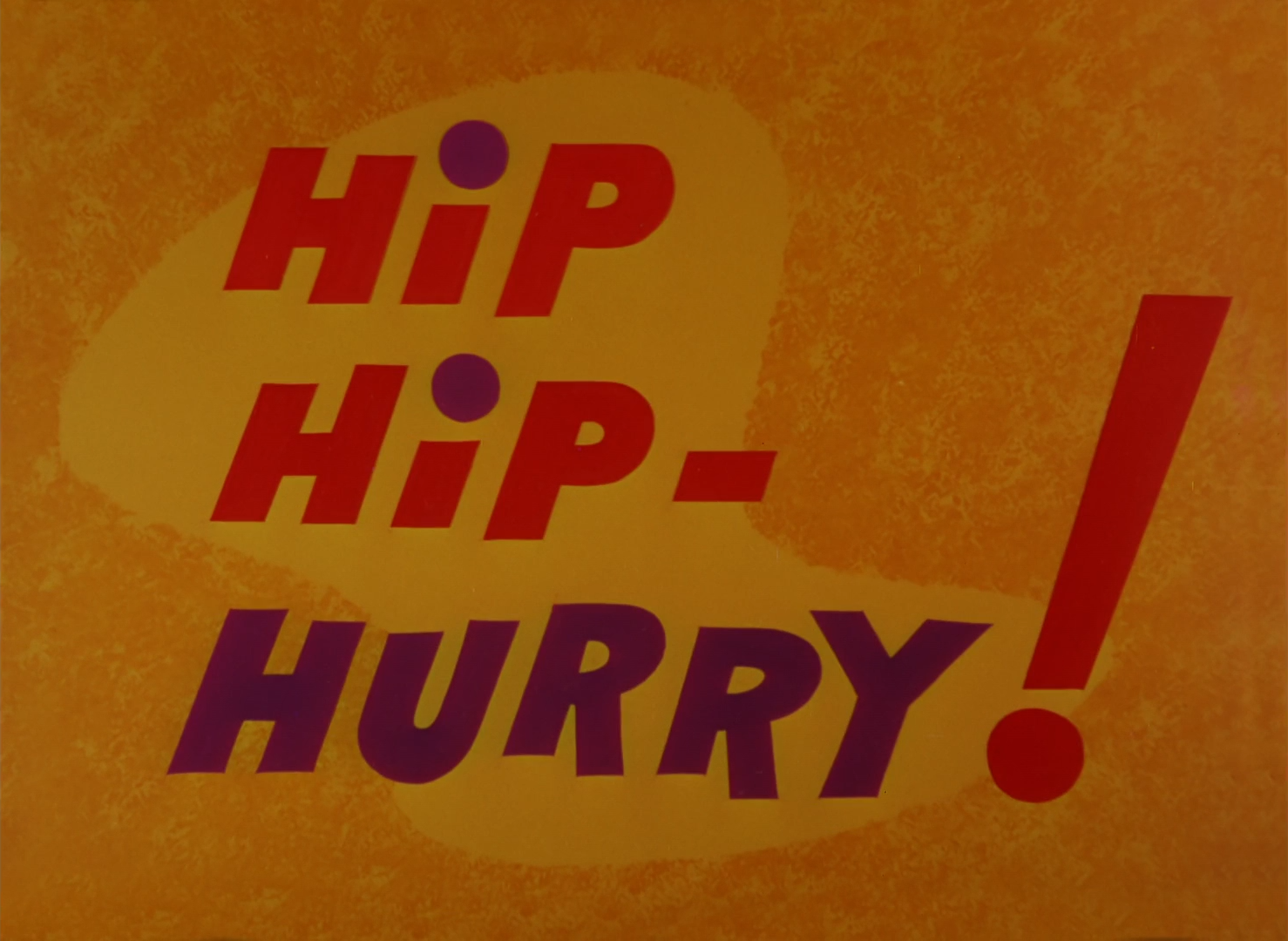
- Title card
- Directed by: Chuck Jones
- Story by: Michael Maltese
- Edited by: Treg Brown
- Music by: John Seely; William Loose; Henry Russell
- Animation by: Keith Darling; Ken Harris; Abe Levitow; Richard Thompson; Ben Washam; Harry Love (effects animation)
- Layouts by: Maurice Noble
- Backgrounds by: Phillip DeGuard
- Color process: Technicolor
- Production company: Warner Bros. Cartoons
- Distributed by: Warner Bros. Pictures; The Vitaphone Corporation
- Release date: December 6, 1958
- Running time: 6 minutes
- Country: United States

Hip Hip-Hurry! is a 1958 Warner Bros. Merrie Melodies cartoon directed by Chuck Jones. The short was released on December 6, 1958, and stars Wile E. Coyote and the Road Runner. The title is a pun on the phrase "Hip Hip Hooray!!" Road Runner and Coyote would later appear in another cartoon with a similar title, Zip Zip Hooray!

== Plot ==
Wile E. Coyote (Eatius-slobbius) relentlessly pursues the Road Runner (Digoutius-unbelievablii) across treacherous desert terrain. Their chase leads to a pivotal moment at a three-way fork, where the Road Runner's cunning navigation confounds Coyote. Subsequently, a series of comedic mishaps ensue, including failed attempts to ambush the Road Runner using hand grenades and trapeze acrobatics. Despite numerous setbacks, Coyote persists in his pursuit, employing various tactics such as slingshots, fireworks, and even motorboats.

Each endeavor ends in comical failure, with Coyote suffering humorous misfortune. Notably, his use of a high-speed tonic results in chaotic consequences; as Coyote was close to capturing Road Runner, Road Runner trips Coyote, careening out of control through a construction site and into a dynamite shed with two small bombs rolling along with him, triggering a spectacular explosion. The ensuing chaos culminates in Coyote being propelled into the night sky atop a makeshift rocket, creating a dazzling display of fireworks, along with the words "The End".

== Home media ==
This short is available on the Looney Tunes Collector's Choice: Volume 1 Blu-ray.

== See also ==
- Looney Tunes and Merrie Melodies filmography (1950–1959)
