= Musical Mountaineers =

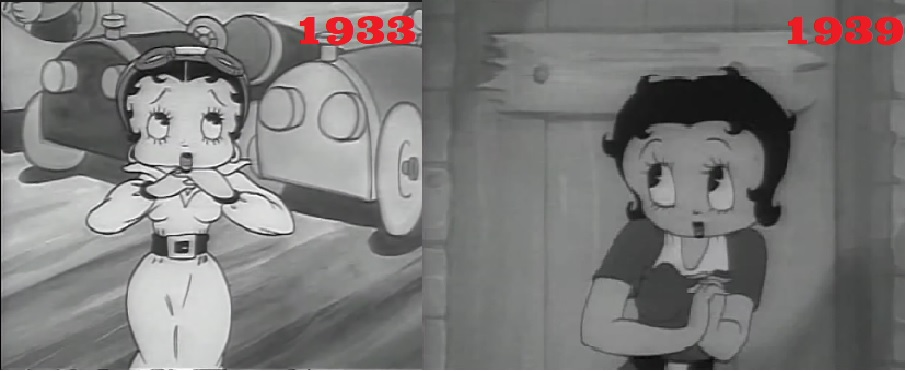
- Comparison of Betty Boop in the pre-Hays Code era (from "Betty Boop's Ker-Choo" in 1933) to Betty Boop after the Code (from "Musical Mountaineers" in 1939)
- Directed by: Dave Fleischer
- Produced by: Max Fleischer
- Starring: Margie Hines; Pinto Colvig; Jack Mercer
- Animation by: Thomas Johnson; Harold Walker
- Color process: Black-and-white
- Production company: Fleischer Studios
- Distributed by: Paramount Pictures
- Release date: May 12, 1939
- Running time: 7 minutes
- Country: United States
- Language: English

Musical Mountaineers is a 1939 Fleischer Studios animated short film starring Betty Boop.

== Synopsis ==
Betty Boop's automobile runs out of gasoline while driving through hillbilly country. When she goes up to a nearby shack to ask for help, landowner Zonk Peters and his family are suspicious of the stranger, mistaking her for an attacking Hatfield, but Betty wins them with her dancing. Soon, the entire Peters clan are making music and dancing. Betty's new friends help her on her way by filling her gas tank with a jug of "corn dripp'ns".
