= Hook, Line and Stinker =

- Title card
- Directed by: Chuck Jones
- Story by: Michael Maltese
- Edited by: Treg Brown
- Music by: John Seely
- Animation by: Richard Thompson; Ken Harris; Ben Washam
- Layouts by: Philip DeGuard
- Backgrounds by: Philip DeGuard
- Color process: Technicolor
- Production company: Warner Bros. Cartoons
- Distributed by: Warner Bros. Pictures
- Release date: October 11, 1958; (with The Old Man and the Sea)
- Running time: 6 minutes
- Country: United States

Hook, Line and Stinker is a 1958 Warner Bros. Looney Tunes cartoon directed by Chuck Jones. The short was released on October 11, 1958 with The Old Man and the Sea, and stars Wile E. Coyote and the Road Runner. The title is a pun on the expression "hook, line and sinker", which means to have been deceived or tricked.

Due to a musicians' strike, this is one of a handful of Warner Bros. cartoon shorts that used stock music from John Seely.

== Plot ==
The familiar chase between Wile E. Coyote (also known as "Famishius-Famishius"), and the Road Runner (or "Burnius-Roadibus"), unfolds with its classic slapstick humor.

1. Coyote sets a trap with a washtub and dynamite, but ends up encased in a tube from the explosion.
2. Attempting to bash the Road Runner with a sledgehammer, The end falls out with Coyote getting repeatedly bashed himself by the stick due to mishap.
3. ACME bird seed on railroad tracks leads to Coyote being flattened by a passing train.
4. Coyote's attempt to catch Road Runner with a harpoon attached to a balloon backfires as he gets struck by lightning.
5. Dynamite trap backfires as Coyote ends up blown up by his own detonator.
6. Using a piano suspended by a rope, Coyote's plan fails as he ends up with piano keys for teeth after the piano drops on him.
7. An intricate Rube Goldberg-style contraption sets off a cannon intended for Road Runner, but the cannonball plummets on top of the unsuspecting Coyote instead of the curious Road Runner. After the Coyote is bashed into the ground, the words "The End" appear on the cannonball.

== Home media ==
- VHS - Auntie Mame (A Night At The Movies issue)
- VHS - Wile. E. Coyote Vs. Road Runner: The Classic Chase
- VHS - Chariots of Fur
- VHS - The Stars Of Space Jam: Road Runner and Wile E. Coyote
- DVD - Looney Tunes Golden Collection: Volume 6

== See also ==
- Looney Tunes and Merrie Melodies filmography (1950–1959)
