= List of Looney Tunes feature films =

Since the 1970s, the Looney Tunes franchise has spawned many feature films, either released in theaters or direct-to-video.

== Theatrical films ==
=== Compilation films ===
All directed by Friz Freleng except where noted. All on DVD except where noted.

| Title | Release date | Included shorts | Notes |
|---|---|---|---|
| Bugs Bunny: Superstar | December 19, 1975 | What's Cookin' Doc?; A Wild Hare; A Corny Concerto; I Taw a Putty Tat; Rhapsody Rabbit; Walky Talky Hawky; My Favorite Duck; Hair-Raising Hare; The Old Grey Hare | Directed by Larry Jackson. The only Looney Tunes compilation film with no new animation; bridging sequences are all live-action documentary. Only Looney Tunes film originally distributed by United Artists. Included on Looney Tunes Golden Collection: Volume 4 as a special feature, then as a standalone release through the Warner Archive Collection. |
| The Bugs Bunny/Road Runner Movie | September 28, 1979 | Hare-Way to the Stars; Duck Dodgers in the 24½th Century; Robin Hood Daffy; Duck Amuck; Bully for Bugs; Ali Baba Bunny; Rabbit Fire; For Scent-imental Reasons; Long Haired Hare; What's Opera, Doc?; Operation: Rabbit; With clips from: Rabbit Seasoning; Hip Hip-Hurry!; Zoom and Bored; To Beep or Not to Beep; Zip 'N Snort; Guided Muscle; Stop! Look! And Hasten!; Wild About Hurry; Going! Going! Gosh!; Zipping Along; Whoa, Be-Gone!; Hot-Rod and Reel!; There They Go-Go-Go!; Scrambled Aches; Fast and Furry-ous; Gee Whiz-z-z-z-z-z-z; Hopalong Casualty; Beep Prepared | Directed by Chuck Jones and Phil Monroe. Released as part of Looney Tunes 2-Movie Collection DVD set. |
| The Looney Looney Looney Bugs Bunny Movie | November 20, 1981 | Knighty Knight Bugs; Hare Trimmed; Roman Legion-Hare; Sahara Hare; Wild and Woolly Hare; The Unmentionables; Golden Yeggs; Catty Cornered; Three Little Bops; Birds Anonymous; High Diving Hare; Show Biz Bugs; With clips from: A Pizza Tweety Pie; Little Red Rodent Hood; Speedy Gonzales; Satan's Waitin'; Devil's Feud Cake | Released on single disc DVD of same name. |
| Bugs Bunny's 3rd Movie: 1001 Rabbit Tales | November 19, 1982 | Cracked Quack; Apes of Wrath; Ali Baba Bunny; Tweety and the Beanstalk; Bewitched Bunny; Goldimouse and the Three Cats; A Sheep in the Deep; Red Riding Hoodwinked; The Pied Piper of Guadalupe; One Froggy Evening; With clips from: Wise Quackers; Mexican Boarders; Aqua Duck | Released as part of Looney Tunes 2-Movie Collection DVD set. |
| Daffy Duck's Fantastic Island | August 5, 1983 | Captain Hareblower; Stupor Duck; Greedy For Tweety; Banty Raids; Louvre Come Back to Me!; Tree for Two; Curtain Razor; A Mouse Divided; Of Rice and Hen; Lovelorn Leghorn; From Hare to Heir | Released on single disc DVD of same name. |
| Daffy Duck's Quackbusters | September 24, 1988 | The Night of the Living Duck; Daffy Dilly; Hyde and Go Tweet; Claws for Alarm; The Duxorcist; Transylvania 6-5000; The Abominable Snow Rabbit; With clips from: The Prize Pest; Water, Water Every Hare; Punch Trunk; Jumpin' Jupiter | Directed by Greg Ford and Terry Lennon. Released on single disc DVD of same name, and also released on Blu-ray via the Warner Archive Collection. |
| The Looney Tunes Hall of Fame | November 13, 1991 | A Wild Hare; Birdy and the Beast; Bugs Bunny Rides Again; Rabbit Seasoning; Feed the Kitty; One Froggy Evening; Duck Amuck; Another Froggy Evening; Fast and Furry-ous; What's Opera, Doc?; Ali Baba Bunny; Knighty Knight Bugs; High Diving Hare; Bully for Bugs; Rabbit of Seville | No new animation, not on DVD but individual shorts are for most part. |

=== Original films ===
| # | Title | Release date | Co-production with | Animation services |
|---|---|---|---|---|
| 1 | Space Jam^{[S]} | November 15, 1996 | Warner Bros. Family Entertainment; Warner Bros. Feature Animation; Northern Lights Entertainment; Courtside Seats Productions | Main facility Bardel Entertainment; Stardust Pictures; Heart of Texas Productions; Character Builders; Chuck Gammage Animation; Premier Films Ltd. Rees / Leiva Productions; Spaff Animation; Uli Meyer Features |
| 2 | Looney Tunes: Back in Action^{[S]} | November 14, 2003 | Warner Bros. Feature Animation; Baltimore/Spring Creek Productions; Goldmann Pictures; Lonely Film Productions GmbH & Co. KG | Main facilities Yowza! Animation; Mercury Filmworks |
| 3 | Space Jam: A New Legacy^{[S]} | July 16, 2021^{[H]} | Warner Animation Group; Proximity Media; SpringHill Entertainment | Company 3 Animation; Tonic DNA; Industrial Light and Magic |
| 4 | The Day the Earth Blew Up | March 14, 2025 | Warner Bros. Animation (distributed by Ketchup Entertainment) | Main facilities Tonic DNA; Snipple Animation Studios; Titmouse, Inc. Dinamita Animación; Tomavision Studio; RatBat Studios |
| 5 | Coyote vs. Acme^{[S]} | August 28, 2026 | Warner Bros. Pictures (Note: Warner Bros. Pictures receives studio credit, and is the copyright holder and the co-distributor of the film.); Warner Animation Group (Note: Warner Bros. Pictures Animation used the Warner Animation Group logo as the film completed production before the studio changed to its current name. It is jokingly listed as a wholly owned subsidiary of the Acme Corporation.); Troll Court Entertainment; Keylight Pictures (distributed by Ketchup Entertainment) | DNEG; Duncan Studio |
| TBA | Untitled Bugs Bunny film | TBA | Warner Bros. Pictures Animation | TBA |
| TBA | Untitled Speedy Gonzales film | TBA | Warner Bros. Pictures Animation | TBA |
| TBA | Untitled Ocean's 11-inspired film | TBA | Warner Bros. Pictures Animation | TBA |

== Direct-to-video films ==
All titles below are available on DVD.

| # | Title | Release date | Co-production with | Notes |
|---|---|---|---|---|
| 1 | Tiny Toon Adventures: How I Spent My Vacation | March 11, 1992 | Amblin Entertainment | |
| 2 | Tweety's High-Flying Adventure | September 12, 2000 | Warner Bros. Family Entertainment | |
| 3 | Baby Looney Tunes' Eggs-traordinary Adventure | February 11, 2003 | Warner Bros. Family Entertainment | |
| 4 | Bah, Humduck! A Looney Tunes Christmas | November 14, 2006 | Warner Bros. Family Entertainment | |
| 5 | Looney Tunes: Rabbits Run | August 4, 2015 | | |
| 6 | King Tweety | June 14, 2022 | | |
| 7 | Taz: Quest for Burger | June 6, 2023 | | |

== Cancelled and unproduced films ==
Several Looney Tunes films have been in development over the years. Listed below are projects that would be scrapped at some point during development.

| Title | Notes |
|---|---|
| Original Space Jam sequel and spin-offs | Prior to the development of Space Jam: A New Legacy, the project was intended to be a direct sequel to the 1996 original, with development beginning shortly after that film's release. The proposed sequel would have involved a new basketball competition with Michael Jordan and the Looney Tunes against a new alien villain named Berserk-O!. Artist Bob Camp was tasked with designing Berserk-O! and his henchmen. Joe Pytka would have returned to direct while Cervone and his creative partner Spike Brandt signed on to direct the animation sequences. However, Jordan did not agree to star in a sequel, and Warner Bros. eventually cancelled plans for the film. Several potential spin-offs, including Spy Jam with Jackie Chan (a project that would end up becoming the basis for Looney Tunes: Back in Action), Race Jam with Jeff Gordon, Golf Jam with Tiger Woods, and Skate Jam with Tony Hawk were all discussed but never came to be. |
| Untitled Marvin the Martian film | July 29, 2008, Warner Bros. Pictures and Alcon Entertainment announced plans for a Marvin the Martian live-action/animated film, starring Mike Myers as the voice of Marvin and Christopher Lee as Santa Claus. The film would have involved Marvin trying to destroy the Earth during Christmas by becoming a competitor of Santa Claus but being prevented from accomplishing his goal when Santa wraps him inside a gift box. Alcon compared the project to other films such as Racing Stripes and My Dog Skip. It was initially scheduled for an October 7, 2011 release, but the movie was later taken off the schedule and no information has been disclosed since. Test footage of the film and the Eddie Murphy vehicle Hong Kong Phooey was leaked on December 28, 2012. |
| Pepé Le Pew: The City of Lights | In October 2010, it was reported that Mike Myers would voice Pepé Le Pew in a feature-length live-action/animated film based on the character. In July 2016, it was revealed at San Diego Comic-Con that Max Landis was writing a fully-animated Pepé Le Pew feature film for Warner Bros. Pictures. The movie was titled Pepé Le Pew: The City of Lights and the film's script was leaked online. Artists have published concept art for the film. The movie was cancelled due to sexual assault allegations against Landis in 2017. |
| Bye Bye Bunny (Note: Promoted as Bye Bye Bunny: A Looney Tunes Musical) | On June 15, 2022, Warner Bros. Animation announced during the Annecy International Animation Film Festival that they would produce a musical Looney Tunes film titled Bye Bye Bunny: A Looney Tunes Musical, initially set to be released on HBO Max and Cartoon Network. On August 22, it was announced that it would not be moving forward on the service and would be shopped elsewhere. On September 17, it was reported that the entire production team of the film had been laid off, as the film had been put on hold to be retooled into a full-fledged musical. In 2024, many artists who worked on the film affirmed that it was quietly canceled, but TheWrap reported in January 2026 that Warner Bros. Animation was looking to "revisit the concept" in the near future. Eric Bauza worked on pre-production of the film before his death, having provided the voice for Daffy Duck. |
| Hit or Miss | After the success of Space Jam, Warner Bros. Pictures started to become open to more Looney Tunes movies. However, none of the films pitched at the time were ever seriously considered to be made into actual films and as such never went into production. One such case was Hit or Miss, pitched in the late 1990s by Tim Cahill as a parody of the film Some Like It Hot with Bugs Bunny and Daffy Duck in the Joe/Jerry role and Jack Nicholson in the Spats role alongside several Looney Tunes villains such as Gossamer, Babyface Finster, Blacque Jacque Shellacque, Rocky and Mugsy, the Eskimo hunter from Frigid Hare, The Crusher and Gruesome Gorilla. Cahill notably found the sequences where Bugs and Daffy dressed up in drag to fool their adversaries amusing, and thought that a film based on that concept would be interesting. |
| Untitled reboot | In September 2012, it was announced that Jenny Slate was writing a feature reboot for the series set in the Acme Warehouse. The film was being produced by David Katzenberg, Seth-Grahame Smith and David Heyman. On August 27, 2014, writers Ashley Miller and Zack Stentz were hired to script the film, directors Glenn Ficarra and John Requa were in talks to direct the film, while actor Steve Carell was rumored to be starring in a lead role. By October 2014, the project was no longer in the works. |
| Varsity Bugs | In 2018, Brian Lynch revealed that he had sold a script to Warner Bros. titled Varsity Bugs. The film was to follow the Looney Tunes as they learn that, due to an obscure clause in their Warner Bros. contracts, they have to work to get a high school diploma. In order to get qualified, the Tunes go back to school along with fellow contract players Batman and Keanu Reeves. |

== Box office ==
| Film | Release date | Revenue | | | Rank | | Budget |
| Film | Release date | United States | Other territories | Worldwide | All-time domestic | All-time worldwide | Budget |
|---|---|---|---|---|---|---|---|
| Bugs Bunny's 3rd Movie: 1001 Rabbit Tales | November 19, 1982 | $78,350 | | $78,350 | #12,373 | #21,478 | |
| 1995 Bugs Bunny Film Festival | May 5, 1995 | $19,587 | | $19,587 | | | |
| Space Jam | November 15, 1996 | $90,418,342 | $140,000,000 | $230,418,342 | #852 | #625 | $80,000,000 |
| 1998 Bugs Bunny Film Festival | February 13, 1998 | $413,076 | | $413,076 | | | |
| Looney Tunes: Back in Action | November 14, 2003 | $20,991,364 | $47,523,480 | $68,514,844 | #3,569 | #2,685 | $80,000,000 |
| Space Jam: A New Legacy | July 16, 2021 | $70,528,072 | $92,300,000 | $162,828,072 | #2,719 | #2,673 | $150,000,000 |
| The Day the Earth Blew Up | March 14, 2025 | $8,875,344 | $6,613,841 | $15,142,875 | #2,827 | | $15,000,000 |
| Coyote vs. Acme | August 28, 2026 | | | $126,000,000 | | | $70,000,000 |
| Total | | $191,324,135+ | $286,437,321+ | $603,415,146 | | | $310,000,000 |
List indicator^{(A)} indicates the adjusted totals based on current ticket prices (calculated by Box Office Mojo).

== See also ==
- Looney Tunes and Merrie Melodies filmography
- Looney Tunes
- Merrie Melodies
- Looney Tunes Golden Collection
- List of Looney Tunes television series
- List of Looney Tunes television specials
