= The Bugs Bunny/Road Runner Movie =

1979 animated feature film directed by Chuck Jones

- Theatrical release poster
- Directed by: Chuck Jones; Phil Monroe; Classic Cartoons: Chuck Jones; Maurice Noble; Tom Ray
- Screenplay by: Chuck Jones; Michael Maltese
- Story by: Michael Maltese
- Based on: Bugs Bunny by Tex Avery; Chuck Jones; Bob Givens; Robert McKimson
- Produced by: Chuck Jones
- Starring: Mel Blanc; Stan Freberg; Paul Julian; Nicolai Shutorev; Arthur Q. Bryan
- Edited by: Treg Brown
- Music by: Dean Elliott; Milt Franklyn; Carl W. Stalling; William Lava; John Seely
- Production company: Chuck Jones Enterprises
- Distributed by: Warner Bros.
- Release date: September 28, 1979
- Running time: 98 minutes
- Country: United States
- Language: English

The Bugs Bunny/Road Runner Movie (originally entitled as The Great American Chase) is a 1979 American animated comedy package film directed by Chuck Jones, consisting of a compilation of classic Looney Tunes/Merrie Melodies shorts (specifically those that Jones himself directed) and newly animated bridging sequences hosted by Bugs Bunny. The bridging sequences, which had been produced in 1978, show Bugs at his home, which is cantilevered over a carrot-juice waterfall (modeled on Frank Lloyd Wright's "Fallingwater" house in Bear Run, Pennsylvania). The film was released to celebrate the 40th anniversary of Bugs Bunny.

== Plot ==
Bugs Bunny gives a tour of his mansion while discussing the history of cartoon comedy. He recalls his encounters with recurring adversaries and discusses early contributors to cartoon comedy, focusing on the chase sequences and slapstick humour featured in Looney Tunes cartoons.

Throughout the tour, snippets from classic shorts highlight rivalries from the Looney Tunes series. The final segment of the tour follows Wile E. Coyote and the Road Runner, blending snippets from multiple shorts into one pursuit.

As the tour concludes, Bugs looks out into the night sky, watching the constellations of Road Runner and Coyote engaged in their eternal chase.

=== Cartoons in order of appearance ===
==== Cartoons with Bugs Bunny and others ====
- Rabbit Seasoning (one brief scene only)
- Hare-Way to the Stars
- Duck Dodgers in the 24½th Century
- Robin Hood Daffy (shortened)
- Duck Amuck
- Bully for Bugs
- Ali Baba Bunny
- Rabbit Fire
- For Scent-imental Reasons (shortened)
- Long-Haired Hare (shortened)
- What's Opera, Doc?
- Operation: Rabbit (shortened)

==== Road Runner & Wile E. Coyote montage ====
- Hip Hip-Hurry! (Intro chase scene with mock-Latin names, the audio shot of dizzy and thinking Wile E. Coyote and the boulder attempt)
- Zoom and Bored (The scene where Wile E. gets tricked off a cliff and uses a jackhammer)
- To Beep or Not to Beep (lasso and catapult scenes)
- Zip 'N Snort (Human bow and arrow and the giant cannon scenes)
- Guided Muscle (Human bow and arrow scene and the slingshot scene)
- Stop! Look! And Hasten! (The road-wall scenes, ACME bird seed on bridge scene and the ACME leg muscle vitamins scene)
- Wild About Hurry (ACME giant rubber band scene)
- Going! Going! Gosh! (Slingshot scene and Wile E. Coyote disguising himself as a woman scene)
- Zipping Along (Human-cannonball scene and the wrecking ball scene)
- Whoa, Be-Gone! (Teeter-totter scene, the trampoline scene and the high wire structure and dons a wheel-head scene)
- Hot-Rod and Reel! (Trampoline scene)
- There They Go-Go-Go! (Rock avalanche scene)
- Scrambled Aches (Spring coil scene)
- Fast and Furry-ous (ACME super outfit scene)
- Gee Whiz-z-z-z-z-z-z (ACME Bat-Man's outfit scene)
- Hopalong Casualty (Earthquake pills scene)
- Beep Prepared (The ending scene where Wile E. uses an ACME little-giant do-it-yourself rocket sled)

== Voice cast ==
- Mel Blanc – Bugs Bunny, Daffy Duck, Porky Pig, Marvin The Martian, Wile E. Coyote, Pepe Le Pew, Dr. I.Q High, Hassan
- Paul Julian – The Road Runner (archive sound)
- Arthur Q. Bryan – Elmer Fudd (archive sound)
- Nicolai Shutorev – Giovanni Jones (singing voice) (archive sound)
- Charlie Dog, The Instant Martians, Penelope Pussycat, and El Toro are seen but do not speak

== Release ==
The film was released between April–May 1979 in some test markets as The Great American Chase. The film was shown at the 17th New York Film Festival on September 29, 1979, at Alice Tully Hall. The film opened at the Guild 50th Theatre on September 30, 1979. It set an opening-day record at the theater with a gross of $6,280.

=== Television ===
It aired on HBO, CBS, Disney Channel and Cartoon Network.

=== Home media ===
WCI Home Video debuted The Bugs Bunny/Road Runner Movie in VHS and Betamax formats in 1979, as part of its initial 20-title release (catalog number WB-1003). It was reissued in 1981 and also on CED the same year. In 1983, a corrected version was released by Warner Home Video on VHS and Betamax to address previous time-compression issues. Subsequent releases in 1986 reverted to time-compression until 1997.

On February 3, 1998, the film was re-released on VHS and LaserDisc as part of Warner Bros.' 75th Anniversary VHS promotion. It was included in the Looney Tunes Movie Collection DVD set alongside Bugs Bunny's 3rd Movie: 1001 Rabbit Tales in 2005.

The film is available for purchase or rental on the Apple iTunes Store and has been featured on Netflix, both offering remastered HD quality. Additionally, it can be streamed or downloaded in HD on Google Play, Amazon Prime Video, Microsoft Store, Movies Anywhere, Fandango, and Xfinity.
