= The Looney Tunes Hall of Fame =

- Theatrical poster
- Production company: Warner Bros. Pictures
- Distributed by: Kit Parker Films
- Release date: November 13, 1991
- Country: United States
- Language: English

The Looney Tunes Hall of Fame is a 1991 feature film compilation of 15 classic animated short subjects from Warner Bros. Cartoons. The line-up of cartoons included in this anthology were A Wild Hare (1940), Birdy and the Beast (1944), Bugs Bunny Rides Again (1948), Rabbit Seasoning (1952), Feed the Kitty (1952), One Froggy Evening (1955), Duck Amuck (1953), Another Froggy Evening (1995), Fast and Furry-ous (1949), Ali Baba Bunny (1957), Knighty Knight Bugs (1958), High Diving Hare (1949), Bully for Bugs (1953) and Rabbit of Seville (1950). The Looney Tunes Hall of Fame offered audiences an opportunity to see the cartoons in a 35mm theatrical presentation.
