= Bugs Bunny's 3rd Movie: 1001 Rabbit Tales =

1982 animated feature film

- Theatrical release poster
- Directed by: Friz Freleng (uncredited)
- Story by: John Dunn; Dave Detiege; Friz Freleng
- Based on: Bugs Bunny by Tex Avery; Chuck Jones; Bob Givens; Robert McKimson
- Produced by: Friz Freleng
- Starring: Mel Blanc; June Foray; Shepard Menken; Lennie Weinrib; Bea Benaderet; Arthur Q. Bryan
- Cinematography: Nick Vasu
- Edited by: Jim Champin
- Music by: Rob Walsh
- Production company: Warner Bros. Animation
- Distributed by: Warner Bros.
- Release date: November 19, 1982
- Running time: 77 minutes
- Country: United States
- Language: English
- Box office: $78,350 (domestic)

Bugs Bunny's 3rd Movie: 1001 Rabbit Tales (also known as Bugs Bunny's 1001 Rabbit Tales) is a 1982 American animated fantasy comedy film produced and directed by Friz Freleng. It combines classic Warner Bros. cartoon shorts with new animation.

== Plot ==
Bugs Bunny and Daffy Duck assume roles as sales representatives for the Rambling House Publishing Company, competing for a prestigious grand prize awarded to the top-performing salesman. Each assigned to different locales — Bugs to Pismo Beach, California and Daffy to Thermopolis — the two embark on separate journeys characterized by a series of absurd and humorous encounters.

Daffy's misadventures commence when he inadvertently crashes into Porky Pig's residence during a winter storm, seeking refuge after destroying a stuffed duck. Meanwhile, Bugs finds himself in a jungle and adopts the guise of a baby ape to evade danger. Their paths converge as they reunite and venture towards Pismo Beach, only to stumble upon a cave filled with treasure in a dry desert.

Bugs subsequently finds himself coerced into entertaining Sultan Yosemite Sam's spoiled son, Prince Abba-Dabba, with a series of parodied fairy tales. Despite attempts to escape, Bugs remains ensnared in the storytelling duties, while Daffy, in pursuit of riches, encounters a magic lamp in the cave. His attempt to exploit the lamp for profit backfires when a genie emerges, prompting Daffy's chaotic flight through the desert in search of water.

Bugs devises a clever escape plan involving a ruse with boiling oil, allowing him to elude Sam's clutches and reunite with Daffy. However, Daffy's eagerness to exploit the palace for book sales results in further misfortune. Bugs and Daffy ultimately depart into the sunset, with Daffy stripped of his feathers.

== Featured shorts ==
The following films were featured in Bugs Bunny's 3rd Movie: 1001 Rabbit Tales:

- Cracked Quack
- Apes of Wrath
- Wise Quackers
- Ali Baba Bunny
- Tweety and the Beanstalk
- Bewitched Bunny
- Goldimouse and the Three Cats
- A Sheep in the Deep
- Red Riding Hoodwinked
- The Pied Piper of Guadalupe & Mexican Boarders
- One Froggy Evening
- Aqua Duck

== Notes ==
- Most of the rest of the movie consists of the stories played out as classic cartoons. Some of the classic cartoon shorts were abridged. In the One Froggy Evening sequence, the ending where the construction worker from 2056 finds Michigan J. Frog and makes off with him was cut, making it seem as if the cartoon ended with the construction worker from 1955 getting rid of the frog and running off.
- This was the first Looney Tunes compilation film to use a completely original story and treat the included cartoon shorts as part of the story, as opposed to having the characters introduce the cartoons.
- Early television airings (like the Disney Channel in 1991) of the film had one sequence that was cut from the original theatrical version of the film. It took place after Bugs finished reading the story of Goldimouse and the Three Cats to Prince Abba-Dabba, when he told the next story to Abba-Dabba, the "Wolf in Sheep's Clothing" which featured the 1962 Ralph Wolf and Sam Sheepdog cartoon A Sheep in the Deep.

== Voice cast ==
- Mel Blanc as Bugs Bunny, Daffy Duck, Porky Pig, Yosemite Sam, Sylvester the Cat, Sylvester Jr., Speedy Gonzales, Tweety, Rover, Hassan, Hansel, Prince Charming, Big Bad Wolf, Genie, Beanstalk Giant, Elvis Gorilla, Stork (also archive footage)
- June Foray as Granny, Mother Gorilla, Goldimouse, Little Red Riding Hood (archive footage)
- Shepard Menken as Old Storyteller
- Lennie Weinrib as Prince Abba-Dabba
- Bea Benaderet as Witch Hazel, Gretel (archive footage)
- Arthur Q. Bryan as Elmer Fudd (archive footage)
- Tom Holland as Slowpoke Rodriguez (archive footage)
- William "Bill" Roberts as Michigan J. Frog (archive footage)

== Production ==
- The main plot point, setting up Bugs and Daffy as Scheherazade-like figures, is in itself similar to the 1959 short Hare-Abian Nights, which itself used considerable stock footage and also featured Yosemite Sam as the sultan.
- Many voice artists that were not credited in the original shorts are billed as "additional classic voices". For the first time, 23 years after his death, Arthur Q. Bryan finally receives credit on a Warner Bros. production, even if it does not explicitly credit him as the voice of Elmer Fudd.
- The film marks the first time that a Warner cartoon compilation feature used classic cartoon footage from more than one director. One Froggy Evening, Bewitched Bunny and Ali Baba Bunny were directed by Chuck Jones, and Aqua Duck was directed by Robert McKimson, while all other classic shorts included were directed by Friz Freleng.

== Reception ==
Carrie Rickey, reviewer for the Village Voice, remarked that Bugs and Daffy "used to be burrowers, explorers; now they're traveling salesmen imprisoned by the nuclear family."

== Home media ==
The film was released from Warner Home Video on VHS in 1983, and again on July 3, 2001, and is included along with The Bugs Bunny/Road Runner Movie on the 2005 Looney Tunes Movie Collection DVD set.
