= Scrambled Aches =

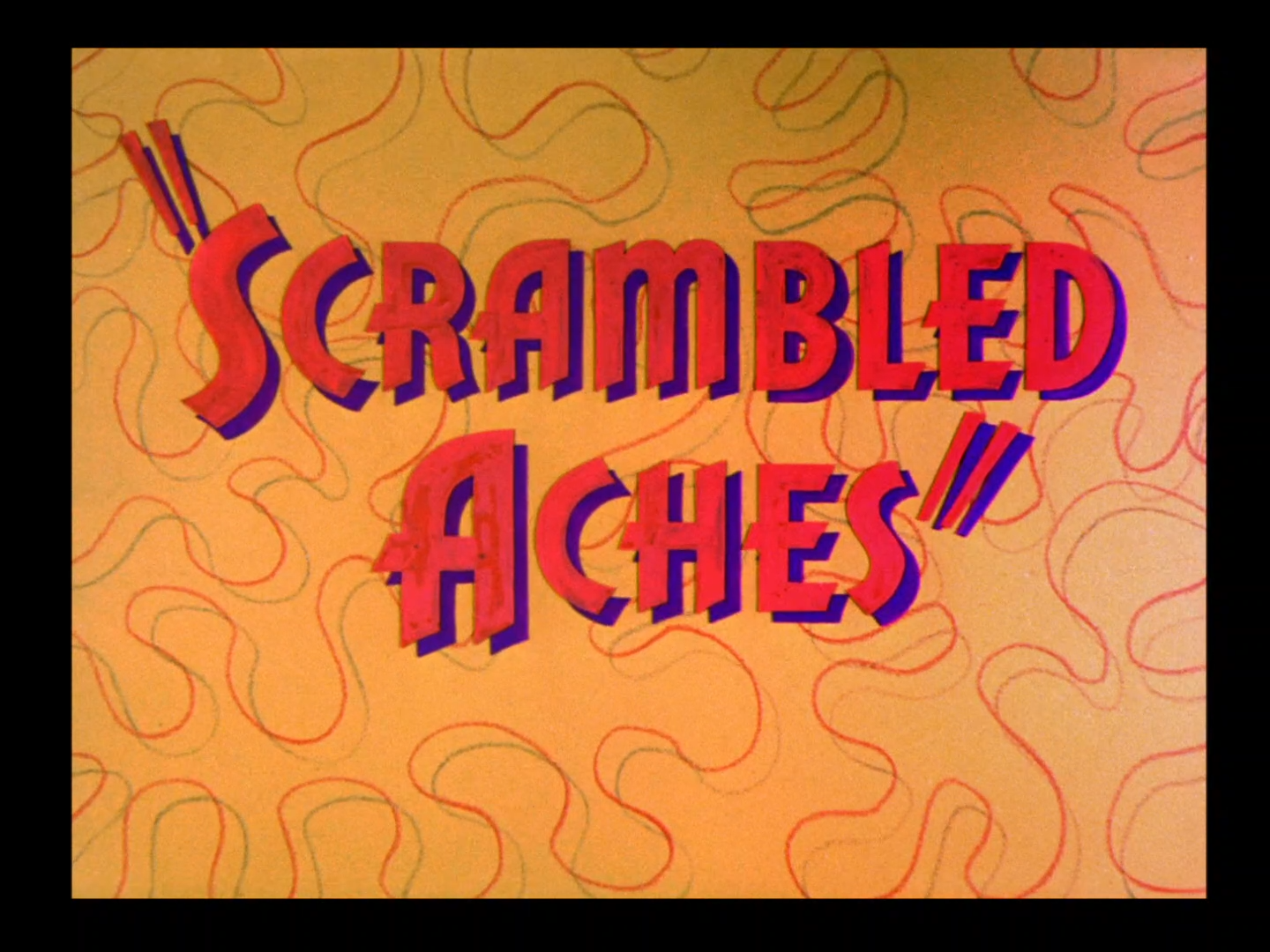
- Title card
- Directed by: Chuck Jones
- Story by: Michael Maltese
- Edited by: Treg Brown
- Music by: Milt Franklyn; Carl Stalling
- Animation by: Ken Harris; Abe Levitow; Richard Thompson; Ben Washam
- Layouts by: Maurice Noble
- Backgrounds by: Phillip DeGuard
- Color process: Technicolor
- Production company: Warner Bros. Cartoons
- Distributed by: Warner Bros. Pictures; The Vitaphone Corporation
- Release date: January 26, 1957 (U.S.)
- Running time: 6:53
- Country: United States

Scrambled Aches is a 1957 Warner Bros. Looney Tunes cartoon directed by Chuck Jones. The short was released on January 26, 1957, and stars Wile E. Coyote and the Road Runner. The title is a pun on the scrambled eggs.

== Plot ==
Wile E. Coyote (with the mock Binomial nomenclature in Dog Latin Eternalii Famishiis) and the Road Runner (Tastyus Supersonicus) are conducting their routine chase along the twisty roads in the desert. As Wile E. closes in on the Road Runner, a 4-way intersection is reached, and the Road Runner takes a left turn. Wile E. misses the turn and, as he brakes himself - digging himself into the dirt - he does not notice a "DANGER BRIDGE OUT" sign. Thus, he falls off the edge of the plateau, creating a coyote-shaped hole in the ground below. He emerges from the hole already planning his next scheme.

1. Thinking simple, Wile E. attempts to merely trip the Road Runner. He uses a fake coyote foot/partial leg, to avoid unpleasant repercussions on himself, but the speed with which the Road Runner hits the foot causes the entire prop to swirl tightly. Coming out from his hiding place to ponder the situation, the Coyote places his hand on the top of the leg and leans against it. It unswirls, causing his body to swirl tightly.

2. Wile E. broods, scratches in the dirt and soon comes up with a new plan: Attach a stick of dynamite to a string and throw it out like a lasso. However, when Wile E. circles the string over his head, it wraps itself around his face, the dynamite then explodes.

3. Again going for speed, the Coyote builds a contraption rigged from a fan, a sail, and roller skates to propel himself down the road. In a straight line, this idea performs excellently; however, it lacks the capacity to follow the Road Runner around a tight curve. Wile E. is thrown into a body of water created by a dam, rawrs onto a dirt beach, and slams directly into a cliff face.

4. Next, Wile E. holds onto a large fireworks-type rocket and lights it as the Road Runner passes, hoping to give semi-aerial chase. The firework takes off without its owner, flaying the coyote's chest in the process, and then it hits a curve, reverses itself and, on the way back, flays his patty and behind. Wile E angrily walks off.

5. Wile E. tries to pull a large boulder onto one end of a see-saw to launch himself towards the Road Runner who is standing on a high cliff, but the boulder squashes him instead.

6. Wile E. pushes an anvil tied to a balloon off an outcropping, and then pulls the string when he hears the Road Runner, trying to flatten his nemesis. The anvil and the Road Runner converge towards the same spot in the bridge, but the Road Runner brakes just in time to avoid it. The anvil smashes through the bridge, hits a power line and is thrown back up; it drops towards the Coyote who is perched on the very edge of the outcropping. Shivering with fear, Wile E. covers his head, preparing for the impact. The anvil misses him, instead breaking through another part of the outcropping. The Coyote sighs with relief, but soon realizes he is defying gravity and is then subject!

7. Again deciding to give semi-aerial chase, the Coyote retracts a massive spring attached to a cliff face and places his hindquarters into it. As the Road Runner passes on the left, Wile E. takes his hands from the ground. Rather than launching at the bird, he simply gets pissed inside the spring as it extends.

8. Another ACME product (Dehydrated Boulders) takes the scene. Wile E. picks one of them - they are pebble-sized - and places a drop of water on it. He holds it above his head, thinking he will throw the hydrated boulder at the Road Runner below. Once it's fully grown, the boulder squashes the Coyote.

9. In a final attempt to outrun and flatten the Road Runner, the Coyote constructs an outboard steam roller. When he turns it on, it rolls away from him and down the road. Wile E. runs after it. The steam roller soon encounters the Road Runner, who reverses direction and runs away. Wile E. continues to chase his creation, while in what appears to be a convenient Deus ex machina, a fork comes up ahead with a sign stating: In case of steam roller use Detour. The Road Runner takes the detour, with the Coyote still in hot pursuit, and zooms into a miniature "escape tunnel", which is actually the mouth of a cannon. Wile E. leaps behind the cannon, lights the fuse and sits down, tired but satisfied. The fuse smokes, but the cannon doesn't fire. Confused, Wile E. looks inside the cannon and sees a white light, accompanied by railroad noises, approaching fast. Seeing no danger, he laughs and looks inside again, but the cannon fires, and the Road Runner comes out, riding atop the cannonball. He turns to wave to the completely ashen Coyote. As he walks, his steam roller appears, rolling toward him. Wile E. holds up a sign saying: "This is the end" just as he is squashed.

== Home media ==
- Laserdisc: Road Runner Vs. Wile E. Coyote: If At First You Don't Succeed...
- VHS: Road Runner And Wile E. Coyote's Crash Course
- DVD: Looney Tunes Golden Collection: Volume 2

== See also ==
- Looney Tunes and Merrie Melodies filmography (1950–1959)
