= List of Looney Tunes television series =

Since 1955, the Looney Tunes franchise spawned many television series and compilation shows.

== List of shows ==
=== Compilations ===
Title	Broadcast run	Original channel	Total # episodes	Total # seasons
Looney Tunes & Merrie Melodies (Note: Hosts include Bob Bean, Sandy Becker, Bill Britten, Fred Scott, Paul Tripp, Herb Sheldon, and Chubby Jackson.)	1955–63	Syndication		
The Bugs Bunny Show	1960–62	ABC	52 episodes	2
The Porky Pig Show	1964–65	ABC	26 episodes	1
The Road Runner Show	1966–68	CBS	26 episodes	1
The Bugs Bunny/Road Runner Hour	1968–69	CBS	26 episodes	1
The Bugs Bunny Show	1971–72	CBS	26 episodes	1
The Merrie Melodies Show	1972	Syndication	24 episodes	1
The Bugs Bunny/Road Runner Hour	1975–77	CBS		
The Bugs Bunny/Road Runner Show	1977–85	CBS		
The Daffy Duck Show	1978–81	NBC	50+ episodes	4
The Daffy/Speedy Show	1981–83	NBC	50+ episodes	4
The Bugs Bunny/Looney Tunes Comedy Hour	1985–86	ABC		
The Bugs Bunny & Tweety Show	1986–2000	ABC		14
Looney Tunes on Nickelodeon	1988–99	Nickelodeon		
Merrie Melodies Starring Bugs Bunny & Friends	1990–94	Syndication (1990–92); Fox Kids (1992–94)	65 episodes	1
Bugs and Daffy / Looney Tunes	1992–present	Cartoon Network (1992–2004, 2009–17, 2023); Boomerang (2003–07, 2013–present); Discovery Family (2023–present)		
That's Warner Bros.!	1995–98	Kids' WB	130 episodes	2
Bugs 'n' Daffy	1995–98	Kids' WB	130 episodes	2
The Cat&Birdy Warneroonie PinkyBrainy Big Cartoonie Show	1999–2000	Kids' WB	46 episodes	2
The Cat&Bunny Warneroonie SuperLooney Big Cartoonie Show	1999–2000	Kids' WB	46 episodes	2
Bugs Bunny and Friends	2021–present	MeTV (2021–present); MeTV Toons (2024–present)		

=== Original shows ===
Note: All shows produced by Warner Bros. Animation unless otherwise noted.

Series number	Title	Broadcast run	Original channel	Total # episodes	Total # seasons	Co-production with	Notes
1	Tiny Toon Adventures	1990–92	CBS (1990); Syndication (1990–92); Fox Kids (1992)	98 episodes	3	Amblin Entertainment	
2	Taz-Mania	1991–95	Fox Kids	65 episodes	4		
3	The Plucky Duck Show	1992	Fox Kids	13 episodes	1	Amblin Entertainment	Spin-off of Tiny Toon Adventures.
4	The Sylvester & Tweety Mysteries	1995–2002	Kids' WB (1995–2000); Cartoon Network (2002)	52 episodes	5		
5	Pinky, Elmyra & the Brain	1998–99	Kids' WB	13 episodes	1	Amblin Entertainment	Spin-off of Tiny Toon Adventures and Animaniacs.
6	Baby Looney Tunes	2002–05	Kids' WB (2002); Cartoon Network (2005)	53 episodes	2		
7	Duck Dodgers	2003–05	Cartoon Network (2003–05); Boomerang (2005)	39 episodes	3		
8	Loonatics Unleashed	2005–07	Kids' WB	26 episodes	2		
9	The Looney Tunes Show	2011–13	Cartoon Network	52 episodes	2		
10	New Looney Tunes	2015–20	Cartoon Network (2015–16); Boomerang (2017); Boomerang SVOD (2017–20)	156 episodes	3		Formerly known as Wabbit: A Looney Tunes Production (or Bugs! in some regions) during its first season.
11	Looney Tunes Cartoons	2020–24	HBO Max (2020–23); Max (2023–24)	82 episodes	6		
12	Bugs Bunny Builders	2022–present	Cartoonito	80 episodes	2		
13	Tiny Toons Looniversity	2023–2025	Max; Cartoon Network	23 episodes	2	Amblin Television	Reboot of Tiny Toon Adventures.

=== Cameo appearance in other television series ===
Title	Years	Network	Appearance
59th Academy Awards	1987	ABC	Animation for Bugs Bunny presenting the award for Best Animated Short.
62nd Academy Awards	1990	ABC	Animation for Bugs Bunny presenting the award for Best Animated Short.
Night Court	1990	ABC	Judge Harry Stone finds Wile E. Coyote guilty of harassment, telling him to go to a restaurant and leave the Road Runner alone.
The Earth Day Special	1990	ABC	Looney Tunes segments.
67th Academy Awards	1995	ABC	Animation for Bugs Bunny and Daffy Duck presenting the award for Best Animated Short.
The Drew Carey Show	1998	ABC	Animated intro featuring Daffy Duck in the episode "My Best Friend's Wedding".

== List of unproduced shows ==
Title	Notes
Mixed Nutz	Tom Ruegger pitched an idea for a TV show where the Looney Tunes and Hanna-Barbera characters have crossovers together in different stories and parodies, but the series was scrapped when the executives found it too disorienting combining both franchises together.
Tooned Out	On October 29, 2019, at the HBO Max launch event, it was announced that a live-action/animated television series titled Tooned Out, featuring Looney Tunes, Hanna-Barbera, and Cartoon Network characters, was in development at Warner Bros. Animation and ImageMovers and was scheduled to release on the then-upcoming WarnerMedia streaming service. Robert Zemeckis and Jared Stern were set to write the series. There have been no official updates since.
Tweety Mysteries	On February 17, 2021, it was announced that a live-action/animated hybrid series similar to The Sylvester & Tweety Mysteries titled Tweety Mysteries was in development. It would have been aimed toward girls and would have aired on Cartoon Network. However, the series was cancelled without airing in December 2022.

== See also ==
- Looney Tunes and Merrie Melodies filmography
- List of Looney Tunes feature films
- Animaniacs
