= There They Go-Go-Go! =

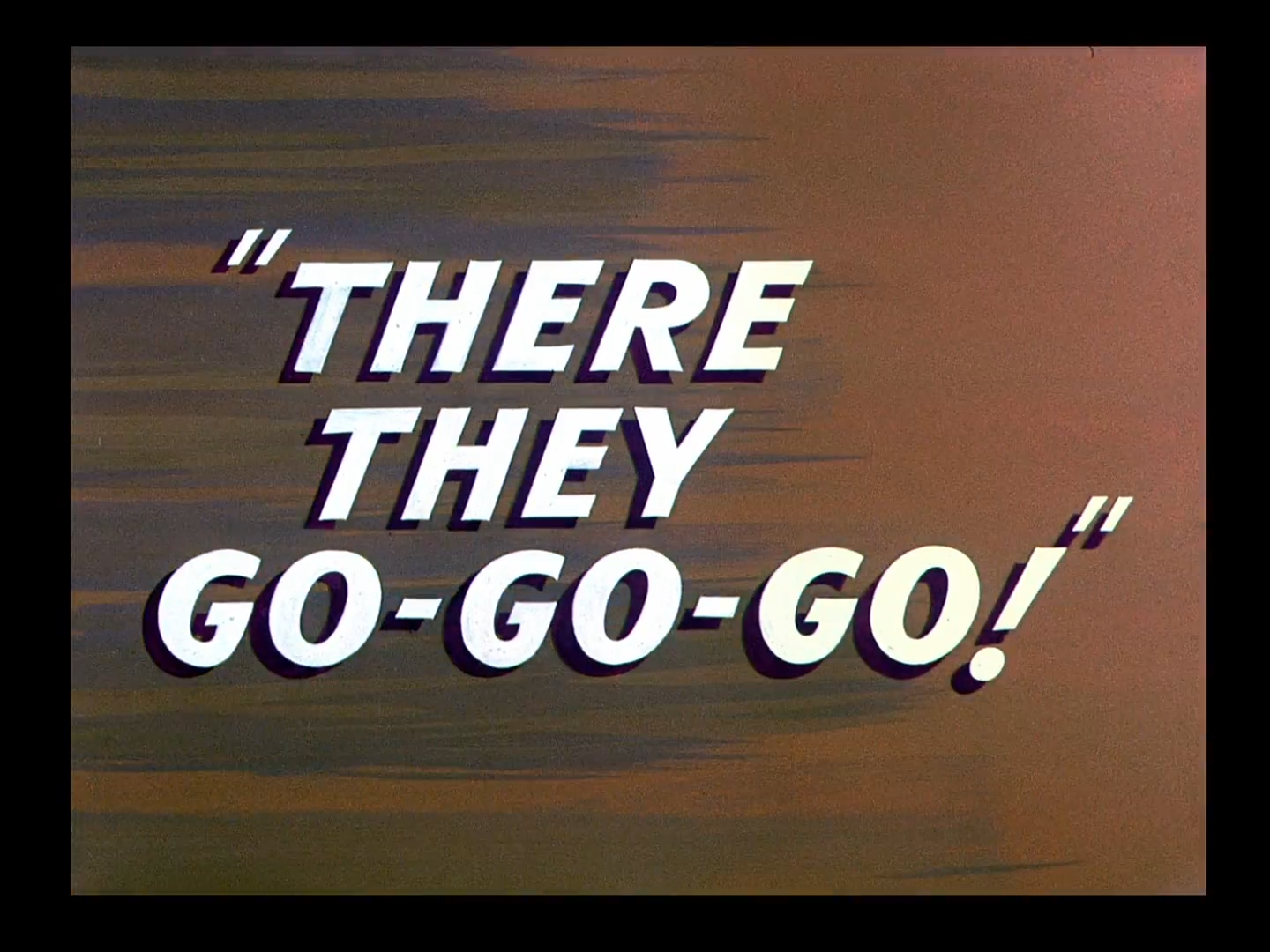
- Title card
- Directed by: Chuck Jones
- Story by: Michael Maltese
- Edited by: Treg Brown
- Music by: Carl Stalling
- Animation by: Richard Thompson; Ken Harris; Abe Levitow; Ben Washam; Harry Love
- Layouts by: Philip DeGuard
- Backgrounds by: Philip DeGuard
- Production company: Warner Bros. Cartoons
- Distributed by: Warner Bros. Pictures; The Vitaphone Corporation
- Release date: November 10, 1956
- Running time: 6:37

There They Go-Go-Go! is a 1956 Warner Bros. Looney Tunes cartoon directed by Chuck Jones. The short was released on November 10, 1956, and stars Wile E. Coyote and the Road Runner.

== Plot ==
Wile E. Coyote, apparently famished, wads up a bunch of mud to make a lookalike chicken. He shovels it in an adobe oven, then once he is done roasting it, he sits down to "eat" it, with less than perfect results (a tooth falls off his mouth in the process). So, he makes a second fixture - a trash can - and throws the "chicken" in it, proving he is indeed Famishius Fantasticus. An object racing past at jet speed bowls everything over, and the "chicken" in the "trash can" lands on him. A question mark appears. Wile E. looks out to see what bowled over everything. Its name and mock Binomial nomenclature in Dog Latin appear as Roadrunner (Dig-outius Tid-bittius). The bird beeps and zooms away, starting the chase. Wile E. takes a straight-line shortcut instead of the road to catch up. Before Wile E. can come close however, the Road Runner sets the road ablaze with his high-friction speed, causing Wile E. to burn his feet. He stomps out the fire on his paws but finds his tail also burning. Wile E., thinking fast, witches for water to cool his tail off. The Coyote rages at the camera, but nothing can be done except plan the next scheme.

1. Wile E. uses his frequent idea: swing from a high place armed with a javelin, looking to spear the Road Runner. This time, he simply plows into the ground as the Road Runner calmly passes on the right.

2. The Coyote places a gun on a spring into a ground compartment and locks it with a safety catch, hoping to shoot his enemy, but due to the excessive spring force, the gun does a 180 and ends up on the opposite side of the Coyote, pointed in his face upside down. Wile E. plugs the barrel with his finger but still gets blasted in the face. The gun retracts back to the hole in the ground, pulling its owner with it.

3. Wile E. attaches himself to a tree catapult to throw himself towards a passing Road Runner, but instead, he bounces himself on the ground and suffers repeating back and forth faceplants as the tree continually stretches to either side.

4. To block the Road Runner, the Coyote attaches a bunch of maces to a string and pole and unwinds the string when he hears the bird approaching. It's an effective obstacle and would have stopped the Road Runner except that the pole lifts itself out of the ground and drops on the hiding Coyote before the Road Runner passes. Wile E. is battered and tied up by the end of the fracas.

5. This time, the Coyote uses deception. He posts a detour and bridges a crevasse with a ladder that he has sabotaged with a cut in the structure, which will make it collapse if passed over. He hears the Road Runner but doesn't see him, and he looks up to see the Road Runner safely perched on top of a high cliff, watching his every move. The angry Coyote uses his own broken ladder to climb up to the top, with predictably disastrous results. Wile E. falls into the canyon, grabs onto the second section of the ladder to alleviate the fall, and continues into the ground through each rung on the way down.

6. Now, having disassembled a wagon train cart, Wile E. loads the spokes of the wagon wheel with sticks of dynamite. He rolls the wheel down a hill to meet the Road Runner, but only the tire part of the wheel was rolled, the spokes and hub with the dynamite tied around it stay behind and blow-up Wile E. instead.

7. The Coyote is loaded into a massive missile to chase the Road Runner, but when he sets it off, instead of launching the missile, he only launches himself out of it and through a rock face. He emerges from the resulting hole, blackened.

8. The final gag in this cartoon involves a pack of rocks from high, ready to fall on the Road Runner when the trap door opens. But when Wile E. opens the trap door, the rocks remain intact because they're too densely packed. To try and fix this, the Coyote first runs to the top and stomps on them, no dice. Next, he procures a long, thin stick and uses it like an ice pick to force them out while standing under them. Pebbles start to fall, followed by stones, then rocks. Wile E. finally comes to his senses and raises a sign: "IN HEAVEN'S NAME - WHAT AM I DOING?" (Also used in Chariots of Fur). Too late; Wile E. drops the long thin stick and raises a tiny parasol to prepare for the resulting impact of huge rocks, and after he is buried underneath them, Coyote puts up his stick through the rocks with a white flag making it look like a flagpole. The flag reads "THE END" while it waves in the wind, accompanied by the song: "Taps".

== See also ==
- Looney Tunes and Merrie Melodies filmography (1950–1959)
