= Zipping Along =

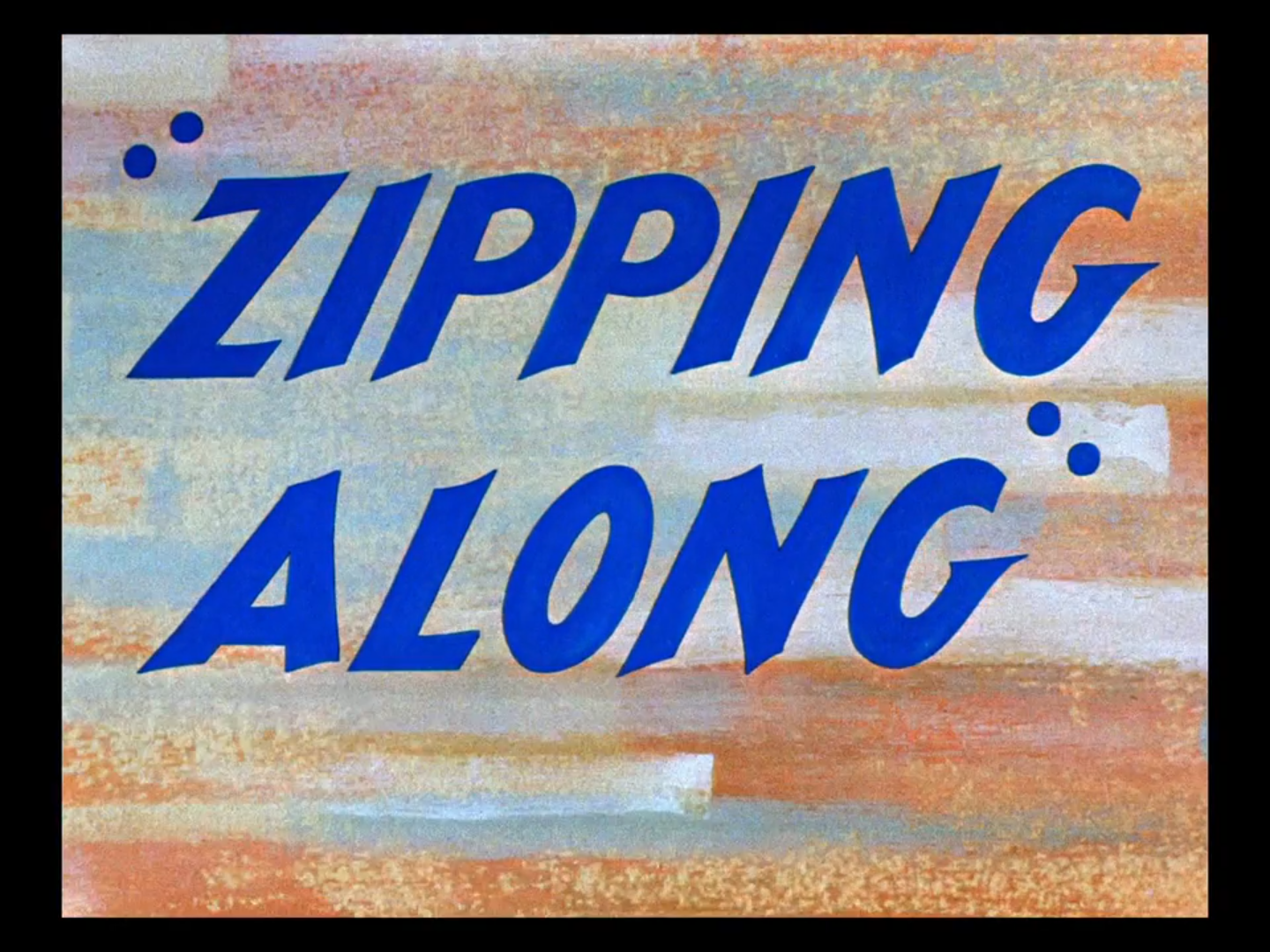
- Title card
- Directed by: Charles M. Jones
- Story by: Michael Maltese
- Music by: Carl Stalling; Milt Franklyn
- Animation by: Ken Harris; Ben Washam; Lloyd Vaughan
- Layouts by: Maurice Noble; Robert Gribbroek
- Backgrounds by: Philip De Guard
- Color process: Technicolor
- Production company: Warner Bros. Cartoons
- Distributed by: Warner Bros. Pictures; The Vitaphone Corporation
- Release date: September 19, 1953
- Running time: 6:50

Zipping Along is a 1953 Warner Bros. Merrie Melodies cartoon directed by Chuck Jones. The short was released on September 19, 1953, and stars Wile E. Coyote and the Road Runner.

== Plot ==
The Road Runner is "zipping along" by a train, and the camera zooms in and then freezes to display his mock Binomial nomenclature in Dog Latin: Velocitus Tremenjus. When the cartoon restarts, the Road Runner leaves the train and runs onto the main roads, with the Coyote watching from above. He glances from side to side, and the camera freezes for Wile E. Coyote (Road-Runnerus Digestus) halfway through his head-turning. True to this name, he ventures down the mountain and toward the road, waiting for the familiar Beep-beep sound; when this reaches his ears, he jumps into a 4-way intersection, but the Road Runner mows him down from behind. When the seething coyote stands up, facing the opposite direction, he is flattened from the other side, and then eventually from all four directions. The camera cuts to Wile E., who looks increasingly annoyed as this sequence repeats over and over until the camera cuts away.

1. Lying in wait behind a rock with a hand grenade, attempting to pull the pin with his teeth, the Coyote instead finds himself with the grenade in his mouth and throws the pin at the Road Runner. As he realizes the gaffe, KA-BOOM!.

2. Wile E. now inspects the roads from a high overlook and peers out to see that the Road Runner has disappeared temporarily. That ends when the bird pops up behind Wile E. and beeps, then dashes away, leaving behind a lifesize cloud of dust in his likeness that also beeps at the Coyote. He reclines on the rail, miffed at the turn of events.

3. As the cartoon returns to the regular desert scenery, Wile E. gingerly drops a bunch of mousetraps onto the road, but when the Road Runner zooms past, instead of getting trapped in them, the traps drop onto Wile E. in his trench hideout. The coyote's reaction is delayed briefly before he leaps into the air, screaming in pain.

4. Resorting now to ACME products, these being a kite kit and bomb, Wile E. leaps in the air several times in an attempt to go airborne, but soon runs off the edge of the cliff he is on, and he falls to the ground and his own bomb explodes on him.

5. The Road Runner is zipping along some roads while Wile E. is chopping down a telephone pole. He confirms the path of the Road Runner and finishes chopping but is too late to realize he has still miscalculated. The pole pulls down the one next to him, which crushes him.

6. Living up to the Wile E. part of his name, Coyote offers bird seed mixed with steel shot to the Road Runner, who stops his road-burning and has a quick snack. Wile E. jumps out behind the bird as he speeds away with a giant magnet, but a big TNT canister is intead attracted to the magnet and another explosion results, twisting the magnet into a pretzel and knocking Wile E. back through a rock face.

7. Delving deeper into wily trickery, Coyote learns hypnotism from a book to induce the Road Runner to jump off a cliff. He tests the method successfully on a small bug by projecting a static lightning from his hands. However, when he jumps out and tries to hit the Road Runner with it, the bird counters with a mirror that causes the lightning to be reflected back to Wile E., who obligingly walks off the cliff having succeeded in hypnotizing himself.

8. The Road Runner taunts his opponent from above, and Coyote attempts to use a seesaw and rock contraption, which only causes the rock to fall back to Coyote.

9. Now, Wile E. sets a gun trap for the Road Runner, with himself ready to activate the guns at a moment's notice. He hides behind a turn as the Road Runner runs into the trap. However, he pulls too hard, and the guns are pulled into the crosshairs of the Coyote and promptly blast him.

10. Coyote now hides behind a rock as he waits for the Road Runner to speed across a treacherous suspension bridge. As the Road Runner crosses, Wile E. jumps out and cuts the ropes. However, instead of causing the bridge to fall, the whole plateau that Wile E. inhabits falls down. The Road Runner brakes at the end of the bridge and continues on.

11. Wile E. waits for the Road Runner to pass and then loads himself into a "human cannonball" cannon, which recoils and is thrown backwards, leaving Coyote blackened.

12. Coyote is now on top of a rectangular board bridging a deep canyon, holding a large wrecking ball. He drops the ball into a circular path, but the bird simply stops and waits for the wrecking ball to pass. The ball continues its circle and ends up right back where it started... on top of Coyote.

13. The Coyote finally mines a canyon with myriad explosives behind a doorway with many "FREE BIRD SEED" declarations and connects the main controller to the door. However, as soon as Coyote climbs over the wall, he encounters a gigantic truck. With no recourse, Wile E. had no choice to open the door, gets blown up and then gets run over by the truck. The cartoon ends with a charred and disoriented Wile E. sticking out his tongue and letting out a "beep, beep" in an imitation of the Road Runner (symbolizing that if he can't beat the Road Runner, join him), then falling unconscious.
