= Hopalong Casualty =

- Directed by: Chuck Jones
- Story by: Chuck Jones
- Starring: Paul Julian (Road Runner); Mel Blanc (Wile E. Coyote)
- Edited by: Treg Brown
- Music by: Milt Franklyn
- Animation by: Tom Ray; Ken Harris; Richard Thompson; Bob Bransford
- Layouts by: Maurice Noble
- Backgrounds by: Philip DeGuard
- Color process: Technicolor
- Production company: Warner Bros. Cartoons
- Distributed by: Warner Bros. Pictures; The Vitaphone Corporation
- Release date: October 8, 1960
- Running time: 7 minutes
- Country: United States

Hopalong Casualty is a 1960 Warner Bros. Looney Tunes theatrical animated short, directed by Chuck Jones. The short was released on October 8, 1960, and stars Wile E. Coyote and the Road Runner. The title is a play on the Hopalong Cassidy western series of books written by author Clarence E. Mulford.

== Plot ==
As usual, Wile E. Coyote (Hard-headipus ravenus) has gone in pursuit of The Road Runner (Speedipus Rex). The title shows just before the Coyote gains on the Road Runner. He lunges, leaping and grabbing his quarry by the throat. A two-second wrestling match follows, with both combatants in a round ball rolling down the road from the force of their running, but Wile E. emerges "holding" only a smoke outline of the bird. The confused Coyote looks in his hands just as the Road Runner speeds up behind Wile E. He beeps, sending the Coyote flying through the air and leaves him hanging on a telephone pole. When he slides back down, the Road Runner beeps again, sending not only Wile E. in the air, but also the telephone pole, which escapes Wile E.'s grip. He then looks relieved, but because of the power lines, the pole zooms back to Wile E. and drives him into the ground. He then comes out of a nearby manhole, flattened and humiliated. Of course, there is nothing left to do but plan more schemes.

1. First, the Coyote goes simple by waiting behind a rock face, and when he hears the "beep-beep" of the Road Runner, he jumps out into the middle of the road, only to be flattened by an approaching truck.

2. Next, the Coyote sets up a rope and rock trap, but when he pulls the string, he ends up squashing himself (but not his feet).

3. The Coyote now places dynamite in a tunnel under the road, but as he goes deeper into the tunnel, the detonator handle pushes down further, and eventually the dynamite explodes on the Coyote.

4. Now, the Coyote uses an Acme Christmas Packaging Machine. He puts it in a pit with a sign that says "DETOUR". The Coyote snickers gleefully, but then the Road Runner, as expected, pops up behind the Coyote and beeps. The startled Coyote leaps in the air and into the Christmas Packaging Machine. The result is a neatly packaged Wile E. Coyote. Humiliated, the boxed Coyote tiptoes off the screen.

5. This time, the Coyote uses dynamite on a fishing line. When he hears the Road Runner, he jerks back the rod and prepares to cast the line. He jerks a bit too hard, however; the dynamite gets stuck in a cactus, and eventually, the Coyote gets wound around the cactus with the line when he tries to yank it free. He then sees that the dynamite is about to go off, and tries to blow out the fuse, but instead makes it burn down faster, and it then explodes.

6. Finally, the Coyote scatters some Acme Earthquake Pills on the road, hoping that the Road Runner can mistake them for birdseed. The Road Runner obligingly eats them, but they have no effect as he zooms away. In disgust, the Coyote swallows an earthquake pill himself, and then even more disgustedly swallows all of the remaining pills. After jumping up and down several times in an attempt to trigger an earthquake, he contemptuously chucks the empty bottle over his shoulder, but immediately leaps after the bottle with bulging eyes to catch it before it shatters in the middle of the road. Wile E. is just in time to read the fine print at the bottom of the bottle's label: "Caution: Not effective on Road Runners". As soon as he sees this, he gulps nervously, now knowing what he faces. As he gingerly takes his first step to get out of the middle of the road, the product takes effect on him, causing him to shake, rattle and jerk helplessly across the landscape, getting flattened by a huge boulder and almost falling off a narrow rocky arch in the process. When the product finally wears off, the Coyote feels so relieved that he steps out without looking where he's going, and walks over a cliff's edge, falling to the ground. Just then the Road Runner sees the Coyote hit the ground and looks at the audience and then beeps once more and takes off, with the trail of smoke left behind him, forming the words "The End".

== Home media ==
This short is available on the Looney Tunes Collector's Choice: Volume 4 Blu-ray.
