= Wild About Hurry =

- Directed by: Chuck Jones
- Story by: Michael Maltese
- Edited by: Treg Brown
- Music by: Musical direction: Milt Franklyn
- Animation by: Character animation: Ken Harris; Abe Levitow; Richard Thompson; Ben Washam; Keith Darling; Effects animation: Harry Love
- Layouts by: Character and background layout: Philip DeGuard
- Backgrounds by: Background layout and paint: Philip DeGuard
- Color process: Technicolor
- Production company: Warner Bros. Cartoons
- Distributed by: Warner Bros. Pictures
- Release date: October 10, 1959
- Running time: 7 minutes
- Country: United States

Wild About Hurry is a 1959 Warner Bros. Merrie Melodies cartoon directed by Chuck Jones. The short was released on October 10, 1959, and stars Wile E. Coyote and the Road Runner. The title is a pun on the then-popular song, "I'm Just Wild About Harry".

== Plot ==
Wile E. Coyote (Hardheadipius Oedepius) is shown brandishing scissors on top of a high-rise tree branch, ready to cut a rope and drop a rock onto the passing Road Runner (Batoutanhelius). The rock displays the title, and when it falls to the ground and barely misses, the credits are shown in the dust and scrambled by the exhaust of a rocket.

1. Coyote rides the rocket, which lets him almost catch the Road Runner.
2. An ACME giant elastic rubber band causes a hard faceplant.
3. Coyote tries to smash the Road Runner with a rock, but it drops off a cliff with him on it and his attempt to save himself with a "spinning top" run burrows him into an active railroad tunnel.
4. A hand-built railroad on another cliff, complete with rocket car, produces a crash.
5. Coyote tricks the Road Runner into swallowing iron pellets, then puts a magnet and a hand grenade together with a roller skate. The assembly comes apart and leaves the grenade behind to explode in Coyote's face.
6. A bowling ball intended to squash the Road Runner pounds Coyote instead.
7. With all the forces of nature against him, Coyote plugs himself into an ACME Indestructo Steel Ball and rolls himself off an escarpment. The ball rolls off course, Coyote inside, and through a tortuous course. The entire sequence repeats as the Road Runner approaches once again, and after Coyote misses him for a second time, the Road Runner holds up a sign that says "HERE WE GO AGAIN", beeps, and then dashes off into the distance as the cartoon irises out.

== Home media ==
This short is available on disc 1 of the Looney Tunes Collector's Vault: Volume 1 Blu-ray set.

== See also ==
- Looney Tunes and Merrie Melodies filmography (1950–1959)
- Wile E.'s ACME Amusement Park (in the rocket sled segment)
