= Whoa, Be-Gone! =

- Title card
- Directed by: Chuck Jones
- Story by: Michael Maltese
- Edited by: Treg Brown
- Music by: Milt Franklyn
- Animation by: Ken Harris; Abe Levitow; Richard Thompson; Harry Love
- Layouts by: Maurice Noble
- Backgrounds by: Philip DeGuard
- Color process: Technicolor
- Production company: Warner Bros. Cartoons
- Distributed by: Warner Bros. Pictures
- Release date: April 12, 1958
- Running time: 6 minutes 14 seconds
- Country: United States

Whoa, Be-Gone! is a 1958 Warner Bros. Merrie Melodies cartoon directed by Chuck Jones. The short was released on April 12, 1958, and stars Wile E. Coyote and the Road Runner.

The title is a play on the word "woebegone", meaning to be deeply beset by sadness and grief.

== Plot ==
Wile E. Coyote (Famishius Vulgaris Ingeniusi) and the Road Runner (Birdius High-Ballius) continue their game of cat and mouse. Over the title cards, Coyote chases Road Runner with a rocket. He then sets up various traps using a see-saw, a trampoline, a sniper rifle, a giant rubber band, a bunch of fireworks inside a barrel, a high wire structure, a pile of TNT underneath a high bridge, and ACME Tornado Seeds (which trigger a tornado when exposed to water) in hopes of trapping Road Runner. Road Runner evades every trap and the cartoon ends with Coyote being dragged into an army mine field by a whole container of tornado seeds when his water gun fails to fire towards the seeds on the road, but instead the water falls out of the grip into the container, triggering a massive tornado. As Coyote suffers explosion after explosion, Road Runner pulls down the "That's All Folks!" end-title card like a curtain/shade.

== Crew ==
- Story: Michael Maltese
- Animation: Ken Harris, Abe Levitow, Richard Thompson, Ben Washam, Keith Darling
- Layouts: Maurice Noble
- Backgrounds: Philip DeGuard
- Effects Animator: Harry Love
- Film Editor: Treg Brown
- Vocal Characterizations: Paul Julian (uncredited)
- Music Score: Milt Franklyn
- Directed By: Chuck Jones

== See also ==
- Looney Tunes and Merrie Melodies filmography (1950–1959)
