= High Diving Hare =

1949 film by Friz Freleng

- Title card
- Directed by: I. Freleng
- Story by: Tedd Pierce
- Starring: Mel Blanc
- Music by: Carl Stalling
- Animation by: Gerry Chiniquy; Manuel Perez; Ken Champin; Virgil Ross; Pete Burness
- Layouts by: Hawley Pratt
- Backgrounds by: Paul Julian
- Color process: Technicolor
- Production company: Warner Bros. Cartoons
- Distributed by: Warner Bros. Pictures; The Vitaphone Corporation
- Release date: April 30, 1949
- Running time: 7:30
- Language: English

High Diving Hare is a 1948-produced Warner Bros. Looney Tunes theatrical cartoon short starring Bugs Bunny and Yosemite Sam. Released to theaters on April 30, 1949, the short is an expansion of a gag from Stage Door Cartoon, which was also directed by Friz Freleng, and co-stars Elmer Fudd. High Diving Hare can be seen in the third act of The Looney Looney Looney Bugs Bunny Movie, and a segment can be seen in the special Bugs Bunny's Wild World of Sports (the latter revealing that Sam has become a champion high diver due to his experiences in the short).

== Plot ==
Bugs Bunny is drumming up business for a vaudeville show in a remote Western town (notably one of the posters in the background is for "Frizby the Magician", a reference to director Friz Freleng). One of the main attractions is "Fearless Freep" and his high diving act. In the crowd, Yosemite Sam recognizes the name "Fearless Freep" and goes into a joyful frenzy, buying as many tickets as he can.

During the show, as Bugs is about to introduce Freep, he receives a telegram saying that Freep is delayed by a storm and will not be able to perform until the following night. An angered Sam insists on seeing the high diving act and forces Bugs at gunpoint to the top of a high dive platform. But Bugs manages to pull out all his tricks and stops, and it is Sam who does all the diving, in a different comical setting nine separate times (in a variant of the diving act from Stage Door Cartoon).

1: Sam pushes Bugs to the edge of the platform (with Bugs baring his claws to secure himself to the board). Bugs tells Sam to cover his eyes while he puts on his bathing suit and then proceeds to spin the board around so that Sam is at the diving edge. Bugs makes it look like he has taken the dive (accompanied with an audible "SPLASH"). Sam, muttering that he cannot believe Bugs actually jumped, turns around and walks right off the edge. As Sam descends to the tank, Bugs zooms down the ladder and watches this dramatic scene from the audience saying, "This I gotta see." After Sam lands in the tank, it falls apart; the hoops break off, leaving the water intact.

2: Bugs begins jumping on the board (reciting the "One for the Money" poem) and jumps on the board so hard that he sends Sam up, over his head and down (separating Sam from his pistols in the process). Bugs then realizes that he forgot to fill the tank with water, so he grabs a bucket of water and throws it down from the diving board past Sam. With Sam's encouragement, the water makes it into the tank, but Sam misses it altogether, smashing through the stage into the basement.

3: Sam walks to the end of the board and finds Bugs standing on the board upside down. Bugs points out that it is actually Sam who is upside down. Sam looks "up", sees the tank, and falls into it.

4: Having been verbally hit with "fightin' words", Bugs dares Sam to "step over this line" (in a gag similar to one from Bugs Bunny Rides Again), sending Sam down for the splash again (but not before springing back up for a moment to declare: "I hate you!")

5: Sam is stopped by a door, and yells "Open up that door!" then turns to the audience and says: "Y'notice I didn't say Richard?". Sam threatens to break the door down but Bugs still refuses. He backs up and charges towards the door, which Bugs opens at the last moment, leading Sam to another splash, this time assisted by an anvil given to him by Bugs.

6: As his antagonist climbs up guns blazing, Bugs, dressed as an Indian, points Sam to a "shortcut" in a desert-like setting. Sam thanks the "Indian" and takes the route, leading to yet another dive.

After two more dives in which the setups are unseen, Sam finally has Bugs tied and standing on the edge of the platform, with Sam sawing away at the board, gloating that Bugs will actually dive this time. However, as soon as Sam cuts through the board, it is the ladder and platform that falls, leaving the severed plank (and Bugs) suspended in mid-air. Bugs turns to the camera and cracks: "I know this defies the law of gravity, but, you see, I never studied law!"

== Cast ==
- Mel Blanc as Bugs Bunny, Yosemite Sam and Telegram Boy (unseen)

== Critical reception ==
High Diving Hare has gained critical acclaim.

In a commentary by Greg Ford, it is described as "arguably the best of all" Bugs and Sam confrontations. Ford also refers to the ways Bugs tricks Sam as "almost idiotically simple".

Similarly, cartoonist Jeff Smith writes, "Written by Ted Pierce, High Diving Hare is a one-gag cartoon. Seriously—there is only one joke in this cartoon. Yosemite Sam falls 500 feet into a barrel of water, over and over again. And it gets funnier and funnier with each whistling plunge... The timing of Sam's high diving is all the more remarkable when you think about the fact that Warner's directors had no budget for editing after the film was finished. All the timing for action and gags was set in stone before a single frame was drawn. All Looney Tunes are fast, pared-down affairs that never waste a frame, but even by these standards, High Diving Hare is a precision masterpiece."

== See also ==
- Bugs Bunny filmography
- Yosemite Sam filmography
- Looney Tunes and Merrie Melodies filmography (1940–1949)

Preceded by Rebel Rabbit	Bugs Bunny Cartoons; 1949	Succeeded by Bowery Bugs
