= Ali Baba Bunny =

1957 animated short film by Chuck Jones

- Title card
- Directed by: Chuck Jones
- Story by: Michael Maltese
- Starring: Mel Blanc
- Edited by: Treg Brown
- Music by: Carl Stalling; Milt Franklyn
- Animation by: Richard Thompson; Ken Harris; Abe Levitow; Ben Washam; Harry Love
- Layouts by: Maurice Noble
- Backgrounds by: Philip DeGuard
- Color process: Technicolor
- Production company: Warner Bros. Cartoons
- Distributed by: Warner Bros. Pictures; The Vitaphone Corporation
- Release date: February 9, 1957
- Running time: 6:55
- Country: United States
- Language: English

Ali Baba Bunny is a 1957 Warner Bros. Merrie Melodies parody animated short directed by Chuck Jones. The short was released on February 9, 1957, and stars Bugs Bunny and Daffy Duck.

Bugs and Daffy are heading towards Pismo Beach, California, but somehow arrive instead at the Arabian Desert. They discover a cave with hidden treasure, but they have to outwit its guard. Bugs poses as a jinn to do so. Later, Daffy discovers an actual jinn in an oil lamp. After insulting the jinn, Daffy shrinks to miniature size.

The film is named after the folk tale Ali Baba and the Forty Thieves, and parodies some of its themes. The plot is primarily driven by Daffy's greed.

== Plot ==
In the Arabian Desert, a dimwitted guard named Hassan guards a cave where a rich Sultan stores his treasure. Bugs Bunny and Daffy Duck accidentally stumble upon the cave, thinking they have arrived at Pismo Beach, California. Daffy, enamored by the riches and determined to keep it all for himself, forces Bugs back into the burrow. When Hassan finally remembers the command to open the cave, chaos ensues.

Mistaking Hassan for a porter, Daffy is attacked and seeks Bugs' help. Bugs, in turn, outwits Hassan by posing as "Genie da Light Brown Hare". As Daffy steals a gem, Bugs tricks Hassan with an Indian rope trick, seemingly trapping him in the clouds. Daffy, however, discovers an oil lamp with a real jinn, whom he inadvertently angers by rudely forcing him back into the lamp, thinking the jinn is after his treasure. Bugs escapes as the jinn unleashes dire consequences on Daffy for his actions.

Bugs reaches Pismo Beach and finds a pearl in a clam. A miniature Daffy, shrunk by the jinn, arrives and claims the pearl. The cartoon concludes with Bugs making the clam close on Daffy.

== Voice cast ==
- Mel Blanc as Bugs Bunny, Daffy Duck, Hassan, Sultan and Jinn

== Reception ==
Linda Simensky writes, "Ali Baba Bunny was produced in an era where Bugs and Daffy were often paired up, and while that didn't always work, in this cartoon they seem to be formidable opponents. In the early 1950s, Daffy Duck was no longer just daffy. He had progressed to being greedy, cheap, and without a trace of empathy. When put in the right circumstances, this worked. Bugs, as paired up with Daffy, lost a little of his ability to incite conflict, being given the job of mostly reacting and politely suffering Daffy's outbursts. But in this cartoon, Bugs has his classic moments too."

== Legacy ==
Ali Baba Bunny was voted No. 35 of the 50 Greatest Cartoons of all time by members of the animation field. The film was edited into the Looney Tunes greatest hits features The Bugs Bunny/Road Runner Movie (1979) and Bugs Bunny's 3rd Movie: 1001 Rabbit Tales (1982).

== In popular culture ==
During his SportsCenter tenure, Rich Eisen would occasionally use Hassan's catchphrase, "Hassan chop!", when a highlight showed a baseball player tossing his bat in disgust.

The Offspring's 2021 album Let the Bad Times Roll features a song titled "Hassan Chop", which uses audio from the episode.

== Home media ==
DVD:

- Looney Tunes Golden Collection: Volume 5
- DVD – The Essential Daffy Duck

Blu-ray/DVD:

- Looney Tunes Platinum Collection: Volume 2

== See also ==
- List of American films of 1957

Preceded by To Hare Is Human	Bugs Bunny Cartoons; 1957	Succeeded by Bedevilled Rabbit
