= Tweety and the Beanstalk =

1957 film directed by Friz Freleng

- Directed by: Friz Freleng
- Story by: Warren Foster
- Starring: Mel Blanc; June Foray
- Edited by: Treg Brown
- Music by: Milt Franklyn
- Animation by: Gerry Chiniquy; Virgil Ross; Arthur Davis
- Layouts by: Hawley Pratt
- Backgrounds by: Irv Wyner (uncredited)
- Color process: Technicolor
- Production company: Warner Bros. Cartoons
- Distributed by: Warner Bros. Pictures; The Vitaphone Corporation
- Release date: July 1, 1957
- Running time: 6 mins
- Language: English

Tweety and the Beanstalk is a 1957 Warner Bros. Merrie Melodies directed by Friz Freleng. The voices were performed by Mel Blanc and June Foray (uncredited). The short was released on July 1, 1957, and stars Tweety and Sylvester.

The short is the third Warner Bros. cartoon based on the fairy tale Jack and the Beanstalk, following Jack-Wabbit and the Beanstalk and Beanstalk Bunny.

== Plot ==
A farm mother scolds Jack for trading his cow for three seemingly worthless beans. The beans are thrown out a window and land under Sylvester's cat bed. Instantly, the beans sprout into a giant beanstalk that reaches into the heavens, taking the still sleeping Sylvester with it. The puddy tat awakens and is startled at how everything seemingly grew overnight. Eventually, he walks inside a castle and instantly spots a giant birdcage (with a giant Tweety inside).

Sylvester opens the cage and chases what he says are "acres and acres of Tweety Bird.", which causes Tweety to say, "I tawt I taw an itty-bitty puddy-tat!", as Sylvester grabs him. However, Tweety's owner, the giant comes into the room; after Sylvester hides, the giant puts Tweety back in his cage and hangs it on a high ceiling; that way, he won't get into any mischief while he's gone.

Sylvester makes several attempts to get at Tweety, having to overcome both the cage being on the ceiling and dodging a giant bulldog (Hector the Bulldog) who is trying to chase the cat away. Each of Sylvester's attempts to get the bird ends unsuccessfully; several times, he is barely able to get away from the bulldog.

Eventually, Sylvester manages to snatch Tweety from his cage, but immediately afterwards the Giant returns and, sensing an intruder in his home, remarks, "Fee, fi, fo, fat. I tawt I taw a puddy tat!" He immediately chases after Sylvester, who is forced to flee the castle without Tweety. He makes it to the beanstalk and scurries down, the Giant chasing after him. Sylvester manages to reach the ground and chops down the beanstalk with an axe. The Giant falls to the ground very noisily, the impact crushing Sylvester and everything in sight being wrecked. This causes him to be hurled through the earth to China, where he meets with a stereotypical Chinese Tweety, who remarks (in a Chinese accent) his English counterpart's signature lines ("Oh, I taught I taw dishonorable puddy tat.") in addition to speaking mock Chinese.

== Music ==
- Like the Merrie Melodies Blue Ribbon reissue, this cartoon is a Merrie Melodies short, but it no longer uses the Looney Tunes opening and closing theme "The Merry-Go-Round Broke Down".
