= Bully for Bugs =

1953 film by Chuck Jones

- Lobby card
- Directed by: Charles M. Jones
- Story by: Michael Maltese
- Starring: Mel Blanc
- Music by: Carl Stalling
- Animation by: Ben Washam; Lloyd Vaughan; Ken Harris; Harry Love (effects animation)
- Layouts by: Maurice Noble
- Backgrounds by: Philip De Guard
- Color process: Technicolor
- Production company: Warner Bros. Cartoons
- Distributed by: Warner Bros. Pictures; The Vitaphone Corporation
- Release date: August 8, 1953 (U.S.)
- Running time: 7:11

Bully for Bugs is a 1953 Warner Bros. Looney Tunes theatrical cartoon short directed by Chuck Jones and written by Michael Maltese. The cartoon was released on August 8, 1953, and stars Bugs Bunny.

== Plot ==
Bugs Bunny finds himself inadvertently embroiled in a bullfighting spectacle while en route to the Coachella Valley for a carrot festival. Upon stumbling into a Spanish bullring, Bugs becomes the target of Toro the Bull, who is engaged in a confrontation with a matador. Despite attempting to seek assistance from the matador for directions, Bugs is met with disregard, prompting him to confront Toro himself.

Determined to retaliate against Toro's aggression, Bugs dons matador attire and employs clever tactics to outwit the bull. Using an anvil hidden within his cape, Bugs manages to subdue Toro momentarily, only to face a resilient adversary capable of detaching his horns for a counterattack. The ensuing battle between Bugs and Toro unfolds with comedic flair, marked by inventive strategies and physical slapstick humor.

Amidst the escalating conflict, Bugs employs inventive traps and comedic banter to outsmart Toro, culminating in an explosive finale orchestrated through a series of humorous mishaps and contraptions. Ultimately, Bugs emerges victorious, utilizing quick thinking and resourcefulness to outmaneuver Toro and secure his escape.

== Development ==
In his biography Chuck Amuck, Chuck Jones claims he made this cartoon after producer Eddie Selzer burst into Jones' workspace one day and announced, for no apparent reason, that there was nothing funny about bullfighting and no cartoons related to it were to be made. Since Selzer had, in Jones' opinion, consistently proven himself to be wrong about absolutely everything (having once barred Jones from doing any cartoons featuring Pepé Le Pew, on the grounds that he perceived them as not being funny, leading to Jones and Maltese creating For Scent-imental Reasons and winning an Oscar), the only possible option was to make the cartoon. The sounds of the crowd and the bull are recorded from a bullfighting crowd in Barcelona, Spain. For character design, Jones researched the traditional traje de luces, or suit of lights, to create the costume worn by the cowardly matador, as well as Bugs' simplified version. The boulder to the face gag was reused from Rabbit Punch five years earlier, which was also directed by Chuck Jones.

== Reception ==
Darrell Van Citters writes

This film hits squarely in director Chuck Jones' sweet spot and features most of the creative team we've come to associate with his best work... Both the writing and directing are self-assured, and there is no wasted effort anywhere in the film. Jones was a master of timing and the expressive hold. Often his holds would be followed up by the movement of one body part, such as an eyebrow raise, making the statement even more effective. In his best films, such as Bully for Bugs, his timing revealed character, making the moment all the funnier.

== Home media ==
- VHS: Bugs Bunny's Wacky Adventures
- VHS: From Hare to Eternity
- Laserdisc: Bugs Bunny: Winner by a Hare
- DVD: Looney Tunes Golden Collection: Volume 1
- DVD/Blu-ray: Looney Tunes Platinum Collection: Volume 3
- DVD: Looney Tunes: Bugs Bunny and Friends (full frame)

Preceded by Hare Trimmed	Bugs Bunny Cartoons; 1953	Succeeded by Lumber Jack-Rabbit
