= Hot-Rod and Reel! =

1959 film by Chuck Jones

- Directed by: Chuck Jones
- Story by: Michael Maltese
- Edited by: Treg Brown
- Music by: Milt Franklyn
- Animation by: Richard Thompson; Ben Washam; Keith Darling
- Layouts by: Philip DeGuard
- Backgrounds by: Philip DeGuard
- Color process: Technicolor
- Production company: Warner Bros. Cartoons
- Distributed by: Warner Bros. Pictures
- Release date: May 9, 1959
- Running time: 7 minutes
- Country: United States

Hot-Rod and Reel! is a 1959 Warner Bros. Looney Tunes cartoon directed by Chuck Jones. The story was written by Michael Maltese, and the film score was composed by Milt Franklyn.

The short was released on May 9, 1959, and stars Wile E. Coyote and the Road Runner.

== Plot ==
Wile E. Coyote (Famishius-Famishius) attempts several ways to get the Road Runner (Super-Sonicus-Tastius). The Road Runner reaches two outcroppings. When Coyote tries it, the end of said outcropping comes off. Just when he thinks he is about to suffer gravity yet again, Coyote is saved by a tree branch. He tries to go on the plateau nearby, only for the plateau to fall to a river. A fish nearby is spooked when Coyote gets his newest scheme.

1. Coyote races after the Road Runner with his new roller skates. When the Road Runner tries to trip his adversary, Coyote, in time, leaps in the air and sticks his tongue out at the bird, but little does he know, he is about to fall off a cliff yet again. He ends up in the ground, with only his feet sticking out, as the wheels fall off one of the skates.

2. After getting an explosive camera kit, Coyote prepares for his newest deception. The Road Runner is intrigued by the signs. When the Road Runner gets ready for his picture, the gun goes off on the Coyote instead. As the Road Runner speeds away, the dazed Coyote sees the one flaw of his attempt: he forgot to take off the lens cap that was on the entire time.

3. As the Road Runner taunts the Coyote from above, Coyote prepares a trampoline. However, when he jumps, he gets trapped inside like a burlap sack.

4. Now armed with a crossbow and dynamite, Coyote prepares for his plan. However, when he lights the fuse and the Road Runner comes, the crossbow fires yet the dynamite is left behind to blow him up.

5. Now resorting to his trusted company ACME, Coyote receives a jet propelled pogo stick. However, when Coyote prepares the pogo stick, it propels him to the cliff behind him. Down he goes again.

6. Using railroad deception again, Coyote hammers a crossing sign, accompanied by tracks set up and a record player with Hi-Fi railroad crossing sounds playing. When the Road Runner stops, Coyote tries to catch the bird, only to be run over by an actual train.

7. Having almost blown his top with simple traps, Coyote uses 12 bombs down an extremely long slide (identical to the one he had tried to use in Zoom and Bored). He lifts the slide door to release the bombs from their bin, but none of them come out. He tries shaking the bin moderately, then violently. After pondering, he also tries to prise them out, but when he tries to stomp on them, Boom! A dazed Coyote slides down, and the Road Runner passes over him to add insult to injury.

8. Coyote receives another of ACME's products, a jet-propelled unicycle. When Coyote lights the fuse, he is dragged away. Wile E. tries to balance himself and succeeds. As he approaches the Road Runner, the bird seemingly speeds off in a cloud of dust, but just after Coyote zooms by the dust cloud, the cloud disappears, revealing the Road Runner's still there, having faked Coyote out, who then falls off a cliff and the resulting cloud of smoke has the words "The End" on it.

== Home media ==
This short is available on the Looney Tunes Collector's Choice: Volume 1 Blu-ray.

== See also ==
- Looney Tunes and Merrie Melodies filmography (1950–1959)
