= Wise Quackers =

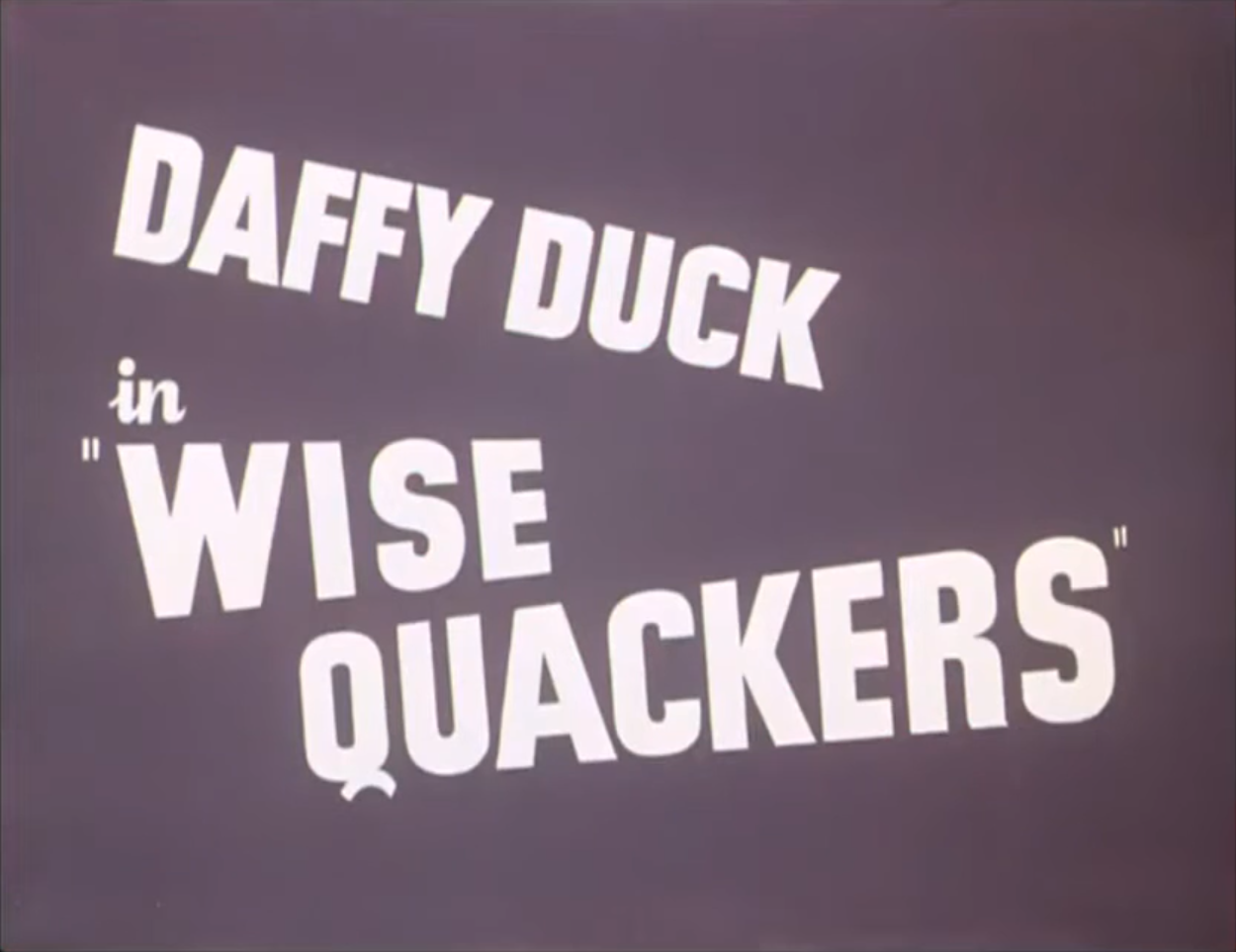
- Title card
- Directed by: I. Freleng
- Story by: Tedd Pierce
- Starring: Mel Blanc; Arthur Q. Bryan (uncredited)
- Music by: Carl Stalling
- Animation by: Manuel Perez; Pete Burness; Ken Champin; Virgil Ross; Gerry Chiniquy
- Layouts by: Hawley Pratt
- Backgrounds by: Paul Julian
- Color process: Technicolor
- Production company: Warner Bros. Cartoons
- Distributed by: Warner Bros. Pictures; The Vitaphone Corporation
- Release date: January 1, 1949
- Running time: 7:19
- Language: English

Wise Quackers is a 1949 Warner Bros. Looney Tunes cartoon directed by Friz Freleng. The film was released on January 1, 1949, and stars Daffy Duck and Elmer Fudd.

The short's title should not be confused with the 1939 Bob Clampett short Wise Quacks.

== Plot ==
In a cold setting, the scene shows a migrating group of birds flying south. Far away from the line is a weary Daffy Duck, doubting himself that he'll manage to make it there. He finally succumbs to the harsh climate and begins diving into the farm of Elmer Fudd, dressed in his hunter attire. Elmer, seizing an opportunity for some game to kill and eat, grabs a nearby makeshift guider and begins directing him towards his farm.

Daffy, not knowing that this is a trick, abides in his directions, careening towards the field, and through a cloud of fog before finally crashing violently into the backyard of the farm. After landing on a pitchfork and jumping into Elmer's area, the hunter prepares to kill him; Daffy, however, offers to let him be his slave to avoid being killed, to which Elmer agrees.

Inside Elmer's house, Daffy spots him shaving, yells out a loud "STOP!", and grabs a nearby towel to wash his face after seating him on a chair, only to flip it upside down. He then dupes Elmer into handing him surgical tools to help him shave, including forceps and "fiveceps". When Elmer finds out he's been tricked, he pulls out his gun on Daffy, only for the duck to scold him saying he wanted "sixceps". Pushed to his limit, Elmer forcefully leads Daffy outside with his gun.

The scene then transitions to outside in the backyard, where Daffy once again attempts to coax Elmer into sparing him, seemingly without any success. He then mentions that he's cooked something special for him, which piques Elmer's interest. He then proceeds to run and quickly return with a meal he's prepared, much to Elmer's delight.

The scene then transitions once again to the inside of the house, where Elmer is excited to taste the banquet Daffy's prepared. Before he can even taste it, however, he's promptly stopped by Daffy, who insists on trying it for himself before Elmer can eat it; after trying a chicken bone, the duck goes back on his word and proceeds to eat nearly the entirety of the repast for himself. Before Elmer can try what's left, Daffy proceeds to eat the last piece, before seemingly having a coughing fit and trying to get out the extremely hot taste, before calming down, and permitting Elmer to eat. When Elmer finally realizes he's been tricked, he exasperatedly chases Daffy out of the shack.

Searching for the wacky duck outside, Daffy promptly appears, grabs the axe Elmer has, and begins to chop down one of the trees in the backyard...which promptly crashes onto his neighbor's house, destroying it in the process. The neighbor calmly goes over to Elmer, asking for his hammer, which Elmer gives. The neighbor then promptly hits him with the hammer and absconds from the scene.

Elmer, at his wits' end, calls for his two pet dogs to capture Daffy. They make plans to catch him, and after the first formation backfires, they work together and lead themselves offscreen to fulfil their duties.

The scene fades back in, where the dogs have finally captured the unruly duck. Just as Elmer is about to punish him, Daffy begs Elmer not to whip him, before putting a whip in his hand and running off. Shortly thereafter, he returns disguised as Abraham Lincoln to scold Elmer for supposedly whipping slaves. "Abraham" promptly confiscates the whip and walks into the distance playing a tune on his bill as the film irises out.

== Voice Cast ==
- Mel Blanc as Daffy Duck / Elmer's Neighor / Dogs
- Arthur Q. Bryan as Elmer Fudd (uncredited)

== Production notes ==
The film makes several references to African-American slaves for comedic effect, and has Daffy uttering the line "Tote dat barge! Lift dat bale!" from the song Ol' Man River. Warner Bros' films dropped the use of racist caricatures by the mid-1950s; this is the last Daffy Duck cartoon to include stereotyped imagery of black people. The bit where Daffy pretends that Elmer is about to whip him (and then scolds him in the guise of Abraham Lincoln) was later reused in the 1953 Bugs Bunny-Yosemite Sam short Southern Fried Rabbit.

== Home Media ==
- VHS 1992 - Daffy Duck: Tales From the Duckside - Warner Home Video
- DVD 2010 - Looney Tunes Super Stars' Daffy Duck: Frustrated Fowl (restored) - Warner Home Video
- Blu-Ray 2026 - Looney Tunes Collector's Vault: Volume 2 (restored) - Warner Archive Collection

== See also ==
- Daffy Duck filmography
- Elmer Fudd filmography
- Looney Tunes and Merrie Melodies filmography (1940–1949)
