= Cracked Quack =

- Directed by: I. Freleng
- Story by: Warren Foster
- Starring: Mel Blanc
- Music by: Carl Stalling
- Animation by: Arthur Davis; Manuel Perez; Ken Champin; Virgil Ross
- Layouts by: Hawley Pratt
- Backgrounds by: Irv Wyner
- Color process: Technicolor
- Production company: Warner Bros. Cartoons
- Distributed by: Warner Bros. Pictures; The Vitaphone Corporation
- Release date: July 5, 1952
- Running time: 7 minutes
- Country: United States
- Language: English

Cracked Quack is a 1952 Warner Bros. Merrie Melodies short directed by Friz Freleng. The cartoon was released on July 5, 1952, and stars Daffy Duck and Porky Pig. This cartoon is notable for being the final Porky Pig cartoon directed by Friz Freleng.

== Plot ==
Daffy Duck, fatigued and disoriented from a failed migration attempt, seeks refuge in a mansion belonging to Porky Pig. Mistaking a stuffed duck for a living companion, Daffy imposes himself in the residence, encountering resistance from Porky's vigilant dog, Rover.

Through various antics and misinterpretations, Daffy's ruse is intermittently challenged, culminating in a confrontation where Porky, oblivious to Daffy's true nature, mistakenly assumes him to be a lifeless prop.

Eventually, a serendipitous encounter with a flock of fellow ducks leads to an unexpected turn of events, leaving Porky's home overrun by avian revelry.

== Cast ==
- Mel Blanc as Daffy Duck, Porky Pig, Duck, Fly, and Rover

== Home media ==
This short is available on the Looney Tunes Collector's Choice: Volume 1 Blu-ray.
