= Beep Prepared =

1961 film

- Title card
- Directed by: Chuck Jones; Maurice Noble
- Story by: John Dunn; Chuck Jones
- Starring: Paul Julian
- Edited by: Treg Brown
- Music by: Milt Franklyn
- Animation by: Bob Bransford; Tom Ray; Ken Harris; Richard Thompson; Harry Love
- Backgrounds by: Philip DeGuard
- Color process: Technicolor
- Production company: Warner Bros. Cartoons
- Distributed by: Warner Bros. Pictures Inc. The Vitaphone Corporation
- Release date: November 11, 1961
- Running time: 6:03
- Country: United States

Beep Prepared is a 1961 Warner Bros. Merrie Melodies American theatrical cartoon short directed by Chuck Jones and designer Maurice Noble. The short was released on November 11, 1961, and stars Wile E. Coyote and the Road Runner. The title is a play on the Boy Scouts of America motto "Be Prepared".

== Plot ==
In the pursuit of the elusive Road Runner (Tid-Bittius Velocitus), Wile E. Coyote (Hungrii Flea-Bagius) encounters a series of mishaps and failed attempts to capture his swift quarry. Following a momentary suspension in mid-air, Coyote plummets to the canyon floor and the cartoon's title and credits are displayed on the dust cloud raised by his impact.

Undeterred by this setback, Coyote endeavors to ensnare the Road Runner by deploying a trip mechanism using his own leg, only to suffer the consequence of one foot being flattened by a passing delivery truck.

Employing higher ground and a bow and arrow, he aims to immobilize the bird, yet inadvertently inflicts injury upon himself when the bow recoils. Further endeavors involve futile attempts to ensnare the Road Runner within a manhole, which the bird effortlessly circumvents using a portable hole, leading to Coyote's descent to a riverbank below.

Subsequent efforts include the utilization of a malfunctioning rocket-powered flying suit, an ill-fated box of ACME Iron Bird Seed, and a misguided utilization of magnetism, which culminates in a collision with an oncoming train. Additional endeavors, such as a spring-loaded pavement block and a pair of malfunctioning machine guns, yield similar outcomes of misfortune and injury for Coyote.

Concluding his pursuit with an ACME Rocket-Sled Kit, Coyote is propelled into the cosmos prematurely, resulting in an explosive demise as he transforms into a Sagittarius-style constellation.

== Awards ==
Beep Prepared was nominated for an Academy Award for Best Animated Short Film, the only Coyote/Road Runner installment to achieve this recognition.

== Crew ==
- Co-Director and Layouts: Maurice Noble
- Story by John Dunn, Chuck Jones
- Animation: Bob Bransford, Tom Ray, Ken Harris, Richard Thompson
- Backgrounds: Philip DeGuard
- Effects Animation: Harry Love
- Film Editor: Treg Brown
- Music: Milt Franklyn
- Produced by David H. DePatie
- Directed by Chuck Jones
