= Looney Tunes =

Animated short film series and media franchise

- Franchise logo since 2024
- Created by: Leon Schlesinger; Hugh Harman; Rudolf Ising
- Original work: Sinkin' in the Bathtub (1930)
- Owners: Warner Bros. Entertainment (Skydance)
- Years: 1930–present

Print publications
- Comics: Comic books

Films and television
- Films: List of feature films
- Short films: List of short films
- Animated series: List of animated TV series
- Television specials: List of TV specials

Games
- Video games: List of video games

Looney Tunes is an American media franchise owned by Warner Bros. Entertainment. The franchise began as a series of animated short films that originally ran from 1930 to 1969, alongside its spin-off series Merrie Melodies, produced by Warner Bros. Cartoons during the golden age of American animation. The theatrical series was revived in the late 1970s, with occasional releases since then. The two series introduced a large cast of characters, including Bugs Bunny, Daffy Duck, and Porky Pig. The term Looney Tunes has since been expanded to also refer to the characters themselves.

Looney Tunes and Merrie Melodies were initially produced by Leon Schlesinger and animators Hugh Harman and Rudolf Ising from 1930 to 1933. Schlesinger assumed full production from 1933 until he sold his studio to Warner Bros. Pictures in 1944, after which it was renamed Warner Bros. Cartoons. The Looney Tunes title was inspired by that of Walt Disney's Silly Symphonies. The shorts initially showcased musical compositions owned by Warner's music publishing interests through the adventures of such characters as Bosko, Foxy and Buddy. However, the shorts gained a higher profile upon the debuts of directors Tex Avery, Friz Freleng, Chuck Jones, Bob Clampett, and Robert McKimson, and voice actor Mel Blanc later in the decade. Porky Pig and Daffy Duck became the featured Looney Tunes characters, while Merrie Melodies featured one-shot cartoons and minor recurring characters.

After Bugs Bunny became popular in the Merrie Melodies shorts of the early 1940s, Looney Tunes moved from black-and-white to color production between 1942 and 1943 (Merrie Melodies having already been in color since 1934). The two series gradually lost their distinctions, and shorts were assigned to each series arbitrarily. From 1942 to 1964, Looney Tunes and Merrie Melodies were the most popular animated shorts in movie theaters.

Looney Tunes has become one of the highest-grossing media franchises of all time, spawning several television series, feature films, comic books, music albums, video games, and amusement park rides. Many of the characters have made and continue to make cameo appearances in television shows, films, and other media. Bugs Bunny, in particular, is regarded as a cultural icon as well as the mascot of Warner Bros., and has a star on the Hollywood Walk of Fame. Many Looney Tunes and Merrie Melodies films are ranked among the greatest animated cartoons of all time, and five of them have won Academy Awards. In 2013, TV Guide counted Looney Tunes as the third greatest television cartoon series of all time, behind The Simpsons and The Flintstones, the latter of which also featured the voice talents of Mel Blanc and Bea Benaderet.

== History ==
Looney Tunes
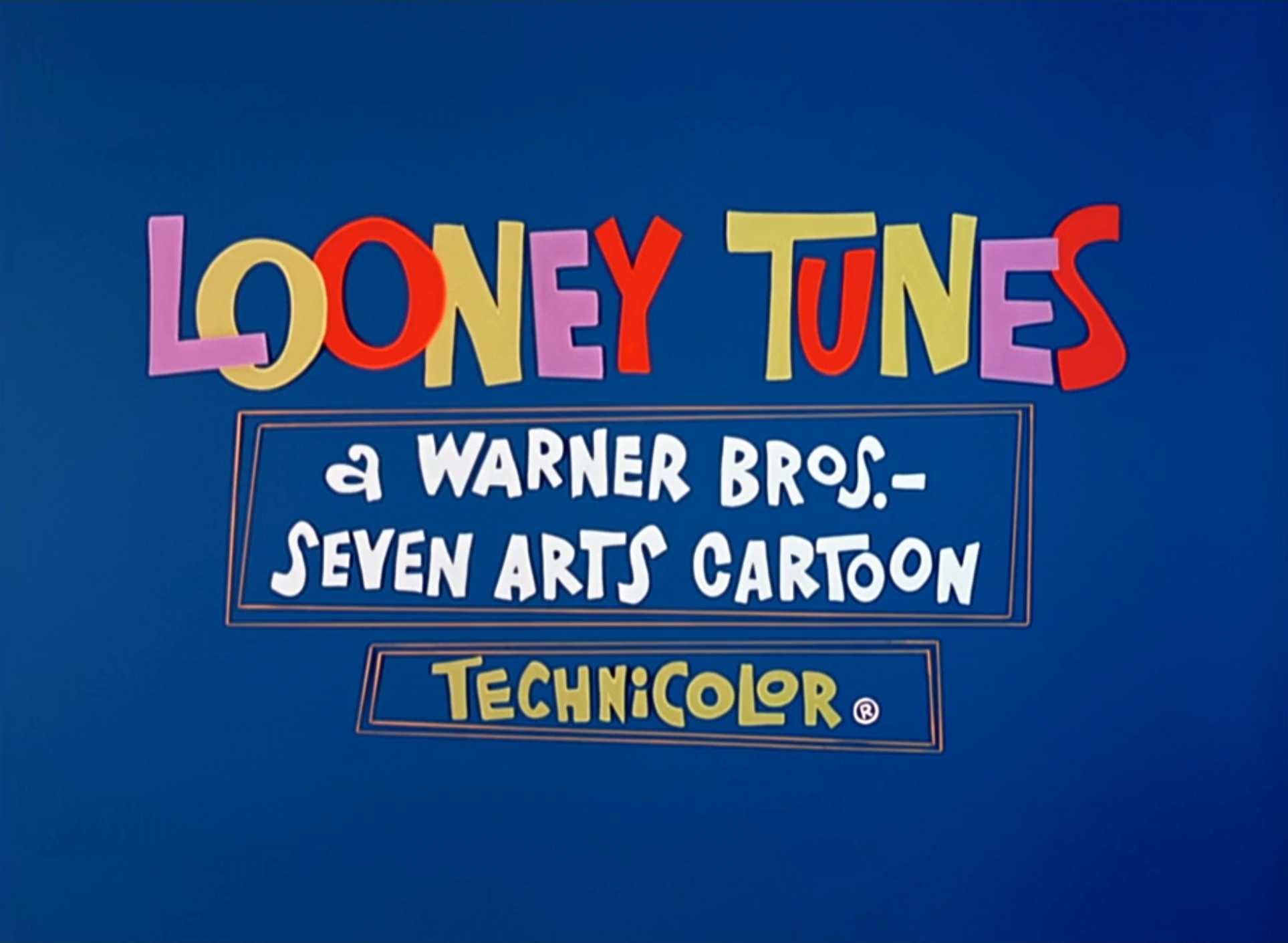
- Final Looney Tunes opening title used for its 1967–1969 entries
- Directed by: Tex Avery; Bob Clampett; Arthur Davis; Friz Freleng; Hugh Harman; Rudolf Ising; Chuck Jones; Robert McKimson; Frank Tashlin; (more)
- Story by: Warren Foster; Tedd Pierce; Michael Maltese; (more)
- Produced by: Hugh Harman; Rudolf Ising; Leon Schlesinger; Edward Selzer; John W. Burton; David H. DePatie; Friz Freleng; William L. Hendricks
- Starring: Mel Blanc; June Foray; Arthur Q. Bryan; Bea Benaderet; Stan Freberg; (more)
- Music by: Carl W. Stalling; Milt Franklyn; William Lava; (more)
- Animation by: Ken Harris; Warren Batchelder; Rod Scribner; Abe Levitow; Gerry Chiniquy; Izzy Ellis; Virgil Ross; Ben Washam; Bill Melendez; Phil Monroe; Manny Gould; Richard Thompson; Norman McCabe; (more)
- Layouts by: Maurice Noble; Hawley Pratt; Robert Gribbroek; (more)
- Backgrounds by: Paul Julian; Pete Alvarado; Philip DeGuard; (more)
- Color process: B&W (1930–1943); Technicolor (1942–present); Cinecolor (1947–1948)
- Production companies: Harman-Ising Productions (1930–1933); Leon Schlesinger Productions (1933–1944); Warner Bros. Cartoons (1944–1964); DePatie–Freleng Enterprises (1964–1967); Format Productions (1965–1967); Warner Bros.-Seven Arts Animation (1967–1969); Warner Bros. Animation (1991–2014); Warner Bros. Pictures Animation (2026–present)
- Distributed by: Warner Bros. Pictures; The Vitaphone Corporation; Vitagraph Company of America
- Release dates: Original series: April 19, 1930—September 20, 1969; Revival series: February 8, 1991–November 14, 1997 (first revival); April 7, 2000 (pre-Baby Looney Tunes); November 1, 2003–November 2, 2004 (second revival); July 30, 2010–June 10, 2014 (third revival); November 6, 2026–present (fourth revival)
- Running time: 6–10 minutes (one reel)

Looney Tunes and Merrie Melodies were so named as a reference to Disney's Silly Symphonies and were initially developed to showcase tracks from Warner Bros.' extensive music library; the title of the first Looney Tunes short, Sinkin' in the Bathtub (1930), is a pun on Singin' in the Bathtub. Between 1934 and 1943, Merrie Melodies were produced in color and Looney Tunes in black-and-white. After 1943, both series were produced in color and became virtually indistinguishable, varying only in their opening theme music and titles. Both series made use of the various Warner Bros. characters. By 1937, the theme music for Looney Tunes was "The Merry-Go-Round Broke Down" by Cliff Friend and Dave Franklin, and the theme music for Merrie Melodies was an adaptation of "Merrily We Roll Along" by Charles Tobias, Murray Mencher and Eddie Cantor.

=== 1930–1933: Harman and Ising era ===
In 1929, to compete against Walt Disney's Silly Symphonies, Warner Bros. Pictures became interested in developing a series of animated shorts to promote their music. They had recently acquired Brunswick Records along with four music publishers for US$28 million (equivalent to $540 million in 2025) and were eager to promote this material for the sales of sheet music and phonograph records. Warner made a deal with Leon Schlesinger to produce cartoons for them. Schlesinger hired Rudolf Ising and Hugh Harman to produce a series of cartoons, impressed by their 1929 proof-of-concept film marketed as "Bosko, The Talk-Ink Kid". The first Looney Tunes short was Sinkin' in the Bathtub starring Bosko, which was released in 1930.

=== 1933–1936: Leon Schlesinger Productions ===
When Harman and Ising left Warner Bros. in 1933 over a budget dispute with Schlesinger, they took with them all the rights of the characters they had created. A new character called Buddy became the only star of the Looney Tunes series for a couple of years but quickly became unpopular. Buddy was usually accompanied in his films by his flapper girlfriend, Cookie, and his dog, Towser. The character would go on to star in 23 short films from 1933 to 1935. Buddy is widely considered to be the worst character in the Looney Tunes franchise. In That's All, Folks! The Art of Warner Bros. Animation, Steve Schneider describes Buddy as "a creature of limitless blandness," and calls Buddy's Day Out "a nondescript adventure spree." Schneider says that "probably the best of the run is his farewell film, Buddy the Gee Man", but "about the most that can be said for Buddy is that he is distinctly forgettable."

New directors including Tex Avery, Friz Freleng and Bob Clampett were brought in or promoted to work with animators in the Schlesinger studio, with Avery's unit housed in a bungalow which the animators dubbed "Termite Terrace". In 1935, Porky Pig, the first major Looney Tunes star, made his debut in the Merrie Melodies cartoon I Haven't Got a Hat, directed by Friz Freleng, featuring an ensemble of characters headed by Beans the Cat. However, after Avery's Looney Tune debut Gold Diggers of '49 it was Porky who emerged as the star instead of Beans. The ensemble characters of I Haven't Got a Hat, such as Oliver Owl and the twin dogs Ham and Ex, were quickly dropped. Beans and his girlfriend would be phased out as well by mid-1936, leaving Porky as the only star of the Schlesinger studio.

=== 1936–1944: More star characters and switch to color ===
The debuts of other Looney Tunes stars soon followed: Daffy Duck in Porky's Duck Hunt (1937), Elmer Fudd in the Merrie Melodies short Elmer's Candid Camera (1940), Bugs Bunny in the Merrie Melodies short A Wild Hare (1940), and Tweety in the Merrie Melodies short A Tale of Two Kitties (1942).

Bugs initially starred in the color Merrie Melodies shorts following the success of 1940's A Wild Hare and formally joined the Looney Tunes series with the release of Buckaroo Bugs in 1944.

Schlesinger began to phase in the production of color Looney Tunes with the 1942 cartoon The Hep Cat. The final black-and-white Looney Tunes short was Puss n' Booty in 1943, directed by Frank Tashlin. The inspiration for the changeover was Warner's decision to re-release only the color cartoons in the Blue Ribbon Classics series of Merrie Melodies. A brief cameo at the end of Tashlin's 1943 cartoon Porky Pig's Feat would be Bugs' only official appearance in a black-and-white Looney Tunes short.

Schlesinger sold the cartoon studio in 1944 to Warner Bros. and went into retirement; he died five years later.

=== 1944–1964: The Golden era ===
More popular Looney Tunes characters were created (most of which first appeared in Merrie Melodies cartoons), such as Pepé Le Pew (debuted in 1945's Odor-able Kitty), Sylvester (debuted in 1945's Life with Feathers), Yosemite Sam (debuted in 1945's Hare Trigger), Foghorn Leghorn (debuted in 1946's Walky Talky Hawky), Marvin the Martian (debuted in 1948's Haredevil Hare), Wile E. Coyote and the Road Runner (debuted in 1949's Fast and Furry-ous), Granny (debuted in 1950's Canary Row), Speedy Gonzales (debuted in 1953's Cat Tails for Two), the Tasmanian Devil (debuted in 1954's Devil May Hare), and Ralph Wolf and Sam Sheepdog (debuted in 1953's Don't Give Up the Sheep).

It was during this era that the series won five Academy Awards:

- Tweetie Pie (1947)
- For Scent-imental Reasons (1949)
- Speedy Gonzales (1955)
- Birds Anonymous (1957)
- Knighty Knight Bugs (1958)

=== 1964–1969: DePatie–Freleng and Seven Arts era ===
During the mid-late 1960s, the shorts were produced by DePatie–Freleng Enterprises (and Format Productions) (1964–1967) and Warner Bros.-Seven Arts (1967–1969) after Warner Bros. shut down their animation studio. The shorts from this era can be identified by their different title sequence, featuring stylized limited animation and graphics on a black background and a new arrangement, by William Lava, of "The Merry-Go-Round Broke Down" which had first been used in the 1963 experimental short Now Hear This directed by Chuck Jones.

In 1967, Warner Bros.-Seven Arts commissioned an animation studio in South Korea to redraw 79 black-and-white Looney Tunes cartoons produced from 1935 to 1943 in color which were syndicated to TV stations from the late 1960s to the early 1990s.

The original Looney Tunes theatrical series ran from 1930's Sinkin' in the Bathtub to 1969's Injun Trouble by Robert McKimson.

A Cool Cat cartoon called Stage Cat was planned, about Cool Cat being in a stage production, but it was cancelled when Warner Bros.-Seven Arts Animation shut down.

=== 1970–1999: Syndication and return to television and film ===
Looney Tunes franchise logo used from 1985 to 2024, based on the wordmark used in the original shorts from 1939 to 1964

The Looney Tunes series' popularity was further strengthened when it began airing on network and syndicated television in the 1950s under various titles and formats. The Looney Tunes shorts were broadcast with edits to remove scenes of violence (particularly suicidal gags and scenes of characters performing dangerous stunts that impressionable viewers could easily imitate), stereotypes, and alcohol consumption.

Production of theatrical animated shorts was dormant from 1969 until 1979, when new shorts were made to introduce the Looney Tunes to a new generation of audiences. New shorts have been produced and released sporadically for theaters since then, though usually as promotional tie-ins with various family movies produced by Warner Bros. While many have been released in limited releases theatrically for Academy Award consideration, only a few have gained theatrical releases with movies.

In the 1970s through the early 1990s, several feature-film compilations and television specials were produced, mostly centering on Bugs Bunny and/or Daffy Duck, with a mixture of new and old footage. These releases include The Bugs Bunny/Road Runner Movie (1979), The Looney Looney Looney Bugs Bunny Movie (1981), Bugs Bunny's 3rd Movie: 1001 Rabbit Tales (1982), Daffy Duck's Fantastic Island (1983), and Daffy Duck's Quackbusters (1988).

In 1976, the Looney Tunes characters made their way into the amusement park business when they became the mascots for Marriott's two Great America theme parks in Gurnee, Illinois, and Santa Clara, California. After the Gurnee park was sold to Six Flags in 1984, they also claimed the rights to use the characters at the other Six Flags parks, which continues to the present. (Warner Bros. parent company Time Warner would own the Six Flags chain in whole or part for most of the 1990s.)

Between 1985 and 1992, AMC Theatres showed selected late 1950s/early 1960s-era Warner Bros. cartoons before several films, most of them comedies and family-oriented movies.

In 1988, several Looney Tunes characters appeared in cameo roles in the Disney film Who Framed Roger Rabbit. The more significant cameos featured Bugs, Daffy, Porky, Tweety, and Yosemite Sam. It is the only time in which Looney Tunes characters have shared screen time with their rivals at Disney (producers of the film)—particularly in the scenes where Bugs and Mickey Mouse are skydiving, and when Daffy and Donald Duck are performing their "Dueling Pianos" sequence.

On July 10, 1989, after a battle with heart problems, Mel Blanc died at the Cedars-Sinai Medical Center of cardiovascular disease. A picture depicting the Looney Tunes characters entitled "Speechless" was released shortly after his death.

Viacom-owned Nickelodeon aired Looney Tunes cartoons in a show called Looney Tunes on Nickelodeon between 1988 and 1999. Initially, the Nickelodeon package included cartoons that were typically omitted from the higher-profile Saturday morning network and syndicated weekday packages, including black-and-white Bosko cartoons that had not aired in many years and cartoons from the late DePatie–Freleng and Seven Arts eras. In January 1999, it was reported that the cartoons shown on Nickelodeon would move to Cartoon Network in the fall of that year. To date, Looney Tunes on Nickelodeon is the longest-airing animated series on the network that was not a Nicktoon.

In 1991, the Looney Tunes characters made their appearance at Warner Bros. Movie World on the Gold Coast in Australia. It marked the launch of "Looney Tunes Land", the park's inaugural themed area.

In 1996, Space Jam, a live-action animated film, was released to theaters starring Bugs Bunny and basketball player Michael Jordan. Despite a mixed critical reception, the film was a major box-office success, grossing nearly $100 million in the U.S. alone, almost becoming the first non-Disney animated film to achieve that feat. For a two-year period, it was the highest grossing non-Disney animated film ever. The film also introduced the character Lola Bunny, who subsequently became another recurring member of the Looney Tunes cast, usually as a love interest for Bugs.

In 1997, Bugs Bunny was featured on a U.S. 32 cent postage stamp, the first of five Looney Tunes themed stamps to be issued.

The Looney Tunes also achieved success in the area of television during this era, with appearances in several originally produced series, including Taz-Mania (1991, starring Taz) and The Sylvester & Tweety Mysteries (1995, starring Sylvester, Tweety, and Granny). The gang also made frequent cameos in the 1990 spinoff series Tiny Toon Adventures, from executive producer Steven Spielberg, where they played teachers and mentors to a younger generation of cartoon characters (Plucky Duck, Hamton J. Pig, Babs and Buster Bunny, etc.), plus occasional cameos in the later Warner Bros. shows such as Animaniacs (also from Spielberg) and Histeria!. Traditional cel animation was used to animate the characters for Looney Tunes' cartoons until 1999 when it was replaced with digital ink and paint animation.

In 1979, Bugs Bunny's Christmas Carol premiered. After The Chocolate Chase, there would not be another short released for seven years. In 1990, it was made so there would be about one short per year until 1998. In 2003, there would be seven shorts produced to promote Looney Tunes: Back in Action. The first of these to be released was Whizzard of Ow, which appeared on a DVD release of Back in Action that was sold exclusively at Wal-Mart stores. Only about half of the shorts were shown in theaters; the rest would not be made available until 2004, when all seven shorts were included on the general home video release of the film. In 2010, five computer-animated shorts would be released and directed by Matthew O'Callaghan, who would also direct another short, Flash in the Pain, in 2014.

=== 2000–2014: Network exploration ===
In March 2000, it was revealed that the entire Looney Tunes and Merrie Melodies library would be exclusive to Cartoon Network, starting with the fall of that year. Looney Tunes shorts were still airing on Disney's ABC as part of The Bugs Bunny and Tweety Show at the time and the decision led to the show's cancellation. This decision would remain in effect for over 20 years until MeTV began airing the classic Warner Bros. cartoons (along with MGM and Paramount's library) in January 2021. In 2003, another feature film was released, this time in an attempt to recapture the spirit of the original shorts: the live-action/animated Looney Tunes: Back in Action. Although the film was not financially successful, it was met with mixed-to-positive reviews from film critics and has been argued by animation historians and fans as the finest original feature-length appearance of the cartoon characters. In 2006, Warner Home Video released a new and Christmas-themed Looney Tunes direct-to-video film called Bah, Humduck! A Looney Tunes Christmas, a parody of Charles Dickens' A Christmas Carol. Other Looney Tunes TV series made during this time were Baby Looney Tunes (2002–2005), Duck Dodgers (2003–2005) and Loonatics Unleashed (2005–2007).

On October 22, 2007, Looney Tunes and Merrie Melodies cartoons became available for the first time in high definition via Microsoft's Xbox Live service, including some in Spanish. From February 29 – May 18, 2008, many Looney Tunes artifacts, including original animation cels and concept drawings, were on display at the Butler Institute of American Art in Youngstown, Ohio, just off the campus of Youngstown State University, near where the Warners lived early in life.

At the 2009 Cartoon Network upfront, The Looney Tunes Show was announced. After several delays, the series premiered on May 3, 2011. Produced by Warner Bros. Animation, the series centers on Bugs and Daffy as they leave the woods and move to the suburbs with "colorful neighbors" including Sylvester, Tweety, Granny, Yosemite Sam, etc. The series introduced the character Tina Russo, a duck who becomes Daffy's girlfriend. The show also features 2-minute music videos titled respectfully "Merrie Melodies" (as a tribute to the Looney Tunes sister shorts) which features the characters singing original songs, as well as CGI animated shorts starring Wile E. Coyote and the Road Runner (which were removed after the first season). The series was cancelled after its second season.

Also, Wile E. Coyote and the Road Runner returned to the big screen in a series of 3-D shorts that preceded select Warner Bros. films. There were six in the works that began with the first short, Coyote Falls, that preceded the film Cats & Dogs: The Revenge of Kitty Galore, which was released on July 30, 2010. On September 24, 2010, Fur of Flying preceded the film, Legend of the Guardians: The Owls of Ga'Hoole, and on December 17, 2010, Rabid Rider preceded the film, Yogi Bear. On June 8, 2011, Warner Bros. Animation announced that there would be more Looney Tunes 3-D theatrical shorts; one of them titled Daffy's Rhapsody with Daffy Duck and Elmer Fudd, another being I Tawt I Taw a Puddy Tat with Sylvester, Tweety, and Granny. Daffy's Rhapsody was to precede the film Happy Feet Two, until the studio decided to premiere I Tawt I Taw a Puddy Tat instead. Daffy's Rhapsody instead premiered in 2012, preceding Journey 2: The Mysterious Island. All five shorts were directed by Matthew O'Callaghan.

In 2012, several announcements were made about a Looney Tunes reboot film set in the Acme warehouse in development. Former Saturday Night Live cast member Jenny Slate was said to be on board as writer for the new film. Jeffrey Clifford, Harry Potter producer David Heyman, and Dark Shadows writers David Katzenberg and Seth Grahame-Smith were slated to produce the film. On August 27, 2014, writers Ashley Miller and Zack Stentz were hired to script the film, directors Glenn Ficarra and John Requa were in talks to direct the film, while actor Steve Carell was rumored to be starring in a lead role. By October 2014, the project was no longer in the works.

=== 2015–2022: Revival ===
At the 2014 Cartoon Network upfront, another series titled Wabbit: A Looney Tunes Production (later New Looney Tunes) was announced. Starring Bugs Bunny, the series premiered on both Cartoon Network and its sister channel Boomerang in late 2015. The series had an unusually slow rollout, with the series being moved to the Boomerang streaming service in 2017, and was eventually cancelled on January 30, 2020.

On June 11, 2018, another series, titled Looney Tunes Cartoons, was announced by Warner Bros. Animation. It premiered on May 27, 2020, on the streaming service HBO Max. The series features "1,000 minutes of new one-to-six minute cartoons featuring the brand's marquee characters", voiced by their current voice actors in "simple, gag-driven and visually vibrant stories" that are rendered by multiple artists employing "a visual style that will resonate with fans", most noticeably having a style reminiscent of the styles of Tex Avery, Bob Clampett, Chuck Jones, Friz Freleng and Robert McKimson. According to co-executive producer Peter Browngardt, "We're not doing guns, but we can do cartoony violence — TNT, the Acme stuff. All that was kind of grandfathered in." Sam Register, president of Warner Bros. Animation also served as a co-executive producer for the series. The final season was released on July 27, 2023, and a bonus episode was released on June 13, 2024.

On February 11, 2021, it was announced two new series were in the works: Bugs Bunny Builders and Tweety Mysteries. Bugs Bunny Builders, aimed towards preschoolers, premiered on Cartoon Network as part of Cartoonito and HBO Max on July 25, 2022. Tweety Mysteries would have been a live-action/animated hybrid aimed toward girls and would have aired on Cartoon Network. However, the series was cancelled without airing in December 2022.

A sequel to Space Jam titled Space Jam: A New Legacy, starring basketball player LeBron James, was released in theaters and HBO Max on July 16, 2021, after a Los Angeles special screening on July 12, 2021. It is a film with a story of LeBron James' second son, Dom (Cedric Joe), who gets kidnapped by an evil AI named Al. G Rhythm (Don Cheadle), into the Warner Bros. server-verse. LeBron then assembles the Tune Squad to play against the algorithm and get his son back. It received generally negative reviews and underperformed at the box office.

=== 2022–2026: Warner Bros. Discovery ownership ===
A reboot of Tiny Toon Adventures titled Tiny Toons Looniversity premiered on September 8, 2023, on Max and then aired the following day on Cartoon Network. The Looney Tunes characters reprise their roles as the professors at Acme Looniversity in this series.

In September 2021, it was reported that a film based on the Looney Tunes Cartoons, titled The Day the Earth Blew Up and starring Daffy Duck and Porky Pig, was announced for release on HBO Max and Cartoon Network. However, it was reported in August 2022 that the film would instead be shopped around to other streaming services. In October 2023, it was announced the film would instead be released in theaters, becoming the first animated non-compilation feature film in the franchise to do so. In early August 2024, it was announced that Ketchup Entertainment acquired the North American theatrical distribution rights to the film. The film was given a one-week limited release in Los Angeles on December 13, 2024, before a wide release in theaters in the United States on March 14, 2025.

On December 31, 2022, 256 classic Looney Tunes and Merrie Melodies shorts were removed from HBO Max, including What's Opera, Doc? and Duck Amuck, though many were later re-added in March 2024 when the shorts on the service were rotated.

In late August 2024, it was reported that Warner Bros. was planning to relaunch the Looney Tunes theatrical film series in 2028. In October 2024, it was reported that Warner Bros. Pictures Animation was working on a "super secret Looney Tunes project" with directors Todd Wilderman and Hamish Grieve. That project was later revealed to be a new short film titled Daffy Season, which premiered at the 2026 Annecy International Animation Film Festival, and was released in theaters alongside WBPA's 2026 animated film adaptation of The Cat in the Hat.

On March 16, 2025, two days after The Day the Earth Blew Up expanded to a wide release, all of the classic Looney Tunes and Merrie Melodies shorts were removed from the Max streaming service. Three days later, it was reported that Warner Bros. was in talks with Ketchup Entertainment, who had distributed The Day the Earth Blew Up in the United States, to sell the distribution rights to the shelved movie Coyote vs. Acme. On March 31, the negotiations proved successful. The film was released in theaters in the United States on August 28, 2026 and received positive reviews.

At CinemaCon 2025, Warner Bros. Pictures Animation confirmed development on a new Looney Tunes animated feature film.

On August 15, 2025, the classic Looney Tunes and Merrie Melodies shorts began streaming on the ad-supported free streaming service Tubi.

In December 2025, Jorge R. Gutiérrez teased that he was developing a new animated feature film based on and centered around Speedy Gonzales. In January 2026, Warner Bros. Pictures Animation greenlit the Speedy Gonzales feature film.

On January 26, 2026, it was announced that Turner Classic Movies would air the series, with each short preceding feature films as a homage to its origins.

=== 2026–present: Skydance ownership ===
After Paramount Skydance acquired Warner Bros. Discovery in October 2026, TheWrap reported that Warner Bros. Pictures Animation was developing a new Looney Tunes feature film described as a "heist film in the vein of Ocean's Eleven".

=== Home media ===
In the 1980s, the shorts received VHS releases, with the pre-August 1948 shorts released by MGM/UA Home Video and the post-July 1948 shorts released by Warner Home Video. In 2003, Warner Home Video began releasing select shorts on DVD, aimed at collectors, in four-disc sets known as the Looney Tunes Golden Collection starting with Volume 1. This continued until 2008, when the final volume of the Golden Collection was released. Then, from 2010 until 2013, the company released the Looney Tunes Super Stars DVDs. There have been numerous complaints regarding the Super Stars releases, however (particularly the first two), having the post-1953 shorts in a 16:9 widescreen format. The last DVD in the Super Stars series was Sylvester and Hippety Hopper: Marsupial Mayhem, released on April 23, 2013. 2010 and 2011 saw the releases of The Essential Bugs Bunny and The Essential Daffy Duck DVDs. In 2011, the shorts were released on Blu-ray Disc for the first time with the Looney Tunes Platinum Collection series. On September 19, 2017, Warner Home Video's Warner Archive Collection released the five-disc Porky Pig 101 DVD set.

In 2023, it was announced that a new line of single-disc Blu-ray sets called the Looney Tunes Collector's Choice would release beginning on May 30. The following shorts known to be on this set are all newly remastered from the original negatives. It is a successor to the Looney Tunes Platinum Collection DVD/Blu-ray sets. Four Blu-ray sets were released until November 26, 2024. A two-disc successor to Collector's Choice, titled Looney Tunes Collector's Vault, began releasing on June 17, 2025.

== Licensing and ownership ==
In 1933, Harman and Ising left Warner Bros. Pictures, taking the rights to Bosko with them. However, Warner Bros. retained the rights to the cartoons and the Looney Tunes and Merrie Melodies brand names, leaving their former producer Leon Schlesinger to start his own animation studio to continue the Looney Tunes series. With their retained Bosko rights, Harman and Ising began making cartoons at Metro-Goldwyn-Mayer in 1934 until they were fired in 1937 due to a lack of success. MGM proceeded to form their own animation department to create its own cartoons. Time Warner eventually acquired Bosko from Harman and Ising's estates. Meanwhile, the Schlesinger studio continued to make popular cartoons until 1944 when Schlesinger sold his studio to Warner Bros. Since then, Warner Bros. has owned all rights to all post-1933 characters created by Leon Schlesinger Productions and Warner Bros. Cartoons, even after the rights to individual cartoons were placed in other hands.

In February 1955, Warner Bros. sold the television distribution rights to 191 of its cartoons (which included the black-and-white Looney Tunes and the black-and-white Merrie Melodies made after Harman and Ising left) to Guild Films. The deal was done through Sunset Productions, an entity owned by Warner Bros. that became "Warner Bros. TV Commercial and Industrial Films" in April 1957 and was merged into Warner Bros. Cartoons in January 1960. The cartoons were distributed by Guild Films until it went bankrupt in January 1961, after which the TV rights would return to WB and then be acquired by Seven Arts Associated. Seven Arts bought WB in 1967, resulting in the TV distribution rights to the 191 black-and-white cartoons returning to WB.

In 1956, Associated Artists Productions (a.a.p.) acquired the copyrights to most of Warner Bros.' pre-1950 library, including all Merrie Melodies (except for those sold to Guild and Lady, Play Your Mandolin!) and color Looney Tunes shorts that were released prior to August 1948, while Warner retained character merchandising rights. Unlike the previous TV package, this package had the Warner titles kept intact and an "Associated Artists Productions presents" title inserted at the head of each reel (as a result, each post-1936 Merrie Melodies cartoon and pre-1956 Blue Ribbon cartoon had the song "Merrily We Roll Along" playing twice). Two years later, United Artists bought a.a.p. (which had also bought Paramount's Popeye films) who merged the company into its television division, United Artists Television. In 1981, UA was sold to MGM. In 1982, Warner Communications was in talks to buy back rights to the pre-1950 Warner Bros. Pictures library (which consists of the live-action and animation short titles made before 1948) from MGM/UA for $100 million in cash. The deal was called off on July 28 of that year; the negotiations fell apart because of dozens of unresolved points, probably relating to the oldest Warner Bros. films. When in 1986, Ted Turner acquired all of MGM's legacy content up to that point, he also acquired the rights to the a.a.p. library. Turner's company, Turner Broadcasting System (whose Turner Entertainment Co. division oversaw the film library), was purchased by Warner Bros.' corporate parent, Time Warner, in 1996. When MGM/UA terminated its distribution deal with Time Warner in 1999, it surrendered its home video rights to the a.a.p. library to Warner Home Video, restoring full rights to all of the pre-August 1948 cartoons to Warner Bros.

Starting in 1960, the cartoons were repackaged into several different TV programs that remained popular for several decades before being purchased by Turner Broadcasting System. Turner's Cartoon Network reran the cartoons from its launch in 1992 until 2004, again from 2009 until 2017, before making a temporary return in April 2023 to celebrate WB's 100th anniversary. The Looney Tunes Show (not to be confused with the 2010s animated series of the same name), an early 2000s anthology produced by Warner Bros. Animation for the network, was broadcast from 2001 to 2004. The show featured shorts from the original Looney Tunes and Merrie Melodies theatrical series. In 2002, classic cartoons began airing on CN's sister channel Boomerang. Beginning in 2021, the classic cartoons are licensed to Weigel Broadcasting-owned MeTV. After WarnerMedia merged with Discovery Inc. in 2022, the classic cartoons began airing on Discovery Family. In 2024, the classic cartoons began airing on MeTV's sister channel MeTV Toons. After Warner Bros. Discovery Global Linear Networks was folded into Paramount Media Networks in 2026, the classic cartoons began airing on Comedy Central.

=== Public domain status ===
Five dozen Looney Tunes and Merrie Melodies shorts from before 1944 have fallen into the American public domain and are thus freely distributed through various unofficial releases. All shorts from 1930 are in the public domain due to copyright expiration. All shorts from 1931 and most shorts from 1932 are believed to be in the public domain due to non-renewal. The earliest short with a known copyright renewal is Ride Him, Bosko! from 1932.

== Characters ==
The major characters of the original Looney Tunes and Merrie Melodies series are Bugs Bunny, a clever and insouciant rabbit who is portrayed as a trickster; Daffy Duck, a black duck who was originally portrayed as a screwball, but later became greedy and egocentric; Porky Pig, a stuttering pig who often appears as the straight man to Daffy, and is the oldest of the franchise's recurring characters; Sylvester the Cat, his prey Tweety (a small canary), and their elderly owner Granny; Wile E. Coyote and the Road Runner, who routinely engage in high-speed chases in their home in the Southwest American desert; Elmer Fudd, an unintelligent hunter who is Bugs' oldest nemesis; Yosemite Sam, a hot-tempered cowboy who is another of Bugs' archenemies; Foghorn Leghorn, a rooster who is known for his often excessive ranting; Marvin the Martian, an alien commander from the planet Mars, who aims to conquer the Earth; the Tasmanian Devil (often nicknamed "Taz" in later media), a vicious, brutal marsupial with an insatiable appetite; Pepé Le Pew, a French skunk who is always looking for love and romance; and Speedy Gonzales, the self-proclaimed "fastest mouse in all of Mexico". One additional major character was introduced in post-Golden Age Looney Tunes media (starting with Space Jam): Lola Bunny, a female rabbit who is usually portrayed as Bugs' girlfriend.

== Racial stereotypes and censorship controversies ==
Hittin' the Trail for Hallelujah Land

Jungle Jitters

Due to content considered offensive, stereotyped or insensitive, in 1968 United Artists, then the owners of the pre-August 1948 color cartoon library, removed the "Censored Eleven" episodes of Looney Tunes and Merrie Melodies cartoons from broadcast or distribution. Depictions included those of African Americans (as in Coal Black and de Sebben Dwarfs and Jungle Jitters), Native Americans, Japanese people (especially during WWII, as in Tokio Jokio and Bugs Bunny Nips the Nips), Germans, Italians, White Southerners, and Mexicans.

In 1999, Cartoon Network ceased broadcast of all of Speedy Gonzales' cartoons, due to concerns about stereotyping of Mexicans. Many Latinos protested that they were not offended, and expressed fondness for Speedy; the character's shorts were made available for broadcast on CN again in 2002.

Many Warner Bros. cartoons contain fleeting or sometimes extended gags that make reference to racial or ethnic stereotypes, or use ethnic humor. The release of the Looney Tunes Golden Collection: Volume 3 includes a disclaimer at the beginning of each DVD in the volume given by Whoopi Goldberg. She explains that the cartoons are products of their time and contain racial and ethnic stereotypes that "were wrong then and they are wrong today", but the cartoons are presented on the DVD uncut and uncensored because "editing them would be the same as denying that the stereotypes existed." A similarly phrased written disclaimer is shown at the beginning of each DVD in the Looney Tunes Golden Collection: Volume 4, Volume 5, and Volume 6 sets, as well as the Daffy Duck, Foghorn Leghorn, and Porky Pig Looney Tunes Super Stars sets, the Looney Tunes Platinum Collection: Volume 2 and Volume 3 sets, the Porky Pig 101 set, the Looney Tunes Collector's Vault: Volume 2 and Volume 3 sets, the Warner Bros. Home Entertainment Academy Awards Animation Collection, and the HBO Max and Tubi releases and some MeTV airings of the shorts. After Warner Bros. Discovery Global Linear Networks was folded into Paramount Media Networks in 2026, a similarly phrased written disclaimer is also shown at the beginning of the Comedy Central airings of the shorts.

== Accolades ==
=== Inducted into the National Film Registry ===
- Porky in Wackyland (1938), selected in 2000
- Duck Amuck (1953), selected in 1999
- One Froggy Evening (1955), selected in 2003
- What's Opera, Doc? (1957), selected in 1992

=== Academy Award for Best Animated Short Film (Cartoon) ===
- Tweetie Pie (1947) (MM)
- For Scent-imental Reasons (1949) (LT)
- Speedy Gonzales (1955) (MM)
- Birds Anonymous (1957) (MM)
- Knighty Knight Bugs (1958) (LT)

=== Academy Award nominations ===
- Swooner Crooner (1944)
- Walky Talky Hawky (1946)
- Mouse Wreckers (1949)
- From A to Z-Z-Z-Z (1954)
- Sandy Claws (1955)
- Tabasco Road (1957)
- Mexicali Shmoes (1959)
- Mouse and Garden (1960)
- High Note (1960)
- The Pied Piper of Guadalupe (1961)
- Beep Prepared (1961)
- Now Hear This (1963)

== Related media ==
=== Television series ===
Series marked with * are compilations of earlier shorts.

- The Bugs Bunny Show (1960–2000)*
- The Porky Pig Show (1964–1967)*
- The Road Runner Show (1966–1973)*
- The Merrie Melodies Show (1972)*
- Merrie Melodies Starring Bugs Bunny & Friends (1990–1994)*
- Tiny Toon Adventures (1990–1992)
- Taz-Mania (1991–1995)
- The Plucky Duck Show (1992)
- The Sylvester & Tweety Mysteries (1995–2000)
- Bugs 'n' Daffy (1995–1998)*
- Pinky, Elmyra & the Brain (1998–1999)
- Baby Looney Tunes (2002–2005)
- Duck Dodgers (2003–2005)
- Loonatics Unleashed (2005–2007)
- The Looney Tunes Show (2011–2013)
- New Looney Tunes (2015–2020)
- Looney Tunes Cartoons (2020–2024)
- Bugs Bunny Builders (2022–2025)
- Tiny Toons Looniversity (2023–2025)

=== Television specials ===
- Daffy Duck and Porky Pig Meet the Groovie Goolies (1972)
- Bugs and Daffy's Carnival of the Animals (1976)
- Bugs Bunny's Easter Special (1977)*
- Bugs Bunny's Howl-oween Special (1977)*
- Bugs Bunny's Thanksgiving Diet (1979)*
- Bugs Bunny's Looney Christmas Tales (1979)
- Bugs Bunny's Bustin' Out All Over (1980)
- The Bugs Bunny Mystery Special (1980)*
- Bugs vs. Daffy: Battle of the Music Video Stars (1988)*
- Cartoon All-Stars to the Rescue (1990)
- Bugs Bunny's Overtures to Disaster (1991)*

=== Films ===
==== Compilation films ====
- The Bugs Bunny/Road Runner Movie (1979)
- The Looney Looney Looney Bugs Bunny Movie (1981)
- Bugs Bunny's 3rd Movie: 1001 Rabbit Tales (1982)
- Daffy Duck's Fantastic Island (1983)
- Daffy Duck's Quackbusters (1988)

==== Feature films ====
- Two Guys from Texas (1948) (cameo of Bugs Bunny only)
- My Dream Is Yours (1949) (cameos of Bugs Bunny and Tweety Bird only)
- Who Framed Roger Rabbit (1988) (cameos only)
- Gremlins 2: The New Batch (1990) (cameos of Bugs Bunny, Daffy Duck and Porky Pig only)
- Space Jam (1996)
- Looney Tunes: Back in Action (2003)
- Scooby-Doo 2: Monsters Unleashed (2004) (cameo of Taz only)
- Space Jam: A New Legacy (2021)
- The Day the Earth Blew Up (2024)
- Coyote vs. Acme (2026)

==== Direct-to-video ====
- Tiny Toon Adventures: How I Spent My Vacation (1992)
- Tweety's High-Flying Adventure (2000)
- Baby Looney Tunes' Eggs-traordinary Adventure (2003)
- Bah, Humduck! A Looney Tunes Christmas (2006)
- Justice League: The New Frontier (2008) (cameo of Bugs Bunny only)
- Looney Tunes: Rabbits Run (2015)
- King Tweety (2022)
- Taz: Quest for Burger (2023)

=== Comic books ===
Looney Tunes comic books were published beginning in 1941 by Dell Comics under license. These comics, like many published by Dell, were produced in partnership with Western Publishing. After Dell and Western ended their partnership in 1962, Western continued the series under their Gold Key Comics and Whitman imprints through 1984. Beginning in 1990, DC Comics, which is owned by Warner Bros., has published Looney Tunes comics.

==== Dell Comics (1941–1962) ====
- Looney Tunes and Merrie Melodies Comics #1–165 (1941–1955)/Looney Tunes #166–246 (1955–1962)
- Bugs Bunny #1–85 (1942–1962)
- Porky Pig #1–81 (1942–1962)
- Tweety and Sylvester #1–37 (1952–1962)
- Daffy Duck #1–30 (1953–1962)
- Looney Tunes #166–246 (1955–1962)
- Beep Beep The Road Runner #1–14 (1958–1962)

==== Western Publishing (1962–1984) ====
- Bugs Bunny #86–245 (1962–1984)
- Daffy Duck #31–145 (1962–1984)
- Tweety and Sylvester #1–120 (1963–1984)
- Porky Pig #1–109 (1965–1984)
- Yosemite Sam and Bugs Bunny #1–80 (1970–1983)
- Beep Beep The Road Runner #1–105 (1971–1984)
- Looney Tunes #1–47 (1975–1984)

==== DC Comics (1990–2024) ====
- Bugs Bunny #1–3 (1990); #1–3 (1993)
- Looney Tunes #1–281 (1994–2024)

=== Video games ===
Video games based on Looney Tunes characters began in 1979 with the Road Runner pinball machine. More titles would continue to be released as video game hardware evolved throughout the 1980s, 1990s, 2000s, and 2010s. Prominent characters who have received multiple video games include Bugs Bunny, Daffy Duck, the Tasmanian Devil, Wile E. Coyote and the Road Runner, Speedy Gonzales, and Sylvester and Tweety.

== See also ==
- Merrie Melodies, another series of animated cartoons also produced by Warner Bros. Pictures between 1931 and 1969
- Silly Symphony, a series of animated shorts produced by Walt Disney Productions between 1929 and 1939
- Happy Harmonies, a series of animated shorts distributed by MGM between 1934 and 1938
- Warner Bros. Cartoons
  - List of Warner Bros. cartoons with Blue Ribbon reissues
