= Ken Harris =

American animator (1898–1982)

- Born: Karyl Ross Harris; July 31, 1898; Tulare County, California, U.S.
- Died: March 24, 1982 (aged 83); Woodland Hills, California, U.S.
- Occupations: Animator, race car driver, director, writer, storyboard artist
- Years active: 1926–1982
- Employer(s): Romer Grey Studio (1930–1931); Warner Bros. Cartoons (1931–1963); MGM Animation/Visual Arts (1963–1967); DePatie-Freleng Enterprises (1963); Hanna-Barbera (1964); Richard Williams Productions (1967–1982)
- Spouse(s): Alta (1927–1963; her death); Kathryn (1966–1982; his death)

Karyl Ross "Ken" Harris (July 31, 1898 – March 24, 1982) was an American animator best known for his work at Warner Bros. Cartoons under the supervision of director Chuck Jones.

== Life and career ==
Ken Harris was born in Tulare County, California. He finished his education at an unknown college in Stockton, New Jersey. His first job as an artist was for Sid Ziff, where he sold some cartoons to him here and there. Then he worked for the Los Angeles Herald Examiner, from 1927 to around 1930, when he joined the ill-fated Romer Grey studio, owned by the son of successful Western author Zane Grey. Following the completion of at least two cartoons, the Grey studio, failing to find a distributor, closed in 1931.

Harris joined Leon Schlesinger Productions within the Friz Freleng unit, then producing the higher-budgeted Merrie Melodies shorts. Upon Freleng's departure at the end of 1937, Harris was relocated into the Frank Tashlin unit. Several months later, Tashlin himself left and the unit was taken over by Chuck Jones, beginning an association between Jones and Harris that lasted until 1962, the longest time an animator spent with a director at the studio. Harris briefly animated for the UPA short The Brotherhood of Man. A highly-productive animator capable of completing large volumes of footage with relative ease, Harris, having finished his daily footage quotas ahead of schedule, would sometimes go play tennis and buy a new car during the workday, according to Jerry Beck and assistant animator Corny Cole. Jones described him as "a virtuoso. Ken Harris did it all." Dan Backslide, one of the characters from the Jones short The Dover Boys, was a caricature of Harris.

After Jones left Warner's, Harris worked with former animator Phil Monroe on two cartoons before Warner Bros. Pictures closed its cartoon department. In 1963, Harris worked briefly for Friz Freleng on the titles of The Pink Panther (1963), then for Hanna-Barbera on their first feature film Hey There It's Yogi Bear! (1964), then rejoined Jones at MGM for three years. After work as an animator on How the Grinch Stole Christmas! (1966) — directed by Jones, a longtime friend of Dr. Seuss — Harris came to the studio of independent animator Richard Williams in London in 1967, in which he became Williams' simultaneous mentor and employee. Harris's credits with him included A Christmas Carol (1971) — as animator of Ebenezer Scrooge — the opening titles of The Return of the Pink Panther (1975), and the still-unfinished animated feature The Thief and the Cobbler (animating the eponymous thief, whose body language and facial expressions are highly reminiscent of Harris's earlier work animating Wile E. Coyote for Jones).

The many scenes Harris animated included Wile E. Coyote consuming earthquake pills in Hopalong Casualty and the lengthy dance sequence in What's Opera, Doc?.

Harris died on March 24, 1982, from Parkinson's disease in Woodland, California, at 83 years of age.

== Awards ==
At the 1981 Annie Awards, ASIFA-Hollywood awarded Harris the Winsor McCay Award for lifetime achievement in the field of animation.
