= List of Looney Tunes Cartoons episodes =

This is a list of episodes from the American animated television series Looney Tunes Cartoons. The show premiered on May 27, 2020, on HBO Max.

== Series overview ==
Season	Episodes		Originally released		
Season	Episodes		First released	Last released	Network
1	31	10	May 27, 2020		HBO Max (Note: The streaming service was rebranded as "Max," which ran from 2023 to 2025, before reverting back to its original name.)
1	31	1	December 3, 2020		HBO Max
1	31	10	January 21, 2021		HBO Max
1	31	10	April 29, 2021		HBO Max
2	11	10	July 8, 2021		HBO Max
2	11	1	August 19, 2021		HBO Max
3	9		November 25, 2021		HBO Max
4	10		January 20, 2022		HBO Max
5	11		February 3, 2022	April 6, 2023	HBO Max
6	10	9	July 27, 2023		HBO Max
6	10	1	June 13, 2024		HBO Max

== Episodes ==
=== Season 1 (2020–21) ===
No. overall	No. in season	Title	Directed by	Written by	Storyboard by	Music by	Original release date	Cartoon Network air date	Prod. code	U.S. linear viewers (millions)
Season 1A
1	1	"Curse of the Monkeybird"	Peter Browngardt	Eddie Trigueros, Peter Browngardt & Johnny Ryan	Eddie Trigueros	Joshua Moshier	May 27, 2020 (Note: "Curse of the Monkeybird" premiered at Annecy in June 2019. Production started in 2018.)	July 5, 2021	001	0.25
1	1	"Marvin Flag Gag: Deflating Planet"	Kenny Pittenger	Andrew Dickman, Kenny Pittenger, Johnny Ryan & Jacob Fleisher	Andrew Dickman	Joshua Moshier	May 27, 2020	July 5, 2021	115A	0.25
1	1	"Harm Wrestling"	David Gemmill	Ryan Khatam, David Gemmill, Johnny Ryan & Jacob Fleisher	Ryan Khatam	Carl Johnson	May 27, 2020	July 5, 2021	048	0.25
"Curse of the Monkeybird": Daffy Duck and Porky Pig try to find a hidden treasure, but they aren't aware of the "curse of the monkeybird." "Marvin Flag Gag: Deflating Planet": Marvin the Martian accidentally deflates his newly-claimed planet for Mars with a flag. "Harm Wrestling": Yosemite Sam thinks he's the best arm-wrestler in town, but Bugs Bunny gives him a run for his money.
2	2	"Big League Beast"	Kenny Pittenger	Andrew Dickman, Kenny Pittenger, Johnny Ryan & Jacob Fleisher	Andrew Dickman	Joshua Moshier	May 27, 2020	July 5, 2021	072	0.24
2	2	"Hole Gag: Mini Elmer"	David Gemmill	Caroline Director, David Gemmill & Johnny Ryan	Caroline Director	Carl Johnson	May 27, 2020	July 5, 2021	076A	0.24
2	2	"Firehouse Frenzy"	Kenny Pittenger	Andrew Dickman, Kenny Pittenger, Alex Kirwan, Johnny Ryan & Jacob Fleisher	Andrew Dickman	Joshua Moshier	May 27, 2020	July 5, 2021	037	0.24
"Big League Beast": When Bugs Bunny overstays his welcome, Dr. Frankenbeans unleashes Gossamer to get rid of him. "Hole Gag: Mini Elmer": Whilst chasing Bugs Bunny, Elmer Fudd shrinks down to the size of an ant. "Firehouse Frenzy": Daffy Duck and Porky Pig make lousy firefighters.
3	3	"Boo! Appetweet"	Kenny Pittenger	Andrew Dickman, Kenny Pittenger, Johnny Ryan & Jacob Fleisher	Andrew Dickman	Joshua Moshier	May 27, 2020 (Note: This episode was uploaded to Facebook and YouTube on May 23, 2020.)	July 6, 2021	056	0.24
3	3	"Hole Gag: Plunger"	David Gemmill	Caroline Director, David Gemmill & Johnny Ryan	Caroline Director	Carl Johnson	May 27, 2020	July 6, 2021	076B	0.24
3	3	"Bubble Dum"	Kenny Pittenger	Charlotte Jackson, Kenny Pittenger, Johnny Ryan & Jacob Fleisher	Charlotte Jackson	Joshua Moshier	May 27, 2020	July 6, 2021	058	0.24
"Boo! Appetweet": Sweet victory turns into a nightmare when Sylvester fears he's haunted by Tweety's ghost. "Hole Gag: Plunger": Whilst chasing Bugs Bunny, Elmer Fudd uses a plunger to suck him out. "Bubble Dum": Daffy Duck faces off with a pesky piece of gum.
4	4	"Pain in the Ice"	David Gemmill	David Gemmill; Johnny Ryan; Pete Browngardt	David Gemmill	Carl Johnson	May 27, 2020	July 6, 2021	019	0.23
4	4	"Tunnel Vison"	Ryan Kramer	Ryan Kramer; Johnny Ryan	Ryan Kramer	Carl Johnson	May 27, 2020	July 6, 2021	032	0.23
4	4	"Pool Bunny"	Ryan Kramer	Andy Gonsalves; Ryan Kramer; Johnny Ryan	Andy Gonsalves	Carl Johnson	May 27, 2020	July 6, 2021	005	0.23
"Pain in the Ice": A hungry Sylvester sets his sights on Tweety the ice skater. "Tunnel Vision": Wile E. Coyote tries to outsmart Road Runner with his painting skills.: Note: This short was uploaded to YouTube on May 19, 2020.; "Pool Bunny": On a scorching hot day, Bugs Bunny makes himself at home in Elmer Fudd's pool.
5	5	"Pest Coaster"	Ryan Kramer	Ryan Kramer; Pete Browngardt; Johnny Ryan	Ryan Kramer	Carl Johnson	May 27, 2020	July 7, 2021	007	0.18
5	5	"Rhino Ya Don't!"	Ryan Kramer	Ryan Kramer; Pete Browngardt; Johnny Ryan	Ryan Kramer	Carl Johnson	May 27, 2020	July 7, 2021	002	0.18
"Pest Coaster:" Bugs Bunny tries to enjoy a day at the Amusement Park while Yosemite Sam tries to throw him out.: Note: This episode was uploaded to YouTube on May 5, 2020.; "Rhino Ya Don't": At the zoo, Sylvester's lunch plans are foiled by a black rhino.
6	6	"Buzzard School"	David Gemmill; Michael Ruocco	Michael Ruocco; David Gemmill; Johnny Ryan	Michael Ruocco	Joshua Moshier	May 27, 2020	July 7, 2021	027	0.20
6	6	"Marvin Flag Gag: Giant Alien Mouth"	Kenny Pittenger	Andrew Dickman; Kenny Pittenger; Johnny Ryan; Jacob Fleisher	Andrew Dickman	Joshua Moshier	May 27, 2020	July 7, 2021	115B	0.20
6	6	"Wet Cement"	David Gemmill	David Gemmill; Michael Ruocco; Johnny Ryan	Michael Ruocco	Carl Johnson	May 27, 2020	July 7, 2021	050	0.20
"Buzzard School": Bugs Bunny enrolls Beaky Buzzard in Rabbit Hunting 101. "Marvin Flag Gag: Giant Alien Mouth": Marvin the Martian accidentally plants his flag into a planet based creature. "Wet Cement": Daffy Duck wreaks havoc on Porky Pig's wet cement.: Note: This episode was uploaded to YouTube on May 12, 2020.
7	7	"Siberian Sam"	Ryan Kramer	Andy Gonsalves; Ryan Kramer; Johnny Ryan; Jacob Fleisher	Andy Gonsalves	Joshua Moshier	May 27, 2020	July 8, 2021	043	0.29
7	7	"Hole Gag: Fishing Pole"	David Gemmill	Caroline Director; Kenny Pittenger; Johnny Ryan	Caroline Director	Carl Johnson	May 27, 2020	July 8, 2021	076C	0.29
7	7	"Fleece & Desist"	David Gemmill	Michael Ruocco; David Gemmill; Johnny Ryan; Jacob Fleisher	Michael Ruocco	Carl Johnson	May 27, 2020	July 8, 2021	042	0.29
7	7	"Marvin Flag Gag: Split-Screen Marvin"	Kenny Pittenger	Andrew Dickman; Kenny Pittenger; Johnny Ryan; Jacob Fleisher	Andrew Dickman	Joshua Moshier	May 27, 2020	July 8, 2021	115C	0.29
"Siberian Sam": In need of a new hat, Siberian Sam feasts his eyes on Bugs Bunny. "Hole Gag: Fishing Pole": Whilst chasing Bugs Bunny, Elmer Fudd mistakes a fishing pond for his burrow.: Note: This short is mistakenly named "Moving Hole".; "Fleece & Desist": Sam Sheepdog protects his herd from a hungry Ralph Wolf. "Marvin Flag Gag: Split-Screen Marvin": Marvin the Martian accidentally plants his flag where another Marvin has already planted it.
8	8	"Grilled Rabbit"	Kenny Pittenger	Charlotte Jackson; Kenny Pittenger; Johnny Ryan; Jacob Fleisher	Charlotte Jackson	Joshua Moshier	May 27, 2020	July 8, 2021	068	0.27
8	8	"Cactus if You Can"	David Gemmill	Michael Ruocco; David Gemmill	Michael Ruocco	Carl Johnson	May 27, 2020	July 8, 2021	057	0.27
8	8	"Shower Shuffle"	Kenny Pittenger	Charlotte Jackson; Kenny Pittenger; Johnny Ryan; Jacob Fleisher	Charlotte Jackson	Joshua Moshier	May 27, 2020	July 8, 2021	080	0.27
"Grilled Rabbit": Elmer Fudd interrogates Bugs Bunny about a theft. "Cactus if You Can": Wile E. Coyote's plan to catch Road Runner gets prickly. "Shower Shuffle": Daffy Duck and Porky Pig have shower troubles.
9	9	"Overdue Duck"	Ryan Kramer	Mike Pelensky; Ryan Kramer; Johnny Ryan; Jacob Fleisher	Mike Pelensky	Carl Johnson	May 27, 2020	July 9, 2021	065	0.26
9	9	"Hole Gag: Bees"	David Gemmill	Caroline Director; David Gemmill; Johnny Ryan	Caroline Director	Carl Johnson	May 27, 2020	July 9, 2021	076	0.26
9	9	"Vincent Van Fudd"	David Gemmill	Caroline Director; David Gemmill; Johnny Ryan	Caroline Director	Carl Johnson	May 27, 2020	July 9, 2021	029	0.26
"Overdue Duck": At the library, Porky Pig tries to silence a troublemaking Daffy Duck. "Hole Gag: Bees": Whilst chasing Bugs Bunny, Elmer Fudd accidentally runs into a bee's nest. "Vincent Van Fudd": Bugs Bunny interrupts Elmer Fudd's attempt to be a great artist.
10	10	"Hare Restoration"	Kenny Pittenger	Charlotte Jackson; Kenny Pittenger; Johnny Ryan; Jacob Fleisher	Charlotte Jackson	Carl Johnson	May 27, 2020	July 15, 2021	038	0.30
10	10	"TNT Trouble"	David Gemmill	Ryan Khatam; David Gemmill; Alex Kirwan	Ryan Khatam	Joshua Moshier	May 27, 2020	July 15, 2021	036	0.30
10	10	"Plumber's Quack"	Ryan Kramer	Mike Pelensky; Ryan Kramer; Johnny Ryan; Jacob Fleisher	Mike Pelensky	Joshua Moshier	May 27, 2020	July 15, 2021	081	0.30
"Hare Restoration": A self-interested Bugs Bunny gives Elmer Fudd dating advice. "TNT Trouble": Wile E. Coyote runs into some dynamite problems. "Plumber's Quack": Elmer Fudd's leaky sink is no match for Daffy Duck.
11	11	"Daffuccino"	David Gemmill	Caroline Director; David Gemmill; Johnny Ryan; Jacob Fleisher	Caroline Director	Joshua Moshier	January 21, 2021	July 12, 2021	091	0.20
11	11	"Hole Gag: Moving Hole"	David Gemmill	Caroline Director; David Gemmill; Johnny Ryan	Caroline Director	Carl Johnson	January 21, 2021	July 12, 2021	076E	0.20
11	11	"Kitty Livin'"	David Gemmill	Ryan Khatam; David Gemmill; Johnny Ryan; Jacob Fleisher	Ryan Khatan	Joshua Moshier	January 21, 2021	July 12, 2021	054	0.20
"Daffuchino": Before his new coffee shop goes from grand opening to grand closing, Porky Pig must impress an influential customer. "Hole Gag: Moving Hole": Whilst chasing Bugs Bunny, Elmer Fudd comes across a portable hole.: Note: This short was first released in the Bugs Bunny 80th Anniversary Collection.; "Kitty Livin'": Sylvester may have swallowed more than he can chew when he manages to trap Tweety... inside his stomach!
12a	12a	"Chain Gang(sters)"	Ryan Kramer	Andy Gonsalves; Ryan Kramer; Johnny Ryan; Jacob Fleisher	Andy Gonsalves	Carl Johnson	January 21, 2021	July 12, 2021	082	0.21
Rocky and Mugsy need Bugs Bunny's help to break out of jail.
12b	12b	"Telephone Pole Gag: Sylvester Car Jack Lift"	David Gemmill	Caroline Director; David Gemmill; Johnny Ryan; Jacob Fleisher	Caroline Director	Joshua Moshier	January 21, 2021	July 12, 2021	TBA	0.21
Hungering after Tweety, Sylvester cranes his neck like a jacklift to get more closer.
12c	12c	"Falling for It!"	Ryan Kramer	Andy Gonsalves; Ryan Kramer; Johnny Ryan; Jacob Fleisher	Andy Gonsalves	Joshua Moshier	January 21, 2021	July 12, 2021	075	0.21
Daffy Duck convinces Porky Pig to go skydiving but forgets one important little thing...
13a	13a	"Taziator"	David Gemmill	Michael Ruocco; David Gemmill; Johnny Ryan; Jacob Fleisher	Michael Ruocco	Joshua Moshier	January 21, 2021	July 13, 2021	060	0.19
Bugs Bunny faces off against Taz in the Roman colosseum.: Note: This short was screened at Annecy in June 2019.
13b	13b	"Marvin Flag Gag: Little Martian"	Kenny Pittenger	Andrew Dickman; Kenny Pittenger; Johnny Ryan; Jacob Fleisher	Andrew Dickman	Joshua Moshier	January 21, 2021	July 13, 2021	115D	0.19
Marvin the Martian accidentally plants his flag on the home of a seemingly harmless Martian.
13c	13c	"Climate Control"	Ryan Kramer	Andy Gonsalves; Ryan Kramer; Johnny Ryan; Jacob Fleisher	Andy Gonsalves	Carl Johnson	January 21, 2021	July 13, 2021	094	0.19
Wile E. Coyote orders a weather control kit, but his chances of catching Road Runner remain cloudy.
14a	14a	"Lepre Conned"	Kenny Pittenger	Andrew Dickman; Kenny Pittenger; Johnny Ryan; Jacob Fleisher	Andrew Dickman	Joshua Moshier	January 21, 2021	July 13, 2021	022	0.19
Bugs Bunny is looking for Hawaii but finds Ireland and an angry leprechaun instead.
14b	14b	"Marvin Flag Gag: Flag Won't Stay Straight"	Kenny Pittenger	Andrew Dickman; Kenny Pittenger; Johnny Ryan; Jacob Fleisher	Andrew Dickman	Joshua Moshier	January 21, 2021	July 13, 2021	115E	0.19
Marvin the Martian's flag costs the planet its balance when he plants it.
14c	14c	"Brave New Home"	Ryan Kramer	Chris Allison; Ryan Kramer; Johnny Ryan	Chris Allison	Joshua Moshier	January 21, 2021	July 13, 2021	028	0.19
Porky Pig's new home has all the modern amenities anyone could hope for, including a computerized assistant - but the voice recognition software could use an update.
15a	15a	"The Case of Porky's Pants"	Kenny Pittenger	Charlotte Jackson; Kenny Pittenger; Johnny Ryan; Jacob Fleisher	Charlotte Jackson	Joshua Moshier	January 21, 2021	July 14, 2021	009	0.16
Detective Daffy Duck takes on the case of Porky Pig's missing pants.
15b	15b	"Fully Vetted"	Kenny Pittenger	David Shair; Kenny Pittenger; Johnny Ryan; Jacob Fleisher	David Shair	Joshua Moshier	January 21, 2021	July 14, 2021	059	0.16
Tweety's trip to the veterinarian's office gives Sylvester the perfect opportunity for a lunchtime treat.
16a	16a	"Erabbitcator"	Kenny Pittenger	Andrew Dickman; Kenny Pittenger; Johnny Ryan; Jacob Fleisher	Andrew Dickman	Joshua Moshier	January 21, 2021	July 14, 2021	045	0.18
Bugs Bunny must outsmart a new technological foe.
16b	16b	"Marvin Flag Gag: Planet Split in Two"	Kenny Pittenger	Andrew Dickman; Kenny Pittenger; Johnny Ryan; Jacob Fleisher	Andrew Dickman	Joshua Moshier	January 21, 2021	July 14, 2021	115F	0.18
Marvin the Martian accidentally breaks a planet in two by planting his flag.
16c	16c	"Salesduck"	Ryan Kramer	Ryan Kramer; Johnny Ryan; Pete Browngardt	Ryan Kramer	Carl Johnson	January 21, 2021	July 14, 2021	025	0.18
Elmer Fudd is ready for bed, but persistent salesman Daffy Duck stands in the way of a good night's rest.
17a	17a	"Pitcher Porky"	David Gemmill	Michael Ruocco; David Gemmill; Pete Browngardt; Johnny Ryan	Michael Ruocco	Carl Johnson	January 21, 2021	July 15, 2021	006	0.30
Benchwarmer Porky Pig finally gets his chance to shine on the pitching mound. With the game on the line, he needs all the help he can get - even if it's from Daffy Duck.: Note: The short premiered in June of 2019 at Annecy.
17b	17b	"Telephone Pole Gag: Cherry Picker"	David Gemmill	Caroline Director; David Gemmill; Johnny Ryan; Jacob Fleisher	Caroline Director	Joshua Moshier	January 21, 2021	July 15, 2021	TBA	0.30
Hungering after Tweety, Sylvester uses a cherry picker to pluck him out.
17c	17c	"Duck Duck Boom!"	Ryan Kramer	Chris Allison; Ryan Kramer; Johnny Ryan; Jacob Fleisher	Chris Allison	Carl Johnson	January 21, 2021	July 15, 2021	087	0.30
Elmer Fudd sets his sights on Daffy Duck, but who's hunting whom?
18a	18a	"Postalgeist"	David Gemmill	Ryan Khatam; David Gemmill; Johnny Ryan; Alex Kirwan	Ryan Khatam	Joshua Moshier	January 21, 2021	July 9, 2021	016	0.30
Daffy Duck and Porky Pig deliver packages to a haunted manor.: Note: The short premiered at San Diego Comic-Con on July 26, 2020.
18b	18b	"Telephone Pole Gag: Anvil"	David Gemmill	Caroline Director; David Gemmill; Johnny Ryan; Jacob Fleisher	Caroline Director	Joshua Moshier	January 21, 2021	July 9, 2021	TBA	0.30
Hungering after Tweety, Sylvester the Cat has his head damaged by an anvil.
18c	18c	"Fudds Bunny"	Kenny Pittenger	David Shair; Kenny Pittenger; Johnny Ryan; Jacob Fleisher	David Shair	Joshua Moshier	January 21, 2021	July 9, 2021	070	0.30
Elmer Fudd's plan to disguise himself as a bunny to lure Bugs Bunny out of his hole does not quite go as planned.
19a	19a	"Shoe Shine-nanigans"	David Gemmill	Michael Ruocco; David Gemmill; Johnny Ryan; Jacob Fleisher	Michael Ruocco	Carl Johnson	January 21, 2021	July 16, 2021	084	0.15
Elmer Fudd visits Daffy Duck for a quick shoeshine.
19b	19b	"Multiply and Conquer"	Ryan Kramer	Mike Pelensky; Ryan Kramer; Johnny Ryan; Jacob Fleisher	Mike Pelensky	Carl Johnson	January 21, 2021	July 16, 2021	093	0.15
Wile E. Coyote attempts catching Road Runner by cloning himself.
19c	19c	"Parky Pig"	David Gemmill	Caroline Director; David Gemmill; Johnny Ryan; Jacob Fleisher	Caroline Director	Carl Johnson	January 21, 2021	July 16, 2021	049	0.15
Porky Pig is running late for movie night but finding a parking spot is easier said than done.
20a	20a	"Shell Shocked"	Pete Browngardt	Gabe Del Valle; Pete Browngardt; Johnny Ryan; Jacob Fleisher	Gabe Del Valle	Carl Johnson	January 21, 2021	July 16, 2021	033	0.17
Bugs Bunny races against Cecil Turtle for the title of "fastest thing in New York City".
20b	20b	"The Daffy Dentist"	David Gemmill	Caroline Director; David Gemmill; Johnny Ryan; Jacob Fleisher	Caroline Director	Joshua Moshier	January 21, 2021	July 16, 2021	040	0.17
The only thing more painful than Porky Pig's sore tooth is a visit to dentist Daffy Duck.
21	21	"Bugs Bunny's 24-Carrot Holiday Special"	Pete Browngardt	Gabe Del Valle, Pete Browngardt, Johnny Ryan & Jacob Fleisher	Gabe Del Valle	Carl Johnson	December 3, 2020	TBA	034; 119; 126; 131; 136; 095	N/A
21	21	"Bugs Bunny's 24-Carrot Holiday Special"	David Gemmill	Michael Ruocco, David Gemmill, Johnny Ryan & Jacob Fleisher	Michael Ruocco	Carl Johnson	December 3, 2020	TBA	034; 119; 126; 131; 136; 095	N/A
21	21	"Bugs Bunny's 24-Carrot Holiday Special"	Kenny Pittenger	Andrew Dickman, Kenny Pittenger, Johnny Ryan & Jacob Fleisher	Andrew Dickman	Joshua Moshier	December 3, 2020	TBA	034; 119; 126; 131; 136; 095	N/A
21	21	"Bugs Bunny's 24-Carrot Holiday Special"	Ryan Kramer	Chris Allison, Ryan Kramer, Johnny Ryan & Jacob Fleisher	Chris Allison	Joshua Moshier	December 3, 2020	TBA	034; 119; 126; 131; 136; 095	N/A
21	21	"Bugs Bunny's 24-Carrot Holiday Special"	Pete Browngardt	Eddie Trigueros, Johnny Ryan & Jacob Fleisher	Eddie Trigueros	Carl Johnson	December 3, 2020	TBA	034; 119; 126; 131; 136; 095	N/A
Elf Help: Porky Pig and Daffy Duck travel to the North Pole on a mission to save Christmas. Yuletide Taz: Taz goes out carolling from door to door. Holiday Purrchase: Granny and Tweety go hunting for deals and Sylvester hunts for Tweety. Ho Ho Go: Around Christmas, Wile E. Coyote tries to catch Road Runner yet again. Snow Laughing Matter: A snowball fight quickly escalates between feuding neighbors Bugs Bunny and Elmer Fudd.
22a	22a	"Puma Problems"	Kenny Pittenger	David Shair; Kenny Pittenger; Johnny Ryan; Jacob Fleisher	David Shair	Joshua Moshier	April 29, 2021	April 1, 2022	106	0.05
Pete Puma once again tries to trick Bugs Bunny so he can eat him, but continues to be outsmarted.
22b	22b	"Marvin Flag Gag: Bowling Ball"	Kenny Pittenger	Andrew Dickman; Kenny Pittenger; Johnny Ryan; Jacob Fleisher	Andrew Dickman	Joshua Moshier	April 29, 2021	April 1, 2022	115G	0.05
Marvin the Martian accidentally claims a bowling ball for Mars.
22c	22c	"Duplicate Daffy"	Ryan Kramer	Chris Allison; Kenny Pittenger; Johnny Ryan; Jacob Fleisher	Chris Allison	Joshua Moshier	April 29, 2021	April 1, 2022	051	0.05
Daffy Duck meets his match with an office photocopier.
23a	23a	"Key-Tastrophe!"	Ryan Kramer	Andy Gonsalves; Ryan Kramer; Johnny Ryan; Jacob Fleisher	Andy Gonsalves	Carl Johnson	April 29, 2021	April 1, 2022	103	0.05
Daffy Duck helps Porky Pig find his missing car key.
23b	23b	"Hole Gag: Hammer the Rabbit Hole"	David Gemmill	Caroline Director; David Gemmill; Johnny Ryan	Caroline Director	Carl Johnson	April 29, 2021	April 1, 2022	076F	0.05
Elmer Fudd uses a wooder mallet to catch Bugs Bunny.
23c	23c	"Devil of a Drink"	Kenny Pittenger	Andrew Dickman; Kenny Pittenger; Johnny Ryan; Jacob Fleisher	Andrew Dickman	Joshua Moshier	April 29, 2021	April 1, 2022	099	0.05
Taz tries to drink from a geyser, but is repeatedly splashed back by it.
24a	24a	"Weaselin' In!"	Kenny Pittenger	Andrew Dickman; Kenny Pittenger; Johnny Ryan; Jacob Fleisher	Andrew Dickman	Carl Johnson	April 29, 2021	April 3, 2022	092	0.12
Foghorn Leghorn enlists help from a hungry weasel to outsmart Barnyard Dawg.
24b	24b	"Time Out!"	David Gemmill	Ryan Khatam; David Gemmill; Johnny Ryan; Jacob Fleisher	Ryan Khatam	Carl Johnson	April 29, 2021	April 3, 2022	064	0.12
Wile E. Coyote decides to use a freeze ray in order to catch Road Runner.
25a	25a	"Bounty Bunny"	Ryan Kramer	Mike Pelensky; Ryan Kramer; Johnny Ryan; Jacob Fleisher	Mike Pelensky	Joshua Moshier	April 29, 2021	TBA	111	N/A
Yosemite Sam chases a wanted Bugs Bunny to collect a $5,000 bounty on him.
25b	25b	"Hole Gag: Underwear"	David Gemmill	Caroline Director; David Gemmill; Johnny Ryan	Caroline Director	Carl Johnson	April 29, 2021	TBA	076G	N/A
Elmer Fudd tries to catch Bugs Bunny, but ends up losing his pants.
25c	25c	"Vender Bender"	Kenny Pittenger	Andrew Dickman; Kenny Pittenger; Johnny Ryan; Jacob Fleisher	Andrew Dickman	Joshua Moshier	April 29, 2021	TBA	066	N/A
A malfunctioning vending machine sabotages Porky Pig's snacking plans.
26a	26a	"Mallard Practice"	Ryan Kramer	Chris Allison; Ryan Kramer; Johnny Ryan; Jacob Fleisher	Chris Allison	Carl Johnson	April 29, 2021	April 3, 2022	104	0.12
Daffy Duck acts as Elmer Fudd's lawyer in court case over a parking ticket.
26b	26b	"Beaky Buzzard Gags: Mouse"	David Gemmill; Michael Ruocco	Michael Ruocco; David Gemmill; Johnny Ryan; Jacob Fleisher	Michael Ruocco	Carl Johnson	April 29, 2021	April 3, 2022	TBA	0.12
Beaky Buzzard tries to catch a mouse.
26c	26c	"Born to Be Wile E."	David Gemmill	Caroline Director; David Gemmill; Johnny Ryan; Jacob Fleisher	Caroline Director	Carl Johnson	April 29, 2021	April 3, 2022	117	0.12
Wile E. Coyote chases Road Runner using a motorcycle.
27a	27a	"Raging Granny"	Ryan Kramer	Chris Allison; Ryan Kramer; Johnny Ryan	Chris Allison	Joshua Moshier	April 29, 2021	TBA	010	N/A
Sylvester tries to catch Tweety with former boxing champion Granny sleeping nearby.
27b	27b	"Daffy Psychic: Famous"	Ryan Kramer	Chris Allison; Ryan Kramer; Johnny Ryan; Jacob Fleisher	Chris Allison	Joshua Moshier	April 29, 2021	TBA	TBA	N/A
Daffy Duck acts as a psychic for Porky Pig.
27c	27c	"Spare Me!"	Ryan Kramer	Chris Allison; Ryan Kramer; Johnny Ryan; Jacob Fleisher	Chris Allison	Carl Johnson	April 29, 2021	TBA	046	N/A
Daffy Duck and Porky Pig try to change a flat tire in the desert.
28a	28a	"Marv Attacks!"	Ryan Kramer	Andy Gonsalves; Ryan Kramer; Jacob Fleisher; Johnny Ryan	Andy Gonsalves	Joshua Moshier	April 29, 2021	TBA	110	N/A
Bugs Bunny gets involved in Marvin the Martian's invasion of Earth.
28b	28b	"A Wolf in Cheap Clothing"	David Gemmill	Michael Ruocco; David Gemmill; Johnny Ryan; Jacob Fleisher	Michael Ruocco	Joshua Moshier	April 29, 2021	TBA	114	N/A
Ralph Wolf tries to steal a sheep from Sam Sheepdog's flock by using various disguises.
29a	29a	"High Speed Hare"	Pete Browngardt	Kenny Pittenger; Pete Browngardt; Johnny Ryan	Kenny Pittenger	Joshua Moshier	April 29, 2021	TBA	003	N/A
Bugs Bunny goes shopping for a new car, but his test drive is interrupted by a gremlin.
29b	29b	"Beaky Buzzard Gags: Rattle Snake"	David Gemmill; Michael Ruocco	Michael Ruocco; David Gemmill; Johnny Ryan; Jacob Fleisher	Michael Ruocco	Joshua Moshier	April 29, 2021	TBA	TBA	N/A
Beaky Buzzard catches a rattlesnake.
29c	29c	"Nutty Devil"	Ryan Kramer	Andy Gonsalves; Ryan Kramer; Jacob Fleisher; Johnny Ryan	Andy Gonsalves	Joshua Moshier	April 29, 2021	TBA	118	N/A
Taz tries to open a coconut.
30a	30a	"Pigture Perfect"	David Gemmill	Caroline Director; David Gemmill; Johnny Ryan; Jacob Fleisher	Caroline Director	Carl Johnson	April 29, 2021	TBA	074	N/A
Petunia Pig wants a new picture for her fireplace mantle, but her photoshoot goes a little nutty.
30b	30b	"Telephone Pole Gag: Grappling Hook"	David Gemmill	Michael Ruocco; David Gemmill; Johnny Ryan; Jacob Fleisher	Michael Ruocco	Joshua Moshier	April 29, 2021	TBA	153	N/A
Sylvester tries to catch Tweety at the top of a telephone pole with a grappling hook.
30c	30c	"Swoop De Doo!"	David Gemmill	Ryan Khatam; David Gemmill; Johnny Ryan; Jacob Fleisher	Ryan Khatam	Carl Johnson	April 29, 2021	TBA	083	N/A
Wile E. Coyote uses a hawk suit to try to swoop down and catch Road Runner.
31a	31a	"A Pane to Wash"	David Gemmill	Caroline Director; David Gemmill; Johnny Ryan; Jacob Fleisher	Caroline Director	Carl Johnson	April 29, 2021	TBA	102	N/A
Porky Pig and Daffy Duck wash the windows of a sky-high building.
31b	31b	"Telephone Pole Gag: High Wire"	David Gemmill	Michael Ruocco; David Gemmill; Johnny Ryan; Jacob Fleisher	Michael Ruocco	Joshua Moshier	April 29, 2021	TBA	TBA	N/A
Sylvester tries to catch Tweety at the top of a telephone pole by walking across its wires.
31c	31c	"Saddle Sore!"	Ryan Kramer	Chris Allison; Ryan Kramer; Johnny Ryan; Jacob Fleisher	Chris Allison	Carl Johnson	April 29, 2021	TBA	079	N/A
Yosemite Sam attempts to saddle and tame a wild horse.

=== Season 2 (2021) ===
No. overall	No. in season	Title	Directed by	Written by	Storyboarded by	Music by	Original release date	Cartoon Network air date	Prod. code	U.S. linear viewers (millions)
32a	1a	"Red White and Bruised"	Ryan Kramer	Mike Pelensky; Ryan Kramer; Johnny Ryan; Jacob Fleisher	Mike Pelensky	Joshua Moshier	July 8, 2021	April 1, 2023	098	0.20
Tweety builds a nest inside a military base to keep safe from Sylvester.
32b	1b	"Beaky Buzzard Gags: Bunny"	David Gemmill; Michael Ruocco	Michael Ruocco; David Gemmill; Johnny Ryan; Jacob Fleisher	Michael Ruocco	Joshua Moshier	July 8, 2021	April 1, 2023	TBA	0.20
Beaky Buzzard catches a little bunny.
32c	1c	"Jet Porkpelled"	Ryan Kramer	Mike Pelensky; Ryan Kramer; Johnny Ryan; Jacob Fleisher	Mike Pelensky	Carl Johnson	July 8, 2021	April 1, 2023	120	0.20
Porky Pig tries Daffy Duck's new jet pack.
33a	2a	"Mummy Dummy"	David Gemmill	Michael Ruocco; David Gemmill; Johnny Ryan; Pete Browngardt	Michael Ruocco	Joshua Moshier	July 8, 2021	April 1, 2023	013	0.20
Bugs Bunny meets a very old, very cranky mummy.: Note: This short originally screened at Annecy in June 2019.
33b	2b	"Telephone Pole Gag: Shrinking Telephone Pole"	David Gemmill	Michael Ruocco; David Gemmill; Johnny Ryan; Jacob Fleisher	Michael Ruocco	Joshua Moshier	July 8, 2021	April 1, 2023	TBA	0.20
Sylvester tries to catch Tweety climbing a shrinking telephone pole.
33c	2c	"In the Road Again!"	Kenny Pittenger	Andrew Dickman; Kenny Pittenger; Johnny Ryan; Jacob Fleisher	Andrew Dickman	Carl Johnson	July 8, 2021	April 1, 2023	152	0.20
After failing to capture Road Runner, Wile E. Coyote gets stuck in the asphalt.
34a	3a	"Emotional Support Duck"	Ryan Kramer	Chris Allison; Ryan Kramer; Johnny Ryan; Jacob Fleisher	Chris Allison	Carl Johnson	July 8, 2021	April 8, 2023	113	0.14
Porky Pig pretends Daffy Duck is his emotional support duck.
34b	3b	"End of the Leash Gags: Tennis"	Ryan Kramer	Chris Allison; Ryan Kramer; Johnny Ryan; Jacob Fleisher	Chris Allison	Carl Johnson	July 8, 2021	April 8, 2023	151A	0.14
Foghorn Leghorn plays a painful game of tennis with Barnyard Dawg.
34c	3c	"Adopt Me!"	Ryan Kramer	Mike Pelensky; Ryan Kramer; Alex Kirwan; Johnny Ryan; Jacob Fleisher	Mike Pelensky	Carl Johnson	July 8, 2021	April 8, 2023	187	0.14
Charlie Dog lets everyone know he's the greatest dog ever.
35a	4a	"Rage Rover"	David Gemmill	Michael Ruocco; David Gemmill; Johnny Ryan; Jacob Fleisher	Michael Ruocco	Joshua Moshier	July 8, 2021	April 8, 2023	100	0.14
Marvin the Martian tries to destroy NASA's Mars Rover so that it doesn't find out about his plans to blow up Earth so his plants can get more sunlight.
35b	4b	"To Hive and to Hold"	Ryan Kramer	Mike Pelensky; Ryan Kramer; Johnny Ryan; Jacob Fleisher	Mike Pelensky	Joshua Moshier	July 8, 2021	April 8, 2023	077	0.14
Taz learns about bees...the hard way.
35c	4c	"Battle Stations"	Ryan Kramer	Chris Allison; Ryan Kramer; Johnny Ryan; Jacob Fleisher	Chris Allison	Joshua Moshier	July 8, 2021	April 8, 2023	133	0.14
While on a road trip, Porky Pig and Daffy Duck can't agree on a radio station.
36a	5a	"Bonehead"	Pete Browngardt	Gabe Del Valle; Pete Browngardt; Johnny Ryan; Jacob Fleisher	Gabe Del Valle	Joshua Moshier	July 8, 2021	April 15, 2023	088	0.18
A dog uncovers trouble when he buries a bone in Bugs Bunny's hole.
36b	5b	"Relax!"	Ryan Kramer	Andy Gonsalves; Ryan Kramer; Johnny Ryan; Jacob Fleisher	Andy Gonsalves	Joshua Moshier	July 8, 2021	April 15, 2023	055	0.18
Porky Pig's relaxing afternoon is interrupted by his nephew Cicero.
37a	6a	"Rotund Rabbit"	Kenny Pittenger	David Shair; Kenny Pittenger; Johnny Ryan; Jacob Fleisher	David Shair	Carl Johnson	July 8, 2021	April 15, 2023	096	0.18
After Elmer Fudd tricks Bugs Bunny into stuffing himself with carrots, a big and round Bugs rolls over Elmer.: Note: This is the first Looney Tunes Cartoons short to have Elmer Fudd possess his signature double-barrel shotgun, due to the series' firearm ban.
37b	6b	"Hog Wash"	Kenny Pittenger	Charlotte Jackson; Kenny Pittenger; Johnny Ryan; Jacob Fleisher	Charlotte Jackson	Joshua Moshier	July 8, 2021	April 15, 2023	122	0.18
Porky Pig gets locked out of his car while inside an automated car wash while Daffy Duck, who was sleeping when he arrived, mistakes the car wash for a drive-in theater.
38a	7a	"Nip and Duck"	David Gemmill	Caroline Director; David Gemmill; Johnny Ryan; Jacob Fleisher	Caroline Director	Joshua Moshier	July 8, 2021	April 22, 2023	061	0.12
Elmer Fudd goes to the tailor's to get his buttons fixed, but unfortunately, Daffy Duck is his tailor.
38b	7b	"Telephone Pole Gag: Circular Fan"	David Gemmill	Michael Ruocco; David Gemmill; Johnny Ryan; Jacob Fleisher	Michael Ruocco	Joshua Moshier	July 8, 2021	April 22, 2023	TBA	0.12
Sylvester tries to catch Tweety with a circular fan.
38c	7c	"Asphalt and Battery"	Kenny Pittenger	David Shair; Kenny Pittenger; Johnny Ryan; Jacob Fleisher	David Shair	Carl Johnson	July 8, 2021	April 22, 2023	116	0.12
Wile E. Coyote uses a machine that has the ability to make roads in order to capture Road Runner.
39a	8a	"Battle of the Bunk"	Kenny Pittenger	Gabe Del Valle; Kenny Pittenger; Johnny Ryan; Jacob Fleisher	Gabe Del Valle	Carl Johnson	July 8, 2021	April 22, 2023	160	0.12
Porky Pig and Daffy Duck fight over who gets the top bunk.
39b	8b	"End of the Leash Gag: Pull the Carpet Out"	Ryan Kramer	Chris Allison; Ryan Kramer; Johnny Ryan; Jacob Fleisher	Chris Allison	Carl Johnson	July 8, 2021	April 22, 2023	151B	0.12
Foghorn Leghorn keeps Barnyard Dawg out of reach.
39c	8c	"Hot Air Buffoon"	Kenny Pittenger	David Shair; Kenny Pittenger; Johnny Ryan; Jacob Fleisher	David Shair	Joshua Moshier	July 8, 2021	April 22, 2023	078	0.12
Sylvester chases Tweety during a ride in a hot air balloon.
40a	9a	"Basket Bugs"	David Gemmill	Pete Browngardt; David Gemmill; Johnny Ryan	David Gemmill	Joshua Moshier	July 8, 2021	May 6, 2023	004	0.12
Bugs Bunny challenges a bully to a basketball game.: Note: This short was screened at Annecy in June 2019.
40b	9b	"A Skate of Confusion!"	Ryan Kramer	Mike Pelensky; Ryan Kramer; Johnny Ryan; Jacob Fleisher	Mike Pelensky	Carl Johnson	July 8, 2021	May 6, 2023	105	0.12
Cicero trades Porky Pig's skates for a pair of chainsaws.
41a	10a	"Mt. Neverest"	Ryan Kramer	Chris Allison; Ryan Kramer; Johnny Ryan; Jacob Fleisher	Chris Allison	Carl Johnson	July 8, 2021	April 1, 2022	069	0.20
Porky Pig and Daffy Duck climb a mountain.
41b	10b	"Telephone Pole Gag: Zip Line"	David Gemmill	Michael Ruocco; David Gemmill; Johnny Ryan; Jacob Fleisher	Michael Ruocco	Joshua Moshier	July 8, 2021	April 1, 2022	TBA	0.20
Sylvester tries to catch Tweety via zip line.
41c	10c	"Fast & Steady"	David Gemmill	Ryan Khatam; David Gemmill	Ryan Khatam	Carl Johnson	July 8, 2021	April 1, 2022	035	0.20
While chasing Road Runner, Wile E. Coyote sees a sign and decides to use it to his advantage.
42	11	"Looney Tunes Cartoons Back to School Special"	Ryan Kramer; David Gemmill; Michael Ruocco	Mike Pelensky; Chris Allison; Ryan Kramer; David Gemmill; Michael Ruocco; Johnny Ryan; Jacob Fleisher	Mike Pelensky; Chris Allison; Michael Ruocco	Carl Johnson; Joshua Moshier	August 19, 2021	September 2, 2023	193; 151C; 027	0.15
Test Pest: Porky Pig is ready for the test for Clown College since he studied, but Daffy Duck, who is also taking the test but didn't study, will stop at nothing to get answers out of him. Erase the Leash: Foghorn Leghorn tricks Barnyard Dawg for the 76th time, but by borrowing a pencil, he's got a trick up his sleeve. Buzzard School: Repeat of a short that was released during the first season.: Note: This is the first time a segment is repackaged, specifically the segment "Buzzard School", which was released in the first season.

=== Season 3 (2021) ===
No. overall	No. in season	Title	Directed by	Written by	Storyboarded by	Music by	Original release date	Cartoon Network air date	Prod. code	U.S. linear viewers (millions)
43	1	"Sam-merica"	Ryan Kramer	Andy Gonsalves; Ryan Kramer; Johnny Ryan; Jacob Fleisher	Andy Gonsalves	Joshua Moshier	November 25, 2021	May 13, 2023	062	0.15
43	1	"Put the Cat Out: Door Spin"	Ryan Kramer	Mike Pelensky; Ryan Kramer; Johnny Ryan; Jacob Fleisher	Mike Pelensky	Carl Johnson	November 25, 2021	May 13, 2023	TBA	0.15
43	1	"BBQ Bandit"	Kenny Pittinger	David Shair; Kenny Pittenger; Johnny Ryan; Jacob Fleisher	David Shair	Joshua Moshier	November 25, 2021	May 13, 2023	162	0.15
Yosemite Sam, here named Conquistador Sam, a'la Christopher Columbus, discovers a land that he claims as Sam-merica, but Bugs Bunny, who has lived on the island for 20 years, has some tricks for ol' Sam. When Porky Pig puts Sylvester out for the night, Sylvester tries to get back in by flipping the front door. Daffy Duck keeps eating all of Elmer Fudd's food from his grill.
44	2	"Happy Birdy to You"	David Gemmill	Ryan Khatam; David Gemmill; Johnny Ryan; Jacob Fleisher	Ryan Khatam	Carl Johnson	November 25, 2021	May 13, 2023	041	0.15
44	2	"Daffy Psychic: New Love"	Ryan Kramer	Chris Allison; Ryan Kramer; Johnny Ryan; Jacob Fleisher	Chris Allison	Joshua Moshier	November 25, 2021	May 13, 2023	TBA	0.15
44	2	"Spring Forward, Fall Flat"	David Gemmill	Caroline Director; David Gemmill; Johnny Ryan; Jacob Fleisher	Caroline Director	Carl Johnson	November 25, 2021	May 13, 2023	024	0.15
Sylvester plans to capture Tweety during the little bird's birthday party.: Note: This is the first short outsourced to Yearim Productions since Raging Granny and was released four days after the 79th anniversary of Tweety's debut short A Tale of Two Kitties. Porky Pig asks Daffy Duck is there someone out there who loves him. Wile E. Coyote puts a spring in his step in order to catch Road Runner.
45	3	"Frame the Feline"	Kenny Pittenger	Andrew Dickman; Kenny Pittenger; Johnny Ryan; Jacob Fleisher	Andrew Dickman	Carl Johnson	November 25, 2021	May 20, 2023	107	0.14
45	3	"Daffy Traffic Cop Stop: Boating License"	David Gemmill	Ryan Khatam; David Gemmill; Johnny Ryan; Jacob Fleisher	Ryan Khatam	Joshua Moshier	November 25, 2021	May 20, 2023	TBA	0.14
45	3	"Unlucky Strikes"	David Gemmill	Caroline Director; David Gemmill; Johnny Ryan; Jacob Fleisher	Caroline Director	Joshua Moshier	November 25, 2021	May 20, 2023	158	0.14
In order to get cheese from a cheese shop, Hubie and Bertie keep trying to ruin Claude Cat's job in guarding the shop.: Note: This is the first short starring Hubie and Bertie. Porky Pig, working as officer, asks Daffy Duck to see his license, but instead he shows him his boating license, which is actually driving a boat. Porky Pig teaches Cicero Pig how to bowl, but the naughty little prankster makes it more "fun".
46	4	"Cro-Mag Numb Skulls"	Kenny Pittenger	Gabe de Valle; Kenny Pittenger; Johnny Ryan; Jacob Fleisher	Gabe de Valle	Carl Johnson	November 25, 2021	May 20, 2023	145	0.14
46	4	"Trophy Hunter"	Ryan Kramer	Andy Gonsalves; Ryan Kramer; Johnny Ryan; Jacob Fleisher	Andy Gonsalves; Ryan Kramer; Johnny Ryan; Jacob Fleisher	Joshua Moshier	November 25, 2021	May 20, 2023	144	0.14
In 1,000,000 B.C., Daffy Duck and Porky Pig go searching for a dinosaur to eat after Daffy gets tired of eating rocks. Bugs Bunny tells that Elmer Fudd that he has won an award for catching his first rabbit.: Note: This is the first and only short to have a Blue Ribbon title.
47	5	"Bathy Daffy"	Kenny Pittenger	Kenny Pittenger; Johnny Ryan	Kenny Pittenger	Carl Johnson	November 25, 2021	June 3, 2023	031	0.11
47	5	"End of the Leash: Bullseye Painting"	Ryan Kramer	Chris Allison; Ryan Kramer; Johnny Ryan; Jacob Fleisher	Chris Allison	Carl Johnson	November 25, 2021	June 3, 2023	151D	0.11
47	5	"Rabbit Sandwich Maker"	Kenny Pittenger	Ryan Kramer	Chris Allison	Carl Johnson	November 25, 2021	June 3, 2023	044	0.11
47	5	"Put the Cat Out: Window"	Ryan Kramer	Mike Pelensky; Ryan Kramer; Johnny Ryan; Jacob Fleisher	Mike Pelensky	Carl Johnson	November 25, 2021	June 3, 2023	TBA	0.11
Porky Pig tries to make Daffy Duck take a bath in order to get their rent paid and enter a beauty contest for ducks. Barnyard Dawg paints a target on a canvas and when Foghorn Leghorn holds it to see what it is, he holds a cannon and fires it at his stomach. Elmer Fudd creates a new machine that fries and makes rabbits sandwiches. When Porky Pig puts Sylvester out for the night, he tries to get back in by going through the window.
48	6	"Pardon the Garden"	David Gemmill	Caroline Director; David Gemmill; Johnny Ryan; Jacob Fleisher	Caroline Director	Carl Johnson	November 25, 2021	June 3, 2023	165	0.11
48	6	"Put the Cat Out: Flat on the Door"	Ryan Kramer	Mike Pelensky; Ryan Kramer; Johnny Ryan; Jacob Fleisher	Mike Pelensky	Carl Johnson	November 25, 2021	June 3, 2023	TBA	0.11
48	6	"Downward Duck"	Ryan Kramer	Mike Pelensky; Ryan Kramer; Johnny Ryan; Jacob Fleisher; Alex Kirwan	Mike Pelensky	Carl Johnson	November 25, 2021	June 3, 2023	047	0.11
Petunia Pig is dedicated to gardening to help in her neighbor's yard. When Porky Pig puts Sylvester out for the night, he gets back in by putting himself on the outside of the door. Porky Pig takes a yoga lesson from his instructor, Daffy Duck.
49	7	"Lesson Plan 9 from Outer Space"	Kenny Pittenger	Andrew Dickman; Kenny Pittenger; Johnny Ryan; Jacob Fleisher	Andrew Dickman	Joshua Moshier	November 25, 2021	June 10, 2023	161	0.09
49	7	"Balloon Salesman: Baboon"	Ryan Kramer	Stephen Herczeg; Ryan Kramer; Johnny Ryan; Jacob Fleisher	Stephen Herczeg	Carl Johnson	November 25, 2021	June 10, 2023	TBA	0.09
49	7	"Portal Kombat"	David Gemmill	Michael Ruocco; David Gemmill; Johnny Ryan; Jacob Fleisher	Michael Ruocco	Carl Johnson	November 25, 2021	June 10, 2023	TBA	0.09
Marvin the Martian tries to learn more about earth creatures and uses Bugs Bunny as his test subject. Daffy Duck becomes a balloon salesman, who also is a baboon salesman. Wile E. Coyote buys a teleportation kit to catch Road Runner.
50	8	"Virtual Mortality"	David Gemmill	Ryan Khatam; David Gemmill; Johnny Ryan; Jacob Fleisher	Ryan Khatam	Carl Johnson	November 25, 2021	June 10, 2023	020	0.09
50	8	"Daffy Traffic Cop Stop: Lions"	David Gemmill	Ryan Khatam; David Gemmill; Johnny Ryan; Jacob Fleisher	Ryan Khatam	Joshua Moshier	November 25, 2021	June 10, 2023	TBA	0.09
50	8	"Miner Threat"	David Gemmill	Caroline Director; David Gemmill; Johnny Ryan; Jacob Fleisher	N/A	Joshua Moshier	November 25, 2021	June 10, 2023	146	0.09
Bugs Bunny tricks Elmer Fudd to catching him by using a fake virtual reality set. When Officer Porky Pig asks Daffy Duck about having a permit to delivering giraffes, he says that has a permit to deliver lions. Sylvester tries to catch Tweety in a coal mine, but the little bird is guarded by a miner.
51	9	"Fowl Ploy"	Kenny Pittenger	David Shair; Kenny Pittenger; Johnny Ryan; Jacob Fleisher	David Shair	Carl Johnson	November 25, 2021	June 17, 2023	149	0.14
51	9	"Sword Loser"	Ryan Kramer	Chris Allison; Ryan Kramer; Johnny Ryan; Jacob Fleisher	Chris Allison	Carl Johnson	November 25, 2021	June 17, 2023	143	0.14
When Daffy Duck makes up a person named Uncle Rufus to Elmer Fudd saying that he will get $1,000,000 if he takes care of the duck well, he takes advantage of him. Yosemite Sam, here named Sir Samuel of Yosemite, uses Bugs Bunny to pull a sword out of a rock, in order to become king.

=== Season 4 (2022) ===
No. overall	No. in season	Title	Directed by	Written by	Storyboarded by	Music by	Original release date	Cartoon Network air date	Prod. code	U.S. linear viewers (millions)
52a	1a	"Ringmaster Disaster"	Ryan Kramer	Stephen Herczeg; Ryan Kramer; Johnny Ryan; Jacob Fleisher	Stephen Herczeg	Carl Johnson	January 20, 2022	June 17, 2023	176	0.14
Yosemite Sam, here named Circus Sam, butts heads with Bugs Bunny after he plants his circus tent pole inside Bugs' hole.
52b	1b	"Put the Cat Out: Eyeball"	Ryan Kramer	Mike Pelensky; Ryan Kramer; Johnny Ryan; Jacob Fleisher	Mike Pelensky	Carl Johnson	January 20, 2022	June 17, 2023	TBA	0.14
Sylvester gets back into Porky Pig's house by pulling his eyeball through the peephole.
52c	1c	"The Pain Event"	Kenny Pittenger	Andrew Dickman; Kenny Pittenger; Johnny Ryan; Jacob Fleisher	Andrew Dickman	Joshua Moshier	January 20, 2022	June 17, 2023	185	0.14
Daffy Duck keeps encouraging Porky Pig to defeat the champ in a boxing match.
53a	2a	"Drum Schtick!"	Ryan Kramer	Mike Pelensky; Ryan Kramer; Johnny Ryan; Jacob Fleisher	Mike Pelensky	Carl Johnson	January 20, 2022	June 24, 2023	155	0.08
Daffy Duck ruins Elmer Fudd's quiet camping trip by playing his drums.
53b	2b	"Bugs Hole Gags 2: Frisbee"	David Gemmill	Ryan Khatam; David Gemmill; Johnny Ryan; Jacob Fleisher	Ryan Khatam	Carl Johnson	January 20, 2022	June 24, 2023	157A	0.08
Whilst chasing Bugs Bunny, Elmer Fudd falls into the hole and Bugs uses it as a frisbee.
53c	2c	"Beast A-Birdin'"	Ryan Kramer	Mike Pelensky; Ryan Kramer; Johnny Ryan; Jacob Fleisher	Mike Pelensky	Joshua Moshier	January 20, 2022	June 24, 2023	178	0.08
Sylvester thinks he's stumbled upon an all-you-can-eat bird buffet during his visit in a bird aviary.
54a	3a	"Blunder Arrest"	Ryan Kramer	Chris Allison; Ryan Kramer; Johnny Ryan; Jacob Fleisher	Chris Allison	Joshua Moshier	January 20, 2022	June 24, 2023	124	0.08
Elmer Fudd tries to catch Bugs Bunny by disguising himself as a cop, but is forced to help to save his "baby" (who is actually Bugs in disguise).
54b	3b	"Telephone Pole Gag: Airplane Stairs"	David Gemmill	Caroline Director; David Gemmill; Johnny Ryan; Jacob Fleisher	Caroline Director	Joshua Moshier	January 20, 2022	June 24, 2023	TBA	0.08
Sylvester tries to catch Tweety at the top of a telephone pole with airplane stairs.
54c	3c	"Cymbal Minded"	Kenny Pittenger	David Shair; Kenny Pittenger; Johnny Ryan; Jacob Fleisher	David Shair	Carl Johnson	January 20, 2022	June 24, 2023	052	0.08
At the symphony, Daffy Duck tries to not miss his cue to play the cymbal.
55a	4a	"Hook Line and Stinker!"	David Gemmill	Ryan Khatam; David Gemmill; Johnny Ryan; Jacob Fleisher	Ryan Khatam	Joshua Moshier	January 20, 2022	July 1, 2023	148	N/A
Yosemite Sam, here named Fisherman Sam, wants to catch a shark, but Bugs Bunny gets in the way.
55b	4b	"Balloon Salesman: Everything Pops"	Ryan Kramer	Stephen Herczeg; Ryan Kramer; Johnny Ryan; Jacob Fleisher	Stephen Herczeg	Carl Johnson	January 20, 2022	July 1, 2023	TBA	N/A
When Porky Pig touches Daffy Duck when he asked for a balloon, he pops and so does everything.
55c	4c	"Don't Treadmill on Me"	Ryan Kramer	Chris Allison; Ryan Kramer; Johnny Ryan	Chris Allison	Carl Johnson	January 20, 2022	July 1, 2023	021	N/A
Daffy Duck tries out Porky Pig's new treadmill.
56a	5a	"Stained by Me"	David Gemmill	Michael Ruocco; David Gemmill; Johnny Ryan; Jacob Fleisher	Michael Ruocco	Carl Johnson	January 20, 2022	July 1, 2023	140	N/A
Daffy Duck tries to wash Porky Pig's coat after he spills it with chocolate ice cream.
56b	5b	"Pilgwim's Pwogwess"	Ryan Kramer	Mike Pelensky; Ryan Kramer; Johnny Ryan	Mike Pelensky	Carl Johnson	January 20, 2022	July 1, 2023	015	N/A
Bugs Bunny helps Pilgrim Elmer Fudd catch a turkey, but it's really revenge when he decides to catch a rabbit instead of a turkey.
57a	6a	"Hideout Hare"	Ryan Kramer	Andy Gonsalves; Ryan Kramer; Johnny Ryan; Jacob Fleisher	Andy Gonsalves	Carl Johnson	January 20, 2022	July 8, 2023	180	0.16
The gangsters Rocky and Mugsy hideout in Bugs Bunny's rabbit hole.
57b	6b	"Daffy Magician: An Ordinary Mop"	David Gemmill	Michael Ruocco; David Gemmill; Johnny Ryan; Jacob Fleisher	Michael Ruocco	Carl Johnson	January 20, 2022	July 8, 2023	177A	0.16
Daffy Duck asks Porky Pig to be his assistant for his so-called magic trick, but apparently, he wants him to mop the stage.
58a	7a	"Booby Prize"	Ryan Kramer	Mike Pelensky; Ryan Kramer; Johnny Ryan; Jacob Fleisher	Mike Pelensky	Joshua Moshier	January 20, 2022	July 8, 2023	147	0.16
Daffy Duck wants to be watched during Elmer Fudd's birdwatching session.
58b	7b	"End of the Leash Gags: Pea Shooter"	Ryan Kramer	Chris Allison; Ryan Kramer; Johnny Ryan; Jacob Fleisher	Chris Allison	Carl Johnson	January 20, 2022	July 8, 2023	151E	0.16
Barnyard Dawg uses a pea shooter to get the best of Foghorn Leghorn.
58c	7c	"Balloon Salesman: Porky's Head"	Ryan Kramer	Stephen Herczeg; Ryan Kramer; Johnny Ryan; Jacob Fleisher	Stephen Herczeg	Carl Johnson	January 20, 2022	July 8, 2023	TBA	0.16
Daffy Duck decides to make Porky Pig's head a balloon.
59a	8a	"Grand Canyon Canary"	David Gemmill	Michael Ruocco; David Gemmill; Johnny Ryan; Jacob Fleisher	Michael Ruocco	Joshua Moshier	January 20, 2022	July 15, 2023	159	0.16
Sylvester tries to catch Tweety during his vacation with Granny at the Grand Canyon.
59b	8b	"Hole in Dumb"	Kenny Pittenger	David Shair; Kenny Pittenger; Johnny Ryan	David Shair	Joshua Moshier	January 20, 2022	July 15, 2023	039	0.10
Daffy Duck becomes Elmer Fudd's caddy as he attempts to win the golf championships.
60a	9a	"Funeral for a Fudd"	Kenny Pittenger	Charlotte Jackson; Kenny Pittenger; Johnny Ryan; Jacob Fleisher	Charlotte Jackson	Joshua Moshier	January 20, 2022	July 15, 2023	132	0.10
After Bugs Bunny finds out that Elmer Fudd fakes his own death, Bugs puts on a fake funeral.
60b	9b	"Love Goat"	Ryan Kramer	Mike Pelensky; Ryan Kramer; Johnny Ryan; Jacob Fleisher	Mike Pelensky	Joshua Moshier	January 20, 2022	July 15, 2023	172	0.10
When Daffy Duck's pet goat eats Porky Pig's wedding ring for Petunia Pig, he attempts to get it back.
61a	10a	"Practical Jerk!"	Kenny Pittenger	Gabe Del Valle; Kenny Pittenger; Johnny Ryan; Jacob Fleisher	Gabe Del Valle	Carl Johnson	January 20, 2022	April 1, 2022	026	0.20
Daffy Duck plays one too many pranks on Porky Pig during April Fools and makes Porky kick the bucket.
61b	10b	"Bottoms Up"	Kenny Pittenger	David Shair; Kenny Pittenger; Johnny Ryan	David Shair	Carl Johnson	January 20, 2022	April 1, 2022	127	0.20
Bugs Bunny tricks Pete Puma into eating his tail, thinking it's a rabbit.

=== Season 5 (2022–23) ===
No. overall	No. in season	Title	Directed by	Written by	Storyboarded by	Music by	Original release date	Cartoon Network air date	Prod. code	Viewers (millions)
62	1	"Looney Tunes Cartoons Valentine's Extwavaganza!"	Kenny Pittenger; David Gemmill	Andrew Dickman; Kenny Pittenger; Ryan Khatam; David Gemmill; Alex Kirwan; Johnny Ryan; Jacob Fleisher	Andrew Dickman; Ryan Khatam	Carl Johnson; Joshua Moshier	February 3, 2022	TBA	179; 142	N/A
Duck Chocolate: Daffy Duck eats Porky Pig's chocolate box for Petunia Pig. Traffic Cop Stop: Lead Foot: Daffy Duck gets pulled over by Officer Porky Pig for speeding. Bunny and the Beast: A giant female gorilla falls in love with Bugs Bunny.
63	2	"Bugs Bunny's Howl-O-Skreem Spooktacula"	Ryan Kramer; David Gemmill	Andy Gonsalves; Ryan Kramer; Michael Ruocco; David Gemmill; Alex Kirwan; Johnny Ryan; Jacob Fleisher; Pete Browngardt	Andy Gonsalves; Michael Ruocco	Carl Johnson; Joshua Moshier	September 29, 2022	TBA	128; 073; 207; 013	N/A
Graveyard Goofs: Daffy Duck and Porky Pig take a dear friend to a final resting place. Hex Appeal: Witch Hazel chases down an ingredient for her spell. Inn For Trouble: Porky Pig and Sylvester find a suspicious motel. Mummy Dummy: Repeat of a short that was released during the second season.: Notes: Hex Appeal was previewed during the Looney Tunes Cartoons San Diego Comic Con Panel on July 22, 2022. It is also the first short starring Witch Hazel. The segment Mummy Dummy, which was released in the second season, was repackaged on this special.
64a	3a	"Skyscraper Scrap"	David Gemmill	Mike Ruocco; David Gemmill; Johnny Ryan; Jacob Fleisher	Mike Ruocco	Carl Johnson	April 6, 2023	July 29, 2023	141	0.13
Sylvester tries to capture Tweety in a dangerous skyscraper setting.
64b	3b	"Balloon Salesman: Feeling Down"	Ryan Kramer	Stephen Herczeg; Ryan Kramer; Johnny Ryan; Jacob Fleisher	Stephen Herczeg	Carl Johnson	April 6, 2023	July 29, 2023	TBA	0.13
Porky Pig is feeling down, so Daffy Duck the balloon salesman lends him some balloons to lift his spirits.
64c	3c	"The Devil and the Deep Blue Sea"	David Gemmill	Ryan Khantam; David Gemmill; Johnny Ryan; Jacob Fleisher	Ryan Khantam	Joshua Moshier	April 6, 2023	July 29, 2023	197	0.13
Bugs Bunny has to protect himself from a meat-hungry Taz when he's the only one left on a cargo ship.
65a	4a	"Crumb and Get It"	Pete Browngardt	Aaron Springer; Pete Browngardt	Aaron Springer	Joshua Moshier	April 6, 2023	August 5, 2023	TBA	0.08
Daffy Duck and Porky Pig both give out bread crumbs to little yellow chicks in an homage to the late '60s cartoons from the Warner Bros.-Seven Arts era, utilizing an art style created by Aaron Springer.
65b	4b	"Bugs Hole Gags 2: Mini Bugs"	David Gemmill	Ryan Khatam; David Gemmill; Johnny Ryan; Jacob Fleisher	Ryan Khatam	Carl Johnson	April 6, 2023	August 5, 2023	157B	0.08
Elmer Fudd lands on Bugs Bunny's hole while hunting for him, causing it to split into a bunch of different holes.
65c	4c	"Construction Obstruction"	David Gemmill	Caroline Director; David Gemmill; Johnny Ryan; Jacob Fleisher	Caroline Director	Joshua Moshier	April 6, 2023	August 5, 2023	011	0.08
Elmer Fudd plans to build his dream condo on top of Bugs Bunny's hole.
66a	5a	"Yosemite Samurai"	Kenny Pittenger	Andrew Dickman; Kenny Pittenger; Johnny Ryan; Jacob Fleisher	Andrew Dickman	Joshua Moshier	April 6, 2023	August 12, 2023	139	0.13
Yosemite Sam, as a samurai, butts heads with Bugs Bunny when the latter is caught stealing vegetables from the Shogun's garden.
66b	5b	"Bugs Hole Gags 2: Bees Nest"	David Gemmill	Ryan Khatam; David Gemmill; Johnny Ryan; Jacob Fleisher	Ryan Khatam	Carl Johnson	April 6, 2023	August 12, 2023	157C	0.13
Elmer Fudd once again lands on Bugs Bunny's hole, creating a hole inside of the hunter.
66c	5c	"Dummies in the Dark"	Ryan Kramer	Stephen Herczeg; Ryan Kramer; Johnny Ryan; Jacob Fleisher	Stephen Herczeg	Carl Johnson	April 6, 2023	August 12, 2023	012	0.13
When the power is out, Daffy Duck and Porky Pig have to search for the fuse box in the dark.
67a	6a	"Pain Rent"	David Gemmill	Mike Ruocco; David Gemmill; Johnny Ryan; Jacob Fleisher	Mike Ruocco	Carl Johnson	April 6, 2023	August 12, 2023	167	0.13
Gossamer is tasked to find a test subject for his master's latest project, so he goes out into the forest to find an animal. He runs into Bugs Bunny, but Bugs thinks that the monster is his new roommate when he rents out his bedroom.
67b	6b	"Nest Effort"	Ryan Kramer	Mike Pelensky; Ryan Kramer; Johnny Ryan; Jacob Fleisher	Mike Pelensky	Joshua Moshier	April 6, 2023	August 12, 2023	200	0.13
Daffy Duck builds a nest in Elmer Fudd's satellite dish.
68a	7a	"Feather of the Bride"	Ryan Kramer	Mike Pelensky; Ryan Kramer; Johnny Ryan; Jacob Fleisher	Mike Pelensky	Carl Johnson	April 6, 2023	August 19, 2023	130	0.11
Foghorn Leghorn attempts to charm his future father-in-law: Miss Prissy's father.
68b	7b	"Daffy Magician: Pick A Card"	David Gemmill	Mike Ruocco; David Gemmill; Johnny Ryan; Jacob Fleisher	Mike Ruocco	Carl Johnson	April 6, 2023	August 19, 2023	177B	0.11
Daffy Duck performs a card trick on Porky Pig.
68c	7c	"Bugs Hole Gags 2: Rattlesnakes"	David Gemmill	Ryan Khatam; David Gemmill; Johnny Ryan; Jacob Fleisher	Ryan Khatam	Carl Johnson	April 6, 2023	August 19, 2023	157D	0.11
While hunting Bugs Bunny, the wabbit makes a three cup type trick on Elmer Fudd. When the happless hunter picks out one hole, he grabs a bunch of snakes.
69a	8a	"Poolside Pest"	David Gemmill	Caroline Director; David Gemmill; Johnny Ryan; Jacob Fleisher	Caroline Director	Carl Johnson	April 6, 2023	August 19, 2023	129	0.11
Daffy Duck helps Elmer Fudd relax at the pool.
69b	8b	"Put the Cat Out: Inside Out"	Ryan Kramer	Mike Pelensky; Ryan Kramer; Johnny Ryan; Jacob Fleisher	Mike Pelensky	Carl Johnson	April 6, 2023	August 19, 2023	TBA	0.11
Sylvester builds the inside of Porky Pig's house outside so that Sylvester can get back into the house.
69c	8c	"Bulls-Eye Bunny"	Kenny Pittenger	David Shair; Kenny Pittenger; Johnny Ryan; Jacob Fleisher	David Shair	Joshua Moshier	April 6, 2023	August 19, 2023	199	0.11
Bugs Bunny "helps" Yosemite Sam, here named Stiletto Sam, with his knife throwing show.
70a	9a	"Auto Birdy Shop"	Ryan Kramer	Andy Gonsalves; Ryan Kramer; Johnny Ryan; Jacob Fleisher	Andy Gonsalves	Joshua Moshier	April 6, 2023	August 26, 2023	150	0.10
Sylvester attempts to catch Tweety at an auto shop.
70b	9b	"Daffy Traffic Cop Stop: Phone Booth"	David Gemmill	Ryan Khatam; David Gemmill; Johnny Ryan; Jacob Fleisher	Ryan Khatam	Joshua Moshier	April 6, 2023	August 26, 2023	TBA	0.10
Daffy Duck gets pulled over by Officer Porky Pig for talking on the phone.
70c	9c	"Eyes Wide Fudd"	Kenny Pittenger	Andrew Dickman; Kenny Pittenger; Johnny Ryan; Jacob Fleisher	Andrew Dickman	Carl Johnson	April 6, 2023	August 26, 2023	168	0.10
Elmer Fudd makes Daffy Duck face some trying trials to gain acceptance into his secret order.
71a	10a	"Livin' the Daydream"	Ryan Kramer	Andy Gonsalves; Ryan Kramer; Johnny Ryan; Jacob Fleisher	Andy Gonsalves	Carl Johnson	April 6, 2023	August 26, 2023	205	0.10
Ralph Phillips's daydreams get out of hand while he's shopping with his mother.
71b	10b	"Duck Hunting Gag: Holograms"	Ryan Kramer	Andy Gonsalves; Ryan Kramer; Johnny Ryan; Jacob Fleisher	Andy Gonsalves	Joshua Moshier	April 6, 2023	August 26, 2023	175A	0.10
Elmer Fudd uses a hologram to try and catch Daffy Duck, but Daffy ends up becoming friends with it.
71c	10c	"Fake It 'Til You Bake It"	Ryan Kramer	Stephen Herczeg; Ryan Kramer; Alex Kirwan; Johnny Ryan; Jacob Fleisher	Stephen Herczeg	Carl Johnson	April 6, 2023	August 26, 2023	198	0.10
Petunia Pig attempts to bake Porky a birthday cake.
72a	11a	"Funny Book Bunny"	Kenny Pittenger	Gabe Del Valle; Kenny Pittenger; Alex Kirwan; Johnny Ryan; Jacob Fleisher	Gabe Del Valle	Carl Johnson	April 6, 2023	September 2, 2023	202	0.18
To get even for the times that Bugs Bunny humiliated him over the years, Elmer Fudd decides to make a comic book of himself getting revenge. However, while he's answering a phone call, the comic's Bugs and Elmer come to life and start fighting each other.
72b	11b	"Balloon Salesman: All the Balloons"	Ryan Kramer	Stephen Herczeg; Ryan Kramer; Johnny Ryan; Jacob Fleisher	Stephen Herczeg	Carl Johnson	April 6, 2023	September 2, 2023	TBA	0.18
Daffy Duck warns Porky Pig about his balloons after he asks to purchase all of his balloons.
72c	11c	"Kitty Krashers"	Kenny Pittenger	Gabe Del Valle; Kenny Pittenger; Alex Kirwan; Johnny Ryan; Jacob Fleisher	Gabe Del Valle	Joshua Moshier	April 6, 2023	September 2, 2023	174	0.18
Porky Pig disguises himself as a cat to get back inside, after Sylvester and his alley cat friends throws a party in his house.

=== Season 6 (2023–24) ===
No. overall	No. in season	Title	Directed by	Written by	Storyboarded by	Music by	Original release date	Cartoon Network air date	Prod. code
73a	1a	"Birthday Grifts"	David Gemmill	Ryan Khatam, David Gemmill, Johnny Ryan, Jacob Fleisher	Ryan Khatam	Joshua Moshier	July 27, 2023	TBA	071
After he eats Elmer Fudd's birthday cake, Bugs Bunny tries to "make it up to him" by showing him the best birthday party ever.
73b	1b	"Daffy Magician: Vintage Porkys"	David Gemmill	Mike Ruocco, David Gemmill, Johnny Ryan, Jacob Fleisher	Mike Ruocco	Carl Johnson	July 27, 2023	TBA	177D
Daffy Duck performs a magic trick on Porky Pig that turns him into various previous incarnations of himself from the classic theatrical shorts, even his "3D-esque" form in the original Space Jam and Back in Action films.
73c	1c	"Tub-o-War"	Ryan Kramer	Andy Gonsalves, Ryan Kramer, Jacob Fleisher and Johnny Ryan	Andy Gonsalves	Carl Johnson	July 27, 2023	TBA	186
Marvin the Martian tries to get K-9 to take a bath.
74a	2a	"Oregon Fail"	Ryan Kramer	Andy Gonsalves, Ryan Kramer, Jacob Fleisher and Johnny Ryan	Andy Gonsalves	Carl Johnson	July 27, 2023	TBA	169
Bugs Bunny messes with Yosemite Sam's journey to get to Oregon.
74b	2b	"Duck Hunting Gag: Duck Call"	Ryan Kramer	Andy Gonsalves, Ryan Kramer, Johnny Ryan, Jacob Fleisher	Andy Gonsalves	Joshua Moshier	July 27, 2023	TBA	175B
Daffy Duck gives Elmer Fudd a huge duck whistle to help improve his hunting skills, which attracts a gigantic mallard.
74c	2c	"Life's a Beach"	Kenny Pittenger	Andrew Dickman, Kenny Pittenger, Alex Kirwan, Johnny Ryan, Jacob Fleisher	Andrew Dickman	Joshua Moshier	July 27, 2023	TBA	188
The Three Bears take a trip to the beach, where Pa is constantly irritated by his family.
75a	3a	"Pearl of My Dreams"	Pete Browngardt	Gabe Del Valle, Pete Browngardt, Johnny Ryan, Jacob Fleisher	Gabe Del Valle	Carl Johnson	July 27, 2023	TBA	067
Porky Pig and Daffy Duck go searching for a very special pearl under the sea.
75b	3b	"Bugs Hole Gags 2: Down the Drain"	David Gemmill	Ryan Khatam, David Gemmill, Johnny Ryan, Jacob Fleisher	Ryan Khatam	Carl Johnson	July 27, 2023	TBA	157E
Elmer Fudd pulls out a drain in Bugs Bunny's hole.
75c	3c	"Mech a Mess"	David Gemmill	Ryan Khatam, David Gemmill, Johnny Ryan, Jacob Fleisher	Ryan Khatam	Carl Johnson	July 27, 2023	TBA	TBA
Wile E. Coyote buys a mechanical flying suit to catch the Road Runner.
76a	4a	"Boarding Games"	Kenny Pittenger	Andrew Dickman, Kenny Pittenger, Jacob Fleisher and Johnny Ryan	Andrew Dickman	Joshua Moshier	July 27, 2023	TBA	171
At a dog and cat hotel, Marc Anthony tries to hide Pussyfoot from a bunch of dogs.
76b	4b	"Put the Cat Out: Paintings"	Ryan Kramer	Mike Pelensky, Ryan Khatam, Johnny Ryan, Jacob Fleisher	Mike Pelensky	Carl Johnson	July 27, 2023	TBA	TBA
Sylvester paints a picture of Porky Pig's mother to make him come outside, giving Sylvester a chance to go inside the house.
76c	4c	"Winter Hungerland"	Kenny Pittenger	David Shair, Kenny Pittenger, Johnny Ryan, Jacob Fleisher	David Shair	Joshua Moshier	July 27, 2023	TBA	189
Ralph Wolf tries to catch the sheep from Sam Sheepdog during the winter.
77a	5a	"Tweet Suite"	Ryan Kramer	Stephen Herczeg, Ryan Kramer, Johnny Ryan, Jacob Fleisher	Stephen Herczeg	Joshua Moshier	July 27, 2023	TBA	173
In order to get into a secret club of alley cats, Sylvester tries to bring back a little canary from a hotel namely, the bird being, Tweety.
77b	5b	"Daffy Magician: Cut in Half"	David Gemmill	Mike Ruocco, David Gemmill, Johnny Ryan, Jacob Fleisher	Mike Ruocco	Carl Johnson	July 27, 2023	TBA	177C
Daffy Duck performs a cut in half trick on Porky Pig.
77c	5c	"Desert Menu"	David Gemmill	Mike Ruocco, David Gemmill, Johnny Ryan, Jacob Fleisher	Mike Ruocco	Carl Johnson	July 27, 2023	TBA	201
Bugs Bunny tries to trick Beaky Buzzard into eating something else.
78a	6a	"Abducted Bunny"	Kenny Pittenger	Gabe Del Valle, Kenny Pittenger, Johnny Ryan, and Jacob Fleisher	Gabe Del Valle	Carl Johnson	July 27, 2023	TBA	017
Bugs Bunny avoids getting his brain collected by Marvin the Martian.
78b	6b	"Daffy Psychic: A New Job"	Ryan Kramer	Chris Allison, Ryan Kramer, Johnny Ryan, and Jacob Fleisher	Chris Allison	Joshua Moshier	July 27, 2023	TBA	TBA
Daffy Duck reads Porky Pig's future that he is going to be working as a psychic.
78c	6c	"Duck Hunting Gag: Decoy"	Ryan Kramer	Andy Gonsalves, Ryan Kramer, Johnny Ryan, Jacob Fleisher	Andy Gonsalves	Joshua Moshier	July 27, 2023	TBA	175C
Elmer Fudd uses an explosive duck decoy to catch Daffy Duck.
78d	6d	"Daffy Magician: Skeleton"	David Gemmill	Mike Ruocco, David Gemmill, Johnny Ryan, Jacob Fleisher	Mike Ruocco	Carl Johnson	July 27, 2023	TBA	177E
When Daffy Duck does a magic trick on Porky Pig, he ends up pulling out his skeleton.
79a	7a	"Feline Lucky"	Kenny Pittenger	Andrew Dickman, Kenny Pittenger, Johnny Ryan, Jacob Fleisher	Andrew Dickman	Carl Johnson	July 27, 2023	TBA	203
Sylvester tries to catch Tweety at a casino.
79b	7b	"A Prickly Pair"	David Gemmill	Mike Ruocco, David Gemmill, Alex Kirwan, Johnny Ryan, Jacob Fleisher	Mike Ruocco	Joshua Moshier	July 27, 2023	TBA	190
Beaky Buzzard falls in love with a buzzard-shaped cactus.
80a	8a	"Wrong with the Wind"	Kenny Pittenger	Andrew Dickman, Kenny Pittenger, Johnny Ryan, Jacob Fleisher	Andrew Dickman	Carl Johnson	July 27, 2023	TBA	101
Porky Pig tries to tell his gardener, Daffy Duck, to turn his leaf blower down while he's on a call with his boss.
80b	8b	"Daffy Magician: Pigs Feet"	David Gemmill	Mike Ruocco, David Gemmill, Johnny Ryan, Jacob Fleisher	Mike Ruocco	Carl Johnson	July 27, 2023	TBA	177F
Daffy Duck performs a box trick on Porky Pig, but it ends out with three sets of his feet.
80c	8c	"Moody at the Movies"	Kenny Pittenger	Andrew Dickman, Kenny Pittenger, Johnny Ryan, Jacob Fleisher	Andrew Dickman	Joshua Moshier	July 27, 2023	TBA	196
Henry Bear tries to enjoy a movie at the theatre, but the family keeps making noises and asking him for things.
81a	9a	"Boardwalk Bunny"	Ryan Kramer	Andy Gonsalves, Ryan Kramer, Johnny Ryan, Jacob Fleisher	Andy Gonsalves	Joshua Moshier	July 27, 2023	TBA	195
Yosemite Sam, here named Carnie Sam, tries to make Bugs Bunny give up his dollar to him in a series of boardwalk carnival games.
81b	9b	"Duck Hunting Gag: Crossbow"	Ryan Kramer	Andy Gonsalves, Ryan Kramer, Johnny Ryan, Jacob Fleisher	Andy Gonsalves	Joshua Moshier	July 27, 2023	TBA	175D
Elmer Fudd uses a crossbow to catch Daffy Duck.
81c	9c	"Cat Fished"	David Gemmill	Ryan Khatam, David Gemmill, Johnny Ryan, Jacob Fleisher	Ryan Khatam	Carl Johnson	July 27, 2023	TBA	208
Sylvester disguises himself as Granny's date in order to get Tweety.
82	10	"Daffy in Wackyland"	Max Winston	Max Winston	Max Winston	Joshua Moshier	June 13, 2024	TBA	154
A starved Daffy Duck stranded in the desert comes across a tasty egg with red polka dots. When he prepares to eat it for dinner, it is taken away by the Do-Do Bird that laid it. Daffy chases the Do-Do Bird around Wackyland to retrieve it.: Note: This short was screened at the Annecy International Animated Film Festival on June 17, 2023.

=== Unpackaged shorts ===
Title	Directed by	Written by	Storyboarded by	Music by	Original release date	Prod. code
"Dynamite Dance"	David Gemmill	Pete Browngardt; David Gemmill; Johnny Ryan	David Gemmill	Carl Johnson	TBA	030
Accompanied by a segment of Dance of the Hours, Bugs Bunny is once again trying to evade Elmer Fudd, but this time, he has a new weapon up his sleeve: dynamite.: Note: This short was released on YouTube on June 12, 2019 as a preview to the show.
"High Hopes"	Kenny Pittenger	David Shair; Kenny Pittenger; Johnny Ryan; Jacob Fleisher	David Shair	Carl Johnson	TBA	089
Sylvester tries to capture Tweety while Granny takes some much needed "me-time".: Notes: This short was released on YouTube on January 22, 2021. Produced in 9:16 video format.
"Hole Lotta Trouble"	Pete Browngardt	Gabe Del Valle; Johnny Ryan; Jacob Fleisher	Gabe Del Valle	Carl Johnson	TBA	086
Elmer Fudd chases Bugs Bunny down a rabbit hole, but Bugs has a few tricks up his sleeve.: Note: This short was released on YouTube on January 29, 2021. Produced in 9:16 video format.
"Sick as a Hare"	Ryan Kramer	TBA	TBA	TBA	TBA	014
Bugs Bunny pretends to be sick so Elmer Fudd is forced to nurse him back to health before he can cook him.: Note: This short was screened at Annecy in June 2019.
"Happy Birthday Bugs Bunny!"	David Gemmill	Michael Ruocco; David Gemmill; Johnny Ryan; Jacob Fleisher	Michael Ruocco	Carl Johnson	TBA	TBA
As the Tunes celebrate Bugs Bunny's birthday, Elmer Fudd gives Bugs a cake with dynamite for a candle. Bugs blows it into Elmer's face.: Note: This short was released on YouTube on July 27, 2020. An alternate version removing Pepé Le Pew and featuring the rest of the Tunes celebrating the 60th anniversary of the Annecy International Animation Film Festival was released on YouTube on May 10, 2021.; Note 2: This short features cameos from Daffy Duck, The Gremlin, Porky Pig, Petunia Pig, Gossamer, Pepé Le Pew, Speedy Gonzales, Pete Puma, Granny, Tweety, Sylvester, Foghorn Leghorn, Beaky Buzzard, Yosemite Sam, Wile E. Coyote and the Road Runner, Taz, Marvin the Martian, Cecil Turtle, Barnyard Dawg, Witch Hazel, Charlie Dog, The Weasel, an Instant Martian, Cool Cat, Hubie and Bertie, Hippety Hopper, Egghead, Rocky and Mugsy, Egghead Jr., The Dodo, The Crusher, Sam Sheepdog, The Goofy Gophers, Miss Prissy, Playboy Penguin, The Three Bears, Marc Antony and Pussyfoot, Henery Hawk, Hugo the Abominable Snowman, Sniffles, and Sylvester Jr.
"A Hard Pill to Swallow"	TBA	Gabe Del Valle	Gabe Del Valle	TBA	TBA	TBA
Wile E. Coyote uses super pellets in order to catch Road Runner.: Note: This short was released during the Looney Tunes Cartoons San Diego Comic Con At Home Panel on July 24, 2021.; Note 2: According to the EIDR record, this short was planned to be paired with "Rabbit Sandwich Maker" and "Bullseye" before being pulled for unknown reasons.
"Build-a-Lings"	TBA	TBA	TBA	TBA	TBA	TBA
"Life Boat"	TBA	TBA	TBA	TBA	TBA	TBA
"There Will Be Fudd"	TBA	TBA	TBA	TBA	TBA	063
"Car Wars"	TBA	TBA	TBA	TBA	TBA	008
"Big Rig Bunny"	TBA	TBA	TBA	TBA	TBA	018
"Beach Blanket Bunny"	TBA	TBA	TBA	TBA	TBA	090
"Pwastic Suwgeon: Calves"	TBA	TBA	TBA	TBA	TBA	TBA
"Pwastic Suwgeon: Pecs"	TBA	TBA	TBA	TBA	TBA	TBA
