= Looney Tunes Cartoons =

American animated television series

- Genre: Slapstick comedy
- Based on: Looney Tunes and Merrie Melodies by Warner Bros.
- Developed by: Pete Browngardt
- Voices of: Eric Bauza; Jeff Bergman; Bob Bergen; Fred Tatasciore; Candi Milo
- Music by: Carl Johnson; Joshua Moshier
- Opening theme: "The Merry-Go-Round Broke Down" by Cliff Friend; Dave Franklin "Merrily We Roll Along" by Charles Tobias; Murray Mencher; Eddie Cantor
- Ending theme: "What's Up, Doc?" by Carl W. Stalling
- Country of origin: United States
- Original language: English
- No. of seasons: 6
- No. of episodes: 82 (list of episodes)

Production
- Executive producers: Pete Browngardt; Sam Register
- Producer: Rebecca Palatnik
- Editors: Nick Simotas; Tommy Meehan
- Running time: 9–30 minutes
- Production company: Warner Bros. Animation

Original release
- Network: HBO Max (Note: The streaming service was rebranded as "Max," which ran from 2023 to 2025, before reverting back to its original name.)
- Release: May 27, 2020 – June 13, 2024

Related
- List of Looney Tunes television series

Looney Tunes Cartoons is an American animated television series developed by Pete Browngardt and produced by Warner Bros. Animation, based on the characters from Looney Tunes and Merrie Melodies. The series made its worldwide debut at the Annecy International Animation Film Festival on June 10, 2019, and officially premiered on HBO Max on May 27, 2020. The series ended on June 13, 2024, concluding after its sixth season.

== Production ==
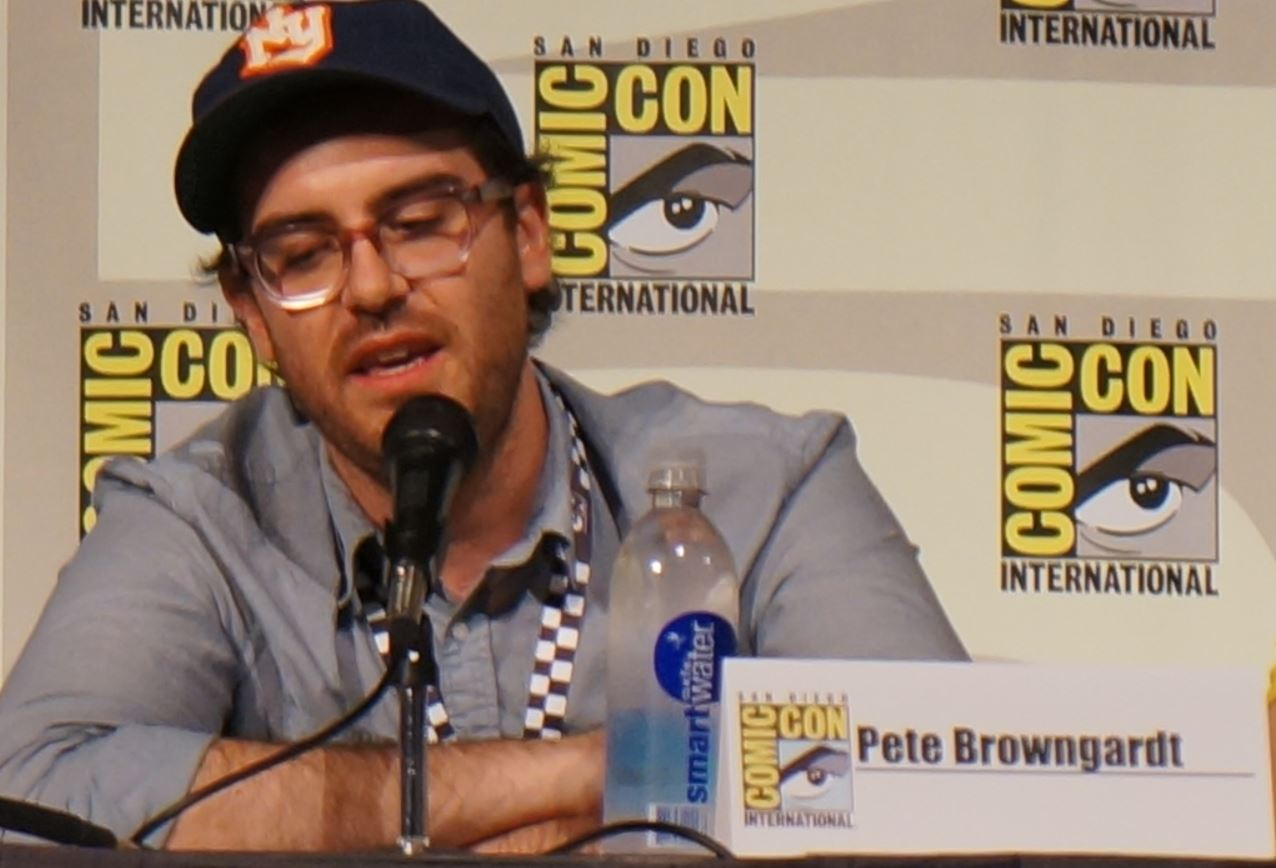
Peter Browngardt came up with the idea of rebooting Looney Tunes in its classic 1940s form.

In 2017, after Peter Browngardt finished Uncle Grandpa for Cartoon Network, he met with Audrey Diehl, the creative executive at Warner Bros., at a lunch meeting. They discussed a project in which he was not interested, and as they wrapped up lunch, Pete said, "You know, what I really want to do is to direct a Looney Tunes short." She was surprised that he was a fan of Looney Tunes and booked him a meeting with studio president, Sam Register. Browngardt expressed that he wanted to direct it in the spirit of the classic 1940s cartoons. He then began casting, hiring Eric Bauza, and as an admirer of Jim Soper's art on Instagram, hired him as a character designer.

While the previous series New Looney Tunes was still producing its second and third seasons, Warner Bros. Animation announced a new series in June 2018, to "consist of 1,000 minutes spread across 1–6 minute shorts each season," be released in 2019 and featuring "the brand's marquee characters voiced by their current voice actors in simple gag-driven and visually vibrant stories." The style of the series is reminiscent of the classic Looney Tunes shorts, primarily those by Tex Avery and Bob Clampett. Register and Browngardt serve as executive producers for the series. The characters are designed by Jim Soper, with the model sheets copyright dating back to 2018. The initial designs for Looney Tunes Cartoons were previewed in the Warner Bros. Animation logo that was first shown before Teen Titans Go! To the Movies and in subsequent WB direct-to-video films, the logo featuring Daffy Duck and Porky Pig and itself directed and storyboarded by Browngardt and animated by animation veteran Eric Goldberg. The animation of the series was directed by Joey Capps, who also did animation work on Adult Swim's Superjail!

The series features the majority of the Looney Tunes repertoire, with some notable one-off characters receiving a second appearance. Among those featured include Bugs Bunny, Daffy, Tweety, Sylvester, Porky, Elmer Fudd, Yosemite Sam, Granny, Marvin the Martian, Beaky and Mama Buzzard, Wile E. Coyote and the Road Runner, Cecil Turtle, Ralph Wolf and Sam Sheepdog, Cicero Pig, Taz, Gossamer, Dr. Frankenbeans, Witch Hazel, Petunia Pig, Rocky and Mugsy, Clancy Cop, the Gashouse Gorillas, the Russian Dog, Doctor Quack, Foghorn Leghorn, Barnyard Dawg, Hector the Bulldog, the Dead End Kid, Pete Puma, Hubie and Bertie, Claude Cat, Gruesome Gorilla and the Mrs., the Gremlin, Miss Prissy, Marc Antony and Pussyfoot, K-9, Charlie Dog, and the Three Bears.

The animation for the series was outsourced to different studios, including Yowza! Animation, Yearim Productions, Snipple Animation, and Tonic DNA. A trailer for the series was released on April 21, 2020. The short "Pest Coaster" was released on May 5 on the WB Kids YouTube channel as a sneak preview ahead of the release date.

Copious amounts of cartoon violence and Acme Corporation weaponry are featured, as typical for the franchise, but excluded in the first season only are any depictions of firearms; Elmer Fudd, for example, used different non-firearm weapons (e.i. a scythe or an axe) to hunt Bugs Bunny instead of his shotgun. With the release of Space Jam: A New Legacy, the restriction was removed.

After a brief period of delay, Browngardt confirmed production had resumed for more episodes in 2020 as a result of the COVID-19 pandemic. Five new segments were released under the umbrella title Bugs Bunny's 24-Carrot Holiday Special on December 3, 2020.

Jim Soper stated in May 2021 that the series had wrapped up its first 1,000 minutes' worth of content, with the remaining episodes to be released on HBO Max at later dates. On July 9, 2022, Warner Bros. Discovery announced that there would be a Looney Tunes-themed panel at San Diego Comic-Con called Looney Tunes for Everyone, which had the crew from Looney Tunes Cartoons alongside the then-upcoming Bugs Bunny Builders and Tiny Toons Looniversity, including supervising producer Alex Kirwan and voice actor Eric Bauza. The panel commenced at 10 A.M. on July 22.

On July 22, 2022, it was announced that a Halloween special titled Bugs Bunny's Howl-O-Skreem Spooktacula and a new season would be released. The special was released on September 29, 2022.

On November 22, 2022, Browngardt announced that production was finally finished, with 209 shorts produced. More episodes were confirmed to release in 2023.

The rest of the fifth season premiered on April 6, 2023.

On June 16, 2023, a stop-motion short titled "Daffy in Wackyland" was announced to premiere at the Annecy International Animation Film Festival on the following day.

The final season was released on July 27, 2023.

On September 21, 2023, an event in celebration of Warner Bros.' 100th anniversary was announced to take place at the Animation Is Film Festival on October 22, which includes a Q&A and screenings of "Daffy in Wackyland" and several unreleased shorts.

On June 13, 2024, "Daffy in Wackyland" was released on HBO Max as a bonus episode of season six.

== Voice cast ==
- Eric Bauza as Bugs Bunny, Daffy Duck, Tweety, Barnyard Dawg, Marvin the Martian, Claude Cat, Charlie Dog, The Weasel, Kitten, The Do-Do, Doctor Quack, and The French Horse
- Jeff Bergman as Sylvester, Elmer Fudd, Foghorn Leghorn, Ralph Wolf, and Hector the Bulldog
- Bob Bergen as Porky Pig, Cicero Pig, The Gremlin, The Dead End Kid, and Narrator
- Fred Tatasciore as Yosemite Sam, Taz, Gossamer, Sam Sheepdog, Mugsy, Marc Antony, Pussyfoot, Gruesome Gorilla, Mrs. Gruesome Gorilla, Cat 1, The Judge, The Mummy, Papa Prissy, the Narrator, Satan, Santa Claus, Monster, and The Grim Reaper
- Candi Milo as Granny, Witch Hazel, Miss Prissy, and Mama Bear
- Paul Julian as the Road Runner (archival recording; uncredited)
- Michael Ruocco as Beaky Buzzard
- Keith Ferguson as Cecil Turtle and Champ
- Lara Jill Miller as Petunia Pig
- Stephen Stanton as Pete Puma and Baby Bear
- Sean Kenin as Hubie and Bertie
- James Adomian as Rocky
- Kevin Michael Richardson as The Gashouse Gorillas
- Rachel Butera as Mama Buzzard
- Kari Wahlgren as Lady, Ralph Phillips, Rich Lady, and Bear
- Peter Browngardt as Dumb Cat and Ox
- Carlos Alazraqui as Clancy Cop and The Leprechaun
- Tom Kenny as Dr. Frankenbeans and Alabaster "Kookoo" Kirwan
- James Arnold Taylor as Russian Dog
- Steve Blum as Goon and Proctor
- Corey Burton as Norm Macabre
- Roger Craig Smith as Dunk Ellington
- John DiMaggio as Pilgrim
- Jennifer Hale as Real Estate Agent
- Frank Welker as Golf Tournament Announcer ("Hole in Dumb")
- Kenny Pittenger as Opera Daffy
- Keone Young as Narrator ("Yosemite Samurai")
- Andrew Dickman as Papa Bear

Wile E. Coyote appears, but does not talk.

== Episodes ==
Season	Episodes		Originally released		
Season	Episodes		First released	Last released	Network
1	31	10	May 27, 2020		HBO Max
1	31	1	December 3, 2020		HBO Max
1	31	10	January 21, 2021		HBO Max
1	31	10	April 29, 2021		HBO Max
2	11	10	July 8, 2021		HBO Max
2	11	1	August 19, 2021		HBO Max
3	9		November 25, 2021		HBO Max
4	10		January 20, 2022		HBO Max
5	11		February 3, 2022	April 6, 2023	HBO Max
6	10	9	July 27, 2023		HBO Max
6	10	1	June 13, 2024		HBO Max

== Home media ==
10 episodes of the show (all centering around Bugs) were released as bonus features for the Bugs Bunny 80th Anniversary Collection Blu-ray set on December 1, 2020. The first season became available on iTunes on August 29, 2021.

The full series was released on DVD and Blu-ray on May 19, 2026.

== Release ==
Following its Annecy premiere, the series' first 10 episodes were released on HBO Max on May 27, 2020, with the next 20 episodes released through April 29, 2021. The series also premiered on Cartoon Network on July 5, 2021, to promote Space Jam: A New Legacy. On April Fools' Day, ACME Night aired a marathon of selected shorts with segments of Bugs Bunny pulling pranks on illusionist Kevin Parry.

=== International broadcast ===
In Canada, the series premiered on Teletoon on October 11, 2020. In Australia and New Zealand, the series premiered on Cartoon Network on April 23, 2021. In the United Kingdom and Ireland, the series premiered on Boomerang on June 7, 2021. On the same date, it premiered on Boomerang in Central and Eastern Europe. In Japan, the series premiered on Cartoon Network on August 15, 2021.

== Reception ==
The first ten shorts debuted at the Annecy International Animated Film Festival in June 2019, and were met with very positive reactions, being described as true to the spirit of the original Looney Tunes shorts. Film reviewing site Oneofus.net noted: "While only time will tell if these shorts will become classics, they decidedly will be seen as a noble attempt to bring the "Looney" back into Looney Tunes. The cartoons are manic, beautifully animated, and feature amazing voice acting. Even the music tries to recapture the spirit of the originals. Even the characters are doing like what they did in old 30s and 40s shorts."

The official launch of the first ten episodes with HBO Max was also met with positive reviews. Review aggregator Rotten Tomatoes reported an approval rating of 88% based on 25 reviews, with an average rating of 8.00/10. The critics' consensus reads: "A vibrantly goofy return to form, Looney Tunes Cartoons is perfectly calibrated cartoon comedy." Metacritic gave the series a weighted score of 71 out of 100 based on 11 reviews, indicating "generally favorable" reviews.

=== Accolades ===
Year	Ceremony	Award/Category	Nominee	Recipient	Status	Ref.
2021	Annie Awards	Outstanding Achievement for Storyboarding in an Animated Television / Broadcast Production	"Big League Beast" / "Firehouse Frenzy"	Andrew Dickman	Won	
2021	Annie Awards	Outstanding Achievement for Character Design in an Animated Television / Broadcast Production	Looney Tunes Cartoons	Jim Soper	Nominated	
2021	48th Daytime Creative Arts Emmy Awards	Outstanding Performer in an Animated Program	Bugs Bunny / Daffy Duck	Eric Bauza	Nominated	
2021	48th Daytime Creative Arts Emmy Awards	Outstanding Editing for an Animated Program	Looney Tunes Cartoons	Nick Simotas	Nominated	
2022	2022 Kids' Choice Awards	Favorite Cartoon	Looney Tunes Cartoons	N/A	Nominated	
2022	Children's & Family Emmy Awards	Outstanding Voice Performance in an Animated Program	Bugs Bunny / Marvin the Martian / Daffy Duck / Tweety	Eric Bauza	Won	
2022	Children's & Family Emmy Awards	Outstanding Music Direction and Composition for an Animated Program	Looney Tunes Cartoons	Carl Johnson and Joshua Moshier	Nominated	
2023	Annie Awards	Outstanding Achievement for Storyboarding in an Animated Television / Broadcast Production	"Hex Appeal"	Michael Ruocco	Nominated	
2023	Annie Awards	Outstanding Achievement for Voice Acting in an Animated Television / Broadcast Production	"Hex Appeal"	Candi Milo	Nominated	
2023	Ottawa International Animation Festival	Animation for Teen Audiences 13+ Competition	"Daffy in Wackyland"	Max Winston	Won	
2023	Children's & Family Emmy Awards	Outstanding Voice Performance in an Animated Program	Porky Pig	Bob Bergen	Nominated	
2023	Children's & Family Emmy Awards	Outstanding Music Direction and Composition for an Animated Program	Looney Tunes Cartoons	Carl Johnson and Joshua Moshier	Nominated	
2025	Children's & Family Emmy Awards	Outstanding Voice Performance in an Animated Program	Porky Pig	Bob Bergen	Nominated	
2025	Children's & Family Emmy Awards	Outstanding Music Direction and Composition for an Animated Program	Looney Tunes Cartoons	Carl Johnson and Joshua Moshier	Nominated	
2026	Children's & Family Emmy Awards	Outstanding Individual Achievement in Animation – Character Animation	Looney Tunes Cartoons	Max Winston	Won	

== Spin-off film ==
A feature film based on the series, titled The Day the Earth Blew Up, was directed by Browngardt and co-written by Kevin Costello of Tom & Jerry, centering on Daffy Duck and Porky Pig trying to stop an alien invasion. It was originally set to be released on HBO Max; however, on August 22, 2022, it was announced the film would not be moving forward on HBO Max and would be shopped elsewhere. A one-minute clip of the film was released on September 22, 2022, to be shown later at the Ottawa International Animation Festival. On October 26, 2023, it was announced that the film would instead get a theatrical release; GFM Animation launched sales at the American Film Market from October 31 to November 5, 2023, where first look footage was shown. The film was released in theaters in March 14, 2025.
