= Tasmanian Devil (disambiguation) =

A Tasmanian devil is a Tasmanian marsupial.

Tasmanian Devil may also refer to:

== Characters ==
- Tasmanian Devil (Looney Tunes), an animated character
- Tasmanian Devil (DC Comics), a DC Comics superhero

== Entertainment ==
- Tasmanian Devils (film), a 2013 Syfy television film
- Tazmanian Devil (film), a 2020 American drama film starring Abraham Attah
- "Tasmanian Devil", a song by Shonen Knife from Adventure, 2016

== Sports ==
- Tasmania Devils (under-18s team), a Talent League team
- Tasmania Football Club (nicknamed Devils), a future Australian Football League, AFL Women's, and Victorian Football League team
- Tasmanian Devils (2001–2008), a former Victorian Football League team
- Hobart Tassie Devils, a former professional basketball team that competed in the National Basketball League.
- Tasmanian Devil (NHRA dragracing), Pacers Automotive's NHRA record-setting AA/A roadster from the 1960s.
