= Abraham Attah =

Ghanaian actor

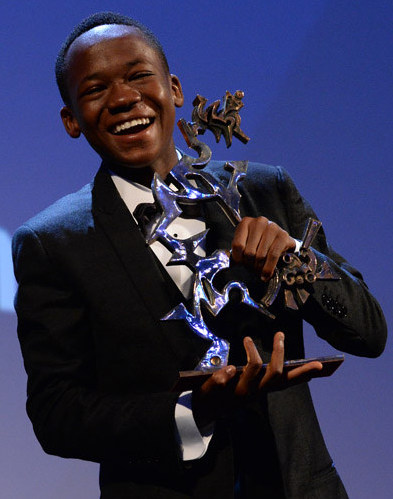
- Attah at the 72nd Venice International Film Festival with his Marcello Mastroianni Award in 2015
- Born: 2 July 2001 (age 25); Ghana
- Occupation: Actor
- Years active: 2015–present
- Awards: Marcello Mastroianni Award for Best Young Actor at the 72nd Venice International Film Festival

Abraham Nii Attah (born 2 July 2001) is a Ghanaian actor, living in the United States.

== Early life and education ==
He hails from Accra in Ghana. Abraham Nii Attah was born on July 2, 2001, and lived in Ashiaman, Tema, Accra with his parents, Mr. and Mrs. Attah, and his siblings up until he left for the United States. Growing up, he had a happy family life. Abraham's parents both have jobs; his father works at the port, and his mother works in a market. Abraham has five siblings in total.

Attah graduated from Tufts University in 2026.

== Career ==
He made his feature film debut in Beasts of No Nation (2015). For his leading role of child soldier Agu, he was awarded the Marcello Mastroianni Award for Best Young Actor at the 72nd Venice International Film Festival.

In 2017, he appeared in the Marvel Studios film Spider-Man: Homecoming.

== Filmography ==
=== Film ===
Year	Title	Role	Notes
2015	Beasts of No Nation	Agu	Won—Black Film Critics Circle Rising Star Award; Won—Ghana Movie Awards Best Actor in a Leading Role and Discovery of the Year; Won—Independent Spirit Award for Best Male Lead; Won—National Board of Review Award for Best Breakthrough Performance (shared with Jacob Tremblay); Won—Venice International Film Festival Marcello Mastroianni Best Young Actor Award; Nominated—Gold Derby Film Award for Best Breakthrough Performer; Nominated—Awards Circuit Community Award for Best Performance by an Actor in a Leading Role; Nominated—Critics' Choice Movie Award for Best Young Performer; Nominated—NAACP Image Award for Outstanding Actor in a Motion Picture; Nominated—Screen Actors Guild Award for Outstanding Performance by a Cast in a Motion Picture; Nominated—St. Louis Film Critics Award for Best Actor; Nominated—Washington D.C. Area Film Critics Association Award for Best Youth performance Nominated—Empire Award for Best Male Newcomer
2015	Out of the Village	Mebro	Short film
2017	Spider-Man: Homecoming	Abe Brown	
2020	Tazmanian Devil	Dayo Ayodele	
2021	Spider-Man: No Way Home	Abe Brown	Extended cut of 2021 film; archive footage: post-credits scene
