= Hair-Raising Hare =

1946 film

- Lobby card
- Directed by: Charles M. Jones
- Story by: Tedd Pierce
- Starring: Mel Blanc
- Music by: Carl W. Stalling
- Animation by: Ben Washam; Ken Harris; Basil Davidovich; Lloyd Vaughan
- Layouts by: Earl Klein
- Backgrounds by: Robert Gribbroek
- Color process: Technicolor
- Production company: Warner Bros. Cartoons
- Distributed by: Warner Bros. Pictures; The Vitaphone Corporation
- Release date: May 25, 1946
- Running time: 7:41
- Language: English

Hair-Raising Hare is a Warner Bros. Merrie Melodies cartoon, released on May 25, 1946. It was directed by Chuck Jones and written by Tedd Pierce. It stars Bugs Bunny and features the first appearance of Chuck Jones' orange monster character "Gossamer".

== Plot ==
One dark night, Bugs Bunny pokes up out of his rabbit hole, dressed in a nightshirt and holding a candle, and asks the audience, "Did you ever have the feeling you were being watched?" In fact, he is being watched by a mad scientist (a caricature of Peter Lorre) who is planning to catch a rabbit to provide dinner for his large, hairy, orange-red, sneaker-wearing monster (Gossamer).

The mad scientist lures Bugs to his castle via a shapely robotic female rabbit, with a large wind-up key in the back, and accompanied by "Oh, You Beautiful Doll". Once Bugs gets to the castle and begins kissing the mechanical rabbit on the hand, the robot malfunctions and breaks into pieces. Bugs faces the audience and says "That's the trouble with some dames... kiss 'em and they fly apart!"

Bugs heads for the door, but the mad scientist persuades him to stay and meet another "little friend". When it becomes clear that this "friend" is a ferocious beast, Bugs vigorously shakes the scientist's hand "Goodbye!" and launches into a schtick where he packs luggage for a vacation trip, accompanied by a very brassy rendition of "California, Here I Come". Just before bolting for the door, he tells the mad scientist, "And don't think this hasn't been a little slice of heaven...'cause it hasn't!" He then bolts for the door. The mad scientist releases Gossamer who chases Bugs.

Bugs hides behind a door that Gossamer is trying to break through, and he cries out, "Is there a doctor in the house?" A silhouette, seemingly from the theater audience, stands up and offers, "I'm a doctor." Bugs suddenly relaxes, starts munching a carrot, and asks, "What's up, Doc?", just before Gossamer breaks through and the chase resumes.

Bugs Bunny and Gossamer pass by a mirror; Gossamer looks at the mirror, then his reflection runs away screaming; Gossamer looks at the audience and shrugs. Bugs acts as a lamp; he dances to "Shuffle Off to Buffalo" and taunts Gossamer by calling "Hey, Frankenstein!". Bugs and Gossamer keep running until a door on the floor opens and a rock falls into the empty space. While Bugs is tip-toe-ing backwards and praying, he bumps into Gossamer. He comes up with an idea and gives him a manicure. He puts the monster's fingers into the water to have his fingernails cut, but it contains two mousetraps. The monster yelps in pain, and then sobs.

Bugs twice thinks he has escaped. The first time, the monster is hiding behind a picture frame and Bugs apparently was not aware until he poked Gossamer in the eye.

The second time, Gossamer is following Bugs behind a wall until Bugs marks where he previously was and smashes the mark with a giant mallet when Gossamer appears behind it. The wall crumbles and a barely-conscious Gossamer quickly follows.

The third time, Gossamer is in a knight's armor, holding an axe above his head. He gets hit by Bugs Bunny in his locomotive-style knight-riding horse, causing him to hit the wall to turn into a can called "Canned Monster".

However, as Bugs saunters off toward the exit, singing to himself, Gossamer gets the bunny in his clutches. Bugs repeats his opening line "Did you ever have the feeling you were being watched?" Gossamer's expression changes from anger to anxiety. Bugs points to the audience. Gossamer shrieks, "People!" and runs away screaming, breaking through a series of walls and leaving his cartoon silhouette in all of them.

Having "re-re-disposed of the monster", Bugs is about to "exit stage right", when the female robo-rabbit re-appears, intact, and again accompanied by "Oh, You Beautiful Doll". Bugs snickers "Mechanical!" Then the robot smooches him on the cheek, leaving a lipstick mark on the smitten bunny, who says "Well, so it's mechanical!" He assumes a robot-like gait (with his tail rotating like the robot's wind-up key) and follows her off the screen.

== Cast ==
- Mel Blanc as Bugs Bunny, Gossamer and Mad Scientist

== Reception ==
Animation director J. J. Sedelmaier writes, "It's interesting to see how different Bugs' character is in this film, from, say, the cool and calm Bugs in Rabbit Seasoning (1952). He's much more the Groucho Marx type in this short; in fact, I doubt you'll find another cartoon in which he does the Groucho walk more than here. The other unique aspect that has always grabbed me about this particular cartoon is the design of the monster. Where do his hands and arms go when we don't see them? Why the sneakers? It's this sort of stuff that reminds me why I love good cartoons: You don't care about this stuff. You just enjoy it."

== Notes ==
This is the first short to use the 1946–1947 rings, evident from blue rings, one red ring, and red background.

This was the final appearance of Chuck Jones' Bugs Bunny design, as starting with his next Bugs Bunny cartoon (A Feather in His Hare), he would use Robert McKimson's design for the character.

After, many Bugs cartoon titles that substituted "hare" for "hair" in a punny way, this title includes both words, as homophones.

The "Is there a doctor in the house?" gag is an old one, for example in Horse Feathers where a player is injured; Groucho asks if there is a doctor in the stands; and when a doctor responds, Groucho asks, "How are you enjoying the game, Doc?"

Gossamer's next appearance was in Water, Water Every Hare.

== Home media ==
- Hair-Raising Hare is available in several issues of the Looney Tunes Golden Collection DVD box sets. It has been released independently on Disc 3 of the Looney Tunes Golden Collection: Volume 1. The short also appears in its entirety in the documentary Bugs Bunny: Superstar Part 2, which is available as a special feature on Disc 2 of the Looney Tunes Golden Collection: Volume 4. It can also be found in What's Up, Doc: A Salute to Bugs Bunny part 2 as a Special Feature on Looney Tunes Golden Collection: Volume 3, disc 3, as well as disc 1 of The Essential Bugs Bunny.
- Hair-Raising Hare is also featured on side 8 of the LaserDisc release "The Golden Age of Looney Tunes: Volume 1".
- Hair-Raising Hare is also available as a special feature on the DVD Bugs Bunny's Howl-oween Special.
- Hair-Raising Hare is also available on Looney Tunes Platinum Collection: Volume 3.
- Hair-Raising Hare is also available on Bugs Bunny 80th Anniversary Collection.

== See also ==
- Water, Water Every Hare – Another Looney Tunes cartoon where Gossamer worked for a mad scientist.
- Bugs Bunny filmography
- Looney Tunes and Merrie Melodies filmography (1940–1949)

Preceded by Hare Remover	Bugs Bunny Cartoons; 1946	Succeeded by Acrobatty Bunny
