= Kwesi Boakye =

American actor

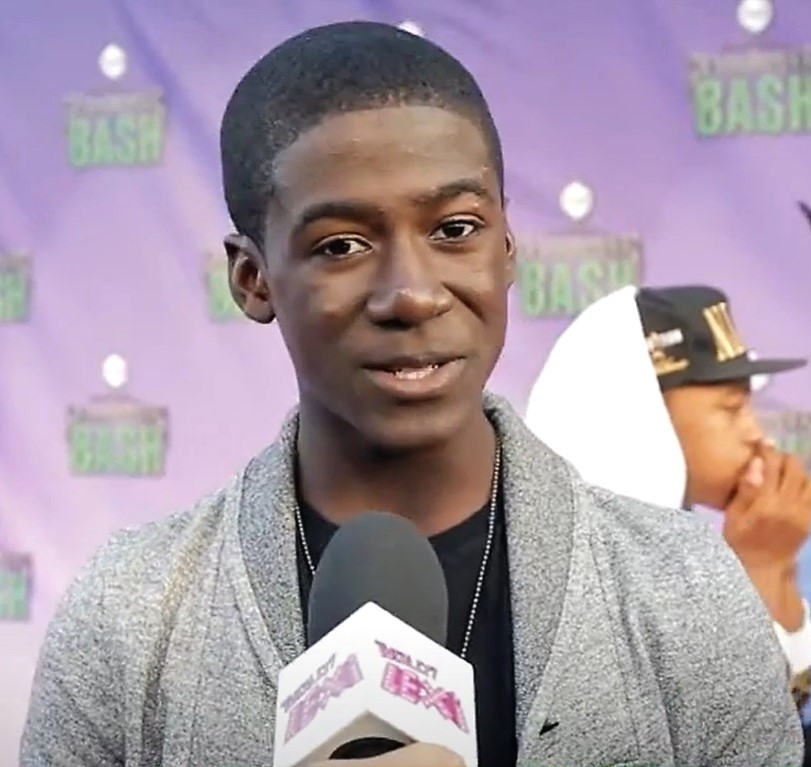
- Boakye at Hub Network Halloween Bash 2013
- Born: Kwesi Nii-Lante Boakye; Los Angeles, California, U.S.
- Occupation: Actor
- Years active: 2005–present
- Relatives: Kofi Siriboe (brother)

Kwesi Nii-Lante Boakye is an American actor. He is best known as the original voice of Darwin Watterson on the Cartoon Network animated TV series The Amazing World of Gumball. He voiced the character between 2011 and 2014. He also voiced Gossamer on The Looney Tunes Show. He also played Manny in the 2009 Tyler Perry film I Can Do Bad All By Myself.

== Early life ==
Kwesi Nii-Lante Boakye is the youngest of three brothers who are also actors; Kwame Boateng, and Kofi Siriboe. Boakye's family is originally from Ghana.

== Career ==
Boakye began his acting career at the age of six, making one-episode appearances on the television shows Strong Medicine and Inconceivable. He then appeared in eighteen episodes of the NBC soap opera series Days of Our Lives. In 2006, he appeared in five episodes of Day Break as James Mathis. He then began his voice acting career at the age of seven, where he provided several voices to the animated film Happy Feet. He then continued to make one-episode appearances on The Shield and 'Til Death, the latter in 2007. In the same year, he appeared as a little boy in the film If I Had Known I Was a Genius. He then appeared on an episode as Turnip in the legal drama series Boston Legal. In 2009, he appeared in Tyler Perry's I Can Do Bad All by Myself as Manny. He voiced Newspaper Boy on the Disney animated film The Princess and the Frog and starred on the TV series Men of a Certain Age as Jamie Thoreau.

In 2010, he appeared on the NBC television series Community as Elijah Bennett and the romantic comedy film Valentine's Day as a soccer kid. He also appeared as Andrew on an episode of the Playhouse Disney television series Special Agent Oso and William Glass in the TNT TV series Hawthorne. From 2011 to 2014, he voiced Darwin Watterson on Cartoon Network's The Amazing World of Gumball. During 2014, he was replaced by Terrell Ransom Jr. due to puberty. He appeared on an episode of Southland as Richard, Hawaii Five-0 as Kevin and The Mentalist as Anthony Rome. He also played young Narrator on two episodes of the TV series The Legion of Extraordinary Dancers. From 2011 to 2013, Boakye provided the voice of Gossamer on the television cartoon The Looney Tunes Show, which also aired on Cartoon Network. In 2012, he appeared on an episode of Touch as Farai and the biographical drama film Unconditional as Macon. He then provided the voice of The Passenger on the YouTube/VRV television series Bravest Warriors. In 2014, Boakye appeared on an episode of the ABC comedy-drama series Mind Games as Tyler.

He appeared in the black comedy film Pocket Listing as Billy and made three-episode appearances on Murder in the First and Colony. He most recently appeared in the TNT drama series Claws as Malik and the drama film Tazmanian Devil as Ike.

== Filmography ==
=== Film and television ===
Year	Title	Role	Notes
2005	Strong Medicine	Lavonne	1 episode
2005	Inconceivable	Kid	1 episode
2005–2007	Days of Our Lives	Artemis / Scott	18 episodes
2006–2007	Day Break	James Mathis	5 episodes
2006	Happy Feet	Other Voices	Film
2006	The Shield	Wendell	1 episode
2007	'Til Death	Kid	1 episode
2007	If I Had Known I Was a Genius	Little Boy	Film
2008	Boston Legal	Turnip	1 episode
2009	I Can Do Bad All By Myself	Manny	Film
2009	The Princess and the Frog	Newspaper Boy	Voice, film
2009–2011	Men of a Certain Age	Jamie Thoreau	14 episodes
2010–2012	Community	Elijah Bennett	2 episodes
2010	Faith and Dreams	Student	Short Film
2010	Valentine's Day	Soccer Kid	Film
2010	Special Agent Oso	Andrew	Episode: "Thunderbubble"
2010	Hawthorne	Willam Glass	1 episode
2011–2014	The Amazing World of Gumball	Darwin Watterson	Voice, main role (seasons 1-3)
2011	Southland	Richard	1 episode
2011	Hawaii Five-0	Kevin	1 episode
2011	The Mentalist	Anthony Rome	1 episode
2011	The Legion of Extraordinary Dancers	Young Narrator	2 episodes
2011–2013	The Looney Tunes Show	Gossamer	Voice, recurring role (14 episodes)
2012	Touch	Farai	1 episode
2012	Unconditional	Macon	Film
2012–2018	Bravest Warriors	The Passenger	Voice
2014	Sketch	Sketch	Short Film
2014	Mind Games	Tyler	1 episode
2015	Pocket Listing	Billy	Film
2015	Murder in the First	Kormega	3 episodes
2017	Colony	Emmett	3 episodes
2018	Claws	Malik	2 episodes
2019	Costume Quest	Benji Nichols	Voice, 3 episodes
2020	Tazmanian Devil	Ike	Film
