= Gossamer (Looney Tunes) =

Warner Bros. theatrical cartoon character

- Looney Tunes/Merrie Melodies character
- Gossamer and Bugs Bunny in Hair-Raising Hare
- First appearance: Hair-Raising Hare (May 25, 1946; 80 years ago)
- Created by: Chuck Jones; Tedd Pierce
- Designed by: Bob Givens
- Voiced by: Mel Blanc (1946–1980); Frank Welker (1990); Maurice LaMarche (1995, 2002); Jim Cummings (1996–2006, 2024); Joe Alaskey (2000–2001); Kwesi Boakye (2011–2013); Eric Bauza (2018, 2023–2026); Fred Tatasciore (2020–present)

In-universe information
- Alias: Rudolph (in Hair-Raising Hare)
- Species: Monster

Gossamer is a fictional cartoon character in the Warner Bros. Looney Tunes and Merrie Melodies series of cartoons. He is a large, hairy, orange or red monster. His body is perched on two giant tennis shoes, and his heart-shaped face is composed of only two oval eyes and a wide mouth, with two hulking arms ending in filthy, clawed fingers. The monster's main trait is his uncombed, orange hair. He originally was voiced by Mel Blanc, and has since been voiced by Frank Welker, Maurice LaMarche, Joe Alaskey, Jim Cummings, Kwesi Boakye, Eric Bauza and currently Fred Tatasciore.

The word gossamer means any sort of thin, fragile, transparent material. In particular, it can refer to a kind of delicate, sheer gauze or a light cobweb. The name is meant to be ironic because the character is large, menacing, and destructive.

== History ==
Animator Chuck Jones introduced the unnamed monster in the 1946 cartoon Hair-Raising Hare. In it, Bugs Bunny is lured to the lair of a mad scientist (a caricature of actor Peter Lorre). The monster serves as the scientist's henchman.

Part of this plot was repeated in the 1952 Jones cartoon Water, Water Every Hare in which the monster's character is referred to as "Rudolph" or simply "Monster". In need of a live brain for his giant robot, the mad scientist (this time a caricature of Boris Karloff) releases Rudolph from his chamber on a mission to capture Bugs Bunny; the monster shows a sudden burst of joyousness and quickly sets out when the mad scientist promises the reward of "spider goulash" for capturing the rabbit.

The monster next appears in Duck Dodgers and the Return of the 24½th Century in 1980. This is the first cartoon where the character is called "Gossamer", and is so named by Marvin the Martian. Jones gave the monster this name "because he's the opposite looking of gossamer. He's a big, hairy thing."

In the 1995 short film, Carrotblanca, Gossamer is seated at a table.

== Other appearances ==
Gossamer also has appeared in various Warner Bros. productions:

- Gossamer appeared as the creation of Elmyra in a Frankenstein parody segment from the 1995 Halloween special Tiny Toons’ Night Ghoulery.
- Gossamer appears as a boss in the video games Sheep Raider and Taz: Wanted
- Gossamer made a cameo in the 1996 film Space Jam, as part of the audience during the basketball game.
- Gossamer appears as a playable character in the video games Looney Tunes Racing, Looney Tunes: Back in Action, Looney Tunes: Acme Arsenal, Looney Tunes Dash and Looney Tunes: World of Mayhem.
- A toddler version of Gossamer appeared in the Baby Looney Tunes episode "Stop and Smell Up the Flowers". He frightens the other Baby Looney Tunes trying to get lemons from them. Gossamer is also a friend of Baby Pepé Le Pew.
- Gossamer appears in Bah, Humduck! A Looney Tunes Christmas, voiced by Jim Cummings. He is shown working as a security guard of the Lucky Duck Superstore.
- Gossamer appears in The Looney Tunes Show, voiced by Kwesi Boakye. Gossamer here is the opposite of previous portrayals, being a timid and kind child. He has a bond with Daffy Duck, who serves as a sort of mentor and father figure to him despite Daffy’s rivalry with Gossamer’s mother Witch Hazel.
- In the series Looney Tunes Cartoons, Gossamer is back to his classic role as a monster who hunts Bugs Bunny down. He tries to catch Bugs Bunny in "Big League Beast", voiced by Fred Tatasciore.
- Gossamer appears in the 2021 film Space Jam: A New Legacy. He appears as a member of the Tune Squad during the basketball match against the Goon Squad where he was briefly burned by Wet-Fire's fire form. During the second half of the game, Gossamer's fur was briefly used to absorb Wet-Fire's water form. Foghorn Leghorn had to wring out Gossamer afterwards.
- Gossamer appears in Bugs Bunny Builders, voiced again by Fred Tatasciore. In the series, like in The Looney Tunes Show, he spoke but this time he is an adult.
- Gossamer features in MultiVersus as an unlockable ringout animation effect.
- Gossamer appears in the Tiny Toons Looniversity episode in the "Things That Go Tweet in the Woods".
- Gossamer made a cameo in the 2026 film Coyote vs. Acme where he serves the titular lawsuit to the Acme Corporation's legal department.
