= Tazmanian Devil (film) =

- Directed by: Solomon Onita Jr.
- Written by: Solomon Onita Jr.
- Produced by: Frank Cohen; Adam Dietrich; Karl Soelter; Tricia Woodgett
- Starring: Abraham Attah
- Cinematography: Mike Buchbauer
- Edited by: Andre Jones
- Music by: Mervyn Warren
- Distributed by: 1091 Pictures
- Release date: August 2020 (American Black Film Festival)
- Country: United States
- Language: English

Tazmanian Devil is a 2020 American drama film written and directed by Solomon Onita Jr. and starring Abraham Attah.

== Cast ==
- Adepero Oduye as Elizabeth Ayodele
- Abraham Attah as Dayo Ayodele
- Ntare Mwine as Julius Ayodele
- Kwesi Boakye as Ike

== Production ==
Principal photography took place in Dallas. In June 2019, it was confirmed that the film was in post-production.

== Release ==
The film premiered in August 2020 at the American Black Film Festival. In January 2021, 1091 Pictures acquired distribution rights to the film.

== Reception ==
Alex Saveliev of Film Threat gave the film a 5 out of 10.

== Accolade ==
For his work in the film, Solomon Onita Jr. won the John Singleton Director Award for Best First Feature at the American Black Film Festival.
