= Gorilla My Dreams =

1948 film by Robert McKimson

- Lobby card
- Directed by: Robert McKimson
- Story by: Warren Foster
- Starring: Mel Blanc
- Music by: Carl Stalling
- Animation by: Charles McKimson; Manny Gould; John Carey
- Layouts by: Cornett Wood
- Backgrounds by: Richard H. Thomas
- Color process: Technicolor
- Production company: Warner Bros. Cartoons
- Distributed by: Warner Bros. Pictures
- Release date: January 3, 1948
- Running time: 7:25
- Language: English

Gorilla My Dreams is a Warner Bros. Looney Tunes theatrical animated short directed by Robert McKimson and written by Warren Foster. The short was released on January 3, 1948, and stars Bugs Bunny.

The story is a parody of the many jungle films that were prominent in the 1930s and 1940s which often featured gorillas extensively (though not always behaviorally accurately), most notably the Tarzan films. The title is a play on the expression "Girl o' My Dreams". The short featured Gruesome Gorilla, who reappeared in Hurdy-Gurdy Hare and as a boss in Bugs Bunny and Taz Time Busters.

The cartoon was remade in 1959 as Apes of Wrath. The Gorillas later make their appearance in Looney Tunes Cartoons Valentine’s Extwavaganza!, only this time in their most substantial role to date where they are voiced by Fred Tatasciore while still being anthropomorphic as usual.

== Plot ==
Bugs is stranded in a barrel in the ocean, reading Esquire magazine and singing.

On the island of 'Bingzi-Bangzi – Land of the Ferocious Apes', Mrs. Gruesome Gorilla is sad that she does not have any children. She spots Bugs floating by and takes the barrel and Bugs, thinking of Bugs as a baby gorilla. He explains he is a rabbit but she begins to cry. Bugs shares with the audience: "That's my soft spot—dames crying" - and figures he can "go along with a gag" to be her baby.

Mrs. Gruesome presents Bugs to Mr. Gruesome and Bugs acts like an ape. Mr. Gruesome is not happy about having a baby in the house and takes Bugs out for 'a walk', while Mrs. Gruesome makes dinner.

Mr. Gruesome is rough with his "child" and Bugs gets back at Mr. Gruesome by hitting him over the head with a shovel. This enrages the gorilla. Bugs goes toe-to-toe with him, then brings a coconut down on Mr. Gruesome's head. A chase ensues until Bugs is trapped on a cliff edge. He gives up and allows Mr. Gruesome to catch him. However, the gorilla is exhausted and a mere puff of breath from Bugs causes him to collapse. Bugs jumps up and catches a hanging branch, playing an ape as iris-out.

== Music ==
- "Down Where the Trade Winds Play", uncredited, by Cliff Friend, lyrics by Charles Tobias
- "Dinner Music for a Pack of Hungry Cannibals", uncredited, by Raymond Scott
- "Someone's Rocking My Dreamboat", uncredited, by Leon René, Otis René and Emerson Scott
- "Sweet Dreams, Sweetheart", uncredited, by Ray Noble
- "Congo", uncredited, by M.K. Jerome
- "Goombay Drum", uncredited, by Charles Lofthouse, Schuyler Knowlton and Stanley Adams
- "Ahí, viene la conga", uncredited, by Raúl Valdespí
- "Hey, Doc", uncredited, music by Edgar M. Sampson
- "Valurile Dunarii (Danube Waves)", uncredited, music by Iosif Ivanovici

== Reception ==
Animation historian Mike Mallory writes "Bugs Bunny is at his brashiest and most fearless in Gorilla My Dreams, a drivingly funny romp staged with breathless energy and flawless timing by director Robert McKimson... The ensuing grudge match between the roaring, angry would-be father and his recalcitrant, long-eared "baby", set to the raucously jazzy music of Carl Stalling and Raymond Scott, is prime Warner Bros. cartooning."

== Home media ==
Gorilla My Dreams is available, uncut and restored, on Looney Tunes Golden Collection: Volume 2 (Disc 1) and on Looney Tunes Platinum Collection: Volume 3 (Disc 1).

== See also ==
- Bugs Bunny filmography
- Looney Tunes and Merrie Melodies filmography (1940–1949)

Preceded by Slick Hare	Bugs Bunny Cartoons; 1948	Succeeded by A Feather in His Hare
