= Porky's Naughty Nephew =

1938 film by Robert Clampett

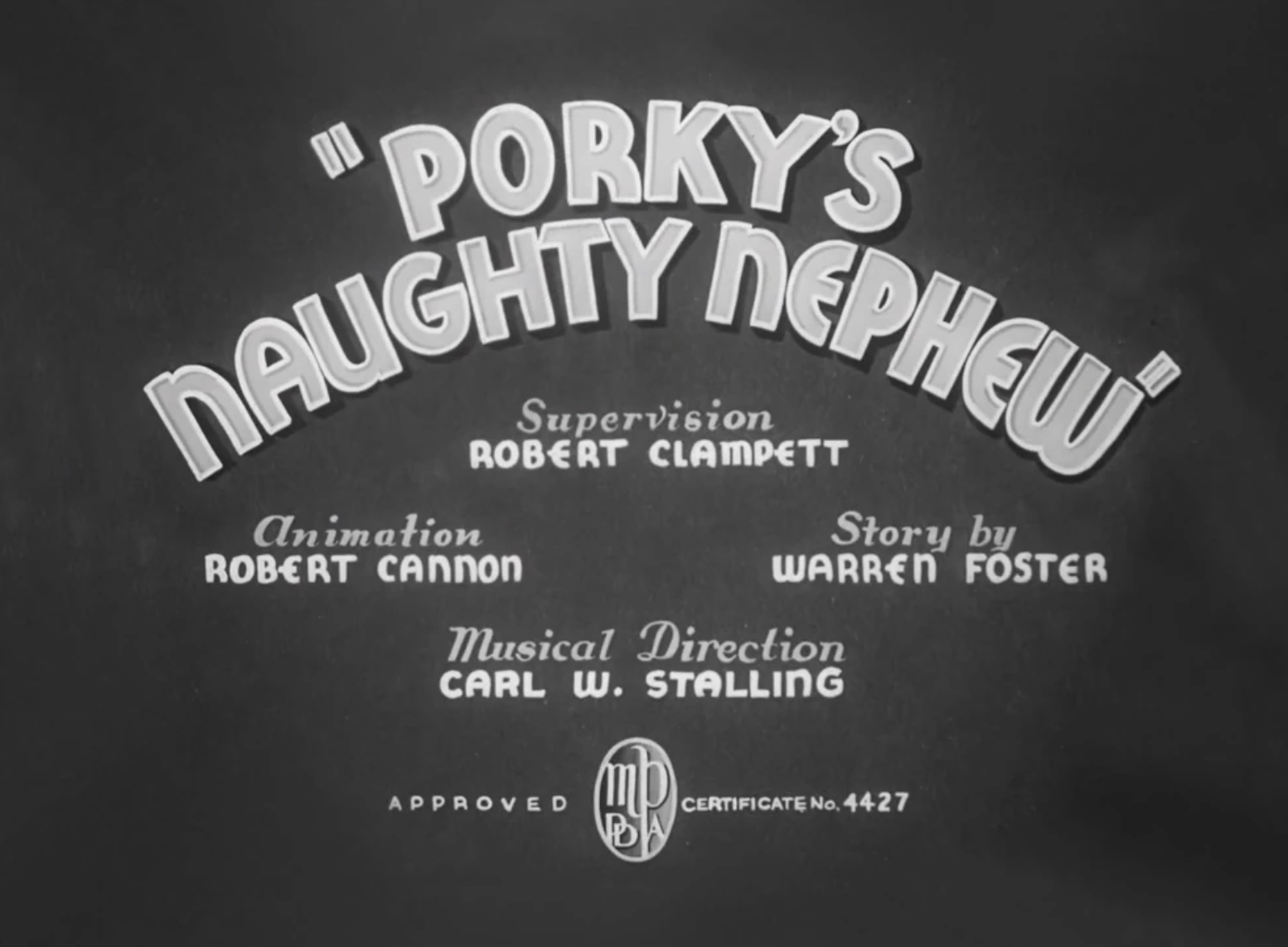
- Title card
- Directed by: Robert Clampett
- Story by: Warren Foster
- Produced by: Leon Schlesinger
- Starring: Mel Blanc
- Music by: Carl W. Stalling
- Animation by: Robert Cannon
- Color process: Black and white
- Production company: Leon Schlesinger Productions
- Distributed by: Warner Bros. Pictures; The Vitaphone Corporation
- Release date: October 15, 1938
- Running time: 7 min
- Country: United States
- Language: English

Porky's Naughty Nephew is a 1938 American animated comedy short film directed by Robert Clampett. The short was released on October 15, 1938. It is part of the Looney Tunes series and the 47th cartoon to feature Porky Pig.

== Plot ==
At a beach, swimmers prepare for a competition while Porky arrives with his nephew Pinky in an attempt to babysit him. Porky tries to set up his umbrella on a sleeping bulldog under the sand, who surprises him and knocks him next to where Pinky is playing. Pinky proves to be a nuisance by quickly hitting Porky with a shovel. Porky almost discovers Pinky's actions but blames it on a baby weasel. He tries to confiscate the weasel's shovels, only for the weasel to retrieve increasingly larger shovels and knock him out with the largest shovel. Pinky is jealous and attempts to smack the weasel, but hits Porky instead.

Pinky finds a shallow pool and decides it would be funny to pretend to drown while calling for help. Porky tries to save him and gets a starfish stuck on his face, which Pinky removes to his amusement. Pinky then dumps sand on Porky with a truck, when Daffy Duck announces the start of the swimming race. Porky enthusiastically joins in, but proves to be the only fair competitor, alongside a caricature of Eddie Cantor, as the other swimmers return to retrieve various tools to cheat. The only cheater whose strategy works is Daffy with a water wheel, while other swimmers either drown or are unable to keep up. Pinky helps Porky win by scaring him with a fake shark, until he accidentally retrieves a real shark to the duo's horror.

== Home media ==
Porky's Naughty Nephew is available on disc 3 of the Porky Pig 101 DVD set.

== See also ==
- Porky Pig filmography
- Looney Tunes and Merrie Melodies filmography (1930–1939)
