= Water, Water Every Hare =

1952 cartoon by Chuck Jones

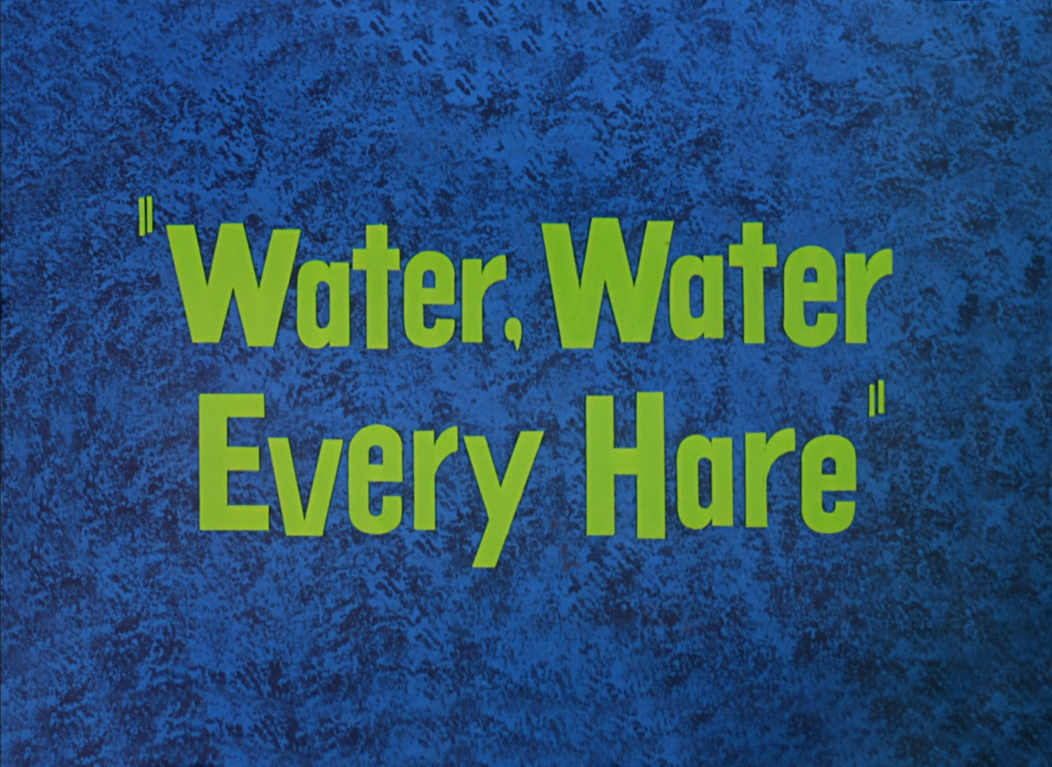
- Title card
- Directed by: Charles M. Jones
- Story by: Michael Maltese
- Starring: Mel Blanc; John T. Smith (uncredited)
- Music by: Carl Stalling
- Animation by: Ben Washam; Ken Harris; Phil Monroe; Lloyd Vaughan; Richard Thompson; Harry Love
- Layouts by: Robert Gribbroek
- Backgrounds by: Philip DeGuard
- Color process: Technicolor
- Production company: Warner Bros. Cartoons
- Distributed by: Warner Bros. Pictures; The Vitaphone Corporation
- Release date: April 19, 1952 (U.S.)
- Running time: 7:28
- Language: English

Water, Water Every Hare is a 1952 Warner Bros. Looney Tunes cartoon directed by Chuck Jones. The cartoon was released on April 19, 1952 and stars Bugs Bunny. The short is a return to the themes of the 1946 cartoon Hair-Raising Hare and brings the monster Gossamer (referred to as "Rudolph") back to the screen.

The title is a pun on the line "Water, water, everywhere / Nor any drop to drink" from the poem The Rime of the Ancient Mariner, by Samuel Taylor Coleridge. The cartoon is available on Disc 1 of the Looney Tunes Golden Collection: Volume 1.

== Plot ==
After being displaced by a storm, Bugs Bunny finds himself in the castle of a mad scientist (a caricature of Boris Karloff), who needs a brain for his robot. Bugs awakens under a mummy, panics, and flees. The frustrated mad scientist sends his monster Rudolph to retrieve him, promising a reward. Bugs evades capture by impersonating a hairdresser and uses dynamite as curlers, leaving Rudolph bald.

Enraged, Rudolph chases Bugs to a chemical storage room. Bugs uses vanishing fluid to turn invisible and torments Rudolph, eventually shrinking him with reducing oil. The tiny Rudolph leaves through a mouse hole, throws out the mouse, and closes the door which sports the message "I quit!". The mouse says in response to this "I quit too!", as he tosses a bottle of hard liquor away.

Invisible Bugs celebrates, but the mad scientist makes him visible again with "Hare Restorer". While noting that he shouldn't have sent a monster to do a man's job, the mad scientist demands Bugs' brain. Bugs refuses and the scientist accidentally releases ether fumes, incapacitating them both. In a slow-motion chase, Bugs trips the scientist, who falls asleep.

Bugs, still in slow motion, prances away but trips and falls asleep in a stream that returns him to his flooded hole. Waking up underwater, he thinks it was a nightmare until the miniature Rudolph rows by quoting "Oh yeah? That's what you think!", leaving Bugs bewildered.

== Cast ==
- Mel Blanc as Bugs Bunny, Gossamer ("Rudolph") and Mouse
- John T. Smith as Mad Scientist (uncredited)

== See also ==
- Hair-Raising Hare
- List of Bugs Bunny cartoons
- Looney Tunes and Merrie Melodies filmography (1950–1959)

Preceded by 14 Carrot Rabbit	Bugs Bunny Cartoons; 1952	Succeeded by The Hasty Hare
