= The Bugs Bunny Show =

Animated television anthology series

- Also known as: The Bugs Bunny/Road Runner Hour; The Bugs Bunny/Road Runner Show; The Bugs Bunny/Looney Tunes Comedy Hour; The Bugs Bunny & Tweety Show; Bugs Bunny and Friends
- Genre: Animation; Anthology
- Based on: Looney Tunes and Merrie Melodies by Warner Bros.; Bugs Bunny by Tex Avery Chuck Jones Bob Givens Robert McKimson
- Directed by: Chuck Jones; Friz Freleng; Robert McKimson
- Voices of: Mel Blanc; June Foray; Stan Freberg; Hal Smith
- Theme music composer: Mack David & Jerry Livingston (1960–2000); Steve Zuckerman (1984–85)
- Opening theme: "This Is It" (1960–1984, 1988–2000, 2021–present); "It's Cartoon Gold" (1984–1985)
- Country of origin: United States
- Original language: English

Production
- Executive producers: David H. DePatie; Friz Freleng; William L. Hendricks; Peter Morales; Andrew Stein; Hal Geer; Steven S. Greene; Kathleen Helppie-Shipley; Jean H. MacCurdy; Lorri A. Bond
- Producers: Friz Freleng; Chuck Jones
- Running time: Various; 22–66 minutes
- Production companies: Warner Bros. Television; Shorts: Warner Bros. Cartoons; Bumpers: Warner Bros. Cartoons (1960–1963); Warner Bros. Animation (1980–2000)

Original release
- Network: ABC (1960–1968, 1973–1975, 1985–2000); CBS (1968–1973, 1975–1985)
- Release: October 11, 1960 – September 2, 2000

Related
- The Porky Pig Show; The Road Runner Show

The Bugs Bunny Show is an American animated anthology television series hosted by Bugs Bunny that is mainly composed of theatrical Looney Tunes and Merrie Melodies cartoons released by Warner Bros. between 1948 and 1969. The show originally debuted as a primetime half-hour program on ABC in 1960, featuring three theatrical Looney Tunes cartoons with new linking sequences produced by the Warner Bros. Cartoons staff.

After two seasons, The Bugs Bunny Show moved to Saturday mornings, where it aired in various formats for nearly four decades. The show's title and length changed regularly over the years, as did the network: both ABC and CBS broadcast versions of The Bugs Bunny Show. In 2000, the series, by then known as The Bugs Bunny & Tweety Show, was canceled after the Looney Tunes and Merrie Melodies libraries became the exclusive property of the Cartoon Network family of cable TV networks in the United States.

== Broadcast and format history ==
=== The Bugs Bunny Show in prime time, 1960–1962 ===
The original Bugs Bunny Show debuted on ABC prime time in the United States on October 11, 1960, airing on Tuesdays at 7:30 PM ET, under the sponsorship of General Foods (Post cereals, Tang, etc.). Newly-produced linking segments were done for each episode by the Warner Bros. animation staff. Chuck Jones and Friz Freleng produced, directed and created the storyboards for the earliest of these, with Robert McKimson later taking over the direction while Jones and Freleng continued producing and writing. The wraparounds were produced in color, although the original broadcasts of the show were in black-and-white. A total of 52 episodes were made.

Rather than display the full Warner Bros. logo and opening title/credits sequence of each cartoon shown in each episode (as shown in the original theatrical versions and could take up to 20 seconds), new title cards were created to begin each cartoon and displayed for only about five seconds over a newly composed musical cue; the card omitted the Warner Bros. logo and any detailed credits of the animators, simply featuring the title of the cartoon in bold letters on a plain background, the main character of the cartoon standing off to one side and the copyright notice of the cartoon rendered in a smaller font at the bottom, before cutting directly to the opening scene of the cartoon. These cuts were sometimes awkward depending on how the original opening sequence was animated. A general credits line was shown at the end of each full episode: "Stories, Animation, layouts, and backgrounds: Members of Motion Picture Screen Cartoonists Local 839." (The Looney Tunes and Merrie Melodies cartoons syndicated to local stations as a package, beginning in the 1950s, generally retained the original opening title sequences as shown in theaters. The current revival of the show on MeTV also uses the original theatrical title cards.)

The show's theme song was "This Is It", written by Mack David and Jerry Livingston ("Overture/curtain, lights/this is it/the night of nights..."). The opening title sequence, animated by Freleng unit animator Gerry Chiniquy, features Bugs and Daffy Duck performing the song in unison. For the final chorus, a lineup of Looney Tunes characters joins Bugs and Daffy onstage (Porky Pig, however, is absent from the procession, although Porky had a spin-off show based on the original Bugs Bunny Show 4 years later titled The Porky Pig Show which aired on ABC from 1964 to 1967).

The Bugs Bunny Show proved beneficial to the Warner Bros. cartoon staff, as it allowed the studio to remain open despite the shrinking market for theatrical animated shorts. The final first-run episode of the original Bugs Bunny Show aired on August 7, 1962, and the Warner Bros. animation studio closed the following spring.

=== The move to Saturday mornings, 1962–1985 ===
ABC began re-running The Bugs Bunny Show on Saturday mornings in August 1962 until September 1967, when it was moved to Sunday mornings for the remainder of its run. The series was rerun in color beginning in 1965 and remained on ABC until September 1968. At this point, the series switched to CBS, where it was combined with The Road Runner Show (which had aired on CBS since 1966) to create The Bugs Bunny/Road Runner Hour. The standard Bugs Bunny Show opening and the announcer's introduction of Bugs Bunny ("that Oscar-winning rabbit!") were directly followed by the rabbit's saying, "...and also starring my fast feathered friend, the Road Runner", after which The Road Runner Show's theme was played. The Bugs Bunny/Road Runner Hour combined re-edited bridging sequences from both shows to link the seven cartoons featured in each episode. The bridging sequences would be edited further in later versions of the Bugs Bunny/Road Runner Hour.

In 1971, The Road Runner Show moved to ABC and a reconstituted half-hour Bugs Bunny Show aired on CBS, featuring re-edited versions of the bridging sequences and a different grouping of cartoons. In 1973, The Bugs Bunny Show returned to ABC for two seasons, only for CBS to re-acquire both shows and bring back The Bugs Bunny/Road Runner Hour in 1975. In 1976, Sylvester and Tweety were featured in their own Sylvester and Tweety Show for one year, necessitating the removal of most of the Tweety and/or Sylvester cartoons on Bugs Bunny/Road Runner that season. Also that year, a weekly half-hour prime-time edition of The Bugs Bunny/Road Runner Show briefly aired on CBS' Tuesday night schedule, from April through June.

The Bugs Bunny/Road Runner Hour became The Bugs Bunny/Road Runner Show in November 1977, after CBS added another half-hour to the runtime. In 1981, a companion Sylvester & Tweety, Daffy and Speedy Show was added to the CBS schedule, which included a number of later cartoons produced by a reestablished Warner Bros. Cartoons studio from 1967 to 1969. The following year, this new companion series was canceled and its cartoons were incorporated into The Bugs Bunny/Road Runner Show, which was broadcast as two separate hour-long programs on Saturday mornings (for the second program, the show's opening titles were re-animated). In 1983, CBS returned the show to 90 minutes and the bridging sequences were dropped. The following year, the "This Is It" opening was jettisoned altogether; a new title sequence (created from clips of the cartoons) and new theme song ("It's Cartoon Gold"), composed by Steve Zuckerman with lyrics by John Klawitter, introduced the show.

=== Final Saturday morning years, 1985–2000 ===
CBS gave up the rights to broadcast the Warner Bros. cartoons following the 1984–1985 season, and as a result, the show moved back to ABC, where it became The Bugs Bunny/Looney Tunes Comedy Hour. Cartoons featuring Tweety or Speedy Gonzales were not broadcast on ABC during the 1985–86 season, the latter presumably due to objections toward Mexican stereotypes. The following year, however, Tweety cartoons were added to the program, which was reduced to a half-hour and renamed The Bugs Bunny & Tweety Show. Beginning with its third season, The Bugs Bunny & Tweety Show was expanded to a full hour and the original "This Is It" theme was reintroduced with similar animation as the original, accompanied by the introductory sequence introduced in 1982. Another version of the "This Is It" opening sequence was done in 1992, with different character animations.

Though the program did not qualify for the educational/informational designation, it nonetheless remained on Saturday mornings after the new designation debuted in 1996, one of the few non-E/I programs to survive the rules changes. The previous year, ABC was bought by The Walt Disney Company, and The Bugs Bunny & Tweety Show was the only non-Disney cartoon to remain on the lineup, due to their contract not being up yet, and was in the first few years of the Disney's One Saturday Morning block starting in 1997 (with the Disney logo omitted from the blocks bumpers during the show). The program was often paired with ABC's in-house Schoolhouse Rock! shorts during this time.

The hour-long Bugs Bunny & Tweety Show remained on the air until 1999, when it was again reduced to a half-hour. In 2000, Warner Bros. made the Looney Tunes and Merrie Melodies film library exclusive to Cartoon Network, which Time Warner owned as part of the purchase of Turner Broadcasting in 1996. As a result, The Bugs Bunny Show ended its nearly four-decade-long network run, one of the longest runs in the history of United States network television. Outside of cartoons in the public domain, Warner Bros. cartoons would not return to American broadcast television until the 2021 debut of Toon In with Me on MeTV, along with a companion Saturday morning block.

== Legacy ==
This show is credited for keeping the Warner Bros. cartoons made during the Golden Age of American animation a part of the American consciousness. The show ran for almost four decades, helping inspire animators, comedians, historians, and others who watched Saturday morning television.

The "This Is It" song's fame is such that it has been used elsewhere, such as in the Canadian province of Ontario where it was used in a TV commercial promoting the various performing arts tourist attractions, where artists of various disciplines sing separate lines of the song.

When Warner Bros. released their video series "Golden Jubilee" in 1985, featuring the classic cartoons, the opening sequence shows Taz maniacally riding a motorcycle down a city street chased by a police car. He makes a sharp turn into a theater, where the rest of the Looney Tune Characters are performing to the Bugs Bunny Show tune.

Beginning in January 2021, the original "This Is It" opening sequence was included in Bugs Bunny and Friends, part of MeTV's Saturday Morning Cartoons block.

In the Seinfeld episode "The Opera", as Jerry and Elaine are waiting outside the opera house, Jerry starts singing "This is it" to pass the time to which Elaine laments to him by saying, "You know, it is so sad that all of your knowledge of high culture comes from Bugs Bunny cartoons."

== Animated sequences produced for the show ==
A series of short animated scenes were produced for the show, featured "linking" moments during the main theater setting of the show. Some of these scenes included:

- The opening teaser showed Bugs and Daffy performing a duet about the start of the cartoon show; as they sing it, in the background marching and crossing the stage are some of co-stars' regulars: Tweety; Speedy Gonzales; Pepé Le Pew; Sylvester the Cat; the Road Runner; Hippety Hopper; Yosemite Sam; Elmer Fudd; Wile E. Coyote; Foghorn Leghorn.
- A frustrated Daffy bickering on stage with Bugs. Daffy declares, "Last week you said you were going to introduce me next week!" Bugs replies, "Right...but this isn't next week, is it?" Daffy trips himself up and replies, "You're doggone tootin' it isn't! This is this week! And next week is uhhh...ummm...sheesh!"
- A barking sheepdog wanders into the theater, saying "Which way did he go? Where's the little bunny I saw on TV last week?" Daffy, at this time, has dressed up in a rabbit costume and is on stage pretending to be Bugs. The sheepdog pounces upon Daffy and exclaims, "At last, at last! I have caught a bunny rabbit!"
- Bugs entertains the audience by playing a guitar. An angry Yosemite Sam barges in the theater shouting, "Can't ya see I'm tryin' to sleep?!?", snatches the guitar from Bugs, and snaps all of its strings but one.
- Bugs demonstrates some cartoon physics, including slow-motion, fast-speed and "vibrating to a stop."

The show's title sequences and some of these linking material scenes from the original Bugs Bunny Show are included as bonus features on each volume of the Looney Tunes Golden Collection DVD collection (with the exception of Volume 6). As the original color negatives were cut up by CBS and ABC to create later versions of the show, the linking sequences are presented on DVD using a combination of footage from both what's left of the color negatives (some of which were used in later incarnations, thus helping to preserve them) and the black-and-white ABC broadcast prints prepared in the early 1960s.

On the Looney Tunes Golden Collection: Volume 2, the opening to the Bugs Bunny/Road Runner Show (with the announcer calling it the Bugs Bunny/Road Runner Hour) and two openings to the Bugs Bunny and Tweety Show (the 1988 opening and the 1992 opening) were released as special features.

In 2009, an episode of the Bugs Bunny Show in color was released on the Saturday Morning Cartoons 1960s Volume 2 set. Saturday Morning Cartoons 1970s Volume 2 includes an episode of the Bugs Bunny/Road Runner Show.

Historian George Feltenstein of Warner Archive confirmed on The Extras Podcast episode on March 20, 2025 that The Bugs Bunny Show is actively being restored and remastered by the Warner Bros. Preservation Department for a home media release in the future. Him and Jerry Beck are overseeing the preservation amongst the Looney Tunes Collector's Vault releases. Feltenstein describes the process as "starting with the black and white fine grains", which were already preserved, and then going over the camera negatives to "see what's missing" for the color negatives to preserve as much as possible despite being butchered years ago. While the cartoons have already been restored in the past, the bridging sequences are the main priority to recreate the half-hour show. It would take at least two years depending on the conditions of the film negatives and "micro surgery" process.

== List of original primetime episodes ==
=== Season 1 (1960–61) ===
#	1st cartoon	2nd cartoon	3rd cartoon	Original air date	Directed by	Prod. No.	U.S. households (in millions)
1	Rabbit Every Monday	A Mouse Divided	Tree for Two	October 11, 1960	Chuck Jones and Friz Freleng	#1595	6.92
Bugs introduces the Looney Tunes gang.
2	Putty Tat Trouble	Wise Quackers	Speedy Gonzales	October 18, 1960	Chuck Jones and Friz Freleng	#1589	N/A
Rocky and Mugsy plan on taking over the TV Business.
3	Wild Over You	Go Fly a Kit	Mouse Warming	October 25, 1960	Chuck Jones and Friz Freleng	#1587	6.74
Pepe speaks about Paris, the City of Love.
4	To Itch His Own	Gee Whiz-z-z-z-z-z-z	Whoa, Be Gone!	November 1, 1960	Chuck Jones and Friz Freleng	#1591	6.74
Master of ceremonies Bugs gets shoved aside by Wile E. Coyote and the Road Runner.
5	Canary Row	Knights Must Fall	For Scent-imental Reasons	November 8, 1960	Friz Freleng Co-Directed by: Maurice Noble	#1575	5.28
Daffy is so desperate to appear on the show he dresses up as a Hawaiian, a musketeer, and in knight's armor.
6	Long-Haired Hare	Sandy Claws	Mouse Wreckers	November 15, 1960	Friz Freleng Co-Directed by: Gerry Chiniquy	#1576	8.05
Daffy plays the drums and Bugs imitates "Frankie doing an imitation of Ricky imitating Elvis." Yosemite Sam trying to sleep, appears and destroys Bugs and Daffy's instruments.
7	Bully for Bugs	Tweety's SOS	One Froggy Evening	November 22, 1960	Chuck Jones Co-Directed by: Maurice Noble	#1580	8.59
Daffy, disguised as Bugs, attempts to host the show- but is chased by the sheepdog who thinks he's a rabbit. Daffy finds he cannot remove the bunny suit.
8	My Bunny Lies Over the Sea	Scaredy Cat	Scent-imental Romeo	November 29, 1960	Maurice Noble	#1579	8.32
Daffy wants to host the show and expels all others including Pepe, Elmer and Bugs.
9	Bunker Hill Bunny	Each Dawn I Crow	Golden Yeggs	December 6, 1960	Friz Freleng Co-Directed by: Hawley Pratt	#1581	8.63
Tweety is host, but in order to be safe from Sylvester, Bugs hangs his cage from the stage ceiling.
10	Which Is Witch	Mouse Mazurka	Kit for Cat	December 13, 1960	Chuck Jones and Friz Freleng Co-Directed by: Hawley Pratt	#1584	8.00
Yosemite Sam is again after Bugs, so he comes to see the "screwy rabbit's" show.
11	Two's a Crowd	All a Bir-r-r-d	The Hasty Hare	December 20, 1960	Chuck Jones and Friz Freleng Co-Directed by: Abe Levitow and Maurice Noble	#1585	N/A
This week's host, Porky, is beset by Charlie Dog looking for a master.
12	What's Up, Doc?	Early to Bet	Pop 'Im Pop	December 27, 1960	Robert McKimson	#1586	8.25
When Bugs presents Barnyard Dawg as the host, but Foghorn pushes him aside and introduces the cartoons himself.
13	A-Lad-In His Lamp	Dog Gone South	A Fractured Leghorn	January 3, 1961	Robert McKimson	#1588	8.39
Hosts are Sylvester and Sylvester Junior, who encounter that "giant mouse", Hippety Hopper, backstage.
14	Ant Pasted	The Fair-Haired Hare	I Gopher You	January 10, 1961	Chuck Jones and Friz Freleng	#1590	9.19
Elmer is host and tries to sing.
15	Rocket Squad	Daffy Dilly	Drip-Along Daffy	January 17, 1961	Friz Freleng Co-Directed by: Robert Transon and Maurice Noble	#1592	8.40
Bugs presents an all-Daffy tribute, in which Mamma Bear performs "I'm Just Wild About Daffy".
16	The Leghorn Blows at Midnight	Hot Cross Bunny	His Bitter Half	January 24, 1961	Robert McKimson Co-Directed by: Maurice Noble	#1593	9.66
Foghorn presents Miss Prissy, old-time actress, who re-enacts her favorite stage roles.
17	Lovelorn Leghorn	Who's Kitten Who	The Windblown Hare	January 31, 1961	Robert McKimson	#1594	9.62
A twist on Duck Amuck – an unseen animator draws Foghorn with Rock Hudson's body. Foghorn gets even, lassoing the animator, Daffy, and beats him up.
18	High Diving Hare	Don't Give Up the Sheep	Stooge for a Mouse	February 7, 1961	Chuck Jones and Friz Freleng Co-Directed by: Hawley Pratt	#1596	10.37
Jose and Manuel from Mexicali Shmoes are heckled by Speedy in the audience.
19	Mutiny on the Bunny	Punch Trunk	Fast and Furry-ous	February 14, 1961	Chuck Jones and Friz Freleng Co-Directed by: Abe Levitow and Maurice Noble	#1597	9.47
Bugs demonstrates how to draw a cartoon...and how to draw Daffy from a dumbbell.
20	Rabbit of Seville	The Scarlet Pumpernickel	Stop! Look! And Hasten!	February 21, 1961	Friz Freleng	#1598	9.52
A program on music with interruptions by hunter Elmer.
21	Hillbilly Hare	Hippety Hopper	You Were Never Duckier	February 28, 1961	Chuck Jones and Friz Freleng	#1599	9.29
Mac and Tosh, the Goofy Gophers, host the show.
22	The Turn-Tale Wolf	Paying the Piper	Beanstalk Bunny	March 7, 1961	Robert McKimson	#1600	7.79
Sylvester hosts and tells his son, Junior, some fairy tales.
23	Big House Bunny	Canned Feud	Home Tweet Home	March 14, 1961	Chuck Jones and Friz Freleng	#1601	8.86
Mac and Tosh spend their time arguing while Bugs introduces the cartoons.
24	Mississippi Hare	Terrier Stricken	Cheese Chasers	March 21, 1961	Chuck Jones and Friz Freleng Co-Directed by: Abe Levitow	#1602	8.21
Pepe hosts the show. Yosemite Sam tries to use Taz to get rid of him, but his scent defeats them.
25	Henhouse Henery	Curtain Razor	Devil May Hare	March 28, 1961	Robert McKimson	#1603	8.21
Bugs introduces Daffy as the host, but Daffy is backstage being chased by Taz.
26	Hare We Go	The Foghorn Leghorn	Little Red Rodent Hood	April 4, 1961	Friz Freleng and Chuck Jones	#1604	9.38
Rocky and Mugsy take over the show at gunpoint.

=== Season 2 (1961–62) ===
NOTE: The bridging sequences for the episodes "Bad Time Story", "Ball Point Puns", "Do or Diet", "The Honey-Mousers", and "A Star is Bored" were included as bonus features on various volumes of the Looney Tunes Golden Collection DVD sets.

#	Title	Cartoons included	Original air date	Directed by	Prod. No.	U.S. households (in millions)
1	Bad Time Story	Bewitched Bunny/Robin Hood Daffy/Tweety and the Beanstalk	October 10, 1961	Chuck Jones and Friz Freleng	#1624	6.94
Bugs reads and reenacts fairy-tales.
2	Satain's Waitin'	Hare Trimmed/Roman Legion Hare/Sahara Hare	October 17, 1961	Chuck Jones and Friz Freleng	#1625	N/A
An elaboration on the short Devil's Feud Cake, Yosemite Sam dies and goes to hell but the devil will spare him if he brings back Bugs.
3	Daffy Doodling	Hoppy Go Lucky/Lumber Jerks/Weasel While You Work	October 24, 1961	Robert McKimson	#1626	6.99
Daffy outwits Bugs for the master of ceremonies job.
4	Omni-Puss	Mouse-Taken Identity/Kiss Me Cat/Heaven Scent	October 31, 1961	Chuck Jones and Friz Freleng Co-Directed by: Maurice Noble	#1627	4.50
Bugs lectures about cats.
5	Tired and Feathered	Ready, Set, Zoom!/Two Crows from Tacos/Snow Business	November 7, 1961	Chuck Jones and Friz Freleng	#1628	6.47
Bugs speaks about birds.
6	Man's Best Friend	Sheep Ahoy/Chow Hound/Pappy's Puppy	November 14, 1961	Chuck Jones and Friz Freleng	#1642	7.69
Bugs speaks about dogs.
7	Ball Point Puns	Duck! Rabbit! Duck!/Claws for Alarm/Cracked Quack	November 21, 1961	Chuck Jones and Friz Freleng	#1629	7.22
Penelope and Penbrooke (the red and black pens) perform for the audience.
8	The Unfinished Symphony	Pizzicato Pussycat/Baton Bunny/Three Little Bops	November 28, 1961	Chuck Jones and Friz Freleng Co-Directed by Maurice Noble and Robert Tronson	#1630	8.11
Bugs talks about music.
9	Prison to Prison	Deduce, You Say/The Hole Idea/Bugsy and Mugsy	December 5, 1961	Chuck Jones and Friz Freleng Co-Directed by Hawley Pratt	#1631	6.85
Bugs, as Alfred Hitchcock, speaks about crime.
10	Go Man Go	There Auto Be a Law/Wild Wife/No Parking Hare	December 12, 1961	Robert McKimson	#1632	7.88
Bugs lectures about men, women and life in general.
11	I'm Just Wild About Hare	Stork Naked/Going! Going! Gosh!/Touche and Go	December 19, 1961	Chuck Jones and Friz Freleng Co-directed by: Maurice Noble and Tom Ray	#1633	N/A
Bugs has overslept, so he hosts the show from his home.
12	Stage Couch	Gift Wrapped/Tweet Dreams/Tweety's Circus/A Street Cat Named Sylvester	December 26, 1961	Chuck Jones and Friz Freleng Co-directed by Hawley Pratt	#1634	7.55
Sylvester tells psychiatrist Dr. Bugs of his obsession with Tweety.
13	Do or Diet	Bedevilled Rabbit/Stupor Duck/Little Boy Boo	January 16, 1962	Robert McKimson	#1635	8.23
Bugs talks about a carrot diet while heckling Taz to do the same.
14	Hare Brush	Feline Frame-Up/Much Ado About Nutting/Duck Amuck	January 23, 1962	Chuck Jones and Friz Freleng Co-directed by Maurice Noble and Ken Harris	#1636	7.50
Bugs introduces Harry the Brush (from Duck Amuck) who explains his role in animation.
15	Is This a Life?	14 Carrot Rabbit/Robot Rabbit/High Diving Hare	February 13, 1962	Chuck Jones and Friz Freleng	#1637	7.50
Bugs' life is reviewed with visits from his friends and foes.
16	De-Duck-Tive Story	Boston Quackie/The Super Snooper/Dime to Retire	February 20, 1962	Robert McKimson	#1638	7.94
Features Daffy in his greatest detective roles.
17	The Astro-Nuts	Duck Dodgers in the 24½th Century/Jumpin' Jupiter/Hare-Way to the Stars	March 13, 1962	Chuck Jones and Friz Freleng Co-Directed by Maurice Noble and Ken Harris	#1639	8.33
Porky, in a space suit, introduces sci-fi cartoons.
18	Vera's Cruise	Dr. Jerkyl's Hide/Tweety's SOS/A Pizza Tweety Pie/All a Bir-r-r-rd	March 20, 1962	Chuck Jones and Friz Freleng	#1640	7.64
Sylvester tells of his recent travels through Europe in pursuit of Tweety.
19	Foreign Legion Leghorn	The EGGcited Rooster/Of Rice and Hen/Feather Dusted	June 19, 1962	Robert McKimson	#1641	N/A
Foghorn is an inept soldier in the Foreign Legion. He explains to his sergeant what made him that way.
20	Watch My Line	A Waggily Tale/Scrambled Aches/Rabbit Rampage	June 26, 1962	Chuck Jones and Friz Freleng Co-directed by Hawley Pratt	#1643	N/A
An elaboration on Rabbit Rampage, in which Bugs suffers various indignities from a mysterious animator, who turns out to be Elmer.
21	What's Up Dog?	Awful Orphan/Don't Axe Me/Mixed Master	July 3, 1962	Robert McKimson	#1644	N/A
A continuation of "Man's Best Friend", featuring more dog related stories.
22	The Cat's Bah	The Cat's Bah/Frigid Hare/Little Beau Pepe	July 10, 1962	Chuck Jones and Friz Freleng	#1645	N/A
Pepe recalls the results of a broken romance.
23	No Business Like Slow Business	Red Riding Hoodwinked/Barbary Coast Bunny/Double or Mutton	July 17, 1962	Chuck Jones and Friz Freleng	#1646	N/A
Slowpoke Rodriguez and Speedy are co-hosts.
24	The Honey-Mousers	Cheese It, the Cat!/Lighthouse Mouse/The Honey-Mousers	July 24, 1962	Robert McKimson	#1647	N/A
Bugs invites the audience backstage, offers them drinks and invites them to watch a high-rated TV show called The Honey-Mousers
25	A Star is Bored	Catty Cornered/There They Go-Go-Go!/A Star is Bored	July 31, 1962	Chuck Jones and Friz Freleng Co-directed by Maurice Noble and Tom Ray	#1648	N/A
Bugs shows the audience how cartoons are made, telling the audience "Confidentially, I do Mel Blanc's voice."
26	A Tale of Two Kitties	The Slap-Hoppy Mouse/Gonzales' Tamales/Cats A-Weigh!	August 7, 1962	Robert McKimson	#1649	N/A
Sylvester talks about how to take care of your kids, while Junior explains how the stories really happened.

== Broadcasts ==
Prime time:

- The Bugs Bunny Show, October 11, 1960 – August 7, 1962 (ABC)

Saturday mornings:

- The Bugs Bunny Show, April 7, 1962 – September 8, 1968 (in color starting September 10, 1966) (ABC)
- The Bugs Bunny/Road Runner Hour, September 14, 1968 – September 4, 1971 (CBS)
- The Bugs Bunny Show, September 11, 1971 – September 1, 1973 (CBS)
- The Bugs Bunny Show, September 8, 1973 - August 30, 1975 (ABC)
- The Bugs Bunny/Road Runner Hour, September 6, 1975 – November 12, 1977 (CBS)
- The Bugs Bunny/Road Runner Show, November 19, 1977 – September 7, 1985 (CBS)
- The Bugs Bunny/Looney Tunes Comedy Hour, September 7, 1985 – September 6, 1986 (ABC)
- The Bugs Bunny & Tweety Show, September 13, 1986 – September 2, 2000 (ABC)

In Canada, reruns of The Bugs Bunny and Tweety Show were aired on the channels Teletoon and Teletoon's sister channel, Teletoon Retro (until 2015 when Teletoon Retro signed off). Prior to Teletoon and Teletoon Retro, CBC Television (1960–1975) and Global Television Network (1978–1982, 1990–2000) aired the show. In Australia, episodes of the show were divided between three networks, with most episodes aired on Nine Network, and some episodes divided between Network Ten, and Seven Network since its debut. In Poland, the show aired on TVP1 from 1979 till 1980 and again from 1991 till 1992. In Asia, the program was aired in Japan and South Korea in the early 1960s and also aired on ABS-CBN and RPN in the Philippines, it was also aired on TPI (now MNCTV) from the mid-1990s to early 2000s and RCTI during 2000s in Indonesia as well.

== Credits ==
- Senior Directors: Chuck Jones, Friz Freleng, Robert McKimson
- Co-directors: Hawley Pratt, Gerry Chiniquy, Art Davis, Abe Levitow, Maurice Noble, Alex Lovy, David Detiege, Rudy Larriva, Tom Ray
- Stories, Animation, layouts, and backgrounds: Members of Motion Picture Screen Cartoonists Local 839
- Music: Carl W. Stalling, Milt Franklyn, John Seely, William Lava, William L. Hendricks, Walter Greene, Eugene Poddany, Doug Goodwin, Rob Walsh, Quinn Amper, Fred Strittmatter, Dean Elliot
- The Bugs Bunny Show Opening and Closing Theme: "This Is It" by Mack David & Jerry Livingston
- Film Editors: Treg Brown, Hal Geer, Fred Farrell, Chuck McCann, Jim Champin, Lee Gunther
- Producers: Chuck Jones, Friz Freleng, David H. DePatie
- Executive Producers: Chuck Jones, Friz Freleng, David H. DePatie, William L. Hendricks
- Cast: Mel Blanc, Stan Freberg, June Foray, Hal Smith, and Arthur Q. Bryan

== See also ==
- Looney Tunes and Merrie Melodies filmography
- List of longest-running American television series
