= Kitty Kornered =

1946 film

- Title card
- Directed by: Robert Clampett
- Starring: Mel Blanc
- Music by: Carl W. Stalling
- Animation by: Manny Gould; Rod Scribner; C. Melendez
- Layouts by: Thomas McKimson
- Backgrounds by: Dorcy Howard
- Color process: Technicolor
- Production company: Warner Bros. Cartoons
- Distributed by: Warner Bros. Pictures
- Release date: June 8, 1946
- Running time: 7:06
- Language: English

Kitty Kornered is a 1946 Warner Bros. Looney Tunes cartoon, directed by Robert Clampett. The short was released on June 8, 1946, and stars Porky Pig and Sylvester.

Porky and Sylvester would later be paired in a trio of shorts directed by Chuck Jones, Scaredy Cat, Claws for Alarm, and Jumpin' Jupiter where they explored spooky settings. Sylvester also appeared with Daffy Duck (who has a lisp like Sylvester) in The Scarlet Pumpernickel.

== Plot ==
The scene where the cats smoke, lounge and drink wine was cut from the cartoon when broadcast on the WB and the BBC.

Porky Pig kicks Sylvester and his other three cats out of the house on a cold, snowy night; but the cats aren't having it, so they turn the tables on Porky and throw him out, instead. Fuming, Porky returns to the house and finds the four cats smoking, drinking, eating chocolates and reading comic books. He frightens them away by making a shadow puppet of his dog "Lassie" with his fingers. When Sylvester discovers they've been duped, he and the other cats plot revenge by dressing up as Martians and faking a War of the Worlds type radio news bulletin, which Porky initially dismisses as silly; but after cuddling up and being kissed goodnight by three "Martians", Porky is frightened out of his wits and flees the bed in terror ("MEN FROM MARS!"). Porky breaks a glass case on the wall containing a blunderbuss ("USE ONLY IN CASE OF INVASION FROM MARS") and aims it at the "Martians", who are now advancing up the stairs with swords drawn, all dressed as Teddy Roosevelt ("Charge!!"). Porky retreats, jumps through a window, and the cats laugh at him. Shivering in the snow in his nightshirt, Porky asks the audience if they know of anyone with a house for rent.

== Reception ==
Comics historian Craig Yoe writes, "In this uproariously funny film written by director Robert Clampett himself, everything and everyone is made of rubber. The last half has some of the most exhilirating action ever put on film."

== See also ==
- Porky Pig filmography
- Sylvester the Cat filmography
- Looney Tunes and Merrie Melodies filmography (1940–1949)
