= Looney Tunes Golden Collection: Volume 3 =

2005 American DVD box set

- DVD cover
- Directed by: Chuck Jones; Friz Freleng; Robert McKimson; Bob Clampett; Frank Tashlin; Tex Avery; Arthur Davis; Cal Dalton; Ben Hardaway; Jack King; Maurice Noble; Hawley Pratt
- Produced by: Leon Schlesinger; Eddie Selzer; John W. Burton; David H. DePatie
- Starring: voice of Mel Blanc
- Distributed by: Warner Home Video
- Release date: October 25, 2005
- Running time: 442 minutes
- Country: United States
- Language: English

Looney Tunes Golden Collection: Volume 3 is a DVD box set that was released by Warner Home Video on October 25, 2005. The third release of the Looney Tunes Golden Collection DVD series, it contains 60 Looney Tunes and Merrie Melodies theatrical short subject cartoons, nine documentaries, 32 commentary tracks from animators and historians, 11 "vintage treasures from the vault", and 11 music-only or music-and-sound-effects audio tracks.

Volume 3 is the first in the series to have a disclaimer on the box art stating that the set "is intended for the adult collector" and may not be suitable for younger audiences. It is also the first to feature a warning, given by Whoopi Goldberg, a fan of the Warner Bros. cartoon characters, who tells the viewers that some of the cartoons on the set contain content that is politically incorrect by today's standards, but will be shown uncut for historical reasons, because "removing these inexcusable images and jokes from this collection would be the same as saying [these prejudices] never existed". Future volumes also contain this warning, which is presented instead as a title card before the main menu.

== Related releases ==
As with Volumes 1 and 2, the individual discs were released separately in Regions 2 & 4:

- Disc 1: Best of Bugs Bunny - Volume 3
- Disc 2: not released
- Disc 3: Best of Porky - Volume 2
- Disc 4: All-Stars - Volume 4

These single-disc versions have changed package of contents, as well as excluding all bonus features.

- Disc 1: Best of Bugs Bunny - Volume 3 includes the short Super-Rabbit from Disc 4: All-Stars - Volume 4 replacing shorts Rebel Rabbit and Duck! Rabbit! Duck!
- Disc 3: Best of Porky - Volume 2 includes the shorts Hollywood Capers and The Film Fan from Disc 2 replacing shorts Porky's Romance, Porky's Party and Porky in Egypt
- Disc 4: All-Stars - Volume 4 includes the shorts The CooCoo Nut Grove, She Was an Acrobat's Daughter, The Honey-Mousers and The Last Hungry Cat from Disc 2 replacing shorts Super-Rabbit, Daffy Duck and Egghead, A Gruesome Twosome, An Itch in Time and Gonzales' Tamales

In the UK (Region 2), the set was released unchanged in 2006.

== Disc 1 - Bugs Bunny Classics ==
All cartoons on this disc star Bugs Bunny.

#	Title	Co-stars	Year	Director	Series
1	Hare Force		1944	Friz Freleng	MM
2	Hare Remover	Elmer	1946	Frank Tashlin	MM
3	Hare Tonic	Elmer	1945	Chuck Jones	LT
4	A Hare Grows in Manhattan	Hector	1947	Friz Freleng	MM
5	Easter Yeggs	Elmer	1947	Robert McKimson	LT
6	The Wabbit Who Came to Supper	Elmer	1942	Friz Freleng	MM
7	Bowery Bugs	N/A	1949	Arthur Davis	MM
8	Homeless Hare	N/A	1950	Chuck Jones	MM
9	Case of the Missing Hare	N/A	1942	Chuck Jones	MM
10	Acrobatty Bunny	N/A	1946	Robert McKimson	LT
11	Wackiki Wabbit	N/A	1943	Chuck Jones	MM
12	Hare Do	Elmer	1949	Friz Freleng	MM
13	Rebel Rabbit	N/A	1949	Robert McKimson	MM
14	Hillbilly Hare	N/A	1950	Robert McKimson	MM
15	Duck! Rabbit, Duck!	Daffy, Elmer	1953	Chuck Jones	MM

=== Special features ===
==== Audio bonuses ====
- Music-and-effects-only audio tracks on Duck! Rabbit, Duck! and Hillbilly Hare
- Audio commentary
  - Jerry Beck and Martha Sigall on The Wabbit Who Came to Supper
  - Michael Barrier on Bowery Bugs and Hillbilly Hare
  - Greg Ford on Case of the Missing Hare
  - Eddie Fitzgerald and John Kricfalusi on Wackiki Wabbit
  - Eric Goldberg on Duck! Rabbit, Duck!

==== From the Vaults ====
- Chuck Amuck: 1991 Documentary
- The Bugs Bunny Show: The Honey-Mousers bridging sequences; Ball Point Puns audio recording sessions with Mel Blanc

==== Behind-the-Tunes ====
- A-Hunting We Will Go: Chuck Jones' Wabbit Season Twilogy: A look at the creation, comedy, and cultural influence of "The Hunter's Trilogy", three cartoons ("Rabbit Fire", "Rabbit Seasoning", and "Duck! Rabbit! Duck!") in which Daffy sets up Bugs to be shot by Elmer and the two argue over what hunting season it is (only for Daffy to get shot every time).

== Disc 2 - Hollywood Caricatures and Parodies ==
#	Title	Characters	Year	Director	Series
1	Daffy Duck in Hollywood	Daffy	1938	Tex Avery	MM
2	Hollywood Capers	Beans	1935	Jack King	LT
3	The CooCoo Nut Grove	Ben Birdie	1936	Friz Freleng	MM
4	Porky's Road Race	Porky	1937	Frank Tashlin	LT
5	The Woods Are Full of Cuckoos	Ben Birdie	1937	Frank Tashlin	MM
6	She Was an Acrobat's Daughter	N/A	1937	Friz Freleng	MM
7	The Film Fan	Porky	1939	Bob Clampett	LT
8	Speaking of the Weather	N/A	1937	Frank Tashlin	MM
9	Thugs with Dirty Mugs	N/A	1939	Tex Avery	MM
10	Goofy Groceries	N/A	1941	Bob Clampett	MM
11	Swooner Crooner	Porky	1944	Frank Tashlin	LT
12	Wideo Wabbit	Bugs, Elmer	1956	Robert McKimson	MM
13	The Honey-Mousers	The Honey-Mousers	1956	Robert McKimson	LT
14	The Last Hungry Cat	Tweety, Sylvester	1961	Friz Freleng, Hawley Pratt	MM
15	The Mouse That Jack Built	N/A	1959	Robert McKimson	MM

=== Special features ===
==== Audio bonuses ====
- Music-only audio track on Wideo Wabbit and The Honey-Mousers
- Music-and-effects-only audio track on The Last Hungry Cat
- Audio commentaries
  - Jerry Beck and Martha Sigall on Hollywood Capers
  - Michael Barrier on The Coo-Coo Nut Grove
  - Greg Ford on She Was an Acrobat's Daughter, Thugs with Dirty Mugs, and The Mouse That Jack Built with pre-score music
  - Daniel Goldmark on Swooner Crooner
  - June Foray and Jerry Beck on The Honey-Mousers

==== From the Vaults ====
- What's Up, Doc? A Salute to Bugs Bunny: Part 1 (Turner Pictures, 1990), which contains the following shorts:
  - A Wild Hare (1940) (unrestored, but with recreated titles)
  - The Heckling Hare (1941)
  - The Big Snooze (1946)
- Sinkin' in the Bathtub (1930)
- It's Got Me Again! (1932)

==== Behind-the-Tunes ====
- Fine Tooning: Restoring the Warner Bros. Cartoons: A look at how the Warner Bros. cartoons are digitally restored for the Golden Collection DVD sets.
- Bosko, Buddy and the Best of Black and White: A look at the very early Warner Bros. shorts, which either starred Bosko, Buddy, or were thinly-plotted animated music videos based on music from Warner Bros. music library at the time.

== Disc 3 - Porky and the Pigs ==
#	Title	Characters	Year	Director	Series
1	I Haven't Got a Hat	Beans, Porky	1935	Friz Freleng	MM
2	Porky's Romance	Petunia, Porky	1937	Frank Tashlin	LT
3	Porky's Party	Porky	1938	Bob Clampett	LT
4	Porky in Egypt	Porky	1938	Bob Clampett	LT
5	Porky and Teabiscuit	Porky	1939	Ben Hardaway and Cal Dalton	LT
6	Pigs Is Pigs	Piggy Hamhock	1937	Friz Freleng	MM
7	Pigs in a Polka	N/A	1943	Friz Freleng	MM
8	Porky Pig's Feat	Daffy, Porky	1943	Frank Tashlin	LT
9	Daffy Duck Slept Here	Daffy, Porky	1948	Robert McKimson	MM
10	Bye, Bye Bluebeard	Porky	1949	Arthur Davis	MM
11	An Egg Scramble	Porky, Prissy	1950	Robert McKimson	MM
12	Robin Hood Daffy	Daffy, Porky	1958	Chuck Jones	MM
13	The Windblown Hare	Bugs	1949	Robert McKimson	LT
14	Claws for Alarm	Porky, Sylvester	1954	Chuck Jones	MM
15	Rocket Squad	Daffy, Porky	1956	Chuck Jones	MM

=== Special features ===
==== Audio bonuses ====
- Music-only audio tracks on Robin Hood Daffy, Rocket Squad
- Music-and-effects-only audio track on The Windblown Hare, Claws for Alarm
- Audio commentaries
  - Jerry Beck on I Haven't Got a Hat
  - Mark Kausler on Porky's Romance
  - Eddie Fitzgerald and John Kricfalusi on Porky's Party, Claws for Alarm
  - Daniel Goldmark on Pigs in a Polka
  - Joe Dante on Porky Pig's Feat
  - Eric Goldberg on Robin Hood Daffy
  - Paul Dini on Rocket Squad

==== From the Vaults ====
- What's Up, Doc? A Salute to Bugs Bunny: Part 2 (Turner Pictures, 1990), which contains the following shorts:
  - Hair-Raising Hare (1946)
  - Hare Trigger (1945) (unrestored)
- The Bear That Wasn't (1967; MGM cartoon directed by Chuck Jones),
- Point Rationing of Foods (1943)
- Porky's Party Storyboard Reel

==== Behind-the-Tunes ====
- Tish Tash: The Animated World of Frank Tashlin: A look at the life and animated work of director Frank Tashlin.

== Disc 4 - All-Stars Cartoon Party ==
#	Title	Characters	Year	Director	Series
1	Daffy Duck and the Dinosaur	Daffy	1939	Chuck Jones	MM
2	Super-Rabbit	Bugs	1943	Chuck Jones	MM
3	Daffy Duck & Egghead	Daffy, Egghead	1938	Tex Avery	MM
4	A Gruesome Twosome	Tweety	1945	Bob Clampett	MM
5	Draftee Daffy	Daffy	1945	Bob Clampett	LT
6	Falling Hare	Bugs	1943	Bob Clampett	MM
7	Steal Wool	Ralph and Sam	1957	Chuck Jones	LT
8	Birds Anonymous	Tweety, Sylvester, Clarence Cat	1957	Friz Freleng	MM
9	No Barking	Claude, Frisky	1954	Chuck Jones	MM
10	Rabbit Punch	Bugs, The Crusher	1948	Chuck Jones	MM
11	An Itch in Time	A. Flea, Elmer, Willoughby	1943	Bob Clampett	MM
12	Odor-able Kitty	Pepé, Claude	1945	Chuck Jones	LT
13	Walky Talky Hawky	Foghorn, Henery, Barnyard Dawg	1946	Robert McKimson	MM
14	Gonzales' Tamales	Speedy, Sylvester	1957	Friz Freleng	LT
15	To Beep or Not to Beep	Wile E. Coyote and the Road Runner	1963	Chuck Jones, Maurice Noble	MM

=== Special features ===
==== Audio bonuses ====
- Music-only audio tracks on Gonzales' Tamales and Birds Anonymous
- Audio commentaries
  - Paul Dini on Super-Rabbit
  - John Kricfalusi on A Gruesome Twosome
  - Milton Gray on A Gruesome Twosome
  - Eddie Fitzgerald and John Kricfalusi on Draftee Daffy
  - John Kricfalusi and Bill Melendez on Falling Hare and An Itch in Time
  - Jerry Beck and Art Leonardi on Birds Anonymous and Gonzales' Tamales
  - Greg Ford on No Barking and To Beep or Not to Beep
  - Michael Barrier on Odor-able Kitty and Walky Talky Hawky

==== From the Vaults ====
- Private Snafu cartoons: Spies (1943), Rumors (1943), Snafuperman (1944)
- Falling Hare Storyboard Reel
- TV pilot: Philbert (Three's a Crowd) (1963) - with optional commentary by Jerry Beck and Art Leonardi

==== Behind-the-Tunes ====
- The Charm of Stink: On the Scent of Pepé Le Pew: A look at Chuck Jones' amorous skunk character, Pepe Le Pew
- Looney Tunes Go to War!: A look at the outrageous (and often offensive) cartoons released by Warner Bros. studios during World War II.
- Strictly for the Birds: Tweety and Sylvester's Award-Winning Teamup: A look at how Sylvester and Tweety's pairing led to Friz Freleng winning the Oscar for the 1957 short Birds Anonymous.

== Reception ==
In The New York Sun, author and critic Gary Giddins had complained that Looney Tunes Golden Collection: Volume 1 and Looney Tunes Golden Collection: Volume 2 were lacking in black-and-white shorts and seemed to avoid the more politically incorrect cartoons in the series. When his review was reprinted in the book, Natural Selection: Gary Giddins on Comedy, Film, Music, and Books, Giddins noted that Volume 3 made up for its forerunners' shortcomings by including some of the racial caricatures of the series, preceded by an explanatory introduction by Whoopi Goldberg.

== See also ==
- Looney Tunes and Merrie Melodies filmography
  - Looney Tunes and Merrie Melodies filmography (1929–1939)
  - Looney Tunes and Merrie Melodies filmography (1940–1949)
  - Looney Tunes and Merrie Melodies filmography (1950–1959)
  - Looney Tunes and Merrie Melodies filmography (1960–1969)
  - Looney Tunes and Merrie Melodies filmography (1970–present)
