= A Bear for Punishment =

1951 film by Chuck Jones

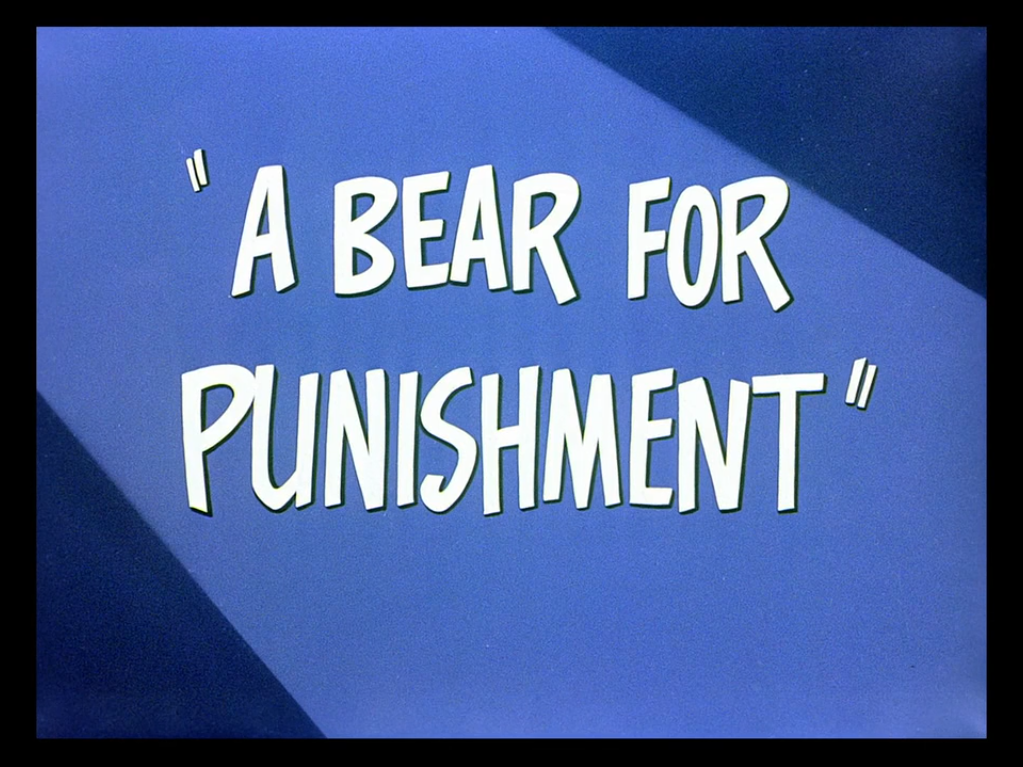
- Title card
- Directed by: Charles M. Jones
- Story by: Michael Maltese
- Starring: Bea Benaderet; Billy Bletcher; Stan Freberg (all uncredited)
- Music by: Carl Stalling
- Animation by: Ken Harris; Phil Monroe; Lloyd Vaughan; Ben Washam
- Layouts by: Robert Gribbroek
- Backgrounds by: Philip DeGuard
- Color process: Technicolor
- Production company: Warner Bros. Cartoons
- Distributed by: Warner Bros. Pictures; The Vitaphone Corporation
- Release date: October 20, 1951 (USA)
- Running time: 7:10
- Language: English

A Bear for Punishment is a 1951 animated Warner Bros. Looney Tunes cartoon directed by Chuck Jones. The short was released on October 20, 1951, and stars the Three Bears, in their last appearance in the golden age of American animation. This is also one of few shorts where Mel Blanc does not provide a voice for any character.

== Plot ==
In the Three Bears' cave, Henry Bear is woken up from slumber by a ridiculous number of alarm clocks. Junior Bear claps and happily exclaims: "Oh boy! At last, the great day has come at last! Oh boy, oh boy!" When he can't shut them up, Junior silences them all by whispering "Shhhhh!" Henry loses his temper, as he often does, shoving a clock in Junior's face. He is about to lose his temper with Mama Bear when she reminds him today is Father's Day. Henry feels embarrassed and (reluctantly) allows his family to treat him for Father's Day.

Unfortunately, the family's celebration of Father's Day repeatedly backfires on Henry: Junior trips on a roller skate as he is presenting Henry with breakfast in bed, covering him in food; he accidentally fills Henry's tobacco pipe with gunpowder and causes it to explode when he lights it; and he attempts to shave his "Paw" using a broken, shattered straight razor blade, leaving Henry injured to the point where Ma and Junior briefly thinks he's dead. However, Henry rises up and beats Junior again, causing him to exclaim: "Paw is all right now, Maw!"

Ma and Junior then put on an elaborate musical presentation for Father's Day, which embarrasses Henry to the extreme. This includes Junior reciting a cheesy poem for "My Paw," Ma giving an exaggerated song-and-dance act (while keeping a dead-serious and straight face for the entire time), and Henry being grabbed and dressed up as the Statue of Liberty, while Ma and Junior (dressed as George Washington and Abraham Lincoln respectively) present him as a tribute to Father's Day.

The march, "Father", performed by Junior and Mama, is a special vocal written to the tune of "Frat" by John F. Barth, a long-standing Warner cartoon staple.

== Voice cast ==
- Billy Bletcher as Papa Bear
- Bea Benaderet as Mama Bear
- Stan Freberg as Junior Bear

== Reception ==
Animation historian Greg Ford writes that A Bear for Punishment is "a tour de force depicting Maw and Junyer's overzealous salute to Father's Day... As outrageous as Ken Harris' animation of this pageant is, Jones' drawings of Paw, in intercut reaction shots, are even funnier... It is typical of Jones' direction that, even in the midst of one of the most energetic, floridly animated scenes in cartoon history, the primacy of the single drawing should reassert itself."

== Home media ==
- DVD - Looney Tunes Golden Collection: Volume 2, Disc 2
- Blu-ray - Looney Tunes Platinum Collection: Volume 3, Disc 1
