= 8 Ball Bunny =

1950 film by Chuck Jones

- Title card
- Directed by: Charles M. Jones
- Story by: Michael Maltese
- Starring: Mel Blanc
- Music by: Carl Stalling
- Animation by: Phil Monroe; Ben Washam; Lloyd Vaughan; Ken Harris; Emery Hawkins; Richard Thompson
- Layouts by: Peter Alvarado
- Backgrounds by: Peter Alvarado
- Color process: Technicolor
- Production company: Warner Bros. Cartoons
- Distributed by: Warner Bros. Pictures
- Release date: July 8, 1950
- Running time: 7:08
- Language: English

8 Ball Bunny is a Warner Bros. Looney Tunes cartoon directed by Chuck Jones. The short was released on July 8, 1950, and stars Bugs Bunny and Playboy Penguin.

In this film, Playboy is lost and Bugs vows to take him home. Bugs organizes a journey to the South Pole, failing to realize that Playboy is a captive penguin based in Hoboken.

== Plot ==
The Brooklyn Ice Palace closes, and the Ice Frolics crew accidentally leaves behind Playboy Penguin, one of their star performers. A chance encounter between Playboy and Bugs Bunny results in the latter undertaking the responsibility of returning Playboy to his home at the South Pole. However, Bugs' initial enthusiasm wanes upon realizing the considerable distance involved in reaching the South Pole.

Embarking on a journey southward, Bugs and Playboy encounter various challenges, including hitching a ride on a freight train to New Orleans, where they navigate encounters with a hobo and the deceptive allure of a ship bound for Brooklyn.

Despite Bugs' valiant attempts to steer the voyage toward the South Pole, unforeseen circumstances lead them astray to the tropical island of Martinique. Amidst their odyssey, Bugs' resourcefulness and ingenuity are juxtaposed with Playboy's plight, as the latter is tasked with constructing a dugout boat while Bugs entertains himself with musical pursuits. The appearance of Humphrey Bogart as a panhandler (in a whimsical nod to The Treasure of the Sierra Madre) injects a surreal element into their journey.

As Bugs and Playboy navigate through perilous terrains and near the South Pole, their journey culminates in a bittersweet revelation. Despite Bugs' efforts to fulfill his promise, the realization that Playboy's true destination actually lies in Hoboken, New Jersey, elicits sheer despair.

== Production notes ==
8 Ball Bunny is the second appearance of Playboy Penguin; his first appearance was in 1949's Frigid Hare.

== Reception ==
Cartoonist Jeff Smith writes, "8 Ball Bunny feels more like one of Chuck Jones' one-shot cartoons, such as Feed the Kitty (1952) or One Froggy Evening (1955) than the standard Bugs vs. Elmer outing. 8 Ball Bunny involves long time spans, days of travel, very few blackout gags, and a story with an actual beginning, middle, and end. Also, the little performing penguin is a bit of a cross between Michigan J. Frog and Marc Antony's adorable kitten: He's a performer with a top hat, and he's so cute, he's unbearable. In a perfect Chuck Jones kind of way, of course."

== Home media ==
The short is included in the VHS release Looney Tunes Video Show Volume 3, can be seen as a bonus feature on the DVD releases of the movie The Treasure of the Sierra Madre (the Humphrey Bogart caricature in this cartoon short is based on Bogart's character in the film) and the documentary film March of the Penguins. It is also featured uncensored and uncut and digitally remastered on disc one of the fourth volume of the Looney Tunes Golden Collection DVD set, as well as disc one of The Essential Bugs Bunny, disc one of Looney Tunes Platinum Collection: Volume 1, and disc one of Bugs Bunny 80th Anniversary Collection.

Preceded by What's Up Doc?	Bugs Bunny Cartoons; 1950	Succeeded by Hillbilly Hare
