= Pigs in a Polka =

1943 film by Isadore Freleng

- Original title card
- Directed by: Isadore Freleng
- Story by: Michael Maltese
- Produced by: Leon Schlesinger
- Starring: Mel Blanc; Sara Berner
- Music by: Carl W. Stalling
- Animation by: Richard Bickenbach
- Color process: Technicolor
- Production company: Leon Schlesinger Productions
- Distributed by: Warner Bros. Pictures
- Release date: February 6, 1943
- Running time: 7 min
- Country: United States
- Language: English

Pigs in a Polka is a 1943 American animated comedy short film directed by Isadore Freleng. The short was released on February 6, 1943. It is part of the Merrie Melodies series. It was re-released as a "Blue Ribbon" reissue in 1948, rendering the original film lost, though Michael Maltese kept the title and credits cels.

The film is a parody of two Walt Disney Productions films: 1933's Three Little Pigs and 1940's Fantasia. The familiar story of The Three Little Pigs is set in this film to several of Brahms' "Hungarian Dances", specifically No. 5, No. 7, No. 6 and No. 17 which appear in that order.

It was nominated for the 1942 Academy Award for Best Short Subject: Cartoons.

== Plot ==
Video for the Blue Ribbon edition of the short

After an introduction by the wolf, the plot loosely follows the traditional story of the three little pigs. The first pig, using a prefabricated home kit, erects a wire structure, then quickly covers it with straw. The second pig uses hundreds of matches to make up his house, though when he puts the last match in place on the roof, the entire building collapses. The third pig goes through the tedious task of laying bricks for his house.

Satisfied with their homes, the first two pigs dance around, act silly, and laugh with each other; the first pig plays a violin, and the second pig a flute. The wolf arrives dressed as a gypsy, and sets about, through dance, trying to lure the first two pigs into a position to be captured. The pigs are suspicious and, when the wolf thinks he has them, the pigs instead rough him up and emerge each wearing parts of his costume; they briefly dance until the wolf approaches threateningly. He chases them to the straw house, which he incinerates in seconds with a lit match. The pigs flee to the match house. Though it has a front door, it is still in a state of collapse; the pigs speedily pile the matches up to form a house, then the wolf drops one last match onto the roof and it all falls apart. The pigs race to the brick house. The wolf attempts to bash in the front door, then resorts to huffing and puffing to blow the house down (to which the pigs respond by offering Lusterine mouthwash), but he fails. The wolf sets up to run at the front door; the three pigs work together to squelch this effort.

The third pig is not thrilled to have the other two in his house, especially when they again begin dancing around with their instruments, acting silly and laughing. Then, they notice an apparently homeless woman (the wolf) outside the window, playing a violin in the snow. The 'snow' is actually talcum powder held on a stick above the wolf's head. The first two pigs take pity and push the third pig (who realizes it is the wolf) away from the door to let the despondent person in. The wolf continues the deception and continues playing the violin. The third pig, upon peeking under the clothing and seeing that the wolf has a record player on his back, flips the record over. Fast-paced music begins and the wolf dances to it, resulting in him being exposed when his costume falls off piece-by-piece. The wolf then chases the pigs up to the second floor of the house. The pigs make their escape in an elevator, but when the wolf tries to use it he drops into an empty shaft. The wolf is unaware that he is falling, but rather thinks he is riding the elevator down. He politely doffs his hat as gentlemen in an elevator did back in the 1940s and just stands there politely looking up. After a long fall, the doors open and he falls at the feet of the pigs as the cartoon irises out.

== Reception ==
Animation historian Greg Ford writes, "Friz Freleng invaded Disney territory with Pigs in a Polka, an irreverent reworking of Disney's breakthrough The Three Little Pigs (1933), here reimagined and propelled in its entirety by Brahms' Hungarian Dances. From the obligatory scene-setting rigamarole of the three pigs slapping together their three separate houses of straw, matchsticks and bricks, it's abundantly clear that Friz means to reapply the same tweaked synchronization of classical music to animated action that he achieved in the Franz Liszt-driven Rhapsody in Rivets (1941). The music-action symbiosis is, if anything, more accentuated than before."

== Home media ==
This film can be found in the Looney Tunes Golden Collection: Volume 3 disc 3, Warner Bros. Home Entertainment Academy Awards Animation Collection disc 2, Looney Tunes Platinum Collection: Volume 3 disc 1, and several low-budget home video and DVD releases.

This is one of the 61 pre-1948 WB cartoons to fall into the public domain as United Artists did not renew the copyright in time.
