= Wholly Smoke =

1938 film by Frank Tashlin

- Title card
- Directed by: Frank Tashlin
- Story by: Geo. Manuell
- Produced by: Leon Schlesinger
- Starring: Mel Blanc; Tedd Pierce; Cliff Nazarro
- Music by: Carl W. Stalling
- Animation by: Robt Bentley
- Color process: Black-and-white
- Production company: Leon Schlesinger Productions
- Distributed by: Warner Bros. Pictures; The Vitaphone Corporation
- Release date: August 27, 1938
- Running time: 7 min
- Country: United States
- Language: English

Wholly Smoke is a 1938 American animated comedy short film directed by Frank Tashlin. The short was released on August 27, 1938. It is part of the Looney Tunes series, the 45th cartoon to feature Porky Pig and the last to be directed by Tashlin until 1943.

== Plot ==
Porky Pig is preparing for church after his mother gives him money for the collection plate. On his way, he encounters a dog practicing smoking tricks. Porky bets his nickel for the dog's cigar to prove he is not a wimp, but fails miserably when he tries the tricks. He accidentally sucks in too much smoke and stumbles his way to a smoke shop.

Porky hallucinates and encounters Nick O'Teen, who shrinks him and tempts him with smoking. In a nightmare sequence, tobacco products resembling the Three Stooges and other celebrities mock and force-feed Porky. He quickly wakes up, rushes to church, but returns once again to retrieve his nickel and return the cigar. He gives his offering and swears not to smoke again.

== Reception ==
Animation historian David Gerstein writes that Wholly Smoke represents "Warner Bros.' most successful effort to capture what it's like to be a child. Wholly Smoke isn't just a morality tale or just another wacky Warner flight into dreamland. It's also the surprisingly real story of a little boy—our Porky—and his struggle with a larger world."

== Home media ==
DVD:

- Looney Tunes Golden Collection: Volume 5
- Porky Pig 101

DVD/Blu-ray:

- Looney Tunes Platinum Collection: Volume 3

== See also ==
- Porky Pig filmography
- Looney Tunes and Merrie Melodies filmography (1930–1939)
