= Life with Feathers =

1945 film

- Directed by: I. Freleng
- Story by: Tedd Pierce
- Starring: Mel Blanc; Sara Berner; Dave Barry
- Music by: Carl W. Stalling; Milt Franklyn
- Animation by: Virgil Ross; Ken Champin; Gerry Chiniquy; Manuel Perez; Jack Bradbury; A.C. Gamer
- Layouts by: Hawley Pratt; Owen Fitzgerald
- Production company: Warner Bros. Cartoons
- Distributed by: Warner Bros. Pictures; The Vitaphone Corporation
- Release date: March 24, 1945
- Running time: 7:41
- Country: United States
- Language: English

Life with Feathers is a 1945 Warner Bros. Merrie Melodies animated short film directed by Friz Freleng. The short was released on March 24, 1945, and is the first cartoon to feature Sylvester the Cat.

== Plot ==
A dour lovebird is experiencing marital difficulties and is thrown out of his cage by "Sweetiepuss", his wife. The depressed lovebird decides to end it all and considers various methods of suicide, finally deciding on death by cat. The lovebird encounters Sylvester the Cat, selecting choice morsels from garbage cans and whistles to get his attention. As Sylvester is about to pounce on the lovebird, he abruptly stops, puzzled why the blindfolded bird didn't try to escape. Sylvester concludes that the lovebird is poisonous and wants to be eaten so the cat will die. The bird begs Sylvester to eat him, but he refuses. Sylvester is then pursued relentlessly by the lovebird who employs various schemes, attempting to force or trick the cat into eating him. Finally, Sylvester is so hungry he gives in and just as he is about to eat the lovebird, a telegram arrives from Sweetiepuss: She is moving home to her mother. The happy lovebird has changed his mind about being eaten, but Sylvester hasn't. Sylvester gives chase to the lovebird, but ends up falling off a ledge. When the lovebird arrives safely back in his cage, he finds Sweetiepuss there; she has decided to stay. The lovebird then frantically searches for Sylvester, calling "Here kitty, kitty, here pussycat!"

== Cast ==
- Mel Blanc as Sylvester, Lovebird, Telegram Guy
- Sara Berner as Sweetiepuss, Housewife
- Dave Barry as Radio Announcer

== Home media ==
- VHS – Cartoon Moviestars: Tweety and Sylvester
- LaserDisc – The Golden Age of Looney Tunes, Volume 1, Side 2: Firsts.
- VHS – The Golden Age of Looney Tunes, Vol. 2: Firsts
- Blu-ray Disc, DVD – Looney Tunes Platinum Collection: Volume 3, Disc 2.

== See also ==
- Sylvester the Cat filmography
- Looney Tunes and Merrie Melodies filmography (1940–1949)
