= Lew Lehr =

American comedian (1895–1950)

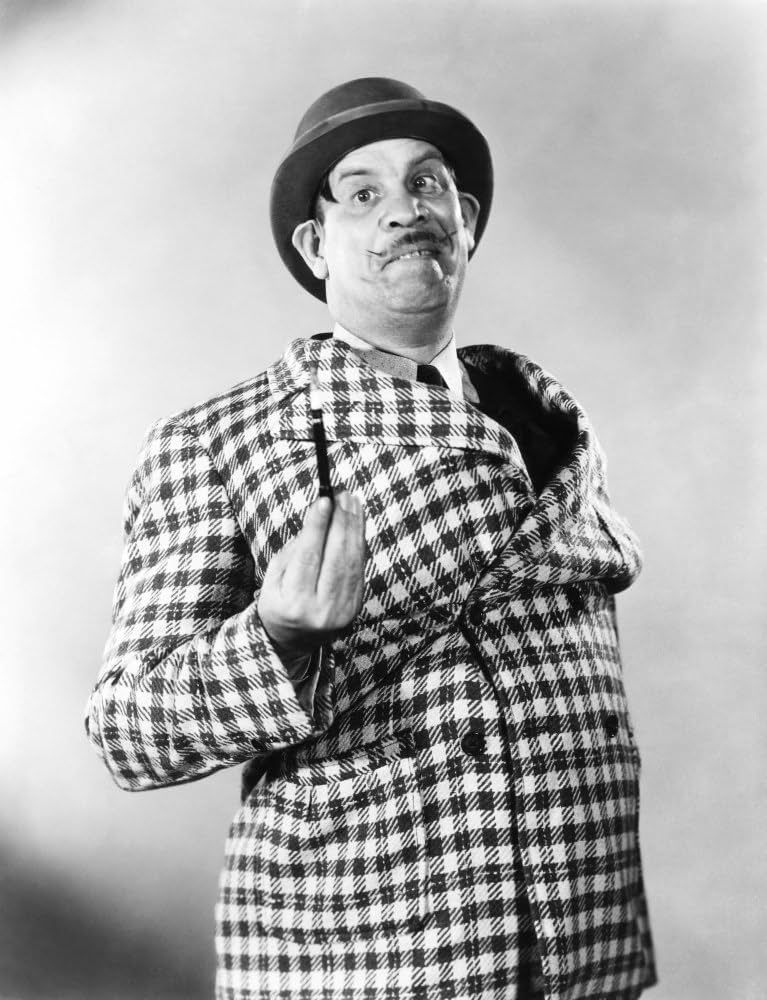
- Lehr in 1938
- Born: May 14, 1895; Philadelphia, Pennsylvania
- Died: March 6, 1950 (aged 54); Brookline, Massachusetts

Comedy career
- Years active: 1930s-1949

Lew Lehr (May 14, 1895 – March 6, 1950) was a comedian, writer and editor known for his humorous contributions to Fox Movietone News, his radio appearances and his popular catchphrase, "Monkeys is the cwaziest peoples."

Born in Philadelphia, Pennsylvania, Lehr appeared in vaudeville and musical theater. In the early 1930s, he entered the short film business, notable for creating his Dribble Puss Parade film shorts. He was credited with at least 300 humorous newsreel inserts and short films for over 25 years beginning in 1932 (some of these were posthumous, as Lehr died in 1950).

== Radio ==
Lehr began making radio guest appearances during the late 1930s. In addition to broadcasts with Ben Bernie, he was one of the quizmasters on Detect and Collect (1935–36), filled in for Will Rogers in 1935 on Gulf Oil Headliners and took part in An Irving Berlin Tribute (1938). He was heard on You Asked for It (June 9, 1944), was a regular on the Camel Comedy Caravan of the early 1940s and later was one of the panelists on the 1947 revival of Stop Me If You've Heard This One.

"Stop Me If You've Heard This One," 1949

== Books ==
His books included Lew Lehr's Cookbook for Men (1949) and Stop Me If You've Heard This One (Permabooks 1949).

== Death ==
Lehr died in Brookline, Massachusetts in 1950.

== In popular culture ==
Between 1937 and 1949, he was caricatured in eight Warner Bros. animated cartoons: She Was an Acrobat's Daughter (1937), Porky in Egypt (1938), The Sour Puss (1940), Porky's Snooze Reel (1941) Russian Rhapsody (1944), Herr Meets Hare (1945), Daffy Duck Hunt (1949) and Scaredy Cat (1948). This caricature later appeared in the fall 2001 South Park episode spoofing wartime Warner Bros. cartoons, "Osama bin Laden Has Farty Pants", which directly references the end of the Russian Rhapsody cartoon.

His "cwaziest peoples" catchphrase is used in the Monkees film Head (1968).
