= A Gruesome Twosome =

1945 film directed by Bob Clampett

- Title card
- Directed by: Robert Clampett
- Story by: Warren Foster
- Music by: Carl W. Stalling
- Animation by: Robert McKimson; Manny Gould; Rod Scribner; Basil Davidovich
- Layouts by: Thomas McKimson
- Backgrounds by: Michael Sasanoff
- Color process: Technicolor
- Production company: Warner Bros. Cartoons
- Distributed by: Warner Bros. Pictures
- Release date: June 9, 1945
- Running time: 7:26
- Language: English

A Gruesome Twosome is a 1945 Warner Bros. Merrie Melodies cartoon directed by Bob Clampett. The short was released on June 9, 1945, and stars Tweety.

This is the last Tweety film directed by Clampett, following 1942's A Tale of Two Kitties and 1944's Birdy and the Beast, and the last one before he is permanently paired with Sylvester. One of the cats in this cartoon is a caricature of the comedian Jimmy Durante.

In the film, a female cat attempts to end a love triangle involving her and her two suitors, by proclaiming that she will choose the male who can bring her a bird as an offering. The two rival males choose Tweety as their prey, who persistently outwits them.

== Plot ==
The cartoon opens up with two cats (a couple) talking/singing in meows (set to the tune of the 1909 pop tune Me-ow). Then we see a red cat (a caricature of Jimmy Durante) who hits a yellow cat with a frying pan while the yellow cat is talking to the female cat. Then the red cat tries to get the girl to kiss him. As he tries to kiss her, out of nowhere an insane dog (who admits that he "doesn't actually belong in this picture") pops up and kisses the female cat, prompting the Durante cat to exclaim that "Everybody wants to get into the act. Umbriago! IT'S DISGUSTING!" As the two cats fight, the female tells them whoever can bring her a bird can be her "fella".

Following this decision, the red cat uses numerous tricks to stop the yellow cat. Then we see both male cats climbing up the pole. Tweety states his usual catchphrase "I tawt I taw a putty tat," followed by "I tawt I taw ANOTHER putty tat." Then both cats realize that the other one is up with them. They fight and Tweety hits them with a mallet, causing them to fall off the pole; then Tweety states "Aw, the poor puddy tats! They fall down and go BOOM!" (on the word BOOM, Tweety yells at the top of his lungs) and smiles.

The red cat soon wakes up, and so does the yellow one. The yellow cat gets hit by a frying pan again. Then the cats fight again, before coming to an understanding. The red cat realizes that they must use strategy (which the Durante cat pronounces "stragedy"). Then the red cat comes up with a plan. We then see them in an unrealistic horse costume, and the red cat states that he is the head. Tweety pops out of the horse's tail and grabs a bee. He slaps the bee, and then puts it into the horse costume. The cats get stung and crash into a tree.

The red cat soon comes up with another plan. But then Tweety lures a dog to attack the cats, by grabbing the dog's bone and putting it into the cat's costume. Tweety says "You know I get wid of more putty tats that way!" then does the Durante "hot cha cha cha" as the film irises out.

== Cast ==
- Mel Blanc as Tweety, Durante Cat, Dumb Cat and Dog (uncredited)
- Sara Berner as Female Cat (uncredited)

== Reception ==
Animation scholar Michael Barrier writes, "Like the earlier cartoon A Tale of Two Kitties, A Gruesome Twosome pits Tweety against two cats, and Tweety is so overpowering that even two foes seem like far too few. There's scarcely a hint here of the cute yellow canary that Tweety would become when director Friz Freleng took the helm. Clampett's Tweety is not a baby bird anyone would want to encounter in a dark alley."

== Legacy ==
The cat duo in the short would later influence the design of Stimpy from the Ren & Stimpy franchise.

== Home media ==
A Gruesome Twosome is presented (uncut and restored) on the Looney Tunes Golden Collection: Volume 3 and the Looney Tunes Platinum Collection: Volume 3.
