= She Was an Acrobat's Daughter =

1937 film by Isadore Freleng

- Title card
- Directed by: Isadore Freleng
- Produced by: Leon Schlesinger
- Music by: Carl W. Stalling
- Animation by: Bob McKimson; A.C. Gamer
- Color process: Technicolor
- Production company: Leon Schlesinger Productions
- Distributed by: Warner Bros. Productions; The Vitaphone Corporation
- Release date: April 10, 1937
- Running time: 8 min
- Country: United States

She Was an Acrobat's Daughter is a 1937 American animated comedy short film directed by Isadore Freleng. It was released on April 10, 1937. It is the 72nd film in the Merrie Melodies series.

== Plot ==
A group of animals are in a movie theater, swapping seats for more comfortable positions until everyone joins in.

A newsreel titled "Goofy-Tone News", a parody of Movietone News. is played, hosted by Dole Promise, a caricature of Lowell Thomas who has trouble recalling his own name. The first news is that the United States are involved in a shipbuilding race and have just constructed the longest ocean liner, which covers part of the Atlantic Ocean and most of the distance between London and New York City. The next news features Heddie Camphor, a caricature of Eddie Cantor, interviewing Little Oscar, a long-lost insect who is annoyed by the media coverage he receives. The next news features a horse race in Louisiana, which has no gags of note, as it is displayed while a dog audience member attempts to switch seats for a better viewing perspective to no avail, while a hippo leaves his seat and becomes a source of inconvenience for the other moviegoers.

Another newsreel titled Nit-Wit News begins, featuring "Who Dehr" (a parody of Lew Lehr). The news featured is about a case of rabies at Boondoggle, Missouri, where all townsfolk comically act like dogs after being infected. As Dehr concludes his report, he is bitten by one of the affected townspeople. Back in the theater, the hippo returns to his seat to the chagrin of the moviegoers. A sing-along led by Maestro Stickoutski, a caricature of Leopold Stokowski, involves the titular song. The audience obliviously sing to the warning "please do not spit on the floor", which fits in with the music.

Afterwards, the main feature is presented, a parody of The Petrified Forest titled The Petrified Florist. The film opens with a character portrayed by Lester Coward, a caricature of Leslie Howard, attempting to secure transportation via hitchhiking while reading a book. The audience kicks out a donkey who attempts to sell snacks. He enters a desert inn, where he is met by the waiter, portrayed by Bette Davis, a caricature of Bette Davis, who is smitten with him. When she figures him to be a poet, he gives a mangled rendition of Mary Had a Little Lamb.

A child goose constantly annoys his father and the other moviegoers by asking a multitude of questions. He is thrown out and runs into the projection room, where he turns random knobs, speeds up the entire film, then accidentally enters the projector's gear system, destroying it as he is covered in film reels to his chagrin.

== Home media ==
- The Golden Age of Looney Tunes Volume 5, Side 3
- Looney Tunes Golden Collection: Volume 3, Disc 2
