= Porky's Party =

1938 film by Robert Clampett

- Title card
- Directed by: Robert Clampett
- Produced by: Leon Schlesinger
- Starring: Mel Blanc
- Music by: Carl W. Stalling
- Animation by: Charles Jones; Norman McCabe
- Color process: Black-and-white
- Production company: Leon Schlesinger Productions
- Distributed by: Warner Bros. Pictures; The Vitaphone Corporation
- Release date: June 25, 1938
- Running time: 7 min
- Country: United States
- Language: English

Porky's Party is a 1938 American animated comedy short film directed by Robert Clampett. The short was released on June 25, 1938. It is the 104th film in the Looney Tunes series, the 42nd cartoon to feature Porky Pig and the last to feature Chuck Jones as an animator, as he was assigned his own directorial unit after Frank Tashlin left for Walt Disney Productions. Gabby Goat and Petunia Pig were intended to appear in the film, but the studio's firing of Tashlin and cutting ties with Ub Iwerks led to their removal and replacement.

== Plot ==
Porky Pig prepares his birthday party while his dog Black Fury steals some of Porky's food. He receives a letter from his uncle Pincus, who is staying abroad in Hong Kong and mails him a live silkworm who obeys orders upon hearing the word "Sew". It sews lingerie much to Porky's embarrassment. Porky applies 99% alcohol hair-growth formula on his own head, not knowing that he is incapable of growing hair. Black Fury obliviously drinks the formula and enjoys it, becoming drunken after finishing the entire bottle.

Porky welcomes his friend Penguin, who eats all of the cake, but respectfully leaves a slice and greets Porky. Goosey also arrives to insult Porky with an sign reading "Happy Birthday, Fat Boy!". Porky repeatedly stutters the word so, causing the silkworm in Porky's pocket to mistake the word for "sew" and begins sewing lingerie. Porky attempts to get rid of the silkworm, but it lands in Penguin's food. Penguin is discomforted by the discovery of fabric in his food, but nevertheless continues to eat until a top hat is stuck in him. Goosey attempts to get it loose with a mallet until Penguin is slammed into the floor and forming a crater.

Black Fury drunkenly tries on shaving cream but is scared away by the electric razor. Porky confuses him with a rabid dog and runs away with Penguin and Goosey. A chase sequence occurs where the trio cause destruction while trying to evade Black Fury. Penguin is unable to keep up and is trapped on a bed with Black Fury, who shakes off the shaving cream and reassuring Porky. The silkworm makes Penguin vomit lingerie and spins a cocoon around Penguin, causing Goosey to knock him out with a mallet.

== Home media ==
The short was released on disc 3 of the Looney Tunes Golden Collection: Volume 3 DVD set, and on disc 1 of the Porky Pig 101 DVD set.

== See also ==
- Porky Pig filmography
- Looney Tunes and Merrie Melodies filmography (1930–1939)

Preceded by Porky the Fireman	Cartoons Featuring Porky Pig; 1938	Succeeded by Porky's Spring Planting
