= The Last Hungry Cat =

- Title card
- Directed by: Friz Freleng; Hawley Pratt
- Story by: Dave Detiege; John Dunn
- Produced by: David H. DePatie (uncredited)
- Starring: Mel Blanc (Sylvester, Tweety); June Foray (Granny)
- Narrated by: Ben Frommer
- Edited by: Treg Brown
- Music by: Milt Franklyn
- Animation by: Gerry Chiniquy; Virgil Ross; Bob Matz; Lee Halpern; Art Leonardi
- Layouts by: Hawley Pratt
- Backgrounds by: Tom O’Loughlin
- Color process: Technicolor
- Production company: Warner Bros. Cartoons
- Distributed by: Warner Bros. Pictures
- Release date: December 2, 1961
- Running time: 7:23
- Language: English

The Last Hungry Cat is a Warner Bros. Merrie Melodies cartoon animated short directed by Friz Freleng and Hawley Pratt. The short was released on December 2, 1961, and stars Tweety and Sylvester.

== Plot ==
The short opens with a shadow of a bear walking up to an outline silhouette of himself and, speaking in a quasi-Hitchcockian accent, announcing, "Tonight, ladies and gentlemen, we bring you a story about...murder."

The story opens with Sylvester waiting outside Granny's apartment as she puts Tweety to bed and goes to visit a neighbor. He then sneaks into the apartment and stacks a bunch of furniture to reach the bird cage, but the stack collapses and the fall knocks him out long enough for Tweety to escape. When he comes to, he finds one of Tweety's feathers in his mouth and mistakenly believes that he has eaten him. Hearing Granny returning, Sylvester runs out of the apartment and hides in a nearby alley.

The Hitchcock-bear (off-screen) taunts Sylvester's success in finally eating Tweety, stating that he had to commit murder to do it, but Sylvester, breaking the fourth wall, laughs off the Hitchcock-bear's suggestion. But the Hitchcock-bear begins to play on Sylvester's nerves, suggesting that there is a good chance that nobody will ever find out about it; then, when Sylvester sees a newspaper headline saying "Police Hunt 'The Cat' " (referring to a human criminal with that alias) and hears sirens of police cars, he hides in a nearby house and attempts to get what he did off his mind, but to no avail, especially after an embarrassed announcer on the radio flubs his announcement by saying, "Your local company will present gas chamber music ...I...I...I mean your local gas company will present chamber music." He tries to get some sleep but, after staying awake all night haunted by his guilt, jumps up screaming, runs into the bathroom and both swallows, and showers himself with, multiple sleeping pills, which also fail to help.

As Sylvester lies on the bathroom floor sobbing, the Hitchcock-bear suggests that he give himself up and accept the consequences; Sylvester agrees and runs through the alleys yelling "I did it! I'm guilty!" all the way back to Granny's apartment where he finds Tweety asleep in his cage, safe and sound. Overjoyed, Sylvester grabs the bird, kissing him over and over again, but when he is tempted and again tries to eat the bird, he is attacked by Granny, who caught him and chases him out of the apartment while hitting him with a broom. Tweety comments, "That puddy tat's gonna have an awful headache in da morning."

At the end, the Hitchcock-bear attempts to relate the moral of the story quoting Shakespeare, saying, "In the words of the Bard, 'conscience makes cowards of us all.'" Sylvester (off-screen) shouts "Ahhh, shaddup!" and hits him on the head with a brick. The Hitchcock-bear says "Good evening," then walks off with a lump on his head, the lump also having grown on his outline.

== Availability ==
The Last Hungry Cat can be found on the DVD sets Looney Tunes Golden Collection: Volume 3 and Looney Tunes Super Stars' Tweety & Sylvester: Feline Fwenzy. It is also available on the Blu-ray set Looney Tunes Collector's Vault Volume 2.

== See also ==
- List of American films of 1961
