= Looney Tunes Platinum Collection: Volume 3 =

2014 American cartoon anthology

- Blu-ray Disc cover
- Directed by: Friz Freleng; Chuck Jones; Frank Tashlin; Bob Clampett; Robert McKimson; Maurice Noble; Arthur Davis; Abe Levitow; Hawley Pratt
- Produced by: Leon Schlesinger; Eddie Selzer; John W. Burton; David H. DePatie
- Starring: Mel Blanc (voice)
- Music by: Carl Stalling; Milt Franklyn
- Distributed by: Warner Home Video
- Release date: August 12, 2014
- Country: United States
- Language: English

Looney Tunes Platinum Collection: Volume 3 is a Blu-ray and DVD release by Warner Home Video. It contains 50 Looney Tunes and Merrie Melodies cartoons and numerous supplements. It was released on Blu-ray on August 12, 2014, and was released on DVD on November 4, 2014.

As per Jerry Beck's remarks during an episode of Stu's Show, it was indicated that Volume 3 would likely serve as the final installment of the Platinum Collection series. This decision stemmed from the diminished sales figures of Volume 2 in 2012 and the absence of a budget allocated by Warner Bros. for remastering the four films that had not been previously released on DVD and Blu-ray. Notably, the Blu-ray edition of this volume comprises only two discs, a departure from prior releases. A 12-page booklet akin to the one accompanying Volume 2 is included.

All cartoons released in this set are either an Academy Award winner or nominee or were listed in Jerry Beck's 2010 book The 100 Greatest Looney Tunes Cartoons. All but four cartoons — Honey's Money, Life with Feathers, Tree for Two, and Beep Prepared — were previously restored as part of the Looney Tunes Golden Collection, the Warner Bros. Home Entertainment Academy Awards Animation Collection, or a Looney Tunes Super Stars DVD; of these four, three are new to Blu-ray and DVD, while one (Beep Prepared) had previously appeared unrestored as a bonus feature on the DVD release of Splendor in the Grass.

== Disc 1 ==
#	Title	Characters	Year	Director	Series
1	Hiawatha's Rabbit Hunt	Bugs	1941	Friz Freleng	MM
2	A Corny Concerto	Bugs, Daffy, Elmer, Porky	1943	Bob Clampett	MM
3	Falling Hare	Bugs	1943	Bob Clampett	MM
4	Little Red Riding Rabbit	Bugs	1944	Friz Freleng	MM
5	Hair-Raising Hare	Bugs, Gossamer	1946	Chuck Jones	MM
6	Acrobatty Bunny	Bugs	1946	Robert McKimson	LT
7	The Big Snooze	Bugs, Elmer	1946	Bob Clampett	LT
8	A Hare Grows in Manhattan	Bugs	1947	Friz Freleng	MM
9	Easter Yeggs	Bugs, Elmer	1947	Robert McKimson	LT
10	Slick Hare	Bugs, Elmer	1947	Friz Freleng	MM
11	Gorilla My Dreams	Bugs	1948	Robert McKimson	LT
12	High Diving Hare	Bugs, Sam	1949	Friz Freleng	LT
13	Hillbilly Hare	Bugs	1950	Robert McKimson	MM
14	Bunny Hugged	Bugs, The Crusher	1951	Chuck Jones	MM
15	Operation: Rabbit	Bugs, Wile E.	1952	Chuck Jones	LT
16	Bully for Bugs	Bugs	1953	Chuck Jones	LT
17	Bugs and Thugs	Bugs, Rocky and Mugsy	1954	Friz Freleng	LT
18	Knighty Knight Bugs	Bugs, Sam	1958	Friz Freleng	LT
19	Honey's Money (Note: New to Blu-ray and DVD.)	Sam	1962	Friz Freleng	MM
20	The Hep Cat	Willoughby	1942	Bob Clampett	LT
21	Pigs in a Polka		1943	Friz Freleng	MM
22	A Ham in a Role	Goofy Gophers	1949	Robert McKimson	LT
23	Dog Gone South	Charlie, Colonel Shuffle	1950	Chuck Jones	MM
24	A Bear for Punishment	The Three Bears	1951	Chuck Jones	LT
25	Steal Wool	Ralph and Sam	1957	Chuck Jones	LT

=== Special features ===
- Audio Commentaries
  - Michael Barrier on Bully for Bugs, Slick Hare, A Corny Concerto, A Bear for Punishment, Hillbilly Hare
  - Greg Ford on High Diving Hare
  - Michael Barrier and Greg Ford on Hair-Raising Hare
  - Bill Melendez on The Big Snooze
  - Jerry Beck on Gorilla My Dreams
  - Jerry Beck and June Foray on Honey's Money
  - John Kricfalusi and Bill Melendez on Falling Hare
  - Daniel Goldmark on Pigs in a Polka
  - Paul Dini on Operation: Rabbit
- Music and effects track on Operation: Rabbit, Bunny Hugged, Hillbilly Hare, A Bear for Punishment
- Behind the Tunes:
  - "Bugs Bunny: Ain't He a Stinker?" (The Essential Bugs Bunny)
  - "The Art of the Gag" (Golden Collection Volume 4)
  - "Drawn to Life: The Art of Robert McKimson" (Golden Collection Volume 5)
  - "Wild Lines: The Art of Voice Acting" (Golden Collection Volume 4)
- Documentaries:
  - "That's All Folks! Tales From Termite Terrace" (New)
  - "Irreverent Imagination: The Golden Age of Looney Tunes" (Golden Collection Volume 1)
  - "Drawn For Glory: Animation's Triumph at the Oscars" (Academy Award Collection)
- Storyboard reel for Hair-Raising Hare.

== Disc 2 ==
#	Title	Characters	Year	Director	Series
1	Porky Pig's Feat	Daffy, Porky, Bugs (cameo)	1943	Frank Tashlin	LT
2	Scrap Happy Daffy	Daffy	1943	Frank Tashlin	LT
3	Plane Daffy	Daffy	1944	Frank Tashlin	LT
4	The Stupid Cupid	Daffy, Elmer	1944	Frank Tashlin	LT
5	Draftee Daffy	Daffy	1945	Bob Clampett	LT
6	Nasty Quacks	Daffy	1945	Frank Tashlin	MM
7	The Stupor Salesman	Daffy	1948	Arthur Davis	LT
8	Wholly Smoke	Porky	1938	Frank Tashlin	LT
9	Swooner Crooner	Porky	1944	Frank Tashlin	LT
10	Life with Feathers	Sylvester	1945	Friz Freleng	MM
11	Canary Row	Sylvester, Tweety, Granny	1950	Friz Freleng	MM
12	Tree for Two	Sylvester, Spike and Chester	1952	Friz Freleng	MM
13	Sandy Claws	Sylvester, Tweety, Granny	1955	Friz Freleng	LT
14	Dog Pounded	Sylvester, Tweety, Pepé (cameo)	1954	Friz Freleng	LT
15	Satan's Waitin'	Sylvester, Tweety	1954	Friz Freleng	LT
16	Birds Anonymous	Sylvester, Tweety	1957	Friz Freleng	MM
17	Mouse and Garden	Sylvester	1960	Friz Freleng	LT
18	The Pied Piper of Guadalupe	Speedy, Sylvester	1961	Friz Freleng, Hawley Pratt	LT
19	A Gruesome Twosome	Tweety	1945	Bob Clampett	MM
20	Guided Muscle	Wile E. Coyote and the Road Runner	1955	Chuck Jones	LT
21	Beep Prepared (Note: Newly restored.)	Wile E. Coyote and the Road Runner	1961	Chuck Jones, Maurice Noble	MM
22	Walky Talky Hawky	Barnyard, Foghorn, Henery	1946	Robert McKimson	MM
23	Rhapsody in Rivets		1941	Friz Freleng	MM
24	High Note		1960	Chuck Jones	LT
25	Nelly's Folly		1961	Chuck Jones, Abe Levitow, Maurice Noble	MM

=== Special features ===
- Audio Commentaries
  - Jerry Beck on Canary Row and Walky Talky Hawky
  - Joe Dante on Porky Pig's Feat
  - Eddie Fitzgerald and John Kricfalusi on Draftee Daffy
  - Daniel Goldmark on Swooner Crooner and Wholly Smoke
  - Jerry Beck and Art Leonardi on Birds Anonymous
  - John Kricfalusi on A Gruesome Twosome
  - Milton Gray on A Gruesome Twosome
  - Greg Ford on Plane Daffy and Scrap Happy Daffy
  - Eddie Fitzgerald on The Stupid Cupid
  - Michael Barrier on Walky Talky Hawky
- Music-Only Tracks on Guided Muscle, Birds Anonymous, Satan's Waitin', and Nelly's Folly
- Behind the Tunes:
  - "Daffy Duck: Ridicule is the Burden of Genius" (The Essential Daffy Duck)
  - "Unsung Maestros: A Directors Tribute" (Golden Collection Volume 5)
  - "Tish Tash: The Animated World of Frank Tashlin" (Golden Collection Volume 3)
  - "Strictly For the Birds: Tweety & Sylvester's Award-Winning Team-up" (Golden Collection Volume 3)
- Documentaries:
  - "Mel Blanc: The Man of a Thousand Voices" (Golden Collection Volume 6)
  - "The Boys From Termite Terrace" (Golden Collection Volume 1)
- Frank Tashlin's Storybooks:
  - "Little Chic's Wonderful Mother" (Golden Collection Volume 4)
  - "Tony and Clarence" (Golden Collection Volume 4)

== Reception ==
A review at AnimeSuperhero found the collection offered "fifty classic, remastered cartoons and a lot of bonus features. However, it's disappointing that there is very little "new" here for those who have been collecting the Golden Collection DVDs from the beginning." Another review, at DVD Talk, praised and recommended the collection.

== See also ==
- Looney Tunes Golden Collection
- Looney Tunes and Merrie Melodies filmography
  - Looney Tunes and Merrie Melodies filmography (1930–1939)
  - Looney Tunes and Merrie Melodies filmography (1940–1949)
  - Looney Tunes and Merrie Melodies filmography (1950–1959)
  - Looney Tunes and Merrie Melodies filmography (1960–1969)
  - Looney Tunes and Merrie Melodies filmography (1970–present)
