= Duck! Rabbit, Duck! =

1953 film by Chuck Jones

- Title card
- Directed by: Charles M. Jones
- Story by: Michael Maltese
- Starring: Mel Blanc; Arthur Q. Bryan
- Music by: Carl Stalling; Milt Franklyn
- Animation by: Ken Harris; Abe Levitow; Richard Thompson; Lloyd Vaughan; Ben Washam
- Layouts by: Maurice Noble
- Backgrounds by: Philip de Guard
- Color process: Technicolor
- Production company: Warner Bros. Cartoons
- Distributed by: Warner Bros. Pictures; The Vitaphone Corporation
- Release date: October 3, 1953
- Running time: 6:49
- Language: English

Duck! Rabbit, Duck! is a 1953 Warner Bros. Merrie Melodies cartoon directed by Charles M. Jones. The cartoon was released on October 3, 1953 and stars Bugs Bunny, Daffy Duck and Elmer Fudd.

The cartoon is the third of Jones' "hunting trilogy", which began with 1951's Rabbit Fire and 1952's Rabbit Seasoning.

== Plot ==
In the winter landscape, Daffy Duck embarks on a campaign to remove and incinerate "Duck Season Open" signs to stave off the threat of being hunted. Daffy then manipulates Elmer into believing it is rabbit season. In the ensuing confrontation, Daffy lures Bugs out under false pretenses, but Bugs defends himself by purporting to be an endangered "fricasseeing rabbit". Daffy tries to convince Elmer to shoot Bugs by writing him up a hunting license, but Bugs tricks him into writing "duck" in place of "rabbit", leading Elmer to shoot Daffy again.

Bugs continues to outwit Daffy in a series of encounters, characterized by misidentifications and reactions. Notably, Bugs constructs a snow rabbit effigy, changes into an angelic guise post-explosion, and later disguises himself as a duck. Daffy's sanity eventually unravels, culminating in a frenetic insistence on being shot, while Elmer spirals into confusion. At this point Bugs appears in a game warden disguise, declaring to Elmer that it's actually "baseball season".

As Elmer departs in a frenzy, shooting at a baseball, Bugs removes his disguise and questions Daffy about which season it really is. Daffy, thinking that he's out of danger, admits that it's actually duck season, prompting a synchronized volley of shots from concealed hunters. Defeated and angry, Daffy pronounces Bugs "despicable".

== Cast ==
- Mel Blanc as Bugs Bunny and Daffy Duck
- Arthur Q. Bryan as Elmer Fudd

== Reception ==
In a commentary by Eric Goldberg, he cites the short as his favorite in the hunting trilogy. Goldberg praises the setting, describing it as "Maurice Noble's beautiful snowscape", reasoning "it makes the action read that much cleaner". When discussing the whole hunting trilogy, Forrest Wickman at Slate states "The formula is simple, but what makes the cartoons classics are the small variations in execution." Wickman praises the various ways Daffy is shot.

Animation historian David Gerstein writes, "Duck! Rabbit, Duck! succeeds because the exaggeration of the villain role blends perfectly with the cartoon's exaggeration of Bugs, its exaggeration of Elmer — and its exaggeration of logic. Duck! Rabbit, Duck! is a cartoon that derives its entire mood from pushing gags past conventional Looney Tunes limits."

== Home media ==
- VHS: Warner Bros. Cartoons Golden Jubilee 24-Karat Collection: Bugs Bunny's Wacky Adventures, Lethal Weapon 3 (U.K. release only)
- Laserdisc: Daffy Duck's Screen Classics: Duck Victory
- DVD: Looney Tunes Golden Collection: Volume 3
- DVD/Blu-ray: Looney Tunes Platinum Collection: Volume 2

| Preceded by Lumber Jack-Rabbit | Bugs Bunny cartoons 1953 | Succeeded by Robot Rabbit |
| Preceded by Duck Dodgers in the 24½th Century | Daffy Duck cartoons 1953 | Succeeded by Design for Leaving |
| Preceded by Rabbit of Seville | Elmer Fudd cartoons 1953 | Succeeded by Robot Rabbit |
