= Robot Rabbit =

- Directed by: I. Freleng
- Story by: Warren Foster
- Starring: Mel Blanc (Bugs Bunny; Mule); Arthur Q. Bryan (Elmer Fudd)
- Music by: Carl Stalling
- Animation by: Ken Champin; Manuel Perez; Arthur Davis; Virgil Ross
- Layouts by: Hawley Pratt
- Backgrounds by: Irv Wyner
- Color process: Technicolor
- Production company: Warner Bros. Cartoons
- Distributed by: Warner Bros. Pictures; The Vitaphone Corporation
- Release date: December 12, 1953 (USA premiere)
- Running time: 6 minutes 45 seconds
- Language: English

Robot Rabbit is a 1953 Warner Bros. Looney Tunes cartoon directed by Friz Freleng. The short was released on December 12, 1953, and stars Bugs Bunny and Elmer Fudd.

The short is considered an example of how animation of the time addressed the topic of robotization.

== Plot ==
Elmer Fudd is a carrot farmer who spots Bugs' rabbit hole, claiming that Bugs has raided his carrot farm, and decides to shoot him with a gun. Elmer shoots into Bugs' hole, unaware that Bugs is not in it. Bugs appears behind Elmer and attempts his "fake dying" act. Elmer celebrates and unwittingly starts dancing and celebrating with Bugs, until he realizes Bugs has tricked him.

This action prompts Fudd to call "ACME Pest Control" for a robot with the express purpose of evicting Bugs. The robot initially confuses a mule for a rabbit and Elmer, who was trying to explain to the robot what a rabbit looks like, for his intended target before getting the early upper hand. Bugs quickly evens the score by luring the robot under a rotating water sprinkler, causing it to rust. Furious at the robot's incompetence, Elmer oils the robot (restoring its original color) and threatens to sell it for scrap iron if it does not catch Bugs.

Later, Bugs disguises himself as a female robot (where he literally throws a wrench into their "relationship"), before finally causing the robot to follow him through a construction site and beneath a piledriver. Back at home, Elmer starts wondering how the robot fared when Bugs greets him by dumping the various parts of the robot on his doorstep.

Preceded by Duck! Rabbit, Duck!	Bugs Bunny Cartoons; 1953	Succeeded by Captain Hareblower
