= Hillbilly Hare =

1950 animated short film by Robert McKimson

- Title card
- Directed by: Robert McKimson
- Story by: Tedd Pierce
- Starring: Mel Blanc; John T. Smith (uncredited)
- Music by: Carl Stalling
- Animation by: John Carey; Phil DeLara; Emery Hawkins; Charles McKimson; Rod Scribner
- Layouts by: Cornett Wood
- Backgrounds by: Richard H. Thomas
- Color process: Technicolor
- Production company: Warner Bros. Cartoons
- Distributed by: Warner Bros. Pictures; The Vitaphone Corporation
- Release date: August 12, 1950
- Running time: 7:22
- Language: English

Hillbilly Hare is a 1950 Warner Bros. Merrie Melodies cartoon directed by Robert McKimson. The short was released on August 12, 1950 and stars Bugs Bunny.

== Plot ==
Bugs preparing to square dance with the Martin Brothers. Scene animated by Emery Hawkins.

Bugs Bunny is vacationing in the Ozarks and stumbles into the territory of two hillbilly brothers, Curt and Punkinhead Martin. The brothers mistake Bugs as being a member of the Coy clan with whom they are feuding and make several attempts to shoot him. Bugs foils them each time. Curt and Punkinhead are determined to get revenge on Bugs for their humiliation; Bugs easily outsmarts them and eventually, dressed as an attractive hillbilly girl, tricks them into doing a square dance. The dance tune starts as a straightforward version of "Skip to My Lou" played and called by the jukebox band, "The Sow Belly Trio". Shortly after, Bugs removes the dress, dons a hillbilly hat, deliberately unplugs the jukebox and seamlessly takes over fiddling and calling the square dance. He continues to follow the beat and rhythm of the song while manipulating the Martins through a series of slapstick comedy gags. Bugs proceeds to assign the Martins increasingly bizarre and violent directives, which the brothers unquestioningly follow with hilarious results. Finally, with the Martins having promenaded off a cliff, Bugs finishes the dance by having the Martins groggily bow to each other (before collapsing due to exhaustion from the whole "dance") and saying, "And THAT is all!" and playing six final notes on the fiddle before the cartoon ends.

== Voice cast ==
- Mel Blanc as Bugs Bunny, Curt Martin
- John T. Smith as Punkinhead Martin, Sow Belly Trio Caller

== Censorship ==
- This cartoon saw major editing when aired on ABC due to violent content. The following scenes were edited out:
  - The scene where Bugs mistakes Curt's gun for a camera and has his carrot shot full of holes;
  - The scene where Curt unties his rifle barrel, gets blasted in the face;
  - The scene where Bugs meets up with Punkinhead and Bugs reverses the gun barrel so that the second hillbilly is blown up;
  - The aftermath of the explosion in the dynamite shack sequence where Curt comes out with Bugs' lit lighter and says, "I think y'all are usin' too strong a fluid!";
  - The line during the square-dance ending that goes: Grab a fence post, hold it tight/Whomp yer partner wit' all yer might/Hit 'im in the shin, hit 'im in the head/Hit 'im again, the critter ain't dead/Whomp 'im low an' Whomp 'im high/Stick yer finger in his eye/Pretty li'l rhythm, pretty li'l sound/Bang yer head against the ground (and the ensuing comic violence that follows).

Despite the cartoon being a product of its time in regard to broadcast violence, it is occasionally shown, wholly unedited and without any disclaimer, on MeTV's Toon In with Me and on MeTV Toons' various scheduled cartoon matinée shows.

== Appearance in pop culture ==
The hillbillies in Hillbilly Hare have appeared in the DC Looney Tunes comic book series and had a cameo along with Bugs in the Histeria! episode "Great Heroes of France". They also make a brief cameo in Space Jam (they are briefly seen with the other Looney Tunes characters watching the basketball game between the Tune Squad and the Monstars). They are also part of the characters in the television series New Looney Tunes.

== Reception ==
Animation historian Mike Mallory writes, "With Hillbilly Hare, director Robert McKimson, story man Tedd Pierce, and composer Carl Stalling combined to create a comedic perfect storm: the picture without the soundtrack is funny; the soundtrack without the picture is funny; and the music by itself is funny...What elevates Hillbilly Hare to the top rank of Looney Tunes cartoons is its second half: a relentless, hilariously insane square dance called by Bugs (channeling the Western swing musician Bob Wills). The rabbit's instructions are religiously carried out by the hillbillies, who bludgeon each other senseless in the process. This three-minute crescendo of slapstick is one of the greatest sustained pieces of comedy ever drawn." The gag of Bugs Bunny refixing his opponent's gun so it will literally backfire is seen in Pre-Hysterical Hare (1958).

Months after the short's release, a letter from Warren, Pennsylvania was sent to the studio, requesting for Bugs' square dancing calls that were used during the film's climax. McKimson also considered putting the short up for an Academy Award for Best Animated Short Film; however, producer Edward Selzer refused to submit it for consideration.

== Home media ==
- Hillbilly Hare is available (uncensored and uncut) on Looney Tunes Golden Collection: Volume 3, Disc 1, and Looney Tunes Platinum Collection: Volume 3, Disc 1.
- A shortened version featuring just the square dance is available on WB Kids' channel on YouTube.

| Preceded by 8 Ball Bunny | Bugs Bunny Cartoons; 1950 | Succeeded by Bunker Hill Bunny |
