= Rocket Squad =

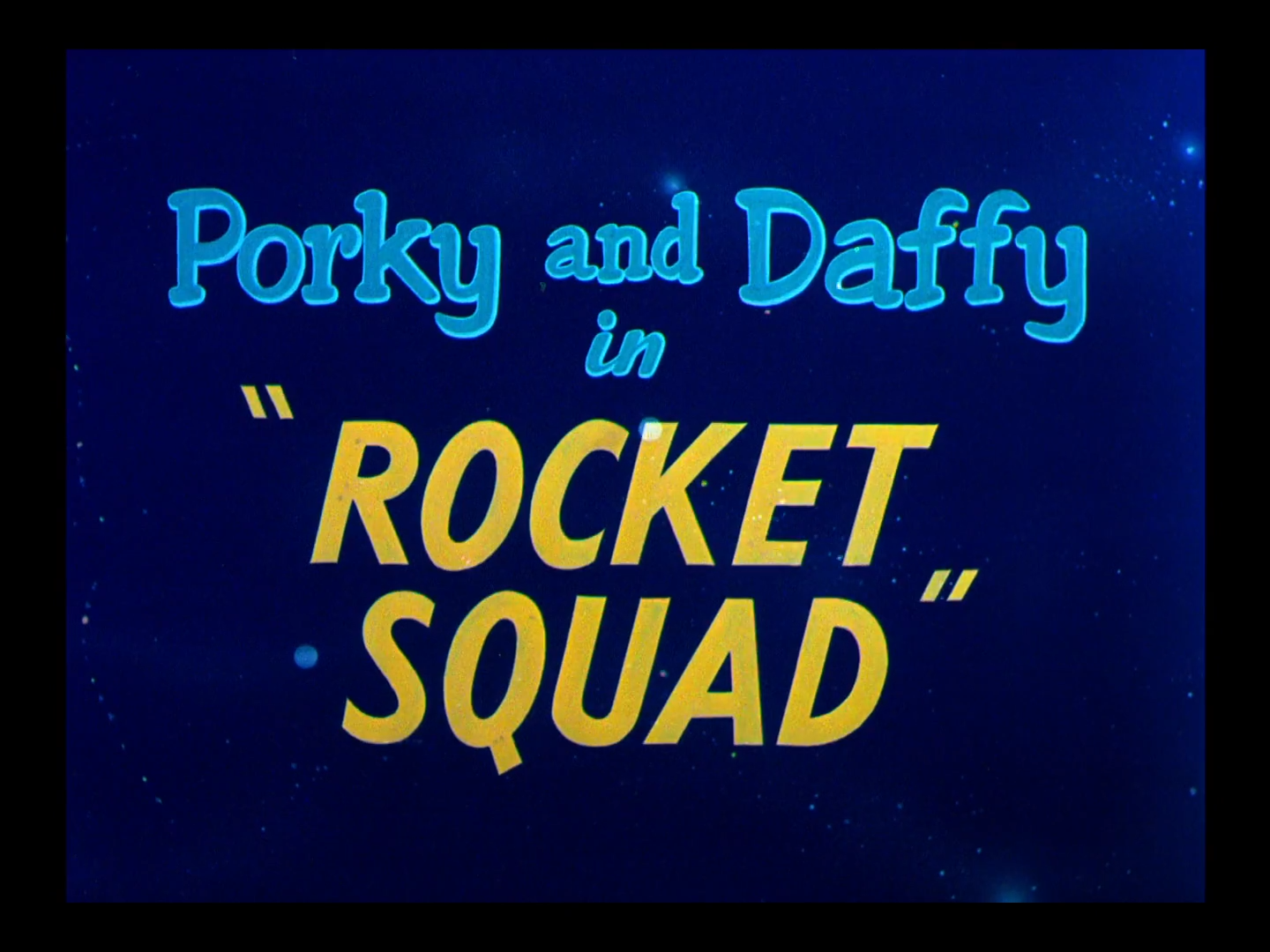
- Title card
- Directed by: Chuck Jones
- Story by: Tedd Pierce
- Starring: Mel Blanc (all voices)
- Narrated by: Mel Blanc
- Music by: Milt Franklyn
- Animation by: Ken Harris; Richard Thompson; Abe Levitow; Ben Washam
- Layouts by: Ernie Nordli
- Backgrounds by: Philip De Guard
- Color process: Technicolor
- Production company: Warner Bros. Cartoons
- Distributed by: Warner Bros. Pictures; The Vitaphone Corporation
- Release date: March 10, 1956 (U.S.)
- Running time: 6:35
- Language: English

Rocket Squad is a 1956 Warner Bros. Merrie Melodies cartoon directed by Chuck Jones. The short was released on March 10, 1956, and stars Daffy Duck and Porky Pig as futuristic space cops who patrol the Milky Way Galaxy. The police officers of the film are sued for false arrest, and the film ends with their imprisonment.

== Plot ==
In this futuristic setting, Daffy Duck is Sgt. Joe Monday and narrator of the story. His partner, Det. Schmoe Tuesday (Porky Pig), and himself are returning from a routine investigation of a 712-malicious mischief ('School children blew one of the rings off of Saturn. When will parents learn to keep uranium out of their children's reach?') in the Big Dipper area, when they receive a call from the police chief. They return to headquarters and await the police chief's call ('10:52: Back at the old desk, waiting for a call from the Chief. Half a cop's life is spent in waiting. 10:53: the Chief called.'). The police chief is down on his knees as he practically begs Daffy to pursue the Flying Saucer Bandit. Daffy consents to take the case, and the police chief kisses his feet.

Sgt. Monday and Det. Tuesday then report to the scene of the crime. The crime robots are already there picking up clues to aid Daffy and Porky in their ability to identify the Flying Saucer Bandit. They return to the station with a bag of clues, and empty them into the Univac clue machine, which pops out what appears to be a computer punch card. The punch card is loaded into a player piano, which plays out the song "Mother Machree", identified by Daffy. They proceed to the George 'Mother' Machree file where they begin their pursuit of the Flying Saucer Bandit. Daffy describes him as "A criminal so clever, he had never been suspected of anything!"

They learn that the Flying Saucer Bandit is at a restaurant ordering a sandwich ('a pastrami on rye with mustard'), to which they hurry because he is known as a 'notoriously fast eater'. Upon arriving, they realize they have missed the bandit, and continue their chase ('1:07: He left the Blast-Inn. 1:08: We arrived at the Blast-Inn. Our deductions later proved that we had missed him by one minute. 1:09: We set out in pursuit.'). Porky and Daffy are in hot pursuit of 'Mother' Machree when they lose him in a smog bank over Los Angeles. Porky points out a smog cloud flying away, when they pull up and tell Machree to come out, to which Daffy mentions that he has an elaborate alibi already cooked up.

It turns out that Machree is innocent, evident by his "I didn't do nothin'!" alibi. Because of this, Daffy and Porky are sentenced by the Ultra Superior Court to twenty years in prison for false arrest (thirty years actually, as Porky states so afterwards).

== Production notes ==
Rocket Squad is a futuristic parody of the television shows Dragnet and Racket Squad.

Daffy and Porky's characters first names put together are 'Joe Schmoe' (Sgt. Joe Monday and Det. Schmoe Tuesday ("He always follows me," declares Joe.)

Much of the imagery, particularly entering the police station and the evaporators, is reused from Jones' previous short, Duck Dodgers in the 24½th Century.

Among the names appearing on the buttons of the Criminal Detector Set are John Burton Jr., Tedd Pierce, C.M. Jones, Mel Blanc, Norman Moray and Eddie Selzer, all of whom had a hand in the making of the cartoon (Moray was a key executive with The Vitaphone Corporation, Warner Bros'. short-subject division).

Porky and Daffy losing the Flying Saucer Bandit in a smog bank over Los Angeles is in reference to Los Angeles being considered the Smog Bank Capital of the world in the early to late 1950s.

This cartoon has been shown (in clips) on the PBS special Chuck Jones: Extremes and Inbetweens—A Life in Animation as part of the section about Jones using Porky and Daffy in cartoon shorts that parody popular film and television show genres of the era.

== Home media ==
The short was released on disc 3 of the Looney Tunes Golden Collection: Volume 3 DVD set.

== See also ==
- List of American films of 1956
- List of cartoons featuring Daffy Duck
- List of cartoons featuring Porky Pig
