= Rhapsody in Rivets =

1941 film by Isadore Freleng

- Original title card
- Directed by: Isadore Freleng
- Story by: Michael Maltese
- Produced by: Leon Schlesinger
- Music by: Carl W. Stalling
- Animation by: Gil Turner
- Color process: Technicolor
- Production company: Leon Schlesinger Productions
- Distributed by: Warner Bros. Pictures
- Release date: December 6, 1941
- Running time: 8 min
- Country: United States
- Language: English

Rhapsody in Rivets is a 1941 American animated comedy short film directed by Isadore Freleng. The short was released on December 6, 1941. It is part of the Merrie Melodies series. It was re-released as a "Blue Ribbon" reissue in 1947 and 1954, rendering the original film lost. Michael Maltese kept the original title cels.

== Plot ==
At a busy urban construction site in a world of anthropomorphic animals, an appreciative crowd of gawkers watches the foreman (a caricature of the conductor Leopold Stokowski) use the building plans as his score and conduct the workmen in Franz Liszt's "Hungarian Rhapsody No. 2", a symphony of riveting, hammering, sawing, and more. Elevators, picks, shovels, and a steam shovel are instruments in music making and construction.

As the clock nears 5:00 PM, the crew works furiously, and the building rises around the clouds. With a flag planted at the top and the work completed, the foreman takes a bow. One of the workers, while leaving, slams the door shut behind him; due to this and the overly hurried construction, the building (labeled the "Umpire State") comes crashing down. The foreman attempts to attack the worker in retaliation, but three bricks hit him on the head for the last three notes, ending the rhapsody and the cartoon.

== Reception ==
Daniel Goldmark writes, "While almost every studio in Hollywood took on Liszt's 'Second Hungarian Symphony' at one time or another, Warner Bros. did it twice — both times with Friz Freleng directing. (Rhapsody Rabbit, 1946, was the other.) What sets this version apart from all the others is that, while it keeps the spirit of a concert or performance, the execution is different. Freleng's central metaphor — comparing the skills and coordination of a construction crew to those of an orchestra — works remarkably well, giving a new twist to what had already become a cliché by then, a well-known classical work being played (or murdered) by a motley group of musicians. And because the 'Rhapsody' was also a classical standard, bordering on a pop hit, Freleng could easily use just the best-known parts of the work to drive the several dozen gags."

== Home media ==
- LaserDisc - The Golden Age of Looney Tunes, Vol. 1, Side 6: Friz Freleng
- VHS - The Golden Age of Looney Tunes, Vol. 6: Friz Freleng
- (1992) LaserDisc - Rhapsody in Blue
- (1999) VHS - Looney Tunes: The Collectors Edition Volume 5: Musical Masterpieces (1995 Turner dubbed version)
- (2007) DVD - The Bride Came C.O.D. (1995 Turner dubbed version, added as a bonus)
- DVD - Warner Bros. Home Entertainment Academy Awards Animation Collection, Disc 2
- Blu-Ray, DVD - Looney Tunes Platinum Collection: Volume 3, Disc 2
- (2015) DVD - Looney Tunes Musical Masterpieces

== See also ==
- Rhapsody Rabbit
