= John F. Barth =

American composer (1874–1947)

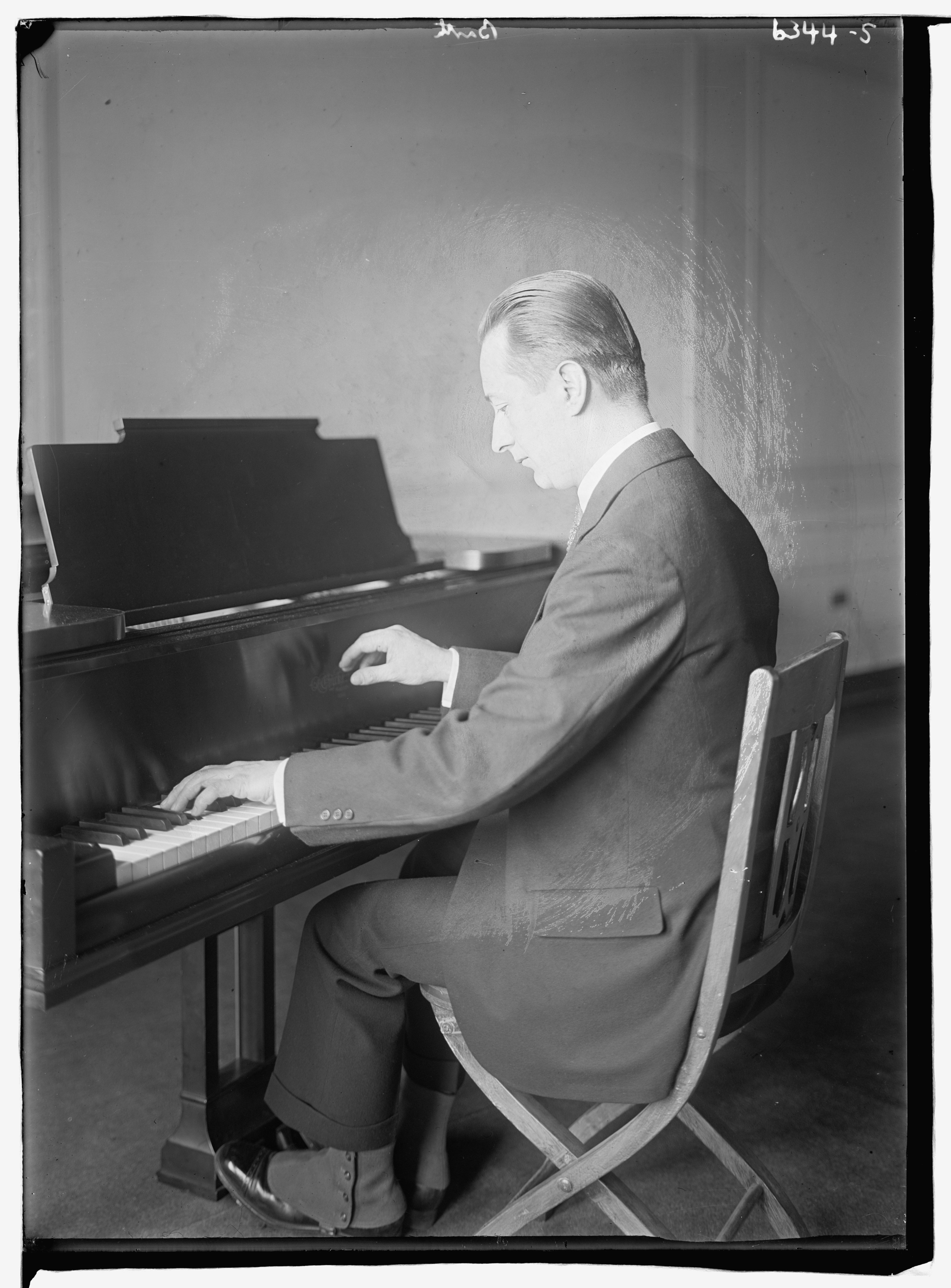
Barth LCCN2014718102

John F. Barth (1874–1947) was an American composer of popular music.

His most popular composition was the college march "Frat" (1910). It was used in the score of many Warner Bros. cartoons. Barth's other college-related compositions included "Rooters" (1911), "School Days" (1912), and "Sorority March" (1913). Barth produced several ragtime compositions including "Ma' Rag-Time Queen" (1902), "Foxy Sam" (1903), "Rambling Mose" (1903), and "Tobaggan Rag" (1912). Other Barth compositions were "Yellow Kid" (1897), "You're as Pretty as a Picture" (1907), "Pretty as a Picture" (1910), "Spooning in the Moonlight" (1910), "Moonlight Meditations" (1911), "Moon-Glow" (1919), "You and Your Smile" (1919), and "Fed Up and Far From Home" (1941), which was originally written by John Frederic Barth in 1910, and published in Cleveland by Sam Fox Publishing. In 1941, Keith Prowse Music dusted off the old melody and asked Fred Godfrey to write new lyrics.
