= Bunker Hill Bunny =

1950 Looney Tunes short directed by Friz Freleng

- Lobby card
- Directed by: I. Freleng
- Story by: Tedd Pierce
- Starring: Mel Blanc
- Music by: Carl Stalling
- Animation by: Gerry Chiniquy; Ken Champin; Virgil Ross; Arthur Davis
- Layouts by: Hawley Pratt
- Backgrounds by: Paul Julian
- Color process: Technicolor
- Production company: Warner Bros. Cartoons
- Distributed by: Warner Bros. Pictures; The Vitaphone Corporation
- Release date: September 23, 1950 (United States)
- Running time: 7:20
- Country: United States
- Language: English

Bunker Hill Bunny is a 1950 Warner Bros. Merrie Melodies theatrical cartoon short directed by Friz Freleng and written by Tedd Pierce. The short was released on September 23, 1950 and stars Bugs Bunny and Yosemite Sam as a Hessian mercenary in the American Revolution.

== Plot ==
The story opens with a title card indicating a time setting of 1776, before switching to footages of the Battle of Bunker Hill and the Siege of Yorktown. The scene then transitions to the "Battle of Bagle Heights", where Bugs, dressed as an American Minuteman, is defending a wooden fort against the red-coated Sam von Schamm (or Schmamm), the Hessian, attacking from a large stone fortress. Sam's fortress is heavily armored, bristling with artillery; by contrast, Bugs' defenses are rather pathetic, with only one cannon.

Even then, Sam is the only one manning his fort, which makes capturing Bugs' difficult, considering the rabbit is able to retaliate by capturing his simultaneously. Sam attempts to continue his bombardment, but Bugs is able to put up a defense by simply catching his opponent's cannonballs with his own cannon and firing them back. When Bugs tires of that contest, he fires a large cork to plug Sam's main mortar. Sam is shot in the face by his own cannon while trying to remove the cork.

Frustrated, Sam burrows his way under his base and into Bugs' base using a pickaxe. Upon surfacing, Sam lights a match, only to find himself in a room full of TNT. An explosion occurs in a shack where the room is, with Sam stumbling out, dazed.

As the last gambit, Sam uses a keg of gunpowder in an attempt to blow up Bugs' base; unbeknownst to Sam, gunpowder falls into his back pocket due to a hole in the keg, creating a trail of gunpowder. After Sam lights the fuse, Bugs, sitting on the powder keg and munching a carrot, calmly extinguishes it and nonchalantly lights the trail of gunpowder left by Sam. Fleeing from the inevitable trail, Sam runs away from the base and up an apple tree, which eventually explodes on him.

At this setback, a thoroughly defeated Sam declares himself a "Hessian without no aggression," and decides to defect to the rebels by saying, "If you can't beat 'em, join 'em." To this, Bugs and Sam march side by side in a fife-and-drum march reminiscent of the Archibald Willard painting The Spirit of '76, playing the song The Girl I Left Behind Me.

== Cast ==
- Mel Blanc as Bugs Bunny and Yosemite Sam

== In popular culture ==
=== The Yosemite Sam Shortwave Radio Transmission ===
On December 19, 2004, a possible numbers station began transmitting from the desert on the Laguna Indian Pueblo near Albuquerque, New Mexico, USA, using one of the quotes from the episode which is Yosemite Sam threatening Bugs Bunny: ""Varmint, I'm a-gonna b-b-b-bloooow ya ta'smithereenies!"". Prior to the quote, the station would use the sound of a buzzer (an 8-second data burst similar to the Russian numbers station UVB-76) later followed by the quote. This was later nicknamed the "Yosemite Sam Transmission". On December 23, 2004, the station ceased transmission for two months, before returning in February 2005 with additional frequencies on FM Radio (WWV and WWVH); but, after the site where the broadcast was being transmitted was identified, the station ceased transmission for the second time, and this time for good. The station transmitted on the frequencies: 3,700 kHz, 4,300 kHz, 6,500 kHz and 10,500 kHz. The station was later revealed to be run by the Mobility Assessment Test and Integration Center (MATIC). The location of the broadcast also suggested that it was a reference to a Bugs Bunny quote: "I knew I should have taken that left turn, at Albuquerque!".

== See also ==
- List of Bugs Bunny cartoons
- List of Yosemite Sam cartoons

Preceded by Hillbilly Hare	Bugs Bunny Cartoons; 1950	Succeeded by Bushy Hare
