= Gonzales' Tamales =

- Title card
- Directed by: Friz Freleng
- Written by: Warren Foster
- Starring: Mel Blanc
- Edited by: Treg Brown
- Music by: Milt Franklyn; Carl Stalling
- Animation by: Gerry Chiniquy; Arthur Davis; Virgil Ross
- Layouts by: Hawley Pratt
- Backgrounds by: Boris Gorelick
- Color process: Technicolor
- Production company: Warner Bros. Cartoons
- Distributed by: Warner Bros. Pictures
- Release date: November 30, 1957
- Running time: 6:20
- Language: English

Gonzales' Tamales is a Warner Bros. Looney Tunes animated film directed by Friz Freleng, released on November 30, 1957, starring Speedy Gonzales and Sylvester. Unlike most Speedy Gonzales shorts where he is admired and sometimes befriended by other mice, Speedy is seen as an outcast in this short.

== Plot ==
The majority of the male mice in a Mexican village lament the fact that Speedy Gonzales has been getting in between them and the "pretty girls." One of the mice suggests that they get the "gringo pussycat" Sylvester to chase Speedy out of town. The mice forge a note from Speedy, stating that he will pull Sylvester's tail out by the roots, which Speedy happily does when confronted by the cat.

In trying to get Speedy, Sylvester first uses a shotgun and then a hand grenade (as Speedy sings La Cucaracha in Spanish, complete with the lyric about the cockroach not having any marijuana to smoke), with the usual disastrous results. Speedy, however, falls for the cat's final attempt: A wind-up female mouse doll. With Sylvester hot on his feet, Speedy grabs the wind-up toy and takes refuge in a box of red hot peppers—forcing the hungry pussycat to eat them one by one in order to find the resourceful rodent.

In between each ingestion of pepper, Sylvester runs to a nearby water cooler for relief. On his last trip to the cooler, he fails to notice that Speedy has substituted tabasco sauce for the water—which sends the cat 500 mi (800 km) high into the horizon.

== Home media ==
This short is available on disc 4 of Looney Tunes Golden Collection: Volume 3 and disc 2 of Looney Tunes Collector's Vault: Volume 1.
