= The Windblown Hare =

- Title card
- Directed by: Robert McKimson
- Story by: Warren Foster
- Starring: Mel Blanc; Bea Benaderet (uncredited); Jim Backus (uncredited)
- Music by: Carl W. Stalling
- Animation by: Charles McKimson; Phil DeLara; Manny Gould; John Carey
- Layouts by: Cornett Wood
- Backgrounds by: Richard H. Thomas
- Color process: Technicolor
- Production company: Warner Bros. Cartoons
- Distributed by: Warner Bros. Pictures; The Vitaphone Corporation
- Release date: August 27, 1949
- Running time: 7:09
- Language: English

The Windblown Hare is a Warner Bros. Looney Tunes animated short directed by Robert McKimson. The short was released on August 27, 1949, and stars Bugs Bunny. The title, another pun on "hair", refers to Bugs being subjected to the Wolf's "blowing the houses down".

== Plot ==
The Three Little Pigs, reading their story in a fairy tale book, decide to sell their straw and wooden houses to avoid the Big Bad Wolf's wrath. Bugs Bunny falls for their scheme and buys the straw house, only for the Wolf to blow it down. Bugs then purchases the wooden house but faces the same fate. Seeking revenge, Bugs disguises himself as Little Red Riding Hood and tricks the Wolf into disrupting his own story.

As Bugs confronts the Wolf at Grandma's house, they engage in a battle of wits and physical comedy. Bugs eventually confronts the Wolf about blowing down his houses, upon which the Wolf straighten things out and says they belonged to the Pigs and he was just following the book. Realizing that they've both been tricked, Bugs and the Wolf arrive at the Pigs' brick house. Despite the Wolf thinking he can't blow it down, Bugs tells him to do so. While the Pigs mock the Wolf, he blows at the house, only for it to explode. Overjoyed, the Wolf exclaims he did it, much to the Pigs' shock. Nearby, Bugs takes the credit, having used TNT to destroy the house, and laughs mischievously.

== Additional crew ==
- Film Edited by: Treg Brown
- Uncredited Orchestration by: Milt Franklyn

== Home media ==
The Windblown Hare is available on the Looney Tunes Golden Collection: Volume 3 DVD set, and on the Looney Tunes Collector's Vault: Volume 3 Blu-ray set.

== See also ==
- Bugs Bunny filmography
- Looney Tunes and Merrie Melodies filmography (1940–1949)

| Preceded by The Grey Hounded Hare | The Windblown Hare; 1949 | Succeeded by Frigid Hare |
