= What's Up, Doc? (1950 film) =

1950 animated short film by Robert McKimson

- Directed by: Robert McKimson
- Story by: Warren Foster
- Starring: Mel Blanc
- Music by: Carl Stalling
- Animation by: J.C. Melendez; Charles McKimson; Phil DeLara; Wilson Burness
- Layouts by: Cornett Wood
- Backgrounds by: Richard H. Thomas
- Color process: Technicolor
- Production company: Warner Bros. Cartoons
- Distributed by: Warner Bros. Pictures; The Vitaphone Corporation
- Release date: June 17, 1950
- Running time: 7:15
- Language: English

What's Up, Doc? is a Looney Tunes cartoon directed by Robert McKimson and produced by Warner Bros. Cartoons. It was released by Warner Bros. Pictures on June 17, 1950, and stars Bugs Bunny and Elmer Fudd.

== Plot ==
While relaxing poolside, Bugs Bunny engages in a retrospective discussion about his ascent to fame during a phone interview. Bugs traces his journey from early artistic endeavors to his eventual breakthrough in the entertainment industry.

Bugs is a rabbit navigating a human-dominated world. Displaying early aptitude in both piano and ballet, he embarks on a professional pursuit of stardom, initially finding himself relegated to chorus roles in Broadway productions. A turning point arises when Bugs is offered a leading role in a show due to the sudden illness of its star. Despite his agreement to fill the vacancy, Bugs's performance falls short of expectations, resulting in his dismissal from the stage. Disenchanted with the prospect of returning to chorus work, Bugs withdraws from the limelight until an opportunity presents itself.

During a winter spent amidst fellow struggling actors in Central Park, Bugs encounters Elmer Fudd. Recognizing Bugs's potential, Fudd offers him a role as his sidekick in a vaudeville act. They embark on a nationwide tour, with Fudd delivering punchlines to Bugs's comedic antics. However, Bugs grows weary of being the recipient of Fudd's jokes and takes matters into his own hands by delivering the punchlines himself. This unexpected turn garners enthusiastic reception from audiences, leading to widespread acclaim and an invitation from Warner Bros. for screen tests.

Following a successful audition alongside Fudd, Bugs secures a contract with Warner Bros. and transitions into a film career. As Bugs reflects on his journey during the interview, he realizes he is running late for his first film role, which casts him as a chorus boy once again, which he performs with a sour expression.

== Notes ==
- Bugs turns down dozens of scripts, including one entitled Life with Father. Bugs predicts: "Ehhh…this will never be a hit." It actually ran for 3,224 performances on Broadway from 1939 to 1947, making it the longest-running non-musical play in Broadway history (and, as of when this cartoon was made in 1950, the longest running Broadway show of any kind).
- Al Jolson, Jack Benny, Eddie Cantor and Bing Crosby, major stars of that time, are caricatured as park bums, who each do their routine when Elmer Fudd shows up. Elmer spots Bugs and asks, "Why are you hanging around these guys? They'll never amount to anything!"

== Home media ==
The cartoon was released on the Looney Tunes Golden Collection: Volume 1 DVD set and the Bugs Bunny 80th Anniversary Collection Blu-ray set, and as a bonus on the Cats Don't Dance Blu-ray released by Warner Archive in September 2023.

== See also ==
- What's Up, Doc?, a 1972 comedy film starring Barbra Streisand and Ryan O'Neal (which closes with a clip from this cartoon).
- What's Up Doc?, a UK Saturday morning children's show in the early 1990s

Preceded by Big House Bunny	Bugs Bunny Cartoons; 1950	Succeeded by 8 Ball Bunny
