= Frigid Hare =

1949 film by Chuck Jones

- Title card
- Directed by: Charles M. Jones
- Story by: Michael Maltese
- Starring: Mel Blanc
- Music by: Carl Stalling
- Animation by: Phil Monroe; Ben Washam; Lloyd Vaughan; Ken Harris
- Layouts by: Robert Gribbroek
- Backgrounds by: Peter Alvarado
- Color process: Technicolor
- Production company: Warner Bros. Cartoons
- Distributed by: Warner Bros. Pictures; The Vitaphone Corporation
- Release date: October 8, 1949 (U.S.)
- Running time: 7:36
- Language: English

Frigid Hare is a Warner Bros. Merrie Melodies short, released on October 8, 1949. It is directed by Chuck Jones and written by Michael Maltese, and features Bugs Bunny. The title can be seen as a pun on "frigid air" or the refrigerator brand "Frigidaire".

== Plot ==
While en route to Miami Beach for a much-needed break from Warner Brothers, Bugs Bunny once again misses his turn at Albuquerque and finds himself at the South Pole. After encountering a penguin fleeing from an Eskimo hunter, Bugs gets entangled in their chase. Despite initially trying to ditch the penguin, Bugs eventually takes pity on him and devises a plan to rescue him.

In the end, after the Eskimo is neutralized, Bugs prepares to leave, but stops when the penguin becomes sad. After being informed that the South Pole's six-month-long days allow him to enjoy a break until July 1953, Bugs decides to extend his vacation.

== Home media ==
- Frigid Hare is available, uncut and restored, on the third disc of Looney Tunes Golden Collection: Volume 1 (2003).
- Frigid Hare is available, uncut and restored, on the second disc of Looney Tunes Collector's Vault: Volume 2 (2026).

== See also ==
- Bugs Bunny filmography
- Looney Tunes and Merrie Melodies filmography (1940–1949)

Preceded by The Windblown Hare	Bugs Bunny Cartoons; 1949	Succeeded by Which Is Witch
