= Jumpin' Jupiter =

- Title card
- Directed by: Charles M. Jones
- Story by: Michael Maltese
- Starring: Mel Blanc
- Music by: Carl Stalling
- Animation by: Ken Harris; Abe Levitow; Richard Thompson; Keith Darling; Harry Love (special animation effects)
- Layouts by: Robert Givens
- Backgrounds by: Philip DeGuard
- Color process: Technicolor
- Production company: Warner Bros. Cartoons
- Distributed by: Warner Bros. Pictures
- Release date: August 6, 1955
- Running time: 7:00
- Language: English

Jumpin' Jupiter is a 1955 Warner Bros. Merrie Melodies cartoon directed by Chuck Jones. The short was released on August 6, 1955 and stars Porky Pig and Sylvester.

It is the third and last of a series of comedy horror-themed cartoons that starred the duo, with the other two being Scaredy Cat (1948) and Claws for Alarm (1954). They all had the running theme of Porky and Sylvester settling down for the night in a location that was dangerous, with Porky being oblivious and Sylvester being aware and trying to alert Porky, but only succeeding in annoying him. It is also the final cartoon in the golden age of American animation featuring Porky before he is permanently paired with Daffy Duck.

This entry sees Porky and Sylvester camping in the desert and being abducted by an alien from Jupiter.

== Plot ==
Porky and Sylvester are camping in the desert in the Superstition Mountains. As they prepare to settle down for the night, Sylvester (who is already frightened merely by the location) suddenly hears a howl that causes him to wrap himself around Porky for safety. An annoyed Porky peels him off and points out that the sound was from a coyote howling at the Moon. Porky then forces the cat to sleep outside while he himself sleeps in his tent.

Suddenly, a UFO carrying a tall, birdlike alien from the planet Jupiter arrives on Earth, with his mission being to collect some "animal Life" for an experiment. After sizing up the samples he finds (Sylvester and the tent with Porky inside), the alien maneuvers his spacecraft to a position where it is able to bore through the ground and remove his specimens in one round slice, which is carried off on top of the UFO.

Once in space, but still within the pull of Earth's gravity, Porky wakes up extremely cold. He gets himself a blanket, remarking to himself as he passes the open tent flap that "the stars are so bright tonight you can almost touch them." In due course, the alien comes out to take a look at Sylvester, who is waking up. The alien clamps his hand on the cat's head and turns it so they are looking right at each other. Naturally, Sylvester is terrified and races into the tent and into Porky's bed. Porky angrily demands to know what's going on, to which Sylvester mimics the alien, which results in him being thrown out of the tent that he nearly falls off the edge of the spacecraft. Scared out of his wits, Sylvester ends up in the alien's arms. Then, realizing where he is, he scrams back into Porky's tent and hides under the bed.

The alien eventually arrives to the tent opening, and Sylvesters points him out to Porky. However, Porky mistakes the alien for a Navajo Native American and tells him to go back in his 'wigwam', on the supposed pretense he and Sylvester will look at his 'beads and trinkets' in the morning. Confused, the alien goes back inside the UFO to get some pointers on his specimens from a book entitled Denizens of the Planet Earth and Their Behavior. The spacecraft then leaves Earth's gravity, so at this point everything begins floating. Porky, again waking up cold, gets up to have a drink of water, but notices nothing amiss before going back to sleep. Sylvester realizes that they are floating in space and begins to pray. Shortly, they, their car, their campfire and two cacti land on an alien world. Porky wakes up declaring, "What a wonderful sleep."

Outside the tent, Porky comments on the "beautiful morning" and says to Sylvester, "Things sure look different after a good night's sleep, eh Sylvester?" He sees Earth in the sky, but fails to recognize it. Porky suggests that they should easily make Albuquerque by that night, as he obliviously drives between two giant bird-like aliens who are observing him and Sylvester, who is cowering in the back of the car.

== Home media ==
Jumpin' Jupiter is available on disc 1 of the Looney Tunes Golden Collection: Volume 6 DVD set, on disc 2 of the Looney Tunes Collector's Vault: Volume 2 Blu-ray set.

== In other media ==
- The "Instant Martians" are reused in Hare-Way to the Stars (1958) where the version of the aliens appears with a different coloring.
