= Scaredy Cat =

1948 film by Chuck Jones

- Original title card
- Directed by: Charles M. Jones
- Story by: Michael Maltese
- Starring: Mel Blanc
- Music by: Carl Stalling
- Animation by: Lloyd Vaughan; Ken Harris; Phil Monroe; Ben Washam
- Layouts by: Robert Gribbroek
- Backgrounds by: Peter Alvarado
- Color process: Technicolor
- Production company: Warner Bros. Cartoons
- Distributed by: Warner Bros. Pictures; The Vitaphone Corporation
- Release dates: December 18, 1948 (US); June 2, 1956 (US reissue)
- Running time: 7:25
- Language: English

Scaredy Cat is a 1948 Warner Bros. Merrie Melodies cartoon directed by Chuck Jones. The short was released on December 18, 1948, and stars Porky Pig and Sylvester the Cat. The cartoon is notable in that it marks the first time the name "Sylvester" is used for the popular feline character. In previous shorts, the cat is unnamed, except for in the 1947 cartoon Tweetie Pie in which he is referred to as "Thomas".

This is the first of three comedy horror-themed cartoons that starred the duo, with the other two being Claws for Alarm (1954) and Jumpin' Jupiter (1955). They all had the running theme of Porky and Sylvester settling down for the night in a location that was dangerous, with Porky being oblivious and Sylvester being aware and trying to alert Porky, but only succeeding in annoying him.

== Plot ==
Porky purchases a new home from a real estate agent, which turns out to be an old Gothic-style house. His pet cat Sylvester is frightened by the creepy-looking place, but Porky finds it "quaint" and "peaceful" and looks forward to his first night there. Sylvester gets spooked by a bat and jumps inside Porky's coat, and Porky chastises him by pointing out that the bat is harmless before declaring that he is going upstairs to bed while Sylvester will sleep in the kitchen.

Unknown to Porky, Sylvester clings to him all the way to the bedroom and into bed. When Porky discovers him in the bed, he kicks him down the stairs, telling him to stay in the kitchen. Suddenly, Sylvester sees that the house is overrun with murderous mice who are in the process of carting off the previous owners' cat to be decapitated by a mouse wearing a black hood and holding an executioner's ax. Terrified, Sylvester races upstairs and hides in Porky's nightshirt. Sylvester tries to explain to Porky by demonstrating (in mime) what occurred downstairs, but Porky criticizes the "ridiculous acting" and orders Sylvester back to the kitchen. Too frightened to comply, Sylvester pulls a gun from a dresser drawer and prepares to shoot himself in the head rather than face whatever fate the mice have in store for the pair. Horrified, Porky disarms Sylvester and is forced to let him share the bed in order to alleviate his trouble.

As Porky and Sylvester are sleeping, four mice push the bed out of the window, and it sticks on a pole. Porky, half-asleep and thinking it is cold in the room, asks Sylvester to close the window. Sylvester proceeds to do so, himself barely awake and walking on thin air, as the pole springs the bed back into the room. Sylvester closes a tiny curtain on a birdhouse, gets back into the bed that is not there and falls to the ground. He comes through the bedroom door with a big lump on his head. At that moment, he sees that the mice are about to drop an anvil on Porky from a crawlspace above the bed. Sylvester grabs the anvil at the last moment. Porky awakes and sees Sylvester poised above him with it in his hands. Porky questions Sylvester's intentions before dropping it on the cat's head and leading the way back to the kitchen. Descending the staircase, Sylvester sees the hooded mouse roll a bowling ball down the banister, targeted directly at Porky, who has reached the bottom. Sylvester races down the stairs and shoves Porky out of the way so hard that the pig ends up in the kitchen headfirst in a laundry basket. Meanwhile, at the base of the staircase, Sylvester teeters and then falls to the floor unconscious after his head is flattened by the bowling ball intended for Porky.

Porky storms back from the kitchen (not noticing the basket being lowered below the floor) demanding to know why Sylvester pushed him. Seeing the cat knocked out, Porky suggests it is just a ploy to gain sympathy. Over the next few scenes, as he lifts Sylvester, carries him to the kitchen and puts him in the basket, an oblivious Porky barely escapes many attempts, via several tools and weapons, by the mice to kill him. Sylvester, out cold in the basket, is lowered below the floor just after 1:00 A.M. and is raised up again just before 4:00 A.M., without the basket and with the normally black portions of his fur having turned completely pale gray. Traumatized, he makes his way to Porky's room where he startles the pig awake with his gruesome appearance. Finally at his wits' end, Porky drags him downstairs, and goes into the kitchen by himself to show Sylvester there is nothing to fear. After a few seconds of silence, Sylvester looks in the kitchen and sees the mice parading as they did earlier with the other cat, only now it is Porky who bound and gagged and on his way to be decapitated. As the mice take him away, a weeping Porky holds up a sign that reads "YOU WERE RIGHT – SYLVESTER". Sylvester is horrified and immediately flees out of the house. As he rests to catch his breath, his conscience (a miniature Sylvester wearing a wizard's robe and carrying a star-tipped wand) appears with an easel. Using the easel to draw diagrams and charts, the conscience berates Sylvester for cowardly leaving Porky to save his own skin, reminding how Porky raised him as a kitten, showing him the "comparative sizes" of a cat to a mouse, and demanding that he return to the house to take action. Reinvigorated, Sylvester grabs a tree branch for use as a weapon, then decides to use the whole tree instead and races back into the mouse-infested house to fight. He sends the hundreds of murderous mice running for their lives, much to his conscience's delight.

With the mice now all supposedly gone for good, Porky graciously apologizes to Sylvester and thanks him for saving his life. One leftover mouse (the executioner) pops out of the longcase clock behind Sylvester, wielding a large wooden mallet. Seeing this, Porky warns Sylvester to look out, but the mouse clobbers Sylvester on the head, knocking him unconscious, much to Porky's shock. The mouse then yanks off his hood, revealing that he has transformed into a Lew Lehr caricature wearing a Napoleonic-era bicorne hat. The snaggletoothed rodent then chuckles and declares, "Pussycats is the cwaziest peoples!"

== Reception ==
In Jerry Beck's 2020 compendium The 100 Greatest Looney Tunes Cartoons, animator Yvette Kaplan expresses her admiration for this short's script as well as for its pairing of Porky and Sylvester:

The enormously amusing Scaredy Cat, from director Chuck Jones and writer Mike Maltese, is a near perfect cartoon. Porky and Sylvester are a clown-and-straight-man duo on par with any you can think of. And though it's Porky, the straight man, who gets top billing in the opening title card, the wordless clown, Sylvester, steals the show...The more obvious Sylvester's torment, in fact, the more oblivious Porky becomes—and the funnier the gags.

== Home media ==
- VHS - The Looney Tunes Video Show Volume 3
- Laserdisc - Looney Tunes After Dark
- VHS - Looney Tunes: The Collector's Edition Volume 2 - "Running Amuck"
- VHS - Porky Pig (1990)
- VHS - Special Bumper Collection (Vol. 4) (U.K.)
- DVD - Looney Tunes Golden Collection: Volume 1, Disc Two (original opening and credits restored)
- DVD - Saturday Morning Cartoons: 1960s Volume 2, Disc One (part of The Porky Pig Show, without the opening and closing titles)
- DVD - Best of Warner Bros. 50 Cartoon Collection: Looney Tunes, Disc One
- DVD, Blu-ray - Looney Tunes Platinum Collection: Volume 1

== See also ==
- Porky Pig filmography
- Sylvester the Cat filmography
- Looney Tunes and Merrie Melodies filmography (1940–1949)
