= Claws for Alarm =

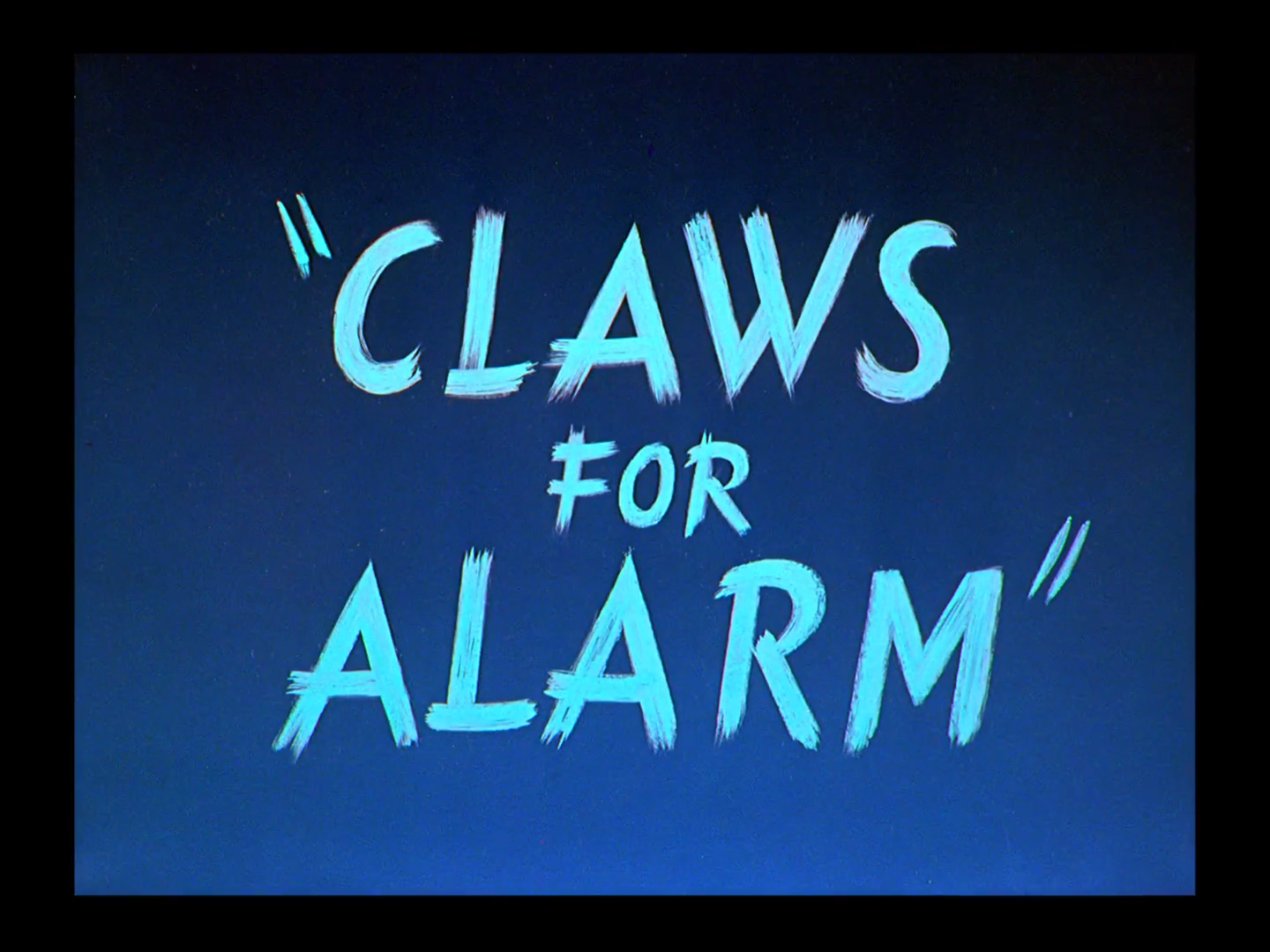
- Title card
- Directed by: Charles M. Jones
- Story by: Michael Maltese
- Starring: Mel Blanc
- Music by: Carl Stalling
- Animation by: Ken Harris; Lloyd Vaughan; Abe Levitow; Richard Thompson; Ben Washam
- Layouts by: Maurice Noble
- Backgrounds by: Philip DeGuard
- Color process: Technicolor
- Production company: Warner Bros. Cartoons
- Distributed by: Warner Bros. Pictures; The Vitaphone Corporation
- Release date: May 22, 1954 (U.S.)
- Running time: 6:49
- Language: English

Claws for Alarm is a 1954 Warner Bros. Merrie Melodies cartoon directed by Chuck Jones. The short was released on May 22, 1954 and stars Porky Pig and Sylvester.

It is the second of three comedy horror-themed cartoons teaming Porky and Sylvester, continuing his non-speaking role as Porky's pet cat in a spooky setting where only Sylvester is aware of the danger the pair are in. The other two cartoons in the series are Scaredy Cat (1948) and Jumpin' Jupiter (1955). The title is a take-off on the 1951 thriller Cause for Alarm!

== Plot ==
Porky and Sylvester are driving in the desert and reach Dry Gulch, a ghost town that is obviously sinister-looking and not at all suggestive of the 'civilization' Porky declares they have returned to after their vacation. While Porky goes on about how 'quaint and picturesque' the (abandoned) local hotel is, deciding it is 'the perfect' spot to spend the night, Sylvester is trembling with fear and literally attaching himself to Porky.

After a few scares for Sylvester on the way into the hotel, Porky signs the two of them in the register. Sylvester has become aware of the actual danger, which is from murderous mice that have taken up residence in the hotel. Unlike in Scaredy Cat, however, the mice are generally unseen, except for a few scenes including tiny, malevolent-looking pairs of eyes peering out of dark corners.

The mice begin their attempts to kill Porky and terrify Sylvester. As always, Porky does not see the danger until Sylvester has chased the mice away, leaving him holding the bag — or, as in the first major incident, the noose (intended for Porky's neck) which the mice drop from a mounted moose head above the front desk. When Porky demands to know why Sylvester has shoved him over the desk, the cat impersonates the moose head and demonstrates how the rope was dropped. Porky derides Sylvester and starts up the stairs to a room. The moose head, a shotgun protruding from its mouth, follows to the foot of the staircase, whereupon the mice inside position the gun for a shot at Porky. Sylvester pounces and, preventing the assassination, is left standing with the gun and the now-empty moose head. Porky chastises Sylvester for fighting with stuffed animals.

The two end up in Room 13. Porky settles in bed for a good night's sleep while Sylvester is curled up on a chair on high-alert. Suddenly, a noose drops from the ceiling and finds its way around Porky's neck. As the mice tighten it, Sylvester finds a razor in a suitcase, leaps on the bed and cuts the rope. Porky wants to know what the cat is doing with a noose (still around Porky's neck) and a razor. Just then, on a ledge above the bed, Sylvester spots a mouse with a kitchen knife. The mouse, a string tied around its waist, swoops down, presumably to slice off Porky's head. Sylvester shoves Porky down, out of danger, though the knife slices off a line of fur down Sylvester's back. Still unaware of what just happened, Porky gets fed up and boots Sylvester out of the hotel room.

In the hallway, a ghost appears to be coming up the stairs toward a terrified Sylvester. A shaft of moonlight reveals that the "ghost" is merely more mice standing on each other's shoulders under a white sheet. Sylvester takes refuge beneath Porky's nightcap. When Porky commands him to explain this particular behavior, Sylvester points to a white sheet floating ghost-like by the window. Porky pulls the sheet to reveal it is merely covering a chair and being gently blown by the wind. Porky does not believe Sylvester, but suggests that he may as well share the bed if he is that frightened. Shortly, a shotgun pokes through a hole in the wall. Sylvester dashes over and sticks his finger in the barrel, stifling the shot, although the bullet does pass through the tip of Porky's nightcap. Sylvester wrestles the weapon away from the mice. For the rest of the night, Sylvester performs guard-duty at the foot of the bed.

Dawn finally breaks, ending the bleary-eyed cat's vigil. Porky wakes up refreshed, happy and eager to spend 'a week or 10 days' further in the town 'to get really rested up'. This is the last straw for Sylvester, who furiously clubs Porky over the head with the shotgun as he is freshening up and singing "Home on the Range". Porky is left stiff as a board, with a big star in each eye and stuck like a skipping record on the song's line "and the deer and the antelope play".

At high-speed, Sylvester loads the car with the luggage and Porky, and roars away from the hotel and Dry Gulch. After a last look back, Sylvester breathes a sigh of relief, unaware that tiny, malevolent-looking pairs of eyes are peering out of various places in the dashboard as the cartoon ends.

== Reception ==
Some cartoon buffs view Claws for Alarm as the creepiest and darkest of the trio of cartoons centered on Porky's and Sylvester's weird vacations, noting the simpler drawings and the almost never-seen mice. Emru Townsend, writing for the online animation magazine Frames Per Second, lists Claws as one of his favorites for Halloween, and comments: "Claws for Alarm makes the cut for Halloween because, unlike in the other two cartoons, the sense of fear and dread comes in from the very first frame." Townsend also cites the "true horror-movie fashion" of the ending, where the "monsters" are not completely vanquished.

== Home video ==
This short was edited into Daffy Duck's Quackbusters (1988), and is featured in its entirety in Looney Tunes Golden Collection: Volume 3 and Looney Tunes Collector's Vault: Volume 2.
