= Looney Tunes Platinum Collection: Volume 1 =

2011 American cartoon anthology

- Blu-ray Disc cover
- Directed by: Chuck Jones, Robert McKimson, Bob Clampett, Friz Freleng, Tex Avery, Cal Dalton, Arthur Davis, Cal Howard, Abe Levitow
- Produced by: Leon Schlesinger, Eddie Selzer, John W. Burton, David H. DePatie, Friz Freleng
- Starring: voice of Mel Blanc
- Music by: Norman Spencer; Carl Stalling; Milt Franklyn; Shorty Rogers; William Lava
- Distributed by: Warner Home Video
- Release date: November 15, 2011
- Country: United States
- Language: English

Looney Tunes Platinum Collection: Volume 1 is a Blu-ray Disc and DVD box set by Warner Home Video. It was released on November 15, 2011. It contains 50 Looney Tunes and Merrie Melodies cartoons and numerous supplements. A DVD version of the box set was released on July 3, 2012, but contained no extras.

All but seven cartoons included on this volume — Lovelorn Leghorn, The Hasty Hare, Hare-Way to the Stars, Bill of Hare, A Witch's Tangled Hare, Feline Frame-Up, and Boyhood Daze — were previously restored as part of the Looney Tunes Golden Collection, the Warner Bros. Home Entertainment Academy Awards Animation Collection, or a Looney Tunes Super Stars DVD; of these seven, six are new to Blu-ray and DVD, while one (Boyhood Daze), had previously been included as an unrestored bonus cartoon on the Looney Tunes Golden Collection: Volume 6.

A second volume was released in 2012, and was followed by a third volume in 2014. In June 2025, after being out of print for several years, Warner Bros. Home Entertainment put the Blu-Ray version of Platinum Collection: Volume 1 back into print without the elaborate packing or booklet, but containing all three discs.

== Disc 1 ==
| # | Title | Characters | Year | Director | Series |
|---|---|---|---|---|---|
| 1 | Hare Tonic | Bugs, Elmer | 1945 | Chuck Jones | LT |
| 2 | Baseball Bugs | Bugs | 1946 | Friz Freleng | LT |
| 3 | Buccaneer Bunny | Bugs, Sam | 1948 | Friz Freleng | LT |
| 4 | The Old Grey Hare | Bugs, Elmer | 1944 | Bob Clampett | MM |
| 5 | Rabbit Hood | Bugs | 1949 | Chuck Jones | MM |
| 6 | 8 Ball Bunny | Bugs, Playboy | 1950 | Chuck Jones | LT |
| 7 | Rabbit of Seville | Bugs, Elmer | 1950 | Chuck Jones | LT |
| 8 | What's Opera, Doc? | Bugs, Elmer | 1957 | Chuck Jones | MM |
| 9 | The Great Piggy Bank Robbery | Daffy | 1946 | Bob Clampett | LT |
| 10 | A Pest in the House | Daffy, Elmer | 1947 | Chuck Jones | MM |
| 11 | The Scarlet Pumpernickel | Daffy, Melissa, Porky, Sylvester, Elmer (cameo), Henery (cameo), Mama Bear (cameo) | 1950 | Chuck Jones | LT |
| 12 | Duck Amuck | Daffy, Bugs (cameo) | 1953 | Chuck Jones | MM |
| 13 | Robin Hood Daffy | Daffy, Porky | 1958 | Chuck Jones | MM |
| 14 | Baby Bottleneck | Daffy, Porky | 1946 | Bob Clampett | LT |
| 15 | Kitty Kornered | Porky, Sylvester | 1946 | Bob Clampett | LT |
| 16 | Scaredy Cat | Porky, Sylvester | 1948 | Chuck Jones | MM |
| 17 | Porky Chops | Porky | 1949 | Arthur Davis | LT |
| 18 | Old Glory | Porky | 1939 | Chuck Jones | MM |
| 19 | A Tale of Two Kitties | Tweety, Babbit and Catstello | 1942 | Bob Clampett | MM |
| 20 | Tweetie Pie | Sylvester, Tweety | 1947 | Friz Freleng | MM |
| 21 | Fast and Furry-ous | Wile E. Coyote and the Road Runner | 1949 | Chuck Jones | LT |
| 22 | Beep, Beep | Wile E. Coyote and the Road Runner | 1952 | Chuck Jones | MM |
| 23 | Lovelorn Leghorn (Note: New to Blu-ray and DVD.) | Foghorn, Prissy, Barnyard | 1951 | Robert McKimson | LT |
| 24 | For Scent-imental Reasons | Penelope, Pepé | 1949 | Chuck Jones | LT |
| 25 | Speedy Gonzales | Speedy, Sylvester | 1955 | Friz Freleng | MM |

=== Special features ===
==== Behind the Tunes ====
- Wagnerian Wabbit: The Making of What's Opera, Doc?
- Twilight in Tunes: The Music of Raymond Scott
- Powerhouse in Pictures
- Putty Problems and Canary Rows
- A Chuck Jones Tutorial: Tricks of the Cartoon Trade
- The Charm of Stink: On the Scent of Pepé Le Pew

==== Alternate audio tracks ====
- Audio commentaries
  - Eric Goldberg on Baseball Bugs, Buccaneer Bunny, Rabbit Hood, Rabbit of Seville, Robin Hood Daffy, Scaredy Cat
  - Greg Ford on The Old Grey Hare
  - Jerry Beck on 8 Ball Bunny, Speedy Gonzales
  - Chuck Jones, Maurice Noble and Michael Maltese on What's Opera, Doc?
  - Daniel Goldmark on What's Opera, Doc?
  - John Kricfalusi on The Great Piggy Bank Robbery
  - Paul Dini on A Pest in the House
  - Michael Barrier and Mel Blanc on The Scarlet Pumpernickel
  - Michael Barrier and Chuck Jones on Duck Amuck
  - Michael Barrier and Bob Clampett on Baby Bottleneck, A Tale of Two Kitties
  - Michael Barrier on Kitty Kornered, Beep, Beep
  - Jerry Beck and Martha Sigall on Old Glory
  - Greg Ford and Friz Freleng on Tweetie Pie
  - Michael Barrier, Michael Maltese and Treg Brown on Fast and Furry-ous
  - Michael Barrier and Michael Maltese on For Scent-imental Reasons
- Music-only tracks include: What's Opera, Doc?, The Scarlet Pumpernickel, Duck Amuck, Robin Hood Daffy, Speedy Gonzales
- Vocal-only tracks include: What's Opera, Doc?

== Disc 2 ==
| # | Title | Characters | Year | Director | Series |
|---|---|---|---|---|---|
| 1 | One Froggy Evening | Michigan J. Frog | 1955 | Chuck Jones | MM |
| 2 | Three Little Bops | | 1957 | Friz Freleng | LT |
| 3 | I Love to Singa | | 1936 | Tex Avery | MM |
| 4 | Katnip Kollege | | 1938 | Cal Howard, Cal Dalton | MM |
| 5 | The Dover Boys at Pimento University | | 1942 | Chuck Jones | MM |
| 6 | Chow Hound | | 1951 | Chuck Jones | LT |
| 7 | Haredevil Hare | Bugs, Marvin, K-9 | 1948 | Chuck Jones | LT |
| 8 | The Hasty Hare | Bugs, Marvin, K-9 | 1952 | Chuck Jones | LT |
| 9 | Duck Dodgers in the 24½th Century | Daffy, Porky, Marvin | 1953 | Chuck Jones | MM |
| 10 | Hare-Way to the Stars | Bugs, Marvin | 1958 | Chuck Jones | LT |
| 11 | Mad as a Mars Hare (Note: Previously restored and released as part of Looney Tunes Super Stars' Bugs Bunny: Hare Extraordinaire albeit in cropped "widescreen" form. Presented in its correct 4:3 aspect ratio for this release.) | Bugs, Marvin | 1963 | Chuck Jones, Maurice Noble | MM |
| 12 | Devil May Hare | Bugs, Taz | 1954 | Robert McKimson | LT |
| 13 | Bedevilled Rabbit | Bugs, Taz | 1957 | Robert McKimson | MM |
| 14 | Ducking the Devil (Note: Previously restored and released as part of Looney Tunes Super Stars' Daffy Duck: Frustrated Fowl albeit in cropped "widescreen" form. Presented in its correct 4:3 aspect ratio for this release.) | Daffy, Taz | 1957 | Robert McKimson | MM |
| 15 | Bill of Hare | Bugs, Taz | 1962 | Robert McKimson | MM |
| 16 | Dr. Devil and Mr. Hare | Bugs, Taz | 1964 | Robert McKimson | MM |
| 17 | Bewitched Bunny | Bugs, Witch Hazel | 1954 | Chuck Jones | LT |
| 18 | Broom-Stick Bunny | Bugs, Witch Hazel | 1956 | Chuck Jones | LT |
| 19 | A Witch's Tangled Hare | Bugs, Witch Hazel | 1959 | Abe Levitow | LT |
| 20 | A-Haunting We Will Go | Daffy, Speedy, Witch Hazel | 1966 | Robert McKimson | LT |
| 21 | Feed the Kitty | Marc and Pussyfoot | 1952 | Chuck Jones | MM |
| 22 | Kiss Me Cat | Marc and Pussyfoot | 1953 | Chuck Jones | LT |
| 23 | Feline Frame-Up | Claude, Marc and Pussyfoot | 1954 | Chuck Jones | LT |
| 24 | From A to Z-Z-Z-Z | Ralph Phillips | 1954 | Chuck Jones | LT |
| 25 | Boyhood Daze (Note: Newly restored.) | Ralph Phillips | 1957 | Chuck Jones | MM |

=== Special features ===
==== Behind the Tunes ====
- It Hopped One Night: The Story Behind One Froggy Evening
- Wacky Warner One-Shots
- Mars Attacks! Life on the Red Planet with My Favorite Martian (provided in HD)
- Razzma-Taz: Giving the Tasmanian Devil His Due (provided in HD)
- The Ralph Phillips Story: Living the American Daydream (provided in HD)

==== Alternate Audio Tracks ====
- Audio commentaries
  - Michael Barrier, Corny Cole, Chuck Jones, Maurice Noble and Michael Maltese on One Froggy Evening
  - Jerry Beck and Stan Freberg on Three Little Bops
  - Eric Goldberg on I Love to Singa, Chow Hound, Bewitched Bunny, From A to Z-Z-Z-Z, Boyhood Daze
  - Michael Barrier, John McGrew, Paul Julian and Gene Fleury on The Dover Boys at Pimento University
  - Michael Barrier and Pete Alvarado on Haredevil Hare
  - Michael Barrier and Maurice Noble on Duck Dodgers in the 24½th Century
  - Jerry Beck on Devil May Hare
  - June Foray on Broom-Stick Bunny
  - Greg Ford on Feed the Kitty
  - Amid Amidi on From A to Z-Z-Z-Z
- Music-only tracks include: One Froggy Evening, Three Little Bops, Hare-Way to the Stars, Ducking the Devil, A Witch's Tangled Hare, Feed the Kitty and Boyhood Daze
- Music-and-effects tracks include: Bewitched Bunny, Broom-Stick Bunny and Feline Frame-Up
- Vocal-only tracks include: Three Little Bops

== Disc 3: Bonus Materials ==
- A Greeting from Chuck Jones
- Chuck Amuck: The Movie
- Chuck Jones: Extremes & Inbetweens – A Life in Animation
- Chuck Jones: Memories of Childhood
- The Animated World of Chuck Jones (9 Cartoons)
  - Point Rationing of Foods
  - Hell-Bent for Election
  - So Much for So Little
  - Orange Blossoms for Violet
  - A Hitch in Time
  - 90 Day Wondering
  - Drafty, Isn't It?
  - The Dot and the Line: A Romance in Lower Mathematics
  - The Bear That Wasn't
- How the Grinch Stole Christmas! Pencil Test
- The Door (provided in HD)
- Bonus Cartoons (9 Cartoons)
  - The Fright Before Christmas from Bugs Bunny's Looney Christmas Tales
  - Spaced Out Bunny from Bugs Bunny's Bustin' Out All Over
  - Duck Dodgers and the Return of the 24½th Century from Daffy Duck's Thanks-for-Giving (shortened version)
  - Another Froggy Evening
  - Marvin the Martian in the Third Dimension
  - Superior Duck (shortened version)
  - From Hare to Eternity
  - Father of the Bird
  - Museum Scream (provided in HD)

== Reception ==
A review at Slant concluded: "The ridiculous emphasis on Chuck Jones aside, this set gives the Region 1 world the gift of Looney Tunes in high definition. As Daffy might say, "It's all mine! I'm a happy miser!""

== Looney Tunes Showcase: Volume 1 ==
Looney Tunes Showcase: Volume 1 was released on January 10, 2012. It contains 25 Looney Tunes and Merrie Melodies shorts and numerous supplements. It is a separate release of Disc 1 of the Looney Tunes Platinum Collection: Volume 1.

== See also ==
- Looney Tunes Golden Collection
- Looney Tunes and Merrie Melodies filmography
  - Looney Tunes and Merrie Melodies filmography (1930–1939)
  - Looney Tunes and Merrie Melodies filmography (1940–1949)
  - Looney Tunes and Merrie Melodies filmography (1950–1959)
  - Looney Tunes and Merrie Melodies filmography (1960–1969)
  - Looney Tunes and Merrie Melodies filmography (1970–present)
