= List of Warner Bros. Cartoons productions =

This is a list of productions by Warner Bros. Cartoons, a subsidiary of Warner Bros. Pictures, which mainly produced the Looney Tunes and Merrie Melodies shorts. Other animated projects were made for Warner, as well as entities such as U.S. Army (Private Snafu) and U.S. Navy (Mr. Hook).

== Looney Tunes and Merrie Melodies ==
=== Theatrical shorts ===
Warner Bros. Cartoons produced two series of animated shorts for commercial theatrical release, Looney Tunes (1930–1969) and Merrie Melodies (1931–1969) All films before 1933 were co-produced with Harman-Ising Productions, the series' first production company and later Warner Bros.' competitors. The Looney Tunes and Merrie Melodies shorts featuring Bugs Bunny were also sold separately to distributors as Bugs Bunny Specials.

- Looney Tunes and Merrie Melodies filmography (1930–1939)
- Looney Tunes and Merrie Melodies filmography (1940–1949)
- Looney Tunes and Merrie Melodies filmography (1950–1959)
- Looney Tunes and Merrie Melodies filmography (1960–1969)

=== TV series ===
- The Bugs Bunny Show and various spin-offs (1960–1962)

== Miscellaneous shorts ==
The following is a list of various shorts outside of the Looney Tunes and Merrie Melodies series.

=== Spooney Melodies ===
Title	Director	Release date	DVD & Blu-ray availability	Notes
Crying for the Carolines	Neil McGuire	December 1930	LTGC Volume 1, Disc 3 (part of ToonHeads: The Lost Cartoons), LTGC Volume 6, Disc 3, LTPC Volume 2, Disc 3	A music video produced by Leon Schlesinger Productions, featuring Milton Charles singing the titular song. The only known surviving short in the "Spooney Melodies" series.
Just a Gigolo	Unknown	June 6, 1931	N/A	Lost films.
Say a Little Prayer for Me	Unknown	July 1931	N/A	Lost films.
When your Lover has Gone	Unknown	September 1931	N/A	Lost films.
For You	Unknown	December 1931	N/A	Lost films.

=== Other theatrical shorts ===
Title	Director	Release date	DVD & Blu-ray availability	Notes	Video if in the public domain
Orange Blossoms for Violet	Chuck Jones and Friz Freleng	May 24, 1952	LTGC Volume 2, Disc 4, LTPC Volume 1, Disc 3 (special feature)	Live-action film featuring footage of animals	
Philbert: Three's a Crowd	Richard Donner (live action); Friz Freleng (animation)	April 1, 1963	LTGC Volume 3, Disc 4	Unsold TV pilot, screened in theaters.	
Norman Normal	Alex Lovy	February 3, 1968	LTGC Volume 6, Disc 4	One-off short branded as a Cartoon Special.	
The Door	Ken Mundie	June 1, 1968	LTPC Volume 1, Disc 3 (special feature)	Produced by "Campbell-Silver-Cosby Corporation," a studio co-owned by Bill Cosby, who was then a popular recording artist with Warner Bros. Records. Cosby and Mundie would later team up to create Fat Albert and the Cosby Kids.	

=== Government films ===
==== One Shots ====
Title	Director	Characters	Release date	DVD & Blu-ray availability	Notes	Video if in the public domain
Point Rationing of Foods	Chuck Jones	Unknown	February 25, 1943	LTGC Volume 3, Disc 3, LTPC Volume 1, Disc 3 (special feature)	Documentary with limited animation Produced for Office of War Information of Bureau of Motion Pictures. It was distributed non-theatrically	
Dive Bombing Crashes		Unknown	1945	N/A	Only entry in the Flight Safety training film series produced by Warner Bros, all other films were produced by UPA; Produced for United States Navy.	
So Much for So Little	Chuck Jones	Unknown	January 1, 1949	LTGC Volume 2, Disc 4, Academy Awards Animation Collection: 15 Winners, Academy Awards Animation Collection, Disc 1, LTPC Volume 1, Disc 3 (special feature)	Theatrically screened Produced for Federal Security Agency Public Health Service	
90 Day Wondering	Chuck Jones	Ralph Phillips (as adult)	December 1956	LTGC Volume 4, Disc 3, LTPC Volume 1, Disc 3 (special feature)	Produced for United States Army.	
Drafty, Isn't It?	Chuck Jones	Ralph Phillips (as adult)	1957	LTGC Volume 4, Disc 3, LTPC Volume 1, Disc 3 (special feature)	Produced for United States Army.	

==== Private Snafu series ====
Note: All shorts in the main Private Snafu series were created by the U.S. War Department with animation by Warner Bros. Cartoons. Cartoons unless otherwise noted. The films, being produced for the U.S. government, are in the public domain. Private Snafu was also featured in the Few Quick Facts series but none of these shorts were produced by Warner Bros. or Harman-Ising thus they are not included here.

Title	Director	Release date	Note	DVD & Blu-ray availability	Video
Coming!! Snafu	Chuck Jones	June 28, 1943	Pilot for Private Snafu	LTGC Volume 5, Disc 3 Private Snafu Golden Classics	
Gripes	Friz Freleng	July 5, 1943		LTGC Volume 5, Disc 3 Private Snafu Golden Classics	
Spies	Chuck Jones	August 9, 1943	Was seen (with parts cut for content) on the Cartoon Network special ToonHeads: The Lost Cartoons.	LTGC Volume 3, Disc 4 Private Snafu Golden Classics	
The Goldbrick	Frank Tashlin	September 13, 1943		LTGC Volume 4, Disc 2 Private Snafu Golden Classics	
The Infantry Blues	Chuck Jones	September 20, 1943		Private Snafu Golden Classics	
Fighting Tools	Bob Clampett	October 18, 1943	Cameo of Daffy Duck as Father Duck. A briefly seen newspaper sub-headline reads "Adolph Hitler Commits Suicide"; this would not actually happen for another 18 months.	Private Snafu Golden Classics	
The Home Front	Frank Tashlin	November 15, 1943		LTGC Volume 4, Disc 2 Private Snafu Golden Classics	
Rumors	Friz Freleng	December 13, 1943		LTGC Volume 3, Disc 4 Private Snafu Golden Classics	
Booby Traps	Bob Clampett	January 10, 1944	First appearance of the 'Endearing Young Charms' musical bomb gag, which would be reused in two Bugs Bunny shorts, and two Wile E.Coyote/Road Runner shorts	Private Snafu Golden Classics	
Snafuperman	Friz Freleng	March 6, 1944		LTGC Volume 3, Disc 4 Private Snafu Golden Classics	
Private Snafu vs. Malaria Mike	Chuck Jones	March 27, 1944		Private Snafu Golden Classics	
A Lecture on Camouflage	Chuck Jones	April 24, 1944		Private Snafu Golden Classics	
Gas	Chuck Jones	May 29, 1944	Bugs Bunny makes a cameo appearance, having been pulled from Snafu's gas mask bag.	Private Snafu Golden Classics	
Going Home	Chuck Jones	Unreleased (planned for 1944); December 31, 2001 (Cartoon Network)	The often-quoted "Coming Home" is a non-existent title. It refers to "Going Home" - "Coming Home" was a result of an old typo.	Private Snafu Golden Classics	
The Chow Hound	Frank Tashlin	June 19, 1944		Private Snafu Golden Classics	
Censored	Frank Tashlin	July 17, 1944		LTGC Volume 4, Disc 2 Private Snafu Golden Classics	
Outpost	Chuck Jones	August 1, 1944		Private Snafu Golden Classics	
Payday	Friz Freleng	September 25, 1944		Private Snafu Golden Classics	
Target Snafu	Frank Tashlin	October 23, 1944		Private Snafu Golden Classics	
Three Brothers	Friz Freleng	December 4, 1944	Bugs Bunny makes a cameo appearance in the scene where Fubar tries to escape from the dogs.	Private Snafu Golden Classics	
In the Aleutians – Isles of Enchantment	Chuck Jones	February 12, 1945		Private Snafu Golden Classics	
It's Murder She Says	Chuck Jones	February 26, 1945		Private Snafu Golden Classics	
Hot Spot	Friz Freleng	July 2, 1945		Private Snafu Golden Classics	
No Buddy Atoll	Chuck Jones	October 8, 1945		Private Snafu Golden Classics	
Operation Snafu	Friz Freleng	December 22, 1945		Private Snafu Golden Classics	
Secrets of the Caribbean	Chuck Jones	Unreleased (planned for 1945)	Master given to the Army; Lost cartoon		
Private Snafu Presents Seaman Tarfu in the Navy	George Gordon	1946	Only Private Snafu entry not produced by Warner Bros; Produced by Harman and Ising.	Private Snafu Golden Classics	
A Hitch in Time	Chuck Jones	January 1, 1955	Produced in color; uses redesigned and renamed Snafu as "John McRogers" and Technical Fairy First Class as "Grogan, Technical Gremlin First Class"	LTPC Volume 1, Disc 3 (special feature)	

==== Mr. Hook series ====
Not listed below is Take Heed Mr. Tojo, released in August 1943. It was the first cartoon in the Hook series, but was produced at Walter Lantz Productions.

Title	Director	Characters	Release date	DVD & Blu-ray availability	Notes	Video
The Return of Mr. Hook	Chuck Jones	Mr. Hook	January 20, 1945	Looney Tunes Golden Collection: Volume 5	Made for the U.S. Navy in 1945. In the public domain and available at no charge on YouTube and the Internet Archive.	
Tokyo Woes	Robert McKimson	Mr. Hook	February 1945	Looney Tunes Golden Collection: Volume 5	Made for the U.S. Navy in 1945. In the public domain and available at no charge on YouTube and the Internet Archive.	
The Good Egg	Bob Clampett	Mr. Hook	1945	Looney Tunes Golden Collection: Volume 5	Made for the U.S. Navy in 1945. In the public domain and available at no charge on YouTube and the Internet Archive.	

== Miscellaneous films ==
The following films feature animation from Warner Bros. Cartoons, ranging from simple title sequences to more complex sequences.

Title	Year	Notes
Ride Him, Cowboy	August 23, 1932	Western starring John Wayne and produced by Leon Schlesinger Productions.
Haunted Gold	December 17, 1932	Western starring John Wayne and produced by Leon Schlesinger Productions. The animation department produced a sequence with animated bat in the titles at the beginning. The animated opening sequence is included on disc 3 of the Looney Tunes Golden Collection: Volume 6 DVD and disc 3 of the Looney Tunes Platinum Collection: Volume 2 Blu-ray as a special feature.
The Big Stampede	October 8, 1932	Western starring John Wayne and produced by Leon Schlesinger Productions.
The Telegraph Trail	March 18, 1933	Western starring John Wayne and produced by Leon Schlesinger Productions.
Somewhere in Sonora	May 27, 1933	Western starring John Wayne and produced by Leon Schlesinger Productions.
The Man from Monterey	July 15, 1933	Western starring John Wayne and produced by Leon Schlesinger Productions.
When's Your Birthday?	February 19, 1937	RKO Radio Pictures film, with animation sequences produced by Leon Schlesinger Productions, directed by Bob Clampett.
The Big Broadcast of 1938	February 11, 1938	Paramount Pictures film, with animation sequences produced by Leon Schlesinger Productions.
She Married a Cop	July 12, 1939	Republic Pictures film, with animation sequences produced by Leon Schlesinger Productions. Paddy the Pig, the animated character featured, resembles some of the earliest incarnations of Porky Pig.
Love Thy Neighbor	December 17, 1940	Paramount Pictures film, with animation sequences produced by Leon Schlesinger Productions.
The Lady Eve	February 25, 1941	Paramount Pictures film, with animation sequences produced by Leon Schlesinger Productions.
Hi Diddle Diddle	August 2, 1943	United Artists film, with animation sequences produced by Leon Schlesinger Productions.
Two Guys from Texas	August 27, 1948	Warner Bros. Pictures film, with a cameo appearance of Bugs Bunny. The animated sequence is included on Looney Tunes Golden Collection, vol. 1 as a special feature.
My Dream Is Yours	April 15, 1949	Warner Bros. Pictures film, with cameo appearances of Bugs Bunny and Tweety. The cameo scenes are included on Looney Tunes Golden Collection, vol. 1 and The Essential Bugs Bunny as a special feature.
The Incredible Mr. Limpet	March 28, 1964	Warner Bros. Pictures film, with animation sequences produced under the supervision of Robert McKimson, and it was the final project for the studio prior to its temporary closure in December 1963.

== See also ==
- Warner Bros. Animation
- Warner Bros. Cartoons
- Warner Bros. Pictures Animation
- Looney Tunes and Merrie Melodies filmography
- List of Warner Bros. theatrical animated features
- List of unproduced Warner Bros. Animation projects
- List of Warner Bros. Animation productions
