= Chuck Jones: Extremes & Inbetweens – A Life in Animation =

2000 American TV documentary film

- DVD cover
- Genre: Documentary film
- Written by: Margaret Selby; Greg Ford
- Directed by: Margaret Selby
- Starring: Charles M. Jones
- Country of origin: United States
- Original language: English

Production
- Producers: Margaret Selby; Greg Ford
- Running time: 85 mins.

Original release
- Network: PBS
- Release: November 22, 2000

Chuck Jones: Extremes & Inbetweens – A Life in Animation is a 2000 American television documentary film directed by Margaret Selby. The film chronicles the career of legendary Looney Tunes and Merrie Melodies director, Chuck Jones. The film features interviews with Jones himself, as well as animators Matt Groening, Eric Goldberg, and John Lasseter, critics Roger Ebert and Leonard Maltin, film directors Steven Spielberg, Ron Howard, and Joe Dante, and comedians Whoopi Goldberg, Lorne Michaels, Robin Williams, and June Foray, as well as others. The film was originally broadcast as part of the Great Performances series on November 22, 2000, on PBS, and later released to VHS and DVD by Warner Home Video on October 22, 2002.

== Premise ==
The film chronicles the career of legendary Looney Tunes and Merrie Melodies director, Chuck Jones; from his start in the animation industry as a cel washer; to director of shorts starring Bugs Bunny, Daffy Duck, Porky Pig, Elmer Fudd, Pepé Le Pew, Michigan J. Frog, Marvin the Martian, Wile E. Coyote and the Road Runner, Hubie and Bertie, and the Three Bears, among others; the animation process consisting of: storyboards, backgrounds, dialogue, expressions, comedic timing, sound effects, and music; discussions on select Jones films such as The Dover Boys, Duck Amuck, Duck Dodgers in the 24½th Century, The Scarlet Pumpernickel, Dripalong Daffy, Hopalong Casualty, Robin Hood Daffy, Bear Feat, Mouse Wreckers, Rabbit Seasoning, Broomstick Bunny, Feed the Kitty, Long-Haired Hare, High Note, Rabbit of Seville, What's Opera, Doc?, The Dot and the Line, How the Grinch Stole Christmas, and One Froggy Evening, among others; and to his role as an "elder statesman" of animation.

== Interviews ==
- Chuck Jones
- Marian Jones
- Linda Jones-Clough
- Todd Kausen
- Craig Kausen
- Valerie Kausen
- Ken Burns
- Joe Dante
- Roger Ebert
- Stan Freberg
- Robert Givens
- Eric Goldberg
- Whoopi Goldberg
- Matt Groening
- Ron Howard
- Richard Kent Jones
- Norton Juster
- Glen Keane
- John Lasseter
- Leonard Maltin
- Roger Mayer
- Lorne Michaels
- Rob Minkoff
- Maurice Noble
- Andre Previn
- Martha Sigall
- Steven Spielberg
- Robin Williams
