= Chuck Amuck: The Movie =

1991 film

- Directed by: Chuck Jones; Abe Levitow
- Written by: John W. Dunn
- Produced by: John Needham
- Narrated by: Dick Vosburgh
- Release date: October 23, 1991
- Running time: 51 minutes
- Country: United States

Chuck Amuck: The Movie is a 1991 documentary film about Chuck Jones's career with Warner Bros. Cartoons, centered on his work with Looney Tunes; narrated by Dick Vosburgh. Jones received an Honorary Life Membership from the Directors Guild of America, and a 1996 Honorary Oscar for Lifetime Achievement. And in 1992, What's Opera, Doc? was added to the USA's National Film Registry of most significant films of all time.

== Synopsis ==
The movie comprises an inside look and complete telling of Chuck Jones' career as one of America's most notable animators, in which he created the memorable cartoon characters Bugs Bunny, Daffy Duck, Elmer Fudd, Porky Pig, Yosemite Sam, Marvin the Martian, Tweety, Sylvester the Cat, Road Runner, Pepé le Pew and other Looney Tunes and Merrie Melodies characters. There are many classic clips of his work and interviews of colleagues who worked with Jones.

== Cast ==
- Chuck Jones
- Maurice Noble
- Lloyd Vaughan
- Retta Davidson
- Dick Vosburgh
- Mel Blanc
- Ray Katz
- Michael Maltese
- Leon Schlesinger

== Home video ==
The film was released on VHS. It also appears as a special feature on Looney Tunes Golden Collection: Volume 3 and Looney Tunes Platinum Collection: Volume 1.
