= Boyhood Daze =

1957 Warner Bros. Merrie Melodies cartoon

- Title card
- Directed by: Chuck Jones
- Story by: Michael Maltese
- Starring: Dick Beals; Daws Butler; Marian Richman
- Edited by: Treg Brown
- Music by: Milt Franklyn
- Animation by: Abe Levitow; Richard Thompson; Ken Harris; Harry Love
- Layouts by: Maurice Noble
- Backgrounds by: Philip DeGuard
- Production company: Warner Bros. Cartoons
- Distributed by: Warner Bros. Pictures
- Release date: April 20, 1957
- Running time: 7 minutes
- Country: United States
- Language: English

Boyhood Daze is a 1957 Warner Bros. Merrie Melodies cartoon directed by Chuck Jones. The script was written by Michael Maltese, and the film score was composed by Milt Franklyn. The voices were provided by Dick Beals, Daws Butler and Marian Richman. It contains the science fiction element of an alien invasion.

The short was released on April 20, 1957, and features young boy Ralph Phillips. Following From A to Z-Z-Z-Z (1954), it is one of two cartoons in which he stars. The title of this short is a play on the phrase "boyhood days".

== Plot ==
The cartoon starts with an exterior shot of a house window before a baseball is sent through it from inside the home, breaking it in the process. The cause is naturally revealed to be Ralph, with someone (Ralph, his mother or both) exclaiming, "Ohhh nooo!", and Ralph's mother subsequently sending him up to his bedroom until his father gets home.

Up in his room, he broods over his mistake and tries to imagine himself as a hero, by imagining himself as a famous explorer in Africa to rescue his parents from a native tribe, then tells his father to go to his room for playing in Africa and tells his mother his insurance will cover the window and to buy a catcher's mitt with the rest as he dies from his wounds.

He is then seen making paper airplanes, and wishing he was a "jet ace or something." He then is imagining himself as an Air Force pilot who thwarts a Martian invasion and is a national hero.

His third dream occurs after he hears his dad come home and the distant talking of both of his parents. He imagines himself as a convict in a jail cell. A whispering voice repeats: "They're coming to get'cha, Phillips. They're coming to get'cha." He steps down, crushes out a cigarette he was smoking, and strides to the cell door, which opens to reveal a silhouetted person with a booming voice saying: "You're going to have to pay for this, Ralph Phillips!"

Back in reality, it turns out to be his rather gentle-demeaning father who informs Ralph that the window repair is coming out of his allowance, then lets him go outside to play.

As he runs back outside with a baseball bat and glove, he stops when he sees a cherry tree in the yard, then notices a hatchet. In the next scene he is walking towards the tree with the hatchet, in the process turning into a young George Washington, as the cartoon irises out.

== Reception ==
Motion Picture Exhibitor reviewed the short on August 21, 1957: "This shows the vivid creation of Ralph, a little boy sent to bed for being naughty... The ultra-modern drawings are excellent, but this is not very funny."

== Home media ==
- VHS - Looney Tunes Collectors Edition Volume 2: Running Amuck
- Laserdisc - Looney Tunes: Assorted Nuts
- DVD - Looney Tunes Golden Collection: Volume 6 (bonus feature)
- Blu-ray - Looney Tunes Platinum Collection: Volume 1

== See also ==
- Looney Tunes and Merrie Melodies filmography (1950–1959)
