= Baby Bottleneck =

1946 Daffy Duck and Porky Pig cartoon

- Original title card
- Directed by: Robert Clampett
- Story by: Warren Foster
- Music by: Carl W. Stalling
- Animation by: Rod Scribner; Manny Gould; C. Melendez; I. Ellis
- Layouts by: Thomas McKimson
- Backgrounds by: Dorcy Howard
- Color process: Technicolor
- Production company: Warner Bros. Cartoons
- Distributed by: Warner Bros. Pictures; The Vitaphone Corporation
- Release date: March 16, 1946
- Running time: 7:03
- Language: English

Baby Bottleneck is a 1946 Warner Bros. Looney Tunes cartoon directed by Bob Clampett and written by Warren Foster. The cartoon was released on March 16, 1946, and stars Daffy Duck and Porky Pig. Tweety makes a cameo appearance in the film.

== Plot ==
As the baby boom of 1946 escalates, a disgruntled stork (patterned after its Jimmy Durante figure) laments his workload at the Stork's Club. Inexperienced animals have attempted, unsuccessfully, to mitigate the increased workload, resulting in numerous baby animals being delivered to parents of the wrong species.

Porky Pig takes charge of Storks Inc. and appoints Daffy Duck to answer the phones. An assembly line powders, diapers, feeds and burps each baby before it is sent to its parents. Trouble arises when Porky discovers an egg without an address; Porky decides that hatching it will reveal its species and assigns Daffy to the task. Daffy refuses, leading to a chase around the factory and an eventual mishap where both go through the assembly line together and are sent to Africa, where a mother gorilla awaits her child.

Daffy cries upon realizing where he is due to his own actions, and the gorilla begins nursing him until Porky emerges from the diaper. The gorilla, terrified, calls Mr. Anthony (a popular radio advice commentator of the era).

== Voice Cast ==
- Mel Blanc as Daffy Duck / Porky Pig / Narrator / Drunken Stork (impression of Jimmy Durante) / Scotty Dog / Inventor Dog / Baby Hippo / Animal and Baby vocal effects
- Sara Berner as Mother Gorilla / Mrs. Pig (deleted scene)

== Reception ==
Michael Barrier writes, "Baby Bottleneck, like Book Revue (1946), reveals just how great Bob Clampett's impact was on the Warner Bros. cartoons in the early 1940s... As so often in Clampett's best cartoons, there is a prevailing air of hysteria and madness: The stork is drunk, inexperienced help is delivering babies to the wrong mothers, everything is a mess — and all is bliss."

== Home media ==
- VHS 1986 - Viddy-Oh! For Kids Cartoon Festivals: Porky Pig and Daffy Duck Cartoon Festival Featuring "Tick Tock Tuckered" (Blue Ribbion) - MGM/UA Home Video
- VHS 1988 - Cartoon Moviestars: Porky! (Blue Ribbion) - MGM/UA Home Video
- Laserdisc 1988 - Cartoon Moviestars: Daffy! and Porky! - MGM/UA Home Video
- Laserdisc 1991 - The Golden Age of Looney Tunes: Volume 1 (Blue Ribbion) - MGM/UA Home Video
- VHS 1992 - The Golden Age of Looney Tunes: Vol. 8 - 1940s Zanies (Blue Ribbion) - MGM/UA Home Video
- DVD 2004 - Looney Tunes Golden Collection: Volume 2 (restored with original titles) - Warner Home Video
- DVD 2004 - Looney Tunes Spotlight Collection: Volume 2 (restored with original titles) - Warner Home Video
- Blu-Ray & DVD 2011 - Looney Tunes Platinum Collection: Volume 1 (restored with original titles) - Warner Home Video
- Blu-Ray 2012 - Looney Tunes Showcase: Volume One (restored with original titles) - Warner Home Video
- DVD 2013 - Best of Warner Bros: 50 Cartoon Collection - Looney Tunes (restored) - Warner Home Video

== See also ==
- Daffy Duck filmography
- Porky Pig filmography
- Looney Tunes and Merrie Melodies filmography (1940–1949)
