= Looney Tunes Golden Collection: Volume 2 =

2004 American DVD box set

- DVD cover
- Directed by: Friz Freleng; Chuck Jones; Bob Clampett; Tex Avery; Robert McKimson; Cal Dalton; Cal Howard; Frank Tashlin; Arthur Davis
- Produced by: Leon Schlesinger; Eddie Selzer; John W. Burton
- Starring: voice of Mel Blanc
- Distributed by: Warner Home Video
- Release date: November 2, 2004
- Running time: 432 minutes
- Country: United States
- Language: English

Looney Tunes Golden Collection: Volume 2 is a DVD box set that was released by Warner Home Video on November 2, 2004. The second release of the Looney Tunes Golden Collection DVD series, it contains 60 Looney Tunes and Merrie Melodies cartoons and numerous supplements.

== Related releases ==
As with Volume 1, the individual discs were released separately in Regions 2 & 4:

- Disc 1: Best of Bugs Bunny - Volume 2
- Disc 2: Best of Road Runner
- Disc 3: Best of Tweety and Sylvester
- Disc 4: All-Stars - Volume 3

In Region 1, discs 3 and 4 were also released separately as the more family-friendly Looney Tunes Spotlight Collection: Volume 2.

== Disc 1: Bugs Bunny Masterpieces ==
All cartoons on this disc star Bugs Bunny.

#	Title	Co-stars	Year	Director	Series
1	The Big Snooze	Elmer	1946	Bob Clampett	LT
2	Broom-Stick Bunny	Witch Hazel	1956	Chuck Jones	LT
3	Bugs Bunny Rides Again	Yosemite Sam	1948	Friz Freleng	MM
4	Bunny Hugged	The Crusher	1951	Chuck Jones	MM
5	French Rarebit		1951	Robert McKimson	MM
6	Gorilla My Dreams	Gruesome Gorilla	1948	Robert McKimson	LT
7	The Hare-Brained Hypnotist	Elmer	1942	Friz Freleng	MM
8	Hare Conditioned		1945	Chuck Jones	LT
9	The Heckling Hare	Willoughby	1941	Tex Avery	MM
10	Little Red Riding Rabbit		1944	Friz Freleng	MM
11	Tortoise Beats Hare	Cecil	1941	Tex Avery	MM
12	Rabbit Transit	Cecil	1947	Friz Freleng	LT
13	Slick Hare	Elmer	1947	Friz Freleng	MM
14	Baby Buggy Bunny		1954	Chuck Jones	MM
15	Hyde and Hare		1955	Friz Freleng	LT

=== Special features ===
==== Audio bonuses ====
- Music-only audio tracks on Hyde and Hare
- Music-and-effects-only audio track on Broom-Stick Bunny, Bunny Hugged, Baby Buggy Bunny
- Audio commentaries
  - Bill Melendez on The Big Snooze
  - June Foray on Broom-Stick Bunny
  - Greg Ford on Bugs Bunny Rides Again, The Heckling Hare
  - Jerry Beck on Gorilla My Dreams
  - Michael Barrier on Tortoise Beats Hare, Slick Hare
  - Chuck Jones on Tortoise Beats Hare

==== From the Vaults ====
- Bugs Bunny/Looney Tunes All-Star 50th Anniversary Special: Part 1 (1986)
- The Bugs Bunny Show: Do or Diet bridging sequences; No Business Like Slow Business audio recording sessions with Mel Blanc

==== Behind-the-Tunes ====
- A Conversation With Tex Avery: A look on Avery explaining his various tricks of his particular brand of cartoon trade, from where the “What’s Up Doc?” expression came from, to his days at MGM.

== Disc 2: Road Runner and Friends ==
All cartoons on this disc are directed by Chuck Jones.

#	Title	Characters	Year	Series
1	Beep, Beep	Wile E. Coyote and the Road Runner	1952	MM
2	Going! Going! Gosh!	Wile E. Coyote and the Road Runner	1952	MM
3	Zipping Along	Wile E. Coyote and the Road Runner	1953	MM
4	Stop! Look! And Hasten!	Wile E. Coyote and the Road Runner	1954	MM
5	Ready, Set, Zoom!	Wile E. Coyote and the Road Runner	1955	LT
6	Guided Muscle	Wile E. Coyote and the Road Runner	1955	LT
7	Gee Whiz-z-z-z-z-z-z	Wile E. Coyote and the Road Runner	1956	LT
8	There They Go-Go-Go!	Wile E. Coyote and the Road Runner	1956	LT
9	Scrambled Aches	Wile E. Coyote and the Road Runner	1957	LT
10	Zoom and Bored	Wile E. Coyote and the Road Runner	1957	MM
11	Whoa, Be-Gone!	Wile E. Coyote and the Road Runner	1958	MM
12	Cheese Chasers	Claude, Hubie and Bertie, Marc Antony	1951	MM
13	The Dover Boys at Pimento University		1942	MM
14	Mouse Wreckers	Claude, Hubie and Bertie	1949	LT
15	A Bear for Punishment	The Three Bears	1951	LT

=== Special features ===
==== Audio bonuses ====
- Music-only audio tracks on Guided Muscle, Gee Whiz-z-z-z-z-z-z, There They Go-Go-Go!, Scrambled Aches, Zoom and Bored
- Music-and-effects-only audio track on A Bear for Punishment
- Audio commentaries
  - Michael Barrier on Beep, Beep, The Dover Boys at Pimento University, A Bear for Punishment
  - Greg Ford on Stop! Look! And Hasten!, Whoa, Be-Gone!, Mouse Wreckers

==== From the Vaults ====
- Adventures of the Road-Runner 1962 television pilot
- The Bugs Bunny/Road Runner Show 1968 opening title sequence

==== Behind-the-Tunes ====
- Crash! Bang! Boom!: The Wild Sounds of Treg Brown: A look at Termite Terrace's sound effects man, Treg Brown, and how he created the iconic sound effects heard in many Looney Tunes and Merrie Melodies cartoons.

== Disc 3: Tweety and Sylvester and Friends ==
#	Title	Characters	Year	Director	Series
1	Bad Ol' Putty Tat	Tweety, Sylvester	1949	Friz Freleng	MM
2	All a Bir-r-r-d	Tweety, Sylvester, Hector	1950	Friz Freleng	LT
3	Room and Bird	Tweety, Sylvester, Granny, Hector	1951	Friz Freleng	MM
4	Tweet Tweet Tweety	Tweety, Sylvester	1951	Friz Freleng	LT
5	Gift Wrapped	Tweety, Sylvester, Granny, Hector	1952	Friz Freleng	LT
6	Ain't She Tweet	Tweety, Sylvester, Granny, Hector	1952	Friz Freleng	LT
7	A Bird in a Guilty Cage	Tweety, Sylvester	1952	Friz Freleng	LT
8	Snow Business	Tweety, Sylvester, Granny	1953	Friz Freleng	LT
9	Tweetie Pie	Tweety, Sylvester	1947	Friz Freleng	MM
10	Kitty Kornered	Porky, Sylvester	1946	Bob Clampett	LT
11	Baby Bottleneck	Daffy, Porky	1946	Bob Clampett	LT
12	Old Glory	Porky	1939	Chuck Jones	MM
13	The Great Piggy Bank Robbery	Daffy	1946	Bob Clampett	LT
14	Duck Soup to Nuts	Daffy, Porky	1944	Friz Freleng	LT
15	Porky in Wackyland	Porky	1938	Bob Clampett	LT

=== Special features ===
==== Audio Track ====
Music-and-Effects Only Audio Tracks for Tweet Tweet Tweety and A Bird in a Guilty Cage

==== Audio commentaries ====
- Greg Ford on Ain't She Tweet, Tweetie Pie
- Michael Barrier on Kitty Kornered, Baby Bottleneck, Porky in Wackyland
- Jerry Beck and Martha Sigall on Old Glory
- John Kricfalusi on The Great Piggy Bank Robbery

==== From the Vaults ====
- Bonus cartoon: Daffy Duck for President (An all-new Daffy Duck cartoon released to tie in with the 2004 Election)
- The Bugs Bunny/Looney Tunes 50th Anniversary Special: Part 2
- The Porky Pig Show opening title sequence
- The Bugs Bunny & Tweety Show 1988 and 1992 opening title sequences

==== Behind-the-Tunes ====
- The Man From Wackyland: The Art of Bob Clampett

== Disc 4: Looney Tunes All-Stars: On Stage and Screen ==
#	Title	Characters	Year	Director	Series
1	Back Alley Oproar	Sylvester, Elmer	1948	Friz Freleng	MM
2	Book Revue	Daffy	1946	Bob Clampett	LT
3	A Corny Concerto	Bugs, Daffy, Elmer, Porky	1943	Bob Clampett	MM
4	Have You Got Any Castles		1938	Frank Tashlin	MM
5	Hollywood Steps Out		1941	Tex Avery	MM
6	I Love to Singa		1936	Tex Avery	MM
7	Katnip Kollege		1938	Cal Howard and Cal Dalton	MM
8	The Hep Cat	Willoughby	1942	Bob Clampett	LT
9	Three Little Bops		1957	Friz Freleng	LT
10	One Froggy Evening	Michigan J. Frog	1955	Chuck Jones	MM
11	Rhapsody Rabbit	Bugs	1946	Friz Freleng	MM
12	Show Biz Bugs	Bugs, Daffy	1957	Friz Freleng	LT
13	Stage Door Cartoon	Bugs, Elmer	1944	Friz Freleng	MM
14	What's Opera, Doc?	Bugs, Elmer	1957	Chuck Jones	MM
15	You Ought to Be in Pictures	Daffy, Porky	1940	Friz Freleng	LT

=== Special features ===
==== Audio bonuses ====
- Music-only audio tracks on Three Little Bops, One Froggy Evening, and What's Opera, Doc?
- Vocals-only audio tracks on Three Little Bops and What's Opera, Doc?
- Audio commentaries
  - Greg Ford on Back Alley Oproar, Hollywood Steps Out, and Show Biz Bugs
  - Michael Barrier on Book Revue, A Corny Concerto, and One Froggy Evening
  - Jerry Beck and Stan Freberg on Three Little Bops
  - Daniel Goldmark on Rhapsody Rabbit and What's Opera, Doc?
  - Chuck Jones, Michael Maltese, and Maurice Noble on What's Opera, Doc?
  - Jerry Beck on You Ought to Be in Pictures

==== Behind-the-Tunes ====
- Looney Tunes Go Hollywood: Termite Terrace unit’s passion for sending up the Hollywood of the time and explains the stories behind many of the toons’ delicious parodies, how they expanded into even the musical scores for those pictures, and the tradition of spoofing celebrities that lives on in the movie references in cartoon shows today.
- It Hopped One Night: A Look at One Froggy Evening: A look on the in-depth on what went into making the Chuck Jones masterpiece and its influential effect
- Wagnerian Wabbit: The Making of What's Opera, Doc?

==== From the Vaults ====
- Orange Blossoms for Violet (1952) - short live action movie with dubbed-animals only.
- Academy Award-winning So Much for So Little (1949).

== Release and reception ==
Warner Home Video was not sure that Looney Tunes Golden Collection: Volume 1 would sell well enough to justify a second release in the series. Prior to the release of the second volume, WHV's Vice President of Non-Theatrical Franchise Marketing announced: "We are extremely pleased with consumer response to last year's Volume One editions and we are delighted to release another installment of our most famous animated classics."

The first set in the Looney Tunes Golden Collection series had won the Classic Award at the Parents' Choice Awards, and the second release was also an award-winner. TVShowsOnDVD.com reported that the set won the award for "Best Animated Series" release at the 3rd Annual TV-DVD Conference. In The New York Sun, author and critic Gary Giddins complained that this set, like the first one, was skimpy with the black-and-white shorts, and seemed to avoid the more politically incorrect cartoons in the series. When his review was reprinted in the book, Natural Selection, Giddins noted that Looney Tunes Golden Collection: Volume 3 made up for the latter shortcoming by including some of the racist caricature in the series, preceded by an explanatory introduction by Whoopi Goldberg.

In a review reprinted in Syracuse, New York's The Post-Standard, Randy Salas, a critic for the Minneapolis, St. Paul Star Tribune, called the second volume in the Looney Tunes Golden Collection series a "glorious release". Salas describes the main content of the set, highlighting contributions from Chuck Jones and Friz Freleng with particular emphasis on Jones' One Froggy Evening (1955). The extras highlighted in the review include commentary from music historian Daniel Goldmark, and interviews with Chuck Jones, who had died in 2002. The review summed up, "This is an essential set for any animation fan, and it might just convert many who are not." The reviewer concluded by pointing out that a 2-disc "Spotlight Collection" with selections from the 4-disc set was also available, but advised, "Skip it and go for the full course."

== See also ==
- Looney Tunes and Merrie Melodies filmography
  - Looney Tunes and Merrie Melodies filmography (1929–1939)
  - Looney Tunes and Merrie Melodies filmography (1940–1949)
  - Looney Tunes and Merrie Melodies filmography (1950–1959)
  - Looney Tunes and Merrie Melodies filmography (1960–1969)
  - Looney Tunes and Merrie Melodies filmography (1970–present)
