= Chow Hound =

1951 film by Chuck Jones

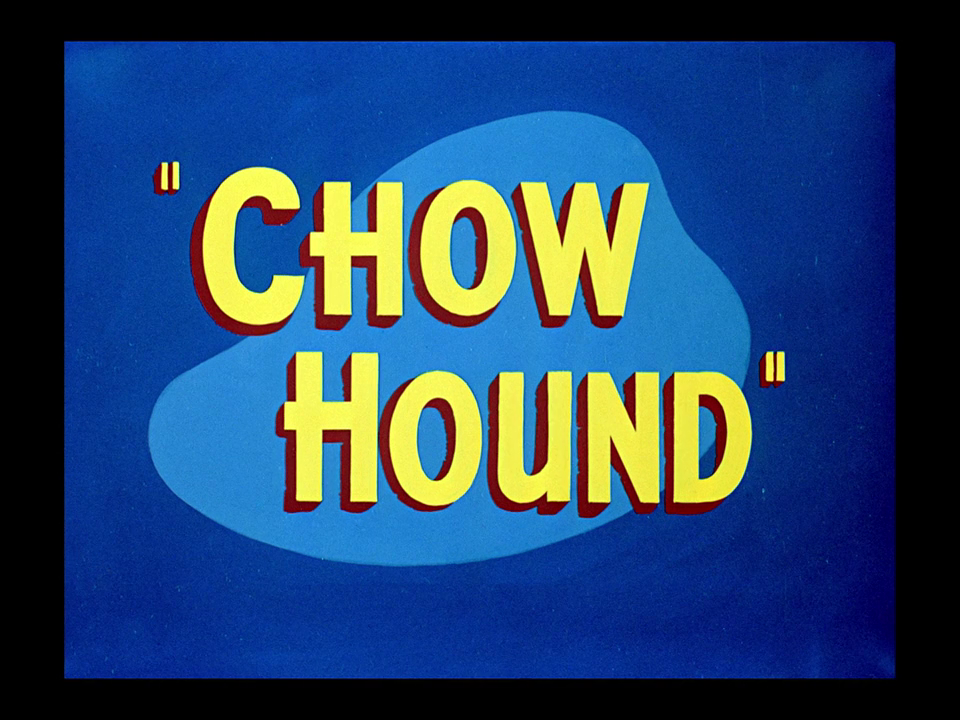
- Title card
- Directed by: Charles M. Jones
- Story by: Michael Maltese
- Starring: Mel Blanc; Bea Benaderet (uncredited); John T. Smith (uncredited)
- Music by: Carl Stalling
- Animation by: Ken Harris; Phil Monroe; Lloyd Vaughan; Ben Washam
- Layouts by: Robert Gribbroek
- Backgrounds by: Phillip DeGuard
- Color process: Technicolor
- Production company: Warner Bros. Cartoons
- Distributed by: Warner Bros. Pictures
- Release date: June 16, 1951
- Running time: 6:36
- Language: English

Chow Hound is a 1951 Warner Bros. Looney Tunes animated short directed by Chuck Jones and written by Michael Maltese. The short was released on June 16, 1951. The voices are performed by Mel Blanc, Bea Benaderet and John T. Smith.

Unlike many Warner Bros. cartoons featuring cats, such as Sylvester, as the antagonists of their targets (such as birds like Tweety, and mice) with dogs serving to discourage their behavior, Chow Hound uses a different formula, applying the inverse of these roles.

== Plot ==
A large bulldog bullies two unwilling parties—a frightened cat, whom the dog refers to as "Stupid" three times in the short, and a tough-talking mouse—into various scams to obtain dinner from various residences. The bulldog himself repeatedly punishes the cat for (so the dog believes) consistently coming back with stolen meat but no gravy. The scheme involves the dog, who forever complains that he is "starving", using the cat to pose as the pet for three residents and an exhibit at a municipal zoo. The cat poses as (in order of appearance):

- "Butch", a turtleneck-wearing feline. The cat timidly walks to the waiting bulldog to hand him his steak, but the bulldog asks "What, no gravy?" and slaps the cat for forgetting the gravy.
- A bow-tied "Harold", who is scolded by his female "mistress" as he comes home. "Harold" tries to eat a leg of chicken when the mistress leaves the room, but is quickly grabbed by the bulldog, who again reprimands him for forgetting the gravy.
- "Timothy", the alley cat who serves as the mouse catcher for an older gentleman living in a brownstone apartment building. The cat swallows the mouse whole, earning more physical punishment; the mouse tries unsuccessfully to get away after he is spit out. After earning another steak from the owner, the cat is again slapped by the bulldog for forgetting the gravy again. The mouse tries to get tough, but is simply hit on the head.
- A "saber-tooth alley catus", complete with fake fangs. The zookeeper shrugs his shoulders at the apparently new, unannounced "exhibit". It is at this point where the cat tries to one-up his captor by wrapping a TNT stick inside the steak. The result is only a small blast in the dog's stomach, which the embarrassed dog apparently misinterprets as gas and excuses himself. He smacks the cat (off-screen) for forgetting the gravy yet again.

The dog then starts to complain that "week in, week out, it's the same thing; it's too slow!" He then sees a sign advertising a reward for lost animals and gets a sinister idea: holding the cat hostage, the dog accurately anticipates that the cat's "owners" will post rewards in the newspaper. "I've got plans for you!" the dog snarls at the cat.

The bulldog reads the missing animals article in the newspaper for the addresses of the owners as he prepares to execute his big scam (telling his cat comrade "C'mon stupid; this is the payoff!"). The bulldog returns the cat to each of his masters, collects the reward and then reclaims his cat by means of a trick-bed, and presents the "saber-tooth alley catus" as a hunting prize to the zoo (this part was cut off in the 1990s on various TV channels in USA because it showed the mouse with makeup resembling blackface to disguise him as a native African savage). The dog, gloating that he is now "set for life" and will "never be hungry again," uses his ill-gotten gains to purchase a butcher shop, where "acres and acres" of meat hang from the ceiling.

The final scene takes place at a "dog and cat hospital". The bulldog's greed and gluttony has gotten the better of him, as his overindulgence on meat has rendered him grossly obese and unable to move a muscle. After two doctors diagnose "a distinct case of overeating" and depart from the operating room, two visitors march in: the cat and the mouse. The cat—speaking for the first and only time in the film—menacingly says, "This time, we didn't forget the gravy." The nervously perspiring dog repeatedly mutters "no" but is helpless to stop them as the mouse jams a large funnel into the dog's mouth and smiles as the cat begins force-feeding the dog a dangerously unhealthy amount of gravy from an institutional-sized canister as the picture irises out over the sound of the dog gurgling, with the cat and mouse finally getting their revenge against their canine tormentor.

== Reception ==
Animator Eric Goldberg writes, "This is one of my all-time favorite Chuck Jones cartoons for a variety of reasons, not the least of which is that it may be the darkest film he ever made... Talk about a morality play! I don't think I've ever seen comic retribution played out with such devilish, and deserved, relish. A masterpiece."

== Home media ==
Chow Hound is available (uncensored and uncut) on DVD as part of the Looney Tunes Golden Collection: Volume 6, disc 4, and on Blu-ray (presented in 1080p high definition) as part of the Looney Tunes Platinum Collection: Volume 1, disc 2.
