= From A to Z-Z-Z-Z =

- Title card
- Directed by: Charles M. Jones
- Story by: Michael Maltese
- Starring: Dick Beals; Mel Blanc; Marian Richman; Norman Nesbitt
- Music by: Carl Stalling
- Animation by: Ken Harris; Lloyd Vaughan; Ben Washam
- Layouts by: Maurice Noble
- Backgrounds by: Philip DeGuard
- Color process: Technicolor
- Production company: Warner Bros. Cartoons
- Distributed by: Warner Bros. Pictures
- Release date: October 6, 1954
- Running time: 7 minutes
- Country: United States
- Language: English

From A to Z-Z-Z-Z is a 1954 Warner Bros. Looney Tunes animated cartoon short directed by Chuck Jones. The short was released on October 16, 1954, and stars Ralph Phillips.

Written by Michael Maltese, it was animated by Ken Harris, Lloyd Vaughan and Ben Washam. Voices were provided by Dick Beals, Mel Blanc, Marian Richman and Norman Nesbitt.

The short was nominated for "Best Short Subject, Cartoons" at the 1954 Academy Awards.

Ralph appears in a sequel cartoon, Boyhood Daze, released in 1957.

He also appears in the Looney Tunes Cartoons season 5 short, "Livin' the Daydream".

== Plot ==
The cartoon begins with an exterior shot of an elementary school classroom. Through the windows, schoolchildren are visible at their desks. They are learning arithmetic by rote. The main character, Ralph Phillips, is bored with this lesson; on seeing a bird outside, he imagines that he is free to use his arms and legs to propel himself through the air.

Miss Wallace interrupts this daydream and sends Ralph to the blackboard to add a column of numbers. He is so intimidated by the problem, he fantasizes that the numbers come to life and laugh at him. He appears as a chalk drawing on the blackboard, sneaks toward the numbers and removes the line above where the sum should be; the numbers (having no support) collapse. A 5 suddenly stands up, using a 4 as a sword and Ralph fights it using the line as a weapon. Ralph sticks the line into the 5, defeating it. The other numbers get up and give chase. Ralph takes the capital D and Y from the alphabet row above and uses them to make a bow and arrow; he fires at an 8, destroying it. He then takes the dots from both the lowercase i and j and loads them into the i, using the i as a weapon similar to a shotgun: he fires at a 3, destroying it.

The scene segues back into the classroom as Miss Wallace brings Ralph back to reality and sends him out to mail a letter. He responds by becoming a Pony Express courier who braves a horde of Indians on what becomes his desert journey, ending up so shot full of arrows from his return trip that, while returning to normal, he limps back into the classroom, assures Miss Wallace of the task’s completion, and falls to the ground “dead”.

Back in the classroom, he finds the geography lesson tedious until the sight of a fish in an aquarium triggers his next daydream — as a deep-sea diver, with no gear except a knife, who dives to a depth of "seven hundred farthings" to kill a shark which is guarding an immobilized submarine, and then lifts the submarine and allowing it to float freely to safety (on board is Miss Wallace dressed as a nurse; she holds up a sign reading, "Oh, thank you, thank you, Ralph!"). As Ralph is acknowledging this, an octopus tentacle grabs him around his throat; this turns out to be Miss Wallace escorting him by his shirt collar into the corner, for not paying attention during class.

This, however, does not stop him from turning the classroom into a boxing ring where he knocks out the champ. As he is celebrating this, the scene segues back into the classroom, where the boxing ring bell turns out to be the classroom bell. The children have all left for the day and Miss Wallace tells Ralph he may go too. As he is walking from the room, Ralph imagines himself as a striding Douglas MacArthur and repeats the general's most famous line: "I shall return."

== Reception ==
Darrell Van Citters writes, "Of all the Warner Bros. directors, Chuck Jones seems to have relied least on conventional formulas for his story material. Part of this was probably due to his personal preferences and part of it was due to his ace story man, Mike Maltese... Credit goes to Maltese for suggesting such a gentle cartoon in a studio that relied heavily on adversarial relationships in its films, and credit to Jones for agreeing to make it. It also provided rich material for production designer Maurice Noble's vision of the role of animation design in a cartoon. For a film to work as well as this one does means that the material has to resonate with all members of the creative team."

== Trivia ==
At the opening the class is reciting an arithmetic lesson which mirrors the song "Inchworm", made popular in 1952 by Danny Kaye in the film Hans Christian Andersen.

== Home media ==
This short is included on Disc 2 of the Looney Tunes Golden Collection: Volume 2 DVD set via the Adventures of the Road Runner bonus feature, Disc 3 of the Warner Bros. Home Entertainment Academy Awards Animation Collection DVD set and on Disc 2 of the Looney Tunes Platinum Collection: Volume 1 DVD and Blu-ray Disc sets.
