= Father of the Bird =

1997 film by Stephen A. Fossati

- Directed by: Stephen A. Fossati
- Story by: Stephen A. Fossati
- Produced by: Chuck Jones; Linda Jones Clough
- Starring: Joe Alaskey; June Foray
- Music by: George Daugherty; Cameron Patrick
- Animation by: Tom Decker; Patrick Gleeson; Roberto Casale
- Color process: Technicolor
- Production companies: Warner Bros. Family Entertainment; Warner Bros. Animation; Chuck Jones Film Productions
- Distributed by: Warner Bros. Pictures
- Release date: November 14, 1997
- Running time: 8 minutes
- Language: English

Father of the Bird is a 1997 traditionally animated Looney Tunes short film directed by Stephen A. Fossati and produced by Chuck Jones. This short only had a limited theatrical release and was the only other short featuring Sylvester the Cat which Jones' team worked on in which the character speaks (the other being The Scarlet Pumpernickel (the only one of the two directed by Jones himself)). This was also the final Sylvester cartoon Chuck Jones was involved with. It was also the final Looney Tunes/Merrie Melodies short to have Jones involved in and to use traditional cel animation.

== Plot ==
Sylvester finds a sparrow egg in a nest. Before he can eat it for breakfast however, a little bird hatches out and calls him "Mama." He warms to the idea of being a father and instead of eating it, he protects the bird throughout a series of near-disasters.

== Home media ==
The short was released as a bonus on Looney Tunes Platinum Collection, Volume One.
