= Three Little Bops =

1957 animated short film directed by Friz Freleng

- Title card
- Directed by: Friz Freleng
- Story by: Warren Foster
- Starring: Stan Freberg (all voices)
- Edited by: Treg Brown
- Music by: Shorty Rogers
- Animation by: Gerry Chiniquy; Bob Matz; Harry Love
- Layouts by: Hawley Pratt
- Backgrounds by: Irv Wyner
- Color process: Technicolor
- Production company: Warner Bros. Cartoons
- Distributed by: Warner Bros. Pictures; The Vitaphone Corporation
- Release date: January 5, 1957
- Running time: 6:43
- Country: United States
- Language: English

Three Little Bops is a 1957 American animated musical comedy film, directed by Friz Freleng and written by Warren Foster. A takeoff on The Three Little Pigs told as a hip, jazzy musical filled with jive talk, the short features the voice of Stan Freberg, with music provided by jazz composer/trumpeter Shorty Rogers. It was released by Warner Bros. Pictures on January 5, 1957 as part of the Looney Tunes series.

== Plot ==
Presented primarily in the style of twelve-bar blues, the short opens with a display of the book that shows the Three Little Pigs who used to play pipes and dance jigs but now play modern instruments and perform as The Three Little Bops.

During a Bops gig at the House of Straw, the Big Bad Wolf shows up (and quotes the title of the 1947 Dizzy Gillespie jazz song "Ool-Ya-Koo"), demonstrates that he is friendly by shaking hands and states that he wants to sit in with the band. He immediately shows he is a terrible trumpet player, however, so the pigs, labelling him a square, throw him out. Insulted, the Wolf retaliates by using the trumpet to blow down the House of Straw, forcing the pigs to go to the Dew Drop Inn, the House of Sticks.

Things go well (including the piano playing pig doing an imitation of Liberace's "I wish my brother George was here"), until the Wolf arrives and sits in again. The audience calls for the pigs to "throw the square out", which they do. The Wolf retaliates by blowing down the Dew Drop Inn. The pigs then realize that to escape the Wolf's "windy tricks", they must become the band of choice at the House of Bricks (built on May 1, 1776, according to a cornerstone).

The House of Bricks has a "No Wolves Allowed" rule, so when the Wolf tries to get in, he is punched in the face by a bouncer. He then unsuccessfully tries to ram the door down with a log. The Wolf falls back on trying to use his trumpet to blow down the building, but soon runs out of breath.

He disguises himself, reentering in a fur coat, playing a perfect rendition of the Charleston on a ukulele (cut short when the piano player pig recognizes him and tosses a banana peel). The Wolf returns, hidden inside a houseplant. He pops up and begins playing his trumpet, but the pig playing the double bass shoots a plunger off the strings and blasts the Wolf out of the building. For his third try, the Wolf shows up in a drum major outfit playing a big bass drum to the tune of "Don't Give Up the Ship". The Bops' drummer throws a dart and deflates the bass drum. Humiliated, the Wolf leaves. The pigs shut and lock the door to ensure he cannot get in again.

He returns with a large cylinder of TNT and says, "I'll show those pigs that I'm not stuck! If I can't blow it down, I'll blow it up!" One of the pigs blows out the fuse, so the Wolf carries the cylinder a few feet away from the door to light it a second time. He has moved too far away and as he is carrying it back to the door of the building, it explodes and the Wolf is killed.

The narrator says that the explosion that killed the Wolf did not send him to Heaven but down to "the other place", where his trumpet playing improves. When the pigs hear this, one of them says, "The Big Bad Wolf, he learned the rule: you gotta get hot to play real cool!" The Wolf's spirit then rises up through the floor and, now playing expertly, joins in for the final notes, prompting the pigs to alter their band's name to "The Three Little Bops Plus One".

== Credits ==
Instrument credits are believed to be:

- Vocals – Stan Freberg (credited on the short)
- Saxophone – Pepper Adams
- Trumpet/flugelhorn – Shorty Rogers (credited on the short)
- Piano – Pete Jolly
- Guitar – Barney Kessel
- Bass – Red Callender (or possibly Red Mitchell and / or Joe Mondragon)
- Drums – Stan Levey (or possibly Shelly Manne)

This is one of rare Warner Bros. cartoons to not feature voice contributions from Mel Blanc in any capacity during the period of his exclusive contract with the studio. It is also one of three from that period to credit anyone other than Blanc (the others were The Mouse that Jack Built, which credits the cast of The Jack Benny Program, of which Blanc was a cast member and thus was credited accordingly, and The Unmentionables, which credits Blanc and Ralph James). Though Freberg contributed voices to many other Warner Bros. cartoons, he did not receive credit for them. It is also one of the few Looney Tunes shorts not to use the "That's all, Folks" endline.

== Reception ==
Three Little Bops was included in Jerry Beck's book The 100 Greatest Looney Tunes Cartoons. In the book, professor of musicology Daniel Goldmark writes, "Three Little Bops is a return to the swinging sounds that once dominated the Warner Bros. cartoons. Los Angeles boasted a thriving jazz scene in the 1950s, so not only was the studio able to feature trumpeter Shorty Rogers, it also made great use of comedian (and voice artist) Stan Freberg as the cartoon's hep narrator. The entire cartoon is told in scatlike rhyme, and the pigs really play some smokin' jazz — as does the wolf once he finally gets 'hot' down in hell."

== Home media ==
- LaserDisc — Looney Tunes: Curtain Calls: Classic Music and Show Business Cartoons
- VHS — Sing-Along Looney Tunes (edited)
- DVD — Looney Tunes Golden Collection: Volume 2, Disc 4
- DVD — Looney Tunes Spotlight Collection: Volume 2, Disc 2
- Blu-ray, DVD — Looney Tunes Platinum Collection: Volume 1, Disc 2
- DVD — Looney Tunes Musical Masterpieces

== Later appearances ==
- The Big Bad Wolf, who first appeared in Little Red Walking Hood and had previously appeared as Uncle Big Bad in The Turn-Tale Wolf, would appear in another two Golden Age cartoons: Now Hare This and False Hare, also as Uncle Big Bad. This was one of two Golden Age appearances in a Friz Freleng cartoon; he had previously appeared, also with the Three Little Pigs, in Pigs in a Polka.
- This cartoon was included (in slightly edited form) as part of the 1981 film The Looney Looney Looney Bugs Bunny Movie; presented as part of a fictitious awards show called "The Oswald Awards", it features brief "interviews" with both the Big Bad Wolf and the Three Little Pigs (with Freberg reprising the roles) as they arrive at the theater with Porky Pig during the awards pre-show.
- The Big Bad Wolf made an appearance in the 1983 film Daffy Duck's Fantastic Island. He was standing in the line where everybody is getting their wishes from the island's famous wishing well, but he was wearing shoes instead of showing his bare feet.
- The Three Little Pigs and The Big Bad Wolf make a cameo appearance on the bleachers watching the basketball playoff against the Monstars and the Toon Squad in Space Jam.

== See also ==
- Looney Tunes and Merrie Melodies filmography (1950–59)
