= Dick Beals =

American actor (1927–2012)

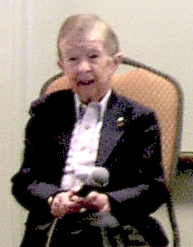
- Beals in 2009
- Born: Richard Beals; March 16, 1927; Detroit, Michigan, U.S.
- Died: May 29, 2012 (aged 85); Vista, California, U.S.
- Education: Michigan State University
- Occupations: Actor; radio performer
- Years active: 1935–2005

Richard Beals (March 16, 1927 – May 29, 2012) was an American actor and radio performer, who performed many voices in his career, which spanned the period from the early 1950s into the 21st century. Beals voiced "dozens of children, both male and female", according to Mark Evanier's obituary of him.

Perhaps his most recognizable characterization was the voice of the stop-motion animation figure called "Speedy Alka-Seltzer", featured in television commercials for more than 50 years.

== Early life ==
Beals was born in Detroit, Michigan, on March 16, 1927, and graduated in 1949 from Michigan State University (MSU), where he majored in radio broadcasting and puppetry. He covered intramural sports and performed in weekly radio dramas for the campus radio station WKAR. Beals was also a member of the Michigan State cheerleading squad.

== Career ==
In 1935, an old schoolmate of Beals' mother who was working for the Jam Handy studios, which was producing advertising motion pictures and other film short subjects, was looking for small children to appear in their feature films. Eventually, Beals' mother agreed and Beals would begin acting in several Jam Handy films at the age of eight years old over the next couple of years before attending college.

In January 1949, as a senior at MSU, Beals got a call to do a radio commercial for WXYZ, Detroit. After the show, the director asked him to be on call for all the children's voices as well as those of small, talking animals on all three network radio shows produced by WXYZ: The Lone Ranger, Green Hornet and Challenge of the Yukon.

Beals was a member of the cast of The Hudson Sketchbook, the "first regularly scheduled TV program to go on the air in Detroit," on the original WWJ-TV (now WDIV-TV).

In 1952, after performing in an episode of The Green Hornet, WXYZ station manager Jack McCarthy referred Beals to Forrest Owen of Wade Advertising. Owen showed Beals a rendering of a proposed product spokesman for their client, Alka-Seltzer and had him record a voice audition. Four months later, Beals was notified that he had been selected as the voice for Speedy Alka-Seltzer as well as the voice of Sticky, the Vaseline mascot.

Beals moved to Los Angeles where he continued making commercials as Speedy Alka-Seltzer and also provided voices for other commercials, such as Alka-Seltzer, Oscar Mayer, the Campbell Soup Kids, and Bob's Big Boy. Beals recorded his first Speedy Alka-Seltzer television commercial in 1953, doing a total of 225 in his career.

In 1952, Beals was hired to do the voice for Andy Panda and Oswald The Lucky Rabbit in the animated short Team Play produced by Walter Lantz for Autolite. The following year, Beals voiced Ralph Phillips, a Walter Mitty-type boy in From A to Z-Z-Z-Z by Warner Bros. Cartoons. The cartoon was nominated for an Academy Award.

Beals continued doing voices for Warner Bros. Cartoons animated short films, often as uncredited secondary characters. When Hanna-Barbera started with The Flintstones, and then The Jetsons, Beals provided many of the children's voices on those shows, sometimes performing several different minor characters on the same show. One of his recurring roles was as Mr. Spacely's son Arthur on The Jetsons with the exception of season 3.

From 1960 to 1964, Beals played the voice of Davey Hansen, as well as other child voices, on Davey and Goliath. He did not do any voices for that series after 1965, when Norma MacMillan replaced him as Davey.

Although several sources say that Beals voiced Gumby in the 1960s series, Beals himself refuted this claim in a 2001 interview.

Beals provided voices for both the characters "Yank" and "Dan" of the "American Eagles" troupe in the mid-1960s cartoon series Roger Ramjet. In 1967, Beals was the singing voice of child actor Bobby Riha as "Jack" in the NBC-TV special Jack and the Beanstalk starring Gene Kelly. He was the voice of Buzz Conroy, the boy scientist on Frankenstein Jr. and The Impossibles, and Richie Rich's mischievous cousin, Reggie Van Dough on Richie Rich. Beals was also the voice of Birdboy on Birdman and the Galaxy Trio as well as the voices for Buzzer Bell, Jasper N. Parks and on rare occasions sharing the voice role of Nancy Wible as Shrinking Violette on The Funny Company. He also provided the voice for the recurring villain Tiny Tom in the 1966–1969 cartoon series The Lone Ranger. In 1968, he was the singing voice (for Teddy Eccles) in The Little Drummer Boy.

In 1955, Beals appeared in an episode of The Bob Cummings Show, where he played a convincing 10-year old brat.

A unique on-camera role came in a 1960 episode of Peter Gunn called "The Dummy", in which he played a human ventriloquist's dummy that performs the act on its own, since the ventriloquist had lost his voice. His other live action role was in the 1950s television series Craig Kennedy, Criminologist, playing as Bobby "Butch" Moore in the episode "The Kid Brother".

In the 1980s, Beals owned an ad agency. During the late 1980s, Beals provided the voices for various characters on Garfield and Friends with the most major character he voiced being Jon's cruel nephew Rosco, as well as doing voice work In the 1987 release of Arnold Leibovit's The Puppetoon Movie.

From 1989–1993, he played Nicholas Adamsworth on the Focus on the Family radio drama Adventures in Odyssey.

In 1996, Beals provided the voice of the Pinocchio puppet in the horror film Pinocchio's Revenge.

Beals continued doing occasional voice acting, appearing as a guest at Old Time Radio conventions and as a motivational speaker. He was active as an alumnus of Michigan State University and in his spare time he enjoyed spending time on his yacht Think Big.

He retired from voice acting in late 2005, his final voice acting role was Baby-Faced Moonbeam in the animated television series Duck Dodgers.

== Personal life ==
Beals wrote in his autobiography, Think Big, that his high voice and boyish appearance were due to a glandular problem; he did not go through puberty (much like Walter Tetley, who had provided the voice for Sherman on The Bullwinkle Show). Beals was 4 foot 7 inches (just under 140 cm) tall and weighed just under 70 pounds (about 31 kg). Despite his short stature, he flew planes using modified controls.

== Death ==
Beals died on May 29, 2012, at Vista Gardens Memory Care in Vista, California, at the age of 85.

== Filmography ==
=== Film ===
| Year | Title | Role | Notes |
|---|---|---|---|
| 1947 | Wings for Roger Windsock | Roger Windsock (voice) | Short film; uncredited |
| 1953 | From A to Z-Z-Z-Z | Ralph Phillips (voice) | Short film; uncredited |
| 1957 | Boyhood Daze | Ralph Phillips (voice) | Short film; uncredited |
| 1959 | The Snow Queen | The Prince (voice) | English version |
| 1987 | The Puppetoon Movie | Speedy Alka-Seltzer | Voice |
| 1996 | Pinocchio's Revenge | Pinocchio (voice) | Final film role |

=== Television ===
| Year | Title | Role | Notes |
|---|---|---|---|
| 1952 | Craig Kennedy, Criminologist | Bobby 'Butch' Moore | Episode: "The Kid Brother"; credited as Richard Beals |
| 1955 | My Little Margie | Head Alien | Episode: "Vern's Flying Saucer"; credited as Richard Beals |
| 1955 | The Bob Cummings Show | 10-year-old Brat | Unknown episode |
| 1960 | Peter Gunn | Rinaldo | Episode: "The Dummy"; credited as Richard Beals |
| 1960 | Gumby | Naughty Boy (voice) | Episode: "Santa-Witch" |
| 1960–1965 | Davey and Goliath | David 'Davey' Hansen / Teddy / Nat / Joe / Boys / Timmy / Tommy / Sailor / Jody / Sam / Henry / Nathaniel / Barney / Mike / Boy on Sled (voices) | Main cast; 40 episodes; credited as Richard Beals |
| 1962 | The Road Runner Show | Additional voices | Episode: "Adventures of the Road Runner" |
| 1962 | The Jetsons | Arthur Spacely (voice) | 3 episodes |
| 1963 | The Funny Company | Buzzer Bell / Shrinking Violet (voices) | Main cast; 155 episodes |
| 1964 | The Famous Adventures of Mr. Magoo | Additional voices | |
| 1964 | The Flintstones | Kids / Elf #1 / The Scouts (voices) | 2 episodes |
| 1965 | Roger Ramjet | Yank / Dan (voices) | 7 episodes |
| 1965–1966 | The Secret Squirrel Show | Clyde / Wee Winnie / 2nd Young Boy / Broom / Young Boy / Son / Boy / Tom Thumb / Scouts / Eddie / Students / Charley / Surfer / Tommy / Additional voices | 12 episodes |
| 1966–1967 | Frankenstein Jr. and the Impossibles | Buzz Conroy (voice) | 18 episodes |
| 1966–1968 | The Lone Ranger | Tiny Tom (voice) | 2 episodes |
| 1967 | Jack and the Beanstalk | Jack (singing voice) | TV movie |
| 1967 | Birdman | Birdboy (voice) | Episode: "The Return of Vulturo" |
| 1979 | Casper and the Angels | Additional voices | Episode: "Love at First Fright/Saving Grace in Outer Space" |
| 1980–1981 | The Richie Rich/Scooby-Doo Show | Reggie van Dough (voice) | 21 episodes |
| 1980–1983 | Richie Rich | Reggie van Dough (voice) | 35 episodes |
| 1983 | ABC Weekend Specials | Floog / Flub / Blib / Little Green Man #2 / Og Boy / Flan (voices) | 2 episodes; credited as Richard Beals |
| 1983 | Saturday Supercade | Additional voices | Episode: "The Who-Took-Toadwalker Story/Banana Bikers/Disc Derby Fiasco/Rocky Mountain Monkey Business" |
| 1983 | The Biskitts | Scat (voice) | 13 episodes |
| 1987 | DuckTales | Additional voices | Episode: "Superdoo!"; credited as Richard Beals |
| 1989 | Dink, the Little Dinosaur | Additional voices | Episode: "Crusty's Baby/The Gentle Hunter" |
| 1989 | Garfield and Friends | Roscoe (voice) | 2 episodes |
| 1992–1993 | The Addams Family | N. J. Normanmeyer (voice) | 10 episodes |
| 1995 | That's Warner Bros.! | Various characters | |
| 1996 | The Bugs n' Daffy Show | Various characters | |
| 2004–2005 | Duck Dodgers | Baby-Faced Moonbeam (voice) | 2 episodes; final role |

=== Radio ===
List of voice performances in radio series
| Year | Title | Role | Notes |
|---|---|---|---|
| 1989–1993 | Adventures in Odyssey | Nicholas Adamsworth | 4 episodes |

=== Commercials ===
| Year | Title | Role | Notes |
|---|---|---|---|
| 1953–1976 | Alka-Seltzer | Speedy Alka-Seltzer | Voice |
