= Warner Bros. Home Entertainment Academy Awards Animation Collection =

DVD set released by Warner Home Video

Warner Bros.' library of Oscar-nominated cartoons were made available in a 3-disc DVD set released by Warner Bros. Home Entertainment in 2008. It included their own Looney Tunes and Merrie Melodies, as well as Tom and Jerry, Droopy, and other classic MGM cartoons, together with entries from Max Fleischer's Popeye and Superman series (both originally released by Paramount Pictures). All cartoons selected for this release were nominated for the Academy Award for Best Animated Short Film, with the exception of the film So Much for So Little, which won the Academy Award for Documentary Short Subject. A total of 41 cartoons (completely uncut and unedited) were chosen for this set, 15 of them being Oscar winners.

Many of the Looney Tunes/Merrie Melodies shorts featured on this collection have also been released on the Looney Tunes Golden Collection DVD sets, but this set includes a handful of others. The cartoons A Wild Hare and Hiawatha's Rabbit Hunt, which were previously reissued as Blue Ribbons, have their full original titles restored, the latter having its original titles first restored on the 1995 Turner print. The cartoon From A to Z-Z-Z-Z, previously released as a Blue Ribbon but retaining its full slate of credits, is shown here in its original format. All the Tom and Jerry shorts have been previously released on the Spotlight Collections, but most of them here are presented restored and remastered, previous copies, as for Mouse Trouble and Quiet Please!, being poor transfers of Turner broadcast TV prints. Three MGM cartoons, Touché, Pussy Cat!, Good Will to Men, and One Droopy Knight, are presented in their original Cinemascope aspect ratios.

To this day, this is Warner's only DVD release of classic animation to feature a variety of different cartoon studios. Warner has also released each of the discs separately.

== Disc 1 ==
All 15 cartoons on this disc won Academy Awards

#	Title	Studio	Star(s)	Year	Director(s)
1	The Milky Way	MGM		1940	Rudolf Ising
2	The Yankee Doodle Mouse	MGM	Tom and Jerry	1943	William Hanna; Joseph Barbera
3	Mouse Trouble	MGM	Tom and Jerry	1944	William Hanna; Joseph Barbera
4	Quiet Please!	MGM	Tom and Jerry, Spike	1945	William Hanna; Joseph Barbera
5	The Cat Concerto	MGM	Tom and Jerry	1947	William Hanna; Joseph Barbera
6	Tweetie Pie	Warner Bros.	Sylvester, Tweety	1947	Friz Freleng
7	The Little Orphan	MGM	Tom and Jerry, Tuffy	1949	William Hanna; Joseph Barbera
8	For Scent-imental Reasons	Warner Bros.	Pepé Le Pew, Penelope Pussycat	1949	Chuck Jones
9	So Much for So Little	Warner Bros.		1949	Chuck Jones
10	The Two Mouseketeers	MGM	Tom and Jerry, Tuffy	1952	William Hanna; Joseph Barbera
11	Johann Mouse	MGM	Tom and Jerry	1953	William Hanna; Joseph Barbera
12	Speedy Gonzales	Warner Bros.	Speedy Gonzales, Sylvester	1955	Friz Freleng
13	Birds Anonymous	Warner Bros.	Sylvester, Tweety, Clarence Cat	1957	Friz Freleng
14	Knighty Knight Bugs	Warner Bros.	Bugs Bunny, Yosemite Sam	1958	Friz Freleng
15	The Dot and the Line	MGM		1965	Chuck Jones; Maurice Noble (co-director)

=== Special features ===
==== Audio bonuses ====
- Music-only tracks
  - Speedy Gonzales
  - The Dot and the Line
- Audio Commentaries
  - Mark Kausler on Quiet Please!
  - Eric Goldberg on The Cat Concerto and The Dot and the Line
  - Greg Ford on Duck Amuck
  - Jerry Beck on Duck Amuck

== Disc 2 ==
All 14 cartoons on this disc were nominated for Academy Awards, but did not win

#	Title	Studio	Star(s)	Year	Director(s)
1	Popeye the Sailor Meets Sindbad the Sailor	Fleischer; Paramount	Popeye, Olive, Wimpy, Bluto	1936	Dave Fleischer
2	Peace on Earth	MGM		1939	Hugh Harman
3	A Wild Hare*	Warner Bros.	Bugs Bunny (debut), Elmer Fudd	1940	Tex Avery
4	Puss Gets the Boot	MGM	Jasper, Jinx	1940	William Hanna; Joseph Barbera
5	Superman	Fleischer; Paramount	Superman, Lois	1941	Dave Fleischer
6	Hiawatha's Rabbit Hunt	Warner Bros.	Bugs Bunny, Hiawatha	1941	Friz Freleng
7	Rhapsody in Rivets	Warner Bros.		1941	Friz Freleng
8	The Night Before Christmas	MGM	Tom and Jerry	1941	William Hanna; Joseph Barbera
9	Blitz Wolf	MGM		1942	Tex Avery
10	Pigs in a Polka	Warner Bros.		1943	Friz Freleng
11	Swooner Crooner	Warner Bros.	Porky Pig	1944	Frank Tashlin
12	Walky Talky Hawky	Warner Bros.	Foghorn Leghorn, Henery Hawk, Barnyard Dawg	1946	Robert McKimson
13	Dr. Jekyll and Mr. Mouse	MGM	Tom and Jerry	1947	William Hanna; Joseph Barbera
14	Mouse Wreckers	Warner Bros.	Hubie and Bertie, Claude Cat, Hector the Bulldog	1949	Chuck Jones

(*): Original opening title card restored for this release, as the releases in The Golden Age of Looney Tunes and Looney Tunes Golden Collection: Volume 3 borrowed the opening title card for A Gander at Mother Goose

=== Special features ===
==== Audio bonuses ====
- Audio commentaries
  - Jerry Beck, Leslie Cabarga, Ray Pointer and Bob Jaques on Popeye the Sailor Meets Sindbad the Sailor
  - Greg Ford on Peace on Earth and A Wild Hare
  - Mark Kausler on Puss Gets the Boot
  - Paul Dini on Superman
  - Eric Goldberg on Blitz Wolf
  - Jerry Beck on Walky Talky Hawky

== Disc 3 ==
All 12 cartoons on this disc were nominated for Academy Awards, but did not win

#	Title	Studio	Star(s)	Year	Director(s)
1	Hatch Up Your Troubles	MGM	Tom and Jerry	1949	William Hanna; Joseph Barbera
2	Jerry's Cousin	MGM	Tom and Jerry	1951	William Hanna; Joseph Barbera
3	Little Johnny Jet	MGM		1953	Tex Avery
4	Touché, Pussy Cat!	MGM	Tom and Jerry, Tuffy	1954	William Hanna; Joseph Barbera
5	From A to Z-Z-Z-Z	Warner Bros.	Ralph Phillips	1954	Chuck Jones
6	Sandy Claws	Warner Bros.	Sylvester, Tweety, Granny	1955	Friz Freleng
7	Good Will to Men	MGM		1955	William Hanna; Joseph Barbera
8	Tabasco Road	Warner Bros.	Speedy Gonzales	1957	Robert McKimson
9	One Droopy Knight	MGM	Droopy, Butch Bulldog	1957	Michael Lah
10	High Note	Warner Bros.		1960	Chuck Jones
11	Nelly's Folly	Warner Bros.		1961	Chuck Jones; Maurice Noble (co-director); Abe Levitow (co-director)
12	Now Hear This	Warner Bros.		1963	Chuck Jones; Maurice Noble (co-director)

=== Special features ===
==== Audio bonuses ====
- Music-only tracks
  - Little Johnny Jet
  - Touché, Pussy Cat!
  - Tabasco Road
  - One Droopy Knight
- Vocal Chorus section isolated audio track hosted by Greg Ford
  - Good Will to Men
- Audio commentaries
  - Amid Amidi on From A to Z-Z-Z-Z and Now Hear This

==== Bonus cartoon ====
- What's Cookin' Doc? (USA Turner print)

==== Documentary ====
- Drawn for Glory: Animation's Triumph at the Oscars

== Omitted nominees ==
These are eleven classic theatrical cartoons in the Warner Bros./Turner Entertainment library that were nominated for Best Animated Short, but were not included in this DVD collection for unknown reasons. Some had been released on the Looney Tunes Golden Collection DVDs, while others turned up on later sets. The following missing nominated shorts are:

#	Title	Studio	Star(s)	Year	Director(s)	Notes
1	It's Got Me Again!	Warner Bros.		1932	Rudolf Ising	Looney Tunes Golden Collection: Volume 3 (DVD, 2005) (extra, unrestored); Looney Tunes Platinum Collection: Volume 2 (Blu-Ray, 2012) (extra, unrestored)
2	The Calico Dragon	MGM		1935	Rudolf Ising	Roberta (DVD 2006) (extra, unrestored)
3	The Old Mill Pond	MGM	Jazz Frogs	1936	Hugh Harman	Born to Dance (DVD 2008) (extra, unrestored and censored)
4	Detouring America	Warner Bros.		1939	Tex Avery	Each Dawn I Die (DVD 2006) (extra, unrestored); Each Dawn I Die (Blu-Ray 2021) (extra, unrestored)
5	The Rookie Bear	MGM	Barney Bear	1941	Rudolf Ising	Lady Be Good (DVD 2008) (extra, unrestored)
6	Greetings Bait	Warner Bros.	The Wacky Worm	1943	Friz Freleng	Action in the North Atlantic (DVD 2006) (extra, unrestored); Looney Tunes Collector's Choice: Volume 2 (Blu-Ray) (restored)
7	Life with Feathers	Warner Bros.	Sylvester the Cat (debut)	1945	Friz Freleng	Looney Tunes Platinum Collection: Volume 3 (Blu-Ray/DVD 2014) (restored)
8	Mexicali Shmoes	Warner Bros.	Speedy Gonzales	1959	Friz Freleng	Looney Tunes Golden Collection: Volume 4 (DVD 2006) (restored); Looney Tunes Platinum Collection: Volume 2 (Blu-Ray/DVD 2012) (restored)
9	Mouse and Garden	Warner Bros.	Sylvester the Cat	1960	Friz Freleng	Looney Tunes Golden Collection: Volume 4 (DVD 2006) (restored); Looney Tunes Platinum Collection: Volume 3 (Blu-Ray/DVD 2014) (restored)
10	Beep Prepared	Warner Bros.	Wile E. Coyote and the Road Runner	1961	Chuck Jones; Maurice Noble (co-director)	Looney Tunes Platinum Collection: Volume 3 (Blu-Ray/DVD 2014) (restored)
11	The Pied Piper of Guadalupe	Warner Bros.	Speedy Gonzales; Sylvester the Cat	1961	Friz Freleng; Hawley Pratt (co-director)	Looney Tunes Golden Collection: Volume 4 (DVD 2006) (restored); Looney Tunes Platinum Collection: Volume 3 (Blu-Ray/DVD 2014) (restored)
