= Nelly's Folly =

1961 cartoon short directed by Chuck Jones

- Title card
- Directed by: Chuck Jones; Abe Levitow; Maurice Noble
- Story by: Chuck Jones; David Detiege
- Starring: Gloria Wood; Mel Blanc; John A. Ford; Ed Prentiss
- Narrated by: Ed Prentiss
- Edited by: Treg Brown
- Music by: Milt Franklyn
- Animation by: Ken Harris; Tom Ray; Richard Thompson; Ben Washam
- Backgrounds by: Philip DeGuard
- Color process: Technicolor
- Production company: Warner Bros. Cartoons
- Distributed by: Warner Bros. Pictures; The Vitaphone Corporation
- Release date: December 30, 1961 (USA)
- Running time: 7:23
- Language: English

Nelly's Folly is a 1961 Warner Bros. Merrie Melodies cartoon short written and directed by Chuck Jones released on December 30, 1961. Like One Froggy Evening the film is about the discovery of a singing animal, with a narrative focus on the animal rather than its human manager.

== Plot ==
In Africa a giraffe named Nelly captivates other animals with her melodious singing. A passing hunter urges her to go professional and offers her a contract.

Leaving behind her jungle home, Nelly ventures to New York City, eager to explore the allure of show business. Initially thrust into the world of advertising and live performances, she eventually becomes a successful singer and fashion icon, epitomizing the facade of fame. However, as her career flourishes, Nelly grapples with feelings of loneliness and disillusionment, longing for genuine companionship.

Her quest for love leads her to the zoo, where a married giraffe makes a pass at her. She has an affair with the giraffe, resulting in a public scandal and warning from her agent. After one of her shows opens to an empty house which the narrator claims was the worse insult of all, she spirals into obscurity where the newspaper talks about the empty house, her work in foreign movies, and her agent leaving her. Nelly is rejected by her beau who kisses his wife.

Disheartened by the superficiality of fame, Nelly weeps despondently over a bridge railing. The narrator says that her loyal fans hope she made her way home and found peace among her friends. Nelly is shown singing a sad tune in Africa as her friends listen in. Just then, a male giraffe chimes in and the two fall in love.

== Crew ==
- Animation: Richard Thompson, Ben Washam, Tom Ray, Ken Harris
- Layouts: Maurice Noble
- Backgrounds: Philip DeGuard
- Film Editor: Treg Brown
- Voice Characterizations: Gloria Wood, Mel Blanc, Ed Prentiss
- Music: Milt Franklyn
- Produced by David H. DePatie
- Co-directors: Maurice Noble, Abe Levitow
- Story: Dave Detiege, Chuck Jones
- Directed by Chuck Jones

== Music ==
- "Auld Lang Syne"
- "The Flower of Gower Gulch" (originally featured in Drip-Along Daffy); written by Michael Maltese
- "Voices of Spring"; Johann Strauss II
- "Aloha Oe"; Queen Liliuokalani
- "Columbia, Gem of the Ocean" (aka "The Red, White and Blue")
- "Then You'll Remember Me", from the opera The Bohemian Girl

== Accolades ==
Nelly's Folly was nominated for an Academy Award for Best Animated Short Film in 1962, but lost out to Surogat.

== Home media ==
DVD:

- Warner Bros. Home Entertainment Academy Awards Animation Collection
- Looney Tunes Platinum Collection: Volume 3
- Sex and the Single Woman

== Popular culture ==
Nelly has made different cameos since this cartoon:

- Nelly makes a cameo in Bugs Bunny's Elephant Parade, voiced by Tress MacNeille
- Nelly makes a cameo in Coyote vs. Acme. She was among the Looney Tunes characters found outside of the law firm Avery, Jones and Maltese.
