= Al Tudi Tuhak =

Short animated film made in 1999

Al Tudi Tuhak, meaning "a long time ago" in the Lushootseed language, was a short animated film made in 1999 based on the folk culture of the people of the Northwestern coast of the U.S. It won the student Academy Award in 2000, and was nominated for best short film at the 2000 "Annie" awards. The film was written, directed, and produced by Tod Polson at California Institute of the Arts. Other animation was provided by Ben Jones, and Mike Polvani. Ink and paint was supervised by Bernadette Gonzales, and used latex housepaint. The score and sound was created by William Benson, who researched tribal music in the northwest coast particularly for this project. The film was shot at Stokes/Kohne, and at Fil-Cartoons in the Philippines.

The film was the first installment of an intended series of short films called "Noble Tales". Noble Tales was created by animation legend, Maurice Noble, and his trainees who called themselves the "Noble Boys". Maurice also provided the narration for the film.
