= The Scarlet Pumpernickel =

1950 film by Chuck Jones

- Title card
- Directed by: Charles M. Jones
- Story by: Michael Maltese
- Starring: Mel Blanc; Marian Richman
- Music by: Carl Stalling
- Animation by: Phil Monroe; Ben Washam; Lloyd Vaughan; Ken Harris
- Layouts by: Robert Gribbroek
- Backgrounds by: Peter Alvarado
- Color process: Technicolor
- Production company: Warner Bros. Cartoons
- Distributed by: Warner Bros. Pictures; The Vitaphone Corporation
- Release date: March 4, 1950
- Running time: 7:02
- Country: United States
- Language: English

The Scarlet Pumpernickel is a 1950 Warner Bros. Looney Tunes theatrical cartoon short, directed by Chuck Jones and written by Michael Maltese. The cartoon was released on March 4, 1950, and stars Daffy Duck along with a number of other prominent Looney Tunes characters. The title is a play on the 1905 novel The Scarlet Pimpernel.

In 1994 it was voted No. 31 of the 50 Greatest Cartoons of all time by members of the animation field.

== Plot ==
Daffy Duck, tired of comedic roles, pitches a dramatic script called The Scarlet Pumpernickel to studio head J.L. In the story, the daring Scarlet Pumpernickel (played by Daffy) outsmarts the Lord High Chamberlain (Porky Pig) to rescue Lady Melissa (Melissa Duck) from having to marry the villainous Grand Duke (Sylvester the Cat).

When Daffy realizes that he has neglected to write an ending, he ad-libs a chaotic climax involving various natural disasters. J.L., still unimpressed, asks, "Is that all?"; Daffy, exhausted, declares that the story ends with the Scarlet Pumpernickel's comedic "suicide", as he produces a revolver and fires a shot through his director's cap before dropping to the floor. Still lying down, Daffy looks up at the audience and comments to them, "It's getting so you have to kill yourself to sell a story around here!" before the cartoon irises out.

== Production notes ==
The Scarlet Pumpernickel is notable for boasting a large cast of Looney Tunes star characters, including Daffy, Porky, Sylvester, Melissa (who is named for the first time) and Elmer Fudd who all have starring roles, alongside Mama Bear from Jones' Three Bears series and Henery Hawk, who make non-speaking cameo appearances.

Mel Blanc voices Elmer Fudd, who serves as an innkeeper. While Elmer was originally voiced by Arthur Q. Bryan, Blanc imitated Bryan's voice for the character despite his reservations about impersonating another actor.

== Reception ==
Animation historian Greg Ford writes, "It's the 'real-life' Daffy, as seen in the cartoon's wraparound plot of the studio script meeting, that best clues us in to what separates this film from the spate of animated genre parodies currently being churned out. Most modern-day satires trade on anachronism, and the hero and the audience end up complicit in their smug superiority to the antiquated vehicle. But what's funny about The Scarlet Pumpernickel is the tremendous investment its hero puts into his costumed character, and the vast chasm that yawns between Daffy's inflated perception of himself and the highly flawed little black duck that he really is."

== Cast ==
- Mel Blanc as Daffy Duck, Porky Pig, Sylvester, Elmer Fudd, J.L.
- Marian Richman as Melissa Duck

== Home media ==
VHS:

- Carrotblanca
- Looney Tunes Collectors Edition: Running Amuck

Laserdisc:

- Looney Tunes: Curtain Calls

DVD:

- Looney Tunes Golden Collection: Volume 1
- The Essential Daffy Duck

DVD/Blu-Ray:

- Looney Tunes Platinum Collection: Volume 1
