= So Much for So Little =

1949 film

- Directed by: Charles M. Jones; Uncredited: Friz Freleng
- Written by: Friz Freleng (Uncredited); Charles M. Jones
- Starring: Mel Blanc
- Narrated by: Frank Graham
- Edited by: Treg Brown (Uncredited)
- Music by: Carl Stalling
- Animation by: Ben Washam; Ken Harris; Phil Monroe; Lloyd Vaughan
- Layouts by: Robert Gribbroek; Paul Julian; Peter Alvarado
- Backgrounds by: Robert Gribbroek; Paul Julian; Peter Alvarado
- Production companies: Warner Bros. Cartoons; United States Public Health Service
- Distributed by: Warner Bros. Pictures
- Release date: January 1, 1949
- Running time: 10 minutes
- Country: United States
- Language: English

So Much for So Little is a 1949 American animated short documentary film directed by Chuck Jones and Friz Freleng. In 1950, it won an Oscar at the 22nd Academy Awards for Documentary Short Subject, tying with A Chance to Live. It was created by Warner Bros. Cartoons for the United States Public Health Service. As a work of the United States Government, the film is in the public domain. The Academy Film Archive preserved So Much for So Little in 2005. Produced during the Harry S. Truman administration, it attained renewed relevance during the modern Medicare for All movement in the United States, nearly seven decades later.

== Plot ==
film in public domain

The cartoon begins by stating that, annually, 118,481 babies — out of well over two million born — will die before reaching their first birthday. From there, we are shown John E. Jones, a baby who, unless good oversight of the environment is maintained and John himself is provided consistently good healthcare, may potentially add to this statistic.

Most of John's life is depicted: his school years, marriage, later life (as a father), and his golden years. Along the way, health service information is detailed. Before the film ends, it rewinds and returns to John as a baby, reminding the audience about the importance of proper, ongoing care availability to ensure he enjoys a robust, full life. The viewers are informed that it costs each American just three cents a week to safeguard John's, and all babies', well being.

== Home media ==
This documentary short appeared as bonus features in Looney Tunes Golden Collection: Volume 2 and Looney Tunes Platinum Collection: Volume 1. It was remastered in Warner Bros. Home Entertainment Academy Awards Animation Collection: 15 Winners and Warner Bros. Home Entertainment Academy Awards Animation Collection.

== See also ==
- Infant mortality
