= What's Opera, Doc? =

1957 animated short

- Lobby card
- Directed by: Chuck Jones
- Story by: Michael Maltese
- Starring: Mel Blanc; Arthur Q. Bryan
- Edited by: Treg Brown
- Music by: Milt Franklyn
- Animation by: Ken Harris; Richard Thompson; Abe Levitow
- Layouts by: Maurice Noble
- Backgrounds by: Phillip DeGuard
- Color process: Technicolor
- Production company: Warner Bros. Cartoons
- Distributed by: Warner Bros. Pictures
- Release date: July 6, 1957
- Running time: 6:53
- Language: English

What's Opera, Doc? is a 1957 American Warner Bros. Merrie Melodies cartoon directed by Chuck Jones and written by Michael Maltese. The short was released on July 6, 1957, and stars Bugs Bunny and Elmer Fudd.

The story features Elmer chasing Bugs through a parody of Romantic composer Richard Wagner's operas, particularly the Der Ring des Nibelungen (The Ring of the Nibelung) cycle, Der Fliegende Holländer (The Flying Dutchman), and Tannhäuser. It borrows especially heavily from the second opera in the Ring cycle, Die Walküre (The Valkyrie), woven around the typical Bugs–Elmer feud. Most of the dialogue is performed in recitative. The short marks the final appearance of Elmer Fudd in a Chuck Jones cartoon.

It has been widely praised in the animation industry as the greatest animated cartoon that Warner Bros. ever released, and it has been ranked as such in the top 50 animated cartoons of all time. In 1992, the Library of Congress deemed it "culturally, historically or aesthetically significant" and selected it for preservation in the National Film Registry.

== Plot ==
Dressed as the demigod Siegfried (and cutting a less than impressive figure as such), Elmer Fudd is pursuing Bugs Bunny when he finds rabbit tracks and arrives at Bugs' hole. Elmer jams his spear into the hole while singing "Kill the wabbit!" repeatedly (to the tune of "Ride of the Valkyries" from Die Walküre). Bugs sticks his head out from another hole and converses with Elmer about the latter's spear and magic helmet. This prompts a display of Elmer-as-Siegfried's magical powers. Bugs flees in fear, and Elmer pursues.

Elmer stops in his tracks at the sight of the beautiful Valkyrie Brünnhilde (actually Bugs in drag). "Siegfried" and "Brünnhilde" exchange endearments and perform a ballet (based on the Venusberg ballet in Tannhäuser). Bugs' true identity is exposed when his headdress falls off, enraging Elmer. Bugs discards his disguise and runs. Elmer's wrath causes a storm to brew, tearing apart the mountains where Bugs has fled. Upon seeing Bugs' lifeless body, Elmer regrets his wrath and tearfully carries Bugs off to Valhalla (per Act III of Die Walküre). Bugs breaks the fourth wall and raises his head to address the audience, "Well, what did you expect in an opera? A happy ending?" before going back to playing dead again.

== Voice cast ==
- Mel Blanc as Bugs Bunny
- Arthur Q. Bryan as Elmer Fudd (singing, uncredited)

== Production ==
Originally released to theaters by Warner Bros. on July 6, 1957, What's Opera, Doc? features the speaking and singing voices of Mel Blanc and Arthur Q. Bryan as Bugs and Elmer, respectively. This is the third of the three Warner Bros. shorts (the others being Hare Brush and Rabbit Rampage) in which Elmer defeats Bugs, though here the former shows regret for defeating the latter. It was the last Elmer Fudd cartoon directed by Jones.

What's Opera, Doc? required about six times as much work and expense as any of the other six-minute cartoons his production unit was turning out at the time. Jones admitted as much, having described a surreptitious re-allocation of production time to complete the short. During the six minutes of What's Opera, Doc?, Jones lampoons Disney's Fantasia, the contemporary style of ballet, Wagner's perceived ponderous operatic style, and even the by-then clichéd Bugs-and-Elmer formula defined by A Wild Hare.

In his autobiography Chuck Amuck, Jones singled out What's Opera, Doc? "for sheer production quality, magnificent music and wonderful animation, this is probably our (unit's) most elaborate and satisfying production".

=== Story development and layout ===
Michael Maltese wrote the parody's storyline and, in collaboration with Chuck Jones, the comedic lyrics set to Milt Franklyn's arrangements of Wagner's music, including the duet "Return My Love". Some elements of the cartoon drew upon previous animated works at Warner Bros. Maltese himself had originated the concept of depicting Bugs in Valkyrie-styled drag and mounted on a fat horse. Twelve years before the production of What's Opera, Doc?, he had devised a very similar sequence for the cartoon Herr Meets Hare directed by Friz Freleng. That anti-Nazi short was released by Warner Bros. to American theaters in January 1945, just several months before Germany's surrender to Allied forces in World War II. Wearing a blonde braided wig under a medieval horned helmet and carrying a shield, Bugs in that earlier film rides across the screen to the tune of "Pilgrim's Chorus", a selection from Wagner's 1845 opera Tannhäuser.

The highly stylized backdrops and entire color scheme for What's Opera, Doc? were done by art director Maurice Noble and were reportedly so "daring" at the time that the production's overall design "sent the studio into a tizzy". Noble later remarked, "They thought I was bats when I put that bright red on Elmer with those purple skies". According to him, some employees in Warner's Ink and Paint Department assumed that a variety of color specifications he sent to them were errors. Staff, Noble recalled, would ask questions such as "'You really mean you want that magenta red on that?' And I said, 'Yes, that's the way.'"

=== Missing sound effect ===
During the final editing of the short, a "tiny sound effect" was omitted from the master footage, an omission that for decades continued to disturb Chuck Jones whenever he viewed the cartoon after its initial release. In August 2017, the online animation journal The Dot and Line published an interview it conducted with Stephen Fossati, who was Jones' "last protégé", working with him from 1993 until his death in 2002. Fossati in that interview spoke with Eric Vilas-Boas, the co-founder of The Dot and Line, about Jones' "diligence to his craft" and his "relentless perfectionism". With regard to the absent sound effect, Vilas-Boas quoted Fossati's comments about his mentor's 45-year obsession with that "minuscule" detail in the film:

It's like at least probably a dozen, two dozen times that I had the privilege of watching [What's Opera, Doc?] with Chuck... Every time, we'd get to the point where Elmer Fudd is jabbing the spear into the rabbit hole, and Bugs Bunny pops up and freezes, and Elmer Fudd freezes looking at Bugs Bunny, and the plates of his skirt fumble around. It's one of the things that bothered Chuck to the very end... [Chuck] had always intended that those plates fell, inverted, fell on Elmer Fudd's skirt. That they would go Dink, dink, dink, dink, dink, dink, dink, dink, dink, but Treg Brown [the sound editor responsible for the short] forgot to put the sound effects in. [Chuck] would watch it, and every time he would watch it, he'd give a, 'Hurgh.' Sort of like, 'I can't believe that happened.' It was quite remarkable... You can watch it. Watch the cartoon... When, it's 'Kill the wabbit! Kill the wabbit! Kill the wabbit?' He's frozen there, and you just see the 'Dink, dink, dink, dink.' Now you'll hear it.

== Legacy ==
=== "Kill the Wabbit" ===
What's Opera, Doc? is sometimes referred to informally and in online and printed references as "Kill the Wabbit". This unofficial, alternative title is derived from the line sung by Elmer to the tune of Wagner's "Ride of the Valkyries", part of the opening passage from Act Three of Die Walküre, which is also the leitmotif of the Valkyries.

=== Operatic legacy ===
For his 2016 article about the cartoon, "How Bugs Bunny and 'Kill the Wabbit' Inspired a Generation of Opera Stars", Michael Phillips of The Wall Street Journal examined how "a cartoon rabbit and his speech-impaired nemesis" provided many children in 1957 and in the decades thereafter their first, albeit absurd exposure to Wagner's compositions and to the world of opera.

Phillips in his article furnishes comments by various operatic performers and stage crews regarding how seeing What's Opera, Doc? affected them personally as children and in some cases contributed to the early development of their operatic careers. Mezzo-soprano Elizabeth Bishop—a native of Greenville, South Carolina and a featured performer at the Washington National Opera, the San Francisco Opera, and the Metropolitan Opera—stated to Phillips, "'I could sing you the entire cartoon before I knew what opera really was'", adding "'Those of us who didn't freak at the sight of a rabbit in a winged helmet sliding off of the back of a fat horse—we went into opera.'" Jamie Barton, another notable American mezzo-soprano, also shared with Phillips her reactions to seeing the short for the first time in the mid-1990s, when she was a middle-schooler growing up in Athens, Georgia. As she prepared in 2016 for her performance as Waltraute in Wagner's Götterdämmerung at the Kennedy Center in Washington, DC, Barton reflected on What's Opera, Doc? and credited it and Warner Bros.' earlier burlesque short Rabbit of Seville with initially drawing her attention to opera and instilling in her a "love" for classical works, especially the music of Italian composer Gioachino Rossini. "I had never been exposed to opera music before Bugs Bunny", she remarked to Philips.

Michael Heaston, a former pianist for the Dallas Opera and in 2016 an adviser to the director of the Washington National Opera, also described to Phillips his memories of seeing What's Opera, Doc? and other Warner Bros. cartoons as a small child in West Des Moines, Iowa. For Heaston those shorts served as catalysts that ultimately led him to establishing a career in opera. "At a very base level", he noted, "that's what I got from Looney Tunes at a very early age: I learned how to tell stories through music."

=== 50th anniversary, 2007 ===
The enduring audience appeal of What's Opera Doc? extends beyond stage professionals and the borders of the United States. In Canada in 2007, the Toronto Star newspaper featured in its July 8 issue an article by Steve Watt titled "50 glorious years of 'kill da wabbit'". Watt, a cartoon historian and owner of an animation art gallery in Toronto, discusses in his article the golden anniversary that two days earlier had marked the initial release of the short, and he assesses its continuing popularity. "No one", he writes, "who knows and loves 'What's Opera, Doc?' will ever hear Wagner's 'Der Ring des Nibelungen' without hearing, in their own minds, 'Kill da wabbit...kill da wabbit.'" Watt continues, "While classical music aficionados may be offended by that fact, I'm okay with it. More than okay with it." He then describes a past event he had organized and held at a Toronto movie theater, where he presented a selection of Chuck Jones' cartoons. He also describes the audience's reaction to seeing the shorts on the "big screen", including What's Opera, Doc?:

A few years ago, when I staged a tribute to Chuck and his incredible body of work, showing 15 of his greatest cartoons on the big screen as they were originally meant to be seen, it wasn't "What's Opera, Doc?" that got the biggest reaction, initially. The nearly 500 people in attendance gave their most enthusiastic reaction to the opening credits of "One Froggy Evening" featuring Michigan J. Frog, and "Rabbit of Seville," the famous Bugs Bunny-Elmer Fudd barbershop ditty. Both great cartoons, to be sure, and both on any animation historian's top 10. The interesting thing was that for weeks afterward, people told me how moved they were by "What's Opera, Doc?" Some had never seen it before. Others had seen it on TV, but absent the big screen and big sound, they had failed to fall under its spell. Seeing it that day, the way audiences first saw it in 1957, they were enthralled.

Such reactions to "the Wagnerian mini epic" a half century after its release once again attest to the cartoon's unique composition and appeal, qualities that were even recognized as "special" in 1957 by some film-industry publications. For example, the Philadelphia-based journal Motion Picture Exhibitor, which in 1957 had a readership composed largely of theater owners and managers, reviewed the short in August that year and rated it "excellent". The Exhibitor then prophetically observed, "This is far above the usual run of animated cartoons and should find special favor in art houses, believe it or not."

=== Addition to National Film Registry and rankings ===
In 1992, the United States Library of Congress deemed What's Opera, Doc? "'culturally, historically, or aesthetically significant'" and selected it for induction to the National Film Registry, making it the first short cartoon to receive that honor. Three more Warner Bros. cartoons were later inducted into the registry: Duck Amuck in 1999, Porky in Wackyland in 2000, and One Froggy Evening in 2003.

What's Opera, Doc? in 1994 ranked number one on a list of The 50 Greatest Cartoons of all time. The list, compiled by animation historian Jerry Beck, was the result of his surveying and evaluating the opinions of 1,000 professional animators. One of those professionals was Steve Schneider, a longtime employee of Warner Bros. and an authority on the history of animated productions at the studio and an avid collector of cartoon art. In Beck's survey, Schneider provides his own assessment of what makes this short so outstanding:

From its first images, that of the would-be awesome Fantasia-like figures devolving into the shadow of puny lisping Elmer Fudd, the film piles up pretensions only in order to mow them down. Gloriously overbaked, the film reveals that ultimately, it was only cooking up fodder for satire. By reducing Wagner's Ring into a subtext for an archetypal Bugs and Elmer chase, What's Opera, Doc? pulls off a dazzling mingling of reverence and ridicule.

Roger Ebert included What's Opera, Doc?, Duck Amuck and One Froggy Evening in his canon of Great Movies.

== Home media ==
- VHS: The Bugs Bunny/Road Runner Movie
- DVD: Looney Tunes: Golden Collection Volume 2/Looney Tunes: Spotlight Collection Volume 2
- DVD: Looney Tunes: Movie Collection (through The Bugs Bunny/Road Runner Movie)
- DVD: The Essential Bugs Bunny
- Blu-ray: Looney Tunes Platinum Collection: Volume 1
- Blu-ray: Bugs Bunny 80th Anniversary Collection
- iTunes: Bugs Bunny, Vol. 1 (paired with Bugs Bunny Gets the Boid)
- Xbox Live Marketplace: October 23, 2007

== See also ==
- List of American films of 1957
- The 50 Greatest Cartoons
- Rabbit of Seville

Preceded by Piker's Peak	Bugs Bunny Cartoons; 1957	Succeeded by Bugsy and Mugsy
