= Michael Barrier =

American animation historian (born 1940)

- Born: Michael J. Barrier; June 15, 1940 (age 86)
- Occupations: Animation historian Comics historian
- Awards: Inkpot Award (2016)

Michael J. Barrier (born June 15, 1940) is an American animation historian, author, and critic, best known for his extensive research on the history of American animation and comic art. He is the author of Hollywood Cartoons: American Animation in Its Golden Age (1999), The Animated Man: A Life of Walt Disney (2007) and Funnybooks: The Improbable Glories of the Best American Comic Books (2014). Barrier was also the founding editor of Funnyworld, one of the first serious publications dedicated to comics and animation history.

His work focuses on the artistic and industrial development of animation, with in-depth studies of studios such as Disney, Warner Bros., and Fleischer Studios. Through interviews with key figures in the industry, Barrier has contributed significantly to the documentation and analysis of animation history.

== Life and career ==
Barrier was the founder and editor of Funnyworld (October 1966 – Spring 1983), the first magazine exclusively devoted to comics and animation. It began as a contribution to the CAPA-Alpha amateur press association. Beginning in 1970 it expanded to being a magazine of general circulation that eventually had a print run of several thousand before ceasing publication in the early 1980s.

Barrier was also an early champion of the work of comic book artist Carl Barks and serialized a bibliography of Barks' work in Funnyworld as in 1968 he contributed an essay analyzing Barks' work to the seventh issue of the Don and Maggie Thompsons' fanzine Comic Art. The essay and bibliography installments were the genesis for Barrier's 1982 book Carl Barks and the Art of the Comic Book.

In 1973, Barrier signed a contract with Oxford University Press to write a history of Hollywood animation. The research and writing of that book extended over twenty-four years. With the aid of associate (and animator) Milt Gray, Barrier undertook research and interviews of all the key figures who played a role in the creation of classic American theatrical animation, mainly that of Disney (Silly Symphonies and Mickey Mouse), Warner Bros. (Looney Tunes and Merrie Melodies), MGM (Tom and Jerry) and the Fleischer/Famous studios (Popeye the Sailor). That research provided the basis of his 700-page history of classic animation, Hollywood Cartoons: American Animation in Its Golden Age (published in hardcover in 1999 and reissued and revised as a trade paperback in October 2003).

With writer Martin Williams, Barrier co-edited A Smithsonian Book of Comic-Book Comics (1982).

=== Other works ===
In 2003–2007, Barrier provided several audio commentaries for the first five Looney Tunes Golden Collection DVD box sets, his largest audio contributions being for the first volume. He has also appeared in documentaries about animation.

In 2004, Barrier engaged in a lengthy discussion on animation topics with John Kricfalusi that he was allowed to post on his website.

Barrier's next book was a 2007 biography of Walt Disney, The Animated Man: A Life of Walt Disney. A review of the book by Jeff Ayers described it as "More of a critical slam of Disney's cartoons and films than a useful biography, this book will disappoint, bore, or anger fans of the man." Disney historian Wade Sampson, in a contrary view, stated "If you are a fan of Walt Disney and want information that you know you can trust, then I definitely recommend you add this book to your collection."

In 2014, Barrier published Funnybooks: The Improbable Glories of the Best American Comic Books, a history of Dell comic books of the 1940s and 1950s and artists such as Carl Barks (Donald Duck, Uncle Scrooge), Walt Kelly (Pogo) and John Stanley (Little Lulu).
