= Chuck Jones =

American animator (1912–2002)

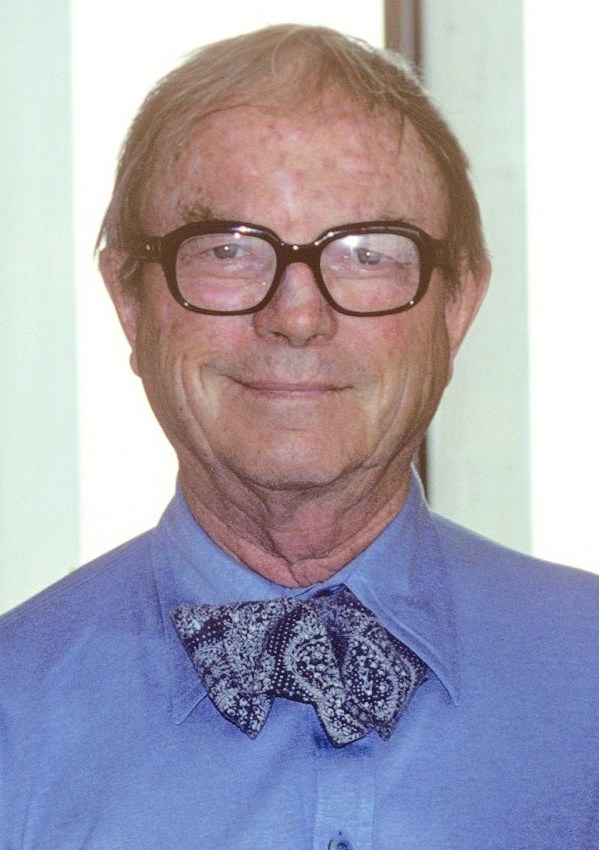
- Jones in 1978
- Born: Charles Martin Jones; September 21, 1912; Spokane, Washington, U.S.
- Died: February 22, 2002 (aged 89); Newport Beach, California, U.S.
- Education: Chouinard Art Institute
- Occupations: Animator; filmmaker; painter; voice actor
- Years active: 1931–2001
- Employers: Animated Pictures (1931–1933); Universal Pictures (1933); Screen Gems (1933); Leon Schlesinger Productions/Warner Bros. Cartoons (1933–1962); Walt Disney Productions (1953); Sib Tower 12 Productions/MGM Animation/Visual Arts (1962–1970); Chuck Jones Productions (1970–1997)
- Notable work: Looney Tunes; Merrie Melodies; Tom and Jerry; How the Grinch Stole Christmas!
- Spouses: Dorothy Webster (m. 1935; died 1978); Marian Dern (m. 1981)
- Children: 1
- Website: chuckjones.com

Charles Martin Jones (September 21, 1912 – February 22, 2002), known professionally as Chuck Jones, was an American animator, filmmaker, painter, and voice actor, best known for his work with Warner Bros. Cartoons on the Looney Tunes and Merrie Melodies series of shorts. He wrote, produced, and/or directed many classic animated cartoon shorts starring Bugs Bunny, Daffy Duck, Wile E. Coyote and the Road Runner, Pepé Le Pew, Marvin the Martian, and Porky Pig, among others.

Jones started his career at Leon Schlesinger Productions in 1933, animating for director Tex Avery and his co-worker Bob Clampett, before receiving his own directorial unit after Frank Tashlin's departure. Initially known for his Disney-esque cartoons focusing on story and characters, he slowly developed a wry and fast-paced sense of humor that defined the series' most notable cartoons and gained prominence at the studio. During World War II, Jones directed many of the Private Snafu (1943–1946) shorts which were shown to members of the United States military.

After his career at Warner Bros. ended in 1962, Jones started Sib Tower 12 Productions and began producing cartoons for Metro-Goldwyn-Mayer, including a new series of Tom and Jerry shorts (1963–1967) as well as the television adaptations of Dr. Seuss's How the Grinch Stole Christmas! (1966) and Horton Hears a Who! (1970). He later started his own studio, Chuck Jones Enterprises, where he directed and produced the film adaptation of Norton Juster's The Phantom Tollbooth (1970).

Jones's work along with the other animators was showcased in the documentary Bugs Bunny: Superstar (1975). Jones directed the first feature-length animated Looney Tunes compilation film, The Bugs Bunny/Road Runner Movie (1979). In 1990 he wrote his memoir, Chuck Amuck: The Life and Times of an Animated Cartoonist, which was made into a documentary film, Chuck Amuck (1991). He was also profiled in the American Masters documentary Chuck Jones: Extremes & Inbetweens – A Life in Animation (2000) which aired on PBS.

Two Warner Brothers cartoons that Jones directed, For Scent-imental Reasons and So Much for So Little, won Academy Awards for Best Animated Short Film, though at this time it was customary for the statuette to be given to a cartoon's producer, not the director. Jones did not receive a Best Animated Short Film Oscar of his own until winning for The Dot and the Line in 1966. Robin Williams later presented Jones with an Honorary Academy Award in 1996 for his work in the animation industry.

Film historian Leonard Maltin has praised Jones's work at Warner Bros., MGM and Chuck Jones Enterprises. In Jerry Beck's 1994 book The 50 Greatest Cartoons, a group of animation professionals ranked What's Opera, Doc? (1957) as the greatest cartoon of all time, with ten of the entries being directed by Jones including Duck Amuck (1953), Duck Dodgers in the 24½th Century (1953), One Froggy Evening (1955), Rabbit of Seville (1950), and Rabbit Seasoning (1952).

== Early life ==
Charles Martin Jones was born on September 21, 1912, in Spokane, Washington, to Mabel McQuiddy (née Martin) and Charles Adams Jones. When he was six months old, he moved with his parents and three siblings to Los Angeles, California.

In his autobiography, Chuck Amuck, Jones credits his artistic bent to circumstances surrounding his father, who was an unsuccessful businessman in California in the 1920s. He recounted that his father would start every new business venture by purchasing new stationery and new pencils with the company name on them. When the business failed, his father would quietly turn the huge stacks of useless stationery and pencils over to his children, requiring them to use up all the material as fast as possible. The children drew frequently, owing to the abundance of high-quality paper and pencils. Later, in one art school class, the professor gravely informed the students that they each had 100,000 bad drawings in them that they must first get past before they could possibly draw anything worthwhile. Jones recounted years later that this pronouncement came as a great relief to him, as he was well past the 200,000 mark, having used up all that stationery. Jones and several of his siblings went on to artistic careers.

During his artistic education, he worked part-time as a janitor. After graduating from Chouinard Art Institute, Jones got a phone call from a friend named Fred Kopietz, who had been hired by Ub Iwerks' studio Animated Pictures, and offered him a job. He worked his way up in the animation industry, starting as a cel washer; "then I moved up to become a painter in black and white, some color. Then I went on to take animator's drawings and traced them onto the celluloid. Then I became what they call an in-betweener, which is the guy that does the drawing between the drawings the animator makes". While at Iwerks, he met a cel painter named Dorothy Webster, who later became his first wife.

== Career ==
=== Warner Bros. Cartoons ===
Jones joined Leon Schlesinger Productions, the independent studio that produced Looney Tunes and Merrie Melodies for Warner Bros. Pictures, in 1933 as an assistant animator. In 1935 he was promoted to animator and assigned to work with a new Schlesinger director, Tex Avery. There was no room for the new Avery unit in Leon Schlesinger's small studio, so Avery, Jones, and fellow animators Bob Clampett, Virgil Ross, and Sid Sutherland were moved into a small adjacent building they dubbed "Termite Terrace". In 1937, Jones' old boss Ub Iwerks was subcontracted to produce several Looney Tunes shorts for Schlesinger, with Clampett and Jones brought in to assist him. Iwerks completed only two shorts before he left, with Clampett taking his position soon after. Jones worked alongside Clampett as an animator and an uncredited co-director (or "supervisor", the original title for an animation director in the studio) before becoming a main director himself in 1938 when Frank Tashlin left the studio, a position that was initially offered to animator Robert McKimson. The following year, Jones created his first major character, Sniffles, a cute Disney-style mouse, who went on to star in twelve Warner Bros. cartoons.

Jones initially struggled in with his directorial style in his formative years. Unlike the other directors in the studio, Jones wanted to make cartoons that would rival the quality and tone to that of ones made by Walt Disney Productions. However, his cartoons suffered from sluggish pacing and a lack of any humor, with Jones himself later describing his early conception of timing and dialog to have been "formed by watching the action in the La Brea Tar Pits". Schlesinger and the studio heads were unsatisfied with his Disney-esque style and demanded him make cartoons that were funnier. Jones began to change his directorial style starting with the 1942 short The Draft Horse, but the cartoon that was generally considered his true turning point was The Dover Boys at Pimento University later that year. The short became highly regarded in recent years for its quick-timed gags and extensive use of stylized animation. Despite this, Schlesinger and the studios heads were still dissatisfied and begun the process to fire him, but because they were unable to find a replacement due to a labor shortage stemming from World War II, Jones kept his position.

Jones was actively involved in efforts to unionize the staff of Leon Schlesinger Productions. He was responsible for recruiting animators, layout men, and background people. Almost all animators joined, in reaction to salary cuts imposed by Schlesinger. The Metro-Goldwyn-Mayer cartoon studio had already signed a union contract, encouraging their counterparts under Schlesinger. In a meeting with his staff, Schlesinger talked for a few minutes, then turned over the meeting to his attorney. His insulting manner had a unifying effect on the staff. Jones gave a pep talk at the union headquarters. As negotiations broke down, the staff decided to go on strike. Schlesinger locked them out of the studio for a few days, before agreeing to sign the contract. A Labor-Management Committee was formed and Jones served as a moderator. Because of his role as a supervisor in the studio, he could not himself join the union.

Outpost, a Private Snafu cartoon directed by Chuck Jones in 1944

During World War II, Jones worked closely with Theodor Geisel, better known as Dr. Seuss, to create the Private Snafu series of Army educational cartoons (the character was created by director Frank Capra). Jones later collaborated with Seuss on animated adaptations of Seuss' books, including How the Grinch Stole Christmas! in 1966. Jones directed such shorts as The Weakly Reporter, a 1944 short that related to shortages and rationing on the home front. During the same year, he directed UPA's second short subject Hell-Bent for Election, a propaganda campaign film for Franklin D. Roosevelt.

Jones created characters through the late 1930s, late 1940s, and the 1950s, which include his collaborative help in co-developing Bugs Bunny and also included creating Claude Cat, Marc Antony and Pussyfoot, Charlie Dog, Michigan J. Frog, Gossamer, and his four most popular creations, Marvin the Martian, Pepé Le Pew, Wile E. Coyote and the Road Runner. Jones and writer Michael Maltese collaborated on the Road Runner cartoons, Duck Amuck, One Froggy Evening, and What's Opera, Doc?. Other staff at Unit A with whom Jones collaborated include layout artist, background designer, and co-director Maurice Noble; animator and co-director Abe Levitow; and animators Ken Harris and Ben Washam.

Jones remained at Warner Bros. throughout the 1950s, except for a brief period in 1953 when Warner closed the animation studio. During this interim, Jones found employment at Walt Disney Productions, where he teamed with Ward Kimball for four months. According to Kimball, Jones expected to work at Disney at a higher salary then at Warner Bros., but was instead employed at the same salary despite numerous negotiations with Walt Disney. Furthermore, Jones was not given directorial assignments but was instead assigned to assist Kimball on Sleeping Beauty (1959), which at the time was experiencing production delays.

Upon Warner Bros. Cartoons reopening, Jones was rehired and reunited with most of his unit. Despite the unsatisfying tenure, Jones still held the Disney studio in high regard, but later joked that the only job worth having at Disney belonged to Walt.

In the early 1960s, Jones and his wife Dorothy wrote the screenplay for the animated feature Gay Purr-ee. The finished film included the voices of Judy Garland, Robert Goulet, and Red Buttons as cats in Paris. The feature was produced by UPA and directed by Jones' former Warner Bros. collaborator, Abe Levitow. Jones was moonlighting to work on the film as he had an exclusive contract with Warner Bros. UPA completed the film and made it available for distribution in 1962, whereupon it was picked up by Warner Bros. When Warner Bros. discovered that Jones had violated his exclusive contract with them, they fired him. Jones's former animation unit was laid off after completing the final cartoon in their pipeline, The Iceman Ducketh, and the rest of the Warner Bros. Cartoons studio was closed in 1963.

=== MGM Animation/Visual Arts ===
With business partner Les Goldman, Jones started an independent animation studio, Tower 12, Inc. (later Sib Tower 12 Productions after Walter Bien's SIB Productions took over), and brought on most of his unit from Warner Bros., including Maurice Noble and Michael Maltese. In 1963, Metro-Goldwyn-Mayer contracted with Sib Tower 12 to have Jones and his staff produce new Tom and Jerry cartoons as well as a television adaptation of all Tom and Jerry theatricals produced to that date. This included major editing, including writing out the African-American maid, Mammy Two-Shoes, and replacing her with one of Irish descent voiced by June Foray. In 1964, Sib Tower 12 was absorbed by MGM and was renamed MGM Animation/Visual Arts. His animated short film, The Dot and the Line: A Romance in Lower Mathematics, won the 1965 Academy Award for Best Animated Short Film. Jones directed the classic animated short The Bear That Wasn't.

In 1966, he produced and directed the TV special How the Grinch Stole Christmas!, featuring narration by Boris Karloff.

Jones continued to work on other TV specials such as Horton Hears a Who! (1970), but his main focus during this time was producing the feature film The Phantom Tollbooth, which did lukewarm business when MGM released it in 1970. Jones co-directed 1969's The Pogo Special Birthday Special, based on the Walt Kelly comic strip, and voiced the characters of Porky Pine and Bun Rab. It was at this point that he decided to start ST Incorporated.

=== Chuck Jones Enterprises ===
MGM closed the animation division in 1970, and Jones once again started his own studio, Chuck Jones Enterprises. He produced a Saturday morning children's TV series for the American Broadcasting Company called Curiosity Shop in 1971. In 1973, he produced an animated version of the George Selden book The Cricket in Times Square and subsequently produced two sequels.

Three of his works during this period were animated TV adaptations of short stories from Rudyard Kipling's The Jungle Book: Mowgli's Brothers, The White Seal and Rikki-Tikki-Tavi. During this period, Jones began to experiment with more realistically designed characters, most of which had larger eyes, leaner bodies, and altered proportions, such as those of the Looney Tunes characters.

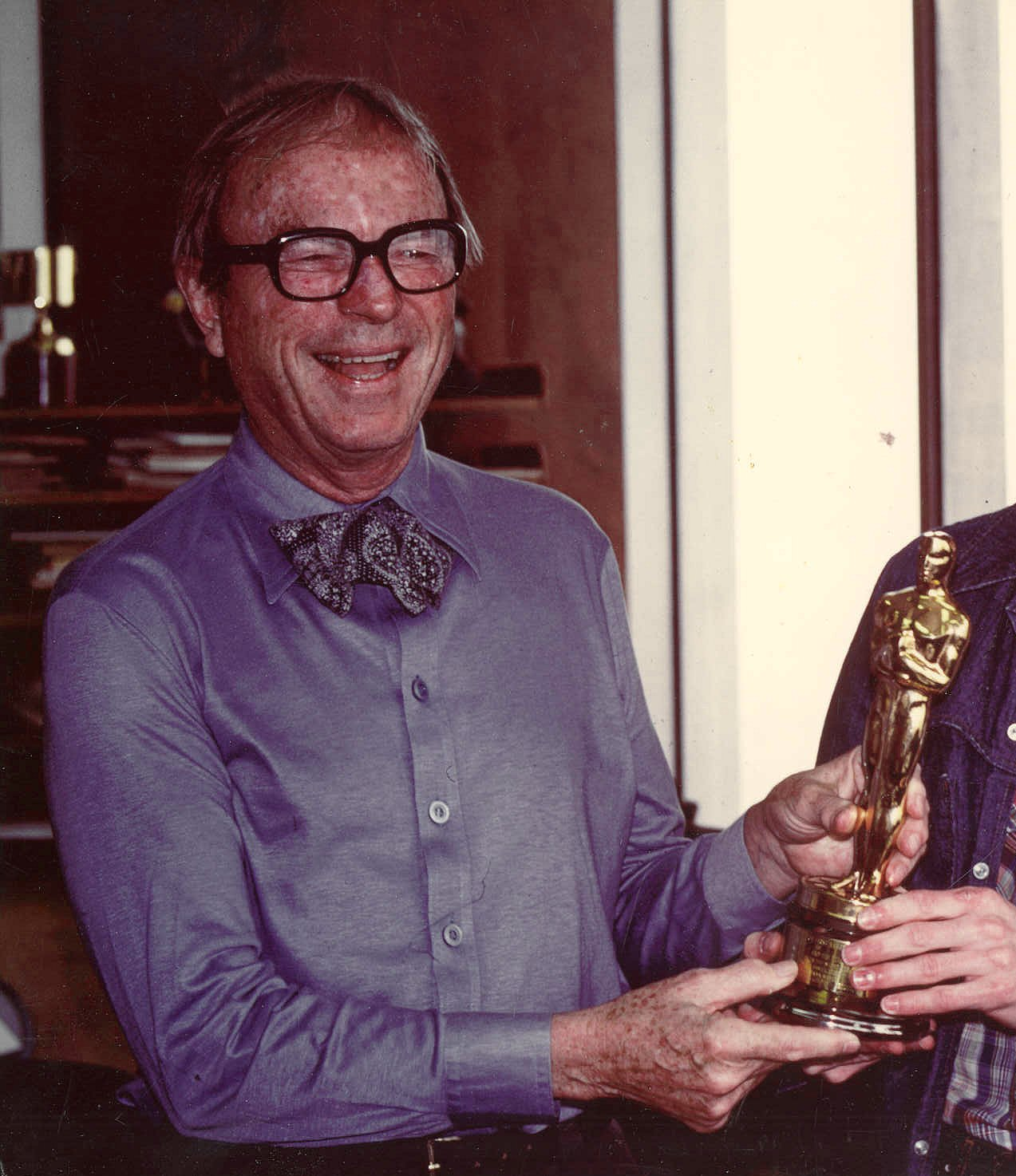
Jones in 1978

=== Return to Warner Bros. ===
Jones resumed working with Warner Bros. in 1976 with the animated TV adaptation of The Carnival of the Animals with Bugs Bunny and Daffy Duck. Jones also produced The Bugs Bunny/Road Runner Movie (1979), which was a compilation of Jones's best theatrical shorts, new Road Runner shorts for The Electric Company series and Bugs Bunny's Looney Christmas Tales (1979). New shorts were made for Bugs Bunny's Bustin' Out All Over (1980).

From 1977 to 1978, Jones wrote and drew the newspaper comic strip Crawford (also known as Crawford & Morgan) for the Chicago Tribune-NY News Syndicate. In 2011 IDW Publishing collected Jones's strip as part of their Library of American Comic Strips.

=== Jones–Avery letter ===
On December 11, 1975, a week before the release of Bugs Bunny: Superstar, which prominently featured Bob Clampett, Jones wrote a letter to Tex Avery, accusing Clampett of taking credit for ideas that were not his, and for characters created by other directors (notably Jones's Sniffles and Friz Freleng's Yosemite Sam). Their correspondence was never published in the media. It was forwarded to Michael Barrier, who had conducted the interview with Clampett, and over the years Jones distributed it to multiple people concerned with animation.

== Influences ==
When he was a kid, Jones loved to read any fiction and non-fiction authors such as Charles Dickens and Rudyard Kipling, his favorite being Mark Twain. He also liked cinema, mainly admiring the works of Laurel & Hardy, Charlie Chaplin, Buster Keaton and The Marx Brothers. His main graphic influence was Winsor McCay, and he later cited Walt Disney and Tex Avery, as well as comic artist Ronald Searle.

== Personal life ==
In 1978, Jones's wife Dorothy died. He married Marian Dern, the writer of the comic strip Rick O'Shay, in 1981.

== Later life ==
Through the 1980s and 1990s, Jones was painting cartoon and parody art, sold through animation galleries by his daughter's company, Linda Jones Enterprises. Jones was the creative consultant and character designer for two Raggedy Ann animated specials and the first Alvin and the Chipmunks Christmas special A Chipmunk Christmas. He made a cameo appearance in the film Gremlins (1984) and he wrote and directed the Bugs Bunny/Daffy Duck animated sequences that bookend its sequel Gremlins 2: The New Batch (1990). Jones directed animated sequences for various features such as a lengthy sequence in the film Stay Tuned (1992) and a shorter one seen at the start of the Robin Williams vehicle Mrs. Doubtfire (1993). Also during the 1980s and 1990s, Jones served on the advisory board of the National Student Film Institute. In 1993, he started Chuck Jones Film Productions with a contract at Warner Bros. to produce new animated Looney Tunes shorts for theatrical release. The venture was later dissolved in 1996.

Jones's final Looney Tunes cartoon was Father of the Bird (1997), which starred Sylvester. Jones's final animation project was a series of 13 shorts starring a timber wolf character he had designed in the 1960s named Thomas Timber Wolf. The series was released online by Warner Bros. in 2000. From 2001 until 2004, Cartoon Network aired The Chuck Jones Show which features shorts directed by him. The show won the Annie Award for Outstanding Achievement in an Animated Special Project.

In 1997, Jones was awarded the Edward MacDowell Medal.

In 1999, he founded the non-profit Chuck Jones Center for Creativity, in Costa Mesa, California, an art education "gymnasium for the brain" dedicated to teaching creative skills, primarily to children and seniors, which is still in operation.

In his later years, he recovered from skin cancer and received hip and ankle replacements.

== Death ==
Jones died of congestive heart failure on February 22, 2002, at his home in Corona del Mar, Newport Beach at the age of 89. He was cremated and his ashes were scattered at sea. After his death, Cartoon Network aired a 20-second segment tracing Jones's portrait with the words "We'll miss you". Also, the Looney Tunes cartoon Daffy Duck for President, based on the book that Jones had written and using Jones's style for the characters, originally scheduled to be released in 2000, was released in 2004 as part of disc three of the Looney Tunes Golden Collection: Volume 2 DVD set.

== Legacy ==
So Much for So Little, the 1949 Academy Award-winning short directed by Jones

=== Academy Awards ===
Year	Award	Work	Result	Ref.
1949	Best Animated Short Film	Mouse Wreckers	Nominated	
1950	Best Documentary Short Film	So Much for So Little	Won	
1950	Best Animated Short Film	For Scent-imental Reasons	Won	
1954	Best Animated Short Film	From A to Z-Z-Z-Z	Nominated	
1960	Best Animated Short Film	High Note	Nominated	
1962	Best Animated Short Film	Beep Prepared	Nominated	
1962	Best Animated Short Film	Nelly's Folly	Nominated	
1963	Best Animated Short Film	Now Hear This	Nominated	
1966	Best Animated Short Film	The Dot and the Line	Won	
1996	Honorary Academy Award	Lifetime Achievement	Won	

Jones received an Honorary Academy Award in 1996 by the board of governors of the Academy of Motion Picture Arts and Sciences, for "the creation of classic cartoons and cartoon characters whose animated lives have brought joy to our real ones for more than half a century." At that year's awards show, Robin Williams, a self-confessed "Jones-aholic", presented the honorary award to Jones, calling him "The Orson Welles of animation", and the audience gave Jones a standing ovation as he walked onto the stage. For himself, a flattered Jones wryly remarked in his acceptance speech, "Well, what can I say in the face of such humiliating evidence? I stand guilty before the world of directing over three hundred cartoons in the last fifty or sixty years. Hopefully, this means you've forgiven me." He received the Lifetime Achievement Award at the World Festival of Animated Film – Animafest Zagreb in 1988.

=== Honors ===
Jones was a historical authority as well as a major contributor to the development of animation throughout the 20th century. In 1990, Jones received the Golden Plate Award of the American Academy of Achievement. He received an honorary degree from Oglethorpe University in 1993. For his contribution to the motion picture industry, Jones has a star on the Hollywood Walk of Fame at 7011 Hollywood Blvd. He was awarded the Inkpot Award in 1974. In 1996, Jones received an Honorary Oscar at the 68th Academy Awards.

Three short films directed by Jones have been inducted into the National Film Registry by the United States Film Preservation Board: What's Opera, Doc?, inducted in 1992; Duck Amuck, inducted in 1999; and One Froggy Evening, inducted in 2003.

=== Art exhibit ===
Jones's life and legacy were celebrated on January 12, 2012, with the official grand opening of The Chuck Jones Experience at Circus Circus Las Vegas.

== Publications ==
- Chuck Jones; Steven Spielberg (February 19, 1990). Chuck Amuck: The Life and Times of an Animated Cartoonist. Simon & Schuster Ltd. ISBN 978-0671710248.
- Jones, Chuck (1996). Chuck Reducks: Drawing from the Fun Side of Life. New York: Warner Books. ISBN 0-446-51893-X.
- Chuck Jones (July 1997). Daffy Duck for President. Warner Bros. ISBN 978-1890371005.
- Stefan Kanfer; Chuck Jones (May 1, 2000). Serious Business: The Art and Commerce of Animation in America from Betty Boop to Toy Story. Da Capo. ISBN 978-0306809187.
- Chuck Jones (December 27, 2011). Chuck Jones: The Dream that Never Was. IDW Publishing & The Library of American Comics. ISBN 978-1613770306.

== See also ==
- Warner Bros. Cartoons
- Warner Bros. Animation
- Chuck Jones Productions/Enterprises

== Sources ==
- Sigall, Martha (2005). "The Boys of Termite Terrace". Living Life Inside the Lines: Tales from the Golden Age of Animation. University Press of Mississippi. ISBN 9781578067497.
- Barrier, J. Michael (1999). Hollywood Cartoons: American Animation in Its Golden Age. New York: Oxford University Press. ISBN 978-0-19-503759-3.
