= Maurice Noble =

American animation production designer (1911–2001)

- Born: Maurice James Noble; May 1, 1911; Spooner Township, Minnesota, U.S.
- Died: May 18, 2001 (aged 90); La Crescenta, California, U.S.
- Education: Chouinard Art Institute
- Occupations: Animated filmmaker and cartoonist
- Years active: 1934–2001
- Employer(s): Walt Disney Productions (1934-1941); Warner Bros. Cartoons (1943-1945, 1950-1963); MGM Animation/Visual Arts (1963-1970)

Maurice James Noble (May 1, 1911 – May 18, 2001) was an American animation production designer, background artist and layout designer whose contributions to the industry spanned more than 60 years. He was a long-time associate and right-hand man of animation director Chuck Jones, especially at Warner Bros. Cartoons in the 1950s and early 1960s, during which he served as Jones' layout artist and eventual co-director. His work contributed to such cartoon classics as Duck Dodgers in the 24½th Century, What's Opera, Doc? and the Road Runner series.

== Early life and Disney years ==
Maurice Noble was born in Spooner Township, Minnesota. He spent much of his childhood in New Mexico and Southern California. In the early 1930s, he attended the Chouinard Art Institute in Los Angeles, and while there the Institute displayed his works in its first one-man show of watercolors. Having to leave Chouinard for financial reasons, he ended up doing design work for a department store.

A Disney scout recruited him around 1934, and he decided to accept the job since it paid $10 per month more than the department store did. Noble was put to work on backgrounds for the Silly Symphonies cartoon series. At that time the Disney backgrounds were required to be done in transparent watercolor wash, which was technically difficult because correcting a mistake was usually impossible, requiring a full new attempt.

Snow White and the Seven Dwarfs was the first feature-length film Noble worked on. This was followed by background work on other Disney features, notably the Rite of Spring sequence in Fantasia. Noble also did story development for the "Dance of the Hours" in that film. For Dumbo, he did color coordination and character design, including work on the pink elephant sequence.

Noble joined the Disney animators' strike in 1941; it lasted five weeks and became bitter. When he returned after the strike was settled, his office was moved to an ex-broomcloset and he was left without assignments. Soon he was laid off and his career at Disney was at an end.

The outbreak of World War II led Noble to enlist in the Army Signal Corps. He was eventually assigned to a small unit headed by Ted Geisel (better known as Dr. Seuss). The unit was based at the Fox studios and under Col. Frank Capra. It worked on posters and booklets, and on a cartoon series called Private Snafu. The unit did the writing, storyboards, and background designs; the cartoon production was contracted out. Warner Bros. won the contract for Private Snafu, and the WB animation director Chuck Jones worked on the series. Following the war Noble did freelance work in the industry and then took a position doing art for a filmstrip production company in St. Louis.

== The Warner Bros. years ==
Noble remained in St. Louis until 1950, when he was invited to come to Warner Bros. Cartoons to do cartoon layout for Chuck Jones' group, beginning with the short Rabbit Seasoning. This was the first time he had done layout, which consists of designing the background environment and, for each shot, the particular viewpoint. The layout drawings and colorations are then used by the background artist (often Philip DeGuard) to paint the final backgrounds (see Chuck Amuck, p. 148 for an example).

At Warner Bros. Cartoons, Noble worked with Jones for a decade, over which time the team did over 60 cartoons. Turning away from the realism of Disney backgrounds, Noble grew into styles using shape and color to define the space. The graphic look of his backgrounds could vary widely from film to film; he tried to make the backdrop fit the mood of the film. Noble says:

I call it stepping into the picture. You look around and say, 'Gee, what's this all about, and does it feel right for this given picture?' And then you go ahead and design from that standpoint.

The Jones unit worked with many of Warners characters: Bugs Bunny, Daffy Duck, Road Runner & Coyote. Noble's wide-open desert landscapes gave the Road Runner cartoons their characteristic spaciousness. The cartoons Noble designed at Warners include What's Opera, Doc? (1957), a Bugs Bunny parody of Wagner's Ring Cycle that has been inducted into the National Film Registry. Noble's futuristic settings enhance Duck Dodgers in the 24½th Century (1953). Other cartoons included the Academy Award nominees From A to Z-Z-Z-Z (1954), High Note (1960), Beep Prepared (1961), Nelly's Folly (1961), and Now Hear This (1962).

A break of about a year came during this period, when Noble spent time working on industrial films for John Sutherland's studio in the wake of Warner Bros. Pictures shutting down their cartoon unit, and did not return immediately upon the studio re-opening. In this period, Jones had his layouts created first by former Disney artist Ernie Nordli, who used an even more abstract (albeit less consistent) style than Noble, and then later by Noble's predecessor, Robert Gribbroek, who largely discarded the styles used by Noble and Nordli, and reverted to the look of Jones' earlier cartoons. Eventually, Jones coaxed Noble into returning to Warner Bros. Cartoons, and the two men would work together for the next few decades.

In the early 1960s, Noble started receiving co-director credit on a number of the Jones-unit productions. This reflected his increased involvement in many phases of the creation process beyond just the layouts, pulling things together and ironing out rough spots.

== MGM and Dr. Seuss ==
In 1963, after Chuck Jones was let go by Warner Bros. Pictures, Noble left Warners and joined Jones at Tower 12 Productions (also called Sib-Tower 12). This new company had a contract with MGM, and eventually became the animation unit of MGM.

The bread-and-butter work for the first couple of years was producing cartoons starring MGM's Tom and Jerry characters, but there were an assortment of other projects. One was The Incredible Mr. Limpet (1964), a combined live-action and animation feature. Noble co-directed The Dot and the Line (1965) which won the Oscar for short subject (cartoon). He also designed the 1970 feature The Phantom Tollbooth.

Noble started working again with Ted Geisel for the first time since the war, responsible for the designs used in the TV feature How the Grinch Stole Christmas! (1966). He later did design and layout work on a number of other Dr. Seuss features, first at MGM (Horton Hears a Who! (1970)), and then at the DePatie–Freleng studios (e.g. The Cat in the Hat (1971), The Lorax (1972), Dr. Seuss on the Loose (1973)).

== Later years ==
In the late 1970s and most of the 1980s, Noble largely withdrew from work in the animation industry to pursue other interests. These included producing fine art, particularly hand-pulled silkscreen prints. In 1987, he received a lifetime achievement Annie Award (from the International Animation Society) for his contributions over the previous 50 years.

In 1989, Noble did development work on Steven Spielberg's Tiny Toon Adventures, and did writing and design for the "Duck Dodgers Jr." in an episode of "The Return of the Acme Acres Zone" (1990).

In the mid-1990s, Noble rejoined Jones at Chuck Jones Film Productions, serving as art director on Chariots of Fur (1994) and color consultant on several other productions, including Pullet Surprise.

While at the Jones studio, Noble began supervising, training, and mentoring young artists just out of (or still in) school. These artists came to be known as the 'Noble boys and girls'. Many of them became involved in "Noble Tales," a planned series of animated shorts based on folk tales. One such film was Al Tudi Tuhak (1999). He continued to be active in a variety of animation projects, including consultation with Disney artists for their first watercolor backgrounds in half a century, for Lilo & Stitch.

Noble died on May 18, 2001, at his home in La Crescenta, California, 17 days after his 90th birthday.

== Selected filmography ==
- The Old Mill (1937) (background artist) - Oscar nominee
- Snow White and the Seven Dwarfs (1937) (background artist)
- Pinocchio (1940) (development)
- Fantasia (1940) (development)
- Dumbo (1941) (character designs)
- Bambi (1942) (development)
- Rabbit Seasoning (1952) (layout artist)
- Duck Amuck (1953) (layout artist) - U.S. National Film Registry selection
- Duck Dodgers in the 24½th Century (1953) (layout artist)
- From A to Z-Z-Z-Z (1954) (layout artist)
- Sheep Ahoy (1954) (layout artist)
- Two Scent's Worth (1955) (layout artist)
- Ali Baba Bunny (1957) (layout artist)
- What's Opera, Doc? (1957) (layout artist) - U.S. National Film Registry selection
- Robin Hood Daffy (1958) (layout artist)
- Hare-Way to the Stars (1958) (layout artist)
- Gateways to the Mind (1958) (animation designer)
- Hopalong Casualty (1960) (layout artist)
- High Note (1960) (layout artist) - Oscar nominee
- Beep Prepared (1961) (co-director) - Oscar nominee
- A Sheep in the Deep (1962) (co-director)
- Martian Through Georgia (1962) (co-director)
- Now Hear This (1963) (co-director) - Oscar nominee
- Transylvania 6-5000 (1963) (co-director)
- The Iceman Ducketh (1964) (co-director)
- War and Pieces (1964) (co-director)
- The Incredible Mr. Limpet (1964) (production designer)
- The Dot and the Line (1965) (co-director) - Oscar winner
- How the Grinch Stole Christmas! (1966) (production designer)
- The Bear That Wasn't (1967) (co-director)
- Horton Hears a Who! (1970) (art director)
- The Phantom Tollbooth (1970) (production designer)
- The Cat in the Hat (1971) (art director)
- The Lorax (1972) (art director)
- Dr. Seuss on the Loose (1973) (art director)
- Tiny Toon Adventures (1990) (development, writer)
- Chariots of Fur (1994) (art director)
- Pullet Surprise (1997) (color consultant)
- Al Tudi Tuhak (1999) (narrator)
- Timber Wolf (2001) (co-art director)
- The Pumpkin of Nyefar (2004) (co-writer)

== Legacy ==
- Several days after his death, Cartoon Network produced a memorial bumper that showed a brief clip of his recent television interview, his contribution to animation, and showing the memorable final scene of What's Opera, Doc?
