= Chuck Jones filmography =

American animator filmography

Chuck Jones was an American animator who worked on various animated short films.

== Warner Bros. Cartoons ==
=== Looney Tunes/Merrie Melodies ===
==== Theatrical shorts (1937–1964) ====
- Porky's Badtime Story (1937) (animator)
- Get Rich Quick Porky (1937) (animator, layout artist)
- Porky's Party (1938) (animator, layout artist)
- The Night Watchman (1938) (director)
- Dog Gone Modern (1939) (director)
- Robin Hood Makes Good (1939) (director)
- Prest-O Change-O (1939) (director)
- Daffy Duck and the Dinosaur (1939) (director)
- Naughty but Mice (1939) (director)
- Old Glory (1939) (director)
- Snowman's Land (1939) (director)
- Little Brother Rat (1939) (director)
- Little Lion Hunter (1939) (director)
- The Good Egg (1939) (director)
- Sniffles and the Bookworm (1939) (director)
- The Curious Puppy (1939) (director)
- Mighty Hunters (1940) (director)
- Elmer's Candid Camera (1940) (director)
- Sniffles Takes a Trip (1940) (director)
- Tom Thumb in Trouble (1940) (director)
- The Egg Collector (1940) (director)
- Ghost Wanted (1940) (director)
- Stage Fright (1940) (director)
- Good Night Elmer (1940) (director)
- Bedtime for Sniffles (1940) (director)
- Elmer's Pet Rabbit (1941) (director)
- Sniffles Bells the Cat (1941) (director)
- Joe Glow, the Firefly (1941) (director)
- Porky's Ant (1941) (director)
- Toy Trouble (1941) (director)
- Porky's Prize Pony (1941) (director)
- Inki and the Lion (1941) (director)
- Snow Time for Comedy (1941) (director)
- The Brave Little Bat (1941) (director)
- Saddle Silly (1941) (director)
- Porky's Midnight Matinee (1941) (director)
- The Bird Came C. O. D. (1942) (director)
- Porky's Cafe (1942) (director)
- Conrad the Sailor (1942) (director)
- Dog Tired (1942) (director)
- The Draft Horse (1942) (director)
- Hold the Lion, Please (1942) (director)
- The Squawkin' Hawk (1942) (director)
- Fox Pop (1942) (director)
- The Dover Boys at Pimento University (1942) (director)
- My Favorite Duck (1942) (director)
- Case of the Missing Hare (1942) (director)
- To Duck.... or Not to Duck (1943) (director)
- Flop Goes the Weasel (1943) (director)
- Super-Rabbit (1943) (director)
- The Unbearable Bear (1943) (director)
- The Aristo Cat (1943) (director)
- Wackiki Wabbit (1943) (director)
- Fin 'n' Catty (1943) (director)
- Inki and the Minah Bird (1943) (director)
- Tom Turk and Daffy (1944) (director)
- Bugs Bunny and the Three Bears (1944) (director)
- The Weakly Reporter (1944) (director)
- Angel Puss (1944) (director)
- From Hand to Mouse (1944) (director)
- Lost and Foundling (1944) (director)
- Odor-able Kitty (1945) (director)
- Trap Happy Porky (1945) (director)
- Hare Conditioned (1945) (director)
- Fresh Airedale (1945) (director)
- Hare Tonic (1945) (director)
- Quentin Quail (1946) (director)
- Hush My Mouse (1946) (director)
- Hair-Raising Hare (1946) (director)
- The Eager Beaver (1946) (director)
- Fair and Worm-er (1946) (director)
- Roughly Squeaking (1946) (director)
- Scent-imental Over You (1947) (director)
- Inki at the Circus (1947) (director)
- A Pest in the House (1947) (director)
- Little Orphan Airedale (1947) (director)
- House Hunting Mice (1948) (director)
- A Feather in His Hare (1948) (director)
- What's Brewin', Bruin? (1948) (director)
- Rabbit Punch (1948) (director)
- Haredevil Hare (1948) (director)
- You Were Never Duckier (1948) (director)
- Daffy Dilly (1948) (director)
- My Bunny Lies over the Sea (1948) (director)
- Scaredy Cat (1948) (director)
- Awful Orphan (1949) (director)
- Mississippi Hare (1949) (director)
- Mouse Wreckers (1949) (director)
- The Bee-Deviled Bruin (1949) (director)
- Long-Haired Hare (1949) (director)
- Often an Orphan (1949) (director)
- Fast and Furry-ous (1949) (director)
- Frigid Hare (1949) (director)
- For Scent-imental Reasons (1949) (director)
- Bear Feat (1949) (director)
- Rabbit Hood (1949) (director)
- The Scarlet Pumpernickel (1950) (director)
- Homeless Hare (1950) (director)
- The Hypo-Chondri-Cat (1950) (director)
- 8 Ball Bunny (1950) (director)
- Dog Gone South (1950) (director)
- The Ducksters (1950) (director)
- Caveman Inki (1950) (director)
- Rabbit of Seville (1950) (director)
- Two's a Crowd (1950) (director)
- Bunny Hugged (1951) (director)
- Scent-imental Romeo (1951) (director)
- A Hound for Trouble (1951) (director)
- Rabbit Fire (1951) (director)
- Chow Hound (1951) (director)
- The Wearing of the Grin (1951) (director)
- Cheese Chasers (1951) (director)
- A Bear for Punishment (1951) (director)
- Drip-Along Daffy (1951) (director)
- Operation: Rabbit (1952) (director)
- Feed the Kitty (1952) (director)
- Little Beau Pepé (1952) (director)
- Water, Water Every Hare (1952) (director)
- Orange Blossoms for Violet (1952) (director)
- Beep, Beep (1952) (director)
- The Hasty Hare (1952) (director)
- Going! Going! Gosh! (1952) (director)
- Mouse-Warming (1952) (director)
- Rabbit Seasoning (1952) (director)
- Terrier Stricken (1952) (director)
- Don't Give Up the Sheep (1953) (director)
- Forward March Hare (1953) (director)
- Kiss Me Cat (1953) (director)
- Duck Amuck (1953) (director)
- Much Ado About Nutting (1953) (director)
- Wild Over You (1953) (director)
- Duck Dodgers in the 24½th Century (1953) (director)
- Bully for Bugs (1953) (director)
- Zipping Along (1953) (director)
- Lumber Jack-Rabbit (1953) (director)
- Duck! Rabbit, Duck! (1953) (director)
- Punch Trunk (1953) (director)
- Feline Frame-Up (1954) (director)
- No Barking (1954) (director)
- The Cat's Bah (1954) (director)
- Claws for Alarm (1954) (director)
- Bewitched Bunny (1954) (director)
- Stop! Look! And Hasten! (1954) (director)
- From A to Z-Z-Z-Z (1954) (director)
- My Little Duckaroo (1954) (director)
- Sheep Ahoy (1954) (director)
- Baby Buggy Bunny (1954) (director)
- Beanstalk Bunny (1955) (director)
- Ready, Set, Zoom! (1955) (director)
- Past Perfumance (1955) (director)
- Rabbit Rampage (1955) (director)
- Double or Mutton (1955) (director)
- Jumpin' Jupiter (1955) (director)
- Knight-mare Hare (1955) (director)
- Two Scent's Worth (1955) (writer and director)
- Guided Muscle (1955) (director)
- One Froggy Evening (1955) (director)
- A Hitch in Time (1955) (director)
- Bugs' Bonnets (1956) (director)
- Broom-Stick Bunny (1956) (director)
- Rocket Squad (1956) (director)
- Heaven Scent (1956) (writer and director)
- Gee Whiz-z-z-z-z-z-z (1956) (director)
- Barbary Coast Bunny (1956) (director)
- Rocket-bye Baby (1956) (director)
- Deduce, You Say (1956) (director)
- There They Go-Go-Go! (1956) (director)
- To Hare Is Human (1956) (director)
- Scrambled Aches (1957) (director)
- Ali Baba Bunny (1957) (director)
- Go Fly a Kit (1957) (director)
- Boyhood Daze (1957) (director)
- Steal Wool (1957) (director)
- What's Opera, Doc? (1957) (director)
- Zoom and Bored (1957) (director)
- Touché and Go (1957) (director)
- Robin Hood Daffy (1958) (director)
- Hare-Way to the Stars (1958) (director)
- Whoa, Be-Gone! (1958) (director)
- To Itch His Own (1958) (director)
- Hook, Line and Stinker (1958) (director)
- Hip Hip-Hurry! (1958) (director)
- Cat Feud (1958) (director)
- Baton Bunny (1959) (director with Abe Levitow)
- Hot-Rod and Reel! (1959) (director)
- Wild About Hurry (1959) (director)
- Fastest with the Mostest (1960) (director)
- Who Scent You? (1960) (director)
- Rabbit's Feat (1960) (director)
- Ready, Woolen and Able (1960) (director)
- Hopalong Casualty (1960) (writer and director)
- High Note (1960) (director)
- Zip 'N Snort (1961) (writer and director)
- The Mouse on 57th Street (1961) (director)
- The Abominable Snow Rabbit (1961) (director with Maurice Noble)
- Lickety-Splat (1961) (writer, director with Abe Levitow)
- A Scent of the Matterhorn (1961) (writer & director, credited as M. Charl Jones)
- Compressed Hare (1961) (director with Maurice Noble)
- Beep Prepared (1961) (writer with John Dunn, director with Maurice Noble)
- Nelly's Folly (1961) (writer with David Detiege, director with Abe Levitow & Maurice Noble)
- A Sheep in the Deep (1962) (writer, director with Maurice Noble)
- Zoom at the Top (1962) (writer, director with Maurice Noble)
- Louvre Come Back to Me! (1962) (director with Maurice Noble)
- Martian Through Georgia (1962) (writer with Carl Kohler, director with Abe Levitow & Maurice Noble)
- I Was a Teenage Thumb (1963) (writer with John Dunn, director with Maurice Noble)
- Now Hear This (1963) (writer with John Dunn, director with Maurice Noble)
- Woolen Under Where (1963) (writer)
- Hare-Breadth Hurry (1963) (director with Maurice Noble)
- Mad as a Mars Hare (1963) (director with Maurice Noble)
- Transylvania 6-5000 (1963) (director with Maurice Noble)
- To Beep or Not to Beep (1963) (writer with John Dunn, director with Maurice Noble & Tom Ray)
- The Iceman Ducketh (1964) (uncredited director with Phil Monroe & Maurice Noble)
- War and Pieces (1964) (director with Maurice Noble)

==== Feature film ====
- When's Your Birthday? (1937) (animator)

==== Television projects ====
- Gateways of the Mind (1958) (animated sequences directed by Chuck Jones and designed by Maurice Noble)
- The Bugs Bunny Show (1960–62)
- Adventures of the Road Runner (1962) (writer with John Dunn & Michael Maltese, director with Maurice Noble & Tom Ray)
  - This unsuccessful television pilot was later broken up into three theatrical cartoons:
    - To Beep or Not to Beep (released as a theatrical short in 1963)
    - Zip Zip Hooray (Jones not involved)
    - Road Runner a Go-Go (Jones not involved)

==== Internet ====
- Timber Wolf (2001)

=== Work for the U.S. Government ===
- Point Rationing of Foods (1943) (uncredited)
- Coming Snafu (1943) (uncredited)
- Spies (1943) (uncredited)
- The Infantry Blues (1943) (uncredited)
- Private Snafu vs. Malaria Mike (1944) (uncredited)
- A Lecture on Camouflage (1944) (uncredited)
- Gas (1944) (uncredited)
- Outpost (1944) (uncredited)
- Going Home (1944) (uncredited)
- The Good Egg (1945) (uncredited) (not to be confused with the 1939 cartoon of the same title)
- In the Aleutians (1945) (uncredited)
- It's Murder She Says (1945) (uncredited)
- No Buddy Atoll (1945) (uncredited)
- Secrets of the Caribbean (1945) (uncredited)
- So Much for So Little (1949)
- 90 Days Wondering (1956) (Ralph Phillips)
- Drafty, Isn't It? (1957) (Ralph Phillips)

== United Productions of America ==
Industrial short

- Hell-Bent for Election (1944) (produced for United Auto Workers)

Theatrical feature film:

- Gay Purr-ee (1962, in conjunction with UPA). Jones was sacked by Warner Bros Cartoons after they found out about Jones involvement with this film.

== MGM Animation/Visual Arts ==
=== Theatrical shorts ===
==== Tom and Jerry (1963–1967) ====
1963

- Pent-House Mouse (producer, writer with Michael Maltese, director with Maurice Noble)

1964

- The Cat Above and The Mouse Below (producer, writer with Michael Maltese, director with Maurice Noble)
- Is There a Doctor in the Mouse? (producer, writer with Michael Maltese, director with Maurice Noble)
- Much Ado About Mousing (producer, director with Maurice Noble)
- Snowbody Loves Me (producer, writer with Michael Maltese, director with Maurice Noble)
- The Unshrinkable Jerry Mouse (producer, writer with Michael Maltese, director with Maurice Noble)

1965

- Ah, Sweet Mouse-Story of Life (producer, writer with Michael Maltese, director with Maurice Noble)
- Tom-ic Energy (producer, writer with Michael Maltese, director with Maurice Noble)
- Bad Day at Cat Rock (producer & writer, director with Maurice Noble)
- The Brothers Carry-Mouse-Off (producer, writer with Jim Pabian)
- Haunted Mouse (producer, writer with Jim Pabian, director with Maurice Noble)
- I'm Just Wild About Jerry (producer, writer with Michael Maltese, director with Maurice Noble)
- Of Feline Bondage (producer, writer with Don Towsley, director with Maurice Noble)
- The Year of the Mouse (producer, writer with Michael Maltese, director with Maurice Noble)
- The Cat's Me-Ouch! (producer, writer with Michael Maltese, director with Maurice Noble)

1966

- Duel Personality (producer, writer with Michael Maltese, director with Maurice Noble)
- Jerry, Jerry, Quite Contrary (producer & writer, director with Maurice Noble)
- Jerry-Go-Round (producer, uncredited director with Abe Levitow & Maurice Noble, the latter of which was also uncredited)
- Love Me, Love My Mouse (producer, director with Ben Washam)
- Puss 'n' Boats (producer)
- Filet Meow (producer)
- Matinee Mouse (uncredited producer)
- The A-Tom-Inable Snowman (producer)
- Catty-Cornered (producer, uncredited director with Abe Levitow, uncredited writer with John Dunn & Michael Maltese, the latter of which was also uncredited)

1967

- Cat and Dupli-cat (producer, writer with Michael Maltese, director with Maurice Noble)
- O-Solar Meow (producer)
- Guided Mouse-ille (producer)
- Rock 'n' Rodent (producer)
- Cannery Rodent (producer & writer, director with Maurice Noble)
- The Mouse from H.U.N.G.E.R. (producer)
- Surf-Bored Cat (producer)
- Shutter Bugged Cat (uncredited producer)
- Advance and Be Mechanized (producer)
- Purr-Chance to Dream (producer, uncredited director with Ben Washam, uncredited writer with Irv Spector & Michael Maltese, the latter of which was also uncredited)

==== One-shot theatrical shorts ====
- The Dot and the Line (1965) Oscar winner (producer with Les Goldman, director with Maurice Noble)
- The Bear That Wasn't (1967) (co-producer with Frank Tashlin despite Tashlin having no involvement in the film's production, although he did write the book), director with Maurice Noble

=== Feature film ===
- The Phantom Tollbooth (1970) (co-producer with Les Goldman & Abe Levitow, screenplay with Sam Rosen, director with Abe Levitow & Dave Monahan)

=== Television shows ===
- Tom and Jerry (1965) (titles, bumpers, and reanimating offensive content from the following Hanna-Barbera shorts: The Little Orphan, Saturday Evening Puss, The Framed Cat, Dog Trouble, The Truce Hurts, Triplet Trouble, Push-Button Kitty, Nit-Witty Kitty)
- Off to See the Wizard (1967–1968)

=== Television specials ===
- How the Grinch Stole Christmas! (1966) (co-produced with Ted Geisel, director with Ben Washam)
- The Pogo Special Birthday Special (1969) (co-produced with Walt Kelly, director with Ben Washam, voice actor)
- Horton Hears a Who! (1970) (storyboard artist with Bob Ogle, producer with Ted Geisel, director with Ben Washam, voice actor)
- The Cat in the Hat (1971, in conjunction with DePatie–Freleng Enterprises^{1}) (storyboard artist, producer with Ted Geisel)

^{1} Jones left the production of this special before it was finished after a rift with Geisel, DePatie-Freleng completed the special.

== Chuck Jones Productions/Enterprises ==
Chuck Jones Enterprises
- Type: Private
- Founded: 1970; 56 years ago
- Founder: Chuck Jones
- Defunct: 1997; 29 years ago
- Fate: Content production suspended after 1997
- Headquarters: Los Angeles, California, United States
- Key people: Chuck Jones; Maurice Noble; Mike Maltese
- Website: chuckjones.com chuckjones.org

=== Original works ===
==== Theatrical features ====
- Mrs. Doubtfire (1993) (animation opening sequence only, Pudgy & Grunge)

==== Television series ====
- Curiosity Shop (1971–72) (executive producer)

==== Theatrical short films ====
- Man the Polluter (1973) (animation sequence directed by)

==== Television specials ====
Cricket

- The Cricket in Times Square (1973)
- A Very Merry Cricket (1973)
- Yankee Doodle Cricket (1975)

The Jungle Book

- Rikki-Tikki-Tavi (1975)
- The White Seal (1975)
- Mowgli's Brothers (1976)

Raggedy Ann and Andy

- Raggedy Ann and Andy in The Great Santa Claus Caper (1978)
- Raggedy Ann and Andy in The Pumpkin Who Couldn't Smile (1979)

Other

- A Chipmunk Christmas (1981) (character designer and creative consultant, co-produced with Bagdasarian Productions)
- Peter and the Wolf (1995)

=== Looney Tunes/Merrie Melodies ===
==== Theatrical features ====
- The Bugs Bunny/Road Runner Movie (1979) (Original bridge animation only)
- Gremlins 2: The New Batch (1990) (animated opening and end credits, featuring Daffy Duck and Bugs Bunny, co-produced with Warner Bros. Feature Animation)
- Stay Tuned (1992) (Robocat segment of Rooney Tunes, co-produced with Warner Bros. Feature Animation)

==== Theatrical shorts (1994–1997) ====
- Chariots of Fur (1994) (producer with Linda Jones Clough, writer and director)
- Another Froggy Evening (1995) (producer with Linda Jones Clough, writer with Don Arioli, Stephen A. Fossati, and Stan Freberg, director)
- Superior Duck (1996) (producer with Linda Jones Clough, writer and director)
- Father of the Bird (1997) (producer with Linda Jones Clough)
- Pullet Surprise (1997) (producer with Linda Jones Clough)
- From Hare to Eternity (1997) (producer with Linda Jones Clough, director)

==== Television series and specials ====
- The Electric Company (1971) (Wile E. Coyote and Road Runner segments only)
- Bugs and Daffy's Carnival of the Animals (1976) (All-new special featuring Bugs Bunny and Daffy Duck)
- Bugs Bunny in King Arthur's Court (1978) (All-new special featuring Bugs Bunny and Daffy Duck)
- Bugs Bunny's Looney Christmas Tales (1979) (Co-produced by DePatie–Freleng Enterprises)
- Bugs Bunny's Bustin' Out All Over (1980)
- Daffy Duck's Thanks-for-Giving (1980)

== See also ==
- Warner Bros. Cartoons
- Warner Bros. Animation
- MGM Animation/Visual Arts
