= The Bear That Wasn't (film) =

- "You are not a bear; you are a silly man who needs a shave and wears a fur coat."
- Directed by: Chuck Jones; Maurice Noble (co-director)
- Story by: Frank Tashlin (original); Irv Spector (additional)
- Based on: The Bear That Wasn't by Frank Tashlin
- Produced by: Chuck Jones; Frank Tashlin (in-credit only)
- Narrated by: Paul Frees
- Music by: Dean Elliott
- Animation by: Ben Washam; Tom Ray; Phil Roman; Richard Thompson; Don Towsley
- Color process: Metrocolor
- Production company: MGM Animation/Visual Arts
- Distributed by: Metro-Goldwyn-Mayer
- Release date: December 31, 1967
- Running time: 10 minutes 21 seconds
- Language: English

The Bear That Wasn't is a 1967 American animated short film directed by Chuck Jones and based on the children's book The Bear That Wasn't by Frank Tashlin. It is the final cartoon produced and released by Metro-Goldwyn-Mayer via its MGM Animation/Visual Arts division.

== Production ==
The film was directed by Frank Tashlin's former Warner Bros. Cartoons colleague Chuck Jones. It was the final animated short subject made by MGM and its subsidiary, MGM Animation/Visual Arts, and also the second-to-last animated project for MGM (The Phantom Tollbooth would be the last).

While mostly the same as the book, the short features slight differences, such as the elderly president of the factory being depicted as a dwarf whose face is never seen, as well as a bear cub also repeating exactly the same claim of the bear being a "silly man" after the zoo bears make a similar claim when the bear is brought to the zoo.

Despite being credited as a producer, Tashlin had no involvement in the short, though Jones credited him only in the hopes of Tashlin receiving an Oscar for Best Short should the short win, which it didn't (in those days, Oscars for Best Short were given to the producers, not the director). Overall, Tashlin was dissatisfied with this adaptation of his book, feeling that it didn't present its original message very well.

== Availability ==
The Bear That Wasn't is available on Looney Tunes Golden Collection: Volume 3, Disc 3 on the "From the Vaults" section, and on the Looney Tunes Platinum Collection: Volume 1 Blu-ray box-set on Disc 3 as a bonus feature. It is also available on the Boomerang subscription streaming service under Volume 6 of MGM Cartoons titled Bear That Wasn't.

The cartoon has been screened as part of MeTV's "Tom and Jerry and Friends" cartoon package on Saturday mornings.
