= Tom and Jerry: The Deluxe Anniversary Collection =

DVD set of Tom and Jerry cartoons

The Tom and Jerry Deluxe Anniversary Collection is a two-disc DVD set, released by Warner Home Video.

2010 marked the 70th anniversary of the release of the first Tom and Jerry cartoon, Puss Gets the Boot. To mark the occasion, Warner Home Video released a new DVD featuring 30 shorts.

It was released in the UK on the June 1, 2010 and in the US on June 22, 2010.

All of Disc One have been released on previous Tom and Jerry DVDs, especially the three previous Spotlight Collection and the six Classic Collection volumes.

== Contents ==
=== Disc One ===
All cartoons were previously released on the Tom and Jerry Spotlight Collection, and the Tom and Jerry Classic Collection DVD sets.

^{1} denotes cartoons in the standard Academy ratio presented in remastered versions, as seen on the spotlight DVDs. ^{2} denotes cartoons presented edited. ^{3} denotes Widescreen/CinemaScope cartoons presented cropped to fullscreen. ^{4} denotes cartoons presented in the CinemaScope aspect ratio using a non-anamorphic letterbox widescreen transfer. ^{5} denotes cartoons who won an Academy Award.

1. Puss Gets the Boot^{1}
2. The Midnight Snack^{1}
3. Dog Trouble^{1}
4. Fraidy Cat^{1}
5. Puss n' Toots^{1}
6. The Lonesome Mouse – re-recorded audio track
7. The Yankee Doodle Mouse^{5}
8. Mouse Trouble^{5}
9. Mouse in Manhattan
10. Quiet Please!^{5}
11. The Milky Waif^{2}
12. The Cat Concerto^{5}
13. The Little Orphan^{2} ^{5}
14. Saturday Evening Puss
15. The Two Mouseketeers^{5}
16. Johann Mouse^{5}
17. Touché, Pussy Cat!^{3}
18. That's My Mommy^{3}
19. The Egg and Jerry^{4}
20. Tops with Pops^{4}

==== Bonus Features ====
Much ado about Tom and Jerry (an 18-minute documentary about the history of Tom and Jerry)

Trailers (Not on the region 2 version)

==== Notes ====
Gene Deitch's Dicky Moe (1962) is prominently featured on a Disc 1 menu screen, but is not available on the set.

Just as they were on the original release of the Spotlight Collection, Vol. 1, the shorts The Milky Waif and The Little Orphan have been edited to remove scenes where characters are seen in blackface. Likewise, as it had at one time been on Vol. 2, the short The Lonesome Mouse has redubbed dialogue to remove the stereotypical dialect of the African-American maid (Mammy Two Shoes).

=== Disc Two ===
^{1} denotes cartoons with their opening titles cut. ^{2} denotes cartoons that are new to DVD.

1. Excerpt from Anchors Aweigh (1945)
2. Excerpt from Dangerous When Wet (1953)
3. Pent-House Mouse (1963, Chuck Jones) (from the US version of Tom and Jerry: The Chuck Jones Collection)
4. The Cat Above and The Mouse Below (1964, Chuck Jones) (from the US version of Tom and Jerry: The Chuck Jones Collection)
5. The Cat's Me-Ouch (1965, Chuck Jones) (from the US version of Tom and Jerry: The Chuck Jones Collection)
6. Cosmic Cat and Meteor Mouse (1975, The Tom & Jerry Show, Hanna-Barbera)^{1} ^{2}
7. Jerry's Country Cousin (1980; from the TV series The Tom and Jerry Comedy Show, Filmation)^{1} ^{2}
8. Flippin' Fido (1990; from the TV series Tom & Jerry Kids Show, Hanna-Barbera/Turner Entertainment) ^{2}
9. The Karate Guard (2005, Warner Bros. Animation)
10. Game of Mouse & Cat (2008; from the TV series Tom and Jerry Tales, Warner Bros. Television Animation)

==== Notes ====
The Mansion Cat (2001) is prominently featured on a Disc 2 menu screen but is not available on the set.

As well as Cosmic Cat and Meteor Mouse, the premiere episode of The Tom & Jerry Show has been released as part of Warner Home Video's Saturday Morning Cartoons – 1970s Volume 2 on October 27, 2009; it marked the first home video release of the 1975 made-for-TV version of Tom and Jerry.

The Chuck Jones cartoons are the widescreen restored versions from the Chuck Jones Collection.

== Reception ==
DVD Talk was critical of the compilation and stated, "The quality of these shorts rapidly diminish once we move out of the Chuck Jones era and into the TV era. The most recent selection, "A Game of Mouse and Cat," is a little better than the '70s and '80s junk, but not by much. (And the less said about "Flippin' Fido," in which the characters are turned into kindergarteners, the better.) Anyone buying the Deluxe Anniversary Collection just for these "new" releases will be sorely disappointed in their purchase." Another extensive and negative review, in Animated Views, concluded, "Poor old Tom & Jerry get it again: there's just not much to recommend this collection for. A mishmash selection of cartoons that, while bringing together the pair's seven Oscar wins, misses out many more true classics and notable titles, re-uses the same old prints (some still interlaced), and messes up the screen ratios on the widescreen theatrical offerings." A review for Comics Worth Reading was also negative. However, The Other View called the DVD set a must-have.
