= Tom and Jerry filmography =

The Tom and Jerry series consists of 163 shorts produced and released between 1940 and 2005. Of these, 162 are theatrical shorts while one is a made-for-TV short, subsequently released in theatres.

== 1940–1958: Hanna-Barbera/MGM cartoons ==
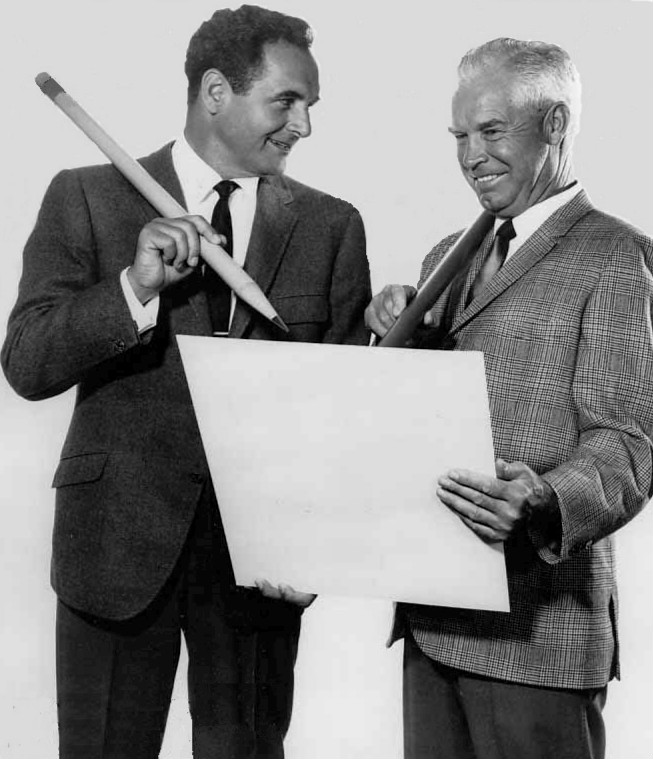
William Hanna (right) and Joseph Barbera (left) in 1965

The following 114 cartoons were directed by William Hanna and Joseph Barbera at the Metro-Goldwyn-Mayer cartoon studio in Hollywood, Los Angeles. All cartoons were released to theaters by Metro-Goldwyn-Mayer. Rudolf Ising was the producer of Puss Gets the Boot; subsequent cartoons were produced by Fred Quimby through 1955. Quimby retired in 1955 and from 1955 to 1957, Hanna and Barbera produced the shorts until MGM closed the cartoon studio in 1957, and the last cartoon was released in 1958. Most of these cartoons were produced in the standard Academy ratio (1.37:1). Four cartoons were produced for both Academy Ratio and CinemaScope formats (2.55:1, later 2.35:1). Finally, 19 cartoons were produced in widescreen CinemaScope format only (though reissues have the standard Academy ratio 1.37:1 instead).

Like the other studios, MGM reissued and edited its cartoons when re-released to theaters. Many pre-1951 cartoons were reissued with Perspecta Sound, which was introduced in 1954. MGM also reissued its cartoons before the introduction of Perspecta Sound. Because of the 1965 MGM vault fire, all original negatives of pre-September-1951 MGM cartoons are lost, leaving only backup nitrate film prints (usually the altered reissue prints), although some production artwork relating to the missing material has survived, like pencil sketches.

=== 1940 ===
No.	Title	Date	Notes
1	Puss Gets the Boot	February 10, 1940	First appearances of Tom (as Jasper), Jerry (as the unnamed mouse), and the housekeeper (never given a name). First Tom and Jerry cartoon nominated for an Academy Award for Best Short Subject, Cartoon. Only cartoon to be produced by Rudolf Ising. Not re-released and retains its original titles.

=== 1941 ===
No.	Title	Date	Notes
2	The Midnight Snack	July 19, 1941	First time Tom and Jerry are referred to by those names. Rereleased in Perspecta Stereo in 1958.
3	The Night Before Christmas	December 6, 1941	Nominated for an Academy Award for Best Short Subjects, Cartoons. Not re-released and retains its original titles.

=== 1942 ===
No.	Title	Date	Notes
4	Fraidy Cat	January 17, 1942	
5	Dog Trouble	April 18, 1942	First appearance of Spike as an unnamed bulldog.
6	Puss n' Toots	May 30, 1942	First appearance of Toots. Rereleased in Perspecta Stereo in 1958.
7	The Bowling Alley-Cat	July 3, 1942	
8	Fine Feathered Friend	October 10, 1942	Reissued with altered titles and music.

=== 1943 ===
No.	Title	Date	Notes
9	Sufferin' Cats!	January 16, 1943	First appearance of Meathead. Reissued with altered titles and music.
10	The Lonesome Mouse	May 22, 1943	Reissued with altered titles and music.
11	The Yankee Doodle Mouse	June 26, 1943	First cartoon to win an Academy Award for Best Short Subject, Cartoon.
12	Baby Puss	October 30, 1943 (Note: Archived from an October 31 article, this is based on the fact that new cartoon shorts would usually premiere in theaters on Saturdays.)	First appearance of Butch and Topsy.

=== 1944 ===
No.	Title	Date	Notes
13	The Zoot Cat	February 10, 1944	
14	The Million Dollar Cat	April 15, 1944 (Note: Archived from an April 17 article, this is based on the fact that new cartoon shorts would usually premiere in theaters on Saturdays.)	Scott Bradley received music credit for this short, despite being scored by Ted Duncan.
15	The Bodyguard	July 13, 1944	First regular appearance of Spike.
16	Puttin' on the Dog	October 28, 1944	
17	Mouse Trouble	November 23, 1944	Won an Academy Award for Best Short Subject, Cartoon.

=== 1945 ===
No.	Title	Date	Notes
18	The Mouse Comes to Dinner	February 3, 1945 (Note: Archived from a February 5 article, this is based on the fact that new cartoon shorts would usually premiere in theaters on Saturdays.)	
19	Mouse in Manhattan	July 7, 1945	A Jerry-centric cartoon where Tom only appears in the beginning and the end.
20	Tee for Two	July 21, 1945	
21	Flirty Birdy	September 22, 1945	
22	Quiet Please!	December 22, 1945	Won an Academy Award for Best Short Subject, Cartoon.

=== 1946 ===
No.	Title	Date	Notes
23	Springtime for Thomas	March 30, 1946	First appearance of Toodles Galore.
24	The Milky Waif	May 18, 1946	First appearance of Nibbles.
25	Trap Happy	June 29, 1946	
26	Solid Serenade	August 31, 1946	

=== 1947 ===
No.	Title	Date	Notes
27	Cat Fishin'	February 22, 1947	
28	Part Time Pal	March 15, 1947	
29	The Cat Concerto	April 26, 1947	Won an Academy Award for Best Short Subject, Cartoon. In 1994, it was voted No. 42 of the 50 Greatest Cartoons of all time by members of the animation field, the only Tom and Jerry cartoon to make the list.
30	Dr. Jekyll and Mr. Mouse	June 14, 1947	Nominated for an Academy Award for Best Short Subject, Cartoon.
31	Salt Water Tabby	July 12, 1947	
32	A Mouse in the House	August 30, 1947	
33	The Invisible Mouse	September 27, 1947	

=== 1948 ===
No.	Title	Date	Notes
34	Kitty Foiled	June 1, 1948	First appearance of Cuckoo.
35	The Truce Hurts	July 17, 1948	
36	Old Rockin' Chair Tom	September 18, 1948	First appearance of Lightning.
37	Professor Tom	October 28, 1948	
38	Mouse Cleaning	December 11, 1948	

=== 1949 ===
No.	Title	Date	Notes
39	Polka-Dot Puss	February 26, 1949	
40	Hatch Up Your Troubles	April 28, 1949	First appearance of the Baby Woodpecker. Nominated for an Academy Award for Best Short Subject, Cartoon.
41	The Little Orphan	April 30, 1949	Won an Academy Award for Best Short Subject, Cartoon. The Chuck Jones-edit exists on one of the early Tom and Jerry Cartoon Festival video releases and The Art of Tom and Jerry LaserDisc.
42	Heavenly Puss	June 16, 1949	Rarely airs in Brazil and the Middle East due to subplots involving damnation in Hell. Rereleased in Perspecta Stereo in 1956.
43	The Cat and the Mermouse	August 11, 1949	Rereleased in Perspecta Stereo in 1957.
44	Love That Pup	September 9, 1949	First appearance of Tyke.
45	Jerry's Diary	October 5, 1949	Compilation short; contains footage from Tee for Two, Mouse Trouble, Solid Serenade, and The Yankee Doodle Mouse.
46	Tennis Chumps	November 18, 1949	Rereleased in Perspecta Stereo in 1957.

=== 1950 ===
No.	Title	Date	Notes
47	Little Quacker	January 7, 1950	First appearances of Quacker, Henry, and Mama Duck. Rereleased in Perspecta Stereo in 1957.
48	Saturday Evening Puss	January 14, 1950	Only (albeit brief) time that the face of housekeeper is shown. Rereleased in Perspecta Stereo in 1957. Rereleased to television in the mid-1960s with housekeeper replaced by a white teenage female, which this version exists on one of the early Tom and Jerry Cartoon Festival video releases and The Art of Tom and Jerry LaserDisc.
49	Texas Tom	March 11, 1950	Rereleased in Perspecta Stereo in 1957.
50	Jerry and the Lion	April 8, 1950	Rereleased in Perspecta Stereo in 1957.
51	Safety Second	July 1, 1950	Rereleased in Perspecta Stereo in 1957.
52	The Hollywood Bowl	September 16, 1950	Rereleased in Perspecta Stereo in 1957.
53	The Framed Cat	October 21, 1950	Rereleased in Perspecta Stereo in 1956.
54	Cue Ball Cat	October 29, 1950	Rereleased in Perspecta Stereo in 1956.

=== 1951 ===
No.	Title	Date	Notes
55	Casanova Cat	January 6, 1951	Rereleased in Perspecta Stereo in 1958.
56	Jerry and the Goldfish	March 3, 1951	Rereleased in Perspecta Stereo in 1958.
57	Sleepy-Time Tom	March 24, 1951	Rereleased in Perspecta Stereo in 1958.
58	Jerry's Cousin	April 7, 1951	Nominated for an Academy Award for Short Subject, Cartoon. First appearance of Muscles Mouse. Rereleased in Perspecta Stereo in 1958.
59	His Mouse Friday	April 22, 1951	Rereleased in Perspecta Stereo in 1958. This short is edited in two ways on the Tom and Jerry on Parade VHS and the Spotlight Collection DVD. It is presented unedited on the Golden Era Anthology Blu-ray and DVD set.
60	Cat Napping	July 4, 1951	
61	Slicked-up Pup	August 27, 1951	
62	Nit-Witty Kitty	September 14, 1951	
63	The Flying Cat	September 23, 1951	
64	The Duck Doctor	October 5, 1951	
65	Triplet Trouble	November 14, 1951	
66	Smitten Kitten	November 21, 1951	Compilation short; contains footage from Salt Water Tabby, The Mouse Comes to Dinner, Texas Tom, and Solid Serenade.
67	Little Runaway	November 21, 1951	

=== 1952 ===
No.	Title	Date	Notes
68	The Two Mouseketeers	January 27, 1952	Won an Academy Award for Best Short Subject, Cartoon.
69	Push-Button Kitty	March 22, 1952	Last appearance of the housekeeper, who was retired from the cartoons.
70	Fit to Be Tied	June 10, 1952	
71	Cruise Cat	October 18, 1952	
72	The Dog House	October 22, 1952	

=== 1953 ===
No.	Title	Date	Notes
73	The Missing Mouse	January 10, 1953	Only Tom and Jerry cartoon scored by Edward Plumb because Scott Bradley was on vacation.
74	Johann Mouse	February 17, 1953	Last cartoon in the series to win an Academy Award for Best Short Subject, Cartoon.
75	Jerry and Jumbo	February 21, 1953	First appearance of Jumbo and his mother.
76	That's My Pup!	April 25, 1953	
77	Just Ducky	September 5, 1953	
78	Two Little Indians	October 17, 1953	
79	Life with Tom	October 28, 1953	Compilation short; contains footage from Cat Fishin', The Little Orphan, and Kitty Foiled.

=== 1954 ===
No.	Title	Date	Notes
80	Puppy Tale	January 23, 1954	
81	Posse Cat	January 30, 1954	
82	Hic-cup Pup	April 3, 1954	
83	Little School Mouse	May 29, 1954	
84	Baby Butch	June 6, 1954	
85	Mice Follies	July 24, 1954	
86	Neapolitan Mouse	October 2, 1954	
87	Downhearted Duckling	November 10, 1954	
88	Pet Peeve	November 20, 1954	Produced simultaneously in both the standard Academy format and in widescreen CinemaScope. Produced in true stereo. First appearances of George and Joan, although their faces are not seen here.
89	Touché, Pussy Cat!	December 18, 1954	Produced simultaneously in both the standard Academy format and in widescreen CinemaScope. Produced in true stereo. Last cartoon to get nominated for an Academy Award for Best Short Subjects, Cartoons.

=== 1955 ===
No.	Title	Date	Notes
90	Southbound Duckling	March 12, 1955	Produced simultaneously in both the standard Academy format and in CinemaScope. Produced in true stereo. This is one of the rare shorts in which Tom emerges victorious over Jerry.
91	Pup on a Picnic	April 30, 1955	Produced simultaneously in both the standard Academy format and in CinemaScope.
92	Mouse for Sale	May 21, 1955	
93	Smarty Cat	July 30, 1955	Compilation short; contains footage from Solid Serenade, Cat Fishin', and Fit to Be Tied.
94	Designs on Jerry	September 2, 1955	
95	Tom and Chérie	September 9, 1955	Produced in CinemaScope. This is the only Tom and Jerry episode during the Hanna-Barbera era where Tom and Jerry never come in contact with each other.
96	Pecos Pest	October 7, 1955	Only appearance of Uncle Pecos. Last Tom and Jerry cartoon released in the standard Academy format. All subsequent Hanna-Barbera cartoons were released in CinemaScope. Last Tom and Jerry cartoon released with Fred Quimby as producer.
97	That's My Mommy	November 7, 1955	Produced in CinemaScope. First Tom and Jerry cartoon with William Hanna and Joseph Barbera as both producers and directors.
98	The Egg and Jerry	December 30, 1955	Produced in CinemaScope. CinemaScope remake of Hatch Up Your Troubles and first of the three CinemaScope remakes.

=== 1956 ===
No.	Title	Date	Notes
99	The Flying Sorceress	January 27, 1956	The first short Joan's face is seen. Produced in CinemaScope.
100	Busy Buddies	May 4, 1956	First appearance of Jeannie and the Baby. Produced in CinemaScope.
101	Muscle Beach Tom	September 7, 1956	Produced in CinemaScope.
102	Down Beat Bear	October 21, 1956	Produced in CinemaScope.
103	Blue Cat Blues	November 4, 1956	Due to its ending implying the deaths of Tom and Jerry, the short is frequently misreported online as Tom and Jerry's "last episode" or "ending".
104	Barbecue Brawl	December 14, 1956	Produced in CinemaScope and Perspecta Stereo.

=== 1957 ===
No.	Title	Date	Notes
105	Tops with Pops	February 17, 1957	Produced in CinemaScope and Perspecta Stereo. CinemaScope remake version of Love That Pup and second of the three Cinemascope remakes.
106	Timid Tabby	April 19, 1957	Produced in CinemaScope and Perspecta Stereo.
107	Feedin' the Kiddie	June 7, 1957	Produced in CinemaScope and Perspecta Stereo. Remake of The Little Orphan with Nibbles named as Tuffy and is Jerry's nephew.
108	Tom's Photo Finish	July 4, 1957	Produced in CinemaScope and Perspecta Stereo.
109	Royal Cat Nap	July 19, 1957	Produced in CinemaScope and Perspecta Stereo.
110	Mucho Mouse	September 6, 1957	Produced in CinemaScope and Perspecta Stereo.
111	Happy Go Ducky	October 27, 1957	Produced in CinemaScope and Perspecta Stereo.

=== 1958 ===
No.	Title	Date	Notes
112	The Vanishing Duck	March 30, 1958	Produced in CinemaScope and Perspecta Stereo.
113	Robin Hoodwinked	May 8, 1958	Produced in CinemaScope and Perspecta Stereo.
114	Tot Watchers	June 25, 1958	Produced in CinemaScope and Perspecta Stereo.

== 1961–1962: Gene Deitch/Rembrandt Films cartoons ==
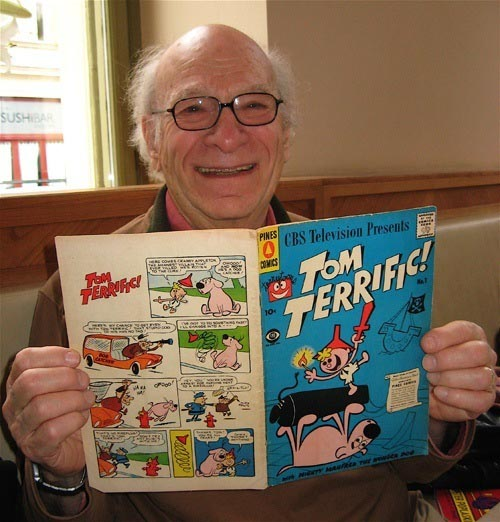
Gene Deitch in 2007

The following thirteen cartoons were directed by Gene Deitch, produced by William L. Snyder, and animated at Snyder's Rembrandt Films in Prague, Czechoslovakia (now in the Czech Republic). All cartoons were released to theaters by Metro-Goldwyn-Mayer.

=== 1961 ===
No.	Title	Date	Notes
115	Switchin' Kitten	September 7, 1961	
116	Down and Outing	October 4, 1961	
117	It's Greek to Me-ow!	November 15, 1961	

=== 1962 ===
No.	Title	Date	Notes
118	High Steaks	March 23, 1962	
119	Mouse into Space	April 2, 1962	
120	Landing Stripling	May 17, 1962	
121	Calypso Cat	June 9, 1962	
122	Dicky Moe	July 20, 1962	
123	The Tom and Jerry Cartoon Kit	August 10, 1962	
124	Tall in the Trap	September 14, 1962	Only short to be written by Tedd Pierce, who sold the storyboard to MGM due to Robert McKimson rejecting it for a potential Speedy Gonzales short.
125	Sorry Safari	October 12, 1962	
126	Buddies... Thicker Than Water	November 1, 1962	
127	Carmen Get It!	December 21, 1962	

== 1963–1967: Chuck Jones/Sib Tower cartoons ==
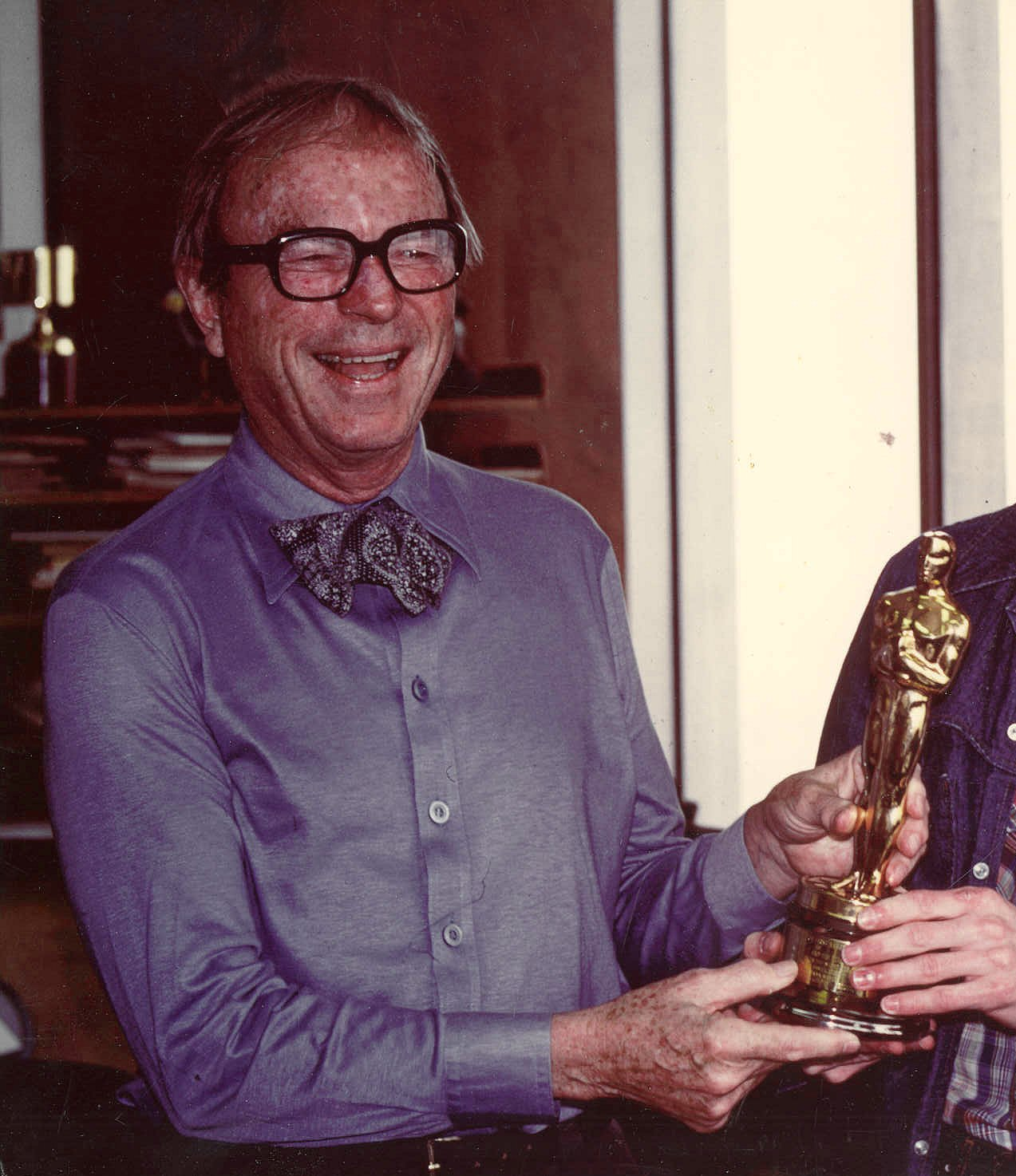
Chuck Jones in 1978

The following 34 cartoons were produced by Chuck Jones in Hollywood, Los Angeles. Earlier cartoons were produced in conjunction with Walter Bien's Sib Tower 12 Productions (one or the other credited on the 1963 and 1964 productions), until it was integrated into a new animation department called MGM Animation/Visual Arts. Directors (if other than Jones) or co-directors for each short are listed. All cartoons were released to theaters by Metro-Goldwyn-Mayer. Note: All the Chuck Jones MGM Tom and Jerry shorts were in Metrocolor.

All were released on DVD in 2009 as part of Tom and Jerry: The Chuck Jones Collection.

=== 1963 ===
No.	Title	Date	Notes
128	Pent-House Mouse	July 27, 1963	

=== 1964 ===
No.	Title	Date	Notes
129	The Cat Above and the Mouse Below	February 25, 1964	
130	Is There a Doctor in the Mouse?	March 24, 1964	
131	Much Ado About Mousing	April 14, 1964	
132	Snowbody Loves Me	May 12, 1964	
133	The Unshrinkable Jerry Mouse	December 8, 1964	

=== 1965 ===
No.	Title	Date	Notes
134	Tom-ic Energy	January 7, 1965	
135	Ah, Sweet Mouse-Story of Life	January 20, 1965	
136	Bad Day at Cat Rock	February 10, 1965	
137	The Brothers Carry-Mouse-Off	March 3, 1965	Directed by Jim Pabian.
138	Haunted Mouse	March 24, 1965	
139	I'm Just Wild About Jerry	April 7, 1965	
140	Of Feline Bondage	May 19, 1965	
141	The Year of the Mouse	June 9, 1965	
142	The Cat's Me-Ouch!	December 22, 1965	

=== 1966 ===
No.	Title	Date	Notes
143	Duel Personality	January 15, 1966	
144	Jerry, Jerry, Quite Contrary	February 17, 1966	
145	Jerry-Go-Round	March 3, 1966	Directed by Abe Levitow.
146	Love Me, Love My Mouse	April 28, 1966	Directed by Chuck Jones and Ben Washam. Last appearance of Toodles.
147	Puss 'n' Boats	May 5, 1966	Directed by Abe Levitow.
148	Filet Meow	June 30, 1966	Directed by Abe Levitow.
149	Matinee Mouse	July 14, 1966	Direction credited to William Hanna and Joseph Barbera, with story and supervision by Tom Ray. Compilation short; contains footage from The Flying Cat, Professor Tom, The Missing Mouse, Jerry and the Lion, Love That Pup, The Flying Sorceress, Jerry's Diary, and The Truce Hurts as Tom and Jerry watch themselves in a theater.
150	The A-Tom-inable Snowman	August 4, 1966	Directed by Abe Levitow.
151	Catty-Cornered	September 8, 1966	Directed by Abe Levitow.
152	Guided Mouse-ille	October 19, 1966	Directed by Abe Levitow.

=== 1967 ===
No.	Title	Date	Notes
153	Cat and Dupli-cat	January 20, 1967	
154	O-Solar-Meow	February 24, 1967	Directed by Abe Levitow.
155	Rock 'n' Rodent	April 7, 1967	Directed by Abe Levitow.
156	Cannery Rodent	April 14, 1967	
157	The Mouse from H.U.N.G.E.R.	April 21, 1967	Directed by Abe Levitow.
158	Surf-Bored Cat	May 5, 1967	Directed by Abe Levitow.
159	Shutter Bugged Cat	June 23, 1967	Direction credited to William Hanna and Joseph Barbera, with story and supervision by Tom Ray. Compilation short; Contains footage from Part Time Pal, The Yankee Doodle Mouse, Nit-Witty Kitty, Johann Mouse, Heavenly Puss, and Designs on Jerry.
160	Advance and Be Mechanized	August 25, 1967	Directed by Ben Washam. Followup to O-Solar-Meow. Contains footage from Guided Mouse-ille.
161	Purr-Chance to Dream	September 8, 1967	Directed by Ben Washam. Followup to The Cat's Me-Ouch.

== 2001–present: Warner Bros. cartoons ==
=== 2001: Hanna-Barbera Productions/Turner Entertainment cartoon ===
No.	Title	Date	Notes
162	The Mansion Cat	April 8, 2001	Only made-for-TV short. Directed by Karl Toerge. Contains footage from Muscle Beach Tom.

=== 2005: Warner Bros. Animation cartoons ===
No.	Title	Date	Notes
163	The Karate Guard	September 27, 2005	Directed by Joseph Barbera and Spike Brandt.

== Other ==
=== TV series ===
- The Tom & Jerry Show (1975, 16 episodes)
- The Tom and Jerry Comedy Show (1980, 15 episodes)
- Tom & Jerry Kids (1990–93, 65 episodes)
- Tom and Jerry Tales (2006–08, 26 episodes)
- The Tom and Jerry Show (2014–21, 118 episodes)
- Tom and Jerry in New York (2021, 13 episodes)
- Tom and Jerry Special Shorts (2021, 2 episodes)
- Tom and Jerry Gokko (2022, 14 episodes)
- Tom and Jerry (2023, 7 episodes)
- Tom and Jerry Time (2025, 2 episodes)

=== Feature films ===
- Tom and Jerry: The Movie (1992)
- Tom and Jerry (2021)
- Tom and Jerry: Forbidden Compass (2025)

=== Direct-to-video films ===
- Tom and Jerry: The Magic Ring (2002)
- Tom and Jerry: Blast Off to Mars (2005)
- Tom and Jerry: The Fast and the Furry (2005)
- Tom and Jerry: Shiver Me Whiskers (2006)
- Tom and Jerry: A Nutcracker Tale (2007)
- Tom and Jerry Meet Sherlock Holmes (2010)
- Tom and Jerry and the Wizard of Oz (2011)
- Tom and Jerry: Robin Hood and His Merry Mouse (2012)
- Tom and Jerry's Giant Adventure (2013)
- Tom and Jerry: The Lost Dragon (2014)
- Tom and Jerry: Spy Quest (2015)
- Tom and Jerry: Back to Oz (2016)
- Tom and Jerry: Willy Wonka and the Chocolate Factory (2017)
- Tom and Jerry: Cowboy Up! (2022)
- Tom and Jerry: Snowman's Land (2022)

=== Television specials ===
- Hanna-Barbera's 50th: A Yabba Dabba Doo Celebration, 1989 live-action TV special
- Tom and Jerry: Santa's Little Helpers, 2014 TV special
- A Fundraising Adventure, 2014 Children in Need special by BBC

=== Other appearances ===
- The Alley Cat (1941, MGM one-shot cartoon) with Butch and Toodles
- War Dogs (1943, MGM one-shot cartoon) with Spike cameo
- Anchors Aweigh (1945) with Tom and Jerry cameo
- Dangerous When Wet (1953) with Tom and Jerry cameo
- Spike and Tyke (1957, MGM cartoon series) with Spike and Tyke
