= Tom and Jerry: The Chuck Jones Collection =

DVD set of Tom and Jerry cartoons

Box art

Tom and Jerry: The Chuck Jones Collection is a two-disc DVD collection of animated short cartoons starring Tom and Jerry, produced by Chuck Jones, released by Warner Home Video on June 23, 2009, in the US and September 21, 2009, in the UK. These are the same 34 cartoons that appear on European DVD collection in PAL format, Tom and Jerry: The Classic Collection - Volume 6 (dual format or disc 11 or 12 in single side format). All 34 of the Chuck Jones Tom and Jerry shorts are included, along with two new documentaries. All versions of this set (including the Region 2 version) are shown in matted 1.75:1 widescreen, unlike the Classic Collection, which present the shorts in filmed 1:37:1 Academy ratio, as shown in theatres.

== Disc 1 ==
=== 1963 ===
- 01 Pent-House Mouse

=== 1964 ===
- 02 The Cat Above and the Mouse Below
- 03 Is There a Doctor in the Mouse?
- 04 Much Ado About Mousing
- 05 Snowbody Loves Me
- 06 The Unshrinkable Jerry Mouse

=== 1965 ===
- 07 Ah, Sweet Mouse-Story of Life
- 08 Tom-ic Energy
- 09 Bad Day at Cat Rock
- 10 The Brothers Carry-Mouse-Off
- 11 Haunted Mouse
- 12 I'm Just Wild About Jerry
- 13 Of Feline Bondage
- 14 The Year of the Mouse
- 15 The Cat's Me-Ouch

=== 1966 ===
- 16 Duel Personality
- 17 Jerry, Jerry, Quite Contrary

== Disc 2 ==
=== 1966 ===
- 18 Jerry-Go-Round
- 19 Love Me, Love My Mouse
- 20 Puss 'n' Boats
- 21 Filet Meow
- 22 Matinee Mouse
- 23 The A-Tom-inable Snowman
- 24 Catty-Cornered

=== 1967 ===
- 25 Cat and Dupli-cat
- 26 O-Solar Meow
- 27 Guided Mouse-ille
- 28 Rock 'n' Rodent
- 29 Cannery Rodent
- 30 The Mouse from H.U.N.G.E.R.
- 31 Surf-Bored Cat
- 32 Shutter Bugged Cat
- 33 Advance and Be Mechanized
- 34 Purr-Chance to Dream

== Bonus features ==
- Tom and Jerry...and Chuck
- Chuck Jones: Memories of Childhood, by Peggy Stern and John Canemaker

== Reception ==
"The Chuck Jones Collection isn't exactly the highest point in Tom and Jerry history, but a handful of hidden gems elevate this two-disc set to moderate heights. Those unfamiliar with the Jones-era shorts may have trouble adjusting, mostly due to déjà vu from Jones' own work on Looney Tunes.", commented DVD Talk. Collider praised the collection.
