= Puss 'n' Boats =

- Title Card
- Directed by: Abe Levitow; Title director: Chuck Jones
- Story by: Bob Ogle
- Produced by: Chuck Jones
- Music by: Carl Brandt
- Animation by: Ben Washam; Ken Harris; Don Towsley; Tom Ray; Dick Thompson
- Layouts by: Don Morgan
- Backgrounds by: Philip DeGuard
- Color process: Metrocolor
- Production company: MGM Animation/Visual Arts
- Distributed by: Metro-Goldwyn-Mayer
- Release date: May 5, 1966
- Running time: 6:39
- Country: United States

Puss 'n' Boats is a 1966 Tom and Jerry animated short. It was directed by Abe Levitow and produced by Chuck Jones, and is the first short with Carl Brandt as music composer. The title's a play-on-words of the phrase "Puss in Boots", and is similar to Cruise Cat (1952), from the Hanna-Barbera era.

In the film, Jerry impersonates a sea captain aboard a ship. In a scene taking place in the stratosphere, there is a depiction of an unnamed astronaut from the Gemini spacecraft doing a spacewalk and waving at Tom. The final scenes of the film involve Jerry trying to feed Tom to a shark, resulting in Tom fleeing with the shark in pursuit.

== Plot ==
A ship is loading a crate of cheese, according to the stamps on the outside in Spanish, French and English. The smell drifts into a mousehole, where Jerry, sleeping with a sailor's hat on, is woken up by the smell. The smell seems to have a life of its own, as it drags backwards and takes a sleeping Jerry with it. The yellow stream opens one of Jerry's eyes to reveal he is dreaming of cheese, and then bops Jerry on the head.

Jerry wakes up and sees the crate of cheese. Jerry salutes the stream, and runs toward it. He soon runs into the stream holding out a "hand". It points out that Tom is guarding the boarding ramp. Jerry slumps until he sees Tom salute the captain ascending the ramp. Jerry goes into his hole and takes out duplicate clothes. Tom is puzzled to see a second captain, but all the same must salute as Jerry-captain prances up the steps. As soon as Jerry is up on the ramp, Tom investigates the situation. He notices the captain is moving slow, there is a broom where his head should be, and then spots the body of the mouse poking out from under the uniform. He immediately thinks that Jerry has gone stupid.

Tom smirks and pushes the ramp aside such that Jerry falls into the water. Only the captain's hat is seen for a few seconds, and then a shark pops out of the water and almost eats him. Jerry turns white and frantically runs into his hole and shuts the volume closing door. Tom is laughing himself silly until he sees the real captain falling off the edge of the ship because the ramp has moved. Since there is no time, Tom dashes over and holds his hands up, ready to catch the falling officer, but he only squashes Tom through a hole in the wood. The shark then pops out and attacks Tom, but Tom pushes himself through the pier and escapes. Tom's head is stuck in the board's hole, but he's safe. Jerry then proceeds to twist the board like a helicopter propeller and Tom lifts off. Tom stops the board's rotation and unravels his neck, and then frees himself from the board.

Tom sighs in relief until he sees that he is falling. He grabs the board again and uses it to fly like a glider. He dives after Jerry, and when Jerry spots him, Tom chases him into a vent pipe. However, Tom is squeezed through the hole in his board and bounces around through the pipe. Tom crawls through shorter widths of pipe in order to catch Jerry, and when the chase exits the plumbing, Tom is compressed into a cylinder with legs barely a centimeter wide, forming himself in some kind of a walking stick. When Tom realizes this, he takes a deep breath and uncompresses himself, briefly looking like a more monstrous feline in the process. Tom grabs a large hose and dashes after Jerry. Jerry has opened the crate of cheese and is munching away when Tom thrusts the hose in his face. Jerry braces for the deluge, but when Tom opens the valve, nothing comes out because it isn't turned on. Tom rattles the hose cluelessly and Jerry turns it on. The stream of water and the hose blast Tom around randomly until the hose forms a rocket and Tom blasts off into the stratosphere. An astronaut doing a spacewalk from the Gemini spacecraft waves at him.

Tom waves back and points the hose upward, and then soon sees he's about to fall. He then stops the water flow, but this causes the hose to inflate. Tom grins innocently and then the hose bursts. He falls down and panics, but Jerry throws a lifesaver ring. Tom falls down, confident he will be saved; however, this was an elaborate trap. Jerry whistles and the shark pops out, confused, but then sees Tom and swallows him. Soon, however, the shark cannot stomach him, and spits him out, as misfortune would have it, into the ship's furnace.

Tom screams out in pain as he runs out with his tail on fire. Tom knows that the shark is waiting in the water, but as the fire on his tail grows larger, Tom has no choice. Tom falls in and the shark chases him through the water and floats away out of sight. Jerry takes his place as a "guard" of the ship. He blows a whistle, salutes the captain, and does the dance jig to the audience at the end of the cartoon.

== Additional Crew ==
- Production Supervised by: Les Goldman
- Animation: Ben Washam, Ken Harris, Don Towsley, Tom Ray, & Dick Thompson
- Layout: Don Morgan
- Backgrounds: Philip DeGuard
- Produced by Chuck Jones
- Vocal Effects: Mel Blanc & William Hanna
- Graphics Advisor: Maurice Noble
