= The Brothers Karamazov (disambiguation) =

The Brothers Karamazov is a novel by Fyodor Dostoevsky.

The Brothers Karamazov may also refer to:

- The Brothers Karamazov (1921 film), a German film based on the novel
- The Brothers Karamazov (1947 film), an Italian film by Giacomo Gentilomo
- The Brothers Karamazov (1958 film), an American film based on the novel
- The Brothers Karamazov (1969 film), a Soviet film based on the novel
- The Karamazov Brothers (film), a 2008 Czech film based on the novel
- The Brothers Karamazov (2009 TV series), a Russian television series (8x52 minutes) based on the novel

== See also ==
- The Brothers Carry-Mouse-Off, a 1965 Tom and Jerry short
- The Flying Karamazov Brothers, a juggling troupe
