= The Brothers Carry-Mouse-Off =

- Title Card
- Directed by: Jim Pabian; Co-director: Maurice Noble; Title director: Chuck Jones
- Story by: Chuck Jones; Jim Pabian
- Produced by: Chuck Jones; Les Goldman; Earl Jonas
- Starring: Mel Blanc; William Hanna
- Music by: Eugene Poddany
- Animation by: Tom Ray; Dick Thompson; Ben Washam; Ken Harris; Don Towsley
- Backgrounds by: Robert Gribbroek
- Color process: Metrocolor
- Production company: MGM Animation/Visual Arts
- Distributed by: Metro-Goldwyn-Mayer
- Release date: March 3, 1965
- Running time: 6:27

The Brothers Carry-Mouse-Off is a 1965 Tom and Jerry short (though the year of copyright is 1966) produced by Chuck Jones, and the only one directed by Jim Pabian. Jones and Pabian wrote the story and Eugene Poddany scored music, while Maurice Noble did the layouts and Robert Gribbroek did the backgrounds. The title's a parody of Fyodor Dostoevsky's The Brothers Karamazov.

== Plot ==
Jerry is relaxing in a beach chair reading a book. Jerry has actually incorporated a radar system, a chair, a pool, and a tree. Jerry's radar twitches and detects Tom approaching his mouse hole, Jerry presses a red button next to the radio which folds the entire patio into the floor and he goes in his mousehole.

Tom creeps up with a box and peers into Jerry's hole while Jerry exits his hole through an outlet without being seen, though Tom feels something on his head when Jerry perches on it. Tom sets out various food items such as traps, while Jerry sweeps up all the food with a fishing line with a plunger attached and dumps it back in the box without being spotted. Tom feels his head and Jerry moves out of the way. He deals out all the food a second time, and this time taps a nail into each one. Jerry merely attracts them all with a magnet. Jerry then dashes away as Tom discovers the food missing again. Then, he spots the mouse running away and shoots the plunger like an arrow at Jerry and he captures the mouse. Jerry pulls a diminutive hammer out of the food. Tom laughs without resistance, believing this will not hurt him. However, the hammer extends and expands six sizes larger and Jerry whacks Tom, smashing him into an accordion.

Jerry prances past and soon Tom recovers enough to chase him. Tom leaps in front of Jerry's hole and rolls out his tongue. Jerry is caught but fights against the tongue so hard that he escapes and Tom's tongue rolls back into his mouth, twisting the cat into a roll. Jerry pulls Tom's tail to unfurl him and then uses him as a doormat, thus waking the flattened cat who then tries to block Jerry's mouse hole. However, Jerry is not easily fooled by this trick and decides to escape as Tom glides and jumps over the ground in order to pursue the mouse because he is still flat. Tom spots a bellows and tries to inflate himself but he is too flat and not heavy enough to pump it. Jerry turns up, disguised as a bearded doctor. He offers to do the job for him, and Tom accepts it. Jerry pumps Tom up enough to launch him to crash into a bunch of furniture. Tom tiptoes out of the pile of broken furniture and gets himself out of a goldfish bowl and the goldfish from his mouth. He kicks it away with his toe.

Tom chases Jerry upstairs. Jerry shuts himself in a doorway. Unable to open it, Tom charges at it. Jerry opens the door revealing nothing but empty air. Tom's shrieks and he just manages to brake before falling off, but Jerry snaps his fingers and Tom loses balance and plummets. Tom gets a bump forming on his head.

Tom then has an idea. He runs up to the attic, dresses up in a pretty and beautiful white female mouse suit, and squirts himself with perfume in order to lure Jerry. Tom plays a small guitar as he prances out to the living room. Jerry smells the perfume as he is relaxing in his indoor patio and dashes to Tom and starts kissing him. However, Tom ends up attracting a whole group of mice, who argue among each other over who should have him. As they fight, Tom runs outside. He hides behind a trash can and finds out the zip of the mouse costume jammed. He is spotted by several dumb but hungry cats, who chase Tom as Jerry the real mouse watches with a little disappointment from afar and a heart-shaped iris out appears with "The End" in it and stops on a heart shape in the tree.

== Crew ==
- Co-Director & Layouts: Maurice Noble
- Story: Chuck Jones & Jim Pabian
- Animation: Tom Ray, Dick Thompson, Ben Washam, Ken Harris, & Don Towsley.
- Backgrounds: Robert Gribbroek
- Vocal Effects: Mel Blanc & William Hanna
- Production Manager: Earl Jonas
- Music: Eugene Poddany
- Production Supervised by Les Goldman
- Produced by Chuck Jones
- Directed by Jim Pabian
