= Don Towsley (animator) =

American animator (1912-1986)

Donald F. Towsley
- Born: May 11, 1912; Milwaukee, Wisconsin, U.S.
- Died: November 25, 1986 (aged 74); Los Angeles, California, U.S.
- Occupations: animator, director

Don Towsley (May 11, 1912 – November 25, 1986) was an animator working at Walt Disney Animation Studios, and later at MGM and Filmation.

== Career ==
Starting out at Disney, Towsley worked on three shorts in the Silly Symphony series, animating the band in The Cookie Carnival (1935), a scene of dancing hens ultimately cut from Cock o' the Walk (1935), and the introduction and opening scene of Donald's Better Self (1938). In 1938, Towsley became the main animator for the Donald Duck short films, following Fred Spencer's death.

Towsley contributed to the 1940 film Pinocchio, as part of the team responsible for Jiminy Cricket and Monstro the Whale. He also animated the "Pastoral Symphony" segment of the 1940 film Fantasia.

In 1943, Towsley, along with a team of animators, contributed to a wartime animated short film titled Der Fuehrer's Face produced by Walt Disney.

In 1948, after leaving the Disney studio, Towsley created a line of children's wallpaper cutouts, featuring images of animals.

In the 1960s, Towsley worked for MGM's Tom and Jerry series, including animation work on 1965's Haunted Mouse.

Towsley joined the Filmation animation studio in 1968 as an associate director. He directed episodes of Fat Albert and the Cosby Kids (1972–1974), My Favorite Martians (1973–1975), The New Adventures of Gilligan (1974–1977), The U.S. of Archie (1974–1976), The New Adventures of Batman (1977), Sabrina, Super Witch (1977–1978) and The New Adventures of Flash Gordon (1979–1980), among others. He also directed a sequence in Filmation's 1972 film, Journey Back to Oz.

== Films worked on ==
=== 1930s ===
- Two-Gun Mickey (1934)
- Mickey's Service Station (1935)
- The Cookie Carnival (1935)
- Moving Day (1936)
- Donald's Golf Game (1938)
- Donald's Cousin Gus (1939)

=== 1940s ===
- Pinocchio (1940)
- Fantasia (animation supervisor) (segment "The Pastoral Symphony") (1940)
- Dumbo (1941)
- Bambi (additional animation - uncredited) (1942)
- The Plastics Inventor (1944)
- Donald's Crime (1945)
- Cured Duck (1945)
- Old Sequoia (1945)
- Sleepy Time Donald (1946)
- Donald's Double Trouble (1946)
- Wet Paint (1946)
- Dumb Bell of the Yukon (1946)
- It's a Grand Old Nag (supervising animator) (1947)
- Donald's Dilemma (1947)
- Crazy with the Heat (1947)
- Wide Open Spaces (1947)
- Drip Dippy Donald (1948)

=== 1960s ===
- Talking of Tomorrow (1960)
- The Yogi Bear Show TV series (1961)
- Penthouse Mouse (additional/title animation - uncredited) (1963)
- The Unshrinkable Jerry Mouse (1964)
- Snowbody Loves Me (1964)
- Much Ado About Mousing (1964)
- Is There a Doctor in the Mouse? (1964)
- The Cat Above and the Mouse Below (1964)
- A Taste of Catnip (additional animation - uncredited) (marking Towsley's last animations of Sylvster) (1965)
- The Year of the Mouse ... a.k.a. Tom Thump (1965)
- Tom-ic Energy (1965)
- Of Feline Bondage (1965)
- Jerry-Go-Round (1965)
- I'm Just Wild About Jerry (1965)
- Haunted Mouse (1965)
- Duel Personality (1965)
- The Cat's Me-Ouch (1965)
- The Brothers Carry-Mouse-Off (1965)
- Bad Day at Cat Rock (1965)
- Ah, Sweet Mouse-Story of Life (1965)
- The Man from Button Willow (1965)
- The Dot and the Line ... a.k.a. The Dot and the Line: A Romance in Lower Mathematics (supervising animator) (1965)
- Matinee Mouse (title animation - uncredited) (1966)
- Puss 'n' Boats (1966)
- Love Me, Love My Mouse (1966)
- Jerry, Jerry, Quite Contrary (1966)
- Filet Meow (1966)
- Catty-Cornered (1966)
- The A-Tom-Inable Snowman (1966)
- How the Grinch Stole Christmas! (TV) ... a.k.a. Dr. Seuss' How the Grinch Stole Christmas! (USA: complete title) (1966)
- Shutter Bugged Cat (title animation - uncredited) (1967)
- Surf-Bored Cat (1967)
- Rock 'n' Rodent (1967)
- Purr-Chance to Dream (1967)
- O-Solar Meow (1967)
- The Mouse from H.U.N.G.E.R. (1967)
- Guided Mouse-ille ... a.k.a. Guided Mouse-ille or Science on a Wet Afternoon (1967)
- Cat and Dupli-cat (1967)
- Cannery Rodent (1967)
- Advance and Be Mechanized (1967)
- The Bear That Wasn't (1967)
- "The Batman/Superman Hour" TV series (associate director) (1968)
- "The Archie Show" TV series (associate director) (1968)
- Carte Blanched (additional animator: animation)
- Pink on the Cob (additional animator: animation) (1969)

=== 1970s and 1980s ===
- Horton Hears a Who! (animator) (1970)
- The Phantom Tollbooth (animator) (1970)
- The Aristocats (animator) (1970)
- Journey Back to Oz (sequence director) (1972)
- Treasure Island (sequence director) (1973)
- U.S. of Archie (director) (1974)
- The New Adventures of Gilligan (director) (1974)
- Oliver Twist (sequence director) (1974)
- Fraidy Cat (1975)
- The Space Sentinels TV series (animation director) ... a.k.a. The Young Sentinels (USA) (1977)
- Mickey Mouse Disco (1980)
