= Zoom at the Top =

- Title card
- Directed by: Chuck Jones; Maurice Noble (co-director)
- Written by: Chuck Jones
- Edited by: Treg Brown
- Music by: Milt Franklyn
- Animation by: Ken Harris; Richard Thompson; Bob Bransford; Tom Ray
- Layouts by: Maurice Noble (uncredited)
- Backgrounds by: Philip DeGuard
- Color process: Technicolor
- Production company: Warner Bros. Cartoons
- Distributed by: Warner Bros. Pictures
- Release date: June 30, 1962 (US)
- Running time: 6 minutes
- Language: English

Zoom at the Top is a 1962 Merrie Melodies cartoon directed by Chuck Jones and designer Maurice Noble. The short was released on June 30, 1962, and stars Wile E. Coyote and the Road Runner.

== Plot ==
The Road Runner (Disappearialis Quickius) zooms to the end of a cliff and watches as Wile E. Coyote (Overconfidentii Vulgaris) takes steps back on a different cliff, attempting to jump to the other side, and the end falls off when he steps on it, and the title appears. While falling, the rock turns upside down and Wile E. struggles to get on the new top side. He thinks that he made it to the top and starts panting, but then realizes he is actually upside down again. He gets the pointy end stuck between two cliff ends. He then goes on the left end, but that end falls off and hits the ground, and a small accordion-squished Wile E. walks away with the coney cliff end on him.

Later, Wile E., who is back to normal, then again chases the Road Runner. When the Road Runner stops at the top of a natural arch and gets Wile E. to stop as well, the bird points at the ground. Wile E.'s nose then points to the ground, before he falls to the ground once more. The Road Runner zips off and Wile E. tries to deduce how the bird managed to defy gravity, but finally admits he is clueless.

1. Wile E. then sets up a bear trap in the middle of the road, struggling in the process. Once the trap is set, he places a bowl of ACME Bird Seed on the trap's base and hides behind a rock. The Road Runner sees the bird seed, eats it, leaps happily on the base and zooms off, but the trap does not go off. Confused, the Coyote approaches the trap with an oilcan, applies a tiny drop of oil to the base (while standing inside the trap), [big mistake!] and then it finally closes—on him. The zigzag-shaped Coyote walks off with a deadpan "Ouch".

2. An attempt to chase the Road Runner with a jet mobile ends up with the motor's fire burning the support beam, causing the entire apparatus to collapse.

3. Wile E. uses an ACME Instant Icicle Maker. "Freeze Your Friend-Loads of Laughs". After experimenting on a cactus, he tries to freeze the Road Runner. As soon as he hears the "Beep-Beep", [which didn't happen] he jumps out on the road to see the approaching bird, but the machine then activates, freezing the Coyote instead. Wile E. tries to thaw himself out with a magnifying glass, but only ends up melting himself into a puddle along with the ice as well.

4. Finally, the Coyote paints iron glue on an ACME Boomerang, but when he prepares to launch the boomerang, the glue droops down onto his hand, sticking the Coyote onto the boomerang and carrying him with it as he throws it. While still in the air, Wile E. attempts to free himself from the sticky boomerang; laughing at one point thinking he has extricated himself from his airborne pickled jam. He fights with it, but only ends up getting both his hands stuck on his head and the boomerang stuck on his back legs. He crashes rear first on the ground, then walks away side by side. An iris out shaped like a boomerang appears, then stops to show the words The End.

== Crew ==
- Co-Director & Layouts: Maurice Noble
- Animation: Ken Harris, Richard Thompson, Bob Bransford, Tom Ray & Morey Reden
- Backgrounds: Philip DeGuard
- Film Editor: Treg Brown
- Voice Characterizations: Mel Blanc & Paul Julian
- Music: Milt Franklyn
- Written & Directed by Chuck Jones

== Home media ==
This short is available on disc 1 of the Looney Tunes Collector's Vault: Volume 2 Blu-ray set.
