= Pent-House Mouse =

1963 animated short film directed by Chuck Jones

- Title card
- Directed by: Chuck Jones; Maurice Noble
- Story by: Chuck Jones; Michael Maltese
- Produced by: Chuck Jones; Les Goldman; Walter Bien
- Starring: Mel Blanc
- Music by: Eugene Poddany
- Animation by: Ken Harris; Tom Ray; Dick Thompson; Ben Washam
- Color process: Metrocolor
- Production company: Sib Tower 12 Productions
- Distributed by: Metro-Goldwyn-Mayer
- Release date: July 27, 1963
- Running time: 7:12
- Country: United States
- Language: English

Pent-House Mouse is the first Tom and Jerry short produced and directed by Chuck Jones after being fired from Warner Bros. Cartoons, released in 1963. Production returned to Hollywood after five years (the previous 13 shorts were produced in Czechoslovakia and directed by Gene Deitch). It is also the only Tom and Jerry cartoon to be produced in 1963.

== Plot ==
Tom is relaxing in a penthouse, while Jerry is struggling to look for food, being forced to tie his tail around his waist to stop his stomach growling. Suddenly Jerry sees a lunchbox at a 125-story skyscraper construction site and jumps into it, eating through to it. However, the steel beam on which the lunchbox is sitting is lifted into the air and the box slides off. Jerry tries to hide in the lunchbox, but it bursts open. The lunchbox then falls onto Tom's head, much to Tom's annoyance, but Tom sees Jerry falling and catches him in a baseball glove in between two pieces of bread.

Tom eats the sandwich, but notices he missed eating Jerry. Tom eats the rest of the sandwich, but Jerry escapes by flicking Tom's middle finger into his eye. Jerry jumps into a rain gutter, but is unaware that he slides back onto the construction site, barely managing to evade a crusher. Jerry jumps into Tom's mouth and closes his ears and eyes, but Tom shakes Jerry out. Tom grabs a flyswatter and splats the mouse with it 4 times, but on the 5th attempt, Jerry angrily stops him. He marches towards Tom and holds out his hand as if to say, "Hand over the flyswatter." And then he flattens Tom's head to escape.

Jerry runs to the end of a flagpole, with Tom following, but Jerry spins the pole counterclockwise. Tom, running very fast, convinces Jerry to stop. He momentarily sports a halo and points at it as a promise to make amends, but Jerry lets Tom know that he loves him before unscrewing the ball. Tom thinks that Jerry is crazy, but the cat and the flagpole are sent down to the construction site as Jerry, still standing on the ball in midair, rolls back to the penthouse. Tom eventually ends up rolling on a barrel and encounters the same crusher that almost smashed Jerry. He too evades the crusher and is relieved for a moment, but soon afterwards rolls into a humongous dog show building before the dogs quickly attack, bark at and seemingly maul Tom to death.

Finally, Jerry relaxes in the penthouse and drinks some juice but accidentally ends up swallowing a whole ice cube before he decides to lay back and relax.

== Crew ==
- Executive Producer: Walter Bien
- Story: Chuck Jones & Michael Maltese
- Animation: Ken Harris, Tom Ray, Dick Thompson, & Ben Washam
- Additional Animation: Don Towsley
- Backgrounds: Philip DeGuard
- Music: Eugene Poddany
- In Charge of Production: Les Goldman
- Co-Director & Layouts: Maurice Noble
- Vocal Effects: Mel Blanc
- Produced & Directed by Chuck Jones
