= The Year of the Mouse =

1965 animated short film by Chuck Jones

- Directed by: Chuck Jones; Maurice Noble
- Story by: Michael Maltese; Chuck Jones
- Produced by: Chuck Jones; Les Goldman
- Starring: Mel Blanc; June Foray
- Music by: Eugene Poddany
- Animation by: Dick Thompson; Ben Washam; Ken Harris; Don Towsley
- Color process: Metrocolor
- Production company: MGM Animation/Visual Arts
- Distributed by: Metro-Goldwyn-Mayer
- Release date: June 9, 1965
- Running time: 6:00
- Language: English

The Year of the Mouse is a 1965 animated comedy film featuring Tom and Jerry. It was directed and produced by Chuck Jones, with a story by Jones and Michael Maltese and animation by Dick Thompson, Ben Washam, Ken Harris, and Don Towsley.

In this film, Jerry Mouse and his fellow mouse Nipper torment a sleeping Tom Cat. They repeatedly attack him in his sleep, but Tom is left with the impression that these are incidents of self-harm. The attacks escalate in seriousness. Starting with a fly swatter, the mice proceed to use a revolver, a hangman's noose, a seemingly bloody knife, and a bow and arrow. Tom is increasingly scared, until he notices the mice spying on him. He takes revenge by tormenting them.

== Plot ==
Whilst Tom is sleeping, Jerry and Nipper, standing on a chimney top, decide to play mean tricks on Tom. Nipper uses a fishing line to lower Jerry to the bottom of the chimney. Jerry hits Tom with a fly swatter, leaving it in Tom's hand, and Nipper quickly reels him in, making Tom believe that he hit himself in his sleep. Tom goes back to sleep without thinking of it anymore.

Later, Jerry is lowered down the chimney holding a revolver. Jerry places the gun in Tom's hand while he's asleep and has a string tied to its trigger. As Jerry is reeled up, he pulls the string to the gun's trigger, firing the gun and waking Tom up, who is surprised to think he shot at himself in his sleep. Panicking at this, he attempts to get rid of the gun, setting it off and creating a long scar on his head. Unable to figure it out, he just goes back to sleep.

The mice then pull off their next trick. They drill a hole through the ceiling and lower a noose on Tom. Tom wakes up and looks around, getting the noose around his neck. Just as he goes back to sleep, the mice lower the other end of the rope onto Tom's hand, which he takes notice. He peers at the rope on the chandelier and then he tugs it extremely twice and it extremely pulls his neck. He quickly panics as he gets the noose off of his head, but after he gets it off, the chandelier unexpectedly unscrews itself from the ceiling and it falls right on top of Tom's head. Tom then gives a quick laugh before he faints and falls flat on his back.

The two mice prepare their next trick. As Tom is going back to sleep, the mice place a knife in his hands. Then Jerry opens a bottle of ketchup and pours some onto the end of the knife and then some onto Tom's chest. When Tom wakes up, he sees the stained knife in his hand and thinks that the knife is covered in blood, so he panics and leans against the wall. Then he clenches his chest and sees ketchup on his hand. Thinking that it's blood, he quickly concludes that he had stabbed himself in his sleep. Tom rushes into the bathroom and grabs a tourniquet, which he uses to tighten his neck. When he does, he inflates himself like a balloon and floats up onto the ceiling. As he does, he floats out of the bathroom and back in the living room where he notices the bottle of ketchup on the table. Then he tastes the ketchup on his chest and realizes it's a trick and starts laughing, but as he does, the tourniquet loosens and he starts to deflate, flying around the room until he lands on his pillow.

As Jerry makes fun of Tom's predicament, Nipper notices a bow and arrow on the ground. This time, they set Tom inside the bow as he is asleep. After Jerry signals Nipper to pull him back up, Tom wakes up and stretches, but this activates the bow. Confused, Tom sits up, and is then shot into the plumbing, and into the furnace. Tom yells and launches himself out of the furnace, up the water pipe, and down the chimney. Jerry and Nipper then look down the chimney to see the aftermath of their latest prank. Tom sees the two mice and realizes they have been the ones pulling pranks on him and they were behind all this. Tom grabs a gun and then points a gun at the two mice meaning that he has had enough of their tricks.

Later, Jerry and Nipper are trapped in a bottle with the revolver facing them. If they remove the cork to get out, it will pull a string to which the other end is tied to the trigger of the gun, and they would be killed or injured by the gunshot. Jerry and Nipper can only sit there and sulk furiously at their predicament while Tom, basking in unexpected victory, takes his peace and quiet nap, using his tail to cool himself off with a fan.

== Production notes ==
The Year of the Mouse is a remake of Jones' Oscar Nominated Mouse Wreckers with Claude Cat and Hubie and Bertie. This is one of the few shorts in which Tom wins against Jerry (given that the tables turned).
