= The Cookie Carnival =

1935 film by Ben Sharpsteen

- Directed by: Ben Sharpsteen
- Story by: Pinto Colvig; Ted Sears
- Produced by: Walt Disney
- Starring: Pinto Colvig; Shirley Reed
- Music by: Leigh Harline
- Animation by: Paul Allen; Johnny Cannon; Ugo D'Orsi; Nick George; Ferdinand Horvath; Jack Kinney; John McManus; Grim Natwick; Milt Schaffer; Leonard Sebring; Fred Spencer; Edward Strickland; Frank Thomas; Don Towsley; Bill Tytla
- Color process: Technicolor
- Production company: Walt Disney Productions
- Distributed by: United Artists
- Release date: May 25, 1935
- Running time: 8 minutes
- Country: United States
- Language: English

The Cookie Carnival is an animated short film produced by Walt Disney Productions and originally released as part of the Silly Symphonies series on May 25, 1935. It is a Cinderella story involving a cookie girl who wishes to be queen at the cookie carnival, and a homage to the Atlantic City boardwalk parade and bathing beauty contest (what eventually became the Miss America pageant) of the 1920s and 1930s. In accordance with the claim in Film Superlist: 1894-1939, the film is in the public domain as its copyright was not renewed. (Note: While there is a renewal in 1964 under R342441 it is for a Silly Symphonies book of the same name. As a work published in 1935, the cartoon had to be renewed by 1963 under the law at the time.) The depiction of "Miss Licorice" was left in the film despite being a racial stereotype. The film release in 1935 was at a time when there was less public awareness that these kinds of racial stereotypes were offensive to Black Americans. Walt Disney did not begin censoring offensive racial stereotypes until the late 1940s.

== Plot ==
The short.

Various sweets and goodies of Cookietown are preparing to crown their new cookie queen. A parade of potential candidates passes by, all based on various cakes and sweets. Far from the parade, on what would appear to be the wrong side of the peppermint stick railroad tracks, a hobo gingerbread man overhears a sugar cookie girl crying. Upon hearing that she can't enter the parade, because she doesn't have any clothes that are nice enough to wear for it, he hurries to remedy her situation by concocting a ballgown of cupcake wrappers, colored frosting, and candy hearts. He covers her brown hair with golden taffy ringlets and adds a large, violet bow to her dress as a finishing touch. Thus attired, she is entered as the final contestant in the parade: Ms. Bonbon.

The judges, who have thus far been disappointed in the candidates, all promptly declare Ms. Bonbon the cookie queen on sight. The gingerbread man is practically trampled in the sudden surge of the crowd as they carry Ms. Bonbon to her throne, where they place a golden crown on her head. Then she is presented with a large layer cake, which appears to be a carousel of different vaudeville acts. Every queen needs a king, so the newly crowned cookie queen has to choose a husband from those featured.

After being presented with a duet of tap-dancing candy cane kids, a pair of old-fashioned barbershop cookies, a pair of effeminate angel food cakes, two scat-singing devil food cakes, two acrobatic upside-down cakes, and three tipsy rum cookies, the queen refuses all of them with a giggle and a shake of her head. The judges, with no other suitors to present to her, offer her to marry one of them or all three of them.

At that moment, the gingerbread man, who has been attempting to gain a closer vantage point, sneaks up onto the dais. He is accosted by the guards who split his cupcake paper hat and tear off a piece of the red jelly roll carpet he was hiding under, so that he looks like he is wearing a crown and an ermine-lined cloak. The cookie queen, upon recognizing the gingerbread man, tells the guards to stop and declares him as her king. He is immediately released, and the new king takes his place beside his beloved sugar cookie queen while everyone celebrates. Their closing kiss melts the lollipop intended to screen them from view.

== Characters ==
- Hobo Cookie – voiced by Pinto Colvig: A good-natured wandering homeless gingerbread man who helps a gingerbread woman by giving her a makeover so she can enter the cookie carnival and ending up as the king of the carnival out of gratitude.
- Sugar Cookie Girl (aka Miss Bonbon) – voiced by Shirley Reed: A sad and poor gingerbread woman who wishes to participate in the cookie parade and gets a full makeover by a gingerbread man, ending up as the queen of the Cookie Carnival. In one of the comic adaptations, she is a real princess but decides to pass as a commoner to make sure her husband is good-natured.
- The Cookie Carnival Judges – a trio of male gingerbread cookies whose main job is to select the cookie queen in the cookie carnival and suggest her candidates for the title of king.
- Cookie Marching Band – the band that marches at the beginning of the cookie carnival.
- Cookie Armed Guard – a group of cookie soldiers who briefly antagonize the hobo cookie when the latter tries to get a better view of the vaudeville show.

The "Queen of the Cookie Carnival" Contestants

- Miss Peppermint: The first participant of the cookie carnival.
- Miss Coconut
- Miss Banana Cake
- Miss Strawberry Blonde
- Miss Peach (not pictured/possibly cut)
- Miss Licorice
- Miss Pineapple: One of the last participants of the cookie parade.
- Miss Orange Crush: The last participant of the parade before Miss Bonbon arrived at the last minute. She doesn't appear in the short, but her carriage is shown.
- Miss Jello (the title "Miss" suggests participation in the parade, but it is unclear as she appears after the Cookie Queen is crowned).

Candy Dates (Cookie King hopefuls)

- Dandy Candy Kids: A pair of young men made of candy canes.
- Old Fashioned Cookies: A pair of middle-aged cookies.
- Angel Food Cakes: A pair of effeminate cookie angels.
- Devils Food Cakes: A pair of devilish bullies who dance at the rhythm of Jazz and claim to be naughty but nice in order to win the cookie queen's heart. In the comics, one of them serves as the main antagonist to the protagonists.
- Upside Down Cakes: A pair of two cupcakes who are upside down.
- The Rum Cookies: A trio of drunken cookies who dance erratically.

== Production ==
Pinto Colvig, most known as the voice of Goofy, provides the voice of the gingerbread man. Vaudeville was dying out by the time The Cookie Carnival made its debut, but audiences would have been familiar with each of the acts represented by the different cookies.

When Miss Bonbon is being outfitted, she transitions from her cookie-like shape into a more humanoid-appearance (especially apparent between creating her dress and powdering her cheeks). This might make her another early example of visually realistic human characters in Disney shorts, and even a precursor to the Snow White look in Snow White and the Seven Dwarfs.

== Comic adaptation ==
The Silly Symphony Sunday comic strip ran a three-month-long adaptation of The Cookie Carnival called "Cookieland" from April 28 to July 21, 1935.

== Home media ==
The short was released on December 4, 2001 on Walt Disney Treasures: Silly Symphonies - The Historic Musical Animated Classics. Prior to that, the featurette also appeared on the Walt Disney Cartoon Classics Limited Gold Edition: Silly Symphonies VHS in the 1980s. Most recently, "The Cookie Carnival" was released as a segment in 2005's direct-to-video title Disney Princess: A Christmas of Enchantment.
