= List of Tom and Jerry Tales episodes =

The following is a list of episodes from the series Tom and Jerry Tales.

== Series overview ==
Season	Segments	Episodes	Originally released	
Season	Segments	Episodes	First released	Last released
1	39	13	September 23, 2006	May 5, 2007
2	39	13	September 22, 2007	March 22, 2008

== Episodes ==
=== Season 1 (2006–07) ===
No. overall	No. in season	Title	Directed by	Written by	Storyboard by	Original release date	Prod. code	K6–11 rating/share
1	1	"Tiger Cat"	Neal Sternecky	Charles Schneider	Kevin Frank	September 23, 2006	010	2.2/9
1	1	"Feeding Time"	Neal Sternecky	Eric Donald & Jim Gomez	Dave Bennett	September 23, 2006	010	2.2/9
1	1	"Polar Peril"	Neal Sternecky	Richard Pursel	Bob Foster	September 23, 2006	010	2.2/9
At a zoo, an artistic monkey paints Tom to look like a tiger after he accidentally wrecks his art during a chase against Jerry. As a result, Tom manages to scare Jerry as well as everyone else and every animal at the zoo with his tiger look. Tom works at a zoo run by Spike, who orders him to make sure nobody feeds the zoo's animals (only Spike can) or else he will have his badge. However, Jerry constantly feeds the animals to get Tom in trouble. At the North Pole, an overprotective polar bear defends Jerry from Tom and Butch.
2	2	"Joy Riding Jokers"	Douglas McCarthy	Charles Schneider	James Lopez	September 30, 2006	009	2.6/11
2	2	"Cat Got Your Luggage?"	Douglas McCarthy	Richard Pursel	Charles Visser	September 30, 2006	009	2.6/11
2	2	"City Dump Chumps"	Douglas McCarthy	Robert Ramirez	Norma Rivera Klingler	September 30, 2006	009	2.6/11
Spike and his girlfriend Toodles mistake Tom and Jerry for valets, as a result of which upon leaving their car to be parked while checking themselves in a hotel, Tom and Jerry unwillingly go on a wild and elaborate joyride across town. After accidentally trashing a fancy hotel lobby during another chase against Jerry, Tom is hired as a bellboy by the hotel's manager in order to pay for the damages. Unfortunately, Jerry makes Tom's assignments difficult. Tom and Butch fight over Jerry at a junkyard.
3	3	"Way-Off Broadway"	Tim Maltby	Eric Donald & Jim Gomez	Jennifer Coyle	October 7, 2006	008	2.2/9
3	3	"Egg Beats"	Tim Maltby	Eric Donald & Jim Gomez	Lyndon Ruddy	October 7, 2006	008	2.2/9
3	3	"Cry Uncle"	Tim Maltby	Matt Wayne	Julian Chaney & James C. Smith	October 7, 2006	008	2.2/9
In town, Tom and Jerry become street performers in order to get money. While listening to his favorite hip hop music, Jerry gets disrupted by the noise of the city, so he moves out of town to a farm owned by Tom. As a result, his music causes Tom's pet hen to lay eggs quickly. A sequel to Pecos Pest (1955), Jerry's uncle, Pecos Pest, returns to Tom and Jerry's house for a visit, where he constantly sings and plays on his guitar, annoying and keeping both Tom and Jerry awake.
4	4	"Bats What I Like About the South"	Tim Maltby	Robert Ramirez	Lyndon Ruddy	October 28, 2006	002	2.2/10
4	4	"Fraidycat Scat" (Note: This episode is officially called that in its title card and copyright listing.)	Tim Maltby	Charles Schneider	Jennifer Coyle	October 28, 2006	002	2.2/10
4	4	"Tomb It May Concern"	Tim Maltby	Story by : Charles Schneider; Teleplay by : Richard Pursel	Dan Kubat	October 28, 2006	002	2.2/10
At the woods and later a cemetery, Jerry disguises himself as a bat to scare Tom. Jerry pretends to be a skull by hiding inside of it and scaring Tom before they both got freaked out by an actual ghost. Tom and Jerry find gold inside a pyramid.
5	5	"Din-O-Sores"	Tim Maltby	Charles Schneider	Julian Chaney	November 4, 2006	011	2.3/10
5	5	"Freaky Tiki"	Tim Maltby	Charles Schneider	Jennifer Coyle	November 4, 2006	011	2.3/10
5	5	"Prehisterics"	Tim Maltby	Richard Pursel & Matt Wayne	Lyndon Ruddy	November 4, 2006	011	2.3/10
Tom and Jerry discover that their world is full of dinosaur eggs in prehistoric times. A mystical tiki casts a spell on Tom and Jerry. In prehistoric times, Tom and Jerry's ancestors outwit each other.
6	6	"Digital Dilemma"	Neal Sternecky	Tom Minton	Kevin Frank	November 11, 2006	004	1.9/8
6	6	"Hi, Robot"	Neal Sternecky	Matt Wayne	Dave Bennett	November 11, 2006	004	1.9/8
6	6	"Tomcat Jetpack"	Neal Sternecky	Robert Ramirez	Ken Boyer	November 11, 2006	004	1.9/8
Tom's makeshift computer traps him and Jerry in a virtual world. Tom makes a robotic girl mouse in order to catch Jerry. Tom dons an experimental flying suit after it falls out of a mail truck.
7	7	"Fire Breathing Tom Cat"	Douglas McCarthy	Story by : Earl Kress & Richard Pursel; Teleplay by : Earl Kress	David M. Stephan	February 3, 2007	003	N/A
7	7	"Medieval Menace"	Douglas McCarthy	Robert Ramirez	Norma Rivera Klingler	February 3, 2007	003	N/A
7	7	"The Itch"	Douglas McCarthy	Story by : Joseph Barbera & Matt Wayne; Teleplay by : Matt Wayne	Charles Visser	February 3, 2007	003	N/A
A king sends Tom to slay a dragon. Tom chases Jerry throughout a castle. Jerry wants to join a band of rats, whose music causes everyone to itch.
8	8	"Ho Ho Horrors"	Neal Sternecky	Story by : Richard Pursel; Teleplay by : Eric Donald & Jim Gomez	Dave Bennett	February 10, 2007	001	2.4/9
8	8	"Doggone Hill Hog"	Neal Sternecky	Richard Pursel	Kevin Frank	February 10, 2007	001	2.4/9
8	8	"Northern Light Fish Fight"	Neal Sternecky	Story by : Richard Pursel; Teleplay by : Charles Schneider	Ken Boyer & Kirk Hansen	February 10, 2007	001	2.4/9
On Christmas Eve, Jerry enters Tom's dream and turns it into a nightmare, resulting in both of them trashing their entire house in their sleep. Spike shows off his sledding skills to Tom and Jerry. Tom chases Jerry to steal his fish at the North Pole.
9	9	"Cat Nebula"	Douglas McCarthy	Robert Ramirez	Norma Rivera Klingler	February 17, 2007	006	2.3/10
9	9	"Martian Mice"	Douglas McCarthy	Meredith Jennings-Offen	Norma Rivera Klingler	February 17, 2007	006	2.3/10
9	9	"Spaced Out Cat"	Douglas McCarthy	Eric Donald & Jim Gomez	David M. Stephen	February 17, 2007	006	2.3/10
Set in outer space sometime in the future, Jerry is captain of a mouse-run freighter (Tuffy) while Tom is a green-skinned alien. At a farm, giant-sized mice from Mars accidentally abducted Tom and Jerry. Tom attempts to win Toodles back from Spike by building a spaceship and being the first one to get to the moon alongside Jerry.
10	10	"Octo Suave"	Neal Sternecky	Richard Pursel	Kevin Frank & Neal Sternecky	February 24, 2007	007	2.4/10
10	10	"Beach Bully Bingo"	Neal Sternecky	Richard Pursel	Bob Foster & Neal Sternecky	February 24, 2007	007	2.4/10
10	10	"Treasure Map Scrap"	Neal Sternecky	Eric Donald & Jim Gomez	Dave Bennett	February 24, 2007	007	2.4/10
An octopus accidentally mistakes Tom for a mermaid. While Tom and Jerry are relaxing at the beach Bingo, Spike and Butch surf-fight. Tom and Jerry attempt to find treasure under the sea.
11	11	"Destruction Junction"	Douglas McCarthy	Charles Schneider	Charles Visser	March 3, 2007	012	2.0/8
11	11	"Battle of the Power Tools"	Douglas McCarthy	Bradley Zweig	Brian Mitchell & Charles Visser	March 3, 2007	012	2.0/8
11	11	"Jackhammered Cat"	Douglas McCarthy	Earl Kress	Norma Rivera Klingler	March 3, 2007	012	2.0/8
Spike is put in charge of the rest of a building's construction while the crew are hospitalized after suffering an extreme case of splinters. Formerly poor, Tom and Jerry become rich overnight shortly after their numbers come in, so they split their millions and each set out to build a mansion across from each other. Tom and Jerry stumble into a feast guarded by Spike at a construction site, where neither the former two are invited.
12	12	"Tin Cat of Tomorrow"	Neal Sternecky	Earl Kress	Dave Bennett	April 28, 2007	013	2.1/9
12	12	"Beefcake Tom"	Neal Sternecky	Mark Turosz	Bob Foster & Charles Visser	April 28, 2007	013	2.1/9
12	12	"Tomcat Superstar"	Neal Sternecky	Richard Pursel	Kevin Frank	April 28, 2007	013	2.1/9
Inspired by Push-Button Kitty (1952), Mrs. Two-Shoes, after being fed up with Tom failing to catch Jerry, orders a robotic cat to replace Tom. Tom enrolls at a gym after being unable to catch Jerry due to his obesity. Tom quits show business and retires to a farm.
13	13	"Piranha Be Loved by You"	Tim Maltby	Meredith Jennings-Offen	Lyndon Ruddy	May 5, 2007	005	2.0/9
13	13	"Spook House Mouse"	Tim Maltby	Story by : Charles Schneider; Teleplay by : Richard Pursel	Julian Chaney & Dan Kubat	May 5, 2007	005	2.0/9
13	13	"Abracadumb"	Tim Maltby	Charles Schneider	Jennifer Coyle	May 5, 2007	005	2.0/9
At an amusement park, a piranha makes it hard for Tom to win Toodles' affection. At an amusement park, Tom and Jerry's antics lead them into a horror house where they get scared white as ghosts. Tom and Jerry engage in a magic duel.

=== Season 2 (2007–08) ===
No. overall	No. in season	Title	Directed by	Written by	Storyboard by	Original release date	Prod. code	K6–11 rating/share
14	1	"More Powers to You"	TJ House	Christopher Painter	Nondas Korodimos & TJ House	September 22, 2007	015	1.8/8
14	1	"Catch Me Though You Can't"	TJ House	Joe Purdy	Kevin Frank	September 22, 2007	015	1.8/8
14	1	"Power Tom"	TJ House	Charles Schneider	Neal Sternecky	September 22, 2007	015	1.8/8
Tom is tasked in guarding the power rings owned by a team of superheroes from supervillain Doom Dog (Spike). However, he and Jerry torment each other with the power rings, while Doom Dog sneaks into the headquarters unnoticed. A scientist accidentally zaps Jerry with a speed ray, making him faster than ever. As a result, Tom is unable to catch Jerry. Tom and Jerry fall into a garden hole, where they find the basement headquarters of a superheroine.
15	2	"Zent Out of Shape"	Tim Maltby	Christopher Painter	Dave Bennett	September 29, 2007	014B	1.8/8
15	2	"I Dream of Meanie"	Tim Maltby	Christopher Painter	Marcus Williams	September 29, 2007	014A	1.8/8
15	2	"Which Witch"	Tim Maltby	Tom Minton	Julian Chaney	September 29, 2007	014C	1.8/8
Zen Buddhist monk Tom attempts to achieve inner peace in Japan, only to be disturbed by Jerry attempting to blast music. As a genie, Spike must grant Tom and Jerry wishes. Tom is forced to obtain Jerry for a witch's potion.
16	3	"Don't Bring Your Pet to School Day"	Spike Brandt & Tony Cervone	Spike Brandt & Tony Cervone	Spike Brandt & Tony Cervone (Uncredited)	October 6, 2007	016	1.6/7
16	3	"Cat Show Catastrophe"	Spike Brandt & Tony Cervone	Spike Brandt & Tony Cervone	Spike Brandt & Tony Cervone (Uncredited)	October 6, 2007	016	1.6/7
16	3	"The Cat Whisperer with Casper Lombardo"	Spike Brandt & Tony Cervone	Spike Brandt & Tony Cervone	Spike Brandt & Tony Cervone (Uncredited)	October 6, 2007	016	1.6/7
Nancy, Tom's owner from Baby Puss (1943), brings him to her elementary school for a show-and-tell in which she wants Tom to win the gold star for being the best pet. Jerry and his nappy-wearing friend, Tuffy, attempt to ruin Tom's chances at a cat show. Tom's owner hires a trainer to make him behave well after causing chaos around the house while attempting to catch Jerry.
17	4	"Adventures in Penguin Sitting"	Tim Maltby	Robert Ramirez	Dave Bennett	October 13, 2007	017	2.1/9
17	4	"Cat of Prey"	Tim Maltby	Tom Minton	Julian Chaney	October 13, 2007	017	2.1/9
17	4	"Jungle Love"	Tim Maltby	Robert Ramirez	Lyndon Ruddy	October 13, 2007	017	2.1/9
Jerry and an escaped penguin from the zoo, become friends. When his penguin starves, he gives him ice popsicles until Tom cause chaos in the house to mess with Jerry's pet. Tom seeks to catch and eat Jerry, the star of the show at an animal park (based on Sea World) along with a bald eagle, but he is then thwarted by another eagle, a sea lion and an octopus. Jerry makes friends with a baby rhinoceros, while Tom becomes Tarzan. While a snake falls in love with Tom’s tail, believing it to be a female snake.
18	5	"Invasion of the Body Slammers"	TJ House	Christopher Painter	Neal Sternacky, Nondas Korodimos & Akis Dimitrakopoulos	October 27, 2007	018C	N/A
18	5	"Monster Con"	TJ House	Brad Birch	Andy Suriano & Marcus Williams	October 27, 2007	018B	N/A
18	5	"Over the River and Boo the Woods"	TJ House	Joe Purdy	Kevin Frank & Mary Hanley	October 27, 2007	018A	N/A
A green shapeshifter emerges from an alien spaceship that lands near Tom and Jerry's home. There, it morphs into Jerry and befriends him while proceeding to make a living nightmare for Tom. Tom uses some of Abraham Van Helsing's equipment to catch Jerry, but catches a few ghosts instead. While on a fishing trip, Tom and Jerry end up in a haunted forest. There, they encounter Butch, who has gathered bat wings. He tells them that they'll be trapped forever unless one of them can make it out alive first.
19	6	"Xtreme Trouble"	Spike Brandt & Tony Cervone	Spike Brandt & Tony Cervone	Spike Brandt & Tony Cervone (Uncredited)	November 3, 2007	019B	2.1/9
19	6	"A Life Less Guarded"	Spike Brandt & Tony Cervone	Spike Brandt & Tony Cervone	Spike Brandt & Tony Cervone (Uncredited)	November 3, 2007	019C	2.1/9
19	6	"Sasquashed"	Spike Brandt & Tony Cervone	Spike Brandt & Tony Cervone	Spike Brandt & Tony Cervone (Uncredited)	November 3, 2007	019A	2.1/9
Tom and Jerry begin their usual chases using extreme sports equipment – from skateboarding to rollerskating. Tom competes against Droopy for the role of a lifeguard at the local pool owned by Miss Shapely. Note: The lifeguard is a caricature of Tex Avery, and Miss Shapely is based on Red from Red Hot Riding Hood. While on a camping trip, Tom, Jerry, and Tuffy encounter Bigfoot.
20	7	"Summer Squashing"	Tim Maltby	Christopher Keenan	Dave Bennett	November 10, 2007	020A	1.7/6
20	7	"League of Cats"	Tim Maltby	Richard Pursel	Lyndon Ruddy	November 10, 2007	020C	1.7/6
20	7	"Little Big Mouse"	Tim Maltby	Christopher Keenan	Julian Chaney	November 10, 2007	020B	1.7/6
Tom is assigned to guard his owner's garden of crops against pests, including Jerry, and a clan of harvest mice who all resemble him (albeit with different-colored bandanas). Upon seeing Tom unable to catch Jerry, Butch recruits the former to join the League of Cats, a secret organization of cats who work together to catch mice. While Tom and Mrs. Two-Shoes are sleeping by the refrigerator during an intensive heat wave, Jerry steals all the food for a picnic in the backyard to which Tom takes the blame for the thefts and gets kicked out into the backyard. Nevertheless, Jerry's attempts at a peaceful picnic is undermined by an ant whom Tom helped earlier.
21	8	"Bend It Like Thomas"	TJ House	Tom Minton	Neal Sternecky	December 1, 2007	021B	1.7/7
21	8	"Endless Bummer"	TJ House	Richard Pursel	Nondas Korodimos	December 1, 2007	021C	1.7/7
21	8	"Game Set Match"	TJ House	Eric Shaw	Kevin Frank	December 1, 2007	021A	1.7/7
Tom torments Jerry and Spike with his soccer skills. Tom, Jerry, and Droopy compete in a surfing competition. In the backyard, Spike forces an unwilling Tom to teach his son Tyke how to play tennis, with disastrous results.
22	9	"The Declaration of Independunce"	Spike Brandt & Tony Cervone	Spike Brandt & Tony Cervone	Spike Brandt & Tony Cervone (Uncredited)	December 8, 2007	022	1.9/8
22	9	"Kitty Hawked"	Spike Brandt & Tony Cervone	Spike Brandt & Tony Cervone	Spike Brandt & Tony Cervone (Uncredited)	December 8, 2007	022	1.9/8
22	9	"24 Karat Kat"	Spike Brandt & Tony Cervone	Spike Brandt & Tony Cervone	Spike Brandt & Tony Cervone (Uncredited)	December 8, 2007	022	1.9/8
Tom loses his Declaration of Independence when he makes it into a paper airplane, and thus sets out to retrieve it. Now an elderly museum tour guide, Jerry talks about his part in the Wright brothers' aerial experiments. Tom and Butch are bandits in the 19th century at a Sutter's Mill, scheming to steal gold from Jerry's claim. At the end, Spike helps Jerry out to collect all of the real gold, which sends Tom and Butch to jail.
23	10	"Hockey Schtick"	Tim Maltby	Jim Gomez	Julian Chaney	February 2, 2008	023C	1.6/9
23	10	"Snow Brawl"	Tim Maltby	Christopher Painter	Dave Bennett	February 2, 2008	023A	1.6/9
23	10	"Snow Mouse"	Tim Maltby	Charles Schneider	Lyndon Ruddy	February 2, 2008	023B	1.6/9
Jerry decides to freeze the pond and go figure skating, only to be thwarted by Tom playing hockey. Jerry engages Tom in a snowball fight. Tom and Jerry encounter a gigantic abominable snow mouse that wants to eat them.
24	11	"DJ Jerry"	TJ House	Richard Pursel	Akis Dimitrakopoulos & Garrett O'Donoghue	February 9, 2008	024C	N/A
24	11	"Kitty Cat Blues"	TJ House	TJ House	TJ House, Warren Leonhardt & Neal Sternecky	February 9, 2008	024A	N/A
24	11	"Flamenco Fiasco"	TJ House	Christopher Painter	Neal Sternecky	February 9, 2008	024B	N/A
Tom is in charge of guarding his owner's record store, but has trouble doing that, so thanks to a rap club for rodents run by Jerry. Tom tries to woo Sherkie by giving Jerry to her as a gift. He also sings a new song to her. Notes: Sylvester the Cat from Looney Tunes briefly makes a cameo appearance on one of the posters of Sherkie. In this short, Tom is drawn in his early 1940s-era design as opposed to his normal modern design, as a callback to The Zoot Cat on which this episode was based on. Jerry and his girlfriend enter a flamenco dance contest against Tom and Toodles, resulting in the four of them ruining the entire contest.
25	12	"You're Lion"	Spike Brandt & Tony Cervone	Eric Jacobson, Spike Brandt & Tony Cervone	Spike Brandt & Tony Cervone (Uncredited)	March 8, 2008	025	1.6/6
25	12	"Kangadoofus"	Spike Brandt & Tony Cervone	Spike Brandt & Tony Cervone	Spike Brandt & Tony Cervone (Uncredited)	March 8, 2008	025	1.6/6
25	12	"Monkey Chow"	Spike Brandt & Tony Cervone	Spike Brandt & Tony Cervone	Spike Brandt & Tony Cervone (Uncredited)	March 8, 2008	025	1.6/6
Tom visits the African veldt to give Jerry as a present to his lion relatives, but the lions would rather eat both of them. In the Australian Outback, Jerry takes refuge from Tom when he is adopted by an overprotective mother kangaroo and her two joeys, who greatly resemble Jerry minus the tails. While Tom and his owner are touring an exotic monkey garden in Malaysia, Jerry lets loose from a monkey.
26	13	"Game of Mouse & Cat"	Frank Molieri	Christopher Painter	Julian Chaney & Frank Molieri	March 22, 2008	026C	0.8/4
26	13	"Babysitting Blues"	Tim Maltby	Richard Pursel	Dave Bennett	March 22, 2008	026B	0.8/4
26	13	"Catfish Follies"	Tim Maltby	Richard Pursel	Lyndon Ruddy & Hyunsook Cho	March 22, 2008	026A	0.8/4
At a laboratory, Jerry, using a virtual reality setup, plays a game in which Tom is hated by Mrs. Two-Shoes (while she likes Jerry) and is scared of Jerry. When Tom arrives at the laboratory, he plays a game in which Spike is scared of him (albeit still talking while Tom still doesn't). Note: This is another short in which Tom is drawn in his early 1940s-era design. Tom and Jerry babysit their nephews, which prove too much for the both of them. While on a fishing trip, Tom and Jerry discover Butch, a catfish who wants to eat Jerry, while Tom wants to eat Butch.
