= Dog Tired =

1942 film by Charles M. Jones

- Title card
- Directed by: Charles M. Jones
- Story by: Rich Hogan (uncredited)
- Produced by: Leon Schlesinger
- Starring: Mel Blanc; Pinto Colvig
- Music by: Carl W. Stalling
- Animation by: Phil Monroe
- Color process: Technicolor
- Production company: Leon Schlesinger Productions
- Distributed by: Warner Bros. Pictures
- Release date: April 25, 1942
- Running time: 7 min
- Country: United States
- Language: English

Dog Tired is a 1942 American animated comedy short film directed by Charles M. Jones. It was released on April 25, 1942. It is part of the Merrie Melodies series and the sixth and final cartoon to star the Two Curious Puppies, who were retired as Jones pivoted to directing more comedic cartoons; it is their only cartoon to not be reissued.

== Plot ==
The two puppies jump into a zoo to avoid being run over in a pit. The smaller puppy lands in a fountain. He interrupts lovebirds who are flirting. The larger puppy lands in a kangaroo who roams the zoo grounds and proceeds to bounce like her. He is mocked by a laughing hyena and horrified by a lion. He finds an orangutan on the tree he is on and lands on a porcupine.

The smaller puppy finds a bone and buries it, only to have it stolen by an ostrich. He fights with a tortoise who takes it, only to miss it while running into and leaving a hippo. The larger puppy lands at the kangaroo's pouch again before landing inside a pelican. The smaller puppy gets the bone and runs off the hippo like a ramp, injuring the lion, stork and pelican. He runs into the larger puppy, both of which land in the kangaroo with the laughing hyena, who takes their bone and embraces them humorously.
