= The Bear That Wasn't =

1946 children's book by Frank Tashlin

- Cover of the first edition of the book
- Author: Frank Tashlin
- Illustrator: Frank Tashlin
- Language: English
- Genre: Children's literature, satire
- Publisher: E. P. Dutton
- Publication date: 1946
- Publication place: United States

The Bear That Wasn't is a 1946 children's picture book written and illustrated by filmmaker and Looney Tunes alumnus Frank Tashlin.

== Synopsis ==
A bear settles down for his hibernation and while he sleeps, the progress of man continues. He wakes up to find himself in the middle of a gigantic factory, where he gets mistaken by the foreman for a worker and thus is ordered to get to work. When the bear responds that he doesn't work there, and that he's is a bear and not a human, the foreman laughs and denounces him as merely being a "silly man who needs a shave and wears a fur coat", and takes the bear to each of his successive bosses (general manager and a trio of vice-presidents, all of whom tell him their own version of the same claim), reaching all the way up to the elderly president of the factory, who concludes he cannot be a bear because "bears are only in a zoo or a circus; they're never inside a factory." To prove that he's not a bear, the bosses take him to a zoo, where the zoo bears themselves also think he's not a bear on account that he would be in the cage with them otherwise. Next they take him to a circus where the bears here think the same thing on account that if he was a bear, he would be riding a bicycle and wearing a hat with them otherwise. Both locations have the youngest bears also say, "He's a silly man who needs a shave and wears a fur coat!" With his hopes seemingly dashed, the bear concludes that he is indeed a "silly man" and promptly buckles down to work hard at the factory – much to the satisfaction of the foreman and the other bosses, all of whom shake hands happily as the bear works.

Months later, the factory closes down and the bear finds himself turned out of doors in the cold snow, wishing that he were a bear. For a while, he just sits there, unsure of what to do, due to being torn between what he has been told so far. Finally, he discards the trappings of his human existence, seeks out a cave to hibernate, which he enters feeling comfortable and bear-like once more, because he had finally realized that even though the foreman, the bosses and even the zoo bears had told him he was a "silly man", that did not necessarily mean it was really true (in fact, the narrator even asks the readers in the book version if they think he actually believed it). The narrator concludes that he "wasn't a silly man, or a silly bear, either".

== Themes ==
At National Public Radio, Daniel Pinkwater opined that, although appearing as a children's book, the story is a critical satire towards aspects of society. It revolves around the concept of people believing a repeated idea even though it may not be true. People have a tendency to shift their views if a concept is hammered into them over and over again, like the bear being told he is a "silly man who needs a shave and wears a fur coat". The bear eventually succumbs to this mistaken assumption, believing he is a man even though he had previously known otherwise, just as humans shift their views on a topic because of repetitive information, or because "they all say it is true, therefore it must be". Yet, in the end, the bear, who is cold in winter, reverts to what he really is – a bear – and finds shelter in a cave. This idea covers the concept of people never changing due to outside influence. Though people may change for someone else, when placed in a difficult position, they revert to old habits – just like the bear hibernating. Whether something is fact or fiction, it is what it is and does not change – no matter how many people believe otherwise, hence that "he wasn't a silly man. And he wasn't a silly bear, either."

The book also presents a visual satire of corporate culture. Each time the bear appears before a higher-ranking man in the corporation, the offices get progressively more elaborate, for example, progressively more phones, more waste-baskets, more secretaries, all according to rank (the secretaries in particular melodically tell the bear and bosses to "come in" in the animated version). There are also progressively more chins and less hair on each higher-ranking person as the bear ascends all the way to the president's office.

== Adaptations ==
An audio version was issued by MGM Records in 1947, narrated by Keenan Wynn.

In 1967, Tashlin's former Warner Bros. Cartoons colleague Chuck Jones directed an animated short film based on the book for Metro-Goldwyn-Mayer.

== Influence ==
Tashlin's book inspired Swiss writer Jörg Steiner to create his children's book Der Bär, der ein Bär bleiben wollte (1976; German: "The Bear Who Wanted to Stay a Bear"), which was translated into English and published by Atheneum Books the next year as The Bear Who Wanted to Be a Bear, whose cover states "From an idea by Frank Tashlin".

A Belgian singer has also adopted the moniker "The Bear That Wasn't" for recording and released an album entitled And So It Is Morning Dew in 2010. The German book Der Bär, der ein Bär bleiben wollte on the other hand inspired German singer-songwriter Reinhard Mey to write a song of that name, appearing on his 1978 album Unterwegs.

== Book information ==
- New York, E.P. Dutton & co., inc., 1946 (1st edition), LCCN 46001683
- New York, Dover Publications [1962, c1946], LCCN 62004936
- New York : Dover Publications, 1995, ISBN 0-486-28787-4
- New York : The New York Review Children's Collection, 2010, ISBN 978-1-59017-344-2
