= The Cat Above and the Mouse Below =

1964 film

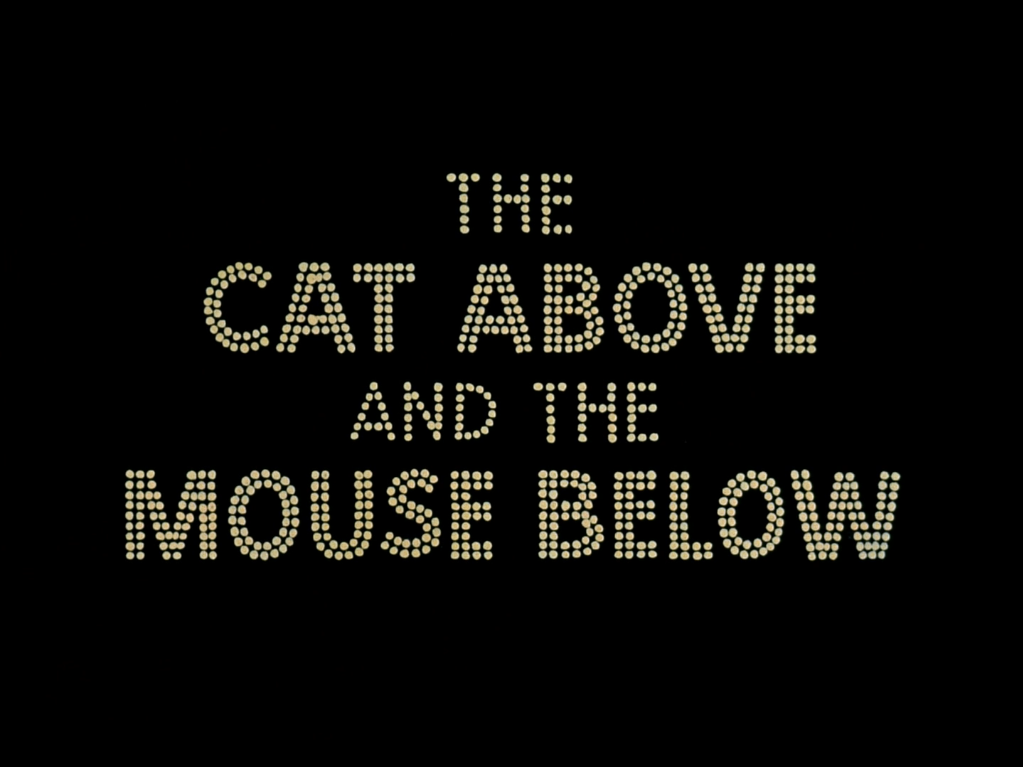
- Directed by: Chuck Jones; Maurice Noble
- Story by: Michael Maltese; Chuck Jones
- Produced by: Chuck Jones; Les Goldman
- Starring: Terence Monck
- Music by: Eugene Poddany
- Animation by: Tom Ray; Dick Thompson; Ben Washam; Ken Harris; Don Towsley
- Backgrounds by: Philip DeGuard
- Production company: Sib Tower 12 Productions
- Distributed by: Metro-Goldwyn-Mayer
- Release date: February 25, 1964
- Running time: 6:27
- Languages: English; Italian

The Cat Above and the Mouse Below is the second of thirty-four Tom and Jerry shorts produced by Chuck Jones, released in 1964. It was directed by Jones, co-directed by Maurice Noble, and is the second short written by Michael Maltese.

== Plot ==
Tom is a famous singer announced as "Signor Thomasino Catti-Cazzaza Baritone", who will perform at a concert to sing "Largo al factotum" from The Barber of Seville. Tom arrives in a very long limousine, and emerges, tossing a rose into a frenzied crowd. He walks on stage to applause, which he interrupts with a simple hand gesture, and begins to sing for the audience watching. While all of this is taking place, down below the stage, Jerry is trying to sleep but is awakened by Tom's operatic tones.

Jerry tries to gesture for Tom to stop, by banging on the stage with a toothbrush but in return Tom, while singing, stomps on the floor enough to get Jerry to shake and bounce around his "room". Enraged, Jerry uses a hammer to pound a floorboard, shooting Tom out of his tuxedo into the air, from where he falls back into it, but upside down, and legs through sleeves. Tom tiptoes offstage to change back to normal.

Next, Tom sings again, this time, stomping the floor while performing, much harder than before, creating a huge rumble in Jerry's house, eventually causing Jerry's bed to collapse on top of him. Jerry thinks it's war and decides to get revenge. Tom continues the performance and Jerry holds up a sign through the vent onstage that has "PSST" written on it. Tom continues singing as he pokes his head in, and Jerry snaps his lips closed in a pucker with a doubled rubber band. In retaliation, Tom uses the rubber band to shoot a long staple into the vent, which shoots down, ricochets several times, and then whisks Jerry right out of his nightshirt, and pins him up on the wall by his neck. Jerry crosses his arms, one leg over the other, and then "taps" his foot midair, looking exceedingly annoyed.

As Tom sings in the middle of his performance, Jerry manages to get free from the staple and at the side of the stage licks a lemon so Tom gets sour by the thought of the scene, and salivating, his lips pucker and shrink. Frustrated, he goes to Jerry and while continuing to sing, juices the lemon on Jerry's head. Tom returns to the spotlight. Jerry then drills a hole in the floor In between Tom’s feet and uses a hooked wire to pull the bottom of Tom's cummerbund apart, causing it to spring up and whap him in the face. Tom grabs the wire and yanks it up and down banging Jerry's head on the board until Jerry thinks to let it go. While Tom is singing the "Figaro!" part, Jerry aims a plunger at Tom's mouth and scores a direct hit. Jerry imitates Tom mockingly, but then Tom sticks him to the floor with the plunger. Using Jerry's bow, he shoots Jerry in the plunger onto a wall offstage and resumes his singing.

Jerry frees himself and accidentally drops a huge sandbag on Tom as he is reaching the climax, causing him to get knocked through the floor with a loud crash. Everything is mostly silent up until Jerry walks onto the stage in a tuxedo. Now the mouse is above, and the cat is stuck below, with his head flattened by the sandbag hit, and Jerry sings the last section of the performance himself (albeit in a high-pitched voice). An infuriated (and obviously upstaged) Tom raps on the floor with a broom and sends Jerry flying, but this just adds to the sensational mouse's drama singing the final few notes, as he makes a graceful balletic landing before receiving loud applause. The words "The End" then appear on the close curtains.

== Crew ==
- Story: Michael Maltese & Chuck Jones
- Animation: Tom Ray, Dick Thompson, Ben Washam, Ken Harris, & Don Towsley.
- Backgrounds: Philip DeGuard
- In Charge of Production: Les Goldman
- Co-Director & Layouts: Maurice Noble
- Music: Eugene Poddany
- Baritone: Terence Monck
- Produced & Directed by Chuck Jones
