= The Mansion Cat =

2001 film

- Title card
- Written by: Karl Toerge
- Directed by: Karl Toerge
- Starring: Joseph Barbera
- Music by: J. Eric Schmidt
- Original language: English

Production
- Producer: Diana Ritchey
- Running time: 7:00
- Production companies: Hanna-Barbera; Turner Entertainment Co.

Original release
- Network: Boomerang
- Release: April 8, 2001

The Mansion Cat is a 2001 American made-for-television animated short film featuring the cat and mouse duo Tom and Jerry. It is the first entry in the original Tom and Jerry series of shorts in the 34 years since Purr-Chance to Dream in 1967 and the 162nd overall. It is also the first short involving William Hanna and Joseph Barbera in the 43 years since Tot Watchers in 1958. Produced by Hanna-Barbera Cartoons in association with Turner Entertainment Co., it is the first Tom and Jerry cartoon released by Warner Bros. Entertainment Inc. since the 1996 Time Warner-Turner merger.

== Plot ==
The cartoon opens with a circle showing Jerry running, but as the circle grows, it is revealed that Jerry is going nowhere, as Tom captured his tail. When Tom's owner (voiced by Joseph Barbera, Tom and Jerry co-creator and Hanna-Barbera co-founder) calls Tom, he lets Jerry go, freeing him back into his cage. The owner of Tom and a large mansion tells Tom that he is going away for a while, that the mansion is in perfect shape and that he does not want Tom blaming the mouse (Jerry) for any destruction this time. Of course, this means Tom will spend most of the cartoon chasing Jerry across the mansion, causing extensive damage.

First, Tom kicks Jerry out of the mansion, sits on the sofa and eats much food stolen from the refrigerator while watching television (A clip of Muscle Beach Tom is shown). Afterwards, traditional chase and damage happen. Among the sequences include Jerry shoving Tom into a VCR and shelving the resulting cassette-sized cat, Tom trapping Jerry in a coffeemaker, Jerry trapping Tom in a refrigerator, Jerry sucking Tom and half the living room into a vacuum cleaner and finally Tom chasing Jerry through the yard and into the house on a riding lawnmower; the cartoon ends with Tom accidentally crashing the lawnmower into the returning car of his owner, who then tells Tom that he "makes a better hood ornament than a house cat".

== Broadcast history ==
The Mansion Cat premiered on Boomerang on April 8, 2001, making it the only Tom and Jerry short made specifically for Boomerang. It later premiered on Cartoon Network as part of the "Tom and Jerry Slamfest" marathon on May 28, 2001. In addition, this was one of the last cartoons produced by Hanna-Barbera before its absorption into Warner Bros. Animation on March 12, 2001, and William Hanna's death of throat cancer on March 22, 2001, several days before the short premiered. It was also the first Tom and Jerry short to use digital ink-and-paint.

Seven months later, the short premiered on The WB as part of its Kids' WB block in November 2001. Despite being a TV short, in regions like Latin America, it premiered in theaters alongside The Powerpuff Girls Movie.

== Voice cast ==
- Joseph Barbera as Tom, Owner

== See also ==
- Tom and Jerry filmography
- List of works produced by Hanna-Barbera Productions
