= The Phantom Tollbooth (film) =

1970 fantasy film

- Theatrical release poster
- Directed by: Chuck Jones; Abe Levitow; Dave Monahan (live action)
- Screenplay by: Chuck Jones; Sam Rosen
- Based on: The Phantom Tollbooth; 1961 novel by Norton Juster
- Produced by: Chuck Jones
- Starring: Butch Patrick; Mel Blanc; Daws Butler; Candy Candido; Hans Conried; June Foray; Patti Gilbert; Shepard Menken; Cliff Norton; Larry Thor; Les Tremayne
- Cinematography: Lester Shorr
- Edited by: Jim Faris
- Music by: Dean Elliott
- Production company: MGM Animation/Visual Arts
- Distributed by: Metro-Goldwyn-Mayer
- Release date: November 7, 1970
- Running time: 89 minutes
- Country: United States
- Language: English

The Phantom Tollbooth (also known as The Adventures of Milo in the Phantom Tollbooth) is a 1970 American live-action/animated fantasy film based on Norton Juster's 1961 children's book of the same name. Produced by Chuck Jones at MGM Animation/Visual Arts, the film stars Butch Patrick as Milo, alongside the voice talents of Mel Blanc, Daws Butler, Candy Candido, Hans Conried, June Foray, Patti Gilbert, Shepard Menken, Cliff Norton, Larry Thor, and Les Tremayne. Jones also co-directed the film with Abe Levitow, while Dave Monahan directed the live-action segments.

Completed in 1968, the film was held up from release by MGM until late 1970 due to internal studio problems. The animation studio closed soon after the film's release, with MGM having no further involvement in the animation business until 1993 with the startup of their new Metro-Goldwyn-Mayer Animation studio. Upon release, The Phantom Tollbooth received positive reviews but was a box-office disappointment.

== Plot ==
Milo is a bored boy who lives in a San Francisco apartment block and suffers from feelings of apathy. One day while telling his friend over the phone that there's "no rhyme or reason" in his life, he is surprised by a large, gift-wrapped package that appears in his room. He opens it and discovers a tollbooth which is a gateway to the enchanted Kingdom of Wisdom in the Lands Beyond.

As Milo uses the tollbooth's toy car and pays the toll with coins, the movie moves from live action to animation (which requires some getting accustomed to). Accompanied by Tock, a "watchdog" who actually has a large pocket watch in his body, Milo has a series of adventures in places like the Doldrums, Dictionopolis (Kingdom of Words), Digitopolis (Kingdom of Mathematics), the Mountains of Ignorance, and the Castle in the Air. Together, they must rescue the Princesses of Sweet Rhyme and Pure Reason, who are being held captive in the Castle in the Air, and restore order to the Kingdom of Wisdom.

The many eccentric characters they meet include the Whether Man, the Humbug, the Spelling Bee, the noisy Dr. Kakofonous A. Dischord, King Azaz the Unabridged, the Mathemagician, Faintly Macabre the Not-So-Wicked Which, Chroma the Great, and Officer Short Shrift as well as demons like the Senses Taker, the Terrible Trivium, the Demon of Insincerity, and the Gelatinous Giant. In all of the places he visits he finds a new friend to guide him on his mission to Rhyme and Reason. After Milo defeats all the demons the princesses are freed, and the victory of Rhyme and Reason is celebrated.

Milo is suddenly returned home, the tollbooth closes up and flies away, and Milo finds out from his friend on the phone that he's only been away for five minutes. He is about to inquire further when his friend says he has to go, as there is a giant gift box in his room...

The film ends with a song about Milo finding things to do and being happy within the real world and shows him smiling while playing at a playground.

== Cast ==
- Butch Patrick as Milo

=== Voices ===
- Mel Blanc as Officer Short Shrift, The Dodecahedron, The Demon of Insincerity, The Letter Vendor, Ministers, Lethargians, The Overbearing Know-It-All
- Daws Butler as The Whether Man, The Senses Taker, The Terrible Trivium, The Gelatinous Giant
- Candy Candido as The Awful DYNNE
- Hans Conried as King Azaz the Unabridged, The Mathemagician
- June Foray as Ralph, The Princess of Pure Reason, Faintly Macabre the Not-So-Wicked Which
- Patti Gilbert as The Princess of Sweet Rhyme
- Shepard Menken as The Spelling Bee, Chroma the Great
- Cliff Norton as Dr. Kakofonous A. Dischord, Tollbooth Speaker Voice
- Larry Thor as Tock
- Les Tremayne as The Humbug, The Poetic Words Vendor

== Production ==
In 1963, Metro-Goldwyn-Mayer contracted with Sib Tower 12 Productions to have Chuck Jones and his staff produce new Tom and Jerry cartoons. For his first project with MGM Animation/Visual Arts, Jones read the book The Dot and the Line written by Norton Juster, which was adapted into an animated short that won the Academy Award for Animated Short Film. In January 1966, MGM optioned to adapt The Phantom Tollbooth into a feature-length film. Jones remarked, "It was a natural progression to another Juster work. On this one Les Goldman and Abe Levitow are my co-producers. Levitow and I are directing and Maurice Noble is production designer." Early into development, it was decided that the first few scenes of Milo would be filmed in live-action before transitioning into animation. Dave Monahan, the director of the live action footage, worked with Jones and most of the Sib Tower 12 staff at Warner Bros. Cartoons as a screenwriter during the 1940s.

In a departure from the novel, Ralph was added to the film to act as a friend to Milo. Jones explained, "It had to be a boy named Ralph. Anybody called Steve or Mike would have called with something to do. Ralph sounds like a wet tennis shoe."

== Release ==
On October 24, 1970, the film premiered in Los Angeles as part of MGM's children's matinee weekend engagements. The release was accompanied with six other films that were released across key cities throughout the United States.

=== Home media ===
The film was released in VHS, Betamax, CED, and LaserDisc formats in the 1980s by MGM/UA Home Video. In 2011, it was released in a remastered DVD edition by Warner Home Video via the Warner Archive Collection label. The DVD is matted in a similar manner to Tom and Jerry: The Chuck Jones Collection.

== Soundtrack ==
Music by Lee Pockriss; lyrics by Norman Gimbel, Norman L. Martin and Paul Vance (two more songs) unless otherwise noted.

- "Milo's Song"
- "Don't Say There's Nothing to Do in the Doldrums" (lyrics by Paul Vance)
- "Time Is a Gift"
- "Noise, Noise, Beautiful Noise" (lyrics by Paul Vance)
- "Word Market"
- "Numbers Are the Only Thing That Count"
- "Rhyme and Reason Reign"

== Reception ==
The film was a box office flop. Charles Champlin of the Los Angeles Times wrote that the film "is a lively and warming enchantment with real appeal for the 7-plus age group—and the plusses run up well into adulthood." Stefan Kanfer, reviewing for Time, complimented the film's animation, but remarked the plot "bogs the film down. More than 20 characters are thrown at the audience in 90 minutes; children will barely be able to recognize them before they disappear forever." In conclusion, he stated "The youthful viewer and his parents should overlook Phantom Tollbooth's flaws and concentrate on the film's underlying moral. Discovery and delight do not come at the end of the trail, but along the way. The going is the goal."

Time Out Paris wrote that the story has "too many lessons" but "some very nice ideas". TV Guide rated it three stars out of four and described it as "a charming film that combines some fairly sophisticated ideas [...] with cute and likable characters that are sure to grab a child's attention". Tom Hutchinson of the Radio Times rated it 4/5 stars and wrote that the film has "wonderful ideas", but they are "likely to be a bit above the heads of very young children". The review aggregator website Rotten Tomatoes reports that 100% of ten critics gave the film a positive review with an average rating of 7/10.

Juster had no input into the adaptation and has expressed his hatred for the film in an interview: "It was a film I never liked. I don't think they did a good job on it. It's been around for a long time. It was well reviewed, which also made me angry."

== Possible remake ==
In February 2010, director Gary Ross began development of a live-action remake of The Phantom Tollbooth for Warner Bros. Pictures, the current owner of the film. Alex Tse wrote the first draft. As of August 2016, the remake has moved to TriStar Pictures, with Michael Vukadinovich writing the adaption.

In December 2017, TriStar Pictures picked up the project, and it was announced that Matt Shakman would direct a "live-action/hybrid" film adaptation of The Phantom Tollbooth with a screenplay by Michael Vukadinovich and Phil Johnston. In 2018, Carlos Saldanha replaced Shakman due to scheduling conflicts while Theodore Melfi replaced Vukadinovich and Johnston.

== See also ==
- List of American films of 1970
