= MGM Animation/Visual Arts =

Defunct American animation studio

- The early 1960s Metro-Goldwyn-Mayer cartoon logo.
- Formerly: Sib-Tower 12 Productions, Inc. (1962–1965)
- Industry: Animation; Short films
- Predecessor: MGM Cartoons
- Founded: 1962; 64 years ago
- Founders: Chuck Jones; Les Goldman; Walter Bien
- Defunct: December 1970; 55 years ago
- Fate: Closed
- Successors: Studio: Chuck Jones Enterprises; Metro-Goldwyn-Mayer Animation; Library: Warner Bros. (through Turner Entertainment Co.)
- Headquarters: Culver City, California, U.S.
- Parent: Metro-Goldwyn-Mayer (1964–1970)

MGM Animation/Visual Arts was an American animation studio established in 1962 by animation director/producer Chuck Jones, producer Les Goldman and executive Walter Bien as Sib Tower 12 Productions. Its productions include the last series of Tom and Jerry theatrical shorts, the TV specials Horton Hears a Who! and How the Grinch Stole Christmas!, and the feature film The Phantom Tollbooth, all released by Metro-Goldwyn-Mayer. The studio was closed in December 1970.

== History ==
The studio was founded in 1960 as "S I B Productions, Inc." by Walter Bien, which in 1962 had hired the just developing Filmation Associates to animate a syndicated series called Rod Rocket. Separately Tower 12, Inc. was formed in 1962 by Chuck Jones to produce theatrical shorts, as well as informational and educational shorts, industrial and corporate films, and television programming. It was afterward taken over by SIB Productions, Inc. and evolved into "Sib Tower 12, Inc.", being taken over by Jones after he was fired from Warner Bros. Cartoons, because he was in violation of his contract where he had served for over 30 years directing the Looney Tunes and Merrie Melodies series. A number of animators who had worked under Jones during his Warner Bros. career followed him to Sib Tower 12, as did voice actor Mel Blanc and storyman and writer Michael Maltese. Sib Tower 12 Productions received a contract from Metro-Goldwyn-Mayer to produce a new series of Tom and Jerry cartoons, which proved successful. As a result, MGM purchased the Sib Tower 12 studio from the bankrupt SIB Productions and renamed it MGM Animation/Visual Arts in 1964. This studio continued with Jones' Tom and Jerry shorts until 1967.

In addition to the Tom and Jerry cartoons, Jones worked on the one-off shorts The Dot and the Line (1965), an abstract piece based upon a children's book by Norton Juster which won that year's Academy Award for Animated Short Film; and The Bear That Wasn't (1967), an adaptation of the book of the same name by Jones' onetime Warner Bros. colleague Frank Tashlin.

The studio also turned to television, producing two highly acclaimed TV specials based on books by Dr. Seuss. How the Grinch Stole Christmas!, which aired in 1966, and Horton Hears a Who! in 1970.

The studio's most ambitious work was its 1970 feature film The Phantom Tollbooth, adapted from another Norton Juster book, which had been completed in 1968 but was held up from release until two years later due to internal studio problems.

After the studio closed in late 1970, Chuck Jones went on to found Chuck Jones Film Productions which produced television specials based on the stories of Rudyard Kipling and of The Cricket in Times Square series. In 1993, MGM opened a new animation studio, MGM Animation.

== Filmography ==
=== Theatrical releases ===
Majority of studio's output were Tom and Jerry cartoons, but the studio also produced standalone shorts.

==== Tom and Jerry shorts ====
1963

- Pent-House Mouse

1964

- The Cat Above and the Mouse Below
- Is There a Doctor in the Mouse?
- Much Ado About Mousing
- Snowbody Loves Me
- The Unshrinkable Jerry Mouse

1965

- Ah, Sweet Mouse-Story of Life
- Tom-ic Energy
- Bad Day at Cat Rock
- The Brothers Carry-Mouse-Off
- Haunted Mouse
- I'm Just Wild About Jerry
- Of Feline Bondage
- The Year of the Mouse
- The Cat's Me-Ouch!

1966

- Duel Personality
- Jerry, Jerry, Quite Contrary
- Jerry-Go-Round
- Love Me, Love My Mouse
- Puss 'n' Boats
- Filet Meow
- Matinee Mouse
- The A-Tom-Inable Snowman
- Catty-Cornered

1967

- Cat and Dupli-cat
- O-Solar Meow
- Guided Mouse-ille
- Rock 'n' Rodent
- Cannery Rodent
- The Mouse from H.U.N.G.E.R.
- Surf-Bored Cat
- Shutter Bugged Cat
- Advance and Be Mechanized
- Purr-Chance to Dream

==== One-shot shorts ====
- The Dot and the Line (1965)
- The Bear That Wasn't (1967)

==== Feature films ====
- The Phantom Tollbooth (1970; completed in 1968)

=== Television shows ===
- Tom and Jerry (1965) (bumpers, and reanimation of sequences from the original Hanna-Barbera shorts.)
- Off to See the Wizard (1967–1968)

=== Television specials ===
- How the Grinch Stole Christmas! (1966)
- The Pogo Special Birthday Special (1969)
- Horton Hears a Who! (1970)
- The Cat in the Hat (1971) (initially, moved to DePatie–Freleng Enterprises.)

== See also ==
- Metro-Goldwyn-Mayer cartoon studio
- Metro-Goldwyn-Mayer Animation
- List of Metro-Goldwyn-Mayer theatrical animated feature films
- Chuck Jones Film Productions
- Turner Entertainment Co.
- Warner Bros. Animation
