= Jim Pabian =

American animator (1909–1996)

- Pabian in 1968
- Born: James Anthony Pabian; April 14, 1909; Rochester, New York
- Died: July 23, 1996 (aged 87); Ojai, California
- Education: Mechanics Arts Institute
- Occupations: Animator, screenwriter, director, artist
- Employers: Animated Pictures; Leon Schlesinger Productions; Harman-Ising Productions; Metro-Goldwyn-Mayer cartoon department; Dell Comics; Disney; Hanna-Barbera

James Anthony Pabian (April 14, 1909 – July 23, 1996) was an American animator, screenwriter, director, and artist.

== Life and career ==
Pabian was born on April 14, 1909, in Rochester, New York. When he was 15 years old in 1924, his mother died of a ruptured appendix. He studied at the Mechanics Arts Institute in Rochester before moving to Hollywood in 1931. In the 1930s, he worked as an animator for Ub Iwerks's Animated Pictures, Leon Schlesinger Productions and Harman-Ising Productions. Pabian then worked for the Metro-Goldwyn-Mayer cartoon department in the 1940s and later branched out as a comic artist for Dell Comics in the 1940s and 1950s. He created the syndicated daily comic strips Hollywood Johnnie, Screen Girl, and Go Go Gruver. He also worked on various Disney comics.

In 1955, Pabian was hired by Le Cineastis Associates and moved to Paris with his family. He won an award at the Cannes Film Festival for his work in animation before working with Hanna-Barbera in London. His family moved to Ojai, California, in 1966. In 1968, he established a comic studio called Editor's Workshop Syndicate in Ojai. Pabian was a member of the California Watercolor Society and had his art on display in the Los Angeles County Museum of Art.

In his old age he became legally blind and suffered from Parkinson's disease, causing him to pick up writing rather than animation. In 1992 he published a semi-autobiographical book about the cartoon industry titled Immigrants' Son, which he wrote by dictating to his wife due to his blindness. He died on July 23, 1996, at 87 years old.
