= Metrocolor =

Film processing laboratory

Metrocolor is the trade name used by Metro-Goldwyn-Mayer (MGM) for films processed at their laboratory. Virtually all of these films were shot on Kodak's Eastmancolor film.

Although MGM used Kodak film products, MGM did not use all of Kodak's processes, and could not call their final product Eastmancolor. Kodak's products were used by MGM instead of having their film processed by Technicolor. MGM owned its own lab, located on its Culver City, California lot, until 1986, when it was sold by then-owner Ted Turner to Lorimar, which then sold it to a consortium including Technicolor.
