= Tom Ray =

American animator (1919–2010)

Thomas Archer Ray (August 2, 1919 – April 6, 2010) was an American animator.

== Career ==
Ray was born in Williams, Arizona. He began work at Leon Schlesinger Productions in 1937, working under Tex Avery for six months. He applied for a job at MGM and was hired. According to him, he got paid $18 a week, 6 times the money he got paid at the Warner Bros studio. After enlisting in March 1941, he was stationed at Fort MacArthur, and he rode on the same bus as Jimmy Stewart. He later worked at John Sutherland Productions, getting his first screen credit there with Destination Earth in 1956. In 1958, he returned to Warner Bros. Cartoons and became a master animator in the Robert McKimson unit. After a brief stay in the Friz Freleng unit, he was assigned to work with the Chuck Jones unit, where he co-directed Adventures of the Road-Runner and several Bugs Bunny Show episodes. He followed Jones to MGM Animation/Visual Arts in 1963; there, he directed two Tom and Jerry compilation shorts, Matinee Mouse in 1966 and Shutter Bugged Cat in 1967.

His later credits include animation on Pink Panther shorts, Ralph Bakshi’s Heavy Traffic and Coonskin, Chuck Jones TV specials, numerous Filmation and Hanna-Barbera series. He also was an animator at Rick Reinert Productions, where he did animation on Winnie the Pooh Discovers the Seasons and Winnie the Pooh and a Day for Eeyore, both of which were commissioned by Walt Disney Productions. Ray directed many episodes of various series including the Sunbow Productions animated series based on Hasbro properties like My Little Pony, and was also the director for episodes of Film Roman's Garfield and Friends. He later worked on animation in the 90's like Tiny Toon Adventures, Darkwing Duck, Animaniacs, The Sylvester & Tweety Mysteries and The Mask: Animated Series.

After his retirement from the Los Angeles animation business in 1998, Ray founded his own animation studio, Tomstone Animation, first located in East Stroudsburg, Pennsylvania. Ray moved his studio to Virginia Beach, Virginia just before he died in Virginia on April 6, 2010 aged 90.

Ray's sister, Brenda Ellen Ray, continues to live in Atlanta, Georgia. Ray's son, Thomas G. "Greg" Ray, and daughter, Donna Mouliot, followed him into the animation business.
