= Richard Thompson (animator) =

American animator (1914–1998)

- Born: Richard Lester Thompson; August 26, 1914; Wilmot, South Dakota
- Died: June 12, 1998 (aged 83); Hermosa Beach, California
- Occupation: Animator
- Known for: Road Runner cartoons

Richard Lester Thompson (26 August 1914 – 12 June 1998) was an American animator who worked at several animated cartoon departments over a career of four decades.

== Career ==
Thompson's longest association was with Chuck Jones at Warner Bros. Cartoons and MGM Animation/Visual Arts. Notably, he was an animator on Chuck Jones' Road Runner cartoons. He also worked at Hanna-Barbera and DePatie–Freleng Enterprises. He animated for Tom and Jerry cartoons; for one Peanuts animated special, He's Your Dog, Charlie Brown; and for two Babar TV specials by Mendelson-Melendez Productions, The Story of Babar, the Little Elephant and Babar Comes to America.
