= Ben Washam =

American animator

- Born: Benjamin Alfred Washam; March 17, 1915; Newport, Arkansas, U.S.
- Died: March 28, 1984 (aged 69)
- Occupation: Animator
- Years active: 1936–1979
- Spouse: Jean Washam (m. 1954)
- Children: 1

Benjamin Alfred Washam (March 17, 1915 – March 28, 1984) was an American animator who is best known for working under director Chuck Jones for nearly 30 years. According to his World War II draft registration, he was born in Newport, Jackson County, Arkansas.

== Career ==
Washam worked at Warner Bros. Cartoons from at least 1936 until 1963, mainly under the direction of Chuck Jones. First working as an inbetweener, he quickly rose up the ranks to animator. From 1944 to 1945, he worked at UPA for the films Hell-Bent for Election and Brotherhood of Man. Through the later 1940s and almost all of the 1950s, he was one of Jones' master animators. He also animated for Abe Levitow and Ken Harris during their brief directorial stints in 1959. In the early 1960s, he worked on animated commercials and made-for-television cartoons, animating at Warner's for Jones only in a few one-off shorts. After Jones was fired from Warner Bros., Washam animated for Philbert, which was the last cartoon project before Warner's closed the studio. By the end of 1963, Washam had rejoined Jones at MGM. Washam also directed a few Tom and Jerry cartoons for release in 1967. He also designed the original Big Boy mascot for Bob's Big Boy; Washam and owner Bob Wian had once worked together as fry-cooks.

From the fall of 1967 Washam taught animation at no charge to eager, young students in weekly classes conducted at his Laurel Canyon home in Los Angeles. He explained that "animation has been good to me and I want to give something back." Many of Ben Washam's students from the late 1970s—which included Ren and Stimpy layout artist Eddie Fitzgerald—would lead the 2D Silver Age animation revival during the 1990s. Washam was known for his ability to explain animation mechanics as pertinent, useful methods, articulating and communicating the principles.

Washam served two separate terms as cartoonists' union president, including President of the Screen Animators Guild in 1948–49. His last work involved animating television commercials for Jay Ward and drawing layouts at Jones' production company. Washam retired in 1979. In addition to Washam's animation skill, Jones cited him as an able writer. Jones credited Washam with the "thanks for the sour persimmons, cousin" line in Duck Amuck.

== Style ==
Washam's animation of Bugs Bunny is easy to recognize, as he usually let Bugs' incisor teeth taper to a point. Also, he drew relatively wide cheeks and big pupils on Bugs' eyes. Another Washam trait was his tendency to nod a talking character's head. His work is best recognized by the loose connection of the core body parts, with a great deal of Hip Initiation; this led to multiple assignments of 'personality' scenes, as he could keep interest well in closeup. Chuck Jones commented on his ability to do lovely things with personality animation, although he said that earlier on that his animation was stiff and he tended to work between extremes. His work is angular in pose and fluid in movement.

== Honors and awards ==
- Annie Award: Winsor McCay Award (1985)

== Personal life and final years ==
He was married to fellow animator Jean Washam, whom he met at Warner Bros. in 1951 (Jean also had various stints working for Walt Disney Productions, Hanna-Barbera Productions, and Shamus Culhane's studio, among others) and married three years later. They had a son named Trevor, who shoed horses for a living, and he notably shoed the horses of actors Sylvester Stallone and William Shatner.

Washam died on March 28, 1984, eleven days after his 69th birthday. He was cremated.
