= Michigan J. Frog =

Warner Bros. theatrical cartoon character

- Looney Tunes/Merrie Melodies character
- First appearance: One Froggy Evening (December 31, 1955; 70 years ago)
- Created by: Chuck Jones
- Voiced by: Bill Roberts (1955); John Hillner (1990); Jeff McCarthy (1995–2001); Jeff Bergman (2016); Jeff Bennett (2018); Fred Tatasciore (2023–present)

In-universe information
- Full name: Michigan Jackson Frog
- Species: Frog
- Gender: Male
- Nationality: American

Michigan Jackson Frog is an animated cartoon character from the Warner Bros.' Merrie Melodies film series. Originally a one-shot character, his only appearance during the original run of the Merrie Melodies series was as the star of the "One Froggy Evening" short film (December 31, 1955), written by Michael Maltese and directed by Chuck Jones. In this cartoon, partly inspired by a 1944 Cary Grant film entitled Once Upon a Time, Michigan is a male frog who wears a top hat; carries a cane; and sings pop music, ragtime, Tin Pan Alley hits, and other songs from the late 19th and early 20th centuries while dancing and performing acrobatics in the style of early 20th century vaudeville. Michigan is discovered inside a metal box sealed within the cornerstone of a recently demolished building by a hapless construction worker. He appears as an ordinary frog with a disinterested facial expression until he takes out his top hat and cane and happily demonstrates his talents. The man plans to profit off Michigan but catches on too late that the frog performs exclusively for whomever possesses his box, and changes back into an ordinary frog the second anyone else sees him, thus thwarting the man's dreams of wealth and showing the frog for who he really is.

He appeared in a later cartoon titled Another Froggy Evening, which was released on October 6, 1995, and was the mascot of The WB from that year until July 22, 2005. On September 17, 2006, after The Night of Favorites and Farewells, he was shown as the final image of a white silhouette bowing down to viewers, bringing up The CW.

== History ==
The character may be loosely based on Ol' Rip the Horned Toad.

The frog's earliest name was "Enrico", as given in The Bugs Bunny Show (1960). The character's later, enduring name comes from the song "The Michigan Rag" (an original song written by Jones, Maltese, and musical director Milt Franklyn), which he sings in the cartoon. In a clip from a DVD special, Jones stated that he had come up with the name "Michigan Frog" during the 1970s and was inspired to add the "J." as a middle initial while being interviewed by the writer Jay Cocks.

The Looney Tunes Golden Collection DVD credits Frog's original singing vocals to Bill Roberts, a nightclub entertainer in Los Angeles in the 1950s who had also done voice work for the 1948 MGM cartoon Little 'Tinker. (Roberts went uncredited at the time, as were most voice actors at the Warner Bros. studio who were not Mel Blanc, since only Blanc had a clause in his contract ensuring he would get on-screen credit.) In Another Froggy Evening, his voice was provided by Jeff McCarthy. In the cartoon From Hare to Eternity, Yosemite Sam digs up a treasure chest filled with carrots on a desert island; he also digs up Michigan J. Frog in his box who begins singing. However, Sam immediately shuts the box and tosses it away yelling, "Not in my picture!" Then, pokes his head out saying, "I hate frogs."

Michigan J. Frog made a cameo appearance in the New Looney Tunes episode "Misjudgment Day", voiced by Jeff Bergman. He appears at the end of the episode (including a futuristic version of the first three lines of "Hello! Ma Baby", which can also be heard in the background as Michigan croaks) as the one who sent one of his futuristic robots to destroy Bugs Bunny, and he later appeared in the show's second season intro.

A frog resembling Michigan appeared in the beginning of the 1988 Disney/Amblin film Who Framed Roger Rabbit at Maroon Cartoon Studios. The character also appears on the cover illustration (drawn by Chuck Jones) of singer-songwriter Leon Redbone's 1975 album On the Track.

Michigan makes his return in the Teen Titans Go! episode "Warner Bros. 100th Anniversary", voiced by Fred Tatasciore. He serves as the main antagonist, destroying the Warner Bros. studio and eliminating the majority of the studio's other characters as revenge for the Titans not inviting him to the studio's 100th anniversary party.

=== Years with The WB ===
Michigan's design from 1998 to 2001, which gives him the upper half of a morning suit in addition to his top hat and cane

Michigan J. Frog, again voiced by McCarthy, was the official mascot of The WB from its inception in 1995 until 2005. The network's first night of programming on January 11, 1995, began with Bugs Bunny and Daffy Duck wondering which one of them would pull the switch to launch The WB. The camera then panned over to Chuck Jones drawing Michigan on an easel; when Jones finished, Michigan leaped from the drawing to formally launch The WB and lands on Chuck's shoulder who then says "What's Up, Frog?"

Michigan also would usually appear before the opening of shows, informing the viewer of the TV rating. Before the beginning of Savannah, for example, the frog would sing a short monologue suggesting that "there's more comedy for the family Wednesday nights" and that kids should go to bed, meaning that the show coming on would be for mature audiences only. In later shows like Buffy the Vampire Slayer and Angel, the announcer would present a TV-PG disclaimer, though the frog still appeared as a neon sign.

On July 22, 2005, Michigan's "death" was announced by WB Chairman Garth Ancier at a fall season preview with the terse statement "The frog is dead and buried." The head of programming for The WB, David Janollari, stated that "[Michigan] was a symbol that perpetuated the young teen feel of the network. That's not the image we [now] want to put out to our audience." However, this announcement was later withdrawn shortly as WB exec Brad Turell mentioned that the character is alive and well in Bolivia under the witness protection plan.

While The WB's move towards a more adult-oriented content was Warner's stated reason for abandoning the character, a more common theory is Michigan's character was abandoned due to his connection to historical minstrelsy, often featuring racist depictions of African-Americans through blackface. On February 5, 2003, two years before Michigan's retirement, the Chappelle's Show episode "Zapped & It's a Wonderful Chest" aired with a skit mocking the character's connections to blackface.

Various humorous obituaries for the mascot were published with details on Michigan's life and death. His dates were given as December 31, 1955 – July 22, 2005. Despite the announcement by Ancier, Michigan still appeared in several Kids' WB! promos and bumpers (for example, a cart version of himself), The WB's metonym ("The Frog") until 2006, and in some WB affiliate logos and in TV spots, such as KWBF in Little Rock, Arkansas (whose early slogan was "The Frog"; the "F" in KWBF is supposedly for "frog"), during 2006, and WBRL-CA in Baton Rouge, Louisiana. Also, WMJF, which began as a small student-run television station at Towson University just outside Baltimore, Maryland, still uses the same call letters (WMJF – Michigan J. Frog) from when the station was a WB affiliate. A neon likeness of Michigan J. Frog also adorns the facade of former WB affiliate WBNX-TV's studio complex in Cuyahoga Falls, Ohio.

When The WB ceased broadcasting and signed off the air for the final time on September 17, 2006, a white silhouette of Michigan appeared at the end of a montage of stars that appeared on the network during its 11-year history. When the montage ended with "Thank You", Michigan's silhouette is shown removing his top hat and bowing to thank the audience for 11 years, bringing The WB to a close, and later bringing The CW the following day, September 18, 2006.

== Songs performed ==
The following includes all songs sung by Michigan in official Warner Bros. media.

- "Hello! Ma Baby"
- "The Michigan Rag"
- "I'm Just Wild About Harry"
- "Come Back to Erin"
- "Throw Him Down McCloskey"
- "Won’t You Come Over to My House?"
- "Largo al factotum"
- "Please Don't Talk About Me When I'm Gone"
- "Moonlight Bay"
- "Yankee Doodle Dandy"
- "Let the Rest of the World Go By"
- "Lulu's Back in Town"
- "Lullaby of Broadway"
- "Ain't We Got Fun"
- "By a Waterfall"
- "I Get a Kick Out of You"
- "Jeepers Creepers"
- "Tiptoe Through the Tulips"
- "42nd Street"
- "Boulevard of Broken Dreams"
- "I Guess I'll Have to Change My Plan"
- "Too Marvelous for Words"
- "Der Deitcher's Dog"
- "Pop Goes the Weasel"
- "Go In and Out the Window"
- "Swing Low, Sweet Chariot"
- "The Irish Washerwoman"

== Voice actors ==
- Bill Roberts: "One Froggy Evening", Looney Tunes: Back in Action (archive recordings), Looney Tunes: Back in Action – The Video Game (archive recordings), Looney Tunes World of Mayhem (archive recordings)
- John Hillner: Tiny Toon Adventures
- Jeff McCarthy: Another Froggy Evening, Animaniacs, The Sylvester & Tweety Mysteries, From Hare to Eternity, bumpers on The WB and Kids' WB until 2001
- Tom Kenny: Duck Dodgers
- Larry Herron: Robot Chicken
- Jeff Bergman: New Looney Tunes
- Jeff Bennett: Ani-Mayhem
- Fred Tatasciore: Tiny Toons Looniversity, Teen Titans Go!

== See also ==
- Animaniacs
- Bugs Bunny
- Living entombed animal
- Tiny Toon Adventures
- Warner Bros. Animation
- The WB

== Bibliography ==
- Comics Buyer's Guide #1614 (March 2006, p. 38)
