= Ol' Rip the Horned Toad =

Texas horned lizard (died 1929)

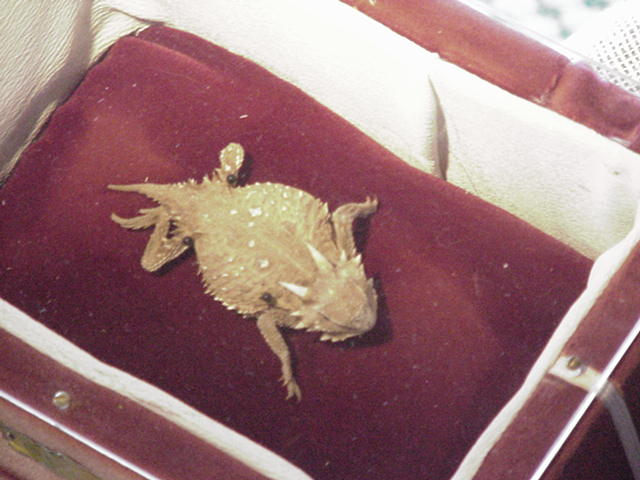
Old Rip in his coffin in Eastland County Courthouse

Old Rip the Horned Toad (died January 19, 1929) was a Texas horned lizard (Phrynosoma cornutum), commonly referred to as a "horned toad" or "horny toad", which supposedly survived a 31-year hibernation as an entombed animal following its exhumation from a cornerstone in Eastland, Texas, on February 18, 1928. The lizard became a national celebrity and appeared in 1920s motion pictures. Its name was a reference to American writer Washington Irving's fictional character Rip Van Winkle. The same year, a Texas political delegation led by Senator Earle Mayfield presented the docile lizard to President Calvin Coolidge at the White House for his inspection.

Following the creature's fame, horned toads were sold by the thousands as souvenirs at public events, including the 1928 Democratic National Convention. The ensuing mass capture and export of the horned toads resulted in the genus's abrupt decline in West Central Texas and prompted an intervention by the Texas Department of Agriculture.

Decades later, the saga of Old Rip inspired Looney Tunes scribe Michael Maltese to write a 1955 animated theatrical short entitled One Froggy Evening. In the cartoon, a construction worker demolishing an old building finds an 1892 time capsule inside a cornerstone. The capsule contains a living frog which is able to sing Tin Pan Alley songs such as "Hello! Ma Baby" and "I'm Just Wild About Harry".

== History ==
=== Alleged entombment ===
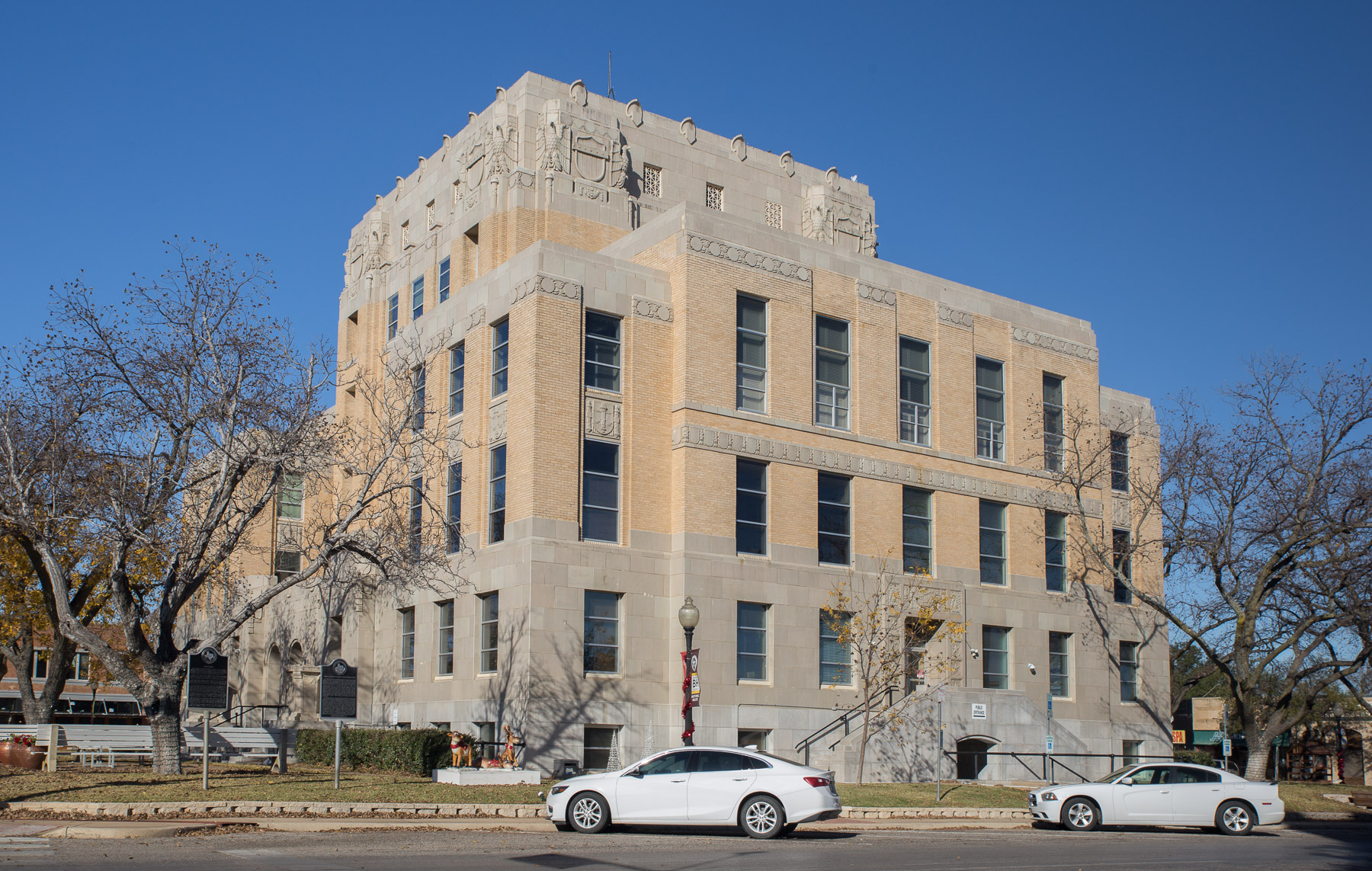
Eastland County Courthouse in 2021

On July 29, 1897, a four-year-old boy named Will Wood caught a horned toad in Eastland County, Texas. His father, Eastland County clerk Ernest E. Wood, decided to test the West Texas tradition that the creatures could survive for many years in hibernation. The horned lizard was placed in a time capsule in a cornerstone of the Eastland courthouse along with memorabilia, including a Bible and a bottle of alcohol.

Thirty years later, during the Jazz Age, construction workers began to tear down the old courthouse, and town officials scheduled a public event to open the time capsule in mid-February 1928. An ambitious young newspaperman named Boyce House reported on the forthcoming ceremony in his articles for the Fort Worth Star-Telegram. House particularly emphasized the mystery of the horned toad which supposedly had been entombed in the capsule since 1897.

As a result of House's sensationalist newspaper articles, a crowd of 1,500 spectators gathered in Eastland, Texas, to witness the opening of the time capsule and to learn the fate of the horned toad. Many spectators had traveled more than 25 miles to be present, and hundreds thronged around the makeshift fence that encircled the old courthouse. At exactly four o'clock on Saturday, February 18, 1928, a live horned lizard was allegedly produced from within the time capsule in front of the excited audience. Newspaperman Boyce House recalled the chaotic scene:

When the brick wall was pulled away from the cornerstone, the crowd rushed forward, in its excitement, pressing so closely against a worker that he barely had room to ply his pick to break a layer of cement over the top of the stone. Then, he lifted a sheet of metal underlying the cement. As this covering was raised, disclosing the cavity, Rev. F. E. Singleton (pastor of the Eastland Methodist Church), standing beside the cornerstone, leveled a finger and said: "There's the frog!" An oil man, Eugene Day, thrust his hand into the cavity and lifted a flat, dust-covered toad, which he handed to Rev. Mr. Singleton. The pastor handed the creature to Judge Pritchard, who dangled it with a hind leg that all might see. Suddenly, the other hind leg twitched: The frog was alive!

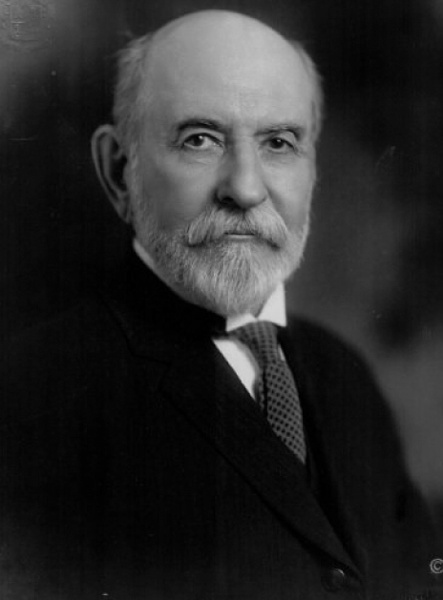
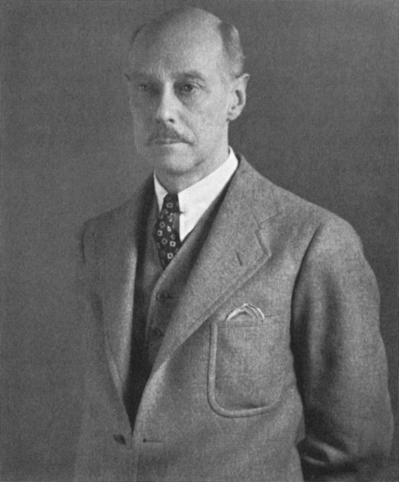
William Temple Hornaday supported the claim of the horned toad's survival, while Raymond L. Ditmars declared its survival to be impossible.

Within days, national newspaper chains reported the discovery of the entombed lizard on their front pages. The New York Times reported the event on its front page with the declarative headline: "Toad Alive After 31 Years Sealed in Texas Cornerstone". The Times article credulously reported:

After the cornerstone was removed, the toad appeared lifeless for some time, but in a little while, it opened its eyes. In about twenty minutes, it began to breathe. The mouth, however, appeared to have grown together. Efforts will be made to induce the toad to take food, and, if necessary, the mouth will be opened by an operation. The toad is now on exhibition.

Following these newspaper reports, zoologists and other scientists began a public debate over whether a Texas horned toad could survive such an extended period without water, sunlight, or oxygen. Raymond L. Ditmars, curator of mammals and reptiles at the Bronx Zoo, declared the alleged survival of the entombed lizard in Eastland, Texas, to be "utterly impossible". In contrast, preeminent naturalist William T. Hornaday, the curator of the New York Zoological Gardens, asserted that "the incident was possible—and gave an instance from his own experience in Ceylon". Indifferent to this scientific debate, Eastland locals instead ascribed the horned toad's "miraculous" survival for thirty-one years to the presence of the Bible in the time capsule.

=== National fame ===
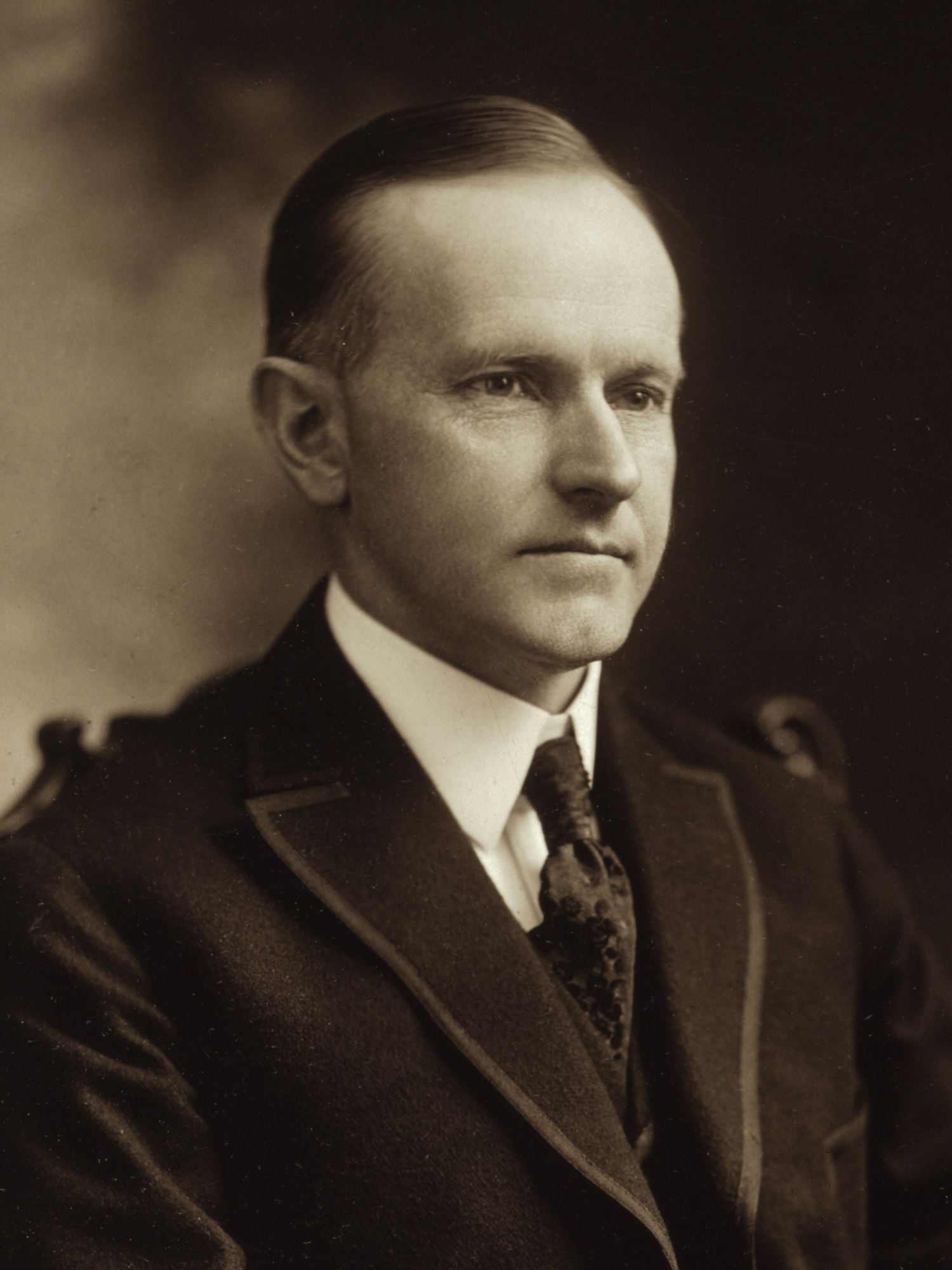
Calvin Coolidge inspected Ol' Rip at the White House. He declined to touch Ol' Rip, but he stroked the lizard with his spectacles.

Due to the extensive media coverage, Old Rip became a national celebrity. The docile lizard was transported to Dallas, Texas, for public exhibition by Will Wood, the same individual who purportedly found the specimen as a boy in 1897. After a public outcry by Eastland inhabitants and profit-hungry business people over removing the famous creature from their otherwise nondescript and insignificant town, Wood returned Old Rip to Eastland. Dallas exhibitors promptly sued Wood for $6,000 (equivalent to $112,500 in 2025) for alleged breach of contract.

After this incident, Old Rip went on a national tour, and forty thousand spectators viewed him at the Zoological Gardens in St. Louis, Missouri. Later that same year in New York City, motion pictures were produced with Will Wood introducing Old Rip, and "a bug-catcher was paid $0.50 (equivalent to $9.38 in 2025) each for insects that the frog devoured to please the cameraman".

The peak of Rip's fame occurred in May 1928 when, during his national tour, the lizard was transported to Washington, D.C., where Texas senator Earle Bradford Mayfield presented the specimen to President Calvin Coolidge. A bemused Coolidge purportedly declined to touch the horned toad and merely nudged it with his spectacles. A newspaper article reported the incident:

President Coolidge asked numerous questions concerning his celebrated guest; stroked the frog's back with his horn-rimmed glasses, and then President and Old Rip gazed steadily at each other for a full minute without a sound—Silent Cal had met his match.

As a consequence of the creature's immense fame, horned toads were sold as souvenirs at the 1928 Democratic National Convention in Houston, Texas, for $2.50 (equivalent to $46.88 in 2025). The mass capture and export of horned toads for such sales resulted in the genus' precipitous decline in West Texas. According to Texas journalist Boyce House: "So many [horned toads] were shipped out of West Texas that a Department of Agriculture bulletin foretold damage amounting to thousands of dollars if the [export] shipments did not stop inasmuch as horned frogs preyed on insects that would devour [local] crops."

=== Death and controversy ===
Soon after his national tour, Old Rip died of pneumonia on January 19, 1929. After Old Rip's death, the specimen was kept in a tiny velvet-lined casket, provided by the National Casket Company, and displayed in the lobby of the new Eastland courthouse.

Decades later, in September 1961, Old Rip briefly disappeared from the museum exhibit, and a ransom note demanded $10,000 (equivalent to $107,739 in 2025) for his return. After a city-wide search, the specimen was recovered. A year later, in 1962, John Connally visited the courthouse while running for governor of Texas for a publicity event. An impetuous Connally lifted the embalmed creature by its hind leg which abruptly detached.

In 1972, Rip's body was again stolen. Soon after, the City of Eastland claimed they had somehow "found" the stolen specimen and returned the object to exhibition. However, museum visitors noted the "recovered" toad now inexplicably had four feet, while the original specimen only had three feet, presumably due to the earlier 1962 incident with John Connally.

In 1976, an anonymous letter was sent to newspapers claiming the original, three-footed specimen was still in the thief's possession, and the City of Eastland had replaced the original specimen with a fake. Angry that "the city of Eastland was building its future around a dried-up horned frog", the letter-writer offered to pay $5,000 (equivalent to $28,289 in 2025) to anyone who could prove the toad in the courthouse was truly Ol' Rip.

=== Legacy and influence ===
In 1955, Looney Tunes writer Michael Maltese was inspired by the story of Old Rip to write an animated theatrical short entitled One Froggy Evening. In the cartoon, a construction worker demolishing a building finds an 1892 time capsule inside a cornerstone. The capsule contains a living frog, retroactively named Michigan J. Frog years later, which is able to sing Tin Pan Alley songs such as "Hello! Ma Baby" and "I'm Just Wild About Harry".

Old Rip's story was told in the 2004 documentary short ToadSpotting: The Legend of Old Rip.
