= Jeff McCarthy =

American actor and director (born 1954)

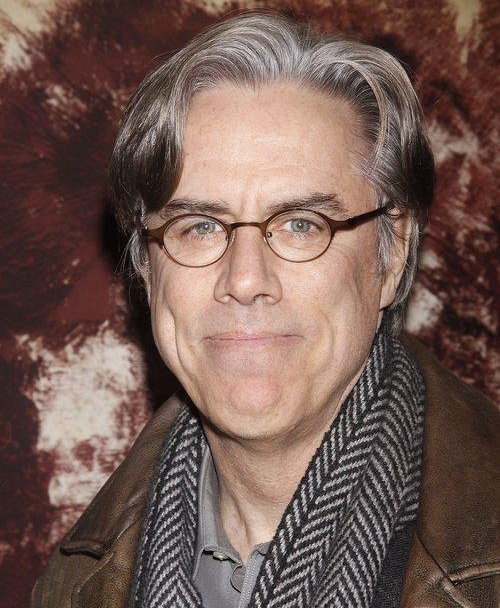
- McCarthy in 2015
- Born: Jeffrey Charles McCarthy; October 16, 1954 (age 71); Los Angeles, California, U.S.
- Occupations: Actor; director
- Years active: 1983–present
- Spouse: Pamela J. Perrell (m. 1987, divorced)
- Children: 2

Jeffrey Charles McCarthy (born October 16, 1954) is an American actor and director.

== Early life and education ==
McCarthy was born in Los Angeles, California, and grew up in Santa Maria near the Pacific Conservatory of the Performing Arts, where he studied and performed for several seasons in the 1970s. He completed the masters program in acting at the American Conservatory Theater in San Francisco before becoming a company member.

== Career ==
=== Stage ===
In 1983, he debuted on Broadway, replacing Robert Westenberg playing opposite Anthony Quinn in Zorba. McCarthy played Bob Freelander in Marvin Hamlisch and Howard Ashman's ill-fated Smile, which opened on Broadway in November 1986. He played Terry in the original Broadway cast of Side Show in 1997, recorded for Sony Music. He is perhaps best known in the theater for his creation of Officer Lockstock in the Broadway production of Urinetown, which opened on Broadway in September 2001. From 1995 - 97, McCarthy played the "Beast" in the Broadway production of Beauty and the Beast . He later returned to the role for a limited engagement lasting from February through April 2004. He also played King Triton in a workshop for Disney's stage adaptation of The Little Mermaid. McCarthy played Dubhdara in the musical The Pirate Queen which opened on Broadway in April 2007. In 2008, 2009 and 2011, McCarthy played Billy Flynn in Chicago, the long-running Broadway revival. McCarthy created the role of Lola Cola in the premiere of the bluegrass musical, Southern Comfort which opened at the Off-Broadway Public Theater in March 2016.

In February 2017 at the Off-Broadway 59E59 Theaters, McCarthy created the title character in Jeffrey Sweet's Kunstler about the radical civil rights attorney, William Kunstler." By popular demand, he went on to play the role in the Barrington Stage Company (Pittfield, Massachusetts) production, which opened in May 2017. (McCarthy is an associate artist at the Barrington Stage Company.)

In 2012, McCarthy played the title role in Dr. Seuss' How the Grinch Stole Christmas! The Musical at Madison Square Garden.

McCarthy has worked extensively in regional theater playing leading roles at The Guthrie, Long Wharf Theater, Arena Stage, Barrington Stage, ACT San Francisco, Denver Center Theater and others. Some of his notable regional credits include Fagin in Oliver!, the title role in Sweeney Todd, Henry Higgins in My Fair Lady, Don Quixote / Miguel de Cervantes in Man of La Mancha, Frank Abagnale, Sr. in Catch Me If You Can, King Arthur in Camelot, Harold Hill in The Music Man, the title role in Sunday in the Park with George, and Nathan Detroit in Guys and Dolls.

His touring credits include Javert in Les Misérables, The Pirate King in The Pirates of Penzance, the title role in Dr. Seuss' How the Grinch Stole Christmas! The Musical, and Billy Flynn in Chicago.

=== Screen ===
==== Television ====
McCarthy made his screen debut in 1985 on the CBS series The Equalizer in the season one episode, "The Lock Box" in a brief scene as a Waiter, who servers a burger that is much too rare to J. T. Walsh's character, Sam Griffith. Four months later, McCarthy appeared again in the 1986 episode "Breakpoint" as Gary Speer, who is relieved to be released from a deadly-serious hostage crisis by the Terrorist Leader, played by Tony Shalhoub. He has since appeared in more than thirty television shows, such as the 1980s series, Freddy's Nightmares (1989), and Matlock (1989).

In the 1990s, McCarthy made two appearances in the Star Trek franchise. On Star Trek: The Next Generation, he appeared in the season three 1990 episode "The Hunted" as Roga Danar. On Star Trek: Voyager in the 1995 pilot episode "Caretaker," McCarthy played the unnamed chief medical officer of the USS Voyager. He also appeared on Cheers (1991), In the Heat of the Night (1991), LA Law (1992), Designing Women (1993), and Law & Order (1999).

In the new millennium, McCarthy had two roles on Law & Order: Special Victims Unit (2001, 2006), and a role on Ed (2004). In 2006, he played Wayne's father on the short lived CBS show Love Monkey, and played Albert Schweitzer in the PBS television film Albert Schweitzer: Called to Africa. He appeared on The Good Wife (2010), Elementary (2016), and Madam Secretary (2017). In 2011, David Letterman created a running bit for McCarthy who played a politician who, in the middle of primary season, announces on the Late Show that he will run for President of the United States. McCarthy also portrayed the Nature Documentary Voice in an episode in the first season of the Apple TV+ thriller series Severance (2022).

==== Film ====
McCarthy has played various roles in films including Andrew Wagner's drama Starting Out in the Evening (2007) with Frank Langella, as Mark in Consent (2010) opposite Kate Burton, RoboCop 2 (1990) playing Holtzgang, the lawyer representing the company that built RoboCop, Eve of Destruction (1991) as Young Bill Simmons, Agent Anderson in Rapid Fire (1992), and a Pilot in Cliffhanger (1993).

McCarthy was chosen by Chuck Jones to be the voice of Michigan J. Frog in his 1995 Another Froggy Evening, a sequel to the original 1955 cartoon One Froggy Evening. McCarthy went on to voice Michigan J. Frog, "spokesphibian" for the WB Television Network.

=== Directing ===
He has directed stage and film productions, including, Danny and The Deep Blue Sea for the 29th St Project, NYC, The Glass Menagerie for the University of New Hampshire and Urinetown for the University of Oklahoma. Working with his brother, Jim McCarthy in 2016, he wrote, directed and edited Keepsake, a short film featuring his daughter, the actress Juliet Perrell McCarthy.

== Filmography ==
=== Film ===
- 1990: RoboCop 2 – Holzgang
- 1991: Eve of Destruction – Young Bill Simmons
- 1992: Rapid Fire – Agent Anderson
- 1993: Cliffhanger – Pilot
- 2007: Starting Out in the Evening – Charles
- 2010: Consent – Mark

=== Television ===
Jeff McCarthy television credits
Year	Title	Role	Notes	Ref.
1985-1986	The Equalizer	Waiter/Gary Speer	2 episodes	
1989	Freddy's Nightmares	Coach Gacey	Episode: "Do Dreams Bleed?"	
1989	Matlock	Thomas Oldham	Episode: "The Cult"	
1989	Snoops	Lt. Col. Tusko	Episode: "The Big Brass Cookie Jar"	
1989-1990	Knots Landing	Priest/Pastor	2 episodes	
1990	Star Trek: The Next Generation	Roga Danar	Episode: "The Hunted"	
1990	Hunter	Lt. Horton	Episode: "A Snitch'll Break Your Heart"	
1990	Doogie Howser, M.D.	Bradford Eisner	Episode: "TV or Not TV"	
1991	Cheers	Leon	Episode: "I'm Getting My Act Together and Sticking It In Your Face"	
1991	Equal Justice	Shattuck/Ellis Bernstein	4 episodes	
1991	In the Heat of the Night	FBI Agent Chris Hayes	Episode: "An Eye for an Eye"	
1992	LA Law	Greg Corcoran	Episode: "Wine Knot"	
1992	Civil Wars	John Kellog	Episode: "A Bus Named Desire"	
1993	Designing Women	Justin	Episode: "Sex, Lives and Bad Hair Days"	
1993	South of Sunset	Kyle Hanson	Episode: "Family Affair"	
1995	Star Trek: Voyager	Human Doctor	Episode: "Caretaker"	
1999	Law & Order	Mitchell Brizzard	Episode: "DNR"	
2001-2006	Law & Order: Special Victims Unit	D.A. Matthews/Mr. Hoskins	2 episodes	
2004	Ed	Jerry Caravolo	Episode: "Pressure Points"	
2006	Love Monkey	Wayne's Father	2 episodes	
2006	Albert Schweitzer: Called to Africa	Albert Schweitzer	TV movie	
2008	All My Children	Judge	3 episodes	
2010	The Good Wife	Mitch	Episode: "Doubt"	
2011	Late Show with David Letterman	Presidential Candidate (uncredited)	2 episodes	
2016	Elementary	Werner Platz	Episode: "How is the Sausage Made?"	
2017	Madam Secretary	Don Mitchell	Episode: "The Seventh Floor"	
2022	Severance	Nature Documentary Voice	Episode: "Good News About Hell"	
