= Court–Exchange Building =

- Court Exchange Building-National Casket Company
- U.S. National Register of Historic Places
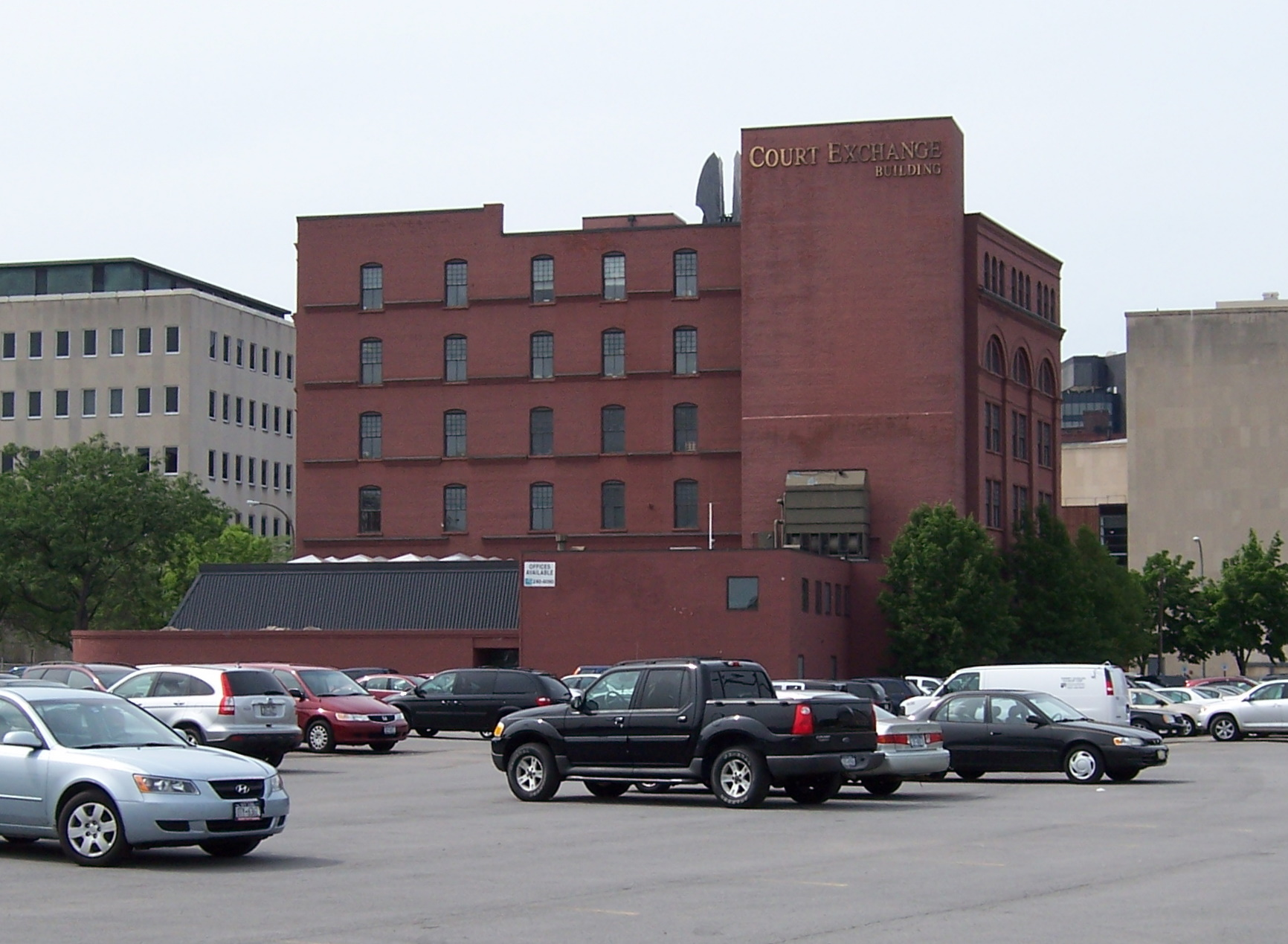
- The Court–Exchange Building in June 2010

- Location within New York Location within the United States
- Location: 142 Exchange St., Rochester, New York
- Coordinates: 43°9′9″N 77°36′40″W
- Area: less than one acre
- Built: 1881
- Architect: Ellis, Harvey
- Architectural style: Romanesque, Richardsonian Romanesque
- MPS: Inner Loop MRA
- NRHP reference No.: 85002850
- Added to NRHP: October 04, 1985

The Court–Exchange Building (formerly the National Casket Company building) is a historic industrial and commercial building located at 142 Exchange Street (at the corner of Court Street) in Rochester, New York.

It is a six-story brick structure with Richardsonian Romanesque details designed by Harvey Ellis and built in 1881 for Samuel Stein, a local manufacturer of wooden caskets. When Stein retired in 1890, he sold his business to the National Casket Company. The building was used until 1984 to manufacture, display, and warehouse caskets.

It was listed on the National Register of Historic Places in 1985.

== See also ==
- National Register of Historic Places listings in Rochester, New York
