= Living entombed animal =

19th century hoax of animals staying alive encased in rock

Living entombed animals are animals supposedly found alive after being encased in solid rock, coal, or wood for a long period of time. The accounts usually involve frogs or toads. No physical evidence exists, and the phenomenon has been dismissed by David Bressan.

== Reports ==
References to entombed animals have appeared in the writings of William of Newburgh, J. G. Wood, Ambroise Paré, Robert Plot, André Marie Constant Duméril, John Wesley, and others. Even Charles Dickens mentioned the phenomenon in his journal All the Year Round. According to the Fortean Times, about 210 entombed animal cases have been described in Europe, North America, Africa, Australia, and New Zealand since the fifteenth century. In 1771, an experiment was supposedly conducted by the Academy of Sciences at Paris in which three toads were encased in plaster and sealed in a box for 3 years, upon which it was found that two of the toads were still alive.

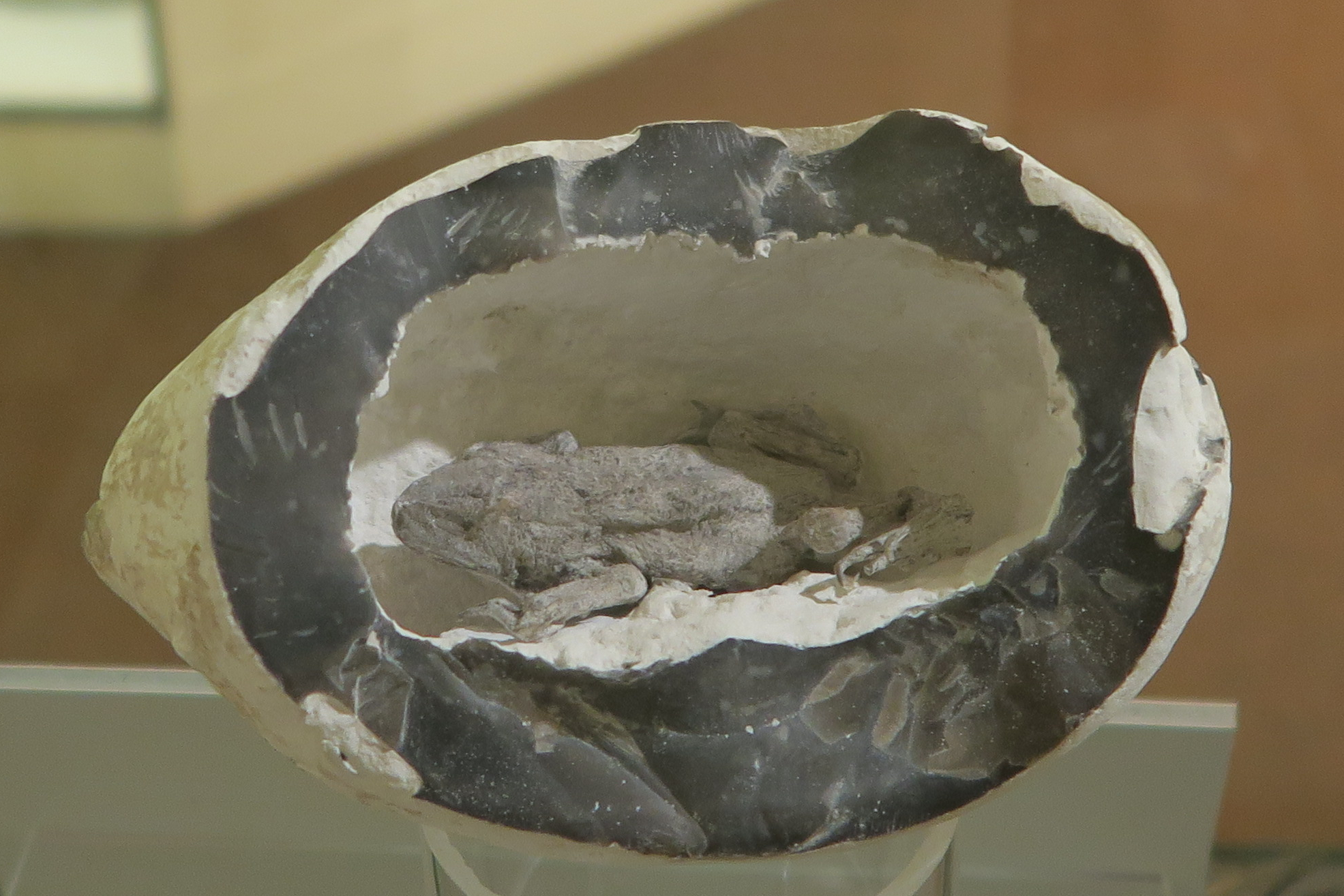
A mummified toad within a hollow flint nodule, presented by Charles Dawson and claimed to have been found by workmen in a Lewes quarry around 1900. It is thought to be a fake. Booth Museum, Brighton

At times, a number of animals are said to have been encased in the same place. Benjamin Franklin wrote an account of four live toads supposedly found enclosed in quarried limestone. In a letter to Julian Huxley, one Eric G. Mackley claimed to have freed 23 frogs from a single piece of concrete while widening a road in Devonshire. An 1876 report from South Africa said that 63 small toads were found in the middle of a 16-foot-wide (5 m) tree trunk.

== Explanations ==
Though reports of entombed animals have occurred as recently as the 1980s, scientists have paid little serious attention to the phenomenon since the nineteenth century. During the 1820s, English geologist William Buckland conducted an experiment to see how long a toad could remain alive while encased in stone. He placed toads of different sizes and ages into carved chambers within limestone and sandstone blocks sealed with glass covers, then buried the blocks in his garden. A year later, he dug up the blocks and found that most of the toads were dead and decayed. A few toads that had been in the porous limestone were still living, but the glass had developed cracks which Buckland believed may have admitted small insects. However, Buckland found them all dead after reburying them in the limestone for another year. Buckland concluded that toads could not survive inside rock for extreme lengths of time, and determined that reports of the entombed animal phenomenon were mistaken. Most scientists agreed. A writer from the journal Nature wrote in 1910,

The true interpretation of these alleged occurrences appears to be simply this – a frog or toad is hopping about while a stone is being broken, and the non-scientific observer immediately rushes to the conclusion that he has seen the creature dropping out of the stone itself. One thing is certainly remarkable, that although numbers of field geologists and collectors of specimens of rocks, fossils, and minerals are hammering away all over the world, not one of these investigators has ever come upon a specimen of a live frog or toad imbedded in stone or in coal.

Some of the stories may be based on outright fabrications. Charles Dawson, quite probably the perpetrator of the Piltdown Man hoax, had some years earlier presented the Brighton "Toad in the Hole" (a toad entombed within a flint nodule), likely another forgery. Dawson presented the toad to the Brighton and Hove Natural History and Philosophical Society on 18 April 1901, claiming that two workmen had found the flint nodule in a quarry north-east of Lewes a couple of years earlier, which revealed a toad inside when they broke it open. The toad was eventually passed on to the Booth Museum of Natural History in Brighton via Henry Willett. However, the toad has since shrunk, suggesting that it cannot have been very old at the time of its discovery.

== In literature ==
D. H. Lawrence, in the foreword to his book, Studies in Classic American Literature, writes:

All right, Americans, let's see you set about it. Go on then, let the precious cat out of the bag. If you're sure he's in.
Et interrogatum ab omnibus:
"Ubi est ille Toad-in-the-Hole?
"Et iteratum est ab omnibus:
"Non est inventus!”
Is he or isn't he inventus?

A fictional example of an entombed animal occurs in the Warner Bros. Merrie Melodies six-minute cartoon "One Froggy Evening". The character Michigan J. Frog is twice discovered inside the cornerstone of a razed building.

A reference to the phenomenon occurs in Dante Gabriel Rossetti's poem "Jenny", which mentions a "toad within a stone / Seated while time crumbles on".

In Victor Hugo's Ninety-Three, Danton says to Marat: "for six thousand years, Cain has been preserved in hatred like a toad in a stone. The rock is broken, and Cain leaps forth among men, and that is Marat."

== See also ==
- Cryopreservation
- Ol' Rip the Horned Toad
- Suspended animation
