= One Froggy Evening =

1955 film directed by Chuck Jones

- Directed by: Charles M. Jones
- Story by: Michael Maltese
- Starring: William "Bill" Roberts (Michigan J. Frog - uncredited)
- Music by: Milt Franklyn
- Animation by: Ken Harris; Abe Levitow; Ben Washam; Richard Thompson
- Layouts by: Robert Gribbroek
- Backgrounds by: Philip DeGuard
- Color process: Technicolor
- Production company: Warner Bros. Cartoons
- Distributed by: Warner Bros. Pictures
- Release dates: December 31, 1955; December 6, 1969 (Blue Ribbon reissue)
- Running time: 6:56
- Country: United States
- Language: English (Only the singing voice of Michigan J. Frog)

One Froggy Evening is a 1955 American Technicolor animated musical short film written by Michael Maltese and directed by Chuck Jones, with musical direction by Milt Franklyn. The short, partly inspired by a 1944 Cary Grant film entitled Once Upon a Time involving a dancing caterpillar in a small box, marks the debut of Michigan J. Frog: an anthropomorphic frog with a talent for singing and dancing that he demonstrates for no one except whoever possesses the box wherein he resides. This popular short contained a wide variety of musical entertainment, with songs ranging from "Hello! Ma Baby" and "I'm Just Wild About Harry", two Tin Pan Alley classics, to "Largo al Factotum", Figaro's aria from the opera Il Barbiere di Siviglia (The Barber of Seville). The short was released on December 31, 1955, as part of Warner Bros.' Merrie Melodies series of cartoons.

In 1994, it was voted No. 5 of The 50 Greatest Cartoons of all time by members of the animation field. In 2003, the United States Library of Congress deemed the film "culturally, historically, or aesthetically significant", and selected it for preservation in the National Film Registry.

The film is included in the Looney Tunes Golden Collection: Volume 2 DVD box set (Disc 4) and the Looney Tunes Platinum Collection: Volume 1 Blu-ray box set (Disc 2), along with an audio commentary, optional music-only audio track (only the instrumental, not the vocal), and a making-of documentary, It Hopped One Night: A Look at "One Froggy Evening". It was also featured on the VHS release of Little Giants.

== Plot ==
In 1955, a demolition worker involved in tearing down the "J. C. Wilber Building" pries off the top of the cornerstone and finds a metal box within. The unnamed man opens the box and finds, along with a commemorative document dated April 16, 1892, a live frog inside. After the frog suddenly dons a top hat and cane performs a musical number on the spot, the man sees an opportunity to cash in on the frog's anthropomorphic talents and sneaks away from the site with the frog in the box under his arm.

Every attempt the man makes to exploit the frog fails: the frog performs exclusively for his owner and instantly devolves into an ordinary frog the second anyone else sees him. Remaining unaware of this reality, the man takes the frog to a talent agent. After getting kicked out over the frog's apparent inability to act, he uses his life savings to rent an abandoned theater so he can showcase the frog on his own. The frog performs atop a high wire behind the closed curtain, while the man struggles to get an audience and succeeds with the promise of "Free Beer". As the frog winds down the song, the man breaks the cord of the curtain he is trying to open. By the time the man reaches and pulls what remains of the cord, fully revealing the frog to the crowd, the frog has again reverted to his ordinary state. The angry crowd pelts the man with rotten vegetables.

Following these failures, the man is now homeless and living on a park bench; there, the frog still performs only for him. When a policeman overhears the singing in the middle of the night, he approaches the man, who points to the frog as the singer. When the frog again presents himself as ordinary, the policeman arrests the man, ostensibly for vagrancy but also as insane. The man is committed to a "Psychopathic" Hospital along with the frog, who continues serenading the hapless patient. Following his release, the now haggard and destitute man — still carrying the box with the frog inside — notices the construction site where he originally found the box. He joyously dumps it into the new cornerstone for the future "Tregoweth Brown Building" and runs away, finally rid of what has become his burden.

101 years later, in 2056, the Brown Building is being disintegrated by futuristic demolition workers. The box with the frog is discovered again, this time by one of the 21st-century crew members. After envisioning a cash bonanza of his own, the worker absconds with the frog in the box, thus beginning the cycle anew.

== Production notes ==
The cartoon has no spoken dialogue or vocals except by the frog. The frog's vocals are provided by singer and bandleader Bill Roberts. The frog had no name when the cartoon was made, but Chuck Jones later named him Michigan J. Frog after the song "The Michigan Rag", which was written for the cartoon. Jones and his animators studied real-life frogs to achieve the successful transition from an ordinary frog to a high-stepping entertainer. The character became the mascot of The WB television network in the 1990s. In a clip shown in the DVD specials for the Looney Tunes Golden Collection, Jones states that he started calling the character "Michigan Frog" in the 1970s. During an interview with writer Jay Cocks, Jones decided to adopt "J" as the Frog's middle initial, after the interviewer's name.

== Sequel ==
In 1995, Chuck Jones reprised Michigan J. Frog in a cartoon titled Another Froggy Evening, with Jeff McCarthy providing the frog's voice. In Another Froggy Evening, Michigan is shown to have always existed. Men from the Stone Age (during the erection of Stonehenge), Roman Empire (under the reign of "Saladus Caesar"), and American Revolutionary War, all of whom resemble the man from the original short, fail to profit off the singing frog, who still performs early 20th-century-style showtunes regardless of the time period. In some shots, the frog displays a degree of anthropomorphism, but not musical talent, in front of others by willingly hiding himself in his box. Finally, just as Michigan is about to be eaten by a castaway (who also resembles the original man) on a small, deserted island, he is abducted aboard a flying saucer by Marvin the Martian, who discovers the frog understands the Martian language. The frog invites Marvin to hear him sing, and they perform a duet as the saucer flies away.

The background crowd in the Roman Empire includes caricatures of Jones, animated by Warren O'Neill, and Siskel and Ebert, animated by Mort Drucker.

== Inspiration ==
The premise of One Froggy Evening has some similarity to that of the 1944 Columbia Pictures film Once Upon a Time starring Cary Grant in which a dancing caterpillar is kept in a shoebox. It was common for Warner Bros. to parody scenes from well-known live action films for its Merrie Melodies productions. Once Upon a Time, in turn, was based on "My Client Curley", a 1940 radio play adapted by Norman Corwin from a magazine story by Lucille Fletcher. Ol' Rip, a horned toad "discovered" in an 1897 time capsule inside the cornerstone of the Eastland County, Texas courthouse in 1928, is also said to have inspired the premise.

== Reception ==
Film critic Jay Cocks said that the short "comes as close as any cartoon ever has to perfection" in a 1973 Time profile of Chuck Jones. In the 2000 documentary film Chuck Jones: Extremes & Inbetweens – A Life in Animation, filmmaker Steven Spielberg called the short "the Citizen Kane of the animated short".

In 1994, it was voted No. 5 of The 50 Greatest Cartoons of all time by members of the animation field.

== Songs featured ==
About half of the songs performed by the frog were written after he was presumably sealed into the cornerstone, dated 1892.

- "Hello! Ma Baby"

Words and music by Ida Emerson and Joseph E. Howard (1899)

- "The Michigan Rag"

Words and music by Milt Franklyn, Michael Maltese, and Chuck Jones, written for the cartoon

- "Come Back to Éireann"

Words and music by Claribel (pseudonym of Charlotte Alington Barnard) (1866)

- "I'm Just Wild About Harry"

Words and music by Eubie Blake and Noble Sissle, written for the musical Shuffle Along (1921)

- "Throw Him Down, McCloskey"

Words and music by John W. Kelly (1890)

- "The Michigan Rag" reprise
- "Won't You Come Over To My House"

Words by Harry Williams, music by Egbert Van Alstyne (1906)

- "Largo al factotum"

Composed by Gioachino Rossini for the opera The Barber of Seville (1816)

- "Please Don't Talk About Me When I'm Gone"

Words and music by Sidney Clare, Sam H. Stept, and Bee Palmer (1930)

- "Hello! Ma Baby" reprise

== In popular culture ==
- Michigan J. Frog appears in two episodes of Tiny Toon Adventures, as well as two episodes of Sylvester & Tweety Mysteries.
- Michigan J. Frog also cameos in an episode of Animaniacs when a scene from Macbeth is recreated. He is placed into a boiling cauldron along with other cartoon characters. He also appears in the segment "Night of the Living Buttons" in a later episode.
- The film Spaceballs features a scene in which an alien (parodying the film Alien) bursts from a man's chest, dons a straw hat and cane and begins singing "Hello! Ma Baby" (via Bill Roberts' archival recordings) while performing a dance routine very similar to Michigan J. Frog's routine.

== See also ==
- Living entombed animal
- Ol' Rip the Horned Toad, said to be the original inspiration for the cartoon
