= Booth Museum of Natural History =

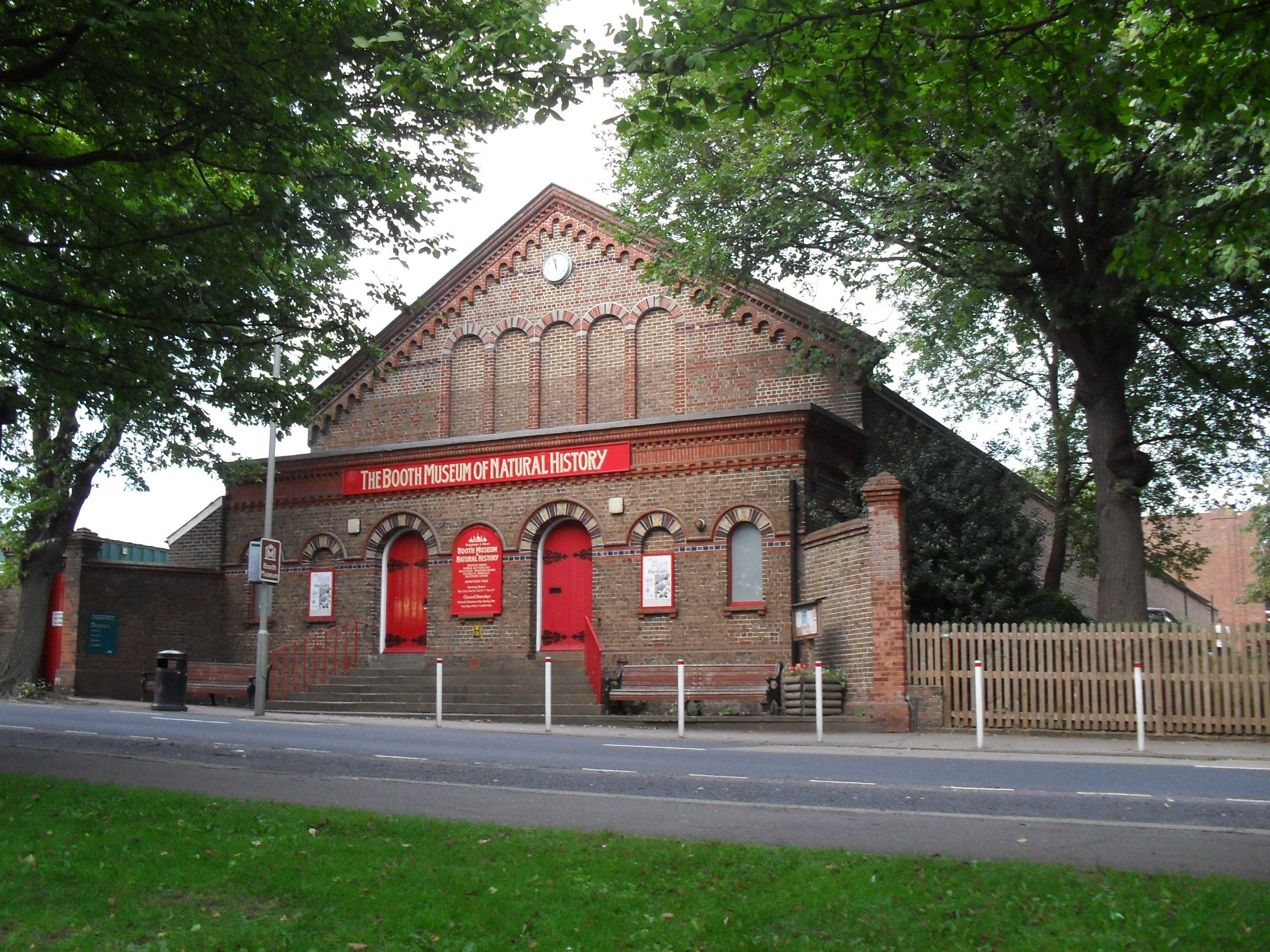
- The museum from the southwest

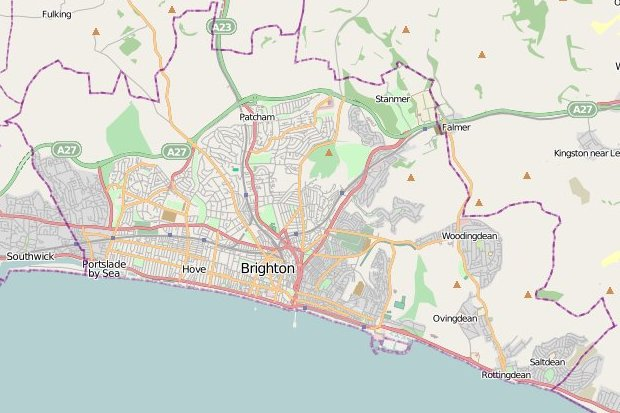
- Location within Brighton and Hove
- Established: 1874
- Location: 194 Dyke Road, Brighton, East Sussex, England BN1 5AA
- Coordinates: 50.8373°N 0.1532°W
- Type: Natural history museum
- Collection size: 500,000 (approx.)
- Public transit access: Brighton railway station; Brighton & Hove Buses routes 14,14C,27
- Website: brightonmuseums.org.uk/booth/

Booth Museum of Natural History is a charitable trust-managed, municipally owned museum of natural history in the city of Brighton and Hove in the South East of England. Its focus is on Victorian taxidermy, especially of British birds, as well as collections focusing on entomology (especially lepidoptera), chalk fossils, skeletons and botany. It is part of "Royal Pavilion & Museums Trust". Admission to the museum is free.

The museum is currently closed due to refurbishment and is due to reopen in February 2027.

== History ==
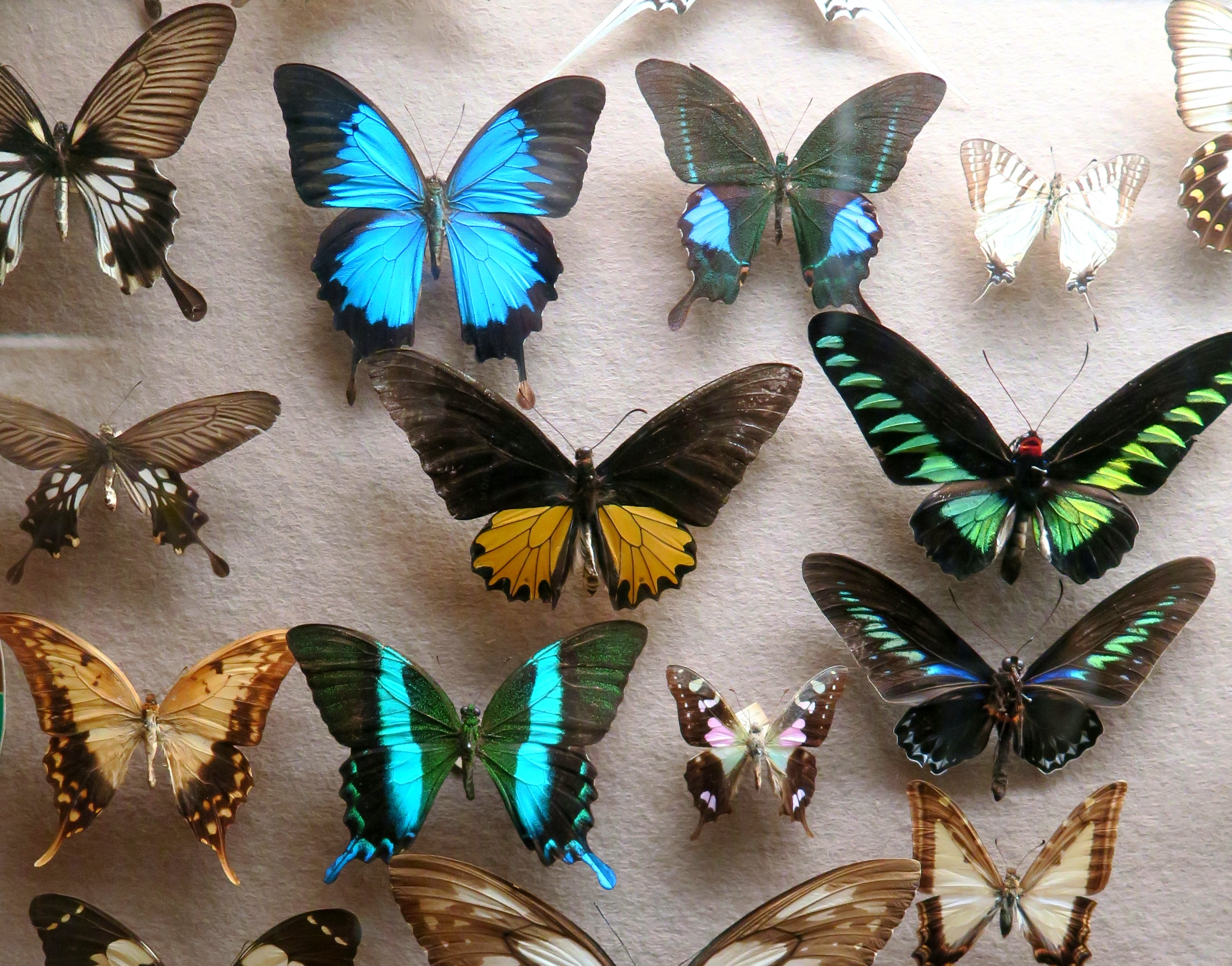
Butterflies exhibit in the museum

The Booth Museum was opened in 1874 by naturalist and collector Edward Thomas Booth. Booth was particularly interested in birds, and it was his ambition, though not fully realized, to collect examples of every bird species found in Britain. Each species collected would include a male, a female, a juvenile and any plumage variations. He presented his bird collection in Victorian-style dioramas that attempted to recreate how birds would appear in the setting of their natural habitat. An example in Booth's own notes describe the Gannet diorama as being 'copied from a sketch [of] the North side of the Bass Rock'. Booth was one of the pioneers of such diorama displays, and his museum, the first to present its collection in this manner in Britain, influenced how other museums would present animal species in their displays.

Booth donated the museum to the city in 1890 with the proviso that the display of over 300 dioramas should not be altered, and it was opened under Brighton civic ownership in 1891. In 1971 the Booth became a Museum of Natural History.

The museum continues to feature the dioramas of British birds in their habitat settings, as well as collections of butterflies, and British fossils and animal bones. Other items have been added to the museum's collection throughout the years, and it is now home to a collection of approximately 700,000 insects: 73,000 vertebrate related specimens (including osteology, taxidermy and oology), 35,000 fossils and minerals, 60,000 plants and 5,000 microscopic slides.

The collections also include other notable collectors from the region. These include the herbarium and geological specimens from Sir Alexander Crichton. Crichton was chief physician to Tsar Alexander I and the Dowager empress Maria Feodorovna from 1803 to 1819, and as a member of the Linnean Society of London, collected plant and geological specimens in his spare time. They also include the South and Central American butterflies collected by Arthur Hall over 13 expeditions to the Americas between 1901 and 1939. This collection takes up over thirty cabinets, and includes several hundred type specimens. It also includes a 54 volume unpublished treatise on the butterflies of South and Central America.

An unknown species of pterosaur was discovered in the fossil collection of the museum in 2020.

The museum closed in April 2025 for a planned one year refit. It is due to reopen in February 2027.

== Exhibits ==
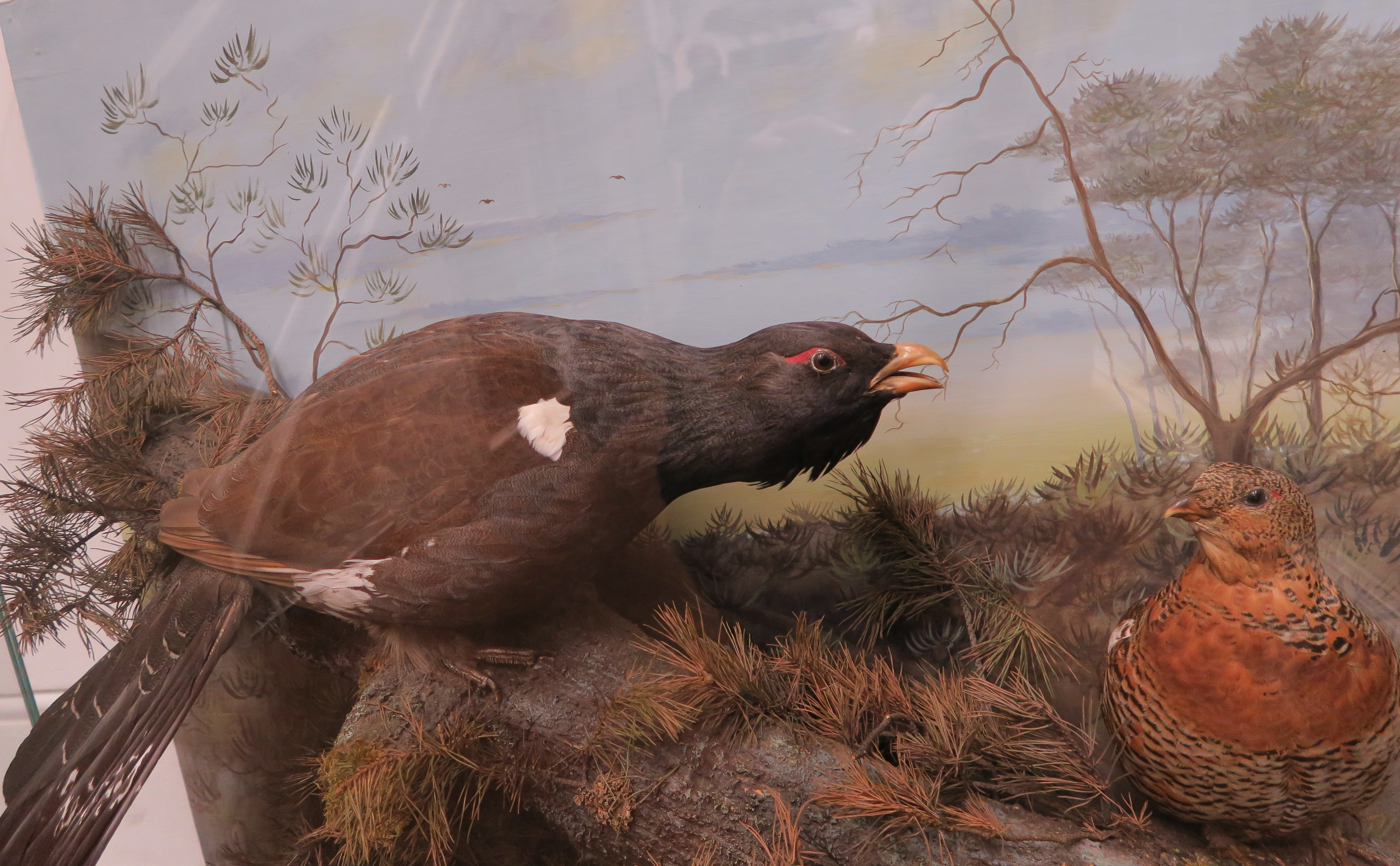
A bird diorama at the Booth Museum of Natural History

The museum's collection of taxidermied birds is one of the largest in the country. The museum also has the skeleton collection of Fredrick W Lucas, featuring birds and mammals from around the world, including primates, dolphins as well as extinct species such as the dodo and thylacine. The largest skeleton is that of an orca found beached between the piers in Brighton in 1935.

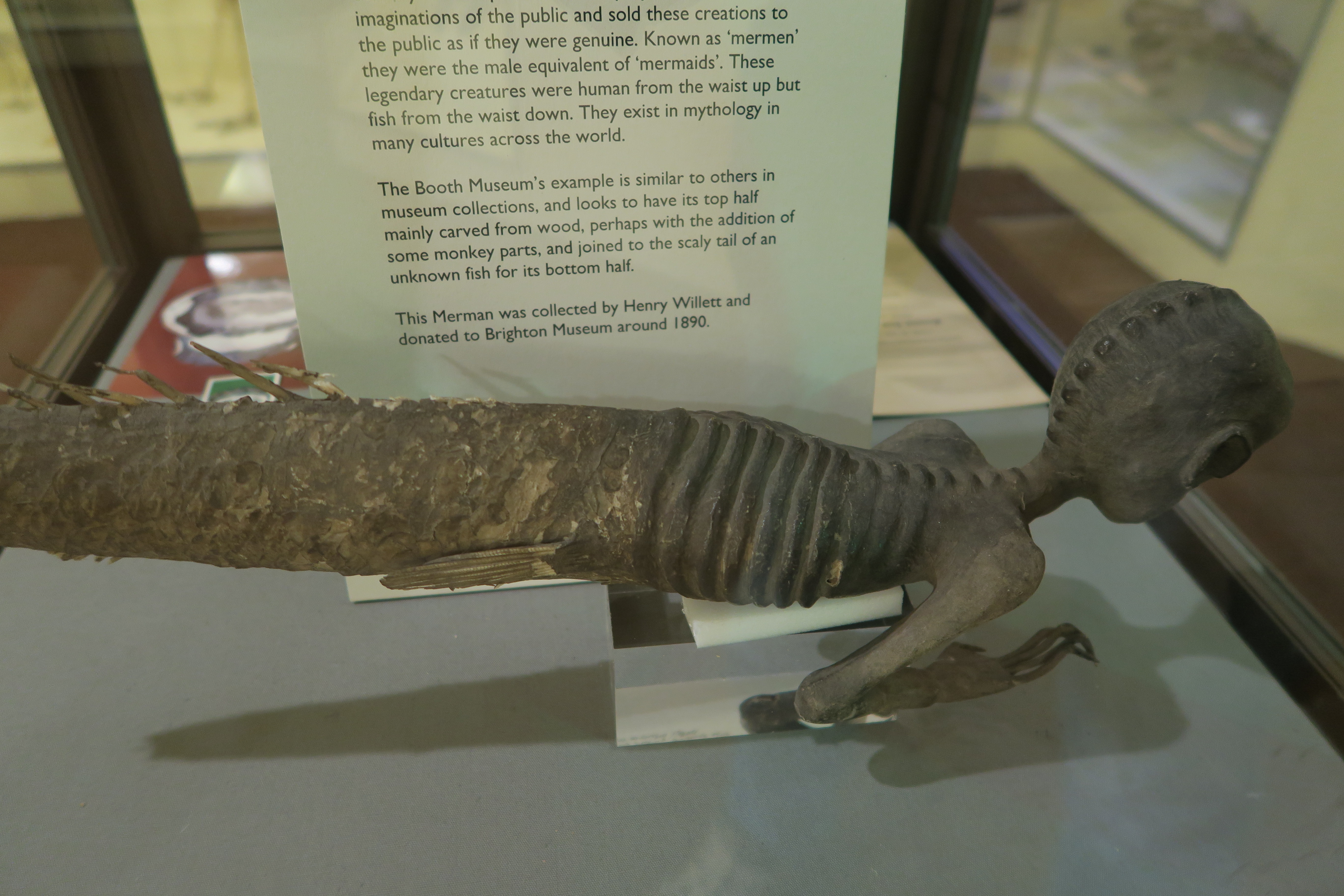
A Victorian hoax "merman"

Victorian curiosities such as a hoax merman and a "Toad in a Hole" are also found in the museum. Also included in the display are fossils and minerals. Insects displayed include over 650 types of butterfly.

Several of the exhibits were used as references for CGI animations in the 2019 television fantasy drama His Dark Materials. In early 2024, the museum added a new diorama - the first in 92 years - inspired by the city's wildlife, named 'Life in the Garden'.

== See also ==
- Grade II listed buildings in Brighton and Hove: A–B
