= The Hunted (Star Trek: The Next Generation) =

- Star Trek: The Next Generation episode
- Episode no.: Season 3 Episode 11
- Directed by: Cliff Bole
- Written by: Robin Bernheim
- Cinematography by: Marvin Rush
- Production code: 159
- Original air date: January 8, 1990
- Running time: 45 minutes

Guest appearances
- Jeff McCarthy as Roga Danar; James Cromwell as Prime Minister Nayrok; Colm Meaney as Miles O'Brien; J. Michael Flynn as Zayner; Andrew Bicknell as Wagnor; Majel Barrett as Computer Voice (uncredited)

Episode chronology
← Previous "The Defector"	Next → "The High Ground"
- Star Trek: The Next Generation season 3

"The Hunted" is the 11th episode of the third season of the syndicated American science fiction television series Star Trek: The Next Generation, and the 59th episode of the series overall.

Set in the 24th century, the series follows the adventures of the Starfleet crew of the Federation starship Enterprise-D. In this episode, as Captain Picard (Patrick Stewart) and his staff meet with the leaders of the planet Angosia III who are petitioning for Federation membership, they find themselves learning more than expected about the Angosians when they offer to help capture a local escaped prisoner.

== Plot ==
The Enterprise is investigating the planet Angosia III as a candidate for entry into the Federation. Captain Picard (Patrick Stewart) is approached by Prime Minister Nayrok (James Cromwell), who asks for help in apprehending Roga Danar (Jeff McCarthy), a convict who has escaped on a transport ship from their prison colony on Lunar V. Danar eludes the Enterprise for several minutes through stealth and misdirection, but eventually he is located in an escape pod and beamed aboard the Enterprise. When security try to take him into custody he fights back; it takes five officers to subdue him and incarcerate him in the brig.

The empathic Counselor Troi (Marina Sirtis) reads little aggression from Danar, finding it unlikely that he could be so violent. The crew finds that despite being a prisoner, he has no criminal record. Danar explains that he was one of many soldiers who received biological enhancements and psychological conditioning, greatly increasing their combat abilities; and rather than attempt to reverse the conditioning after the war, the government imprisoned them all. Nayrok tells Picard that the soldiers were found to be unsuited for civilized society in peacetime and "resettled" on Lunar V. Declaring the veterans' treatment an internal matter that is none of Picard's concern, he insists that Danar to be returned to the colony.

During the transfer from the Enterprise to an Angosian police transport, Danar manages to escape. Easily evading security, he cripples the Enterprise by causing an explosion in one of the Jefferies tubes, disabling her sensor systems. With the Enterprise blind, Danar beams aboard the police transport. Taking control, he attacks the Lunar V colony and rescues several of his fellow inmates.

Nayrok pleads with the Enterprise for help. Picard beams down with an away team but refuses to help, questioning the morality of how they've treated their soldiers. In the middle of this argument, Danar and his rebels storm the government building. Nayrok asks Picard to intervene against this insurrection. Picard elects instead to depart, reminding Nayrok that he himself declared the issue an internal matter. He tells the Angosian government the Angosians must make a choice about what to do with their veterans, and invites them to reapply for Federation membership when their society is ready.

== Releases ==
The episode was released with Star Trek: The Next Generation season three DVD box set, released in the United States on July 2, 2002. This had 26 episodes of Season 3 on seven discs, with a Dolby Digital 5.1 audio track. It was released in high-definition Blu-ray in the United States on April 30, 2013.

The episode was released in Japan on LaserDisc on July 5, 1996, in the half season set Log. 5: Third Season Part.1 by CIC Video. This included episodes up to "A Matter of Perspective" on 12-inch double sided optical discs. The video was in NTSC format with both English and Japanese audio tracks.

== Reception ==
In a 2010 re-view, Zack Handlen gave the episode a grade A.

Keith R.A. DeCandido gave the episode a rating of 6 out of 10.

In 2016, Vox rated this one of the top 25 essential episodes of all Star Trek.
