= Charles Dawson =

British archaeologist and fraudster (1864–1916)

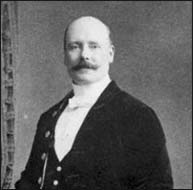
- Charles Dawson
- Born: 11 July 1864; Preston, Lancashire, England
- Died: 10 August 1916 (aged 52); Lewes, Sussex, England
- Occupation: Solicitor
- Known for: Piltdown Man hoax

Charles Dawson (11 July 1864 – 10 August 1916) was a British amateur archaeologist who claimed to have made a number of archaeological and palaeontological discoveries that were later exposed as frauds. These forgeries included the Piltdown Man (Eoanthropus dawsoni), a unique set of bones that he claimed to have found in 1912 in Sussex. Many technological methods such as fluorine testing indicate that this discovery was a hoax, and Dawson, the only person with the skill and knowledge to generate this forgery, was a major suspect.

The eldest of three sons, Dawson moved with his family from Preston, Lancashire, to Hastings, Sussex, when he was still very young. He initially studied law, in order to become his father's apprentice and then pursued a hobby of collecting and studying fossils.

He made a number of seemingly important fossil finds. Amongst these were teeth from a previously unknown species of mammal, later named Plagiaulax dawsoni in his honour; three new species of dinosaur, one later named Iguanodon dawsoni; and a new form of fossil plant, Salaginella dawsoni. The Natural History Museum awarded him the title of "honorary collector". He was then elected fellow of the Geological Society for his discoveries and a few years later, he joined the Society of Antiquaries of London. Dawson died prematurely from pernicious anaemia in 1916 at Lewes, Sussex.

== Alleged discoveries ==
In 1889, Dawson was a co-founder of the Hastings and St Leonards Museum Association, one of the first voluntary museum friends' groups organised in Britain. Dawson worked on a voluntary basis as a member of the Museum Committee, in charge of the acquisition of artifacts and historical documents. His interest in archaeology developed and he had an uncanny knack for making spectacular discoveries, leading The Sussex Daily News to name him the "Wizard of Sussex".

In 1893, Dawson investigated a curious flint mine full of prehistoric, Roman and medieval artifacts in the Lavant Caves, near Chichester, and probed two tunnels beneath Hastings Castle. In the same year, he presented the British Museum with a Roman statuette from Beauport Park that was made, uniquely for the period, of cast iron. Other discoveries followed, including a strange form of hafted Neolithic stone axe and a well-preserved ancient timber boat.

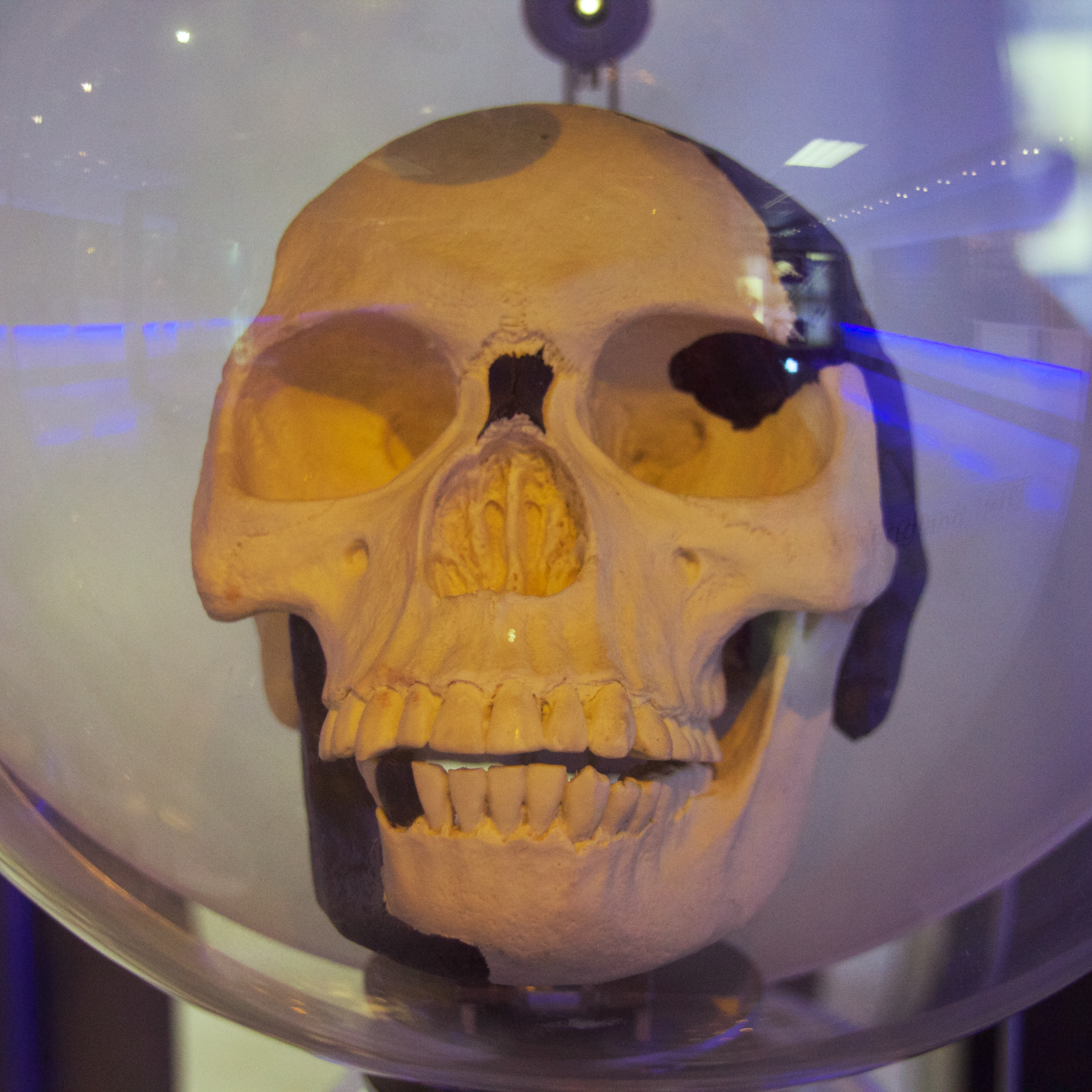
A replica of the Piltdown Man skull.

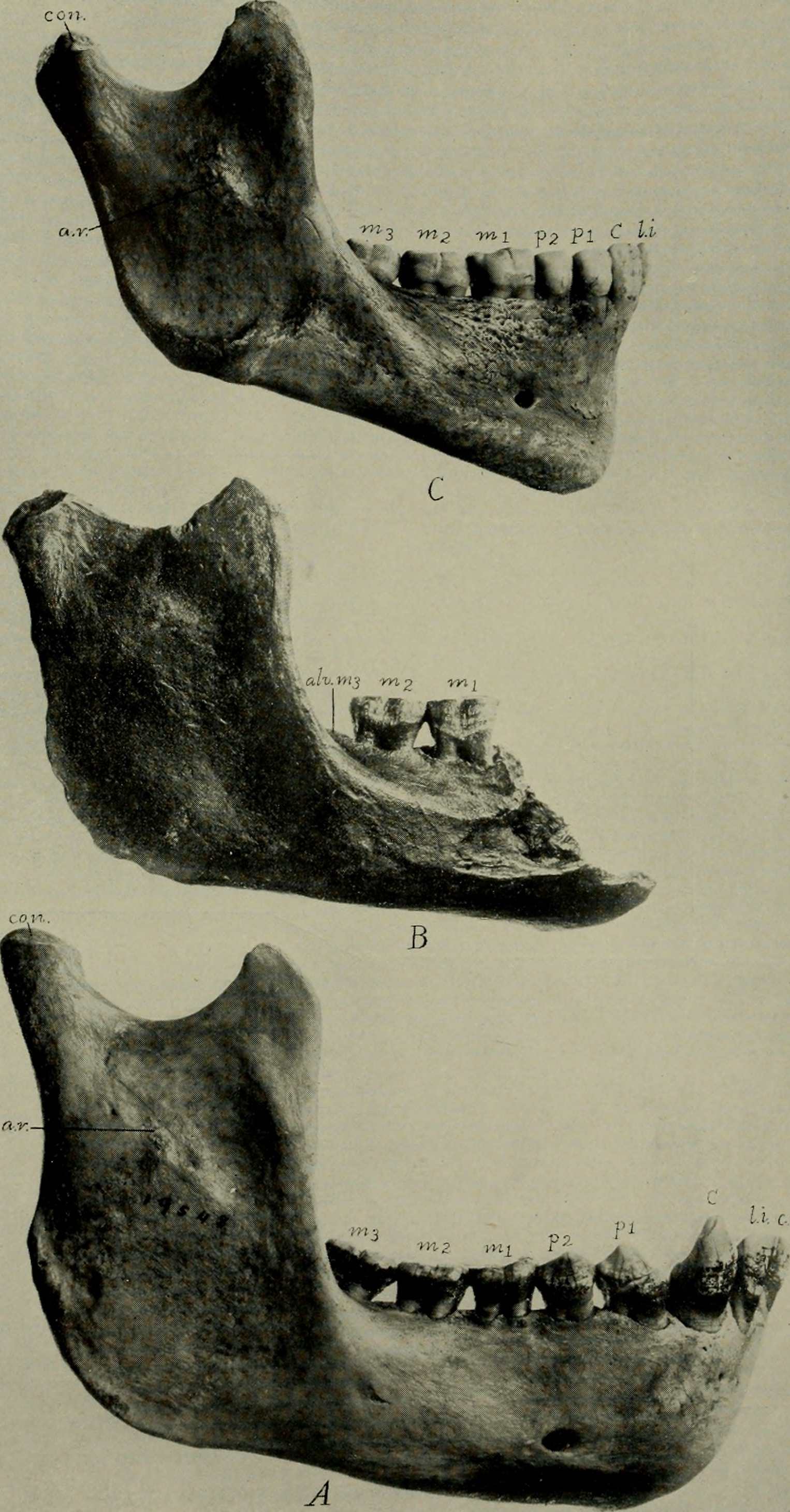
The Piltdown Man jaw (B) compared to the jaws of a female orangutan (A) and a modern man (C).

He analysed ancient quarries, re-examined the Bayeux Tapestry, and produced the first conclusive study of Hastings Castle. He later found fake evidence for the final phases of Roman occupation in Britain at Pevensey Castle in Sussex. Investigating unusual elements of the natural world, Dawson presented a petrified toad inside a flint nodule, discovered a large supply of natural gas at Heathfield in East Sussex, reported on a sea-serpent in the English Channel, observed a new species of human, and found a strange goldfish/carp hybrid. It was even reported that he was experimenting with phosphorescent bullets as a hindrance to Zeppelin attacks on London during the First World War.

In appreciation for the donation of fossils Dawson provided to the British Museum, he was given the title of "honorary collector" and in 1885, he was elected a fellow of the Geological Society as a result of his numerous discoveries. He was then elected a fellow of the Society of Antiquaries of London in 1895. He was now Charles Dawson F.G.S., F.S.A at the age of 31, without a university degree to his name. Dawson died without receiving a knighthood.

His most famous "find" was the 1912 discovery of the Piltdown Man which was billed as the "missing link" between humans and other great apes. Following his death in 1916, no further "discoveries" were made at Piltdown. Questions about the Piltdown find were raised from the beginning, first by Arthur Keith, but also by palaeontologists and anatomists from the United States and Europe. Defence of the fossils was led by Arthur Smith Woodward at the Natural History Museum in London. The debate was rancorous at times and the response to those disputing the finds often became personally abusive. Challenges to Piltdown Man arose again in the 1920s, but were again dismissed.

== Posthumous analysis ==
In 1949, further questions were raised about the Piltdown Man and its authenticity, which led to the conclusive demonstration that Piltdown was a hoax in 1953. Since then, a number of Dawson's other finds have also been shown to be forged or planted.

In 2003, Miles Russell of Bournemouth University published the results of his investigation into Dawson's antiquarian collection and concluded that at least 38 specimens were clear fakes. Russell has noted that Dawson's whole academic career appears to have been "one built upon deceit, sleight of hand, fraud and deception, the ultimate gain being international recognition." Among these were the teeth of a reptile/mammal hybrid, Plagiaulax dawsoni, purportedly "found" in 1891 (and whose teeth had been filed down in the same way that the teeth of Piltdown Man were to be some 20 years later); the so-called "shadow figures" on the walls of Hastings Castle; a unique hafted stone axe; the Bexhill boat (a hybrid seafaring vessel); the Pevensey bricks (allegedly the latest datable "finds" from Roman Britain); the contents of the Lavant Caves (a fraudulent "flint mine"); the Beauport Park "Roman" statuette (a hybrid iron object); the Bulverhythe hammer (shaped with an iron knife in the same way as the Piltdown elephant bone implement would later be); a fraudulent "Chinese" bronze vase; the Brighton "toad in the hole" (a toad entombed within a flint nodule); the English Channel sea serpent; the Uckfield horseshoe (another hybrid iron object) and the Lewes prick spur. Of his antiquarian publications, most demonstrate evidence of plagiarism or at least naive referencing as Russell wrote: "Piltdown was not a 'one-off' hoax, more the culmination of a life's work."

=== Piltdown Man ===
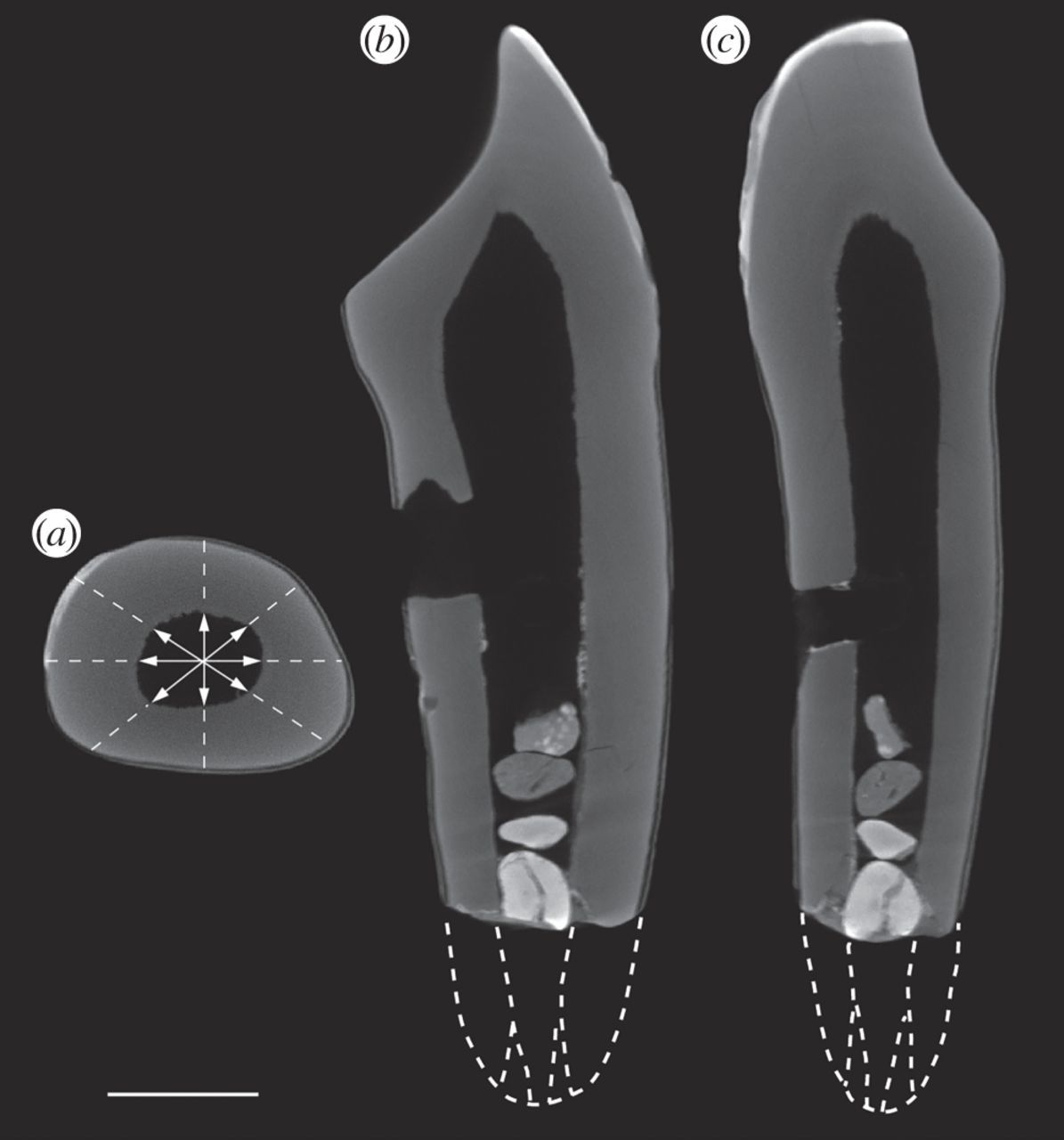
Three CT scans of the Piltdown Man's canine that display the root of the tooth which was compared to apes (a), the loss of enamel (b & c), and dotted lines that indicate how the undamaged root would appear (b & c).

Dawson claimed to have discovered a collection of fossils that have been dug up in Piltdown, Sussex, including an ape-like jawbone and a human-like skull. However, after his death, it was proved that the remains were evidently forged. For years, the creator of these remains was unknown, though it was then determined, through a meticulous inspection of his finds and collections, that Charles Dawson himself was most likely responsible for this forgery.

==== Unmasking the hoax ====
As more human fossils were discovered, it appeared that they had little similarities with the Piltdown Man. The Piltdown Man was then re-examined through new, rigorous technological methods which ultimately uncovered the hoax. Fluoride-based tests, chemical tests that date fossils by the amount of fluorine buried bones absorb from the soil, were used to date the Piltdown remains. This test, validated by a nitrogen-based test, dated the skull to not more than 50,000 years old, far more recent than Dawson proposed, and dated the jawbone to decades old. This meant that the Piltdown Man could not have been an ancestor of modern humans. Furthermore, chemical tests displayed that the fossils had been artificially stained by iron and chromium to appear medieval. Also, CT scans used to analyze the inside of the bones indicated that many bones were loaded with gravel and were then sealed with putty. Even more so, X-rays indicate that the teeth have been flattened by filing or grinding to appear like human teeth. Lastly, in 2016, a team of British researchers used DNA studies to provide added evidence for the provenance of Piltdown Man. It was determined that the Piltdown I jawbone and the Piltdown II molar tooth came from a single orangutan and the cranial bones came from primitive humans. Despite the consistency of the findings, analyses of the material exhibit the forger's lack of professional training, as the materials had fractured bones, putty that set too fast, and cracked teeth.

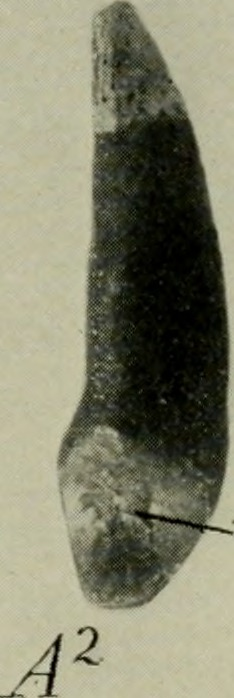
Displays the flattened, worn surface canine tooth of the Piltdown Man.

==== Revealing the forger ====
Most agree that the Piltdown Man was forged by a single individual, and that this was most probably Charles Dawson. Dawson was the suspected perpetrator in this hoax for many reasons. First, Dawson had previous history of deception: he was responsible for about 38 forgeries, plagiarized a historical account of Hastings Castle, and had pretended to act on behalf of the Sussex Archeological Society. However, most people were unaware of this. Second, he was majorly involved in the Piltdown findings. He initiated the story of the Piltdown finds and was the one who contacted Woodward about them. He was the sole person to have seen the Piltdown II site and never disclosed the facts about this site; the fact that the techniques used to create both Piltdown I and Piltdown II were so similar suggests a single forger. Also, he was the only person present at every discovery; nothing was ever discovered at the site when he was not physically present and no other fossils were found after he died. Third, not only did he have access to the museum and antiquarian shops that carried these objects, he was also a popular collector, an amazing networker, and knew what the British scientific community expected in a missing link between apes and humans.

It has been suggested that Dawson's motive for this forgery had been his strong desire for scientific recognition and to join the archeological Royal Society. Between 1883 and 1909, Dawson wrote 50 publications though none were important enough to elevate his career. In 1909, he wrote a letter to Smith Woodward, with an unhappy heart, saying that he wanted to uncover a significant discovery though he never seemed to come across one. Just six weeks later, Dawson's wife wrote a letter to the Home Secretary, pleading on behalf of Dawson's expertise. Sorrowful that he never unearthed a major discovery, he created the Piltdown Man which resulted in his election to the Royal Society.

Although there is not a substantial amount of evidence, some believe that he received aid from other experts such as Teilhard de Chardin, who discovered a fake canine, Sir Arthur Smith Woodward, Keeper of the Department at the Natural History Museum, co-author of the announcement of Piltdown II, and Martin Hinton, a zoologist at the Natural History Museum where, in 1970, a trunk of his was discovered containing bones stained to make them appear old, using the same technique as for Piltdown Man.
