= National Casket Company =

American manufacturer of caskets and funeral equipment

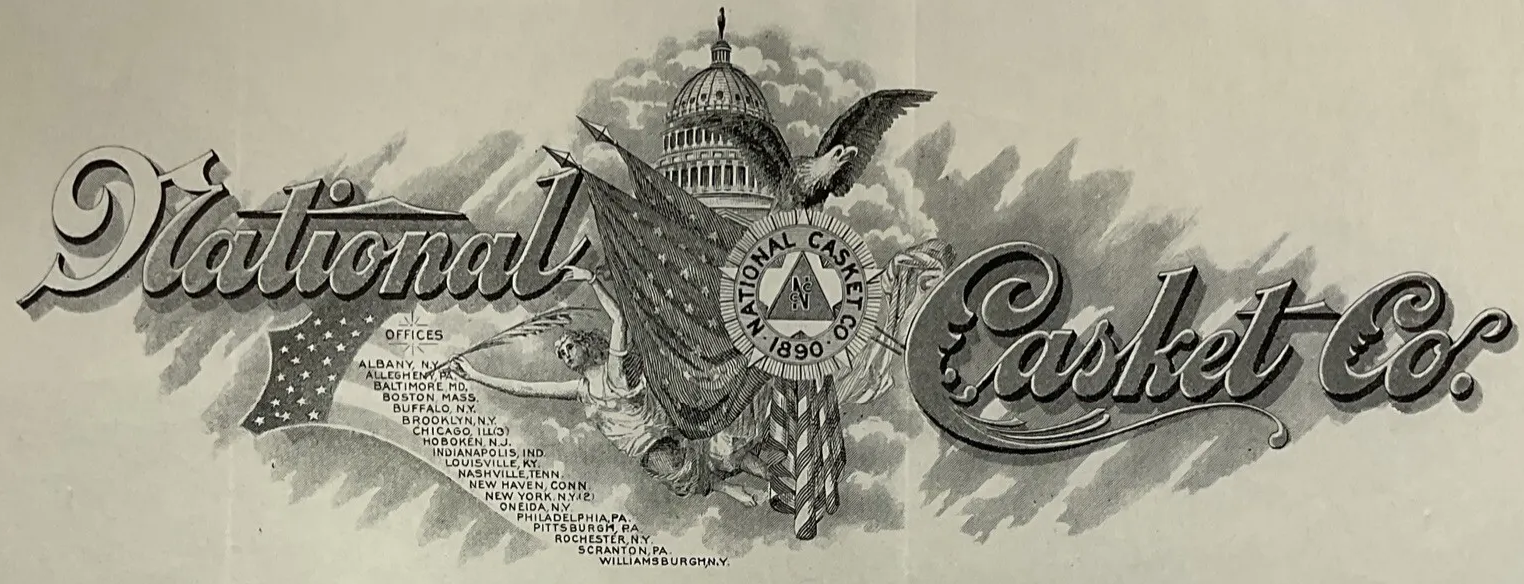
- Logo from a 1903 bill
- Company type: Private
- Industry: Death care industry
- Predecessors: Stein Manufacturing Company; Hamilton, Lemmon and Arnold Company; Chappell, Chase, Maxwell and Company
- Founded: 1880
- Defunct: c. 1980s or after
- Headquarters: Oneida, New York
- Products: Caskets, hearses, embalming fluid

The National Casket Company was an American manufacturer of caskets and other funeral equipment. It was formed in 1880 by a merger of the Stein Manufacturing Company of Rochester, New York; the Hamilton, Lemmon, and Arnold Company of Pittsburgh, Pennsylvania; and Chappell, Chase, Maxwell, and Company of Oneida, New York. It adopted the National Casket Company name in 1890. The company increased through a series of acquisitions and, by 1951, was the world's largest manufacturer of caskets. It was merged with Fred Richmond's Walco National Corporation in 1969 but declined after Richmond's imprisonment on fraud charges. The National Casket Company closed sometime during or after the 1980s.

== Early years ==
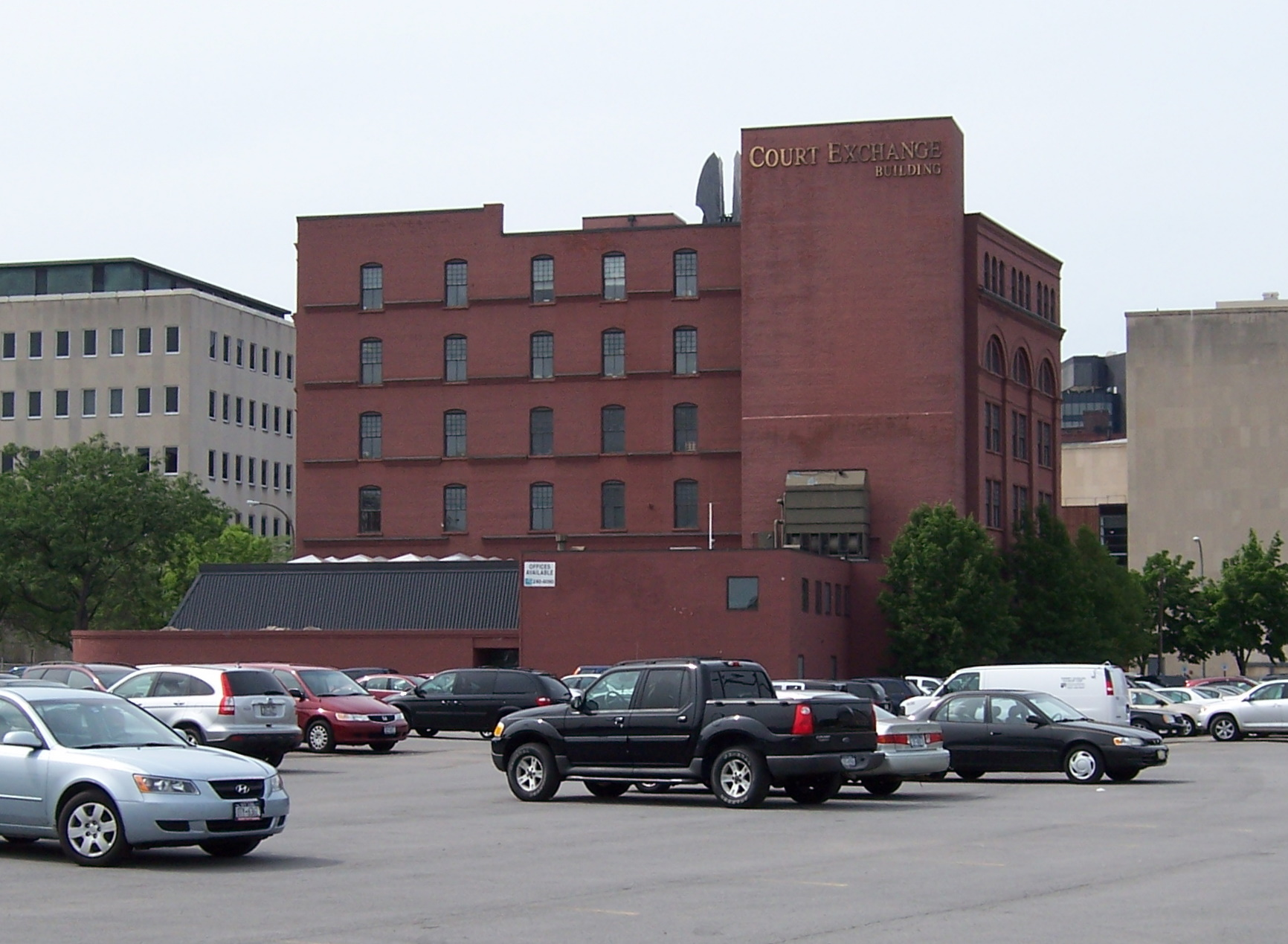
The former National Casket Company building in Rochester, New York; which came into the business at its foundation via Stein Manufacturing

The company came into being in 1880 as a merger of the three leading casket-makers of the period: the Stein Manufacturing Company of Rochester, New York; the Hamilton, Lemmon, and Arnold Company of Pittsburgh, Pennsylvania; and Chappell, Chase, Maxwell, and Company of Oneida, New York. It was incorporated under the New York State Manufacturing Corporation Act of 1848 and had an initial capital of $3 million, soon increased to $6 million. The company was headquartered in Oneida, and its first president and general manager was C. William Chappell, who had started his career in Oneida as a clerk before opening a clothing store. He had purchased, with Benjamin E. Chase and John F. Tuttle, an undertaker in 1876, which grew into Chappell, Chase, Maxwell, and Company.

By 1881, the new company had opened branches in New York City and Syracuse. The company took on the National Casket Company name in 1890. It had absorbed the Boston Casket Company of Boston, Massachusetts; the Maryland Burial Case Company of Baltimore, Maryland; and the D.E. Chase Company of Albany, New York; by 1891.

== Prosperity in the early 20th century ==
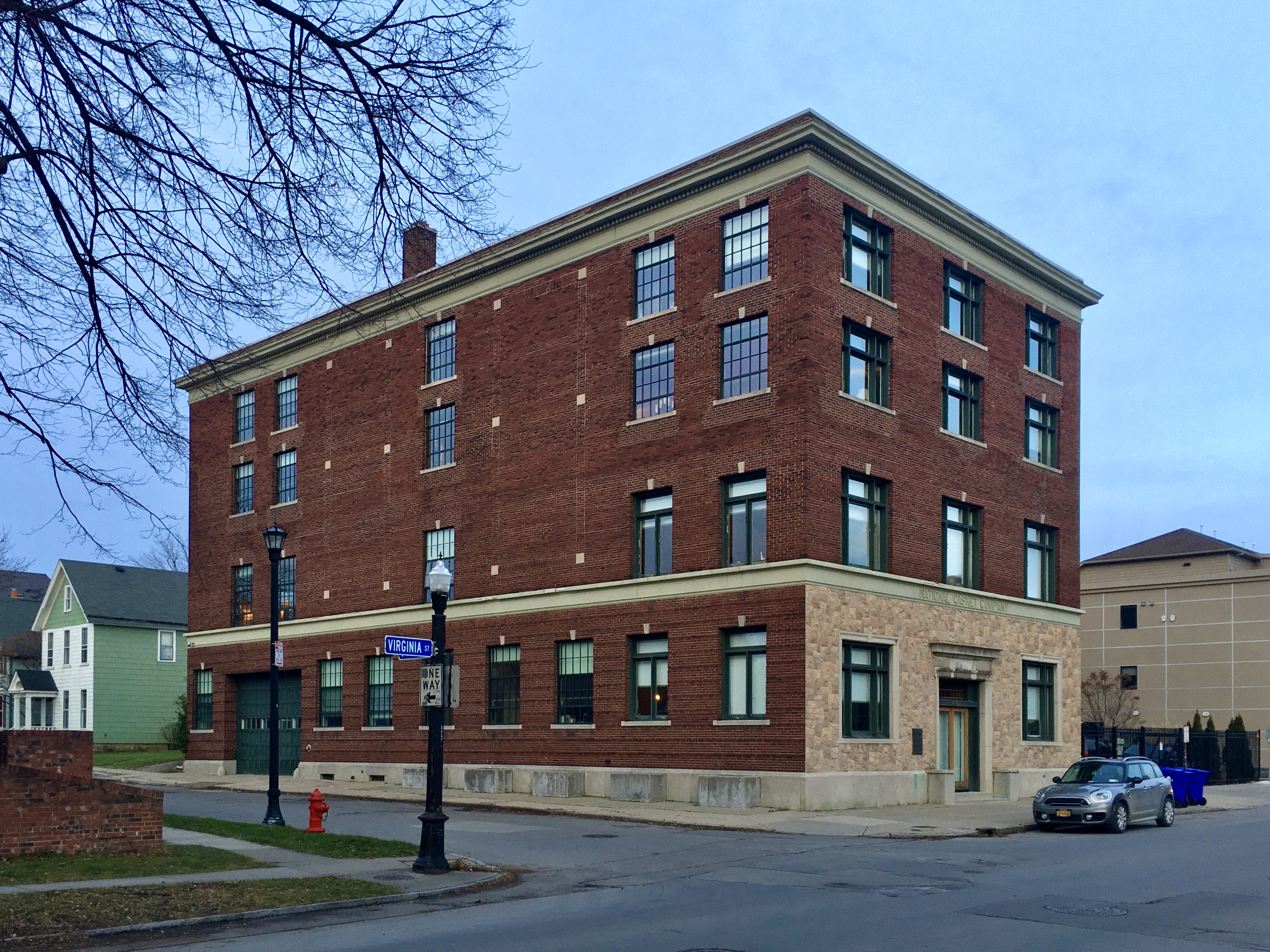
Former showroom and warehouse in Buffalo, New York, built in 1923

By 1901 the National Casket Company had acquired further businesses in Philadelphia, Pennsylvania; Nashville, Tennessee; Louisville, Kentucky; Indianapolis, Indiana; Chicago, Illinois; and New Haven, Connecticut. The company made the hand-carved mahogany casket for President William McKinley's 1901 funeral (he was buried in a different casket). In the early 1900s the company opened a factory in Niagara, Toronto (it closed in 1973).

Chappell died in a motor car accident in July 1909, and afterward, William D. Hamilton of Pittsburgh managed the company. the company began a national magazine advertising campaign that year. It was one of the leading advertisers in the Confederate Veteran and had won first prize at a Southern heritage parade in 1908 with a float featuring two teenagers dressed as a Confederate officer and his plantation-owning wife standing next to a casket. In 1912 the company advertised "Confederate gray broadcloth-covered caskets" for the burial of Confederate Army veterans.

In addition to caskets, the National Casket Company made other funeral equipment, including hearses and embalming fluid. In 1912 two of the company's embalmers traveled from Boston to Halifax to assist with the reception of bodies carried by the CS Mackay-Bennett from the scene of the sinking of the Titanic. Baseball player Harry Fritz was an associate for the company after retiring from sport in 1915. In 1916 a flood in Asheville, North Carolina, inundated a company warehouse, leading to caskets floating in the floodwater next to the bodies of victims of the disaster. In 1919 the company purchased a warehouse at Scottdale, Pennsylvania, from the United States Casket Company (the site went on to close in 1971).

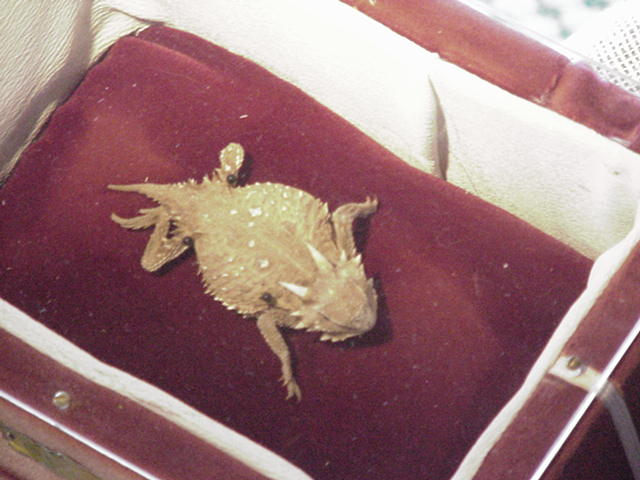
Ol' Rip in his casket

Philip B. Heintz of Boston took over from Hamilton as manager of the National Casket Company in 1922. The company pioneered a standard branch layout containing offices, a warehouse, and several "selection rooms" for clients to choose from the company's products, all within a single building. During the 1920s, the company was a distributor of funeral cars made by the Kissel Motor Car Company, selling around 200 a year. the company was a distributor of In his 1924 A Magician Among Spirits the escapologist Harry Houdini recalled successfully escaping from a casket made by the company. The company had challenged Houdini to make an escape from a heavy-duty hickory coffin whose lid had been secured with 6-inch (150 mm) screws. After the 1929 death of Ol' Rip the Horned Toad the National Casket Company provided a casket for display of his body. In 1944 one of the company's suppliers was the piano maker Steinway & Sons, who had diversified into coffin manufacture. The National Casket Company was a pioneer in the use of fiberglass-reinforced plastic coffins in lieu of more expensive bronze versions.

By 1951 the National Casket Company was the largest manufacturer of caskets and other funeral supplies in the world. It had branches in 34 cities east of the Rocky Mountains and operated 15 factories. At this time the president of the company was Howard M. Tuttle, son of John F. Tuttle, and the general manager and first vice-president was Leo Stein. The company remained headquartered in New York state but its main office facility was in Boston. The Oneida factory closed in 1967, its equipment having become outdated (the building burned down in 2006).

== Merger with Walco and decline ==
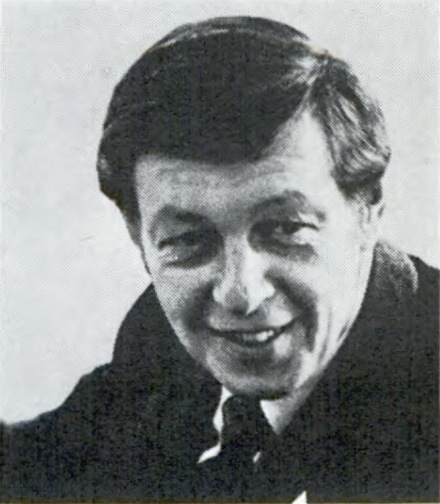
Fred Richmond

U.S. Congressman Fred Richmond's Walco National Corporation merged with the National Casket Company in 1969, in one of its first major moves towards diversification. At the time National Casket was the second-largest American manufacturer of caskets. Walco made a large amount of money by buying stakes in other companies that did not want to be associated with the firm and charging them a premium to buy them back. Richmond was imprisoned on fraud charges in 1982.

In 1976 the company was one of the two main employers in Garrard County, Kentucky, employing 248 people on an annual payroll of $1.5 million. The company was sold by Walco to Gulf and Western Industries in 1980 for $12.5 million. Gulf and Western had purchased Wallace Metal Products, which made coffin furniture, in 1979 and was subsequently investigated by the Federal Trade Commission on monopoly grounds. The National Casket Company changed hands several times in the 1980s before eventually closing.
