= Maggie Cline =

American singer (1857 - 1934)

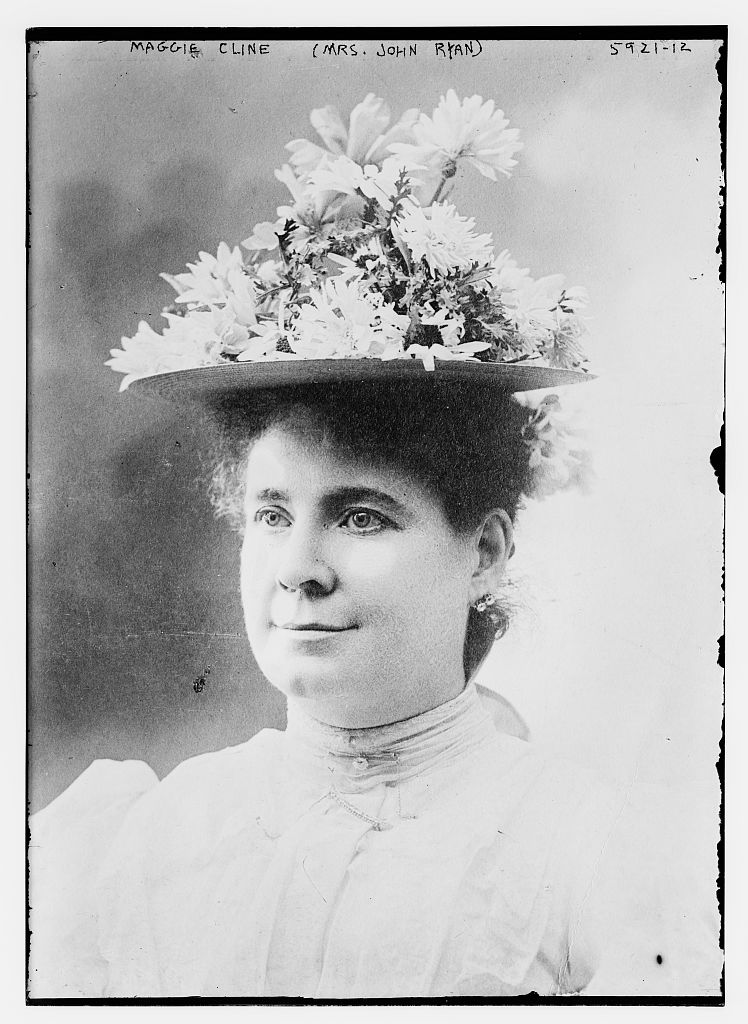
Maggie Cline

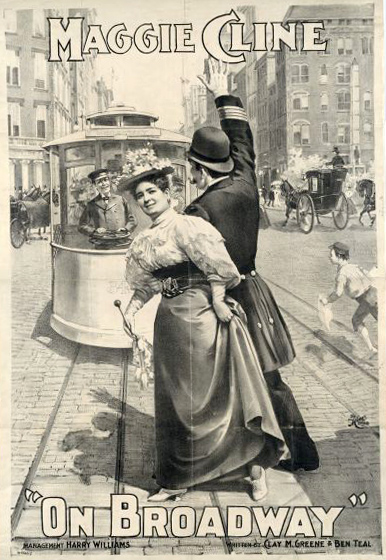
Poster for On Broadway, 1896.

Maggie Cline (January 1, 1857 – June 11, 1934) was an American vaudeville singer, active across the United States in the late nineteenth century, known as "The Irish Queen" and "The Bowery Brunhilde".

== Biography ==
Cline was born in Haverhill, Massachusetts on January 1, 1857. Her parents were Irish immigrants. After working in a shoe factory as a child, she left home for Boston at a teenager where she began her career performing at the Boylston Museum for six dollars a week; a sum much larger than what she had made at the shoe factory. She eventually joined a burlesque troupe, Snellbaker & Benson's Majestics. She married John Ryan, the owner of a café, in 1888. After a long career, she retired from the stage in 1917. She died in Fair Haven, New Jersey, on June 11, 1934.

== Career ==
As typical for vaudeville, she traveled across the United States, playing in small towns and cities, but most frequently appeared in New York City. Her repertoire consisted of Irish-themed rough and tumble songs and skits, performed in a deep brogue. Early in her career, her trademark song was "Mary Ann Kehoe" about an Irish girl pursued by two lovers—her performance of the song was notable for the extent of her stage action.

The song most identified with Cline is John W. Kelly's "Throw Him Down, McCloskey" (1890), a comic song about a 47-round prize fight between two Irishmen. "McCloskey" was typically performed with appropriate loud noises from behind the stage and from the audience, while Cline shadow-boxed a re-enactment as she sang. The number was so popular that when she tried to phase it out of her act, audiences called for it until she gave it to them. The song was featured in the 1955 short cartoon One Froggy Evening. She continued in the 1880s and 1890s to perform primarily in New York, notably at Tony Pastor's. She starred in two Broadway productions, The Prodigal Butler in 1893 and On Broadway in 1896.
