= I'm Just Wild About Harry =

1921 song by Noble Sissle and Eubie Blake

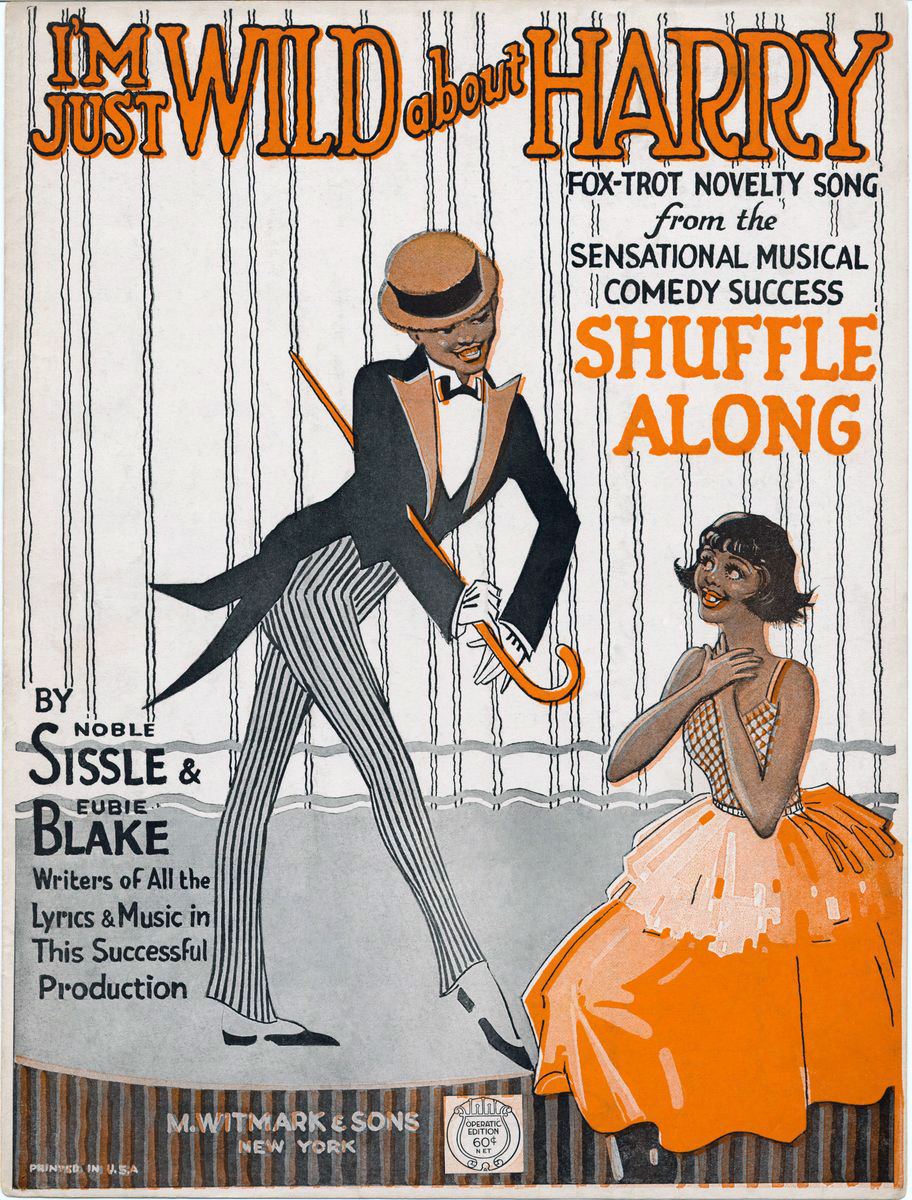
- Cover page for "I'm Just Wild About Harry", 1921

Single by Marion Harris with Isham Jones Orchestra
- B-side: My Cradle Melody
- Published: July 1, 1921 by M. Witmark & Sons, New York
- Released: August 1922
- Recorded: July 1922
- Studio: Brunswick Studios, New York City
- Genre: Popular music, Broadway show tune
- Length: 2:50
- Label: Brunswick 2309
- Composer: Eubie Blake
- Lyricist: Noble Sissle

Audio sample
- Instrumental version of "I'm Just Wild About Harry" by the Vincent Lopez Orchestra (Edison 50988), recorded May 17, 1922. Duration 3:54.: file; help

"I'm Just Wild About Harry" is a song written in 1921 with lyrics by Noble Sissle and music by Eubie Blake for the Broadway musical Shuffle Along.

"I'm Just Wild About Harry" was the most popular number of the production, which was the first financially successful Broadway play to have African-American writers and an all African-American cast. The song broke what had been a taboo against musical and stage depictions of romantic love between African-Americans.

Originally written as a waltz, Blake rewrote the number as a foxtrot at performer Lottie Gee's request. The result was a simple, direct, joyous, and infectious tune enhanced onstage by improvisational dancing. In 1948, Harry S Truman selected "I'm Just Wild About Harry" as his campaign song for the United States presidential election of 1948. Its success in politics led to a popular revival.

== Background ==
Both "I'm Just Wild About Harry" and the show Shuffle Along broke racial taboos. During the early 20th century African-Americans were excluded from most mainstream theater in the United States: white Vaudeville refused to book more than one African-American act on a bill and for over a decade no Broadway show used African-American performers at all. Blake and Sissle met F. E. Miller and Aubrey Lyles for the first time at a fundraising benefit for the National Association for the Advancement of Colored People in 1920. Vaudeville's exclusionary practices limited bills to one African-American act per night, so as a result the two leading African-American acting teams knew of each other only by reputation. The four performers agreed that the only feasible way for African-Americans to return to Broadway with dignity would be musical comedy. Miller proposed they collaborate.

The resulting show adapted plot and characters from Miller and Aubrey's Vaudeville comic sketches with music by Blake and Sissle. Although the music of Shuffle Along was new to the public, only three compositions were actually written for the production: "I'm Just Wild About Harry", "Bandana Days", and "Love Will Find A Way". The other songs used in the show were material that Blake and Sissle had tried unsuccessfully to sell to Tin Pan Alley. "I'm Just Wild About Harry" and "Love Will Find a Way" in particular were politically risky for the era.

"If anything approaching a love duet was introduced in a musical comedy, it had to be broadly burlesqued," recalled black poet and lyricist James Weldon Johnson. "The reason ... lay in the belief that a love scene between two Negroes could not strike a white audience except as ridiculous." – Philip Furia and Michael Lasser, America's Songs: The Stories Behind the Songs of Broadway, Hollywood, and Tin Pan Alley

The title and chorus of the musical's most famous number challenge that taboo: I'm just wild about Harry and he's just wild about me is a clear statement of mutual romantic interest. Sissle and Blake risked the public's rejection by shedding most of the racial stereotypes that had been the norm for theatrical performances.

== Creation ==
"I'm Just Wild About Harry" underwent a complete rewrite during rehearsals and was nearly cut from the show. Blake's original version of the song was a Viennese waltz, but according to the authors of America's Songs, performer Lottie Gee encouraged rewriting the number as an up-tempo one-step. Blake disliked the suggestion and feared it would ruin his waltz but capitulated after Sissle agreed with Gee.

Audiences did not respond well to the revised version during early performances. Blake was on the verge of dropping the number from the show when a dancer was taken ill and had to be replaced. The understudy was a singer who did not know the steps, so when he was unable to follow the routine he ignored it and improvised. America's Songs quotes Sissle's recollection of how the performance saved the song: "He dropped out of line and with a jive smile and a high-stepping routine of his own, he stopped the show cold."

== Structure ==
Composer Alec Wilder calls "I'm Just Wild About Harry" a "strong, direct, simple song, the principal device of which is a strong fourth beat tied to the down beat". The song moves in short melodic bursts characteristic of the era: lighthearted but rhythmic.

It's of the genre of "Hallelujah", "Fine and Dandy" and all those cut-time theater rhythm songs. It uses a lot of step-wise writing and only one note out of its C-major scale, a d sharp. For a theater song it is not rangy, being only an octave and a third.

The tightly rhymed lyrics comprise a straightforward set of comparisons that border on comic exaggeration.

The heavenly blisses
Of his kisses
Fill me with ecstasy.
He's sweet just like chocolate candy
And just like honey from the bee.

Yet Furia and Lasser describe the song's overall impact as "an infectious delight".

Within the context of the play, the number occurs early in the second act when the leading lady declares her love for the leading man. Her father is the wealthiest man in town, which poses obstacles to the match. The overall plot concerns a mayoral race in all-black Jimtown where two dishonest grocery store owners vie for political office. One of the corrupt grocers wins the race shortly afterward and appoints the other chief of police. Harry leads the community protest that returns the two grocers to their store, and wins the girl.

== Reception ==
Shuffle Along was a significant theatrical success that "ended more than a decade of systematic exclusion of blacks from the Broadway stage". The show opened in New York City at Daly's 63rd Street Music Hall on May 23, 1921, and ran 504 performances. The venue was actually a converted lecture hall that lacked a proper stage or orchestra pit. The show overcame financial straits and a poor location to become "the first all-black musical to enjoy a long run and be treated as more than an oddity."

On the New York opening night, the audience loved the show. Influential critics like Alan Dale, George Jean Nathan, and Heywood Broun were highly enthusiastic. Gradually Shuffle Along built up a cult status. So big were the crowds that the police had trouble controlling the traffic. Eventually they had to make Sixty-third a one-way street. A black show was back on Broadway, even if 63rd Street, a long way uptown, was barely Broadway! In Eubie Blake's words, 'It wasn't Broadway but we made it Broadway.'"

"I'm Just Wild About Harry" was the most popular number of the show. Blake conducted the show's orchestra and recorded the song for the Victor label. Noble Sissle's 1937 recording for the Victory label altered the original tone considerably in order to showcase the talents of clarinetist Sidney Bechet. Other early recordings include those by Benny Krueger, Louis Mitchell and Paul Whiteman.

In 2014, it returned to Broadway in a revival of Shuffle Along.

== Use in other media ==
Judy Garland sang the piece as one of several songs in a minstrel show in the Metro-Goldwyn-Mayer musical Babes in Arms (1939). It was sung by Priscilla Lane in the American 1939 gangster drama, The Roaring Twenties, starring James Cagney and Humphrey Bogart. Alice Faye sang it with Louis Prima's band in the 1939 film Rose of Washington Square.

In 1948, "I'm Just Wild About Harry" underwent a revival when Harry S. Truman selected it as his campaign song for the presidency of the United States. Republicans and some Democrats that year joked, "I'm just mild about Harry." The next year Al Jolson performed it in the film Jolson Sings Again (lip-synced by Larry Parks as Jolson) and the song became a jazz standard. This return to popularity briefly reunited Blake and Sissle for the first time since 1933. In 1955, the song again appeared in the Warner Brothers cartoon short One Froggy Evening as one of the songs sung by Michigan J. Frog during his dance routine. Kathy Linden released a version of the song on her 1958 album, That Certain Boy. Writing about American popular songs in 1972, Wilder and Maher call "I'm Just Wild About Harry" the only enduringly popular song from Shuffle Along.

In season 4, episode 6 of the historical drama series, Downton Abbey, jazz bandleader Jack Ross sings the song at a surprise birthday party for the Earl of Grantham. In 2020, Morgxn covered the song for Freeform's The Thing About Harry, which was featured in promos and at the end of the film.
