= List of animated short films =

This is a list of animated short films. The list is organized by decade and year, and then alphabetically. The list includes theatrical, television, and direct-to-video films with less than 40 minutes runtime. For a list of films with over 40 minutes of runtime, see List of animated films.

== 1870s-1890s ==
Name	Year	Country	Animation style
La Rosace Magique	1877	France	Hand-Painted Animation
Le singe musicien	1878	France	Hand-Painted Animation
Le Clown et ses chiens	1892	France	Hand-Painted Animation
Un bon bock	1892	France	Hand-Painted Animation
Pauvre Pierrot	1892	France	Hand-Painted Animation
Autour d'une cabine	1894	France	Hand-Painted Animation

== 1900s-1910s ==
Name	Year	Country	Animation style
Humorous Phases of Funny Faces	1906	United States	Cutout Animation
Katsudō Shashin	1907	Japan	Anime
Fantasmagorie	1908	France	Traditional Animation
The Clown and His Donkey	1910	United Kingdom	Silhouette Animation
Little Nemo	1911	United States	Traditional Animation
The Cameraman's Revenge	1912	Russia	Stop-motion Animation
The Artist's Dream	1913	United States	Traditional Animation
The Grasshopper and the Ant	1913	Russia	Stop-motion Animation
How a Mosquito Operates	1914	United States	Traditional Animation
Gertie the Dinosaur	1914	United States	Traditional Animation
Krazy Kat and Ignatz Mouse: A Duet, He Made Me Love Him	1916	United States	Traditional Animation
Krazy Kat & Ignatz Mouse Discuss the Letter 'G'	1916	United States	Traditional Animation
Krazy Kat Invalid	1916	United States	Traditional Animation
Battle of a Monkey and a Crab	1917	Japan	Anime
The Dinosaur and the Missing Link: A Prehistoric Tragedy	1917	United States	Stop-motion Animation
Imokawa Mukuzo Genkanban no Maki	1917	Japan	Anime
Namakura Gatana	1917	Japan	Anime
Momotaro	1918	Japan	Anime
The Sinking of the Lusitania	1918	United States	Traditional Animation
Urashima Tarō	1918	Japan	Anime
Feline Follies	1919	United States	Traditional Animation

== 1920s ==
=== 1920 ===
Name	Country	Technique
The Best Mouse Loses	United States	Traditional Animation
Cheating the Piper	United States	Traditional Animation
The Circus	United States	Traditional Animation
The Debut of Thomas Cat	United States	Traditional Animation
A Family Affair	United States	Traditional Animation
The Great Cheese Robbery	United States	Traditional Animation
Love's Labor Lost	United States	Traditional Animation

=== 1921 ===
Name	Country	Technique
The Awful Spook	United States	Traditional Animation
The Centaurs	United States	Traditional Animation
The First Circus	United States	Traditional Animation
Rhythmus 21	Germany	Abstract Animation
The Wireless Wire-Walkers	United States	Traditional Animation

=== 1922 ===
Name	Country	Technique
Cinderella	United States	Traditional Animation
The Four Musicians of Bremen	United States	Traditional Animation
Little Red Riding Hood	United States	Traditional Animation
The Mad Locomotive	United States	Traditional Animation
Puss in Boots	United States	Traditional Animation

=== 1923 ===
Name	Country	Technique
Alice's Wonderland	United States	Combination of live-action and Traditional animation
The Einstein Theory of Relativity	United States	Traditional Animation
Felix in Hollywood	United States	Traditional Animation
Symphonie diagonale	Weimar Republic	Traditional Animation

=== 1924 ===
Name	Country	Technique
Dog Treat	China	Traditional Animation
Interplanetary Revolution	Soviet Union	Cut-Out Animation
New Year	China	Traditional Animation
Oh Mabel	United States	Traditional Animation
Alice's Day at Sea	United States	Combination of live-action and Traditional animation
Felix Finds Out	United States	Traditional Animation
Alice's Spooky Adventure	United States	Combination of live-action and Traditional animation

=== 1925 ===
Name	Country	Technique
Alice Gets Stung	United States	Combination of live-action and Traditional animation
Alice Solves the Puzzle	United States	Combination of live-action and Traditional animation
Alice the Toreador	United States	Combination of live-action and Traditional animation
A Barnyard Frolic	United States	Traditional Animation
Bokays and Brickbatz	United States	Traditional Animation
The Cat and the Kit	United States	Traditional Animation
Closer than a Brother	United States	Traditional Animation
Dentist Love	United States	Traditional Animation
Feather Duster	United States	Traditional Animation
Felix the Cat Trifles with Time	United States	Traditional Animation
The Window Washers	United States	Traditional Animation

=== 1926 ===
Name	Country	Technique
Alice's Orphan	United States	Combination of live-action and Traditional animation
Dog Gone	United States	Traditional Animation
My Old Kentucky Home	United States	Traditional Animation

=== 1927 ===
Name	Country	Technique
All Wet	United States	Traditional Animation
Empty Socks	United States	Traditional Animation
Flim Flam Films	United States	Traditional Animation
Great Guns!	United States	Traditional Animation
The Mechanical Cow	United States	Traditional Animation
The Non-Stop Fright	United States	Traditional Animation
The Ocean Hop	United States	Traditional Animation
Oh Teacher	United States	Traditional Animation
Rail Rode	United States	Traditional Animation
La Reine des Papillons	France	Stop-Motion Animation
River of Doubt	United States	Traditional Animation
Sleigh Bells	United States	Traditional Animation
Small Town Sheriff	United States	Traditional Animation
Stomach Trouble	United States	Traditional Animation
The Stork Exchange	United States	Traditional Animation
Trolley Troubles	United States	Traditional Animation
Whys and Other Whys	United States	Traditional Animation

=== 1928 ===
Name	Country	Technique
Animal Olympic Games	Japan	Anime
Africa Before Dark	United States	Traditional Animation
Bright Lights	United States	Traditional Animation
Dinner Time	United States	Traditional Animation
Eskimotive	United States	Traditional Animation
Fiery Firemen	United States	Traditional Animation
The Fox Chase	United States	Traditional Animation
The Gallopin' Gaucho	United States	Traditional Animation
Ghosts Before Breakfast	Weimar Republic	Combination of stop-motion animation and live-action
Hungry Hoboes	United States	Traditional Animation
Ko-Ko's Earth Control	United States	Combination of live-action and Traditional animation
Mighty Taro's Reckless Training	Japan	Anime
Momotaro the Undefeated	Japan	Anime
Oh What a Knight	United States	Traditional Animation
Poor Papa	United States	Traditional Animation
Steamboat Willie	United States	Traditional Animation
Tall Timber	United States	Traditional Animation
Woos Whoopee	United States	Traditional Animation

=== 1929 ===
Name	Country	Technique
Alpine Antics	United States	Traditional Animation
The Barn Dance	United States	Traditional Animation
The Barnyard Battle	United States	Traditional Animation
Bosko, the Talk-Ink Kid	United States	Combination of live-action and Traditional animation
Chinatown, My Chinatown	United States	Traditional Animation
A Close Call	United States	Traditional Animation
Eveready Harton in Buried Treasure	United States	Traditional Animation
Farm Relief	United States	Traditional Animation
The Haunted House	United States	Traditional Animation
Hell's Bells	United States	Traditional Animation
The Jazz Fool	United States	Traditional Animation
Jungle Jingles	United States	Traditional Animation
Jungle Rhythm	United States	Traditional Animation
The Karnival Kid	United States	Traditional Animation
The Merry Dwarfs	United States	Traditional Animation
Mickey's Choo-Choo	United States	Traditional Animation
Mickey's Follies	United States	Traditional Animation
The Opry House	United States	Traditional Animation
Plane Crazy	United States	Traditional Animation
The Plowboy	United States	Traditional Animation
Race Riot	United States	Traditional Animation
Ratskin	United States	Traditional Animation
The Skeleton Dance	United States	Traditional Animation
Sick Cylinders	United States	Traditional Animation
Springtime	United States	Traditional Animation
El Terrible Toreador	United States	Traditional Animation
Weary Willies	United States	Traditional Animation
When the Cat's Away	United States	Traditional Animation
Wild Waves	United States	Traditional Animation
Yanky Clippers	United States	Traditional Animation
Yankee Doodle Boy	United States	Traditional Animation

== 2020s ==
=== 2020 ===
Name	Country	Technique
Angela's Christmas Wish	Ireland	Computer Animation
Burrow	United States	Traditional Animation
If Anything Happens I Love You	United States	Traditional Animation
Kapaemahu	United States	Traditional/computer
Lamp Life	United States	Computer Animation
Loop	United States	Computer Animation
Out	United States	Computer Animation
Playdate with Destiny	United States	Traditional Animation
There's a Monster in My Kitchen	Ireland	Traditional Animation
Zog and the Flying Doctors	United Kingdom	Computer Animation

=== 2021 ===
Name	Country	Technique
22 vs. Earth	United States	Computer Animation
Blush	United States	Computer Animation
Ciao Alberto	United States	Computer Animation
Come Home	United States	Computer Animation
The Displeasure	Canada	Stop-motion Animation
Far from the Tree	United States	Traditional/computer
Freebird	Canada/United States	Traditional Animation
Minions & Monsters	United States	Computer Animation
Monster Pets	United States	Computer Animation
Nona	United States	Computer Animation
Precious Templeton: A Pony Tale	United States	Traditional Animation
Robin Robin	United Kingdom	Stop-motion Animation
Save Ralph	United States	Stop-motion Animation
Sprite Fright	United States	Computer Animation
Twenty Something	United States	Traditional Animation
Us Again	United States	Computer Animation
The Windshield Wiper	United States, Spain	Traditional/computer

=== 2022 ===
Name	Country	Technique
Animal Attraction	United States	Computer Animation
Arctic Song	Canada	Traditional Animation
The Bad Guys in Maraschino Ruby	United States	Computer Animation
The Boy, the Mole, the Fox and the Horse	United Kingdom	Traditional Animation
For Gunter's Eyes Only	United States	Computer Animation
Gotta Get Some Tissue!	United States	Traditional/computer
Post Modern Minion	United States	Computer Animation

=== 2023 ===
Name	Country	Technique
27	France	Traditional Animation
Carl's Date	United States	Computer Animation
Dora and the Fantastical Creatures	United States	Computer Animation
Harvey	Canada	Traditional Animation
Lackadaisy	United States	Traditional Animation
Where Rabbits Come From	France	Traditional Animation
The Spider Within: A Spider-Verse Story	United States	Computer Animation
Once Upon a Studio	United States	Traditional/computer/live-action
Mog’s Christmas	United Kingdom	Traditional Animation
Mooned	United States	Computer Animation
War Is Over!	United States	Computer Animation

=== 2024 ===
Name	Country	Technique
Bottle George	Japan	Stop-Motion Animation
Beautiful Men	Belgium	Stop-Motion Animation
Benny's Birthday	United States	Computer Animation
Fly Hard	United States	Computer Animation
Game Over and Over	United States	Computer Animation
Inkwo for When the Starving Return	Canada	Stop-Motion Animation
Magic Candies	Japan	Computer Animation
Maybe Elephants	Canada, Norway	Traditional Animation
Midnight Mission	United States	Computer Animation
Mother's Child	Netherlands	Traditional/computer
Self	United States	Computer/stop-motion
Sing: Thriller	United States	Computer Animation
Sulayman	Philippines	Traditional Animation
Quota	Netherlands	Computer Animation
Yuck!	France	Traditional Animation

=== 2025 ===
Name	Country	Technique
A Sparrow's Song	Germany	Computer Animation
The Bad Guys: Little Lies and Alibis	United States	Computer Animation
Forevergreen	United States	Computer Animation
How Are You?	France	Computer Animation
The Girl Who Cried Pearls	Canada	Stop-Motion Animation
Ordinary Life	France, Japan	Traditional Animation
The Quinta's Ghost	Spain	Computer Animation
Stone of Destiny	Czech Republic	Traditional Animation
Snow Bear	United States	Traditional Animation
To the Woods	France	Traditional Animation
Trash	France	Computer Animation
Cardboard	United Kingdom	Computer Animation
What We Leave Behind	Canada	Traditional Animation
Order Up	United States	Traditional Animation
Teenage Mutant Ninja Turtles: Chrome Alone 2 – Lost in New Jersey	United States	Computer Animation
Nollaí	Ireland, Wales	Computer Animation

=== 2026 ===
Name	Country	Technique
Daffy Season	United States	Computer Animation
Lilo & Scratch	United States	Traditional/Computer
The Lovers	Philippines	Traditional Animation
Optimus Prime: Awakening	United States	Computer Animation
Pigeons	Switzerland, United States	Traditional Animation
Violet and Marlowe Rob A Bank	United States	Computer Animation
What Is Dyslexia?	United Kingdom	Computer Animation

== By studio ==
=== Disney ===
- Steamboat Willie (1928), Walt Disney and Ub Iwerks
- The Gallopin' Gaucho (1929), Ub Iwerks
- The Barn Dance (1929), Walt Disney
- Plane Crazy (1929), Walt Disney
- The Opry House (1929), Walt Disney
- When the Cat's Away (1929), Walt Disney
- The Barnyard Battle (1929), Walt Disney
- The Plowboy (1929), Walt Disney
- The Karnival Kid (1929), Walt Disney
- The Skeleton Dance (1929), Walt Disney
- Mickey's Follies (1929), Wilfred Jackson
- El Terrible Toreador (1929), Walt Disney
- Mickey's Choo-Choo (1929), Walt Disney
- The Jazz Fool (1929), Walt Disney
- Springtime (1929), Walt Disney
- Hell's Bells (1929), Ub Iwerks
- Jungle Rhythm (1929), Walt Disney
- The Haunted House (1929), Walt Disney
- The Merry Dwarfs (1929), Walt Disney
- Wild Waves (1929), Burt Gillett
- Fiddlin' Around (1930), Walt Disney
- The Barnyard Concert (1930), Walt Disney
- The Cactus Kid (1930), Walt Disney
- Mickey's Revue (1932), Wilfred Jackson
- The Whoopee Party (1932), Wilfred Jackson
- Flowers and Trees (1932), Burt Gillett
- Babes in the Woods (1932), Burt Gillett
- Building a Building (1933), David Hand
- The Mad Doctor (1933), David Hand
- Birds in the Spring (1933), David Hand
- Mickey's Mellerdrammer (1933), Wilfred Jackson
- Ye Olden Days (1933), Burt Gillett
- Father Noah's Ark (1933), Wilfred Jackson
- Three Little Pigs (1933), Walt Disney
- Mickey's Mechanical Man (1933), Wilfred Jackson
- Mickey's Gala Premier (1933), Burt Gillett
- Old King Cole (1933), David Hand
- Lullaby Land (1933), Wilfred Jackson
- The Pied Piper (1933), Wilfred Jackson
- Giantland (1933), Burt Gillett
- The Night Before Christmas (1933), Wilfred Jackson
- The China Shop (1934), Wilfred Jackson
- The Grasshopper and the Ants (1934), Wilfred Jackson
- Playful Pluto (1934), by Burt Gillett
- Funny Little Bunnies (1934), Wilfred Jackson
- The Big Bad Wolf (1934), Burt Gillett
- Gulliver Mickey (1934), Burt Gillett
- The Wise Little Hen (1934), Wilfred Jackson
- Mickey's Steam Roller (1934), David Hand
- The Flying Mouse (1934), David Hand
- Orphan's Benefit (1934), Burt Gillett
- Peculiar Penguins (1934), Wilfred Jackson
- The Goddess of Spring (1934), Wilfred Jackson
- The Dognapper (1934), David Hand
- The Band Concert (1935), Wilfred Jackson
- Mickey's Service Station (1935), Ben Sharpsteen
- Thru the Mirror (1936), David Hand
- Mickey's Rival (1936), Wilfred Jackson
- Donald and Pluto (1936), Ben Sharpsteen
- Don Donald (1937), Walt Disney
- Clock Cleaners (1937), Ben Sharpsteen
- The Old Mill (1937), Wilfred Jackson
- Lonesome Ghosts (1937), Ben Sharpsteen
- Donald's Better Self (1938), Jack King
- Moth and the Flame (1938), Burt Gillett
- Donald's Nephews (1938), Jack King
- Mickey's Trailer (1938), Ben Sharpsteen
- Brave Little Tailor (1938), Bill Roberts and Burt Gillett
- Ferdinand the Bull (1938), Dick Rickard
- Donald's Lucky Day (1939), Jack King
- Society Dog Show (1939), Bill Roberts
- Mickey's Surprise Party (1939), Hamilton Luske
- The Practical Pig (1939), Dick Rickard
- Goofy and Wilbur (1939), Dick Huemer
- The Ugly Duckling (1939), Jack Cutting
- The Pointer (1939), Clyde Geronimi
- Mr. Duck Steps Out (1940), Jack King
- The Art of Skiing (1941), Jack Kinney
- Der Fuehrer's Face (1942), Jack Kinney
- Education for Death (1943), Clyde Geronimi
- Reason and Emotion (1943), Bill Roberts
- Chicken Little (1943), Clyde Geronimi
- Hockey Homicide (1945), Jack Kinney
- Chip an' Dale (1947), Jack Hannah
- The Brave Engineer (1950), Jack Kinney
- Motor Mania (1950), Jack Kinney
- Morris the Midget Moose (1950), Jack Hannah and Charles A. Nichols
- Lambert the Sheepish Lion (1952), Jack Hannah
- Susie the Little Blue Coupe (1952), Clyde Geronimi
- The Little House (1952), Wilfred Jackson
- The Simple Things (1953), Charles A. Nichols
- Melody (1953), Ward Kimball and Charles A. Nichols
- Working for Peanuts (1953), Jack Hannah
- Toot, Whistle, Plunk and Boom (1953), C. August Nichols and Ward Kimball
- Ben and Me (1953), Hamilton Luske
- Pigs Is Pigs (1954), Jack Kinney
- Social Lion (1954), Jack Kinney
- Grand Canyonscope (1954), C. August Nichols
- Chips Ahoy (1956), Jack Kinney
- Hooked Bear (1956), Jack Hannah
- How to Have an Accident in the Home (1956), Charles A. Nichols
- In the Bag (1956), Jack Hannah
- The Truth About Mother Goose (1957), Wolfgang Reitherman and Bill Justice
- Paul Bunyan (1958), Les Clark
- Donald in Mathmagic Land (1959), Hamilton Luske
- How to Have an Accident at Work (1959), Charles A. Nichols
- Goliath II (1960), Wolfgang Reitherman
- Donald and the Wheel (1961), Hamilton Luske
- Aquamania (1961), Wolfgang Reitherman
- The Litterbug (1961), Hamilton Luske
- A Symposium on Popular Songs (1962), Bill Justice
- Winnie the Pooh and the Honey Tree (1966), Wolfgang Reitherman
- Donald's Fire Survival Plan (1966), Les Clark
- Scrooge McDuck and Money (1967), Hamilton Luske
- Winnie the Pooh and the Blustery Day (1968), Wolfgang Reitherman
- It's Tough to Be a Bird (1969), Ward Kimball
- Winnie the Pooh and Tigger Too (1974), John Lounsbery
- The Small One (1978), Don Bluth
- Winnie the Pooh Discovers the Seasons (1981), Rick Reinert
- Fun with Mr. Future (1982), Darrell Van Citters
- Winnie the Pooh and a Day for Eeyore (1983), Rick Reinert
- Mickey's Christmas Carol (1983), Burny Mattinson
- Sport Goofy in Soccermania (1987), Matthew O'Callaghan
- The Prince and the Pauper (1990), George Scribner
- Off His Rockers (1992), Barry Cook
- Runaway Brain (1995), Chris Bailey
- Tangled Ever After (2012), Nathan Greno and Byron Howard
- Get a Horse! (2013), Lauren MacMullan
- Frozen Fever (2015), Chris Buck and Jennifer Lee

=== Warner Bros. ===
- Bosko, the Talk-Ink Kid (1929), Hugh Harman and Rudolf Ising
- Sinkin' in the Bathtub (1930), Hugh Harman and Rudolf Ising
- Congo Jazz (1930), Hugh Harman and Rudolf Ising
- Hold Anything (1930), Hugh Harman and Rudolf Ising
- The Booze Hangs High (1930), Hugh Harman and Rudolf Ising
- Box Car Blues (1930), Hugh Harman and Rudolf Ising
- Big Man from the North (1931), Hugh Harman and Rudolf Ising
- Ain't Nature Grand! (1931), Hugh Harman and Rudolf Ising
- Ups 'n Downs (1931), Hugh Harman and Rudolf Ising
- Dumb Patrol (1931), Hugh Harman and Rudolf Ising
- Yodeling Yokels (1931), Hugh Harman and Rudolf Ising
- Bosko's Holiday (1931), Hugh Harman and Rudolf Ising
- The Tree's Knees (1931), Hugh Harman and Rudolf Ising
- Lady, Play Your Mandolin! (1931), Rudolf Ising
- Smile, Darn Ya, Smile! (1931), Rudolf Ising
- Bosko Shipwrecked! (1931), Hugh Harman
- One More Time (1931), Rudolf Ising
- Bosko the Doughboy (1931), Hugh Harman
- You Don't Know What You're Doin'! (1931), Rudolf Ising
- Bosko's Soda Fountain (1931), Hugh Harman
- Hittin' the Trail for Hallelujah Land (1931), Rudolf Ising - Part of Censored Eleven
- Bosko's Fox Hunt (1931), Hugh Harman
- Red-Headed Baby (1931), Rudolf Ising
- Bosko at the Zoo (1932), Hugh Harman
- Pagan Moon (1932), Rudolf Ising
- Battling Bosko (1932), Hugh Harman
- Freddy the Freshman (1932), Rudolf Ising
- Big-Hearted Bosko (1932), Hugh Harman
- Crosby, Columbo, and Vallee (1932), Rudolf Ising
- Bosko's Party (1932), Hugh Harman
- Goopy Geer (1932), Rudolf Ising
- Bosko and Bruno (1932), Hugh Harman
- It's Got Me Again! (1932), Rudolf Ising
- Moonlight for Two (1932), Rudolf Ising
- Bosko's Dog Race (1932), Hugh Harman
- The Queen Was in the Parlor (1932), Rudolf Ising
- Bosko at the Beach (1932), Hugh Harman
- I Love a Parade (1932), Rudolf Ising
- Bosko's Store (1932), Hugh Harman
- Bosko the Lumberjack (1932), Hugh Harman
- You're Too Careless with Your Kisses! (1932), Rudolf Ising
- Ride Him, Bosko! (1932), Hugh Harman
- I Wish I Had Wings (1932), Rudolf Ising
- Bosko the Drawback (1932), Hugh Harman
- A Great Big Bunch of You (1932), Rudolf Ising
- Bosko's Dizzy Date (1932), Hugh Harman
- Three's a Crowd (1932), Rudolf Ising
- Bosko's Woodland Daze (1932), Hugh Harman
- The Shanty Where Santy Claus Lives (1933), Rudolf Ising
- Bosko in Dutch (1933), Hugh Harman, Friz Freleng
- One Step Ahead of My Shadow (1933), Rudolf Ising
- Bosko in Person (1933), Hugh Harman, Friz Freleng
- Young and Healthy (1933), Rudolf Ising
- Bosko the Speed King (1933), Hugh Harman
- The Organ Grinder (1933), Rudolf Ising
- Wake Up the Gypsy in Me (1933), Rudolf Ising
- Bosko's Knight-Mare (1933), Hugh Harman
- I Like Mountain Music (1933), Rudolf Ising
- Bosko the Sheep-Herder (1933), Hugh Harman
- Beau Bosko (1933), Hugh Harman, Friz Freleng
- Shuffle Off to Buffalo (1933), Rudolf Ising, Friz Freleng
- Bosko's Mechanical Man (1933), Hugh Harman
- The Dish Ran Away with the Spoon (1933), Rudolf Ising
- Bosko the Musketeer (1933), Hugh Harman
- Bosko's Picture Show (1933), Hugh Harman, Friz Freleng
- We're in the Money (1933), Rudolf Ising
- Buddy's Day Out (1933), Tom Palmer
- I've Got to Sing a Torch Song (1933), Tom Palmer
- Buddy's Beer Garden (1933), Earl Duvall
- Buddy's Show Boat (1933), Earl Duvall
- Sittin' on a Backyard Fence (1933), Earl Duvall
- Buddy the Gob (1934), Friz Freleng
- Pettin' in the Park (1934), Bernard Brown
- Honeymoon Hotel (1934), Earl Duvall
- Buddy and Towser (1934), Friz Freleng
- Buddy's Garage (1934), Earl Duvall
- Beauty and the Beast (1934), Friz Freleng
- Those Were Wonderful Days (1934), Bernard Brown
- Buddy's Trolley Troubles (1934), Friz Freleng
- Goin' to Heaven on a Mule (1934), Friz Freleng
- Buddy of the Apes (1934), Ben Hardaway
- How Do I Know It's Sunday (1934), Friz Freleng
- Buddy's Bearcats (1934), Jack King
- Why Do I Dream Those Dreams (1934), Friz Freleng
- The Girl at the Ironing Board (1934), Friz Freleng
- The Miller's Daughter (1934), Friz Freleng
- Shake Your Powder Puff (1934), Friz Freleng
- Buddy the Detective (1934), Jack King
- Rhythm in the Bow (1934), Ben Hardaway
- Buddy the Woodsman (1934), Jack King
- Buddy's Circus (1934), Jack King
- Those Beautiful Dames (1934), Friz Freleng
- Buddy's Adventures (1934), Ben Hardaway
- Pop Goes Your Heart (1934), Friz Freleng
- Viva Buddy (1934), Jack King
- Buddy the Dentist (1934), Ben Hardaway
- Mr. and Mrs. Is the Name (1935), Friz Freleng
- Country Boy (1935), Friz Freleng
- I Haven't Got a Hat (1935), Friz Freleng
- Buddy's Pony Express (1935), Ben Hardaway
- Buddy's Theatre (1935), Ben Hardaway
- Buddy of the Legion (1935), Ben Hardaway
- Along Flirtation Walk (1935), Friz Freleng
- My Green Fedora (1935), Friz Freleng
- Buddy's Lost World (1935), Jack King
- Into Your Dance (1935), Friz Freleng
- Buddy's Bug Hunt (1935), Jack King
- Buddy in Africa (1935), Ben Hardaway
- Country Mouse (1935), Friz Freleng
- Buddy Steps Out (1935), Jack King
- The Merry Old Soul (1935), Friz Freleng
- Buddy the Gee Man (1935), Jack King
- The Lady in Red (1935), Friz Freleng
- A Cartoonist's Nightmare (1935), Jack King
- Little Dutch Plate (1935), Friz Freleng
- Hollywood Capers (1935), Jack King
- Gold Diggers of '49 (1935), Tex Avery
- Billboard Frolics (1935), Friz Freleng
- Flowers for Madame (1935), Friz Freleng
- I Wanna Play House (1936), Friz Freleng
- The Phantom Ship (1936), Jack King
- The Cat Came Back (1936), Friz Freleng
- Boom Boom (1936), Jack King
- Page Miss Glory (1936), Tex Avery
- Alpine Antics (1936), Jack King
- The Fire Alarm (1936), Jack King
- The Blow Out (1936), Tex Avery
- I'm a Big Shot Now (1936), Friz Freleng
- Westward Whoa (1935), Jack King
- Plane Dippy (1936), Tex Avery
- Let It Be Me (1936), Friz Freleng
- I'd Love to Take Orders from You (1936), Tex Avery
- Fish Tales (1936), Jack King
- Bingo Crosbyana (1936), Friz Freleng
- Shanghaied Shipmates (1936), Jack King
- When I Yoo Hoo (1936), Friz Freleng
- Porky's Pet (1936), Jack King
- I Love to Singa (1936), Tex Avery
- Porky the Rain-Maker (1936), Tex Avery
- Sunday Go to Meetin' Time (1936), Friz Freleng - Part of Censored Eleven
- Porky's Poultry Plant (1936), Frank Tashlin
- At Your Service Madame (1936), Friz Freleng
- Porky's Moving Day (1936), Jack King
- Toy Town Hall (1936), Friz Freleng
- Milk and Money (1936), Tex Avery
- Boulevardier from the Bronx (1936), Friz Freleng
- Don't Look Now (1936), Tex Avery
- Little Beau Porky (1936), Frank Tashlin
- The Coo-Coo Nut Grove (1936), Friz Freleng
- The Village Smithy (1936), Tex Avery
- Porky in the North Woods (1936), Frank Tashlin
- He Was Her Man (1937), Friz Freleng
- Porky the Wrestler (1937), Tex Avery
- Pigs Is Pigs (1937), Friz Freleng
- Porky's Road Race (1937), Frank Tashlin
- Picador Porky (1937), Tex Avery
- I Only Have Eyes for You (1937), Tex Avery
- The Fella with a Fiddle (1937), Friz Freleng
- Porky's Romance (1937), Frank Tashlin
- She Was an Acrobat's Daughter (1937), Friz Freleng
- Porky's Duck Hunt (1937), Tex Avery
- Ain't We Got Fun (1937), Tex Avery
- Porky and Gabby (1937), Ub Iwerks
- Clean Pastures (1937), Friz Freleng - Part of Censored Eleven
- Uncle Tom's Bungalow (1937), Tex Avery - Part of Censored Eleven
- Porky's Building (1937), Frank Tashlin
- Streamlined Greta Green (1937), Friz Freleng
- Sweet Sioux (1937), Friz Freleng
- Porky's Super Service (1937), Ub Iwerks
- Egghead Rides Again (1937), Tex Avery
- Porky's Badtime Story (1937), Bob Clampett
- Plenty of Money and You (1937), Friz Freleng
- Porky's Railroad (1937), Frank Tashlin
- A Sunbonnet Blue (1937), Tex Avery
- Get Rich Quick Porky (1937), Bob Clampett
- Speaking of the Weather (1937), Frank Tashlin
- Porky's Garden (1937), Tex Avery
- Dog Daze (1937), Tex Avery
- I Wanna Be a Sailor (1937), Friz Freleng
- Rover's Rival (1937), Bob Clampett
- The Lyin' Mouse (1937), Friz Freleng
- The Case of the Stuttering Pig (1937), Frank Tashlin
- Little Red Walking Hood (1937), Tex Avery
- Porky's Double Trouble (1937), Frank Tashlin
- The Woods Are Full of Cuckoos (1937), Frank Tashlin
- Porky's Hero Agency (1937), Bob Clampett
- September in the Rain (1937), Friz Freleng
- Daffy Duck & Egghead (1938), Tex Avery
- Porky's Poppa (1938), Bob Clampett
- My Little Buckaroo (1938), Friz Freleng
- Porky at the Crocadero (1938), Frank Tashlin
- Jungle Jitters (1938), Friz Freleng - Part of Censored Eleven
- What Price Porky (1938), Bob Clampett
- The Sneezing Weasel (1938), Tex Avery
- Porky's Phoney Express (1938), Cal Dalton, Cal Howard
- A Star is Hatched (1938), Friz Freleng
- Porky's Five & Ten (1938), Bob Clampett
- The Penguin Parade (1938), Tex Avery
- Porky's Hare Hunt (1938), Ben Hardaway, Cal Dalton
- Now That Summer is Gone (1938), Frank Tashlin
- Injun Trouble (1938), Bob Clampett
- The Isle of Pingo Pongo (1938), Tex Avery - Part of Censored Eleven
- Porky the Fireman (1938), Frank Tashlin
- Katnip Kollege (1938), Cal Dalton, Cal Howard
- Porky's Party (1938), Bob Clampett
- Have You Got Any Castles? (1938), Frank Tashlin
- Love and Curses (1938), Ben Hardaway, Cal Dalton
- Cinderella Meets Fella (1938), Tex Avery
- Porky's Spring Planting (1938), Frank Tashlin
- Porky & Daffy (1938), Bob Clampett
- The Major Lied 'Til Dawn (1938), Frank Tashlin
- Wholly Smoke (1938), Frank Tashlin
- A-Lad-In Bagdad (1938), Cal Dalton, Cal Howard
- Cracked Ice (1938), Frank Tashlin
- A Feud There Was (1938), Tex Avery
- Porky in Wackyland (1938), Bob Clampett
- Little Pancho Vanilla (1938), Frank Tashlin
- Porky's Naughty Nephew (1938), Bob Clampett
- Johnny Smith and Poker-Huntas (1938), Tex Avery
- Porky in Egypt (1938), Bob Clampett
- You're an Education (1938), Frank Tashlin
- The Night Watchman (1938), Chuck Jones
- The Daffy Doc (1938), Bob Clampett
- Daffy Duck in Hollywood (1938), Tex Avery
- Porky the Gob (1938), Ben Hardaway, Cal Dalton
- Count Me Out (1938), Ben Hardaway, Cal Dalton
- The Mice Will Play (1938), Tex Avery
- The Lone Stranger and Porky (1939), Bob Clampett
- Dog Gone Modern (1939), Chuck Jones
- It's an Ill Wind (1939), Ben Hardaway, Cal Dalton
- Hamateur Night (1939), Tex Avery
- Robin Hood Makes Good (1939), Chuck Jones
- Porky's Tire Trouble (1939), Bob Clampett
- Gold Rush Daze (1939), Ben Hardaway, Cal Dalton
- A Day at the Zoo (1939), Tex Avery
- Porky's Movie Mystery (1939), Bob Clampett
- Prest-O Change-O (1939), Chuck Jones
- Chicken Jitters (1939), Bob Clampett
- Bars and Stripes Forever (1939), Ben Hardaway, Cal Dalton
- Daffy Duck and the Dinosaur (1939), Chuck Jones
- Porky and Teabiscuit (1939), Ben Hardaway, Cal Dalton
- Thugs with Dirty Mugs (1939), Tex Avery
- Kristopher Kolumbus Jr. (1939), Bob Clampett
- Naughty but Mice (1939), Chuck Jones
- Believe It or Else (1939), Tex Avery
- Polar Pals (1939), Bob Clampett
- Hobo Gadget Band (1939), Ben Hardaway, Cal Dalton
- Scalp Trouble (1939), Bob Clampett
- Old Glory (1939), Chuck Jones
- Porky's Picnic (1939), Bob Clampett
- Dangerous Dan McFoo (1939), Tex Avery
- Snowman's Land (1939), Chuck Jones
- Wise Quacks (1939), Bob Clampett
- Hare-um Scare-um (1939), Ben Hardaway, Cal Dalton
- Detouring America (1939), Tex Avery
- Little Brother Rat (1939), Chuck Jones
- Porky's Hotel (1939), Bob Clampett
- Sioux Me (1939), Ben Hardaway, Cal Dalton
- Land of the Midnight Fun (1939), Tex Avery
- Jeepers Creepers (1939), Bob Clampett
- Naughty Neighbors (1939), Bob Clampett
- The Little Lion Hunter (1939), Chuck Jones
- The Good Egg (1939), Chuck Jones
- Pied Piper Porky (1939), Bob Clampett
- Fresh Fish (1939), Tex Avery
- Fagin's Freshman (1939), Ben Hardaway, Cal Dalton
- Porky the Giant Killer (1939), Ben Hardaway, Cal Dalton
- Sniffles and the Bookworm (1939), Chuck Jones
- Screwball Football (1939), Tex Avery
- The Film Fan (1939), Bob Clampett
- The Curious Puppy (1939), Chuck Jones
- Porky's Last Stand (1940), Bob Clampett
- The Early Worm Gets the Bird (1940), Tex Avery
- Africa Squeaks (1940), Bob Clampett
- Mighty Hunters (1940), Chuck Jones
- Busy Bakers (1940), Ben Hardaway, Cal Dalton
- Ali-Baba Bound (1940), Bob Clampett
- Elmer's Candid Camera (1940), Chuck Jones
- Pilgrim Porky (1940), Bob Clampett
- Cross Country Detours (1940), Tex Avery
- Confederate Honey (1940), Friz Freleng
- The Bear's Tale (1940), Tex Avery
- Slap-Happy Pappy (1940), Bob Clampett
- Porky's Poor Fish (1940), Bob Clampett
- The Hardship of Miles Standish (1940), Friz Freleng
- Sniffles Takes a Trip (1940), Chuck Jones
- You Ought to Be in Pictures (1940), Friz Freleng
- A Gander at Mother Goose (1940), Tex Avery
- Tom Thumb in Trouble (1940), Chuck Jones
- The Chewin' Bruin (1940), Bob Clampett
- Circus Today (1940), Tex Avery
- Little Blabbermouse (1940), Friz Freleng
- Porky's Baseball Broadcast (1940), Friz Freleng
- The Egg Collector (1940), Chuck Jones
- A Wild Hare (1940), Tex Avery
- Ghost Wanted (1940), Chuck Jones
- Patient Porky (1940), Bob Clampett
- Ceiling Hero (1940), Tex Avery
- Malibu Beach Party (1940), Friz Freleng
- Calling Dr. Porky (1940), Friz Freleng
- Stage Fright (1940), Chuck Jones
- Prehistoric Porky (1940), Bob Clampett
- Holiday Highlights (1940), Tex Avery
- Good Night, Elmer (1940), Chuck Jones
- The Sour Puss (1940), Bob Clampett
- Wacky Wildlife (1940), Tex Avery
- Bedtime for Sniffles (1940), Chuck Jones
- Porky's Hired Hand (1940), Friz Freleng
- Of Fox and Hounds (1940), Tex Avery
- The Timid Toreador (1940), Bob Clampett, Norman McCabe
- Shop Look & Listen (1940), Friz Freleng
- Elmer's Pet Rabbit (1941), Chuck Jones
- Porky's Snooze Reel (1941), Bob Clampett, Norman McCabe
- The Fighting 69½th (1941), Friz Freleng
- Sniffles Bells the Cat (1941), Chuck Jones
- The Haunted Mouse (1941), Tex Avery
- The Crackpot Quail (1941), Tex Avery
- The Cat's Tale (1941), Friz Freleng
- Joe Glow, the Firefly (1941), Chuck Jones
- Tortoise Beats Hare (1941), Tex Avery
- Porky's Bear Facts (1941), Friz Freleng
- Goofy Groceries (1941), Bob Clampett
- Toy Trouble (1941), Chuck Jones
- Porky's Preview (1941), Tex Avery
- The Trial of Mr. Wolf (1941), Friz Freleng
- Porky's Ant (1941), Chuck Jones
- Farm Frolics (1941), Bob Clampett
- Hollywood Steps Out (1941), Tex Avery
- A Coy Decoy (1941), Bob Clampett
- Hiawatha's Rabbit Hunt (1941), Friz Freleng
- Porky's Prize Pony (1941), Chuck Jones
- The Wacky Worm (1941), Friz Freleng
- Meet John Doughboy (1941), Bob Clampett
- The Heckling Hare (1941), Tex Avery
- Inki and the Lion (1941), Chuck Jones
- Aviation Vacation (1941), Tex Avery
- We, the Animals Squeak! (1941), Bob Clampett
- Sport Chumpions (1941), Friz Freleng
- The Henpecked Duck (1941), Bob Clampett
- Snowtime for Comedy (1941), Chuck Jones
- All This and Rabbit Stew (1941), Tex Avery - Part of Censored Eleven
- Notes to You (1941), Friz Freleng
- The Brave Little Bat (1941), Chuck Jones
- The Bug Parade (1941), Tex Avery
- Robinson Crusoe, Jr. (1941), Norman McCabe
- Rookie Revue (1941), Friz Freleng
- Saddle Silly (1941), Chuck Jones
- Porky's Midnight Matinee (1941), Chuck Jones
- The Cagey Canary (1941), Bob Clampett
- Rhapsody in Rivets (1941), Friz Freleng
- Wabbit Twouble (1941), Bob Clampett
- Porky's Pooch (1941), Bob Clampett
- Hop Skip and a Chump (1942), Friz Freleng
- Porky's Pastry Pirates (1942), Friz Freleng
- The Bird Came C.O.D. (1942), Chuck Jones
- Aloha Hooey (1942), Tex Avery
- Who's Who in the Zoo (1942), Norman McCabe
- Porky's Cafe (1942), Chuck Jones
- Conrad the Sailor (1942), Chuck Jones
- Crazy Cruise (1942), Tex Avery
- The Wabbit Who Came to Supper (1942), Bob Clampett
- Saps in Chaps (1942), Friz Freleng
- Horton Hatches the Egg (1942), Bob Clampett
- Dog Tired (1942), Chuck Jones
- Daffy's Southern Exposure (1942), Norman McCabe
- The Wacky Wabbit (1942), Bob Clampett
- The Draft Horse (1942), Chuck Jones
- Lights Fantastic (1942), Friz Freleng
- Nutty News (1942), Bob Clampett
- Hold the Lion, Please (1942), Chuck Jones
- Hobby Horse-Laffs (1942), Norman McCabe
- Gopher Goofy (1942), Norman McCabe
- Double Chaser (1942), Friz Freleng
- Bugs Bunny Gets the Boid (1942), Bob Clampett
- Wacky Blackout (1942), Bob Clampett
- Foney Fables (1942), Friz Freleng
- The Ducktators (1942), Norman McCabe
- The Squawkin' Hawk (1942), Chuck Jones
- Fresh Hare (1942), Friz Freleng
- Eatin' on the Cuff (1942), Bob Clampett
- Fox Pop (1942), Chuck Jones
- The Impatient Patient (1942), Norman McCabe
- The Dover Boys (1942), Chuck Jones
- The Hep Cat (1942), Bob Clampett
- The Sheepish Wolf (1942), Friz Freleng
- The Daffy Duckaroo (1942), Norman McCabe
- The Hare-Brained Hypnotist (1942), Friz Freleng
- A Tale of Two Kitties (1942), Bob Clampett
- Ding Dog Daddy (1942), Friz Freleng
- My Favorite Duck (1942), Chuck Jones
- Case of the Missing Hare (1942), Chuck Jones
- Coal Black and de Sebben Dwarfs (1943), Bob Clampett - Part of Censored Eleven
- Confusions of a Nutzy Spy (1943), Norman McCabe
- Pigs in a Polka (1943), Friz Freleng
- Tortoise Wins by a Hare (1943), Bob Clampett
- To Duck or Not to Duck (1943), Chuck Jones
- The Fifth-Column Mouse (1943), Friz Freleng
- Flop Goes the Weasel (1943), Chuck Jones
- Hop and Go (1943), Norman McCabe
- Super-Rabbit (1943), Chuck Jones
- The Unbearable Bear (1943), Chuck Jones
- The Wise Quacking Duck (1943), Bob Clampett
- Greetings Bait (1943), Friz Freleng
- Tokio Jokio (1943), Norman McCabe
- Yankee Doodle Daffy (1943), Friz Freleng
- Jack-Wabbit and the Beanstalk (1943), Friz Freleng
- The Aristo-Cat (1943), Chuck Jones
- Wackiki Wabbit (1943), Chuck Jones
- Porky Pig's Feat (1943), Frank Tashlin
- Tin Pan Alley Cats (1943), Bob Clampett - Part of Censored Eleven
- Scrap Happy Daffy (1943), Frank Tashlin
- Hiss and Make Up (1943), Friz Freleng
- A Corny Concerto (1943), Bob Clampett
- Fin'n Catty (1943), Chuck Jones
- Falling Hare (1943), Bob Clampett
- Inki and the Minah Bird (1943), Chuck Jones
- Daffy - The Commando (1943), Friz Freleng
- An Itch in Time (1943), Bob Clampett
- Puss n' Booty (1943), Frank Tashlin
- Little Red Riding Rabbit (1944), Friz Freleng
- What's Cookin' Doc? (1944), Bob Clampett
- Meatless Flyday (1944), Friz Freleng
- Tom Turk and Daffy (1944), Chuck Jones
- Bugs Bunny and the Three Bears (1944), Chuck Jones
- I Got Plenty of Mutton (1944), Frank Tashlin
- The Weakly Reporter (1944), Chuck Jones
- Tick Tock Tuckered (1944), Bob Clampett
- Bugs Bunny Nips the Nips (1944), Friz Freleng
- Swooner Crooner (1944), Frank Tashlin
- Russian Rhapsody (1944), Bob Clampett
- Duck Soup to Nuts (1944), Friz Freleng
- Angel Puss (1944), Chuck Jones - Part of Censored Eleven
- Slightly Daffy (1944), Friz Freleng
- Hare Ribbin' (1944), Bob Clampett
- Brother Brat (1944), Frank Tashlin
- Hare Force (1944), Friz Freleng
- From Hand to Mouse (1944), Chuck Jones
- Birdy and the Beast (1944), Bob Clampett
- Buckaroo Bugs (1944), Bob Clampett
- Goldilocks and the Jivin' Bears (1944), Friz Freleng - Part of Censored Eleven
- Plane Daffy (1944), Frank Tashlin
- Lost and Foundling (1944), Chuck Jones
- Booby Hatched (1944), Frank Tashlin
- The Old Grey Hare (1944), Bob Clampett
- The Stupid Cupid (1944), Frank Tashlin
- Stage Door Cartoon (1944), Friz Freleng
- Odor-able Kitty (1945), Chuck Jones
- Herr Meets Hare (1945), Friz Freleng
- Draftee Daffy (1945), Bob Clampett
- The Unruly Hare (1945), Frank Tashlin
- Trap Happy Porky (1945), Chuck Jones
- Life with Feathers (1945), Friz Freleng
- Behind the Meat-Ball (1945), Frank Tashlin
- Hare Trigger (1945), Friz Freleng
- Ain't That Ducky (1945), Friz Freleng
- A Gruesome Twosome (1945), Bob Clampett
- Tale of Two Mice (1945), Frank Tashlin
- Wagon Heels (1945), Bob Clampett
- Hare Conditioned (1945), Chuck Jones
- Fresh Airedale (1945), Chuck Jones
- The Bashful Buzzard (1945), Bob Clampett
- Peck Up Your Troubles (1945), Friz Freleng
- Hare Tonic (1945), Chuck Jones
- Nasty Quacks (1945), Frank Tashlin
- Book Revue (1946), Bob Clampett
- Baseball Bugs (1946), Friz Freleng
- Holiday for Shoestrings (1946), Friz Freleng
- Quentin Quail (1946), Chuck Jones
- Baby Bottleneck (1946), Bob Clampett
- Hare Remover (1946), Frank Tashlin
- Daffy Doodles (1946), Robert McKimson
- Hollywood Canine Canteen (1946), Robert McKimson
- Hush, My Mouse (1946), Chuck Jones
- Hair-Raising Hare (1946), Chuck Jones
- Kitty Kornered (1946), Bob Clampett
- Hollywood Daffy (1946), Friz Freleng
- Acrobatty Bunny (1946), Robert McKimson
- The Eager Beaver (1946), Chuck Jones
- The Great Piggy Bank Robbery (1946), Bob Clampett
- Bacall to Arms (1946), Arthur Davis
- Of Thee I Sting (1946), Friz Freleng
- Walky Talky Hawky (1946), Robert McKimson
- Racketeer Rabbit (1946), Friz Freleng
- Fair and Worm-er (1946), Chuck Jones
- The Big Snooze (1946), Bob Clampett
- The Mouse-Merized Cat (1946), Robert McKimson
- Mouse Menace (1946), Arthur Davis
- Rhapsody Rabbit (1946), Friz Freleng
- Roughly Squeaking (1946), Chuck Jones
- One Meat Brawl (1947), Robert McKimson
- The Goofy Gophers (1947), Arthur Davis
- The Gay Anties (1947), Friz Freleng
- Scent-imental Over You (1947), Chuck Jones
- A Hare Grows in Manhattan (1947), Friz Freleng
- Birth of a Notion (1947), Robert McKimson
- Tweetie Pie (1947), Friz Freleng
- Rabbit Transit (1947), Friz Freleng
- Hobo Bobo (1947), Robert McKimson
- Along Came Daffy (1947), Friz Freleng
- Inki at the Circus (1947), Chuck Jones
- Easter Yeggs (1947), Robert McKimson
- Crowing Pains (1947), Robert McKimson
- A Pest in the House (1947), Chuck Jones
- The Foxy Duckling (1947), Arthur Davis
- House Hunting Mice (1947), Chuck Jones
- Little Orphan Airedale (1947), Chuck Jones
- Doggone Cats (1947), Arthur Davis
- Slick Hare (1947), Friz Freleng
- Mexican Joyride (1947), Arthur Davis
- Catch as Cats Can (1947), Arthur Davis
- A Horse Fly Fleas (1947), Robert McKimson
- Gorilla My Dreams (1948), Robert McKimson
- Two Gophers from Texas (1948), Arthur Davis
- A Feather in His Hare (1948), Chuck Jones
- What Makes Daffy Duck? (1948), Arthur Davis
- What's Brewin', Bruin? (1948), Chuck Jones
- Daffy Duck Slept Here (1948), Robert McKimson
- A Hick a Slick and a Chick (1948), Arthur Davis
- Back Alley Oproar (1948), Friz Freleng
- I Taw a Putty Tat (1948), Friz Freleng
- Rabbit Punch (1948), Chuck Jones
- Hop, Look and Listen (1948), Robert McKimson
- Nothing But the Tooth (1948), Arthur Davis
- Buccaneer Bunny (1948), Friz Freleng
- Bone Sweet Bone (1948), Arthur Davis
- Bugs Bunny Rides Again (1948), Friz Freleng
- The Rattled Rooster (1948), Arthur Davis
- The Up-Standing Sitter (1948), Robert McKimson
- The Shell Shocked Egg (1948), Robert McKimson
- Haredevil Hare (1948), Chuck Jones
- You Were Never Duckier (1948), Chuck Jones
- Dough Ray Me-ow (1948), Arthur Davis
- Hot Cross Bunny (1948), Robert McKimson
- The Pest That Came to Dinner (1948), Arthur Davis
- Hare Splitter (1948), Friz Freleng
- Odor of the Day (1948), Arthur Davis
- The Foghorn Leghorn (1948), Robert McKimson
- A-Lad-In His Lamp (1948), Robert McKimson
- Daffy Dilly (1948), Chuck Jones
- Kit for Cat (1948), Friz Freleng
- The Stupor Salesman (1948), Arthur Davis
- Riff Raffy Daffy (1948), Arthur Davis
- My Bunny Lies over the Sea (1948), Chuck Jones
- Scaredy Cat (1948), Chuck Jones
- Wise Quackers (1949), Friz Freleng
- Hare Do (1949), Friz Freleng
- Holiday for Drumsticks (1949), Arthur Davis
- Awful Orphan (1949), Chuck Jones
- Porky Chops (1949), Arthur Davis
- Mississippi Hare (1949), Chuck Jones
- Paying the Piper (1949), Robert McKimson
- Daffy Duck Hunt (1949), Robert McKimson
- Rebel Rabbit (1949), Robert McKimson
- Mouse Wreckers (1949), Chuck Jones
- High Diving Hare (1949), Friz Freleng
- The Bee-Deviled Bruin (1949), Chuck Jones
- Curtain Razor (1949), Friz Freleng
- Bowery Bugs (1949), Arthur Davis
- Mouse Mazurka (1949), Friz Freleng
- Long-Haired Hare (1949), Chuck Jones
- Henhouse Henery (1949), Robert McKimson
- Knights Must Fall (1949), Friz Freleng
- Bad Ol' Putty Tat (1949), Friz Freleng
- The Grey Hounded Hare (1949), Robert McKimson
- Often an Orphan (1949), Chuck Jones
- The Windblown Hare (1949), Robert McKimson
- Dough for the Do-Do (1949), Friz Freleng
- Fast and Furry-ous (1949), Chuck Jones
- Each Dawn I Crow (1949), Friz Freleng
- Frigid Hare (1949), Chuck Jones
- Swallow the Leader (1949), Robert McKimson
- Bye, Bye Bluebeard (1949), Arthur Davis
- For Scent-imental Reasons (1949), Chuck Jones
- Hippety Hopper (1949), Robert McKimson
- Which Is Witch (1949), Friz Freleng
- Bear Feat (1949), Chuck Jones
- Rabbit Hood (1949), Chuck Jones
- A Ham in a Role (1949), Robert McKimson
- Home Tweet Home (1950), Friz Freleng
- Hurdy-Gurdy Hare (1950), Robert McKimson
- Boobs in the Woods (1950), Robert McKimson
- Mutiny on the Bunny (1950), Friz Freleng
- The Lion's Busy (1950), Friz Freleng
- The Scarlet Pumpernickel (1950), Chuck Jones
- Homeless Hare (1950), Chuck Jones
- Strife with Father (1950), Robert McKimson
- The Hypo-Chondri-Cat (1950), Chuck Jones
- Big House Bunny (1950), Friz Freleng
- The Leghorn Blows at Midnight (1950), Robert McKimson
- His Bitter Half (1950), Friz Freleng
- An Egg Scramble (1950), Robert McKimson
- What's Up, Doc? (1950), Robert McKimson
- All a Bir-r-r-rd (1950), Friz Freleng
- 8 Ball Bunny (1950), Chuck Jones
- It's Hummer Time (1950), Robert McKimson
- Golden Yeggs (1950), Friz Freleng
- Hillbilly Hare (1950), Robert McKimson
- Dog Gone South (1950), Chuck Jones
- The Ducksters (1950), Chuck Jones
- A Fractured Leghorn (1950), Robert McKimson
- Bunker Hill Bunny (1950), Friz Freleng
- Canary Row (1950), Friz Freleng
- Stooge for a Mouse (1950), Friz Freleng
- Pop 'im Pop! (1950), Robert McKimson
- Bushy Hare (1950), Robert McKimson
- Caveman Inki (1950), Chuck Jones
- Dog Collared (1950), Robert McKimson
- Rabbit of Seville (1950), Chuck Jones
- Two's a Crowd (1950), Chuck Jones
- Hare We Go (1951), Robert McKimson
- A Fox in a Fix (1951), Robert McKimson
- Canned Feud (1951), Friz Freleng
- Rabbit Every Monday (1951), Friz Freleng
- Putty Tat Trouble (1951), Friz Freleng
- Corn Plastered (1951), Robert McKimson
- Bunny Hugged (1951), Chuck Jones
- Scentimental Romeo (1951), Chuck Jones
- A Bone for a Bone (1951), Friz Freleng
- The Fair-Haired Hare (1951), Friz Freleng
- A Hound for Trouble (1951), Chuck Jones
- Early to Bet (1951), Robert McKimson
- Rabbit Fire (1951), Chuck Jones
- Room and Bird (1951), Friz Freleng
- Chow Hound (1951), Chuck Jones
- French Rarebit (1951), Robert McKimson
- The Wearing of the Grin (1951), Chuck Jones
- Leghorn Swoggled (1951), Robert McKimson
- His Hare-Raising Tale (1951), Friz Freleng
- Cheese Chasers (1951), Chuck Jones
- Lovelorn Leghorn (1951), Robert McKimson
- Tweety's S.O.S. (1951), Friz Freleng
- Ballot Box Bunny (1951), Friz Freleng
- A Bear for Punishment (1951), Chuck Jones
- Sleepy Time Possum (1951), Robert McKimson
- Drip-Along Daffy (1951), Chuck Jones
- Big Top Bunny (1951), Robert McKimson
- Tweet Tweet Tweety (1951), Friz Freleng
- The Prize Pest (1951), Robert McKimson
- Who's Kitten Who (1952), Robert McKimson
- Operation: Rabbit (1952), Chuck Jones
- Feed the Kitty (1952), Chuck Jones
- Gift Wrapped (1952), Friz Freleng
- Foxy by Proxy (1952), Friz Freleng
- Thumb Fun (1952), Robert McKimson
- 14 Carrot Rabbit (1952), Friz Freleng
- Little Beau Pepé (1952), Chuck Jones
- Kiddin' The Kitten (1952), Robert McKimson
- Water, Water Every Hare (1952), Chuck Jones
- Little Red Rodent Hood (1952), Friz Freleng
- Sock a Doodle Do (1952), Robert McKimson
- Beep, Beep (1952), Chuck Jones
- The Hasty Hare (1952), Chuck Jones
- Ain't She Tweet (1952), Friz Freleng
- The Turn-Tale Wolf (1952), Robert McKimson
- Cracked Quack (1952), Friz Freleng
- Oily Hare (1952), Robert McKimson
- Hoppy Go Lucky (1952), Robert McKimson
- Going! Going! Gosh! (1952), Chuck Jones
- A Bird in a Guilty Cage (1952), Friz Freleng
- Mouse-Warming (1952), Chuck Jones
- Rabbit Seasoning (1952), Chuck Jones
- The EGGcited Rooster (1952), Robert McKimson
- Tree for Two (1952), Friz Freleng
- The Super Snooper (1952), Robert McKimson
- Rabbit's Kin (1952), Robert McKimson
- Terrier Stricken (1952), Chuck Jones
- Fool Coverage (1952), Robert McKimson
- Hare Lift (1952), Friz Freleng
- Don't Give Up the Sheep (1953), Chuck Jones
- Snow Business (1953), Friz Freleng
- A Mouse Divided (1953), Friz Freleng
- Forward March Hare (1953), Chuck Jones
- Kiss Me Cat (1953), Chuck Jones
- Duck Amuck (1953), Chuck Jones
- Upswept Hare (1953), Robert McKimson
- A Peck o' Trouble (1953), Robert McKimson
- Fowl Weather (1953), Friz Freleng
- Muscle Tussle (1953), Robert McKimson
- Southern Fried Rabbit (1953), Friz Freleng
- Ant Pasted (1953), Friz Freleng
- Much Ado About Nutting (1953), Chuck Jones
- There Auto Be a Law (1953), Robert McKimson
- Hare Trimmed (1953), Friz Freleng
- Tom Tom Tomcat (1953), Friz Freleng
- Wild Over You (1953), Chuck Jones
- Duck Dodgers in the 24½th Century (1953), Chuck Jones
- Bully for Bugs (1953), Chuck Jones
- Plop Goes the Weasel (1953), Robert McKimson
- Cat-Tails for Two (1953), Robert McKimson
- A Street Cat Named Sylvester (1953), Friz Freleng
- Zipping Along (1953), Chuck Jones
- Lumber Jack-Rabbit (1953), Chuck Jones
- Duck! Rabbit, Duck! (1953), Chuck Jones
- Easy Peckins (1953), Robert McKimson
- Catty Cornered (1953), Friz Freleng
- Of Rice and Hen (1953), Robert McKimson
- Cats Aweigh! (1953), Robert McKimson
- Robot Rabbit (1953), Friz Freleng
- Punch Trunk (1953), Chuck Jones
- Dog Pounded (1954), Friz Freleng
- Captain Hareblower (1954), Friz Freleng
- I Gopher You (1954), Friz Freleng
- Feline Frame-Up (1954), Chuck Jones
- Wild Wife (1954), Robert McKimson
- No Barking (1954), Chuck Jones
- Bugs and Thugs (1954), Friz Freleng
- The Cat's Bah (1954), Chuck Jones
- Design for Leaving (1954), Robert McKimson
- Bell Hoppy (1954), Robert McKimson
- No Parking Hare (1954), Robert McKimson
- Dr. Jerkyl's Hide (1954), Friz Freleng
- Claws for Alarm (1954), Chuck Jones
- Little Boy Boo (1954), Robert McKimson
- Devil May Hare (1954), Robert McKimson
- Muzzle Tough (1954), Friz Freleng
- The Oily American (1954), Robert McKimson
- Bewitched Bunny (1954), Chuck Jones
- Satan's Waitin' (1954), Friz Freleng
- Stop! Look! And Hasten! (1954), Chuck Jones
- Yankee Doodle Bugs (1954), Friz Freleng
- Gone Batty (1954), Robert McKimson
- Goo Goo Goliath (1954), Friz Freleng
- By Word of Mouse (1954), Friz Freleng
- From A to Z-Z-Z-Z (1954), Chuck Jones
- Quack Shot (1954), Robert McKimson
- My Little Duckaroo (1954), Chuck Jones
- Sheep Ahoy (1954), Chuck Jones
- Baby Buggy Bunny (1954), Chuck Jones
- Pizzicato Pussycat (1955), Friz Freleng
- Feather Dusted (1955), Robert McKimson
- Pests for Guests (1955), Friz Freleng
- Beanstalk Bunny (1955), Chuck Jones
- All Fowled Up (1955), Robert McKimson
- Stork Naked (1955), Friz Freleng
- Lighthouse Mouse (1955), Robert McKimson
- Sahara Hare (1955), Friz Freleng
- Sandy Claws (1955), Friz Freleng
- The Hole Idea (1955), Robert McKimson
- Ready, Set, Zoom! (1955), Chuck Jones
- Hare Brush (1955), Friz Freleng
- Past Perfumance (1955), Chuck Jones
- Tweety's Circus (1955), Friz Freleng
- Rabbit Rampage (1955), Chuck Jones
- Lumber Jerks (1955), Friz Freleng
- This Is a Life? (1955), Friz Freleng
- Double or Mutton (1955), Chuck Jones
- Jumpin' Jupiter (1955), Chuck Jones
- A Kiddie's Kitty (1955), Friz Freleng
- Hyde and Hare (1955), Friz Freleng
- Dime to Retire (1955), Robert McKimson
- Speedy Gonzales (1955), Friz Freleng
- Knight-mare Hare (1955), Chuck Jones
- Two Scent's Worth (1955), Chuck Jones
- Red Riding Hoodwinked (1955), Friz Freleng
- Roman Legion-Hare (1955), Friz Freleng
- Heir-Conditioned (1955), Friz Freleng
- Guided Muscle (1955), Chuck Jones
- Pappy's Puppy (1955), Friz Freleng
- One Froggy Evening (1955), Chuck Jones
- Bugs' Bonnets (1956), Chuck Jones
- Too Hop to Handle (1956), Robert McKimson
- Weasel Stop (1956), Robert McKimson
- The High and the Flighty (1956), Robert McKimson
- Broom-Stick Bunny (1956), Chuck Jones
- Rocket Squad (1956), Chuck Jones
- Tweet and Sour (1956), Friz Freleng
- Heaven Scent (1956), Chuck Jones
- Mixed Master (1956), Robert McKimson
- Rabbitson Crusoe (1956), Friz Freleng
- Gee Whiz-z-z-z-z-z-z (1956), Chuck Jones
- Tree Cornered Tweety (1956), Friz Freleng
- The Unexpected Pest (1956), Robert McKimson
- Napoleon Bunny-Part (1956), Friz Freleng
- Tugboat Granny (1956), Friz Freleng
- Stupor Duck (1956), Robert McKimson
- Barbary Coast Bunny (1956), Chuck Jones
- Rocket-bye Baby (1956), Chuck Jones
- Half-Fare Hare (1956), Robert McKimson
- Raw! Raw! Rooster! (1956), Robert McKimson
- The Slap-Hoppy Mouse (1956), Robert McKimson
- A Star Is Bored (1956), Friz Freleng
- Deduce, You Say (1956), Chuck Jones
- Yankee Dood It (1956), Friz Freleng
- Wideo Wabbit (1956), Robert McKimson
- There They Go-Go-Go! (1956), Chuck Jones
- Two Crows from Tacos (1956), Friz Freleng
- The Honey-Mousers (1956), Robert McKimson
- To Hare Is Human (1956), Chuck Jones
- Three Little Bops (1957), Friz Freleng
- Tweet Zoo (1957), Friz Freleng
- Scrambled Aches (1957), Chuck Jones
- Ali Baba Bunny (1957), Chuck Jones
- Go Fly a Kit (1957), Chuck Jones
- Tweety and the Beanstalk (1957), Friz Freleng
- Bedeviled Rabbit (1957), Robert McKimson
- Boyhood Daze (1957), Chuck Jones
- Cheese It, the Cat! (1957), Robert McKimson
- Fox-Terror (1957), Robert McKimson
- Tweety and the Beanstalk (1957), Friz Freleng
- Piker's Peak (1957), Friz Freleng
- Steal Wool (1957), Chuck Jones
- Boston Quackie (1957), Robert McKimson
- What's Opera, Doc? (1957), Chuck Jones
- Tabasco Road (1957), Robert McKimson
- Birds Anonymous (1957), Friz Freleng
- Ducking the Devil (1957), Robert McKimson
- Bugsy and Mugsy (1957), Friz Freleng
- Zoom and Bored (1957), Chuck Jones
- Greedy for Tweety (1957), Friz Freleng
- Touché and Go (1957), Chuck Jones
- Show Biz Bugs (1957), Friz Freleng
- Mouse-Taken Identity (1957), Robert McKimson
- Gonzales' Tamales (1957), Friz Freleng
- Rabbit Romeo (1957), Robert McKimson
- Don't Axe Me (1958), Robert McKimson
- Tortilla Flaps (1958), Robert McKimson
- Hare-Less Wolf (1958), Friz Freleng
- A Pizza Tweety Pie (1958), Friz Freleng
- Robin Hood Daffy (1958), Chuck Jones
- Hare-Way to the Stars (1958), Chuck Jones
- Whoa, Be-Gone! (1958), Chuck Jones
- A Waggily Tale (1958), Friz Freleng
- Feather Bluster (1958), Robert McKimson
- Now Hare This (1958), Robert McKimson
- To Itch His Own (1958), Chuck Jones
- Dog Tales (1958), Robert McKimson
- Knighty Knight Bugs (1958), Friz Freleng
- Weasel While You Work (1958), Robert McKimson
- A Bird in a Bonnet (1958), Friz Freleng
- Hook, Line and Stinker (1958), Chuck Jones
- Pre-Hysterical Hare (1958), Robert McKimson
- Gopher Broke (1958), Robert McKimson
- Hip Hip-Hurry! (1958), Chuck Jones
- Cat Feud (1958), Chuck Jones
- Baton Bunny (1959), Chuck Jones, Abe Levitow
- Mouse-Placed Kitten (1959), Robert McKimson
- China Jones (1959), Robert McKimson
- Hare-Abian Nights (1959), Ken Harris
- Trick or Tweet (1959), Friz Freleng
- The Mouse That Jack Built (1959), Robert McKimson
- Apes of Wrath (1959), Friz Freleng
- Hot-Rod and Reel! (1959), Chuck Jones
- A Mutt in a Rut (1959), Robert McKimson
- Backwoods Bunny (1959), Robert McKimson
- Really Scent (1959), Abe Levitow
- Mexicali Shmoes (1959), Friz Freleng
- Tweet and Lovely (1959), Friz Freleng
- Wild and Woolly Hare (1959), Friz Freleng
- Cat's Paw (1959), Robert McKimson
- Here Today, Gone Tamale (1959), Friz Freleng
- Bonanza Bunny (1959), Robert McKimson
- A Broken Leghorn (1959), Robert McKimson
- Wild About Hurry (1959), Chuck Jones
- A Witch's Tangled Hare (1959), Abe Levitow
- Unnatural History (1959), Abe Levitow
- Tweet Dreams (1959), Friz Freleng
- People Are Bunny (1959), Robert McKimson
- Fastest with the Mostest (1960), Chuck Jones
- West of the Pesos (1960), Robert McKimson
- Horse Hare (1960), Friz Freleng
- Wild Wild World (1960), Robert McKimson
- Goldimouse and the Three Cats (1960), Friz Freleng
- Person to Bunny (1960), Friz Freleng
- Who Scent You? (1960), Chuck Jones
- Hyde and Go Tweet (1960), Friz Freleng
- Rabbit's Feat (1960), Chuck Jones
- Crockett-Doodle-Do (1960), Robert McKimson
- Mouse and Garden (1960), Friz Freleng
- Ready, Woolen and Able (1960), Chuck Jones
- Mice Follies (1960), Robert McKimson
- From Hare to Heir (1960), Friz Freleng
- The Dixie Fryer (1960), Robert McKimson
- Hopalong Casualty (1960), Chuck Jones
- Trip for Tat (1960), Friz Freleng
- Dog Gone People (1960), Robert McKimson
- High Note (1960), Chuck Jones
- Lighter Than Hare (1960), Friz Freleng
- Cannery Woe (1961), Robert McKimson
- Zip 'N Snort (1961), Chuck Jones
- Hoppy Daze (1961), Robert McKimson
- The Mouse on 57th Street (1961), Chuck Jones
- Strangled Eggs (1961), Robert McKimson
- Birds of a Father (1961), Robert McKimson
- D' Fightin' Ones (1961), Friz Freleng
- The Abominable Snow Rabbit (1961), Chuck Jones, Maurice Noble
- Lickety-Splat (1961), Chuck Jones, Abe Levitow
- A Scent of the Matterhorn (1961), Chuck Jones
- Rebel Without Claws (1961), Friz Freleng
- Compressed Hare (1961), Chuck Jones, Maurice Noble
- The Pied Piper of Guadalupe (1961), Friz Freleng, Hawley Pratt
- Prince Violent (1961), Friz Freleng, Hawley Pratt
- Daffy's Inn Trouble (1961), Robert McKimson
- What's My Lion? (1961), Robert McKimson
- Beep Prepared (1961), Chuck Jones, Maurice Noble
- The Last Hungry Cat (1961), Friz Freleng, Hawley Pratt
- Nelly's Folly (1961), Chuck Jones, Abe Levitow, Maurice Noble
- Wet Hare (1962), Robert McKimson
- A Sheep in the Deep (1962), Chuck Jones, Maurice Noble
- Fish and Slips (1962), Robert McKimson
- Quackodile Tears (1962), Arthur Davis
- Crow's Feat (1962), Friz Freleng, Hawley Pratt
- Mexican Boarders (1962), Friz Freleng, Hawley Pratt
- Bill of Hare (1962), Robert McKimson
- Zoom at the Top (1962), Chuck Jones, Maurice Noble
- The Slick Chick (1962), Robert McKimson
- Louvre Come Back to Me! (1962), Chuck Jones, Maurice Noble
- Honey's Money (1962), Friz Freleng
- The Jet Cage (1962), Friz Freleng
- Mother Was a Rooster (1962), Robert McKimson
- Good Noose (1962), Robert McKimson
- Shiskabugs (1962), Friz Freleng
- Martian Through Georgia (1962), Chuck Jones, Abe Levitow, Maurice Noble
- I Was a Teenage Thumb (1963), Chuck Jones, Maurice Noble
- Devil's Feud Cake (1963), Friz Freleng
- Fast Buck Duck (1963), Robert McKimson, Ted Bonnicksen
- The Million Hare (1963), Robert McKimson
- Mexican Cat Dance (1963), Friz Freleng
- Now Hear This (1963), Chuck Jones, Maurice Noble
- Woolen Under Where (1963), Phil Monroe, Richard Thompson
- Hare-Breadth Hurry (1963), Chuck Jones, Maurice Noble
- Banty Raids (1963), Robert McKimson
- Chili Weather (1963), Friz Freleng
- The Unmentionables (1963), Friz Freleng
- Aqua Duck (1963), Robert McKimson
- Mad as a Mars Hare (1963), Chuck Jones, Maurice Noble
- Claws in the Lease (1963), Robert McKimson
- Transylvania 6-5000 (1963), Chuck Jones, Maurice Noble
- To Beep or Not to Beep (1963), Chuck Jones, Maurice Noble
- Dumb Patrol (1964), Gerry Chiniquy
- A Message to Gracias (1964), Robert McKimson
- Bartholomew Versus the Wheel (1964), Robert McKimson
- Freudy Cat (1964), Robert McKimson
- Dr. Devil and Mr. Hare (1964), Robert McKimson
- Nuts and Volts (1964), Friz Freleng
- The Iceman Ducketh (1964), Phil Monroe, Maurice Noble
- War and Pieces (1964), Chuck Jones, Maurice Noble
- Hawaiian Aye Aye (1964), Gerry Chiniquy
- False Hare (1964), Robert McKimson
- Señorella and the Glass Huarache (1964), Hawley Pratt
- Pancho's Hideaway (1964), Friz Freleng, Hawley Pratt
- Road to Andalay (1964), Friz Freleng, Hawley Pratt
- It's Nice to Have a Mouse Around the House (1965), Friz Freleng, Hawley Pratt
- Cats and Bruises (1965), Friz Freleng, Hawley Pratt
- The Wild Chase (1965), Friz Freleng, Hawley Pratt
- Moby Duck (1965), Robert McKimson
- Assault and Peppered (1965), Robert McKimson
- Well Worn Daffy (1965), Robert McKimson
- Suppressed Duck (1965), Robert McKimson
- Corn on the Cop (1965), Irv Spector
- Rushing Roulette (1965), Robert McKimson
- Run, Run, Sweet Road Runner (1965), Rudy Larriva
- Tease for Two (1965), Robert McKimson
- Tired and Feathered (1965), Rudy Larriva
- Boulder Wham! (1965), Rudy Larriva
- Chili Corn Corny (1965), Robert McKimson
- Just Plane Beep (1965), Rudy Larriva
- Hairied and Hurried (1965), Rudy Larriva
- Go Go Amigo (1965), Robert McKimson
- Highway Runnery (1965), Rudy Larriva
- Chaser on the Rocks (1965), Rudy Larriva
- The Astroduck (1966), Robert McKimson
- Shot and Bothered (1966), Rudy Larriva
- Out and Out Rout (1966), Rudy Larriva
- Mucho Locos (1966), Robert McKimson
- The Solid Tin Coyote (1966), Rudy Larriva
- Mexican Mousepiece (1966), Robert McKimson
- Clippety Clobbered (1966), Rudy Larriva
- Daffy Rents (1966), Robert McKimson
- A-Haunting We Will Go (1966), Robert McKimson
- Snow Excuse (1966), Robert McKimson
- A Squeak in the Deep (1966), Robert McKimson
- Feather Finger (1966), Robert McKimson
- Swing Ding Amigo (1966), Robert McKimson
- Sugar and Spies (1966), Robert McKimson
- A Taste of Catnip (1966), Robert McKimson
- Daffy's Diner (1967), Robert McKimson
- Quacker Tracker (1967), Rudy Larriva
- The Music Mice-Tro (1967), Rudy Larriva
- The Spy Swatter (1967), Rudy Larriva
- Speedy Ghost to Town (1967), Alex Lovy
- Rodent to Stardom (1967), Alex Lovy
- Go Away Stowaway (1967), Alex Lovy
- Cool Cat (1967), Alex Lovy
- Merlin the Magic Mouse (1967), Alex Lovy
- Fiesta Fiasco (1967), Alex Lovy
- Hocus Pocus Pow Wow (1968), Alex Lovy
- Norman Normal (1968), Alex Lovy
- Big Game Haunt (1968), Alex Lovy
- Skyscraper Caper (1968), Alex Lovy
- Hippydrome Tiger (1968), Alex Lovy
- Feud with a Dude (1968), Alex Lovy
- See Ya Later Gladiator (1968), Alex Lovy
- 3 Ring Wing-Ding (1968), Alex Lovy
- Flying Circus (1968), Alex Lovy
- Chimp and Zee (1968), Alex Lovy
- Bunny and Claude (1968), Robert McKimson
- The Great Carrot Train Robbery (1969), Robert McKimson
- Fistic Mystic (1969), Robert McKimson
- Rabbit Stew and Rabbits Too! (1969), Robert McKimson
- Shamrock and Roll (1969), Robert McKimson
- Bugged by a Bee (1969), Robert McKimson
- Injun Trouble (1969), Robert McKimson

=== Fleischer Studios ===
- Swing You Sinners! (1930), Dave Fleischer
- Bimbo's Initiation (1931), Dave Fleischer
- Minnie the Moocher (1932), Dave Fleischer
- Snow White (1933), Dave Fleischer
- Popeye the Sailor (1933), Dave Fleischer
- Poor Cinderella (1934), Dave Fleischer
- A Dream Walking (1934), Dave Fleischer
- Somewhere in Dreamland (1936), Dave Fleischer
- Popeye the Sailor Meets Sindbad the Sailor (1936), Dave Fleischer
- Popeye the Sailor Meets Ali Baba's Forty Thieves (1937), Dave Fleischer
- Goonland (1938), Dave Fleischer
- Aladdin and His Wonderful Lamp (1939), Dave Fleischer
- Yip Yip Yippy (1939), Dave Fleischer
- Granite Hotel (1940), Dave Fleischer
- King for a Day (1940), Dave Fleischer
- Raggedy Ann and Raggedy Andy (1941), Dave Fleischer
- Superman (1941), Dave Fleischer
- The Mechanical Monsters (1941), Dave Fleischer
- Billion Dollar Limited (1942), Dave Fleischer
- The Arctic Giant (1942), Dave Fleischer
- The Bulleteers (1942), Dave Fleischer
- The Magnetic Telescope (1942), Dave Fleischer
- Electric Earthquake (1942), Dave Fleischer
- Volcano (1942), Dave Fleischer
- Terror on the Midway (1942), Dave Fleischer

=== Famous Studios ===
- You're a Sap, Mr. Jap (1942), Dan Gordon
- Japoteurs (1942), Seymour Kneitel
- Showdown (1942), Isadore Sparber
- Eleventh Hour (1942), Dan Gordon
- Scrap the Japs (1942), Seymour Kneitel
- Destruction, Inc. (1942), Isadore Sparber
- Me Musical Nephews (1942), Seymour Kneitel
- Seein' Red, White 'N' Blue (1943), Dan Gordon
- The Mummy Strikes (1943), Isadore Sparber
- Spinach Fer Britain (1943), Isadore Sparber
- Jungle Drums (1943), Dan Gordon
- The Underground World (1943), Seymour Kneitel
- Secret Agent (1943), Seymour Kneitel
- Pop-Pie a la Mode (1945), Isadore Sparber
- The Friendly Ghost (1945), Isadore Sparber
- Old MacDonald Had a Farm (1946), Seymour Kneitel
- Olive Oyl for President (1948), Isadore Sparber
- There's Good Boos To-Night (1948), Isadore Sparber
- A Haunting We Will Go (1949), Seymour Kneitel
- Song of the Birds (1949), Bill Tytla
- Ancient Fistory (1953), Seymour Kneitel
- Popeye, the Ace of Space (1953), Seymour Kneitel
- Fright to the Finish (1954), Seymour Kneitel
- Spooky Swabs (1957), Isadore Sparber

=== M. J. Winkler ===
- Felix Finds Out (1924), Pat Sullivan
- Fiery Fireman (1928), Friz Freleng and Rudolph Ising
- Yanky Clippers (1929), Walter Lantz and Tom Palmer
- Sick Cylinders (1929), Ben Clopton
- Alpine Antics (1929), Tom Palmer
- Jungle Jingles (1929), Ben Clopton
- Weary Willies (1929), Friz Freleng

=== MGM ===
- Peace on Earth (1939), Hugh Harman
- The Milky Way (1940), Rudolf Ising
- Puss Gets the Boot (1940), William Hanna and Joseph Barbera
- The Midnight Snack (1941), William Hanna and Joseph Barbera
- The Night Before Christmas (1941), William Hanna and Joseph Barbera
- The Yankee Doodle Mouse (1943), William Hanna and Joseph Barbera
- Dumb-Hounded (1943), Tex Avery
- Red Hot Riding Hood (1943), Tex Avery
- Mouse Trouble (1944), William Hanna and Joseph Barbera
- Quiet Please! (1945), William Hanna and Joseph Barbera
- Solid Serenade (1946), William Hanna and Joseph Barbera
- The Cat Concerto (1947), William Hanna and Joseph Barbera
- Dr. Jekyll and Mr. Mouse (1947), William Hanna and Joseph Barbera
- King-Size Canary (1947), Tex Avery
- The Little Orphan (1948), William Hanna and Joseph Barbera
- The Two Mouseketeers (1951), William Hanna and Joseph Barbera
- Johann Mouse (1953), William Hanna and Joseph Barbera

=== Walter Lantz Productions ===
- Race Riot, (1929), Walter Lantz
- The Plumber, (1933), Bill Nolan
- Confidence, (1933), Bill Nolan
- Ham and Eggs, (1933) Bill Nolan
- Parking Space, (1933) Bill Nolan
- The County Fair, (1934) Bill Nolan
- Knock Knock (1940), Walter Lantz
- The Barber of Seville (1944), James Culhane
- Apple Andy (1946), Dick Lundy
- Musical Moments from Chopin (1947), Dick Lundy
- Sh-h-h-h-h-h (1955), Tex Avery
- Crazy Mixed-Up Pup (1955), Tex Avery
- The Legend of Rockabye Point (1955), Tex Avery

=== Terrytoons/Van Beuren ===
- The Window Washers (1925), Harry Bailey, John Foster, Frank Moser, Jerry Shields
- Closer Than a Brother (1925), Harry Bailey, John Foster, Frank Moser, Jerry Shields
- Small Town Sheriff (1927), Harry Bailey, John Foster, Frank Moser, Jerry Shields
- River of Doubt (1927), Paul Terry
- Dinner Time (1928), Paul Terry and John Foster
- The Wild Goose Chase (1932), John Foster and Mannie Davis
- Silvery Moon (1933), John Foster and Mannie Davis
- Farmer Al Falfa's Prize Package (1936), Mannie Davis and George Gordon
- Skunked Again (1936), Mannie Davis and George Gordon
- Red Hot Music (1937), Mannie Davis and George Gordon
- The Hay Ride (1937), Mannie Davis and George Gordon
- The Mouse of Tomorrow (1942), Eddie Donnelly
- My Boy, Johnny (1943), Paul Terry
- Mighty Mouse in Gypsy Life (1945), Eddie Donnelly
- The Talking Magpies (1946), Mannie Davis
- Flebus (1956), Gene Deitch
- Tom Terrific (1957), Gene Deitch
- Sidney's Family Tree (1958), Gene Deitch

=== Charles Mintz/Screen Gems (Columbia) ===
- Ratskin (1929), Ben Harrison and Manny Gould
- Farm Relief (1929), Ben Harrison, cartoonist, Manny Gould and Friz Freleng
- Toby the Showman (1930), Dick Huemer and Sid Marcus
- Down South (1931), Dick Huemer and Sid Marcus
- Weenie Roast (1931), Ben Harrison and Manny Gould
- Yelp Wanted (1931), Dick Huemer
- Piano Mover (1931), Ben Harrison and Manny Gould
- Birth of Jazz, Ben Harrison and Manny Gould
- Russian Dressing, Ben Harrison and Manny Gould
- Krazy Spooks (1933), Ben Harrison and Manny Gould
- The Bill Poster (1933), Ben Harrison and Manny Gould
- Holiday Land (1934), Sid Marcus and Art Davis
- The Little Match Girl (1937), Sid Marcus and Art Davis
- The Fox and the Grapes (1941), Frank Tashlin
- Song of Victory (1942), Bob Wickersham
- Willoughby's Magic Hat (1943), Bob Wickersham
- Flora (1948), Alex Lovy

=== UPA ===
- Hell-Bent for Election (1944), Chuck Jones
- Brotherhood of Man (1946), Bobe Cannon
- Ragtime Bear (1949), John Hubley
- Gerald McBoing-Boing (1951), Bobe Cannon
- Rooty Toot Toot (1952), John Hubley
- The Tell-Tale Heart (1953), Ted Parmelee (direction), Paul Julian (design)
- When Magoo Flew (1955), Pete Burness

=== Others ===
- Fiddlesticks (1930), Ub Iwerks
- Room Runners (1932), Ub Iwerks
- The Goose That Laid the Golden Egg (1936), Burt Gillett
- The Pink Phink (1964), Friz Freleng, DePatie–Freleng Enterprises
- In a Heartbeat (2017), Ringling College of Art and Design

== See also ==
- List of machinima works
- List of one-shot Metro-Goldwyn-Mayer animated shorts
- List of Pixar shorts
- List of theatrical animated short film series
- List of Walt Disney Animation Studios short films
- List of Warner Bros. Cartoons productions
