= Alpine Antics =

Alpine Antics may refer to:

- Alpine Antics (1929 film), an animated cartoon featuring Oswald the Lucky Rabbit
- Alpine Antics (1936 film), a Looney Tunes animated cartoon
