= Robert Stokes (animator) =

American animator

Robert George Stokes (1908-1980), was an American animator born in Palm Springs, California.

He worked for studios between 1932 and 1941, including Harman-Ising Productions, Animated Pictures Corp., Walt Disney Productions and Leon Schlesinger Productions.

== Career ==
At the beginning of 1930s, Stokes was an instructor at the Chouinard School of Art. He first worked with Hugh Harman at Harman-Ising Productions, and became a Walt Disney Productions employee in January 1937. Stokes remained with Disney through 1940, where he animated Katharine Hepburn as Little Bo Peep in "Mother Goose Goes Hollywood", and was an animator on the "Nutcracker Suite" segment of Fantasia.

David Johnson of Animation Artist Magazine said that in the 1937 film Snow White and the Seven Dwarfs, Stokes' drawing of Snow White preparing to take a bite out of an apple is "perhaps the single most published drawing of the film's heroine". According to Johnson, Stokes' contribution to the film "has gone so long unrecognized".

In 1940, he co-founded Stokes-Edmonds Productions with Paul Edmonds, who worked for Boris Morros Productions. The company intended to create technicolor animated cartoons about "Sassy Sis", a girl who was red-headed and five years old.

== Filmography ==
- 1933: Bosko's Knight-Mare
- 1933: Bosko the Musketeer
- 1934: Rasslin' Round
- 1934: The Good Scout
- 1937: The Old Mill
- 1937: Snow White and the Seven Dwarfs
- 1940: Fantasia
