= Sick Cylinders =

1929 film by Hugh Harman and Ben Clopton

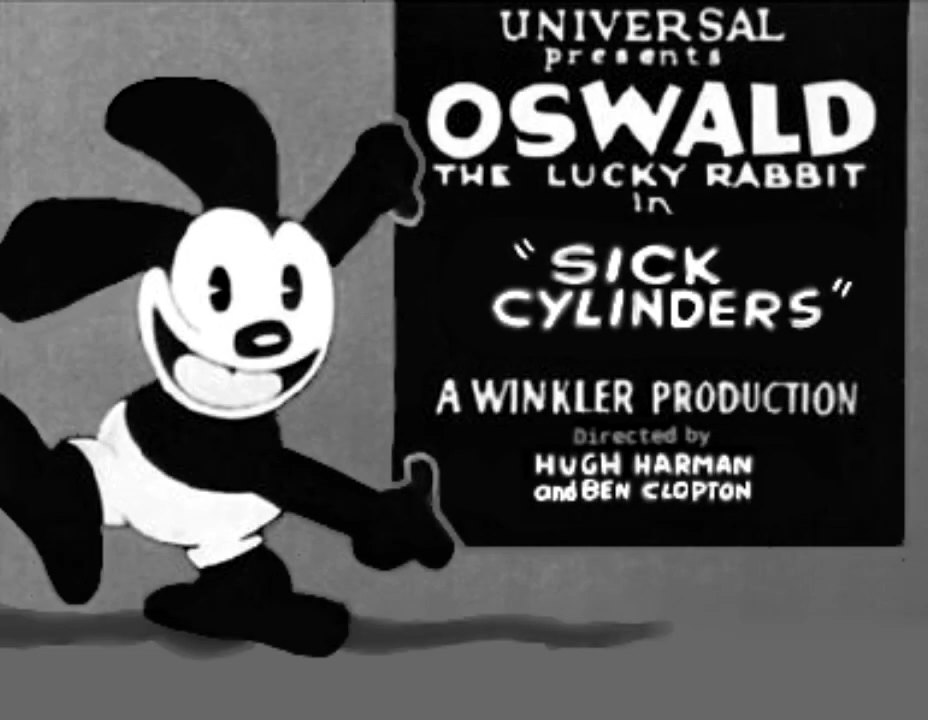
- Title card
- Directed by: Hugh Harman; Ben Clopton
- Produced by: George Winkler
- Music by: Bert Fiske
- Animation by: Hugh Harman; Ben Clopton
- Color process: Black and white
- Production company: Winkler Pictures
- Distributed by: Universal Pictures
- Release date: February 18, 1929
- Running time: 5:43
- Country: United States
- Language: English

Sick Cylinders is a 1929 American animated short film directed by Hugh Harman and Ben Clopton. It stars Oswald the Lucky Rabbit. It is the earliest known Oswald sound cartoon to survive, though the soundtrack remains lost.

The film

== Plot ==
Oswald is driving his uncovered car through the countryside. One day, he stops by a two-story house to pick up his date, Ortensia, one girl cat. When both are on board, they attempt to hit the road. To their surprise, the car breaks down. Oswald steps out to fix the vehicle while the girl cat impatiently waits.

While Oswald is fixing it, a terrier comes by, wanting to play fetch. Every time the rabbit hurls a stick, the terrier comes back with a bigger one. This goes on until the terrier returns with a huge log, dropping it on the car's front as well as flattening Oswald underneath. Tired of playing games, Oswald kicks away the little mutt and resumes working on the car.

In no time, the car is repaired and ready to go. Oswald and the girl cat finally set off, but their journey is far from a smooth one because they have to dodge large rocks on the way which they do successfully. More trouble comes as the two riders see a boulder rolling toward them from behind. Finding no way to escape, they run off a cliff where they plunge into a pond, splashing out all the water.

In the dry pit which is what is left of the pond, the car is capsized. Oswald and his girlfriend are lying on the ground. The girl cat then stands up and expresses her disgust. Momentarily, a bear (which is Peg Leg Pete) in a luxuriant car stops by. The bear invites the girl cat, who is most flattered, to come along. She then takes a seat and the luxuriant car then departs. Oswald is left behind, frustrated, and kicking his own vehicle.

== See also ==
- Oswald the Lucky Rabbit filmography
