= When the Cat's Away (1929 film) =

1929 film by Walt Disney

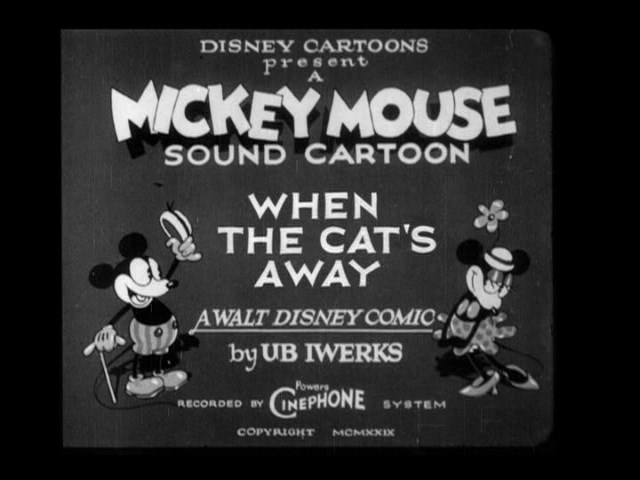
- Title card
- Directed by: Walt Disney
- Produced by: Walt Disney
- Music by: Carl Stalling
- Animation by: Ub Iwerks; Ben Sharpsteen
- Color process: Black & white
- Production company: Disney Cartoons
- Distributed by: Celebrity Productions
- Release date: May 3, 1929
- Running time: 6:42
- Country: United States
- Language: English

When the Cat's Away is a 1929 American animated short film directed by Walt Disney. It is the sixth film of the Mickey Mouse film series. It was animated by Ub Iwerks and Ben Sharpsteen. It was the sixth Mickey Mouse short to be produced, the third of that year. In this cartoon, Mickey and Minnie are the size of regular mice, and Tom Cat is the size of a person. It was released on May 3, 1929 by Celebrity Productions. Columbia Pictures reissued the film after Walt Disney Productions switched distributors.

== Plot ==
The short

After Tom Cat leaves his house, drunk on hooch to go hunting, Mickey organizes all his mice friends to break into the cat's house. Once inside, Mickey and Minnie play the piano by dancing on the keys and, later, others play some of the cat's musical instruments and records (using themselves as the speaker and stylus). In the end, Mickey and Minnie successfully kiss each other.

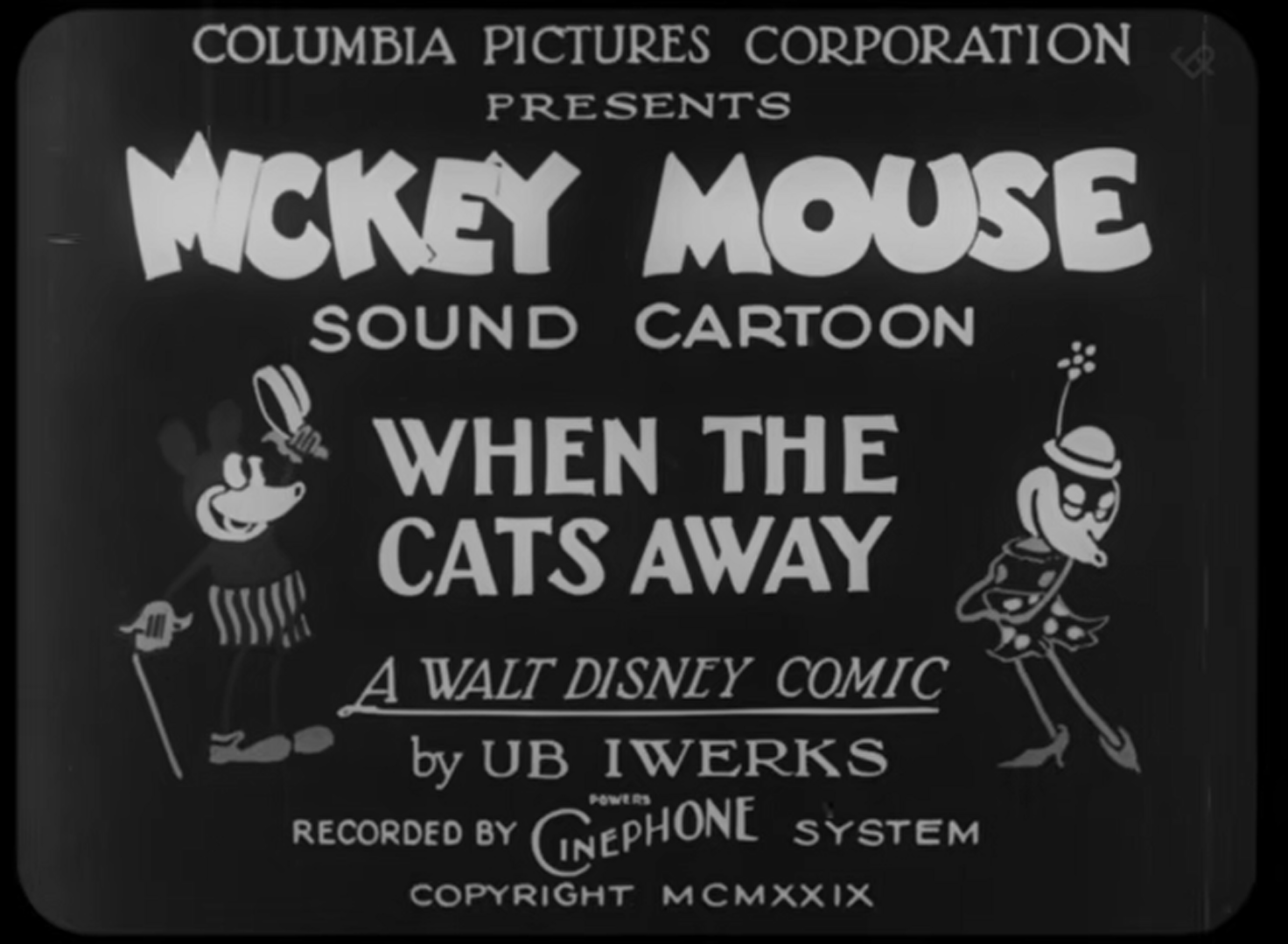
Title card of Columbia Pictures' reissued version

== Production ==
The cartoon is a loose remake of Disney's 1925 film Alice Rattled by Rats, from the Alice Comedies series. This is the last time Mickey is portrayed as the size of a mouse, although he remains fairly small in his next cartoon, The Barnyard Battle.

The cat signs his name "Tom Cat", which was briefly used as a name for the character who was shortly afterwards identified as Peg-Leg Pete, although some sources identify him as Kat Nipp.

In an early script, the cartoon ended with the pet parrot calling the police, causing the mice to scurry away.

== Voice cast ==
- Mickey Mouse: Walt Disney
- Minnie Mouse: Marcellite Garner
- Tom Cat: ???
- Parrot: ???

== Reception ==
Motion Picture News (June 8, 1929): "This is one of the series of the Mickey Mouse cartoons. It is synchronized for sound, which brings the greater part of the laughs. The cat a-hunting goes and the mice play while the cat's away. They play everything from the piano, right down the line of musical instruments."

The Film Daily (July 28, 1929): "Amusing. Mickey and his relatives crash their way into the cat's home while the latter is hunting. The results is a music festival which proves genuinely amusing. As usual in this Disney series, the cartoon work is well thought out and intelligently and divertingly presented. Sure-fire for any audience."

== Home media ==
The short was released on December 7, 2004, on Walt Disney Treasures: Mickey Mouse in Black and White, Volume Two: 1929-1935. It was released to Disney+ on October 6, 2023.

== See also ==
- Mickey Mouse (film series)
