= Jungle Jingles =

1929 film by Ben Clopton

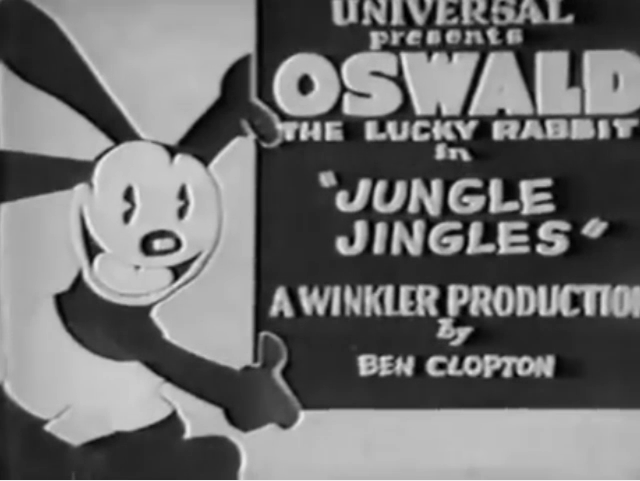
- The title card.
- Directed by: Ben Clopton
- Produced by: George Winkler
- Music by: Bert Fiske
- Color process: Black and white
- Production company: Winkler Pictures
- Distributed by: Universal Pictures
- Release date: July 22, 1929
- Running time: 6:31
- Country: United States
- Language: English

Jungle Jingles

Jungle Jingles is a 1929 American animated short film directed by Ben Clopton. It features Oswald the Lucky Rabbit.

== Plot ==
Oswald is riding on an ostrich, venturing the African jungles. Suddenly, his ostrich decides to make a stop, causing him to be thrown forward. While the disturbed Oswald lets out his dissatisfaction, the large bird lays an egg. The egg hatches, but the offspring chooses to go a separate path rather than to stay with its mother.

Just nearby, an elephant is playing golf using his trunk as a club, and coconuts as balls. The elephant executes a shot but the coconut just veers away from the hole. After missing the next several shots without even scoring once, the frustrated golfer starts striking the coconuts at random directions. One of them strikes Oswald's ostrich, prompting that bird to quickly flee the scene. Oswald too is hit and is dazed for a few seconds.

Annoyed, Oswald confronts and tells the elephant to stop, threatening to attack. Not liking to be commanded by someone, the elephant gives a raspberry as Oswald turns around. Oswald then retaliates as he roughs up and wrestles the elephant to the ground. Momentarily, the elephant's huge father comes by. Seemingly intimidated by the larger pachyderm, Oswald helps the downed son get back on his feet. The elephant walks away, leaving Oswald to face the wrath of his father, but Oswald eventually opens a cage containing a mouse, much to the big elephant's panic.

As the big elephant runs in terror with the mouse chasing, Oswald is laughing out loud. While he does, a squirrel silently walks by and kicks him from behind. Oswald chases the squirrel into a cave, only to be forced back out by something stronger. It turns out that the more powerful creature is a lion as it exits the cave. Oswald quickly makes his getaway.

While running from the lion, Oswald drops tacks on the ground but they barely slow down the big cat. When the two run into a straw house, the tables are turned when Oswald gets his hands on a shotgun which he fires at the lion. Upon running out of bullets, Oswald retreats and takes refuge inside a hollow log. To extract the rabbit from inside, the lion extends its scissor-jacked teeth into the log. Although the jaws close on their target, the lion struggles to pull out Oswald who strongly refuses to be taken, but the scissor-extenders that connect to the lion's teeth detach from its mouth. Returning the ordeal, Oswald uses the extendable teeth to bite back at the lion, and chases the big cat deep into the jungle.

== See also ==
- Oswald the Lucky Rabbit filmography
