= Fiery Firemen =

1928 film by Isadore Freleng and Rudolf Ising

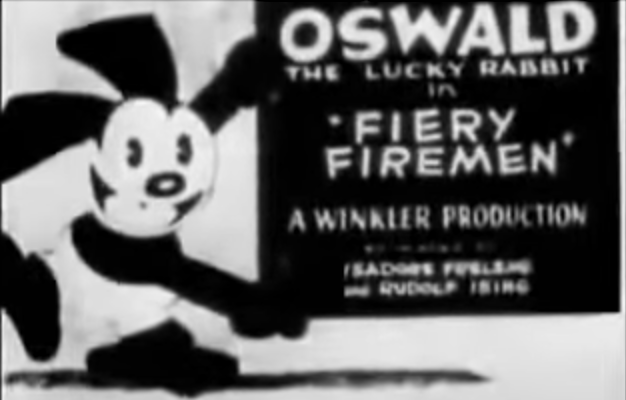
- Title card
- Directed by: Isadore Freleng; Rudolf Ising
- Produced by: George Winkler
- Animation by: Isadore Freleng; Rudolf Ising
- Color process: Black and white
- Production company: Winkler Pictures
- Distributed by: Universal Pictures
- Release date: October 15, 1928
- Running time: 5:46
- Country: United States
- Language: English

Fiery Firemen is a 1928 American animated short film directed by Isadore Freleng and Rudolf Ising. It stars Oswald the Lucky Rabbit. It is among the few Oswald shorts produced after Walt Disney's departure and before Universal Pictures founded their own studio known to still exist.

== Plot ==
The full film

Oswald is a fire fighter who is seen resting in bed inside the fire department. Also lying in bed beside him is his colleague, a horse.

One day, a condo building goes ablaze, and calls for help from the scene are audible miles away. Oswald and his horse are at first reluctant to leave their bed, but still manage to rush toward the site on time.

In their first rescue mission, Oswald scales a building to the floor where stranded mice are waiting. Oswald provides them a long rope which they use to slide down. Next, Oswald and his companion go to another building to rescue a hippo. Inside their targeted room, they find the hippo unconscious and try to carry her out the window. As Oswald starts down the ladder, the hippo awakens. The massive weight of the large animal causes the ladder to collapse and the two occupants plummet down through the sidewalk, leaving a hole. Oswald comes up through a basement door, carrying the hippo single-handedly.

== See also ==
- Oswald the Lucky Rabbit filmography
