= The Barn Dance =

1929 film by Walt Disney

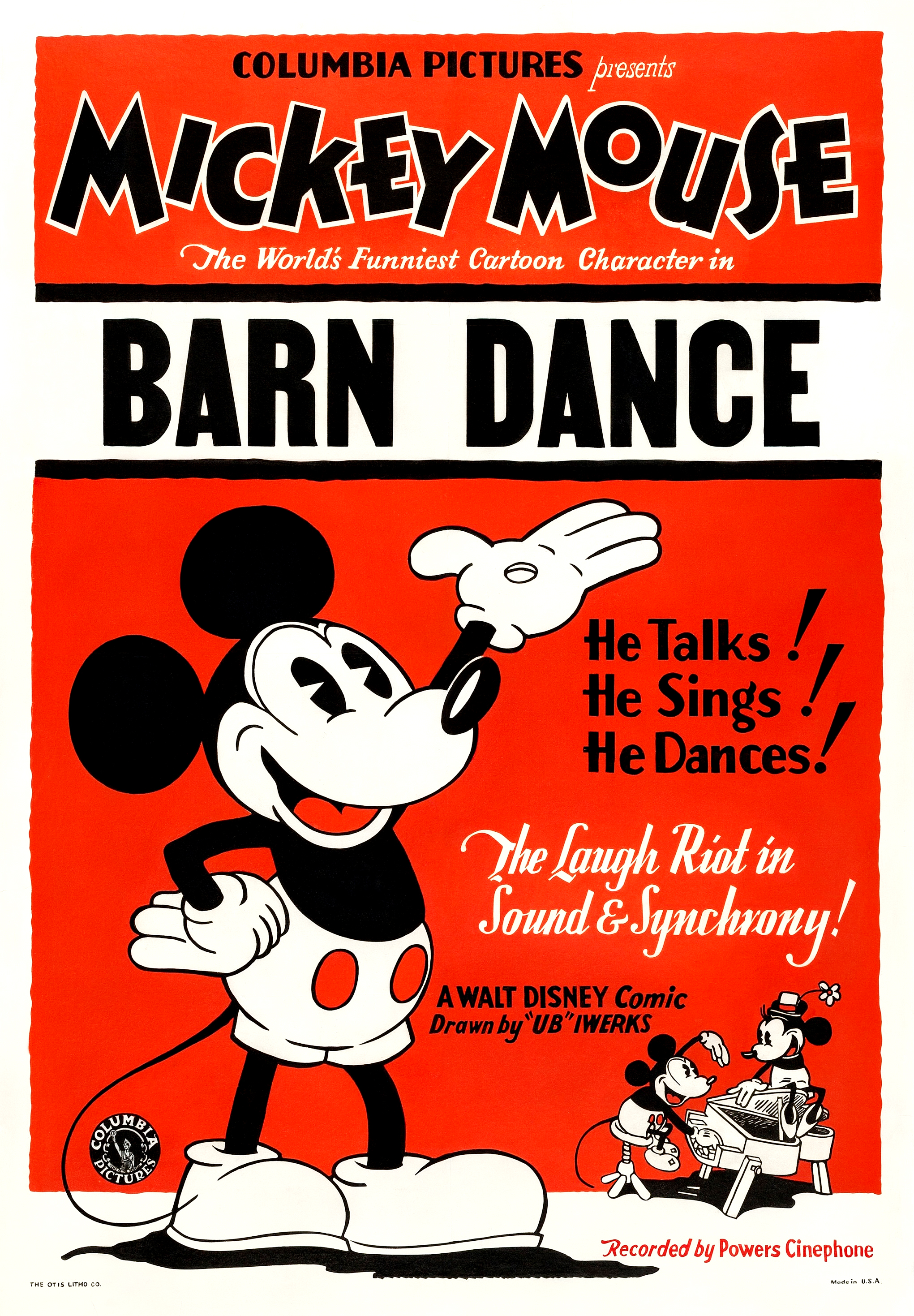
- Directed by: Walt Disney
- Produced by: Walt Disney
- Music by: Carl Stalling
- Animation by: Ub Iwerks; Les Clark
- Color process: Black and white
- Production company: Disney Cartoons
- Distributed by: Celebrity Productions
- Release date: March 14, 1929
- Running time: 7:45
- Country: United States
- Language: English

The Barn Dance is a 1929 American animated short film directed by Walt Disney and animated by Ub Iwerks. It is the third short film in the Mickey Mouse film series. It was released on March 14, 1929 by Celebrity Productions. Columbia Pictures reissued the film after Walt Disney Productions switched distributors.

The short's copyright was renewed on December 10, 1956, so it entered the US public domain on January 1, 2025.

== Plot ==
The full short film The Barn Dance. This video is the Disney+ release with the changed opening music.

The DVD version with original title card audio.

The barn dance of the title is the occasion which brings together Minnie Mouse and her two suitors: Mickey and Pete. The latter two and their vehicles are first seen arriving at Minnie's house in an attempt to pick her up for the dance. Mickey turns up in his horse-cart while Pete in a newly purchased automobile.

Minnie initially chooses Pete to drive her to the dance but the automobile unexpectedly breaks down. She resorts to accepting Mickey's invitation. They are later seen dancing together, but Mickey proves to be a rather clumsy dancer as he repeatedly steps on Minnie's feet. She consequently turns down his invitation for a second dance. She instead accepts that of Pete, who proves to be a better dancing partner.

Mickey then attempts to solve his problem by placing a balloon in his shorts. That apparently helps him to be "light on his feet" and he proceeds to ask Minnie for another dance. She accepts and is surprised to find his dancing skills to have apparently improved. Pete soon discovers Mickey's trick, and makes a slingshot out of his pants and uses it to pop Mickey's balloon. As a result, they both hit the ground and Minnie leaves Mickey and resumes dancing with Pete, leaving a defeated Mickey crying on the floor.

== Production ==
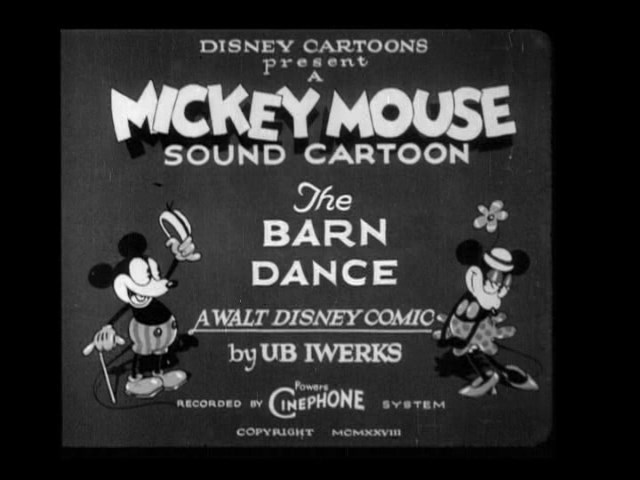
Title card of The Barn Dance.

Like Mickey's previous cartoon, Steamboat Willie, The Barn Dance was planned as a sound cartoon, and there are many sound gags, including Mickey using a passing duck as a horn for his car. The dance also demonstrates the studio's increasing facility with mixing cartoon action with musical rhythm.

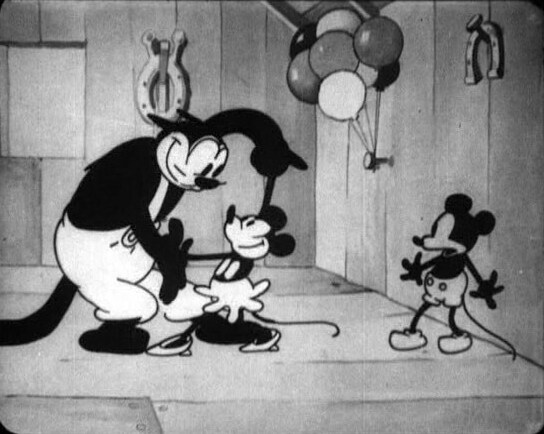
Pete dances with Minnie, to Mickey's horror.

This short is notable for depicting Mickey's incompetence and failure, as most cartoons ensure their characters' success in their pursuits to preserve the films' entertainment value. Pete is unusually depicted in a non-antagonistic manner compared to previous films.

The style of Pete's clothing and car were the inspiration for his appearance in the 2013 short Get a Horse!

== Reception ==
Variety (February 13, 1929): "The Barn Dance has laughs, although a little jerky in spots. It can be spotted anywhere on talking short programs as pleasant relaxation and change of diet from the straightaway shorts with human actors."

Motion Picture News (February 16, 1929): "Walt Disney has evolved another of those animal characters for comedy purposes. This is Mickey Mouse. Mickey is wooing another mousie and takes her to a barn dance with a lot of the usual comedy ticks following. There are some laughs in it."

The Film Daily (February 17, 1929): "This is another of the adventure of Mickey Mouse and his sweetie. The villain cat tries to take gal driving in his auto, which is wrecked. So she goes to the barn dance with Mickey who is driving his carriage drawn by the old plug. This horse is one of the funniest cartoon characters seen in the animateds. Later at the dance the cat shows up and tries to take the gal away again, but Mickey fools him. The sound effects are funny, and this number enhances the usual cartoon subject easily 100 per cent."

== Voice cast ==
- Mickey Mouse: Walt Disney
- Minnie Mouse: Walt Disney
- Pete: Walt Disney

== Home media ==
The short was released on December 7, 2004, on Walt Disney Treasures: Mickey Mouse in Black and White, Volume Two: 1929-1935. It was also made available for streaming on Disney+ in September 2023, albeit with the opening titles altered by adding music from the 1931 cartoon "Mickey's Orphans". The song they added, “Minnie’s Yoo-Hoo”, was not added to the cartoons until “Mickey’s Follies”, released several months after “The Barn Dance”.

== See also ==
- Mickey Mouse (film series)
