= Trash (2025 film) =

2025 French animated short film

- Directed by: Gregory Bouzid; Maxime Crançon; Robin Delaporte; Mattéo Durand; Romain Fleischer; Alexis Le Ral; Margaux Lutz; Fanny Vecchie
- Produced by: ESMA
- Music by: Quentin Chauvineau
- Release date: 2025
- Running time: 6 minutes
- Country: France

Trash is a 2025 French animated short film written and directed by eight French artists during their studies at ESMA, an animation school based in France. The 6-minutes animated film following the rivalry between a rat and a pigeon has been awarded in various international film festivals, including Animayo Gran Canaria and SIGGRAPH. The film also received the BAFTA Student Film Award for Best Animation.

== Plot ==
A rat and a pigeon fight over a piece of pizza, fending, beck and claws, for their survival.

== Accolades ==
Since its release, the film has been selected in various festivals around the world:

Year	Festivals	Award/Category	Status
2025	Animayo Gran Canaria	Best Student Short Film	Won
2025	SIGGRAPH	Best In Show	Won
2025	BAFTA	Student Film Award for Best Animation	Won
2025	Animafest Zagreb	Official Competition	Nominated
