= Farm Relief =

1929 film

- Screenshot
- Directed by: Ben Harrison; Manny Gould
- Produced by: Charles Mintz
- Music by: Joe DeNat
- Animation by: Friz Freleng; Arthur Davis
- Color process: Black and white
- Production company: Charles Mintz Studio
- Distributed by: Columbia Pictures
- Release date: December 30, 1929
- Running time: 7:28
- Language: English

Farm Relief is a 1929 animated short subject produced by Columbia Pictures, featuring Krazy Kat. The film is also the character's fifth to employ sound after the studio made the transition less than a year before.

== Plot ==
The short film

Krazy lives in a barn with his farm animals. Whenever he has no farm work to do, he plays on his piano.

One day a pig in a black coat and sunglasses comes to the farm. He then puts up a stand to sell liquor. His first customer is a cow. The cow, after drinking a few ounces, then heads to tell the other animals. They too are interested as they flock to the stand.

Eventually, Krazy learns of this when he sees an intoxicated chicken. Though he reprimands that fowl for drinking, he also becomes interested when other animals come and offer him a bottle. When he too drinks and gets intoxicated, Krazy celebrates by playing a piano and singing the song Down by the Old Mill Stream. The animals join his singing.

After playing his instrument, Krazy goes to collect milk from a cow. It turns out what he tries to milk is actually a donkey. The angry donkey pushes Krazy back and smashes the pail on his head. A real cow shows up feeling sympathetic for Krazy as the cartoon irises out.

== See also ==
- Krazy Kat filmography
