= The Barnyard Battle =

1929 film by Ub Iwerks

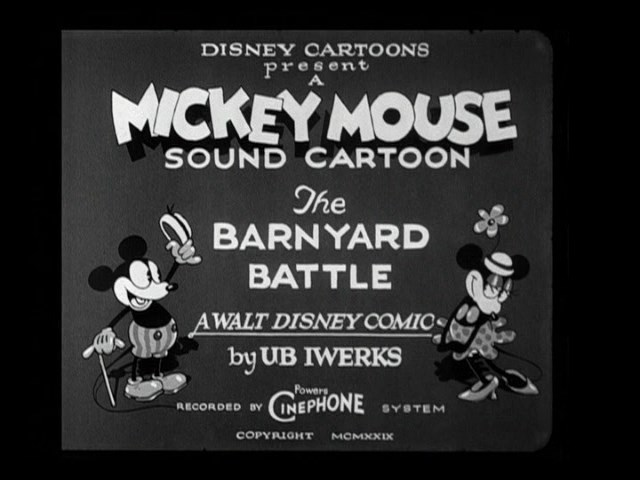
- Directed by: Ub Iwerks
- Produced by: Walt Disney
- Music by: Carl Stalling
- Production company: Disney Cartoons
- Distributed by: Celebrity Productions
- Release date: June 1, 1929
- Running time: 7:22
- Country: United States
- Language: English

The Barnyard Battle is a 1929 American animated short film directed by Ub Iwerks. It is the seventh film of the Mickey Mouse film series. It was the seventh Mickey Mouse short to be produced, the fourth of that year. As the title implies, it features a battle between an invading army of cats and an army of mice trying to defend their homes and farms. It was released on June 1, 1929 by Celebrity Productions. Columbia Pictures reissued the film after Walt Disney Productions switched distributors. The short is in the public domain.

== Plot ==
The short.

Peg-Leg Pete is depicted as a leading soldier of the former army, and Mickey as a conscript of the latter one. Before joining the army, Mickey has to pass a physical examination. This scene depicts Mickey becoming the subject of physical and emotional abuse. After passing the examination, he is given a machine gun and is sent to battle. Mickey's combat efforts are comical in depiction but prove effective enough in forcing the enemy to retreat. In the end, Mickey smacks a line of advancing soldiers on the head with a mallet, and is hailed as a hero by his fellow soldiers.

== Production ==
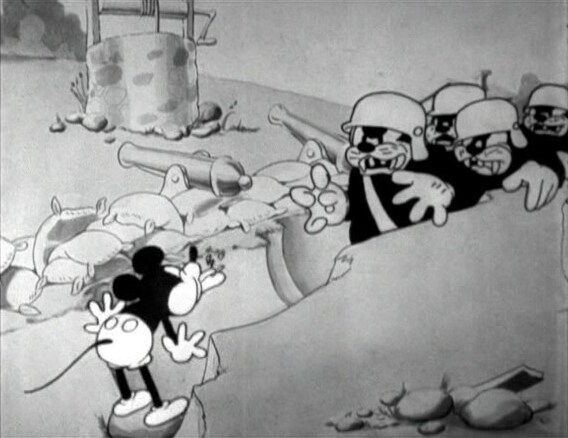
Mickey in the short.

This short is notable as the first to depict Mickey as a soldier and the first to place him in combat. The physical examination scene has since often been edited out, as being somewhat disturbing, but modern viewers have often pointed to this scene as being the most memorable of the short.

There was a precedent in Disney's cartoons for patriotically sending the main character to war for the United States: Julius the Cat calls an army together in the 1926 Alice Comedies short Alice's Little Parade, and Oswald the Lucky Rabbit goes to war in the 1927 cartoon Great Guns!

The mouse officer shouting "Company, forward march!" is the first mammal character in the Mickey Mouse cartoons to speak a full sentence. Before this, characters have only communicated in single-syllable sounds and laughs, or in the case of Minnie Mouse, the greeting, "Yoo-Hoo!" The parrot in Steamboat Willie also spoke two full sentences, making him the actual first character in the series to speak this way.

This is the last Mickey Mouse cartoon in which Mickey is shown as mouse-sized among a crowd of other mice; after this, Mickey and Minnie became the only mice living in a world of other anthropomorphized animals.

The short did not clearly identify the war it depicted, but it has been noted that the cats are depicted as wearing military helmets similar to those used by the German Empire during World War I. On the other hand, the mice are marching in battle to the tune of "Dixie", a song written in 1859. The song was popular among the forces of the Confederate States of America during the American Civil War. The victory of the mice is celebrated in the tune of "Battle Cry of Freedom", known to have been popular among the forces of the United States during the same conflict. In any case, both wars were still within living memory of the audiences at the time of release and so it is possible that the details mentioned were intended as recognizable references to both of them.

Because the cats wear helmets that resemble German pickelhaube, the cartoon was banned in Germany in 1930 on the grounds of being "offensive to national dignity".

== Legacy and influence ==
An LCD Game & Watch-styled mini-game based on the short appears in the 2019 video game Kingdom Hearts III.

== Home media ==
The short was released on December 7, 2004, on Walt Disney Treasures: Mickey Mouse in Black and White, Volume Two: 1929-1935.

== See also ==
- Mickey Mouse (film series)
