= Bosko the Musketeer =

1933 film by Hugh Harman

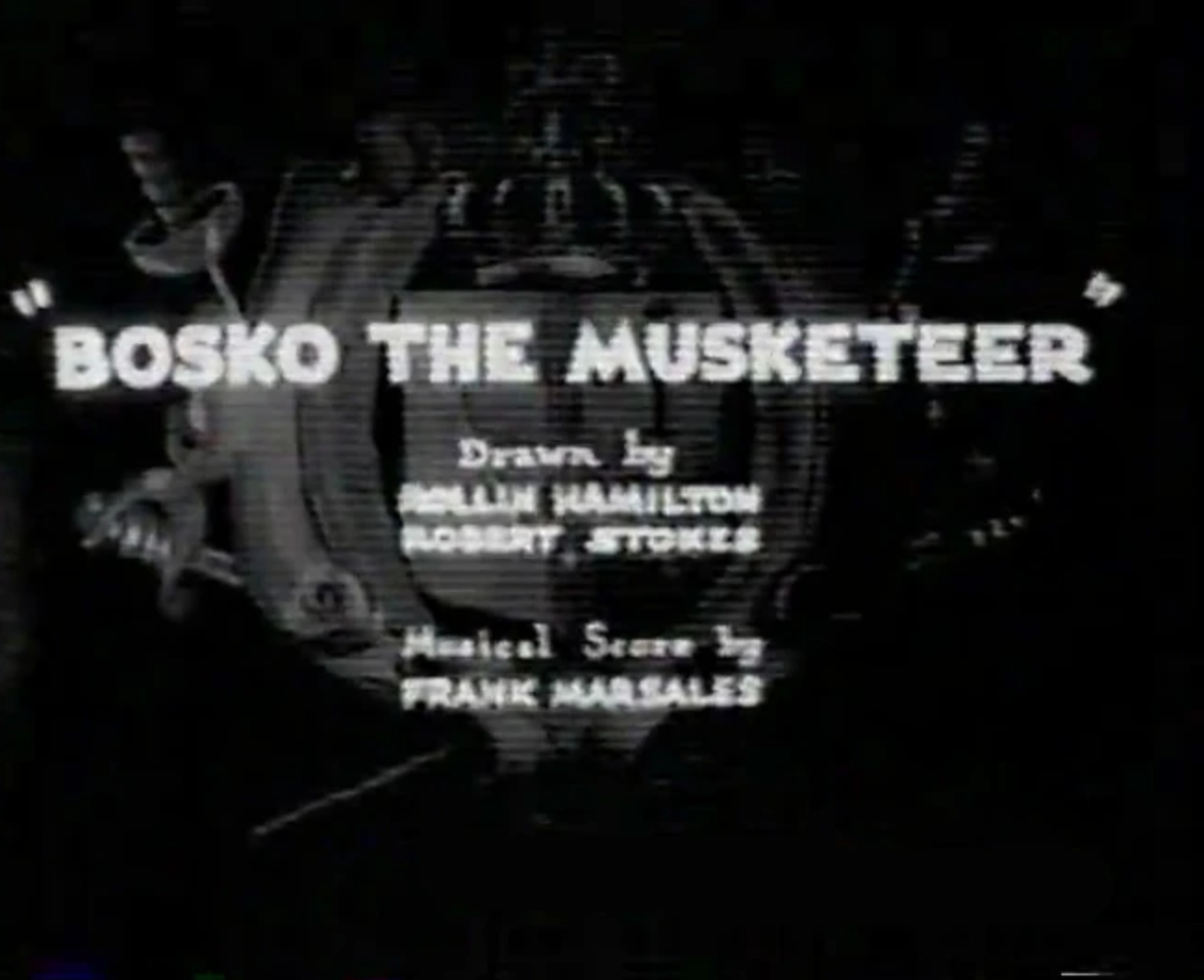
- Title card
- Directed by: Hugh Harman
- Produced by: Hugh Harman; Rudolf Ising; Leon Schlesinger
- Starring: Johnny Murray (uncredited)
- Music by: Frank Marsales
- Animation by: Rollin Hamilton; Robert Stokes
- Color process: Black-and-white
- Production companies: Harman-Ising Productions; Leon Schlesinger Productions
- Distributed by: Warner Bros. Pictures; The Vitaphone Corporation
- Release date: August 12, 1933
- Running time: 7 minutes
- Country: United States
- Language: English

Bosko the Musketeer is an American animated comedy short film directed by Hugh Harman. It is the 37th film in the Looney Tunes series featuring Bosko, and the penultimate film in the series to be produced by Harman-Ising Productions. It was released on August 12, 1933.

== Plot ==
Bosko and Bruno merrily skip through a field of flowers while Honey dusts her house's furniture, humorously her own goldfish as well as a large, framed photograph of Bosko. Bosko walks in just as Honey is dusting her painting of "The Three Musketeers". Bosko claims to be superior to the musketeers and begins to mime their moves as he imagines himself fencing with a crowd, which he subdues by releasing a barrel of water on them before entering a bar.

The Three Musketeers, Athos, Amos 'n' Andy, sing with Bosko, who curves his sword to use as open a bottle of beer which Athos drinks. Elsewhere, a fierce-looking man sneers at them and eats a chicken whole, before using a servant to open a bottle of booze. As Honey enters to sing and dance, the man abducts her, but releases her after Bosko challenges him to a duel.

The match starts after their blades shake hand. The man's blade enlarges as he swings it, forcing Bosko to jump and evade it. The man cut's Bosko's hat, revealing a chicken that distracts them. Their blades clash once more, with Bosko inadvertently breaking his opponent's blade while denting his own. The man buys a new sword from a trader and sharpens it with the trader's long beard, while Bosko sharpens his sword with a pencil sharpener. The man uses his sword as an arrow, piercing a woman's dress and revealing chicken and chicks under it to her embarrassment. As they approach a fireplace, Bosko flings coal into the man's pants, causing him to escape. In reality, Honey finds Bosko's words to be unbelievable.
