= Nollaí =

2025 short animated Christmas film

Nollaí / Nolig
- Animation by: TAUNT studios
- Release date: 14 December 2025
- Running time: 25 minutes
- Countries: Ireland, Wales
- Languages: Irish, Welsh

Nollaí (Welsh: Nolig) is a short Irish and Welsh animated Christmas film. Nollaig ("Nollaí" for short) is just an ordinary reindeer. Maybe he is a bit taller than the other reindeer but he has always been told he is just big-boned. Nollaí has a great life on the farm with his human family, until he finds out that there is a chance he is actually an Irish elk. This sends Nollaí on an adventure of discovery to find out about his origins.

This is the first animated Christmas film ever to have been jointly commissioned by TG4, BBC NI, and S4C. It is a result of cultural collaboration between Ireland and Wales. Nollaí was first released on the same day by Cúla4, TG4, BBC 2 NI and S4C.
