= Buddy the Gob =

1934 film by Isadore Freleng

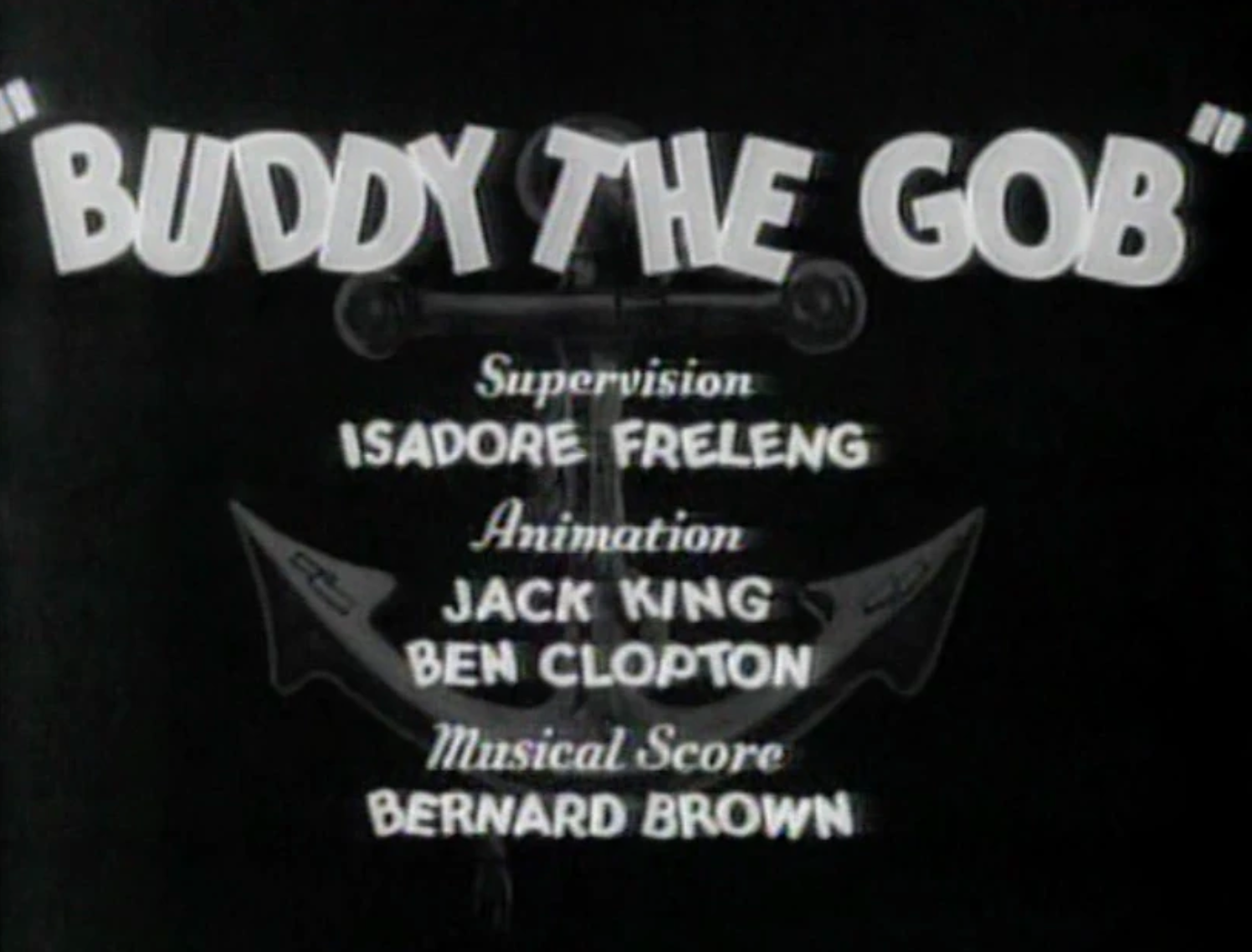
- Title card
- Directed by: Isadore Freleng
- Produced by: Leon Schlesinger
- Starring: Bernard Brown; Charlie Lung
- Music by: Norman Spencer
- Animation by: Jack King; Ben Clopton
- Color process: Black-and-white
- Production company: Leon Schlesinger Productions
- Distributed by: Warner Bros. Pictures; The Vitaphone Corporation
- Release date: January 5, 1934
- Running time: 7 minutes
- Country: United States
- Language: English

Buddy the Gob is a 1934 American animated comedy short film directed by Isadore Freleng. The short was released on January 5, 1934. It is the 42nd film in the Looney Tunes series and the fourth cartoon to feature Buddy, as well as the first in which Freleng is credited as director.

== Plot ==
Numerous Navy warships travel to China. Buddy the sailor washes clothes and jumps off when they arrive. A large woman carries her four children by their queues. Buddy finds a man physically enlarging himself to read a poster written in Chinese; having known Chinese, he reads it and finds out that it is the 150th birthday of the Sacred Dragon, meaning one girl will be offered as a human sacrifice.

Buddy then leaps into the crowd, where a marching band passes with a pianist and numerous masked dancers, including a caricature of Jimmy Durante, and finally the young girl designated for the sacrifice. Appalled, Buddy decides to save her, but is knocked backwards by the door, and is then launched outward with a spear by a guard. He uses the spear to launch himself forward, then fires a fence piece like a bow and arrow to form steps which allow him to sneak up. The girl is locked in place near the caged dragon. Buddy finds her, acquiring the key by baiting a guard with door knocks then incapacitating him with a barrel. They jump down to a rickshaw after Buddy is burnt by the dragon's flame.

The duo escape on the rickshaw with a driver while the crowd is angered by their escape. They trip on boulders, with the driver eventually tripping and leading to the duo landing on him instead. They reach a rope bridge and sever one end, managing to escape to the other end before it collapses entirely. They mock the angry crowd, while the guard from earlier throws a spear, which somehow decides to reverse its direction and hit Buddy again on the buttocks.
