= Felix Finds Out =

1924 film

- Directed by: Otto Messmer
- Produced by: M.J. Winkler
- Animation by: Otto Messmer; Bill Nolan
- Color process: Black and white
- Production company: Pat Sullivan Studios
- Distributed by: M.J. Winkler Productions
- Release date: April 1, 1924
- Running time: 9:04
- Country: United States
- Language: English

Felix Finds Out is a 1924 American silent animated short film distributed by M.J. Winkler Productions, and among the many theatrical cartoons featuring Felix the Cat.

== Premise ==
Willie Jones served as Felix's owner and companion and was the first supporting character of the film series. For several shorts, the boy and the cat played together. In this cartoon, Willie makes his final appearance.

Although Willie retired after this short, a boy resembling him appears in the 1925 Krazy Kat short Searching For Santa!.

== Plot ==
Felix invites Willie to play basketball, but the boy is too busy studying for school. Immediately, Felix tells his friend about buying hotdogs at a nearby stand and Willie accompanies him. Willie becomes worried about not having the time to read books but Felix insures everything will be okay.

At school, the teacher calls Willie to come in front and answer questions on the board. While he ponders, Felix, standing on a window sill at the back of the classroom, whispers to him. Because of this, Willie is able to answer, thanks to Felix making numbers using his tail.

One evening, Willie is at home reading. His assignment is a question on what makes the moon shine. Because Willie has no idea, Felix decides to assist once again. The cat then walks out the door to look for answers.

In the cold dark outdoors, Felix seeks clues. As he leans on a tree stump, thinking what to do next, the stump suddenly moves and walks away. Intrigued by this, Felix follows. The stump is actually a disguised man who comes to a distillery to order a bottle of moonshine. Upon noticing the word "moonshine" on the store's exterior, Felix figures he could find the answer to Willie's assignment. He orders a bottle and becomes intoxicated, even experiencing hallucinations.

Felix heads back home blissful but clumsy and has forgotten what he went outside for. Willie is happy to see him return and asks if he found out what makes the moon shine. The drunken cat tells Willie that he is the cause of the moon's glow. Willie is most surprised and confused.

== See also ==
- Felix the Cat filmography
