= Weary Willies =

1929 film by Isadore Freleng

- Title card
- Directed by: Isadore Freleng
- Produced by: George Winkler
- Music by: Bert Fiske
- Color process: Black and white
- Production company: Winkler Pictures
- Distributed by: Universal Pictures
- Release date: July 22, 1929
- Running time: 8 min
- Country: United States
- Language: English

Weary Willies is a 1929 American animated short film directed by Isadore Freleng. It stars Oswald the Lucky Rabbit.

== Plot summary ==
The Cartoon

Oswald is a penniless vagabond who comes out of one of the train cars after it makes a stop. As he steps out of the train, Oswald sees a guard passing by. Therefore, he hurries back inside and shuts the door, but because Oswald's baggage (a sack tied to a stick) is left outside, the suspicious guard decides to inspect the train. When the guard opens the door and peeps in, Oswald, coming out from another exit, kicks the officer in and makes a run for it.

Wondering on the countryside, the hungry Oswald sees Pete camping under a tree. The two meet and befriend each other. They then start to fry an egg using the camp fire and other limited equipment that they have. While Ozzie and Pete couldn't agree on how they should have the fried egg, a squirrel pops out from the tree and snatches it from them.

The two uneasy friends are left wondering what they should do next. Suddenly, they see roasted chicken on a window sill of a nearby house. Pete tells Oswald to filch it. Oswald is initially reluctant but ultimately agrees after getting strangled by the bear. The rabbit enters the house's yard and approaches the window, only to be chased out of the gate by the resident dog.

Oswald comes up with another idea when he notices the clothesline connects between the gate and the window. The plan works and Oswald gets his hands on the roasted chicken. Upon exiting the gate, he is spotted by a patrolling cop, prompting him to leave quickly. Passing by his friend, Oswald tosses the food to Pete who catches it. The rabbit figures he'd rather run to somewhere than to be tormented by the cop.

When Pete is about to take a bite of the roasted chicken, the cop, approaching from behind, swipes it in the blink of an eye. The surprised bear then looks around and notices the cop pointing a gun at him. He too flees. As they walk away together, Oswald and Pete point fingers at each other over not having to eat anything. Meanwhile, the cop carries the roasted chicken and puts it back on the window sill. Just then, the dog, watching from one of the house's corners, thinks another act of pilferage is taking place. In this, the dog chases the cop down the road, passing by Oswald and Pete who are enjoying the incident.

== See also ==
- Oswald the Lucky Rabbit filmography
