= Violet and Marlowe Rob A Bank =

2026 animated short film by Wesley Wang

Violet and Marlowe Rob a Bank
- Directed by: Wesley Wang
- Written by: Wesley Wang
- Produced by: Wesley Wang
- Music by: "Feel It All Again" by adore
- Animation by: Jacob Rivera
- Release date: June 6, 2026 (Tribeca Festival)
- Running time: 2 minutes
- Country: United States
- Language: English

Violet and Marlowe Rob a Bank is a 2026 American computer-animated short film and music video written, directed, and produced by filmmaker Wesley Wang. The film follows a married pair of rabbits who conduct a series of heists after a ruler known as President Rabbit monopolizes the world's supply of carrots.

The film is set to "Feel It All Again", a song by the pop band adore. It had its world premiere at the 2026 Tribeca Festival, where it won the award for Best Animated Short.

== Plot ==
President Rabbit establishes control over the world's carrot supply, depriving rural communities of their food and resources. Violet and Marlowe, a husband-and-wife rabbit couple living in the countryside, begin carrying out heists to recover the carrots. Their actions develop into a violent struggle against President Rabbit and the system supporting his monopoly.

== Production ==
Violet and Marlowe Rob a Bank was the first project produced by Wang's company, Wesley Wang Media. The film was created using the open-source three-dimensional graphics software Blender and had a reported production budget of $20,000.

Jacob Rivera served as the film's animator, while Alex Salsberg was its storyboard artist. Andrés Marthe worked as sound designer, and Tristan Baylis served as supervising sound editor and re-recording mixer.

The film was conceived as a collaboration with adore and uses the band's song "Feel It All Again" throughout its running time. After the band signed with Warner Music, the company agreed to help finance and market the project. The film functions both as a self-contained narrative short and as the official music video for the song.

== Release ==
The film received its world premiere in the animated-short-film program at the 2026 Tribeca Festival. The program was curated by Whoopi Goldberg.

It was subsequently released online in June 2026 through Wang's YouTube channel and other social-media platforms. Animation World Network reported that the film received more than 10 million views across platforms during the first 24 hours following its online release.

== Reception ==
At the Tribeca Festival, Violet and Marlowe Rob a Bank won Best Animated Short. The festival jury praised the film for telling a complete and emotionally affecting story within its brief running time and with very little dialogue.

Animation publications subsequently highlighted the film's independent production model, three-dimensional animation, and rapid online popularity.

== Possible expansion ==
Before the film's release, Wang said that its performance online would be used to assess interest in expanding the story into a feature film or scripted series. He estimated that a feature using a similar production method could potentially be made for approximately $1 million, although no completed feature adaptation had been announced at the time.
