= Bosko's Knight-Mare =

1933 film by Hugh Harman

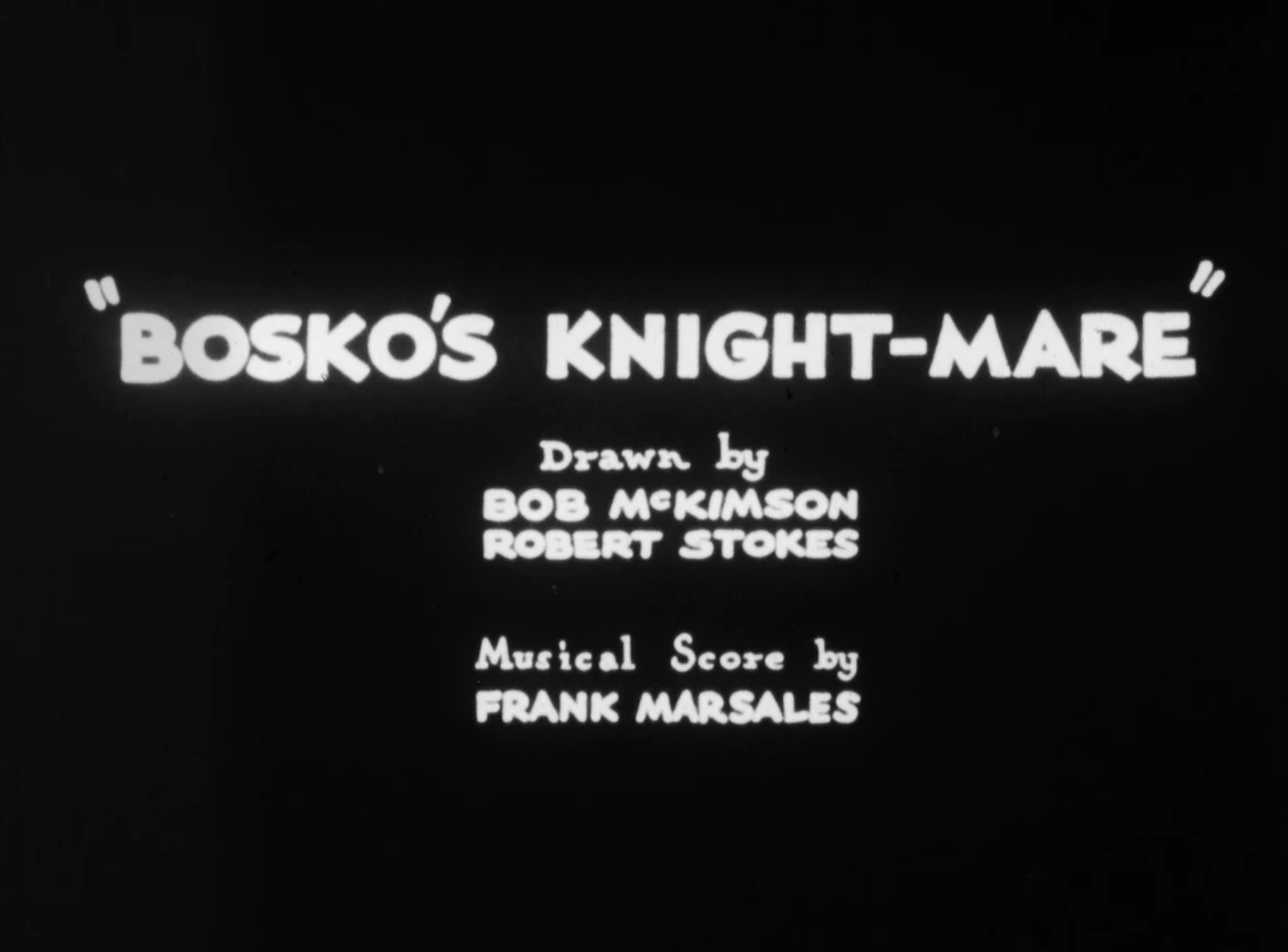
- Title card
- Directed by: Hugh Harman
- Produced by: Hugh Harman; Rudolf Ising; Leon Schlesinger
- Music by: Frank Marsales
- Animation by: Bob McKimson; Robert Stokes
- Color process: Black-and-white
- Production companies: Harman-Ising Productions; Leon Schlesinger Productions
- Distributed by: Warner Bros. Pictures; The Vitaphone Corporation
- Release date: June 8, 1933
- Running time: 7 minutes
- Country: United States
- Language: English

Bosko's Knight-Mare is a 1933 American animated comedy short film directed by Hugh Harman. It is the 33rd film in the Looney Tunes series featuring Bosko. It was released on June 8, 1933.

== Plot ==
Bosko reads about King Arthur's Knights of the Round Table in his study while Bruno tries to sleep. He adjusts the radio to play Herman Hupfeld's "Let's Put Out the Lights (and Go to Sleep)", which does cause him drift off to sleep.

Bosko dreams that he is one of the knights, entering a castle through the moat. He drinks alongside the other knights, who are caricatures of the Marx Brothers, Ed Wynn, Jimmy Durante, Laurel and Hardy, and Mahatma Gandhi. A villainous Black Knight pursues Honey and attempts to abduct her in the tower she is at, motivating Bosko to give chase. He arrives earlier than the Black Knight but is subdued as the Black Knight falls onto his horse with Honey, leaving a crater. Bosko jumps into a lake and literally becomes a submarine to give chase, as the Black Knight returns to his lair and Bosko enters. He uses a machine gun to shoot the Black Knight, only to be thrown across the lair and incapacitated. Honey's attempt to revive him turns out to be Bruno licking him awake, as he chops up a suit of armor out of instinct, then jumps back into a bed which flattens him.
