= Great Guns! =

1927 film by Walt Disney

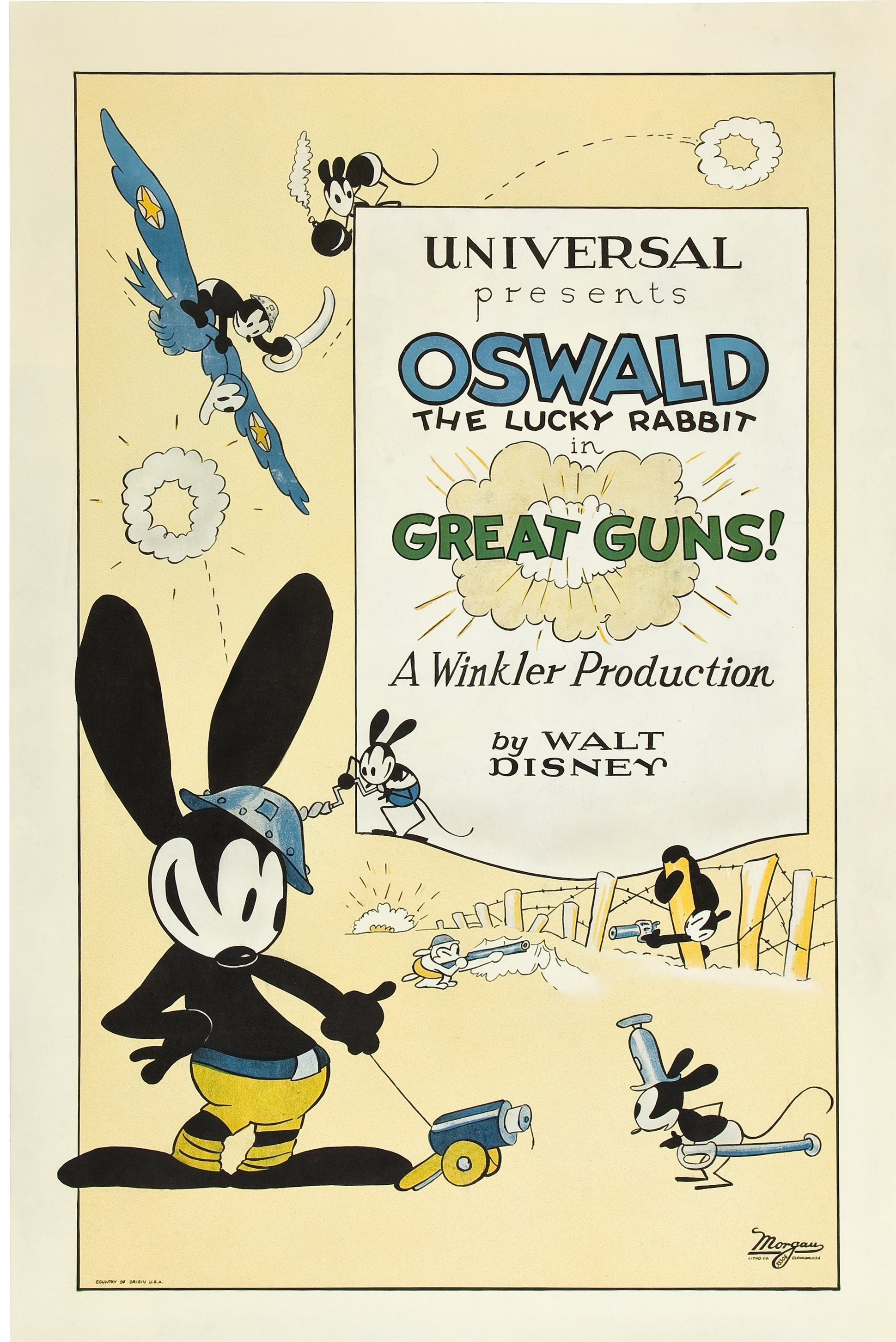
- Theatrical release poster
- Directed by: Walt Disney
- Produced by: Charles Mintz; George Winkler
- Animation by: Ub Iwerks others
- Color process: Black-and-white
- Production company: Winkler Pictures
- Distributed by: Universal Pictures
- Release date: October 17, 1927
- Running time: 6:43
- Country: United States
- Language: English

Great Guns! is a 1927 animated comedy short film directed by Walt Disney and produced by Winkler Pictures. It is the fourth film featuring Oswald the Lucky Rabbit. It was re-issued by Universal Pictures in 1932. It was originally released on October 17, 1927. Great Guns! is a parody of war films, a popular film genre during the silent era.

== Plot ==
The short film

War is declared and Oswald enlists in the army. He shows off his uniform and weapon to impress his girlfriend. Later he is shown in a trench in a battlefield kissing her photo. A mouse piloting an airplane drops a bomb, destroying the photo. Angered, Oswald boards a plane and engages in a dogfight with the mouse's plane. Both planes crash and they begin hand-to-hand fighting. A large enemy bear named Pete approaches, causing Oswald to attempt to flee. He encounters an elephant and uses the elephant's trunk to fire cannonballs at Pete. Pete fires cannonballs back at Oswald from a cannon. Oswald catches most of the balls and throws them back, but one hits Oswald, reducing him to dust. His girlfriend, now a Red Cross nurse, appears and gathers the pieces in a basket and takes them to a hospital. She pours them into a cocktail shaker and after shaking them, pours them out and restores Oswald. They joyously embrace and kiss each other.

== Home media ==
After The Walt Disney Company acquired the film's rights from Universal Pictures in 2005, the film was released on home media on December 11, 2007, on Walt Disney Treasures: The Adventures of Oswald the Lucky Rabbit.

== Legacy ==
In the Disney video game Epic Mickey, where Disney shorts starring Mickey Mouse and Oswald the Lucky Rabbit are used for navigation, Great Guns! is one of the shorts that can be played through.
