= Alpine Antics (1929 film) =

1929 film by Tom Palmer

- Title card
- Directed by: Tom Palmer
- Produced by: George Winkler
- Music by: Bert Fiske
- Color process: Black-and-white
- Production company: Winkler Pictures
- Distributed by: Universal Pictures
- Release date: April 1, 1929
- Running time: 7:51
- Country: United States
- Language: English

Alpine Antics is a 1929 American animated short film directed by Tom Palmer. It features Oswald the Lucky Rabbit.

== Plot ==
The short (silent version)

One day at the Swiss Alps, Oswald is milking a goat which runs away upon being called by another one passing by. As Oswald's goat jumps out of the scene, the bucket used is kicked off and ends up on the rabbit's head. Oswald struggles to remove the pail but is able to get it off on time when he stumbles. Just then, his faithful St. Bernard dog comes to him, carrying a message. The message is a distress note from the girl cat named Fanny seeking Oswald's help.

Oswald and the dog move forth and head upland. Obstacles on the way include large rocks and a canyon, both of which they get through with little trouble. After a few more paces, they find the girl cat up a cliff and hanging onto a branch. To reach her, they stick a ladder on top of a boulder. Oswald climbs up and collects the feline. It turns out momentarily that the boulder is in fact a wolverine which wakes up and isn't happy to see them. Frightened by this, the dog runs off, carrying the ladder with Oswald and the girl cat still on it.

Keeping away from the fierce predator, the three friends run into a cave. When they reach the entrance, they find themselves on an edge thousands of feet above water. They then move further from the exit and around the mount to hide themselves. The wolverine also enters the cave but is unaware of what lies ahead, and therefore picks up speed. As a consequence, the wolverine overshoots off the edge and plunges into the sea. Oswald and the girl cat ride the dog on their way back.

== See also ==
- Oswald the Lucky Rabbit filmography
