= Ben Clopton =

American artist (1906–1987)

Benjamin Ashby Clopton Jr. (July 27, 1906 – November 19, 1987) was an American artist best known for his work on Walt Disney and Harman-Ising animated cartoons.

Clopton was the fourth child of Benjamin Ashby and Hannah Olivia (Eklund) Clopton. His parents married in 1897 in the Gallatin Valley of Montana and settled between Deep Creek and Grayson, near Townsend, Montana, in 1910, where the family owned a ranch and raised dryland wheat. He attended the University of Missoula in the mid-1920s.

Clopton left for California in January 1927 for what was supposed to be a few months. Instead, he was hired by Walt Disney for Winkler Pictures in February and began working under animator Ub Iwerks as an in-betweener. His first cartoon was the Alice Comedy, Alice's Three Bad Eggs. Clopton later worked on the Oswald the Lucky Rabbit series, directing six films after producer Charles Mintz persuaded him to leave Disney.

After Winkler's contract with Universal was revoked, Clopton took a job with Iwerks' studio, Animated Pictures Corp., until 1933, when Leon Schlesinger refused to renew Hugh Harman and Rudolf Ising's contract, started his own studio, and hired staff. Clopton was among the animators and his first film credit is on Buddy the Gob, released January 13, 1934. Clopton is credited on sixteen Schlesinger cartoons through 1936, when he left for Walter Lantz Productions. Clopton's name is on three cartoons released in 1937. His name appears for a final time on screen as an animator on Gulliver's Travels, released in 1939 by the Fleischer Studios.

Clopton returned to California and worked at Disney with his brother John before they were inducted into the United States Army in April 1942. He was divorced in 1945 by his wife Sylvia Lamarr, stand-in for Hedy Lamarr and Joan Crawford. A wire service report made no mention of his animation career, instead stating he was a rancher. She testified at her divorce trial "He kept a loaded rifle around the house. He used to shoot holes in the ceiling. It made me very nervous".

He was living in Santa Monica, California, at the time of his mother's death in 1966 but re-settled back home in Townsend, Montana, where he died in 1987.
