= It's Got Me Again! =

1932 film

- Title card
- Directed by: Rudolf Ising
- Produced by: Hugh Harman; Rudolf Ising; Leon Schlesinger
- Starring: Johnny Murray; The Rhythmettes (uncredited)
- Music by: Frank Marsales
- Animation by: Isadore Freleng; Thomas McKimson
- Color process: Black and white
- Production companies: Harman-Ising Productions; Leon Schlesinger Productions
- Distributed by: Warner Bros. Pictures; The Vitaphone Corporation
- Release date: May 14, 1932
- Running time: 7 min (one reel)
- Country: United States
- Language: English

It's Got Me Again! is a 1932 American animated comedy short film directed by Rudolf Ising. It is the eleventh film in the Merrie Melodies series. The short was released on May 14, 1932.

It is notable as the first non-Disney cartoon to be nominated for the Academy Award for Best Animated Short Film in 1932. It is also the first Warner Bros. cartoon to be animated by veteran layout artist Thomas McKimson. The title refers to the song "It's Got Me Again!" (music by Bernice Petkere, lyrics by Irving Caesar) which plays during the cartoon.

== Plot ==
The full short.

One night, a mouse crawls out of a mouse hole and attempts to sneak out only to be scared back by a grandfather clock's chimes and gets its tail stuck in a mousetrap. After escaping the trap by returning to the hole, the mouse exits, eats the cheese on the mousetrap and continues trekking onwards. After going through multiple musical instruments, the mouse bounces on a drum and activates a gramophone, which plays the titular song. The mouse invites his friends, which come out of the hole to dance to the music, including one old mouse with a broken leg.

The mice play with the record by running on it, one of which is thrown off the gramophone and returns using a metronome as a catapult. One of the mice launched bounces off of a horn and slides through a flute, creating multiple smaller versions of itself, to its chagrin as it plays the drum. "The Girl I Left Behind" is played, during which a few mice march across the ceiling (with animation reused from Hold Anything), with one off-sync and even falling off of the ceiling and into a spittoon after the song ends. The mice mock the off-sync mouse who retaliates by blowing a raspberry through a trombone, creating a loud noise and stopping the mocking mice. The mouse then waltzes off whistling "The Sailor's Hornpipe", all the while a hungry cat watches on.

The mouse waltzes to a piano where two mice are shown doing a variation of the Apache dance on it. During this, the hungry cat sneaks across the rooftop and watches from above before diving through the chimney. After landing in the fireplace, the cat notices a cuckoo clock before diving towards it and destroying it, which causes the cat to hiccup cuckoo noises. As it sneaks up on the mice, the cuckoo noises alert the mice to the cat's presence, causing all but one mouse to escape. This mouse is chased all around the house, using a mousetrap as a catapult to escape, but is immediately cornered.

As the mouse sings the titular song to beg for mercy, the other mouse launch drumsticks at the cat with a music bow used like a literal bow. This causes the cat to flee as the rest of the mice attack the cat with other instruments-turned-weapons, such as a harp launching more drum sticks, mice using a flamethrower to burn the cat and cause him to be knocked out by a drum, a mouse tickling the cat with a noisemaker, and ending the cat off by firing needles from the gramophone as if a machine gun, resulting in the cat fleeing through the window as the mice cheer.

== Home media ==
It's Got Me Again! is available as an unrestored extra on disc 2 of the Looney Tunes Golden Collection: Volume 3 DVD set and on disc 3 of the Looney Tunes Platinum Collection: Volume 2 Blu-ray set.
