= Yodeling Yokels =

1931 film

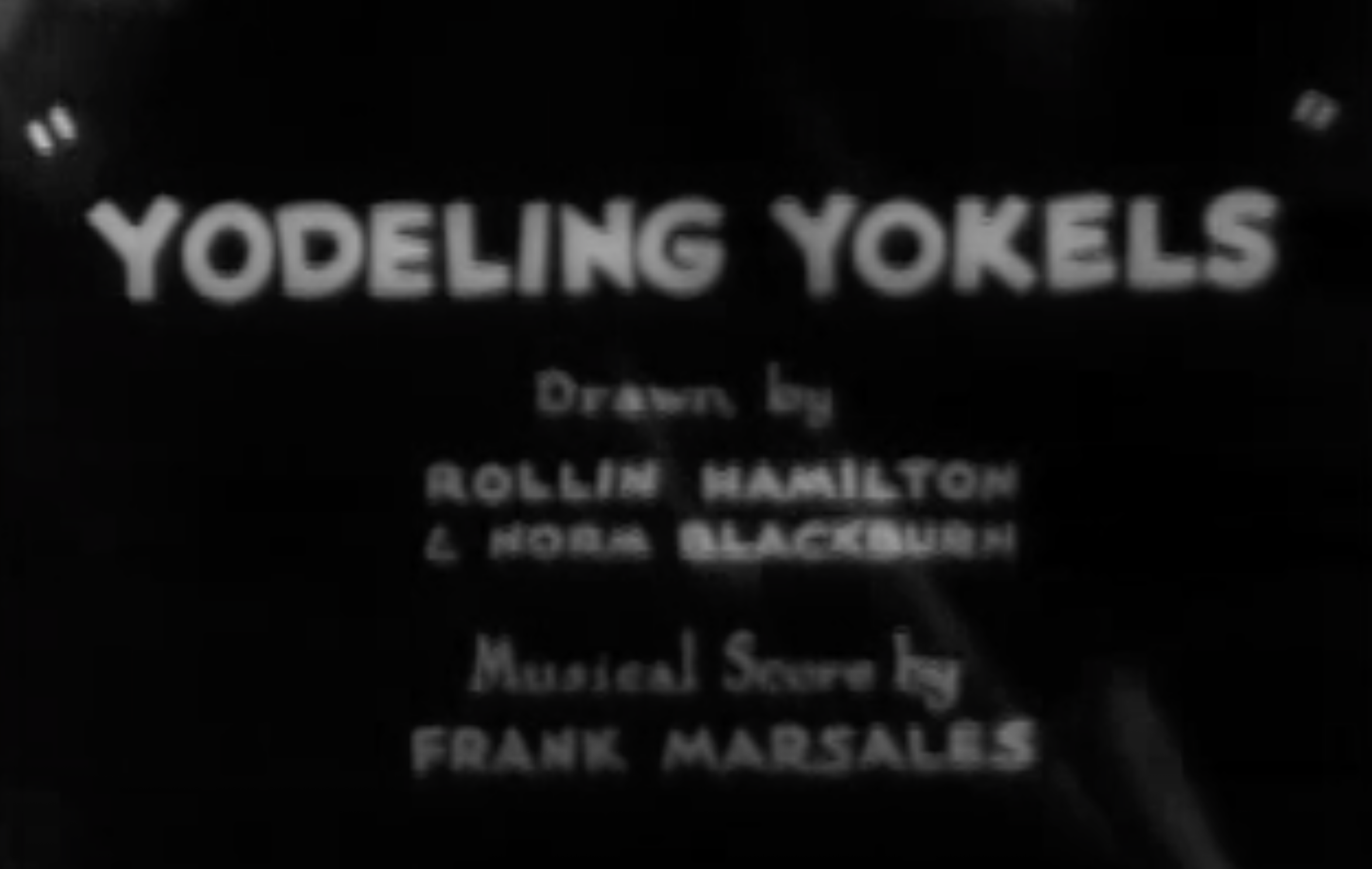
- Title card
- Directed by: Hugh Harman; Rudolf Ising
- Produced by: Hugh Harman; Rudolf Ising
- Starring: Johnny Murray; Rochelle Hudson (both uncredited)
- Music by: Frank Marsales
- Animation by: Rollin Hamilton; Norm Blackburn
- Color process: Black-and-white
- Production company: Harman-Ising Productions
- Distributed by: Warner Bros. Pictures; The Vitaphone Corporation
- Release date: March 21, 1931; (earliest known date)
- Running time: 7:15
- Country: United States
- Language: English

Yodeling Yokels is a 1931 American animated comedy short film. It is the tenth film in the Looney Tunes series featuring Bosko and Honey. It was released as early as March 21, 1931. (Note: Archived from a March 26 article, this is based on the fact that new cartoon shorts would premiere in theaters on Saturdays.) It is directed by Hugh Harman and Rudolf Ising, and the film score was composed by Frank Marsales.

== Plot ==
Full short

Bosko wanders through an alpine landscape to Honey's house while yodeling and playing an accordion. Various animals join in on the music. Bosko meets an owl, who insults him and causes him to drop his accordion into the depths. Angered, Bosko shoots the owl with a revolver and causes it to lose its plumage, making him leave while disgruntled. Honey leaves her house after spotting Bosko to under the cliff Bosko is at. He slides down a tall tree, not realizing its absurd height, hitting numerous branches in painful fashion before landing on skis. He accidentally knocks over Honey, who rolls down a snowy hill while he gives chase. Honey falls onto numerous icebergs in the rapids while Bosko hits a rock. As Honey calls for help, Bosko manages to recruit a dog using the outhouse. Bosko and the dog struggle to balance on the icebergs, using each other's jumps to barely grab on, before the dog resorts to swimming and running on land while Bosko rides it. They arrive on time to see Honey jumping across ice to avoid plummeting into the waterfall, which the dog saves using robotic stretchable teeth. Bosko, Honey and the dog are overjoyed while an unrelated dog joins the commotion.

During the events of the film, a mouse at Honey's house sneaks out of his hole to play mini-golf with a pea on a piece of Swiss cheese, only to be annoyed by his inaccurate shots. He manages to get a shot in and celebrates it at the film's conclusion.
