= The Tree's Knees =

1931 film

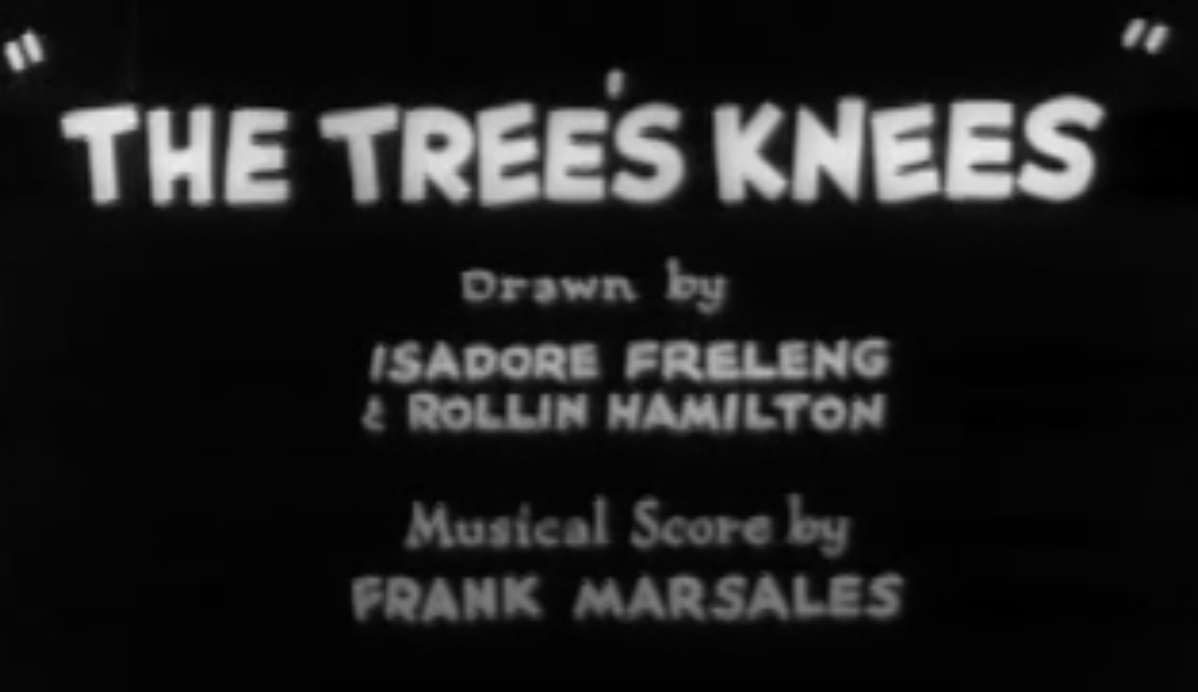
- Title card
- Directed by: Hugh Harman; Rudolf Ising
- Produced by: Hugh Harman; Rudolf Ising; Leon Schlesinger
- Starring: Johnny Murray (uncredited)
- Music by: Frank Marsales
- Animation by: Isadore Freleng; Rollin Hamilton
- Production companies: Harman-Ising Productions; Leon Schlesinger
- Distributed by: Warner Bros. Pictures; The Vitaphone Corporation
- Release date: May 16, 1931; (earliest known date)
- Running time: 7:02
- Country: United States
- Language: English

The Tree's Knees is a 1931 American animated comedy short film. It is the twelfth film in the Looney Tunes series featuring Bosko. It was released as early as May 16, 1931. (Note: Archived from a May 19 article, this is based on the fact that new cartoon shorts would premiere in theaters on Saturdays.) It was the last cartoon in the series to be directed by both Hugh Harman and Rudolf Ising, and the first to be produced by Leon Schlesinger beyond an associate producer credit. Every Looney Tunes cartoon after this was directed by Hugh Harman until 1933, and every Merrie Melodies cartoon was directed by Rudolf Ising until the aforementioned year. The short reuses animation Ain't Nature Grand!. The film score was composed by Frank Marsales.

== Plot ==
Full short

Bosko goes to the forest to chop firewood. He spots a particularly large tree and attempts to chop it, causing it to recoil in fear. A squirrel who lives in the tree pleads with him to spare it while its offspring huddle around it as protection. Bosko instead plays the harmonica, which the trees enjoy while riding their parent like a carousel. One of the trees insult Bosko while he walks away, only to be chased and has his bark removed. Bosko begrudgingly returns the bark, which the tree retaliates by kicking him in the groin. He pursues another tree, finding one assisting a mother bird in soothing her offspring to sleep, only to be hit by a bird's spit from another tree. Bosko is distracted by a butterfly, who leads him to a series of thin trees that he uses as a harp. Nearby trees and animals join in on the sorrowful melody. Two nearby mice play with a saw, only for one to fall into a pond nearby; the other mouse saves it from drowning and they saw a piece of wood from a nearby log, turning into a makeshift phonograph, playing a joyous melody that improves the trees' emotions and Bosko's mood.
