= Ain't Nature Grand! =

1931 film

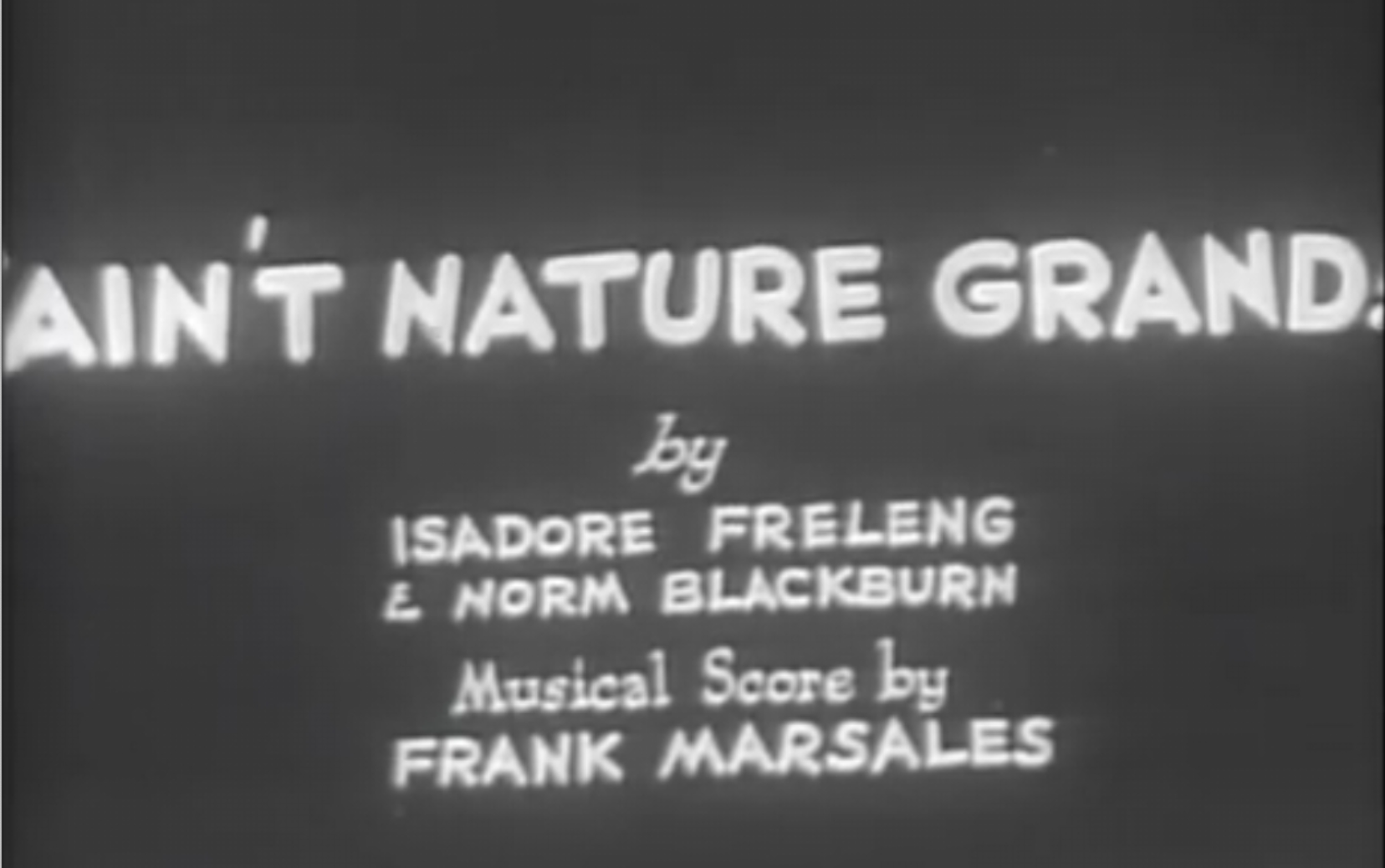
- Title card
- Directed by: Hugh Harman; Rudolf Ising
- Produced by: Hugh Harman; Rudolf Ising
- Starring: Johnny Murray (uncredited)
- Music by: Frank Marsales
- Animation by: Isadore Freleng; Norm Blackburn
- Color process: Black-and-white
- Production company: Harman-Ising Productions
- Distributed by: Warner Bros. Pictures; The Vitaphone Corporation
- Release date: December 13, 1930; (earliest known date)
- Running time: 7:00
- Country: United States
- Language: English

Ain't Nature Grand! is a 1930 American animated comedy short film. It is the seventh film in the Looney Tunes series featuring Bosko. It was directed by Hugh Harman and Rudolf Ising. It was released as early as December 13, 1930.

== Plot ==
Full short

A river's reflection shows Bosko going fishing while his dog Bruno follows, his first appearance outside of the series' title cards. Bosko forces Bruno to leave and spits into the river. He arrives at a sign that prohibits fishing, which he promptly disregards. He allows a worm to go free after it pleads for help upon realizing its fate, while inexplicably using the words "no" on the sign as replacement bait. A bird attempts to catch the worm, who then humiliates it by leading it into four holes and tricking it into diving into one, pulling its plumage out as it walks away disgruntled. Bosko finally finds a fish after waiting for a long time, toying with it after it attempts to flee. The fish is angered by Bosko's treatment and spits at him before leaving.

Bosko then spots a butterfly and follows it as he attempts to catch it. He loses sight of the butterfly and finds two bees and a spider making music near a waterfall. He frolics around the waterfall before singing and dancing with frogs while a spider is played like a carousel by its offspring. Annoyed by Bosko's antics, the bees convince a dragonfly to act as a makeshift airplane as they drop a rock onto Bosko's head before chasing him and shooting him with bees. Bosko hides in a fountain while the insects leave, celebrating his luck as the film ends.
