= McKimson =

McKimson is a Scottish surname. Notable people with the surname include:

- Charles McKimson (1914–1999), American animator, brother of Thomas and Robert
- Robert McKimson (1910–1977), American animator and illustrator
- Thomas McKimson (1907–1998), American animator
