= Box Car Blues =

1930 film by Hugh Harman

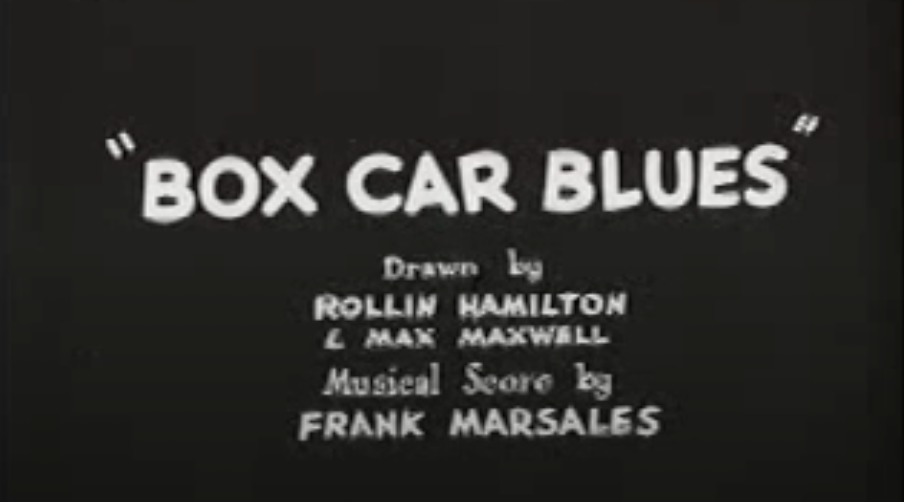
- Title card
- Directed by: Hugh Harman; Rudolf Ising
- Produced by: Hugh Harman; Rudolf Ising
- Starring: Bernard B. Brown (uncredited)
- Music by: Frank Marsales
- Animation by: Rollin Hamilton; Max Maxwell
- Color process: Black-and-white
- Production company: Harman-Ising Productions
- Distributed by: Warner Bros. Pictures; The Vitaphone Corporation
- Release date: October 18, 1930; (earliest known date)
- Running time: 6:45
- Country: United States
- Language: English

Box Car Blues is a 1930 American animated comedy short film directed by Hugh Harman and Rudolf Ising. It is the fifth film in the Looney Tunes series featuring Bosko. It was released as early as October 18, 1930. (Note: Archived from an October 24 article, this is based on the fact that new cartoon shorts would premiere in theaters on Saturdays.)

== Plot ==
Full short

Bosko sings and dances with a banjo playing pig in the furthest boxcar of a train. They are quite jolly until Bosko starts a mournful rendition of Crying for the Carolines, at which the pig starts to cry. The train proceeds to go up an absurdly steep anthropomorphic mountain, knocking the pig out cold as they lose balance. The train reveals the mountain's buttocks, whose furious reaction of obscuring the area enables the train to climb to its peak and continue its journey. The boxcar with Bosko and the pig in it is left behind, leaving Bosko temporarily decapitated as he calls for help. The train passes through a dark tunnel and is repeatedly sliced open as it passes through tracks varying in width. He is knocked onto the top of tunnels, rolling into a running cow chased by the boxcar and eventually on the boxcar itself. Holding onto the boxcar, he slides down a steep slope while being hit by multiple obstacles. The boxcar eventually rams into a tree, flattening the cow while the boxcar's parts rain from the sky. The pig wakes up and shields himself and Bosko with an umbrella, only to be hit by his banjo in particularly painful fashion. Bosko comforts him and plays the banjo as they restart their journey as if nothing ever happened.
