= Ups 'n Downs =

1931 film

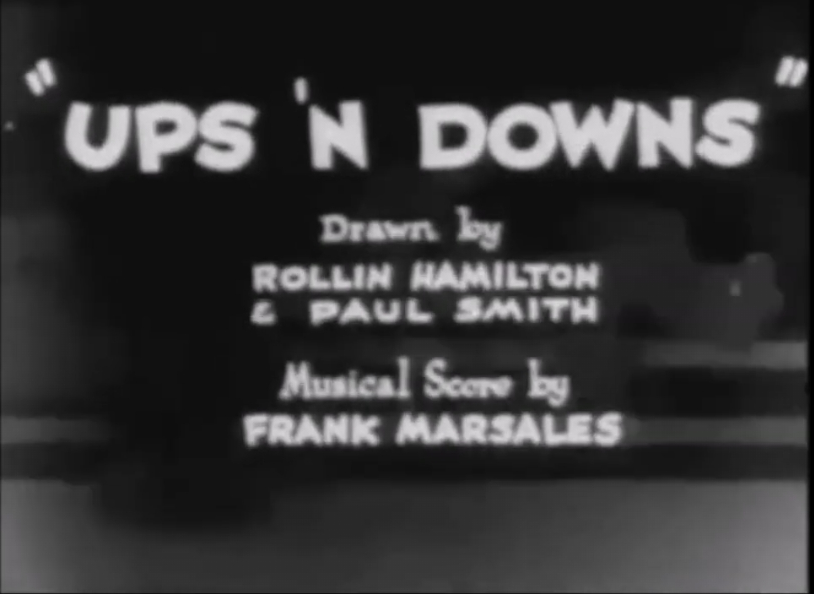
- Title card
- Directed by: Hugh Harman; Rudolf Ising
- Produced by: Hugh Harman; Rudolf Ising
- Starring: Johnny Murray (uncredited)
- Music by: Frank Marsales
- Animation by: Rollin Hamilton; Paul J. Smith
- Color process: Black-and-white
- Production company: Harman-Ising Productions
- Distributed by: Warner Bros. Pictures; The Vitaphone Corporation
- Release date: January 31, 1931; (earliest known date)
- Running time: 6:50
- Country: United States
- Language: English

Ups N' Downs is a 1931 American animated comedy short film. It is the eighth film in the Looney Tunes series featuring Bosko. It was released as early as January 31, 1931. It is directed by Hugh Harman and Rudolf Ising, while the film score was written by Frank Marsales.

== Plot ==
Full short

Bosko is working as a hot dog salesman at a fair. A horse race is being held and advertised by a cow ridden by numerous small animals and a dachshund ridden by its puppies. An old dog buys a hot dog, who pleads with him for survival and strikes up a friendship with him. Some mice attempt to enter the race without paying a fare by being launched by an ostrich.

The competitors, including one owned by a showman, train their horses. Bosko realizes the race is starting, rushing to a shed to unleash his self-built robot horse, which breaks down upon exit; Bosko manages to fix him and arrive at the nick of time. The horse is mocked for its diminutive size before the race starts. Bosko starts later, only to surpass most racers through its superior speed. The showman attempts to sabotage Bosko by spitting tobacco, which succeeds until Bosko catches up while carrying the horse. The showman throws a grenade, which explodes under the horse, but the horse promptly rebuilds itself as the parts fall to the ground. At the final stretch, the horse stretches its head with a spring, speeding Bosko up enough to win the race.

=== Alternate version and ending ===
When the cartoon was re-released by pirate distributor Astra TV in the 1950s, it was renamed Off to the Races. Since it was sourced from an incomplete copy, the cartoon abruptly ends with the hand grenade going off, and cutting to a "THE END" title card. The 1973 redrawn colorized version, produced in South Korea, was also sourced from the same incomplete copy, and thus has a significantly different ending produced; the hand grenade destroys Bosko's mechanical horse, but also sends him flying into the cheating jockey and knocks him off his own horse, which Bosko is then able to use to win the race.
