= Bosko the Doughboy =

1931 film

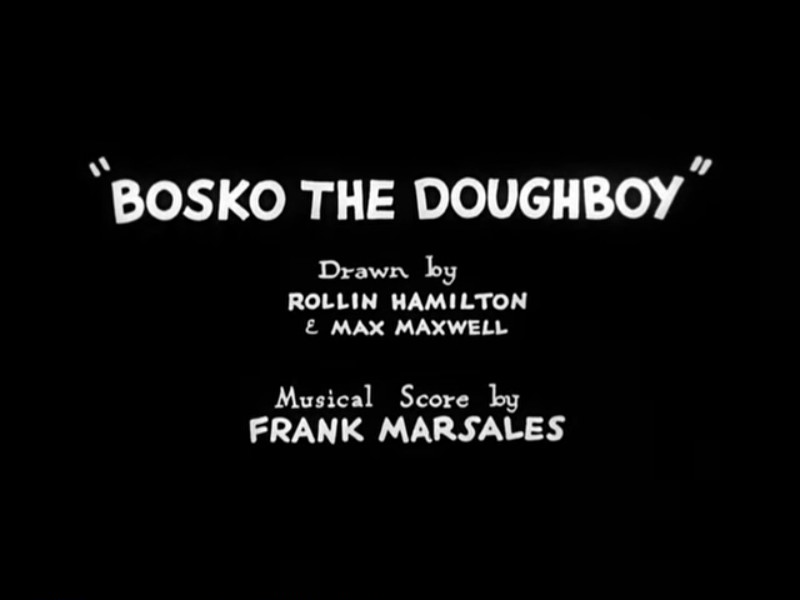
- Title card
- Directed by: Hugh Harman
- Produced by: Hugh Harman; Rudolf Ising; Leon Schlesinger
- Starring: Johnny Murray; Rudolf Ising (both uncredited)
- Music by: Frank Marsales
- Animation by: Rollin Hamilton; Max Maxwell
- Production companies: Harman-Ising Productions; Leon Schlesinger Productions
- Distributed by: Warner Bros. Pictures; The Vitaphone Corporation
- Release date: October 10, 1931; (earliest known date)
- Running time: 6:58
- Country: United States
- Language: English

Bosko the Doughboy is a 1931 American animated comedy short film. It is the fourteenth film in the Looney Tunes series featuring Bosko. It was released as early as October 10, 1931. (Note: Archived from an October 11 article, this is based on the fact that new cartoon shorts would premiere in theaters on Saturdays. It likely premiered on October 3, since the next cartoon (Bosko's Soda Fountain) would've premiered on October 10.) It was directed by Hugh Harman, and the film score was composed by Frank Marsales.

== Plot ==
The full short

It is World War I, where animals are engaging in warfare. On the losing side, Bosko is a doughboy eating a large pan of peas, only for it to be destroyed by artillery. He settles for a piece of cheese on a mousetrap and sits depressed in the trenches. He pulls out a comically large picture of Honey to bolster his self confidence, only for it to be destroyed by gunfire again. This motivates him to fight before being shot down and narrowly evading death.

A cow soldier cheers Bosko up by playing the harmonica as they play music on the floor tiles. A dachshund soldier is woken up by a flea who heard the duo's music. As the dachshund suffers from the fleas' presence in his fur, Bosko lets enemy soldiers shoot the dachshund's helmet, which turns out to be useful in removing fleas.

The animals go to battle once again with loads of casualties. Bosko is bombed by an enemy soldier on a pelican before he can pass through the trenches. As a last resort, he makes the dachshund swallow a spare bomb and send it upwards, which successfully knocks the pelican off the air as it falls to its death. The dachshund is then shot and reduced to a diminutive size, running and hiding for its life. Bosko runs through gunfire to a hippo soldier, who covers for him only to swallow a bomb. The hippo accepts his inevitable death while Bosko uses a leftover suit with a mind of its own to deflect a bomb and destroy a cannon, arriving to save him by unzipping his body like a bodysuit. Bosko is bombed while celebrating, his body full of soot from the explosion.

== Home media ==
Bosko the Doughboy is available on disc 2 of the Looney Tunes Golden Collection: Volume 6 DVD set.
