= Beau Bosko =

1933 film by Hugh Harman and Isadore Freleng

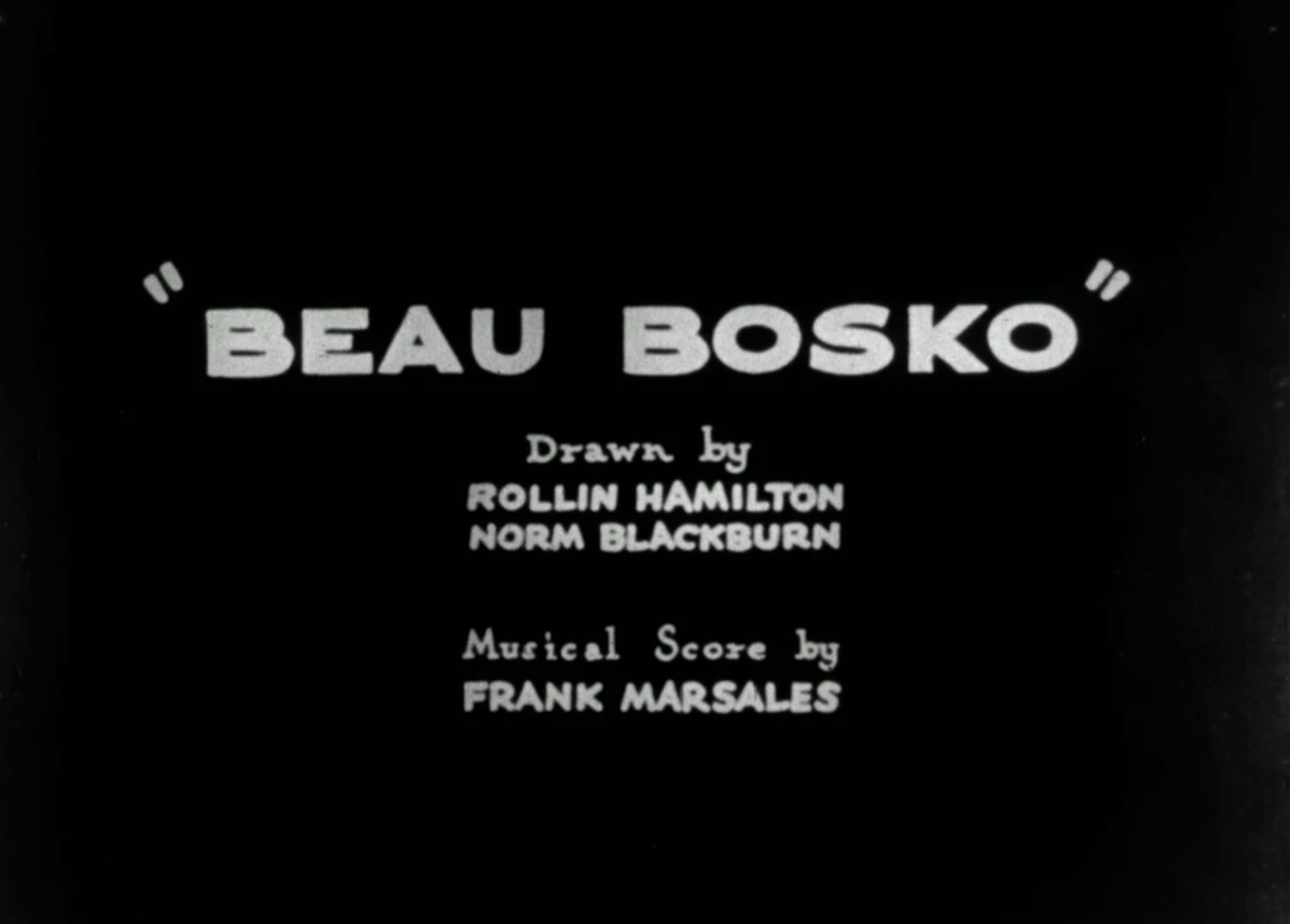
- Title card
- Directed by: Hugh Harman; Isadore Freleng
- Produced by: Hugh Harman; Rudolf Ising; Leon Schlesinger
- Music by: Frank Marsales
- Animation by: Rollin Hamilton; Norm Blackburn
- Color process: Black-and-white
- Production companies: Harman-Ising Productions; Leon Schlesinger Productions
- Distributed by: Warner Bros. Pictures; The Vitaphone Corporation
- Release date: June 23, 1933
- Running time: 7 min
- Country: United States
- Language: English

Beau Bosko is a 1933 American animated comedy short film directed by Hugh Harman and Isadore Freleng. It is the 35th film in the Looney Tunes series featuring Bosko. It was released on June 23, 1933.

== Plot ==
In North Africa, it is morning for the French Foreign Legion. A corporal wakes the legionnaires, only to be jumped while they dress up. Bosko is still asleep to the chagrin of his uniform, who wakes him by having him blow into a trumpet. Bosko exploits a legionnaire's gear to wash his face.

Bosko reports for duty and unknowingly signs up to a plan to capture the notorious criminal Ali Oop. He rides a camel through long distances to a city. He finds Honey and kiss together, only to find Ali Oop and his subordinates terrorizing the city. As they both run to hide, Ali Oop throws a plethora of knives in their direction, which they exploit to enter a building. As the criminals shoot him with a variety of nonsensically constructed shotgun, Bosko finds a revolver and shoots pots and coconuts to subdue them. Bosko then throws spears which conveniently lock Ali Oop in place after he lands on a wheelbarrow, which he victoriously wheels away with Honey and the camel in tow.
