= Congo Jazz =

1930 film

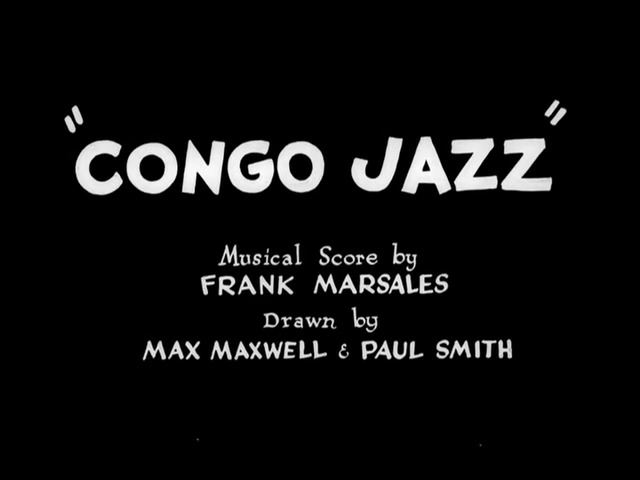
- Title card
- Directed by: Hugh Harman; Rudolf Ising
- Produced by: Hugh Harman; Rudolf Ising
- Starring: Bernard B. Brown (uncredited)
- Music by: Frank Marsales
- Animation by: Max Maxwell; Paul Smith
- Color process: Black-and-white
- Production company: Harman-Ising Productions
- Distributed by: Warner Bros. Pictures; The Vitaphone Corporation
- Release date: July 26, 1930; (earliest known date)
- Running time: 6:18
- Country: United States
- Language: English

Congo Jazz is a 1930 American animated comedy short film directed by Hugh Harman and Rudolf Ising. It is the second film in the Looney Tunes series starring Bosko. It was released as early as July 26, 1930. (Note: Archived from a July 29 article, this is based on the fact that new cartoon shorts would premiere in theaters on Saturdays.) Congo Jazz was the first cartoon to feature Bosko's falsetto voice, provided by Bernard B. Brown, that he would use for the bulk of the series' run; the previous Bosko short, Sinkin' in the Bathtub, had used a derisive African-American dialect.

== Plot ==
Full short

As Bosko is hunting in the jungle, a tiger creeps up behind him and gives him a lick. Finding his gun useless, Bosko tries to flee while the tiger gives chase. After having his body stretched and his head slapped off, Bosko pulls out a flute and begins playing music, which greatly entertains the tiger despite his tone-deaf playing. Bosko discovers that his music makes the tiger docile, dancing with it and playing its whiskers and tail like guitar strings. Now that the tiger has been rendered thoroughly harmless, Bosko kicks it off a cliff.

Bosko then spots two little monkeys playing leap frog. He picks one of them up, but the monkey spits in his eye. Bosko begins spanking the monkey's buttocks, until he notices an ape looming above him. Acting nonchalant towards his threats, Bosko offers the ape some chewing gum; befriending the ape as he is amazed by the stringency of the gum, playing notes while it is stretched. They both stretch the gum out of their mouths and begin plucking a tune. The rest of the jungle animals join in, performing music through gratuitous violence on each other or plants. A tree does a provocative fanny-slapping dance, gyrating its coconut bosoms, until one flies off and hits Bosko in the head. Bosko and three hyenas laugh.

== Home media ==
Congo Jazz is available on disc 3 of the Looney Tunes Golden Collection: Volume 6 DVD set.
