= Bosko the Sheep-Herder =

1933 film by Hugh Harman

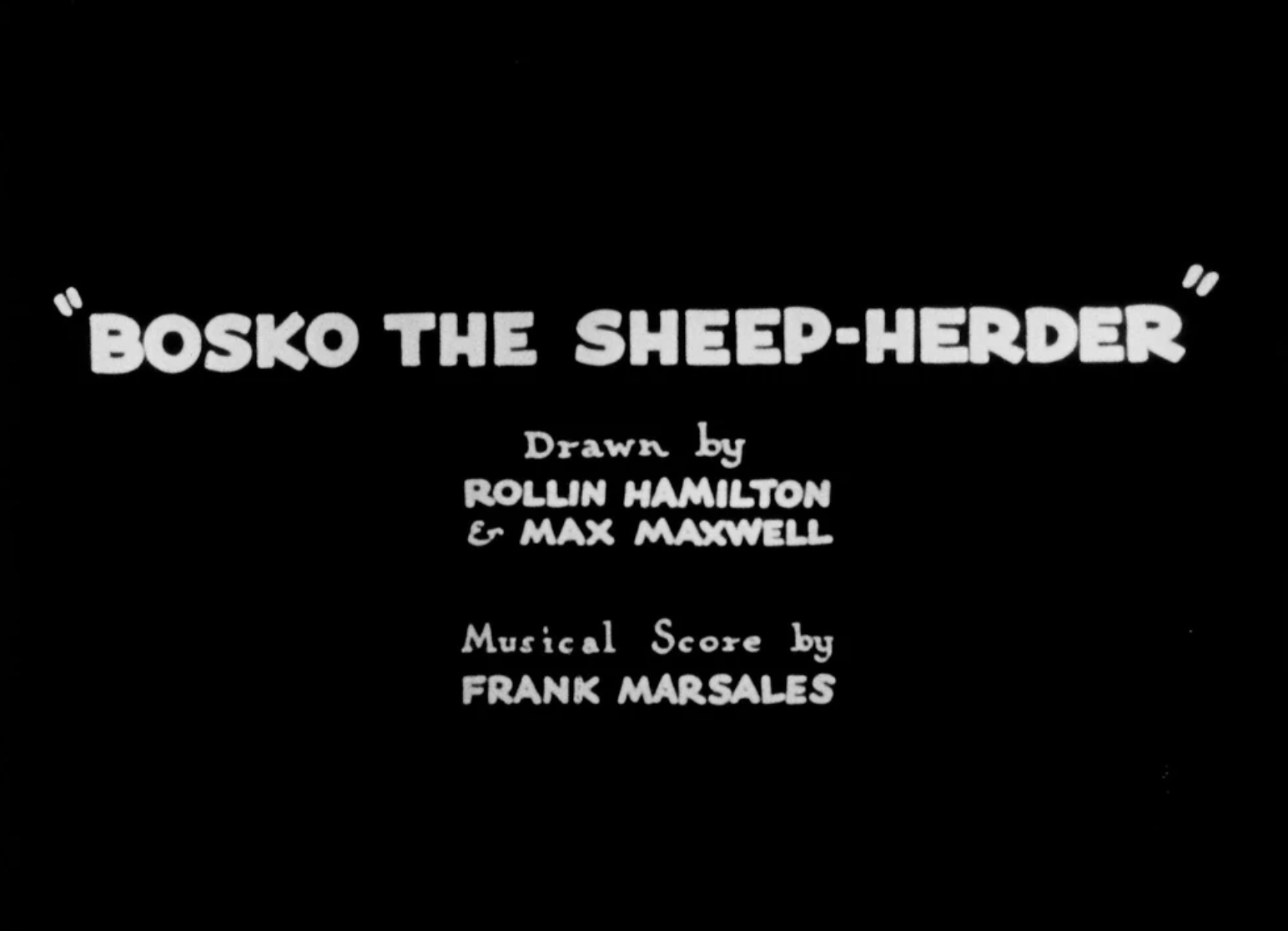
- Title card
- Directed by: Hugh Harman
- Produced by: Hugh Harman; Rudolf Ising; Leon Schlesinger
- Music by: Frank Marsales
- Animation by: Rollin Hamilton; Max Maxwell
- Color process: Black-and-white
- Production companies: Harman-Ising Productions; Leon Schlesinger Productions
- Distributed by: Warner Bros. Pictures; The Vitaphone Corporation
- Release date: June 14, 1933
- Running time: 7 min
- Country: United States
- Language: English

Bosko the Sheep-Herder is a 1933 American animated comedy short film directed by Hugh Harman. It is the 34th film in the Looney Tunes series featuring Bosko. It was released on June 14, 1933.

== Plot ==
Bosko plays on a piccolo while he minds lambs. One lamb dances along and eats flowers to the chagrin of a bee, who hits it with a bur from behind. It then eats a flower with a grasshopper in it, who fights back and angrily chews tobacco as it leaves.

The lamb beckons Bosko to play for it, as he fashions bagpipes out of a beehive and hollow branches. Bruno sleeps under a tree. Bosko finds a squirrel struggling to open a nut, allowing him to bite harder by manipulating his tail. The lamb's peers finds a large piece of grassland and consume it together. Meanwhile, a wolf sneaks near Bosko while he eats his sandwich lunch.

The lamb's peers drink milk from an udder fashioned from a milk bottle and one of Bosko's gloves. Meanwhile, the wolf follows the lamb while it eats flowers, donning a sheep's skin which fools the lamb until it removes the disguise and abducts the lamb. Bosko hears its call for help and wakes Bruno, who then follow it into a cave. A violent confrontation occurs inside, where Bosko rescues the lamb while Bruno fights and ultimately kills the wolf, donning its skin to scare Bosko before emerging victorious. Bruno and the lamb lick Bosko to his amusement.

== Reception ==
The Motion Picture Herald called It a "fair cartoon".
