= Bosko's Holiday =

1931 film

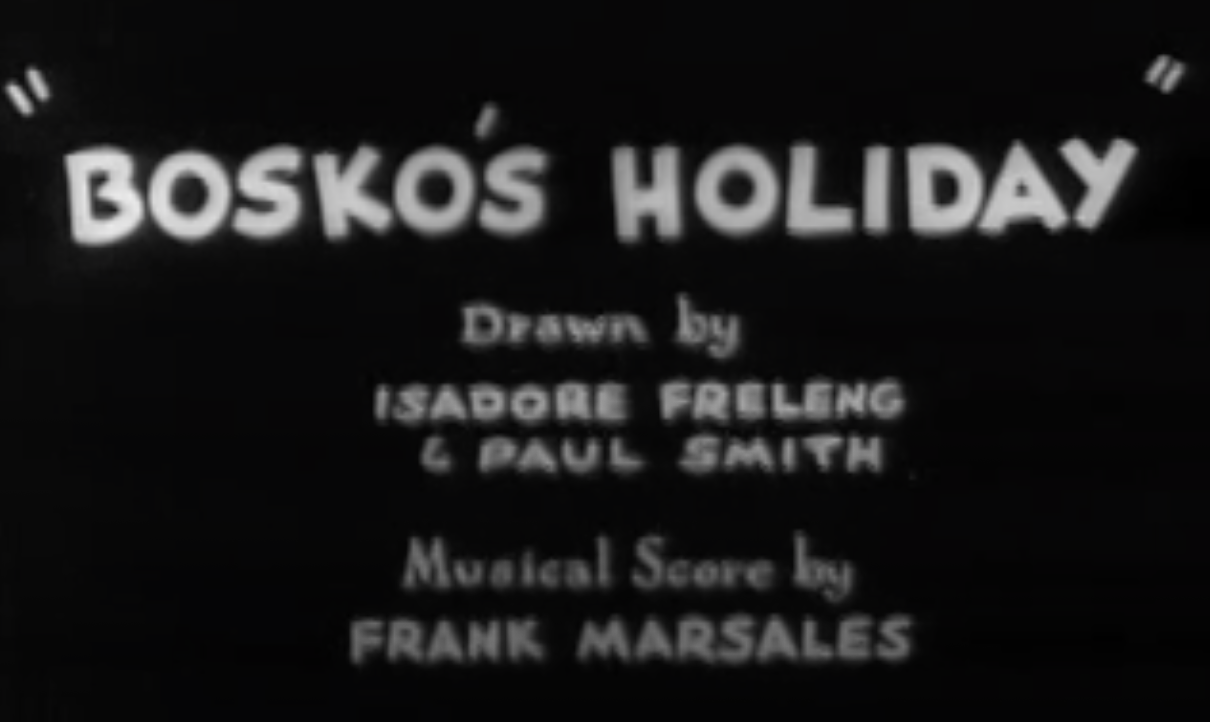
- Title card
- Directed by: Hugh Harman; Rudolf Ising
- Produced by: Hugh Harman; Rudolf Ising
- Starring: Johnny Murray; Rochelle Hudson (both uncredited)
- Music by: Frank Marsales
- Animation by: Isadore Freleng; Paul Smith
- Production company: Harman-Ising Productions
- Distributed by: Warner Bros. Pictures; The Vitaphone Corporation
- Release date: May 2, 1931; (earliest known date)
- Running time: 7:13
- Country: United States
- Language: English

Bosko's Holiday is a 1931 American animated comedy short film. It is the eleventh film in the Looney Tunes series featuring Bosko. It was released as early as May 2, 1931. (Note: Archived from a May 4 article, this is based on the fact that new cartoon shorts would premiere in theaters on Saturdays. It could've actually premiered on April 25.) It was directed by Hugh Harman and Rudolf Ising, and the film score was composed by Frank Marsales. It marks a turning point in the Looney Tunes series, focusing on visual gags over musical elements, which were relegated to the then-new Merrie Melodies series, while reusing a lot of animation from its predecessors.

== Plot ==
Full short

Bosko sleeps and neglects a phone call from Honey. His alarm clock, also neglecting his duty, is woken up by the phone to be reminded to wake Bosko up. After a series of heavy-handed solutions do not work, the alarm clock assaults Bosko, causing him to wake up screaming. He unwillingly listens to the phone call, only to jump in joy after hearing Honey's voice. Bosko drives away on his car from Sinkin' in the Bathtub, now with numerous offspring which Bosko instructs to return home.

Bosko plays on his banjo, only for a string to break; he uses a mouse's tail as a replacement, much to its chagrin. The mouse refuses to let Bosko remove its tail a second time and leaves. Bosko mocks the mouse before reaching Honey's house. As Honey is carried down and they drive away together, her dog appears, wanting affection from Bosko. Honey's dog ends up hindering Bosko's attempt to drive up a steep slope, before biting on a tire to deflate it and inflate himself. Bosko deflates him to restore the tire, angering the dog as he walks away.

Bosko and Honey get off the car and walk to a log with Honey's dog following. They flirt with each other and enjoy their time together, but the dog licks Honey's buttocks from behind, causing her to walk away furiously. Bosko is confused at the ruckus he causes throughout the events of the film.
