= Bosko in Person =

1933 film by Hugh Harman and Isadore Freleng

- Directed by: Hugh Harman; Isadore Freleng
- Produced by: Hugh Harman; Rudolf Ising; Leon Schlesinger
- Starring: Johnny Murray; Rochelle Hudson; Rudolf Ising; Ken Darby (uncredited)
- Music by: Frank Marsales
- Animation by: Rollin Hamilton; Bob McKimson
- Color process: Black-and-white
- Production companies: Harman-Ising Productions; Leon Schlesinger Productions
- Distributed by: Warner Bros. Pictures; The Vitaphone Corporation
- Release date: February 11, 1933
- Running time: 7 min.
- Country: United States
- Language: English

Bosko in Person is a 1933 American animated comedy short film directed by Hugh Harman and Isadore Freleng. It is the 31st film in the Looney Tunes series featuring Bosko. It was released on February 11, 1933.

== Plot ==
Bosko and Honey perform in a vaudeville act. The title card is an asbestos stage, which opens showing Bosko playing "Whistle and Blow Your Blues Away" on the piano while Honey dances along. They then sing and tap dance to the song. Bosko commands one of his gloves to roll on the piano, and asks it to sing "Mary Had a Little Lamb" which it refuses multiple times, but eventually relents.

Bosko tap dances and suddenly trips, then repeats the same routine. Honey then does an impression of Tess Gardella's Aunt Jemima persona as well as Greta Garbo. Bosko then sings again while imitating Maurice Chevalier. Reaching for the piano, he blows a balloon and places it on his nose in an impression of Jimmy Durante. The crowd boos him, but changes their mind and cheers after Bosko quotes Durante humorously. He then impersonates Ted Lewis with his trumpet and clarinet playing while Honey dances, only to do the tap dancing routine again and fall into a drum, doing the Durante impression again. Bosko then reaches for a drum with Franklin D. Roosevelt on it, who swings a pint of beer as Bosko marches it in support of him in the 1932 United States presidential election as the act comes to a close.

== Home media ==
Bosko in Person is available on disc 3 of the Looney Tunes Golden Collection: Volume 6 DVD set.
