= Bosko the Lumberjack =

1932 film

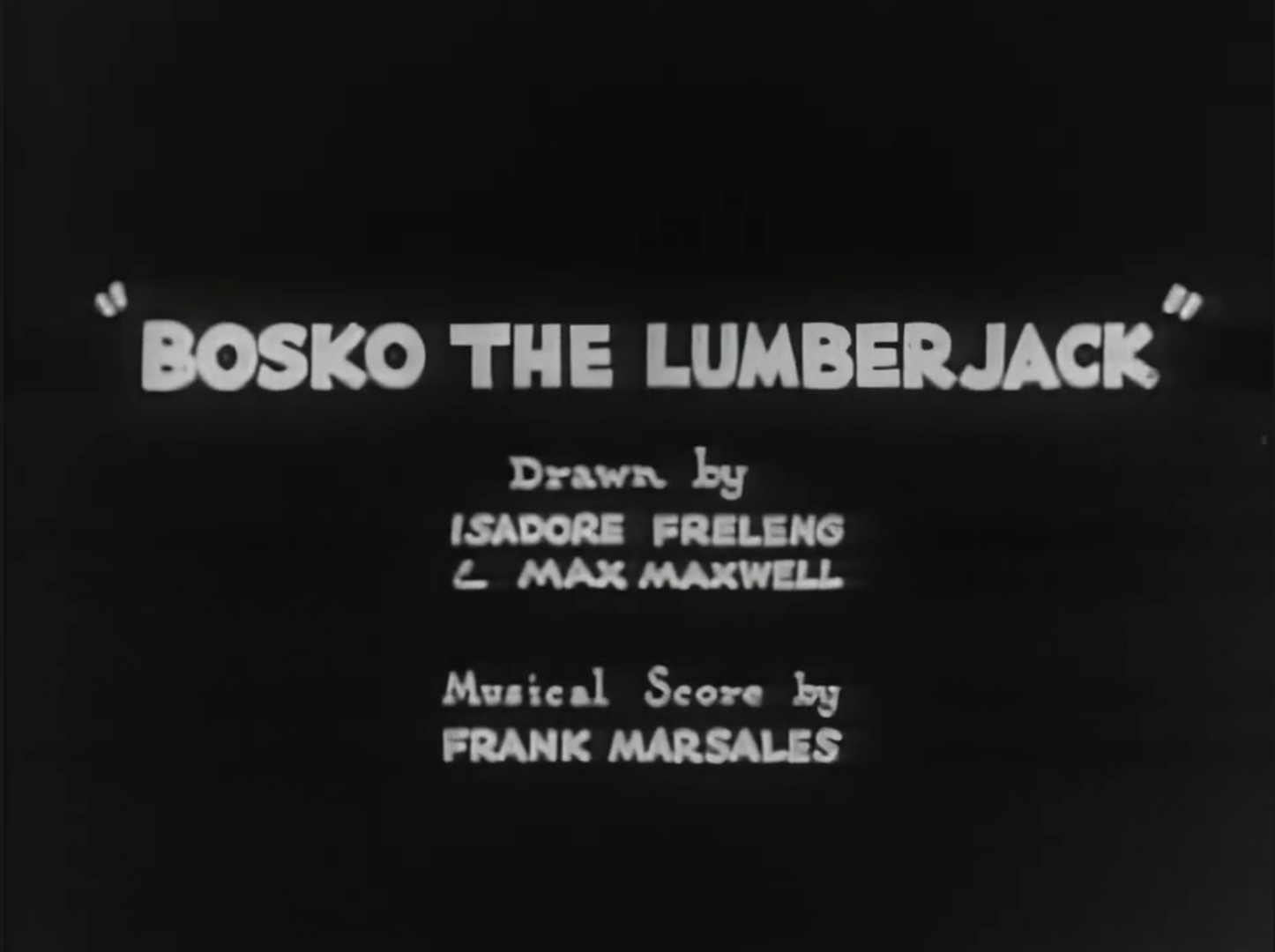
- Title card
- Directed by: Hugh Harman
- Produced by: Hugh Harman; Rudolf Ising; Leon Schlesinger
- Music by: Frank Marsales
- Animation by: Isadore Freleng; Max Maxwell
- Color process: Black-and-white
- Production companies: Harman-Ising Productions; Leon Schlesinger Productions
- Distributed by: Warner Bros. Pictures; The Vitaphone Corporation
- Release date: September 3, 1932
- Running time: 7 min.
- Country: United States
- Language: English

Bosko the Lumberjack is an American animated comedy short film directed by Hugh Harman. It is the 25th film in the Looney Tunes series featuring Bosko. It was released on September 3, 1932.

== Plot ==
Full short

A group of animal lumberjacks work in a forest. One log walks by itself to be processed. A dog lumberjack ingeniously cuts the bottom of the tree without having it fall, before cutting above the incision to form smaller pieces. Bosko cuts a small tree, which attempts to wriggle to freedom before giving up. He prances around the woods before finding a small tree on a rock, which turns out to be a sleeping moose.

Bosko finds a large tree then spits, which conveniently ricochet off the tree onto his gloves. He cuts once, only to find a skunk living inside, which he escapes from and runs into a tree, whose leaves fall on him. He uses a woodpecker to cut off a log. Honey comes by and gives him his lunch, He graciously enjoys the sandwich Honey prepared for him.

Elsewhere, an old lumberjack eats a "sandwich" made of wood slices and nails, which he tolerates until he finds a bent nail. He sees Bosko enjoying Honey's sandwich, prompting him to abduct Honey with a hook and sexually assault her. Bosko climbs up to confront the lumberjack, who then knocks him down onto a log ready to be sawed. The saw hits his buttocks, which launches him outward in pain and saves him from being killed. Honey attempts to escape using a rope which sounds a horn. The lumberjack subdues Bosko again by using a tree water dispenser against him.

The lumberjack goes on a canoe and paddles away with Honey. Bosko catches up by riding a makeshift log canoe operated by three mice. The lumberjack goes into his cabin, blocking Bosko from entering, only to be shot in the back by his deer head trophy with a shotgun. He knocks Bosko into four pillars and into below the bead, hitting a crown. Bosko is then knocked into a stove, a bearskin carpet and eventually a bear trap. As a last stand, Bosko finds an axe, which he tries to swing but is jammed into a barrel, only for the barrel to successfully incapacitate the lumberjack. Honey thanks Bosko for his heroic efforts, only for a portrait of Napoleon to fall on Bosko to their amusement.

== Reception ==
The Film Daily called it "Okay", noting "the cartoon work is novel, and moves fast with plenty good animated gags".
