= Bosko's Mechanical Man =

1933 film by Hugh Harman

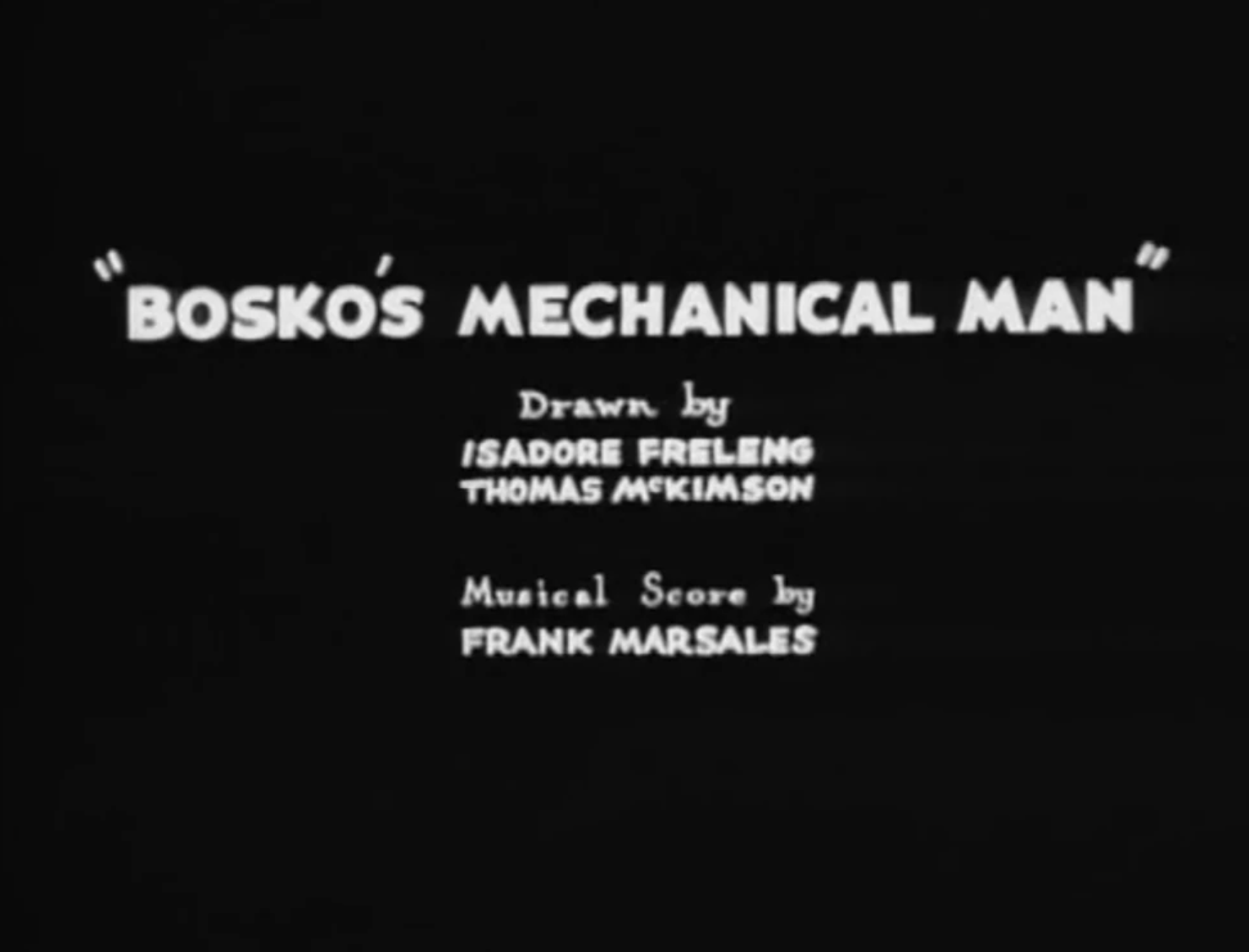
- Title card
- Directed by: Hugh Harman
- Produced by: Hugh Harman; Rudolf Ising; Leon Schlesinger
- Music by: Frank Marsales
- Animation by: Isadore Freleng; Thomas McKimson
- Color process: Black-and-white
- Production companies: Harman-Ising Productions; Leon Schlesinger Productions
- Distributed by: Warner Bros. Pictures; The Vitaphone Corporation
- Release date: July 22, 1933
- Running time: 7 min
- Country: United States
- Language: English

Bosko's Mechanical Man is a 1933 American animated comedy short film directed by Hugh Harman. It is the 36th film in the Looney Tunes series featuring Bosko. It was released on July 22, 1933.

== Plot ==
Honey wipes a window, as Bosko comes by and writes "I love you" on it. Despite expecting a date, Bosko is instead forced to help Honey wash her dishes to his chagrin. He gathers a tower of dishes to quickly finish his job, but accidentally drops them and angers Honey. As he refuses to take accountability for his mistake, he spots a newspaper praising robots and haphazardly builds one out of a stove and random parts.

The robot predictably does not work as expected, but as Bosko toggles a free-wheeling mode, the robot runs into Honey's house, only to be stopped by Honey's perfume which renders it effeminate and docile. Though it attempts to return to normal, Honey stuffs a record player into the robot, causing it to sing "Mary Had a Little Lamb" and dance to the music, which temporarily works. It chases Bosko and Honey out and electrocutes an oblivious Bruno with the telephone. Bosko finds a barrel of TNT and throws it into the robot's mouth, destroying it.
