= Bosko in Dutch =

1933 film by Hugh Harman

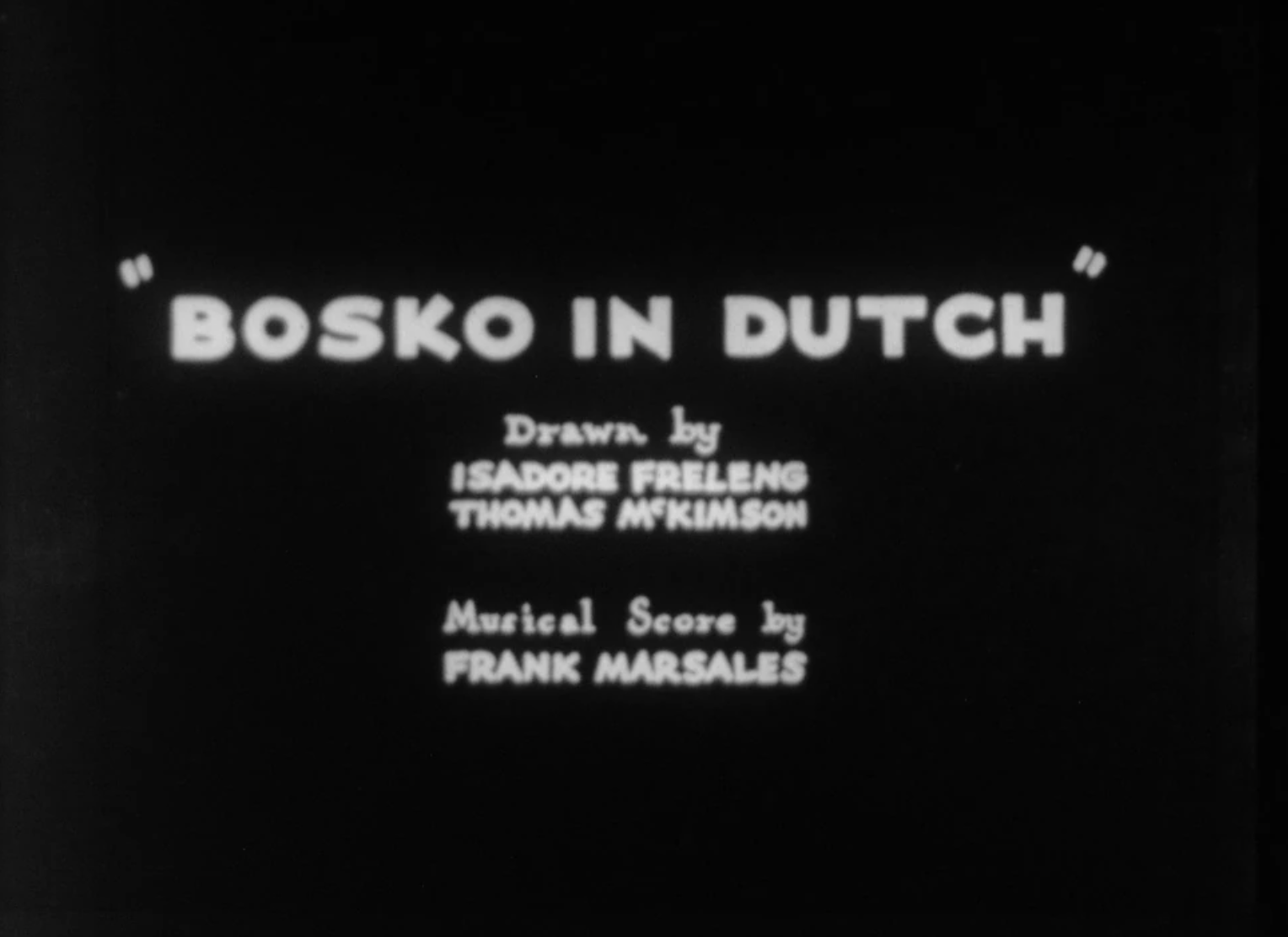
- Title card
- Directed by: Hugh Harman; Isadore Freleng
- Produced by: Hugh Harman; Rudolf Ising; Leon Schlesinger
- Music by: Frank Marsales
- Animation by: Isadore Freleng; Thomas McKimson
- Color process: Black and white
- Production companies: Harman-Ising Productions; Leon Schlesinger Productions
- Distributed by: Warner Bros. Pictures; The Vitaphone Corporation
- Release date: January 14, 1933
- Running time: 7 min
- Country: United States
- Language: English

Bosko in Dutch is a 1933 American animated comedy short film directed by Hugh Harman and Isadore Freleng. It is the 30th film in the Looney Tunes series featuring Bosko. It was released on January 14, 1933. It is the first Looney Tunes and non-Oswald the Lucky Rabbit cartoon to be directed by Freleng, who would become one of the series' most prominent directors for decades.

== Plot ==
In the Netherlands, a group of animals go ice skating on a frozen pond. Bosko skates while delivering milk alongside Bruno. Goopy Geer dances while ice skating. A dachshund resorts to using a sled and a large skate to maneuver the environment, while a duck skates with its offspring in tiny sleds, one of which goes to the outhouse at a windmill.

One of the milk canisters fall off, attracting a group of catfish who humorously resemble actual cats. As Bruno scratches himself and releases a legion of fleas, Bosko trips over a boulder. He eventually arrives at Honey's windmill where they sing, dance and swap shoes. Wilber and a lookalike or sibling skate and narrowly avoid a puddle, which they eventually fail to do so after a cuckoo clock sounds an alarm. Bosko goes to save them, hanging from a clothes line which allows him to return to the house with both kittens easily, but the trio fall to the ground. The two kittens fall onto a piece of ice which shatters around the portion they are on. They flow down the rapids into the sewers, allowing Bosko to flush them out to safety.

== Reception ==
The Motion Picture Herald called It a "clever cartoon".
