= Big Man from the North =

1930 film

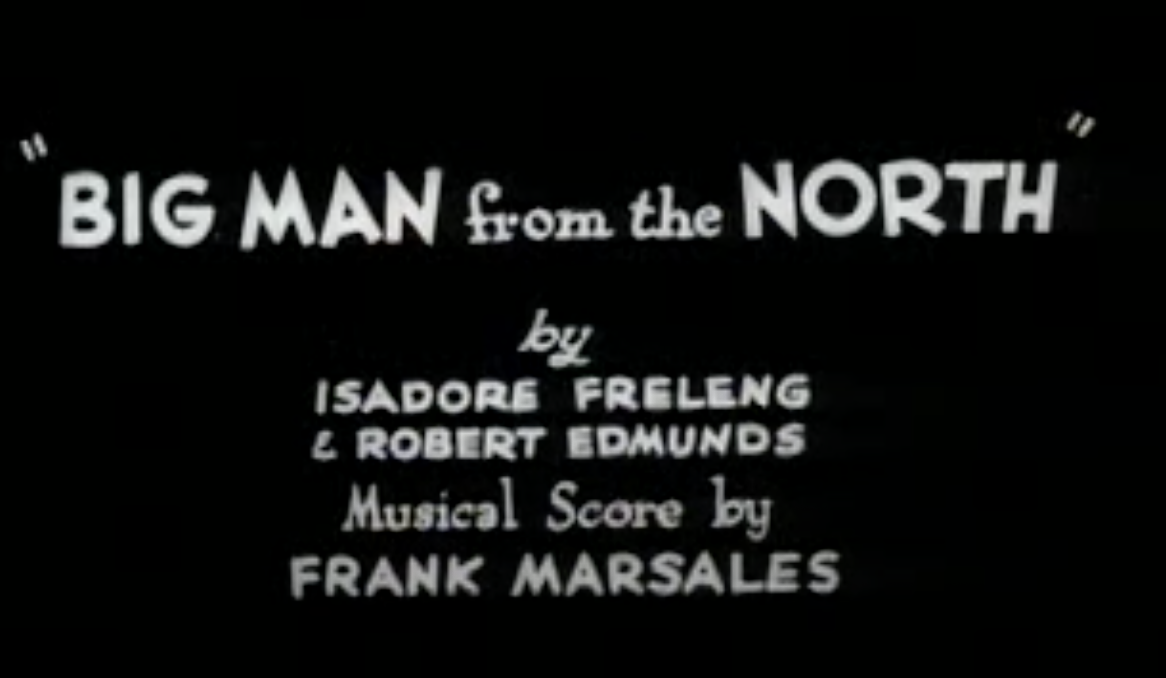
- Title card
- Directed by: Hugh Harman; Rudolf Ising
- Produced by: Hugh Harman; Rudolf Ising
- Starring: Johnny Murray; Rochelle Hudson (both uncredited)
- Music by: Frank Marsales
- Animation by: Isadore Freleng; Robert Edmunds
- Color process: Black-and-white
- Production company: Harman-Ising Productions
- Distributed by: Warner Bros. Pictures; The Vitaphone Corporation
- Release date: November 22, 1930; (earliest known date)
- Running time: 7:46
- Country: United States
- Language: English

Big Man from the North is a 1930 American animated comedy short film. It was the sixth film in the Looney Tunes series featuring Bosko. It was directed by Hugh Harman and Rudolf Ising. It was released as early as November 22, 1930.

== Plot ==
Full short

At a mounted police headquarters in a snowstorm, a dog sergeant smokes and spits tobacco while waiting for it to stop. He hears a knock at the door and opens it to find Bosko being blown into the house. The sergeant is unintentionally pantsed by Bosko as he attempts to hold on before being slammed into the wall. Confused by the commotion, Bosko unintentionally agrees to catch a wanted criminal and is assigned as an officer. Bosko rides off on his sled, driven by two dachshunds and a puppy. They crash into a saloon as the dogs, smashed together and tired of Bosko's antics, leave out of spite. Bosko enters the saloon after wearing his police badge and preparing his two revolvers. He gawks at Honey dancing in the saloon, before impressing her and the crowd by joining in the dance. He plays on the piano while animals perform music, only for the crowd to escape after the criminal appears.

The criminal demands alcohol and is angered by the bartender's absence while Bosko approaches with his two revolvers. The criminal mocks Bosko's small stature and his decision to equip toy replica revolvers. However, Bosko extinguishes the candle in the bar, causing the criminal to waste ammunition in darkness, only for Bosko to reemerge with a legitimate minigun and shoot is buttocks. The criminal furiously brandishes a machete and launches himself at Bosko, who closes the door, incapacitating him while Bosko stabs the machete into his buttocks. Bosko shoots him with a shotgun as he yelps in pain, revealing his muscular appearance to be a façade under a thick layer of fur. The bar's customers reemerge and celebrate Bosko as the humiliated criminal exits the bar.
