= Bosko and Bruno =

1932 animated short film by Hugh Harman

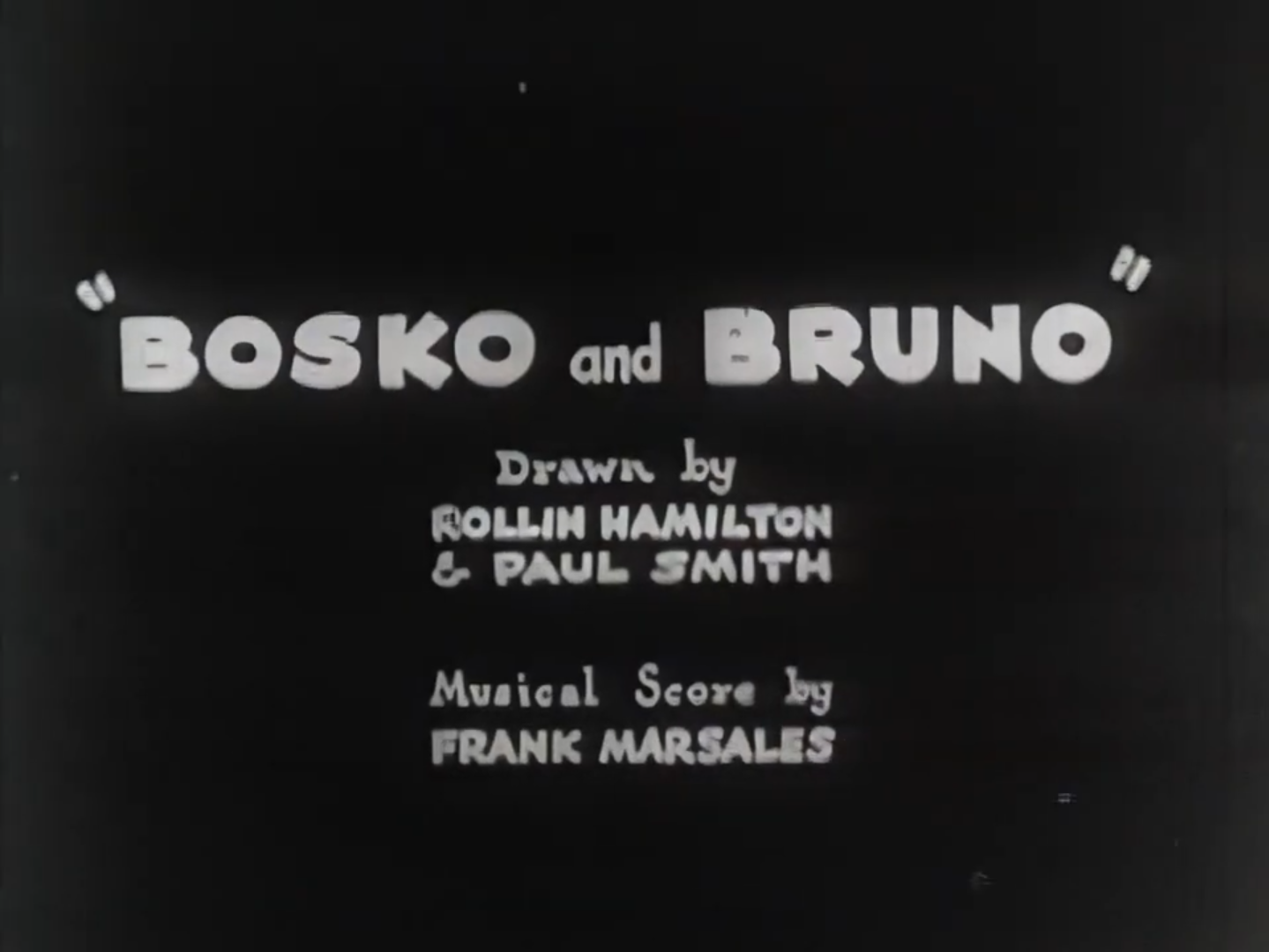
- Title card
- Directed by: Hugh Harman
- Produced by: Hugh Harman; Rudolf Ising; Leon Schlesinger
- Music by: Frank Marsales
- Animation by: Rollin Hamilton; Paul Smith
- Production companies: Harman-Ising Productions; Leon Schlesinger Productions
- Distributed by: Warner Bros. Pictures; The Vitaphone Corporation
- Release date: April 30, 1932
- Running time: 7 min
- Country: United States
- Language: English

Bosko and Bruno is a 1932 American animated comedy short film directed by Hugh Harman. It is the 21st film in the Looney Tunes series featuring Bosko. It was released on April 30, 1932.

== Plot ==
Full short

Bosko and his pet dog Bruno walk on train tracks. Bruno finds a flea on his back, which evades his attempts to remove it, only to be flicked off his tail. To their horror, a train is behind them, so Bosko abandons his belongings and runs for his life.

They find an inappropriately placed handcar, which helps them navigate the uneven tracks quickly, but they lose it after tripping over a rock. As the train nears them, Bruno gets his foot trapped in a vent on the track, with Bosko frantically trying to save him to no avail. Bosko mournfully cries while Bruno is seemingly run over, only for Bruno to reveal that he hid in the vent on time, angering Bosko.

Bosko and Bruno go into a cave, reaching solid ground after they run out and find a cow walking, which they had mistaken for a train. To their delight, they find chicken tracks that lead to a chicken coop. Excited at the prospect of acquiring eggs, Bosko commands Bruno to chase a chicken. The chicken runs into a lawn mower, which causes its feathers to land on Bruno. After Bruno shakes off the feathers, he and Bosko are pursued by the chicken's owner with a shotgun, which does not work as intended. They jump onto the last boxcar of a train, which tumbles off a steep mountain and eventually behind a cow. Bosko attempts to stop it to no avail, as they crash into a tree, leaving the cow mangled, who walks away angrily, while Bosko and Bruno are disturbed by the event.
