= Battling Bosko =

1932 film

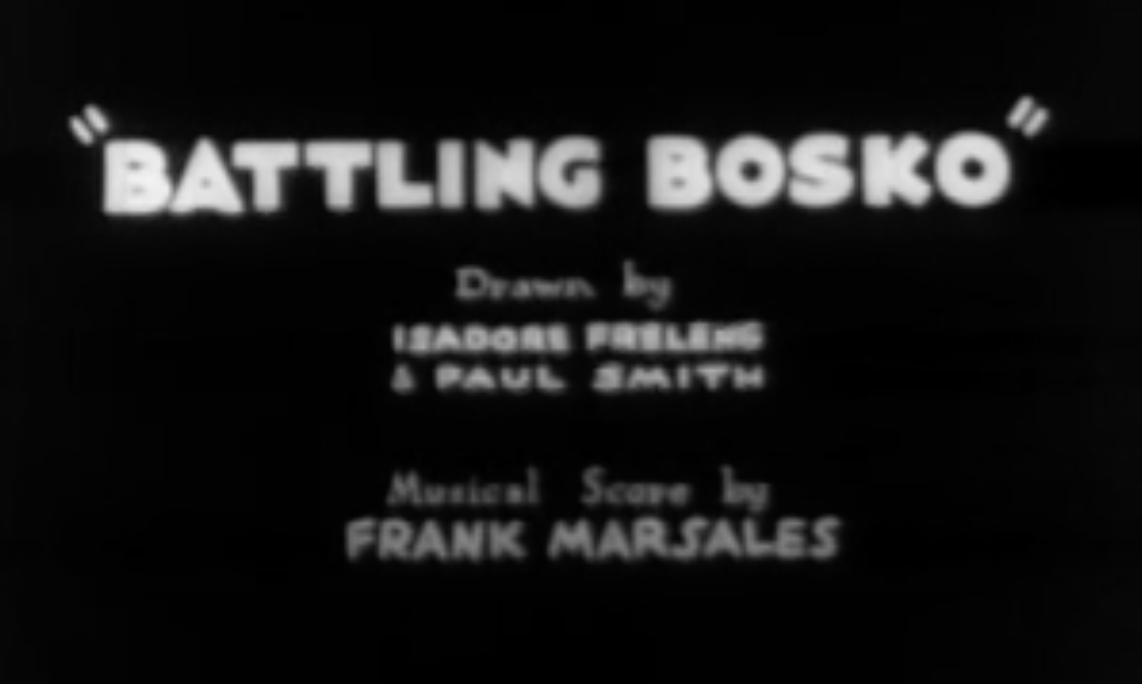
- Title card
- Directed by: Hugh Harman
- Produced by: Hugh Harman; Rudolf Ising; Leon Schlesinger
- Music by: Frank Marsales
- Animation by: Isadore Freleng; Paul Smith
- Color process: Black-and-white
- Production companies: Harman-Ising Productions; Leon Schlesinger Productions
- Distributed by: Warner Bros. Pictures; The Vitaphone Corporation
- Release date: January 22, 1932
- Running time: 6:40
- Country: United States
- Language: English

Battling Bosko is an American animated short film. It is the eighteenth film in the Looney Tunes series featuring Bosko. It was directed by Hugh Harman, with musical direction by Frank Marsales. The film was released on January 22, 1932.

== Plot ==
The full short

Bosko prepares for a boxing competition, training with his punching bag in an unserious manner to the point he kicks it with his legs. Honey listens to the radio as it announces the match and mocks Bosko's chances of winning, much to her disdain. Bosko's opponent, Gas House Harry, is a muscular individual with overwhelming strength who is seen punching an anvil for training. Bosko is knocked out by his punching bag, allowing him to receive a call from Honey as they sing together.

Ecstatic fans arrive through stuffed trolleys. Graham Cracker (a parody of Graham McNamee) announces that the fighters are entering the ring. The match begins when the referee, an ostrich, rings the bell with a cat's tail. Bosko is initially knocked out in one punch, bouncing across the arena before hitting the bell itself. Bosko's manager rushes to his aid, fanning him and gently spraying him with water until he playfully insists that his manager stop it. Despite this, Bosko quickly proves his skill by dodging numerous punches and managing to hit Harry's head once, briefly knocking him out such that the ship tattooed on his chest sinks. The ostrich-referee is watching closely, occasionally coming between the competitors to calm them down or gleefully dance until they mutually knock him out of the arena. Bosko dodges punch after punch, while Honey nervously listens. Bosko is seen unable to keep up, being hit repeatedly such that he recoils like a punching bag. Bosko seems finished and the count begins.

Honey and her dog race towards the stadium (briefly delayed when the dog's tail is caught in the door). She reaches Bosko's side and calls out to him. Immediately reviving, he bemoans the situation and sleeps while using part of the arena as a blanket, much to Honey's chagrin.

== Reception ==
Motion Picture Herald called the film a "Good Cartoon".
