= Bosko's Store =

1932 film

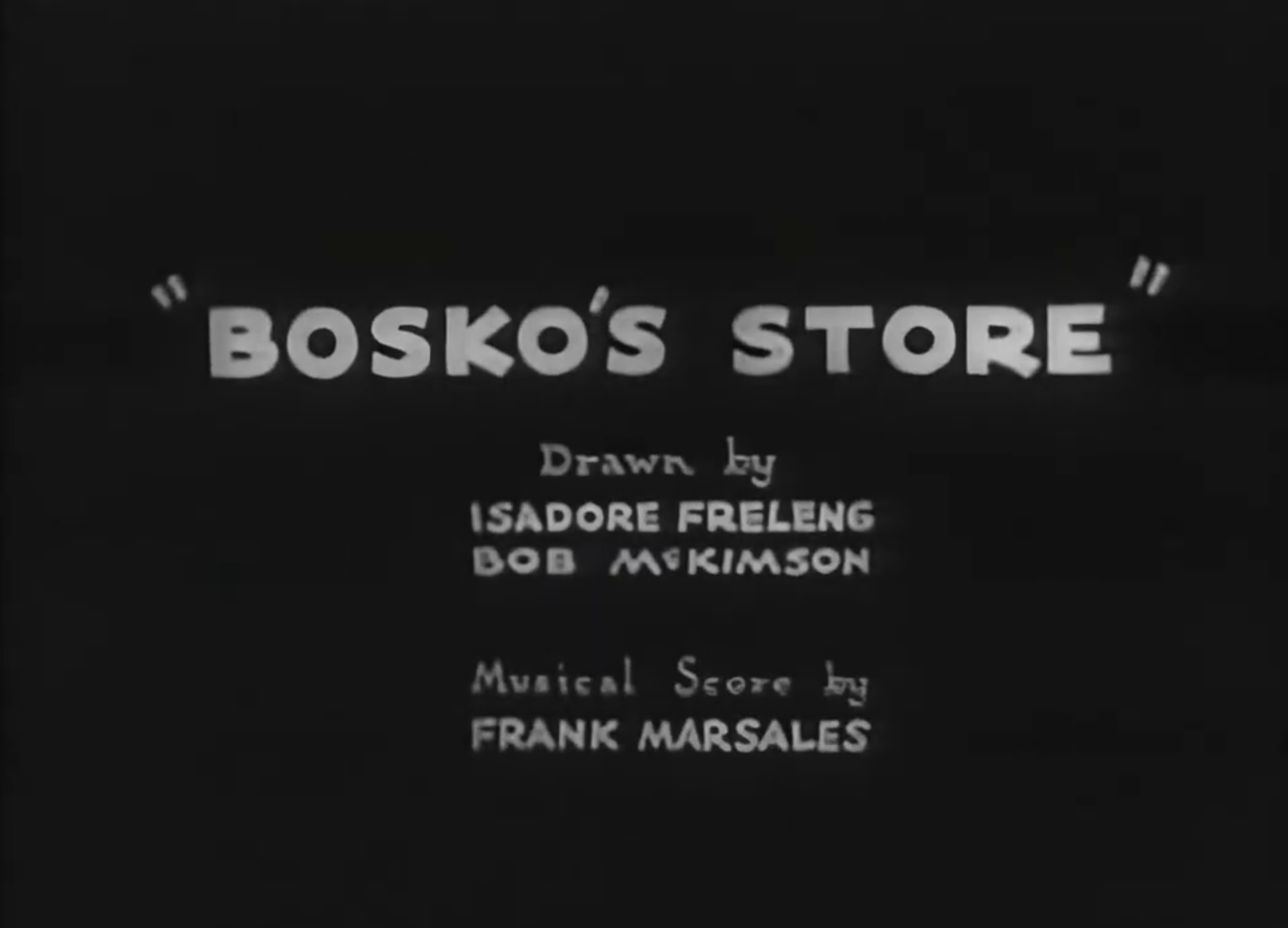
- Title card
- Directed by: Hugh Harman
- Produced by: Hugh Harman; Rudolf Ising; Leon Schlesinger
- Starring: Bernard B. Brown (uncredited)
- Music by: Frank Marsales
- Animation by: Isadore Freleng; Bob McKimson
- Color process: Black-and-white
- Production companies: Harman-Ising Productions; Leon Schlesinger Productions
- Distributed by: Warner Bros. Pictures; The Vitaphone Corporation
- Release date: August 13, 1932
- Running time: 7 min.
- Country: United States
- Language: English

Bosko's Store is a 1932 American animated comedy short film directed by Hugh Harman. It is the 24th film in the Looney Tunes series featuring Bosko, and the first to be animated by veteran animator Robert McKimson, who would be involved with the series until its conclusion in 1969. It was released on August 13, 1932.

== Plot ==
Full short

Bosko opens his store for the day, wiping the storefront window. A customer calls him for bologna, which he obliges and cuts with a fan absentmindedly. A passing dachshund exploits this opportunity to eat all the bologna. Bosko chases the dachshund through the fan, which slices it like bologna before he is reassembled in painful manner. Bosko dances while dusting the shop, including fresh fertilized eggs and a mascot resembling a mammy, which hits him in the head with a club.

In another house, a mouse flings himself onto the telephone through a curtain for a prank call, which Bosko answers. Bosko then sweeps the outside of the shop, waltzing with the broom in the process. He finds Bruno sleeping, gently lifting him to sweep the floor before leaving him be.

Honey and Wilber approach the store, which Bosko reacts warmly to Wilber's chagrin. Bosko pays a player piano, which plays a song on a piano roll that Bosko and Honey sing and dance to. To Bosko's chagrin, Wilber eats bananas without paying, causing Bosko to intervene. Wilber retaliates by shooting a banana's flesh at Bosko, sending him tumbling into a trolley which flings him into the wall. He is knocked unconscious then revived by a cash register, which also sends him tumbling into a barrel of molasses, which sticks his shoes to the floor. Meanwhile, Wilber accidentally lands on a rotary grater, grating him into miniature forms of himself before regrouping. Bosko chases Wilber on his socks, who then rides a ladder and kicks down cans of ketchup on him, before Wilber runs barbed wire on Bosko's genitalia in painful manner.

== Reception ==
The Film Daily called it a "Good Cartoon", calling it a "thoroughly entertaining animated cartoon number".
