= Bosko at the Zoo =

1932 film

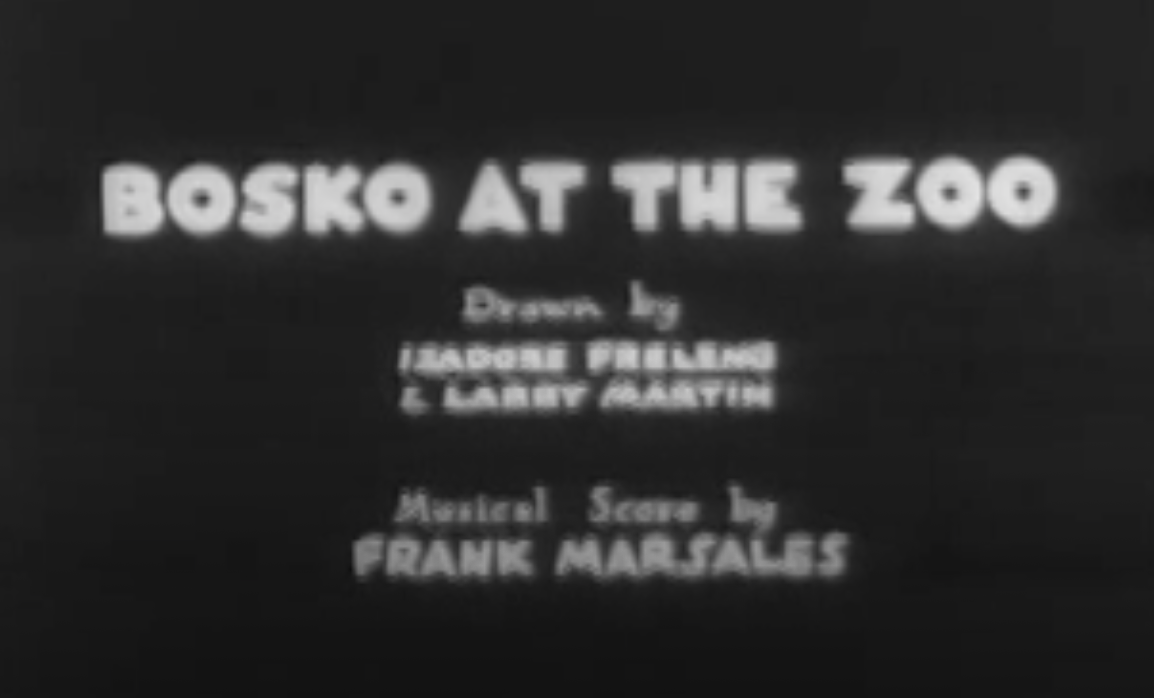
- Title card
- Directed by: Hugh Harman
- Produced by: Hugh Harman; Rudolf Ising; Leon Schlesinger
- Music by: Frank Marsales
- Animation by: Isadore Freleng; Larry Martin
- Color process: Black-and-white
- Production companies: Harman-Ising Productions; Leon Schlesinger Productions
- Distributed by: Warner Bros. Pictures; The Vitaphone Corporation
- Release date: January 2, 1932
- Running time: 6:54
- Country: United States
- Language: English

Bosko at the Zoo is a 1932 American animated comedy short film. It is the seventeenth film in the Looney Tunes series featuring Bosko. It was released on January 2, 1932. It was directed by Hugh Harman. Frank Marsales was its musical director.

== Plot ==
The full short

Bosko and Honey bike to the zoo. They encounter an angry lion, who scares them away, as well as an aquarium. In the tank, two small fish swim to the beat of music and escape from a larger fish, followed by an octopus and more small fish who play with its tentacles like a carousel. An ostrich steals Bosko's bowler hat while he is distracted, sparking his fury as he pursues it.

Bosko unsuccessfully uses a lasso to restrain the ostrich, falling onto a porcupine and causing it to lose its quills, annoying the porcupine as it forcefully reclaims its quills. He catches up to the ostrich by holding onto its tail, which it responds by eating his hat. This pushes Bosko to his limits, as he grabs the ostrich by its neck and forces it to stay in its nest in terror. Bosko ponders about a possible solution when the ostrich lays an egg with his hat in it. The ostrich attempts to retrieve the hat again but fails. It pleads for Bosko to let it have it to no avail and cries miserably, only to be cheered up by Bosko playing the clarinet. They happily sing and dance while other animals follow suit.

Meanwhile, a monkey finds a flea on another monkey, kills it and stops the other half monkey from trying to eat it. The other monkey attracts Bosko's attention, who disciplines the monkey by slapping its buttocks, only for an ape to chase him. He attempts to get away, only for the ape to chase him again to the enclosure's exit. He jumps onto a giant snake and swings away, landing on the lion who follows suit. He jumps on the fence as the lion slams onto the wall alongside the ostrich and a walrus, amused by the sight of the three animals being smashed into one.

== Reception ==
Motion Picture Herald reported, "When the six tentacles of the octopus are used as the arms of the maypole, the patrons at a New York neighborhood house had an enjoyable few moments."
