= Bosko the Speed King =

1933 film by Hugh Harman

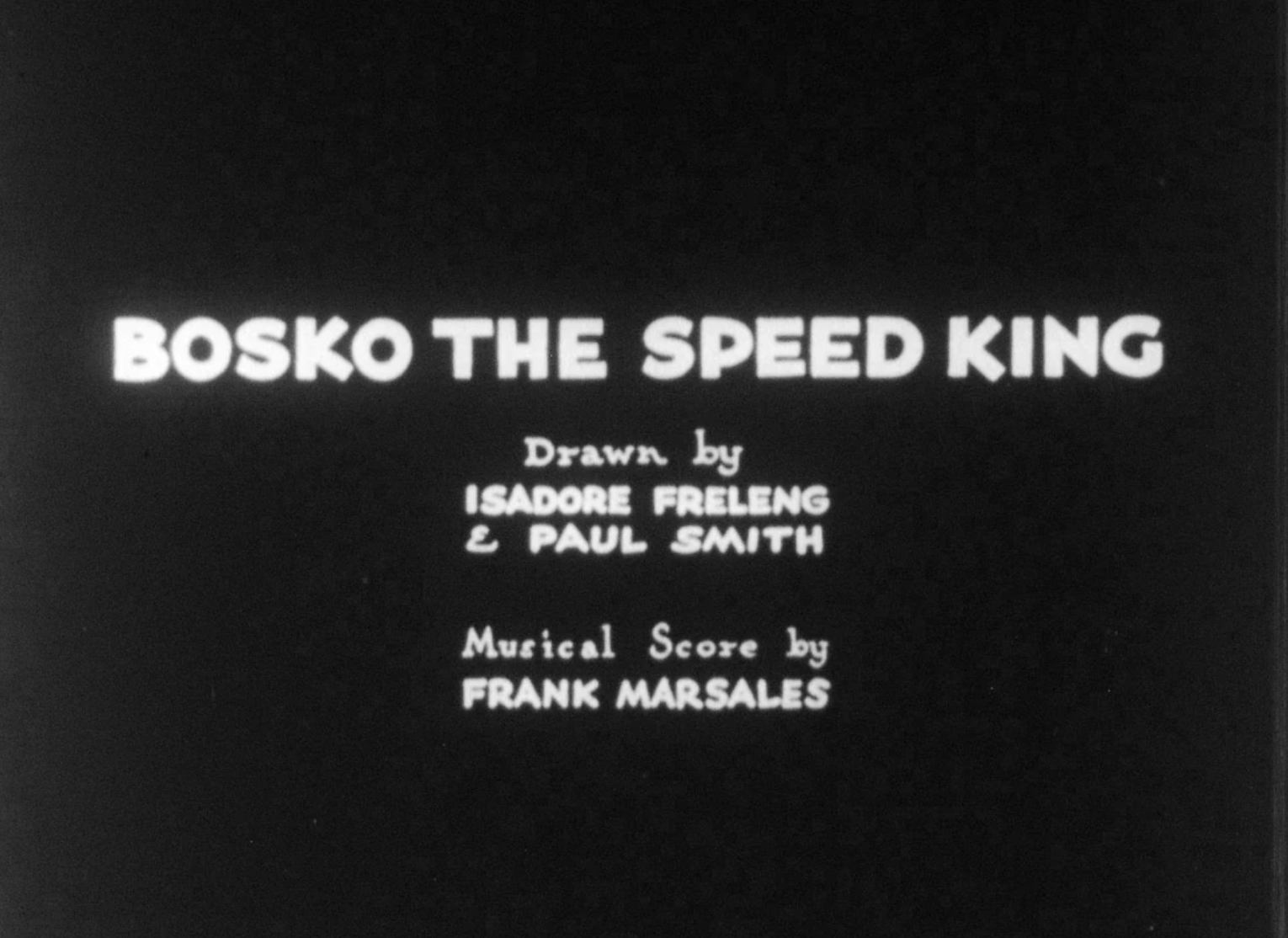
- Title card
- Directed by: Hugh Harman
- Produced by: Hugh Harman; Rudolf Ising; Leon Schlesinger
- Music by: Frank Marsales
- Animation by: Isadore Freleng; Paul Smith
- Color process: Black-and-white
- Production companies: Harman-Ising Productions; Leon Schlesinger Productions
- Distributed by: Warner Bros. Pictures; The Vitaphone Corporation
- Release date: March 5, 1933
- Running time: 7 min
- Country: United States
- Language: English

Bosko the Speed King is a 1933 American animated comedy short film directed by Hugh Harman. It is the 32nd film in the Looney Tunes series featuring Bosko. It was released on March 5, 1933.

== Plot ==
Bosko partakes in auto racing. As he repairs his vehicle, a smaller model than his competitors', Honey reads a newspaper about the event and throws shade at the poised-to-win champion. To their chagrin, the champion lights a match using the vehicle as a sign of mockery. As Honey walks to the band area to play music, Bosko tests out the vehicle's functionality.

The match starts after the referee fails to stop stuttering on time, with various illogically constructed cars being left behind. The champion sabotages the match by throwing tacks on the road, popping tires including one on Bosko's vehicle. He uses a stray cat to quickly repair it. Catching up to the champion, Bosko is deliberately hit with soot which he removes with his mechanical goggles. He swerves left and right, realizing he could exploit the champion who consistently follows him to block his way. The vehicle comes to life and bites that of the champion's, allowing it to surpass as the champion's vehicle jumps and yelps in pain. Bosko comes in first and is kissed by an excited Honey, letting off soot to cover them for privacy.
