= Bosko at the Beach =

1932 film by Hugh Harman

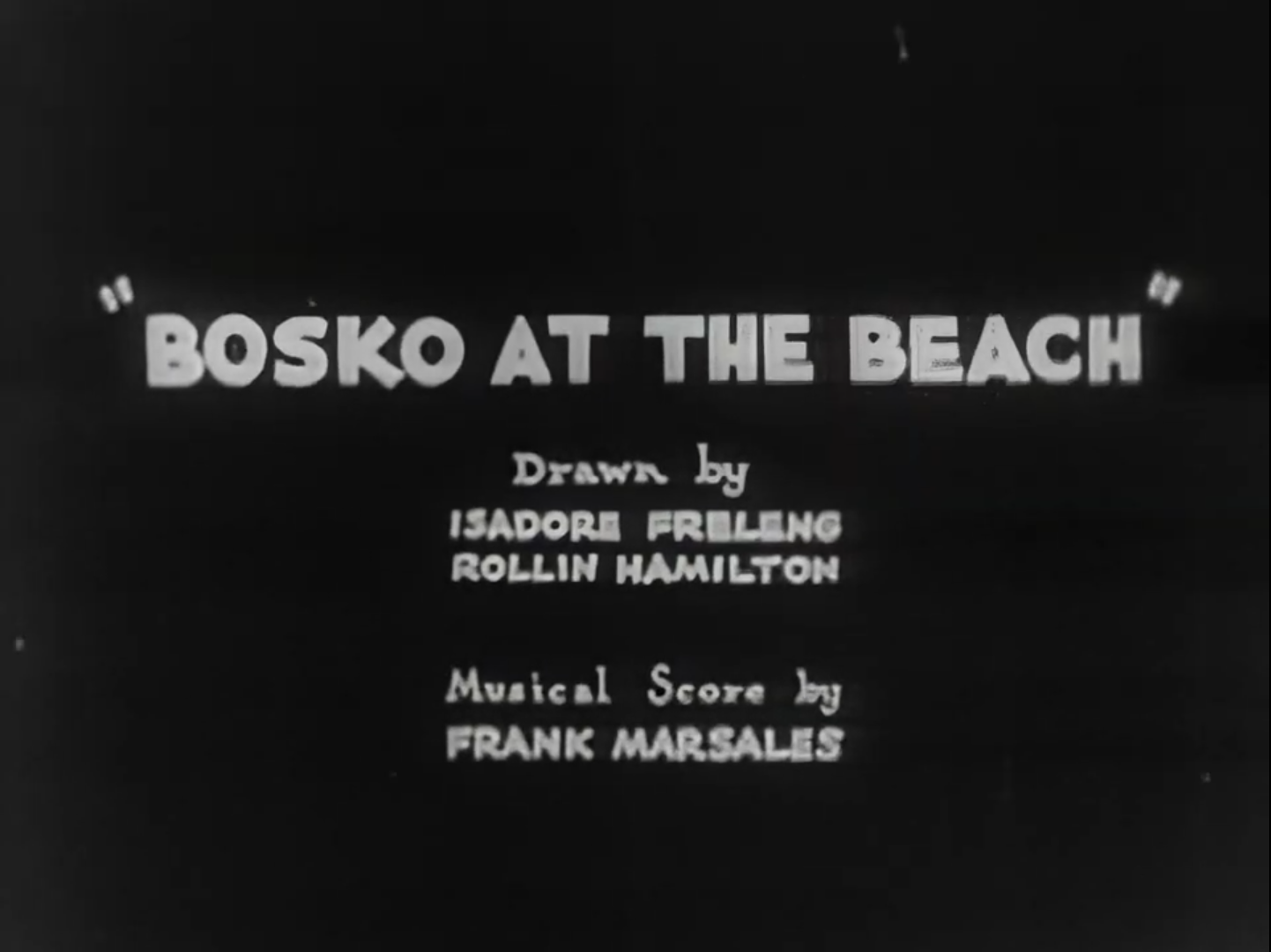
- Title card
- Directed by: Hugh Harman
- Produced by: Hugh Harman; Rudolf Ising; Leon Schlesinger
- Music by: Frank Marsales
- Animation by: Isadore Freleng; Rollin Hamilton
- Color process: Black and white
- Production companies: Harman-Ising Productions; Leon Schlesinger Productions
- Distributed by: Warner Bros. Pictures; The Vitaphone Corporation
- Release date: July 8, 1932
- Running time: 7 min
- Country: United States
- Language: English

Bosko at the Beach is a 1932 American animated comedy short film directed by Hugh Harman. It is the 23rd film in the Looney Tunes series featuring Bosko. It was released on July 8, 1932.

== Plot ==
Full short

Bosko sells anthropomorphic hot dogs near a beach. They dance and play skipping rope on the cart. An octopus and some seahorses are attracted by the sight, leaving the sea while the seahorses play with the octopus like a carousel.

Bruno's paw is stabbed by a thumbtack on the floor, which Bosko frees and teaches him to avoid. Honey and Wilber joyfully prance across the sand. As Honey sings with her guitar, Wilber tries to approach the sea, only to be scared by the comically high tide.

Bosko spots Honey, who brings him to a picnic to his delight. They happily sing "Ain't We Got Fun", only to be continuously interrupted by Bruno, which Bosko tries to distract with a tree branch to no avail, as Bruno keeps bringing back larger branches to the point he retrieves a giant log, which crushes all the food and slams a jar onto Bosko, ruining the outing.

To the duo's horror, they find Wilber to have been swept into the ocean. Bosko tries to swim to the rescue, failing the first time by landing flat on sand. As Bosko catches up to Wilber, Bruno retrieves an electric fan and ties his tail onto it and a log to form a makeshift speedboat. He successfully picks up Bosko and Wilber to their amazement.

== Reception ==
The Film Daily called it a "Good Cartoon", praising the climax for its amusing nature. Tom Bertino noted that the film was one of the better Looney Tunes from 1932 as it closely aped the formula of Mickey Mouse films during a period of decline in quality.
