= Big-Hearted Bosko =

1932 film

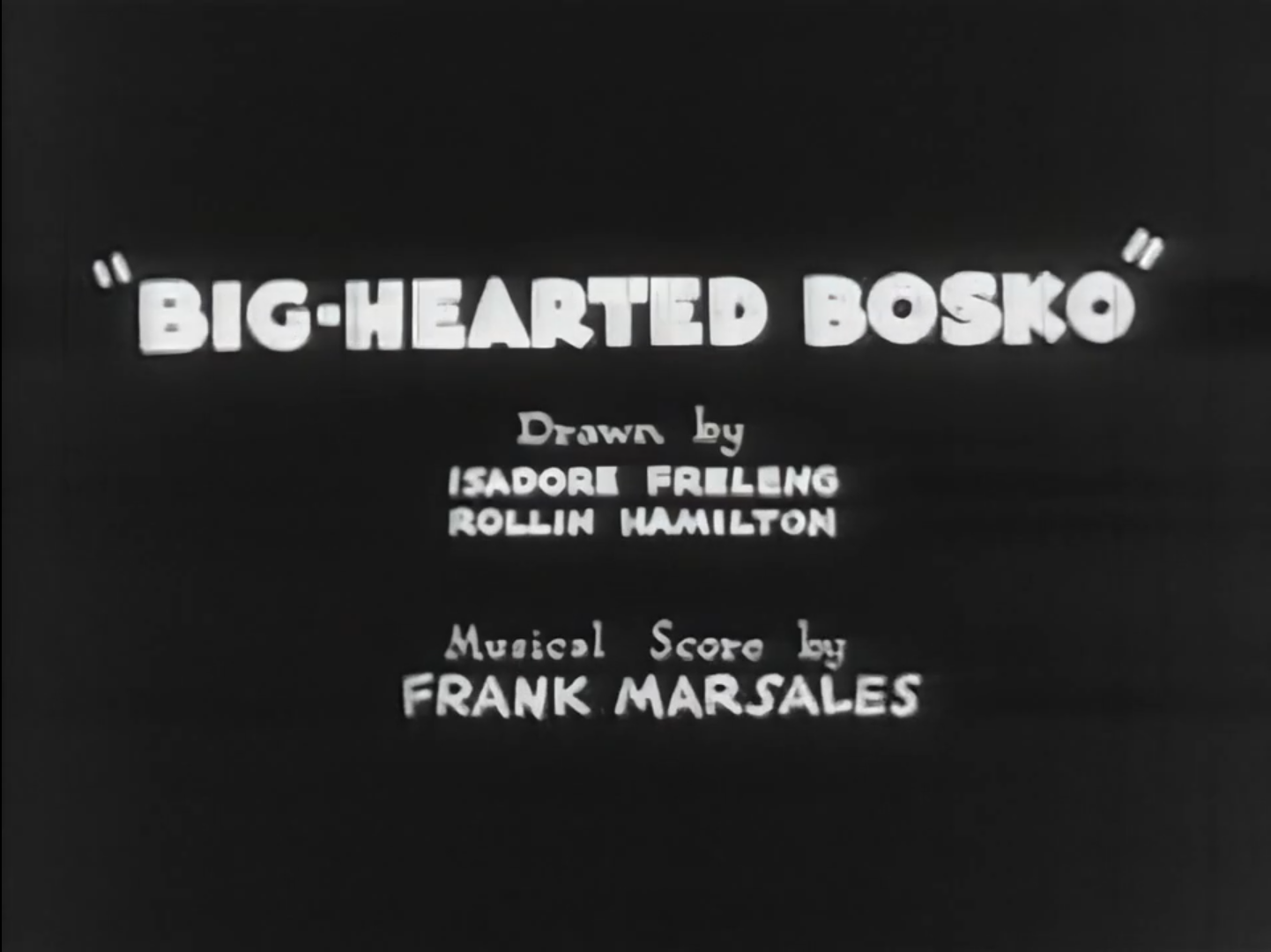
- Title card
- Directed by: Hugh Harman
- Produced by: Hugh Harman; Rudolf Ising; Leon Schlesinger
- Music by: Frank Marsales
- Animation by: Isadore Freleng; Rollin Hamilton
- Color process: Black-and-white
- Production companies: Harman-Ising Productions; Leon Schlesinger Productions
- Distributed by: Warner Bros. Pictures; The Vitaphone Corporation
- Release date: March 5, 1932
- Running time: 7 minutes
- Country: United States
- Language: English

Big-Hearted Bosko is a 1932 American animated short film directed by Hugh Harman. It is the nineteenth film in the Looney Tunes series featuring Bosko. It was released on March 5, 1932, although one source offers only an ambiguous release date of 1931–1932.

== Plot ==
Full short

Bosko goes ice skating while Bruno follows him. Bruno is encased in snow at one point, while Bosko narrowly misses numerous holes and jumps across ice to avoid falling into the lake in graceful fashion. Bruno falls into the lake and calls for help, only to emerge from a log when Bosko worries about him, much to Bosko's chagrin. Bruno spots a basket with noises coming out from it, frantically calling for Bosko, who is delighted to find a baby in it and takes him home.

Back home, Bruno rocks the baby in his cradle as Bosko plays a violin, which fails to calm the baby down. Frustrated, Bruno storms off, mistakenly sitting on the hot stove, lighting his buttocks on fire as he flees in agony until he finds a bucket of water. The baby mocks him much to Bosko's chagrin. Bosko switches to fife, playing "The Girl I Left Behind" while Bruno plays the drum. Bosko then tries to comfort the baby, who complains in song. Bruno storms into the bathroom and his hit on the head by a cuckoo clock. Bosko finally decides to play the piano and makes humorous impressions of animals through shadowgraphy. He then dances around the house while Bruno dances the hula while wearing a lamp. Bosko startles a still-alive chicken in the oven, then accidentally drops a bowl of two goldfish onto his head, much to the baby and Bruno's amusement.

== Reception ==
Motion Picture Herald called the film "clever enough, amusing enough."
