= Bosko =

Cartoon character

- Looney Tunes/Happy Harmonies character
- Bosko as he appears in an advertisement in 1932
- First appearance: Sinkin' in the Bathtub (1930)
- Created by: Hugh Harman
- Voiced by: C. G. Maxwell (1929–1930); Bernard B. Brown (1930–1932); Johnny Murray (1931–1935); Philip Hurlic (1936–1938); Eugene Jackson (1937); Don Messick (1990)

In-universe information
- Species: Human; Dog-like character (Tiny Toon Adventures)
- Significant other: Honey
- Nationality: American

Bosko is an animated cartoon character created by animator Hugh Harman. Bosko was the first recurring character in Leon Schlesinger's Looney Tunes series and was the star of 39 shorts released by Warner Bros. Pictures; after Harman and Rudolf Ising left Warner Bros. with Bosko in 1933, he appeared in 9 Happy Harmonies shorts released by Metro-Goldwyn-Mayer as its only recurring character. He was voiced by C. G. Maxwell, Bernard B. Brown, Johnny Murray, Philip Hurlic, and Eugene Jackson during the 1920s and 1930s and once by Don Messick during the 1990s. The character and the Looney Tunes-era films are owned by Turner Entertainment Co. through separate acquisitions; the latter have mostly fallen into the public domain due to their copyrights not being renewed after rights disputes, though the renewed films were returned to Warner Bros. Pictures.

== Creation and proof-of-concept film ==
A proof-of-concept film produced by Harman and Ising in 1929 to demonstrate Bosko, marketed as "Bosko, the Talk-Ink Kid".

In the mid-1920s, Hugh Harman and Rudolf Ising worked for Charles Mintz's Winkler Pictures on Walt Disney's Alice Comedies and Oswald the Lucky Rabbit series. The two animators created Bosko in 1927 to capitalize on the recent success of talkies in the motion picture industry. They began thinking about making a sound cartoon with Bosko in 1928 even prior to their departure from Disney. Harman made drawings of the new character and registered it with the U.S. Copyright Office on January 3, 1928. The character was registered as a "Negro boy" under the name of Bosko.

Before Harman and Ising could pitch Bosko to Winkler, Disney and Ub Iwerks had left the studio, and a failed attempt to take over the Oswald series led to them being evicted by Universal's Carl Laemmle in favor of Walter Lantz. In April 1929, they left Winkler and founded Harman-Ising Productions to market their new cartoon character. In May 1929, they produced a proof-of-concept film, similar to Max Fleischer's Out of the Inkwell cartoons, that showcased their ability to animate soundtrack-synchronized speech and dancing. The film opens with live action footage of Ising at a drafting table. After he draws Bosko on the page, the character springs to life, talks, sings, dances, and plays the piano. Ising returns Bosko to the inkwell, ending the film. The proof-of-concept film was a landmark in animation history for being the first cartoon to predominantly feature synchronized speech, though Fleischer Studios' Song Car-Tune My Old Kentucky Home was the first cartoon to contain animated dialogue a few years earlier. This cartoon set Harman and Ising "apart from early Disney sound cartoons because it emphasized not music but dialogue." To animate the film, Harman and Ising poached their colleagues Isadore Freleng and Rollin Hamilton respectively from Winkler and Lantz's studio. It was marketed under the title "Bosko, the Talk-Ink Kid" to various people by Harman and Ising until Leon Schlesinger offered them a contract to produce a series of cartoons for Warner Bros. Pictures. The test film was accidentally bundled with Sunset Productions' catalogue of Warner shorts and was never acknowledged until seventy years later, in 2000, as part of Cartoon Network's special ToonHeads: The Lost Cartoons, a compilation special of rare material from the WB/Turner archives.

In his book, Of Mice and Magic, Leonard Maltin states that this early version of Bosko

was in fact a cartoonized version of a young black boy... he spoke in a Southern Negro dialect... in subsequent films this characterization was eschewed, or perhaps forgotten. This could be called sloppiness on the part of Harman and Ising, but it also indicates the uncertain nature of the character itself.

== Bosko and Looney Tunes ==
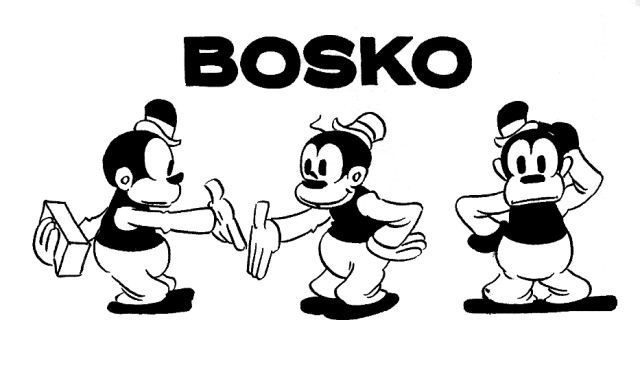
Model sheet of Bosko drawn by Hugh Harman in 1928

Schlesinger saw the Harman-Ising test film and signed the animators to produce cartoons at their studio for him to sell to Warner Bros. Bosko became the star vehicle for the studio's new Looney Tunes cartoon series. Bosko wore long pants and a derby hat, and he had a girlfriend named Honey and a dog named Bruno. He was also sometimes accompanied by Honey's humanized cat ward named Wilber and an often antagonistic goat, particularly in early cartoons.

The role of Bosko was to serve as a cartoony version of Al Jolson in The Jazz Singer (1927). According to Ising, he was initially supposed to be an "inkspot sort of thing". He was not conceived as either a human or an animal, though behaving like a little boy. According to Leonard Maltin, Bosko was a cartoonized version of a young black boy who spoke a Southern dialect of African American Vernacular English. He cites as an example a phrase from Bosko's Holiday, said with an intermittent drawl: "I sho'done likes picnics." Bosko had a stock exclamatory reaction indicating his pleasure "Mmmm! Dat sho' is fine!" which became something of a catch phrase. In the later Looney Tunes shorts in which Bosko appeared, his accent was gone, instead using a falsetto voice. Consequently, his race became more ambiguous.

According to Terry Lindvall and Ben Fraser, Bosko and Honey "were the most balanced portrayals of blacks in cartoons to that point", comparing their portrayal to that of human versions of Mickey and Minnie Mouse. According to Tom Bertino, Harman and Ising never called attention to Bosko's racial status, and stayed clear of negative stereotypes involving dice and watermelon while presenting him as a likable protagonist. An exception to this was in Congo Jazz (1930), where Bosko was seen with a monkey and gorilla with similar facial expressions as a racially insensitive joke.

Following his debut in Sinkin' in the Bathtub, Bosko would go on to star in 39 animated short subjects. His cartoons are notable for their focus on music over plot (though there were exceptions, such as Bosko the Doughboy, in 1931). Harman and Ising were allowed production costs of up to $6,000 per cartoon. During the same period, Disney was spending around $10,000 per cartoon. The smaller budgets forced Harman and Ising to recycle footage much more often than Disney did. However, Harman and Ising had the distinct advantage of free access to Warner Bros.' large music library, lavish orchestras (like Abe Lyman's), and sound recording equipment, allowing the films to capitalize on popular music of the time. Disney, on the other hand, had no access to a music library and was forced to rely, for the most part, on public domain music.

== Bosko at MGM ==
In 1933, Harman and Ising terminated their contract with Warner Bros. over budget disputes with Schlesinger. Having learned from Walt Disney's experiences with Oswald the Lucky Rabbit, they made sure they retained all rights to Bosko and related characters, taking him with them at the time of their departure. The two found work with Metro-Goldwyn-Mayer where they launched the Happy Harmonies series. Bosko comic strips drawn by Robert Allen were syndicated by cartoonist and Harman's brother Fred Harman starting from 1934.

At first, Bosko appeared in his original design in two-strip Technicolor and some of the old animation from the Looney Tunes series was even reused in the Happy Harmonies that featured Bosko. However, after only two cartoons, the character was redesigned into an identifiable black boy, similar in appearance to Inki and Lil' Eightball, with an overactive imagination. This redesigned Bosko, named Little Ol' Bosko, only starred in seven negatively-received three-strip Technicolor cartoons before Harman and Ising discontinued the character. The career of the character ended for good when MGM fired Harman and Ising due to cost overruns in the films they produced. They were replaced by Fred Quimby, who later hired Harman and Ising back, though Bosko did not make any appearances in subsequent MGM subjects they produced. Harman was sued by MGM in 1946 after selling prints of Happy Harmonies cartoons, including Bosko's cartoons to external companies for home and non-theatrical distribution, having retained the films' negatives and believing he owned the rights to the films.

== Bosko on television ==
Bosko cartoons were packaged with other Looney Tunes and Merrie Melodies, to be broadcast in various television markets in the 1950s. For instance, "Skipper Frank" (Frank Herman), showed Bosko, along with Buddy, on Cartoon Carousel, his hour-long afterschool cartoon program on KTLA-TV (Channel 5) in Los Angeles. Bosko cartoons were later aired on Nickelodeon as part of the network's Looney Tunes program beginning in 1988 and ending in 1992, when the network pulled all black-and-white shorts out of rotation to make room for more recent color cartoons featuring more popular Looney Tunes characters. Since then, no full Bosko cartoon has been shown on television due to their "ethnic offensiveness".

Bosko appeared in a 1990 episode of the television series Tiny Toon Adventures titled "Fields of Honey". In a parody of the then-current film Field of Dreams, a mysterious voice leads Babs Bunny to build a theater that shows nothing but cartoons of Bosko's girlfriend Honey, after being told about Honey (voiced by B. J. Ward) by the Acme Looniversity's mysterious vaultkeeper (voiced by Don Messick). Babs does so, and the resulting audience laughter rejuvenates the aged and ailing Honey. The laughter also rejuvenates the vaultkeeper, who is revealed to be none other than Bosko himself as well as the source of the voice. The cartoon depicts Bosko and Honey as dog-like talking animals similar to the lead characters of the later television series Animaniacs, presumably so as not to offend viewers with the original black-face characterizations.

The character is also seen in a portrait in the 1996 film Space Jam, this time in his original form. He also appears in his original form in the Animaniacs cartoon "The Girl with the Googily Goop", in which he is seen parking his car. Five episodes of Futurama featured clips from three Looney Tunes (pre-1934) Bosko cartoons in the opening sequence: Bosko Shipwrecked!, Box Car Blues, and Congo Jazz. The opening to the Futurama episode "Bendless Love" featured a clip from the Happy Harmonies cartoon Little Ol' Bosko in Bagdad in black-and-white.

== Home media ==
The majority of the Bosko cartoons are available on VHS and DVD in the Uncensored Bosko series from Bosko Video. In 2003, Warner Home Video officially released the proof-of-concept film "Bosko, the Talk-Ink Kid" as an unrestored extra on the fourth disc of the Looney Tunes Golden Collection: Volume 1 DVD box set. The second disc of Looney Tunes Golden Collection: Volume 3 (released in 2005) includes the first Looney Tunes short Sinkin' in the Bathtub (which originally introduced Bosko and Honey to audiences in 1930) as an unrestored extra. Looney Tunes Golden Collection: Volume 6 (released in 2008) includes six Bosko cartoons in a restored form: Congo Jazz (on disc 3), The Booze Hangs High (on disc 3), Bosko the Doughboy (on disc 2), Ride Him, Bosko! (on disc 3), Bosko in Person (on disc 3), and Bosko's Picture Show (on disc 3). The third disc of the Looney Tunes Platinum Collection: Volume 2 Blu-ray set (released in 2012) includes the aforementioned "Bosko, the Talk-Ink Kid" and Sinkin' in the Bathtub as unrestored extras. In 2026, the Warner Archive Collection released a restored version of Sinkin' in the Bathtub on the first disc of the Looney Tunes Collector's Vault: Volume 3 Blu-ray set.

== Copyright status ==
All Bosko cartoons subject to copyright remain owned by Warner Bros., but the majority of the Bosko cartoons originally released from 1930 to 1932 have fallen into the public domain. Warner Bros. also owns the Happy Harmonies cartoons starring Bosko through Turner Entertainment Co., as Ted Turner bought the pre-May 1986 MGM library.

== Filmography ==
All films are directed by Hugh Harman, with Rudolf Ising directing the 1930 cartoons.

| Year | Title | Film (if in the public domain) |
|---|---|---|
| 1930 | Sinkin' in the Bathtub | |
| 1930 | Congo Jazz | |
| 1930 | Hold Anything | |
| 1930 | The Booze Hangs High | |
| 1930 | Box Car Blues | |
| 1931 | Big Man from the North | |
| 1931 | Ain't Nature Grand! | |
| 1931 | Ups 'n Downs | |
| 1931 | Dumb Patrol | |
| 1931 | Yodeling Yokels | |
| 1931 | Bosko's Holiday | |
| 1931 | The Tree's Knees | |
| 1931 | Bosko Shipwrecked! | |
| 1931 | Bosko the Doughboy | |
| 1931 | Bosko's Soda Fountain | |
| 1931 | Bosko's Fox Hunt | |
| 1932 | Bosko at the Zoo | |
| 1932 | Battling Bosko | |
| 1932 | Big-Hearted Bosko | |
| 1932 | Bosko's Party | |
| 1932 | Bosko and Bruno | |
| 1932 | Bosko's Dog Race | |
| 1932 | Bosko at the Beach | |
| 1932 | Bosko's Store | |
| 1932 | Bosko the Lumberjack | |
| 1932 | Ride Him, Bosko! | Copyright renewed |
| 1932 | Bosko the Drawback | Copyright renewed |
| 1932 | Bosko's Dizzy Date | Copyright renewed, though an earlier version, Bosko and Honey, was never registered. Bosko and Honey |
| 1932 | Bosko's Woodland Daze | Copyright renewed |
| 1933 | Bosko in Dutch | Copyright renewed |
| 1933 | Bosko in Person | Copyright renewed |
| 1933 | Bosko the Speed King | Copyright renewed |
| 1933 | Bosko's Knight-Mare | Copyright renewed |
| 1933 | Bosko the Sheep-Herder | Copyright renewed |
| 1933 | Beau Bosko | Copyright renewed |
| 1933 | Bosko's Mechanical Man | Copyright renewed |
| 1933 | Bosko the Musketeer | Copyright renewed |
| 1933 | Bosko's Picture Show | Copyright renewed |
| 1934 | Bosko's Parlor Pranks | Copyright renewed |
| 1935 | Hey-Hey Fever | Copyright renewed |
| 1935 | Run Sheep, Run! | Copyright renewed |
| 1936 | The Old House | Copyright renewed |
| 1937 | Circus Daze | Copyright renewed |
| 1937 | Bosko's Easter Eggs | Copyright renewed |
| 1937 | Little Ol' Bosko and the Pirates | Copyright renewed |
| 1937 | Little Ol' Bosko and the Cannibals | Copyright renewed |
| 1938 | Little Ol' Bosko in Bagdad | Copyright renewed |

== Sources ==
- Cohen, Karl F. (2004), "Racism and Resistance: Stereotypes in Animation", Forbidden Animation: Censored Cartoons and Blacklisted Animators in America, McFarland & Company, ISBN 978-0786420322
- Lindvall, Terry; Fraser, Ben (1998), "Darker Shades of Animation: African-American Images in the Warner Bros. Cartoon", in Sandler, Kevin S. (ed.), Reading the Rabbit: Explorations in Warner Bros. Animation, Rutgers University Press, ISBN 978-0813525389
