= Bosko's Dog Race =

1932 film

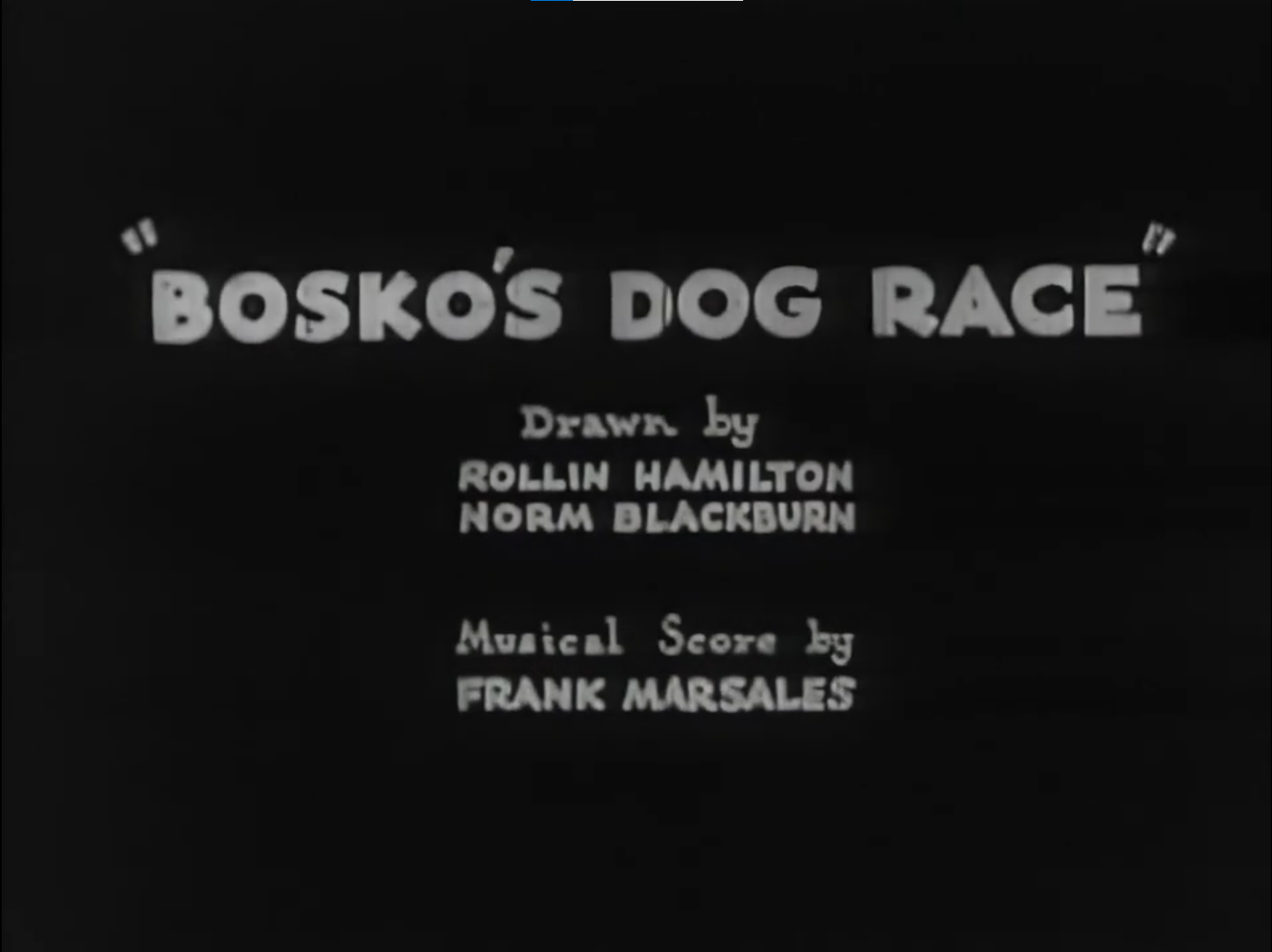
- Title card
- Directed by: Hugh Harman
- Produced by: Hugh Harman; Rudolf Ising; Leon Schlesinger
- Music by: Frank Marsales
- Animation by: Rollin Hamilton; Norm Blackburn
- Production companies: Harman-Ising Productions; Leon Schlesinger Productions
- Distributed by: Warner Bros. Pictures; The Vitaphone Corporation
- Release date: June 25, 1932
- Running time: 7 min
- Country: United States
- Language: English

Bosko's Dog Race is a 1932 American animated comedy short film directed by Hugh Harman. It is the 22nd film in the Looney Tunes series featuring Bosko. It was released on June 25, 1932.

== Plot ==
Full short

Bosko and Bruno fry an egg over an open fire. A squirrel catches the egg and eats it, angering them as they give chase. A misfire from Bosko's shotgun launches him into the pan on the fire, burning his buttocks. The squirrel escapes through a hole on a log floating on a lake, confusing Bruno and causing him to fall into the water, much to Bosko's amusement.

Bosko and Bruno find a poster for a dog race with a $5000 reward. To Bruno's horror, Bosko is tempted by the reward and demands that he win. Bosko then forces Bruno to partake in an arduous training regimen. Honey passes by and asks Bosko about the race, only for Bruno's obesity to be mocked.

On the big day, Bruno lags behind the competition as he is too busy sniffing for animals, his duty as a hunting dog. He struggles to catch up to the other dogs, led by a greyhound. To Bosko's horror, Bruno spots the squirrel and leaves the racecourse to chase it. He hits a bee hive and is chased by the bees in retaliation. As he returns to the racecourse, the bees continuously sting him, giving him an adrenaline rush as he easily surpasses the other dogs and wins the race.
