= Bosko Shipwrecked! =

1931 film by Hugh Harman

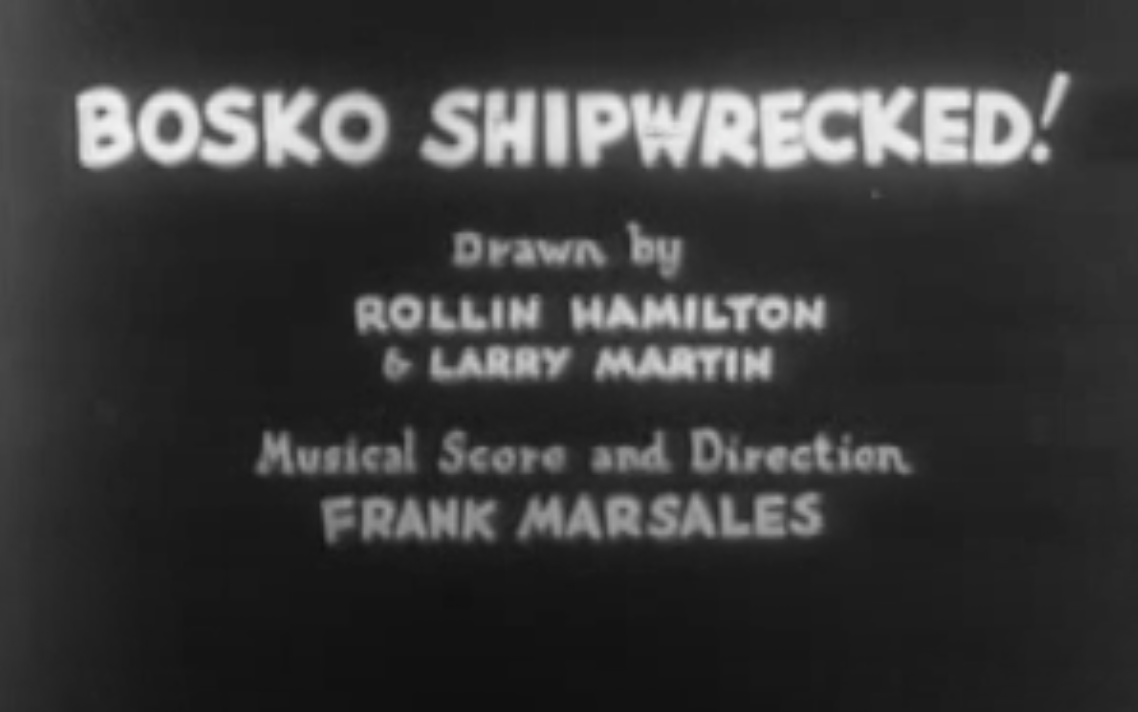
- Title card
- Directed by: Hugh Harman
- Produced by: Hugh Harman; Rudolf Ising; Leon Schlesinger
- Starring: Bernard B. Brown (uncredited)
- Music by: Frank Marsales
- Animation by: Rollin Hamilton; Larry Martin
- Color process: Black and white
- Production companies: Harman-Ising Productions; Leon Schlesinger Productions
- Distributed by: Warner Bros. Pictures; The Vitaphone Corporation
- Release date: September 5, 1931
- Running time: 6:51
- Country: United States
- Language: English

Bosko Shipwrecked! is a 1931 American animated comedy film. It is the thirteenth film in the Looney Tunes series featuring Bosko. It was released on September 5, 1931. (Note: Archived from a September 10 article, this is based on the fact that new cartoon shorts would premiere in theaters on Saturdays.) It is directed by Hugh Harman, as well as the first short to not be directed or co-directed by Rudolf Ising. The film score was composed by Frank Marsales.

== Plot ==
Full short

Bosko, the captain of a ship, struggles to keep it afloat during a storm. This results in a crewmate being involuntarily pantsed and Bosko's groin being hit by the wheel. The ship sinks and Bosko's crewmate is implied to have drowned.

Bosko washes up on a deserted island. Two monkeys steal his hat and fight over ownership, before one wears it and performs a stereotypical black caricature dance, causing an egg on a nest to fall on Bosko, waking him up. A parrot mockingly informs him to be doomed repeatedly, only to fall into a log that strips him of his plumage which he angrily wears. Bosko mocks him, only to be chased by a lion. A crocodile tries to eat the lion, with Bosko tying the lion's tail on a tree to incapacitate them both. Bosko finds a boat and rows across the water, accidentally anchoring a hippo resembling a rock. He comes upon a group of cannibals, which bring him to their leader. After failing to shoot the leader with his pistol, he escapes and tries to row to safety. He is eaten by a rhino, only to reemerge from its body safely as the rhino swims away.
