= Hold Anything =

1930 film

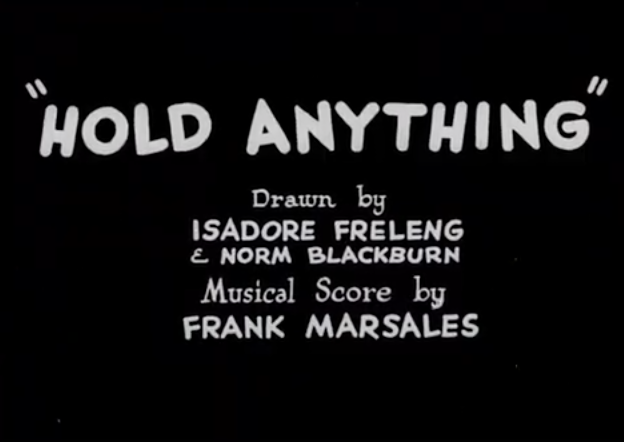
- Title card
- Directed by: Hugh Harman; Rudolf Ising
- Produced by: Hugh Harman; Rudolf Ising
- Starring: Bernard B. Brown; Rochelle Hudson (both uncredited)
- Music by: Frank Marsales
- Animation by: Isadore Freleng; Norm Blackburn
- Color process: Black-and-white
- Production company: Harman-Ising Productions
- Distributed by: Warner Bros. Pictures; The Vitaphone Corporation
- Release date: August 9, 1930; (earliest known date)
- Running time: 6:22
- Language: English

Hold Anything is a 1930 American comedy short film directed by Hugh Harman and Rudolf Ising. It is the third film in the Looney Tunes series featuring Bosko. It was released as early as August 9, 1930. (Note: Archived from an August 15 article, this is based on the fact that new cartoon shorts would premiere in theaters on Saturdays.) It is loosely based on the lost film Hold Everything, one of whose songs, "Don't Hold Everything", features prominently in the cartoon. It was animated by Isadore "Friz" Freleng and Norman Blackburn.

== Plot ==
Full short

Bosko works on a construction site with several mice resembling Mickey Mouse, playing music while drilling screws. As the mice march to the beat of the music, a mouse zones off and is left behind, only to fall onto a saw. Bosko toys with the mouse on the saw and temporarily decapitates it, much to its chagrin. The mouse is unintentionally eaten by a nearby goat, both of which unwillingly lift Bosko up a metal beam. Bosko spots his girlfriend, Honey, working in a nearby office building. After some brief flirtation, Bosko jumps down into Honey's office, pulls out a piece of sheet music, places it in Honey's typewriter, and begins playing "Don't Hold Everything" on the typewriter like a piano. The goat, tired of Bosko's antics, leaves his post and attempts to eat a steam engine, inflating and beginning to float upward. Bosko reaches out the window and begins playing the goat like a calliope. The goat begins to float away, and as Bosko hangs on for his life, he accidentally grabs onto a set of udders and gets sprayed with milk, distracting him enough to lose his grip and fall onto a set of bricks. Bosko inexplicably divides into six miniature Boskos and begins playing the bricks as a xylophone before he reforms to his usual self and the cartoon irises out.
