= Ride Him, Bosko! =

1932 film by Hugh Harman

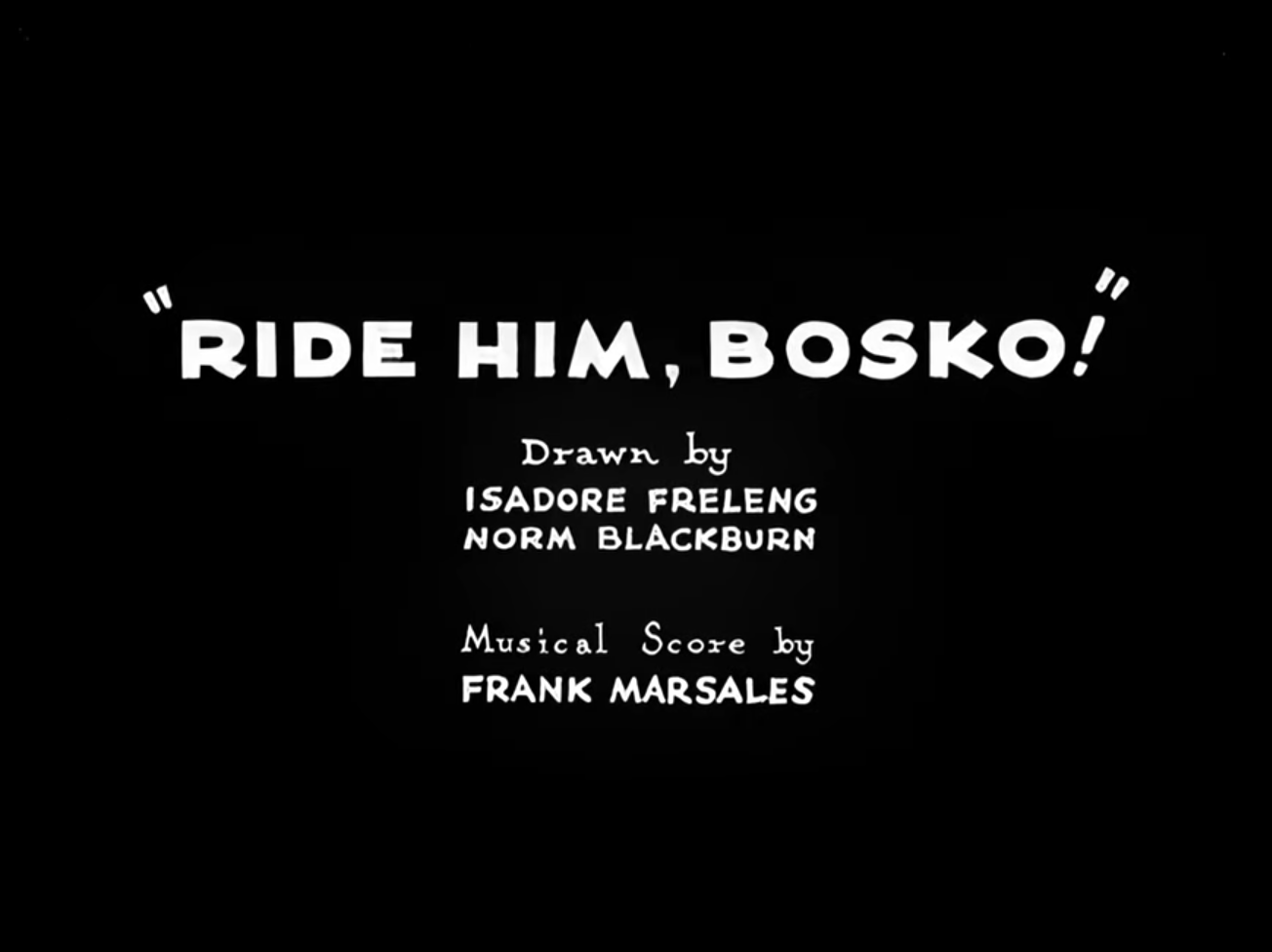
- Title card
- Directed by: Hugh Harman
- Produced by: Hugh Harman; Rudolf Ising; Leon Schlesinger
- Starring: Johnny Murray; Rudolf Ising
- Music by: Frank Marsales
- Animation by: Isadore Freleng; Norm Blackburn
- Color process: Black-and-white
- Production companies: Harman-Ising Productions; Leon Schlesinger Productions
- Distributed by: Warner Bros. Pictures; The Vitaphone Corporation
- Release date: September 17, 1932
- Running time: 7 minutes
- Country: United States
- Language: English

Ride Him, Bosko! is a 1932 American Western animated short film directed by Hugh Harman. It is the 26th film in the Looney Tunes series featuring Bosko. It was released on September 17, 1932. It is the earliest-released cartoon distributed by Warner Bros. Pictures to remain under copyright, as it was renewed on January 11, 1961, while earlier 1932 cartoons were neglected by then-owner, Warner Bros. subsidiary Sunset Productions; it will lapse into the public domain on January 1, 2028.

== Plot ==
One night, Bosko rides home on an old horse while singing. He encounters a boulder, which he begrudgingly pushes the unresponsive horse across. At a nearby saloon, a gunfight occurs while a passing pig is hit on the head with a bottle of booze and is hence incapacitated. A passing dachshund is shot until he shrinks.

Bosko enters the saloon opposite to the one seen. He is shot by the patrons, who welcome him after recognizing his survival. While Bosko dances, Goopy Geer plays on the piano, only to light himself on fire and do an effeminate impression. Bosko hijacks the piano and plays it. A patron plays cards, with the figures on the cards singing along to Bosko's song. The Joker card, featuring a jester Goopy Geer, also joins in but is shot by the patron.

Elsewhere, Honey travels in a carriage, which shakes violently to her chagrin. A group of bandits spot the carriage and attempts to attack it, only for the leader to be hit by the speeding carriage. As the bandit gives chase, the driver speeds up and drops Honey's clothes, which then escape on their own from the impeding gunfire. The driver is thrown out of the carriage onto a cactus, landing on a bull skeleton who comes to life and brings him to the saloon.

The driver arrives at the saloon and warns Bosko, who accidentally mounts a fence before mounting his horse, who by this point has rejuvenated and is able to leap over the boulders. The camera pans to Harman-Ising Productions, where director Hugh Harman, producer Rudolf Ising and animator Norm Blackburn humorously watch the action in real time as Harman directs it. Blackburn suggests that the trio go home, which Harman and Ising oblige, leading Bosko to helplessly sit in the middle of the desert as the action slows to a crawl.

Although the cartoon ends on a cliffhanger, it is continued in Metro-Goldwyn-Mayer's Happy Harmonies cartoon Bosko's Parlor Pranks, where Bosko eventually gets to rescue Honey from the bandits in a flashback.

== Reception ==
The Film Daily called it a "Good Animated", noting its ending to be a "novel finishing touch".

Steve Schneider's That's All, Folks! The Art of Warner Bros. Animation cites Ride Him, Bosko! as an example of the studio's "bare-bones elementary level" of quality, saying that the animators "simply pack it in for the night — and perhaps provide a comment on their own commitment to ingenuity."

== Home media ==
Ride Him, Bosko! is available on disc 3 of the Looney Tunes Golden Collection: Volume 6 DVD set.
