= Thomas McKimson =

American animator (1907–1998)

- Born: March 5, 1907; Denver, Colorado, U.S.
- Died: February 14, 1998 (aged 90); West Los Angeles, California, U.S.
- Other name: Tom McKimson
- Occupations: Animator; Comic book artist
- Spouse: Ernestine McKimson
- Children: 3

Thomas Jacob McKimson (March 5, 1907 – February 14, 1998) was an American animator and comic book artist, best known for his work at the Warner Bros. Cartoons studio. He was the older brother of animators Robert and Charles McKimson.

Tom McKimson was born in Denver, Colorado, but relocated to Los Angeles with his family in the 1920s. He attended Otis Art Institute (now called Otis College of Art and Design) in the 1920s. He began his career in animation in 1929, when he joined the Walt Disney Studio, becoming an assistant to animator Norm Ferguson. He left Disney a year later to work briefly for Romer Grey, then joined Harman-Ising Studios around 1932. After Hugh Harman and Rudolf Ising left Warner Bros. for MGM, McKimson became a member of Bob Clampett's animation unit, where he is credited as a layout artist and the original design for Tweety Bird. McKimson also provided layout designs for Arthur Davis's unit after he took over Clampett's unit by 1946.

During his time at Warner Bros., McKimson also worked for Dell Comics, providing illustrations for the Bugs Bunny and Road Runner comic books. McKimson also illustrated the Roy Rogers daily comic strip from 1949 to 1953 in collaboration with his brother Charles and artist Pete Alvarado, using the collective pseudonym "Al McKimson." He left Warners in 1947 when Don Smith replaced him as layout artist for Davis' unit. He would become an art director for Dell's parent company Western Publishing, where he remained until his retirement in 1972.

McKimson was active in the Masonic fraternity. He was the Master of Melrose Lodge No. 355 in Hollywood in 1954 and a founding member of Riviera Lodge No. 780 in Pacific Palisades, California in 1956, and later an Inspector and the Grand Tyler of the Grand Lodge of California. He was also a polo enthusiast, playing on the same team as Walter Lantz animator Ray Abrams.

McKimson died on Valentine's Day, 1998 in West Los Angeles at the age of 90, less than a month before his 91st birthday.
