= C. G. Maxwell =

American animator and voice actor (1902–1987)

- Born: Carman Griffin Maxwell; December 27, 1902; Siloam Springs, Arkansas, U.S.
- Died: September 22, 1987 (aged 84); Ojai, California, U.S.
- Occupation: Animator
- Years active: 1922–1956

Carman Griffin "Max" Maxwell (December 27, 1902 – September 22, 1987), known professionally as C. G. Maxwell, was an American animator and voice actor.

Maxwell was born in Siloam Springs, Arkansas, and later moved to Kansas City, Missouri. He began his career with Walt Disney at the Laugh-O-Gram Studio where Maxwell, along with Hugh Harman, Rudolf Ising, and Friz Freleng, was part of the unit that eventually broke away from Disney to form the nucleus of what later became the Warner Bros. animation studio (under contract with Leon Schlesinger). Before going to Harman-Ising Productions, he animated for Oswald the Lucky Rabbit for Disney and Winkler Pictures, with his Disney alumni.

Besides animating for Harman-Ising, Maxwell also performed the voice of their most famous creation, Bosko. Maxwell was also later a production manager in the Metro-Goldwyn-Mayer cartoon department, working there as late as 1956.
