= Johnny Murray (voice actor) =

American voice actor (1904–1956)

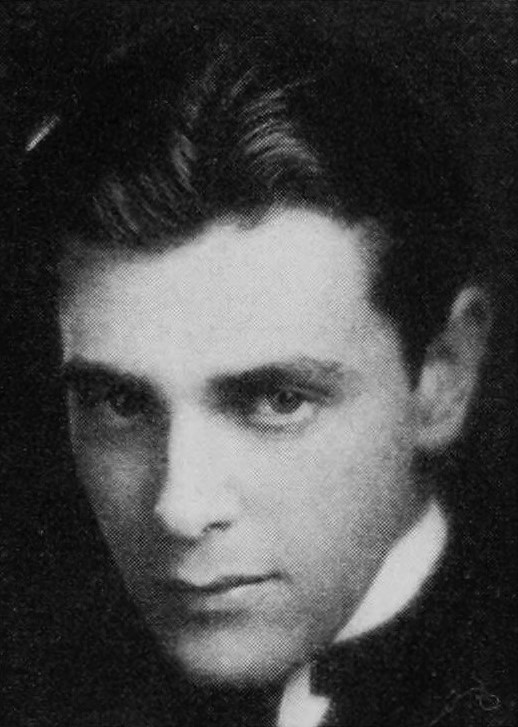
- Murray in 1929
- Born: John James Murray; June 12, 1904; New York City, New York
- Died: August 1, 1956 (aged 52); Los Angeles, California
- Resting place: Holy Cross Cemetery, Culver City, California
- Occupation: Voice actor
- Years active: 1929–1941

John James Murray (June 12, 1904 – August 1, 1956) was an American voice actor. In 1929, he was under a contract with First National Pictures to sing for Richard Barthelmess in his films; he provided Barthelmess's voice in Weary River. He is best remembered for his role as Bosko, the first star of the Looney Tunes series by Warner Bros. Pictures, from 1931's Bosko the Doughboy to 1933's Bosko's Picture Show. The latter is infamous for perhaps containing the first cartoon depiction of Adolf Hitler, and possibly of being among the first, if not first, widely distributed films that contain verbal usage of the f-bomb.
