= Bosko's Parlor Pranks =

1934 film by Hugh Harman

- Title card
- Directed by: Hugh Harman
- Produced by: Hugh Harman; Rudolf Ising
- Music by: Scott Bradley
- Color process: Technicolor
- Production companies: Metro-Goldwyn-Mayer; Harman-Ising Productions
- Distributed by: Loew's, Inc.
- Release date: November 24, 1934
- Running time: 8 minutes
- Country: United States
- Language: English

Bosko's Parlor Pranks is a 1934 American animated comedy short film directed by Hugh Harman. The fourth film in the Happy Harmonies series, it is the 39th cartoon to star Bosko, the first Bosko cartoon produced in color (two-strip Technicolor), and the first made at MGM following the Harman-Ising studio ending its deal to produce Looney Tunes and Merrie Melodies for Warner Bros. Pictures and Leon Schlesinger. Warner Bros. would later own Happy Harmonies and the MGM cartoon studio through its Turner Entertainment Co. banner.

In this cartoon, Bosko appears with the same character design as in his Warner Bros. cartoons, with most of the animation being reused from said films. After Hey-Hey Fever, Bosko's second MGM cartoon, he was redesigned into a more realistic caricature of an African-American boy. Most of the animation in this cartoon is reused from the Looney Tunes shorts in which Bosko appeared.

== Plot ==
Bosko walks to Honey's house with his dog Bruno. Meanwhile, Honey teaches Wilber how to play the piano while he demands an ice cream cone. Bruno nosily sniffs the front porch until he is scolded by his owner, causing him to blush. Bosko then proceeds to slide-step to Honey's door and ring her doorbell. Upon entering, Bosko and Honey perform a musical number before Honey leaves to buy an ice cream cone for Wilber.

To entertain Wilber, Bosko picks up a book about the Knights of the Round Table, claiming to be one of them, as well as claiming to be a skilled boxer who defeated the world's boxing champion in a heated bout, which Wilber does not fall for. Bosko then walks to the piano, takes a balloon from his pants pocket, blows it, and sets it on his nose, making him resemble Jimmy Durante. He then impersonates Durante as he plays the piano, which irritates Wilber, to his disgust. He then sings a song about how he rescued Honey from a runaway vehicle as a cowboy (an original sequel to Ride Him, Bosko!), but Wilber's constant complaints about his ice cream cone finally start getting to his nerves. As Honey skips home carrying Wilber's ice cream cone, Bosko tells the story about his experiences as a musketeer, only to accidentally hit the ice cream cone Honey bought and cause it to fall on him, much to Honey's amusement.
