= Old House =

The Old House, Ye Olde House, Oldhouse, Oldehouse, Olden House, Oldenhouse, Ol' House, Ole House, Olhouse, may refer to:

== Places ==
- Old House, a building in the village of Sankt Anton am Arlberg, Tyrol, Austria
- Old House, Pirot, Serbia, former house of the Hristić family

=== UK ===
- Ye Olde House, Kincardine-On-Forth, Tulliallan, Fife, Scotland, UK; see List of listed buildings in Tulliallan, Fife

==== England ====
- The Old House, Harrietsham, a well-preserved former farmhouse in England, UK
- Old House, Hereford, a house, now a museum, in Hereford, England, UK
- The Old House, Ightham Common, a pub in Kent, England, UK
- The Olde House, Histon, South Cambridgeshire, Cambridgeshire, England, UK; one of the Grade II* listed buildings in South Cambridgeshire
- The Olde House and Grange, Eyam, Derbyshire Dales, Derbyshire, England, UK; one of the listed buildings in Eyam
- The Olde House, Tillingham, Dengie, Maldon, Essex, England, UK
- The Old House, a house in the parish of Lydbrook, Gloucestershire, England, UK
- Ye Old House, Churchdown, Gloucestershire, England, UK
- The Olde House, Oad Street, Kent, England, UK
- Olde House, Rearsby, Charmwood, Leicestershire, England, UK
- Ye Olde House, Byth, Nottingham, England, UK; one of the listed buildings in Blyth, Nottinghamshire
- Ye Olde House, Worfield, Shropshire, England, UK; one of the listed buildings in Worfield
- Ye Olde House and Bridge Cottage, Madeley, Newcastle-under-Lyme, Staffordshire, England, UK; one of the listed buildings in Madeley, Staffordshire
- Ye Olde House At Home, Broadwater, West Sussex, Sussex, England, UK
- The Olde House, Holme Valley, Kirklees, West Yorkshire, Yorkshire, England, UK; one of the listed buildings in Holme Valley (outer areas)

=== USA ===
- Old House (Quincy, Massachusetts) or Peacefield, a historic home of President Adams in Massachusetts, USA
- Olden House, Drumthwacket, Princeton, New Jersey, USA
- Old House (Cutchogue), a National Historic Landmark house in Suffolk County, New York, USA
- Old House, South Carolina, a community in Jasper County, SC, USA

== Other uses ==
- The Old House (fairy tale), an 1847 fairy tale by Hans Christian Andersen
- The Old House (film), a 1936 Happy Harmonies cartoon
- "Old House", a song by Nik Kershaw from You've Got to Laugh

== See also ==
- Dat ole Huus (That Ole House), Wilsede, Lower Saxony, Germany; a museum
- Dat ole Hus (That Ole House), Aukrug, Schleswig-Holstein, Germany; a museum
- This Old House (disambiguation)
- House (disambiguation)
- Old (disambiguation)
