= The Little Bantamweight =

1938 film by Rudolf Ising

- Directed by: Rudolf Ising (uncredited)
- Produced by: Hugh Harman; Rudolf Ising
- Music by: Scott Bradley
- Color process: Technicolor
- Production companies: Metro-Goldwyn-Mayer; Harman-Ising Productions
- Distributed by: Loew's, Inc.
- Release date: March 12, 1938
- Running time: 8 min
- Country: United States
- Language: English

The Little Bantamweight is a 1938 American animated short film directed by Rudolf Ising. It is not named as part of the Happy Harmonies series (though retroactively considered to be so). It is also the studio's last cartoon to not be initially outsourced to Walt Disney Productions, who contracted three cartoons for the Silly Symphonies series but only finished one.

== Plot ==
Eggbert the rooster reads a poster for a boxing competition for young chickens while his wife hatches her eggs. The rooster chicks prove to be talented fighters except for the runt of the group, who is cowardly, weak and lacks any enthusiasm related to boxing. He makes minimal progress over two weeks of training while his siblings see massive improvement.

The rooster brings his sons to the boxing competition, where he fails to anticipate his sons' lack of experience causing them to lose. The runt is forced to fight and realizes the brevity of the situation. He proves to be efficient in dodging attacks due to his small stature, agility and cunning. He hits the opponent once with a headbutt, but is knocked out until he accidentally consumes conveniently placed linament while unconscious. This doping causes him to become extremely aggressive and violent, gaining an unfair advantage as he beats the opponent senseless and is regardless given the award.
