= Little Ol' Bosko in Bagdad =

1938 film by Hugh Harman

- Directed by: Hugh Harman (uncredited)
- Produced by: Hugh Harman; Rudolf Ising
- Music by: Scott Bradley
- Color process: Technicolor
- Production companies: Metro-Goldwyn-Mayer; Harman-Ising Productions
- Distributed by: Loew's, Inc.
- Release date: January 1, 1938
- Running time: 10 min
- Country: United States
- Language: English

Little Ol' Bosko in Bagdad is a 1938 American animated short film directed by Hugh Harman. It is not named as part of the Happy Harmonies series (though retroactively considered to be so), a sequel to Little Ol' Bosko and the Cannibals (1937) and the 47th and final cartoon to star Bosko, who suffered a decline in popularity after his redesign and was retired after Harman and Rudolf Ising closed their studio.

== Plot ==
Bosko is instructed to bring cookies to his grandmother again at night. He is spooked by an owl and a frog. He disregards his mother's instructions to not daydream and imagines one of the Jazz Frogs being a genie emerging from his lamp, who brings him to Bagdad. They sing and dance before tempting him with fruit. They fail to force feed Bosko castor oil, allowing Bosko to gain an advantage. The frogs are grinded into powder by a treadmill, reverting to normal before Bosko blows up a frog with his trombone. Bosko wakes up and runs the way to his grandmother's house.
