= Little Ol' Bosko and the Cannibals =

1937 film by Hugh Harman

- Directed by: Hugh Harman (uncredited)
- Produced by: Hugh Harman; Rudolf Ising
- Music by: Scott Bradley
- Color process: Technicolor
- Production companies: Metro-Goldwyn-Mayer; Harman-Ising Productions
- Distributed by: Loew's, Inc.
- Release date: August 28, 1937
- Running time: 9 min
- Country: United States
- Language: English

Little Ol' Bosko and the Cannibals is a 1937 American animated short film directed by Hugh Harman. It is not named as part of the Happy Harmonies series (though retroactively considered to be so), the 46th cartoon to star Bosko and a sequel to Little Ol' Bosko and the Pirates (1937).

== Plot ==
Bosko is instructed to bring cookies to his grandmother again. He disregards his mother's instructions to not daydream and imagines the Jazz Frogs being cannibals who hunt him on the way. They sing and dance with Bosko before deciding to cook him. Bosko manages to gain an advantage and almost causes the cannibals' leader to fall into a pot of stew. He returns to reality and finds a harmless frog, who scares him into running to his grandmother's house.
