= Circus Daze =

1937 film by Hugh Harman

- Directed by: Hugh Harman (uncredited)
- Produced by: Hugh Harman; Rudolf Ising
- Music by: Scott Bradley
- Color process: Technicolor
- Production companies: Metro-Goldwyn-Mayer; Harman-Ising Productions
- Distributed by: Loew's, Inc.
- Release date: January 16, 1937
- Running time: 8 min
- Country: United States
- Language: English

Circus Daze is a 1937 American animated short film directed by Hugh Harman. It is the 27th film in the Happy Harmonies series and the 43rd cartoon to star Bosko.

== Plot ==
Bosko, Honey and Bruno go to a circus. Bruno is scolded for chasing a flea two monkeys fight over. He chases the flea again while Bosko and Honey attempt to retrieve Honey's balloon. Bosko flies over clowns playing music while trying to retrieve the balloon, ending up flying on a clown who plays a trombone while hooked to the balloon. Bruno earns the ire of a flea circus, running into a cannon where he is fired out. He lands on the clowns who start to scratch themselves. Bruno is knocked out by the trombone and falls while spreading fleas, causing a massive panic and stampede where even the animals succumb to the fleas. Bosko and Honey escape while Bruno is thrown out for causing the commotion.
