= The Hound and the Rabbit =

1937 film by Rudolf Ising

- Directed by: Rudolf Ising (uncredited)
- Produced by: Hugh Harman; Rudolf Ising
- Music by: Scott Bradley
- Color process: Technicolor
- Production companies: Metro-Goldwyn-Mayer; Harman-Ising Productions
- Distributed by: Loew's, Inc.
- Release date: May 29, 1937
- Running time: 7 min
- Country: United States
- Language: English

The Hound and the Hare is a 1937 American animated short film directed by Rudolf Ising. It is the only one-shot cartoon directed by Ising for MGM to not be named as part of the Happy Harmonies series (though retroactively considered to be so).

== Plot ==
A hunting dog chases a young rabbit who is hindered by his helmet. The rabbit is frightened once he is cornered, only to realize that the dog means no harm. They become fast friends despite a language barrier. The rabbit finds his friends playing American football, who are frightened by the dog's presence. The rabbit places his head in the dog's jaws to prove that the dog is of no harm. They play football while a fox walks nearby. Realizing the opportunity to hunt rabbits, the fox lures the dog away, but is goaded into playing football for the opposing team. The fox abducts all of the rabbits except for the rabbit who befriended the dog, who is deemed too small. The rabbit calls for the dog, who was loafing nearby, to rescue the rabbits. The dog fights the fox while the rabbit frees his friends. The rabbits celebrate with the dog.
