= The Early Bird and the Worm =

1936 film by Rudolf Ising

- Directed by: Rudolf Ising
- Produced by: Hugh Harman; Rudolf Ising
- Music by: Scott Bradley
- Color process: Technicolor
- Production companies: Metro-Goldwyn-Mayer; Harman-Ising Productions
- Distributed by: Loew's, Inc.
- Release date: February 8, 1936
- Running time: 9 min
- Country: United States
- Language: English

The Early Bird and the Worm is a 1936 American animated short film directed by Rudolf Ising. It is the nineteenth film in the Happy Harmonies series. The name is a play on the adage "The early bird gets the worm."

The two lazy crows are voiced by (as well as caricatures of) then-famous blackface team Moran and Mack. Their dialogue is directly lifted from their hit 1927 comedy recording Two Black Crows.

== Plot ==
The early bird wakes up early to get the worm. The early bird sneaks behind the worm's house, fashioned from an apple, where the worm's mother warns him not to be caught by the early bird. The early bird wastes no time to give chase, with the worm skillfully evading capture. A rattlesnake follows them and fails to eat the bird. The worm finds two lazy crows debating if the early bird's efforts to get the worm are worth it. They chase the early bird and the worm until the rattlesnake fails to catch the early bird again. The worm hides in a bottle, with the early bird fighting with him over the cork, until the snake lunges and traps its head in the jar. The snake lunges again to break the jar and attempts to hypnotize the early bird, only to be hypnotized by the worm playing a snake charmer tune on his fife, saving the early bird. The snake also attempts to hypnotize the worm, but the worm is saved by the early bird tricking the snake into tying himself into a knot. Having gained mutual respect over rescuing each other, the early bird and the worm put aside their differences, only to find the two crows still chasing around a tree.
