= The Wayward Pups =

1937 film by Rudolf Ising

- Directed by: Rudolf Ising (uncredited)
- Produced by: Hugh Harman; Rudolf Ising
- Music by: Scott Bradley
- Color process: Technicolor
- Production companies: Metro-Goldwyn-Mayer; Harman-Ising Productions
- Distributed by: Loew's, Inc.
- Release date: July 10, 1937
- Running time: 8 min
- Country: United States
- Language: English

The Wayward Pups is a 1937 American animated short film directed by Rudolf Ising. It is the final appearance of the Two Little Pups and their only appearance directed by Ising for MGM to not be named as part of the Happy Harmonies series (though retroactively considered to be so). The cat that appears resembles Butch from the Tom and Jerry series; his appearance and Donald Duck-like voice would be solidified in Hugh Harman's 1941 short The Alley Cat.

== Plot ==
The two puppies play with a balloon, disturbing a cat's nap. The nearby fireplace ignites the balloon's rope on fire, popping the balloon and sending the cat flying. However, the cat leaves on time for the puppies to be blamed for the destruction. They are thrown into the yard by their furious owner and leave the house out of curiosity. As the door is locked, a dog catcher pursues the puppies.

The puppies escape to a backyard and find conveniently placed objects including a plate of water and bones. They earn the ire of the bulldog who lives in the backyard and has his doghouse chained to him, but the black puppy cunningly leads him to tie his chains around a post to limit his movement. They steal a bone but is chased by the dog catcher again, who in turn is also chased by the bulldog. Two actual stray dogs join the chase after noticing the bone. The puppies navigate busy crossroads and causes a string of fatal car crashes. To the dog catcher's horror, the dogs run into a dog show and attract every dog involved into the chase, causing him to climb a pole to avoid the stampede.

At night, the puppies' owner regrets throwing them out and theorizes their fate. The cat feels guilty for instigating the conflict and escapes to search for the puppies. By investigating tracks and a phone call from the police involving the commotion, the cat finds the dogs threatening the puppies for their bone. The cat beats up the dogs and allows the two puppies to escape. They return home with the cat cradling the puppies, having found a newfound appreciation for the puppies.
