= Mel Shaw =

American animator, design artist, writer, and artist

- Born: Melvin Schwartzman; December 19, 1914; Brooklyn, New York, U.S.
- Died: November 22, 2012 (aged 97); Reseda, California, U.S.
- Occupations: Animator; design artist; writer; artist

Mel Shaw (born Melvin Schwartzman; December 19, 1914 – November 22, 2012) was an American animator, design artist, writer, and artist. Shaw was involved in the animation, story design, and visual development of numerous Disney animated films, beginning with Bambi, which was released in 1942. His other animated film credits, usually involving animation design or the story, included The Rescuers in 1977, The Fox and the Hound in 1981, The Black Cauldron in 1985, The Great Mouse Detective in 1986, Beauty and the Beast in 1991, and The Lion King in 1994. He was named a Disney Legend in 2004 for his contributions to The Walt Disney Company.

== Early life ==
Shaw was born on December 19, 1914, in Brooklyn, New York. His mother was an opera singer and his father was a lawyer. He was the second oldest of four brothers born to his parents.

== Career ==
Shaw began his career in entertainment industry as a silent film title card creator at Pacific Title and Art, a company owned by film producer, Leon Schlesinger. He next worked for Orson Welles in the early 1930s, where Shaw helped to create a storyboard The Little Prince, though the proposed Welles film was never created. Shaw would later join Harman-Ising Productions, working on the early Looney Tunes and Merrie Melodies, as well as MGM's Happy Harmonies series.

Shaw was personally recruited by Walt Disney to work on the 1942 animated classic, Bambi. He left Disney Studios to enlist in the Army Signal Corps, where he served as a combat photographer during World War II.

Shaw returned to Disney's animation department in 1974 at the invitation of Walt Disney Studios. He returned to work on Disney animated films and mentored a new generation of animators. His last film at Disney was Brother Bear, released in 2003.

Shaw partnered with former MGM Studios animator Bob Allen to establish a design firm. Under Shaw and Allen, their company designed Howdy Doody for NBC during the late 1940s.

He was among a couple of artists who worked at Disney both during its Golden Age within the late-1930s as well as during the studio's resurgence within the 1990s.

== Death ==
Shaw died from congestive heart failure on November 22, 2012, at the Woodland Care Center in Reseda, California, at the age of 97. His first wife, Louise, died in 1984. Shaw's second wife, Florence Lounsbery, who died in 2004, was the widow of Disney animator, John Lounsbery. They had resided in Acampo, California, for more than twenty years.

== Filmography ==
- We're in the Money (short) (animator - uncredited) - 1933
- Tale of the Vienna Woods (short) (story, animator and character layouts - uncredited) - 1934
- Toyland Broadcast (short) (animator - uncredited) - 1934
- Good Little Monkeys (short) (animator - uncredited) - 1935
- Alias St. Nick (short) (animator - uncredited) - 1935
- Bottles (short) (animator - uncredited) - 1936
- To Spring (short) (animator - uncredited) - 1936
- Merbabies (short) (animator - uncredited) - 1938
- Fantasia (visual development artwork) - 1940
- Dumbo - 1941
- Bambi (writer, visual development artwork) - 1942
- The Adventures of Ichabod and Mr. Toad (visual development artwork for the Mr. Toad segment) - 1949
- Disneyland - (story for the Tricks of Our Trade episode) - 1957
- The Rescuers - 1977
- Deadman's Curve (TV Movie) (writer: "Baby Talk" song) - 1978
- The Fox and the Hound (creative assistant to the producers) - 1981
- The Black Cauldron (writer) - 1985
- The Great Mouse Detective (writer) - 1986
- It's Howdy Doody Time (TV special) (thanks - as Melvin Shaw) - 1987
- Beauty and the Beast (production consultant: visual development) - 1991
- The Lion King (visual development artist) - 1994
- Tarzan (assistant animator) - 1999
- Treasure Planet (key animator) - 2002
- Brother Bear (character designer) - 2003
- Finding Grandma (short) (editor) - 2010
