= Little Buck Cheeser =

1937 film by Rudolf Ising

- Directed by: Rudolf Ising (uncredited)
- Produced by: Hugh Harman; Rudolf Ising
- Music by: Scott Bradley
- Color process: Technicolor
- Production companies: Metro-Goldwyn-Mayer; Harman-Ising Productions
- Distributed by: Loew's, Inc.
- Release date: July 10, 1937
- Running time: 7 min
- Country: United States
- Language: English

Little Buck Cheeser is a 1937 American animated short film directed by Rudolf Ising. It is the final appearance of Little Cheeser and their only appearance directed by Ising for MGM to not be named as part of the Happy Harmonies series (though retroactively considered to be so). One of the first science fiction cartoons, it is best known for being featured in the opening credits of Futurama pilot episode "Space Pilot 3000".

== Plot ==
Little Cheeser reluctantly goes to sleep and refuses to pray before sleep. One of his friends lead him to a telescope where he and other young mice discover the Moon. They believe the Moon is made of green cheese, except for a tough mouse who eats nails and spits them out to light a match. Little Cheeser resolves to outsmart the tough mouse by going to the Moon.

Little Cheeser discovers a Buck Rogers comic strip and decides to build a rocket ship. The mice improvise with household items and explosives, while the tough mouse also helps by spitting nails. They accidentally fly into the fireplace, who propels them out of the chimney into space. The tough mouse suffers from severe motion sickness, especially after seeing a mouse eat a sandwich. They nonsensically find the Milky Way halfway during the trip to the Moon. They arrive to find that the Moon is indeed made of green cheese. They fail to remove a chunk of the landmass, then sink into a pool of Limburger cheese. The rocket ship takes off again but crash lands. Little Cheeser wakes up from his nightmare and prays before he sleeps again.
