= The Lost Chick =

1935 film by Hugh Harman

- Title card
- Directed by: Hugh Harman (uncredited)
- Produced by: Hugh Harman; Rudolf Ising
- Music by: Scott Bradley
- Color process: Technicolor
- Production companies: Metro-Goldwyn-Mayer; Harman-Ising Productions
- Distributed by: Loew's, Inc.
- Release date: March 9, 1935
- Running time: 10 minutes
- Country: United States
- Language: English

The Lost Chick is a 1935 American animated comedy short film directed by Hugh Harman. It is the eighth film in the Happy Harmonies series.

== Plot ==
A hen joyfully awaits the birth of her seven children, each named with the first letter to collectively form "WELCOME". One of the eggs named Eggbert accidentally rolls off the nest and out of the farm.

Two squirrels searching for nuts find the egg, not knowing what an egg is, rolls it home as if it is a larger nut after abandoning their own collection of nuts. They are berated by their grandfather and peers for abandoning their nuts. To their peers' amusement and ridicule, the egg does hatch into Eggbert the chick. Regardless, they feed the chick popcorn and reject the squirrels' suggestion to throw him out. The chick spits out the popcorn which pop in his stomach.

The hen knits pajamas for Eggbert, only noticing his disappearance after the six other chicks go to bed with their pajamas. She rushes out of her house in search of Eggbert, noticing him in the squirrels' house while they try to stop Eggbert from spitting popcorn. She berates the squirrels, not realizing they had helped her care for the eggs, until Eggbert expresses his concern during a violent snowstorm. The squirrels find a nut while trying to survive the winter, but almost freeze to death when the hen finds them. The hen nurses them to health and allow them to stay much to their joy.
