= Honeyland (1935 film) =

1935 film by Rudolf Ising

- Title card
- Directed by: Rudolf Ising
- Produced by: Hugh Harman; Rudolf Ising
- Music by: Scott Bradley
- Color process: Technicolor
- Production companies: Metro-Goldwyn-Mayer; Harman-Ising Productions
- Distributed by: Loew's, Inc.
- Release date: October 19, 1935
- Running time: 10 min
- Country: United States
- Language: English

Honeyland is a 1935 American animated short film directed by Rudolf Ising. It is the fifteenth film in the Happy Harmonies series.

== Plot ==
Bees are harvesting nectar from flowers to make honey, as the camera turns to a trio of singing female bees. They perform the song as bees are shown making honey, using ways like human techniques of farming, a stereotypical "French chef" tasting it, and melting candle wax to preserve, a reference to beeswax.

Two bees, one male and one female, are shown chasing each other, outside the safety of the hive. Then, the antagonist (a spider) comes in and chases and captures the female bee. The male bee tries to fight the spider, and the female escapes. Using a flower as a rotary telephone, she contacts the operator, telling him to call for all bees. They come into formation, as the spider tries to escape. To a part of Rimsky-Korsakov's "Flight of the Bumblebee", all of the bees continually sting the spider's abdomen, and the spider runs off. The female bee goes to aid the male bee, and with a kiss, he is happy, and all the bees cheer.
