= Alias St. Nick =

1935 film by Rudolf Ising

- Directed by: Rudolf Ising
- Produced by: Hugh Harman; Rudolf Ising
- Music by: Scott Bradley
- Color process: Technicolor
- Production companies: Metro-Goldwyn-Mayer; Harman-Ising Productions
- Distributed by: Loew's, Inc.
- Release date: November 16, 1935
- Running time: 10 min
- Country: United States
- Language: English

Alias St. Nick is a 1935 American animated short film directed by Rudolf Ising. It is the sixteenth film in the Happy Harmonies series and the second cartoon to feature a character later to be named Little Cheeser.

== Plot ==
On Christmas Eve, mice listen to their mother reading The Night Before Christmas. One mouse refuses to believe in Santa Claus, much to the chagrin of his siblings. A cat attempts to sneak into their house to eat the mice, but trips and notifies them. The mice think he is Santa Claus until they realize the truth and attack him with a prepared booby trap.

The cat has the idea to disguise himself as Santa Claus after hearing the mice quarrel. He finds a toyshop, improvises a disguise with random objects and rigs a toy with a mousetrap. He arrives to the skeptical mouse's shock. All of the mice, except for the unbelieving mouse, take toys that are not rigged with the trap; the skeptical mouse refuses the toy rigged with the mousetrap out of spite. The skeptical mouse realizes Santa Claus is indeed the cat after his disguise is briefly uncovered by a toy train ridden by mice. The disguise is finally undone after mice swordfighting accidentally pop the balloon. As the mice drive the cat away with the toys and firecrackers, the skeptical mouse is happy that his point has been proven.
