= The Pups' Picnic =

1936 film by Rudolf Ising

- Directed by: Rudolf Ising (uncredited)
- Produced by: Hugh Harman; Rudolf Ising
- Music by: Scott Bradley
- Color process: Technicolor
- Production companies: Metro-Goldwyn-Mayer; Harman-Ising Productions
- Distributed by: Loew's, Inc.
- Release date: May 30, 1936
- Running time: 8 min
- Country: United States
- Language: English

The Pups' Picnic is a 1936 American animated short film directed by Rudolf Ising. It is the 23rd film in the Happy Harmonies series and the second appearance of the Two Little Pups.

== Plot ==
The two puppies go on a picnic with their owners. They are scolded for wanting food, while the white puppy manages to eat a sandwich before leaving to play. They are distracted by a bee before they find a fox being hunted by bloodhounds. They wound up being chased by the fox while the bloodhounds and their owners follow. A yellow bloodhound consistently outperforms the other bloodhounds despite being older. The two puppies work with the bloodhound to trap the fox. However, the two puppies return to their owners' car, while the fox sits on the spare tire, causing the hunting party to chase them on the road instead.
