= Swing Wedding =

1937 film by Hugh Harman

- Directed by: Hugh Harman
- Produced by: Hugh Harman; Rudolf Ising
- Music by: Scott Bradley
- Color process: Technicolor
- Production companies: Metro-Goldwyn-Mayer; Harman-Ising Productions
- Distributed by: Loew's, Inc.
- Release date: February 13, 1937
- Running time: 8 min
- Country: United States
- Language: English

Swing Wedding is a 1937 American animated comedy short film directed by Hugh Harman. It is the first Harman-Ising cartoon at MGM to not named as part of the Happy Harmonies series (though retroactively considered to be so) and a sequel to The Old Mill Pond. The film is infamous for a scene in which a frog destroys a trumpet to find a vial of heroin, which he injects into his arm; it somehow made it past the Hays Code despite a strict ban on the depiction of drug use.

== Plot ==
The Jazz Frogs sing at a wedding in a swamp. The frogs are designed as caricatures of various African American celebrities of the 1930s, such as Ethel Waters, Stepin Fetchit, Louis Armstrong, Cab Calloway, Fats Waller and the Mills Brothers.

== Reception ==
National Exhibitor (March 20, 1937): "The frogs put on a wedding to hot music. Caricatures are made of Negro mannerisms. There appear characters very much like Stepin Fetchit, Bill Robinson, Cab Calloway, Fats Waller. This isn't up to the previous efforts from the Harman-Ising bunch".

Boxoffice (Apr 10, 1937): "Against a background of riotous color, Harman-Ising studios have executed a clever satire on the current craze for swing music which is certain to add a bright note to any program. Such famous sepia stars as Cab Calloway a famous American jazz singer, dancer, bandleader and actor, "Fats" Waller a Pianist and Bill Robinson who was a famous tap dancer during the first half of the 20th century these African American musicians and dancers are caricatured as frogs and the resemblance to the millpond denizens is astounding. The musical accompaniment to the gay frog-pond wedding ceremony is delightfully swinging, although the basic tunes are easily recognizable. A distinctly novel color cartoon".

Selected Motion Pictures (May 1, 1937): "A colorful fantasy of the wedding of two frogs. Fine musical syncopation. Amusing though noisy entertainment".
