= Little Cheeser =

1936 film by Rudolf Ising

- Directed by: Rudolf Ising (uncredited)
- Produced by: Hugh Harman; Rudolf Ising
- Music by: Scott Bradley
- Color process: Technicolor
- Production companies: Metro-Goldwyn-Mayer; Harman-Ising Productions
- Distributed by: Loew's, Inc.
- Release date: July 11, 1936
- Running time: 9 min
- Country: United States
- Language: English

Little Cheeser is a 1936 American animated short film directed by Rudolf Ising. It is the 25th film in the Happy Harmonies series and the third appearance of the titular character.

== Plot ==
Little Cheeser does not want to sleep. His shoulder devil motivates him to leave home and steal cheese, only to be stopped by his shoulder angel. The shoulder devil then makes him smoke a pipe, which is extinguished by the shoulder angel. The shoulder devil shows Little Cheeser lewd images of women and pours alcohol into his mouth. As Little Cheeser drunkenly tries to taunt a nearby cat, the shoulder angel and shoulder devil fight before the shoulder devil is locked into a copy of Dante's Inferno. The cat finally appears and chases Little Cheeser home. Little Cheeser regrets his actions and prays before bed.
