= Tale of the Vienna Woods =

1934 film by Hugh Harman

- Title card
- Directed by: Hugh Harman (uncredited)
- Produced by: Hugh Harman; Rudolf Ising
- Music by: Scott Bradley
- Color process: Technicolor
- Production companies: Metro-Goldwyn-Mayer; Harman-Ising Productions
- Distributed by: Loew's, Inc.
- Release date: October 27, 1934
- Running time: 8 min
- Country: United States
- Language: English

Tale of the Vienna Woods is a 1934 American animated short film directed by Hugh Harman. It is the third film in the Happy Harmonies series. It features "Tales from the Vienna Woods" by Johann Strauss II.

== Plot ==
In the woods of Vienna, a fawn drinks water and prances its way to a fountain with a satyr statue. The sunlight causes the satyr to come to life and dance with the fawn. The fawn gains a flower wreath after falling into flowers.

The satyr grabs grapes and squeezes them into wine, which they both drink and become drunk. The satyr blows a dandelion and sprays flowers on the fawn to its amusement. After the satyr climbs up a tree, the fawn pulls a vine which tangles around the satyr. The satyr then tricks the fawn into falling into water while he walks across land. The satyr dances on a log to mock the fawn, which the fawn uses to its advantage by tripping the satyr.

The fawn and satyr finds a group of hunting dogs, which they evade by hiding in a bush and tree, as the dogs are too stupid to identify the scent. The satyr returns to his fountain and bids the fawn goodbye, only to find the fawn being chased by the dogs. As night falls, he quickly saves the fawn before arriving at his fountain and turning back into a statue at the nick of time.
