= Run Sheep, Run! =

1935 film by Hugh Harman

Hey-Hey Fever
- Directed by: Hugh Harman (uncredited)
- Produced by: Hugh Harman; Rudolf Ising
- Music by: Scott Bradley
- Color process: Technicolor
- Production companies: Metro-Goldwyn-Mayer; Harman-Ising Productions
- Distributed by: Loew's, Inc.
- Release date: December 14, 1935
- Running time: 10 minutes
- Country: United States
- Language: English

Run Sheep, Run is a 1935 American animated comedy short film directed by Hugh Harman. The seventeenth film in the Happy Harmonies series, it is the 41st cartoon to star Bosko and is notorious for being the first cartoon to feature his redesign as a realistic African-American boy. Due to its stereotypical depiction of African-American people, it has remained out of circulation since its initial release.

== Plot ==
Bosko sleeps under a tree and dreams himself dancing with four white lambs, who sing while he plays the fife. He warns the lambs not to go into the dark woods. As he wakes Bruno up to guard the lambs, a black lamb shows up and decides to go into the dark woods. He pretends to have been captured by choking himself with a glove to attract Bosko's attention, much to his chagrin.

As the black lamb runs off again, Bruno plans to stop him by dressing up in Bosko's bearskin carpet. He succeeds in scaring off the black lamb, but accidentally attracts Bosko's attention. Oblivious of the situation, Bosko shoots Bruno with his shotgun, destroying numerous trees in the process. He finds Bruno knocked out, but laugh together when he wakes up. A bear then chases them back into Bosko's house, collapsing it except for the door. The bear chases them as they hide in the appliance, until the black lamb appears to reveal that the bear is actually the four lambs in disguise. They continue to sing and dance. Bosko wakes up from his dream and is amused.
