= Barnyard Babies =

1935 film by Rudolf Ising

- Title card
- Directed by: Rudolf Ising (uncredited)
- Produced by: Hugh Harman; Rudolf Ising
- Music by: Scott Bradley
- Color process: Technicolor
- Production companies: Metro-Goldwyn-Mayer; Harman-Ising Productions
- Distributed by: Loew's, Inc.
- Release date: May 25, 1935
- Running time: 9 minutes
- Country: United States
- Language: English

Barnyard Babies is a 1935 American animated comedy short film directed by Rudolf Ising. It is the thirteenth film in the Happy Harmonies series and the last film in the series to use two-strip Technicolor, as Walt Disney Productions lost exclusivity to three-strip Technicolor after its release.

== Plot ==
At a farm, the animals start a talent show to compare their babies on the next day. A rooster is horrified when he realizes that his wife's eggs hatch a day after the show. He attempts to speed up the process by laying a towel soaked in scalding hot water on the eggs while his wife hatches. This seems futile while the contest begins.

During the show, a duckling accidentally falls into apple cider while causing a hen to fall into a tube and have her feathers removed temporarily. The drunk duckling eats a spring it believes to be a worm. He makes his way to a performer horse's hat and destroys it while bouncing. The rooster heats his wife and eggs in the oven for hours until they prematurely hatch. The duckling wins the show for his humorous interruption, but he launches the trophy into a see saw. It lands between the rooster and hen with their children in the trophy, apparently allowing them to usurp the reward.
