= When the Cat's Away (1935 film) =

1935 film by Rudolf Ising

- Title card
- Directed by: Rudolf Ising (uncredited)
- Produced by: Hugh Harman; Rudolf Ising
- Music by: Scott Bradley
- Color process: Technicolor
- Production companies: Metro-Goldwyn-Mayer; Harman-Ising Productions
- Distributed by: Loew's, Inc.
- Release date: February 16, 1935
- Running time: 8 minutes
- Country: United States
- Language: English

When the Cat's Away is a 1935 American animated comedy short film directed by Rudolf Ising. It is the seventh film in the Happy Harmonies series and the first cartoon to feature a character later to be named Little Cheeser.

== Plot ==
A female cat is seduced by a stray cat who sing with her on the rooftops. A small mouse hiding in a sugar jar catches wind of the occasion and closes the windows, signaling to the other mice and rats of their freedom. Much to his chagrin, the mice and rats quickly devour all the food, but one rat accidentally launches a banana into the mouse's mouth. The mice and rats perform a musical number and drink alcoholic beverages. A mouse falls into a mousetrap, which causes another mouse to be thrown into multiple objects and wake the cockroaches. As the small mouse dances with his sweetheart, she is abducted by a giant rat. The small mouse tries to terrify the rat with a magnifying glass to no avail, only for the cat to return and pursue it. The small mouse gives the cat a bowl of milk, which she graciously accepts, before he returns to the mousehole.
