= The Chinese Nightingale =

1935 film by Rudolf Ising

- Title card
- Directed by: Rudolf Ising (uncredited)
- Produced by: Hugh Harman; Rudolf Ising
- Music by: Scott Bradley
- Color process: Technicolor
- Production companies: Metro-Goldwyn-Mayer; Harman-Ising Productions
- Distributed by: Loew's, Inc.
- Release date: April 27, 1935
- Running time: 9 minutes
- Country: United States
- Language: English

The Chinese Nightingale is a 1935 American animated comedy short film directed by Rudolf Ising. It is the eleventh film in the Happy Harmonies series. It is an abridged adaptation of Hans Christian Andersen's fairy tale The Nightingale.

== Plot ==
Three women sing the story of a nightingale who was beloved by a Qing dynasty Chinese emperor. He plays a musical instrument while the nightingale sings. The nightingale's friend, a crow, notifies it that the emperor is brought a mechanical nightingale by the Japanese as a birthday gift. The nightingale realizes that the mechanical nightingale has replaced her as the emperor's plaything. The nightingale leaves for a better life. Angered, the crow fights the mechanical nightingale and annihilates it. The Chinese emperor realizes his mistake and misses the nightingale as the days pass. The crow continuously tries to search for the nightingale and finds her to have started a family. The crow brings the nightingale and its three offspring to the emperor, who celebrate in song. It is revealed that the story is spread through song and a portrait depicted in the palace.
