= Toyland Broadcast =

1934 film by Rudolf Ising

- Title card
- Directed by: Rudolf Ising (uncredited)
- Produced by: Hugh Harman; Rudolf Ising
- Music by: Scott Bradley
- Color process: Technicolor
- Production companies: Metro-Goldwyn-Mayer; Harman-Ising Productions
- Distributed by: Loew's, Inc.
- Release date: December 22, 1934
- Running time: 8 min
- Country: United States
- Language: English

Toyland Broadcast is a 1934 American animated short film directed by Rudolf Ising. It is the fifth film in the Happy Harmonies series.

== Plot ==
A party of 1940s celebrity caricatures, including Bing Crosby, The Mills Brothers, Kate Smith, The Boswell Sisters, Paul Whiteman, Rudy Vallée, Ethel Waters, David Rubinoff, amongst other radio stars, perform for other toys.
