= Bosko's Easter Eggs =

1937 film by Hugh Harman

- Directed by: Hugh Harman (uncredited)
- Produced by: Hugh Harman; Rudolf Ising
- Music by: Scott Bradley
- Color process: Technicolor
- Production companies: Metro-Goldwyn-Mayer; Harman-Ising Productions
- Distributed by: Loew's, Inc.
- Release date: March 20, 1937
- Running time: 7 min
- Country: United States
- Language: English

Bosko's Easter Eggs is a 1937 American animated short film directed by Hugh Harman. It is the first Bosko cartoon at MGM to not named as part of the Happy Harmonies series (though retroactively considered to be so), the 44th cartoon to star Bosko and the last cartoon to feature Honey.

== Plot ==
Bosko delivers Easter eggs while Honey looks after her hen. After he breaks all of his Easter eggs while foolishly walking on a fence, He finds Honey's hen and attempts to steal her eggs. He succeeds and paints them like Easter eggs, which does not fool Honey. The eggs are about to hatch but the hen is missing in action, so Bosko and Honey find her while Bruno guards the eggs. The hen vengefully chases Bosko and Bruno until she finds the eggs to have hatched into rainbow-colored chicks.
