= The Old Mill Pond =

1936 film by Hugh Harman

- Directed by: Hugh Harman (uncredited)
- Produced by: Hugh Harman; Rudolf Ising
- Music by: Scott Bradley
- Color process: Technicolor
- Production companies: Metro-Goldwyn-Mayer; Harman-Ising Productions
- Distributed by: Loew's, Inc.
- Release date: March 7, 1936
- Running time: 8 min
- Country: United States
- Language: English

The Old Mill Pond is a 1936 American animated short film directed by Hugh Harman. It is the 20th film in the Happy Harmonies series.

The short was nominated at the 1936 Academy Awards for Academy Award for Best Animated Short Film but lost to Walt Disney Productions' Silly Symphony short, The Country Cousin. Harman regarded the cartoon as one of his best and is one in three cartoons that he did not disown. The Old Mill Pond was followed by a sequel, Swing Wedding in 1937.

== Plot ==
Fish and frogs gather at a pond. The performers are caricatures of Cab Calloway, Fats Waller, Bill "Bojangles" Robinson, Louis Armstrong, Stepin Fetchit, Ethel Waters and The Mills Brothers.

== Reception ==
The Film Daily (May 13, 1936): "This musical comedy cartoon is a knockout. Following the opening, which is the song "Down by the Old Mill Stream", the impersonations are Cab Calloway and his band doing "Minnie the Moocher" routine, "Fats" Waller doing his piano number, Bill Robinson his taps, the Mills Bros. their "Hold That Tiger", Stepin Fechit is presented, and a dancing chorus does "Jungle Rhythm". The Technicolor is beautiful, especially in the water numbers. This short is just one load of entertainment all the way through".

The Film Daily (June 1, 1936): "In Technicolor, a swell interpretation by the frogs in the millpond of the famous colored artists of tap dance and orchestra. The leading lights among the colored entertainers are presented in fine imitations, the technique is very clever, and the entire production a real novelty in cartoon with beautiful color and catchy music".
