= Good Little Monkeys =

1935 film by Hugh Harman

- Title card
- Directed by: Hugh Harman
- Produced by: Hugh Harman; Rudolf Ising
- Music by: Scott Bradley
- Color process: Technicolor
- Production companies: Metro-Goldwyn-Mayer; Harman-Ising Productions
- Distributed by: Loew's, Inc.
- Release date: March 9, 1935
- Running time: 8 minutes
- Country: United States
- Language: English

Good Little Monkeys is a 1935 American animated comedy short film directed by Hugh Harman. It is the tenth film in the Happy Harmonies series and the first cartoon to feature the titular characters, a parody of the three wise monkeys.

The film was given a substantially higher marketing budget than other cartoons in the series; it was marketed by Metro-Goldwyn-Mayer (MGM) as a successor to Walt Disney Productions' Three Little Pigs (1933) and given stylized avant-garde posters drawn by famed caricaturist Al Hirschfeld. It was successful enough to be followed by the sequels Pipe Dreams (1939) and Art Gallery (1939), being the only characters from Harman-Ising Productions to be carried over to MGM's in-house studio.

== Plot ==
At night, the Devil emerges from a copy of Dante Alighieri's Inferno. He explores his surroundings and hides in a skull for his amusement. He spots the Good Little Monkeys reciting their maxim to his amusement, sparking an idea to lead them into Hell. He rings a gong to wake up all other book characters, who party to tempt the monkeys to no avail. He shakes two peanuts like maracas while book characters, such as Rip Van Winkle and a literal interpretation of Black Beauty, interact with the music. The monkeys become tempted once they hear the Devil singing like a crooner and guiding them with peanuts. The monkeys come back to their senses after the Devil tempts them with an exotic dancer. The Devil decides to physically assault them, but they attack him instead. Boy Scouts, police officers and Napoleon's troops retaliate and shoot him with pencil tips. Rip Van Winkle, Tarzan and more book characters pursue him as he returns to the copy of Inferno; Tarzan and his elephant stand on the book to seal him. The Good Little Monkeys return to their stand and recite the maxim again, though the middle monkey is amused by the events.

== Reception ==
Motion Picture Herald noted that the film "bids fair to be considered one of the season's outstanding cartoon subjects".
