= Poor Little Me =

1935 film by Hugh Harman

- Title card
- Directed by: Hugh Harman (uncredited)
- Produced by: Hugh Harman; Rudolf Ising
- Music by: Scott Bradley
- Color process: Technicolor
- Production companies: Metro-Goldwyn-Mayer; Harman-Ising Productions
- Distributed by: Loew's, Inc.
- Release date: May 11, 1935
- Running time: 10 minutes
- Country: United States
- Language: English

Poor Little Me is a 1935 American animated comedy short film directed by Hugh Harman. It is the twelfth film in the Happy Harmonies series.

== Plot ==
Animal children dance and have fun in nature, except for a skunk who cries in the sidelines as he is rejected for his scent, yet is unwilling to seek company from his family. He tries to gain the children's favor again but they run for their lives.

The skunk finds a little rabbit girl who has a cold and is unable to smell him. They become fast friends and play on a swing. They encounter a large bobcat who wants to abduct the rabbit girl. The skunk manages to stop the bobcat during the commotion as he brings the rabbit home, only to be thrown out by the rabbit's mother. The skunk's family knock out the bobcat with their combined scents. The skunk gains a newfound appreciation.

== See also ==
- Elmer Elephant
