= The Old Pioneer =

1934 film by Rudolf Ising

- Title card
- Directed by: Rudolf Ising
- Produced by: Hugh Harman; Rudolf Ising
- Music by: Scott Bradley
- Color process: Technicolor
- Production companies: Metro-Goldwyn-Mayer; Harman-Ising Productions
- Distributed by: Loew's, Inc.
- Release date: September 29, 1934
- Running time: 8 min
- Country: United States
- Language: English

The Old Pioneer is a 1934 American animated short film directed by Rudolf Ising. It is the second film in the Happy Harmonies series to be produced by Harman-Ising Productions for Metro-Goldwyn-Mayer.

== Plot ==
An old man walks past a paperboy and tells him of his old adventures after seeing the statue of a Native American. He travels across California with animals and other people, ignoring a hitchhiker. He parties with other pioneers when a Native American spots them and notifies other Native Americans in his village, including a boy, who is interested and sneaks out. He drops his bow and arrow and is trapped on a branch, causing a boulder to roll down as he falls. The man saves the boy but finds the Native Americans rushing the wagon circle. A shootout occurs with both Native Americans and pioneers on equal footing, with the boy's father, the village chief, attempting to assassinate the man until the boy stops him for the man saving his life. The man is gifted a flute as a sign of gratitude while he gives the chief three cigars, who is revealed to be the man depicted in the statue.
