= The Pups' Christmas =

1936 film by Rudolf Ising

- Directed by: Rudolf Ising (uncredited)
- Produced by: Hugh Harman; Rudolf Ising
- Music by: Scott Bradley
- Color process: Technicolor
- Production companies: Metro-Goldwyn-Mayer; Harman-Ising Productions
- Distributed by: Loew's, Inc.
- Release date: December 12, 1936
- Running time: 8 min
- Country: United States
- Language: English

The Pups' Christmas is a 1936 American animated short film directed by Rudolf Ising. It is the 26th film in the Happy Harmonies series and the third appearance of the Two Little Pups.

== Plot ==
The two puppies and their owners' children wake up early on Christmas to open their gifts. They interact with some toys and finds a dog stuffed toy, which they are aggressive towards despite it being no threat. The brown puppy is stuck in a stroller with a talking doll and somehow detaches the sound box. The black puppy is hit by a toy tank's ammunition. He chases the tank and is startled by its aggressive behavior. The tank fights a toy airplane which crashes on it, but is apparently still operational.
