= Two Little Pups =

1936 film by Rudolf Ising

- Directed by: Rudolf Ising (uncredited)
- Produced by: Hugh Harman; Rudolf Ising
- Music by: Scott Bradley
- Color process: Technicolor
- Production companies: Metro-Goldwyn-Mayer; Harman-Ising Productions
- Distributed by: Loew's, Inc.
- Release date: April 4, 1936
- Running time: 8 min
- Country: United States
- Language: English

Two Little Pups is a 1936 American animated short film directed by Rudolf Ising. It is the 21st film in the Happy Harmonies series and the first appearance of the titular characters.

== Plot ==
Two little puppies fight over a piece of cloth when they spot a hen entering their owner's farm to steal food. They chase the hen and cause destruction to the nearby crops. The hen lands on a land mower which flings tomatoes into her face, peel potatoes and places flowers into pots. The hen lands in a scarecrow's outfit, scaring the puppies. They chase the hen into their doghouse and eventually on a fountain. They chase through mud where one of the puppies fling mud on the hen. They fail to trap the hen in clothes and choke it to death after stepping on more clothes. They eventually chase the hen outside, much to her chagrin.
