= The Calico Dragon =

1935 film by Rudolf Ising

- Title card
- Directed by: Rudolf Ising
- Produced by: Hugh Harman; Rudolf Ising
- Music by: Scott Bradley
- Color process: Technicolor
- Production companies: Metro-Goldwyn-Mayer; Harman-Ising Productions
- Distributed by: Loew's, Inc.
- Release date: March 30, 1935
- Running time: 7 min
- Country: United States
- Language: English

The Calico Dragon is a 1935 American animated comedy short film directed by Rudolf Ising. It is the ninth film in the Happy Harmonies series. The cartoon was nominated for the Academy Award for Best Short Subject: Cartoons in 1935, Harman-Ising Productions' second nomination after the Merrie Melodies cartoon It's Got Me Again! in 1931, but lost against Walt Disney Productions' Silly Symphony cartoon Three Orphan Kittens.

== Plot ==
When a little girl falls asleep after reading a fairy tale to her doll, her toys come to life. The toys act out a fairy tale in which a prince has to fight a three-headed dragon.
