= Little Ol' Bosko and the Pirates =

1937 film by Hugh Harman

- Directed by: Hugh Harman (uncredited)
- Produced by: Hugh Harman; Rudolf Ising
- Music by: Scott Bradley
- Color process: Technicolor
- Production companies: Metro-Goldwyn-Mayer; Harman-Ising Productions
- Distributed by: Loew's, Inc.
- Release date: May 1, 1937
- Running time: 8 min
- Country: United States
- Language: English

Little Ol' Bosko and the Pirates is a 1937 American animated short film directed by Hugh Harman. It is not named as part of the Happy Harmonies series (though retroactively considered to be so), the 45th cartoon to star Bosko and the first to pair him with the Jazz Frogs, a combination that lasted until Bosko was retired.

== Plot ==
Bosko is instructed by his mother to deliver cookies to his grandmother. He falls into a wooden bucket floating on a lake and somehow reaches the high seas. He is abducted by the Jazz Frogs, who are pirates and threaten him through song for his cookies. They fail to make him walk the plank. The frogs party until Bosko falls into a powder keg and blows up the ship. It is revealed that the ordeal is imagined by Bosko, who finds a destroyed boat during the monotonous journey of rowing across the lake, as he reaches his grandmother's house by foot.
