= The Old Plantation (film) =

1935 film by Rudolf Ising

- Title card
- Directed by: Rudolf Ising (uncredited)
- Produced by: Hugh Harman; Rudolf Ising
- Music by: Scott Bradley
- Color process: Technicolor
- Production companies: Metro-Goldwyn-Mayer; Harman-Ising Productions
- Distributed by: Loew's, Inc.
- Release date: September 21, 1935
- Running time: 10 minutes
- Country: United States
- Language: English

The Old Plantation is a 1935 American animated comedy short film directed by Rudolf Ising. It is the fourteenth film in the Happy Harmonies series and the first non-Walt Disney Productions cartoon to use three-strip Technicolor, as Disney lost exclusivity to three-strip Technicolor before its release; the series took a four-month hiatus to adopt the process. It is a parody of the 1852 novel Uncle Tom's Cabin with mechanical toys. Because of the racial stereotypes of black people throughout the short, it is withheld from circulation.

== Plot ==
Slaves sing "My Old Kentucky Home". A mammy toy picks cotton and sings a lullaby to her master Eva. Simon Legree appears to warn the plantation's owner, Eva's father, of its upcoming foreclosure.

A horse race is being organized. Eva's father is hit on the head with a horseshoe accidentally thrown by a slave girl, becoming convinced to win the race for the money. Simon Legree overhears them and rigs their mechanical horse by removing its innards and dumping it into a nearby pond, intending for his horse to win. The slave girl realizes at the last minute and improvises by lighting fireworks. After it explodes and she fails to make progress, she uses one last firework to finish all the laps quickly. Simon is too obsessed with a photo finish and is accidentally left behind by the other racers. As the horse explodes again, the slave girl runs with the horse at the final stretch with Simon close behind, winning at the last second.
