= The Old House (film) =

1936 film by Hugh Harman

- Directed by: Hugh Harman (uncredited)
- Produced by: Hugh Harman; Rudolf Ising
- Music by: Scott Bradley
- Color process: Technicolor
- Production companies: Metro-Goldwyn-Mayer; Harman-Ising Productions
- Distributed by: Loew's, Inc.
- Release date: May 2, 1936
- Running time: 9 min
- Country: United States
- Language: English

The Old House is a 1936 American animated short film directed by Hugh Harman. It is the 22nd film in the Happy Harmonies series, the 42nd cartoon to star Bosko and the first cartoon to star a redesigned Honey.

== Plot ==
Bosko tells Bruno horror stories, only to be scared by Honey from behind. She dares them to enter an abandoned haunted house, which she enters frantically due to a thunderstorm. She is immediately spooked, spurring Bosko to rescue her.

Bosko falls into the basement and accidentally hooks his overalls into a broken record player, which scares him after he untangles it. Bosko races up stairs and falls through a floor onto a broken bed. He lands on a spring who brings him into the laundry. Honey, who hides behind clothes, is spooked upon seeing Bosko tangled in a white dress which resembles a ghost. A moose head lands on the dress Honey is hiding under, which also spooks Bosko.

Bruno, having spent most of the film chained and helpless, breaks the chain and runs to the mansion. Honey does not realize a skeleton is behind her. As the skeleton scares Bruno, Honey finally realizes the "ghost" is Bosko and is amused. They both laugh until Honey falls into a lift which brings the skeleton up. Bosko is so spooked his shoes stick to the floorboard which separates as he runs away. The trio are scared by the skeleton, which is shattered by Bruno; the skull lands on more objects Bruno runs into and is stuck to, which resembles the Grim Reaper. Bosko shoots it with a shotgun to find Bruno unscathed, alongside a record player which happens to finish broadcasting a horror story record.
