= Art Gallery (film) =

1939 film by Hugh Harman

- Title card
- Directed by: Hugh Harman (uncredited)
- Produced by: Hugh Harman; Fred Quimby (uncredited)
- Music by: Scott Bradley
- Color process: Technicolor
- Production company: Metro-Goldwyn-Mayer
- Distributed by: Loew's, Inc.
- Release date: May 13, 1939
- Running time: 8 min
- Country: United States
- Language: English

Art Gallery is a 1939 American animated short film directed by Hugh Harman. It was the first cartoon to be directed by Harman for Metro-Goldwyn-Mayer's cartoon department. It is the final appearance of the Good Little Monkeys, who appeared in the titular film and Pipe Dreams (1938).

== Plot ==
At an art gallery, a statue of Nero desires to burn the painting of Rome behind him, but realizes matches fashioned from limestone do not work. He finds the Good Little Monkeys in front of a painting of matches and fails to convince them to light one of those matches. As the paintings come to life singing the monkeys' mantra, Nero plays a sad violin song and cries crocodile tears to convince the monkeys, who become drunk on lighter fluid when playing with a lighter. Nero revels in the destruction as fire spreads to the other paintings. The monkeys escape into paintings with water and return to their stands.
