= Pipe Dreams (1938 film) =

1938 film by Hugh Harman

- Directed by: Hugh Harman
- Produced by: Hugh Harman; Rudolf Ising
- Music by: Scott Bradley
- Color process: Technicolor
- Production companies: Metro-Goldwyn-Mayer; Harman-Ising Productions
- Distributed by: Loew's, Inc.
- Release date: February 5, 1938
- Running time: 8 min
- Country: United States
- Language: English

Pipe Dreams is a 1938 American animated comedy short film directed by Hugh Harman. It is not named as part of the Happy Harmonies series (though retroactively considered to be so), the second appearance of the Good Little Monkeys and the final cartoon to be directed by Harman before he moved to Metro-Goldwyn-Mayer.

== Plot ==
The Good Little Monkeys sing their mantra. They neglect it once they find a pipe and tobacco, which they happen to light correctly through trial and error. They instinctively breathe in the fumes and are overwhelmed.

The monkeys find cigarette butts who sing like a barbershop quartet and influence them. A bull-shaped lighter rams them but fails, destroying it in the process. The cigarettes emerge from an ashtray in blackface and hitchhike on matchbox trains. The monkeys follow them in chewing tobacco on a cart. who leads them to hillbilly cigarettes who sing and influence them. Good Little Monkeys realize their mistakes and use the matchbox trains to escape, while Mexican cigarettes chase them and light the matches. As the matchboxes explode, the monkeys are thrown into the air and land next to their stand, where they return to sing their mantra.
