= One Step Ahead of My Shadow =

1933 film by Rudolf Ising

- Title card
- Directed by: Rudolf Ising
- Produced by: Hugh Harman; Rudolf Ising; Leon Schlesinger
- Music by: Frank Marsales
- Animation by: Isadore Freleng; Max Maxwell
- Color process: Black-and-white
- Production companies: Harman-Ising Productions; Leon Schlesinger Productions
- Distributed by: Warner Bros. Pictures; The Vitaphone Corporation
- Release date: February 4, 1933
- Running time: 7 min
- Country: United States
- Language: English

One Step Ahead of My Shadow is a 1933 American animated comedy short film directed by Rudolf Ising. It is the 20th film in the Merrie Melodies series and the earliest to have its copyright renewed by Warner Bros. Pictures. It features the titular song from the then-upcoming film Footlight Parade. It was released on February 4, 1933.

== Plot ==
In Qing dynasty Shanghai, a bustling city is observed. A traffic controller uses his queue as a stoplight, only to be shocked by two mice carrying an outhouse. A biker uses his queue to honk while a tram titled "Shanghai Express" is controlled by a man and his queue. Two men impersonate Amos 'n' Andy.

A boy paddles a boat while a swan eats numerous fish, only to be eaten by a bigger fish. He stops paddling and uses the paddle as a sail, singing the titular song and playing the sanxian as the boat moves. He arrives at his girlfriend's house, preparing a giant swing for her to descend from the window and play with.

Elsewhere, an aristocrat travels in a carriage driven by a peasant acting like a horse. The payment toll switches from incomprehensible Chinese-like characters to "no sale" to his delight, as he sharpens his extremely long fingernails. He arrives home to find a band playing Chinese music, which he follows by playing the suona like an American trumpet. The boy and his girlfriend then enter, only to find a fire-breathing Chinese dragon which inexplicably appears and traps the girl. The boy tries to fight back with a sword to no avail, leaving with the girl as the dragon gives chase. The boy stuffs a box of fireworks into the dragon's mouth. As they explode in its stomach, some launch outward into the crowd, including one that kills two goldfish. The dragon is killed by the final explosion, with the children hailed as heroes while its skeleton escapes.
