= To Spring =

1936 film by William Hanna and Paul Fennell

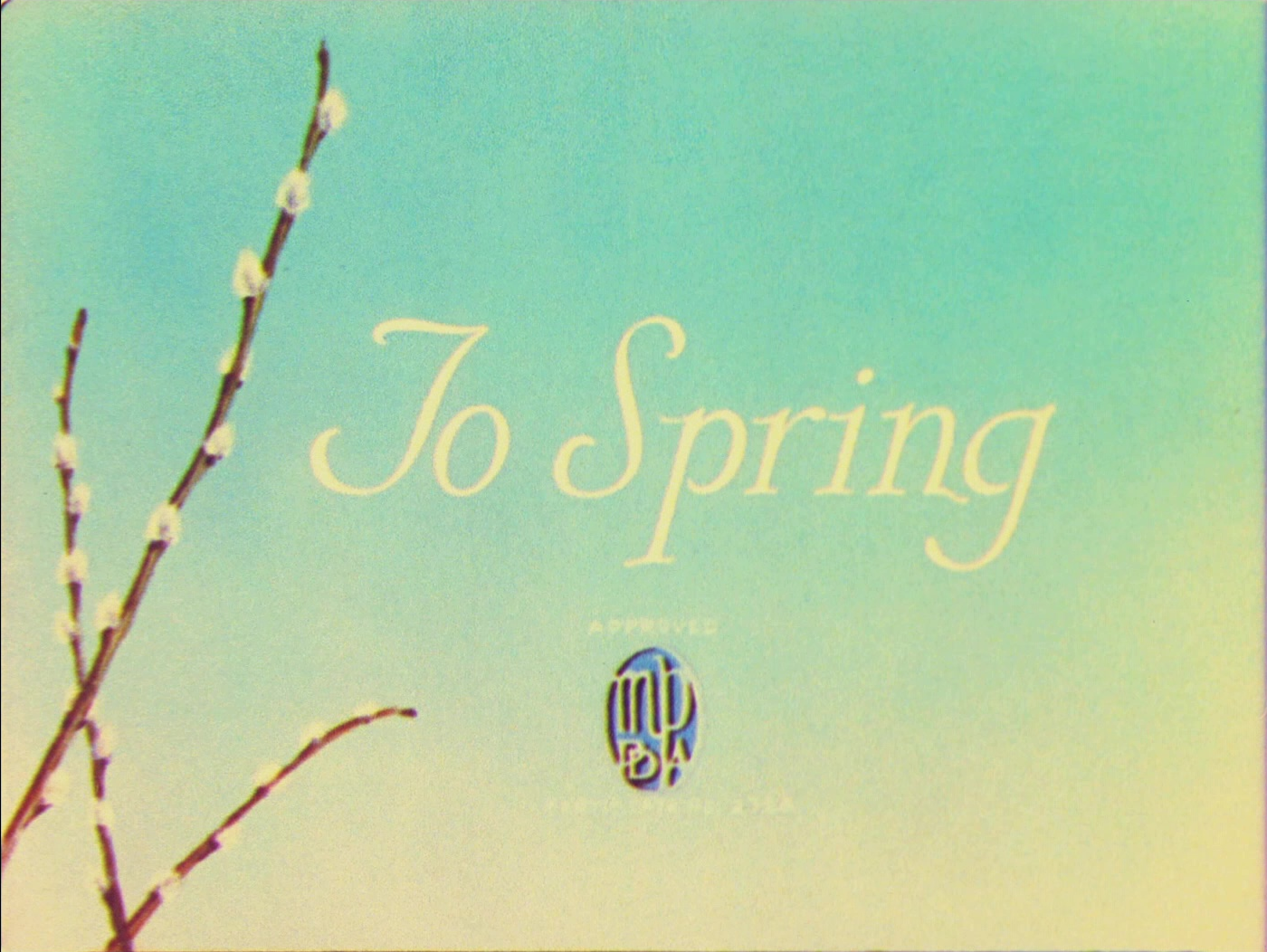
- Title Card
- Directed by: William Hanna; Paul Fennell (both uncredited)
- Produced by: Hugh Harman; Rudolf Ising
- Starring: J. Donald Wilson; Delos Jewkes
- Music by: Scott Bradley
- Color process: Technicolor
- Production companies: Harman-Ising Productions; Metro-Goldwyn-Mayer
- Distributed by: Loew's, Inc.
- Release date: June 4, 1936
- Running time: 9 min
- Country: United States
- Language: English

To Spring is a 1936 American animated short film directed by William Hanna and Paul Fennell. It is the 24th film of the Happy Harmonies series and the only to not be directed by Hugh Harman or Rudolf Ising, who delegated directorial duties to animators Hanna and Fennell as their directorial debuts. It is one of just three MGM cartoons that are in the public domain, and, as of 2026, the only Happy Harmonies short in the public domain.

== Plot ==
The full short, restored.

This short begins with the melting of winter snow as little human-like creatures (either elves or gnomes) below the ground mine colorful crystals. The creatures then process the crystals into liquids that cover the main rainbow colors. This work incites the arrival of spring above on the surface. However, a snowy wind appears and causes issues that hinders the process as the creatures start working harder. In the end, the creatures prevail and spring occurs.

== Production ==
The title is a play on words used to represent the season of spring and action the gnomes must take to wake up and get to work. Lee Blair oversaw the short's vibrant Technicolor process. The short also features the directorial debut of William Hanna, who would later create Tom & Jerry. Hanna co-directed the short with Paul Fennell, but Harman and Ising retained the production credit. The film is in the public domain, because its copyright was not renewed after an initial 28 year term. In addition to writing the music, Scott Bradley conducted the orchestra himself, as he did for all cartoons that he scored. Voice work in the short included Delos Jewkes as the snowy wind, and radio actor J. Donald Wilson voicing the main elf (gnome).

== See also ==
- Jerky Turkey (1945)
- Doggone Tired (1949)
