= Hey-Hey Fever =

1935 film by Hugh Harman

- Title card
- Directed by: Hugh Harman (uncredited)
- Produced by: Hugh Harman; Rudolf Ising
- Music by: Scott Bradley
- Color process: Technicolor
- Production companies: Metro-Goldwyn-Mayer; Harman-Ising Productions
- Distributed by: Loew's, Inc.
- Release date: January 9, 1935
- Running time: 8 minutes
- Country: United States
- Language: English

Hey-Hey Fever is a 1935 American animated comedy short film directed by Hugh Harman. The sixth film in the Happy Harmonies series, it is the 40th cartoon to star Bosko and the final to use his Looney Tunes design, as he was redesigned into a realistic caricature of an African-American boy.

== Plot ==
A homeless and starving Bosko and Bruno walk into a park. He prepares to eat the last sandwiches he had prepared, but gives his share to Bruno so he can be full. He finds a billboard advertising Mother Goose-branded snacks and naps.

Bosko dreams of Mother Goose inviting him into her world, who reveals that the nursery rhyme world is also barren and poverty-stricken. Old Mother Hubbard has no bone for her dog and cannot offer any food. He also finds the old woman who lived in a shoe struggling to handle her multiple children's requests for food. Bosko suggests asking the King for help.

Bosko and the nursery rhyme characters walk to the castle alongside an overanimated Simple Simon, who is out of luck and is enthusiastic enough to join them. Bosko finds the king, Old King Cole, to be so poverty stricken he voluntarily does his own laundry and cannot afford even a pot to cook. He leads the king, his subjects and the other nursery rhyme characters to the Farmer in the Dell in order to plant their own food, relieving the farmer of his responsibilities to his pleasure. After the entire season, Bosko and the nursery rhyme characters enjoy a large feast from the resulting harvest.
