= This Old House (disambiguation) =

This Old House is an American home improvement media franchise, including a television program, spinoff programs, and a magazine.

This Old House, This Ol' House, This Ole House, This Olde House, may also refer to:

- "This Old House" (Roseanne), a 1992 television episode
- "This Ole House", a 1954 song by Stuart Hamblen; covered by Rosemary Clooney (1954) and Shakin' Stevens (1980)
- This Ole House (album), by Shakin' Stevens, 1980
- "This Old House", a 2004 song by Loretta Lynn from Van Lear Rose
- "This Old House", a 1987 song by S-K-B
- This Ol' House, an award winning floral display at the 2019 Jersey Battle of Flowers
- "This Ol' House", a screensaver that is a part of After Dark (software)

== See also ==
- Dat ole Huus (German: That Ole House), Wilsede, Lower Saxony, Germany; a museum
- Dat ole Hus (German: That Ole House), Aukrug, Schleswig-Holstein, Germany; a museum
- The Old House (disambiguation)
- Old House (disambiguation)
