= Bottles (film) =

1936 film by Hugh Harman

- Directed by: Hugh Harman
- Produced by: Hugh Harman; Rudolf Ising
- Starring: Bernice Hansen; Delos Jewkes; Martha Wentworth; Frank Nelson; The Harmonettes; Allan Watson; The Guardsmen Quartet; Dudley Kezelle; Three Rhythm Kings; Rudolf Ising (all uncredited)
- Music by: Debby Ryan (unc.)
- Color process: Technicolor
- Production companies: Metro-Goldwyn-Mayer; Harman-Ising Productions
- Distributed by: Loew's, Inc.
- Release date: January 11, 1936
- Running time: 10 min
- Language: English

Bottles is a 1936 American animated comedy short film directed by Hugh Harman. It is the eighteenth film in the Happy Harmonies series.

== Plot ==
On a dark and stormy night, an elderly pharmacist falls asleep at his stool while mixing poisonous chemicals in a glass bottle. After he falls asleep, the night takes a sudden turn as his poisonous bottle—topped with a "skull and crossbones" stopper as a warning label—suddenly springs to life, becoming a malevolent cackling skeleton. The skeleton douses the pharmacist with chemicals that mysteriously cause him to shrink.

Waking up, the pharmacist sets out to explore his store in his new minuscule form and finds that all of the bottles in the pharmacy have similarly sprung to life, with most of them taking on colorful personalities based on their contents: three baby bottles who behave like crying babies, a bottle of Scotch whiskey who speaks with a Scottish accent next to a bottle of rum, a bottle of Absorbine and Absorbine, Jr. who are a father and son, a container of vanishing cream playfully vanishes and reappears while playing with Absorbine, Jr., a bottle of smelling salts sniffs everyone in close proximity, and a bottle of India ink takes the form of an Indian snake charmer—charming a tube of "Cobra Toothpaste" that becomes a live snake.

With the skeleton nowhere in sight, the pharmacist joins the bottles in their merriment as they all begin to sing, dance and frolic in turn: three bottles of Cuban rum sing a song, a pair of rubber gloves spring to life and tap-dance, a bottle of Carmencita-brand powder and a bottle of toilet water dance a flamenco dance, a pair of salt shakers come to life as Dutch children and go ice-skating on a mirror while a bottle of talcum powder drops imaginary snow on them, a bottle of shaving cream happily takes up a shaving razor, and the pharmacist finally takes up a smoking pipe and begins playing it like a tuba.

The skeleton has secretly formed an alliance with a small cadre of evil bottles that inhabit the darker corners of the shelves: a bottle of witch hazel springs to life as an old witch, and several bottles of spirits of ammonia open up to release a trio of mischievous singing ghosts. As the witch and the skeleton mix a poisonous brew in the pharmacist's beakers and test tubes, the ghosts fly out to snatch up the pharmacist and bring him back to the skeleton. As the skeleton cackles triumphantly, the ghosts hurl the pharmacist into the glass distiller as it bubbles with chemicals. Helpless, the pharmacist is sent hurtling through the twisting tubes of his distiller, chased and ground up in a mincer (which splits him up into tiny duplicates of himself), only to be hurled back into the distiller after the skeleton sucks him up in a syringe. After sending him through the distiller twice, the skeleton finally traps the pharmacist in a glass beaker, laughing as he ties him up with rubber tubing and attacks him with a pair of scissors, threatening to snip him in half.

Finally, when the pharmacist's death seems certain, he wakes up at his stool, unharmed and back to his normal size. Looking to his bottle of poisonous chemicals, the pharmacist realizes that he had merely been having a nightmare, and laughs in relief.
