= Altes Haus =

Altes Haus is German for "old house" and may refer to:

- Old House of Lüneburg, a noble family
- Burgstall Altes Haus, Pommersbrunn, Bavaria
- Hřídelík, a castle in the Czech Republic
- Altes Haus (Hotel Geiger), Bavaria
- Dat ole Huus, a museum in Wilsede, Lower Saxony
- Dat ole Hus, a museum in Aukrug, Schleswig-Holstein
