= Happy Harmonies =

Animated film series

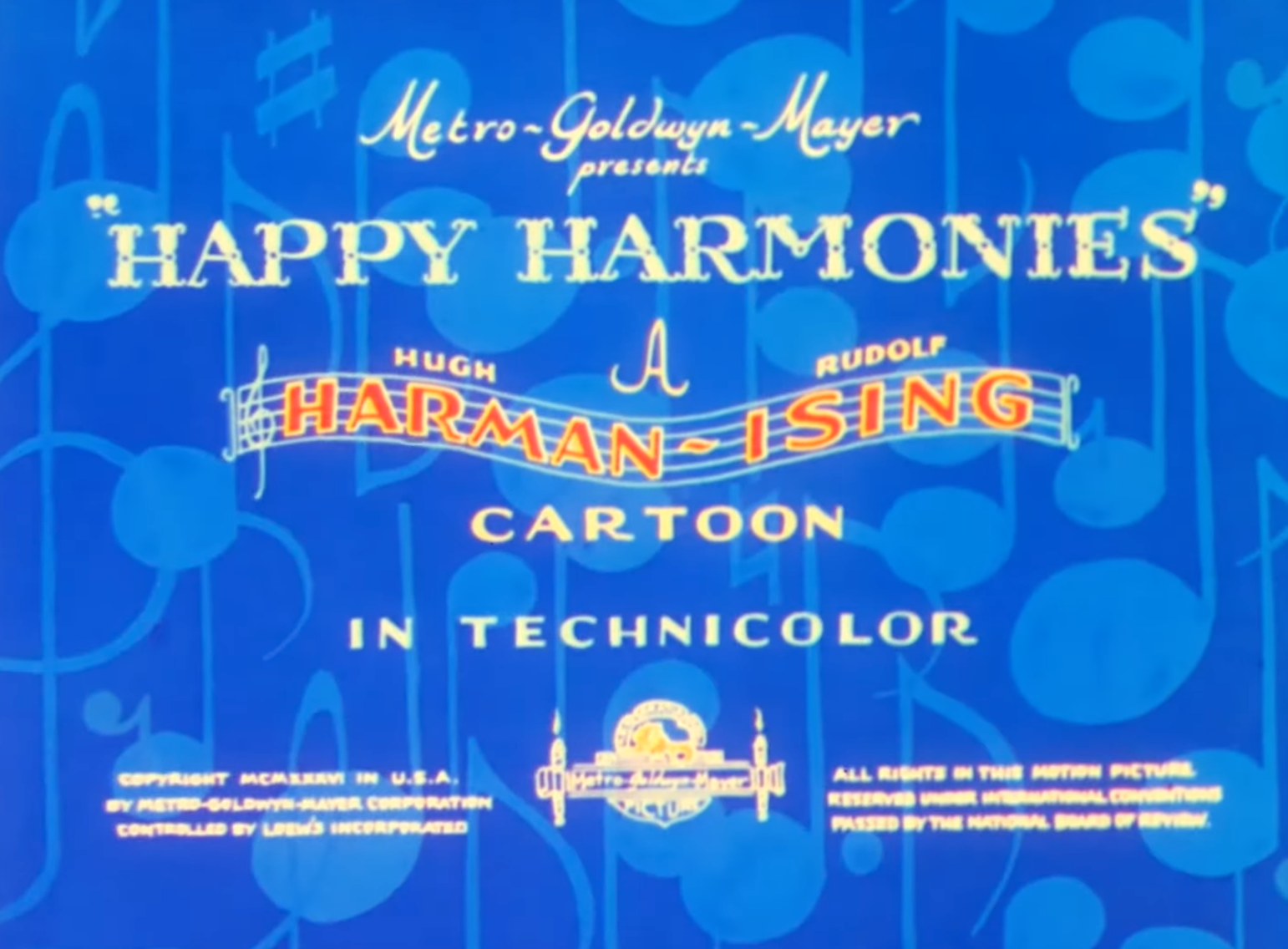
- Title card
- Directed by: Hugh Harman; Rudolf Ising; William Hanna; Paul Fennell
- Produced by: Hugh Harman; Rudolf Ising
- Color process: Technicolor
- Production companies: Metro-Goldwyn-Mayer; Harman-Ising Productions
- Distributed by: Loew's, Inc.
- Running time: 7–10 minutes
- Country: United States
- Language: English

Happy Harmonies is a series of animated short films produced by Harman-Ising Productions and distributed by Metro-Goldwyn-Mayer. Produced in Technicolor, these cartoons were similar in tone to Walt Disney Productions' Silly Symphonies and Leon Schlesinger Productions' Merrie Melodies musical series, which Hugh Harman and Rudolf Ising created. They occasionally featured Bosko, a character who starred in the first Looney Tunes shorts that the duo produced for Leon Schlesinger and Warner Bros. Pictures. After the first two cartoons, the design of Bosko changed from an "inkblot" to a more realistic African-American boy.

The two final titles in the series were originally produced by Harman and Ising as Silly Symphonies cartoons. Disney originally planned to outsource the production of three shorts to Harman-Ising, including a short planned at the studio (Merbabies). Two shorts planned at Harman-Ising, Pipe Dreams and The Little Bantamweight, were rejected due to Roy O. Disney's interference and sold to MGM, who released them as Happy Harmonies. Harman and Ising lost the contract to MGM's newly formed animation division under Fred Quimby the same year. After the failure of comic strip-based cartoons, Quimby was forced to hire Harman and Ising, causing the studio's output to be similar in tone to the Happy Harmonies series until both left in 1941 and 1942.

The original negatives to the Happy Harmonies series were destroyed in the 1978 George Eastman House fire. Harman, who kept master positives of the films, sold prints of individual cartoons to external companies for home and non-theatrical distribution and was sued by MGM in 1946.

== List of cartoons ==
=== 1934 ===
No.	Title	Directed by	Notes	Release date
1	The Discontented Canary	Rudolf Ising	The first non-black-and-white cartoon produced by Harman-Ising for MGM.; Oldest MGM cartoon to be owned by Turner Entertainment Co.; Extra on the DVD of Evelyn Prentice (1934).	September 1, 1934
2	The Old Pioneer	Rudolf Ising	First cartoon to label the name Happy Harmonies on the title card.; Extra on the DVD of Manhattan Melodrama (1934).	September 29, 1934
3	Tale of the Vienna Woods	Hugh Harman	Extra on the DVD of Treasure Island (1934).	October 27, 1934
4	Bosko's Parlor Pranks	Hugh Harman	First appearance of Bosko, Honey, and Bruno in a color cartoon.; Final appearance of Wilber (his only appearance in a color cartoon).; Final appearance of the original Honey design.; Extra on the DVD of Midnight Mary (1933).	November 24, 1934
5	Toyland Broadcast	Rudolf Ising	Extra on the DVD of Sadie McKee (1934).	December 22, 1934

=== 1935 ===
No.	Title	Directed by	Notes	Release date
6	Hey-Hey Fever	Hugh Harman	Final appearance of the original Bosko and Bruno designs.; Extra in the DVD of A Tale of Two Cities (1935).	January 9, 1935
7	When the Cat's Away	Rudolf Ising	First appearance of Little Cheeser.; Extra in the DVD of Night Flight (1933).	February 16, 1935
8	The Lost Chick	Hugh Harman		March 9, 1935
9	The Calico Dragon	Rudolf Ising	Extra in the DVD of Roberta (1935).	March 30, 1935
10	Good Little Monkeys	Hugh Harman	First appearance of the Good Little Monkeys.	April 13, 1935
11	The Chinese Nightingale	Rudolf Ising		April 27, 1935
12	Poor Little Me	Hugh Harman	Extra on the DVD of David Copperfield (1935).	May 11, 1935
13	Barnyard Babies	Rudolf Ising	Final two-strip Technicolor cartoon released by MGM.	May 25, 1935
14	The Old Plantation	Rudolf Ising	First cartoon in three-strip Technicolor not produced by Disney.	September 21, 1935
15	Honeyland	Rudolf Ising	Extra in the DVD of A Tale of Two Cities (1935), along with Hey-Hey Fever.	October 19, 1935
16	Alias St. Nick	Rudolf Ising	Features Little Cheeser.; Extra on the DVD of Sylvia Scarlett (1935).	November 16, 1935
17	Run Sheep, Run!	Hugh Harman	First appearance of Bosko and Bruno's redesigns.	December 14, 1935

=== 1936 ===
No.	Title	Directed by	Notes	Release date
18	Bottles	Hugh Harman	Extra in the DVD of San Francisco (1936).	January 11, 1936
19	The Early Bird and the Worm	Rudolf Ising	Extra in the DVD of After the Thin Man (1936).	February 8, 1936
20	The Old Mill Pond	Hugh Harman	First appearance of the Jazz Frogs.; Extra on the DVD of Born to Dance (1936).	March 7, 1936
21	Two Little Pups	Rudolf Ising	First appearance of the Two Little Pups.	April 4, 1936
22	The Old House	Hugh Harman	Features Bosko, Honey, and Bruno.; First appearance of Honey's redesign.	May 2, 1936
23	The Pups' Picnic	Rudolf Ising	Features the Two Little Pups.	May 30, 1936
24	To Spring	William Hanna, Paul Fennell	Only Happy Harmonies cartoon to have fallen in the public domain in the United States.; Extra on the DVD of Broadway Melody of 1936 (1935).	June 4, 1936
25	Little Cheeser	Rudolf Ising	Features Little Cheeser.; Extra on the DVD of Romeo and Juliet (1936).; Extra on the Blu-Ray of Libeled Lady (1936).	July 11, 1936
26	The Pups' Christmas	Rudolf Ising	Features the Two Little Pups.	December 12, 1936

=== 1937 ===
After Circus Daze, the films are not billed as Happy Harmonies cartoons but are retroactively considered to be part of the series.

No.	Title	Directed by	Notes	Release date
27	Circus Daze	Hugh Harman	Features Bosko and Honey.; Last cartoon billed as a Happy Harmonies.	January 16, 1937
28	Swing Wedding	Hugh Harman	Featuring the Jazz Frogs.	February 13, 1937
29	Bosko's Easter Eggs	Hugh Harman	Features Bosko.; Final appearance of Honey and Bruno.	March 20, 1937
30	Little Ol' Bosko and the Pirates	Hugh Harman	Features Bosko and the Jazz Frogs.	May 1, 1937
31	The Hound and the Rabbit	Rudolf Ising	Extra in the DVD of Double Wedding (1937).	May 29, 1937
32	The Wayward Pups	Rudolf Ising	Final appearance of the Two Little Pups.; Extra in the DVD of The Prisoner of Zenda (1937).	July 10, 1937
33	Little Ol' Bosko and the Cannibals	Hugh Harman	Features Bosko and the Jazz Frogs.	August 28, 1937
34	Little Buck Cheeser	Rudolf Ising	Final appearance of Little Cheeser.; Extra on the DVD of Captains Courageous (1937).	December 15, 1937

=== 1938 ===
No.	Title	Directed by	Notes	Release date
35	Little Ol' Bosko in Bagdad	Hugh Harman	Final appearance of Bosko and the Jazz Frogs.	January 1, 1938
36	Pipe Dreams	Hugh Harman	Features the Good Little Monkeys.	February 5, 1938
37	The Little Bantamweight	Rudolf Ising	Final MGM cartoon not to be produced in-house.	March 12, 1938

== Home media ==
The only official home video release to date containing a significant number of the Happy Harmonies shorts is the Happy Harmonies Cartoon Classics LaserDisc box set. The LaserDisc set was released in 1994 by MGM/UA Home Video, which predated the merger of Turner Broadcasting System with Time Warner in 1996. The four-disc set contains 17 of the 37 Happy Harmonies shorts while the remaining 25 shorts include one side of six Barney Bear cartoons, the 1939 short Peace on Earth and the 1940 animated short The Milky Way. In 1999, MGM paid Time Warner $225 million to end its lease of distributing content owned by Turner Entertainment Co. prior to 1996 (the cartoons are part of MGM's pre-May 1986 library which Turner had purchased). Warner Bros. Home Entertainment has occasionally released Happy Harmonies shorts as extras on Warner Archive Collection releases.
