= Pacific Title & Art Studio =

Defunct American company

- Industry: Title cards Optical effects
- Founded: 1919; 107 years ago
- Founder: Leon Schlesinger

Pacific Title & Art Studio was an American company founded in Hollywood in 1919 by Leon Schlesinger. At first, it primarily produced title cards for silent films. As talking pictures ("talkies") gained popularity in 1929 and 1930, Schlesinger looked for ways to capitalize on the new technology and stay in business, and as a result, the firm moved into general film editing and post-production work.

The company was sold in 2007 for US$23 million, after which it "ran into hard times." The 90-year-old company went into receivership and was expected to be liquidated.

In December 2012, former CEO Phil Feiner–who had been operating PJF Productions in Burbank, California, as a privately owned business since 2008–acquired the "Pacific Title" name after learning that it had become available. PJF now does business using the "Pacific Title" name and its classic logo.
