= The Old House, Ightham Common =

Listed pub in Kent, England

The Old House
- The pub in 2022
- Former names: Old House At Home

General information
- Type: Public house
- Location: Redwell Lane, Ightham Common, Kent, England
- Coordinates: 51°16′48″N 0°16′50″E
- Year built: 17th century
- Renovated: Late 19th century (wing added)
- Owner: Independent

Design and construction
- Designations

Listed Building – Grade II
- Official name: The Old House public house
- Designated: 25 August 1959
- Reference no.: 1396308

The Old House is a Grade II listed public house on Redwell Lane in Ightham Common, a suburban village to the south-west of Ightham in Kent, England. The building consists of a 17th-century timber-framed structure and a late 19th-century extension, which were later combined. It first operated as a beerhouse in 1872 and received a full licence in 1953. Its interior is included in CAMRA's National Inventory of Historic Pub Interiors and is rated three stars, recognising its "outstanding national historic importance".

== History ==
The building comprises a 17th-century timber-framed structure and a late 19th-century return wing, later combined as a public house. The premises began operating as a beerhouse in 1872 and was granted a full licence in 1953. The pub was formerly known as the Old House At Home, although the dates during which this name was in use are not recorded.

On 25 August 1959, the Old House was designated a Grade II listed building. It was included in the Campaign for Real Ale (CAMRA)'s National Inventory of Historic Pub Interiors before the inventory's grading system was revised. Under the revised scheme, it is rated three stars and its interior is regarded as being of "outstanding national historic importance". As of July 2026, the freehold was independently owned.

== Architecture ==
=== Exterior ===
The building has a ground floor made of red brick, with the upper floor finished in hanging tiles. It has a simple tiled roof, with a sloping end on the left and a gable above the projecting section. There are two chimney stacks, one on each roof section. The property has two floors, with five windows on the upper floor and three on the ground floor of the main section. The projecting section has one window. All windows are of the casement type. There are two boarded-up doors in the centre of the main section and a half-glazed door to the left of the projecting section, sheltered by a flat canopy supported by brackets. There is no pub sign, and the lettering on the signboard attached to the right-hand gable has faded and is no longer legible.

=== Interior ===
The pub has a simple two-room layout, consisting of a main bar and a separate saloon, with a small entrance lobby and an off-sales area. The entrance lobby has a parquet floor and leads into the compact off-sales room, which retains a Victorian counter across part of the rear wall, with shelving on either side.

The main bar is located to the left and has a panelled counter and shelving set against a mirrored background. The ceiling is partly beamed and boarded, with a simpler finish to the right, reflecting the extension of the building in 1888. A large brick fireplace with a log fire forms a feature of the room. A Victorian tiled fireplace previously stood in front of it. The parquet flooring was uncovered when the carpet was removed in 2010.

The room to the right is known as the saloon. In the 1970s, an opening was made between the saloon and the off-sales area to create a serving hatch, and a nearby doorway was blocked up. Although some interior features appear traditional, their precise age is uncertain, and the counters, fittings and flooring may date from the 20th century rather than earlier periods.

== See also ==
- Listed buildings in Ightham
