= The Milky Way (1940 film) =

1940 film by Rudolf Ising

- Title card
- Directed by: Rudolf Ising
- Produced by: Rudolf Ising; Fred Quimby (uncredited)
- Starring: Bernice Hansen
- Music by: Scott Bradley
- Color process: Technicolor
- Production company: Metro-Goldwyn-Mayer
- Distributed by: Loew's, Inc.
- Release date: June 22, 1940
- Running time: 8 min
- Country: United States
- Language: English

The Milky Way is a 1940 American animated short film directed by Rudolf Ising. It was released to theaters with the film The Captain Is a Lady in 1940 by Metro-Goldwyn-Mayer. The short explores the adventures of the "three little kittens who lost their mittens", as they explore a dreamland where space is made up entirely of dairy products (for example, the Milky Way is made of milk and the Moon is made of green cheese). It was released as a Gold Medal Reprint in 1958, though the original film remains intact.

The short won the 1940 Oscar for Best Short Subject; Cartoons; it was the first non-Disney film to win the award, with this year being the first year with no nominated Disney cartoons.

== Plot ==
Three kittens, denied milk as punishment for losing their mittens after playing out in the snow, sail up into the Milky Way in a basket lifted by three helium balloons. Their space flight takes them past the Moon, the planet Mars, the Big Dipper, and the Little Dipper, until they reach their destination: the Milky Way.

Once in the Milky Way, they find it a land of natural milk springs and geysers. The kittens proceed to happily gorge themselves on milk, until they get into trouble and risk falling back down to Earth. However, it is then revealed that the whole event was imagined. Their mother comes in to their bedroom to invite them down for supper. The kittens rush excitedly into the kitchen, only to be sickened to see that their supper is milk.

== Home media ==
- Go West (unrestored bonus feature)
- Warner Bros. Home Entertainment Academy Awards Animation Collection: 15 Winners (restored)
- Warner Bros. Home Entertainment Academy Awards Animation Collection, Disc 1 (restored)
- Broadway Melody of 1940, Warner Archive Collection Blu-ray release (restored bonus feature)
