= Merbabies =

1939 film by Rudolf Ising and Vernon Stallings

- Directed by: Rudolf Ising; Vernon Stallings
- Produced by: Walt Disney
- Starring: Pinto Colvig; Leone LeDoux
- Music by: Scott Bradley
- Color process: Technicolor
- Production company: Walt Disney Productions
- Distributed by: RKO Radio Pictures
- Release date: December 9, 1938
- Running time: 8:34
- Country: United States
- Language: English

Merbabies is an American animated short film directed by Rudolf Ising and Vernon Stallings. It was released on December 9, 1938. It is a collaboration between Walt Disney Productions and Harman-Ising Productions and the first Disney cartoon to involve Hugh Harman and Rudolf Ising in a decade; the duo had worked for Walt Disney for his Oswald the Lucky Rabbit series before leaving for Warner Bros. Pictures. Harman and Ising also donated artists to Disney to work on the production of Snow White and the Seven Dwarfs (1937). It is one of the last shorts of the Silly Symphony series; two more shorts were cancelled by RKO and sold to Metro-Goldwyn-Mayer, who completed the shorts under their cartoon department.

== Plot ==
A large number of identical redheaded "merbabies" materialize out of the crashing surf and are summoned to a playground on the ocean floor for an underwater circus in which marine creatures such as seahorses and starfish also take part, beginning with a parade. When a whale blows all the merbabies to the surface inside bubbles, they disappear into the waves from which they came.

== Home media ==
The short was released on the DVD of The Little Mermaid II: Return to the Sea and again on December 19, 2006, on Walt Disney Treasures: More Silly Symphonies, Volume Two. It was released to Disney+ on September 8, 2023, with a 4K restoration.
