= Dat ole Huus =

Museum in Wilsede, Germany

Coordinates: 53°09′51″N 9°57′37″E

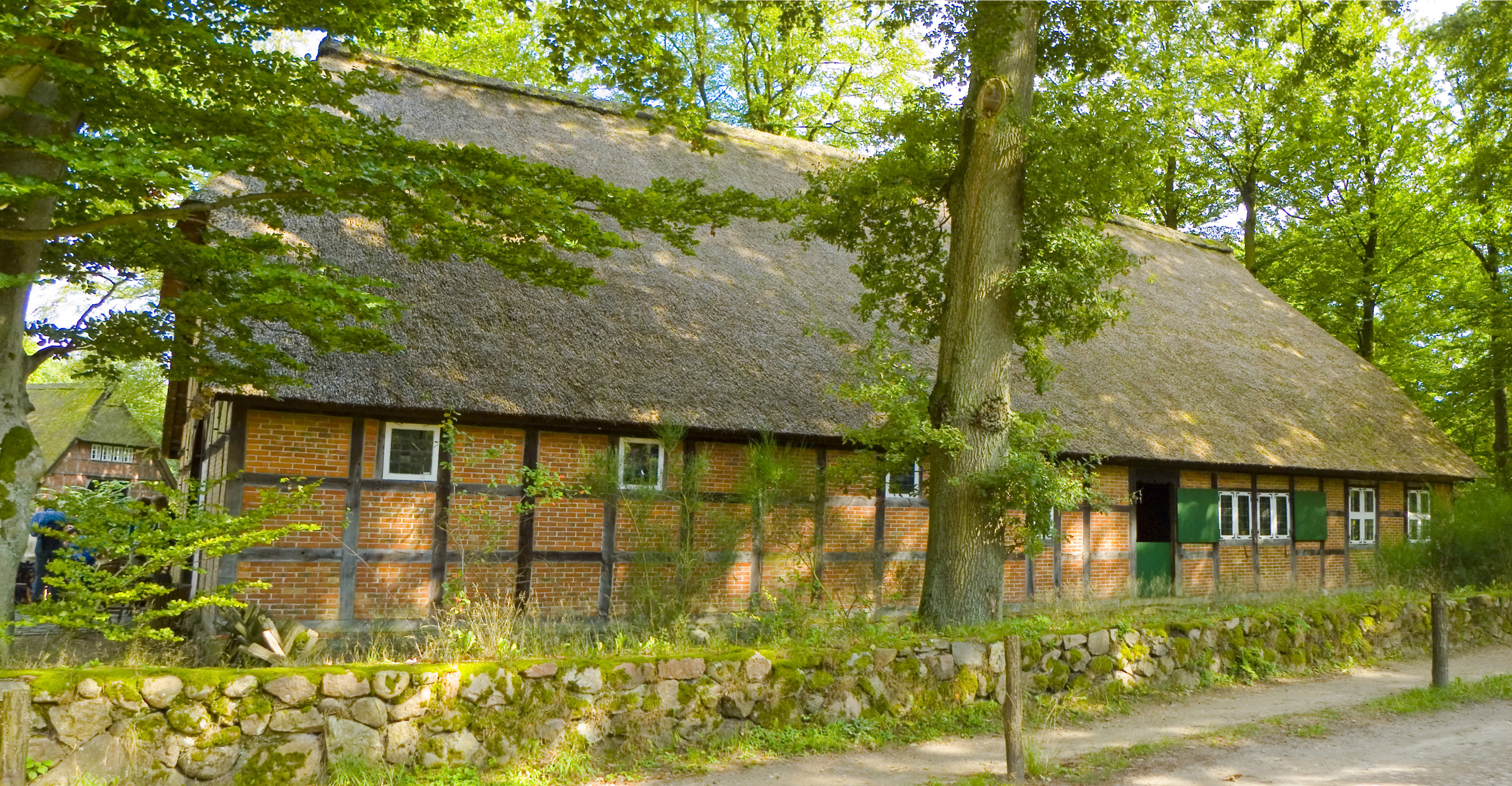
Dat ole Huus farming museum

Dat ole Huus Heath Museum is a local history museum in Wilsede in the German state of Lower Saxony. It was founded in 1907 which makes it one of the oldest open-air museums in Germany. The name is Low German for 'That Ole House'.

== Museum ==
The Nature Conservation Park Society (Verein Naturschutzpark or VNP) together with its foundation, the Lüneburg Heath Nature Conservation Park Foundation (Stiftung Naturschutzpark Lüneburger Heide) are the operators of the museum, its contents being supported by the Kiekeberg Open Air Museum (Freilichtmuseum am Kiekeberg). Since 2004 the Emhoff sheep pen has belonged to the museum. This exhibit provides information about the historic forms of farming used by heath farmers around 1850. It shows a typical house inventory and the tools used on a heath farm.

== Exhibition ==
The exhibition provides information about farming on the Lüneburg Heath around 1850.

== History ==
The house, built in 1742 as a traditional Low German house, is the oldest farmhouse in the Lüneburg Heath Nature Park and typical of the Northern Heath (Nordheide). The founder of the local history museum, Bernhard Dageförde, purchase the building in 1907, had it dismantled in Hanstedt and reconstructed in Wilsede as a farmhouse museum. Dageförde furnished the house with numerous artefacts typical of the Lüneburg Heath.

Even though the Emhoff bears a more recent date of construction, researchers believe that Dat ole Huus actually has a considerably older kitchen area, built around 1540.

The museum is affiliated with the larger open-air museum "Freilichtmuseum am Kiekeberg" (near the southern border of Hamburg). Since 2004 a renovated sheep shed on the "Emhoff" farmstead is used for exhibitions.

== Bibliography ==
- Ulrich Klages: Siedlungen und Baugeschichte. In: Cordes et al. (Hrsg.): Naturschutzgebiet Lüneburger Heide. Geschichte - Ökologie - Naturschutz. Hauschild, Bremen 1997, ISBN 3-931785-36-X.
- Verein Naturschutzpark e.V. (Hrsg.): Wilsede - ein altes Heidedorf. Mundschenk, Soltau 1999.
