= Dat ole Hus =

Museum in Germany

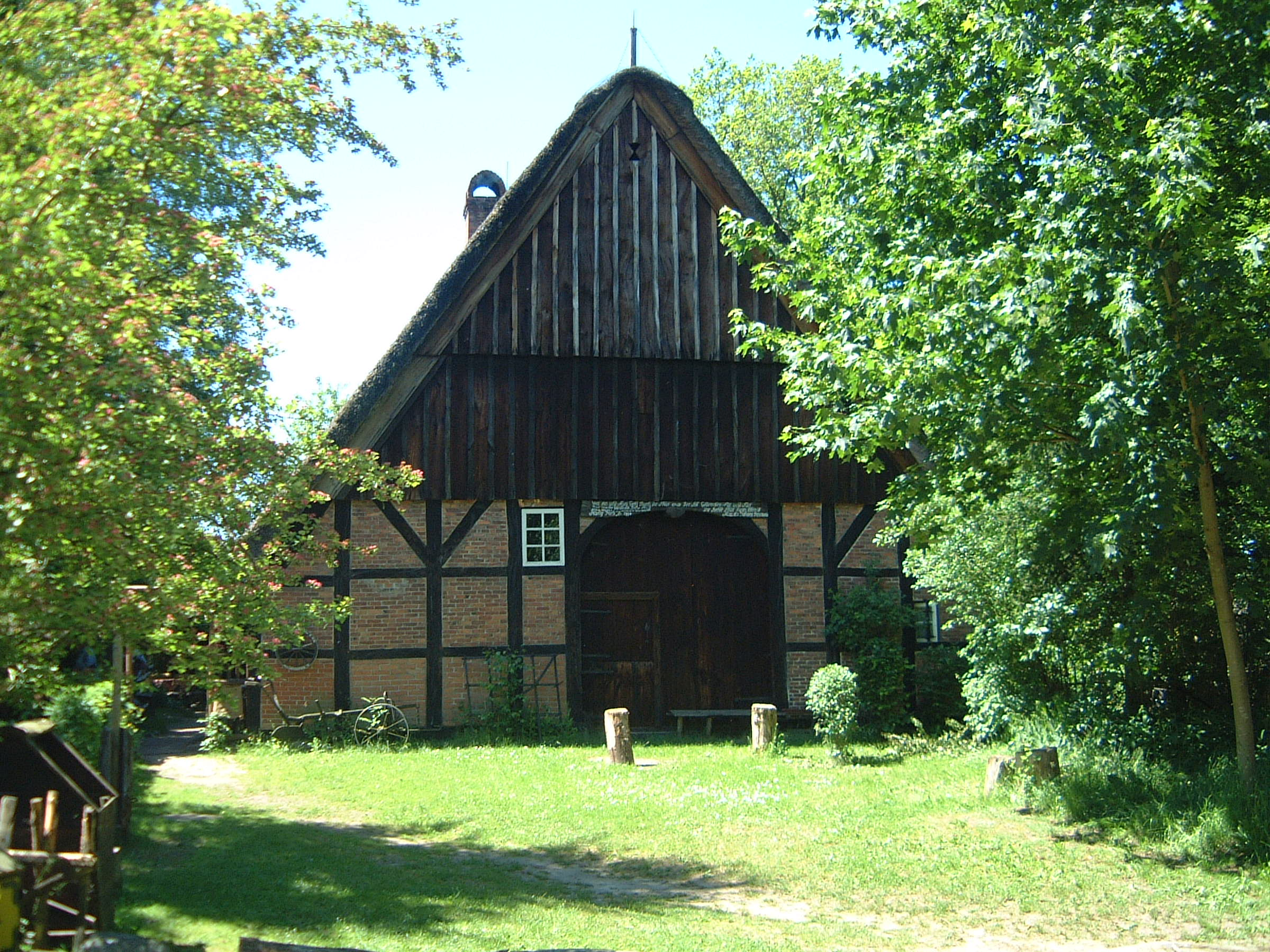
"Dat ole Hus" local history museum

Dat ole Hus ("The old house") is a privately run local history museum in the village of Bünzen in the municipality of Aukrug in Schleswig-Holstein. Its interior rooms portray the living quarters of a farmer from this region from the 18th to the early 20th century.

== History ==
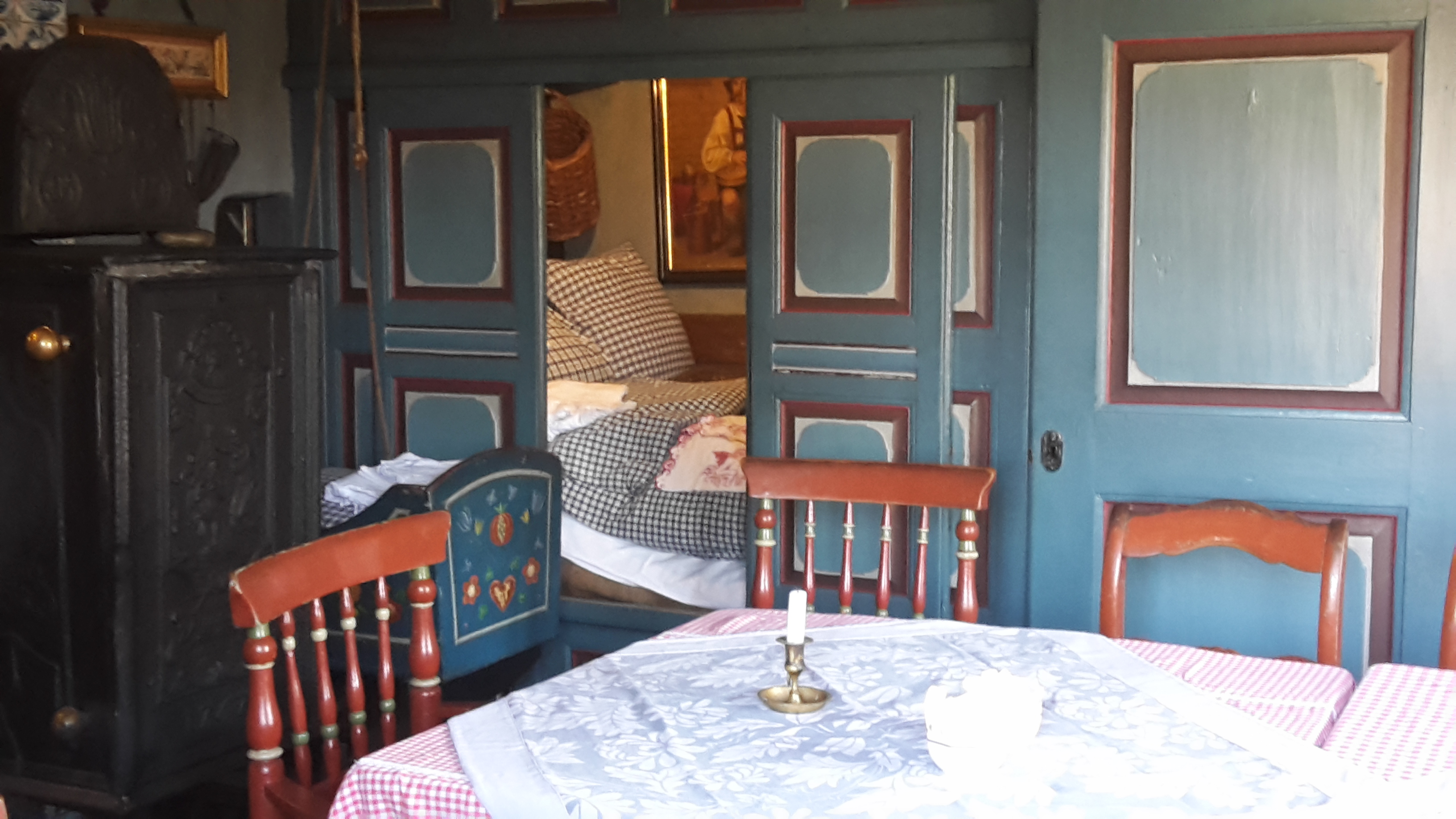
The cottage parlour

The museum is housed in a cottage (Kate) first built around 1700 and rebuilt in 1804 after a fire. In 1961 the husband and wife pair, Edith and Werner Hauschildt, established a local history and open air museum in the cottage and its grounds. In 1970 the couple were granted a licence for a museum cafe serving coffee and Kirschgrütze with whipped cream and hot waffles, baked in an old wood-fired stove.

The municipality initially acquired the property in 2011 after the scheduled end of the lease agreement with the Hauschildt family. In January 2016, a support association for the operation of the museum was founded.

== Bibliography ==
- Georg Reimer: Die Geschichte des Aukrugs, herausgegeben von Heinrich Bünger, 3. erweiterte Auflage, Verlag Möller Söhne, Rendsburg 1978
- Heinrich Asmus, Werner Hauschildt, Peter Höhne: Fortschreibung von "Die Geschichte des Aukrugs" ab 1978 und Nachträge, Aukrug 1995
- Kai Fuhrmann: Niederländische Spuren in Aukrug, in: Dat ole Hus - Volkskunde- und Freilichtmuseum im Naturpark Aukrug, Mitteilungen, Heft 1/Juli 2006, Aukrug 2006 (ISSN 1865-0422)
- Kai Fuhrmann: Ungarische Spuren in Aukrug, in: Dat ole Hus - Volkskunde- und Freilichtmuseum im Naturpark Aukrug, Mitteilungen, Heft 2/Juli 2007, Aukrug 2007 (ISSN 1865-0422)
- Kai Fuhrmann: Russische Spuren in Aukrug, in: Dat ole Hus - Volkskunde- und Freilichtmuseum im Naturpark Aukrug, Mitteilungen, Heft 3/November 2008, Aukrug 2008 (ISSN 1865-0422)
- Kai Fuhrmann: Dat ole Hus - Spurensuche: Geschichte, Einordnung, Konstruktion, in: Dat ole Hus - Volkskunde- und Freilichtmuseum im Naturpark Aukrug, Mitteilungen, Heft 4/Mai 2009, Aukrug 2009 (ISSN 1865-0422)
