= Leon Schlesinger =

American film producer and businessman (1884–1949)

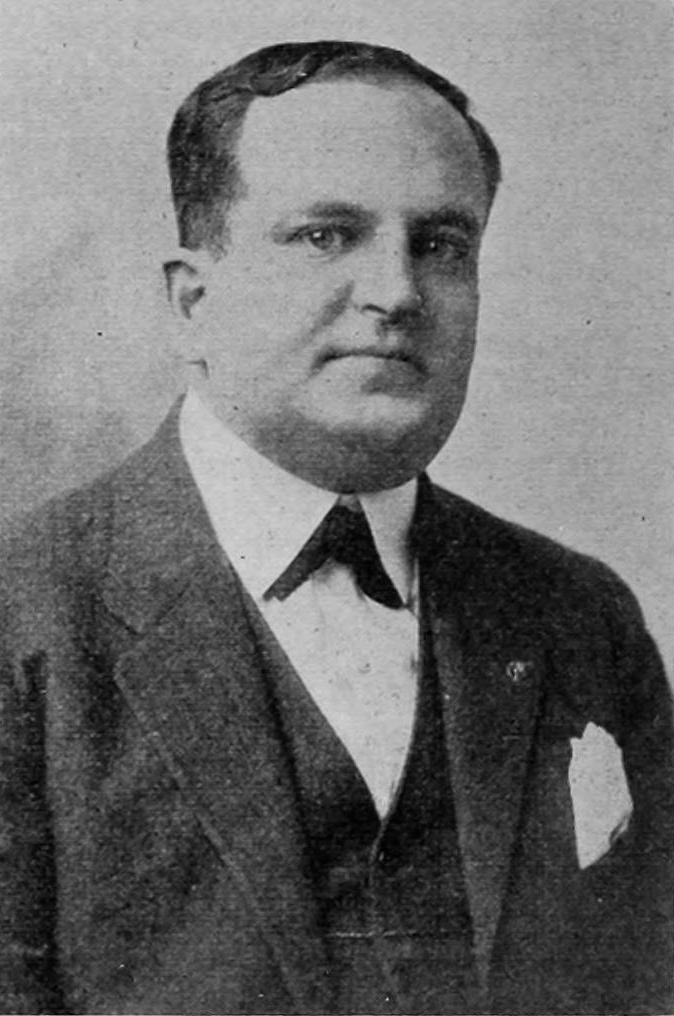
- Leon Schlesinger in 1917
- Born: May 20, 1884; Philadelphia, Pennsylvania, U.S.
- Died: December 25, 1949 (aged 65); Los Angeles, California, U.S.
- Occupation: Producer
- Years active: 1919–1944
- Spouse: Bernice Katz Schlesinger (m. 1909)

Leon Schlesinger (/ˈʃlɛsɪndʒər/ SHLESS-in-jər; May 20, 1884 – December 25, 1949) was an American film producer and businessman who founded Leon Schlesinger Productions, later known as Warner Bros. Cartoons, a prolific producer of animated short films during the Golden Age of American animation.

Schlesinger was a distant relative of the Warner brothers and was closely associated with Warner Bros. Pictures throughout his career. As head of his own studio, Schlesinger produced the Looney Tunes and Merrie Melodies cartoons from 1933, when Schlesinger took over production from his subcontractors, Hugh Harman and Rudolf Ising of Harman-Ising Productions, until 1944, when Warners acquired the studio.

== Early life and career ==
Leon Schlesinger was born to a Jewish family in Philadelphia, Pennsylvania, on May 20, 1884. On June 9, 1909, Schlesinger married Bernice K. Schlesinger (née Leona Katz, September 15, 1882 – May 8, 1966). (Note: Bernice K. Schlesinger was born on September 15, 1882 in Mattoon, Illinois and died on May 8, 1966 in Los Angeles, California. She was interred inside The Hollywood Forever Cemetery, buried under Leon Schlesinger.)

After Schlesinger worked in theaters as an usher, songbook agent, actor, and manager, including at the Palace Theatre in Buffalo, New York, he founded Pacific Title & Art Studio in 1919, where most of his business was producing title cards for silent films. As talking pictures ("talkies") replaced silents in 1929 and 1930, Schlesinger looked for ways to capitalize on the new technology and stay in business. Some film historians, like Tom Sito, claim that he helped finance Warner Bros.'s first talkie, The Jazz Singer (1927). He then secured a contract with the studio to produce its brand-new Looney Tunes series, and he signed a group of former Winkler Pictures animators led by Hugh Harman and Rudolf Ising to create these cartoons, with their character Bosko as the star.

== Schlesinger's westerns ==
In 1932 and 1933 Leon Schlesinger produced six B-movie westerns for Warner Bros. starring John Wayne.

- Ride Him, Cowboy (1932)
- Haunted Gold (1932)
- The Big Stampede (1932)
- The Telegraph Trail (1933)
- Somewhere in Sonora (1933)
- The Man from Monterey (1933)

Schlesinger spent under $30,000 each because he did not need elaborate action sequences. Instead, he used silent action footage of cowboy star Ken Maynard and his horse Tarzan.

"I later thought Leon's cartoons were better than the horse operas he put me in," Wayne recalled in later years. "Those westerns I made at Warner Bros. were remakes of old Ken Maynard films, and all the big scenes like cattle herds and Indian attacks were taken straight from the original Maynard films. So I had to dress up to look like Ken Maynard because a lot of the old footage they inserted had shots of Maynard in the distance. I really hated that."

Schlesinger's westerns were so cheap that Warner Bros. wouldn't have the Warner name associated with them, nor would Warner allow its sister company First National to distribute them. The studio ultimately revived an old brand name it still owned, Vitagraph, and marketed the "Four Star Westerns" as Vitagraph releases.

A few years later, Warners remade these budget Westerns with singing cowboy Dick Foran. In 1939, when John Wayne attracted attention with his new films Stagecoach and Allegheny Uprising, the studio re-released the six Wayne westerns, and rebranded them as full-fledged Warner Bros. productions. The Wayne westerns continued to play in theaters long after their initial release; Haunted Gold came back to theaters in 1956.

== Schlesinger as businessman ==
Schlesinger was a shrewd businessman with a keen eye for talent. When Harman and Ising left Warner Bros. with the rights to Bosko in 1933, Schlesinger set up his own studio on the Warner Bros. Sunset Boulevard lot at the corner of Van Ness and Fernwood. He wooed animators away from other studios, including some of those who had once worked at Harman-Ising Productions. One of these was Friz Freleng, whom Schlesinger promoted to oversee production of Looney Tunes and to develop the sister series, Merrie Melodies. Former Harman-Ising animator Bob Clampett was also hired. Schlesinger's recruiting of Robert McKimson, Tex Avery, Chuck Jones, and Frank Tashlin further increased the quality of the studio's output.

Schlesinger later hired composer Carl W. Stalling and voice actor Mel Blanc, and collectively these men created such famous characters as Porky Pig, Daffy Duck, and Bugs Bunny. Schlesinger largely took a "hands off" approach to the animation unit, allowing his directors freedom to create what they wished, provided that the resulting films were successful. Schlesinger sold Pacific Title & Art Studio in 1935 to concentrate on his animation studio.

=== Business practices ===
Schlesinger was known for his hard-nosed business practices, exemplified by a wry sense of humor comparable to that of his staff. His animators worked in a dilapidated studio (Avery's people were briefly assigned to a bungalow they dubbed "Termite Terrace"), and Schlesinger briefly shut down the studio in mid-1941 when unionized employees demanded a pay raise. On another occasion, he boycotted the Academy Awards for what he claimed was preferential treatment for the Walt Disney Productions. He also farmed some of the Looney Tunes out to brother-in-law Ray Katz for tax breaks. According to Thomas McKimson, Schlesinger personally delivered paychecks to every employee while wearing cologne of an undesirable scent.

Schlesinger was also known among his animators for his lisp. One often-repeated story states that Mel Blanc patterned the voices of both Daffy Duck and Sylvester the Cat on Schlesinger. However, in Mel Blanc's autobiography, That's Not All Folks!, he contradicts that conventional belief, writing "It seemed to me that such an extended mandible would hinder his speech, particularly on words containing an s sound. Thus 'despicable' became 'desthpicable'." Daffy's slobbery, exaggerated lisp was developed over time. Schlesinger was a fan of Porky Pig and would regularly demand his presence in shorts to absurd levels, despite Porky being intended as a caricature of him; he also eagerly participated in Christmas gag reels produced by the studio in 1939 and 1940, which portrayed him and the rest of the staff to be comedically inept in their positions.

== Appearance in short films ==
Schlesinger appeared as himself in Freleng's short You Ought to Be in Pictures (1940), that combines live action with animation. In this short, Mel Blanc voices Daffy Duck, Porky Pig, and all other characters (including the live human studio security guard), except Schlesinger, who dubbed his own voice because the studio did not have a sound camera. In the film the stuttering Porky is unable to pronounce "Mr. Schlesinger," eventually giving up and addressing him as "Leon". As with other Warner cartoon staffers, Schlesinger appeared in caricature form in such cartoons as Hollywood Steps Out, Nutty News, and Russian Rhapsody.

== Later life and career ==
Schlesinger remained head of the animation studio until 1944 when he sold his assets to Warner Bros. Eddie Selzer assumed Schlesinger's position as producer. He continued to market the characters and headed Warners's Theater Services unit.

Schlesinger was an avid racehorse fan and was a director of the Western Harness Racing Association.

Schlesinger died from a viral infection on Christmas Day, 1949. He is interred in the Beth Olam Mausoleum inside the Hollywood Forever Cemetery in Hollywood, California.
