= Scott Bradley (composer) =

American composer (1891–1977)

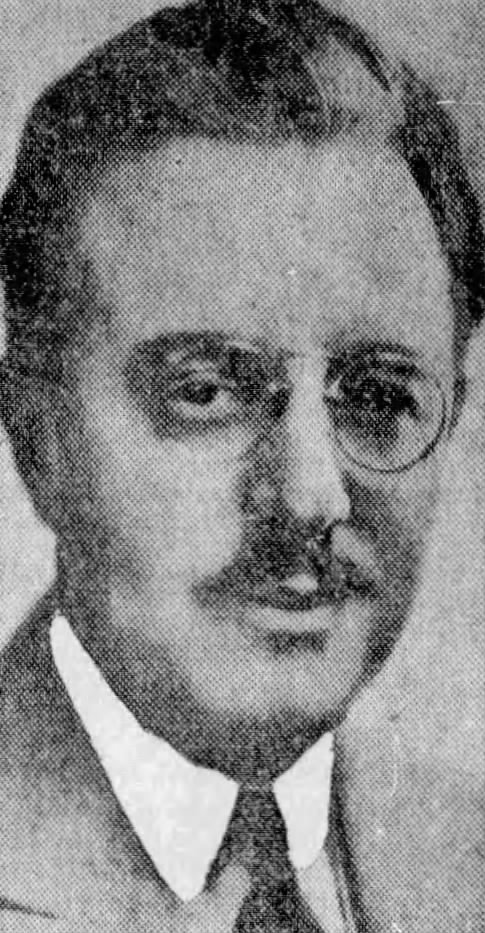
- Bradley, c. 1930
- Born: Walter Scott Bradley; November 26, 1891; Russellville, Arkansas, U.S.
- Died: April 27, 1977 (aged 85); Los Angeles, California, U.S.
- Occupations: Composer; Arranger
- Years active: 1931–1957
- Employers: The Iwerks Studio (1931-1934); Harman-Ising Productions (1934-1937); MGM Cartoons (1937-1957); Walter Lantz Studios (1938)
- Spouse: Myrtle Aber (m. 1934)
- Musical career
- Genres: Film score; Cartoon

Walter Scott Bradley (November 26, 1891 – April 27, 1977) was an American composer, pianist, arranger, and conductor.

Bradley is best remembered for scoring MGM's theatrical cartoons, including those starring Tom and Jerry, Barney Bear, Screwy Squirrel, Droopy, George and Junior and many one-off cartoons.

== Biography ==
=== Early life and career ===
In an autobiographical sketch, Bradley noted that he began his career performing with and later conducting theatre orchestras in Houston, Texas. He studied organ and harmony with Horton Corbett, the choir director of Houston's Christ Church Cathedral, but was "otherwise entirely self-taught in composition and orchestration." (Years later, when he was already established in Hollywood, he sought to improve his technique by studying privately with MGM colleague Mario Castelnuovo-Tedesco). In 1926, Bradley moved to Los Angeles to conduct programs over KHJ Radio, an activity that led to his growing involvement in animation at the start of the talkie era. He was a staff musician for Walt Disney (1929) and the Ub Iwerks studio (1930–1934), then became music director for Hugh Harman and Rudolf Ising, who were hired to produce cartoon shorts for MGM. Harman and Ising valued his work, an improvement over Frank Marsales', to the point they requested Fred Quimby to hire him after they moved to MGM's in-house studio. After MGM established its own cartoon department in 1937, Bradley was hired permanently and remained with the company for twenty years. Bradley also composed the music for the cartoon Baby Kittens (1938) for Walter Lantz Productions.

During the 1930s, Bradley also composed music for the concert hall, including the tone poems The Valley of the White Poppies (1931), The Headless Horseman (1932), and the oratorio Thanatopsis (1934), based on the poem by William Cullen Bryant. His most notable success was Cartoonia (1938), a four-movement orchestral suite of his MGM work, premiered by Pierre Monteux with the San Francisco Symphony. It was an early expression of Bradley's belief that cartoon music was an art form of great potential.

As was common practice in scores for animation, Bradley's early style incorporated fragments of popular and traditional melodies. By the mid-1940s, however, his compositions and orchestrations had become more original and complex, occasionally utilizing the twelve-tone technique devised by Arnold Schoenberg; the first being the 1944 Tom and Jerry cartoon Puttin' on the Dog. Other influences were Béla Bartók, Igor Stravinsky and Paul Hindemith. Sight & Sound magazine quoted concertmaster Lou Raderman's mock complaint: "Scott writes the most blank-blank-blank difficult fiddle music in Hollywood … He is going to break my fingers!" Bradley would also compose music for two MGM films, Courage of Lassie (with Bronislau Kaper, 1946) and The Yellow Cab Man (1950).

Bradley expressed considerable pride in his "funny music" and believed scoring for animation offered far more possibilities to the composer than live-action films. About his score for MGM's Puttin' on the Dog, he later wrote "I hope Dr. Schoenberg will forgive me for using his system to produce funny music, but even the boys in the orchestra laughed when we were recording it." The conductor Simon Rattle has specifically highlighted the influence of the Klaus-Narr passages in Schoenberg's Gurrelieder on Bradley's compositions.

According to conductor Peter Morris, Bradley's music is usually scored by a orchestra consisting between twenty to twenty five musicians (as opposed to Carl Stalling's fifty-piece orchestra at Warner Bros.), resulting in some instruments having a more prominent timbre then others, such as trumpets, percussion, and violins. While working with William Hanna and Joseph Barbera, he would often incorporate classical, pop, and jazz music in their Tom and Jerry shorts, on top of composing original melodies. He was, however, less fond of working with Tex Avery, who often encouraged Bradley to use old folk-tune music for cues akin to Stalling. During an interview with Milton Grey, he said that "Tex Avery didn’t like my music. We disagreed a lot on what kind of music was appropriate for his cartoons. His ideas on music were so bad that I had to put a stop to it.... I gave in to him for a while, but finally I went down to see Quimby in his office and complained.... And Quimby backed me up." In 1954, MGM terminated his weekly contract but retained his services as a freelancer, paying him $1,000 per film. This arrangement lasted until MGM closed its cartoon department in 1957, after which Bradley retired.

=== Legacy ===
By the late 1980s, Bradley's reputation had been overshadowed by that of Stalling, but experienced a resurgence at the start of the 21st century. The first Bradley soundtrack album, Tom and Jerry & Tex Avery Too!, received a limited-edition release in 2006 and the "Cartoonia" suite was revived in a performance by the Cleveland Youth Orchestra in 2012. The following year, "Tom and Jerry at MGM", a six-minute orchestral suite of Bradley cues reconstructed by Peter Morris and John Wilson, received its world premiere at a BBC Proms concert in London. Simon Rattle also chose this suite for the Berlin Philharmonic Waldbühne concert in 2015. Rattle presented it again in June 2018 at his last subscription concert of the Berlin Philharmonic as a chief conductor.

== Personal life ==
Bradley married Myrtle Aber on December 2, 1934, in a small ceremony. He died on April 27, 1977, in Chatsworth, California, and is buried at Chatsworth's Oakwood Memorial Park Cemetery.

== Bibliography ==
- Goldmark, Daniel (2006): "Cartoon Concerto". Liner notes for Tom and Jerry & Tex Avery Too! Volume 1: The 1950s. Film Score Monthly CD Vol. 9 No. 17.
- Goldmark, Daniel (2005): "Tunes for 'Toons: Music and Hollywood Cartoons." University of California Press.
- Goldmark, Daniel and Yuval Taylor (eds.) (2002): The Cartoon Music Book. A Capella Books.
- Maltin, Leonard (1987): Of Mice and Magic: A History of American Animated Cartoons. Penguin Books.
- McCarty, Clifford (2000): Film Composers in America: a Filmography, 1911–1970. Oxford University Press.
- Morris, Peter (2007): Playing Cat and Mouse in BBC Music Magazine, March 2007. p44-48. British Broadcasting Corporation.
- Morris, Peter (2016): Humour Between the Keys in Sounding Funny (2016). Equinox Publishing.
