= Rudolf Ising =

American animator, film producer, film director (1903–1992)

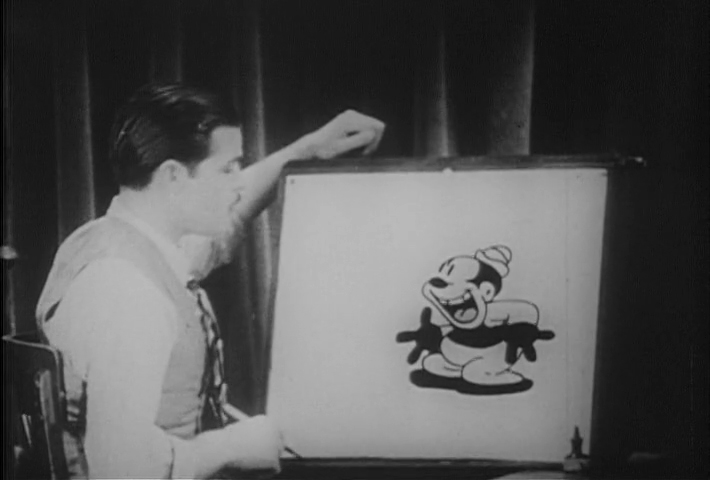
- Ising with Bosko in Bosko, the Talk-Ink Kid (1929)
- Born: Rudolf Carl Ising; August 7, 1903; Kansas City, Missouri, U.S.
- Died: July 18, 1992 (aged 88); Newport Beach, California, U.S.
- Resting place: Pacific View Memorial Park, Newport Beach
- Years active: 1922–1960
- Known for: Harman-Ising Productions
- Spouses: Maxine Jennings (m. 1936; div. 1940); Cynthia Westlake (m. 1941)
- Children: 1
- Military career
- Allegiance: United States
- Branch: United States Army; Army Air Forces; First Motion Picture Unit
- Service years: 1942–1946
- Rank: Major
- Unit: 18th AAF Base Unit
- Conflicts: World War II

Rudolf Carl Ising (/ˈaɪzɪŋ/ EYE-zing; August 7, 1903 – July 18, 1992) was an American animator, film producer, film director, voice actor, and United States Army major. An early collaborator of Walt Disney and a key figure in the golden age of American animation, Ising and his longtime collaborator Hugh Harman founded Harman-Ising Productions in 1929. Harman-Ising created the Looney Tunes and Merrie Melodies cartoon series for Warner Bros. Pictures, and Warners' first cartoon star, Bosko, setting the foundation for what would later become the Warner Bros. Cartoons studio.

Moving the distribution of their cartoons to Metro-Goldwyn-Mayer in 1934, Harman and Ising started the Happy Harmonies series. This led, after the 1938 termination of their contract, to the creation of the MGM cartoon department, where Harman and Ising would both work as producer/directors. At MGM, Ising created and initially voiced Barney Bear, and in 1940 produced William Hanna and Joseph Barbera's first cartoon, Puss Gets the Boot, which introduced the cat and mouse characters later known as Tom and Jerry.

Ising left MGM in 1942 to join the United States Army Air Forces, where he ran the animation unit of the Army's First Motion Picture Unit – producers of animated training films for use by the military during World War II.

== Biography ==
=== Early career with Walt Disney ===
Rudolf Carl Ising was born in Kansas City, Missouri on August 7, 1903. Ising spent his teenage years working at a photographic studio before joining Walt Disney's Laugh-O-Gram Studio alongside other Kansas City youths. He soon became close friends with one of his Laugh-O-Gram colleagues, Hugh Harman, with whom he attempted to start a new animation business after the Laugh-O-Gram Studio went bankrupt and Walt Disney moved to Los Angeles in 1923.

Ising and Harman's plans for a series of Arabian Nights-inspired cartoons via their own Arabian Nights Studio fell through, and in 1924 they moved to Hollywood to rejoin Disney, who'd started a new cartoon studio to produce the live-action/animation hybrid Alice Comedies. Several other Laugh-O-Gram alumni such as Ub Iwerks, Carman Maxwell and Isadore "Friz" Freleng would also make the move from Missouri to California.

By 1927, Disney's team was animating the Oswald the Lucky Rabbit cartoon series for producer Charles Mintz's Winkler Pictures and distributor Universal Pictures. Ising, Harman, and many of their colleagues became disgruntled working for the mercurial Disney. When they were approached by Mintz's brother-in-law George Winkler to start a new studio under Mintz - who intended to fire Disney and make the Oswalds himself - they accepted. Of their Kansas City colleagues, only Ub Iwerks stayed with Walt Disney after the latter finally fell out with Mintz in February 1928. Iwerks and Disney would move on to launch a new cartoon character, Mickey Mouse, by the end of the year.

=== Winkler Pictures and "Bosko the Talk-Ink Kid" ===
Ising, Harman, Freleng, and an industry veteran recruited from New York, Walter Lantz, became Oswald's directors at the new Winkler Pictures studio, which opened in May 1928 with George Winkler as their producer and general manager. Universal was dissatisfied with the quality of their output, and in April 1929, just under a year later, terminated the Mintz contract. The Winkler staffers were laid off - Mintz would bring his Krazy Kat unit from the East Coast to take over their building, and Lantz signed on with Universal to co-produce and co-direct Oswald cartoons with Bill Nolan.

Ising and Harman decided to make a second attempt at starting their own cartoon studio, Harman-Ising Productions. In late 1929, they produced a brief proof-of-concept film featuring Bosko, a "little Negro boy" character created by Harman just before he and Ising left the Disney studio. The film, marketed as "Bosko, the Talk-Ink Kid" (playing up the short's focus on dialogue and music at a time when the film industry was still converting to sound), features a live-action Ising as a cartoonist who draws the animated Bosko, but is pestered by the character before Ising sends him back into the inkwell.

=== Working at Harman-Ising for Warner Bros. and MGM ===
In January 1930, Harman-Ising Productions gained a contract with Leon Schlesinger, an independent film producer who then contracted with Warner Bros. Pictures to provide the distributor with a series of Bosko cartoons. The first, 1930's Sinkin' in the Bathtub, launched the Looney Tunes series - the series name being derivative of Disney's recently launched Silly Symphonies cartoons. The cartoons were successful enough, particularly in their focus on music mostly licensed from Warner-owned music publishing catalogs, that Warners ordered a spin-off series, to be called Merrie Melodies, after the first year.

With Harman focused on the Bosko Looney Tunes, Ising became the head director of the Merrie Melodies. The Merrie Melodies cartoons were contractually required to feature a Warners song in each short, which would also be titled after the featured tune. As a result, Ising's Merrie Melodies cartoons share titles with popular Warner-controlled compositions such as Smile, Darn Ya, Smile!, One Step Ahead of My Shadow, and We're in the Money. The first five Merrie Melodies featured recurring characters; the first of these, Foxy, bore such a resemblance to Mickey Mouse that Walt Disney asked Ising to stop using the character after three shorts. Eventually, Ising settled into a pattern of one-shot musical shorts for the series. His voice was often featured on several of these early cartoons, mostly as deep-voiced villains or caricaturing celebrities of the era.

Budgetary disagreements severed Harman-Ising Productions' relationship with Schlesinger by 1933 - they wanted more money per cartoon with their next contract renewal, and Warners was reducing the amount of its advances to Schlesinger. When their contract ended in August 1933, Schlesinger started his own studio, which would become the famous Warner Bros. Cartoons studio of Bugs Bunny, Daffy Duck, and more. Harman-Ising did work as subcontractors on a number of cartoons for New York's Van Beuren Studios and attempted, without pay, its own adaptation of The Nutcracker. In February 1934, Ising and Harman signed a new contract with Metro-Goldwyn-Mayer to create a new series of cartoons under the Happy Harmonies moniker, replacing the output of their old Disney colleague Ub Iwerks' Animated Pictures.

Just as they had done for Warner Bros., Ising made one-shot musical comedy cartoon shorts, while Harman mostly directed shorts featuring a revamped version Bosko. Ising's The Old Plantation, released in September 1935, was the first non-Disney cartoon filmed in the new three-strip Technicolor process. Walt Disney had signed an exclusive contract which prevented other cartoon producers from using the three-strip process (not counting Ted Esbaugh's unreleased The Wizard of Oz cartoon in 1933).

MGM decided to end its contract with Harman-Ising in 1937 over money disputes, and delivered their last Happy Harmony, The Little Bantamweight, in early 1938. The duo kept their studio afloat by doing work as sub-contractors for their old employer Walt Disney, producing the Silly Symphony cartoon Merbabies and doing ink-and-paint and background artwork for Disney's first animated feature, Snow White and the Seven Dwarfs. Without new work coming in, Ising and Harman filed for bankruptcy in July 1938 - only to be offered jobs by MGM after a year of failed projects at their new in-house cartoon department.

=== Working at MGM ===
Ising and Harman joined MGM in October 1938 as producer/directors, assigned to run separate production units, under MGM animation head Fred Quimby, a veteran executive from the studio's live-action shorts department. As the duo's brand of cartoons featuring cutesy characters with light plots had fallen out of favor by the end of the 1930s, Ising opted to adapt with the times and created Barney Bear, based partly on and voiced by himself. Barney Bear first appeared in The Bear that Couldn't Sleep (1939) and would star in his own series of cartoons at MGM through the early 1950s. One of Ising's one-shot shorts as producer/director, The Milky Way (1940), became the first non-Disney film to win the Academy Award for Best Short Subject (Cartoons).

Among the animators and directors who worked in the Ising unit were George Gordon, Mexican cartoonist Gus Arriola, Jerry Brewer, Bob Allen, and a recently formed duo of animators, Harman-Ising alumnus William Hanna and former Terrytoons animator Joseph Barbera. Hanna and Barbera's first directorial foray, 1940's Puss Gets the Boot, introduced the cat-and-mouse pair later known as Tom and Jerry. Ising's role in the production - on which he was given the only on-screen credit as "A Rudolf Ising Production" - was limited to helping Hanna and Barbera with writing the story. By the time Puss Gets the Boot was completed in late 1939, Ising had fallen out with the duo and Quimby had given Hanna and Barbera their own production unit.

=== Later years ===
In October 1942, Ising left MGM to join the United States Army not long after the U.S. entered World War II. He was commissioned as a major in 1943 and assigned to the Army Air Forces' First Motion Picture Unit as head of its animation department. Under his supervision, the animation department, staffed by many of Ising's enlisted colleagues formally of the Schlesinger and MGM studios, produced classified animated infographics and training films. A separate motion picture unit, the 834th Signal Service Photographic Detachment under Colonel Frank Capra, supervised production of the Private Snafu cartoons, outsourced to Schlesinger/Warner Bros. and supervised by Major Theodor Seuss Geisel, better known as Dr. Seuss.

After the war, Ising formed his own production company. In 1951, Ising hired Hugh Harman after following the closure of Hugh Harman Productions, which Harman had formed in 1942 after leaving MGM, reestablishing Harman-Ising Studios.

Ising's final major work was a failed TV pilot named Sir Gee Whiz on the Other Side of The Moon in 1960. Harman-Ising Studios closed in the early 1960s, after which Ising took to painting, mostly to give Harman, who had fallen into hard times, some financial support. After decades of relative obscurity, the semi-retired Ising became a well-known name to animation fans through interviews made by Mark Kausler among other historians. He was honored by the International Animated Film Association (ASIFA) in 1976.

=== Personal life ===
Rudolf Ising was married twice. His first wife was Maxine Jennings, whom he married in 1936 and divorced in 1940. In 1941, he married Cynthia Westlake, with whom he remained until his death. Ising and Westlake had one child, their son Rudolf Ising Jr.

Ising died of cancer in Newport Beach on July 18, 1992. He is buried at Pacific View Memorial Park in California.

== See also ==
- Harman-Ising Productions
