= Harman-Ising Productions =

American animation studio

- Industry: Animation
- Founded: 1929; 97 years ago
- Founders: Hugh Harman; Rudolf Ising
- Defunct: July 1938; 88 years ago
- Fate: Bankrupt
- Successors: Studio: MGM Cartoons (where the former staff went to after the studio closed); Hugh Harman Productions (independent successor founded by Harman after leaving MGM); Library: Warner Bros. Entertainment (through Turner Entertainment Co.)
- Headquarters: Los Angeles, California, United States
- Products: Animated theatrical short films

Harman-Ising Productions was an American animation studio founded by former Winkler Pictures alumni Hugh Harman and Rudolf Ising. It is best known for creating and producing the Looney Tunes and Merrie Melodies series for Warner Bros. Pictures from 1930 to 1933. From 1934 to 1938, Harman-Ising produced the Happy Harmonies series for Metro-Goldwyn-Mayer. The studio launched the career of numerous influential animators, including Bob Clampett, Friz Freleng, William Hanna and Robert McKimson.

== Early history ==
Harman and Ising first worked in animation in 1922 at Laugh-O-Gram Studio, Walt Disney's studio in Kansas City. When Disney moved operations to California, Harman was back at United Film Ad Service and Ising had a photofinishing business. Their plans went nowhere, however, and the men soon came back to Disney on June 22, 1925, to work on his Alice Comedies and Oswald the Lucky Rabbit films for Winkler Pictures. Ising was fired from Winkler in March 1927, when Disney signed the contract to distribute Oswald films to Universal Pictures. It was during this time that Harman and Ising developed a style of cartoon drawing that would later be closely associated with, and credited to, Disney.

When Winkler producer Charles Mintz ended his association with Disney, the majority of Disney's animators, including Harman and Ising, went to work for Mintz, whose brother-in-law, George Winkler, set up a new animation studio to make the Oswald cartoons. The Oswald cartoons which Harman and Ising produced in 1928 and 1929 already show their distinctive style, which would later characterize their work on the Looney Tunes and Merrie Melodies cartoon series for Warner Bros. Late in 1929, Harman and Ising attempted to take over the production of the Oswald series through a proposal to Carl Laemmle, only for Laemmle to terminate their contract with Winkler and start its own animation studio headed by Winkler alumni Walter Lantz and Bill Nolan. Harman and Ising left Winkler along with artists such as Rollin Hamilton and Friz Freleng.

== Warner Bros. and Van Beuren ==
Harman and Ising's proof-of-concept film featuring Bosko, marketed as "Bosko, the Talk-Ink Kid"

Harman and Ising had long aspired to start their own studio, and had created and copyrighted the cartoon character Bosko in 1928. After losing their jobs at the Winkler studio, Harman and Ising founded Harman-Ising Productions, with most of the Disney and Winkler animators as staff. The studio produced a short Bosko demonstration film marketed as "Bosko, the Talk-Ink Kid". The cartoon featured Bosko at odds with his animator – portrayed in live-action by Ising. Impressed, Leon Schlesinger, a producer at Warner Bros., hired Harman and Ising. Schlesinger wanted the Bosko character to star in a new series of cartoons he dubbed Looney Tunes (the title being a parody of Walt Disney's Silly Symphonies). In 1930, the pair's first theatrical Bosko short, Sinkin' in the Bathtub, was a success. In 1931, Harman took over direction of the Looney Tunes starring the character, while Ising launched a sister series called Merrie Melodies that consisted of one-shot stories and characters and primarily existed to promote records of popular music.

The two animators broke off ties with Schlesinger later in 1933 over budget disputes with the producer, who had vetoed their demands for bigger budgets, and went to The Van Beuren Corporation, which was making cartoons for RKO Radio Pictures. There, they were offered a contract to produce three films in the Aesop's Fables series featuring Cubby Bear. Harman and Ising produced two released cartoons for this series, but were in the midst of making a third cartoon when a contractual dispute arose. The pair left Van Beuren, but Harman kept the completed cartoon, and releasing it in the 1940s.

== Metro-Goldwyn-Mayer ==
In 1934, Harman and Ising signed a deal with Metro-Goldwyn-Mayer to start a new series of shorts, Happy Harmonies. Harman and Ising, having maintained the rights to Bosko, occasionally featured the character in the new series. The two maintained the same division of work they had used at Warner Bros.: Harman worked on Bosko shorts, and Ising directed one-shots. In 1935, Harman redesigned Bosko into an identifiable African-American boy, ultimately leading to the character being discontinued. They also tried unsuccessfully to create new cartoon stars for their new distributors. Their cartoons, though technically superior to those they had made for Schlesinger at Warner's, were still music-driven shorts with little to no plot. When the new Happy Harmonies series ran significantly over-budget in 1937, MGM fired Harman and Ising and established its own in-house animation department, which was founded and headed by Fred Quimby.

Harman and Ising then found work as animation freelancers. They lent their former ink-and-painters to Walt Disney while Snow White and the Seven Dwarfs was behind schedule. Disney afterward commissioned Harman and Ising to produce a Silly Symphony cartoon (Merbabies), in return. Disney later reneged on a deal he had made for two other Harman-Ising cartoons (Goldilocks and the Three Bears and The Little Goldfish) to be produced for the studio, as RKO Radio Pictures, Disney's distributor, did not want to release another studio's cartoons. Harman and Ising sold the cartoons to MGM, and Quimby later agreed to hire the duo and their animators back for the in-house studio, as the Harman-Ising studio had declared bankruptcy in July 1938. Ising created the character Barney Bear for MGM at this time. Basing the sleepy-eyed character partially on himself, Barney became the MGM's first hit character.

In 1939, Harman created Peace on Earth, a downbeat morality tale about two squirrels discovering the evils of humanity, which was nominated for an Oscar. The following year, Ising produced William Hanna and Joseph Barbera's first cartoon, Puss Gets the Boot, a cartoon featuring characters later known as Tom and Jerry; according to Barbera, Ising never came into the room, but still got credited. Despite the popularity of Puss Gets the Boot, Ising's The Milky Way was more successful and became the first non-Disney film to win the Academy Award. Despite the success of these and other cartoons, MGM's production under Harman and Ising remained at a low level.

== Legacy ==
In April 1941, Harman left MGM and formed Hugh Harman Productions with Disney veteran Melvin Shaw, while Ising remained at MGM. Ising quit MGM the following year to join the United States Army Air Forces' First Motion Picture Unit. Harman's studio mainly produced shorts for the war department despite planning numerous ambitious animation projects, including the Commandments for Health series featuring Private McGillicuddy (similar to Warner's Private Snafu), and a spinoff Private Snafu short entitled Seaman Tarfu in the Navy. Outside of war-related animation, Harman Productions also produced educational and industrial films, such as Winky the Watchman for the Tennessee Department of Public Health, and Easy Does It for Stokley-Van Camp.

In 1946, Harman and Ising reunited and offered a deal to United Artists, which had previously distributed Disney cartoons, but the deal fell through, apparently in favor of UA releasing John Sutherland and Walter Lantz-produced cartoons. Around the same time, MGM sued Harman and Ising for selling prints of Happy Harmonies cartoons to third-party companies for home distribution, incorrectly believing that they owned the rights to those films. Harman also produced two demo reels in 1947 that blended animation with live-action footage. Around this time, most of the remaining animators working for the duo would migrate to John Sutherland Productions.

After Hugh produced The Littlest Angel with Coronet Films, the Harman-Ising brand resurfaced when the duo started making industrial and commercial films, such as the 1951 film Good Wrinkles for Sunsweet prunes. Harman also freelanced to write the 1954 Woody Woodpecker cartoon Convict Concerto for his former colleague Walter Lantz.

In 1960, Harman-Ising produced a pilot episode for a made for TV cartoon series titled The Adventures of Sir Gee Whiz on the Other Side of the Moon. The unsold pilot for the unproduced series was profiled on episode 6 of Cartoon Dump. Ising was the voice of Sir Gee Whiz. After Gee-Whiz, both Harman and Ising retired from their careers in animation. Harman disowned all but three of his cartoons.
