= Hugh Harman =

American animator (1903–1982)

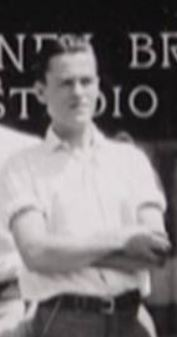
- Harman, c. 1923
- Born: August 31, 1903; Pagosa Springs, Colorado, U.S.
- Died: November 25, 1982 (aged 79); Chatsworth, California, U.S.
- Occupation: Animator
- Years active: 1922–1963
- Employer(s): Laugh-O-Gram Studio (1922); Winkler Pictures (1923–1929); Harman-Ising Productions (1929–1950s); MGM (1938–1941); Hugh Harman Productions (1941–1960s); Walter Lantz Productions (1954)
- Known for: Looney Tunes; Merrie Melodies; Happy Harmonies
- Children: 1
- Family: Fred Harman (brother)

Signature
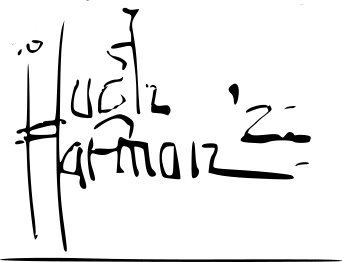

Hugh Harman (August 31, 1903 – November 25, 1982) was an American animator, film producer, and film director. An early collaborator of Walt Disney and a key figure in the Golden Age of American animation, Harman and his longtime collaborator Rudolf Ising founded Harman-Ising Productions in 1929, through which they created the Looney Tunes and Merrie Melodies cartoon series and set the foundation for what would later become the Warner Bros. Cartoons studio.

Moving the distribution of their cartoons to Metro-Goldwyn-Mayer in 1934, Harman and Ising started the Happy Harmonies series, which led to the creation of the MGM cartoon department, where Harman and Ising would both work as producer/directors.

== Career ==
A native of Pagosa Springs, Colorado, Hugh Harman began his animation career in Kansas City, Missouri in 1922, when he and his older brother Fred Harman began working for Walt Disney on Disney's early Laugh-O-Gram Cartoons. When that company went bankrupt, Harman and partner Rudolf Ising tried to start a new series based on the Arabian Nights, but were unable to obtain funding. Disney called them back when he began work for Winkler Pictures, producing the Alice Comedies live-action/animation hybrid shorts and the Oswald the Lucky Rabbit cartoons.

After Disney left Winkler over a budget dispute with producer Charles Mintz, Mintz lured most of his animators, Harman and Ising included, to join him at his in-house studio. An attempt to convince Carl Laemmle to oust Mintz in favor of Harman and Ising ended in vain with a young Walter Lantz being granted the right to produce the series in early 1929. Harman and Ising, alongside a number of former Oswald animators put together a pilot short marketed as "Bosko, the Talk-Ink Kid", featuring a character Harman created in 1928 as sound films were becoming popular. The short gained them a contract with Warner Bros. Pictures to produce animated cartoons with Leon Schlesinger as manager. Harman and Ising started the Looney Tunes and Merrie Melodies cartoons in 1930 and 1931, respectively (Harman would direct the Looney Tune shorts), and produced them until 1933. Following a number of clashes with Schlesinger over budgets, they decided to leave WB and look for another distributor. Harman and Ising took Bosko with them, having previously copyrighted him to avoid facing the same situation Disney had with Oswald. In the meantime, Harman-Ising Pictures outsourced a number of Cubby Bear cartoons for The Van Beuren Corporation.

=== MGM Cartoons and later career ===
In early 1934, Harman and Ising were hired by Metro-Goldwyn-Mayer, which launched the Happy Harmonies series in color (incidentally replacing fellow 1920s-era Disney veteran Ub Iwerks), in which Harman redeveloped Bosko into a realistic black child. After more budget disputes, Harman and Ising were fired by MGM in 1937, being replaced by an in-house cartoon department headed by Fred Quimby. That same year, Disney reconciled with Harman and Ising, borrowing their painters for Snow White and the Seven Dwarfs in exchange for the studio producing the animation for the Silly Symphony short Merbabies. Two shorts planned at Harman-Ising (Pipe Dreams and The Little Bantamweight) were rejected by Roy O. Disney and sold to MGM, who hired the duo after their studio suffered from poor quality output.

After leaving Metro in 1941, Harman founded a new studio with Disney veteran Mel Shaw. In 1943, the duo signed a deal with Orson Welles to adapt The Little Prince, in which Welles would play the role of the aviator while a random child actor would portray the prince. A few months later, Welles fell ill with hepatitis, nearly dying while recovering in Florida. After this, the deal fell through and the film was scrapped.

From 1945 to 1947, Harman's production company would produce various cartoons for the army and for educational films. Harman was sued by MGM in 1946 after selling prints of Happy Harmonies cartoons to external companies for home and non-theatrical distribution, having retained the films' negatives and believing he owned the rights to the films. After a two year hiatus, Harman returned to the animation industry with The Littlest Angel, a collaboration between his company and Coronet Films. He also wrote the Woody Woodpecker short Convict Concerto. Harman's final film (albeit incomplete and entirely shipped to Coronet, completed by Gordon A. Sheehan) was Tom Thumb in King Arthur's Court. Harman worked on the film extensively with Mel Shaw, but ultimately handed production to Coronet. The film had been in production since the 1940s, under the working title "King Arthur's Knights".

== Later life ==
After Harman-Ising Studios closed in 1960, Harman fell in a state of abject poverty. He lived in a ramshackle house, no longer being able to afford a car, although he often disguised his precarious state by frequently having breakfast at a Beverly Hills restaurant. He had to constantly borrow money from Ising, as well as colleagues Friz Freleng and Roy O. Disney in the 1970s to keep afloat. He also received a monthly allowance from his brother Fred, until Fred's death in January 1982. After that point, Harman was moved into a house on Chatsworth, the rent being paid by his friends, among them animator Mark Kausler and historian Jim Korkis, who had both met Harman through Bob Clampett in 1973.

On November 25, 1982, Harman died after a long illness in his home. He was survived by his son Michael. Harman was married twice, both times ending in divorce. His second wife was a Greek woman named Kahtia who married him in 1980 but left him soon after gaining her citizenship.

== See also ==
- Harman-Ising Productions
