= Moonlight for Two =

1932 film by Rudolf Ising

- Title card
- Directed by: Rudolf Ising
- Produced by: Hugh Harman; Rudolf Ising; Leon Schlesinger
- Music by: Frank Marsales
- Animation by: Isadore Freleng; Larry Martin
- Color process: Black-and-white
- Production companies: Harman-Ising Productions; Leon Schlesinger Productions
- Distributed by: Warner Bros. Pictures; The Vitaphone Corporation
- Release date: June 11, 1932
- Running time: 7 min.
- Country: United States
- Language: English

Moonlight for Two is a 1932 American animated comedy short film directed by Rudolf Ising. It is the twelfth film in the Merrie Melodies series, featuring the titular song by Joe Burke. The short was released on June 11, 1932, and stars Goopy Geer, one of the few recurring characters in the early Merrie Melodies series.

== Plot ==
The full short

One night, Goopy Geer's girlfriend comes out of her cabin singing "She'll Be Coming 'Round the Mountain", while Goopy waits for her outside. They sing the titular song together alongside a bird and its three children. They hop onto a wooden cart which rolls down the hill, destroying a log cabin whose logs then stack neatly upon landing. The cart crashes into a tree but reassembles into a perfect wheelbarrow, which the girl lands on and Goopy drives. They cross a shoddy bridge, which collapses into the water under their weight without breaking.

In a large cabin, a square dance is taking place: amongst other partners, two donkeys dance with their tails joining, which one kitten exploits as a makeshift skipping rope; a goat-like fiddler continually resins his bow between his toes. Goopy and his girlfriend then arrive, the steps somehow shrinking him to his chagrin. The couple dance as the band play the title piece. The cabin's stove also dances while refreshing itself by refilling coals. A dachshund couple also dance; the male drinks moonshine, which shrinks its body like a cigar. Goopy then dances with the stove, which he helps release its ashes.

A bear enters with a shotgun; he attempts to assault Goopy's girlfriend, which Goopy reacts angrily to. As he escapes the bear's bullet, he steps on two spittoons which he flings at the bear. The two then brawl while the stove attempts to mediate the conflict and burns the bear's buttocks twice. The stove then breathes fire at the bear, with Goopy using it like a minigun to spit coals, causing the bear to escape as he burns in agony.
