= One More Time (1931 film) =

1931 film

- Title card
- Directed by: Rudolf Ising
- Produced by: Hugh Harman; Rudolf Ising; Leon Schlesinger
- Starring: Rudolf Ising; Rochelle Hudson
- Music by: Abe Lyman; Frank Marsales
- Animation by: Isadore Freleng; Paul Smith
- Color process: Black-and-white
- Production companies: Harman-Ising Productions; Leon Schlesinger Productions
- Distributed by: Warner Bros. Pictures; The Vitaphone Corporation
- Release date: August 8, 1931; (earliest known date)
- Running time: 7:01
- Country: United States
- Language: English

One More Time is a 1931 American animated comedy short film. It is the second film in the Merrie Melodies series starring Foxy. It was released as early as August 8, 1931. (Note: Archived from an August 11 article, this is based on the fact that new cartoon shorts would premiere in theaters on Saturdays. It could've actually premiered on August 1.) It was directed by Rudolf Ising.

This is one of only three Merrie Melodies cartoons to star Foxy; the other two are Lady, Play Your Mandolin! and Smile, Darn Ya, Smile!. Its copyright was never renewed after Associated Artists Productions acquired its rights, allowing it to lapse into the public domain.

== Plot ==
Full short

Foxy, a Prohibition-era police officer, patrols the streets while avoiding traffic. He angrily beckons the drivers after cars narrowly miss him twice. He enters an alley after a third attempt, where a thug hiding in a trash can shoots him with a machine gun. Foxy fires his replica gun, which summons a mouse resembling Mickey Mouse with a giant hammer that incapacitates the thug.

A rich hippo drives a car with numerous mice serving as horns. An annoyed mouse driving behind demands her to move aside, then drives on her car as retribution for her refusal. The hippo raises her car to tower over the mouse and drives over him, only to run over Foxy. Foxy angrily pursues her after spitting out chewing tobacco. She demands to be given an extra chance for forgiveness, which Foxy at first relents but refuses due to her vulgar behavior, reducing her to tears as he issues a traffic ticket and slams a trash can onto her head.

Foxy is hit by a falling object and spots Roxy and her dog. Roxy's dog licks him with affection, much to his chagrin; he ties the dog's tongue over its head, which then untangles as he dances to Roxy's piano playing. The trio dance while Foxy uses the dog to play a piano roll. Suddenly, they hear a crow robbing another rich hippo at gunpoint. Foxy and other policemen pursue him, as the crow's vehicle expands to reveal more thugs. While the other policemen were incapacitated in a pothole, the thugs abduct Roxy. Foxy uses his mechanical horse to retrieve Roxy and lure the thieves into jail. Foxy and Roxy celebrate the criminal's incarceration, only for the crow to shoot Foxy's buttocks with a machine gun.

== Colorized version ==
A copy of the short was sent to South Korea in 1973 to be redrawn in color, being renamed On Duty. However, the copy was missing its audio. As a result, the short was filled with stock music and sound effects and contained no dialogue.

== Home media ==
One More Time is available on Disc 3 of the Looney Tunes Golden Collection: Volume 6.
