= Gangbuster =

Gang Busters was an American radio series.

Gangbuster(s) or Gang Busters might also refer to:

- Gang Busters (serial), a movie serial based on the radio series
- Gang Busters, a 1955 crime film
- "Gang Busters" (Tiny Toons episode), a Tiny Toon episode
- Gangbuster (DC Comics), a DC Comics character
- Gangbuster (film), a 1977 crime film
- Gangbusters (role-playing game), a role-playing game
- Gangbusters, a 1952 American television series based on the radio series
- Gangbusters (1982 video game), a 1982 Commodore 64 game
- Gangbusters (1988 video game), a 1988 arcade game
