= Bust =

Bust commonly refers to:

- Breasts
- Bust (sculpture), of head and shoulders
- An arrest
- An economic contraction, the opposite of a boom,

Bust may also refer to:

== Places ==
- Bust, Bas-Rhin, a city in France
- Lashkargah, Afghanistan, known as Bust historically

== Media ==
- Bust (magazine) of feminist pop culture
- Bust (TV series), 1987–1988 UK comedy-drama television series
- "Bust", a 2015 song by rapper Waka Flocka Flame

== Other uses ==
- Bust, in blackjack
- Boom and bust economic cycle
- Draft bust in sports, referring to a highly touted athlete that does not meet expectations

== See also ==
- Busted (disambiguation)
- Crimebuster (disambiguation)
- Gangbuster (disambiguation)
