= Goopy Geer =

1932 film

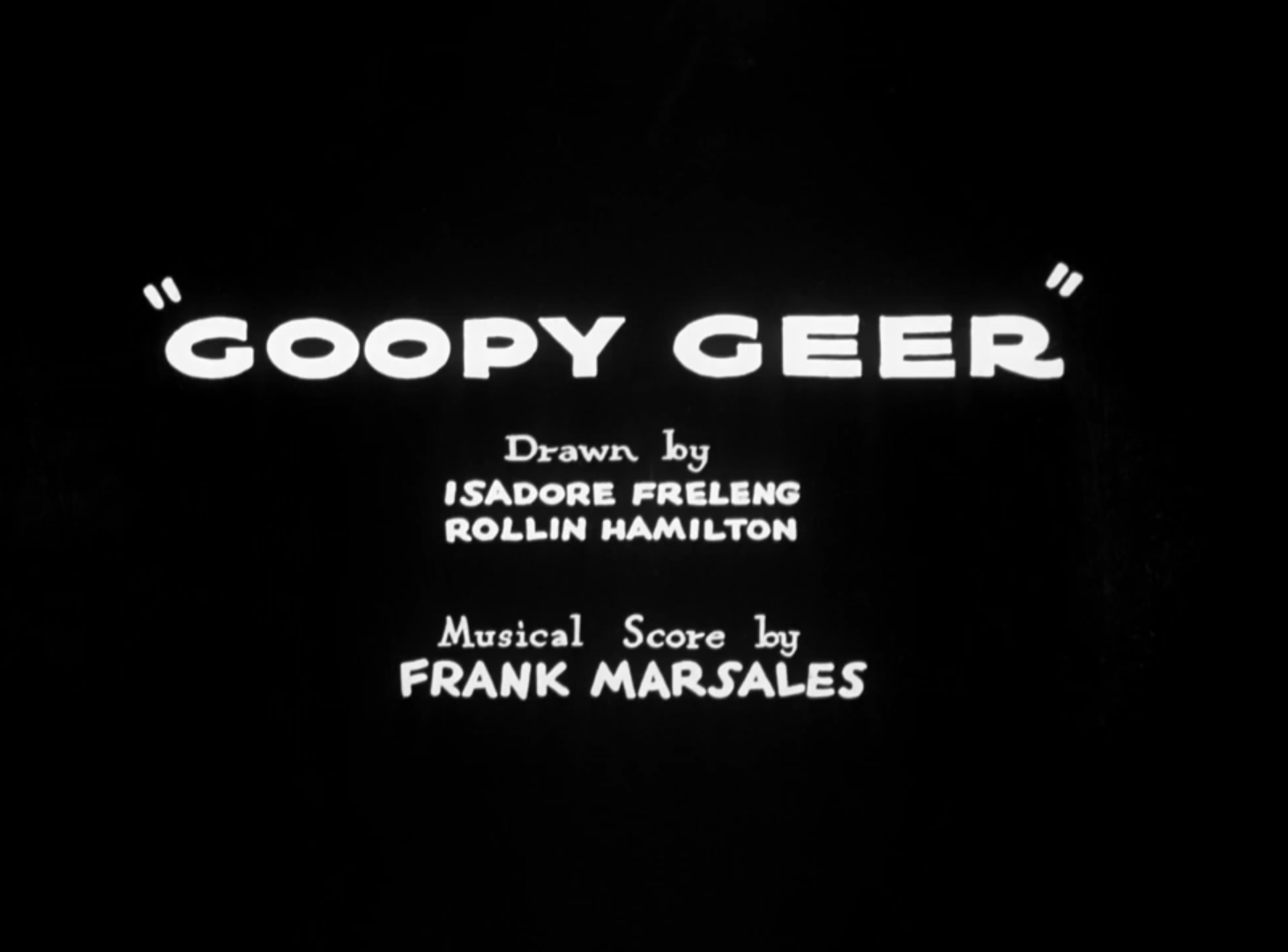
- Title card
- Directed by: Rudolf Ising
- Produced by: Hugh Harman; Rudolf Ising; Leon Schlesinger
- Starring: Johnny Murray; Rudolf Ising; The King's Men
- Music by: Frank Marsales
- Animation by: Isadore Freleng; Rollin Hamilton
- Color process: Black-and-white
- Production companies: Harman-Ising Productions; Leon Schlesinger Productions
- Distributed by: Warner Bros. Pictures; The Vitaphone Corporation
- Release date: April 16, 1932
- Running time: 7 minutes
- Country: United States
- Language: English

Goopy Geer is a 1932 American animated comedy short film directed by Rudolf Ising. It is the tenth film in the Merrie Melodies series, featuring the titular song by Herman Hupfeld, and the first appearance of the title character. The short was released on April 16, 1932, alongside the feature film The Crowd Roars.

== Plot ==
The short from 1932, restored.

The customers in a nightclub clamor for Goopy Geer, who emerges from numerous smaller stages to sing and play the piano for the audience with his hands and ears. He switches to a slower tune after he notices three cats slurping soup and eating crackers loudly. A cow also eats spaghetti to the tune, to his amusement.

Goopy Geer then plays a ragtime song, which his gloves independently help him in playing. In the meantime, the waiter requests a bowl of soup, which a chicken "chef" produces by bathing in boiling water, emerging unscathed as the soup is served. A female dog then goes on stage, jokes with him and dances to his music, while a conflict between a dog and a hippo takes place.

Goopy Geer then dances to a jazz number, which a turkey and two clothing racks dance to. A drunken horse also dances while reaching for more alcohol, only to hallucinate upon seeing his face in a mirror. He goes on stage and spits on Goopy Geer, causing him to explode, but he does not mind as he continues the show on his destroyed piano.

Two scenes—one involving a waiter, the other the drunken horse—are reused from the earlier Foxy short Lady, Play Your Mandolin! One of the customers, a fat lady hippo, appeared in the Foxy short Smile, Darn Ya, Smile!

== Reception ==
Motion Picture Herald called the film "an amusing cartoon number." The review noted that "the furniture does its assorted jigging in a manner often done before, but the short is entertaining enough in animated fashion."
