= Beust =

Beust is a surname. Notable people with the surname include:

- Friedrich Beust (1817–1899), German soldier and political activist and Swiss reform pedagogue
- Friedrich Ferdinand von Beust (1809–1886), German and Austrian statesman
- Hans-Henning Freiherr von Beust (1913–1991), highly decorated Oberst in the Luftwaffe during World War II
- Ole von Beust (born 1955), German politician, First Mayor of Hamburg, President of the Bundesrat for one year

== See also ==
- Beussent
- Beuste
- Beuster
- Breust
- Bust (disambiguation)
