= Foxy (Merrie Melodies) =

Warner Bros. theatrical cartoon character

- Merrie Melodies character
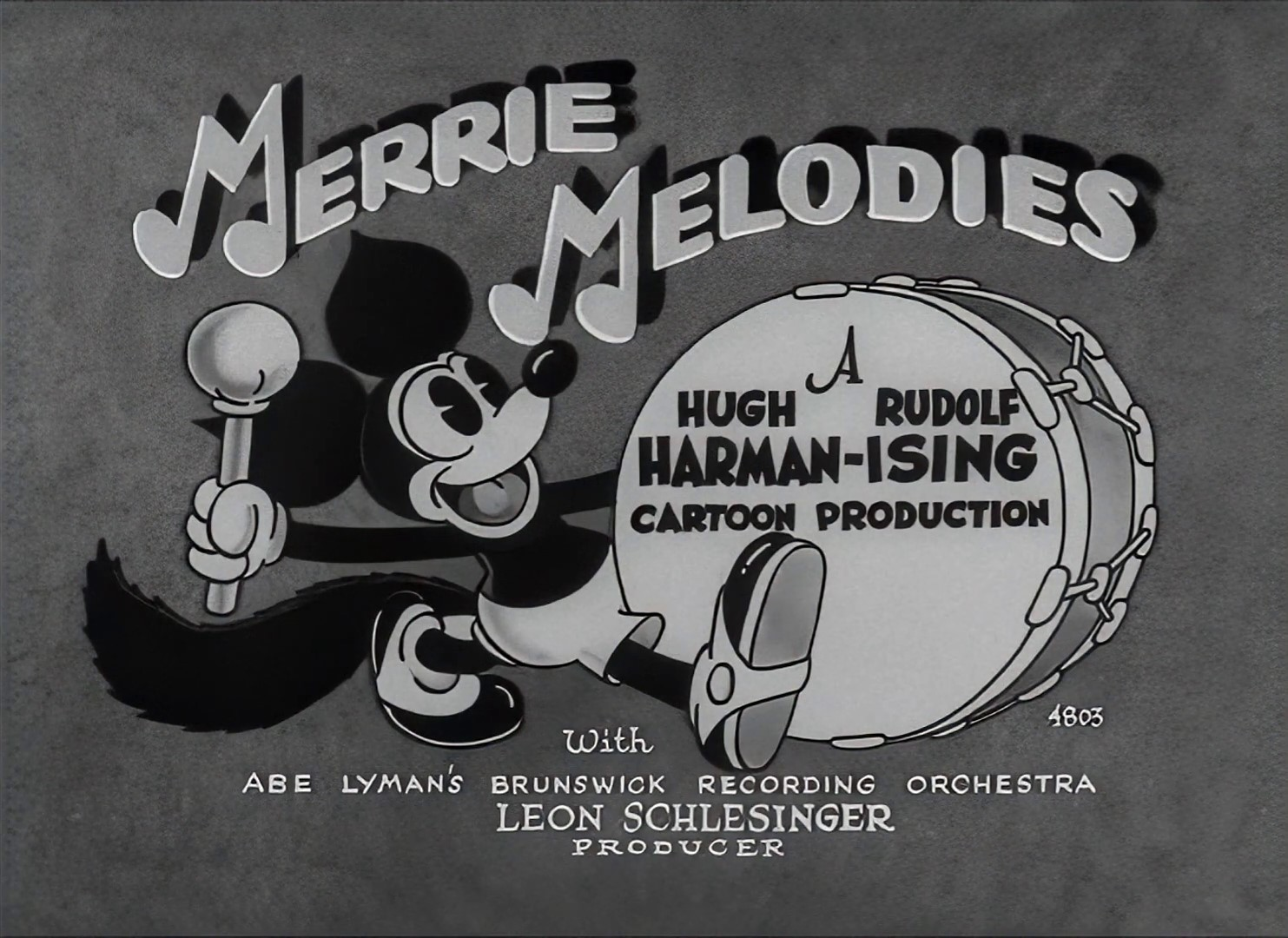
- Foxy on the Merrie Melodies title card in 1931
- First appearance: Lady, Play Your Mandolin! (1931)
- Last appearance: Two-Tone Town (1992)
- Created by: Rudolf Ising
- Voiced by: Johnny Murray (1931); Rob Paulsen (1992)

In-universe information
- Species: Fox
- Gender: Male

Foxy is an animated cartoon character featured in the first three animated shorts in the Merrie Melodies series, all distributed by Warner Bros. Pictures in 1931. He was the creation of animator Rudolf Ising, who had worked for Walt Disney in the 1920s. The character is notable for his resemblance to Mickey Mouse, a similar character created by Disney in 1928.

== Concept and creation ==
In 1925, Hugh Harman drew images of mice on a portrait of Walt Disney, a reminder of Disney's fondness for the rodents living at the Laugh-O-Gram Studio in Kansas City, Missouri. Disney and Ub Iwerks would then use it as inspiration for their creating Mickey Mouse, the character who eventually established Disney as a major figure in Hollywood, also sparking a wave of "clones" at competing studios. Comics historian Don Markstein, calling Warner Bros. animator Rudolf Ising's subsequent Foxy "perhaps the leading Mickey Mouse imitator", observed that:

"Never in animation, before or since, has a character looked more like Mickey Mouse. Smooth out the tiny points that supposedly turned his big, round ears into fox ears, shave the bushiness off of his tail, and they were ringers. Do the same to his girlfriend (unnamed at the time), and she looked exactly like Minnie [Mouse]. They also acted like Mickey and Minnie did at the time. Despite this lack of originality, Foxy was the first character to originate at Warner (as opposed to being brought in from outside, like Bosko)".

== Screen history ==
=== Merrie Melodies ===
Foxy was the star of the first Merrie Melodies cartoons Ising directed for producer Leon Schlesinger (Ising had already helped his partner Hugh Harman create another series, titled Looney Tunes, with the character Bosko). Foxy's first appearance on screen was in August 1931 in Lady, Play Your Mandolin! This short set in the Old West features Foxy developing affection for the tavern singer who would become his girlfriend.

On October 3, 1931, a second short, One More Time, was released. The character was believed by many to be killed off in the final scene, as a crow shoots Foxy in the back after he successfully captures a street gang.

Foxy and his then-nameless girlfriend would appear in another cartoon that same year: Smile, Darn Ya, Smile! (October 10, 1931), a musical set on a trolley. This also marks the first time Foxy's name was mentioned and would become Foxy's final appearance in the Merrie Melodies series. Despite this, he has a cameo appearance in the Looney Tunes film Bosko's Fox Hunt as a generic fox.

Foxy's film career ended abruptly with a phone call by Walt Disney, who asked Ising not to use a character so visually similar to Mickey Mouse. He was then replaced by Piggy, who appeared in the following two Merrie Melodies cartoons.

At the end of each short, Foxy peeks out from behind a bass drum that reads "A MERRIE MELODY", walks and says to the viewer, "So long, folks!", while raising his arm, which would become the sign-off for Merrie Melodies cartoons until mid-1934.

Upon leaving Warner Bros. two years later, Ising took the rights to Foxy and other characters he and Harman conceived (including Piggy and Goopy Geer). Though Harman-Ising eventually found another distributor in Metro-Goldwyn-Mayer, none of their WB-era characters besides Bosko appeared in any more theatrical cartoons. All three Foxy shorts eventually went into the public domain.

=== Later appearances ===
Foxy appeared along with his girlfriend (here christened "Roxy") and fellow forgotten Warner Bros. progenitor Goopy Geer in "Two-Tone Town", an episode of the animated series Tiny Toon Adventures aired on September 28, 1992. The foxes were voiced by Rob Paulsen and Desirée Goyette respectively and were redesigned for the episode. Foxy's appearance in this episode is similar to his theatrical version, except that the tear-drop ears are replaced by pointy ones to make him appear more fox-like and less Mickey-like. Also, his shoes lack spats. The three live in a world of black-and-white which is visited by the series' stars, Babs Bunny and Buster Bunny. Buster and Babs, feeling sorry for the old timers left in oblivion, decided to help bring Foxy, Roxy and Goopy alongside Big Bee (based on the bee from You're Too Careless With Your Kisses!) back to the limelight. The efforts of the two rabbits work out but results in Buster and Babs being featured in guest appearances while the characters they helped become the new TV sensations.

In May 2025, Roxy was added into the mobile game Looney Tunes World of Mayhem, while Foxy was added later that month. Both characters were added during the game's "Western Takeover" event, and thus use their appearances from "Lady, Play Your Mandolin!".
