= Smile, Darn Ya, Smile! =

1931 film

- Title card
- Directed by: Rudolf Ising(uncredited)
- Produced by: Hugh Harman; Rudolf Ising; Leon Schlesinger
- Starring: Rudolf Ising (uncredited)
- Music by: Frank Marsales; Abe Lyman
- Animation by: Isadore Freleng; Max Maxwell
- Color process: Black-and-white
- Production companies: Harman-Ising Productions; Leon Schlesinger Productions
- Distributed by: Warner Bros. Pictures; The Vitaphone Corporation
- Release date: August 15, 1931; (earliest known date)
- Running time: 6:59
- Country: United States
- Language: English

Smile, Darn Ya, Smile! is a 1931 American animated comedy film. It is the third title in the Merrie Melodies series featuring Foxy. It was released as early as August 15, 1931. (Note: Archived from an August 16 article, this is based on the fact that new cartoon shorts would premiere in theaters on Saturdays.) It is directed by Rudolf Ising.

This is one of only three Merrie Melodies cartoons to star Foxy; the other two being Lady, Play Your Mandolin! and One More Time. Its plot resembles that of Trolley Troubles, a short featuring Oswald the Lucky Rabbit which Harman helped animate for Walt Disney.

A gag suggested by animator Bob Clampett for the film has characters from the trolley's parody advertising posters (Smith Brothers and others) humorously come to life and perform business. This joke would become a running gag across Merrie Melodies films, especially those with involvement from Clampett.

== Plot ==
Full short

Foxy drives a trolley while singing the titular song. A rock disrupts the track as the trolley is launched and falls but miraculously fixable when it lands. A female hippo turned out to be too obese to board the trolley, flattening Foxy as a result. Foxy mockingly pops her with a needle, causing her to deflate and undress, humiliating her as she leaves furiously.

The trolley disassembles itself upon the journey's resumption, though Foxy successfully catches up to the wheels. Roxy boards the trolley and sings the titular song with Foxy. Advertisements on the trolley come to life upon hearing the song, humorously interacting with each other alongside the song's lyrics. The trolley comes upon a stubborn grazing cow, who angers Foxy after spitting on the trolley. Meanwhile, some animals and a chicken they were boiling are amused by the situation and sing along to the titular song. Foxy winds back the trolley and passes by under the cow, causing it to leave furiously.

The trolley travels on a tightrope into a tunnel, leaving Foxy behind as he falls out. Horrified, he finds Roxy and the trolley tumbling down a very steep slope. Foxy tries to pull her in with a lasso tied to a tree to no avail, falling back into the trolley. They travel through multiple tunnels and fall off a cliff. Foxy wakes up, revealing the events of the short to be a nightmare while his radio plays the titular song. He destroys the radio in amusement.

== Song ==
In 1931, English bandleader Billy Cotton covered the song.

It was used twice in Robert Zemeckis' 1988 film Who Framed Roger Rabbit: first when Eddie Valiant arrives in Toontown; and then during the film's finale. Both times, it was sung by the toons present in the film. Warner Bros. Entertainment licensed the song alongside their characters to Disney alongside other studios due to its diverse inclusion of animated characters.

In 2013, actor Christoph Waltz sang "Smile, Damn You, Smile" during his hosting duties on Saturday Night Live.

== Colorization ==
In 1973 and 1992, colorized versions were respectively commissioned by Fred Ladd and Ted Turner. Due to the technological limitations of the time, the colorization process was done by tracing the original animation and then coloring it in. The colorization was completed in South Korea.

== Home media ==
The film was released on DVD as part of Looney Tunes Golden Collection: Volume 6.

== See also ==
List of animated films in the public domain in the United States
