= Bosko's Fox Hunt =

1931 film

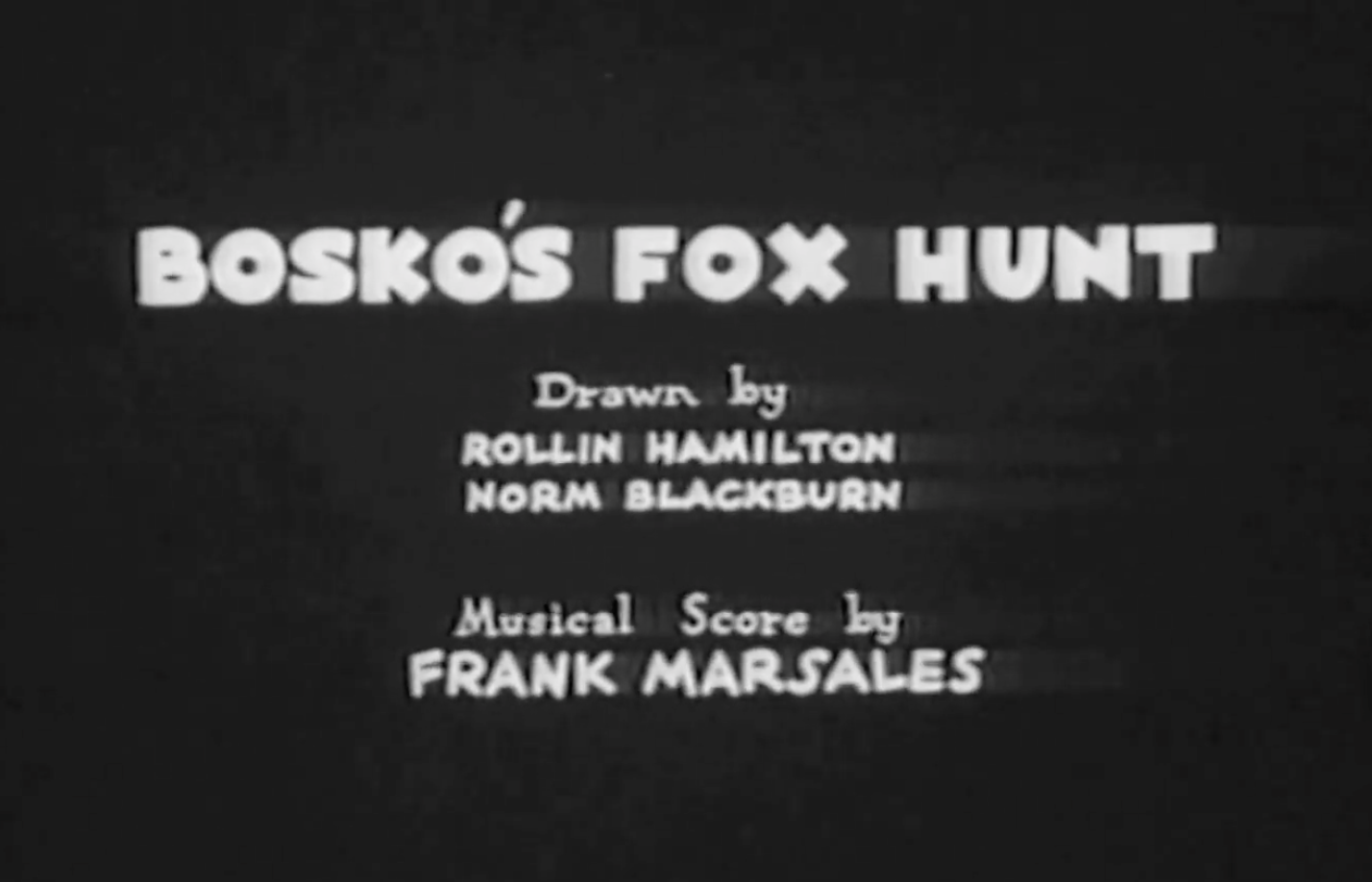
- Title card
- Directed by: Hugh Harman
- Produced by: Hugh Harman; Rudolf Ising; Leon Schlesinger
- Music by: Frank Marsales
- Animation by: Rollin Hamilton; Norm Blackburn
- Production companies: Harman-Ising Productions; Leon Schlesinger Productions
- Distributed by: Warner Bros. Pictures; The Vitaphone Corporation
- Release date: November 28, 1931; (earliest known date)
- Running time: 6:46
- Country: United States
- Language: English

Bosko's Fox Hunt is a 1931 American animated comedy short film. It is the sixteenth film in the Looney Tunes series featuring Bosko. It was released on November 28, 1931. (Note: Archived from a December 3 article, this is based on the fact that new cartoon shorts would premiere in theaters on Saturdays.) It was directed by Hugh Harman, and the film score was composed by Frank Marsales.

The cartoon's plot is somewhat similar to that of the later Looney Tunes cartoons Porky's Duck Hunt (1937) and Porky's Hare Hunt (1938). It is Foxy's only appearance in the Looney Tunes series, making a cameo appearance as a generic fox, and his last appearance overall.

== Plot ==
Full short

Bosko and a gang of animals set out on a fox hunt equipped with guns, horses and hounds. They pursue a naked Foxy, who is unaware of the hunt and gleefully runs through various natural objects. Bosko continuously fails to stay on his horse due to the horse's elasticity, stuffing a log into its mouth to prevent further failings. The log is then used as a bridge across a cliff.

Foxy spots the hunt and hides in a log, where multiple dogs including a dachshund fail to smell his scent and leave. He mocks the hunt only to spot Bosko, which he reacts by literally dragging a tar pit into Bosko's path. The horse leaves angrily after being drenched in tar while Bosko is spared. A hunting dog leads Bosko to Foxy's location. The dog chases Foxy and is tricked into leaving him behind, only to be kicked by a tree to Foxy's location. Foxy tricks him into sniffing a hole, after which he emerges on the other end and bites the dog's buttocks. He uses the same maneuver to redirect Bosko's shotgun and makes him shoot his buttocks.

Bosko and the dog chase Foxy into a tree trunk inhabited by a giant warthog, who then chases them into another tree trunk. The dog is kicked out and tries to enter, only to be hit again. He prepares to hit the warthog with a club through a sneak attack, only to accidentally hit Bosko, who successfully fought and killed the warthog while remaining unscathed. They celebrate their success.
