= Busted =

Busted may refer to:

== Music ==
- Busted (band), an English rock band

=== Albums ===
- Busted (2002 Busted album), the debut album by the band
- Busted (2004 Busted album), a compilation album by the band
- Busted (Cheap Trick album) or the title song, 1990

=== Songs ===
- "Busted" (Harlan Howard song), 1962
- "Busted" (Isley Brothers song), 2003
- "Busted" (Joanne song), 2001
- Busted (Copperhead song), 1992
- "Busted", by the Black Keys from The Big Come Up, 2002
- "Busted", by Candace Flynn and Vanessa Doofenshmirtz from Phineas and Ferb
- "Busted", by Matchbox 20 from Yourself or Someone Like You, 1996
- "Busted", by Vitamin C from More, 2001

== Television ==
- Busted!, a 2018–2021 South Korean streaming show
- MTV's Busted, a reality show that began airing in 2008
- "Busted" (Braceface), a 2003 episode
- "Busted" (Foster's Home for Imaginary Friends), a 2004 episode
- "Busted" (Most Dangerous Game), a 2023 episode
- "Busted" (Roseanne), a 1994 episode
- Busted (TV network), an American TV network

== Other uses ==
- Busted (book), a 2014 book by Wendy Ruderman and Barbara Laker
- Busted (film), a 1997 comedy film
- Busted (horse) (1963–1988), a British Thoroughbred racehorse
- Busted!, the quarterly newsletter of the Comic Book Legal Defense Fund
- "Busted", a game over message that appears in Grand Theft Auto games when a protagonist gets arrested

== See also ==
- Bust (disambiguation)
- Bustard, a family of birds
