= Gangbusters (1982 video game) =

1982 video game

- Title screen
- Developer: Prickly Pear Software
- Publisher: Prickly Pear Software
- Platform: Commodore 64
- Release: 1982
- Genre: Strategy
- Mode: Multiplayer

Gangbusters is a 1982 strategy video game about the American Mafia for the Commodore 64. The game is set during Prohibition in the early 1920s. The game appeared in the December 1982 issue of The Rainbow. Due to various glitches, the game failed to work on 16K machines but worked reliably on most 32K machines. A complete set of documents was included with the game that taught the players the complete glossary of the Mafia "language".

== Gameplay ==
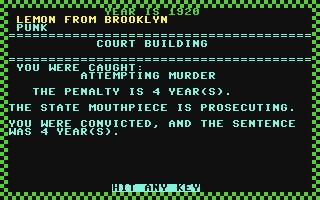
Gangbusters

Each player tries to get promoted from punk to Godfather by purchasing a gun and attempting to murder someone. If convicted, the "state mouthpiece" will sentence the player to four years in prison. For each subsequent sentence, the sentence is doubled unless a pardon can be purchased from the "state mouthpiece". Players can purchase trucking unions, prostitutes that are all assigned with the code name Betsy, and moonshine operations. Limousines can be stolen from other players who already have them, with a certain degree of risk. Betting on horse racing events can play a role in adding valuable dollars to the player's bank account.

All games end either when the last remaining player has become the Godfather or the United States government becomes wise and defeats all the players. The game assigns each player a different American city like Brooklyn or Philadelphia from which to run his domain.

== Reception ==
Andy Peters for The Rainbow said "If you've ever dreamed of living a life of crime, Gangbusters is an excellent way to get started, keeping you both safe and innocent!"

Roy Wagner for Computer Gaming World said "The program offers colorful book-keeping and flawless tabulation. It has very limited graphics, but is an intriguing game with more than one strategy which can win."

== Reviews ==
- Things To Do with your TRS-80 Model 100 Computer
