= William Barden Jr. =

American computer programmer

William Barden Jr. is an author of books and articles on computer programming. Barden's writings mainly covered microcomputers, computer graphics and assembly language and BASIC programming. He was a contributing editor for The Rainbow magazine in which he wrote a monthly column called Barden's Buffer on low-level assembly language programming on the TRS-80 Color Computer. Some of his books were published under the name William T. Barden. He lives in Scottsdale, Arizona.

== Books ==
- Connecting the CoCo to the Real World, 1990, no ISBN (Radio Shack project cancelled, then printed by author). Part of the book comes from his chronicle Barden's Buffer in Rainbow Magazine.
- TRS-80 Models I, III, & Color Computer Interfacing Projects, 1983, ISBN 0-672-22009-1
- TRS-80 Color Computer Assembly Language Programming, Radio Shack catalog number 62-2077, 1983
- TRS-80 Color Computer & MC-10 Programs, Radio Shack cat. no. 26-3195, 1983
- How To Do It on the TRS-80, IJG Inc. publisher, 1983 ISBN 0-936-20008-1
- Color Computer Graphics, Radio Shack cat. no. 62-2076, 1982
- The Z-80 Microcomputer Handbook, Longman Higher Education, 1978, ISBN 0-672-21500-4
- How to program microcomputers, H. W. Sams, 1977, ISBN 0-672-21459-8
- TRS-80 Pocket BASIC Handbook, Radio Shack, 1982
