= You're Too Careless with Your Kisses! =

1932 film by Rudolf Ising

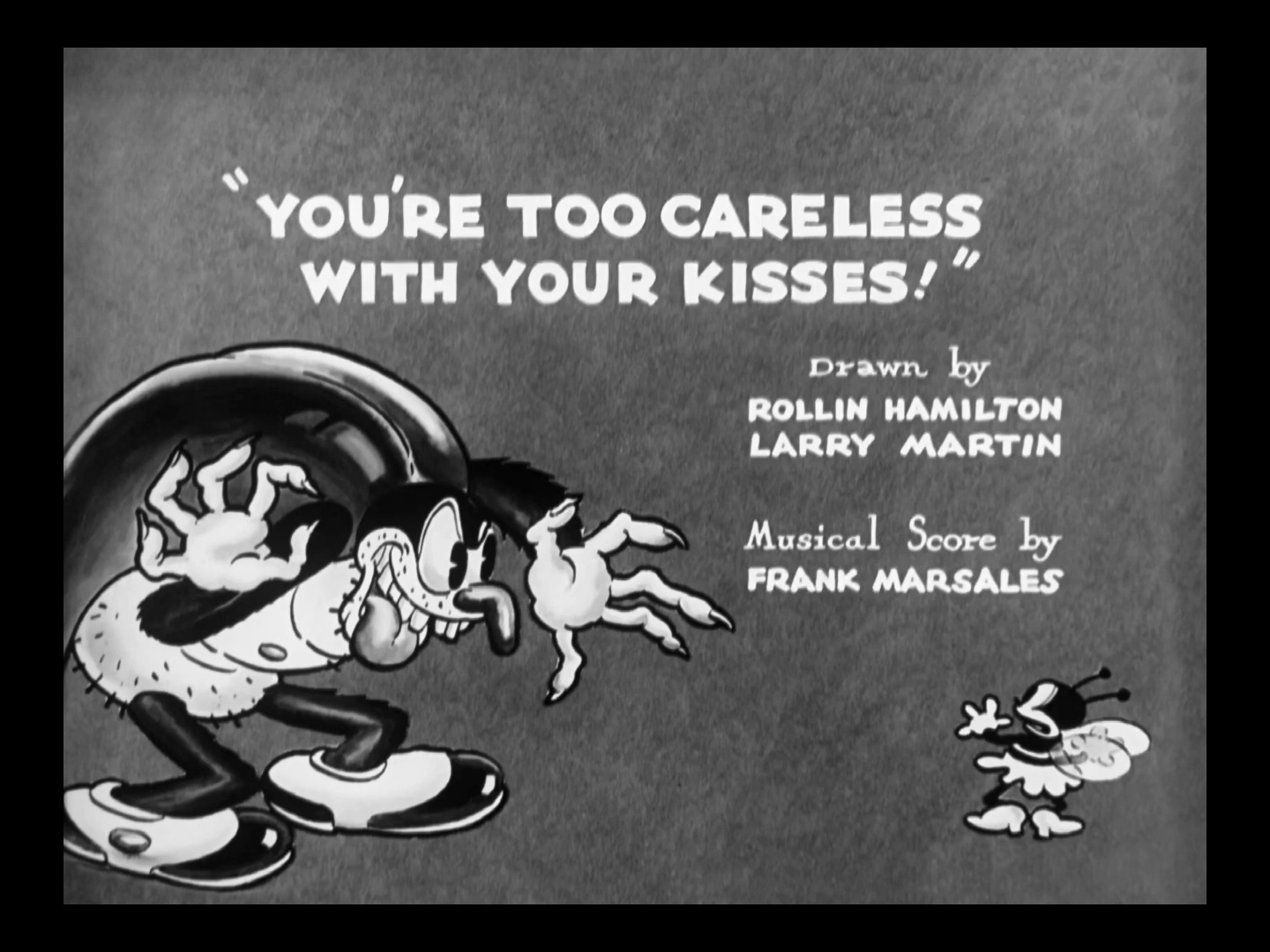
- Title card
- Directed by: Rudolf Ising
- Produced by: Hugh Harman; Rudolf Ising; Leon Schlesinger
- Music by: Frank Marsales
- Animation by: Rollin Hamilton; Larry Martin
- Color process: Black-and-white
- Production companies: Harman-Ising Productions; Leon Schlesinger Productions
- Distributed by: Warner Bros. Pictures; The Vitaphone Corporation
- Release date: September 10, 1932
- Running time: 7 min
- Country: United States
- Language: English

You're Too Careless with Your Kisses is a 1932 American animated comedy short film directed by Rudolf Ising. It is the fifteenth film in the Merrie Melodies series, featuring the titular song by Harry M. Woods. The short was released on September 10, 1932.

== Plot ==
Full short

A honey bee prances across a forest, interacting with numerous plants. He reaches his home, fashioned from a fedora, and tiptoes up the stairs, only to lose his balance and fall onto the sofa, which springs him back onto the stairs. He tiptoes into the room, only to fall flat on the floor, sounding an alarm and causing his wife to wake up. She accuses him of drinking late and takes over as the honey collector, much to his amusement.

Not long after the wife starts her day, a storm starts, causing her to frantically seek shelter. She finds a decrepit house fashioned from a barrel, which houses an old and ugly spider. The spider locks the door and eats the key, trapping the frightened bee inside, guiding her into a dark room, where she struggles to survive and calls for help.

Her husband hears the calls and sounds a horn, summoning a legion of bees, who retrieve tiny horses from a harmonica. They storm the spider's house as the bee runs a thorny vine across the spider's genitalia. The spider escapes on a bucket in a pond, retaliating with a shotgun, while bees fly from a nearby stove, launch bottles of alcohol at him and shoot him with a minigun loaded with peas. As the spider reacts by returning their shots with a pipe, the bees go as far as using a submarine fashioned from a shoe, as well as dropping dynamite on the spider. As the remains of the bucket conveniently trap the incapacitated spider, the bees celebrate their victory.

== Reception ==
The Film Daily called the film "thoroughly enjoyable nonsense".
