= List of Tiny Toon Adventures episodes =

Tiny Toon Adventures is an American animated television series created by Warner Bros. Animation and Amblin Entertainment. It aired for three seasons between 1990 and 1992, accounting for a total of 98 episodes. Most episodes are either divided into three seven-minute segments with wraparounds before each segment, or a single segment of approximately 22 minutes; eight episodes use a "two shorts" format. Besides the 98 episodes, two specials aired: "Tiny Toons Spring Break" and "Tiny Toons' Night Ghoulery". A direct-to-video release, the 79-minute Tiny Toon Adventures: How I Spent My Vacation, was released on March 17, 1992.

== Series overview ==
Season	Episodes		Originally released		
Season	Episodes		First released	Last released	Network
1	65	1	September 14, 1990		CBS
1	65	64	September 17, 1990	March 29, 1991	First-run syndication
2	13		September 16, 1991	February 24, 1992	First-run syndication
How I Spent My Vacation			March 11, 1992		Direct-to-video
3	20		September 14, 1992	December 6, 1992	Fox (Fox Kids)
Specials	2		March 27, 1994	May 28, 1995	Fox (Fox Kids)

== Episodes ==
=== Season 1 (1990–91) ===
No. overall	No. in season	Title (Note: Titles are sourced from the United States Copyright Catalog.)	Directed by	Written by	Storyboard by	Original release date	Prod. code
1	1	"The Looney Beginning"	Glen Kennedy, Dave Marshall, Ken Boyer & Rich Arons	Paul Dini & Sherri Stoner	Barry Caldwell & Byron Vaughns	September 14, 1990	406-148
A fictionalized origin story for the series. Taking inspiration from Bugs Bunny, an animator attempts to create rabbit characters, Buster and Babs Bunny, but discards the sketches. Bugs, Buster and Babs then create the show's setting of Acme Acres and find characters to inhabit it.
2	2	"A Quack in the Quarks"	Art Vitello	Tom Minton	Douglas McCarthy & Bruce Timm	September 17, 1990	406-140
A loose Star Wars parody. Plucky Duck has to save a planet called Planet X from "Duck Vader".
3	3	"The Wheel o' Comedy"	Art Vitello	Paul Dini	Bruce Timm	September 18, 1990	406-113
3	3	"The Wheel o' Comedy"	Art Vitello	Tom Minton	Douglas McCarthy	September 18, 1990	406-113
3	3	"The Wheel o' Comedy"	Art Vitello	Gordon Bressack & Charles Howell	Steve Gordon	September 18, 1990	406-113
Wraparounds: Buster and Babs spin a special wheel to determine the characters that star in each segment. "Devil Doggie": Elmyra Duff mistakes Dizzy Devil for a dog and takes him home with her. "Optical Intrusion": Furrball accidentally glues a pair of magnetic 3-D glasses to his face and attempts to remove them. "Win, Lose or Kerplowie": Babs, Plucky and Montana Max compete on a game show. After Buster discovers that Max is cheating, he and Babs kidnap the host and take his place to get revenge on Max.
4	4	"Test Stress"	Rich Arons	Jim Reardon	Byron Vaughns	September 19, 1990	406-122
4	4	"Test Stress"	Rich Arons	Stephen Langford & Paul Dini	Rich Arons	September 19, 1990	406-122
4	4	"Test Stress"	Rich Arons	Paul Dini & Sherri Stoner	Chris Reccardi	September 19, 1990	406-122
Wraparounds: Buster introduces the start of each segment. "Never Too Late to Loon": Plucky asks Shirley the Loon to turn him into Albert Einstein to help pass a math test, only to fail the test because Einstein had poor grades as a youth. "Li'l Sneezer": Sylvester the Cat tests Furrball by asking him to catch a mouse. The mouse, Lil' Sneezer, sneezes repeatedly and thwarts Furrball's attempts to catch him. "To Bleep or Not to Bleep": Fowlmouth tries to ask Shirley on a date, but she shuns him because of his profane language. Buster then tries to control Fowlmouth after discovering that he does not swear around children.
5	5	"The Buster Bunny Bunch"	Art Leonardi	Gordon Bressack & Charles Howell	Chris Otsuki	September 20, 1990	406-119
5	5	"The Buster Bunny Bunch"	Art Leonardi	Len Janson	Alfred Gimeno & John Dorman	September 20, 1990	406-119
5	5	"The Buster Bunny Bunch"	Art Leonardi	Sherri Stoner	Barry Caldwell	September 20, 1990	406-119
Wraparounds: In a spoof of The Mickey Mouse Club, various characters sing about Buster. "Buffed Bunny": Presuming that Babs is showing excitement over a billboard for a gym, Buster tries to win her over by conditioning his body. At the end, he discovers that she was actually looking at a billboard for carrot cake. "Squish": After Dizzy steps on a bug, Shirley predicts bad things for him, which results Dizzy dreaming that he has become the size of a bug. "Born to Be Riled": Babs' classmates become offended by her impersonations of them, and retaliate by impersonating her.
6	6	"Her Wacky Highness"	Ken Boyer	Sherri Stoner	Barry Caldwell & Byron Vaughns	September 21, 1990	406-108
After being punished for misbehavior at school for her lack of self-control, Babs runs off to Wackyland. She becomes queen of the land, but soon finds herself annoyed by the inhabitants' lack of self-control, and has to be rescued by Buster, Plucky and Hamton.
7	7	"Hollywood Plucky"	Art Vitello	Sherri Stoner	Douglas McCarthy & Bruce Timm	September 24, 1990	406-125
Wanting to get his movie script produced, Plucky travels to Hollywood with Hamton, and both are lured into jobs at a swanky celebrity restaurant but are quickly fired. Upon finally making contact with director Cooper Daville after fighting with Ralph the security guard (in the character’s debut appearance before Animaniacs debut three years later), Plucky discovers that Cooper already made a similar movie to Plucky's, only starring Buster and Babs.
8	8	"Journey to the Center of Acme Acres"	Art Leonardi	Wayne Kaatz	John Ahern, Alberto DeMello & Art Leonardi	September 25, 1990	406-138
A massive earthquake leaves ruins to Acme Acres and sends the characters to the center of the Earth, where they find that gremlins are causing the earthquakes because their large gold nugget has been stolen by Montana Max. The characters then take the gold nugget from Max and return it to the gremlins.
9	9	"It's Buster Bunny Time"	Art Leonardi	Dale Hale	Chris Otsuki	September 26, 1990	406-131
9	9	"It's Buster Bunny Time"	Art Leonardi	Rowby Goren	Alberto DeMello	September 26, 1990	406-131
9	9	"It's Buster Bunny Time"	Art Leonardi	Jim Reardon, Paul Dini, Don Dougherty & Tom Ruegger	Barry Caldwell	September 26, 1990	406-131
Wraparounds: A parody of Howdy Doody with Buster as Buffalo Bob and Plucky as Howdy Doody. "Bag That Bunny": Elmyra pays Calamity Coyote to help her catch Buster. Despite several attempts, he fails to catch Buster, and is then taken home by Elmyra instead. "Lifestyles of the Rich and Rotten": In this parody of Lifestyles of the Rich and Famous, Buster and Babs attempt to interview Montana Max. "The Anvil Chorus": Anvils repeatedly fall on Plucky during the playing of Giuseppe Verdi's Anvil Chorus. The finale features cannons shooting at Plucky to the tune of Pyotr Ilyich Tchaikovsky's 1812 Overture.
10	10	"Stuff That Goes Bump in the Night"	Art Leonardi	Pamela Hickey & Dennys McCoy	Tony Benedict	September 27, 1990	406-127
10	10	"Stuff That Goes Bump in the Night"	Art Leonardi	Richard Mueller	Alberto DeMello	September 27, 1990	406-127
10	10	"Stuff That Goes Bump in the Night"	Art Leonardi	Pat Allee, Ben Hurst & Tom Ruegger	Chris Otsuki	September 27, 1990	406-127
Wraparounds: Buster and Babs scare each other. "Home Wrecker": After finding steel bars driven down into his burrow, Buster finds that Montana Max is building a house right over him. He then disguises himself as a ghost to scare Max away. "Fang You Very Much": Elmyra joins a pet-of-the-month club and receives a bat who turns into a vampire. "Easy Biter": Hamton is annoyed by a mosquito who keeps trying to bite him. He finally releases him, only to have the mosquito's entire family invade his house.
11	11	"Looking Out for the Little Guy"	Art Vitello	Nick Hollander	Bruce Timm	September 28, 1990	406-133
11	11	"Looking Out for the Little Guy"	Art Vitello	Jim Reardon	Douglas McCarthy	September 28, 1990	406-133
11	11	"Looking Out for the Little Guy"	Art Vitello	Pat Allee, Ben Hurst & Tom Ruegger	Will Finn	September 28, 1990	406-133
Wraparounds: Buster describes each episode as an example of the characters looking out for those smaller than they are. "Awful Orphan": Elmyra discovers Lil' Sneezer in a basket on her doorstep and cares for him as if he were a baby. "The Re-Return of the Toxic Revenger": When the water from Plucky's swamp is stolen by Montana Max to fill his pool, Plucky dresses as a superhero (the Toxic Revenger) and tries to return the water. "Dog-Bird Afternoon": Byron Basset tries to keep Furrball from getting to a nest with baby birds in it. After Furrball is thwarted, the birds rescue Byron from the top of the house.
12	12	"Starting from Scratch"	Ken Boyer	Wayne Kaatz & Tom Ruegger	Barry Caldwell, Byron Vaughns & John Dorman	October 1, 1990	406-132
This episode is a parody of Don Bluth's An American Tail, only this time, it is done with fleas instead of mice. A family of fleas becomes separated when their younger child lands on Furrball. Buster, Babs and Plucky shrink themselves to flea size to help the young flea reunite with his family, who then take residence on Furrball.
13	13	"Hare Raising Night"	Art Vitello	Gordon Bressack & Charles Howell	Douglas McCarthy, Bruce Timm & Will Finn	October 2, 1990	406-117
Buster, Babs, Plucky and Hamton attempt to stop a mad scientist named Dr. Gene Splicer, who performs mutation experiments on animals.
14	14	"Furrball Follies"	Art Vitello	Tom Minton	Bruce Timm	October 3, 1990	406-105
14	14	"Furrball Follies"	Art Vitello	Sherri Stoner	Douglas McCarthy	October 3, 1990	406-105
14	14	"Furrball Follies"	Art Vitello	Eddie Fitzgerald	Will Finn	October 3, 1990	406-105
Each of these shorts is linked to the other chronologically. In all three, Furrball attempts to find a home, while being chased by two bully cats named Amby and Floyd (who make their first appearances in this episode). "K-9 Kitty": Furrball is taken into the house of a couple with poor vision after they mistake him for a seeing-eye dog. After the couple receive new eyeglasses, they find out that a cat is in their house, and get rid of him because they dislike cats. "Aroma Amore": After having a stripe accidentally painted on his back, Furrball hides in a junkyard, where he is pursued by Fifi La Fume, who mistakes him for a skunk. Furrball finally removes the stripe, then paints Amby and Floyd to look like skunks. "Cross-Country Kitty": Furrball is taken into Mary Melody's house, where he begins pursuing Sweetie Bird. Mary takes him on vacation to distract him from Sweetie, but he still travels across the country several times in attempts to capture Sweetie. At the end, Furrball is scared off by dogs that Sweetie has brought into the house, and runs back to the cardboard box that he had been living in.
15	15	"The Acme Acres Zone"	Ken Boyer	Michael Reaves	Byron Vaughns	October 4, 1990	406-128
15	15	"The Acme Acres Zone"	Ken Boyer	Wayne Kaatz	Barry Caldwell	October 4, 1990	406-128
15	15	"The Acme Acres Zone"	Ken Boyer	Sherri Stoner & Tom Minton	John Dorman	October 4, 1990	406-128
Wraparounds: A spoof of The Twilight Zone with Buster as Rod Serling. "A Walk on the Flip Side": Montana Max dreams that he has become a rabbit. He finds Buster and Babs living in his house, who call an animal shelter and have him taken away. After waking from the dream, Max promises to be nice to rabbits, which he disregards as he throws Buster and Babs out into the cold. However, Max then finds several rabbits in his cabinets. "A Bacon Strip": Plucky and Hamton sneak onto Montana Max's property and Hamton goes skinny-dipping in the pool. After having his clothes stolen, Hamton has to return naked to his house, where his friends have planned a surprise birthday party. "Senserely Yours, Babs": Babs loses her sense of humor (personified as a ghost of herself), and Hamton and Calamity attempt to capture it.
16	16	"Life in the 90's"	Rich Arons	Paul Dini & Bob Carrau	Byron Vaughns	October 5, 1990	406-126
16	16	"Life in the 90's"	Rich Arons	Jim Reardon	Jim Fletcher	October 5, 1990	406-126
16	16	"Life in the 90's"	Rich Arons	Sherri Stoner & Tom Ruegger	Chris Reccardi & Glen Hill	October 5, 1990	406-126
Wraparounds: Buster introduces each segment, describing them as examples of life in the 1990s. "Whining Out": Buster, Babs, Plucky and Hamton attend a fancy restaurant called Attitude, where they are treated poorly by the staff. "Paper Trained": While on his paper route, Buster demands subscription money from Montana Max. After Max finally pays, he reads in the paper that the last of his diminished funds was used to pay Buster. "Butt Out": Babs is annoyed by Roderick and Rhubella Rat, who are smoking next to her at a restaurant. She teaches them about the dangers of smoking by posing as a doctor.
17	17	"Rock 'n' Roar"	Art Vitello	Sheryl Scarborough, Jim Reardon & Kayte Kuch	Douglas McCarthy & Bruce Timm	October 8, 1990	406-109
The characters are playing soccer when Buster's ball falls down into a hole. In it, Buster finds what he believes to be hundreds of soccer balls, one of which he believes is his. Actually, it is a dinosaur egg that hatches, leading Buster to attempt raising the young dinosaur, whom he names Rover. After Rover destroys Acme Acres, Buster finds a passageway to the dinosaur world and returns him to his home.
18	18	"Prom-ise Her Anything"	Ken Boyer	Paul Dini & Bob Carrau	Barry Caldwell, John Dorman & Jim Fletcher	October 9, 1990	406-124
After being asked to the prom by Babs, Buster tries to learn how to dance by watching an old Bugs Bunny routine, but performs them poorly until Bugs comes in and assists him. Meanwhile, Elmyra tries to get Montana Max to like her, even though he is instead focusing on the girl that Dizzy has brought.
19	19	"Hare Today, Gone Tomorrow"	Ken Boyer & Eddie Fitzgerald	Wayne Kaatz, Tom Ruegger, Gordon Bressack & Charles Howell	Byron Vaughns, Barry Caldwell & Bob Camp	October 10, 1990	406-101
Buster Bunny is brought home by Elmyra, but tries to escape when he realizes how awful it is. Before leaving, Buster frees the other pets Elmyra has locked up, but he himself is recaptured. Babs, Fifi, Furrball and Tyrone Turtle come to the rescue.
20	20	"Cinemaniacs!"	Art Vitello	Sherri Stoner, Tom Minton & Wayne Kaatz	Barry Caldwell	October 11, 1990	406-102
20	20	"Cinemaniacs!"	Ken Boyer	Jim Reardon	Bob Camp	October 11, 1990	406-102
20	20	"Cinemaniacs!"	Art Vitello	Sherri Stoner & Wayne Kaatz	Byron Vaughns	October 11, 1990	406-102
Wraparounds: Buster and Babs "theater hop" at a multiplex while being chased by usher Montana Max "SuperBabs": A spoof of the Superman film franchise with Babs in the role of Superman and Montana Max as "Wex Wuthor". Superbabs tries to thwart Wex's plot to destroy Acme Acres by pouring ink all over it. "Duck Trek": A spoof of Star Trek with Plucky, Hamton, Furrball (in a rare speaking role) and other characters as the crew members. They land on a planet in search of a toupee for Plucky, but are chased by a hair monster. However, they manage to escape the clutches of the planet's hairs when Hamton worries the planet bald. "Pasadena Jones": A spoof of Indiana Jones with Buster as Indiana Jones. Buster enters a secret temple to find the Secret of Life, which is revealed to be friendship.
21	21	"You Asked for It"	Art Vitello	Sherri Stoner	Alfred Gimeno & Chris Otsuki	October 12, 1990	406-104
21	21	"You Asked for It"	Art Leonardi	Tom Minton & Wayne Kaatz	Douglas McCarthy	October 12, 1990	406-104
21	21	"You Asked for It"	Eddie Fitzgerald	Eddie Fitzgerald & Wayne Kaatz	Bob Camp & Chris Reccardi	October 12, 1990	406-104
Wraparounds: Buster and Babs describe the episode as a "viewer request" day. Plucky invents a machine to pick who will star in each segment, but becomes frustrated when it fails to pick him. "Debutante Devil": Taz gives Dizzy instructions to eat Babs. She then corrects Dizzy's behavior by giving him a finishing school-style routine. "Sleight of Hare": Buster works as a magician's rabbit at Montana Max's birthday party, then gets revenge after the magician quits due to Max's constant interruptions. "Duck Out of Luck": After Plucky makes adjustments to his invention so he will be the only one picked, Buster and Babs reveal they made some adjustments of their own, making it so that the viewers decide what happens to Plucky within the episode. Plucky goes through several transformations and settings.
22	22	"Gang Busters"	Ken Boyer	Wayne Kaatz & Jim Reardon	Byron Vaughns, Barry Caldwell & John Dorman	October 15, 1990	406-112
Montana Max and his gang frame Buster for stealing a slushie machine, and Plucky Duck acts as Buster's lawyer to prove him innocent. However, Buster and Plucky end up imprisoned together and are commended for capturing escapees Rocky and Mugsy in the process of breaking out. To get his revenge on Monty, Buster and company rap until Monty confesses to the crime.
23	23	"Citizen Max"	Art Vitello	Gordon Bressack, Charles Howell, Paul Dini & Tom Ruegger	Bruce Timm & Douglas McCarthy	October 16, 1990	406-121
A Citizen Kane parody with Montana Max in the role of Charles Foster Kane. Hamton interviews the other characters, asking why Max said "Acme", but is unable to find an answer. At the end, it is revealed that he actually said "acne".
24	24	"Wake Up Call of the Wild"	Rich Arons	Tom Minton, Pat Allee, Ben Hurst, Gordon Bressack, Charles M. Howell IV	Byron Vaughns, James Fletcher, Chris Reccardi	October 17, 1990	406-130
Wraparounds: Buster and Babs talk about the "call of the wild" and animal instincts. "Migrant Mallard": Plucky attempts to migrate with a flock of ducks and makes several attempts to modernize them in the process. At the end, the ducks are portrayed flying south while listening to Walkman's. "It's a Jungle Out There": Concord Condor escapes the zoo in search of "wide open spaces". After being pursued by Arnold the Pitbull and other creatures, he returns to the zoo. "Kitty Cat-Astrophe": Furrball fantasizes that he is living in prehistoric times and ends up destroying Hamton's kitchen.
25	25	"Buster and the Wolverine"	Art Leonardi	Tom Ruegger, Paul Dini	Jim Willoughby, Chris Otsuki, Art Leonardi, Alfred Gimeno	October 19, 1990	406-107
In a parody of Peter and the Wolf, conductor Elmyra describes Buster, Babs, Plucky, Hamton, Furrball and Sweetie being pursued by a wolverine. Each character is represented by a musical instrument.
26	26	"You Asked for It: pt. II"	Art Leonardi	Len Janson, Pamela Hickey, Dennys McCoy, Dale Hale	Tony Benedict, Alberto DeMello, Chris Otsuki, Robert Fuentes, Alfred Gimeno	October 22, 1990	406-123
Wraparounds: A second set of "viewer request" episodes. Buster and Babs try to pick names out of a drum, but Dizzy eats the drum. "The Weird Couple": A parody of The Odd Couple. After Dizzy moves into Hamton's house, he becomes tired of Dizzy's destructive nature, but after Dizzy insists on being let back in, the two end up in his cave. "The Return of the Toxic Revenger": Plucky, as the Toxic Revenger, attempts to eliminate Montana Max's factory, which is polluting the sky with smog. "Little Cake of Horrors": Hamton is on a diet and is tempted by a chocolate cake. After dreaming of being tormented by the cake, he calls Dizzy and asks him to eat it.
27	27	"Europe in 30 Minutes"	Arthur Leonardi	Stephen Hibbert	Jessie Cosio, Sheri Weinhart, Chris Otsuki	October 26, 1990	406-142
Plucky wins a tour of Europe on a game show and takes Buster, Babs and Hamton with him. After arriving in England, they meet Princess Diana and Prince Charles, along with a crazed palace chef. Buster and Babs get kidnapped first by two villains, and then thwart the plans of the villains who want to kidnap the royal couple.
28	28	"The Wacko World of Sports"	Kent Butterworth	Gordon Bressack, Charles M. Howell IV, Chuck Menville, Grant Moran, Tom Ruegger	Bob Fuentes, Cosmo Anzilotti, Mike Swanigan	October 30, 1990	406-136
Wraparounds: Buster and Babs describes the sporting activities determined in each segment. "Tennis the Menace": Buster poses as a professional tennis player after discovering that Montana Max has been cheating against his competitors. "Bleacher Bummer": Furrball and Dizzy sneak into a baseball game in which Acme Acres is competing against rival Perfecto Prep. There, the two inadvertently reveal that the rival team has been cheating. "Miniature Goof": Buster and Babs try to play a game of miniature golf on a course owned by Roderick and Rhubella Rat, but after being unfairly treated by the rats, they pose as the Vanderbunnys.
29	29	"Rainy Daze"	Art Leonardi	Jim Reardon, Paul Dini, Barry Caldwell, Wayne Kaatz, Chris Otsuki	Chris Otsuki, Alfred Gimeno, Jim Willoughby, Lew Saw	November 1, 1990	406-115
Wraparounds: Buster and Babs describe what the other characters do on rainy days. "Rent-a-Friend": Montana Max calls a rent-a-friend service, and Buster is sent. Buster then outsmarts Max's attempts to get rid of him. "Bunny Daze": Babs uses her imagination to make household chores fun. "Fur-Gone Conclusion": Buster and Babs accidentally end up in the Arctic, where they protect a baby seal from Gotcha Grabmore, who is scalping seal fur.
30	30	"Fields of Honey"	Ken Boyer	Sherri Stoner, Tom Ruegger	Byron Vaughns, John Dorman, Barry Caldwell	November 2, 1990	406-116
Searching the film vault for a female cartoon character to act as her mentor, Babs discovers Honey of Bosko and Honey. She then builds a theater to show Bosko and Honey shorts, which proves massively popular.
31	31	"Sawdust and Toonsil"	Rich Arons	Gordon Bressack, Charles M. Howell IV	Chris Reccardi, Jim Fletcher (as James Fletcher), Rich Arons	November 5, 1990	406-137
Gogo Dodo and other Wackyland characters are kidnapped by a circus owner, and have to be rescued by Buster, Babs and Plucky.
32	32	"Spring in Acme Acres"	Kent Butterworth, Eddie Fitzgerald	Gordon Bressack, Charles M. Howell IV, Eddie Fitzgerald, Chuck Menville	Eddie Fitzgerald and Doug McCarthy	November 6, 1990	406-135
"Love Among the Toons": Elmer Fudd, as Cupid, gets tired of his job and hires Concord Condor to take his place. Concord proves incompetent, however, and Elmer has to help fix the mistakes that Concord has made. "Elmyra's Spring Cleaning": Elmyra is overzealous in cleaning her house. "That's Incredibly Stupid": Plucky and Dizzy compete on a game show where they have to perform dangerous stunts. Plucky tricks Dizzy into doing the first two stunts, but is then beaten up in the final stunt, which is judging a beauty competition.
33	33	"Psychic Fun-Omenon Day"	Art Leonardi	Jim Reardon, Earl Kress, Tom Ruegger	Ken Mitchroney, Chris Otsuki, Alberto DeMello	November 7, 1990	406-152
Wraparounds: Shirley predicts what will happen to each character by looking into her crystal ball. "Piece of Mind": A parody of This Is Your Life with Wile E. Coyote as the narrator, summarizing Calamity Coyote's life and relationship with Little Beeper as Calamity falls from the top of a very tall building. "Class Cut-Up": In this sequel to One Froggy Evening, Hamton is given a frog to dissect in class, but refuses to do so after he finds that it is still alive and singing. However, it only sings around him and appears dead to everyone else. "Rear Window Pain": In a plot reminiscent of Rear Window, Plucky has been hospitalized and is given a pair of binoculars to look out the window. There, he sees Elmer Fudd growing what he thinks are alien Elmer clones.
34	34	"The Wide World of Elmyra"	Kent Butterworth	Earl Kress, Tom Ruegger, Tom Minton, Paul Dini, Beth Bornstein, Bob Carrau	Owen Fitzgerald, Ric Estrada, Liz Rath, Eddie Fitzgerald	November 8, 1990	406-149
Wraparounds: Buster and Babs act as hosts of a wildlife show. Between each segment, they describe how "dangerous" Elmyra is. "Turtle Hurdle": Tyrone Turtle has just escaped Elmyra's house. He has to cross a busy highway to get to his pond, and is teased by Michigan J. Frog in the process. At the end, Tyrone finally returns to the pond, and Elmyra takes Michigan home. "Drooley Davey": Elmyra has to babysit a salivating baby who dislikes being with her. "Go Fetch": Elmyra plays fetch with Barky Marky against his will. He retaliates by chasing her with a tennis ball machine.
35	35	"A Ditch in Time"	Art Vitello	Wayne Kaatz, Art Vitello, Bruce Timm, Douglas McCarthy	Bruce Timm, Douglas McCarthy (as Doug McCarthy)	November 9, 1990	406-155
Because he has procrastinated on his homework, Plucky invents a time machine and travels back to warn himself to do the homework. In the process, he accidentally sends himself, Buster, and Babs to prehistoric times.
36	36	"Animaniacs!"	Art Vitello	Paul Dini, Tom Minton	Bruce Timm, Douglas McCarthy (as Doug McCarthy)	November 12, 1990	406-145
Buster shows Plucky how to make a cartoon as part of his class assignment. Plucky wins first prize at the film festival, but the prize is to take the course over, since he skipped most of it the first time.
37	37	"Career Oppor-Toon-ities"	Art Leonardi	Gordon Bressack, Charles M. Howell IV, David Cohen, Roger S. Schulman, Sherri Stoner	Chris Otsuki, Alfred Gimeno, Tom Minton	November 13, 1990	406-111
Wraparounds: Buster details the virtues of having a part-time job. "Buster's Guide to Part-Time Jobs": Buster walks Babs though a step-by-step course on how to get a job. Buster and Babs end up at Weenie Burger, waiting on an unruly Montana Max. "Working Pig": Hamton must attend to a customer in the toy department in order to get promoted to cleaning supplies. Unfortunately, that customer is Elmyra. "Falling to Pizzas": A penniless Calamity Coyote attempts to steal a pizza from Little Beeper, who is working as a delivery boy.
38	38	"Strange Tales of Weird Science"	Eddie Fitzgerald, Art Leonardi (credited as Alan Smithee)	Eddie Fitzgerald, Earl Kress, Tom Minton	Alfred Gimeno, Bob Camp, Lorenzo Martinez, Chris Otsuki	November 14, 1990	406-103
Wraparounds: Buster and Babs introduce the various segments dressed in lab coats. "Scentimental Pig": Hamton accidentally spills a compound on his pants that was intended to make dog food palatable, and the other characters, including best friend Plucky, attempt to eat him. "Pit Bullied": Furrball is conditioned by Sweetie not to eat birds, but to seek out dogs instead. So Furrball pursues Arnold the Pit Bull instead. "Duck in the Muck": Plucky, as The Toxic Revenger, attempts to keep Montana Max from disposing of toxic sludge in Plucky's pond.
39	39	"Inside Plucky Duck"	Art Vitello	Paul Dini, Buzz Dixon; Story by : Bruce Timm, Art Vitello	Bruce Timm and Douglas McCarthy	November 15, 1990	406-129
Wraparounds: Buster, Babs, and Calamity take a fantastic voyage into Plucky Duck's head. "Bat's All Folks": The origin story of another of Plucky's heroic egos, Batduck. "Wild Takes Class": Plucky demonstrates some of Daffy's advanced wild takes and ends up stuck as a giant eyeball.
40	40	"The Acme Bowl"	Ken Boyer	Stephen Langford, Debra Blanchard, Tom Ruegger, Paul Dini	Byron Vaughns and Barry Caldwell	November 16, 1990	406-120
The Acme Acres football team has not won a single game all season, but Buster declares that the upcoming game against Perfecto Prep will be different, as he has a secret play book. Plucky acts as a double agent to Perfecto Prep so that he can get a scholarship, but rethinks things when Lil' Sneezer is dismayed at his underhanded tactics.
41	41	"Dating, Acme Acres Style"	Gerard Baldwin, Ken Boyer, Rich Arons	Tom Ruegger, Sherri Stoner, Paul Dini	Ken Mitchroney, Chris Reccardi, Rich Arons, Doug McCarthy	November 19, 1990	406-114
"Buster's Guide to Dating": Buster and Babs give instructions for a first date. "Love Stinks": One of Calamity Coyote's attempts to catch Little Beeper makes him look like a skunk and the object of Fifi's affection. "The Dream Date Game": Buster and Babs trick Montana Max into participating on a dating game show where the bachlorette is Elmyra.
42	42	"Looniversity Daze"	Gerard Baldwin	Paul Dini, Eddie Fitzgerald, Jim Reardon, Stephen Langford	Eddie Fitzgerald, Tom Minton, Ron Campbell	November 20, 1990	406-110
Wraparounds: Buster and Babs sing songs about Acme Looniversity. "The Learning Principal": Buster is sent to the principal's office by Yosemite Sam. "Eating Between the Lines": Sweetie pursues Bookworm at the Looniversity library. "What's Up, Nurse?": Plucky fakes being sick to get out of a test. Unfortunately for him, the nurse's office is run by Elmyra.
43	43	"Best o' Plucky Duck Day"	Rich Arons	Beth Bornstein, Paul Dini, Eddie Fitzgerald, Tom Minton, Tom Ruegger	Byron Vaughns, Robert Fuentes, John Dorman, Rich Arons	November 21, 1990	406-118
"One Minute 'Till Three": Plucky is eager to get out of school and start his weekend. But the clock will not let him, and Granny the teacher keeps handing out lengthy term papers for wrong answers. "Sticky Feathers Duck": Plucky and Hamton steal an Acme Super Duper Munch 'n Crunch Bar (with almonds) from a convenience store and suffer guilt. They return to the store to confess to the storekeeper, who tells them that while he appreciates their honesty, he will call the police if he ever sees them in his store again. "Duck in the Dark": Plucky spends the night at Buster's place, and has a nightmare thanks to an overdose of horror movies throughout the evening; notable for featuring "Eddy Cougar", a parody of Freddy Krueger.
44	44	"Hero Hamton"	Gerard Baldwin	Gordon Bressack, Charles M. Howell IV	Eddie Fitzgerald, Chris Reccardi, Pierre DeCelles	November 23, 1990	406-106
Hamton mistakenly hits Montana Max with his locker door and Max threatens to hit him. Plucky makes it even worse when he forces Hamton to have a boxing match with Max. Hamton tries to get out of the whole situation, but his friends help him with physical and spiritual training. On the night of the fight, Hamton is sitting in Porky's prop class feeling sorry for himself, and Buster and Babs take his place in the ring. When Hamton sees his friends get beat up and bounced around like basketballs, he uses the power of his ancestors (and Porky's props) to get even with Max, who chickens out.
45	45	"Whale's Tales"	Kent Butterworth	Nicholas Hollander	Owen Fitzgerald, Lelia Green, Larry Leker	November 26, 1990	406-154
Elmyra finds a lost baby whale and keeps it as a pet. Buster and Babs convince Elmyra that the whale has to be returned to its mother, who is being held prisoner by the evil Gotcha Grabmore, maker of whale-based beauty products.
46	46	"Ask Mr. Popular"	Rich Arons	Paul Dini, Therese Naugle	Jeff Lynch and Bruce Morris	December 4, 1990	406-141
Wraparounds: Buster Bunny (as Mr. Popular) gives advice. "Dapper Diz": Buster, Plucky and Hamton literally turn Dizzy Devil in to a proper gentleman. But Dizzy is miserable in this form. "A Pigment of His Imagination": Feeling rejected, Hamton creates his own imaginary friend who treats him like a jerk.
47	47	"Son of Looniversity Daze"	Gerard Baldwin	Tom Minton, Buzz Dixon	Jim Fletcher and Chris Reccardi	December 7, 1990	406-134
"Plucky's Dastardly Deed": Plucky cheats on a test and later feels guilty about it. "Open and Shut Case": Hamton is rewarded with a new hi-tech locker for his good grades that refuses to give him his lunch, even upon inputting the correct deactivation code. "C Flat or B Sharp": Buster, Plucky, and Hamton must retrieve a piano from the Looniversity tower and present it to Yosemite Sam.
48	48	"Mr. Popular's Rules of Cool"	Art Vitello	Gordon Bressack, Jim Reardon, Charles M. Howell IV	Doug McCarthy and Bruce Timm	December 10, 1990	406-160
"Mr. Popular's Rules of Cool": Buster (as Mr. Popular) and Babs try to turn Hamton into a cool dude. "Slugfest": Plucky and Hamton pretend to be the Immature Radioactive Samurai Slugs which soon leads them face to face with the Slugs' enemy, the Iodizer. "Venison Anyone?": Montana Max goes deer hunting and faces a street-smart deer named Vinnie.
49	49	"Fairy Tales for the 90's"	Ken Boyer	Tom Ruegger, Tom Minton, Gordon Bressack, Jim Reardon	Ken Boyer	December 12, 1990	406-143
Wraparounds: Babs, as Tinkerbunny, faces total chaos just from setting up modern fairy tales. "Bunnochio": A failing toy company mistakes Buster for their newest brainstorm. "Bear Necessities": Elmyra is the Goldilocks of the modern retelling of the Three Bears story.
50	50	"Who Bopped Bugs Bunny?"	Kent Butterworth	Paul Dini, Earl Kress, Sherri Stoner	J.C. Wegman, Eddie Fitzgerald, Mike Kazaleh	December 14, 1990	406-144
A parody of Who Framed Roger Rabbit. A jealous toon named Sappy Stanley tries to eliminate Bugs and frame Daffy for the crime. Luckily, Buster and Babs are on the case.
51	51	"Tiny Toon Music Television"	Art Vitello	Sherri Stoner, Paul Dini, Tom Minton, Art Vitello, Bruce Timm, Douglas McCarthy	Douglas McCarthy (as Doug McCarthy), Bruce Timm	February 1, 1991	406-163
A collection of music videos, starring the Tiny Toons cast, for the following: "Istanbul": Plucky and Hamton are hired to retrieve a stolen statue from Montana Max. "Particle Man": Plucky takes on various wrestlers and loses. "Respect": Starring Babs. "Money": Starring Montana Max. "Top Secret Apprentice": In a spoof of Fantasia 's "The Sorcerer's Apprentice" segment, Buster decides to play with Bugs' new cartoon creator.
52	52	"The Return of the Acme Acres Zone"	Kent Butterworth	Wayne Kaatz, Kent Zbornak, Tom Minton, Mike Kazaleh, Maurice Noble	Warren Greenwood, Umberto DeLaFuente, Mike Kazaleh	February 4, 1991	406-159
Another version of the Acme Acres Zone, this time starring Babs. "Real Kids Don't Like Broccoli": In the future, Buster is a detective on the case of missing droids. "Boo Ha Ha": Plucky and Hamton stay at a haunted mansion and get haunted by a ghost. "Duck Dodgers Jr.": Plucky is Duck Dodgers' new eager young space cadet.
53	53	"The Acme Home Shopping Show"	Eddie Fitzgerald (uncredited), Rich Arons	Sherri Stoner, Paul Dini	Jim Fletcher, Chris Reccardi, Garrett Ho	February 6, 1991	406-161
Wraparounds: Buster and Babs host their own shopping show. "Oh, for Art's Sake": Plucky pauses a dog and cat fight and claims it to be his own painting. "Teddy Bears' Picnic": Elmyra follows the Looney Tunes' Three Bears to an outdoor picnic. "I Was a Teenage Bunny Sitter": Babs babysits a small rabbit kid named Duncan.
54	54	"Weirdest Story Ever Told"	Art Leonardi	Gordon Kent, Paul Dini	Ken Mitchroney, Alberto DeMello, Jim Smith	February 8, 1991	406-157
Wraparounds: Buster and Babs spend their day at the Looniversity library and are told to be quiet by librarian Foghorn Leghorn. "Robin Hare": A Tiny Toons version of Robin Hood starring Buster Bunny. "To Babs or Not to Babs": Babs is determined to become a star in Shakespeare's newest play. "Elmyra's 'Round the World": Buster dreams that Elmyra's worldwide relatives have their eyes on him, too.
55	55	"Viewer Mail Day"	Art Leonardi (as Arthur Leonardi)	Paul Dini, Arleen Sorkin, Beth Milstein, Tom Minton, Wayne Kaatz	Ken Mitchroney, Jim Smith, Alberto De Mello	February 11, 1991	406-162
Wraparounds: Buster and Babs decide to read their fan mail. "Pluck 'o the Irish": Plucky and Hamton travel to Ireland and deal with a Banshee. "Out of Odor": Elmyra pursues Fifi, convinced that she is a purple kitty. "Buttering Up the Buttfields": Junior waiter Plucky Duck must tend to an important, high class, big-butted couple named the Buttfields.
56	56	"Son of the Wacko World of Sports"	Rich Arons	Jim Reardon, Grant Moran, Tom Minton, Tom Ruegger, Earl Kress	Jim Fletcher, Chris Reccardi, Garrett Ho	February 12, 1991	406-156
"Buster at the Bat": Sylvester narrates the Tiny Toons version of a classic poem called Casey at the Bat with a surprise ending. "Buster's New Bike": Buster gets a new bike from a crooked dealer named Bicycle Bob. "Acme Acres' Summer Olympics"": The students of Acme Looniversity and Perfecto Prep compete in various sporting events.
57	57	"Pollution Solution"	Ken Boyer	Sherri Stoner, M.D. Sweeney, Jim Reardon	John Dorman	February 14, 1991	406-139
Wraparounds: Babs, as Tinkerbunny, has no choice but to do all the cleaning in Acme Acres the hard way. "No Deposit, No Return of the Trash Bag Despenser": Plucky must teach Elmyra a lesson in recycling using another new heroic ego, the Trash Bag Dispenser. "Jungle Bungle": Buster and Babs must deal with a villain named Ronald Grump in order to save a rain forest. "Waste Deep in Wackyland": Montana Max dumps all of his factory's pollution in Wackyland resulting in a harsh lesson from Gogo Dodo.
58	58	"You Asked for It, Again"	Ken Boyer	Tom Minton, Nicholas Hollander	Warren Greenwood and Tony Craig	February 15, 1991	406-153
"Buster's Guide to Goofing Off": Buster teaches how to procrastinate on your homework. "Elmyra at the Mall": Elmyra's love for animals gets her locked in the mall while it is being robbed by two burglars. "Hold the Sugar": A colony of ants learn how much trouble a sugar addiction can get them into.
59	59	"Brave Tales of Real Rabbits"	Rich Arons	Eddie Fitzgerald, Earl Kress, Tom Minton, Jim Reardon	Jim Fletcher, Chris Reccardi, Jim Gomez	February 18, 1991	406-151
Wraparounds: Buster and Babs do their own version of Masterpiece Theatre entitled Masterhare Theater. "And All That Rot": In this parody of the Sherlock Holmes stories, Brainy Domes (Buster) and Flotsom (Babs) go searching for the Queen's (Elmyra's) missing jewels with Montiority (Monty) as their prime suspect. But they are in for a surprise when it turns out that they might be trying to track down the wrong jewels. "Day for Knight": Sir Buster goes on a quest to save Babs from a dragon.
60	60	"How Sweetie It Is"	Ken Boyer, Art Leonardi	Sherri Stoner, Nicholas Hollander, Paul Dini	Warren Greenwood and Byron Vaughns	February 19, 1991	406-158
Wraparounds: Sweetie is so upset that Buster and Babs star in all the episodes, and demands she gets one for herself. "Egged on Eagle": Sweetie is the daughter of a bald eagle. "Let's Do Lunch": Elmyra allows Furrball to stay in her house on the one condition that he does not try to eat Sweetie. Sweetie takes advantage of this and tries to goad Furrball into eating her. "The Raven": Sweetie is the raven in the classic Edgar Allan Poe story, only more annoying.
61	61	"New Character Day"	Ken Boyer, Eddie Fitzgerald	Sherri Stoner, Eddie Fitzgerald	Barry Caldwell and Eddie Fitzgerald	February 20, 1991	406-164
Wraparounds: Buster and Babs audition new characters to appear on the show. "The Roches": Give a performance at Hamton's house. "The Return of Pluck Twacy": Unconscious, Plucky dreams he is a detective searching for Shirley's missing, evil aura, in this homage to The Great Piggy Bank Robbery.
62	62	"Here's Hamton"	Rich Arons	Tom Minton, Tom Ruegger, Jim Reardon, Grant Moran	Jim Fletcher, Chris Reccardi, Charlie Bean, Garrett Ho	February 22, 1991	406-146
Wraparounds: Hamton is featured in parodies of famous TV intros. "Milk, It Makes a Body Spout": Buster and Plucky compete to see who can be the first one to make Hamton shoot milk out his nose. "America's Least Wanted": When Plucky learns that Hamton has a criminal double named Knuckles Cutlet, he decides to turn Hamton in for a reward. "Drawn and Buttered": Hamton buys a mischievous lobster to cook for dinner.
63	63	"No Toon Is an Island"	Art Leonardi	Gordon Bressack, Charles M. Howell IV	Ken Mitchroney, Chris Otsuki, Alberto DeMello	February 25, 1991	406-147
Buster, Babs, Plucky and Hamton discover a treasure map and let greed get in the way of their friendship.
64	64	"KACME TV"	Kent Butterworth, Art Leonardi, Ken Boyer	Paul Dini, Sherri Stoner, Tom Ruegger	Larry Leker, Byron Vaughns, Barry Caldwell	February 26, 1991	406-165
A collection of TV parodies starring the Tiny Toons cast. Some of the targets are Super Mario Bros., Jeopardy, I Love Lucy, Calvin Klein's Obsession, The Wonder Years, Honey, I Shrunk the Kids, The People's Court, and Lucky Charms.
65	65	"High Toon"	Glen Kennedy	Chuck Menville	John Flagg	March 29, 1991	406-150
Buster and Babs take a wrong turn on their way to Acmeland and end up in Prairie Junction, a western town troubled by the Coyote Kid and his gang of outlaws.

=== Season 2 (1991–92) ===
No. overall	No. in season	Title	Directed by	Written by	Storyboard by	Original release date	Prod. code
66	1	"Pledge Day"	Barry Caldwell Norman McCabe Kent Butterworth	Sherri Stoner Paul Dini and Chris Otsuki Nicholas Hollander	Alberto DeMello, Warren Greenwood, Ken Micherony Jr., Byron Vaughns, Patricia Wong	September 16, 1991	406-168
Wraparounds: Donations for the Pledge Week have an empty grand total. "It's All Relatives": Babs' playdate with Buster is prevented by a visit from her grandmother which gives her a hard time. "Lifeguard Lunacy": Calamity tries to be Arnold's junior lifeguard as best he can, with Elmyra getting in the way. "The Kite": As Hamton is flying a kite at the beach, a moth sticks with the kite, thinking that it is his new-found friend.
67	2	"Going Places"	Rich Arons, Eddie Fitzgerald	Earl Kress Nick Hollander Gordon Bressack	Rusty Mills, Greg Reyna, Chris Dent, Eddie Fitzgerald, Kenneth Harsha, Enrique May, Jim Fletcher (as James Fletcher), Mike Fontanelli	September 17, 1991	406-167
Wraparounds: The Tiny Toons are going on a field trip to see people at work. "When You're Hot": At the Acme Firehouse, Pete Puma teaches about fire and safety. In his dangerous demonstrations he sets the school on fire. Plucky, Buster and Hamton try to put out the 'Flame' that spreads. They manage to defeat the 'Flame', but not before the Looniversity is completely destroyed in the process. "That's Art Folks!": At the Acme Art Museum, Babs has a distaste for paintings. After getting a hit on the head, she dreams about an art world where everyone shuns her. "Slaughterhouse Jive": At Max's Merry Meats Company, the Tiny Toons are shown how meats are manufactured. After they avoid getting caught in the production line, they convince Max to shut down his factory.
68	3	"Elephant Issues"	Byron Vaughns, Ken Boyer	Story by : Sherri Stoner; Teleplay by : Stephen Hibbert Story by : Sherri Stoner; Teleplay by : Mark Saraceni Story by : Wayne Kaatz; Teleplay by : Nicholas Hollander	Joe Banaskiewicz, Flamarion Ferreira, Garrett Ho, Cynthia Petrovic, Tony Craig, Warren Greenwood, Kaan Kalyon, Patricia Wong	September 18, 1991	406-169
Wraparounds: Gogo explains that today's episode is going to deal with serious social issues. "Why Dizzy Can't Read": Buster and Babs discover that Dizzy Devil cannot read because he wastes his time watching television. "C.L.I.D.E. and Prejudice": A robot student named C.L.I.D.E. joins Acme Looniversity, and turns to Buster for help after being teased by Montana Max. "One Beer": Buster, Plucky and Hamton become intoxicated after finding an unopened bottle of beer, steal a cop car, take the car to a tall mountain, and "kill" themselves by driving the car off the mountain.
69	4	"Hog-Wild Hamton"	Rich Arons	Paul Dini and Bob Carrau	Rusty Mills, Jim Fletcher (as James Fletcher), Enrique May	September 19, 1991	406-171
Hamton's parents have left him in charge of the house for the weekend. Plucky seizes this opportunity to throw a party. However all the Looniversity students show up at the house, disturbing his neighbour Egghead Junior to the point of blowing up the house to Hamton's despair.
70	5	"Playtime Toons"	Art Leonardi, Byron Vaughns	Nicholas Hollander Paul Dini Story by : Sherri Stoner; Teleplay by : Charlie Howell	Alberto DeMello, Flamarion Ferreira, James Fletcher, Quintin Henson, Ken Micherony Jr., Chris Osuki, Patricia Wong	September 20, 1991	406-166
Wraparounds: Buster introduces Fantastic Toyland. "Happy Birthday Hamton": Babs, Plucky and Buster head to the mall to get the perfect toys for Hamton's birthday. However, they buy toys they would rather keep for themselves. Instead, they give away their old toys and later regret it. At the end, Hamton discloses that it is not really his birthday. "Fit to Be Toyed": Montana Max demolishes his toys, which displeases his father. Max is left with nothing but his imagination and a paddle ball. Eventually Max's imagination pays off. "Strung Along Kitty": Furrball chases and plays with Mary Melody's hair ribbon all over town.
71	6	"Toon Physics"	Art Leonardi	Story by : Tom Ruegger; Teleplay by : Nicholas Hollander Dale Hale Chris Otsuki and Dale Hale	Alberto DeMello, Quintin Henson, Thomas Yakutis	November 4, 1991	406-170
Wraparounds: Orson Whales teaches the Tiny Toons' "toon physics". "Once Upon a Star": Elmyra wishes upon a star that her Barbette doll would come to life. Her wish comes true, but Barbette proves to be a big handful, and her attractive looks make Elmyra envious. "A Cub for Grub": Furrball goes after Li'l Sneezer, who is going to a Boy Scout camp. Li'l Sneezer's knowledge on camping hinders Furrball's attempts. "The Year Book Star": Plucky tries to ensure that he gets his picture the most places in the yearbook. In response to his self-centered attitude, Babs makes sure Plucky gets humiliating photo shots. At the photo counting session, Babs and Plucky find that Buster tricked them to prove a point.
72	7	"Acme Cable TV"	Alfred Gimeno, David West (co-director)	Paul Dini, Nicholas Hollander, Tom Ruegger, Peter Hastings	Eddie Fitzgerald, Quintin Henson, Ken Micherony Jr., Patricia Wong, Thomas Yakutis	November 11, 1991	406-179
Having caught the "Taiwan flu", Babs and Buster watch their new Acme Cable TV, which shows parodies of all sorts of popular shows and commercials. It is revealed at the end of the cartoon that the bunnies have become literal couch potatoes.
73	8	"Buster and Babs Go Hawaiian"	Art Leonardi (uncredited)	Renee Carter, Sarah Creef, Amy Crosby	Ken Mitchroney Jr., Chris Otsuki, Quintin Henson	November 18, 1991	406-173
Buster and Babs put a halt to Hamton's show since they are not in it. They go to Steven Spielberg's office and get placed in a script written by 13-year-olds, wherein both go to Hawaii. Upon arriving in Hawaii, Buster and Babs immediately have their cash stolen, but luckily Buster is using Bugs's gold card without permission. After their Hawaiian adventure, Buster and Babs are given a new assignment: "Buster and Babs Go to Mars". This episode was chiefly written by three regular viewers (Renee Carter, Sarah Cleef and Amy Crosby), who also appear in animated form on the show. Their contribution to the series inspired the writing of "The Front", an episode of The Simpsons. Also, Steven Spielberg cameos as himself.
74	9	"Henny Youngman Day"	Jon McClenahan	Sherri Stoner Tom Ruegger Story by : Nicholas Hollander and Kevin Frank; Teleplay by : Shecky Hollander and Boom-Boom Stoner	Barry Johnson, Tony Craig, Mark Kennedy, Ash Brennon, Ken Boyer, Alfred Gimeno, Randy Haycock, Flamarion Ferreira	November 22, 1991	406-174
Wraparounds: In Daffy Duck's absence, Henny Youngman (in caricature as an actual chicken) is teaching the class, making everyone but Hamton bored. "Stand-Up and Deliver": Babs is about to star on stage for the 'Open Mic' show. After all the shambles of performers play their part, Red Robin Gillams seems to best Babs, but Robin saves Babs from certain doom. "The Potty Years": In his potty years, Plucky Duckling did not feel like toilet training but the flush made him try. All he managed to do was overflow the toilet by flushing a lot of objects down it. "Lame Joke": Buster is disappointed that his joke is lame, but his friends eventually figure out what is funny about it.
75	10	"Love Disconnection"	Byron Vaughns	Paul Dini, Arleen Sorkin, Beth Milstein	Barry Caldwell, Thomas Ellery, Flamarion Ferreira, Warren Greenwood, Kenneth Harsha, Marc Perry, Patricia Wong	November 25, 1991	406-172
Wraparounds: Buster hosts the game show Love Disconnection just like Chuck Woolery hosting Love Connection. "My Dinner with Elmyra": Montana Max's parents are going for dinner with the Duff parents and Max unwillingly takes Elmyra to the restaurant where he is teased. Later, Max and Elmyra go to the cinema, watching Max's least favorite movie The Adventures of Fido and Mewmew. Max changes his sour tune when Elmyra kisses him at the end of the date. "The Amazing Three": Tired of their friends' immature habits, Babs, Shirley and Fifi decide to go to the senior dance of rival Perfecto Prep to date older guys, with unforeseen consequences.
76	11	"Kon Ducki"	Rich Arons	Sherri Stoner, Peter Hastings, Stephen Hibbert	Eddie Fitzgerald, Jim Fletcher (as James Fletcher), Enrique May, Rusty Mills	February 10, 1992	406-184
"The Voyage of the Kon Ducki": A spoof of the Kon Tiki expedition. To prove that his ancestors never flew from Yap to Salinas, but instead sailed there in the "ancient" 1970s, Pluck Heyerdahl gets Koom-Bye-Ya and his parrot to help him build a raft and sail the seas in 21 days. The journey is pretty difficulty in that Heyerdahl keeps swapping his leadership with Koom-Bye-Ya. They get caught in a storm but are washed ashore at the Salinas. "The Making of Kon Ducki": Buster narrates the making of the Kon Ducki movie written, directed and produced by Plucky Duck.
77	12	"Sepulveda Boulevard"	Byron Vaughns	Deanna Oliver	Barry Caldwell, Jim Fletcher (as James Fletcher), Ken Harsha (as Kenneth Harsha), David Schwartz, Charles Visser, Pat Wong (as Patricia Wong)	February 17, 1992	406-185
Montana Max is in a mess. Five years ago, he tried to plagiarise Plucky Duck's script and hid in the Cutesy Toon mansion on Sepulveda Boulevard, resided by Elmyra Desmond, Hamton and Furrball from the 30s. Max's stay became a torment until he formulated a plan to steal Elmyra's script ideas. After months of work between Elmyra's constant torment, Max finally finished. Hamton delivered the script to the Warner Bros. studio, but Plucky entitled it as his own. At the studio, Furrball was picked to star in a new production. That night Elmyra realized that she had been duped and disposed of Max in the gutter where Max started his story. Elmyra's filming is cut short. Max, Elmyra and Plucky go after Daville who stole their entire life's work. This episode is narrated by Danny Cooksey, the voice of Montana Max.
78	13	"Take Elmyra Please"	Ken Boyer	Story by : Nicholas Hollander; Teleplay by : M.D. Sweeney and John McCann	Joey Banaszkiewicz, Tony Craig, Kaan Kalyon, Brian Mitchell	February 24, 1992	406-177
In the Duff residence, the Duffs do their usual strange routines, when Mr. Duff announces that he has invented an environmentally friendly fuel and Elmyra thinks that she is going on a TV show. The news spreads to an industrial boss named Arthur Jabba, who is determined to protect his business from the new fuel. He sends George and Lennard to kidnap Mr. Duff, but instead they take Elmyra and Furrball for ransom. Duncan tries to tell the distracted family that he witnessed Elmyra's kidnapping; meanwhile, George and Lennard are having a hard time keeping Elmyra under control, who thinks that she is in a TV studio. Finally they get tired of Elmyra, surrender to the police, and give Jabba away.

=== Tiny Toon Adventures: How I Spent My Vacation (1992) ===
Title	Directed by	Written by	Storyboard by	Release date	Prod. code
Tiny Toon Adventures: How I Spent My Vacation	Rich Arons, Byron Vaughns, Alfred Gimeno, Barry Caldwell, Ken Boyer, Art Leonardi, Kent Butterworth	Paul Dini, Nicholas Hollander, Tom Ruegger, Sherri Stoner	Rich Arons, Ken Boyer, Yi-Chi Chin, Jill Colbert, Umberto DeLaFuente, Daniel de la Vega, Alberto De Mello, Flamarion Ferreira, Ian Findley, Paul Fisher, Eddie Fitzgerald, Jim Fletcher, Alfred Gimeno, Warren Greenwood, Dan Haskett, Tenny Henson, Garrett Ho, Enrique May, Douglas McCarthy, Chris Reccardi, Lenord Robinson, Byron Vaughns	March 17, 1992	406-197
Tiny Toon Adventures: How I Spent My Vacation	Rich Arons, Byron Vaughns, Alfred Gimeno, Barry Caldwell, Ken Boyer, Art Leonardi, Kent Butterworth	Paul Dini, Nicholas Hollander, Tom Ruegger, Sherri Stoner	Rich Arons, Ken Boyer, Yi-Chi Chin, Jill Colbert, Umberto DeLaFuente, Daniel de la Vega, Alberto De Mello, Flamarion Ferreira, Ian Findley, Paul Fisher, Eddie Fitzgerald, Jim Fletcher, Alfred Gimeno, Warren Greenwood, Dan Haskett, Tenny Henson, Garrett Ho, Enrique May, Douglas McCarthy, Chris Reccardi, Lenord Robinson, Byron Vaughns	March 17, 1992	406-198
Tiny Toon Adventures: How I Spent My Vacation	Rich Arons, Byron Vaughns, Alfred Gimeno, Barry Caldwell, Ken Boyer, Art Leonardi, Kent Butterworth	Paul Dini, Nicholas Hollander, Tom Ruegger, Sherri Stoner	Rich Arons, Ken Boyer, Yi-Chi Chin, Jill Colbert, Umberto DeLaFuente, Daniel de la Vega, Alberto De Mello, Flamarion Ferreira, Ian Findley, Paul Fisher, Eddie Fitzgerald, Jim Fletcher, Alfred Gimeno, Warren Greenwood, Dan Haskett, Tenny Henson, Garrett Ho, Enrique May, Douglas McCarthy, Chris Reccardi, Lenord Robinson, Byron Vaughns	March 17, 1992	406-199
Tiny Toon Adventures: How I Spent My Vacation	Rich Arons, Byron Vaughns, Alfred Gimeno, Barry Caldwell, Ken Boyer, Art Leonardi, Kent Butterworth	Paul Dini, Nicholas Hollander, Tom Ruegger, Sherri Stoner	Rich Arons, Ken Boyer, Yi-Chi Chin, Jill Colbert, Umberto DeLaFuente, Daniel de la Vega, Alberto De Mello, Flamarion Ferreira, Ian Findley, Paul Fisher, Eddie Fitzgerald, Jim Fletcher, Alfred Gimeno, Warren Greenwood, Dan Haskett, Tenny Henson, Garrett Ho, Enrique May, Douglas McCarthy, Chris Reccardi, Lenord Robinson, Byron Vaughns	March 17, 1992	406-200
The Tiny Toon Adventures characters leave for their summer vacations after their term at Acme Looniversity ends. Plucky rides with Hamton and his family to Happy World Land; Buster and Babs' water fight leads to an unexpected river journey; Fowlmouth pesters Shirley the Loon into taking him into the movies; Fifi La Fume meets her celebrity crush, movie star Johnny Pew; and Dizzy sheds his fur and starts a fashion trend among skaters in The Little Mermaid.

=== Season 3 (1992) ===
No. overall	No. in season	Title	Directed by	Written by	Storyboard by	Original release date	Prod. code
79	1	"Thirteensomething"	Jon McClenahan	Sherri Stoner	Tony Craig, Jim Fletcher (as James Fletcher), Jon McClenahan, John Hayes, Lou Police, Brian Mitchell, Joey Banaszkiewicz	September 14, 1992	406-178
Buster and Babs are going to watch TV tonight and Babs' choice of Thirteensomething is decided. Babs decides to audition for Thirteensomething on a bet with Buster. Babs reaches New York City, while Buster fails to find a replacing co-star. Babs disguises herself as a lady called Babs Bunnawalskioversmith to audition and wins the part. Despite the new fame, Babs begins to miss Buster, and vice versa. During the next show taping, Buster shows up. He and Babs divulge their true identities before they make their escape. Gag credit: The character of "Flint" is in no way based on Flint Dille. - Honest, Flint. No, really.
80	2	"New Class Day"	Byron Vaughns	Paul Dini, Sherri Stoner	Barry Caldwell, Kenneth Harsha, Butch Lukic, Doug Murphy, Charles Visser, Patricia Wong	September 15, 1992	406-181
Wraparounds: Buster and Babs attend new classes for the semester. "The Just-Us League of Supertoons": Batduck (Plucky) and Decoy the Pig Hostage (Hamton) meet Superbun (Buster), Little Dasher (Little Beeper), Hawk Loon (Shirley), Wonder Babs, Aqua Mutt (Byron Basset), Pink Canary (Sweetie), Keen Arrow (Calamity) and Scentana (Fifi) but they are both dismissed. Wex Wuthor (Montana Max) attacks the heroes and Batduck stops him. "Sound Off": In this dialogue-less short, Buster takes Babs to go to a picnic with all the other Tiny Toons, when Dizzy comes and spoils it. Buster and Babs get Dizzy in a chase until they trap him in an ink bottle. "A Night in Kokomo": In a parody of the Marx Brothers, Susan Writtenhouse III meets up with Dr. Hackensack (Babs) and Chik-O-Lina (Buster) at a hotel to arrange an important bank payment with Mr. Mayonnaise at dinner tonight. Gag credit: Black and white - Is cheaper to paint
81	3	"Fox Trot"	Ken Boyer	Peter Hastings, Deanna Oliver, Tom Ruegger	Tony Craig, Brian Mitchell, Louis Police	September 16, 1992	406-190
Wraparounds: Babs and Buster are being chased by a couple of foxes (who Buster refers to as "Fox network executives"). "My Brilliant Revenge": Hamton destroys Plucky's bagpipes since it made him miss his annual TV show. Plucky plans revenge but Hamton settles the matter with an apology. "Can't Buy Me Love": A new neighbour called Rhoda Queen arrives in town. Elmyra's eager to become friends with her, but Rhoda is a spoiled brat who threatens to break up with Elmyra unless her demands are met. "Phone Call from the 405": Babs gets a call from Steven, who is not happy with the scene's progress. Buster and Babs and attempt to get the scene right, but in the end, they get tired of Steven and include him in the chase. Gag credit: Steven's Car Phone # - 555-5555 ($1.95 Per Minute)
82	4	"What Makes Toons Tick?"	Byron Vaughns	Dale Hale Story by : Tom Ruegger; Teleplay by : Nicholas Hollander Beth Bornstein and Paul Dini	Edward Baker, Keith Tucker, Barry Caldwell, Charles Visser, Patricia Wong	September 17, 1992	406-189
Wraparounds: Buster and Calamity demonstrate a time machine to observe the Tiny Toons' early lives. "Whirlwind Romance": Every toon couple is having a romantic time, except for Dizzy, who would rather play, and he falls in love with a cyclone, thinking that it is another Tasmanian Devil. "Going Up": Plucky Duckling requests his mother to take him on the elevator. Plucky rides on it once and then swaps places with Baby Babs to ride it again and thwarts a robbery. This is a follow-up to the segment "The Potty Years" from episode 406-174. "Nothing to Sneeze At": After failing to scare Hamton, closet monster Oogie tries to put a scare on Li'l Sneezer, but the scaring delights Li'l Sneezer rather than frightens him, and what is worse, his explosive sneezing proves too much for Oogie to handle. Gag credit: What these three cartoons have in common - Nothing
83	5	"Flea for Your Life"	Ken Boyer, Tony Craig	Wayne Kaatz	Joey Banaszkiewicz, Tony Craig, Mark Fisher, Brian Mitchell, Lou Police	September 18, 1992	406-186
The daughter of the flea family, Itchy, becomes tired of the usual routine on Furrball. To make matters worse, the Tick is becoming demanding on the supply of fur coats Itchy crafts and wants her to marry him or her family can be in danger. Itchy goes with Gnat to check out the Tick's home on Byron Basset and finds the Tick is hoarding fleas' resources and not distributing them. With difficulty Gnat manages to reunite Itchy with her family. This episode is a follow-up to the Season 1 episode "Starting from Scratch". In addition, both episodes are parodies of the Amblin production An American Tail, an animated movie about a young mouse undergoing similar experiences. Gag credit: It didn't work on paper - It doesn't work on film.
84	6	"The Return of Batduck"	Rich Arons	Peter Hastings	Jim Fletcher (as James Fletcher), Eddie Fitzgerald, Rusty Mills, Jenny Lerew	September 19, 1992	406-097
After a ridiculous attempt to establish his own show, Plucky wants to be in Batman Returns. He goes with Hamton to the studio to talk with Tim Burton. With difficulty they make it to his office. Tim is not willing to give Plucky a screen test, but Plucky manages to convince him. Plucky and Hamton ready themselves with their Batduck and Decoy costumes and props. His screen test is a disaster, but he gets his part. At the studio, Plucky realizes that he is being used as a stunt duck and quits to resume his previous show. Gag credit: Plucky's cape courtesy of - Siegfried and Roy
85	7	"Toons Take Over"	Byron Vaughns	Peter Hastings	Barry Caldwell, Charles Visser, Ken Mitchroney (as Ken Mitchroney, Jr), Pat Wong (as Patricia Wong), Keith Tucker, Ed Baker, Joey Banaszkiewicz, Brian Mitchell	September 21, 1992	406-193
With Steven absent, Babs is sick to death with comedy. Babs, Buster and Plucky go to speak to Cooper DeVille for a change in their act and they are all appointed directors for their very own cartoons. Unfortunately their jobs prove to be difficult to achieve results, but they finally have a full six-minute motion picture completed. When the time comes to screen the cartoon, Babs puts it on satellite causing a scandal around the globe. Babs, Buster and Plucky then go back to their usual rehearsals. Gag credit: Hey! We lost a paperclip! Whoever took it, give it back right now! - Oh, wait. We found it. Never mind.
86	8	"Toons from the Crypt"	Ken Boyer	Nicholas Hollander, Paul Dini	Joey Banaszkiewicz, Tony Craig, Kaan Kalyon, Brian Mitchell	September 22, 1992 (Australia); November 11, 1995 (Nickelodeon; earliest known date)	406-182
(This episode was not aired by Fox, due to the network censors rejecting the "Night of the Living Pets" segment. It is available on the season 3 DVD and has aired on Hub Network/the Hub.); Wraparounds: Buster introduces scary toons in a tomb in the heart of a mansion. "Wait Till Your Father Gets Even": Hamton loses his father's bottle cap collection in a bet with Plucky and is afraid to face the wrath of his own father. (This segment first aired on The Plucky Duck Show on November 7, 1992.) "Concord the Kindly Condor": Concord grants help to animals in need while his three big brothers think otherwise and try to get him to act more like a condor. "Night of the Living Pets": Every pet that died in Elmyra's care comes from their graves as zombies to haunt Elmyra, scaring her out of her wits—until she begins smothering them with the very same affection that killed them. (Despite being banned by Fox, this segment first appeared on the "Fiendishly Funny Adventures" VHS, released in 1994.); Gag credit: We gave Concord Condor a new haircut - And he still isn't funny.
87	9	"Two-Tone Town"	Ken Boyer	Deanna Oliver	Joe Banaszkiewicz (as Joey Banaszkiewicz), Tony Craig, Brian Mitchell, Lou Police, Tim George	September 28, 1992	406-194
Buster and Babs enter a monochrome town called Two-Tone Town. Babs and Buster are disappointed to learn that the Two-Tone toons (Foxy, his girlfriend, and Goopy Geer) are out of fashion and are losing their business to an Acme agent. Babs decides to train the Two-Tone toons to audition for Acme Oop! while Buster goes to steal some materials. The Two-Tone toons are rejected from the audition, but Buster arrives and manages to renew them, gaining them a place on TV. Gag credit: Quote of the day - "Do you like our butts and ears better up or down?"
88	10	"Buster's Directorial Debut"	Rich Arons	Sherri Stoner, Nicholas Hollander, Peter Hastings	Eddie Fitzgerald, James Fletcher, Enrique May, Rusty Mills	November 2, 1992	406-192
Wraparounds: Buster has been promoted director for today's toon show, but his set for 'Furrball on the Roof' is interrupted. "Fit to Be Stewed": In a parody of Hansel and Gretel, Babs and Buster come across a carrot-cake house inhabited by Witch Sandy who is intent in making a stew out of them and manages to turn Babs into a real rabbit. "Ducklahoma": To get even with Plucky, Buster has him star in "The Anvil Chorus" remixed with "Oklahoma!". Gag credit: Buster's Directorial Debut" Is Also - Buster's Directorial Swan Song
89	11	"Washingtoon"	Alfred Gimeno, David West (co-director)	Nicholas Hollander	Craig Armstrong, Marc Schirmeister, Glenn Vilppu (as Glen Vilppu), Sherilan Weinhart	November 4, 1992	406-195
Buster and Babs find that toon characters are being put out of commission by the ACAFC chairwoman who hates unrealistic comical violence. The chairwoman's actions put Acme Acres at stake with Plucky collaborating. Babs and Buster head off to Washington to seek help from the President, but agreement from politicians is required. After Buster and Babs have a conflict with the chairwoman in the Congress centre they restore the toons and save Acme Acres all together. Gag credit: Guess What We Are?: A. Republicans; B. Democrats; C. As of this broadcast being investigated by the F.B.I.
90	12	"Toon TV"	Rich Arons	Rich Arons, Sherri Stoner, Peter Hastings	Alfred Gimeno, Jim Fletcher (as James Fletcher), Rusty Mills, Enrique May, Eddie Fitzgerald	November 9, 1992	406-180
Another collection of music videos, presented by Buster and Babs in countdown form: "It's in His Kiss": Babs wonders if Buster loves her. "Video Game Blues": Plucky fights space aliens in a video game, to the tune of "Dance of the Sugar Plum Fairy" and "Russian Dance" from The Nutcracker. "Nothing Comes Close to Yul": A brief Sinéad O'Connor parody. "The Name Game": Elmyra sings about the various characters while thwarting space aliens. The credits say Plucky's name was "inadvertently omitted". "Toon Out, Toon In": An original song about the various characters on the show by a rapper named Vanilla Lice. "Do You Love Me?": Buster keeps telling Babs that he loves her. "Yakety Yak": Plucky is ordered by his dad to take out the trash and do the laundry. During this, he is chased by the cops, who are trailing a criminal (who looks like the deranged hitchhiker from Tiny Toon Adventures: How I Spent My Summer Vacation) on the run. Gag credit: Name inadvertently omitted in "The Name Game" - Plucky.
91	13	"Grandma's Dead"	Alfred Gimeno, David West (co-director)	Deanna Oliver	Glenn Vilppu (as Glen Vilppu)	November 10, 1992	406-187
Elmyra freaks out over her hamster dying, but everyone else thinks that she is crying over her grandmother's death. Gag credit: TV Guide said that writer, Deanna Oliver, was "Deliciously Clever" - but that was another episode.
92	14	"Music Day"	Alfred Gimeno, David West (co-director)	Story by : Tom Ruegger; Teleplay by : Sherri Stoner Chris Otsuki and Tom Ruegger Paul Dini	Craig Armstrong, Ken Harsha, Sherilan Weinhart	November 11, 1992	406-191
Wraparounds: The Tiny Toons introduce Music Day in a Proscenium theatre. "Ruffled Ruffee": Buster engages in a battle of wits with an entrancing kids' song musician named Ruffee, who despises loud music. "The Horn Blows at Lunchtime": Li'l Sneezer tries to find a place to practice playing his trumpet, causing an assumed farting commotion in the cafeteria with his lousy playing and Limburger cheese. "Loon Lake": Shirley becomes a ballerina for a recital, but the stuck-up swans think that she is too ditzy to be a dancer. With Babs' encouragement and assistance, Shirley gives it her best shot. Gag credit: Just between us - Letterman should have gotten the Carson gig.
93	15	"The Horror of Slumber Party Mountain"	Greg Reyna	Paul Dini	Eddie Fitzgerald, James Fletcher, Jenny Lerew, Rusty Mills, Tim George	November 12, 1992	406-196
Babs, Fifi and Shirley are staying in Shirley’s house and playing games, when a strange visitor enters. They suspect Plucky, Hamton and Buster are up to no good. Sure enough the three boys are camping not too far. After Buster tells the Legend of One-Eyed Jack, the girls scare them away. The real One-Eyed Jack appears. While Fifi holds him off, Babs and Shirley enter the nearby mansion. Buster, Plucky and Hamton have also taken hiding inside. One-by-one the friends disappear until they're imprisoned in the dungeon. The monster is none other than Elmyra. The title is a possible reference to The Ghost of Slumber Mountain. However, the episode itself appears to be a spoof of slasher movies. Gag credit: Elmyra's Wardrobe By - Miss Take.
94	16	"Sports Shorts"	Alfred Gimeno, David West (co-director)	Tom Ruegger, Peter Hastings	Glen Vilppu and Sherilan Weinhart	November 13, 1992	406-183
Wraparounds: Buster and Babs brief the sports activities in Acme Acres. "Minister Golf": Plucky enjoyed miniature golf ever since he was a duckling. He had difficulty with his golf swings but soon became good. This is a follow-up to the segment "The Potty Years" from episode 406-174. "The Undersea World of Fifi": Fifi is running an expedition across the ocean to find sea monkeys. Elmyra has been picked to dive for them. After a long walk on the seabed, she finds their hideout. Elmyra's attempts to catch a sea monkey ruin Fifi's expedition and ultimately brings the universe to the Apocalypse. Gag credit: Appearing as Sea Monkeys - Brine Shrimp; Recipe for "Brine Shrimp La Fume" - 8,000 Tsp. Brine Shrimp 1 Clove Garlic, 1/2 lb. Butter Boil Brine Shrimp until screaming. Mix with other ingredients and beat into hysteria. Serve on a tennis court.
95	17	"Weekday Afternoon Live"	Rich Arons	Peter Hastings, Deanna Oliver, Paul Dini	Jim Fletcher (as James Fletcher), Rusty Mills, Enrique May, Eddie Fitzgerald	November 16, 1992	406-188
A parody of the NBC sketch show Saturday Night Live, hosted by a Bart Simpson lookalike and featuring parodies of the show's popular recurring characters and bits. Gag credit: We thought this would be funny - But Nooooooo!
96	18	"A Cat's Eye View"	Byron Vaughns	Paul Dini Story by : Sherri Stoner; Teleplay by : George McGrath Story by : Tom Ruegger; Teleplay by : Nicholas Hollander and Sherri Stoner	Barry Caldwell, Thomas Ellery, Kenneth Harsha, Swinton Scott, Charles Visser, Patricia Wong	November 17, 1992	406-176
Wraparounds: Elmyra attempts to recapture Furrball. "Little Dog Lost": Tired of Elmyra's abuse, Byron runs away into the care of an attractive lady. At first Byron tries to ensure his stay, but he goes back to Elmyra, realising how much she loves him. "Party Crasher Plucky": Plucky convinces Shirley to let him come with her to a celebrity party, but keeps getting kicked out. "Homeward Bound": Furrball is miserable, having no place to go. He manages to enter a rich couple and their daughter's apartment inhabited by a cat couple and their kitten, but he is unwanted and in the end sticks around with a poor couple and their son. Gag credit: Sherri Stoner's favorite gag - That John Candied-Yam bit.
97	19	"Best of Buster Day"	Rich Arons	Charlie Adler, Garin Wolf, Paul Dini	Flamarion Ferreira, Eddie Fitzgerald, James Fletcher, Rusty Mills	November 23, 1992	406-175
Wraparounds: Buster is in trouble with Bugs for lack of results. "Compromising Principals": Vice-Principal Yosemite Sam is trying to get a new job at a different school. Buster is worried that with Sam gone, the students will not be able to get away with as much, so he plots to sabotage Sam's chances. "Maid to Re-Order": Montana Max sacks the Grovely family (including his maid and butler) and the family stays in Buster's home. Buster sorts out the situation by making Monty want Grovely back. "Class Without Class": Buster and Dizzy have no desire to be enemies as their tutors demand, but their rivalry goes on until they can stand it no longer. Gag credit: Hey, we won an Emmy! - But not for this episode.
98	20	"It's a Wonderful Tiny Toons Christmas Special"	Jon McClenahan; Michael Gerard, Byron Vaughns and Rich Arons (additionals)	Sherri Stoner, Deanna Oliver	Mike Gerard, Byron Vaughns, Neal Sternecky, Kathy Carr; Ed Baker and Tony Craig (additionals)	December 6, 1992	406-098
Acme Acres has a problem since Buster Bunny is considering quitting Tiny Toons. It started after Buster began a special being audienced by TV executives. Because he was excluded from the show for being late, Montana Max sabotaged Buster's efforts, made him look a failure and replaced him for the star of the Tiny Toons show. Before Buster can throw himself out of the picture, his guardian toon angel shows him the consequences of the TV show if he never was the star in the first place. Buster changes his mind and takes back his place as the star. This special episode is a spoof of RKO Pictures' 1946 holiday classic It's a Wonderful Life. Gag credit: Stop watching these credits - And go buy us a really nice gift!

=== Specials (1994–95) ===
No.	Title	Directed by	Written by	Storyboard by	Release date (U.S.)	Prod. code	Viewers (millions)
99	"Tiny Toons Spring Break"	Rich Arons, Michael Gerard, Dave Marshall	Peter Hastings, Nicholas Hollander, Tom Ruegger	Rich Arons, Joey Banaszkiewicz, Christopher Dent, Ken Harsha, Liz Holzman, Brian Mitchell, Ryan Roberts, Carolyn Gair-Taylor, Charles Visser, Al Zegler	March 27, 1994 (Fox)	406-094	7.7
The Tiny Toons are going on a trip to Florida, while Elmyra has a mission to capture Buster with Operation: Easter Bunny, recruiting a police commissioner to help her. The Tiny Toons are staying at a cheap motel, while Hamton and Plucky are staying with Hamton's grandparents. Plucky plans to make his Tanmeister 6000 successfully on a TV commercial and falls in love with a girl. Elmyra chases Buster until he tricks her into thinking an orca is the Easter Bunny. The Tiny Toons finish their holiday for a night at the beach. Features non-speaking cameos from Pinky and the Brain and the Warner siblings from Animaniacs.
100	"Tiny Toons' Night Ghoulery"	Michael Gerard, Rusty Mills, Rich Arons, Greg Reyna	Peter Hastings, Paul Dini, Paul Rugg, Rich Arons	Rich Arons, Joey Banaszkiewicz, Paul Fisher, Carolyn Gair-Taylor, Michael Gerard, Alfred Gimeno, Ken Harsha, Liz Holzman, Rusty Mills, Phillip Mosness, John Over, Ryan Roberts, Charles Visser, Al Zegler	May 28, 1995 (Fox)	406-093	3.7
A one-hour special parodying various Halloween movies and stories by parodying Night Gallery. "Introduction": A parody of The Nightmare Before Christmas number "Jack's Lament" starring Pumpkin Guy. "The Tell-Tale Vacuum": Plucky expresses a phobia towards Hamton's vacuum cleaner and proceeds to destroy it, deeply regretting it afterwards. A parody of "The Tell-Tale Heart". "Sneezer the Sneezing Ghost": Witch Hazel demands Furrball to catch the Sneezing Ghost, but Furrball liquidates himself. A parody of Casper the Friendly Ghost. "Demon Dog on the Moors": The locals on the moors are scared by the presence of the Demon Dog, which Babs has never heard of. A parody of An American Werewolf in London. "Fuel": Calamity repeatedly gets run over by a fuel truck, driven by Little Beeper. A parody of Duel. "The Devil and Daniel Webfoot": Daniel Webfoot heads to Montana Max's mansion to confront Satan and bring judgement to Monty, but his plan backfires. A parody of "The Devil and Daniel Webster". "Hold That Duck": Plucky and Buster head to Horsehead Manor, a mansion that Plucky inherited from his Uncle Mortimer. Plucky keeps seeing nasty creatures, while Buster notices nothing. A parody of the Abbott and Costello films Hold That Ghost and Abbott and Costello Meet Frankenstein. "Night of the Living Dull": The Wackyland gang is pursued by dealers and advertisers. A parody of Night of the Living Dead. "Frankenmyra & Dizzigor": Frankenmyra has brought the materials to create her very own cuddly pet. She activates the abomination, which makes a pet out of Frankenmyra in her style. A parody of Frankenstein. "A Gremlin on a Wing": During a flight, Plucky spots a gremlin sabotaging the plane's wing and engine and barely manages to prevent the plane getting destroyed. A parody of Star Trek, Twilight Zone: The Movie, and The Twilight Zone episode "Nightmare at 20,000 Feet". The Brain from Animaniacs and Pinky and the Brain makes a cameo guest appearance.
