= The Rainbow (magazine) =

1981–1993 computer magazine

- June 1984 issue
- Editor: Lawrence C. Falk
- Categories: Computer magazines
- Frequency: Monthly
- First issue: July 1981
- Final issue: May 1993
- Company: Falsoft
- Country: United States
- Based in: Prospect, Kentucky
- Language: English
- ISSN: 0746-4797

The Rainbow was an American monthly magazine dedicated to the TRS-80 Color Computer, a home computer made by Tandy Corporation (now RadioShack). It was started by Lawrence C. Falk(commonly known as Lonnie Falk) and was published from July 1981 to May 1993 by Falk's company, Falsoft, which was based in Prospect, Kentucky.

== History ==
The first issue of the magazine was two double-sided sheets containing text printed on a Radio Shack Line Printer VII printer. Falk photocopied 25 of the debut issue, and sold them for $1.00. After the first batch sold out, he made ten more copies. The magazine's "...articles, comments, tips, and program listings..." were good enough to attract advertisements from The Micro Works and JARB Software by the release of the third issue. JARB Software (and Joe Bennett in particular) became a contributor of many software and hardware articles in early issues of The Rainbow. Beginning with the first anniversary issue, the magazine was professionally typeset and had full color covers. The December 1982 issue was the first to use perfect binding. The magazine operations moved into a commercial space in early 1983 after having started in an extra room in Falk's home, then to this home's renovated basement.

In 1983, The Rainbow started a series of CoCo conventions under the name Rainbowfest.

Lonnie Falk was elected mayor of Prospect in November 1993 and was continued in office until his death in June 2006 at age 63 of a heart attack.

== Content ==
The magazine featured articles, columns, reviews, tutorials, letters from readers, and advertisements. Many articles presented BASIC or assembly language program listings. Readers had to type these programs in by hand, unless they ordered a cassette or diskette containing these programs, through the Rainbow on Tape or Rainbow on Disk service. The BASIC programs were printed in a fixed font with 32 characters per line so that they would show up just as they did on the CoCo's standard 32×16 text screen.

The magazine provided a small program called Rainbow Check Plus which helped users type in the listings accurately. The program would count the number and values of characters which the user typed in. A small box accompanying a program listing would serve as a checksum system. It was a two-column table that specified what checksum value was expected for a few chosen lines in the program. For example, after line 140, the checksum was expected to be 149, then after line 290, it was expected to be 21, etc. This system required the user to type the listing exactly as it appeared, including all spaces and possible typographical errors. Some users preferred to edit and improve the program as they typed it, at the risk of making hard-to-find mistakes.

The publication's style was informal. It was mostly geared towards beginners and hobbyists. Articles were often accompanied by colorful illustrations, and so was each month's cover. There was also a comic strip whose main character was called the CoCo Cat.

Lonnie Falk wrote a monthly editorial titled PRINT#-2, (with a comma at the end of the title, because it was part of the syntax of the CoCo BASIC's PRINT command when targeting the printer).

The advertisements came from some large companies like Tandy but mostly from small software and hardware vendors. While Tandy would have full-page color ads, the small vendors' ads would be smaller and much more modest in style. This reflected the fact that it was relatively easier at the time to start a business in the computer field. The barrier to entry in today's computer industry is arguably higher.

Software and hardware reviews appeared in each issue. The Rainbow Certification Seal was attributed to a product to certify that it had been seen by the Rainbow staff and that it did exist. It was not however a guarantee of satisfaction since it did not say anything about the quality of the product. The reviews were supposed to fill that role. The certification program started in The Rainbow's second year.

The magazine had a department called the Rainbow Scorecard which registered high scores achieved by readers playing CoCo video games.

Each issue of the magazine had a theme that was typically associated with the calendar month. The December issue was the Holiday issue, while the January issue was the Beginners issue and was meant as an introduction to the CoCo world for readers who had received a Color Computer for Christmas. August was the Games issue, September was Education, November was Telecommunications, and July was the Anniversary issue.

== Contributing columnists ==
- William Barden, Jr. (Barden's Buffer): technical articles often involving low-level assembly language programming;
- Joe Bennett of JARB Software & one third of the infamous trio that started the Rainbow Magazine idea: programs, how-to articles, and technical tips in the early years of the Rainbow;
- Tony DiStefano (Turn of the Screw): hardware projects;
- Joseph Kolar (BASIC Training): tutorials on BASIC language programming;
- Cray Augsburg (Delphi Bureau): coverage of the CoCo community on the Delphi online service;
- Fred B. Scerbo (Wishing Well): BASIC programs based on ideas submitted by readers;
- Dale L. Puckett (KISSable OS-9): coverage of the OS-9 multitasking operating system;
- Steve Blyn (Education Notes): coverage of educational software;
- Marty Goodman (CoCo Consultations), Richard E. Esposito (Doctor ASCII), Dan Downard (Downloads), Ed Ellers (Earth to Ed): answers to technical questions from the readers;
- Dennis Lewandowski (The Assembly Corner): assembly language programming;
- Charles J. Roslund (Charlie's Machine): a machine language utility column;
- Michael Plog, Ph.D. (Education Overview): addressing issues of using computers and technology within educational settings;
- William Nolan of Prickly Pear Software (The Dragon's Byte): wrote dozens of articles and, for several years, a monthly column on gaming, particularly fantasy gaming, on the CoCo.
- Tom Nelson (CoCo Counsel): law and computers.
- Daniel Adams Eastham (Personable Pascal):
