= Gangbusters (1988 video game) =

1988 video game

- Arcade flyer
- Developer: Konami
- Publisher: Konami
- Platform: Arcade
- Release: JP: August 1988; EU: 1988
- Genre: Run and gun
- Modes: Single-player, multiplayer

Gangbusters, released in Japan as Crazy Cop (Note: Japanese: クレイジーコップ, Hepburn: Kureijī Koppu), is a 1988 run and gun video game developed and published by Konami for arcades. It was released in Japan in August 1988 and Europe the same year. Hamster Corporation released the game as part of their Arcade Archives series for the Nintendo Switch and PlayStation 4 in April 2025.

== Gameplay ==
The player controls two detectives, Smith and Wesson, as they capture the Dagrus mob and defeat the Red Gang after a bank robbery. The player must shoot their way across levels while arresting criminals that when held, grant power-ups to the player; points are granted and the power-ups are kept after they are brought to the police car, but they can be released if the player is hit. The player is extremely fragile and must avoid frequent showers of bullets while progressing levels, which end when the player defeats all enemies in a level. The game ends when all players lose their lives or reach the bank vault after stopping every enemy in every level.
