= Crimebuster =

Crimebuster or crime busters or variation, may refer to:

== Comics ==
- Crimebuster (Boy Comics), alter-ego of Chuck Chandler, fictional boy hero of the 1940s-1950s
- Crimebuster (Marvel Comics)
- Crimebusters (DC Comics), a short-lived team appearing in Watchmen

== Films ==
- The Crimebusters, a 1961 crime film
- Crimebusters (film), a 1976 crime film
- Crime Busters, a 1977 action-comedy film
- Crimebuster: A Son's Search for His Father (2012 film) award-winning documentary film by Lou Dematteis

== Television ==
- Crime Buster (television series), 1968 UK television series
- "Crimebusters" (1989 TV episode), season 4 number 12 episode 62 of Perfect Strangers
- "Crimebusters" (1992 TV episode), season 5 number 2 episode 56 of ChuckleVision
- "Crimebusters" (2009 TV episode), season 19 number 13 episode 434 of Law & Order,

== Other uses ==
- "CRIME BUSTER", cover art for the Evil Empire (1996) album cover
- Crimebusters, fictional characters from Mighty Mouse: The New Adventures
- Crimebusters FC, a soccer team from Eugu, Nigeria; from the Nigeria Nationwide League
- The American series of The Three Investigators#Crimebusters (1989–1990)
- Crime Buster, a light-gun shooter released by Atari Corporation for the Atari XEGS in 1988

== See also ==
- Crime Busters x 2, a 2008 Singaporean Chinese drama
- Crimebusters + Crossed Wires: Stories from This American Life, a compilation album
- Buster (disambiguation)
- Crime (disambiguation)
- Law enforcement
