= Lady, Play Your Mandolin! =

1931 film

- Title card
- Directed by: Rudolf Ising
- Produced by: Hugh Harman; Rudolf Ising; Leon Schlesinger
- Starring: Rudolf Ising; Rochelle Hudson; Abe Lyman (all uncredited)
- Music by: Frank Marsales
- Animation by: Rollin Hamilton; Norm Blackburn
- Color process: Black and white
- Production companies: Harman-Ising Productions; Leon Schlesinger Productions
- Distributed by: Warner Bros. Pictures; The Vitaphone Corporation
- Release date: June 13, 1931; (earliest known date)
- Running time: 7:14
- Country: United States
- Language: English

Lady, Play Your Mandolin! is a 1931 American animated musical comedy film. It is the first film in the Merrie Melodies series, and stars Foxy, a character who appeared in three 1931 shorts. It was released as early as June 13, 1931. (Note: Archived from a June 16 article, this is based on the fact that new cartoon shorts would premiere in theaters on Saturdays.) It was directed by Rudolf Ising.

== Overview ==
Full short in restored form

A Prohibition-era saloon is disguised as a café, with its customers drunkenly enjoying their time. Foxy the gaucho rides off at night to the saloon, celebrated by its customers before paying for a beer. He watches Roxy perform a song on the mandolin, demanding her to play for him. Meanwhile, Foxy's horse unties itself from a cactus and attempts to enter, only to be hit by Foxy with a bottle of booze. It drunkenly reenters the saloon and impresses the customers, before hallucinating upon seeing itself on a mirror. It lights itself on fire and burns its fur away as Foxy and the customers sing with him.

== Production ==
As was typically the case with the early entries in the Merrie Melodies series, one purpose of the cartoon was to promote a Warner-owned popular song. The title theme, written by Oscar Levant with lyrics by Irving Caesar, was a 1930 #5 pop hit sung by Nick Lucas and released by Brunswick Records, which had been purchased by Warner Bros. the previous year (Another recording, by the Havana Novelty Orchestra was released the same year on RCA's Victor Records). In the short, it is sung by a female fox character who would later become Foxy's girlfriend, Roxy.

The credited animators were Rollin "Ham" Hamilton and Norm Blackburn, plus uncredited animation by Isadore Freleng, Robert Clampett (his first cartoon at WB according to some sources), and Carman Maxwell with a musical score and direction of the Abe Lyman (Brunswick Recording) Orchestra by Frank Marsales. Rudolf Ising provides the voice of Foxy, while Harman-Ising regular Rochelle Hudson as well as Abe Lyman (and probably members of his band) provide the other voices.

The film was said to have not been available since its original theatrical release for a long time. There are also no copyright registration or renewal records for the film, resulting in it being in the public domain.

== Home media ==
Lady, Play Your Mandolin! was released on disc 1 of the Looney Tunes Collector's Vault: Volume 3 Blu-ray set.
