= Frank Marsales =

Canadian television composer

Frank Alfred Marsales
- Born: August 31, 1886; Yonker, Saskatchewan
- Died: August 14, 1975 (aged 88); Long Beach, California

Frank Alfred Marsales (August 31, 1886 – August 14, 1975) was a Canadian composer best known for his work scoring cartoons by Harman-Ising Productions in the 1930s. He also worked with Walter Lantz Productions in the mid to late 1930s.

== Cartoon career ==
Having immigrated to the United States for a career as a musician, Marsales was hired by animators Hugh Harman and Rudolf Ising to score their Looney Tunes and Merrie Melodies series for Warner Bros. Pictures. His first credit was for Sinkin' in the Bathtub, released in May 1930 and animated by Friz Freleng. He composed the music to the 1931 Merrie Melody Lady, Play Your Mandolin!. His last credit for Warner Bros. was in 1933 with Bosko's Picture Show. He left the studio after Harman and Ising terminated their contract with producer Leon Schlesinger. Marsales may also have had a hand injury at that time that precluded his composing any music at all.

In the mid-1930s, Marsales began work at Walter Lantz Productions as musical director for the Andy Panda cartoons, among others. Marsales's last credited musical score at Walter Lantz Studios was for Knock Knock, released on November 25, 1940 (although he may also have scored some parts of Syncopated Sioux, released December 30, 1940, which the musical director was uncredited). Music from Marsales's work for Lantz also found its way into the 1957 animated television series The Woody Woodpecker Show, which contained not only new cartoons, but also Woody's (and other) theatrical Lantz cartoons from the previous twenty years.

== Personal life ==
Marsales was born in Yonker, Saskatchewan, Canada, on August 31, 1886, the son of Robert Lambert Marsales and Lena Burns. He lived most of his life in California. Marsales married Catherine Elizabeth Murset (April 30,1889 – January 13, 1971). They had no children. He died on August 14, 1975 in Long Beach, California.
