= The Golden Age of Looney Tunes =

Video series compiling Warner Bros. animated short films

Cover for the collection's LaserDisc box sets

The Golden Age of Looney Tunes is a collection of LaserDiscs released by MGM/UA Home Video in the 1990s. There were five sets made, featuring a number of discs, and each disc side represented a different theme, being made up of seven cartoons per side. The first volume was also released on VHS, with each tape representing one disc side.

Like many other Looney Tunes home video releases by MGM/UA Home Video, Volumes 1-4 used faded 35 mm Associated Artists Productions (a.a.p.) television prints as MGM/UA and Turner Entertainment Co., owners of the rights to the shorts, at the time had no access to the original film negatives held by Warner Bros. Pictures. Unlike many other Looney Tunes home video releases by MGM/UA Home Video, most of the a.a.p. logos were cut from the releases due to their intrusive nature and wasting storage normally free on other home releases.

As Volume 5 was released in 1997, however, newer "remasters" were used that Turner Entertainment Co. had created in 1995, known as Turner "dubbed versions", to make the shorts look more presentable for television and home video releases. These shorts had an altered ending card taken from one of the shorts with the disclaimer to Turner Entertainment Co. below. Turner did not have access to Warner Bros.' negatives, so only what was provided from a.a.p. could be used, hence why some of the Turner prints are of varying quality. Warner Bros. would follow the collection with superior masters from their own negatives after acquiring Turner.

With the exception of the "Censored Eleven" shorts, every Looney Tunes and Merrie Melodies short in the a.a.p./Turner library was released in this collection.

== Volume 1 ==
The first volume of the set, The Golden Age of Looney Tunes was released on December 11, 1991 on LaserDisc. Due to potentially offensive material in the cartoon Bugs Bunny Nips the Nips coming under fire in February 1995, later reprints were released with that short replaced by Racketeer Rabbit, which was also released on Volume 3. The first volume contains 70 animated shorts from 1931 through 1948 (1933–1948 on the cover). Each side of the first volume's discs contains animated shorts fitting a particular theme or category - this arrangement is used in all five volumes of The Golden Age of Looney Tunes. Each side was also released on VHS as ten separate volumes.

- Side 1, 1930s Musicals, featured several early entries in the Merrie Melodies series. Music played an integral part in each cartoon on this side. Including Tex Avery's I Love to Singa.
- Side 2, Firsts, featured debut cartoons for several major characters. One featured cartoon, Daffy Duck & Egghead, technically, was the first Daffy Duck cartoon in color, and the first where the character actually has that name. This was used because Turner did not own the rights to Porky's Duck Hunt, Daffy's actual debut. This copy of Daffy Duck & Egghead uses the Blue Ribbon titles but leaves the original end cue intact.
- Sides 3 through 6 were each dedicated to cartoons from one of the following directors: Tex Avery (side 3), Bob Clampett (side 4), Chuck Jones (side 5) and Friz Freleng (side 6)
- Side 7, Bugs Bunny by Each Director, was one of two Bugs-centric sides on the first volume. It featured at least one Bugs Bunny cartoon from each director that did at least one between 1940 through July 1948. Tex Avery, Bob Clampett, Chuck Jones, Robert McKimson and Frank Tashlin each directed one entry, while Friz Freleng directed two.
- Side 8, 1940s Zanies, featured several character-driven cartoons from the 1940s.
- Side 9, Hooray For Hollywood, was dedicated to cartoons in which show-business itself played a major part. Many cartoons on this side featured caricatures of notable celebrities of the time.
- Side 10, The Art of Bugs, was the other Bugs-centric side on the first volume. All three Cecil Turtle encounters are on this side, as are the debuts of Beaky Buzzard and Marvin the Martian. Another notable cartoon is The Old Grey Hare, which is famous for its end gag involving the title card.

Notes: This set also contains the original ending audio of Daffy Duck and Egghead, Speaking Of The Weather, Swooner Crooner and Have You Got Any Castles?

== Volume 2 ==
The Golden Age of Looney Tunes: Vol. 2 was released on July 1, 1992 on laserdisc. The second volume contains 70 animated shorts from 1931 through 1948. The second volume's categories are as follows:

- Side 1, Musical Madness, features several musical cartoons from the 1930s, including several Harman and Ising-era cartoons, and two early color entries (before the switch to three-strip Technicolor).
- Side 2, Early Wabbits, features all the color cartoons starring the Bugs Bunny prototype, and some early cartoons with Bugs himself.
- Sides 3 through 6 are again dedicated to cartoons from a single (or in one case, a pair of) director(s), in the following order: Frank Tashlin, Chuck Jones, Bob Clampett and McKimson/Davis
- Side 7, Fables & Fairy Tales, featured cartoons which parodied famous fairy tales.
- Side 8, The Art of Daffy, is dedicated to Daffy Duck. All four color Looney Tunes released in 1943 are on this side.
- Side 9, Best Supporting Players, featured cartoons starring several lesser-known characters
- Side 10, Variations on a Theme, was centered on sleep.

== Volume 3 ==
The Golden Age of Looney Tunes: Vol. 3 was released on December 23, 1992 on laserdisc. The third volume contains 70 animated shorts from 1931 through 1948. The third volume's categories are as follows:

- Side 1, Harman-Ising, exclusively featuring cartoons from the era their studio produced both series.
- Side 2, Bugs Bunny, features cartoons starring the titular character
- Sides 3 through 6, as with previous volumes, are each dedicated to cartoons from a particular director, in the following order: Chuck Jones, Friz Freleng, Tex Avery, Frank Tashlin/BobClampett
- Side 7, Sports, featured cartoons dealing with the world of sport
- Side 8, The Evolution of Egghead, covers the evolution of Egghead into Elmer Fudd
- Side 9, Porky and Daffy, featured cartoons starring either character (with one pairing)
- Side 10, Politically Incorrect, had cartoons that featured stereotypes of Africans or Native Americans

== Volume 4 ==
The Golden Age of Looney Tunes: Vol. 4 was released on July 14, 1993 on laserdisc. The fourth volume contains 73 animated shorts from 1932 through 1948. The fourth volume's categories are as follows:

- Side 1, Bugs Bunny, was dedicated to the titular rabbit
- Side 2, Early Chuck Jones, featured early entries from that director
- Side 3, Friz Freleng, featured cartoons from that director
- Side 4, Cartoon All-Stars, had several character-driven cartoons and two one-shots
- Side 5, Radio Daze, featured cartoons centered on old-time radio or its stars
- Side 6, Frantic Forties, featured several one-shots from the 1940s
- Side 7, Wacky Blackouts, featured cartoons centered on sight gags
- Side 8, Ben Hardaway & Cal Dalton (and Private Snafu), featured cartoons from the Hardaway-Dalton team along with three Private Snafu cartoons
- Side 9, Sniffles, was dedicated to the titular mouse
- Side 10, Merrie Melodies, featured several early entries in that series.

== Volume 5 ==
The Golden Age of Looney Tunes: Vol. 5 was released on April 2, 1997 on laserdisc. The fifth volume contains 55 animated shorts from 1932 through 1949. The fifth volume came out over three and a half years after The Golden Age of Looney Tunes: Vol. 4 was released - by this point, Turner had been bought out by Time Warner. A majority of the shorts in this volume use the newer American 1995 Turner "dubbed" prints, except for The Merry Old Soul, which has its original Associated Artists Productions print complete with the a.a.p. titles. Side 1 and Side 8 do not have Turner prints.

The final box set in the series contains bonus material such as an alternate version of Hare Ribbin' and two live-action film segments with cameos by Bugs Bunny: My Dream Is Yours and Two Guys from Texas. The set also includes three World War II-era cartoon shorts featuring the sailor Hook that were made specially for the U.S. Armed Forces. The shorts are The Good Egg (not to be confused with the regular Warner Bros. short with the same name), The Return of Mr. Hook and Tokyo Woes. The fifth volume's categories are as follows:

- Side 1, Black and White Classics, features several cartoons from the Harman-Ising era
- Side 2, Early Avery, features early cartoons from Tex Avery
- Side 3, Freleng Follies, has a number of cartoons from Friz Freleng
- Side 4, Musical Madness, has several musical cartoons from the 1930s
- Side 5, Pesky Pets, features cartoons centered on animals normally kept as pets, including several Curious Puppies cartoons
- Side 6, Objects d'Art, features "objects come to life" cartoons
- Side 7, Animal Antics, features cartoons driven by all-animal casts
- Side 8, Supplement Material, features the bonus content

== Available shorts ==
This is a listing of the shorts in the Warner Bros.' Looney Tunes and Merrie Melodies series (as well as six non-Looney Tunes/Merrie Melodies shorts) available on The Golden Age of Looney Tunes set. See the Looney Tunes and Merrie Melodies filmography for a more detailed list of all the shorts. All films before Honeymoon Hotel are in black-and-white. Unless otherwise noted, all other cartoons are in three-strip Technicolor.

Key

- = Looney Tunes
- = Merrie Melodies
- = was reissued as a Blue Ribbon Merrie Melodies short
- NT = Non-theatrical shorts
- X:Y = Volume X, Side Y
- * = Public domain
- Cine = Cinecolor
- Techni = Technicolor
1. Smile, Darn Ya, Smile!* (Ising/Sep 5/1:1) - 1931
2. One More Time* (Ising/Oct 3/3:1) - 1931
3. You Don't Know What You're Doin'!* (Ising/Oct 31/2:1) - 1931
4. Red-Headed Baby* (Ising/Dec 26/3:1) - 1931
5. Pagan Moon* (Ising/Jan 23/3:1) - 1932
6. Freddy the Freshman* (Ising/Feb 20/3:7) - 1932
7. Crosby, Columbo, and Vallee* (Ising/Mar 19/4:5) - 1932
8. Goopy Geer* (Ising/Apr 16/2:1) - 1932
9. It's Got Me Again!* (Ising/May 14/5:1) - 1932
10. Moonlight for Two* (Ising/Jun 11/5:1) - 1932
11. The Queen Was in the Parlor* (Ising/Jul 9/4:10) - 1932
12. I Love a Parade* (Ising/Aug 6/4:10) - 1932
13. You're Too Careless with Your Kisses!* (Ising/Sep 10/5:1) - 1932
14. I Wish I Had Wings* (Ising/Oct 15/5:1) - 1932
15. A Great Big Bunch of You* (Ising/Nov 12/3:1,5:1) - 1932
16. Three's a Crowd* (Ising/Dec 10/2:1) - 1932
17. The Shanty Where Santy Claus Lives* (Ising/Jan 7/3:1) - 1933
18. One Step Ahead of My Shadow (Ising/Feb 4/3:1) - 1933
19. Young and Healthy (Ising/Mar 4/5:1) - 1933
20. The Organ Grinder (Ising/Apr 8/4:10) - 1933
21. Wake Up the Gypsy in Me (Ising/May 13/3:10) - 1933
22. I Like Mountain Music (Ising/Jun 10/5:1) - 1933
23. Shuffle Off to Buffalo (Ising and Freleng/Jul 8/1:1) - 1933
24. The Dish Ran Away With the Spoon (Ising/Aug 5/3:1) - 1933
25. We're in the Money (Ising/Aug 26/2:1) - 1933
26. Honeymoon Hotel (Duvall/Feb 17/2:1/Cine) - 1934
27. Beauty and the Beast (Freleng/Apr 14/2:7/Cine) - 1934
28. Those Beautiful Dames (Freleng/Nov 10/5:6/2-strip Techni) - 1934
29. Pop Goes Your Heart (Freleng/Dec 8/5:7/2-strip Techni) - 1934
30. Mr. and Mrs. Is the Name (Freleng/Jan 19/5:4/2-strip Techni) - 1935
31. Country Boy (Freleng/Feb 9/5:5/2-strip Techni) - 1935
32. I Haven't Got a Hat (Freleng/Mar 2/1:2/2-strip Techni) - 1935
33. Along Flirtation Walk (Freleng/Apr 6/3:7/2-strip Techni) - 1935
34. My Green Fedora (Freleng/Apr 6/5:6/2-strip Techni) - 1935
35. Into Your Dance (Freleng/Jun 8/5:4/2-strip Techni) - 1935
36. The Country Mouse (Freleng/Jul 13/5:4/2-strip Techni) - 1935
37. The Merry Old Soul (Freleng/Aug 17/5:4/2-strip Techni) - 1935
38. The Lady in Red (Freleng/Sep 7/2:1/2-strip Techni) - 1935
39. The Little Dutch Plate (Freleng/Oct 19/5:6/2-strip Techni) - 1935
40. Billboard Frolics (Freleng/Nov 9/4:10/2-strip Techni) - 1935
41. Flowers for Madame (Freleng/Nov 30/4:10/2-strip Techni) - 1935
42. I Wanna Play House (Freleng/Jan 11/5:7) - 1936
43. The Cat Came Back (Freleng/Feb 8/5:5/2-strip Techni) - 1936
44. Miss Glory (Avery/Mar 7/1:1) - 1936
45. I'm a Big Shot Now (Freleng/Apr 11/5:7) - 1936
46. Let It Be Me (Freleng/May 9/4:5) - 1936
47. I'd Love to Take Orders From You (Avery/May 16/5:6) - 1936
48. Bingo Crosbyana (Freleng/May 30/5:4) - 1936
49. When I Yoo Hoo (Freleng/Jun 27/5:7) - 1936
50. I Love to Singa (Avery/Jul 18/1:1) - 1936
51. At Your Service Madame (Freleng/Aug 29/5:7) - 1936
52. Toy Town Hall (Freleng/Sep 19/5:6) - 1936
53. Boulevardier from the Bronx (Freleng/Oct 10/3:7) - 1936
54. Don't Look Now (Avery/Nov 7/5:2) - 1936
55. The Coo-Coo Nut Grove (Freleng/Nov 28/1:9) - 1936
56. He Was Her Man (Freleng/Jan 2/3:10) - 1937
57. Pigs Is Pigs (Freleng/Jan 30/3:4) - 1937
58. I Only Have Eyes for You (Avery/Mar 6/5:2) - 1937
59. The Fella with a Fiddle (Freleng/Mar 27/5:4) - 1937
60. She Was an Acrobat's Daughter (Freleng/Apr 10/5:3) - 1937
61. Ain't We Got Fun (Avery/May 1/5:2) - 1937
62. Streamlined Greta Green (Freleng/Jun 19/5:6) - 1937
63. Sweet Sioux (Freleng/Jul 3/5:3) - 1937
64. Egghead Rides Again (Avery/Jul 17/3:8) - 1937
65. Plenty of Money and You (Freleng/Jul 31/5:7) - 1937
66. A Sunbonnet Blue (Avery/Aug 21/5:2) - 1937
67. Speaking of the Weather (Tashlin/Sep 4/1:1) - 1937
68. Dog Daze (Freleng/Sep 18/5:5) - 1937
69. I Wanna Be a Sailor* (Avery/Sep 25/3:5) - 1937
70. The Lyin' Mouse (Freleng/Oct 16/5:3) - 1937
71. Little Red Walking Hood (Avery/Nov 6/2:7) - 1937
72. The Woods Are Full of Cuckoos (Tashlin/Dec 4/4:5) - 1937
73. September in the Rain (Freleng/Dec 18/4:10) - 1937
74. Daffy Duck & Egghead (Avery/Jan 1/1:2) - 1938
75. My Little Buckaroo (Freleng/Jan 29/5:3) - 1938
76. The Sneezing Weasel (Avery/Mar 12/5:2) - 1938
77. A Star is Hatched (Freleng/Apr 2/5:7) - 1938
78. The Penguin Parade (Avery/Apr 23/2:1) - 1938
79. Now That Summer is Gone (Tashlin/May 14/5:4) - 1938
80. Katnip Kollege (Dalton and Howard/Jun 11/1:1) - 1938
81. Have You Got Any Castles?* (Tashlin/Jun 25/1:1) - 1938
82. Love and Curses (Hardaway and Dalton/Jul 9/4:8) - 1938
83. Cinderella Meets Fella (Avery/Jul 23/1:3) - 1938
84. The Major Lied 'Til Dawn (Tashlin/Aug 13/2:3) - 1938
85. A-Lad-in Bagdad (Dalton and Howard/Aug 27/2:7) - 1938
86. Cracked Ice (Tashlin/Sep 10/2:3) - 1938
87. A Feud There Was (Avery/Sep 24/3:8) - 1938
88. Little Pancho Vanilla (Tashlin/Oct 8/3:6) - 1938
89. Johnny Smith and Poker-Huntas (Avery/Oct 22/3:8) - 1938
90. You're an Education (Tashlin/Nov 5/4:10) - 1938
91. The Night Watchman (Jones/Nov 19/1:5) - 1938
92. Daffy Duck in Hollywood (Avery/Dec 12/1:9) - 1938
93. Count Me Out (Hardaway and Dalton/Dec 17/3:8) - 1938
94. The Mice Will Play (Avery/Dec 31/5:2) - 1938
95. Dog Gone Modern (Jones/Jan 14/5:5) - 1939
96. Hamateur Night* (Avery/Jan 28/1:3) - 1939
97. Robin Hood Makes Good* (Jones/Feb 11/2:7) - 1939
98. Gold Rush Daze* (Hardaway and Dalton/Feb 25/4:8) - 1939
99. A Day at the Zoo* (Avery/Mar 11/3:8) - 1939
100. Prest-O Change-O* (Jones/Mar 25/2:2) - 1939
101. Bars and Stripes Forever* (Hardaway and Dalton/Apr 8/4:8) - 1939
102. Daffy Duck and the Dinosaur* (Jones/Apr 22/3:9) - 1939
103. Thugs with Dirty Mugs (Avery/May 6/1:3) - 1939
104. Naughty but Mice (Jones/May 20/4:9) - 1939
105. Believe It or Else (Avery/Jun 3/3:8) - 1939
106. Hobo Gadget Band (Hardaway and Dalton/Jun 17/4:8) - 1939
107. Old Glory (Jones/Jul 1/1:5) - 1939
108. Dangerous Dan McFoo (Avery/Jul 15/1:3) - 1939
109. Snow Man's Land (Jones/Jul 29/5:5) - 1939
110. Hare-um Scare-um (Hardaway and Dalton/Aug 12/2:2) - 1939
111. Detouring America (Avery/Aug 26/5:2) - 1939
112. Little Brother Rat (Jones/Sep 2/4:9) - 1939
113. Sioux Me (Hardaway and Dalton/Sep 9/3:10) - 1939
114. Land of the Midnight Fun (Avery/Sep 23/4:7) - 1939
115. Little Lion Hunter (Jones/Oct 7/2:4) - 1939
116. The Good Egg (Jones/Oct 21/4:2) - 1939
117. Fresh Fish (Avery/Nov 4/4:7) - 1939
118. Fagin's Freshman (Hardaway and Dalton/Nov 18/4:8) - 1939
119. Sniffles and the Bookworm (Jones/Dec 2/4:9) - 1939
120. Screwball Football (Avery/Dec 16/3:7) - 1939
121. The Curious Puppy (Jones/Dec 30/5:5) - 1939
122. The Early Worm Gets the Bird* (Avery/Jan 13/3:10) - 1940
123. Mighty Hunters (Jones/Jan 27/3:10) - 1940
124. Busy Bakers (Hardaway and Dalton/Feb 10/4:8) - 1940
125. Elmer's Candid Camera (Jones/Mar 2/2:2) - 1940
126. Cross-Country Detours (Avery/Mar 16/1:3) - 1940
127. Confederate Honey (Freleng/Mar 30/3:8) - 1940
128. The Bear's Tale (Avery/Apr 13/1:3) - 1940
129. The Hardship of Miles Standish (Freleng/Apr 27/2:9) - 1940
130. Sniffles Takes a Trip (Jones/May 11/1:5) - 1940
131. A Gander at Mother Goose (Avery/May 25/2:7) - 1940
132. Tom Thumb in Trouble (Jones/Jun 8/2:7) - 1940
133. Circus Today (Avery/Jun 22/3:5) - 1940
134. Little Blabbermouse (Freleng/Jul 6/4:5) - 1940
135. The Egg Collector (Jones/Jul 20/4:9) - 1940
136. A Wild Hare (Avery/Jul 27/1:2, 4:1) - 1940
137. Ghost Wanted (Jones/Aug 10/4:2) - 1940
138. Ceiling Hero (Avery/Aug 24/4:7) - 1940
139. Malibu Beach Party (Freleng/Sep 14/4:5) - 1940
140. Stage Fright (Jones/Sep 28/5:5) - 1940
141. Holiday Highlights (Avery/Oct 12/3:5) - 1940
142. Good Night, Elmer (Jones/Oct 26/2:10) - 1940
143. Wacky Wildlife (Avery/Nov 9/4:7) - 1940
144. Bedtime For Sniffles (Jones/Nov 23/2:10) - 1940
145. Of Fox and Hounds (Avery/Dec 7/2:9) - 1940
146. Shop, Look & Listen (Freleng/Dec 21/5:6) - 1940
147. Elmer's Pet Rabbit (Jones/Jan 4/2:2) - 1941
148. The Fighting 69½th (Freleng/Jan 18/5:3) - 1941
149. Sniffles Bells the Cat (Jones/Feb 1/4:9) - 1941
150. The Crackpot Quail (Avery/Feb 15/1:3) - 1941
151. The Cat's Tale (Freleng/Mar 1/3:4) - 1941
152. Tortoise Beats Hare (Avery/Mar 15/1:10) - 1941
153. Goofy Groceries (Clampett/Mar 29/2:5) - 1941
154. Toy Trouble (Jones/Apr 12/4:9) - 1941
155. The Trial of Mr. Wolf (Freleng/Apr 26/4:3) - 1941
156. Farm Frolics* (Clampett/May 10/3:6) - 1941
157. Hollywood Steps Out (Avery/May 24/1:9) - 1941
158. Hiawatha's Rabbit Hunt (Freleng/Jun 7/2:2) - 1941
159. The Wacky Worm (Freleng/Jun 21/3:4) - 1941
160. The Heckling Hare (Avery/Jul 5/1:7) - 1941
161. Inki and the Lion (Jones/Jul 19/3:10) - 1941
162. Aviation Vacation (Avery/Aug 2/3:5) - 1941
163. Sport Chumpions* (Freleng/Aug 16/3:7) - 1941
164. Snow Time For Comedy (Jones/Aug 30/4:2) - 1941
165. The Brave Little Bat (Jones/Sep 27/4:9) - 1941
166. The Bug Parade (Avery/Oct 11/4:7) - 1941
167. Rookie Revue* (Freleng/Oct 25/5:3) - 1941
168. Saddle Silly (Jones/Nov 8/4:7) - 1941
169. The Cagey Canary (Avery/Nov 22/3:5) - 1941
170. Rhapsody in Rivets (Freleng/Dec 6/1:6) - 1941
171. Wabbit Twouble (Clampett/Dec 20/1:4) - 1941
172. Hop, Skip and a Chump (Freleng/Jan 13/4:6) - 1942
173. The Bird Came C. O. D. (Jones/Jan 17/4:2) - 1942
174. Aloha Hooey (Avery/Jan 31/3:5) - 1942
175. Conrad the Sailor (Jones/Feb 28/4:4) - 1942
176. Crazy Cruise (Clampett/Mar 14/3:5) - 1942
177. The Wabbit Who Came to Supper* (Freleng/Mar 14/4:1) - 1942
178. Any Bonds Today?* (Clampett/Apr 2/4:1) - 1942
179. Horton Hatches the Egg (Clampett/Apr 11/1:4) - 1942
180. Dog Tired (Jones/Apr 25/4:2) - 1942
181. The Wacky Wabbit* (Clampett/May 2/2:5) - 1942
182. The Draft Horse (Jones/May 9/2:4) - 1942
183. Lights Fantastic (Freleng/May 23/3:4) - 1942
184. Hold the Lion, Please (Jones/Jun 13/2:2) - 1942
185. Double Chaser (Freleng/Jun 20/4:3) - 1942
186. Bugs Bunny Gets the Boid (Clampett/Jul 11/1:10) - 1942
187. Foney Fables* (Freleng/Aug 1/4:7) - 1942
188. The Squawkin' Hawk (Jones/Aug 8/3:3) - 1942
189. Fresh Hare* (Freleng/Aug 22/2:2) - 1942
190. Fox Pop* (Jones/Sep 5/4:2) - 1942
191. The Dover Boys at Pimento University* (Jones/Sep 19/1:5) - 1942
192. The Hep Cat (Clampett/Oct 3/1:4) - 1942
193. The Sheepish Wolf* (Freleng/Oct 17/4:3) - 1942
194. The Hare-Brained Hypnotist (Freleng/Oct 31/4:1) - 1942
195. A Tale of Two Kitties* (Clampett/Nov 21/1:2) - 1942
196. Ding Dog Daddy* (Freleng/Dec 5/3:4) - 1942
197. My Favorite Duck (Jones/Dec 5/1:5) - 1942
198. Case of the Missing Hare* (Jones/Dec 12/4:1) - 1942
199. Pigs in a Polka* (Freleng/Feb 6/1:6) - 1943
200. Tortoise Wins By a Hare (Clampett/Feb 20/1:10) - 1943
201. The Fifth-Column Mouse* (Freleng/Mar 6/5:3) - 1943
202. To Duck.... or Not to Duck* (Jones/Mar 6/2:8) - 1943
203. Flop Goes the Weasel (Note: The cartoon's original version was released without copyright protection. For the Blue Ribbon reissue, a copyright was filed. The reissue remains under copyright, but the original is in the public domain.) (Jones/Mar 20/2:4) - 1943
204. Super Rabbit (Jones/Apr 3/3:2) - 1943
205. The Unbearable Bear (Jones/Apr 17/2:10) - 1943
206. The Wise Quacking Duck (Clampett/May 1/2:8) - 1943
207. Greetings Bait (Freleng/May 15/3:7) - 1943
208. Yankee Doodle Daffy* (Freleng/Jun 5/2:8) - 1943
209. Jack-Wabbit and the Beanstalk (Freleng/Jun 12/2:7) - 1943
210. The Aristo Cat (Jones/Jun 19/1:5) - 1943
211. Wackiki Wabbit* (Jones/Jul 3/3:2) - 1943
212. Spies* (Jones/Aug/4:8) - 1943
213. Hiss and Make Up (Freleng/Sep 11/4:3) - 1943
214. A Corny Concerto* (Clampett/Sep 25/1:4) - 1943
215. Fin'n Catty (Jones/Oct 23/3:3) - 1943
216. Falling Hare* (Clampett/Oct 30/3:6) - 1943
217. Inki and the Minah Bird* (Jones/Nov 13/3:3) - 1943
218. Daffy-The Commando* (Freleng/Nov 20/2:8) - 1943
219. An Itch in Time (Clampett/Dec 4/2:5) - 1943
220. Little Red Riding Rabbit (Freleng/Jan 1/1:6) - 1944
221. What's Cookin' Doc? (Clampett/Jan 8/1:9) - 1944
222. Meatless Flyday (Freleng/Jan 29/4:6) - 1944
223. Tom Turk and Daffy (Jones/Feb 12/4:4) - 1944
224. Bugs Bunny and the Three Bears (Jones/Feb 26/3:2) - 1944
225. I Got Plenty of Mutton (Tashlin/Mar 11/3:6) - 1944
226. The Weakly Reporter (Jones/Mar 25/4:2) - 1944
227. Snafuperman* (Freleng/Mar/4:8) - 1944
228. Tick Tock Tuckered (Clampett/Apr 8/2:10) - 1944
229. Bugs Bunny Nips the Nips (Freleng/Apr 22/1:7) - 1944 (Note: This short is only featured in the set's original print.)
230. The Swooner Crooner (Tashlin/May 6/1:9) - 1944
231. Russian Rhapsody (Clampett/May 20/3:6) - 1944
232. Duck Soup to Nuts (Freleng/May 27/1:6) - 1944
233. Slightly Daffy (Freleng/Jun 17/3:9) - 1944
234. Hare Ribbin' (Clampett/Jun 24/1:7, 5:8) - 1944
235. Brother Brat (Tashlin/Jul 15/2:3) - 1944
236. Hare Force (Freleng/Jul 22/3:2) - 1944
237. From Hand to Mouse (Jones/Aug 5/3:3) - 1944
238. Birdy and the Beast (Clampett/Aug 19/3:6) - 1944
239. Buckaroo Bugs (Clampett/Aug 26/2:5) - 1944
240. Plane Daffy (Tashlin/Sep 16/2:3) - 1944
241. Lost and Foundling (Jones/Sep 30/2:4) - 1944
242. Booby Hatched (Tashlin/Oct 14/3:6) - 1944
243. The Old Grey Hare (Clampett/Oct 28/1:10) - 1944
244. The Stupid Cupid (Tashlin/Nov 25/2:8) - 1944
245. Stage Door Cartoon (Freleng/Dec 30/3:2) - 1944
246. Odor-Able Kitty (Jones/Jan 6/1:2) - 1945
247. Herr Meets Hare (Freleng/Jan 13/3:2) - 1945
248. Draftee Daffy (Clampett/Jan 27/2:5) - 1945
249. The Unruly Hare (Tashlin/Feb 10/1:7) - 1945
250. Trap Happy Porky (Jones/Feb 24/2:10) - 1945
251. Life With Feathers (Freleng/Mar 24/1:2) - 1945
252. Behind the Meat-Ball (Tashlin/Apr 7/2:3) - 1945
253. Hare Trigger (Freleng/May 5/1:6) - 1945
254. Ain't That Ducky (Freleng/May 19/3:9) - 1945
255. A Gruesome Twosome (Clampett/Jun 9/2:5) - 1945
256. A Tale of Two Mice (Tashlin/Jun 30/2:3) - 1945
257. Wagon Heels (Clampett/Jul 28/3:9) - 1945
258. Hare Conditioned (Jones/Aug 11/4:1) - 1945
259. Fresh Airedale (Jones/Aug 25/3:3) - 1945
260. The Bashful Buzzard (Clampett/Sep 15/1:8) - 1945
261. Peck Up Your Troubles (Freleng/Oct 20/3:4) - 1945
262. Hare Tonic (Jones/Nov 10/1:7) - 1945
263. Nasty Quacks (Tashlin/Dec 1/1:8) - 1945
264. The Return of Mr. Hook* (McKimson/5:8) - 1945
265. Tokyo Woes* (Clampett/5:8) - 1945
266. The Good Egg* (Jones/5:8) - 1945
267. Book Revue (Clampett/Jan 5/1:8) - 1946
268. Baseball Bugs (Freleng/Feb 2/3:7) - 1946
269. Holiday for Shoestrings (Freleng/Feb 23/4:3) - 1946
270. Quentin Quail (Jones/Mar 2/4:5) - 1946
271. Baby Bottleneck (Clampett/Mar 16/1:8) - 1946
272. Hare Remover (Tashlin/Mar 23/2:3) - 1946
273. Daffy Doodles (McKimson/Apr 6/1:8) - 1946
274. Hollywood Canine Canteen (McKimson/Apr 20/2:6) - 1946
275. Hush My Mouse (Jones/May 4/4:5) - 1946
276. Hair-Raising Hare (Jones/May 25/1:8) - 1946
277. Kitty Kornered (Clampett/Jun 8/1:4) - 1946
278. Hollywood Daffy (Freleng/Jun 22/1:9) - 1946
279. Acrobatty Bunny (McKimson/Jun 29/2:6) - 1946
280. The Eager Beaver (Jones/Jul 13/3:3) - 1946
281. The Great Piggy Bank Robbery (Clampett/Jul 20/1:4) - 1946
282. Bacall to Arms (Clampett and Davis/Aug 3/2:5) - 1946
283. Of Thee I Sting (Freleng/Aug 17/4:3) - 1946
284. Walky Talky Hawky (McKimson/Aug 31/1:2) - 1946
285. Racketeer Rabbit (Freleng/Sep 14/1:7, 3:4) - 1946
286. Fair and Worm-er (Jones/Sep 28/2:4) - 1946
287. The Big Snooze (Clampett/Oct 5/1:4) - 1946
288. The Mouse-Merized Cat (McKimson/Oct 19/2:6) - 1946
289. Mouse Menace (Davis/Nov 2/2:6) - 1946
290. Rhapsody Rabbit (Freleng/Nov 9/4:1) - 1946
291. Roughly Squeaking (Jones/Nov 23/2:9) - 1946
292. One Meat Brawl (McKimson/Jan 18/2:6) - 1947
293. The Goofy Gophers (Davis/Jan 25/2:9) - 1947
294. The Gay Anties (Freleng/Feb 15/4:3) - 1947
295. Scent-imental Over You (Jones/Mar 8/2:9) - 1947
296. A Hare Grows in Manhattan (Freleng/Mar 22/1:7) - 1947
297. Birth of a Notion (McKimson/Apr 12/2:8) - 1947
298. Tweetie Pie (Freleng/May 3/1:6) - 1947
299. Rabbit Transit (Freleng/May 10/1:10) - 1947
300. Hobo Bobo (McKimson/May 17/4:4) - 1947
301. Along Came Daffy (Freleng/Jun 14/3:9) - 1947
302. Inki at the Circus (Jones/Jun 21/1:5) - 1947
303. Easter Yeggs (McKimson/Jun 28/3:2) - 1947
304. Crowing Pains (McKimson/Jul 12/2:9) - 1947
305. A Pest in the House (Jones/Aug 2/2:10) - 1947
306. The Foxy Duckling (Davis/Aug 23/4:6) - 1947
307. House-Hunting Mice (Jones/Sep 6/3:3/Cine) - 1947
308. Little Orphan Airedale (Jones/Oct 4/1:8) - 1947
309. Doggone Cats (Davis/Oct 25/4:4/Cine) - 1947
310. Slick Hare (Freleng/Nov 1/1:9) - 1947
311. Mexican Joyride (Davis/Nov 29/2:6) - 1947
312. Catch as Cats Can (Davis/Dec 6/2:6) - 1947
313. A Horse Fly Fleas (McKimson/Dec 13/4:4/Cine) - 1947
314. Gorilla My Dreams (McKimson/Jan 3/1:7) - 1948
315. Two Gophers from Texas (Davis/Jan 17/4:4/Cine) - 1948
316. A Feather in His Hare (Jones/Feb 7/3:10) - 1948
317. What Makes Daffy Duck? (Davis/Feb 14/2:8/Cine) - 1948
318. What's Brewin', Bruin? (Jones/Feb 28/2:4) - 1948
319. Daffy Duck Slept Here (McKimson/Mar 6/2:10) - 1948
320. A Hick, a Slick, and a Chick (Davis/Mar 13/4:6/Cine) - 1948
321. Back Alley Oproar (Freleng/Mar 27/1:6) - 1948
322. I Taw a Putty Tat (Freleng/Apr 3/4:4/Cine) - 1948
323. Rabbit Punch (Jones/Apr 10/2:4) - 1948
324. Hop, Look, and Listen (McKimson/Apr 17/2:9) - 1948
325. Nothing But the Tooth (Davis/May 1/3:9) - 1948
326. Buccaneer Bunny (Freleng/May 8/4:1) - 1948
327. Bone Sweet Bone (Davis/May 22/4:6/Cine) - 1948
328. Bugs Bunny Rides Again (Freleng/Jun 12/1:10) - 1948
329. The Rattled Rooster (Davis/Jun 26/4:6) - 1948
330. The Up-Standing Sitter (McKimson/Jul 3/3:9/Cine) - 1948
331. The Shell Shocked Egg (McKimson/Jul 10/4:6) - 1948
332. Haredevil Hare (Jones/Jul 24/1:10) - 1948
