= Looney Tunes Collector's Choice =

Blu-ray collection

Looney Tunes Collector's Choice is a series of Blu-ray discs from Warner Bros. Home Entertainment's Warner Archive division collecting various Looney Tunes and Merrie Melodies theatrical animated short subjects from Warner Bros. Cartoons. According to Jerry Beck, the aim of this series is to release Looney Tunes and Merrie Melodies shorts that have been previously unavailable in restored form to animation fans and collectors on the various DVD and Blu-ray sets, such as the Looney Tunes Golden Collection, Looney Tunes Platinum Collection, Looney Tunes Super Stars, and Bugs Bunny 80th Anniversary Collection sets. Roughly 400 shorts had yet to be released in said DVD or Blu-ray format before the release of this series, but the series also includes shorts that were previously released as bonus features on various Warner Bros. DVDs. However those shorts included as bonus features were usually presented in unrestored form, whereas the Collector's Choice series uses newly restored versions.

This is the first Looney Tunes Blu-ray to be released through Warner Archive, as opposed to the main home video division (second overall home media release after the Porky Pig 101 DVD set in 2017). Four volumes were released in 2023 and 2024. A four-disc set, Looney Tunes Collector's Choice: Volumes 1–4, containing all four volumes in the series, was released on November 26, 2024.

On March 14, 2025, Warner Archive announced a spiritual successor to the Collector's Choice series, entitled Looney Tunes Collector's Vault - which would include two discs and contain 50 cartoons, with the first volume releasing on June 17, 2025.

== Volume 1 ==
Looney Tunes Collector's Choice: Volume 1
- Blu-ray Disc cover
- Directed by: Chuck Jones; Friz Freleng; Arthur Davis; Robert McKimson; Frank Tashlin
- Produced by: Leon Schlesinger; Eddie Selzer; John W. Burton
- Starring: Mel Blanc
- Music by: Carl Stalling; Milt Franklyn
- Distributed by: Warner Bros. Home Entertainment
- Release date: May 30, 2023
- Country: United States
- Language: English

Looney Tunes Collector's Choice: Volume 1 was announced on March 28, 2023 and released on May 30, 2023. Keeping with tradition with other Golden Age of Animation releases by Warner Archive (such as Popeye the Sailor: The 1940s and Tex Avery Screwball Classics), Looney Tunes Collector's Choice: Volume 1 is a single-disc set with no bonus material. The set contains 20 cartoons that were previously unavailable on DVD or Blu-ray, all presented uncut and digitally restored.

Beanstalk Bunny (1955) and Catch as Cats Can (1947) were sourced from new 4K scans from the original camera negatives. According to Jerry Beck, the set was delayed for almost a full year because the Library of Congress had difficulty shipping the camera negatives for Catch as Cats Can to the Warner Bros. Studio in Burbank. The other cartoons on this set had previously been restored for the HBO Max streaming service in 2020 - with Warner Bros. removing many of them from the service earlier that same year. However, for this release Warner Archive corrected many of the errors initially made by HBO Max, such as Photoshopped title cards.

The set includes the following cartoons:

#	Title	Characters	Year	Director	Series
1	Beanstalk Bunny	Bugs, Daffy, Elmer	1955	Chuck Jones	MM
2	Catch as Cats Can	Sylvester	1947	Arthur Davis	MM
3	The Unruly Hare	Bugs, Elmer	1945	Frank Tashlin	MM
4	His Bitter Half	Daffy	1950	Friz Freleng	MM
5	Daffy Doodles	Daffy, Porky	1946	Robert McKimson	LT
6	Cracked Quack	Daffy, Porky	1952	Friz Freleng	MM
7	Little Orphan Airedale	Charlie, Porky	1947	Chuck Jones	LT
8	Hip Hip-Hurry!	Wile E. Coyote and the Road Runner	1958	Chuck Jones	MM
9	Hot-Rod and Reel!	Wile E. Coyote and the Road Runner	1959	Chuck Jones	LT
10	Greedy for Tweety	Sylvester, Tweety, Granny, Hector	1957	Friz Freleng	LT
11	Stooge for a Mouse	Sylvester, Hector	1950	Friz Freleng	MM
12	A Mouse Divided	Sylvester	1953	Friz Freleng	MM
13	A Fractured Leghorn	Foghorn	1950	Robert McKimson	MM
14	Plop Goes the Weasel	Foghorn, Barnyard	1953	Robert McKimson	LT
15	Tale of Two Mice	Babbit and Catstello	1945	Frank Tashlin	LT
16	The Foxy Duckling		1947	Arthur Davis	MM
17	Two Gophers from Texas	Goofy Gophers	1948	Arthur Davis	MM
18	Doggone Cats	Sylvester	1947	Arthur Davis	MM
19	What's Brewin', Bruin?	The Three Bears	1948	Chuck Jones	LT
20	The Bee-Deviled Bruin	The Three Bears	1949	Chuck Jones	MM

== Volume 2 ==
Looney Tunes Collector's Choice: Volume 2
- Blu-ray Disc cover
- Directed by: Chuck Jones; Friz Freleng; Tex Avery; Robert McKimson; Frank Tashlin; Arthur Davis; Abe Levitow; Norman McCabe; Maurice Noble
- Produced by: Leon Schlesinger; Eddie Selzer; John W. Burton; David H. DePatie
- Starring: Mel Blanc
- Music by: Carl Stalling; Milt Franklyn; William Lava
- Distributed by: Warner Bros. Home Entertainment
- Release date: December 12, 2023
- Country: United States
- Language: English

Animation historian and curator, Jerry Beck and Warner Archive President George Feltenstein indicated that strong sales of Volume 1 could result in future volumes, with more cartoons and multiple discs. On September 18, 2023, due to strong sales of Volume 1, Warner Archive announced Looney Tunes Collector's Choice: Volume 2 — which included 25 cartoons and was released on December 12, 2023.

This set included 25 cartoons never before released on DVD or Blu-ray - five more than on Volume 1. In contrast to the previous volume, Volume 2 focuses more on miscellaneous "one-shot" cartoons and characters.

Like the previous volume, only two cartoons - Brother Brat (1944) and Ghost Wanted (1940) - were specifically restored for this release, while the other cartoons - including One Meat Brawl (1947), which was initially released on the Looney Tunes Super Stars' Porky & Friends: Hilarious Ham DVD set in an unrestored form - were previously restored for HBO Max and MeTV, with Warner Archive correcting the Photoshopped title cards - most notably on A Hound for Trouble (1951). In addition Cross Country Detours (1940) had its original opening title sequence restored, as opposed to the Blue Ribbon reissue titles featured on previous releases.

The set includes the following cartoons:

#	Title	Characters	Year	Director	Series
1	Behind the Meat-Ball		1945	Frank Tashlin	LT
2	Brother Brat	Porky	1944	Frank Tashlin	LT
3	Catty Cornered	Sylvester, Tweety, Rocky	1953	Friz Freleng	MM
4	Cross Country Detours		1940	Tex Avery	MM
5	Daffy's Southern Exposure	Daffy	1942	Norman McCabe	LT
6	Ding Dog Daddy		1942	Friz Freleng	MM
7	The Eager Beaver		1946	Chuck Jones	MM
8	Fair and Worm-er		1946	Chuck Jones	MM
9	Fin'n Catty		1943	Chuck Jones	MM
10	From Hand to Mouse		1944	Chuck Jones	LT
11	Ghost Wanted		1940	Chuck Jones	MM
12	Greetings Bait	Wacky Worm	1943	Friz Freleng	MM
13	Hamateur Night	Proto-Elmer	1939	Tex Avery	MM
14	Hare-Breadth Hurry	Bugs, Wile E.	1963	Chuck Jones, Maurice Noble	LT
15	A Hick, a Slick, and a Chick		1948	Arthur Davis	MM
16	Hiss and Make Up		1943	Friz Freleng	MM
17	A Hound for Trouble	Charlie	1951	Chuck Jones	MM
18	I Wanna Be a Sailor		1937	Tex Avery	MM
19	The Leghorn Blows at Midnight	Foghorn, Barnyard, Henery	1950	Robert McKimson	LT
20	Lickety-Splat	Wile E. Coyote and the Road Runner	1961	Chuck Jones, Abe Levitow	LT
21	One Meat Brawl	Porky, Barnyard	1947	Robert McKimson	MM
22	The Penguin Parade		1938	Tex Avery	MM
23	Rabbit Rampage	Bugs, Elmer (cameo)	1955	Chuck Jones	LT
24	The Rebel Without Claws	Sylvester, Tweety	1961	Friz Freleng	LT
25	The Wacky Worm	Wacky Worm	1941	Friz Freleng	MM

== Volume 3 ==
Looney Tunes Collector's Choice: Volume 3
- Blu-ray Disc cover
- Directed by: Chuck Jones; Robert McKimson; Friz Freleng; Tex Avery; Arthur Davis; Gerry Chiniquy; Earl Duvall; Maurice Noble
- Produced by: Leon Schlesinger; Eddie Selzer; John W. Burton; David H. DePatie
- Starring: Mel Blanc
- Music by: Carl Stalling; Milt Franklyn; William Lava
- Distributed by: Warner Bros. Home Entertainment
- Release date: March 12, 2024
- Country: United States
- Language: English

On January 23, 2024, Warner Archive announced Looney Tunes Collector's Choice: Volume 3 — which also includes 25 cartoons and was released on March 12, 2024.

Like the previous volumes, only two cartoons were specifically restored for this release - Mexican Joyride (1947) and Riff Raffy Daffy (1948) - while all the other cartoons - including Punch Trunk (1953), which was previously released as a bonus short on the Looney Tunes Golden Collection: Volume 6 DVD set in an unrestored form - were previously restored for HBO Max and MeTV, with Warner Archive fixing most of the Photoshopped title cards. Riff Raffy Daffy was originally released on the Looney Tunes Super Stars' Porky & Friends: Hilarious Ham DVD set but in an unrestored form. For this release Riff Raffy Daffy was given a brand-new transfer. Since the original separation exposure negatives are thought to be lost, critics noted that while Riff Raffy Daffy doesn't look as pristine as the other cartoons on the set, it still looks far superior than on previous releases. Hobo Bobo (1947) also had its original opening titles restored.

The set includes the following cartoons:

#	Title	Characters	Year	Director	Series
1	A Feud There Was	Proto-Elmer	1938	Tex Avery	MM
2	China Jones	Daffy, Porky	1959	Robert McKimson	LT
3	Cinderella Meets Fella	Proto-Elmer	1938	Tex Avery	MM
4	Dumb Patrol	Bugs, Sam	1964	Gerry Chiniquy	LT
5	Egghead Rides Again	Egghead	1937	Tex Avery	MM
6	Elmer's Pet Rabbit	Bugs, Elmer	1941	Chuck Jones	MM
7	Hobo Bobo		1947	Robert McKimson	MM
8	Honeymoon Hotel		1934	Earl Duvall	MM
9	Hop, Skip and a Chump		1942	Friz Freleng	MM
10	I Only Have Eyes for You		1937	Tex Avery	MM
11	Mexican Joyride	Daffy	1947	Arthur Davis	LT
12	The Mouse on 57th Street		1961	Chuck Jones	MM
13	Mr. and Mrs. Is the Name	Buddy	1935	Friz Freleng	MM
14	Of Rice and Hen	Foghorn, Barnyard, Prissy	1953	Robert McKimson	LT
15	Pre-Hysterical Hare	Bugs, Elmer	1958	Robert McKimson	LT
16	Punch Trunk		1953	Chuck Jones	LT
17	Quentin Quail		1946	Chuck Jones	MM
18	Riff Raffy Daffy	Daffy, Porky	1948	Arthur Davis	LT
19	Saddle Silly		1941	Chuck Jones	MM
20	Sheep Ahoy	Ralph and Sam	1954	Chuck Jones	MM
21	The Sheepish Wolf		1942	Friz Freleng	MM
22	There Auto Be a Law		1953	Robert McKimson	LT
23	Tugboat Granny	Sylvester, Tweety, Granny	1956	Friz Freleng	MM
24	War and Pieces	Wile E. Coyote and the Road Runner	1964	Chuck Jones, Maurice Noble	LT
25	Wet Hare	Bugs, Blacque Jacque	1962	Robert McKimson	LT

== Volume 4 ==
Looney Tunes Collector's Choice: Volume 4
- Blu-ray Disc cover
- Directed by: Friz Freleng; Robert McKimson; Chuck Jones; Tex Avery; Bob Clampett; Arthur Davis; Norman McCabe; Hawley Pratt
- Produced by: Leon Schlesinger; Eddie Selzer; John W. Burton; David H. DePatie; Friz Freleng
- Starring: Mel Blanc
- Music by: Carl Stalling; Milt Franklyn; William Lava
- Distributed by: Warner Bros. Home Entertainment
- Release date: November 26, 2024
- Country: United States
- Language: English

On July 30, 2024, Warner Archive announced Looney Tunes Collector's Choice: Volume 4 — which also includes 25 cartoons and was released on November 26, 2024. This time there were three newly restored cartoons for the set: Holiday for Drumsticks (1949), Muzzle Tough (1954) and Peck Up Your Troubles (1945). The rest - including Mouse-Warming (1952), which was originally included as an unrestored bonus short on the Looney Tunes Mouse Chronicles: The Chuck Jones Collection Blu-ray and DVD sets - were all previously restored for HBO Max and MeTV. The set also included two bonus cartoons: Stork Naked (1955) and Lighter Than Hare (1960) presented in their original 4:3 aspect ratios (both cartoons were previously released on the Looney Tunes Super Stars DVD sets, however were cropped to 16:9).

The set includes the following cartoons:

#	Title	Characters	Year	Director	Series
1	Along Came Daffy	Daffy, Sam	1947	Friz Freleng	LT
2	A Bone for a Bone	Goofy Gophers	1951	Friz Freleng	LT
3	The Cagey Canary		1941	Tex Avery, Bob Clampett	MM
4	D' Fightin' Ones	Sylvester	1961	Friz Freleng	MM
5	Dangerous Dan McFoo		1939	Tex Avery	MM
6	Devil's Feud Cake	Bugs, Sam	1963	Friz Freleng	MM
7	Double Chaser		1942	Friz Freleng	MM
8	Double or Mutton	Ralph and Sam	1955	Chuck Jones	LT
9	Fox Pop		1942	Chuck Jones	MM
10	Henhouse Henery	Barnyard, Foghorn, Henery	1949	Robert McKimson	LT
11	Holiday for Drumsticks	Daffy	1949	Arthur Davis	MM
12	Hopalong Casualty	Wile E. Coyote and the Road Runner	1960	Chuck Jones	LT
13	Hyde and Go Tweet	Sylvester, Tweety	1960	Friz Freleng	MM
14	The Impatient Patient	Daffy	1942	Norman McCabe	LT
15	Leghorn Swoggled	Barnyard, Foghorn, Henery	1951	Robert McKimson	MM
16	Meatless Flyday		1944	Friz Freleng	MM
17	Mouse-Warming	Claude	1952	Chuck Jones	LT
18	The Mouse-Merized Cat	Babbit and Catstello	1946	Robert McKimson	MM
19	Muscle Tussle	Daffy	1953	Robert McKimson	MM
20	Muzzle Tough	Granny, Hector, Sylvester, Tweety	1954	Friz Freleng	MM
21	Peck Up Your Troubles	Sylvester, Hector	1945	Friz Freleng	MM
22	Quack Shot	Daffy, Elmer	1954	Robert McKimson	MM
23	Road to Andalay	Speedy, Sylvester	1964	Friz Freleng, Hawley Pratt	MM
24	The Sneezing Weasel		1938	Tex Avery	MM
25	Streamlined Greta Green		1937	Friz Freleng	MM

=== Bonus shorts ===
#	Title	Characters	Year	Director	Series
B1	Lighter Than Hare	Bugs, Sam	1960	Friz Freleng	MM
B2	Stork Naked	Daffy	1955	Friz Freleng	MM

== See also ==
- Looney Tunes and Merrie Melodies filmography
  - Looney Tunes and Merrie Melodies filmography (1930–1939)
  - Looney Tunes and Merrie Melodies filmography (1940–1949)
  - Looney Tunes and Merrie Melodies filmography (1950–1959)
  - Looney Tunes and Merrie Melodies filmography (1960–1969)
  - Looney Tunes and Merrie Melodies filmography (1970–present)
