= I Wanna Be a Sailor =

1937 film by Fred Avery

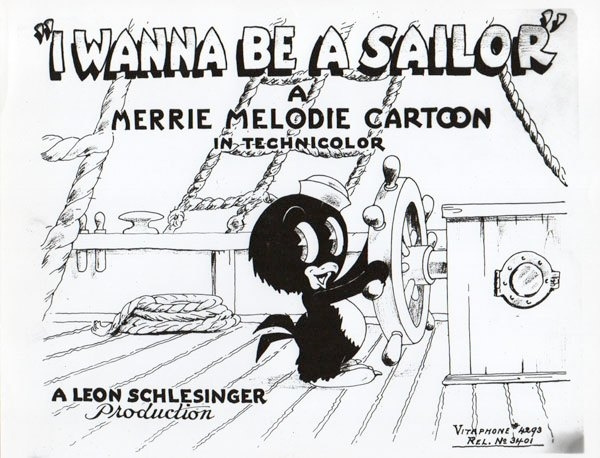
- Lobby card
- Directed by: Fred Avery
- Produced by: Leon Schlesinger
- Starring: Mel Blanc; Elvia Allman; Billy Bletcher; Bernice Hansen; Robert Wrinkler (all uncredited)
- Music by: Carl W. Stalling
- Animation by: Paul Smith; Virgil Ross
- Color process: Technicolor
- Production company: Leon Schlesinger Productions
- Distributed by: Warner Bros. Productions; The Vitaphone Corporation
- Release date: September 25, 1937
- Running time: 7 min
- Country: United States
- Language: English

I Wanna Be a Sailor is a 1937 American animated comedy short film directed by Fred Avery. The short was released on September 25, 1937. It is the 83rd film in the Merrie Melodies series. It was re-released as a "Blue Ribbon" reissue in 1949, rendering the original film and credits lost. It is the oldest color Warner Bros. cartoon to currently be in the public domain, as United Artists, then parent of Associated Artists Productions, neglected to renew its copyright in 1966.

== Plot ==
Video for the short

A mother parrot in a cage is teaching her three children to say, "Polly want a cracker." The first two kids, Patrick and Patricia, manage after some effort, but Peter boldly refuses as he wants to be a sailor like his father. His mother tells him that their father, which unbeknownst to Peter is an abusive drunkard, left for Catalina (misremembered as Hawaii) while being drunk and never returned home. She flashed a searchlight and hoped for his return to no avail. To his mother's horror, Peter cries because of being disappointed, not convinced that being a sailor would be a mistake.

Peter leaves home to become a sailor. He bumps into a barrel, from which he builds a ship with a red pajama for a sail. He meets a curious but loquacious duckling, whom he silences by clamping his beak shut with a clothespin, but allows him to join in as a deck-swab. He uses a warning label from a poison bottle for a Jolly Roger flag, as they set sail. He enjoys breezing through the water and spits licorice like it is tobacco into the water towards a conveniently placed spittoon.

A thunderstorm brews, to the duckling's pleasure, while Peter, having never encountered poor weather, struggles to adapt. The anchor causes the barrel to break; the duckling has had enough of Peter's incompetence, but nevertheless brings him to shore before leaving. To the horror of Peter's mother, Peter has not learnt a single thing and still wants to be a sailor, causing her to ask the audience for assistance before passing out again.

== Voice cast ==
- Robert "Bobby" Winkler as Peter Parrot
  - Danny Webb as Peter Parrot for the line "...I am a Man!" (reused from Egghead Rides Again)
- Mel Blanc as Dizzy Duck
- Elvia Allman as Mother Parrot
- Billy Bletcher as Father Parrot
- Tommy Bond as Patrick Parrot
- Bernice Hansen as Patricia Parrot

== Home media ==
- LaserDisc - The Golden Age of Looney Tunes: Volume 3, Side 5 (unrestored)
- DVD - Kid Galahad (US dubbed version)
- Blu-ray - Looney Tunes Collector's Choice: Volume 2 (restored)
