= Daffy Doodles =

- Directed by: Robert McKimson
- Story by: Warren Foster
- Starring: Mel Blanc; Robert C. Bruce
- Music by: Carl W. Stalling
- Animation by: Richard Bickenbach; Arthur Davis; Cal Dalton; I. Ellis; A.C. Gamer (effects); Don Williams; Anatole Kirsanoff; Ray Patin
- Backgrounds by: Richard H. Thomas
- Color process: Technicolor
- Production company: Warner Bros. Cartoons
- Distributed by: Warner Bros. Pictures
- Release date: April 6, 1946 (USA)
- Running time: 7 min (one reel)
- Language: English

Daffy Doodles is a 1946 Warner Bros. Looney Tunes cartoon directed by Robert McKimson. It was released on April 6, 1946, and stars Daffy Duck and Porky Pig.

Daffy is the notorious "mustache fiend", bent on putting a mustache on every lip in sight, while Porky is a police officer intent on capturing him.

The cartoon is the first full-length one that McKimson directed. (He previously directed the wartime short The Return of Mr. Hook.) Mel Blanc provided the voices for the characters, and Warren Foster was the writer.

== Plot ==
In a metropolis of the eastern hemisphere, inhabitants are gripped by fear and law enforcement perplexed, as the entire urban landscape becomes inundated with an enigmatic phenomenon: mustaches painted ubiquitously on advertisements and even unsuspecting individuals. Amidst this scenario, Daffy Duck emerges as the self-professed culprit, breaking the fourth wall to the audience and justifying his actions through poetic verse. Daffy reveals his singular mission: to adorn every face with a mustache.

Porky Pig assumes the role of a police officer, devising a stratagem involving a picture frame to ensnare Daffy. However, Daffy outwits Porky with a cunning ruse, transforming himself into a Christmas present to perpetrate his mischievous deed. Engaging in a pursuit through the city's subway system to a rousing rendition of 42nd Street, Daffy deftly eludes Porky while adorning commuters with mustaches, further complicating the pursuit.

As the chase escalates, Porky confronts Daffy atop a towering billboard, culminating in a precarious confrontation where Daffy seemingly plunges to his demise, only to orchestrate yet another mischief by adorning Porky with a mustache. The chase ensues with escalating absurdity, involving a motorbike pursuit, a crash through a skylight, and Daffy's strategic placement of additional mustaches on Porky.

Ultimately, the escapade culminates in a courtroom scene, where Daffy stands trial before a stern bulldog judge, but an entire jury of mustachioed Jerry Colonnas acquits him. Following a verdict of not guilty, Daffy vows to forsake his mustache-drawing endeavors, opting for beards instead. However, true to his irrepressible nature, Daffy concludes his antics by defiantly adorning the judge with a beard and obscuring the screen with paint.

== Voice Cast ==
- Mel Blanc as Daffy Duck / Porky Pig / Judge / Jerry Colonna Jury
- Robert C. Bruce as The Narrator

== Home media ==
- VHS 1986 - Viddy-Oh! For Kids Cartoon Festivals: Porky Pig & Daffy Duck Cartoon Festival featuring "Tick Tock Tuckered" - MGM/UA Home Video
- VHS 1988 - Cartoon Moviestars: Porky! - MGM/UA Home Video
- Laserdisc 1988 - Cartoon Moviestars: Daffy! and Porky! - MGM/UA Home Video
- Laserdisc 1991 - The Golden Age of Looney Tunes: Volume 1 - MGM/UA Home Video
- VHS 1992 - The Golden Age of Looney Tunes: Vol. 8 - 1940s Zanies - MGM/UA Home Video
- VHS 1999 - Looney Tunes: The Collector's Edition, Vol. 4 - Daffy Doodles - Warner Home Video/Columbia House
- DVD 2007 - My Reputation (extra, unrestored) - Warner Home Video
- Blu-Ray 2023 - Looney Tunes Collector's Choice: Volume 1 (restored) - Warner Archive Collection

== See also ==
- Daffy Duck filmography
- Porky Pig filmography
- Looney Tunes and Merrie Melodies filmography (1940–1949)
