= One Cab's Family =

- Directed by: Tex Avery
- Written by: Rich Hogan; Roy Williams
- Produced by: Fred Quimby
- Starring: Daws Butler; June Foray; Tex Avery
- Music by: Scott Bradley
- Production company: Metro-Goldwyn-Mayer cartoon studio
- Distributed by: Metro-Goldwyn-Mayer; Loew's Incorporated
- Release date: May 17, 1952
- Running time: 8 minutes
- Country: United States
- Language: English

One Cab's Family is a 1952 Metro-Goldwyn-Mayer cartoon short directed by Tex Avery about the arrival of a yellow taxi cab "child". The title is a play on the radio soap opera program One Man's Family.

== Plot ==
A yellow taxi named John (voiced by Daws Butler), along with his wife Mary (a blue taxi car, voiced by June Foray), awaits the arrival of their new son, who looks just like John. Within his first few months, Junior is fed, changed, learns to "walk", gets his first "tooth" (a spark plug), etc.

When Mary asks Junior if he is going to grow up to be a taxi cab like his father, Junior declines and turns on the television to show an auto race, implying that he wants to grow up being a race car. John is very angered by this and sends Junior to his room, but Junior is still determined to live his dream as a race car. As such, Junior converts himself into a hot rod convertible before zooming around the house in front of John. Enraged by Junior's defiance, John spanks him (by opening his trunk, exposing his bare buttocks) and sends him back to his room, demanding him to go back to his taxi persona. Fed up with his father's refusal to accept his choice, Junior angrily sneaks out the window, fuels up with high octane gas, and goes zooming all around town, spooking everything in his way.

Upon seeing Junior escaping, John chases after him, but can't seem to catch him because of the octane gas. However, John gets his second wind when he sees Junior racing alongside a train, playing chicken with it. After another chase, John runs out of gas and ends up being stuck on the railroad track. Upon seeing his father in danger, a horrified Junior goes back to save his father by pushing him away from the track, but ends up run over by the train himself, much to John's shock.

The injured Junior is then sent to a garage to be fixed. As John weeps over his son's fate and is very grateful for saving his life, a repairman tells John that Junior will survive and asks John to have either the taxi cab or hot rod converted on Junior. Feeling extremely remorseful for pushing Junior away from his dream of being a race car in the first place, John states that Junior is old enough to make that decision himself, implying that he's willing to accept Junior's choice of being either a taxi cab or a hot rod. Eventually, Junior decides to convert back as a taxi cab, much to John's happiness, but it turns out to be a compromising decision, as Junior shows he still has the hot rod motor and exhaust pipes.

== Voice Cast ==
- Daws Butler as John (Father Cab) / The Doctor
- June Foray as Mary (Mother Cab) / The Receptionist / The Nurse
- Tex Avery as Junior's hiccups / The Second Doctor

== See also ==
- Streamlined Greta Green - a 1937 Merrie Melodies cartoon short similar in content
- Little Johnny Jet
- Susie the Little Blue Coupe
