= Mexican Joyride =

- Directed by: Arthur Davis
- Story by: Dave Monahan
- Starring: Mel Blanc
- Music by: Carl W. Stalling
- Animation by: Character animation: Don Williams; Basil Davidovich; J.C. Melendez; Herman Cohen; Cal Dalton (uncredited)
- Layouts by: Thomas McKimson
- Backgrounds by: Philip DeGuard
- Color process: Technicolor
- Production company: Warner Bros. Cartoons
- Distributed by: Warner Bros. Pictures
- Release date: November 29, 1947 (USA)
- Running time: 7 minutes (one reel)
- Language: English

Mexican Joyride is a 1947 Warner Bros. Looney Tunes cartoon directed by Arthur Davis and written by Dave Monahan. The cartoon was released on November 29, 1947, and stars Daffy Duck.

== Plot ==
Daffy Duck drives to Mexico for a vacation, and after a harrowing experience with the local cuisine that literally sets his mouth afire, Daffy goes to a bullfight ring to observe the spectacle. When Daffy jeers at the bull, the horned beast removes the clothes from the human matador and puts them on Daffy as a challenge to the duck to fight the bull in the ring.

Daffy foils the bull with a proposed wager on a hat trick, betting the bull to guess which of three sombreros Daffy is hiding under. Daffy sees to it that the bull guesses wrong and supplies a machine gun for the impoverished bull to commit suicide. The bull realizes that he is being fooled and, firing the machine gun, chases Daffy out of the bullfight ring. Daffy scrambles to his car to leave Mexico, thinking he has escaped the belligerent bull, but unaware that the bull is riding in the back seat of his vehicle.

== Voice Cast ==
- Mel Blanc as Daffy Duck / Bull / Mexican Bar Patron / Mexican Bartender / Mexican Program Seller

== Home media ==
- VHS 1988 - Cartoon Moviestars: Daffy! - MGM/UA Home Video
- Laserdisc 1988 - Cartoon Moviestars: Daffy! & Porky! - MGM/UA Home Video
- Laserdsic 1992 - The Golden Age of Looney Tunes: Volume 2 - MGM/UA Home Video
- Blu-Ray 2024 - Looney Tunes Collector's Choice: Volume 3 (restored) - Warner Archive Collection

== See also ==
- Daffy Duck filmography
- Looney Tunes and Merrie Melodies filmography (1940–1949)
