= A Mouse Divided =

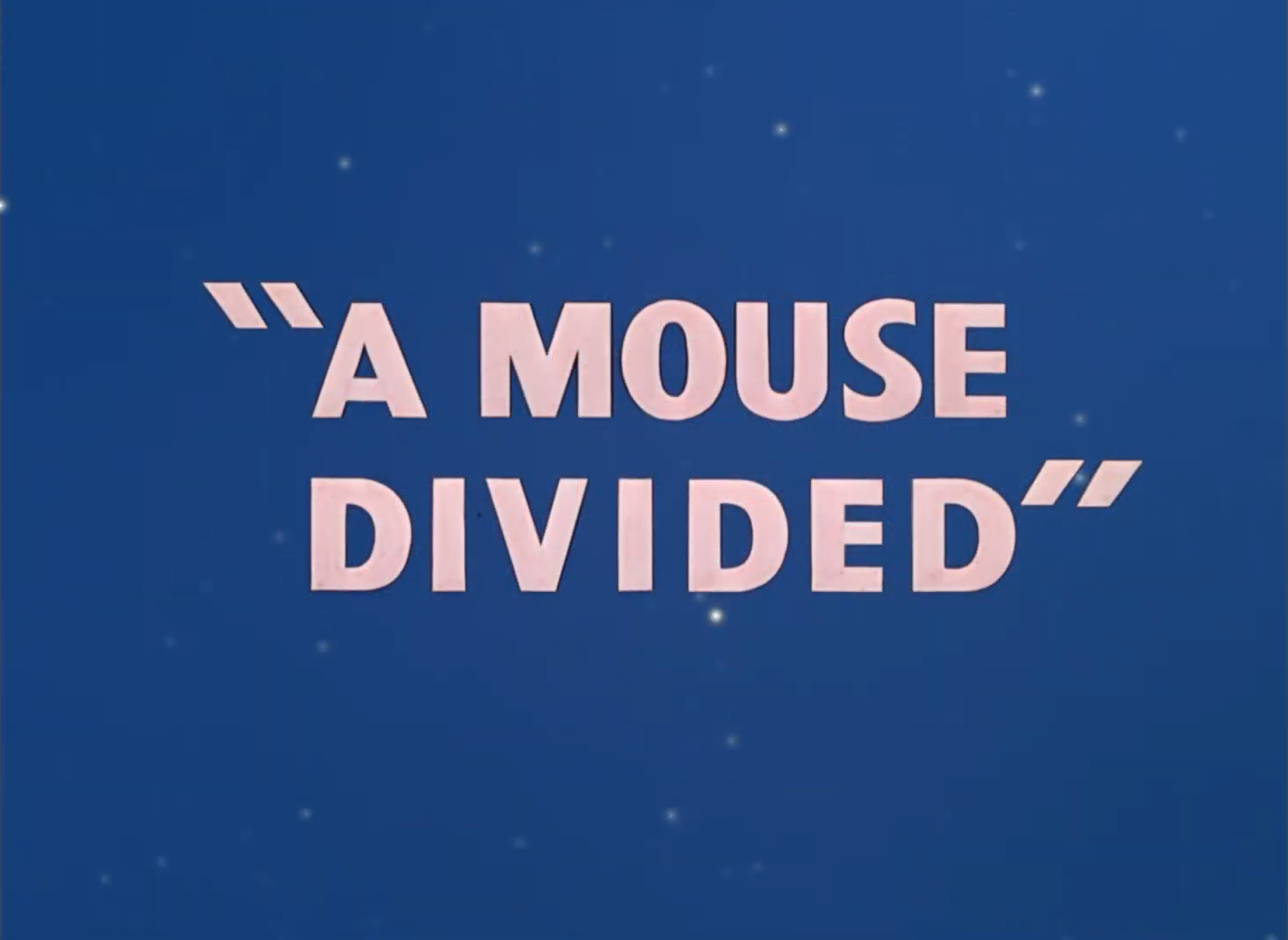
- Title card
- Directed by: I. Freleng
- Story by: Warren Foster
- Starring: Mel Blanc; Bea Benaderet
- Edited by: Treg Brown
- Music by: Carl Stalling
- Animation by: Arthur Davis; Manuel Perez; Virgil Ross; Ken Champin
- Layouts by: Hawley Pratt
- Backgrounds by: Irv Wyner
- Color process: Technicolor
- Production company: Warner Bros. Cartoons
- Distributed by: Warner Bros. Pictures; The Vitaphone Corporation
- Release date: January 31, 1953 (USA)
- Running time: 6:30
- Language: English

A Mouse Divided is a 1953 Merrie Melodies animated short directed by Friz Freleng. The short was released on January 31, 1953, and stars Sylvester. The title is a pun on Lincoln's House Divided Speech.

In the film, Sylvester and his wife receive their first son from a drunken stork, and this son is a mouse. Sylvester struggles between his desire to eat the mouse and his protective feelings about his son.

== Plot ==
At a nightclub, a stork gets drunk just before delivering a baby. Meanwhile, Sylvester's wife complains to her husband that she wishes she had a baby. The stork, unable to continue, leaves the bundle to be delivered to Sylvester and his wife's house. The two cats find a baby mouse inside, and while she immediately takes a liking to the newcomer when the baby calls her "Mama", Sylvester wants to eat it, but his wife stops him. Later, as Sylvester's wife goes out (and isn't seen again for the rest of the cartoon) he tries once more to eat it, but his heart also melts when the baby rodent calls him "Daddy". He then takes his new son for a walk in a pram, but finds himself chased by a horde of cats who want to eat the mouse too. Even at home, Sylvester isn't safe, as several cats try numerous attempts to break into the house and eat the mouse (from dressing up as a salesman and Santa Claus. to sawing a hole through the floor under the cradle, to simply trying to knock the door down with a battering ram), but Sylvester thwarts all their attempts. Meanwhile, the stork from earlier, having to retrieve the baby animal and return it to its real parents, lowers a slice of cheese from the chimney with a fishing rod. Believing it to be yet another trap and wanting to teach the cats a lesson, Sylvester reels in the fishing line, but the stork hauls him up and, still drunk, mistakes Sylvester for the mouse. The cat is then handed over to a couple of mice, where the female declares that nothing like this ever happened on her side of the family, while her husband looks at the audience with wide eyes.

== Voice Cast ==
- All Other Voices are provided by Mel Blanc
- Bea Benaderet voices Mrs. Sylvester, Female Mouse

== Home media ==
This short is available on the Looney Tunes Collector's Choice: Volume 1 Blu-ray.
