= Pagan Moon =

1932 film

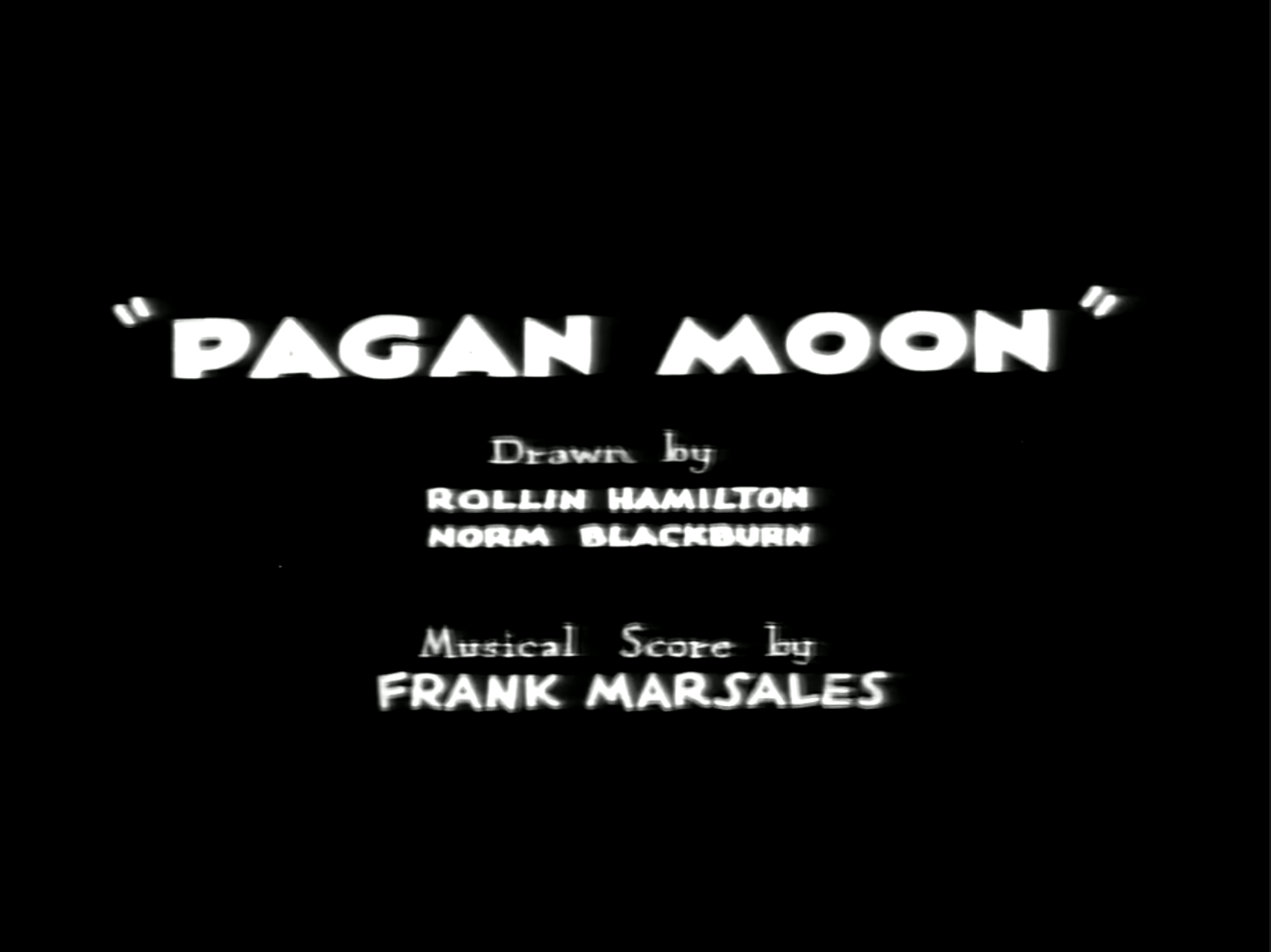
- Title card
- Directed by: Rudolf Ising
- Produced by: Hugh Harman; Rudolf Ising; Leon Schlesinger
- Music by: Frank Marsales
- Animation by: Rollin Hamilton; Norm Blackburn
- Color process: Black-and-white
- Production companies: Harman-Ising Productions; Leon Schlesinger Productions
- Distributed by: Warner Bros. Pictures; The Vitaphone Corporation
- Release date: January 31, 1932
- Running time: 7 min.
- Country: United States
- Language: English

Pagan Moon is a 1932 American animated musical comedy film. It is the seventh film in the Merrie Melodies series. It was directed by Rudolf Ising. The short was released as early as January 31, 1932.

== Summary ==
The full short

A pair of Polynesian natives frolic on a beach at dusk; the boy sings the title song and accompanies himself on a ukulele while the girl dances. Two older companions also play the ukulele and sing. The boy eventually switches to scat singing while the surrounding nature follows suit in playing music.

This continues until the boy unknowingly jumps on an alligator who eats his ukulele. He angrily pursues the alligator, who baits him into continuously attempting to reach for it. The boy slyly uses a branch to keep the alligator's mouth open and retrieves the ukulele. He joyfully prances across the island and lands on an unusually fast tortoise, angering it as it falls into the water and paddles away in its shell.

The boy jumps onto a boat occupied by the girl, using his ukulele to paddle the boat as they sing along. Unfortunately, he carelessly drops the ukulele into the depths of the ocean. He dives and hides inside a hole to dodge a large fish. The ukulele passes a decrepit piano in the bottom of the ocean, where the boy encounters a menacing octopus, only to please him by playing the piano. The other fish follow suit while the octopus has a turn at the piano.

The large fish arrives, causing the fish and the boy to flee. To escape, the boy blows a large air bubble out of a pipe and enters it, floating in it through the water and into the air. An inquisitive bird pops it and loses its plumage, causing the boy to fall. The girl spots him and rides a pelican, who successfully catches him. The duo celebrate despite not recovering the ukulele.

== Home media ==
The cartoon is on Laserdisc in Volume Three of The Golden Age of Looney Tunes.
