= Fox Pop =

1942 film by Charles M. Jones

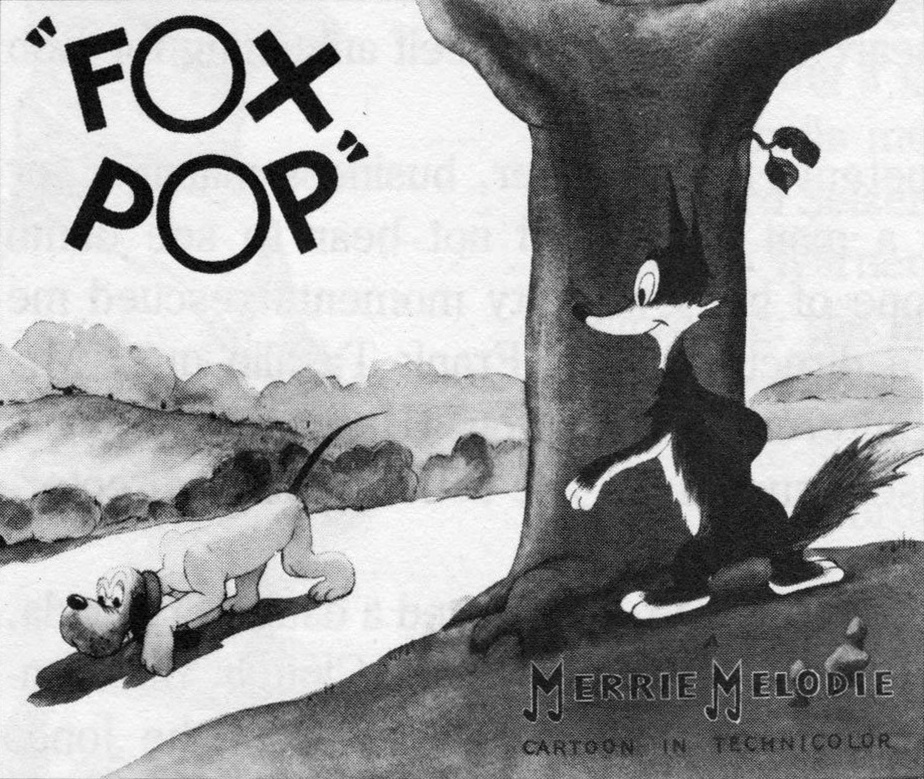
- Lobby card
- Directed by: Charles M. Jones
- Story by: Tedd Pierce
- Produced by: Leon Schlesinger
- Starring: Mel Blanc
- Music by: Carl W. Stalling
- Animation by: Philip DeLara
- Color process: Technicolor
- Production company: Leon Schlesinger Productions
- Distributed by: Warner Bros. Pictures
- Release date: September 5, 1942
- Running time: 8 min
- Country: United States
- Language: English

Fox Pop is a 1942 American animated comedy short film directed by Chuck Jones. The short was released on September 5, 1942. It is part of the Merrie Melodies series. It was re-released as a "Blue Ribbon" reissue in 1946, rendering the original film and credits lost.

== Plot ==
Video in the 2020 restored version for the short.

A man is relaxing inside his cabin, listening to his radio; outside, a red fox is on the prowl. With apparent sinister intent, the animal creeps to the door then springs into the house, but rather than attack the man, he steals the radio, bringing it to a part of the forest where he grabs a nearby ax and starts destroying the radio. Two crows on a tree branch above are confused, and one asks, "What's bitin' you anyhow?", so the fox begins telling them, via flashbacks:

While scrounging for food in trash cans outside the same cabin, the fox overhears an advertisement on the radio for the Sterling Silver Fox Farm saying foxes are in style this year for well-dressed ladies. Badly misinterpreting this message, the fox believes he could be adopted and become the pampered pet of a wealthy, adoring owner, and so rushes to the farm.

At the farm, the fox inserts part of his tail into a fox trap, but as the trap is for silver foxes only, the trapper kicks him into a nearby garbage heap. Discovering a can of silver paint there, the fox coats himself with the paint, repeats the ruse, and gets promptly caged by the trapper.

In the cage, the faux silver fox is told by an actual silver fox in the next cage over they are all escaping that night. When the painted fox laughs and says he is quite happy to stay, the silver fox simply replies he's "with us, or..." and makes a throat-cutting gesture. Again, the painted fox badly misinterprets the message, believing the silver fox intends to kill him if he does not join them, and so tries pointing out his cage is locked and there is no key as an excuse to stay. For the answer, the silver fox bites down hard on the nail file he is holding at an angle that turns it into a perfect copy of the trapper's cage key.

At nine o'clock, the silver foxes escape. The painted fox feigns joy at being set free, but deliberately falls back, re-enters his cage and re-locks the door. Now alone, he notices a tag attached to his cage, reading, "This skin reserved for 'Silver Fox Cape for Mrs. Van Dough'". This, and his question of how his skin will be removed being then answered by the sound of the trapper sharpening his ax outside, thus realizing the true meaning of the silver fox's throat-cutting gesture, has him finally understand that the radio advertisement was not promoting live fox pets, but coats made from their pelts, throwing him into a panic.

As the trapper enters, ax in hand, the fox grabs the cage key, unlocks his cage and flees into the woods. Angered, the trapper sends his hunting dogs after him. After a long chase, the fox jumps into a lake and swims to the other side, where he notices the silver paint has washed off. Believing this to be his ticket to safety, he stops the dogs and informs them he is not and never was a silver fox, and therefore no longer have a reason to chase him, but the dogs respond, "Silver Shmilver... as long as you're a fox!" and proceed to beat him up.

The flashback ends and the fox ends his story with "And that's what's bitin' me. That's what!", and in a surprising show of support, the crows drop down and finish destroying the radio.

== Release ==
Fox Pop was released on September 5, 1942. It was later reissued as a Blue Ribbon release on September 28, 1946. It has since been made available to the public domain after years of copyright neglect by United Artists.

== Home media ==
Fox Pop was released on The Golden Age of Looney Tunes Volume 4 LaserDisc, on July 14, 1993, and an unrestored version of Fox Pop was included as a bonus feature on the Kings Row DVD.

In September 2024, it was announced that Fox Pop would be released, restored and uncut, on the Looney Tunes Collector's Choice: Volume 4 Blu-Ray set, which was released in November 2024.
