= Beanstalk Bunny =

1955 short film by Chuck Jones

- Directed by: Charles M. Jones
- Story by: Michael Maltese
- Starring: Mel Blanc
- Music by: Carl Stalling
- Animation by: Ken Harris; Richard Thompson; Abe Levitow; Keith Darling
- Layouts by: Bob Givens
- Backgrounds by: Richard H. Thomas
- Color process: Technicolor
- Production company: Warner Bros. Cartoons
- Distributed by: Warner Bros. Pictures; The Vitaphone Corporation
- Release date: February 12, 1955
- Running time: 7:00
- Language: English

Beanstalk Bunny is a 1955 Warner Bros. Merrie Melodies cartoon directed by Chuck Jones. The short was released on February 12, 1955, and stars Bugs Bunny, Daffy Duck and Elmer Fudd. The cartoon's plot is a parody of the fairy tale Jack and the Beanstalk, and is the second Warner Bros. cartoon after Jack-Wabbit and the Beanstalk based on said story.

== Plot ==
Daffy Duck initiates the tale in the guise of Jack, lamenting the recent exchange of a prized Holstein cow for three seemingly insignificant beans. Disenchanted by his trade, Daffy discards the beans, unwittingly setting off a chain of events as they land in Bugs Bunny's rabbit hole. Subsequently, a towering beanstalk emerges, prompting Daffy to embark on a climb, recognizing the narrative's necessity for progression.

During his ascent, Daffy encounters Bugs, who is slumbering in his bed ensnared by the beanstalk. Dismissing Bugs, Daffy forges ahead, intent on seizing the fortunes rumored to lie within the giant's castle. However, his enthusiasm wanes upon encountering the giant personified by Elmer Fudd. Fleeing from Elmer's menacing presence, Daffy's predicament intensifies as Bugs joins him atop the beanstalk.

In a bid to evade capture, Bugs improvises a ruse, persuading Elmer that Daffy is the elusive Jack of legend. A tumultuous debate ensues over identity, culminating in their apprehension by Elmer. Incarcerated within the castle, Bugs and Daffy narrowly escape a perilous fate, utilizing an ACME glass cutter to thwart Elmer's intentions.

A frantic pursuit ensues, with Elmer relentlessly pursuing the duo throughout his domain. Amidst the chaos, Bugs manages to incapacitate Elmer, offering an opportunity for escape. While Bugs elects to depart, Daffy's avarice compels him to remain, harboring aspirations of absconding with the giant's treasures.

Meanwhile, Bugs stumbles upon Elmer's expansive carrot garden, indulging in the colossal produce. As night falls, Bugs retires beneath a gargantuan carrot, pondering Daffy's fate. Daffy, ensnared within Elmer's pocket watch, resigns himself to his predicament.

== Cast ==
- Mel Blanc as Bugs Bunny and Daffy Duck

== Home media ==
This cartoon is available on the laserdisc release Hare Beyond Compare and on the VHS cassette Daffy Duck: The Nuttiness Continues.... Until 2023, this short was unavailable on DVD or Blu-ray. It was rumored that the original negative stored in the Warner Bros. vault was damaged, but was reported in July 2020 that a restoration was being worked on. The short was eventually released on home media as part of the Looney Tunes Collector's Choice: Volume 1 Blu-ray released in 2023.

== See also ==
- List of American films of 1955

Preceded by Baby Buggy Bunny	Bugs Bunny Cartoons; 1955	Succeeded by Sahara Hare
