= Mouse-Warming =

- Directed by: Charles M. Jones
- Story by: Michael Maltese
- Music by: Carl Stalling (direction); Milt Franklyn (orchestration)
- Animation by: Ben Washam; Lloyd Vaughn; Ken Harris
- Layouts by: Robert Gribbroek
- Backgrounds by: Philip de Guard
- Color process: Technicolor
- Production company: Warner Bros. Cartoons
- Distributed by: Warner Bros. Pictures
- Release date: September 6, 1952
- Running time: 6:38

Mouse-Warming is a 1952 Warner Bros. Looney Tunes short directed by Chuck Jones. The cartoon was released on September 6, 1952 and stars Claude Cat in his final solo cartoon. The title is a play on "housewarming".

== Plot ==
In a garden, a wind-up toy truck labelled under ACME Moving Co. pulls up to a mousehole door, and two moving mice move the contents of the van into the hole. Afterwards, a young girl mouse and her parents move in. The girl mouse soon sees a boy mouse driving a motorized hot rod toy into his garage and walking up to his own mousehole. When he sees her, the boy mouse instantly falls head over heels in love. He quickly empties his sugar bowl of the one sugar cube in it, and takes the empty bowl over to the girl mouse's home. However, Claude Cat sees him and tries to eat the boy mouse, but he escapes back to his mousehole. Claude tries to grab him but ends up getting his hand caught in a mousetrap.

Later on, the boy mouse tries using a pipeline to sneak past Claude but the cat takes a doll house front door, puts it over his own mouth and places himself at the end of the pipeline. The mouse, with an empty jug in hand, unknowingly enters and travels down into Claude's stomach where he lights a match. The flame causes Claude to jump in pain and the mouse to escape simultaneously.

Later, Claude observes the two lovers and gets an idea to entrap the boy mouse. Claude writes a fake letter to the boy mouse that reads "Dear Mister Mouse, I am in my teens - sixteen months - and deemed not unattractive by my friends. Can you meet me at eight tonight under the garbage disposal? yours (?) Alice (the girl across the way)," and sprays some perfume on it for good measure. Claude sends the fake letter to the boy mouse who, upon reading it, falls over in lust. By 7:55 pm, the boy mouse drives to the trash can in the kitchen where he meets what he thinks is the girl mouse but is really a puppet being used by Claude to ensnare him. Upon seeing Claude, the boy mouse escapes with the puppet and knocks Claude out with the trash can lid.

As the boy mouse sighs over both his failure and being deceived with the puppet, Claude writes another fake letter, this time sending it to the girl mouse's father. The letter itself delivers a warning apparently from the boy mouse that reads, "Look you! I saw that apartment first, so get out - because I'm moving in!! The mouse across the way - P.S. or else!!" The father mouse promptly grabs a revolver as if to say "we'll see about that!" while outside Claude puts out a sign that reads "Boarder Wanted" and draws the boy mouse's attention to it. Upon seeing it, the boy mouse packs his things and moves in. Claude positions himself so that he catches the fleeing boy mouse in his mouth, but his plan simultaneously succeeds when the boy mouse runs into his mouth and backfires when the father mouse shoots him in the face, allowing the boy mouse to escape.

Determined not to let Claude get the better of him again, the boy mouse writes a fake letter of his own and sends it to him. The letter this time reads, "Dear Cat (Pal) I've decided to give up my evil ways and be nice to you. Yours in Friendship, The Dog - P.S. How's about coming over for a game of Canasta?" Claude falls for it and gets a huge beating from Hector (here named Butcher) when he tries to go over to his kennel for a card game. Meanwhile, the two young mice, having gotten Claude out of the way, raid the fridge and sip on some soda as the cartoon ends (with a heart-shaped iris out).

== Home media ==
Mouse-Warming is available as a bonus short on Looney Tunes Mouse Chronicles: The Chuck Jones Collection DVD and Blu-ray set, uncut but unrestored. In November 2024, an uncut and restored version of Mouse-Warming was released on the Looney Tunes Collector's Choice: Volume 4 Blu-ray set.
