= Ghost Wanted =

1940 film by Charles Jones

- Title card
- Directed by: Charles Jones
- Story by: Dave Monahan
- Produced by: Leon Schlesinger
- Starring: Fred Avery
- Music by: Carl W. Stalling
- Animation by: Bob McKimson
- Color process: Technicolor
- Production company: Leon Schlesinger Productions
- Distributed by: Warner Bros. Pictures
- Release date: August 10, 1940
- Running time: 7 min
- Country: United States
- Language: English

Ghost Wanted is a 1940 American animated short film directed by Charles Jones. The short was released on August 10, 1940. It is part of the Merrie Melodies series. Its premise is similar to Famous Studios' Casper the Friendly Ghost, whose creation precedes the film but not the production of the film series.

== Plot ==
The short starts out in the little ghost's house as he is reading a book titled How To Haunt Houses showing various recommended haunting positions that are usually successful for ghosts. He tries out a few of the positions by posing and then reads the Haunt Ads in the Saturday Evening Ghost (dated Saturday December 13, 1939 - date that was actually a Wednesday).

He comes across a haunting job that does not require experience at the address of 1313 Dracula Drive that he likes. He changes from his white "suit/sheets" into a new light blue colored "suit" (he also puts on a white hat) and is invisible for the interim between changing "suits". Even though he can pass through closed doors like an ordinary ghost, he prefers opening them while passing through.

He arrives at the house at 1313 Dracula Drive, which is on a mountain, and tries out for the house-haunting job, but ends up getting terrorized by a bigger ghost interviewing him for the position.

The ghost terrorizes him by yelling "Boo!", sending him a Ghostal Telegraph that says "Boo!", and dropping a lit firecracker that resembles an M-80 that the little ghost just barely runs away from.

The bigger ghost's plans backfire on him when the fuses of the fireworks he put in his "back pocket" get lit by the lit match he dropped. He is sent flying throughout the house after the little ghost and ultimately into a well somewhere outside the building. The little ghost flees to his own house.

== Releases ==
This film is included on The Golden Age of Looney Tunes (Vol. 4) LaserDisc release.

The cartoon was released on the Looney Tunes Collector's Choice: Volume 2 Blu-ray Disc as a restored transfer from the original camera negative.
