= A Hound for Trouble =

A Hound For Trouble
- Directed by: Charles M. Jones
- Story by: Michael Maltese
- Starring: Mel Blanc
- Music by: Carl W. Stalling
- Animation by: Phil Monroe; Ken Harris; Ben Washam; John Carey; Lloyd Vaughan
- Layouts by: Robert Gribbroek
- Backgrounds by: Philip DeGuard
- Color process: Technicolor
- Production company: Warner Bros. Cartoons
- Distributed by: Warner Bros. Pictures
- Release date: April 28, 1951
- Country: United States
- Language: English

A Hound For Trouble is a 1951 Warner Bros. Merrie Melodies cartoon short directed by Chuck Jones. The cartoon was released on April 28, 1951, and features Charlie Dog.

The film has Charlie attempt to take over a restaurant in Pisa, while its owner is on a short break. Charlie's behavior drives away a customer. The restaurant's owner eventually seems to accept Charlie as a partner, but he actually uses the dog's newfound trust to fool him.

== Plot ==
After being found on a shipping boat in the coast of Italy, Charlie is found by the ship's owner (who thought he kicked him off earlier) and is kicked off (again). Trying to find a new 'master', Charlie keeps asking people in English, but they keep responding 'no capisce' ("I don't understand"). Charlie eventually spots a restaurant owner opening his shop and makes himself at home (the shop owner actually speaking English) before being kicked out of the restaurant.

As he returns, Charlie sees that the owner has gone out for 15 minutes ("15 minootsa") and decides to run the restaurant himself. Charlie first enrages the one customer who comes in. The customer orders "Na Bella Piatta Del Una Cacciatore Di Tetrazzini Cu Ragù Di Marinara Di La Piazza Rigotini Mozzarella Fina". Charlie tells him that they're out of this, so the customer orders the spaghetti instead. Charlie, after feeding him spaghetti from a spool, serves grape juice he presses with his feet in front of the customer, causing the customer to rush out, sickened. When the shop owner returns, Charlie tries to convince the owner that they need a 'floor show' (singing "Atsa Matta for You?"). The owner finally appears to relent and starts walking Charlie home.

The owner suddenly yells that the Tower of Pisa (which Charlie, being unfamiliar with the monument, does not realize is perpetually leaning) is "about to fall on that little house!" The owner then has Charlie hold up the tower while he 'calls for help' (instead just going back to his restaurant). Charlie is left 'holding up' the tower, calling out for help and asking "Doesn't anyone around here capice?!"

== Voice cast ==
- Mel Blanc as Charlie Dog, Pizzeria Owner
- Michael Maltese as Customer (uncredited)

== Home media ==
This short is available on the Looney Tunes Collector's Choice: Volume 2 Blu-ray.
