= Riff Raffy Daffy =

- Title card
- Directed by: Arthur Davis
- Story by: William Scott; Lloyd Turner
- Starring: Mel Blanc
- Music by: Carl Stalling
- Animation by: Don Williams; Emery Hawkins; Basil Davidovich; J.C. Melendez
- Layouts by: Don Smith
- Backgrounds by: Philip DeGuard
- Color process: Technicolor (production); Cinecolor (release)
- Production company: Warner Bros. Cartoons
- Distributed by: Warner Bros. Pictures; The Vitaphone Corporation
- Release date: November 27, 1948
- Running time: 6:48
- Language: English

Riff Raffy Daffy is a 1948 Warner Bros. Looney Tunes cartoon directed by Arthur Davis. The cartoon was released on November 27, 1948, and stars Daffy Duck and Porky Pig.

== Plot ==
In a city park, Daffy Duck faces eviction from patrol officer Porky Pig for violating vagrancy laws. Desperate for shelter on a cold night, Daffy sneaks into a department store's window display, sparking a silent quarrel with Porky separated by glass. Daffy cleverly outwits Porky using tricks and distractions, but Porky eventually knocks him unconscious. Feeling guilty, Porky offers sympathy, recognizing Daffy's plight, and allows him to stay in the store, likening their situations as parents to wind-up toy offspring.

== Voice Cast ==
- Mel Blanc as Daffy Duck / Porky Pig / Gopher / Cuckoo Clock Bird

== Home Media ==
- Laserdisc 1994 - Guffaw and Order: Looney Tunes Fight Crime - Warner Home Video
- DVD 2012 - Looney Tunes Super Stars' Porky & Friends (unrestored) - Warner Home Video
- Blu-Ray 2024 - Looney Tunes Collector's Choice: Volume 3 (restored) - Warner Archive Collection

== See also ==
- Daffy Duck filmography
- Porky Pig filmography
- Looney Tunes and Merrie Melodies filmography (1940–1949)

Preceded by The Stupor Salesman	Daffy Duck cartoons 1948	Succeeded by Wise Quackers
