= One Meat Brawl =

- Blue Ribbon title card
- Directed by: Robert McKimson
- Story by: Warren Foster
- Starring: Mel Blanc; Stan Freberg
- Music by: Carl Stalling
- Animation by: Cal Dalton; Richard Bickenbach; I. Ellis; Rod Scribner; Arthur Davis; Anatolle Kirsanoff; Fred Abranz; Manny Gould; Don Williams; A.C. Gamer (Effects)
- Layouts by: Cornett Wood
- Backgrounds by: Richard H. Thomas
- Color process: Technicolor
- Production company: Warner Bros. Cartoons
- Distributed by: Warner Bros. Pictures
- Release date: January 18, 1947
- Running time: 7:05
- Country: United States
- Language: English

One Meat Brawl is a 1947 Warner Bros. Merrie Melodies cartoon directed by Robert McKimson. The short stars Porky Pig and Barnyard Dawg (here referred to as Mandrake), and was released on January 18, 1947. The title is a takeoff on the popular song "One Meat Ball".

== Plot ==
In the woodland setting of Grover Groundhog's abode, the arrival of Groundhog Day prompts various characters to engage in activities emblematic of the occasion. Grover, dismissing the significance of his shadow in predicting weather patterns, finds himself embroiled in an escapade when he emerges from his burrow for photographers, only to encounter hunters disguised as paparazzi.

Meanwhile, Porky and his faithful canine companion, Mandrake, embark on their own hunt for a groundhog. Mandrake's initial foray into the woods leads to a series of encounters with Grover, whom Mandrake mistakes for their quarry. Despite Grover's attempts to dissuade Mandrake from aiding Porky's hunt, the dog's sympathy for Grover's plight momentarily halts their pursuit. Subsequent antics involving disguises and exchanges ultimately culminate in a realization that leads to a peaceful resolution.

As the trio engages in a lighthearted confrontation within Grover's home, it is revealed to be a playful bout of shadow-boxing, cleverly orchestrated to ensure no harm befalls anyone involved.

== Production notes ==
During the production of One Meat Brawl, Bob Clampett left Warner Bros. Cartoons, and Arthur Davis took over his role after leaving McKimson's unit. Davis' new position as director also led to his and McKimson's units shuffling animators, leading to nine artists being credited on the animator draft sheet, which was unusual as most cartoons from Warner Bros. at the time were usually animated by four-six artists. Also, the cartoon's production number was initially MM-10-15 but was later changed to 1015, signaling a new 4-digit system and the merging of Looney Tunes and Merrie Melodies cartoons under one numbering system. Despite these changes, the cartoon was released in January 1947, two years after its story was finalized.

Several recording sessions were also held during production. The first session, featuring Mel Blanc and Stan Freberg, occurred on March 17, 1945. Another session, solely with Stan Freberg, took place on March 31 to record the voice of Walter Winchell coming from Grover Groundhog's radio, coinciding with dialogue recording for Roughly Squeaking. On June 29, 1946, another recording session was held, this time only with Mel Blanc, for dialogue whose details are unknown. Finally, on July 6, 1946, a recording session for the musical score was conducted, with arranger Milt Franklyn overseeing the process.

== Home media ==
- VHS:
  - Viddy-Oh! For Kids Cartoon Festivals: Porky Pig and Daffy Duck Cartoon Festival Featuring "Tick Tock Tuckered"
  - Viddy-Oh! For Kids Cartoon Festivals: Porky Pig Cartoon Festival Featuring "Tom Turk and Daffy"
- LaserDisc: The Golden Age of Looney Tunes, Volume 2, Side 6
- DVD: Looney Tunes Super Stars' Porky & Friends: Hilarious Ham (USA 1995 Turner print)
- Blu-Ray: Looney Tunes Collector's Choice: Volume 2 (restored)

== See also ==
- Porky Pig filmography
- Looney Tunes and Merrie Melodies filmography (1940–1949)
