= The Shell Shocked Egg =

- Directed by: Robert McKimson
- Story by: Warren Foster
- Starring: Mel Blanc; The Sportsmen Quartet; Lloyd Turner
- Music by: Carl Stalling
- Animation by: Charles McKimson; Manny Gould; I. Ellis
- Layouts by: Cornett Wood
- Backgrounds by: Richard H. Thomas
- Color process: Technicolor
- Production company: Warner Bros. Cartoons
- Distributed by: Warner Bros. Pictures; The Vitaphone Corporation
- Release date: July 10, 1948
- Running time: 6:45 (Blue Ribbon release)
- Language: English

The Shell Shocked Egg is a 1948 Warner Bros. Merrie Melodies cartoon directed by Robert McKimson. The short was released on July 10, 1948.

The plot concerns a baby turtle named Clem who is only partly hatched and looks for a warm place to finish hatching while running into a dog and rooster who break out into a feud over ownership of the egg while Clem's family frantically searches for him at the beach.

The cartoon's plot is very similar to Frank Tashlin's Booby Hatched, released in 1944.

== Plot ==
At the beach, a mother turtle brings down her four eggs and finds a good place to hatch them out. Burying each egg in the sand, she sticks out four signs for the baby turtles' names (Tom, Dick, Harry, Clem) before leaving to fetch a sunlamp. While the mother turtle is gone, one of the turtle eggs (Clem) re-emerges from the sand as the sun gets covered by clouds. Unable to hatch without any source of heat, Clem wanders out of the beach to search for a heat source. He first tries to cross a street, nearly being run over by cars. He then comes across a pond before he eventually makes it a nearby farm, continuing his search for a warm spot.

Meanwhile, Clem's mother beings back a sunlamp for her baby eggs to hatch. In perfect harmony, Tom, Dick, and Harry hatch singing out their names one by one and together as a group. Clem's mother tells them to come along, but just as they start to leave the beach, she suddenly gets a feeling that something is amiss, when she realizes to her horror that Clem is missing. Going into a blind panic, Clem's mother takes the shovel and starts digging in the spot where Clem's egg was, while Tom, Dick, and Harry join the search with smaller shovels whilst continuing to sing in unison.

Back at the farm, Clem comes across a farmyard dog, believing he has found a warm spot, but leaves after thinking he lost it. The dog, believing he has laid an egg, thinks he would have fame and fortune out of this misconception. So he decides to go after Clem, who runs into a henhouse. Clem hides under a sleeping hen. The dog retrieves the eggs back, only for the hen to panic and cry for help, thinking that the dog is stealing one of her eggs. A large rooster confronts the dog and retrieves Clem from his clutches.

After a contentious back-and-forth struggle between the dog and rooster, Clem is chased back to the beach. Most of the beach has been dug up by Clem's mother and brothers, who at this point are using an excavator. Clem's mother discovers the three and uses her excavator to scoop them up, retrieving Clem whilst whacking the dog and rooster with a mallet. Happy to have her fourth son back, Clem's mother rushes the baby turtle to the sunlamp, finally letting him hatch. However, Clem, realizing something, remarks in a now lower-pitched voice, "Well now wouldn't you just know it? I'm still in a gob-blang shell!" as the cartoon ends.

== Voice cast ==
- Mel Blanc - Clem, Mother Turtle, Dog, Hen and Rooster
- The Sportsmen Quartet - Clem's siblings
- Lloyd Turner - Clem (post-hatching)

== Home media ==
This film is available on the LaserDisc set The Golden Age of Looney Tunes. It was also available on HBO Max from 2020 to 2025, restored for the first time. In 2024 it was released as an extra on the Blu-ray release of Act of Violence (1948).
