= The Penguin Parade =

1938 film by Fred Avery

- Title card
- Directed by: Fred Avery
- Story by: J. B. Hardaway
- Produced by: Leon Schlesinger
- Starring: Mel Blanc
- Music by: Carl W. Stalling
- Animation by: Paul Smith
- Color process: Technicolor
- Production company: Leon Schlesinger Productions
- Distributed by: Warner Bros. Productions; The Vitaphone Corporation
- Release date: April 23, 1938
- Running time: 7 min
- Country: United States
- Language: English

The Penguin Parade is a 1938 American animated comedy short film directed by Fred Avery. It is the 93rd film in the Merrie Melodies series, featuring the titular song by Byron Gay.

== Plot ==
Penguins operate Club Iceberg. A rich penguin gets himself a drink from a walrus bartender, who literally pours every ingredient into the penguin and shakes him, causing him to become incredibly drunk. The penguin listens to a story told by another walrus and laughs with him. After a lengthy introduction from the master of ceremonies, the Penguin Parade occurs, with penguins marching down a staircase and walking on each other's feet into mid-air before falling in a coordinated manner.

The next performance involves a Bing Crosby-like crooner penguin, who sings "When My Dreamboat Comes Home", followed by three singers who sing at a lighter and faster pace. An orchestra then plays a jazz piece. After its conclusion, the penguins relax for a bit and is spurred into playing the next piece by a drummer penguin. A walrus cellist uses a stove-like cello which the conductor shovels coals into, causing the performance to speed up further. A walrus caricature of Fats Waller plays a piano which falls down and is raised. A female walrus dances with three penguins. After a thrilling encore, the performance concludes and the band expresses to the patrons that they are too tired to continue performing for the night in this manner.

== Voice cast ==
- Mel Blanc as Drunk Penguin/Dancing Penguin
- Cliff Nazarro as Double Talking MC/Bong Crosby
- Tex Avery as Walrus
- Paul Taylor Group (Vocal Quartet)

== Reception ==
Motion Picture Exhibitor (April 15, 1938): "A musical revue at an Artie Penguin Night Club. "Fats Waller" pounds out music. There is an amusing little double talking M.C. Animation is very smooth, music is hot, tuneful. This constitutes a moderately funny cartoon for all classes."

== Home media ==
- Laserdisc - Golden Age of Looney Tunes: Volume 2, Side 1 (unrestored)
- Blu-Ray - Looney Tunes Collector's Choice: Volume 2 (restored)
