= Meatless Flyday =

1944 Warner Bros. cartoon directed by Friz Freleng

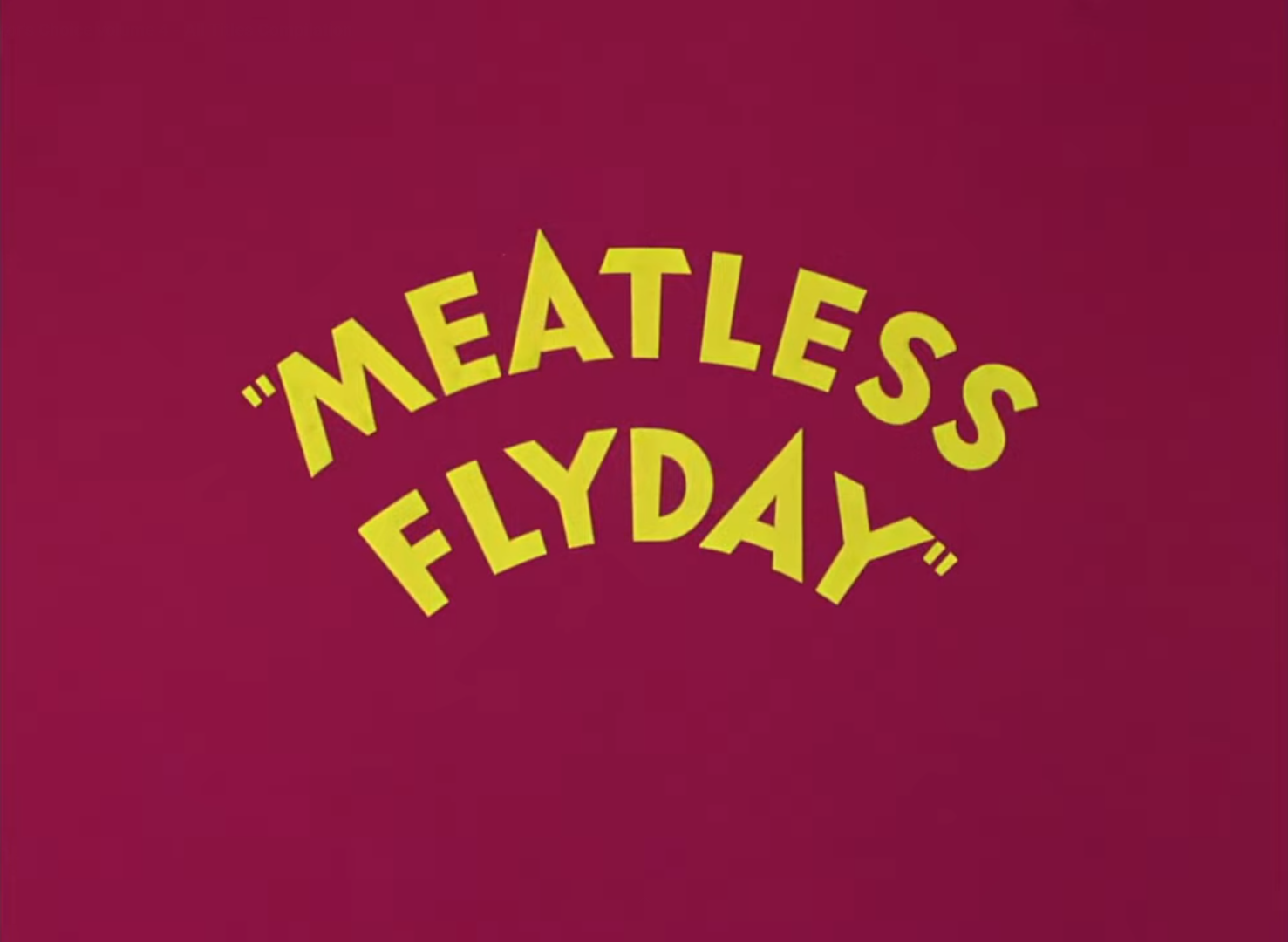
- Title card
- Directed by: Friz Freleng
- Written by: Michael Maltese
- Starring: Mel Blanc, Cy Kendall
- Music by: Carl W. Stalling
- Animation by: Jack Bradbury
- Production company: Leon Schlesinger Productions
- Distributed by: Warner Bros. Pictures
- Release date: January 29, 1944 (United States)
- Running time: 6 minutes
- Country: United States
- Language: English

Meatless Flyday is a 1944 Warner Bros. Merrie Melodies directed by Friz Freleng. The short was released on January 29, 1944.

The title is a pun on meatless Friday, a reference to the traditional Roman Catholic practice of abstinence from meat on Fridays.

== Plot ==
An overconfident and guffawing spider (voiced by Cy Kendall) spots his intended prey, a mute fly, on the ceiling, and indulges in various cat-and-mouse schemes to try to catch him for food, including painting a load of buckshot with "Kandy Kolor" and luring the fly to eat it and drawing him closer with a magnet, which only succeeds in attracting a set of metal cutlery which the spider has to dodge to save himself. At one point the fly manages to set fire to the spider's feet, and as the spider nose-dives like an airplane he exclaims "Look! I'm a Zero, I'm a Zero," referring to the Mitsubishi Zero fighter plane used by the Japanese during World War II. He sees the fly on a wedding cake as a bride and dresses as the groom only to be blown up by a dynamite stick.

Eventually, the spider catches his prey, and, when he is about to carve him up while singing the song "Would You Like to Take a Walk?", the fly points to a wall calendar giving the day as "Meatless Tuesday", a reference to food rationing during World War II. The frustrated spider runs to the United States Capitol and rants to Congress "You can't do this to me! You just can't! You can't! You can't! You can't! You can't!"

== Voice cast ==
- Cy Kendall as Spider (uncredited)
- Mel Blanc as Air Raid Warden, Spider's Yell (uncredited)

== Home media ==
This short is available on the Looney Tunes Collector's Choice: Volume 4 Blu-ray.

== See also ==
- Looney Tunes and Merrie Melodies filmography (1940–1949)
