= The Wacky Worm =

1941 film by Isadore Freleng

- Directed by: Isadore Freleng
- Story by: Dave Monahan
- Produced by: Leon Schlesinger
- Starring: Mel Blanc
- Music by: Carl W. Stalling
- Animation by: Cal Dalton
- Production company: Leon Schlesinger Productions
- Distributed by: Warner Bros. Pictures
- Release date: June 21, 1941
- Running time: 7 min
- Country: United States
- Language: English

The Wacky Worm is a 1941 American animated comedy short film directed by Isadore Freleng. It was released on June 21, 1941. It is part of the Merrie Melodies series. The titular worm would later appear again in Greetings Bait! (1943). It was re-released as a "Blue Ribbon" reissue in 1946, rendering the original film and credits lost.

== Plot ==
A crow searches for food and falls off a small cliff. He finds the titular worm, a caricature of Jerry Colonna, singing in a tree. He begins to chase the worm, who hides in an apple. To the crow's confusion, all dropped apples begin to walk and taunt him. He then hides in a tube of toothpaste then is thrown into a phonograph which stuns the crow while playing music. The crow is then tricked into hitting a can and eating toast from a toaster the worm is hiding in. The worm enters a bottle of alcohol, which makes him drunk and renders him vulnerable to a single strike from the crow. As the worm hides in apples yet again, the crow eats every apple he can find until he becomes full. As the last apple moves, indicating the worm is inside, a woodpecker buries him alive by filling the landscape with more apples. The crow passes out from overeating.

== Home media ==
This short is available on the Looney Tunes Collector's Choice: Volume 2 Blu-ray.
