= Hop, Skip and a Chump =

1942 film by Isadore Freleng

- Directed by: Isadore Freleng
- Story by: Michael Maltese
- Produced by: Leon Schlesinger
- Music by: Carl W. Stalling
- Animation by: Cal Dalton
- Color process: Technicolor
- Production company: Leon Schlesinger Productions
- Distributed by: Warner Bros. Pictures
- Release date: January 3, 1942
- Running time: 7 min
- Country: United States
- Language: English

Hop, Skip and a Chump is a 1942 American animated comedy short film directed by Isadore Freleng. The short was released on January 3, 1942. It is part of the Merrie Melodies series. It was re-released as a "Blue Ribbon" reissue in 1949 as Hop Skip and a Chump, rendering the original film lost. Michael Maltese kept the original title cels.

== Plot ==
A grasshopper named Hoparound Casserole is stalked by two crows resembling Stan Laurel and Oliver Hardy. He does not fear the crows as they are too incompetent to catch him, going as far as to convincing the Laurel crow to beat up the Hardy crow without much effort. He then tricks the Laurel crow into catching a honeybee who stings them angrily even after they hide in a lake.

The Hardy crow gives chase and has the idea to bounce like a grasshopper with springs after finding an abandoned mattress at a landfill. This does lower the grasshopper's guard until they reach a cliff. where the grasshopper stops on time and removes the crow's springs after he rebounds. He then tricks the Laurel crow into falling too.

The crows hide in a broken piano and lure the grasshopper with corn. The grasshopper sees through the trick and plays the piano to whack the crows with the keys. He then hides in a cuckoo clock and whacks the Hardy crow while feigning as a toy intended to ring a bell. Finally realizing their attempts in tricking the grasshopper to be foolish, the crows chase and corner the grasshopper, who escapes into the iris out as a final resort. The crows get the last laugh as the Hardy crow grabs him from the iris out and kills him offscreen.

== Home media ==
It was released on the Looney Tunes Collector's Choice Volume 3 Blu-Ray disc in 2024.
