= The Foxy Duckling =

1947 Warner Bros. cartoon

- Directed by: Arthur Davis
- Story by: George Hill
- Starring: Mel Blanc
- Music by: Carl Stalling
- Animation by: Manny Gould; Don Williams; J.C. Melendez
- Layouts by: Thomas McKimson
- Backgrounds by: Philip DeGuard
- Color process: Technicolor
- Production company: Warner Bros. Cartoons
- Distributed by: Warner Bros. Pictures
- Release date: August 23, 1947 (USA)
- Running time: 7 minutes
- Language: English

The Foxy Duckling is a Warner Bros. Merrie Melodies color cartoon short directed by Arthur Davis, with voices by Mel Blanc and music by Carl Stalling. It was released on August 23, 1947.

== Plot ==
An insomniac fox is having trouble sleeping, and despite his best efforts (tossing and turning, clamping his eyes shut, etc.), he simply cannot fall asleep. He stumbles across a book entitled Insomnia and its Cure, which tells him filling his pillow with duck feathers is essential for a good night's sleep. The next morning, the fox heads out to capture a duck and soon comes across one. The duck, however, proves to be too much for the fox to handle, as he is constantly outsmarted and all his plans to capture him backfire at every turn.

Frustrated, the fox tries one last ditch effort to capture the duck, who is flying just out of his reach. Using many boards and nails, he creates himself a crude wooden bridge to reach him, though the duck outsmarts him yet again by almost-completely sawing off the part of the tree the boards were attached to, leaving it on the verge of collapsing should even the slightest bit of movement be had... and as luck would have it, the bridge is balanced dangerously over a rather large ravine. Though he is frightened, the fox still persists on capturing the duck, who then lets loose one of his feathers onto the wooden bridge... which the extra weight proves to be just enough to cause it to collapse, along with the fox, who falls to his death.

Satisfied, the duck starts to fly away, but he is stopped by the angel spirit of the now-dead fox. Panicked that the fox now has the ability to fly with his newly gained angel wings, the duck quickly takes off into the distance with the fox following closely behind.

== Home media ==
This short is available on the Looney Tunes Collector's Choice: Volume 1 Blu-ray.

== See also ==
- List of films about angels
