= Mr. and Mrs. Is the Name =

1935 film by Isadore Freleng

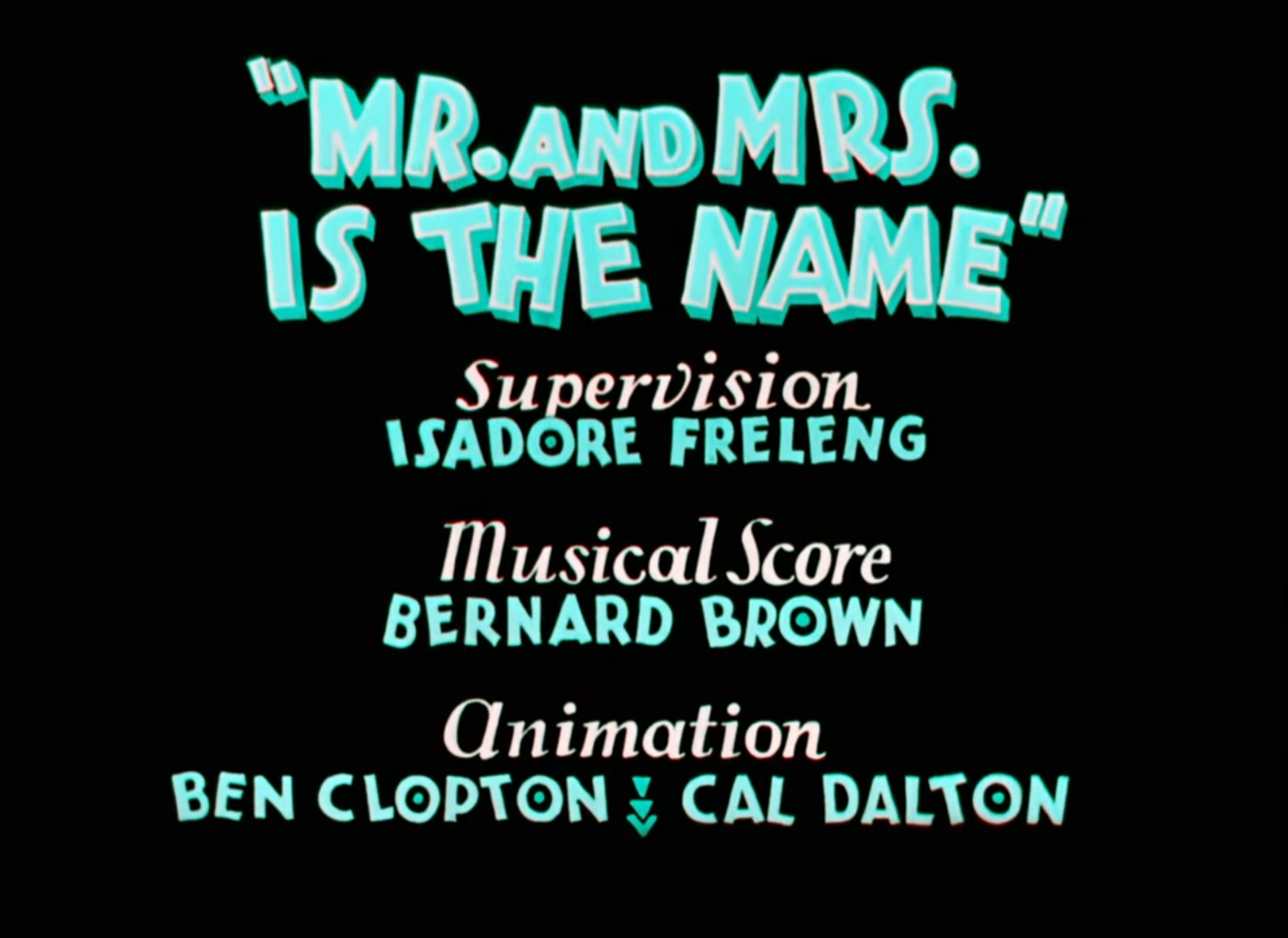
- Title card
- Directed by: Isadore Freleng
- Produced by: Leon Schlesinger
- Starring: Jack Carr; Bernice Hansen
- Music by: Bernard Brown
- Animation by: Ben Clopton; Cal Dalton
- Color process: Technicolor
- Production company: Leon Schlesinger Productions
- Distributed by: Warner Bros. Productions; The Vitaphone Corporation
- Release date: January 19, 1935
- Running time: 7 minutes
- Country: United States
- Language: English

Mr. and Mrs. Is the Name is a 1935 American animated comedy short film directed by Isadore Freleng. The short was released on January 19, 1935. It is the 43rd film in the Merrie Melodies series, featuring the titular song from the film Flirtation Walk, as well as the only appearance of Buddy in the series and in a color cartoon.

== Plot ==
Mermaids sing and dance to the titular song. A young merman who resembles Buddy plays tag with a mermaid resembling Cookie, but she is offended when he accidentally touches her buttocks. Buddy looks inside a sunken ship and drags Cookie to it. She gleefully adorns herself with jewelry she finds in a treasure chest. Meanwhile, Buddy finds some props in another trunk and does an imitation of Charlie Chaplin.

Cookie finds a piano and plays the title song. The noise draws an octopus, who grabs her and swims off, with Buddy in pursuit. The octopus drops Cookie to fight Buddy, and does do so with some success until Buddy lures it into a pipe and ties the octopus' arms to a flange, then starts bashing the octopus with a battering ram. Cookie kisses Buddy; he blushes, then gets hit by the battering ram into her arms.

== Home media ==
The film is available on the Looney Tunes Collector's Choice: Volume 3 Blu-ray.
