= The Cagey Canary =

1941 film by Fred Avery

- Original title card
- Directed by: Fred Avery (uncredited)
- Story by: Michael Maltese
- Produced by: Leon Schlesinger
- Music by: Carl W. Stalling
- Animation by: Bob McKimson
- Color process: Technicolor
- Production company: Leon Schlesinger Productions
- Distributed by: Warner Bros. Pictures
- Release date: November 22, 1941
- Running time: 8 min
- Country: United States
- Language: English

The Cagey Canary is a 1941 American animated comedy short film directed by Fred Avery. The cartoon was released on October 11, 1941. It is part of the Merrie Melodies series. It was one in numerous Avery-directed shorts with post-production finished by Bob Clampett after his departure. The cartoon is a spiritual predecessor to Friz Freleng's Sylvester and Tweety cartoons. It was re-released as a "Blue Ribbon" reissue in 1947, rendering the original film lost.

== Plot ==
A cat attempts to eat a canary in his cage, much to their owner's chagrin. Their owner instructs the canary to punish the cat and notify her by chirping shall the cat attack him again, as she goes to sleep. The cat tries to snatch the canary while he sleeps to no avail. He then holds the cage which wakes the canary up. The canary tricks him into walking out into the rain while he flies out of the cage.

The cat successfully catches the canary by luring him with his tail and containing him in a jar. However, a fly moving to the beat of "Yankee Doodle" causes him to free the canary. The canary shows the cat a picture of a woman, causing the cat to wolf-whistle. The cat tries to stop the canary from chirping by feeding him crackers.

The canary, realizing his freedom, starts to taunt the cat, but does not realize when the cat follows him into the cage. The cat also steps up his game by putting earmuffs on his owner, allowing him to chase the canary around the house. The canary attempts to make noise by turning on appliances. The canary realizes what is happening and removes the earmuffs, causing the cat to run out in fear. However, the canary does not anticipate the consequences of his own actions, as his owner is aware of the commotion and throws him out too. Saddened by their owner's betrayal, the cat and the canary put aside their differences, with the canary asking the audience for a place to stay.

== Home media ==
This short is available on the Looney Tunes Collector's Choice: Volume 4 Blu-ray.
