= Fair and Worm-er =

- Directed by: Charles M. Jones
- Story by: Michael Maltese; Tedd Pierce
- Starring: Mel Blanc
- Narrated by: Robert C. Bruce
- Music by: Carl Stalling
- Animation by: Ben Washam; Ken Harris; Basil Davidovich; Lloyd Vaughan
- Backgrounds by: Robert Gribbroek
- Color process: Technicolor
- Production company: Warner Bros. Cartoons
- Distributed by: Warner Bros. Pictures; The Vitaphone Corporation
- Release date: September 28, 1946 (U.S.)
- Running time: 7 minutes
- Country: United States
- Language: English

Fair and Worm-er is a 1946 Warner Bros. Merrie Melodies cartoon directed by Chuck Jones. The short was released on September 28, 1946.

The title is a pun on Fair and Warmer.

The premise greatly resembles and builds upon that of the 1942 Tex Avery cartoon, The Early Bird Dood It!, which is about a worm chased by a bird chased by a cat, and has a much darker ending.

== Plot ==
After a brief introduction from a narrator, a worm, wielding a knife and fork, rushes to dine on a large apple that has fallen to the ground when he is immediately chased by a hungry black crow. The crow pursues the worm until he is confronted by an equally hungry cat. The cat runs after the crow, only to find himself in the sights of a vicious bulldog. The dog harasses the cat until he is suddenly set upon by the local dog catcher. He is stopped in his tracks by his wife (armed with a rolling pin), who professes that she is not "scared of man nor beast." A nearby mouse informs her that he is a beast and snarls, setting her off running and screaming as the mouse heads off in pursuit of her. Her husband, in a Jimmy Durante voice, watches the woman tearing away, chased by the mouse, and says, "Everybody wants to get into the act."

From there, the five protagonists continue their pursuit of each other—all stemming from the worm still attempting to get the apple. The crow makes an intellectual decision that, within this busy group, he must help the dog. He reasons, "Dogs chase cats...Cats chase birds...I'm a bird...Therefore: I gotta help the dog."

A series of scenarios plays out during which each character goes after their prey while being harried by their own nemesis. An encounter with a skunk, who may or may not be Pepé Le Pew, unites them all in self-preservation and escape. Throughout, the dog catcher's wife continues to run away from the mouse.

At the conclusion of the cartoon, after all of the protagonists hide in a hole to get away from the skunk, the worm dispatches all of them by jabbing them with a tack, scaring them all away. Now free and clear, the narrator asks the worm if he must go through this routine every day just to get something to eat. The worm says, "Eat it, nothing. This is the last furnished apartment in town." He then opens a door in the apple, upon which hangs a "Vacancy" sign. As the short fades out, the worm exits his new home wearing a robe and carrying a towel, heading for a nearby second apple with a door, presumably containing shower facilities.

== Home media ==
This short is available on the Looney Tunes Collector's Choice: Volume 2 Blu-ray.
