= Hobo Bobo =

- Directed by: Robert McKimson
- Story by: Warren Foster
- Narrated by: Robert C. Bruce (uncredited)
- Music by: Carl Stalling
- Animation by: Rod Scribner; Richard Bickenbach; I. Ellis
- Layouts by: Cornett Wood
- Backgrounds by: Richard H. Thomas
- Color process: Technicolor
- Production company: Warner Bros. Cartoons
- Distributed by: Warner Bros. Pictures
- Release date: May 17, 1947
- Running time: 7 minutes
- Country: United States
- Language: English

Hobo Bobo is a 1947 Warner Bros. Merrie Melodies cartoon short directed by Robert McKimson. The short was released on May 17, 1947.

The cartoon stars Robert C. Bruce as the narrator, as well the voice of Stan Freberg.

== Plot ==
Bobo, a baby Indian elephant, sees a dark future for himself if he should remain in India to haul logs with his trunk for the rest of his life. After receiving a letter from his uncle in America, he decides to emigrate there to play on a circus baseball team. After Bobo's attempts to stow away aboard a ship bound for the United States fail repeatedly, he is advised by the mynah bird (better known from the Inki series) to paint himself pink. As seeing pink elephants is the traditional hallucination of the drunkard, neither the captain, the crew nor the passengers will acknowledge seeing Bobo, and thus he has the virtual run of the ship for the entire voyage.

When Bobo finally disembarks in New York City, he is likewise unacknowledged, until a street-cleaning vehicle washes his pink paint off, and the populace panics at the sight of a normal gray baby elephant on the street. The police end up arresting Bobo.

Hauled into court by the police, the judge sentences him to life....at the circus. At the circus, Bobo is promptly engaged by the baseball team as the official batboy. Bobo angrily utters his only line in the film "Batboy, shmatboy! I'm still carrying logs!"

== Home media ==
The film is available on the Looney Tunes Collector's Choice: Volume 3 Blu-ray.

== Later appearance ==
Bobo would appear again as a baseball mascot in Gone Batty, which was also directed by McKimson, and originally released in 1954, and re-released as a Merrie Melodies Blue Ribbon classic in 1963.
