= The Sneezing Weasel =

1938 film by Fred Avery

- Directed by: Fred Avery
- Story by: Cal Howard
- Produced by: Leon Schlesinger
- Starring: Mel Blanc; Fred Avery
- Music by: Carl W. Stalling
- Animation by: Sid Sutherland
- Color process: Technicolor
- Production company: Leon Schlesinger Productions
- Distributed by: Warner Bros. Productions; The Vitaphone Corporation
- Release date: March 12, 1938
- Running time: 7 min
- Country: United States
- Language: English

The Sneezing Weasel is a 1938 American animated comedy short film directed by Fred Avery. The short was released on March 12, 1938. It is the 91st film in the Merrie Melodies series. It was re-released as a "Blue Ribbon" reissue in 1947, rendering the original film and credits to be lost.

== Plot ==
One morning, a rotund hen brings her children to eat their earthworm breakfast, including a brown chick named Wilbur. Wilbur fails to eat the worms that emerge from the soil due to his siblings' interference, including one which escapes as he gives chase. As a storm arrives, the hen uses a calculator to count the chicks due to their rapid movement, only to realize Wilbur's disappearance; she rescues him at the last second as an eccentric weasel nearby spots them.

The hen forces Wilbur to go to sleep for his cold as she leaves the house to fetch a doctor, causing him to be targeted by the weasel. The weasel disguises himself as a doctor, which Wilbur's siblings all fall for, until Wilbur sneezes the glasses off the weasel's head. The chicks go to war with the weasel. The chicks use a minigun fashioned from a pot and popcorn to distract the weasel while Wilbur hides in a hole, where he punches the weasel's nose but is caught again. The chicks shoot the weasel with olives to free Wilbur.

Wilbur manages to infect the weasel with the cold, causing him to sneeze and somehow stop every attempt of retaliation until Wilbur hits him from a cuckoo clock. He uses smelling salts to make the weasel wake up before knocking him out again. The chicks disguise him as Wilbur and hide in the closet as their mother and the doctor arrives. The doctor feeds the weasel castor oil, only for him to leave at the last second. The doctor then feeds Wilbur castor oil to his chagrin, which the weasel mocks until Wilbur knocks him out again from a cuckoo clock.

== Home media ==
This short is available on the Looney Tunes Collector's Choice: Volume 4 Blu-ray.
