= Jack-Wabbit and the Beanstalk =

1943 film by Isadore Freleng

- Title card
- Directed by: Isadore Freleng
- Story by: Michael Maltese
- Produced by: Leon Schlesinger
- Starring: Mel Blanc
- Music by: Carl W. Stalling
- Animation by: Jack Bradbury
- Color process: Technicolor
- Production company: Leon Schlesinger Productions
- Distributed by: Warner Bros. Pictures
- Release date: June 12, 1943
- Running time: 7 min
- Country: United States
- Language: English

Jack-Wabbit and the Beanstalk is a 1943 American animated comedy short film directed by Isadore Freleng. It is part of the Merrie Melodies series and the 21st cartoon to feature Bugs Bunny. It is a parody of the fairy tale Jack and the Beanstalk. Chuck Jones would adapt the fairy tale again in Beanstalk Bunny (1955), another parody of this story starring Bugs Bunny, Daffy Duck, and Elmer Fudd.

== Plot ==
In a twist on Jack and the Beanstalk, Bugs Bunny finds himself in a giant's realm in the sky, where he angers the dim-witted giant by chopping down carrots in his victory garden. Bugs spends the movie evading the giant, even challenging him to a duel. In the end he tricks the giant into falling from the sky-land to earth, leaving a canyon-like hole in the ground from which he delivers the final line: "watch out for that first step, it's a lulu."

== See also ==
- Looney Tunes and Merrie Melodies filmography (1940–1949)
- Bugs Bunny filmography

== Sources ==
- Zipes, Jack (2011). "Filmography". The Enchanted Screen: The Unknown History of Fairy-Tale Films. Routledge. ISBN 978-1135853952.

Preceded by Super-Rabbit	Bugs Bunny Cartoons; 1943	Succeeded by Wackiki Wabbit
