= Streamlined Greta Green =

1937 film by Isadore Freleng

- Directed by: Isadore Freleng
- Produced by: Leon Schlesinger
- Starring: Mel Blanc
- Music by: Carl W. Stalling
- Animation by: Cal Dalton; Ken Harris
- Color process: Technicolor
- Production company: Leon Schlesinger Productions
- Distributed by: Warner Bros. Productions; The Vitaphone Corporation
- Release date: June 19, 1937
- Running time: 8 min
- Country: United States
- Language: English

Streamlined Greta Green is a 1937 American animated comedy short film directed by Isadore Freleng. It was released on June 19, 1937. It is the 76th film in the Merrie Melodies series.

== Plot ==
A bustling street is occupied by anthropomorphic cars. Two cars brawl while a car dances with a taxi at a nightclub, whose taximeter somehow becomes a slot machine which drops out coins.

In the countryside, a young car refuses to go to school and wound up a touring car like his father, instead wanting to be a taxi. He wastes no time to skip school and escape into the city. He is unable to adapt to the traffic on the street until he finds a safety zone and exploits it, only to fall into the sewers.

The car finds a restaurant operated by a human, who reluctantly gives him hi-power fuel, which allows him to speed through the entire city in a second. He races a train, only to be blocked by a road hog, represented literally as a car with a pig's face. The road hog accidentally rides on the bridge's rails while trying to block the car, allowing the car to surpass it. The car risks his life to make several dangerous turns across the tracks before the train passes, only for his gas tank to empty as he makes the third turn, causing him to be run over.

The car is repaired at a garage by mechanics while his mother fears for his life. When his mother threatens to spank him for truancy after he emerges safely, he dodges another train to mock it, only to be run over by another train. He emerges unscathed while somehow destroying the train.

== Home media ==
This short is available on the Looney Tunes Collector's Choice: Volume 4 Blu-ray.

== See also ==
- One Cab's Family - a 1952 Metro Goldwyn Mayer cartoon short similar in content
