= Egghead Rides Again =

1937 film by Fred Avery

- Title card
- Directed by: Fred Avery
- Produced by: Leon Schlesinger
- Starring: Mel Blanc; Tex Avery; Billy Bletcher; Danny Webb; Sons of the Pioneers; Roy Rogers
- Music by: Carl W. Stalling
- Animation by: Paul Smith; Irvin Spence
- Color process: Technicolor
- Production company: Leon Schlesinger Productions
- Distributed by: Warner Bros. Productions; The Vitaphone Corporation
- Release date: July 17, 1937
- Running time: 7 minutes
- Country: United States
- Language: English

Egghead Rides Again is a 1937 American animated comedy short film directed by Fred Avery. It was first released to theaters on July 17, 1937. It is the 78th film in the Merrie Melodies series. The cartoon marks the first appearance of Egghead, a character who would eventually evolve to become Elmer Fudd. It is also the first film to credit Irven Spence, who would become one of the most prominent animators at Metro-Goldwyn-Mayer.

== Plot ==
Wannabe-cowboy Egghead is evicted from his apartment for being a loud nuisance. He finds a newspaper advertisement from a ranch in Wahoo, Wyoming, requesting a cowboy. He literally mails himself to Wyoming for the job. Cowboys at the ranch are horrified to find Egghead inside, but are willing to let him test his skills to see if he is capable of being a cowboy.

The first challenge for Egghead is to shoot a cigarette rolled by one of the cowboy's tongue. The cowboy rolls a pipe to make it easier, but the revolver proves to be too heavy for Egghead, causing him to shoot the cowboy instead. The second challenge is to use a branding iron to brand a pony wrangled by other cowboys, only for Egghead to brand the cowboys instead. The third challenge is to chase the pony from earlier with a horse. The pony tricks Egghead's horse by hiding, but is eventually chased back into the ranch, but it beats up Egghead and ties him up with ease. Humiliated and overwhelmed by the workload of an average cowboy, he is nevertheless given a job of being the ranch's janitor to his chagrin.

== Home media ==
- VHS — Looney Tunes: The Collector's Edition - Vol. 8: Tex-Book Looney
- LaserDisc — The Golden Age of Looney Tunes - Vol. 3
- DVD — Kid Galahad (dubbed version)
- Blu-Ray — Looney Tunes Collector's Choice: Volume 3
