= Quentin Quail =

1946 film by Chuck Jones

- Title card
- Directed by: Charles M. Jones
- Story by: Tedd Pierce
- Music by: Carl W. Stalling
- Animation by: Ben Washam; Ken Harris; Basil Davidovich; Lloyd Vaughan
- Backgrounds by: Robert Gribbroek
- Color process: Technicolor
- Production company: Warner Bros. Cartoons
- Distributed by: Warner Bros. Pictures; The Vitaphone Corporation
- Release date: March 2, 1946
- Running time: 7 minutes
- Language: English

Quentin Quail is a 1946 Warner Bros. Merrie Melodies cartoon directed by Chuck Jones. The short was released on March 2, 1946.

== Plot ==
The film presents a tale about a quail (voiced by Tedd Pierce) who goes through various trials and tribulations to try to get a worm for his baby, Toots (a take-off, voiced by Sara Berner, on Fanny Brice's radio character Baby Snooks), only to have her refuse to eat the worm because it looks like Frank Sinatra (or "Sonata," as she pronounces it).

== Production ==
Prior to the release of this short, the name "Quentin Quail" first appeared on a model sheet by Bob Clampett, done at some point before 1942. The character is a precursor to Clampett's more famous creation, Tweety, and bears a striking resemblance to the canary. Mel Blanc provides Quentin Quail's screams and sneezes, as well as the Crow's voice.

== Home media ==
The film is available on the Looney Tunes Collector's Choice: Volume 3 Blu-ray.
