= Greetings Bait! =

1943 film by Isadore Freleng

- Directed by: Isadore Freleng
- Story by: Tedd Pierce
- Produced by: Leon Schlesinger
- Starring: Mel Blanc
- Music by: Carl W. Stalling
- Animation by: Manuel Perez
- Color process: Technicolor
- Production company: Leon Schlesinger Productions
- Distributed by: Warner Bros. Pictures
- Release date: May 15, 1943
- Running time: 7 min
- Country: United States
- Language: English

Greetings Bait! is a 1943 American animated comedy short film directed by Isadore Freleng. The short was released on May 15, 1943. It is part of the Merrie Melodies series and a sequel to The Wacky Worm, which also features the worm of the same name, a caricature of Jerry Colonna. It was nominated for the 16th Academy Award for Best Short Subject: Cartoons, but lost to the Tom and Jerry cartoon The Yankee Doodle Mouse. It was re-released as a "Blue Ribbon" reissue in 1948 as Greetings Bait, rendering the original film and credits lost.

== Plot ==
A man uses the Wacky Worm as bait; he avoids certain death and helps the man by luring fish into being trapped in a hooked platter. He tricks a dim-witted and unconfident fish into being hooked with a circus trick. As the worm crossdresses and sings to attract a romantic fish, he finds a crab attempting to steal his fish. He ties the crab's eyes on a treasure chest to incapacitate him. They engage in an underwater chase until the worm encourages the crab to remove his shell for a fair fight, which reveals his scrawny body. Despite this, the crab brutally beats the worm to submission offscreen. The worm is lifted to the surface by the man, who is revealed to be Jerry Colonna himself and remarks the situation's embarrassing nature.

== Home media ==
It is available on the Action in the North Atlantic DVD (part of the Humphrey Bogart: The Signature Collection, Vol. 2), and the Looney Tunes Collector's Choice: Volume 2 Blu-ray.
