= Ding Dog Daddy =

1942 film by Isadore Freleng

- Title card
- Directed by: Isadore Freleng
- Written by: Ted Pierce
- Produced by: Leon Schlesinger
- Starring: Mel Blanc; Sara Berner; Pinto Colvig
- Music by: Carl W. Stalling
- Animation by: Gerry Chiniquy
- Color process: Technicolor
- Production company: Leon Schlesinger Productions
- Distributed by: Warner Bros. Pictures
- Release date: December 5, 1942
- Running time: 8 min
- Country: United States
- Language: English

Ding Dog Daddy is a 1942 American animated comedy short film directed by Isadore Freleng. The short was released on December 5, 1942. It is part of the series and is infamous for featuring Pinto Colvig's Goofy-like voice.

== Plot ==
Full video of the short.

After having no luck with the ladies, a dim-witted dog (Pinto Colvig, employing his usual "Goofy" voice) falls in love with "Daisy", a metal statue of a female dog in a garden, failing to realize that "Daisy" is indeed a sculpture. Whenever the dog kisses Daisy, lightning strikes and sends a shock through his system, which he takes as a sign of her passionate love for him. The hero constantly has to contend with a vicious bulldog who is guarding the gate to the garden. After Daisy is carted away in a truck marked "Scrap Metal for Victory" to be melted down (as a contribution to the American effort in World War II), the dog runs frantically to the munitions depot, trying to find Daisy, only to find a bomb labelled "Daisy". As he cries over Daisy's changed appearance, he kisses "Daisy" and the bomb explodes in his face, leading him to obliviously cry out happily.

== Home media ==
This cartoon is available on the Looney Tunes Collector's Choice: Volume 2 Blu-ray.
