= Hiss and Make Up =

1943 film by Isadore Freleng

- Directed by: Isadore Freleng
- Story by: Michael Maltese
- Produced by: Leon Schlesinger
- Starring: Mel Blanc
- Music by: Carl W. Stalling
- Animation by: Gerry Chiniquy
- Color process: Technicolor
- Production company: Leon Schlesinger Productions
- Distributed by: Warner Bros. Pictures
- Release date: September 11, 1943
- Running time: 8 min
- Country: United States
- Language: English

Hiss and Make Up is a 1943 American animated comedy short film directed by Isadore Freleng. It is part of the Merrie Melodies series. It was re-released as a "Blue Ribbon" reissue in 1948, rendering the original film and credits lost, though Michael Maltese kept the original title cel.

== Plot ==
Wellington the cat and Roscoe the dog fight and are reprimanded by their owner, who threatens to throw them into the freezing cold yard if they fight again and forces them to kiss and make up. She watches both animals who attempt to sabotage each other while feigning kindness towards each other. Once their owner goes to bed, their tricks become increasingly creative and destructive. After Roscoe frames Wellington for eating a canary also owned by the same old lady, Wellington frames Roscoe for having rabies with shaving cream. The canary, tired of their antics, then attempts to frame both of them until the old lady decides to kick both Wellington and Roscoe out. Roscoe is confused as to why Wellington smugly accepts his fate while the canary is not punished, only for Wellington to reveal that he caught the canary in his mouth to implicate him.

== Home media ==
This short is available on the Looney Tunes Collector's Choice: Volume 2 Blu-ray.

== See also ==
- Looney Tunes and Merrie Melodies filmography (1940–1949)
