= Saddle Silly =

1941 film by Charles M. Jones

- Title card
- Directed by: Charles M. Jones
- Story by: Rich Hogan (uncredited)
- Produced by: Leon Schlesinger
- Music by: Carl W. Stalling
- Animation by: Philip de Lara
- Color process: Technicolor
- Production company: Leon Schlesinger Productions
- Distributed by: Warner Bros. Pictures
- Release date: November 8, 1941
- Running time: 7 min
- Country: United States
- Language: English

Saddle Silly is a 1941 American animated comedy short film directed by Charles M. Jones. The cartoon was released on November 8, 1941. It is part of the Merrie Melodies series.

== Plot ==
A Pony Express deliveryman traverses terrain in impossible manners. He passes through a foggy mountain peak then has his eyes covered by his cap. He returns to the base to switch to another horse while the original horse rests. While trying to reach a hitchhiker, he accidentally falls deep into the water, walks his way out but then plunges into the deep again. His horse halts after noticing the hitchhiker, causing the deliveryman to accelerate on thin air. He realizes his mistake and returns to his horse without falling. He enters Indian territory, where a Native American chief living in his Westernized hut gives chase on a much faster horse. As the road is blocked, the deliveryman forces the horse to act as a barrier against his wishes. He reaches his destination, a fort, just in time before the North American manages to enter it. To the horror of the deliveryman and the general receiving the package, the hitchhiker emerges after usurping the package's unknown contents, thanking the deliveryman for the ride.

== Home media ==
It was released on the Looney Tunes Collector's Choice Volume 3 Blu-Ray disc in 2024.
