= Brother Brat =

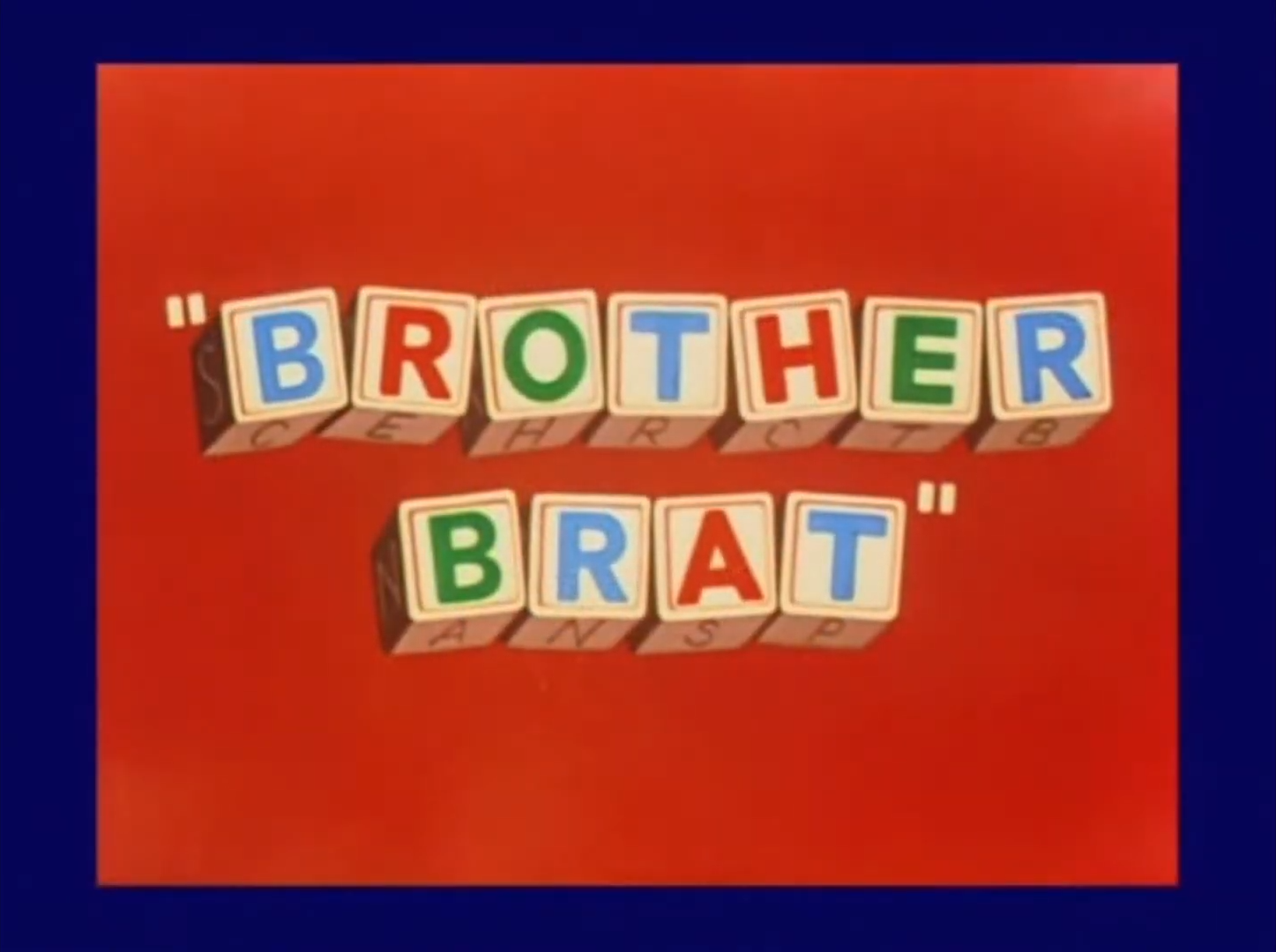
- Title card
- Directed by: Frank Tashlin
- Story by: Melvin Millar
- Produced by: Leon Schlesinger
- Starring: Mel Blanc
- Narrated by: Robert C. Bruce
- Music by: Carl W. Stalling
- Animation by: Art Davis
- Color process: Technicolor
- Production company: Leon Schlesinger Productions
- Distributed by: Warner Bros. Pictures
- Release date: July 15, 1944
- Running time: 7 minutes
- Country: United States
- Language: English

Brother Brat is a 1944 Warner Bros. Looney Tunes theatrical cartoon short, directed by Frank Tashlin. It was released on July 15, 1944, and stars Porky Pig.

== Plot ==
When a mother goes to work in a factory during World War II, Porky Pig is hired to baby-sit her son, Butch. He quickly finds out that the baby is a violent-tempered infant, named Percy (nicknamed Butch). He tries to use a child psychology book to control the baby, but to no avail, including a scene where the baby does a Winston Churchill impression; "Of course you know, this means war!" Then Butch breaks the fourth wall, holding up a backwards V sign, holding a cigar in it, and says in Churchill's voice, "We will fight until Hitler and his Nazi gangsters suffer disastrous, overwhelming, and complete defeat." Eventually, at the end of the cartoon, the mother returns and asks Porky if he used the book. He then replies that the book did not work, but the mother says that he didn't use it right and then uses the book to spank the baby.

== Home media ==
This short is available on the Looney Tunes Collector's Choice: Volume 2 Blu-ray.

== See also ==
- Porky Pig filmography
- Looney Tunes and Merrie Melodies filmography (1940–1949)

Preceded by Confusions of a Nutzy Spy	Porky Pig Cartoons; 1944	Succeeded by Swooner Crooner
