= The Sheepish Wolf =

1942 film by Isadore Freleng

- Original title card
- Directed by: Isadore Freleng
- Story by: Michael Maltese
- Produced by: Leon Schlesinger
- Starring: Mel Blanc
- Music by: Carl W. Stalling
- Animation by: Gil Turner
- Color process: Technicolor
- Production company: Leon Schlesinger Productions
- Distributed by: Warner Bros. Pictures
- Release date: October 17, 1942
- Running time: 7 min
- Country: United States
- Language: English

The Sheepish Wolf is a 1942 American animated comedy short film directed by Isadore Freleng. It was released on October 17, 1942. It is part of the Merrie Melodies series. It is a spiritual predecessor to cartoons starring Ralph Wolf and Sam Sheepdog. It was re-released as a "Blue Ribbon" reissue in 1949, rendering the original film lost, though Michael Maltese kept the title and credits cels.

The film

== Plot ==
A sheepdog watches sheep while a wolf wants to eat the sheep. He decides to dress up in sheep's clothing and lure the sheep. The wolf inadvertently attracts the sheepdog, who is still fooled by his disguise and orders him to stay in the flock. A black sheep notices the truth and notifies the sheepdog. The sheepdog proceeds to sound a horn to make a wolf's mating sound, which reveals the wolf's presence.

The wolf returns home and dresses up as Little Red Riding Hood's grandmother, which spurs the sheepdog to dress up as Red herself, but wounds up being tricked into allowing the wolf's getaway. They then chase each other into a hay bale-making machine until the wolf is defeated. To the sheepdog's horror, the sheep reveal themselves to be wolves in more advanced disguises, who had eaten all of the actual sheep before the film's events.
