= Double Chaser =

1942 film by Isadore Freleng

- Title card
- Directed by: Isadore Freleng
- Story by: Michael Maltese
- Produced by: Leon Schlesinger
- Starring: Mel Blanc
- Music by: Carl W. Stalling
- Animation by: Gerry Chiniquy
- Color process: Technicolor
- Production company: Leon Schlesinger Productions
- Distributed by: Warner Bros. Pictures
- Release date: June 27, 1942
- Running time: 6 min
- Country: United States
- Language: English

Double Chaser is a 1942 American animated comedy short film directed by Isadore Freleng. It was released on June 27, 1942. It is part of the Merrie Melodies series. It was re-released as a "Blue Ribbon" reissue in 1950, rendering the original film lost, though Michael Maltese kept the title card.

== Plot ==
A cat uses cheese to lure a mouse who escapes on time. The mouse runs on a sleeping bulldog, which he uses to his advantage by scaring the cat into abandoning his cheese bait, which works until the bulldog wakes up and leaves. The mouse escapes into a hole and somehow brings the bulldog inside, who is enraged once the cat digs him up.

The cat and mouse hide, with the mouse finding his way into an egg. The cat pretends to be a hen, which fools the bulldog. The cat is convinced he is a hen and the mouse is convinced he is a chick until they spot each other. The bulldog finds the actual hen and starts another chase. This continues until the mouse accidentally causes the bulldog to run into a cuckoo clock. Earning the ire of the bulldog too, the mouse makes a "bomb" out of an apple, which somehow manages to explode and kill him.
