= List of Warner Bros. cartoons with Blue Ribbon reissues =

This is a comprehensive list of Looney Tunes and Merrie Melodies shorts that were given Blue Ribbon reissues by Warner Bros. Cartoons between 1943 and 1969.

== Background ==
The Blue Ribbon program was initiated in late 1943 as a way to cut costs for producing cartoons during World War II, and later as a way to compete against the growing popularity of television. Through the reissue seasons, the reissues had a given season's opening rings and the "Merrily We Roll Along" theme (1941–45 rendition or 1945–55 rendition; this depends on the original audio and when it is played) followed by a title card which showed a blue ribbon (hence the program's title) and a Grand Shorts Award trophy. The closing title cards, for the most part, were replaced too, with some exceptions.

The Blue Ribbon titles were edited into the cartoon's original negative. For the first 13 years of the program (1943–1956 re-releases), the credits were also scrapped. However, later re-releases (from 1956 to 1964) kept them. The gap between the keeping and splitting of the credits would determine which cartoons were sold to Associated Artists Productions in 1956, with some exceptions (see below). Only Merrie Melodies and Looney Tunes cartoons made in color were eligible for this program.

A Feud There Was was the first cartoon to be re-released with Blue Ribbon titles on September 11, 1943, scrapping the original titles. It was later re-released again on September 13, 1952, scrapping the first re-release's Blue Ribbon titles.

Though some have had their original bullet title sequences and credits restored for official Looney Tunes DVD and Blu-ray releases, as well as HBO Max and MeTV, the majority of the re-releases still have the Blue Ribbon credits. In addition, most Blue Ribbon prints of the short, usually through the American and European 1995 Turner prints, can be seen on television packages throughout the world. Some of them, like A Wild Hare, have edited lines, although the original unedited version is present on The Golden Age of Looney Tunes, Volume 4, Side 1, the Warner Bros. Home Entertainment Academy Awards Animation Collection, Disc 2, The Essential Bugs Bunny, Disc 1, the Looney Tunes Platinum Collection: Volume 2, Disc 1, and the Bugs Bunny 80th Anniversary Collection, Disc 1. Also, several Blue Ribbon prints have altered titles. For example, A Wild Hare is titled The Wild Hare, My Little Buckaroo is titled My Little Buckeroo, and The Fella with the Fiddle is titled The Fella with a Fiddle. In addition to A Feud There Was, instead of re-releasing other shorts into the Blue Ribbon program, seven other Blue Ribbon shorts have been re-released twice, scrapping the first re-release titles. They are, The Cat Came Back (1944 and 1954), Of Fox and Hounds, (1944 and 1954), The Fighting 69½th (1943 and 1953), The Early Worm Gets the Bird (1943 and 1952), Rhapsody in Rivets (1947 and 1954), The Trial of Mr. Wolf (1946 and 1954), and Old Glory (1945 and 1953). The first reissued versions of these films remain lost. Starting with the 1947–48 animation season reissues, custom fonts for titles were used. Dangerous Dan McFoo was the first cartoon to use this.

After the sale of copyrights of the pre-August 1948 cartoons to Associated Artists Productions in 1956, Warner Bros. Cartoons would start to keep the original credits on Blue Ribbon reissues, in an attempt to save more money. These re-releases replaced the original opening cards with the animation season the cartoon was re-released in, then proceeded to the original credits through a cut instead of a fade in (they were edited into the original negative). These releases between 1956 and 1964 kept the original opening and ending music, regardless of what series the cartoon was originally in. In addition, re-releases between 1956 and 1959 always kept the original closing title cards, regardless what series the cartoon was originally in. But from 1959 to 1964, for the most part, the original closing title card was replaced with the reissue season's ending title card.

For the Looney Tunes Golden Collection, Super Stars, Platinum Collection, Mouse Chronicles, Collector's Choice, and Collector's Vault DVD and Blu-ray releases, Warner Bros. went to great lengths to track down whatever elements of the original title credits still exist in an effort to re-create as best they could the original versions of the altered "Blue Ribbon" shorts. Some pristine prints of the original issues were obtained from the UCLA Film and Television Archive. As a result, such cartoons as I Love to Singa and Book Revue can once again be seen as they were originally intended. Unfortunately, there are some "Blue Ribbon" reissue versions of cartoons that are represented on the Golden Collection, Super Stars, Platinum Collection, Mouse Chronicles, Collector's Choice and Collector's Vault DVDs and Blu-rays as they are the only versions that were made available for exhibition. In any event, to this day there is controversy among animation fans and historians on the alteration of the "Blue Ribbon" releases, primarily the ones re-released between 1943 and 1956.

=== Exceptions ===
The 1940 cartoon Mighty Hunters was the one exception to the original rule. The 1952–53 opening rings and "Blue Ribbon" title card were shown as normal, but then proceeded to the original technical credits. This was the only cartoon which ended up in the a.a.p. package (released prior to August 1, 1948) to be reissued under the 1956–57 (and later) rules.

On the other hand, five cartoons which Warner Bros. would keep for their own television packages, because these shorts were released after July 31, 1948, were re-released under the original 1943 rules (the technical credits are removed). These were: You Were Never Duckier, The Foghorn Leghorn, Daffy Dilly, Kit for Cat, and Scaredy Cat. You Were Never Duckier was reissued in the 1954–55 season, while the others were reissued during the 1955–56 season. Daffy Dilly was originally produced in Cinecolor, while the rest were produced in Technicolor. Also, Daffy Dilly is the only one of the five to have its original titles not present on DVD or Blu-ray releases due to its presence in a 16mm film print. The Foghorn Leghorn is the only one of the five to be directed by Robert McKimson and Kit for Cat is the only one of the five to be directed by Friz Freleng. The other three were directed by Chuck Jones.

Notably, Bugs Bunny cartoons were often excluded from being reissued. This was due to those cartoons being billed as Bugs Bunny Specials, a sub-series which Warner Bros. sold to theaters at a higher price. They also allowed theaters to book these cartoons separately if they wanted. Very few cartoons featuring the character were actually reissued under the program: only 23 cartoons in total were reissued, and only Prest-O Change-O, A Wild Hare and Hiawatha's Rabbit Hunt were reissued under the 1943–1956 rules (i.e. titles & credits removed). The other 20 still keep both their technical credits and (with the exceptions of Hot Cross Bunny, Knights Must Fall, Rabbit Hood, and Homeless Hare) the Bugs Bunny/Bugs Bunny in card as well. However, following the shutdown of the original studio, several Bugs Bunny cartoons were reissued from 1964 to 1969 due to providing a high box office value for a low cost.

Cartoons with re-releases in the last few years of the program (past August 1964) did not have new titles. Instead, they were re-released with their original titles, or for the case of any cartoon reissued beforehand, their first reissue titles, due to low budgets from DePatie–Freleng Enterprises and Warner Bros.-Seven Arts.

== Reissued cartoons ==
A total of 323 cartoons were reissued through the Blue Ribbon program.

Title	Original release date	Original series	Reissue release date
The Country Mouse	1935-07-13	MM	1953-03-14
The Merry Old Soul	1935-08-17	MM	1952-08-02
The Lady in Red	1935-09-07	MM	1951-10-13
The Little Dutch Plate	1935-10-19	MM	1953-04-11
Flowers for Madame	1935-11-30	MM	1951-02-03
The Cat Came Back	1936-02-08	MM	1944-07-15, 1954-06-05
I'm a Big Shot Now	1936-04-11	MM	1945-06-04
Let It Be Me	1936-05-09	MM	1944-09-16
When I Yoo Hoo	1936-06-27	MM	1945-02-24
I Love to Singa	1936-07-18	MM	1944-11-18
Sunday Go to Meetin' Time	1936-08-13	MM	1944-10-27
Don't Look Now	1936-11-07	MM	1948-04-10
He Was Her Man	1937-01-02	MM	1949-04-02
Pigs Is Pigs	1937-01-30	MM	1947-02-22
I Only Have Eyes for You	1937-03-06	MM	1945-03-17
The Fella with the Fiddle	1937-03-27	MM	1945-01-20
Ain't We Got Fun	1937-05-01	MM	1945-04-21
Sweet Sioux	1937-07-03	MM	1944-04-08
Plenty of Money and You	1937-07-31	MM	1944-12-09
A Sunbonnet Blue	1937-08-21	MM	1945-11-17
Speaking of the Weather	1937-09-04	MM	1945-07-21
I Wanna Be a Sailor	1937-09-25	MM	1949-04-30
The Lyin' Mouse	1937-10-16	MM	1945-12-22
Little Red Walking Hood	1937-11-06	MM	1946-08-17
September in the Rain	1937-12-18	MM	1944-09-30
Daffy Duck & Egghead	1938-01-01	MM	1946-04-20
My Little Buckaroo	1938-01-29	MM	1943-11-06
The Sneezing Weasel	1938-03-12	MM	1947-07-26
Now That Summer is Gone	1938-05-14	MM	1947-11-22
The Isle of Pingo Pongo	1938-05-28	MM	1944-08-19
Katnip Kollege	1938-06-11	MM	1945-10-20
Have You Got Any Castles?	1938-06-25	MM	1947-02-01
A Feud There Was	1938-09-24	MM	1943-09-11, 1952-09-13
Little Pancho Vanilla	1938-10-08	MM	1948-03-20
Johnny Smith and Poker-Huntas	1938-10-22	MM	1946-06-22
You're an Education	1938-11-05	MM	1946-10-26
The Night Watchman	1938-11-19	MM	1946-05-18
The Mice Will Play	1938-12-31	MM	1949-08-06
Dog Gone Modern	1939-01-14	MM	1947-06-14
Robin Hood Makes Good	1939-02-11	MM	1946-07-06
A Day at the Zoo	1939-03-11	MM	1952-11-08
Prest-O Change-O	1939-03-25	MM	1949-02-05
Thugs with Dirty Mugs	1939-05-06	MM	1944-06-03
Hobo Gadget Band	1939-05-27	MM	1948-02-14
Old Glory	1939-07-01	MM	1945-08-25, 1953-09-12
Dangerous Dan McFoo	1939-07-15	MM	1948-01-31
Little Brother Rat	1939-09-02	MM	1946-06-08
Sioux Me	1939-09-09	MM	1951-07-21
Little Lion Hunter	1939-10-07	MM	1946-03-23
The Good Egg	1939-10-21	MM	1946-01-05
Fresh Fish	1939-11-04	MM	1946-04-06
Fagin's Freshmen	1939-11-18	MM	1950-09-16
Sniffles and the Bookworm	1939-12-02	MM	1951-11-10
The Curious Puppy	1939-12-30	MM	1948-04-24
The Early Worm Gets the Bird	1940-01-13	MM	1943-10-02, 1952-11-29
Mighty Hunters	1940-01-27	MM	1953-06-13
Busy Bakers	1940-02-10	MM	1945-10-20
Cross Country Detours	1940-03-16	MM	1944-01-15
The Bear's Tale	1940-04-13	MM	1944-03-11
Sniffles Takes a Trip	1940-05-11	MM	1953-08-01
Tom Thumb in Trouble	1940-06-08	MM	1949-09-24
Circus Today	1940-06-22	MM	1948-05-22
Little Blabbermouse	1940-07-06	MM	1948-06-12
The Egg Collector	1940-07-20	MM	1949-07-16
A Wild Hare	1940-07-27	MM	1944-06-17
Stage Fright	1940-09-28	MM	1951-06-23
Wacky Wild Life	1940-11-09	MM	1953-08-29
Bedtime for Sniffles	1940-11-23	MM	1949-01-01
Of Fox and Hounds	1940-12-07	MM	1944-05-13, 1954-02-06
The Fighting 69th½	1941-01-18	MM	1943-12-04, 1953-07-11
Sniffles Bells the Cat	1941-02-01	MM	1947-09-20
The Cat's Tale	1941-03-01	MM	1947-03-29
Goofy Groceries	1941-03-29	MM	1947-04-19
Toy Trouble	1941-04-12	MM	1949-12-31
The Trial of Mr. Wolf	1941-04-26	MM	1946-02-09, 1954-12-25
Farm Frolics	1941-05-10	MM	1949-10-15
Hollywood Steps Out	1941-05-24	MM	1948-10-02
Hiawatha's Rabbit Hunt	1941-06-07	MM	1944-02-12
The Wacky Worm	1941-06-21	MM	1946-10-12
Inki and the Lion	1941-07-19	MM	1950-05-20
Snow Time for Comedy	1941-08-30	MM	1952-04-12
The Brave Little Bat	1941-09-27	MM	1952-03-15
The Bug Parade	1941-10-11	MM	1952-07-12
The Cagey Canary	1941-11-22	MM	1947-10-11
Rhapsody in Rivets	1941-12-06	MM	1947-08-16, 1954-09-11
Hop, Skip and a Chump	1942-01-03	MM	1949-03-05
Horton Hatches the Egg	1942-04-11	MM	1946-05-04
Double Chaser	1942-06-27	MM	1950-03-25
The Squawkin' Hawk	1942-08-08	MM	1948-07-10
Fox Pop	1942-09-05	MM	1946-09-28
The Hep Cat	1942-10-03	LT	1949-11-12
The Sheepish Wolf	1942-10-17	MM	1950-03-04
A Tale of Two Kitties	1942-11-21	MM	1948-07-31
My Favorite Duck	1942-12-05	LT	1950-01-28
Pigs in a Polka	1943-02-06	MM	1948-08-14
The Fifth-Column Mouse	1943-03-06	MM	1950-04-22
Flop Goes the Weasel	1943-03-20	MM	1949-05-21
The Unbearable Bear	1943-04-17	MM	1950-12-09
Greetings Bait!	1943-05-15	MM	1948-08-28
The Aristo Cat	1943-06-19	MM	1950-11-11
Hiss and Make Up	1943-09-11	MM	1948-09-18
Fin 'n' Catty	1943-10-23	MM	1948-12-11
Inki and the Minah Bird	1943-11-13	MM	1949-08-20
An Itch in Time	1943-12-04	MM	1948-10-30
Tick Tock Tuckered	1944-04-08	LT	1950-06-03
The Swooner Crooner	1944-05-06	LT	1949-02-12
Duck Soup to Nuts	1944-05-27	LT	1951-01-06
Slightly Daffy	1944-06-17	MM	1950-10-14
From Hand to Mouse	1944-08-05	LT	1952-02-09
Goldilocks and the Jivin' Bears	1944-09-02	MM	1951-12-01
Lost and Foundling	1944-09-30	MM	1950-08-26
Booby Hatched	1944-10-14	LT	1950-07-01
The Stupid Cupid	1944-11-25	LT	1951-09-01
Odor-able Kitty	1945-01-06	LT	1951-04-21
Trap Happy Porky	1945-02-24	LT	1950-08-05
Life with Feathers	1945-03-24	MM	1951-03-03
Ain't That Ducky	1945-05-19	LT	1953-05-02
Tale of Two Mice	1945-06-30	LT	1953-01-10
Fresh Airedale	1945-08-25	MM	1952-08-30
The Bashful Buzzard	1945-09-15	LT	1953-02-07
Peck Up Your Troubles	1945-10-20	MM	1951-03-24
Book Revue	1946-01-05	LT	1951-05-19
Holiday for Shoestrings	1946-02-23	MM	1951-09-15
Baby Bottleneck	1946-03-16	LT	1952-06-14
Daffy Doodles	1946-04-06	LT	1952-10-11
Hush My Mouse	1946-05-04	LT	1952-05-03
Eager Beaver	1946-07-13	MM	1953-11-28
Of Thee I Sting	1946-08-17	LT	1952-01-12
Walky Talky Hawky	1946-08-31	MM	1953-10-17
Fair and Worm-er	1946-09-28	MM	1955-11-05
The Mouse-Merized Cat	1946-10-19	MM	1955-11-26
Mouse Menace	1946-11-02	LT	1954-08-14
Roughly Squeaking	1946-11-23	LT	1954-02-27
One Meat Brawl	1947-01-18	MM	1954-07-10
Goofy Gophers	1947-01-25	LT	1955-07-23
The Gay Anties	1947-02-15	MM	1954-04-24
Scent-imental Over You	1947-03-08	LT	1953-12-26
Birth of a Notion	1947-04-12	LT	1953-11-07
Tweetie Pie	1947-05-03	MM	1955-06-25
Hobo Bobo	1947-05-17	MM	1954-04-03
Along Came Daffy	1947-06-14	LT	1954-07-24
Inki at the Circus	1947-06-21	MM	1954-10-16
Crowing Pains	1947-07-12	LT	1955-04-23
The Foxy Duckling	1947-08-23	MM	1954-11-06
House Hunting Mice	1947-09-06	LT	1955-04-02
Little Orphan Airedale	1947-10-04	LT	1956-08-04
Doggone Cats	1947-10-25	MM	1955-09-10
A Horse Fly Fleas	1947-12-13	LT	1956-07-07
Two Gophers from Texas	1948-01-17	MM	1956-03-31
What's Brewin', Bruin?	1948-02-26	LT	1955-08-20
Back Alley Oproar	1948-03-27	MM	1955-02-05
I Taw a Putty Tat	1948-04-02	MM	1956-02-25
Hop, Look and Listen	1948-04-17	LT	1955-06-04
Bone Sweet Bone	1948-05-22	MM	1956-01-21
The Rattled Rooster	1948-06-26	LT	1955-10-22
The Shell Shocked Egg	1948-07-10	MM	1954-11-27
You Were Never Duckier	1948-08-07	MM	1955-02-26
Hot Cross Bunny	1948-08-21	MM	1959-11-21
The Pest That Came to Dinner	1948-09-11	LT	1957-12-07
Hare Splitter	1948-09-25	MM	1957-09-07
The Foghorn Leghorn	1948-10-09	MM	1955-12-24
Daffy Dilly	1948-10-30	MM	1956-08-18
Kit for Cat	1948-11-06	LT	1956-04-21
My Bunny Lies over the Sea	1948-12-04	MM	1959-02-21
Scaredy Cat	1948-12-18	MM	1956-06-02
Wise Quackers	1949-01-01	LT	1958-10-25
Awful Orphan	1949-01-29	MM	1958-07-12
Mississippi Hare	1949-02-26	LT	1958-02-15
Paying the Piper	1949-03-12	LT	1956-10-20
Daffy Duck Hunt	1949-03-26	LT	1956-11-17
Rebel Rabbit	1949-04-09	MM	1958-08-09
Mouse Wreckers	1949-04-23	LT	1957-03-09
High Diving Hare	1949-04-30	LT	1959-07-25
The Bee-Deviled Bruin	1949-05-14	MM	1959-07-11
Bowery Bugs	1949-06-04	MM	1958-09-16
Knights Must Fall	1949-07-16	MM	1967-10-28
Mouse Mazurka	1949-06-11	MM	1956-09-15
Henhouse Henery	1949-07-02	LT	1956-12-01
Bad Ol' Putty Tat	1949-07-23	MM	1957-06-29
The Grey Hounded Hare	1949-08-06	LT	1961-10-28
Often an Orphan	1949-08-13	MM	1959-10-03
Dough for the Do-Do	1949-09-03	MM	1957-04-06
Fast and Furry-ous	1949-09-17	LT	1957-04-27, 1969-09-13
Each Dawn I Crow	1949-09-24	MM	1957-06-15
Swallow the Leader	1949-10-15	LT	1957-01-19
Bye, Bye Bluebeard	1949-10-22	MM	1962-05-19
For Scent-imental Reasons	1949-11-12	LT	1957-02-02
Hippety Hopper	1949-11-19	MM	1957-08-24
Bear Feat	1949-12-10	LT	1957-05-18
Rabbit Hood	1949-12-24	MM	1962-03-17
A Ham in a Role	1949-12-31	LT	1960-08-27
Home Tweet Home	1950-01-14	MM	1958-01-25
Hurdy-Gurdy Hare	1950-01-21	MM	1962-09-08
Boobs in the Woods	1950-01-28	LT	1959-06-20
Mutiny on the Bunny	1950-02-11	LT	1968-01-20
The Lion's Busy	1950-02-18	LT	1961-05-13
The Scarlet Pumpernickel	1950-03-04	LT	1958-05-17
Homeless Hare	1950-03-11	MM	1962-06-16
Strife with Father	1950-04-01	MM	1961-09-30
The Hypo-Chondri-Cat	1950-04-15	MM	1957-12-28
The Leghorn Blows at Midnight	1950-05-06	LT	1957-11-02
His Bitter Half	1950-05-20	MM	1957-10-19
An Egg Scramble	1950-05-27	MM	1958-10-04
All a Bir-r-r-d	1950-06-24	LT	1958-06-14
8 Ball Bunny	1950-07-08	LT	1962-11-24
It's Hummer Time	1950-07-22	LT	1958-03-22
Golden Yeggs	1950-08-05	MM	1959-03-14
Dog Gone South	1950-08-26	MM	1959-08-22
The Ducksters	1950-09-02	LT	1960-06-18
A Fractured Leghorn	1950-09-16	MM	1958-04-19
Canary Row	1950-10-07	MM	1958-12-13
Stooge for a Mouse	1950-10-21	MM	1958-08-30
Pop 'im Pop!	1950-10-28	LT	1957-09-21
Caveman Inki	1950-11-25	LT	1958-03-01
Dog Collared	1950-12-02	MM	1959-01-03
Rabbit of Seville	1950-12-16	LT	1969-01-18
Two's a Crowd	1950-12-30	LT	1958-11-22
A Fox in a Fix	1951-01-20	MM	1959-01-31
Canned Feud	1951-02-03	LT	1959-05-02
Putty Tat Trouble	1951-02-24	LT	1959-10-24
Corn Plastered	1951-03-03	MM	1961-07-01
Bunny Hugged	1951-03-10	MM	1961-01-28
Scent-imental Romeo	1951-03-24	MM	1959-04-11
A Bone for a Bone	1951-04-07	LT	1960-01-02
A Hound for Trouble	1951-04-28	MM	1961-09-09
Early to Bet	1951-05-12	MM	1959-05-30
Rabbit Fire	1951-05-19	LT	1961-04-08
Room and Bird	1951-06-02	MM	1960-09-10
Chow Hound	1951-06-16	LT	1960-07-09
French Rarebit	1951-06-30	MM	1960-08-06
The Wearing of the Grin	1951-07-14	MM	1961-02-18
Leghorn Swoggled	1951-07-28	MM	1961-11-25
His Hare-Raising Tale	1951-08-11	LT	1960-10-22
Cheese Chasers	1951-08-25	MM	1960-04-30
Lovelorn Leghorn	1951-09-08	LT	1960-03-12
Tweety's S.O.S.	1951-09-22	MM	1960-02-20
Ballot Box Bunny	1951-10-06	MM	1961-08-26
A Bear for Punishment	1951-10-20	LT	1959-12-12
Sleepy Time Possum	1951-11-03	MM	1960-04-09
Drip-Along Daffy	1951-11-17	MM	1959-09-12
Big Top Bunny	1951-12-01	MM	1963-08-24
Tweet Tweet Tweety	1951-12-15	LT	1960-12-31
The Prize Pest	1951-12-22	LT	1960-01-30
Who's Kitten Who?	1952-01-05	LT	1960-05-21
Feed the Kitty	1952-02-02	MM	1961-04-29
Gift Wrapped	1952-02-16	LT	1960-11-19, May 1966
Thumb Fun	1952-03-01	LT	1961-06-10
Little Beau Pepé	1952-03-29	MM	1960-12-10
Kiddin' the Kitten	1952-04-05	MM	1961-08-05
Sock a Doodle Do	1952-05-10	LT	1962-02-17
Beep, Beep	1952-05-24	MM	1961-03-11
Ain't She Tweet	1952-06-21	LT	1962-04-14
Cracked Quack	1952-07-05	MM	1960-10-01
Hoppy-Go-Lucky	1952-08-09	LT	1968-03-16
A Bird in a Guilty Cage	1952-08-30	LT	1962-07-14
Fool Coverage	1952-12-13	LT	1962-08-11
Don't Give Up the Sheep	1953-01-03	LT	1969-03-22
Snow Business	1953-01-17	LT	December 1965
Forward March Hare	1953-02-14	LT	1969-05-24
Upswept Hare	1953-03-14	MM	1963-05-25
A Peck o' Trouble	1953-03-28	LT	1961-12-23
Fowl Weather	1953-04-04	MM	1962-10-27
Muscle Tussle	1953-04-18	MM	1962-09-29
Southern Fried Rabbit	1953-05-02	LT	1969-07-12
Tom Tom Tomcat	1953-06-27	MM	1962-01-27
Cat-Tails for Two	1953-08-29	MM	1963-02-16
Zipping Along	1953-09-19	MM	1969-11-15
Easy Peckin's	1953-10-17	LT	1963-03-16
Of Rice and Hen	1953-11-14	LT	1969-02-15
Dog Pounded	1954-01-02	LT	1963-01-26
Captain Hareblower	1954-01-16	MM	1969-10-11
No Barking	1954-02-27	MM	1963-04-13
Design for Leaving	1954-03-27	LT	1962-12-22
Bell Hoppy	1954-04-17	LT	1963-06-15
Satan's Waitin'	1954-08-07	LT	1963-07-24
Gone Batty	1954-09-04	LT	October 1963
By Word of Mouse	1954-10-02	LT	June 1965
From A to Z-Z-Z-Z	1954-10-16	LT	1963-11-16
Quack Shot	1954-10-30	MM	1969-07-19
Pests for Guests	1955-01-29	MM	1964-05-30
All Fowled Up	1955-02-19	LT	1969-08-02
Lighthouse Mouse	1955-03-12	MM	1967-12-16
The Hole Idea	1955-04-16	LT	April 1965
A Kiddies Kitty	1955-08-20	MM	1964-08-15
Heir-Conditioned	1955-11-26	LT	September 1964
One Froggy Evening	1955-12-31	MM	1969-12-06
Too Hop to Handle	1956-01-26	LT	January 1965
Weasel Stop	1956-02-11	MM	1964-01-25
The High and the Flighty	1956-02-18	MM	April 1964
Broom-Stick Bunny	1956-02-25	LT	September 1964
Heaven Scent	1956-03-31	MM	December 1964
Rabbitson Crusoe	1956-04-28	LT	January 1965
Gee Whiz-z-z-z-z-z-z	1956-05-05	LT	1969-12-27
Tree Cornered Tweety	1956-05-19	MM	November 1964
The Unexpected Pest	1956-06-02	MM	August 1965
Napoleon Bunny-Part	1956-06-16	MM	May 1965
Rocket-Bye Baby	1956-08-04	MM	October 1964
Half-Fare Hare	1956-08-18	MM	July 1965
Raw! Raw! Rooster!	1956-08-25	LT	July 1964
Yankee Dood It	1956-10-13	MM	1963-09-14
Wideo Wabbit	1956-10-27	MM	November 1965
To Hare Is Human	1956-12-15	MM	December 1966
Tweet Zoo	1957-01-12	MM	1963-12-21
Cheese It, the Cat!	1957-05-04	LT	1969-09-27
Fox-Terror	1957-05-11	MM	1964-08-29
Piker's Peak	1957-05-25	LT	June 1966
Steal Wool	1957-06-08	LT	1969-08-30
Boston Quackie	1957-06-22	LT	1969-10-25
Tabasco Road	1957-07-20	LT	1964-02-15
Birds Anonymous	1957-08-10	MM	June 1964
Zoom and Bored	1957-09-14	MM	March 1965
Greedy for Tweety	1957-09-28	LT	March 1964
Gonzales' Tamales	1957-11-30	LT	1968-07-10
Rabbit Romeo	1957-12-14	MM	July 1967
Hare-Less Wolf	1958-02-01	MM	October 1966
Hare-Way to the Stars	1958-03-29	LT	1968-06-08
Now, Hare This	1958-05-31	LT	February 1966
Knighty Knight Bugs	1958-08-23	LT	February 1966
Pre-Hysterical Hare	1958-11-01	LT	April 1967
Baton Bunny	1959-01-10	LT	1968-04-20
Hare-Abian Nights	1959-02-28	LT	May 1967
Backwoods Bunny	1959-06-13	MM	September 1966
Wild and Woolly Hare	1959-08-01	LT	February 1967

== Cartoons with original technical credits restored on DVD/Blu-ray ==
Many of the above cartoons have been restored for DVD/Blu-ray release as part of the Looney Tunes Golden Collection, Looney Tunes Platinum Collection, Looney Tunes Super Stars, Warner Bros. Home Entertainment Academy Awards Animation Collection DVD releases, and the Looney Tunes Platinum Collection, Looney Tunes Collector's Choice, and Looney Tunes Collector's Vault Blu-ray releases. However, only a handful of cartoons that were reissued prior to the 1956–57 season have their original opening titles, technical credits, and closing titles restored.

- (*) Upon re-release, short retained original ending card.
- (**) "A Wild Hare" had its original credits present for The Golden Age of Looney Tunes Volume 4, though the opening titles on that release were just recreations.
- (***) Original opening titles and credits restored for their 1998 "THIS VERSION" prints.
- (#) Original opening titles and credits present for their 1995 Turner "dubbed" version prints.

Title	Original Release Date	Restored for the DVD/Blu-ray title
I Love to Singa*	1936-07-18	Looney Tunes Golden Collection Vol. 2
Speaking of the Weather	1937-09-04	Looney Tunes Golden Collection Vol. 3
Little Red Walking Hood	1937-11-06	Looney Tunes Golden Collection Vol. 5
Daffy Duck & Egghead	1938-01-01	Looney Tunes Golden Collection Vol. 3
The Night Watchman	1938-11-19	Looney Tunes Golden Collection Vol. 4
Little Brother Rat	1939-09-02	Looney Tunes Mouse Chronicles: The Chuck Jones Collection
Cross Country Detours	1940-03-16	Looney Tunes Collector's Choice: Vol. 2
The Bear's Tale*	1940-04-13	Looney Tunes Golden Collection Vol. 5
A Wild Hare* **	1940-07-27	Warner Bros. Home Entertainment Academy Awards Animation Collection
The Trial of Mr. Wolf	1941-04-26	Looney Tunes Golden Collection Vol. 5
Hiawatha's Rabbit Hunt* #	1941-06-07	Warner Bros. Home Entertainment Academy Awards Animation Collection
Trap Happy Porky	1945-02-24	Looney Tunes Mouse Chronicles: The Chuck Jones Collection
Book Revue	1946-01-05	Looney Tunes Golden Collection Vol. 2
Holiday for Shoestrings*	1946-02-23	Looney Tunes Golden Collection Vol. 5
Baby Bottleneck	1946-03-16	Looney Tunes Golden Collection Vol. 2
Hush My Mouse	1946-05-04	Looney Tunes Mouse Chronicles: The Chuck Jones Collection
Hobo Bobo	1947-05-17	Looney Tunes Collector's Choice: Vol. 3
Crowing Pains*	1947-07-12	Looney Tunes Golden Collection Vol. 6
A Horse Fly Fleas	1947-12-13	Looney Tunes Platinum Collection: Vol. 2
Back Alley Oproar*	1948-03-27	Looney Tunes Golden Collection Vol. 2
Hop, Look and Listen* #	1948-04-17	Looney Tunes Super Stars' Sylvester and Hippety Hopper: Marsupial Mayhem
The Rattled Rooster	1948-06-26	Looney Tunes Collector's Vault: Vol. 2
You Were Never Duckier*	1948-08-07	Looney Tunes Golden Collection Vol. 5
The Foghorn Leghorn* ***	1948-10-09	Looney Tunes Golden Collection Vol. 1
Kit for Cat***	1948-11-06	Looney Tunes Golden Collection Vol. 1
Scaredy Cat* ***	1948-12-18	Looney Tunes Golden Collection Vol. 1

In addition to the cartoons listed above, the following cartoons reissued after 1956–57 have had their original opening rings, and ending rings if re-released between 1959 and 1964, restored.

(*) Upon re-release, short retained original ending card.

Title	Original Release Date	Restored for the DVD/Blu-ray title
Hot Cross Bunny	1948-08-21	Bugs Bunny 80th Anniversary Collection
The Pest That Came to Dinner*	1948-09-11	Looney Tunes Super Stars' Porky & Friends: Hilarious Ham
Hare Splitter*	1948-09-25	Bugs Bunny 80th Anniversary Collection
Knights Must Fall	1949-07-16	Bugs Bunny 80th Anniversary Collection
Hippety Hopper*	1949-11-29	Looney Tunes Super Stars' Sylvester and Hippety Hopper: Marsupial Mayhem
A Ham in a Role	1949-12-31	Looney Tunes Golden Collection Vol. 6
Home, Tweet Home*	1950-01-14	Looney Tunes Golden Collection Vol. 2
The Lion's Busy	1950-02-18	Looney Tunes Golden Collection Vol. 2
Strife with Father	1950-04-01	Looney Tunes Golden Collection Vol. 2
The Hypo-Chondri-Cat*	1950-04-15	Looney Tunes Mouse Chronicles: The Chuck Jones Collection
It's Hummer Time*	1950-07-22	Looney Tunes Golden Collection Vol. 6
Dog Gone South*	1950-08-26	Looney Tunes Golden Collection Vol. 6
Canary Row*	1950-10-07	Looney Tunes Platinum Collection: Vol. 3
Pop 'Im Pop*	1950-10-28	Looney Tunes Super Stars' Sylvester and Hippety Hopper: Marsupial Mayhem
Dog Collared*	1950-12-02	Looney Tunes Super Stars' Porky & Friends: Hilarious Ham
Two's a Crowd*	1950-12-30	Looney Tunes Collector's Vault: Vol. 1
Canned Feud*	1951-02-03	Looney Tunes Platinum Collection: Vol. 2
Leghorn Swoggled	1951-07-28	Looney Tunes Collector's Choice: Vol. 4
Sleepy Time Possum	1951-11-03	Looney Tunes Collector's Vault: Vol. 3
Fool Coverage	1952-12-13	Looney Tunes Super Stars' Porky & Friends: Hilarious Ham
Upswept Hare	1953-03-14	Bugs Bunny 80th Anniversary Collection
From A to Z-Z-Z-Z	1954-10-16	Warner Bros. Home Entertainment Academy Awards Animation Collection
Bell Hoppy	1954-04-17	Looney Tunes Super Stars' Sylvester and Hippety Hopper: Marsupial Mayhem

"A Wild Hare", reissued as "The Wild Hare", had its original credits present for The Golden Age of Looney Tunes Volume 4, though the opening titles were just recreations. The original opening titles were restored for the Warner Bros. Home Entertainment Academy Awards Animation Collection (although the rings and shield were sourced from "A Gander at Mother Goose" due to the original print with the original titles being damaged).

The original titles for "The Merry Old Soul", "September in the Rain", "Tweetie Pie", "Tale of Two Mice", "House Hunting Mice", "Doggone Cats", "I Taw a Putty Tat", "Daffy Dilly", "Mouse Menace", "Life with Feathers", "Of Thee I Sting", and "Bone Sweet Bone" all are known to exist. However, Warner Bros. does not restore 8mm or 16mm prints, and many of these shorts only have their original titles in 8mm or 16mm versions, including those in black-and-white and those that are badly damaged. Hence, the Blue Ribbon titles for many of these were restored instead.

Fragments of the original titles for "A Day at the Zoo", "Of Fox and Hounds", "The Isle of Pingo Pongo", "Don't Look Now", "Wacky Wild Life", "Johnny Smith and Poker-Huntas", "Thugs with Dirty Mugs", "A Feud There Was", "The Early Worm Gets the Bird", "Circus Today", "The Mice Will Play", and "I Only Have Eyes for You", alongside other non-reissued films by Tex Avery, were sold in 2004 by Avery to a private collector, who then sold them on eBay in 2007. However, none of these fragments were acquired by Warner Bros. for official Looney Tunes DVDs and Blu-rays, streaming services, or television broadcasts.

Sketches and photos of the original titles and/or technical credits for "Katnip Kollege", "Sioux Me", "The Fifth-Column Mouse", "Pigs in a Polka", "The Mouse-Merized Cat", "The Cagey Canary", "A Tale of Two Kitties", "My Favorite Duck", "Horton Hatches the Egg", "The Sheepish Wolf", "Flop Goes the Weasel", "Hiss and Make Up, and "From Hand to Mouse" have surfaced, but no film elements have been found.

The original titles pre-1948 for "The Lady in Red", "When I Yoo Hoo", and "Fresh Fish" were restored for HBO Max, but have yet to be released on an official Looney Tunes DVD or Blu-ray. The restoration for "The Lady in Red" has its opening music recreated from the start, while the restoration for "When I Yoo Hoo" retains the Blue Ribbon ending titles. MeTV aired a restored version of "Cross Country Detours" with the original titles before it was released to the Looney Tunes Collector's Choice: Volume 2 Blu-ray. The original titles of "Farm Frolics" were found in the Library of Congress, but are never used on any home media releases, streaming service prints or television airings.

The original titles for "Hobo Bobo" were restored for the Looney Tunes Collector's Choice: Volume 3 Blu-ray (although the rings and shield were sourced from "Hollywood Daffy" due to the original print with the original titles being damaged).

== See also ==
- Looney Tunes
- Merrie Melodies
- Censored Eleven
- Looney Tunes Golden Collection
