= Circus Today =

1940 film by Fred Avery

- Original title card
- Directed by: Fred Avery
- Story by: Jack Miller
- Produced by: Leon Schlesinger
- Starring: Mel Blanc (uncredited)
- Music by: Carl W. Stalling
- Animation by: Sid Sutherland
- Color process: Technicolor
- Production company: Leon Schlesinger Productions
- Distributed by: Warner Bros. Pictures
- Release date: June 22, 1940
- Running time: 9 minutes
- Country: United States
- Language: English

Circus Today is a 1940 American animated comedy short film directed by Fred Avery. It was released on June 22, 1940. It is part of the Merrie Melodies series. It was re-released as a "Blue Ribbon" reissue in 1948, rendering the original film lost; Avery kept a nitrate fragment of the original titles, which was sold by his family in 2004 to a private collector, but still available publicly at extremely low definition.

== Plot ==
Outside the Jingling Bros. Circus tent (a parody of the Ringling Bros. Circus) a man tries to draw customers to the circus and points out some amazing acts and sights to see. A man offers balloons for children and realizes he is very high in the air before an off-screen voice introduces some acts, such as a glutton who can eat even the hardest and sharpest of items. He takes a bow, revealing his very flabby body shape. Next is Hot-Foot Hogan, a man who can walk on hot coals in just his bare feet. He demonstrates, yelling in pain until he sits back down again. Next is a special attraction, the sensational Captain Clamour, a human cannonball who flies very far into the distance and circles the Earth before landing, wearing the location stickers of places he has been.

Inside a small zoo is shown. A man disobeys a "Do Not Feed the Monkeys" sign until the monkey beats him up and calls the police. Next is an elderly stork who answers a nearby phone and struggles to talk to the person on the other line. A giant gorilla approaches the camera and is told of how threatening and dangerous he is, only to reveal he is actually very nice.

The voice continues on to the Flying Cadenzas, a group of men who can fly like birds. They fly around the entire tent and do tricks. One of them falls to the ground and the one who missed him hangs up a "Partner Wanted" sign. Next is Miss Dixie Dare, a woman who picks up a handkerchief with her teeth while riding a horse, but drops her teeth.

The next woman and her horse proceed to dance together before a lion tamer is shown with his lion. The tamer is doing very well, then forces open the lion's mouth, then sticks his head through it and pulls it out. This cheering makes the lion very happy so he tries it to the man, who seems to be highly surprised.

A group of elephants all line up by their tails and trunks, revealing a baby elephant second to last, as well as the Professor who is on the end. He then attempts to do one of his most dangerous tricks, allowing an elephant to sit on his head. But right before the elephant does it, he chickens out and begins to cry.

The final act consists of Count Maurice Leepov climbing a massive ladder onto a tiny panel, then jumping off of it into a very small tank of water. The band nearby begins to play music while the man is busy climbing up the ladder. He reaches the very top soon enough and then leaps from the wood panel... apparently not making it as the cartoon ends with a band member playing Taps.

== Home media ==
- Laserdisc - The Golden Age of Looney Tunes: Volume 3, Side 5
- Blu-ray - It All Came True
