= The Mice Will Play =

1938 film by Fred Avery

- Original title card
- Directed by: Fred Avery
- Story by: Jack Miller
- Produced by: Leon Schlesinger
- Starring: Mel Blanc
- Music by: Carl W. Stalling
- Animation by: Sid Sutherland
- Color process: Technicolor
- Production company: Leon Schlesinger Productions
- Distributed by: Warner Bros. Pictures; The Vitaphone Corporation
- Release date: December 31, 1938
- Running time: 7 min
- Country: United States
- Language: English

The Mice Will Play is a 1938 American animated comedy short film directed by Fred Avery. The short was released on December 31, 1938. It is part of the Merrie Melodies series. It was re-released as a "Blue Ribbon" reissue in 1949, rendering the original film lost; Avery kept a nitrate fragment of the original titles, which was sold by his family in 2004 to a private collector, but still available publicly at extremely low definition.

== Plot ==
Some mice find their way into I. M. Nutts' laboratory and are intrigued with their surroundings, which they explore after checking the laboratory to be actually empty by yelling and carving "Gone with the Wind" in the walls. They are entertained a series of slides under a microscope, including red and white blood cells having a football game, chickenpox depicted as literal chicks, and whooping cough germs who are humorously afflicted with the disease.

A cat spots them while the mice entertain themselves with a stethoscope and X-ray machine, while a female laboratory mouse named Susie screams for help in a cage in a nearby room. A mouse drinks neon fluid and lights up, while another tries on glasses and is confused into seeing the eye test's prices. An audience member stops the mice from prodding the mouse at the microscope with a syringe filled with chemicals. As the cat prepares to eat them, Susie folds a letter into a paper airplane and flies it into the main room, allowing a mouse to save her. The two mice fall in love and marry in the form of a jazz musical routine. The cat is going to kill the groom, but relents upon hearing that Susie wants to have a large number of baby mice, a long term benefit over eating the mice at once.

== Home media ==
This short is available as an extra on Looney Tunes Mouse Chronicles: The Chuck Jones Collection.
