= Thugs with Dirty Mugs =

1939 film by Fred Avery

- Original title card
- Directed by: Fred Avery
- Story by: Jack Miller
- Produced by: Leon Schlesinger
- Starring: Mel Blanc; Tex Avery; John Deering; Tedd Pierce
- Music by: Carl W. Stalling
- Animation by: Sid Sutherland
- Color process: Technicolor
- Production company: Leon Schlesinger Productions
- Distributed by: Warner Bros. Pictures
- Release date: May 6, 1939
- Running time: 8:05
- Language: English

Thugs with Dirty Mugs is a 1939 American animated comedy short film directed by Fred Avery. The short was released on May 6, 1939. It is part of the Merrie Melodies series. It was re-released as a "Blue Ribbon" reissue in 1944, rendering the original film lost; Avery kept a nitrate fragment of the original titles, which was sold by his family in 2004 to a private collector, but still available publicly at extremely low definition. After Avery moved to Metro-Goldwyn-Mayer, he directed a spiritual successor titled Who Killed Who? in 1943.

== Plot ==
The cartoon is depicted as a fictitious film-in-a-film. F.H.A. (Sherlock) Homes (a parody of Sherlock Holmes) portrays police chief Flat-Foot Flanigan, while Ed G. Robemsome" (a caricature of Edward G. Robinson) portrays gang leader Killer Diller. Flanigan is forced to handle the crimes committed by Killer Diller, who robs 87 national banks in a single day (initially skipping the 13th bank out of superstition, but robbbing it later without leaving the car). At night, Killer plays the Worst National Bank like a gambling machine and wins cash. Flanigan plays pin the tail on the donkey instead of pinning the criminals, but pins his buttocks instead.

One of the criminals is revealed to be a covert police officer who notifies Flanigan in an unhelpfully quiet manner. Killer impersonates Edward G. Robinson in his safehouse out of boredom to the chagrin of his underlings. They then rob a bank "reserved for gangsters" where a bank teller is knocked out for wanting to "tell" on them. The police "grill" a suspect, which is revealed to be Flanigan feeding a rat cheese before stopping to its chagrin. The gangsters rob another Worst National Bank, whose window shows their amount of assets; Killer finds out the bank has $2 left over and robs that too. He then hijacks a phone line with a gun, which nonsensically causes the phone operator to fold and pay him the cash left over.

Killer and his underlings notice an audience member leaving the theatre to their chagrin; the audience member instead notifies Flanigan of Killer's plans, which Flanigan uses to his advantage after insulting the audience member, who had watched the film twice. They find Killer and his underlings after they command their shadows to stay still and adjust a safe, which turns out to be a radio that they enjoy listening. Killer is arrested and sentenced to solitary confinement where he is seen writing lines on a blackboard. He is humiliated by the words "I've been a naughty boy".

== Reception ==
The cartoon was banned in Winnipeg, Manitoba in 1939 because censors "felt the film was just an excuse to show criminal activity."

Animation historian Greg Ford has said Thugs with Dirty Mugs "insightfully satirizes the live-action crime thrillers being made at the Warner Bros. studios during this period... The real secret behind Thugs with Dirty Mugs' durability lies in the spot-on accuracy with which the cartoon reconstructs the trappings of Warner's gangster films."

== Home media ==
Thugs with Dirty Mugs was released uncut and restored as part of the Looney Tunes Golden Collection: Volume 3 DVD set.

== See also ==
- Looney Tunes and Merrie Melodies filmography (1929–1939)
