= A Sunbonnet Blue =

1937 film by Fred Avery

- Directed by: Fred Avery
- Produced by: Leon Schlesinger
- Starring: Mel Blanc
- Music by: Carl W. Stalling
- Animation by: Sid Sutherland; Virgil Ross
- Color process: Technicolor
- Production company: Leon Schlesinger Productions
- Distributed by: Warner Bros. Productions; The Vitaphone Corporation
- Release date: August 21, 1937
- Running time: 7 min
- Country: United States
- Language: English

A Sunbonnet Blue is a 1937 American animated comedy short film directed by Fred Avery. It was first released to theaters on August 21, 1937. It is the 80th film in the Merrie Melodies series. It was re-released as a "Blue Ribbon" reissue in 1945, rendering the original film and credits lost.

== Plot ==
A mouse living in a hat shop emerges after the shop is closed for the day and calls for his peers. He bites the mousehole into the shape of a hat and arrow to welcome his girlfriend, only to be followed by a rat with malicious intent. They sing the titular song under a hat and a sunbonnet, which marry and have children in no time. They are then followed by the Three Ratz Brothers, a caricature of the Ritz Brothers who emerge from a dunce cap after fighting and sing. The spotlight is covered with colored foil to dramatize the rats' emotions.

The rat abducts the mouse's girlfriend, so he summons a large number of mice to pursue him, including the army, fire fighters, police, a caricature of George Washington and a blind mouse. He finds the rat and uses a top hat to cause him to slip and fall into a knight's helmet, locking him inside and saving his girlfriend. Some time later, they marry and are comedically gifted a human-sized sunbonnet.
