= Fresh Fish =

1939 film by Fred Avery

- Original title card
- Directed by: Fred Avery
- Story by: Jack Miller
- Produced by: Leon Schlesinger
- Starring: Mel Blanc
- Narrated by: Robert C. Bruce
- Music by: Carl W. Stalling
- Animation by: Sid Sutherland
- Color process: Technicolor
- Production company: Leon Schlesinger Productions
- Distributed by: Warner Bros. Pictures
- Release date: October 28, 1939
- Running time: 7 min
- Country: United States
- Language: English

Fresh Fish is a 1939 American animated comedy short film directed by Fred Avery. The short was released on October 28, 1939. It is part of the Merrie Melodies series. It was re-released as a "Blue Ribbon" reissue in 1946. Avery kept a nitrate fragment of the original titles, which was sold by his family in 2004 to a private collector. The original titles were restored for HBO Max in 2020.

== Plot ==
An educational cruise with a glass bottom sets off to Floy Floy, an island in Santa Anita, in order to observe the local fauna. Professor Mackrel Fishface dives into the water in his diving bell in order to search for the legendary whim-wham-whistle shark.

The audience are shown a school of sardines tightly packed as if they are in a can. A tuna, nicknamed the "chicken of the sea", literally acts like a chicken and lays a large amount of eggs. An old crab is depicted as a caricature of Ned Sparks, a hermit crab who literally behaves like a hermit, while a taxi crab is depicted as a literal taxi. A dainty little starfish, a caricature of Katharine Hepburn, expresses her wish to appear in film as a leading lady. An electric eel lights up and shows the sign "Eat at Joe's". A two-headed fish repeatedly annoys the narrator by asking him where to find Mr. Ripley.

A Polynesian Dog fish barks at and annoys an insect-like fish, who barks louder to terrify it. The narrator explains that fish use their fins to manipulate their environment and propel themselves, humorously showing a fish whose fins resemble money. Mackrel continues to sink in his diving bell. An octopus is scared by a harmless sunfish booing despite trying to hunt it. A mussel is humorously depicted as highly muscular. A pickled herring is depicted as a drunk singing herring, who narrowly avoids being eaten by a whale by dashing out of its teeth. Seahorses race like actual horses, though an old seahorse with crutches surpasses the younger racers. The two-headed fish returns and is told to go "lay an egg", which they interpret literally.

Sharks are seen, including a tiger shark depicted as tiger-like and meows like a kitten, a hammerhead shark who hits himself with a hammer and a shovelhead shark literally shovels dirt on the seafloor. Mackrel finally reaches the seafloor. A school of fish is depicted as a literal school, where a teacher fish teaches the fish how to approach bait from the bottom; he approaches the bait straight on as an intended way to teach what not to do, only to be actually be caught by a fisherman, who dismisses class to the students' joy. Mackrel finally spots and catches the whim-wham-whistling shark, but is killed and eaten in the diving bell while it is lifted to the surface.
