= Flop Goes the Weasel =

Flop Goes the Weasel may refer to:

- Flop Goes the Weasel - A 1943 Merrie Melodies cartoon.
- "Flop Goes the Weasel" - A 1989 episode from Garfield and Friends

== See also ==
- Pop Goes the Weasel, the original nursery rhyme that the title of these works refers to.
