= The Early Worm Gets the Bird =

1940 film by Fred Avery

- Original title card
- Directed by: Fred Avery
- Story by: Jack Miller
- Produced by: Leon Schlesinger
- Starring: Mel Blanc; Sara Berner; Margaret Hill-Talbot
- Music by: Carl W. Stalling
- Animation by: Robert Cannon
- Color process: Technicolor
- Production company: Leon Schlesinger Productions
- Distributed by: Warner Bros. Pictures
- Release date: January 6, 1940
- Running time: 8 min
- Country: United States
- Language: English

The Early Worm Gets the Bird is a 1940 American animated comedy short film directed by Fred Avery. The short was released on January 6, 1940. It is part of the Merrie Melodies series. It was re-released as a "Blue Ribbon" reissue in 1943 and 1952, rendering the original film lost; Avery kept a nitrate fragment of the original titles, which was sold by his family in 2004 to a private collector, but still available publicly at extremely low definition. The film is in the public domain as United Artists, then owner of Associated Artists Productions, neglected to renew its copyright on time. The name is a play on the adage "The early bird gets the worm."

== Plot ==
The reissued version

At the Blackbirds' house, Willie and his siblings say their bedtime prayers. Their mother, a literal mammy, tells them goodnight, and the children get into bed to go to sleep. She catches Willie reading "The Early Bird Gets the Worm" and tells the trio that a fox will hunt them shall they wake up early to catch a worm, which they are oblivious to.

The next day, Willie sneaks out to catch the worm at 5 a.m. The worm finds the book which Willie's mother threw out of the window and is curious about the early bird. They run into each other, leading Willie to chase the worm who tricks him while hiding in a plethora of places, including a flower inhabited by an extremely aggressive bee.

The fox emerges and tricks Willie into thinking he is also there to chase the worm; he does not realize the fox is a fox until he remembers his mother's description of the fox's appearance. While the fox tries to eat Willie with ketchup, the worm changes his mind and goads the bee from earlier into stinging the fox, who believes he has been stabbed because of the ketchup on his face. Willie and the worm make amends, but the bee chases them home. Willie returns just in time to wake up with his siblings, noting that he does not want worms for breakfast, only for the worm to inadvertently reveal his presence.

== Reception ==
Motion Picture Exhibitor (Jan 24, 1940): "The little bird doesn't believe the story, wants to find out for himself, is caught by the bad fox, and then saved by the little worm, all of which is familiar, but made in the better Schlesinger vein. Good."

Motion Picture Herald (Oct 10, 1943): "A sidelight on the old adage, this Leon Schlesinger cartoon suggests that a bird can't be too careful."

== See also ==
- Looney Tunes and Merrie Melodies filmography (1940-1949)
- List of animated films in the public domain in the United States
