= The Lady in Red (1935 film) =

1935 film by Isadore Freleng

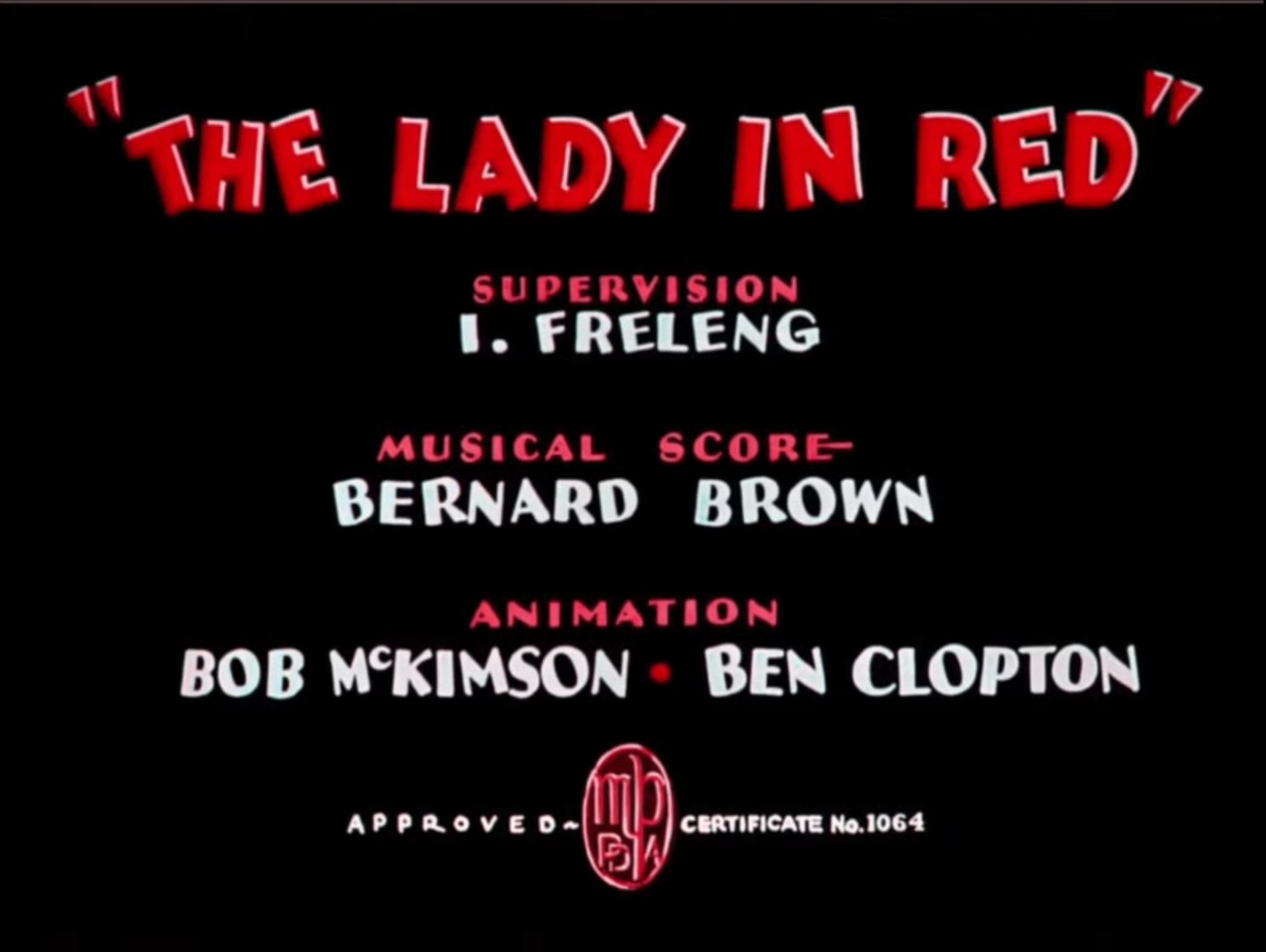
- Original title card
- Directed by: Isadore Freleng
- Produced by: Leon Schlesinger
- Starring: The Varsity Three; Bernard B. Brown; Count Cutelli; Jeanne Dunne
- Music by: Bernard Brown
- Animation by: Bob McKimson; Ben Clopton
- Color process: Technicolor
- Production company: Leon Schlesinger Productions
- Distributed by: Warner Bros. Productions; The Vitaphone Corporation
- Release date: September 7, 1935
- Running time: 7 minutes
- Country: United States
- Language: English

The Lady in Red is a 1935 American animated comedy short film directed by Isadore Freleng. The short was released on September 7, 1935. It is the 49th film in the Merrie Melodies series, featuring the titular song from the film In Caliente. It was re-released as a "Blue Ribbon" reissue in 1951.

== Plot ==
A society of cockroaches thrive in a Mexican café in the absence of its owner, Manuel who is reportedly "off to the bullfights". They take ferry rides on a teacup on a flooded sink, eat snacks freely with the help of tools, bowl with olives and play tennis with peas.

One particular cockroach rows across the sink while singing the titular song. He arrives at a nightclub where a caricature of Rudy Vallée sings. The title song resumes with multiple cockroaches performing instruments on different objects. A female cockroach wears a scarlet meat frill as a dress and dances to the others' singing, mesmerizing the cockroach visitor. A parrot spots the cockroaches and escapes from its cage to chase them. It snatches away the female cockroach and chases it to the stove, where it finally grabs the female cockroach, only for the male cockroach to turn on the stove and burn its buttocks. The parrot desperately yelps in pain and flies out of the window, where its trail spells "The End" while the female cockroach gives her thanks.

== Home video release ==
This cartoon was released with its original titles as an extra on the Blu-ray release of the film Joe's Apartment.

== See also ==
- Looney Tunes and Merrie Melodies filmography (1929–1939)
