= Sioux Me =

1939 film by Ben Hardaway and Cal Dalton

- Original title card
- Directed by: Ben Hardaway; Cal Dalton
- Story by: Melvin Millar
- Produced by: Leon Schlesinger
- Starring: Mel Blanc (uncredited)
- Music by: Carl W. Stalling
- Animation by: Herman Cohen
- Color process: Technicolor
- Production company: Leon Schlesinger Productions
- Distributed by: Warner Bros. Pictures
- Release date: September 3, 1939
- Running time: 7 min
- Country: United States
- Language: English

Sioux Me is a 1939 American animated comedy short film directed by Ben Hardaway and Cal Dalton. The short was released on September 3, 1939. It is part of the Merrie Melodies series. It was re-released as a "Blue Ribbon" reissue in 1951, rendering the original film lost.

== Plot ==
A Native American reservation in Oklahoma is experiencing the worst drought in a decade, where temperatures rise to the point crops and inanimate objects are unable to handle it. The chief reluctantly hires a rain dancer, whose endeavors are in vain. The chief's son is ordered to purchase water, but instead buys a set of weather pills which can cause natural phenomena including rain.

Animals and starving women eat the pills, causing them to be affected by the weathers in the pills. A buzzard steals the rain pill, but the rain dancer shoots it into the sky, causing rainfall which reinvigorates the crops. The rain dancer takes credit and shakes hands with the chief, who attempts to stab him when the rain stops, but continues shaking hands once the rain returns.
