= Plenty of Money and You =

1937 film by Isadore Freleng

- Directed by: Isadore Freleng
- Produced by: Leon Schlesinger
- Starring: Mel Blanc
- Music by: Carl W. Stalling
- Animation by: Cal Dalton; Phil Monroe
- Color process: Technicolor
- Production company: Leon Schlesinger Productions
- Distributed by: Warner Bros. Productions; The Vitaphone Corporation
- Release date: July 31, 1937
- Running time: 7 min
- Country: United States
- Language: English

Plenty of Money and You is a 1937 American animated comedy short film directed by Isadore Freleng. It was first released to theaters on July 31, 1937. It is the 79th film in the Merrie Melodies series. It was re-released as a "Blue Ribbon" reissue in 1944, rendering the original film and credits lost.

== Plot ==
At a farm, a hen counts the days since she laid eggs, only for all her eggs to hatch, including an ostrich baby which is larger than all hens in the farm. The hens are horrified by its large size. The ostrich struggles to catch up with its chick siblings due to its large legs; it tries to catch a fish in a pond between trees, but is pulled back by the hen before it can eat the fish.

The ostrich falls into a basement, where it eats a metal object that stretches its neck. It emerges and finds an earthworm summoned by the hen, which hides in the soil after a chase. The ostrich then pursues a garden hose, which sprays water into its eyes multiple times, and throws the ostrich into a hole after it tries to bite the hose.

A weasel abducts the ostrich and attempts to cook it, to the horror of the hen. As he reads a recipe and follows it, the ostrich eats the light bulb, which the weasel recovers quickly and deems an annoyance. The ostrich then swallows fireworks, which the weasel does not realize until he loads the ostrich into his stove, causing it to explode as the ostrich spits fireworks. The weasel begrudgingly releases the ostrich to the hen, who is overjoyed despite the ostrich continuing to spit fireworks.
