= The Rattled Rooster =

- Directed by: Arthur Davis
- Story by: Dave Monahan
- Starring: Mel Blanc
- Music by: Carl Stalling
- Animation by: Don Williams; John Carey; Basil Davidovich; J.C. Melendez
- Layouts by: Don Smith
- Backgrounds by: Phillip DeGuard
- Color process: Technicolor
- Production company: Warner Bros. Cartoons
- Distributed by: Warner Bros. Pictures
- Release date: June 26, 1948
- Running time: 7 minutes
- Language: English

The Rattled Rooster is a 1948 Warner Bros. Looney Tunes animated cartoon directed by Arthur Davis. The short was released on June 26, 1948.

In this short, a frustrated rooster attempts to catch a precocious worm. However, the tables turn when the rooster finds himself being chased by an amorous female rattlesnake.

== Plot ==
After reading about the "early bird getting the worm", a frustrated rooster attempts to beat his fellow fowls to the punch, but winds up being late for breakfast anyway. The only meal left is a precocious worm with a mischievous attitude who delights in teasing and tormenting the hungry rooster. The rooster makes several bids to catch his prey, but the worm's pranks get the better of him each time (getting electrocuted, drenched with a hose, launched from a bazooka and so on).

Eventually, the worm scares the rooster off by wrapping a baby's rattle around his tail and masquerading as a rattlesnake. His disguise inadvertently attracts the attention of an amorous female rattlesnake who captures him in her coils and proceeds to woo and kiss the terrified worm. The rooster, realizing that the worm was in disguise, tries to grab him, but ends up seizing the female rattlesnake by mistake (who misinterprets his embrace for romantic intent).

The female rattlesnake chases both the worm and the rooster, who in turn team up to stop her advances. Using a pair of precisely driven golf balls, they pin her in the knothole of a wooden fence. The rooster attempts to turn on the worm following their partnership, only to have the worm use the same golf ball trick to trap him in the fence right next to the female rattlesnake. Seeing only his elongated neck and head, the female rattlesnake mistakes the trembling rooster for a male snake and begins batting her eyelids at him flirtatiously.

== Reissue ==
The Rattled Rooster was among the many Looney Tunes shorts reissued under the Blue Ribbon label. It was reissued on October 22, 1955. The original titles for this short were restored for HBO Max and were later released to the Looney Tunes Collector's Vault: Volume 2 Blu-ray set.
