= The Trial of Mr. Wolf =

1941 film by Isadore Freleng

- Title card
- Directed by: Isadore Freleng
- Story by: Michael Maltese
- Produced by: Leon Schlesinger
- Starring: Mel Blanc
- Music by: Carl W. Stalling
- Animation by: Richard Bickenbach
- Production company: Leon Schlesinger Productions
- Distributed by: Warner Bros. Pictures
- Release date: April 26, 1941
- Running time: 7 min
- Country: United States
- Language: English

The Trial of Mr. Wolf is a 1941 American animated comedy short film directed by Isadore Freleng. It was released on April 26, 1941. It is part of the Merrie Melodies series. It is a parody of the trial film genre and established Michael Maltese as one of the series' most prominent writers. It was re-released as a "Blue Ribbon" reissue in 1946 and 1954.

== Plot ==
Little Red Riding Hood is on trial for the events that conspired in the titular fairy tale. The plaintiff, the Big Bad Wolf, has an advantage in the form of a jury consisting of eight like-minded wolves and a skunk, as well as a wolf defense attorney, all of whom conspire to the Big Bad Wolf's favor by implicating Red, despite the Big Bad Wolf dropping weapons hidden in his clothes.

In the Big Bad Wolf's testimony, he claims to be dancing, picking flowers for his mother and talking to animals like a child, only to be called out by a bird. He skips to his mother's house while Little Red Riding Hood sneaks nearby. She feigns distress while tripping the Big Bad Wolf. As the Big Bad Wolf spins a dial that leads them to Red's grandmother's house, she starts a motorcycle with the Big Bad Wolf in tow. Red's grandmother is a furrier who helped conspire the plan and hides her furcoats. Red forces the Big Bad Wolf to impersonate her while she locks multiple doors. Red's grandmother chases the wolf with increasingly powerful weapons and chokes him before he escapes.

The Big Bad Wolf is horrified to find that the wolf jury to be suspicious of his testimony. As a last stand, he proclaims that if his testimony was indeed false, a streetcar will run him over. A streetcar does run him over, which he claims to be the fault of slight exaggeration on his part.
