= The Good Egg =

1939 film by Charles Jones

- Directed by: Charles Jones
- Story by: Dave Monahan
- Produced by: Leon Schlesinger
- Music by: Carl W. Stalling
- Animation by: Ken Harris
- Color process: Technicolor
- Production company: Leon Schlesinger Productions
- Distributed by: Warner Bros. Pictures
- Release date: October 21, 1939
- Running time: 7 min
- Country: United States
- Language: English

The Good Egg is a 1939 American animated comedy short film directed by Charles Jones. The short was released to theaters as early as October 21, 1939. It is part of the Merrie Melodies series. It was re-released as a "Blue Ribbon" reissue in 1946, rendering the original film and credits lost.

== Plot ==
At a farm, a hen sorrowfully watches other hens hatch their eggs while she remains infertile. After she is rejected by a hen for cradling her child on a whim, she leaves for the river to attempt suicide by drowning. She is tripped by a giant egg, which motivates her to change her mind and nurse the egg instead, much to the other hens' ridicule. The egg eventually hatches to reveal a chick-like tortoise.

The tortoise, not realizing he is not a chick, is ostracized by the other chicks for his appearance. They sail on a flimsily-constructed boat while leaving him behind. This proves to be their undoing when the boat breaks and sinks, but the tortoise manages to use his shell to his advantage and save them from drowning. The chicks accept the tortoise as one of their own and sail on the water again with him as their lifeguard.
