= My Little Buckaroo =

1938 film by Isadore Freleng

- Directed by: Isadore Freleng
- Story by: Tedd Pierce
- Produced by: Leon Schlesinger
- Starring: Mel Blanc
- Music by: Carl W. Stalling
- Animation by: Bob McKimson
- Color process: Technicolor
- Production company: Leon Schlesinger Productions
- Distributed by: Warner Bros. Productions; The Vitaphone Corporation
- Release date: January 29, 1938
- Running time: 7 min
- Country: United States
- Language: English

My Little Buckaroo is a 1938 American animated comedy short film directed by Isadore Freleng. It was released on January 29, 1938. It is the 89th film in the Merrie Melodies series. It was re-released as a "Blue Ribbon" reissue in 1943 as My Little Buckeroo, rendering the original film and credits to be lost. It seldom airs on television due to its stereotyping of Mexican people.

== Plot ==
In 1872, a Mexican bandit named the Terror terrorizes the border town Boiled Beef, Texas. He effortlessly robs a bank, stealing a leftover penny from a pay phone before leaving. The townsfolk attempt to chase, but their horses are on strike for not being fed. The Terror returns to his hideout in Mexico, where he wastes the money on a slot machine. He returns at night to rob carriages.

A sheriff pig sings the titular song while half awake, when the Terror passes by. He gives chase and misses shots from the Terror's slot machine gun. He follows the Terror on a conveniently placed escalator and onto a cliff. To the pig's chagrin, the horse enjoys sliding down a steep slope and returns to the top and slides again; the pig begrudgingly enables him after he complains about not getting to have fun. The pig uses a lasso attached to a shotgun to capture and imprison the Terror.

== Availability ==
- LaserDisc - The Golden Age of Looney Tunes, Volume 5, Side 3
