= He Was Her Man (1937 film) =

1937 film by Isadore Freleng

- Directed by: Isadore Freleng
- Produced by: Leon Schlesinger
- Music by: Carl W. Stalling
- Animation by: Paul Smith; Cal Dalton
- Color process: Technicolor
- Production company: Leon Schlesinger Productions
- Distributed by: Warner Bros. Productions; The Vitaphone Corporation
- Release date: January 2, 1937
- Running time: 7 min
- Country: United States
- Language: English

He Was Her Man is a 1937 American animated comedy short film directed by Isadore Freleng. The short was released on January 2, 1937. It is the 68th film in the Merrie Melodies series. It was re-released as a "Blue Ribbon" reissue in 1949, rendering the original film and credits lost.

== Plot ==
A poor female mouse sells apples during winter, only to be ignored by all but one person who spitefully bites the apple. A rich mouse passes by and buys one apple for 5 cents. She returns home, fantasizing her husband to be resembling a caricature of Clark Gable. She walks up numerous stairs, with similar pigs humorously walking out of the bathrooms on each floor, only to reenter upon spotting the mouse.

Her husband, a lazy and abusive mouse who spends his days playing cards, demands her to hand in her income, spotting a gold coin in her mouth and taking it as his own. He makes his wife cook dinner while he spots a voluptuous woman entering a nearby saloon, causing her to pass out as he leaves her. She decides to make a living by singing in a bar, where people are instead focused on eating free lunches. Her husband and his mistress suddenly walk in, causing her to approach him, only to be rejected. They fight, with the female mouse finding a gun, and fires three rounds, one of which hits her husband on his genitalia. As he pretends to be dead and slowly awakes in an attempt to regain his wife's favor, he is ultimately knocked out with a bottle and forced to sell apples instead, while his wife plays cards and monitors him. His mistress walks by and he tries to sell an apple, only to be ignored and hit by his wife.
