= Don't Look Now (1936 film) =

1936 film by Fred Avery

- Original title card
- Directed by: Fred Avery
- Produced by: Leon Schlesinger
- Starring: Tex Avery; Billy Bletcher; Tommy Bond; Bernice Hansen; Martha Wentworth
- Music by: Carl W. Stalling
- Animation by: Bob Clampett; Joe D'Igalo
- Color process: Technicolor
- Production company: Leon Schlesinger Productions
- Distributed by: Warner Bros. Productions; The Vitaphone Corporation
- Release date: November 7, 1936
- Running time: 7 mins
- Country: United States
- Language: English

Don't Look Now is a 1936 American animated comedy short film directed by Fred Avery. The short was released on November 7, 1936. It is the 66th film in the Merrie Melodies series. It was re-released as a "Blue Ribbon" reissue in 1948, rendering the original film lost; Avery kept a nitrate fragment of the original titles, which was sold by his family in 2004 to a private collector, but still available publicly at extremely low definition.

== Plot ==
On Valentine's Day, Dan Cupid wakes up, noticing the occasion and quickly harvests his arrows from his fields for work, shooting people to make them fall in love. He partakes in target practice by shooting some cards launched up by a toaster, shooting an arrow through a log into an apple on his head, as well as some duck targets. Satan also wakes up to sabotage relationships due to his hatred of the occasion.

Cupid shoots a female turtle, who becomes infatuated with a male turtle who proposes to her and jumps into his shell. Satan reveals his toolkit for sabotaging relationships, strands of blonde hair and lipstick, which help give off the impression of infidelity. His first victim, a female woodpecker, is fooled by this trick, only for it to be reversed by an arrow by Cupid. A bear couple which Satan sabotaged some time earlier also reconcile after Cupid's intervention. A skunk fired at by Cupid fails to find a partner.

The male bear invites the female bear to watch a burlesque performance, only to be peppered with lipstick and blonde hair, which piques the female bear's disgust. Cupid manages to convert her again. Satan notices Cupid and beats him up, but Cupid fires his tail like an arrow to pin him to a tree. As the two bears marry each other, Satan bribes two children with candy to have them call the groom "Daddy", to implicate him of having children out of wedlock. While this is successful at causing the bride to leave him out of disgust, Cupid fires at her again to fix the situation, as well as Satan, who is paired up with the skunk from before, causing everyone else to hide out of disgust.

== Home media ==
The short is available on disc 1 of the Looney Tunes Collector's Vault: Volume 3 Blu-ray set.
