= Cross Country Detours =

1940 film by Fred Avery

- Original title card
- Directed by: Fred Avery
- Story by: Rich Hogan
- Produced by: Leon Schlesinger
- Music by: Carl W. Stalling
- Animation by: Paul Smith
- Color process: Technicolor
- Production company: Leon Schlesinger Productions
- Distributed by: Warner Bros. Pictures
- Release date: March 16, 1940
- Running time: 9 min
- Country: United States
- Language: English

Cross Country Detours is a 1940 American animated comedy short film directed by Fred Avery. The short was released on March 16, 1940. It is part of the Merrie Melodies series and one of the longest films in the series, clocking at almost 10 minutes. It was re-released as a "Blue Ribbon" reissue in 1944.

A parody of nature documentary, it presents various settings in the United States and is particularly remembered for its use of a split screen and rotoscoping as well as for featuring a scene depicting the mock striptease of a lizard and one including the suicide of a frog.

== Plot ==
The film is a travelogue spoof where the narrator introduces a series of unrelated gags around the United States.

At Yosemite National Park in California, a tourist attempts to feed a bear a sandwich in blatant disregard of a sign instructing otherwise, only to be angrily reprimanded by the bear. A "shy little deer" impersonates Mae West. A scoutmaster takes an absurdly large amount of Boy Scouts to a gas station washroom. A park ranger spots an irresponsible tourist smoking a cigar and dropping it, running to the location as if to pick it up and prevent a wildfire, only to smoke the cigar instead.

At Bryce Canyon in Utah, a natural bridge is revealed to be shaped like a dental bridge, gold tooth and all. At Alaska, a polar bear freezes his buttocks in contrary to the narrator's claims that his coat and fat keeps him warm. An Eskimo dog decides to travel 5000 miles to California, which he does so for the remainder of the film. In another part of the United States, a bobcat prepares to pounce on and eat a cute baby quail, but he can't bring himself to do it to the point of having an emotional meltdown.

At a local pond in the Everglades where many frogs reside, the narrator says, "Here, we have a close-up of a frog croaking." The frog then takes out a pistol and commits suicide by shooting itself in the head. A patron's notice appears, stating that the management is not responsible for any lame puns in the cartoon. This scene is censored on television. In New Mexico, a lizard is shedding her skin, which plays out like a striptease which self-censors before her breasts are exposed.

The narrator says that the next tale is very gruesome and that he will split the screen in two halves, with the grownups' side on the left and the children's side on the right. On the grownups' side, a Gila monster constantly snarls and growls, and on the children's side, a little girl recites "Mary Had a Little Lamb". After being interrupted by the Gila monster, she growls back at it, causing it to run away. At the Grand Canyon, a hiker tries to make an echo twice, but nothing happens. So finally, for the third attempt, he shouts at the top of his lungs and a female telephone operator's voice says "I'm sorry, they do not answer." At the Colorado River, some beavers create a giant dam that looks man-made in sonic speed. The Eskimo dog arrives at California and is enthralled by the Redwood Forest.

== Cast ==
- Lou Marcelle: narration
- Sara Berner: female voices
- Mel Blanc: male voices

== Production ==
The film was written by Rich Hogan and animated by Paul Smith. Carl W. Stalling served as music director.

Avery shot live action scenes to serve as reference footage for the animators, notably for the Mae West-deer and the lizard's striptease scenes.

In an interview with Joe Adamson, Avery told the latter:

"Avery: Here's this little lizard running along, and then she suddenly gets up and “Da da da DA!” But there, we had the real babe! And she was undressing. She'd take off her sleeve here (the skin) and toss it out. We Rotoscoped her action to fit the lizard. Shaped the lizard like a girl, took off her skin and she was just a lighter green. It got a great laugh, too.

Adamson: I wonder if that's really a sensual act among lizards.

Avery: No, snakes do it. What the heck, we couldn't animate a snake."

== Reception ==
Contemporary reception found the film to be a funny parody. The Motion Picture Herald found that this "satire (went) to new lengths in achieving male audience appeal." The Exhibitor noted in 1943: "When first released in 1940, this drew raves, and was considered one of the best of the color cartoons."

It was later described as an Avery "classic", implementing indeed in a mock travelogue format, surreal ideas and spot gags. The film was called "the most famous of his travelogue spoofs" and deemed better than its predecessor of the previous year, Detouring America. Glenn Erickson considered it was one of Avery's "WB's masterpieces".

The "self-censored" episode of the lizard's striptease in New Mexico was particularly commented: "although the strip teaser in the cartoon is a lizard (shedding its skin, you understand), it is only one short step removed from its human original." the cartoon "spoofed the reaction to the «danger» of depicting somebody in full frontal nudity even if it is only a lizard".

Noting how "(i)n some cartoons, Avery actually seems embarrassed by the obviousness of his gags", Michael Barrier stated: "Avery had occasionally made such a mock apology in his Schlesinger cartoons, most notably in Cross Country Detours: immediately after the narrator, Robert C. Bruce, says, "Here we show you a frog croaking," the frog shoots itself and a card appears onscreen, announcing that the theater's management disclaims any responsibility for the puns used in the cartoon. The timing of the frog's "croak" is perfect, though— there's no opportunity for an audience to anticipate the gag— and so the "apology" is more like a smirk." The scene was deleted for the original release in 1940 before being restored in its 1944 reissue.

The role of the voice over is also analysed by Cristina Formenti as being part of the economy of the parody of nature documentary.

The early use of a split screen was also noted. In terms of animation, the cartoon was said to stand out among the production of the time. It is notably known for its "most explicit" use of rotoscoping.

== Home media ==
The film was released on Blu-Ray as part of Looney Tunes Collector's Choice Volume 2.
