= It's Hummer Time =

- Title card
- Directed by: Robert McKimson
- Story by: Warren Foster
- Starring: Mel Blanc
- Music by: Carl Stalling
- Animation by: Rod Scribner; J.C. Melendez; Charles McKimson; Phil DeLara; John Carey; Emery Hawkins; Harry Love
- Layouts by: Cornett Wood
- Backgrounds by: Richard H. Thomas
- Color process: Technicolor
- Production company: Warner Bros. Cartoons
- Distributed by: Warner Bros. Pictures
- Release date: July 22, 1950
- Running time: 7:03
- Language: English

It's Hummer Time is a 1950 Warner Bros. Looney Tunes cartoon directed by Robert McKimson and written by Warren Foster. The short was released on July 22, 1950. The cartoon stars a tuxedo cat who attempts to catch a hummingbird, only to get in the way of a bulldog who subjects him to various forms of torture for accidentally hurting and bugging him while doing so to the tune of Raymond Scott's Powerhouse, the cat seeming to know what's in store for him each time (saying, in a recurring gag, "No! NOT [the punishment]! NOT THAT!" each time it happens). All voice characterizations are performed by Mel Blanc.

== Plot ==
Outside a local park, a green hummingbird is shown flying around, eventually finding signs directing toward a bird bath (which is actually a tuxedo cat carrying a bowl and water hose). Upon arriving, the bird settles down, as the cat slowly tries to grab it. The bird eventually squirts water at the cat's face, prompting him to give chase until he reaches a bulldog sleeping in his doghouse. The bulldog, disgruntled, grabs the cat by his neck as he yells, "No, NOT THE FENCE! NOT THAT AGAIN!" as he is taken to the fence, and is punished by being pulled by the tail through a knothole in the fence.

The cat's next attempt then involves him grabbing a pink phonograph horn to disguise it as a flower to attract the same hummingbird. This plan ultimately fails, as the bird drops a stick of dynamite into the horn, with said horn exploding in the cat's face. The bird eventually begins flying by the bulldog, this time walking along the grass as it flies and hums around him. The cat, this time armed with a net, spots the bird and attempts to catch the bird, only to whack the bulldog in the head. His next punishment from the dog immediately follows; the punishment this time being a faux birthday party simply titled "Happy Birthday" with dynamite sticks in place of candles on a cake, all of which blow up in the cat's face.

After a cross-fade, the cat then attaches fuchsia petals to a fishing rod hook, with a red balloon on top. After launching it into the air, the hummingbird paints a picture of the cat onto the balloon and drags it down to the bulldog, who notices the cat's image and then says (quoting Tweety): "I tawt I taw a puddy tat!" The dog eventually pops the balloon containing the cat's picture, and then tugs the fishing line containing the fuchsia petals, prompting the cat to pull him over to his location. The dog then pulls the cat towards a rain pipe and pulls him through it from the roof of a house (essentially giving him the same treatment as The Fence).

While thinking of yet another plan, the bird flies around the cat as he follows it to the dog, with the bird walking around his bones. After lunging towards the two, the cat realizes that he only got to the bones (due to the hummingbird flying away again), and the dog promptly subjects him to a modified cement mixer, which he sets to The Thinker, resulting of a replica of the statue of the same name but with the cat in place of the actual man. Next, The hummingbird attempts to trick the cat into thinking that the dog ate it. In response, the cat applies sneezing powder against the dog's nose to open his mouth, and after taking a flashlight to look inside, the dog sneezes and subjects the cat to his final punishment: The Works, which starts out with the fence and takes him towards a long trail leading into the same cement mixer for "The Thinker." Unfortunately for him, the hummingbird ties the dog to a rope that was also used for the cat, essentially now meaning that both animals become subject to the rig. The cartoon ends with both animals in the mixer as the hummingbird sets it to "Bird Bath," resulting in them now becoming a shared bird bath as the bird dives into it off the cat's tongue whilst mockingly mimicking the cat by saying "Oh no, not the BIRD BATH! Not that!"

== Other appearances ==
- The tuxedo cat and bulldog would later appear in Early to Bet the next year, also directed by Robert McKimson. Prior to said sequel, the bulldog appeared in A Fox in a Fix.

== Home media ==
It's Hummer Time is available uncut and restored with its original opening titles on the Looney Tunes Golden Collection: Volume 6 DVD set.

== See also ==
- Looney Tunes
- Looney Tunes and Merrie Melodies filmography (1950–1959)
- Robert McKimson
