= Stage Fright (1940 film) =

1940 film by Charles Jones

- Directed by: Charles Jones
- Story by: Rich Hogan
- Produced by: Leon Schlesinger
- Starring: Mel Blanc
- Music by: Carl W. Stalling
- Animation by: Ken Harris
- Color process: Technicolor
- Production company: Leon Schlesinger Productions
- Distributed by: Warner Bros. Pictures
- Release date: September 28, 1940
- Running time: 8 min
- Country: United States
- Language: English

Stage Fright is a 1940 American animated comedy short film directed by Charles Jones. It was released on September 28, 1940. It is part of the Merrie Melodies series and the fourth cartoon to feature the Two Curious Puppies. It was re-released as a "Blue Ribbon" reissue in 1951, rendering the original film and credits lost.

== Plot ==
Two puppies fight over a bone, with the smaller puppy gaining an advantage as they chase each other into a theater, attracting the attention of a sleeping seal whose owner, a vaudevillian, is away for the night. A little bird emerges from the vaudevillian's top hat and throws the bone away in spite for disturbing his sleep after the two puppies crash into a prop.

The bone rolls onto a see-saw which the puppies accidentally launch into a tight rope. They repeatedly launch each other onto the tightrope as the bone finds its way into the seal's tank. The seal exploits the opportunity to trick both puppies amidst their confusion. At one point, the larger puppy accidentally bites and spits out the bone into the top hat to its horror, as the little bird bullies it into dropping the bone. The seal tosses both puppies into the air. The smaller puppy stumbles towards the bone but is too stunned to grab it properly. Just as it succeeds, the seal sends the larger puppy flying into the smaller puppy, causing the bone to be thrown into the top hat again. The little bird emerges and begrudgingly splits the bone in half to appease both puppies.
