= Katnip Kollege =

1938 film by Cal Howard and Cal Dalton

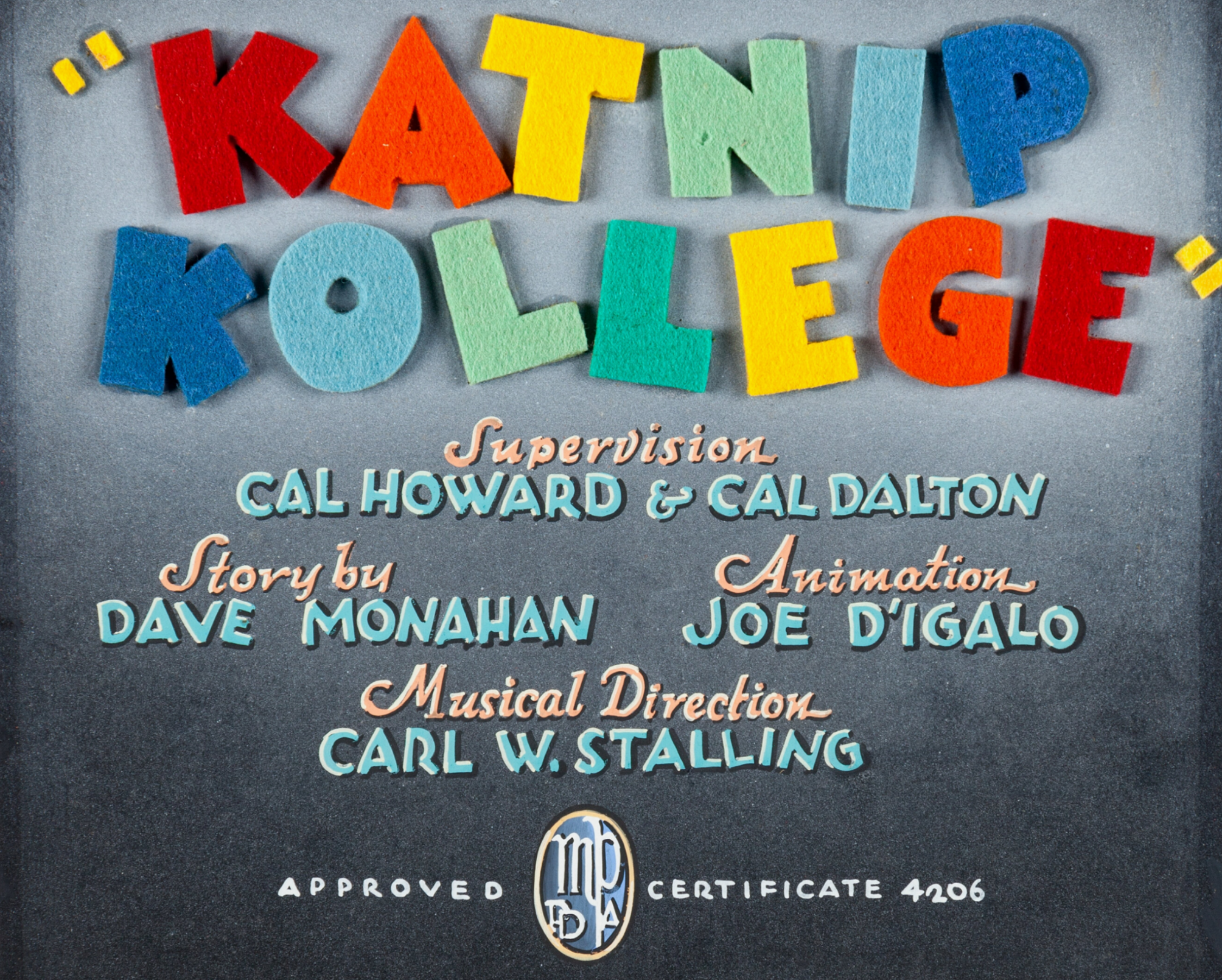
- Original title card
- Directed by: Cal Howard; Cal Dalton
- Story by: Dave Monahan
- Produced by: Leon Schlesinger
- Starring: Mel Blanc; Johnnie Davis; George MacFarland; Fred Waring Gee Club; Mabel Todd
- Music by: Carl W. Stalling
- Animation by: Joe D'Igalo
- Color process: Technicolor
- Production company: Leon Schlesinger Productions
- Distributed by: Warner Bros. Pictures; The Vitaphone Corporation
- Release date: June 11, 1938
- Running time: 7 min
- Country: United States
- Language: English

Katnip Kollege is a 1938 American animated comedy short film directed by Cal Howard and Cal Dalton. The short was released on June 11, 1938. It is the 96th film in the Merrie Melodies series. It was re-released as a "Blue Ribbon" reissue in 1945, rendering the original film lost, though a cel of the original title card was kept.

== Plot ==
Katnip Kollege offers a series of courses, including "Swingology" (swing music). The Professor (a parody of Kay Kyser) requires each student to sing their lessons to a jazz rhythm. Johnny Cat struggles and is forced to stay after class wearing the dunce cap. Kitty Bright returns his fraternity ring as she leaves the room, telling him to call her when he learns how to swing.

That night, as all the other cats jam at an outdoor caterwaul, Johnny is suddenly inspired by the rhythm of a pendulum clock. He runs to join the group and shocks everyone with a flawlessly jazzy rendition of "Easy as Rollin' Off a Log" sung (and trumpeted) to Kitty. At the end of the song the two cats actually roll off the log they were using as a stage, and Kitty covers Johnny's face with kisses.
