= Nagasaki (song) =

1928 song by Harry Warren and Mort Dixon

Song
- Released: 1928
- Genre: Novelty; jazz
- Composer: Harry Warren
- Lyricist: Mort Dixon

"Nagasaki" is a 1928 jazz song composed by Harry Warren with lyrics by Mort Dixon, which became a popular Tin Pan Alley hit. The silly, bawdy lyrics have only the vaguest relation to the Japanese port city of Nagasaki; part of the humor is realising that the speaker obviously knows very little about the place and is just making it up. It was one of a series of U.S. novelty songs set in "exotic" locations popular in the era, starting with Albert Von Tilzer's 1919 hit "Oh By Jingo!"; "Nagasaki" even makes reference to the genre's prototype in the lyrics. Even more directly, the song "On the Isle of Wicki Wacki Woo" was written by Walter Donaldson and Gus Kahn in 1923.

"Nagasaki" was covered by many big band jazz groups of the late 1920s through the 1940s, and the music remains to this day a popular base for jazz improvisations. The song was most famously covered by the Benny Goodman Quartet in 1952. Others who performed the song include the Mills Brothers, Fats Waller, Billy Costello, Fletcher Henderson, Cab Calloway, Nat Gonella, Gene Krupa, Don Redman, Django Reinhardt, Louis Jordan, Adolph Robinson, Stéphane Grappelli, Chet Atkins, and organist George Wright. Willie "the Lion" Smith performed and recorded the song throughout his career, although he sang different lyrics that he changed back in his vaudeville days.

Writing for Time magazine, Richard Corliss described "Nagasaki" as "something like the definitive gotta-get-up-and-do-the-Charleston song, with Warren's effervescent syncopation dragging the folks onto the dance floor and Mort Dixon's lyric goading them into a singalong: 'Hot ginger and dynamite / There's nothing but that at night / Back in Nagasaki where the fellas chew tobaccy / And the women wicky-wacky-woo'."

== Usage ==
The song appears in numerous film soundtracks including a feature in Major Bowes's Harmony Broadcast. A few of the numerous usages in animated cartoons include in Friz Freleng's 1937 Merrie Melodies Clean Pastures cartoon and in his "products come to life" short September in the Rain. The soundtrack for the clip was reused in Bob Clampett's 1943 Warner Brothers cartoon Tin Pan Alley Cats. The song was featured in the Warner Brothers movie My Dream Is Yours (1949) sung by Doris Day. It was revived in the early 1970s by the popular Australian group The Captain Matchbox Whoopee Band, who performed it regularly in concert and included their frenetic "jug band" version on their debut album Smoke Dreams (1973). The song was also played by Hugh Laurie in the British comedy series Jeeves and Wooster and was recorded by Laurie for the accompanying soundtrack CD. It was the finale for the independent feature film Man of the Century and also briefly appears in a nightclub scene in Woody Allen's 1994 film Bullets Over Broadway. Rickie Lee Jones recorded a version of "Nagasaki" for her 2019 album of cover songs, "Kicks". In addition, the song was used in the series Sanford and Son season 3, episode 13, "Wine, Women, & Aunt Esther". Following the passing of one of their friends, Fred and his friends (Grady, Skillet, and Leroy) decide to start throwing wild parties—against Lamont's wishes. Fred (Redd Foxx) sings a portion of "Nagasaki" while cleaning up the living room after the decision to live it up was made.

== See also ==
- List of 1920s jazz standards
