= I Only Have Eyes for You (film) =

1937 film by Fred Avery

- Original title card
- Directed by: Fred Avery
- Produced by: Leon Schlesinger
- Starring: Elvia Allman; Joe Twerp; Tedd Pierce; Billy Paye; The Rhythmettes
- Edited by: Treg Brown
- Music by: Carl W. Stalling
- Animation by: Bob Clampett; Virgil Ross
- Color process: Technicolor
- Production company: Leon Schlesinger Productions
- Distributed by: Warner Bros. Productions; The Vitaphone Corporation
- Release date: February 27, 1937
- Running time: 8 minutes
- Country: United States
- Language: English

I Only Have Eyes for You is a 1937 American animated comedy short film directed by Fred Avery. The short was released on February 27, 1937. It is the 70th film in the Merrie Melodies series, featuring the song of the same name. Its working title was "I Only Have Ice for You". It was re-released as a "Blue Ribbon" reissue in 1947, rendering the original film lost; Avery kept a nitrate fragment of the original titles, which was sold by his family in 2004 to a private collector, but still available publicly at extremely low definition.

== Plot ==
An iceman bird is wooed by Tizzy Tash, who attempts to entice him with a wide variety of foods she cooked with her exceptional skills. The iceman, on the other hand, only has eyes for Katie Canary (a caricature of Katharine Hepburn), who is in love with a radio crooner, so he sneaks ice into Tizzy's house, chased and slams a door on her to leave quickly. He attempts to flirt with Katie, only to be ignored and rebuffed as Katie listens to a crooner and wants to marry one.

The iceman tries to hone his crooning skills, only to find the shop of Professor Mockingbird, a ventriloquist and imitator who demonstrates a wide range of music and sound effects and is promptly hired to croon the titular song while hiding in the back of the ice truck as the iceman lip-syncs. After he woos Katie, Mockingbird struggles to sing in the extreme cold, causing Katie to realize his ruse, which is revealed when Mockingbird sneezes the top of the truck off. Katie takes in Mockingbird and nurses him, having fallen in love with him, while the radio is replaced with an electric refrigerator in order to avoid the iceman's services. Some time later, the iceman marries Tizzy, noting her cooking ability to be a net positive despite her looks.

== Home media ==
The film is available on the Looney Tunes Collector's Choice: Volume 3 Blu-ray.
