= Mighty Hunters =

1940 film by Charles Jones

- Title card
- Directed by: Charles Jones
- Story by: Dave Monahan
- Based on: Canyon Kiddies by Jimmy Swinnerton
- Produced by: Leon Schlesinger
- Music by: Carl W. Stalling
- Animation by: Ken Harris
- Backgrounds by: Jimmy Swinnerton
- Color process: Technicolor
- Production company: Leon Schlesinger Productions
- Distributed by: Warner Bros. Pictures
- Release date: January 27, 1940
- Running time: 8 min
- Country: United States
- Language: English

Mighty Hunters is a 1940 American animated comedy short film directed by Charles Jones. The short was released on January 27, 1940. It is part of the Merrie Melodies series and the first to be an adaptation of an existing property, namely Jimmy Swinnerton's comic strip Canyon Kiddies, published by Hearst Corporation in their magazine Good Housekeeping. It was re-released as a "Blue Ribbon" reissue in 1953, rendering the original film lost, though the credits are retained due to contractual obligations with Swinnerton.

== Plot ==
A group of Native American children dance around a fireplace while others play instruments until a drummer falls into his drum. They then go out to hunt, including one child who is forced to babysit his infant sibling by his parent. The drummer lags behind and tries to ride a donkey, who continuously thwarts his attempts while eating cactus.

Two children try to hunt a squirrel with bows and arrows to no avail. A bear follows the babysitting child and his infant brother solely to lick the latter's candy cane, causing the latter to whack the bear with the candy cane. They eventually meet the squirrel-hunting children, who alert him of the bear. They almost fall off a cliff while the bear successfully acquires the candy cane by falling on two branches. The children return home with nothing, except for the drummer, who is still trying to bring home the donkey.

== Production ==
The film was produced to start a potential spin-off animated film series based on the comic strip. Director Charles Jones was appointed to direct the film due to his gentler and Disney-esque direction style; he travelled with his animators to an Indian reservation in Arizona for research. Swinnerton helped with painting the film's oil painting backgrounds, instead of the series' usual watercolor painting backgrounds, in addition to promotional art. Despite receiving wider publicity and a higher budget than other Merrie Melodies cartoons, the film was financially unsuccessful, leading to the planned series' cancellation and the comic strip's retirement in 1941.
