= Old Glory (film) =

1939 film by Charles Jones

- 1953 Blue Ribbon reissue title card
- Directed by: Charles Jones
- Produced by: Leon Schlesinger
- Starring: Mel Blanc; John Deering; Tedd Pierce
- Music by: Carl W. Stalling
- Animation by: Bob McKimson
- Color process: Technicolor
- Production company: Leon Schlesinger Productions
- Distributed by: Warner Bros. Pictures
- Release date: July 1, 1939
- Running time: 9 min
- Language: English

Old Glory is a 1939 American animated propaganda short film directed by Charles Jones. The short was released on July 1, 1939. It is part of the Merrie Melodies series and the 60th cartoon to feature Porky Pig. It was also the second color film in the Merrie Melodies series to feature Porky, following the character's debut in I Haven't Got a Hat (1935). The cartoon was commissioned by Warner Bros. as a counterpart for a series of live-action films about American patriotism. It was re-released as a "Blue Ribbon" reissue in 1945 and 1953, rendering the original film and credits lost.

The short documents notable events in American history, depicting Uncle Sam teaching Porky Pig about the past of their country. The narrative includes brief depictions of Colonial America, the American Revolutionary War, and the American Old West, and an allusion to the Presidency of Abraham Lincoln. The human figures are depicted in a realistic style, with scenes rotoscoped from the live-action films Give Me Liberty (1936) and Declaration of Independence (1938).

== Plot ==
Porky Pig attempts to learn the Pledge of Allegiance but becomes bored and falls asleep. In his dream, Uncle Sam comes to life and teaches Porky about history from Colonial America through the midnight ride of Paul Revere and the American Revolutionary War to the expansion of the American Old West, briefly alluding to Abraham Lincoln. Upon awakening, Porky snaps into a salute and recites the pledge as the Flag of the United States waves overhead.

== Production ==
The animation in Old Glory is realistic and heavily rotoscoped, different from the usual Warner Bros. style. Director Chuck Jones was known for his Disney-like style during this period, and Schlesinger assigned him to make this cartoon for that reason. The scene with Patrick Henry (voiced by John Litel) saying his "Give Me Liberty" speech was rotoscoped from the Warner Bros. color two-reel historical short Give Me Liberty. That short won the Academy Award for Best Short Subject - Color of 1936. Also rotoscoped were scenes from the live-action short Declaration of Independence (1938).

There were many different tones of colored inks used on the film. Uncle Sam has different tones on his hat, beard, face, and clothes. All the other characters were treated in a similar manner. There were many cels depicting the Flag of the United States in its stars and stripes.

The film was produced during a heat wave in Los Angeles. On account of the lack of air conditioning at the studio, the production staff initially relied on two large fans to keep cool. They had to be pointed at the ceiling so that they did not blow cels and drawings across the room. Eventually production moved to night time, since the temperature dropped at night.

Old Glory is Jones's first short to feature Porky Pig. It is also Porky's first appearance in a color Merrie Melodies entry since his debut in I Haven't Got a Hat (1935), and his first short in three-strip Technicolor.

Most Leon Schlesinger animated shorts were first screened at the Warner Bros. Theater at the Hollywood Boulevard. This film was instead screened at the more prestigious Carthay Circle Theatre. All animation studio employees were invited to attend. The film was screened alongside the live-action Dark Victory.

== Legacy ==
The original ending was cut when the cartoon was reissued as a Blue Ribbon Merrie Melodies short, in 1945 and 1953. In 2004, the short was restored for the Looney Tunes Golden Collection: Volume 2 DVD release. While this version retains the Blue Ribbon opening titles, it restores the original ending flagshot scene with the Leon Schlesinger titles. This restored version is also featured on Looney Tunes Platinum Collection: Volume 1 and Porky Pig 101.

During the late 1960s, Old Glory was regularly screened between rock acts at The Fillmore in San Francisco. Many of the Fillmore's patrons drew great amusement from a pig saluting the American flag, as "pig" in 1960s slang was, and remains, a derogatory term for a police officer and his saluting the flag was a symbol of the kind of America some were against at the time.

== See also ==
- Porky Pig filmography
- Looney Tunes and Merrie Melodies filmography (1930–1939)
