= Wacky Wild Life =

1940 film by Fred Avery

- Black and white title card
- Directed by: Fred Avery
- Story by: Dave Monahan
- Produced by: Leon Schlesinger
- Starring: Mel Blanc
- Narrated by: Robert C. Bruce
- Music by: Carl W. Stalling
- Animation by: Virgil Ross
- Color process: Technicolor
- Production company: Leon Schlesinger Productions
- Distributed by: Warner Bros. Pictures
- Release date: November 9, 1940
- Running time: 7 min
- Country: United States
- Language: English

Wacky Wild Life is a 1940 American animated comedy short film directed by Fred Avery. It was released on November 9, 1940. It is part of the Merrie Melodies series. It was re-released as a "Blue Ribbon" reissue in 1953 as Wacky Wildlife, rendering the original film lost; Avery kept a nitrate fragment of the original titles, which was sold by his family in 2004 to a private collector, but still available publicly at extremely low definition.

== Plot ==
The film depicts various unrelated visual gags involving animals.

A fawn is described to be shy, only to quickly chug water at a lake and choke on the water. A snake hypnotizes a bird to walk into his jaw and be eaten, not realizing that the bird is conscious and walks away after it comments on the ploy's stupidity. A skunk walks by while its shadow is irritated by its scent. A bobcat and a tomcat meet and are humorously both named Bob and Tom. A crane walks with one foot's toes. A pack rat steals an egg and replaces it with an acorn out of habit of replacing items it steals, but then does the reverse after desiring the acorn too, commenting on how monotonous its actions are.

At the Everglades, an alligator with a body disproportionately smaller than its head is shown much to the surprise of the narrator. A mother bird attempts to scold her child, who is tired of her using bird-talk. In Montana, the narrator clamors a leg of lamb, only for a grazing lamb to reveal her leg in a striptease sequence. A pig rolls in mud and nonchalantly responds when the narrator comments on his dirtiness. In Louisiana, a duck refuses to leave when a hunter shoots its peers, having somehow placed a United States flag on his feathers which would deter hunters from destroying it. In California, a termite single-handedly destroys a California redwood tree. In Texas, a horse is forced to stand upright by its cowboy owner. A coyote howls for its mate by yelling humorously. A camel is described to be able to survive weeks without food and water, annoying it as it states itself to be thirsty. A wild dog, when asked about why he is wild, states his displeasure against deforestation.
