= Speaking of the Weather =

1937 film by Frank Tashlin

- Original title card
- Directed by: Frank Tashlin
- Produced by: Leon Schlesinger
- Starring: Mel Blanc; Billy Bletcher; Tex Avery; Danny Webb
- Music by: Carl W. Stalling
- Animation by: Joe D'Igalo; Volney White
- Color process: Technicolor
- Production company: Leon Schlesinger Productions
- Distributed by: Warner Bros. Productions; The Vitaphone Corporation
- Release date: September 4, 1937
- Running time: 7 min
- Country: United States
- Language: English

Speaking of the Weather is a 1937 American animated comedy short film directed by Frank Tashlin. It was released on September 4, 1937. It is the 81st film in the Merrie Melodies series, featuring the titular song from the film Gold Diggers of 1937. It is the first film directed by Tashlin to be in color. It was re-released as a "Blue Ribbon" reissue in 1945.

== Plot ==
A drugstore closes for the night, with mascots on unsold magazines coming to life. A caricature of Bob Burns, plays and breaks his bazooka before introducing a caricature of Ted Lewis, who plays the titular song. A caricature of Leopold Stokowski leads the Storm movement from the William Tell Overture. After this, the title song is sung by the Boswell Sisters. Lydia Pinkham ogles Clark Gable, Greta Garbo rocks on her large feet, while Hugh Herbert is seen repeatedly smiling and adjusting his necktie.

A bullish criminal on the cover of The Gang Magazine decides to use a blowtorch from the cover of Popular Mechanics to break into a safe on the cover of The Magazine of Wall Street. He is immediately arrested by Charlie Chan and, after explaining himself to the police on the cover of True Confessions, he is tried, and sentenced to Life. However, he escapes through the cover of Liberty; but his escape does not go unnoticed by Walter Winchell, who goes on air to summon police officers, Boy Scouts, Johnny Weissmuller portraying Tarzan and doing the Tarzan yell, wild animals, and native Zulu tribesmen, joining the chase. The Thin Man and a dog on the cover of Dog World try to find the criminal, who is disguised as a baby on the cover of Better Babies, but are subdued. The criminal then is assailed by everyone from Navy battleships to Greta Garbo (who trips him with her large feet) and even Saint Nicholas. He ultimately ends up imprisoned behind the bars on the cover of Twenty Thousand Years in Sing Sing, and when Herbert laughs, the criminal uses a globe from the cover of a World Almanac to hit him in the head, mocking his laugh and expression behind bars.

== Reception ==
Motion Picture Exhibitor (Aug 15, 1937): "The pictures on the covers come to life. The Thug on the gang magazine cover robs the bank on Wall Street Magazine, is jailed on Life, breaks jail from Liberty, is pursued and captured by a mob of characters from other magazines. The ideas are funny, the color excellent, the pace fast. The take-offs on some popular characters are hilarious."

Motion Picture Herald (Aug 21, 1937): "This probably will be acclaimed as one of the finest jobs yet accomplished in the animated cartoon field. It will richly deserve this distinction for it is vastly entertaining and the product of a most fertile mind. All the action takes place in a magazine store, after hours. The magazines come to life, and the result is decidedly pleasing to watch."

== Home media ==
The short was released on disc 2 of the Looney Tunes Golden Collection: Volume 3 DVD set.
