= Early to Bet =

Early To Bet
- Title card
- Directed by: Robert McKimson
- Story by: Warren Foster
- Starring: Mel Blanc; Stan Freberg (uncredited)
- Music by: Carl Stalling
- Animation by: Phil DeLara; Emery Hawkins; Charles McKimson; Rod Scribner
- Layouts by: Cornett Wood
- Backgrounds by: Richard H. Thomas
- Color process: Technicolor
- Production company: Warner Bros. Cartoons
- Distributed by: Warner Bros. Pictures
- Release date: May 12, 1951
- Running time: 6:48
- Country: United States
- Language: English

Early to Bet is a 1951 Warner Bros. Merrie Melodies theatrical cartoon short directed by Robert McKimson. The short was released on May 12, 1951, and features the Gambling Bug, as well as the second appearance of the tuxedo cat and the bulldog previously seen in the 1950 short It's Hummer Time.

In the film, the bug spreads "gambling fever" to people, giving them an irresistible urge for gambling. When a cat decides to quit playing cards with a card sharp (a bulldog), the bug decides to infect it with his fever. The cat agrees to play games where the loser is subjected to various forms of punishment.

== Plot ==
The narrator introduces the Gambling Bug, demanding he stand up so everyone can get a look at him. Three examples are then offered, showing what happens should this Gambling Bug "bite" someone, giving them "gambling fever". First, a restaurant customer is seen coaxing a frustrated waiter (named Luigi) to allow another in what has clearly been a series of coin flips to determine payment for a meal. Next, two men at a bar bet five dollars ("five bucks") that a buzzing fly will land on one or another glass of beer first. Then, another man puts a coin in a casino slot machine and watches the wheels spin around until three oranges appear. He jumps for joy until he sees the payout is three actual oranges instead of a money jackpot. Enraged, he begins punching the slot machine.

After that introductory segment closes with a somber warning for "folks" (the audience) to watch out for the Gambling Bug, the bug chooses to leave his victims alone for a day, and goes on vacation. Out walking, the bug is surprised by a dog who strides by and pulls a black and white cat from beneath a farm building. The dog, apparently a card shark, suggests the cat might like to play cards for penalties. The cat adamantly refuses, says he is through playing cards with the dog and, somewhat irritated, goes to sit on a nearby log. The Gambling Bug immediately sees this as an irresistible opportunity and bites the cat's ear.

Now the cat, wound-up and anxious to bet, dashes back to the dog repeating, "Gimme the cards, deal 'em out, let's go, come on!" They play gin rummy for penalties and the cat promptly loses. After he briefly transforms into a "sucker" (a lollipop), he dejectedly heads over to and spins the Penalty Wheel. He lands on Number 14: "The Gesundheit", which he finds out when picking the appropriate file out of a nearby file drawer. He begs not to be punished with Raymond Scott's Powerhouse (section B) music as background, still he is forced to blow bubble gum as the dog shakes "sneeze powder" (pepper) on his nose; the resulting huge sneeze causes the bubble gum to completely cover the cat. After the dog says 'Gesundheit', the cat becomes enraged and tries to break free from the gum.

The cat refuses to play cards any longer and sits back down on the log. The Gambling Bug speaks into his ear, "We gotta play percentage. We'll try again," and bites the cat's ear again. Excitedly looking to get even, he sits down with the dog once more and, in spite of trying to play smart, instantly loses again. This time the Penalty Wheel lands on Number 75: "The William Tell". This entails the dog using a bow to fire, Robin Hood-like, a toilet plunger at an apple on the cat's head. The cat ensures the biggest apple possible is poised so the dog will not miss, but the plunger is aimed, successfully, into the cat's face. The cat pulls the plunger off his face and starts jumping on it in anger.

Before biting the ear a third time, the Gambling Bug suggests the cat is due for a winning streak. But, as the bug is saying to himself, "He can't lose all the time," we hear the dog announce, "Gin again." The bug replies "Or can he?". The Penalty Wheel stops at Number 36: "Roll Out the Barrel". The dog fires a starter pistol and the cat rolls a barrel, trailing gunpowder, along a hilly road into the distance. The dog puts a match to the powder, which burns exceptionally quickly and blows the cat back to where he started.

Hobbling up with a broken leg, and influenced yet again by the Gambling Bug's bite, the cat tries to play but the dog refuses, declaring the cat too unlucky and walks out, saying, "I'm quitting before you kills yourself." The bug steps in and suggests he and the cat cut the deck for the highest card. The cat draws a three of hearts. The Gambling Bug says, "Not so good, cat. Watch!" and is shocked when he ends up drawing a two of diamonds. The cat decides the penalty will be "The Post", which means he will attempt to whack the Gambling Bug with a Post newspaper. The cat achieves his redemption and proceeds to attempt whacking the Gambling Bug as a form of payback for everything the Gambling Bug put him through as the cartoon ends.

== Production notes ==
The title of this short is a play on Benjamin Franklin's famous quote: "Early to bed and early to rise, makes a man healthy, wealthy, and wise".

The Gambling Bug is a small character who infects others with the desire to gamble. He wears a green tie, a red jacket, a brown hat and a white tuxedo. Early to Bet is his only appearance in the Golden Age of American Animation. He would make a brief cameo appearance at the basketball game in Space Jam.

The cartoon is a sequel to the 1950 short It's Hummer Time, which featured the same bulldog giving the same cat elaborate punishments.

Early to Bet marks the bulldog's fourth and final overall cartoon appearance in the Golden Age of American Animation, and the second overall alongside the tuxedo cat, having previously appeared alongside Sylvester and Hippety Hopper in Hop, Look and Listen and Hippety Hopper as the antagonist, and alongside an unnamed fox in A Fox in a Fix, the latter having been released a few months before this cartoon. While the cat made his second appearance in A Fractured Leghorn and would make his final one later in Leghorn Swoggled; none of them were given names.

== Home media ==
Early to Bet was released on DVD in 2003 as part of Looney Tunes Golden Collection: Volume 1.
