= The Cat's Tale =

1941 film by Isadore Freleng

- Original title card
- Directed by: Isadore Freleng
- Story by: Michael Maltese
- Produced by: Leon Schlesinger
- Starring: Mel Blanc
- Music by: Carl W. Stalling
- Animation by: Herman Cohen
- Production company: Leon Schlesinger Productions
- Distributed by: Warner Bros. Pictures
- Release date: March 1, 1941
- Running time: 8 min
- Country: United States
- Language: English

The Cat's Tale is a 1941 American animated comedy short film directed by Isadore Freleng. It was released on March 1, 1941. It is part of the Merrie Melodies series. It was re-released as a "Blue Ribbon" reissue in 1947, rendering the original film lost; storyman Michael Maltese kept a cel and background of the credits.

== Plot ==
A cat chases a mouse, destroying valuables in the process. At his mousehole, the mouse declares he has had enough and demands answers from the cat. The cat comes to the conclusion that he chases mice simply because dogs also chase cats. The mouse convinces the cat to negotiate with the dog to stop chasing him in the same manner.

The cat approaches Spike the bulldog, who ignores him while chewing on a bone. In his anger, the cat accidentally kicks Spike's water bowl into him, cleaning up the mess to prevent more aggression. Spike chases the cat into the house, with most of the action off-screen.

The mouse files his nails on the cat's bed while the injured cat approaches him. The cat chases the mouse into the mousehole again. The mouse repeats his monologue from the beginning of the film but accepts his fate.
