= Snow Time for Comedy =

1941 film by Charles M. Jones

- Directed by: Charles M. Jones
- Story by: Rich Hogan
- Produced by: Leon Schlesinger
- Music by: Carl W. Stalling
- Animation by: Robert Cannon
- Color process: Technicolor
- Production company: Leon Schlesinger Productions
- Distributed by: Warner Bros. Pictures
- Release date: August 30, 1941
- Running time: 7 min
- Country: United States
- Language: English

Snow Time for Comedy is a 1941 American animated comedy short film directed by Charles M. Jones. It was released on August 30, 1941. It is part of the Merrie Melodies series and the fifth cartoon to feature the Two Curious Puppies. It was re-released as a "Blue Ribbon" reissue in 1952 as Snowtime for Comedy, rendering the original film and credits lost. It reflects a change in direction in Jones' cartoons, particularly those involving the Two Curious Puppies, switching from Disney-like storytelling to faster-paced slapstick comedy.

== Plot ==
The Two Curious Puppies chase each other across a winter landscape for a bone. They accidentally go on a ski jump and slide across the ice until the smaller puppy floats on ice on a river, which melts as he struggles to keep afloat. The larger puppy destroys a beaver's dam and hits a tree. He is unable to walk properly but tries to walk towards the bone to no avail. He does slide to the bone, but immediately slides backwards into the tree again. He tries again but destroys another dam set up by the beaver. The smaller puppy runs into the tree to escape the cracking ice, running into another dam in the process. The larger puppy falls into the river and has his hind legs frozen shut. He releases his feet but has his face and front legs, then eventually his tail, jammed into the ice. The smaller puppy runs over another dam and finds the bone on a ski lift. He eventually finds the bone, but rolls down a slope so quickly an avalanche is formed. The beaver hides under a tree, only to find the avalanche having built a dam out of snow, with the two puppies emerging humiliated.
