= The Bug Parade =

1941 film by Fred Avery

- Directed by: Fred Avery (uncredited)
- Story by: Dave Monahan
- Produced by: Leon Schlesinger
- Music by: Carl W. Stalling
- Animation by: Rod Scribner
- Color process: Technicolor
- Production company: Leon Schlesinger Productions
- Distributed by: Warner Bros. Pictures
- Release date: October 11, 1941
- Running time: 7 min
- Country: United States
- Language: English

The Bug Parade is a 1941 American animated comedy short film directed by Fred Avery. The cartoon was released on October 11, 1941. It is part of the Merrie Melodies series and the final cartoon to be directed solely by Avery, as he left Leon Schlesinger Productions over a dispute concerning the ending of The Heckling Hare. It was re-released as a "Blue Ribbon" reissue in 1952 as Bug Parade, rendering the original film and credits lost.

== Plot ==
The cartoon is a series of unrelated gags involving insects.

A housefly walks on a house's ceiling with literal plungers as feet. His eyes are humorously revealed to be thousands of human eyes. A horsefly flies slower than his peers as he was apparently hanging around horses bet on by Bing Crosby (who was infamous for losing bets on slow horses).

A female wasp walks gracefully until she is undressed, revealing her to be obese. A queen bee lays an unusually large amount of eggs. A spider traps a cow in his web, despite the cow being numerous times his body size. A firefly cannot glow as he had apparently neglected a "light bill". Two caterpillars shake their limbs ten times in order to shake them all. The narrator lights a piece of paper on fire to attract a moth, who stops the fire and reprimands the narrator for attempting to start a wildfire.

A grasshopper jumps unexpectedly high, only to be eaten by a bird, but survives and jumps inside the bird. A centipede walks with its limbs in unison except for the hind limbs, which the centipede punishes by literally detaching his hand and front limbs, kick it from behind and leave it behind. A "common cooty" (fictional insect based on cooties) finds a military camp and is ecstatic about spreading diseases to soldiers.

A snail's shell is apparently loaned by the Federal Housing Administration. A termite bites its way through two trees, but is unable to bite a petrified tree. Silkworms protest the opening of a nylon factory for stealing their livelihoods. A red ant greets a black ant. More red ants say "bread and butter" to each other. A spider romances a female fly instead of eating it.

== See also ==
- Looney Tunes and Merrie Melodies filmography (1940–1949)
