= September in the Rain (film) =

1937 film by Isadore Freleng

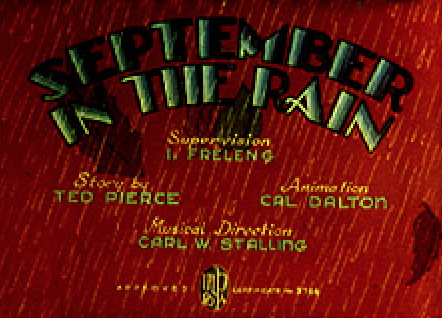
- Original title card
- Directed by: Isadore Freleng
- Story by: Ted Pierce
- Produced by: Leon Schlesinger
- Starring: Mel Blanc; Danny Webb; Wini Shaw; James C. Morton (all uncredited)
- Music by: Carl W. Stalling
- Animation by: Cal Dalton
- Color process: Technicolor
- Production company: Leon Schlesinger Productions
- Distributed by: Warner Bros. Productions; The Vitaphone Corporation
- Release date: December 18, 1937
- Running time: 5 min
- Country: United States
- Language: English

September in the Rain is a 1937 American animated comedy short film directed by Isadore Freleng. The short was released on December 18, 1937. It is the 87th film in the Merrie Melodies series. Timed at 5 minutes and 50 seconds, September in the Rain is one of the shortest films in the series. It was re-released as a "Blue Ribbon" reissue in 1944, which removed scenes containing offensive racial stereotypes, cutting down the runtime to a measly 4 minutes. While it contains less racial stereotypes than those of the Censored Eleven films, it remains unreleased on home media and television.

== Plot ==
The items in a grocery store come to life after it closes for the night. A bottle of blueing sings "Am I Blue?". Next, a white-bearded fakir plays a pungi-like instrument, causing a tube of toothpaste to squeeze out a stream of snake-dancing paste. A can named "Searchlight" features a lighthouse that shines light outside the can. Four mascots on "Old Maid Cleanser" cans dance. A rubber glove dances while a camel mascot and kilt-wearing thistles dance. A worm emerges from an apple, only to be chased by chick mascots and eaten by one of them, but it escapes into another apple.

A box of Shredded Wheat rains on an umbrella-holding girl mascot, who sings "By a Waterfall" with a fireman boy mascot. A caricature of Al Jolson in blackface sings September in the Rain", greeting Aunt Emma (a parody of Aunt Jemima) and points toward of a container of Log Cabin syrup. Caricatures of Ginger Rogers and Fred Astaire on cigarette boxes. Caricatures of Fats Waller and Louis Armstrong play instruments and sing "Nagasaki", while Aunt Emma and other mascots in blackface dance to it. The moves back to the big storefront window and irises out on the rainy night sky.

== Reception ==
The Film Daily (December 12, 1937): "In this cartoon done in Technicolor, the scene is a grocery store after closing time, with the rain pouring down. The fantasy has all the trade-marked characters on the labels of boxes and cans come to life and join in a party staged to swing music. The musical revue is cleverly handled, with a lot of well known advertised goods thinly disguised getting a nice plug, intentional or otherwise. Who knows? Who cares? It is smartly done."

Motion Picture Exhibitor (January 1, 1938): "No plot this time, just some take-offs on nationally advertized [sic] goods with slight variation. Animation is nice; a burlesque on Jolson is clever; gags are up to the usual high standard, but short lacks the sock quality of some of the series."

Boxoffice (February 5, 1938): "A cheerful and pleasing fantasy which takes place in a grocery store. The familiar trademarks and symbols on the various products come to life and participate in a musical revue set to swing music. The cartoon is conceived in a gay and light manner."

== See also ==
- Clean Pastures, an earlier 1937 Freleng cartoon with stereotyped caricatures of Armstrong and Waller
- Tin Pan Alley Cats, a later Merrie Melodies cartoon re-using animation from September in the Rain

== Sources ==
- Barrier, Michael (2003). "Warner Bros., 1941-1945". Hollywood Cartoons : American Animation in Its Golden Age: American Animation in Its Golden Age. Oxford University Press. ISBN 9780198020790.
- Lehman, Christopher P. (2007). "Black Characterizations". The Colored Cartoon: Black Representation in American Animated Short Films, 1907-1954. University of Massachusetts Press. ISBN 9781558497795.
- Stausbauch, John (2007), "Black & White Film", Black Like You: Blackface, Whiteface, Insult & Imitation in American Popular Culture, Penguin Group, ISBN 978-1101216057
