= The Fighting 69th½ =

1941 film by Isadore Freleng

- Directed by: Isadore Freleng
- Story by: Jack Miller
- Produced by: Leon Schlesinger
- Music by: Carl W. Stalling
- Animation by: Gil Turner
- Color process: Technicolor
- Production company: Leon Schlesinger Productions
- Distributed by: Warner Bros. Pictures
- Release date: January 18, 1941
- Running time: 7 min
- Country: United States
- Language: English

The Fighting 69th½ is a 1941 American animated comedy short film directed by Isadore Freleng. The short was released on January 4, 1941. It is part of the Merrie Melodies series. It was re-released as a "Blue Ribbon" reissue in 1943 and 1953 as The Fighting 69½th, rendering the original film and credits lost.

== Plot ==
Red ants and black ants spot an abandoned picnic meal. A red ant and black ant fight over an olive until the red ant smashes it into the black ant, who proclaims war. Both parties prepare their armaments, including soldier ants, caterpillars carrying insect powder, absorbent cotton and flying ants.

Some red ants navigate the battlefield and hide in a sandwich and Limburger cheese (which is treated as a bioweapon) to avoid bombings. They steal a hot dog, only to be ambushed by black ants hiding inside. Red ants steal a cake, while black ants steal fruit; a diminutive black ant is shown to be stronger than its peers, stealing an entire watermelon. Red ants prepare a sandwich, but is made to hold the onions and continue without it.

To the ants' horror, a woman retrieves the picnic food, but accidentally drop a cake which they fight over. The ants' leaders decide to start a peace conference, but end up fighting over who gets to share the cherry on top.

== Reception ==
Motion Picture Herald called the film "cleverly thought out and executed".

== Home media ==
This short is available as an unrestored extra on disc 2 of the Looney Tunes Golden Collection: Volume 6 DVD set.
