= The Night Watchman (1938 film) =

1938 film by Charles Jones

- Original title card
- Directed by: Charles Jones
- Story by: Ted Pierce
- Produced by: Leon Schlesinger
- Starring: Mel Blanc; Margaret Hill-Talbot
- Music by: Carl W. Stalling
- Animation by: Ken Harris
- Color process: Technicolor
- Production company: Leon Schlesinger Productions
- Distributed by: Warner Bros. Pictures; The Vitaphone Corporation
- Release date: November 19, 1938
- Running time: 7 min
- Country: United States
- Language: English

The Night Watchman is a 1938 American animated comedy short film directed by Charles Jones. The short was released on November 19, 1938. It is part of the Merrie Melodies series and the first to be directed by Jones, who replaced Frank Tashlin and would become one of the series' most prominent directors. It was re-released as a "Blue Ribbon" reissue in 1946.

== Plot ==
A cat who watches over the kitchen at night in pursuit of mice gets sick, so he requests that his clumsy son Thomas take over for one night. Thomas makes his way to the kitchen after breaking various objects, where he meets a gangster rat, who realizes that Thomas is of no threat when he innocently tells them of his father's situation. He and his friends immediately devour food in humorous manner.

Thomas fails to make his presence known and scare away the rats, even mockingly made to assist a rat while he cooks and serve a steak to the gangster rat. The rats perform a musical routine, but are disrupted by Thomas, who tries to stop them, but is pummeled backwards. His conscience convinces him to muster the courage and beat up the rats. He uses a plunger to force the gangster rat into returning a button he stole earlier in the film.

== Home media ==
The Night Watchman is available with original titles restored on Disc 4 of the Looney Tunes Golden Collection: Volume 4 DVD set.

== Voice cast ==
- Mel Blanc as Hoodlum Rats, Thomas Cat, Thomas's father
- Margaret Hill-Talbot as Thomas Cat
- The Paul Taylor Group as the singing rat quartet
