= Ain't We Got Fun (film) =

1937 film by Fred Avery

- Directed by: Fred Avery
- Produced by: Leon Schlesinger
- Starring: Mel Blanc; Billy Bletcher
- Music by: Carl W. Stalling
- Animation by: Charles Jones; Bob Clampett
- Color process: Technicolor
- Production company: Leon Schlesinger Productions
- Distributed by: Warner Bros. Productions; The Vitaphone Corporation
- Release date: May 1, 1937
- Running time: 8 min
- Country: United States
- Language: English

Ain't We Got Fun is a 1937 American animated comedy short film directed by Fred Avery. The cartoon was released on May 1, 1937. It is the 73rd film in the Merrie Melodies series, featuring the titular song. It was re-released as a "Blue Ribbon" reissue in 1945, rendering the original film and credits lost.

== Plot ==
A cat sleeps on an armchair, only to be chased to the carpet by his cantankerous owner. A mouse spots him sleeping, and uses a paper airplane scribbled with the message to announce it to other mice, who then come out to play. They sneak past the cat and run into the pantry, where secret elevators bring them to food. '

One mouse eats bread until he becomes morbidly obese. One plays billards with peas, with other mice eating the dropped peas. Another runs across mousetraps and gathers the cheese. Another tries to open a bottle of alcohol, but is trapped in a bottle by the cork. Another eats salami, but is trapped in the skin. The cat notices the commotion, but is implicated by the mice when they stuff food into his mouth. His owner angrily kicks him out of the house.

The mice frolic after the cat is disposed of, singing the titular song while gorging on even more food. They pelt the cat's owner with food after he awakens and discovers the mice, causing him to regret his decision and call for the cat to reenter the house, which him refuses until the mice mock him. The mice are then permanently disposed of as they run away from the house in horror. The cat's owner willingly sleeps on the carpet to allow the cat to sleep on the armchair as a reward, only to be pelted by a book.

== Home media ==
- LaserDisc - The Golden Age of Looney Tunes, Volume 5, Side 2 (USA 1995 Turner print)
- DVD - The Life of Emile Zola (unrestored; bonus feature)
