= Fagin's Freshmen =

1939 film by Ben Hardaway and Cal Dalton

- Directed by: Ben Hardaway; Cal Dalton
- Story by: Jack Miller
- Produced by: Leon Schlesinger
- Starring: Mel Blanc
- Music by: Carl W. Stalling
- Animation by: Rod Scribner
- Color process: Technicolor
- Production company: Leon Schlesinger Productions
- Distributed by: Warner Bros. Pictures
- Release date: November 12, 1939
- Running time: 7 min
- Country: United States
- Language: English

Fagin's Freshmen is a 1939 American animated comedy short film directed by Ben Hardaway and Cal Dalton. The short was released on November 12, 1939. It is part of the Merrie Melodies series. It was re-released as a "Blue Ribbon" reissue in 1950 as Fagin's Freshman, rendering the original film and credits lost.

== Plot ==
A cat and her children play the piano and sing "Three Little Kittens", except for one kitten, Blackie, who would rather listen to a crime radio program to his mother's chagrin. He is made to go to sleep and dreams of joining Fagin from Oliver Twist. Fagin brings Blackie to the classroom, where he meets other rebellious children and sees mugshots of former "students" of Fagin.

The children sing "We're Working Our Way Through College" while committing mock crimes such as robbing a mannequin resembling Elmer Fudd and failing to break into a fake safe. The police discover Fagin's hideout and start a shootout, which terrifies Blackie when he realizes the bullets are actually lethal and destroys Fagin's hat. Fagin stops the shooting by answering the call of one of the negligent policemen's wife, who demands her husband bring home a pound of butter. Blackie narrowly escapes gunfire and jumps out of the building, only to wake up from his dream. Realizing that crime is not as glamorous as it sounds, he runs down to apologize to his mother and sing.
