= The Fella with the Fiddle =

1937 film by Isadore Freleng

The Fella with a Fiddle
- Directed by: Isadore Freleng
- Produced by: Leon Schlesinger
- Starring: Mel Blanc; Billy Bletcher; Bernice Hansen
- Music by: Carl Stalling
- Animation by: Cal Dalton; Ken Harris
- Color process: Technicolor
- Production company: Leon Schlesinger Productions
- Distributed by: Warner Bros. Productions; The Vitaphone Corporation
- Release date: March 27, 1937
- Running time: 7 min
- Country: United States
- Language: English

The Fella with the Fiddle is a 1937 American animated comedy short film directed by Isadore Freleng. The short was released on March 27, 1937. It is the 71st film in the Merrie Melodies series. It was re-released as a "Blue Ribbon" reissue in 1945 as The Fella with a Fiddle, rendering the original film and credits lost. It is the first film in the series to credit Ken Harris, who would become one of the most prominent animators for the series under Chuck Jones.

== Plot ==
At J. Field Mouse's house, his grandchildren fight over a coin to get an ice cream. He then tells them a story to teach them the dangers of greed.

In the story, a seemingly blind mouse plays the fiddle for a living. He hits an individual who attempts to steal his earnings. Once he returns home, it is revealed that his blindness is a ruse that he exploits to collect money to live an opulent lifestyle. His home, marked by a shabby exterior, is in fact a mansion where he lives a lavish lifestyle with his riches

As the mouse plays with his coins, the tax assessor arrives to collect his due. The fiddler hurriedly activates a series of machinations to hide his opulence and make his home look like an impoverished hovel. As the tax assessor attempts to tax everything the mouse has, he activates the machinations, causing them to malfunction as they frantically switch between opulence and poverty. Unable to process the sights yet remaining suspicious, he leaves for a bit and returns, only to find the place to have remained impoverished. He then spots a cat and is horrified, running away while the cat spots the mouse playing with his coins again. The cat uses a coin to trap the mouse but fails, so it tricks him into taking a golden crown disguised as his tooth; as the mouse accidentally grabs one of the cat's teeth instead of the golden tooth, he then returns and is claimed to be successfully eaten.

As J. Field Mouse ends the story, one of his grandchildren finds a golden cat tooth on his necklace, realizing that the mouse in the story was actually J. Field Mouse, and that he modified the story to serve as a morality tale in spite of his hypocrisy.
