= I Love to Singa =

1936 film by Fred Avery

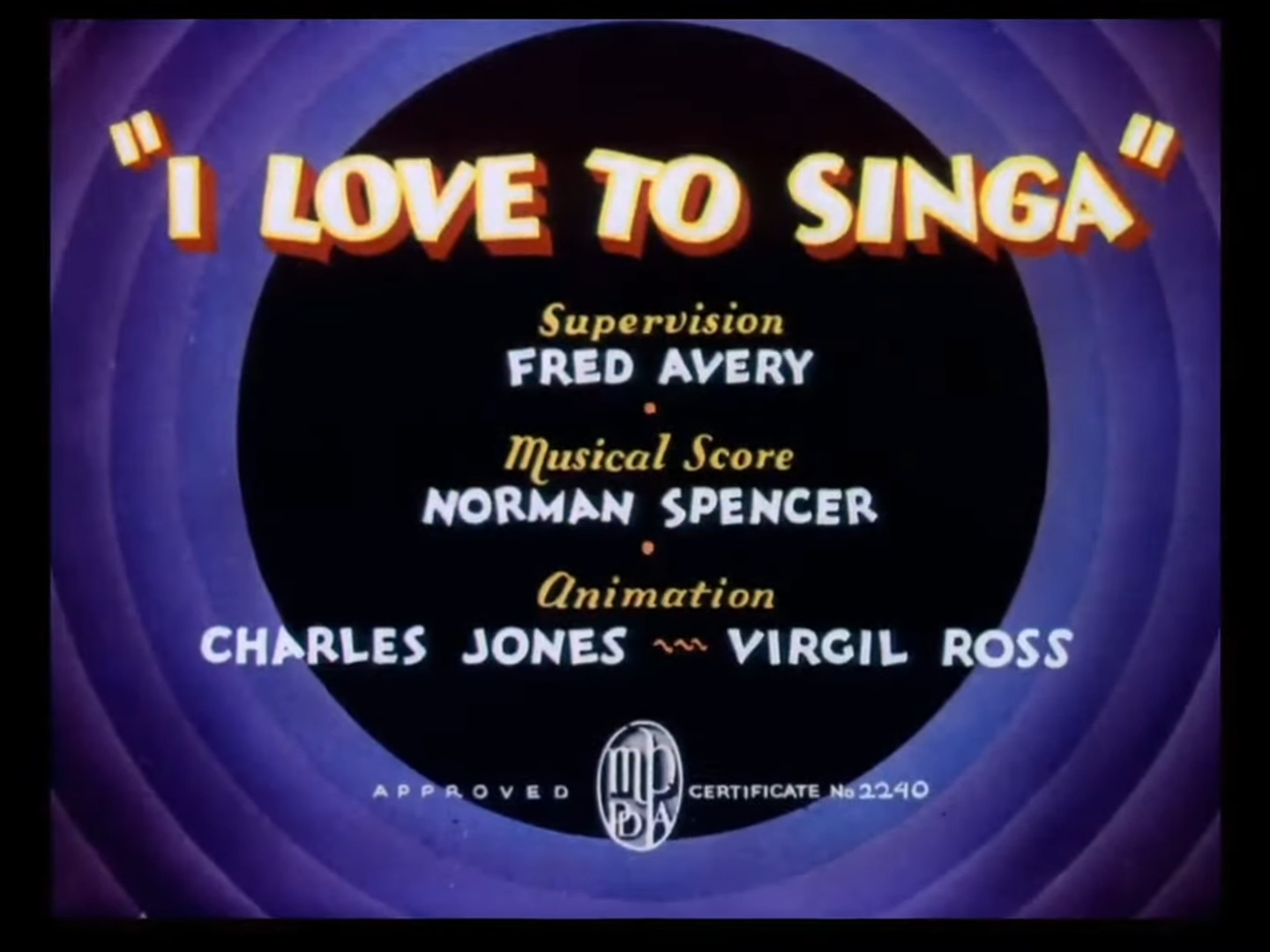
- Original title card
- Directed by: Fred Avery
- Produced by: Leon Schlesinger
- Music by: Norman Spencer
- Animation by: Charles Jones; Virgil Ross
- Color process: Technicolor
- Production company: Leon Schlesinger Productions
- Distributed by: Warner Bros. Productions; The Vitaphone Corporation
- Release date: July 18, 1936
- Running time: 8 mins
- Country: United States
- Language: English

I Love to Singa is a 1936 American animated comedy short film directed by Fred Avery. The short was released on July 18, 1936. It is the 61st film in the Merrie Melodies series. It was re-released as a "Blue Ribbon" reissue in 1944. The film's plot is a tribute to the 1927 film The Jazz Singer, the first sound film to be released widely.

== Plot ==
A classical music teacher, Professor Fritz Owl and his wife witness the hatching of their four children, including an opera singer, a violinist, a flute player, and to his horror, a jazz singer which goes against his ideals of classical music. The child is forced to sing "Drink to Me Only with Thine Eyes" while his mother plays the organ, occasionally sneaking in snippets of the titular song, which leads to him being thrown out of the house by an angry Professor Fritz Owl.

The owlet gleefully sings as he wanders away, while his parents regret having thrown him out of the house. He notices an amateur singing contest held at a radio station, hosted by Jack Bunny, a caricature of Jack Benny, who is dissatisfied by the sheer lack of talent in enthusiastic amateurs and sends them down a hatch. While the secretary reads a telegram, reading out all the stop signs much to the chagrin of a co-worker, the owlet calls himself "Owl Jolson" (a reference to Al Jolson) and manages to impress Jack. Fritz and his family hear him on the radio, realizing their mistakes, and run to the radio station. The owlet spots his family and switches to "Drink to Me Only with Thine Eyes", risking disqualification, but his family bursts in to reassure him. They dance to his singing and later join in, while Jack presents the first prize to the owlet, which he grabs during the iris out.

== Music ==
As with several early Warner cartoons, this cartoon is in a sense a music video designed to popularize the song and increase sales of sheet music and recordings; a major source of income for Warner Bros. The song "I Love to Singa" was first written by Harold Arlen and E.Y. Harburg for the 1936 Warner Bros. feature-length film The Singing Kid. It is performed three times in the film: first by Al Jolson and Cab Calloway, then by the Yacht Club Boys and Jolson, and finally again by Calloway and Jolson. During this period, it was customary for Warners to have their animation production partner, Leon Schlesinger Productions, make Merrie Melodies cartoons based upon songs from their features.

== Reception ==
The cartoon has become a cult classic, with a pervasive impact on popular culture. The short, one of the earliest Merrie Melodies produced in Technicolor's then-new three-color process (Process 4), is recognized as one of director Tex Avery's early masterpieces. Musicologist Daniel Goldmark writes, "I Love to Singa may be one of the most instantly endearing cartoons Warner Bros. ever created. The story combines two themes that are as popular then as they are now—a child breaking away from his parents and contesting chasing the 'rags-to-riches' promise of amateur shows." Animation historian Jerry Beck agrees, "While not as wacky as Tex Avery's later works, I Love to Singa is still the perfect metaphor for the changes this great director brought to the studio. Instead of following stuffy cartoon convention, Tex taught his peers to march to their own drummers."

== Legacy ==
In the pilot episode of South Park, "Cartman Gets an Anal Probe", Eric Cartman dances and moves his mouth in time with a recording of Owl Jolson singing "I Love to Singa". (Note: Comedy Central was formerly jointly owned by Viacom and Time Warner Entertainment via HBO from 1991 to 2003 and is currently owned by Skydance TV from 2026 onwards.) The episode originally aired on August 13, 1997.

A scene of the short with the owlet singing is seen briefly a couple of times in the 2003 film Looney Tunes: Back in Action when Mr. Chairman tries to tune his television.

== Home media ==
- VHS – Cartoon Moviestars Porky!
- LaserDisc – Cartoon Moviestars Daffy and Porky!
- VHS – The Golden Age of Looney Tunes
- LaserDisc – The Golden Age of Looney Tunes
- DVD – Happy Feet
- DVD – Looney Tunes Golden Collection: Volume 2
- Blu-ray/DVD – Looney Tunes Platinum Collection: Volume 1
- Blu-ray/DVD – The Jazz Singer
