= Flop Goes the Weasel (film) =

1943 film by Charles M. Jones

- Original title card
- Directed by: Charles M. Jones
- Story by: Michael Maltese
- Produced by: Leon Schlesinger
- Starring: Mel Blanc; Ruby Dandridge (both uncredited)
- Music by: Carl W. Stalling
- Animation by: Rudy Larriva
- Color process: Technicolor
- Production company: Leon Schlesinger Productions
- Distributed by: Warner Bros. Pictures
- Release date: March 20, 1943
- Running time: 7 min
- Country: United States
- Language: English

Flop Goes the Weasel is a 1943 American animated comedy short film directed by Charles M. Jones. The short was originally released on March 20, 1943. It is part of the Merrie Melodies series.

It was re-released as a "Blue Ribbon" reissue in 1949, rendering the original film lost, though Michael Maltese kept the title and credits cels. Despite copyright neglect by Warner Bros. Pictures, the company realized the mistake and copyrighted the Blue Ribbon reissue, allowing the original film to lapse into the public domain while United Artists renewed the reissue's copyright.

== Plot ==
The film without credits

A mammy hen is off trying to catch a worm for her soon-to-be baby. While she is out, a weasel steals the egg, intending to eat it for breakfast. However, when the weasel cracks the egg, the chick falls out and mistakes the weasel for its mother. The weasel wants to eat the chick, but the chick outsmarts him every time. For the last three minutes of the film, the weasel is constantly sneezing because the chick has put pepper up his nose. The chick returns to its biological mother, who finds out that it has beaten up the weasel.

== Reception ==
On July 30, 1949, Boxoffice reviewed the short: "Very Good. The so-called Wiley Weasel is flabbergasted when an egg he has stolen from a barnyard hen for his meal, hatches out a small chick. The chick mistakes the weasel for its mother and the rodent is forced to play the game. He tries, without success, to lure the chick into the roasting pan."
