= Mouse Menace =

- Lobby card
- Directed by: Arthur Davis
- Story by: George Hill
- Starring: Mel Blanc
- Music by: Carl Stalling
- Animation by: Manny Gould; Don Williams; Cal Dalton; A.C. Gamer (effects animation)
- Layouts by: Thomas McKimson
- Backgrounds by: Philip DeGuard
- Color process: Technicolor
- Production company: Warner Bros. Cartoons
- Distributed by: Warner Bros. Pictures
- Release date: November 2, 1946
- Running time: 7:01
- Language: English

Mouse Menace is a 1946 Warner Bros. Looney Tunes animated short film directed by Arthur Davis. The short was released on November 2, 1946, and stars Porky Pig.

== Plot ==
A persistent mouse incursion into Porky Pig's household sets the stage for a series of misadventures. Despite Porky's initial attempts to eliminate the mouse proving fruitless, including enlisting the aid of a feline and even a mountain lion, each endeavor ends in calamity.

Undeterred, Porky escalates his efforts by constructing a robotic cat, hoping to outwit the elusive rodent. However, the mouse proves to be a cunning adversary, deploying various traps and tactics to thwart the mechanical feline's advances. Despite enduring numerous hazards, including explosions and flamethrowers, the robotic cat valiantly persists in its mission.

Ultimately, the mouse engineers its own explosive countermeasure, obliterating Porky's residence in the process. Surprisingly, Porky expresses relief at the apparent resolution of the pest problem, only to be met with the mouse's enigmatic reappearance and the cryptic remark, "Shall I tell him?"

== See also ==
- Porky Pig filmography
- Looney Tunes and Merrie Melodies filmography (1940–1949)
