= Kit for Cat =

- Original title card
- Directed by: I. Freleng
- Story by: Michael Maltese; Tedd Pierce
- Starring: Mel Blanc; Arthur Q. Bryan (uncredited); Bea Benaderet (uncredited)
- Music by: Carl Stalling
- Animation by: Gerry Chiniquy; Ken Champin; Manuel Perez; Virgil Ross
- Layouts by: Hawley Pratt
- Backgrounds by: Paul Julian
- Color process: Technicolor
- Production company: Warner Bros. Cartoons
- Distributed by: Warner Bros. Pictures
- Release date: November 6, 1948
- Running time: 7:23
- Country: United States
- Language: English

Kit for Cat is a 1948 Looney Tunes cartoon directed by Friz Freleng. The short was released on November 6, 1948 and features Elmer Fudd and Sylvester. The title is a pun on the phrase “tit for tat”; Sylvester would appear in another cartoon with a similar title, Trip for Tat.

== Plot ==
While scavenging for food in an alley, Sylvester encounters a small kitten and aggressively chases it away into a trash can. When a blizzard hits, Sylvester seeks shelter at a nearby house by feigning frostbite. The homeowner, Elmer Fudd, takes him in and offers him a permanent home. Shortly after, the kitten arrives in a similar state, and Elmer takes it in as well. Realizing he can only afford to keep one pet, Elmer decides to sleep on the decision until morning, dismissing Sylvester's attempts to act like a baby to win his affection.

Determined to eliminate his competition, Sylvester attempts to frame the kitten for household mishaps. First, he pours milk over the kitten and drops the bottle to simulate a spill. However, Elmer assumes the kitten was simply hungry and rewards it with a lavish meal. Next, Sylvester gives the kitten a ball of string tied to a stack of dishes. When the kitten pulls the string and shatters the dishes, it quickly glues them back together, only for Sylvester to smash them again. Elmer catches Sylvester in the act and warns him that his behavior is making the decision easier.

Sylvester then uses a book on hypnotism to trance the kitten into hitting a sleeping Elmer with a baseball bat. When Sylvester points to his own head to demonstrate, the kitten mistakenly strikes Sylvester instead. Dazed, Sylvester stumbles into Elmer's bed, prompting Elmer to throw him downstairs with a warning that he will be held responsible for any further disturbances. Next, Sylvester lures the kitten into a mouse hole with a wind-up toy and boards up the entrance. Inside the walls, the kitten knocks loose the nails holding up wall hangings and a chandelier. Despite Sylvester's frantic efforts to catch the falling objects, the chandelier crashes down, prompting Elmer to issue a final warning: one more sound and Sylvester will be thrown out.

Overhearing the ultimatum, the kitten intentionally tries to make noise to get Sylvester evicted. As the kitten attempts to fire Elmer's shotgun, Sylvester places earmuffs on the sleeping Elmer and plugs the gun barrel with his finger. Undeterred, the kitten beats a parade drum and slams doors, causing Sylvester to lose his temper and chase it. During the pursuit, the kitten turns on a loud radio drama, activates a player piano, fires the shotgun again, and tricks Sylvester into crashing into a metal bowl. The resulting noise wakes Elmer, who prepares to evict Sylvester. Before he can do so, his landlord arrives and serves him an eviction notice due to the excessive noise. The cartoon ends with Sylvester, the kitten, and Elmer all scavenging for food together in the alley.

== Home media ==
- VHS: Wideo Wabbit
- DVD: Looney Tunes Golden Collection: Volume 1; Looney Tunes Spotlight Collection: Volume 1

== See also ==
- Elmer Fudd filmography
- Sylvester the Cat filmography
- Looney Tunes and Merrie Melodies filmography (1940–1949)
