= A Fox in a Fix =

- Directed by: Robert McKimson
- Story by: Warren Foster
- Starring: Mel Blanc
- Music by: Carl Stalling
- Animation by: Phil DeLara; Charles McKimson; Rod Scribner; J.C. Melendez; John Carey
- Layouts by: Cornett Wood
- Backgrounds by: Richard H. Thomas
- Color process: Technicolor
- Production company: Warner Bros. Cartoons
- Distributed by: Warner Bros. Pictures
- Release date: January 20, 1951
- Running time: 7:03
- Language: English

A Fox in a Fix is a 1951 Warner Bros. Merrie Melodies cartoon directed by Robert McKimson. The short was released on January 20, 1951.

The film deals with a feigned friendship between a fox and a bulldog. The fox requests hospitality, but plans to betray his "friend" and to steal the dog's chickens. The dog is already aware of this plan. He offers hospitality, but he has set a trap for his "friend".

== Plot ==
The story opens when the fox is seen sneaking from atop a hill down to a farm. As he is walking, he narrates the story to the viewer. His first line is like: "As the last light went out, I knew my chance had come, to get at those chickens". After his first attempt and fail at stealing the chickens and being caught by the watch dog, he decides a different approach. To gain the friendship and trust of the bulldog, the fox shaves his tail and pretends to be a hard-luck terrier looking for a place to live.

Unbeknown to the fox, the bulldog instantly sees through the fox's ploy but acts as though he is fooled. He agrees to share his home with the fox. At night, the fox sneaks into the chicken coop to steal one of the hens. The dog disguises himself as a huge chicken, which the greedy fox takes, and when the bulldog reveals himself beneath the disguise, the fox bolts and runs to a highway, where he hitches a ride on a passing truck, not noticing that the truck belongs to a fox furrier company.

== Home media ==
This short is available on disc 1 of the Looney Tunes Collector's Vault: Volume 1 Blu-ray set.
