= Sid Sutherland =

American animator (1901–1968)

- Born: August 7, 1901; Los Angeles, California, U.S.
- Died: April 20, 1968 (aged 66); Los Angeles, California, U.S.
- Other name: Sidney Sutherland
- Occupations: animator, screenwriter, sound editor
- Years active: 1933-1966
- Employer(s): Universal Cartoon Studios (1935); Leon Schlesinger Productions(1935–1942)

Sidney E. Sutherland (August 7, 1901 – April 20, 1968) was an American animator, screenwriter, and sound editor who is best known as an animator at Warner Bros. Cartoons.

== Career ==
Sutherland's professional life was varied across the entertainment business, ranging from journalism, screenwriting, animation, sound recording, and sound editing. In the 1930s, Sutherland wrote magazine articles, including two for Liberty magazine entitled The Mystery of Sacco and Vanzetti. In 1932, not long after the advent of talkies, Sutherland also broke into the movie business and began a career as a screenwriter at First National Pictures on The Match King, starring Warren William and Lili Damita. Although he soon developed a second career as an animator, he continued working concurrently as a screenwriter over the next fourteen years, his last movie being Wife Wanted (1946).

Sutherland first branched into animation in 1935 with At Your Service for the Walter Lantz Studio at Universal Pictures where he worked with Tex Avery, Virgil Ross, and Cecil Surry. When Avery left Lantz later that year to direct animated shorts for Leon Schlesinger at Warner Bros., Avery offered Sutherland, Ross, and Surry the opportunity to join his new unit if they were looking to leave Universal. Lantz was not happy about the departures and told them that they would not be welcome back at his company; Avery, Ross and Surry would eventually return. At Warner Bros. the four men, along with Bob Clampett, Chuck Jones, Robert Cannon, and Elmer Wait who were already employed by Schlesinger, moved into their own shabby workspace, a separate run-down building on the lot which became known at Termite Terrace. Away from the watchful eye of Schlesinger who, with the rest of his employees, remained in the building on the north end of the lot near Sunset Boulevard, Sutherland joined Tex and his unit where they all worked day and night, filled with ambition and enthusiasm. Subsequently, Sutherland became animator on dozens of Looney Tunes and Merrie Melodies cartoons until 1942.

Starting in 1943 during a changing market caused by World War II, Sutherland decided to take advantage of opportunities to work in the relatively new medium of television and made a career change to a more secure living as a sound supervisor and sound editor. He worked steadily in the sound department on dozens of television episodes over the next 24 years, including work on The Cisco Kid, Highway Patrol, Bat Masterson, and Sea Hunt. Just prior to his retirement in 1966, Sutherland was a sound editor on the motion picture comedy, The Russians Are Coming! The Russians Are Coming!, starring Carl Reiner.
