= Elmer Fudd filmography =

Elmer Fudd has been featured in various media since his debut in 1937.

== Golden Age cartoons ==
 Legend

LT
stands for Looney Tunes
MM
stands for Merrie Melodies

=== 1937 ===
No.	Title	Original release date	Series	Directed by	Official DVD/Blu-Ray Availability	Notes
1	Little Red Walking Hood	November 6	MM	Tex Avery	DVD: Looney Tunes Golden Collection: Volume 5	Features the Elmer Fudd prototype, voiced by Mel Blanc.
=== 1938 ===
2	The Isle of Pingo Pongo	May 28	MM	Tex Avery	Currently Unavailable	Features the Elmer Fudd prototype, voiced by Mel Blanc.; First use of the name "Elmer" on the lobby cards.; Part of the "Censored Eleven". Permanently banned from television in 1969 due to racist depictions of African Americans. Has never been officially released on any home video format.
3	Cinderella Meets Fella	July 23	MM	Tex Avery	Blu-Ray: Looney Tunes Collector's Choice: Volume 3	Features the Elmer Fudd prototype, voiced by Danny Webb.
4	A Feud There Was	September 24	MM	Tex Avery	Blu-Ray: Looney Tunes Collector's Choice: Volume 3	Features the Elmer Fudd prototype, voiced by Mel Blanc and Roy Rogers.; First use of the name Elmer Fudd on screen.
5	Johnny Smith and Poker-Huntas	October 22	MM	Tex Avery	Currently Unavailable	Features the Elmer Fudd prototype, voiced by Mel Blanc.; Rarely shown due to Native American stereotyping. Last released officially on The Golden Age of Looney Tunes laserdisc set in 1992.
=== 1939 ===
6	Hamateur Night	January 28	MM	Tex Avery	Blu-Ray: Looney Tunes Collector's Choice: Volume 2	Public Domain; Features the Elmer Fudd prototype, voiced by Mel Blanc.
7	A Day at the Zoo	March 11	MM	Tex Avery	Blu-Ray: Looney Tunes Collector's Vault: Volume 1	Public Domain; Features the Elmer Fudd prototype, voiced by Mel Blanc.
8	Believe It or Else	June 3	MM	Tex Avery	Currently Unavailable	Features the Elmer Fudd prototype, voiced by Danny Webb.
=== 1940 ===
9	Elmer's Candid Camera	March 2	MM	Chuck Jones	DVD: Looney Tunes Golden Collection: Volume 1; DVD: The Essential Bugs Bunny; DVD/Blu-Ray: Looney Tunes Platinum Collection: Volume 2; Blu-Ray: Bugs Bunny 80th Anniversary Collection	with the Bugs Bunny prototype.; First official appearance of Elmer Fudd voiced by Arthur Q. Bryan.; First Elmer Fudd cartoon directed by Chuck Jones.
10	Confederate Honey	March 30	MM	Friz Freleng	Currently Unavailable	First Elmer Fudd cartoon directed by Friz Freleng.; Rarely shown due to racial African American stereotyping. Last released officially on The Golden Age of Looney Tunes laserdisc set in 1992.
11	The Hardship of Miles Standish	April 27	MM	Friz Freleng	Currently Unavailable	Rarely shown due to Native American stereotyping. Last released officially on The Golden Age of Looney Tunes laserdisc set in 1992.
12	A Wild Hare	July 27	MM	Tex Avery	DVD: Looney Tunes Golden Collection: Volume 3 (Bonus Feature- Unrestored); DVD: Looney Tunes Golden Collection: Volume 4 (Bonus Feature- Unrestored); DVD: Warner Bros. Home Entertainment Academy Awards Animation Collection (restored); DVD: The Essential Bugs Bunny (restored); DVD/Blu-Ray: Looney Tunes Platinum Collection: Volume 2 (restored); Blu-Ray: Bugs Bunny 80th Anniversary Collection (restored)	First official appearance of Bugs Bunny; Final Elmer Fudd cartoon directed by Tex Avery; Academy Award-nominee for Best Short Subject (Cartoon)
13	Good Night Elmer	October 26	MM	Chuck Jones	Blu-Ray: Looney Tunes Collector's Vault: Volume 1	
=== 1941 ===
14	Elmer's Pet Rabbit	January 4	MM	Chuck Jones	Blu-Ray: Looney Tunes Collector's Choice: Volume 3	with Bugs Bunny
15	Wabbit Twouble	December 20	MM	Bob Clampett	DVD: Looney Tunes Golden Collection: Volume 1; DVD/Blu-Ray: Looney Tunes Platinum Collection: Volume 2	with Bugs Bunny; First "Fat Elmer" cartoon; First Elmer Fudd cartoon directed by Bob Clampett.
=== 1942 ===
16	The Wabbit Who Came to Supper	March 28	MM	Friz Freleng	DVD: Looney Tunes Golden Collection: Volume 3	Public Domain; with Bugs Bunny, and cameo appearance by Willoughby; Second "Fat Elmer" cartoon
17	The Wacky Wabbit	May 2	MM	Bob Clampett	DVD: Looney Tunes Golden Collection: Volume 5	Public Domain; with Bugs Bunny; Third "Fat Elmer" cartoon
18	Fresh Hare	August 22	MM	Friz Freleng	DVD: Captains of the Clouds (Bonus Feature - unrestored and uncensored)	Public Domain; with Bugs Bunny; Fourth and final "Fat Elmer" cartoon.; Clips of a restored print of this cartoon can be seen in the documentary bonus features of Looney Tunes Platinum Collection: Volume 2 and Bugs Bunny 80th Anniversary Collection. However, the restored version of the full cartoon has never been officially released on any home video format, most likely due to a blackface joke at the end of the cartoon.
19	The Hare-Brained Hypnotist	October 31	MM	Friz Freleng	DVD: Looney Tunes Golden Collection: Volume 2	with Bugs Bunny
=== 1943 ===
20	To Duck.... or Not to Duck	March 6	LT	Chuck Jones	DVD: Looney Tunes Golden Collection: Volume 6	Public Domain; First pairing of Elmer Fudd and Daffy Duck
21	A Corny Concerto	September 18	MM	Bob Clampett	DVD: Looney Tunes Golden Collection: Volume 2; DVD/Blu-Ray: Looney Tunes Platinum Collection: Volume 3	Public Domain; with Bugs Bunny, Daffy Duck, and Porky Pig
22	An Itch in Time	December 4	MM	Bob Clampett	DVD: Looney Tunes Golden Collection: Volume 3; DVD/Blu-Ray: Looney Tunes Platinum Collection: Volume 2	with A. Flea and Willoughby
=== 1944 ===
23	The Old Grey Hare	October 28	MM	Bob Clampett	DVD: Looney Tunes Golden Collection: Volume 5; DVD: The Essential Bugs Bunny; DVD/Blu-Ray: Looney Tunes Platinum Collection: Volume 1; Blu-Ray: Bugs Bunny 80th Anniversary Collection	with Bugs Bunny
24	The Stupid Cupid	November 25	LT	Frank Tashlin	DVD: Looney Tunes Golden Collection: Volume 4; DVD/Blu-Ray: Looney Tunes Platinum Collection: Volume 3	with Daffy Duck; First Elmer Fudd cartoon directed by Frank Tashlin.
25	Stage Door Cartoon	December 30	MM	Friz Freleng	DVD: Looney Tunes Golden Collection: Volume 2; Blu-Ray: Looney Tunes Collector's Vault: Volume 3	with Bugs Bunny
=== 1945 ===
26	The Unruly Hare	February 10	MM	Frank Tashlin	Blu-Ray: Looney Tunes Collector's Choice: Volume 1	with Bugs Bunny
27	Hare Tonic	November 10	LT	Chuck Jones	DVD: Looney Tunes Golden Collection: Volume 3; DVD/Blu-Ray: Looney Tunes Platinum Collection: Volume 1	with Bugs Bunny
=== 1946 ===
28	Hare Remover	March 23	MM	Frank Tashlin (uncredited)	DVD: Looney Tunes Golden Collection: Volume 3; Blu-Ray: Looney Tunes Collector's Vault: Volume 2	with Bugs Bunny; Final Elmer Fudd cartoon directed by Frank Tashlin.
29	The Big Snooze	October 5	LT	Bob Clampett (uncredited)	DVD: Looney Tunes Golden Collection: Volume 2; DVD/Blu-Ray: Looney Tunes Platinum Collection: Volume 3	with Bugs Bunny; Final Elmer Fudd cartoon directed by Bob Clampett.
=== 1947 ===
30	Easter Yeggs	June 28	LT	Robert McKimson	DVD: Looney Tunes Golden Collection: Volume 3; DVD/Blu-Ray: Looney Tunes Platinum Collection: Volume 3	with Bugs Bunny; First Elmer Fudd cartoon directed by Robert McKimson.
31	A Pest in the House	August 2	MM	Chuck Jones	DVD: Looney Tunes Golden Collection: Volume 5; DVD/Blu-Ray: Looney Tunes Platinum Collection: Volume 1	with Daffy Duck
32	Slick Hare	November 1	MM	Friz Freleng	DVD: Looney Tunes Golden Collection: Volume 2; DVD/Blu-Ray: Looney Tunes Platinum Collection: Volume 3	with Bugs Bunny
=== 1948 ===
33	What Makes Daffy Duck	February 14	LT	Arthur Davis	DVD/Blu-Ray: Looney Tunes Platinum Collection: Volume 2	with Daffy Duck; First and only Elmer Fudd cartoon directed by Arthur Davis.
34	Back Alley Oproar	March 27	MM	Friz Freleng	DVD: Looney Tunes Golden Collection: Volume 2; DVD/Blu-Ray: Looney Tunes Platinum Collection: Volume 2	First pairing of Elmer Fudd and Sylvester; Color remake of Notes to You
35	Kit for Cat	November 6	LT	Friz Freleng	DVD: Looney Tunes Golden Collection: Volume 1	with Sylvester
=== 1949 ===
36	Wise Quackers	January 1	LT	Friz Freleng	DVD: Looney Tunes Super Stars' Daffy Duck: Frustrated Fowl; Blu-Ray: Looney Tunes Collector's Vault: Volume 2	with Daffy Duck
37	Hare Do	January 15	MM	Friz Freleng	DVD: Looney Tunes Golden Collection: Volume 3	with Bugs Bunny
38	Each Dawn I Crow	September 24	MM	Friz Freleng	Blu-Ray: Looney Tunes Collector's Vault: Volume 1	
=== 1950 ===
39	The Scarlet Pumpernickel	March 4	LT	Chuck Jones	DVD: Looney Tunes Golden Collection: Volume 1; DVD: The Essential Daffy Duck; DVD/Blu-Ray: Looney Tunes Platinum Collection: Volume 1	with Daffy Duck, Melissa Duck, Porky Pig, and Sylvester, and cameo appearances by Henery Hawk, and Mama Bear
40	What's Up Doc?	June 17	LT	Robert McKimson	DVD: Looney Tunes Golden Collection: Volume 1; Blu-Ray: Bugs Bunny 80th Anniversary Collection	with Bugs Bunny
41	Rabbit of Seville	December 16	LT	Chuck Jones	DVD: Looney Tunes Golden Collection: Volume 1; DVD: The Essential Bugs Bunny; DVD/Blu-Ray: Looney Tunes Platinum Collection: Volume 1; Blu-Ray: Bugs Bunny 80th Anniversary Collection	with Bugs Bunny
=== 1951 ===
42	Rabbit Fire	May 19	LT	Chuck Jones	DVD: Looney Tunes Golden Collection: Volume 1; DVD: The Essential Bugs Bunny; DVD/Blu-Ray: Looney Tunes Platinum Collection: Volume 2; Blu-Ray: Bugs Bunny 80th Anniversary Collection	with Bugs Bunny and Daffy Duck; First cartoon in the "Hunting Trilogy"
=== 1952 ===
43	Rabbit Seasoning	September 20	MM	Chuck Jones	DVD: Looney Tunes Golden Collection: Volume 1; DVD/Blu-Ray Looney Tunes Platinum Collection: Volume 2	with Bugs Bunny and Daffy Duck; Second cartoon in the "Hunting Trilogy"
=== 1953 ===
44	Upswept Hare	March 14	MM	Robert McKimson	Blu-Ray: Bugs Bunny 80th Anniversary Collection	with Bugs Bunny
45	Ant Pasted	May 9	LT	Friz Freleng	DVD: Looney Tunes Super Stars' Porky & Friends: Hilarious Ham	
46	Duck! Rabbit, Duck!	October 3	MM	Chuck Jones	DVD: Looney Tunes Golden Collection: Volume 3; DVD/Blu-Ray: Looney Tunes Platinum Collection: Volume 2	with Bugs Bunny and Daffy Duck; Third and final cartoon in the "Hunting Trilogy".
47	Robot Rabbit	December 12	LT	Friz Freleng	Blu-Ray: Bugs Bunny 80th Anniversary Collection	with Bugs Bunny
=== 1954 ===
48	Design for Leaving	March 27	LT	Robert McKimson	DVD: Looney Tunes Super Stars' Daffy Duck: Frustrated Fowl (cropped to widescreen)	with Daffy Duck
49	Quack Shot	October 30	MM	Robert McKimson	Blu-Ray: Looney Tunes Collector's Choice: Volume 4	with Daffy Duck
=== 1955 ===
50	Pests for Guests	January 29	MM	Friz Freleng	Blu-Ray: Looney Tunes Collector's Vault: Volume 2	Only pairing of Elmer Fudd and the Goofy Gophers.
51	Beanstalk Bunny	February 12	MM	Chuck Jones	Blu-Ray: Looney Tunes Collector's Choice: Volume 1	with Bugs Bunny and Daffy Duck
52	Hare Brush	May 7	MM	Friz Freleng	Blu-Ray: Bugs Bunny 80th Anniversary Collection	with Bugs Bunny
53	Rabbit Rampage	June 11	LT	Chuck Jones	DVD: Looney Tunes Golden Collection: Volume 6 (Bonus Feature; unrestored); Blu-Ray: Looney Tunes Collector's Choice: Volume 2 (restored)	Cameo appearance; with Bugs Bunny
54	This Is a Life?	July 9	MM	Friz Freleng	DVD: Looney Tunes Super Stars' Daffy Duck: Frustrated Fowl (cropped to widescreen); Blu-Ray: Bugs Bunny 80th Anniversary Collection (correct aspect ratio)	with Bugs Bunny, Daffy Duck, Granny, and Yosemite Sam; First pairing of Elmer Fudd and Yosemite Sam; only pairing of Elmer Fudd and Granny.; First time June Foray provides the voice of Granny.; Utilizes footage from A Hare Grows in Manhattan, Hare Do and Buccaneer Bunny.
55	Heir-Conditioned	November 26	LT	Friz Freleng	DVD: Looney Tunes Golden Collection: Volume 6	with Sylvester
=== 1956 ===
56	Bugs' Bonnets	January 14	MM	Chuck Jones	DVD: Looney Tunes Golden Collection: Volume 5	with Bugs Bunny
57	A Star Is Bored	September 15	LT	Friz Freleng	DVD: Looney Tunes Golden Collection: Volume 5; DVD: The Essential Daffy Duck; Blu-Ray: Looney Tunes Collector's Vault: Volume 3	with Bugs Bunny, Daffy Duck, and Yosemite Sam; Final pairing of Elmer Fudd and Yosemite Sam
58	Yankee Dood It	October 13	MM	Friz Freleng	DVD: Looney Tunes Golden Collection: Volume 6	Final pairing of Elmer Fudd and Sylvester
59	Wideo Wabbit	October 27	MM	Robert McKimson	DVD: Looney Tunes Golden Collection: Volume 3	with Bugs Bunny
=== 1957 ===
60	What's Opera, Doc?	July 6	MM	Chuck Jones	DVD: Looney Tunes Golden Collection: Volume 2; DVD: The Essential Bugs Bunny; DVD/Blu-Ray: Looney Tunes Platinum Collection: Volume 1; Blu-Ray: Bugs Bunny 80th Anniversary Collection	with Bugs Bunny; Final Elmer Fudd cartoon directed by Chuck Jones.; Inducted into the National Film Registry
61	Rabbit Romeo	December 14	MM	Robert McKimson	DVD: Looney Tunes Golden Collection: Volume 4	with Bugs Bunny
=== 1958 ===
62	Don't Axe Me	January 4	MM	Robert McKimson	Blu-Ray: Looney Tunes Collector's Vault: Volume 3	with Daffy Duck and the Barnyard Dawg
63	Pre-Hysterical Hare	November 1	LT	Robert McKimson	Blu-Ray: Looney Tunes Collector's Choice: Volume 3	with Bugs Bunny; Only cartoon where Elmer Fudd is voiced by Dave Barry.
=== 1959 ===
64	A Mutt in a Rut	May 23	LT	Robert McKimson	DVD: Looney Tunes Super Stars' Foghorn Leghorn & Friends: Barnyard Bigmouth	
=== 1960 ===
65	Person to Bunny	April 1	MM	Friz Freleng	DVD: Looney Tunes Super Stars' Daffy Duck: Frustrated Fowl (cropped to widescreen); Blu-Ray: Bugs Bunny 80th Anniversary Collection (correct aspect ratio)	Final pairing of Elmer Fudd with Bugs Bunny and Daffy Duck; Final cartoon where Elmer Fudd is voiced by Arthur Q. Bryan.
66	Dog Gone People	November 12	MM	Robert McKimson	DVD: Looney Tunes Super Stars' Porky & Friends: Hilarious Ham	First cartoon where Elmer Fudd is voiced by Hal Smith.
=== 1961 ===
67	What's My Lion?	October 21	LT	Robert McKimson	Currently Unavailable	Final cartoon where Elmer Fudd is voiced by Hal Smith.; Final Elmer Fudd cartoon directed by Robert McKimson.
=== 1962 ===
68	Crows' Feat	April 21	MM	Friz Freleng and Hawley Pratt (co-director)	DVD: Looney Tunes Super Stars' Foghorn Leghorn & Friends: Barnyard Bigmouth	with Jose and Manuel; Silent appearance.; Final Elmer Fudd cartoon directed by Friz Freleng.; Final theatrical Elmer Fudd cartoon until 1991.

== Post-Golden Age media ==
=== Revival shorts ===
==== 1980 ====
- Bugs Bunny's Bustin' Out All Over: "Portrait of the Artist as a Young Bunny" (segment of TV special); voiced by Mel Blanc

==== 1991 ====
- Box-Office Bunny; first time voiced by Jeff Bergman. First theatrical "Elmer Fudd" cartoon since 1962. First pairing of Bugs and Daffy since 1964.
- (Blooper) Bunny; voiced by Jeff Bergman. With Bugs Bunny, Daffy Duck, and Yosemite Sam.

==== 1992 ====
- Invasion of the Bunny Snatchers; voiced by Jeff Bergman. With Bugs Bunny, Daffy Duck, Yosemite Sam, and Porky Pig

==== 2012 ====
- Daffy's Rhapsody; voiced by Billy West and James Arnold Taylor. With Daffy Duck

==== 2026 ====
- Daffy Season; voiced by Jeff Bergman. With Bugs Bunny, Daffy Duck, Lola Bunny, Porky Pig, Speedy Gonzales, and Yosemite Sam.

== Others ==
=== Cameos ===
- Bugs Bunny (1942), a 90-second animated propaganda film for World War II bonds featuring the song Any Bonds Today?; co-starring Porky Pig and Bugs Bunny
- A Corny Concerto (1943); voiced by Arthur Q. Bryan
- The Scarlet Pumpernickel (1950); voiced by Mel Blanc
- His Hare-Raising Tale (1951); voiced by Arthur Q. Bryan via archive footage from Stage Door Cartoon
- Rabbit Rampage (1955); voiced by Arthur Q. Bryan
- Bugs Bunny's Looney Christmas Tales: "Bugs Bunny's Christmas Carol" (segment of TV special) (1979); voiced by Mel Blanc
- Tiny Toon Adventures (TV series) - various episodes (1990-1992); voiced by Jeff Bergman, Greg Burson and Joe Alaskey
- Animaniacs (TV series) - (1995); voiced by Frank Welker
- Carrotblanca (1995)
- Histeria! (TV series) - "The Teddy Roosevelt Show" episode (1990s); Although unidentified, the voice actor is most likely Billy West.
- Duck Dodgers (TV series) - The Fudd (2004); voiced by Billy West

=== Documentaries ===
- Bugs Bunny: Superstar (1975)

=== Compilation films ===
- The Bugs Bunny/Road Runner Movie (1979)
- The Looney Looney Looney Bugs Bunny Movie (1981)
- Bugs Bunny's 3rd Movie: 1001 Rabbit Tales (1982)
- Daffy Duck's Fantastic Island (1983)

=== TV series ===
- The Bugs Bunny Show
- The Looney Tunes Show
- New Looney Tunes
- Looney Tunes Cartoons

=== TV specials ===
- Daffy Duck and Porky Pig Meet the Groovie Goolies (1972)
- A Connecticut Rabbit in King Arthur’s Court (1978)
- Bugs Bunny's Valentine (1979)
- Bugs Bunny's Looney Christmas Tales (1979)
- The Bugs Bunny Mystery Special (1980)
- Bugs Bunny's Mad World of Television (1982)
- Bugs vs. Daffy: Battle of the Music Video Stars (1988)
- Happy Birthday, Bugs!: 50 Looney Years (1990)
- Bugs Bunny's Overtures to Disaster (1991)
- Bugs Bunny's Creature Features (1992)
- The 1st 13th Annual Fancy Anvil Awards Show Program Special: Live in Stereo (2002)

=== Live-action / animated film ===
- Space Jam (1996)
- Looney Tunes: Back in Action (2003)
- Space Jam: A New Legacy (2021)
- Coyote vs. Acme (2026)

=== Direct-to-video ===
- Tiny Toon Adventures: How I Spent My Vacation (1992)
- Quest for Camelot Sing-A-Longs (1998)
- Looney Tunes Sing-A-Longs (1998)
- Looney Tunes: Reality Check (2003)
- Looney Tunes: Stranger Than Fiction (2003)
- Bah, Humduck! A Looney Tunes Christmas (2006)
- Looney Tunes: Rabbits Run (2015)

=== Webtoons ===
- The Matwix (2001)
