= Salt and pepper (disambiguation) =

Salt and pepper are a commonly paired set of condiments for European style cuisine.

Salt and pepper may also refer to:

== Entertainment ==
- Salt and Pepper (album), 1963 album by Paul Gonsalves & Sonny Stitt
- Salt and Pepper (film), 1968 film
- Salt N' Pepper, 2011 Malayalam film

== Food ==
- Salt and pepper shakers, the containers for the two condiments
- Salt and pepper catfish
- Sichuan pepper salt, i.e. Hua jiao yan (花椒盐), a mixture of Sichuan peppercorns and salt, roasted and ground together to make a condiment used with poultry or pork dishes.

== Science and technology ==
- Salt-and-pepper chromatin, in pathology refers to cell nuclei that demonstrate granular chromatin (on light microscopy).
- Salt-and-pepper noise, a form of noise typically seen on images
- Salt (cryptography) and pepper (cryptography), additional input to a hashing function that acts as a random value and secret respectively.

== Other ==
- Salt and pepper (superstition), or "bread and butter", a superstitious charm uttered when two walking people are separated
- "Salt and pepper", a name for partial greying of hair

== See also ==
- Salt-N-Pepa, an American hip-hop group
- Salt (disambiguation)
- Pepper (disambiguation)
