= The Hardship of Miles Standish =

1940 film by Isadore Freleng

- Title card
- Directed by: I. Freleng
- Story by: Jack Miller
- Produced by: Leon Schlesinger
- Music by: Carl W. Stalling
- Animation by: Gil Turner
- Color process: Technicolor
- Production company: Leon Schlesinger Productions
- Distributed by: Warner Bros. Pictures
- Release date: April 27, 1940
- Running time: 8 min
- Country: United States
- Language: English

The Hardship of Miles Standish is a 1940 American animated comedy short film directed by Isadore Freleng. The short was released on April 27, 1940. It is part of the Merrie Melodies series and the eleventh cartoon to feature Elmer Fudd.

The title is derived from the narrative poem The Courtship of Miles Standish.

== Plot ==
An old man is dissatisfied with how The Courtship of Miles Standish is told on the radio, and decides to tell his grandson "what really happened" back then.

In Plymouth in 1621, Miles Standish and Priscilla Mullins, respectively caricatures of Hugh Herbert and Edna May Oliver, are clearly in love but do not have the courage to meet each other despite living nearby. Miles writes a love letter, but decides to send a singing telegram instead. Messenger John Alden, portrayed by Elmer Fudd, helps deliver the telegram, which contains "You Must Have Been a Beautiful Baby". He sings the song to Priscilla alongside every single word in the telegram for no apparent reason, impressing Priscilla.

Native Americans suddenly attack Priscilla's house. After Priscilla takes her laundry to prevent them from being shot, John finds a gun and uses it to shoot the Native Americans. As the Native Americans fool around, they leave to prevent John's wrath after shattering a glass window. Priscilla is in love with John instead much to his disappointment.

The old man's grandson questions the story's accuracy, which he responds by swearing he will be struck by lightning if he lies. As he is actually struck by lightning, he claims the story to be merely how he heard it from others.

== See also ==
- Elmer Fudd filmography
- Looney Tunes and Merrie Melodies filmography (1940–1949)

Preceded by Confederate Honey	Elmer Fudd Cartoons; 1940	Succeeded by A Wild Hare
