= Short beer =

A short beer was a serving size of beer once common in New York City, being a reduced portion of beer for a reduced price. Writer David McAninch reflected on the past tradition for The New York Times:

This wonderful drink, which can still be had for 50 cents at places like Kelly's Tavern in Bay Ridge, Brooklyn, is a dignified holdover from an age before the mighty pint became the irreducible unit of consumption. The short beer is a mere half-mug, served more often than not in a small stemmed glass, and it remains the order of choice for scores of seasoned old drinkers who like to know they can still buy a round for the house once in a while. Behind the portal of many an unfashionable old bar awaits the not inconsequential delight of being able to enjoy a night of drinking in New York without using up a $10 bill.

Short beer, in Britain (also known as small beer), was used to describe a beer brewed for a short period of time to kill off bugs in it so making it safe to drink, as the water was often unhealthy.

== In popular culture ==
In the film A Day at the Races (1937) starring the Marx Bros., Dr. Hugo Z. Hackenbush (Groucho Marx) asks his dinner companion Flo, (Esther Muir) if she would care for a short beer.

The 1939 Merrie Melodies feature A Day at the Zoo features a parrot who in response to being offered a cracker says "nah, gimme a short beer."

The popular radio program Fibber McGee and Molly featured a character, Horatio K. Boomer (voiced by Bill Thomson), who would often have in his pocket a bill (unpaid, because he was a cheapskate and a con man) for a short beer.

In the film Rocky Balboa, the title character orders a short beer.

In season 5, episode 9 of The Odd Couple television series entitled The Paul Williams Story, the title character offers to buy Jack Klugman's 'Oscar Madison' "a short beer".
