= Dog Gone People =

- Directed by: Robert McKimson
- Story by: Tedd Pierce
- Produced by: William Orcutt; David H. DePatie
- Starring: Mel Blanc (all other voices); Noel Blanc (all other voices); Hal Smith (Elmer Fudd)
- Edited by: Treg Brown
- Music by: Milt Franklyn
- Animation by: Warren Batchelder; Tom Ray; Ted Bonnicksen; George Grandpré
- Layouts by: Robert Gribbroek
- Backgrounds by: William Butler
- Color process: Technicolor
- Production company: Warner Bros. Cartoons
- Distributed by: Warner Bros. Pictures
- Release date: November 12, 1960
- Running time: 7 minutes
- Language: English

Dog Gone People is a 1960 Warner Bros. Merrie Melodies cartoon animated short directed by Robert McKimson. The short was released on November 12, 1960 and features Elmer Fudd.

Elmer is voiced by Hal Smith, as Arthur Q. Bryan had died the previous year.

The main plot revolves around Elmer doing a favor to his boss by watching his dog, Rupert, during the boss's out-of-town trip . . . the catch being that Rupert behaves as though he is a human and expects to be treated accordingly, and that Elmer must do everything he can to not offend his guest or risk losing out on more than just a work promotion.

== Summary ==
Elmer Fudd is tasked with caring for his boss's dog, Rupert, under the promise of a potential promotion. Despite his best efforts to please Rupert, Elmer's attempts result in comedic mishaps. From misunderstanding Rupert's preferences to inadvertently causing chaos, Elmer finds himself in a series of humorous predicaments. Matters escalate when Rupert's misadventures lead to a drunken escapade and a run-in with the law, resulting in both Elmer and Rupert facing legal consequences. Despite the chaos, Elmer anticipates a promotion, only to discover that Rupert is the one rewarded with the coveted position, leaving Elmer still employed but disillusioned.

Preceded by Person To Bunny	Elmer Fudd cartoons 1960	Succeeded by What's My Lion?
