= To Duck.... or Not to Duck =

1943 film by Charles M. Jones

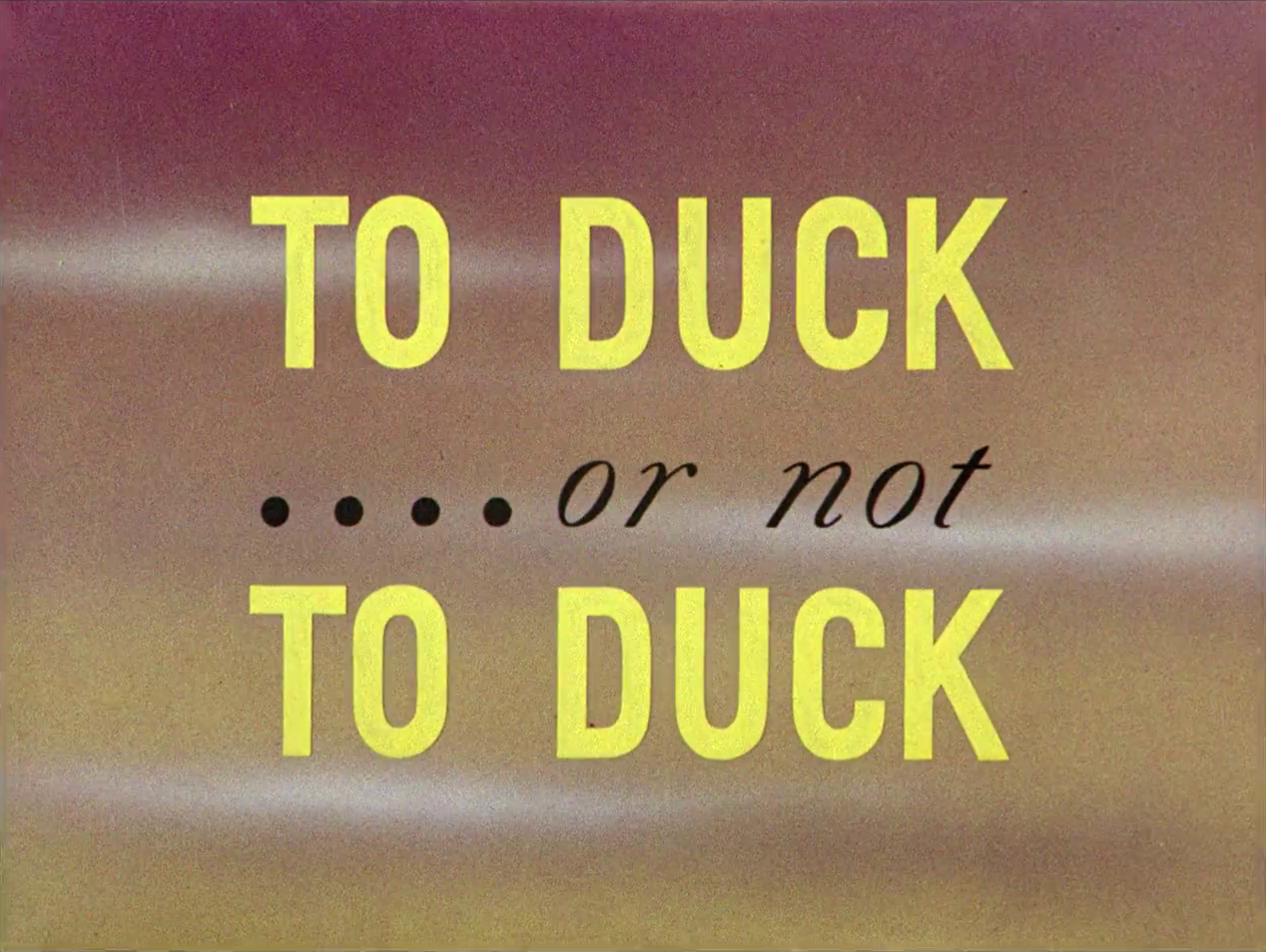
- Title card
- Directed by: Charles M. Jones
- Story by: Tedd Pierce
- Produced by: Leon Schlesinger
- Starring: Mel Blanc; Arthur Q. Bryan
- Music by: Carl W. Stalling
- Animation by: Robert Cannon
- Color process: Technicolor
- Production company: Leon Schlesinger Productions
- Distributed by: Warner Bros. Pictures
- Release date: March 6, 1943
- Running time: 6 min
- Country: United States
- Language: English

To Duck.... or Not to Duck is a 1943 American animated comedy short film directed by Charles M. Jones. The cartoon was released on March 6, 1943. It is part of the Looney Tunes series, the nineteenth cartoon to star Daffy Duck and the nineteenth cartoon to star Elmer Fudd.

In 1971, the cartoon entered the public domain in the United States because United Artists, the owner of the Associated Artists Productions library, did not renew its copyright registration in the 28th year after publication.

== Plot ==
Elmer Fudd is hunting ducks with his dog Laramore. After missing Daffy several times ("Confidentially, those hunters couldn't hit the broad side of a DUCK!" snickers Daffy to the audience) and leaving a duck-shaped hole in the clouds after each shotgun blast, Elmer manages to graze Daffy with a load of buckshot; this merely blows off his tail-feathers but causes him to fall. Laramore ensures there is a pillow waiting to cushion Daffy's landing. Daffy then gives the dog a lesson in how to retrieve a duck while calling him "Rover", but later opens the dog's mouth to climb into and play dead. When Laramore takes the duck to Elmer, Elmer apologizes for shooting him, explaining that he had to "pwug" Daffy because he is "a gweat spowtsman". An indignant Daffy sits up and heatedly retorts that Elmer doesn't know the meaning of fair play ("What chance has a poor helpless fluffy little winged creature like me against you?!") and adds that Elmer wouldn't be so tough without various accoutrements, including his big shotgun, knife and even his hunter's apparel - which Daffy actually removes from Elmer. He finishes his tirade asking what protection he has got ("A bullet-proof vest, I suppose!") and inadvertently opens his feathered chest to reveal one ("How did that get there?"). Subsequently, he challenges Elmer to a "fair" fight.

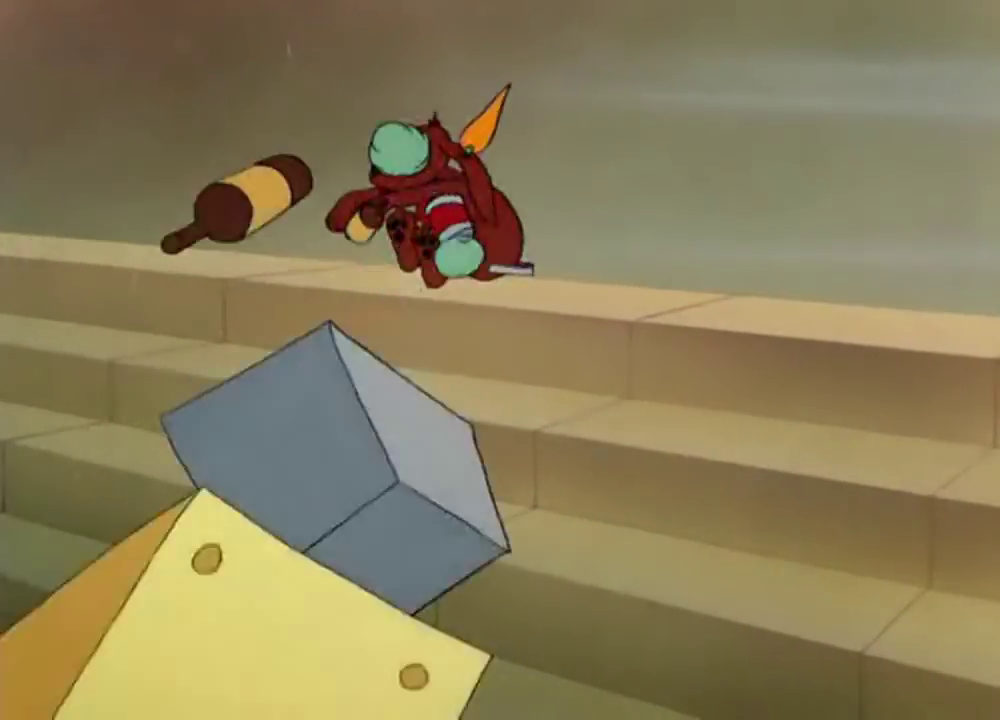
Elmer's hunting dog, Laramore, is knocked out of his own separate stand by the all-duck audience during the boxing match.

Intimidatingly, Daffy maneuvers Elmer into a boxing ring which is surrounded by many duck spectators. The burly referee of the fight is also a duck, named Ducky Wheeze. He struggles to stop laughing at pathetic Elmer long enough to introduce him; when he finally does, Elmer stands up and meekly says, "Hewwo". The crowd boos overwhelmingly; only Laramore, from separate and otherwise empty bleachers, cheers; he is immediately knocked over by various objects thrown at him from the crowd.

The referee gives Daffy "Good to His Mother" Duck a resounding, loving introduction. The duck spectators cheer wildly; Laramore, back in his spot in the separate and otherwise empty bleachers, boos; he is again knocked over by thrown objects.

Before the match starts, the referee exhorts the two opponents to "fight clean", turning to wink at the duck spectators who, knowing what is coming, collectively shout, "Oh, brother!" The referee then calls "no rough stuff -- none of THIS! Or THIS! Or like SO!", each time demonstrating an illegal move on Elmer and knocking him silly. Daffy, in turn, picks up where the referee left off, asking, "You mean none of THIS? Or THIS?", manhandling (or duckhandling) Elmer similarly, and leaving him beaten up. At this point, Laramore suggests that there is "something awfully screwy about this fight, or my name isn't Laramore. And, it isn't."

As Elmer is slouched in his corner, Daffy beats up on him once more before the referee calls them out to shake hands. Daffy manipulates Elmer into "choosing" which of Daffy's hands to shake, and the result is Elmer being bashed on the head with a hammer. He falls to the mat as the referee rings the bell for Round 1, then rushes over to provide a ridiculously fast ten-count. He then declares Daffy Duck the winner and new champion.

Elmer, perplexed, walks over and says, "I'm not the one to compwain, Mr. Wefewee, but I thought you said no wough stuff! None of THIS! Or THIS! Or wike SO!" as he demonstrates the same illegal moves which were exhibited on him earlier on both Daffy and the referee.

== Voice Cast ==
- Mel Blanc as Daffy Duck / Larrimore / Duck Referee / Duck Audience
- Arthur Q. Bryan as Elmer Fudd

== Home media ==
- VHS 1990 - Cartoon Moviestars: Daffy Duck and Company - MGM/UA Home Video
- Laserdisc 1992 - The Golden Age of Looney Tunes: Volume 2 - MGM/UA Home Video
- VHS 2001 - Looney Tunes: The Collector's Edition, Vol. 12 - Porky and Daffy - Warner Home Video/Columbia House
- DVD 2008 - Looney Tunes Golden Collection: Volume 6 (restored) - Warner Home Video
- DVD 2008 - Looney Tunes Spotlight Collection: Volume 6 (restored) - Warner Home Video
- DVD 2010 - Edge of Darkness (extra, unrestored) - Warner Home Video
- Blu-Ray 2022 - Edge of Darkness (extra, restored) - Warner Archive Collection

== See also ==
- Looney Tunes and Merrie Melodies filmography (1940–1949)
- List of animated films in the public domain in the United States
- Daffy Duck filmography
- Elmer Fudd filmography

Preceded by The Hare-Brained Hypnotist	Elmer Fudd Cartoons; 1943	Succeeded by A Corny Concerto

Preceded by My Favorite Duck	Daffy Duck Cartoons; 1943	Succeeded by The Wise Quacking Duck
