= Johnny Smith and Poker-Huntas =

1938 film by Fred Avery

- Original title card
- Directed by: Fred Avery
- Story by: Richard Hogan
- Produced by: Leon Schlesinger
- Starring: Mel Blanc; Bernice Hansen; Fred Avery
- Music by: Carl W. Stalling
- Animation by: Paul Smith
- Color process: Technicolor
- Production company: Leon Schlesinger Productions
- Distributed by: Warner Bros. Pictures; The Vitaphone Corporation
- Release date: October 22, 1938
- Running time: 8 min
- Country: United States
- Language: English

Johnny Smith and Poker-Huntas is a 1938 American animated comedy short film directed by Fred Avery. The short was released on October 22, 1938. It is part of the Merrie Melodies series and the fifth cartoon to feature Elmer Fudd. It was re-released as a "Blue Ribbon" reissue in 1943, rendering the original film lost; Avery kept a nitrate fragment of the original titles, which was sold by his family in 2004 to a private collector, but still available publicly at extremely low definition.

== Plot ==
On the Mayflower, Elmer Fudd portrays Captain Johnny Smith who arrives at the United States, attracting the attention of Native Americans. Chief No Stop, No Stoop and No Squint welcomes the Pilgrims, who rush out of the boat before Johnny could stop.

Johnny and the Pilgrims hunt and find a sign that writes "beware of scalpers", only to be met with the chief, who is literally a scalper of football game tickets, which Johnny retaliates with six tickets. He is chased by the Native Americans whose true intentions are scalping. The chase scene is humorously shortened and relegated offscreen by "the management" with permission from Johnny, who proclaims to be unable to be captured due to his contract, which proves to be untrue. A Native American warrior prepares to execute him with a fire axe and finds a dotted line on his neck, which he uses as reference.

Elsewhere, Poker-Huntas, a caricature of Pocahontas, hears the commotion on the radio and drives to his rescue in a humorously modern limousine. The other Native Americans give chase in equally modern cars, but stop midway. Johnny and Poker-Huntas return to England and start a family, having a number of children that resemble them both.

== See also ==
- Elmer Fudd filmography
- Looney Tunes and Merrie Melodies filmography (1930–1939)
