= A-Lad-In Bagdad =

1938 film by Cal Howard and Cal Dalton

- Title card
- Directed by: Cal Howard; Cal Dalton
- Story by: Dave Monahan
- Produced by: Leon Schlesinger
- Music by: Carl W. Stalling
- Animation by: Volney White
- Color process: Technicolor
- Production company: Leon Schlesinger Productions
- Distributed by: Warner Bros. Pictures; The Vitaphone Corporation
- Release date: August 27, 1938
- Running time: 7 min
- Country: United States
- Language: English

A-Lad-In Bagdad is a 1938 American animated comedy short film directed by Cal Howard and Cal Dalton. The short was released on August 27, 1938. It is part of the Merrie Melodies series, the third cartoon to feature Egghead and the final to be co-directed by Howard, who left for Fleischer Studios with Tedd Pierce.

== Plot ==
Egghead travels to Baghdad and finds an ArabMan playing on a claw machine, who wins candy beans instead of a gold lamp much to his chagrin. Egghead tries and wins the lamp, which to his horror contains a genie who looks and behaves like a stereotypical African, but is reassured after he is instructed to rub the lamp when in need of anything. Egghead is granted a new outfit on request. The man from earlier is devastated and resolves to steal the lamp for himself.

Egghead finds a sign which notes that the Sultan is giving away his daughter's hand in marriage to the cleverest entertainer in a contest. Egghead summons a flying carpet and queues for his turn at the palace, with his lamp being stolen by the man while numerous failed entertainers are sent tumbling into the basement for being unable to stop the princess from crying, including two musicians who continue to sing in the basement and are shot to death.

It is Egghead's turn, and he performs a musical routine that charms the princess into falling in love with him, rendering the lamp entirely useless even if it was not replaced. However, the sultan is not impressed by the lamp and sends him out of the palace. He finds the man using the lamp to summon gold, motivating the king to force his daughter to marry him, but Egghead arrives to beat up the man and takes the princess with him on the magic carpet. They return to Egghead's home, where the genie is revealed to actually look attractive and receives the princess's affection instead.

== Reception ==
On September 1, 1938, Motion Picture Exhibitor said, "Another Schlesinger laff-hit. The boy, who talks like Joe Penner, secures the magic lamp, has it stolen from him as he competes for the Caliph's daughter, wins her anyway, recovers the lamp for her real desires — a composite Robert Taylor, Clark Gable. It's all very funny."
