= A Day at the Zoo =

1939 film by Fred Avery

- Original title card
- Directed by: Fred Avery
- Story by: Melvin Millar
- Produced by: Leon Schlesinger
- Music by: Carl W. Stalling
- Animation by: Rollin Hamilton
- Color process: Technicolor
- Production company: Leon Schlesinger Productions
- Distributed by: Warner Bros. Pictures; The Vitaphone Corporation
- Release date: March 11, 1939
- Running time: 7 min
- Country: United States
- Language: English

A Day at the Zoo is a 1939 American animated comedy short film directed by Fred Avery. The short was released on March 11, 1939. It is part of the Merrie Melodies series and the seventh cartoon to feature Elmer Fudd. This cartoon is in the public domain in the United States due to United Artists, the copyright owners to the pre-1948 cartoons at the time, failing to renew the copyright on time in 1967. It was re-released as a "Blue Ribbon" reissue in 1952, rendering the original film lost; Avery kept a nitrate fragment of the original titles, which was sold by his family in 2004 to a private collector, but still available publicly at extremely low definition.

== Plot ==
The full short, fully restored.

The narrator showcases the animals in the Kalama Zoo, including a wolf in his natural habitat (standing next to a door, a play on the phrase "wolves at the door"), a pack of camels (smoking Camels), a North American Greyhound, "two bucks..." (white-tailed deer) "...and five (s)cents" (five skunks), as well as two friendly Elks, represented as literally two members of the titular club.

The narrator showcases monkeys who toss peanuts to their spectators instead of vice versa. A baboon notices that a human onlooker looks nearly identical to himself, exploiting the opportunity to gain freedom by switching places through a zookeeper. A monkey scolds an old lady and insults her apparent illiteracy for attempting to feed him despite a sign clearly stating "Do not feed the monkeys". The narrator then showcases a groundhog (and his separately housed shadow), another skunk who is seen reading How to Win Friends and Influence People, and a giraffe that is fed its meal of corn by way of a ladder.

White rabbits are seen to "multiply" via adding machines. The narrator moves to the aviary, where he introduces an owl, a "South African talking parrot" that eschews crackers for "a short beer," an "Alcatraz jailbird" who insists he is innocent alongside a stool pigeon that insists the jailbird is guilty, an ostrich laying a large egg that, when she stumbles after tripping over a bucket, cracks and reveals a box of a dozen chicken eggs, an elephant new to the zoo without his trunk because it got lost in luggage on the way there, pink elephants left over from last year's New Year party, two panthers pacing their cage repeating the words "bread and butter" to each other, a former circus performer, J. Wellington Buttonhook, who is decapitated by a lion yet survived, and a Rocky Mountain wildcat, gone wild because he had won a sweepstakes on "Bank Night" but did not claim the prize.

A running gag involves Elmer Fudd repeatedly taunting a lion in its cage for amusement, who the narrator scolds and encourages him to stay away, but returns offscreen. In his fourth attempt, he is eaten by the lion, in spite of the narrator's assumption that he did stay away from the lion.

== Home media ==
This short is available on disc 1 of the Looney Tunes Collector's Vault: Volume 1 Blu-ray set.

== See also ==
- Looney Tunes and Merrie Melodies filmography (1930–1939)
- List of animated films in the public domain in the United States
- Elmer Fudd filmography
