= Little Red Walking Hood =

1937 film by Fred Avery

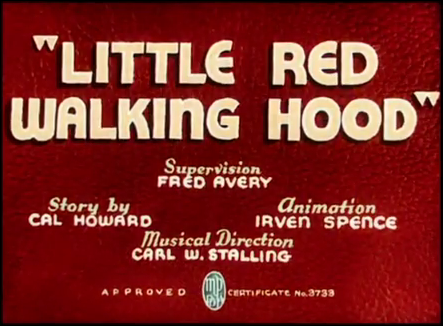
- Original title card
- Directed by: Fred Avery
- Story by: Cal Howard
- Produced by: Leon Schlesinger
- Starring: Tedd Pierce; Elvia Allman; Mel Blanc
- Music by: Carl W. Stalling
- Animation by: Irven Spence
- Color process: Technicolor
- Production company: Leon Schlesinger Productions
- Distributed by: Warner Bros. Productions; The Vitaphone Corporation
- Release date: November 6, 1937
- Running time: 7 min
- Country: United States
- Language: English

Little Red Walking Hood is a 1937 American animated comedy short film directed by Fred Avery. The short was released on November 6, 1937. It is the 85th film in the Merrie Melodies series and features the first appearance of an early character who later became Elmer Fudd. The cartoon is a parody of the fairy tale "Little Red Riding Hood" with Avery's trademark brand of humor; it serves as a spiritual predecessor to Avery's cartoons starring Red at Metro-Goldwyn-Mayer. It was re-released as a "Blue Ribbon" reissue in 1946.

== Plot ==
The Big Bad Wolf plays on a pinball machine, barely missing the jackpot through sheer misfortune. He notices Little Red Riding Hood delivering lunch to her grandmother and decides to woo her to her chagrin. She literally gives him the cold shoulder while he follows in his limousine. Elmer Fudd inexplicably emerges from a mailbox and notifies the wolf of a shortcut to Red's grandmother's house, and secretly hitchhikes on the wolf's limousine midway through.

Red's grandmother finds the wolf pretending to be Red and refuses to let him in. The wolf is angered further when Elmer enters the house with no issue, so he forcibly pushes his way in, slamming into numerous doors before Red's grandmother opens the door into the background. The wolf enters by pulling the knob and manages to score points on hollows pinball-style. He chases Red's grandmother, who stops to make a grocery order over the telephone before hiding in the closet. Elmer Fudd emerges from the closet when the wolf opens it. As the grandmother repeatedly subdues the wolf's attempts to abduct her, she gives her costume to the wolf to impersonate her when Red arrives. Red, clearly not fooled, compliments the wolf's features as if they were her grandmother's. They chase but are interrupted by Elmer Fudd, who proclaims to be the protagonist of the film, knocks out the wolf with a mallet and kisses Red.

== Voice cast ==
- Elvia Allman as Little Red Walking Hood, Granny
- Tedd Pierce as Wolf
- Mel Blanc as Elmer

== Home media ==
- LaserDisc - The Golden Age of Looney Tunes, Volume 2, Side 7
- DVD - Looney Tunes Golden Collection: Volume 5, Disc 2 (original opening, credits and closing titles restored)

== See also ==
- Elmer Fudd filmography
- Looney Tunes and Merrie Melodies filmography (1930–1939)
