= Bugs Bunny in King Arthur's Court =

1978 film by Chuck Jones

- Also known as: A Connecticut Rabbit in King Arthur's Court
- Written by: Chuck Jones (Note: In the special, Jones receives a "Plagiarized by…" credit); Mark Twain (Note: "A story stolen from…")
- Directed by: Chuck Jones
- Starring: Mel Blanc
- Music by: Dean Elliott
- Country of origin: United States

Production
- Producer: Chuck Jones
- Running time: 25 minutes
- Production companies: Chuck Jones Enterprises; Warner Bros. Television

Original release
- Network: CBS
- Release: February 23, 1978

Bugs Bunny in King Arthur's Court (originally aired on TV as A Connecticut Rabbit in King Arthur's Court) is a 1978 animated television special directed by Chuck Jones. The special is based on Mark Twain's novel A Connecticut Yankee in King Arthur's Court, and features the Looney Tunes characters Bugs Bunny, Daffy Duck, Porky Pig, Elmer Fudd and Yosemite Sam. It originally aired on CBS on February 23, 1978, with its name changed in later airings and home video releases, starting on November 22 the same year.

== Plot ==
Bugs Bunny finds himself in Camelot in the year 526 while en route to a peanut festival in Georgia. He mistakes Camelot for Pittsburgh at first, but then meets Sir Elmer of Fudde (Elmer Fudd), a brave knight. Figuring that Bugs is a transformed dragon, Elmer captures him and takes him to the castle of King Arthur. There Bugs is presented to Arthur (Daffy Duck) and court magician Merlin of Monroe (Yosemite Sam). He is sentenced to be burned at the stake, but uses a solar eclipse to pretend to affect the sun's movements, fooling the locals and attaining special status from Arthur. Arthur releases Bugs, and grants him custody of an actual dragon.

Two years later in 528, Bugs takes Porkè of Pigge, the Varlet (Porky Pig), on a tour in his Acme Armour Factory (powered by the dragon), showing him inventions to reform medieval society. Just then, Elmer appears and challenges Bugs to a jousting duel, to which the rabbit accepts. Elmer has allied with Merlin to defeat Bugs, but both find themselves doused in the moat many times during the duel, much to King Arthur's amusement. Bugs then finds Excalibur in the stone. Mistaking the sword for a "carrot slicer", he pulls it out of the stone, upon which a disembodied voice (God) proclaims him as the new king. Porkè, Elmer and Merlin pledge their allegiance to him, and Daffy passes the crown to Bugs as the new ruler.

== Credits ==
- Produced, written, and directed by Chuck Jones
- Original novel by Mark Twain
- Voice Characterizations by Mel Blanc
- Music by:
  - Dean Elliott
  - Louise DiTullio
- Edited by Sam Horta
- Camera: Animagraphics
- Production Management by:
  - Susan Charron
  - Linda Jones Clough
  - Mary Roscoe
  - Marian Dern
  - Marjorie Roach
- Art by: Don Foster
- Animation by:
  - Ken Champin
  - Marlene Robinson May
  - Celine Miles
  - Phil Monroe
  - Manny Perez
  - Mitch Rochon
  - Joe Roman
  - Virgil Ross
  - Lloyd Vaughan
  - Ben Washam
  - Jean Washam
  - Irv Wyner
  - Woody Yocum

== Reception ==
In That's All, Folks! The Art of Warner Bros. Animation, Steve Schneider called the special "one of the more highly regarded Looney Tunes specials". Jerry Beck referred to the special as "a legendary lineup of lunacy, making [it] one of the funniest 'knights' in history". Animation historians Kevin McCorry and Jon Cooke stated that the special was "Chuck Jones' newly animated and rather bland return to the days of knights and roundtables". Bert Olton considered the special "not one of the better Bugs Bunny cartoons", citing the lack of "energy, visual detail and sophistication" compared to earlier cartoons and Mel Blanc's "tired and unenthusiastic" voice acting. Michael N. Salda reviewed the special in his book Arthurian Animation: A Study of Cartoon Camelots on Film and Television, stating:

A Connecticut Rabbit in King Arthur's Court is an all-star special, casting familiar Warner Bros. properties in prominent Arthurian roles. Chuck Jones follows Twain's basic plot with departures including: capture of the Yankee; conflict with a troublesome knight and Merlin; the newcomer gaining the king's favor by 'ending' the eclipse; the Yankee's factory-building and his inventions to reform medieval society; battle and defeat of Merlin and his allies; and end of story through some means other than the violent, sad one that Twain had described. Jones packs time-honored Arthurian references into his bright and cheerful cartoon; there are a Round Table at this Camelot, pavilions flying the pennons of Lancelot and Galahad, and Merlin of Monroe's mailbox and tower from Knight-mare Hare. Jones introduces a charmed sword at the end to complete the story, as Bugs innocently pulls a 'neat carrot slicer' from a stone. A disembodied, stately voice proclaims Bugs the 'rightful king'. Daffy quickly abdicates and relinquishes the crown to Bugs, the new ruler in 'King Arth-Hare's Court'. With Daffy unseated, Bugs ruling the realm, and all Camelot's subjects pledging their allegiance to the new king, Jones slyly rebukes Filmation for its dreadful Daffy Duck and Porky Pig Meet the Groovie Goolies. Jones's long history with the Warner Bros. menagerie had taught him what fans also knew: only Bugs could ever be king.

== Availability ==
Bugs Bunny in King Arthur's Court was released on VHS as part of the Warner Bros. Cartoon Cavalcade series in 1989 and 1997, and was later released on the Looney Tunes Golden Collection: Volume 6 DVD in 2008, along with Daffy Duck's Easter Eggcitement.

== See also ==
- List of Bugs Bunny cartoons
- List of Daffy Duck cartoons
- List of Porky Pig cartoons
- List of Elmer Fudd cartoons
- List of Yosemite Sam cartoons
