= Elmer Fudd =

Warner Bros. theatrical cartoon character

Elmer J. Fudd
- Looney Tunes/Merrie Melodies character
- First appearance: Little Red Walking Hood (November 6, 1937; 89 years ago) (prototype version); The Isle of Pingo Pongo (May 28, 1938; 88 years ago) (official/finalized version)
- Created by: Tex Avery; Chuck Jones
- Voiced by: Mel Blanc (1937–1940, 1942, 1946, 1950, 1954, 1956–1957, 1959–1989); Danny Webb (1938–1939); Roy Rogers (1938, singing voice in A Feud There Was); Arthur Q. Bryan (1940–1959); Frank Graham (1944); Dave Barry (1958); Hal Smith (1960–1965); Paul Kuhn (1989); Jeff Bergman (1990–1992, 1997, 2002–2004, 2013–present); Greg Burson (1990–2001); Joe Alaskey (1992); Frank Welker (1993, 1995); Billy West (1996–2015); Tom Kenny (2004–2005); Brian Drummond (Baby Looney Tunes; 2002); Eric Bauza (2018, 2021–2026) (see below)

In-universe information
- Aliases: Elmer, Elmer Fudd (full name), Elmer J. Fudd
- Species: Human
- Gender: Male
- Occupation: Hunter
- Relatives: Louie (uncle); Judd (uncle); Electro J. Fudd (descendant)

Elmer J. Fudd (Note: Elmer Fudd is called "Elmer J. Fudd" in the 1956 short Hare Brush.) is an animated cartoon character in the Warner Bros. Looney Tunes/Merrie Melodies series. As the series' most prominent human character, he has appeared in a wide variety of films, pitting him against a large number of characters, including his archenemy Bugs Bunny, whom he frequently attempts to hunt, but usually ends up injuring and humiliating himself. He exhibits the speech sound disorder known as rhotacism, replacing his Rs and Ls with Ws thus referring to Bugs Bunny as a "scwewy" (screwy) or "wascawwy (rascally) wabbit." Elmer's signature catchphrase is, "Shhh. Be vewy, vewy quiet, I'm hunting wabbits", as well as his trademark laugh.

The best known Elmer Fudd cartoons include Chuck Jones' work What's Opera, Doc?, the Rossini parody Rabbit of Seville, and the "Hunting Trilogy" of "Rabbit Season/Duck Season" shorts (Rabbit Fire, Rabbit Seasoning, and Duck! Rabbit, Duck!) with Elmer Fudd, Bugs Bunny, and Daffy Duck. An earlier prototype of a character named Egghead had some of Elmer's recognizable aspects before the character's more conspicuous features were set.

== Character History ==
=== Egghead ===
Tex Avery introduced a new character in his cartoon short Egghead Rides Again, released July 17, 1937. Egghead initially was depicted as having a bulbous nose, a voice like Joe Penner (provided by radio mimic Danny Webb) and an egg-shaped head. Many cartoon historians believe that Egghead evolved into Elmer over a period of a couple of years. However, animation historian Michael Barrier asserts that "Elmer Fudd was not a modified version of his fellow Warner Bros. character Egghead" and "the two characters were always distinct. That was evidenced by Elmer's early prototype being identified in a Warner publicity sheet for Cinderella Meets Fella (filed with the Library of Congress as a copyright description) as 'Egghead's brother.'" Barrier also said that "The Egghead-Elmer story is actually a little messy, my sense being that most of the people involved, whether they were making the films or publicizing them, not only had trouble telling the characters apart but had no idea why they should bother trying."

Egghead made his second appearance in 1938's Daffy Duck & Egghead and was teamed with Warner Bros.' newest cartoon star Daffy Duck. Avery retired the character in favor of Fudd, but Cal Dalton continued to use Egghead in his cartoons, such as in A-Lad-In Bagdad (1938) and Count Me Out (1938), until Friz Freleng returned to the studio, replaced Dalton and Ben Hardaway, and pivoted to use Elmer Fudd instead. Egghead shifted from being bald, to having a Moe Howard haircut, and always has a huge egg-shaped head. Egghead returned decades later in the compilation film Daffy Duck's Quackbusters, while going back to being bald again and redesigned into looking like Elmer Fudd and wearing Elmer Fudd's Clothes and Derby Hat. More recently, he also made a cameo appearance at the end of Looney Tunes: Back in Action and was also given in his own story, which starred him alongside Pete Puma, in the Looney Tunes comic book. An animation historian suggested that the Egghead character was based on Ripley's Believe It or Not! cartoonist and entertainer Robert Ripley.

Egghead has the distinction of being the first recurring character created for Leon Schlesinger's Merrie Melodies series (to be followed by such characters as Sniffles, Inki, Elmer Fudd, and even Bugs Bunny), which had previously contained only one-shot characters, although during the Harman-Ising era, Foxy, Goopy Geer, and Piggy each appeared in a few Merrie Melodies.

One of Egghead's final appearances is in Count Me Out.

==== Voice actors for Egghead ====
- Mel Blanc (as Egghead; Egghead Rides Again, and Egghead when he "woo-hoos" in Daffy Duck & Egghead).
- Danny Webb (as Egghead; Egghead Rides Again, Daffy Duck & Egghead, A-Lad-In Bagdad, and Count Me Out).
- Mark Kausler voices Egghead in Daffy Duck's Quackbusters.

=== Elmer Fudd in his true early years ===
Early prototype of "Elmer Fudd" as he appeared in 1939's A Day at the Zoo

In 1937, Tex Avery created a very early version of Elmer Fudd and introduced him in Little Red Walking Hood, as a mysterious hero whistling everywhere he goes. In this cartoon, he had a derby hat, small squinty eyes, big reddish nose, a high collar around his neck, a green long sleeve shirt, green pants, and a bald circle-like human head. Avery intended him to be a distinct character from Egghead, making frequent and highly disruptive cameo appearances for the sake of a running gag in cartoons in 1938 such as in The Isle of Pingo Pongo (1938), Cinderella Meets Fella (1938), A Feud There Was (the first time he is fully called "Elmer Fudd") (1938), Johnny Smith and Poker-Huntas (1938), Hamateur Night (1939), A Day at the Zoo (1939), and Believe It or Else (1939), mostly as a "running gag" character. In A Feud There Was (1938), Elmer made his entrance riding a motor scooter with the words "Elmer Fudd, Peacemaker" displayed on the side, the first onscreen use of that name. Elmer then appeared on early Looney Tunes merchandise and books in 1938 and 1939. Elmer has been named as such since his debut on lobby cards; he was named after Elmer Wait, one of Avery's animators who died after briefly becoming lead animator in 1938.

In the 1939 cartoon Dangerous Dan McFoo, a new voice actor, Arthur Q. Bryan, was hired to provide the voice of the hero dog character. It was in this cartoon that the popular "milk-sop" wabbit voice of Elmer Fudd was created. Sometime later on in this year, some new drawings and redesigns of Elmer Fudd were being created by a character designer, Charlie Thorson.

=== Elmer emerges ===
Elmer Fudd, resembling his prototype early in his career, is annoyed by a rabbit in Elmer's Candid Camera.

In 1940, Chuck Jones refined the character for Elmer's Candid Camera, his first cartoon to co-star Bugs Bunny, beginning their long-standing rivalry. Later that year, he appeared in Friz Freleng's Confederate Honey (where he is called Ned Cutler) and The Hardship of Miles Standish where his voice and Little Red Walking Hood-like appearance were still the same. Jones would use this Elmer one more time, in 1941's Elmer's Pet Rabbit; its other title character is labeled as Bugs Bunny but is also identical to his prototype in Camera. In the interim, the two starred in A Wild Hare. Elmer has a more refined voice, a trimmer figure (designed by Bob Givens, which would be reused soon later in Jones' Good Night Elmer, this time without a red nose) and his familiar hunting clothes. This design is the most widely used and remains his primary design to this day.

Elmer in Rabbit Fire (1951)

Elmer's role in the two films: that of would-be hunter, dupe and foil for Bugs remained his main role forever afterwards and although Bugs Bunny was called upon to outwit many more worthy opponents, Elmer somehow remained Bugs' classic nemesis, despite (or because of) his legendary gullibility, small size, short temper, and shorter attention span. In Rabbit Fire, he declares himself a vegetarian, hunting for sport only. In future appearances such as Rabbit Rampage (1955), Elmer has professed to hunt Bugs Bunny solely for retribution for his humiliation.

Elmer was usually cast as a hapless hunter, armed with a double-barreled shotgun (albeit one which could be fired much more than twice without being reloaded) and creeping through the woods "hunting wabbits". In a few cartoons, though, he assumed a completely different persona—a wealthy industrialist type, occupying a luxurious penthouse, or, in one episode involving a role reversal, a sanitarium — into which Bugs would, of course, somehow find his way. In Dog Gone People, he had an ordinary office job working for demanding boss "Mister Cwabtwee". In another cartoon (A Mutt in a Rut) he appeared to work in an office and had a dog he called "Wover Boy", whom he took hunting, though Bugs did not appear. (Elmer also has a hunting dog in To Duck or Not to Duck; in that film, the dog is named Laramore.)

Elmer has occasionally outwitted Bugs Bunny and humiliated him in return, especially when brainwashing is involved. In The Hare-Brained Hypnotist (1942), he hypnotizes Bugs into thinking he is an airplane and literally flying off while being oblivious to his condition. In Hare Brush (1956), a millionaire Elmer feigns insanity by impersonating a rabbit in order to avoid punishment from tax evasion; he manipulates Bugs Bunny into impersonating him through hypnosis, ultimately having Bugs arrested by the Internal Revenue Service for his crimes.

=== Fat Elmer ===
For a short time in the 1941–1942 season, Avery redesigned Elmer into a heavy-set, beer-bellied character, patterned after Arthur Q. Bryan's real-life appearance. This redesign persisted for five cartoons: Wabbit Twouble, The Wacky Wabbit, The Wabbit Who Came to Supper, Any Bonds Today? and Fresh Hare. He was also modified to carry no ill will towards Bugs, who in turn provokes Elmer purely for his own amusement. This redesign was not popular and was quickly reverted.

== Elmer-speak ==
He nearly always mispronounced consonants [r] and [l], pronouncing them as [w] instead (a trait that also characterized Tweety) when he would talk in his slightly raspy voice. This trait was prevalent in the Elmer's Candid Camera and Elmer's Pet Rabbit cartoons, where the writers would give him exaggerated lines such as "My, that weawwy was a dewicious weg of wamb," to further exaggerate his qualities as a harmless nebbish. The writers often gave him lines filled with those letters, such as doing Shakespeare's Romeo as "What wight thwough yonduh window bweaks!" or Wagner's Ride of the Valkyries as "Kiww the wabbit, kiww the wabbit, kiww the wabbit...!" or "The Beautifuw Bwue Danube, by Johann Stwauss", Stage Door Cartoon's line "Oh, you dubbuh-cwossing wabbit! You tweachewous miscweant!" or the name of actress "Owivia deHaviwwand".

== Later appearances ==
Arthur Q. Bryan died in 1959, but the character was not completely retired from the Golden Age of American Animation until Crows' Feat (1962). Elmer made appearances in several television specials in the 1970s and 1980s, and some cameo roles in two of the Looney Tunes feature-film compilations. Elmer made a brief headshot cameo appearance in the final scene of Who Framed Roger Rabbit (1988) with the other famous characters.

Elmer appeared frequently in the animated series Tiny Toon Adventures as a teacher at Acme Looniversity, where he was the idol and favorite teacher of Elmyra Duff, the slightly deranged animal lover who resembles Elmer in basic head design, name and lack of intellect. On the other hand, a younger version of him makes a single appearance in the episode "Plucky's Dastardly Deed", and is named "Egghead Jr", the "smartest kid in class". Elmer made cameos in Animaniacs, one in "Turkey Jerky", and another in the Pinky and the Brain short, "Don't Tread on Us".

Elmer also had a guest starring appearance in Histeria! in the episode "The Teddy Roosevelt Show", in a sketch where he portrayed Gutzon Borglum. This sketch depicts Elmer/Gutzon's construction of Mount Rushmore, accompanied by Borglum's son Lincoln, portrayed by Loud Kiddington. Elmer made another appearance on Histeria!, this time in his traditional role, during a sketch where the bald eagle trades places with the turkey during Thanksgiving weekend, featured in the episode "Americana".

Elmer also appeared in The Sylvester & Tweety Mysteries in the first-season episode "A Ticket to Crime" as detective Sam Fudd; at the end he took off his clothes and turned into Elmer. Elmer appears as part of the TuneSquad team in Space Jam (1996). In one scene during the game, he and Yosemite Sam shoot out the teeth of one of the Monstars dressed in black suits while Misirlou is heard in the background, a reference TNG be early films of Quentin Tarantino.

Elmer took on a more villainous role in Looney Tunes: Back in Action (2003). He first appears as Bugs Bunny and Daffy Duck's co-star in a new movie, where he shoots Daffy repeatedly, and is later seen shooting Bugs per the film's script after Daffy's firing. He later appears in the Louvre museum, where he reveals himself to be a secret agent for the Acme Corporation. Elmer chases Bugs and Daffy through the paintings in the Louvre museum, taking on the different art styles as they do so. At the end, Elmer forgets to change back to his normal style after jumping out of the pointillist painting Sunday Afternoon on the Island of La Grande Jatte by Georges Seurat, allowing Bugs to easily disintegrate Elmer by blowing a fan at him. A four-year-old version of Elmer was featured in the Baby Looney Tunes episode "A Bully for Bugs", where he kept taking all of Bugs' candy, and also bullied the rest of his friends. He was also shown with short blond hair. He appeared in most of the songs.

An even more villainous Elmer appeared in two episodes of Duck Dodgers as The Mother Fudd, an alien who would spread a disease that caused all affected by it to stand around laughing like Elmer and resemble a grey-skinned version of him (a parody of the Flood in Halo and the Borg in Star Trek). In Loonatics Unleashed, his descendant, Electro J. Fudd, tried to prove himself the universe's greatest hunter by capturing Ace Bunny, but settled for Danger Duck instead. Elmer himself also makes an appearance in the form of a photo which shows he presumably died at the hands of a giant squirrel.

In December 2009, Elmer made an appearance in a GEICO commercial where the director tells him to say rabbits instead of "wabbits". Pushed to the edge, Elmer exclaims, "This diwector is wubbing me the wong way!" He was again voiced by Billy West.

Elmer Fudd appears in The Looney Tunes Show, voiced by Billy West. Portrayed as a wealthy businessman coming home after a hard day's work in the "Merrie Melodies" part of the episode "Best Friends", he sings about his love of "gwiwwed cheese" sandwiches. He later had a brief cameo appearance in "Fish and Visitors" as a weather forecaster briefly exclaiming about the rainy weather and doing his famous chuckle at the end. In "Working Duck", Elmer Fudd appeared as a newsman where he reports that Daffy Duck was fired from his position as a security guard after falling asleep during a nighttime bank robbery in which $10 million was stolen. Later on, Elmer Fudd reports that EnormoCorp went out of business due to the worst business decision in the history of business decisions caused by its CEO Daffy Duck (who succeeded the previous CEO Foghorn Leghorn who retired) where he went with the "Proceed as Planned" choice instead of the "Delay the Merger" choice when he mistook Pete Puma as the new muffin man. As a result of this, Elmer mentioned that 10,000 of its workers are now out of a job and states that experts fear that the world economy could collapse. Elmer also states that disgraced CEO Daffy Duck could not be reached for a comment. In "A Christmas Carol", Elmer Fudd reports on Foghorn Leghorn's plans to end the heat wave on Christmas. Elmer Fudd later joins the other characters in the Christmas song called "Christmas Rules" at the end of the episode. In "Dear John", Elmer Fudd reports on Daffy Duck winning a spot on the city council. Elmer Fudd later reports on Daffy Duck's apparent death where he supposedly lost control of his parade float and drove into the St. Bastian River. In "The Black Widow", Elmer Fudd reports on the theft of the Hillhurst Diamond from the museum caused by someone called "The Black Widow".

On June 8, 2011, Elmer starred in the 3-D short Daffy's Rhapsody with Daffy Duck. That short was going to precede the film Happy Feet Two, but was instead shown with Journey 2: The Mysterious Island. Elmer Fudd appears in Looney Tunes: Rabbits Run, voiced again by Billy West. He appears as a spy working for the Mexican general Foghorn Leghorn.

In the 2017 DC Comics/Looney Tunes crossover books, an alternate version of Elmer Fudd was created for a story in which the character was designed more for the DC Universe and was pitted against Batman in the Batman/Elmer Fudd Special. In the story, Elmer is a bounty hunter from the countryside who moved to Gotham to make ends meet. He considered retiring when he fell in love with Silver St. Cloud, but she was killed by hitman Bugs "The Bunny". He goes to a bar called Porky's (which has attendants that are humanoid versions of other famous Looney Tunes) to kill Bugs, who informs him that Bruce Wayne hired him to kill Silver. Elmer shoots Bruce at a party, leading to Batman confronting him in his apartment and defeating the gunman in a fight. After Elmer tells Batman about Silver's death, the two return to Porky's and take out most of the crowd before confronting Bugs. The three are shocked to find Silver in the bar herself, where she revealed that she left Bruce and Elmer because of their dangerous lifestyles and had Bugs fake her death. The story ends with all three men requesting a glass of carrot juice from Porky. In the issue's backup story, Bugs, Elmer, and Batman re-enact the famous "Rabbit Season, Duck Season" bit with Batman replacing Daffy as Bugs tells Elmer it is "Bat Season". After getting shot by Elmer too many times, Batman takes Bugs' advice and makes it Robin season, leading Elmer to pursue the Dark Knight's sidekicks instead.

Elmer Fudd appears in New Looney Tunes, voiced by Jeff Bergman. Elmer Fudd was depicted without his trademark double-barreled shotgun in the first season of Looney Tunes Cartoons on the streaming service, HBO Max. The series executive producer and showrunner, Peter Browngardt, said the character could continue to use cartoon violence, such as dynamite and Acme related paraphernalia. The absence of the shotgun has garnered both acclaim and controversy. By 2021, his shotgun was reinstated in the show's second season. He is again voiced by Jeff Bergman in the series.

Elmer appears in the Bugs Bunny Builders episode "Bugs and the Beanstalk", voiced once again by Jeff Bergman. Here, he is depicted as a giant who Bugs discovers in the sky after climbing up through a giant carrot that he grew in his garden with three magic beans. Elmer wants a place to store his special possessions, so Bugs gathers up the Looney Builders to build a castle for Elmer, even as his new home. He also appears in the 2026 film Coyote vs. Acme as a member of the US Senate.

In April 2026, it was announced that a new theatrical animated short called Daffy Season, which is about Elmer Fudd being obsessed with soccer, would premiere at the 2026 Annecy Festival, making it the first theatrical short featuring Elmer since Daffy's Rhapsody. The film is directed by Todd Wilderman and Hamish Grieve.

== Portrayal ==
Fudd was originally voiced by Mel Blanc between 1937 and 1938, Danny Webb between 1938 and 1939 (only in Cinderella Meets Fella (1938) and Believe It or Else (1939)), Roy Rogers in 1938, only doing a singing voice in A Feud There Was. From 1939 to 1959, Fudd's voice was provided by radio actor Arthur Q. Bryan. On seven occasions during Bryan's lifetime, the voice was provided by Blanc: in Good Night Elmer (1940), Blanc did Elmer's crying; in The Wacky Wabbit (1942), Blanc did Fudd's screams of fear; in The Big Snooze (1946), Blanc spoke as Fudd crying, "Oh, agony, agony!"; for The Scarlet Pumpernickel (1950), only a single line was needed, and bringing in Bryan was not cost effective; in Quack Shot (1954), Blanc did Elmer's Peter Lorre-esque laugh after he is shot in the face by his toy battleship; in Wideo Wabbit, Blanc did Elmer's cry of pain; and in What's Opera, Doc?, Elmer's furious scream "SMOG!" was dubbed by Blanc, although Bryan had voiced the rest of the part. In The Stupid Cupid (1944), since Elmer has no dialogue in the cartoon, Frank Graham provided his laugh. Later, during the musician's union strike of 1958, Dave Barry did the voice for Elmer's co-starring appearance in Pre-Hysterical Hare, as during production of the cartoon, Bryan was unavailable due to either feeling ill or appearing on a lot of television shows in New York at the time. Elmer was originally going to be voiced in that cartoon by Daws Butler.

In 1959, Bryan died at age 60, and Hal Smith was selected to replace him as Elmer in the theatrical shorts, but only two cartoons were recorded by the new actor–Dog Gone People (1960) and What's My Lion? (1961), with Blanc doing Fudd's crying and gurgling in two scenes in the former cartoon. In more recent years other voice actors have alternated as Elmer's voice, Bryan's characterization remains the definitive one. He was never credited onscreen, because Blanc had a clause in his contract that required him to receive a screen credit and, perhaps inadvertently, denied the same to other voice performers.

Blanc would take on the role regularly in the 1960s, 1970s and 1980s, supplying Elmer's voice for new footage in The Bugs Bunny Show (while Smith voiced the character in the commercials until 1965 when Blanc took up the role full time), The Porky Pig Show, compilation feature films and similar television specials, as well as some all-new specials. Blanc initially did not want to imitate Bryan, believing that to be stealing from another actor, but performed the role when Warner Bros. could not find anyone else. Rather than imitating Bryan's voice, he did his own interpretation of Elmer's voice. He admitted in his autobiography that he found the voice difficult to get "right", never quite making it his own; Blanc's Elmer voice sounded deep and gravelly in the 1960s and 1970s, but began sounding closer to Bryan's portrayal, beginning with Bugs Bunny's Valentine (1979). In Speechless (1989), the famous lithograph issued following Blanc's death, Elmer is not shown among the characters bowing their heads in tribute to Blanc.

=== Other voice actors ===
Beside Bryan, numerous other actors have voiced Elmer, including:

- Mel Blanc (as Prototype-Elmer; Little Red Walking Hood, The Isle of Pingo Pongo, A Feud There Was, Johnny Smith and Poker-Huntas, Hamateur Night, A Day at the Zoo; as Elmer; Good Night, Elmer, screaming in The Wacky Wabbit, saying, "Oh, agony, agony!" in The Big Snooze, The Scarlet Pumpernickel, laughing in Quack Shot, screaming in Wideo Wabbit, screaming, "SMOG!" in What's Opera, Doc?, one line in A Mutt in a Rut, crying and gurgling in Dog Gone People, The Bugs Bunny Show, The Porky Pig Show, American Airlines commercials, Daffy Duck and Porky Pig Meet the Groovie Goolies, The New Adventures of Bugs Bunny, 4 More Adventures of Bugs Bunny, Bugs Bunny’s High-Fructose Christmas Record, Bugs Bunny Vitamins commercials, A Connecticut Rabbit in King Arthur's Court, Looney Tales, Bugs Bunny's Valentine, Bugs Bunny's Looney Christmas Tales, Bugs Bunny's Bustin' Out All Over, Portrait of the Artist as a Young Bunny, The Bugs Bunny Mystery Special, Six Flags Great America commercial, Sony Electronics commercial, Signet Bank commercial, Looney Tunes Learn About Shapes and Sizes, Looney Tunes Learn About Numbers, Looney Tunes Learn About Sing-Along Songs, Dance Party USA, Oldsmobile commercial, Warner Cinema commercial)
- Danny Webb (as Prototype-Elmer; Cinderella Meets Fella, and Believe It or Else)
- Roy Rogers (as Prototype-Elmer; singing voice in A Feud There Was)
- Frank Graham (The Stupid Cupid)
- Gilbert Mack (Golden Records records, Bugs Bunny Songfest)
- Dave Barry (Pre-Hysterical Hare)
- Hal Smith (Post Cereal Alpha-Bits commercials, Tang commercials, Dog Gone People, What's My Lion?, Kool-Aid commercials)
- Unknown (Bugs Bunny Exercise and Adventure Album)
- Paul Kuhn (Bugs Bunny's Wild World of Sports)
- Darrell Hammond ("Wappin'")
- Noel Blanc (You Rang? answering machine messages, Family Guy Presents Stewie Griffin: The Untold Story, Family Guy)
- Jeff Bergman (Happy Birthday, Bugs!: 50 Looney Years, Holiday Inn commercial, Tiny Toon Adventures, Tyson Foods commercial, Box-Office Bunny, Bugs Bunny's Overtures to Disaster, (Blooper) Bunny, Invasion of the Bunny Snatchers, Cartoon Network bumpers, Mad, Looney Tunes Dash, Wun Wabbit Wun, New Looney Tunes, Ani-Mayhem, Looney Tunes Cartoons, Bugs Bunny Builders, Daffy Season)
- Greg Burson (Tiny Toon Adventures, Looney Tunes River Ride, Yosemite Sam and the Gold River Adventure!, Bugs Bunny: Rabbit Rampage, Have Yourself a Looney Tunes Christmas, Looney Tunes B-Ball, The Sylvester & Tweety Mysteries, Space Jam (additional lines), Bugs Bunny's Learning Adventures, Sheep, Dog 'n' Wolf, various commercials)
- Joe Alaskey (Tiny Toon Adventures: How I Spent My Vacation)
- Keith Scott (Toyota commercials, The Looney Tunes Radio Show, Looney Rock)
- Jim Meskimen (Bugs & Friends Sing the Beatles)
- Frank Welker (Animaniacs)
- Billy West (Space Jam, Bugs & Friends Sing Elvis, Warner Bros. Sing-Along: Quest for Camelot, Warner Bros. Sing-Along: Looney Tunes, Histeria!, The Looney Tunes Kwazy Christmas, Time Warner Cable commercials, The 1st 13th Annual Fancy Anvil Awards Show Program Special...Live!...In Stereo, Looney Tunes: Back in Action, Bah, Humduck! A Looney Tunes Christmas, A Looney Tunes Sing-A-Long Christmas, GEICO commercial, The Looney Tunes Show, Daffy's Rhapsody, Looney Tunes: Rabbits Run, various video games and webtoons)
- Loy Edge (You Don't Know Doc! ACME Wise-Guy Edition)
- Chris Edgerly (Drawn Together)
- Tom Kenny (Looney Tunes webtoons)
- Brian Drummond (Baby Looney Tunes)
- Quinton Flynn (Robot Chicken)
- Scott Innes (AT&T commercial)
- Trey Parker (South Park; as Disabled Kid #1)
- Kevin Shinick (Mad)
- James Arnold Taylor (one line in Daffy's Rhapsody)
- Gary Martin (Looney Tunes Take-Over Weekend promotion)
- Seth Green (Robot Chicken)
- Seth MacFarlane (Family Guy)
- Eric Bauza (Looney Tunes: World of Mayhem, Bugs Bunny in The Golden Carrot, Space Jam: A New Legacy, Bugs and Daffy's Thanksgiving Road Trip, Looney Tunes pinball machine, Looney Tunes: Wacky World of Sports, Tiny Toons Looniversity, Coyote vs. Acme)

== In popular culture ==
In the film Fletch Lives (1989), the eponymous character (while in disguise) gives his name as "Elmer Fudd Gantry".

In amateur radio, new amateurs' mentors are called "Elmers", putatively for superficial resemblance to the cartoon character, and perhaps Fudd's use of "broadcastable" euphemisms while (frequently) swearing.

== See also ==
- Elmer Fudd filmography
