= Stage Door Cartoon =

1944 film by Friz Freleng

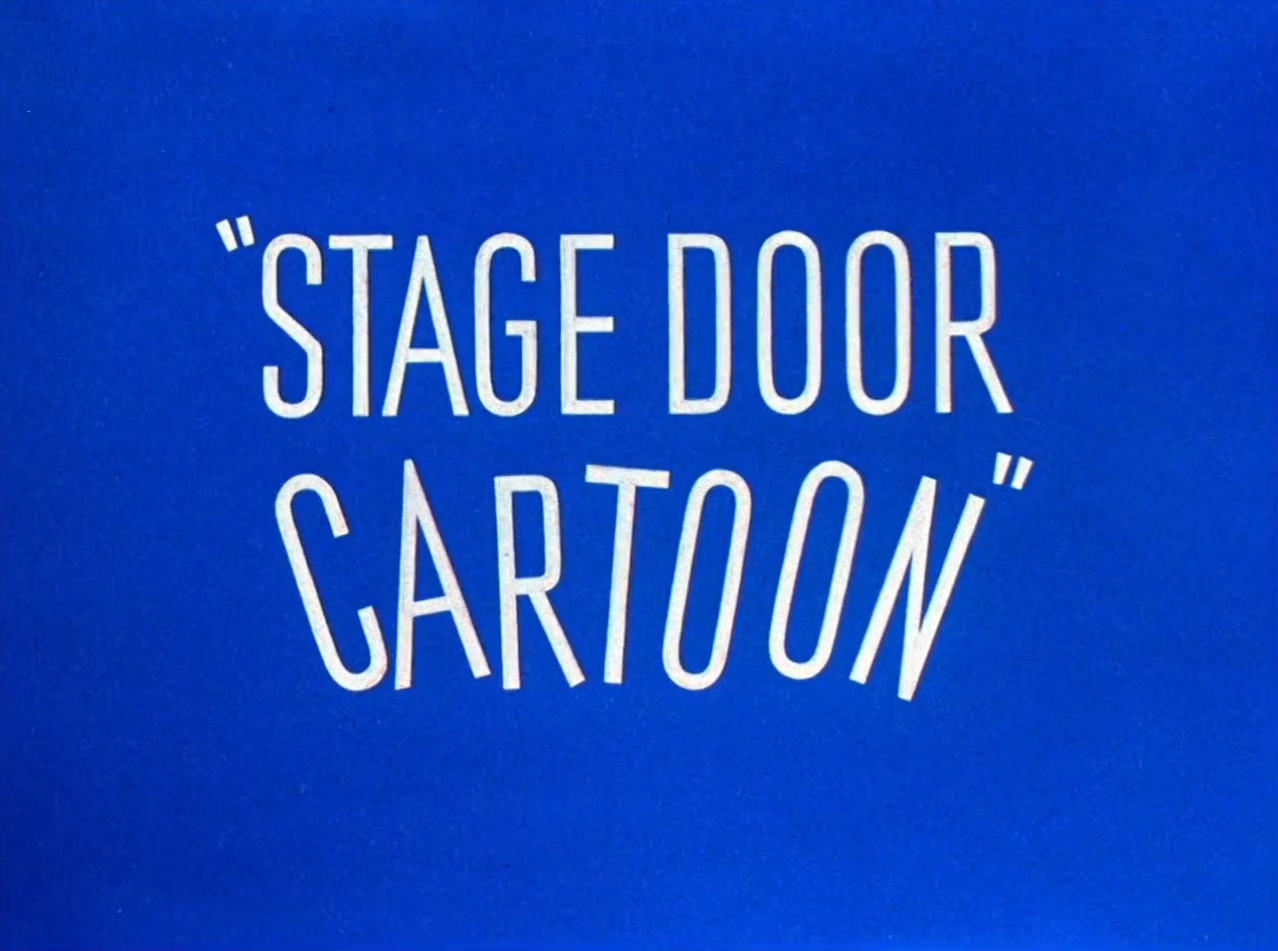
- Title card
- Directed by: I. Freleng
- Story by: Michael Maltese
- Starring: Mel Blanc
- Music by: Carl W. Stalling
- Animation by: Jack Bradbury
- Color process: Technicolor
- Production company: Warner Bros. Cartoons
- Distributed by: Warner Bros. Pictures; The Vitaphone Corporation
- Release date: December 30, 1944
- Running time: 8:04
- Language: English

Stage Door Cartoon is a 1944 Merrie Melodies cartoon directed by Friz Freleng. The short was released on December 30, 1944, and features Bugs Bunny and Elmer Fudd.

== Plot ==
Elmer Fudd attempts to catch Bugs Bunny with a carrot on a fish hook, but Bugs attaches the hook to Elmer's pants and reels Elmer in. Then Elmer chases Bugs into a theater; Bugs disguises himself as a can-can dancer, but Elmer recognizes Bugs, and prevents him from exiting the stage. Bugs dances, then plays the piano where Elmer hides and gets bounced around. Bugs tricks Elmer into high-diving into a glass of water. Elmer is tricked into wearing a Shakesperean costume and, prompted by Bugs, acts, then does poses and silly faces; Bugs prompts the booing audience to throw a tomato at Elmer.

Elmer is tricked into performing a striptease down to his shorts. Bugs disguises himself as a southern sheriff while the real sheriff arrests Elmer for "indecent southern exposure". But the sheriff stays for the Bugs Bunny cartoon on the movie screen. Elmer notices the scene with Bugs' disguise, thinks the sheriff is an impostor, and pulls off his pants – disrobing a real sheriff, who furiously escorts Elmer out of the theater with his rifle as Bugs conducts the orchestra in a finale.

== Home media ==
- VHS: Viddy-Oh! For Kids Cartoon Festivals: Bugs Bunny and Elmer Fudd Cartoon Festival Featuring "Wabbit Twouble"
- VHS: Cartoon Moviestars: Bugs Vs. Elmer
- LaserDisc: The Golden Age of Looney Tunes, Volume 3, Side 2, Bugs Bunny
- DVD: Hollywood Canteen (USA 1995 Turner print added as a bonus)
- DVD: Looney Tunes Golden Collection: Volume 2, Disc 4
- DVD: Looney Tunes Spotlight Collection: Volume 2, Disc 2
- Blu-ray: Looney Tunes Collector's Vault: Volume 3, Disc 2

== See also ==
- Looney Tunes and Merrie Melodies filmography (1940–1949)
- Bugs Bunny filmography
- Elmer Fudd filmography

| Preceded by The Old Grey Hare | Bugs Bunny Cartoons; 1944 | Succeeded by Herr Meets Hare |
