= The Stupid Cupid =

- Blue Ribbon title card
- Directed by: Frank Tashlin
- Story by: Warren Foster
- Starring: Mel Blanc; Dave Barry; Frank Graham; Dorothy Lloyd
- Music by: Carl W. Stalling
- Animation by: George Cannata
- Color process: Technicolor
- Production company: Warner Bros. Cartoons
- Distributed by: Warner Bros. Pictures; The Vitaphone Corporation
- Release date: November 25, 1944
- Running time: 6:37
- Language: English

The Stupid Cupid is a 1944 Warner Bros. Looney Tunes animated cartoon directed by Frank Tashlin. The cartoon was released on November 25, 1944, and stars Daffy Duck and Elmer Fudd.

== Plot ==
Elmer Fudd, portraying the mischievous god Cupid, delights in shooting arrows at male animals to make them fall in love with the nearest female, regardless of species. This leads to chaotic and sometimes tragic consequences, such as a dog falling for a cat, prompting the cat's dramatic reaction. Amidst this chaos, Daffy Duck sings "Don't Sweetheart Me" by Lawrence Welk.

Elmer's antics continue as he tries to shoot Daffy, but he complains that he is now henpecked due to being forced into marriage and becoming the father of many ducklings, including a two-headed one, the last time he was shot. He then traps Elmer in his own hat. Undeterred, Elmer seeks revenge by shooting a giant arrow at Daffy, causing further chaos and misunderstandings involving a hen and her rooster husband. The cycle of chaos and retaliation repeats as Elmer persists in his mischievous schemes.

== Voice Cast ==
- Mel Blanc as Daffy Duck / Horse / Dog / Cat / Rooster
- Frank Graham as Cupid Elmer Fudd laughing
- Dorothy Lloyd as Birds Whistling (uncomfirmed)

== Production notes ==
=== Voice acting ===
Elmer is ordinarily voiced by Arthur Q. Bryan, but since the character has no dialogue in this cartoon, Frank Graham provides Elmer's laugh.

Elmer reprises his role as Cupid in the Tiny Toon Adventures episode "Spring in Acme Acres" (1990). In the segment "Love Among the Toons", he tricks dullard Concord Condor into temporarily taking over his job.

=== Lost ending ===
When The Stupid Cupid was reissued, a "Blue Ribbon" title card was added to the opening sequence, and an ending scene is believed to have been removed. Theories speculate the cartoon originally had the special ending theme before the Blue Ribbon reissue rather than a fade out. This can only be proven with an original print.

According to historian Greg Ford, when Daffy is stuck between a hen and a rooster who is inadvertently kissing him at the end of the short, Daffy originally turned to face the audience, saying "If you haven't tried it, don't knock it." It is unknown if this gag was removed from the release print or the Blue Ribbon reissue.

== Reception ==
Animation historian Martin Goodman writes, "Though this farcical short contains some shoddy animation, Frank Tashlin's imaginative direction and Warren Foster's hilarious dialogue lift The Stupid Cupid above its shortcomings and into the realm of unforgettable comedy. As usual, Tashlin approaches his cartoon as a cinematic tableau in which wildly distorted characters experience exaggerated emotions... Outstanding timing, gags, and dialogue dominate the entire short."

== Home media ==
- VHS 1986 - Viddy-Oh! For Kids Cartoon Festivals: Daffy Duck Cartoon Festival featuring "Daffy Duck and the Dinosaur" - MGM/UA Home Video
- Laserdisc 1992 - The Golden Age of Looney Tunes: Volume 2 - MGM/UA Home Video
- DVD 2006 - Looney Tunes Golden Collection: Volume 4 (restored) - Warner Home Video
- Blu-Ray & DVD 2014 - Looney Tunes Platinum Collection: Volume 3 (restored) - Warner Home Video

== See also ==
- Daffy Duck filmography
- Elmer Fudd filmography
- Looney Tunes and Merrie Melodies filmography (1940–1949)
