= Jack Bradbury =

American animator and comic book artist (1914–2004)

- Born: John Morin Bradbury; December 27, 1914 Seattle, Washington, U.S.
- Died: May 15, 2004 (aged 89) Sylmar, California, U.S.
- Area: Cartoonist
- Spouse: Mary Jim Bradbury
- Children: 3

John Morin Bradbury (December 27, 1914 – May 15, 2004) was an American animator and comic book artist. Bradbury began working for Disney at age 20 and was responsible for key scenes in films like Pinocchio, Fantasia and Bambi. After working briefly for Friz Freleng at Warner Bros., he began working for Western Publishing in 1947, illustrating Little Golden Books, other children's books, and comic books for the Dell Comics and Gold Key Comics imprints along with the Disney Studio Program. Reportedly, Walt Disney told Western that they didn't need his approval for any of Bradbury's work. Also, Bob Clampett specifically requested Bradbury to illustrate the comic book adaptation of his show Time for Beany.

== Career ==
According to the book Walt's People - Volume 3: Talking Disney with the Artists who Knew Him by Didier Ghez, which presents a full reprint of an interview with Jack conducted by Klaus Strzyz in 1978, he never considered himself a "very good duck man", preferring to draw stories with Mickey Mouse and Goofy. When Mr. Strzyz asked him about the quality of 1940s, 1950s and 1960s Disney comic stories in comparison with the 1970s ones, he answered that the then later comics were far better in terms of quality, the only exception being Carl Barks' old comics. He also affirmed that he felt embarrassed when he saw some of his own early works.

Despite having insecurities about his art, Bradbury continued to hone his craft through the creation of other Disney characters. Bradbury illustrated "Family Tree" with Donald Duck and his feathered relatives. He created characters such as Blarney O'Duck (a cunning and obstinate sea captain), Cousin Daniel Duck (an old sheriff with rheumatism), Dick Duck (a self-important and terribly frank private detective), Myron O'Duck (a scoundrel who almost married Grandma Duck), and Aunt Myrtle (an absurdly strong but nice aunt of Daisy).

Eye problems forced Bradbury to cut back on his output after 1970, though he still continued to work on a few projects for Disney.

He died in 2004 from kidney failure.

== Filmography ==
Year	Title	Credits	Characters	Notes
1940	Pinocchio	Animator		Credited as John Bradbury
1940	Fantasia	Animator - Segment "The Pastoral Symphony"		
1942	Bambi	Animator		Credited as John Bradbury
1943	Jack-Wabbit and the Beanstalk (Short)	Animator		
1944	Meatless Flyday (Short)	Animator		
1944	Stage Door Cartoon (Short)	Animator		
