= Cinderella Meets Fella =

1938 film by Fred Avery

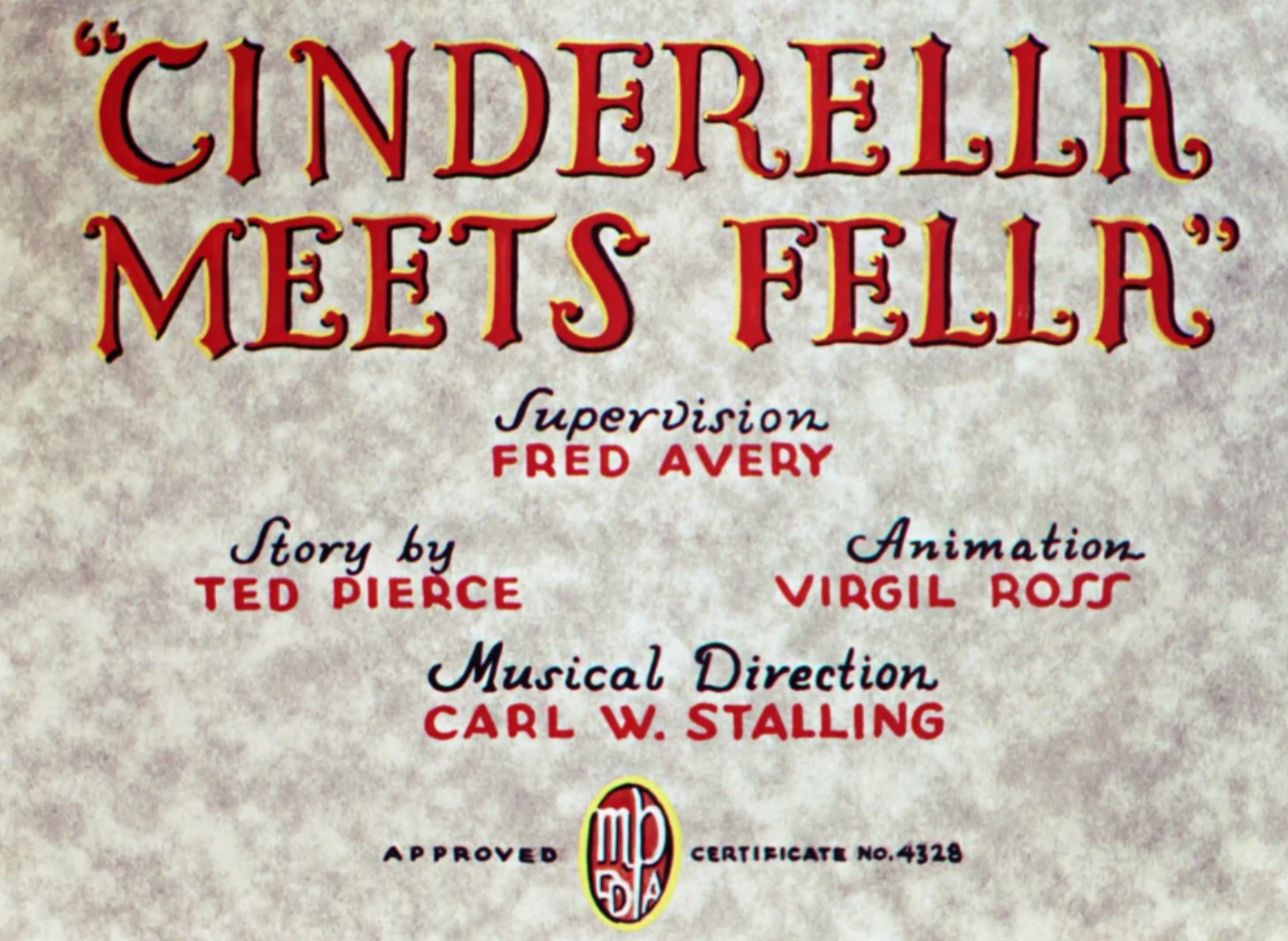
- Title card
- Directed by: Fred Avery
- Story by: Ted Pierce
- Produced by: Leon Schlesinger
- Starring: Mel Blanc; Bernice Hansen; Danny Webb; Elvia Allman; Fred Avery; Ted Pierce; Paul Taylor Choristers
- Music by: Carl W. Stalling
- Animation by: Virgil Ross
- Color process: Technicolor
- Production company: Leon Schlesinger Productions
- Distributed by: Warner Bros. Pictures; The Vitaphone Corporation
- Release date: July 23, 1938
- Running time: 8 min
- Country: United States
- Language: English

Cinderella Meets Fella is a 1938 American animated comedy short film directed by Fred Avery. It is a parody of the fairy tale Cinderella. The short was released on July 23, 1938. It is part of the Merrie Melodies series and the third cartoon to feature Elmer Fudd.

== Plot ==
The audience is invited to the story's ball dance and humorously encouraged to buy cheeseburgers from a nearby restaurant. Cinderella is forced to clean the house while her older sisters go to the ball. Noticing her fairy godmother to have not arrived on time, she calls the police, who find her drinking elsewhere and throw her into Cinderella's house. She immediately dresses up Cinderella in a fancy dress to her pleasure. She uses a canned pumpkin and rats summoned from a wall-mounted slot machine to attempt turning them into a horse and carriage, but turns them into Santa Claus and his reindeer by accident, then into a Wild West-style carriage that both deem satisfactory.

Cinderella arrives at the ball to everyone's applause, followed by Prince Charming, who is revealed to be Elmer Fudd. Cinderella embraces him as the duo dance, with Elmer unknowingly walking up a table before they go to a balcony where they kiss. At midnight after the cuckoo clock tries to disrupt the story by delaying it, Cinderella returns home and purposely drops a glass slipper to do the story justice. Elmer then spends the night finding Cinderella's house, which is illuminated with neon lights, and finds Cinderella to have "grown tired of waiting" and is watching a film produced by Warner Bros. Pictures in a cinema, which happens to be this cartoon. She enters the film from the audience and goes to the back of the theatre with Elmer.

== Voice cast ==
- Mel Blanc as Cuckoo Clock, Cops, Singing Palace Guard, Cinderella (screaming sounds)
- Bernice Hansen as Cinderella
- Danny Webb as Elmer Fudd, Singing Palace Guard, Lone Ranger Announcer
- Elvia Allman as Ugly Sister, Fairy Godmother
- Tex Avery as Police Radio Voice, Palace Guard, "Baby!"
- Tedd Pierce as Prince: "Baby!"

== Reception ==
Animation historian Greg Ford writes, "Cinderella certifies Avery's standing as a modernist in its distanced refurbishing of the hoary old Cinderella narrative."

== Home media ==
The film is available on the Looney Tunes Collector's Choice: Volume 3 Blu-ray.

== See also ==
- Elmer Fudd filmography
- Looney Tunes and Merrie Melodies filmography (1930–1939)
