= A Mutt in a Rut =

- Title screen featuring "Rover"
- Directed by: Robert McKimson
- Story by: Tedd Pierce
- Starring: Mel Blanc; Arthur Q. Bryan (uncredited)
- Edited by: Treg Brown
- Music by: Milt Franklyn
- Animation by: Warren Batchelder; Ted Bonnicksen; George Grandpré; Tom Ray
- Layouts by: Robert Gribbroek
- Backgrounds by: William Butler
- Color process: Technicolor
- Production company: Warner Bros. Cartoons
- Distributed by: Warner Bros. Pictures; The Vitaphone Corporation
- Release date: May 23, 1959 (USA)
- Running time: 6 minutes
- Language: English

A Mutt in a Rut is a Warner Bros. Looney Tunes animated short directed by Robert McKimson, released on May 23, 1959, featuring Elmer Fudd.

The story concerns Elmer's dog, "Rover", who, after watching a television show about dogs, is determined to protest how he is treated, but after going hunting, every intention to hurt or kill Elmer backfires on him...in a good way. This is one of only a few storylines featuring Elmer Fudd wherein nothing disastrous happens to Elmer.

== Plot ==
During Elmer's absence for work, Rover indulges in his favorite TV show, The Dog Lovers Hour, where host Carlton Canine discusses the bond between dogs and their masters. Disturbed by the show's portrayal of mistreated dogs and the ominous notion of hunting outings resulting in only one returning, Rover reacts with fury. He defaces Elmer's photo, displays defiance by trashing his slippers, and growls at Elmer when confronted.

Elmer, attributing Rover's behavior to neglect, resolves to take him hunting. However, Rover, fearing the hunting trip's outcome, plots to ensure his own safety by orchestrating accidents to harm Elmer. In a series of misadventures, Rover inadvertently saves Elmer's life by dispatching a bear and enduring an attack from a wild cat meant for Elmer. Despite Rover's attempts to eliminate Elmer, Elmer interprets each incident as acts of heroism, oblivious to Rover's true intentions. Rover's final scheme involving dynamite backfires, leading to his injury. Nevertheless, Elmer praises Rover for his bravery, promising him a medal.

Realizing his wrongdoing, Rover abandons his hostile actions. Upon returning home, Elmer tends to Rover's injuries with compassion. However, upon seeing The Dog Lovers Hour again, Rover, incensed by Canine's rhetoric, attacks him on live television, who then says “for obvious reasons this program is temporarily interrupted”, while yelping and running in pain while Rover bites his backside, and the cartoon ends when a curtain with the words THE END engraved on it closes.

== Home media ==
A Mutt in a Rut is available on the 2010 DVD Looney Tunes Super Stars' Foghorn Leghorn & Friends: Barnyard Bigmouth.

== See also ==
- List of cartoons featuring Elmer Fudd
- Looney Tunes and Merrie Melodies filmography (1950–1959)
