= Hamateur Night =

1939 film by Fred Avery

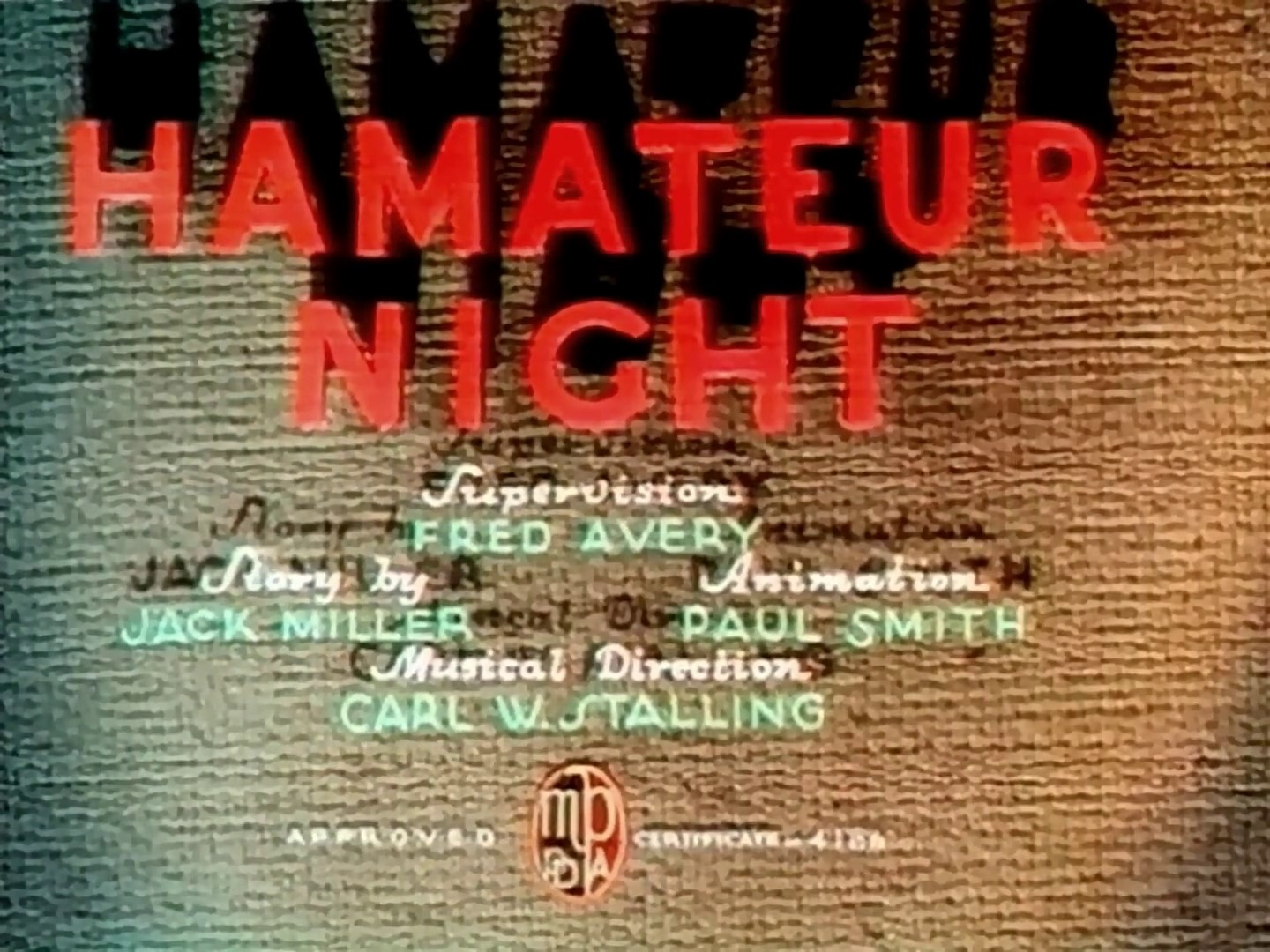
- Title card
- Directed by: Fred Avery
- Story by: Jack Miller
- Produced by: Leon Schlesinger
- Starring: Phil Kramer; Mel Blanc; Sara Berner; Fred Avery
- Music by: Carl W. Stalling
- Animation by: Paul Smith
- Color process: Technicolor
- Production company: Leon Schlesinger Productions
- Distributed by: Warner Bros. Pictures; The Vitaphone Corporation
- Release date: January 28, 1939
- Running time: 7 min
- Country: United States
- Language: English

Hamateur Night is a 1939 American animated comedy short film directed by Fred Avery. The short was released on January 28, 1939. It is part of the Merrie Melodies series and the sixth cartoon to feature Elmer Fudd.

The cartoon entered the public domain in 1968 when its last rightsholder, United Artists Television (successor-in-interest to Associated Artists Productions), failed to renew the original copyright within the required 28-year period.

== Plot ==
The film itself

At the Warmer Bros. theater, a jazz musical number where the conductor plays the music while his musicians conduct him occurs. The master of ceremonies presents an amateur talent show but is repeatedly interrupted by Elmer Fudd, who sings "She'll Be Coming 'Round the Mountain" off-key, only to be yanked away by a shepherd's crook.

No. 1a, The first performance is from Maestro Padawisky (a Leopold Stokowski-like composer), who purports to play the piano hands-free; he does nothing to hide that he is simply using a player piano, and is quickly disqualified by being sent to the basement and crushed to death by his piano. An audience member stretches his legs to relax, only for them to be crushed and disfigured by a hippo in front; he walks away to seek medical care while using his legs as stilts.

No. 1b, The next performance involves an opera tenor who rises off the stage as he sings higher notes, but is quickly disqualified as he falls to the ground. The hippo accidentally slams a patron's head into his body.

No. 2, swami who attempts to perform the Indian basket trick with help from Elmer, only to stab Elmer to death by accident.

No. 3, He offers a refund and successfully qualifies for some reason. A small flea on a dog then "Mary Had a Little Lamb" in a nearly-unintelligible squeaky voice, causing her to be disqualified quickly and fall to her death, which produces an absurdly large amount of noise given her stature. A trained dog that performs tricks and gives a speech at its owner's command is disqualified for being talkative. The hippo is humored and accidentally pushes the audience out of the theater.

No. 4, An actor keeps getting pelted with tomatoes as he tries to deliver the "To be, or not to be" soliloquy from Hamlet. He dodges one and freezes it in midair by reciting quickly, only to be hit by the second while he completes his line, and subsequently disqualified.

And No. 5, Two chickens perform a mangled, but earnest, rendition of the balcony scene from Romeo and Juliet, during which the actor playing Romeo stops to shoot the hippo dead for interrupting the performance. He finds out that the actress playing Romeo laughs the same way and shoots her offscreen; they qualify.

At the end of the night, as a voice vote is taken for the surviving contestants, Elmer wins. The master of ceremonies is shocked to see that Elmers fill the entire center section of the theater.

== Voice Cast ==
- Phil Kramer as The M.C.
- Mel Blanc as Elmer, Dog Audience Member, Singing Bird, Swami River, Fleabag McPoodle, Talking Dog, Shakespearean Fox, Romeo and audiences members whispering "Shhh... Padawisky's gonna play."
- Sara Berner as Juliet (impersonating Katharine Hepburn)
- Fred Avery as Laughing Hippo in Audience

It is currently unknown who provided the voice of Teeny, Tiny, Tinsy, Tinny-Tinny-Tin.

== Home media ==
- VHS - The Golden Age of Looney Tunes Vol. 3: Tex Avery (unrestored)
- Laserdisc - The Golden Age of Looney Tunes Vol. 1, Side 3 (unrestored)
- Streaming - HBO Max (restored, removed)
- Blu-Ray - Looney Tunes Collector's Choice: Volume 2 (restored)

== See also ==
- Elmer Fudd filmography
- Looney Tunes and Merrie Melodies filmography (1930–1939)
