= A Feud There Was =

1938 film by Fred Avery

- Original title card
- Directed by: Fred Avery
- Story by: Melvin Millar
- Produced by: Leon Schlesinger
- Starring: Mel Blanc; Roy Rogers; Billy Bletcher; Tex Avery; Gil Warren; Danny Webb; Edna Mae Harris
- Music by: Carl W. Stalling
- Animation by: Sid Sutherland
- Color process: Technicolor
- Production company: Leon Schlesinger Productions
- Distributed by: Warner Bros. Pictures; The Vitaphone Corporation
- Release date: September 24, 1938
- Running time: 7 min
- Country: United States
- Language: English

A Feud There Was is a 1938 American animated comedy short film directed by Fred Avery. The short was released on September 24, 1938. It is part of the Merrie Melodies series and the fourth cartoon to feature Elmer Fudd. It was re-released as a "Blue Ribbon" reissue in 1943 and 1952, rendering the original film lost; Avery kept a nitrate fragment of the original titles, which was sold by his family in 2004 to a private collector, but still available publicly at extremely low definition.

== Plot ==
Two families of hillbillies, the Weavers and the McCoys, are absurdly lazy people whose only motivation in life is to fight each other, to the point they do everything while snoozing outside of shooting each other. A fight is instigated by a Weaver child, causing both families to shoot at each other with rifles and deceptively advanced weaponry in a non-fatal manner, outside of three eggs under a hen which she mourns nonchalantly.

Some time later, peace activist Elmer Fudd rides to the two villages while yodeling in an attempt to stop the bloodshed, only to get shot in the back (non-fatally) by each family as he departs in a mockery of his efforts. A McCoy asks if there are any Weavers in the cinema's audience. A silhouetted Weaver then shoots at the McCoy. A McCoy crosses the boundary line and is sent backwards by a sheriff. Elmer successfully brings peace to both sides by having them team up to beat him up, which fails spectacularly as Elmer beats every Weaver and McCoy unconscious except for the Weaver in the audience, who shoots and fails to hurt him.

== Home media ==
- LaserDisc - The Golden Age of Looney Tunes, Volume 3, Side 8
- Blu-Ray - Looney Tunes Collector's Choice Volume 3

== See also ==
- Elmer Fudd filmography
- Looney Tunes and Merrie Melodies filmography (1930–1939)
