= Good Night Elmer =

1940 film by Charles Jones

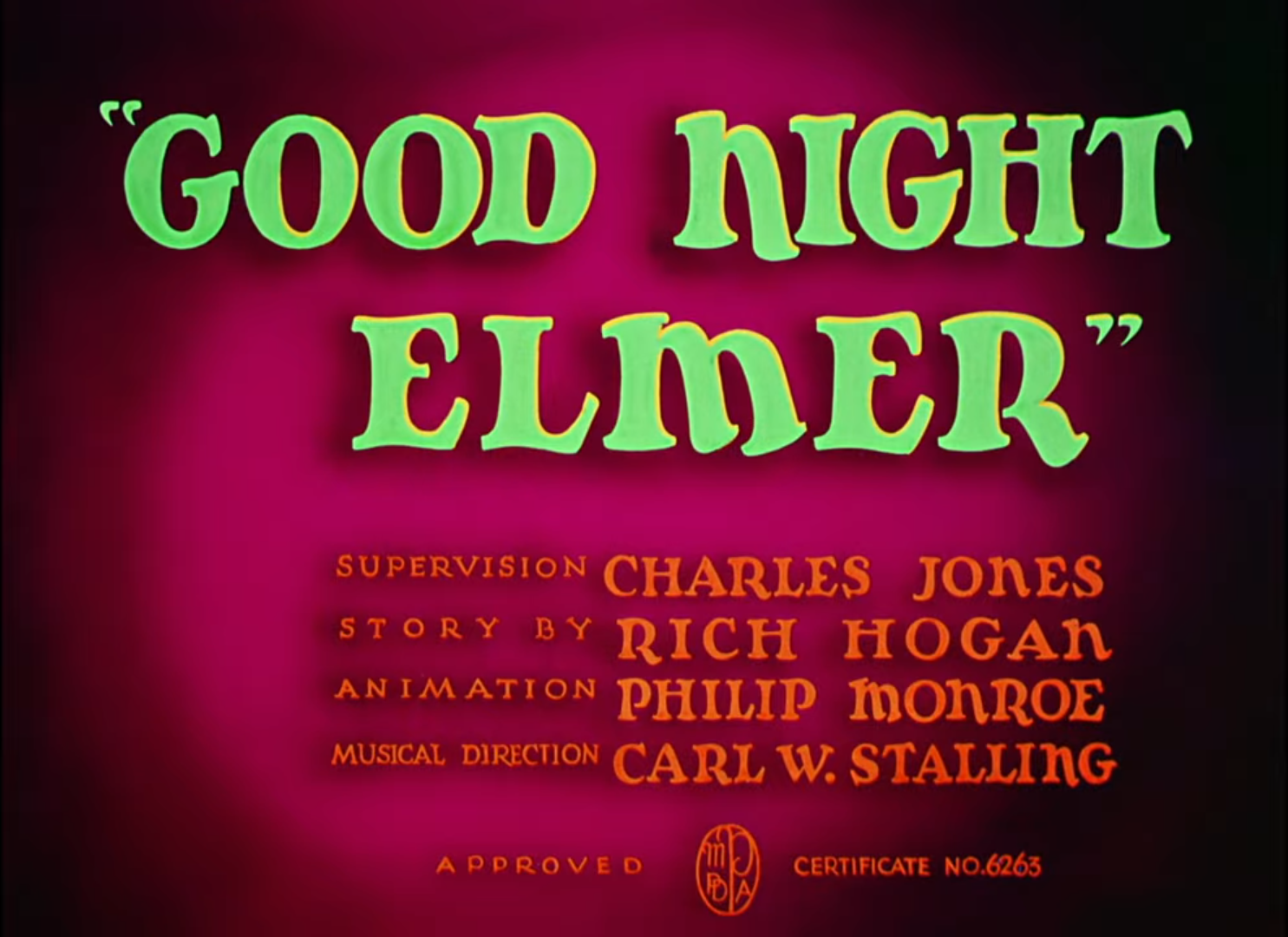
- Title card
- Directed by: Charles Jones
- Story by: Rich Hogan
- Produced by: Leon Schlesinger
- Starring: Mel Blanc
- Music by: Carl W. Stalling
- Animation by: Philip Monroe
- Color process: Technicolor
- Production company: Leon Schlesinger Productions
- Distributed by: Warner Bros. Pictures
- Release date: October 26, 1940
- Running time: 6 minutes
- Country: United States
- Language: English

Good Night Elmer is a 1940 American animated comedy short film directed by Charles Jones. The short was released on October 26, 1940. It is part of the Merrie Melodies series and the thirteenth cartoon to feature Elmer Fudd, who does not speak in this short. The film received criticism for its extremely slow pacing and poor timing.

== Plot ==
Elmer reads at night and returns to his bedroom. A candle hinders Elmer's attempts to remove his jacket, have it removed from his finger and his sleep in general as the flame refuses to be extinguished when needed. Elmer finally succeeds, but only at the expense of wrecking his bedroom in the process, and no sooner than he lies down, the sun comes up, precipitating a nervous breakdown in Elmer, who starts weeping and bawling.

== Reception ==
Good Night Elmer was produced around the time Chuck Jones was directing cartoons that bear similarities towards those made by Disney and Harman and Ising. In retrospect, the short was derided by critics and animation enthusiasts, particularly for its slow pacing and lack of jokes. A review from the Motion Picture Herald in 1942 called the cartoon a "Very poor reel. Not up to standard." Animation historians Jerry Beck and Will Friedwald also called the short "one of the most irritating cartoons ever made" in their book Looney Tunes and Merrie Melodies: A Complete Illustrated Guide to the Warner Bros. Cartoons.

Beck again discussed the cartoon on his website, Cartoon Research, in a post about his least favorite Warner Bros. shorts. He would state:

"BOR-ring! One of the slowest moving animated shorts I've ever seen. First he can't take off his jacket. Then he can't blow out the candle. The character [Elmer] is so stupid it's painful. The short ends with him crying in frustration (something we in the audience can identify with). It's the equivalent of an Edgar Kennedy live action comedy short… only without the humor, the pacing… or Edgar Kennedy. The animation is beautiful, but there is nothing – I repeat nothing – in this film that couldn't have been done in live action. A depressing film – far opposite of what Jones would start producing in a year or two."

== Home media ==
This short is available on disc 1 of the Looney Tunes Collector's Vault: Volume 1 Blu-ray set.

== See also ==
- Elmer Fudd filmography
- Looney Tunes and Merrie Melodies filmography (1940–1949)
