= Hare Brush =

1955 film

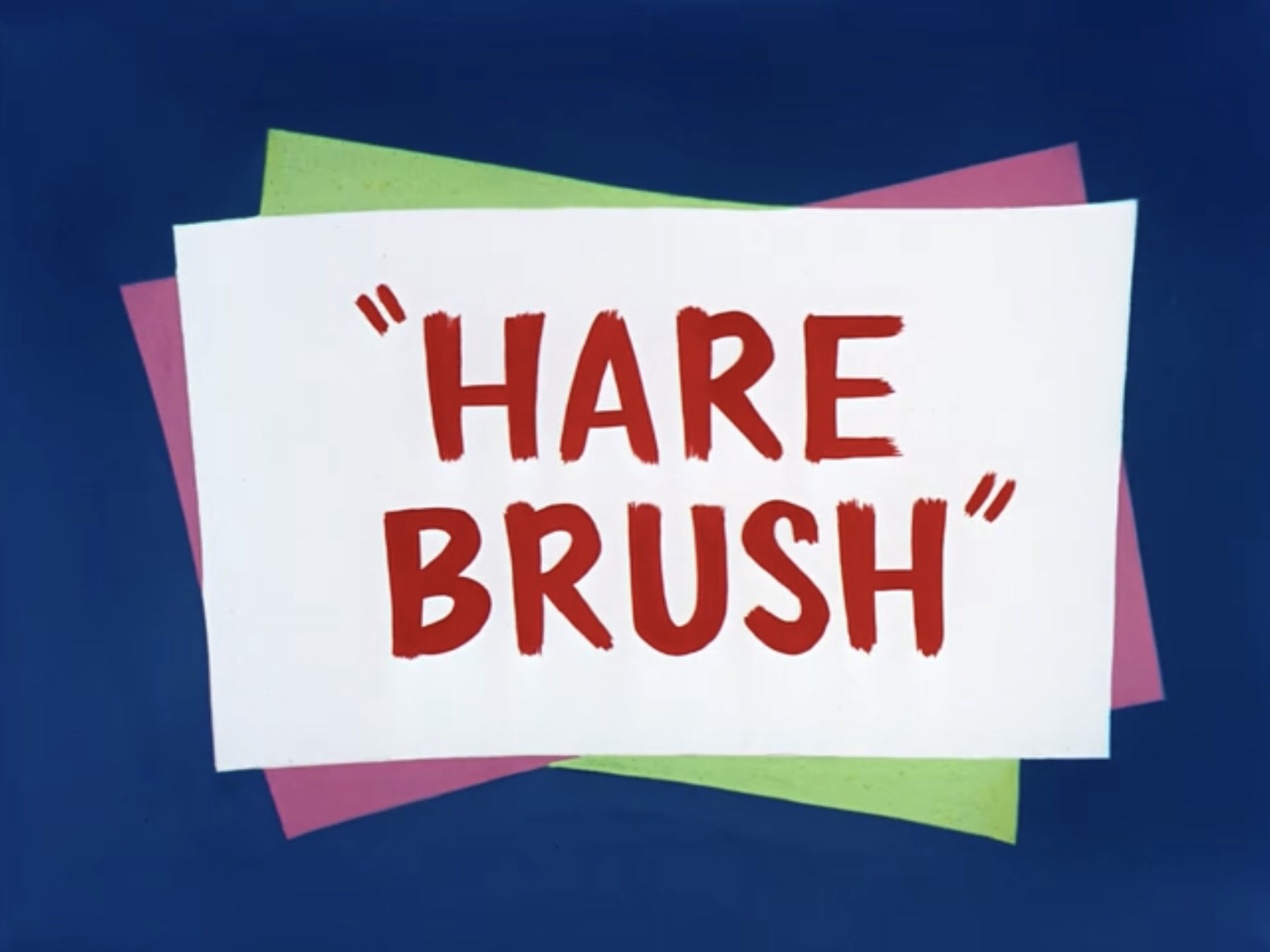
- Title card
- Directed by: I. Freleng
- Story by: Warren Foster
- Starring: Mel Blanc
- Music by: Milt Franklyn
- Animation by: Ted Bonnicksen; Art Davis; Gerry Chiniquy
- Layouts by: Hawley Pratt
- Backgrounds by: Irv Wyner
- Color process: Technicolor
- Production company: Warner Bros. Cartoons
- Distributed by: Warner Bros. Pictures
- Release date: May 7, 1955
- Running time: 7 minutes 23 seconds
- Language: English

Hare Brush is a 1955 Warner Bros. Merrie Melodies animated short directed by Friz Freleng. The short was released on May 7, 1955, and stars Bugs Bunny and Elmer Fudd.

Hare Brush pokes fun at Freudian psychoanalysis, psychiatric medication, hypnosis, and the cliches of other Bugs Bunny shorts. Along with What's Opera, Doc? and Rabbit Rampage, it is one of the few cartoons where Elmer gets the upper hand on Bugs. It is also the first short in the Merrie Melodies series to open with Milt Franklyn's re-arranged version of "Merrily We Roll Along"; the new fanfare would stay in use until 1964.

== Plot ==
Bugs, wearing what would be Elmer's hunting outfit, hunts Elmer, dressed in a rabbit costume.

At the Elmer J. Fudd Corporation's boardroom, the mental health of their CEO, Elmer Fudd, is discussed; he thinks he is a rabbit, and the board decides to commit him to the Fruitcake Sanitarium. In a rabbit costume, Elmer encounters Bugs Bunny and, using a carrot as bait, lures him into the sanitarium. Meanwhile, psychiatrist Dr. Oro Myicin arrives to treat Elmer, but mistakenly diagnoses Bugs—with "rabbitschenia". He gives Bugs a pill that makes him highly suggestible. Through repeated suggestion, Bugs comes to believe he is Elmer J. Fudd, millionaire owner of a mansion and yacht.

Declared cured, Bugs is released from the sanitarium dressed as Elmer. He hunts and ends up pursuing Elmer himself, who manages to escape. Ultimately, Bugs' charade is exposed when an IRS agent arrests him for tax evasion. Elmer breaks the fourth wall and tells the audience "I may be a scwewy wabbit, but I'm not going to Alcatwaz" as he hops away happily, as if he had planned the whole thing.

== Home media ==
Hare Brush was included on several Looney Tunes VHS cassette releases, as well as the Bugs Bunny 80th Anniversary Collection Blu-ray.

Preceded by Sahara Hare	Bugs Bunny Cartoons; 1955	Succeeded by Rabbit Rampage
