= Confederate Honey =

1940 film by Isadore Freleng

- Directed by: I. Freleng
- Story by: Ben Hardaway
- Produced by: Leon Schlesinger
- Starring: Mel Blanc; Sara Berner; Arthur Q. Bryan; Jim Bannon
- Narrated by: John Deering
- Music by: Carl W. Stalling
- Animation by: Cal Dalton
- Color process: Technicolor
- Production company: Leon Schlesinger Productions
- Distributed by: Warner Bros. Pictures
- Release date: March 30, 1940
- Running time: 8 min
- Country: United States
- Language: English

Confederate Honey is a 1940 American animated comedy short film directed by Isadore Freleng. It is part of the Merrie Melodies series, the tenth cartoon to feature Elmer Fudd and the first to be directed by Freleng since his return from Metro-Goldwyn-Mayer. It was intentionally planned by Ben Hardaway and Cal Dalton to feature Egghead, but Freleng's return let to them being demoted to storyman and animator; Freleng revamped the film to use Chuck Jones' redesign and characterization of Elmer Fudd. It is a sendup of Gone with the Wind.

== Plot ==
In 1861, Colonel O'Hairoil, a literal blueblood in the literally bluegrass country of Kentucky, presides over rich tobacco and cotton plantations. His black slaves slowly pick the cotton one boll at a time. The pride of the plantation is the Colonel's daughter, Crimson O'Hairoil, who is courted by many suitors, who leave in vain after having their horse parking ticket validated as they cannot pay the fine. Elmer Fudd portrays Ned Cutler, whose humility allows him to effortlessly win over Crimson. Their conversation is interrupted by the beginning of the American Civil War.

Ned joins the Confederate States Army. The war is picketed on the grounds that it is unfair to the Union, while civilians are equipped with blue "Union suits" (uniforms). An officer addresses his men, warning that the other side is pitching Stoneball Jackson, "a southpaw" against them, and if they win, they will meet the South in the Cotton Bowl. A trumpeter sounds a call, but things degenerate into a jazz band. A nervous Hugh Herbert Confederate officer paces in a tent with information coming in by telegraph—it turns out to be race results. Ned shoots a cannon, whose ball acts like a pinball in a machine. Meanwhile, the horse and attendant await Ned's return. The Colonel is dispirited to hear, on the radio, that "The Yanks" have won again, announced before a victory for Brooklyn (and all others rained out), and curses the Yankees.

Back at camp, Ned reads a letter and sighs. A signal rocket turns into an advertisement "After the battle eat Southern Fried Chicken at Mammy's Shack". Crimson, having promised to burn a light in the window for Ned, does so with such enthusiasm with a searchlight that she alarms Paul Revere, who rides away giving his famous warning. Four years later, it is revealed that Ned approached Crimson simply to have his parking ticket validated, causing her to humorously revoke it by stamping on his bald head.

== Reception ==
Motion Picture Exhibitor said on April 17, 1940: "By far the slap-happiest and most laugh-provoking reel of color cartoon ever put out by Leon Schlesinger (and that takes in a lot of territory). This take-off on Gone with the Wind had a projection room audience doubled up with laughter. It concerns the sad tale of Elmer Cutter, who is called to the colors before he has an opportunity to propose to Crimson O'Hairoil. He does return, however, but he doesn't get the gal who waited patiently for him. Ah, Woe! Excellent."

== Home media ==
- Laserdisc - The Golden Age of Looney Tunes, Vol. 3, Side 8: The Evolution of Egghead
- DVD - Errol Flynn Westerns Collection: Virginia City (USA 1995 Turner print added as a bonus, censored)

== See also ==
- Elmer Fudd filmography
- Looney Tunes and Merrie Melodies filmography (1940–1949)
