= The Hare-Brained Hypnotist =

1942 film by Isadore Freleng

- Title card
- Directed by: Isadore Freleng
- Story by: Michael Maltese
- Produced by: Leon Schlesinger
- Starring: Mel Blanc; Arthur Q. Bryan
- Music by: Carl W. Stalling
- Animation by: Philip Monroe
- Color process: Technicolor
- Production company: Leon Schlesinger Productions
- Distributed by: Warner Bros. Pictures
- Release date: October 31, 1942
- Running time: 6 min
- Country: United States
- Language: English

The Hare-Brained Hypnotist is a 1942 American animated comedy short film directed by Isadore Freleng. The short was released on October 31, 1942. It is part of the Merrie Melodies series, the seventeenth cartoon to feature Bugs Bunny and the eighteenth cartoon to feature Elmer Fudd, who reverts to his Chuck Jones design.

== Plot ==
While in the forest reading a book, Stalking Wild Game, Elmer comes across a passage describing hypnotism just before he bumps into a bear. He hypnotizes the bear into thinking he is a canary and the bear flies away. Bugs then asks Elmer, "What's up, doc?". Elmer states he has him right where he wants him and starts to hypnotize Bugs ("Heh, 'Dracula'", the rabbit observes). Bugs fools Elmer by giving him a balloon with long ears and he hears the bear he hypnotized earlier chirping and falls to the ground. Then he chases Bugs and fights over the gun. Then he cries on a tree and Bugs asks what's wrong. Elmer tells him that he (Bugs) won't cooperate when he tries to hypnotize him. Bugs says he will cooperate.

Then, as Elmer tries to hypnotize Bugs, Bugs hypnotizes him instead, and commands him to be a rabbit. Elmer then starts to act like Bugs, inducing Bugs to act like Elmer (after furiously declaring, "Who's the comedian in this picture, anyway?"), and the role-reversing chase ensues. Bugs then looks for Elmer, who is right behind him. Bugs talks to the audience while chewing three carrots—two of which are in Elmer's hands. Then the chase starts again, until Bugs manages to "un-hypnotize" Elmer. Elmer then runs away and all seems normal. Despite sneering at Elmer's ability to hypnotize him, Bugs suddenly notices his watch, exclaiming, "I'm overdue at the airport", and proceeds to take off and fly like an airplane. Bugs states "I'm the B-19!" and flies away toward the airport, humiliating himself in front of the audience as Elmer did hypnotize him before leaving.

== Home media ==
This short can be found on Volume 2 of the Looney Tunes Golden Collection.

== See also ==
- Bugs Bunny filmography
- Elmer Fudd filmography
- Looney Tunes and Merrie Melodies filmography (1940–1949)

Preceded by Fresh Hare	Bugs Bunny Cartoons; 1942	Succeeded by Case of the Missing Hare
