= Quack Shot =

- Directed by: Robert McKimson
- Story by: Phil DeLara
- Starring: Mel Blanc
- Music by: Carl Stalling
- Animation by: Rod Scribner; Phil DeLara; Charles McKimson; Herman Cohen
- Layouts by: Robert Givens
- Backgrounds by: Richard H. Thomas
- Color process: Technicolor
- Production company: Warner Bros. Cartoons
- Distributed by: Warner Bros. Pictures; The Vitaphone Corporation
- Release dates: October 30, 1954 (original release); July 19, 1969 (Blue Ribbon reissue)
- Running time: 6:30
- Country: United States
- Language: English

Quack Shot is a 1954 American animated comedy short film directed by Robert McKimson. The cartoon was released on October 30, 1954 as part of the Merrie Melodies series, and stars Daffy Duck and Elmer Fudd. Despite releasing in 1954, the short's copyright was in notice during 1953. (Note: Under RE0000081503)

== Plot ==
Elmer Fudd is duck hunting at a lake when he shoots a young duckling which falls into his boat. As Elmer examines it, Daffy Duck pops out of the water and grabs the duckling from Elmer. Daffy then bandages the duckling and places it into the lake. Daffy then warns Elmer "If you shoot one more duck, just one more duck, you'll be in trouble!!" Elmer then proceeds to shoot Daffy at point-blank range, which removes the feathers from Daffy's scalp, Daffy decides that it is time to declare war, and again as he jumps back in the lake, but not before Elmer shoots his rear end, removing his tail feathers. Daffy then uses various tricks to prevent Elmer's repeated attempts at hunting.

Daffy dons some diving gear and goes underwater, attempting to drill holes in Elmer's speedboat. However, he goes a little too far and he comes up with the leak, where he is shot by Elmer. Daffy sets the drill in reverse and goes down with the leak, but Elmer shoots into the hole and Daffy is shot again.

Daffy then uses a smoke maker that covers Elmer's boat, and Daffy swims over with a gas mask and mallet. But just when he is about to attack, Elmer reveals a fan that blows away part of the smoke cloud and shoots Daffy. Daffy then angrily says "Smartypants" before swimming away.

Daffy gets on a hot air balloon with a bomb to get above Elmer's boat. But after he lights it, the bomb instantly goes off before he can drop it on Elmer, blowing up the balloon and causing Daffy and the remains of the balloon to suffer from gravity.

While Elmer is making duck calls, Daffy, in a deep diving mask, drops a stick of dynamite into Elmer's boat. However, Elmer immediately puts it inside Daffy's mask and it detonates in Daffy's face.

Daffy launches a miniature toy battleship at Elmer's boat, its real guns shoot Elmer in the face after he retrieves the boat from the water.

Daffy attaches a duck decoy loaded with gunpowder and a fuse to Elmer's duck decoy string. Daffy's thumb gets stuck in the knot attached to Elmer's line however, he manages to untie himself, but the explosive decoy is still attached to his thumb and explodes as Daffy attempts to run from it. Luckily, Daffy manages to survive the explosion unharmed.

As Elmer pulls up at the dock, Daffy, with a pack of dynamite goes underneath a bucket, and places the dynamite next to Elmer. Elmer immediately notices and tries to muffle it with the bucket Daffy is in. The explosion occurs and Daffy dazedly crawls away under the bucket, leaving behind a trail of feathers.

Elmer proclaims that duck hunting is harder this season and decides to take a nap. While he is asleep, Daffy empties out the bullets from Elmer's gun, then wakes up Elmer. Elmer instead shoots him with another gun, and Daffy angrily tells him to use the emptied gun, but even so, the gun somehow has one bullet left inside, and he is shot again. Elmer ties him up with rope and sends him out into the lake on the boat, now filled with explosives. The boat heads out into the lake but then circles back toward the pier where Elmer is standing. As the boat returns toward the pier, Daffy manages to jump into the lake. The boat then explodes at the precise moment that it returns to the pier where Elmer is standing.

Elmer, wrapped in bandages, decides that he is going to try fishing instead. After he catches a miniature barracuda, a larger barracuda emerges from the lake, releases the smaller fish, and threatens Elmer "If you catch one more fish, just one more fish, you'll be in trouble!!", before swimming away. Daffy then emerges from underneath Elmer's hat and utters "Strong union" before happily hopping and woo-hooing away on the water.

== Home media ==
This short is available on the Looney Tunes Collector's Choice: Volume 4 Blu-ray.
