= Wideo Wabbit =

1956 film by Robert McKimson

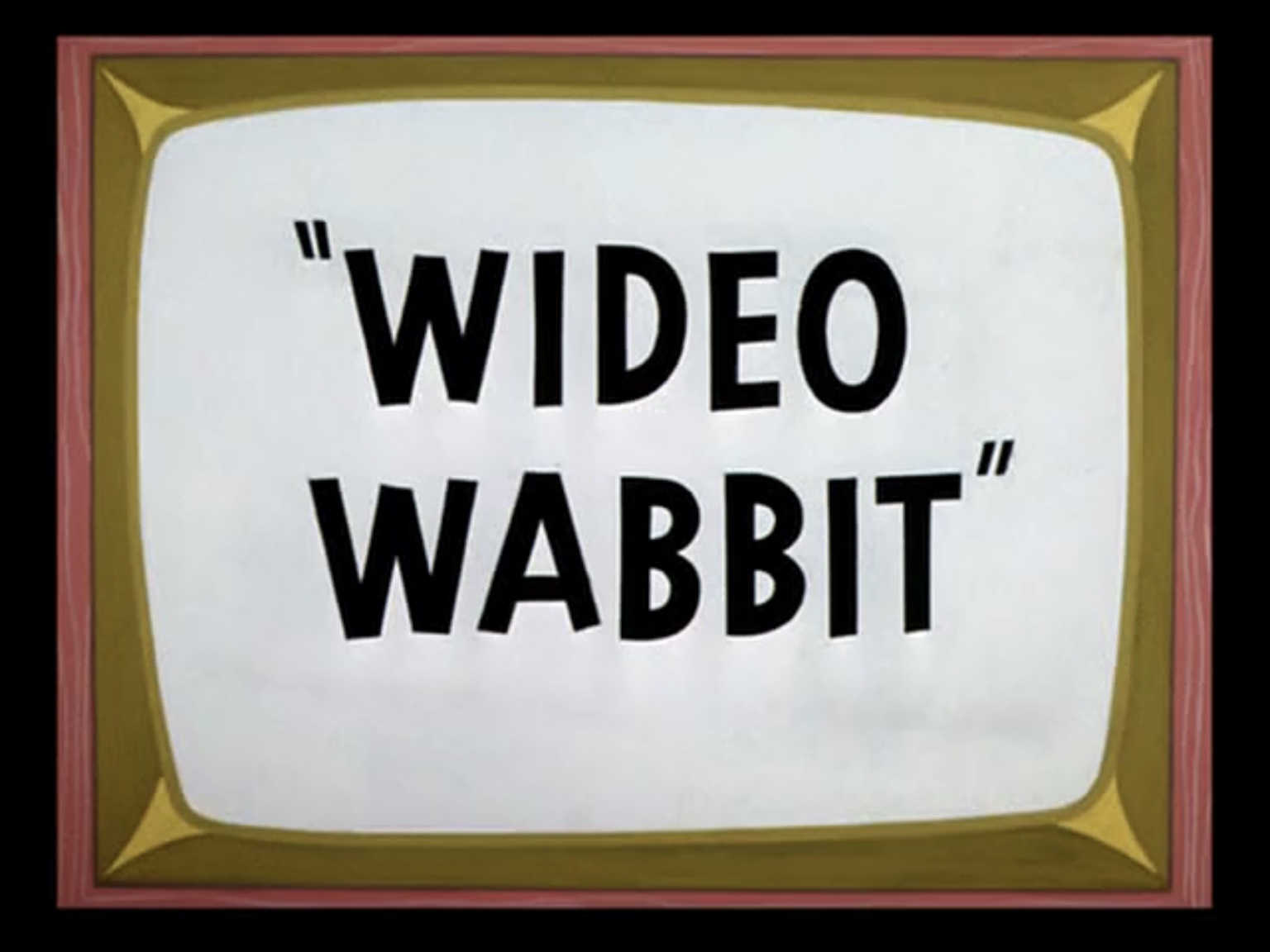
- Title card
- Directed by: Robert McKimson
- Story by: Tedd Pierce
- Starring: Mel Blanc; Arthur Q. Bryan; Daws Butler
- Edited by: Irvin Jay
- Music by: Carl Stalling
- Animation by: Ted Bonnicksen; Keith Darling; Russ Dyson; George Grandpré
- Layouts by: Robert Gribbroek
- Backgrounds by: Richard H. Thomas
- Color process: Technicolor
- Production company: Warner Bros. Cartoons
- Distributed by: Warner Bros. Pictures; The Vitaphone Corporation
- Release date: October 27, 1956
- Running time: 7:00
- Language: English

Wideo Wabbit is a 1956 Warner Bros. Merrie Melodies cartoon directed by Robert McKimson. The short was released on October 27, 1956, and stars Bugs Bunny and Elmer Fudd. In the film, Bugs volunteers for an appearance in a television show hosted by Elmer. He is unaware that this is a show about hunting techniques, and he volunteers to become a hunter's prey.

== Plot ==
Bugs Bunny is singing "This Is My Lucky Day" when he comes on an ad in the newspaper wanting a rabbit for a show at the QTTV-TV studio. When he gets there, the producer makes Bugs climb a ladder wired to a 10,000-volt fuse box. Unbeknownst to Bugs, it is a hunting show starring Elmer Fudd called The Sportsman's Hour, sponsored by The French Fried Fresh Frozen Rabbit Company. He teaches the audience about how to hunt a rabbit. He signals the cue for Bugs to come up out of the hole by pushing a button to activate the fuse box. When Bugs emerges, Elmer starts shooting. Bugs will not cooperate being shot at and Bugs takes this as professional jealousy, but on a scale he had never imagined. As Bugs leaves the studio with Elmer in pursuit, the producer frantically holds up a sign to the camera that says "Program Temporarily Interrupted. Please Stand By."

Elmer chases Bugs all over the studio. In the first room, Bugs does a show called You Beat Your Wife (a parody of You Bet Your Life), and Bugs dressed as Groucho Marx contests Elmer. As Bugs walks off, Elmer sees Bugs in disguise and Bugs kisses him. In the next room Elmer gets a cherry pie in his face for the show You're Asking For It (a parody of You Asked for It). In the following room, Bugs plays "Liver-ace" (a parody of Liberace), and when Elmer comes in, he is playing the piano. When Bugs sees Elmer, he shows piano keys like teeth, calls Elmer "his brother George", and tells Elmer to take the candelabra over to Mother. The candles are actually sticks of dynamite that blow up Elmer enough to burn his clothes. Bugs quoted as Liver-ace "I did it because I wanted my show to go off with a bang"!

While chasing Bugs out of the studio and looking for him, Elmer asks Bugs (who is dressed as a studio usher) if he has seen a rabbit go by. Bugs sends Elmer into a studio that is filming You Were There (a parody of You Are There) which was reenacting Custer's Last Stand. As Elmer comes out having been attacked by a posse of Indians, Bugs redirects Elmer to Studio C for The Medic. Elmer says "Oh, much obliged" as he is leaving with a tomahawk in the back of his head and three arrows in his back.

Elmer continues his search for Bugs stating that unless he finds "that wabbit", his career will be ruined. Finally, Bugs appears dressed as a producer and brings Elmer into a show called Fancy Dress Party (a parody of Masquerade Party), Elmer gets changed into a rabbit costume, and Bugs gets into Elmer's hunting outfit.

Bugs goes back on The Sportsman's Hour and shoots Elmer in his rabbit suit as Elmer gets furious. Bugs then comes in dressed as Ed Norton from The Honeymooners and gives Elmer a cigar with Groucho Marx's glasses and eyebrows while quoting "Hey, hey, hey! Take it easy. Have a cigar. Geez, what a Groucho!".

== Home media ==
Wideo Wabbit is available, uncut and restored, on Looney Tunes Golden Collection: Volume 3, Disc 2.

== See also ==
- People Are Bunny - A later cartoon that featured another You Are There parody.

Preceded by A Star Is Bored	Bugs Bunny Cartoons; 1956	Succeeded by To Hare Is Human
