= What's My Lion? =

- Directed by: Robert McKimson
- Story by: David Detiege
- Produced by: David H. DePatie; William Orcutt (both uncredited)
- Starring: Mel Blanc (all other voices); Hal Smith (Elmer Fudd)
- Narrated by: Herb Vigran
- Edited by: Treg Brown
- Music by: Milt Franklyn
- Animation by: Warren Batchelder; Ted Bonnicksen; George Grandpré; Keith Darling
- Layouts by: Robert Gribbroek
- Backgrounds by: William Butler
- Color process: Technicolor
- Production company: Warner Bros. Cartoons
- Distributed by: Warner Bros. Pictures; Vitaphone
- Release date: October 21, 1961
- Running time: 6 minutes
- Language: English

What's My Lion? is a 1961 Warner Bros. Looney Tunes theatrical cartoon directed by Robert McKimson and written by David Detiege. The short was released on October 21, 1961 and features Elmer Fudd. This is Elmer's final speaking appearance in the original theatrical Looney Tunes shorts; he appears in 1962's Crow's Feat but does not have any dialogue.

In the film, a mountain lion evades hunters by hiding in the house of Elmer. The premise for What's My Lion? is very similar to an earlier Oscar-nominated Disney cartoon called Rugged Bear (1953), also written by David Detiege. The title is a play on the game show What's My Line?

== Plot summary ==
A mountain lion (Rocky) is proudly sitting on his throne, but gets nervous when he realizes that hunting season has begun. He narrowly escapes gunfire as he runs into a town and breaks into a house. The house is owned by Elmer Fudd, who has returned from hunting. Rocky pokes his head into an empty slot for stuffed heads and pretends to be dead, but that proves difficult when tickled by a fly, sprayed with bug spray by Fudd, and is nearly hit by clumsily thrown darts by Fudd. When Fudd goes into the kitchen to fix his lunch, Rocky makes a break for it by putting on a cloak and running outside, but the hunters still shoot at him, so Rocky runs back to his hiding place in Fudd's house.

Meanwhile, Fudd prepares a steak with numerous hot spices and a pot of boiling hot coffee, but sets them on the table when he realizes he forgot the bread. Rocky leaves the stuffed head slot to eat the steak (unaware it is coated with hot sauce), and when he tries to wash it down with the drink, he gets even hotter and blows fire, screaming. Going back to his hiding spot, Fudd wonders what happened to his steak, but is interrupted by a phone call saying that hunting season is cancelled and that he has to take the hunting signs down. Upon hearing this, Rocky leaves his stuffed head slot and runs outside. Other animals, apparently not dead, leave their slots as well. Fudd explains to the audience that he set a new record this year for quickest time that the animals ran out on him, and does his trademark laugh as the short ends.

== See also ==
- List of cartoons featuring Elmer Fudd
