= Bread and butter (superstition) =

Superstitious practice related to physical separation

"Bread and butter" is a superstitious blessing or charm, typically said by young couples or friends walking together when they are forced to separate by an obstacle, such as a pole or another person. By saying the phrase, the bad luck of letting something come between them is thought to be averted. Both walkers must say the phrase, and if they do not do this, then a bitter quarrel is expected to occur. The concept derives from the difficulty of separating butter from bread once it has been spread – buttered bread cannot be "unbuttered". Another phrase used in this way is "salt and pepper".

== In popular culture ==
The phrase is occasionally heard in mid-20th century Warner Bros. cartoons where two characters pass close to each other.
