= List of Toon In with Me episodes (2024) =

This is a list of episodes of the American live-action/animated anthology comedy television series Toon In with Me that aired on MeTV in 2024.

== Episodes ==
No. overall	No. in year	Title	Original release date
666	1	"Bill in the New Year"	January 3, 2024
New Year, New Bill! Bill works through his New Year's resolutions with the help of Toony and fitness expert, Saran Dunmore. Featured cartoons: 14 Carrot Rabbit (1952), Cat's Paw (1959), Innertube Antics (1944), Porky the Wrestler (1937), Private Eye Pooch (1955)
667	2	"Toony Goes to Healthy"	January 4, 2024
Bill encourages Toony to eat healthier with the help of Chef Lala. Featured cartoons: Daffy's Inn Trouble (1961), Easy Peckin's (1953), Fodder and Son (1957), The Uninvited Pest (1943), The Last Hungry Cat (1961)
668	3	"New Year Debuts"	January 5, 2024
Toony's on vacation and Bill hosts solo, or does he? Featured cartoons: Wet Blanket Policy (1948), The Farmer and the Belle (1950), The Timid Toreador (1940), Plenty of Money and You (1937), Sliphorn King of Polaroo (1945), Jerry and the Lion (1950)
669	4	"Best of Teddy"	January 9, 2024
Bill and Toony donate items to the Teddy Roosevelt museum. Featured cartoons: Odor-able Kitty (1945), Spinach Packin' Popeye (1944), The Impossible Possum (1954), The Snoozin' Bruin (1971), Mouse-Taken Identity (1957)
670	5	"Cold and Flu Boo Hoo!"	January 10, 2024
Toony digs up supposed cures for the common cold when Bill stays home sick. Featured cartoons: Odor of the Day (1948), Chilly's Ice Folly (1970), The Sneezing Weasel (1938), Buddies Thicker Than Water (1962), Hare Force (1944)
671	6	"Sgt. Toony's Lonely Hurt Bill Camp"	January 11, 2024
Toony gets a little too into the drill sergeant spirit when Bill shows military-themed cartoons. Featured cartoons: Rookie Revue (1941), Drafty, Isn't It? (1957), Flying Circus (1968), Many Tanks (1942), The Weakly Reporter (1944)
672	7	"Winter to the Extreme!"	January 12, 2024
Toony makes Bill try wild and crazy winter sports like shovel racing and… "Billsledding"? Featured cartoons: Greedy for Tweety (1957), Cracked Ice (1938), I'll Be Skiing Ya (1947), Ski Napper (1964), Mice Follies (1954)
673	8	"Impressions!"	January 16, 2024
Bill shows cartoon spoofs of celebrities, while Toony does a mysterious celeb impression. Featured cartoons: Good Noose (1962), Dog Daze (1937), The Hick Chick (1946), Robin Hoody Woody (1963), Fistic Mystic (1969), The Unmentionables (1963)
674	9	"Time Capsule Trivia Hour"	January 17, 2024
Bill and Toony cheer up Mr. Quizzer by showing lost Time Capsule Trivia footage. Featured cartoons: Bedtime Bedlam (1955), Feather Finger (1966), Fox-Terror (1957), Wee-Willie Wildcat (1953), Baby Butch (1954)
675	10	"1974 Galore"	January 18, 2024
Bill takes a dreamy look back through the year 1974. Featured cartoons: Sugar and Spies (1966), Hassle in a Castle (1966), Prehistoric Porky (1940), Feline Frame-Up (1954), A Kiddies Kitty (1955)
676	11	"Off to the Mountains!"	January 19, 2024
Bill and Toony take an adventurous winter vacation to the Swiss Alps. Featured cartoons: What's My Lion? (1961), The Bear and the Beavers (1942), Little Cesario (1941), Sh-h-h-h-h-h (1955), Mouse Mazurka (1949)
677	12	"Mel Attonin's Masterworks"	January 22, 2024
Bill aspires to be an artist, while looking at the best of Mel Attonin. Featured cartoons: The Painter and the Pointer (1944), Scent-imental Romeo (1951), Clippety Clobbered (1966), Arts and Flowers (1956), The Big Snooze (1946)
678	13	"Horsin' Around"	January 24, 2024
Stick around! Because Bill has joined the latest craze - hobby horses. Featured cartoons: Posse Cat (1954), Hay Rube (1954), Hobby Horse-Laffs (1942), Be Kind to 'Aminals' (1935), Buckaroo Bugs (1944)
679	14	"Gone Ice Fishin'"	January 25, 2024
Bill teaches Toony the joys of sitting on a frozen lake with friends, but overlooks one key element. Featured cartoons: Weasel While You Work (1958), The Fishing Bear (1940), St. Moritz Blitz (1961), Mixed Master (1956), 8 Ball Bunny (1950)
680	15	"Be Prepared"	January 26, 2024
Bill has a nightmare that leaves him paranoid about the end of days, so he starts putting together an emergency survival kit and gets a lesson in self-defense. Featured cartoons: Purr-Chance to Dream (1967), I'm in the Army Now (1936), The Blow Out (1936), Gopher Goofy (1942), Hare Brush (1955)
681	16	"Prepare for Take Off"	January 30, 2024
Bill and Toony board an old Cleam Jet to relive the Golden Age of air travel. Featured cartoons: The Jet Cage (1962), Pest Pilot (1941), The Air Hostess (1937), Bartholomew Versus the Wheel (1964), Ace in the Hole (1942)
682	17	"Hey! It's 1984!"	January 31, 2024
Bill and Toony battle to see who knows more about 1984. The year, not the book. Featured cartoons: Gorilla My Dreams (1948), Woodpecker in the Moon (1959), Highway Runnery (1965), People Are Bunny (1959), Puppy Tale (1954)
683	18	"Black History Innovators"	February 1, 2024
It's Black History Month. Bill and Toony spotlight a few of the most notable black inventors and innovations. Featured cartoons: Designs on Jerry (1955), What's Peckin' (1965), The Flying Bear (1941), Robot Rabbit (1953)
684	19	"Pocket Mail"	February 5, 2024
Bill and Toony answer viewer mail that was found in Bill's hoodie pockets. Featured cartoons: Foxy by Proxy (1952), Porky and Teabiscuit (1939), A Gruesome Twosome (1945), Nutty Pine Cabin (1942), Fine Feathered Friend (1942)
685	20	"Shock and Awesome"	February 6, 2024
Simon Shock has a new cohost, Toony the Tuna? What could possibly go wrong? Featured cartoons: Daffy Dilly (1948), Poop Deck Pirate (1961), Tot Watchers (1958), Tweet and Lovely (1959), No Parking Hare (1954)
686	21	"Black History in Animation"	February 7, 2024
The Black History Month celebration continues; highlighting key African American players in animation history. Featured cartoons: Deduce, You Say! (1956), A Great Big Bunch of You (1932), D' Fightin' Ones (1961), It's Hummer Time (1950), The Night of the Living Duck (1988)
687	22	"Plenty of Fish in the Sea"	February 8, 2024
When Bill sees how bad Toony's online dating profile is, he calls in an expert to help. Featured cartoons: Don't Axe Me (1958), Belle Boys (1953), A Clean Shaven Man (1936), The Gay Anties (1947), Blue Cat Blues (1956)
688	23	"National Pizza Day"	February 9, 2024
A celebration of National Pizza Day including games, one of America's top chefs and lots of pizza. Featured cartoons: Neapolitan Mouse (1954), Dough Ray Me-ow (1948), I'll Never Crow Again (1941), For the Love of Pizza (1972), A Pizza Tweety-Pie (1958)
689	24	"Black History in Music"	February 12, 2024
Exploring the history of African Americans in music with jazz musician Bethany Pickens. Featured cartoons: One Froggy Evening (1955), The Pied Piper of Basin Street (1945), Solid Serenade (1946), The Hep Cat (1942), Three Little Bops (1957)
690	25	"Fat Tuesday"	February 13, 2024
Let the good times roll! Toony and Bill celebrate Mardi Gras -- with beignets, naturally. Featured cartoons: Really Scent (1959), Sock-a-Bye, Baby (1934), French Rarebit (1951), Southern Fried Hospitality (1960), Dog Gone South (1950)
691	26	"Valentine Pals"	February 14, 2024
Bill, Toony and Mr. Quizzer prove they have a lot of heart, candy hearts. Featured cartoons: Don't Look Now (1936), Tom and Chérie (1955), Little Beau Pepé (1952), Bear and the Bees (1961), The Stupid Cupid (1944)
692	27	"Manners Matter"	February 15, 2024
Toony calls an etiquette coach to help Bill with his bad manners. Featured cartoons: Bill of Hare (1962), Birds of a Father (1961), Meatless Flyday (1944), The Rude Intruder (1972), Tick Tock Tuckered (1944)
693	28	"Making Waves"	February 16, 2024
Bill goes stir-crazy from being cooped up all winter, so Toony suggests planning a vacation. Featured cartoons: Down and Outing (1961), Sniffles Takes a Trip (1940), Coo Coo Nuts (1970), Canned Feud (1951), Go Away Stowaway (1967)
694	29	"All About the Benjamin"	February 19, 2024
Teddy Roosevelt is not thrilled when Bill dresses up as frenemy Benjamin Harrison on Presidents' Day. Featured cartoons: A Fractured Leghorn (1950), Olive Oyl for President (1948), Ant Pasted (1953), Billion Dollar Boner (1960), Ballot Box Bunny (1951)
695	30	"Black History in TV & Film"	February 21, 2024
Filmmaker Ayoka Chenzira joins Bill and Toony's celebration honoring the achievements of African Americans in TV and film. Featured cartoons: Room and Bored (1962), Carmen Get It! (1962), Rooftop Razzle Dazzle (1964), To Itch His Own (1958), The Million Hare (1963)
696	31	"Parks & Record"	February 22, 2024
Bill and Toony are hitting some of the lesser-known National Parks. Featured cartoons: The Big Snooze (1957), Cross Country Detours (1940), Hunger Strife (1960), Everglade Raid (1958), Hare Trigger (1945)
697	32	"Through a Fish's Eye"	February 23, 2024
Bill and Toony have an out-of-body experience. Featured cartoons: Hair-Raising Hare (1946), Baby Puss (1943), Little Red Rodent Hood (1952), The Bird Who Came to Dinner (1961), His Bitter Half (1950)
698	33	"Very Superstitious"	February 27, 2024
Bill doesn't believe in superstitions... or does he? Featured cartoons: Lotsa Luck (1968), Bad Luck Blackie (1949), I Don't Scare (1956), Mouse Trapped (1959), Bowery Bugs (1949)
699	34	"First Things First: Black History"	February 28, 2024
Bill teaches Toony some notable firsts in Black History. Featured cartoons: Chilly Willy (1953), Love That Pup (1949), Beware of Barnacle Bill (1935), The Beach Nut (1944), Bunker Hill Bunny (1950)
700	35	"Leap Day"	February 29, 2024
It's Toon In with Me's very first leap day. What will Bill and Toony do with all this extra time? Featured cartoons: Beep, Beep (1952), Roamin' Roman (1964), Happy Birthdaze (1943), Rabbit of Seville (1950), Museum Scream (2003)
701	36	"Bill and Toony Make a Sitcom"	March 1, 2024
When Toony wants a sitcom of his own, Bill tries to recreate the classics of the '50s and '70s. Featured cartoons: Tom-ic Energy (1965), The Honey-Mousers (1956), It's Nice to Have a Mouse Around the House (1965), Rain, Rain Go Away (1972), The Hasty Hare (1952)
702	37	"Did You Know?"	March 4, 2024
Bill shares a variety of random fun facts. Featured cartoons: Sahara Hare (1955), Mouse Trouble (1944), Porky's Hotel (1939), Cock-A-Doodle-Duel (2004), Busman's Holiday (1961), Aqua Duck (1963)
703	38	"Accidental Genius"	March 5, 2024
Bill thinks he accidentally discovered some peculiar inventions. Featured cartoons: Operation: Rabbit (1952), The House of Tomorrow (1949), The Hole Idea (1955), Betty Boop and Grampy (1935), Franken-Stymied (1961)
704	39	"Women in Animation"	March 6, 2024
Bill and Toony highlight pioneer women in the field of animation. Featured cartoons: A Bird in a Bonnet (1958), Calling Dr. Woodpecker (1963), We Did It (1936), Love Me, Love My Mouse (1966), An Egg Scramble (1950)
705	40	"Bill & Toony Start a Podcast"	March 7, 2024
Toony and Bill have a podcast. Maybe. All they need is a title. And something to talk about. Featured cartoons: The Missing Mouse (1953), Porky's Baseball Broadcast (1940), Mexican Cat Dance (1963), Let's Stalk Spinach (1951), Knock Knock (1940)
706	41	"A Tour of 1994"	March 8, 2024
Bill rolls the pop-culture clock back 30 years to the era when... he had a Rachael cut?? Featured cartoons: To Hare Is Human (1956), Norman Normal (1968), Fractured Friendship (1965), What's Opera, Doc? (1957), Smarty Cat (1955)
707	42	"On Broadway"	March 11, 2024
It's showtime! Bill and Toony have their sights set on Broadway. Featured cartoons: What's Up, Doc? (1950), The Cat Above and the Mouse Below (1964), A Witch's Tangled Hare (1959), A Fish Story (1972), Rodent to Stardom (1967)
708	43	"Sock Hop to It"	March 13, 2024
It's a sock-tastic day when Bill forgets his shoes at home. Featured cartoons: Who's Kitten Who? (1952), Real Gone Woody (1954), Mouse-Warming (1952), Child Sockology (1953), Zipping Along (1953)
709	44	"Do the Math"	March 14, 2024
It's Pi Day. Bill signs up for a trial that makes him a super genius... or something like that. Featured cartoons: Feather Dusted (1955), Riff Raffy Daffy (1948), Prehistoric Super Salesman (1969), Bird-Brain Bird Dog (1954), Freudy Cat (1964)
710	45	"All of Our Toons"	March 18, 2024
Bill and Toony make a very dramatic soap opera. Featured cartoons: The Scarlet Pumpernickel (1950), Mouse-Placed Kitten (1959), No! No! A Thousand Times No!! (1935), Woody's Kook-out (1961), Catch as Cats Can (1947)
711	46	"Spring Has Sprung!"	March 19, 2024
Bill and Toony celebrate the first day of spring. Featured cartoons: The Music Mice-Tro (1967), Porky's Spring Planting (1938), Goose in the Rough (1963), Pop Goes Your Heart (1934), Rabbit Seasoning (1952)
712	47	"Wisc'd Away"	March 20, 2024
Bill and Toony head to Wisconsin for a "dairy good time". Chef Alisha Elenz of Bravo's "Top Chef" Season 21 in studio. Featured cartoons: Fowl Weather (1953), The Farm of Tomorrow (1954), Hot Diggity Dog (1967), How Green Is My Spinach (1950), O-Solar Meow (1967)
713	48	"The T.I.W.M."	March 21, 2024
Bill auditions for the newest teen drama. Featured cartoons: Busy Buddies (1956), I Was a Teenage Thumb (1963), The Slick Chick (1962), Rah Rah Ruckus (1964), Baby Buggy Bunny (1954)
714	49	"Cartoon Mashup"	March 25, 2024
Forget about March Madness, we're hittin' the cartoon brackets. Featured cartoons: Hare Do (1949), A Squeak in the Deep (1966), Catty-Cornered (1966), Trick or Tweet (1959), Helter Shelter (1955), The Wild Chase (1965)
715	50	"Toonaween"	March 26, 2024
Bill and Toony honor the official holiday celebration of cartoons. Featured cartoons: What Makes Daffy Duck (1948), Scrambled Aches (1957), Punch Trunk (1953), Wild Wild World (1960), Robin Hoodwinked (1958)
716	51	"Survival a la Mode"	March 27, 2024
Bill and Toony learn outdoor survival skills from a true brushcraft expert. Featured cartoons: Tweet Tweet Tweety (1951), Porky in the North Woods (1936), Suppressed Duck (1965), How to Trap a Woodpecker (1971), Backwoods Bunny (1959)
717	52	"Girl Group Greats"	March 28, 2024
Bill and Toony explore the history of girl bands with a special guest. Featured cartoons: Wet Hare (1962), Swallow the Leader (1949), Go Go Amigo (1965), Let's Get Movin' (1936), Wild and Woolfy (1945)
718	53	"Easter Party"	March 29, 2024
It's a pre-Easter celebration at Toon in with Me. Featured cartoons: Easter Yeggs (1947), Holiday Highlights (1940), Goose is Wild (1963), The Egg Cracker Suite (1943), Happy Go Ducky (1958)
719	54	"April Fools!"	April 1, 2024
It's April Fools and you've been Tanked. Featured cartoons: Bedevilled Rabbit (1957), Happy-Go-Nutty (1944), The Nautical Nut (1967), Bad Day at Cat Rock (1965), Hare Tonic (1945)
720	55	"History of Talk Shows"	April 2, 2024
Bill and Toony get front frow seats to Mr. Quizzer's new talk show. Featured cartoons: Fish and Slips (1962), High Diving Hare (1949), Guest Who? (1965), Banty Raids (1963), Person to Bunny (1960)
721	56	"It's 64!"	April 4, 2024
Bill and Toony revisit the pop culture highlights of 1964. Featured cartoons: Nuts and Volts (1964), War and Pieces (1964), Rock-a-Bye Bear (1952), Touché, Pussy Cat! (1954), Dumb Patrol (1964)
722	57	"Truckin' Toony"	April 5, 2024
Toony and Bill hit the road in a big rig, as Bill reminisces about the trucking craze of the 1970s. Featured cartoons: Going! Going! Gosh! (1952), I Gopher You (1954), The Loose Nut (1945), Highway Hecklers (1968), Jerry and Jumbo (1953)
723	58	"Spring Cleaning"	April 8, 2024
Bill courageously decides to clean Toony's tank. Featured cartoons: Slicked-up Pup (1951), The Bee-Deviled Bruin (1949), Window Pains (1967), The Lyin' Mouse (1937), Shanghai Woody (1971), Fin'n Catty (1943)
724	59	"Game Show Time"	April 9, 2024
Bill & Toony explore the history of game shows with a special guest. Featured cartoons: The Ducksters (1950), Cannery Rodent (1967), Watch the Birdie (1958), A Job for a Gob (1955), Early to Bet (1951)
725	60	"Natural Wonders"	April 11, 2024
Bill and Toony head West to see some of America's natural wonders. Featured cartoons: Ali Baba Bunny (1957), Pre-Hysterical Man (1948), Satan's Waitin' (1954), The Tree Surgeon (1944), Hip Hip-Hurry! (1958)
726	61	"Time for Recess"	April 12, 2024
Oh butterscotch, Bill accidentally challenges Teddy Roosevelt to a hopscotch battle. Featured cartoons: Matinee Mouse (1966), Bye, Bye, Blackboard (1972), Bell Hoppy (1954), Chips Off the Old Block (1942), Hare Lift (1952)
727	62	"Tabloid Toony"	April 16, 2024
"Cleam Monthly" magazine honors the incredible life of Toony. Featured cartoons: Panhandle Scandal (1959), Tots of Fun (1952), Rabbit Transit (1947), Cobs and Robbers (1953), The Slap-Hoppy Mouse (1956)
728	63	"Voices Behind the Toons"	April 17, 2024
Bill and Toony celebrate the voice actors behind your favorite cartoon characters. Featured cartoons: Bugs Bunny Gets the Boid (1942), Dog Gone People (1960), Woodpecker in the Rough (1952), Trip for Tat (1960), Superior Duck (1996)
729	64	"Toon Cruise"	April 18, 2024
Ship ahoy! Bill and Toony enjoy a luxury cruise, waterslides and all. Featured cartoons: Cruise Cat (1952), Who Scent You? (1960), Mutiny Ain't Nice (1938), A Chilly Reception (1958), Mutiny on the Bunny (1950)
730	65	"The Detectives"	April 19, 2024
When Diver Guy goes missing, Detectives Tank and Clicker are on the case. Featured cartoons: Rocket Squad (1956), Choose Your 'Weppins' (1935), Convict Concerto (1954), Who Killed Who? (1943), The Super Snooper (1952)
731	66	"Happy Earth Day!"	April 22, 2024
Bill and Toony are all about that reduce, reuse, recycle lifestyle. Featured cartoons: Cats and Bruises (1965), Peck of Trouble (1968), The Mouse and the Lion (1953), Porky Chops (1949), Bonanza Bunny (1959)
732	67	"1954 Was Red Hot!"	April 24, 2024
Bill dials the clock back to '54 when rock was rollin' and Atomic Fireballs were the new hot thing. Featured cartoons: My Little Duckaroo (1954), Little Boy Boo (1954), No Barking (1954), Wild Wife (1954), A Horses Tale (1954)
733	68	"Sweet Home Alabama"	April 25, 2024
Bill and Toony embrace Alabama's rich landmarks; including a common tradition that doesn't sit quite well with Toony. Featured cartoons: Home Sweet Homewrecker (1962), The Football Toucher Downer (1937), Mutts About Racing (1958), Fresh Fish (1939), Stupor Duck (1956)
734	69	"North Carolina in My Mind"	April 29, 2024
Bill and Toony tour the great state of North Carolina, where Michael Jordan was not born. Featured cartoons: Honey's Money (1962), The Shell Shocked Egg (1948), Just Plane Beep (1965), Gopher Broke (1958), Woody's Clip Joint (1964)
735	70	"Don't Get Scammed"	April 30, 2024
Bill and Toony avoid becoming the victims of a scam with the help of a special guest. Featured cartoons: Fool Coverage (1952), At Your Service Madame (1936), Barbary Coast Bunny (1956), Show Biz Beagle (1972), Daffy's Diner (1967)
736	71	"Derby Day"	May 3, 2024
Bill and Toony are off to the races to celebrate the derby lifestyle with a few special guests. Featured cartoons: Bugs Bunny Rides Again (1948), Porky's Prize Pony (1941), Be Kind to 'Aminals' (1935), Half-Pint Palomino (1953), Phoney Pony (1969)
737	72	"We've Got Mail!"	May 7, 2024
Bill and Toony answer questions, read viewer comments and show cartoons all requested by our amazing tooners. Featured cartoons: Lickety-Splat (1961), Imagination (1943), Little Nobody (1935), Farm Frolics (1941), Freeway Fracas (1964)
738	73	"Hipstery"	May 8, 2024
Bill shows Toony the evolution of the hipster, you dig? Featured cartoons: From Hand to Mouse (1944), Rock 'n' Rodent (1967), Corny Concerto (1962), Woody's Magic Touch (1971), Swing Ding Amigo (1966)
739	74	"Bill & Toony Work a Party"	May 9, 2024
Bill learns balloon twisting skills from a true master. Featured cartoons: Popeye's Mirthday (1953), Little Runaway (1952), Fastest with the Mostest (1960), The Goofy Gardener (1957), Hare-Less Wolf (1958)
740	75	"For the Love of Mom"	May 10, 2024
Bill and Toony celebrate Mother's Day with the help of a special guest. Featured cartoons: Apes of Wrath (1959), That's My Mommy (1955), Baby Bottleneck (1946), Chilly and The Woodchopper (1967), Red Riding Hoodwinked (1955)
741	76	"Let's Bike to Work"	May 13, 2024
Bill and Toony celebrate bike to work week. Featured cartoons: Boobs in the Woods (1950), Hospitaliky (1937), Clippety Clobbered (1966), The Dover Boys (1942), What's Sweepin' (1953)
742	77	"Sneaker Peaks"	May 15, 2024
Bill and Toony look back at the history of sneakers, from Chucks to Pumps. Featured cartoons: Haredevil Hare (1948), Mackerel Moocher (1962), Never Kick a Woman (1936), Dig That Dog (1954), Fast and Furry-ous (1949)
743	78	"Fools of the Road"	May 16, 2024
Bill teaches Toony the rules of the road so he can get his driver's license. Featured cartoons: Birdy and the Beast (1944), So Does an Automobile (1939), The Solid Tin Coyote (1966), Wacky-bye Baby (1948), The Wacky Wabbit (1942)
744	79	"Yachts Rock"	May 17, 2024
All aboard Bill's new boat, 'Toast to Coast'. Featured cartoons: Tugboat Granny (1956), Operation Shanghai (1967), My Pop, My Pop (1940), Dicky Moe (1962), Touché and Go (1957)
745	80	"Bill’s Big Book of Cartoon Facts"	May 20, 2024
Bill lands his first ever book deal... about facts, naturally. Featured cartoons: I Taw a Putty Tat (1948), What's Buzzin' Buzzard? (1943), The Arctic Giant (1942), I'm Cold (1954), Knighty Knight Bugs (1958)
746	81	"Bill Toons It Out"	May 21, 2024
Bill attempts to indulge in some mindful relaxation techniques despite Toony's constant interruptions. Featured cartoons: A Pest in the House (1947), Swat the Fly (1935), Project Reject (1969), Tops With Pops (1957), Hi-Rise Wise Guys (1970)
747	82	"Animated Toys"	May 22, 2024
Bill and Toony take a look at animated TV series that were inspired by toys. Featured cartoons: Bugs Bunny and the Three Bears (1944), Toy Town Hall (1936), The Bungling Builder (1971), Along Came Daffy (1947), Acrobatty Bunny (1946)
748	83	"The Hoosier State"	May 23, 2024
Bill and Toony tour Indiana, from French Lick to the pit lane. Featured cartoons: There They Go-Go-Go! (1956), Double-Cross-Country Race (1951), Robot Rabbit (1953), Socko in Morocco (1954), Daffy Duck Hunt (1949)
749	84	"Childhood Classics"	May 28, 2024
Bill teaches Toony about the classic children's TV we watched in our youth, from Kukla to Captain Kangaroo to The Electric Company. Featured cartoons: Mouse-Taken Identity (1957), Not Now (1936), Shot and Bothered (1966), Kitty from the City (1971), Case of the Missing Hare (1942)
750	85	"Gold Rush"	May 29, 2024
Bill takes his quest for gold a bit too seriously. Featured cartoons: 14 Carrot Rabbit (1952), Gold Diggin' Woodpecker (1972), Gold Rush Daze (1939), Stealin Aint Honest (1940), Deputy Droopy (1955)
751	86	"The Evergreen State"	May 30, 2024
Bill and Toony tour the only U.S. state named after a president. Featured cartoons: Hillbilly Hare (1950), Porky's Poppa (1938), Apple Andy (1946), Puss 'n' Boats (1966), Wild and Woolly Hare (1959)
752	87	"Lookalike-ish"	May 31, 2024
Ever been told you look just like a celebrity? It happens to Bill, Toony and Quizzer, too. Featured cartoons: Tortoise Beats Hare (1941), Tree for Two (1952), Cat Feud (1958), International Woodpecker (1957), Two Scent's Worth (1955)
753	88	"Wild About Weather"	June 4, 2024
What's the forecast? Bill will explain with the help of an actual meteorologist. Featured cartoons: Freeze Frame (1979), Bee Bopped (1959), Fiesta Fiasco (1967), Smitten Kitten (1952), Cool It Charlie (1969)
754	89	"The Lone Star State"	June 5, 2024
Is everything bigger in Texas? Bill and Toony will find out on the next stop of their "Trekkin' All 50" tour. Featured cartoons: Oily Hare (1952), Texas Tom (1950), The First Bad Man (1955), Tar with a Star (1949), Hot Rod Huckster (1954)
755	90	"Toony's Really Really Late Show"	June 6, 2024
Toony hosts his own late-night talk show, as sidekick Bill fills him on the history of the format. Featured cartoons: Knights Must Fall (1949), The Coo Coo Bird (1947), Doggone Tired (1949), Paw's Night Out (1955), Zip 'N Snort (1961)
756	91	"Yearbook Day"	June 7, 2024
It's picture day; the first ever yearbook features quite a few familiar faces. Featured cartoons: The Up-Standing Sitter (1948), Born to Peck (1952), Lunch with a Punch (1952), Porky's Hare Hunt (1938), Just Ducky (1953)
757	92	"The Garden State"	June 11, 2024
Bill and Toony's "Trekkin' All 50" tour leads them to the most densely populated state in America, New Jersey. Featured cartoons: 8 Ball Bunny (1950), The Beach Nut (1944), Lighthouse Keeping Blues (1964), Swooner Crooner (1944), Baseball Bugs (1946)
758	93	"Thanks Dad!"	June 14, 2024
Bill and Toony celebrate Father's Day. Featured cartoons: Backwoods Bunny (1959), A Bear for Punishment (1951), The Bongo Punch (1957), Nasty Quacks (1945), Cat's Paw (1959)
759	94	"Abandoned"	June 17, 2024
Bill and Toony take a mysterious vacation. Featured cartoons: Dime to Retire (1955), Phantom of the Horse Opera (1961), Lighthouse Mouse (1955), Coming Out Party (1963), Water, Water Every Hare (1952)
760	95	"Toony Is a Racecar Driver"	June 18, 2024
Toony's need for speed lands him an exciting racing opportunity. Professional racing driver Ryan Preece joins to help him prepare. Featured cartoons: Run, Run, Sweet Road Runner (1965), Maw and Paw (1953), Porky's Railroad (1937), Jerry-Go-Round (1966), The Grey Hounded Hare (1949)
761	96	"All That Taz"	June 19, 2024
Bill and Toony celebrate the Tasmanian Devil's 70th birthday. Featured cartoons: Devil May Hare (1954), Bedevilled Rabbit (1957), Ducking the Devil (1957), Bill of Hare (1962), Dr. Devil and Mr. Hare (1964)
762	97	"Beck's Best"	June 20, 2024
Cartoon historian and friend of the show, Jerry Beck, picks some of his favorite cartoons of all time. Featured cartoons: A Corny Concerto (1943), Rabbit of Seville (1950), One Froggy Evening (1955), Duck Amuck (1953), What's Opera, Doc? (1957)
763	98	"On This Day... June 25th"	June 25, 2024
Bill and Toony travel through June 25th history, and get visited by the creator of the show. Featured cartoons: Tweetie Pie (1947), Crockett-Doodle-Do (1960), Lumber Jerks (1955), Tick Tock Tuckered (1944), Long-Haired Hare (1949); Special Guest Appearance: Neal Sabin as himself.
764	99	"Child Stars"	June 28, 2024
Bill and Toony talk child stars. Featured cartoons: Golden Yeggs (1950), Cats A-Weigh! (1953), The Abominable Snow Rabbit (1961), On With the New (1938), A Bird in a Bonnet (1958)
765	100	"The Volunteer State"	July 2, 2024
Bill and Toony visit some of Tennessee's most popular attractions on the next stop of their "Trekkin' All 50" tour. Featured cartoons: Chilly's Hide-A-Way (1971), Porky's Pastry Pirates (1942), Thrill of Fair (1951), Nelly's Folly (1961), High Steaks (1962)
766	101	"Mandela Effect"	July 3, 2024
Bill and Toony explore curious examples of popular false memories, from Fruit of the Loom's phantom cornucopia to Ed McMahon's missing checks. Featured cartoons: Big House Bunny (1950), Of Feline Bondage (1965), Have Gun - Can't Travel (1967), Thumb Fun (1952), The Foghorn Leghorn (1948)
767	102	"Cartoon Villains"	July 9, 2024
Bill and Toony celebrate cartoon baddies. Featured cartoons: Rabbit Rampage (1955), Those Were Wonderful Days (1934), Cool Cat (1967), The Spinach Roadster (1936), Grin and Share It (1957)
768	103	"Breaking Bill"	July 12, 2024
This is a big year for breakdancing, but will Bill survive the celebration in one piece. Featured cartoons: Homeless Hare (1950), Sheep Wrecked (1958), Let's Celebrake (1938), Gopher Broke (1969), Daffy Duck Slept Here (1948)
769	104	"Life's a Beach"	July 16, 2024
Bill and Toony have a beachside escape. Featured cartoons: Salt Water Tabby (1947), Moby Duck (1965), Beach Peach (1950), Fair Weather Fiends (1946), Sandy Claws (1955)
770	105	"Summer Fit"	July 18, 2024
Bill and Toony get their summer bods ready with the help of a few guests. Featured cartoons: Jack-Wabbit and the Beanstalk (1943), Hook, Line and Stinker (1958), Betty Boop and Little Jimmy (1936), Muscle Tussle (1953), Jerry's Cousin (1951)
771	106	"Bingo Bill"	July 19, 2024
Tooners, join Bill and Toony for a game of B-I-N-G-O. Featured cartoons: Hare Remover (1946), Little Buck Cheeser (1937), Dog Tales (1958), Round Trip to Mars (1957), Past Perfumance (1955)
772	107	"Happy Birthday, Marvin!"	July 24, 2024
Bill and Toony celebrate Marvin the Martian's Birthday. Featured cartoons: Haredevil Hare (1948), The Hasty Hare (1952), Duck Dodgers in the 24½th Century (1953), Duck Dodgers and the Return of the 24½th Century (1980), Mad as a Mars Hare (1963)
773	108	"Teen Idols"	July 25, 2024
Bill and Toony spotlight iconic teen sensations. Featured cartoons: Bewitched Bunny (1954), Fast Buck Duck (1963), The Mad Hatter (1948), Who Scent You? (1960), Hollywood Daffy (1946)
774	109	"Summer Games"	July 26, 2024
Bill and Toony discuss the evolution of the Summer Olympic Games with a 4-time Olympic gold medalist swimmer. Featured cartoons: Louvre Come Back to Me! (1962), Mucho Mouse (1957), Popeye Meets Hercules (1948), Kiddie League (1959), Now Hare This (1958)
775	110	"Advice for Life"	July 30, 2024
Do you need advice? Bill, Toony, and a special guest comedian are here to help. Featured cartoons: Niagara Fools (1956), Birds of a Father (1961), Rover's Rival (1937), The Marry-Go-Round (1943), Tweet Dreams (1959)
776	111	"Dog Days of Summer"	August 1, 2024
Bill and Toony brainstorm ways to beat the heat. Featured cartoons: Rabbitson Crusoe (1956), Muscle Beach Tom (1956), The Great Who-Dood-It (1952), Beep Prepared (1961), All Fowled Up (1955)
777	112	"Off to Sturgis (South Dakota)"	August 2, 2024
On the next stop of Bill and Toony's "Trekkin' All 50" tour, we head to the home of Mount Rushmore. Featured cartoons: The Fair-Haired Hare (1951), Ready, Set, Zoom! (1955), Square Shootin' Square (1955), Bear Feat (1949), Pecos Pest (1955)
778	113	"Hooked On Phobias"	August 5, 2024
We're talking about fears. Don't be afraid, Bill already is. Featured cartoons: High Diving Hare (1949), Hound Hunters (1947), The Scared Crows (1939), Big Game Haunt (1968), Hoppy Daze (1961)
779	114	"Man-made Marvels"	August 7, 2024
Bill and Toony explore the marvels of human ingenuity across the globe. Featured cartoons: Pre-Hysterical Hare (1958), Practical Yolk (1966), It's Greek to Me-ow! (1961), Hare Lift (1952), Attack of the Drones (2004)
780	115	"Way Back In 2004"	August 8, 2024
Toony shows Bill just how much the world has changed in the last 20 years. Featured cartoons: The Year of the Mouse (1965), Robin Hood Daffy (1958), Give and Tyke (1957), Nix on Hypnotricks (1941), For Scent-imental Reasons (1949)
781	116	"Buggin' Out"	August 9, 2024
Toony tries to cure Bill's fear of insects with the help of live tarantula. Featured cartoons: Ant Pasted (1953), The Flea Circus (1954), Pup on a Picnic (1955), Rabbit's Feat (1960), Termites from Mars (1952)
782	117	"On This Day... August 13th"	August 13, 2024
From animals to music, Bill and Toony discuss famous occurrences on August 13th. Featured cartoons: Hare Trigger (1945), The Merry Mutineers (1936), Batty Baseball (1944), Voo-Doo Boo-Boo (1962), Plop Goes the Weasel (1953)
783	118	"The Golden State"	August 15, 2024
Bill and Toony continue their "Trekkin' All 50" tour to sunny California. Featured cartoons: Person to Bunny (1960), Don't Axe Me (1958), Vacation with Play (1951), Bugged in a Rug (1968), Bully for Bugs (1953)
784	119	"Goof Housekeeping"	August 16, 2024
Bill and Toony try to follow a Good Housekeeping Book from 1947. Featured cartoons: Crowing Pains (1947), The Cat's Tale (1941), The Paneless Window Washer (1937), House Cleaning Blues (1937), A Bone for a Bone (1951)
785	120	"1924 - A Hundred Years Old!"	August 20, 2024
Bill and Toony rewind a century to commemorate the milestones of that era. Featured cartoons: Bushy Hare (1950), Calypso Cat (1962), Scrappy Birthday (1949), Dog, Cat, and Canary (1945), Quackodile Tears (1962)
786	121	"The Buckeye State"	August 21, 2024
Next on the "Trekkin' All 50" tour, Bill and Toony venture to the heartland state of Ohio. Clips of Cedar Point are shown. Featured cartoons: Show Biz Bugs (1957), Betty Boop's Ker-Choo (1933), Chiller Dillers (1968), Abusement Park (1947), Beep, Beep (1952)
787	122	"Festivals of Strange"	August 22, 2024
Bill and Toony explore the whimsical world of quirky festivals. Featured cartoons: Goldimouse and the Three Cats (1960), My Friend the Monkey (1939), Southbound Duckling (1955), Cats and Bruises (1965), From Hare to Eternity (1997)
788	123	"Hats Off to Hats"	August 23, 2024
Bill's fascination with hats sparks an exploration into their intricate history. Featured cartoons: Bugs' Bonnets (1956), A Language All My Own (1935), The Screwball (1943), Napoleon Bunny-Part (1956), Yukon Have It (1959)
789	124	"You, the Cartoon Curator"	August 26, 2024
Tooners take over, curating every featured cartoon. Featured cartoons: Rabbit's Kin (1952), Mousie Come Home (1946), Symphony in Slang (1951), Heaven Scent (1956), Romp in a Swamp (1959), The Unmentionables (1963)
790	125	"Younger Than You Think"	August 28, 2024
From sliced bread to the word "teenager," Bill explores things that were invented much more recently than you might imagine. Featured cartoons: Rabbit Romeo (1957), The Foxy Pup (1937), Child Psykolojiky (1941), Superior Duck (1996), Daffy Duck and the Dinosaur (1939)
791	126	"The Grand Canyon State"	August 29, 2024
On the next stop of their "Trekkin' All 50" tour, Bill and Toony explore the Copper State. Featured cartoons: Aqua Duck (1963), Boulder Wham! (1965), Advance and Be Mechanized (1967), Whoops! I'm a Cowboy (1937), Bonanza Bunny (1959)
792	127	"Get in the Groovy"	September 3, 2024
Bill takes Toony on a trip to the psychedelic era of pop culture. Featured cartoons: Dough for the Do-Do (1949), Norman Normal (1968), Horton Hatches the Egg (1942), Hippydrome Tiger (1968), Road Runner a Go-Go (1965)
793	128	"What's Trending"	September 4, 2024
Bill and Toony review what's trending around the world. Featured cartoons: A Bird in a Guilty Cage (1952), Smarty Cat (1955), Ain't That Ducky (1945), Charlie the Rainmaker (1971), To Hare Is Human (1956)
794	129	"Bison Bill's Wild West Show"	September 6, 2024
When Bill tries to unleash his inner cowboy, Toony instead hires a real-life rodeo clown to show him the ropes. Featured cartoons: Drip-Along Daffy (1951), Wild and Woody! (1948), Loco Lobo (1947), Me Feelins is Hurt (1940), To Beep or Not to Beep (1963)
795	130	"Teddy Bear Necessities"	September 9, 2024
Happy National Teddy Bear Day from Bill, Toony, and of course, Teddy Roosevelt himself. Featured cartoons: Sleepy-Time Squirrel (1954), The Wacky Weed (1946), Let Charlie Do It (1972), A Cartoonist's Nightmare (1935), Big Top Bunny (1951)
796	131	"The Peach State"	September 11, 2024
Bill and Toony have Georgia on their minds. Featured cartoons: Double Chaser (1942), The Peachy Cobbler (1950), Southern Fried Hospitality (1960), Honeymoon Hotel (1934), The Sneezing Weasel (1938)
797	132	"Unlikely Duos"	September 12, 2024
In a special 800th episode, extra ordinary best friends Bill and Toony discuss other unconventional pairings, from frenemies to cuisine. Featured cartoons: Feed the Kitty (1952), The Mouse-Merized Cat (1946), Fightin Pals (1940), The Flying Turtle (1953), Compressed Hare (1961)
798	133	"Friday the 13th!"	September 13, 2024
On this spooky day, Bill and Toony talk horror, zombies, and more, with the help of a special guest. Featured cartoons: Hyde and Go Tweet (1960), The Big Snooze (1946), I Don't Scare (1956), Skyscraper Caper (1968), Claws for Alarm (1954)
799	134	"Road Runner & Wile E."	September 17, 2024
Happy 75th birthday to the iconic duo, Wile E. Coyote and the Road Runner. Bill and Toony celebrate with the help of a special guest. Featured cartoons: Fast and Furry-ous (1949), Operation: Rabbit (1952), Beep Prepared (1961), The Wild Chase (1965), The Solid Tin Coyote (1966)
800	135	"Back in '44"	September 18, 2024
A look back at the innovations and culture that kept our spirits up during World War II. Featured cartoons: Puttin' on the Dog (1944), Fish Fry (1944), The Weakly Reporter (1944), Bear Raid Warden (1944), Little Red Riding Rabbit (1944)
801	136	"Pirate Talk"	September 19, 2024
Bill takes National Talk Like a Pirate Day to the extreme. Featured cartoons: Captain Hareblower (1954), Moby Duck (1965), Buccaneer Woodpecker (1953), Shape Ahoy (1945), Gorilla My Dreams (1948)
802	137	"Summer Recap"	September 20, 2024
Bill and Toony make the most of the last moments of summer. Featured cartoons: Now That Summer Is Gone (1938), Pixie Picnic (1948), Ding Dong Doggie (1937), A Hick, a Slick and a Chick (1948), Elmer's Pet Rabbit (1941)
803	138	"The Art of Art"	September 23, 2024
Bill explores his artistic side with the help of an actual master painter. Featured cartoons: A Scent of the Matterhorn (1961), Much Ado About Nutting (1953), Arts and Flowers (1956), Duck Amuck (1953), Tom's Photo Finish (1957)
804	139	"Bill Runs a Marathon"	September 24, 2024
Bill's going the distance, 26.2 miles to be exact. Only this race is more than Bill bargained, or trained, for. Featured cartoons: Tortoise Wins by a Hare (1943), Dumb Like a Fox (1964), Whoa, Be-Gone! (1958), Porky's Naughty Nephew (1938), Bartholomew Versus the Wheel (1964)
805	140	"Famous Expeditions"	September 25, 2024
Bill and Toony take an adventurous exploration around the globe. Featured cartoons: 14 Carrot Rabbit (1952), Operation Cold Feet (1957), Puss 'n' Boats (1966), Ace in the Hole (1942), Dumb Patrol (1964)
806	141	"The Show Me State"	September 26, 2024
Bill and Toony journey through popular Missouri landmarks on the next stop of their "Trekkin' All 50" tour. Featured cartoons: Wild and Woolly Hare (1959), Goggle Fishing Bear (1949), Feud with a Dude (1968), Janie Get Your Gun (1965), Greedy for Tweety (1957)
807	142	"Toony Opens a Club"	September 27, 2024
Toony wants to run his own entertainment joint. But which kind? Bill takes some inspiration from famous hangouts of the past. Featured cartoons: Red Hot Riding Hood (1943), Hollywood Canine Canteen (1946), Tragic Magic (1962), Can You Take It (1934), False Hare (1964)
808	143	"Tooners Pick the Toons"	September 30, 2024
We have another tooner take over. Every featured cartoon is curated by our amazing viewers. Featured cartoons: A Mouse Divided (1953), Sittin' on a Backyard Fence (1933), Well Oiled (1947), I Love to Singa (1936), Hollywood Daffy (1946)
809	144	"Explore and Adore '34"	October 1, 2024
Bill and Toony travel back to 1934 to celebrate the invention of the cheeseburger, the classic sounds of Muzak, and more. Featured cartoons: Scent-imental Over You (1947), Catty Cornered (1953), Axe Me Another (1934), Why Do I Dream Those Dreams? (1934), Double or Mutton (1955)
810	145	"New York State Of Mind"	October 2, 2024
Next on the "Trekkin' All 50" tour, Bill and Toony explore the great state of New York. Featured cartoons: Henhouse Henery (1949), Snowbody Loves Me (1964), Unnatural History (1959), Broadway Bow Wow's (1954), Rabbit Every Monday (1951)
811	146	"Throwback Thursday: 2000"	October 3, 2024
Bill reminisces of the year 2000. Featured cartoons: Nuts and Volts (1964), Guided Mouse-ille (1967), Helter Shelter (1955), The Astroduck (1966), Hare Conditioned (1945)
812	147	"Soul Toony"	October 4, 2024
Bill, Toony, and Mr. Quizzer journey through the timeless harmonies of soul music with the help of a special guest. Featured cartoons: Knighty Knight Bugs (1958), Wet Blanket Policy (1948), Wee-Willie Wildcat (1953), High Note (1960), Rhapsody Rabbit (1946)
813	148	"It's Clubbing Time"	October 8, 2024
Bill and Toony celebrate National 4-H week with traditional club activities. Featured cartoons: Upswept Hare (1953), Corn Plastered (1951), The Draft Horse (1942), Salmon Yeggs (1958), The Bee-Deviled Bruin (1949)
814	149	"Teen Movie High"	October 9, 2024
Bill and Toony make a teen movie. Featured cartoons: Box-Office Bunny (1991), Feather Dusted (1955), Tee for Two (1945), The Film Fan (1939), Blackboard Jumble (1957)
815	150	"The Aloha State"	October 10, 2024
Bill and Toony head to the tropical paradise of Hawaii as part of their "Trekkin' All 50" tour. Featured cartoons: Hawaiian Aye Aye (1964), Popeye the Sailor (1933), Stowaway Woody (1963), Cruise Cat (1952), Wackiki Wabbit (1943)
816	151	"The Cosplay Show"	October 11, 2024
Bill and Toony run into a few almost identical faces at a cartoon curation fan convention. Featured cartoons: Gee Whiz-z-z-z-z-z-z (1956), Rocket-Bye Baby (1956), Parlez Vous Woo (1956), Ventriloquist Cat (1950), Royal Cat Nap (1958)
817	152	"Diners, Drive-ins & Drive-thrus"	October 15, 2024
Bill and Toony cook up the idea to open their own restaurant while exploring the tasty past of diners, drive-ins, and drive-thrus. Featured cartoons: Hurdy-Gurdy Hare (1950), Spree Lunch (1957), I Got Plenty of Mutton (1944), Woody Dines Out (1945), Daffy's Diner (1967)
818	153	"The Last Frontier"	October 16, 2024
Toony and Bill head north to Alaska, the land of bald eagles, northern lights, and... outhouse races? Featured cartoons: The Iceman Ducketh (1964), Half Baked Alaska (1965), The Shooting of Dan McGoo (1945), Klondike Casanova (1946), The Tree Medic (1955)
819	154	"Throwback Thursday: 1979"	October 17, 2024
Get ready to groove as Bill and Toony take you back to 1979, where disco ruled, Walkmans were cool, and unforgettable TV shows and movies hit the spotlight. Featured cartoons: Guided Muscle (1955), Terrier Stricken (1952), Novelty Shop (1936), The Calico Dragon (1935), Mouse and Garden (1960)
820	155	"Alum Chums"	October 18, 2024
Mr. Quizzer and Bill head back to campus for their college homecoming. Featured cartoons: Raw! Raw! Rooster! (1956), Professor Tom (1948), Foot Brawl (1966), Rabbit Seasoning (1952), Room and Wrath (1956)
821	156	"Transylvania Mania"	October 21, 2024
Bill and Toony visit the vampire mecca. Featured cartoons: Transylvania 6-5000 (1963), Monster of Ceremonies (1966), Bats in the Belfry (1942), Hyde and Sneak (1962), Devil's Feud Cake (1963)
822	157	"Our Worst Nightmares"	October 22, 2024
A wicked fish gives Bill, Toony, Quizzer, Simon Shock, and Teddy bad dreams. Featured cartoons: Purr-Chance to Dream (1967), Wotta Nitemare (1939), A Cartoonist's Nightmare (1935), Cobs and Robbers (1953), Hyde and Hare (1955)
823	158	"It's a Murder Mystery..."	October 23, 2024
Someone has killed Mr. Quizzer. Can you solve the mystery? (Don't worry, it's just a game.); Featured cartoons: Deduce, You Say! (1956), Under the Counter Spy (1954), Who Killed Who? (1943), The Scared Crows (1939), A Witch's Tangled Hare (1959)
824	159	"A Monster Bash!"	October 24, 2024
Bill and Toony throw a spooktacular Halloween Party with the help of a special expert. Featured cartoons: Hair-Raising Hare (1946), Franken-Stymied (1961), Spooky Swabs (1957), Timid Tabby (1957), The Night of the Living Duck (1988)
825	160	"The Creepy Carnival"	October 25, 2024
Bill and Toony host their own creepy carnival with some spooky slideshow performances. Featured cartoons: A-Haunting We Will Go (1966), Fright to the Finish (1954), Midnight Frolics (1938), The Flying Sorceress (1956), Satan's Waitin' (1954)
826	161	"Mr. Quizzer's Scavenger Haunt Pt. 1"	October 28, 2024
Mr. Quizzer sends Bill and Toony on a disguising Halloween scavenger hunt. Featured cartoons: Water, Water Every Hare (1952), Witch Crafty (1955), Hyde and Go Tweet (1960), Fowled Up Party (1957), Dr. Jekyll and Mr. Mouse (1947)
827	162	"Mr. Quizzer's Scavenger Haunt Pt. 2"	October 29, 2024
Mr. Quizzer’s scavenger hunt continues with Bill and Toony working hard for tasty rewards. Featured cartoons: Broom-Stick Bunny (1956), Apple Andy (1946), Shiver Me Timbers! (1934), Phantom of the Horse Opera (1961), Dr. Jerkyl's Hide (1954)
828	163	"Mr. Quizzer's Scavenger Haunt Pt. 3"	October 30, 2024
Mr. Quizzer's scavenger hunt takes a chilling turn when Bill and Toony explore a haunted historical house, where spooky surprises await around every corner. Featured cartoons: Scaredy Cat (1948), Wild Bill Hiccup (1970), Is My Palm Read (1933), I Don't Scare (1956), Haunted Mouse (1965)
829	164	"Mr. Quizzer's Scavenger Haunt Finale"	October 31, 2024
Happy Halloween Tooners! Quizzer’s Scavenger Haunt reaches its thrilling conclusion when Bill and Toony face their final eerie challenge. Featured cartoons: The Duxorcist (1987), Big Game Haunt (1968), Hassle in a Castle (1966), Ghosks is the Bunk (1939), Bewitched Bunny (1954)
830	165	"Gourd Almighty!"	November 1, 2024
Bill and Toony indulge in the fall spirit to celebrate the start of November. Featured cartoons: Rabbit Fire (1951), Bunco Busters (1955), Lumber Jerks (1955), The Farmer and the Belle (1950), The High and the Flighty (1956)
831	166	"The Pine Tree State"	November 4, 2024
Bill and Toony continue their "Trekkin' All 50" tour to the great state of Maine. Featured cartoons: Tree's a Crowd (1958), Betty Boop's Crazy Inventions (1933), Babes at Sea (1934), Greetings Bait (1943), From Hare to Heir (1960)
832	167	"Somethin' Sweet"	November 5, 2024
Toony's cravings for sweets reaches heights only a chocolate expert can tame. Featured cartoons: Backwoods Bunny (1959), Porky's Pastry Pirates (1942), Pent-House Mouse (1963), Let's Stalk Spinach (1951), Along Came Daffy (1947)
833	168	"Throwback Thursday: 1959"	November 7, 2024
Bill and Toony rewind to 1959 when slick tailfins and groovy beatnik slang was all the rage. Featured cartoons: Trick or Tweet (1959), Hot-Rod and Reel! (1959), Tomcat Combat (1959), The Bodyguard (1944), A Broken Leghorn (1959)
834	169	"Fall Into the Fad"	November 8, 2024
Bill transforms from casual to chic with the help of a professional stylist. Featured cartoons: Odor of the Day (1948), Red Riding Hoodwinked (1955), The Hams That Couldn't Be Cured (1942), Feudin Fightin-N-Fussin (1968), Safari So Good (1947)
835	170	"Veterans Day"	November 11, 2024
Bill and Toony honor our veterans. Featured cartoons: Super-Rabbit (1943), Ration Bored (1943), Falling Hare (1943), Many Tanks (1942), Forward March Hare (1953)
836	171	"Bill & Toony's Tops"	November 12, 2024
Bill and Toony bring the swingin' sixties back to life with top picks from classic TV, iconic fashion, and some eyebrow-raising culinary "delights" of the decade. Featured cartoons: Rocket Squad (1956), Bugged by a Bee (1969), Shake Your Powder Puff (1934), The Pied Piper of Basin Street (1945), Filet Meow (1966)
837	172	"Challenge of the Channels"	November 13, 2024
Bill and Toony put their athletic skills to the test with the help of a special network guest. Featured cartoons: Piker's Peak (1957), Swimmer Take All (1952), Punchy Pooch (1962), Blue Cat Blues (1956), A Mutt in a Rut (1959)
838	173	"On This Day... November 14th"	November 14, 2024
Bill and Toony spotlight unforgettable moments that happened on November 14th throughout history. Featured cartoons: Hare-Way to the Stars (1958), The Duck Doctor (1952), Popeye's Mirthday (1953), Swing Ding Amigo (1966), Tortoise Beats Hare (1941)
839	174	"The Sunshine State"	November 15, 2024
Pack your sunscreen! Toony and Bill tour Florida from panhandle to keys. Featured cartoons: Rebel Rabbit (1949), Cops Is Always Right (1938), Designs on Jerry (1955), Rock-A-Bye Gator (1962), Cracked Quack (1952)
840	175	"The Keystone State"	November 18, 2024
Bill and Toony embark on a Pennsylvania adventure, exploring iconic landmarks and popular attractions while savoring the best flavors Philly has to offer. Featured cartoons: Robot Rabbit (1953), Happy You and Merry Me (1936), Booby Hatched (1944), Gold Diggin' Woodpecker (1972), Design for Leaving (1954)
841	176	"The Little Merman"	November 19, 2024
Toony turns into a human to see what life with legs is all about. You know, just like the Little Mermaid. Featured cartoons: Hare Remover (1946), Downhearted Duckling (1954), Fin'n Catty (1943), Fish and Chips (1963), Tweety and the Beanstalk (1957)
842	177	"Bill & Toony Open a Video Store"	November 20, 2024
"Toony Video" is going to bring back the VHS rental business. Maybe. Featured cartoons: Cue Ball Cat (1950), Woolen Under Where (1963), Friend or Phony (1952), Rabbit Stew and Rabbits Too! (1969), Quack Shot (1954)
843	178	"Tweety's Debut"	November 21, 2024
Bill and Toony celebrate Tweety's big day with a special guest appearance and a lineup of cartoons featuring the beloved yellow canary. Featured cartoons: A Tale of Two Kitties (1942), Birdy and the Beast (1944), Tweetie Pie (1947), Muzzle Tough (1954), Carrotblanca (1995)
844	179	"On Location"	November 22, 2024
Bill and Toony take a cinematic journey to legendary movie locations. Featured cartoons: The A-Tom-inable Snowman (1966), Chariots of Fur (1994), Firemen's Brawl (1953), Rabbit Punch (1948), Wags to Riches (1949)
845	180	"Let's Go to the Mall"	November 26, 2024
Bill and Toony are ready for a mall adventure, only to be stunned by how much it's changed over the years. Featured cartoons: Heir-Conditioned (1955), The Mad Hatter (1948), Early to Bet (1951), A Bird in a Guilty Cage (1952), Book Revue (1946)
846	181	"The Beaver State"	November 27, 2024
Bill and Toony explore Oregon from coast to desert, popping into Portland and scaling Mt. Hood. Featured cartoons: Draftee Daffy (1945), Busybody Bear (1952), Woody the Giant Killer (1947), The House That Jack Built (1939), Stop! Look! And Hasten! (1954)
847	182	"A Day of Thanks"	November 28, 2024
From football and dressed-up turkeys to delicious leftovers with a special guest chef, Bill and Toony are in for their happiest Thanksgiving yet. Featured cartoons: Holiday for Drumsticks (1949), The Little Orphan (1949), Airlift a la Carte (1971), Betty Boop and Little Jimmy (1936), Shishkabugs (1962)
848	183	"Black Friday"	November 29, 2024
Bill convinces Toony to help face the Black Friday madness for the hottest new toy. Featured cartoons: A Bird in a Bonnet (1958), Clash and Carry (1961), Silly Hillbilly (1949), Merry Mannequins (1937), Riff Raffy Daffy (1948)
849	184	"Tooners Pick the Toons II"	December 2, 2024
You know them, you love them, and now you’ve picked them. Bill and Toony show the cartoons handpicked by our incredible viewers. Featured cartoons: Wabbit Twouble (1941), Pigs is Pigs (1937), Too Hop to Handle (1956), Show Biz Bugs (1957), Baseball Bugs (1946)
850	185	"Colorful Colorado"	December 4, 2024
Bill and Toony trek their way to the colored red state. Featured cartoons: What's My Lion? (1961), Bridge Ahoy! (1936), Snow Place Like Home (1966), Fastest with the Mostest (1960), Buckaroo Bugs (1944)
851	186	"Bills, Bills, Bills"	December 5, 2024
Sitcom superstar Billy Gardell (Mike & Molly, Bob Hearts Abishola) hangs out with Bill and Toony. Featured cartoons: Fit to Be Tied (1952), Mountain Ears (1939), Alpine Antics (1936), Billy Boy (1954), Swooner Crooner (1944); Special Guest Appearance: Billy Gardell as himself.
852	187	"Historic Feuds"	December 10, 2024
From royal rule to fictional families, Bill and Toony tackle legendary rivalries. Featured cartoons: Canned Feud (1951), The Wild Chase (1965), Naughty Neighbors (1939), When I Yoo Hoo (1936), Sahara Hare (1955)
853	188	"The Silver State"	December 11, 2024
Bill and Toony embrace the extraordinariness of Nevada, from the glitz and glam of Vegas to alien encounters. Featured cartoons: Grin and Share It (1957), Fistic Mystic (1969), Jumpin' Jupiter (1955), Going! Going! Gosh! (1952), Hare and Loathing in Las Vegas (2004)
854	189	"Throwback Thursday: 1951"	December 12, 2024
Bill and Toony journey back to the nifty year of 1951. Featured cartoons: The Unexpected Pest (1956), Scent-imental Romeo (1951), Cat Napping (1951), Puny Express (1951), Ballot Box Bunny (1951)
855	190	"Holiday Countdown"	December 16, 2024
Bill and Toony kick off the holiday festivities with two special guests. Featured cartoons: Bedtime for Sniffles (1940), Snow Business (1953), A Gander at Mother Goose (1940), Deep Freeze Squeeze (1964), Spaced Out Bunny (1980)
856	191	"Toy Soldiers"	December 17, 2024
Toony surprises Bill with a special guest performance. Featured cartoons: Gifts from the Air (1937), A Street Cat Named Sylvester (1953), I'm Cold (1954), Toy Town Hall (1936), Hare Force (1944)
857	192	"The Gift of the Toon Guys"	December 18, 2024
Bill and Toony reenact "The Gift of the Magi" in a heartwarming Christmas tale. Featured cartoons: Gift Wrapped (1952), Busy Bakers (1940), Hay Rube (1954), Home Sweet Homewrecker (1962), Heavenly Puss (1949)
858	193	"A Festive Journey"	December 19, 2024
Bill and Toony head out on a festive journey to experience many different holiday traditions. Featured cartoons: The Pups' Christmas (1936), Robinson Gruesome (1959), Seasin's Greetinks! (1933), Holiday for Shoestrings (1946), One Ham's Family (1943)
859	194	"Mr. Quizzer's (Baby) Blue Christmas"	December 20, 2024
Beloved game show host Mr. Quizzer hosts his first retro-styled holiday variety special. Featured cartoons: Daffy Duck Hunt (1949), Swiss Miss-fit (1957), Freeze Frame (1979), Seal on the Loose (1970), Kitty Kornered (1946)
860	195	"North Pole Pals"	December 23, 2024
Bill and Toony travel to the North Pole in hopes of meeting Santa Claus. Featured cartoons: Snow Excuse (1966), Sleepy Time Bear (1969), The Peachy Cobbler (1950), Snowtime for Comedy (1941), Ski for Two (1944)
861	196	"Toony's Really, Really Late Christmas Eve Show"	December 24, 2024
When Toony can't sleep on Christmas Eve, he hosts a late-night talk show with special guests Mr. and Mrs. Claus. Featured cartoons: The Night Before Christmas (1941), Mister and Mistletoe (1955), Barney Bear's Polar Pest (1944), Hopalong Casualty (1960), The Abominable Snow Rabbit (1961)
862	197	"A Merry Christmas to All!"	December 25, 2024
Bill and Toony celebrate Christmas and warm up with a holiday beverage. Featured cartoons: Bugs Bunny's Christmas Carol (1979), Pantry Panic (1941), Hot and Cold Penguin (1955), Strangled Eggs (1961), Fright Before Christmas (1979)
863	198	"2024 Rewind"	December 31, 2024
Bill and Toony go on a magical journey through 2024. Featured cartoons: Baton Bunny (1959), Golden Yeggs (1950), The Football Toucher Downer (1937), Matinee Mouse (1966), What's Opera, Doc? (1957)
