= Hollywood Canine Canteen =

- Directed by: Robert McKimson
- Story by: Warren Foster
- Starring: Mel Blanc; Sara Berner; Paul Regan; Paul Corley; Gil Turner; Robert Lyons
- Music by: Carl W. Stalling
- Animation by: Cal Dalton; Don Williams; Richard Bickenbach
- Backgrounds by: Richard H. Thomas
- Color process: Technicolor
- Production company: Warner Bros. Cartoons
- Distributed by: Warner Bros. Pictures
- Release date: April 20, 1946
- Running time: 7:44
- Language: English

Hollywood Canine Canteen is a 1946 Warner Bros. Merrie Melodies cartoon directed by Robert McKimson. The short was released on April 20, 1946.

The cartoon features various caricatures of Hollywood film celebrities and famous jazz musicians of the day, all zoomorphized as dogs.

== Plot ==
The canine pets of Hollywood stars meet and decide they need their own nightclub. The cartoon tours the nightclub and presents a series of vignettes featuring dog-styled caricatures of Hollywood celebrities.

== Notes ==
There are many dog-styled caricatures of Hollywood personalities in this cartoon.

- Chairing the meeting is Edward G. Robinson
- Speaking at the meeting is Jimmy Durante
- Seated at the meeting are: Ed Wynn; Monty Woolley; ventriloquist Edgar Bergen and doll Charlie McCarthy; Laurel & Hardy
- Welcoming the Sailor (voiced by Mel Blanc) and the Soldier to the Canteen: Bing Crosby (voiced by Paul Regan), also seen later; an unknown soldier and sailor, many either from the US Army, US Marines, US Navy) (The blonde woman who takes care of the soldiers uniform is Lauren Bacall)
- On stage: Jerry Colonna (voiced by Blanc) and Bob Hope; Carmen Miranda, dancing with her signature fruit headdress; Babbit and Catstello (caricatures of Abbott and Costello, from other cartoons such as A Tale of Two Kitties; only here, they are dogs; Catstello is also voiced by Blanc)
- At the snack bar: Arthur Lake (as Dagwood, here called "Dogwood" and voiced by Paul Corley); Penny Singleton (as Blondie Bumstead and voiced by Sara Berner)
- Laurel and Hardy again, washing dishes
- In the lounge with the wall portraits: an unknown woman in a red dress (possibly Joan Leslie) with a red bow in her hair; an unknown long-haired man stumbling
- At the phone desk: an unknown soldier (a southern US soldier Jackie Kelk (who played Henry Aldrich in The Aldrich Family) due to his southern accent with a quirky voice), wanting to place a call; an unknown woman seated at a desk with a New Jersey accent (sounded like Paulette Goddard)
- The conductor is Leopold Stokowski, parodied in other WB cartoons such as Hollywood Steps Out and Goofy Groceries; the musicians are likely anonymous, except for the tuba player, Joe Besser (voiced by Blanc; Besser later co-starred in the Three Stooges)
- Bing Crosby (voiced by Gil Turner instead of Regan, audio recycled from Swooner Crooner), crooning while stuffing a pipe; Frank Sinatra (voiced by Robert Lyons); Dorothy Lamour
- Bandleader Kay Kyser (as Kaynine Kyser); poet and cornet player Merwyn Bogue (aka Ish Kabibble) as "Ish Kapoodle"
- Dancing soldier and woman (possibly Rita Hayworth)
- Woman in a blue dress (looks like Kate Smith) consoling weeping soldier
- Dancing woman who wants to "cut a rug" (looks and sounds like Martha Raye)
- Trumpeter Harry James (as "Hairy James"); trombonist Tommy Dorsey as "Tommy Dorgy"; xylophonist Lionel Hampton as "Lionel Hambone and his Bonophone"; clarinetist Benny Goodman as "Boney Goodman"; Jimmy Durante again, playing the piano as "Schnauser Durante" (a play on Durante's nickname, "The Schnoz")

== Home media ==
- Hollywood Canine Canteen is available on The Golden Age of Looney Tunes Volume 2 laserdisc.
- Hollywood Canine Canteen is available, uncensored and uncut, on Looney Tunes Golden Collection: Volume 6, Disc 2.
