= Mice Follies =

Mice Follies may refer to:

- Mice Follies (1954 film), a 1954 Tom & Jerry cartoon directed by William Hanna & Joseph Barbera
- Mice Follies (1960 film), a 1960 Looney Tunes cartoon directed by Robert McKimson, a parody of Jackie Gleason's The Honeymooners
