= Tedd Pierce =

American screenwriter (1906–1972)

- Born: Edward Stacey Pierce III; August 12, 1906; Quogue, New York, U.S.
- Died: February 19, 1972 (aged 65); Los Angeles, California, U.S.
- Other name: Ted Pierce
- Occupations: Animation screenwriter; voice actor
- Years active: 1933–1968
- Employer(s): Leon Schlesinger Productions/Warner Bros. Cartoons (1933–1939, 1941–1964); Fleischer Studios (1939–1941); UPA (1953); Walter Lantz Productions (1961–1962); Rembrandt Films/Metro-Goldwyn-Mayer cartoon studio (1962)
- Spouse: Wanda Reeves (m. 1928)
- Children: 1

Edward Stacey "Tedd" Pierce III (August 12, 1906 – February 19, 1972) was an American screenwriter and voice actor of animated cartoons, principally from the mid-1930s to the late 1950s.

== Biography ==
Pierce was the son of a stockbroker, Samuel Cuppels Pierce, who in turn was the son of Edward S. Pierce, a long-serving treasurer of the St. Louis-based Samuel Cuppels Woodenware Company. Pierce completed his education through the fourth year of high school, according to the 1940 census records.

Pierce spent the majority of his career as a writer for the Warner Bros. "Termite Terrace" animation studio, whose other notable alumni include Chuck Jones and Michael Maltese, contributing storylines and gags for numerous shorts from 1935 until his departure in 1959. Pierce also worked as a writer at Fleischer Studios from 1939 to 1941. Jones credited Pierce in his autobiography Chuck Amuck: The Life and Times of an Animated Cartoonist (1989) as being the inspiration for the character Pepé Le Pew, the haplessly romantic French skunk due to Pierce's self-proclamation that he was a ladies' man. He had one son, named Geoffrey Pierce, from a former marriage.

In early credits, his name was spelled "T-E-D". He was said to have added an extra "D" to his name as a way of lampooning puppeteer Bil Baird when he dropped one of the "L"s from his first name.

He contributed (with Bill Danch) the story of the Tom and Jerry short Tall in the Trap (1962), directed by Gene Deitch.

In his Warners career, Pierce worked with three of the best-known Warner animation directors (Jones, Robert McKimson and Friz Freleng). While rotating between Jones and Freleng (often in collaboration with Michael Maltese) for much of the 1940s, the dissolution of their partnership in 1946 left Pierce reassigned solely to Freleng's unit. Freleng would, however, replace Pierce with Warren Foster (then McKimson's primary storyman) in 1949 owing to his dissatisfaction with Pierce's output, reassigning Pierce to McKimson's unit for much of his remaining tenure at Warner's. Pierce's credited output includes Freleng's Hare Do (1949), Bad Ol' Putty Tat (1949), Bunker Hill Bunny (1950) and Big House Bunny (1950); Jones' Hare Tonic (1945, an early success for both of them) and Broom-Stick Bunny (1956); and McKimson's Hillbilly Hare (1950), Lovelorn Leghorn (1951) and Cat-Tails for Two (1953), the last of which was Speedy Gonzales' first appearance. Because much of Pierce's Termite Terrace career was spent with McKimson's unit, however, it would follow that Pierce was generally overshadowed by his contemporaries Maltese and Foster.

Pierce also got occasional voice work in the shorts: he gave voice to the tough guy in Into Your Dance (1935), Jack Bunny in I Love to Singa (1936), King Bombo in Gulliver's Travels (1939), and the villainous C. Bagley Beetle in Mr. Bug Goes to Town (1941), in addition to writing on those films.

He imitated Bud Abbott in one Warner short casting Abbott and Costello as alley cats Babbit and Catstello (A Tale of Two Kitties) and two Warner shorts casting them as mice (Tale of Two Mice and The Mouse-Merized Cat). Pierce also voiced Tom Dover in The Dover Boys, the "tall, thin" character in Wackiki Wabbit, and the French chef Louis in French Rarebit. In addition, in a few shorts containing Jones' Hubie and Bertie characters, Pierce voiced Hubie, and Maltese played Bertie. Thereafter they were voiced by the principal voice actor, Mel Blanc, and Stan Freberg, who had also voiced secondary Looney Tunes/Merrie Melodies duos such as the Goofy Gophers and Spike the Bulldog and Chester the Terrier.

While it was speculated that Pierce did voice-work for coming-attractions trailers for Universal Studios, experts in the voice acting field such as Keith Scott m disputed this point.

== Filmography ==
Year	Title	Role	Notes
1936	At Your Service Madame	W.C. Squeals	Voice (uncredited)
1936	Toy Town Hall	Ben Bernie imitation	Voice (uncredited)
1936	The CooCoo Nut Grove	Ben Birdie/W.C. Squeals	Voice (uncredited)
1937	Uncle Tom's Bungalow	Narrator	Voice (uncredited)
1937	The Lyin' Mouse		Writer
1937	The Woods Are Full of Cuckoos	Ben Birdie/Tizzy Fish/Jack Bunny	Voice (uncredited)
1937	September in the Rain		Writer
1938	My Little Buckaroo		Writer
1938	A Star is Hatched		Writer
1938	Cinderella Meets Fella		Writer
1938	Little Pancho Vanilla		Writer
1938	The Night Watchman		Writer
1939	Gulliver's Travels	King Bombo	Voice (uncredited)
1941	Mr. Bug Goes to Town	C. Bagley Beetle	Voice
1942	The Draft Horse		Writer
1942	Hold the Lion, Please		Writer
1942	The Squawkin' Hawk	Rooster	Voice (uncredited)
1942	Fox Pop		Writer
1942	The Dover Boys at Pimento University; or, The Rivals of Roquefort Hall	Tom Dover/Larry Dover	Voice (uncredited), writer
1942	A Tale of Two Kitties	Babbit	Voice (uncredited)
1942	Ding Dog Daddy		Writer
1942	Case of the Missing Hare		Writer
1943	To Duck or Not to Duck		Writer
1943	Super-Rabbit	Man #2/Football cheerleader	Voice (uncredited), writer
1943	Greetings Bait		Writer
1943	The Aristo-Cat	Bertie	Voice (uncredited), writer
1943	Yankee Doodle Daffy		Writer
1943	Wackiki Wabbit	Tall castaway	Voice (uncredited), writer
1943	Inki and the Minah Bird		Writer
1944	Tom Turk and Daffy		Writer
1944	Bugs Bunny and the Three Bears		Writer
1944	Bugs Bunny Nips the Nips		Writer
1944	Duck Soup to Nuts		Writer
1944	Hare Force	Sylvester the Dog	Voice (uncredited), writer
1944	Goldilocks and the Jivin' Bears		Writer
1944	Lost and Foundling		Writer
1945	Odor-able Kitty		Writer
1945	Trap Happy Porky		Writer
1945	Life with Feathers		Writer
1945	Hare Conditioned		Writer
1945	Hare Tonic		Writer
1946	Holiday for Shoestrings		Writer
1946	Quentin Quail	Quentin Quail	Voice (uncredited), writer
1946	Hush My Mouse		Writer
1946	Hair-Raising Hare		Writer
1946	The Eager Beaver		Writer
1946	Fair and Worm-er		Writer
1946	Rhapsody Rabbit		Writer
1946	Roughly Squeaking		Writer
1947	The Gay Anties		Writer
1947	Scent-imental Over You	Crowd	Voice (uncredited), writer
1947	A Hare Grows in Manhattan		Writer
1947	Tweetie Pie		Writer, Won the 1948 Academy Award for Best Animated Short Film
1947	Rabbit Transit		Writer
1947	Along Came Daffy		Writer
1947	A Pest in the House		Writer
1947	House Hunting Mice		Writer
1947	Little Orphan Airedale		Writer
1947	Slick Hare		Writer
1948	A Feather in His Hare		Writer
1948	What's Brewin', Bruin?		Writer
1948	Back Alley Oproar		Writer
1948	I Taw a Putty Tat		Writer
1948	Rabbit Punch		Writer
1948	Buccaneer Bunny		Writer
1948	Bugs Bunny Rides Again	Crowd	Voice (uncredited), writer
1948	You Were Never Duckier		Writer
1948	Hare Splitter		Writer
1948	Kit for Cat		Writer
1949	Wise Quackers		Writer
1949	Hare Do		Writer
1949	High Diving Hare		Writer
1949	Curtain Razor		Writer
1949	Mouse Mazurka		Writer
1949	Knights Must Fall		Writer
1949	Bad Ol' Putty Tat		Writer
1949	Dough for the Do-Do		Writer
1949	Each Dawn I Crow		Writer
1949	Which is Witch?		Writer
1950	Mutiny on the Bunny		Writer
1950	The Lion's Busy		Writer
1950	Big House Bunny		Writer
1950	His Bitter Half		Writer
1950	All a Bir-r-r-d		Writer
1950	Golden Yeggs		Writer
1950	Hillbilly Hare		Writer
1950	Bunker Hill Bunny		Writer
1950	Canary Row		Writer
1951	Room and Bird		Writer
1951	French Rarebit		Writer
1951	Lovelorn Leghorn		Writer
1951	Sleepy Time Possum		Writer
1951	Big Top Bunny		Writer
1951	The Prize Pest		Writer
1952	Who's Kitten Who?		Writer
1952	Thumb Fun		Writer
1952	Kiddin' the Kitten		Writer
1952	Sock a Doodle Do		Writer
1952	The Turn-Tale Wolf		Writer
1952	Oily Hare		Writer
1952	Hoppy-Go-Lucky		Writer
1952	The EGGcited Rooster		Writer
1952	The Super Snooper		Writer
1952	Fool Coverage		Writer
1953	Upswept Hare		Writer
1953	A Peck o' Trouble		Writer
1953	Muscle Tussle		Writer
1953	There Auto Be a Law		Writer
1953	Plop Goes the Weasel		Writer
1953	Cat-Tails for Two		Writer
1953	Easy Peckin's		Writer
1953	Cats A-Weigh!		Writer
1954	Wild Wife		Writer
1954	Design for Leaving		Writer
1954	Bell Hoppy		Writer
1954	Little Boy Boo		Writer
1955	When Magoo Flew		Writer, Won the 1955 Academy Award for Best Animated Short Film
1955	Feather Dusted		Writer
1955	Knight-mare Hare		Writer
1956	Bugs' Bonnets		Writer
1956	Weasel Stop		Writer
1956	The High and the Flighty		Writer
1956	Broom-Stick Bunny		Writer
1956	Rocket Squad		Writer
1956	Mixed Master		Writer
1956	Stupor Duck		Writer
1956	Barbary Coast Bunny		Writer
1956	Half-Fare Hare		Writer
1956	Raw! Raw! Rooster!		Writer
1956	The Slap-Hoppy Mouse		Writer
1956	Wideo Wabbit		Writer
1956	Two Crows from Tacos		Writer
1956	The Honey-Mousers		Writer
1957	Bedevilled Rabbit		Writer
1957	Cheese It, the Cat!		Writer
1957	Boston Quackie		Writer
1957	Tabasco Road		Writer
1957	Ducking the Devil		Writer
1957	Mouse-Taken Identity		Writer
1958	Don't Axe Me		Writer
1958	Tortilla Flaps		Writer
1958	Feather Bluster		Writer
1958	Now Hare This		Writer
1958	Dog Tales		Writer
1958	Pre-Hysterical Hare		Writer
1958	Gopher Broke		Writer
1959	Mouse-Placed Kitten		Writer
1959	China Jones		Writer
1959	The Mouse That Jack Built		Writer
1959	A Mutt in a Rut		Writer
1959	Backwoods Bunny		Writer
1959	Cat's Paw		Writer
1959	Bonanza Bunny		Writer
1959	People Are Bunny		Writer
1960	West of the Pesos		Writer
1960	Wild Wild World		Writer
1960	Crockett-Doodle-Do		Writer
1960	Mice Follies		Writer
1960	The Dixie Fryer		Writer
1960	Dog Gone People		Writer
1961	Cannery Woe		Writer
1961	Hoppy Daze		Writer
1961	Strangled Eggs		Writer
1961	The Abominable Snow Rabbit		Writer
1962	The Slick Chick		Writer
1964	Freudy Cat		Writer
1964	Hawaiian Aye Aye		Writer
1966	The Astroduck		Writer (uncredited)
1966	A-Haunting We Will Go		Writer (uncredited)
1968	What's So Bad About Feeling Good?		Writer (final role)
