= The Big Snooze =

1946 animated short film by Bob Clampett

- Title card
- Directed by: Bob Clampett; Arthur Davis (both uncredited)
- Story by: Bob Clampett (uncredited)
- Starring: Mel Blanc; Arthur Q. Bryan (uncredited)
- Music by: Carl Stalling
- Animation by: Rod Scribner; I. Ellis; Manny Gould; J.C. Melendez
- Layouts by: Thomas McKimson
- Backgrounds by: Philip DeGuard
- Color process: Technicolor
- Production company: Warner Bros. Cartoons
- Distributed by: Warner Bros. Pictures; The Vitaphone Corporation
- Release date: October 5, 1946
- Running time: 7:25
- Country: United States
- Language: English

The Big Snooze is a 1946 Warner Bros. Looney Tunes cartoon initiated by Bob Clampett and completed by Arthur Davis, both of whom were both uncredited as directors. It features Bugs Bunny and Elmer Fudd, voiced by Mel Blanc and Arthur Q. Bryan.

Its title was inspired by the 1939 book The Big Sleep, and its 1946 film adaptation, also a Warner release.

== Plot ==
Bugs and Elmer are in the midst of their usual hunting-chasing scenario. After Bugs tricks Elmer into running through a hollow log and off a cliff three times, Elmer angrily quits because he feels that the writers never let him catch the rabbit. He tears up his Warner Bros. cartoon contract and walks off the set to devote his life to fishing, stunning Bugs, who piteously asks him to reconsider.

During a relaxing fishing trip, Elmer falls asleep. Bugs observes Elmer's nap, remarks that the dream he notices Elmer is having — that of a classic log and saw, representing snoring — is "a heavenly dream". Then, Bugs decides he had "better look into this", and downs a sleeping pill. He dreams he is inside Elmer's dream, in a boat crooning "Someone's Rocking My Dreamboat". He decides to use Nightmare Paint to disrupt the "serene scene".

Within Elmer's dreamland, Bugs creates unsettling situations: Elmer appears nearly nude, wearing only his derby hat and a strategically placed "loincloth" consisting of a laurel wreath. Next, in a musical parody of "The Campbells Are Coming", and a visual parody of the Pink Elephants on Parade sequence from the Disney film Dumbo (1941), Bugs creates a situation where "miwwions and twiwwions of wabbits" are dancing over Elmer while Bugs' voice is heard singing, "The rabbits are coming. Hooray! Hooray!" When Elmer asks where they are all coming from, Bugs replies, "From me, Doc," and is shown literally multiplying them from an adding machine.

Looking for another way to torment Elmer, Bugs consults the book A Thousand and One Arabian Nightmares, exclaiming, "Oh, no! It's too gruesome!" before peeking over the book to cheerfully tell the audience, "But I'll do it!" Elmer realizes what Bugs has in mind, pleading, "No, no! No, not that! Not that, please!" as Bugs ties him to railroad tracks, just as "the Super Chief" (Bugs in an Indian chief's war bonnet, leading a conga line of baby rabbits) crosses over Elmer's head.

Elmer talks to the audience in The Big Snooze, animated by Manny Gould.

Elmer chases Bugs through a surreal landscape, and Bugs inquires, "What's the matter doc, ya cold? Here, I'll fix dat." Before Elmer can react, Bugs dresses him in drag, (dress, wig, lipstick) transforming the inept hunter into a woman with an hourglass figure who resembles Rita Hayworth. Bugs inspects his handiwork, then lifts the backdrop to reveal a trio of literal wolves in Zoot suits, lounging by the sign at Hollywood and Vine, who catcall at Elmer. Bugs then "helps" Elmer escape by doing a series of bizarre running cycles, resulting in the both of them jumping off a cliff.

As Bugs and Elmer falls from the cliff, Bugs drinks some "Hare Tonic (Stops Falling Hare)" and screeches to a halt in mid-air, while the dream Elmer continues to careen toward earth, finally crash-landing into the real Elmer's snoozing body. He wakes up with a start, exclaiming, "Ooh, what a howwible nightmare!"

Elmer dashes back to the cartoon's original background, pieces his Warner contract back together, and agrees to continue. The chase through the log begins anew. Bugs faces the audience in a closeup, finishing with the catchphrase from the "Beulah" character on the radio show Fibber McGee and Molly, "Ah love dat man!"

== Reception ==
Animation historian Jerry Beck writes, "In The Big Snooze, Clampett, who has drawn up imaginary worlds several times before, outdoes himself with the imagery in Elmer's nightmare. The abstract rabbits foreshadow the minimalism of United Productions of America (UPA) cartoons, and the surreal landscape combining clouds, yellow skies, and musical notes is the closest we'll come to visualizing a Looney Tunes acid trip."

== Notes ==
The Big Snooze was left unfinished upon Bob Clampett's departure. According to historian Milton Gray, Arthur Davis completed the short but didn't understand Clampett's humor, so he had to finish what he had and scrapped the rest. Clampett would not see the completed film until decades later and admitted to Gray that some things in the short were done very different from his original intention.

== See also ==
- Bugs Bunny filmography
- Elmer Fudd filmography
- Looney Tunes and Merrie Melodies filmography (1940–1949)

Preceded by Racketeer Rabbit	Bugs Bunny Cartoons; 1946	Succeeded by Rhapsody Rabbit
