= Cheese It, the Cat! =

- Directed by: Robert McKimson
- Story by: Tedd Pierce
- Starring: Daws Butler (uncredited); June Foray (uncredited); Mel Blanc (uncredited)
- Edited by: Treg Brown
- Music by: Carl Stalling; Milt Franklyn
- Animation by: Ted Bonnicksen; Keith Darling; George Grandpre
- Layouts by: Robert Gribbroek
- Backgrounds by: Bob Majors
- Color process: Technicolor
- Production company: Warner Bros. Cartoons
- Distributed by: Warner Bros. Pictures
- Release date: May 4, 1957
- Running time: 7 minutes
- Language: English

Cheese It, the Cat! is a 1957 Warner Bros. Looney Tunes cartoon, directed by Robert McKimson. The short was released on May 4, 1957, and is the second of three McKimson cartoons parodying television's The Honeymooners (the others being The Honey-Mousers and Mice Follies).

== Plot ==
Ralph Crumden comes home to prepare a surprise birthday for his wife Alice. What prevents Ralph from getting the birthday cake is a cat in the kitchen. Ralph goes to the kitchen sink to ask Ned Morton for help.

Ned Morton gets Ralph to ride a clockwork armored car with a cannon. As Ralph prepares to fire the cannon on the cat, the cat backfires the cannon on Ralph, forcing Ralph to retreat. Next, Ralph paints so-called invisible ink (actually water) on Ned, convincing him that he is invisible. Ned confidently walks past the cat, even honking his nose and plucking a whisker. When Ned returns, he has eaten the cake he was supposed to bring. Ralph, getting impatient, has Ned paint him with the "invisible ink" and Ralph goes to the fridge, only to be massacred by the cat. Next, Ned launches Ralph from a champagne bottle cork right into the cat's mouth and through his tail right over to the fridge, but the cat forces Ralph to retreat again. Both mice then lure the cat onto the sink so that they can put his tail down the plughole. Then they activate the garbage disposal, causing the cat to lose much of his fur and giving the mice the chance to take a cupcake from the fridge.

Ralph and Ned finally have everything ready for Alice. Alice is flattered by Ralph's surprise. Unfortunately, Ned put firecrackers instead of candles on the cupcake. After passing it to and from, Ralph and Ned push the cupcake in the cat's face through Ralph's front door, causing the cat to fly on to the ceiling light, leaving him dazed.

== See also ==
- Looney Tunes and Merrie Melodies filmography (1950–1959)
