= People Are Bunny =

- Lobby card
- Directed by: Robert McKimson
- Story by: Tedd Pierce
- Produced by: John W. Burton; William Orcutt
- Starring: Mel Blanc (all other voices); June Foray (all other voices - uncredited); Daws Butler (Art Lamplighter)
- Edited by: Treg Brown
- Music by: Milt Franklyn
- Animation by: Warren Batchelder; Tom Ray; Ted Bonnicksen; George Grandpré; David R. Green
- Layouts by: Robert Gribbroek
- Backgrounds by: William Butler
- Color process: Technicolor
- Production company: Warner Bros. Cartoons
- Distributed by: Warner Bros. Pictures; Vitaphone
- Release date: December 19, 1959
- Running time: 6 minutes
- Language: English

People Are Bunny is a 1959 Warner Bros. Merrie Melodies cartoon, directed by Robert McKimson. The short was released on December 19, 1959, and stars Bugs Bunny and Daffy Duck.

People Are Bunny spoofs the Art Linkletter show People are Funny (where people performed different "stunts" to win money) where the parody of Art Linkletter is voiced by Daws Butler.

== Plot ==
Watching TV, Daffy Duck is excited by an episode of the hunting show called "The QTTV Sportsman Hour" in which the host, voiced by Mel Blanc somewhat in the manner of actor Frank Nelson, offers $1,000.00 for the first viewer to bring a rabbit to Station QTTV. Attempting to convince Bugs Bunny to come to the station, Daffy first tries a ruse with TV show tickets, but Bugs immediately suspects Daffy is up to no good and declines. Daffy then grabs a gun from Bugs' fireplace and tells Bugs to oblige or be shot.

At the scene of Station QTTV, Daffy has Bugs at gunpoint when they see a parade of prizes coming out of a studio (car, boat, fur coat, refrigerator, "Key to Fort Knox", etc.), and they see people going into the show People Are Phoney starring Art Lamplighter. With dollar signs in his eyes, Daffy locks Bugs in a telephone booth and runs into the studio. Bugs receives a call in the telephone booth from an announcer who tells Bugs if he correctly answers a question, he will win a jackpot. Bugs answers the math question and the jackpot dispenses through the coin return slot. The announcer then asks Bugs how he knew the answer so quickly. Bugs says, "One thing we rabbits know how to do is multiply."

Meanwhile, Daffy appears as a contestant on People Are Phoney (starring Art Lamplighter) where his task is to help a little old lady across the street while on camera. Things backfire in a hurry when the old lady starts belting Daffy with her umbrella, belligerently declaring she does not need help crossing the street. Daffy staggers, is missed by a speeding truck ("Nyaah, ya' missed me", he gloats, sticking out his tongue), then gets hit by a motorcycle. Lamplighter tells the hysterical audience that Daffy did not quite make it, and that it goes to show that "People Are Phoney."

Sorely mad, Daffy comes back to the telephone booth where Bugs is counting the jackpot. Bugs says he got a call in the phone booth, which Daffy does not believe. Bugs says at any time now an announcer might call again. Bugs makes the sound of a ringing phone and cons Daffy into thinking they want another contestant. Daffy pushes Bugs out of the booth, telling Bugs to let him have it. Daffy grabs the "receiver" - now a stick of dynamite - and it explodes as Bugs walks away. He shrugs and says: "So I let him have it."

Looking for Bugs, Daffy asks a studio usher (actually Bugs in disguise) if he saw a rabbit. Bugs points him to a door, and Daffy is sent into the show Were You There (a takeoff of the show You Are There) which happens to be reenacting "Indian Massacre At Burton's Bend." Daffy then comes out with his head having been scalped by Indians as he mutters "All right, where's the wise guy?" slapping his scalp back onto his head.

At the end, Bugs is disguised as a producer and he tells Daffy that he is suddenly wanted for Costume Party (a reference to the real Masquerade Party), tricking him into donning a rabbit costume. The show he is sent to is the QTTV Sportsman Hour to which Daffy intended to bring Bugs and Bugs collects the fee Daffy wanted for himself. When Daffy protests that he is no rabbit but a duck, the host declares it is now duck season, and a bunch of hunters shoot at Daffy. Bugs shrugs off Daffy's plight, noting: "Eh, they always shoot blanks on TV," Daffy, his beak full of bullet holes, mutters: "'Blanks', he says." Emptying a stack of buckshot from his mouth, he offers them to Bugs: "Have a handful of blanks! Sheesh!"

== Production ==
The short reuses animation from Wideo Wabbit, Bonanza Bunny, and A Star Is Bored.

== Home media ==
People Are Bunny is available, uncensored and uncut, on the Looney Tunes Super Stars' Daffy Duck: Frustrated Fowl DVD. However, it was cropped to widescreen. In 2020, the cartoon was re-released restored, uncut and in its original 4:3 aspect ratio on the Bugs Bunny 80th Anniversary Collection Blu-ray.

== See also ==
- List of American films of 1959

Preceded by A Witch's Tangled Hare	Bugs Bunny Cartoons; 1959	Succeeded by Horse Hare
