= Mice Follies (1960 film) =

1960 film by Robert McKimson

- Directed by: Robert McKimson
- Story by: Tedd Pierce
- Edited by: Treg Brown
- Music by: Milt Franklyn
- Animation by: Warren Batchelder; Ted Bonnicksen; George Grandpre; Tom Ray
- Layouts by: Robert Gribbroek
- Backgrounds by: Bob Singer
- Color process: Technicolor
- Production company: Warner Bros. Cartoons
- Distributed by: Warner Bros. Pictures
- Release date: August 20, 1960
- Running time: 7 minutes
- Language: English

Mice Follies is a 1960 Warner Bros. Looney Tunes cartoon directed by Robert McKimson. The short was released on August 20, 1960. It was the third and last of McKimson's parodies of Jackie Gleason's The Honeymooners, following The Honey-Mousers (1956) and Cheese It, the Cat! (1957).

== Plot ==
Ralph Crumden and Ned Morton are walking home from the Raccoon Lodge at two o'clock in the morning. Ned stops to lasso a cat, but when Ralph grabs the cord, he gets dragged in and pounded by the cat.

The cat enters the house next to Ralph's house, waiting for a chance to grab the mice. The cat puts his mouth against the mouse hole so that Ralph and Ned enter the cat's body. Ralph lights a match in the darkness, making smoke, Ned thinks the "place" is a barbeque ribs joint, and the cat regurgitates the mice. The mice walk on, thinking they entered the wrong place. The cat goes into Ralph's house through a grate. Ralph and Ned cautiously enter the house, thinking their wives are sleeping soundly. Ralph greets "Alice" and grabs her new fur coat, ripping a piece of fur off the cat. In response, the cat slices Ralph. Ned tries to talk with "Trixie", but the cat massacres Ned. Both mice march in to confront their "wives." However, the cat beats them up and the two mice go to sleep at the park to get away from their "aggressive wives".

Alice and Trixie return from the movies to Ralph's house cautiously entering, but the cat beats them up as well. Both ladies go to sleep at the park to get away from their "aggressive husbands". However, unknown to them, their husbands are asleep on the other side of the same bench.

== Home media ==
The short is included as an extra on Looney Tunes Mouse Chronicles: The Chuck Jones Collection. It was later released in a higher quality restoration on Looney Tunes Collector's Vault: Volume 3.
