= A Witch's Tangled Hare =

- Lobby card
- Directed by: Abe Levitow
- Story by: Michael Maltese
- Starring: Mel Blanc (all other voices); June Foray (Witch Hazel - uncredited)
- Edited by: Treg Brown
- Music by: Milt Franklyn
- Animation by: Keith Darling; Ken Harris; Ben Washam; Richard Thompson
- Layouts by: Owen Fitzgerald
- Backgrounds by: Bob Singer
- Color process: Technicolor
- Production company: Warner Bros. Cartoons
- Distributed by: Warner Bros. Pictures; The Vitaphone Corporation
- Release date: October 31, 1959 (US)
- Running time: 6:23
- Language: English

A Witch's Tangled Hare is a 1959 Warner Bros. Looney Tunes theatrical cartoon short directed by Abe Levitow. The short was released on Halloween of 1959, and stars Bugs Bunny. Mel Blanc provides the voices for Bugs Bunny and Sam Crubish, while an uncredited June Foray voices Witch Hazel. The cartoon makes a number of references to various plays written by William Shakespeare (including Hamlet, Macbeth, Romeo and Juliet, and As You Like It).

== Plot ==
The cartoon opens with a writer, who looks similar to William Shakespeare, coming across a castle with a mailbox with "Macbeth" written on it. At this, he begins to write a play based on this title. He hears the loud screeching laugh of Witch Hazel and watches her stir her cauldron. The witch has Bugs Bunny sleeping on a platter and wakes him up. He believes the cauldron to be a bath and readily climbs in, only realizing his mistake after reading her open recipe book. Bugs quickly jumps out of the boiling cauldron and first angrily confronts, then runs away from Witch Hazel towards the castle when she tries to attack him with a meat cleaver. Witch Hazel pursues Bugs Bunny on her flying broomstick. We then see the poet again trying to write after Bugs and the witch have departed.

At the castle, Witch Hazel and Bugs run into each other and they have a little laughing contest, then Bugs runs up a tall tower, saying "You hoo! Granny! Here I am!" and Witch Hazel says after that "And here I come!" while she is on her broomstick, but it goes backwards; Witch Hazel then says "Oh we women drivers! I had the silly thing in reverse!" Then she flies up to the tower, saying in baby talk "Hello", where Bugs gives her a heavy weight and says, "Good-bye!" As the witch falls down with it, she cries out "Good grief!" then Bugs says, "Good riddance!" She crashes to the ground with her broom destroyed and the chase continues. Bugs acts as Romeo to try to trick Witch Hazel, who starts to quote Juliet's lines from the play, but soon the two improvise. Witch Hazel jumps out of the castle window as Bugs pretends that he will catch her and instead rapidly runs off.

As Bugs runs out from the castle he runs into the poet, who is crying because he says that he will never be a writer. Bugs finds out that he is not William Shakespeare, but is actually called Sam Crubish. Witch Hazel hears this and it appears that the two know each other, but have not seen each other in a while because Crubish never showed up to meet her family at what Crubish incorrectly thought was Apartment 2B. Sam and Witch Hazel leave talking about who made the mistake of saying "2B" and the cartoon closes with Bugs Bunny quoting the famous line from Hamlet – "To be, or not to be, that is the question."

== Additional crew members ==
- Layout Artist: Owen Fitzgerald
- Visual Backgrounds: Bob Singer
- Film Editor: Treg Brown

== See also ==
- List of films about witchcraft

Preceded by Bonanza Bunny	Bugs Bunny Cartoons; 1959	Succeeded by People Are Bunny
