= Backwoods Bunny =

1959 film

- Title card
- Directed by: Robert McKimson
- Story by: Tedd Pierce
- Starring: Mel Blanc; Daws Butler (uncredited)
- Edited by: Treg Brown
- Music by: Milt Franklyn
- Animation by: Warren Batchelder; Tom Ray; George Grandpré; Ted Bonnicksen
- Layouts by: Robert Gribbroek
- Backgrounds by: William Butler
- Color process: Technicolor
- Production company: Warner Bros. Cartoons
- Distributed by: Warner Bros. Pictures
- Release date: June 13, 1959
- Running time: 7 min
- Language: English

Backwoods Bunny is a 1959 Warner Bros. Merrie Melodies cartoon, directed by Robert McKimson and written by Tedd Pierce. The short was released on June 13, 1959, and stars Bugs Bunny.

== Plot ==
Bugs Bunny embarks on a vacation in the rustic setting of the Ozarks, encountering a simple abode perched atop a tall tree inhabited by a rural buzzard named Elvis and his Pa. Upon spotting Bugs, Elvis attempts to entice him with a carrot, but Bugs cleverly outwits him by utilizing a water hose disguised as his hand. This leads to a comical exchange where Bugs manipulates the water flow, causing Elvis to inadvertently launch himself between trees until he falls to the ground.

Subsequently, Elvis, now armed with a rifle, mistakenly believes Bugs to be a threat and attempts to shoot him, only to miss. Further antics ensue as Bugs deceives Elvis by masquerading as a female hillbilly, leading to a brief moment of confusion before Elvis realizes the ruse and resumes his pursuit of Bugs.

A confrontation unfolds as Elvis tries to coerce Bugs out of his rabbit hole with threats of gunfire. Bugs ingeniously redirects Elvis's attention to his father, who is lounging nearby. In a misguided attempt to comply with Elvis's demand, the father buzzard becomes the unintended target of Elvis's gunfire, as Bugs orchestrates a series of comedic mishaps.

The scene culminates in a surreal sequence where Bugs, clad in golf attire, serenades the chaos to the tune of "I'm Looking Over a Four Leaf Clover" punctuated by gunfire-induced interruptions.

== Music ==
- "I'm Looking Over a Four-Leaf Clover", (uncredited). Music by Harry M. Woods, Lyrics by Mort Dixon
- "Arkansas Traveler", (uncredited). Music by Sanford Faulkner
- "Oh, You Beautiful Doll", (uncredited). Music by Nat Ayer

Preceded by Apes of Wrath	Bugs Bunny Cartoons; 1959	Succeeded by Wild and Woolly Hare
