= Apes of Wrath =

1959 film

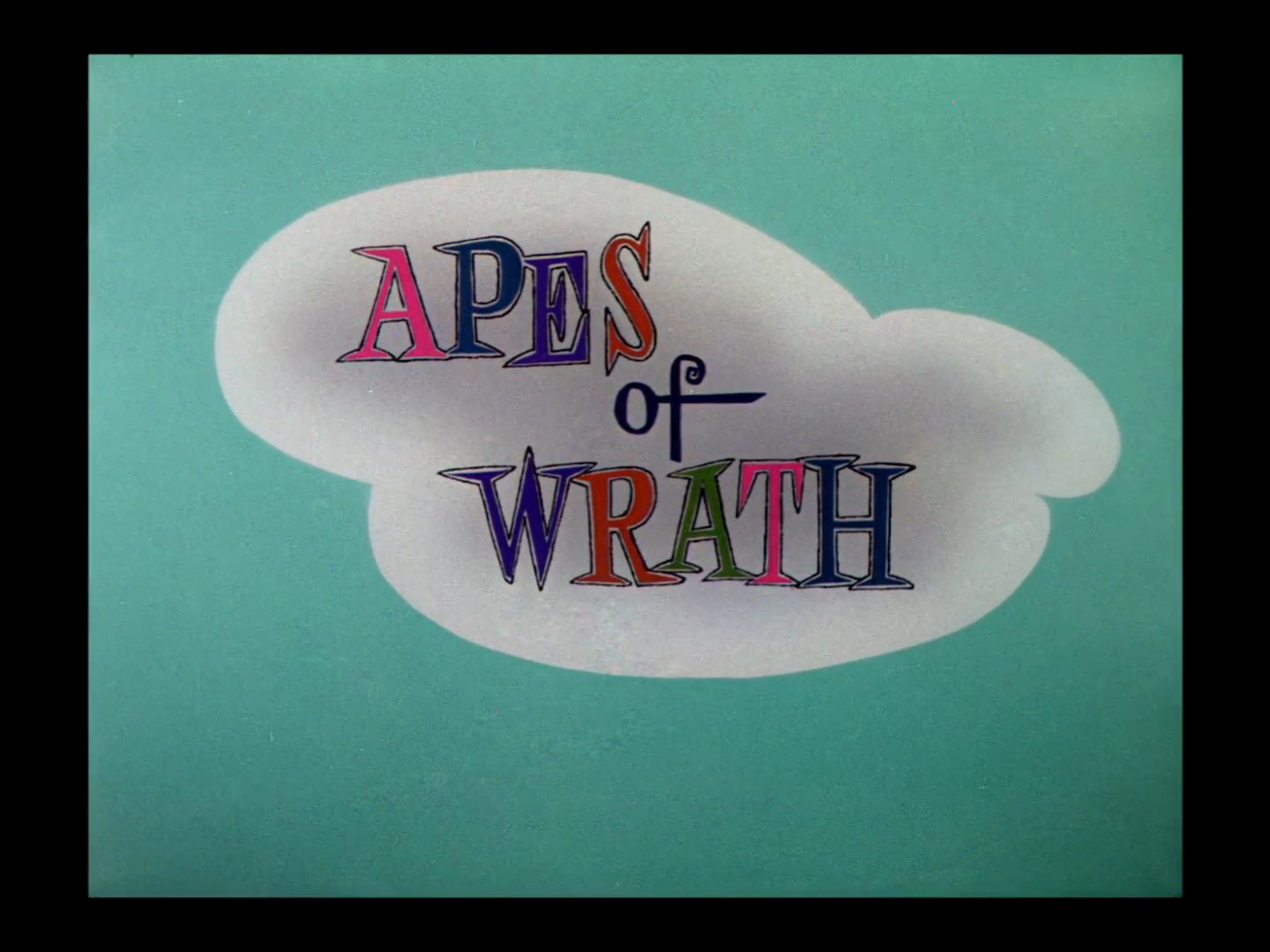
- Title card
- Directed by: Friz Freleng
- Story by: Warren Foster
- Starring: Mel Blanc; June Foray
- Edited by: Treg Brown
- Music by: Milt Franklyn
- Animation by: Arthur Davis; Virgil Ross; Gerry Chiniquy
- Layouts by: Hawley Pratt
- Backgrounds by: Tom O'Loughlin
- Color process: Technicolor
- Production company: Warner Bros. Cartoons
- Distributed by: Warner Bros. Pictures; The Vitaphone Corporation
- Release date: April 18, 1959
- Running time: 6:28

Apes of Wrath is a 1959 Warner Bros. Merrie Melodies animated short directed by Friz Freleng. The short was released on April 18, 1959, and stars Bugs Bunny with a cameo from Daffy Duck at the end. This cartoon recycles the plot from the 1948 cartoon Gorilla My Dreams. The title is a parody of John Steinbeck's novel The Grapes of Wrath.

This cartoon was featured in Bugs Bunny's 3rd Movie: 1001 Rabbit Tales, but with a few slight changes, since the plot features Bugs and Daffy trying to sell books.

== Plot ==
An inebriated stork, tasked with delivering a baby gorilla in the jungle, loses the infant during a break. Fearing repercussions, the stork seeks a replacement and spots Bugs Bunny roasting a carrot and singing. He knocks Bugs out, dresses him in baby clothes, and delivers him to the gorilla parents. The parents, "Mama" and Elvis, are horrified upon seeing the "baby." Elvis tries to club him, but Mama insists that they accept him whatever he looks like. As Bugs awakens Mama offers him to Elvis for a kiss. When Elvis roars instead, Mama hits him with a rolling pin, and Bugs decides to play the situation for fun.

Elvis is forced to care for Bugs but continues trying to get rid of him, while Bugs takes every chance to get him in trouble with Mama and her rolling pin. Eventually the stork returns and gives Mama their real baby. Upon hearing this, Bugs runs for his life from an enraged Elvis. As Elvis prepares to drop a boulder on Bugs from a cliff, the bunny sees Mama approach. He runs away and the boulder hits Mama instead. Elvis stammers an explanation before accepting his punishment. As Bugs watches, the stork congratulates him and hands him a bundle. Daffy Duck leaps out, calls Bugs "dearest mommy," and kisses him as he frowns to the audience.

| Preceded by Hare-Abian Nights | Bugs Bunny Cartoons; 1959 | Succeeded by Backwoods Bunny |
