= Odor of the Day =

- Directed by: Arthur Davis
- Story by: Lloyd Turner
- Starring: Mel Blanc
- Music by: Carl Stalling
- Animation by: Don Williams; Emery Hawkins; Basil Davidovich; J.C. Melendez
- Layouts by: Don Smith
- Backgrounds by: Philip De Guard
- Color process: Technicolor (production); Cinecolor (release)
- Production company: Warner Bros. Cartoons
- Distributed by: Warner Bros. Pictures
- Release date: October 2, 1948
- Running time: 7 min (one reel)
- Country: United States
- Language: English

Odor of the Day is a 1948 Warner Bros. Looney Tunes cartoon directed by Arthur Davis. The short was released on October 2, 1948, and stars Pepé Le Pew.

It is the only short in which he does not appear as a lover; it is also the only short in which he does not speak, save for one line at the end. This is also the second and last cartoon to feature Davis' character, Wellington the Dog, who previously appeared in Doggone Cats the year prior.

The title is a play on the phrase "order of the day".

== Plot ==
On a cold winter day, Wellington the Dog desperately seeks shelter; he tries to do so in a dog house, a hawk's nest and a turtle shell, but is rejected every time (the dog house was already occupied by another dog who sticks up a "No Vacancy" sign, the hawk doesn't take kindly to the dog being in his nest, and the turtle - who resembles Cecil Turtle - is merely annoyed by the dog trying to hide in his shell). He finally stumbles upon the home of Pepé Le Pew, who is currently out. When he returns, Wellington unsuccessfully tries to get rid of the skunk. Pepé grabs his own tail, aims, and focuses his odorous spray his tail's tip: blasting it at the dog in repetitive rounds as if firing a machine gun. The overpowering stench forces Wellington out into the snow again, and when he falls into the pool of ice water the turtle was previously in, he finds himself frozen in a block of ice when Pepé gets him out. As soon as Pepé frees the dog from the block, Wellington catches a cold.

Pepé wants his home back and tries in vain to make Wellington go away with his stench. However, thanks to his cold, the dog can't smell a thing. After being forced out, Pepé throws him a note which reads: "WARNING! A COLD CAN BE FATAL! SEE YOUR DOCTOR NOW!". Wellington hurriedly phones his doctor, Dr. Gazunthett, at SL-4361 (other doctors listed include Dr. Zilch, Dr. Szyklmno, Dr. Kildare, Dr. Schill, Dr. Schnook, and Dr. McStein), and Pepé promptly appears in disguise as the doctor. He tries putting a mustard plaster on the dog's nose and ripping it off, which doesn't work. Pepé next tries a steam machine, which after several tries, works, ridding Wellington of his cold. Pepé now successfully gets rid of his unwanted guest with his stench.

Wellington jumps back into the icy water and after he returns frozen in a block of ice and thaws himself out in the fireplace, his cold returns. Pepé tries to get rid of him again with his smell, but fails. Wellington then goes over to get a bottle of perfume and sprays it over himself and Pepé. Unable to stand the smell of perfume, Pepé runs off outside, jumps into the icy water and returns to thaw himself out in the fireplace, at which point he catches a cold himself. The pair finally agree to live with the colds and each other since neither can get rid of the other, and as they sneeze, they both say "Gesundheit!"
