= The Swooner Crooner =

- Blue Ribbon reissue title card
- Directed by: Frank Tashlin
- Story by: Warren Foster
- Produced by: Leon Schlesinger
- Starring: Mel Blanc (unc.); Richard Bickenbach (unc.); Gil Turner (unc.); Sam Glasser (unc.); Sara Berner (unc.); Bea Benaderet (unc.)
- Music by: Carl W. Stalling
- Animation by: George Cannata; Uncredited animators: I. Ellis; Cal Dalton; Arthur Davis
- Backgrounds by: Richard H. Thomas (unc.)
- Color process: Technicolor
- Production company: Leon Schlesinger Productions
- Distributed by: Warner Bros. Pictures
- Release date: May 6, 1944
- Running time: 7:21
- Country: United States
- Language: English

The Swooner Crooner is a 1944 Warner Bros. Looney Tunes cartoon directed by Frank Tashlin. The short was released on May 6, 1944, and stars Porky Pig.

The cartoon was nominated for the 1944 Academy Award for Best Short Subject (Cartoons), but lost to the Tom and Jerry cartoon Mouse Trouble.

== Plot ==
Porky Pig is the supervisor of the Flockheed Eggcraft Factory, where dozens of hens lay eggs for the war effort (in this case, World War II). The hens suddenly get distracted from their egg laying when a handsome rooster (who resembles and sings like Frank Sinatra) is heard singing outside. Frankie's renditions of "It Can't Be Wrong" by Dick Haymes and "As Time Goes By" (from Casablanca, 1942) causes all the hens to refuse to lay eggs because they are too busy swooning.

When egg production comes to a halt, Porky rushes to investigate and finds all the roosts empty; all the hens have gone to listen to Frankie. Soon, he is auditioning for a crooner of his own to start production up again; showing up are rooster caricatures of Vaughn Monroe ("Shortnin' Bread"), Al Jolson ("September in the Rain"), Jimmy Durante ("Lullaby of Broadway") and Cab Calloway ("Blues in the Night"), none of whom apparently work out.

Porky is on the point of despair when a Bing Crosby rooster (who introduces himself as "The Old Groaner") shows up and provokes a competition with Frankie ("When My Dream Boat Comes Home", "I'll Pray for You", "Trade Winds", "Always in My Heart", "You Must Have Been a Beautiful Baby"). Between the two of them, the overexcited hens' egg production shoots to a level beyond what Porky can handle, including a just-hatched hen chick laying an egg many times her own size.

Surveying literal hills and mountains of eggs all over his farm, Porky is impressed and asks the two roosters, "How did you ever m-m-make 'em lay all those eggs?" The roosters demonstrate their technique, crooning at Porky who, as a result lays a mountain of eggs.

== Cast ==
- Mel Blanc - Porky Pig
- Richard Bickenbach - Frankie
- Gil Turner - Bing
- Sam Glasser - Al Jolson rooster, Jimmy Durante rooster, Cab Calloway rooster, Vaughn Monroe rooster
- Sara Berner and Bea Benaderet - Hens

== Home media ==
- VHS - Bugs & Daffy: The Wartime Cartoons
- VHS - Cartoon Festival Featuring "Nothing But The Tooth"
- VHS - The Golden Age of Looney Tunes, Volume 9
- LaserDisc - The Golden Age of Looney Tunes, Volume 1, Side 9
- DVD - Looney Tunes Golden Collection: Volume 3, Disc 2
- DVD - Warner Bros. Home Entertainment Academy Awards Animation Collection, Disc 2
- DVD/Blu-ray - Looney Tunes Platinum Collection: Volume 3, Disc 2

== Production notes ==
- The cartoon is the first Looney Tunes entry to be re-released into the Blue Ribbon program. It was re-released as Swooner Crooner on February 12, 1949 with the original opening, credits, and closing titles replaced. The original film was found but remains inaccessible.
- This is the only Blue Ribbon re-release as a Looney Tunes short to keep the original Porky Pig drum ending audio. The original ending audio was later replaced with the 1995 Turner print, which changed it to the 1941-55 rendition of Merrily We Roll Along, which the DVD and Blu-ray sets use as the source of the soundtrack. Later Looney Tunes re-releases that originally had the Porky Pig drum ending would have their ending audio changed to the 1941-55 rendition of Merrily We Roll Along by default.
- This is also the only Blue Ribbon Looney Tunes short that was re-released with the byline "IN TECHNICOLOR". The rest of the Looney Tunes re-released were re-released with the byline "Color by TECHNICOLOR".

== See also ==
- List of World War II short films
- Porky Pig filmography
- Looney Tunes and Merrie Melodies filmography (1940–1949)
