= Wild and Woolly Hare =

- Lobby card
- Directed by: Friz Freleng
- Story by: Warren Foster
- Starring: Mel Blanc
- Edited by: Treg Brown
- Music by: Milt Franklyn
- Animation by: Virgil Ross; Gerry Chiniquy; Art Davis
- Layouts by: Hawley Pratt
- Backgrounds by: Tom O'Loughlin
- Color process: Technicolor
- Production company: Warner Bros. Cartoons
- Distributed by: Warner Bros. Pictures; The Vitaphone Corporation
- Release date: August 1, 1959 (US)
- Running time: 7 minutes
- Language: English

Wild and Woolly Hare is a 1959 American animated Western comedy short film directed by Friz Freleng and written by Warren Foster. The short was released on August 1, 1959 by Warner Bros. Pictures as part of the Looney Tunes series, and features Bugs Bunny and Yosemite Sam.

== Plot ==
The short opens in the town of Canasta Flats in 1889, panning past the Last Chance Saloon and the Next to the Last Chance Saloon and into the Fat Chance Saloon, where the patrons hang out. A mustached cowboy tells his friend that he hears that Yosemite Sam is in town, which causes his friend to flee stating an excuse about leaving a cake in the oven. A card-playing cowboy tells his friend that Yosemite Sam is swinging his fastest gun of the West, to which Injun Joe replies that that is because Yosemite Sam has never met him. When Yosemite Sam is spotted approaching the saloon, Injun Joe goes out to have a showdown with him, only to be instantly shot off-screen (with a customer gulping down the beer Injun Joe handed him to hold).

Yosemite Sam enters the saloon and states who he is, until he gets interrupted by a voice yelling "Ah, shaddap!" Sam comes up to the pink shirt cowboy who stayed and demands to know if he just told him to shut up. The cowboy reveals himself to be Bugs Bunny, who repeats that he did indeed say it. When Sam tells Bugs that his backtalk has led him to a duel, Sam then warns Bugs he will get shot and that he is a sharpshooter, but Bugs informs Sam he is one as well. To prove it, he tells Sam a shot that he is good at and fires a bullet that ricochets off various objects before parting Sam's hair down the middle. After Sam sees the bullet come in, he ducks and tells Bugs that he missed, but when Bugs tells him to wait, Sam's hat falls off in half, revealing his parted hair.

Unimpressed at this skill of sharp shooting, Sam shows Bugs some "real" shooting by tossing a can in the air and shooting it full of holes. To top it, Bugs tosses the same can up, but shoots Sam in the face instead. When Sam threatens to blast Bugs for that "accident," Bugs suggests that they settle things "in a gentleman-like manner", which Sam agrees to even though it is against his principles.

They begin the typical ten-pace and fire, only with Bugs going the same way Sam does, when Sam cheats on the count of ten. Sam turns to fire, but fires directly past Bugs, who then kisses him on the nose. After Bugs moves in front of Sam again, Sam calls off the "Gentlemen's Duel" and forces Bugs to fight "dirty", so they each go to opposite ends of a bar shooting at each other. As Sam goes to one end, Bugs blasts him in the face, and when Sam tries to return, Bugs outruns and blasts him again. Their fight is interrupted when Sam hears a train whistle. Checking his watch and seeing it is 5:15, he tells Bugs that he is abandoning the gunfight so that he can catch and rob the train.

Just as Sam hops aboard his horse and rides off after the train, Bugs follows on another horse. Sam orders Bugs at gunpoint to retreat so he can rob it, but Bugs vows that he is going to save it. Right after Bugs hops aboard the engine's cab of the train (switching his cowboy hat with a train engineer's cap), Sam orders Bugs back at the count of five. Just as Sam reaches four, his horse makes him hit a telegraph pole. When Sam catches up again and tries counting to three, but when he gets to two, he runs into the wall of a tunnel. He catches up again and tries just counting two, but when he reaches two, he and his horse fall off a trestle bridge and into a river below.

Undeterred, Sam manages to ride on ahead of Bugs and boards another locomotive to hit Bugs' green-painted 4-4-0 American type steam engine with a tender (#791). Thinking this will make Bugs stop, Sam calls out to Bugs to stop his train because he has got one of his own (a tenderless 4-2-0 red locomotive, #99), but Bugs calls out to Sam to stop his train. Both openly state that neither will stop their train unless the other stops his first. Thinking Bugs wants to play dirty, Sam tells Bugs they will see who stops their train first when they crash and advances the regulator in his locomotive. Bugs accepts this duel and advances the regulator on his engine as well. As both trains rush towards each other head on, Sam keeps a stern face while Bugs remains calm. Almost to collision, Sam panics and repeatedly blows his locomotive's whistle before resorting to duck down to wait for the crash. Bugs, however, extends the "legs" on the cars of his train so that Sam's passes harmlessly underneath. Just as Sam gets up and wonders why there was no crash, he spots a sign reading "End of Line", and his train falls off an unfinished trestle bridge and into a lake below.

With his enemy defeated, Bugs calls out a goodbye to Sam and drives off ("So long, screwy, see ya in Saint Louie!"). The final shot shows Sam's locomotive, up to its smokestack in the lake, with a soot-covered Sam poking out and admitting to the audience: "I hate that rabbit!"

== See also ==
- List of American films of 1959
- Hare Trigger—the debut of Yosemite Sam
- Bugs Bunny Rides Again—another Bugs-Sam collaboration

Preceded by Backwoods Bunny	Bugs Bunny Cartoons; 1959	Succeeded by Bonanza Bunny
