= Hare Trigger =

1945 film by Friz Freleng

- Lobby card
- Directed by: I. Freleng
- Story by: Michael Maltese
- Starring: Mel Blanc
- Music by: Carl W. Stalling
- Animation by: Manuel Perez; Ken Champin; Virgil Ross; Gerry Chiniquy
- Layouts by: Hawley Pratt
- Backgrounds by: Paul Julian
- Color process: Technicolor
- Production company: Warner Bros. Cartoons
- Distributed by: Warner Bros. Pictures; The Vitaphone Corporation
- Release date: May 5, 1945
- Running time: 8 minutes
- Country: United States
- Language: English

Hare Trigger is a 1945 Merrie Melodies cartoon directed by Friz Freleng. The cartoon was released on May 5, 1945, and features Bugs Bunny. The short featured the first appearance of Yosemite Sam, as well as the first short to feature the expanded credit format (previously, shorts credited the director, one animator, writer, musical director and sometimes the voice actor).

This short is also the first to use the shortened version of "Merrily We Roll Along" that played from 1945 to 1955. The title is a play on "hair trigger", referring to any weapon or other device with a sensitive trigger.

== Plot ==
After opening credits underscored by a lively instrumental of "Cheyenne", an old-fashioned 2-4-0 train is seen rolling along through the desert. It passes another train going around a utility pole, and voices are heard repeating "Bread and Butter" with the engine blowing its whistle to the tune "Yankee Doodle".

Bugs is riding in the mail car of a train, singing a nonsense song called "Go Get the Axe", when a pint-sized bandit attempts to rob the train (with the underscore playing the Erlkönig), only to have it pass clear over his head. He then calls for his horse, which he needs a rolling step-stair to mount. He catches up and boards the train and begins to rob it while the mail clerk wraps himself in a package marked DON'T OPEN 'TIL XMAS. The bandit accidentally throws Bugs Bunny in his sack. Bugs assumes that he is Jesse James. The bandit scoffs and tells him (and the audience), "I'm Yosemite Sam, the meanest, toughest, rip-roarin'-est, Edward Everett Horton-est hombre that ever packed a six-shooter!" (This pattern of Sam introducing himself to Bugs and the audience continued in other cartoons.) Bugs tells Sam that there is another tough guy in the train packing a "seven-shooter", and Sam goes looking for him – and it turns out to be Bugs in disguise.

Various fights ensue, as each character temporarily gets the upper hand for a while. In one scene, Bugs dumps red ink on Sam, causing him to think he has been shot; he collapses (while Bugs sings "O Bury Me Not on the Lone Prairie") but eventually realizes the red liquid is only ink. Sam pushes his face furiously into Bugs', then pulls back and with a quiet, offended tone asks, "Why did you pour ink on mah haid?" After another skirmish, Bugs tricks Sam into dashing into a lounge car in which a horrific fight is occurring. (Stock film footage of a stereotypical western saloon fight, taken from the Warner Bros. Western film Dodge City, was used here.) With the sounds of crashes and bangs in the background, Bugs calmly sings "Sweet Georgia Brown" to himself. Sam emerges tottering, banged and bruised, to a comical instrumental of "Rally 'Round the Flag". Bugs, affecting the stereotyped voice of an African-American train porter, persuades the dazed Sam that he is supposed to disembark the train, piling him up with luggage; Sam even hands Bugs a silver coin as a tip, and Bugs says, "Thank you, suh!" As Sam steps off the moving train, the mail-drop hook grabs him and temporarily whisks him off the train. Bugs thinks he has vanquished Sam, and yells, "So long, screwy, see ya in Saint Louie!" a line that will be echoed in Wild and Woolly Hare and A Feather in His Hare. But Sam gets back on board somehow. Bugs and Sam start a fight on top of the passenger carriages.

Finally, Sam has Bugs tied up, dangling from a rope, weighted down by an anvil, and fiendishly cutting through the rope, while the train is passing over a gorge. ("Now, ya lop-eared polecat, try and get out of this one!") The screen fills with the words the narrator (Mel Blanc, in close to his natural voice) is saying, "Is this the end of Bugs Bunny? Will our hero be dashed to bits on the jagged rocks below?". Then Bugs walks across the screen, dressed in top hat and tails, carrying a bag full of gold (reward money), and dragging the now tied-up Sam behind him, mocking the on-screen words ("Is he to be doomed to utter destruction? Will he be rendered non compos mentis?"). Bugs closes by turning to the audience and repeating a popular radio catchphrase from Red Skelton's "Mean Widdle Kid": "He don't know me vewy well, do he?" as a bar of "Kingdom Coming" plays on the track at iris-out.

== Cast ==
- Mel Blanc as Bugs Bunny, Yosemite Sam

== Home media ==
Hare Trigger is available on Looney Tunes Golden Collection: Volume 6 and Looney Tunes Collector's Vault: Volume 1.

== See also ==
- Looney Tunes and Merrie Melodies filmography (1940–1949)
- Bugs Bunny filmography
- Yosemite Sam filmography

== Notes ==
- "Hare Trigger" contains the first appearance of Yosemite Sam, who would go on to be one of Bugs Bunny's most frequent rivals, after Elmer Fudd and (later) Daffy Duck. Freleng created Yosemite Sam because he thought Elmer Fudd was too stupid and soft and he needed a smarter and tougher foe for Bugs.

Preceded by The Unruly Hare	Bugs Bunny Cartoons; 1945	Succeeded by Hare Conditioned
