= The Scared Crows =

- Directed by: Dave Fleischer
- Produced by: Max Fleischer
- Starring: Margie Hines
- Animation by: Dave Tendlar; William Sturm
- Color process: Black-and-white
- Production company: Fleischer Studios
- Distributed by: Paramount Pictures
- Release date: June 9, 1939
- Running time: 6 minutes
- Language: English

The Scared Crows is a 1939 Fleischer Studios animated short film starring Betty Boop.

== Plot ==
Betty Boop tries some spring planting, but the crows spoil everything so she makes herself a scarecrow and shoos off the birds but during the process a crow is injured, as it hits a tree. Betty picks the crow up and puts him into a basket. She asks Pudgy to take care of him. But soon Pudgy grows sleepy and goes off to sleep. When the crow is left unguarded it became conscious and calls the rest of his herd in to a house for a "party" as soon as Pudgy is woken up by one of the crows (who threw an eaten apple). Everything is in a mess. The crows try to make fun of Pudgy and try many ways to get him out. In the end, they take a blanket, wrap it around pudgy and throw him out of the house via the door. Pudgy warns Betty about the crows in the house. The crows then us eggs and berries as ammunition. As she is running away from the crows, Betty trips against the scarecrow that she made earlier and gets an idea. She dressed up as the scarecrow herself and scare them off eventually.
