= Hare Conditioned =

- Directed by: Charles M. Jones
- Story by: Tedd Pierce
- Starring: Mel Blanc; Dave Barry
- Music by: Carl W. Stalling
- Animation by: Ken Harris; Ben Washam; Basil Davidovich; Lloyd Vaughan
- Layouts by: Earl Klein
- Backgrounds by: Robert Gribbroek
- Color process: Technicolor
- Production company: Warner Bros. Cartoons
- Distributed by: Warner Bros. Pictures; The Vitaphone Corporation
- Release date: August 11, 1945
- Running time: 7:15
- Language: English

Hare Conditioned is a 1945 Warner Bros. cartoon in the Looney Tunes series. It was directed by Chuck Jones and features Bugs Bunny.

== Plot ==
Bugs Bunny is revealed to be on display in the "Stacey's Department Store" window (a spoof of Macy's), helping to advertise camping gear. After closing time, Bugs retires to have a well-earned carrot. The store manager appears and informs Bugs that since the summer sale's over, he is being transferred to another department, which Bugs puzzles over ("tax-e-doi-me?"). The man tells the rabbit that he will look splendid... after he has been "stuffed". Right after Bugs does what he thinks could be a suitable pose, he ponders this for a second. Upon realizing that the manager intends to cut him open to be "stuffed," Bugs screams and begins a cartoon-long chase.

The manager then chases Bugs into the jewelry department with a gun and fires when he catches sight of Bugs' ears sticking up from a counter. Bugs moves his ears so the bullets miss, but seems to raise his hands in surrender. As the manager gloats that he'll finish Bugs off, Bugs pops out from behind the counter (revealing that the raised hands were just a pair of gloves on the tips of his ears), armed with a gun as well, and states he'll finish off the manager. He pulls the trigger, to which the gun sticks out three "bang" signs, prompting the manager to stick three "ouch" signs out of his mouth.

When the manager laughs that he outsmarted Bugs, Bugs distracts him, saying that he sounds "just like that guy on the radio: The Great Gildersneeze!" The manager gushes over this comment, and Bugs swipes the gun away, making it go off in the process. The manager demands to know if Bugs had been trying to outsmart him, to which Bugs innocently states that he just did and gives the manager a wacky kiss on the nose.

The manager then chases after Bugs into the ladies' department, where he sees a customer (Bugs in Drag). Bugs asks for a pair of bedroom slippers, to which the gushy manager removes Bugs' high heel and tickles his foot. While they are both laughing vigorously, Bugs falls to the floor, revealing that the manager was actually tickling the foot of a mannequin leg, to which Bugs wiggles his real toe and escapes.

The manager then chases Bugs through several departments where they each emerge in the outfit associated with that department (little boys, Turkish baths, costume, sports, lingerie). Bugs then blows his cover when the manager sees Bugs isn't wearing any lingerie.

As Bugs rushes upstairs, the manager gets into the elevator, where Bugs (in disguise again) brings him down. Just as the manager gets wise after exiting, Bugs tricks him into getting aboard another elevator going up, where the manager sees multiple Bugs's thumbing lifts on the elevator on each floor. Just as he comes back down, Bugs shoves the manager out of the elevator, making the manager rush up hundreds of flights of stairs to the top of the building.

Once at the top, Bugs pushes the manager down a shaft with an elevator under repair. Bugs then listens to the manager scream as he crashes to the ground floor, and while he remarks 'What a dope. What a maroon.', the manager, looking worse for wear, zips back up ready to strangle Bugs.

Just when Bugs is about to be captured, he distracts the man again by tricking him into thinking there is a "Frankincense monster" behind him, just like in a good book he just read. When he looks behind, Bugs has leaped into position, making a hideous face. The frightened man leaps off the building with another scream. Bugs tut-tuts, then pulls out a mirror, makes the same face to himself, turns to the audience in horror, and then he leaps off the building with a scream, thus ending the cartoon.

== Production notes ==
The Stacey's (pun on Macy's) manager was voiced by Dave Barry except for the line "Now I'll finish you off!", which were voiced by Mel Blanc. His voice was based on Harold Peary's character Dr. Gildersleeve from the radio program The Great Gildersleeve, which was mentioned by Bugs in the middle of the cartoon.

The title is a play on "air conditioned"; before air conditioning became widely used, it was sometimes advertised as incentive for the public to visit department stores, where they could avoid the heat of a hot day and, ideally for the store, make purchases. Hare Conditioned was the second Bugs Bunny cartoon in the Looney Tunes series.

Hare Conditioned uses many of the same limited animation techniques which Jones had previously introduced in The Dover Boys two years prior, including smear frames and sliding backgrounds.

The camping scene, soon revealed to be part of the window display for a department store is an outdoor recreation turned into an illusion. The taxidermy department represents "a more deadly artificial display on nature". Robin L. Murray and Joseph K. Heumann argue that these serve as monuments to a disappearing natural world.

This animated short contains a reference to wartime shortages. Bugs impersonates an elevator operator and introduces the items available on the sixth floor: rubber tires, girdles, nylon hosiery, bobby pins, alarm clocks, bourbon, butter, and other picture postcards. These were indeed rare items during World War II.

Bugs scares the store manager and himself by doing an impersonation of "a horrible Frankincense monster". This serves as an indirect reference to Frankenstein's monster.

== Home media ==
This cartoon was released on Looney Tunes Golden Collection: Volume 2 and Looney Tunes Collector's Vault: Volume 1.

== Sources ==
- Glut, Donald F. (2002), "What's Up, Doc Frankenstein (Jekyll and Fu Manchu)?", The Frankenstein Archive: Essays on the Monster, the Myth, the Movies, and More, McFarland & Company, ISBN 978-0786480692
- Murray, Robin L.; Heumann, Joseph K. (2011), "Introduction: A Foundation for Contemporary Enviro-toons", That's All Folks?: Ecocritical Readings of American Animated Features, University of Nebraska Press, ISBN 978-0803235120
- Picart, Caroline Joan; Smoot, Frank; Blodgett, Jayne (2001), "Hare-Conditioned", The Frankenstein Film Sourcebook, Greenwood Publishing Group, ISBN 978-0313313509
- Shull, Michael S.; Wilt, David E. (2004), "Filmography 1944", Doing Their Bit: Wartime American Animated Short Films, 1939-1945, McFarland & Company, ISBN 978-0786481699

== See also ==
- Bugs Bunny filmography
- Looney Tunes and Merrie Melodies filmography (1940–1949)

Preceded by Hare Trigger	Bugs Bunny Cartoons; 1945	Succeeded by Hare Tonic
