= Bonanza Bunny =

1959 film

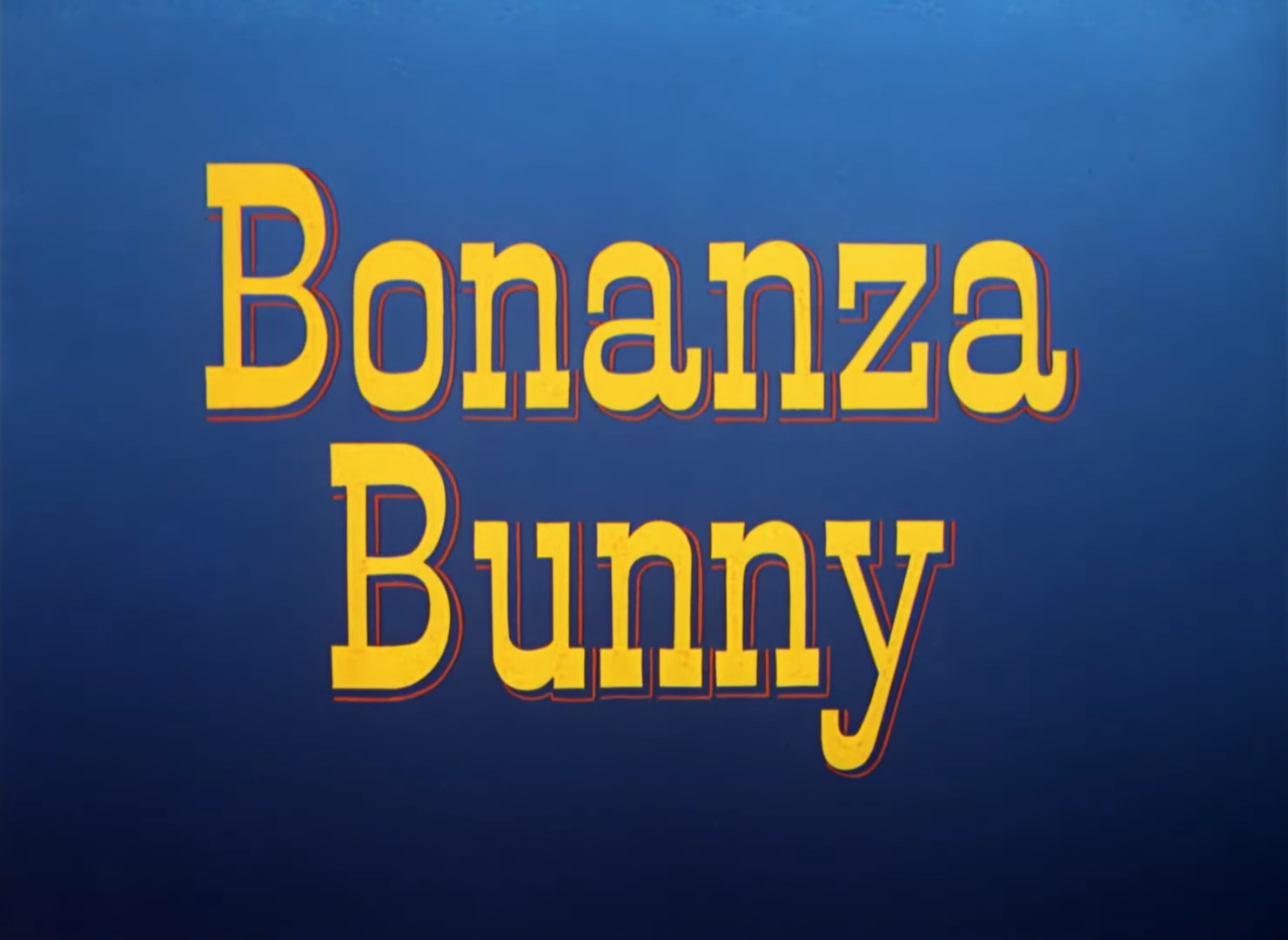
- Title card
- Directed by: Robert McKimson
- Story by: Tedd Pierce
- Starring: Mel Blanc
- Narrated by: Robert C. Bruce
- Edited by: Treg Brown
- Music by: Milt Franklyn
- Animation by: Tom Ray; George Grandpre'; Ted Bonnicksen; Warren Batchelder
- Layouts by: Robert Gribbroek
- Backgrounds by: William Butler
- Color process: Technicolor
- Production company: Warner Bros. Cartoons
- Distributed by: Warner Bros. Pictures
- Release date: September 5, 1959
- Running time: 6:30
- Country: United States
- Language: English

Bonanza Bunny is a 1959 Warner Bros. Merrie Melodies cartoon directed by Robert McKimson. The short was released on September 5, 1959, and stars Bugs Bunny. In the cartoon, Bugs faces off with the French-Canadian claim jumper Blacque Jacque Shellacque during a fictionalized version of the Klondike Gold Rush.

== Plot ==
In 1896, Bugs Bunny walks into a Dawson City saloon with a bag full of gold nuggets. Bugs has no use for them and claims he confused "karats" with carrots. The men in the saloon look suspiciously at Bugs when he requests a glass of carrot juice, and the eager bartender compliments Bugs' stones, one of which Bugs uses to pay him. Bugs is almost shot by Blacque Jacque Shellacque—a villain wanted for "crimes" including claim-jumping, pogo-sticking and square dance calling.

Jacque demands Bugs hand over the gold. When Bugs refuses, Jacque engages Bugs in a game of blackjack; Bugs stands on one card, which turns out to be the "21 of hearts". Having won the hand, Bugs recovers his gold and begins to leave, but is stopped by an enraged Jacque, who claims it is dangerous to cross him. Bugs convinces Jacque there is someone in another room who claims to be twice as dangerous. As Jacque confronts the stranger (Bugs in disguise), the stranger aims a pop gun. Jacque pulls the cork and the gun blasts him in the face. Bugs then pretends to have a phone call for Jacque and says the caller is "Fifi from Montreal." The receiver is a lit stick of dynamite, and when Jacque attempts to answer the dynamite explodes. A dazed Jacque remarks that "Fifi was always a "blast"."

Jacque corners Bugs in a storeroom, holds a pistol to his head and demands the gold. Bugs pretends to cower and "surrenders" the gold. The bag is actually gunpowder that begins to leak out as Jacque makes his getaway while shouting "I'm rich, I'm rich! 90% bracket!" Bugs lights the gunpowder trail, which sets off a large and colorful explosion in the distance. Bugs remarks, "Gee, those Northern Lights are pretty this time of year." He then reveals that his 'gold' was merely rocks painted yellow, and he departs on his husky.

== See also ==
- Bonanza
- List of American films of 1959

Preceded by Wild and Woolly Hare	Bugs Bunny Cartoons; 1959	Succeeded by A Witch's Tangled Hare
