= Hare Tonic =

1945 film by Chuck Jones

- Lobby card
- Directed by: Charles M. Jones
- Story by: Tedd Pierce
- Produced by: Eddie Selzer
- Starring: Mel Blanc; Arthur Q. Bryan
- Music by: Carl W. Stalling
- Animation by: Ken Harris; Basil Davidovich; Lloyd Vaughan; Ben Washam
- Layouts by: Earl Klein
- Backgrounds by: Robert Gribbroek
- Color process: Technicolor
- Production company: Warner Bros. Cartoons
- Distributed by: Warner Bros. Pictures; The Vitaphone Corporation
- Release date: November 10, 1945
- Running time: 8:18
- Country: United States
- Language: English

Hare Tonic is a 1945 Warner Bros. cartoon in the Looney Tunes series, directed by Chuck Jones and written by Tedd Pierce. It stars Bugs Bunny and Elmer Fudd, making this the second cartoon directed by Jones to co-star the two (the first being Elmer's Pet Rabbit). Voice characterizations are by Mel Blanc and Arthur Q. Bryan.

== Plot ==
Elmer Fudd has purchased Bugs Bunny at a local grocery store (with a sign visible in the window offering a special on "Fresh Hare") and is taking him home to make a meal. As he walks along, he sings the tune of "Shortnin' Bread", substituting "Wabbit Stew". Bugs emerges from Elmer's basket, munching on a carrot that was in there with him, and asks, "Eh, whatcha got in the basket, doc?" Elmer replies, "I got me a wabbit! I'm gonna cook me a wabbit stew!" Bugs states his "love" of rabbit stew (despite being a rabbit himself) and then begs to see Elmer's rabbit. When Elmer opens his basket and finds it empty (Bugs had quickly climbed out), Bugs pushes him into his own basket and then sings the tune Elmer had been singing — but then Elmer realizes he has been tricked, and so he reverses the switch.

Once at home, Bugs easily secures his escape by distracting Elmer, tricking him into thinking the phone has rung. However, just as he's about to leave, he decides that the setup's too easy and he just can't leave. He decides to stay and heckle his would-be devourer. Bugs fakes a radio broadcast that warns of the dread disease "rabbititis", which is contracted from rabbits "sold within the last three days" and which causes people to see spots and have "delusions assuming the characteristics of rabbits", which is followed by the onset of schizophrenia and depersonalization disorder. This frightens the gullible Elmer and he informs Bugs that he is free to leave. Bugs, however, decides he doesn't want to leave, reminding Elmer of his stew preparations, only to make Elmer back away, forcing him to hide on top of his door. Bugs, thinking he has B.O., sniffs his glove and tells the audience "Oh, goodness! Don't tell me I offend." just as Elmer pleads with Bugs to scram. Bugs angrily replies as he leaves "Okay! I can take a hint! I know when I'm not wanted! Goodbye!". But when Bugs returns, Elmer reminds him that Bugs has to "scwam", but Bugs points to a new sign on the front door that states "Quarantined for Rabbititus (rabbititis). No one may leave premises."

Thus Bugs stays to torment Elmer, and many hijinks ensue, including Bugs posing as Elmer's shower faucets and a doctor ("Dr. Killpatient", parodying Dr. Kildare), painting a room with red, yellow and blue spots to make Elmer think he sees spots before his eyes and pretending to be Elmer's reflection in the mirror (like the mirror scene in the Marx Brothers' film, Duck Soup) and his own rabbity image reflected at him in a mirror that's really just Bugs after the glass has been removed. When Dr. Killpatient (Bugs) tests Elmer's reflexes, Elmer goes into a familiar Russian kick dance, and Bugs decides to join him in a busby hat and boots. Finally, Elmer sees Bugs' game and chases him out of the house with a shotgun. Bugs quickly halts the chase and, in an unusually lengthy breaking of the fourth wall, even by Bugs' standards, he convinces Elmer that members of the audience are now afflicted with rabbititis, which causes Elmer to flee back into his house in a terror of panic.

Bugs then addresses the audience and says the whole thing was "just a gag, of course" and that if the audience really had rabbititis, they would see swirling red and yellow spots, whereupon red and yellow spots are seen swirling on the screen, and the underscore starts to build dramatically. Immediately after Bugs says, "And then suddenly, everything'd go black!" the screen does suddenly go black, and the music stops abruptly and dramatically, followed by a second or two of dark silence. Bugs snickers and the cartoon ends.

== Production notes ==
Bugs impersonates Frankenstein's monster to chase Elmer.

== Home media ==
This cartoon is found on Volume 3 of the Looney Tunes Golden Collection, and on Volume 1 of the Looney Tunes Platinum Collection.

== See also ==
- Bugs Bunny filmography
- Elmer Fudd filmography
- Looney Tunes and Merrie Melodies filmography (1940–1949)

== Sources ==
- Glut, Donald F. (2002), "What's Up, Doc Frankenstein (Jekyll and Fu Manchu)?", The Frankenstein Archive: Essays on the Monster, the Myth, the Movies, and More, McFarland & Company, ISBN 978-0786480692
- Picart, Caroline Joan; Smoot, Frank; Blodgett, Jayne (2001), "Hare-Conditioned", The Frankenstein Film Sourcebook, Greenwood Publishing Group, ISBN 978-0313313509

Preceded by Hare Conditioned	Bugs Bunny Cartoons; 1945	Succeeded by Baseball Bugs
