= Toy Town Hall =

1936 film by Isadore Freleng

- Directed by: Isadore Freleng
- Produced by: Leon Schlesinger
- Starring: Bernice Hansen; Peter Lind Hayes
- Music by: Carl W. Stalling
- Animation by: Bob McKimson; Sandy Walker
- Color process: Technicolor
- Production company: Leon Schlesinger Productions
- Distributed by: Warner Bros. Productions; The Vitaphone Corporation
- Release date: September 19, 1936
- Running time: 7 min
- Country: United States
- Language: English

Toy Town Hall is a 1936 American animated comedy short film directed by Isadore Freleng. The short was released on September 19, 1936. It is the 64th film in the Merrie Melodies series and the first to be composed by Carl W. Stalling. It is notable for reusing footage from two-strip color Merrie Melodies released between 1934 and 1935.

== Plot ==
A young boy listens to the Ben Bernie Orchestra on the radio, only to be forced to go to sleep by his mother. While he sleeps, his toys come to life and impersonate radio personalities, with commentary provided by a caricature of Fred Allen, a parody of his Town Hall Tonight program. Toys then perform numerous musical numbers, including Eddie Cantor singing "Merrily We Roll Along", as well as a toy plush of Peter Rabbit who sings "My Green Fedora". The boy begrudgingly wakes up as the film ends.

== Sources ==
- Internet Movie Database article
- Big Cartoon Database article
