= Gil Turner (animator) =

American animator

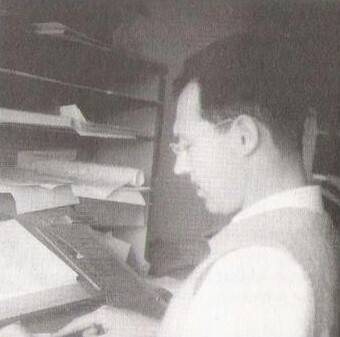
- Born: September 11, 1913; Milwaukee, Wisconsin, U.S.
- Died: March 19, 1967 (aged 53); Los Angeles, California, U.S.
- Occupations: Animator, director, producer, storyboard artist, writer
- Years active: 1933–1967
- Employers: Walt Disney Productions (1933–1937); Jam Handy studio (1937); Leon Schlesinger Productions (1938–1944); MGM (1937–1938, 1944–1953); Carry-Weston (1944-46); Walter Lantz Productions (1953–1956); UPA (1956–1961); Hanna-Barbera (1961–1967); Format Films (1961–1962)

Gilbert H. Turner (September 11, 1913 – March 19, 1967) was an American animator, comic book artist and producer.

== Career ==
He started out working at the Walt Disney Productions animation unit, and eventually moved over to other studios, such as Hugh Harman's and Jam Handy in Detroit, Michigan. He also worked for Leon Schlesinger Productions in Hollywood during World War II and for William Hanna and Joseph Barbera at the Metro-Goldwyn-Mayer cartoon department. He worked for various Hollywood cartoon studios, such as Disney, Warner Bros., MGM, Walter Lantz Productions, UPA, Hanna-Barbera and Format Films. He also drew comic books based on characters from these studios.

== Biography ==
Turner was born in 1913. He worked as an ice cream salesman before starting as an animator at Disney Studios in January 1933. His stay was so brief that no credit known for his work there survived. He joined Harman-Ising Productions a year later, which would eventually evolve into the animation department of Warner Bros. Pictures. After working at Hugh Harman's studio, he moved to work at the studio of Jam Handy in Detroit, Michigan. Despite a short period at Jam Handy's studio, which specialized in industrial and promotional films, he returned to Warners in 1938, where he remained until the mid-1940s, primarily under the direction of Friz Freleng. He worked anonymously on Looney Tunes classics such as The Trial of Mr. Wolf (1941), Rhapsody in Rivets (1941), The Wabbit Who Came to Supper (1942), Fresh Hare, Pigs in a Polka (1943) and Little Red Riding Rabbit (1944).

Around 1948 Turner joined MGM, where he was an animator on Tex Avery's What Price Fleadom? (1948) and a few 'Barney Bear' shorts by Preston Blair and Michael Lah. Between 1953 and 1955 he briefly worked at Walter Lantz' studio on several 'Woody Woodpecker' and 'Chilly Willy' shorts, before joining UPA for an equally brief time as a director/animator on the 'Mr. Magoo' series until the end of the decade. Turner concluded his animation career at the Hanna-Barbera Studios, where he worked on TV series like The Flintstones and Yogi Bear. He also directed several episodes of The Alvin Show for Format Films in the early 1960s before dying in 1967.

Although mainly active in animation, Turner also worked as a comics artist from the mid-1940s on. Together with Jim Davis he worked freelance through the Sangor Shop for companies like Better Publications, Dearfield Comics and American Comics Group ('Little Pancho Vanilla') and funny animal comics for Coo Coo, Giggle, Barnyard and Ha-Ha. At Dell Comics he mainly drew comics based on Warner Brothers characters like 'Bugs Bunny', 'Porky Pig' and 'Sniffles & Mary Jane', followed by stories about the MGM character Barney Bear. During this same period he also scripted 'Barney' comics which were illustrated by Carl Barks. Barks, however, couldn't really identify with the characters and often rewrote dialogue and plot developments to fit his own personality. Eventually he departed from the series, leaving Turner in charge of both text and illustration. One of Turner's innovations was Barney's antagonistic neighbour Mooseface McElk.

Turner was also a regular contributor to Dell's 'Walt Disney's Comics and Stories' from 1947 on, where he was one of the original artists to create stories about the Big Bad Wolf and his good-natured son Lil' Bad Wolf. Colleagues who also drew comics about these wolves around the same time were Carl Buettner, Roger Armstrong, Harvey Eisenberg, Jack Bradbury, Ken Champin and Paul Murry. Turner drew comics starring 'Mickey Mouse', 'Bucky Bug' and 'Dumbo'.

While Turner predominantly drew comics based on characters others created he also had two original newspaper comics of his own, namely 'Trudy' (1947–1948), 'Chico' (1948–1949) published in the teen magazine Cookie and 'Holly Wood' (1950) which could be read in the weekly Redwood Journal from California.

In the 1960s, Turner settled in Los Angeles, where he died in 1967 at the age of 53.

== Résumé ==
- Disney Studios: Animator 1933.
- Warner Bros. Cartoons: Animator 1938–1944 (Looney Tunes and Merrie Melodies).
- Carry-Weston (independent studio with Jack Bradbury a.o.): Educational films for the government. 1944–1946.
- Metro-Goldwyn-Mayer cartoon department: Animator 1934–1936, 1948–1949 (Tex Avery and Barney Bear).
- Walter Lantz Productions: Animator 1953–1956 (Woody Woodpecker, Chilly Willy, Maw and Paw).
- UPA: Animator 1956–1957 and director 1958–1961 (Mr. Magoo).
- Hanna-Barbera: Animator 1961 (Yogi Bear, Snagglepuss).
- Format Films: Director 1961–1962 (The Alvin Show).
- The Man from Button Willow, 1965
- Hanna-Barbera: Storyboard artist 1967 (The Flintstones).
- Comic strips & Illustrations: Editorial Art Syndicate/Sangor Shop: Script and artwork for Standard Comics, American Comics Group and Dearfield Comics 1944–1948 (Homer Hound, Bugsy Bear Family, Ringo, Happy a.o.).
- Script and artwork for his own newspaper strip Chico 1948–1949.
- Western Publishing: Comics artwork for characters from Disney (Li'l Bad Wolf, Mickey Mouse, Bucky Bug, Dumbo), MGM (Barney Bear) and Warner Bros. (Bugs Bunny, Porky Pig) 1947–1957.
