= The Bob Clampett Show =

American animation anthology television series

- Country of origin: United States
- No. of episodes: 26 (list of episodes)

Production
- Executive producers: Mike Lazzo; Keith Crofford
- Producer: Barry Mills
- Running time: 30 minutes

Original release
- Network: Cartoon Network
- Release: May 21, 2000 – March 11, 2001

The Bob Clampett Show is an animated anthology television series which ran from 2000 to 2001. The show features animated theatrical shorts from the Warner Bros. library that were animated or directed by Bob Clampett, as well as a selection of shorts from the Beany and Cecil animated television series. It originally was produced by and aired on Cartoon Network, with reruns airing at the tail end of Cartoon Network's Adult Swim block in the mid-2000s. Twenty-six episodes were made in all.

The show's opening title sequence was nominated for an Annie Award in 2000 in the category "Outstanding Achievement in An Animated Special Project", but it lost to The Scooby-Doo Project.

== Censorship ==
This was one of two animated anthology shows on Cartoon Network (joining The Popeye Show) that aired uncut and uncensored shorts, as well as shorts that would normally get little to no airtime on American TV due to racially insensitive and outdated content (such as Russian Rhapsody and Bacall to Arms), though Kristopher Kolumbus, Jr., the 1938 version of Injun Trouble (ironically, its color remake, Wagon Heels aired), Pilgrim Porky, and the Censored Eleven shorts Coal Black and de Sebben Dwarves and Tin Pan Alley Cats were the only Bob Clampett shorts that never aired on the show; the version of Farm Frolics shown was the Blue Ribbon Merrie Melodies reissue with a missing tobacco spitting joke and a truncated beginning that, as of 2023, was found; and, while there was mention of the violent "director's cut" ending of Hare Ribbin', the version that aired had the general release ending instead.

== Episodes ==
=== Season 1 (2000) ===
All shorts featured this season were produced by Warner Bros. Cartoons.

Episode #	Shorts featured	Original air date
1	Draftee Daffy; Falling Hare; The Timid Toreador	May 21, 2000
2	A Corny Concerto; The Hep Cat; Porky's Hero Agency	May 28, 2000
3	Baby Bottleneck; Buckaroo Bugs; A Tale of Two Kitties	June 18, 2000
4	The Big Snooze; The Cagey Canary; Porky's Last Stand	July 9, 2000
5	The Great Piggy Bank Robbery; Porky in Wackyland; Porky in Egypt	July 16, 2000
6	What's Cookin' Doc?; Porky's Picnic; The Wise Quacking Duck	June 25, 2000
7	Kitty Kornered; Rover's Rival; Wabbit Twouble	July 23, 2000
8	Bugs Bunny Gets the Boid; A Gruesome Twosome; Book Revue	July 30, 2000
9	Tick Tock Tuckered; Wacky Blackout; The Daffy Doc	August 6, 2000
10	Hare Ribbin'; The Lone Stranger and Porky; Porky's Movie Mystery	August 13, 2000
11	Birdy and the Beast; Porky & Daffy; Porky's Tire Trouble	August 20, 2000
12	The Old Grey Hare; Wise Quacks; Porky's Naughty Nephew	September 9, 2000
13	The Wacky Wabbit; What Price Porky; The Bashful Buzzard	September 10, 2000

=== Season 2 (2000–01) ===
This season features a mix between Warner Bros. Cartoons shorts and Beany and Cecil shorts. All Beany & Cecil shorts are marked with an asterisk (*), otherwise all shorts are produced by Warner Bros. Cartoons.

Episode #	Shorts featured	Original air date
14	Tortoise Wins by a Hare; Porky's Poor Fish; The Film Fan	November 26, 2000
15	Wildman of Wildsville*; Porky's Badtime Story; Scalp Trouble	December 3, 2000
16	Horton Hatches the Egg; Naughty Neighbors; Patient Porky	December 17, 2000
17	Beany Meets the Monstrous Monster*; Slap Happy Pappy; Pied Piper Porky	December 31, 2000
18	Russian Rhapsody; The Henpecked Duck; Porky's Poppa	January 7, 2001
19	Wagon Heels; Farm Frolics; Porky's Pooch	January 14, 2001
20	The Spots Off a Leopard*; Porky's Five and Ten; Jeepers Creepers	January 21, 2001
21	An Itch in Time; Porky's Hotel; Eatin' on the Cuff	January 28, 2001
22	Prehistoric Porky; Meet John Doughboy; Chicken Jitters	February 4, 2001
23	Super Cecil*; We, the Animals Squeak!; Nutty News	February 11, 2001
24	Bacall to Arms; Porky's Party; Get Rich Quick Porky	February 18, 2001
25	Goofy Groceries; Polar Pals; The Chewin' Bruin	March 4, 2001
26	Beanyland*; Porky's Snooze Reel; The Sour Puss	March 11, 2001

== See also ==
- Cartoon Alley
- Looney Tunes and Merrie Melodies filmography
- ToonHeads
- The Popeye Show
- The Tex Avery Show
- Toon In with Me
