= The Super Snooper =

1952 film directed by Robert McKimson

- Title card featuring Daffy Duck as "Duck Drake"
- Directed by: Robert McKimson
- Story by: Tedd Pierce
- Starring: Mel Blanc; Marian Richman; Grace Lenard; Ben Frommer; Arthur Q. Bryan
- Music by: Carl Stalling
- Animation by: Herman Cohen; Phil DeLara; Charles McKimson; Rod Scribner; Keith Darling
- Layouts by: Robert Givens
- Backgrounds by: Richard H. Thomas
- Color process: Technicolor
- Production company: Warner Bros. Cartoons
- Distributed by: Warner Bros. Pictures
- Release date: November 1, 1952 (US)
- Running time: 7:09
- Country: United States
- Language: English

The Super Snooper is a 1952 Warner Bros. Looney Tunes cartoon directed by Robert McKimson. The cartoon was released on November 1, 1952, and stars Daffy Duck as a detective.

== Plot ==
Daffy Duck is Duck Drake, a private investigator with a peculiar moniker. Drake is summoned to the J. Cleaver Axe-Handle Estate to investigate a reported murder. Suspicions fall on a female duck, affectionately known as Shapely Lady Duck, clad in a striking red dress. Despite her amorous advances, Drake remains focused on the case.

Accusing Shapely Lady Duck of animosity towards the victim, Drake finds himself dodging bullets from her surprisingly concealed pistol. Surviving the onslaught, he recounts her resorting to a deer rifle, resulting in a barrage of shots that leave him resembling a target dummy. Undeterred, Shapely Lady Duck insists on a search, showering Drake with kisses. Surprisingly, the victim remains resilient, leading to a comical scenario involving a suspended grand piano and Drake's unintended squishing beneath it. Even after these mishaps, Shapely Lady Duck persists in her affectionate pursuit, attempting a final desperate maneuver involving train tracks. Drake, realizing his mistaken location, acknowledges her innocence, only to be startled by her confession of infatuation to him.

Observing her sincere affection, Drake, typically aloof, finds himself unnerved and hastily retreats, crashing through the wrong door. Undeterred, Shapely Lady Duck follows suit, leaving behind an amusing imprint of their chase.

== Home media ==
The Super Snooper can be found on Disc 1 of the 2007 DVD set Looney Tunes Golden Collection: Volume 5.

== See also ==
- List of Daffy Duck cartoons

Preceded by Rabbit Seasoning	Daffy Duck cartoons 1952	Succeeded by Fool Coverage
