= Hare Force =

1944 film by Friz Freleng

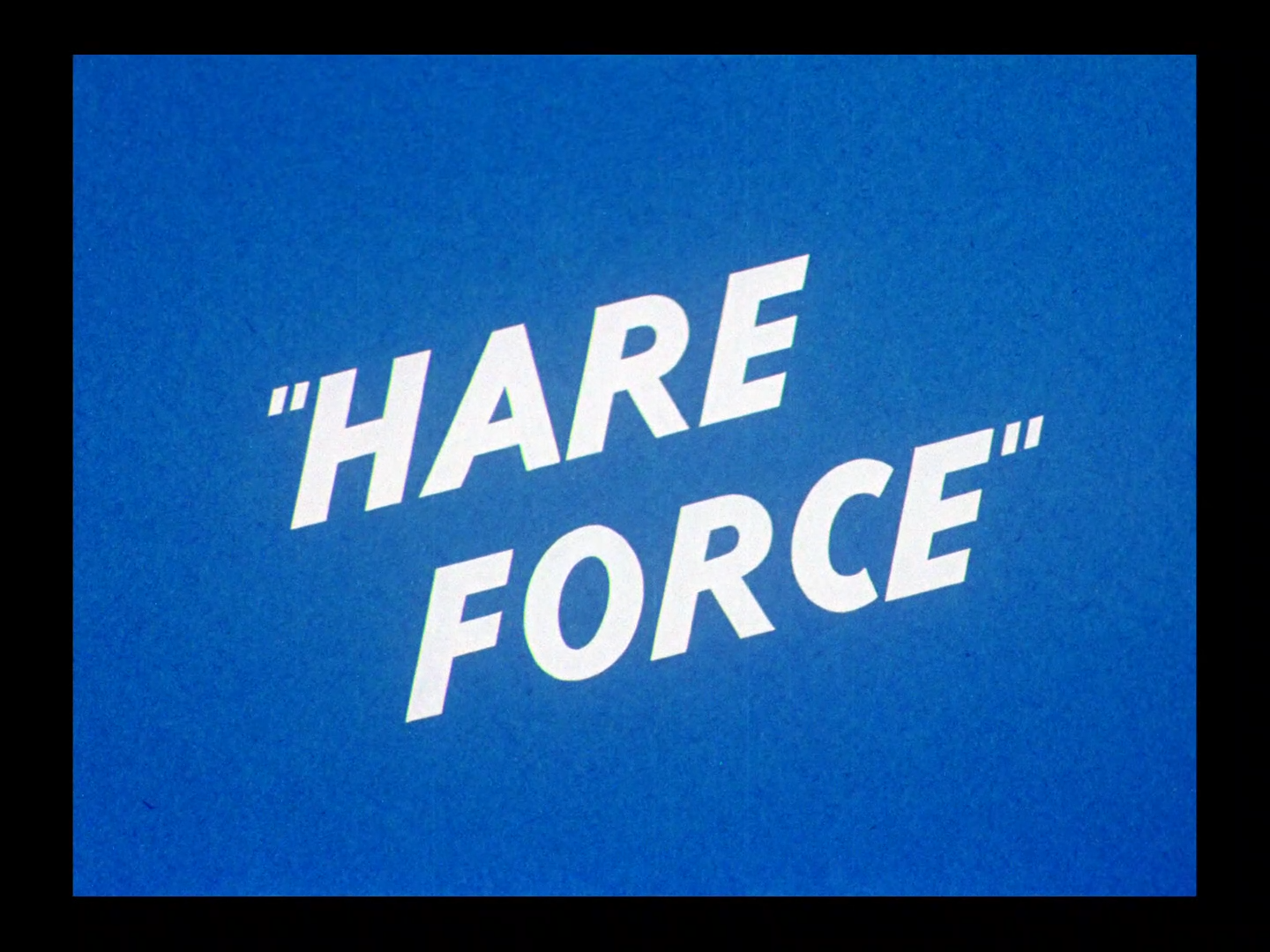
- Title card
- Directed by: I. Freleng
- Story by: Tedd Pierce
- Produced by: Leon Schlesinger
- Starring: Mel Blanc; Bea Benaderet (unc.)
- Music by: Carl W. Stalling
- Animation by: Manuel Perez
- Color process: Technicolor
- Distributed by: Warner Bros. Pictures; The Vitaphone Corporation
- Release date: July 22, 1944
- Running time: 7:00
- Language: English

Hare Force is a 1944 Warner Bros. cartoon in the Merrie Melodies series, directed by Friz Freleng. The cartoon was released on July 22, 1944, and stars Bugs Bunny.

== Plot ==
On a cold and snowy night, Bugs wangles his way into the good graces and – more importantly – the house of an old lady (voiced by Bea Benaderet). Sylvester (not to be confused with Sylvester the Cat), her dog (voiced by writer Tedd Pierce), takes an instant dislike to the Bunny, and most of the cartoon is spent with the two tricking each other into going outside the house and getting locked out. Finally they get into a schtick where they are each throwing the other out the front door, in quick succession. The old lady, fed up with all the bickering by now, intervenes and tells them both to get out, when suddenly she is thrown out, startled and indignant. Bugs and the dog have made peace, and are lazing by the fire. Bugs turns to the viewer and says "Gee, ain't I a stinker?"

== Production notes ==
Although the title is an obvious play on Air Force, the plot of Hare Force has nothing to do with the military. "As Time Goes By" is sung in this short by Sylvester the dog (not to be confused with Sylvester the Cat) and Bugs at different points.

Hare Force is the first short that uses the refined design of Bugs Bunny outside of a Bob Clampett directed cartoon, though it was slightly tweaked by Freleng in this short.

The story is similar in concept to Hiss and Make Up (1943) where Granny warns her constantly feuding pets that she would throw them out into the snow if she hears any more noise.

== Home media ==
Hare Force is available on Looney Tunes Golden Collection: Volume 3. It can also be found on the Bugs Bunny: Hollywood Legend VHS, the "Starring Bugs Bunny" VHS, the "Looney Tunes Collectors Edition: Canine Corps" VHS from Columbia House, and the "Bugs Bunny Classics" laser disc.

== See also ==
- Bugs Bunny filmography
- Looney Tunes and Merrie Melodies filmography (1940–1949)

== Sources ==
- Shull, Michael S.; Wilt, David E. (2004). "Filmography 1943". Doing Their Bit: Wartime American Animated Short Films, 1939-1945. McFarland & Company. ISBN 978-0786481699.

Preceded by Hare Ribbin'	Bugs Bunny Cartoons; 1944	Succeeded by Buckaroo Bugs
