= Stupor Duck =

1956 short film by Robert McKimson

- Lobby card
- Directed by: Robert McKimson
- Story by: Tedd Pierce
- Starring: Mel Blanc; Daws Butler
- Narrated by: Daws Butler
- Music by: Carl Stalling
- Animation by: Ted Bonnicksen; Keith Darling; Russ Dyson; George Grandpré; Harry Love (effects animation)
- Layouts by: Robert Gribbroek
- Backgrounds by: Richard H. Thomas
- Color process: Technicolor
- Production company: Warner Bros. Cartoons
- Distributed by: Warner Bros. Pictures; The Vitaphone Corporation
- Release date: July 7, 1956 (US)
- Running time: 6:39
- Language: English

Stupor Duck is a 1956 Warner Bros. Looney Tunes animated superhero comedy short directed by Robert McKimson. It was released on July 7, 1956, and stars Daffy Duck in a parody of Superman.

== Plot ==
Daffy Duck plays the roles of Stupor Duck and Cluck Trent in a parody of The Adventures of Superman. Mistakenly believing a soap opera villain named Aardvark Ratnik is real, Cluck transforms into Stupor Duck to combat the non-existent threat.

== Home video ==
- VHS – The Stars of Space Jam: Daffy Duck
- VHS – Looney Tunes Collectors Edition: Porky and Daffy
- DVD – Looney Tunes Golden Collection: Volume 5, Disc 1
- DVD – Superman: The Ultimate Collection

Preceded by Rocket Squad	List of Daffy Duck cartoons 1956	Succeeded by A Star Is Bored
