= Looney Tunes Golden Collection: Volume 5 =

2007 American DVD box set

- DVD cover
- Directed by: Bob Clampett; Friz Freleng; Chuck Jones; Tex Avery; Robert McKimson; Frank Tashlin; Arthur Davis; Maurice Noble; Hawley Pratt; Jack King; Tom Palmer
- Produced by: Leon Schlesinger; Eddie Selzer; John W. Burton; David H. DePatie
- Starring: voice of Mel Blanc
- Distributed by: Warner Home Video
- Release dates: October 30, 2007 (United States); April 18, 2011 (Region 2 UK)
- Running time: 417 minutes
- Country: United States
- Language: English

Looney Tunes Golden Collection: Volume 5 is a Looney Tunes collection on DVD. Following the pattern of one release each year of the previous volumes of the Looney Tunes Golden Collection series, it was released on October 30, 2007.

The four discs in this collection are devoted to themes and subjects the cartoons in each disc have in common. The first disc consists entirely of cartoons starring the two top stars of Warner cartoons, Bugs Bunny and/or Daffy Duck. The second disc consists entirely of cartoons which lampoon fairy tales. The third disc consists entirely of cartoons either directed or co-directed by Bob Clampett. The fourth disc titled "Early Daze" features rarely seen cartoons from the 1930s and early 1940s which were made in black-and-white.

Continuing a pattern which began with Looney Tunes Golden Collection: Volume 3, the DVD set has a warning in the beginning of each disc that states that some of the cartoons contain ethnic and racial stereotypes that may be offensive to modern audiences; however, like the fourth volume, the warning is shown on a title card rather than done as a special introduction.

== Disc 1: Bugs Bunny and Daffy Duck ==
In previous installments of the Looney Tunes Golden Collection, Disc 1 contained Bugs Bunny-centric cartoons. Disc 1 in this volume, however, contains cartoons featuring Daffy Duck as well.

#	Title	Bugs, Daffy, or Both?	Co-Stars	Director	Year	Series
1	14 Carrot Rabbit	Bugs	Sam	Friz Freleng	1952	LT
2	Ali Baba Bunny	Both	N/A	Chuck Jones	1957	MM
3	Buccaneer Bunny	Bugs	Sam	Friz Freleng	1948	LT
4	Bugs' Bonnets	Bugs	Elmer	Chuck Jones	1956	MM
5	A Star Is Bored	Both	Elmer, Sam	Friz Freleng	1956	LT
6	A Pest in the House	Daffy	Elmer	Chuck Jones	1947	MM
7	Transylvania 6-5000	Bugs	Count Bloodcount	Chuck Jones, Maurice Noble	1963	MM
8	Oily Hare	Bugs	N/A	Robert McKimson	1952	MM
9	Stupor Duck	Daffy	N/A	Robert McKimson	1956	LT
10	The Stupor Salesman	Daffy	Slug McSlug	Arthur Davis	1948	LT
11	The Abominable Snow Rabbit	Both	Hugo	Chuck Jones, Maurice Noble	1961	LT
12	The Super Snooper	Daffy	Shapely Lady Duck	Robert McKimson	1952	LT
13	The Up-Standing Sitter	Daffy	Hector	Robert McKimson	1948	LT
14	Hollywood Daffy	Daffy	N/A	Hawley Pratt (Note: Friz Freleng was originally intended to direct the short, but refused to work on it as he was unsatisfied with the story. Though no director was officially credited, Hawley Pratt, Freleng's layout artist, would direct the short in his place.)	1946	MM
15	You Were Never Duckier	Daffy	Henery	Chuck Jones	1948	MM

=== Special features ===
==== Audio bonuses ====
- Music-only audio track on Ali Baba Bunny and Stupor Duck
- Music-and-effects-only audio track on The Abominable Snow Rabbit and The Super Snooper
- Audio commentaries
  - Greg Ford on Ali Baba Bunny
  - Paul Dini on A Pest in the House
  - Jerry Beck on Transylvania 6-5000
  - Eric Goldberg on You Were Never Duckier

==== From the Vaults ====
- Chuck Jones: Extremes and In-Betweens documentary (2000) (Part 1)
- The Bugs Bunny Show
  - Bridging sequences for Bad Time Story
  - Mel Blanc audio recording sessions for What's Up, Dog?
  - General Foods commercials starring Bugs and company

== Disc 2: Fun-Filled Fairy Tales ==
#	Title	Characters	Director	Year	Series
1	Bewitched Bunny	Bugs, Witch Hazel	Chuck Jones	1954	LT
2	Paying the Piper	Porky, Supreme Cat	Robert McKimson	1949	LT
3	The Bear's Tale	N/A	Tex Avery	1940	MM
4	Foney Fables	N/A	Friz Freleng	1942	MM
5	Goldimouse and the Three Cats	Sylvester, Sylvester Jr.	Friz Freleng	1960	LT
6	Holiday for Shoestrings	N/A	Friz Freleng	1946	MM
7	Little Red Rodent Hood	Sylvester, Hector	Friz Freleng	1952	MM
8	Little Red Walking Hood	Proto-Elmer	Tex Avery	1937	MM
9	Red Riding Hoodwinked	Tweety, Sylvester, Granny	Friz Freleng	1955	LT
10	The Trial of Mr. Wolf	N/A	Friz Freleng	1941	MM
11	The Turn-Tale Wolf	N/A	Robert McKimson	1952	MM
12	Tom Thumb in Trouble	N/A	Chuck Jones	1940	MM
13	Tweety and the Beanstalk	Tweety, Sylvester	Friz Freleng	1957	MM
14	A Gander at Mother Goose	N/A	Tex Avery	1940	MM
15	Señorella and the Glass Huarache	N/A	Hawley Pratt	1964	LT

=== Special features ===
==== Audio bonuses ====
- Music-only audio tracks on Goldimouse and the Three Cats, Red Riding Hoodwinked, and Tweety and the Beanstalk
- Music-and-effects-only audio tracks on Bewitched Bunny and The Turn-Tale Wolf
- Audio commentaries
  - Eric Goldberg on Bewitched Bunny
  - Daniel Goldmark on Holiday for Shoestrings
  - Mark Kausler on Little Red Walking Hood
  - Greg Ford on Red Riding Hoodwinked
  - Jerry Beck on Tom Thumb in Trouble

==== From the Vaults ====
- Chuck Jones: Extremes and In-Betweens documentary (2000), Part 2
- A Chuck Jones Tutorial: Tricks of the Cartoon Trade featurette (2002)

==== Behind the Tunes ====
- Once upon a Looney Tune
- Drawn to Life: The Art of Robert McKimson

== Disc 3: Putting a Bob Clampett on It ==
All cartoons on this disc are directed by Bob Clampett.

#	Title	Characters	Year	Series
1	Bacall to Arms (Note: Co-directed by Arthur Davis, though neither he nor Clampett are officially credited.)	N/A	1946	MM
2	Buckaroo Bugs	Bugs	1944	LT
3	Crazy Cruise (Note: Co-directed by Tex Avery, though neither he nor Clampett are officially credited.)	N/A	1942	MM
4	Farm Frolics	N/A	1941	MM
5	Hare Ribbin'	Bugs	1944	MM
6	Patient Porky	Porky	1940	LT
7	Prehistoric Porky	Porky	1940	LT
8	The Bashful Buzzard	Beaky	1945	LT
9	The Old Grey Hare	Bugs, Elmer	1944	MM
10	The Wacky Wabbit	Bugs, Elmer	1942	MM
11	The Wise Quacking Duck	Daffy	1943	LT
12	Wagon Heels	Porky	1945	MM
13	The Daffy Doc	Daffy, Porky	1938	LT
14	A Tale of Two Kitties	Tweety, Babbit and Catstello	1942	MM
15	Porky's Pooch	Porky	1941	LT

=== Special features ===
==== Audio commentaries ====
- Jerry Beck on Bacall to Arms
- Michael Barrier on Buckaroo Bugs and A Tale of Two Kitties
- Eddie Fitzgerald, John Kricfalusi, and Kali Fontecchio on Buckaroo Bugs
- Keith Scott on Farm Frolics
- Paul Dini on The Bashful Buzzard
- Greg Ford on The Old Grey Hare
- Eric Goldberg on The Wacky Wabbit
- Mark Kausler on The Daffy Doc

==== Behind the Tunes ====
- Wacky Warner One-Shots: A look at Warner Bros. cartoons that had one-shot characters
- Real American Zero: The Adventures of Private Snafu: A look at Private Snafu, an obscure Warner Bros. character made for the U.S. military during World War II whose cartoons were informative and entertaining looks at what not to do in active combat.

==== From the Vaults ====
- The director's cut of Hare Ribbin'.
- The Bashful Buzzard original storyboards.
- The Bashful Buzzard original opening music cue.
- Milt Franklyn opening themes with intro by Greg Ford.
- Private Snafu Cartoons:
  - Coming!! Snafu (1943)
  - Gripes (1943)
- Seaman Hook Cartoons:
  - The Good Egg (1945)
  - The Return of Mr. Hook (1945)
  - Tokyo Woes (1945)

== Disc 4: Early Daze ==
All cartoons on this disc are in black-and-white.

#	Title	Characters	Director	Year	Series
1	Alpine Antics	Beans, Porky	Jack King	1936	LT
2	Eatin' On The Cuff or The Moth Who Came to Dinner		Bob Clampett	1942	LT
3	Milk and Money	Porky	Tex Avery	1936	LT
4	I've Got to Sing a Torch Song		Tom Palmer	1933	MM
5	Porky at the Crocadero	Porky	Frank Tashlin	1938	LT
6	Polar Pals	Porky	Bob Clampett	1939	LT
7	Scrap Happy Daffy	Daffy	Frank Tashlin	1943	LT
8	Porky's Double Trouble	Porky, Petunia	Frank Tashlin	1937	LT
9	Gold Diggers of '49	Porky, Beans	Tex Avery	1935	LT
10	Pilgrim Porky	Porky	Bob Clampett	1940	LT
11	Wise Quacks	Daffy, Porky	Bob Clampett	1939	LT
12	Porky's Preview	Porky	Tex Avery	1941	LT
13	Porky's Poppa	Porky	Bob Clampett	1938	LT
14	Wholly Smoke	Porky	Frank Tashlin	1938	LT
15	What Price Porky	Daffy, Porky	Bob Clampett	1938	LT

=== Special Features ===
==== Audio commentaries ====
- Jerry Beck on Eatin' On The Cuff, or The Moth Who Came to Dinner
- Daniel Goldmark on Porky at the Crocadero and Wholly Smoke
- Greg Ford on Scrap Happy Daffy and Porky's Preview

==== From the Vaults ====
- Unsung Maestros: A Directors' Tribute—A salute to most of the lesser-known animation directors who had short tenures at the Schlesinger/Warner cartoon studio. Directors profiled include Hugh Harman, Rudolf Ising, Jack King, Ub Iwerks, Ben Hardaway, Norman McCabe and Arthur Davis.
- Television Specials:
  - Bugs Bunny's Looney Christmas Tales (1979)
  - Bugs Bunny's Bustin' Out All Over (1980)
  - Bugs and Daffy's Carnival of the Animals (1976)

== See also ==
- Looney Tunes and Merrie Melodies filmography
  - Looney Tunes and Merrie Melodies filmography (1929–1939)
  - Looney Tunes and Merrie Melodies filmography (1940–1949)
  - Looney Tunes and Merrie Melodies filmography (1950–1959)
  - Looney Tunes and Merrie Melodies filmography (1960–1969)
  - Looney Tunes and Merrie Melodies filmography (1970–present)
