= Red Riding Hoodwinked =

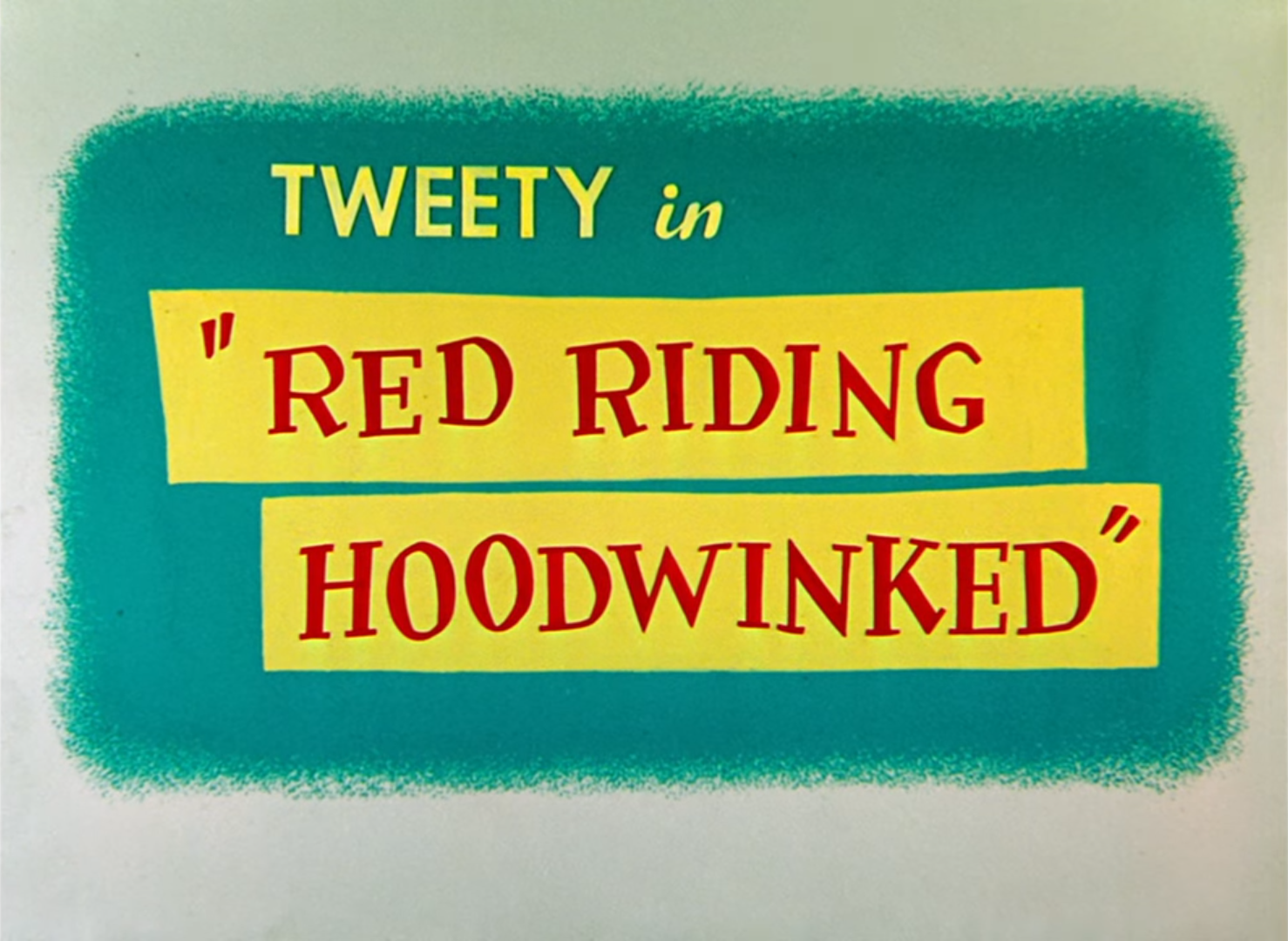
- Title card
- Directed by: I. Freleng
- Story by: Warren Foster
- Starring: Mel Blanc
- Music by: Milt Franklyn
- Animation by: Gerry Chiniquy; Arthur Davis; Ted Bonnicksen
- Layouts by: Hawley Pratt
- Backgrounds by: Irv Wyner
- Color process: Technicolor
- Production company: Warner Bros. Cartoons
- Distributed by: Warner Bros. Pictures
- Release date: October 29, 1955
- Running time: 7 minutes
- Language: English

Red Riding Hoodwinked is a Warner Bros. Looney Tunes cartoon directed by Friz Freleng, released on October 29, 1955, starring Tweety, Sylvester, and Granny. The latter part of the title is a term that means to have been deceived/tricked.

The cartoon was Warner Bros.' latest spoof of the Little Red Riding Hood children's story, and the fourth overall following Little Red Walking Hood, Little Red Riding Rabbit and Little Red Rodent Hood, with the Big Bad Wolf and Granny playing their respective roles, with Tweety and Sylvester taking appropriate sides.

Unlike her previous appearances, the usually cheerful Granny here is a female caricature of Ralph Kramden (of television's The Honeymooners), complete with ill-temperedness and use of the catchphrase, "One of these days, one of these days...POW! Right in the kisser!" As such, "Red Riding Hoodwinked" marked one of the earliest parodies of The Honeymooners. In addition, Granny's appearance is updated: although she appears as a sourpuss here, her physical attributes (such as a less-pronounced chin) would be used in future appearances. Also, Granny's old-fashioned ways would be de-emphasized.

The wolf character would re-appear in a Merrie Melodies short, Hare-Less Wolf, released three years later, albeit designed differently and given the name Charles M. Wolf.

== Plot ==
The story begins much like the classic fairy tale, with Red Riding Hood, who lives in the city, off to see her grandmother, who lives in the woods. The present she plans to bring her grandmother is Tweety (in his cage). Sylvester sees Red's cargo and immediately begins going after her, his primary interest being Tweety. Red boards the bus, but Sylvester continues after her as it drives into the woods, the inattentive cat striking a road sign along the way.

In the woods, the Big Bad Wolf — rougher looking in appearance than in later shorts — waits for Red to come by. A sign announces who Big Bad is, which annoys him. Sylvester overhears the requisite exchange of Big Bad asking Red where she is headed and soon joins Big Bad in trying to reach Granny's house first. In fact, both villains nearly beat each other up trying to be "Grandma" to catch their prey ("You're musclin' in on my racket!")

Big Bad ousts Granny from the house, to which she immediately swears revenge (mimicking Ralph Kramden's signature "POW! Right in the kisser!" line; when this short was released, The Honeymooners was at the peak of its popularity). Big Bad and Sylvester hurriedly dress in Granny's clothing in anticipation of Red's arrival. Big Bad takes his place in the bed after shooing Sylvester underneath it. Once Red arrives and presents "Grandma" with Tweety, she sets it down as asked; Sylvester immediately approaches the cage, prompting Tweety to ask: "Hewwo, Wittle Wed Widing Hood's gwandma! Whatcha doin' under da bed?" After the signature exchange ending with "The better to see, and smell, and eat you with," and each character's realization of their sworn enemy (Red: "Oh! The Big Bad Wolf!" Tweety: "Eek! The big bad puddy tat!"), the chase begins.

After several back-and-forth chases, with Big Bad and Sylvester both getting the worse end of things, Red and Tweety flee Granny's home and head for the nearest bus stop. Their pursuers chase after the bus and immediately board at the next stop, only to be forcibly ejected and punched by the bus driver. That driver is none other than Granny, who then shouts, "I told 'em, one of these days...!" Red and Tweety supply the rest of the line: "POW! Right/wight in the kisser!" The screen irises out.

== Voices ==
- Mel Blanc as Sylvester, Tweety, Big Bad Wolf
- June Foray as Granny, Red Riding Hood

== Home media ==
The short is available on disc 2 of the Looney Tunes Golden Collection: Volume 5 DVD set and disc 2 of the Looney Tunes Collector's Vault: Volume 1 Blu-ray set.

== See also ==
- List of American films of 1955
