= Porky's Preview =

1941 film by Fred Avery

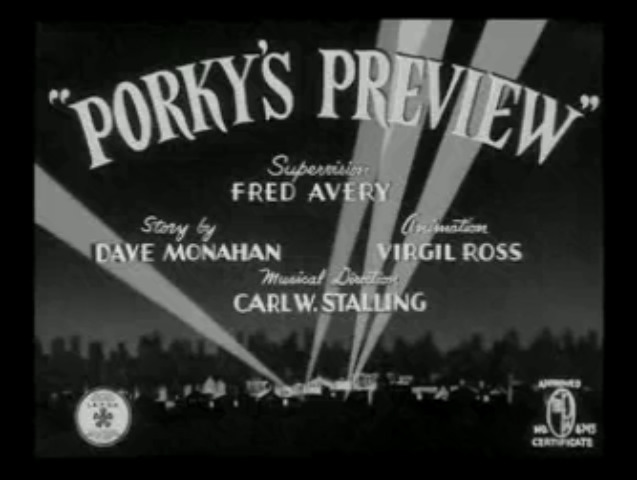
- Title card
- Directed by: Fred Avery
- Written by: Dave Monahan
- Produced by: Leon Schlesinger
- Starring: Mel Blanc; Sara Berner; Cliff Nazarro
- Music by: Carl W. Stalling
- Animation by: Virgil Ross
- Color process: Black-and-white
- Production company: Leon Schlesinger Productions
- Distributed by: Warner Bros. Pictures
- Release date: April 19, 1941
- Running time: 6 min
- Country: United States
- Language: English

Porky's Preview is a 1941 American animated comedy short film directed by Fred Avery. The short was released on April 19, 1941. It is part of the Looney Tunes series, the 85th cartoon to feature Porky Pig and the last Porky cartoon to be directed by Avery, whose cartoons elevated Porky to stardom.

== Plot ==
Porky Pig has arranged the screening of a film in a movie theater for an audience of barnyard animals. The public goes to the ticket booth. A chicken buys tickets for herself and her three "children" (eggs). A kangaroo tears the tickets (and even the hand that holds it) and throws them in his pouch. A firefly usher leads the audience with his hindquarters as a bright lamp. A skunk has a "scent" (pun on smelling it, and 1 cent of a dollar) and cannot enter, so he goes through the back door.

Porky presents an animated film he produced himself titled Porky Pig's Funny Pictures. The film turns out to be a series of small sketches of primitive characters drawn with stick figures, minimalist, with settings that seem to have been penciled by a child. After the film, Porky is surprised to see the theater in shambles. The only audience remaining is the skunk (whose presence drove away everyone else). The skunk enthusiastically applauds Porky's film.

== Reception ==
The Film Daily called the short a "fair cartoon", saying, "Some of the characterizations are amusing... Rate it as just fair."

== Home media ==
DVD:

- Looney Tunes Golden Collection: Volume 5
- Porky Pig 101

== See also ==
- Porky Pig filmography
- Looney Tunes and Merrie Melodies filmography (1940–1949)
- List of animated films in the public domain in the United States
