= Holiday for Shoestrings =

- Directed by: Friz Freleng
- Written by: Tedd Pierce; Michael Maltese
- Music by: Carl W. Stalling
- Animation by: Gerry Chiniquy; Manuel Perez; Ken Champin; Virgil Ross
- Layouts by: Hawley Pratt
- Backgrounds by: Paul Julian
- Color process: Technicolor
- Production company: Warner Bros. Cartoons
- Distributed by: Warner Bros. Pictures
- Release date: February 23, 1946
- Running time: 7 min.
- Language: English

Holiday for Shoestrings is a 1946 Warner Bros. Merrie Melodies cartoon short directed by Friz Freleng. The short was released on February 23, 1946. The film is a spoof of the fairy tale "The Elves and the Shoemaker".

The plot concerns a pack of elves who help a shoemaker, Jake. The cartoon is set to a number of classical music pieces, some of which are used as running gags, especially from "The Nutcracker Suite". The title is a play on the David Rose number "Holiday for Strings". However, that tune is not played in the score.

The cartoon is done largely in pantomime, with the occasional (unintelligible) bickering of elves, many of which look like miniature versions of Elmer Fudd with elf-like ears (anticipating a similar role played by Elmer 10 years later).

== Plot ==
Based on the classic Fairy Tale, the cartoon concerns a pack of Elmer Fudd-like elves who help a shoemaker, Jake, who has advertised for help. The cartoon is done largely in pantomime with the gags timed to a number of classical music pieces, from such composers as Johann Strauss, Frederic Chopin, and Peter Ilyich Tchaikovsky, with the occasional (unintelligible) bickering of the elves.

The twist on the usual story is that the bedridden shoemaker, suddenly feeling much better upon seeing the elves working feverishly, tries to sneak out to play golf, possibly implying that the shoemaker was actually faking his illness the whole time to avoid from doing his job. The elves, realizing this, drag Jake back to bed, tie him down ala Gulliver's Travels, and are seen dragging the golf clubs out of the house for themselves to play a round with, at iris-out.

== Home media ==
The short is available on disc 2 of the Looney Tunes Golden Collection: Volume 5 DVD set, and on disc 2 of the Looney Tunes Collector's Vault: Volume 3 Blu-ray set.

== See also ==
- Looney Tunes and Merrie Melodies filmography (1940–1949)
