= The Curious Puppy =

1939 film by Charles Jones

- Directed by: Charles Jones
- Story by: Robert Givens
- Produced by: Leon Schlesinger
- Starring: Mel Blanc
- Music by: Carl W. Stalling
- Animation by: Philip Monroe
- Color process: Technicolor
- Production company: Leon Schlesinger Productions
- Distributed by: Warner Bros. Pictures
- Release date: December 23, 1939
- Running time: 7 min
- Country: United States
- Language: English

The Curious Puppy is a 1939 American animated comedy short film directed by Charles Jones. The short was released on December 2, 1939. It is part of the Merrie Melodies series and the third cartoon to star the Two Curious Puppies. It was re-released as a "Blue Ribbon" reissue in 1948, rendering the original film and credits lost.

== Plot ==
The smaller puppy finds and enters an amusement park at night. He barks at the cat sign of the Black Cat Cafe, unaware that it is not an actual cat. While making his way to the cat, he accidentally falls into the master switch and powers on the amusement park. He is then intrigued by a giant swing.

The larger puppy, who serves as the watch dog for the amusement park, wakes up and is confused by the lights. He is angered by the smaller puppy's ignorance and chases him while he walks into a house of mirrors. The larger puppy is intrigued by his appearance, so the smaller puppy mimics the larger puppy's actions until he realizes the ruse and chases the smaller puppy out.

The smaller puppy is chased into a photo booth then knocked into a popcorn machine to his amusement. As the smaller puppy notices the larger puppy, the smaller puppy digs into the popcorn, which the larger puppy reacts by turning on the machine, which drenches the puppy in salt and oil before stuffing him into a paper bag which the larger puppy carries. The smaller puppy escapes effortlessly but reveals his location upon spotting fake kittens. They slide down a water slide then into a shelf of puppies which resemble the smaller puppy. The larger puppy runs into the shelf then tears apart what seems to be the smaller puppy, only to find that he had already left the premise to his chagrin.
