= Foney Fables =

1942 film by Isadore Freleng

- Title card
- Directed by: Isadore Freleng
- Story by: Michael Maltese
- Produced by: Leon Schlesinger
- Starring: Mel Blanc
- Music by: Carl W. Stalling
- Animation by: Richard Bickenbach
- Color process: Technicolor
- Production company: Leon Schlesinger Productions
- Distributed by: Warner Bros. Pictures
- Release date: August 1, 1942
- Running time: 6 min
- Country: United States
- Language: English

Foney Fables is a 1942 American animated comedy short film directed by Isadore Freleng. It was released on August 1, 1942. It is part of the Merrie Melodies series.

The film

== Plot ==
The film is a series of unrelated gags involving fables.

Sleeping Beauty is waken up by Prince Charming shaking her out of impatience. Tom Thumb somehow grows into a giant boy by taking Vitamin B-1. The ant works while the grasshopper relaxes, having bought war bonds as an alternative means of stability. Jack successfully escapes from the two-headed giant from the beanstalk, as one of the giant's head is sick. A wolf in sheep's clothing finds another wolf in sheep's clothing sneaking near actual sheep. Aladdin attempts to summon the genie who is somehow on strike. A goose that lays golden eggs lays aluminum eggs instead for national defense. Old Mother Hubbard is betrayed by her dog after he finds her to have hidden meat. This Little Piggy ends with the baby complaining about being hurt.

A running gag involves The Boy Who Cried Wolf fooling the townsfolk and ends with him being eaten.

== Home media ==
This short is available on disc 2 of the Looney Tunes Golden Collection: Volume 5 DVD set.
