= Fool Coverage =

1952 film by Robert McKimson

- Title card
- Directed by: Robert McKimson
- Story by: Tedd Pierce
- Starring: Mel Blanc
- Music by: Carl Stalling
- Animation by: Phil DeLara; Charles McKimson; Herman Cohen; Rod Scribner; Keith Darling (uncredited)
- Layouts by: Robert Givens
- Backgrounds by: Carlos Manriquez
- Color process: Technicolor
- Production company: Warner Bros. Cartoons
- Distributed by: Warner Bros. Pictures; The Vitaphone Corporation
- Release date: December 13, 1952
- Running time: 6:58
- Country: United States
- Language: English

Fool Coverage is a 1952 Warner Bros. Looney Tunes cartoon directed by Robert McKimson. The cartoon was released on December 13, 1952, and stars Daffy Duck and Porky Pig.

In the short, Daffy is an insurance salesman, trying to sell a reluctant Porky a "full coverage" policy.

== Plot ==
Porky is accosted by Daffy, an assertive insurance salesman representing the Hotfoot Casualty Underwriters Insurance Company of Schenectady, New York. Daffy persistently urges Porky to purchase an insurance policy offering $1 million coverage for a mere black eye, despite Porky's initial refusal. Daffy's relentless pursuit leads him to shadow Porky throughout the household, cautioning him about the perils of mundane domestic activities. However, Daffy's attempts to demonstrate these dangers often result in comical misfortune, such as an oven explosion triggered by his flashlight demonstration.

Further antics ensue as Daffy fills Porky's closet with improbable items, only to be met with Porky's denial of ownership for each request. A series of slapstick mishaps, including falling through a concealed hole in the floor and inadvertently detonating dynamite disguised as a candle, befall Daffy as his schemes backfire.

Despite Porky's initial skepticism, he eventually succumbs to Daffy's persuasive tactics and agrees to the insurance policy, only to discover the absurd conditions in the fine print. The policy stipulates that the $1 million payout is contingent upon a specific scenario involving a stampede of wild elephants in Porky's home between 3:55 and 4:00 pm on the Fourth of July during a hailstorm. Coincidentally, a stampede of wild elephants does materialize in Porky's living room, precisely at the designated time, on the rightful date, and under the specified weather conditions. However, Daffy's attempt to evade payment by referencing an additional provision for a baby zebra proves futile when an actual baby zebra appears alongside the elephants. Realizing his imminent financial liability, Daffy faints, resigned to the inevitable payout despite his failed attempts to manipulate the fine print.

== Home media ==
Fool Coverage was released on the DVD Looney Tunes Super Stars' Porky & Friends: Hilarious Ham.

== See also ==
- List of Daffy Duck cartoons
- Porky Pig filmography

Preceded by The Super Snooper	Daffy Duck cartoons 1952	Succeeded by Design for Leaving
Preceded by Cracked Quack	Porky Pig cartoons 1952	Succeeded by Duck Dodgers in the 24½th Century
