= Bob Givens =

American animator (1918–2017)

- Born: Robert Herman Givens, II; March 2, 1918; Hanson, Kentucky, U.S.
- Died: December 14, 2017 (aged 99); Burbank, California, U.S.
- Occupations: Animator; character designer; storyboard artist; layout design artist
- Years active: 1936–2001
- Children: 2

Robert Herman Givens (March 2, 1918 – December 14, 2017) was an American animator and character designer, responsible for the creation of Bugs Bunny. He was the leading character designer for Leon Schlesinger, creating over 25 successful characters for both Leon Schlesinger Productions and later Warner Bros. Cartoons. He also did the storyboards and layout designs. He worked for numerous animation studios during his career, including Walt Disney Animation Studios, Warner Bros. Cartoons, Hanna-Barbera, and DePatie–Freleng Enterprises, beginning his career during the late 1930s and continuing until the early 2000s. He was a collaborator with the Merrie Melodies/Looney Tunes directors at Warner Bros. and Chuck Jones' production company.

== Early life ==
Born in Hanson, Kentucky on March 2, 1918, Givens was one of twin boys. His family moved to southern California, hoping the climate would improve the poor health of his father, who was a horse breeder and rancher. He attended Alhambra High School, graduating in 1936 and Chouinard Art Institute, California Institute of the Arts. He worked as a freelance artist in his senior year of high school before joining the Walt Disney Studio in 1937 on the recommendation of school classmate and Disney staffer Hardie Gramatky.

== Animation career ==
After joining Disney, he worked as an animation checker and timer on several of their short subjects (mostly involving Donald Duck), before working on their first feature-length film, Snow White and the Seven Dwarfs (1937).

He subsequently joined Warner Bros. Cartoons for his first stint at the studio, which was spent working with Bob Clampett, Friz Freleng, Chuck Jones, Robert McKimson, and Tex Avery. For the cartoon A Wild Hare (1940), Avery asked Givens to design a rabbit which Avery thought had potential, but was "too cute". Givens, therefore, created the first official design for the rabbit, now named Bugs Bunny. Givens' design was subsequently refined by fellow animator Robert McKimson (under whom Givens would frequently work in the decades ahead) two years later.

Givens' initial spell at the studio ended when he was drafted during World War II; his last cartoon for the studio before leaving was The Draft Horse (1942). As part of his military service, he worked with former Warner Bros. animator Rudolf Ising on military training films. In 1949, Givens joined UPA and became John Hubley's Character Designer and Layout Artist to create the very successful Mr. Magoo Character. He subsequently returned to Warner Bros. in the 1950s and mostly worked as a layout artist under McKimson, and also Jones later on, staying with the studio until its 1954 shutdown. Unlike many of his co-workers, Givens did not rejoin the Warner Bros. studio when it eventually opened again, and worked at various other studios, including, UPA, Hanna-Barbera and the Jack Kinney studio. He returned for one last spell at Warner Bros. in the early 1960s, continuing until the studio's final shutdown, and even acting as the layout artist on False Hare (1964), the final cartoon (in production order) made by the studio.

Givens followed most of the Warner Bros. staffers to new studio DePatie–Freleng Enterprises, while also working with Jones once more on the Tom and Jerry cartoons produced by Jones at Sib Tower 12 Productions. He continued his Looney Tunes association by working at the Warner Bros.-Seven Arts cartoon studio in the late 1960s, remaining with that studio until it shut down. Further spells at DePatie–Freleng and Hanna-Barbera followed during the 1970s, before working at the reformed Warner Bros. Animation studio on Friz Freleng's Looney Looney Looney Bugs Bunny Movie (1981), Bugs Bunny's 3rd Movie: 1001 Rabbit Tales (1982) and Daffy Duck's Fantastic Island (1983). He then had spells at Filmation (whose founder, Lou Scheimer, had actually worked under Givens when the two were freelancers in the 1950s) and Film Roman.

Givens did the layout from Garfield and Friends from seasons 1 through 4 (1988 to 1992) and Bobby's World from seasons 1 through 5 (1989 to 1994) at Film Roman studios.

In the 1990s, he worked with Chuck Jones once again, handling the production design duties on the Looney Tunes cartoons that Jones' production company worked on for Warner Bros. His last animation credit was on 2001's Timber Wolf, a direct-to-video animated feature written and produced by Jones. After Jones died the following year, Givens largely retired from active animation work, though he continued to teach and give animation talks well into his 90s.

Overview: Robert (Bob) Givens was involved in every startup studio in Los Angeles in the Golden Age Of Animation assisting the Director's in character designs and layouts.

== Death ==
Givens died of respiratory failure, on December 14, 2017, at Providence Saint Joseph Medical Center in Burbank, California, at the age of 99.

== Partial filmography ==
- 1937: Don Donald (animation checker)
- 1937: Woodland Café (animation checker)
- 1937: Magician Mickey (animation checker)
- 1937: Little Hiawatha (animation checker)
- 1937: Moose Hunters (animation checker)
- 1937: Clock Cleaners (animation checker)
- 1937: The Old Mill (animation checker)
- 1937: Donald's Ostrich (animation checker)
- 1937: Snow White and the Seven Dwarfs (assistant animator)
- 1938: Self-Control (animation checker)
- 1938: Donald's Better Self (animation checker)
- 1938: Donald's Nephews (animation checker)
- 1938: Moth and the Flame (animation checker)
- 1938: Good Scouts (animation checker)
- 1938: Farmyard Symphony (animation checker)
- 1939: Old Glory (writer)
- 1939: Little Lion Hunter (writer)
- 1939: The Curious Puppy (writer)
- 1939: Sniffles and the Bookworm (character designer)
- 1940: The Egg Collector (writer)
- 1940: Mighty Hunters (character designer)
- 1940: Tom Thumb in Trouble (character designer)
- 1940: A Wild Hare (character designer)
- 1940: Stage Fright (character designer)
- 1941: Tortoise Beats Hare (character designer)
- 1941: Hiawatha's Rabbit Hunt (character designer)
- 1941: Rhapsody in Rivets (character designer)
- 1942: Hop, Skip and a Chump (layout artist)
- 1942: The Draft Horse (layout artist)
- 1945: Nasty Quacks (layout artist)
- 1946: Hare Remover (layout artist)
- 1950: Trouble Indemnity (layout artist)
- 1952: The EGGcited Rooster (layout artist)
- 1952: Fool Coverage (layout artist)
- 1953: Cat-Tails for Two (layout artist)
- 1953: Of Rice and Hen (layout artist)
- 1954: Bell Hoppy (layout artist)
- 1954: Devil May Hare (layout artist)
- 1954: Gone Batty (layout artist)
- 1955: Feather Dusted (layout artist)
- 1955: Beanstalk Bunny (layout artist)
- 1955: All Fowled Up (layout artist)
- 1955: Dime to Retire (layout artist)
- 1959–62: The Quick Draw McGraw Show (layout artist)
- 1960–61: Mister Magoo (layout artist)
- 1960–61: Popeye the Sailor (layout artist)
- 1960–2000: The Bugs Bunny Show (layout artist)
- 1960: Crockett-Doodle-Do (animator)
- 1963: Transylvania 6-5000 (layout artist)
- 1964: Dumb Patrol (layout artist)
- 1964: The Iceman Ducketh (layout artist)
- 1964: False Hare (layout artist)
- 1966: Filet Meow (layout artist)
- 1968: Skyscraper Caper (layout artist)
- 1968: See Ya Later Gladiator (layout artist)
- 1968: Bunny and Claude: We Rob Carrot Patches (layout artist)
- 1968: The Great Carrot-Train Robbery (layout artist)
- 1969: Injun Trouble (layout artist)
- 1971: Dr. Seuss' The Cat in the Hat (layout artist)
- 1971–72: Help!... It's the Hair Bear Bunch (layout artist)
- 1972: The Houndcats (layout artist)
- 1973–75: Bailey's Comets (layout artist)
- 1973: Yogi's Gang (layout artist)
- 1974: Wheelie and the Chopper Bunch (layout artist)
- 1975–78: The Great Grape Ape Show (layout artist)
- 1977: Bugs Bunny's Easter Funnies (layout artist)
- 1977: Bugs Bunny's Howl-oween Special (layout artist)
- 1977: Baggy Pants and the Nitwits (graphic designer)
- 1979: Bugs Bunny's Valentine (layout artist)
- 1979–81: The Plastic Man Comedy/Adventure Show (layout artist)
- 1980–81: Heathcliff (layout artist)
- 1981: Friz Freleng's Looney, Looney, Looney Bugs Bunny Movie (layout artist)
- 1982: Bugs Bunny's Mad World of Television (layout artist)
- 1982: Bugs Bunny's 3rd Movie: 1001 Rabbit Tales (layout artist)/(production designer)
- 1983: Daffy Duck's Fantastic Island (layout artist)/(production designer)
- 1983–84: Saturday Supercade (layout artist)
- 1983–90: Alvin and the Chipminks (layout artist)
- 1985–86: It's Punky Brewster (layout artist)
- 1985–87: She-Ra: Princess of Power (layout artist)
- 1986: Ghostbusters (layout artist)
- 1987: The Duxorcist (layout artist)
- 1988: Daffy Duck's Quackbusters (layout artist)/(production designer)
- 1988–94: Garfield and Friends (key layout artist)
- 1989: Bugs Bunny's Wild World of Sports (layout artist)
- 1991–92: Mother Goose and Grimm (layout artist)
- 1994: The Angry Beavers pilot - “Snowbound” (layout artist)
- 1995: Another Froggy Evening (production designer)
- 1995–2000: The Sylvester and Tweety Mysteries (background key designer)
- 1996: Superior Duck (production designer)
- 1997: Pullet Surprise (production designer)
- 1997: From Hare to Eternity (production designer)
- 2000: Chuck Jones: Extremes & Inbetweens – A Life in Animation (himself; documentary)
- 2001: Timber Wolf (production designer)
- 2015: Walt Disney (himself; documentary)

== See also ==
- Walt Disney – PBS film first screened in 2015
