= Eatin' on the Cuff =

1942 film by Robert Clampett

- Title card
- Directed by: Robert Clampett
- Story by: Warren Foster
- Produced by: Leon Schlesinger
- Starring: Mel Blanc
- Music by: Carl W. Stalling
- Animation by: Virgil Ross
- Color process: Black-and-white
- Production company: Leon Schlesinger Productions
- Distributed by: Warner Bros. Pictures
- Release date: August 22, 1942
- Running time: 6 min
- Country: United States
- Language: English

Eatin' on the Cuff, also known by its subtitle The Moth Who Came to Dinner, is a 1942 American animated comedy short film directed by Robert Clampett. The short was released on August 22, 1942. It is part of the Looney Tunes series and the final black-and-white cartoon to be directed by Clampett, as Norman McCabe was instead mandated to only direct black-and-white shorts.

The film

== Plot ==
A pianist (portrayed in live-action by Leo White with his voice dubbed by Mel Blanc) tells the story of a moth and bee who fall in love with each other at a casino. On their wedding day, the moth excitedly eats multiple pieces of clothing, including a fox scarf whose remaining hair makes him resemble Adolf Hitler. He then consumes the trousers worn by multiple men to their expense.

At half past three, the moth realizes he is almost late and attempts to rush to the wedding, but is abducted by an old female spider who wears bawdy makeup and sexually assaults him. She chases the moth but lands in someone's martini. She finds a book and finds out moths are attracted to flames. She uses a lighter to conjure a flame, which the moth rejects until he is hypnotized into flying into her house.

The dejected bee hears the moth yelling for help and duels with the spider with their stingers. The spider gives up and admits the bee is a better fighter than she is, as the moth and bee embrace. The pianist ends the story by remarking his confusion at the bee's attraction to the moth. The moth is enraged by the disrespect and eats the pianist's trousers instead, sending him tumbling in embarrassment across a Warner Bros. Pictures soundstage.

== Home media ==
This short is available on disc 4 of the Looney Tunes Golden Collection: Volume 5 DVD set.

== See also ==
- Looney Tunes and Merrie Melodies filmography (1940–1949)
- List of animated films in the public domain in the United States
