= Bugs Bunny: Superstar =

1975 film

Bugs Bunny Superstar
- Theatrical release poster
- Directed by: Larry Jackson
- Produced by: Larry Jackson
- Starring: Bob Clampett; Tex Avery; Friz Freleng
- Narrated by: Orson Welles
- Cinematography: Gary Graver
- Edited by: Brian King
- Music by: Ian Whitcomb
- Production company: Hare-Raising Films
- Distributed by: United Artists
- Release date: December 19, 1975 (premiere)
- Running time: 90 minutes
- Country: United States
- Language: English

Bugs Bunny: Superstar is a 1975 Looney Tunes documentary film narrated by Orson Welles and produced and directed by Larry Jackson. It was the first documentary to examine the history of Looney Tunes with its animated cartoon characters, as well as the only Looney Tunes film to not be distributed by Warner Bros. Pictures. The film generally received positive reviews.

== Content ==
=== Cartoons ===
The film includes nine Looney Tunes/Merrie Melodies cartoons (six featuring Bugs Bunny) previously released throughout the 1940s:

- What's Cookin' Doc? (1944), directed by Bob Clampett, written by Michael Sasanoff
- The Wild Hare (a.k.a. A Wild Hare) (1940), directed by Tex Avery, written by Rich Hogan
- A Corny Concerto (1943), directed by Clampett, written by Frank Tashlin
- I Taw a Putty Tat (1948), directed by Friz Freleng, written by Tedd Pierce
- Rhapsody Rabbit (1946), directed by Freleng, written by Pierce and Michael Maltese
- Walky Talky Hawky (1946), directed by Robert McKimson, written by Warren Foster
- My Favorite Duck (1942), directed by Chuck Jones, written by Maltese
- Hair-Raising Hare (1946), directed by Jones, written by Pierce
- The Old Grey Hare (1944), directed by Clampett, written by Sasanoff

=== Interviews ===
Bugs Bunny: Superstar includes interviews with some legendary Warner Bros. animation directors of that time period: Friz Freleng, Tex Avery and most prominently Bob Clampett. Clampett, whose collection of drawings, films, and memorabilia from the golden days of Termite Terrace was legendary, provided nearly all of the behind-the-scenes drawings and home-movie footage; furthermore, his wife, Sody Clampett, is credited as production coordinator.

Robert McKimson, Mel Blanc, and Chuck Jones were intended to be interviewed, but all three were ultimately not involved for various reasons. Freleng and Avery appear only fleetingly; according to Jackson, Freleng was laconic and did not reveal much, and while Avery spoke at length and was entertaining, relatively little of what he said could be used for the film.

Approximately 30 minutes of the film's 90-minute duration is made up of documentary footage.

== Production ==
The nine full-length cartoons featured in Bugs Bunny: Superstar were originally released between July 1940 and April 1948. In 1956, Associated Artists Productions ("a.a.p.") acquired the distribution rights to Warners' pre-August 1948 color cartoons. United Artists acquired a.a.p. in 1958 and thereby gained the rights to the aforementioned Warners cartoons; this is why United Artists distributed Bugs Bunny: Superstar and why Warner's compilation films of the 1970s and 1980s did not feature any pre-August 1948 cartoons. (Warner eventually re-acquired the rights to its pre-August 1948 cartoons after the 1996 Time Warner-Turner merger.) Larry Jackson sought, unsuccessfully, to feature post-July 1948 Warners cartoons in his film.

Jackson had cultivated a friendship with Orson Welles and originally intended the bridging material of Bugs Bunny: Superstar to be a parody of Welles' Citizen Kane (1941). Welles' reluctance towards that idea ensured that Jackson's film would be a straightforward documentary; however, Welles did agree to provide narration for the film. The audio quality of Welles' narration was muffled, which did not escape the notice of critics. Writing for The New York Times, Vincent Canby remarked that "Orson Welles bridges the gaps with facetious narration that sounds as if it had been left on someone's Phone-Mate." Larry Jackson later revealed he was unaware that Welles had recorded his lines in stereo. Only one track of Welles' recording – from the microphone that was furthest away – was used in the film's final mix, accounting for the relatively poor audio quality of the narration.

Upon its theatrical release, Bugs Bunny: Superstar was marketed with the tagline, "You won't believe how much you missed as a kid!" According to Larry Jackson, this was a reference to how audiences accustomed to watching Warner Bros. cartoons on television were unaware of the history behind those cartoons. Jackson commented that Bugs Bunny: Superstar outgrossed The Rocky Horror Picture Show during its original run. Jackson also recounts being personally complimented by Paul Simon, who was a fan of the film.

== Controversy ==
Contemporary critics pointed out that Clampett's important role as one of the primary developers of the early Warner cartoons was being presented in a noticeably slanted way due to his prominent role in Superstar. In an audio commentary recorded for the 2012 DVD release, Jackson claimed that in order to secure Clampett's participation and have access to Clampett's collection of Warner Bros. history (memorabilia, drawings, films, photographs etc.), he had to sign a contract that stipulated Clampett would host the documentary, select the featured cartoons, and have final cut approval. Jackson further claimed that Clampett was very reluctant to speak about the other directors and their contributions, and that Clampett was "insecure" about his place in the legacy of Warner Bros. cartoons. (Clampett joined Warners' animation studio in 1931, became a director in 1937, and left the studio in May 1945. Therefore, none of the Warners cartoons he worked on were included in The Bugs Bunny Show or Warners' other animation anthology shows that ran on television, which only featured cartoons Warners retained the rights to, i.e. from 1948 to 1969.) For several of the cartoons featured in Bugs Bunny: Superstar, the "Blue Ribbon" versions were used – these lack opening titles (and thus do not show the director credits). However, for the three cartoons Clampett did direct, the original versions were used, causing Clampett's director credit to be shown.

The documentary infuriated many Warner Bros. artists, since Clampett took credit for several iconic Warner Bros. characters. Clampett implied that he was the creator of Bugs Bunny, claiming that he used Clark Gable's carrot-eating scene in It Happened One Night as inspiration for the character. Subsequently, Chuck Jones pointedly left out Clampett's name in the 1979 compilation film The Bugs Bunny/Road Runner Movie when Bugs discusses his "fathers" (i.e. directors Jones, Tex Avery, Friz Freleng, and Robert McKimson; writers Tedd Pierce, Warren Foster, and Michael Maltese; and voice artist Mel Blanc). Although Jones opted to not contribute to Superstar, Jackson claimed he remained friends with Jones for many years.

The release of Bugs Bunny: Superstar brought to a head resentments that had grown between Jones and Clampett for years. In June 1969, animation historian Michael Barrier interviewed Clampett for an article that appeared in issue #12 of Funnyworld magazine (fall 1970). In the course of the interview, Clampett implied or outright claimed to be the creator of characters such as Bugs Bunny, Daffy Duck, Porky Pig, Sniffles, and Yosemite Sam. The publication of this interview, as well as the release of Bugs Bunny: Superstar, drew the ire of Jones, who responded by writing a letter (dated 11 December 1975) and enlisting Avery to make annotations (dated 22 December 1975). Jones's letter, which was publicly circulated, refers to "the grossly unfair misrepresentations of BUGS BUNNY SUPER STAR", adding,

...[Larry] Jackson may have acted in innocence though [Michael] Barrier insists on the Clampett version even in the face of protests from Tex, Friz and me. Well, innocence and stubbornness are equal thieves in the night when they steal the good names of good men, particularly Tex Avery and Friz Freleng who together forged the style and character of Warner Bros. animated films until some of the rest of us grew up and realized how fortunate we were to find ourselves in such an environment.

For his part, Barrier stated in a 1992 essay that both Jones and Clampett were enthusiastic self-promoters, adding that "more hazardous to the interviewer was their fundamentally innocent tendency to take for granted that they stood at the center of the Warner cartoon universe".

== Release ==
Bugs Bunny: Superstar was released theatrically by United Artists on December 19, 1975 to fairly positive reception.

=== Home media ===
Bugs Bunny: Superstar was released on LaserDisc and VHS/Betamax format during the late 1980s by media company MGM/UA Home Video. The Turner logo doesn't feature in the film, but the United Artists logo features in the film instead.

On November 14, 2006, Warner Home Video released the documentary as a two-part special feature in the box set Looney Tunes Golden Collection: Volume 4. While most of the individual cartoons had been previously released as separate, refurbished entries in the Golden Collection series, Bugs Bunny: Superstar was not restored, with some age wear apparent from the original film stock. All but two cartoons were replaced by versions created by Turner Entertainment Co. in 1995. The Old Grey Hare used an original a.a.p. print (evidenced by the a.a.p. opening soundtrack) to preserve the ending gag involving the "That's all, Folks" title card, which was lost in the Turner updated version. I Taw a Putty Tat was also restored to the a.a.p. print, as the Turner version contained an edit to remove a blackface gag. Aside from leaving in the edited scene, however, the print on the set is basically the same as the Turner version.

On November 15, 2012, [mWarner Home Video released the entire documentary on DVD via the Warner Archive Collection. This version includes audio commentary by Larry Jackson. Reviewing the Bugs Bunny: Superstar DVD in 2012, animation writer Thad Komorowski wrote,

As [Larry] Jackson reminds us, hardly anything on the Warner cartoons had been written in the dark world of the mid-1970s, and the directors had every right to toot their own horns. Jackson is too gracious to say so, but Bugs Bunny Superstar was, unquestionably, a method of Clampett's to spin the gospel of Looney Tunes his own way... The final film is entertaining, and certainly not malicious in its short shrifts to the other directors. It was more or less a celluloid version of Bob Clampett himself: largely accurate, positively endearing, and takes for granted that the sun shone out of Bob Clampett's every orifice at Termite Terrace when it often didn't. It was a low-budget thing, its sole purpose to make people view the Warner cartoons beyond Saturday morning treacle.

== See also ==
- List of American films of 1975
- Golden Age of American animation
- Compilation film
