= Goofy Groceries =

1941 film by Robert Clampett

- Directed by: Robert Clampett
- Story by: Melvin Millar
- Produced by: Leon Schlesinger
- Starring: Mel Blanc; Sara Berner; Kent Rogers; Jack Lescoulie (all uncredited)
- Music by: Carl W. Stalling
- Animation by: Vive Risto
- Color process: Technicolor
- Production company: Leon Schlesinger Productions
- Distributed by: Warner Bros. Pictures
- Release date: March 29, 1941
- Running time: 9 min
- Country: United States
- Language: English

Goofy Groceries is a 1941 American animated comedy short film directed by Robert Clampett. The short was released on March 29, 1941. It is part of the Merrie Melodies series, Clampett's first Technicolor cartoon, as well as his first not to star Porky Pig.

== Plot ==
One winter night in a grocery store, whose owner has just closed the shop. The mascots on the labels of the food products come to life and perform various song and dance numbers.

First, a cow for "Contented Milk" sings to a "Fulla Bull Tobacco" bull "If I Could Be with You", while two other cows on cans reading "Discontented Milk" ogle and whistle at the bull. Meanwhile, a crab imitating Ned Sparks states "This love stuff makes me sick!", after which a rabbit named Jack Bunny (a parody of Jack Benny and also a same name from I Love to Singa) tells the music maestro (a dish mop caricaturing Leopold Stokowski) to start up, and a label for "Big Top Popcorn" comes to life while a dog barker for "Barker's Dog Food" addresses the crowd and introduces each of the circus's attractions including "Little Egypt Wiggly Gum", "Billy Posie's Aquackade" swimmers (a parody of Footlight Parade's "By a Waterfall"), and the "Tomato Can Can Dancers".

Meanwhile, an "Animal Crackers" gorilla named Henry hears the noise and starts growling, at one point stating to the audience that was he repulsive. Henry stares at the Can Can Dancers and begins his attack while attempting to abduct one of the dancers; Jack sees this and rides a bottle of "Horse Radish" while an army of "Navy Beans" and "Turtle Soup Turtles" shoots at Henry, who defends himself with a Roman candle while at one point destroying the bottle of Horse Radish that Jack is riding. Jack sees a box of "Chocolate-Covered A1 Cherries" and snatches the axe on the label amid cheering from an army of chicks, at which point Henry shoots the axe with the candle causing it to shrink.

As Jack dons a sheepish grin and backs into a corner, Superguy, the superhero resembling Superman on a box of "Superguy Soap Chips", comes to life at the sight of Henry lighting a stick of dynamite with Jack's cigar. Superguy flies up to Henry, but Henry scares Superguy that turns the latter into his weak baby form. Then, as Henry is about to kill Jack with the dynamite in his hand, Henry's mother called out her son, causing Henry to pause and run towards his mother, becoming meek while his mother drags him away by his ear, harshly chastising Henry for his naughty behaviors as he pleads for mercy.

Jack breathes a sigh of relief, only to realize he's still holding the dynamite, which explodes leaving him in blackface. After being exploded on, he then concludes the short with an Eddie Rochester impression.

== Home media ==
The cartoon is available restored, uncut, and uncensored on Disc 2 of the 2005 DVD Looney Tunes Golden Collection: Volume 3.
