= Polar Pals =

1939 film by Robert Clampett

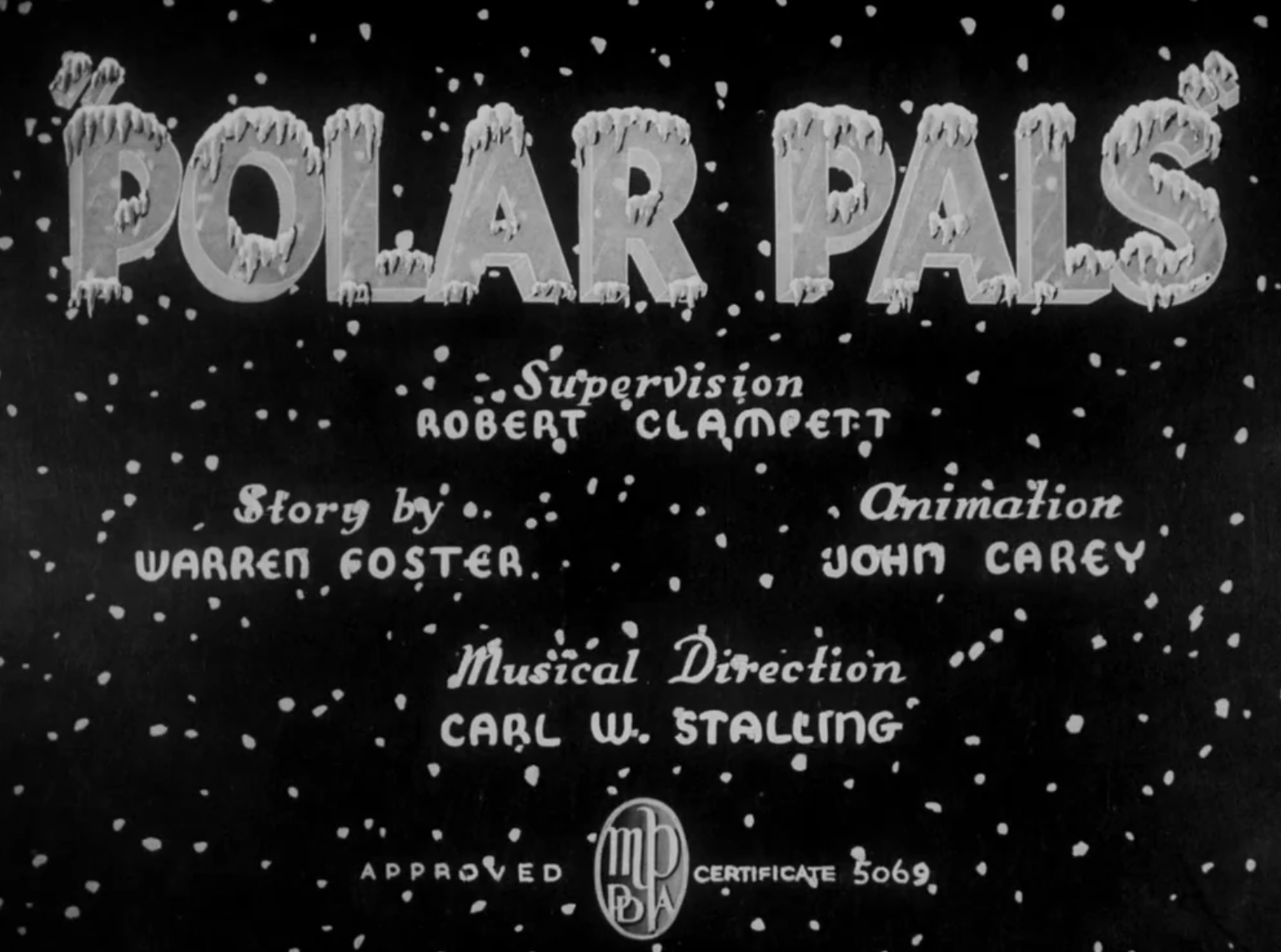
- Title card
- Directed by: Robert Clampett
- Story by: Warren Foster
- Produced by: Leon Schlesinger
- Starring: Mel Blanc
- Music by: Carl W. Stalling
- Animation by: John Carey
- Color process: Black-and-white
- Production company: Leon Schlesinger Productions
- Distributed by: Warner Bros. Pictures
- Release date: June 3, 1939
- Running time: 6 min
- Country: United States
- Language: English

Polar Pals is a 1939 American animated comedy short film directed by Robert Clampett. The short was released on June 3, 1939. It is part of the Looney Tunes series and the 58th cartoon to feature Porky Pig.

== Plot ==
Porky Pig lives in the North Pole with several polar bears. The polar bears sleep on him like blankets and leave one by one as it is time for Porky to wake up. He "showers" in water that freeze instantly and dances his way to work while the local fauna interact with each other humorously.

Fur trapper I. Killem arrives on his ship by slicing an iceberg in half. He launches cannonballs at sea lions for their fur, as well as a sheet of ice that falls on Porky. He shoots at a penguin whose shadow is hit but not its body, as well as a drunken walrus who is unaware of his wounds, from which alcohol leak out. He kills multiple penguins with a giant cannonball that functions like a bowling ball, as well as some animals with guns who are humorously turned into a cozy hunting lodge. Porky returns fire and turns the iceberg behind I. Killem into a mallet, which hits him and causes him to flee to his boat. Porky sinks his boat, after which I. Killem attempts to escape on what seems to be a canoe, only to find a whale who sends him flying to his death on a distant iceberg. Porky celebrates but falls into the water and is frozen solid.

== Home media ==
DVD:

- Looney Tunes Golden Collection: Volume 5
- Porky Pig 101

== See also ==
- Porky Pig filmography
- Looney Tunes and Merrie Melodies filmography (1930–1939)
