= Wacky Blackout =

1942 film by Robert Clampett

- Title card
- Directed by: Robert Clampett
- Story by: Warren Foster
- Produced by: Leon Schlesinger
- Starring: Mel Blanc
- Music by: Carl W. Stalling
- Animation by: Sid Sutherland
- Color process: Black-and-white
- Production company: Leon Schlesinger Productions
- Distributed by: Warner Bros. Pictures
- Release date: July 11, 1942
- Running time: 7 min
- Country: United States
- Language: English

Wacky Blackout is a 1942 American animated comedy short film directed by Robert Clampett. The short was released on July 11, 1942. It is part of the Looney Tunes series.

== Plot ==
Full short

The cartoon, set on a farm during World War II, features a series of disconnected gags:

- The narrator describes a farmer's preparations for war, including a dog trained to put out fires by spitting.
- A cow laments her high milk production, which is taken from her daily.
- A turkey tries to lose weight to avoid being cooked for dinner.
- Turtle eggs hatch, revealing one turtle claiming to be a jeep.
- A blackout-loving dog gets lipstick stains during a blackout prank.
- Glum caterpillars cheer up after one gets a retread.
- Fireflies practice a blackout, while an adult turtle is afraid of the dark.
- A bird wants to be a dive bomber, mimicking airplane sounds.
- The narrator notes that the famous swallows of Capistrano avoid war, but a telegram reveals they are stranded over the ocean.
- Elderly carrier pigeons sing about giving their sons to war, while a woodpecker continually pecks a cat's tail.

== Home media ==
Wacky Blackout is available on Looney Tunes Golden Collection: Volume 6, Disc 2.

== See also ==
- Looney Tunes and Merrie Melodies filmography (1940–1949)
- List of animated films in the public domain in the United States
