= Wise Quacks =

1939 film by Robert Clampett

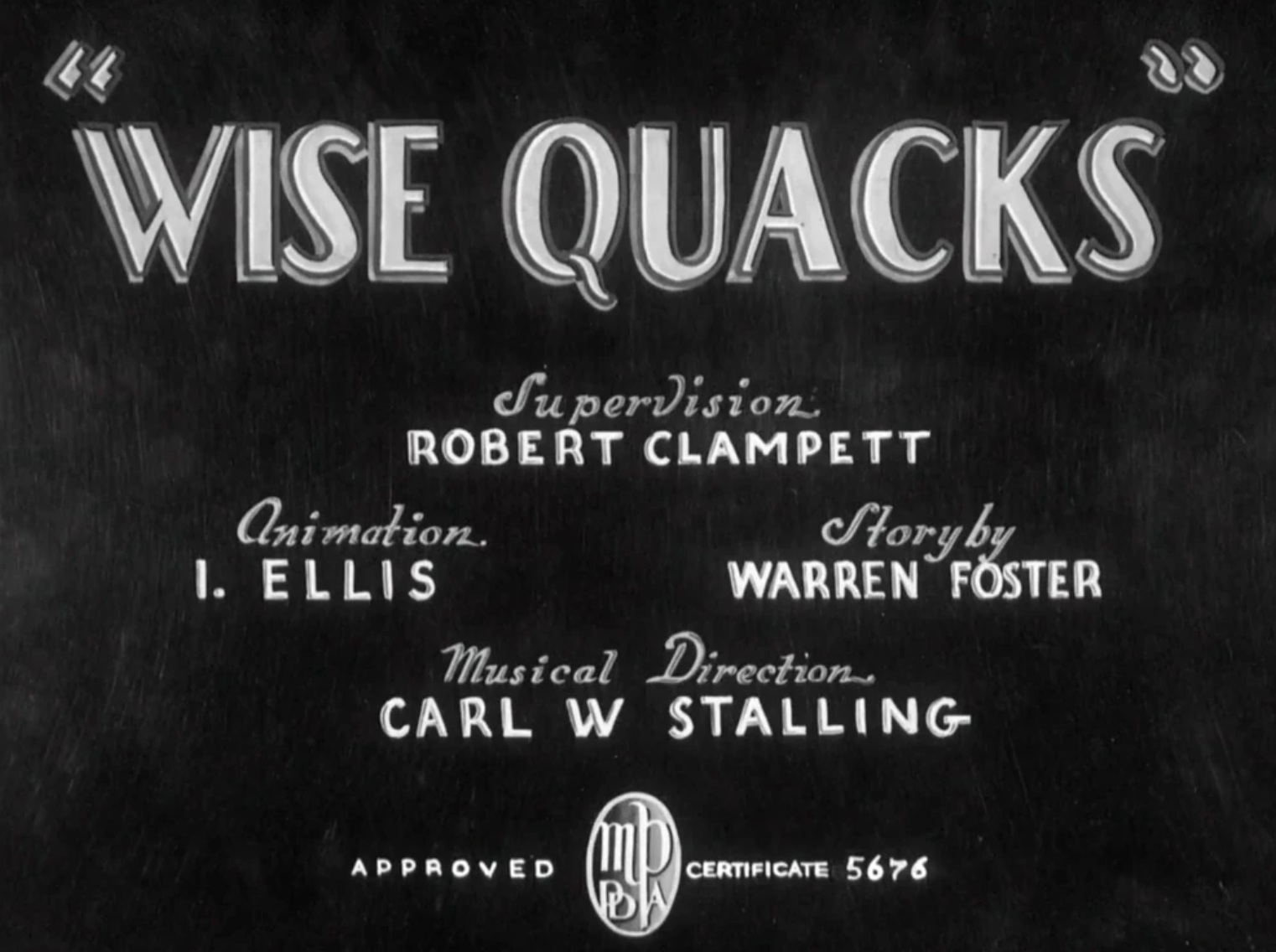
- Title card
- Directed by: Robert Clampett
- Story by: Warren Foster
- Produced by: Leon Schlesinger
- Starring: Mel Blanc
- Music by: Carl W. Stalling
- Animation by: Isadore Ellis
- Color process: Black-and-white
- Production company: Leon Schlesinger Productions
- Distributed by: Warner Bros. Pictures
- Release date: July 29, 1939
- Running time: 7 min
- Country: United States
- Language: English

Wise Quacks is a 1939 American animated comedy short film directed by Robert Clampett. It was released on July 29, 1939. It is part of the Looney Tunes series, the 62nd cartoon to feature Porky Pig and the ninth cartoon to feature Daffy Duck.

== Plot ==
Daffy is surprised by his wife with the news that she has several eggs waiting to be hatched, revealing it by handing Daffy a small shirt. Porky is excited upon discovering it in the newspaper. Daffy worries about the event while drinking moonshine he hid under a tree. Three of the four eggs hatch as Daffy's wife heats her buttocks to warm the eggs. Porky finds a duckling who had not hatched and assists him; Porky asks the duckling if he recognizes Porky as his father, which he denies despite nodding. Daffy's wife is furious that Daffy is drunk.

An eagle gives the duckling a "ride", which he accepts despite shaking his head. Daffy's wife is horrified by the news and notifies her husband, who inadvertently reveals his moonshine supply to power himself, as he flies to the eagle's location. He stops the eagle in his tracks and rescues his son as he is chased by the eagle's friends, but drops his son who is then rescued by Porky. Porky, Daffy's wife and the duckling are shocked to find Daffy drunk with the eagles, which his wife reacts by shattering the jar of moonshine.

== Voice Cast ==
- Mel Blanc as Daffy Duck / Porky Pig / Dog / Ducklings / Eagle / Drunken Eagles singing
- Bob Clampett as Mrs. Daffy Duck (uncomfirmed)

== Home media ==
- DVD 2007 - Looney Tunes Golden Collection: Volume 5 (restored) - Warner Home Video
- DVD 2017 - Porky Pig 101 (restored) - Warner Archive Collection

== See also ==
- Daffy Duck filmography
- Porky Pig filmography
- Looney Tunes and Merrie Melodies filmography (1930–1939)
