= The Old Grey Hare =

1944 film by Bob Clampett

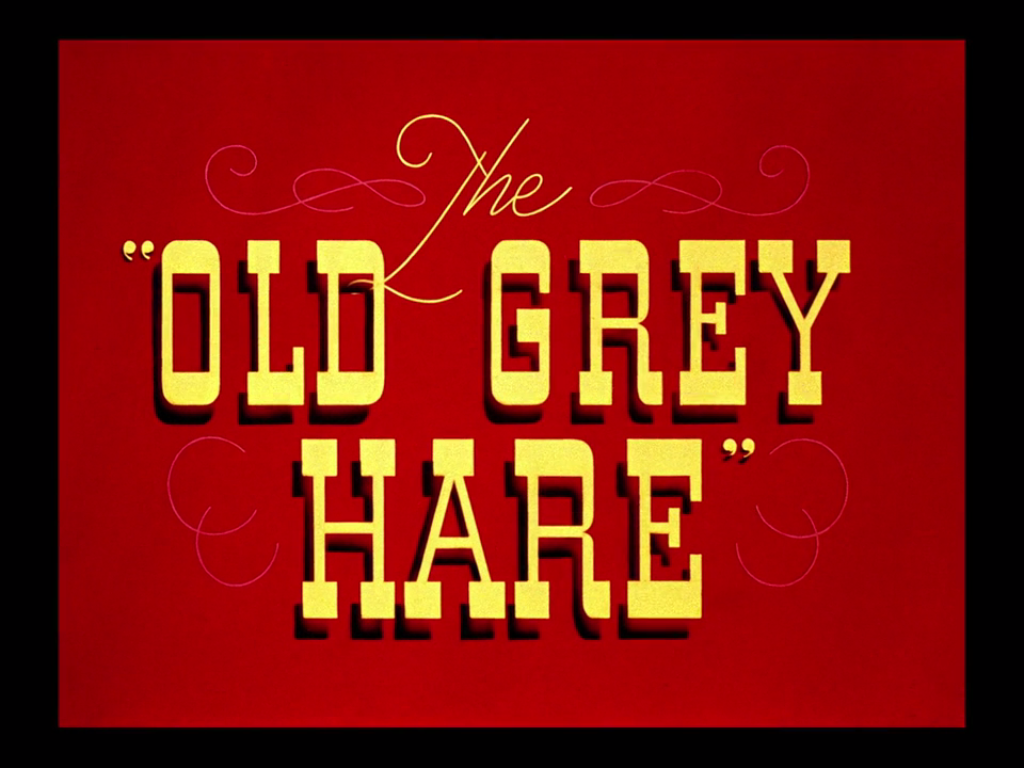
- Title card
- Directed by: Robert Clampett
- Story by: Michael Sasanoff
- Starring: Mel Blanc; Arthur Q. Bryan
- Music by: Carl W. Stalling
- Animation by: Robert McKimson
- Color process: Technicolor
- Production company: Warner Bros. Cartoons, Inc.
- Distributed by: Warner Bros. Pictures; The Vitaphone Corporation
- Release date: October 28, 1944
- Running time: 7:36
- Language: English

The Old Grey Hare is a 1944 Merrie Melodies cartoon directed by Bob Clampett. The short was released on October 28, 1944, and features Bugs Bunny and Elmer Fudd, voiced by Mel Blanc and Arthur Q. Bryan respectively.

== Plot ==
After Elmer Fudd starts crying over his failure to catch Bugs Bunny, the voice of God (Mel Blanc) tells Elmer to keep trying to catch him and not give up. Being transported to the year 2000, Elmer finds a year 2000 newspaper, with pages revolving around Bing Crosby's horse, the replacement for television, etc. He and Bugs then continue their pursuit old and wrinkled, with Elmer now armed with a futuristic gun. In a brief chase, due to their ages Elmer gets the upper hand, shooting Bugs with his weapon, with pinball effects. A flashback sequence features Elmer and Bugs as babies with their possible first pursuit. After the flashback ends, with Bugs and Elmer being equally emotional, Elmer is buried alive by Bugs. Elmer remarks to the camera that Bugs is finally out of his life forever. Bugs pops into the screen and quips: "Well now I wouldn't say that," kisses Elmer as usual, hands him a large firecracker, lights the fuse and quickly departs. The panicked Elmer scrambles, and the screen irises out with the firecracker still hissing. A "That's all, folks!" title card appears, and the firecracker explodes off screen, shaking the title card, and leaving Elmer's fate unknown.

== Title ==
The title is a double play on words. One is the typical pun between "hare" and "hair", with the bunny (who was already grey-haired) rendered "old and grey" for this cartoon. The title also refers to the old song, "The Old Gray Mare". Some of the lobby cards for this cartoon gave the alternate spelling, The Old Gray Hare.

== Reception ==
Animation historian Greg Ford writes, "In the last two or three years before Robert Clampett abruptly left the Warner Bros. cartoon studio in the mid 1940s, the renegade director surrendered an unwieldy bunch of late-blooming, oddly self-reflexive masterworks. Clampett's craving for summation reaches epochal proportions in The Old Grey Hare, as Elmer is fast-forwarded all the way to the year 2000 (gasp!). So comically premature is Clampett's yen for retrospection that he essays a cradle-to-grave biopic of Bugs Bunny and Elmer Fudd, reminiscing over their longstanding relationship, even though the pair had only existed onscreen for about four years at the time."

== Home media ==
- VHS – Viddy-Oh! For Kids Cartoon Festivals: Bugs Bunny Cartoon Festival Featuring "Little Red Riding Rabbit"
- VHS – Viddy-Oh! For Kids Cartoon Festivals: Bugs Bunny and Elmer Fudd Cartoon Festival Featuring "Wabbit Twouble"
- LaserDisc – The Golden Age of Looney Tunes, Vol. 1, Side 10: The Art of Bugs
- VHS – The Golden Age of Looney Tunes, Vol. 10: The Art of Bugs
- VHS – Looney Tunes: The Collectors Edition Volume 7: Welcome To Wackyland
- VHS, DVD – Bugs Bunny: Superstar
- DVD – Looney Tunes Golden Collection: Volume 4, Disc 2 (Bugs Bunny: Superstar, Part 2) (Associated Artists Productions print)
- DVD – Looney Tunes Golden Collection: Volume 5, Disc 3
- DVD – The Essential Bugs Bunny, Disc 1
- Blu-ray, DVD – Looney Tunes Platinum Collection: Volume 1, Disc 1
- Blu-ray – Bugs Bunny 80th Anniversary Collection, Disc 1

== Censorship ==
- When this cartoon aired on The WB, the part where baby Elmer points his toy gun at baby Bugs' face and baby Bugs cracks his bottle of carrot juice over baby Elmer's head was cut.

== See also ==
- Baby Looney Tunes
- Born to Peck
- Little Go Beep
- I Am My Lifetime
- Bygone Errors
- The Secret Origin of Denzel Crocker
- Father Time! (episode)
- Bugs Bunny filmography
- Elmer Fudd filmography
- Looney Tunes and Merrie Melodies filmography (1940–1949)

Preceded by Buckaroo Bugs	Bugs Bunny Cartoons; 1944	Succeeded by Stage Door Cartoon
