= Prehistoric Porky =

1940 film by Robert Clampett

- Title card
- Directed by: Robert Clampett
- Story by: Melvin Millar
- Produced by: Leon Schlesinger
- Starring: Mel Blanc
- Music by: Carl W. Stalling
- Animation by: John Carey
- Color process: Black-and-white
- Production company: Leon Schlesinger Productions
- Distributed by: Warner Bros. Pictures
- Release date: October 12, 1940
- Running time: 7 min
- Country: United States
- Language: English

Prehistoric Porky is a 1940 American animated comedy short film directed by Robert Clampett. It was released on October 12, 1940. It is part of the Looney Tunes and the 79th cartoon to feature Porky Pig.

== Plot ==
In "One Billion, Trillion B.C.", dinosaurs roam the land. Porky Pig inhabits a cave, above which a vulture screams before singing with three dinosaurs. He attempts to play fetch with his pet dinosaur, who is comically oversized yet acts like a dog. He shakes his tail and causes the nearby fauna to leave in fear as it destroys trees. The commotion stops when the dinosaur receives his bone.

Porky tears up bills and reads a magazine from his mailbox, envying other cavemen's clothes. Porky goes hunting with his oversized club and wanders into the wild. He kicks a dinosaur's toe and terrifies others with his club. He finds a big cat and tries to kill it after noticing its fur's beauty, but is smacked by the cat instead.

A sabertooth lion finds food and discovers Porky walking. Porky notices it and is not scared until he fails to club the beast. His club is eaten and turned into pegs. Porky runs from the beast and is cornered. He apologizes to the beast for attempting to kill it, only for it to offer to sell a suit of his own.

== Home media ==
Prehistoric Porky is available on disc 3 of the Looney Tunes Golden Collection: Volume 5 DVD set, and on disc 4 of the Porky Pig 101 DVD set.

== See also ==
- Porky Pig filmography
- Looney Tunes and Merrie Melodies filmography (1940–1949)
