= Tom Thumb in Trouble =

1940 film by Charles Jones

- Directed by: Charles Jones
- Story by: Rich Hogan
- Produced by: Leon Schlesinger
- Starring: Mel Blanc
- Music by: Carl W. Stalling
- Animation by: Robert Cannon
- Color process: Technicolor
- Production company: Leon Schlesinger Productions
- Distributed by: Warner Bros. Pictures
- Release date: June 8, 1940
- Running time: 8 min
- Country: United States
- Language: English

Tom Thumb in Trouble is a 1940 American animated comedy short film directed by Charles Jones. The short was released on June 8, 1940. It is part of the Merrie Melodies series. It was re-released as a "Blue Ribbon" reissue in 1949, rendering the original film and credits lost. Tom's father in the film would reappear in The Day the Earth Blew Up as Farmer Jim, a character who helped raise Porky Pig and Daffy Duck in the film. John Kricfalusi considered the film to be one of Jones' best, praising its sentimental nature despite his usual aversion to Disney-esque cartoons.

== Plot ==
Tom Thumb lives with his woodchopper father, struggling to turn off an alarm clock until his father intervenes. He is bathed in a small puddle of water and drinks from a cup half his size before his father leaves for work. He helps clean the kitchen with various contraptions, but accidentally slips into a bowl of soapy water with no way to escape. A yellow bird who flies outside the house hears his call for help and saves him by shattering the window. His father hears the commotion and believes that the bird attacked Tom Thumb, chasing it out of the window. Tom leaves at night to find the bird at the midst of a snowstorm after writing a note for his father. As Tom's father is overwhelmed with grief upon discovering, the yellow bird saves Tom from the freezing cold. As thanks, Tom's father allows the bird to sleep on his beard.

== Home media ==
This short can be found on Disc 2 of the 2007 DVD set Looney Tunes Golden Collection: Volume 5.
