= The Hep Cat =

1942 film by Robert Clampett

- Blue Ribbon reissue title card
- Directed by: Robert Clampett
- Story by: Warren Foster
- Produced by: Leon Schlesinger
- Starring: Mel Blanc
- Music by: Carl W. Stalling
- Animation by: Bob McKimson
- Color process: Technicolor
- Production company: Leon Schlesinger Productions
- Distributed by: Warner Bros. Pictures
- Release date: October 3, 1942
- Running time: 6 min
- Country: United States
- Language: English

The Hep Cat is a 1942 American animated comedy short film directed by Robert Clampett. The short was released on October 3, 1942. It is notable as the first Looney Tunes cartoon to be in Technicolor, as the series was previously reserved for black and white cartoons featuring established characters; it officially loses any distinction with the Merrie Melodies series from this point until both series are retired. It was re-released as a "Blue Ribbon" reissue in 1949, rendering the original film lost, though Clampett kept the credits cel and background.

== Plot ==
A music-loving stray cat stumbles across a dog named Rosebud, who gives chase. The cat, after a successful escape, begins singing a parody of "Java Jive". A little red bird encourages Rosebud to continue his pursuits. Later, the cat encounters an attractive female cat, and attempts to woo her, failing utterly. A package containing flowers and a lipstick-kissed note is tossed over the fence; the note invites the cat to rendezvous with "guess who?" on the other side of the fence. He prances over and comes face-to-face with Rosebud. The chase resumes.

At one point, the dog uses a puppet version of the female cat of Hep Cat's dreams to trap him. The cat is fooled and again the dog pursues him. After a series of zany sight gags, the cat once again evades Rosebud and humiliates him. The cat continues to romance the puppet despite knowing the truth, much to the red bird's disgust.

== Voice cast ==
- Mel Blanc as the Hep Cat
- Sara Berner as Cat Puppet, Bird
- Kent Rogers as Rosebud

== Reception ==
Comic book and animation writer Earl Kress writes, "This cartoon is one of director Bob Clampett's bat-out-of-hell-paced efforts... There's some really nice staging in this cartoon—for example, the scenes in which we only see shadows on a fence and the scene where the cat and dog race up a fire escape, shown at a steep down-angle from the top of a building. The staging, plus the outstanding script by Warren Foster, make this one of the greatest Looney Tunes."
