= Hare Ribbin' =

1944 animated short film by Robert Clampett

- Lobby card
- Directed by: Robert Clampett
- Story by: Lou Lilly
- Produced by: Leon Schlesinger
- Music by: Carl W. Stalling
- Animation by: Bob McKimson
- Color process: Technicolor
- Production company: Leon Schlesinger Productions
- Distributed by: Warner Bros. Pictures; The Vitaphone Corporation
- Release date: June 24, 1944
- Running time: 7:44 (original theatrical version); 8:01 (director's cut version)
- Language: English

Hare Ribbin' is a 1944 animated short film in the Merrie Melodies series, directed by Robert Clampett and featuring Bugs Bunny. The plot features Bugs' conflict with a red-haired hound dog, whom the rabbit sets out to evade and make a fool of using one-liners, reverse psychology, disguises and other tricks. It was released in theaters by Warner Bros. Pictures on June 24, 1944. The title is a pun on "hair ribbon".

It is also the first Warner Bros. cartoon to include Bugs' head in the opening title sequence.

== Plot ==
A dog with a Russian accent (reminiscent of comedian Bert Gordon's "Mad Russian" persona), sets out to hunt a rabbit. However, his plans are foiled when he encounters Bugs Bunny, who proceeds to tease and outwit him. When the dog sniffs Bugs, he reaches Bugs' armpit and turns to the audience, breaking the fourth wall and uses the tag line from Lifebuoy soap.

The chase leads them to a lake, where the action continues underwater. Bugs continues to outsmart the dog with various antics, including disguising himself as a mermaid and Elmer Fudd. Eventually, Bugs tricks the dog into believing he has died after the dog demands a rabbit sandwich. The dog, overcome with grief, wishes that he was dead too, prompting Bugs to "grant" his wish in a comical twist.

As Bugs dances away, seemingly victorious, the dog unexpectedly sits up, revealing he is still alive, and humorously comments on his misfortune.

== Analysis ==
Michael S. Shull and David E. Wilt consider it ambiguous if this cartoon contain a World War II-related reference. While underwater, Bugs disguises himself as a mermaid. The dog transforms into a torpedo to pursue "her".

The two alternate versions of the ending were based on a stipulation by a higher-up that Bugs could not be seen attempting to kill another animal.

== Censorship and alternative endings ==
The two alternate endings to Hare Ribbin'. Both endings portray the dog's demise through gun violence, a depiction now deemed too severe for family audiences.

Hare Ribbin', known for its two controversial endings, presents the Russian Dog character grappling with guilt over Bugs Bunny's apparent demise. In the original theatrical ending, Bugs hands the dog a gun to end his own life so he can shoot himself in the head, a scene that has been removed from television broadcasts but aired uncensored on select occasions. The "director's cut" ending depicts Bugs pulling out a gun and shooting the dog through the mouth, a version never shown theatrically or on television until its release on the Looney Tunes Golden Collection: Volume 5 DVD set.

Additional scenes in the director's cut include an extended search for Bugs by the dog, and an enhanced sequence of them playing tag. Notably, a scene where Bugs avoids being eaten by the dog is absent from the director's cut, suggesting it may have been a later addition before the theatrical release.

== Home media ==
The Golden Age of Looney Tunes Volume 5 laserdisc set has the "director's cut" version of this cartoon, unrestored. The fifth volume of the Looney Tunes Golden Collection DVD set and the Bugs Bunny 80th Anniversary Collection Blu-ray set have the original cut of Hare Ribbin', restored and remastered, and the director's cut as a special feature, unrestored and unremastered (the difference between both cuts can be determined by the tinting of the color).

== Sources ==
- Looney Tunes and Merrie Melodies: A Complete Illustrated Guide to the Warner Bros. Cartoons, by Jerry Beck and Will Friedwald (1989), Henry Holt, ISBN 0-8050-0894-2
- Looney Tunes Golden Collection, DVD set.
- Cohen, Karl F. (2004), "Censorship of Theatrical Animation", Forbidden Animation: Censored Cartoons and Blacklisted Animators in America, McFarland & Company, ISBN 978-0786420322
- Shull, Michael S.; Wilt, David E. (2004), "Appendix E.", Doing Their Bit: Wartime American Animated Short Films, 1939-1945, McFarland & Company, ISBN 978-0786481699

== See also ==
- Bugs Bunny filmography
- Looney Tunes and Merrie Melodies filmography (1940–1949)

Preceded by Bugs Bunny Nips the Nips	Bugs Bunny Cartoons; 1944	Succeeded by Hare Force
