= Farm Frolics =

1941 film by Robert Clampett

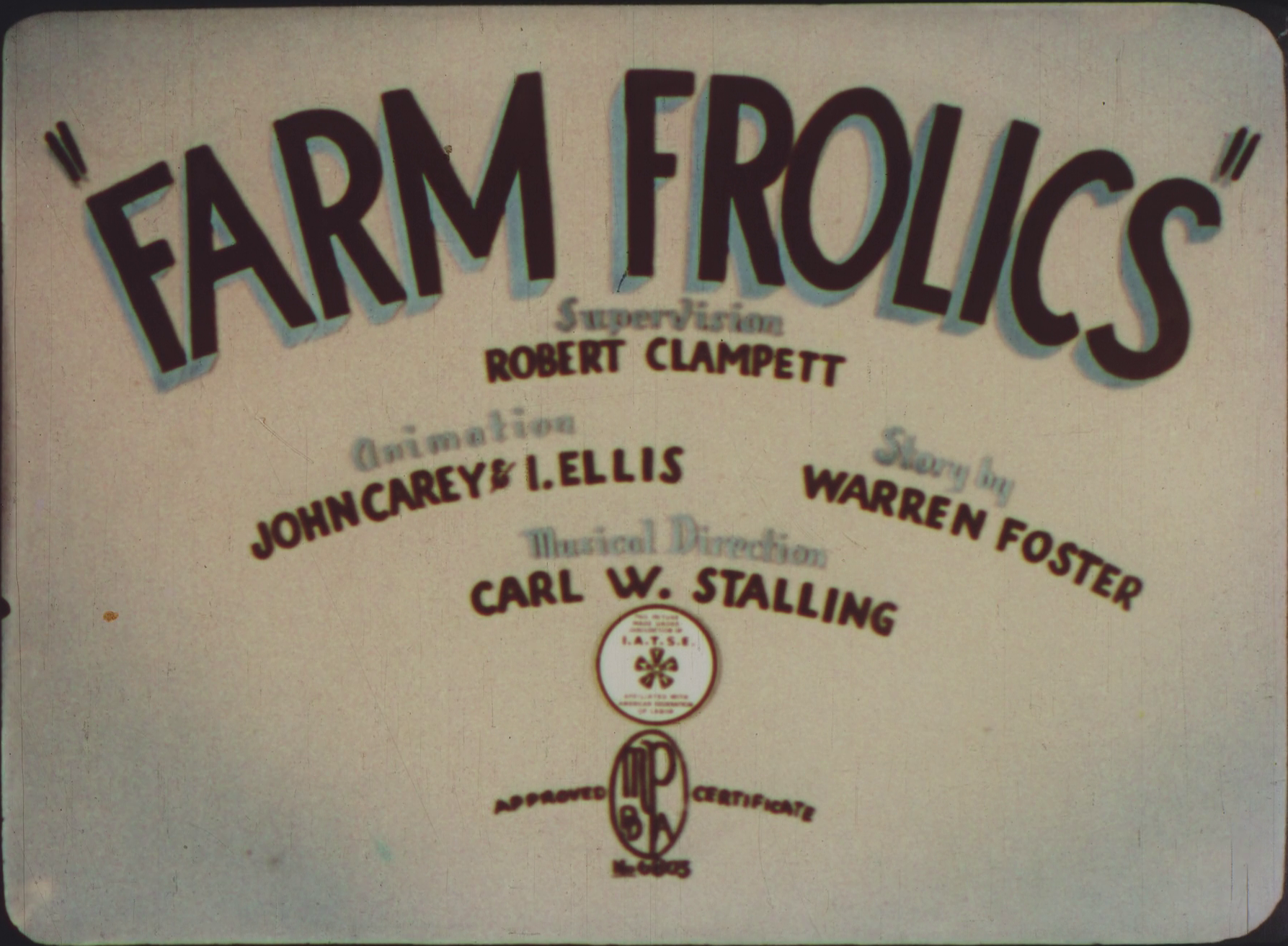
- Original title card
- Directed by: Robert Clampett
- Story by: Warren Foster
- Produced by: Leon Schlesinger
- Narrated by: Robert C. Bruce
- Music by: Carl W. Stalling
- Animation by: John Carey; Isadore Ellis
- Color process: Technicolor
- Production company: Leon Schlesinger Productions
- Distributed by: Warner Bros. Pictures
- Release date: May 10, 1941
- Running time: 8 min
- Country: United States
- Language: English

Farm Frolics is a 1941 American animated comedy short film directed by Robert Clampett. It was released on May 10, 1941. It is part of the Merrie Melodies series. It was re-released as a "Blue Ribbon" reissue in 1949; the original film and credits, alongside a deleted scene excised from the negatives, was lost for years until an original print was found in the Library of Congress. Due to the film being in the public domain, it was allowed to be released after Jerico Dvorak scanned the film.

== Plot ==
The cartoon with the original titles and the grasshopper scene

The cartoon starts with the arm of an animator drawing a farm scene which then colors itself, and the camera zooms in as a narrator begins:

- A realistic-looking horse is seen and introduced as a prize-winning show animal; he whinnies (courtesy of Mel Blanc), and a comic triple plays out: The narrator asks him to trot and he obliges. The narrator asks him to gallop and he obliges again. The narrator asks him to "canter" and he immediately changes into more of a cartoon, sporting the bugged eyes, hair, and general mannerisms of the vaudeville star Eddie Cantor singing (vocally impersonated by Cliff Nazarro) "I'm Happy About the Whole Thing" (by Harry Warren and Johnny Mercer). The narrator admonishes him, who returns to his original realistic styling and grins sheepishly.
- The "farmer's faithful old watchdog" is seen lazing on the porch; the narrator describes him as being "no longer very active" though "he still does a few little odd jobs around the house", one of these being fetching the newspaper. A whistle signals its arrival; he springs to alertness and makes a mad dash to the end of the driveway to retrieve it. After he brings it back to the porch, he spreads it out and begins reading the comics. He looks up at the audience and says, "I can hardly wait to see what happened to Dick Tracy!" (This gag would be used by Clampett again in The Great Piggy Bank Robbery.)
- A proud expectant mother hen lovingly covers her eggs and leaves them "sleeping" in her nest; a mean-looking weasel stealthily creeps into the henhouse. The narrator frets but, just as the weasel is about to grab the eggs, they all hatch at once. The newborn chicks shout "BOO!" in unison. The frightened weasel evokes a Joe Penner catch-phrase, "Don't ever DOOO that!" and, with his face turning green, gasps as his heart pounds, much to the amusement of the chicks.
- An owl nestled in a tree is hooting dully until it suddenly breaks into a smile and says, "Who's Yehoodi?"
- The narrator describes a pair of birds laboriously building their nest, "A little twig, a bit of string, and a piece of straw", over and over until they actually create a house, which is approved by the Federal Housing Administration. They then sing, "There's no place like home!"
- The narrator asks a worried-looking field mouse named Rosebud with huge ears what is troubling him and Rosebud says, "I don't know, Doc. I...I just keep hearing things."
- A grasshopper hops along a path, chewing a tobacco-like substance, and is about to spit it out into a spittoon-like plant when he looks at the audience and says, "Sorry, folks! The Hays Office won't let me do it!" (This gag was removed from the Blue Ribbon re-release.)
- Ants are seen coming, going, and communicating with each other around their anthill. The camera and mike zoom in to allow the viewer to understand the "language" a mother will use when she summons her young. We hear her shout, "Hen-REEEE!", to which her son replies, "Coming, Mother!" (the scene reminiscent of the catchphrase from the radio show, "The Aldrich Family").
- A cat and mouse are seen snuggled up together sleeping. The narrator remarks on this odd friendship. The mouse awakens and responds with nods to questions about the relationship. When asked by the narrator if he has anything he would like to say to his friends in the audience, he nods again, yells, "GET ME OUT OF HEEEEEEEEERE!!!!!!!!!", and escapes. A brief circle-around chase ends with the cat catching him, then returning to the cozy snuggling. He shrugs, apparently resigned to the situation.
- A running gag has seven piglets eagerly watching an alarm clock. When it finally hits 6pm, one of them bellows, "Dinnertime!" They dash off to their mother to the tune of the military bugle call "Mess Call". She braces for the onslaught as they pile into her side. Zooming in on her rather dejected face, she speaks to the audience in the manner of ZaSu Pitts, "Oh, dear. Every day, it's the same thing."

== Voice cast ==
- Mel Blanc as Farm Dog/Weasel/Owl/Rosebud/Grasshopper/Piggy
- Robert C. Bruce as the Narrator
- Cliff Nazarro as Eddie Cantor Horse
- Kent Rogers as Female Red Ant
- Sara Berner as Mama Pig

== Home media ==
The Blue Ribbon edition of this short is available on disc 3 of the Looney Tunes Golden Collection: Volume 5 DVD set.

== Reception ==
The Film Daily called the cartoon "good", saying, "There is no story to this Merrie Melodies but the comments of the animals as the audience is taken around the farm are highly amusing."

== See also ==
- Looney Tunes and Merrie Melodies filmography (1940–1949)
- List of animated films in the public domain in the United States
