= Buckaroo Bugs =

1944 short animated film by Bob Clampett

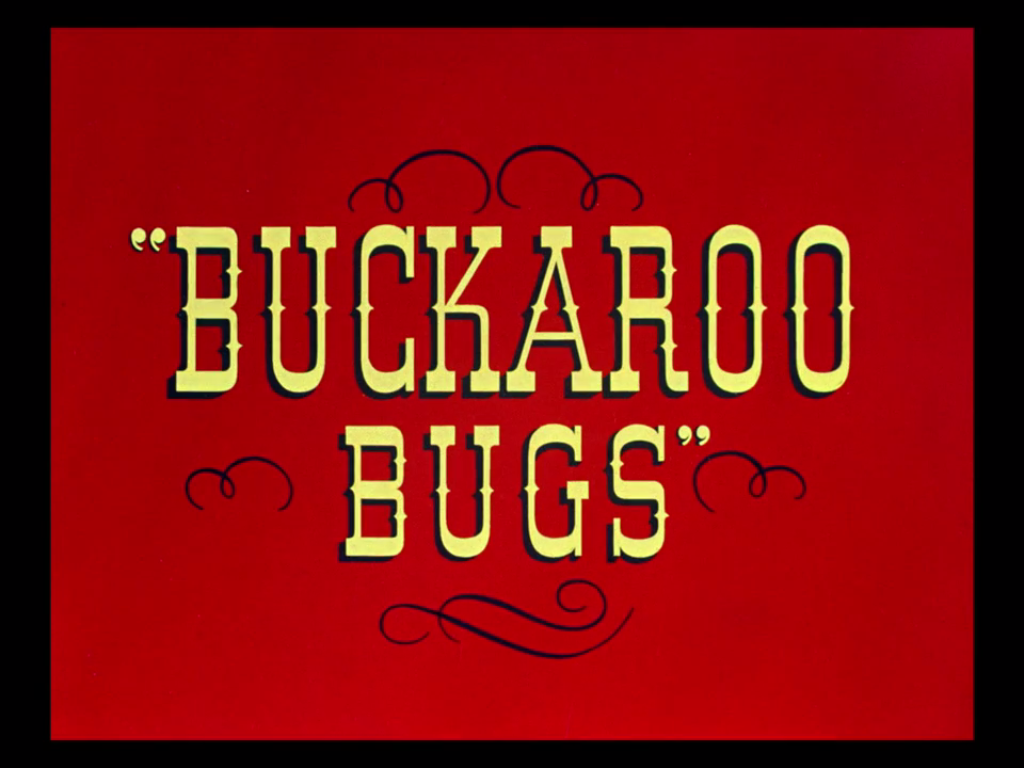
- Title card
- Directed by: Robert Clampett
- Story by: Lou Lilly
- Produced by: Leon Schlesinger
- Starring: Mel Blanc; Robert C. Bruce (unc.)
- Music by: Carl W. Stalling
- Animation by: Manny Gould
- Color process: Technicolor
- Production company: Leon Schlesinger Productions
- Distributed by: Warner Bros. Pictures; The Vitaphone Corporation
- Release date: August 26, 1944
- Running time: 8:44
- Language: English

Buckaroo Bugs is a 1944 American Western Looney Tunes cartoon film directed by Bob Clampett. The cartoon was released on August 26, 1944, and features Bugs Bunny in his official Looney Tunes debut.

== Plot ==
In the quaint town of San Fernando Alley, Bugs Bunny assumes the role of the Masked Marauder, a notorious carrot thief. Red Hot Ryder, tasked with apprehending the Marauder, repeatedly fails due to his inability to discern Bugs from the actual culprit. Despite eventually catching on, Ryder remains outsmarted by Bugs, who cleverly tricks him and his horse into plunging into the Grand Canyon. As the dust settles, Ryder finally realizes Bugs's true identity, culminating in a humorous revelation.

== Crew ==
- Direction: Robert Clampett
- Story: Lou Lilly
- Animation: Manny Gould (As M. Gould)
- Additional Animation: Robert McKimson, Rod Scribner, Basil Davidovich, A.C. Gamer (effects)
- Layouts and Backgrounds: Thomas McKimson and Michael Sasanoff
- Voice Actors: Mel Blanc, Robert C. Bruce
- Musical Direction: Carl W. Stalling
- Producer: Leon Schlesinger

== Home media ==
- VHS - Viddy-Oh! For Kids Cartoon Festivals: Bugs Bunny Cartoon Festival Featuring "Hold the Lion, Please"
- VHS - Bugs Bunny Collection: Bugs Bunny on Parade
- LaserDisc - The Golden Age of Looney Tunes, Vol. 2, Side 5: Bob Clampett
- VHS - Looney Tunes: The Collectors Edition Volume 7: Welcome To Wackyland
- DVD - Looney Tunes Golden Collection: Volume 5, Disc 3 (with two commentary tracks: one by Michael Barrier and the other by Spumco workers John Kricfalusi, Eddie Fitzgerald, and Kali Fontecchio)
- Blu-ray/DVD - Looney Tunes Platinum Collection: Volume 2, Disc 1 (with two commentary tracks: one by Michael Barrier and the other by Spumco workers John Kricfalusi, Eddie Fitzgerald, and Kali Fontecchio)

== See also ==
- Bugs Bunny filmography
- Looney Tunes and Merrie Melodies filmography (1940–1949)

Preceded by Hare Force	Bugs Bunny Cartoons; 1944	Succeeded by The Old Grey Hare
