= The Wacky Wabbit =

1942 film by Robert Clampett

- Title card
- Directed by: Robert Clampett
- Story by: Warren Foster
- Produced by: Leon Schlesinger
- Starring: Mel Blanc; Arthur Q. Bryan
- Music by: Carl W. Stalling
- Animation by: Sid Sutherland
- Color process: Technicolor
- Production company: Leon Schlesinger Productions
- Distributed by: Warner Bros. Pictures
- Release date: May 2, 1942
- Running time: 7 min
- Country: United States
- Language: English

The Wacky Wabbit is a 1942 American animated comedy short film directed by Robert Clampett. It is part of the Merrie Melodies series, the thirteenth cartoon to feature Bugs Bunny and the seventeenth cartoon to feature Elmer Fudd.

== Plot ==
In a desert during World War II, Elmer Fudd seeks gold for the Allied victory effort. He encounters Bugs Bunny, who plays pranks on him, including a dynamite exchange and a fake gold discovery. Elmer, oblivious to Bugs' antics, tries to retaliate but ends up buried by Bugs. Determined, Elmer retrieves what he believes is gold from Bugs' tooth by beginning to beat him up first, only to find it's his own. Unaware, he smiles triumphantly with a glimmer, hinting at his continued cluelessness.

== Home media ==
- VHS – Cartoon Moviestars: Elmer!, and Hollywood Cartoon Superstars - Volume 4
- Laserdisc – The Golden Age of Looney Tunes, Vol. 2, Side 5: Bob Clampett
- DVD – Looney Tunes Golden Collection: Volume 5, Disc 3

== See also ==
- List of animated films in the public domain in the United States
- Bugs Bunny filmography
- Elmer Fudd filmography
- Looney Tunes and Merrie Melodies filmography (1940–1949)

Preceded by Any Bonds Today?	Bugs Bunny Cartoons; 1942	Succeeded by Hold the Lion, Please
