= Porky's Picnic =

1939 film by Robert Clampett

- Directed by: Robert Clampett
- Story by: Warren Foster
- Produced by: Leon Schlesinger
- Starring: Mel Blanc; Bernice Hansen
- Music by: Carl W. Stalling
- Animation by: Robert Cannon; Vive Risto
- Color process: Black-and-white
- Production company: Leon Schlesinger Productions
- Distributed by: Warner Bros. Pictures
- Release date: July 15, 1939
- Running time: 7 min
- Country: United States
- Language: English

Porky's Picnic is a 1939 American animated comedy short film directed by Robert Clampett. The short was released on July 15, 1939. It is part of the Looney Tunes series, the 61st cartoon to feature Porky Pig and the fourth cartoon to star Petunia Pig, who returns after a long absence caused by creator Frank Tashlin's departure and receiving a redesign.

== Plot ==
Porky bikes to Petunia's house for a picnic date, which she graciously accepts. They are followed by baby Pinky, who is aware of the situation and sets off on his own, but is saved by Porky after his tricycle trips. When Porky tells Pinky the story of "Goldilocks and the Three Bears", Pinky pulls the nail out of side-car of Porky's bike, causing it to become separated and both pieces of vehicle go on separate paths. Pinky has fun while Petunia panics and covers her eyes. After they pass a speeding train, the vehicle re-connects and Porky just finishes his story. Pinky claims it was the best story he "never" heard.

The trio arrive at the park, where Porky takes a nap. Pinky finds a small squirrel, which he attempts to decapitate with a pair of scissors to no avail, until Petunia stops him. He then tricks Porky by hitting him on the head with a wooden plank multiple times before running off to the zoo, where he avoids being bitten by a crocodile three times, twice of which was to retrieve his shoe. Petunia is horrified and notifies Porky, who searches the zoo and finds him sleeping with a big cat and its offspring. The big cat chases Porky and Pinky, during which Porky resuscitates a fainting Petunia. As the big cat accidentally slams onto the cage, Porky manages to get Pinky to Petunia's place. Petunia kisses Porky's muddy face, causing her face to become muddy instead. Pinky tries to decapitate the squirrel again, but the squirrel retaliates by hitting him with the wooden plank.

== Home media ==
Porky's Picnic is available on disc 4 of the Porky Pig 101 DVD set.

== See also ==
- Porky Pig filmography
- Looney Tunes and Merrie Melodies filmography (1930–1939)
