= Porky's Five & Ten =

1938 film by Robert Clampett

- Title card
- Directed by: Robert Clampett
- Produced by: Leon Schlesinger
- Starring: Mel Blanc
- Music by: Carl W. Stalling
- Animation by: Charles Jones; John Carey
- Color process: Black-and-white
- Production company: Leon Schlesinger Productions
- Distributed by: Warner Bros. Productions; The Vitaphone Corporation
- Release date: April 16, 1938
- Running time: 7 min
- Country: United States
- Language: English

Porky's Five & Ten is a 1938 American animated comedy short film directed by Robert Clampett. The short was released on April 16, 1938. It is the 100th film in the Looney Tunes series and the 38th cartoon to feature Porky Pig.

== Plot ==
Porky leaves on a sailboat to the Boola-Boola Islands. After thirteen days, a swordfish cuts a hole under his boat and steals his goods. The fish eat his prepared lunch while playing "The Merry-Go-Round Broke Down" on his record player. Porky is assaulted by a fish who is made to stand guard with the swordfish's tooth.

The fish eat a clock and radio, and are immediately confused by both items' functions. The radio-eating fish is shaken multiple times by the literal reenacting of the broadcast words until he vomits the radio, after which numerous items fall to form a hotel. Its first patrons are fish caricatures of Stan Laurel and Oliver Hardy, Greta Garbo and Mae West. Other fish inside watch two fish fight on Porky's typewriter, which humorously describe the fight in an accurate manner via the fish stepping on the keys.

Porky tries to catch the guard fish, who uses a fishing rod of its own to catch the worm and eats it without risking capture. The Mae West and clock fish dance. The guard fish tricks Porky into being slammed to the air by a whale. Suddenly, a waterspout appears and scares the fish away, causing every stolen item to be spun into the air and returned to Porky, who continues his trip but temporarily returns to spray the guard fish with water.

== Home media ==
Porky's Five & Ten is available on disc 2 of the Porky Pig 101 DVD set.

== See also ==
- Porky Pig filmography
- Looney Tunes and Merrie Melodies filmography (1930–1939)
