= Porky's Poppa =

1937 film by Robert Clampett

- Title card
- Directed by: Robert Clampett
- Produced by: Leon Schlesinger
- Starring: Mel Blanc
- Music by: Carl W. Stalling
- Animation by: Charles Jones
- Color process: Black-and-white
- Production company: Leon Schlesinger Productions
- Distributed by: Warner Bros. Productions; The Vitaphone Corporation
- Release date: January 15, 1938
- Running time: 7 minutes
- Country: United States
- Language: English

Porky's Poppa is a 1938 American animated comedy short film directed by Robert Clampett. The short was released on January 15, 1938. It is the 96th film in the Looney Tunes series and the 34th cartoon to feature Porky Pig.

== Summary ==
The film opens with a humorous variation of "Old MacDonald Had a Farm" on Phineas Pig's farm, showing off Porky and the animals on the farm, including a goose, a cow named Bessie and a black duck who resembles but is otherwise distinct from Daffy Duck. Porky eventually slams the record player on the ground when it introduces the Cattle, which Phineas Pig worries about.

Porky's father orders an ACME mechanical Cattleto produce Milk, as Bessie would rather chew her foot than produce milk and will be sent to a food processing facility. The mechanical cow proves to be highly efficient in producing milk, while Porky, worried for Bessie, force feeds a large pile of hay into Bessie's stomach, causing her to produce some milk, including chocolate malted milk to her embarrassment.

The mechanical cow is able to produce cheese and Ice cream, which Bessie tries to keep up to. The mechanical cow sabotages Bessie's efforts with vanishing cream, causing the milk produced and hay to disappear, then eats all of the other hay before chasing Porky and Bessie outside. It then eats more hay until milk weed is left. Bessie crashes onto the nearly full mechanical cow, causing it to explode and produce a gargantuan supply of milk. Phineas declares the mechanical cow to be superior, only for Bessie to emerge from within.

== Home media ==
- DVD – Looney Tunes Golden Collection: Volume 5
- DVD – Porky Pig 101

== See also ==
- Porky Pig filmography
- Looney Tunes and Merrie Melodies filmography (1930–1939)
