= Bob Clampett =

American animator (1913–1984)

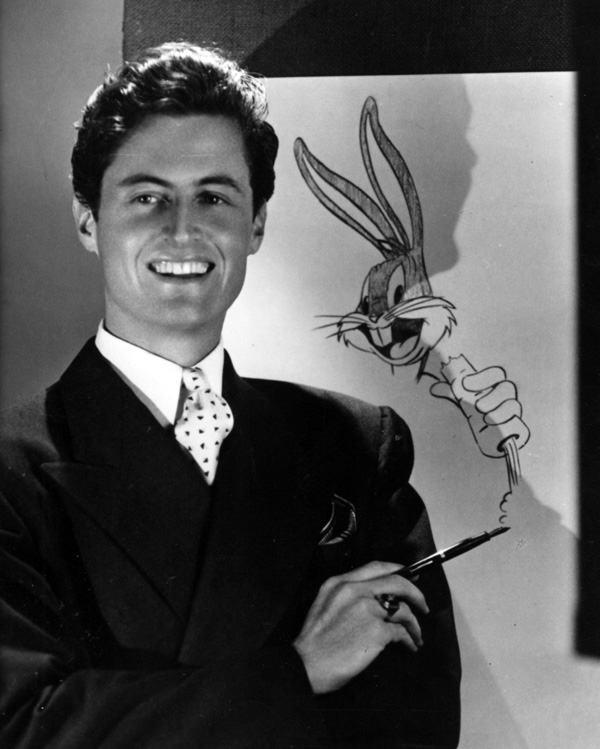
- Clampett drawing Bugs Bunny in the early 1940s
- Born: Robert Emerson Clampett; May 8, 1913; San Diego, California, U.S.
- Died: May 2, 1984 (aged 70); Detroit, Michigan, U.S.
- Resting place: Forest Lawn – Hollywood Hills Cemetery
- Education: Otis College of Art and Design
- Occupations: Animator; director; producer; puppeteer
- Years active: 1931–1984
- Employers: Harman-Ising (1931–1933); Warner Bros. Cartoons (1933–1946); Screen Gems (1946); Republic Pictures (1947); Bob Clampett Productions (1947-1962); Paramount Television Network (1949-1955)
- Spouse: Theota "Sody" Stone (m. 1955)
- Children: 3

Robert Emerson Clampett Sr. (May 8, 1913 – May 2, 1984) was an American animator, director, producer and puppeteer best known for his work on the Looney Tunes and Merrie Melodies animated series from Warner Bros. Cartoons as well as the television shows Time for Beany and Beany and Cecil.

He was born and raised not far from Hollywood and, early in life, showed an interest in animation and puppetry. After dropping out of high school in 1931, he joined the team at Harman-Ising Productions and began working on the studio's newest short subjects, Looney Tunes and Merrie Melodies. Clampett was promoted to a directorial position in 1937. During his 15 years at the studio, he directed 84 cartoons later deemed classic, and designed some of the studio's most famous characters, including Porky Pig, Daffy Duck, and Tweety. Among his most acclaimed films are Porky in Wackyland (1938) and The Great Piggy Bank Robbery (1946). He left Warner Bros. Cartoons in 1946 and turned his attention to television, creating the puppet show Time for Beany in 1949. A later animated version of the series, Beany and Cecil, was initially broadcast on ABC in 1962 and rerun until 1967. It is considered the first fully creator-driven television series and carried the byline "a Bob Clampett Cartoon".

In his later years, Clampett toured college campuses and animation festivals as a lecturer on the history of animation. His Warner cartoons have seen renewed praise in decades since for their surrealistic qualities, energetic and outrageous animation, and irreverent, wordplay-laden humor. Animation historian Jerry Beck lauded Clampett for "putting the word 'looney' in Looney Tunes."

== Early life ==
Robert Emerson Clampett Sr. was born on May 8, 1913 in San Diego, California to Robert Caleb Clampett and Mildred Joan Merrifield. His father was born in Nenagh, County Tipperary, Ireland in 1882, and immigrated to the United States with his parents at age two in 1884.

Clampett showed art skills by the age of five. From the beginning, he was intrigued with and influenced by Douglas Fairbanks, Lon Chaney, Charlie Chaplin, Buster Keaton, Harold Lloyd, Laurel & Hardy and The Marx Brothers and began making film short-subjects in his garage when he was 12. Living in Hollywood as a young boy, he and his mother Joan lived next door to Charlie Chaplin and his brother Sydney Chaplin. Clampett also recalled watching his father play handball at the Los Angeles Athletic Club with another of the great silent comedians, Harold Lloyd. He also loved to read comics from Milt Gross, Bill Holman and George Lichty, the latter of which influenced his animation style in the 1940s.

From his teens on, Clampett showed an interest in animation. He was also influenced by Salvador Dalí, Winsor McCay, Otto Messmer, Pat Sullivan, Max Fleischer, Walt Disney and Tex Avery. He had made hand puppets as a child and, before adolescence, completed what animation historian Milt Gray describes as "a sort of prototype, a kind of nondescript dinosaur sock puppet that later evolved into Cecil." In high school, Clampett drew a full-page comic about the nocturnal adventures of a cat, later published in color in a Sunday edition of the Los Angeles Times. King Features took note and offered Clampett a "cartoonist's contract" beginning at $75 a week after high school. King Features allowed him to work in their Los Angeles art department on Saturdays and vacations during high school. King Features occasionally printed his cartoons for encouragement, and paid his way through Otis Art Institute, where he learned to paint in oils and to sculpt.

Clampett attended Glendale High School and Hoover High School in Glendale, California, but left Hoover a few months short of graduating in 1931. He found a job at a doll factory owned by his aunt, Charlotte Clark. Clark was looking for an appealing item to sell, and Clampett suggested Mickey Mouse, whose popularity was growing. Unable to find a drawing of the character anywhere, Clampett took his sketchpad to the movie theater and came out with several sketches. Clark was concerned with copyright, so they drove to the Disney studio. Walt and Roy Disney were delighted, and they set up a business not far from the Disney studio. Clampett recalled his short time working for Disney: "Walt Disney himself sometimes came over in an old car to pick up the dolls; he would give them out to visitors to the studio and at sales meetings. I helped him load the dolls in the car. One time, his car, loaded with Mickey's, wouldn't start, and I pushed while Walt steered, until it caught, and he took off."

== Career ==
=== Looney Tunes (1931–1946) ===
==== As an animator ====
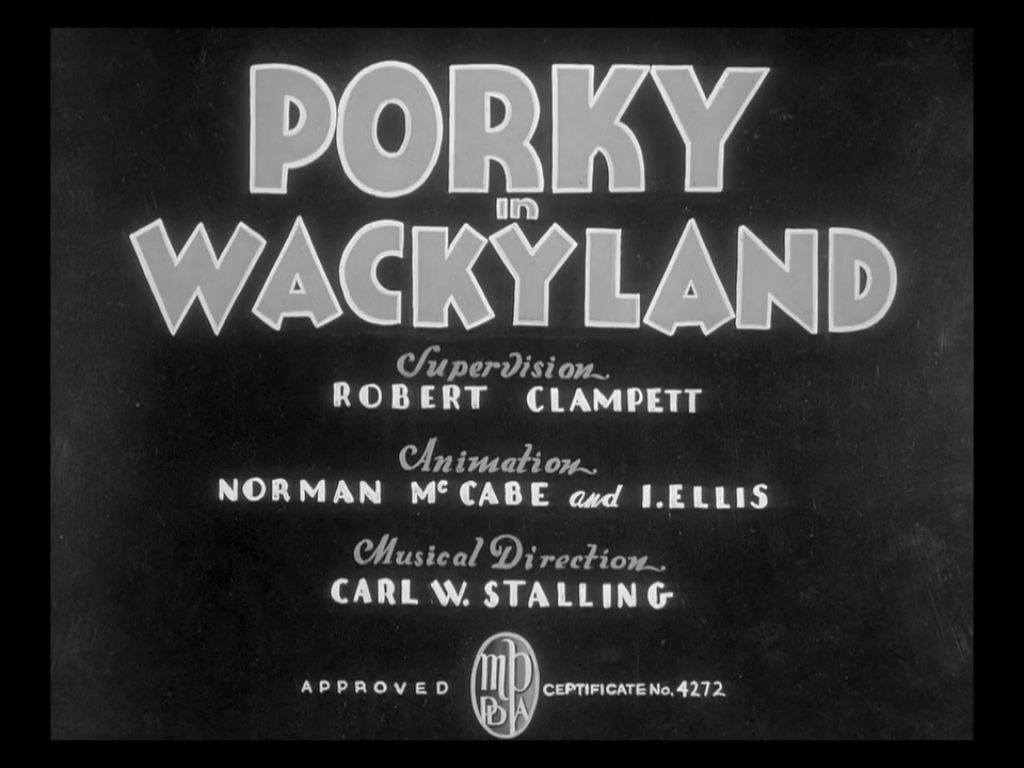
Porky in Wackyland was inducted into the National Film Registry of the Library of Congress in 2000, deemed "culturally, historically, or aesthetically significant."

Clampett was, in his words, so "enchanted" by the new medium of sound cartoons that he tried to join Disney as an animator. While Disney wanted to hire Clampett, they ultimately turned him down due to them having had enough animators at that time, so Clampett instead interviewed with Harman-Ising Pictures, producers of Warner Bros.' Looney Tunes and Merrie Melodies cartoons for executive producer Leon Schlesinger. Schlesinger viewed one of Clampett's 16mm films and was impressed, offering him an assistant animator position at the studio; Clampett was only 17 years old at the time of his hiring.

Clampett's first assignment at Harman-Ising was animating secondary characters in the first Merrie Melodies cartoon, Lady, Play Your Mandolin! (1931). The same year, Clampett began attending story meetings after submitting an idea eventually used for Smile, Darn Ya, Smile!. The two series were produced at Harman-Ising until mid-1933, when Harman and Ising broke ties with Schlesinger and signed with Metro-Goldwyn-Mayer. Clampett served as an assistant to animator Larry Martin, who was the basis for Dishonest John in Beany and Cecil.

Schlesinger immediately started his own studio, Leon Schlesinger Productions, headquartered in rented offices on Warner Bros.' older Sunset Boulevard studio lot (Warners' main operations were now situated at the recently acquired First National Pictures studio facility in Burbank). Clampett left Harman and Ising and joined the new studio. In his early years at the studio, Clampett primarily worked for Friz Freleng, under whose guidance Clampett grew into an able animator.

By 1934, Schlesinger was in crisis, seeking a well-known cartoon character. He noted that Hal Roach's Our Gang short film series consisted entirely of "little kids doing things together," and a studio-wide drive to get ideas for an animal version of Our Gang commenced. Clampett submitted a drawing of a pig (Porky) and a black cat (Beans), and, in an imitation of the lettering on a can of Campbell's Pork and Beans, wrote "Clampett's Porky and Beans." Porky debuted in the Friz Freleng-directed I Haven't Got a Hat in 1935. Around the same time, Schlesinger announced a studio-wide contest, offering a monetary prize to the staff member who turned in the best original story. Clampett's story won first prize and was made into My Green Fedora, also directed by Freleng.

Clampett was encouraged by these successes and began writing more story contributions. After Schlesinger realized he needed another unit, he made a deal with Tex Avery, naming Clampett his collaborator. They were moved to a ramshackle building used by gardeners and WB custodial staff for storage of cleaning supplies, solvents, brooms, lawnmowers and other implements. Working apart from the other animators in a small, dilapidated wooden bungalow in the middle of the Sunset Boulevard lot, Avery and Clampett soon discovered they were not the only inhabitants - they shared the building with thousands of tiny termites. They christened the building "Termite Terrace", a name eventually used by historians to describe the entire studio. The two soon developed an irreverent animation style that would set Warner Bros. apart from its competitors. They were soon joined by animators Chuck Jones, Virgil Ross, and Sid Sutherland, and worked virtually without interference on their new, groundbreaking style of humor for the next year. It was a wild place with an almost college fraternity-like atmosphere. Animators would frequently pull pranks such as gluing paper streamers to the wings of flies. Leon Schlesinger, who rarely ventured there, was reputed on one visit to have remarked in his lisping voice, "Pew, let me out of here! The only thing missing is the sound of a flushing toilet!!" During production of Porky's Duck Hunt in 1937, Avery created a character that would become Daffy Duck, and Clampett animated the character for the first time.

==== As a director ====
On the side in 1936, Clampett directed test animation for a sales presentation of a potential series of animated shorts based on Edgar Rice Burroughs' John Carter of Mars, with Burroughs himself involved and planning to sell the series to MGM. Schlesinger colleagues Chuck Jones and Robert Cannon collaborated with Clampett on the animation work. Clampett filmed Cannon in live-action as John Carter and rotoscoped it into the film. Clampett planned to leave Leon Schlesinger Productions, but Schlesinger offered him a promotion to director and a higher salary if he would stay. Clampett was promoted to director in late 1936 and directed a color sequence in the feature When's Your Birthday? (1937).

In early 1937, Clampett was led to what became a co-directing stint with fellow animator Chuck Jones for the financially ailing Ub Iwerks, whom Schlesinger subcontracted to produce several Porky Pig shorts. Clampett, Jones, and Cannon were sent to Animated Pictures to work with his staff on these shorts, which featured the short-lived and generally unpopular Gabby Goat as Porky's sidekick. While Iwerks directed the first two shorts under this deal, he walked out on the project while preparing the third, Porky's Badtime Story. Ray Katz, Schlesinger's production manager and brother-in-law, assigned Clampett to take over as director, for which Clampett received his first Looney Tunes directorial credit. Clampett shared directorial duties with Jones, who drew the character layout drawings while Clampett supervised all other aspects of production.

The Iwerks deal was soon terminated and Clampett, Jones, and Cannon were returned to the Warner Sunset lot, where Clampett was given his own unit as director – albeit working in a separate Sunset lot building from the other Schlesinger staffers under a subcontractor deal Schlesinger set up with Ray Katz. Starting with Rover's Rival (also 1937), Clampett would continue as director of black-and-white Porky Pig cartoons - and two 1941 Technicolor Merrie Melodies shorts - under Katz through the end of 1941; Jones worked on and off as Clampett's uncredited co-director until Jones was given his own director's unit in the main Schlesinger building in 1938.

It was during this period that Clampett directed one of his best-known films, Porky in Wackyland (1938), in which Porky Pig enters a surreal land deep in Africa to hunt a wacky, reality-bending dodo bird. Under the Warner system, Clampett had complete creative control over his own films, within severe money and time limitations (he was only given $3,000 and four weeks to complete each short).

Booby Traps, Private Snafu short directed by Bob Clampett in 1944

Clampett was so popular in theaters that Schlesinger told the other directors to imitate him, emphasizing gags and action. When Tex Avery departed in 1941, his unit was taken over by Clampett while Norman McCabe took over Clampett's old unit. Clampett finished Avery's remaining unfinished cartoons. When McCabe joined the armed forces, Frank Tashlin rejoined Schlesinger as director, and the unit was eventually turned over to Robert McKimson. Milton Gray notes that from The Hep Cat (1942) on, the cartoons become even more wild as Clampett's experimentation reached a peak.

During World War II, Clampett directed several propaganda shorts, including the Private Snafu series, but also one-shorts like Any Bonds Today? (1942), Russian Rhapsody (1944) and Draftee Daffy (1945).

Clampett later created the character of Tweety, introduced in A Tale of Two Kitties in 1942. His cartoons grew increasingly violent, irreverent, and surreal, not beholden to even the faintest hint of real-world physics, and his characters have been argued to be easily the most rubbery and wacky of all the Warner directors'. Clampett was heavily influenced by the Spanish surrealist artist Salvador Dalí, as is most visible in Porky in Wackyland (1938), wherein the entire short takes place within a Dalí-esque landscape complete with melting objects and abstracted forms. Clampett and his work can even be considered part of the surrealist movement, as it incorporated film as well as static media. It was largely Clampett's influence that would impel the Warner directors to shed the final vestiges of all Disney influence. Clampett was also known for creating some brief voices or sound effects in some of the cartoons. One of these became a personal trademark: a vocal sound accompanying the iris-out closing of every Clampett cartoon ("Bay-woop!"). Clampett liked to bring contemporary cultural movements into his cartoons, especially jazz; film, magazines, comics, novels, and popular music are referenced in Clampett shorts, most visible in Book Revue (1946), where performers are drawn onto various celebrated books.

Clampett was a good source for censorship stories, though the accuracy of his recollections has been disputed. According to an interview published in Funnyworld #12 (1971), Clampett had a method for ensuring that certain elements of his films would escape the censors' cuts. He added extremely suggestive or objectionable gags intended solely at the censors; they would focus on cutting those and thus leave in the ones he actually wanted.

A Tale of Two Kitties, short film directed by Clampett, released in 1942

Clampett left the studio in May 1945, leaving a handful of shorts unfinished before they were picked up again by other studio directors. The generally accepted story was that Clampett left over matters of artistic freedom, despite some people claiming that he left the studio on his own. Clampett's style was becoming increasingly divergent from those of Freleng and Jones. In any event, Clampett left after Leon Schlesinger was succeeded by Edward Selzer, who was far less tolerant of him than Schlesinger had been. The Warner style that he was instrumental in developing was leaving him behind. Warner Bros. had recently acquired the rights to the entire Looney Tunes and Merrie Melodies studio from Schlesinger, and while his cartoons of 1946 are today considered on the cutting edge of the art of the period, at the time, Clampett was ready to seek new challenges. He left at what some considered the peak of his creativity and against everyone's advice. Clampett's position as director after his departure was given to Arthur Davis, who would direct cartoons with his unit until it was dissolved in late 1947 over budgetary issues.

=== Later career and Beany and Cecil (1946–1984) ===
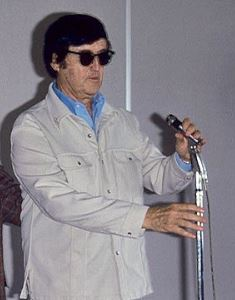
Clampett speaking at the 1976 San Diego Comic Convention

Around the time Clampett left Warner Bros. Cartoons, Henry Binder and Ray Katz, the studios assistant producers and his key executives, went to Screen Gems, the cartoon division of Columbia Pictures, and asked Clampett to join them as the studio's creative head. He ultimately worked as a screenwriter and gag writer for the studio. Later in 1946, Republic Pictures incorporated animation (by Walter Lantz Productions) into its Gene Autry feature film Sioux City Sue. It turned out well enough for Republic to dabble in animated cartoons. Clampett, who had now left Screen Gems to form his own studio, directed a single cartoon for Republic, It's a Grand Old Nag, featuring the equine character Charlie Horse and produced at Bob Clampett Productions. Republic management, however, reconsidered due to declining profits and discontinued the series. Clampett took his direction credit under the name "Kilroy".

In 1949, Clampett turned his attention to television, where he created the famous puppet show Time for Beany. The show, featuring the talents of voice artists Stan Freberg and Daws Butler, would earn Clampett three Emmys. Groucho Marx and Albert Einstein were both fans of the series. In 1952, he created the Thunderbolt the Wondercolt television series and the 3D prologue to Bwana Devil featuring Beany and Cecil. In 1954, he directed Willy the Wolf (the first puppet variety show on television), created and voiced the lead in the Buffalo Billy television show. In the late 1950s, Clampett was hired by Associated Artists Productions to catalog the pre-August 1948 Warner cartoons it had just acquired. He also created an animated version of the puppet show called Beany and Cecil, whose 26 half-hour episodes were first broadcast on ABC in 1962 and were rerun on the network for five years.

Clampett's studio was at 729 Seward Street in Hollywood, later a Klasky Csupo studio.

In his later years, Bob Clampett toured college campuses and animation festivals as a lecturer on the history of animation. In 1974, he was awarded an Inkpot Award at the San Diego Comic Convention. In 1975, he was the focus of a documentary entitled Bugs Bunny: Superstar, the first documentary to examine the history of the Warner Bros. cartoons. Clampett, whose collection of drawings, films, and memorabilia from the golden days of Termite Terrace was legendary, provided nearly all of the behind-the-scenes drawings and home-movie footage for the film; furthermore, his wife, Sody Clampett, is credited as the film's production coordinator. In an audio commentary recorded for Bugs Bunny: Superstar, director Larry Jackson claimed that in order to secure Clampett's participation and access to Clampett's collection of Warner Bros. history, he had to sign a contract that stipulated Clampett would host the documentary and also have approval over the final cut. Jackson also claimed that Clampett was very reluctant to speak about the other directors and their contributions.

== Claims made during interviews ==
Though Clampett's contribution to the Warner Bros. animation legacy was considerable and inarguable, he has been criticized by his peers as "a shameless self-promoter who provoked the wrath of his former Warner Bros. colleagues in later years for allegedly claiming credit for ideas that were not his." Some of this animosity appears to have come from Clampett's perceived "golden boy" status at the studio (Clampett's mother was said to be a close friend of cartoon producer Leon Schlesinger), which allowed him to ignore studio rules that everyone else was expected to follow. In addition, Mel Blanc, the voice actor who worked with Clampett at the same studio for ten years, also accused Clampett of being an "egotist who took credit for everything."

Beginning with a magazine article in 1946, shortly after he left the studio, Clampett repeatedly referred to himself as "the creator" of Bugs Bunny, often adding the side-note that he used Clark Gable's carrot-eating scene in It Happened One Night as inspiration for his "creation". (Clampett can be observed making this claim in Bugs Bunny: Superstar.) The other two directorial fathers Bugs is claimed to have had are Tex Avery, who directed A Wild Hare, his first official short; and Robert McKimson, who drew the definitive Bugs Bunny model sheet. However some argue that, based on a viewing of the early Bugs cartoons of the late 1930s and early 1940s, the character was not "created" by one director, but evolved in personality, voice, and design over several years through the collective efforts of Clampett, Avery, Chuck Jones, Friz Freleng, McKimson, Mel Blanc, Cal Dalton, Ben Hardaway and Robert Givens. In Bugs Bunny: Superstar, Clampett also takes credit for several model sheets drawn by other artists, such as one from the first Porky Pig cartoon, I Haven't Got a Hat (1935), even though it was actually made by Freleng.

== Rivalry with Chuck Jones ==
Chuck Jones, despite initially working alongside Clampett in their formative years, would become his most outspoken detractor by the 1970s. Animation historian Milton Gray details the long and bitter rivalry between Clampett and Jones in his essay "Bob Clampett Remembered". Gray, a personal friend of Clampett, calls the controversy "a deliberate and vicious smear campaign by one of Bob's rivals in the cartoon business". He reveals that Jones was angry at Clampett for making numerous generalizations in his 1970 interview with Funnyworld that gave Clampett too much credit, including taking sole credit for not only Bugs and Daffy but also Jones's character Sniffles and Freleng's Yosemite Sam. He writes that Jones began making additional accusations against Clampett, such as that Clampett would "go around the studio at night, looking at other directors' storyboards for ideas he could steal for his own cartoons."

Jones sent a letter to Tex Avery in 1975 (a week before release of Bugs Bunny: Superstar) that jotted down numerous alleged false claims made by Clampett from a 1970 interview with Michael Barrier, and according to Gray, distributed copies to every fan he met—seemingly the genesis of the growing controversy. Gray asserts that Clampett was a "kind, generous man [who was] deeply hurt and saddened by Jones's accusations. [...] I feel that Bob Clampett deserves tremendous respect and gratitude for the wonderful work that he left us." Jones would later not include Clampett as one of Bugs' "fathers" in his 1979 compilation film The Bugs Bunny/Road Runner Movie, which was made to refute claims made in the documentary, though he did briefly mention working with Clampett in his 1989 autobiography Chuck Amuck: The Life and Times of An Animated Cartoonist and his 1998 interview for the American Television Archive.

== Death ==
Clampett died of a heart attack on May 2, 1984, in Detroit, Michigan, six days before his 71st birthday, while touring the country to promote the home video release of Beany & Cecil cartoons. He is buried in Forest Lawn Hollywood Hills.

== Legacy ==
Since 1984, The Bob Clampett Humanitarian Award has been given each year at the Eisner Awards. Recipients of the award include June Foray, Jack Kirby, Sergio Aragonés, Patrick McDonnell, Maggie Thompson, Ray Bradbury and Mark Evanier.

Clampett's Tin Pan Alley Cats (1943) was chosen by the Library of Congress as a "prime example of the music and mores of our times" and a print was buried in a time capsule in Washington, D.C., so future generations might see it. Porky in Wackyland (1938) was inducted into the National Film Registry of the Library of Congress in 2000, deemed "culturally, historically, or aesthetically significant."

Animator John Kricfalusi, best known for being the creator of Nickelodeon's The Ren & Stimpy Show, got to know Clampett in his later years and has reflected on those times as inspirational. Kricfalusi cited Clampett as his favorite animator and Clampett's The Great Piggy Bank Robbery (1946) as his favorite cartoon: "I saw this thing and it completely changed my life, I thought it was the greatest thing I'd ever seen, and I still think it is."

Animation historian Leonard Maltin has called Clampett's cartoons "unmistakable". Milton Gray believes that Schlesinger put Clampett in charge of the black and white cartoon division in order to save it, and many historians have singled out a scene in Porky's Duck Hunt, in which Daffy exits, as a defining Clampett moment. Maltin called it "a level of wackiness few moviegoers had ever seen".

Historian Charles Solomon noted a rubbery, flexible animation quality visible in all Clampett's shorts, and Maltin noted an "energetic, comic anarchy". While Clampett's cartoons were not as well known in the latter half of the 20th century because television syndicators only had the rights to the post-1948 Warner cartoons, his creations have increased in notoriety and acclaim in recent decades.

Martha Sigall recalled Clampett as "an enthusiastic and fun type of guy". She describes him as consistently nice to her and very generous when it came to gifts or donations to a cause. She had left the Termite Terrace in 1943 and did not meet Clampett again until 1960. She did, however, hear from people whom Clampett helped break into the animation business and/or mentored.

Clampett is survived by his three children, who preserve his work. They are Robert Clampett Jr., who worked for his father as a puppeteer at Bob Clampett Productions; Ruth Clampett, an author of several books, including a book about an animated couple (she also founded Clampett Studio collections after her father's death); and Cheri Clampett, a therapeutic yoga specialist.

The Clampett family auctioned off Bob Clampett's extensive collection of memorabilia in March 2025.

== Filmography ==
=== Warner Bros. ===
- When's Your Birthday? (1937) (animated sequence directed by Clampett and photographed in Technicolor)
- Bugs Bunny (1942) (propaganda film)

==== Looney Tunes/Merrie Melodies (LT/MM) shorts ====
- Porky and Gabby (1937) (supervised by Ub Iwerks, assisted by Clampett and Chuck Jones)
- Porky's Super Service (1937) (supervised by Ub Iwerks, assisted by Clampett and Jones)
- Porky's Badtime Story (1937) (first Looney Tunes short supervised by Clampett and assistant Chuck Jones, first supervisory credit)
- Get Rich Quick Porky (1937) (co-directed with Chuck Jones)
- Rover's Rival (1937) (co-directed with Chuck Jones)
- Porky's Hero Agency (1937) (co-directed with Chuck Jones)
- Porky's Poppa (1938) (co-directed with Chuck Jones)
- What Price Porky (1938)
- Porky's Five and Ten (1938)
- Injun Trouble (1938)
- Porky's Party (1938)
- Porky & Daffy (1938)
- Porky in Wackyland (1938)
- Porky's Naughty Nephew (1938)
- Porky in Egypt (1938)
- The Daffy Doc (1938)
- The Lone Stranger and Porky (1939)
- Porky's Tire Trouble (1939)
- Porky's Movie Mystery (1939)
- Chicken Jitters (1939)
- Kristopher Kolumbus, Jr. (1939)
- Polar Pals (1939)
- Scalp Trouble (1939)
- Porky's Picnic (1939)
- Wise Quacks (1939)
- Porky's Hotel (1939)
- Jeepers Creepers (1939)
- Naughty Neighbors (1939)
- Pied Piper Porky (1939)
- The Film Fan (1939)
- Porky's Last Stand (1940)
- Africa Squeaks (1940)
- Ali-Baba Bound (1940)
- Pilgrim Porky (1940)
- Slap Happy Pappy (1940)
- Porky's Poor Fish (1940)
- The Chewin' Bruin (1940)
- Patient Porky (1940)
- Prehistoric Porky (1940)
- The Sour Puss (1940)
- The Timid Toreador (1940) (co-directed with Norman McCabe)
- Porky's Snooze Reel (1941) (co-directed with Norman McCabe)
- Goofy Groceries (1941) (first Merrie Melodies short directed by Clampett)
- Farm Frolics (1941)
- A Coy Decoy (1941)
- Meet John Doughboy (1941)
- We, the Animals Squeak! (1941)
- The Henpecked Duck (1941)
- The Cagey Canary (1941)
- Wabbit Twouble (1941)
- Porky's Pooch (1941)
- Aloha Hooey (1942)
- Crazy Cruise (1942)
- Horton Hatches the Egg (1942)
- The Wacky Wabbit (1942)
- Nutty News (1942)
- Bugs Bunny Gets the Boid (1942)
- Wacky Blackout (1942)
- Eatin' on the Cuff or The Moth Who Came to Dinner (1942)
- The Hep Cat (1942)
- A Tale of Two Kitties (1942)
- Coal Black and de Sebben Dwarfs (1943)
- Tortoise Wins by a Hare (1943)
- The Wise Quacking Duck (1943)
- Tin Pan Alley Cats (1943)
- A Corny Concerto (1943)
- Fighting Tools (1943)
- Falling Hare (1943)
- An Itch in Time (1943)
- What's Cookin' Doc? (1944)
- Booby Traps (1944)
- Tick Tock Tuckered (1944)
- Russian Rhapsody (1944)
- Hare Ribbin' (1944)
- Birdy and the Beast (1944)
- Buckaroo Bugs (1944)
- The Old Grey Hare (1944)
- Draftee Daffy (1945)
- Tokyo Woes (1945)
- A Gruesome Twosome (1945)
- Wagon Heels (1945)
- The Bashful Buzzard (1945)
- Book Revue (1946)
- Baby Bottleneck (1946)
- Kitty Kornered (1946)
- The Great Piggy Bank Robbery (1946)
- The Big Snooze (1946)

=== Republic Pictures ===
- It's a Grand Old Nag (1947) (credited as Kilroy)

=== Bob Clampett Productions ===
- St. George and the Dragon (TV pilot)
- Time for Beany (Puppet TV Show) (1949-1955)
  - The Willy the Wolf Show
  - Thunderbolt the Wonder Colt
  - FLyboy
- Twig (TV pilot) (1957)
- Beeper and Guided Muscle (TV pilot) (1959)
- The Edgar Bergen Show (TV pilot) (1961)
- Tex and Judy (TV plot) (1962)
- Beany and Cecil (1962) (TV series)

== Sources ==
- Barrier, Michael (November 6, 2003). Hollywood Cartoons: American Animation in Its Golden Age. Oxford University Press. ISBN 978-0-19-983922-3.
