= Porky's Cafe =

1942 film by Charles M. Jones

- Title card
- Directed by: Charles M. Jones
- Story by: Rich Hogan (uncredited)
- Produced by: Leon Schlesinger
- Starring: Mel Blanc
- Music by: Carl W. Stalling
- Animation by: Rudolph Larriva
- Color process: Black and white
- Production company: Leon Schlesinger Productions
- Distributed by: Warner Bros. Pictures
- Release date: February 21, 1942
- Running time: 6 min
- Country: United States
- Language: English

Porky's Cafe is a 1942 American animated comedy short film directed by Charles M. Jones. The short was released on February 21, 1942. It is part of the Looney Tunes series, the 98th cartoon to feature Porky Pig and the final black-and-white cartoon to be directed by Jones.

== Plot ==
Porky Pig operates a cafe where Conrad Cat is hired as a chef. He flips pancakes and accidentally drops pancakes on his head without realizing. He spends the rest of the film attempting to make a pancake with an African pygmy ant (the same one from Porky's Ant and Porky's Midnight Matinee) in the batter.

Porky makes alphabet soup for a customer by literally typing out the letter pasta from a typewriter; the customer struggles to drink it due to the steam coming to life and being a hindrance. He then orders a large sandwich, which he eats quickly but causes it to block his esophagus. The customer then orders a T-bone steak meal and coffee; the T-bone steak is botched when it is pan fried. Conrad runs into Porky while holding a wedding cake, who then runs into the customer's meal, with only the ant remaining unscathed and happy on top of the wedding cake.

== Home media ==
This short is available on disc 5 of the Porky Pig 101 DVD set.

== See also ==
- Porky Pig filmography
- Looney Tunes and Merrie Melodies filmography (1940–1949)
- List of animated films in the public domain in the United States
