= Porky's Pastry Pirates =

1942 film by Isadore Freleng

- Title card
- Directed by: I. Freleng
- Story by: Dave Monahan
- Produced by: Leon Schlesinger
- Starring: Mel Blanc
- Music by: Carl W. Stalling
- Animation by: Gerald Chiniquy
- Color process: Black and white
- Production company: Leon Schlesinger Productions
- Distributed by: Warner Bros. Pictures
- Release date: January 17, 1942
- Running time: 6 min
- Country: United States
- Language: English

Porky's Pastry Pirates is a 1942 American animated comedy short film directed by Isadore Freleng. The short was released on January 17, 1942. It is part of the Looney Tunes series and the 96th cartoon to feature Porky Pig.

== Plot ==
A muscular bee attempts to convince a meek fly to find food in Porky's Sanitary Bakery, in which Porky Pig attempts to swat flies. He successfully scares Porky away and samples various desserts while taunting Porky. The bee somehow shocks Porky with his sting while Porky holds his fly swatter. The fly then enters to eat a cake, but is driven out before he gets to have a bite. The fly beats up the bee instead when the bee exploits the bakery's closure for a safe meal.

== Home media ==
This short is available on disc 5 of the Porky Pig 101 DVD set.

== See also ==
- Porky Pig filmography
- Looney Tunes and Merrie Melodies filmography (1940–1949)
- List of animated films in the public domain in the United States
