= Porky in the North Woods =

1936 film by Frank Tash

- Title card
- Directed by: Frank Tash
- Produced by: Leon Schlesinger
- Music by: Carl W. Stalling
- Animation by: Volney White; Norman McCabe
- Color process: Black-and-white
- Production company: Leon Schlesinger Productions
- Distributed by: Warner Bros. Productions; The Vitaphone Corporation
- Release date: December 19, 1936 (USA)
- Running time: 7 min
- Country: United States
- Language: English

Porky in the North Woods is a 1936 American animated comedy short film directed by Frank Tash. The short was released on December 19, 1936. It is the 79th film in the Looney Tunes series and the seventeenth cartoon to feature Porky Pig. It is also the first film in the series to credit Norman McCabe, who would become one of the series' directors.

== Plot ==
Porky operates a game refuge in Canada, where he forbids trespassing, shooting, trapping, fishing and fires, pleasing a wide range of wild animals. Elsewhere, an individual mocks Porky's kindness and ruthlessly disregards every rule.

The individual places a bear trap with a fruit, which two beavers fight over until one gets trapped. He beckons the other beaver to get help from Porky, which he obliges, but not before he eats the trap's fruit. As Porky recovers the beaver's mangled tail, he also saves a rabbit who has its ears trapped, a burnt weasel as well as a skunk whose tail is trapped.

As the individual finds his traps empty, Porky heals the animals at a first aid station by ironing their trapped parts. The individual sneaks in, with Porky ironing his hands before realizing; the individual manages to catch him and iron his tail, pinning it on the table so he can be punched. He whips Porky into the wall and hits him with a racquet repeatedly, incapacitating him.

The healed beaver realizes the situation and rushes to a moose, whose call summons the entire force of animals in the refuge, including bears, reindeer and skunks amongst others. Led by the two beavers, they kick the individual out of the station, beating him with clubs, throwing logs into him and throw snowballs on him as he escapes on skis. He eventually trips and is stuck in the ground, asphyxiating to death while the two beavers play on him like a seesaw and trapping him underneath.

== Home media ==
Porky in the North Woods was released on the Looney Tunes Golden Collection: Volume 4 and on Porky Pig 101.

== See also ==
- Porky Pig filmography
- Looney Tunes and Merrie Melodies filmography (1930–1939)
