= Kristopher Kolumbus Jr. =

1939 film by Robert Clampett

Kristopher Kolumbus, Jr.
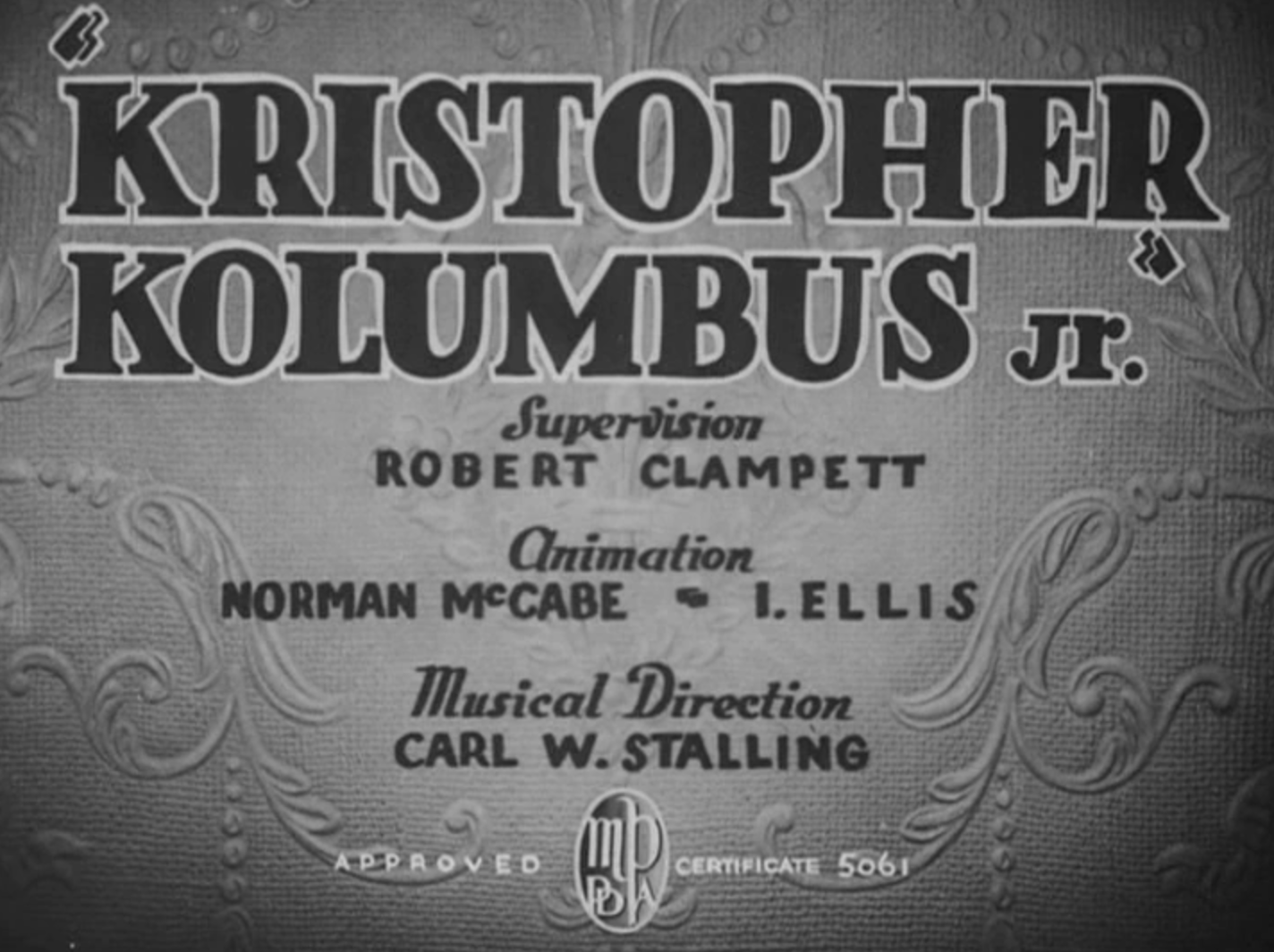
- Title card
- Directed by: Robert Clampett
- Produced by: Leon Schlesinger
- Starring: Mel Blanc
- Music by: Carl W. Stalling
- Animation by: Norman McCabe; Isadore Ellis
- Color process: Black-and-white
- Production company: Leon Schlesinger Productions
- Distributed by: Warner Bros. Pictures
- Release date: May 13, 1939
- Running time: 7 min
- Country: United States
- Language: English

Kristopher Kolumbus Jr. is a 1939 American animated comedy short film directed by Robert Clampett. The short was released on May 13, 1939. It is part of the Looney Tunes series and the 57th cartoon to feature Porky Pig.

== Plot ==
In 1492, Porky Pig, impersonating Christopher Columbus, proposes to Queen Isabella of Spain to travel the world and prove that it is not flat. When the queen doubts whether the world is round, Porky throws a baseball which travels throughout the United States (including Ohio, Los Angeles, and New York City) and China. The Queen is convinced and gives Porky her crown jewels to finance the journey. Porky's men are too scared to partake in the journey and literally turn into mice when questioned in order to escape. Porky nevertheless sets off on his own to minimal fanfare and support.

After forty days and nights, Porky comes upon a sea serpent, who nonchalantly flexes his muscles instead of hurting the horrified Porky. He then makes his way out in fear of another sea serpent under Porky's ship who is an actual threat. He arrives at Manhattan, New York City to a warm welcome and brings Native Americans to Spain, who demonstrate the jitterbug dance to the Queen. The Queen likes it and dances with Porky.

== Home media ==
Kristopher Kolumbus Jr. is available on disc 3 of the Porky Pig 101 DVD set.

== See also ==
- Porky Pig filmography
- Looney Tunes and Merrie Melodies filmography (1930–1939)
