= Porky's Double Trouble =

1937 film by Frank Tashlin

- Title card
- Directed by: Frank Tashlin
- Story by: George Manuell
- Produced by: Leon Schlesinger
- Starring: Mel Blanc
- Music by: Carl W. Stalling
- Animation by: Joe D'Igalo
- Color process: Black and white
- Production company: Leon Schlesinger Productions
- Distributed by: Warner Bros. Productions; The Vitaphone Corporation
- Release date: November 13, 1937
- Running time: 7 min
- Country: United States
- Language: English

Porky's Double Trouble is a 1937 American animated comedy short film directed by Frank Tashlin. The short was released on November 13, 1937. It is the 94th film in the Looney Tunes series, the 32nd cartoon to feature Porky Pig and the third cartoon to feature Petunia Pig.

== Plot ==
A criminal resembling Porky Pig escapes from Alacrazz Prison. His allies hide in an empty girl's school and welcome a voluptuous women who proclaims to deliver a message from him, only to reveal that it is the criminal in disguise, who is alarmed that he has been promoted from "Public Enemy Number 9" to Number 1. Spotting a report of Porky being promoted to bank teller and having his photo taken in a similar pose, the criminal exploits the opportunity to impersonate him.

The criminal dresses up as the voluptuous woman and drives to the bank, pretending to have a faulty engine while Porky generously fixes it during lunch break. He struggles to hit Porky with a hammer as he continuously interrupts, before swiftly kicking him into the car and trapping him at the girl's school. He dresses up as Porky and embezzles a multitude of jewelry and money entrusted by customers. Petunia flirts with the criminal, unable to tell him apart from Porky, but realizes after the criminal forcibly gropes her and sounds an alarm.

Porky manages to escape from the trap as incompetent police officers are alerted to the criminals' hideout. He swings with a chandelier and incapacitates criminals. Petunia helps identify Porky from the criminal, but flirts with the criminal as she walks him out into the police car.

== Home media ==
DVD:

- Looney Tunes Golden Collection: Volume 5
- Porky Pig 101

== See also ==
- Porky Pig filmography
- Looney Tunes and Merrie Melodies filmography (1930–1939)
