= Porky Pig filmography =

Porky Pig has been featured in various media since his debut in 1935.

Directors of his cartoons are listed in parentheses.

== Golden age shorts ==
=== 1935 ===
- I Haven't Got a Hat (March 2, 1935) - "Merrie Melodies" series, Porky's first appearance (Friz Freleng)
- Hollywood Capers (October 19, 1935) - "Beans" series; first black-and-white appearance (Jack King)
- Gold Diggers of '49 (November 2, 1935) - "Beans" series; Beans, instead of Porky, ends the cartoon by saying "That's all folks!" (Tex Avery)

=== 1936 ===
- Alpine Antics (January 18, 1936) - "Beans" series (Jack King)
- The Phantom Ship (February 1, 1936) - "Beans" series, cameo appearance (Jack King)
- Boom Boom (February 29, 1936) - "Beans" series (Jack King)
- The Blow Out (April 4, 1936) - First solo short (Tex Avery)
- Westward Whoa (April 25, 1936) - Last pairing with Beans the Cat (Jack King)
- Plane Dippy (April 30, 1936) (Tex Avery)
- Fish Tales (May 23, 1936) (Jack King)
- Shanghaied Shipmates (June 20, 1936) (Jack King)
- Porky's Pet (July 11, 1936) (Jack King)
- Porky the Rain-Maker (August 1, 1936) (Tex Avery)
- Porky's Poultry Plant (August 22, 1936) (Frank Tashlin)
- Porky's Moving Day (September 12, 1936) (Jack King)
- Milk and Money (October 3, 1936) (Tex Avery)
- Boulevardier from the Bronx (October 10, 1936) - "Merrie Melodies" series, cameo appearance (Friz Freleng)
- Little Beau Porky (November 14, 1936) (Frank Tashlin)
- The Village Smithy (December 5, 1936) (Tex Avery)
- Porky in the North Woods (December 19, 1936) (Frank Tashlin)

=== 1937 ===
- Porky the Wrestler (January 9, 1937) (Tex Avery)
- Porky's Road Race (February 6, 1937) (Frank Tashlin)
- Picador Porky (February 27, 1937) - This is the first short featuring Mel Blanc, who voices Porky's drunk friends. (Tex Avery)
- Porky's Romance (April 3, 1937) - The last time Joe Dougherty voiced Porky, first appearance of Petunia Pig. (Frank Tashlin)
- Porky's Duck Hunt (April 17, 1937) - This is the first short in which Porky was voiced by Mel Blanc; the first appearance of Daffy Duck; and the first cartoon of Porky with the current design. (Tex Avery)
- Porky and Gabby (May 15, 1937) - First appearance of Gabby Goat (Ub Iwerks)
- Porky's Building (June 19, 1937) (Frank Tashlin)
- Porky's Super Service (July 3, 1937) (Ub Iwerks)
- Porky's Badtime Story (July 24, 1937) - With Gabby Goat (Bob Clampett)
- Porky's Railroad (August 7, 1937) (Frank Tashlin)
- Get Rich Quick Porky (August 28, 1937) - Final appearance of Gabby Goat (Bob Clampett)
- Porky's Garden (September 11, 1937) (Tex Avery)
- Rover's Rival (October 2, 1937) - First Looney Tunes cartoon with Porky's drum ending. (Bob Clampett)
- The Case of the Stuttering Pig (October 30, 1937) - With Petunia Pig (Frank Tashlin)
- Porky's Double Trouble (November 13, 1937) - With Petunia Pig, final "Fat Porky" cartoon. (Frank Tashlin)
- Porky's Hero Agency (December 4, 1937) (Bob Clampett)

=== 1938 ===
- Porky's Poppa (January 15, 1938) (Bob Clampett)
- Porky at the Crocadero (February 5, 1938) (Frank Tashlin)
- What Price Porky (February 26, 1938) - With Daffy Duck (Bob Clampett)
- Porky's Phoney Express (March 19, 1938) (Cal Howard, Cal Dalton)
- Porky's Five & Ten (April 16, 1938) (Bob Clampett)
- Porky's Hare Hunt (April 30, 1938) - First appearance of a prototypical yet unnamed Bugs Bunny (Ben Hardaway, Cal Dalton)
- Injun Trouble (May 21, 1938) (Bob Clampett)
- Porky the Fireman (June 4, 1938) (Frank Tashlin)
- Porky's Party (June 25, 1938) (Bob Clampett)
- Porky's Spring Planting (July 25, 1938) (Frank Tashlin)
- Porky & Daffy (August 6, 1938) - With Daffy Duck (Bob Clampett)
- Wholly Smoke (August 27, 1938) (Frank Tashlin)
- Porky in Wackyland (September 24, 1938) (Bob Clampett)
- Porky's Naughty Nephew (October 15, 1938) - First appearance of Cicero Pig (called "Pinky" in his two cartoon appearances). (Bob Clampett)
- Porky in Egypt (November 5, 1938) (Bob Clampett)
- The Daffy Doc (November 26, 1938) - With Daffy Duck (Bob Clampett)
- Porky the Gob (December 17, 1938) (Ben Hardaway, Cal Dalton)

=== 1939 ===
- The Lone Stranger and Porky (January 7, 1939) (Bob Clampett)
- It's an Ill Wind (January 28, 1939) (Ben Hardaway, Cal Dalton)
- Porky's Tire Trouble (February 18, 1939) (Bob Clampett)
- Porky's Movie Mystery (March 11, 1939) (Bob Clampett)
- Chicken Jitters (April 1, 1939) (Bob Clampett)
- Porky and Teabiscuit (April 29, 1939) (Ben Hardaway, Cal Dalton)
- Kristopher Kolumbus Jr. (May 13, 1939) (Bob Clampett)
- Polar Pals (June 3, 1939) (Bob Clampett)
- Scalp Trouble (June 24, 1939) - With Daffy Duck (Bob Clampett)
- Old Glory (July 1, 1939) - "Merrie Melodies" series; first Porky Pig cartoon made in color (Chuck Jones)
- Porky's Picnic (July 15, 1939) - With Petunia Pig and Cicero Pig (Bob Clampett)
- Wise Quacks (August 5, 1939) - With Daffy Duck (Bob Clampett)
- Hare-um Scare-um (August 12, 1939) - "Merrie Melodies" series, cameo appearance on a poster (Ben Hardaway, Cal Dalton)
- Porky's Hotel (September 2, 1939) (Bob Clampett)
- Jeepers Creepers (September 23, 1939) (Bob Clampett)
- Naughty Neighbors (October 7, 1939) - With Petunia Pig (Bob Clampett)
- Pied Piper Porky (November 4, 1939) (Bob Clampett)
- Porky the Giant Killer (November 18, 1939) (Ben Hardaway, Cal Dalton)
- Sniffles and the Bookworm (December 2, 1939) - "Sniffles" series, cameo appearance in books (Chuck Jones)
- The Film Fan (December 16, 1939) (Bob Clampett)

=== 1940 ===
- Porky's Last Stand (January 6, 1940) - With Daffy Duck (Bob Clampett)
- Africa Squeaks (January 27, 1940) (Bob Clampett)
- Ali-Baba Bound (February 10, 1940) (Bob Clampett)
- Pilgrim Porky (March 16, 1940) (Bob Clampett)
- Slap Happy Pappy (April 13, 1940) (Bob Clampett)
- Porky's Poor Fish (April 27, 1940) (Bob Clampett)
- You Ought to Be in Pictures (May 18, 1940) - With Daffy Duck (Friz Freleng)
- The Chewin' Bruin (June 8, 1940) (Bob Clampett)
- Porky's Baseball Broadcast (July 6, 1940) (Friz Freleng)
- Patient Porky (August 24, 1940) (Bob Clampett)
- Calling Dr. Porky (September 21, 1940) (Friz Freleng)
- Prehistoric Porky (October 12, 1940) (Bob Clampett)
- The Sour Puss (November 2, 1940) (Bob Clampett)
- Porky's Hired Hand (November 30, 1940) (Friz Freleng)
- The Timid Toreador (December 21, 1940) (Bob Clampett, Norman McCabe)

=== 1941 ===
- Porky's Snooze Reel (January 11, 1941) (Bob Clampett, Norman McCabe)
- Porky's Bear Facts (March 29, 1941) (Friz Freleng)
- Toy Trouble (April 12, 1941) - "Sniffles" series, cameo appearance as toys (Chuck Jones)
- Porky's Preview (April 19, 1941) (Tex Avery)
- Porky's Ant (May 10, 1941) (Chuck Jones)
- A Coy Decoy (June 7, 1941) - "Daffy Duck" series (Bob Clampett)
- Porky's Prize Pony (June 21, 1941) (Chuck Jones)
- Meet John Doughboy (July 5, 1941) - WWII propaganda film (Bob Clampett)
- We, the Animals – Squeak! (August 9, 1941) (Bob Clampett)
- The Henpecked Duck (August 30, 1941) - "Daffy Duck" series (Bob Clampett)
- Notes to You (September 20, 1941) (Friz Freleng)
- Robinson Crusoe Jr. (October 25, 1941) (Norman McCabe)
- Porky's Midnight Matinee (November 22, 1941) (Chuck Jones)
- Porky's Pooch (December 27, 1941) (Bob Clampett)

=== 1942 ===
- Porky's Pastry Pirates (January 17, 1942) (Friz Freleng)
- Who's Who in the Zoo (February 14, 1942) (Norman McCabe)
- Porky's Cafe (February 21, 1942) (Chuck Jones)
- Bugs Bunny (April 2, 1942), a 90-second animated propaganda film for World War II bonds featuring the song Any Bonds Today?; co-starring Bugs Bunny and Elmer Fudd (Bob Clampett)
- My Favorite Duck (December 5, 1942) - "Daffy Duck" series (Chuck Jones)

=== 1943 ===
- Confusions of a Nutzy Spy (January 23, 1943) - WWII propaganda film (Norman McCabe)
- Yankee Doodle Daffy (June 5, 1943) - "Daffy Duck" series (Friz Freleng)
- Porky Pig's Feat (July 17, 1943) - Final black-and-white appearance; with Daffy Duck, and cameo by Bugs Bunny at the end (Frank Tashlin)
- A Corny Concerto (September 18, 1943) - "Merrie Melodies" series; this short contains several of the future stars for Warner Bros. (Bob Clampett)
- An Itch in Time (December 4, 1943) - "Merrie Melodies" series, cameo appearance on a comic book (Bob Clampett)

=== 1944 ===
- Tom Turk and Daffy (February 12, 1944) - "Daffy Duck" series (Chuck Jones)
- Tick Tock Tuckered (April 8, 1944) (slightly revamped colorized version of Porky's Badtime Story) "Daffy Duck" series (Bob Clampett)
- The Swooner Crooner (May 6, 1944) - "Looney Tunes" series (Frank Tashlin)
- Duck Soup to Nuts (May 27, 1944) - "Daffy Duck" series (Friz Freleng)
- Slightly Daffy (June 17, 1944) (slightly revamped colorized version of Scalp Trouble) - "Daffy Duck" series (Friz Freleng)
- Brother Brat (July 15, 1944) (Frank Tashlin)

=== 1945 ===
- Trap Happy Porky (February 24, 1945) (Chuck Jones)
- Wagon Heels (July 28, 1945) (slightly revamped colorized version of Injun Trouble) (Bob Clampett)

=== 1946 ===
- Book Revue (January 5, 1946) - "Daffy Duck" series, cameo appearance on comic book (Bob Clampett)
- Baby Bottleneck (March 16, 1946) - "Daffy Duck" series (Bob Clampett)
- Daffy Doodles (April 6, 1946) - "Daffy Duck" series (Robert McKimson)
- Kitty Kornered (June 8, 1946) (Bob Clampett)
- The Great Piggy Bank Robbery (July 20, 1946) - "Daffy Duck" series, cameo appearance (Bob Clampett)
- Mouse Menace (November 2, 1946) (Arthur Davis)

=== 1947 ===
- One Meat Brawl (January 18, 1947) - only "Porky" cartoon of 1947 (Robert McKimson)
- Little Orphan Airedale (October 4, 1947) - "Charlie Dog" series (Chuck Jones)

=== 1948 ===
- Daffy Duck Slept Here (March 6, 1948) - "Daffy Duck" series (Robert McKimson)
- Nothing but the Tooth (May 1, 1948) (Arthur Davis)
- The Pest That Came to Dinner (September 11, 1948) (Arthur Davis)
- Riff Raffy Daffy (November 27, 1948) - "Daffy Duck" series (Arthur Davis)
- Scaredy Cat (December 18, 1948) - "Sylvester" series (Chuck Jones)

=== 1949 ===
- Awful Orphan (January 29, 1949) - "Charlie Dog" series (Chuck Jones)
- Porky Chops (February 12, 1949) (Arthur Davis)
- Paying the Piper (March 12, 1949) (Robert McKimson)
- Daffy Duck Hunt (March 26, 1949) - "Daffy Duck" series (Robert McKimson)
- Curtain Razor (May 21, 1949) (Friz Freleng)
- Often an Orphan (August 13, 1949) - Final appearance in the "Charlie Dog" series (Chuck Jones)
- Dough for the Do-Do (September 2, 1949) (slightly revamped colorized version of Porky in Wackyland) (Friz Freleng)
- Bye, Bye Bluebeard (October 21, 1949) (Arthur Davis)

=== 1950 ===
- Boobs in the Woods (January 28, 1950) - "Daffy Duck" series (Robert McKimson)
- The Scarlet Pumpernickel (March 4, 1950) - "Daffy Duck" series (Chuck Jones)
- An Egg Scramble (May 27, 1950) (Robert McKimson)
- Golden Yeggs (August 5, 1950) - "Daffy Duck" series (Friz Freleng)
- The Ducksters (September 2, 1950) - "Daffy Duck" series (Chuck Jones)
- Dog Collared (December 2, 1950) (Robert McKimson)

=== 1951 ===
- The Wearing of the Grin (July 14, 1951) - Final solo "Porky" cartoon (Chuck Jones)
- Drip-Along Daffy (November 17, 1951) - "Daffy Duck" series (Chuck Jones)
- The Prize Pest (December 22, 1951) - "Daffy Duck" series (Robert McKimson)

=== 1952 ===
All of Porky's appearances between 1952 and 1953 form part of the "Daffy Duck" series

- Thumb Fun (March 1, 1952) (Robert McKimson)
- Cracked Quack (July 5, 1952) (Friz Freleng)
- Fool Coverage (December 13, 1952) (Robert McKimson)

=== 1953 ===
- Duck Dodgers in the 24½th Century (July 25, 1953) (Chuck Jones)

=== 1954 ===
- Claws for Alarm (May 22, 1954) - "Sylvester" series (Chuck Jones)
- My Little Duckaroo (November 27, 1954) - "Daffy Duck" series (Chuck Jones)

=== 1955 ===
- Jumpin' Jupiter (August 6, 1955) - "Sylvester" series (Chuck Jones)
- Dime to Retire (September 3, 1955) - "Daffy Duck" series (Robert McKimson)

=== 1956 ===
All remaining cartoons during the golden era featuring Porky (except the 1964 Bugs Bunny and Yosemite Sam cartoon Dumb Patrol) form part of the "Daffy Duck" series

- Rocket Squad (March 10, 1956) (Chuck Jones)
- Deduce, You Say! (September 29, 1956) (Chuck Jones)

=== 1957 ===
- Boston Quackie (June 22, 1957) (Robert McKimson)

=== 1958 ===
- Robin Hood Daffy (March 8, 1958) (Chuck Jones)

=== 1959 ===
- China Jones (February 14, 1959) (Robert McKimson)

=== 1961 ===
- Daffy's Inn Trouble (September 23, 1961) (Robert McKimson)

=== 1964 ===
- Dumb Patrol (January 18, 1964) - Cameo, with Bugs Bunny and Yosemite Sam (Gerry Chiniquy)

=== 1965 ===
- Corn on the Cop (July 24, 1965) - Final regular appearance (Irv Spector)

=== 1966 ===
- Mucho Locos (February 5, 1966) - Cameo, with Speedy Gonzales (Robert McKimson) appears in archival footage of Robin Hood Daffy (1958)

== Post-Golden age media ==
=== 1972 ===
- Daffy Duck and Porky Pig Meet the Groovie Goolies (TV special)

=== 1976 ===
- Bugs and Daffy's Carnival of the Animals (TV special)

=== 1977 ===
- Bugs Bunny in Space (TV special)
- Bugs Bunny's Easter Special (TV special)

=== 1978 ===
- How Bugs Bunny Won the West (TV special)
- A Connecticut Rabbit in King Arthur's Court (TV special)
- Bugs Bunny's Howl-oween Special (TV special)

=== 1979 ===
- The Bugs Bunny/Road Runner Movie (feature film)
- Bugs Bunny's Thanksgiving Diet (TV special)
- Bugs Bunny's Looney Christmas Tales (TV special)

=== 1980 ===
- The Bugs Bunny Mystery Special (TV special)
- Duck Dodgers and the Return of the 24½th Century - "Daffy Duck" series (part of the TV special Daffy Duck's Thanks-For-Giving Special).

=== 1981 ===
- Bugs Bunny: All-American Hero (TV special)
- The Looney Looney Looney Bugs Bunny Movie (feature film)

=== 1982 ===
- Bugs Bunny's Mad World of Television (TV special)
- Bugs Bunny's 3rd Movie: 1001 Rabbit Tales (feature film)

=== 1983 ===
- Daffy Duck's Fantastic Island (feature film)

=== 1988 ===
- Who Framed Roger Rabbit (feature film by Touchstone Pictures)
- Daffy Duck's Quackbusters (feature film)
- Bugs vs. Daffy: Battle of the Music Video Stars (TV special); final time Porky was voiced by Mel Blanc via new footage.

=== 1990 ===
- The Earth Day Special (TV special); first time Porky was voiced by Jeff Bergman.
- Happy Birthday, Bugs!: 50 Looney Years (TV special); voiced by Jeff Bergman.
- Gremlins 2: The New Batch (feature film); voiced by Jeff Bergman.
- Tiny Toon Adventures (TV series; 1990–1995); first time Porky was voiced by Bob Bergen, Rob Paulsen, Noel Blanc, Joe Alaskey, and Greg Burson.

=== 1991 ===
- Bugs Bunny's Overtures to Disaster (TV special); voiced by Jeff Bergman.

=== 1992 ===
- Invasion of the Bunny Snatchers - "Bugs Bunny" series; voiced by Jeff Bergman.

=== 1993 ===
- Animaniacs (TV series; 1993–1998); final time Porky was voiced by Rob Paulsen and Greg Burson.

=== 1995 ===
- Carrotblanca - "Bugs Bunny" series, cameo

=== 1996 ===
- Superior Duck - "Daffy Duck" series; only time Porky was voiced by Eric Goldberg.
- Space Jam; voiced by Bob Bergen.

=== 1998 ===
- Quest for Camelot Sing-a-Longs (direct-to-video); voiced by Bob Bergen.
- Looney Tunes Sing-a-Longs (direct-to-video); voiced by Bob Bergen.

=== 2001 ===
- Baby Looney Tunes (TV series; 2001–2006)

=== 2002 ===
- The 1st 13th Annual Fancy Anvil Awards Show Program Special: Live in Stereo (TV special); voiced by Jeff Bergman.

=== 2003 ===
- Cartoon Network's Funniest Bloopers and Other Embarrassing Moments (TV special); voiced by Jeff Bergman.
- Looney Tunes: Reality Check (direct-to-video); voiced by Bob Bergen.
- Looney Tunes: Stranger Than Fiction (direct-to-video); voiced by Bob Bergen.
- Duck Dodgers (TV series; 2003–2005); voiced by Bob Bergen, as The Eager Young Space Cadet
- Looney Tunes: Back in Action (feature film); voiced by Bob Bergen.

=== 2004 ===
- My Generation G...G...Gap - First "Porky" cartoon since 1951. Planned for theatrical release, but only released on Australian edition DVD of Looney Tunes: Back in Action. It was also released on Blu-ray and can be found on HBO Max. First and only time Porky was voiced by Billy West.

=== 2006 ===
- Porky and Daffy in the William Tell Overture; voiced by Jeff Bergman.
- Bah, Humduck! A Looney Tunes Christmas (direct-to-video); voiced by Bob Bergen.

=== 2011 ===
- The Looney Tunes Show (TV series; 2011–2014); voiced by Bob Bergen.

=== 2015 ===
- Looney Tunes: Rabbits Run (direct-to-video); voiced by Bob Bergen.
- New Looney Tunes (TV series; 2015–2020); voiced by Bob Bergen.

=== 2020 ===
- Looney Tunes Cartoons (streaming series; 2020–2023); voiced by Bob Bergen.

=== 2021 ===
- Teen Titans Go! See Space Jam (direct-to-video); voiced by Bob Bergen via archive footage from Space Jam.
- Space Jam: A New Legacy (feature film); first time Porky was voiced by Eric Bauza.

=== 2022 ===
- Bugs Bunny Builders (TV series; 2022–2025); voiced by Bob Bergen.

=== 2024 ===
- The Day the Earth Blew Up (feature film); voiced by Eric Bauza.

=== 2026 ===
- Stuart Fails to Save the Universe (TV series); voiced by Mel Blanc via archive footage.
- Coyote vs. Acme (feature film); final time Porky was voiced by Eric Bauza.
- Daffy Season; voiced by Jeff Bergman.

== See also ==
- The Bugs Bunny Show (1960–2000)

== Sources ==
- Maltin, Leonard (1980). Of Mice and Magic: A History of American Animated Cartoons. McGraw-Hill. ISBN 0-07-039835-6.
- Sandler, Kevin (1998). Reading the rabbit : explorations in Warner Bros. animation. Rutgers University Press. ISBN 0-8135-2538-1.
