= Porky's Hotel =

1939 film by Robert Clampett

- Title card
- Directed by: Robert Clampett
- Produced by: Leon Schlesinger
- Starring: Mel Blanc
- Music by: Carl W. Stalling
- Animation by: Norman McCabe; John Carey
- Color process: Black and white
- Production company: Leon Schlesinger Productions
- Distributed by: Warner Bros. Pictures
- Release date: September 2, 1939
- Running time: 7 min
- Country: United States
- Language: English

Porky's Hotel is a 1939 American animated comedy short film directed by Robert Clampett. The short was released on September 2, 1939. It is part of the Looney Tunes series and the 63rd cartoon to feature Porky Pig.

== Plot ==
Porky Pig operates a hotel in Cheesecake Center. He serves an injured rich goat who demands peace and quiet. Dizzy Duck appears and is booed by the goat after he tries to interrupt. Dizzy Duck is annoyed by a mischievous fly, who coerces him to chase it with a hammer. It lands on a mini replica of Venus de Milo, who slaps it with her foot. Both Dizzy and the fly are slammed into the wall by Porky opening a door, though the fly is unscathed.

At 12 p.m., Porky Pig brings the goat his lunch; unbeknownst to Porky, the goat dumps the food and eats the plate instead. Dizzy continues chasing the fly, who lands on the goat's injured foot and coerces Dizzy into hitting the foot. The goat angrily chases Dizzy on his wheelchair, slamming him through a door and eventually into a wall while Porky helps an old pelican guest nearby. They destroy a painting and pop their heads through respectively a Native American and a captive John Smith.

== Home media ==
Porky's Hotel is available on disc 4 of the Porky Pig 101 DVD set.

== See also ==
- Porky Pig filmography
- Looney Tunes and Merrie Melodies filmography (1930–1939)
