= Porky's Bear Facts =

1941 film by Isadore Freleng

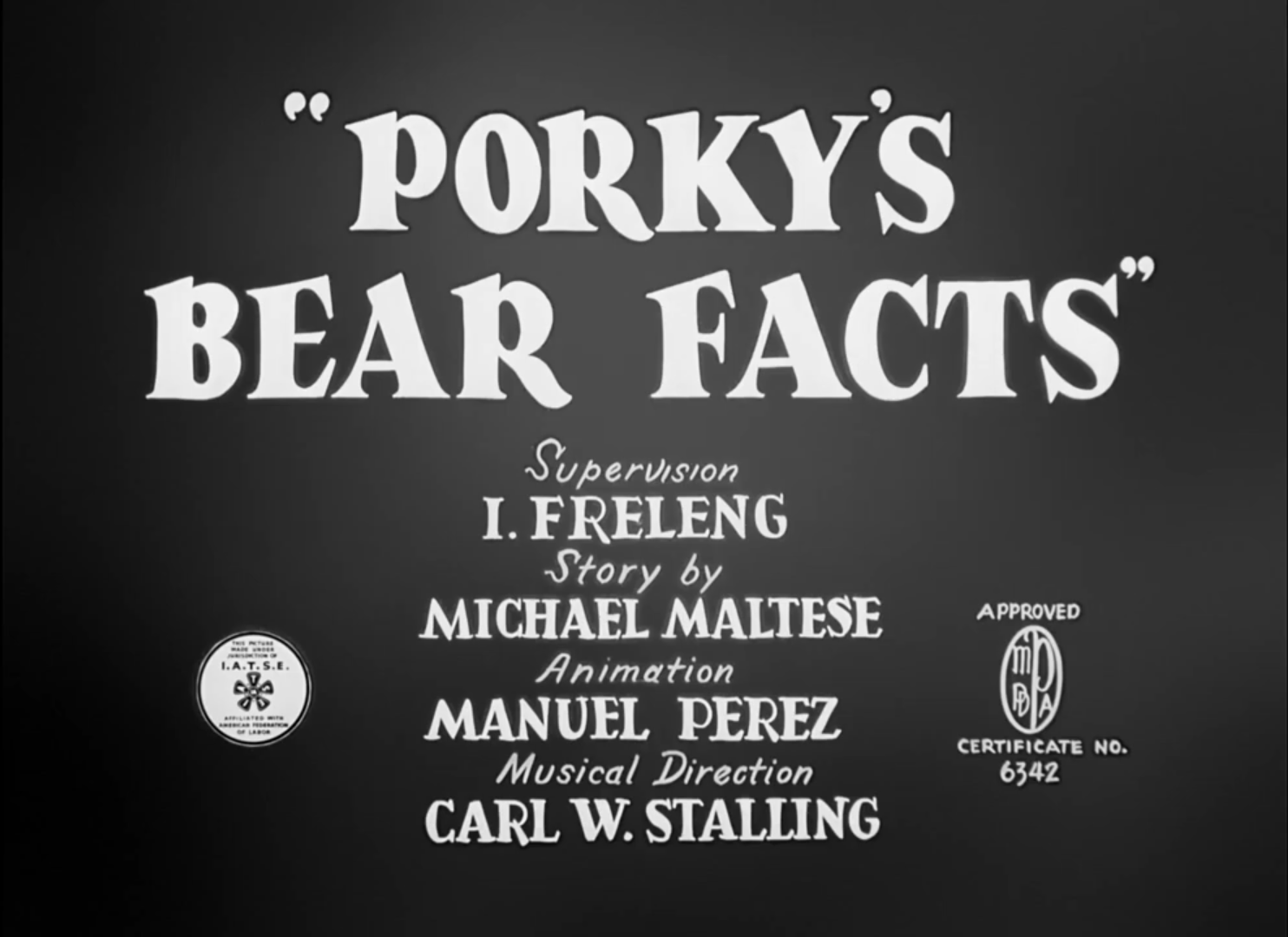
- Title card
- Directed by: Isadore Freleng
- Story by: Michael Maltese
- Produced by: Leon Schlesinger
- Starring: Mel Blanc
- Music by: Carl W. Stalling
- Animation by: Manuel Perez
- Color process: Black and white
- Production company: Leon Schlesinger Productions
- Distributed by: Warner Bros. Pictures
- Release date: March 29, 1941
- Running time: 7 mins
- Country: United States
- Language: English

Porky's Bear Facts is a 1941 American animated comedy short film directed by Isadore Freleng. The short was released on March 29, 1941. It is part of the Looney Tunes series, the 84th cartoon to feature Porky Pig and the first cartoon to credit prominent animator Manuel Perez.

== Plot ==
Porky and his animals works hard on his farm. The hens lay eggs while even the dog prepares a jar to safeguard its bone. His neighbor, a hillbilly bear, refuses to work and sings about the virtue of laziness with other animals, including his cow, hens and a mouse, who read and play cards.

On the last day of winter, the bear realizes he has not prepared for the winter, with even Old Mother Hubbard leaving a note in his cupboard to add insult to injury. He and his dog search the remains of the canned food they had purchased and eaten, finding a single bean that they decide to share, only to have it stolen by the mouse. The bear goes insane and attempts to eat his dog. He stops when they notice Porky and his dog eating dinner. Porky refuses but relents to let him eat once. He apologizes for his behavior but returns to his old ways after spring arrives during the meal.

== Home media ==
Porky's Bear Facts is available on disc 5 of the Porky Pig 101 DVD set.

== See also ==
- Porky Pig filmography
- Looney Tunes and Merrie Melodies filmography (1940–1949)
- List of animated films in the public domain in the United States

Preceded by Porky's Snooze Reel	Porky Pig filmography 1941	Succeeded by Porky's Preview
