= Porky the Wrestler =

1937 film by Fred Avery

- Title card
- Directed by: Fred Avery
- Produced by: Leon Schlesinger
- Starring: Joe Dougherty
- Music by: Carl W. Stalling
- Animation by: Charles Jones; Elmer Wait
- Color process: Black and white
- Production company: Leon Schlesinger Productions
- Distributed by: Warner Bros. Productions; The Vitaphone Corporation
- Release date: January 9, 1937
- Running time: 7 min
- Country: United States
- Language: English

Porky the Wrestler is a 1937 American animated comedy short film directed by Fred Avery. The short was released on January 9, 1937. It is the 80th film in the Looney Tunes series and the eighteenth cartoon to feature Porky Pig.

== Plot ==
A highly anticipated wrestling match occurs in town, so a multitude of animals, including Porky Pig, struggle while hitchhiking. A car which Porky Pig attempts to hitchhike breaks down, with the driver also hitchhiking. A driver refuses Porky service after Porky requests to be driven to the match. Fortunately, one of the wrestlers generously takes him in. Unfortunately, the wrestler falls into the sewers, causing Porky to be confused as the wrestler.

Porky is hurried to the fight against a hulking wrestler. He is immediately thrown like a ball and pinned, but uses his size to his advantage as he sneaks away, leading to the wrestler to pin his own leg. To the confusion of Porky and the referee, the wrestler immediately starts to expel smoke like a train and runs at a steady pace, with them being chased and somehow holding on him like passengers. Amenities are served, the bell is rung and an audience member opens the wall to find that the arena is somehow moving. Porky lets go and the wrestler immediately does the "Airplane Spin", leaping while holding Porky, flying like an airplane then pinning him. Horrified, Porky hides in the carpet but is slammed into one of the corners; this proves to be the wrestler's undoing, as he launches Porky into the back of his own head and knocks himself out. Porky is declared the winner by proxy, as the wrestler fails to alert the referee on time of his consciousness and flattens his hand instead.

== Home media ==
Porky the Wrestler is available on disc 1 of the Porky Pig 101 DVD set.

== See also ==
- Porky Pig filmography
- Looney Tunes and Merrie Melodies filmography (1930–1939)
