= Porky's Poor Fish =

1940 film by Robert Clampett

- Title card
- Directed by: Robert Clampett
- Story by: Melvin Millar
- Produced by: Leon Schlesinger
- Starring: Mel Blanc
- Music by: Carl W. Stalling
- Animation by: Dave Hoffman
- Color process: Black and white
- Production company: Leon Schlesinger Productions
- Distributed by: Warner Bros. Pictures
- Release date: April 27, 1940
- Running time: 6 min
- Country: United States
- Language: English

Porky's Poor Fish is a 1940 American animated comedy short film directed by Robert Clampett. It is part of the Looney Tunes series and the 74th cartoon to feature Porky Pig.

== Plot ==
A mouse skips to his mousehole while a cat follows, only to unknowingly cause the cat to crash into a wall. Elsewhere, Porky Pig operates a pet store where he sells a plethora of fish normally not expected to survive in an urban environment, including three singing fish, two electric eels named AC and DC, a perch who literally perches on wood, a "holey" mackerel, filet of sole (literally depicted as fish resembling shoes) and an octopus dancer.

As Porky heads out for lunch, the cat from earlier finds the pet store and to his joy notices fish. He tries to catch a small fish placed with an oyster who hides under a literal oyster bed. A turtle notices and rides a seahorse to notify every fish in the aquarium, including a tuna, who hatches eggs as "the chicken of the sea", with its offspring going to war on the cat, as well as flying fish. A hammerhead shark hits the cat with the hammer on its head, causing the cat to be electrocuted by one of the electric eels, while the flying fish save the small fish the cat caught. Porky is surprised by the cat being thrown out of the store. The cat sits in defeat but attempts to catch the mouse from earlier again, only to be horrified by its roar.

== Home media ==
This short was released on the Looney Tunes Golden Collection: Volume 4 DVD box set on November 14, 2006, and on the Porky Pig 101 DVD box set on September 19, 2017.

== See also ==
- Porky Pig filmography
- Looney Tunes and Merrie Melodies filmography (1940–1949)
