= The Sour Puss =

1940 film by Robert Clampett

- Title card
- Directed by: Robert Clampett
- Story by: Warren Foster
- Produced by: Leon Schlesinger
- Starring: Mel Blanc
- Music by: Carl W. Stalling
- Animation by: Vive Risto; Dave Hoffman
- Color process: Black and white
- Production company: Leon Schlesinger Productions
- Distributed by: Warner Bros. Pictures
- Release date: November 2, 1940
- Running time: 7 min
- Country: United States
- Language: English

The Sour Puss is a 1940 American animated comedy short film directed by Robert Clampett. The short was released on November 2, 1940. It is part of the Looney Tunes and the 80th cartoon to feature Porky Pig.

== Plot ==
Porky excitedly plans a fishing trip with his cat, promising fish for dinner. The cat's antics lead to a comedic chain of events as they encounter a flying fish that outsmarts them both. Eventually, they mistake a shark for the elusive catch, prompting a hasty retreat. In the end, the shark humorously remarks on the absurdity of their adventure as the cartoon concludes.

== Home media ==
DVD:

- Looney Tunes Golden Collection: Volume 4
- Porky Pig 101

== See also ==
- Porky Pig filmography
- Looney Tunes and Merrie Melodies filmography (1940–1949)
