= Porky's Building =

1937 film by Frank Tash

- Title card
- Directed by: Frank Tash
- Produced by: Leon Schlesinger
- Starring: Mel Blanc
- Music by: Carl W. Stalling
- Animation by: Volney White; Norman McCabe
- Color process: Black-and-white
- Production company: Leon Schlesinger Productions
- Distributed by: Warner Bros. Productions; The Vitaphone Corporation
- Release date: June 19, 1937
- Running time: 7 min
- Country: United States
- Language: English

Porky's Building is a 1937 American animated comedy short film directed by Frank Tash. The short was released on June 19, 1937. It is the 86th film in the Looney Tunes series and the 24th cartoon to feature Porky Pig.

== Plot ==
The city commissions a town hall, with architects Porky Pig and Dirty Digg volunteering. They draft plans that cost the lowest and the same, so the mayor instructs them to construct their plans of the town hall, but the one finished quickest would be the town hall chosen.

The two architects get to work, with Dirty accidentally lifting the city's street lights with one pull. A construction worker tries to detonate dynamite, but is constantly disrupted by a crowd, he lures the crowd to the dynamite and sneaks away, killing them in the detonation without a second thought. Porky instructs animals to mix concrete efficiently, though Dirty sabotages a worker who delivers concrete. A pelican delivering concrete is distracted by a fish dispatched by Dirty, dropping the mixture on Porky. During the process, a rabbit volunteers repeatedly which Porky refuses.

Dirty unleashes a brick-laying machine, which gives him an unfair advantage as he is able to build at 20 stories above Porky's progress. Porky reluctantly allows the rabbit to lay bricks, only for the rabbit to build at super speed and catch up to Dirty. Dirty accidentally pulls the lever to reverse while trying to speed up, causing his building to be demolished; the machine catches so many bricks it explodes, sending Dirty into a hole which Porky's bulldozer has dug. Porky is cheered for completing the city hall on time, and he gives credit to the rabbit for his hard work.

== Home media ==
Porky's Building is available on disc 2 of the Porky Pig 101 DVD set.

== See also ==
- Porky Pig filmography
- Looney Tunes and Merrie Melodies filmography (1930–1939)
