= Porky's Hired Hand =

1940 film by Isadore Freleng

- Title card
- Directed by: Isadore Freleng
- Story by: Dave Monahan
- Produced by: Leon Schlesinger
- Starring: Mel Blanc
- Music by: Carl W. Stalling
- Animation by: Richard Bickenbach
- Color process: Black and white
- Production company: Leon Schlesinger Productions
- Distributed by: Warner Bros. Pictures
- Release date: November 30, 1940
- Running time: 7 min
- Country: United States
- Language: English

Porky's Hired Hand is a 1940 American animated comedy short film directed by Isadore Freleng. The short was released on November 30, 1940. It is part of the Looney Tunes and the 81st cartoon to feature Porky Pig.

== Plot ==
Porky owns a chicken ranch and hires Gregory Grunt from an agency, who turns out to be too incompetent for the job. As Porky leaves, he disregards Porky's instructions and falls asleep with the chickens. A fox appears and steals all of Porky's chickens, including a sleepwalking hen but excluding a weak hen who is skin and bones. He accidentally gives Gregory time to react to his presence, who blocks the exit promptly.

The fox proposes forming a business partnership with Gregory to sell the stolen chickens. As the fox packs up and prepares to leave, he instructs Gregory to retrieve bags of feed and accidentally enters the incubator room. He realizes he is trapped after swallowing the key. Horrified, he accidentally drinks sand while finding water. Despite trying to save the fox, Gregory turns on him the moment Porky enters with his shotgun. They find the fox shrunk and furious about the ordeal.

== Home media ==
This short is available on disc 5 of the Porky Pig 101 DVD set.

== See also ==
- Porky Pig filmography
- Looney Tunes and Merrie Melodies filmography (1940–1949)
