= The Lone Stranger and Porky =

1939 film by Robert Clampett

- Title card
- Directed by: Robert Clampett
- Produced by: Leon Schlesinger
- Starring: Mel Blanc
- Music by: Carl W. Stalling
- Animation by: Isadore Ellis; Robert Cannon
- Color process: Black and white
- Production company: Leon Schlesinger Productions
- Distributed by: Warner Bros. Pictures; The Vitaphone Corporation
- Release date: January 7, 1939
- Running time: 7 min
- Country: United States
- Language: English

The Lone Stranger and Porky is a 1939 American animated comedy short film directed by Robert Clampett. The cartoon was released on January 7, 1939. It is part of the Looney Tunes series and the 51st cartoon to feature Porky Pig. It is one in a number of experimental Looney Tunes films directed by Clampett, which he accomplished by exploiting the loophole of using Porky Pig to a bare minimum.

== Plot ==
The film is mostly non-verbal outside of the humorous narration. The Lone Stranger, a parody of the Lone Ranger, serves justice in 1865 after the American Civil War. He lives in a hideout that remains undiscovered despite searchlights literally pointing to their direction and rides his horse for the entire day until he sleeps.

Porky drives a stagecoach while the narrator summons a villain, who slams traffic lights down a cliff to stop Porky and holds him at gunpoint. The Lone Stranger's Native American scout Prompto (a parody of Tonto) spies on them and reports through a television broadcaster to the Lone Stranger's magic mirror, which notifies him of the incident. The villain and his horse use a tree branch to incapacitate the Lone Stranger and shoots him, but somehow destroys the cliff near him without hurting him. The Lone Stranger and the villain engage in a fistfight and the former is kicked off a cliff, leading to a literal cliffhanger which is solved by the Lone Stranger walking up the cliff and slamming the villain into a boulder, which cracks and forms a jail cell around him. Meanwhile, the villain's horse has no intention to fight the Lone Stranger's horse and instead falls in love with her, somehow producing numerous children, including a horse resembling his father, who follow the Lone Stranger after Porky is freed.

== Home media ==
The Lone Stranger and Porky is available on disc 3 of the Porky Pig 101 DVD set.

== See also ==
- Porky Pig filmography
- Looney Tunes and Merrie Melodies filmography (1930–1939)
