= Chicken Jitters =

1939 film by Robert Clampett

- Title card
- Directed by: Robert Clampett
- Produced by: Leon Schlesinger
- Starring: Mel Blanc
- Music by: Carl W. Stalling
- Animation by: Robert Cannon; Vive Risto
- Color process: Black and white
- Production company: Leon Schlesinger Productions
- Distributed by: Warner Bros. Pictures; The Vitaphone Corporation
- Release date: April 1, 1939
- Running time: 7 min
- Country: United States
- Language: English

Chicken Jitters is a 1939 American animated comedy short film directed by Robert Clampett. The short was released on March 11, 1939. It is part of the Looney Tunes series and the 55th cartoon to feature Porky Pig.

== Plot ==
Porky operates a poultry farm filled with only chickens. He inspects eggs and finds a chick who refuses to hatch and demands privacy. Meanwhile, a duck and her children, who resemble but are otherwise distinct from Daffy Duck, walk towards a pond, except for an infantile duckling whose shell does not come off, causing him to go the other way. His shell is destroyed after he charges forward, causing him to notice the audience. As Porky feeds earthworms to his chicks, the duckling struggles to eat one, who hits him with a mallet.

A hen's eggs hatch, attracting the attention of a fox, who intends to eat them. The duckling finds his way near the chicks and escapes with them, but the hen scoops them up and leaves them behind. Porky tries to protect them with an axe, which is unfortunately shrunken after the fox shoots it with a revolver. The duck's mother hears her child's call for help and realizes his absence, dashing towards the farm with her other children to dive-bomb and peck the fox. As the fox punches Porky, the ducks trap the fox in a mannequin and kill him in an explosion which turns him into a fur coat.

== Home media ==
Chicken Jitters is available on disc 3 of the Porky Pig 101 DVD set.

== See also ==
- Porky Pig filmography
- Looney Tunes and Merrie Melodies filmography (1930–1939)
