= Porky the Giant Killer =

1939 film by Ben Hardaway and Cal Dalton

- Title card
- Directed by: Ben Hardaway; Cal Dalton
- Story by: Melvin Millar
- Produced by: Leon Schlesinger
- Starring: Mel Blanc
- Music by: Carl W. Stalling
- Animation by: Gil Turner
- Production company: Leon Schlesinger Productions
- Distributed by: Warner Bros. Pictures
- Release date: November 15, 1939
- Running time: 7 min
- Country: United States
- Language: English

Porky the Giant Killer is a 1939 American animated comedy short film directed by Ben Hardaway and Cal Dalton. The short was released on November 15, 1939. It is part of the Looney Tunes series and the 67th cartoon to feature Porky Pig.

== Plot ==
Porky Pig wakes up to find the townsfolk marching to kill a nearby giant purely for malice, which he blindly follows after fashioning a bat out of an abandoned table. The actual giant is depicted as a kindly figure who cares for his infant son. The townsfolk cowardly escape after the giant makes his presence known, but leave behind Porky.

Porky tries to sneak in further but is blown by hot steam into the baby giant's bed. He bites the baby's finger, but realizes he simply wants to play. He ends up being launched multiple times due to the baby being unaware of his incredible strength. Porky tries to soothe the baby when he cries by giving him milk and doing a trick with the milk bottle, which ends up sucker punching the baby. Porky soothes the baby by playing the piano and singing the ABC Song with his stutter, which the father giant appreciates, but still causes Porky to hide in fear. Not realizing the giant means no ill will, Porky runs from the giant and falls into the moat, which the giant drinks the water from and catches him. Porky is begrudgingly made to play the piano again while the two giants sleep.

== Home media ==
The short was released on disc 4 of the Porky Pig 101 DVD set.

== See also ==
- Porky Pig filmography
- Looney Tunes and Merrie Melodies filmography (1930–1939)
