= Porky at the Crocadero =

1938 film by Frank Tashlin

- Title card
- Directed by: Frank Tashlin
- Story by: Lew Landsman
- Produced by: Leon Schlesinger
- Starring: Mel Blanc
- Music by: Carl W. Stalling
- Animation by: Volney White
- Color process: Black and white
- Production company: Leon Schlesinger Productions
- Distributed by: Warner Bros. Productions; The Vitaphone Corporation
- Release date: February 5, 1938
- Running time: 7 min
- Country: United States
- Language: English

Porky at the Crocadero is a 1938 American animated comedy short film directed by Frank Tashlin. The short was released on February 5, 1938. It is the 97th film in the Looney Tunes series and the 35th cartoon to feature Porky Pig.

== Plot ==
Porky Pig walks by the Crocadero nightclub, wanting to be a bandleader as he has professional musical qualifications. As he fantasizes about being as famous as conductors like Leopold Stokowski, Rudy Vallée and Benny Goodman, he realizes he cannot afford a dinner at the place, which cost $25 per plate (the food costs 50 cents), while he only has one scent [sic]. Porky finds the nightclub recruiting a boy, which he happily obliges and is assigned to wash dishes, which he does not mind to earn money. He is fired after being distracted by a fly.

As the patrons demands music, the nightclub's owner is shocked when his bandleaders fail to show up due to a delayed flight. Desperately thinking of a solution, he remembers Porky's credentials and quickly drags him to the nightclub and dresses him up as Paul Whiteman. He competently directs the musicians while struggling to maintain the extra weight on his costume. A penguin waiter repeatedly has a served drink sucked up by a trombone to his chagrin. Porky then impersonates Guy Lombardo. An old crooner, a caricature of Carmen Lombardo, struggles to sing before being wheeled away by a clearly insane caretaker. Porky impersonates Cab Calloway in blackface, switching costumes into a stereotypical Chinese person at one point. As his performance ends, the penguin waiter has had enough and drinks before the trombone does.

== Home media ==
DVD:

- Looney Tunes Golden Collection: Volume 5
- Porky Pig 101

== See also ==
- Porky Pig filmography
- Looney Tunes and Merrie Melodies filmography (1930–1939)
