= The Chewin' Bruin =

1940 film by Robert Clampett

- Title card
- Directed by: Robert Clampett
- Produced by: Leon Schlesinger
- Starring: Mel Blanc
- Music by: Carl W. Stalling
- Animation by: Norman McCabe; Vive Risto
- Color process: Black-and-white
- Production company: Leon Schlesinger Productions
- Distributed by: Warner Bros. Pictures
- Release date: June 8, 1940
- Running time: 6 min
- Country: United States
- Language: English

The Chewin' Bruin is a 1940 American animated comedy short film directed by Robert Clampett. The cartoon was released on June 8, 1940. It is part of the Looney Tunes series and the 75th cartoon to feature Porky Pig.

== Plot ==
Porky Pig stays at a lodge owned by a retired hunter, who tells the story of the mounted bear head on the wall behind him.

Thirty years ago, the hunter and his dog try to hunt a reindeer with literal musical horns as horns and some muskrats. They are trailed by a bear, who causes the dog to be literally frozen in fear on the ice. The hunter notices the bear after it is interested in the hunter's chewing tobacco. He runs home and throws a bear trap in front of his lodge, which does not hurt the bear in the slightest. The bear effortlessly destroys the house, frightening the dog and the hunter again. The hunter narrowly escapes capture but his shotgun is also fearful of the bear. Upon realizing the bear solely wanted his chewing tobacco, the hunter is angered and beats the bear to death.

At the present, the severed bear head is revealed to be somehow alive and spits the decades-old tobacco into a nearby spittoon, much to the hunter and Porky's bewilderment.

== Home media ==
This short is available on disc 4 of the Porky Pig 101 DVD set.

== See also ==
- Porky Pig filmography
- Looney Tunes and Merrie Melodies filmography (1940–1949)
