= Porky's Midnight Matinee =

1941 film by Charles M. Jones

- Title card
- Directed by: Charles M. Jones
- Story by: Rich Hogan (uncredited)
- Produced by: Leon Schlesinger
- Starring: Mel Blanc
- Music by: Carl W. Stalling
- Animation by: Robert Cannon
- Color process: Black-and-white
- Production company: Leon Schlesinger Productions
- Distributed by: Warner Bros. Pictures
- Release date: November 22, 1941
- Running time: 8 min
- Country: United States
- Language: English

Porky's Midnight Matinee is a 1941 American animated comedy short film directed by Charles M. Jones. The short was released on November 22, 1941. It is part of the Looney Tunes series and the 94th cartoon to feature Porky Pig.

== Plot ==
Porky is working backstage flipping switches and things while singing and whistling "You Oughta Be in Pictures", but he is stopped by a "PSST". It came from an African pygmy ant (the same one from Porky's Ant) in a cage and he wants Porky to let him out. So Porky open the cage door and did let him out. When the ant goes out, he makes a dash for it. Porky who spun and fell because of the dashing ant looks at the bottom of the cage and is surprised by the price of the ant, $162,422,503.51 (equivalent to $3,106,446,395.70 in 2022). Porky then sees the ant on a rope and runs after him, but he trips over a trunk and falls into it. He emerges from the trunk wearing a magician's hat and takes it off only to find that a magic rabbit is sitting on his head. The ant mocks and laughs at Porky's misfortune. Eventually, the rabbit comes off of Porky's head, he put on his work hat back on and ran upstairs.

The ant sees Porky coming and swing onto a platform. The ant then walks on a high wire with Porky right on his tail. The ant stops Porky and shows him what's down below, indicating that Porky's high up. Porky nervously tries to walk back to the platform, but the ant wiggles and jiggles that wire and causes Porky to fall down. The ant then slides down a rope, reaches the bottom and spots a table full of food. So he decides to go there. First the ant jumps up & down on a sandwich, falls into the bread, takes a piece of it and eats it. Porky just caught up with the ant and attempts squish him by slamming his hand down on the sandwich, but he got away. He then finds the ant on a jar of mustard and sticks his hand in there. But again, the ant escapes. The ant while sitting on a soda bottle then showed Porky how to remove his hand from the jar, which is to smash it on the table. Porky succeeds, but his hand is covered in mustard and sticks it to his mouth. The ant then gave Porky a bottle of turpentine to drink. This may be an attempt to kill Porky as the ant then shows Porky a lighted match. But Porky was no fool. He attempts to catch the ant by diving onto the table, but all he got is raining food and meat on his head. Porky then decides to lure the ant out of hiding by holding a stick of candy cane for the ant. The ant took the bait, but he switches the candy for a stick of dynamite. Porky throws the stick of dynamite and it pushes away the candy. Porky tries to warn the ant about the dynamite, but the latter doesn't listen, he just lies there on the dynamite. Porky hides as the dynamite explodes, but it didn't blow the ant up. Instead it took the ant back to his cage. Porky smiles now that the ant is back where he belongs and the now scorched black ant smiles too as the cartoon ends.

== Cast ==
- Mel Blanc as Porky Pig

== Home media ==
Porky's Midnight Matinee was released uncut on Porky Pig 101, Disc 5.

== See also ==
- Looney Tunes and Merrie Melodies filmography (1940–1949)
- Porky Pig filmography
- List of animated films in the public domain in the United States
