= Porky the Gob =

1938 film by Ben Hardaway and Cal Dalton

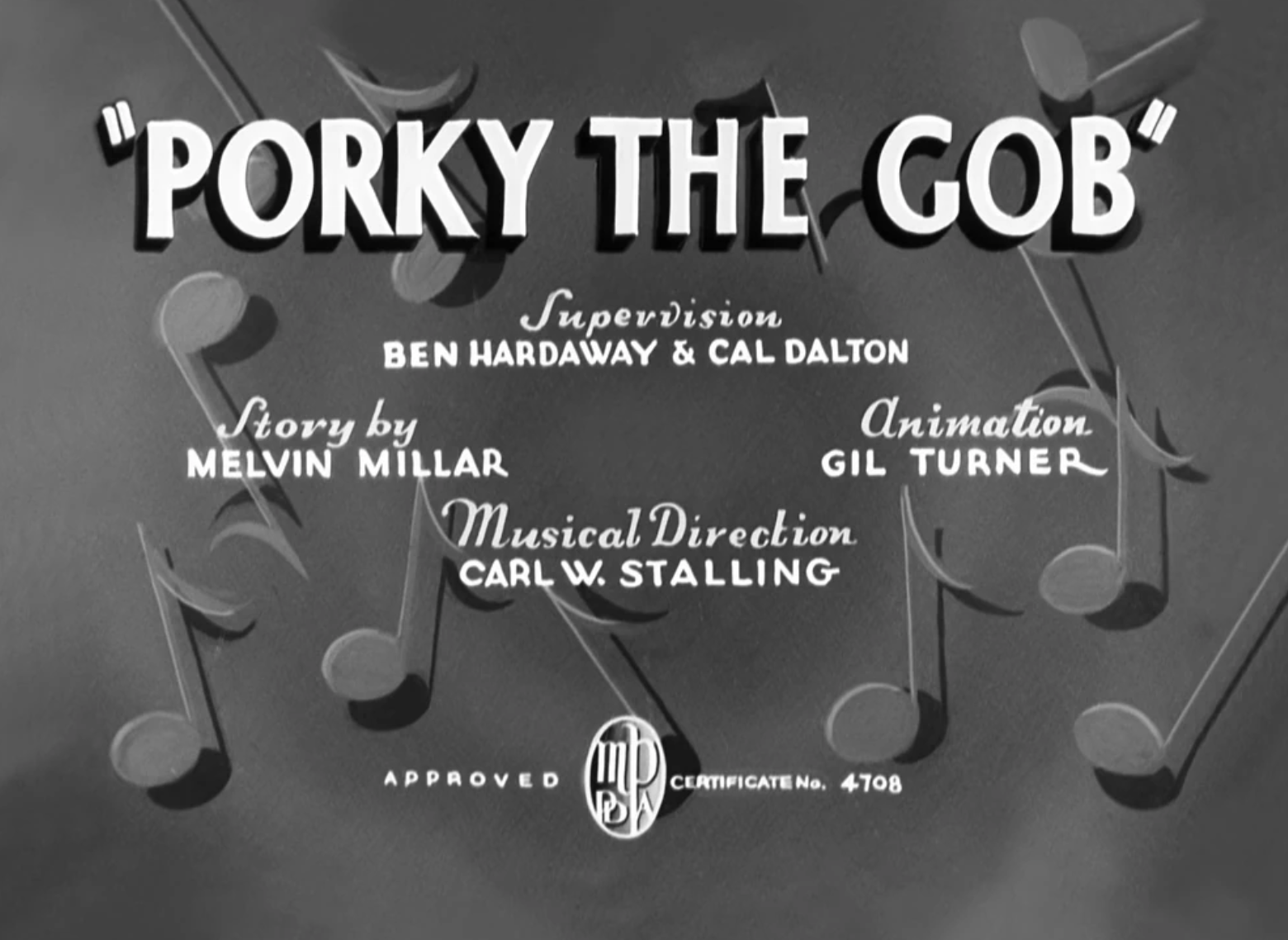
- Title card
- Directed by: Ben Hardaway; Cal Dalton
- Story by: Melvin Millar
- Produced by: Leon Schlesinger
- Starring: Mel Blanc
- Music by: Carl W. Stalling
- Animation by: Gil Turner
- Color process: Black and white
- Production company: Leon Schlesinger Productions
- Distributed by: Warner Bros. Pictures; The Vitaphone Corporation
- Release date: December 17, 1938
- Running time: 8 min
- Country: United States
- Language: English

Porky the Gob is a 1938 American animated comedy short film directed by Ben Hardaway and Cal Dalton. The cartoon was released on December 17, 1938. It is part of the Looney Tunes series and the 50th cartoon to feature Porky Pig.

== Plot ==
Porky Pig works as a sailor on a warship and struggles to sing "The Song of the Marines" alongside his peers. The sailors are summoned and stands before they are called to the mess hall after the captain wakes up from a nap. The captain stops the sailors in their tracks in a successful attempt to arrive before they do.

While eating a hamburger, the captain finds a message which promises a $50,000 reward for the capture of a pirate submarine. The captain immediately dispatches the soldiers, but leaves Porky behind to defend the ship. Indeed, the pirate submarine targets the warship with a torpedo which stamps the warship with a target before exploding. Porky realizes and activates a cannon. The submarine mocks Porky by giving him a cigar and retrieving it with a long-distance glove projectile. The submarine's cannon is destroyed, forcing the pirate to use a slingshot and a goop projectile to destroy the warship's cannon. They shoot Porky and embark, only to be knocked out by Porky swinging on a rope. Porky uses a giant plunger to retrieve the submarine and is awarded by his superiors. Porky neglects the sack of money while running into the mess hall but later retrieves it.

== Home media ==
Porky the Gob is available on disc 3 of the Porky Pig 101 DVD set.

== See also ==
- Porky Pig filmography
- Looney Tunes and Merrie Melodies filmography (1930–1939)
