= Pied Piper Porky =

1939 film by Robert Clampett

- Title card
- Directed by: Robert Clampett
- Produced by: Leon Schlesinger
- Starring: Mel Blanc
- Music by: Carl W. Stalling
- Animation by: John Carey; Dave Hoffman
- Production company: Leon Schlesinger Productions
- Distributed by: Warner Bros. Pictures
- Release date: November 3, 1939
- Running time: 7 min
- Country: United States
- Language: English

Pied Piper Porky is a 1939 American animated comedy short film directed by Robert Clampett. The short was released on November 3, 1939. It is part of the Looney Tunes series and the 66th cartoon to feature Porky Pig.

== Plot ==
Porky Pig serves as the Pied Piper of Hamelin, who leads all but one rat to their deaths in a bid to rid the town of its rat infestation. The sole surviving rat is too smart to fall for Porky's music, and after being led to a mousetrap which he does not fall for, he destroys Porky's clarinet. Porky reluctantly uses a cat to catch the rat; the cat is scared at first, but is too self aware to let this pass. He is eventually defeated by the rat who wins in tic-tac-toe against him and tricks him into slamming into a wall. Eight of his nine lives leave, but the ninth is forced into the cat's body by Porky, who revives him with catnip, but he is unable to defeat the rat even with the strength of nine lives.

== Home media ==
The short was released on disc 4 of the Porky Pig 101 DVD set.

== See also ==
- Porky Pig filmography
- Looney Tunes and Merrie Melodies filmography (1930–1939)
