= Porky's Garden =

1937 film by Fred Avery

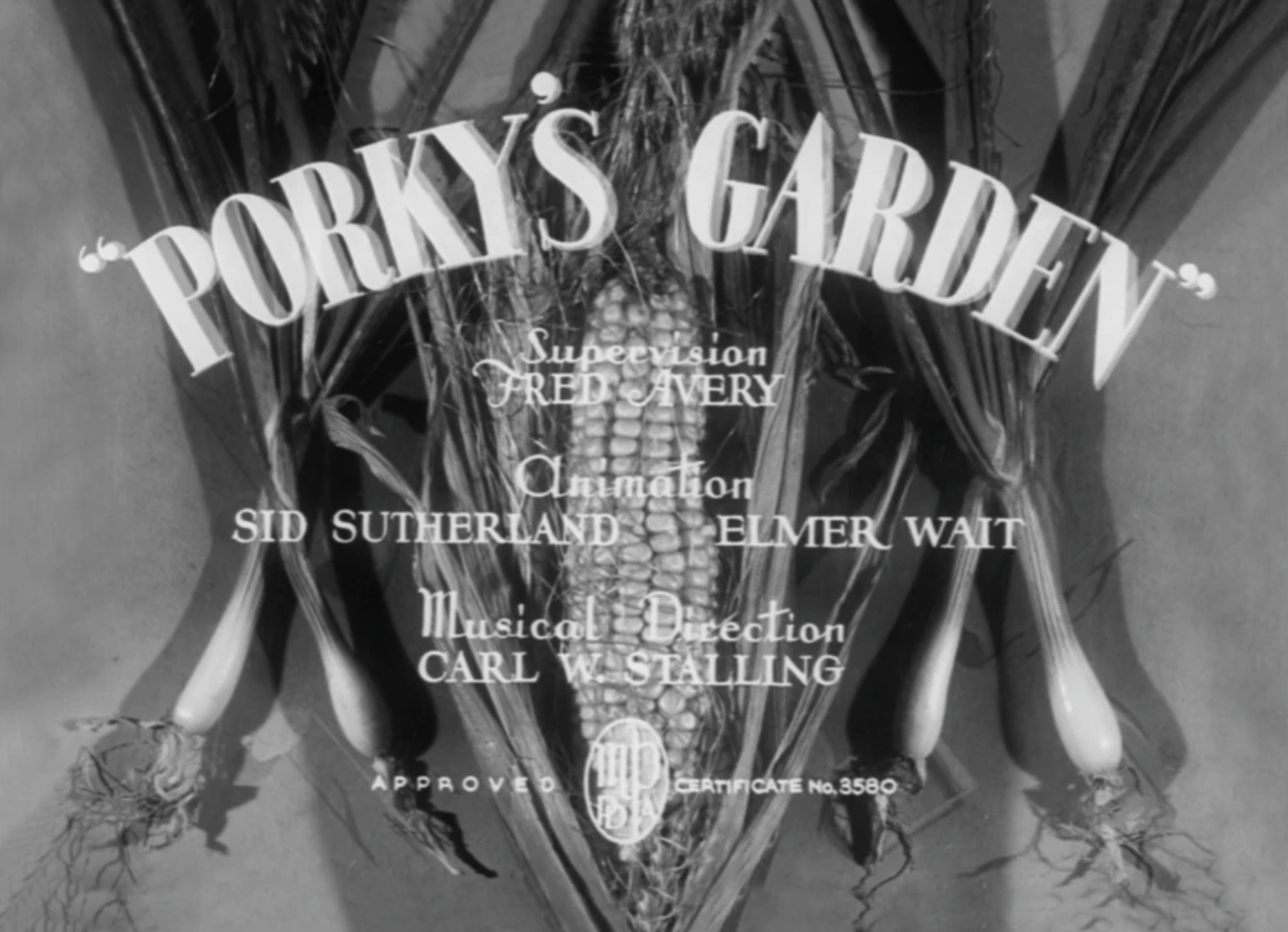
- Title card
- Directed by: Fred Avery
- Produced by: Leon Schlesinger
- Starring: Mel Blanc; Earle Hodgins; George Humbert; Shirley Reed
- Music by: Carl W. Stalling
- Animation by: Sid Sutherland; Elmer Wait
- Color process: Black-and-white
- Production company: Leon Schlesinger Productions
- Distributed by: Warner Bros. Productions; The Vitaphone Corporation
- Release date: September 11, 1937
- Running time: 7 min
- Country: United States
- Language: English

Porky's Garden is a 1937 American animated comedy short film directed by Fred Avery. The short was released on September 11, 1937. It is the 91st film in the Looney Tunes series and the 29th cartoon to feature Porky Pig. It was also the last cartoon to be animated by Elmer Wait, who was promoted to animator after Bob Clampett and Chuck Jones left Avery's unit, but died 2 months before its release.

== Plot ==
A country fair in Podunk announces a $2000 cash prize for the largest homegrown project, but the actual award is reduced to $1 after taxes. Nevertheless, Porky and his neighbor decide to compete for the prize with respectively Porky's garden and the neighbor's chicken coop. Porky plants seeds, while the neighbor mixes vitamins and minerals into the chicken feed. The chicken refuse to eat the feed due to its terrible taste. Meanwhile, Porky instantly grows his vegetables with the help of hair tonic.

The neighbor notices Porky's plants and allows his chickens to enter Porky's garden to sabotage him. A chick fights with a hen for a watermelon, only to be thrown away; he finds spinach and eats it, gaining superhuman strength and impersonating Popeye while knocking the hen away. A hen finds an apple, but only eats the worm inside.

Porky is horrified and swats the chickens with a broom to no avail. He confronts his neighbor, who feigns innocence, while happy that Porky's harvest is ruined. Porky then finds a large vine that leads to a giant pumpkin that the chickens had neglected to consume. The chickens attempt to assault him and eat the pumpkin in the manner of a football game, but Porky pushes past them and manages to catch the pumpkin after slipping, before running off to the country fair. The neighbor spots a salesman promoting reducing pills that transform an elephant into a mouse, which the salesman accidentally knocks down and causes the chickens to eat them. While Porky receives first prize for arriving first, his prize money is given to his neighbor when his chickens appear to have doubled their size, only to shrink into eggs to his shock. Porky retrieves his prize money during the iris out.

== Home media ==
Porky's Garden is available on disc 2 of the Porky Pig 101 DVD set.

== See also ==
- Porky Pig filmography
- Looney Tunes and Merrie Melodies filmography (1930–1939)
- List of animated films in the public domain in the United States
