= Milk and Money =

1936 film by Fred Avery

- Title card
- Directed by: Fred Avery
- Produced by: Leon Schlesinger
- Starring: Joe Dougherty; Billy Bletcher
- Music by: Carl W. Stalling
- Animation by: Charles Jones; Virgil Ross
- Color process: Black-and-white
- Production company: Leon Schlesinger Productions
- Distributed by: Warner Bros. Productions; The Vitaphone Corporation
- Release date: October 3, 1936
- Running time: 8 mins
- Country: United States
- Language: English

Milk and Money is a 1936 American animated comedy short film directed by Fred Avery. The short was released on October 3, 1936. It is the 76th film in the Looney Tunes series and the fourteenth cartoon to feature Porky Pig.

== Plot ==
Phineas Pig is busy with hoeing while his son Porky is ploughing the fields with his horse Dobbin. Hank Horsefly speeds up the process by stinging the horse and causing it to plow at super speed, to Phineas' surprise. To their horror, their landlord Mr. Viper, threatens to evict them if they do not pay rent by tomorrow. Porky agrees to find a job while Phineas despairs.

Porky applies for a job as a driving milkman with a strict condition not to break a single bottle. Meanwhile, Hank realizes that Dobbin is out of town, motivating him to follow suit. Porky delivers milk while unbeknownst to him, cats drink the milk he had delivered. Hank Horsefly identifies Dobbin and stings him, causing him to go fast and crash, destroying the bottles.

As Porky despairs, Dobbin eats a bucket of oats out of hunger and accidentally enters a horse race which awards $10,000 to the winner. When the race starts, Dobbin does not run while his competitors finish numerous laps. Hank realizes the situation's brevity and stings Dobbin, causing him to overtake every racer and wins the grand prize. Porky makes it to the farm in the nick of time, riding in a roofless limousine with Dobbin; Hank is given a seat as thanks. As he pays a small fraction of the owed money to Mr. Viper as rent, Hank stings Mr. Viper, who is then launched into the air and trapped in the ending title card by Porky.

== Home media ==
DVD:

- Looney Tunes Golden Collection: Volume 5
- Porky Pig 101

== See also ==
- Porky Pig filmography
- Looney Tunes and Merrie Melodies filmography (1930–1939)
