= Meet John Doughboy =

1941 film by Robert Clampett

- Title card
- Directed by: Robert Clampett
- Story by: Warren Foster
- Produced by: Leon Schlesinger
- Starring: Mel Blanc
- Narrated by: Robert C. Bruce
- Music by: Carl W. Stalling
- Animation by: Vive Risto
- Color process: Black-and-white
- Production company: Leon Schlesinger Productions
- Distributed by: Warner Bros. Pictures
- Release date: July 5, 1941
- Running time: 7 min
- Country: United States
- Language: English

Meet John Doughboy is a 1941 American animated comedy short film directed by Robert Clampett. The cartoon was released on June 21, 1941. It is part of the Looney Tunes series and the 89th cartoon to feature Porky Pig.

== Plot ==
Porky Pig the draftee presents a military-themed newsreel titled "America's Defense Effort". His film company's logo is a parody of RKO Radio Pictures.

A factory pumps out tanks simply by pouring molten metal. An aircraft factory literally hums. A Supermarine Spitfire literally spits fire. Two men, a dwarf and a man who sounds like Bugs Bunny, think they are less likely to be chosen for the draft due to their higher draft numbers, only to be both chosen. The narrator says, "An army travels on its stomach", showing soldiers literally crawling their way out of a mess hall after eating. A machine gun nest depicts a machine gun as a bird with offspring. Horses help move cannons, alongside horses raised in South America who dance on the job. A supergun fails to shoot a tank, much to the narrator's anger, as the two draftees responsible are shown loafing. The supergun is described to shoot 10 million bullets, but rests due to strain every few seconds. A "land destroyer" tested by the government is seen to be extraordinarily effective in its job, only to be revealed to be Rochester driving a car with Jack Benny in it. The President oversees a test of all weaponry. The Statue of Liberty shoots down invading planes with bug spray in a hypothetical scenario of foreign invasion.

== Home media ==
This short is available on disc 2 of the Looney Tunes Golden Collection: Volume 6 DVD set, and on disc 5 of the Porky Pig 101 DVD set.

== See also ==
- Porky Pig filmography
- Looney Tunes and Merrie Melodies filmography (1940–1949)
- List of animated films in the public domain in the United States
