= Porky the Fireman =

1938 film by Frank Tashlin

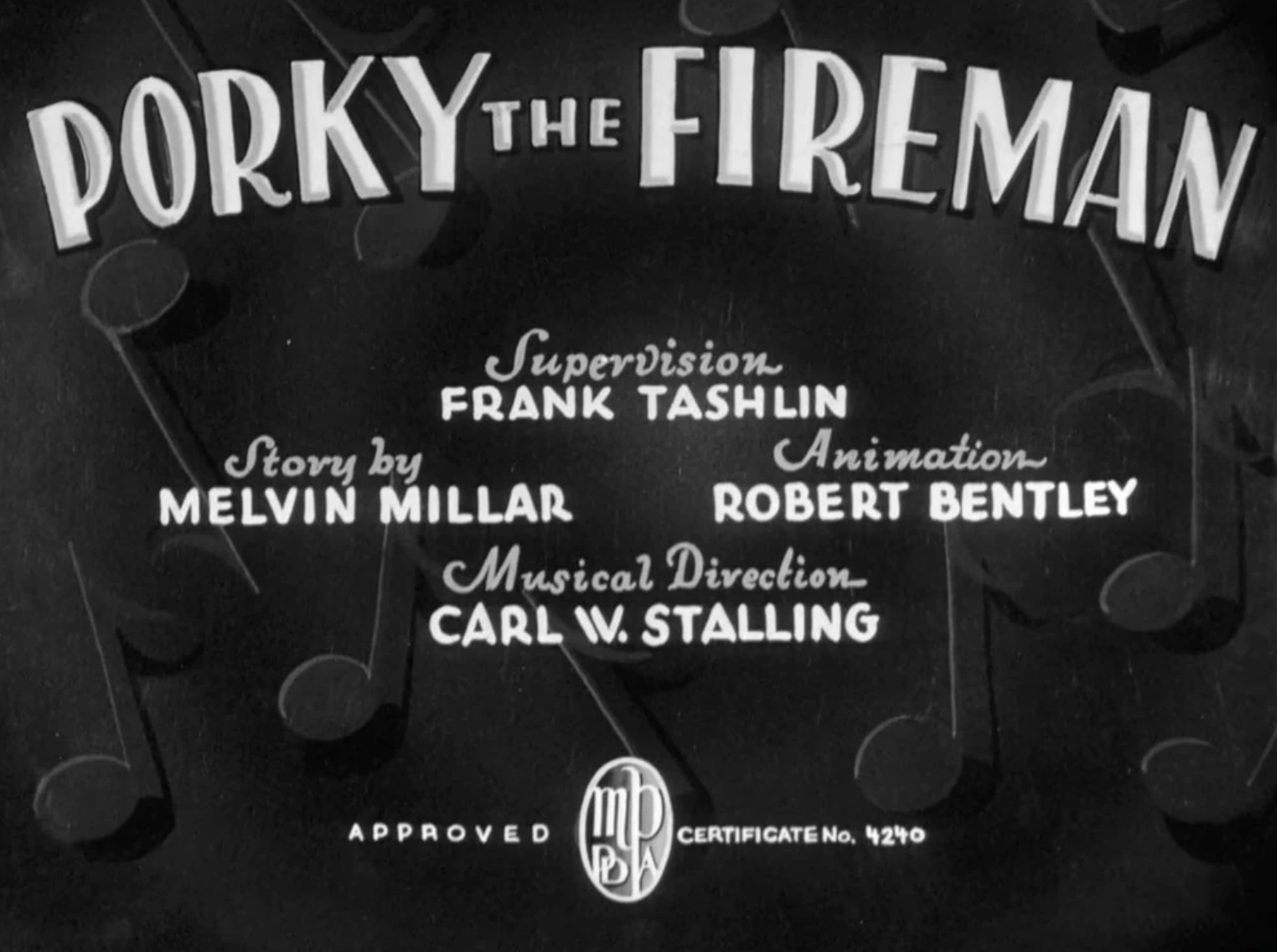
- Title card
- Directed by: Frank Tashlin
- Story by: Melvin Millar
- Produced by: Leon Schlesinger
- Starring: Mel Blanc
- Music by: Carl W. Stalling
- Animation by: Robert Bentley
- Color process: Black-and-white
- Production company: Leon Schlesinger Productions
- Distributed by: Warner Bros. Pictures; The Vitaphone Corporation
- Release date: June 4, 1938
- Running time: 6 min
- Country: United States
- Language: English

Porky the Fireman is a 1938 American animated comedy short film directed by Frank Tashlin. The short was released on June 4, 1938. It is the 103rd film in the Looney Tunes series and the 41st cartoon to feature Porky Pig.

== Plot ==
Fireman Porky Pig and his co-workers drive to extinguish a building on fire, but not before they punch their time cards. The fire is unable to be extinguished and thanks the firemen for their incompetent work. Porky is aggravated when a slow dog fireman neglects to turn on the hose, only to reveal that it contains a single drop of water. Porky fetches a bucket of water but is splashed instead by the fire.

The dog notices a fat woman who demands to be rescued. Weighing the potential costs, the dog simply drops the fat woman and allows her to fall to her death. Porky tries to rescue an old man who jumps on his own and uses his beard as a parachute. A fire spirit is overconfident in evading the water sprayed by the fireman and ends up extinguished.

Porky tries to connect a hose but is sprayed by the dog instead. Porky climbs on the ladder, but is send flying within the building with the ladder by a mischievous co-worker. The Flying Leroys, a troupe of actors, jump off and land successfully. A horrified man falls through soot which gives him blackface. Porky uses buckets to collect small fires and dumps them into a bowl of goldfish, who also don blackface. The fire ends up destroying most of the building. The fireman target the last fire spirit, who instead sprays them with water and does the Tarzan yell.

== Home media ==
This short was released on the Looney Tunes Golden Collection: Volume 4 DVD box set on November 14, 2006, and on the Porky Pig 101 DVD box set on September 19, 2017.

== See also ==
- Porky Pig filmography
- Looney Tunes and Merrie Melodies filmography (1930–1939)
