= Porky and Teabiscuit =

1939 film by Ben Hardaway and Cal Dalton

- Title card
- Directed by: Ben Hardaway; Cal Dalton
- Produced by: Leon Schlesinger Productions
- Starring: Mel Blanc
- Music by: Carl W. Stalling
- Animation by: Herman Cohen
- Color process: Black-and-white
- Production company: Leon Schlesinger Productions
- Distributed by: Warner Bros. Pictures
- Release date: April 22, 1939
- Running time: 7 min
- Country: United States
- Language: English

Porky and Teabiscuit is a 1939 American animated comedy short film directed by Ben Hardaway and Cal Dalton. The short was released on March 11, 1939. It is part of the Looney Tunes series and the 56th cartoon to feature Porky Pig.

== Plot ==
Phineas Pig sells grain while his son Porky dreams of riding a horse. He is playing on a makeshift horse when he is instructed to deliver grain to the horse racetrack and retrieve a $11 payment. He finishes the job when a misunderstanding with an old man leads to him accidentally spending the money on an auctioned horse named Teabiscuit. He fails to retrieve the money from the auctioneer and despairs when he notices a steeplechase with a $10,000 grand prize, which awards the winner $11.23 after the entry fee and numerous unwarranted pay cuts, a net profit for Porky.

As Porky gets dressed, Teabiscuit walks into the track to discover his unfamiliar surroundings, becoming interested with a trombone, but is scared into a mad dash by a balloon popped by a child. He somehow returns to the enclosure as the match starts. Porky is confused and is deceived by the audience about the direction, starting late with a competitor whose legs are powered like a motor. Teabiscuit runs in the correct direction and surpasses a competitor by biting his horse, then launches a barrel of water into them. Teabiscuit finds the trombone player again and stops to Porky's chagrin as the other competitors catch up. The child from earlier blows a balloon which flies into a tuba and pops, spooking Teabiscuit into crossing the finish time at the nick of time. Porky and Teabiscuit win the race and the award, but Teabiscuit is spooked by a camera. He tries playing the trombone but coughs.

== Home media ==
The short was released on disc 3 of the Looney Tunes Golden Collection: Volume 3 DVD set, and on disc 3 of the Porky Pig 101 DVD set.

== See also ==
- Porky Pig filmography
- Looney Tunes and Merrie Melodies filmography (1930–1939)
