= Porky's Hero Agency =

1937 film by Robert Clampett

- Title card
- Directed by: Robert Clampett
- Produced by: Leon Schlesinger
- Starring: Mel Blanc
- Music by: Carl W. Stalling
- Animation by: Charles Jones
- Color process: Black and white
- Production company: Leon Schlesinger Productions
- Distributed by: Warner Bros. Productions; The Vitaphone Corporation
- Release date: December 4, 1937
- Running time: 7 min
- Country: United States
- Language: English

Porky's Hero Agency is a 1937 American animated comedy short film directed by Robert Clampett. The short was released on November 13, 1937. It is the 95th film in the Looney Tunes series and the 33rd cartoon to feature Porky Pig.

== Plot ==
Porky reads about Greek mythology and is made to go to bed by his mother to his chagrin. He dreams about being a Greek hero named Porkykarkus who offers heroic services for sale at his agency. Leaving with his winged shoes, he is hired by the emperor, who wants him to defeat the Gorgon and retrieve her life-restoring needle, who had turned his committee into statues that he is forced to control like marionettes.

Porky flies to the Gorgon's statue factory, which offers to turn a person into stone for cheaper than a sculptor's services, but nevertheless claims to allow clients to be revived with a needle shall they feel dissatisfied. The Gorgon turns an old man into a $60,000 statue and the Three Stooges into a three wise monkeys statue. Porky is hauled in by a black guard. The Gorgon attempts to turn a pyramid made of Egyptians standing on each other into a literal pyramid statue, but the botched effort leads her to using the needle to revive them and try again.

It is Porky's turn, causing him to escape in fear of becoming a piggy bank, but shatters a statue of Dick Powell. He exploits the opportunity to disguise himself as Powell and snatch the life-restoring needle from the Gorgon, but the Gorgon is too smitten with the statue to stay put. The Gorgon hugs the statue and discovers Porky inside, who then snatches the needle and runs. He restores the old man, Discobolus, a Native American, Venus de Milo and a false mermaid to life, then a temple and a smaller Shirley Temple who crawl away. He is captured by the Gorgon once exhausted, only to wake up and find his mother comforting him, which he embraces.

== Home media ==
Porky's Hero Agency is available on disc 2 of the Porky Pig 101 DVD set.

== See also ==
- Porky Pig filmography
- Looney Tunes and Merrie Melodies filmography (1930–1939)
