= Porky's Phoney Express =

1938 film by Cal Howard and Cal Dalton

- Title card
- Directed by: Cal Howard; Cal Dalton
- Story by: Melvin Millar
- Produced by: Leon Schlesinger
- Starring: Mel Blanc
- Music by: Carl W. Stalling
- Animation by: Herman Cohen
- Color process: Black and white
- Production company: Leon Schlesinger Productions
- Distributed by: Warner Bros. Productions; The Vitaphone Corporation
- Release date: March 19, 1938
- Running time: 7 min
- Country: United States

Porky's Phoney Express is a 1938 American animated comedy short film directed by Cal Howard and Cal Dalton. The cartoon was released on March 19, 1938. It is the 99th film in the Looney Tunes series and the 37th cartoon to feature Porky Pig. It is the first film in the series to be directed by Howard and Dalton, who replaced Friz Freleng after his departure to Metro-Goldwyn-Mayer.

== Plot ==
Porky works at the Pony Express as a janitor who dreams of joining the Express but is repeatedly denied by the manager. A deliveryman on the way to Red Gulch returns with arrows shot by hostile Native Americans, refusing service due to risking death. He and the manager decides to mockingly let Porky deliver a bag of horseshoes intended to hinder his progress. They accidentally mix up the actual mail with the horseshoes with their chagrin, while Porky rides away with the actual mail.

Porky is spotted by the Native Americans. He tries to shoot them with his revolver, only for the recoil to throw him off repeatedly. A Native American rides a bicycle and uses it to grind a throwing axe, which destroys the bag of mail as Porky retrieves them with a net. He successfully arrives at Red Gulch and delivers the mail to the cheers of the populace, who had not received mail in months due to the Native Americans. Porky is promoted to manager at his town while the original manager is demoted to janitor as punishment.

== Home media ==
Porky's Phoney Express is available on disc 2 of the Porky Pig 101 DVD set.

== See also ==
- Porky Pig filmography
- Looney Tunes and Merrie Melodies filmography (1930–1939)
