= Porky's Baseball Broadcast =

1940 film by Isadore Freleng

- Title card
- Directed by: I. Freleng
- Story by: J. B. Hardaway
- Produced by: Leon Schlesinger
- Starring: Mel Blanc
- Music by: Carl W. Stalling
- Animation by: Cal Dalton
- Color process: Black and white
- Production company: Leon Schlesinger Productions
- Distributed by: Warner Bros. Pictures
- Release date: July 6, 1940
- Running time: 7 min
- Country: United States
- Language: English

Porky's Baseball Broadcast is a 1940 American animated comedy short film directed by Isadore Freleng. The cartoon was released on July 6, 1940. It is part of the Looney Tunes series and the 76th cartoon to feature Porky Pig.

== Plot ==
Porky Pig hosts a live radio broadcast of a baseball game between the Giants and the Red Sox. Tickets are baked by a chef at the reception desk. Scalpers depicted as Native Americans attack a patron. Throughout the film, a patron resembling Droopy fails to find his seat and inconveniences other patrons.

The Giants have a pitcher who is a literal giant, while the opposing team has a double header who are conjoined twins. The umpire happens to be a blind dog. A caricature of Carl Hubbell throws the first pitch as the match starts. A bat boy, literally depicted as a bat, does his job. A pitcher struggles with his extremely baggy clothes and dies after a ball explodes. A pig caricature of Babe Ruth scores a point. The Giants' giant pitcher help them win the match. The Droopy-like patron finally finds his seat by the fourth quarter, but his view is blocked by a pole. He accepts his fate until he overstays until night and destroys the stadium in anger.

== Home media ==
- DVD: Porky Pig 101 (B&W, uncut)

== See also ==
- Porky Pig filmography
- Looney Tunes and Merrie Melodies filmography (1940–1949)
