= It's an Ill Wind =

1939 film by Ben Hardaway and Cal Dalton

- Title card
- Directed by: Ben Hardaway; Cal Dalton
- Story by: Melvin Millar
- Produced by: Leon Schlesinger
- Starring: Mel Blanc
- Music by: Carl W. Stalling
- Animation by: Herman Cohen
- Color process: Black and white
- Production company: Leon Schlesinger Productions
- Distributed by: Warner Bros. Pictures; The Vitaphone Corporation
- Release date: January 28, 1939
- Running time: 7 min
- Country: United States
- Language: English

It's an Ill Wind is a 1939 American animated comedy short film directed by Ben Hardaway and Cal Dalton. The cartoon was released on January 28, 1939. It is part of the Looney Tunes series and the 52nd cartoon to feature Porky Pig.

== Plot ==
Porky Pig goes fishing with Dizzy Duck, who refuses to shut up until Porky's dog brings them a rotten fish bone, much to Porky's chagrin. A storm leads to Porky dragging a reluctant Dizzy to cover, only to be locked in a dark house by an ominous offscreen figure. They go outside and are horrified by a stick covered by clothes. Porky accidentally hooks his clothes on his fishing hook, causing him to be thrown while Dizzy reels him in. As Porky unhooks his clothes, Dizzy hooks a bearskin carpet, which they mistake as a live bear and escape for their lives.

Porky's dog gets his head stuck in a diving helmet after angering a turtle and tries to get it loose, leading to his tail being pulled by a mousetrap and landing on chains. He finds Dizzy, who is equally horrified and hides in barrels. When they find each other, Dizzy accidentally hooks his tail on an umbrella and opens a door, only for the wind to blow him into the sky. He falls into a portrait of Napoleon when lightning fries the umbrella. Porky is burned by a candle on a turtle's shell, causing him to fall into the water, holding onto rope while Dizzy tries to rescue him. Dizzy trips on oil and almost loses the rope until the last second, while Porky has fallen into the water and climbs to the surface offscreen. They are sent flying out of the house by the dog and are relieved, only for the dog to reenter the house and slap the turtle from earlier.

== Home media ==
It's an Ill Wind is available on disc 3 of the Porky Pig 101 DVD set.

== See also ==
- Porky Pig filmography
- Looney Tunes and Merrie Melodies filmography (1930–1939)
