= Volney White =

American animator and director

Volney White (20 May 1907 – 23 December 1966) was an American animator and director active in the late 1930s and early 1940s. He worked at Romer Grey Pictures, Ltd which was launched in the spring of 1930, in Altadena, California, just north of Pasadena as studio supervisor.

He went on to work with Norman McCabe at Warner Bros. Cartoons where he animated several classic black and white Looney Tunes cartoons.

Animation Department:

- A-Lad-In Bagdad (1938) (animator)
- Porky's Hare Hunt (1938) (animator)
- Porky at the Crocadero (1938) (animator)
- The Case of the Stuttering Pig (1937) (animator)
- Speaking of the Weather (1937) (animator)
- Porky's Building (1937) (animator)
- Porky in the North Woods (1936) (animator)
- Porky's Poultry Plant (1936) (animator)

As Director:

- When Knights Were Bold (1941)
- Hairless Hector (1941)
- The Magic Pencil (1940)
- Touchdown Demons (1940)
- Love in a Cottage (1940)
- Rover's Rescue (1940)
- Wots All th' Shootin' fer? (1940)
