= Porky's Tire Trouble =

1939 film by Robert Clampett

- Title card
- Directed by: Robert Clampett
- Story by: Warren Foster
- Produced by: Leon Schlesinger
- Starring: Mel Blanc
- Music by: Carl W. Stalling
- Animation by: Norman McCabe
- Color process: Black and white
- Production company: Leon Schlesinger Productions
- Distributed by: Warner Bros. Pictures; The Vitaphone Corporation
- Release date: February 18, 1939
- Running time: 7 min
- Country: United States

Porky's Tire Trouble is a 1939 American animated comedy short film directed by Robert Clampett. The cartoon was released on February 18, 1939. It is part of the Looney Tunes series and the 53rd cartoon to feature Porky Pig.

== Plot ==
Porky Pig is followed by his dog to his workplace the Snappy Rubber Company, where he turns rubber tree bark into tires. He ties the dog to a nearby car, which fails spectacularly as the dog digs into the factory with car in tow, running over Porky. The dog falls into "rubberizing solution", which makes his movements bouncy and uncontrollable, but he realizes that he can contort his face into that of celebrities, including Clark Gable.

The dog falls into a jar with a funnel which he jams his head in, then crawls into some stairs which shapes his body the same way and trips Porky's boss. This earns the wrath of Porky's boss, who dislikes dogs and hence banned dogs from entering in the first place. He catches the dog's tail, but the dog stretches around the room to behind him and bites him. He repeatedly throws the dog out of the factory to no avail, as the dog returns to hit him multiple times, even after he gently lets him out in a vain attempt to prevent this. Porky's boss is thrown to the tire-making machine, with his body fashioned into a tire to his horror.

== Home media ==
Porky's Tire Trouble is available on disc 3 of the Porky Pig 101 DVD set.

== See also ==
- Porky Pig filmography
- Looney Tunes and Merrie Melodies filmography (1930–1939)
