= Slap Happy Pappy =

1940 film by Robert Clampett

- Title card
- Directed by: Robert Clampett
- Story by: Warren Foster
- Produced by: Leon Schlesinger
- Starring: Mel Blanc; Jack Lescoulie; Cliff Nazarro; Danny Webb; Kay Kyser
- Music by: Carl W. Stalling
- Animation by: John Carey; Isadore Ellis
- Color process: Black-and-white
- Production company: Leon Schlesinger Productions
- Distributed by: Warner Bros. Pictures
- Release date: April 13, 1940
- Running time: 6 min
- Country: United States
- Language: English

Slap Happy Pappy is a 1940 American animated comedy short film directed by Robert Clampett. It is part of the Looney Tunes series and the 73rd cartoon to feature Porky Pig.

== Plot ==
Porky owns a farm. The cartoon starts with him plowing the fields. But the bulk of the cartoon is about the poultry farm. A sign reads, "Miracle Eggs for sale, if it's a good egg it's a miracle egg". A rabbit impersonating Jack Benny (Jack Bunny) is making Easter eggs and looking at them. He is about to smash a black egg, but it breaks and a black bird emerges (doing an impersonation of Rochester).

The scene then cuts to Eddie Cackler (based on Eddie Cantor) and his wife. The family wants a son, but is having no luck. Five eggs hatch and not a single one of them is a boy. A Bing Crosby lookalike happens to be near by holding a stroller that has babies all of which are boys. The father asks him what his secret is, and he croons to a black hen who then lays dozen of eggs, all of whom are boys.

Eddie tries the same thing to his wife, and she lays an egg, labeled "JR." (junior). The two are dancing when Eddie asks if the baby could really be a boy. He then says, shrugging, "Mmmm, could be!"

== Home media ==
- DVD: Porky Pig 101

== See also ==
- Porky Pig filmography
- Looney Tunes and Merrie Melodies filmography (1940–1949)
