= Porky's Moving Day =

1936 film by Jack King

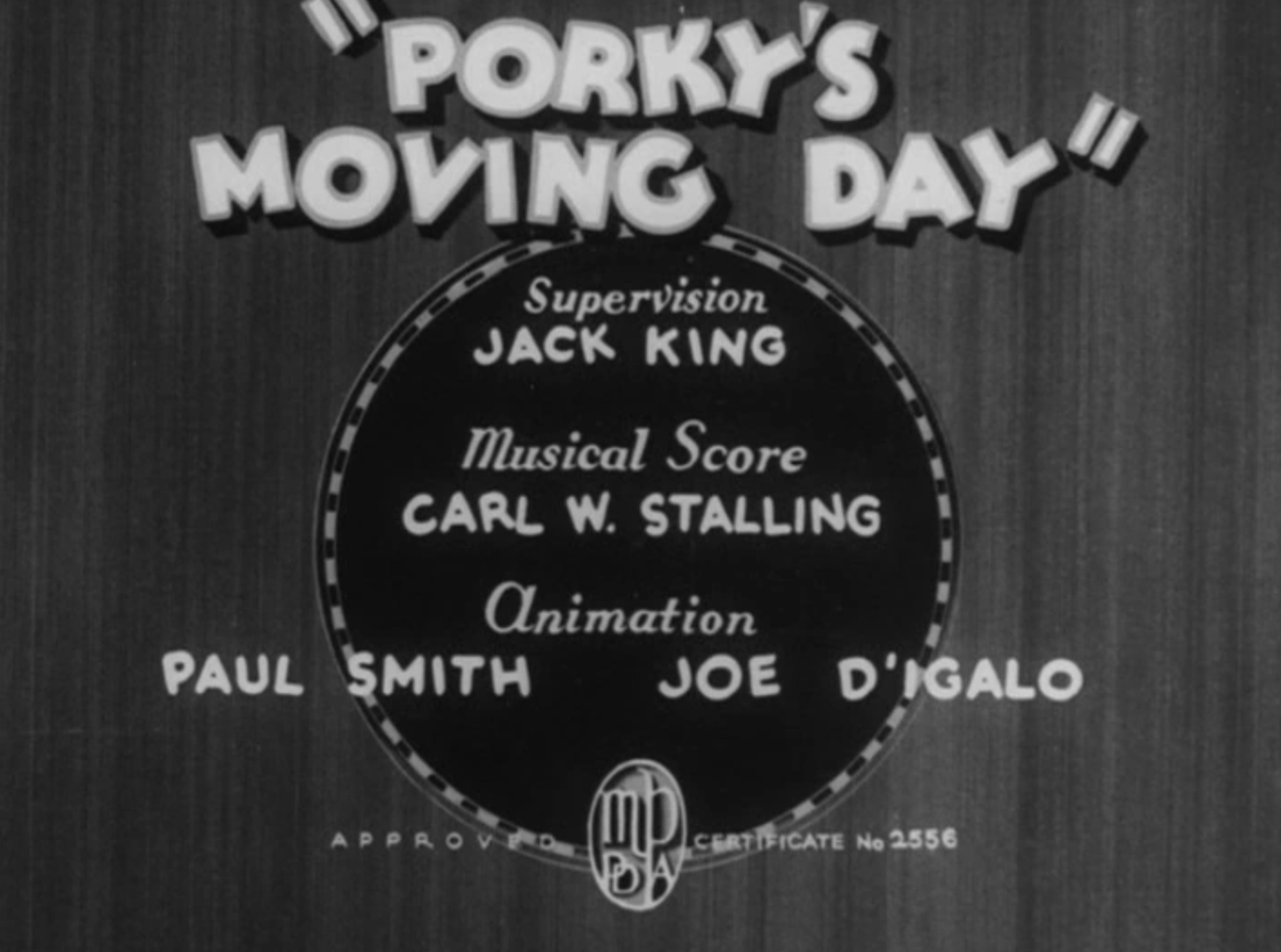
- Title card
- Directed by: Jack King
- Produced by: Leon Schlesinger
- Music by: Carl W. Stalling
- Animation by: Paul Smith; Joe D'Igalo
- Color process: Black and white
- Production company: Leon Schlesinger Productions
- Distributed by: Warner Bros. Productions; The Vitaphone Corporation
- Release date: September 12, 1936
- Running time: 7 min
- Country: United States
- Language: English

Porky's Moving Day is a 1936 American animated comedy short film directed by Jack King. The short was released on September 13, 1936. It is the 75th film in the Looney Tunes series, the thirteenth cartoon to feature Porky Pig and the final film in the series to be directed by Jack King, who returned to Walt Disney Productions before its release and was replaced by Frank Tash.

== Plot ==
Porky Pig operates a moving van. He and his co-worker Dopey, a stereotypical African-American man, sleep while elsewhere, a woman struggles to live in her flimsily built cliffside house, which risks being knocked into the ocean by the waves, motivating her to call Porky. A running gag involves Dopey confusing bell sounds with that of a boxing match and trying to fight, only to be hit by a mallet in some way and stop. Porky answers the phone. He drives to the house with Lulu the ostrich carrying the van.

Porky arrives at the spot and Dopey accidentally knocks out the homeowner. Porky throws a multitude of objects out of the house, including a piano which collapses a section of the ground despite a mattress being used for safety. Porky rides a scooter to carry it out while he notifies Dopey to hurry up. Dopey carries the entire chimney and fireplace without issue. Porky tries to quickly roll a very long carpet, only for Lulu to be in the way, and he crashes onto a wall which reverses the process. Dopey accidentally drops tables which serve as convenient stairs, while Lulu eating an alarm clock causes him to drop and shatter numerous tableware. Porky tries to bring a table through a door, only to be stuck; Dopey is thrown backward by a stuck seam and launches Porky out of the window, only keeping his footing by the steam from a boat. Fortunately, a large wave sweeps everything into the van, reducing the amount of work needed.

== Home media ==
Porky's Moving Day is available on disc 1 of the Porky Pig 101 DVD set.

== See also ==
- Porky Pig filmography
- Looney Tunes and Merrie Melodies filmography (1930–1939)
