= Pilgrim Porky =

1940 film by Robert Clampett

- Title card
- Directed by: Robert Clampett
- Story by: Warren Foster
- Produced by: Leon Schlesinger
- Starring: Mel Blanc
- Music by: Carl W. Stalling
- Animation by: Norman McCabe
- Color process: Black-and-white
- Production company: Leon Schlesinger Productions
- Distributed by: Warner Bros. Pictures
- Release date: March 16, 1940
- Running time: 7 min
- Country: United States
- Language: English

Pilgrim Porky is a 1940 American animated comedy short film directed by Robert Clampett. The short was released on February 10, 1940. It is part of the Looney Tunes series and the 72nd cartoon to feature Porky Pig.

== Plot ==
In 1620, Porky leads the Pilgrims on the Mayflower in its journey from England to the New World. The Pilgrims sing joyfully while simultaneously suffering from seasickness. A sailor is washed into the sea and replaced by a sea lion. Porky records the journey on his captain's log. Throughout the film, a stereotypical African chef catches a fish in the sea by literally diving into the water, which the narrator regards to be too small. Porky spots flying fish who literally fly airplanes.

A storm occurs, only for the lightning to cut a cloud resembling roast chicken. The narrator holds up a sign saying The Rains Came. The ship almost crashes into an iceberg, only for it to split in half as the ship passes by. By recognizing nearby trash, Porky realizes that the ship has arrived at Plymouth Rock, where an infantile Statue of Liberty stands. Porky is welcomed by chief Sitting Bull, who is seemingly stern but is revealed to be goofier than he looks. The chef from earlier finally "catches" a fish by being swallowed by a fish large enough to impress the narrator.

== Home media ==
DVD:

- Looney Tunes Golden Collection: Volume 5
- Porky Pig 101

== See also ==
- Porky Pig filmography
- Looney Tunes and Merrie Melodies filmography (1940–1949)
