= Ali-Baba Bound =

1940 film by Robert Clampett

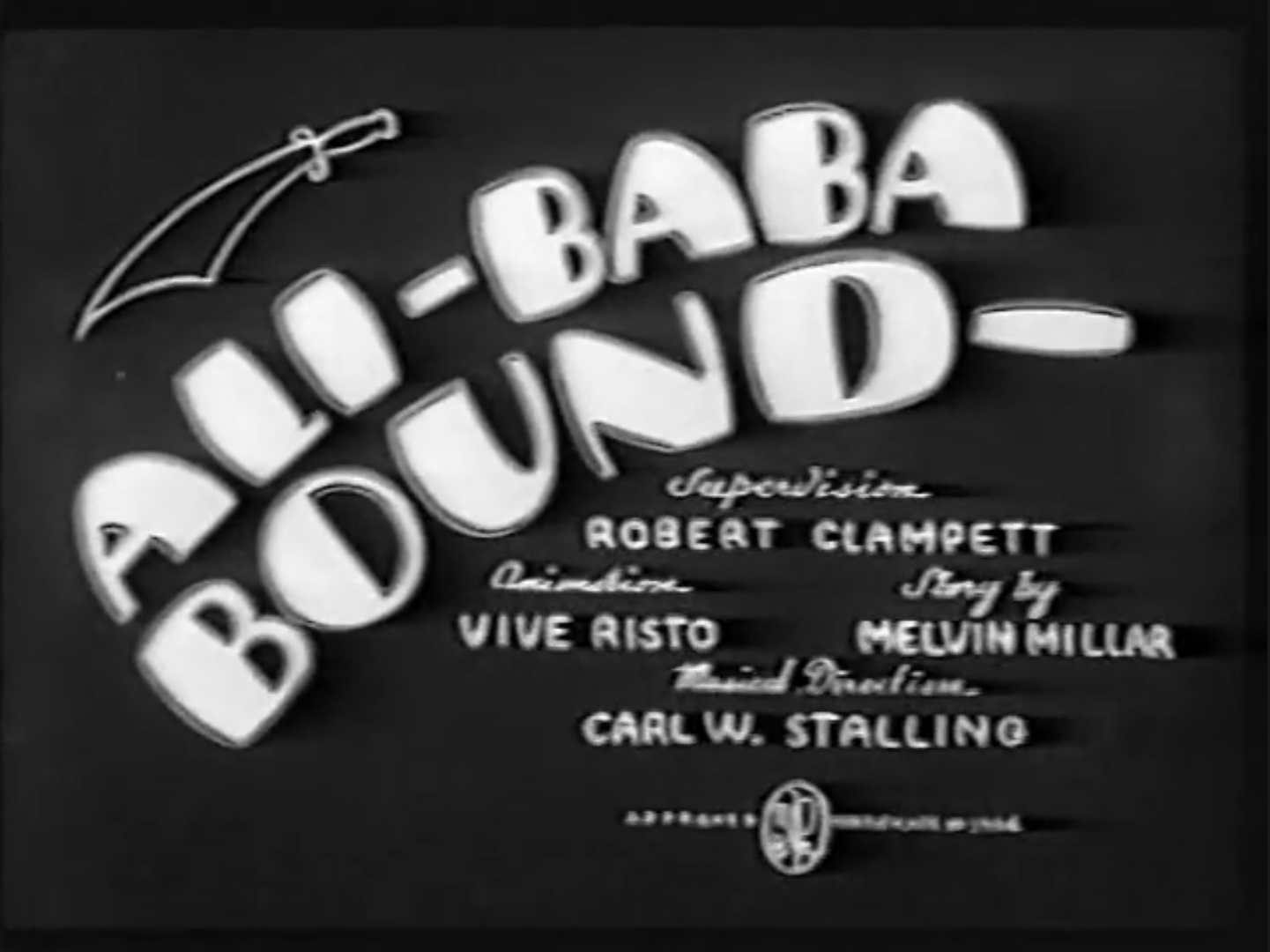
- Title card
- Directed by: Robert Clampett
- Story by: Melvin Millar
- Produced by: Leon Schlesinger
- Starring: Mel Blanc
- Music by: Carl W. Stalling
- Animation by: Vive Risto
- Color process: Black-and-white
- Production company: Leon Schlesinger Productions
- Distributed by: Warner Bros. Pictures
- Release date: February 10, 1940
- Running time: 7 min
- Country: United States
- Language: English

Ali-Baba Bound is a 1940 American animated comedy short film directed by Robert Clampett. The short was released on February 10, 1940. It is part of the Looney Tunes series and the 71st cartoon to feature Porky Pig. It is in the public domain as Warner Bros. Pictures neglected to renew its copyright on time.

The title is a spoof of the song "I'm Alabama Bound".

== Plot ==
In the Sahara Desert, where it is so hot even the fan dancers use electric fans, Porky Pig is in the French Foreign Legion. While leaving a restaurant he gets a secret message labelled Confessions of a Nasty Spy from a caricature of George Raft as a spy named Tattle Tale Gray that Ali Baba and his militants are going to attack a Beau Geste type desert fort. Porky rents Baby Dumpling the camel then races off in order to get to the fort.

Porky finds out that the Legionnaires have gone to the Legion convention in Boston. Ali Baba then launches a sneak attack on Porky, who barely escapes into the fort. As he attempts to shoot Ali Baba and his goons, they retaliate in amusing ways such as using a militant to pound the door while feeding him pills, as well as using a high striker to reach Porky. Baby Dumpling calls for help after avoiding a stabbing, which his mother obliges by getting a fill-up and running to the fort. She saves Porky and Baby Dumpling from being stabbed by Ali Baba. A suicide bomber attempts to bomb the fort, but the camels opens the door that leads him outside, where he accidentally bombs and kills Ali Baba and the other militants in the process; their clothes are converted into an auto camp.

== Home media ==
- DVD: Porky Pig 101 (B&W, uncut)

== See also ==
- Looney Tunes and Merrie Melodies filmography (1940–1949)
- Porky Pig filmography
- List of animated films in the public domain in the United States
