= Porky's Prize Pony =

1941 film by Charles M. Jones

- Title card
- Directed by: Charles M. Jones
- Story by: Rich Hogan
- Produced by: Leon Schlesinger
- Starring: Mel Blanc
- Music by: Carl W. Stalling
- Animation by: Ken Harris
- Color process: Black-and-white
- Production company: Leon Schlesinger Productions
- Distributed by: Warner Bros. Pictures
- Release date: June 21, 1941
- Running time: 7 min
- Country: United States
- Language: English

Porky's Prize Pony is a 1941 American animated comedy short film directed by Charles M. Jones. The cartoon was released on June 21, 1941. It is part of the Looney Tunes series and the 88th cartoon to feature Porky Pig.

== Plot ==
A horse is kicked out from an elite stable. Nearby, Porky prepares his elite horse for a steeplechase when he sees the abandoned horse desperately trying to be adopted. He constantly annoys Porky with signs, tries to help him carry water and jumps an incredibly far distance to no avail. He gets his hoofs stuck in a bucket, causing him to hop and hit Porky's stable, causing the elite horse to accidentally drink liniment containing 125% alcohol.

On the day of the steeplechase, Porky is shocked to find the elite horse drunk and unconscious. The abandoned horse exploits the opportunity to race in the elite horse's place. The abandoned horse proves to be competent in steeplechasing, but his lack of knowledge of the rules either cause him to hinder his opponents' progress or take the lead due to the racetrack's poor design hiding shortcuts. The horse gets his legs stuck in the trophy, much to his chagrin.

== Home media ==
This short is available on disc 5 of the Porky Pig 101 DVD set.

== See also ==
- Porky Pig filmography
- Looney Tunes and Merrie Melodies filmography (1940–1949)
- List of animated films in the public domain in the United States
