= Jeepers Creepers (1939 animated film) =

1939 film by Robert Clampett

- Title card
- Directed by: Robert Clampett
- Story by: Ernest Gee
- Produced by: Leon Schlesinger
- Starring: Mel Blanc
- Music by: Carl W. Stalling
- Animation by: Vive Risto
- Color process: Black-and-white
- Production company: Leon Schlesinger Productions
- Distributed by: Warner Bros. Pictures
- Release date: September 22, 1939
- Running time: 8 min
- Country: United States
- Language: English

Jeepers Creepers is a 1939 American animated comedy short film directed by Robert Clampett. The short was released as early as September 22, 1939. It is part of the Looney Tunes series and the 64th cartoon to feature Porky Pig.

== Plot ==
Porky is a police officer, who is in a police car that is named 6 7/8. He gets a call from his chief to go investigate strange noises at a haunted house. It is revealed that said noises are merely from a radio program listened by a ghost. The ghost walks around and takes a bath in a wringer washer after the program ends.

The ghost hears Porky's presence and coerces him to enter before disappearing. He places frogs in shoes to imitate self-walking shoes and scare Porky; the shoes hit a coat hanger and a curtain to resemble a cloaked individual. As Porky is startled by the ghost hitting a platter over his head, he is scared by the coat hanger into running into the ghost. The ghost chases him into other rooms then out of the house, where the ghost is defeated by failing to hitchhike and blasted by exhaust fumes into wearing blackface.

== Reception ==
Showmen's Trade Review called the short "an unpretentious cartoon that is good for seven minutes of enjoyment... On the whole it will make a welcome addition to any program."

The Film Daily wrote, "Although this type of material has been done so often in animated subjects, Jeepers Creepers carries enough humor to make it worth while for cartoon devotees, and particularly the younger generation of pix-goers."

== Cast ==
- Mel Blanc – Porky Pig / Ghost and Making Faces / Falsetto (uncredited)
- Pinto Colvig – one line of Ghost (uncredited)

== Home media ==
Jeepers Creepers is available on disc 4 of the Porky Pig 101 DVD set.

== See also ==
- Porky Pig filmography
- Looney Tunes and Merrie Melodies filmography (1930–1939)
