= Porky's Spring Planting =

1938 film by Frank Tashlin

- Directed by: Frank Tashlin
- Story by: George Manuell
- Produced by: Leon Schlesinger
- Starring: Mel Blanc
- Music by: Carl W. Stalling
- Animation by: Joe D'Igalo
- Color process: Black-and-white
- Production company: Leon Schlesinger Productions
- Distributed by: Warner Bros. Pictures; The Vitaphone Corporation
- Release date: July 25, 1938
- Running time: 7 min
- Country: United States
- Language: English

Porky's Spring Planting is a 1938 American animated comedy short film directed by Frank Tashlin. The short was released on July 25, 1938. It is part of the Looney Tunes series and the 43rd cartoon to feature Porky Pig.

== Plot ==
Porky Pig ploughs his land and finds a bone, which is given to his dog Streamline and stored in his secret bone safe. He uses plungers to forcefully grow flowers and irrigates them, which they react with embarrassment and hide behind a curtain. Streamline helps plant seeds while Porky mixes various vegetable seeds and plants them as "combination salad".

As Porky and Streamline leave, a rooster exploits the open garden to monetize it and feed its peers. Some hens even avoid paying by eating on the field themselves, causing Porky to notice and attempt to swat them away. He constructs a primitive scarecrow which is wholly ineffective, as the rooster steals its shirt and hat. Streamline tries to chase the chickens but is beat up instead. Porky negotiates with the chickens and agrees to plant a separate field with only corn to appease their demands, under the condition that they do not touch his crops.

== Home media ==
Porky's Spring Planting is available on disc 3 of the Porky Pig 101 DVD set.

== See also ==
- Porky Pig filmography
- Looney Tunes and Merrie Melodies filmography (1930–1939)
