= Calling Dr. Porky =

1940 film by Isadore Freleng

- Title card
- Directed by: I. Freleng
- Story by: Jack Miller
- Produced by: Leon Schlesinger
- Starring: Mel Blanc
- Music by: Carl W. Stalling
- Animation by: Herman Cohen
- Color process: Black-and-white
- Production company: Leon Schlesinger Productions
- Distributed by: Warner Bros. Pictures
- Release date: September 21, 1940
- Running time: 7 min
- Country: United States
- Language: English

Calling Dr. Porky is a 1940 American animated comedy short film directed by Isadore Freleng. It was released on September 21, 1940. It is part of the Looney Tunes and the 78th cartoon to feature Porky Pig.

== Plot ==
At New Rightus Hospital, patients are stored in cramped cabinets behind the reception table. A dog experiencing a hangover seeks assistance and is directed to a doctor, only to be scared by three pink elephants from his hallucinations. He arrives at Dr. Porky's room just as Porky prescribes medication to a bear with a spinning head. As Porky walks away for a moment, the elephants return to torment him with Porky's gear to no avail. They devise a plan to torture the dog by questioning and mocking him. Porky finally ends the commotion by giving him medication that improves his symptoms, which cause the elephants to disappear. He leaves the hospital but is met with the pink elephants trailing actual appearances, which render both him and the pink elephants horrified for finding each other.

== Home media ==
- DVD: Porky Pig 101 (B&W, uncut)

== See also ==
- Porky Pig filmography
- Looney Tunes and Merrie Melodies filmography (1940–1949)
