= Shanghaied Shipmates =

1936 film by Jack King

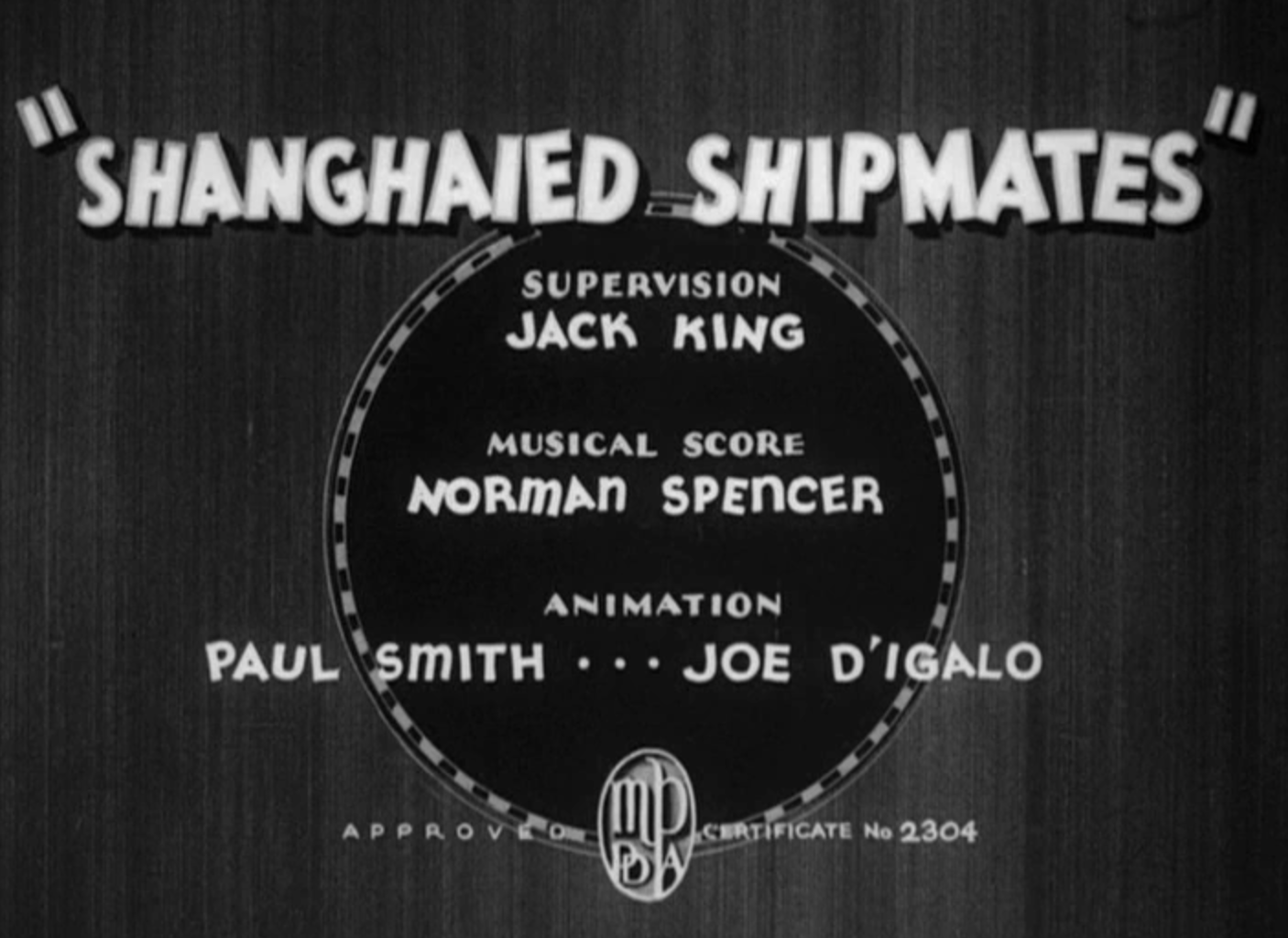
- Title card
- Directed by: Jack King
- Produced by: Leon Schlesinger
- Starring: Joe Dougherty
- Music by: Norman Spencer
- Animation by: Paul Smith; Joe D'Igalo
- Color process: Black-and-white
- Production company: Leon Schlesinger Productions
- Distributed by: Warner Bros. Productions; The Vitaphone Corporation
- Release date: June 20, 1936
- Running time: 7 min
- Country: United States
- Language: English

Shanghaied Shipmates is a 1936 American animated comedy short film directed by Jack King. The short was released on June 20, 1936. It is the 71st film in the Looney Tunes series and the ninth cartoon to feature Porky Pig.

== Plot ==
At a seaside tavern, Porky Pig dances to piano music played by his fellow sailors while they drink alcohol. Meanwhile, a bulldog pirate captain is angered that his crew has left him, except for a short stereotypical Asian sailor who remains faithful to him.

The pirate arrives at the tavern and abducts everyone in it to work for him, including Porky, who is forced to clean the ship's floor. Porky sends a piece of soap towards the pirate's direction, causing him to slip; he chokes Porky with the soap. As Porky burps soap bubbles, one of his friends releases the soap from his body with his tail, causing the pirate to slip on it again. The pirate forces a hippo to have its toes licked by a cat, while another sailor is made to mop the floor with his peg leg.

It is lunch time and the sailors run over a tuba player to the mess hall. The pirate eats a large amount of chicken legs and gives the bones to his crew, which they throw away, or in Porky's case, sprinkle salt on and lick. A week later, they revolt while the stereotypical Asian tells on them. They jump the captain while Porky fights the stereotypical Asian. The pirate tries to retaliate with a cannon, which instead pulls him backward and up into a pile of TNT. With his ship gone, he is forced to swim Porky and his friends to shore on a raft while they rejoice.

== Home media ==
Shanghaied Shipmates is available on disc 1 of the Porky Pig 101 DVD set.

== See also ==
- Porky Pig filmography
- Looney Tunes and Merrie Melodies filmography (1930–1939)
