= Porky Pig 101 =

2017 box set of animated short films

- DVD cover
- Directed by: Friz Freleng, Tex Avery, Jack King, Frank Tashlin, Ub Iwerks, Bob Clampett, Chuck Jones, Norman McCabe
- Produced by: Leon Schlesinger
- Starring: Joe Dougherty, Mel Blanc
- Music by: Bernard Brown, Norman Spencer, Carl Stalling
- Distributed by: Warner Home Video
- Release date: September 19, 2017
- Running time: 743 minutes
- Country: United States
- Language: English

Porky Pig 101 is a DVD box-set released by Warner Archive Collection on September 19, 2017, collecting the first 101 animated short subjects starring Porky Pig. The set features all 99 Porky Pig Looney Tunes cartoons made in black and white, as well as two Merrie Melodies cartoons made in color: Porky's debut appearance in I Haven't Got a Hat (1935) and the color "special" Old Glory (1939).

This is the first Looney Tunes DVD collection produced by the Warner Archive boutique label, as opposed to the main Warner Home Video "family division", which had handled previous Looney Tunes DVD and Blu-ray releases such as the Looney Tunes Golden Collection, Platinum Collection and Super Stars sets. According to Jerry Beck, after several years of both him and Warner Archive president George Feltenstein lobbying, the "family unit" relinquished the distribution of the black-and-white Porky Pig cartoons to Warner Archive since they believed children were uninterested in black-and-white cartoons.

Of the 101 cartoons included, 38 of them were previously restored for the aforementioned Golden and Platinum collections and The Essential Daffy Duck, with 37 of them being ported over to this set and one (Patient Porky) being an unrestored vault print; the other 63 are unrestored and previously unreleased on home media, including films that would otherwise not be acknowledged and released in other best-of collections. All shorts are presented uncut with all 99 black-and-white cartoons shown in their original format - as opposed to the various redrawn and computer colorized versions that commonly aired on television. The set has no new special features - but the set does include audio commentaries and other supplements from the previous Golden and Platinum releases.

According to Beck, production on the set started in 2012, and since this was Warner Archive's first Golden Age of Animation release, the restoration team was given a very limited budget. Therefore, unlike the Golden Collection and Platinum Collection series, they were unable to digitally restore the 63 new-to-DVD shorts from the original camera negatives, and instead had to simply remaster them from high quality 35mm black-and-white "vault prints". This resulted in several shorts having some minor errors including incorrect opening and closing themes (see below).

Porky Pig 101 received mixed reviews from animation fans and collectors, who tended to praise the complete and chronological nature of the set - featuring rare never before released shorts, and presenting them uncut and in their original black-and-white format - but also criticized the restoration quality; noting several splices, dirt, brightness and contrast issues - and overall feeling it lacked the pristine image quality of the cartoons restored for the Golden and Platinum collections.

Porky Pig 101 was a modest financial success, and led Warner Archive to release more classic theatrical animated content as Blu-ray sets, such as Popeye the Sailor: The 1940s, Tex Avery Screwball Classics, Looney Tunes Collector's Choice, Looney Tunes Collector's Vault, and Tom and Jerry: The Golden Era Anthology, all of which garnered a much more positive fan reception.

== Disc 1 ==
#	Title	Year	Director	Co-starring	Series	Previous DVD/Blu-ray release
1	I Haven't Got a Hat	1935	Friz Freleng	Beans; Little Kitty; Ham and Ex; Oliver Owl	MM	Golden Collection: Volume 3
2	Gold Diggers of '49	1935	Tex Avery	Beans; Little Kitty	LT	Golden Collection: Volume 5
3	Boom Boom	1936	Jack King	Beans	LT	The Charge of the Light Brigade
4	Alpine Antics	1936	Jack King	Beans; Little Kitty	LT	Golden Collection: Volume 5
5	The Blow Out	1936	Tex Avery		LT	N/A
6	Westward Whoa (Note: Incorrectly uses the 1939-1940 variant of "The Merry-Go-Round Broke Down".)	1936	Jack King	Beans; Little Kitty; Ham and Ex	LT	N/A
7	Plane Dippy	1936	Tex Avery		LT	N/A
8	Fish Tales (Note: Incorrectly uses the opening theme from Rover's Rival.)	1936	Jack King		LT	N/A
9	Shanghaied Shipmates	1936	Jack King		LT	N/A
10	Porky's Pet	1936	Jack King		LT	N/A
11	Porky the Rain-Maker	1936	Tex Avery	Phenias Pig (debut)	LT	N/A
12	Porky's Poultry Plant	1936	Frank Tashlin		LT	Golden Collection: Volume 4
13	Porky's Moving Day	1936	Jack King		LT	N/A
14	Milk and Money	1936	Tex Avery	Phenias Pig	LT	Golden Collection: Volume 5
15	Little Beau Porky	1936	Frank Tashlin		LT	Golden Collection: Volume 4
16	The Village Smithy	1936	Tex Avery		LT	N/A
17	Porky in the North Woods	1936	Frank Tashlin		LT	Golden Collection: Volume 4
18	Porky the Wrestler (Note: Incorrectly uses the closing theme from Little Beau Porky.)	1937	Tex Avery		LT	N/A
19	Porky's Road Race	1937	Frank Tashlin		LT	Golden Collection: Volume 3
20	Picador Porky (Note: Incorrectly uses the opening theme from Porky's Tire Trouble.)	1937	Tex Avery		LT	N/A

=== Special features ===
- Audio commentaries
  - Jerry Beck on I Haven't Got a Hat
  - Michael Barrier on Porky's Poultry Plant
  - Mark Kausler on Porky in the North Woods

== Disc 2 ==
#	Title	Year	Director	Co-starring	Series	Previous DVD/Blu-ray release
1	Porky's Romance	1937	Frank Tashlin	Petunia Pig (debut)	LT	Golden Collection: Volume 3
2	Porky's Duck Hunt	1937	Tex Avery	Daffy Duck (debut)	LT	The Essential Daffy Duck
3	Porky and Gabby	1937	Ub Iwerks	Gabby Goat (debut)	LT	Black Legion
4	Porky's Building	1937	Frank Tashlin	Dirty Digg (debut)	LT	N/A
5	Porky's Super Service	1937	Ub Iwerks		LT	Kid Galahad
6	Porky's Badtime Story	1937	Bob Clampett	Gabby Goat	LT	N/A
7	Porky's Railroad	1937	Frank Tashlin	Dirty Digg	LT	Golden Collection: Volume 4
8	Get Rich Quick Porky (Note: Incorrectly uses the opening theme from Confusions of a Nutzy Spy and the closing theme from a different cartoon.)	1937	Bob Clampett	Gabby Goat	LT	N/A
9	Porky's Garden	1937	Tex Avery		LT	N/A
10	Rover's Rival	1937	Bob Clampett		LT	N/A
11	The Case of the Stuttering Pig	1937	Frank Tashlin	Petunia Pig	LT	Golden Collection: Volume 4
12	Porky's Double Trouble	1937	Frank Tashlin	Petunia Pig	LT	Golden Collection: Volume 5
13	Porky's Hero Agency	1937	Bob Clampett		LT	Marked Woman
14	Porky's Poppa	1938	Bob Clampett	Phenias Pig	LT	Golden Collection: Volume 5
15	Porky at the Crocadero	1938	Frank Tashlin		LT	Golden Collection: Volume 5
16	What Price Porky	1938	Bob Clampett	Daffy Duck	LT	Golden Collection: Volume 5
17	Porky's Phoney Express	1938	Cal Howard; Cal Dalton		LT	N/A
18	Porky's Five & Ten	1938	Bob Clampett		LT	Hollywood Hotel
19	Porky's Hare Hunt	1938	Ben Hardaway; Cal Dalton	Bugs Bunny (proto-type, debut)	LT	Platinum Collection: Volume 2
20	Injun Trouble	1938	Bob Clampett		LT	N/A

=== Special features ===
- Audio commentaries
  - Mark Kausler on Porky's Romance and The Case of the Stuttering Pig
  - Daniel Goldmark on Porky at the Crocadero

== Disc 3 ==
#	Title	Year	Director	Co-starring	Series	Previous DVD/Blu-ray release
1	Porky the Fireman	1938	Frank Tashlin		LT	Golden Collection: Volume 4
2	Porky's Party	1938	Bob Clampett		LT	Golden Collection: Volume 3
3	Porky's Spring Planting	1938	Frank Tashlin		LT	N/A
4	Porky & Daffy (Note: The opening is missing few seconds, starts on the WB shield.)	1938	Bob Clampett	Daffy Duck	LT	Angels with Dirty Faces
5	Wholly Smoke	1938	Frank Tashlin		LT	Golden Collection: Volume 5 Platinum Collection: Volume 3
6	Porky in Wackyland	1938	Bob Clampett	Yoyo Dodo (debut)	LT	Golden Collection: Volume 2 Platinum Collection: Volume 2
7	Porky's Naughty Nephew	1938	Bob Clampett	Pinky Pig (debut)	LT	N/A
8	Porky in Egypt	1938	Bob Clampett		LT	Golden Collection: Volume 3 Platinum Collection: Volume 2
9	The Daffy Doc	1938	Bob Clampett	Daffy Duck	LT	Golden Collection: Volume 5 The Essential Daffy Duck
10	Porky the Gob	1938	Ben Hardaway; Cal Dalton		LT	N/A
11	The Lone Stranger and Porky	1939	Bob Clampett		LT	The Hunchback of Notre Dame
12	It's an Ill Wind	1939	Ben Hardaway; Cal Dalton	Dizzy Duck (debut)	LT	N/A
13	Porky's Tire Trouble	1939	Bob Clampett		LT	N/A
14	Porky's Movie Mystery	1939	Bob Clampett		LT	N/A
15	Chicken Jitters	1939	Bob Clampett		LT	N/A
16	Porky and Teabiscuit	1939	Ben Hardaway; Cal Dalton	Phineas Pig	LT	Golden Collection: Volume 3
17	Kristopher Kolumbus Jr.	1939	Bob Clampett		LT	The Old Maid
18	Polar Pals	1939	Bob Clampett		LT	Golden Collection: Volume 5
19	Scalp Trouble	1938	Bob Clampett	Daffy Duck	LT	N/A
20	Old Glory	1939	Chuck Jones		MM	Golden Collection: Volume 2 Platinum Collection: Volume 1

=== Special features ===
- Audio commentaries
  - John Kricfalusi and Eddie Fitzgerald on Porky's Party
  - Daniel Goldmark on Wholly Smoke
  - Michael Barrier on Porky in Wackyland
  - Mark Kausler on The Daffy Doc
  - Jerry Beck and Martha Sigall on Old Glory
- Porky's Party storyboard reel

== Disc 4 ==
#	Title	Year	Director	Co-starring	Series	Previous DVD/Blu-ray release
1	Porky's Picnic	1939	Bob Clampett	Petunia Pig; Pinky Pig	LT	N/A
2	Wise Quacks	1939	Bob Clampett	Daffy Duck	LT	Golden Collection: Volume 5
3	Porky's Hotel	1939	Bob Clampett	Dizzy Duck	LT	N/A
4	Jeepers Creepers	1939	Bob Clampett		LT	N/A
5	Naughty Neighbors (Note: Incorrectly uses the opening theme from Porky's Tire Trouble twice.)	1939	Bob Clampett	Petunia Pig	LT	N/A
6	Pied Piper Porky	1939	Bob Clampett		LT	N/A
7	Porky the Giant Killer	1939	Ben Hardaway; Cal Dalton		LT	N/A
8	The Film Fan	1939	Bob Clampett		LT	Golden Collection: Volume 3
9	Porky's Last Stand	1940	Bob Clampett	Daffy Duck	LT	All This and Heaven Too
10	Africa Squeaks	1940	Bob Clampett		LT	N/A
11	Ali-Baba Bound	1940	Bob Clampett		LT	N/A
12	Pilgrim Porky	1940	Bob Clampett		LT	Golden Collection: Volume 5
13	Slap Happy Pappy	1940	Bob Clampett		LT	Brother Orchid
14	Porky's Poor Fish	1940	Bob Clampett		LT	Golden Collection: Volume 4
15	You Ought to Be in Pictures	1940	Friz Freleng	Daffy Duck	LT	Golden Collection: Volume 2 Platinum Collection: Volume 2
16	The Chewin' Bruin	1940	Bob Clampett		LT	N/A
17	Porky's Baseball Broadcast	1940	Friz Freleng		LT	Knute Rockne, All American
18	Patient Porky (Note: Despite being previously restored for Looney Tunes Golden Collection: Volume 5, this set uses an unrestored vault print of Patient Porky.)	1940	Bob Clampett		LT	Golden Collection: Volume 5
19	Calling Dr. Porky	1940	Friz Freleng		LT	N/A
20	Prehistoric Porky	1940	Bob Clampett		LT	Golden Collection: Volume 5

=== Special features ===
- Audio commentaries
  - Jerry Beck on You Ought to Be in Pictures
- Porky's Poor Fish storyboard reel

== Disc 5 ==
#	Title	Year	Director	Co-starring	Series	Previous DVD/Blu-ray release
1	The Sour Puss	1940	Bob Clampett		LT	Golden Collection: Volume 4
2	Porky's Hired Hand	1940	Friz Freleng		LT	N/A
3	The Timid Toreador	1940	Bob Clampett; Norman McCabe		LT	N/A
4	Porky's Snooze Reel	1941	Bob Clampett; Norman McCabe		LT	N/A
5	Porky's Bear Facts	1941	Friz Freleng		LT	N/A
6	Porky's Preview	1941	Tex Avery		LT	Golden Collection: Volume 5
7	Porky's Ant (Note: Incorrectly uses 1937's "Porky's Signature" theme from Porky's Railroad.)	1941	Chuck Jones		LT	N/A
8	A Coy Decoy	1941	Bob Clampett	Daffy Duck	LT	N/A
9	Porky's Prize Pony	1941	Chuck Jones		LT	N/A
10	Meet John Doughboy	1941	Bob Clampett		LT	Golden Collection: Volume 6
11	We, the Animals Squeak!	1941	Bob Clampett		LT	N/A
12	The Henpecked Duck	1941	Bob Clampett	Daffy Duck	LT	N/A
13	Notes to You	1941	Friz Freleng		LT	N/A
14	Robinson Crusoe, Jr.	1941	Norman McCabe		LT	N/A
15	Porky's Midnight Matinee	1941	Chuck Jones		LT	N/A
16	Porky's Pooch	1941	Bob Clampett	Charlie Dog (proto-type, debut)	LT	Golden Collection: Volume 5
17	Porky's Pastry Pirates	1942	Friz Freleng		LT	Larceny Inc.
18	Who's Who in the Zoo	1942	Norman McCabe		LT	In This Our Life
19	Porky's Cafe	1942	Chuck Jones	Conrad Cat	LT	N/A
20	Confusions of a Nutzy Spy (Note: Incorrectly uses 1936-1938 Looney Tunes closing title card with the 1937-1938 theme music.)	1943	Norman McCabe		LT	Golden Collection: Volume 6 (bonus short)
21	Porky Pig's Feat	1943	Frank Tashlin	Daffy Duck; Bugs Bunny (cameo)	LT	Golden Collection: Volume 3 Platinum Collection: Volume 3

=== Special features ===
- Audio commentaries
  - Greg Ford on Porky's Preview
  - Joe Dante on Porky Pig's Feat
- Porky's Breakdowns (1939)

== See also ==
- Looney Tunes and Merrie Melodies filmography
  - Looney Tunes and Merrie Melodies filmography (1929–1939)
  - Looney Tunes and Merrie Melodies filmography (1940–1949)
  - Looney Tunes and Merrie Melodies filmography (1950–1959)
  - Looney Tunes and Merrie Melodies filmography (1960–1969)
  - Looney Tunes and Merrie Melodies filmography (1970–present)
