= Picador Porky =

1937 film by Fred Avery

- Title card
- Directed by: Fred Avery
- Produced by: Leon Schlesinger
- Starring: Joe Dougherty; Mel Blanc
- Music by: Carl W. Stalling
- Animation by: Charles Jones; Sid Sutherland
- Color process: Black and white
- Production company: Leon Schlesinger Productions
- Distributed by: Warner Bros. Productions; The Vitaphone Corporation
- Release date: February 27, 1937
- Running time: 7 min
- Country: United States
- Language: English

Picador Porky is a 1937 American animated comedy short film directed by Fred Avery. The short was released on February 27, 1937. It is the 82nd film in the Looney Tunes series, the twentieth cartoon to feature Porky Pig, as well as the first to feature voice lines by Mel Blanc, who would eventually replace Joe Dougherty in voicing Porky, as well as become the series' main voice actor until its retirement in 1969.

== Plot ==
An intertitle describes Mexico to be a calm and sleepy place, only to show the actual Mexico's loud and chaotic lifestyle. Porky Pig and two friends enter and find a bullfight with an award of 1000 pesos. They conspire to join by having Porky fight his friends in a bull costume. As they enter, they find a bull who is immediately smitten with the costume. The two men find a bottle of liquor and drink it, fascinated by its taste, but then drunkenly sneak away.

Porky is made to fight the actual bull from earlier, which is used to replace the missing "bull". Not realizing the difference, he hides the bull in his red cloth before summoning him to the audience's cheers. Porky then tricks the bull with plungers, which are removed except for one, which slips on the bull's nose; when it is removed, the bull's nose is stretched to his embarrassment.

Porky only realizes the mistake when his friends emerge and sing drunkenly. During break time, Porky drinks water and spits while the bull mistakes a funnel for a telephone. Porky exploits a safety zone to no avail. His two friends conspire to beat up the bull behind a wall and emerge instead, surrendering and allowing Porky to win easily as the audience does not notice the difference. As Porky wins the money, he is somehow horrified into giving the money to the bull, much to its confusion.

== Home media ==
Picador Porky is available on disc 1 of the Porky Pig 101 DVD set.

== See also ==
- Porky Pig filmography
- Looney Tunes and Merrie Melodies filmography (1930–1939)
