= The Village Smithy (1936 film) =

1936 film by Fred Avery

- Title card
- Directed by: Fred Avery
- Produced by: Leon Schlesinger
- Starring: Joe Dougherty
- Music by: Carl W. Stalling
- Animation by: Cecil Surry; Sid Sutherland
- Color process: Black and white
- Production company: Leon Schlesinger Productions
- Distributed by: Warner Bros. Productions; The Vitaphone Corporation
- Release date: December 5, 1936
- Running time: 7 min
- Country: United States
- Language: English

The Village Smithy is a 1936 American animated comedy short film directed by Fred Avery. The short was released on December 5, 1936. It is the 78th film in the Looney Tunes series and the sixteenth cartoon to feature Porky Pig. It is a parody of "The Village Blacksmith", introducing a level of self-reference not previously seen in cartoons, which would become commonplace in Avery's work.

== Plot ==
The narrator recites the poem "The Village Blacksmith", summoning a chestnut tree and a blacksmith, who does not have "large and sinewy hands" as claimed in the poem, and has to inflate them. He then summons a shop for the blacksmith and a crowd that watches him fan coals. Alarmed by the strenuous manual work, he angrily throws the machinery away, only for the narrator to introduce Porky, who is regarded as the hero much to the blacksmith's chagrin.

The narrator gives them a task of producing horseshoes for a horse, though he mistakenly summons a camel at first. The blacksmith orders Porky to retrieve a horseshoe of a certain size, only for Porky to accidentally retrieve a low-quality plastic lookalike. A running gag involves the horseshoe releasing a large amount of force upon being hit; Porky is hit on the head multiple times with a hammer while hammering it, while the blacksmith bounces on the leg with the horseshoe while testing it. He throws the horseshoe, managing to have it bounce off objects and hit his head multiple times, even after he closes the door. He also decides to slowly place it down, only for it to bounce with extraordinary force and hit him again. He eventually holds the horseshoe with a clamp, which causes it to shake, then shoots it with a revolver, somehow negating its strength. He orders Porky to retrieve actual metal horseshoes.

Porky heats a horseshoe until it is red hot, only to drop it onto the horse, who runs over the blacksmith and causes him to land onto the carriage. The horse destroys a general store, runs over traffic police, destroys a bank being broken in by a robber who does not realize his easy access to the money, misses a miner, and flips itself over a cliff, causing the blacksmith to comment, "Phew, what a buggy ride!" The horse runs into some fences and are launched backwards, reversing the entire process; the miner realizes the situation, the bank is rebuilt and the general store is moved while being reconstructed. Returning to his shop, the blacksmith demands an explanation from Porky, only for Porky to reenact the events that happened previously, causing a time loop.

== Home media ==
The Village Smithy is available on disc 1 of the Porky Pig 101 DVD set.

== See also ==
- Porky Pig filmography
- Looney Tunes and Merrie Melodies filmography (1930–1939)
