= We, the Animals – Squeak! =

1941 film by Robert Clampett

- Title card
- Directed by: Robert Clampett
- Story by: Melvin Millar
- Produced by: Leon Schlesinger
- Starring: Mel Blanc; Sara Berner (uncredited); Billy Bletcher (uncredited); Phil Kramer
- Music by: Carl W. Stalling
- Animation by: Isadore Ellis
- Color process: Black and white
- Production company: Leon Schlesinger Productions
- Distributed by: Warner Bros. Pictures
- Release date: August 9, 1941
- Running time: 7 mins
- Country: United States
- Language: English

We, the Animals – Squeak! is a 1941 American animated comedy short film directed by Robert Clampett. The short was released on August 9, 1941. It is part of the Looney Tunes series and the 90th cartoon to feature Porky Pig.

This short is a parody of the 1930s radio program, "We the People", an early reality program where people would share unusual stories with the audience. Porky Pig is the program's moderator.

== Plot ==
The cartoon begins with the radio program, "We, the Animals – Squeak!" in progress, and a hare finishing his story about how he got revenge on a hunter that had been stalking him. Porky Pig, the program's host, introduces the Irish-accented Kansas City Kitty, a champion mouse catcher.

Kansas City Kitty tells her life's story, including her marriage to Tom Collins and the birth of her son, Little Patrick. The main thrust of her story is how her reputation as a mouse catcher was nearly ruined by the mice, who – tired of being harassed by Kansas City Kitty and being kept away from the food – plot their revenge. In the catacombs of the house's walls, the lead mouse (Ratt McNalley) plots a scheme to kidnap Little Patrick while his mother is asleep. The mice carry out the plan and successfully flee the angry Kitty. The mother cat desperately claws at the wall, but Ratt stands up to her and threatens to brutally kill Little Patrick if their demands are not met.

Those demands – allowing free rein of the house – are played out in the next scene. A series of spot gags follow, where the mice carry food from the refrigerator, get drunk on milk and generally harass a distraught Kitty. Meanwhile, one of Ratt's henchmen decides to tease Little Patrick, but Patrick proves to be very resourceful and quickly turns the tables on his captor. Patrick escapes and reunites with his mother; Ratt, who is taunting Kitty, quickly knows what this means and tries to flee, but Kitty quickly catches all the mice and "shows those little devils they couldn't harm kit nor kin (a play on words of "kith nor kin") of Kansas City Kitty!"

The story brings loud cheers from the audience, and an impressed Porky gives her a present: a wimpy little mouse that scares her. "Well, faith'n me jabbers," intones the mouse, just as the Irish-shaped iris out ends the cartoon.

== Home media ==
We, the Animals Squeak! is available on disc 5 of the Porky Pig 101 DVD set.

== See also ==
- Porky Pig filmography
- Looney Tunes and Merrie Melodies filmography (1940–1949)
- List of animated films in the public domain in the United States

== Succession ==
Preceded by Meet John Doughboy	Porky Pig filmography 1941	Succeeded by The Henpecked Duck
