= Porky's Ant =

1941 film by Charles M. Jones

- Title card
- Directed by: Charles M. Jones
- Written by: Rich Hogan
- Produced by: Leon Schlesinger
- Starring: Mel Blanc
- Music by: Carl W. Stalling
- Animation by: Rudolph Larriva
- Color process: Black-and-white
- Production company: Leon Schlesinger Productions
- Distributed by: Warner Bros. Pictures
- Release date: May 10, 1941
- Running time: 7 min
- Country: United States
- Language: English

Porky's Ant is a 1941 American animated comedy short film directed by Charles M. Jones. The short was released on April 19, 1941. It is part of the Looney Tunes series and the 86th cartoon to feature Porky Pig. Due to its stereotypical depiction of Africans, it has not been restored or released on home media outside of Porky Pig 101.

== Plot ==
Porky journeys to Central Africa in search of a pygmy ant worth $150,000, with a native similar in appearance to Inki carrying his luggage. They are followed by the ant without noticing. The native notices the ant and runs over Porky with his luggage. Porky notices and gives chase. He tries to trap the ant with chocolate and flypaper to no avail. The ant runs to a lion and tricks Porky into lassoing in its claw. After the lion wakes up, it chases the native into running over Porky. The ant saves Porky and the native from the lion by tripping it with the flypaper. As thanks, the ant demands the larger bone on the native's head.

== See also ==
- Porky Pig filmography
- Looney Tunes and Merrie Melodies filmography (1940–1949)
- List of animated films in the public domain in the United States
