= Looney Tunes and Merrie Melodies filmography (1930–1939) =

A total of 271 theatrical animated shorts were released by Warner Bros. Pictures under the Looney Tunes (LT) and Merrie Melodies (MM) banners between the years of 1930 and 1939.

== Series overview ==
Year	Shorts	Originally released	
Year	Shorts	First released	Last released
1930	7	April 19, 1930	December 13, 1930
1931	15	January 31, 1931	December 18, 1931
1932	26	January 9, 1932	December 21, 1932
1933	22	January 14, 1933	December 16, 1933
1934	25	January 5, 1934	December 15, 1934
1935	23	January 19, 1935	November 20, 1935
1936	32	January 11, 1936	December 19, 1936
1947	36	January 2, 1937	December 18, 1937
1938	40	January 1, 1938	December 31, 1938
1939	45	January 7, 1939	December 29, 1939

== 1930 ==
All cartoons are Looney Tunes starring Bosko and are all directed and produced by Hugh Harman and Rudolf Ising, along with Leon Schlesinger as associate producer. All cartoons are also scored by Frank Marsales, who would score all cartoons through 1932.

Directing credits would not be shown for the cartoons until Buddy's Day Out in 1933.

No. overall	No. in year	Title	Animated by	Original release date	Official DVD/Blu-Ray Availability
1	1	Sinkin' in the Bathtub	Friz Freleng	April 19, 1930 (Warner Bros. Theater Premiere); May 25, 1930 (US Premiere)	DVD: Golden Collection: Vol. 3 (extra, unrestored); Blu-Ray: Platinum Collection: Vol. 2 (extra, unrestored); Blu-Ray: Collector's Vault: Vol. 3 (restored)
Bosko gets out of his bathtub as he goes on a car trip with his girlfriend Honey (in her debut).
2	2	Congo Jazz	C. G. Maxwell & Paul Smith	July 26, 1930 (Note: Archived from a July 29 article, this is based on the fact that new cartoon shorts would typically premiere in theaters on Saturdays.) (earliest known date)	DVD: Golden Collection: Vol. 6
Bosko goes hunting for tigers in a jungle, but winds up befriending the jungle animals instead.
3	3	Hold Anything	Friz Freleng & Norm Blackburn	August 9, 1930 (Note: Archived from an August 15 article, this is based on the fact that new cartoon shorts would typically premiere in theaters on Saturdays.) (earliest known date)	N/A
Bosko works on a construction site with several small mice.
4	4	The Booze Hangs High	Friz Freleng & Paul Smith	September 20, 1930 (Note: Archived from a September 26 article, although a review from Variety magazine reveals that its release could've been as early as September 9, as it could've been from an advance screening. Based on the Variety review, the short likely premiered on September 6, since new cartoon shorts would typically premiere in theaters on Saturdays.) (earliest known date)	DVD: Golden Collection: Vol. 6
Bosko is at a farm dancing with farm animals, including a family of three pigs who find a boozy drink bottle in their food.
5	5	Box Car Blues	Rollin Hamilton & C. G. Maxwell	October 18, 1930 (Note: Archived from an October 24 article, this is based on the fact that new cartoon shorts would typically premiere in theaters on Saturdays.) (earliest known date)	N/A
Bosko travels with a banjo-playing pig inside a boxcar.
6	6	Big Man from the North	Friz Freleng & Robert Edmunds	November 22, 1930 (earliest known date)	DVD: Smart Money (extra, unrestored)
Police officer Bosko goes on a quest to find the wanted villain found in the posters.
7	7	Ain't Nature Grand!	Friz Freleng & Norm Blackburn	December 13, 1930 (earliest known date)	N/A
Bosko goes fishing at a lake, but a butterfly leads him into a song-and-dance routine with the nature around him.

== 1931 ==
This year marks the debut of the Merrie Melodies series. All Merrie Melodies cartoons are directed by Rudolf Ising, all Looney Tunes cartoons until The Tree's Knees are directed by Hugh Harman and Ising and all Looney Tunes cartoons as of Bosko Shipwrecked! are directed by Harman.

No. overall	No. in year	Title	Series	Directed by	Animated by	Recurring characters	Original release date	Official DVD/Blu-Ray Availability
8	1	Ups 'n Downs	LT	Hugh Harman & Rudolf Ising	Rollin Hamilton & Paul Smith	Bosko	January 31, 1931 (earliest known date)	N/A
Bosko works as a hot dog salesman at a fair, and is determined to win the fair's race with his mechanical horse.
9	2	Dumb Patrol	LT	Hugh Harman & Rudolf Ising	Friz Freleng & C. G. Maxwell	Bosko; Honey	February 28, 1931 (Note: Archived from a March 3 article, this is based on the fact that new cartoon shorts would typically premiere in theaters on Saturdays.) (earliest known date)	Blu-Ray: Safe in Hell (extra, restored)
Bosko is a pilot during World War I and battles an enemy who destroys his plane.
10	3	Yodeling Yokels	LT	Hugh Harman & Rudolf Ising	Rollin Hamilton & Norm Blackburn	Bosko; Honey	March 21, 1931 (Note: Archived from a March 26 article, this is based on the fact that new cartoon shorts would typically premiere in theaters on Saturdays.) (earliest known date)	N/A
Bosko yodels to his girlfriend Honey while wandering through the Alps to her house. When Honey gets trapped on an iceberg flowing down the river, Bosko must save her with the aid of two dogs.
11	4	Bosko's Holiday	LT	Hugh Harman & Rudolf Ising	Friz Freleng & Paul Smith	Bosko; Honey	May 2, 1931 (Note: Archived from a May 4 article, this is based on the fact that new cartoon shorts would typically premiere in theaters on Saturdays. It could've actually premiered on April 25.) (earliest known date)	N/A
Bosko gets a phone call from Honey, and goes on a picnic with her.
12	5	The Tree's Knees	LT	Hugh Harman & Rudolf Ising	Friz Freleng & Rollin Hamilton	Bosko	May 16, 1931 (Note: Archived from a May 19 article, this is based on the fact that new cartoon shorts would typically premiere in theaters on Saturdays.) (earliest known date)	N/A
Bosko wanders through the forest with an axe, but trees come to life and song-and-dance routines occur.
13	6	Lady, Play Your Mandolin!	MM	Rudolf Ising	Rollin Hamilton & Norm Blackburn	Foxy; Roxy	June 13, 1931 (Note: Archived from a June 16 article, this is based on the fact that new cartoon shorts would typically premiere in theaters on Saturdays.) (earliest known date)	DVD: Golden Collection: Vol. 1 (extra, unrestored); Blu-Ray: Platinum Collection: Vol. 2 (extra, unrestored); Blu-Ray: Collector's Vault: Vol. 3 (restored)
Foxy (in his debut) is a gaucho visiting a local saloon disguised as a cafeteria. Note: First cartoon in the Merrie Melodies series.
14	7	One More Time	MM	Rudolf Ising	Friz Freleng & Paul Smith	Foxy; Roxy	August 8, 1931 (Note: Archived from an August 11 article, this is based on the fact that new cartoon shorts would typically premiere in theaters on Saturdays. It could've actually premiered on August 1.) (earliest known date)	DVD: Golden Collection: Vol. 6
Foxy is a police officer who deals with armed criminals, traffic violations, and Roxy's huge dog. A group of gangsters kidnap Roxy while making their getaway, so Foxy chases them on a mechanical horse.
15	8	Smile, Darn Ya, Smile!	MM	Rudolf Ising	Friz Freleng & C. G. Maxwell	Foxy; Roxy	August 15, 1931 (Note: Archived from an August 16 article, this is based on the fact that new cartoon shorts would typically premiere in theaters on Saturdays.) (earliest known date)	DVD: Golden Collection: Vol. 6
Foxy has a nightmare about being a trolley engineer with various problems.
16	9	Bosko Shipwrecked!	LT	Hugh Harman	Rollin Hamilton & Larry Martin	Bosko	September 5, 1931 (Note: Archived from a September 10 article, this is based on the fact that new cartoon shorts would typically premiere in theaters on Saturdays.)	N/A
Bosko is the captain of the ship who gets shipwrecked on an island inhabited by animals and Indians.
17	10	Bosko the Doughboy	LT	Hugh Harman	Rollin Hamilton & C. G. Maxwell	Bosko	October 10, 1931 (Note: Archived from an October 11 article, this is based on the fact that new cartoon shorts would typically premiere in theaters on Saturdays. It likely premiered on October 3, since the next cartoon (Bosko's Soda Fountain) would've premiered on October 10.) (earliest known date)	DVD: Golden Collection: Vol. 6
In another World War I-related short, Bosko is a doughboy who downs a pelican and saves a hippo struck by a cannonball.
18	11	Bosko's Soda Fountain	LT	Hugh Harman	Friz Freleng & Rollin Hamilton	Bosko; Honey; Wilber	October 10, 1931 (Note: Archived from an October 13 article, this is based on the fact that new cartoon shorts would typically premiere in theaters on Saturdays.) (earliest known date)	Blu-Ray: It's a Wise Child (extra, unrestored)
Bosko runs an ice cream parlor that sells ice cream sodas and cones. Meanwhile, Honey teaches a piano lesson to Wilber (in his debut), who demands an ice cream cone.
19	12	You Don't Know What You're Doin'!	MM	Rudolf Ising	Friz Freleng & Norm Blackburn	Piggy; Fluffy	October 21, 1931 (Note: The earliest listing for this short was October 24. Because of the previous archived link, it likely premiered on October 17, since new cartoon shorts would typically premiere in theaters on Saturdays.) (earliest known date)	DVD: Golden Collection: Vol. 6
Piggy (in his debut) picks up his girlfriend Fluffy (also in her debut) and takes her to a theater where an orchestra is playing.
20	13	Hittin' the Trail for Hallelujah Land	MM	Rudolf Ising	Friz Freleng & Paul Smith	Piggy; Fluffy	November 14, 1931	N/A
Piggy must rescue Fluffy and Uncle Tom from perilous predicaments and villains. Note: One of the Censored Eleven and the earliest of them.
21	14	Bosko's Fox Hunt	LT	Hugh Harman	Rollin Hamilton & Norm Blackburn	Bosko; Bruno; Foxy	November 28, 1931 (Note: Archived from a December 3 article, this is based on the fact that new cartoon shorts would typically premiere in theaters on Saturdays.) (earliest known date)	Blu-Ray: It's a Wise Child (extra, unrestored)
Bosko goes on a fox hunt with his dog Bruno (in his debut), but Foxy evades them from catching or shooting him.
22	15	Red-Headed Baby	MM	Rudolf Ising	Rollin Hamilton & C. G. Maxwell	N/A (one-shot cartoon)	December 18, 1931 (Note: Archived from a December 23 article, this is based on the fact that new cartoon shorts would typically premiere in theaters on Saturdays.) (earliest known date)	DVD: Cimarron (extra, unrestored); Blu-Ray: Cimarron (extra, restored)
Around Christmas Eve, a red-haired doll and other toys come to life when the toymaker departs. Note: First cartoon without any recurring characters.

== 1932 ==
All Looney Tunes cartoons are directed by Hugh Harman, while all Merrie Melodies cartoons are directed by Rudolf Ising.

All cartoons from this year fell into the public domain between 1960 and 1961 since their copyrights were not renewed by Warner Bros. Pictures and United Artists, with four exceptions: Ride Him, Bosko!, Bosko the Drawback, Bosko's Dizzy Date, and Bosko's Woodland Daze. These four cartoons had their copyrights renewed by Warner Bros. Pictures in 1961 and will not be in the public domain until January 1, 2028 when the maximum term for other copyrights will expire.

No. overall	No. in year	Title	Series	Directed by	Animated by	Recurring characters	Original release date	Official DVD/Blu-Ray Availability
23	1	Bosko at the Zoo	LT	Hugh Harman	Friz Freleng & Larry Martin	Bosko; Honey	January 9, 1932	N/A
Bosko takes Honey to a zoo and encounters various animals.
24	2	Pagan Moon	MM	Rudolf Ising	Rollin Hamilton & Norm Blackburn	N/A (one-shot cartoon)	January 31, 1932	N/A
A Polynesian boy plays a ukulele on the beach and various other instruments underwater.
25	3	Battling Bosko	LT	Hugh Harman	Friz Freleng & Paul Smith	Bosko; Honey	February 6, 1932	N/A
Bosko battles Gas House Harry in a boxing match.
26	4	Freddy the Freshman	MM	Rudolf Ising	Friz Freleng & Paul Smith	N/A (one-shot cartoon)	February 20, 1932	Blu-Ray: The Mask of Fu Manchu (extra, restored)
Freddy the Freshman crashes a pep rally and plays a football game.
27	5	Big-Hearted Bosko	LT	Hugh Harman	Friz Freleng & Rollin Hamilton	Bosko; Bruno	March 5, 1932	N/A
Bosko and Bruno find an orphan baby in a basket after ice skating, and try to cheer it up.
28	6	Crosby, Columbo, and Vallee	MM	Rudolf Ising	Rollin Hamilton & C. G. Maxwell	N/A (one-shot cartoon)	March 19, 1932	Blu-Ray: 20,000 Years in Sing Sing (extra, unrestored)
Many American Indians are unhappy about the way that Bing Crosby, Russ Columbo and Rudy Vallée have influenced their squaws, so they sing the title song.
29	7	Bosko's Party	LT	Hugh Harman	Friz Freleng & Larry Martin	Bosko; Honey; Wilber	March 26, 1932 (Note: Archived from a March 27 article, this is based on the fact that new cartoon shorts would typically premiere in theaters on Saturdays.) (earliest known date)	N/A
Bosko hosts a birthday party for his girlfriend Honey.
30	8	Goopy Geer	MM	Rudolf Ising	Friz Freleng & Rollin Hamilton	Goopy Geer	April 16, 1932	Blu-Ray: The Beast of the City (extra, restored)
Goopy Geer (in his debut) plays the piano on the stage at the same saloon from Lady, Play Your Mandolin!.
31	9	Bosko and Bruno	LT	Hugh Harman	Rollin Hamilton & Paul Smith	Bosko; Bruno	April 30, 1932 (Note: Archived from a May 3 article, this is based on the fact that new cartoon shorts would typically premiere in theaters on Saturdays.) (earliest known date)	Blu-Ray: The Beast of the City (extra, unrestored); Blu-Ray: Skyscraper Souls (extra, unrestored)
Bosko and his dog Bruno investigate the railroad tracks.
32	10	It's Got Me Again!	MM	Rudolf Ising	Friz Freleng & Thomas McKimson	N/A (one-shot cartoon)	May 14, 1932	DVD: Golden Collection: Vol. 3 (extra, unrestored); Blu-Ray: Platinum Collection: Vol. 2 (extra, unrestored)
Many small mice play various instruments and scare away an angry cat. Note: Nominated for the Academy Award for Best Animated Short Film in 1933.
33	11	Moonlight for Two	MM	Rudolf Ising	Friz Freleng & Larry Martin	Goopy Geer	June 11, 1932	DVD: Forbidden Hollywood Collection: Vol. 3 (extra unrestored); Blu-Ray: Tarzan the Ape Man (extra, restored)
A hillbilly Goopy Geer takes his sweetheart to a cabin where a square dance is taking place.
34	12	Bosko's Dog Race	LT	Hugh Harman	Rollin Hamilton & Norm Blackburn	Bosko; Honey; Bruno	June 25, 1932	N/A
Bosko's dog Bruno is determined to win a dog race.
35	13	The Queen Was in the Parlor	MM	Rudolf Ising	Friz Freleng & Paul Smith	Goopy Geer	July 2, 1932 (Note: Archived from a July 3 article, this is based on the fact that new cartoon shorts would typically premiere in theaters on Saturdays.) (earliest known date)	Blu-Ray: The Mask of Fu Manchu (extra, restored); Blu-Ray: 20,000 Years in Sing Sing (extra, restored)
When the king hippo returns to his castle and questions about the queen, he is told that she won't be seen. Meanwhile, jester Goopy Geer battles a Black Knight who kidnaps the princess.
36	14	Bosko at the Beach	LT	Hugh Harman	Friz Freleng & Rollin Hamilton	Bosko; Honey; Bruno; Wilber	July 8, 1932 (earliest known date)	N/A
Bosko, Honey, Bruno and Wilber are at a beach. When Wilber gets swept up by a big wave while playing in a puddle, Bosko tries to save him, but the waves repeatedly push them apart. So Bruno uses a log with an electric fan to save them.
37	15	I Love a Parade	MM	Rudolf Ising	Rollin Hamilton & Thomas McKimson	N/A (one-shot cartoon)	August 6, 1932	DVD: Golden Collection: Vol. 6 (extra, unrestored)
A circus is held featuring many different acts including Jo Jo the wild man, Siamese Twins depicted as pigs, a hippo who dances in a hula, and a cat who crosses a tight rope while holding an umbrella.
38	16	Bosko's Store	LT	Hugh Harman	Friz Freleng & Robert McKimson	Bosko; Honey; Bruno; Wilber	August 13, 1932	Blu-Ray: Jewel Robbery (extra, unrestored)
Bosko cleans his general store and gets phone calls from customers. When Wilber comes in, he causes chaos and beats up Bosko.
39	17	Bosko the Lumberjack	LT	Hugh Harman	Friz Freleng & C. G. Maxwell	Bosko; Honey	September 3, 1932	N/A
Bosko is a lumberjack who chops down a sapling. When his girlfriend Honey is kidnapped by a logger, Bosko sets off to rescue her.
40	18	You're Too Careless with Your Kisses!	MM	Rudolf Ising	Rollin Hamilton & Larry Martin	N/A (one-shot cartoon)	September 10, 1932	Blu-Ray: Jewel Robbery (extra, restored)
A bumblebee comes home to see his wife, who accuses him for drinking late and takes over as the honey collector. When a spider kidnaps her, the male bee calls for all the other bees to stop the spider.
41	19	Ride Him, Bosko!	LT	Hugh Harman	Friz Freleng & Norm Blackburn	Bosko; Honey; Goopy Geer	September 17, 1932	DVD: Golden Collection: Vol. 6
Bosko is a cowboy riding his horse in the Old West.
42	20	I Wish I Had Wings	MM	Rudolf Ising	Rollin Hamilton & Paul Smith	N/A (one-shot cartoon)	September 22, 1932 (earliest known date)	Blu-Ray: Tarzan the Ape Man (extra, restored)
A black chick without wings uses a pair of discarded corsets and panties to get a meal on the farm.
43	21	Bosko the Drawback	LT	Hugh Harman	Friz Freleng & Robert McKimson	Bosko; Goopy Geer	October 22, 1932	N/A
Bosko plays a football game similar to the one in Freddy the Freshman.
44	22	A Great Big Bunch of You	MM	Rudolf Ising	Rollin Hamilton & Thomas McKimson	N/A (one-shot cartoon)	November 12, 1932	Blu-Ray: One Way Passage (extra, restored)
A mannequin in the city dump improvises a piano, from the junk there, to play and sing the title song. The various animals and animated junk perform in segued vignettes.
45	23	Bosko's Dizzy Date	LT	Hugh Harman	Rollin Hamilton & Robert McKimson	Bosko; Honey; Bruno; Wilber	November 14, 1932 (Note: Archived from a November 12 article, it's possible that this short actually premiered on November 12, since new cartoon shorts would typically premiere in theaters on Saturdays.) (earliest known date)	N/A
Honey gives Wilber a music lesson, but he always plays the tune on his violin incorrectly. Honey then calls Bosko to go on a date.
46	24	Three's a Crowd	MM	Rudolf Ising	Rollin Hamilton & Larry Martin	N/A (one-shot cartoon)	December 10, 1932	N/A
After an old man leaves the library when the clock strikes, characters from various books come to life.
47	25	Bosko's Woodland Daze	LT	Hugh Harman	Friz Freleng & Paul Smith	Bosko; Bruno	December 17, 1932 (Note: Archived from a December 18 article, this is based on the fact that new cartoon shorts would typically premiere in theaters on Saturdays.) (earliest known date)	N/A
Bosko and his dog Bruno go out for a walk in the woods. Elves, fairies, and a hairy giant are involved in their misadventures.
48	26	The Shanty Where Santy Claus Lives	MM	Rudolf Ising	Rollin Hamilton & Norm Blackburn	N/A (one-shot cartoon)	December 21, 1932 (WB Theater Premiere); December 24, 1932 (US Premiere)	DVD: Lady Killer (extra, unrestored)
A sad boy gets happy when Santa Claus comes on Christmas Eve.

== 1933 ==
As of Buddy's Day Out, the directors are now credited, under the text "Supervision". All cartoons until Bosko's Picture Show are scored by Frank Marsales.

No. overall	No. in year	Title	Series	Directed by	Animated by	Recurring characters	Original release date	Official DVD/Blu-Ray Availability
49	1	Bosko in Dutch	LT	Friz Freleng & Hugh Harman	Friz Freleng & Thomas McKimson	Bosko; Honey; Bruno; Wilber; Goopy Geer	January 14, 1933	N/A
Bosko, Honey and various animals go skating on a frozen pond in the Netherlands. When Wilber and another cat similar to him fall into a hole in the ice, Bosko attempts to save them.
50	2	One Step Ahead of My Shadow	MM	Rudolf Ising	Friz Freleng & C. G. Maxwell	N/A (one-shot cartoon)	February 4, 1933	DVD: Forbidden Hollywood Collection: Vol. 3 (extra, unrestored); Blu-Ray: Footlight Parade (extra, unrestored)
In a Chinese city, a Chinese boy rows his boat to his sweetheart. When a dragon escapes his cage and enters their house, the boy attempts stop him from chasing the girl.
51	3	Bosko in Person	LT	Friz Freleng & Hugh Harman	Rollin Hamilton & Robert McKimson	Bosko; Honey	February 11, 1933	DVD: Golden Collection: Vol. 6
Bosko and Honey perform a vaudeville act on a stage, including playing the piano and dancing.
52	4	Young and Healthy	MM	Rudolf Ising	Rollin Hamilton & Larry Martin	N/A (one-shot cartoon)	February 23, 1933 (earliest known date)	Blu-Ray/DVD: Footlight Parade (extra, unrestored); Blu-Ray: 42nd Street (extra, unrestored)
A king is bored with the stupid people in his court, so he goes out in search of younger people.
53	5	Bosko the Speed King	LT	Hugh Harman	Friz Freleng & Paul Smith	Bosko; Honey	March 5, 1933 (Note: Archived from a March 7 article, this is based on the fact that new cartoon shorts would typically premiere in theaters on Saturdays.) (earliest known date)	N/A
There are many old cars in a car race, but Bosko is the one with his new race car to beat them all.
54	6	The Organ Grinder	MM	Rudolf Ising	Rollin Hamilton & Thomas McKimson	N/A (one-shot cartoon)	April 2, 1933 (earliest known date)	DVD: The Mayor of Hell (extra, unrestored); Blu-Ray: Little Women (extra, restored)
An Italian organ grinder plays his music in a ghetto neighborhood filled with immigrants.
55	7	Wake Up the Gypsy in Me	MM	Rudolf Ising	Friz Freleng & Larry Silverman	N/A (one-shot cartoon)	May 13, 1933	DVD: Picture Snatcher (extra, unrestored)
Russian Gypsies sing and dance in a Russian village. When an underage girl is kidnapped by a mad monk named "Rice Puddin'", the villagers set off to rescue her.
56	8	Bosko's Knight-Mare	LT	Hugh Harman	Robert McKimson & Robert Stokes	Bosko; Honey; Bruno	June 8, 1933	N/A
Bosko dreams about being a knight who tries to rescue Honey from the Black Knight.
57	9	I Like Mountain Music	MM	Rudolf Ising	Friz Freleng & Larry Martin	N/A (one-shot cartoon)	June 14, 1933	DVD: Flying Down to Rio (extra, unrestored); DVD: Golden Collection: Vol. 6 (extra, unrestored); Blu-Ray: Ladies They Talk About (extra, restored); Blu-Ray: Little Women (extra, restored); Blu-Ray: The Gay Divorcee (extra, restored)
Characters on magazines at a drugstore come to life and put on a show. When a man on the crime magazine starts robbing cash, the detective magazine's sleuths must catch him.
58	10	Bosko the Sheep-Herder	LT	Hugh Harman	Rollin Hamilton & C. G. Maxwell	Bosko; Honey; Bruno	June 14, 1933	N/A
While Bosko is minding a flock of sheep, he is tempted into using them as musical instruments. When a wolf dressed as a sheep steals a lamb, Bosko and Bruno set off to rescue the lamb.
59	11	Beau Bosko	LT	Friz Freleng & Hugh Harman	Rollin Hamilton & Norm Blackburn	Bosko; Honey	June 23, 1933 (earliest known date)	Blu-Ray: Bombshell (extra)
In the French Foreign Legion, Bosko is sent out to capture Ali Oop.
60	12	Shuffle Off to Buffalo	MM	Rudolf Ising & Friz Freleng	Friz Freleng & Paul Smith	N/A (one-shot cartoon)	July 8, 1933	DVD: Golden Collection: Vol. 6
A look inside a stork's baby factory is shown.
61	13	Bosko's Mechanical Man	LT	Hugh Harman	Friz Freleng & Thomas McKimson	Bosko; Honey; Bruno	July 22, 1933 (Note: Archived from a July 24 article, this is based on the fact that new cartoon shorts would typically premiere in theaters on Saturdays.) (earliest known date)	DVD: Morning Glory (extra, unrestored)
A robot that Bosko builds and expected to clean Honey's house chases her. So Bosko destroys it with dynamite.
62	14	The Dish Ran Away with the Spoon	MM	Rudolf Ising	Rollin Hamilton & Robert McKimson	N/A (one-shot cartoon)	July 29, 1933 (Note: Archived from a July 31 article, this is based on the fact that new cartoon shorts would typically premiere in theaters on Saturdays.) (earliest known date)	DVD: Golden Collection: Vol. 6
Dishes and utensils come to life in a bakery at midnight. When the Yeast Beast kidnaps Miss Dish, Mister Spoon and the other utensils must stop him.
63	15	Bosko the Musketeer	LT	Hugh Harman	Rollin Hamilton & Robert Stokes	Bosko; Honey; Bruno	August 12, 1933	N/A
While miming the moves of a fencer in Honey's house, Bosko dreams about being a musketeer.
64	16	We're in the Money	MM	Rudolf Ising	Friz Freleng & Larry Martin	N/A (one-shot cartoon)	August 19, 1933 (Note: Archived from an August 20 article, this is based on the fact that new cartoon shorts would typically premiere in theaters on Saturdays.) (earliest known date)	DVD: Golden Collection: Vol. 6
When an old man exits his department and closes it for the night, a group of toys come to life and play the title song. Even the money joins in at the end.
65	17	Bosko's Picture Show	LT	Friz Freleng & Hugh Harman	Friz Freleng & C. G. Maxwell	Bosko; Honey; Bruno	August 22, 1933 (earliest known date)	DVD: Golden Collection: Vol. 6
Bosko hosts a movie screening at a movie theater, including a newsreel titled "Out-Of-Tone News", a short subject titled "Spite of Everything", and a "TNT Pictures" production featuring his girlfriend Honey titled "He Done Her Dirt (and How!)". When Dirty Dalton in the movie kidnaps Honey, Bosko goes through the movie screen to save her. Note: Final WB cartoon made by Harman-Ising Productions.
66	18	Buddy's Day Out	LT	Tom Palmer	Bill Mason	Buddy; Cookie	September 9, 1933	DVD: Golden Collection: Vol. 6
After Buddy and Cookie (in their debut) set up their picnic, Cookie's baby brother Elmer is scolded for eating from the basket and climbs into the driver's seat of Buddy's car and accidentally starts it. With Elmer and Buddy's dog Happy driving away, Buddy and Cookie attempt to save them in the baby carriage. Musical Score by Norman Spencer and Bernard Brown
67	19	I've Got to Sing a Torch Song	MM	Tom Palmer	Jack King	N/A (one-shot cartoon)	September 23, 1933	DVD: Golden Collection: Vol. 5
Many 1930s celebrity caricatures and the Statue of Liberty sing the title song around the world. Musical Score by Norman Spencer and Bernard Brown
68	20	Buddy's Beer Garden	LT	Earl Duvall	Jack King & Frank Tashlin	Buddy; Cookie	November 11, 1933	DVD: Golden Collection: Vol. 6
Buddy and Cookie run a beer garden selling beers, pretzels, and other food items. Various performances are shown on a stage. Musical Score by Norman Spencer
69	21	Buddy's Show Boat	LT	Earl Duvall	Jack King & Jim Pabian	Buddy; Cookie	December 9, 1933	N/A
Buddy sails his show boat while various performances are held on it. Musical Score by Bernard Brown
70	22	Sittin' on a Backyard Fence	MM	Earl Duvall	Jack King & Don Williams	N/A (one-shot cartoon)	December 16, 1933	DVD: Golden Collection: Vol. 6 (extra, unrestored); DVD: Forbidden Hollywood Collection: Vol. 3 (extra, unrestored); Blu-Ray: Footlight Parade (extra, unrestored)
Two cats sing to each other in the middle of the night. Chaos ensues after a rolling pin is thrown at them. Musical Score by Norman Spencer

== 1934 ==
This year marks the beginning of production of cartoons in Cinecolor and 2-strip Technicolor, though only for the Merrie Melodies series. Full Technicolor would not be used until the next year. The Looney Tunes series remains in black-and-white until 1942. For this year, most Merrie Melodies cartoons would still be in black-and-white up until Rhythm in the Bow.

No. overall	No. in year	Title	Series	Directed by	Animated by	Recurring characters	Original release date	Official DVD/Blu-Ray Availability
71	1	Buddy the Gob	LT	Friz Freleng	Jack King & Ben Clopton	Buddy	January 5, 1934	N/A
Buddy is in China to celebrate the 150th anniversary of the Sacred Dragon. Musical Score by Bernard Brown Note: First WB cartoon to credit Friz Freleng as the director.
72	2	Pettin' in the Park	MM	Bernard B. Brown	Jack King & Bob Clampett	N/A (one-shot cartoon)	January 27, 1934	DVD: Gold Diggers of 1933 (extra, unrestored); Blu-Ray: Gold Diggers of 1933 (extra, restored)
Various bird couples pet in the park while singing the title song, and then participate in a diving and swimming contest. Musical Score by Norman Spencer
73	3	Honeymoon Hotel	MM	Earl Duvall	Jack King & Frank Tipper	N/A (one-shot cartoon)	February 17, 1934	Blu-Ray: Collector's Choice: Vol. 3
A couple of lovebugs check in to a hotel on their honeymoon in Bugtown. When the hotel catches fire, the couple manages to escape it and get back home safely before the hotel is completely destroyed. Musical Score by Bernard Brown Note: First color cartoon by Warner Bros.
74	4	Buddy and Towser	LT	Friz Freleng	Jack King & Robert McKimson	Buddy	February 24, 1934	N/A
Buddy and his big dog Towser try to attack a fox that penetrates their property. Musical Score by Norman Spencer
75	5	Buddy's Garage	LT	Earl Duvall	Jack King & Sandy Walker	Buddy; Cookie	April 14, 1934	N/A
Buddy runs a garage that fixes vehicles. When a villain kidnaps Buddy's girlfriend Cookie, Buddy must save her. Musical Score by Bernard Brown
76	6	Beauty and the Beast	MM	Friz Freleng	Jack King & Rollin Hamilton	N/A (one-shot cartoon)	April 14, 1934	Blu-Ray: Collector's Vault: Vol. 1
A young girl eats some fruit and chocolate when the clock strikes ten. A nightmare occurs in the nursery where the girl is kidnapped by the monster from the "Beauty and the Beast" book in Fairytale Land. Musical Score by Norman Spencer Note: Produced in Cinecolor.
77	7	Those Were Wonderful Days	MM	Bernard B. Brown	Paul Smith & Don Williams	N/A (one-shot cartoon)	April 26, 1934	N/A
In 1898, a barbershop quartet plays music on found objects. During the Fourth of July celebration, a hero and a villain fight for the heart of a woman at a local fairground. Musical Score by Norman Spencer
78	8	Buddy's Trolley Troubles	LT	Friz Freleng	Ben Clopton & Frank Tipper	Buddy; Cookie	May 5, 1934	N/A
Buddy drives a trolley and gets passengers on. A prisoner evades the trolley, and it is up to Buddy and Cookie to defeat him. Musical Score by Norman Spencer
79	9	Goin' to Heaven on a Mule	MM	Friz Freleng	Rollin Hamilton & Robert McKimson	N/A (one-shot cartoon)	May 19, 1934	N/A
An extremely lazy man working on a plantation has to choose between good and bad when it comes to alcohol. He dreams about going to heaven on a mule, but while up there, he is kicked down to the underworld with Hades after drinking alcohol from the "forbidden tree". Musical Score by Norman Spencer
80	10	Buddy of the Apes	LT	Ben Hardaway	Paul Smith & Sandy Walker	Buddy	May 26, 1934	N/A
Buddy is in a jungle doing his routines with animals. When a native chief demands the natives to catch Buddy, the animals must work together to save him and defeat the chief. Musical Score by Bernard Brown
81	11	How Do I Know It's Sunday	MM	Friz Freleng	Frank Tipper & Don Williams	N/A (one-shot cartoon)	June 9, 1934	DVD: Golden Collection: Vol. 6 (extra, unrestored)
Products in a general store come to life and sing a song. Musical Score by Bernard Brown
82	12	Buddy's Bearcats	LT	Jack King	Ben Clopton	Buddy; Cookie	June 23, 1934	N/A
Buddy plays a baseball game with his team "Buddy's Bearcats" against the Battling Bruisers. Musical Score by Norman Spencer
83	13	Why Do I Dream Those Dreams	MM	Friz Freleng	Rollin Hamilton & Robert McKimson	N/A (one-shot cartoon)	June 30, 1934	Blu-Ray: Sadie McKee (extra, restored)
A fantasy version of the short story "Rip Van Winkle" involving beer-guzzling leprechauns and other strange creatures. Musical Score by Norman Spencer
84	14	The Girl at the Ironing Board	MM	Friz Freleng	Frank Tipper & Sandy Walker	N/A (one-shot cartoon)	August 23, 1934	N/A
All of the laundry that is washed mysteriously comes to life late at night. Musical Score by Bernard Brown
85	15	The Miller's Daughter	MM	Friz Freleng	Rollin Hamilton & Chuck Jones	N/A (one-shot cartoon)	October 13, 1934	N/A
After the household cat breaks a small ceramic figurine of a young country girl, all of the other ceramic figurines come to life. Musical Score by Norman Spencer
86	16	Shake Your Powder Puff	MM	Friz Freleng	Robert McKimson & Bob Clampett	N/A (one-shot cartoon)	October 17, 1934	Blu-Ray: Collector's Vault: Vol. 3
A bunch of animals put on performances in a barn. When a dog gets thrown out, he plots revenge. Musical Score by Bernard Brown
87	17	Buddy the Detective	LT	Jack King	Paul Smith & Don Williams	Buddy; Cookie	October 17, 1934	N/A
The Mad Musician calls Cookie to come to his house to play instruments. Buddy must solve the mystery of the Musician. Musical Score by Bernard Brown
88	18	Rhythm in the Bow	MM	Ben Hardaway	Rollin Hamilton & Ben Clopton	N/A (one-shot cartoon)	October 20, 1934	N/A
A bunch of hobos are on a train. Musical Score by Norman Spencer
89	19	Buddy the Woodsman	LT	Jack King	Paul Smith & Don Williams	Buddy; Cookie	October 27, 1934	N/A
Buddy is a lumberjack who chops down a tree carrying a nest owned by birds. When a big brown bear enters a dining cabin and scares the men eating the meal that Cookie served, both Buddy and Cookie must scare it away. Musical Score by Bernard Brown
90	20	Buddy's Circus	LT	Jack King	Robert McKimson & Ben Clopton	Buddy	November 8, 1934	DVD: Golden Collection: Vol. 6
Buddy holds a circus where various acts are shown. Musical Score by Norman Spencer
91	21	Those Beautiful Dames	MM	Friz Freleng	Paul Smith & Chuck Jones	N/A (one-shot cartoon)	November 10, 1934	DVD: Dames (extra, unrestored & uncensored)
A poor orphan girl looks at all the pretty toys through a store window on a snowy night. While she sleeps in a cabin during the snowstorm, the toys in the store come to life. Musical Score by Bernard Brown Note: First WB cartoon produced in 2-strip Technicolor.
92	22	Buddy's Adventures	LT	Ben Hardaway	Robert McKimson & Don Williams	Buddy; Cookie	November 17, 1934	N/A
Buddy and Cookie fly in a hot air balloon until a thunderstorm causes them to land in "Sourtown". When Buddy and Cookie try to entertain the locals with a singing and dancing performance, they get arrested and are led to the town's crabby king. Buddy attempts to introduce the joy of music to the royal court. Musical Score by Bernard Brown
93	23	Pop Goes Your Heart	MM	Friz Freleng	Frank Tipper & Sandy Walker	N/A (one-shot cartoon)	December 8, 1934	Blu-Ray: Sadie McKee (extra, restored)
When spring comes to the woods, forest animals go about their business. A bear scares all but one of the beavers away, and then trips over a fence while trying to shoo the bees away before running away covered in hay. Musical Score by Norman Spencer Note: Produced in 2-strip Technicolor.
94	24	Viva Buddy	LT	Jack King	Frank Tipper & Cal Dalton	Buddy; Cookie	December 12, 1934	N/A
Buddy and Cookie are in Mexico. Musical Score by Norman Spencer
95	25	Buddy the Dentist	LT	Ben Hardaway	Rollin Hamilton & Jack King	Buddy; Cookie	December 15, 1934	N/A
Buddy prepares fudge for his girlfriend Cookie, but his dog Bozo spills it on the floor, eats it and gets a cavity in his teeth. So Buddy tries to pull the damaged tooth out. Musical Score by Norman Spencer

== 1935 ==
No. overall	No. in year	Title	Series	Directed by	Animated by	Recurring characters	Original release date	Official DVD/Blu-Ray Availability
96	1	Mr. and Mrs. Is the Name	MM	Friz Freleng	Ben Clopton & Cal Dalton	Buddy; Cookie	January 19, 1935	Blu-Ray: Collector's Choice: Vol. 3
Buddy and Cookie are mer-kids living in the sea. Musical Score by Bernard Brown
97	2	Country Boy	MM	Friz Freleng	Robert McKimson & Paul Smith	Peter Rabbit	February 9, 1935	Blu-Ray: Collector's Vault: Vol. 2
Peter Rabbit sneaks into a garden while his siblings go to school. Musical Score by Norman Spencer
98	3	I Haven't Got a Hat	MM	Friz Freleng	Rollin Hamilton & Jack KIng	Porky Pig; Beans; Little Kitty; Ham and Ex; Oliver Owl	March 2, 1935	DVD: Golden Collection: Vol. 3 DVD: Porky Pig 101
In a parody of the Our Gang live-action series of shorts, schoolteacher Miss Cud introduces a school musical and recital, including Porky Pig (in his debut) stuttering "Paul Revere's Ride", Little Kitty forgetting her lines to "Mary Had a Little Lamb", and Ham and Ex singing "I Haven't Got a Hat". Meanwhile, Beans the Cat gets furious over Oliver Owl, including putting an unnamed dog and cat inside the piano. Musical Score by Bernard Brown
99	4	Buddy's Pony Express	LT	Ben Hardaway	Ben Clopton & Cal Dalton	Buddy; Cookie	March 9, 1935	N/A
Buddy participates in a horse race in the Old West. Musical Score by Bernard Brown
100	5	Buddy's Theatre	LT	Ben Hardaway	Don Williams & Sandy Walker	Buddy; Cookie	April 1, 1935	N/A
Buddy sells tickets at a movie theater, and sets up the film reels in the auditorium. The things on the screen are a newsreel, a trailer for an upcoming event, and the main feature starring Cookie called "The Chinchilla". Musical Score by Norman Spencer
101	6	Along Flirtation Walk	MM	Friz Freleng	Robert McKimson & Paul Smith	N/A (one-shot cartoon)	April 6, 1935	N/A
On the night before a football game, anthropomorphic chicken students dance to a musical number at Plymouth Rock College. The college faces off against Rhode Island Red University. Musical Score by Norman Spencer
102	7	Buddy of the Legion	LT	Ben Hardaway	Bob Clampett & Chuck Jones	Buddy	April 6, 1935	N/A
While cleaning a bookstore, Buddy finds a book about the Foreign Legion and dreams that he is the leader of the Legion. Musical Score by Bernard Brown
103	8	My Green Fedora	MM	Friz Freleng	Bob Clampett & Chuck Jones	Peter Rabbit	May 4, 1935	Blu-Ray: Collector's Vault: Vol. 3
Peter Rabbit is assigned by his mother to babysit his baby brother Elmer. After the things Peter tries fail to stop Elmer from crying, Peter dresses in some old clothes, including a green fedora. When a weasel kidnaps Elmer, Peter must save him. Musical Score by Bernard Brown
104	9	Buddy's Lost World	LT	Jack King	Rollin Hamilton & Sandy Walker	Buddy	May 18, 1935	N/A
Buddy and his dog Bozo go into a prehistoric world of dinosaurs and cave people. Musical Score by Norman Spencer
105	10	Into Your Dance	MM	Friz Freleng	Ben Clopton & Cal Dalton	N/A (one-shot cartoon)	June 8, 1935	DVD: Annie Oakley (extra, unrestored)
A concert is held on Captain Benny's show boat. Musical Score by Norman Spencer
106	11	Buddy's Bug Hunt	LT	Jack King	Robert McKimson & Paul Smith	Buddy	June 22, 1935	N/A
Buddy is a bug catcher catching various insects. Musical Score by Norman Spencer
107	12	Buddy in Africa	LT	Ben Hardaway	Don Williams & Jack Carr	Buddy	July 6, 1935	N/A
Buddy is in Africa selling goods to natives and trying to overcome a gorilla. Musical Score by Norman Spencer
108	13	The Country Mouse	MM	Friz Freleng	Don Williams & Jack Carr	N/A (one-shot cartoon)	July 13, 1935	Blu-Ray/DVD: Mouse Chronicles (extra, unrestored); Blu-Ray: Collector's Vault: Vol. 3 (restored)
A mouse named Elmer wants to be a wrestler, but his grandmother tells him not to sneak out of his house. Musical Score by Bernard Brown
109	14	Buddy Steps Out	LT	Jack King	Bob Clampett & Chuck Jones	Buddy; Cookie	July 20, 1935	N/A
While Buddy and Cookie go out on a date, things in Cookie's house come to life. Musical Score by Bernard Brown
110	15	The Merry Old Soul	MM	Friz Freleng	Rollin Hamilton & Riley Thomson	N/A (one-shot cartoon)	August 2, 1935	N/A
After Old King Cole and the Woman in the Shoe get married, they take care of a large number of children. Musical Score by Norman Spencer
111	16	Buddy the Gee Man	LT	Jack King	Sandy Walker & Cal Dalton	Buddy	August 24, 1935	DVD: G Men (extra, unrestored)
Buddy is a federal agent who works at a jail. Musical Score by Norman Spencer
112	17	The Lady in Red	MM	Friz Freleng	Robert McKimson & Ben Clopton	N/A (one-shot cartoon)	September 7, 1935	Blu-Ray: Joe's Apartment (extra, restored)
A Mexican cafeteria is overrun by cockroaches while the owner Manuel is out. Musical Score by Bernard Brown
113	18	A Cartoonist's Nightmare	LT	Jack King	Don Williams & Paul Smith	Beans	September 14, 1935	DVD: Golden Collection: Vol. 6
An animation studio is closing for the day, but one animator needs to finish a drawing featuring Beans the Cat. In the animator's nightmare, Beans attempts to help him defeat a goblin. Musical Score by Bernard Brown
114	19	The Little Dutch Plate	MM	Friz Freleng	Paul Smith & Bob Clampett	N/A (one-shot cartoon)	October 19, 1935	N/A
Things in a Dutch Kitchen come to life, including a girl on a plate, and a salt shaker boy. When the clock strikes midnight, the girl gets taken inside the clock and the boy must rescue her. Musical Score by Norman Spencer
115	20	Hollywood Capers	LT	Jack King	Rollin Hamilton & Chuck Jones	Beans; Little Kitty; Oliver Owl; Porky Pig (cameo)	October 19, 1935	DVD: Golden Collection: Vol. 3
Beans the Cat sneaks into a sound stage at a Hollywood film studio where Oliver Owl is directing a film starring Little Kitty. When Beans activates a Frankenstein-esque robot, chaos ensues and Beans must destroy it. Musical Score by Norman Spencer
116	21	Gold Diggers of '49	LT	Tex Avery	Bob Clampett & Chuck Jones	Porky Pig; Beans; Little Kitty	November 2, 1935	DVD: Golden Collection: Vol. 5 DVD: Porky Pig 101
Beans the Cat and Porky Pig go hunting for gold. Musical Score by Bernard Brown
117	22	Billboard Frolics	MM	Friz Freleng	Cal Dalton & Sandy Walker	N/A (one-shot cartoon)	November 16, 1935	Blu-Ray: Collector's Vault: Vol. 3
Billboards and signs come to life singing and dancing to the song "Merrily We Roll Along". A cat chases a chick interacting with the environment, and other advertisements rally to protect the chick. Musical Score by Bernard Brown
118	23	Flowers for Madame	MM	Friz Freleng	Paul Smith & Don Williams	N/A (one-shot cartoon)	November 20, 1935	N/A
Flowers come to life in a garden. When a match is burned by a magnifying glass, a fire starts and the flowers and snails escape. Musical Score by Norman Spencer Note: First WB cartoon produced in 3-strip Technicolor.

== 1936 ==
This year, the Merrie Melodies series adopts the iconic bullseye rings in its opening and closing titles alongside a script "That's all Folks!" text.

No. overall	No. in year	Title	Series	Directed by	Animated by	Recurring characters	Original release date	Official DVD/Blu-Ray Availability
119	1	I Wanna Play House	MM	Friz Freleng	Cal Dalton & Sandy Walker	N/A (one-shot cartoon)	January 11, 1936	N/A
Two bear cubs, one brown and one black sneak away from Papa Bear to play hide and seek. The black cub goes into a Gypsy trailer and gets drunk on cider. The little bears' harmless hijinks soon turn into danger on the runaway wagon. Musical Score by Bernard Brown
120	2	The Phantom Ship	LT	Jack King	Paul Smith & Don Williams	Beans; Ham and Ex	February 1, 1936	Blu-Ray: The Devil Doll (extra, restored)
Beans the Cat flies to the Arctic with Ham and Ex on an aircraft. While exploring a frozen ship, Beans finds and defrosts a couple of frozen buccaneers who chase him and Ham and Ex who land back in the plane and take off. Beans then dodges an explosive powder keg and is launched into the air and caught by Ham and Ex before they fly home. Musical Score by Bernard Brown
121	3	The Cat Came Back	MM	Friz Freleng	Ben Clopton & Robert McKimson	N/A (one-shot cartoon)	February 8, 1936	Blu-Ray: The Walking Dead (extra, restored)
A curious kitten plays with an equally curious little mouse from across the hall, despite both being told by their mothers how bad the other's family is. Musical Score by Norman Spencer
122	4	Boom Boom	LT	Jack King	Cal Dalton & Sandy Walker	Porky Pig; Beans	February 29, 1936	DVD: Porky Pig 101
Beans the Cat and Porky Pig are soldiers who are sent to a battlefield. After reading a message from General Hardtack, who is held by enemy forces, Beans and Porky set off to rescue him. Musical Score by Norman Spencer
123	5	Miss Glory	MM	Tex Avery (uncredited)	N/A	N/A (one-shot cartoon)	March 7, 1936	DVD: Golden Collection: Vol. 6 Blu-Ray/DVD: Platinum Collection: Vol. 2
Locals prepare to welcome Miss Glory in Hicksville. Screenplay and lyrics by Harry Warren & Al Dubin
124	6	Alpine Antics	LT	Jack King	Riley Thomson & Jack Carr	Porky Pig; Beans; Little Kitty	March 9, 1936	DVD: Golden Collection: Vol. 5 DVD: Porky Pig 101
Beans the Cat and Porky Pig participate in a skiing contest. Musical Score by Norman Spencer
125	7	The Fire Alarm	LT	Jack King	Ben Clopton & Robert McKimson	Beans; Ham and Ex	March 9, 1936	N/A
Ham and Ex play at a fire station. Musical Score by Norman Spencer
126	8	The Blow Out	LT	Tex Avery	Chuck Jones & Sid Sutherland	Porky Pig	April 4, 1936	DVD: Porky Pig 101
The Mad Bomber has planned to blow up the entire city by placing time bombs in various buildings. Porky Pig must stop him in hopes for receiving money for ice cream sodas at an ice cream parlor. Musical Score by Bernard Brown
127	9	I'm a Big Shot Now	MM	Friz Freleng	Riley Thomson & Jack Carr	N/A (one-shot cartoon)	April 11, 1936	DVD: Bullets or Ballots (extra, unrestored)
A gangster bird likes to prove his toughness by beating up on the police without the slightest provocation. Musical Score by Bernard Brown
128	10	Westward Whoa	LT	Jack King	Paul Smith & Ben Clopton	Porky Pig; Beans; Little Kitty; Ham and Ex	April 25, 1936	DVD: Porky Pig 101
A Western adaptation of "The Boy Who Cried Wolf" where Ham and Ex make Indian charge calls and Native Americans come out of the woods. Musical Score by Norman Spencer
129	11	Plane Dippy	LT	Tex Avery	Sid Sutherland & Virgil Ross	Porky Pig	April 30, 1936	DVD: Porky Pig 101
Porky Pig applies for a job at the military. After failing a series of tests, he is sent on a wild ride in a voice-activated plane. Musical Score by Bernard Brown
130	12	Let It Be Me	MM	Friz Freleng	Robert McKimson & Don Williams	Emily the Chicken	May 2, 1936	Blu-Ray: Collector's Vault: Vol. 1
Emily the Chicken decides to go on a date with Mr. Bingo over Clem the Rooster. Musical Score by Bernard Brown
131	13	I'd Love to Take Orders from You	MM	Tex Avery	Bob Clampett & Cecil Surry	N/A (one-shot cartoon)	May 16, 1936	Blu-Ray: Collector's Vault: Vol. 1
Father Scarecrow works hard all day in the cornfield. When the much smaller, Junior Scarecrow attempts to fill his father's shoes, his lack of size and intimidation skills render his scare tactics fruitless until, unbeknownst to Junior, Father gets his back. When Junior boasts of his supposed success to Mother Scarecrow, Father reminds son that Junior's not quite grown just yet. Musical Score by Norman Spencer
132	14	Fish Tales	LT	Jack King	Robert McKimson & Don Williams	Porky Pig	May 23, 1936	DVD: Porky Pig 101
After catching a bunch of fish, Porky Pig has a dream where a fish catches him and tries to cook him for dinner. Musical Score by Norman Spencer
133	15	Bingo Crosbyana	MM	Friz Freleng	Cal Dalton & Sandy Walker	N/A (one-shot cartoon)	May 30, 1936	DVD: Swing Time (extra, unrestored)
A group of fun-loving insects have taken over a kitchen. The female insects promptly become enthralled by a crooning show-off of a fly, Bingo Crosbyana, who incurs the jealous resentment of their boyfriends. When a spider invades the kitchen, Bingo hides in a roll of wax paper, and the male insects team up to trap the spider on a sheet of fly paper. Musical Score by Norman Spencer
134	16	Shanghaied Shipmates	LT	Jack King	Paul Smith & Joe D'Igalo	Porky Pig	June 20, 1936	DVD: Porky Pig 101
Porky Pig and his fellow shipmates are at a bar on a ship. They are forced to become part of the crew by a pirate captain who treats them poorly. After a week, the crew starts a mutiny. The captain attempts to stop them with his cannon, but it backfires and he is sent into the explosives store where all of the explosives kill him. Musical Score by Norman Spencer
135	17	When I Yoo Hoo	MM	Friz Freleng	Robert McKimson & Don Williams	N/A (one-shot cartoon)	June 27, 1936	N/A
The Weavers and the Matthews fight against each other. Musical Score by Norman Spencer
136	18	Porky's Pet	LT	Jack King	Cal Dalton & Sandy Walker	Porky Pig	July 11, 1936	DVD: Porky Pig 101
Porky Pig receives an offer from a big shot producer for him and his pet ostrich Lulu to be in his show. Porky and Lulu evade a "no pets" policy in a train, and eventually ride a handcar to the city. Musical Score by Norman Spencer
137	19	I Love to Singa	MM	Tex Avery	Chuck Jones & Virgil Ross	Owl Jolson; Jack Bunny	July 18, 1936	DVD: Golden Collection: Vol. 2 Blu-Ray/DVD: Platinum Collection: Vol. 1
Owl Jolson wants to sing jazz instead of classical music. Musical Score by Norman Spencer
138	20	Porky the Rain-Maker	LT	Tex Avery	Cecil Surry & Sid Sutherland	Porky Pig; Phineas Pig	August 1, 1936	DVD: Porky Pig 101
Porky Pig's family's farm animals are hungry, but when Porky buys weather pills instead of animal feed, his father Phineas gets angry and throws them, which spill all over. The animals gobble up the pills and "weather" the consequences. A duck snaps a rain pill and spits it into the sky to make it rain. Musical Score by Norman Spencer
139	21	Sunday Go to Meetin' Time	MM	Friz Freleng	Robert McKimson & Don Williams	N/A (one-shot cartoon)	August 8, 1936	N/A
Nicodemus tries to steal chickens and dreams of being sent to hell. Musical Score by Norman Spencer Note: One of the Censored Eleven.
140	22	Porky's Poultry Plant	LT	Frank Tashlin	Don Williams & Volney White	Porky Pig	August 22, 1936	DVD: Golden Collection: Vol. 4 DVD: Porky Pig 101
Porky Pig runs a poultry plant where he feeds food to chickens, ducks and geese. When a chickenhawk steals some of the birds, Porky sets off on his plane to rescue them. Musical Score by Carl W. Stalling
141	23	At Your Service Madame	MM	Friz Freleng	Don Williams & Cal Dalton	W.C. Squeals; Piggy Hamhock	August 29, 1936	N/A
A widow pig receives unwanted attention from W.C. Squeals, who finds a newspaper with an article about her inheritance. While Squeals attempts to steal money from her safe, Piggy Hamhock and his siblings make it difficult for him to succeed, eventually making him lose. Musical Score by Norman Spencer
142	24	Porky's Moving Day	LT	Jack King	Paul Smith & Joe D'Igalo	Porky Pig	September 12, 1936	DVD: Porky Pig 101
Porky Pig's moving company is called by a woman, whose house is about to fall off a cliff and into the sea. Musical Score by Carl W. Stalling
143	25	Toy Town Hall	MM	Friz Freleng	Robert McKimson & Sandy Walker	N/A (one-shot cartoon)	September 19, 1936	DVD: Shall We Dance (extra, unrestored); Blu-Ray: The Great Ziegfeld (extra, restored)
A young boy's toys come to life at night and put on a musical version of Fred Allen's Town Hall Tonight. Musical Score by Carl W. Stalling
144	26	Milk and Money	LT	Tex Avery	Chuck Jones & Virgil Ross	Porky Pig; Phineas Pig	October 3, 1936	DVD: Golden Collection: Vol. 5 DVD: Porky Pig 101
Porky Pig and his father Phineas are doing different jobs on the farm, including ploughing with their horse Dobbin. Hank Horsefly disturbs them, and Mr. Viper the snake wants to evict Porky and Phineas. Musical Score by Carl W. Stalling
145	27	Boulevardier from the Bronx	MM	Friz Freleng	Paul Smith & Cal Dalton	Emily the Chicken	October 10, 1936	Blu-Ray: Collector's Vault: Vol. 2
A team of chickens, including Dizzy Dan and Emily's boyfriend Claude, play a baseball game in Hickville. Musical Score by Carl W. Stalling Note: First cartoon to use the "Merrily We Roll Along" opening theme.
146	28	Don't Look Now	MM	Tex Avery	Bob Clampett & Joe D'Igalo	N/A (one-shot cartoon)	November 7, 1936	Blu-Ray: Collector's Vault: Vol. 3
On Valentine's Day, Cupid makes people fall in love, while Satan does everything possible to undermine the relationships. Musical Score by Carl W. Stalling
147	29	Little Beau Porky	LT	Frank Tashlin	Robert Bentley & Nelson Demorest	Porky Pig	November 14, 1936	DVD: Golden Collection: Vol. 4 DVD: Porky Pig 101
Porky Pig is in the French Foreign Legion as a camel scrubber, but after fighting off the enemy, ends up as Commandant. Musical Score by Carl W. Stalling
148	30	The CooCoo Nut Grove	MM	Friz Freleng	Robert McKimson & Sandy Walker	Ben Birdie; W.C. Squeals (cameo)	November 28, 1936	DVD: Golden Collection: Vol. 3
Many caricatures of Hollywood stars hold performances at the CooCoo Nut Groove. Musical Score by Carl W. Stalling
149	31	The Village Smithy	LT	Tex Avery	Cecil Surry & Sid Sutherland	Porky Pig	December 5, 1936	DVD: Porky Pig 101
Based on the poem "The Village Blacksmith", Porky Pig gives the blacksmith a rubber horseshoe, and then a hot horseshoe on the back of the horse by accident. Musical Score by Carl W. Stalling
150	32	Porky in the North Woods	LT	Frank Tashlin	Volney White & Norman McCabe	Porky Pig	December 19, 1936	DVD: Golden Collection: Vol. 4 DVD: Porky Pig 101
Porky Pig has to combat a rough French Canadian who causes havoc in the North Woods, including setting the forest on fire, and trapping innocent forest animals. Musical Score by Carl W. Stalling

== 1937 ==
Starting this year, Carl W. Stalling would be the composer on almost every cartoon until To Itch His Own in 1958.

No. overall	No. in year	Title	Series	Directed by	Animated by	Recurring characters	Original release date	Official DVD/Blu-Ray Availability
151	1	He Was Her Man	MM	Friz Freleng	Paul Smith & Cal Dalton	N/A (one-shot cartoon)	January 2, 1937	N/A
After a mistreated female mouse finds that her husband has left home for another female mouse, she attempts to get him back.
152	2	Porky the Wrestler	LT	Tex Avery	Chuck Jones & Elmer Wait	Porky Pig	January 9, 1937	DVD: Porky Pig 101
Porky Pig travels to a wrestling match with the wrestling champ.
153	3	Pigs Is Pigs	MM	Friz Freleng	Robert McKimson & Paul Smith	Piggy Hamhock	January 30, 1937	DVD: Golden Collection: Vol. 3
Piggy Hamhock, who always feels hungry, is scolded by his mother for his bad eating habits, fearing he would explode if they continue.
154	4	Porky's Road Race	LT	Frank Tashlin	Robert Bentley & Joe D'Igalo	Porky Pig	February 7, 1937	DVD: Golden Collection: Vol. 3 DVD: Porky Pig 101
Porky Pig participates in a car race against many celebrity caricatures.
155	5	Picador Porky	LT	Tex Avery	Chuck Jones & Sid Sutherland	Porky Pig	February 27, 1937	DVD: Porky Pig 101
Porky Pig participates in a bullfight in Mexico.
156	6	I Only Have Eyes For You	MM	Tex Avery	Bob Clampett & Volney White	N/A (one-shot cartoon)	February 27, 1937	Blu-Ray: Collector's Choice: Vol. 3
An ice delivery bird is wooed by a spinster bird, while the Iceman wants Katie Canary who rebuffs his overtures, as she has dreams of marrying a radio crooner.
157	7	The Fella with the Fiddle	MM	Friz Freleng	Cal Dalton & Ken Harris	N/A (one-shot cartoon)	March 27, 1937	N/A
J. Field Mouse tells his grandchildren the story of a mouse with a fiddle whose greed and dishonesty became his undoing.
158	8	Porky's Romance	LT	Frank Tashlin	Robert Bentley & Joe D'Igalo	Porky Pig; Petunia Pig	April 3, 1937	DVD: Golden Collection: Vol. 3 DVD: Porky Pig 101
Porky Pig buys gifts for his girlfriend Petunia (in her debut), but when he arrives at her house, she is disgusted to see him and sends him home. Porky dreams of marrying Petunia and doing chores while she is a couch potato.
159	9	She Was an Acrobat's Daughter	MM	Friz Freleng	Robert McKimson & A.C. Gamer	N/A (one-shot cartoon)	April 10, 1937	DVD: Golden Collection: Vol. 3
A local movie theater shows two newsreels, a sing-along to the title song, and the main feature film, The Petrified Florist. A baby goose annoys his father and ruins the movie in the projection room.
160	10	Porky's Duck Hunt	LT	Tex Avery	Virgil Ross & Robert Cannon	Daffy Duck; Porky Pig	April 17, 1937	DVD: The Essential Daffy Duck; DVD: Porky Pig 101; Blu-Ray: Collector's Vault: Vol. 1
Porky Pig prepares for duck hunting, but encounters numerous mishaps, including Daffy Duck (then unnamed upon his debut) repeatedly tricking him.
161	11	Ain't We Got Fun	MM	Tex Avery	Chuck Jones & Bob Clampett	N/A (one-shot cartoon)	May 1, 1937	DVD: The Life of Emile Zola (extra, unrestored)
A cat is tricked by a group of fun-loving mice into taking the blame for the mess they created and gets thrown out of the house into the snow by his cantankerous old owner.
162	12	Porky and Gabby	LT	Ub Iwerks	Chuck Jones & Bob Clampett	Porky Pig; Gabby Goat	May 15, 1937	DVD: Porky Pig 101
Porky Pig and Gabby Goat's camping trip is foiled by car trouble.
163	13	Clean Pastures	MM	Friz Freleng	Paul Smith & Phil Monroe	N/A (one-shot cartoon)	May 22, 1937	N/A
Angelic caricatures of African Americans go from Heaven to Harlem to get people to paradise. Note: One of the Censored Eleven.
164	14	Uncle Tom's Bungalow	MM	Tex Avery	Sid Sutherland & Virgil Ross	N/A (one-shot cartoon)	June 5, 1937	N/A
A parody of the 1852 novel Uncle Tom's Cabin and of the "plantation melodrama" genre of the 1930s. Note: One of the Censored Eleven.
165	15	Porky's Building	LT	Frank Tashlin	Volney White & Norman McCabe	Porky Pig; Dirty Digg	June 19, 1937	DVD: Porky Pig 101 (unrestored); Blu-Ray: It's Love I'm After (extra, restored)
Porky Pig and Dirty Digg, two building contractors, are in a war for the deal to build the town hall. Both of them offer low fees, and the mayor proclaims that they will both get to build their buildings, but whoever finishes first will get the contract.
166	16	Streamlined Greta Green	MM	Friz Freleng	Cal Dalton & Ken Harris	N/A (one-shot cartoon)	June 19, 1937	Blu-Ray: Collector's Choice: Vol. 4
In a town of anthropomorphic vehicles, a young male car dreams of being a taxi. When he is told by his mother about school, he goes into the big city instead.
167	17	Sweet Sioux	MM	Friz Freleng	Robert McKimson & A.C. Gamer	N/A (one-shot cartoon)	June 26, 1937	N/A
An Indian take on the American West.
168	18	Porky's Super Service	LT	Ub Iwerks	Chuck Jones & Bob Clampett	Porky Pig	July 3, 1937	DVD: Porky Pig 101
While working at a gas station, Porky Pig has to deal with a bratty baby dog that won't stop bothering him.
169	19	Egghead Rides Again	MM	Tex Avery	Paul Smith & Irven Spence	Egghead	July 17, 1937	Blu-Ray: Collector's Choice: Vol. 3
After Egghead (in his debut) gets kicked out of his house, he applies to be a "cow-puncher".
170	20	Porky's Badtime Story	LT	Bob Clampett (Note: Planned by Ub Iwerks, but was uncredited.)	Chuck Jones	Porky Pig; Gabby Goat	July 24, 1937	DVD: Porky Pig 101 (unrestored); Blu-Ray: It's Love I'm After (extra, restored)
Porky Pig and Gabby Goat are warned by their boss that if they oversleep one more time, they will be fired. They try to go to sleep at 8 p.m., but various things keep happening to them.
171	21	Plenty of Money and You	MM	Friz Freleng	Cal Dalton & Phil Monroe	N/A (one-shot cartoon)	July 31, 1937	DVD: Gold Diggers of 1937 (extra, unrestored); Blu-Ray: The Prince and the Pauper (extra, restored)
One of the hen's eggs is revealed to be an ostrich who causes chaos.
172	22	Porky's Railroad	LT	Frank Tashlin	Robert Bentley & Joe D'Igalo	Porky Pig; Dirty Digg	August 7, 1937	DVD: Golden Collection: Vol. 4 DVD: Porky Pig 101
Porky Pig and his 2-2-2 typed locomotive (#13 1/2 "Toots") travel the "15th Century Unlimited" and endure a larger streamliner and stubborn bull who crosses the tracks.
173	23	A Sunbonnet Blue	MM	Tex Avery	Sid Sutherland & Virgil Ross	N/A (one-shot cartoon)	August 21, 1937	Blu-Ray: The Prince and the Pauper (extra, restored)
After the "Snobby Hatte Shoppe" closes for the night, mice from a hole have a party at the closed store.
174	24	Get Rich Quick Porky	LT	Bob Clampett	Chuck Jones	Porky Pig; Gabby Goat	August 28, 1937	DVD: Porky Pig 101
A dog-faced con artist named John Gusher gives Porky Pig and Gabby Goat a job to make oil.
175	25	Speaking of the Weather	MM	Frank Tashlin	Joe D'Igalo & Volney White	N/A (one-shot cartoon)	September 4, 1937	DVD: Golden Collection: Vol. 3
Characters from books and magazines come to life in a closed drugstore at midnight.
176	26	Porky's Garden	LT	Tex Avery	Sid Sutherland & Elmer Wait	Porky Pig	September 11, 1937	DVD: Porky Pig 101
An agricultural farm is giving prizes for the person who makes the largest homegrown project. Porky Pig and a rival neighbor both plan to win the agricultural farm prize, Porky with his garden and the neighbor with his chickens. After the chickens dislike the neighbor's feed, they eat all of the things in Porky's garden except for his pumpkin.
177	27	Dog Daze	MM	Friz Freleng	Robert McKimson & A.C. Gamer	N/A (one-shot cartoon)	September 18, 1937	Blu-Ray: Rover Dangerfield (extra, restored)
Various dogs participate in a dog show.
178	28	I Wanna Be a Sailor	MM	Tex Avery	Paul Smith & Virgil Ross	N/A (one-shot cartoon)	September 25, 1937	Blu-Ray: Collector's Choice: Vol. 2
Peter Parrot wants to be a sailor instead of having a cracker.
179	29	Rover's Rival	LT	Bob Clampett	Chuck Jones	Porky Pig	October 9, 1937	DVD: Porky Pig 101
Porky Pig teaches his dog Rover some tricks. Meanwhile, a rival puppy wants to kill Porky. Note: First cartoon to use "The Merry-Go-Round Broke Down" as its opening and closing theme and the drum ending card with Porky Pig saying "That's all Folks!".
180	30	The Lyin' Mouse	MM	Friz Freleng	Ken Harris	N/A (one-shot cartoon)	October 16, 1937	Blu-Ray/DVD: Mouse Chronicles (extra, unrestored); Blu-Ray: Collector's Vault: Vol. 3 (restored)
A gray mouse tells a cat the story of The Lion and the Mouse. Story by Tedd Pierce
181	31	The Case of the Stuttering Pig	LT	Frank Tashlin	Volney White	Porky Pig; Petunia Pig	October 30, 1937	DVD: Golden Collection: Vol. 4 DVD: Porky Pig 101
Porky Pig and his siblings learn of their inheritance from their late uncle Solomon. However, their seemingly benevolent lawyer, Goodwill, drinks a Jekyll and Hyde potion that transforms into a monster who kidnaps everyone except Porky. Story by Melvin Millar
182	32	Little Red Walking Hood	MM	Tex Avery	Irven Spence	Elmer Fudd	November 6, 1937	DVD: Golden Collection: Vol. 5
An adaptation of "Little Red Riding Hood" with Elmer Fudd (then unnamed upon his debut). Story by Cal Howard
183	33	Porky's Double Trouble	LT	Frank Tashlin	Joe D'Igalo	Porky Pig; Petunia Pig	November 13, 1937	DVD: Golden Collection: Vol. 5 DVD: Porky Pig 101
A killer pig kidnaps Porky and disguises himself as the bank teller that Porky is. Porky's girlfriend Petunia, who discovers Porky has been kidnapped, decides to go out with the killer. Story by George Manuell
184	34	The Woods Are Full of Cuckoos	MM	Frank Tashlin	Robert Bentley	Ben Birdie; Jack Bunny; W.C. Field Mouse	December 4, 1937	DVD: Golden Collection: Vol. 3
Many forest animal caricatures of celebrities sing the title song in different styles during the "Woodland Community Swing Variety Show". Story by Melvin Millar
185	35	Porky's Hero Agency	LT	Bob Clampett	Chuck Jones	Porky Pig	December 4, 1937	DVD: Porky Pig 101 (unrestored); Blu-Ray: Marked Woman (extra, restored)
Porky Pig reads a Greek myth about a woman who turned everyone she looked at into stone. When he goes to bed, he dreams of being a Greek hero named "Porkykarkus", who tries to defeat the Gorgons.
186	36	September in the Rain	MM	Friz Freleng	Cal Dalton	N/A (one-shot cartoon)	December 18, 1937	DVD: Carefree (extra, unrestored & censored)
On a rainy evening, product logos come to life. Story by Tedd Pierce

== 1938 ==
No. overall	No. in year	Title	Series	Directed by	Animated by	Recurring characters	Original release date	Official DVD/Blu-Ray Availability
187	1	Daffy Duck & Egghead	MM	Tex Avery	Volney White	Daffy Duck; Egghead	January 1, 1938	DVD: Golden Collection: Vol. 3 DVD: The Essential Daffy Duck; Blu-Ray: Collector's Vault: Vol. 1
Daffy Duck has a battle with Egghead. Story by Ben Hardaway
188	2	Porky's Poppa	LT	Bob Clampett	Chuck Jones	Porky Pig; Phineas Pig	January 15, 1938	DVD: Golden Collection: Vol. 5 DVD: Porky Pig 101
Phineas Pig's cow stops producing milk, forcing him to buy an Acme Creamlined Cow.
189	3	My Little Buckaroo	MM	Friz Freleng	Robert McKimson	N/A (one-shot cartoon)	January 29, 1938	N/A
A sheriff pig tries to catch a thief who stole a townsfolk's possessions. Story by Tedd Pierce
190	4	Porky at the Crocadero	LT	Frank Tashlin	Volney White	Porky Pig	February 5, 1938	DVD: Golden Collection: Vol. 5 DVD: Porky Pig 101
While at the Crocadero night club, Porky Pig dreams of becoming a bandleader, but he finds out that he has no money. Instead he gets a job at the club working on the dishes. His boss gets the wrong idea of Porky involving a fly and fires him. The boss's bandleaders don't show up, so he brings Porky back and has him impersonate several famous bandleaders. Story by Lew Landsman
191	5	Jungle Jitters	MM	Friz Freleng	Phil Monroe	N/A (one-shot cartoon)	February 19, 1938	N/A
A primitive tribe of Africans live in a modern-day jungle. A dog-faced salesman named Elmer comes by to offer them the latest in "assorted useful, useless, utensils". Story by George Manuell Note: One of the Censored Eleven.
192	6	What Price Porky	LT	Bob Clampett	Chuck Jones & Robert Cannon	Daffy Duck; Porky Pig	February 26, 1938	DVD: Golden Collection: Vol. 5 DVD: Porky Pig 101
When Porky Pig goes to feed his chickens, a group of ducks steal the corn he sets out. After sending a document filled with insults from the ducks' "ducktator" (Daffy Duck, as "General Quacko"), war erupts between the chickens and the ducks.
193	7	The Sneezing Weasel	MM	Tex Avery	Sid Sutherland	N/A (one-shot cartoon)	March 12, 1938	Blu-Ray: Collector's Choice: Vol. 4
A brown chick named Wilbur gets a cold after catching a worm in the rain. He sneezes on Willy the weasel, who pretends to be a doctor. Story by Cal Howard
194	8	Porky's Phoney Express	LT	Cal Howard & Cal Dalton	Herman Cohen	Porky Pig	March 19, 1938	DVD: Porky Pig 101
While sweeping the floors at a mail depot, Porky Pig is told by his boss to deliver mail to Red Gulch. Porky rides his horse there, but Indians follow him. Story by Melvin Millar
195	9	A Star Is Hatched	MM	Friz Freleng	Robert McKimson	Emily the Chicken	April 2, 1938	Blu-Ray: Collector's Vault: Vol. 3
Emily the Chicken reads a movie magazine and goes to Hollywood to find the "Megaphone" man. Story by Tedd Pierce
196	10	Porky's Five & Ten	LT	Bob Clampett	Chuck Jones & John Carey	Porky Pig	April 16, 1938	DVD: Porky Pig 101 (unrestored); Blu-Ray: The Shining Hour (extra, restored)
Porky Pig sets sail for the Boola-Boola islands in the South Seas with a sailboat full of cargo and plans to open a five and dime store, until a swordfish cuts a hole in the hull.
197	11	The Penguin Parade	MM	Tex Avery	Paul Smith	N/A (one-shot cartoon)	April 23, 1938	Blu-Ray: Collector's Choice: Vol. 2
A nightclub for penguins called "The Club Iceberg" is held in the Arctic. Story by Ben Hardaway Screenplay and lyrics by Byron Gay
198	12	Porky's Hare Hunt	LT	Ben Hardaway	Volney White	Porky Pig; Bugs Bunny (prototype)	April 30, 1938	Blu-Ray/DVD: Platinum Collection: Vol. 2 DVD: Porky Pig 101
Porky Pig goes on a rabbit hunt, but a white rabbit evades Porky from shooting him. Story by Howard Baldwin
199	13	Now That Summer Is Gone	MM	Frank Tashlin	Robert McKimson	N/A (one-shot cartoon)	May 14, 1938	DVD: Golden Collection: Vol. 4
A young squirrel seeks easy wintery gains of nuts through gambling despite his father's cautionary warnings. Story by Fred Neiman
200	14	Injun Trouble	LT	Bob Clampett	Chuck Jones & Isadore Ellis	Porky Pig; Injun Joe; Sloppy Moe	May 21, 1938	DVD: Porky Pig 101
Porky Pig goes to find Injun Joe.
201	15	The Isle of Pingo Pongo	MM	Tex Avery	Irven Spence	Elmer Fudd	May 28, 1938	N/A
A "spot gag" cartoon set on the island "Pingo Pongo", which is inhabited by African Americans. Story by George Manuell Notes: One of the Censored Eleven.; First "spot gag" cartoon.
202	16	Porky the Fireman	LT	Frank Tashlin	Robert Bentley	Porky Pig	June 4, 1938	DVD: Golden Collection: Vol. 4 DVD: Porky Pig 101
Porky Pig is a firefighter who, along with his friends, has to save a theatrical boarding house from burning down. Story by Melvin Millar
203	17	Katnip Kollege	MM	Cal Howard & Cal Dalton	Joe D'Igalo	N/A (one-shot cartoon)	June 11, 1938	DVD: Golden Collection: Vol. 2 Blu-Ray/DVD: Platinum Collection: Vol. 1
In the "Swingology" classroom at Katnip Kollege, the Professor needs each student to sing their lessons to a jazz rhythm. Story by Dave Monahan
204	18	Porky's Party	LT	Bob Clampett	Chuck Jones & Norman McCabe	Porky Pig	June 25, 1938	DVD: Golden Collection: Vol. 3 DVD: Porky Pig 101
It is Porky Pig's birthday, but his friends Penguin and Goosey, his pet dog Black Fury, and the silkworm Porky received as his gift cause chaos at the party.
205	19	Have You Got Any Castles?	MM	Frank Tashlin	Ken Harris	N/A (one-shot cartoon)	June 25, 1938	DVD: Golden Collection: Vol. 2
Characters from well-known works of literary fiction come to life inside of a library after hours. Story by Jack Miller
206	20	Love and Curses	MM	Ben Hardaway & Cal Dalton	Herman Cohen	N/A (one-shot cartoon)	July 9, 1938	DVD: Gold Diggers in Paris (extra, unrestored); Blu-Ray: The Shining Hour (extra, restored); Blu-Ray: Sweethearts (extra, restored)
An old hero couple, Harold and Emily, look through a photo album including pictures of their younger selves and the villain Roger St. Clair. Story by Melvin Millar
207	21	Cinderella Meets Fella	MM	Tex Avery	Virgil Ross	Elmer Fudd	July 23, 1938	Blu-Ray: Collector's Choice: Vol. 3
An adaptation of "Cinderella" where Elmer Fudd plays Prince Charming. Story by Tedd Pierce
208	22	Porky's Spring Planting	LT	Frank Tashlin	Joe D'Igalo	Porky Pig	July 25, 1938	DVD: Porky Pig 101
Porky Pig and his dog Streamline plant many vegetables on the farm. When the crops are fully grown, chickens make a diner out of the field. Story by George Manuell
209	23	Porky & Daffy	LT	Bob Clampett	Robert Cannon & John Carey	Daffy Duck; Porky Pig	August 6, 1938	DVD: Porky Pig 101 (unrestored); Blu-Ray: Angels with Dirty Faces (extra, restored)
In the home of Porky Pig and Daffy Duck, Porky finds an ad about a boxing rooster. Daffy is awoken to warm up and eventually participates.
210	24	The Major Lied 'Til Dawn	MM	Frank Tashlin	Phil Monroe	N/A (one-shot cartoon)	August 13, 1938	N/A
A big game hunter tells a little boy stories about hunting in Africa. Story by Rich Hogan
211	25	Wholly Smoke	LT	Frank Tashlin	Robert Bentley	Porky Pig	August 27, 1938	DVD: Golden Collection: Vol. 5 Blu-Ray/DVD: Platinum Collection: Vol. 3 DVD: Porky Pig 101
On his way to church, Porky Pig encounters a bully practicing smoking tricks. Porky fails to replicate him and has a nightmare where he is force-fed by tobacco products. Story by George Manuell
212	26	A-Lad-In Bagdad	MM	Cal Howard & Cal Dalton	Volney White	Egghead	August 27, 1938	N/A
An adaptation of "Aladdin" featuring Egghead. Story by Dave Monahan
213	27	Cracked Ice	MM	Frank Tashlin	Robert McKimson	W.C. Squeals	September 10, 1938	DVD: Golden Collection: Vol. 4
While ice skating, W.C. Squeals hears a black bird in a hole in the ice. After a dog saves the bird and thaws him, the dog makes margaritas for the bird and himself. Squeals is led by a drunk fish to an ice skating contest and wins. Story by Jack Miller
214	28	A Feud There Was	MM	Tex Avery	Sid Sutherland	Elmer Fudd	September 24, 1938	Blu-Ray: Collector's Choice: Vol. 3
The Weavers and McCoys shoot at each other with their guns. When Elmer Fudd enters the story, he attempts to preach peace to both families from the boundary line. Story by Melvin Millar
215	29	Porky in Wackyland	LT	Bob Clampett	Norman McCabe & Isadore Ellis	Porky Pig; Yoyo Dodo	September 24, 1938	DVD: Golden Collection: Vol. 2 Blu-Ray/DVD: Platinum Collection: Vol. 2 DVD: Porky Pig 101
Porky Pig travels to Africa to hunt for the last do-do bird. Note: Added to the National Film Registry in 2000.
216	30	Little Pancho Vanilla	MM	Frank Tashlin	Robert McKimson	N/A (one-shot cartoon)	October 8, 1938	DVD: Golden Collection: Vol. 4
A Mexican boy named Pancho dreams of being a real toreador, despite his mother not wanting him to fight bulls. Story by Tedd Pierce
217	31	Porky's Naughty Nephew	LT	Bob Clampett	Robert Cannon	Porky Pig; Pinky Pig	October 15, 1938	DVD: Porky Pig 101
Porky Pig takes his nephew Pinky to a beach. While Porky tries to take a nap, Pinky hits him with a shovel. Pinky then tries to scare Porky with a fake shark in a swimming contest. Story by Warren Foster
218	32	Johnny Smith and Poker-Huntas	MM	Tex Avery	Paul Smith	Elmer Fudd	October 22, 1938	N/A
Elmer Fudd plays Johnny Smith, who falls in love with Poker-Huntas. Story by Rich Hogan
219	33	Porky in Egypt	LT	Bob Clampett	Norman McCabe	Porky Pig	November 5, 1938	DVD: Golden Collection: Vol. 3 Blu-Ray/DVD: Platinum Collection: Vol. 2 DVD: Porky Pig 101
Porky Pig is a tourist in Egypt. When he misses his caravan, he wanders into the desert with Humpty Bumpty the camel. Story by Ernest Gee
220	34	You're an Education	MM	Frank Tashlin	Robert McKimson	N/A (one-shot cartoon)	November 5, 1938	DVD: Golden Collection: Vol. 4
Many literary characters come to life during a midnight adventure. Story by Dave Monahan
221	35	The Night Watchman	MM	Chuck Jones	Ken Harris	N/A (one-shot cartoon)	November 19, 1938	DVD: Golden Collection: Vol. 4
A feline watchman gets sick, so his kitten son is asked to watch the kitchen. When the gangland-style rats find out that he is the one on duty, they try to take over. Story by Tedd Pierce
222	36	The Daffy Doc	LT	Bob Clampett	John Carey & Vive Risto	Daffy Duck; Porky Pig	November 26, 1938	DVD: Golden Collection: Vol. 5 DVD: The Essential Daffy Duck; DVD: Porky Pig 101
Dr. Daffy Duck's antics in the operating room of The Stitch in Time Hospital cause chaos. When he spots Porky Pig after his expulsion, Daffy brings him into the hospital for an unnecessary examination.
223	37	Daffy Duck in Hollywood	MM	Tex Avery	Virgil Ross	Daffy Duck	December 12, 1938	DVD: Golden Collection: Vol. 3
Daffy Duck wants to be an actor at Wonder Studios. Story by Dave Monahan
224	38	Porky the Gob	LT	Ben Hardaway & Cal Dalton	Gil Turner	Porky Pig	December 17, 1938	DVD: Porky Pig 101 (unrestored); Blu-Ray: The Mad Miss Manton (extra, restored)
Porky Pig is on a battleship mostly run by dogs. The captain and the crew receive a radio message about a reward for capturing a pirate submarine. When most of the crew leaves on planes, Porky must defend the ship from the submarine by himself. Story by Melvin Millar
225	39	Count Me Out	MM	Ben Hardaway & Cal Dalton	Herman Cohen	Egghead	December 17, 1938	DVD: The Amazing Dr. Clitterhouse (extra, unrestored); Blu-Ray: Sweethearts (extra, restored)
Egghead dreams of battling dog-like champion Biff Stew in a wrestling match. Story by Melvin Millar
226	40	The Mice Will Play	MM	Tex Avery	Sid Sutherland	N/A (one-shot cartoon)	December 31, 1938	Blu-Ray/DVD: Mouse Chronicles (extra, unrestored)
A lot of mice play outside of their mouse holes. Story by Jack Miller

== 1939 ==
No. overall	No. in year	Title	Series	Directed by	Animated by	Recurring characters	Original release date	Official DVD/Blu-Ray Availability
227	1	The Lone Stranger and Porky	LT	Bob Clampett	Isadore Ellis & Robert Cannon	Porky Pig	January 7, 1939	DVD: Porky Pig 101
Porky Pig is a stagecoach driver being robbed by a bad guy. The Lone Stranger must defeat him before it is too late.
228	2	Dog Gone Modern	MM	Chuck Jones	Phil Monroe	The Two Curious Puppies	January 14, 1939	Blu-Ray: Collector's Vault: Vol. 3
Two Curious Puppies, one big and one small, look over a sign of an electric house model. Once inside the house, they explore it and play with various hazardous devices. Story by Rich Hogan
229	3	It's an Ill Wind	LT	Ben Hardaway & Cal Dalton	Herman Cohen	Porky Pig; Dizzy Duck	January 28, 1939	DVD: Porky Pig 101 (unrestored); Blu-Ray: Idiot's Delight (extra, restored)
Porky Pig and his friend Dizzy Duck go fishing, but their trip is ruined by a thunderstorm. They find shelter in an old yacht club house that appears to be haunted, but their biggest problems come from a bearskin on a chair, a dog stuck in a diving helmet, and, most of all, their own clumsiness. Story by Melvin Millar
230	4	Hamateur Night	MM	Tex Avery	Paul Smith	Elmer Fudd; Porky Pig	January 28, 1939	Blu-Ray: Collector's Choice: Vol. 2
A disinterested dogface hosts an amateur talent night at the "Warmer Bros. Theatre". Most of the acts are rejected by the Judge, Porky Pig. Story by Jack Miller
231	5	Robin Hood Makes Good	MM	Chuck Jones	Robert McKimson	N/A (one-shot cartoon)	February 12, 1939	Blu-Ray: Collector's Vault: Vol. 1
Three squirrels read a book about "Robin Hood" and decide to the part of the legendary medieval outlaw. When the biggest squirrels get kidnapped by a fox, it is up to smallest squirrel to save them. Story by Dave Monahan
232	6	Porky's Tire Trouble	LT	Bob Clampett	Norman McCabe	Porky Pig	February 18, 1939	DVD: Porky Pig 101
Porky Pig works at the Snappy Rubber Company, where he turns rubber trees into tires. His dog Flat Foot Flookey sneaks in to evade a "no pets" policy and Porky fails to get him out. Story by Warren Foster
233	7	Gold Rush Daze	MM	Ben Hardaway & Cal Dalton	Gil Turner	N/A (one-shot cartoon)	February 25, 1939	N/A
A dog-faced gas station attendant tells the story of his fruitless chase for gold to a prospector; since 1849, the attendant pursued strikes around the world and never had any success. Story by Melvin Millar
234	8	A Day at the Zoo	MM	Tex Avery	Rollin Hamilton	Elmer Fudd	March 11, 1939	Blu-Ray: Collector's Vault: Vol. 1
A "spot gag" cartoon set in the "Kalama Zoo" featuring animal-related gags, including two skunk gags, three monkey gags, and a running gag where Elmer Fudd repeatedly taunts a lion in its cage. Story by Melvin Millar
235	9	Porky's Movie Mystery	LT	Bob Clampett	John Carey	Porky Pig	March 11, 1939	DVD: Porky Pig 101
In a parody of the Mr. Moto series, a mysterious phantom has been haunting Hollywood for weeks, ruining pictures and frightening stars. Porky Pig as Mr. Motto is the only one to stop the phantom. Story by Ernest Gee
236	10	Prest-O Change-O	MM	Chuck Jones	Rudy Larriva	The Two Curious Puppies; Bugs Bunny (prototype)	March 11, 1939	Blu-Ray/DVD: Platinum Collection: Vol. 2
The Two Curious Puppies escape from a dog catcher and hide in an abandoned house owned by the unseen magician Sham-Fu. After entering and being separated from each other, the big dog faces off against Sham-Fu's pet rabbit, while the small puppy faces off against a rope and a magic wand that he swallows.
237	11	Chicken Jitters	LT	Bob Clampett	Robert Cannon & Vive Risto	Porky Pig	April 1, 1939	DVD: Porky Pig 101
Porky Pig runs a poultry farm that is only filled with chickens. After an egg hatches into a duckling, a fox steals it. The ducks arrive at the farm to kill the fox.
238	12	Bars and Stripes Forever	MM	Ben Hardaway & Cal Dalton	Rod Scribner	N/A (one-shot cartoon)	April 8, 1939	Blu-Ray: Collector's Vault: Vol 1
Anthropomorphic dog prisoners resort to all means possible to attempt a prison breakout. When the dogs make a break for it, the canine cops are on their heels. The prisoners are really in the doghouse with the warden when they attempt to escape from "Alcarazz", where "stone walls do not a prison make... but they sure help!" Story by Jack Miller
239	13	Daffy Duck and the Dinosaur	MM	Chuck Jones	A.C. Gamer	Daffy Duck	April 22, 1939	DVD: Golden Collection: Vol. 3
A Jack Benny-esque caveman named Casper and his pet dinosaur Fido go hunting for breakfast and come upon Daffy Duck, who repeatedly tricks them. Story by Dave Monahan
240	14	Porky and Teabiscuit	LT	Ben Hardaway & Cal Dalton	Herman Cohen	Porky Pig; Phineas Pig	April 22, 1939	DVD: Golden Collection: Vol. 3 DVD: Porky Pig 101
Phineas Pig sends his son Porky to deliver some feed to the horse racetrack and be paid eleven dollars for the work. On the way home, he arrives at an auction and accidentally spends the money on a horse named "Teabiscuit". Teabiscuit turns out to be a sick, broken down horse, but Porky is able to shape him up so he can race. Despite this, Teabiscuit can not clearly think well. With help from a balloon pop, however, Porky is able to procure a victory and win back his money. Story by Melvin Millar
241	15	Thugs with Dirty Mugs	MM	Tex Avery	Sid Sutherland	N/A (one-shot cartoon)	May 6, 1939	DVD: Golden Collection: Vol. 3
Killer Diller and his gang rob banks whose names run in numerical order. Despite the police being unable to arrest the gang due to sight gags, Flat-Foot Flanigan with a Floy Floy gets help from a man in the front of the theatre. Story by Jack Miller
242	16	Kristopher Kolumbus Jr.	LT	Bob Clampett	Norman McCabe & Isadore Ellis	Porky Pig	May 13, 1939	DVD: Porky Pig 101
Porky Pig plays Christopher Columbus in 1492.
243	17	Naughty but Mice	MM	Chuck Jones	Phil Monroe	Sniffles	May 20, 1939	Blu-Ray/DVD: Mouse Chronicles
Sniffles the mouse has a common cold, so he goes to a drug store to find a remedy for it. After drinking a boozy mixture, he encounters a razor and befriends him. When a black cat captures Sniffles, the razor shaves the fur off the cat to save Sniffles. Story by Rich Hogan
244	18	Believe It or Else	MM	Tex Avery	Virgil Ross	Elmer Fudd	June 3, 1939	N/A
A parody of Ripley's Believe It or Not!. Story by Dave Monahan
245	19	Polar Pals	LT	Bob Clampett	John Carey	Porky Pig	June 3, 1939	DVD: Golden Collection: Vol. 5 DVD: Porky Pig 101
Porky Pig lives in an igloo in the Arctic, where he sleeps with polar bears, bathes in water that freezes up at once, and dances in the ice and snow with the native fauna. A greedy fur trapper named I. Killem arrives and threatens Porky and his friends. Porky fires a musket with explosives in an attempt to stop Killem. Killem flees into a whale that he mistakes for a kayak. Story by Warren Foster
246	20	Hobo Gadget Band	MM	Ben Hardaway & Cal Dalton	Richard Bickenbach	N/A (one-shot cartoon)	June 17, 1939	N/A
A group of homeless men who reside in a hobo camp make their own musical instruments out of found objects, form a band and audition for a radio program. Story by Jack Miller
247	21	Scalp Trouble	LT	Bob Clampett	Norman McCabe	Daffy Duck; Porky Pig	June 24, 1939	DVD: Porky Pig 101
General Daffy Duck destroys Soldier Porky Pig's bed and Indians try to defeat Army Post No. 13. Story by Ernest Gee
248	22	Old Glory	MM	Chuck Jones	Robert McKimson	Porky Pig	July 1, 1939	DVD: Golden Collection: Vol. 2 Blu-Ray/DVD: Platinum Collection: Vol. 1 DVD: Porky Pig 101
Uncle Sam teaches Porky Pig about history from Colonial America through the midnight ride of Paul Revere and the American Revolutionary War to the expansion of the American Old West, briefly alluding to Abraham Lincoln.
249	23	Porky's Picnic	LT	Bob Clampett	Robert Cannon & Vive Risto	Porky Pig; Petunia Pig; Pinky Pig	July 15, 1939	DVD: Porky Pig 101
Porky Pig asks his girlfriend Petunia (newly designed by Clampett's team) if she would like to go on a picnic with him, and she accepts. Pinky follows them and tries to stop a naughty squirrel outside of Porky and Petunia's picnic location.
250	24	Dangerous Dan McFoo	MM	Tex Avery	Paul Smith	N/A (one-shot cartoon)	July 15, 1939	Blu-Ray: Collector's Choice: Vol. 4
An adaptation of the poem "The Shooting of Dan McGrew" with characters as dogs. Story by Rich Hogan
251	25	Snowman's Land	MM	Chuck Jones	Ken Harris	N/A (one-shot cartoon)	July 29, 1939	N/A
In the northeast of Canada, a small Mountie finds himself going up against the accursed outlaw, Dirty Pierre. Story by Dave Monahan
252	26	Wise Quacks	LT	Bob Clampett	Isadore Ellis	Daffy Duck; Porky Pig	July 29, 1939	DVD: Golden Collection: Vol. 5 DVD: Porky Pig 101
Daffy Duck is surprised that his wife has several eggs waiting to be hatched. As Porky Pig comes to congratulate Daffy, all of the eggs hatch. An eagle tries to make off with one of the babies and kidnaps a drunk Daffy, and eventually, all of the Eagles get drunk. Story by Warren Foster
253	27	Hare-um Scare-um	MM	Ben Hardaway & Cal Dalton	Gil Turner	Bugs Bunny (prototype)	August 5, 1939	Blu-Ray/DVD: Platinum Collection: Vol. 2
John Sourpuss is angry that meat prices have risen in grocery stores. So he decides to go hunting for rabbits with his dog. Story by Melvin Millar
254	28	Detouring America	MM	Tex Avery	Rollin Hamilton	N/A (one-shot cartoon)	August 12, 1939 (Note: Archived from an August 17 article, this is based on the fact that new cartoon shorts would typically premiere in theaters on Saturdays.) (earliest known date)	Blu-Ray/DVD: Each Dawn I Die (extra, unrestored)
A tour of the United States with recurring checks on the progress of the human fly climbing the Empire State Building. Story by Jack Miller Note: Nominated for the Academy Award for Best Animated Short Film in 1940.
255	29	Little Brother Rat	MM	Chuck Jones	Robert McKimson	Sniffles	August 26, 1939	Blu-Ray/DVD: Mouse Chronicles
Sniffles steals a cat's whiskers and brings them to a party game's judge. Sniffles then tries to steal a baby owl egg from a father owl, but chaos ensues when he tries to escape his house with it. Story by Rich Hogan
256	30	Porky's Hotel	LT	Bob Clampett	John Carey & Norman McCabe	Porky Pig; Dizzy Duck	September 2, 1939	DVD: Porky Pig 101 (unrestored); Blu-Ray: The Return of Doctor X (extra, restored)
Porky Pig runs a hotel located in the small center of the town. A goat checks in to rest, but gets trouble when Dizzy Duck won't let him sleep because he keeps hitting a fly with a hammer.
257	31	Sioux Me	MM	Ben Hardaway & Cal Dalton	Herman Cohen	N/A (one-shot cartoon)	September 3, 1939 (earliest known date)	N/A
An Indian reservation is experiencing the worst drought in a decade. But instead of water for the barrel, the chief's son buys weather pills, which the other Natives and animals eat. The rain maker then saves a rain pill from a vulture and throws it into the sky. Story by Melvin Millar
258	32	Land of the Midnight Fun	MM	Tex Avery	Charles McKimson	N/A (one-shot cartoon)	September 14, 1939 (earliest known date)	DVD: Allegheny Uprising (extra, unrestored)
A "spot gag" cartoon featuring a cruise on its way to Nome, Alaska. Story by Melvin Millar
259	33	Jeepers Creepers	LT	Bob Clampett	Vive Risto	Porky Pig	September 22, 1939 (earliest known date)	DVD: Porky Pig 101
Porky Pig is a police officer who has to investigate a haunted house. A trickster ghost plays pranks on him. Story by Ernest Gee
260	34	Little Lion Hunter	MM	Chuck Jones	Phil Monroe	Inki; Minah Bird	September 23, 1939 (Note: Archived from a September 24 article, this is based on the fact that new cartoon shorts would typically premiere in theaters on Saturdays.) (earliest known date)	N/A
Little African boy Inki is out hunting in the jungle with his spear, but has some difficulty in capturing any animals. He is also oblivious to the fact that a ferocious lion has selected him as prey and is sneaking up on him. Story by Bob Givens
261	35	Naughty Neighbors	LT	Bob Clampett	Isadore Ellis	Porky Pig; Petunia Pig	October 7, 1939	DVD: Porky Pig 101
The McCoy clan, led by Porky Pig, and the Martin clan, led by Petunia Pig, go at war. Porky ultimately uses a "Feud Pacifier" grenade to put the war to an end. Story by Warren Foster
262	36	The Good Egg	MM	Chuck Jones	Ken Harris	N/A (one-shot cartoon)	October 21, 1939	Blu-Ray: Idiot's Delight (extra, restored)
A hen with no chicks adopts a turtle egg. Story by Dave Monahan
263	37	Fresh Fish	MM	Tex Avery	Sid Sutherland	N/A (one-shot cartoon)	October 28, 1939	N/A
A "spot gag" cartoon involving sea animals seen from the Santa Anita. Story by Jack Miller
264	38	Pied Piper Porky	LT	Bob Clampett	John Carey & Dave Hoffman	Porky Pig	November 3, 1939 (earliest known date)	DVD: Porky Pig 101
Porky Pig is a piper who serenades with his pipe. When a mouse arrives after Porky's tune, Porky tries to kill it.
265	39	Fagin's Freshmen	MM	Ben Hardaway & Cal Dalton	Rod Scribner	N/A (one-shot cartoon)	November 12, 1939	N/A
Blackie, a little black kitten, dreams that he runs off to join a school for criminals. Tiring of "sissy stuff," he gets his wish when he teams up with Fagin and his school for young crooks. Story by Jack Miller
266	40	Porky the Giant Killer	LT	Ben Hardaway & Cal Dalton	Gil Turner	Porky Pig	November 15, 1939 (Note: Archived from a November 25 article, this is based on the fact that new cartoon shorts would typically premiere in theaters on Saturdays.) (earliest known date)	DVD: Porky Pig 101
Porky Pig sneaks inside a giant's castle. Story by Melvin Millar
267	41	Sniffles and the Bookworm	MM	Chuck Jones	Robert McKimson	Sniffles; The Bookworm	November 26, 1939 (earliest known date)	Blu-Ray/DVD: Mouse Chronicles
Mother Goose characters come to life in a book store late at night, serenading Sniffles and the Bookworm. Story by Rich Hogan
268	42	Screwball Football	MM	Tex Avery	Virgil Ross	N/A (one-shot cartoon)	December 2, 1939 (Note: Archived from a December 5 article, this is based on the fact that new cartoon shorts would typically premiere in theaters on Saturdays.) (earliest known date)	N/A
A "spot gag" cartoon set in a football stadium. Story by Melvin Millar
269	43	The Film Fan	LT	Bob Clampett	Norman McCabe & Vive Risto	Porky Pig	December 15, 1939 (earliest known date)	DVD: Golden Collection: Vol. 3 DVD: Porky Pig 101
While on his way to the grocery store to pick up groceries for his mother, Porky Pig stops by a sign that says that the local movie theater is having a "kids admitted free" day. Porky excitedly runs in and views various spoofs of things such as newsreels, movie trailers, and films. The usher receives a telephone call that a boy disobeyed his mother by coming to the movies; he stops the show to announce that he'd better go home right now, and everybody dashes out, causing the theater to deflate.
270	44	The Curious Puppy	MM	Chuck Jones	Phil Monroe	The Two Curious Puppies	December 23, 1939 (earliest known date)	N/A
The Two Curious Puppies are at a closed-up amusement park. The little white puppy sneaks inside, while the big golden boxer dog tries to protect the white puppy.
271	45	Porky's Last Stand	LT	Bob Clampett	Isadore Ellis	Daffy Duck; Porky Pig	December 29, 1939 (earliest known date)	DVD: Porky Pig 101
Porky Pig and Daffy Duck run a diner that sells eggs, coming from chickens. When a customer asks for a hamburger, Daffy gets his hands on what appears to be a calf's tail, but ends up actually grabbing a bull, and hijinks ensue. Story by Warren Foster
