= Inki and the Lion =

1941 film by Charles M. Jones

- Directed by: Charles M. Jones
- Story by: Rich Hogan
- Produced by: Leon Schlesinger
- Music by: Carl W. Stalling
- Animation by: Phil Monroe
- Color process: Technicolor
- Production company: Leon Schlesinger Productions
- Distributed by: Warner Bros. Pictures
- Release date: July 5, 1941
- Running time: 6 min
- Country: United States
- Language: English

Inki and the Lion is a 1941 American animated comedy short film directed by Charles M. Jones. It was released on July 5, 1941. It is part of the Merrie Melodies series and the second cartoon to feature Inki. It was re-released as a "Blue Ribbon" reissue in 1950, rendering the original film and credits lost.

== Plot ==
Inki tries and fails to hunt a monkey. He comes upon the Minah Bird, who uses his spear as a walkway after dodging. He tricks Inki again with a skunk. Inki tries to hunt an oblivious lion cub, which almost succeeds until its father appears. He makes a mad dash for survival and somehow lands on the lion, running again after stepping on the lion's teeth.

Inki hides from the lion and finds the Minah Bird on his head. Inki chases the Minah Bird while the lion chases him. Inki tricks them into hiding in a cave and blocking the entrance, not realizing the lion is elsewhere. Inki enters the cave, is threatened by the lion again, then finds him teleporting out after blocking the entrance again. He is hypnotized into walking into the lion's mouth, but finds the Minah Bird leaving the cave with ease. Cornered, Inki accepts his fate, but the lion's tail is tied into a tree by the Minah Bird. Impressed, Inki tries to shake the Minah Bird's claw, but it swings him and slams him on the ground instead.

== Home media ==
Inki and the Lion is available in an unrestored version on the VHS tape I Taw a Putty Tat, and the laserdisc The Golden Age of Looney Tunes Volume 3 (side 10).
