= Rover's Rival =

1937 film by Robert Clampett

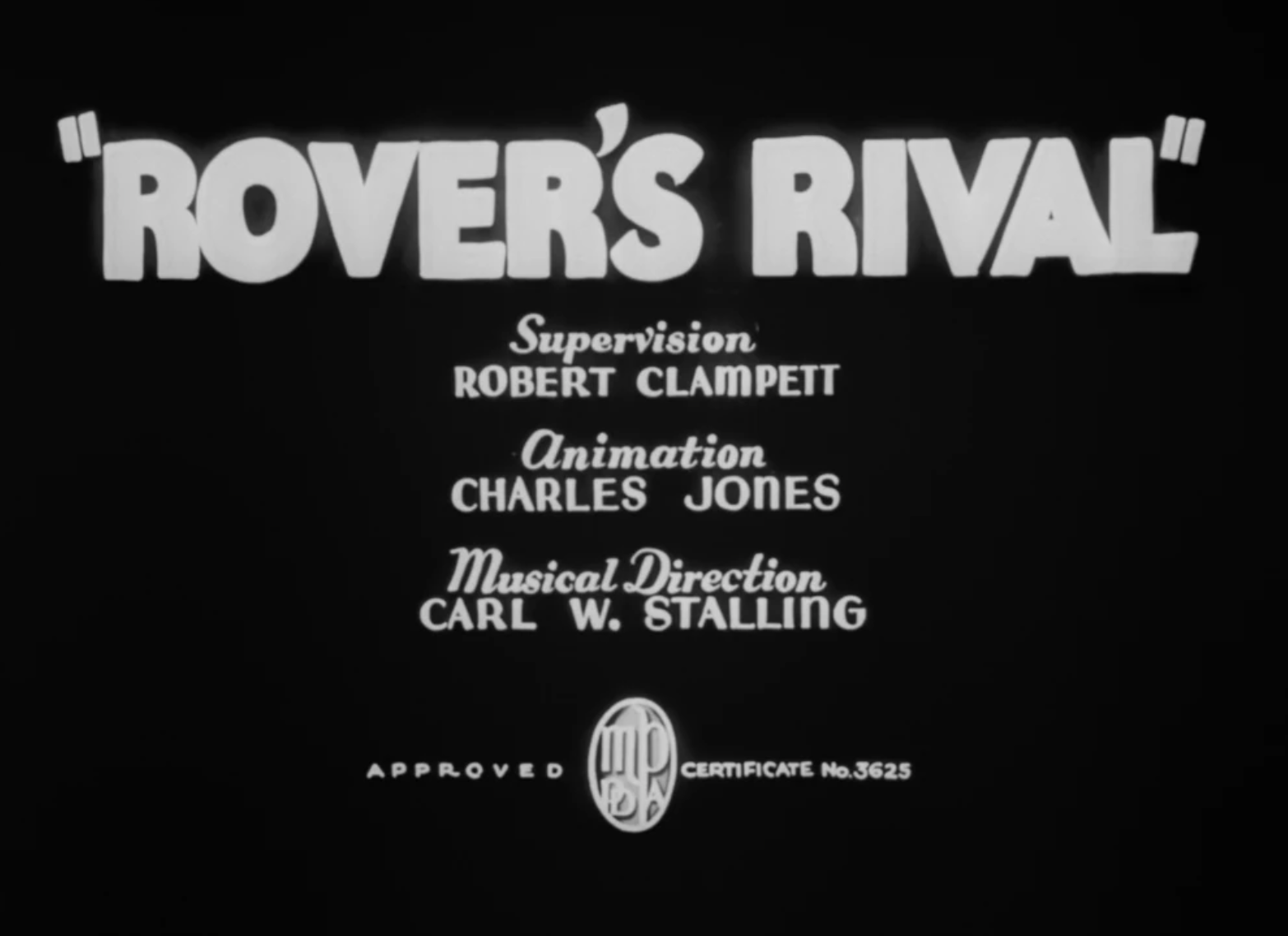
- Title card
- Directed by: Robert Clampett
- Produced by: Leon Schlesinger
- Starring: Mel Blanc
- Music by: Carl W. Stalling
- Animation by: Charles Jones
- Color process: Black and white
- Production company: Leon Schlesinger Productions
- Distributed by: Warner Bros. Productions; The Vitaphone Corporation
- Release date: October 9, 1937
- Running time: 7 min
- Country: United States
- Language: English

Rover's Rival is a 1937 American animated comedy short film directed by Robert Clampett. It was released on October 9, 1937. It is the 92nd film in the Looney Tunes series and the 30th cartoon to feature Porky Pig. It is the first film in the series to use "The Merry-Go-Round Broke Down", which would become the series' main theme and be used until the series' retirement in 1969.

== Plot ==
Porky reads about new dog tricks and decides to teach them to his dog Rover, who is too old and senile to properly follow the instructions. A puppy finds him struggling and sabotages his truck attempts to mock his senility. He attracts Porky's attention by catching a ball meant for Rover and doing tricks before mocking his stutter too.

Porky throws a stick for Rover to retrieve; the puppy gives him a 15-second headstart, knowing that Rover is too sluggish to retrieve it quickly before taking the stick. Rover manages to retrieve the stick, but his dentures fall off, causing the puppy to take credit by retrieving the dentures. Porky manages to stop the puppy from intervening, only for Rover to unknowingly retrieve a stick of dynamite from a conveniently placed explosive zone.

To Porky's horror, the puppy repeatedly retrieves the stick of dynamite, then throws an absurdly large amount of dynamite in his face before sticking them in an attempt to kill Porky, all while Rover returns to the house to look up the word 'dynamite' in a dictionary. The puppy traps Porky in dynamite when Rover realizes the situation and picks up the dynamite while the puppy chases him. As the puppy is trapped by Rover's dentures on a tree, Rover delivers the dynamite to a far place to protect Porky and the puppy from certain death. Horrified by Rover's selfless sacrifice, the puppy expresses remorse over causing the conflict, only for Rover to emerge unscathed.

== Home media ==
Rover's Rival is available on disc 2 of the Porky Pig 101 DVD set.

== See also ==
- Porky Pig filmography
- Looney Tunes and Merrie Melodies filmography (1930–1939)
