= Daffy Duck & Egghead =

1938 film by Fred Avery

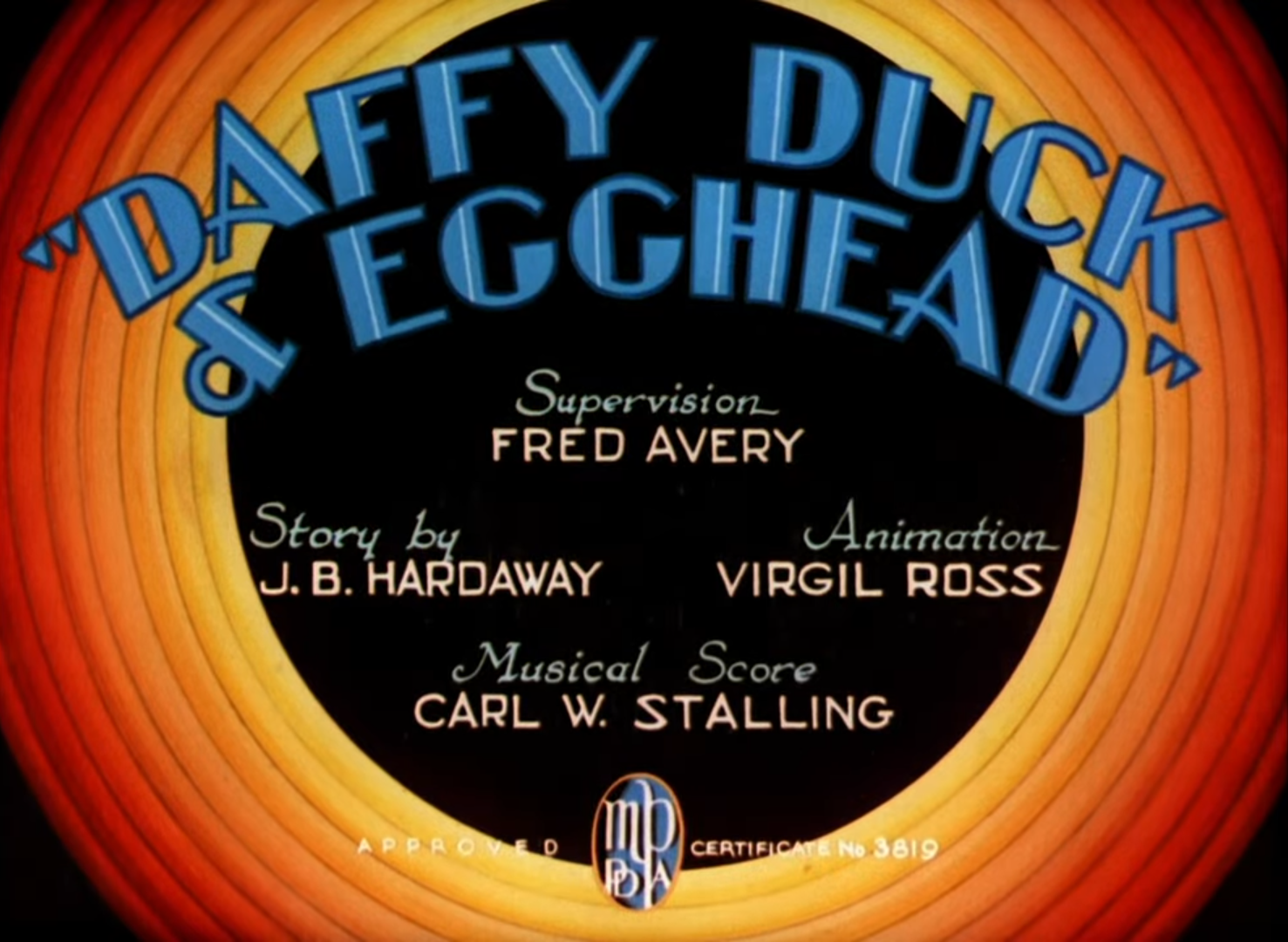
- Original title card
- Directed by: Fred Avery
- Story by: J. B. Hardaway
- Produced by: Leon Schlesinger
- Starring: Mel Blanc; Danny Webb; Tedd Pierce
- Music by: Carl W. Stalling
- Animation by: Virgil Ross
- Color process: Technicolor
- Production company: Leon Schlesinger Productions
- Distributed by: Warner Bros. Productions; The Vitaphone Corporation
- Release date: January 1, 1938
- Running time: 7 min
- Country: United States
- Language: English

Daffy Duck & Egghead is a 1938 American animated comedy short film directed by Fred Avery. The cartoon was released on January 1, 1938. It is the 88th film in the Merrie Melodies series, the second cartoon to star Egghead and the second cartoon to star Daffy Duck, who is first named in this cartoon. It was written by Bugs Hardaway and directed by Tex Avery. It was re-released as a "Blue Ribbon" reissue in 1946 as Daffy Duck and Egghead.

== Plot ==
Egghead goes to a pond to hunt ducks, finding a large number of hunters across the pond. He is annoyed by a silhouetted man in the theater audience who refuses to sit down and stay put, causing him to be shot dead. He finds Daffy Duck, who bites his nose and taunts him before leaving. Egghead uses a female duck decoy to lure Daffy, who comments on the tactic's unfunny nature. He then ties a knot with Egghead's shotgun and spins away.

A tortoise gives them both guns in an attempt to resolve the conflict, only to be accidentally shot due to Egghead's poor shooting skill. Egghead then chases Daffy with his shotgun and shoots various buildings instead of Daffy, even after Daffy places an apple on his head. Daffy realizes Egghead's utter incompetence, so he labels him blind and gives him sunglasses and pencils to add oil to the insult. Daffy sings "The Merry-Go-Round Broke Down" and dives into the water with a duck who looks similar to him.

Egghead uses reeds that open like blinds to shoot Daffy, only for Daffy to use a demon mask to scare the bullets into returning to the shotgun. He finally manages to capture Daffy by shooting a pair of gloves from his gun, which knock Daffy out and allowing Egghead to place him in a net. Just as Egghead celebrates, a duck from the lunatic asylum, the same duck comes to claim Daffy. He thanks Egghead for helping to catch Daffy, and tells him that Daffy is 100 percent nuts. Being the other duck from earlier, he and Daffy beat Egghead up before spinning into the distance. Humiliated, Egghead leaves the scene in the same manner.

== Voice cast ==
- Mel Blanc as Daffy Duck / Tortoise Referee / Ambulance Duck
- Danny Webb as Egghead
- Tedd Pierce as Audience Member

== Home media ==
- VHS 1988 - Cartoon Moviestars: Daffy! (Blue Ribbion) - MGM/UA Home Video
- Laserdisc 1988 - Cartoon Moviestars: Daffy! & Porky! (Blue Ribbion) - MGM/UA Home Video
- Laserdisc 1991 - The Golden Age of Looney Tunes: Volume 1 (Blue Ribbion) - MGM/UA Home Video
- VHS 1992 - The Golden Age of Looney Tunes: Vol. 2 - Firsts (Blue Ribbion) - MGM/UA Home Video
- DVD 2005 - Looney Tunes Golden Collection: Volume 3 (restored with original titles) - Warner Home Video
- DVD 2011 - The Essential Daffy Duck (restored with original titles) - Warner Home Video
- Blu-Ray 2025 - Looney Tunes Collector's Vault: Volume 1 (restored with original titles) - Warner Archive Collection

== See also ==
- Daffy Duck filmography
- Looney Tunes and Merrie Melodies filmography (1930–1939)

Preceded by Porky's Duck Hunt	Daffy Duck Cartoons; 1938	Succeeded by The Daffy Doc
