= Sweet Sioux =

1937 film by Isadore Freleng

- Directed by: Isadore Freleng
- Produced by: Leon Schlesinger
- Starring: Mel Blanc
- Music by: Carl W. Stalling
- Animation by: Bob McKimson; A.C. Gamer
- Color process: Technicolor
- Production company: Leon Schlesinger Productions
- Distributed by: Warner Bros. Productions; The Vitaphone Corporation
- Release date: June 26, 1937
- Running time: 7 min
- Country: United States
- Language: English

Sweet Sioux is a 1937 American animated comedy short film directed by Isadore Freleng. It was released on June 26, 1937. It is the 77th film in the Merrie Melodies series. It was re-released as a "Blue Ribbon" reissue in 1944, rendering the original film and credits lost. It is also the first film in the series to use "The Merry-Go-Round Broke Down", which would later become the main theme of the Looney Tunes series until 1964. The film has never aired on television and was only released on home media through The Golden Age of Looney Tunes LaserDisc due to its offensive portrayal of Native Americans.

== Plot ==
It is morning in an Indian reservation. Various humorous Native American individuals are introduced, including Chief "Rain in the Face", whose face is perpetually hit with rain, a college student who sings "Freddy the Freshman", and a hitchhiker who hitchhikes on an old woman's back.

A lone wagon is spotted, with the Native Americans transmitting the message throughout the village. A caricature of Martha Raye sings while men dance. The Native Americans rob the wagon with rifles as the owner shoots them. They struggle to dodge while being shot at like duck targets. The battle becomes increasingly absurd as the Native Americans circle the wagon to the tune of "The Merry-Go-Round Broke Down", with one individual retrieving a gold ring from a tree, while other Native Americans treat the battle like a football game. One Native American is shot in the buttocks, while his replacement assists the warriors in looting the wagon. Two warriors emerge from the ruins of the wagon and hit each other.
