= Inki and the Minah Bird =

1943 film by Charles M. Jones

- Directed by: Charles M. Jones
- Story by: Tedd Pierce
- Produced by: Leon Schlesinger
- Starring: Mel Blanc
- Music by: Carl W. Stalling
- Animation by: James Culhane
- Color process: Technicolor
- Production company: Leon Schlesinger Productions
- Distributed by: Warner Bros. Pictures
- Release date: November 13, 1943
- Running time: 7 min
- Country: United States
- Language: English

Inki and the Minah Bird is a 1943 American animated comedy short film directed by Charles M. Jones. It was released on November 13, 1943. It is part of the Merrie Melodies series and the third cartoon to feature Inki. It was re-released as a "Blue Ribbon" reissue in 1949, rendering the original film and credits lost. It is the only cartoon in the series to credit James Culhane, who went to Walter Lantz Productions as a director for Woody Woodpecker cartoons after its release. Inki and the Minah Bird was the only Inki short to fall into the public domain; all the rest in the series are under copyright. (Note: Attributed to multiple references.)

== Plot ==
Inki is an African young boy hunting small animals with a spear. One creature he briefly tries following is a minah bird, which walks across the scene with a hopping gait. Unlike Inki and all the other creatures in the cartoon, the minah bird shows no emotional reactions or changes in facial expression regardless of circumstances. Inki then encounters a fearsome lion. The lion then chases the boy, who briefly winds up in the lion's mouth, but escapes with the lion's teeth, revealed to be a set of dentures. The lion recovers its teeth and chases after Inki until distracted by the minah bird, which the lion then pursues. In a twisting blurred fight, the bird triumphs over the lion, and in the last scene the lion's large dentures are shown now in the minah bird's mouth.

== Home media ==
- VHS
  - Inki & the Minah Bird (released by Troy Gold in 1988) - re-released by Burbank Video in 1991
  - Kartoon Klassics Volume 10 (released by Viking Video Classics in 1986) - re-released by Burbank Video in 1991
- Laserdisc
  - The Golden Age of Looney Tunes: Volume 3, Side 3 (released by MGM/UA Home Video)
- DVD
  - Cartoon Craze Presents: Donald Duck / Woody Woodpecker: Pantry Panic (released by Digiview Productions)
