= Rhythm in the Bow =

1934 film by Ben Hardaway

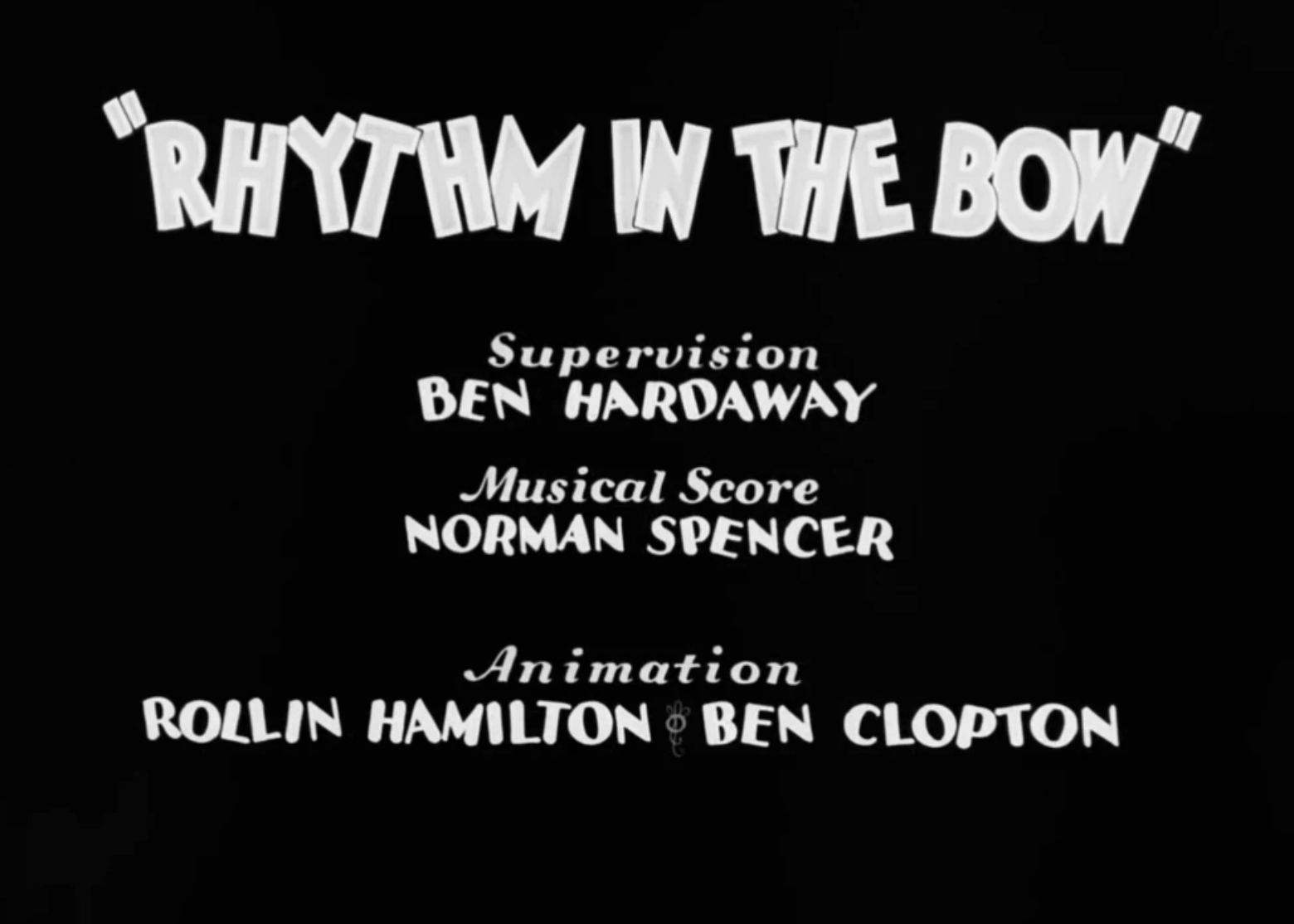
- Title card
- Directed by: Ben Hardaway
- Produced by: Leon Schlesinger
- Music by: Norman Spencer
- Animation by: Rollin Hamilton; Ben Clopton
- Color process: Black and white
- Production company: Leon Schlesinger Productions
- Distributed by: Warner Bros. Productions; The Vitaphone Corporation
- Release date: October 20, 1934
- Running time: 7 min
- Country: United States
- Language: English

Rhythm in the Bow is a 1934 American animated comedy short film directed by Ben Hardaway. The short was released on October 20, 1934. It is the 40th film in the Merrie Melodies series, the first to be directed by Hardaway, as well as the final to be released in black-and-white.

== Plot ==
A hobo rides on top of a speeding train, honking a bird for fun. Another lays low, sharpens his knife to cut a hot dog bun with a wheel and heats a hot dog with heat from its friction for lunch. Another rides in the actual train, using a bucket to scoop up lake water before using trace amounts to wash himself and playing the violin to the titular song.

Other hobos hiding nearby sing the titular song. One hobo who ties his hammock to the door ends up being locked out. Another rides a car sparingly linked to the train, using a hook to avoid a collusion with a pipe hiding another hobo. Another skates behind the train while being tied to it. The train enters a tunnel, with soot covering the singing hobos' faces like blackface.

A hobo dislikes the violin music and kicks the player out of the train into a pond. The abandoned hobo then reconstructs the pond as compensation for the ducks in it, then whistles "Kingdom Coming" with the birds. He finds a barking dog in front of a fence door, realizing that the dog backs off each time he plays a note on the violin. He plays a sad song, which reduces the dog to tears, before quickly slamming the door shut and locking the angry dog inside.

To the hobo's delight, he finds an abandoned and decrepit house occupied by fellow hobos, who respectively bathe in a broken sink, dream about hitchhiking and kick a mosquito while reading "Anthony Adverse". The hobo slides down, bouncing on sleeping hobos, to a river, where he opens his shoe soles like a can to wash his toes and play the titular song, which other hoboes sing to. The dog from earlier sniffs his way to the hobo's location for revenge and chases him. They somehow run to the train tracks, where a train speeds towards their location. The hobo manages to escape, but the dog has its collar stuck on the tracks. The hobo chooses to abandon his violin to cut off the dog's collar and set it free, and the two jump off in time to avoid death. The dog gratefully brings the hobo his violin as they become friends.
