= Bosko the Drawback =

1932 film by Hugh Harman

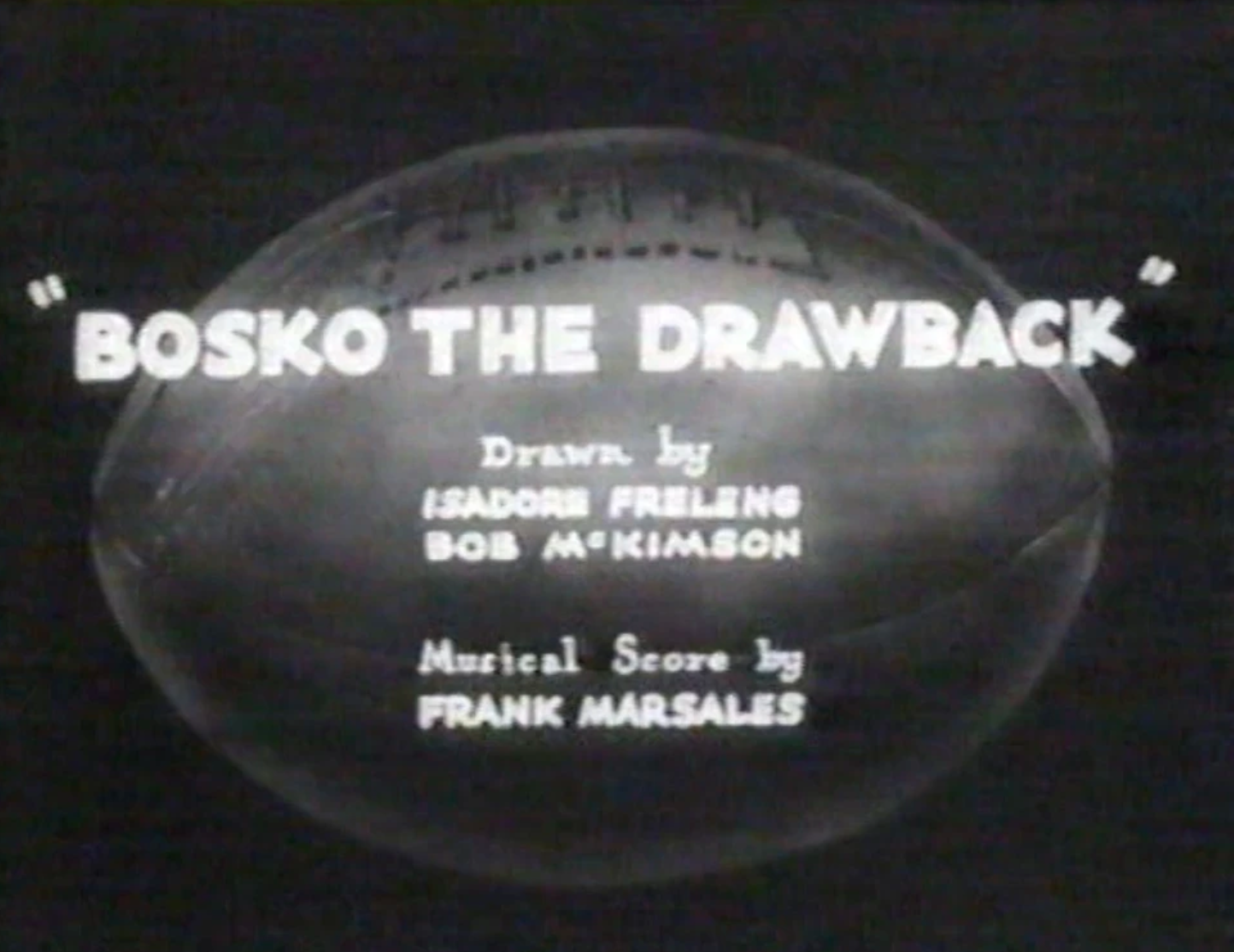
- Title card
- Directed by: Hugh Harman
- Produced by: Hugh Harman; Rudolf Ising; Leon Schlesinger
- Music by: Frank Marsales
- Animation by: Isadore Freleng; Bob McKimson
- Color process: Black and white
- Production companies: Harman-Ising Productions; Leon Schlesinger Productions
- Distributed by: Warner Bros. Pictures; The Vitaphone Corporation
- Release date: October 22, 1932
- Running time: 7 min
- Country: United States
- Language: English

Bosko the Drawback is a 1932 American animated comedy short film directed by Hugh Harman. It is the 27th film in the Looney Tunes series featuring Bosko. It was released on October 22, 1932. It is the second 1932 cartoon distributed by Warner Bros. Pictures to remain under copyright, as it was renewed in 1961, while earlier 1932 cartoons were neglected by then-owner, Warner Bros. subsidiary Sunset Productions; it will lapse into the public domain on January 1, 2028.

== Plot ==
A marching band marches across a football field, with a bird inside the leader's hat singing for the band. Goopy Geer serves as the ticket attendant at the stadium. Bosko receives a last-minute massage which becomes more painful by the second. Bosko finishes his massage and summons his teammates as the match starts.

As Bosko spits on his hands and shoes, the dog referee tries to start the match by shooting a blank, only for an egg to fall out, from which a chick emerges and blows a whistle. Bosko catches the ball while a dachshund teammate helps him defend against the opposing team by stretching his body and ramming into them. They are eventually stopped by the opposing team. An old dog attempts to type the details of the event, only to be hit by the typewriter itself. An old mouse is hit by the ball.

As the second round progresses, Bosko passes the ball to a centipede teammate, who outmaneuvers the opposing team by sacrificing parts of his body until his size is reminiscent of Bosko. A card stunt occurs where the audience forms the face of a cheering dog, which then "spits" to insult the opposing team by literally having audience members jump into the field. As Bosko notices the incoming opposing team members, he runs back to be launched by the dachshund into the goal, scoring a touchdown as he collapses. He revives and celebrates his victory.

== Reception ==
The Film Daily said it was "plenty of action and excitement that will please the kids."
