= The Merry-Go-Round Broke Down =

1937 song

Song
- Published: Harms Inc. (1937)
- Songwriters: Cliff Friend; Dave Franklin

"The Merry-Go-Round Broke Down" is a song written in 1937 by Cliff Friend and Dave Franklin and published by Harms Inc., New York. It is best known as the theme tune for the Looney Tunes cartoon series and Merrie Melodies reissued cartoon series produced by Warner Bros. Cartoons, used from 1937 to 1969.

Popular recordings of the song included versions by Shep Fields, Russ Morgan and Eddy Duchin.

The original version contains an introductory verse that leads up to the main part of the song, as a young man tells of his date with a young woman, in which they go to an amusement park and find time to "spark" while riding the malfunctioning carousel. The name was a play on "breakdown" and the tune is similar to the traditional "Chinese Breakdown" as well as the children's rhyme "Miss Susie had a steamboat".

== Merrie Melodies and Looney Tunes ==
The tune first appeared in the Merrie Melodies cartoon short Sweet Sioux, released June 26, 1937.

Starting with the Looney Tunes cartoon short Rover's Rival released October 9, 1937, an adapted instrumental version of the song's main tune became the staple opening and closing credits theme for the Looney Tunes series, most memorably featuring Porky Pig stuttering "Th-th-th-that's all, folks!" over the tune at each cartoon's end.

A different vocal version, sung by Mel Blanc (voice of Daffy Duck), was heard in Daffy Duck and Egghead, a 1938 entry in the Merrie Melodies series at about five minutes into the cartoon. Daffy also sang a specially-modified version of the song in the 1950 Looney Tunes short Boobs in the Woods.

The tune also made appearances in the Merrie Melodies shorts Jungle Jitters (1938) and Aviation Vacation (1941). The Three Stooges recorded a version in 1959 for their musical album The Nonsense Songbook.

In 1962, a new, more dissonant, variation of the theme was arranged by William Lava for use with the updated opening sequences for new one-off shorts of Looney Tunes and Merrie Melodies shorts, starting with Now Hear This before becoming the permanent theme for all cartoons after Warner Bros. Cartoons shut down and DePatie–Freleng Enterprises took over production. In 1967, a remix of the Lava version was used in the opening sequences of new Looney Tunes and Merrie Melodies shorts.

== Who Framed Roger Rabbit ==
The song is used in the film Who Framed Roger Rabbit (1988), an animation/live-action blend based upon the cartoons of the 1940s. "The Merry-Go-Round Broke Down" is performed twice in the film: first by cartoon character Roger Rabbit (voiced by Charles Fleischer), as he is being assisted by his human partner Eddie Valiant (Bob Hoskins) in hiding out from Judge Doom's weasel henchmen and later by Valiant himself in Marvin Acme's gag factory, as he is trying to force the same cartoon weasels (after they capture Roger and Jessica Rabbit) to laugh themselves to death. The lyrics in both sequences were written specifically for the film. Roger's version was released on the soundtrack to the film.

== Other usage ==
- The song was in a live-action film, A Slight Case of Murder (Warner Bros., 1938), in which party guests sing a verse while standing around a piano.
- An instrumental version of the song is heard as source music 49 minutes into the 1941 Warner Bros. film noir, Out of the Fog.
- In a 1963 episode of 77 Sunset Strip titled "By His Own Verdict," the tune can be heard playing on a carousel in a scene set in a park.
- During the late-1960s and early-'70s, The Grateful Dead—signed to Warner Bros. Records during that time—occasionally used this piece as filler material while one or several members of the band were tuning up. On the expanded edition of Wake of the Flood, the track "China Doll" concludes with a brief jam on the piece.
- The song appeared as amusement park music in the 1979 Wonder Woman episode "Phantom of the Roller Coaster".
- In 1983, the song was recorded by the British folk band Pyewackett with vocal by Rosie Cross, on the LP The Man in the Moon Drinks Claret. The liner notes read, "Finding love for only a dime" and describe the song as "A 'Looney Tune' based on a Roy Fox recording from the 1930s".
- An instrumental version of the tune also appears at the end of Gremlins 2: The New Batch (1990), which opens and closes with Looney Tunes characters interacting with each other, and at the end of Looney Tunes: Back in Action (2003) and Space Jam: A New Legacy (2021). It is also used as the main theme to The Looney Tunes Show, New Looney Tunes, and one of the main themes of Looney Tunes Cartoons.

== See also ==
- "Merrily We Roll Along" – 1935 song
- "Miss Susie had a steamboat" – American schoolyard rhyme with rude or profane words
- Fairground organ – Pneumatic musical organ originating from France
