= Bosko's Woodland Daze =

1932 film by Hugh Harman

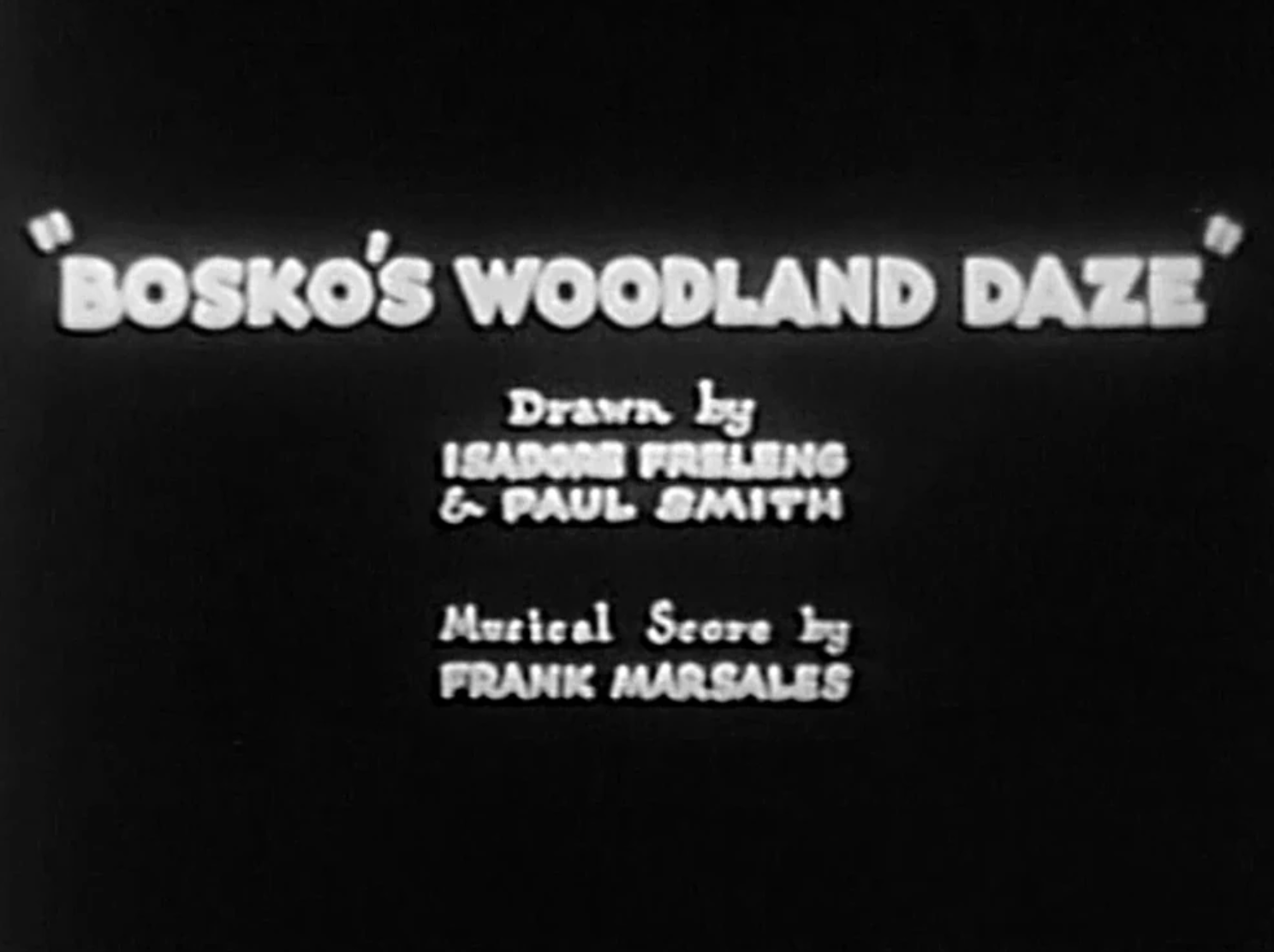
- Title card
- Directed by: Hugh Harman
- Produced by: Hugh Harman; Rudolf Ising; Leon Schlesinger
- Music by: Frank Marsales
- Animation by: Isadore Freleng; Paul Smith
- Color process: Black-and-white
- Production companies: Harman-Ising Productions; Leon Schlesinger Productions
- Distributed by: Warner Bros. Pictures; The Vitaphone Corporation
- Release date: December 17, 1932
- Running time: 7 min.
- Country: United States
- Language: English

Bosko's Woodland Daze is an American animated comedy short film directed by Hugh Harman. It is the 29th film in the Looney Tunes series featuring Bosko. It was released on December 17, 1932. It is the final 1932 cartoon distributed by Warner Bros. Pictures to remain under copyright, as it was renewed in 1961, while earlier 1932 cartoons were neglected by then-owner, Warner Bros. subsidiary Sunset Productions; it will lapse into the public domain on January 1, 2028.

== Plot ==
Bosko plays a harmonica in the forest while Bruno follows him. He tries playing hide-and-seek with Bruno, who is confused by the act until the leaves Bosko hides under are blown away. Bruno pulls a vine under Bosko, which tickles his genitalia.

Bosko starts the game for real. Bruno tries to hide in a tree, only to be chased by a woodpecker on his head. He lands in water and is soon found by Bosko. It is Bosko's turn to hide. While Bruno counts, he speaks a rare spoken line "Are you listening?". Bosko finds shelter behind a small "bush", only to find that the leaves consist wholly of small birds who fly away in protest. While Bosko finds a larger tree to hide behind, Bruno is distracted by a tortoise which bites its nose.

Bosko drifts to sleep while he waits for Bruno. Some elves encase him in a bubble while flowers turn into fairies who sing. Bosko wakes up and sneezes, popping the bubble and causing him to fall while the elves fail to rescue him with a spider web. He falls down a cliff, calling for Honey's assistance, and lands unscathed on a giant piano. He plays a ragtime tune with his limbs while the elves dance, only for a giant to appear. Bosko frantically runs for his life but is caught by the giant, who makes him into a sandwich and brushes him with mustard. This is revealed to be a nightmare, with the brush being Bruno licking him, as Bosko wakes up relieved and happy Bruno found him.

== Reception ==
The Film Daily called it "satisfactory".
