= Freddy the Freshman =

1932 film

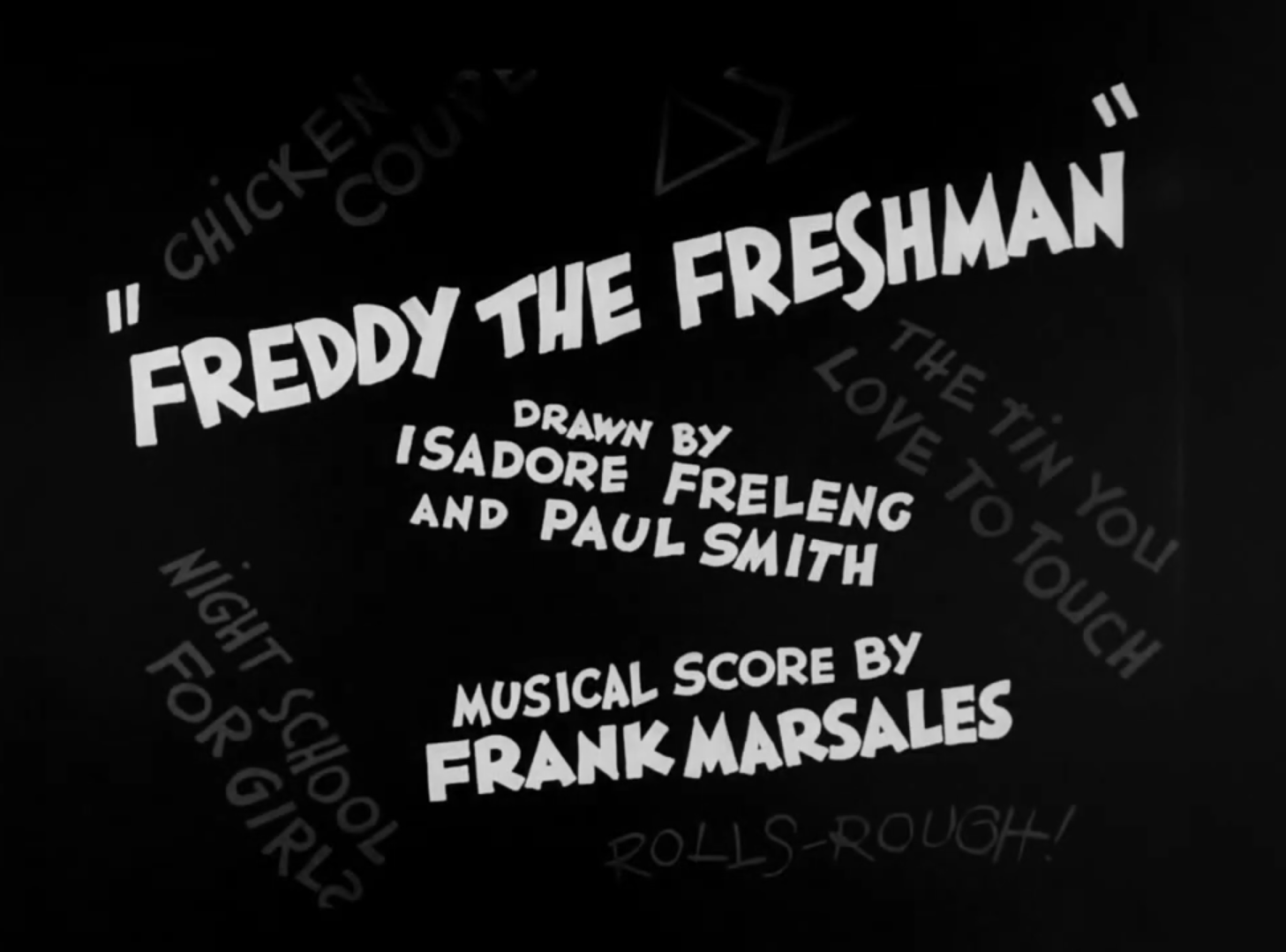
- Title card
- Directed by: Rudolf Ising
- Produced by: Hugh Harman; Rudolf Ising; Leon Schlesinger
- Music by: Frank Marsales
- Animation by: Isadore Freleng; Paul Smith
- Color process: Black and white
- Production companies: Harman-Ising Productions; Leon Schlesinger Productions
- Distributed by: Warner Bros. Pictures; The Vitaphone Corporation
- Release date: February 20, 1932
- Running time: 6:55
- Country: United States
- Language: English

Freddy the Freshman is a 1932 American animated short film directed by Rudolf Ising. It is the eighth film in the Merrie Melodies series. The short was released on February 20, 1932.

== Plot ==
Full short in restored form

Raccoon coat-clad Freddy the Freshman is on his way to a pep rally in his automobile, which proves to be faulty and breaks down at the entrance. He vies for the affection of a girl with another student, succeeding by tackling him and causing his body to stretch, much to his anger.

A football game then starts. The student punts the ball, which is swallowed by a pig on the opposing side. Freddy kicks the ball out and speeds across the field, evading capture as well as an obstacle in the form of a dachshund's body, outsmarting him by leading him to a tree and leaving his body tangled; he almost scores a touchdown. The opposing players wrangle him and toss the ball, which Freddy chases. A turtle is angered after he is left flipped and unable to leave, which he does by leaving his shell. A duck on the opposing side manages to score a touchdown, much to his chagrin. Freddy builds a wheel out of train tracks to speed up, as well as using a hanging rack to keep up after this does not work. He scores a touchdown as the film ends.

== Freddy The Freshman, The Freshest Kid in Town ==
The cartoon is built around "Freddy The Freshman, The Freshest Kid in Town", a song written by Cliff Friend and Dave Oppenheim and part of the Warner Bros. library. Following its use in this cartoon, "Freddy The Freshman, The Freshest Kid in Town" was used as an incidental score cue (usually relating to football in some way) in many later Warner Bros. cartoons. In "Raw! Raw! Rooster!", the song is sung by the character of Rhode Island Red, rival and nemesis to Foghorn Leghorn. A version of the tune is heard during a badminton duel in "Bad Ol' Putty Tat".

== See also ==
- List of American football films
- List of animated films in the public domain in the United States
- Looney Tunes and Merrie Melodies filmography (1930–1939)
