= Little Lion Hunter =

1939 film by Charles Jones

- Directed by: Charles Jones
- Story by: Robert Givens
- Produced by: Leon Schlesinger
- Music by: Carl W. Stalling
- Animation by: Philip Monroe
- Color process: Technicolor
- Production company: Leon Schlesinger Productions
- Distributed by: Warner Bros. Pictures
- Release date: September 23, 1939 (Note: Archived from a September 24 article, this is based on the fact that new cartoon shorts would typically premiere in theaters on Saturdays.); (earliest known date)
- Running time: 7 min
- Country: United States
- Language: None

Little Lion Hunter is a 1939 American animated comedy short film directed by Charles Jones. The short was released to theaters as early as September 23, 1939. It is part of the Merrie Melodies series and the first cartoon to feature Inki. It was re-released as a "Blue Ribbon" reissue in 1946 as The Little Lion Hunter, rendering the original film and credits lost.

== Plot ==
Inki fails to hunt a parrot, giraffe and butterfly with his spear. He then finds giant footprints created by the Minah Bird, who walks to the beat of Felix Mendelssohn's The Hebrides and is chased into a hole. He tricks Inki with a sleeping skunk.

Inki tries to hunt a tortoise, who escapes into a hole. Inki could not find the tortoise while the Minah Bird walks on him. Inki angrily throws his spear, which coincidentally forms a bridge for the Minah Bird to walk across a cliff. He chases the Minah Bird into a tree, where the Minah Bird tricks him into falling, while a lion spots him. Inki does not realize the lion is next to him until he squeezes under a tree and spots it. Inki disguises himself as a cut tree trunk, which the lion falls for until the Minah Bird's call causes him to notice Inki running. As Inki taunts the lion, the Minah Bird emerges from the trunk and distracts the lion, who is brutally beat up and tied to a tree offscreen. The Minah Bird points Inki towards the trapped lion before kicking him, much to his confusion.

== Home media ==
Little Lion Hunter is available in an unrestored version on the VHS tapes The Best of Bugs Bunny and Friends and I Taw a Putty Tat, and the laserdisc The Golden Age of Looney Tunes Volume 2 (side 4).
