= Inki =

Warner Bros. theatrical cartoon character

- Looney Tunes/Merrie Melodies character
- Inki hunting in Caveman Inki
- First appearance: Little Lion Hunter (1939)
- Last appearance: Caveman Inki (1950)
- Created by: Chuck Jones

In-universe information
- Species: Human
- Gender: Male

Inki is a fictional character created by animator Chuck Jones for the Looney Tunes and Merrie Melodies series of short films. Five Inki cartoons were made between 1939 and 1950.

== History and description ==
Inki is a little African boy who usually dresses in a simple loincloth, armband, legband, earrings, and a bone through his hair. He never speaks. The character's pickaninny look was designed by Disney veteran Bob Givens and was cleaned up by Charlie Thorson. The plot of the first cartoon focuses on little Inki hunting, oblivious to the fact that he himself is being hunted by a hungry lion.

Also central to the series is the Minah Bird, a minimalist and expressionless mynah bird, which Givens also designed and said he based on a bird he saw in Hawaii, spelled "minah bird" in the title of the third short. The bird, who is accompanied by Felix Mendelssohn's The Hebrides, a.k.a. "Fingal's Cave", utterly disregards any obstacles or dangers. The mynah bird, shown as nearly almighty, appears randomly in the films, always intervening against the other characters. Occasionally, the bird's intervention benefits Inki by stopping Inki's pursuers. Inki then tries to thank the bird, but the latter ends up being disrespectful to Inki, too. He does not talk at all, and is droopy eyed almost all the time. The Minah Bird made a cameo appearance in the Animaniacs episode "Bad Mood Bobby" in a pet shop when he kicks The Goodfeathers away in retaliation for the insults against him when they make fun of him in order to cheer up Bobby.

Comics historian Don Markstein wrote that the character's racial stereotype "led to [the series'] unpopularity with program directors and thence to its present-day obscurity." He noted that, "The Minah Bird, which appears immensely powerful, [is] an accomplished trickster; and yet acts, when it acts at all, from motives which simply can not be fathomed". The series' director, Chuck Jones, said that these cartoons were baffling to everyone, including himself. He had no understanding of what the bird was supposed to do other than walk around. But the shorts were well-accepted by audiences. According to Terry Lindvall and Ben Fraser, Inki is an everyman who encounters mysterious forces of life. He serves as a symbol of all humanity, "frustrated and rescued by the wonderfully inexplicable". According to Jones, "he grew up sensitive to the feeling of minorities" and so never set out to mock them.

The series did not end due to outside pressure, but Warner Bros' cartoons dropped the use of racist caricatures at the beginning of the 1950s. Some of the last Warner cartoons with racial stereotypes were Bugs Bunny's shorts Which Is Witch in 1949 and Southern Fried Rabbit in 1953 and Daffy Duck's 1949 short Wise Quackers; the last Inki cartoon was Caveman Inki, in 1950.

== Appearances ==
- Little Lion Hunter (October 7, 1939)
- Inki and the Lion (1941)
- Inki and the Minah Bird (1943)
- Inki at the Circus (1947)
- Caveman Inki (November 25, 1950)

== Home media ==
The 1986 videotape "I Taw a Putty Tat" included Little Lion Hunter, Inki and the Lion, and Inki at the Circus. Also, in 2004, the "Cartoon Craze" DVD included Inki and the Minah Bird.

== Sources ==
- Cohen, Karl F. (2004), "Racism and Resistance: Stereotypes in Animation", Forbidden Animation: Censored Cartoons and Blacklisted Animators in America, McFarland & Company, ISBN 978-0786420322
- Lindvall, Terry; Fraser, Ben (1998), "Darker Shades of Animation:African-American Images in the Warner Bros. Cartoon", in Sandler, Kevin S. (ed.), Reading the Rabbit: Explorations in Warner Bros. Animation, Rutgers University Press, ISBN 978-0813525389
