= List of Toon In with Me episodes (2026) =

This is a list of episodes of the American live-action/animated anthology comedy television series Toon In with Me that aired on MeTV in 2026.

== Episodes ==
No. overall	No. in year	Title	Original release date
1068	1	"Trekkin' the Cornhusker State"	January 5, 2026
Oh my, Omaha! Nebraska's splendor is savored by Toony and Bill. Featured cartoons: Tree for Two (1952), The Talking Magpies (1946), Corn Plastered (1951), Hero for a Day (1952), Hare-Less Wolf (1958)
1069	2	"Happy Birthday, Pepe!"	January 6, 2026
Bill and Toony celebrate the debut of Pepé Le Pew. Featured cartoons: Odor-able Kitty (1945), Scent-imental Over You (1947), Past Perfumance (1955), Odor of the Day (1948), A Scent of the Matterhorn (1961)
1070	3	"Toon In's Wellness Wednesday: Money Matters"	January 7, 2026
Bill and Toony try to improve their finances in the new year with consumer advocate and special guest Jeff Rossen from Rossen Reports. Featured cartoons: One Froggy Evening (1955), Daffy's Diner (1967), Cool It, Charlie (1969), Taxi-Turvy (1954), Half Baked Alaska (1965); Special Guest Appearance: Jeff Rossen as himself.
1071	4	"Throwback Thursday: 1949"	January 8, 2026
Bill and Toony explore the year 1949. Featured cartoons: Love That Pup (1949), Happy Landing (1949), The Coo-Coo Bird Dog (1949), Hippety Hopper (1949), Awful Orphan (1949)
1072	5	"Close Encounter"	January 13, 2026
Professional alligator wrangler, Frank Robb, teaches Bill how to wrangle a gator. Featured cartoons: Nasty Quacks (1945), Rock-A-Bye Gator (1962), Baby Wants Spinach (1950), Chimp and Zee (1968), Romp in a Swamp (1959)
1073	6	"Toon In's Wellness Wednesday: The Healing Power of Laughter"	January 14, 2026
Bill and Mr. Quizzer learn the healing power of laughter. Featured cartoons: The Reckless Driver (1946), Billy Boy (1954), Daffy Dilly (1948), Hospitaliky (1937), Little Red Riding Rabbit (1944)
1074	7	"Trekkin' the Granite State"	January 16, 2026
Bill and Toony visit a snowy New Hampshire. Featured cartoons: Greedy for Tweety (1957), I-Ski Love-Ski You-Ski (1936), To Spring (1936), Kiddie Koncert (1948), The First Snow (1947)
1075	8	"Sew Be It!"	January 19, 2026
Bill and Mr. Quizzer learn how to knit. Featured cartoons: Sheep Ahoy (1954), Little Johnny Jet (1953), Betty Boop's Crazy Inventions (1933), The Bungling Builder (1971), Rebel Rabbit (1949)
1076	9	"Toon In's Wellness Wednesday: Fitness"	January 21, 2026
Determined to meet his fitness goals, Bill learns easy, low-impact exercises to get healthy in 2026. Featured cartoons: A Bird in a Guilty Cage (1952), Betty Boop and Little Jimmy (1936), Never Kick a Woman (1936), Hunger Strife (1960), All Fowled Up (1955)
1077	10	"Hunkiest Man Alive"	January 22, 2026
A competition of hunks, but only one will be crowned the Hunkiest Man Alive. Featured cartoons: What's Cookin' Doc? (1944), Cock-a-Doodle-Duel (2004), Arts and Flowers (1956), Flowers for Madame (1935), Mucho Locos (1966)
1078	11	"Trekkin' the Palmetto State"	January 23, 2026
Bill and Toony journey across South Carolina on their latest stop trekkin' across every state in America. Featured cartoons: Walky Talky Hawky (1946), The Intruders (1947), Dog Gone South (1950), Sufferin' Cats! (1943), The Rebel Without Claws (1961)
1079	12	"Trekkin' the Natural State"	January 26, 2026
Bill and Toony explore the great state of Arkansas. Featured cartoons: Goofy Gophers (1947), Laddy and His Lamp (1964), You Gotta Be a Football Hero (1935), Nell's Yells (1939), Shishkabugs (1962)
1080	13	"Toon In's Wellness Wednesday: Breaking Bad Habits"	January 28, 2026
Bill learns how to declutter with a pro. Featured cartoons: Henhouse Henery (1949), Hatch Up Your Troubles (1949), Satisfied Customers (1954), Freeloading Feline (1960), Tweet and Lovely (1959)
1081	14	"Toon In with Moi"	January 29, 2026
Bill and Toony take a trip to Paris. Featured cartoons: French Rarebit (1951), Heaven Scent (1956), Hippydrome Tiger (1968), Young and Healthy (1933), Boston Quackie (1957)
1082	15	"Coldest Winter Ever"	January 30, 2026
Bill and Toony relive the coldest winters ever. Featured cartoons: What's Brewin', Bruin? (1948), Snowbody Loves Me (1964), Space Kid (1966), Room and Wrath (1956), Little Boy Boo (1954)
1083	16	"Black History - Harlem Rennaissance"	February 2, 2026
Bill and Toony celebrate Black History Month with a look back at the Harlem Renaissance. Featured cartoons: Daffy Flies North (1980), Too Hop to Handle (1956), The Wreck of the Hesperus (1944), Sh-h-h-h-h-h (1955), Baton Bunny (1959)
1084	17	"Novelty Bill"	February 3, 2026
Bill and Toony explore novelty amusements, gadgets, and toys. Featured cartoons: The Stupor Salesman (1948), Hip Hip Ole (1964), Stop! Look! And Hasten! (1954), The Novelty Shop (1936), Penny Antics (1955)
1085	18	"Trekkin' Old Dominion"	February 4, 2026
Bill and Toony trek through Virginia and cook up some stew. Featured cartoons: Fox-Terror (1957), Yankee Doodle Bugs (1954), Olive Oyl for President (1948), The Story of George Washington (1965), Along Came Daffy (1947)
1086	19	"Throwback Thursday: 1971"	February 5, 2026
Bill and Toony explore the year 1971. Featured cartoons: To Hare Is Human (1956), Airlift a la Carte (1971), Hare and Loathing in Las Vegas (2004), A Boy, a Gun and Bird (1940), Tom's Photo Finish (1957)
1087	20	"On This Day...February 6th"	February 6, 2026
Bill and Toony look back at some of the biggest events that happened on February 6th. Featured cartoons: Snow Excuse (1966), This Is a Life? (1955), Sorry Safari (1962), The Football Toucher Downer (1937), O-Solar Meow (1967)
1088	21	"Love and Humor"	February 9, 2026
Love Week kicks off with a deep dive into rom-coms. Featured cartoons: Really Scent (1959), Shakespearian Spinach (1940), Rodent to Stardom (1967), Ding Dog Daddy (1942), Love Me, Love My Mouse (1966)
1089	22	"For the Love of Tom & Jerry"	February 10, 2026
Bill and Toony continue Love Week by celebrating the debut of Tom and Jerry. Featured cartoons: Solid Serenade (1946), Buddies Thicker Than Water (1962), Filet Meow (1966), Busy Buddies (1956), Texas Tom (1950)
1090	23	"Romancing the Tome"	February 11, 2026
Mr. Quizzer, or 'Quizzio,' becomes a cover model for romance novels, while Bill and Toony get swept up in steamy books. Featured cartoons: Rabbit Romeo (1957), Love's Labor Won (1948), Little 'Tinker (1948), Janie Get Your Gun (1965), Tom and Chérie (1955)
1091	24	"Love Reunited"	February 12, 2026
Love Week continues with a love story for the ages. Featured cartoons: The Crackpot King (1946), Blind Date (1953), Beware of Barnacle Bill (1935), Eatin' on the Cuff or The Moth Who Came to Dinner (1942), Banty Raids (1963)
1092	25	"Pal-entine's Day"	February 13, 2026
When none of them have dates for Valentine's Day, the gang spends a day just for the guys. Featured cartoons: Easy Peckin's (1953), Don't Look Now (1936), Rival Romeos (1950), Nearlyweds (1957), Springtime for Thomas (1946)
1093	26	"Black History in Visual Art"	February 17, 2026
Bill and Toony celebrate Black History Month by honoring some of the greatest African American artists. Featured cartoons: Rabbit Rampage (1955), The Painter and the Pointer (1944), Op, Pop, Wham and Bop (1966), Gee Whiz-z-z-z-z-z-z (1956), House Tricks? (1946)
1094	27	"Personality Crisis"	February 18, 2026
Toony, Bill and Quizzer take personality tests, which leads to a crisis of identity for the Quiz-man. Featured cartoons: Dime to Retire (1955), Lazy Little Beaver (1947), A Mouse Divided (1953), The Hollywood Matador (1942), Rushing Roulette (1965)
1095	28	"Throwback Thursday: 1990"	February 19, 2026
Bill and Toony revisit the year 1990. Featured cartoons: Box-Office Bunny (1991), Batty Baseball (1944), The Great Piggy Bank Robbery (1946), Merry Mannequins (1937), Bugs' Bonnets (1956)
1096	29	"Jobs of Yesteryear"	February 20, 2026
Bill looks for a second job. Featured cartoons: Canned Feud (1951), Ten Pin Terrors (1953), Saddle Silly (1941), A Clean Shaven Man (1936), A Chilly Reception (1958)
1097	30	"Digital Detox"	February 23, 2026
Toony's forced to unplug on a digital detox retreat. Featured cartoons: The Music Mice-Tro (1967), Sniffles Takes a Trip (1940), Big House Blues (1947), Stop That Noise (1935), Beep, Beep (1952)
1098	31	"Trekkin' Series Finale: Land of Lincoln"	February 24, 2026
Toony and Bill have a very special tour guide through Illinois – Abraham Lincoln himself! Featured cartoons: Rabbit Transit (1947), Keep in Style (1934), The Green Line (1944), Catty-Cornered (1966), Stupor Duck (1956)
1099	32	"On This Day...February 25th"	February 25, 2026
Bill and Toony take a look at some of the biggest events that happened on February 25th. Featured cartoons: Pirate's Gold (1955), Fleets of Stren'th (1942), Fish and Slips (1962), Snowtime for Comedy (1941), Banquet Busters (1948)
1100	33	"Black History - Sitcoms, Spin-offs & Stars"	February 26, 2026
Bill and Toony celebrate their favorite Black comedies from Sanford and Son to A Different World. Featured cartoons: Doggone Cats (1947), Field and Scream (1955), Knock Knock (1940), Terrier-Stricken (1952), The Dog House (1952)
1101	34	"Combine Time"	February 27, 2026
Bill and Mr. Quizzer participate in Toon In With Me's very first athletic combine. Featured cartoons: Bunny Hugged (1951), Shoein' Hosses (1934), Football Bugs (1936), The Mouse of Tomorrow (1942), Fastest with the Mostest (1960)
1102	35	"Porky's Debut"	March 2, 2026
Bill and Toony celebrate the debut of Porky Pig with an all-Porky lineup. Featured cartoons: I Haven't Got a Hat (1935), The Sour Puss (1940), Deduce, You Say! (1956), Dough for the Do-Do (1949), Claws for Alarm (1954)
1103	36	"Women's History - Sports"	March 3, 2026
Bill and Toony look back at female pioneers in sports, from hockey to baseball, and football. Featured cartoons: The Wabbit Who Came to Supper (1942), Gone Batty (1954), Down with Cats (1943), Riding the Rails (1938), Red Riding Hoodwinked (1955)
1104	37	"Sideshow Toony"	March 4, 2026
Bill and Toony become sideshow performers. Featured cartoons: To Itch His Own (1958), Betty Boop's Crazy Inventions (1933), Bear Feat (1949), Pop 'im Pop! (1950), Show Biz Bugs (1957)
1105	38	"Springing Forward!"	March 6, 2026
Bill and Toony get ready to set the clocks ahead. Featured cartoons: Good Night Elmer (1940), Calling All Cuckoos (1956), Porky's Spring Planting (1938), Cinderella Meets Fella (1938), Swing Ding Amigo (1966)
1106	39	"Greener Posture"	March 10, 2026
Bill finally gets a modern cellphone which ruins his posture. Fortunately, Toony (and an expert) has the cure. Featured cartoons: Caballero Droopy (1952), Feline Frame-Up (1954), Gooney's Goofy Landings (1970), The Squawkin' Hawk (1942), The Wacky Wabbit (1942)
1107	40	"Women's History - Media"	March 11, 2026
Bill and Toony celebrate trailblazing women in media. Featured cartoons: Little Televillain (1958), Nutty News (1942), The Big Birdcast (1938), The Scared Crows (1939), A Hare Grows in Manhattan (1947)
1108	41	"Barnstorming Bill"	March 12, 2026
When Toony discovers Bill's skill at thumb-wrestling, they take the show on the road. Featured cartoons: The Leghorn Blows at Midnight (1950), Case of the Cold Storage Yegg (1963), Mighty Mouse and the Pirates (1945), Sheep Wrecked (1958), Rabbit Hood (1949)
1109	42	"Pie Day"	March 13, 2026
Bill and Toony celebrate Pi Day early. Featured cartoons: Case of the Missing Hare (1942), Crockett-Doodle-Do (1960), A Pizza Tweety-Pie (1958), Gabby's Diner (1961), Quiet Please! (1945)
1110	43	"Toony's Talent Showcase"	March 16, 2026
Toony hosts his very own talent showcase. Featured cartoons: People Are Bunny (1959), Guest Who? (1965), Symphony in Spinach (1948), The Hep Cat (1942), Messed Up Movie Makers (1966)
1111	44	"St. Paddy's Day Hooray!"	March 17, 2026
Bill and Toony travel to the Emerald Isle to celebrate St. Patrick's Day like the Irish. Featured cartoons: His Better Elf (1958), The Wearing of the Grin (1951), Droopy Leprechaun (1958), Shamrock and Roll (1969), My Bunny Lies over the Sea (1948)
1112	45	"Pillow Talk"	March 18, 2026
Mr. Quizzer starts a pillow company. Bill and Toony have loads of fun with the overstock. Featured cartoons: Doggone Tired (1949), Rock 'n' Rodent (1967), Steeple Jacks (1951), Smoked Hams (1947), The Big Snooze (1946)
1113	46	"Women's History - Going Undercover"	March 19, 2026
Bill and Toony celebrate women who were spies. Featured cartoons: Sugar and Spies (1966), Phoney Express (1962), The Mouse from H.U.N.G.E.R. (1967), False Hare (1964), Under the Counter Spy (1954)
1114	47	"Boxing Bill"	March 20, 2026
Bill trains with a Golden Gloves boxing champ. Featured cartoons: Rabbit Punch (1948), Let's You and Him Fight (1934), Fistic Mystic (1969), Punchy Pooch (1962), Mother Was a Rooster (1962)
1115	48	"Women's History - Explorers"	March 23, 2026
Bill and Toony learn about famous female explorers with special guest and star of Expedition Bigfoot, Mireya Mayor. Featured cartoons: Punch Trunk (1953), Practical Yolk (1966), The New Deal Show (1937), The Trip (1967), The Abominable Snow Rabbit (1961); Special Guest Appearance: Mireya Mayor as herself.
1116	49	"The Truck Stops Here"	March 24, 2026
When a highway is built next to the studio, Toony opens a truck stop. Featured cartoons: Going! Going! Gosh! (1952), Spare The Rod (1953), I Gopher You (1954), Tally-Hokum (1965), Homeless Hare (1950)
1117	50	"Trekkin' the Land of the Rising Sun"	March 25, 2026
Bill and Toony kick off their trek around the globe in Japan. Featured cartoons: Trip for Tat (1960), Pettin' in the Park (1934), Scrappy Birthday (1949), A Language All My Own (1935), Piker's Peak (1957)
1118	51	"It's 86!"	March 27, 2026
Taking a day off work, Bill and Toony live it up like it's 1986. Featured cartoons: Baby Butch (1954), Wild About Hurry (1959), Kickin the Conga Round (1942), Pill Peddlers (1952), Sahara Hare (1955)
1119	52	"Ask Wally"	March 30, 2026
MeTV's resident archivist, Wally Fyles, shares interesting facts. Featured cartoons: Bugs Bunny Gets the Boid (1942), Porky and Gabby (1937), Booby Hatched (1944), Zoom and Bored (1957), Polar Pests (1958)
1120	53	"Making a Spring Break for It"	March 31, 2026
Bill and Toony are forced to improvise when spring break plans don't go as planned. Featured cartoons: Room and Bird (1951), Tumble Weed Greed (1969), Aviation Vacation (1941), Vacation with Play (1951), Salt Water Tabby (1947)
1121	54	"A Day for Fools"	April 1, 2026
Bill and Toony turn out to be the fools on April Fools. Featured cartoons: Hare Tonic (1945), Wotta Nitemare (1939), Happy-Go-Nutty (1944), Deep Sea Doodle (1960), Bad Day at Cat Rock (1965)
1122	55	"Past Perfect 10s"	April 2, 2026
Bill and Toony look back at things that have been rated a perfect 10. Is anything truly perfect (besides Toony)? Featured cartoons: Feed the Kitty (1952), Hold the Wire (1936), The Cat Concerto (1947), Crazy Mixed Up Pup (1955), The Scarlet Pumpernickel (1950)
1123	56	"Easter Eggstravaganza"	April 3, 2026
Bill and Toony prepare for Easter with an elevated brunch menu. Featured cartoons: Easter Yeggs (1947), The Chocolate Chase (1980), The Egg Cracker Suite (1943), Happy Go Ducky (1958), A Bird in a Bonnet (1958)
1124	57	"A Touch of Classical"	April 6, 2026
Bill takes his triangle skills to the symphony. Plus, a special musical performance. Featured cartoons: Rabbit of Seville (1950), Carmen Get It! (1962), A Soapy Opera (1952), A Ham in a Role (1949), Long-Haired Hare (1949)
1125	58	"Mystiying Magic"	April 7, 2026
Bill and Toony celebrate the art of magic with a mystifying performance. Featured cartoons: Hot Cross Bunny (1948), A Balmy Swami (1949), Merlin the Magic Mouse (1967), Mighty Mouse and the Magician (1948), Good Noose (1962)
1126	59	"What's Opera, Tooners?"	April 8, 2026
Bill and Toony talk all-things opera. An opera singer performs a classic song. Featured cartoons: What's Opera, Doc? (1957), The Cat Above and the Mouse Below (1964), Sunny Italy (1950), Off to the Opera (1952), Back Alley Oproar (1948)
1127	60	"Return to The Cackle Barrel"	April 9, 2026
Toony's comedy club, The Cackle Barrel, is open again. Bill welcomes a special stand-up guest. Featured cartoons: Hollywood Daffy (1946), The Hep Cat (1946), A Gooney Is Born (1970), Red Hot Riding Hood (1943), Pet Peeve (1954)
1128	61	"Put on Your Dancing Toons"	April 10, 2026
Bill and Toony celebrate the art of dance with a modern performance. Featured cartoons: Down Beat Bear (1956), Morning, Noon and Night Club (1937), The Woody Woodpecker Polka (1951), Betty Boop and Grampy (1935), Bugs Bunny Rides Again (1948)
1129	62	"Cats and Mice"	April 13, 2026
Bill and Toony discuss the prevalence of animated cat and mouse duos. Featured cartoons: Mouse Trouble (1944), The Hypo-Chondri-Cat (1950), Gramps to the Rescue (1963), A Fight to the Finish (1947), Road to Andalay (1964)
1130	63	"Face Your Fears"	April 14, 2026
Mr. Quizzer introduces a new segment with creatures. Featured cartoons: The Missing Mouse (1953), A Fish Story (1972), The Sky Is Falling (1947), The House That Jack Built (1939), High Diving Hare (1949)
1131	64	"Trekkin' Dutch Country"	April 15, 2026
Bill and Toony head to the Netherlands on their global tour of the world. Featured cartoons: Happy Holland (1952), Porky's Badtime Story (1937), Little Dutch Plate (1935), The Brave Little Bat (1941), Boobs in the Woods (1950)
1132	65	"The Future of 1956"	April 16, 2026
Bill and Toony revisit the year 1956. Featured cartoons: The High and the Flighty (1956), The Honey-Mousers (1956), After the Ball (1956), Mixed Master (1956), Tweet and Sour (1956)
1133	66	"Happy Birthday, Daffy!"	April 17, 2026
Bill and Toony celebrate the debut of Daffy Duck. Featured cartoons: Porky's Duck Hunt (1937), The Wise Quacking Duck (1943), Duck Dodgers in the 24½th Century (1953), Ducking the Devil (1957), Rabbit Fire (1951)
1134	67	"Perfect Memory"	April 21, 2026
Bill exercises his memory with vintage games. Plus Bill and Toony meet someone with a near perfect memory. Featured cartoons: Portrait of the Artist as a Young Bunny (1980), Betty Boop and Little Jimmy (1936), Lunch with a Punch (1952), Charlie the Rainmaker (1971), Matinee Mouse (1966)
1135	68	"Celebrating Mother Earth"	April 22, 2026
Bill and Toony celebrate mother earth. Featured cartoons: No Parking Hare (1954), Andy Panda's Victory Garden (1942), Growing Pains (1953), The Tree Medic (1955), Gopher Spinach (1954)
1136	69	"Throwback Thursday: 1940"	April 23, 2026
Bill and Toony revisit the year 1940. Featured cartoons: All Hams on Deck (1970), Elmer's Candid Camera (1940), Hello How Am I (1939), Sally Swing (1938), A Corny Concerto (1943)
1137	70	"Trekkin' Old Blighty"	April 24, 2026
Bill and Toony trek to England and meet Laurence Brown from the "Lost in the Pond" podcast. Featured cartoons: Knighty Knight Bugs (1958), Now Hear This (1963), Robin Hoody Woody (1962), I Was a Teenage Thumb (1963), Captain Hareblower (1954)
1138	71	"Semiquintennial of the Bicentennial"	April 27, 2026
Bill and Toony look back at the bicentennial of 1976. Featured cartoons: My Favorite Duck (1942), Mint Men (1960), Popeye for President (1956), My Daddy The Astronaut (1967), Bunker Hill Bunny (1950)
1139	72	"Spider Dan"	April 28, 2026
Bill climbs a building, and Bill and Toony talk to Dan Goodwin AKA "Spider Dan", who famously climbed the Sears Tower. Featured cartoons: Muzzle Tough (1954), Skyscraper Caper (1968), Tots of Fun (1952), The Fuz (1967), Hic-cup Pup (1954)
1140	73	"Trekkin' Espana"	April 29, 2026
Bill and Toony trek to Spain and enjoy a traditional flamenco performance. Featured cartoons: Bully for Bugs (1953), Throwing the Bull (1946), Flies Ain't Human (1941), Mucho Mouse (1957), Nutty Pine Cabin (1942)
1141	74	"It's National Bugs Bunny Day!"	April 30, 2026
Bill and Toony celebrate a day devoted to Bugs Bunny. Featured cartoons: Porky's Hare Hunt (1938), The Hare-Brained Hypnotist (1942), Gorilla My Dreams (1948), Ali Baba Bunny (1957), Wild and Woolly Hare (1959)
1142	75	"Punk Rock Bill"	May 1, 2026
Bill and Toony celebrate the 50th birthday of Punk Rock. Featured cartoons: Bye, Bye Bluebeard (1949), Sick Transit (1966), Cool Cat (1967), Flea for Two (1955), Hare Do (1949)
1143	76	"Tooners' Choice"	May 4, 2026
Tooners take over. Every cartoon is curated by viewers. Featured cartoons: Duck Amuck (1953), The Arctic Giant (1942), Norman Normal (1968), The Spinach Overture (1935), Señor Droopy (1949)
1144	77	"Rival of the Ages VI"	May 5, 2026
Boomers and Zoomers face off in the latest edition of Rival of the Ages. Featured cartoons: The Flying Cat (1952), Guided Muscle (1955), Hawaiian Aye Aye (1964), Lumberjack and Jill (1949), The Abominable Snow Rabbit (1961)
1145	78	"Dome, Sweet Dome"	May 6, 2026
Bill looks at strange places to live. Featured cartoons: Acrobatty Bunny (1946), Woody the Freeloader (1968), The House Builder-Upper (1938), Sleepy-Time Squirrel (1954), Home, Tweet Home (1950)
1146	79	"Trends to the Extreme"	May 7, 2026
Bill and Toony look at extreme trends from the past and present. Featured cartoons: A Fine Feathered Frenzy (1954), Ain't She Tweet (1952), Zip 'N Snort (1961), Bugged by a Bee (1969), Jack-Wabbit and the Beanstalk (1943)
1147	80	"Cheers to Mom!"	May 8, 2026
Bill and Toony celebrate Mother's Day. Plus, last-minute DIY gifts for mom. Featured cartoons: That's My Mommy (1955), Charlie's Mother-in-Law (1963), The Cat Came Back (1936), A Broken Leghorn (1959), Baby Bottleneck (1946)
1148	81	"Catch the Connection III"	May 11, 2026
Figure out the mystery connection between five Golden Age cartoons. Featured cartoons: Buccaneer Bunny (1948), Bad Luck Blackie (1949), The Village Smithy (1936), The Duck Doctor (1952), Scrambled Aches (1957)
1149	82	"All You Can Eat"	May 12, 2026
Bill and Toony meet a competitive eater. Featured cartoons: Don't Axe Me (1958), The Pest That Came to Dinner (1948), The Little Orphan (1949), Happy Go Lucky (1947), Bill of Hare (1962)
1150	83	"New Antiques"	May 14, 2026
Bill and Toony look at some of the hottest trends and trinkets in antique collecting. Featured cartoons: Jerry and the Lion (1950), Tweet Tweet Tweety (1951), Bargain Daze (1953), One Cab's Family (1952), Hare We Go (1951)
1151	84	"If You Build It..."	May 15, 2026
Bill and Toony meet a master Lego builder. Featured cartoons: Hot-Rod and Reel! (1959), Log Rollers (1953), Bridge Ahoy! (1936), Plywood Panic (1953), The Fair-Haired Hare (1951)
1152	85	"Trekkin' Switzerland"	May 18, 2026
Bill and Toony visit Switzerland on the latest stop of their "Trekkin' the Globe" tour. Featured cartoons: Snowbody Loves Me (1964), Corn on the Cop (1965), Thrills and Chills (1938), Snow Place Like Home (1966), A Swiss Miss (1951)
1153	86	"Back In '96!"	May 19, 2026
Bill and Toony revisit the year 1996. Featured cartoons: Hare-Way to the Stars (1958), Bad Bill Bunion (1945), Drag-A-Long Droopy (1954), Feather Finger (1966), War and Pieces (1964)
1154	87	"An Acme Company History"	May 20, 2026
Bill and Toony discover Acme inspired products. Featured cartoons: Porky's Poppa (1938), The Good Egg (1939), Beep Prepared (1961), Design for Leaving (1954), The Hasty Hare (1952)
1155	88	"Bill Gets Glasses"	May 21, 2026
Bill reveals a new look with glasses. Featured cartoons: The Old Grey Hare (1944), Pigeon Holed (1956), Jerry's Cousin (1951), Daffy Duck & Egghead (1938), Bulldozing the Bull (1951)
1156	89	"Turning the Tassel"	May 22, 2026
It's graduation season, so Bill and Toony dig into graduation traditions. Featured cartoons: Little School Mouse (1954), Learn Polikeness (1938), Movie Madness (1951), Bye, Bye, Blackboard (1972), Hot Rods (1953)
1157	90	"Roomies"	May 26, 2026
Bill and Toony look at classic roommate pairings from TV. Featured cartoons: Tick Tock Tuckered (1944), Jerry, Jerry, Quite Contrary (1966), The Hick Chick (1946), Dumb Like a Fox (1964), Scent-imental Romeo (1951)
1158	91	"TV Booms!"	May 27, 2026
Bill and Toony explore the boom in TV programming through the decades. Plus, special guest, LaRoyce Hawkins from Chicago P.D. stops by. Featured cartoons: A Mutt in a Rut (1959), Silly Hillbilly (1949), Wild and Woody! (1948), Rocket Squad (1956), Purr-Chance to Dream (1967); Special Guest Appearance: LaRoyce Hawkins as himself.
1159	92	"Trekkin' Costa Rica"	May 28, 2026
Bill and Toony trek to Costa Rica on their tour of the world. Featured cartoons: Alley to Bali (1954), Bad Ol' Putty Tat (1949), The Shell Shocked Egg (1948), Down and Outing (1961), From Hare to Eternity (1997)
1160	93	"Haunted Road Trip"	June 1, 2026
Toon In with Me kicks off its 2nd annual Juneaween with a haunted road trip. Featured cartoons: Claws for Alarm (1954), The Hitch Hikers (1947), The Duxorcist (1987), The Spinach Roadster (1936), All a Bir-r-r-d (1950)
1161	94	"Lighthouse Terror"	June 2, 2026
Bill and Toony go on a haunted lighthouse tour. Featured cartoons: The Wreck of the Hesperus (1944), Bats in the Belfry (1942), Lighthouse Mouse (1955), Haunted Mouse (1965), Shiver Me Timbers! (1934)
1162	95	"Summer Camp Screams"	June 3, 2026
Bill and Toony spend another summer at camp while talking about horror movie tropes. Featured cartoons: Jumpin' Jupiter (1955), Joe Glow, the Firefly (1941), Getting Ahead (1965), The Witch's Cat (1948), The Flying Sorceress (1956)
1163	96	"Alien Abduction"	June 4, 2026
The Juneaween celebration is heading out of this world as Toony gets abducted by an alien. Featured cartoons: Scaredy Cat (1948), Mad as a Mars Hare (1963), Goons From the Moon (1951), Woodpecker from Mars (1956), Duck Dodgers and the Return of the 24½th Century (1980)
1164	97	"Afraid of the Deep"	June 5, 2026
To end Juneaween, Bill and Toony look at classic horror films from the deep sea. Featured cartoons: Puss 'n' Boats (1966), The Night of the Living Duck (1988), Frankenstein's Cat (1942), King Tut's Tomb (1950), Broom-Stick Bunny (1956)
1165	98	"Celebrating the Seven Seas"	June 8, 2026
Bill and Toony celebrate World Oceans Day. Featured cartoons: Conrad the Sailor (1942), Porky's Five & Ten (1938), Tweety's S.O.S. (1951), Shape Ahoy (1945), Buccaneer Woodpecker (1953)
1166	99	"Toony Retires"	June 9, 2026
Toony has a big announcement. Plus, Bill and Toony chat with the chef behind the iconic cheesecakes on The Golden Girls. Featured cartoons: Sandy Claws (1955), Hula Hula Land (1949), Southbound Duckling (1955), Beauty on the Beach (1950), Hare Conditioned (1945)
1167	100	"The Mr. Quizzer Conspiracy"	June 10, 2026
Bill and Toony explore historic hoaxes. Featured cartoons: Heavenly Puss (1949), The Dead End Cats (1947), Ration Bored (1943), Symphony in Slang (1951), Draftee Daffy (1945)
1168	101	"The Summer I Came of Age"	June 11, 2026
Bill and Toony recall summer coming-of-age flicks and chat with actor Corey Feldman about the 'Stand By Me Live' tour. Featured cartoons: A Star Is Bored (1956), Kiddie League (1959), The Hollywood Bowl (1950), A Tale of Two Kitties (1942), Box-Office Bunny (1991); Special Guest Appearance: Corey Feldman as himself.
1169	102	"The Man in the Moon"	June 15, 2026
Bill and Toony explore moon-inspired myths and beliefs. Featured cartoons: O-Solar Meow (1967), Haredevil Hare (1948), Woodpecker in the Moon (1959), Little Buck Cheeser (1937), Pandora's Box (1943)
1170	103	"Get Your Kicks in '76"	June 16, 2026
Bill and Toony revisit the year 1976. Featured cartoons: The Last Hungry Cat (1961), Unnatural History (1959), Puppet Love (1944), Hair Cut-Ups (1952), Guided Mouse-ille (1967)
1171	104	"Making the Menu"	June 17, 2026
Bill and Toony meet a menu engineer. Featured cartoons: Pests For Guests (1955), Porky Chops (1949), Big Top Bunny (1951), Half Baked Alaska (1965), Stunt Men (1960)
1172	105	"A Day for Dad"	June 19, 2026
Bill and Toony celebrate all the dads out there in honor of Father's Day. Featured cartoons: Birds of a Father (1961), A Bear for Punishment (1951), Born to Peck (1952), My Generation G...G...Gap (2004), Backwoods Bunny (1959)
1173	106	"The Golf Ball Diver"	June 23, 2026
Bill and Toony meet a professional golf ball diver. Featured cartoons: Tee for Two (1945), The Hole Idea (1955), The Tee Bird (1959), It's for the Birdies (1962), Duck Soup to Nuts (1944)
1174	107	"Childhood Beliefs"	June 24, 2026
Bill reminisces about when, as a child, his imagination ran wild. Featured cartoons: Stork Naked (1955), Zoom at the Top (1962), Woody and the Beanstalk (1966), Honeymoon Hotel (1934), 14 Carrot Rabbit (1952)
1175	108	"Bill's-Boards"	June 26, 2026
Toony tries to become a billboard star. Featured cartoons: Daffy Doodles (1946), Accidents Will Happen (1964), Billboard Frolics (1935), Well Oiled (1947), Fast and Furry-ous (1949)
1176	109	"Wedding Season"	July 1, 2026
Bill and Toony learn about wedding traditions from the past and present. Featured cartoons: Hare Trimmed (1953), Cheese It, the Cat! (1957), Hassle in a Castle (1966), Bride and Gloom (1954), His Bitter Half (1950)
1177	110	"Fire-Work"	July 3, 2026
Bill and Toony get ready for the 4th of July. Featured cartoons: Hip Hip-Hurry! (1958), Patriotic Popeye (1957), Those Were Wonderful Days (1934), Plenty of Money and You (1937), Ant Pasted (1953)
1178	111	"Quizzer's Creatures"	July 7, 2026
Mr. Quizzer has a new gig working with wild life. Featured cartoons: Tweet Zoo (1957), The Helpless Hippo (1953), Wild Life (1959), Safari So Good (1947), Apes of Wrath (1959)
1179	112	"Trekkin' Argentina"	July 9, 2026
Bill and Toony explore Argentina. Featured cartoons: Oily Hare (1952), Hold That Rock (1956), Run, Run, Sweet Road Runner (1965), Wolf! Wolf! (1944), The Lion's Busy (1950)
1180	113	"Manifest Upon a Star"	July 10, 2026
Bill explores the power of manifestation. Featured cartoons: Whizzard of Ow (2003), Tweet Dreams (1959), Daffy Dilly (1948), Touché and Go (1957), Jerry's Diary (1949)
1181	114	"What's in a Name?"	July 13, 2026
Bill and Toony explore popular names from different generations. Featured cartoons: Kit for Cat (1948), A Jolly Good Furlough (1943), For Scent-imental Reasons (1949), Fishing by the Sea (1947), The Vanishing Duck (1958)
1182	115	"A Modern Spinoff"	July 15, 2026
Bill and Toony dive into spin-offs. Featured cartoons: Love That Pup (1949), Wild Elephinks (1933), Duck Dodgers in Attack of the Drones (2004), Greedy for Tweety (1957), Devil May Hare (1954)
1183	116	"That's so 3-D"	July 17, 2026
Bill and Toony dive into 3-D films and animation. Featured cartoons: Hypnotic Hick (1953), Triple Trouble (1948), Popeye, the Ace of Space (1953), A Feud There Was (1938), Just Ducky (1953)
1184	117	"It's Hard Out There for a Blimp"	July 20, 2026
Bill and Toony get a blimp. Featured cartoons: Falling Hare (1943), The Stowaways (1949), Goo Goo Goliath (1954), Little Johnny Jet (1953), Clippety Clobbered (1966)
1185	118	"Trekkin' Australia"	July 22, 2026
Bill and Toony explore Australia on the next stop of their "Trekkin' The Globe" tour. Featured cartoons: Bushy Hare (1950), Ocean Bruise (1965), Beaus Will Be Beaus (1955), Bedevilled Rabbit (1957), Mouse-Taken Identity (1957)
1186	119	"Way Back in '66..."	July 23, 2026
Bill and Toony rewind to 1966. Featured cartoons: Two Scent's Worth (1955), I Eats My Spinach (1933), Astronut Woody (1966), Mexican Mousepiece (1966), Sugar and Spies (1966)
1187	120	"Happy 86th, Bugs!"	July 27, 2026
Bill and Toony celebrate Bugs Bunny's 86th birthday. Featured cartoons: A Wild Hare (1940), Hare Trigger (1945), Rabbit Seasoning (1952), Baton Bunny (1959), The Unruly Hare (1945)
1188	121	"Trekkin' Peru"	July 28, 2026
Bill and Toony head to Peru on the next stop of their "Trekkin' The Globe" tour. Featured cartoons: Apes of Wrath (1959), Stealin Aint Honest (1940), Muscle Beach Tom (1956), One Meat Brawl (1947), Aqua Duck (1963)
1189	122	"Dining to Meet You"	July 29, 2026
Bill brings back what it was like to eat out in the 1970s. Featured cartoons: Each Dawn I Crow (1949), Woody Dines Out (1945), Service with a Smile (1964), Gopher Broke (1958), French Rarebit (1951)
1190	123	"Throwback Thursday: 1999"	July 30, 2026
Bill and Toony rewind back to the year 1999. Featured cartoons: Bugs' Bonnets (1956), Shutter Bug (1963), Johann Mouse (1953), The Music Mice-Tro (1967), The House of Tomorrow (1949)
1191	124	"Workplace Nostalgia"	July 31, 2026
Bill longs for an office job of the past. Featured cartoons: The Scarlet Pumpernickel (1950), The Racket Buster (1948), Service with a Smile (1937), Cannery Rodent (1967), A Sheep in the Deep (1962)
1192	125	"On This Day...August 3rd"	August 3, 2026
Bill and Toony hit the nostalgia desk to discuss the biggest events that happened on August 3rd in history. Featured cartoons: Dicky Moe (1962), Porky the Gob (1938), Satisfied Customers (1954), The Super Snooper (1952), Swimmer Take All (1952)
1193	126	"In the Garage"	August 4, 2026
Bill starts a company in his garage. Featured cartoons: Jerry and Jumbo (1953), Mutts About Racing (1958), So Does an Automobile (1939), Nuts and Volts (1964), Hurdy-Gurdy Hare (1950)
1194	127	"The Older Things in Life"	August 6, 2026
Bill educates Toony on the world's oldest living things. Featured cartoons: An Egg Scramble (1950), Filet Meow (1966), The Tree Surgeon (1944), Wimmin Hadn't Oughta Drive (1940), Catty Cornered (1953)
1195	128	"Trekkin' the Land of Smiles"	August 11, 2026
Bill and Toony trek Thailand. Featured cartoons: Mouse and Garden (1960), Smile, Darn Ya, Smile! (1931), The Gay Anties (1947), Gym Jam (1950), The Beach Nut (1944)
1196	129	"One Hour Bill"	August 12, 2026
Old school photography is back, so Bill starts a photomat. Featured cartoons: Elmer's Candid Camera (1940), Watch the Birdie (1958), The Lion Hunt (1949), Road Runner a Go-Go (1965), Daffy Duck in Hollywood (1938)
1197	130	"Behind the Art"	August 13, 2026
Bill and Toony look at the backgrounds that bring cartoons to life. Plus, a professional chalk artist stops by with artwork that pops. Featured cartoons: Going! Going! Gosh! (1952), Robin Hood Daffy (1958), It's Greek to Me-ow! (1961), Tweetie Pie (1947), Baseball Bugs (1946)
1198	131	"Across the Toonyverse"	August 14, 2026
Toony and Bill jump into alternate dimensions. Sliders star Jerry O'Connell stops by to help. Featured cartoons: Dumb Patrol (1964), Designs on Jerry (1955), Trapeze, Pleeze (1960), Don't Give Up the Sheep (1953), No Barking (1954); Special Guest Appearance: Jerry O'Connell as himself.
1199	132	"Toony Bash Day 1"	August 17, 2026
Toony Bash kicks off loaded with live music and fun. Featured cartoons: Hillbilly Hare (1950), Texas Tom (1950), Swing Your Partner (1943), Me Feelins Is Hurt (1940), Hot Noon or 12 O'Clock for Sure (1953)
1200	133	"Toony Bash Day 2"	August 18, 2026
Toony Bash continues with performances from a Chicago-based trio. Featured cartoons: What's Up, Doc? (1950), High Note (1960), Sally Swing (1938), Car of Tomorrow (1951), The Perils of Pearl Pureheart (1949)
1201	134	"Toony Bash Day 3"	August 19, 2026
Toony Bash continues with performances from Ryan Shepard. Featured cartoons: Long-Haired Hare (1949), What Price Fleadom (1948), The Trojan Horse (1946), When My Ship Comes In (1934), Daffy's Inn Trouble (1961)
1202	135	"Toony Bash Day 4"	August 20, 2026
Toony Bash's Day 4 headliner is Holy Joke. Featured cartoons: Banquet Busters (1948), Ballot Box Bunny (1951), To Itch His Own (1958), All's Fair at the Fair (1947), Rock 'n' Rodent (1967)
1203	136	"Toony Bash Finale"	August 21, 2026
Toony Bash concludes with a butter carving contest and performances from The Ike Reilly Assassination. Featured cartoons: Swooner Crooner (1944), The Dippy Diplomat (1945), The Farm of Tomorrow (1954), Let's Sing with Popeye (1934), What's Opera, Doc? (1957)
1204	137	"Varsity Tunes"	August 24, 2026
Bill teaches Toony about good old fashioned American football. Featured cartoons: Lovelorn Leghorn (1951), You Gotta Be a Football Hero (1935), Real Gone Woody (1954), Sport Chumpions (1951), Oily Hare (1952)
1205	138	"Child Prodigies"	August 25, 2026
Bill and Toony explore child prodigies. Plus, a performance by renowned violinist, Rachel Barton Pine. Featured cartoons: Feather Dusted (1955), The Little Wise Quacker (1952), Whiz Quiz Kid (1964), Kiss Me Cat (1953), Cats A-Weigh! (1953); Special Guest Appearance: Rachel Barton Pine as herself.
1206	139	"Animation in the Real World"	August 26, 2026
Bill showcases cartoons that blend live-action with animation, and chats with a star of Coyote vs. Acme. Featured cartoons: The Three Little Pups (1953), You Ought to Be in Pictures (1940), Flying Circus (1968), More Pep (1936), Hook, Line and Stinker (1958); Special Guest Appearance: Eric Bauza as himself.
1207	140	"Fall Planting"	August 27, 2026
Bill's determined to start a garden at the end of summer. Featured cartoons: Pup on a Picnic (1955), Goofy Gophers (1947), The Goofy Gardener (1957), I'll Never Crow Again (1941), Chili Corn Corny (1965)
1208	141	"Bigger Better Bill"	August 28, 2026
Bill sees how far he can trade up. Featured cartoons: Bowery Bugs (1949), Customers Wanted (1939), Timid Tabby (1957), Tugboat Granny (1956), People Are Bunny (1959)
1209	142	"Celebrating Foghorn Leghorn"	August 31, 2026
Bill and Toony celebrate the debut of Foghorn Leghorn. Featured cartoons: Walky Talky Hawky (1946), Crowing Pains (1947), Raw! Raw! Rooster! (1956), Superior Duck (1996), Little Boy Boo (1954)
1210	143	"I'm Bringing '06 Back"	September 2, 2026
Bill and Toony look back at the memes, movies, and music that made 2006 memorable. Featured cartoons: Dog Pounded (1954), Whoa, Be-Gone! (1958), The Early Bird Dood It! (1942), Cat Feud (1958), Lighter Than Hare (1960)
1211	144	"Trekkin' Italy"	September 3, 2026
Bill and Toony are headed to Italy. Featured cartoons: See Ya Later Gladiator (1968), Sunny Italy (1950), A Pizza Tweety-Pie (1958), The Cat and the Mermouse (1949), Roamin' Roman (1964)
1212	145	"Old Normal"	September 4, 2026
Bill and Toony look back at things that were once completely normal but seem strange today. Featured cartoons: Pre-Hysterical Hare (1958), The Cat Above and the Mouse Below (1964), Ceiling Hero (1940), Dime to Retire (1955), The Solid Tin Coyote (1966)
1213	146	"Forgotten Characters"	September 7, 2026
Bill and Toony remember animated characters that some may have forgotten. Featured cartoons: Pecos Pest (1955), Lady, Play Your Mandolin! (1931), Stork Naked (1955), Alvin's Solo Flight (1961), Beep Prepared (1961)
1214	147	"Shatner Beams Down!"	September 8, 2026
The one and only William Shatner joins to celebrate the 60th anniversary of Star Trek. Featured cartoons: Daffy Rents (1966), Shot and Bothered (1966), Rocket Racket (1962), Rocket to Mars (1946), Hare-Way to the Stars (1958); Special Guest Appearance: William Shatner as himself.
1215	148	"Well, That's Convenient"	September 9, 2026
Bill and Toony look at convenience culture. Featured cartoons: Hopalong Casualty (1960), Porky's Bear Facts (1941), House Hunting Mice (1947), A Peck O'Trouble (1953), The Redwood Sap (1951)
1216	149	"Trekkin' the Bahamas"	September 10, 2026
Bill and Toony head to the Bahamas. Featured cartoons: Yankee Doodle Daffy (1943), Poop Deck Pirate (1961), The Disillusioned Bluebird (1944), Fish and Slips (1962), Captain Hareblower (1954)
1217	150	"Tooners Pick the Toons IV"	September 11, 2026
Tooners take over choosing all of the cartoons. Featured cartoons: Rabbit Fire (1951), Cellbound (1955), The Man on the Flying Trapeze (1934), Quentin Quail (1946), Is There a Doctor in the Mouse? (1964)
1218	151	"Longest Game Ever"	September 14, 2026
Bill and Toony find themselves wrapped up in the longest game ever. Featured cartoons: Piker's Peak (1957), Early to Bet (1951), The Leghorn Blows at Midnight (1950), Firemen's Brawl (1953), Goony Golfers (1948)
1219	152	"Unsolicited Advice"	September 15, 2026
Bill and Toony shell out advice. Featured cartoons: Forward March Hare (1953), Hairied and Hurried (1965), Quackodile Tears (1962), Birds Anonymous (1957), Baby Bottleneck (1946)
1220	153	"Trekkin' Croatia"	September 16, 2026
Bill and Toony explore Croatia. Featured cartoons: Knights Must Fall (1949), What's Sweepin' (1953), Out and Out Rout (1966), Trap Happy (1946), Weasel Stop (1956)
1221	154	"Wile E. Coyote & Road Runner"	September 17, 2026
Bill and Toony celebrate the debut of Wile E. Coyote and the Road Runner. Featured cartoons: Beep, Beep (1952), Hare-Breadth Hurry (1963), Ready, Set, Zoom! (1955), Rushing Roulette (1965), Soup or Sonic (1980)
1222	155	"Movie Magic"	September 18, 2026
Bill and Toony determine what makes movies memorable. Plus, actor Robert Hays from the classic comedy, Airplane! stops by. Featured cartoons: Matinee Mouse (1966), The Film Fan (1939), Messed Up Movie Makers (1966), Hospitaliky (1937), Box-Office Bunny (1991); Special Guest Appearance: Robert Hays as himself.
1223	156	"Charlie Chattin'"	September 22, 2026
Bill and Toony celebrate the 50th anniversary of Charlie's Angels with special guest Jaclyn Smith. Featured cartoons: Foxy by Proxy (1952), Secret Agent Woody Woodpecker (1967), Law and Order (1950), A Fox in a Fix (1951), Cat and Dupli-cat (1967); Special Guest Appearance: Jaclyn Smith as herself.
1224	157	"Just a Couple of Conlangers"	September 23, 2026
Bill and Toony decide to create a new language. Featured cartoons: Dr. Devil and Mr. Hare (1964), How to Stuff a Woodpecker (1960), Fastest with the Mostest (1960), Porky's Building (1937), Cue Ball Cat (1950)
1225	158	"Trekkin' France"	September 24, 2026
Bill and Toony head to France. Featured cartoons: Napoleon Bunny-Part (1956), The Flea Circus (1954), Heaven Scent (1956), Royal Cat Nap (1958), Hook, Line and Stinker (1969)
1226	159	"Golden Age of Musicals"	September 25, 2026
Bill and Toony look at the Golden Age of musicals. Featured cartoons: A Hare Grows in Manhattan (1947), Broadway Bow Wow's (1954), Taming the Cat (1948), Past Perfumance (1955), Good Noose (1962)
1227	160	"Hotel Toony-for-ya"	September 28, 2026
Toony opens a hotel with a lot of help from Bill. Featured cartoons: Little Rural Riding Hood (1949), Pesty Guest (1965), Porky's Hotel (1939), Dancing Shoes (1949), A Pest in the House (1947)
1228	161	"An Apple a Day"	September 29, 2026
Bill and Toony celebrate the beginning of fall with apples. Featured cartoons: Apple Andy (1946), Cat Trouble (1947), Fair and Worm-er (1946), Popeye Meets William Tell (1940), Knight-mare Hare (1955)
1229	162	"Animated Villains"	September 30, 2026
Bill and Toony look at villains in animation. Featured cartoons: Professor Tom (1948), For Better or Nurse (1945), Quack Shot (1954), Honey's Money (1962), Spaced Out Bunny (1980)
1230	163	"Trekkin' Germany"	October 1, 2026
Bill and Toony head to Germany. Featured cartoons: By Word of Mouse (1954), Knighty Knight Bugs (1958), The Crackpot King (1946), The Cuckoo Clock (1950), The A-Tom-inable Snowman (1966)
1231	164	"Oz in Animation"	October 2, 2026
Bill and Toony look back at the many Wizard of Oz cartoons over the decades. Featured cartoons: Fowl Weather (1953), Happy Landing (1949), Cobs and Robbers (1953), Feud with a Dude (1968), Springtime for Thomas (1946)
1232	165	"Small Town America"	October 5, 2026
Bill and Toony explore small towns across America. Featured cartoons: Paying the Piper (1949), The Shooting of Dan McGoo (1945), The Two Barbers (1944), One Horse Town (1968), A Kiddies Kitty (1955)
1233	166	"Here's Granny!"	October 7, 2026
Bill and Toony celebrate the debut of Granny. Featured cartoons: Canary Row (1950), Hare Force (1944), Hare Trimmed (1953), A Bird in a Bonnet (1958), Museum Scream (2003)
1234	167	"Air Show Daredevils"	October 8, 2026
Bill and Toony head to an air show. Featured cartoons: Just Plane Beep (1965), Hot Air Aces (1949), Plane Dippy (1936), Private Eye Pooch (1955), Duck Amuck (1953)
1235	168	"Humour in America"	October 9, 2026
Bill and Toony look at British comedy in America. Featured cartoons: Hollywood Daffy (1946), Now Hear This (1963), The Fox Hunt (1950), Under the Counter Spy (1954), Bunker Hill Bunny (1950)
1236	169	"(Shake, Shake, Shake) Shake Your Toony"	October 13, 2026
Boogie back to the disco era. Featured cartoons: Book Revue (1946), Moose on the Loose (1952), Pecking Holes in Poles (1972), He Dood It Again (1943), Jerry and the Goldfish (1951)
1237	170	"Bill Gets Social"	October 15, 2026
Toony helps Bill create content for his new social media. Featured cartoons: Stupor Duck (1956), Keep in Style (1934), Ah, Sweet Mouse-Story of Life (1965), Popeye Presents Eugene the Jeep (1940), Trip for Tat (1960)
1238	171	"Catch the Connection IV"	October 16, 2026
Can you figure out the connection between all of today's cartoons? Featured cartoons: Rabbit Romeo (1957), One Cab's Family (1952), International Woodpecker (1957), Mouse for Sale (1955), Red Riding Hoodwinked (1955)
1239	172	"It's Spooky Season"	October 19, 2026
Bill and Toony gear up for Halloween reminiscing about nostalgic traditions. Plus, a pumpkin carver shows off some spooky creations and a mixologist whips up scary, spirit-free cocktails. Featured cartoons: Timid Tabby (1957), Jumpin' Jupiter (1955), Midnight Frolics (1938), Spooky Swabs (1957), Science Friction (1963)
1240	173	"The Toony Chainsaw Mishap"	October 20, 2026
Bill's magic trick of sawing Toony in half goes wrong. Good thing a professional magician is here to help. Featured cartoons: Hot Cross Bunny (1948), Witch Crafty (1955), Prest-O Change-O (1939), The Bird Came C.O.D. (1942), A Witch's Tangled Hare (1959)
1241	174	"Spooky Scaries"	October 21, 2026
Bill faces his childhood fears. Plus, author R.L. Stine behind the massive children's horror phenomenon Goosebumps stops by. Featured cartoons: Switchin' Kitten (1961), The Night of the Living Duck (1988), Fowled-Up Party (1957), Big Game Haunt (1968), Fright to the Finish (1954); Special Guest Appearance: R.L. Stine as himself.
1242	175	"The Toys That Haunt Us"	October 22, 2026
Bill receives a Halloween gift from Toony, the newest talking doll on the market, Gabby Gus. All is normal until Gus begins to act strangely around Bill and Toony. Featured cartoons: Broom-Stick Bunny (1956), Hiccup Hound (1963), Voo-Doo Boo-Boo (1962), Imagination (1943), Hyde and Go Tweet (1960)
1243	176	"One Night At Toony's"	October 23, 2026
When Bill purchases an abandoned pizza parlor, the animatronic mascot comes alive. Featured cartoons: Mouse Trouble (1944), Franken-Stymied (1961), Betty Boop's Penthouse (1933), The Electronic Mouse Trap (1946), Hair-Raising Hare (1946)
1244	177	"Scary Tales"	October 26, 2026
Bill and Toony uncover the dark secrets of fairy tales and make an unsettling discovery on set. Featured cartoons: Bewitched Bunny (1954), Yankee Dood It (1956), Getting Ahead (1965), Woody's Magic Touch (1971), Hansel and Gretel (1952)
1245	178	"Polterguys"	October 27, 2026
The studio is haunted by a wicked spirit. But it just might be the ghost of someone familiar... Featured cartoons: Water, Water Every Hare (1952), The Hitch Hikers (1947), Birth of a Notion (1947), Haunted Mouse (1965), A-Haunting We Will Go (1966)
1246	179	"A Haunting Premonition"	October 28, 2026
Bill and Toony try to decode a vague message they receive from a tarot card reader. Featured cartoons: The Hare-Brained Hypnotist (1942), Mighty Mouse Meets Jekyll and Hyde Cat (1944), Ghosks Is the Bunk (1939), Phantom of the Horse Opera (1961), Dr. Jerkyl's Hide (1954)
1247	180	"Count Billcula"	October 29, 2026
Toony puts Bill through a series of tests to prove that he is, indeed, a bloodsucking undead ghoul. Plus, Dark Shadows star Kathryn Leigh Scott stops by to talk about the iconic show's 60th anniversary. Featured cartoons: Gypsy Life (1945), Bats in the Belfry (1942), Claws for Alarm (1954), Monster of Ceremonies (1966), Transylvania 6-5000 (1963); Special Guest Appearance: Kathryn Leigh Scott as herself.
1248	181	"Frankenquizzer"	October 30, 2026
Mr. Quizzer retells the classic horror tale with his own game show spin. Featured cartoons: The Hasty Hare (1952), Frankenstein's Cat (1942), The Flying Sorceress (1956), Shiver Me Timbers! (1934), Hyde and Hare (1955)
1249	182	"Small Towns, Big Screen Connections"	November 3, 2026
Bill and Toony explore small towns across America. Featured cartoons: Rabbitson Crusoe (1956), Mighty Mouse Rides Again (1943), A Fractured Leghorn (1950), Posse Cat (1954), Porky's Super Service (1937)
1250	183	"How Iconic"	November 4, 2026
Bill and Toony look at iconic TV characters. Featured cartoons: Stage Door Cartoon (1944), Fiesta Fiasco (1967), The Cat Concerto (1947), Gee Whiz-z-z-z-z-z-z (1956), Bad Ol' Putty Tat (1949)
1251	184	"Bill and Toony Make a Training Video"	November 5, 2026
After Bill and Toony discover old educational films, they decide to make their own how-to for cartoon curating. Featured cartoons: Lickety-Splat (1961), Cartoons Ain't Human (1943), Smarty Cat (1955), Papa's Little Helpers (1952), Muscle Tussle (1953)
1252	185	"Tooners Pick the Toons V"	November 6, 2026
Tooners take over choosing all of the day's cartoons. Featured cartoons: Bully for Bugs (1953), Dog Tax Dodgers (1948), The Uninvited Pests (1946), Robin Hood Makes Good (1939), Woody Woodpecker (1941)
1253	186	"The Great Treasure Hunt"	November 9, 2026
Bill and Toony hunt for treasure. Featured cartoons: Tease for Two (1965), Half Empty Saddles (1958), Dizzy Divers (1935), Heir Bear (1953), Buccaneer Bunny (1948)
1254	187	"The Bill-Mo-Bill"	November 10, 2026
Bill buys an old school bus and decides to make Toon In with Me ... on Wheels. Featured cartoons: Stop! Look! And Hasten! (1954), The Bus Way to Travel (1964), Daffy's Southern Exposure (1942), Busman's Holiday (1961), Barbary Coast Bunny (1956)
1255	188	"Saluting the Brave"	November 11, 2026
Bill and Toony celebrate and honor our veterans. Featured cartoons: Falling Hare (1943), I'm in the Army Now (1936), Wacky Blackout (1942), Ant Pasted (1953), Conrad the Sailor (1942)
1256	189	"Route 66 Centennial"	November 12, 2026
Bill and Toony celebrate 100 years of Route 66. Featured cartoons: No Parking Hare (1954), Hot-Rod and Reel! (1959), Blind Date (1953), What-- No Spinach? (1936), Advance and Be Mechanized (1967)
1257	190	"Unlucky 13"	November 13, 2026
Bill and Toony try to disspell the bad luck that comes with Friday the 13th. Featured cartoons: Hare and Loathing in Las Vegas (2004), Bad Luck Blackie (1949), Mutiny Ain't Nice (1938), Mouse Trapped (1959), Lotsa Luck (1968)
1258	191	"Toon In with Me on Ice"	November 16, 2026
Toon In with Me takes over the ice with a mesmerizing performance. Featured cartoons: Down with Cats (1943), The Blue Danube (1939), Mice Follies (1954), Thrills and Chills (1938), 8 Ball Bunny (1950)
1259	192	"Bill Gets His Letter"	November 17, 2026
Bill earns his first varsity letter. Featured cartoons: Much Ado About Mousing (1964), Blackboard Jumble (1957), The Dover Boys at Pimento University (1942), Count Me Out (1938), Cat's Paw (1959)
1260	193	"Mini-Miniseries"	November 18, 2026
Bill and Toony look back at classic TV miniseries. Featured cartoons: Hare Splitter (1948), Little Beau Pepé (1952), Get Rich Quick Porky (1937), McDougal's Rest Farm (1947), Pappy's Puppy (1955)
1261	194	"Cartoon Evolution"	November 19, 2026
Bill and Toony look at how animation has changed over the decades. Featured cartoons: Rabbit Rampage (1955), More Pep (1936), I Haven't Got a Hat (1935), The Flying Cat (1952), Duck Dodgers and the Return of the 24½th Century (1980)
