= Mutiny on the Bunny =

1950 film by Friz Freleng

- Title card
- Directed by: I. Freleng
- Story by: Tedd Pierce
- Starring: Mel Blanc
- Music by: Carl Stalling
- Animation by: Gerry Chiniquy; Ken Champin; Virgil Ross; Arthur Davis
- Layouts by: Hawley Pratt
- Backgrounds by: Paul Julian
- Color process: Technicolor
- Production company: Warner Bros. Cartoons
- Distributed by: Warner Bros. Pictures
- Release date: February 11, 1950
- Running time: 7:33
- Language: English

Mutiny on the Bunny is a 1950 Warner Bros. Looney Tunes cartoon directed by Friz Freleng. The short was released on February 11, 1950, and stars Bugs Bunny and Yosemite Sam.

It is one of three nautical-themed shorts with Sam as a pirate, along with Buccaneer Bunny (1948) and Captain Hareblower (1954). The title is a reference to the film Mutiny on the Bounty (1935).

== Plot ==
Set in 18th-century England, the film centers on Yosemite Sam's attempts to commandeer a ship, the "Sad Sack," for his own mischievous purposes. He coerces Bugs Bunny into joining as a crew member under false pretenses of a free voyage around the world. Once aboard, Bugs realizes he has been duped and engages in a series of comedic confrontations with Sam. Their antics include Bugs tricking Sam into relinquishing his authority by feigning a shipwreck, only to have Sam retaliate with various schemes for vengeance. These range from attempting to sink Bugs with the ship's anchor disguised as a baby to mistakenly causing the ship to sink while searching for buried treasure.

Despite Sam's repeated efforts to sabotage Bugs, each endeavor results in his own downfall, culminating in the destruction of the ship. Despite Sam's persistent repairs and retaliations, Bugs ultimately emerges victorious, leaving Sam defeated and surrendering to Bugs' whims as they set sail into the sunset.

== Cast ==
- Mel Blanc as Bugs Bunny, Yosemite Sam

== See also ==
- List of Bugs Bunny cartoons
- List of Yosemite Sam cartoons

| Preceded by Hurdy-Gurdy Hare | Bugs Bunny Cartoons; 1950 | Succeeded by Homeless Hare |
