= Porky's Pooch =

1941 film by Robert Clampett

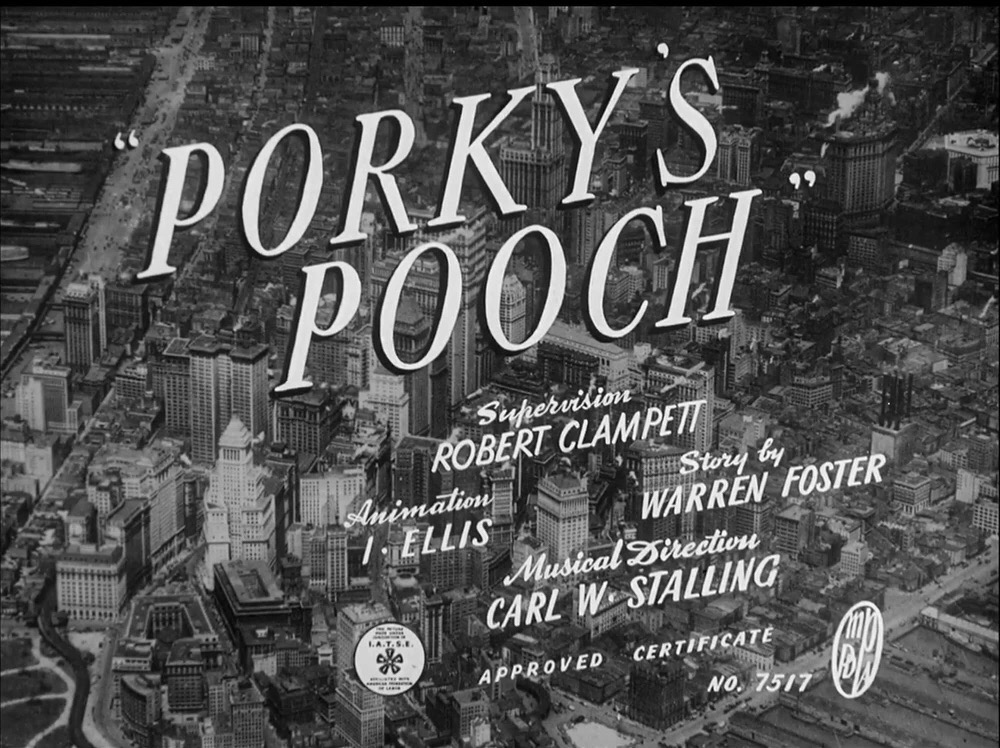
- Title card
- Directed by: Robert Clampett
- Story by: Warren Foster
- Produced by: Leon Schlesinger
- Starring: Mel Blanc; Sara Berner (both uncredited)
- Music by: Carl W. Stalling
- Animation by: Isadore Ellis
- Color process: Black-and-white
- Production company: Leon Schlesinger Productions
- Distributed by: Warner Bros. Pictures
- Release date: December 27, 1941
- Running time: 7 min
- Country: United States
- Language: English

Porky's Pooch is a 1941 American animated comedy short film directed by Robert Clampett. The short was released on December 27, 1941. It is part of the Looney Tunes series and the 95th cartoon to feature Porky Pig. It is the last cartoon to be directed by Clampett in his old unit, as Norman McCabe took over his unit the same year after Clampett took over Tex Avery's former unit.

The short was remade in 1947 by Chuck Jones as Little Orphan Airedale, which introduced the finalized and recognizable character of Charlie Dog. Jones noted that Charlie Dog was directly based on the dog Rover in Porky's Pooch, though they are distinct characters.

== Plot ==
A stray Scottish dog Sandy is starving as he watched a worker, who appears to be a dog, flipping pancakes. He exits to find his friend Rover having found a master. Rover recounts finding his way to Porky's apartment; Porky is the first to not immediately throw him out, but does not want a dog. Rover continuously pesters Porky to adopt him and exaggerates his usefulness, but is met with disinterest. He persistently guilt trips Porky into adopting him, until he falls off the building. Porky finally responds by attempting to stop him from landing on the pavement to no avail. It is not known if Rover's new owner is Porky.

== Home media ==
Porky's Pooch is available in the Looney Tunes Golden Collection: Volume 5 and Porky Pig 101 DVD sets.

== See also ==
- Little Orphan Airedale
- Looney Tunes and Merrie Melodies filmography (1940–1949)
- Porky Pig filmography
- List of animated films in the public domain in the United States
