= Bugs Bunny Rides Again =

1948 film by Friz Freleng

- Title card
- Directed by: I. Freleng
- Story by: Tedd Pierce; Michael Maltese
- Starring: Mel Blanc; Robert C. Bruce; Michael Maltese; Tedd Pierce
- Music by: Carl Stalling
- Animation by: Gerry Chiniquy; Manuel Perez; Ken Champin; Virgil Ross
- Layouts by: Hawley Pratt
- Backgrounds by: Paul Julian
- Color process: Technicolor
- Production company: Warner Bros. Cartoons
- Distributed by: Warner Bros. Pictures; The Vitaphone Corporation
- Release date: June 12, 1948
- Running time: 7:11
- Language: English

Bugs Bunny Rides Again is a 1948 Merrie Melodies animated short directed by Friz Freleng. The short was released on June 12, 1948, and stars Bugs Bunny and Yosemite Sam.

The animated short is both a Western and a parody of the genre's conventions.

Voice characterizations are performed by Mel Blanc. It is the third cartoon to pair Bugs and Yosemite Sam, after Hare Trigger (1945) and Buccaneer Bunny (1948). The title is a typical Western reference, as in "The Lone Ranger rides again", and also suggests a reference to the Jack Benny comedy, Buck Benny Rides Again (1940).

== Plot ==
Underscored by a high-energy version of "Cheyenne", a constant hail of bullets flies around the Western town of Rising Gorge. A stream of them sail one way along the main street; a traffic light (an Acme Regulator, in keeping with Looney Tunes tradition) turns red and those bullets hover in mid-air while another torrent of them shoot by on the cross street, though they hesitate to resume when they get the green light when one last bullet zips past on the cross street, running the red light. Inside the Gunshot Saloon ('Come in and get a slug') at the bar a cowboy shoots another, apparently only for his drink. Outside there is a commotion and women screaming, then Yosemite Sam, guns smoking in his hands, walks in (being so short, he passes beneath the saloon doors). The patrons react with fear, yelling his name as the score quotes from Erlkönig (as is often the case for villains in Looney Tunes).

Sam orders everyone ("all you skunks") out of the place, firing his guns for emphasis. All comply (including an actual skunk), except one cowboy Sam catches trying to sneak out the back and turns into a shooting gallery target. He demands to know if there is anyone there who dares to think they might tame him. Bugs Bunny, lazily leaning against a wall and rolling a cigarette declares, "I aims to."

The two approach each other in exaggerated gunfighter fashion. When they are literally nose-to-nose, Bugs unholsters a carrot and delivers his classic, "What's up, Doc?" Sam says, "This town ain't big enough for the two of us." Bugs tries to accommodate him by instantly building an entire city skyline, but Sam is not appeased. They then draw on each other with increasingly larger-cylinder-capacity guns (seven-shooter, eight-shooter, etc.) until Sam makes it to a 'ten shooter'. Bugs then pulls out a pea shooter; Sam reacts to the pea-shot bounced off his nose by opening fire. Bugs runs outside, right into Sam who, in typical Western parlance, demands the rabbit "Dance!" as he fires bullets at his feet.

Bugs performs a soft shoe routine; entertainment-style, he turns the 'floor' over to Sam who does a routine of his own. As he dances 'off stage', Bugs opens the door to a mine shaft which Sam then falls into. ("Tsk tsk tsk. Poor little maroon. So trusting. So naïve.") When Sam returns to the surface and is immediately confrontational, Bugs draws lines in the sand, each time daring Sam to step over them. Sam does so, for quite a distance, until he falls off a cliff. During Sam's fall, Bugs places a mattress at the bottom saying, "Me conscience bodders me sometimes", before taking the mattress away ("But not dis time!") and letting Sam crash to the bottom. The two end up on horseback, Sam giving chase, through a series of gags until Bugs suggests they play cards, as is common in "the Western pictures" to determine who leaves town.

The two play gin rummy, and Bugs wins the game (by cheating); he rushes Sam onto the stagecoach to the train station accompanied by a rushed rendition of Cheyenne. As he is shoving Sam onto the train, they discover that the passenger car is the Miami Special, full of swimsuit-clad women heading for a beauty contest. Accompanied by a rendition of Oh You Beautiful Doll fit for a striptease number, the plot twist completely changes the tone. Bugs fights with Sam to be the one boarding the train, and prevails (to the strains of Aloha Oe) as usual, with lipstick-kisses on his face shouting, "So long, Sammy! See ya in Miami!"

== Production Note ==
Yosemite Sam's statement when he first enters the saloon - "the roughest, toughest he-man stuffest hombre that's ever crossed the Rio Grande, and I don't mean Mahatma Gandhi" is changed in some versions of the film to "And I ain't no namby pamby" instead of "Mahatma Gandhi." This modification was likely due to Gandhi's assassination five months before the cartoon's release.

== Voice cast ==
- Mel Blanc as Bugs Bunny, Yosemite Sam, Skunk
- Robert C. Bruce as Cowboy
- Michael Maltese and Tedd Pierce as crowd ad-libs

== Music ==
Because the film is organized as "one gag after the next", rather than clearly defined narrative segments of exposition, climax, and conclusion, Carl Stalling created a series of short musical cues accompanying and fitting each scene or gag. A total of 18 such cues appear in this short.

The title music is a short sample of the "William Tell Overture" (1829) by Gioachino Rossini. The establishing shot for Rising Gorge, the name of the town of the film, is accompanied with a sample of "Cheyenne" (1906) by Egbert Van Alstyne and Harry Williams. The establishing shot for the saloon and its customers is accompanied with a sample of Navajo (1903), also by Van Alstyne and Williams. The entry of Yosemite Sam is accompanied by a sample of Erlkönig (1821) by Franz Schubert. When Bugs Bunny emerges as the only one willing to stand against Sam, the music is a sample of Yosemite Sam, a song created by Stalling himself.

When Sam and Bugs start their duel, the music is a sample of Inflamatus, a section of the Stabat Mater (1841) by Rossini. When Sam states that the town is not big enough for the two of them, the music is a sample of Sonata Pathétique (1799) by Ludwig van Beethoven. The dancing scene is set to the tune of Untitled Soft-Shoe Number, which was also heard with a similar dance in Stage Door Cartoon, and the fall of Sam down the mine shaft to the tune of Wise Guy. Both were compositions by Stalling himself. When Sam rages following his fall, the music is a sample of the act 3 prelude to Siegfried (premiered 1876) by Richard Wagner. (Goldmark attributes the Siegfried reference to a later appearance in Wagner's Götterdämmerung.)

When the two rivals exit the town, the music is a sample of Fighting Words by Stalling, while the horse chase is set to another sample of the William Tell Overture. When the two rivals agree to play cards, the music is The Loser by Stalling. Part of the card playing is set to a sample of My Little Buckaroo by M.K. Jerome and Jack Scholl. The victory of Bugs and the rush towards the train station is set to another sample of "Cheyenne". The scene with the bathing beauties is set to the tune of Oh, You Beautiful Doll (1911) by Nat Ayer and Seymour Brown. When Bugs subdues Sam, the music is Miami Special by Stalling. Finally, the train leaves to the tune of Aloha ʻOe (1878) by Liliuokalani.

In part, Stalling relied on the musical codes of the Western genre. "Cheyenne", My Little Buckaroo, Navajo, and the William Tell Overture were already associated with the Old West, cowboys, and cattle, and were familiar to audiences. Der Erlkönig, the Inflamatus, and the Sonata Pathétique fit the function of generic dramatic or agitated music used in genre films. In contrast, the titular tune of Bugs Bunny Rides Again is styled after the music of vaudeville shows.

The full version of Finale part of "William Tell Overture" would be used in 2008 rhythm game Looney Tunes: Cartoon Conductor.

== Critical reception ==
The animated parody short received favourable critical response. Animator historian Greg Ford praised the musical accompaniment to the horse chase, and author Piotr Borowiec describes it as "Probably the funniest cartoon starring Bugs Bunny and Yosemite Sam". In Cartoon Carnival: A Critical Guide to Best Cartoons, writer Michael Samerdyke considers it as "one of Friz Freleng's best."

== Home media ==
- VHS - Bugs Bunny Classics: Special Collectors Edition
- VHS - Bugs Bunny's Zaniest Toons
- VHS - The Golden Age Of Looney Tunes Volume 10: The Art Of Bugs
- Laserdisc - Bugs Bunny Classics: Special Collectors Edition
- Laserdisc - The Golden Age of Looney Tunes Volume 1
- DVD - Looney Tunes Golden Collection: Volume 2
- Blu-Ray - Bugs Bunny 80th Anniversary Collection

== See also ==
- Looney Tunes and Merrie Melodies filmography (1940–1949)
- Bugs Bunny filmography
- Yosemite Sam filmography

Preceded by Buccaneer Bunny	Bugs Bunny cartoons 1948	Succeeded by Haredevil Hare

Preceded by Buccaneer Bunny	Yosemite Sam cartoons 1948	Succeeded by High Diving Hare
