= Land of the Midnight Fun =

1939 film by Fred Avery

- Title card
- Directed by: Fred Avery
- Story by: Melvin Millar
- Produced by: Leon Schlesinger
- Starring: Mel Blanc; Sara Berner; Tex Avery
- Narrated by: Robert C. Bruce
- Music by: Carl W. Stalling
- Animation by: Charles McKimson
- Color process: Technicolor
- Production company: Leon Schlesinger Productions
- Distributed by: Warner Bros. Pictures
- Release date: September 14, 1939; (earliest known date)
- Running time: 8 min
- Country: United States
- Language: English

Land of the Midnight Fun is a 1939 American animated comedy short film directed by Fred Avery. The short was released as early as September 14, 1939. It is part of the Merrie Melodies series. It is the first film in the series to be animated by Charles McKimson, who joined his brothers a few years late and become one of Robert's most prominent animators. It is rarely shown on television or released on home media due to racial stereotypes of Inuit.

== Plot ==
An icebreaker cruise ship travels from New York City to Nome, Alaska, literally sticking to the coastline while traveling. Its staff attempts to rescue a seemingly shipwrecked man, who refuses rescue as he voluntarily sets off to sea with his partner. The ship travels through shaky waters and eventually crosses through iceberg with help from staff literally chiseling the ice. As the ship arrives at Nome, the anchor literally falls, while the passengers obliviously walk down the entrance (which had not stopped near the shore) to the sea.

In Nome, an Eskimo man literally wears his canoe while fishing and roasts fish in his comically small igloo. An Eskimo couple rub noses instead of kissing, with the woman applying lipstick on her nose. Three dogs pull a dog sled before stopping to pee at a telephone pole. A timber wolf literally yells "Timber!" for no apparent reason which also confuses him. A penguin jumps into the water to eat fish twice, only to be eaten by a fish on the third try. Finally, an Eskimo nightclub is introduced, with a rotoscoped ice skater performing a musical number; the nights are apparently six months long. The ship leaves, and gets caught in the fog near New York City; when the fog clears, the ship is perched atop the World's Fair Trylon.

== Home media ==
- LaserDisc – The Golden Age of Looney Tunes, Volume 4, Side 7
- DVD – Allegheny Uprising (USA 1995 Turner print included as a bonus)
