= Charlie Dog =

Warner Bros. theatrical cartoon character

- Looney Tunes/Merrie Melodies character
- First appearance: Prototype: Porky's Pooch (1941); Official: Little Orphan Airedale (1947)
- Created by: Bob Clampett (prototype); Chuck Jones (official)
- Voiced by: Mel Blanc (1941–1947, 1958); Larry Storch (1972); Frank Welker (1990–present); Joe Alaskey (1997); Eric Bauza (2021–2026)

In-universe information
- Species: Mixed-breed dog
- Gender: Male

Charlie Dog (also known as Rover, Charlie, and sometimes Charles the Dog) is an animated cartoon character in the Warner Bros. Looney Tunes and Merrie Melodies series of cartoons. The character was featured in six cartoons between 1947 and 1958. He is generally characterized as a wise-guy type.

== Development ==
Bob Clampett minted the scenario that Charlie Dog would later inherit in his cartoon short Porky's Pooch, first released on December 27, 1941. In that cartoon, a homeless hound pulls out all the stops to get adopted by bachelor Porky Pig. Mel Blanc provided the dog's gruff, Brooklyn-Bugs Bunny-like voice and accent which became Charlie's standard voice.

== History ==
As he did for other Looney Tunes characters, Chuck Jones took Clampett's hound and reworked him, with the help of writer Michael Maltese. Jones first used the dog in Little Orphan Airedale (October 4, 1947) which saw Clampett's "Rover" renamed "Charlie." The film was a success, and Jones would create two more Charlie Dog/Porky Pig cartoons in 1949: Awful Orphan (January 29) and Often an Orphan (August 13). Jones also starred Charlie without Porky in a couple of shorts: Dog Gone South (August 26, 1950) which sees Yankee Charlie searching for a fine gentleman of the Southern United States, and A Hound for Trouble (April 28, 1951) which sends Charlie to Italy where he searches for a master who speaks English.

In these cartoons, Charlie Dog is defined by one desire: to find himself a master. To this end, Charlie is willing to pull out all the stops, from pulling "the big soulful eyes routine" to boasting of his pedigree ("Fifty percent Collie! Fifty percent setter, Irish Setter! Fifty Percent Boxer! Fifty percent Doberman Pinscher! Fifty percent Pointer—dere it is! Dere it is! Dere it is! But, mostly, I'm all Labrador Retriever!"); when reminded by others that he is not a Labrador retriever, his response would be, "Look, if you doubt my woid, get me a Labrador and I'll retrieve it for you. Dat's fair, isn't it?" — though in reality, he is just a slick-talking mutt who rarely realizes that his own aggressive obnoxiousness is sabotaging his appeal to any potential guardian. He is called "the most obnoxious salesman on four legs". He believes that everybody needs a dog to call their own, and he tackles all sorts of schemes to find a home. Especially in the Porky Pig shorts, the pig would usually try to mail him out of the country, usually accompanied by Porky laughing evilly and maniacally, only to have Charlie return dressed in the costume of that place he was sent, which would make Porky even more determined to get rid of him.

Charlie has a verbal quirk which recurs. If a word contains another word in full, he will say it like that...vege-TABLE. Immi-GRANT.

Charlie makes a brief cameo appearance (via re-used animation from Often an Orphan) in the Bob McKimson-directed short Dog Tales (1958). Jones shelved the Charlie Dog series of films in the 1950s, along with characters he had himself introduced, such as The Three Bears and Hubie and Bertie. He was turning his efforts to new characters, such as Pepé Le Pew and Wile E. Coyote and the Road Runner.

The Frisky Puppy character that Jones paired with Claude Cat in several '50s shorts bears a close physical resemblance to Charlie.

== Later appearances ==
Recent Warner Bros. merchandising and series and films such as episodes of Tiny Toon Adventures, and Space Jam (1996) feature Charlie in the crowd scenes, one in which he throws a basketball to Lola Bunny, The Sylvester and Tweety Mysteries in the episode Yelp (here performed by Joe Alaskey), and Tweety's High-Flying Adventure (2000) in Italy have brought Charlie back out of retirement. In Looney Tunes: Back in Action (2003), he can be spotted playing poker with other Looney Tunes dogs and at the end of the film bringing Bugs a plate of fruit, and in Space Jam: A New Legacy (2021), he can be seen briefly in Bugs Bunny's flashback leaving Tune World way in the front row with other Looney Tunes.

Charlie Dog made a cameo in The Looney Tunes Show episode "Father Figures." He was seen in a pet store where he was attacked by Henery Hawk (who was looking for a chicken at the time when Porky Pig was being a father figure to him). Charlie Dog appears in Looney Tunes Cartoons (voiced by Eric Bauza) in the episode "Adopt Me" and in the movie Coyote vs. Acme, where he works as a clerk at the Avery, Jones & Maltese law firm.
