= Dog Tales (film) =

- Directed by: Robert McKimson
- Story by: Tedd Pierce
- Starring: Mel Blanc; Mary Jane Croft (uncredited)
- Narrated by: Robert C. Bruce (uncredited)
- Edited by: Treg Brown
- Music by: Milt Franklyn
- Animation by: George Grandpré; Ted Bonnicksen; Warren Batchelder; Tom Ray
- Layouts by: Robert Gribbroek
- Backgrounds by: Richard H. Thomas
- Color process: Technicolor
- Production company: Warner Bros. Cartoons
- Distributed by: Warner Bros. Pictures; The Vitaphone Corporation
- Release date: July 26, 1958
- Running time: 6:04
- Language: English

Dog Tales is a Warner Bros. Looney Tunes animated cartoon directed by Robert McKimson. The short was released on July 26, 1958 and features cameo appearances of Charlie Dog and Yosemite Sam in the former's final appearance in a Warner Bros. cartoon.

== Plot ==
The cartoon consists of a series of blackout gags involving dogs (e.g., one in which a Doberman Pinscher viciously pinches an overweight U.S. Army private identified as "Doberman" (a reference to, and caricature of, the character played by Maurice Gosfield on The Phil Silvers Show); and another in which the narrator can't make up his mind whether the dog pictured is a pointer or a setter, and then finally shows a picture of a "point-setter"). A Basset Hound declares that she's a TV star (a reference to Cleo the Dog, from the contemporary TV sitcom The People's Choice, who was also voiced by Mary Jane Croft), we learn the unusual breed of a Newfoundland puppy's grandfather (the "Oldfoundland"), and a Great Dane named "Victor Barky" plays the piano. Reused animation from Chuck Jones' Often an Orphan (1949) and Friz Freleng's Piker's Peak (1957) is also seen here. In the former case, Charlie Dog makes a cameo - his final appearance in a Warner Bros. cartoon as well as his only cartoon to not be directed by Chuck Jones. Yosemite Sam is shown in the latter case - one of his only three shorts to not be directed by Friz Freleng.

One gag is a backhanded reference to Disney's animated feature, Lady and the Tramp, which was released around three years before this short. The narrator (Robert C. Bruce) solemnly intones "Today, the dog appears in countless varieties of artificially produced breeds," while the screen shows drawings of a Russian Wolfhound, a Bulldog, an American Cocker Spaniel, a Pekingese, a Chichuahua, a Scottish Terrier, and a Dachshund—all of them nearly identical in their 'artificial' depiction to dogs from the Disney film (Boris, Bull, Lady, Peg, Pedro, Jock, and Dachsie), where they all (with the exception of Peg, played by Peggy Lee) speak English with stereotypical accents associated with their breeds' countries of origin.

The final gag is a collie named Laddie (a play on words and a male spoof of Lassie) travelling the state through forests, mountains and rivers from the North to his home in California to return to his home and retrieve his "prized possession". As his owner comes out to embrace his pet, Laddie dashes past his owner and stops at a tree where he buried his "prized possession", a bone, digs it out of the ground and kisses it to end the cartoon.
