= Robert C. Bruce =

American actor (1914–2003)

- Born: Robert Cameron Bruce Jr. October 6, 1914; White Salmon, Washington, U.S.
- Died: August 24, 2003 (aged 88); Greenville, South Carolina, U.S.
- Resting place: Sunset Memorial Park Cemetery; Minneapolis, Minnesota, U.S.
- Other name: Bob Bruce
- Occupation: Actor
- Years active: 1930s–1960s
- Spouse: Catharine Burnap (m. 1939; died 2001)
- Children: 3

Robert Cameron Bruce Jr. (October 6, 1914 – August 24, 2003) was an American voice actor and the son of Robert Cameron Bruce (1887–1948) who was a cinematographer and documentary producer. He was the narrator for a number of Warner Bros. Cartoons shorts in the 1930s and 1940s. The Looney Tunes and Merrie Melodies series' had occasional entries which were driven not by one of their stable of stars such as Bugs Bunny or Daffy Duck, but by individual short sketches, usually filled with sight gags and word-play. Later he was a writer and producer of industrial motion pictures based in Minnesota.

== Career ==
Bruce spent two and a half years doing nine shows a week on WMCA and he later moved to Hollywood where he landed a job on KFWB, the Warner Bros. radio station, and was one of the four regulars on the show alongside Arthur Q. Bryan, Jack Lescoulie, and Alan Ladd. Bruce did four or five shows a week at $5 a show and got a job providing voice work for Leon Schlesinger's cartoon studio as the building was in the same place where Bruce performed his radio work. Bruce was used as a narrator in most of the cartoons that were directed by Tex Avery, Bob Clampett, and Chuck Jones. Besides providing narration, Bruce was also heard as several characters in a few cartoons including "Dangerous Dan McFoo" where he voiced a dog with a cigarette and a referee. Bruce would record his dialogue on an empty stage with the director, writer and engineer in a booth up near the ceiling explaining the cartoon to him and would record his lines afterwards. In addition for working for Warner Bros. Cartoons, Bruce also provided voice work for Walter Lantz's cartoon studio and for George Pal's Puppetoons series. From 1950 to 1951, Bruce was an actor on the TV show NBC Comics where he played characters on two of the shows "Kid Champion" and "Space Barton". Later, he had a company based in Minnesota known as Robert C. Bruce Productions where he produced and wrote industrial films and commercials. He was a former president of Minnesota Heart Association, was president of American Federation of Radio and Television Artists, and was a member of Pioneers of Radio. In the late sixties, he retired to a home in South Carolina.

== Animation voiceover work ==
- Dangerous Dan McFoo (1939) as Narrator/Referee/Dog with Cigarette
- Detouring America (1939) as Narrator
- Land of the Midnight Fun (1939) as Narrator
- Fresh Fish (1939) as Narrator
- The Film Fan (1939) as Coming Attractions Narrator
- Pilgrim Porky (1940) as Narrator
- The Bear's Tale (1940) as Narrator
- The Hardship of Miles Standish (1940) as Radio Announcer/Grandpa
- A Gander at Mother Goose (1940) as Narrator
- The Chewin' Bruin (1940) as Old Timer
- Ceiling Hero (1940) as Narrator
- Wacky Wildlife (1940) as Narrator
- Porky's Snooze Reel (1941) as Narrator
- Fair Today (1941) as Narrator
- Farm Frolics (1941) as Narrator
- Salt Water Daffy (1941) as Narrator
- Meet John Doughboy (1941) as Citizen Sugar Cane & Narrator
- We, the Animals Squeak! (1941) as Narrator (title card only)
- Aviation Vacation (1941) as Narrator
- The Bug Parade (1941) as Narrator
- Who's Who in the Zoo (1942) as Narrator
- Crazy Cruise (1942) as Narrator
- Hobby Horse-Laffs (1942) as Narrator
- Fox Pop (1942) as Radio Announcer

Point Rationing of Foods, a 1943 animated propaganda short narrated by Bruce

- The 500 Hats of Bartholomew Cubbins (1943) as Narrator
- Fin'n Catty (1943) as Narrator (beginning and ending only)
- What's Cookin' Doc? (1944) as Opening Narrator
- Russian Rhapsody (1944) as Radio Announcer
- Brother Brat (1944) as Narrator
- Buckaroo Bugs (1944) as Narrator and Villagers
- Plane Daffy (1944) as Narrator
- The Weakly Reporter (1944) as Narrator
- Wagon Heels (1945) as Narrator
- Nasty Quacks (1945) as Narrator
- Book Revue (1946) as Henry VIII
- Bacall to Arms (1946) as Narrator
- Of Thee I Sting (1946) as Narrator
- Fair and Worm-er (1946) as Narrator
- Hobo Bobo (1947) as Narrator and New Yorkers
- Crowing Pains (1947) as Barnyard Dawg
- Bugs Bunny Rides Again (1948) as Cowboy (uncredited)
- Swallow the Leader (1949) as Narrator
- Orange Blossoms for Violet (1952) as Narrator
- Punch Trunk (1953) as Narrator/Psychiatrist/Radio Announcer
- Feline Frame-Up (1954) as Filbert
- Gone Batty (1955) as Narrator
- The Hole Idea (1955) as Narrator
- Bugs' Bonnets (1956) as Opening Narrator
- Dog Tales (1958) as Narrator
- Bonanza Bunny (1959) as Narrator

== List of Private Snafu shorts voiced by Robert C. Bruce ==
- Booby Traps (1944)
- Outpost (1944)
- Target Snafu (1944)
- A Few Quick Facts: Fear (1945)
- It's Murder, She Says... (1945)
- Private Snafu Presents Seaman Tarfu in the Navy (1946)

== Legacy ==
Bruce never got a screen credit, but his voice was recognizable, and he is mentioned in the commentary for the Looney Tunes Golden Collection.

He introduces the cartoon What's Cookin' Doc? (1944) which begins with a filmed segment about Oscar night, and transitions into a Bugs Bunny cartoon.

In the last scene of the cartoon Punch Trunk (1953), Bruce is "Mr. Pratt", a TV station announcer who introduces the audience to a distinguished science lecturer (voiced by Mel Blanc) named "Dr. Robert Bruce Cameron"—a play on Bruce's own name.

In addition to the "Crazy Cruise" types of cartoons, he provides the voice of the narrator for the 1956 cartoon Bugs' Bonnets, an animated exposition on the "well-known psychological fact that people's behavior is strongly affected by the way they dress".

== See also ==
- Looney Tunes and Merrie Melodies filmography
  - Looney Tunes and Merrie Melodies filmography (1929–1939)
  - Looney Tunes and Merrie Melodies filmography (1940–1949)
  - Looney Tunes and Merrie Melodies filmography (1950–1959)
  - Looney Tunes and Merrie Melodies filmography (1960–1969)
  - Looney Tunes and Merrie Melodies filmography (1970–present)
- Looney Tunes Golden Collection
