= Of Thee I Sting =

- Directed by: Friz Freleng
- Story by: Michael Maltese
- Based on: Target Snafu by Frank Tashlin
- Narrated by: Robert C. Bruce
- Music by: Carl Stalling
- Animation by: Ken Champin; Gerry Chiniquy; Manuel Perez; Virgil Ross
- Layouts by: Hawley Pratt
- Backgrounds by: Terry Lind
- Color process: Technicolor
- Production company: Warner Bros. Cartoons
- Distributed by: Warner Bros. Pictures
- Release date: August 17, 1946
- Running time: 7 minutes 6 seconds
- Language: English

Of Thee I Sting is a 1946 Warner Bros. Looney Tunes cartoon directed by Friz Freleng, written by Michael Maltese and narrated by Robert C. Bruce that is a parody of World War II documentaries. The short was released on August 17, 1946.

Much of the material was reused from the Private Snafu cartoon Target: Snafu. The title is a play on Of Thee I Sing.

== Plot ==
In Target for Tonight-style (a diagram of the target is actually stamped "Target for Tonight" by an officer mosquito), a narrator briefs the audience on a mosquito attack upon a hapless man enjoying a day on a screened porch. It goes from (under)ground school to field training against "enemy" countermeasures such as insecticides and swatters, takeoffs from improvised "aircraft carriers" made from a sardine can with a cigarette lighter as its superstructure and other military weapons.

The mosquitoes return to their bases after a successful mission, to the strains of the theme song of the film Captains of the Clouds. As they approach an aircraft carrier, they are misled into a swamp by a cross-eyed mosquito who is the signalman on the flight deck.

== Home media ==
The short is available on disc 1 of the Looney Tunes Collector's Vault: Volume 3 Blu-ray set.
