= Awful Orphan =

1949 film by Chuck Jones

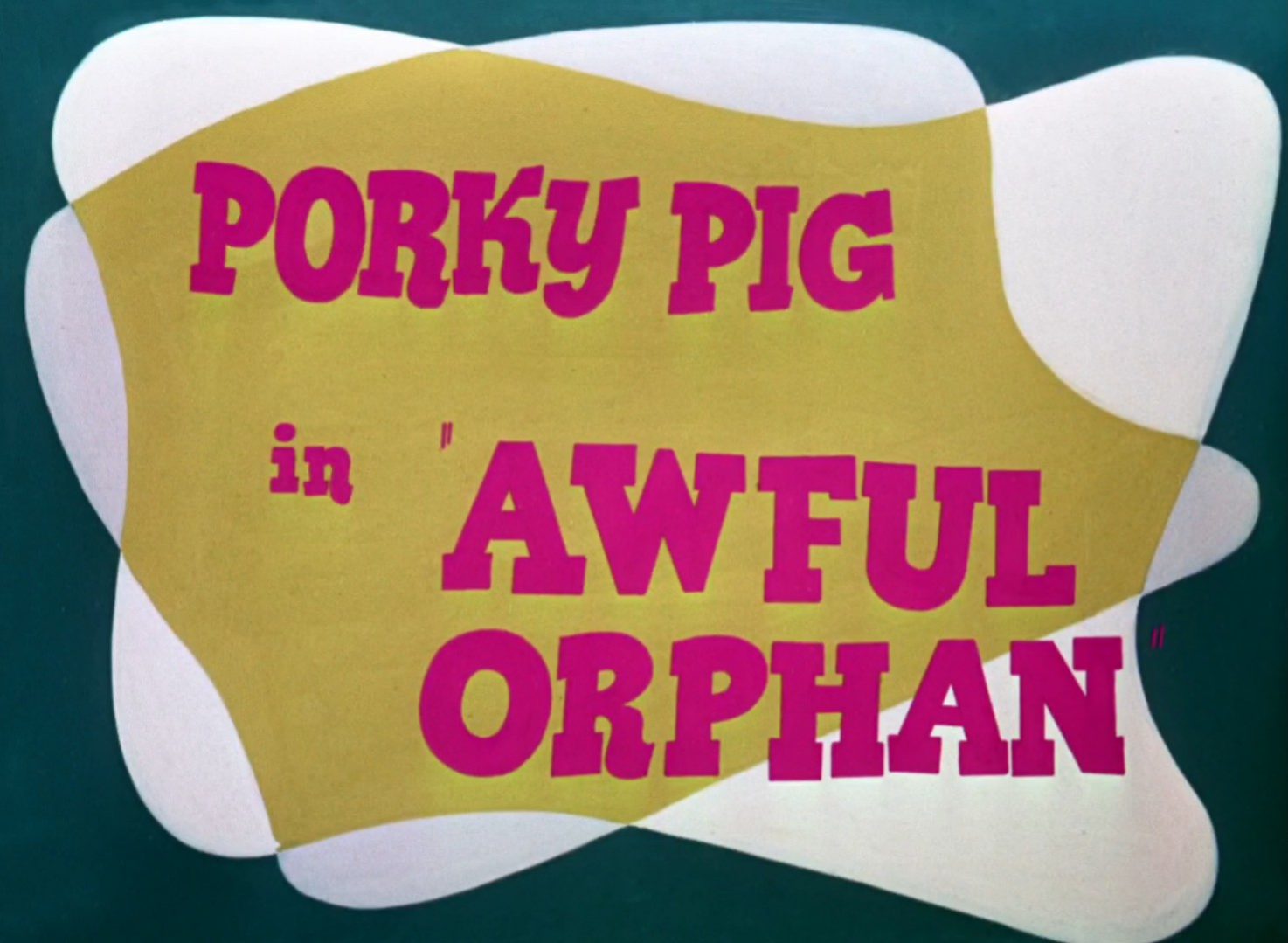
- Title card
- Directed by: Charles M. Jones
- Story by: Michael Maltese
- Starring: Mel Blanc
- Music by: Carl Stalling
- Animation by: Phil Monroe; Ben Washam; Lloyd Vaughan; Ken Harris
- Layouts by: Robert Gribbroek
- Backgrounds by: Peter Alvarado; Philip DeGuard (reused backgrounds, uncredited)
- Color process: Technicolor
- Production company: Warner Bros. Cartoons
- Distributed by: Warner Bros. Pictures; The Vitaphone Corporation
- Release date: January 29, 1949 (U.S.)
- Running time: 7:26
- Country: United States
- Language: English

Awful Orphan is a 1949 Warner Bros. Merrie Melodies cartoon, directed by Chuck Jones and written by Michael Maltese. It is a sequel to the 1947 Looney Tunes short Little Orphan Airedale.

== Plot ==
Charlie has a crowd around him as he uses a stick in his mouth to turn pages over on a flip board. Each page dramatically builds on the theme that there is something these people should have in their home. When the last page reveals that the to-be-desired item is Charlie, the people who have been watching angrily leave in disgust. Charlie then stows away in a pet shop truck which makes a delivery to Porky's hotel room. Porky ordered a canary, but when he removes the cage covering it is Charlie, crammed into the cage. Porky proceeds to dial the pet store to complain, he discovers he is actually talking to Charlie, who has pulled the telephone wire from the wall and is speaking through it.

Porky throws the dog out several times but each time, Charlie returns to demonstrate how wonderful he would be to have around. He even pretends to be a baby left in a basket outside the door. Porky leads Charlie on for a minute, then kicks the entire basket down the hall. Disguised as an old lady, Charlie hits Porky with an umbrella while berating him for being a brute to an innocent baby. Porky ends up being chased out of the room; he knocks angrily until Charlie opens the door. At this point, Porky demands the dog get out once and for all. Charlie conducts a fake suicide by jumping from the window onto an unlikely stack of mattresses piled up from the street. Frustrated, Porky slams the window and closes the curtains.

Porky initially believes the next knock on his door is Charlie, but it is his lunch, and he prepares to dig in. When he lifts the warming lid, Charlie is trussed up on the plate. Porky is holding a knife and the dog puts on an over-the-top performance begging Porky not to use it on him. He promises to do several chores if he is allowed to stay. Porky appears to give in. Pretending to be pinning a paper pattern for the coat onto Charlie, Porky succeeds in wrapping the dog up for mailing, and sticks a label on him reading, "To Siberia". In spite of being stuffed into a mailbox, Charlie returns wearing traditional clothing and, while doing the Cossack dance, kicks Porky in the rear end until he ejects him into the hall. The upstairs neighbor phones threatening to come down to stop the noise. Charlie responds by counter-threatening the man. He tricks Porky into going upstairs, and the man beats him up.

The man then drops off the injured Porky, who finally submits to making Charlie his pet. However, Charlie has changed his mind and as he starts to leave, Porky finally snaps and forces him to stay. The screen fades to black, then the cartoon returns with a scene similar to an earlier one, but with the roles of dog and master reversed. Charlie tries to sneak away, but Porky's growls force him back into the chair.

== Home media ==
Awful Orphan was released on DVD in 2003 on disc 3 of Looney Tunes Golden Collection: Volume 1. It was later released on Blu-ray in 2026 on disc 2 of Looney Tunes Collector's Vault: Volume 2.

== See also ==
- Porky Pig filmography
- Looney Tunes and Merrie Melodies filmography (1940–1949)
