= Unnatural History (film) =

- Directed by: Abe Levitow
- Story by: Michael Maltese
- Starring: Mel Blanc; June Foray (uncredited); Ed Prentiss (uncredited)
- Edited by: Treg Brown
- Music by: Milt Franklyn
- Animation by: Ben Washam; Keith Darling; Richard Thompson
- Layouts by: Bob Singer
- Backgrounds by: Bob Singer
- Color process: Technicolor
- Production company: Warner Bros. Cartoons
- Distributed by: Warner Bros. Pictures
- Release date: November 14, 1959
- Language: English

Unnatural History is a 1959 Warner Bros. Merrie Melodies cartoon directed by Abe Levitow, with a story by Mike Maltese. The short was released on November 14, 1959. The cartoon is made up of blackout gags with no real story tying them together, similar to many cartoons directed by Tex Avery.

== Plot ==
Professor Beest Lee (a pun on "beastly") narrates over clips of animals and their quirky behavior. Scenes include:

- An ant rolling a round object from one anthill to another. However, in actuality, the hills are connected to the same tunnel.
- An orangutan (or the great ape) that sees a banana hanging from the ceiling, but uses nearby giant blocks and a saw to cut a hole in the ceiling of his cage to pull down a fridge full of food.
- A mouse that scares an elephant but is then scared by a tiny elephant (in a throwback to Punch Trunk).
- A running gag showing a dog, named Rover, patiently waiting on the front porch for his master that hasn't been home in three long, lonesome years.
- Inside a food processing factory, a hen lays cube-shaped eggs, much to the chagrin of another hen ("Showoff!").
- A man who proclaims to an entertainment agent his dog can talk whereas all the dog's answers are "ruff", particularly for the answers to the top of a house (roof), the owner's name (Ralph) and the greatest baseball player (Ruth). When the agent throws them out, the dog picks himself up, dusts himself off, and asks his owner: "Maybe I should've said DiMaggio?"
- Another scene with Rover lying in wait. ("Faithful friend, good dog.")
- A rabbit (John, who looks like Bugs Bunny) sent into space and returning with an alien wife (Martian) and kids.
- A groundhog who uses advanced technology to predict the weather.
- A chameleon named Cal who can blend into different unicolor screens but cannot bring himself to attempt a multi-color plaid screen: ("I can't do it!! I just CAN'T do it!!!")
- Another scene with Rover waiting for his master through a terrible storm (and a bit of a cold).
- The classic "trained pigeons" gag (used previously in Curtain Razor and Show Biz Bugs) in which the trainer's pigeons, when released from their cage, fly past the table of miniature obstacles and out the window.
- A hospital room with a dog who has his bandaged leg. The veterinarian unravels the wraps and finds a cat biting the victim's foot and won't let go. (The scene is somewhat reused in the Tom and Jerry cartoon, The Cat's Me-Ouch.)
- A beaver literally "damming" a river when a piece of the structure breaks off.
- Spring, in the forest, where a pair of birds, skunks (the male resembling Pepé Le Pew), and bears are cheek to cheek in love, including a pair of porcupines kissing and then yelp in pain from the quills. ("All but very carefully...")
- Back to the running gag, Rover's master is finally home, but gets an unfriendly reception at the cartoon's end (the master turning out to be Beest Lee himself). The dog then angrily questions Beest Lee’s motives for leaving him “locked out to starve for three years”, threatens to beat him up and turn him in for animal cruelty, and demands his supper because he is starved.
