= Sally Swing =

- Directed by: Dave Fleischer
- Produced by: Max Fleischer
- Starring: Margie Hines; Rose Marie
- Animation by: Willard Bowsky; Gordon A. Sheehan
- Color process: Black-and-white
- Production company: Fleischer Studios
- Distributed by: Paramount Pictures
- Release date: October 14, 1938
- Running time: 7 minutes
- Country: United States
- Language: English

Sally Swing is a 1938 Fleischer Studios animated short film in Max Fleischer's Betty Boop series. The short features the voice talents of Rose Marie as Sally Swing and Margie Hines as Betty Boop.

== Synopsis ==
At the examination board, Betty asks the men if they do acrobatics or performing arts. Unfortunately, after they ended up trying a song ("Goodnight, Ladies"), Betty then auditions people to become bandleaders for tonight's college dance. She finally discovers a cleaning woman as the leader of the band by conducting and singing her song. Betty asks Sally to play the rest of the song continuously by annoying badly the principal of the college (Sally calls him "professor" at the end of the film).
