= Captain Hareblower =

- Lobby card
- Directed by: I. Freleng
- Story by: Warren Foster
- Starring: Mel Blanc
- Music by: Carl W. Stalling
- Animation by: Manuel Perez; Ken Champin; Virgil Ross; Arthur Davis
- Layouts by: Hawley Pratt
- Backgrounds by: Irv Wyner
- Color process: Technicolor
- Production company: Warner Bros. Cartoons
- Distributed by: Warner Bros. Pictures; The Vitaphone Corporation
- Release date: January 16, 1954
- Running time: 7:03
- Language: English

Captain Hareblower is a 1954 Warner Bros. Merrie Melodies theatrical cartoon short directed by Friz Freleng and written by Warren Foster. The short was released on January 16, 1954, and stars Bugs Bunny and Yosemite Sam.

This is the third of the three and final Warner Bros. shorts (the others being Buccaneer Bunny and Mutiny on the Bunny) in which Yosemite Sam is featured as a pirate, as well as the only one that is in the Merrie Melodies series. It is the only cartoon of the three in which both Bugs and Sam lose.

== Plot ==
A one-man Pirate crew Captain Yosemite Sam is sailing over an ocean on his ship singing "Blow the Man Down". Sam looks through a telescope and sees a trading sailship nearby. Captain Yosemite Sam reveals his new desire to steal the ship for himself. He fires a warning shot from his cannon and lines up side-by-side with the ship ordering its surrender. Since Sam is a legendary intimidating pirate, the crew on the other ship surrender and abandon it. The captain and crew flee in fear at seeing "Sam the Pirate".

Bugs Bunny, lying in a box filled with carrots, hears the commotion on the ship and says to himself jokingly "Sam the Pirate", as that does not sound like a very intimidating name. Sam boards and Bugs says "Ahoy there! What's up doc?" Sam orders Bugs to surrender the ship. Bugs replies with "Surrender? Never hoid of the woid. So you'll have to try to take the ship!" Sam simply responds with a warning shot through Bugs' Napoleonic hat and between his ears, leaving a lump on Bugs' head ("Now, he should know better than that!").

Bugs and Captain Sam battle each other in a fierce duel. Bugs first manages to find and shoot Sam first ("Blast, ya rabbit! Two can play that game!"), and when Sam tries to himself, he ends up being shot again, much to his annoyance.

When Sam is filling his cannons and firing them, Bugs wanders onto Sam's ship and shoots Sam as he is filling one, turning Sam into a pile of rubble.

Later, Sam tries the same method on Bugs but this time, the cannon instead launches backwards into Sam, shooting himself out of the ship's side.

Next, Sam then tries to swing aboard Bugs' ship. ("Prepare to defend yourself, rabbit, cuz I'm a-boarding your ship! Charge!") However, there is another cannon in Sam's path resulting in him landing in the cannon. The cannon fires as Sam tries to retreat (much like in Bunker Hill Bunny).

Then, Sam then makes a model sailship using a barrel of dynamite. He lights it and blows into the sail to push the ship towards Bugs' ship. Bugs tries to blow the explosive model ship back to no avail and then uses an electric fan to blow the ship back towards Sam; when Sam tries to blow it back it explodes when it reaches his face.

Then Sam dresses up in a diving suit, lights a fuse to a bomb and dives underwater. When he is swimming towards Bugs' ship with the bomb, a fish comes up from behind and eats Sam. Seconds later the bomb detonates and blows up the fish, leaving only its shock-faced skeleton behind and Sam himself burned and dazed from the explosion.

Sam eventually corners Bugs on the crow's nest of Bugs' ship. Sam tells Bugs to surrender but Bugs challenges Sam to climb up and get him first. Sam in reply uses an axe to chop down the mast and to avoid being hurt by the falling mast Sam takes cover when it is almost completely cut apart. When it remains still balanced on its last chunk holding it up, Sam walks under the rested mast to chop the final chunk of it off but before he can react the mast falls on itself and crushes Sam.

Sam eventually climbs out of the mast, gets back in shape and glares up at Bugs. He climbs up the net ladders and corners Bugs on the rigging ("A-ha! Now I got ya, ya fur-bearin' critter!"). Bugs decides to take a dive in the ocean instead of facing Sam. When Sam tries to dive after Bugs he lands head-first onto a rock and falls in the water in massive pain.

Sam gives a final warning to Bugs once back on ship. Bugs Bunny tosses a lighted match into the powder room of Sam's ship. Sam frantically retrieves the match and tells Bugs "Ya doggone idjit galut! You'll blow the ship to smithereenies! And if ya does that once more, I ain't a-goin' after it!" Bugs uses this stubbornness as an advantage to throw another match into the powder room forcing Sam to stand and wait like he said he would. After a few seconds, Sam changes his mind and runs after the match but by the time he does so, the ship blows up (similar to Buccaneer Bunny). An injured, ragged, burnt Sam is blown onto Bugs' ship. To retaliate, Sam lights a match himself and tosses it into Bugs' ship powder room ("What's good for the goose is good for the gander!"). Bugs however refuses to go after it and realizing that Bugs is serious, Sam panics, dives from the ship and swims off. Bugs Bunny reveals that his powder room is actually a make-up room, commenting "I don't know what he's so excited about. Talcum powder doesn't explode." However this is proven false as after Bugs reveals the room, the ship blows up to smithereens, as well. As a defeated Bugs is tossed in the air he sadly stares as he says "I could be wrong, you know."

== See also ==
- List of Bugs Bunny cartoons
- List of Yosemite Sam cartoons

Preceded by Robot Rabbit	Bugs Bunny Cartoons; 1954	Succeeded by Bugs and Thugs
