= Cheyenne (1906 song) =

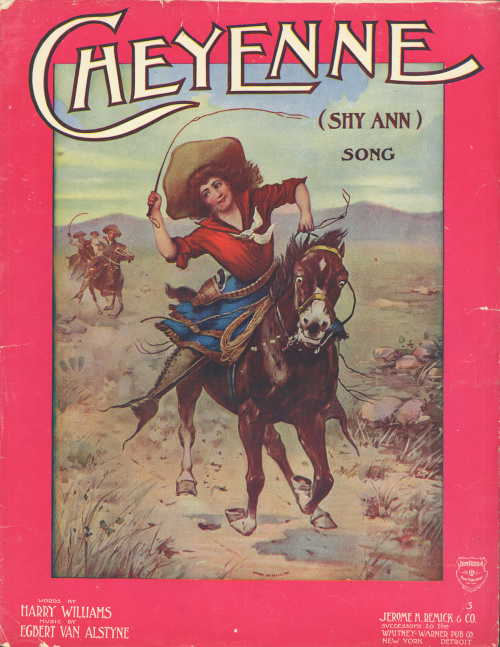
- Sheet music cover, 1906

Song
- Published: 1906
- Composer: Egbert Van Alstyne
- Lyricist: Harry Williams

"Cheyenne" is a popular and sentimental song written in 1906, with words by Harry Williams and music by Egbert Van Alstyne. It became a hit for a number of artists. The chorus is:

Shy Ann, Shy Ann, hop on my pony,
There's room here
For two dear,
But after the ceremony,
We'll both ride back home dear, as one,
On my pony, from old Cheyenne.

== Other uses ==
The song became a staple of the underscore of western films, to the point of being stereotyped. It also lent itself well to parody.

In the 1943 cartoon "Yankee Doodle Daffy", Daffy Duck puts on a cowboy hat and rides Porky Pig like a horse, as the exasperated pig is trying to get rid of and away from the annoying duck, who sings these not-overly-clever lyrics to the same tune:

I'm a cowboy
Yes, sir, I am
Yes, sir, I am a cowboy
Yes, sir, I am
I'm a cowboy
Yes, sir, I am
Yes, sir, I am a cow-ow-boy

At the time the song was first popular, scandals about conditions in meat-packing plants were in the news. Billy Murray, who had also recorded a "straight" version of the song, recorded a biting parody about a diseased horse that was targeted for such a plant. The chorus:

Cheyenne, Cheyenne, you sick old pony
We'll take you
And bake you
And make you into baloney
And the folks who eat you won't know
You're that pony from old Cheyenne

== Bibliography ==
- Williams, Harry; Van Alstyne, Egbert. "Cheyenne" (sheet music). New York: Jerome H. Remick & Co. (1906).
