= Punch Trunk =

- Title card
- Directed by: Charles M. Jones
- Story by: Michael Maltese
- Starring: Mel Blanc; Robert C. Bruce; Marian Richman (uncredited)
- Music by: Carl Stalling
- Animation by: Ken Harris; Lloyd Vaughan; Ben Washam
- Layouts by: Maurice Noble
- Backgrounds by: Philip DeGuard
- Color process: Technicolor
- Production company: Warner Bros. Cartoons
- Distributed by: Warner Bros. Pictures; The Vitaphone Corporation
- Release date: December 19, 1953
- Running time: 7:01
- Language: English

Punch Trunk is a 1953 Warner Bros. Looney Tunes cartoon written by Mike Maltese and directed by Chuck Jones. The short was released on December 19, 1953. The title is a play on the expression "punch drunk".

== Plot ==
A five-inch-tall dwarf elephant stows away on a banana shipment, which arrived on the S.S. Michael Maltese, to an unnamed city. Several skits follow showing the elephant appearing in random places, with people and other animals reacting to it with screams of terror. Mistaken for hallucinations, sightings of the tiny elephant lead to chaos. The short ends with a television broadcast of a scientist trying to calm the public by dismissing its existence. The elephant then shows up at the station; the scientist fails to notice it, but the host does and ends the broadcast by disagreeing with the scientist's claims and subsequently faints in horror. The elephant finally trumpets to the camera as the cartoon ends.

== Legacy ==
The tiny elephant makes a cameo in the Merrie Melodies short Unnatural History directed by Abe Levitow, released six years later.

The cartoon was edited into Daffy Duck's Quackbusters, the credits of the film mistakenly calling it "Punch Truck". Here, it begins from the bird bath scene and leaves out the scenes concerning the high-rise apartment, the circus, the cat, and the flagpole. The film's version of the bird bath scene has the bird bath owner phoning up Daffy Duck to report the elephant, which leads Daffy to send the orderlies to pick the bird bath owner up having deemed him "definitely _non compos mentis_ "; the elephant's height here is also stated to be "5¼ inches tall". The newspaper headlines had been swapped around so that they are shown in this order; "Mass Hallucination Grips City", "Picayune Pachyderm Panics Populace", "Hundreds Claim To Have Seen Tiny Elephant" and "I Seen It". The last headline had been changed from "Noted Scientist to Take to Air to Calm Alarmed Citizenry" to "Sightings of Tiny Elephant Continue" to tie in with the story; Daffy, having read of the mass panic from the last headline, made a backfired attempt to disprove the tiny elephant's existence that resulted in him being "publicly disgraced on a coast-to-coast hookup!" when during his interview on Frightline with Zed Toppel, the elephant walked by Daffy (Daffy halfway noticing the elephant before the elephant trumpeted at him) much to Zed's amusement.

== Home media ==
This short is a bonus feature on disc 4 of Looney Tunes Golden Collection: Volume 6 but unrestored. A restored print was later released on the Looney Tunes Collector's Choice Volume 3 Blu-Ray disc in 2024.
