= Jeff Rossen =

American television journalist (born 1976)

- Born: November 13, 1976 (age 49); Hauppauge, New York, U.S.
- Education: Syracuse University
- Occupation: Journalist
- Spouse: Danielle Baum
- Children: 3

Jeff Rossen (born November 13, 1976) is an American television journalist. He most recently worked as a consumer reporter for Hearst Television stations from 2019 to 2024. He previously worked at NBC News from 2008 until 2019, where he was a fixture on Today and also contributed to NBC Nightly News with Lester Holt.

== Early life and education ==
Rossen was born in Hauppauge, New York and is a graduate of the S.I. Newhouse School of Public Communications at Syracuse University.

== Career ==
Rossen worked as a reporter at WUTR-TV, the ABC affiliate in Utica, New York. He also worked in Syracuse, New York at ABC affiliate WIXT-TV, and at Fox affiliate WJBK-TV in Detroit before joining WABC-TV in May 2001. While at WJBK he covered the death of Kayla Rolland, a first grader at Buell Elementary School in Flint, Michigan. Rossen's live report was featured in Michael Moore's 2002 documentary Bowling for Columbine.. At WABC, he covered news segments such as the crash of TWA Flight 800 and the September 11 attacks on the World Trade Center in 2001, the New York City Olympic bid in Singapore, Ronald Reagan's death and the London terrorist attack, among others. He hosted a weekly segment on Eyewitness News called "What's Bugging You?"

On August 18, 2008, Rossen added an Instrument Rating to his Private Pilot certificate from the FAA. This fact was revealed when he filed an NBC Nightly News report on February 14, 2009 regarding the crash of Continental Airlines Flight #3407 and was corroborated by the FAA Airmen Certification database according to News 12 New Jersey.

Rossen joined NBC in 2008. In 2012, Rossen was named National Investigative Correspondent where he led an investigative unit titled "Rossen Reports" that appeared on all platforms, including Today, NBC Nightly News and Dateline NBC.

Rossen published a book, Rossen to the Rescue: Secrets to Avoiding Scams, Everyday Dangers, and Major Catastrophes, in fall 2017.

Rossen left NBC in early 2019 after the expiration of his contract.

Rossen joined Hearst Television in 2019 to produce “Rossen Reports” across the company’s television and digital platforms, including NBC, ABC, and CBS television stations in dozens of major cities.

His last Hearst report aired in December 2024. He has since established an independent YouTube channel.

== Personal life ==
Rossen is married to network television executive Danielle Rossen. Rossen is co-executive producer of "America's Most Wanted" on Fox. Previously, Rossen worked on ABC’s primetime hit “What Would You Do?” He served as Senior Producer and Senior Broadcast Producer of ABC’s 20/20. In addition, he developed several unscripted shows for cable networks including Lifetime, A&E, Travel Channel and Freeform.
