= Bugs' Bonnets =

- Title card
- Directed by: Chuck Jones
- Story by: Tedd Pierce
- Starring: Voice characterizations: Mel Blanc; Arthur Q. Bryan (uncredited)
- Narrated by: Opening narration: Robert C. Bruce (uncredited)
- Music by: Milt Franklyn
- Animation by: Ken Harris; Abe Levitow; Ben Washam; Richard Thompson
- Layouts by: Robert Gribbroek
- Backgrounds by: Richard H. Thomas
- Color process: Technicolor
- Production company: Warner Bros. Cartoons
- Distributed by: Warner Bros. Pictures
- Release date: January 14, 1956
- Running time: 6:49
- Language: English

Bugs' Bonnets is a 1956 Warner Bros. Merrie Melodies cartoon, directed by Chuck Jones and written by Tedd Pierce. The short was released on January 14, 1956, and stars Bugs Bunny and Elmer Fudd. The film has both Bugs and Elmer constantly change social roles and personas, accompanying each change of hat on their heads.

== Plot ==
The narrative begins with an exploration of the impact of clothing on human behavior. Illustrated through a businessman's metamorphosis into a pirate persona and Elmer Fudd's transition from mundane attire to hunting garb, the narrative underscores how attire can evoke distinct behavioral responses.

To further illustrate this phenomenon, an event occurs when a truck from the Acme Theatrical Hat Co. accidentally scatters hats across the landscape. This event leads to a series of exchanges as Bugs Bunny and Elmer Fudd don various hats, each triggering a corresponding shift in behavior. Amidst a chase replete with hat exchanges, Bugs adopts roles ranging from a military sergeant to a game warden, while Elmer transforms into General Douglas MacArthur and a pilgrim, among others. Each hat exchange catalyzes a temporary alteration in behavior, leading to confrontations and exchanges between the characters.

Ultimately, the narrative culminates in a whimsical mock wedding ceremony. The scene is set to Felix Mendelssohn's "Wedding March" as Bugs (in a top hat) carries Elmer (in a bride's veil) to a cottage.

== Voice characterizations ==
- Mel Blanc as Bugs Bunny
- Arthur Q. Bryan as Elmer Fudd

== Reaction ==
Film Music Central rated it positively. Animation historian Michael Barrier said of the film in a Funnyworld magazine essay about Chuck Jones: "the preciosity that destroyed some of Jones' earliest cartoons . . . giving them a mincing, self-conscious quality . . . shows up [in] Bugs' Bonnets, a dreary exposition on the notion that the hat one wears shapes one's personality.

== Home media ==
Bugs' Bonnets is available on the four-disc DVD box set Looney Tunes Golden Collection: Volume 5, as well as the similar, two-disc DVD Looney Tunes Spotlight Collection: Volume 5.

Preceded by Roman Legion-Hare	Bugs Bunny Cartoons; 1956	Succeeded by Broom-Stick Bunny
