= Ceiling Hero =

1940 film by Fred Avery

- Title card
- Directed by: Fred Avery
- Story by: Dave Monahan
- Produced by: Leon Schlesinger
- Starring: Mel Blanc
- Narrated by: Robert C. Bruce
- Music by: Carl W. Stalling
- Animation by: Rod Scribner
- Color process: Technicolor
- Production company: Leon Schlesinger Productions
- Distributed by: Warner Bros. Pictures
- Release date: August 24, 1940
- Running time: 8 min
- Country: United States
- Language: English

Ceiling Hero is a 1940 American animated comedy short film directed by Fred Avery. It was released on August 24, 1940. It is part of the Merrie Melodies series.

== Plot ==
The film depicts various unrelated visual gags involving the technological advancement in airplanes.

A pilot has recently received his license, which is humorously "0 · 0 · 6 7/8". He pilots a six-motor airliner, only for the wings and motors to fly off much to the astonishment of both the pilot and passengers. A mechanic repairs an airplane with wheels significantly larger than both the mechanic and the plane itself. A plane-like rocket takes off but explodes in space, leaving behind the words "Eat Tony's Hot Dogs".

A camping trailer-plane hybrid flies its way to a vacationing spot while a plane humorously advertises another eatery. A "cabin cruiser" literally hosts Uncle Tom's Cabin, while the "China clipper" is stylized like a stereotypical Chinese person. Two pilots successfully camouflage their plane to be invisible outside of themselves and the propeller. A plane breaks down while the pilot escapes on time on his parachute, only to find a billboard that reads "Next time take the train", advertising the Southern Atlantic train.

A plane travels to the West Coast from the East Coast. The tallest skyscrapers shrink to avoid crashes. Humorously, the plane follows traffic rules and travels on top of a highway as if its airspace is limited. A thunderstorm occurs so the pilot uses his hand as a windshield. The weather drastically improves once the plane enters California.

Two pilots somehow have their trails intertwine, causing them to be unable to continue on their paths. An experienced pilot obscures his view to "blind fly" and somehow secures a safe landing. A stunt pilot impresses a crowd with vertical loops before he exits the plane and does the same.

A new plane is tested by a test pilot (humorously stated to be from the film of the same name). He flies the plane for as high as possible, somehow passing Los Angeles' city limits and having ice form on the plane alongside a polar bear. After reaching 200 million feet high, he nosedives into the airport but is unable to brake properly. He reports an accident and crashes, but survives the incident which he dismisses nonchalantly when asked about his injury.
