= Little Orphan Airedale =

- Blue Ribbon title card (unrestored)
- Directed by: Charles M. Jones
- Story by: Michael Maltese; Tedd Pierce
- Starring: Mel Blanc
- Music by: Carl Stalling
- Animation by: Lloyd Vaughan; Ben Washam; Ken Harris; Phil Monroe
- Layouts by: Robert Gribbroek
- Backgrounds by: Philip DeGuard
- Color process: Technicolor
- Production company: Warner Bros. Cartoons
- Distributed by: Warner Bros. Pictures; The Vitaphone Corporation
- Release date: October 4, 1947
- Running time: 7 minutes
- Language: English

Little Orphan Airedale is a Warner Bros. Looney Tunes cartoon directed by Charles M. Jones and released on October 4, 1947. Its major significance is its status as the official debut of Jones' version of Robert "Bob" Clampett's character, Charlie "Rover" the Dog. The title is a play on Little Orphan Annie.

== Plot ==
The cartoon's story (which is essentially a re-working of Bob Clampett's 1941 short Porky's Pooch) is about a dog named Rags McMutt, who has just escaped from the dog pound and accidentally meets Charlie, an old friend of his, in a car that he used as a hiding place. Charlie tells Rags about the troubles he had. While looking for prospective masters, Charlie imitated several passersby (including a man with sleepy eyes and big lips as a caricature of Mel Blanc). He finally notices Porky Pig and chooses to follow him. After helping Porky with his groceries, he offers to be Porky's dog, showing him the various tricks, though Porky clearly does not want him. Just as Porky forces Charlie out of his apartment by the belly, Charlie begs not to be roughly handled "the way I am", whispers into his ear and makes a girlish wink in front of the camera. Porky, believing that the dog is female and is pregnant, takes him in, puts him into bed and feeds him with some milk and broth. As Charlie's name gets revealed, Porky realizes that he was fooled again, and angrily throws Charlie out by slamming the bed through the wall. After being begged several more times, Porky seems to finally take Charlie in, before trapping him in a shipping crate to send to Australia. Not long after, Porky finds Charlie in his apartment again, dressed as an Aussie bushman. As Charlie finishes his story, Porky suddenly returns to his car and tosses both dogs out before driving off, with Charlie chasing after him. Rags realizes that Charlie is still begging Porky to keep him, and decides to go back to the pound (even though he has a hard time getting back in).

== Home media ==
This short is available on the Looney Tunes Collector's Choice: Volume 1 Blu-ray.

== See also ==
- Porky Pig filmography
- Looney Tunes and Merrie Melodies filmography (1940–1949)
