= Keep in Style =

- Directed by: Dave Fleischer
- Produced by: Max Fleischer
- Starring: Mae Questel
- Animation by: Edward Nolan; Myron Waldman
- Color process: Black-and-white
- Distributed by: Paramount Pictures
- Release date: November 16, 1934
- Running time: 6 minutes
- Country: United States
- Language: English

Keep in Style is a 1934 Fleischer Studios animated short film starring Betty Boop.

== Plot ==
Betty holds a "Betty Boop Exposition", where she displays the latest modern inventions. Her creations included an ultra-streamlined car, a roadster with multiple rumble seats (for those with a large family), a multi-level baby carriage for quintuplets, and a grand piano that can change into other useful contraptions. Her final invention is her dress, which can change into a flower, a butterfly, and a high-collared gown with a train. The dress is a sensation, and soon everyone is wearing the latest Boop creation.
