= A Pizza Tweety-Pie =

- Directed by: Friz Freleng
- Story by: Warren Foster
- Starring: Mel Blanc; June Foray (uncredited)
- Edited by: Treg Brown
- Music by: Milt Franklyn
- Animation by: Virgil Ross; Gerry Chiniquy; Arthur Davis
- Layouts by: Hawley Pratt
- Backgrounds by: Tom O'Laughlin
- Production company: Warner Bros. Cartoons
- Distributed by: Warner Bros. Pictures
- Release date: February 22, 1958
- Running time: 6 minutes
- Country: United States
- Language: English

A Pizza Tweety-Pie is a 1958 Warner Bros. Looney Tunes animated cartoon directed by Friz Freleng. The short was released on February 22, 1958, and stars Tweety, Sylvester and Granny.

Mel Blanc provides the voices of Sylvester (speaking in an Italian accent) and Tweety, and June Foray (uncredited) provides Granny's voice. It is also the first Warner Bros. cartoon to have Tom O'Loughlin doing the background noises.

== Plot ==
Tweety and Granny arrive at their hotel in Venice, Italy, on vacation. From his cage on the balcony, Tweety looks down at the canal and thinks it is a flooded street and that there must be a lot of barber shops down there (because of the many red and white striped barber poles).

As Tweety is singing "Santa Lucia" and strumming his mandolin in his cage, Sylvester spies him from his balcony across the canal. In haste, he runs out of the hotel with an open sandwich roll, and falls into the water. He climbs out and finds a canoe and starts rowing, but forgets to loosen it from the rope. After he cuts the rope, he sinks with the canoe.

Sylvester then starts rowing in an inflatable boat, but Tweety takes a slingshot and punctures it. As the air leaks out, the raft floats back to the dock with Sylvester in it and the raft gets stuck on him. Sylvester removes the deflated raft from his hind quarters in disgust.

Next, Sylvester tries to swing across the canal with a rope Tarzan-style, but lands in the water and straight into the gaping mouth of a hungry shark who resembles Dopey Dick from Rabbitson Crusoe. Sylvester wrestles his way out and swims hurriedly away.

Then, using an electric fan and a balloon tied to his waist, Sylvester attempts to float his way across through the air, but he floats too high. Tweety, again using the slingshot, shoots Sylvester down from the sky. Sylvester dons a bathing cap as he is descending, but misses the water, landing on the sidewalk, next to Tweety and Granny's hotel as it turns out. He runs into the hotel and takes the elevator up to the floor of Granny and Tweety's room, but Granny and Tweety are leaving, so Sylvester goes back down the elevator, which takes him into the water.

As Tweety and Granny are taking a relaxing gondola ride along the canal, Sylvester is awaiting them on a bridge with a fishing rod. Sylvester hooks a passing speedboat, forcibly yanking him into the water. After a close call with a striped pole, Sylvester gets slammed into a low bridge, where there is a warning sign that reads, "Ducka You Head, Lowla Bridgeada."

Finally, as Sylvester is dining on a plate of spaghetti, he again hears Tweety singing "Santa Lucia" (he is out of his cage this time), and proceeds to hurl a strand of spaghetti like a lasso to catch Tweety. Nearly strangled, Tweety screams to Granny for help. Granny clutches Sylvester's noose of pasta and substitutes a mallet in Tweety's place. As Sylvester sucks the spaghetti into his mouth, he gets clobbered squarely in the head with the mallet, causing birds to appear uttering Tweety's trademark line: "I tawt I taw a puddy tat!" (Ironically in this cartoon, Tweety never uses this line himself.)

== Home media ==
This short is available on disc 1 of the Looney Tunes Collector's Vault: Volume 3 Blu-ray set.
