= Buccaneer Bunny =

1948 animated short film directed by Friz Freleng

- Directed by: I. Freleng
- Story by: Michael Maltese; Tedd Pierce
- Starring: Mel Blanc
- Music by: Carl Stalling
- Animation by: Manuel Perez; Ken Champin; Virgil Ross; Gerry Chiniquy
- Layouts by: Hawley Pratt
- Backgrounds by: Paul Julian
- Color process: Technicolor
- Production company: Warner Bros. Cartoons
- Distributed by: Warner Bros. Pictures; The Vitaphone Corporation
- Release date: May 8, 1948
- Running time: 7:25
- Language: English

Buccaneer Bunny is a 1948 Looney Tunes cartoon directed by Friz Freleng. The short was released on May 8, 1948, and features Bugs Bunny and Yosemite Sam.

== Plot ==
The cartoon opens with titles featuring an instrumental of "The Sailor's Hornpipe" (also one of the theme songs to the Popeye cartoon series), seguéing to a scene on a beach where we see Sam as a pirate, digging a hole in which to bury his treasure. He is singing the stereotypical pirate shanty Dead Man's Chest—on the second strain, Sam switches from the typical "yo-ho-ho and a bottle of rum!" to a decidedly more original "yo-ho-ho and a bottle of Ma's old fashioned ci-der", with a conga kick on the last syllable and a parody of "Dad's Old-Fashioned Root Beer" (a well-known radio advertising jingle at that time).

In the attempt to bury his treasure, Sam has unknowingly encroached on Bugs Bunny's domain, as Bugs happens to have his rabbit hole there. When Bugs asks him who he is, he responds in his typical way: "What's up, doc?! I ain't no doc! I'm a pirate! Sea-Goin' Sam, the blood-thirstiest, shoot-'em-first-iest, doggone worst-iest buccaneer has ever sailed the Spanish Main!"

To protect the location of his treasure, Sam prepares to shoot Bugs, claiming "Dead rabbits tell no tales!" Bugs then temporarily tricks Sam into preparing to shoot himself in the head by saying: "Now, just a minute, Red. Ain't you got that wrong? You mean dead men tell no tales." After realizing he's been tricked, Sam grinds his teeth together so hard they shatter. He then fires at Bugs.

Bugs jumps into a lifeboat that is tied to the dock. He ends up rowing to Sam's ship without a boat. As for Sam, he sees the paddles are gone and swims towards the ship to retrieve the paddles. He carries them in his teeth as he swims back to the tied lifeboat - oblivious that he doesn't need them since he already made it to the ship without them. He rows in the boat back to his ship.

As Sam searches for Bugs on the ship, the rabbit appears disguised as Captain Bligh, affecting the voice and thick-lipped appearance of Charles Laughton in his portrayal of Bligh in the 1935 film Mutiny On The Bounty. Sam takes criticism from "Captain Bligh", who then orders him to do a bunch of chores on deck, then turns to the audience and calls Sam a "maroon" (one of Bugs' frequently-invoked insults, a play on the words "moron" and "marooned"). Sam soon realizes he's been tricked again, and chases a fleeing Bugs, but crashes into the mast while doing so.

In a side gag, Bugs tries to hide, but a pesky parrot keeps giving the rabbit away by squawking to Sam: "He's in there! He's in there! Awk!" Eventually, Bugs gets fed up with the parrot and asks him: "Polly want a cracker?" The parrot changes his tune: "Polly want a cracker! Polly want a cracker! Awk!" Bugs hands him a lit firecracker, which promptly explodes, blasting all of the bird's feathers off, leaving him dazed, smoldering and complaining before he passes out: "Me and my big mouth!" For the next part, Bugs poses as the now-unconscious parrot in order to get Sam into a cannon. Bugs then lights the fuse, the cannon explodes and Sam falls out of the barrel.

Bugs then gets into the crow's nest, which works like an elevator, but when Sam tries to use it, the crow's nest squishes him. After popping back to normal, Sam orders Bugs to come down. Bugs mockingly tells him that the elevator is out of order and tosses him a rope. But when Sam climbs up the rope, the rope is now hanging on a pully, making Sam climb back down and hit the deck. For his next attempt, he tries to use a cannonball on a plank as a makeshift catapult, but it throws him up into the bottom of the crow's nest. In another gag that skirts the laws of physics, Bugs tells Sam he's going to jump, though he instead drops a convenient anvil over the side of the crow's nest—Sam catches it, and the anvil's momentum causes the entire ship (except for the crow's nest) to submerge. Sam mouths some apparent curses underwater, then tosses the anvil overboard and the ship resurfaces.

When Bugs comes down to check on Sam, the latter proceeds to attack him with his sword, making Bugs mad that he's "sore again". Bugs crawls in a hatch in the ship's side, with Sam following with his sword: "Ooooh, I'll keelhaul you for this!". When he opens the board, he is blasted by a cannon. Bugs opens the hatch to Sam's left and calls: "Yoo-hoo! Mr. Pirate!". Sam opens that board and, again, gets blasted by a cannon. Bugs opens another hatch and calls: "Oh, uh, Redbeard!". Sam, trying to avoid getting blasted again, decides to open up the hatch with his sword from a safe distance. Suddenly, just as he opens that hatch, another hatch opens in his face and a cannon blasts him once more.

Sam chases Bugs again, and is subjected to the lots-of-doors in-and-out routine (previously used in Little Red Riding Rabbit), which ends with Sam getting blasted by a cannon yet again. After that, Sam confronts Bugs, who throws a lighted match into the gunpowder room below deck, which a panicking Sam swiftly retrieves (a gag that would later be recycled into 1954's Captain Hareblower). After this is repeated, Sam threatens to not go after the match if Bugs does it a third time. Bugs does it, and Sam tries to distract himself, first with a yo-yo, then with jacks (all while Bugs idly files his nails), until he finally gives in and goes to run after the burning match, but the gunpowder (apparently dry despite the ship having been submerged a few minutes earlier) explodes before he can make a step, and pieces of the ship land on the beach, including the part of the deck with Bugs and Sam, with Bugs commenting that Sam "didn't make it". On his last nerve, Sam furiously chases Bugs with his gun ("Ooooh, I'll blast your head off for this!"), and Bugs flees back into his original rabbit hole. Sam gloats to Bugs and sticks his head into the rabbit hole ("Alright, now! I got ya cornered! Come out and meet your doom!"), a cannon blasts him once more, from the rabbit hole.

Finally, Sam raises the white flag in defeat; whereas Bugs turns to the audience, puts on an old-style ship captain's hat, and paraphrases John Paul Jones by saying: "I had not even begun to fight!", before laughing.

== Additional Crew ==
- Film Edited by Treg Brown
- Uncredited Orchestration by Milt Franklyn

== Reception ==
Animation historian David Gerstein writes, "In Buccaneer Bunny, Sam out-Sams himself by turning a sea shanty into a rhumba and by gritting his teeth so hard that they break. The trappings of piracy become part of the show, with booming cannons, ascending crow's nests, and stoolie parrots, all of which deliver an in-your-face impact that few other Sam stories could offer."

== Home media ==
- VHS - Cartoon Moviestars: Starring Bugs Bunny!
- Laserdisc - Cartoon Moviestars: Bugs Bunny Classics: Special Collector's Edition
- VHS - Bugs Bunny Collection: Bugs Bunny's Zaniest Toons
- Laserdisc - The Golden Age of Looney Tunes, Vol. 4, Side 1: Bugs Bunny
- DVD - Looney Tunes Golden Collection: Volume 5, Disc 1
- DVD - Looney Tunes Spotlight Collection: Volume 5, Disc 1
- DVD, Blu-ray - Looney Tunes Platinum Collection: Volume 1, Disc 1

== See also ==
- Looney Tunes and Merrie Melodies filmography (1940–1949)
- Bugs Bunny filmography
- Yosemite Sam filmography

Preceded by Rabbit Punch	Bugs Bunny Cartoons; 1948	Succeeded by Bugs Bunny Rides Again
