= The Road Runner Show =

- Genre: Anthology
- Theme music composer: Barbara Cameron
- Opening theme: "The Road Runner Song"
- Country of origin: United States
- Original language: English
- No. of seasons: 3
- No. of episodes: 26

Production
- Running time: 30 minutes
- Production companies: Warner Bros. Television; DePatie–Freleng Enterprises

Original release
- Network: CBS (1966–1968); ABC (1971–1973)
- Release: September 10, 1966 – September 2, 1972

The Road Runner Show is an American Saturday morning animated anthology series which compiled theatrical Wile E. Coyote and the Road Runner cartoons from the Looney Tunes and Merrie Melodies, which were produced by Warner Bros. Cartoons between 1949 and 1964. Several of the shorts, especially the ones produced from 1965 to 1966, were produced by DePatie–Freleng Enterprises after Warner Bros. closed their animation studio. DePatie–Freleng Enterprises provided the animation for the show's intro, closing credits as well as the wrap-around bumpers.

== Background ==
From 1966 to 1968, The Road Runner Show initially ran for two seasons on CBS. From 1968 to 1969, CBS combined The Road Runner Show with The Bugs Bunny Show to produce The Bugs Bunny/Road Runner Hour. The Road Runner and the Coyote more often shared at least an hour with Bugs Bunny on CBS. In 1971, ABC picked up The Road Runner Show and ran for two seasons until 1973, when the network dropped the show due to its excessively aggressive scenes. Later on, CBS re-acquired the show and aired them as reruns under The Bugs Bunny/Road Runner Show until the mid-1980s.

Each show would feature one Road Runner/Coyote cartoon, with a Tweety and Sylvester cartoon in the middle segment, and other WB animated character(s) in the third segment (usually Elmer Fudd, Foghorn Leghorn, Speedy Gonzales, Pepé Le Pew and Hippety Hopper). The intro of every cartoon was replaced with a simple title card, along with the shortened version of William Lava's arrangement of "The Merry-Go-Round Broke Down".

== Internationally ==
The show aired in Albania on Bang Bang and Çufo, and in Hungary on M1 and RTL Klub. In Indonesia, The Road Runner Show was first aired on RCTI shortly after its launch in 1989 until 1990, and on TV7 (later rebranded as Trans7) between 2006 and 2008. In the Philippines, it was aired on RPN 9 from 1988 to 1990.

== Theme song ==
The theme song was written and performed by Barbara Cameron. In 1999, it was covered by the Mexican band Chicos de Barrio and was later parodied in Histeria! featuring Father Time and Big Fat Baby. It has also been covered by Barenaked Ladies, and Barbara Cameron re-recorded the theme with her son, jazz violinist Doug Cameron (with Paul Julian's iconic Beep-Beep and other sound effects from the shorts used on the recording) for his Different Hats album in 2008. An instrumental version was used as the theme song for the Road Runner and Wile E. Coyote segments of The Looney Tunes Show.

== Episodes (Season 3) ==
Nº	Wile E. and Road Runner	Tweety and Sylvester	Other	Air date
1	Zip 'N Snort	The Jet Cage	The Wild Chase	September 4, 1971
2	Beep Prepared	Putty Tat Trouble	Cats and Bruises	September 11, 1971
3	Ready, Set, Zoom!	Hyde and Go Tweet	Weasel While You Work	September 18, 1971
4	Zoom at the Top	Tree Cornered Tweety	Hoppy Daze	September 25, 1971
5	War and Pieces	Tweety's Circus	A Sheep in the Deep	October 2, 1971
6	To Beep or Not to Beep	Trick or Tweet	Birds of a Father	October 9, 1971
7	The Solid Tin Coyote	A Street Cat Named Sylvester	The Dixie Fryer	October 16, 1971
8	There They Go-Go-Go!	Dog Pounded	Woolen Under Where	October 23, 1971
9	Scrambled Aches	Hawaiian Aye Aye	Dr. Jerkyl's Hide	October 30, 1971
10	Sugar and Spies	A Bird in a Guilty Cage	Cannery Woe	November 6, 1971
11	Whoa, Be-Gone!	Tweet Tweet Tweety	Don't Axe Me	November 13, 1971
12	Clippety Clobbered	Greedy for Tweety	Pop 'im Pop!	November 20, 1971
13	Hopalong Casualty	Tweet and Lovely	Wild Over You	November 27, 1971
14	Hairied and Hurried	Tugboat Granny	Mother Was a Rooster	December 4, 1971
15	Lickety-Splat	Tweet and Sour	Fish and Slips	December 11, 1971
16	Tired and Feathered	Fowl Weather	A Mutt in a Rut	December 18, 1971
17	Going! Going! Gosh!	Gift Wrapped	Mouse-Taken Identity	December 25, 1971
18	Rushing Roulette	Ain't She Tweet	The Mouse on 57th Street	January 1, 1972
19	Stop! Look! And Hasten!	Catty Cornered	Chili Weather	January 8, 1972
20	Highway Runnery	A Pizza Tweety-Pie	Strangled Eggs	January 15, 1972
21	Gee Whiz-z-z-z-z-z-z	Trip for Tat	What's My Lion?	January 22, 1972
22	Shot and Bothered	Muzzle Tough	Touché and Go	January 29, 1972
23	Fast and Furry-ous	A Bird in a Bonnet	Claws in the Lease	February 5, 1972
24	Out and Out Rout	Tweet Dreams	The Slick Chick	February 12, 1972
25	Run, Run, Sweet Road Runner	Snow Business	To Itch His Own	February 19, 1972
26	Boulder Wham!	Tweet Zoo	The Slap-Hoppy Mouse	February 26, 1972

== Cast ==
- Paul Julian as The Road Runner
- Mel Blanc as Sylvester, Tweety
- June Foray as Granny (in "The Jet Cage" segment)
- Additional voices provided by Bea Benaderet and Hal Smith

== Trivia ==
- About 27 Road Runner cartoons and 26 Tweety and Sylvester cartoons are included in this show, with the first episode being the only episode to contain two Road Runner cartoons sandwiching one Tweety and Sylvester cartoon.
- Among the third segments of each episode, the show contained three Elmer Fudd cartoons (only one featuring Daffy Duck), two Pepé Le Pew cartoons, four Speedy Gonzales cartoons (all co-starring Sylvester, one shared with the Road Runner), two Ralph Wolf and Sam Sheepdog cartoons, four Foghorn Leghorn cartoons, and two one-shot cartoons directed by Chuck Jones. Of all 26 episodes, Sylvester appeared in eleven of these third segments, and among the minor characters in the Sylvester cartoons, Spike and Chester co-star in only one, while Hippety Hopper co-stars in four (three featuring Sylvester Junior), while Sylvester Jr. co-stars in six (three featuring Hippety Hopper).
- Despite the third segments' title card depicting Yosemite Sam, no Yosemite Sam cartoons are aired in this show. No Bugs Bunny or Porky Pig cartoons are included in any episode of this show either because they each had a show of their own.
- Of all the 27 Road Runner cartoons aired in this show, Chuck Jones has the most with fifteen, followed by Rudy Larriva with nine, Robert McKimson with two and Friz Freleng with one.
- Almost all the Sylvester cartoons aired in the third segments in this show are directed by Robert McKimson, except for "Chili Weather", "Dr. Jerkyl's Hide", "Cats and Bruises" and "The Wild Chase", which are directed by Friz Freleng. In addition, all three Elmer Fudd cartoons in this show are directed by Robert McKimson.
- Despite both the opening and closing sequences of this show including clips from "Chaser on the Rocks", "Hip Hip-Hurry!" and "Wild About Hurry", none of these are included in any episode.

== See also ==
- The Bugs Bunny Show
- Adventures of the Road Runner
