= Ain't She Tweet =

1952 film directed by Friz Freleng

- Title card
- Directed by: I. Freleng
- Story by: Warren Foster
- Starring: Mel Blanc, Bea Benaderet
- Music by: Carl Stalling
- Animation by: Ken Champin; Manuel Perez; Arthur Davis /Virgil Ross
- Layouts by: Hawley Pratt
- Backgrounds by: Irv Wyner
- Color process: Technicolor
- Production company: Warner Bros. Cartoons
- Distributed by: Warner Bros. Pictures
- Release date: June 21, 1952
- Running time: 7:09
- Language: English

Ain't She Tweet is a 1952 Warner Bros. Looney Tunes cartoon directed by Friz Freleng. The short was released on June 21, 1952, and stars Tweety and Sylvester.

The title is a play on the song "Ain't She Sweet."

== Plot ==
Sylvester stands outside a pet store window, watching Tweety singing "Fiddle-De-Di" in the display area. Upon seeing the cat, the bird goes over to a mouse, and they laugh at Sylvester, who then throws a brick at the window in response. However, upon seeing a cop walk up behind him, the would-be feline vandal runs in front of the brick and absorbs the blow.

As Sylvester is planning to cut through the window with a glass cutter, a deliveryman takes Tweety away to be delivered to Granny's house. The cat follows the deliveryman and rushes into the yard, stumbling upon a whole army of bulldogs.

The rest of the cartoon contains Sylvester's attempts (all unsuccessful) to get at Tweety:

- Sylvester uses a stick with an imitation cat, but the bulldogs clobber it. Then he paces to think up another plan.
- After which, he walks across a tree branch that extends from the outside to the house, but Tweety saws the branch off. After unsuccessfully begging Tweety to stop, Sylvester frightfully waves goodbye to the audience and falls straight into the dogs from the tree. Tweety starts laughing ("That puddy tat's got a pink skin under his fur coat!"), whereas Sylvester closes the gate, bruised, battered, and losing most of his fur from the attack.
- Sylvester uses stilts to walk harmlessly above the dogs, but Tweety gives the canines some tools to cut the stilts down to size. Soon, Sylvester tries a hasty retreat but ends up just short of the gate.
- Sylvester builds a rocket, setting his fur on fire upon launch.
- After that, the cat rides a bucket attached to a wire that he connected from a telephone pole to the edge of Granny's house. Unfortunately, his weight is too heavy for the bucket's support, and the added weight lowers it down to the horde of dogs, who quickly beat Sylvester up.
- Sylvester waits until the yard empties out and then walks unannounced to the house. But the dogs are already waiting inside, so they run and tackle the cat. This time, Sylvester gets away, but before he can catch his breath, a kindly old man – thinking the "poor pussycat" has simply wandered outside his home – throws him back into the yard (seemingly oblivious to the "Beware of Dogs" sign), where the dogs beat Sylvester up some more.
- In another attempt, Sylvester hides in a package with dog food intended for Granny. She comes outside to take the package, but she doesn't manage to unwrap it – just as Sylvester has expected – due to the dogs constantly jumping and barking excitedly, so she throws it to them. As she watches them tear open the package to get their "food", Granny comments on their hunger.

Finally, Sylvester decides to wait until the early morning to tip-toe silently through the yard. But the alarm clock goes off at 4 a.m., awakening the dogs who assault the cat one last time, while Tweety watches with delight.

Preceded by Gift Wrapped	Tweety and Sylvester cartoons 1952	Succeeded by A Bird in a Guilty Cage
