= A Street Cat Named Sylvester =

1953 film by Friz Freleng

- Directed by: I. Freleng
- Story by: Warren Foster
- Starring: Mel Blanc; Bea Benaderet (uncredited)
- Music by: Carl Stalling
- Animation by: Virgil Ross; Arthur Davis; Manuel Perez; Ken Champin
- Layouts by: Hawley Pratt
- Backgrounds by: Irv Wyner
- Color process: Technicolor
- Production company: Warner Bros. Cartoons
- Distributed by: Warner Bros. Pictures; The Vitaphone Corporation
- Release date: September 5, 1953 (US)
- Running time: 6 minutes
- Language: English

A Street Cat Named Sylvester is a Warner Bros. Looney Tunes animated short directed by Friz Freleng, released on September 5, 1953, and stars Tweety and Sylvester. The title is a pun on A Streetcar Named Desire, a play later made into a film.

== Plot ==
Tweety stumbles into Sylvester's house looking for shelter and Sylvester hesitates, wondering if he saw a tweety bird in the same manner Tweety wonders if he saw a 'Putty Tat'. Sylvester snatches him inside, but he has to hide Tweety in a vase covered by books when Granny appears. While Hector the Bulldog remains bedridden, having injured himself while chasing Sylvester, the cat causes whatever diversion he can to stop Granny from spotting Tweety, making Granny give multiple doses of medicine to him.

Despite the injury, Hector keeps getting in Sylvester's way from eating Tweety, saying he'll have to get him over his dead body. Sylvester tries to arrange that by dropping a refrigerator on top of Hector, but he miscalculates his aim and the fridge falls on him instead. Now, with Sylvester having injured himself from the refrigerator accident and being bedridden with Hector, Tweety spikes Hector's medicine resulting in Sylvester ingesting the disgusting stuff, leaving him in "an awful predicament when that medicine kicks in".

== Home media ==
This short is available on disc 1 of the Looney Tunes Collector's Vault: Volume 2 Blu-ray set.

Preceded by Tom Tom Tomcat	Tweety and Sylvester cartoons 1953	Succeeded by Catty Cornered
