= Trip for Tat =

Trip For Tat
- Directed by: Friz Freleng
- Story by: Michael Maltese
- Starring: Mel Blanc (all other voices); June Foray (Granny)
- Edited by: Treg Brown
- Music by: Milt Franklyn
- Animation by: Gerry Chiniquy; Tom Ray; Virgil Ross
- Layouts by: Hawley Pratt
- Backgrounds by: Tom O'Loughlin
- Color process: Technicolor
- Production company: Warner Bros. Cartoons
- Distributed by: Warner Bros. Pictures; The Vitaphone Corporation
- Release date: October 29, 1960 (US premiere)
- Running time: 7 min (one reel)
- Language: English

Trip For Tat is a 1960 Warner Bros. Merrie Melodies animated short cartoon film directed by Friz Freleng. The short was released on October 29, 1960, and stars Tweety and Sylvester. This is the only cartoon where both Tweety and Sylvester win in the end, even though the latter fails to catch Tweety.

== Summary ==
Although it contains a new plot, wherein Granny and Tweety travel to various locations (Paris, Swiss Alps, Japan, and Italy) while Sylvester tries to catch Tweety in every one, the cartoon is mostly made up of footage from previous cartoons. Here are the cartoons that the short borrows animation from, in order of appearance:

- Tweety's S.O.S. (1951): The entire boat sequence where Tweety tricked Sylvester into getting seasick and the piece of pork, further inducing the malady.
- Tree Cornered Tweety (1956): The following two:
  - In the Alps, the sequence is where Sylvester tries to catch Tweety (wearing spoons for snowshoes) on skis but then crashes into a tree.
  - In Japan, the sequence where Sylvester is chasing Tweety right to the bridge scene, but when he saws open a hole, he and the cut floorboard fall from a great height and into a fisherman's boat in the river (with the American fisherman changed to a stereotypically Japanese fisherman).
- Tweet Tweet Tweety (1951): The sequence where Sylvester swings towards Tweety on a balcony while barely avoiding a construction pillar several times until he eventually gets flattened.
- A Pizza Tweety-Pie (1958): The final sequence where Sylvester eats spaghetti in the restaurant after he vows to keep birds off his dietary list.
