= Fowl Weather =

- Directed by: I. Freleng
- Story by: Warren Foster
- Starring: Mel Blanc; Bea Benaderet (uncredited)
- Music by: Carl Stalling
- Animation by: Arthur Davis; Manuel Perez; Ken Champin; Virgil Ross
- Layouts by: Hawley Pratt
- Backgrounds by: Irv Wyner
- Color process: Technicolor
- Production company: Warner Bros. Cartoons
- Distributed by: Warner Bros. Pictures; The Vitaphone Corporation
- Release date: April 4, 1953
- Running time: 6 minutes
- Language: English

Fowl Weather is a 1953 Warner Bros. Merrie Melodies animated short directed by Friz Freleng. The short was released on April 4, 1953, and stars Tweety and Sylvester. The title is a pun on "fowl" (chickens, ducks, and turkeys), and the phrase "foul weather".

== Plot ==
Granny leaves Hector the Bulldog in charge of looking after Tweety while she is away. If he fails to protect Tweety, she will shoot Hector. Sylvester tries to eat Tweety, first by disguising himself as a scarecrow (complete with ragged clothes and tall stilts), then Hector starts barking and an annoyed Sylvester hits him with his wooden leg and yells his only spoken line in the cartoon, "Aaaaah, Shaddap!" Furious, Hector gets back up and bites the wooden leg and chases Sylvester away.

Now out of his cage, Tweety decides to look around. He decides to greet the farm animals. "Hello, moo-moo cow!", even unintentionally insulting the pig with "Hi there, dirty piggy!" After detecting a goat to really be Sylvester in a realistic rubber mask ("Hello, puddy tat!"), Tweety takes cover in a chicken coop.

Sylvester tries several times to get into the coop using a toy soldier, dressing himself poorly as a hen, etc., only to be stopped by the rooster, who beats him soundly. While mimicking one of the baby chicks, Tweety comes across a worm and tells the "piece of spaghetti with eyes" to hide from the other chickens. A last attempt involves Sylvester, still in hen "costume", and the rooster, waiting while Sylvester "lays eggs". The rooster decides to use a grenade to make him "hatch" one. At this point, Hector realizes Tweety's absence, and demands to know his whereabouts. Short on time, and fearing Granny will kill him, he paints Sylvester yellow, stuffs the cat in Tweety's birdcage and has him act like Tweety.

Granny returns, and the ruse works. Tweety meanwhile also returns and notices the change of circumstances. "Ho ho! If he's a birdie, den dat makes me a putty tat!" Tweety claims and starts acting like a cat, much to Hector's shock.

== Home media ==
This short is available on disc 1 of the Looney Tunes Collector's Vault: Volume 2 Blu-ray set.

== See also ==
- List of cartoons featuring Sylvester
