= Hawaiian Aye Aye =

- Directed by: Gerry Chiniquy
- Story by: Tedd Pierce; Bill Danch
- Starring: Mel Blanc; June Foray
- Edited by: Treg Brown
- Music by: Bill Lava
- Animation by: Virgil Ross; Bob Matz; Art Leonardi; Lee Halpern
- Layouts by: Robert Gribbroek
- Backgrounds by: Tom O'Loughlin
- Production company: Warner Bros. Cartoons
- Distributed by: Warner Bros. Pictures
- Release date: June 27, 1964
- Running time: 7 minutes
- Language: English

Hawaiian Aye Aye is a 1964 Warner Bros. Merrie Melodies animated short, directed by Gerry Chiniquy and written by Tedd Pierce and Bill Danch. The short was released on June 27, 1964, and stars Tweety and Sylvester.

Sylvester and Tweety's voices are provided by Mel Blanc, while Tweety's owner Granny was voiced by June Foray. That was the final theatrical cartoon to feature the duo of Sylvester and Tweety together, and the last appearance of Tweety in a theatrical cartoon until Carrotblanca in 1995. It was also the last Merrie Melodies cartoon produced by the original Warner Bros. Cartoons studio before it closed down in 1963, as well as the last Merrie Melodies short to have the target titles and the last to use "Merrily We Roll Along" at the beginning and end of the short. The title was inspired by a TV series produced by Warner Bros. Television called Hawaiian Eye.

== Plot ==
In the state of Hawaii, on one of the islets, Granny is off to join a luau, wearing a muumuu, leaving Tweety to look after himself. A peckish Sylvester spots Tweety and tries to get him, but only one thing stands between Sylvester and his prey: Granny's pet shark, Sharkey. Sylvester's attempts with an inflatable raft, a zip-line, an air pumping diving suit and a pair of stilts, all fail. Just then, Granny and Tweety leave on a cruise boat bound for the continental U.S. as they finished from their vacation. Determined not to lose Tweety, Sylvester rows in a canoe after the cruiser with Sharkey behind him all this time.

== See also ==
- List of American films of 1964
