= Sylvester and Tweety in Cagey Capers =

1994 video game

- North American cover art
- Developer: Alexandria
- Publisher: Time Warner Interactive
- Producer: TecMagik
- Designers: Gary Goldberg; K.J. Holm; Paul O'Connor
- Composer: Nathan Grigg
- Platform: Genesis/Mega Drive
- Release: NA: September 1994; EU: November 1994
- Genre: Platform
- Mode: Single-player

Sylvester and Tweety in Cagey Capers is a 2D platform game featuring the Looney Tunes characters Sylvester and Tweety. It was released for the Genesis/Mega Drive console in 1994 and was the first video game to star Sylvester and Tweety.

== Gameplay ==
Sylvester has finally caught Tweety, thus ending the first level.

Players play as Sylvester the Cat (voiced by Joe Alaskey) and chase after Tweety (voiced by Bob Bergen) in each of the levels. Tweety usually stands in one spot, moving only to the next spot when Sylvester draws near, eventually reaching the last possible spot where he is caught. Sylvester has a "Tweety scope" which moves the camera to Tweety's current location, and Sylvester Jr. will occasionally appear, pointing towards Tweety's location. Enemies such as Granny, Hector the Bulldog, and Hippety Hopper will chase after Sylvester, attacking him when near. Sylvester can pick up things such as boxing gloves and bones to defend himself against certain enemies, though they can only be temporarily disabled, not defeated. He can also stack boxes and use pogo sticks to reach platforms that are too high to jump on, as well as an umbrella with which he can use to fall slowly, thus preventing fall damage.

Sylvester can also hide from his enemies behind lamps or in barrels. How far the player can get in the game depends on the difficulty setting. If the player puts the difficulty at 11%, they can only do one level. The game needs to be set at 81% difficulty or higher to play all the levels. The player can also gain points by knocking things off the shelves or from bags of catnip, as well as striking at Tweety as he escapes. Sylvester can gain a life for 100,000 points. If Sylvester lose his last life, he has two continues to resume the game. The player also has a set time limit to finish the current level which can be increased by collecting clocks.

== Development ==
Producer TecMagik was originally going to publish the game themselves, but just before its announced release date of June 1994, they sold the game to Time Warner Interactive. Time Warner Interactive then made several adjustments to the game, chiefly to make it easier.

== Reception ==
Italian magazine Computer+Videogiochi gave the game 77. Spanish magazine Superjuegos gave the game 83.

CPTV, the parent company of developer Alexandria, reported that the game sold more than 60,000 units in September 1994. This made it the second best-selling product in publisher Time Warner Interactive's history. By October 1995, the game had sold more than 104,000 units.

== See also ==
- List of Looney Tunes video games
