= Greedy for Tweety =

- Title card
- Directed by: Friz Freleng
- Story by: Warren Foster
- Starring: Mel Blanc
- Edited by: Treg Brown
- Music by: Milt Franklyn
- Animation by: Gerry Chiniquy; Art Davis; Virgil Ross
- Layouts by: Hawley Pratt
- Backgrounds by: Boris Gorelick
- Color process: Technicolor
- Production company: Warner Bros. Cartoons
- Distributed by: Warner Bros. Pictures
- Release date: September 28, 1957
- Running time: 6 minutes
- Language: English

Greedy for Tweety is a 1957 Warner Bros. Looney Tunes cartoon directed by Friz Freleng. The short was released on September 28, 1957, and stars Tweety and Sylvester.

The story was also reworked into the 1971 The Ant and the Aardvark cartoon From Bed to Worse.

== Plot ==
Hector, Sylvester and Tweety are chasing each other in the street, but they get injured offscreen by passing cars. They are taken to the hospital, where Nurse Granny tends to them. Only the innocent Tweety tries to get rest, while Sylvester tries to get him and Hector tries to harass Sylvester. Sylvester tries many methods to cause pain to the dog's bandaged leg, but always fails, with the dog trying to do the same to him.

Sylvester succeeds in devouring Tweety at one point, but panicking Granny takes him to the X-ray room to look at his skeleton to take him to "puddy surgery" and Sylvester comes out from there with a large bandage over his stomach, while Tweety, none the worst for wear and back in his own hospital bed in his cage, angrily tells off Sylvester with calling him a "bad ol' puddy tat!". Sylvester then tells a chuckling Hector furiously "OK, buster, you ASKED for it!" but is then chased by Hector, who tries to whack him. Sylvester puts his bandaged leg in a mouse-hole while he teases Hector. The mouse hits Sylvester's bandaged leg, then Hector's, causing both of them to hop and scream in pain. Granny sees this and, thinking they were at each other again, then straps them both in bed until they can behave.

Granny tells Hector to stop sulking and "get a hobby" like Sylvester, who is building something over his strap. When Granny leaves, Sylvester uses his newly built device to put a stick of dynamite in Hector's cast. Hector, horrified, quickly grabs a crutch and rows himself with the bed and switches casts with Sylvester. Hector's cast explodes on Sylvester's leg, causing him to shriek in pain, at which point Granny comes in and informs the trio that there was nothing wrong with them and they are therefore being dismissed.

In the end the three end up starting their chase in the street again. Granny, who had just put "Tweety", "Cat" and "Dog" labels into outgoing patients' list, sees the chase and puts the labels back to incoming patients' list, anticipating their return. She then closes the cartoon sighing: "Que sera, sera" ("What will be, will be").

== Home media ==
This short is available on the Looney Tunes Collector's Choice: Volume 1 Blu-ray.
