= Snow Business =

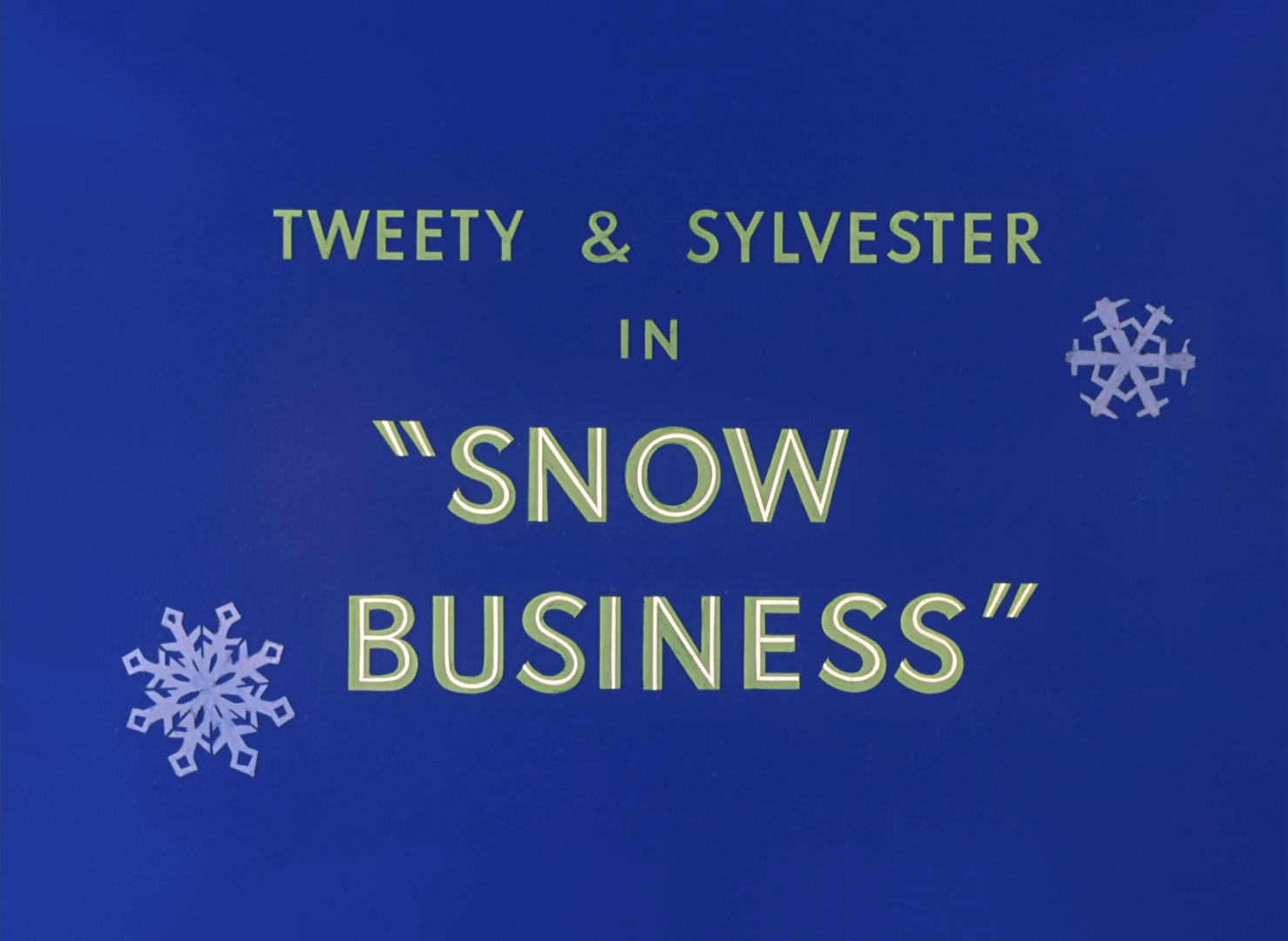
- Title card
- Directed by: I. Freleng
- Story by: Warren Foster
- Starring: Mel Blanc
- Music by: Carl Stalling
- Animation by: Virgil Ross; Arthur Davis; Manuel Perez; Ken Champin
- Layouts by: Hawley Pratt
- Backgrounds by: Carlos Manríquez
- Production company: Warner Bros. Cartoons
- Distributed by: Warner Bros. Pictures; The Vitaphone Corporation
- Release date: January 17, 1953
- Running time: 7:06
- Language: English

Snow Business is a 1953 Warner Bros. Looney Tunes cartoon directed by Friz Freleng. The short was released on January 17, 1953, and stars Tweety and Sylvester.

== Plot ==
A security guard refuses to let Granny drive her car back into the mountain cabin because the roads are blocked due to a bad heavy snowstorm, but Granny pleads to be let through because her bird and cat are trapped inside the cabin and would fatally starve.

Meanwhile, Sylvester and Tweety are alone in Granny's mountain cabin. The radio reports that the roads will be blocked for six weeks. Hearing this and knowing that he'll starve, Sylvester nervously checks the cabin for food, finding nothing but bird seed. While Sylvester and Tweety are initially friends in the short, Sylvester attempts to eat Tweety, tricking him into thinking various cooking methods are games, to which Tweety is oblivious. The Sylvester-chases-Tweety cycle is continually disrupted by a mouse who is even hungrier and more desperate than Sylvester, the mouse seizing upon the idea of eating Sylvester.

Sylvester suggests that Tweety play sailboat, but in a pot where he is attempting to cook him. This is interrupted by the mouse discovering Sylvester and gnawing his tail. After fighting the mouse and chasing him back to his hole, Sylvester boards it up. While checking the pot, the mouse pushes Sylvester into it and covers it. Sylvester escapes and replugs the mouse hole. Sylvester convinces Tweety to skate on an oily skillet. While being flipped in the pan, Tweety lands upon the top of the stove, requiring Sylvester to reach for him. Struggling to reach him, Sylvester places his hand on the hot stove.

While cooling his hand in the snow, the mouse places his tail in a toaster. Sylvester puts out his tail in an ashtray, with which he chases the mouse. He stops to peer in the mouse hole, whereupon the mouse drops a bowling ball on his head. The mouse drags the knocked out Sylvester into the hole but can only fit his leg, which he cooks rotisserie-style over a fire. Sylvester escapes just as Granny arrives with food. Upon opening the pack, it is just more bird seed, much to Sylvester's chagrin. Sylvester, left with no other alternative, begrudgingly eats the bird seed. While doing so in the final act, Tweety asks Sylvester if he likes the bird seed; unknown to any of them, the mouse makes one final attempt at the cat by grabbing the latter's tail and – after pouring milk over it to give it moisture – bites the tail, causing Sylvester to yowl in pain. "It tan't be dat bad!" remarks Tweety.

== Home media ==
- VHS - Looney Tunes: The Collectors Edition Volume 13: Comic Cat-Tastrophies
- VHS - Looney Tunes Presents: Tweety: Home Tweet Home
- VHS - Stars of Space Jam: Sylvester and Tweety
- DVD - Looney Tunes Golden Collection: Volume 2, Disc 3
- DVD - Looney Tunes Super Stars' Tweety & Sylvester: Feline Fwenzy
- Blu-Ray - Looney Tunes Collector's Vault: Volume 1, Disc 2
