= Muzzle Tough =

- Title card
- Directed by: I. Freleng
- Written by: Warren Foster
- Starring: Mel Blanc; Bea Benaderet (uncredited)
- Music by: Carl Stalling
- Animation by: Ken Champin; Virgil Ross; Arthur Davis; Manuel Perez
- Layouts by: Hawley Pratt
- Backgrounds by: Irv Wyner
- Color process: Technicolor
- Production company: Warner Bros. Cartoons
- Distributed by: Warner Bros. Pictures; The Vitaphone Corporation
- Release date: June 26, 1954
- Running time: 7 mins
- Language: English

Muzzle Tough is a 1954 Warner Bros. Merrie Melodies animated cartoon directed by Friz Freleng. The short was released on June 26, 1954, and stars Tweety, Sylvester and Granny.

The title is a play on the Yiddish expression "mazel tov", which roughly translates to "good luck".

== Plot ==
The story begins with Granny and two moving men in their truck (which reads "Checker Movers, It's Your Move") searching for her new house, which they soon find. The movers walk Granny's belongings past Sylvester as he is napping on top of the wall surrounding the house. Sylvester suddenly wakes up when the movers parade Tweety in his cage past him, and Tweety says: "I tawt I taw a puddytat!" Immediately, Sylvester starts to pursue Tweety atop the wall, but then crashes into a lamp post and falls off the wall.

Sylvester climbs back up as Tweety is carried into the house, while another mover sets Hector's doghouse down on the ground. Sylvester steps down upon the roof of the doghouse as he comes down from the wall, and when Hector sees him, he likewise says: "I tawt I taw a puddytat!" Hector then bites Sylvester's tail and chases him back out to the street.

Plotting to get past Hector and finagle his way into the house, Sylvester disguises himself as a lamp, putting a shade on his head. After a mover carries him in and sets him on the table next to Tweety's cage, Tweety plugs Sylvester's tail into the outlet, giving Sylvester a massive electric jolt. Hector bites Sylvester and also gets zapped, then chases him out of the house and back to the street again.

Sylvester then tries posing as one of the movers...and gets Granny's piano loaded into his arms! Tweety guides Sylvester all the way up the stairs to the top floor and through a doorway, which sends Sylvester plummeting with the piano to the street below, prompting Tweety to remark: "Ooooh, dat wast step was a wuwu!"

Making another attempt, Sylvester hides under a bear rug to sneak up on Tweety and climbs up to his cage. Granny, frightened at the sight, thinks the bear had been "playing 'possum for twenty years" and fires several pistol shots at Sylvester (similar to The Fair-Haired Hare a few years earlier) before Hector chases him out again.

Finally, Sylvester goes to the costume shop and dresses up full-body as a voluptuous female dog to lure Hector away from the front steps. As the instantly lovestruck Hector approaches, Sylvester is preparing to knock him out with a mallet, but before he does, a dog catcher captures Sylvester with his net and locks him in his truck. Outraged, Sylvester pounds on the window and tells the dog catcher to let him out, but he is not listening to a word. He then removes the female dog mask from his costume yelling, "I'm not a dog, I'm a cat! K-A-T!"—a fatal error, as all the dogs in the truck notice immediately and begin to attack him as the truck disappears down the street. Tweety then says: "Dere won't be no more puddytats awound to chase me now.", before he sees two cats in the room with lamp shades on their heads, to which he says: "Of tourse, I tould be wong."

== Home media ==
- VHS - Sylvester and Tweety's Tale Feathers
- VHS - Looney Tunes Collectors Edition: Canine Corps
- Blu-Ray - Looney Tunes Collector's Choice: Volume 4 (restored)
