= Coyote vs. Acme =

2026 film by Dave Green

- Theatrical release poster
- Directed by: Dave Green
- Screenplay by: Samy Burch
- Story by: James Gunn; Jeremy Slater; Samy Burch
- Based on: "Coyote v. Acme" by Ian Frazier
- Produced by: Chris DeFaria; James Gunn
- Starring: Will Forte; Lana Condor; Tone Bell; Luis Guzmán; Martha Kelly; P. J. Byrne; Eric Bauza; Kenneth Choi; John Cena
- Cinematography: Brandon Trost
- Edited by: Carsten Kurpanek
- Music by: Steven Price
- Production companies: Warner Animation Group (Note: Warner Bros. Pictures Animation used the Warner Animation Group (WAG) logo as the film completed production prior to the studio's rebranding. It is jokingly listed as a wholly owned subsidiary of the Acme Corporation.); Troll Court Entertainment; Keylight Pictures
- Distributed by: Ketchup Entertainment; Warner Bros. Pictures (Note: Warner Bros. Pictures receives studio credit and is the copyright holder and the co-distributor of the film.)
- Release dates: July 25, 2026 (San Diego Comic-Con); August 28, 2026 (United States)
- Running time: 103 minutes
- Country: United States
- Language: English
- Budget: $70–72 million
- Box office: $126.5 million

Coyote vs. Acme is a 2026 American legal comedy film directed by Dave Green and written by Samy Burch, who developed the story with James Gunn and Jeremy Slater. Loosely based on the 1990 New Yorker magazine article "Coyote v. Acme" by Ian Frazier (itself using elements from the Looney Tunes franchise), it follows Wile E. Coyote as he enlists a billboard attorney to sue the Acme Corporation for repeatedly selling him faulty products. The film, combining live action and animation, stars Will Forte, Lana Condor, Tone Bell, Luis Guzmán, Martha Kelly, P. J. Byrne, Kenneth Choi, and John Cena, with Eric Bauza leading the voice cast in his final film voicing Looney Tunes characters in his lifetime before his death on October 25, 2026.

Development began in 2015 with Gunn pitching Coyote vs. Acme to Warner Bros., which led to Slater writing an early draft of the screenplay. In 2018, Chris McKay signed on as producer and Jon and Josh Silberman as screenwriters. Green was hired to direct in December 2019, with Burch joining the following year. Cena, Forte, and Condor were cast in early 2022. Live-action filming took place in New Mexico from March to May 2022. The film was produced by Warner Animation Group, Keylight Pictures, and Gunn's production company Troll Court Entertainment.

Warner Bros. Discovery initially shelved Coyote vs. Acme in November 2023 to obtain a tax write-off but, following public backlash, later reversed its decision and allowed the filmmakers to seek other distributors. After several unsuccessful negotiations with various distributors, Ketchup Entertainment acquired the rights for $50 million in March 2025, after previously doing so for Warner Bros. Animation's Looney Tunes film The Day the Earth Blew Up (2024).

Coyote vs. Acme screened at San Diego Comic-Con on July 25, 2026, and was theatrically released in the United States on August 28, 2026. It received positive reviews from critics, and grossed $126 million worldwide on a budget of $70–72 million.

== Plot ==
In 1992, in a world where cartoon characters co-exist with humans, Acme Corporation scientist Dr. Lorre leaks a message to an unknown contact before being captured and imprisoned inside an Acme portable hole.

Thirty years later, Wile E. Coyote fails to catch the Road Runner and sees a television ad for Avery, Jones & Maltese, a personal injury law firm in Albuquerque specializing in cartoon violence cases involving Acme products. Wile E. meets with senior partner Kevin Avery, looking to sue Acme for the various defective devices used in chasing the Road Runner. While Kevin's niece and intern Paige is eager to take Acme to court, Kevin prefers to settle to avoid a risky trial. However, Wile E. rejects the settlement offered by Acme's lawyer Buddy Crane, forcing a trial.

The firm tries to subpoena the Road Runner to testify, but he evades them. Meanwhile, Acme CEO Foghorn Leghorn warns Buddy to prevent the trial from revealing any corporate secrets. After a poor first trial session, Kevin receives a tip from an anonymous whistleblower to meet with former Acme employee Daffy Duck, who conveys the warning Lorre sent him in 1992 about "Project Sisyphus". Kevin admits to Wile E. that he tries to settle all cases due to having lost multiple trials early in his career, but Wile E. encourages Kevin to believe he can beat Acme the same way Wile E. believes he will catch the Road Runner. Though this inspires Kevin, he soon discovers Wile E.'s motive for the lawsuit is to capture the Road Runner in court. Acme attempts to catch the Road Runner, believing he will testify against Wile E. given their past, but the Road Runner evades them. Meanwhile, Paige learns from Lorre's wife Granny that, before his disappearance, Lorre did product development for Acme, who now force their pet Tweety to serve as Acme's mercenary.

The team discovers the whistleblower is Bugs Bunny, who reveals Project Sisyphus is a product testing program formerly headed by Dr. Lorre, using cartoon violence to improve Acme's products for humans. When the program drove its test subjects insane, Lorre tried to object, but was silenced, and Acme pivoted to testing in the wild on unsuspecting clients like Wile E. Off Bugs' suggestion, Kevin tries to get Project Sisyphus on the record by questioning Acme's Head of PR Tasmanian Devil on the stand, but Acme's legal team sabotage him and Judge Troppogrosso dismisses the case.

However, Kevin reveals the conspiracy to the press, prompting the government to call a congressional hearing in Washington, D.C. Wile E. only agrees to join when Kevin claims the Road Runner will be there. The night before the hearing, Kevin admits the truth after being badgered about it and berates Wile E. for his obsession with the Road Runner, prompting Wile E. to storm out. While wandering the streets, Wile E. narrowly evades Tweety's attempt to kill him. Kevin tries to rescue him, but gets knocked out and separated when Wile E. abandons him once again, still offended.

Kevin rejects a last bribe attempt by Buddy and gives an impassioned speech at the hearing, admiring Wile E.'s determination despite repeated failures. Wile E. arrives, having overheard, and reconciles with Kevin. Kevin gets Foghorn to publicly admit to Project Sisyphus, but Foghorn argues that cartoon characters are not important enough for anyone to care if they are harmed. However, the Road Runner arrives and testifies to the harm Acme products have caused Wile E. over the years and further explains as Wile E.'s friend that he cares for and misses him, moving Wile E. to spare him. Senator Elmer Fudd declines to pursue federal charges due to Wile E. being the sole plaintiff. As Buddy and Foghorn gloat, Wile E. activates the trap he had set for the Road Runner, caging and humiliating the Acme team.

Back in Albuquerque, the firm is inundated with cartoon characters also seeking to sue Acme for damages. Further leaks from Bugs launch a federal investigation that exposes the full extent of Project Sisyphus and leads to the arrests of Foghorn and Buddy. Dr. Lorre is freed and reunites with Granny and Tweety. Wile E. bids goodbye to Kevin and Paige, who is now a partner at the firm, before reuniting with the Road Runner and resuming their chase.

== Cast ==
- Will Forte as Kevin Avery, a down-and-out billboard attorney and member of Avery, Jones & Maltese who becomes Wile E. Coyote's lawyer. He is named for Looney Tunes animator Tex Avery.
- Lana Condor as Paige Avery, Kevin's niece and an intern at Avery, Jones & Maltese.
- John Cena as Buddy Crane, the Acme Corporation's lawyer who was Kevin's rival at Harvard Law School.
- Tone Bell as Sal Maltese, a partner of Kevin and Dottie at Avery, Jones & Maltese. He is named for Looney Tunes screenwriter Michael Maltese, co-creator of Wile E. Coyote and the Road Runner.
- Martha Kelly as Dottie Jones, a partner of Kevin and Sal at Avery, Jones & Maltese. She is named for Looney Tunes animator Chuck Jones, co-creator of Wile E. Coyote and the Road Runner.
- Luis Guzmán as Judge Troppogrosso, a strict and no-nonsense judge overseeing the trial between Wile E. Coyote and the Acme Corporation.
- P. J. Byrne as Bill Pelicanos, an Acme Corporation lawyer.
- John Early as Henry Heslop, a local Albuquerque television news anchor.
- Nancy Linehan Charles as Cherry, the manager of the Prickly Pear Motel where Kevin lives.
- Kenneth Choi as Oscar Jeon, an Albuquerque lawyer.
- Ernie Vigil as Talon, an Acme enforcer working with Tweety to silence Kevin and Wile E.

=== Voices ===
- Eric Bauza as:
  - Bugs Bunny, a whistleblower who assists the firm in learning about Project Sisyphus. Archival audio of Mel Blanc taken from The Ducksters is used for Bugs' screaming. Bugs Bunny's informant role is a reference to Deep Throat as portrayed in the film All the President's Men.
  - Charlie Dog, a clerk at Avery, Jones & Maltese
  - Daffy Duck, a former Acme test subject driven insane by Project Sisyphus and confined at the St. Looney's for the Exceptionally Looney asylum
  - Dr. Peter Lorre, an Acme corporation scientist
  - Foghorn Leghorn, the crooked CEO of the Acme Corporation
  - Gossamer, the process server at Avery, Jones & Maltese
  - Pepé Le Pew, a flirtatious skunk who was one of Acme Labs' test subjects
  - Porky Pig, an Albuquerque local and occasional client of Avery, Jones & Maltese
  - Senator Elmer Fudd, the senatorial chairman of the congressional hearing
  - The Road Runner, a key witness being sought for Wile E.'s trial. While Bauza voices the Road Runner when testifying before Congress, archival audio of background artist Paul Julian is used for the rest of his dialogue.
  - Tweety, Granny and Dr. Lorre's pet bird who is forced to serve as a mercenary for the Acme Corporation in order to protect Granny after Dr. Lorre's imprisonment
- Candi Milo as:
  - Granny, Dr. Lorre's reclusive wife
  - Witch Hazel, an employee at Avery, Jones & Maltese
  - Miss Prissy, a hen serving on the jury at the trial
- Jim Cummings as the Tasmanian Devil (Taz), the head of the Acme Corporation's Public Relations

== Production ==
=== Development and writing ===
The film is loosely based on Ian Frazier's 1990 New Yorker legal piece parody "Coyote v. Acme", which imagines Wile E. Coyote suing the Acme Company for consistently selling him defective and inaccurately labeled products. A three-part series with the same premise, "Cliff-hanger Justice" by Joey Green, had previously been published in National Lampoon in 1982, though Frazier was unaware of it when writing "Coyote v. Acme". Scott Rudin Productions bought the rights to Frazier's article in 1998 but could not get permission from Warner Bros. to film it. The options finally lapsed in 2006 before James Gunn successfully pitched the film to Warner in 2015. Gunn asked Jeremy Slater to write the film's first draft due to their friendship, which included growing up with Looney Tunes. The screenplay had some limitations due to other projects in development—Bugs Bunny and Daffy Duck were off-limits, for example. The Tasmanian Devil had a notable appearance in Slater's script. Gunn and Slater agreed that Wile E. should be a lovable loser who never speaks and is closer to a pet dog than a villain or the butt of a joke. Though Warner rejected Slater's screenplay, its ethos informed the final draft.

In August 2018, Warner Bros. Pictures announced the development of a Wile E. Coyote project, titled Coyote vs. Acme, with The Lego Batman Movie (2017) director Chris McKay as producer and Jon and Josh Silberman writing the script. In mid-December 2019, Warner Animation Group hired Dave Green to direct the live-action/animated hybrid film, while Jon and Josh Silberman were replaced as screenwriters, but remained producers. In December 2020, McKay left the project, while the Silbermans left their producing roles and returned to screenwriting duties alongside Samy Burch, Slater and Gunn. In March 2023, the film's final writing credits were given: Burch received sole credit for the screenplay and shared credit for the story with Slater and Gunn, while off-screen additional literary credit was given to Alex Cuthbertson, Jacob Fleisher, Matt Fusfeld, Dan Goor, BenDavid Grabinski, Craig Wright and Jon & Josh Silberman. Gunn, alongside Tom & Jerry (2021) producer Chris DeFaria, also received final credit as producers on the film, with Gunn under his production banner Two Monkeys, A Goat and Another, Dead, Monkey.

In November 2022, Foghorn Leghorn, Granny, Sylvester the Cat and Tweety were confirmed to be in the film. In December, Bugs Bunny, Daffy Duck, Elmer Fudd and Yosemite Sam were also confirmed to be in the film. In January 2023, Porky Pig was also confirmed to be in the film. Editor Carsten Kurpanek described the film's story as a "David vs. Goliath story" that tackles Wile E. Coyote's persistence in the face of the Acme Corporation's "cynical and casual cruelness of capitalism and corporate greed."

Green said his initial approach to the material was to combine a true-crime documentary with a legal drama. He cited The Insider (1999), Erin Brockovich (2000), and A Few Good Men (1992) as influences, with the human characters treating Wile E. Coyote's lawsuit and the surrounding cartoon logic as part of everyday life. Green also said that the tone of Frazier's original article—treating Acme's product liability in the language of a legal filing—was central to the adaptation, allowing the filmmakers to combine serious legal conventions with the physical comedy of the Looney Tunes.

=== Casting ===
In February 2022, John Cena was cast as the film's secondary antagonist, described as the lawyer in defense of Acme and the former boss to Wile E.'s lawyer; he previously collaborated with Gunn on the DC Extended Universe (DCEU) projects The Suicide Squad (2021) and Peacemaker (2022–25). On March 9, Will Forte and Lana Condor were added to the cast, with the former starring as Wile E.'s lawyer.

=== Filming and production design ===
Principal photography took place from March to May 2022 in Albuquerque, New Mexico, with Brandon Trost serving as cinematographer. The creative team acknowledged Who Framed Roger Rabbit (1988) as a reference for the film's live-action interaction with animated characters. New Mexico Film Office director Amber Dodson commented in a press release that the production would "showcase our beautiful city as an already iconic location and setting in the Looney [Tunes] cartoons." David Barclay built a life-size puppet of Wile E. Coyote for the actors to interact with. The most difficult sequence Dave Green had to film was on the second day of filming, where Wile E. tries to bring all kinds of weapons and gadgets through a metal detector. Green had to get roughly a few dozen background actors to locate the eyeline of an invisible character. Despite the difficulty, Green called the sequence his favorite.

=== Visual effects and animation ===
Frame from the film featuring Will Forte and Lana Condor alongside Wile E. Coyote, which was leaked following its initial cancellation. It appears at 29:38 in the final film.

Visual effects and computer animation were provided by DNEG for Wile E. Coyote and other major Looney Tunes characters. According to Green, the 3D animators worked closely with a team of 2D artists, who guided them with drawn poses and expressions of the characters in order to "[find] the building blocks of performance." Editor Carsten Kurpanek explained that "artists would do [black-and-white] line drawings of key poses over a rough edit first," which were later used as reference for visual effects and animation; this process was dubbed "sketchviz" by the crew. Traditional animation services were also provided by Duncan Studio, for "a handful of shots" with the significant Looney Tunes characters in the film and for "certain [Looney Tunes] characters [who] were handled entirely in 2D." One of these characters was Bugs Bunny, which occurred because he was not originally planned to be in the film: the Acme whistleblower was scripted as an escaped Dr. Lorre. When this was changed in post-production, it was more productive to fully animate Bugs in 2D than to fit him into the cel-shaded 3D animation. Condor was unaware of this change and was starstruck at the "funeral screening" in 2023 when she learned her scene partner was Bugs Bunny.

=== Music ===
Following the announcement of the film's initial cancellation, Steven Price announced that he composed the film's score. He shared a choir rendition of the Road Runner's vocal effects set to Pyotr Ilyich Tchaikovsky's "1812 Overture" titled the "Meep Meep Choir".

The soundtrack was released through WaterTower Music digitally on August 21, 2026, one week before the film's release. A physical vinyl release of the album is planned for the first quarter of 2027 through iam8bit and WaterTower Music. The film also features the DJ Shadow and Run the Jewels song "Nobody Speak".

== Themes and analysis ==
Critics discussed the treatment of corporate power, consumer culture, and its parallels with the circumstances surrounding its attempted shelving. Catherine Wheatley of Sight and Sound described Wile E. Coyote as a "high usage user" of Acme products who remains trapped in a cycle of consuming products that repeatedly fail him. She described Kevin Avery's struggle against Acme as "Capra-esque", comparing him to a modern-day James Stewart and noting parallels with Mr. Smith Goes to Washington (1939) and It Happened One Night (1934). Wheatley characterized the film as both a family movie and political satire, with elements of the courtroom drama and 1970s conspiracy thriller.

Justin Chang of The New Yorker noted a parallel between the film's story of an underdog confronting a powerful corporation and its own history at Warner Bros. Discovery, describing the premise as a metaphor for the circumstances surrounding its attempted shelving. Chang also emphasized Wile E.'s persistence in the face of repeated failure, noting that the screenplay refers to Sisyphus more than once. British litigator David Allen Green has called the movie "a good—indeed great—film about commercial law". He emphasised the realism in the attempts by lawyers to reach a settlement, the importance of evidence discovery and the motivation of the parties involved.

== Cancellation ==
Coyote vs. Acme was initially planned to be theatrically released in the United States on July 21, 2023, by Warner Bros. Pictures. On April 26, 2022, Warner Bros. Entertainment removed it from its release schedule, replacing it with Barbie. On November 9, 2023, Warner Bros. Entertainment announced that Coyote vs Acme was complete but that they would not release it as Warner Bros. Discovery preferred to claim a tax loss of about $30 million. This would make it the third film to be canceled by Warner Bros. Discovery for tax purposes, following Batgirl and Scoob! Holiday Haunt, neither of which finished post-production. The crew was not informed until after the film was completed.

The move drew criticism from filmmakers, animation outlets, and talent representatives. Several filmmakers left angry phone calls with Warner Bros. expressing their frustration at the move, while others canceled meetings with the studio in protest. Many noted that the film had drawn praise at test screenings and interest from potential buyers. Green voiced his disappointment, writing "we were all determined to honor the legacies of these historic characters and actually get them right".

=== Reversal ===
On November 13, 2023, Puck reported Warner Bros. Discovery leaders had reversed their decision and allowed the filmmakers the option to shop Coyote vs. Acme to other distributors. Deadline Hollywood reported that Amazon MGM Studios, Apple Studios, and Netflix were interested in buying the distribution rights. TheWrap reported that despite interest from distributors there were "currently no hard offers, and that Green is crafting his own 'PR campaign'." On December 8, Deadline Hollywood reported that the film had been screened for more studios, including Paramount Pictures and Sony Pictures. Of these, Netflix and Paramount had made bids, with Paramount including a theatrical component; Amazon was still interested despite making no formal bids; and Sony and Apple were not planning to make bids.

On February 9, 2024, TheWrap reported that Warner Bros. Discovery had rejected the bids from Netflix, Amazon, and Paramount. Warner Bros. had wanted $75–$80 million, but no distributors met their price, and Warner Bros. Discovery rejected counterbids. They considered deleting the film and claim it as a tax loss. Following their Q4 2023 earnings call on February 23, 2024, Warner Bros. Discovery took a $115 million write-down while not directly confirming the cancellation.

On March 10, 2024, during the red carpet for the 96th Academy Awards, Burch said conversations were still ongoing within Warner Bros. and that "we hope it will somehow find its home and not end up stuck in a vault for the rest of time." In April, a Warner Bros. spokesperson told The New York Times that it "remains available for acquisition".

=== Responses ===
Dedicated to everyone who posted, shared, held up signs and spoke out when it counted. This film made it to the big screen because of you.

— The dedication that appears at the end of the film's credits sequence

Following TheWrap's report, hashtags such as #ReleaseCoyoteVsAcme and #SaveCoyoteVsAcme trended for several weeks. Eric Bauza addressed this in an improvised exchange between Bugs Bunny and Daffy Duck during his speech at the 51st Annie Awards, saying "I hate to be political, but release Coyote vs. Acme!" as Daffy Duck.

Industry figures who saw Coyote vs. Acme included Phil Lord and Christopher Miller, Michael Chaves, and Daniel Scheinert. Lord called it "wonderful" and "moving", and lamented that Warner Bros.' move was "anticompetitive", while Miller said he hoped "several studios go after it so the world can see all the good work people did." The writer-director BenDavid Grabinski said it was "the best of its kind since Who Framed Roger Rabbit", while the filmmaker Brian Duffield, who gave notes on the film, compared it to Barbie, feeling that both "[play] with iconography in a really fun, popcorn kind of way". In an interview with Screen Rant on May 31, 2024, Adil El Arbi and Bilall Fallah, directors of the canceled Batgirl film, said they were friends with Green and said, "I think that movies must be seen by the audience, and the audience must judge them."

In February 2024, Forte released a public statement addressed to the cast and crew after seeing the final cut of the film: "I know that a lot of you haven't gotten a chance to see our movie. [...] Please know that all the years and years of hard work, dedication and love that you put into this movie shows in every frame." In January 2025, Condor revealed the film had had a "funeral screening" when news of the initial cancellation broke.

=== Sale to Ketchup Entertainment ===
On March 19, 2025, Deadline reported that Ketchup Entertainment was in talks to acquire all rights for Coyote vs. Acme from Warner Bros. for approximately $50 million, following its acquisition of the North American distribution rights to The Day the Earth Blew Up. On March 31, Deadline confirmed that Warner Bros. completed the sale. On May 8, Deadline reported that the film was set for international sales at the Cannes Film Market through Kinology, with footage available for buyers and a potential market screening.

== Release ==
On March 31, 2025, it was announced that Coyote vs. Acme was set for release in 2026, following its acquisition by Ketchup Entertainment. Its release date was announced in July 2025 at San Diego Comic-Con. Coyote vs. Acme premiered at San Diego Comic-Con on July 25, 2026. It was theatrically released in the United Kingdom and Ireland on August 21, 2026, and in the United States on August 28, 2026. Beta Fiction Spain acquired Spanish distribution rights, programming a September 18 theatrical release.

=== Marketing ===
Marketing began in April 2026 with two teaser trailers. The first, released on April 15, shows Wile E. Coyote hanging in the air, then holding up a sign that says "Happy Tax Day" on one side and "Check Your Write-Offs" on the other, then falling off the cliff. The second, released on April 21, features Will Forte doing an intro. The first trailer was released on April 22. It was watched 25.6 million times within 24 hours, a new record for an independent family film. On July 23, the final trailer was released and ticket sales for the film opened. On July 29, a month before the premiere, the final poster was revealed. Reviewers noted that the film's marketing leaned into the tax write-off controversy, using the Acme Corporation as a placeholder for Warner Bros., such as with the slogan "The Movie Acme Doesn't Want You to See". Ketchup revealed that they hired 42West, their go-to public relations agency, and Ryan Reynolds' Maximum Effort for marketing the film, which suggested leaning into the controversy for promoting the film. 42West also was in charge of several promotional appearances involving the cast.

=== Home media ===
On September 29, 2026, Coyote vs. Acme was made available for digital purchase on Amazon Prime Video. It will also be released solely by Ketchup Entertainment on Ultra HD Blu-ray, Blu-ray and DVD on December 1, 2026.

== Reception ==
=== Box office ===
Coyote vs. Acme grossed $60 million in the United States and Canada, and $60 million in other territories, for a worldwide total of $120 million. On October 21, 2026, it was announced that the film surpassed $126.5 million, surpassing Supergirl to become Warner's highest grossing summer release of the year.

In the United States and Canada, Coyote vs. Acme was released alongside Buddy, The Dog Stars, and Idiots, and was projected to gross $12–18 million from 3,555 theaters in its opening weekend. The film made $5.3 million on its first day, including $1.7 million on its Thursday previews. It went on to debut to $15.9 million, finishing second behind holdover Spider-Man: Brand New Day.

=== Critical response ===
On the review aggregator website Rotten Tomatoes, 96% of 302 critics' reviews are positive, with an average rating of 7.9/10. The website's consensus reads: "A daffy satire that's equal parts heart and wily humor, Coyote vs. Acme makes a triumphant case for the Looney Tunes' modern relevance with a sense of good-natured mischief that'd make even Bugs Bunny bow." Metacritic, which uses a weighted average, assigned the film a score of 77 out of 100, based on 46 critics, indicating "generally favorable" reviews. Audiences polled by CinemaScore gave the film an average grade of "A" on an A+ to F scale, while PostTrak reported 93% of audience members gave the film a positive score, with 82% saying they would definitely recommend it.

Brian Tallerico of RogerEbert.com gave the film three out of four stars, writing that it's constantly "clever and funny". Frank Scheck of The Hollywood Reporter wrote that it's "a hilarious delight, one of the best live-action animated films, and will be treasured by Looney Tunes fans (and who isn't one?) who will be thrilled seeing their favorite cartoon characters return to the big screen". Alissa Wilkinson of The New York Times named the film a "Critic's Pick", calling it a "barrel of unhinged delights". Historian Arius Raposas from Medium found the film's unraveling of the relationship between Wile E. Coyote and the Road Runner, and Coyote's perseverance as a character were among its strong points.

=== Accolades ===
Coyote vs. Acme was selected by the Museum of Modern Art for "The Contenders 2026" film series as among "influential, innovative films made in the past 12 months that we believe will stand the test of time" for screenings at the Hammer Museum in Los Angeles, followed by a conversation with director Dave Green and producer Chris DeFaria, and at the Museum of Modern Art in New York.

Award	Date of ceremony	Category	Nominee(s)	Result	Ref.
Nickelodeon Kids' Choice Awards	November 14, 2026	Favorite Movie Actor	John Cena	Nominated	
Nickelodeon Kids' Choice Awards	November 14, 2026	Favorite Villain	John Cena	Nominated	
Hollywood Music in Media Awards	November 18, 2026	Best Original Score – Animated Film	Steven Price	Nominated	
