= Gift Wrapped (film) =

- Title card
- Directed by: I. Freleng
- Story by: Warren Foster
- Starring: Mel Blanc; Bea Benaderet
- Narrated by: Daws Butler
- Edited by: Treg Brown
- Music by: Carl Stalling
- Animation by: Arthur Davis; Manuel Perez; Virgil Ross; Ken Champin
- Layouts by: Hawley Pratt
- Backgrounds by: Irv Wyner
- Color process: Technicolor
- Production company: Warner Bros. Cartoons
- Distributed by: Warner Bros. Pictures
- Release date: February 16, 1952
- Running time: 7 minutes 26 seconds
- Country: United States
- Language: English

Gift Wrapped is a 1952 Warner Bros. Looney Tunes animated cartoon directed by Friz Freleng. The short was released on February 16, 1952, and stars Tweety and Sylvester.

The film is Christmas-themed. Sylvester receives a rubber mouse as his Christmas gift, but he instead wants Granny's gift, Tweety, for himself.

== Plot ==
Sylvester awakes on Christmas morning to find presents under the Christmas tree, but is disappointed when his gift is just a rubber mouse. When he hears singing coming from what appears to be a gift-wrapped birdcage and sees that it is labeled for Granny, he looks inside and sees Tweety. Deciding he wants Tweety as his present, he switches the tags on the gifts just as Granny comes downstairs.

Granny gives the cage to Sylvester and opens the box with the rubber mouse. Believing it to be a mix-up, she goes to give Sylvester his box and correct the mistake, but once she sees a satisfied Sylvester hiccup Tweety's feathers, she immediately gets wise and makes the cat spit up the bird by whopping him. After a thorough scolding, Granny insists that Sylvester kiss Tweety under a sprig of mistletoe, but the now-sulking cat eats Tweety again instead, leading to another forced regurgitation.

Granny places Tweety's cage on a pole where she thinks Sylvester won't be able to reach it, but the ever-resourceful feline is determined to get his meal. On his first attempt, Tweety points out a huge present waiting under the Christmas tree. Sylvester immediately abandons the bird in his greed, runs to the package and opens it with relish, only to find it is Hector the Bulldog, who promptly eats Sylvester. Granny immediately forces Hector to spit out Sylvester and drags him out of the house.

Meanwhile, Sylvester resumes his attempts to get to Tweety with the following tricks, all ending in failure:

- First, he tries reeling in Tweety's cage with a toy steam crane at the top of the staircase landing. An angry Granny, armed with a broomstick, is waiting at the end of the claw instead and chases Sylvester off with it.
- From the attic, the cat makes a hole in the floor and then uses a hook to grab the latch at the top of Tweety's cage. Tweety, observing, "That puddy tat sure doesn't get discouraged," replaces himself in the cage with a stick of lit dynamite, which detonates just seconds after the cage is pulled into the attic. After replacing the wrecked cage, a dazed and blackened Sylvester stumbles down the stairs.
- During a Western-style showdown with Tweety, Sylvester-as-Geronimo sneaks up the Christmas tree and snickers as Tweety (playing Hopalong Cassidy) points a pop gun at the cat and says, "Stick 'em up, Geronimo!" ... only for the gun to blast a real gunshot in the cat's face when the stopper is pulled out ("Okay, Hoppy, I'm pullin' ya cork!"). An irritated Sylvester uses his bow and arrow to capture the bird. Still, seconds before he can consume his prize, Granny shoots a toilet plunger over the cat's mouth ("You didn't count on Pocahontas, did you, Geronimo?").

In the final gag, Tweety is playing on his new train set in the living room when Sylvester sneaks in with some spare train tracks and sets them up to point the train toward his open mouth, then sets the train in reverse. After devouring Tweety in one bite, Sylvester, in turn, is eaten whole by Hector, who has somehow gotten back into the house. An outraged Granny makes both dog and cat spit up their respective prey and, having had enough of their carnivorous pursuits, declares in her rage that she will ensure that there will be peace in the house once and for all as she drags both of them out of the room.

The cartoon ends during the evening with Granny (while playing the pipe organ) and Tweety (the only one of the animals who has behaved) singing a variation of the Christmas carol "Hark! The Herald Angels Sing". On Tweety's right and left are a very irritated Sylvester and Hector, both with giant Christmas tree stamps taped all over their mouths by Granny to prevent any more trouble from either of them.

== Cast ==
- Mel Blanc as Tweety, Sylvester, and Hector
- Bea Benaderet as Granny
- Daws Butler as Narrator

== Home media ==
- Looney Tunes Golden Collection: Volume 2
- Looney Tunes Super Stars' Tweety & Sylvester: Feline Fwenzy
- Looney Tunes Platinum Collection: Volume 2

== See also ==
- List of Christmas films
