= Tweet and Lovely =

1959 film by Friz Freleng

- Directed by: Friz Freleng
- Story by: Warren Foster
- Starring: Mel Blanc
- Edited by: Treg Brown
- Music by: Milt Franklyn
- Animation by: Virgil Ross; Gerry Chiniquy; Art Davis; Harry Love (effects animation, uncredited)
- Layouts by: Hawley Pratt
- Backgrounds by: Tom O'Loughlin
- Color process: Technicolor
- Production company: Warner Bros. Cartoons
- Distributed by: Warner Bros. Pictures; The Vitaphone Corporation
- Release date: July 18, 1959
- Running time: 6 minutes
- Language: English

Tweet and Lovely is a 1959 Warner Bros. Merrie Melodies cartoon directed by Friz Freleng. The short was released on July 18, 1959, and stars Tweety and Sylvester.

== Plot ==
Sylvester hears Tweety singing and looks through the window with his telescope in his apartment building next to Tweety's yard. Tweety sees him, grabs a towel, exclaims "I taw I taw a peeping tom cat!", and shuts the door after saying "That nasty old peeping tom cat!".

Sylvester sees Spike sleeping next to the pole that holds Tweety's birdhouse. He sneaks and climbs the pole. Spike awakens and pulls him down. Sylvester smiles and pushes Spike's straight face into a happy face, but Spike changes his face to furious and chases him back to his apartment.

Sylvester uses a grabber to grab Tweety. Tweety avoids it until Spike climbs up a ladder and uses the grabber to knock Sylvester repeatedly against the wall, while Tweety scolds Sylvester saying, "Bad Old Puddy Tat!".

Sylvester builds a robot dog, but it attacks him, so he destroys it with a baseball bat.

Sylvester makes a smoke bomb and dashes into the smoke-covered yard, bumping into Spike, who then pounds him before sending him out of the yard.

Sylvester uses a pogo stick to approach Tweety's birdhouse, passing Spike and grabs Tweety. As he is about to pogo away, Spike opens a manhole. Sylvester falls in and he nicely makes Tweety escape but, Spike drops the lid with 4 holes on Sylvester's head.

Sylvester makes a storm cloud formula to prevent Spike from coming, but he trips, creating a storm in his room instead.

Sylvester makes himself invisible using vanishing cream, hits Spike with a brick and grabs Tweety. As Sylvester climbs down the pole, Tweety wonders why he is floating. Spike sprays Sylvester with green paint, forces him to give him Tweety and punches the cat out of the yard.

On the night, in a final attempt to get rid of Spike, Sylvester makes a bomb camera. Then, takes it and runs to Spike's yard. But it goes off too quick and explodes. Sylvester appears as a ghost with angel wings, rips up the blueprints saying "Hmph! It's a good thing pussycats have got nine lives". Sylvester leaves the building and presumed heads for heaven.

== Home media ==
This short is available on disc 1 of the Looney Tunes Collector's Vault: Volume 1 Blu-ray set.

Preceded by Trick or Tweet	Tweety and Sylvester cartoons 1959	Succeeded by Cat's Paw
