= King Tweety =

- DVD cover
- Directed by: Careen Ingle
- Screenplay by: Erik Adolphson; Careen Ingle
- Story by: Erik Adolphson
- Based on: Looney Tunes by Warner Bros.; Sylvester the Cat by Friz Freleng; Tweety by Bob Clampett
- Produced by: Kandace Reuter; Careen Ingle
- Starring: Eric Bauza; Flula Borg; Carlease Burke; Jon Daly; Regi Davis; Dana DeLorenzo; Riki Lindhome; Candi Milo; Maya Lynne Robinson; Nicole Thurman; Mark Whitten
- Edited by: Cris Mertens; Kyle Stafford
- Music by: Nick Keller
- Production company: Warner Bros. Animation
- Distributed by: Warner Bros. Home Entertainment (Studio Distribution Services)
- Release dates: June 14, 2022 (DVD); November 19, 2022 (Cartoon Network); November 20, 2022 (HBO Max)
- Running time: 72 minutes
- Country: United States
- Language: English

King Tweety is a 2022 American animated direct-to-video comedy film starring the Looney Tunes characters Tweety and Sylvester, produced by Warner Bros. Animation. It is the first new Looney Tunes direct-to-video film since Looney Tunes: Rabbits Run (2015), the second direct-to-video animated film starring Tweety after 2000's Tweety's High-Flying Adventure, and the first Looney Tunes film to be directed by a woman.

== Plot ==
Tweety, Sylvester and Granny learn from the evening news that Aoogah, the bird queen of the Canary Islands, has mysteriously disappeared. But they also discover that Tweety has all the traits that identify him as a member of the royal bird family. The kingdom offers to fly Tweety and Granny from their home in New York to the islands, where Tweety will then become king. But the kingdom forbids cats from entering. Nevertheless, Sylvester stows away on the plane. When he is found out, Tweety demands that he stay in the kingdom, describing him as his "brother'.

The trio meets Diego von Schniffenstein, the royal advisor to the monarchs who's also a sorcerer. He takes Tweety and Sylvester on a tour of the kingdom, which is inhabited by birds and dogs. Diego explains that the kingdom's name means "islands of dogs". At the royal palace, Diego show the two portraits of many past rulers, and then the luxurious accommodations Tweety will have as king. Sylvester and Diego both help Tweety dress for a lavish coronation ceremony later that night.

At the coronation, Sylvester discovers it was Diego who was behind Aoogah's disappearance, and now he was plotting against Tweety. Sylvester spends the next day foiling Diego's attempts to assassinate Tweety while trying to find evidence against Diego. At last, he finds Diego and his henchdogs forming new evil plans. But Tweety sneaks up on Sylvester, and he gets both of them caught. Diego seizes Tweety and frames Sylvester for eating him. Two police birds arrest Sylvester, refusing to listen to his claims.

Granny appears, having seen the evidence against Diego. She breaks Sylvester out of prison, but the two don't know where to search for Tweety. It turns out the tail feathers of members of the royal bird family possess magic. So Granny and Sylvester use a feather to track Tweety down to a ship off shore. Inside the ship, Tweety finds Aoogah still alive but held captive. Diego reveals to them that 700 years ago, he used a potion to make himself immortal. He tried to lead an uprising of dogs against the birds, but the uprising failed. Since then, he has been secretly killing off the monarchs and collecting their tail feathers. Diego fashions the feathers into a boa that greatly multiplies his magical ability.

Granny diverts and then subdues the police birds, allowing for Sylvester to sneak aboard the ship. He defeats the henchdogs and frees Tweety and Aoogah. But then Diego uses the boa to turn himself into a giant with tremendous amounts of magic power. But Sylvester distracts Diego long enough for the birds to disassemble the boa. The feathers then turn into the spirits of past rulers. With the help of these ancestors, Tweety, Sylvester and Aoogah are able to beat Diego.

In the aftermath, Granny, Tweety and Sylvester all admit that they're stressed from all the danger, and they miss their home in New York. So Tweety returns the crown to Aoogah. But Aoogah herself feels exhausted and wants a vacation. The closing credits show photos of Aoogah with the trio, the trio having brought her to New York for a vacation.

== Voice Cast ==
- Eric Bauza as Sylvester, Tweety, Larry Bird, Handsome Stewart
- Flula Borg as Harold, Thaddeus Fishley Esq., Enthusiastic Crowdgoer
- Carlease Burke as Queen Honk, Candice the Crane
- Jon Daly as Diego von Schniffenstein
- Regi Davis as Rodrigo the Dog, Charlie "Bird" Parker, an Owl
- Dana DeLorenzo as Izza
- Careen Ingle as Floorbo
- Riki Lindhome as Royal Assistant Beep Beep
- Candi Milo as Granny, Green Bean, Lady Bird Johnson
- Nicole Thurman as Aoogah, Melaney Blank
- Mark Whitten as Officer Siedes, John Foray

== Reception ==
Common Sense Media gave the film 3 out of 5 stars. Jennifer Borget, writing for it, "This is a silly caper in the tradition of classic Warner Bros. cartoons. While there's not as much over-the-top slapstick violence and pratfalls as in the 'toons of yesteryear, King Tweety still has its fair share of scenes in which Sylvester is, among other things, chopped up by a ceiling fan, burned by lava, and beaten by dog bones until an exaggerated lump forms on the crown of his feline head. While the story is very much for kids, there are also moments of relatively sophisticated humor intended for older audiences, including an absurdly funny aside concerning the hit 1980s song "Jessie's Girl" by Rick Springfield. While the meta humor is refreshing compared to kids' entertainment that doesn't even bother trying to provide something for the adults watching, overall King Tweety is still a pretty standard story. On the plus side, with no disrespect intended toward the great Mel Blanc, it's worth noting that there is refreshing diversity in the voice cast. All in all, this is an enjoyable, if not unforgettable, update on classic cartoon characters." Alexandria Ingram of FanSided said "This is a fun-filled adventure, perfect for all ages. It's packed with vibrant, modern animation and some excellent songs you'll find everyone dancing along with."

== Release ==
The film was released on DVD and digital on June 14, 2022, with three episodes of The Sylvester & Tweety Mysteries ("Something Fishy Around Here", "The Maltese Canary" and "The Cat Who Knew Too Much") as bonus features.

The film later premiered on Cartoon Network on November 19, 2022, with it premiering on HBO Max the following day.
