= Tweet Zoo =

- Title card
- Directed by: Friz Freleng
- Story by: Warren Foster
- Starring: Mel Blanc (all voices)
- Music by: Milt Franklyn
- Animation by: Gerry Chiniquy; Virgil Ross; Arthur Davis
- Layouts by: Hawley Pratt
- Color process: Technicolor
- Production company: Warner Bros. Cartoons
- Distributed by: Warner Bros. Pictures
- Release dates: May 29, 1957 (original); May 26, 1962 (reissue)
- Running time: 7 mins
- Language: English

Tweet Zoo is a 1957 Warner Bros. Merrie Melodies animated short directed by Friz Freleng. Originally released on January 12, 1957 (before being re-issued on May 26, 1962), this short stars Tweety and Sylvester.

Audio from this cartoon was sampled by Paul McCartney on the song "Check My Machine", released in 1980 as the B-side to the single "Waterfalls".

== Plot ==
The cartoon, set in a city zoo, begins with a tour guide showing various animal exhibits to visitors. The final stop (at least as far as viewers can see) is the exhibit featuring the "one and only example" of the Tweety Bird species. This draws tag-along tourist Sylvester's interest and becomes separated from the group. After the requisite "I tawt I taw a puddy tat" lines, Sylvester begins his latest pursuit.

The attempts, all unsuccessful, are as follows:

- Tweety taking refuge in the bear pit. Sylvester uses a net to try to capture the bird, but as the shifty Tweety dodges the net, the cat hits a bear with the net. The bear grabs the net, pulls Sylvester in and expresses his displeasure.
- At feeding time, Sylvester hides in the zookeeper's meat cart. Hoping to get "fed" to Tweety, he instead is thrown to a pack of Bengal tigers.
- Tweety hides in a hole inside the elephant's abode. Sylvester enters in search of his prey, but the elephant immediately covers the hole to protect the bird. After unsuccessfully trying to pry the elephant's leg off the hole, Sylvester kicks the elephant in the knee, stubbing his toes in the process. Sylvester uses a wind-up mouse to frighten the elephant, but instead of simply moving away, the elephant inadvertently jumps and lands on Sylvester, flattening the puss. the cat hits the elephant with a stick to going away in a bad mood.
- Sylvester catches Tweety walking along a bridge, and chases him onto a tree branch overlooking an alligator pond. While planning how to get in the pond without injury, a lion roars, scaring Sylvester and stopping him from pacing back and forth. Sylvester smashes an oar over the lion's head in anger, using the requisite "Ah, shaddap!".
- In a second attempt to navigate the alligator pond, Sylvester uses a rowboat, unaware of his passenger, the lion from earlier has entered. However, he escapes upon discovering the lion. The boat consequently sinks under the lion's weight, and the alligators snap at the lion. Once the lion regains his senses and gets out of the water, he grabs Sylvester and, after letting the gators have another go at the cat, he kicks him back into the bear's pit, where the bear mauls the puddy again.
- Sylvester pole-vaults across the alligator pond to grab Tweety, who is hiding in a tree. Instead, the jump is mistimed (Tweety dropped a banana peel) and the cat ends up in the water again, though he manages to fight off the gators with his now-broken pole and escape (for once) unharmed.

In the end, a frustrated Sylvester leaves the zoo and strikes birds off his diet list. In response, a cluster of birds land on his shoulders and head as he is walking away, muttering about his awful timing for going on a diet.

== Home media ==
The short is available on the "Stars Of Space Jam: Sylvester and Tweety" VHS.

== See also ==
- List of American films of 1957
