= Tweety's High-Flying Adventure =

2000 animated film

- Directed by: Karl Torege; Charles Visser; James T. Walker; Kyung Won Lim
- Written by: Tom Minton; Tim Cahill; Julie McNally-Cahill
- Based on: Looney Tunes by Warner Bros. Around the World in Eighty Days by: Jules Verne
- Produced by: Tom Minton; James T. Walker
- Starring: Joe Alaskey; June Foray; Jeff Bennett; Jim Cummings; Tress MacNeille; Frank Welker; Rob Paulsen
- Cinematography: Amanda Atkinson
- Edited by: Rob Desales
- Music by: J. Eric Schmidt
- Production companies: Warner Bros. Television Animation; Warner Bros. Family Entertainment
- Distributed by: Warner Home Video
- Release dates: September 12, 2000 (VHS); September 11, 2007 (DVD)
- Running time: 72 minutes
- Country: United States
- Language: English

Tweety's High-Flying Adventure is a 2000 American animated musical slapstick comedy film produced by Tom Minton and James T. Walker for Warner Bros. Television Animation, written by Tom Minton, Tim Cahill and Julie McNally, and directed by James T. Walker, Karl Toerge, Charles Visser, and Kyung Won Lim, starring Tweety (Joe Alaskey).

The film also features other Looney Tunes characters such as Sylvester (as the main antagonist), Bugs Bunny, Daffy Duck (all three are also voiced by Alaskey), Yosemite Sam (Jim Cummings), Shropshire Slasher (as the secondary antagonist), Foghorn Leghorn (Jeff Bennett), and Taz (Cummings). Lola Bunny also makes multiple cameo appearances as a news reporter. The animation was made overseas by the South Korean animation company Koko Enterprises. The movie is an updated spoof based on the novel Around the World in Eighty Days by Jules Verne.

== Plot ==
On 2 October, Colonel Rimfire, at the Looney Club in London, announces his beliefs that cats are the most intelligent animals (after his many plans were foiled by Cool Cat). Granny, hoping to raise money for a nearby children's park that closes in 80 days, makes a wager that her Tweety can fly around the world in 80 days, collecting the pawprints of 80 cats in the process. Sylvester, still hoping to make Tweety his personal snack, is incensed at the thought of some other cat minions getting the little bird first. He vows to follow Tweety around the world and catch the canary himself; unbeknownst to either one, a thief is also present.

Tweety sets a course to Paris, but is blown by a strong wind to the Swiss Alps, where he gets trapped, as does Daffy Duck, but Bugs Bunny saves them both. He goes back to Paris, this time successfully and outsmarts Penelope Pussycat, where he causes Pepé Le Pew to mistake Sylvester for a female skunk. Tweety continues on to Venice, but grows overweight after eating too much bird seed. On a longboat, he faces a lot of cats, but he overpowers them and goes back to his normal size. While attempting to sleep in Egypt, he is chased into a tomb by Sylvester and his minions, but he escapes. Sylvester disguises himself as a dancing woman in a basket and takes it off as he catches Tweety, but when he sees hieroglyphics, Sylvester thinks he just sees images. A mummy cat army beats Sylvester as Tweety resumes to his escape. In the African jungle, he outsmarts Pete Puma and a lion with help from the Minah Bird.

In Tibet, he befriends another canary known as Aoogah (the name coming from her ability to imitate a horn), after rescuing her from a sacrifice using Hugo the Abominable Snowman. They are taken by more winds into Mexico, Brazil, Argentina and Japan, and eventually make it onto a boat to the United States. However, Sylvester catches up with them, but Hubie and Bertie cause him to slide into the water. Tweety and Aoogah are able to save him, but end up on a beach in Australia. Sylvester meets Taz and they team up and chase the two canaries, resorting to a motorcycle, but end up in the ocean with Taz holding the sign from Wile E. Coyote.

Tweety and Aoogah ride a windsurfer to San Francisco. Sylvester hijacks a tram to chase them, but ends up on Alcatraz, to the fury of Yosemite Sam, who appears as the tram's driver. The two canaries make it safely on a train to Las Vegas, where they escape more cats. Afterwards, they go through more cities across the United States, finishing in New York City. There, they trick Sylvester into getting onto a Concorde alone. The two canaries are caught up in an Atlantic hurricane and briefly washed up on an island, but outsmart more cats and escape back through the hurricane.

In a pub in the English countryside, they discover the thief and manage to outsmart him. Sylvester attempts to frame Tweety by passing his license to fly for a stolen passport. He almost succeeds, but the real passport is in his hand, thus getting himself arrested instead to frame Tweety and himself. Tweety and Aoogah believe they are a day late, but discover that it is the 21st of December because they crossed the international date line. They are able to get back to London, only to find that they managed to get just 79 pawprints. Tweety then realizes he forgot Sylvester so he flies into the prison truck taking him away and is able to get his pawprint, thereby saving the park. Tweety gets happily knighted by the Queen for helping find the missing royal passport and Sylvester goes to prison.

== Voice cast ==
- Joe Alaskey as Tweety, Sylvester the Cat, Bugs Bunny, Daffy Duck, Marvin the Martian, Colonel Rimfire, Henery Hawk, Pepé Le Pew, Clarence Cat and Train Conductor
- T'Keyah Crystal Keymah (uncredited) as Aoogah
- Jeff Bennett as Foghorn Leghorn, Bertie, Man #2 (singing voice), Man #3, Spokes Cat, Bike Vendor, Casino Cat #2 and Paperboy
- Jim Cummings as Rocky, Taz, Yosemite Sam, Cool Cat, Hubie, Man #2, Shropshire Slasher, Male Cat and Police Officer
- June Foray as Granny
- Stan Freberg as Pete Puma
- Tress MacNeille as Airplane Worker #2, Prissy, Queen Elizabeth II, Little Girl and Old Lady Cat
- Pat Musick as Little Boy and Airplane Worker #1
- Rob Paulsen as Sphinx, Man #1 (singing voice), Man #3 (singing voice), Chinese Man, Ship Crewman, Casino Cat #1 and Constable
- Frank Welker as Hector the Bulldog, Hugo the Abominable Snowman, Mugsy, Tweety (chirping noises), Man #1, Penelope Pussycat, Charlie Dog, Lion, Aoogah (chirping noises), Butler and Island Cats

== Music ==
Four original songs were composed for the film alongside various national anthems and folk songs. The cast of the film doubles as the chorus.

All lyrics are written by Randy Rogel; all music is composed by J. Eric Schmidt.

No.	Title	Performer(s)	Length
1.	"Around The World in 80 Puddytats"	Joe Alaskey, June Foray & Chorus
2.	"Tweety Don't Stand A Chance"	Joe Alaskey, Jeff Bennett & Chorus
3.	"We Got The Beat"	The Go-Go's
4.	"The Best Thing You Can Win is a Friend"	Joe Alaskey

== Video game ==
A video game adaptation of Tweety's High Flying Adventure was released by Kemco in 2000 for the Game Boy Color to positive reviews.

== Legacy ==
Aoogah, the original character of the film, returned in the 2022 direct-to-video film King Tweety, as the queen of an island paradise.
