= Looney Tunes Dash =

2014 video game

Looney Tunes Dash!
- Developers: Zynga; Eat Sleep Play
- Publisher: Zynga
- Platforms: iOS, Android
- Release: iOS: WW: December 17, 2014; Android: WW: April 24, 2015
- Genre: Endless runner
- Mode: Single-player

Looney Tunes Dash! was an endless running video game developed and published by Zynga and Eat Sleep Play. The game was released for iOS devices on December 17, 2014, and Android on April 24, 2015.

== Gameplay ==
The gameplay is an endless running platform game featuring Looney Tunes characters. Playable characters include Bugs Bunny (chased by Elmer Fudd), Daffy Duck (chased by Yosemite Sam), the Road Runner (chased by Wile E. Coyote), Tweety Bird (chased by Sylvester the Cat), the Tasmanian Devil (chased by the Tasmanian She-Devil), and Speedy Gonzales (chased by Sylvester). The player can swipe the touchscreen to move the characters left or right and make them jump and slide. They can also collect coins, "Collector's Cards" and power-ups (including one that turns the character into Gossamer) and activate the characters' "Special Abilities" to fly over or smash through obstacles and hazards. The game contains 60 episodes and 900 levels, each styled after a different cartoon theme.

== Development ==
Looney Tunes Dash! was developed by Zynga and Eat Sleep Play, (Note: Artists and designers working on the game included Christopher Diller, Matt Wood, Miles Collins, Shylow Barker, Jacob English, Erica Larson, Stephen Khan Ervin, Renjit M., and Luiz Bruno.) under the oversight of John vanSuchtelen, with Michael Waite as the creative director.

The music was composed by Clint Bajakian and Jeremy Garren (who also did the sound design) at Pyramind Studios, as a homage to Carl W. Stalling's soundtrack from the classic cartoons. Casting was done by Mike Forst, with voices provided by Jeff Bergman, Bob Bergen, Eric Bauza, Jim Cummings, and Lauri Fraser.

== Shutdown ==
Looney Tunes Dash! was shut down on January 27, 2018. If the game was downloaded before the shutdown, the main menu is still accessible, but the levels are not.

== See also ==
- List of Looney Tunes video games
