= Irv Wyner =

- Born: September 4, 1904
- Died: November 8, 2002 (aged 98); Los Angeles, California, U.S.
- Occupations: Artist, production designer
- Years active: 1951–2002

Irv Wyner (September 4, 1904 – November 8, 2002) was a background artist who was most associated with the theatrical Looney Tunes animated shorts, in Friz Freleng's unit.

Wyner's first credited work was on the 1952 animated short Gift Wrapped, a Sylvester and Tweety cartoon, and he stayed with Freleng's unit until 1957 (where his last credited work was on the one-shot cartoon Three Little Bops), when he was briefly succeeded by Boris Gorelick, and later by Tom O'Loughlin.

In the early 1960s, Irv did work for Disney on Disneyland, Walter Lantz, and later, in the 1970s, for Chuck Jones's Sib Tower 12 for such specials as The Phantom Tollbooth, Horton Hears a Who!, and Rikki-Tikki-Tavi, among others. He was production designer on A Connecticut Rabbit in King Arthur's Court (1978).

Wyner also painted and exhibited watercolors. He died in 2002, at the age of 98, in Los Angeles.
