= Trick or Tweet =

- Directed by: Friz Freleng
- Story by: Warren Foster
- Produced by: William Orcutt; David H. DePatie
- Starring: Mel Blanc (all other voices); Daws Butler (Sam)
- Edited by: Treg Brown
- Music by: Milt Franklyn
- Animation by: Arthur Davis; Virgil Ross; Gerry Chiniquy
- Layouts by: Hawley Pratt
- Backgrounds by: Tom O'Loughlin
- Color process: Technicolor
- Production company: Warner Bros. Cartoons
- Distributed by: Warner Bros. Pictures; The Vitaphone Corporation
- Release date: March 21, 1959 (US)
- Running time: 7 minutes
- Language: English

Trick or Tweet is a 1959 Warner Bros. Merrie Melodies animated cartoon directed by Friz Freleng. The short was released on March 21, 1959, and stars Tweety and Sylvester.

Tweety and Sylvester are voiced by Mel Blanc, and Sam, the orange-red cat acting as Sylvester's rival, is performed by an uncredited Daws Butler, doing a voice reminiscent of Frank Fontaine's "John L.C. Sivoney" from The Jack Benny Program and "Crazy Guggenheim" from The Jackie Gleason Show.

The title is a play on the phrase "Trick or treat".

== Plot ==
As Tweety is sweeping the dust around his nest high atop a wooden pole, Sylvester and Sam both tiptoe up to the pole to sneak up on him. Neither cat sees the other as they both climb the pole to the nest. Sylvester peers over Tweety's nest as Tweety sweeps the dust in Sylvester's face, prompting Tweety to remark, "Ooooh! I tawt I taw a puddytat!" Ditto with Sam, and Tweety says, "I tawt I taw anudda puddytat!" Both cats grab the nest simultaneously and rush down the pole. A tussle ensues with the two felines attempting to knock each other out and playing tug-of-war until Sylvester calls time out, convincing Sam that Tweety is too small to fight over. After debating which one should put Tweety back up on the pole, they agree to put him back there together, which they do. However, it immediately becomes apparent that they still do not trust each other, as they get into a prolonged goodbye and just stand and stare at each other before finally walking away.

Sylvester then sneaks up on Tweety hiding under a garbage can, but Sam has the same idea and beats him to the bird, and after both come down from the pole, Sylvester pounds Sam's can with a mallet. Sam, embarrassed at being caught in the act, tries to save face by explaining that he was "just seeing if he was OK, y'know". Sylvester yells "Put it back!" and Sam does so, retorting that to not do so would be "unethical".

Tweety then nails a stretch of barbed wire around the pole (because "I just don't twust puddytats' honor"). Sam, catnapping in his box, then hears Sylvester shouting "Ow! Ooh! Ow!" and stomps over to the pole as Sylvester picks up his torn fur. Seeing Sam's dirty look, Sylvester exclaims, "Aaaaaaaah, shaddap!"

As Sylvester, patched up with tape, is resting in his box, he hears a loud "Boing...boing...boing". Surely enough, it's Sam, bouncing on a trampoline in another effort to catch Tweety. Sylvester cuts the trampoline with a pair of scissors and Sam hits the ground with a loud thud, nearly knocking Tweety off his perch. There is a continuity error in that the barbed wire in this and subsequent scenes no longer appears near the top of the pole, but only near the base; the portion just under Tweety's nest is bare of wire.

Sam then sneaks out again and looks in Sylvester's window to find him gone, then looks up to discover Sylvester walking on the wire overhead with an umbrella. Sam cuts the wire with a pair of scissors, sending Sylvester crashing through two windows in a building nearby. Sylvester then closes his now bare-wire umbrella as he descends to the ground, and Sam giggles gleefully.

Next, Sylvester dons a Batman costume and soars through the air in an attempt to swoop in on Tweety, but again Sam has thought along the same lines. The two bang heads in mid-air and both plummet back to earth, landing in the garbage dump.

Sylvester paces the floor trying to think of what to do next, then peeks out the door to see Sam tiptoeing his way over. Sylvester places a coonskin cap in his box and covers it with a blanket, and when Sam sees it he "knocks him out" with a club. Sam then sneaks over to the pole, not realizing that Sylvester is following right behind him. Sam has a balloon on a string held down by a rock already set. He ties the string around his waist (and Sylvester's), pushes the rock away to release the balloon, and grabs Tweety on the way up, but Sylvester slaps his paw, and again Sam hands him the "just seeing if he was OK" alibi as the two continue to float upward. Sylvester then stabs the balloon with a pin (so that Sam can't try it again) and the two plunge back to the ground together in a deadly drop, which nearly caused Tweety to almost fall off his nest again. After Tweety hoists himself back up, he responds, "Y'know, I never weawized just being a wittle bird could be so compwicated."

== Home media ==
This short is available on disc 1 of the Looney Tunes Collector's Vault: Volume 3 Blu-ray set.

== Notes ==
- According to the book, I Tawt I Taw A Puddy Tat: Fifty Years of Sylvester and Tweety, Sam is the same cat who appeared in Putty Tat Trouble and Tweet and Sour, as his design from those two shorts are in early storyboards for this one. Sam would later appear again with Sylvester in the Academy Award-nominated short, Mouse and Garden released in 1960.
