= Tweety =

Warner Bros. theatrical cartoon character

- Looney Tunes/Merrie Melodies character
- Tweety in the Friz Freleng design. This is also his current appearance.
- First appearance: A Tale of Two Kitties (November 21, 1942; 83 years ago) (as Orson); Birdy and the Beast (August 19, 1944; 82 years ago) (as Tweety)
- Created by: Bob Clampett
- Designed by: Rod Scribner (1942); Thomas McKimson (1944–1945); Friz Freleng (1947–present)
- Voiced by: Mel Blanc (1942–1989); Jeff Bergman (1990–1993, 2004, 2011–2020); Bob Bergen (1990–2021); Greg Burson (1994, 1997–1998); Joe Alaskey (1995–2011); Eric Goldberg (1996, 2003); Sam Vincent (Baby Looney Tunes; 2002–2005); Billy West (2003–2004); Eric Bauza (2018–2026); (see below)
- Developed by: Friz Freleng; Warren Foster; Tedd Pierce; Michael Maltese

In-universe information
- Aliases: Tweety Bird; Tweety Pie
- Species: Domestic canary Generic bird (originally)
- Gender: Male
- Significant other: Aoogah
- Relatives: Tweetums (Loonatics Unleashed)
- Nationality: American
- Eyes: Blue

Tweety is a cartoon character, a yellow canary bird in the Warner Bros. Looney Tunes and Merrie Melodies series of animated cartoons. His characteristics are based on Red Skelton's famous "Junior the Mean Widdle Kid". He appeared in 46 cartoons during the golden age, made between 1942 and 1964.

== Personality and identity ==
Despite the perceptions that people may hold, owing to the long eyelashes and high-pitched voice (which Mel Blanc provided), Tweety is male. For example, in the cartoon Snow Business, when Granny entered a room containing Tweety and Sylvester she said: "Here I am, boys!". Another confirmation that Tweety is male comes from the cartoon Greedy for Tweety in which during a hospital stay, Granny (portrayed as a nurse) utters "Oh the poor little Tweety bird, let's makes him a little more comfortable", as she adjusts his bed. Nonetheless, a 1952 cartoon was entitled Ain't She Tweet.

Tweety's species has been ambiguous across various depictions; although originally and often portrayed as a young canary, he is also frequently called a rare and valuable "tweety bird" as a plot device, and once called "the only living specimen". Nevertheless, the title song of The Sylvester & Tweety Mysteries directly states that he is a canary. His shape more closely suggests that of a baby bird, which is what he was during his early appearances (although the "baby bird" aspect has been used in a few later cartoons as a plot device). The yellow feathers were added, but otherwise he retained the baby-bird shape.

In his early appearances in Bob Clampett's cartoons, Tweety is a highly sadistic and malicious individual who effortlessly thwarts cats' efforts in catching him with a variety of equipment and logical fallacies purely for his own amusement. In A Tale Of Two Kitties, Tweety instigates an air raid on Babbit and Catstello for trying to abduct him at night by air after Catstello was grievously injured throughout the film. In Birdy and the Beast, Tweety tricks the cat into grabbing a grenade, killing the cat in the explosion and revealing that he is a serial killer of cats who similarly tried to attack him.

Tweety's aggressive nature was also initially characterized by Friz Freleng when he began directing the series, but would later be toned-down to instead have him be portrayed as a cutesy bird usually going about his business, and doing little to thwart Sylvester's ill-conceived plots, allowing them to simply collapse on their own; he became even less aggressive when Granny was introduced, but occasionally Tweety still showed a malicious side when egged on. Despite this, in comparison with other major Looney Tunes protagonists such as Bugs Bunny and Foghorn Leghorn, Tweety was not given a complete character arc, instead embodying the "innocent child" role offsetting the motives of his superior Sylvester and their guardian figure.

== Creation by Bob Clampett ==
Tweety's preliminary debut (as Orson) in A Tale of Two Kitties (1942)

Bob Clampett created the character that would become Tweety in the 1942 short A Tale of Two Kitties, pitting him against two hungry cats named Babbit and Catstello (based on the famous comedians Abbott and Costello). On the original model sheet, Tweety was named Orson, which was also the name of a bird character from an earlier Clampett cartoon Wacky Blackout.

Tweety was originally created not as a domestic canary, but as a generic (and wild) baby bird in an outdoor nest: naked (pink), jowly, and also far more aggressive and saucy, as opposed to the later, better-known version of him as a less hot-tempered (but still somewhat ornery) yellow canary. In the documentary Bugs Bunny: Superstar, animator Clampett stated that Tweety had been based "on my own naked baby picture." Clampett did two more shorts with the "naked genius", as a Jimmy Durante-ish cat once called him in A Gruesome Twosome. The second Tweety short, Birdy and the Beast, finally bestowed the baby bird with his new name, and gave him his blue eyes. After the first three cartoons, censors declared that the character was nude, and they made the studio paint him yellow to make it look as if he was covered in feathers. The change made Tweety look like a regular yellow domestic canary.

Many of Mel Blanc's characters are known for speech impediments. One of Tweety's most noticeable is that /s/, /k/, and /g/ are changed to /t/, /d/, or (final s) /θ/; for example, "pussy cat" comes out as "putty tat", later rendered "puddy tat", "Granny" comes out as "Dwanny" and "sweetie pie" comes out as "tweetie pie" (a phonological pattern referred to as 'fronting'), hence his name. He also has trouble with liquid consonants: as with Elmer Fudd, /l/ and /r/ come out as /w/. Some of his cartoons feature him singing a song about himself, "I'm a tweet wittow biwd in a diwded tage; Tweety'th my name but I don't know my age, I don't have to wuwy and dat is dat; I'm tafe in hewe fwom dat ol' putty tat". (Translation: "I'm a sweet little bird in a gilded cage; Tweety’s my name but I don’t know my age, I don’t have to worry and that is that; I’m safe in here from that old pussy cat") Aside from this speech impediment, Tweety's voice is that of Bugs Bunny, one speed up (if The Old Grey Hare, which depicts Bugs as an infant, is any indication of that); the only difference is that Bugs does not have trouble pronouncing /s/, /k/ and /g/ as mentioned above.

== Freleng takes over ==
Clampett began work on a short that would pit Tweety against a then-unnamed, lisping black and white cat created by Friz Freleng in 1946. However, Clampett left the studio before going into full production on the short (which had a storyboard produced, where it was titled "Fat Rat and the Stupid Cat"), however Freleng would use Tweety in his own separate project. Freleng toned Tweety down and gave him a cuter appearance, resulting in his long-lashed blue-pupil eyes and yellow feathers. Clampett mentions in Bugs Bunny: Superstar that the feathers were added to satisfy censors who objected to the naked bird. The first short to team Tweety and the cat, later named Sylvester, was 1947's Tweetie Pie, which won Warner Bros. its first Academy Award for Best Short Subject.

Sylvester and Tweety proved to be one of the most notable pairings in animation history. Most of their cartoons followed a standard formula:

- Sylvester wants to catch and eat Tweety, but some major obstacle stands in his way – usually Granny or her bulldog Hector (or occasionally, numerous bulldogs, or another cat who also wants to catch and eat Tweety).
- Tweety says his signature lines "I tawt I taw a puddy tat!" and "I did! I did taw a puddy tat!" (Originally, like in A Tale of Two Kitties, it was "I did! I taw a putty tat!", but the extra "did" got inserted, starting with Freleng's first cartoon, somehow). In later cartoons, such as Home, Tweet Home, Tweety says "I did! I did! I did taw a puddy tat!"
- Sylvester spends the entire film using progressively more elaborate schemes or devices to catch Tweety, similar to Wile E. Coyote in his ongoing efforts to catch the Road Runner, Tom's attempts to catch Jerry, and the Aardvark's attempts to catch the Ant. Of course, each of his tricks fail, either due to their flaws or, more often than not, because of intervention by either Hector the Bulldog or an indignant Granny, or after Tweety steers the enemy toward them or another device (such as off the ledge of a tall building or in front of an oncoming train).

In a few of the cartoons, Sylvester does manage to briefly eat Tweety up with a gulp. However, either Granny or another character makes him spit Tweety out right away. In the 1952 Christmas-themed short Gift Wrapped, Sylvester was also briefly eaten by Hector the Bulldog, and forced by Granny to spit him out; as punishment, both Sylvester and Hector were tied up with their mouths gagged shut.

In 1951, Mel Blanc (with Billy May's orchestra) had a hit single with "I Tawt I Taw a Puddy Tat", a song performed in character by Tweety and featuring Sylvester. In the lyrics Sylvester sings "I'd like to eat that Thweetie Pie when he leaves his cage", implying that Tweety's name is actually Sweetie Pie. Later the name "Sweetie Pie" was applied to the young, pink female canary in the Tiny Toon Adventures animated TV series of the early 1990s.

From 1945 until the original Warner Bros. Cartoons studio closed, Freleng had almost exclusive use of Tweety at the Warner cartoon studio (much like Yosemite Sam), with the exception of a brief cameo in No Barking in 1954, directed by Chuck Jones (that year, Freleng used Pepé Le Pew, a Jones character, for the only time in his career and the only time in a Tweety short, Dog Pounded).

== Later appearances ==
Tweety had a cameo role in the 1988 film Who Framed Roger Rabbit, making Eddie Valiant (Bob Hoskins) fall from a flag pole by playing "This Little Piggy" with Valiant's fingers and releasing his grip. The scene is essentially a re-creation of a gag from A Tale of Two Kitties, with Valiant replacing Catstello as Tweety's victim. He also appears near the end of the film alongside other animated characters. This was the last time Mel Blanc voiced Tweety.

During the 1990s, Tweety also starred in the animated TV series The Sylvester and Tweety Mysteries, in which Granny ran a detective agency with the assistance of Tweety, Sylvester and Hector. In the series, Tweety has the starring role and is voiced by Joe Alaskey. The storyline carries into the 2000 direct-to-video feature-length animated film Tweety's High-Flying Adventure, where Joe Alaskey reprises his role. Tweety's prototype, Orson, also made an appearance in the series.

Tweety also appears in Tiny Toon Adventures as the mentor of Sweetie Pie, and one of the faculty at Acme Looniversity. He was voiced by Jeff Bergman for most of his appearances and Bob Bergen in "Animaniacs".

In the 1995 cartoon short Carrotblanca, a parody/homage to Casablanca, Tweety appeared as "Usmarte", a parody of the character Ugarte played by Peter Lorre in the original film. In several sequences, Tweety was speaking and laughing in character like Peter Lorre. He also does the Looney Tunes ending instead of Porky Pig or Bugs Bunny. This is also notable for being a rare instance where Tweety plays a villain character. Bob Bergen voices the role again.

In 1996, Tweety (voiced by Bob Bergen again) appeared in the feature film, Space Jam, with legendary basketball player Michael Jordan.

In 2001, a younger version of Tweety appeared on Baby Looney Tunes, thus coming full circle from his earliest appearances. Here he was voiced by Sam Vincent.

In 2003, Tweety (voiced by Eric Goldberg) made two appearances in Looney Tunes: Back in Action, although in one of those appearances this "Tweety" was actually the Tasmanian Devil (Taz) in disguise.

In 2011, Tweety was featured, with his Looney Tunes co-stars, in Cartoon Network's series The Looney Tunes Show. He is voiced by Jeff Bergman. He appeared in the episode "Ridiculous Journey", where he and Sylvester work together with Taz to get back home to Granny and Bugs Bunny. He had been revealed to have fought in World War II alongside a young Granny. Sylvester also asked him how old he was, to which Tweety replied, "I'll never tell". Sylvester then asked if Tweety would at least tell him if he (Tweety) was a boy or a girl. Tweety whispered into his ear and Sylvester had a surprised expression and said "Huh, I was wrong".

Tweety appeared as a major character in New Looney Tunes and Looney Tunes Cartoons, where his designs were based on his Bob Clampett Cartoons while still maintaining his yellow feathers. His personality reverts him to being more violent and abusive in nature while being toned down to retain his cute facade. Bob Bergen voiced the character in New Looney Tunes, while Eric Bauza voiced him for the first time in Looney Tunes Cartoons.

On February 17, 2021, it was announced Tweety would star in Tweety Mysteries which would have been similar to The Sylvester & Tweety Mysteries. The series would have been a live-action/animated hybrid aimed towards girls and would have aired on Cartoon Network. However, the series never got off the ground as Cartoon Network announced all live-action productions were cancelled in December 2022.

Tweety's next appearance was in Space Jam: A New Legacy, which was released on July 16, 2021. He was voiced by Bob Bergen.

Tweety starred in a direct-to-video film King Tweety, which was released on June 14, 2022. He was voiced by Eric Bauza.

Tweety appears in the preschool series Bugs Bunny Builders, which aired as part of Cartoonito on Cartoon Network and HBO Max on July 25, 2022. In the series, similar to Baby Looney Tunes and the finale of The Sylvester and Tweety Mysteries, he is friends with Sylvester. Eric Bauza reprised his role from Looney Tunes Cartoons.

Tweety's most recent appearance was in Coyote vs. Acme. which was released on August 28, 2026. Here, Tweety becomes an informant and hitman for Buddy Crane during the titular case. This was the last time Tweety was voiced by Eric Bauza before his death in October 2026.

== Merchandise ==
Tweety and Sylvester have been used to endorse products such as Miracle Whip dressing and MCI Communications long distance. In 1998, the United States Post Office honored Tweety and Sylvester with a 32-cent postage stamp. Tweety also appears in products produced by Warner Brothers Studios.

== Modern art ==
British artist Banksy's 2008 New York art installation The Village Pet Store and Charcoal Grill features Tweety, an animatronic sculpture of an aged and molting version of the character. In honor of Tweety's 80th anniversary, Warner Bros. Discovery unveiled 80 themed murals done by artists from around the world.

== Comic books ==
Western Publications produced a comic book about Tweety and Sylvester entitled Tweety and Sylvester, first in Dell Comics Four Color series #406, 489, and 524, then in their own title from Dell Comics (#4–37, 1954–1962), then later from Gold Key Comics (#1–102, 1963–1972).

In 2017, Tweety appeared in the DC Comics special, Catwoman/ Tweety and Sylvester, where Tweety teams up with Black Canary, who he calls "bwonde wady".

== Filmography ==
=== Golden Age appearances ===
#	Title	Release date	Director	DVD & Blu-Ray Availability	Notes
1	A Tale of Two Kitties	November 21, 1942	Bob Clampett	DVD: Golden Collection: Vol. 5; Blu-Ray/DVD: Platinum Collection: Vol. 1	Public Domain
2	Birdy and the Beast	August 19, 1944	Bob Clampett	Blu-Ray/DVD: Platinum Collection: Vol. 2	
3	A Gruesome Twosome	June 9, 1945	Bob Clampett	DVD: Golden Collection: Vol. 3; Blu-Ray/DVD: Platinum Collection: Vol. 3	
-	Baby Bottleneck	March 16, 1946	Bob Clampett	DVD: Golden Collection: Vol. 2; Blu-Ray/DVD: Platinum Collection: Vol. 1	Cameo appearance
4	Tweetie Pie	May 3, 1947	Friz Freleng	DVD: Golden Collection: Vol. 2; DVD: Academy Awards Animation Collection; Blu-Ray/DVD: Platinum Collection: Vol. 1	
5	I Taw a Putty Tat	April 3, 1948	Friz Freleng	DVD: Golden Collection: Vol. 4 (extra, unrestored); Blu-Ray: Collector's Vault: Vol. 2 (restored)	
6	Bad Ol' Putty Tat	July 23, 1949	Friz Freleng	DVD: Golden Collection: Vol. 2; DVD: Super Stars' Tweety & Sylvester	
7	Home Tweet Home	January 14, 1950	Friz Freleng	Blu-Ray/DVD: Platinum Collection: Vol. 2	
8	All a Bir-r-r-d	June 24, 1950	Friz Freleng	DVD: Golden Collection: Vol. 2; DVD: Super Stars' Tweety & Sylvester	
9	Canary Row	October 7, 1950	Friz Freleng	DVD: Golden Collection: Vol. 1; DVD: Super Stars' Tweety & Sylvester; Blu-Ray/DVD: Platinum Collection: Vol. 3	
10	Putty Tat Trouble	February 24, 1951	Friz Freleng	DVD: Golden Collection: Vol. 1; DVD: Super Stars' Tweety & Sylvester	
11	Room and Bird	June 2, 1951	Friz Freleng	DVD: Golden Collection: Vol. 2; DVD: Super Stars' Tweety & Sylvester	
12	Tweety's S.O.S.	September 22, 1951	Friz Freleng	DVD: Golden Collection: Vol. 1; DVD: Super Stars' Tweety & Sylvester	
13	Tweet Tweet Tweety	December 15, 1951	Friz Freleng	DVD: Golden Collection: Vol. 2; DVD: Super Stars' Tweety & Sylvester	
14	Gift Wrapped	February 16, 1952	Friz Freleng	DVD: Golden Collection: Vol. 2; DVD: Super Stars' Tweety & Sylvester; Blu-Ray/DVD: Platinum Collection: Vol. 2	
15	Ain't She Tweet	June 21, 1952	Friz Freleng	DVD: Golden Collection: Vol. 2; DVD: Super Stars' Tweety & Sylvester; Blu-Ray: Collector's Vault: Vol. 1	
16	A Bird in a Guilty Cage	August 30, 1952	Friz Freleng	DVD: Golden Collection: Vol. 2; Blu-Ray: Collector's Vault: Vol. 2	
17	Snow Business	January 17, 1953	Friz Freleng	DVD: Golden Collection: Vol. 2; DVD: Super Stars' Tweety & Sylvester; Blu-Ray: Collector's Vault: Vol. 1	
18	Fowl Weather	April 4, 1953	Friz Freleng	Blu-Ray: Collector's Vault: Vol. 2	
19	Tom Tom Tomcat	June 27, 1953	Friz Freleng		
20	A Street Cat Named Sylvester	September 5, 1953	Friz Freleng	Blu-Ray: Collector's Vault: Vol. 2	
21	Catty Cornered	October 31, 1953	Friz Freleng	Blu-Ray: Collector's Choice: Vol. 2	
22	Dog Pounded	January 2, 1954	Friz Freleng	DVD: Super Stars' Pepe Le Pew; Blu-Ray/DVD: Platinum Collection: Vol. 3	
-	No Barking	February 27, 1954	Chuck Jones	DVD: Golden Collection: Vol. 3	Cameo appearance
23	Muzzle Tough	June 26, 1954	Friz Freleng	Blu-Ray: Collector's Choice: Vol. 4	
24	Satan's Waitin'	August 7, 1954	Friz Freleng	DVD: Golden Collection: Vol. 6; DVD: Super Stars' Tweety & Sylvester; Blu-Ray/DVD: Platinum Collection: Vol. 3	
25	Sandy Claws	April 2, 1955	Friz Freleng	DVD: Academy Awards Animation Collection; Blu-Ray/DVD: Platinum Collection: Vol. 3	
26	Tweety's Circus	June 4, 1955	Friz Freleng	Blu-Ray: Collector's Vault: Vol. 1	
27	Red Riding Hoodwinked	October 29, 1955	Friz Freleng	DVD: Golden Collection: Vol. 5; Blu-Ray: Collector's Vault: Vol. 1	
-	Heir-Conditioned	November 26, 1955	Friz Freleng	DVD: Golden Collection: Vol. 6	Cameo appearance
28	Tweet and Sour	March 24, 1956	Friz Freleng	Blu-Ray: Collector's Vault: Vol. 3	
29	Tree Cornered Tweety	May 19, 1956	Friz Freleng	Blu-Ray: Collector's Vault: Vol. 3	
30	Tugboat Granny	June 23, 1956	Friz Freleng	Blu-Ray: Collector's Choice: Vol. 3	
31	Tweet Zoo	January 12, 1957	Friz Freleng		
32	Tweety and the Beanstalk	March 16, 1957	Friz Freleng	DVD: Golden Collection: Vol. 5; DVD: Super Stars' Tweety & Sylvester	
33	Birds Anonymous	August 10, 1957	Friz Freleng	DVD: Golden Collection: Vol. 5; DVD: Academy Awards Animation Collection; DVD: Super Stars' Tweety & Sylvester; Blu-Ray/DVD: Platinum Collection: Vol. 3	
34	Greedy for Tweety	September 28, 1957	Friz Freleng	Blu-Ray: Collector's Choice: Vol. 1	
35	A Pizza Tweety Pie	February 22, 1958	Friz Freleng	Blu-Ray: Collector's Vault: Vol. 3	
36	A Bird in a Bonnet	September 27, 1958	Friz Freleng		
37	Trick or Tweet	March 21, 1959	Friz Freleng	Blu-Ray: Collector's Vault: Vol. 3	
38	Tweet and Lovely	July 18, 1959	Friz Freleng	Blu-Ray: Collector's Vault: Vol. 1	
39	Tweet Dreams	December 5, 1959	Friz Freleng		
40	Hyde and Go Tweet	May 14, 1960	Friz Freleng	Blu-Ray: Collector's Choice: Vol. 4	
41	Trip For Tat	October 29, 1960	Friz Freleng		
42	The Rebel Without Claws	July 15, 1961	Friz Freleng	Blu-Ray: Collector's Choice: Vol. 2	
43	The Last Hungry Cat	December 2, 1961	Friz Freleng; Hawley Pratt	DVD: Golden Collection: Vol. 3; DVD: Super Stars' Tweety & Sylvester; Blu-Ray: Collector's Vault: Vol. 2	
44	The Jet Cage	September 22, 1962	Friz Freleng; Hawley Pratt		
45	Hawaiian Aye Aye	June 27, 1964	Gerry Chiniquy		

=== Post-Golden Age appearances ===
- Bugs Bunny's Looney Christmas Tales (1979), voiced by Mel Blanc
- Who Framed Roger Rabbit (1988), voiced by Mel Blanc
- Tiny Toon Adventures (1990), voiced by Jeff Bergman and Bob Bergen
- Carrotblanca (1995), voiced by Bob Bergen
- The Sylvester and Tweety Mysteries (1995), voiced by Joe Alaskey
- Superior Duck (1996), voiced by Eric Goldberg (cameo appearance)
- Space Jam (1996), voiced by Bob Bergen
- Tweety's High-Flying Adventure (2000), voiced by Joe Alaskey
- Baby Looney Tunes (2001), voiced by Samuel Vincent
- Looney Tunes: Back in Action (2003), voiced by Eric Goldberg
- Museum Scream (2004), voiced by Billy West
- Bah, Humduck! A Looney Tunes Christmas (2006), voiced by Bob Bergen
- The Looney Tunes Show (2011), voiced by Jeff Bergman
- I Tawt I Taw a Puddy Tat (2011), voiced by Mel Blanc (Archive Audio)
- New Looney Tunes (2015), voiced by Bob Bergen
- Looney Tunes Cartoons (2020), voiced by Eric Bauza
- Space Jam: A New Legacy (2021), voiced by Bob Bergen
- King Tweety (2022), voiced by Eric Bauza
- Bugs Bunny Builders (2022), voiced by Eric Bauza
- Coyote vs. Acme (2026), voiced by Eric Bauza

== Voice actors ==
Voice artist Mel Blanc originated the character's voice. After the Golden Age of American Animation came to an end, Blanc continued to voice the character in TV specials, commercials, music recordings, and films, such as 1988's Who Framed Roger Rabbit, which was one of Blanc's final projects as Tweety. Before and after Blanc's death in 1989, several voice actors have provided the voice in his stead. These voice actors are:

- Danny Kaye (1951 I Taut I Taw a Puddy-Tat cover)
- Gilbert Mack (Golden Records records, Bugs Bunny Songfest)
- Malcolm McNeill (Spin a Magic Tune)
- Jeff Bergman (The Earth Day Special, Tiny Toon Adventures, Tyson Foods commercial, Cartoon Network bumpers, Boomerang bumper, The Looney Tunes Show, Looney Tunes Dash, Daffy Duck Dance Off, Ani-Mayhem, Little Red Tweety Hood)
- Noel Blanc (You Rang? answering machine messages, 2001 Chevrolet Monte Carlo 400)
- Bob Bergen (Tiny Toon Adventures, Bugs Bunny's Birthday Ball, Looney Tunes River Ride, Yosemite Sam and the Gold River Adventure!, Tweety's Global Patrol PSA, Tweety's Global Patrol live show, Bugs Bunny Goin' Hollywood, Sylvester and Tweety in Cagey Capers, Have Yourself a Looney Tunes Christmas, Carrotblanca read-along, Carrotblanca short, Space Jam, The Looney West, Space Jam pinball game, Bugs Bunny's Learning Adventures, Looney Tunes: Back in Action (video game), Bah, Humduck! A Looney Tunes Christmas, A Looney Tunes Sing-A-Long Christmas, Looney Tunes: Cartoon Conductor, Looney Tunes: Laff Riot pilot, New Looney Tunes, Looney Tunes: World of Mayhem, Space Jam: A New Legacy, various commercials)
- Keith Scott (Looney Tunes Musical Revue, The Christmas Looney Tunes Classic Collection, Westfield commercial, HBF Insurance commercial, Spectacular Light and Sound Show Illuminanza, KFC commercials, Looney Tunes: We Got the Beat!, Looney Tunes on Ice, Looney Tunes LIVE! Classroom Capers, Christmas Moments with Looney Tunes, The Looney Tunes Radio Show, Looney Rock, Looney Tunes Christmas Carols, 2023 Australian Open)
- Greg Burson (Animaniacs, Warner Bros. Kids Club, Bugs Bunny’s Elephant Parade, Quest for Camelot promotion)
- Joe Alaskey (The Sylvester & Tweety Mysteries, Bugs & Friends Sing Elvis, Warner Bros. Sing-Along: Quest for Camelot, Warner Bros. Sing-Along: Looney Tunes, Crash! Bang! Boom! The Best of WB Sound FX, Tweety's High-Flying Adventure, The Looney Tunes Kwazy Christmas, Looney Tunes Dance Off, Looney Tunes ClickN READ Phonics, various video games, webtoons, and commercials)
- Frank Welker (chirping sounds in The Sylvester & Tweety Mysteries and Tweety's High-Flying Adventure)
- Eric Goldberg (Superior Duck, Looney Tunes: Back in Action)
- Samuel Vincent (Baby Looney Tunes, Baby Looney Tunes: Egg-straordinary Adventure)
- Tom Kenny (Twick or Tweety (as Vampire Tweety))
- Billy West (Museum Scream)
- Kevin Shinick (Mad)
- Patrick Warburton (Family Guy)
- Seth Green (Robot Chicken)
- Dee Bradley Baker (New Looney Tunes (monster form))
- Eric Bauza (Looney Tunes: World of Mayhem (monster form), Looney Tunes Cartoons, Bugs Bunny in The Golden Carrot, King Tweety, Bugs Bunny Builders, ACME Fools, Warner Bros. World Abu Dhabi commercial, Lights, Camera, Action: A WB100th Anniversary Celebration, Looney Tunes: Wacky World of Sports, Tiny Toons Looniversity, Coyote vs. Acme)
- Tom Sheppard (Robot Chicken)
