= Tweet Tweet Tweety =

- Title card
- Directed by: I. Freleng
- Story by: Warren Foster
- Starring: Mel Blanc
- Music by: Carl Stalling
- Animation by: Ken Champin; Arthur Davis; Manuel Perez; Virgil Ross; Harry Love
- Layouts by: Hawley Pratt
- Backgrounds by: Paul Julian
- Color process: Technicolor
- Production company: Warner Bros. Cartoons
- Distributed by: Warner Bros. Pictures; The Vitaphone Corporation
- Release date: December 15, 1951 (US)
- Running time: 7:03
- Language: English

Tweet Tweet Tweety is a 1951 Warner Bros. Looney Tunes animated short directed by Friz Freleng. The short was released on December 15, 1951, and stars Tweety and Sylvester.

== Plot ==
Sylvester is in Yellowstone National Park and, hearing birds chirping, climbs up the tree to Tweety's nest, despite the ranger's warnings. Unfortunately, he hasn't hatched, so Sylvester must wait him out. Once Tweety does hatch, he decides to poke the cat in the butt with a pin needle, to get him off. Sylvester then gives chase, with Tweety hiding in a hole in the tree; the cat forces him out with an air pump, but Tweety sends up a stick of dynamite instead. The chase then continues to another tree, with Tweety sawing the branch Sylvester is on.

Some time later, Tweety is singing about what Sylvester would want with him, while Sylvester sits below, scarred and bruised from attempting to scale the tree while it's covered in barbed wire. Irritated and annoyed, Sylvester hacks the tree down, only to have it fall on himself.

Sylvester then tries to use a swing in order to reach Tweety on a branch, only to swing into a construction mallet which flattens him.

Later, people are taking pictures of Tweety, who is perched on a tree stump. Sylvester, disguised as a cameraman, moves up close to Tweety, pops his head through the camera lens and eats him, only to spit him out thanks to the park ranger who catches him in the act, then bashes him in the head for violating the park's rule.

The next attempt involves Tweety hiding in Old Faithful's geyser, which would erupt exactly when the clock below turns to 12:00. He sets the clock to 12:30 and jumps in, while Tweety sets the clock back to 12:00, the time it erupts, forcing the cat upward.

Tweety then hops on a log and starts rowing down a river, with Sylvester close behind in a rowboat. However, there is a waterfall ahead; Tweety jumps off, but Sylvester does not, and he desperately tries to row upward once he realizes where he is. Tweety offers assistance by turning on the emergency control; this merely causes Sylvester, not yet in safe waters, to end up in midair. He waves goodbye and falls down, presumably to his doom. Tweety then comments that Sylvester is going to hurt himself if he is not more careful.
