= Granny (Looney Tunes) =

Warner Bros. fictional character

- Looney Tunes/Merrie Melodies character
- First appearance: Canary Row (October 7, 1950; 76 years ago)
- Created by: Friz Freleng
- Voiced by: Bea Benaderet (1950–1955); June Foray (1955–2013); Ge Ge Pearson (1965); Joan Gerber (1965); Mel Blanc (1974–1978); Linda Weinrib (briefly; talking toy); Tress MacNeille (1998; Bugs Bunny's Learning Adventures); Stephanie Courtney (2011; young, The Looney Tunes Show); Robyn Moore (2012, 2017; Warner Bros. Movie World live shows); Lauri Fraser (2014; Looney Tunes Dash); Candi Milo (2017–present); Eric Bauza (2018; Looney Tunes: World of Mayhem)

In-universe information
- Full name: Emma Webster
- Gender: Female
- Relatives: Floyd Minton (nephew)
- Nationality: American

Emma Webster, commonly referred to as Granny, is a fictional character created by Friz Freleng, best known from the Looney Tunes and Merrie Melodies animated short films of the 1950s and 1960s. She is the owner of Tweety, and more often than not, Sylvester and Hector. Her voice was first provided by Bea Benaderet from 1950 through 1955, then by June Foray for almost 60 years. Following Foray's death, Candi Milo took over in 2017.

== Biography ==
Granny is a good-natured widow who is extremely protective of her beloved bird, Tweety. Granny's overprotectiveness becomes apparent whenever Tweety is threatened, usually by her sometimes pet, Sylvester. Although having the appearance of a kind old woman, Granny has demonstrated her cleverness in many cartoons.

At least until the mid-1950s, Granny is depicted as an elderly spinster who wears spectacles, a gray bun, and a late 19th-century-like schoolmarm dress; other old-fashioned characteristics include her mode of transportation (usually a Ford Model T or a horse and buggy) and her inability to relate to present fads (such as her telling Tweety she is about to try on a new "bikini bathing suit", which turns out to be a full one-piece outfit from the turn of the 20th century). After 1955 — in particular, the years after Foray began voicing the character — the character's wardrobe was updated and her old-fashioned tastes and ways of life were de-emphasized, and she was sometimes given newer careers, such as a nurse or a bus driver.

== Appearances ==
The idea of the cartoon Granny began with the Little Red Riding Hood character in spoofs of the story, first appearing as such in the 1937 animated short Little Red Walking Hood, which also featured the first appearance of Elmer Fudd, directed by Tex Avery. Subsequent appearances of a similar "granny" character included The Cagey Canary (1941), directed by Avery and Bob Clampett; Hiss and Make Up (1943), directed by Friz Freleng; and Hare Force (1944), featuring Bugs Bunny and Sylvester the dog (a one-off character distinct from the later Sylvester the cat). Finally, the character was solidified into her current role in Canary Row in 1950, with Bea Benaderet providing her voice. June Foray, who had been providing Granny's voice for her appearances on Capitol Records since 1950, took over the role officially in 1955, and performed the role for most of the rest of the character's theatrical run. Granny continued to appear in several more animated shorts from the 1950s on, as a foil for Sylvester, who was always attempting to eat her pet bird Tweety.

Foray did not voice Granny for her last two theatrical shorts, possibly for budgetary reasons; Ge Ge Pearson and Joan Gerber each voiced the character in one short, both of which were released in 1965. Foray returned to the role in later television productions.

=== Solo ===
Although she was almost always shown on-screen with at least one of her two animal companions, Granny appeared in three animated shorts without them. In the 1953 short Hare Trimmed, she starred as a rich widow who was being fought over by two suitors, Yosemite Sam and Bugs Bunny (the latter out to thwart the former's evil plan to marry her and then get her money). Sam called her "Emma" and later "Emmy". Granny would later appear in the 1955 short This Is a Life?, where she hits Daffy Duck with her umbrella for interrupting the live program. Her last solo appearance was the 1965 short Corn on the Cop, where she appears alongside Daffy Duck and Porky Pig as two Keystone Cops who mistake her for a crook disguised like her. The short would also disclose Granny's surname as "Webster" by Daffy and Porky's superior officer.

=== Later appearances ===
Granny was going to have a cameo in the 1988 film Who Framed Roger Rabbit, but was later dropped for unknown reasons.

She has appeared as a professor at Acme Looniversity and the mentor and favorite teacher of Mary Melody in Tiny Toon Adventures (in the reboot series Tiny Toons Looniversity, she appears as the university's dean), a world-traveling detective in The Sylvester and Tweety Mysteries, and a timekeeper in Bugs Bunny and Taz Time Busters. Granny donned a cheerleader uniform for the Tune Squad in the 1996 film Space Jam. She was the children's grandmother and new character Floyd's aunt in Baby Looney Tunes, and made two cameo appearances in the 2003 film Looney Tunes: Back in Action as the main character's next-door neighbor, although in one of those appearances, this "Granny" was actually the Acme Chairman in disguise. She also appeared in Bah, Humduck! A Looney Tunes Christmas and in Tweety's High-Flying Adventure. Foray reprised her role in all of these appearances.

An episode of Loonatics Unleashed featured characters named Queen Grannicus (voiced by Candi Milo), the Royal Tweetums, and Sylth Vester (the latter being a parody of Darth Vader). However, another episode featured a cameo of Granny herself, apparently still alive in the year 2772.

In The Looney Tunes Show, Granny is one of Bugs and Daffy's neighbors and is again voiced by Foray, while her younger self is voiced by Stephanie Courtney, and Sylvester and Tweety are her pets. This version of Granny seems to be somewhat hard-of-hearing and slightly senile. A running gag is that Sylvester is constantly chasing Tweety around her house, to which Granny seems oblivious. "Eligible Bachelors" revealed that, during World War II, Granny/Emma was a member of the WAC, and along with Tweety she stopped Nazi Colonel Frankenheimer from stealing the Eiffel Tower and various paintings from the Louvre. During the flashback of her World War II adventure to Daffy, she appears as an attractive, red-headed young woman in a WAC uniform. In "The Grand Old Duck of York", Granny teaches piano lessons when Daffy wants to learn how to play the piano. This series marked the final time Foray voiced the character before her death in 2017.

Granny appears in New Looney Tunes voiced by Candi Milo, who has voiced the character in subsequent appearances.

Granny appears in the 2021 film Space Jam: A New Legacy voiced by Milo. After she and Speedy Gonzales were picked up from The Matrix part of the Warner Bros. 3000 server-verse, Granny became a member of the Tune Squad during their basketball match against the Goon Squad. In one scene, she defeats Chronos by activating the time-control device on his left shoulder to age him to 132 years. During the credits, a photograph shows Granny going up against Ronda Rousey.

Granny appears as a major character in the 2022 film King Tweety.

Granny appears in the 2026 film Coyote vs. Acme, voiced by Milo. In the film, she is given a named husband: she is a widow due to the disappearance of her husband Peter Lorre, who formerly worked for the Acme Corporation.
