= Sylvester the Cat =

Warner Bros. theatrical cartoon character

- Looney Tunes/Merrie Melodies character
- First appearance: Life with Feathers (March 24, 1945; 81 years ago)
- Created by: Friz Freleng
- Designed by: Hawley Pratt (1945–present); Dick Ung (1965–1966)
- Voiced by: Mel Blanc (1945–1989); Bill Farmer (1987, 1996); Jeff Bergman (1989–1993, 1997–1998, 2002–2004, 2007, 2011–present); Joe Alaskey (1990–2011); Greg Burson (1991, 1993, 1995, 1997); Terry Klassen (Baby Looney Tunes; 2002–2005); Jeff Bennett (2003, 2006); Eric Bauza (2018, 2021–2023, 2025) (see below)

In-universe information
- Full name: Sylvester James Pussycat
- Alias: Sylvester the Cat
- Species: Tuxedo cat
- Gender: Male
- Family: Unnamed mother Alan (brother)
- Significant other: Mrs. Cat
- Children: Sylvester Jr. (son)
- Relatives: Sylth Vester (descendant)
- Nationality: American

Sylvester J. Pussycat Sr. is a cartoon character, an anthropomorphic cat in the Looney Tunes and Merrie Melodies series of cartoons. Most of his appearances have him often chasing Tweety, Speedy Gonzales, or Hippety Hopper. He appeared in 103 cartoons in the golden age of American animation, lagging only behind superstars Bugs Bunny, Porky Pig, and Daffy Duck. Three of his cartoons won Academy Awards, the most for any starring a Looney Tunes character: they are Tweetie Pie, Speedy Gonzales, and Birds Anonymous.

== Animation history ==
=== Development ===
Before Sylvester's appearance in the cartoons, Mel Blanc voiced a character named Sylvester on The Judy Canova Show using the voice that would eventually become associated with the cat.

== Personality and catchphrases ==
Like Daffy Duck, Sylvester is known for having a sloppy lisp. To emphasize the lisp, as with Daffy's catchphrase "You're desthpicable", Sylvester's trademark exclamation is "Sufferin' succotash!", which is said to be a minced oath of "Suffering Savior". (Daffy also says "Sufferin' succotash!" on a few occasions.) A common gag used for both Sylvester and Daffy is a tendency to go on a long rant, complaining about a subject and then ending it by saying "Sakes".

Sylvester shows a lot of pride in himself, and never gives up. Despite (or perhaps because of) his pride and persistence, Sylvester is, with rare exceptions, placed squarely on the "loser" side of the Looney Tunes winner/loser hierarchy. He shows a different personality when paired with Porky Pig in explorations of spooky places, in which he does not speak, behaves as a scaredy-cat, and always seems to see the scary things Porky does not see and gets scolded by him for it every time.

For the most part, Sylvester has always played the antagonist role, but he is sometimes featured playing the protagonist in a couple of cartoons while having to deal with the canine duo of Spike and Chester after being chased around. In 1952's Tree for Two (directed by Friz Freleng), Sylvester is cornered in the back alley and this would result in Spike getting mauled by a black panther that had earlier escaped from a zoo without Spike and Chester knowing about it. In the 1954 film Dr. Jerkyl's Hide, Sylvester pummels Spike (here called "Alfie") thanks to a potion that transforms him into a feline monster. Both times after Spike's ordeal, Sylvester would have the courage and confidence to confront Chester, only to be beaten up and tossed away by the little dog.

Perhaps Sylvester's most developed role is in a series of Robert McKimson-directed shorts, in which the character is a hapless mouse-catching instructor to his dubious son, Sylvester Junior, with the "mouse" being a powerful baby kangaroo named Hippety Hopper which he constantly mistakes for a "giant mouse". His alternately confident and bewildered episodes bring his son to shame, while Sylvester himself is reduced to nervous breakdowns.

Sylvester also had atypical roles in a few cartoons:

- Kitty Kornered (1946), a Bob Clampett cartoon in which a black-nosed, yellow-eyed Sylvester was teamed with three other cats to oust owner Porky Pig from his house.
- Doggone Cats (1947), an Arthur Davis cartoon where Sylvester is teamed up with an orange cat (later reused as Sylvester's brother Alan in The Looney Tunes Show) to torment a dog named Wellington the Dog as he delivers a package to Uncle Louie.
- Catch as Cats Can (1947), another Davis cartoon that portrays Sylvester as a simple-minded cat with a dopey voice. While the cartoon essentially follows a cat-vs-canary plot, it takes a different approach as Sylvester is persuaded to eat the canary (caricatured as Frank Sinatra) by a green parrot (caricatured as Bing Crosby).
- Back Alley Oproar (1948), a Friz Freleng cartoon (actually a remake of the 1941 short Notes to You) wherein Sylvester pesters the sleep-deprived Elmer Fudd by performing several amazing musical numbers in the alley and even a sweet lullaby ("go to sleep... go to sleep... close your big bloodshot eyes...") to temporarily ease Elmer back to the dream world, though very temporarily.
- The Scarlet Pumpernickel (1950), a Chuck Jones cartoon in which Sylvester plays the Basil Rathbone-like villain to Daffy Duck's Errol Flynn-esque hero.
- Canned Feud (1951), another Freleng cartoon in which Sylvester tries to retrieve a can opener from a mouse out of fears he would starve to death. Unlike most cartoons, the mouse is portrayed as an instigator of the conflict or antagonist rather than Sylvester himself.
- Red Riding Hoodwinked (1955), another Freleng cartoon where Sylvester co-stars with an absent-minded Big Bad Wolf in which each not only tries to get their particular "prey" (Sylvester vs. Tweety and the Wolf vs. Little Red Riding Hood) but they both nearly come to blows with each other playing "Grandma". ("You're musclin' in on my racket!")
- A Taste of Catnip (1966), a Robert McKimson cartoon that Sylvester cameos in. When Daffy Duck blows up a catnip factory in Mexico, Sylvester and other enraged cats beat up Daffy.

In the television series Tiny Toon Adventures, Sylvester appeared as the mentor of Furrball. He also starred in The Sylvester & Tweety Mysteries. In the series, he plays the narrator at the beginning of episodes.

== Filmography ==
The character debuted in Friz Freleng's Life With Feathers (1945). Freleng's 1947 cartoon Tweetie Pie was the first pairing of Tweety Bird with Sylvester, and the Bob Clampett-directed Kitty Kornered (1946) was Sylvester's first pairing with Porky Pig.

He also appears in a handful of cartoons with Elmer Fudd, such as a series of three cartoons underwritten by the Alfred P. Sloan Foundation extolling the American economic system.

In the 1970s and 1980s, Sylvester appeared in various Warner Bros. television specials, and in the 1980s, he appeared in the feature-film compilations.

Sylvester has been "killed" more times than any other Warner Bros. cartoon character, having "died" in Peck Up Your Troubles, Back Alley Oproar, I Taw a Putty Tat, Mouse Mazurka, Bad Ol' Putty Tat, Tweety's S.O.S., Tweet Tweet Tweety, Ain't She Tweet, Cats a-Weigh, Satan's Waitin', Muzzle Tough, Sandy Claws, Tweety's Circus, Too Hop To Handle, Tree Cornered Tweety, Tweet and Lovely, Trick or Tweet (along with Sam Cat), The Wild Chase (along with Wile E. Coyote), Museum Scream, and the Looney Tunes Cartoons episodes "Fully Vetted" and "Boo! Appetweet". He was even cast in the role of the Jacob Marley-like ghost called Sylvester the Investor in Bah, Humduck! A Looney Tunes Christmas.

Sylvester serves as the titular character in The Sylvester & Tweety Mysteries (1995–2000), under the ownership of Granny and again having desires of eating Tweety and being thwarted by Butch. He helps solves mysteries and defeats the culprits in the end. In the finale of the series, he abandons his desire of eating Tweety following a nightmare and expresses his love for the bird.

A baby version of Sylvester is part of the title cast of characters in Baby Looney Tunes, voiced by Terry Klassen.

Sylvester is featured in The Looney Tunes Show (2011–14), voiced by Jeff Bergman. He is shown living with Granny alongside Tweety. In "Point, Laser Point", it is revealed that Sylvester was attracted by a glowing red dot that was on his mother's necklace when he was young as experienced through hypnotic therapy done by Witch Lezah. It was also revealed that his mother (voiced by Estelle Harris) has retired to Florida. When Sylvester visits her, she reveals she's disappointed that Sylvester isn't married, doesn't have kids, never kept wearing his retainer, never remembered where she lives in Florida, and has not caught Tweety yet. This episode also introduced Sylvester's brother Alan (voiced by Jeff Bennett) who became more successful than Sylvester. In "Ridiculous Journey", he and Tweety along with Taz ended up in snowy Alaska and they embark on an adventure to get back home all while a man named Blacque Jacque Shellacque was tracking them down. Turns out, Blacque Jacque Shellacque was Yosemite Sam's cousin and was trying to help them get back home all this time.

Sylvester also makes recurring appearances in both New Looney Tunes (2015–20) and Looney Tunes Cartoons (2020–24). Jeff Bergman reprises his role for both.

Sylvester appeared in King Tweety (2022). He was voiced by Eric Bauza, who also voiced him in Looney Tunes: World of Mayhem.

Sylvester appears in Bugs Bunny Builders (2022–25) as one of the citizens/builders helpings Bugs and friends with building. In this series, he is more of friends with Tweety and even lives with him.

=== Cameo appearances ===
In the movie Kitten with a Whip (1964), the Sylvester cartoon Canned Feud is shown playing on a television set that Jody Dvorak watches.

Sylvester (as well as Speedy Gonzales and Porky Pig) appeared in a skit seen at the end of an episode of the game show Press Your Luck. Earlier in the episode, Daffy Duck was incorrectly listed as the correct answer to the question "Which well-known cartoon character is famous for uttering the immortal words 'Sufferin' Succotash!'?" At the end of the episode, Mel Blanc called the show in his Sylvester voice to correct host Peter Tomarken on the gaffe. Tomarken assured "Sylvester" that future Looney Tunes-related questions would be run by Sylvester's office and that the three contestants in the episode would be given a second chance, as any spins that were to be awarded for the correct answer would have affected the course of the episode's gameplay.

Sylvester makes a cameo appearance in Who Framed Roger Rabbit (1988), where he provides the punchline for a double-entendre joke regarding Judge Doom's (Christopher Lloyd) identity. This was Mel Blanc's final time voicing him.

Sylvester appears as part of the Tune Squad team in Space Jam (1996), voiced by Bill Farmer. He bears the number 9 on his jersey where the Tune Squad and Michael Jordan competed against the Monstars.

He also has two cameo appearances in Looney Tunes: Back in Action (2003), but the second time, "Sylvester" is really Mr. Smith in disguise.

Sylvester appears in the Robot Chicken episode "Werewolf vs. Unicorn", voiced by Patrick Pinney. During Arnold Schwarzenegger's announcement of illegal aliens from Mexico, Sylvester demonstrates a wired fence that will keep the aliens out, only for it to be penetrated by Speedy Gonzales.

Sylvester makes a cameo appearance in the Tom and Jerry Tales episode "Kitty Cat Blues", on a poster in Miss Kitty's room.

Sylvester makes a vocal cameo appearance in the 2020 Animaniacs revival segment "Suffragette City", with Jeff Bergman reprising his role.

Sylvester appears in Space Jam: A New Legacy (2021), voiced again by Jeff Bergman. He plays for the Tune Squad in their match against the Goon Squad. At one point before the second half, Sylvester thought he found Michael Jordan in the audience which he revealed to the Tune Squad only for LeBron James to find that he actually ran into Michael B. Jordan. This caused Daffy Duck and Elmer Fudd to reprimand him for not noticing the difference as Sylvester thought he aged well.

Sylvester appears in the Teen Titans Go! episode, "Warner Bros. 100th Anniversary". He is among the Looney Tunes characters guests for the Warner Bros. centennial celebration.

Sylvester appears in Coyote vs. Acme (2026) in a non-speaking cameo. He's seen in Granny's house, sculpting a bust of Tweety after he had been taken by Acme.

== Other appearances ==
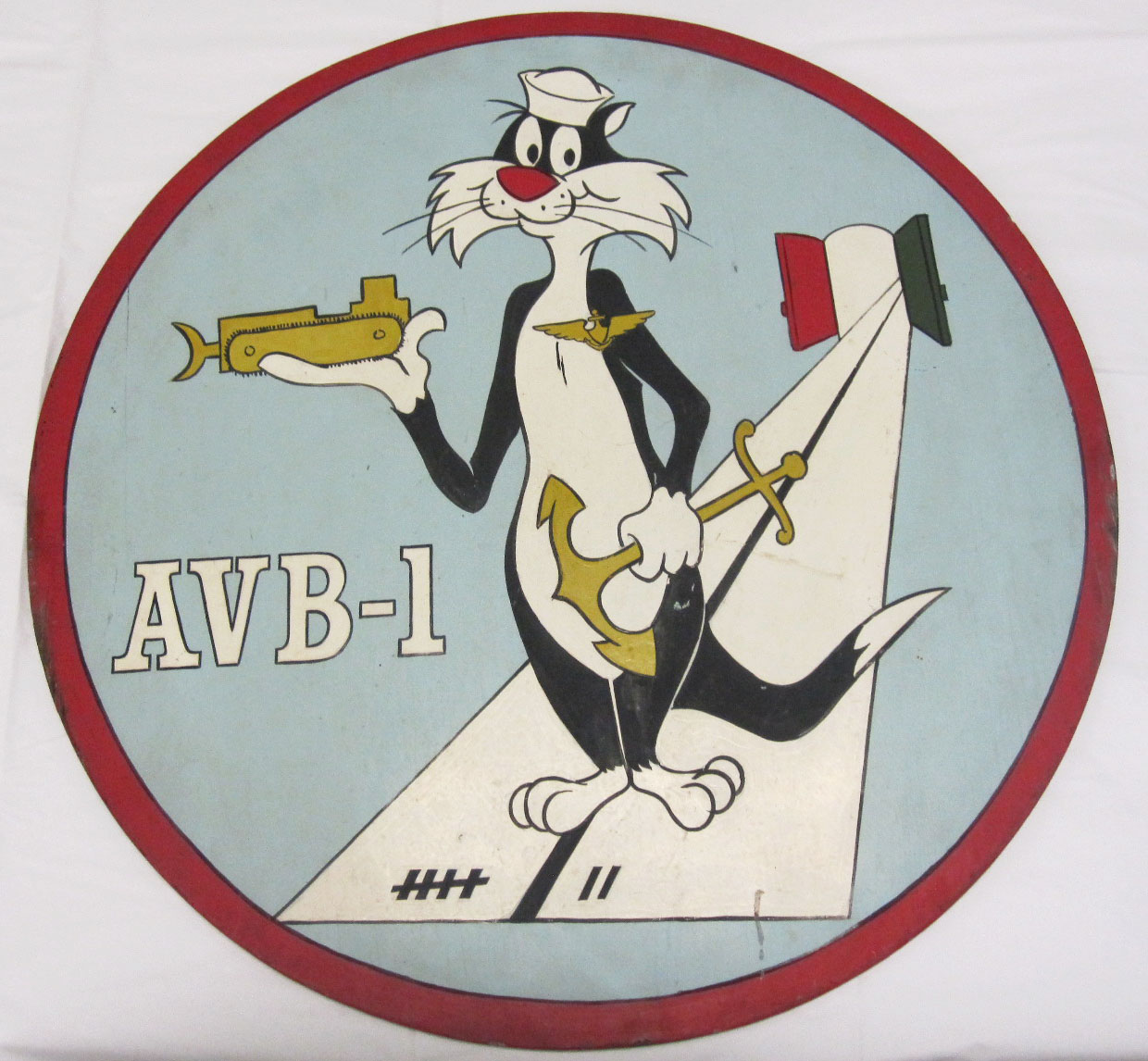
USS Alameda County

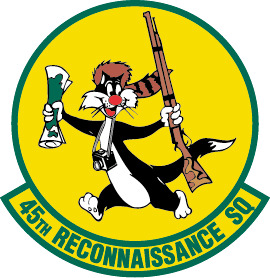
Sylvester as emblem of the 45th Reconnaissance Squadron

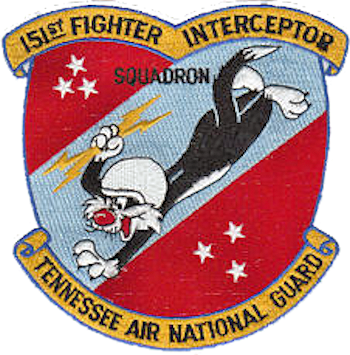
Sylvester as emblem of the 151st Fighter-Interceptor Squadron

Sylvester's design in The Looney Tunes Show

Sylvester and Tweety in "I Tawt I Taw a Puddy Tat"

From 1979 to 1983, Sylvester was the "spokescat" for 9Lives' line of dry cat food. His face appeared on the product's boxes, and Sylvester was also featured in a series of television commercials, directed by Duane Crowther and produced by Darr Hawthorne at Duck Soup Productions, and animated by Corny Cole, Bob Carlson, Craig Clark, Amby Paliwoda, Toby Bluth, Jeff Howard, and Mark Kausler. These ads usually consisted of Sylvester trying to get to his box of 9 Lives dry cat food while avoiding Marc Antony. Sylvester would always succeed in luring the dog away so he could get to his food, but would always find himself a target again by the end of the commercial, which generally ended with Sylvester calling 9 Lives dry cat food "worth riskin' your life for."

=== In comic books ===
Tweety and Sylvester No. 9, published in 1955

Tweety & Sylvester No. 100, published in 1979

Western Publications produced a comic book about Tweety and Sylvester entitled Tweety and Sylvester, first in Dell Comics Four Color series #406, 489, and 524, then in their own title from Dell Comics (#4–37, 1954–62), and later from Gold Key Comics (#1–102, 1963–72). In most of the earlier comic books, Sylvester has white fur surrounding his eyes (similar to Pepé Le Pew) and green eyes. They both disappeared in the later comic books. The green eyes could be seen in some merchandise as well.

Sylvester and Tweety appeared in a DC Comics and Looney Tunes crossover comic called Catwoman/Tweety and Sylvester #1. In the issue, witches from the DC and Looney Tunes universes placed a wager where the existence of all birds and cats (as well as all bird- and cat-themed heroes and villains) depended on if Sylvester could eat Tweety. Sylvester (designed more realistically for the DC Universe) teamed up with Catwoman, while Tweety teamed up with the Black Canary.

=== In video games ===
Sylvester has appeared in the video games Sylvester and Tweety in Cagey Capers, The Bugs Bunny Crazy Castle, The Bugs Bunny Birthday Blowout, Bugs Bunny Rabbit Rampage, Looney Tunes: Acme Arsenal, The Bugs Bunny Crazy Castle 2, Looney Tunes: Back in Action, Looney Tunes: Space Race, Bugs Bunny: Crazy Castle 3, Sylvester and Tweety: Breakfast on the Run, Loons: The Fight for Fame, and Looney Tunes: Wacky World of Sports.

== Naming ==
The name "Sylvester" is a play on Felis silvestris, the scientific name for the European wildcat (domestic cats like Sylvester are in the species Felis catus). Sylvester was not named until Chuck Jones gave him the name Sylvester, which was first used in Scaredy Cat. Although the character was named Sylvester in later cartoon shorts (beginning with 1948's Scaredy Cat), he was called "Thomas" in his first appearance with Tweety in Tweetie Pie, most likely as a reference to a male cat being called a tom. However, this name would never be used again because MGM already had a cat named Thomas from Tom and Jerry. Mel Blanc had also voiced a human character named Sylvester on Judy Canova's radio show earlier in the 1940s.

== Voice ==
=== Origin ===
Sylvester's trademark is his sloppy and yet stridulating lisp. In Mel Blanc's autobiography, That's Not All Folks!, Sylvester's voice is similar to Daffy Duck's, only not sped up in post-production, plus the even more exaggerated slobbery lisp. Conventional wisdom is that Daffy's lisp, and hence also Sylvester's, were based on the lisp of producer Leon Schlesinger. However, Blanc made no such claim. He said that Daffy's lisp was based on him having a long beak and that he borrowed the voice for Sylvester. He also said that Sylvester's voice was the closest to his natural voice, excluding the lisp (his son Noel Blanc has also confirmed this). In addition, director Bob Clampett, in a 1970 Funnyworld interview, agreed with Blanc's account concerning Schlesinger. Greg Ford once asked Blanc what was the difference between Daffy and Sylvester's voices. Blanc said to him that Daffy is a Jew and Sylvester is a Gentile.

=== Voice actors ===
- Mel Blanc (1945–1989, Bugs Bunny's Birthday Ball (1990); archive audio, Sylvester and Tweety in Cagey Capers (meowing) (1994); archive audio, Boomerang bumper (hiccup) (2004); archive audio, I Tawt I Taw a Puddy Tat (2011); archive audio)
- Bob Clampett (vocal effects in Kitty Kornered)
- Dave Barry (imitating Bing Crosby in Catch as Cats Can, Golden Records records, Bugs Bunny Songfest)
- Tedd Pierce (screaming in pain in I Taw a Putty Tat and Kit for Cat (reused from Porky the Wrestler))
- Danny Kaye (1951 I Taut I Taw a Puddy-Tat cover)
- Gilbert Mack (Golden Records records, Bugs Bunny Songfest)
- Dallas McKennon (meowing sounds in Daffy Duck and Porky Pig Meet the Groovie Goolies)
- Unknown (Bugs Bunny Exercise and Adventure Album)
- Bill Farmer (ABC Family Fun Fair, Space Jam)
- Darrell Hammond ("Wappin'")
- Jeff Bergman (1989 Macy's Thanksgiving Day Parade, Bugs Bunny's 50th Birthday Spectacular, Tiny Toon Adventures, Tyson Foods commercial, Bugs Bunny's Overtures to Disaster, Cartoon Network bumpers, Boomerang bumper, Family Guy, The Looney Tunes Show, Scooby Doo and Looney Tunes: Cartoon Universe, Looney Tunes Dash, New Looney Tunes, Daffy Duck Dance Off, Ani-Mayhem, Meet Bugs (and Daffy), Little Red Tweety Hood, Looney Tunes Cartoons, Animaniacs, Space Jam: A New Legacy, Bugs Bunny Builders, Tiny Toons Looniversity, Looney Tunes: Wacky World of Sports)
- Noel Blanc (You Rang? answering machine messages, "oofs" and "ows" in Bugs Bunny's Birthday Ball)
- Joe Alaskey (Tiny Toon Adventures, Mrs. Bush's Story Time, Looney Tunes River Ride, Yosemite Sam and the Gold River Adventure!, Tweety’s Global Patrol live show, Bugs Bunny Goin' Hollywood, Sylvester and Tweety in Cagey Capers, Have Yourself a Looney Tunes Christmas, Hip-Hop Hare, Carrotblanca read-along, Carrotblanca short, The Sylvester & Tweety Mysteries, The Looney West, Bugs & Friends Sing Elvis, Father of the Bird, Bugs Bunny's Learning Adventures, Warner Bros. Sing Along: Quest for Camelot, Looney Tunes: What's Up Rock?!, Warner Bros. Sing-Along: Looney Tunes, The Looney Tunes Rockin' Road Show, Crash! Bang! Boom! The Best of WB Sound FX, Tweety's High-Flying Adventure, The Looney Tunes Kwazy Christmas, Looney Tunes: Back In Action, Bah, Humduck! A Looney Tunes Christmas, Looney Tunes Dance Off, TomTom Looney Tunes GPS, Looney Tunes ClickN READ Phonics, additional vocal effects in I Tawt I Taw a Puddy Tat, various video games, webtoons, and commercials)
- Greg Burson (spitting in Bugs Bunny's Birthday Ball, Madcap Mardi Gras, The Toonite Show Starring Bugs Bunny, Looney Tunes B-Ball, Warner Bros. Kids Club)
- Keith Scott (Looney Tunes Musical Revue, The Christmas Looney Tunes Classic Collection, Westfield commercial, Spectacular Light and Sound Show Illuminanza, KFC commercials, Tazos Looney Tunes commercial, Looney Tunes: We Got the Beat!, Looney Tunes on Ice, Looney Tunes LIVE! Classroom Capers, Christmas Moments with Looney Tunes, The Looney Tunes Radio Show, Looney Rock)
- J. J. Sedelmaier (Cartoon Network presentation pitch)
- Marc Silk (Cartoon Network bumpers, CITV bumpers)
- Terry Klassen (Baby Looney Tunes, Baby Looney Tunes' Eggs-traordinary Adventure)
- Jeff Bennett (Museum Scream, A Looney Tunes Sing-A-Long Christmas)
- Pat Pinney (Robot Chicken)
- Kevin Shinick (Mad)
- Seth MacFarlane (Family Guy)
- Dee Bradley Baker (New Looney Tunes (monster form))
- Eric Bauza (Looney Tunes: World of Mayhem, Bugs Bunny in The Golden Carrot, Space Jam: A New Legacy live show, King Tweety, ACME Fools, Lights, Camera, Action: A WB100th Anniversary Celebration, ACME Fools LIVE!)

== Reception and legacy ==
Sylvester was No. 33 on TV Guide's list of top 50 best cartoon characters, together with Tweety.

== See also ==
- Tom and Jerry, a similar type of duo
