= Sylvester the Cat filmography =

Sylvester the Cat has been featured in various media since his debut in 1945.

== Golden age shorts ==
 Legend

LT
stands for Looney Tunes
MM
stands for Merrie Melodies

No.	Title	Original release date	Series	Directed by	Official DVD/Blu-Ray Availability	Notes
=== 1945 ===
1	Life with Feathers	March 24	MM	Friz Freleng	Blu-Ray/DVD: Looney Tunes Platinum Collection: Volume 3	First Sylvester cartoon directed by Friz Freleng; Nominated for the Academy Award for Best Short Subject (Cartoon)
2	Peck Up Your Troubles	October 20	MM	Friz Freleng	Blu-Ray: Looney Tunes Collector's Choice: Volume 4	
=== 1946 ===
3	Kitty Kornered	June 8	LT	Bob Clampett	DVD: Looney Tunes Golden Collection: Volume 2; DVD: Looney Tunes: Spotlight Collection Volume 2; Blu-Ray/DVD: Looney Tunes Platinum Collection: Volume 1	First pairing of Sylvester and Porky Pig; Only Sylvester cartoon directed by Bob Clampett
=== 1947 ===
4	Tweetie Pie	May 3	MM	Friz Freleng	DVD: Looney Tunes Golden Collection: Volume 2; DVD: Looney Tunes: Spotlight Collection Volume 2; DVD: Warner Bros. Home Entertainment Academy Awards Animation Collection; Blu-Ray/DVD: Looney Tunes Platinum Collection: Volume 1	First pairing of Sylvester and Tweety; First Warner Bros. cartoon to win the Academy Award for Best Short Subject (Cartoon); Sylvester is called "Thomas" in this cartoon
5	Crowing Pains	July 12	LT	Robert McKimson	DVD: Looney Tunes Golden Collection: Volume 6; DVD: Looney Tunes: Spotlight Collection Volume 6; Blu-Ray: Looney Tunes Collector's Vault: Volume 2	Only pairing of Sylvester, Foghorn Leghorn, and the Barnyard Dawg; first pairing of Sylvester and Henery Hawk; First Sylvester cartoon directed by Robert McKimson
6	Doggone Cats	October 25	MM	Arthur Davis	Blu-Ray: Looney Tunes Collector's Choice: Volume 1	First Sylvester cartoon directed by Arthur Davis
7	Catch as Cats Can	December 6	MM	Arthur Davis	Blu-Ray: Looney Tunes Collector's Choice: Volume 1	Final Sylvester cartoon directed by Arthur Davis
=== 1948 ===
8	Back Alley Oproar	March 27	MM	Friz Freleng	DVD: Looney Tunes Golden Collection: Volume 2; DVD: Looney Tunes: Spotlight Collection Volume 2; Blu-Ray/DVD: Looney Tunes Platinum Collection: Volume 2	First pairing of Sylvester and Elmer Fudd; Color remake of Notes to You
9	I Taw a Putty Tat	April 3	MM	Friz Freleng	Blu-Ray: Looney Tunes Collector's Vault: Volume 2	with Tweety; Color remake of Puss n' Booty
10	Hop, Look and Listen	April 17	LT	Robert McKimson	DVD: Looney Tunes Super Stars' Sylvester and Hippety Hopper: Marsupial Mayhem	First appearance of Hippety Hopper
11	Kit for Cat	November 6	LT	Friz Freleng	DVD: Looney Tunes Golden Collection: Volume 1; DVD: Looney Tunes: Spotlight Collection Volume 1	with Elmer Fudd
12	Scaredy Cat	December 18	MM	Chuck Jones	DVD: Looney Tunes Golden Collection: Volume 1; DVD/Blu-Ray: Looney Tunes Platinum Collection: Volume 1	with Porky Pig; First Sylvester cartoon directed by Chuck Jones; First use of Sylvester's name
=== 1949 ===
13	Mouse Mazurka	June 11	MM	Friz Freleng	Blu-Ray/DVD: Looney Tunes Mouse Chronicles: The Chuck Jones Collection (bonus feature, unrestored)	
14	Bad Ol' Putty Tat	July 23	MM	Friz Freleng	DVD: Looney Tunes Golden Collection: Volume 2; DVD: Looney Tunes: Spotlight Collection Volume 2; DVD: Looney Tunes Super Stars' Tweety & Sylvester: Feline Fwenzy	with Tweety
15	Hippety Hopper	November 19	MM	Robert McKimson	DVD: Looney Tunes Golden Collection: Volume 2 (bonus feature, unrestored); DVD: Looney Tunes Super Stars' Sylvester and Hippety Hopper: Marsupial Mayhem	with Hippety Hopper
=== 1950 ===
16	Home, Tweet Home	January 14	MM	Friz Freleng	Blu-Ray/DVD: Looney Tunes Platinum Collection: Volume 2	with Tweety
17	The Scarlet Pumpernickel	March 4	LT	Chuck Jones	DVD: Looney Tunes Golden Collection: Volume 1; DVD: The Essential Daffy Duck; Blu-Ray/DVD: Looney Tunes Platinum Collection: Volume 1	with Daffy Duck, Porky Pig, Elmer Fudd, Henery Hawk, and others; First pairing of Sylvester and Daffy Duck; Final pairing of Sylvester and Henery Hawk
18	All a Bir-r-r-d	June 24	LT	Friz Freleng	DVD: Looney Tunes Golden Collection: Volume 2; DVD: Looney Tunes: Spotlight Collection Volume 2; DVD: Looney Tunes Super Stars' Tweety & Sylvester: Feline Fwenzy	with Tweety
19	Canary Row	October 7	MM	Friz Freleng	DVD: Looney Tunes Golden Collection: Volume 1; DVD: Looney Tunes: Spotlight Collection: Volume 1; DVD: Looney Tunes Super Stars' Tweety & Sylvester: Feline Fwenzy; Blu-Ray/DVD: Looney Tunes Platinum Collection: Volume 3	with Tweety; First appearance of Granny; Nominated for the Academy Award for Best Short Subject (Cartoon), though the nomination was later withdrawn by producer Eddie Selzer
20	Stooge for a Mouse	October 21	MM	Friz Freleng	Blu-Ray: Looney Tunes Collector's Choice: Volume 1	
21	Pop 'Im Pop!	October 28	LT	Robert McKimson	DVD: Looney Tunes Super Stars' Sylvester and Hippety Hopper: Marsupial Mayhem	with Hippety Hopper; First appearance of Sylvester Jr.
=== 1951 ===
22	Canned Feud	February 3	LT	Friz Freleng	DVD: Looney Tunes Golden Collection: Volume 1; DVD: Looney Tunes: Spotlight Collection Volume 1; Blu-Ray/DVD: Looney Tunes Platinum Collection: Volume 2	
23	Putty Tat Trouble	February 24	LT	Friz Freleng	DVD: Looney Tunes Golden Collection: Volume 1; DVD: Looney Tunes: Spotlight Collection Volume 1; DVD: Looney Tunes Super Stars' Tweety & Sylvester: Feline Fwenzy	with Tweety; First appearance of Sam Cat
24	Room and Bird	June 2	MM	Friz Freleng	DVD: Looney Tunes Golden Collection: Volume 2; DVD: Looney Tunes: Spotlight Collection Volume 2; DVD: Looney Tunes Super Stars' Tweety & Sylvester: Feline Fwenzy	with Tweety and Granny
25	Tweety's S.O.S.	September 22	MM	Friz Freleng	DVD: Looney Tunes Golden Collection: Volume 1; DVD: Looney Tunes: Spotlight Collection Volume 1; DVD: Looney Tunes Super Stars' Tweety & Sylvester: Feline Fwenzy	with Tweety and Granny
26	Tweet Tweet Tweety	December 15	LT	Friz Freleng	DVD: Looney Tunes Golden Collection: Volume 2; DVD: Looney Tunes: Spotlight Collection Volume 2; DVD: Looney Tunes Super Stars' Tweety & Sylvester: Feline Fwenzy	with Tweety
=== 1952 ===
27	Who's Kitten Who?	January 5	LT	Robert McKimson	DVD: Looney Tunes Super Stars' Sylvester and Hippety Hopper: Marsupial Mayhem	with Hippety Hopper and Sylvester Jr.
28	Gift Wrapped	February 16	LT	Friz Freleng	DVD: Looney Tunes Golden Collection: Volume 2; DVD: Looney Tunes: Spotlight Collection Volume 2; DVD: Looney Tunes Super Stars' Tweety & Sylvester: Feline Fwenzy; Blu-Ray/DVD: Looney Tunes Platinum Collection: Volume 2	with Tweety and Granny
29	Little Red Rodent Hood	May 3	MM	Friz Freleng	DVD: Looney Tunes Golden Collection: Volume 5; DVD: Looney Tunes: Spotlight Collection Volume 5; Blu-Ray/DVD: Looney Tunes Platinum Collection: Volume 2	
30	Ain't She Tweet	June 21	LT	Friz Freleng	DVD: Looney Tunes Golden Collection: Volume 2; DVD: Looney Tunes: Spotlight Collection Volume 2; DVD: Looney Tunes Super Stars' Tweety & Sylvester: Feline Fwenzy; Blu-Ray: Looney Tunes Collector's Vault: Volume 1	with Tweety and Granny
31	Hoppy-Go-Lucky	August 9	LT	Robert McKimson	DVD: Looney Tunes Super Stars' Sylvester and Hippety Hopper: Marsupial Mayhem	with Hippety Hopper
32	A Bird In A Guilty Cage	August 30	LT	Friz Freleng	DVD: Looney Tunes Golden Collection: Volume 2; DVD: Looney Tunes: Spotlight Collection Volume 2; Blu-Ray: Looney Tunes Collector's Vault: Volume 2	with Tweety
33	Tree for Two	October 4	MM	Friz Freleng	Blu-Ray/DVD: Looney Tunes Platinum Collection: Volume 3	First appearance of Spike the Bulldog and Chester the Terrier
=== 1953 ===
34	Snow Business	January 17	LT	Friz Freleng	DVD: Looney Tunes Golden Collection: Volume 2; DVD: Looney Tunes: Spotlight Collection Volume 2; DVD: Looney Tunes Super Stars' Tweety & Sylvester: Feline Fwenzy; Blu-Ray: Looney Tunes Collector's Vault: Volume 1	with Tweety and Granny
35	A Mouse Divided	January 31	MM	Friz Freleng	Blu-Ray: Looney Tunes Collector's Choice: Volume 1	
36	Fowl Weather	April 4	MM	Friz Freleng	Blu-Ray: Looney Tunes Collector's Vault: Volume 2	with Tweety and Granny
37	Tom Tom Tomcat	June 27	MM	Friz Freleng	Currently Unavailable	with Tweety and Granny; Rarely shown due to Native American stereotyping.
38	A Street Cat Named Sylvester	September 5	LT	Friz Freleng	Blu-Ray: Looney Tunes Collector's Vault: Volume 2	with Tweety and Granny
39	Catty Cornered	October 31	MM	Friz Freleng	Blu-Ray: Looney Tunes Collector's Choice: Volume 2	with Tweety and Rocky; Only pairing of Sylvester and Rocky
40	Cats A-Weigh!	November 28	MM	Robert McKimson	DVD: Looney Tunes Super Stars' Sylvester and Hippety Hopper: Marsupial Mayhem	with Hippety Hopper and Sylvester Jr.
=== 1954 ===
41	Dog Pounded	January 2	LT	Friz Freleng	DVD: Looney Tunes Super Stars' Pepé Le Pew: Zee Best of Zee Best; Blu-Ray/DVD:Looney Tunes Platinum Collection: Volume 3	with Tweety and Pepé Le Pew; Only pairing of Sylvester and Pepé Le Pew
42	Bell Hoppy	April 17	MM	Robert McKimson	DVD: Looney Tunes Super Stars' Sylvester and Hippety Hopper: Marsupial Mayhem	with Hippety Hopper
43	Dr. Jerkyl's Hide	May 8	LT	Friz Freleng	Blu-Ray: Looney Tunes Collector's Vault: Volume 2	Final appearance of Spike the Bulldog and Chester the Terrier
44	Claws for Alarm	May 22	MM	Chuck Jones	DVD: Looney Tunes Golden Collection: Volume 3; DVD: Looney Tunes: Spotlight Collection Volume 8; Blu-Ray: Looney Tunes Collector's Vault: Volume 2	with Porky Pig
45	Muzzle Tough	June 26	MM	Friz Freleng	Blu-Ray: Looney Tunes Collector's Choice: Volume 4	with Tweety and Granny
46	Satan's Waitin'	August 7	LT	Friz Freleng	DVD: Looney Tunes Golden Collection: Volume 6; DVD: Looney Tunes: Spotlight Collection Volume 6; DVD: Looney Tunes Super Stars' Tweety & Sylvester: Feline Fwenzy; Blu-Ray/DVD: Looney Tunes Platinum Collection: Volume 3	with Tweety
47	By Word of Mouse	October 2	LT	Friz Freleng	DVD: Looney Tunes Golden Collection: Volume 6; DVD: Looney Tunes: Spotlight Collection Volume 6	
=== 1955 ===
48	Lighthouse Mouse	March 12	MM	Robert McKimson	DVD: Looney Tunes Super Stars' Sylvester and Hippety Hopper: Marsupial Mayhem	with Hippety Hopper
49	Sandy Claws	April 2	LT	Friz Freleng	DVD: Warner Bros. Home Entertainment Academy Awards Animation Collection; Blu-Ray/DVD: Looney Tunes Platinum Collection: Volume 3	with Tweety and Granny; Nominated for the Academy Award for Best Short Subject (Cartoon)
50	Tweety's Circus	June 4	MM	Friz Freleng	Blu-Ray: Looney Tunes Collector's Vault: Volume 1	with Tweety
51	Jumpin' Jupiter	August 6	MM	Chuck Jones	DVD: Looney Tunes Golden Collection: Volume 6; DVD: Looney Tunes: Spotlight Collection Volume 6; Blu-Ray: Looney Tunes Collector's Vault: Volume 2	Final pairing of Sylvester and Porky Pig; Final Sylvester cartoon directed by Chuck Jones
52	A Kiddie's Kitty	August 20	MM	Friz Freleng	Blu-Ray: Looney Tunes Collector's Vault: Volume 1	
53	Speedy Gonzales	September 17	MM	Friz Freleng	DVD: Looney Tunes Golden Collection: Volume 1; DVD: Looney Tunes: Spotlight Collection Volume 1; DVD: Warner Bros. Home Entertainment Academy Awards Animation Collection; Blu-Ray/DVD:Looney Tunes Platinum Collection: Volume 1	First pairing of Sylvester and Speedy Gonzales; Won the Academy Award for Best Short Subject (Cartoon)
54	Red Riding Hoodwinked	October 29	LT	Friz Freleng	DVD: Looney Tunes Golden Collection: Volume 5; DVD: Looney Tunes: Spotlight Collection Volume 5; Blu-Ray: Looney Tunes Collector's Vault: Volume 1	with Tweety and Granny
55	Heir-Conditioned	November 26	LT	Friz Freleng	DVD: Looney Tunes Golden Collection: Volume 6; DVD: Looney Tunes: Spotlight Collection Volume 6 (as a bonus cartoon)	with Elmer Fudd
56	Pappy's Puppy	December 17	MM	Friz Freleng	Currently Unavailable	
=== 1956 ===
57	Too Hop to Handle	January 28	LT	Robert McKimson	DVD: Looney Tunes Super Stars' Sylvester and Hippety Hopper: Marsupial Mayhem	with Hippety Hopper and Sylvester Jr.
58	Tweet and Sour	March 24	LT	Friz Freleng	Blu-Ray: Looney Tunes Collector's Vault: Volume 3	with Tweety, Granny, and Sam Cat
59	Tree Cornered Tweety	May 19	MM	Friz Freleng	Blu-Ray: Looney Tunes Collector's Vault: Volume 3	with Tweety
60	The Unexpected Pest	June 2	MM	Robert McKimson	DVD: Looney Tunes Golden Collection: Volume 4; DVD: Looney Tunes: Spotlight Collection Volume 4	
61	Tugboat Granny	June 23	MM	Friz Freleng	Blu-Ray: Looney Tunes Collector's Choice: Volume 3	with Tweety and Granny
62	The Slap-Hoppy Mouse	September 1	MM	Robert McKimson	DVD: Looney Tunes Super Stars' Sylvester and Hippety Hopper: Marsupial Mayhem	with Hippety Hopper and Sylvester Jr.
63	Yankee Dood It	October 13	MM	Friz Freleng	DVD: Looney Tunes Golden Collection: Volume 6; DVD: Looney Tunes: Spotlight Collection Volume 6 (as a bonus cartoon)	Final pairing of Sylvester and Elmer Fudd
=== 1957 ===
64	Tweet Zoo	January 12	MM	Friz Freleng	Currently Unavailable	with Tweety
65	Tweety and the Beanstalk	May 16	MM	Friz Freleng	DVD: Looney Tunes Golden Collection: Volume 5; DVD: Looney Tunes: Spotlight Collection Volume 5; DVD: Looney Tunes Super Stars' Tweety & Sylvester: Feline Fwenzy	with Tweety
66	Birds Anonymous	August 10	MM	Friz Freleng	DVD: Looney Tunes Golden Collection: Volume 3; DVD: Warner Bros. Home Entertainment Academy Awards Animation Collection; DVD: Looney Tunes: Spotlight Collection Volume 7; DVD: Looney Tunes Super Stars' Tweety & Sylvester: Feline Fwenzy; Blu-Ray/DVD: Looney Tunes Platinum Collection: Volume 3	with Tweety; Won the Academy Award for Best Short Subject (Cartoon)
67	Greedy for Tweety	September 28	LT	Friz Freleng	Blu-Ray: Looney Tunes Collector's Choice: Volume 1	with Tweety and Granny
68	Mouse-Taken Identity	November 16	MM	Robert McKimson	Blu-Ray/DVD: Looney Tunes Mouse Chronicles: The Chuck Jones Collection (bonus feature, unrestored); DVD: Looney Tunes Super Stars' Sylvester and Hippety Hopper: Marsupial Mayhem	with Hippety Hopper and Sylvester Jr.
69	Gonzales' Tamales	November 30	LT	Friz Freleng	DVD: Looney Tunes Golden Collection: Volume 3; Blu-Ray: Looney Tunes Collector's Vault: Volume 1	with Speedy Gonzales
=== 1958 ===
70	A Pizza Tweety Pie	February 22	LT	Friz Freleng	Blu-Ray: Looney Tunes Collector's Vault: Volume 3	with Tweety and Granny
71	A Bird in a Bonnet	September 27	MM	Friz Freleng	Currently Unavailable	with Tweety and Granny
=== 1959 ===
72	Trick or Tweet	March 21	MM	Friz Freleng	Blu-Ray: Looney Tunes Collector's Vault: Volume 3	with Tweety and Sam Cat
73	Tweet and Lovely	July 18	MM	Friz Freleng	Blu-Ray: Looney Tunes Collector's Vault: Volume 1	with Tweety
74	Cat's Paw	August 15	LT	Robert McKimson	DVD: Looney Tunes Super Stars' Sylvester and Hippety Hopper: Marsupial Mayhem	with Sylvester Jr.
75	Here Today, Gone Tamale	August 29	LT	Friz Freleng	DVD: Looney Tunes Golden Collection: Volume 4	with Speedy Gonzales
76	Tweet Dreams	December 5	LT	Friz Freleng	Currently Unavailable	with Tweety and Granny; Utilizes footage from Cheese It, the Cat!, Too Hop to Handle, Sandy Claws, Tweety's Circus, A Street Cat Named Sylvester, and Gift Wrapped.
=== 1960 ===
77	West of the Pesos	January 23	MM	Robert McKimson	DVD: Looney Tunes Golden Collection: Volume 4	with Speedy Gonzales
78	Goldimouse and the Three Cats	March 15	LT	Friz Freleng	DVD: Looney Tunes Golden Collection: Volume 5; DVD: Looney Tunes: Spotlight Collection Volume 5; DVD: Looney Tunes Super Stars' Sylvester and Hippety Hopper: Marsupial Mayhem; Blu-Ray: Looney Tunes Collector's Vault: Volume 3	with Sylvester Jr.
79	Hyde and Go Tweet	May 14	MM	Friz Freleng	Blu-Ray: Looney Tunes Collector's Choice: Volume 4	with Tweety
80	Mouse and Garden	July 16	LT	Friz Freleng	DVD: Looney Tunes Golden Collection: Volume 4; DVD: Looney Tunes: Spotlight Collection Volume 4; Blu-Ray/DVD: Looney Tunes Platinum Collection: Volume 3	Final pairing of Sylvester and Sam Cat; Nominated for the Academy Award for Best Short Subject (Cartoon)
81	Trip for Tat	October 29	MM	Friz Freleng	Currently Unavailable	with Tweety and Granny
=== 1961 ===
82	Cannery Woe	January 7	LT	Robert McKimson	DVD: Looney Tunes Golden Collection: Volume 4	with Speedy Gonzales
83	Hoppy Daze	February 11	LT	Robert McKimson	DVD: Looney Tunes Super Stars' Sylvester and Hippety Hopper: Marsupial Mayhem	with Hippety Hopper
84	Birds of a Father	April 1	LT	Robert McKimson	DVD: Looney Tunes Super Stars' Sylvester and Hippety Hopper: Marsupial Mayhem	with Sylvester Jr.
85	D' Fightin' Ones	April 22	MM	Friz Freleng	Blu-Ray: Looney Tunes Collector's Choice: Volume 4	
86	The Rebel Without Claws	July 15	LT	Friz Freleng	Blu-Ray: Looney Tunes Collector's Choice: Volume 2	with Tweety
87	The Pied Piper of Guadalupe	August 19	LT	Friz Freleng and Hawley Pratt (co-director)	DVD: Looney Tunes Golden Collection: Volume 4; DVD: Looney Tunes: Spotlight Collection Volume 8; Blu-Ray/DVD: Looney Tunes Platinum Collection: Volume 3	with Speedy Gonzales; Nominated for the Academy Award for Best Short Subject (Cartoon)
88	The Last Hungry Cat	December 2	MM	Friz Freleng and Hawley Pratt (co-director)	DVD: Looney Tunes Golden Collection: Volume 3; DVD: Looney Tunes Super Stars' Tweety & Sylvester: Feline Fwenzy; DVD: Looney Tunes: Spotlight Collection Volume 8; Blu-Ray: Looney Tunes Collector's Vault: Volume 2	with Tweety
=== 1962 ===
89	Fish and Slips	March 10	LT	Robert McKimson	DVD: Looney Tunes Super Stars' Sylvester and Hippety Hopper: Marsupial Mayhem	with Sylvester Jr.
90	Mexican Boarders	May 12	LT	Friz Freleng	DVD: Looney Tunes Golden Collection: Volume 4; Blu-Ray: Looney Tunes Collector's Vault: Volume 2	with Speedy Gonzales
91	The Jet Cage	September 22	LT	Friz Freleng	Currently Unavailable	with Tweety and Granny
=== 1963 ===
92	Mexican Cat Dance	April 20	LT	Friz Freleng	Currently Unavailable	with Speedy Gonzales
93	Chili Weather	August 17	MM	Friz Freleng	DVD: Looney Tunes Golden Collection: Volume 4	with Speedy Gonzales
94	Claws in the Lease	November 9	MM	Robert McKimson	DVD: Looney Tunes Super Stars' Sylvester and Hippety Hopper: Marsupial Mayhem	with Sylvester Jr.
=== 1964 ===
95	A Message to Gracias	February 8	LT	Robert McKimson	DVD: Looney Tunes Golden Collection: Volume 4	with Speedy Gonzales
96	Freudy Cat	March 14	LT	Robert McKimson	DVD: Looney Tunes Super Stars' Sylvester and Hippety Hopper: Marsupial Mayhem	Final appearance of Hippety Hopper and Sylvester Jr.; Utilizes footage from Who's Kitten Who?, Cats A-Weigh!, and The Slap-Hoppy Mouse.
97	Nuts and Volts	April 25	LT	Friz Freleng	DVD: Looney Tunes Golden Collection: Volume 4	with Speedy Gonzales
98	Hawaiian Aye Aye	June 27	MM	Gerry Chiniquy	Currently Unavailable	With Tweety and Granny; Final appearance of Tweety; Only Sylvester cartoon directed by Gerry Chiniquy; Final Sylvester cartoon produced by Warner Bros. Cartoons
99	Road to Andalay	December 26	MM	Friz Freleng and Hawley Pratt (co-director)	Blu-Ray: Looney Tunes Collector's Choice: Volume 4	with Speedy Gonzales; First Sylvester cartoon produced by DePatie–Freleng Enterprises
=== 1965 ===
100	It's Nice to Have a Mouse Around the House	January 16	LT	Friz Freleng and Hawley Pratt (co-director)	Blu-Ray/DVD: Looney Tunes Mouse Chronicles: The Chuck Jones Collection (bonus feature, unrestored)	with Speedy Gonzales, Daffy Duck, and Granny; Final pairing of Sylvester and Granny
101	Cats and Bruises	January 30	MM	Friz Freleng and Hawley Pratt (co-director)	Currently Unavailable	with Speedy Gonzales; Final cartoon in which Sylvester speaks
102	The Wild Chase	February 27	MM	Friz Freleng and Hawley Pratt (co-director)	DVD: Looney Tunes Golden Collection: Volume 4	with Speedy Gonzales, Wile E. Coyote and the Road Runner; Only pairing of Sylvester and Wile E. Coyote and the Road Runner; Final official pairing of Sylvester and Speedy Gonzales; Final Sylvester cartoon directed by Friz Freleng
=== 1966 ===
103	A Taste of Catnip	December 3	MM	Robert McKimson	Currently Unavailable	with Speedy Gonzales and Daffy Duck; Final overall pairing of Sylvester and Speedy Gonzales; final pairing of Sylvester and Daffy Duck; Final Sylvester cartoon directed by Robert McKimson; Final Sylvester cartoon produced by DePatie–Freleng Enterprises; Final theatrical Sylvester cartoon until 1995

== Post-golden age media ==
- Bugs Bunny's Christmas Carol (1979)
- The Yolk's on You (1980)
- Who Framed Roger Rabbit (cameo, 1988)
- Bugs Bunny's Overtures to Disaster, voiced by Jeff Bergman (1991)
- Carrotblanca, voiced by Joe Alaskey (1995)
- The Sylvester & Tweety Mysteries (1995–2002)
- Space Jam, voiced by Bill Farmer (1996)
- Father of the Bird, voiced by Joe Alaskey (1998)
- Tweety's High-Flying Adventure (2000)
- Baby Looney Tunes, voiced by Terry Klassen (2002–2005)
- Baby Looney Tunes' Eggs-traordinary Adventure, voiced by Terry Klassen (2003)
- Looney Tunes: Back in Action, voiced by Joe Alaskey (2003)
- Museum Scream, voiced by Jeff Bennett (2004)
- Bah, Humduck! A Looney Tunes Christmas, voiced by Joe Alaskey (2006)
- The Looney Tunes Show, voiced by Jeff Bergman (2011–2013)
- I Tawt I Taw a Puddy Tat, voiced by Mel Blanc (from archival recordings) (2011)
- Flash in the Pain (cameo, 2014)
- New Looney Tunes, voiced by Jeff Bergman (2017–2020)
- Looney Tunes Cartoons, voiced by Jeff Bergman (2020–2024)
- Teen Titans Go! See Space Jam, voiced by Bill Farmer (from archival recordings) (2021)
- Space Jam: A New Legacy, voiced by Jeff Bergman (2021)
- King Tweety, voiced by Eric Bauza (2022)
- Bugs Bunny Builders, voiced by Jeff Bergman (2022–2025)
- Coyote vs. Acme, voiced by Jeff Bergman (2026)

=== Webtoons ===
- "Twick or Tweety"
- "Aluminium Chef - Sylvester Cat vs. Tweety Bird"
- "Judge Granny - Case 2: Tweety vs. Sylvester"
- "Full Metal Racket"
- "Malltown and Tazboy" (cameo)
- "Mysterious Phenomena of the Unexplained - #1 Sufferin' Sasquatch"
- "Mysterious Phenomena of the Unexplained - #5 The Bermuda Short"
- "Toon Marooned" series
- "The Junkyard Run" (parts 1-3)
- "Sports Blab" (numbers 1 and 2)
