= Looney Tunes Super Stars =

Series of DVDs

Looney Tunes Super Stars is a series of nine Looney Tunes DVDs consisting of two Bugs Bunny DVDs and other characters who got their own collections. It started on August 10, 2010, and ran until April 23, 2013. The series consists of:

Title	Cartoons	New cartoons	Wave	Release date
Looney Tunes Super Stars' Bugs Bunny: Hare Extraordinaire	15	15	1	August 10, 2010
Looney Tunes Super Stars' Daffy Duck: Frustrated Fowl	15	15	1	August 10, 2010
Looney Tunes Super Stars' Foghorn Leghorn & Friends: Barnyard Bigmouth	15	14	1	November 30, 2010
Looney Tunes Super Stars' Tweety & Sylvester: Feline Fwenzy	15	0	1	November 30, 2010
Looney Tunes Super Stars' Bugs Bunny: Wascally Wabbit	15	0	2	May 4, 2011
Looney Tunes Super Stars' Road Runner and Wile E. Coyote: Supergenius Hijinks	15	11	2	October 4, 2011
Looney Tunes Super Stars' Pepé Le Pew: Zee Best of Zee Best	17	14	2	December 27, 2011
Looney Tunes Super Stars' Porky & Friends: Hilarious Ham	18	16	3	November 6, 2012
Looney Tunes Super Stars' Sylvester & Hippety Hopper: Marsupial Mayhem	18	15	3	April 23, 2013

Although Super Stars is the semi-successor to the Looney Tunes Golden Collection series, the true successor to the Golden Collection is the Looney Tunes Platinum Collection. However, unlike the Platinum Collection, there are no special features in the Super Stars series. While other volumes were planned, no further releases were made after 2013. The Pepe Le Pew: Zee Best of Zee Best and the Sylvester & Hippety Hopper: Marsupial Mayhem DVDs are now the only home media releases from Warner Bros. Discovery Home Entertainment to have a major Looney Tunes character's (and two minor Looney Tunes characters') entire filmography featured.

== Foghorn Leghorn & Friends: Barnyard Bigmouth ==
Foghorn Leghorn & Friends: Barnyard Bigmouth
- Directed by: Robert McKimson, Friz Freleng
- Produced by: Eddie Selzer, John W. Burton, David H. DePatie
- Starring: Mel Blanc (voice)
- Distributed by: Warner Home Video
- Release date: November 30, 2010 (United States)
- Running time: 125 minutes
- Country: United States
- Language: English

Looney Tunes Super Stars' Foghorn Leghorn & Friends: Barnyard Bigmouth was released on November 30, 2010. Unlike previous Super Stars discs, the disc not only contains the matted-widescreen versions of the cartoons, but the original fullscreen versions as well.

#	Title	Characters	Year	Director	Series
1	All Fowled Up	Foghorn, Barnyard, Henery	1955	Robert McKimson	LT
2	Fox-Terror	Foghorn, Barnyard	1957	Robert McKimson	MM
3	A Broken Leghorn*	Foghorn, Prissy	1959	Robert McKimson	LT
4	Crockett-Doodle-Do	Foghorn, Egghead Jr.	1960	Robert McKimson	MM
5	Weasel While You Work	Foghorn, Barnyard, Weasel	1958	Robert McKimson	MM
6	Weasel Stop	Foghorn, Weasel	1956	Robert McKimson	LT
7	Little Boy Boo	Foghorn, Egghead Jr., Prissy	1954	Robert McKimson	LT
8	Banty Raids	Foghorn, Barnyard	1963	Robert McKimson	MM
9	Strangled Eggs	Foghorn, Henery, Prissy	1961	Robert McKimson	MM
10	Gopher Broke	Barnyard, Goofy Gophers	1958	Robert McKimson	LT
11	A Mutt in a Rut	Elmer	1959	Robert McKimson	LT
12	Mouse-Placed Kitten		1959	Robert McKimson	MM
13	Cheese It, the Cat!	The Honey-Mousers	1957	Robert McKimson	LT
14	Two Crows from Tacos	Jose and Manuel	1956	Friz Freleng	MM
15	Crows' Feat	Elmer, Jose and Manuel	1962	Friz Freleng, Hawley Pratt	MM

(*) Have been released on the Golden Collection DVD set

== Tweety & Sylvester: Feline Fwenzy ==
Tweety & Sylvester: Feline Fwenzy
- Directed by: Friz Freleng
- Produced by: Eddie Selzer, John W. Burton, David H. DePatie
- Starring: Sylvester, Tweety, Granny, Mel Blanc (voice)
- Distributed by: Warner Home Video
- Release date: November 30, 2010 (United States)
- Running time: 125 minutes
- Country: United States
- Language: English

Looney Tunes Super Stars' Tweety & Sylvester: Feline Fwenzy was released on November 30, 2010. It was released in the United Kingdom as Sylvester & Friends on July 4, 2011.

All cartoons on this disc star Sylvester and Tweety, were directed by Friz Freleng, and were previously released on the Golden Collection DVDs.

#	Title	Co-stars	Year	Series
1	Tweetie Pie		1947	MM
2	Bad Ol' Putty Tat		1949	MM
3	All a Bir-r-r-d	Hector	1950	LT
4	Canary Row	Granny	1950	MM
5	Putty Tat Trouble	Sam Cat	1951	LT
6	Room and Bird	Granny, Hector	1951	MM
7	Tweety's S.O.S.	Granny	1951	MM
8	Tweet Tweet Tweety		1951	LT
9	Gift Wrapped	Granny, Hector	1952	LT
10	Ain't She Tweet	Granny, Hector	1952	LT
11	Snow Business	Granny	1953	LT
12	Satan's Waitin'	Hector	1954	LT
13	The Last Hungry Cat	Granny	1961	MM
14	Birds Anonymous	Clarence Cat	1957	MM
15	Tweety and the Beanstalk	Hector	1957	MM

=== Notes ===
- While the USA version of this DVD set releases "Bad Ol' Putty Tat" and "Snow Business" restored, for reasons unknown, the European version of this DVD set for some reason releases "Bad Ol' Putty Tat" presented as a 1998 dubbed version (albeit without the dubbed notice) and "Snow Business" presented unrestored as the Stars of Space Jam VHS transfer with the altered 1959-1960 Merrie Melodies ending card on the European DVD release.

== Bugs Bunny: Wascally Wabbit ==
Bugs Bunny: Wascally Wabbit
- Directed by: Tex Avery, Friz Freleng, Robert McKimson, Chuck Jones, Arthur Davis, Abe Levitow
- Produced by: Leon Schlesinger, Eddie Selzer
- Starring: Bugs Bunny, Elmer Fudd, Daffy Duck, Yosemite Sam, Mel Blanc (voice)
- Distributed by: Warner Home Video
- Release date: May 4, 2011 (Czech Republic)
- Running time: 125 minutes
- Country: United States
- Language: English

Looney Tunes Super Stars' Bugs Bunny: Wascally Wabbit was released on May 4, 2011 (in Region 2 and 4).

All cartoons on this disc star Bugs Bunny and were previously released on the Golden Collection DVDs.

#	Title	Co-stars	Year	Director	Series
1	Tortoise Beats Hare	Cecil	1941	Tex Avery	MM
2	Super-Rabbit		1943	Chuck Jones	MM
3	Rabbit Fire	Daffy, Elmer	1951	Chuck Jones	LT
4	Baton Bunny		1959	Chuck Jones and Abe Levitow	LT
5	Rabbit of Seville	Elmer	1950	Chuck Jones	LT
6	Big Top Bunny		1951	Robert McKimson	MM
7	Bowery Bugs		1949	Arthur Davis	MM
8	Gorilla My Dreams	Gruesome Gorilla	1948	Robert McKimson	LT
9	Long-Haired Hare		1949	Chuck Jones	LT
10	High Diving Hare	Sam	1949	Friz Freleng	LT
11	Bully for Bugs		1953	Chuck Jones	LT
12	Ballot Box Bunny	Sam	1951	Friz Freleng	MM
13	Rabbit Seasoning	Daffy, Elmer	1952	Chuck Jones	MM
14	Rabbit's Kin	Pete Puma	1952	Robert McKimson	MM
15	Broom-Stick Bunny	Witch Hazel	1956	Chuck Jones	LT

=== Notes ===
- In the Region 2 release, "Rabbit Fire", "Baton Bunny", "Rabbit of Seville" and "Big Top Bunny" are replaced respectively by "Buckaroo Bugs", "Hurdy-Gurdy Hare", "Hare Tonic" and "Acrobatty Bunny". These shorts too were already released in the Golden Collection series.
- This is the only Looney Tunes Super Stars DVD set that is unavailable in Region 1, instead it is only available in Regions 2 and 4.

== Road Runner & Wile E. Coyote: Supergenius Hijinks ==
Road Runner & Wile E. Coyote: Supergenius Hijinks
- Directed by: Chuck Jones, Rudy Larriva, Robert McKimson, Spike Brandt, Bret Haaland, Matthew O'Callaghan
- Starring: Wile E. Coyote and Road Runner
- Distributed by: Warner Home Video
- Release date: October 4, 2011 (United States)
- Running time: 125 minutes
- Country: United States
- Language: English

Looney Tunes Super Stars' Road Runner & Wile E. Coyote: Supergenius Hijinks was released on October 4, 2011. although it was released a day earlier at Walmart stores. It was first released in the Czech Republic on September 8, 2011 and as Road Runner & Friends in the United Kingdom on July 4, 2011, although the UK release excludes the CGI-animated shorts.

All cartoons on this disc feature Road Runner and Wile E. Coyote.

#	Title	Year	Director	Series
1	Coyote Falls	2010	Matthew O'Callaghan	LT
2	Fur of Flying	2010	Matthew O'Callaghan	LT
3	Rabid Rider	2010	Matthew O'Callaghan	LT
4	Whizzard of Ow	2003	Bret Haaland	LT
5	Chariots of Fur	1994	Chuck Jones	LT
6	Little Go Beep	2000	Spike Brandt	LT
7	Sugar and Spies	1966	Robert McKimson	LT
8	Clippety Clobbered	1966	Rudy Larriva	LT
9	The Solid Tin Coyote	1966	Rudy Larriva	LT
10	Out and Out Rout	1966	Rudy Larriva	MM
11	Shot and Bothered	1966	Rudy Larriva	LT
12	Chaser on the Rocks	1965	Rudy Larriva	MM
13	Highway Runnery	1965	Rudy Larriva	LT
14	Boulder Wham!	1965	Rudy Larriva	MM
15	Hairied and Hurried	1965	Rudy Larriva	MM

== Pepé Le Pew: Zee Best of Zee Best ==
Pepė Le Pew: Zee Best of Zee Best
- Directed by: Chuck Jones, Arthur Davis, Friz Freleng, Abe Levitow
- Produced by: Eddie Selzer, John W. Burton, David H. DePatie
- Starring: Mel Blanc (voice)
- Distributed by: Warner Home Video
- Release date: December 27, 2011 (United States)
- Running time: 119 minutes
- Country: United States
- Language: English

Looney Tunes Super Stars' Pepé Le Pew: Zee Best of Zee Best was released on December 27, 2011. The pre-53 shorts are presented in full screen while the post-53 shorts have both widescreen and full screen options (except for 1956's "Heaven Scent" which is only available in full screen). This was also the last Looney Tunes Super Stars series to feature a matted 1:85 widescreen format option for the post-1953 shorts and one of the few Warner Bros. home media release to feature the entire filmography of a major Looney Tunes character.

All cartoons on this disc feature Pepé Le Pew.

#	Title	Co-stars	Year	Director	Series
1	Odor-able Kitty*	Claude	1945	Chuck Jones	LT
2	Scent-imental Over You		1947	Chuck Jones	LT
3	Odor of the Day	Wellington	1948	Arthur Davis	LT
4	For Scent-imental Reasons*	Penelope	1949	Chuck Jones	LT
5	Scent-imental Romeo	Penelope	1951	Chuck Jones	MM
6	Little Beau Pepé	Penelope	1952	Chuck Jones	MM
7	Wild Over You		1953	Chuck Jones	LT
8	Dog Pounded	Sylvester, Tweety	1954	Friz Freleng	LT
9	The Cats Bah	Penelope	1954	Chuck Jones	LT
10	Past Perfumance	Penelope	1955	Chuck Jones	MM
11	Two Scent's Worth	Penelope	1955	Chuck Jones	MM
12	Heaven Scent*	Penelope	1956	Chuck Jones	MM
13	Touché and Go	Penelope	1957	Chuck Jones	MM
14	Really Scent	Penelope	1959	Abe Levitow	MM
15	Who Scent You?	Penelope	1960	Chuck Jones	LT
16	A Scent of the Matterhorn	Penelope	1961	Chuck Jones	LT
17	Louvre Come Back to Me!	Penelope	1962	Chuck Jones	LT

(*) Have been released on the Golden Collection DVD set

== Porky & Friends: Hilarious Ham ==
Porky & Friends: Hilarious Ham
- Directed by: Robert McKimson, Arthur Davis, Friz Freleng, Bob Clampett, Chuck Jones, Irv Spector
- Produced by: Leon Schlesinger, Eddie Selzer, John W. Burton, David H. DePatie, William L. Hendricks
- Starring: Mel Blanc (voice)
- Distributed by: Warner Home Video
- Release date: November 6, 2012 (United States)
- Running time: 126 minutes
- Country: United States
- Language: English

Looney Tunes Super Stars' Porky & Friends: Hilarious Ham was released on November 6, 2012. This was the first DVD in the Super Stars series to present the post-1953 cartoons in original fullscreen format only, with no matted 1:85 widescreen format option.

#	Title	Characters	Year	Director	Series
1	Tom Turk and Daffy	Daffy, Porky	1944	Chuck Jones	LT
2	Wagon Heels*	Porky	1945	Bob Clampett	MM
3	Mouse Menace	Porky	1946	Arthur Davis	LT
4	One Meat Brawl	Barnyard, Porky	1947	Robert McKimson	MM
5	Curtain Razor	Porky	1949	Friz Freleng	LT
6	The Pest That Came to Dinner	Porky	1948	Arthur Davis	LT
7	Riff Raffy Daffy	Daffy, Porky	1948	Arthur Davis	LT
8	Boobs in the Woods*	Daffy, Porky	1950	Robert McKimson	LT
9	Dog Collared	Porky	1950	Robert McKimson	MM
10	Thumb Fun	Daffy, Porky	1952	Robert McKimson	LT
11	Fool Coverage	Daffy, Porky	1952	Robert McKimson	LT
12	Corn on the Cop	Daffy, Granny, Porky	1965	Irv Spector	MM
13	Corn Plastered		1951	Robert McKimson	MM
14	Gone Batty	Bobo	1954	Robert McKimson	LT
15	Ant Pasted	Elmer	1953	Friz Freleng	LT
16	Dog Gone People	Elmer	1960	Robert McKimson	MM
17	Bunny and Claude (We Rob Carrot Patches)	Bunny and Claude	1968	Robert McKimson	LT
18	The Great Carrot Train Robbery	Bunny and Claude	1969	Robert McKimson	MM

(*) Have been released on the Golden Collection DVD set

=== Notes ===
- According to Jerry Beck, the reason the two Bunny and Claude cartoons were included on the DVD was for filler.
- While the set claims that all the cartoons on the set are "remastered for the first time into pristine, first-run condition," Wagon Heels and Boobs in the Woods were previously released restored on the Looney Tunes Golden Collection: Volume 5 DVD and the Looney Tunes Golden Collection: Volume 1 DVD, respectively. In addition, One Meat Brawl uses an unrestored USA 1995 dubbed version transfer and Ant Pasted uses the 1998 dubbed version transfer, hence the cue marks at the iris out and the closing of the rings. A restored version of One Meat Brawl was released on Looney Tunes Collector's Choice: Volume 2 Blu-ray.
- On the back of the DVD, photos of Tick Tock Tuckered, Daffy Doodles, and Nothing but the Tooth are shown—however, these cartoon aren't actually included on the DVD. Tick Tock Tuckered was released on Looney Tunes Super Stars' Daffy Duck: Frustrated Fowl. Daffy Doodles appears as an extra on the DVD of the Warner Bros. movie My Reputation, using the 1995 USA dubbed version transfer, and was later released in a restored form on the Looney Tunes Collector's Choice: Volume 1 Blu-ray; Nothing but the Tooth was released on the Looney Tunes Collector's Vault: Volume 3 Blu-ray.
- The PAL version of the DVD includes One Meat Brawl with the red borders at the opening titles as it was sourced from the 1995 PAL Dubbed Version print.
- Ant Pasted 1953 English audiotrack on PAL DVD release is played with low-pitched audio.

== Sylvester & Hippety Hopper: Marsupial Mayhem ==
Sylvester & Hippety Hopper: Marsupial Mayhem
- Directed by: Robert McKimson, Friz Freleng
- Produced by: Edward Selzer, John W. Burton, David H. DePatie
- Starring: Mel Blanc (voice)
- Distributed by: Warner Home Video
- Release date: April 23, 2013 (United States)
- Running time: 120 minutes
- Country: United States
- Language: English

Looney Tunes Super Stars' Sylvester & Hippety Hopper: Marsupial Mayhem is a DVD featuring 18 newly remastered cartoons. It is the final release in the Super Star series, due to poor sales of Looney Tunes Platinum Collection: Volume 2 and the depletion of the remastering budget for new-to-DVD Looney Tunes shorts. This release features all 18 of Sylvester's pairings with Hippety Hopper and/or his son, Sylvester Jr. The DVD was released on April 23, 2013.

All cartoons in this collection star Sylvester, and co-star either Hippety Hopper and/or Sylvester Jr. All are directed by Robert McKimson, except for Goldimouse and the Three Cats, which was directed by Friz Freleng.

#	Title	Co-Starring	Year	Director	Series
1	Hop, Look and Listen	Hippety Hopper	1948	Robert McKimson	LT
2	Hippety Hopper	Hippety Hopper	1949	Robert McKimson	MM
3	Pop 'Im Pop!	Hippety Hopper, Sylvester Jr.	1950	Robert McKimson	LT
4	Who's Kitten Who?	Hippety Hopper, Sylvester Jr.	1952	Robert McKimson	LT
5	Hoppy-Go-Lucky	Hippety Hopper	1952	Robert McKimson	LT
6	Cats A-Weigh!	Hippety Hopper, Sylvester Jr.	1953	Robert McKimson	MM
7	Bell Hoppy	Hippety Hopper	1954	Robert McKimson	MM
8	Lighthouse Mouse	Hippety Hopper	1955	Robert McKimson	MM
9	Too Hop to Handle	Hippety Hopper, Sylvester Jr.	1956	Robert McKimson	LT
10	The Slap-Hoppy Mouse	Hippety Hopper, Sylvester Jr.	1956	Robert McKimson	MM
11	Mouse-Taken Identity	Hippety Hopper, Sylvester Jr.	1957	Robert McKimson	MM
12	Hoppy Daze	Hippety Hopper	1961	Robert McKimson	LT
13	Freudy Cat	Hippety Hopper, Sylvester Jr.	1964	Robert McKimson	LT
14	Cat's Paw	Sylvester Jr.	1959	Robert McKimson	LT
15	Fish and Slips	Sylvester Jr.	1962	Robert McKimson	LT
16	Birds of a Father	Sylvester Jr.	1961	Robert McKimson	LT
17	Claws in the Lease	Sylvester Jr.	1963	Robert McKimson	MM
18	Goldimouse and the Three Cats*	Sylvester Jr.	1960	Friz Freleng	LT

(*) Have been released on the Golden Collection DVD set

== Reception ==
The first two Looney Tunes Super Stars sets (Bugs Bunny: Hare Extraordinaire and Daffy Duck: Frustrated Fowl) had released the majority the cartoons from the post-1953 era in a 1:85 widescreen format. Warner Bros. has stated the reason for this was because that is how the post-1953 cartoons were shown in theaters, though the cartoons were filmed in Academy ratio, not widescreen at that time. On December 1, 2010, animation expert Jerry Beck explained on the Shokus Internet Radio call-in talk program, Stu's Show that Warner aimed this series, not at collectors, but at the mass market who expect it to fit on their widescreen TVs. He speculated that at some point down the road there would probably be a double-dip release of those shorts in a collector's DVD version with the video in full-frame format. However, the Foghorn Leghorn DVD includes both the widescreen and the Academy ratio of the cartoons on the same disc and further releases provide only fullscreen viewing.

On the Tweety and Sylvester: Feline Fwenzy and Bugs Bunny: Wascally Wabbit DVDs, all of the cartoons have been released previously on the Golden Collection series, much to the disappointment of fans.

With the Road Runner and Wile E. Coyote: Supergenius Hijinks DVD, some collectors were disappointed that the set focused on the less well-received DFE-era Coyote/Road Runner cartoons (particularly the Rudy Larriva-directed ones) and lacked Chuck Jones' Coyote/Road Runner cartoons from the pre-1964 "classic" era.
