= Tweetie Pie =

1947 short film by Bob Clampett and Friz Freleng

- Blue Ribbon rerelease title card
- Directed by: I. Freleng
- Story by: Tedd Pierce; Michael Maltese
- Starring: Mel Blanc; Bea Benaderet
- Music by: Carl Stalling
- Animation by: Gerry Chiniquy; Manuel Perez; Ken Champin; Virgil Ross
- Layouts by: Hawley Pratt
- Backgrounds by: Terry Lind
- Color process: Technicolor
- Production company: Warner Bros. Cartoons
- Distributed by: Warner Bros. Pictures
- Release dates: May 3, 1947 (original); June 25, 1955 (Blue Ribbon re-release)
- Running time: 7:02
- Language: English

Tweetie Pie is a 1947 Warner Bros. Merrie Melodies cartoon directed by Friz Freleng. The short was released on May 3, 1947, and stars Tweety with Sylvester, who is called "Thomas" in this cartoon.

Tweetie Pie marks the first pairing of the characters Sylvester and Tweety, and it won the Academy Award for Best Animated Short Film in 1947 therefore breaking Tom and Jerry's streak of four consecutive wins in the category and winning Warner Bros. Cartoons their first Academy Award.

== Plot ==
Thomas attacks Tweety, whom he finds outside in the snow, warming himself by a lit cigar. The cat's mistress, whose face is never shown, saves the bird from being eaten by the cat, whom she promptly reprimands.

Tweety is brought inside, and the mistress warns Thomas not to bother the bird. Ignoring this command, Thomas initiates a series of attempts to get Tweety from his cage such as stacking up furniture and tables as a ladder, each ending in a noisy crash thanks to Tweety foiling his plans to eat him, bringing the mistress to whack Thomas with a broom every time.

Next, Thomas uses the table fan as a propeller to fly himself upwards Tweety's cage, but Tweety immediately unplugs the fan, causing Thomas to fall down on the floor hard.

Afterwards, when Thomas tries using a fishing line to raise himself up to grab Tweety, Tweety immediately yells for help at the noisiest volume to alert the mistress, causing Thomas to panic, lower himself back to the ground, and fake being asleep to fool her.

When she doesn't respond, incensed, Thomas ambushes Tweety while he's singing a little song to himself trapping him in a soundproof glass cup. Thomas thinks he got one over on Tweety as he smiles smugly, but when he looks back at Tweety, his smug smile changes to a horrified look as Tweety intends to prick his palm with a pin to force him to release him. Thomas frantically shakes his head in panic, but Tweety, in self-defense, does it anyway, sending Thomas shooting towards the ceiling with a drawn-out pained shout of "YEOW!!!", allowing Tweety to make enough of a racket to alert the mistress, who this time hears him and catches Thomas red-handed as he frantically pleads for Tweety to stop.

The mistress, who has finally had enough of Thomas ignoring her commands to stop eating Tweety, throws him out into the cold as punishment after whacking him with her broom once more.

The cat tries to sneak back into the house through the chimney. Seeing this, Tweety puts wood in the fireplace, pours gasoline on it and lights it. The explosion sends Thomas flying right back up the chimney and into a bucket of frozen water.

However, Thomas gets back in the house via a window in the basement and creates a Rube Goldberg-esque trap to capture Tweety, which of course, backfires and injures him instead. Out of frustration, Thomas ends up ripping the blueprints he used for the Goldberg-esque trap.

Finally, he tries to capture Tweety by running up to the attic and sawing a hole around Tweety's cage, but he ends up causing the entire inner ceiling to collapse (sans Tweety's cage, which is being held in place by a beam). The faux pas creates such a racket and a mess that Thomas is sure the mistress will come downstairs and wallop him again (and possibly throw him out again for good). In a desperate attempt to avoid this, he takes her broom, breaks it in half, and tosses the pieces into the lit fireplace. This proves to be a bad move, as he then suddenly finds himself being walloped repeatedly with a shovel... by Tweety, who calls him a "bad ol' puddy tat!".

== Production ==
In 1945, Bob Clampett, the original creator of Tweety, conceived the idea for a fourth cartoon in which he is paired with Friz Freleng's Sylvester the Cat. This proposed cartoon, tentatively titled Fat Rat and the Stupid Cat, aimed to be the first collaboration between Sylvester and Tweety. However, Clampett's departure from Warner Bros. in May led to the cancellation of the project during pre-production. His final Tweety cartoon, A Gruesome Twosome, was released a month later. Meanwhile, Freleng took a liking to Clampett's bird character, but would redesign Tweety with a coat of yellow feathers, and smaller feet. The production of Tweetie Pie would begin in June 1945.

According to the documentary Friz on Film, producer Edward Selzer initially prevented Freleng from using Tweety for his new short, as he felt that pairing him with Sylvester was impractical. Instead he insisted that Freleng use the woodpecker from Peck Up Your Troubles, thinking he was it was a better adversary. Freleng's insistence on using Tweety led to a confrontation in which he threatened Selzer to make the cartoon himself before storming back home. Selzer eventually relented later that night, allowing the collaboration. The resulting film earned Warner Bros. Cartoons its first Oscar, an accolade initially accepted by Selzer and later inherited by Freleng after Selzer's passing in 1970.

This successful pairing cemented Tweety and Sylvester as a popular duo, ensuring their continued partnership in subsequent appearances due to their substantial star power. However, Sylvester also featured in numerous shorts without Tweety, notably in the Hippety Hopper series alongside Sylvester Jr., directed by Robert McKimson. Additionally, Sylvester appeared alongside Speedy Gonzales in cartoons supervised by both Freleng and McKimson, earning another Oscar in 1955 for their collaboration.

== Home media ==
Although the cartoon was re-released into the Blue Ribbon program in 1955, the cartoon's original titles are known to exist. When re-released, like most Merrie Melodies at the time, the original ending bullet titles were kept. On the following sets, the Blue Ribbon re-release print is available. The original titles were found on a black-and-white print in 2011, but all future releases still had the Blue Ribbon titles as Warner Bros. does not restore black-and-white prints.

- VHS – The Best Of Bugs Bunny and Friends
- VHS – Little Tweety and Little Inki Cartoon Festival featuring "I Taw a Putty Tat"
- VHS – Tweety and Sylvester
- VHS – The Golden Age Of Looney Tunes Volume 6: Friz Freleng
- VHS – Looney Tunes Collectors Edition Volume 15: A Battle Of Wits
- Laserdisc – The Golden Age of Looney Tunes Volume 1, Side 6
- DVD – Looney Tunes Golden Collection: Volume 2, Disc 3
- DVD – Warner Bros. Home Entertainment Academy Awards Animation Collection, Disc 1
- DVD – Looney Tunes Super Stars' Tweety & Sylvester: Feline Fwenzy
- Blu-ray – Looney Tunes Platinum Collection: Volume 1, Disc 1

== See also ==
- Gift Wrapped, a similar cartoon where Sylvester tries to eat Tweety on a snowy day with their owner trying to stop the latter, except being more Christmas-themed.
- Sylvester the Cat filmography
- Looney Tunes and Merrie Melodies filmography (1940–1949)
