= Little Red Rodent Hood =

- Directed by: I. Freleng
- Story by: Warren Foster
- Starring: Mel Blanc
- Music by: Carl Stalling
- Animation by: Arthur Davis; Manuel Perez; Ken Champin; Virgil Ross
- Layouts by: Hawley Pratt
- Backgrounds by: Irv Wyner
- Color process: Technicolor
- Production company: Warner Bros. Cartoons
- Distributed by: Warner Bros. Pictures; The Vitaphone Corporation
- Release date: May 3, 1952 (USA)
- Running time: 6 minutes
- Language: English

Little Red Rodent Hood is a 1952 Warner Bros. Merrie Melodies animated short directed by Friz Freleng. The short was released on May 3, 1952, and stars Sylvester in a spoof of Little Red Riding Hood.

== Plot ==
A little mouse asks her grandmother to tell her a bedtime story. The old woman tells the story of Little Red Riding Hood, with her granddaughter as the protagonist. Little Red Riding Hood, on her way to her grandmother's house, is chased by Sylvester, disguised as the Big Bad Wolf, who takes a shortcut to get there before the little girl. Sylvester chases the other cats out of bed, then dresses up as her grandmother. When Little Red Riding Hood arrives, she begins to list the things that are wrong with "grandmother," until she notices her large teeth. Sylvester declares that they are "the better to eat you," thus initiating a chase. Thanks to her cunning, Little Red Riding Hood manages to throw Sylvester out of the house. The cat then tries to kill Little Red Riding Hood in two ways, but in both cases, Hector the Bulldog ensures that the whole thing backfires on Sylvester. When the latter manages to capture Little Red Riding Hood, she builds a miniature tank, which she uses to shoot Sylvester, who chases her, trapping her in the hole, at which point the short returns to reality. The little mouse then asks her grandmother what happened to Little Red Riding Hood; the old woman explains that she found a firecracker leftover from the 4th of July and, after lighting the fuse, threw the firecracker at Sylvester, demonstrating to her granddaughter. The little mouse states that she is sure she blew Sylvester up, to which the cat, singed by the firecracker, agrees (ultimately indicating that the story actually happened).

== Home media ==
DVD:

- Looney Tunes Golden Collection: Volume 5

Blu-ray/DVD:

- Looney Tunes Platinum Collection: Volume 2

== See also ==
- List of cartoons featuring Sylvester
