= Bad Ol' Putty Tat =

- Title card
- Directed by: I. Freleng
- Story by: Tedd Pierce
- Starring: Mel Blanc
- Music by: Carl Stalling
- Animation by: Gerry Chiniquy; Manuel Perez; Virgil Ross; Ken Champin
- Layouts by: Hawley Pratt
- Backgrounds by: Paul Julian
- Color process: Technicolor
- Production company: Warner Bros. Cartoons
- Distributed by: Warner Bros. Pictures; The Vitaphone Corporation
- Release dates: July 23, 1949 (Original); June 29, 1957 (Blue Ribbon Reissue)
- Running time: 7:02
- Country: United States
- Language: English

Bad Ol' Putty Tat is a 1949 Warner Bros. Merrie Melodies animated cartoon short directed by Friz Freleng. The short was released on July 23, 1949, and stars Tweety and Sylvester.

Tweety must evade the titular "puddy tat", Sylvester, who is once again in hot pursuit of Tweety, just so that he can eat him for his own personal snack. This cartoon is somewhat of an anomaly in the Sylvester & Tweety pairings in that Tweety provides almost all the dialogue, and then mainly to the audience. Tweety's voice is performed by Mel Blanc, who also screams out Sylvester's pain mid-film. The story was written by Tedd Pierce; he and fellow Warner Bros. cartoon writer Michael Maltese appear in caricature form as a pair of badminton players.

== Plot ==
The film begins with a shot of Tweety's house, at the top of a tall wooden pole, with a Do not disturb sign. There is barbed wire wound around the pole and, on the ground at the bottom, a barbed wire damaged Sylvester, glaring angrily back up at Tweety's house following his off-camera failed attempt to get at Tweety leading to his current injured appearance.

Sylvester builds a trampoline and launches himself to the entrance of the birdhouse; Tweety fights back with various weapons and, ultimately, a stick of dynamite. Next, Sylvester begins sawing the pole. To escape, Tweety pins himself to a clothesline and begins sliding down it; at the last minute, he sees the cat with the end of the line tied to his tooth and his mouth open, awaiting Tweety. When the line collapses, Sylvester sees the bird has attached the other end to a firework, which he lights and launches, taking Sylvester's teeth with it.

Sylvester paints his finger to look like a female Tweety. At first, this works, but Tweety discovers the ploy and switches hats with "her". This results in Sylvester chomping down on his finger.

Tweety accidentally becomes the badminton birdie in a spontaneous match. The cat manages to take one player's place and, again, awaits the bird with his mouth open. Tweety drops a stick of dynamite, which travels right into Sylvester's stomach. He rushes to a water cooler and, as he's drinking in order to put out the fire, the explosion pilots him into the cooler.

Finally, he builds a new birdhouse, puts it over his head (the entrance being located at mouth-level) and climbs to the top of a pole, hoping to attract Tweety inside. Tweety, having frightened himself with thoughts of Sylvester, does fly into the cat's mouth. Instead of being digested, he takes manual control of Sylvester, turning him into a train which crashes into a brick wall. Tweety then says fourth wall, "You know, I woes no puddy tats that way?" and smiles.

== Home media ==
Bad Ol' Putty Tat is available on the Looney Tunes Golden Collection: Volume 2 and Looney Tunes Super Stars' Tweety & Sylvester: Feline Fwenzy.

== See also ==
- Sylvester the Cat filmography
- Looney Tunes and Merrie Melodies filmography (1940–1949)
