= Tom Tom Tomcat =

- Directed by: I. Freleng
- Story by: Warren Foster
- Starring: Mel Blanc; Bea Benaderet (Latter Uncredited)
- Music by: Carl Stalling
- Animation by: Ken Champin; Virgil Ross; Arthur Davis; Manuel Perez
- Layouts by: Hawley Pratt
- Backgrounds by: Irv Wyner
- Color process: Technicolor
- Production company: Warner Bros. Cartoons
- Distributed by: Warner Bros. Pictures; The Vitaphone Corporation
- Release date: June 27, 1953
- Running time: 6:29
- Language: English

Tom Tom Tomcat is a 1953 Warner Bros. Merrie Melodies animated short directed by Friz Freleng. The short was released on June 27, 1953, and stars Tweety and Sylvester.

== Plot ==
In the Wild West, Granny and Tweety are riding through the desert in their wagon, singing Oh! Susanna, when they are suddenly ambushed by a large group of "puddy tats" posing as Indigenous peoples of the Americas – many of whom appear to be clones of Sylvester. They flee to a deserted fort, where Granny begins to shoot them down while Tweety uses tally marks to keep track of how many natives have been beaten, singing Ten Little Indians. The tenth one nearly takes Tweety away, but he is struck down by Granny just in time.

More attempts include an archer and a battering ram, both foiled. Another archer almost drags Tweety out again ("Granny! Help! A Mohican got me!"), but Granny surprises him with a bomb instead. The cats' attempts continue like this, all of them backfiring or being foiled. In one instance, Chief "Rain-In-The-P-P-Puss" orders the real Sylvester to sneak into the fort, but Sylvester emerges later with the top of his head having been scalped off by Granny ("Ya got any more bright ideas?").

Finally, Granny and Tweety disguise themselves as fellow Native Americans and lead the cats into the powder house. When one of them (named Geronimo) asks for a match, they kindly oblige, and the powder house explodes, causing all the cats to erupt into the sky and then fall. Holding an umbrella, Tweety comments: "Oh my goodness, it's raining puddy tats!"

== See also ==
- List of cartoons featuring Sylvester
