= D' Fightin' Ones =

- Directed by: Friz Freleng
- Starring: Mel Blanc
- Edited by: Treg Brown
- Music by: Milt Franklyn
- Animation by: Gerry Chiniquy; Arthur Davis; Virgil Ross; Harry Love
- Layouts by: Hawley Pratt
- Backgrounds by: Tom O'Loughlin
- Color process: Technicolor
- Production company: Warner Bros. Cartoons
- Distributed by: Warner Bros. Pictures
- Release date: April 22, 1961
- Running time: 6 minutes
- Language: English

D' Fightin' Ones is a 1961 Warner Bros. Merrie Melodies cartoon directed by Friz Freleng. The short was released on April 22, 1961, and stars Sylvester and Hector. It is a parody of the 1958 film The Defiant Ones, a film about two escaped inmates—one black, one white—who are shackled to each other.

== Plot ==
Sylvester and Hector (a dog) are on a truck headed for the pound. Both are shackled to each other and hate each other's guts. After a little scuffle, the truck hits a bumpy road, causing the back door to open, and dumping Sylvester and Hector out. Just as the truck stops and turns around to pick them up, the two quickly run for cover, which is easier said than done due to being stuck together.

After fighting over some food, Sylvester and Hector realize the first thing they must do is get the chains off. However, attempting to blow up the chains with TNT and chiseling them apart both fail. Later, while walking near railroad tracks, they escape an approaching train, but not the caboose; it snags their chain and soon leaves them dangling on a water silo. That night, the two sneak into the city and see animal control personnel heading their way; the two quickly take brief refuge in a shed and avoid the spotlights. After avoiding the spotlight, the only thing they can do now is flee the city, but they need to avoid detection from animal control personnel; Sylvester and Hector take turns disguising themselves in human clothes while the other animal hides in a suitcase. As soon as the two reach the bus station, they try to hop aboard a bus out of town, but quickly hightail it out of there when they find that their bus is revealed to be headed for Sing Sing.

In the final set piece of the cartoon, it would seem the situation is hopeless, but then, Hector spotted an approaching train and gets an idea: they hang below a train trestle that goes between two mountains, and once the train runs over their chains, it will cut them free. However, both realize too late it's a bad idea when Sylvester points downward, indicating that once the chains are broken, they'll fall hundreds of feet to the ground. Sure enough, Sylvester and Hector fall into a junkyard after the train cuts their chains. At first, both continue to argue about how dumb the plan was, but are joyous when they realize they aren't shackled together anymore, their joy is short-lived when they look down and notice they're now connected by leg via a pipe. They hear police sirens coming their way and hop down the road to escape as the short ends.

== Home media ==
This short is available on the Looney Tunes Collector's Choice: Volume 4 Blu-ray.

== See also ==
- List of cartoons featuring Sylvester
