= Peck Up Your Troubles =

1945 film by Friz Freleng

- Directed by: I. Freleng
- Story by: Michael Maltese
- Music by: Carl W. Stalling
- Animation by: Virgil Ross; Gerry Chiniquy; Manuel Perez; Ken Champin
- Layouts by: Hawley Pratt
- Backgrounds by: Paul Julian
- Production company: Warner Bros. Cartoons
- Distributed by: Warner Bros. Pictures; The Vitaphone Corporation
- Release date: October 20, 1945
- Running time: 7:11
- Country: United States
- Language: English

Peck Up Your Troubles is a 1945 Warner Bros. Merrie Melodies animated short directed by Friz Freleng. The short was released on October 20, 1945, and stars Sylvester the Cat.

The cartoon marked the first appearance of Sylvester's long-time foe Hector the Bulldog, who would later become a recurring character in Tweety and Sylvester cartoons. The woodpecker would later reappear in A Peck o' Trouble, a Dodsworth Cat cartoon directed by Robert McKimson in 1953.

== Plot ==
Sylvester is determined to get a male woodpecker that just moved in, high in a tree. He climbs, but the bird greases the tree, causing him to fall down; he starts to chop it down, but a mean dog (Hector, in his first appearance, though identified here on the doghouse as "Rover") stops him from cutting it (this becomes a running gag). Several other attempts follow; at one point, he puts his paw into the bird's home, and the bird puts a tomato there.

Sylvester squishes it, thinking he killed him. The bird dresses as an angel to torment the remorseful cat, handing him a revolver to kill himself but Sylvester sees through the disguise and unsuccessfully opens fire on the woodpecker. Few more attempts passed and finally, Sylvester tries to blow up the tree; the dog again intervenes. Sylvester gets the dynamite off the tree and puts out the fuses, but the bird has lit them again. Sylvester dies and really becomes an angel.

== Home media ==
This short is available on the Looney Tunes Collector's Choice: Volume 4 Blu-ray.

== See also ==
- List of films about angels
- Sylvester the Cat filmography
- Looney Tunes and Merrie Melodies filmography (1940–1949)
