= Back Alley Oproar =

- Original title card
- Directed by: I. Freleng
- Story by: Michael Maltese; Tedd Pierce
- Starring: Mel Blanc; Gloria Curran (singing cat, uncredited); Arthur Q. Bryan (Elmer Fudd, uncredited)
- Music by: Carl Stalling
- Animation by: Gerry Chiniquy; Manuel Perez; Ken Champin; Virgil Ross
- Layouts by: Hawley Pratt
- Backgrounds by: Paul Julian
- Color process: Technicolor
- Production company: Warner Bros. Cartoons
- Distributed by: Warner Bros. Pictures
- Release date: March 27, 1948
- Running time: 7:40
- Language: English

Back Alley Oproar is a Warner Bros. Merrie Melodies animated short directed by Friz Freleng. The short was released on March 27, 1948, and features Sylvester and Elmer Fudd. The title is a play on "uproar" and "opera". This is a rare exception for Sylvester as he wins in this cartoon. It is a remake of Freleng's Notes to You (1941), which itself would be remade in Le Quiet Squad, a short in DePatie-Freleng Enterprises' The Inspector series of shorts, of which Freleng served as a producer on all entries.

== Plot ==
Sylvester does a wild musical number of "Angel in Disguise" in Elmer's backyard inspired by Spike Jones.

Elmer is ready for bed, but Sylvester has other plans as he starts singing in Elmer's backyard - an exaggeration of common cat-howling disturbances. A series of gags play out, as Elmer tries everything up his sleeve to get rid of the pest. He eventually confronts Sylvester, but before Elmer can blast him with his shotgun, Sylvester sings a sweet, gentle lullaby to ease him into a deep sleep, even managing to tuck Elmer back into bed. However, the one-man band performance Sylvester subsequently puts on ensures this doesn't last.

Elmer finally reaches his breaking point and fetches a crate of dynamite to get rid of Sylvester once and for all. Just as he lights the fuse, the dynamite explodes instantly, killing them both. His spirit ends up in Heaven, on a cloud ascending into space. Momentarily, Elmer thinks he will finally get some peace and quiet, but his relief is short-lived as Sylvester's multiple spirits ascend and soar around him, singing the sextet from Lucia di Lammermoor, while one of them steals his halo. Unable to cope, Elmer dives off his cloud, and a crash is heard off-screen.

== Production ==
Back Alley Oproar is a remake of Notes to You (1941), a Looney Tunes short that was also directed by Freleng. It has a similar plot, although the ending of the original does not have the characters die from an explosion (instead, the cat gets shot, and returns as nine singing angels), and the roles of Elmer and Sylvester were taken by Porky Pig and an unnamed alley cat. Back Alley Oproar is one of the few entries in which Sylvester "wins out" over another character, albeit at the presumed cost of his life.

Back Alley Oproar was remade by Freleng in 1967 for The Inspector series as Le Quiet Squad.

== Reception ==
Greg Ford calls this cartoon "Sylvester's finest hour", writing, "Back Alley Oproar's Sylvester exudes enormous appeal as he tunefully harasses Fudd, his merry medley aided and abetted by Carl Stalling's score, Mel Blanc's virtuosic vocalizations, and Freling's A-list animation team, here led by song-and-dance impresario Gerry Chiniquy."

== Release ==
Back Alley Oproar was reissued with new Blue Ribbon opening titles and aired on television like this as well. The original title card was restored for the Looney Tunes Golden Collection: Volume 2 DVD and Looney Tunes Platinum Collection: Volume 2 Blu-ray, uncut and uncensored.

== See also ==
- Elmer Fudd filmography
- Sylvester the Cat filmography
- Looney Tunes and Merrie Melodies filmography (1940–1949)
