= Satan's Waitin' =

1954 film by Friz Freleng

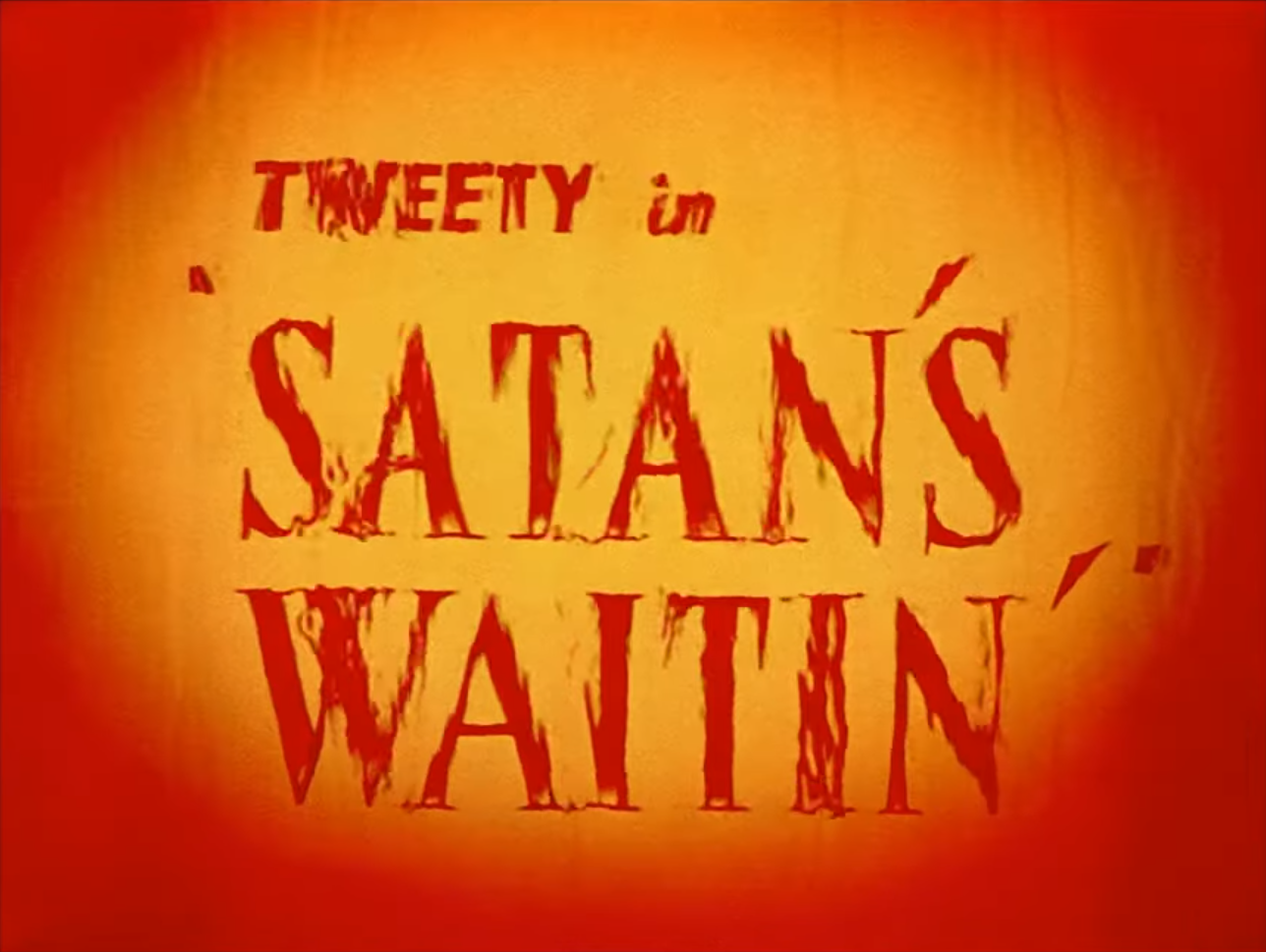
- Title card
- Directed by: I. Freleng
- Story by: Warren Foster
- Starring: Mel Blanc
- Music by: Carl Stalling
- Animation by: Virgil Ross; Arthur Davis; Manuel Perez; Ken Champin
- Layouts by: Hawley Pratt
- Backgrounds by: Irv Wyner
- Color process: Technicolor
- Production company: Warner Bros. Cartoons
- Distributed by: Warner Bros. Pictures; The Vitaphone Corporation
- Release date: August 7, 1954
- Running time: 7 minutes
- Language: English

Satan's Waitin' is a 1954 Warner Bros. Looney Tunes cartoon directed by Friz Freleng. The short was released on August 7, 1954, and stars Tweety and Sylvester.

A later short, Devil's Feud Cake (1963), was re-titled Satan's Waitin' when it was featured as part of The Looney Looney Looney Bugs Bunny Movie. The plot of Devil's Feud Cake closely follows this one, but features Bugs Bunny and Yosemite Sam.

In the film, Sylvester loses the first of his nine lives, and is then sent to hell. The local version of Satan goads him to continue his risky pursuit of Tweety, ensuring that Sylvester will lose the rest of his lives.

== Plot ==
Sylvester is in pursuit of Tweety, chasing him to the top of a building. Sylvester falls from the building (first he grabs some of Tweety's tail feathers to help him fly, but Tweety is able to take them back), crashes to the sidewalk and dies. The spirit of his first life approaches two escalators and takes the "down" (to Hell) one (since the one going "up" (to Heaven) is roped off) and ends up in Hell. He is greeted by a Satanic bulldog (Hector the Bulldog), who realizes he must goad Sylvester into giving up his remaining eight lives, so he asks life #1 to sit on a bench to wait for the others.

Sylvester wakes up and Tweety tells him he is in trouble for breaking the sidewalk (which cracked upon impact of his earlier fall). Sylvester has had enough of Tweety and tells him to get lost. The bulldog's spirit reminds him that he has eight lives left, so Sylvester starts the chase up again. He chases Tweety around a moving steamroller but gets flattened, sending life #2 through the street and into Hell. The flat #2 gets up and sits beside #1.

The chase then continues through an amusement park. They both run into a bulldog's-mouth entranceway to the fun house, but Sylvester steps back out, takes one look at the bulldog and is literally "frightened to death". A scared-white-as-a-ghost life #3 takes his place on the waiting bench; the cat recovers and finds Tweety amongst the moving targets in a shooting gallery. He climbs into the targets to get at his prey but is shot several times in rapid succession. With each shot (except the first two), lives 4 through 7 pop up on the bench. Sylvester bursts out of the gallery (narrowly missing another shot) and sees Tweety heading towards the roller coaster. As Tweety sits in the front seat proclaiming "That puddy tat will never find me here", the cat takes the seat directly behind him. The train ascends the lift hill and proceeds to go through the drops and turns. Near the end of the ride on a straight track, Sylvester stands up. Just as he is about to pummel an unsuspecting Tweety with a club, he slams into the entranceway of a tunnel. Upon impact, the train carrying life #8 in the front seat runs through the tunnel and down Hell's twisted escalator conveyor belt route that took Sylvester's first life down earlier.

Recovering, Sylvester realizes that he only has one life left and he got to learn to be more careful. The bulldog again goads him to go after Tweety, but Sylvester screams "No, no, no! I don't want him! I do-o-o-on't want him!" and runs off. After telling the bulldog he no longer wishes to pursue Tweety, he decides to secure his last life by moving into a bank vault with several cans of food, commenting that he will be safe in there and that nothing can happen to him. Later that night, two bank robbers (one named Mugsy) try to break into the safe using explosives, which Mugsy's cohort cautions him to not overdo it. Moments later, the explosives detonate, sending the two robbers on their own descent on the escalator to Hell, with the other robber stating "You used too much nitro, Mugsy!" The disgruntled life #9, Sylvester's last life, standing behind them, adds: "Now he tells him!"

== Reception ==
Yvette Kaplan writes, "Why hasn't Hollywood made a feature version of Satan's Waitin'? The premise is perfect! Cat dies while trying to catch cute but psychopathic Tweety Bird. Is sent to hell for sentencing. When it is discovered (due to technical error) that cat still has eight other lives to go, he is returned to Earth for another chance to catch Tweety-and eight more rounds of torment. Is that a recipe for a blockbuster or what?"

== Home media ==
This short was issued on the VHS Sylvester and Tweety's Tale Feathers. It is also available unedited and fully restored on Disc 1 of the Looney Tunes Golden Collection: Volume 6 DVD set, the Looney Tunes Super Stars' Tweety & Sylvester: Feline Fwenzy DVD, and Disc 2 of the Looney Tunes Platinum Collection: Volume 3 Blu-ray set, with the latter restored to HD quality.
