= I Taw a Putty Tat =

1948 short animated cartoon directed by Friz Freleng

- Original title card
- Directed by: I. Freleng
- Story by: Tedd Pierce
- Starring: Mel Blanc
- Music by: Carl Stalling
- Animation by: Virgil Ross; Gerry Chiniquy; Manuel Perez; Ken Champin
- Layouts by: Hawley Pratt
- Backgrounds by: Paul Julian
- Color process: In: Cinecolor (two-strip, original release); Print by: Technicolor (production, three-strip, reissue)
- Production company: Warner Bros. Cartoons
- Distributed by: Warner Bros. Pictures
- Release date: April 1, 1948
- Running time: 7 minutes (one reel)
- Language: English

I Taw a Putty Tat is a 1948 Warner Bros. Merrie Melodies animated cartoon directed by Friz Freleng. The short was released on April 1, 1948, and stars Tweety and Sylvester.

Both Tweety and Sylvester are voiced by Mel Blanc. The uncredited voice of the lady of the house (seen only from the neck down, as she talks on the phone) is Bea Benaderet.

This is the first film whose title included Tweety's speech-impaired term for a cat.

== Plot ==
Sylvester awaits the arrival of a new canary after the previous house bird has mysteriously disappeared (one of several such disappearances, according to stencils the cat keeps on a wall hidden by a curtain, confirmed by his "hiccup" of some yellow feathers). Upon the arrival of the bird, Sylvester pretends to play nice in order to abuse and eventually make a meal of the sadistic canary.

A series of violent visual gags ensues in which Tweety physically subdues the threatening cat by smoking him up, hitting him on the foot with a mallet, feeding him some alum and using his uvula as a punching bag.

A couple of racial or ethnic gags are included. Sylvester imitates a Swedish-sounding maid, in an imitation of radio comedian El Brendel, who feigns complaining about having to "clean out de bird cage." He reaches into the covered cage and grabs what he thinks is the bird. The canary whistles at him. The confused cat opens his fist to find a small bomb, which promptly explodes, charred the cat in "blackface" makeup. His voice pattern then changes to something sounding like "Rochester", when he utters, "Uh-oh, back to the kitchen, ah smell somethin' burnin'!" just before passing out in the doorway.

A more subtle gag occurs when Tweety, inside the cat's mouth, yells down its gullet. The answer comes back, "There's nobody here but us mice!", which is a reference to the Louis Jordan hit "Ain't Nobody Here but Us Chickens" (1946).

At the climax, Tweety has managed to trap Sylvester inside the birdcage, and has introduced a "wittle puddy dog" (rhymes with "puppy dog"; a not-so-little "pug dog", an angry bulldog - in his first appearance). Their deadly battle occurs under the wrap the bird has thrown over the cage.

The film ends with the lady of the house calling the pet shop again, this time ordering a new cat, while Tweety lounges in Sylvester's old bed. Overhearing the woman telling the pet shop that the cat will have a nice home here, Tweety reveals the silhouette of a cat now stencilled on the wall, and closes the cartoon with a comment to the camera, "Her don't know me very well, do her?" a variant on one of Red Skelton's catchphrases by his "Mean Widdle Kid" character from radio.

== Production ==
Bea Benaderet provided the voice of the housemistress but she did not get credit as with most voice actors at the studio, Mel Blanc being the exception. Amongst the musical quotations in the Carl Stalling film score (with or without lyrics accompanying them) are extracts from Singin' in the Bathtub, She Was an Acrobat's Daughter and Ain't We Got Fun.

The animators for the cartoon were Ken Champin, Gerry Chiniquy, Manuel Perez, Virgil Ross, and an uncredited Pete Burness. Paul Julian was the background artist, while Hawley Pratt was the layout artist.

== Home media ==
- Bugs Bunny: Superstar, Part 1 (1975), uncut, on Looney Tunes Golden Collection: Volume 4 and standalone DVD
- The Golden Age of Looney Tunes, Volume 4 Laserdisc set
- Romance on the High Seas (1948), edited
- Looney Tunes Collector's Vault: Volume 2 Blu-ray set

== See also ==
- Looney Tunes and Merrie Melodies filmography (1940–1949)
- Sylvester the Cat filmography
