= Hop, Look and Listen =

1948 film by Robert McKimson

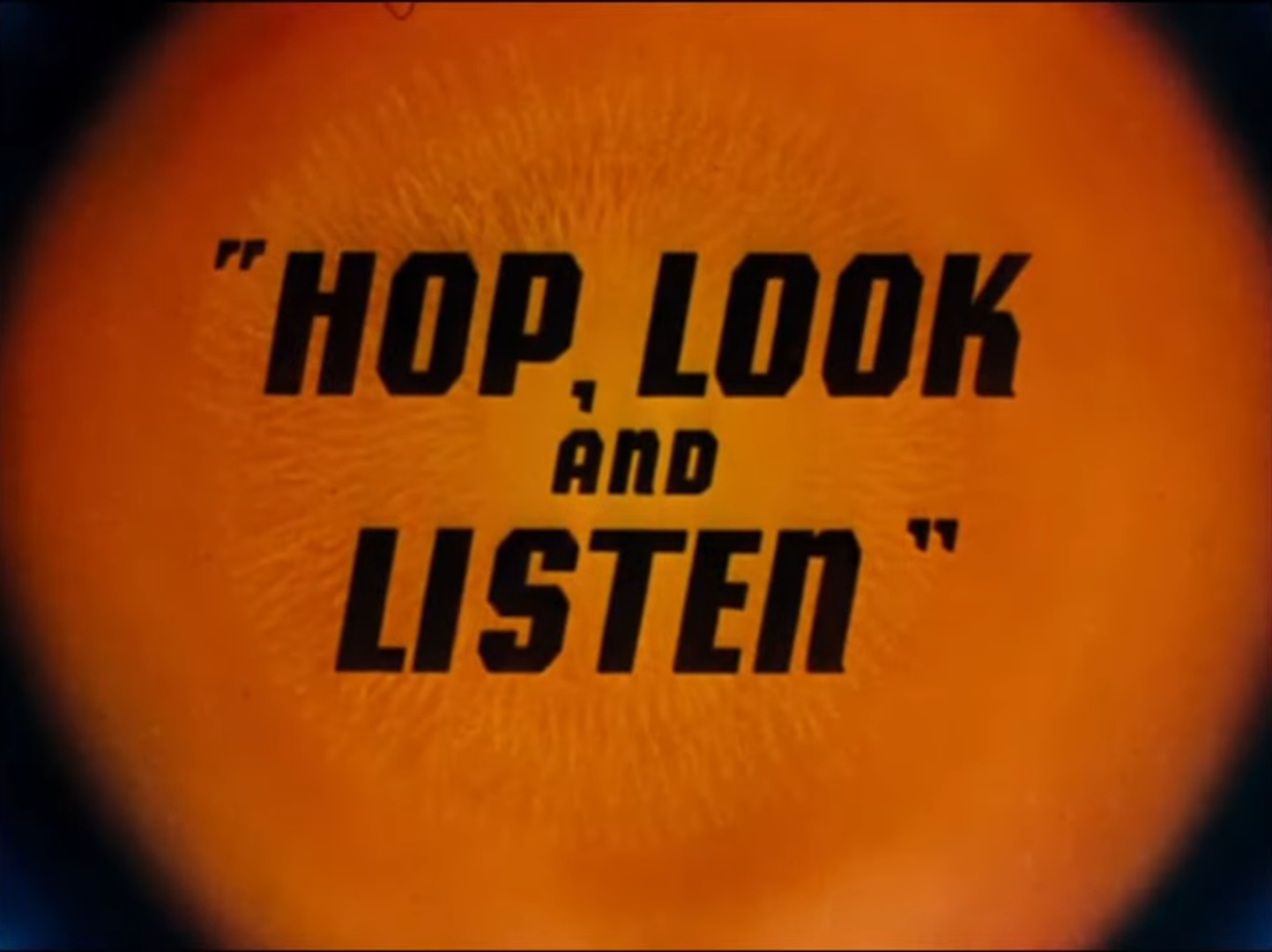
- Original title card
- Directed by: Robert McKimson
- Story by: Warren Foster
- Starring: Mel Blanc
- Music by: Carl Stalling
- Animation by: Charles McKimson; Manny Gould; I. Ellis
- Layouts by: Cornett Wood
- Backgrounds by: Richard H. Thomas
- Color process: Technicolor
- Production company: Warner Bros. Cartoons
- Distributed by: Warner Bros. Pictures
- Release date: April 17, 1948
- Running time: 7 minutes
- Language: English

Hop, Look and Listen is a 1948 Warner Bros. Looney Tunes cartoon directed by Robert McKimson. The short was released on April 17, 1948, and stars Sylvester and Hippety Hopper, in the latter's first appearance.

== Plot ==
Hippety Hopper escapes from a zoo, and when Sylvester first sees him, he believes that the kangaroo is actually a king-size mouse. A bulldog tries to convince the cat that there is no such thing, but when he too sees Hippety Hopper and his mother (who was searching for him), he and Sylvester hitch a ride on the water wagon.

== Home media ==
- Laserdisc - The Golden Age of Looney Tunes volume 2, side 9: Best Supporting Players
- DVD – Looney Tunes Super Stars' Sylvester and Hippety Hopper: Marsupial Mayhem

== Notes ==
- The cartoon was re-released into the Blue Ribbon Merrie Melodies program on June 4, 1955. Like most re-released cartoons at the time, the original closing bullet titles were kept. In 1995, Turner Entertainment restored the original titles of the short for its American and European Turner "dubbed" versions.
- This was the only Hippety Hopper cartoon whose copyrights were sold to Associated Artists Productions in 1956. They closed in 1958 and their assets were bought by United Artists. United Artists renewed the copyright in 1975. In 1981, Metro-Goldwyn-Mayer bought United Artists and its assets. In 1986, Turner Broadcasting System bought MGM/UA, kept most of their assets, then sold the company. Finally, in 1996, Time Warner (now WarnerMedia) bought out Turner Broadcasting, putting the short back in Warner Bros.' ownership.
- The song playing on the opening titles is "You Never Know Where You're Goin' Till You Get There", which had been sung by Sylvester a few weeks earlier in Back Alley Oproar. The same opening title music would be used for Hippety Hopper the following year.
- Hippety Hopper is called "Junior" for this short only.
- The bulldog in this cartoon would later reappear in Hippety Hopper the following year.
- The title is a play on the phrase ”Stop, Look, and Listen”.
