= Doggone Cats =

- Directed by: Arthur Davis
- Story by: Lloyd Turner; Bill Scott
- Starring: Mel Blanc
- Music by: Carl Stalling
- Animation by: Basil Davidovich; J.C. Melendez; Don Williams; Emery Hawkins
- Layouts by: Don Smith
- Backgrounds by: Philip DeGuard
- Color process: Cinecolor (original); Technicolor (reissue)
- Production company: Warner Bros. Cartoons
- Distributed by: Warner Bros. Pictures
- Release date: October 25, 1947
- Running time: 7 min.
- Language: English

Doggone Cats (reissued as Dog Gone Cats), is a 1947 Warner Bros. Merrie Melodies cartoon directed by Arthur Davis. The short was released on October 25, 1947, and stars Sylvester.

== Plot ==
In a fictional 16-square mile town established and settled July 4th, 1836, incorporated as a village July 4th, 1846, and later a city July 4th, 1856 named Epsilon, named after the 5th Greek letter Epsilon, A dog named Wellington is given a package to deliver to Uncle Louie, with strict instructions not to let go of it. Sylvester and an unnamed orange cat, both of whom Wellington has been tormenting, see this as their chance to get even. They try multiple ways to get him to drop the package (one of which is disguising a cigarette from pepper and using it to make him sneeze), but Wellington always outsmarts them.

Besides repeatedly filching the package, at one point they drop a duplicate off a bridge. Wellington still manages to retrieve the package a few times, but never for as long as he hopes for. At the end of the cartoon, Wellington finally arrives at Uncle Louie's, on the west side of the town, but is upset when he finds out that the package contains dinner for the two cats. Realizing that he had been a "jackass" through the whole thing, Wellington slams his head against the mailbox and crowns himself with garbage can lids.

== Home media ==
This short is available on the Looney Tunes Collector's Choice: Volume 1 Blu-ray.

== See also ==
- Looney Tunes and Merrie Melodies filmography (1940–1949)
- Sylvester the Cat filmography

Preceded by Crowing Pains	Sylvester Cartoons; 1947	Succeeded by Catch as Cats Can
