= Señorella and the Glass Huarache =

1964 short film

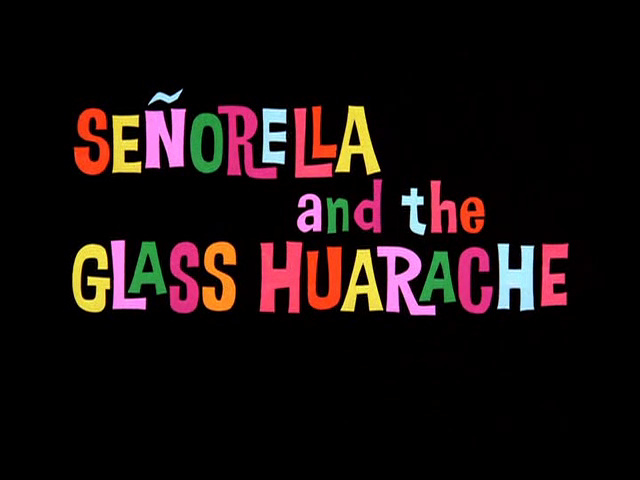
- Title card
- Directed by: Hawley Pratt
- Story by: John Dunn
- Starring: Mel Blanc; Tom Holland
- Edited by: Treg Brown
- Music by: Bill Lava
- Animation by: Gerry Chiniquy; Bob Matz; Virgil Ross; Lee Halpern; Harry Love
- Layouts by: Hawley Pratt
- Backgrounds by: Tom O'Loughlin
- Color process: Technicolor
- Production company: Warner Bros. Cartoons
- Distributed by: Warner Bros. Pictures
- Release date: August 1, 1964 (USA)
- Running time: 6:33
- Language: English

Señorella and the Glass Huarache is a 1964 Warner Bros. Looney Tunes cartoon directed by Hawley Pratt (who also produced the layouts) and written by John W. Dunn. The short was released on August 1, 1964.

== Plot ==
The Fairy Godmother changes Señorella into a princess after turning the wagon into a coach.

At a cantina, a man tells his friend a Mexican version of Cinderella-like story set in Mexico. Leetle Señorella's "strapmother" and her "strapsisters" make her do all their dirty work. They won't let her go to Prince Don Jose Miguel's big fiesta, but her fairy godmother comes through with a gorgeous wardrobe and a beautiful "transporte" drawn by a team of mules, formerly cockroaches. At the fiesta, the prince is bored out of his mind while the girls, including Senorella's strapsiblings, who dance to impress him. However, he immediately becomes smitten when he sees Señorella. She and Prince Don Jose tango the night away, and his father, Don Miguel, is happy. However at midnight Señorella vamooses, leaving her glass huarache, a Mexican sandal, behind.

Prince Don Jose has every girl in the kingdom try on the glass huarache, hoping to find the mysterious princess he fell in love with. However, none of the girls' feet fit the tiny shoe. Before arriving at the house, the strapmother intentionally tosses a tied up Señorella outside in the mud with the pigs out of fear that she'll be revealed as the mysterious princess and win Don Jose's love. Both her daughters try the shoe, but their feet are too big. Prince Don Jose sees a small foot sticking out from the window and he goes to it. He places the huarache on the foot and it fits. Señorella and Don Jose are married. The man revealed that her story may have ended happily ever after, but his didn't. When his friend asks him what happened to the strapmother, the man reveals that he married her. This proves to be true and she forcibly takes him home.

== Home media ==
This short is available on disc 2 of the Looney Tunes Golden Collection: Volume 5 DVD set.
