= Notes to You =

1941 film by Isadore Freleng

- Title card
- Directed by: Isadore Freleng
- Story by: Michael Maltese
- Produced by: Leon Schlesinger
- Starring: Mel Blanc
- Music by: Carl W. Stalling
- Animation by: Manuel Perez
- Color process: Black and white
- Production company: Leon Schlesinger Productions
- Distributed by: Warner Bros. Pictures
- Release date: September 20, 1941
- Running time: 7 min
- Country: United States
- Language: English

Notes to You is a 1941 American animated comedy short film directed by Isadore Freleng. The short was released on September 20, 1941. It is part of the Looney Tunes series and the 92nd cartoon to feature Porky Pig.

This cartoon was remade in 1948, as Back Alley Oproar, with Elmer Fudd in Porky's role and Sylvester as the musical cat.

== Plot ==
A very sleepy Porky Pig has just gone to bed. Outside his window, a cat appears on the fence and begins singing "Largo al factotum" from The Barber of Seville. Porky yells at the cat and throws several objects at him, finally knocking him off the fence with a vase Porky throws a book at him, causing the cat to yowl in pain. Porky returns to bed, but the cat throws the book back and continues the song as Porky slams the window shut. Porky's phone rings and he answers it; it's the cat, finishing the song. Furious, Porky grabs a shotgun and claims "D-uh-d-uh-darn that old cat, I'll fix him this time once and for all!" and places a saucer of milk on the porch. Waiting for the cat, Porky falls asleep. The cat appears, drinks the milk and leaves a note for the milkman. The cat then bangs loudly on the saucer, awaking Porky.

Porky then chases the cat with the shotgun and corners him. The cat sings "Rock-a-Bye Baby", which puts Porky to sleep again. The cat then quietly carries Porky to his bed, gingerly tucks him in, kisses him goodnight and tiptoes away; a few seconds later, Porky is startled as the cat conducts "Frat" by John F. Barth, playing loudly on the radio. As Porky angrily approaches, the cat then returns to the fence outside and begins singing again. Porky closes the window, but the cat reopens the door and sings "Jeepers Creepers". Porky chases him out again, only for the cat to slam the door open into Porky, giving him two black eyes. Back on the fence, the cat sings Make Love With a Guitar. Porky grabs his gun and shoots the cat, who manages to gasp out a chorus of "Aloha 'Oe", and dies. As Porky feels remorse over the cat's death, he sees the cat's ghostly nine lives on the fence.

== Home media ==
This cartoon has been presented in its 1968 colorized form on many public domain video compilations, such as the 2004 Digiview Entertainment DVD release of Porky's Café (where its image was grayscaled to look more like the original version).

It was released in its original black and white form in 1999 on a Columbia House Looney Tunes Collector's Edition VHS Tape entitled Musical Masterpieces. The original black-and-white print, remastered and uncut but unrestored, was released on the Porky Pig 101 DVD officially released by Warner Archive on September 19, 2017.

== See also ==
- Porky Pig filmography
- Looney Tunes and Merrie Melodies filmography (1940–1949)
- List of animated films in the public domain in the United States
