= Goldimouse and the Three Cats =

1960 animated short film by Friz Freleng

- Title card
- Directed by: Friz Freleng
- Story by: Michael Maltese
- Starring: Mel Blanc; June Foray
- Narrated by: June Foray
- Edited by: Treg Brown
- Music by: Milt Franklyn
- Animation by: Gerry Chiniquy; Virgil Ross; Arthur Davis; Harry Love
- Layouts by: Hawley Pratt
- Backgrounds by: Tom O'Loughlin
- Color process: Technicolor
- Production company: Warner Bros. Cartoons
- Distributed by: Warner Bros. Pictures
- Release date: March 15, 1960
- Country: U.S.
- Language: English

Goldimouse and the Three Cats is a Warner Bros. Looney Tunes animated cartoon directed by Friz Freleng, released on March 15, 1960, and stars Sylvester and Sylvester Jr.

This cartoon was included in the 1982 feature film Bugs Bunny's 3rd Movie: 1001 Rabbit Tales. The title and the story is a direct reference and parody to the fairy tale Goldilocks and the Three Bears, thus making it the second Warner Bros. cartoon after Bugs Bunny and the Three Bears to apply said concept.

== Plot ==
A household is inhabited by three feline characters: Sylvester, the paternal figure; Mrs. Sylvester, the maternal counterpart; and Sylvester Jr., affectionately referred to as "Spoiled Brat" due to his demanding disposition. The tranquil atmosphere of their domestic routine is disrupted when Sylvester Jr. expresses disgust with their porridge diet, yearning for a mouse. Seeking to remedy this culinary dissatisfaction, Sylvester proposes a walk in the woods to allow the porridge to cool.

During their absence, Goldimouse, distinguished by her distinctive curly blonde locks, seizes the opportunity to infiltrate the household through a small entrance and eats all the porridges before resting in Sylvester Jr.'s bed. Upon the family's return, they are greeted by evidence of Goldimouse's intrusion: the empty bowls and their messed up beds.

Sylvester Jr. is relieved by the absence of his porridge, and then his excitement increases upon discovering the intruder in his bed. Goldimouse, startled by Sylvester Jr.'s presence, seeks refuge with Sylvester, only to realize his true feline nature before hastily escaping through the tiny entrance.

Motivated by his son's instant demand to eat the mouse, Sylvester embarks on a series of futile attempts to remove Goldimouse from her hole, all ending in comedic failures, including an ill-conceived explosives scheme which causes his family to hunker down in their blast shelter.

Upon his return to his son, Sylvester has finally had enough and angrily gives him porridge by dumping a bowl of it on his head. Junior tastes the porridge and is disgusted at both the taste and what his father did.

== Voice cast ==
- Mel Blanc as Sylvester / Sylvester Jr.
- June Foray as Narrator / Mrs. Sylvester / Goldimouse (uncredited)
