= All a Bir-r-r-d =

All A Bir-r-r-d
- Title card
- Directed by: I. Freleng
- Story by: Tedd Pierce
- Starring: Mel Blanc
- Music by: Carl Stalling
- Animation by: Ken Champin; Virgil Ross; Arthur Davis; Emery Hawkins; Gerry Chiniquy
- Layouts by: Hawley Pratt
- Backgrounds by: Paul Julian
- Color process: Technicolor
- Production company: Warner Bros. Cartoons
- Distributed by: Warner Bros. Pictures; The Vitaphone Corporation
- Release date: June 24, 1950
- Running time: 7:22
- Country: United States
- Language: English

All a Bir-r-r-d is a 1950 Warner Bros. Looney Tunes cartoon directed by Friz Freleng. It was written by Tedd Pierce. The short was released on June 24, 1950, and stars Tweety, Sylvester and an unnamed bulldog, who would later become known as Hector.

== Plot ==
A passenger train arrives at Gower Gulch station, where Tweety is entrusted to the conductor's care. Sylvester, eager to catch Tweety, faces obstacles from the vigilant conductor. Despite warnings, Sylvester attempts to reach Tweety, triggering chaotic antics aboard the train. As Sylvester's pursuit escalates, he encounters a bulldog named Hector, leading to a series of comedic clashes. Sylvester's repeated failures to catch Tweety result in mishaps, including a near collision with the train's furnace.

In a final attempt to claim Tweety, Sylvester disguises himself and manipulates events, only to find Hector instead. A frenetic chase ensues, culminating in Sylvester's defeat and Tweety's observation from the train's caboose. Sylvester returns with a disguise, but grabs Hector instead of Tweety, leaving Tweety lamenting the loss of his playmate. The cartoon ends with Hector and Sylvester in a taxi, much to the cat's dismay.
