= Birds Anonymous =

1957 short film directed by Friz Freleng

- Directed by: Friz Freleng
- Story by: Warren Foster
- Starring: Mel Blanc
- Edited by: Treg Brown
- Music by: Milt Franklyn
- Animation by: Art Davis; Virgil Ross; Gerry Chiniquy; Harry Love
- Layouts by: Hawley Pratt
- Backgrounds by: Boris Gorelick
- Color process: Technicolor
- Production company: Warner Bros. Cartoons
- Distributed by: Warner Bros. Pictures; The Vitaphone Corporation
- Release date: August 10, 1957
- Running time: 6:56
- Language: English

Birds Anonymous is a Warner Bros. Merrie Melodies animated short directed by Friz Freleng and written by Warren Foster, released on August 10, 1957, starring Tweety and Sylvester. The title is a reference to renowned mutual aid organizations Alcoholics Anonymous (A.A.) and Narcotics Anonymous (N.A.).

== Plot ==
Sylvester attempts to catch and eat Tweety and very nearly succeeds, only to be stopped by an erudite, mild-mannered cat (retroactively named Clarence in 1981's The Looney Looney Looney Bugs Bunny Movie and modern Looney Tunes comics), who explains that Sylvester's constant cravings for birds can only lead to self-destruction, and invites Sylvester to a meeting of "Birds Anonymous" ("B.A."), a support group of cats, who have resolved to help one another overcome their bird addictions. Empowered by their stories of their own struggles, Sylvester adopts a new motto for himself: "Birds is strictly for the birds!"

Back at home, it does not take long for Sylvester's new-found will power to falter, due in large part to ubiquitous temptation as he and Tweety live together. Sylvester's temptations are only exacerbated after watching a TV chef preparing a turkey, and then hearing a disc jockey on the radio mention bird-themed songs (he tried to play music to get his mind off of birds). Sylvester then tries handcuffing himself to an iron radiator out of the reach of Tweety, but when Tweety purposely tempts him by asking something which risked his safety, "Don't you like me anymore?" Sylvester finally caves in and makes another grab for the bird. Sylvester is stopped by Clarence, who reluctantly shoots a plunger at Sylvester's mouth. When he has expressed the fear that Sylvester might be weakening, he gratefully confirms Clarence's suspicion.

That night, Sylvester tries to sleep, but is tormented by insomnia and withdrawal symptoms before he completely succumbs to his basic instincts, but is stopped yet again when Clarence arrives and pours alum in his mouth causing it to shrink, after which Sylvester attempts to literally suck Tweety into his mouth through a straw to no avail. Sylvester collapses into sobs on the floor tearfully admitting weakness, but is calmed by Clarence, who tells him there is no need for this demonstration, and consoles him saying that birds and cats can coexist peacefully. To prove his point, Clarence kisses Tweety's head. However, yielding to his own long-suppressed temptation, he relapses into bird addiction and attempts to devour Tweety, who flies away from him. An astonished Sylvester restrains Clarence and yells at him to stop it and control himself. As they continue struggling, Tweety then tells the audience, "Like I said before, once a bad ol' puddy tat, always a bad ol' puddy tat."

== Production notes ==
Birds Anonymous is a reference to the self-help movement Alcoholics Anonymous and Narcotics Anonymous. The voice of Clarence the cat is similar to that of Marvin the Martian, the creation of Chuck Jones. The voice of the B.A. Cat was used by Mel Blanc for the lovebird in Life With Feathers, among other places.

The premise was later adapted into The Last Hungry Cat, again with Sylvester struggling against his conscience over Tweety.

== Reception ==
Shannon K. Garrity writes, "Mel Blanc's amazing vocal performances — it was reputedly the Warner Bros. short of which he was proudest — rank high among the many joys of this lovingly crafted, hilariously self-aware cartoon. Freleng and his team went all out to give Birds Anonymous a film noir look, with dramatic camera angles drawn by layout artist Hawley Pratt and moody backgrounds by Boris Gorelick... Above all, Birds Anoymous satirizes Warner Bros. cartoons themselves. The structure of the standard Sylvester and Tweety cartoon — and all chase cartoons — is threatened by Sylvester's resolution to walk away from the conflict and be a better cat. In the Looney Tunes world, of course, this can't be allowed."

== Honors ==
Birds Anonymous won the Academy Award for Best Animated Short Film in 1958, beating Tabasco Road starring Speedy Gonzales; both shorts were eventually given Blue Ribbon reissues in 1964. When producer Eddie Selzer died, the statuette was passed on to Mel Blanc, who said that this was his favorite cartoon to do voices for, especially his role as Sylvester.

== Home media ==
This film appeared in The Looney Looney Looney Bugs Bunny Movie's third act "The Oswalds" where Sylvester and Clarence fight over Tweety again with Granny intervening.

Birds Anonymous is available, uncut and restored, on the Looney Tunes Golden Collection: Volume 3, the Warner Bros. Home Entertainment Academy Awards Animation Collection, Looney Tunes Super Stars' Tweety & Sylvester: Feline Fwenzy, and the Looney Tunes Platinum Collection: Volume 3. It can also be found on the former UK rental VHS tape of The Bodyguard from 1993. A music/effects only track is also available.
