= John W. Burton (film producer) =

American film producer (1906–1978)

John W. Burton (August 18, 1906 – June 1, 1978) was an American cinematographer and animated film producer best known for his work at Warner Bros. Cartoons.

== Biography ==
Burton was born on August 18, 1906, in Rockford, Illinois. He was employed in Los Angeles at Leon Schlesinger Productions, which made the Looney Tunes and Merrie Melodies series of cartoons for Warner Bros. Pictures, as a cameraman, technician and general troubleshooter. In 1944, after Warner Bros. bought out Schlesinger and the studio was renamed Warner Bros. Cartoons, Burton was promoted to production manager. In 1958, after Edward Selzer retired, he was promoted to producer. He was also able to accept the Academy Award for Best Animated Short Film in 1958 for the Bugs Bunny cartoon Knighty Knight Bugs. Burton left Warner Bros. in 1961 to become an executive at Pacific Title & Art Studio which Schlesinger founded. He was replaced by David H. DePatie.

== Career ==
Baker's earliest credited film in the article, the Art Mix Western Sagebrush Politics, was a low-budget production distributed by Hollywood Pictures.

Burton died June 1, 1978, at age 71 in Los Angeles.
