= Pop 'im Pop! =

1950 film by Robert McKimson

Pop 'Im Pop!
- Directed by: Robert McKimson
- Story by: Warren Foster
- Starring: Mel Blanc
- Music by: Carl Stalling
- Animation by: Charles McKimson; Rod Scribner; Phil DeLara; Manuel Perez; J.C. Melendez
- Layouts by: Cornett Wood
- Backgrounds by: Richard H. Thomas
- Color process: Technicolor
- Production company: Warner Bros. Cartoons
- Distributed by: Warner Bros. Pictures
- Release date: October 28, 1950
- Running time: 7:14
- Language: English

Pop 'Im Pop! is a 1950 Warner Bros. Looney Tunes theatrical cartoon short directed by Robert McKimson and written by Warren Foster. The short was released on October 28, 1950, and stars Sylvester the Cat, Hippety Hopper and Sylvester Jr., in the latter's first appearance.

== Plot ==
Screenshot of a scene from the short animated by J.C. Melendez.

A circus features the attraction "Gracie, the Fightin' Kangaroo!". When Gracie goes off to perform, she leaves her young son, Hippety Hopper, alone in her dressing room. Hippety slips on a pair of his mother's boxing gloves, and wanders off (along the way, treading in wet cement, much to the anger of the workman who is paving the new sidewalk, falling into a pink dress and causing several cars to crash).

Meanwhile, Sylvester is bragging to his son about how he took on a mouse about his own size. Hippety shows up behind him, frightening Sylvester. Junior urges Sylvester to fight Hippety, as they both think he's a giant mouse, and says that if he doesn't, he'll "disillusion a child's faith in his father." The result is a fight between Hippety and Sylvester. Hippety wins at first, but then Sylvester chases him off with an axe. Along the way, they pass the workman, who treads in his own cement as if daring the participants in the chase to do the same – but when they do not, he stands in the center of the sidewalk and plays "Taps" on a bugle as he sinks.

Sylvester is led to the circus, and right when Junior enters his sight, he starts gloating again Sylvester says he wished Hippety was twice as big, with 4 arms and 2 heads. Ironically, Gracie comes out with Hippety in her pouch, causing both the cats to run off. Hippety gives them a friendly wave good-bye.

== Cast ==
- Mel Blanc as Sylvester, Sylvester Jr., Carny Barker, and Stage Manager.
