= Catch as Cats Can =

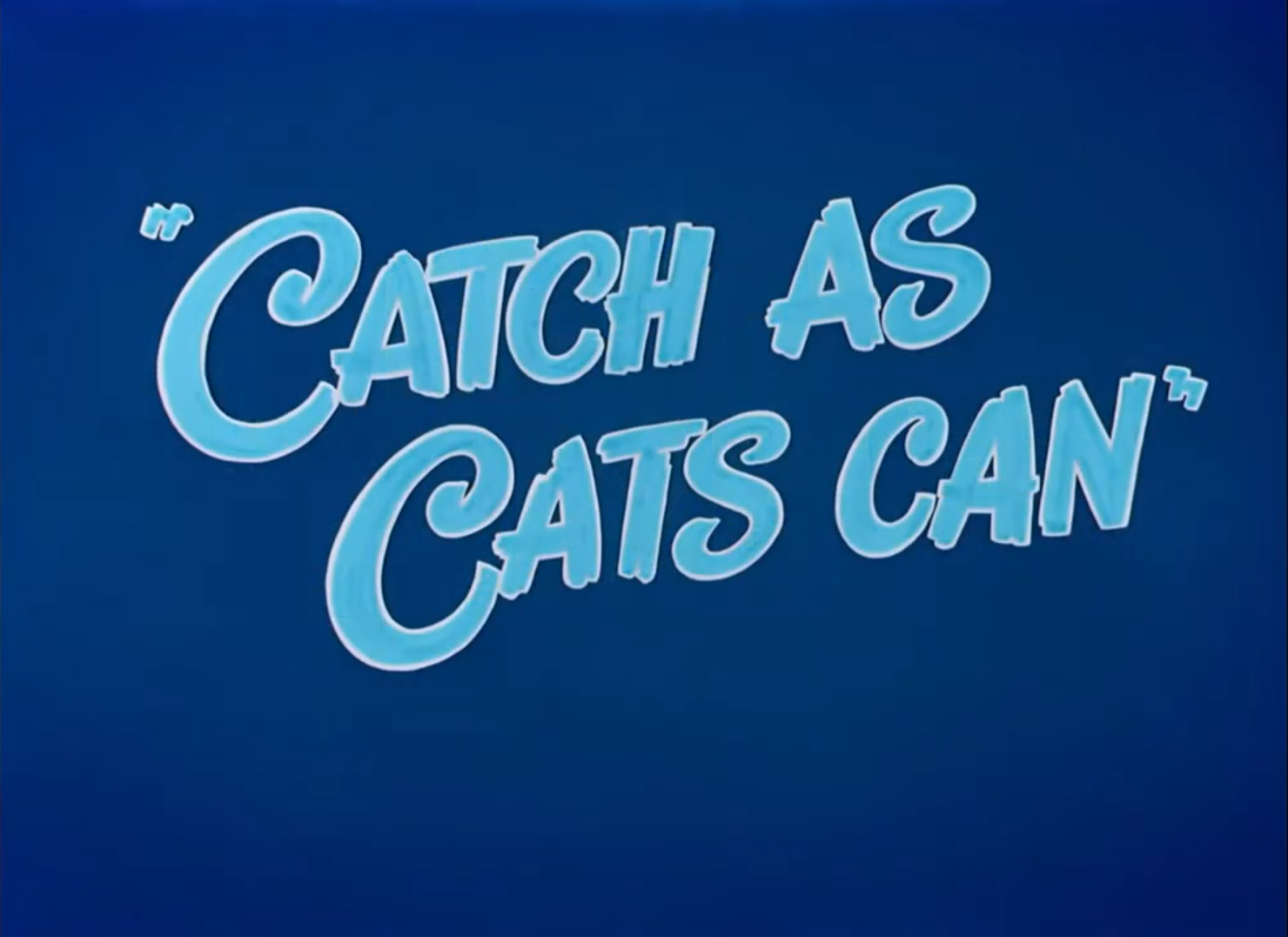
- Title card
- Directed by: Arthur Davis
- Story by: Dave Monahan
- Starring: Mel Blanc; Dave Barry (unc.)
- Music by: Carl Stalling
- Animation by: Basil Davidovich; J.C. Melendez; Don Williams; Herman Cohen; Manny Gould (unc.); John Carey (unc.); A. C. Gamer (effects)
- Layouts by: Don Smith
- Backgrounds by: Philip DeGuard
- Color process: Technicolor
- Production company: Warner Bros. Cartoons
- Distributed by: Warner Bros. Pictures
- Release date: December 6, 1947
- Running time: 7 mins
- Language: English

Catch as Cats Can is a 1947 Warner Bros. Merrie Melodies animated cartoon directed by Arthur Davis. The short was released on December 6, 1947, and stars Sylvester.

== Plot ==
An emaciated canary, singing like Frank Sinatra and attracting the attention of all the admiring chicks, is getting on the nerves of a pipe-puffing parrot, who speaks like Bing Crosby. The parrot spots Sylvester (who in this cartoon speaks differently, in a more dopey voice without a lisp), foraging through the trash. Telling Sylvester he needs more vitamins (which the canary has been swallowing in bulk), he lures Sylvester inside to snare the canary.

The straightforward approach fails (the canary hits him in the left eye turning it violet). Helped by the parrot's encouragement, he carves a female canary from soap and lures Frankie there; the birds slide down a greased counter, into the sink, and down the drain, but only the soap bird goes through the pipe and down Sylvester's throat. A trail of birdseed into the garage seems to work, but Frankie jacks the cat's mouth open. Sylvester laces the vitamins with buckshot, but the magnet attracts everything metal in sight except his prey. The canary turns Sylvester's vacuum cleaner against him, with a crash in the fireplace giving Sylvester a hot-stomach; as he buries his head in the sink, the bird adds Foamo-Seltzer to the water; the cat rockets off, crashing into a wall.

Sylvester finally realizes the portly parrot is a better meal; he is shown sitting on the parrot's perch, imitating his mannerisms.

== Home media ==
This short is available on the Looney Tunes Collector's Choice: Volume 1 Blu-ray.

== See also ==
- Sylvester the Cat filmography
- Looney Tunes and Merrie Melodies filmography (1940–1949)
