= Claws in the Lease =

1963 film by Robert McKimson

- Directed by: Robert McKimson
- Story by: John Dunn
- Starring: Mel Blanc; Nancy Wible
- Edited by: Treg Brown
- Music by: Bill Lava
- Animation by: Warren Batchelder; George Grandpré; Ted Bonnicksen
- Layouts by: Robert Gribbroek
- Backgrounds by: Richard H. Thomas
- Color process: Technicolor
- Production company: Warner Bros. Cartoons
- Distributed by: Warner Bros. Pictures
- Release date: November 9, 1963
- Running time: 6 minutes
- Language: English

Claws in the Lease is a 1963 Warner Bros. traditionally animated Merrie Melodies short film directed by Robert McKimson. The short was released on November 9, 1963, and stars Sylvester and Sylvester Jr.

The story revolves around Sylvester and his son leaving the city dump where they live, and attempting to find local home owners to take them in. After numerous attempts to trick a fat hillbilly woman into letting them both stay with her, their plan backfires and all three wind up living at the dump.

== Plot ==
Sylvester lives with his son in a city dump. Sylvester Jr. then decides to find a home for themselves. He finds one (and notifies his dad in a hurry, making Sylvester think the fish cannery reopened), but the lady who lives there only wants to adopt Sylvester Jr. and separates him from his father. When the lady puts milk in a bowl for Sylvester Jr., Sylvester starts drinking it but gets bopped on the head with a broom by the lady, who then takes Junior inside. Then Sylvester gets angry and starts knocking on the door and screaming: "Alright, you catnapper, come back with my son! Come on now, open up!", but the lady hits him with the broom again, telling him to stay out.

For Sylvester's next attempt, he takes Junior's can of "Pussy Kins Cat Food" and hides in the television. When the lady turns on the TV (she and Junior were preparing to watch her favorite horse opera, 'Cheyenne McMaverick, Sheriff of Gory Gulch', which was on Channel 12), Sylvester is shown eating the food, then he holds up a sign: "Ask for it by name", and starts ad-libbing a jingle for it: "Pussy Kins Cat Food tastes real good, satisfies cats like cat food should, hardens their muscles, softens their fur, Pussy Kins Cat Food makes them purr", but the lady gets wise and throws him out of the house through a window, breaking said window, and throwing the can after him. Then Sylvester continues the "commercial": "Are you getting more cat food lately... but enjoying it less?" (This is a parody of a Camel commercial from the period)

Junior lets Sylvester back in the house, but when he hears the lady coming (singing "Home on the Range") Sylvester hides in the shower, but that is exactly where the lady goes. She absent-mindedly uses the cat to scrub her back, and wipes her feet on him as well, after she throws him out of the shower. He hides in her bathrobe which the lady puts on right after leaving the shower. With Sylvester unknowingly still in the bathrobe, the lady starts inserting rollers in her hair, but a few end up in Sylvester's head. When the cat pops up from behind the lady, she screams and he makes a break for it.

Sylvester finally brings out the heavy artillery by filling the house with hordes of mice, muttering, "I'll show that old bat I am worth my salt one way or another!". Upon the lady's screams, Sylvester comes in wearing a superhero's cape and suit and announces: "This is a job for Superpuss!" He enters the house but is immediately thrown out by the mice who also eject Sylvester Jr. and the lady. The lady is infuriated with Sylvester, "An' it's all yer fault, ya stupid feline!" and pounds him on the head for having her evicted from her house.

The cartoon ends with Sylvester Jr., Sylvester, and the lady living at the dump. He is dividing up the chicken bones as in the beginning, but the lady orders him to "git up here with that grub, before I turn ya wrong side out! Ya silly cat!!!" Junior refers to them as being "one big happy family... I guess."

== See also ==
- List of American films of 1963
- List of cartoons featuring Sylvester
