= Hippety Hopper (film) =

- Title card (unrestored)
- Directed by: Robert McKimson
- Story by: Warren Foster
- Starring: Mel Blanc
- Music by: Carl Stalling; Milt Franklyn
- Animation by: John Carey; Phil De Lara; Charles McKimson; Pete Burness; Manny Gould
- Layouts by: Cornett Wood
- Backgrounds by: Richard H. Thomas
- Color process: Technicolor
- Production company: Warner Bros. Cartoons
- Distributed by: Warner Bros. Pictures
- Release date: November 19, 1949 (USA)
- Running time: 7:06
- Language: English

Hippety Hopper is a Warner Bros. Merrie Melodies cartoon directed by Robert McKimson and written by Warren Foster. The short was released on November 19, 1949, and stars Sylvester and Hippety Hopper.

== Plot ==
A despondent mouse, contemplating suicide at the waterfront, is saved by a caged baby kangaroo. The mouse proposes a deal: the kangaroo will be freed if he will help the mouse terrorize Sylvester, the source of the mouse's misery. They soon concoct a scheme to make Sylvester believe the mouse has grown to giant size by taking vitamins. Despite Sylvester's attempts to defeat the "giant mouse," he fails repeatedly, being constantly beaten to a pulp by the violently playful joey, and drawing the ire of the house bulldog, who berates him for not doing his job right.

When the bulldog himself decides to intervene (and nearly succeeds as his larger build prevents him from being as easily beaten as Sylvester), the mouse bites him on the foot, distracting him with pain and allowing the kangaroo to kick the bulldog out of the house. The mouse threatens to pin his ears back if he tries anything again. The dog scoffs that if that happens, he'll take up ballet. He attempts to go back in and the promise is promptly confirmed. Defeated, the bulldog and Sylvester both hilariously take up ballet to avoid any further humiliation.

== Home media ==
DVD:

- Looney Tunes Golden Collection: Volume 6 (with Blue Ribbon reissue titles)
- Looney Tunes Super Stars' Sylvester and Hippety Hopper: Marsupial Mayhem (with original opening bullseye rings)

== See also ==
- Sylvester the Cat filmography
- Looney Tunes and Merrie Melodies filmography (1940–1949)
