= Edward Selzer =

American film producer (1893–1970)

- Born: January 12, 1893; Harlem, New York, U.S.
- Died: February 22, 1970 (aged 77); Los Angeles, California, U.S.
- Other names: Eddie Selzer; Isidore Selzer
- Occupation: Film producer
- Years active: 1914–1958
- Employer(s): Warner Bros. Pictures (1930–1944); Warner Bros. Cartoons (1944–1958)
- Spouse: Laura Selzer (m. 1927)
- Children: 2

Edward Selzer (January 12, 1893 – February 22, 1970) was an American film producer who served as head of Warner Bros. Cartoons from 1944 to 1958.

== Personal life ==
The son of German Jewish immigrants, Selzer was raised in New York City with his brother, then enlisted and served in the US Navy where he fought as a Golden Gloves boxer. He won a boxing exhibition for the Navy and was awarded with a weekend pass. While out on leave, he met a New York chorus girl named Laura Cohen; he later married her in 1927 and relocated to Los Angeles where they raised two children; Phyllis and Robert.

== Career at Warner Bros. ==
=== Early career ===
In 1930, Lewis Warner (son of Harry Warner) persuaded Selzer to join Warner Bros. to work on Robert Ripley's "Believe It or Not" series and to start an animation unit. Due to The Great Depression, he had no other choice but to take the job. He was also on an around-the-world tour with Ripley on Believe it or Not. In late 1933 he was named Director of Publicity at Warners and from 1937 to 1944, he served as the head of the trailer and title departments.

=== Warner Bros. Cartoons ===
After Leon Schlesinger sold his studio to Warner Bros. Pictures in July 1944, Selzer was assigned studio head by Jack L. Warner. His first cartoon was Goldilocks and the Jivin' Bears.

Unlike his predecessor, Selzer did not want any on-screen credit as producer for Warner Bros. Much of what is publicly known about Selzer's personality and business acumen is from Chuck Jones' autobiography, Chuck Amuck: The Life and Times of an Animated Cartoonist. In it, Jones paints Selzer as an interfering bore with no sentiment towards or appreciation of animated cartoons. However, Jones also grew to think that Selzer was a genuine if inadvertent asset as a resisting force to artistically push against and inspire the artists to excel to defy him. They later developed a mutual respect and understanding of one another, remaining friendly until Selzer's passing.

Selzer was said to be proud of his position as producer of the Looney Tunes series because of the joy the team's creations brought to so many; however, he is also known for having numerous feuds with the staff when it came to their creative decisions. Friz Freleng famously butted heads with Selzer during the production of Tweetie Pie, where the latter of which did not think that pairing Sylvester the Cat and Tweety was a viable decision. The argument reached its crux when Freleng reportedly placed his drawing pencil on Selzer's desk, angrily telling him that if he knew so much about animation, he should do the work himself instead. Selzer backed off the issue and apologized to Freleng that evening. Tweetie Pie went on to win Warner Brothers' first Academy Award for Animated Short Film, in 1947, with Tweety and Sylvester proving to be among the most endearing duos in Warner Bros. cartoons. Accepting the Short Subject (Cartoon) award for Tweetie Pie from Shirley Temple at the 20th Academy Awards ceremony on March 20, 1948, Selzer said:

In accepting this award, I'm naturally thrilled, but I accept it for the entire Warner Bros. Cartoon Studio. It might interest you to know that in production of this "Tweetie Pie," 85 percent of our personnel were directly connected with its construction. However, the one man who really should be up here getting this award and not me, is the director of the picture, Friz Freleng, who is in the audience. I can't pay him too great a tribute. Thank you.

He also loudly (and indelicately) declared that there was nothing funny about a skunk who spoke French, but proudly accepted the Academy Award for Animated Short Film in 1949 – for For Scent-imental Reasons, a Pepé Le Pew cartoon while giving credit where due. Selzer also forbade Robert McKimson from producing any future cartoons with the Tasmanian Devil in them after seeing the Devil's premiere short and deeming the creature far too grotesque to be a recurring character. Selzer changed his mind and allowed further cartoons with the Tasmanian Devil, only upon discovering from Jack Warner that he was in fact a massive hit with audiences.

Selzer's edict that "camels aren't funny" inspired Freleng to disprove him again by directing Sahara Hare, a cartoon in which much of the comedy arises from Yosemite Sam's attempts to control his dim-witted camel. Chuck Jones and Michael Maltese created Bully for Bugs in direct response to Selzer's declaration that there was nothing funny about bullfighting.

Selzer was also known to be one of the first men in animation to bring female artists on board and not relegate them to secretarial roles; rather, he encouraged their participation in the creative process and valued their feedback.

Selzer retired in 1958, and John Burton became the head of Warner Bros. Cartoons.

== Death ==
Selzer died on February 22, 1970, after a long illness. Upon his death, three of his four Academy Award Oscar statues for the winning cartoons he produced were distributed to the crews behind the cartoons; the one for 1957's Birds Anonymous was given to voice artist Mel Blanc while the ones for Tweetie Pie and Speedy Gonzales were given to Freleng.
