= Bell Hoppy =

- Directed by: Robert McKimson
- Story by: Tedd Pierce
- Starring: Mel Blanc
- Music by: Carl W. Stalling
- Animation by: Charles McKimson; Herman Cohen; Rod Scribner; Phil DeLara
- Layouts by: Robert Givens
- Backgrounds by: Richard H. Thomas
- Color process: Technicolor
- Production company: Warner Bros. Cartoons
- Distributed by: Warner Bros. Pictures
- Release date: April 17, 1954
- Country: United States
- Language: English

Bell Hoppy is a 1954 Warner Bros. Merrie Melodies cartoon short directed by Robert McKimson. The short was released on April 17, 1954, and stars Sylvester the Cat and Hippety Hopper.

The story sees Sylvester in his "mouse chaser" persona, once again confusing baby kangaroo Hippety Hopper for a giant mouse. This plot is intertwined with a reversal of the "belling the cat" fable from the Middle Ages; instead of mice wanting to avoid becoming prey to a hungry cat, here, a pack of starving alley cats hope to place a bell around the neck of the largest mouse they can find, so that upon its approach, they can ambush it, kill it and feast on its carcass. Sylvester comes into the picture when – wanting to join a fraternal organization called "the Loyal Order of Alley Cats Mouse and Chowder Club" – he is offered the opportunity for membership by the leader of the club by successfully placing the bell around the mouse's neck.

== Plot ==
Sylvester has once again been "blackballed" from membership to the Loyal Order of Alley Cats Mouse and Chowder Club, a fraternity of alley cats, that he so desperately wants to join. Meanwhile, Hippety Hopper escapes from a cage at the local city zoo office and hides in a trash can. The Grand High Exalted Poobah of the Order, digging through the trash to find food, expresses his frustration aloud at not being able to find anything good to eat and says he could eat the largest mouse possible...at which time he finds Hippety. Hippety proceeds to do to him what he usually does to Sylvester, prompting the Poobah to call a special meeting.

Meanwhile, Sylvester makes one last attempt to gain membership into the Brotherhood. The Poobah – seeing Sylvester as a sucker – offers to let Sylvester join if he can place the bell around the neck of the largest mouse he can find, so the cats can gang up on the mouse when they hear him coming. Soon Sylvester and Hippety quickly bump into each other and the following gags occur (all with Sylvester getting pummeled into submission):

- Sylvester simply tries to place the bell around Hippety's neck, but the kangaroo kicks the cat. The bell winds up around Sylvester's neck, earning him his first beating.
- The cat hides in a delivery cart, with two bells around its frame. Hippety accidentally knocks the parked wagon's handle, causing it to careen down a steep hill. The other alley cats hide to ambush what they think is the "giant mouse", but instead smash the cart (and Sylvester) flat with a huge club wielded by all of them at once.
- Sylvester finds Hippety hiding in a junkyard and tries to use a teeter totter to catapult his antagonist into a wall. But Hippety will not budge (after Sylvester jumps from a stack of junk onto the board), and the cat smashes into a wall...next to a stoplight that sounds a bell-type sound when the lights change. Sylvester knows what this means and tries to hide on the stoplight...exactly where the other cats strike.

In the end, Sylvester finally uses a mirror trick to get Hippety to place the bell around his neck. Sylvester is, naturally, excited about finally one-upping his long-time nemesis and calls the cats into position. But by the time the cats are ready to pounce on the baby kangaroo-mistaken-for-a-giant-mouse, Hippety is back in the city zoo truck and very happy with his new toy. The oblivious cats jump in the path of the truck, getting them all run over.

Taking the opportunity, Sylvester now gets to serve as the Brotherhood's Grand High Exalted Poobah (since he is now the only active member because the others are all bandaged up) only to be "blackballed" again...this time after declaring himself leader and pounding the gavel on the table too hard, causing the black 8 billiard ball on the table to bounce up and hit him on the top of his head.
