= Hoppy-Go-Lucky =

- Directed by: Robert McKimson
- Story by: Tedd Pierce
- Starring: Mel Blanc; Stan Freberg (uncredited)
- Music by: Carl W. Stalling
- Animation by: Charles McKimson; Rod Scribner; Phil DeLara; Herman Cohen
- Layouts by: Robert Givens
- Backgrounds by: Richard H. Thomas
- Color process: Technicolor
- Production company: Warner Bros. Cartoons
- Distributed by: Warner Bros. Pictures
- Release date: August 9, 1952
- Running time: 6:55
- Language: English

Hoppy-Go-Lucky is a 1952 Warner Bros. Looney Tunes short film directed by Robert McKimson. The short was released on August 9, 1952, and stars Sylvester and Hippety Hopper. The title is a play on the expression "happy-go-lucky".

== Plot ==
The cartoon spoofs the 1937 book Of Mice and Men by John Steinbeck, which was popular at the time; it features a giant, dimwitted cat named "Benny", who wants Sylvester, whom he calls "George", to help him catch a mouse to "hug and pet." Mel Blanc voices Sylvester and Stan Freberg voices Benny. Sylvester tries to tell Benny the mouse is a king-sized mouse, but Benny does not believe him and threatens to "stroke his fur the wrong way" if he drives him crazy.
