= Freudy Cat =

- Directed by: Robert McKimson
- Story by: Tedd Pierce
- Starring: Mel Blanc
- Edited by: Treg Brown
- Music by: Bill Lava
- Animation by: Ted Bonnicksen; Warren Batchelder; George Grandpré
- Layouts by: Robert Gribbroek
- Backgrounds by: Robert Gribbroek
- Color process: Technicolor
- Production company: Warner Bros. Cartoons
- Distributed by: Warner Bros. Pictures
- Release date: March 14, 1964
- Running time: 7 minutes
- Language: English

Freudy Cat is a 1964 Warner Bros. Looney Tunes animated short directed by Robert McKimson. The short was released on March 14, 1964, and stars Sylvester the Cat, Sylvester Jr. and Hippety Hopper.

== Plot ==
A paranoid Sylvester flashes back to earlier cartoons such as Who's Kitten Who?, Cats A-Weigh!, and The Slap-Hoppy Mouse while describing to a psychiatrist that he thinks Hippety Hopper is out to get him.
