= Hippety Hopper =

Warner Bros. theatrical cartoon character

- A still of a scene of Hippety Hopper as he appeared in his self-titled film (animated by Manny Gould).
- First appearance: Hop, Look and Listen (1948)
- Created by: Robert McKimson
- Voiced by: Mel Blanc (1950–1961); Gilbert Mack (1956); Debi Derryberry (Bugs Bunny Builders Episodes 1-26); Sky Alexis (Bugs Bunny Builders Episodes 30-present)

In-universe information
- Species: Kangaroo
- Gender: Male (Female in Bugs Bunny Builders)

Hippety Hopper is a young kangaroo character in the Warner Bros. Looney Tunes and Merrie Melodies series of cartoons. Robert McKimson introduced Hippety Hopper in Hop, Look and Listen (1948), which established the pattern for future Hippety Hopper cartoons. The character appeared in 14 theatrical cartoons between 1948 and 1964.

== History ==
Hippety Hopper cartoons have a typical formula: Hopper escapes from a zoo, circus, etc., and is mistaken for a giant mouse by Sylvester the Cat. Frequently, Hopper changes places with an actual mouse, generally when it is most embarrassing for Sylvester. Sylvester tries to capture and eat his "prey", but the innocent and infantile Hippety mistakes Sylvester's predations for a game of rough-housing. Sylvester is repeatedly kicked, punched, and spun around, but each failure only strengthens his desire to have the "giant mouse" for lunch.

Hippety Hopper returns in McKimson's Pop 'Im Pop! (1950), in which proud father Sylvester boasts of his mousing skills to his son, Sylvester Jr. In Cats A-Weigh! (1953), Sylvester accepts a position as mouse-catcher on a ship. He encounters Hippety Hopper being shipped from Australia. Sylvester mistakes Hippety Hopper once again for a giant mouse and the baby kangaroo promptly beats the cat soundly. Junior is horrified, but the true victim is Sylvester, humiliated by a mere "mouse" in front of his own son.

McKimson would continue the Sylvester/Hippety Hopper series for 16 years, varying it slightly from cartoon to cartoon. In Bell Hoppy (1954), for example, in a twist on "belling the cat", Sylvester must hang a bell around the neck of the biggest mouse that he can find to join the "Loyal Order of Alley Cats Mouse and Chowder Club." Surprisingly, he actually succeeds this one time and gets to join the club, even becoming its Grand High Exalted Poobah, "being the only active member" (the other members were hit by the city zoo truck taking Hippety away to the zoo when they tried to catch him after Sylvester belled him).

In Lighthouse Mouse, Sylvester must guard a lighthouse from the baby kangaroo and a mouse who wants nothing more than to turn the lighthouse's light off just so that he can get some sleep.

Hoppy-Go-Lucky (1952) was a parody of Of Mice and Men, with Sylvester accompanied by the giant, simple-minded cat "Bennie", who wants a mouse "to hug him and pet him". The central theme is always the same: Sylvester is shamed for his failure to capture what seems to be a simple "mouse".

Hippety Hopper also appeared on records produced by Capitol Records and Golden Records. Unlike in the cartoons, Hippety actually spoke frequently on these, voiced by Mel Blanc using an Australian accent.

The Hippety Hopper/Sylvester/Sylvester Jr. cartoons ended in 1964 when the Warner Bros. studio closed its animation unit.

Hippety Hopper was intended to appear as a cameo in the film Who Framed Roger Rabbit (1988) in the deleted scene "Acme's Funeral". In that deleted scene, he appears with other animated characters scared when Casper appears at the funeral.

A female version of Hippety appears in the preschool series Bugs Bunny Builders, voiced by Debi Derryberry.

Hippety made a cameo in the 2026 film Coyote vs. Acme.

== Appearances ==
All of the shorts from 1948 to 1964 were directed by Robert McKimson.

- Hop, Look and Listen (1948)
- Hippety Hopper (1949)
- Pop 'im Pop! (1950)
- Bushy Hare (1950, cameo)
- Who's Kitten Who (1952)
- Hoppy-Go-Lucky (1952)
- Cats A-Weigh! (1953)
- Bell Hoppy (1954)
- Lighthouse Mouse (1955)
- Too Hop to Handle (1956)
- The Slap-Hoppy Mouse (1956)
- Mouse-Taken Identity (1957)
- Hoppy Daze (1961)
- Freudy Cat (1964)
