= Sylvester Jr. =

Warner Bros. theatrical cartoon character

- Looney Tunes character
- First appearance: Pop 'im Pop! (October 28, 1950; 76 years ago)
- Created by: Robert McKimson
- Voiced by: Mel Blanc (1950–1989); Bob Bergen (1991, 1998–present); Ric Herbert (1995, 2012); Joe Alaskey (2001–2004)

In-universe information
- Species: Cat
- Gender: Male
- Family: Sylvester (father)
- Relatives: Alan (uncle); Unnamed grandmother

Sylvester J. Pussycat Jr., simply known as Sylvester Jr., is an animated cartoon character in the Warner Bros. Looney Tunes and Merrie Melodies series. He was created by Robert McKimson.

== Appearances ==
Sylvester Jr. appeared in the following shorts:

- Pop 'im Pop! (1950)
- Who's Kitten Who? (1952)
- Cats a-Weigh (1953)
- Too Hop to Handle (1956)
- The Slap-Hoppy Mouse (1956)
- Mouse-Taken Identity (1957)
- Cat's Paw (1959) (no Hippety Hopper)
- Tweet Dreams (1959) (no Hippety Hopper) (note: flashback cameo in a Tweety and Sylvester cartoon)
- Goldimouse and the Three Cats (1960) (no Hippety Hopper) (note: the only short directed by Friz Freleng to feature Sylvester Jr. and the only cartoon where his mother appears)
- Birds of a Father (1961) (no Hippety Hopper)
- Fish and Slips (1962) (no Hippety Hopper)
- Claws in the Lease (1963) (no Hippety Hopper)
- Freudy Cat (1964)

== Later appearances ==
After the original Looney Tunes shorts, Junior would show up sporadically in later years. In the 1990s animated series The Sylvester & Tweety Mysteries, Sylvester has a flashback to his childhood in the episode "A Mynah Problem"; in the flashback sequence, young Sylvester looks like Sylvester Jr. and Sylvester's father looks like the adult Sylvester.

He is seen in one of the "Mysterious Phenomenon of the Unexplained" shorts of the Stranger Than Fiction Looney Tunes web shorts compilation DVD alongside his father on a camping trip interrupted by Bigfoot.

He appears as a boss in the third world in the video game The Bugs Bunny Birthday Blowout, riding his skateboard. He also appears in the video game Sylvester and Tweety: Cagey Capers by giving hints to where Tweety is hiding.

Sylvester Junior appears in the Looney Tunes Cartoons episode in cameo "Happy Birthday Bugs Bunny!".

Sylvester Jr. makes an appearance as one of the many toons approaching "Kevin Avery" at the dénouement of Coyote vs. Acme (2026).
