= Manuel Perez (animator) =

American animator (1914–1981)

- Manuel Perez at Warner Bros., 1937
- Born: June 17, 1914; Morenci, Arizona, United States
- Died: January 18, 1981 (aged 66); Van Nuys, Los Angeles, California, United States
- Occupations: Animator, animation director

Manuel "Manny" Perez (June 17, 1914 – January 18, 1981) was an American animator and animation director, whose career spanned 40 years, from the 1940s to the 1980s, and best known for his work on the Warner Bros. Cartoons animated shorts, working on such cartoons as Bugs Bunny, Elmer Fudd and Daffy Duck. Later in his career he worked on Fritz the Cat and The Lord of the Rings.

== Biography ==
Born in 1914 in Morenci, Arizona, in 1917 his family moved to Los Angeles where Perez later attended high school. An athlete, he took part in football, baseball and track. Two years after graduating he was hired by Leon Schlesinger as a trainee animator.

'Manny' Perez worked on over 300 cartoons during the 'Golden Age of American Animation', mainly for Warner Bros. Cartoons, for whom he started animating in 1938, but also for Bill Melendez Productions, DePatie-Freleng Enterprises and Hanna-Barbera. His first credited cartoon was Porky's Bear Facts (1941). Among the cartoons he animated were those featuring Bugs Bunny, Daffy Duck, Porky Pig, Elmer Fudd, Tweety and Sylvester, Quick Draw McGraw, the Pink Panther, The Peanuts specials A Charlie Brown Christmas and He's Your Dog, Charlie Brown, Wile E. Coyote and the Road Runner, Doctor Dolittle, The Cat in the Hat, Fritz the Cat, where he infamously animated the scene with Fritz and three girls in the bathtub, and Plastic Man, among many others.

A member of the labor union The Screen Cartoonists Guild, Perez was one of the animators involved in the 'Looney Tunes Lock Out' of 1941, when Leon Schlesinger, who had been producing cartoons for Warner Bros. Cartoons since the mid-1930s, locked out those animators who had joined the Guild, including Perez. After six days Schlesinger relented and allowed them to go back to work.

Although Perez worked for Friz Freleng for about ten years, the two did not get along. According to animator Greg Duffell in 1999:

Virgil Ross told me that Perez was "Friz's whipping boy"... Virgil felt that Friz belittled Manny, then when Manny left Virgil felt that he became the target of Friz' wrath ... I met Manny Perez in 1975 at San Rio Productions during the production of a feature film (I've forgotten the title now) that was like a rock music Fantasia. I was quite thrilled, of course, to meet Mr. Perez (didn't know he'd be there) and started to ask him questions about his work. At that time, I wasn't clear which animator did what, though I could see the various styles while watching the cartoons. Manny was very elusive about identifying any of his work for me. At the mention of Friz' name he said these words, with a tense smile, that I'll never forget: "You know, I worked so long for him. ... well ... I got to hate that little guy ..."

In his later years, Perez worked on Journey Back to Oz (1971); the animated version of The Lord of the Rings (1978), The Plastic Man Comedy/Adventure Show (1979), and The Bugs Bunny/Road Runner Movie (1979).

Perez died on January 18, 1981 at the age of 66 in Van Nuys, California. The final projects he worked on were Hey Good Lookin' and Heidi's Song.
