= Virgil Ross =

American animator (1907–1996)

Virgil Walter Ross
- Born: August 8, 1907; Watertown, New York, U.S.
- Died: May 15, 1996 (aged 88); Los Angeles, California, U.S.
- Other name: Virgil Ross
- Occupation: Animator
- Years active: 1929–1989
- Employer(s): The Charles Mintz Studio (1930–1932); Animated Pictures (1931); Universal Cartoon Studios (1931–1935); Leon Schlesinger Productions/Warner Bros. Cartoons (1935–1962); Paul Fennell's studio (mid 50s); Hanna-Barbera (1960–1986); DePatie-Freleng Enterprises (1963–1980); Ed Graham Productions (1964); Format Films (1965-67); Walter Lantz Productions (1971); Bakshi Productions (1971–1972, 1974–1981, 1989); Filmation (1973–1974, 1979); Chuck Jones Enterprises (1978–1980); Marvel Productions (1981–1982); Warner Bros. Animation (1981–1982); DimenMark International (1983); Rick Reinert Productions (1983); Walt Disney Productions (1984–1985)
- Spouse: Frances Ewing (m. 1940)
- Children: 1

Virgil Walter Ross (August 8, 1907 – May 15, 1996) was an American artist, cartoonist, and animator best known for his work on the Warner Bros. animated shorts including the shorts of legendary animator Friz Freleng.

== Biography ==
=== Early years ===
Virgil Ross (as he was usually known) spent his early years in New York state and in Michigan, but his family moved to Long Beach, California, when he was in his late teens. This state was to be his primary home for the rest of his life.

=== Cartooning and animation ===
His introduction to cartooning was in high-school, where he took a class in that art form. He started drawing title cards for silent films before moving into animated films. Early work was done for Charles Mintz (later Screen Gems), Iwerks Studio, and then on to Walter Lantz, where he began working on developing Oswald the Lucky Rabbit and met Tex Avery. When Avery moved to work for Leon Schlesinger in 1935 on the Looney Tunes and Merrie Melodies series, he took Ross, Chuck Jones, Sid Sutherland, and Cecil Surry with him. Ross spent about 30 years there, first under Avery's supervision, and then Bob Clampett after Avery's departure in 1941. He later moved to Friz Freleng's unit after animating for Clampett for some time, presumably due to Ross' tepid relationship with him. Ross would spend his career with Friz for the rest of him time at Warner Bros., with him animating on some of Freleng's most renowned shorts.

Of the very many characters Ross animated, he is most closely associated with Bugs Bunny. As an animator for A Wild Hare (1940), generally regarded as the first appearance of Bugs Bunny, Ross had a first person view of the creation of the character. It received an Academy Award nomination for Best Cartoon Short Subject.

In an interview, published in Animato magazine #19, Ross recalled how the character of Bugs Bunny came to be. He says in the interview, "We received orders from the story department that they needed a drawing of a bunny. We all did drawings and tacked them on the wall, and the storymen voted on them. We had one writer named Bugs Hardaway, and for some reason, this one drawing became known as Bugs' Bunny. Leon Schlesinger liked the sound of the name and told them to keep it, and that's how Bugs Bunny got his name. Years later, before he died, Hardaway tried to get some credit for making the character, which he probably deserved. But Warner Bros owned the rights to everything we created."

He also did a great deal of work involving Daffy Duck, Yosemite Sam, Tweety, and many others, including the Rudy Larriva-directed Wile E. Coyote and the Road Runner shorts. When handling long-eared characters such as Bugs or Wile E., Ross occasionally tilted or waved an ear in otherwise-static scenes.

His résumé also includes time spent with such firms as Filmation (where he worked on the early 1970s Star Trek: The Animated Series), Hanna-Barbera, and Marvel Comics. In 1979 he animated Woody Woodpecker for a special scene at the 51st Academy Awards. He briefly animated for Disney (via Rick Reinert) for Winnie the Pooh and a Day for Eeyore, for Chuck Jones at Warner Bros. again, and for 1984 educational short "Destination Careers: Explore Jobs" starring Disney's Donald Duck. According to animator Dave Bennett, Ross struggled to animate Donald after animating Daffy for so many years.

He was known as being self-effacing. In an interview with John Province in 1989, he is quoted as saying "I always had an eye for movement, and I think this kept me in the business a lot longer than a lot of guys, despite the fact that I really wasn't very good at drawing. When I started out in animation, you didn't have to be a good artist. I just had a little natural talent, and it's mostly just timing anyway."

== Personal life and death ==
He married Frances Ewing in 1940 and they had a daughter. They were married until Ross' death at the age of 88 on May 15, 1996, in Los Angeles, California, United States.

== Awards ==
Virgil Ross received the highest awards available in his profession: the Motion Picture Screen Cartoonists Golden Award (1984) and the Winsor McCay Award (1988). Three of the cartoons he had animated won Oscars: Tweetie Pie (1947), Birds Anonymous (1957), and Knighty Knight Bugs (1958).
