= Hawley Pratt =

American film director and animator (1911–1999)

- Born: Hawley Barnard Pratt; June 9, 1911; Seattle, Washington; U.S.
- Died: March 4, 1999 (aged 87); Thousand Oaks, California; U.S.
- Occupations: Animator, character designer, illustrator
- Years active: 1933–1990
- Spouse: Cecelia Pratt (m. 1933; died 1990)

Hawley Barnard Pratt (June 9, 1911 – March 4, 1999) was an American animator, character designer, and illustrator. He is best known for his work for Warner Bros. Cartoons and as the right-hand man of director Friz Freleng as a layout artist and later as a director. Pratt also worked for Walt Disney Productions, Filmation, and DePatie-Freleng Enterprises where he co-created The Pink Panther.

== Life and career ==
Born in Seattle and raised in the Bronx by his widowed mother Mabel, Pratt graduated from the Pratt Institute in Brooklyn. He became an assistant animator then full-animator at Walt Disney Productions in 1933, especially he worked on The Nutcracker Suite sequence for Fantasia where he animated the spinning flowers dancing to “Dance of the Reed-Flutes”. He later left to join Leon Schlesinger Productions, along with fellow animators Bill Melendez, Cornett Wood, and Jack Bradbury who also departed to the same studio after the Disney animators' strike in 1941. At Warners, he served as an assistant animator to Richard Bickenbach before taking over the role as a layout artist providing background layouts and character poses since Sylvester’s debut cartoon, Life with Feathers (finishing many layouts by Owen Fitzgerald and remains replaced him) until the early 1960s. Working closely with director Friz Freleng, Pratt's Warner Bros. resume includes the Oscar-winning cartoons Tweetie Pie, which introduced the duo of Sylvester and Tweety, Speedy Gonzales, where Freleng and Pratt redesigned the character into his modern incarnation, and Birds Anonymous. Pratt directed Hollywood Daffy, a project abandoned by Freleng, as well as Señorella and the Glass Huarache, released in 1964 after the studio closed its animation division.

Pratt briefly worked at the Hanna-Barbera studio with Freleng before the two moved to DePatie–Freleng Enterprises. They created the Pink Panther character for the animated title sequence of the 1963 feature film of the same name; though, Pratt is often solely credited for the character's creation. While there, he directed (or co-directed) all episodes of The Pink Panther Show. Pratt made his directorial effort in the 1966 short The Pink Blueprint, which received an Oscar nomination for Best Short Subject (Cartoon). His other directorial works also include three Roland and Rattfink shorts, The Super 6, and three Dr. Seuss television specials: The Cat in the Hat, The Lorax and Dr. Seuss on the Loose. Pratt also served as associate director and animator of the 1964 film The Incredible Mr. Limpet.

Pratt's skills also had him illustrating several Little Golden Books and Big Golden Books.

Pratt died on March 4, 1999.
