= List of Looney Tunes television specials =

Since 1972 the Looney Tunes franchise spawned many television specials. Note all specials listed were originally aired in prime-time unless otherwise noted.

== Original specials ==
Title	Year	LTGC availability (all as special features)	Notes
Daffy Duck and Porky Pig Meet the Groovie Goolies	December 16, 1972		Produced by Filmation, with the Looney Tunes characters on loan from Warner Bros. (otherwise a silent partner)
Carnival of the Animals	November 22, 1976	Volume 5, Disc 4	Animation/live-action mix Produced by Chuck Jones Enterprises.
A Connecticut Rabbit in King Arthur's Court (retitled Bugs Bunny in King Arthur's Court for subsequent rebroadcasts)	February 23, 1978	Volume 6, Disc 1	Produced by Chuck Jones Enterprises.
Bugs Bunny's Looney Christmas Tales	November 27, 1979	Volume 5, Disc 4	Three TV shorts later edited out of it. 1) "Bugs Bunny's Christmas Carol" 2) Road Runner: "Freeze Frame" 3) Bugs Bunny: "Fright Before Christmas" Produced by DePatie–Freleng Enterprises and Chuck Jones Enterprises.
Daffy Duck's Easter Show (retitled Daffy Duck's Easter Egg-Citement)	April 1, 1980	Volume 6, Disc 1	Three TV shorts later edited out of it. 1) Daffy, Sylvester, Foghorn Leghorn: "The Yolk's on You" 2) Daffy & Speedy Gonzales: "The Chocolate Chase" 3) "Daffy Flies North" Produced by DePatie–Freleng Enterprises.
Bugs Bunny's Bustin' Out All Over	May 21, 1980	Volume 5, Disc 4	Three TV shorts later edited out of it. 1) Bugs Bunny: "Portrait of the Artist as a Young Bunny" 2) Road Runner: "Soup or Sonic" 3) Bugs Bunny, Marvin Martian: "Spaced Out Bunny" Produced by Chuck Jones Enterprises. Also available on The Essential Bugs Bunny (10/12/2010)
Ounce of Prevention	1982		Awareness video about burn prevention in the home
Cartoon All-Stars to the Rescue	April 21, 1990		Drug-abuse prevention television special, in collaboration with other franchises.

== Anniversary specials ==
Title	Year	Notes
Bugs Bunny/Looney Tunes 50th Anniversary Special	January 14, 1986	Featuring interviews with celebrities
Happy Birthday Bugs!: 50 Looney Years	May 9, 1990	
Hare's to Bugs! A Bugs Bunny Celebration	July 27, 2024	Featuring interviews with Looney Tunes Alumni Billy West, Jeff Bergman, Candi Milo, Bob Bergen, Eric Bauza, Eric Goldberg, Animation Historian Jerry Beck & Many Others. It aired on MeTV Toons on Bugs Bunny's 84th Birthday.

== Specials with reused footage ==
Title	Year	Classic Clips From	Notes
Bugs Bunny's Easter Special	April 7, 1977	Knighty Knight Bugs; Hillbilly Hare; Bully for Bugs; Tweety's Circus; Birds Anonymous; For Scent-imental Reasons; Rabbit of Seville; Little Boy Boo; Robin Hood Daffy; Sahara Hare	Released on DVD.
Bugs Bunny in Space	September 6, 1977	Hare-Way to the Stars; The Hasty Hare; Mad as a Mars Hare; Duck Dodgers in the 24½th Century; His Hare-Raising Tale	Only special with no new animation
Bugs Bunny's Howl-oween Special	October 26, 1977	Featuring Witch Hazel: Bewitched Bunny; Broom-Stick Bunny; A Witch's Tangled Hare; A-Haunting We Will Go; Other shorts: Hyde and Go Tweet (later used in Daffy Duck's Quackbusters); Hyde and Hare; Claws for Alarm (later used in Daffy Duck's Quackbusters); Scaredy Cat; Transylvania 6-5000 (later used in Daffy Duck's Quackbusters)	Released on DVD separately and as part of the Looney Tunes Holiday Triple Feature
How Bugs Bunny Won the West	November 15, 1978	Barbary Coast Bunny; Bonanza Bunny; 14 Carrot Rabbit; Aqua Duck; Wild and Woolly Hare; Drip-Along Daffy	Hosted in live action by actor Denver Pyle; Included in The Essential Bugs Bunny DVD, released on October 12, 2010 in the U.S. Included in Looney Tunes Parodies Collection DVD, released on February 4, 2020 in the U.S. The end where Bugs is singing "Home on the Range" is an audio clip from the 1951 short The Fair-Haired Hare
Bugs Bunny's Valentine Special	February 14, 1979	Hare Splitter; The Grey Hounded Hare; Little Beau Pepe; Of Rice and Hen; Devil May Hare; Hare Trimmed; The Super Snooper; Rabbit Romeo; Wild Over You	Released on DVD as Bugs Bunny's Cupid Capers
The Bugs Bunny Mother's Day Special	May 12, 1979	Bushy Hare; Stork Naked; Quackodile Tears; Mother Was a Rooster; Goo Goo Goliath; Apes of Wrath	Only released on VHS in 1992 by Warner Home Video under its original title. Later retitled Bugs Bunny's Baby Boomers
Bugs Bunny's Thanksgiving Diet	November 15, 1979	Rabbit Every Monday; Stop! Look! And Hasten!; Guided Muscle; Beep, Beep!; Tweet Dreams; Birds Anonymous; Freudy Cat; Canned Feud; Trip For Tat; Bedevilled Rabbit	Released as part of the Looney Tunes Holiday Triple Feature DVD.
The Bugs Bunny Mystery Special	October 26, 1980	Baby Buggy Bunny; Big House Bunny; Bugs and Thugs; Hare Lift; Operation: Rabbit; Compressed Hare; Catty Cornered	Only released on VHS in 1992 by Warner Home Video under its original title.
Daffy Duck's Thanks-for-Giving Special	November 20, 1980	The Scarlet Pumpernickel; His Bitter Half; Robin Hood Daffy; Drip-Along Daffy	Contains one all-new short; Released as part of the Looney Tunes Holiday Triple Feature
Bugs Bunny: All American Hero	May 21, 1981	Yankee Doodle Bugs; Bunker Hill Bunny; Dumb Patrol; The Rebel Without Claws; Ballot Box Bunny; Southern Fried Rabbit	Only released on VHS in 1994 by Warner Home Video under its original title.
Bugs Bunny's Mad World of Television	January 11, 1982	What's Up, Doc?; Tree Cornered Tweety; Past Perfumance; The Ducksters; Wideo Wabbit; This Is a Life?	Only released on VHS in 1993 by Warner Home Video under its original title.
Bugs vs. Daffy: Battle of the Music Video Stars	October 21, 1988	Porky's Poppa; Porky's Poor Fish; Shake Your Powder Puff; Scrap Happy Daffy; Have You Got Any Castles; Boobs in the Woods; The Fifth-Column Mouse; The Wearing of the Grin; Tweet Tweet Tweety; Tweety's Circus; A Scent of the Matterhorn; Hot Cross Bunny; Daffy Duck Hunt; Robot Rabbit; Yankee Doodle Daffy; Naughty Neighbors; Bosko's Picture Show; Polar Pals; The Fair-Haired Hare; What Price Porky; Daffy's Southern Exposure	One of the first specials produced by Warner Bros. where new animation was both traditionally and digitally inked and painted. Released on DVD with the Space Jam 2-disc DVD set.
Bugs Bunny's Wild World of Sports	February 15, 1989	My Bunny Lies Over the Sea; Sport Chumpions; 14 Carrot Rabbit; High Diving Hare; Upswept Hare; Muscle Tussle; To Duck or Not to Duck; Frigid Hare; Bad Ol' Putty Tat; Rabbit Fire; Bunny Hugged; Gone Batty; Lovelorn Leghorn; The Leghorn Blows at Midnight; Little Boy Boo	Included in The Essential Bugs Bunny DVD, released on October 12, 2010 in the U.S.
Bugs Bunny's Overtures to Disaster	April 17, 1991	What's Opera, Doc?; Rabbit of Seville; Baton Bunny; Back Alley Oproar*	Contains one all-new Porky and Daffy short titled The William Tell Overture. *At the time of release Warner Bros had not regained the rights to their pre-1948 cartoons yet, so Greg Ford and his crew reanimated those shorts for its inclusion in this special. Only released on VHS in 1994 by Warner Home Video under its original title.
Bugs Bunny's Creature Features	February 1, 1992	Invasion of the Bunny Snatchers; The Duxorcist; Night of the Living Duck	Contains three cartoons originally theatrically released in 1988 as a part of the Daffy Duck's Quackbusters compilation feature. The original individual shorts were released on the 2-disc DVD release of Space Jam.
Bugs Bunny's Lunar Tunes	March 1, 1993	Haredevil Hare; Duck Dodgers in the 24½th Century; No Parking Hare; Lighter Than Hare; Boyhood Daze; There Auto Be a Law; The Hole Idea; Lumber Jerks; Rocket-bye Baby; Martian Through Georgia; A Kiddies Kitty; The Hasty Hare; Hare-Way to the Stars	Released straight to VHS. It was later released on the DVD "Bugs Bunny's Lunar Tunes Marvin the Martian Space Tunes" Double Feature.

== Home Video Retitling ==
Several of these TV specials were given a new name when released on video.

TV title	Home video title
Carnival of the Animals	Bugs and Daffy's Carnival of the Animals
Bugs Bunny's Easter Special	Bugs Bunny's Easter Funnies
A Connecticut Rabbit in King Arthur's Court	Bugs Bunny in King Arthur's Court
Bugs Bunny's Valentine	Bugs Bunny's Cupid Capers
Daffy Duck's Easter Show	Daffy Duck's Easter Egg-citement

== See also ==
- Looney Tunes and Merrie Melodies filmography
- Looney Tunes
- Merrie Melodies
- Looney Tunes Golden Collection
