= Bugs vs. Daffy: Battle of the Music Video Stars =

1988 American television special

- Written by: Greg Ford; Terry Lennon
- Directed by: Greg Ford; Terry Lennon
- Starring: Mel Blanc (voices)
- Country of origin: United States
- Original language: English

Production
- Producers: Steven S. Greene; Katherine Helppie-Shipley
- Running time: 23 min.
- Production company: Warner Bros. Animation

Original release
- Network: CBS
- Release: October 21, 1988

Related
- Bugs Bunny's Mad World of Television (1982); Bugs Bunny's Wild World of Sports (1989)

Bugs vs. Daffy: Battle of the Music Video Stars is a 1988 animated television special broadcast on CBS on October 21, 1988. The story revolves around two competing television stations that show music videos from classic Looney Tunes shorts. The stations are hosted by Bugs Bunny (WABBIT) and Daffy Duck (KPUT). This special aired after This Is America, Charlie Brown: The Mayflower Voyagers.

It was one of the first specials produced by Warner Bros. where new animation was both traditionally and digitally inked and painted. It was also the first Looney Tunes television special to be broadcast in stereo, with the exception of the classic cartoon footage. It can be found in the Adventures section of the Space Jam 2-disc box set.

== Plot ==
After the title is announced, we cut to a VJ Bugs at the end of "In Old Indiana". He runs the highly successful music video TV station WABBIT. He then plays his "highly requested" song "Home on the Range". We then leave the city where WABBIT is to the woods, where Daffy's music video TV station KPUT is. Daffy plays "Sunrise in Nutzville", then displays his disgust for WABBIT because they have higher ratings. On a television screen (above is a picture labeled the Nielsens, but the family in the picture is not yet seen), a hand changes the station to WABBIT.

After the commercial break, Bugs and Daffy deliver their signature songs "What's Up, Doc?" and "Oh, People Call Me Daffy!". Then, Bugs presents "The Songs of the 1930s", which displays songs from the 1930s Looney Tunes. He plays "Those Were Wonderful Days" and describes how some of the best music came from Vaudeville, using a song from the Bunny Sisters as an example. On his break, Daffy is clueless at watching Bugs do his radio show with "no panache, no charisma". He sees "We're in the Money", then his break is over. He has a caller service giveaway for a free T-shirt and free copy of his disco album. He then rips off WABBIT on KPUT by presenting his own golden oldie "We Watch the Skyways" before the same hand changes the channel. Bugs presents a back-to-back tribute to Porky Pig with his debut single "Porky's Poppa Has a Farm", his imaginative videos, and his duet with Petunia Pig. Watching this, Daffy is disgusted. He then delivers a trivia question: "Whose musical talent combined the upper-beat level of bluegrass music with the intoxicating Latin rhythm of salsa?" He is the answer to that, and then plays the song "Banjo Chicky-Boom", the song for said answer. He is dead last in his competition ratings, then shows lament before the same hand changes the channel again.

After the commercial break, Bugs displays "The Songs of WWII" with songs "We Did It Before" and "Any Bonds Today?". Daffy then rips off WABBIT once more, saying that "those bigshots at WABBIT would have you believe that us ducks did nothing but sit on our tail feathers during World War II". He then plays "We're In to Win" before being changed by the hand. Bugs then plays "Gee Whiz Willigans", which infuriates Daffy. He then jams WABBIT with a drum solo of his from The Bugs Bunny Show. Bugs jams KPUT right back with "The Old Soft Shoe", with a confused Daffy jamming Bugs back with "I Can't Get Along, Little Dogie" by Yosemite Sam. They then jam each other back-to-back with songs by Tweety ("Wee Widdle Bird") and Sylvester ("Pussycat's Parade"). They then resort to holidays like Valentine's Day, Halloween, Columbus Day, St. Patrick's Day, The 4th of July, and Christmas.

The Nielsen Family Ratings come in, and Daffy announces the show canceled. But then, he asks who the Nielsen Family is. The hand (which is from the Nielsen family) switches to WABBIT. The family is revealed to be a family of rabbits. Bugs gives a shout-out to the Nielsens, saying, "It helps to have a lot of relatives". The Old Soft Shoe video plays over the end credits.

== Trivia ==
- The theme music for WABBIT is the "What's Up, Doc?" score that played over numerous Bugs Bunny cartoon title cards.
- The Nielsen family spoofs the Nielsen ratings for television that conducts ratings studies.
- The only video sources that appear twice are Yankee Doodle Daffy, The Fair-Haired Hare, and the short-lived program The Bugs Bunny Show.
- The 6 minutes of new animation were digitally painted by Allied Visual Artists, using three of the first low-cost electronic paintboxes in the industry, manufactured by the now defunct Inovion company of Utah, USA. Paintbox output was transferred to film via a Polaroid Freeze Frame and experimental Double M film recorder. This digital setup did not offer any camera motion.

=== Clips used ===
- Robot Rabbit ("In Old Indiana" audio clip, new animation of Bugs and Elmer singing on TV)
- The Fair-Haired Hare ("Home on the Range", "I Can't Get Along, Little Dogie")
- Dough for the Do-Do ("Sunrise in Nutzville")
- What's Up, Doc? ("What's Up, Doc?")
- Boobs in the Woods ("Oh, People Call Me Daffy")
- Those Were Wonderful Days ("Those Were Wonderful Days")
- Shake Your Powder Puff ("Shake Your Powder Puff")
- Bosko's Picture Show ("We're in the Money")
- Yankee Doodle Daffy ("We Watch the Skyways", "Boom-Chicky-Boom")
- Polar Pals ("Let's Rub Noses Like the Eskimoses")
- Porky's Poor Fish ("Porky's Fish Store")
- Naughty Neighbors ("Would You Like To Take a Walk?")
- The Fifth-Column Mouse ("We Did It Before")
- Any Bonds Today? ("Any Bonds Today?")
- Scrap Happy Daffy ("We're In to Win")
- Hot Cross Bunny ("The Old Soft Shoe")
- Tweet Tweet Tweety ("Wee Widdle Bird")
- Tweety's Circus ("Pussycat's Parade")
- A Scent of the Matterhorn ("Tiptoe Through the Tulips")
- Have You Got Any Castles? ("Halloween Gavotte")
- Hare We Go ("Columbus Day Rag")
- The Wearing of the Grin ("Irish Jig")
- Bunker Hill Bunny ("Yankee Doodle")
- Daffy Duck Hunt ("Jingle Bells")
