= Bugs Bunny's Easter Special =

1977 American television special

- Story by: David Detiege; Friz Freleng
- Directed by: Friz Freleng
- Voices of: Mel Blanc; June Foray
- Composers: Milt Franklyn; Doug Goodwin; William Lava; John Seely; Carl W. Stalling
- Country of origin: United States
- Original language: English

Production
- Executive producers: Hal Geer; William L. Hendricks
- Editor: Rick Steward
- Running time: 50 minutes
- Production company: DePatie–Freleng Enterprises

Original release
- Network: CBS
- Release: April 7, 1977

Bugs Bunny's Easter Special (also known as The Bugs Bunny Easter Special and Bugs Bunny's Easter Funnies) is a 1977 Easter-themed Looney Tunes television special directed by Friz Freleng and features clips from 10 Warner Bros. cartoons. It originally aired on the CBS network April 7, 1977.

== Plot ==
The Easter Bunny has fallen ill and Granny must find a replacement in time for Easter. She sets her sights on Bugs Bunny, believing him to be the perfect candidate. Upon reaching the Warner Bros. studio, she discovers that Bugs has a full schedule, but he promises to help her find a solution. Daffy Duck eagerly offers his services, but his attempts to help are marred by his strange choice of Easter-themed outfits.

Bugs proposes other Looney Tunes characters to play the Easter Bunny, but none of them are available or suitable for the job. He then offers to take on the role if Easter is postponed by a week. Just then, the Easter Bunny makes a surprising entrance, appearing to be fully recovered. In a twist, the "Easter Bunny" turns out to be Daffy in disguise; Granny and Bugs claim that they knew this all along.

== Cast ==
- Mel Blanc as Bugs Bunny, Daffy Duck/the Easter Bunny, Porky Pig, Tweety, Sylvester, Pepé Le Pew, Yosemite Sam, and Foghorn Leghorn
- June Foray as Granny

== Featured cartoons ==
- Knighty Knight Bugs (Friz Freleng; August 23, 1958)
- Hillbilly Hare (Robert McKimson; August 12, 1950)
- Bully For Bugs (Chuck Jones; August 8, 1953)
- Tweety's Circus (Friz Freleng; June 4, 1955)
- Birds Anonymous (Friz Freleng; August 10, 1957)
- For Scent-imental Reasons (Chuck Jones; November 12, 1949)
- Rabbit of Seville (Chuck Jones; December 16, 1950)
- Little Boy Boo (Robert McKimson; June 5, 1954)
- Robin Hood Daffy (Chuck Jones; March 8, 1958)
- Sahara Hare (Friz Freleng; March 26, 1955)

All of the shorts in the film were from after 1948, as Warner Bros. had sold the earlier cartoons to Associated Artists Productions and would not reacquire them until 1996. As such, Bugs's earlier, ill-fated attempt to substitute for the Easter Bunny (in 1947's Easter Yeggs) is unmentioned, and the Easter Bunny bears no resemblance to his appearance in that film.

== Home media ==
This special was released on DVD on February 16, 2010.

== See also ==
- List of Easter television episodes
