= Bewitched Bunny =

1954 animated short film by Chuck Jones

- Title card
- Directed by: Charles M. Jones
- Story by: Michael Maltese
- Starring: Mel Blanc; Bea Benaderet (uncredited)
- Music by: Carl Stalling
- Animation by: Lloyd Vaughan; Ken Harris; Ben Washam; Abe Levitow (uncredited)
- Layouts by: Maurice Noble
- Backgrounds by: Philip DeGuard
- Color process: Technicolor
- Production company: Warner Bros. Cartoons
- Distributed by: Warner Bros. Pictures; The Vitaphone Corporation
- Release date: July 24, 1954
- Running time: 6:56
- Language: English

Bewitched Bunny is a 1954 Warner Bros. Looney Tunes cartoon directed by Chuck Jones and written by Michael Maltese. The short was released on July 24, 1954, and stars Bugs Bunny. Jones created the character Witch Hazel who debuted in this cartoon.

Witch Hazel later appeared in Broom-Stick Bunny (1956), A Witch's Tangled Hare (1959), and in A-Haunting We Will Go (1966). She also has a brief cameo appearance in Transylvania 6-5000 (1963).

== Plot ==
The cartoon begins with Bugs Bunny reading the classic fairy tale Hansel and Gretel while walking through a forest. Witch Hazel plays the witch who tries to cook and eat the titular children (her cookbook has such recipes as "Waif Waffles", "Moppet Muffins", "Kiddie Kippers", "Children Chops", and "Smorgas Boy"). Bugs witnesses Hazel coaxing the children inside, and comments that "this looks like a job for the Masked Avenger", but since he is not around, Bugs enters her house, disguised as a truant officer, under the pretense of inspection. He is perplexed by Hansel's name but saves the children from Hazel's clutches. Hansel and Gretel both turn to Hazel as they leave and say in a thick German accent: "Ach – your mother rides a vacuum cleaner!" Once Hazel realizes that Bugs is a rabbit, she tries to cook him instead, using a carrot (hollowed out and filled with a sleeping potion) as a lure. Bugs eats the carrot and falls asleep and Hazel puts him into a roasting pan to make rabbit stew.

After the witch goes down into the basement to get something, a man resembling Prince Charming enters the house and kisses Bugs's hand, causing the rabbit to wake up and say: "You're looking for Snow White. This here's the story of HAHHN-sel and Gretel", and the Prince leaves, also perplexed by Hansel's name. Hazel then emerges from the basement and Bugs races down a nearby hallway to escape, but is cornered by her. As she approaches, Bugs discovers a grenade filled with Hazel's magic powder (in a case marked with the message "In case of emergency break glass") and uses it to transform her into a gorgeous blonde-furred, blue-eyed rabbit who still has Hazel's laugh. As he leaves with her, Bugs looks at the audience, breaking the fourth wall, and comments: "Ah sure, I know. But aren't they all witches inside?"

== Cast ==
- Mel Blanc as Bugs Bunny, Hansel and Prince Charming
- Bea Benaderet as Witch Hazel, Gretel and Female Rabbit (uncredited)

== Controversy ==
This cartoon caused some controversy in Canada due to Bugs's ending line about Witch Hazel being turned into a rabbit being perceived as misogynistic. And Bugs's closing line, "Ah sure, I know, but aren't they all witches inside?" was edited out of commercial broadcasts in the 1980s, and was replaced in later versions with "Sure uh, I know, but after all, who wants to be alone on Halloween?", which was the re-dubbed line for the ending of Bewitched Bunny after it was repurposed in 1977's Bugs Bunny's Howl-oween Special. This controversy was briefly mentioned by Eric Goldberg on the DVD commentary of the fifth volume of the Looney Tunes Golden Collection DVD set. However, the original version has been aired in Canada as recently as 2015 on the Canadian cable channel Teletoon Retro.

== Home media ==
Bewitched Bunny is available on the second disc of Looney Tunes Golden Collection: Volume 5, the second disc of Looney Tunes Spotlight Collection: Volume 5, and the second disc of Looney Tunes Platinum Collection: Volume 1.

== See also ==
- List of films about witchcraft
- Lola Bunny

Preceded by Devil May Hare	Bugs Bunny Cartoons; 1954	Succeeded by Yankee Doodle Bugs
