= Bugs Bunny's Howl-oween Special =

- Story by: Cliff Roberts; John Dunn; Warren Foster; Michael Maltese; Tedd Pierce
- Directed by: David Detiege; Friz Freleng; Chuck Jones; Abe Levitow; Robert McKimson; Maurice Noble
- Voices of: Mel Blanc; June Foray
- Composers: Milt Franklyn; William Lava; Harper MacKay; Carl Stalling
- Country of origin: United States
- Original language: English

Production
- Executive producer: Hal Geer
- Editor: Jim Champin
- Running time: 30 minutes
- Production company: Warner Bros. Pictures

Original release
- Network: CBS
- Release: October 26, 1977

Related
- Bugs Bunny in Space; Bugs Bunny in King Arthur's Court

Bugs Bunny's Howl-oween Special is a Looney Tunes animated Halloween television special directed by David Detiege, which first aired on CBS on October 26, 1977.

The special includes clips from nine Looney Tunes and Merrie Melodies theatrical shorts originally released between 1948 and 1966, including all four cartoons featuring Witch Hazel as the primary antagonist. Similarly to other Looney Tunes television specials of this era, the clips from classic cartoons are linked together with newly produced animation and redubbed dialogue when necessary.

== Plot ==
Daffy Duck's skepticism is piqued when his nephew shares an eerie encounter with Witch Hazel during a Halloween escapade. Concurrently, Bugs Bunny, masquerading as Daffy's nephew, becomes entangled in Witch Hazel's bewitching invitation for tea. Amidst their exchange, Bugs departs to extol the virtues of his purportedly superior doctor's brew, ultimately encountering Dr. Jekyll's transformative potion.

As Bugs unwittingly imbibes the elixir, he metamorphoses into a monstrous guise, prompting Witch Hazel's misconstrued assumption of a mere costume. Her subsequent endeavor to ensnare Bugs, culminating in a chase to an ancient castle, unveils her comically futile pursuit. Subsequently, Witch Hazel, seeking respite from her witchly duties, transmutes Speedy Gonzales into her doppelgänger, inadvertently instigating a series of comedic misadventures.

Additional Halloween festivities unfold with a series of fantastical encounters, including Daffy's transformation into an anomalous creature, and Sylvester's struggle to communicate a looming threat to Porky Pig amidst supernatural perils. Amidst the chaos, Bugs's disillusionment with Witch Hazel's enchantments leads to a pivotal exchange wherein he relinquishes the transformative elixir, thereby catalyzing a whimsical transformation of the witch into a vampire.

Bugs's resourcefulness, exemplified through his adept utilization of magical spells, culminates in the restoration of Witch Hazel to her original form. However, her retaliatory pursuit prompts a clever evasion by Bugs, who ingeniously utilizes an emergency cache of magical powder to ultimately transform the witch into a fellow bunny.

The tale concludes with a festive celebration between Bugs and the newly transformed Witch Hazel, underscored by a lighthearted exchange regarding the seasoning of the cauldron's contents, symbolizing their shared camaraderie amidst the Halloween festivities.

== Cast ==
- Mel Blanc as Bugs Bunny, Daffy Duck, Porky Pig, Sylvester J. Pussycat, Tweety Bird, Speedy Gonzales, Daffy's nephew, Dr. Jekyll/Mr. Hyde
- June Foray and Bea Benaderet as Witch Hazel, female bunny

== Credits ==
- Classic cartoons directed by Friz Freleng, Chuck Jones, Abe Levitow, Robert McKimson and Maurice Noble.
- Directed by David Detiege.
- Executive producer Hal Geer.

== Featured cartoons ==
- A-Haunting We Will Go (1966)
- Broom-Stick Bunny (1956)
- Hyde and Hare (1955)
- Hyde and Go Tweet (1960)
- A Witch's Tangled Hare (1959)
- Claws for Alarm (1954)
- Scaredy Cat (1948)
- Transylvania 6-5000 (1963)
- Bewitched Bunny (1954)

== Home video ==
- The special was released on VHS in 1994, and reissued on DVD in 2010 with the 1946 Bugs Bunny short Hair-Raising Hare as a bonus DVD feature. In 2020, it was re-issued on DVD in the Looney Tunes: Holiday Triple Feature collection alongside Bah, Humduck! A Looney Tunes Christmas and Bugs Bunny's Thanksgiving Diet.

== See also ==
- List of films set around Halloween
- Daffy Duck's Quackbusters
