= Bugs Bunny Builders =

American animated television series

- Genre: Adventure; Educational; Comedy
- Based on: Looney Tunes by Warner Bros.
- Developed by: Jacob Fleisher
- Voices of: Eric Bauza; Chandni Parekh; Bob Bergen; Jeff Bergman; Fred Tatasciore; Candi Milo
- Opening theme: "Bugs Bunny Builders" by Matthew Janszen
- Composer: Matthew Janszen
- Country of origin: United States
- Original language: English
- No. of seasons: 2
- No. of episodes: 80

Production
- Executive producer: Sam Register
- Producer: Nicole Belisle
- Editor: Colin Sittig
- Running time: 11 minutes
- Production company: Warner Bros. Animation (Note: Animation services provided by Snipple Animation Studios and Digital eMation Inc.)

Original release
- Network: Cartoon Network (season 1); Max (season 2)
- Release: July 25, 2022 – present

Related
- List of Looney Tunes television series

Bugs Bunny Builders is an American preschool animated television series produced by Warner Bros. Animation, based on the characters from Looney Tunes. The series premiered on July 25, 2022, on Cartoon Network on their Cartoonito preschool block and was released on July 26 on HBO Max. It is the second pre-school program in the Looney Tunes cartoon franchise, following Baby Looney Tunes in 2002.

Season 2 premiered on Max on March 26, 2024, and later premiered on Cartoonito in April 2024.

== Plot ==
The Looney Builders, managed by Bugs Bunny, help their friends and neighbors around the town of Looneyburg. By working together as a team, Lola Bunny, Daffy Duck, Porky Pig, Tweety, and others use their tools and wild vehicles to pull off construction jobs together.

== Characters ==
=== Main ===
- Bugs Bunny (voiced by Eric Bauza) ‒ The Looney Builders' leader and backhoe operator.
- Lola Bunny (voiced by Chandni Parekh) ‒ The Looney Builders' planner and bulldozer operator.
- Daffy Duck (voiced by Eric Bauza) ‒ The Looney Builders' dump truck operator.
- Porky Pig (voiced by Bob Bergen) ‒ The Looney Builders' steamroller operator.
- Tweety (voiced by Eric Bauza) ‒ The Looney Builders' crane operator.

=== Recurring ===
- Petunia Pig (voiced by Alex Cazares) ‒ The Looney Builders' mechanic.
- Wile E. Coyote (voiced by Keith Ferguson) ‒ A scientist who would help the Looney Builders with his high-tech equipment at times.
- Sylvester (voiced by Jeff Bergman) ‒ A skilled painter.
- Foghorn Leghorn (voiced by Jeff Bergman) ‒ The mayor of Looneyburg.
- Taz (voiced by Fred Tatasciore) – A Tasmanian devil.
- Sniffles (voiced by Dawson Griffin) ‒ A young mouse who is seen playing with the other young characters.
- Eggbert (voiced by Luke Lowe) ‒ A bespectacled chick. He was originally a mute character for decades, but now has speaking roles in this series.
- Looney Kangaroo Kid (voiced by Debi Derryberry and Sky Alexis) ‒ A kangaroo joey. The character was originally male, but is made female in this series.
- Pouncy (voiced by Riley King) ‒ A tuxedo kitten who acts like a leader of the kids' group. Originally a mute character until she speaks, and now plays a major and supporting role in this series.
- Moxie Manatee (voiced by Mallory Jansen) ‒ A teacher who teaches aquatic animals at the undersea school.
- Marvin the Martian (voiced by Eric Bauza) – An extraterrestrial alien.
- K-9 (voiced by Fred Tatasciore) – Marvin's pet alien dog.
- Road Runner (voiced by Paul Julian in archival recordings) - A roadrunner who lives in the desert.
- Mac and Tosh (voiced by Max Mittelman and Noshir Dalal, respectively) – A pair of polite gophers.

=== Guests ===
- Penelope Pussycat (voiced by Salli Saffioti) ‒ A tuxedo cat fashion designer.
- Speedy Gonzales (voiced by Raul Ceballos) ‒ A fast mouse soccer player.
- Prince Lionel (voiced by Piotr Michael) – A lion, noted as the king of England.
- Pete Puma (voiced by John Kassir) – A puma.
- Sam Sheepdog (voiced by Fred Tatasciore) – A sheepdog.
- Yoyo Dodo (voiced by Frank Todaro) – A wacky dodo bird.

== Episodes ==
=== Series overview ===
Season	Episodes	Originally released	
Season	Episodes	First released	Last released
1	39	July 25, 2022	December 1, 2023
2	40	March 25, 2024	December 8, 2025

=== Season 1 (2022–23) ===
No.	Title	Directed by	Written by	Storyboarded by	Original release date	Prod. code	U.S. viewers (millions)
1	"Splash Zone"	Joey Adams	Story by : Nicole Belisle; Teleplay by : Laura Bowes	Michelle Rincon Eloren & Chelsea Holt	July 25, 2022 (Note: Originally uploaded to YouTube on July 22, 2022)	101	N/A
Mayor Foghorn Leghorn hires the Looney Builders to build a giant water slide for Looneyburg's waterpark. He keeps adding onto the design with the support of Bugs until problems arise.
2	"Ice Creamed"	Lindsey Pollard	Story by : Nicole Belisle; Teleplay by : Sam Bissonnette	Katie Hood	July 25, 2022	102	N/A
It is Taz's birthday, so The Looney Builders build him a huge ice cream sundae. Porky worries about making a mistake and delays the build causing the ice cream to melt.
3	"Race Track Race"	Abe Audish	Story by : Jake Fleisher; Teleplay by : Ade Audish	Chelsea Holt & Brittany McCarthy	July 25, 2022	103	0.132
The Looney Builders race against the clock to build Cecil Turtle a new racetrack. Daffy gets caught up in his own desire to race and changes part of the build.
4	"Dino Fight"	Joey Adams	Nicole Belisle	Alec Megibben	July 25, 2022	104	N/A
George P. Mandrake hires The Looney Builders to build a T. Rex fossil. It is Tweety's job to place the bones with his crane, but his fear of the big dino affects his ability to get the job done.
5	"Snow Cap"	Joey Adams	Sam Bissonnette	Alec Megibben	July 25, 2022	105	0.091
Pauleen Penguin hires The Looney Builders to build her a home in Looneyburg. Lola soon discovers that they got the design wrong and the crew has to make adjustments.
6	"Tweety-Go-Round"	Andy Thom	Laura Bowes	Brittany McCarthy & Chelsea Holt	July 25, 2022	106	0.106
Tweety leads The Looney Builders in building a new merry-go-round at the park for the kids. His crane breaks down and his small size affects his ability to contribute to the build.
7	"Smash House"	Joey Adams	Sarah Nerboso	Michelle Rincon Eloren	July 25, 2022	107	0.068
The Looney Builders learn that Taz accidentally destroyed his house, so they set out to build him a new one that is smash-proof.
8	"Play Day"	Andy Thom	Sam Bissonnette	Ian Mutchler	July 25, 2022	108	N/A
When the Looney Builders build themselves a playground, Daffy gets so excited about his section that he takes all the supplies for himself.
9	"Rock On"	Andy Thom	Nicole Belisle	Clint Taylor	September 26, 2022	109	N/A
The Looney Builders are hired by Mac and Tosh Gopher to build them a home underground. Daffy cannot remove rocks from the area fast enough and fails to ask for help.
10	"Buzz In"	Lindsay Pollard	Jo Claes	Alycia White & Chelsea Holt	September 27, 2022	110	N/A
Bizzy Buzzard's mom hires The Looney Builders to build her family a new nest. Bizzy wants to help, but keeps getting in the way, and she ends up creating all sorts of problems for the crew.
11	"Stories"	Lindsay Pollard	Christian Marsh Reiman	Katie Hood & Chelsea Holt	September 28, 2022	111	N/A
The Looney Builders are hired by Hoots Talon to expand and paint the old library. They enlist master painter Sylvester who faces his fear of heights with his build buddy, Tweety.
12	"Cheesy Peasy"	Lindsay Pollard	Nicole Belisle	Alycia White & Chelsea Holt	September 29, 2022	112	N/A
The Looney Builders are hired by the Mouse Sisters to build a bridge over a mac and cheese spill. Lola turns the job into a game which results in the crew losing sight of the bigger goal.
13	"Looney Science"	Joey Adams	Jo Claes	Alec Megibben & Chelsea Holt	September 30, 2022	113	N/A
The Looney Builders build a science museum in the desert where Wile E. Coyote becomes distracted by the Road Runner.
14	"Big Feet"	Andy Thom	Kevin Fleming & Rob Janas	Brittany McCarthy & Chelsea Holt	October 31, 2022	114	0.086
Mayor Leghorn hires The Looney Builders to build a water wheel in the forest where Porky worries about a mythical creature named "Big Feet."
15	"Squirreled Away"	Lindsay Pollard	Aydrea Walden	Alycia White & Chelsea Holt	November 1, 2022	115	N/A
The Looney Builders build Tibs Squirrel a closet in his tree, but it will not fit all of Tibs' stuff and he does not want to get rid of anything.
16	"Beach Battle"	Joey Adams	Sam Bissonnette	Michelle Rincon Eloren & Chelsea Holt	November 2, 2022	116	N/A
When The Looney Builders enter a sandcastle building contest, Tweety sees the competition and loses confidence in his idea.
17	"Game Time"	Lindsay Pollard	Kevin Fleming & Rob Janas	Katie Hood & Chelsea Holt	November 3, 2022	117	N/A
Chef Hector hires The Looney Builders to build him a burger restaurant, but Daffy is so focused on beating his handheld game that he causes major setbacks.
18	"Soup Up"	Andy Thom	Laura Bowes	Ian Mutchler & Chelsea Holt	November 4, 2022	118	N/A
As The Looney Builders help Petunia build a greenhouse, she cannot wait for the veggies to grow and does everything she can to speed up the process.
19	"Looneyburg Lights"	Lindsey Pollard	Laura Bowes	Alec Megibben; Alycia White & Chelsea Holt	December 5, 2022	119	N/A
The Looney Builders prepare to host a big holiday lights festival in Looneyburg Park when an unexpected snowstorm prevents Looneyburgers from attending, so they need to come up with a plan to prevent the event from being cancelled.
20	"Blast Off"	Joey Adams	Kevin Fleming & Rob Janas	Michelle Rincon Eloren & Chelsea Holt	April 17, 2023	121	0.63
When Marvin the Martian crash lands in Looneyburg, he is in a hurry to leave and hires The Looney Builders to build him a spaceship.
21	"K-9: Space Puppy"	Andy Thom	Kevin Fleming & Rob Janas	Ian Mutchler & Chelsea Holt	April 17, 2023	122	N/A
Marvin the Martian hires The Looney Builders to build a doghouse on Mars for his puppy, K-9 Daffy soon bonds with K-9 and comes up with a plan to prolong their playtime.
22	"Cousin Billy"	Lindsey Pollard	Sam Bissonnette	Alycia White & Chelsea Holt	April 17, 2023	123	N/A
When Daffy’s cool cousin Billy hires The Looney Builders to build her an art studio, Daffy tries to show off to prove how cool he is.
23	"Cheddar Days"	Lindsey Pollard	Jo Claes	Katie Hood	April 17, 2023	124	N/A
The Mouse Sisters hire The Looney Builders to build a cheese café featuring a mural by Sylvester who is having a bad day.
24	"Taz Recycle"	Joey Adams	Sam Bissonnette	Alec Megibben & Carrie Hankins	April 17, 2023	125	0.07
When The Looney Builders build Taz a wrecking ball vehicle, he struggles to learn how to operate it.
25	"Sea School"	Lindsey Pollard	Sam Bissonnette	Katie Hood & Chelsea Holt	June 5, 2023	126	N/A
The Looney Crew help their walrus teacher friend build a new school for sea creature kids.
26	"Underwater Star"	Lindsey Pollard	Kevin Fleming & Rob Janas	Alycia White & Chelsea Holt	June 5, 2023	127	N/A
When the underwater school is holding the first race games, Lola ends up getting excited and shrugs off her own crews' advice from the situations on the obstacle course.
27	"Party Boat"	Andy Thom	Cassie Soliday	Ian Mutchler & Carrie Hankins	June 12, 2023	128	0.102
The crew helps the gophers build a boat but Tweety accidentally makes a crack and does not ask the busy crew for help.
28	"Mail Whale"	Joey Adams	Laura Bowes	Michelle Rincon Eloren & Chelsea Holt	June 19, 2023	129	N/A
When Winston the Mail Whale needs a new mail truck to deliver his mail, the crew try to build one but it makes a mess of it due to him not working part of a team.
29	"Bright Light"	Andy Thom	Joe Morgan	Brittany McCarthy & Chelsea Holt	June 26, 2023	130	0.052
The mayor asks the crew to build a lighthouse for the arrival of Mac and Tosh riding in a boat at night. Lola’s tablet is broken and she must rely on herself.
30	"Mini Golf"	Lindsey Pollard	Jo Claes	Katie Hood	August 7, 2023	131	N/A
When the final hole was shown to unchallengeable, the crew decided to make a new one that is far more challenging and exciting.
31	"Goofballs"	Joey Adams	Story by : Laura Bowes; Teleplay by : Nicole Belisle & Laura Bowes	Alec Megibben & Chelsea Holt	August 14, 2023	132	N/A
The crew helps the goofy beaver twins build them a new house when the pair distracts them with their happy playful nature.
32	"Skate Park"	Andy Thom	Sam Bissonnette	Brittany McCarthy & Chelsea Holt	August 21, 2023	133	N/A
The kids are in need of a new skate park when Hoots and his group get into their way with him and his group get their activities in the way.
33	"Batty Kathy"	Andy Thom	Sarah Nerboso	Brittany McCarthy & Chelsea Holt	August 28, 2023	134	N/A
The crew finds it difficult when they are hired by Kathy Bat to build a radio station on a ceiling. Porky has concerns but does not speak up.
34	"Honey Bunny"	Andy Thom	Kevin Fleming & Rob Janas	Ian Mutchler	September 4, 2023	135	N/A
The crew helps the bees build a new machine until Bugs is struggling following just one rule.
35	"Castle Hassle"	Joey Adams	Katie Mattila	Alec Megibben & Chelsea Holt	November 27, 2023	136	N/A
Prince Lionel of England dares to boss our heroes around instead of helping.
36	"Catwalk"	Lindsay Pollard	Laura Bowes	Alycia White & Carrie Hankins	November 28, 2023	137	N/A
The crew builds a fun and fabulous runway for Penelope Pussycat in France.
37	"Dim Sum"	Kim Le	Gloria Shen	Brittany McCarthy & Chelsea Holt	November 29, 2023	138	N/A
Bugs worries about letting down his favorite chef, Chef Poyung Panda in China.
38	"Crane Game"	Lindsay Pollard	Annie Nishida	Katie Hood	November 30, 2023	139	N/A
Tweety learns to sacrifice his favorite claw Clawdio, with Chibi Critter, in Japan.
39	"Speedy"	Joey Adams	Megan Gonzalez	Michelle Rincon Eloren & Chelsea Holt	December 1, 2023	140	N/A
In Mexico, some things take time, with Speedy Gonzalez.

=== Shorts (2022) ===
No.	Title	Directed by	Original release date	Prod. code	U.S. viewers (millions)
1	"Haunted Garage!"	Brianna Chiong	October 27, 2022 (YouTube); October 31, 2022 (Cartoonito)	TBA	N/A
It is Halloween, so the crew decorates their garage for the Looneyburg trick-or-treaters.
2	"Bugs Bunny Boogie"	Brianna Chong	January 2, 2023 (Note: This short was originally scheduled for November 28, 2022, but was pulled before it aired)	TBA	N/A
Bugs Bunny uses his excavator to dance.
3	"Buckle Up"	Brianna Chong	January 9, 2023 (Note: This short was originally scheduled for December 5, 2022, but was pulled before it aired)	TBA	N/A
A music video of Lola Bunny knowing how to make things right.
4	"Lunar New Year"	Brianna Chong	January 17, 2023	TBA	N/A
The crew celebrates the Lunar New Year and Bugs and Lola go missing during the Lion Dance.
5	"Porky Perfect"	Brianna Chong	January 23, 2023 (Note: This short was originally scheduled for December 12, 2022, but was pulled before it aired)	TBA	N/A
A music video of Porky Pig and how he gets things neat and organized.
6	"Awesome Duck"	Brianna Chong	January 30, 2023 (Note: This short was originally scheduled for December 19, 2022, but was pulled before it aired)	TBA	N/A
A music video of Daffy Duck using his dump truck to haul supplies and goof around on the job.
7	"Don't Be Fooled By His Size"	Brianna Chong	February 6, 2023	TBA	N/A
Tweety Bird uses his crane to lift stuff in this music video as he helps his crew get the job done.
8	"Hard Hat Time"	Brianna Chong	February 13, 2023	TBA	N/A
An action-packed music video of The Looney Builders traveling across land, air, and sea to get the job done.
9	"Boogie Button"	Brianna Chong	March 20, 2023	TBA	N/A
Bugs tries to play music for the crew on their lunch break, but his boogie button is busted.
10	"Lunch Break"	Brianna Chong	April 24, 2023	TBA	N/A
Porky Pig is ready to chow down on his yummy sandwich when he keeps getting asked to help the other Looney Builders in their own tasks!
11	"Daffy’s Spa"	Brianna Chong	May 22, 2023	TBA	N/A
Daffy invites everyone to take a relaxing mud bath that turns out to be anything but.
12	"Lemonade"	Brianna Chong	July 3, 2023	TBA	N/A
Tweety spots a giant lemon in a tree and is determined to make lemonade for everyone.
13	"Car Wash"	Brianna Chong	August 7, 2023	TBA	N/A
Lola oversees the car wash but soon realizes that she misassigned the tasks.
14	"Hide N' Seek"	Briana Chiong	November 12, 2023	TBA	N/A
The crew plays Hide N' Seek at headquarters and Tweety is the seeker.

=== Season 2 (2024–25) ===
No. overall	No. in season	Title	Directed by	Written by	Storyboarded by	Original release date	Prod. code	U.S. viewers (millions)
40	1	"The Easter Bunnies"	Alec Megibben	Katie Mattila	Samantha Sylvers & Carrie Hankins	March 25, 2024	201 (141)	N/A
The Looney Builders fill in for the Easter Bunny (who is sick) to do all the work until Easter morning.
41	2	"Junior"	Alec Megibben	Kevin Fleming & Rob Janas	Michelle Rincon Eloren	March 26, 2024	202 (142)	N/A
After his excitement that caused bedtime setbacks, Junior the Bear learns to be gentle with the Looney Builders.
42	3	"Looney Moon"	Kim Le	Laura Bowes	Chelsea Holt & Carrie Hankins	March 27, 2024	203 (143)	N/A
Tweety must face his fear of the dark as the Looney Moon arises at night.
43	4	"Glamp Out"	Lindsey Pollard	Drew Champion & Jacob Moffat	Alycia White	March 28, 2024	204 (144)	N/A
While on Gossamer's camping trip with our heroes, Daffy insists they go glamping instead of camping!
44	5	"Outer Space"	Alec Megibben	Laura Bowes	Samantha Sylvers	March 29, 2024	205 (145)	N/A
Marvin the Martian is ecstatic when the Looney Builders build him and his "half-bird, half-space" Martian crew a new space station. With the Martians overwhelming him for his very important research, Marvin needs space in outer space.
45	6	"The Great Flying Flea"	Alec Megibben	Corey Powell	Samantha Sylvers & Carrie Hankins	January 20, 2025	206 (146)	N/A
The Looney Builders build Zippy, the Great Flying Flea, a new circus in town, but he does not dare to leave Sylvester!
46	7	"The Snuffles"	Alec Megibben	Jo Claes	Shannon Hay & Carrie Hankins	January 21, 2025	207 (147)	N/A
Lola Bunny is sick due to her morning gardening allergies, so the crew must rely on themselves to build an outdoor movie theater after Mayor Foghorn Leghorn hired them.
47	8	"Rainy Day"	Kim Le	Cassie Soliday	Chelsea Holt & Carrie Hankins	January 22, 2025	208 (148)	N/A
It is raining in Looneyburg, and Porky hopes to show that our heroes can still have fun, even if it means building a fort.
48	9	"Bugs and the Beanstalk"	Kim Le	Kevin Fleming & Rob Janas	Brittany McCarthy & Carrie Hankins	January 23, 2025	209 (149)	N/A
The Looney Builders build a castle for Elmer the Giant. They admire his toys and use them without his permission!
49	10	"Jazz Hooves"	Kim Le	Kevin Fleming & Rob Janas	Chelsea Holt	January 24, 2025	210 (200)	N/A
Fosse Ferret hires The Looney Builders to build a stage for the kids’ dance recital. Eggbert has stage fright, but Porky is determined to help him overcome it.
50	11	"Looney Games"	Kim Le	Laura Bowes	Brittany McCarthy & Carrie Hankins	March 10, 2025	211 (201)	N/A
The Looney Games are at risk due to unexpected conflicts, so the Looney Builders need reinforcements from Looneyburg to fix the games and get the job done.
51	12	"Roller Disco"	Kim Le	Sarah Bellardini	Chelsea Holt & Carrie Hankins	March 11, 2025	212 (202)	N/A
Pete Puma hires The Looney Builders to build a roller disco for Looneyburg. Lola is new to roller skating but does not want to take it slow and practice.
52	13	"Grandpa Oink"	Alec Megibben	Laura Bowes	Michelle Rincon Eloren & Carrie Hankins	March 12, 2025	213 (203)	N/A
The Looney Builders are hired by Petunia’s grandfather, Grandpa Oink to upgrade his farm. They take things too far, and Grandpa Oink misses some of the things he loves most about farming.
53	14	"Hare Ball"	Kim Le	Joe Morgan	Brittany McCarthy	March 13, 2025	214 (204)	N/A
Marvin the Martian hires The Looney Builders to build an outer space ball court on Mars. Bugs is a big fan of the sport, and soon becomes a ball and build "hog."
54	15	"Squeaky Clean"	Lindsey Pollard	Jen Bardekoff	Katie Hood & Carrie Hankins	March 14, 2025	216 (206)	N/A
The Looney Builders build their headquarters a car wash. Daffy does not want to wash Dumpy and goes to extreme lengths to keep him dirty and preserve their memories.
55	16	"Prizeworthy Birdie"	Lindsey Pollard	Drew Champion & Jacob Moffat	Katie Hood & Carrie Hankins	April 14, 2025	217 (207)	N/A
Sunny Seagull hires The Looney Builders to build a carnival on Looneyburg's pier. The crew gets so caught up trying to win the games that they lose sight of what matters.
56	17	"Cake Bake"	Alec Megibben	Laura Bowes	Shannon Hay & Carrie Hankins	April 15, 2025	218 (208)	N/A
The Looney Builders take turns distracting Petunia as they build her a big surprise birthday cake in the back yard.
57	18	"Porky Perfect Parade"	Lindsey Pollard	Sam Bissonnette	Alycia White & Carrie Hankins	April 16, 2025	219 (209)	N/A
The Looney Builders build a float to lead the Flower Parade, but Porky will not settle for anything less than Porky Perfect.
58	19	"Coaster Contest"	Alec Megibben	Jen Bardekoff	Katie Hood & Carrie Hankins	April 17, 2025	220 (210)	N/A
The Looney Builders are hired to build a rollercoaster for Looneyburg. Bugs and Daffy soon get caught up trying to prove their part of the coaster is the best.
59	20	"Sam's Stylin' Salon"	Lindsey Pollard	Sarah Nerboso	Samantha Sylvers & Carrie Hankins	April 18, 2025	221 (211)	N/A
Sam Sheepdog hires The Looney Builders to build him a salon. Sam offers his custom cut only to learn that different folks want different styles.
60	21	"Polar Plunge"	Lindsey Pollard	Kevin Fleming & Rob Janas	Alycia White & Carrie Hankins	May 12, 2025	222 (212)	N/A
Pro snowboarder Pepper Polar Bear hires The Looney Builders to build a ski resort. Pepper soon learns that others have different skill levels.
61	22	"This Sand Is Your Sand"	Kim Le	Kevin Fleming & Rob Janas	Brittany McCarthy & Carrie Hankins	May 13, 2025	223 (213)	N/A
Wile E. Coyote hires The Looney Builders to build him a house in the desert so he can be alone. The Road Runner tries to pay him a visit, causing Wile E. to heighten his security measures.
62	23	"Fire Fighters"	Alec Megibben	Laura Bowes	Katie Hood	May 14, 2025	224 (214)	N/A
The Looney Builders are hired by the town's volunteer firefighters to build a fire truck. Duty calls, and they build on the go as they make rescues throughout Looneyburg.
63	24	"Beignet Day"	Alec Megibben	Jo Claes	Michelle Rincon Eloren & Carrie Hankins	May 15, 2025	225 (215)	N/A
Zaida Gator hires The Looney Builders to build her a boat so she can share her beignets in the swamp. She soon realizes there are others to share with elsewhere and enlists the crew to make it possible.
64	25	"Pauleen's Pins"	Lindsey Pollard	Jessie Gant	Alycia White & Carrie Hankins	May 16, 2025	226 (216)	N/A
Pauleen Penguin hires The Looney Builders to build an ice bowling alley in Looneyburg. Her homesickness causes setbacks until the crew helps her feel better.
65	26	"Coconut Hut"	Alec Megibben	Kevin Fleming & Rob Janas	Michelle Rincon Eloren & Carrie Hankins	September 1, 2025	227 (217)	N/A
While on vacation, The Looney Builders befriend Coco the Crab and offer to build her a mini-resort. They shrink down for a micro-build and must rely on the island's natural resources to get the job done.
66	27	"Balloon Voyage"	Alec Megibben	Laura Bowes	Michelle Rincon Eloren & Carrie Hankins	September 2, 2025	228 (218)	N/A
The Looney Builders are hired by Mac Gopher to build a hot air balloon for him and Tosh to ride in for a festival. Tosh keeps his fear of flying to himself and tries to weigh down the build to avoid liftoff.
67	28	"Yosemite Sam's Dude Ranch"	Lindsey Pollard	Kevin Fleming & Rob Janas	Alycia White & Carrie Hankins	September 3, 2025	229 (219)	N/A
The Looney Builders are hired by Yosemite Sam to build a dude ranch. Sam hurries the crew along, negatively impacting their work.
68	29	"Baseball Bunnies"	Alec Megibben	Jo Claes	Chelsea Holt; Carrie Hankins & Samantha Sylvers	September 4, 2025	230 (220)	N/A
The Looney Builders build a baseball field, but both Bugs and Lola want to be the pitcher for the big game later. They attempt to prove themselves as they work, causing setbacks with the build.
69	30	"Spellbound"	Kim Le	Kevin Fleming & Rob Janas	Brittany McCarthy & Carrie Hankins	October 6, 2025	231 (221)	N/A
It is Halloween and the Looney crew try to make Witch Hazel's house scarier; they use magical things and become enchanted themselves.
70	31	"Miss Prissy's Market"	Lindsey Pollard	Laura Bowes	Alycia White; Samantha Sylvers & Carrie Hankins	October 6, 2025	232 (222)	N/A
Miss Prissy hires The Looney Builders to build a grocery store for Looneyburg. When she stocks the store in unexpected ways, the crew must help her properly organize it.
71	32	"Super Builders"	Lindsey Pollard	Joe Morgan	Samantha Sylvers & Carrie Hankins	October 7, 2025	233 (223)	N/A
The Looney Builders play superheroes and decide to upgrade their vehicles and headquarters. However, when one of Wile E. Coyote's inventions goes rogue, the crew must work together to save the day!
72	33	"Dodo's Wacky Funhouse"	Alec Megibben	Cassie Soliday	Katie Hood & Carrie Hankins	October 8, 2025	234 (224)	N/A
Yoyo Dodo hires The Looney Builders to build a funhouse for Looneyburg. The crew thinks he is goofing around as they work, but soon discover they have misunderstood what Yoyo really wants.
73	34	"Robo-Runner"	Lindsey Pollard	Laura Bowes	Katie Hood & Carrie Hankins	October 9, 2025	235 (225)	N/A
The Looney Builders are hired to build a festive course for the fall foot race. Wile E. Coyote is determined to beat the Road Runner with his robo-runner despite its malfunctions.
74	35	"Cuckoo Cuckoo"	Kim Le	Kevin Fleming & Rob Janas	Rafael Rosado & Carrie Hankins	November 17, 2025	236 (226)	N/A
Curt Cuckoo hires The Looney Builders to build a giant cuckoo clock in Germany to signal the start of Martinstag. The crew struggles to get it right until they ask Curt for his help.
75	36	"Surf's Up"	Lindsey Pollard	Corey Powell	Samantha Sylvers & Carrie Hankins	November 17, 2025	237 (227)	N/A
The Looney Builders are hired to build a surfside hangout in Australia for a surfing competition. Bugs and Daffy want to compete but are a little out of their league until Taz offers to teach them.
76	37	"Mamma Mia Pizzeria"	Kim Le	Jen Bardekoff	Rafael Rosado & Carrie Hankins	November 18, 2025	238 (228)	N/A
The Looney Builders are hired by Giovanna Badgerini to update her family's pizzeria in Italy. However, Giovanna's mother prefers the old way of doing things, which causes setbacks with the build until the crew helps them compromise.
77	38	"Carnaval"	Kim Le	Laura Bowes	Brittany McCarthy	November 19, 2025	239 (229)	N/A
Carina Capybara hires The Looney Builders to build her Samba School a float for Brazil's Carnaval parade. She soon realizes the float will be even better if they incorporate her students' ideas.
78	39	"Puppet Showstopper"	Kim Le	Jimy Shah	Rafael Rosado; Brittany McCarthy & Samantha Sylvers	November 20, 2025	240 (230)	N/A
The Looney Builders are hired by Parth Peacock to build a puppet stage and puppets in India. They soon learn that Parth's form of puppetry differs from their own and must correct everything in time for his big show.
79	40	"Santa's Toyshop"	Lindsey Pollard	Kevin Fleming & Rob Janas	Alycia White	December 8, 2025	215 (205)	N/A
After a hot cocoa disaster, Santa Claus hires The Looney Builders to build him a new toyshop in time to save Christmas.

== International broadcast ==
The series premiered on Cartoonito in Latin America on December 1, 2022.

The series premiered on Boomerang in Portugal on November 20, 2022, as part of its Cartoonito block (then airing as part of the entire 24-hour Cartoonito channel that replaced the former).

The series premiered on Cartoonito in the UK and Ireland on November 4, 2022.

The series started airing on Cartoonito in Central and Eastern Europe on April 24, 2023.

== Reception ==
The show gained positive reception from critics. Tierra Carpenter of WISH-TV says, "Tapping into parents' nostalgia, Bugs Bunny Builders is THE show parents have been waiting for to introduce their favorite Looney Tunes characters to their kids. The show is designed to be funny on two levels, allowing kids to laugh along with these characters while also enticing parents to stay in the room and watch together."
