= Bugs Bunny's Thanksgiving Diet =

1979 television special

- Written by: Jack Enyart; Hal Geer
- Directed by: David Detiege
- Voices of: Mel Blanc; June Foray
- Country of origin: United States
- Original language: English

Production
- Executive producer: Hal Geer
- Editor: Jim Champin
- Running time: 30 min
- Production company: Warner Bros. Television

Original release
- Network: CBS
- Release: November 15, 1979

Bugs Bunny's Thanksgiving Diet is an animated television special that aired November 15, 1979 on CBS. It stars Bugs Bunny and incorporated parts of several Looney Tunes cartoons. The special followed up on the successful Looney Tunes special Bugs and Daffy's Carnival of the Animals that had aired in 1976, which reintroduced the character of Bugs Bunny in his first new material since 1964.

In the special, Bugs is a doctor, prescribing cartoons for the viewers to watch. The special includes two complete cartoons, Bedevilled Rabbit and Rabbit Every Monday, and clips from eight others.

== Cast ==
- Mel Blanc as Bugs Bunny, Porky Pig, Wile E. Coyote, Yosemite Sam, Sylvester and Tasmanian Devil
- June Foray as Millicent (from 1957's Rabbit Romeo) and Yellow Female Rabbit

== Credits ==
Directed by David Detiege, Friz Freleng, Chuck Jones and Robert McKimson. Produced by Hal Geer.

== Cartoons featured ==
- Rabbit Every Monday
- Stop! Look! And Hasten!
- Guided Muscle
- Zip Zip Hooray!
- Beep, Beep
- Tweet Dreams
- Birds Anonymous
- Freudy Cat
- Canned Feud
- Trip for Tat
- Bedevilled Rabbit

== Home Video ==
The special was released as part of the Looney Tunes Holiday Triple Feature DVD set along with Daffy Duck's Thanks-for-giving Special, Bugs Bunny's Howl-oween Special, and Bah, Humduck! A Looney Tunes Christmas.
