= Easter Yeggs =

1947 film by Robert McKimson

- Lobby card
- Directed by: Robert McKimson
- Story by: Warren Foster
- Starring: Mel Blanc; Arthur Q. Bryan
- Music by: Carl Stalling
- Animation by: Charles McKimson<br />Richard Bickenbach<br />I. Ellis; Fred Abranz (unc.); Anatole Kirsanoff (unc.)
- Layouts by: Cornett Wood
- Backgrounds by: Richard H. Thomas
- Color process: Technicolor
- Production company: Warner Bros. Cartoons
- Distributed by: Warner Bros. Pictures
- Release date: June 28, 1947
- Running time: 7:16
- Country: United States
- Language: English

Easter Yeggs is a 1947 Looney Tunes theatrical animated short. The cartoon was released on June 28, 1947, and features Bugs Bunny and Elmer Fudd. The title is a play on "Easter eggs" and on "yegg", a slang term for a burglar or safecracker. The voice and characterization of the Easter Bunny in the short is a reference to a character that Mel Blanc performed on the Burns and Allen radio show, the morose Happy Postman, even including the character's catch phrase, "Remember, keep smiling."

== Plot ==
While reading How to Multiply, Bugs overhears moaning that turns out to be a depressed Easter Bunny, who tricks Bugs into filling in for him (a trick the Easter Bunny plays on unsuspecting rabbits every year). Initially, Bugs accepts the job with pleasure, which quickly evaporates when his encounter with a Dead End Kid (and his gun-toting caretakers), who delights in demolishing Easter eggs, sours him on the task. The Easter Bunny sends a now-angry Bugs toward Elmer Fudd, who has set a trap hoping to cook the Easter Bunny for "Easter rabbit stew." Thus commences the classic chase and gags until Bugs is finally able to stop Elmer by painting Elmer's head like an Easter egg and unleashing the Dead End Kid on him.

A disappointed Easter Bunny picks up a large egg Bugs dropped, which is actually a bomb. Bugs lights the fuse and the bomb explodes, propelling the Easter Bunny into a tree. Bugs looks up and, with triumphant schadenfreude, reminds the Easter Bunny of his own instruction: "Remember, keep smiling!"`

== Reception ==
Comic book and animation writer Earl Kress writes, "Daffy Doodles, Robert McKimson's directorial debut, and Easter Yeggs are the director's very best... There are plenty of gags and nice pacing here that make this cartoon one of my favorites."

== Home media ==
Easter Yeggs is available on the Looney Tunes Golden Collection: Volume 3 DVD box set and on Looney Tunes Platinum Collection: Volume 3 Blu-ray set.

== See also ==
- Bugs Bunny filmography
- Elmer Fudd filmography
- Looney Tunes and Merrie Melodies filmography (1940–1949)
- List of Easter films
- Bugs Bunny's Easter Special

Preceded by A Hare Grows In Manhattan	Bugs Bunny Cartoons; 1947	Succeeded by Slick Hare
