= Tugboat Granny =

- Directed by: Friz Freleng
- Story by: Warren Foster
- Starring: Mel Blanc; June Foray
- Edited by: Treg Brown
- Music by: Milt Franklyn
- Animation by: Gerry Chiniquy; Virgil Ross; Arthur Davis
- Layouts by: Hawley Pratt
- Backgrounds by: Irv Wyner
- Color process: Technicolor
- Production company: Warner Bros. Cartoons
- Distributed by: Warner Bros. Pictures
- Release date: June 23, 1956
- Running time: 7 minutes
- Language: English

Tugboat Granny is a 1956 Warner Bros. Merrie Melodies cartoon animated short directed by Friz Freleng. The short was released on June 23, 1956, and stars Tweety and Sylvester.

The voices were performed by Mel Blanc and June Foray.

The cartoon's title is a play on Tugboat Annie, and is the only Warner Bros. cartoon to bear Granny's name.

It joined Guided Muscle and The Grey Hounded Hare as the cartoons featured on the final episode of ABC's The Bugs Bunny & Tweety Show on September 2, 2000.

== Plot ==
In the opening scene, Granny and Tweety are happily piloting a tugboat in a harbor, singing a kiddie-song duet about the carefree joys of their activity. It is the only scene in which Granny appears, as the rest of the cartoon is devoted to Sylvester's latest attempts to catch and eat Tweety, which begins when, after failing to grab a fish by hiding in a fisherman's basket (the fisherman caught a crab instead, which Sylvester gets attacked by), he sees the boat carrying the canary chug past.

Sylvester's attempts, all unsuccessful, include the following:

- Using a wooden rowboat to get to the tug. Tweety drops anchor in the boat's hull, sinking Sylvester (though he comes out onto the beach without the boat but still rowing with the oars).
- Using an inflatable raft, which is deflated by a dart thrown by Tweety ("Hey, puddy tat! Wook what I found! Here, you can have it!"), sinking Sylvester once again.
- Attempting to jump off a bridge, which is mistimed, as Sylvester lands inside the smokestack, leaving him frantically trying to put out his now-on fire backside.
- A follow-up attempt from another bridge to parachute onto the boat's deck ("Oh, that bad ol' puddy tat! He never give up!") results in a jammed pack, which only opens after Sylvester sinks to the bottom of the river ("Aww, the poor puddy tat. Got himself all soaking wet."). He subsequently uses a pipe as a snorkel to walk on the sea floor to the boat. Unfortunately, a seagull finds Sylvester's pipe the perfect resting place, blocking the airway making Sylvester unable to breathe and turning him blue; gasping for air the cat rushes back to shore, he starts panting and finds the seagull laid an egg in his mouth. The frightened seagull flees as Sylvester angrily throws the egg at it; the gull catches it and hits Sylvester in the face with it.
- Driving a motorboat, but Sylvester instead goes into the rapids and over a waterfall. All the time, the motor fails to start (its sputtering provided by Blanc doing his "Jack Benny's Maxwell" routine) and when it does, Sylvester pounds it to submission.
- A lasso ("That puddy tat think he a cowboy!"), which instead grabs the antenna of a speedboat. Sylvester decides to show off several waterskiing tricks ... until the inattentive puddy smashes into a pole. As he floats upside-down, a fish gurgles Tweety's signature line: "I tawt I taw a puddy tat." The cartoon ends just after Sylvester fails to grab the fish.

== Home media ==
The film is available on the Looney Tunes Collector's Choice: Volume 3 Blu-ray.

Preceded by Tree Cornered Tweety	Sylvester and Tweety cartoons 1956	Succeeded by Tweet Zoo
