= A Hare Grows in Manhattan =

1947 Warner Bros. cartoon film by Friz Freleng

- Directed by: I. Freleng
- Story by: Michael Maltese; Tedd Pierce
- Starring: Mel Blanc
- Music by: Carl Stalling
- Animation by: Virgil Ross; Gerry Chiniquy; Manuel Perez; Ken Champin
- Layouts by: Hawley Pratt
- Backgrounds by: Philip DeGuard
- Color process: Technicolor
- Production company: Warner Bros. Cartoons
- Distributed by: Warner Bros. Pictures; The Vitaphone Corporation
- Release date: March 22, 1947
- Running time: 8:20
- Country: United States
- Language: English

A Hare Grows In Manhattan is a Warner Bros. cartoon in the Merrie Melodies series, released on March 22, 1947. Directed by I. Freleng, the short features Bugs Bunny.

== Plot ==
Hollywood gossip columnist Lola Beverly engages Bugs Bunny in a fictionalized biographical account. Bugs narrates his purported upbringing on the Lower East Side of Manhattan, illustrated through tap-dancing sequences and renditions of period songs.

Central is Bugs' recurrent encounters with a street gang of stray dogs, led by a dim-witted bulldog resembling Hector. The narrative unfolds amidst recognizable New York City landmarks, including the Automat and a stylized rendition of the Stork Club. As Bugs navigates the urban landscape, he employs humorous tactics to evade the pursuing canines.

Bugs thinks he has dispatched the dogs, saying "That's thirty for today!" He goes back to his tap-dancing and singing, and suddenly finds himself in a blind alley next to a newsstand. The gang of dogs reappears and marches in on Bugs menacingly. Enraged, Bugs grabs a book and threatens to hit them with it in his "last stand". The dogs' eyes open wide when they see the book, and they turn around and race to, and across, the Brooklyn Bridge. The puzzled Bugs looks at the book and sees that it is the novel A Tree Grows in Brooklyn.

Bugs says to himself, in a rare quiet and reflective moment, "Ya know, maybe I oughta read dis t'ing!" As the underscore reprises an instrumental bar of "Rosie O'Grady", Bugs walks away toward the city's skyscrapers, while reading the book and humming along.

== Voice cast and additional crew ==
- Mel Blanc voices Bugs Bunny, Spike
- Frances Baruch voices Lola Beverly
- Tedd Pierce voices Tough Gray Dog
- Other Tough Dogs voiced by Michael Maltese
- Film Edited by Treg Brown
- Uncredited Orchestration by Milt Franklyn

== Production notes ==
The short was originally based on a short autobiographical piece of the same name that was published in the December issue of Coronet magazine in 1945. In the autobiography, Bugs recounts his rise and only briefly mentions his days on the streets of Manhattan which he describes as "simple and carefree". He would spend his days throwing rocks at his pals, stealing carrots from local pushcarts, and dealing with thugs using his "rabbit punch" technique.

The story continues in which Bugs reveals that his name was given to him by his family for his funny antics. In time he would land a job at a place called the Palace where he would serve as the rabbit in the hat of the magician the Great Presto. Eventually he would leave for Hollywood, much to the sadness of his parents, to become a star. Which he boasted that he "arrived just in time to save the movies from the hams who was overrunning it".

== Analysis ==
Andrea Most notes that this short has Bugs Bunny trying to escape his pursuers through constantly changing "costumes, voices, accents, and characters". She also points that throughout the Looney Tunes series, characters would change their "shape, size, character, gender, costume, and performance style" to either outwit or seduce others. She theorizes that the artists of Warner Bros. Cartoons, "mostly Jewish" in origin, were using a trope of transformation and escape which had deeper origins. She finds that many 20th-century comedies with Jewish creators share the theme of escaping through reinventing one's self.

This theme can be found in vaudeville comedy, where the comedians changed roles/identities with simple disguises. It can be found in Whoopee! (1928) and its film adaptation (1930), where Eddie Cantor's Jewish character transforms to "a Greek cook, a black errand boy, and an Indian chief". It can be found in the talent of Fanny Brice for "imitations". It can be found in Girl Crazy (1930), where Willie Howard transforms himself "to a woman, to a variety of famous performers..., to a western sheriff, to an Indian chief." One example is the film To Be or Not to Be (1942) where a mixed company of actors uses their skills in adopting roles to survive in Occupied Poland.

== Home media ==
- VHS - Starring Bugs Bunny
- VHS - Bugs Bunny: Hollywood Legend
- VHS - The Golden Age Of Looney Tunes Volume 7: Bugs Bunny by Each Director
- Laserdisc - Bugs Bunny Classics: Special Collectors Edition
- Laserdisc - The Golden Age Of Looney Tunes: Volume 1
- DVD - Looney Tunes Golden Collection: Volume 3
- Blu-ray/DVD - Looney Tunes Platinum Collection: Volume 3

== Sources ==
- Most, Andrea (2013), "The Birth of Theatrical Liberalism", Theatrical Liberalism: Jews and Popular Entertainment in America, New York University Press, ISBN 978-0-8147-5934-9

== See also ==
- Bugs Bunny filmography
- Looney Tunes and Merrie Melodies filmography (1940–1949)

Preceded by Rabbit Transit	Bugs Bunny Cartoons; 1947	Succeeded by Easter Yeggs
