= Egghead Jr. =

Warner Bros. theatrical cartoon character

- Looney Tunes/Merrie Melodies character
- First appearance: Little Boy Boo
- Created by: Robert McKimson
- Voiced by: Luke Lowe (Bugs Bunny Builders)

In-universe information
- Species: Chicken
- Gender: Male
- Relatives: Miss Prissy (mother)
- Nationality: American

Egghead Jr. is a fictional cartoon character in the Warner Bros. Looney Tunes and Merrie Melodies series of cartoons, created by Robert McKimson in the 1950s. He debuted in 1954's Little Boy Boo, and made two subsequent classic-era appearances, in 1955's Feather Dusted and 1960's Crockett-Doodle-Do.

== History ==
Egghead Jr. is a large-headed and very intelligent baby chick and appeared in several shorts with bumptious Foghorn Leghorn (also a character directed by McKimson and voiced by Mel Blanc). The only child of Miss Prissy, a widow hen, Egghead Jr. was bookish and never talked (though he mumbled when he counted playing hide-and-seek with Foghorn in Little Boy Boo). Egghead Jr. has the strange ability to accomplish virtually anything, simply by writing out physics theorems, then performing the action proposed thereby. Foghorn would try to teach him to play games like baseball and cowboys and Indians, with the intent that he act more like a typical boy, but invariably resulting in bodily injury for Foghorn.

It was previously noted that Egghead Jr. was also in the 1959 cartoon A Broken Leghorn, but this was the character Junior Rooster.

Egghead Jr. had no relation to Egghead, a human character that appeared in the Looney Tunes and Merrie Melodies shorts of the 1930s.

== Later appearances ==
In 1991, Egghead Jr. appeared in the Tiny Toon Adventures episode "Hog-Wild Hamton." He's Hamton J. Pig's neighbor and he doesn't like being disturbed. So when a wild party hosted by Plucky Duck takes place at Hamton's house while his parents are away and the guests refuse to keep the noise down, Egghead takes matters into his own hands by launching a missile that destroyed his house. Egghead Jr. later hands Ed McMayhem a note telling him that he is studying for a very important exam and requests that he stop his laughing. Ed continues to laugh and Egghead Jr. pokes him in the left knee cap causing him pain in the knee.

Egghead Jr. also makes a cameo in the Pinky and the Brain episode "Star Warners."

He makes a cameo in the film Space Jam watching Michael Jordan.

Egghead Jr. appears in the direct-to-video film Tweety's High-Flying Adventure as part of the team of birds following Tweety's journey around the world.

Egghead Jr. appears in the Duck Dodgers episode "Corporate Pigfall."

Egghead Jr. appears in Bah, Humduck! A Looney Tunes Christmas. He appears as a caroler alongside Henery Hawk, Barnyard Dawg Jr., and Porky Pig's daughter Priscilla.

Egghead Jr., now renamed "Eggbert", makes frequent appearances in the Looney Tunes series published by DC.

Egghead Jr. appears in Bugs Bunny Builders. Unlike most of his appearances, Egghead Jr. actually speaks. He is voiced by child actor Luke Lowe.
