= Bugs Bunny's Looney Christmas Tales =

1979 American television special

- Written by: Friz Freleng; Chuck Jones; Tony Benedict; John Dunn
- Directed by: Friz Freleng; Chuck Jones
- Voices of: Mel Blanc; June Foray
- Music by: Doug Goodwin
- Country of origin: United States
- Original language: English

Production
- Producers: Hal Geer; Friz Freleng
- Cinematography: Jed Spigarn
- Editors: Richard S. Gannon; Robert T. Gillis
- Running time: 30 minutes
- Production companies: DePatie–Freleng Enterprises; Chuck Jones Enterprises; Warner Bros. Television

Original release
- Network: CBS
- Release: November 27, 1979

Bugs Bunny's Looney Christmas Tales is a 1979 animated Christmas television special featuring Bugs Bunny and other Looney Tunes characters in three newly created cartoon shorts with seasonal themes. It premiered on CBS on November 27, 1979.

== Voice cast ==
- Mel Blanc as Bugs Bunny, Porky Pig, Foghorn Leghorn, Tweety Bird, Yosemite Sam, Wile E. Coyote and Road Runner, Tasmanian Devil, Speedy Gonzales, Santa Claus, and Airplane Pilots
- June Foray as Mrs. Claus and Clyde Bunny

== New cartoons featured ==
Three new cartoons appeared in the show:

- Bugs Bunny's Christmas Carol (Friz Freleng)
- Freeze Frame (Chuck Jones)
- The Fright Before Christmas (Friz Freleng)

== Home media ==
- Looney Tunes Golden Collection: Volume 5
- Bugs Bunny's Bustin' Out All Over
- Bugs and Daffy's Carnival of the Animals

== See also ==
- Bah, Humduck! A Looney Tunes Christmas
- List of Christmas films
