= Bunny Hugged =

1951 film by Chuck Jones

- Title card
- Directed by: Charles M. Jones
- Story by: Michael Maltese
- Starring: Mel Blanc
- Music by: Carl Stalling
- Animation by: Phil Monroe; Ken Harris; Lloyd Vaughan; Ben Washam
- Layouts by: Peter Alvarado
- Backgrounds by: Philip De Guard
- Color process: Technicolor
- Production company: Warner Bros. Cartoons
- Distributed by: Warner Bros. Pictures
- Release date: March 10, 1951
- Running time: 7:17
- Language: English

Bunny Hugged is a 1951 Warner Bros. Merrie Melodies short, directed by Chuck Jones and written by Michael Maltese. The short was released on March 10, 1951, and stars Bugs Bunny. Bunny Hugged is essentially a re-working of Jones' 1948 short Rabbit Punch, substituting wrestling for boxing.

== Plot ==
A wrestling match pits professional wrestler Ravishing Ronald, "the de-natured boy" (a parody of Gorgeous George and "Nature Boy" Buddy Rogers) against current champion the Crusher. Bugs, the mascot of Ravishing Ronald ("It's a livin'"), watches from a corner as the Crusher uses Ronald, tied up in his own hairnet, as a punching bag. Worried that he will lose his meal ticket, Bugs decides to enter the match as "The Masked Terror", wearing a covering over his entire head. The Crusher sees the new opponent as "fresh meat," disposes of Ronald and goes after Bugs.

Bugs using a little "stra-geetee" to gain the upper hand on the Crusher.

Bugs tries to wrestle Crusher, but Crusher is unfazed, toys with Bugs and, by turning Bugs' ears into a propeller, sends the rabbit flying into the crowd. When, on his return flight, Bugs is caught in Crusher's leg-scissors hold, he figures it's time to "employ a little stragety [sic]". Bugs rips his mask apart, causing Crusher to believe his trunks have torn. As the hulking wrestler squirms, embarrassed, in the ring, Bugs strolls back from off-screen wearing a sandwich board advertising his services as "Stychen Tyme," a tailor. Crusher tells him his problem and Bugs seemingly prepares to sew the trunks. Instead, he jabs a needle in Crusher's backside, resulting in him soaring, screaming, into the audience.

Enraged, the wrestler comes charging back, but Bugs opens the door of a safe; Crusher runs through, bounces back off the ring ropes into the now slammed shut door. A now disoriented Crusher is able to be pinned, literally. As Bugs is being declared the new champion, Crusher snaps out of it. He offers his hand in congratulations and, despite the crowd's objections (Crusher merely growls them into silence), Bugs relents. Crusher yanks on the 'arm' and bites down on it, discovering it is a stick of dynamite, which blows up in his face.

== Reception ==
Animation producer Paul Dini writes, "Many good cartoons feature realistic human animation. But a great cartoon features humans so wildly caricatured that every motion strikes us as real. Bunny Hugged is one such cartoon."

Preceded by Rabbit Every Monday	Bugs Bunny Cartoons; 1951	Succeeded by The Fair-Haired Hare
