= Tree Cornered Tweety =

- Lobby card
- Directed by: Friz Freleng
- Story by: Warren Foster
- Starring: Mel Blanc
- Music by: Milt Franklyn
- Animation by: Gerry Chiniquy; Virgil Ross; Arthur Davis
- Layouts by: Hawley Pratt
- Backgrounds by: Irv Wyner
- Color process: Technicolor
- Production company: Warner Bros. Cartoons
- Distributed by: Warner Bros. Pictures
- Release date: May 19, 1956
- Running time: 7 minutes
- Country: United States
- Language: English

Tree Cornered Tweety is a Warner Bros. Merrie Melodies cartoon directed by Friz Freleng, released on May 19, 1956, starring Tweety and Sylvester. The title is a play on "three-cornered hat". There may also be a reference to "Three Cornered Tune" from Guys and Dolls. Voiceovers were done by Mel Blanc.

The cartoon is a parody of Dragnet, with Tweety narrating the short in the style of Joe Friday, and is one of the Tweety and Sylvester shorts wherein Tweety does not directly influence the outcome. The cartoon is a "clip show" containing excerpts from other cartoons.

== Plot ==
"This is da city. Twee miwwion people. Twee hundwed thousand puddy tats. Dat's where I come in. I'm a wittle bird. I live in a cage. My name...Tweety."

— Tweety, Opening

Tweety narrates his daily activities as he is spotted, then chased by Sylvester. Utilizing a Jack Webb impression, Tweety delivers his signature "I tawt I taw a puddy tat" line (adding the line "I checked" in the middle of it), then describes his adversary in detail: "A bwack puddy tat, wed nose, white chest. Name...'Tilvester."

Tweety describes Sylvester's attempts, as follows:

- The opening scene, where Sylvester simply crosses the street and walks up the stairs to the room Tweety is located in. An unseen woman roars "Scat, you scoundrel! You alley cat! You hooligan! You troublemaker!" and throws plates at him. Sylvester scurries down the stairs and out of the building.
- Subsequently, Sylvester builds a makeshift bridge of wooden planks to get to the building across the way where Tweety is housed. The bridge collapses as the nails come loose at the base, due to the cat's weight and its poor construction.
- Syvlester then uses a swing to get to Tweety's apartment, but smashes into a telephone pole.
- Sylvester's fourth attempt involves the use of a pilot's ejector seat to get at the high story window where Tweety is, but it hurls him straight through overhead wires, splitting the cat into several lengthwise pieces.
- Tweety feeds with the pigeons at the city library. Sylvester stops by and chases his prey into an automat. Tweety takes refuge behind a window (conveniently labeled "Tweety Pie," right next to the lemon pie). Sylvester inserts a nickel into the slot, opens the door, and gets a spring-loaded pie thrown into his face.
- Following a mountain blizzard, Tweety puts spoons on his feet (as snowshoes) to search for food. Sylvester comes after him on skis, and it appears the speedy cat will catch his dinner...until he crashes into a tree.
- Tweety hides in a treetop in a mine field. Sylvester uses a metal detector to try to avoid the mines, but Tweety throws a magnet at the cat, which draws all the mines at him and results in an explosion.
- A chase on a high wooden bridge in Colorado, where Tweety hides beneath the deck, out of the cat's reach. A determined Sylvester saws a hole in the center of the bridge, but does not realize he is standing in the middle of the portion he is sawing off until well after he has begun his plummet to the river below. Unseen by his predator, Tweety steps out of his way. A British-accented man in a fishing boat spots the falling projectile headed straight for him and takes note of the situation, using Tweety's catchphrase: "I tawt I taw a puddy tat!" Sylvester plunges straight through the boat's hull, causing the cat, the man and his boat to sink ("I did! I did! I did..." the man states, bubbling the last line "...taw a puddy tat!" as he sinks below the surface to end the cartoon).

== Home media ==
This short was released on disc 1 of the Looney Tunes Collector's Vault: Volume 3 Blu-ray set.

Preceded by Tweet and Sour	Sylvester and Tweety cartoons 1956	Succeeded by Tugboat Granny
