= Witch Hazel (Looney Tunes) =

Warner Bros. theatrical cartoon character

- Looney Tunes character
- First appearance: Bewitched Bunny (July 24, 1954)
- Created by: Chuck Jones
- Voiced by: Bea Benaderet (1954); June Foray (1956–2005); Tress MacNeille (1992–1994); Roz Ryan (2011–2013); Lauri Fraser (2014); Candi Milo (2017–present); Eric Bauza (2018)

In-universe information
- Alias: Witch Lezah
- Species: Human
- Occupation: Witch

Witch Hazel is an animated cartoon character in the Warner Bros. Looney Tunes and Merrie Melodies series of cartoons and TV shows. Witch Hazel is a fairy tale witch antagonist with green skin, a round figure, exaggerated bulbous facial features, and a single tooth. The name is a pun on the witch-hazel plant and folk remedies based on it.

Created by Chuck Jones during the golden age of American animation, the character was originally voiced by Bea Benaderet in 1954's Bewitched Bunny. Benaderet would later be replaced by June Foray, who voiced the character almost exclusively beginning with 1956's Broom-Stick Bunny and concluding with a 2005 episode of Duck Dodgers. Tress MacNeille would briefly voice Witch Hazel from 1992 to 1994 for episodes of Tiny Toon Adventures and Animaniacs. After Foray's departure from the role, the character was voiced by Roz Ryan from 2011 to 2013 for The Looney Tunes Show (as Witch Lezah) and by Candi Milo from 2017 onward.

== Concept and creation ==
Different characters of the same name appeared in several studios' short films throughout the golden age of American animation: the first was in the Disney cartoon Trick or Treat (1952), voiced by June Foray. Inspired by this character, Chuck Jones created his own witch for Warner Bros., reusing the same pun. Jones could do this because the name was already in use in commercial products; Foray said that the characters were also not expected to have any longevity. In her initial appearance, Bewitched Bunny (1954), she is voiced by Bea Benaderet. Starting with Broom-Stick Bunny (1956), Foray took over voicing the character. To differentiate the characters, Foray said that she performed the Disney version with a British accent, but the Warner Bros. version was "all American".

Despite their common name, Jones' Witch Hazel is a much different witch from her Disney counterpart. The Looney Tunes character is a highly stylized villainess. Her rotund, green-skinned body is wrapped in a plain, blue dress and supported by twig-like legs. She has wild black hair from which hairpins fly and spin in midair whenever she zooms off on her broom or cackles in glee over her next evil scheme and she wears a crumpled black hat. Her nose and chin jut bulbously from her face and her mouth sports a single tooth. She has two pets: a tarantula named Paul, and a black cat. She also has two magic brooms: one for sweeping the floor and one for flying.

In Chuck Jones' cartoons, Witch Hazel was depicted as sweet, lovable grandmother. She was always smiling and laughing, and she loved doing stereotypical things a grandmother would, such as baking cookies and serving lots of ice cream to children even as she prepared to eat them alive, as in Bewitched Bunny when she brought Hansel and Gretel into her home.

== Appearances ==
=== Golden age ===
Transformed into a female rabbit, Witch Hazel gets Bugs Bunny's attention in Bewitched Bunny (1954)

Bewitched Bunny retells the fairy tale about Hansel and Gretel. Witch Hazel plays the witch who attempts to cook and eat the titular children. Bugs Bunny witnesses her coax the children inside and saves them from Witch Hazel's clutches because the Masked Avenger is not around. Once the witch realizes that Bugs is a rabbit, she chases him to put him into her witch's brew. Upon putting Bugs into a sleeping spell, he is awoken by a kiss from Prince Charming; Bugs then tells him that he is in the wrong story. Bugs eventually uses Hazel's own magic against her and transforms her into a female rabbit, to whom he is instantly attracted. He then walks away with her while he breaks the fourth wall and comments, "Ah sure, I know. But aren't they all witches inside?"

In Broom-Stick Bunny, Witch Hazel takes great pride in her status as the ugliest witch. While trick-or-treating on Halloween as a witch, Bugs Bunny visits Witch Hazel's house and she mistakes him for an actual witch. So does her magic mirror, which warns, "You're an ugly one, 'tis true; but that creep is uglier far than you!" Jealous that this newcomer is uglier than herself, Hazel attempts to trick the "witch" into drinking a "Pretty Potion" disguised as tea. Bugs removes his mask to drink it and she becomes obsessed with using the rabbit in her witch's brew. Hazel captures him by tricking him with a carrot. Hazel is about to kill Bugs, but becomes distraught when his sad eyes remind her of Paul, her pet tarantula. Bugs calms her down with a beverage which turns out to be the Pretty Potion. Transformed into a beautiful young woman, Hazel asks her magic mirror if she is still ugly. The genie in her mirror instantly falls in love with her and Hazel flies off into the night on her flying broomstick and the genie chases after her on his magic carpet. Bugs calls Air Raid headquarters to alert them about a "Flying sorceress chased by a genie with light brown hair."

Bugs Bunny was pitted against Witch Hazel for the last time in A Witch's Tangled Hare (1959), a parody of Macbeth. This short was directed by Abe Levitow. Rabbit is once again the missing ingredient to Witch Hazel's brew and Bugs happens to be in the area. Meanwhile, a William Shakespeare look-alike observes the action in search of inspiration. Bugs finds out that the man is not William Shakespeare, but is actually a man named Sam Crubish. Witch Hazel hears this and it appears that the two know each other but have not seen each other in a while because Crubish had the wrong apartment number, "2B". The poet and Witch Hazel leave talking about who made the mistake. Bugs Bunny quotes the famous line from Hamlet – "To be, or not to be, that is the question."

The Bugs Bunny short Transylvania 6-5000 (1963) features a brief, silent cameo appearance from Witch Hazel (or a character very similar to her) as Bugs briefly transforms Count Bloodcount, the cartoon's vampire antagonist, into her through the use of a magic spell.

Once production shifted to DePatie–Freleng Enterprises, Witch Hazel appeared in the cartoon A-Haunting We Will Go (1966), which also starred Daffy Duck and Speedy Gonzales.

=== After the Golden Age ===
All four of Witch Hazel's original Looney Tunes short cartoons were edited and repurposed into the 1977 television special Bugs Bunny's Howl-oween Special. June Foray recorded new and redubbed dialogue for Witch Hazel in the special, including in newly animated content to link the classic clips together into one narrative.

Witch Hazel made a cameo in the deleted "Pig Head" scene of the film Who Framed Roger Rabbit (1988). She is seen flying around on Beelzebub before getting struck by lightning.

Witch Hazel has appeared in cameos in various Warner Bros. productions, such as the movie Space Jam (1996) and its stand-alone sequel Space Jam: A New Legacy (2021), the video games The Bugs Bunny Crazy Castle 2 (in which she is the primary antagonist), Bugs Bunny: Lost in Time (in which she appears as a boss and also appears on the cover of the game) and Looney Tunes Collector: Alert! (2000), one episode each of Animaniacs (in a Rita and Runt episode), The Sylvester and Tweety Mysteries, Pinky and the Brain, Tiny Toon Adventures and Duck Dodgers (which references Broom-Stick Bunny and where June Foray returns to do her voice). She was also featured as the lead antagonist in DC Comics' three-issue Bugs Bunny miniseries from 1990 (though at the ending of the storyline, her appearance there is actually revealed to be a disguised Wile E. Coyote). She was used as an enemy in Scott Lowenstein's Bugs Bunny Crazy Castle 4 and her silhouette can be seen on the cover of the game. Witch Hazel has a cameo in the video game adaptation of Looney Tunes: Back in Action as a painting parodying the Mona Lisa in the Louvre Museum. Witch Hazel is also spotted in a MetLife commercial in 2012.

Witch Hazel also makes a non-speaking cameo appearance in the film Looney Tunes: Rabbits Run.

Witch Hazel also starred in the New Looney Tunes segments "Finders Keepers, Losers Sweepers", "Hiccups and Downs" and "It's Snout or Never".

Witch Hazel made her first appearance in the Looney Tunes Cartoons short "Hex Appeal", which is part of a Halloween special titled Bugs Bunny's Howl-O-Skreem Spooktacula.

Witch Hazel appears in the Teen Titans Go! episode, "Warner Bros. 100th Anniversary". She is among the Looney Tunes characters guests for the Warner Bros. centennial celebration.

Witch Hazel appears in the movie Coyote vs. Acme, where she works as a clerk at the Avery, Jones & Maltese law firm.

=== Witch Lezah ===
The 2011 animated series The Looney Tunes Show introduces Witch Hazel renamed to Witch Lezah. Lezah ("Hazel" spelled backwards) is voiced by Roz Ryan, who gives the character a pronounced black accent. In the series, she is Gossamer's mother. Unlike the other characters and her original character, she is always serious and gives advice that is not nonsensical and is more calm. She has a contradictory relationship with Daffy; she once threatened him into helping Gossamer make friends. Once Gossamer has friends she asks Daffy to stay away despite all his hard work. She has been a hypnotherapist by trade, as seen in "Point, Laser Point", where she provided Sylvester with services when he was in denial about his relationship with his mother. In "It's a Handbag", she helped Daffy recall who took his handbag. In "Best Friends Redux", Witch Lezah has a time portal in her home, which Daffy uses to jealously ensure that Bugs Bunny and Rodney Rabbit never meet. When nobody knows Daffy, Witch Lezah, who is unaffected by the time change, sends Daffy back in time to correct it, as it's ultimately because of Rodney that Bugs and Daffy met and became friends. Daffy uses Witch Lezah's time portal again to make sure he and Porky Pig meet.
