= Hare We Go =

- Directed by: Robert McKimson
- Story by: Warren Foster
- Starring: Mel Blanc; Bea Benaderet (Queen Isabella)
- Music by: Carl Stalling
- Animation by: Phil DeLara; Charles McKimson; John Carey; Rod Scribner; J.C. Melendez
- Layouts by: Cornett Wood
- Backgrounds by: Richard H. Thomas
- Color process: Technicolor
- Production company: Warner Bros. Cartoons
- Distributed by: Warner Bros. Pictures
- Release date: January 6, 1951
- Running time: 7:23
- Country: United States
- Language: English

Hare We Go is a 1951 Warner Bros. Merrie Melodies cartoon directed by Robert McKimson. The short was released on January 6, 1951, and features Bugs Bunny. The title is a pun on the phrase "here we go".

== Plot ==
In 1492 Christopher Columbus is arguing with the king of Spain whether the world is round or flat. Columbus suggests that the Earth is round like an apple or a human head. King Ferdinand insists the Earth is flat like a pancake (and Columbus' head, after flattening it with his scepter). Eventually the king kicks Columbus out of his palace. Then Bugs Bunny emerges from his rabbit hole and asks Columbus what's bothering him. Columbus says that no one believes his theory, but Bugs, after looking at Columbus' globe, says "She looks round to me, Doc." Queen Isabella speaks (like a Mae West impersonation) to Bugs and Columbus from a window, offering him her jewels if he can prove the world is round. Bugs tells Columbus that he can prove that the world is round. He takes out a baseball and glove and throws the ball "around the world." When the ball returns to Spain, it is covered in travel stickers from all over the globe, proving Columbus' claim.

After this, Columbus sets sail and Bugs accompanies him as a mascot. The crew thinks Bugs is bad luck and as time passes and there is no sight of land, these feelings grow stronger. When Columbus tells Bugs that they will hit land the next day, he hurries to tell the crew and celebrate with them.

Many weeks pass by without finding any land. The crew decide it is all Bugs' fault, and chase him around the ship, with the intent to kill him. Bugs tricks them into jumping overboard by having them look through a telescope pointed at pictures of landscapes, and jumping through a painting on the side of the ship. After this, all the boats that were following Columbus leave. Now it is only Bugs and Columbus. As Bugs serves Columbus the little portion of food left, Columbus pictures Bugs as a piece of meat and begins to chase him with the intent to eat him.

As this chase is going on, the boat hits land and Bugs falls overboard onto it. As he claims to have discovered America, Columbus (standing on high ground with the Spanish flag) makes the same claim. Bugs lets Columbus have the credit as there's "no use changing all the history books just for little ol' me."

== Notes ==
The joke where a baseball is thrown around the world to prove that the world is round, returning with travel stickers on the ball was used in an earlier Looney Tunes cartoon, namely Bob Clampett's Kristopher Kolumbus, Jr. (1939), which starred Porky Pig.

== Sources ==
Preceded by Rabbit of Seville	Bugs Bunny Cartoons; 1951	Succeeded by Rabbit Every Monday
