= Rabbit Every Monday =

- Directed by: I. Freleng
- Story by: Friz Freleng (uncredited)
- Starring: Mel Blanc (all voices)
- Music by: Carl Stalling
- Animation by: Manuel Perez; Ken Champin; Virgil Ross; Art Davis
- Layouts by: Hawley Pratt
- Backgrounds by: Paul Julian
- Color process: Technicolor
- Production company: Warner Bros. Cartoons
- Distributed by: Warner Bros. Pictures
- Release date: February 10, 1951
- Running time: 7:23
- Language: English

Rabbit Every Monday is a 1951 Warner Bros. Looney Tunes cartoon directed by Friz Freleng. The short was released on February 10, 1951, and stars Bugs Bunny and Yosemite Sam. The title is a play on Chicken Every Sunday. This is one of the cartoons where Bugs and Sam are both winners in the end.

It is the last short to feature Sam's mouth below his mustache; his design changes midway through the film.

Rabbit Every Monday has the distinction of being the first Looney Tunes cartoon to appear on the first episode of The Bugs Bunny Show, on October 11, 1960.

== Plot ==
"What's Up? Your Time's Up Rabbit!"

Bugs is cooking carrots on a rotisserie and singing a parody of the song "It's Magic" (from the 1948 Warner Bros. film Romance on the High Seas). Yosemite Sam is hunting and, when he smells carrots cooking, knows he must be close to a rabbit. In a "breaking the fourth wall" moment, a patron in the movie theater leaves his seat and passes in front of the screen. Sam points his rifle at him and orders him back to his seat. Sam then issues a warning to the rest of the audience. He reaches Bugs' hole and Bugs, thinking that Sam's nose is a carrot, flavours it, yanks it, and Sam, into his hole and bites the nose.

Sam jumps above ground, sticks the gun down the hole and commands Bugs to come out. Bugs emerges from Sam's gun and says, "What's up Doc?", to which Sam replies, "Your time is up, rabbit!" and demands he remove himself from the gun. Bugs refuses so Sam releases a gun shell, which Bugs is inside of. He says to Bugs, "Now start prayin', cuz I'm a-blowin' ya to smithereenies at the count of ten!" Bugs quickly chews bubble gum and sticks it into the gun. The gun backfires, surrounds Sam with a bubble and Bugs blows him down a cliff. As Sam is blowing his way back up, Bugs bursts the bubble with a pin. After a very "sticky" situation, Sam digs around the hole with Bugs in it, puts him in a sieve and proceeds to filter Bugs out. He then takes Bugs, by gunpoint, to his cabin - "Now, ya carrot-chewin' coyote, git a-goin'!".

Bugs is hanging on a wall while Sam puts wood in the oven. After Bugs manages a few annoyances for Sam concerning his hat, he is obliged to go into the oven. He exits it several times and takes back in some items: a fan, a pitcher of water ("Hot in there"), chairs, and party favors. He empties ashtrays into Sam's hat and asks him to see if he can 'scare up a few more'. Sam gets mad. The next time Bugs pops from the stove (covered with lipstick), he tells Sam there is a party going on and invites him in. Sam spruces himself up a bit and enters the oven. Bugs comes out and starts putting more wood in the fire, but begins having regrets about having fooled Sam. When he takes a look inside, Bugs sees that the party is real (a live-action clip from Romance on the High Seas) and Sam is heard enjoying himself. Bugs enthusiastically dives in. At the end of the cartoon, he pokes his head from the oven door, wearing a hat and waving party favors. He says to the audience, in the manner of Jerry Colonna, "I don't ask questions; I just have fun!".

== Alternate versions ==
- When the short was used in the 1979 Bugs Bunny's Thanksgiving Diet special, the "dancing girls" clip seen by Bugs was replaced with a scene of people dancing in a disco-themed setting. Also, the original music playing when Bugs walks out was replaced with music contemporary to the late 1970s, and new dialogue was substituted for the segments in which the disco music was played.

== Popular culture ==
- The end scene of "Rabbit Every Monday" is parodied in the Married... with Children season 8 episode, "The Worst Noel." The episode involves Al and Peggy Bundy's neighbors Jefferson and Marcy D'Arcy entering the Bundy house and taking several items including a few chairs. While the Darcys are visiting the Bundy house, the front door is open and the Christmas song "Deck the Halls" can be heard.

== See also ==
- Looney Tunes and Merrie Melodies filmography (1950–1959)
- List of Bugs Bunny cartoons
- List of Yosemite Sam cartoons

| Preceded by Hare We Go | Bugs Bunny Cartoons; 1951 | Succeeded by Bunny Hugged |
