= Bugs Bunny's Christmas Carol =

1979 animated Christmas film by Friz Freleng

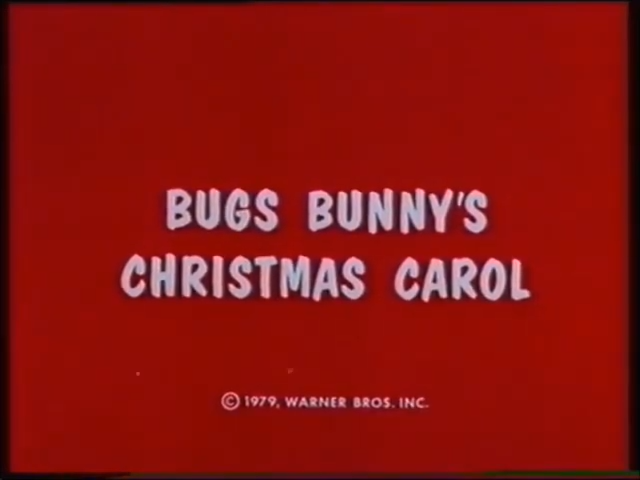
- Based on: A Christmas Carol by Charles Dickens
- Screenplay by: Tony Benedict; John W. Dunn; Friz Freleng
- Directed by: Friz Freleng
- Starring: Mel Blanc (all voices)
- Music by: Doug Goodwin
- Country of origin: United States
- Original language: English

Production
- Producer: Hal Geer
- Editors: Richard S. Gannon; Robert T. Gillis
- Running time: 8 minutes
- Production companies: DePatie–Freleng Enterprises; Warner Bros. Television

Original release
- Network: CBS
- Release: November 27, 1979

Bugs Bunny's Christmas Carol is an eight-minute animated film produced by Warner Bros. Television and DePatie–Freleng Enterprises, and aired on CBS on November 27, 1979 as the first segment of the Christmas special, Bugs Bunny's Looney Christmas Tales.

The cartoon is an adaptation of the Charles Dickens 1843 novella A Christmas Carol, featuring Yosemite Sam as Ebenezer Scrooge, Porky Pig as Bob Cratchit, and Tweety Bird as Tiny Tim. Bugs Bunny plays the ghost of Jacob Marley and Scrooge's nephew, Fred. Scrooge's dream-journey into his past, present, and future is omitted; instead, Fred dresses up as Marley's ghost to scare the unhappy protagonist straight.

== Plot ==
Scrooge is counting money in the counting house of his firm when Bob Cratchit comes in, wanting to borrow a lump of coal as he is freezing. Scrooge refuses ("I gave you a lump of coal a week ago; you should've made it last."), and tells him to just work faster so he'll keep warm. Then Scrooge's nephew Fred comes in with Christmas decorations and mistletoe. He is tossed out, and decides that "somebody oughta teach that little man some Christmas spiriting". Fred then borrows a piece of coal and places it in the office of Cratchit, who graciously thanks him.

However, Scrooge's cat Sylvester notices this and warns him. Scrooge takes back the coal, throwing him out along with the carolers Elmer Fudd, Pepe Le Pew and Foghorn Leghorn whom Fred let into the office, and fires Cratchit...who invites Fred to dinner. Fred is introduced to Bob's wife and their offspring, including youngest son Tim. Suddenly, the local Light Company shows up and takes the Cratchits' last candle (because their bill is past due). After that comes a notice, from none other than Scrooge, that the family's mortgage is being foreclosed; the Cratchits must vacate their house by midnight. Fred angrily vows to save Bob's domicile however he can.

Fred starts by annoying Scrooge with more carolers; when Scrooge goes out to deal with this, he slips in a pile of snow. Next, Fred puts snow into Scrooge's hot bath, turning it ice-cold as Scrooge jumps in. Fred then dresses up as the ghost of Scrooge's late business partner Jacob Marley...dragging around chains and beats a drum. Investigating, Scrooge accidentally slips down the stairs and into the cold along with Sylvester. When they return to bed, the ghost of Marley reappears. Sylvester promptly flees, slamming the door behind him and cutting off Scrooge. The ghost of Marley threatens to take Scrooge to see "the man in the red suit" (the Devil, though Scrooge first guesses Santa Claus).

Scrooge promptly changes his ways for the better. To prove himself reformed, he dresses up as Santa Claus and runs through the streets at night...shouting "MERRY CHRISTMAS!" and pelting total strangers with fistfuls of cash. He also rehires Bob Cratchit by making his new partner in the firm, succeeding Marley. Tweety raises a toast to him, and Fred kisses him. Scrooge (now going by the name of Sam) still hates kissing, though.

This story is the first part of Bugs Bunny's Looney Christmas Tales. As the second one featuring Wile E. Coyote and The Roadrunner (Freeze Frame) begins, Bugs congratulates Sam for making Scrooge a charitable character, but Sam tells Bugs that it was all a play, and demands Porky and the gang give all his money back to him.

== Cast ==
- Mel Blanc as Ebenezer Scrooge, Fred, Bob Cratchit, Tiny Tim Cratchit, Elmer Fudd, Pepé, Foggy, Sylvester, Tweety and Ghost of Jacob Marley

== See also ==
- List of A Christmas Carol adaptations
- List of Christmas films
- List of Yosemite Sam cartoons
- List of Bugs Bunny cartoons
- List of Porky Pig cartoons
- List of cartoons featuring Sylvester

Preceded by False Hare	Bugs Bunny Cartoons; 1979	Succeeded by The Fright Before Christmas
