= The Fair-Haired Hare =

1951 cartoon film by Friz Freleng

- Directed by: I. Freleng
- Story by: Warren Foster
- Starring: Mel Blanc
- Music by: Carl Stalling
- Animation by: Ken Champin; Virgil Ross; Arthur Davis; Manuel Perez; John Carey
- Layouts by: Hawley Pratt
- Backgrounds by: Paul Julian
- Color process: Technicolor
- Production company: Warner Bros. Cartoons
- Distributed by: Warner Bros. Pictures
- Release date: April 14, 1951
- Running time: 7 minutes 11 seconds
- Language: English

The Fair-Haired Hare is a 1951 Warner Bros. Looney Tunes cartoon starring Bugs Bunny and Yosemite Sam. Released April 14, 1951, the cartoon was directed by Friz Freleng. The voices were performed by Mel Blanc.

The Fair-Haired Hare was the first short released in which Yosemite Sam was drawn with his mouth in his red mustache for the entire film. It is also one of the few cartoons where Sam refers to Bugs by name, and is also one of the few where Sam actually attempts to save Bugs from danger.

In the film, Bugs and Sam have their respective residences located in close proximity. They argue over property rights on the land which they both claim, and they are forced to share it by a court decision. The decision also declares them to be each other's legal heirs, and Sam is ready to kill to get his inheritance.

== Plot ==
Bugs Bunny—contentedly singing "Home on the Range", adding in that rabbits also live on the prairie—is startled after Yosemite Sam builds a cabin above his rabbit hole. Bugs tries to find out what's going on, interrupting Sam's banjo rendition of "I Can't Get Along, Little Dogie" (M.K. Jerome/Jack Scholl); Sam attributes this disturbance to mice. Bugs saws a hole and climbs out through a bearskin rug. Its mouth closes as Bugs is halfway out, causing the bunny to panic; Sam sees this and shoots the rug repeatedly ("Playin' possum for 20 years! That'll learn ya!"). The two then begin quarreling over who has rights to the property; Bugs claims he was there first and should live there undisturbed ("Oh, uh, there must be some mistake. You see, through some error you built your house on my property. I'm afraid I'll have to ask ya to move it, doc."), while Sam isn't interested in listening to a rabbit's opinion ("What?! Ooh, listen, rabbit! Yosemite Sam never makes a mistake! Now get that flea-bitten carcass offin' my real estate! AND stay out!")

Bugs decides this may be a civil matter and plans to go to "the highest court in the country"—which they do: It is literally the "highest court" in the land, the courthouse being atop a mountain [elevation: 6,723 feet (2,049 m)]. There, the judge declares that both Bugs and Sam shall share the land equally ... "and in the event that one of you should pass on, the other shall inherit the entire property." Sam chuckles evilly, making Bugs uneasy.

The rest of the cartoon sees Sam trying to kill Bugs, but all of his schemes go awry:

- That night, the two bunk in the same bedroom, their beds on opposite sides of a window. After Sam turns out the light ("Good night, varmint!", "Uh, good night."), Sam tries sneaking over to Bugs' bed in the dark to klonk him on the head. Bugs turns on the light in time, causing Sam to make the hasty excuse, "Carpet keeps rolling up!" (he does this as he pretends to bang the floor). After turning off the light again ("Good night, critter!"), Sam makes a second attempt, and indeed someone does suffer a concussion—Sam, as Bugs has hit his antagonist on the head ("There, that oughta keep that carpet flat!", "Good night, varmint, critter!").
- At breakfast the next morning, Sam prepares glasses of carrot juice for himself and Bugs, and spikes Bugs' glass with an unnamed explosive poison (while Bugs is in the bathroom). However, Bugs is wise and when they sit at the table with the drinks, he rotates it to trade the drug-laced drink with Sam's drink. When Sam rotates them back, Bugs challenges Sam to a makeshift game of roulette ("Round she goes! Where she stops, nobody knows!"). Sam loses his patience and orders Bugs to drink at gunpoint. Bugs finally does, and after Sam drinks his first, but nothing happens to Bugs, making Sam realize that he has consumed the poison-spiked drink, moments before he blasts off into the sky.

Sam runs back and immediately chases Bugs back into his hole. He then realizes the only way to kill off the rabbit is to pack his hole with explosives. However, Bugs diverts the dynamite under the house foundation. Sam then lights the fuse, but realizes too late that his house is about to be blown up. In the end, Bugs watches from his unharmed hole as the cabin flies straight up into the air, much like how the cabin did in the tornado in the 1939 film adaptation of The Wizard of Oz. A dazed Sam stumbles out onto his house's front porch and, upon realizing his fate, remarks: "Well, whaddya know, I've got a cabin in the sky!", as his house continues to fly upward.

== See also ==
- List of Bugs Bunny cartoons
- List of Yosemite Sam cartoons

Preceded by Bunny Hugged	Bugs Bunny Cartoons; 1951	Succeeded by Rabbit Fire
