= The Fifth-Column Mouse =

1943 film by Isadore Freleng

- Original title card
- Directed by: Isadore Freleng
- Story by: Michael Maltese
- Produced by: Leon Schlesinger
- Starring: Mel Blanc
- Music by: Carl W. Stalling
- Animation by: Ken Champin
- Color process: Technicolor
- Production company: Leon Schlesinger Productions
- Distributed by: Warner Bros. Pictures
- Release date: March 6, 1943
- Running time: 7 min
- Country: United States
- Language: English

The Fifth-Column Mouse (Note: The 1950 Merrie Melodies Blue Ribbon reissue omits the word "The" from the title card.) is a 1943 American animated comedy short film directed by Isadore Freleng. The short was released on March 6, 1943. It is part of the Merrie Melodies series. It was re-released as a "Blue Ribbon" reissue in 1950 as Fifth Column Mouse, rendering the original film lost, though Michael Maltese kept the title and credits cels.

The cartoon features a band of mice who engage in war against a cat. This is a wartime propaganda film, with the cat symbolizing the Axis powers. A single mouse represents the fifth column, working for the cat and suggesting an appeasement policy.

== Plot ==
Blue Ribbon edition of the short.

The short film begins with a pleasant group of brown mice who are - to the tune of "Ain't We Got Fun" - enjoying various water sports and other fun activities in and around a kitchen sink. Lurking just outside the house is a sinister cat; after he gets inside he gains the confidence of a dim-witted grey mouse who has already underestimated the predator. The cat persuades the easily manipulated rodent - via a promise of cheese, "all you want" - to impress upon the brown mice that he, the cat, is there to save them when, in actuality, he will enslave them.

The grey mouse follows the cat's orders and convinces his compatriots to appease. The brown mice indeed become slaves to the cat, fulfilling his every desire. Finally, he openly states that he wants to eat "a nice, fat, tender mouse". The brown mice flee; the grey mouse runs to join them when the cat turns his appetite toward him. The newly formed brown mouse united alliance prepares for war, constructing a 'secret weapon' to even the upcoming battle: a mechanical bulldog. The ensuing chase forces the cat from the house after being shaved nearly bald. As the brown mice celebrate the victory, the grey mouse tries to claim partial credit (quoting Red Skelton's line "I Dood it"); in response, he is immediately pied.

== Home media ==
The Fifth-Column Mouse was released on Bugs & Daffy: The Wartime Cartoons (1989), and later on the Looney Tunes Golden Collection: Volume 6 DVD set. The cartoon is now in the public domain.

== See also ==
- List of World War II short films
