= Shake Your Powder Puff =

1934 film by Isadore Freleng

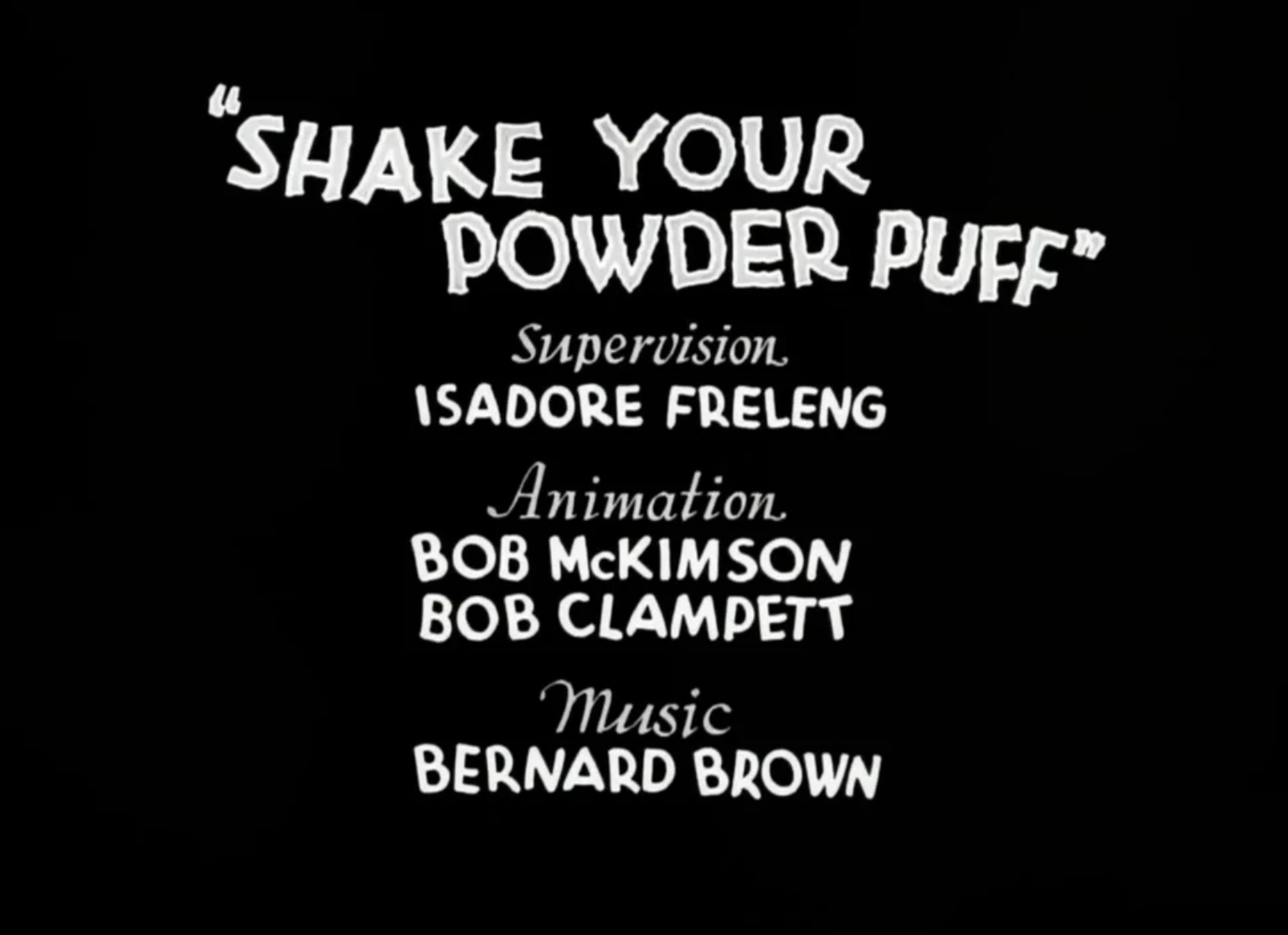
- Title card
- Directed by: Isadore Freleng
- Produced by: Leon Schlesinger
- Starring: The Varsity Three
- Music by: Bernard Brown
- Animation by: Bob McKimson; Bob Clampett
- Production company: Leon Schlesinger Productions
- Distributed by: Warner Bros. Productions; The Vitaphone Corporation
- Release date: October 17, 1934
- Running time: 6 minutes
- Country: United States
- Language: English

Shake Your Powder Puff is a 1934 American animated comedy short film directed by Isadore Freleng. The short was released on October 17, 1934. It is the 39th film in the Merrie Melodies series, featuring the titular song from the film Upperworld.

== Plot ==
A performance is held at a barn, with the banner lit up by fireflies. Animals enter the barn while the performers adjust their instruments. A conductor resembling Leopold Stokowski emerges from a piano and is angered when everyone hushes each other quiet, which ironically makes a lot of noise. The first song plays, with humorously disruptive noises by animals that are apparently part of the performance. The conductor accidentally destroys his platform, and ends the performance disappointed.

The next performance features three white rabbits which sing the titular song while other animals provide the scenery; they are joined in by three Donald Duck lookalikes. Two dogs perform a vaudeville act, entertaining the entire crowd except for one drunken dog, who boos them and is thrown out. He angrily returns twice and fails.

The dog finds pepper in a nearby cart, causing him to plot revenge. After three identical pigs which differ in size perform the song, followed by six chicken dancers, the dog sprays pepper into the audience, causing them to sneeze and blow the feathers off the dancers. He accidentally falls into the stage and is pelted with fruit. The dog is also pelted with a squash after he says "That's all, folks!" in the end card.

== Home media ==
The short is available on disc 1 of the Looney Tunes Collector's Vault: Volume 3 Blu-ray set.
