= Bugs and Daffy's Carnival of the Animals =

1976 film by Chuck Jones

- VHS cover
- Written by: Chuck Jones; Ogden Nash
- Directed by: Chuck Jones
- Starring: Mel Blanc; Michael Tilson Thomas
- Music by: Camille Saint-Saëns
- Country of origin: United States

Production
- Producer: Chuck Jones
- Running time: 23 minutes
- Production company: Chuck Jones Enterprises

Original release
- Network: CBS
- Release: November 22, 1976

Bugs and Daffy's Carnival of the Animals (originally aired on TV as Carnival of the Animals) is a 1976 live action/animated television special featuring the Looney Tunes characters Bugs Bunny and Daffy Duck and directed by Chuck Jones.

The special, based on Camille Saint-Saëns' musical suite The Carnival of the Animals and consisting of entirely new animation, was purposely cast in the successful mold of Jones' own earlier musical cartoons (including Rabbit of Seville, Long-Haired Hare and Baton Bunny), and set the familiar showbiz rivalry between Bugs and Daffy against the orchestral backdrop of conductor Michael Tilson Thomas, in a performance based on Saint-Saëns' music and Ogden Nash's poetry.

Carnival of the Animals originally aired on CBS on November 22, 1976, and was the first Warner Bros.-commissioned work featuring Bugs Bunny following the release of the cartoon False Hare, as well as their first Looney Tunes production following the third closure of their original animation studio on October 10, 1969.

This is an abridged version of the work, omitting the "Tortoise", "Characters with Long Ears", "Cuckoo" and "Swan" movements and using the "Pianists" music (with added resolution) over the ending credits; Bugs and Daffy also use a part of "Characters with Long Ears" (Bugs for piano, Daffy for the poem) while they are reciting the movement "Wild Jackass".

== Production ==
=== Behind the scenes ===
Prime-time television would seem to be the natural place for the adult humor of Warner's classic cartoons, as was exemplified by the success of The Bugs Bunny Show that aired Tuesday evenings on ABC in the early 1960s. However, in the mid-1960s, the Warner Bros. cartoons had become established as kiddie entertainment. By 1968, executives at CBS were convinced that all animated material, no matter what its original intended audience had been, belonged exclusively on Saturday mornings. However, the popular characters of Looney Tunes and Merrie Melodies intentionally had enduring adult appeal from the first, and with the success of other prime-time television specials such as the various Peanuts specials that were being produced at the time, network programmers were finally convinced to give the Warner Bros. animated characters another chance in prime time.

According to animation historians Kevin McCorry and Jon Cooke:

Cartoon characters, appearing in holiday-related, half-hour features, could be relied upon to garner respectable ratings and advertising revenue. Further, with the reduction of regular series episodes per season to below 26, specials were needed to fill the gaps in the 52 weeks that constituted a television season.

This special marked the first time since Warner Bros. had closed their studios in 1964 that Bugs Bunny had appeared on-screen with new material. (Bugs, unlike most of the other regular Looney Tunes characters, had not appeared in any of the outsourced productions distributed under the Warner Bros. banner from 1964 to 1969.)

=== Credits ===
==== Cast ====
- Mel Blanc as Bugs Bunny, Daffy Duck, and Porky Pig (voice characterizations)
- Michael Tilson Thomas as Himself (the conductor)

==== Crew ====
- Cinematography by Wally Bulloch
- Production Design by Herbert Klynn
- Animation by:
  - Phil Monroe
  - Manny Perez
  - Tom Ray
  - Lloyd Vaughan
  - Ben Washam
- Produced, written, and directed by Chuck Jones

== Availability ==
Bugs and Daffy's Carnival of the Animals was released on VHS, and later on the Looney Tunes Golden Collection: Volume 5 DVD along with Bugs Bunny's Bustin' Out All Over and Bugs Bunny's Looney Christmas Tales.

== See also ==
- List of Bugs Bunny cartoons
- List of Daffy Duck cartoons
