= Naughty Neighbors =

1939 film by Robert Clampett

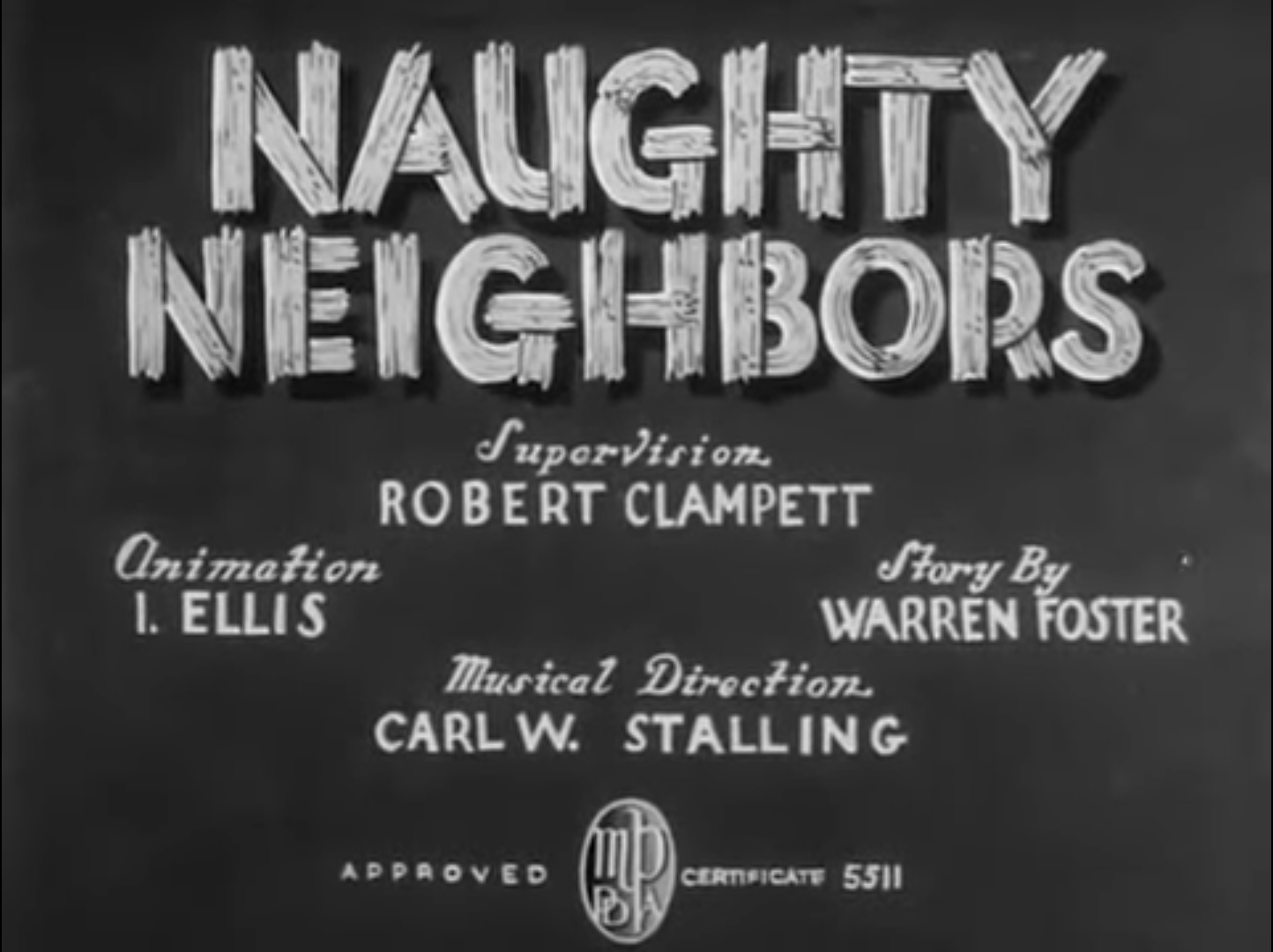
- Title card
- Directed by: Robert Clampett
- Story by: Warren Foster
- Produced by: Leon Schlesinger
- Starring: Mel Blanc; Bernice Hansen; Danny Webb
- Music by: Carl W. Stalling
- Animation by: Isadore Ellis
- Production company: Leon Schlesinger Productions
- Distributed by: Warner Bros. Pictures
- Release date: October 7, 1939
- Running time: 6 minutes
- Country: United States
- Language: English

Naughty Neighbors is a 1939 American animated comedy short film directed by Robert Clampett. The short was released on October 7, 1939. It is part of the Looney Tunes series, the 65th cartoon to feature Porky Pig and the fifth and final cartoon to star Petunia Pig. It is a parody of the Hatfield–McCoy feud.

== Plot ==
In "Kaintucky", the Martins and McCoys, families consisting of different animals, feud and shoot over the boundary line between their territory. This ends when their leaders, Petunia Pig and Porky Pig, decide to sign a non-aggression pact, partially because they have fallen in love with each other. Ducks and geese struggle to face a future of peace and unity, alternating between peacefully tolerating each other's company and beating up each other. Petunia leads Porky into the Martins' home as they sing merrily. To their horror, the ducks and geese instigate another feud, so Porky rushes home to retrieve a "feud pacifier" grenade, which magically ends the feud permanently. Able to continue their relationship safely, Porky and Petunia kiss.

== Home media ==
Naughty Neighbors is available on disc 4 of the Porky Pig 101 DVD set.

== See also ==
- Porky Pig filmography
- Looney Tunes and Merrie Melodies filmography (1930–1939)
