= A-Haunting We Will Go (1966 film) =

- Title card
- Directed by: Robert McKimson
- Produced by: David H. DePatie; Friz Freleng
- Starring: Mel Blanc; June Foray
- Edited by: Al Wahrman
- Music by: William Lava
- Animation by: Manny Perez; Warren Batchelder; Bob Matz; George Grandpré
- Layouts by: Dick Ung
- Backgrounds by: Tom O'Loughlin
- Color process: Technicolor
- Production company: DePatie–Freleng Enterprises
- Distributed by: Warner Bros. Pictures; The Vitaphone Corporation
- Release date: April 16, 1966
- Running time: 7 minutes
- Country: United States
- Language: English

A-Haunting We Will Go is a 1966 Warner Bros. Looney Tunes cartoon directed by Robert McKimson. The short was released on April 16, 1966, and stars Daffy Duck, Speedy Gonzales and Witch Hazel.

== Plot ==
During Halloween, Daffy Duck's nephew, dressed as a witch, goes trick-or-treating and visits Witch Hazel's house. Terrified by her appearance, he runs home to tell Daffy, who dismisses his fears and decides to prove that witches do not exist by visiting Hazel himself.

Meanwhile, Witch Hazel, lamenting her constant work, seeks a stand-in so she can take a vacation. She transforms Speedy Gonzales into her double using a special piece of cheese. Although Speedy retains his usual energetic behavior, Hazel deems it acceptable and leaves for Hawaii.

When Daffy arrives at Hazel's house, Speedy, disguised as Hazel, serves him tea made from potions, turning Daffy into a flower-headed creature. Hazel returns, reverts Speedy to his mouse form, and considers cooking Daffy for dinner. She transforms Daffy back to his original state, but he escapes, only to find himself parachuting with an anvil after jumping from her broomstick.

Back on the ground, Daffy is frightened by his nephew, still in his witch costume. He reassures his nephew that witchcraft is mere superstition, unaware that he has once again turned into the flower-headed creature on their way home.

== Additional crew and cast ==
- June Foray voices Witch Hazel
- All other voices are provided by Mel Blanc
- Additional Animation: Norm McCabe and Don Towsley
- Archive Footage directed by Chuck Jones and Abe Levitow

== Production notes ==
This is the final Looney Tunes cartoon to feature Witch Hazel and June Foray's voice acting during the Golden Age of American animation. However, Foray reprised her role as Witch Hazel in a 2003 episode of Duck Dodgers. The cartoon incorporates reused animation of Witch Hazel from Broom-Stick Bunny and features Daffy as the flower-headed creature from Duck Amuck, both directed by Chuck Jones.

== See also ==
- List of films set around Halloween
- List of films about witchcraft
