= Boobs in the Woods =

1950 film by Robert McKimson

- Title card
- Directed by: Robert McKimson
- Story by: Warren Foster
- Starring: Mel Blanc
- Music by: Carl Stalling
- Animation by: Phil DeLara; J.C. Melendez; Emery Hawkins; Charles McKimson; Pete Burness
- Layouts by: Cornett Wood
- Backgrounds by: Richard H. Thomas
- Color process: Technicolor
- Production company: Warner Bros. Cartoons
- Distributed by: Warner Bros. Pictures
- Release date: January 28, 1950
- Running time: 6:56
- Country: United States
- Language: English

Boobs in the Woods is a 1950 Warner Bros. Looney Tunes cartoon, directed by Robert McKimson. The cartoon was released on January 28, 1950, and stars Daffy Duck and Porky Pig.

== Plot ==
Porky sets up camp to enjoy the countryside, painting a landscape interrupted by Daffy's antics. When Daffy tries to thwart Porky's painting, a series of absurd encounters unfold, including a confrontation with the old man of the mountains and a faux execution. Despite Daffy's tricks, Porky manages to catch a fish, leading to further shenanigans involving licenses and mistaken identities. Eventually, Porky tries to escape Daffy's antics by packing up his trailer, but Daffy sabotages his car. In a twist, Porky gains the upper hand by revealing a license to use Daffy as a motor, ultimately outwitting the duck.

== Cast ==
- Mel Blanc as Daffy Duck, Porky Pig

== Home media ==
- DVD – Looney Tunes Golden Collection: Volume 1
- DVD – Looney Tunes Super Stars' Porky & Friends: Hilarious Ham
- Blu-ray – Looney Tunes Collector's Vault: Volume 3

== See also ==
- List of Daffy Duck cartoons
- List of Porky Pig cartoons
