= Guided Muscle =

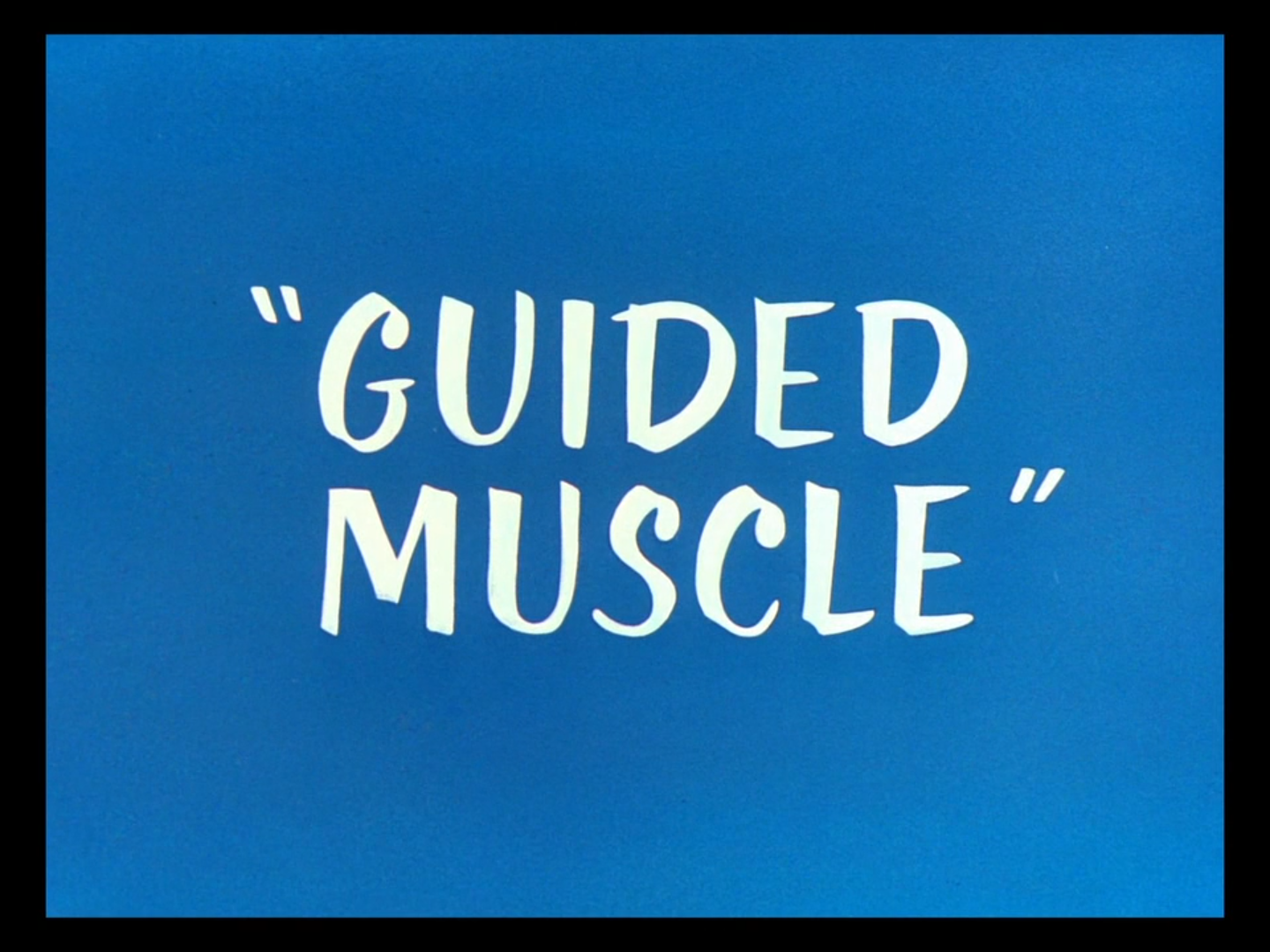
- Directed by: Charles M. Jones
- Written by: Michael Maltese
- Music by: Carl Stalling
- Animation by: Richard Thompson; Ken Harris; Ben Washam; Abe Levitow
- Layouts by: Phillip DeGuard
- Backgrounds by: Richard H. Thomas
- Production company: Warner Bros. Cartoons
- Distributed by: Warner Bros. Pictures
- Release date: December 10, 1955
- Running time: 6:40
- Country: United States

Guided Muscle is a 1955 Warner Bros. Looney Tunes cartoon directed by Chuck Jones. The short was released on December 10, 1955, and stars Wile E. Coyote and the Road Runner.

== Plot ==
Wile E. Coyote is cooking some food in a tin bucket over a fire. He adds pepper and a drop of a brown liquid, stirs the bucket and fishes out what is revealed to be a tin can. The Coyote then sits down on a rock and prepares to cut the can in half (as if it was a steak) before he realizes what he is eating, and then pushes the entire table setting off the rock table. The camera then freezes to show "COYOTE - Eatibus almost anythingus". With a Beep-beep, the Road Runner speeds by and throws the coyote rolling across the ground. The camera cuts to the Road Runner, who is currently a blur of motion, and freezes the clip temporarily to add his fictitious Binomial nomenclature in Dog Latin: Velocitus Delectiblus. Wile E. licks his lips, then dashes after his nemesis. The Road Runner taunts Wile E. with a Beep-beep before blasting into Mach 225, disappearing beyond the 10-mile horizon in only 5 frames of film, dusting up all the roads in the distance. Wile stops in mid-stride and points at the bird as if to say "Did you see that?", then thinks of his new plan on the next scheme.

1. The Coyote attaches an arrowhead to the end of his nose and shoots himself from a bow at the passing Road Runner, but instead spears through the trunk of a saguaro cactus, which breaks out of the ground and falls over a cliff.

2. Wile then loads himself into a slingshot and cuts the string as the Road Runner dashes ahead of him, but nothing happens. He ducks out of the slingshot and puts his head into it to peer at the "faulty" string, but then it activates and pitches the Coyote onto the stone ground 10 feet away.

3. The Coyote lies in wait for the Road Runner to come around a turn and lights a cannon fuse, but instead of firing the cannonball, the entire cannon, with Wile on board, is fired backwards into a mountain wall. When Wile steps out of the cannon, it fires another ball into his face.

4. He then attempts to use a stone "wrecking ball" attached to a tree to hit the Road Runner, but instead hits the trunk of the tree, which hammers him into the rock he is standing on.

5. Next, Wile simply rolls the ball down a hill out into the road, but it pitches up a stone serac and right back on top of its owner.

6. Wile covers a narrow canyon floor with Acme GREASE, but once again, a truck just happens to be approaching. He tries to run across the grease, but fails and is run over. The Road Runner easily glides over it, so he attempts to follow. However, each attempt moves him forward a negligible amount of distance until he finally collapses in the grease.

7. The Road Runner is then seen zipping to one end of a cliff and beeping at the Coyote on the other end, who attempts to swing over the canyon but only smacks into a plateau just underneath him.

8. Wile leaves out birdseed while he climbs to the top of the cliff and prepares his trap. The Road Runner zips up and munches down, while the Coyote lowers a dynamite stick on the end of a fishing line. Instead of blowing up the Road Runner, the flame travels up the line and back to the TNT box, which explodes on the Coyote.

9. He then creates a tar-and-feather machine based on his readings of How To Tar And Feather A Road Runner: 10th printing, and successfully tests it on a small cactus. Wile hides in a thin crevice with the machine pointed towards the road that the Road Runner traverses. Unfortunately, just as Wile E. activates the machine, the emitters are spun around by the Road Runner's speed resulting in them attacking their owner, and the Road Runner, as if it were the simplest thing in the world (which it is), holds up a sign at the Coyote saying: ROAD-RUNNERS ALREADY HAVE FEATHERS!

10. Wile prepares one final trap: a dynamite pit in the road. Just after he lights the fuse, the Road Runner stops short of him and beeps in his face, provoking a short chase that ends when he runs directly over his own exploding pit. Dejected, the charred Coyote walks off-camera and returns with a stand-up sign that says: Wanted: One gullible Coyote. Apply to manager of this theater. Then he goes back and returns with the Looney Tunes "That's all, Folks!" end title card.

== Reception ==
Animation historian Jerry Beck writes, "If I had to pick a 'pure' Road Runner-Coyote film, this would be it. It's one of Chuck Jones' best chase films, produced at the peak of his artistic powers. By this time — this only being the sixth of twenty-three Road Runners that Jones would direct during the golden age — the characters are clearly defined, their motivations firmly established. The gag setups and payoffs are classic. Jones and his team make an art out of split-second timing and extreme facial reactions."

== Crew ==
- Story: Michael Maltese
- Animation: Ken Harris, Richard Thompson, Ben Washam, Abe Levitow
- Layouts: Philip DeGuard
- Backgrounds: Richard H. Thomas
- Effects animation: Harry Love (uncredited)
- Film editor: Treg Brown (uncredited)
- Vocal characterizations: Paul Julian (uncredited)
- Musical direction: Carl Stalling
- Orchestrations: Milt Franklyn (uncredited)
- Directed by: Charles M. Jones

== Production notes ==
Along with The Grey Hounded Hare and Tugboat Granny, Guided Muscle was one of the three cartoons on the final episode of ABC's The Bugs Bunny & Tweety Show, on September 2, 2000.

== See also ==
- Looney Tunes and Merrie Melodies filmography (1950–1959)
