= Little Boy Boo =

- Directed by: Robert McKimson
- Story by: Tedd Pierce
- Starring: Mel Blanc; Gladys Holland (uncredited)
- Edited by: Treg Brown
- Music by: Carl Stalling
- Animation by: Herman Cohen; Rod Scribner; Phil de Lara; Charles McKimson
- Layouts by: Robert Givens
- Backgrounds by: Richard H. Thomas
- Color process: Technicolor
- Production company: Warner Bros. Cartoons
- Distributed by: Warner Bros. Pictures; The Vitaphone Corporation
- Release date: June 5, 1954
- Running time: 7 minutes
- Language: English

Little Boy Boo is a Warner Bros. Looney Tunes animated short directed by Robert McKimson. The cartoon was released on June 5, 1954, and features Foghorn Leghorn, Miss Prissy and Egghead Jr. in his debut appearance.

The cartoon was one of several in the Foghorn Leghorn series utilizing the theme of Foghorn attempting to woo the widowed Miss Prissy by babysitting her gifted son (Egghead, Jr.). The title is a play on the nursery rhyme "Little Boy Blue".

== Plot ==
Fearful of a freezing winter, Foghorn Leghorn attempts to woo Miss Prissy to gain access to her warm cottage. Miss Prissy agrees on the condition that he prove he can be a good father to her bookish and intellectual son Egghead Jr. Foghorn takes Jr. away from his reading a book entitled "Splitting The Fourth Dimension," and attempts to teach Jr. how to play games such as baseball and hide-and-seek; however, Jr. outshines Foghorn in every activity by using advanced scientific calculations.

Later, Jr. is experimenting with a chemistry set. Mistaking a volatile chemical mixture for soda, Foghorn shakes it, causing an explosion that leaves him in a full-body cast. Foghorn returns Jr. home and breaks off his engagement with Miss Prissy, declaring, "I've got my bandages to keep me warm!"

== Voice Cast ==
- Mel Blanc voices Foghorn Leghorn, Egghead Jr.
- Gladys Holland voices Miss Prissy
- Additional Voices are provided by Bea Benaderet

Preceded by Of Rice and Hen	Foghorn Leghorn cartoons 1954	Succeeded by Feather Dusted
