= Tweety's Circus =

1955 film by Friz Freleng

- Title card
- Directed by: I. Freleng
- Story by: Warren Foster
- Starring: Mel Blanc
- Music by: Milt Franklyn
- Animation by: Gerry Chiniquy; Ted Bonnicksen; Arthur Davis
- Layouts by: Hawley Pratt
- Backgrounds by: Irv Wyner
- Color process: Technicolor
- Production company: Warner Bros. Cartoons
- Distributed by: Warner Bros. Pictures
- Release date: June 4, 1955
- Running time: 7 minutes 4 seconds
- Language: English

Tweety's Circus is a 1955 Warner Bros. Merrie Melodies cartoon short directed by Friz Freleng. The short was released on June 4, 1955, and stars Tweety and Sylvester.

== Plot ==
The story centers on Sylvester visiting a circus, where he not tries to catch Tweety for his meal and attempts to one-up a lion (an attraction billed as "King of the Cats").

Sylvester walks into the circus singing his theme "Meow!" where he visits the various animal exhibits. There, upon seeing the lion exhibit, the unimpressed cat immediately expresses his displeasure over the large feline's billing. That changes when he realizes he'd just passed by the Tweety Bird - and thus the chase begins.

Tweety runs into the big top, where the lion, now uncaged, is waiting to maul Sylvester for his earlier remarks (not to mention Sylvester clobbering him with a shovel). From this point forward, the lion serves as both an antagonist for Sylvester and a protector of Tweety. Sylvester tries beating what he thinks is a fire hose to free Tweety, unknowing that the "hose" is an elephant's trunk. The elephant grabs Sylvester with his trunk and—after crushing his chest—throws the battered puss into the lion's cage, where the lion finishes the job.

In the end, Sylvester finally gets rid of the lion ... only to unwittingly lock himself in a cage with even more lions (plus a tiger with them, as well). Tweety immediately takes a hat and cane and becomes a carnival barker ("Huwwy! Huwwy! Huwwy! Step wight up for da gweatest show on Eawth! Fifty wions and one puddy tat!") A loud roar erupts, and with Sylvester presumably having met his fate, Tweety changes his spiel: "Step wight up! Fifty wions, count 'em, fifty wions!"

== Home media ==
This short is available on disc 1 of the Looney Tunes Collector's Vault: Volume 1 Blu-ray set.

== See also ==
- List of American films of 1955

Preceded by Sandy Claws	Tweety and Sylvester cartoons 1955	Succeeded by Red Riding Hoodwinked
