= Broom-Stick Bunny =

1956 film by Chuck Jones

- Title card
- Directed by: Chuck Jones
- Story by: Tedd Pierce
- Starring: Mel Blanc (all other voices); June Foray (Witch Hazel)
- Music by: Milt Franklyn
- Animation by: Richard Thompson; Ken Harris; Ben Washam; Abe Levitow
- Layouts by: Ernie Nordli
- Backgrounds by: Philip De Guard
- Color process: Technicolor
- Production company: Warner Bros. Cartoons
- Distributed by: Warner Bros. Pictures; The Vitaphone Corporation
- Release date: February 25, 1956 (U.S.)
- Running time: 7:09
- Language: English

Broom-Stick Bunny is a 1956 Warner Bros. Looney Tunes short directed by Chuck Jones. The short was released on February 25, 1956, and stars Bugs Bunny. The short is notable for being June Foray's first time working with Jones, though she had previously worked in a couple shorts for other directors. She continued to collaborate with him after Warners' closed their animation department. Foray herself would continue to collaborate with Warner Bros. up until her death.

== Plot ==
On Halloween night, the story opens with a membership plaque to "The Malevolent Order of Witches," which is affiliated with an AF of Elves. Witch Hazel brews a potion while consulting her magic mirror, revealing her fear of aging. Meanwhile, Bugs Bunny, disguised as a witch, visits her for trick-or-treating. Mistaking Bugs for a fellow witch, Hazel becomes jealous when the mirror suggests Bugs is uglier. Devising a plan, she invites Bugs in, intending to use him in her beauty potion.

As Bugs discovers Hazel's intentions, he tries to escape, prompting a comical chase through the house. Hazel, wielding a cleaver, pursues Bugs until he convinces her of his innocence. Moved by his tearful plea, she spares him, but accidentally drinks the beauty potion meant for Bugs, transforming into a stunning redhead, said to be a caricature of her voice actress, June Foray, who used her real voice after the transformation.

Shocked by her own beauty, Hazel seeks validation from her magic mirror, only to find the genie infatuated with her. Terrified, she flees on her broomstick, pursued by the enamored genie on a flying carpet. Bugs, now free, cleverly alerts the authorities to the surreal chase unfolding before him.

== Cast ==
- Mel Blanc as Bugs Bunny, Genie
- June Foray as Witch Hazel (uncredited)

== See also ==
- List of films about witchcraft
- List of films set around Halloween

Preceded by Bugs' Bonnets	Bugs Bunny Cartoons; 1956	Succeeded by Rabbitson Crusoe
