= List of Toon In with Me episodes (2025) =

This is a list of episodes of the American live-action/animated anthology comedy television series Toon In with Me that aired on MeTV in 2025.

== Episodes ==
No. overall	No. in year	Title	Original release date
864	1	"New Year, New Toons"	January 2, 2025
Bill and Toony show six classic cartoons, all of which will be airing for the very first time on Toon In with Me. Featured cartoons: Wrestling Wrecks (1953), The Wacky Worm (1941), Wood-Peckin' (1943), Andy Panda's Victory Garden (1942), A-Hunting We Won't Go (1943), Pesky Pelican (1963)
865	2	"The Cowboy State"	January 6, 2025
Bill and Toony travel to Wyoming for their "Trekkin' All 50" tour of the United States. Featured cartoons: Tweet Tweet Tweety (1951), Pre-Hysterical Man (1948), Barney's Hungry Cousin (1953), Hot Noon (or 12 O'Clock for Sure) (1953), Hip Hip-Hurry! (1958)
866	3	"Throwback Thursday: 1989"	January 9, 2025
Bill and Toony flash back to the rad year of 1989, a year of flashy hammer pants, lip-syncing scandals, and the end of an era for a cartoon legend. Featured cartoons: Trap Happy (1946), Kiddie League (1959), Daffy's Inn Trouble (1961), Roman Legion-Hare (1955), Back Alley Oproar (1948)
867	4	"Trekkin' Thru the Beehive State"	January 10, 2025
Bill and Toony trek through the Beehive State. Featured cartoons: Hairied and Hurried (1965), The Big Snooze (1957), Bee Bopped (1959), Weasel Stop (1956), The Hasty Hare (1952)
868	5	"History's Mysteries"	January 13, 2025
Bill and Toony attempt to solve some of history's greatest mysteries. Featured cartoons: Boston Quackie (1957), Sniffles and the Bookworm (1939), Ship A'hoy Woody (1969), The Jet Cage (1962), Surf-Bored Cat (1967)
869	6	"It's 65!"	January 15, 2025
What a transformation 60 years brings! Bill gives Toony a taste of life in 1965. Featured cartoons: It's Nice to Have a Mouse Around the House (1965), Tom-ic Energy (1965), Two Scent's Worth (1955), Highway Runnery (1965), Rabbitson Crusoe (1956)
870	7	"Catskills Fever"	January 17, 2025
Bill gets invited to a sweet Hall of Fame introduction in the Catskills. Featured cartoons: The Hollywood Bowl (1950), The Bird Came C.O.D. (1942), Taking the Blame (1935), Witty Kitty (1960), Half-Fare Hare (1956)
871	8	"A Day of Days"	January 21, 2025
Bill and Toony embrace all of the holidays that make January 21st special. Featured cartoons: Wild Over You (1953), Lonesome Lenny (1946), The Unhandy Man (1970), Little Red Rodent Hood (1952), No Parking Hare (1954)
872	9	"Shipwrecked"	January 22, 2025
Bill wins an all-expenses paid trip to a deserted island. Featured cartoons: Fair Weather Fiends (1946), Aloha Hooey (1942), Moby Duck (1965), Sliphorn King of Polaroo (1945), Wackiki Wabbit (1943)
873	10	"On This Day... January 23"	January 23, 2025
Bill and Toony host another edition of "On this Day". Featured cartoons: Tweety's S.O.S. (1951), Puppy Tale (1954), A Sheep in the Deep (1962), Bunny Hugged (1951), Operation Sawdust (1953)
874	11	"Panic at the Museum"	January 24, 2025
What begins as a relaxing day trip to a local history museum turns into a overnight fiasco. Featured cartoons: Mouse-Taken Identity (1957), Bone Sweet Bone (1948), Louvre Come Back to Me! (1962), Wild Wild World (1960), Museum Scream (2003)
875	12	"A Taste of Vaudeville"	January 28, 2025
Bill and Toony look back on the art of vaudeville. Featured cartoons: Stage Door Cartoon (1944), Puttin on the Act (1940), Tragic Magic (1962), Betty Boop and the Little King (1936), Little Runaway (1952)
876	13	"It's National Puzzle Day!"	January 29, 2025
A Rubik's Cube master tries to show Bill how to solve the puzzle. Featured cartoons: Trap Happy Porky (1945), Cops is Tops (1955), Wicket Wacky (1951), Speedy Gonzales (1955), Hic-cup Pup (1954)
877	14	"Throwback Thursday: 1962"	January 30, 2025
Bill and Toony boogie through 1962. Featured cartoons: Wet Hare (1962), Science Friction (1963), Dicky Moe (1962), Nelly's Folly (1961), Honey's Money (1962)
878	15	"Back to '85"	January 31, 2025
Bill and Toony time travel back to 1985 to collect some cool stuff. Featured cartoons: Bugs Bunny Rides Again (1948), T.V. of Tomorrow (1953), The Year of the Mouse (1965), Tricky Trout (1961), Stork Naked (1955)
879	16	"Inspiring Women in Black History"	February 3, 2025
Bill and Toony pay tribute to trailblazing African American women. Featured cartoons: The Fair-Haired Hare (1951), Betty Boop's Crazy Inventions (1933), Room and Bird (1951), Muscle Tussle (1953), Barbary-Coast Bunny (1956)
880	17	"*5 Star Critic"	February 4, 2025
Toony aspires to become a food critic with a little help from Bill. Featured cartoons: Shishkabugs (1962), Hot Diggity Dog (1967), Vicious Viking (1967), Jerky Turkey (1968), Devil May Hare (1954)
881	18	"Outhousing"	February 5, 2025
Bill and Toony sign up to compete in an outhouse race. Featured cartoons: Tortoise Wins by a Hare (1943), Onion Pacific (1940), The Cat That Hated People (1948), Betty Boop's Ker-Choo (1933), A Squeak in the Deep (1966)
882	19	"Throwback Thursday: 1992"	February 6, 2025
Bill looks backward at the pop culture of 1992... and dresses backwards, too. Featured cartoons: Rhapsody Rabbit (1946), Mouse into Space (1962), The Mouse on 57th Street (1961), The Genie with the Light Touch (1972), Bugs and Thugs (1954)
883	20	"For the Love of Cartoons"	February 10, 2025
Toon In with Me's Love Week celebration begins. Featured cartoons: The Scarlet Pumpernickel (1950), Red Riding Hoodlum (1957), The Alley Cat (1941), Rabbit of Seville (1950), Really Scent (1959)
884	21	"A Love Cruise"	February 11, 2025
Bill and Toony set sail on a couples cruise. Featured cartoons: Springtime for Thomas (1946), Of Rice and Hen (1953), Plumber of Seville (1957), Bride and Gloom (1954), Captain Hareblower (1954)
885	22	"Fairy Godmother of Dating to the Rescue"	February 12, 2025
Dating expert, Bela Gandhi, helps Toony with his love life. Featured cartoons: Rabbit Romeo (1957), Touché and Go (1957), Shakespearian Spinach (1940), The Bungling Builder (1971), Love Me, Love My Mouse (1966)
886	23	"Love Through the Ages"	February 13, 2025
Bill and Toony discuss the evolution of dating. Featured cartoons: Real Gone Woody (1954), Hello How Am I (1939), His Bitter Half (1950), Who Scent You? (1960), Tom and Chérie (1955)
887	24	"I'm with Toopid"	February 14, 2025
Toony becomes Toopid, the Red Tuna of Love, for Valentine's Day. Featured cartoons: Hare Splitter (1948), Don't Look Now (1936), Little Beau Pepé (1952), Bear and the Bees (1961), The Stupid Cupid (1944)
888	25	"Culinary Pioneers in Black History"	February 17, 2025
Bill and Toony honor some of America's greatest African American culinary pioneers. Featured cartoons: Hook, Line and Stinker (1958), Now That Summer Is Gone (1938), Who's Cookin' Who? (1946), Porky's Cafe (1942), Gopher Broke (1958)
889	26	"An Archeological Dig"	February 18, 2025
Bill and Toony volunteer to help out at an archeological dig site. Featured cartoons: The Wacky Wabbit (1942), Practical Yolk (1966), Matinee Idol Popeye (1960), Case of the Red-Eyed Ruby (1961), Kitty Foiled (1948)
890	27	"Bill's Book of Fables"	February 19, 2025
Bill writes a book to teach Toony a lesson about morals. Featured cartoons: Rabbit Transit (1947), Grape Nutty (1949), Bell Hoppy (1954), Little Rural Riding Hood (1949), The Mouse and the Lion (1953)
891	28	"Cabin Fever"	February 20, 2025
Bill and Toony cope with "cabin fever". Featured cartoons: Birth of a Notion (1947), Chilly and the Looney Gooney (1969), Davey Cricket (1965), Cannery Rodent (1967), Sandy Claws (1955)
892	29	"Toony and Bill Dial-up 1995"	February 21, 2025
Bill takes Toony on a virtual reality tour of 1995 pop culture. Featured cartoons: Beanstalk Bunny (1955), The Bird Who Came to Dinner (1961), The Mouse from H.U.N.G.E.R. (1967), Zip Zip Hooray (1965), Tree Cornered Tweety (1956)
893	30	"This Week in History #1"	February 25, 2025
Bill and Toony host a brand new edition of "This Week in History". Featured cartoons: Bugs Bunny and the Three Bears (1944), Putty Tat Trouble (1951), Born to Peck (1952), Bartholomew Versus the Wheel (1964), Conrad the Sailor (1942)
894	31	"Celebrating Tex"	February 26, 2025
Bill and Toony celebrate the life and cartoons of pioneering animator Tex Avery. Featured cartoons: A Wild Hare (1940), Red Hot Riding Hood (1943), Northwest Hounded Police (1946), Symphony in Slang (1951), The Legend of Rockabye Point (1955)
895	32	"Throwback Thursday: 1969"	February 27, 2025
Bill and Toony throw it back to the year 1969. Featured cartoons: The Music Mice-Tro (1967), Phoney Pony (1969), Charlie's Campout (1969), Bugged by a Bee (1969), Haredevil Hare (1948)
896	33	"Black History - Comics & Toys"	February 28, 2025
Bill and Toony celebrate the impact of African Americans on the comic book and toy industries with the help of an iconic comic strip creator. Featured cartoons: The Redwood Sap (1951), Swallow the Leader (1949), Stupor Duck (1956), Past Perfumance (1955), Fast and Furry-ous (1949)
897	34	"Safari Bill"	March 3, 2025
Bill and Toony go on an African safari. Featured cartoons: Sorry Safari (1962), The Lyin' Mouse (1937), Safari So Good (1947), Road Runner a Go-Go (1965), Aqua Duck (1963)
898	35	"Fat Tuesday"	March 4, 2025
Bill and Toony explore the unique ways Fat Tuesday is celebrated worldwide and whip up some delicious Polish treats with a master chef. Featured cartoons: Hare Ribbin' (1944), Calling All Cuckoos (1956), Hunger Strife (1960), The Dog House (1952), My Favorite Duck (1942)
899	36	"Soap Box Heroes"	March 5, 2025
Bill introduces the world of soap box racing to Toony. From carving to cruising, they are in for a ride. Featured cartoons: Catch as Cats Can (1947), Go Away Stowaway (1967), Double-Cross-Country Race (1951), There Auto Be a Law (1953), Slicked-up Pup (1951)
900	37	"Fun Raising"	March 6, 2025
Bill and Toony get creative to raise money for a one-of-a-kind item. Featured cartoons: Daffy Dilly (1948), A Fine Feathered Frenzy (1954), The Blow Out (1936), The Talking Dog (1956), Bonanza Bunny (1959)
901	38	"The North Star State"	March 10, 2025
Bill and Toony continue their "Trekkin' All 50" tour of the United States with a visit to Minnesota. Featured cartoons: Hare Conditioned (1945), We Aim to Please (1934), Robin Hoody Woody (1963), A Street Cat Named Sylvester (1953), Teeny Weeny Meany (1966)
902	39	"Take a Hike"	March 11, 2025
Bill braves a treacherous hike with the illusory help of Toony. Featured cartoons: Boobs in the Woods (1950), Red Hot Rangers (1947), Lonesome Ranger (1966), I-Ski Love-Ski You-Ski (1936), Hillbilly Hare (1950)
903	40	"Rival of the Ages III"	March 12, 2025
Two generations face off in the third edition of "Rival of the Ages."; Featured cartoons: The Hare-Brained Hypnotist (1942), Feather Bluster (1958), Ozark Lark (1960), A Fox in a Fix (1951), Cat and Dupli-cat (1967)
904	41	"Art of the Con"	March 13, 2025
Bill and Toony look at some cons and con artists. Featured cartoons: Bedevilled Rabbit (1957), Flim Flam Fountain (1970), Patient Porky (1940), Bunco Busters (1955), Robin Hood Daffy (1958)
905	42	"The Luck o' the Irish"	March 17, 2025
Bill and Toony celebrate St. Patrick's Day. Featured cartoons: The Wearing of the Grin (1951), His Better Elf (1958), Droopy Leprechaun (1958), Shamrock and Roll (1969), My Bunny Lies over the Sea (1948)
906	43	"Oh My It's 75!"	March 18, 2025
Music, movies, and mayhem collide in this 1975 throwback as Bill and Toony experience everything from explosive sweets to gravity-defying adventures. Featured cartoons: Daffy Rents (1966), Puss 'n' Boats (1966), Hair-Raising Hare (1946), Tops in the Big Top (1945), Lickety-Splat (1961)
907	44	"The Gem State"	March 20, 2025
Bill and Toony are ready for adventure, scenic views, and a monstrous amount of potatoes as they continue their "Trekkin' All 50" tour of the United States to Idaho. Featured cartoons: Sleepy Time Possum (1951), His Hare-Raising Tale (1951), Out and Out Rout (1966), Chilly's Hide-A-Way (1971), Mucho Mouse (1957)
908	45	"On This Day... March 21st"	March 21, 2025
Bill and Toony look back on historic events that took place on March 21st. Featured cartoons: D' Fightin' Ones (1961), Porky's Naughty Nephew (1938), Convict Concerto (1954), What's Cookin' Doc? (1944), Clippety Clobbered (1966)
909	46	"Simply Sylvester"	March 24, 2025
Bill and Toony celebrate everyone's favorite black and white tuxedo cat, Sylvester. Featured cartoons: Life with Feathers (1945), Scaredy Cat (1948), Birds Anonymous (1957), Who's Kitten Who? (1952), Cats and Bruises (1965)
910	47	"Dance Fever"	March 25, 2025
Bill prepares for a very special audition. Featured cartoons: Yankee Doodle Daffy (1943), Billboard Frolics (1935), The Dance Contest (1934), A Great Big Bunch of You (1932), Show Biz Beagle (1972)
911	48	"2nd Annual Toonaween"	March 26, 2025
Bill and Toony celebrate Toon In with Me's second annual Toonaween. Featured cartoons: Bugsy and Mugsy (1957), Panhandle Scandal (1959), Tweet Zoo (1957), Chilly's Cold War (1970), Quiet Please! (1945)
912	49	"Throwback Thursday: 1991"	March 27, 2025
It's throwback Thursday and Bill and Toony are taking a look back at the year 1991. Featured cartoons: My Generation G...G... Gap (2004), Design for Leaving (1954), Hamateur Night (1939), Lunch with a Punch (1952), Lighter Than Hare (1960)
913	50	"On This Day...March 31st"	March 31, 2025
Bill and Toony look back on historic events on March 31st. Featured cartoons: Heaven Scent (1956), Quackodile Tears (1962), So Does an Automobile (1939), Count Me Out (1938), Daffy Doodles (1946)
914	51	"A Day of Foolery"	April 1, 2025
On this April Fool's Day, Bill's on a mission to prank his closest friends. Featured cartoons: Foxy by Proxy (1952), Mother Was a Rooster (1962), Happy-Go-Nutty (1944), Imagination (1943), Stage Hoax (1952)
915	52	"A Toy Voyage"	April 2, 2025
Bill and Toony explore the magical world of traveling toys. Featured cartoons: Thumb Fun (1952), Aviation Vacation (1941), Problem Pappy (1941), Cruise Cat (1952), Napoleon Bunny-Part (1956)
916	53	"Bringing Alive '55"	April 4, 2025
Bill finds himself dreaming of 1955... or was it 1855? Featured cartoons: This Is a Life? (1955), Crazy Mixed Up Pup (1955), Cellbound (1955), Field and Scream (1955), Tweety's Circus (1955)
917	54	"Bill the Conqueror"	April 8, 2025
Bill believes he's the King of England. Featured cartoons: Prince Violent (1961), Robin Hoodwinked (1948), Jittery Jester (1958), Heir Bear (1953), Knight-mare Hare (1955)
918	55	"Bill and Toony Make a Commercial"	April 9, 2025
Bill and Toony unleash their inner ad executives, crafting commercials that range from high-end luxury to catchy jingles. Featured cartoons: The Stupor Salesman (1948), Claws in the Lease (1963), Ballyhooey (1960), The Hot Air Salesman (1937), Operation: Rabbit (1952)
919	56	"Throwback Thursday: 1980"	April 10, 2025
Bill and Toony look back at the events and pop culture that defined the year 1980. Featured cartoons: Duck Dodgers and the Return of the 24½th Century (1980), Mice Follies (1954), Tin Can Concert (1961), Hold the Wire (1936), Drag-A-Long Droopy (1954)
920	57	"A Minor Misunderstanding"	April 11, 2025
Bill and Toony step into the courtroom. Featured cartoons: Big House Bunny (1950), Judge for a Day (1935), Secret Agent Woody Woodpecker (1967), Assault and Flattery (1956), High Steaks (1962)
921	58	"The Wacky World of Oddball Sports"	April 14, 2025
Bill and Toony compete in interesting sports. Featured cartoons: Neapolitan Mouse (1954), Greedy Gabby Gator (1963), Fish Tales (1936), The Ostrich Egg and I (1956), To Duck or Not to Duck (1943)
922	59	"After School Special"	April 15, 2025
In an effort to teach Toony the importance of kindness, Bill decides to create a classic after-school special. Featured cartoons: That's My Pup! (1953), Truant Student (1959), The Screwy Truant (1945), The Turn-Tale Wolf (1952), Yankee Doodle Bugs (1954)
923	60	"The Wolverine State"	April 16, 2025
Bill and Toony visit Michigan, the next state on their "Trekkin' All 50" tour of the United States. Featured cartoons: Swing Ding Amigo (1966), A Ham in a Role (1949), Be Kind to 'Aminals' (1935), Hold That Rock (1956), Lighthouse Mouse (1955)
924	61	"Bill Gets Drafted"	April 17, 2025
Toony takes an unconventional approach to helping Bill train for military duty. It later reveals that Bill was drafted... for Mr. Quizzer's MeTV pickleball game. Featured cartoons: The Rebel Without Claws (1961), The Draft Horse (1942), The Rookie Bear (1941), I'm in the Army Now (1936), Crockett-Doodle-Do (1960)
925	62	"Egg-cited for Easter"	April 18, 2025
Bill and Toony prepare for Easter. Featured cartoons: Easter Yeggs (1947), The Chocolate Chase (1980), The Egg Cracker Suite (1943), Goose is Wild (1963), Happy Go Ducky (1958)
926	63	"All That Dancin'"	April 21, 2025
Bill and Toony kick off Toon In with Me's Wild West Week with country-western dancing. Featured cartoons: Texas Tom (1950), Musical Mountaineers (1939), Bugs Bunny Rides Again (1948), Swing Your Partner (1943), Down Beat Bear (1956)
927	64	"Best Westerns"	April 22, 2025
Cowboy Bill shows Toony the ropes when it comes to classic TV Westerns. Featured cartoons: Wild and Woolly Hare (1959), Woodpecker Wanted (1965), The First Bad Man (1955), Posse Cat (1954), Drip-Along Daffy (1951)
928	65	"A Rootin' Tootin' Good Time"	April 23, 2025
Bill and Toony throw a barn party. Featured cartoons: An Egg Scramble (1950), The Woody Woodpecker Polka (1951), Stop That Noise (1935), The EGGcited Rooster (1952), Fowl Weather (1953)
929	66	"Country Flicks"	April 24, 2025
Bill and Toony make their own classic Western film. Featured cartoons: My Little Duckaroo (1954), Rough and Tumbleweed (1961), The Hole Idea (1955), Whoops! I'm a Cowboy (1937), Tall in the Trap (1962)
930	67	"Rhinestone Cow-Bill"	April 25, 2025
Bill and Toony look back at the golden era of country music, the Seventies. Featured cartoons: Jumpin' Jupiter (1955), Deputy Droopy (1955), Pistol Packin' Woodpecker (1960), Pecos Pest (1955), The Bashful Buzzard (1945)
931	68	"The Green Mountain State"	April 29, 2025
Bill and Toony tour the great state of Vermont, from farm to table. Featured cartoons: Hare Do (1949), The Cats Bah (1954), Solid Ivory (1947), Cock-a-Doodle Dog (1951), Plop Goes the Weasel (1953)
932	69	"Everything Old is New Again"	April 30, 2025
Bill and Toony explore old trends that are back in style. Featured cartoons: A Bird in a Guilty Cage (1952), The Unmentionables (1963), Superior Duck (1996), Juke Box Jamboree (1942), Carrotblanca (1995)
933	70	"Secret Agent Bill"	May 1, 2025
Teddy Roosevelt enlists Bill as a spy. Bill looks to Sixties spies for inspiration. Featured cartoons: The Counterfeit Cat (1949), Corn on the Cop (1965), Phoney Express (1962), Blunder Below (1942), Baby Buggy Bunny (1954)
934	71	"World Tuna Day"	May 2, 2025
It's World Tuna Day, and Toony is going all out to celebrate his special day. Featured cartoons: Filet Meow (1966), Porky's Five & Ten (1938), Fresh Fish (1939), Fin'n Catty (1943), Canned Feud (1951)
935	72	"Celebrating Yosemite Sam"	May 5, 2025
Bill and Toony celebrate the career of Looney Tunes' roughest, toughest outlaw, Yosemite Sam. Featured cartoons: Hare Trigger (1945), Buccaneer Bunny (1948), Sahara Hare (1955), Honey's Money (1962), Knighty Knight Bugs (1958)
936	73	"Palm Springs Paradise"	May 7, 2025
Toony and Bill visit the retro resorts and other sites of the Coachella Valley. Featured cartoons: Guided Muscle (1955), Strife with Father (1950), Vacation with Play (1951), Half Empty Saddles (1958), Road to Andalay (1964)
937	74	"A Royal Affair"	May 8, 2025
Bill and Toony prepare to attend a royal ball. Featured cartoons: From Hare to Heir (1960), Woody's Knight Mare (1969), Fast Buck Duck (1963), Swing Shift Cinderella (1945), Ancient Fistory (1953)
938	75	"Never Has Bill Ever"	May 9, 2025
Toony learns that Bill has never had coffee and encourages him to try it with help from some of their friends. Featured cartoons: Rabbit's Kin (1952), Duck Dodgers in Attack of the Drones (2004), The Daffy Doc (1938), Coo Coo Nuts (1970), That's My Mommy (1955)
939	76	"The Originators"	May 12, 2025
Bill and Toony explore the origins of popular phrases, movies, products, and more. Featured cartoons: Elmer's Candid Camera (1940), Leave Well Enough Alone (1939), A Tale of Two Kitties (1942), Woody Woodpecker (1941), Cat-Tails for Two (1953)
940	77	"Strange But True..."	May 13, 2025
Bill and Toony discuss strange facts that are surprisingly true. Featured cartoons: Well Worn Daffy (1965), Chariots of Fur (1994), A Day at the Zoo (1939), Betty Boop's Rise to Fame (1934), Knights Must Fall (1949)
941	78	"Trekkin' the Sunflower State"	May 14, 2025
Bill and Toony explore the state of Kansas on their "Trekkin' All 50" tour of the United States. Featured cartoons: Hoppy Daze (1961), Saddle-Sore Woody (1964), Porky's Pet (1936), A Rainy Day (1940), Hot-Rod and Reel! (1959)
942	79	"Stuntman Bill"	May 15, 2025
Toony tries turning Bill into a stuntman. Featured cartoons: Big Top Bunny (1951), Daredevil Droopy (1951), I Wanna Be a Life Guard (1936), A Waggily Tale (1958), A Star Is Bored (1956)
943	80	"Flashback to 2005"	May 16, 2025
Bill and Toony throw it back to the year 2005. Featured cartoons: Hare Brush (1955), Merlin the Magic Mouse (1967), Snow Place Like Home (1948), The Tenant's Racket (1963), Cock-a-Doodle Duel (2004)
944	81	"Bill and Toony Buy a Castle"	May 19, 2025
Bill and Toony buy a historic Irish castle. Featured cartoons: Water, Water Every Hare (1952), One Droopy Knight (1957), The Queen Was in the Parlor (1932), Robin Hoodwinked (1958), Tweety and the Beanstalk (1957)
945	82	"Pop Life"	May 20, 2025
Bill and Toony take a tour through pop music history. Featured cartoons: Back Alley Oproar (1948), Bingo Crosbyana (1936), A Language All My Own (1935), A Hare Grows in Manhattan (1947), Banty Raids (1963)
946	83	"A Page From the Digest"	May 22, 2025
Bill and Toony look back at parenting trends of the past. Featured cartoons: Apes of Wrath (1959), Bedtime Bedlam (1955), Stork Naked (1955), Baby Wants a Battle (1953), Too Hop to Handle (1956)
947	84	"What? It's '45!"	May 23, 2025
Bill and Toony take a look back at the year 1945. Featured cartoons: The Unruly Hare (1945), Peck Up Your Troubles (1945), Crow Crazy (1945), Wild and Woolfy (1945), Flirty Birdy (1945)
948	85	"Captain Steamboat"	May 27, 2025
Bill and Toony hop aboard a paddle wheel steamboat and take a trip down the Mississippi River. Featured cartoons: Captain Hareblower (1954), A Fractured Leghorn (1950), Mississippi Slow Boat (1961), Good Noose (1962), Chilly Willy (1953)
949	86	"Cartoon Mascots"	May 28, 2025
Toony prepares for a very special audition. Featured cartoons: The Music Mice-Tro (1967), Tweet Tweet Tweety (1951), Duck! Rabbit, Duck! (1953), Wee-Willie Wildcat (1953), Backwoods Bunny (1959)
950	87	"Animation IRL"	May 29, 2025
Cartoons come to life in the real world with special guests Rob Paulsen and Randy Rogel of the Animaniacs. Featured cartoons: Book Revue (1946), Designs on Jerry (1955), You Ought to Be in Pictures (1940), Prince Violent (1961), Zip 'N Snort (1961)
951	88	"New Wave Bill"	May 30, 2025
Bill reminisces about his days in a band during the early '80s. Featured cartoons: The Yolk's on You (1980), Pent-House Mouse (1963), Her Honor the Mare (1943), Get Lost (1956), The Three Little Pups (1953)
952	89	"Coffin Racing"	June 2, 2025
Bill and Toony's Juneaween celebration begins with a coffin race. Featured cartoons: Transylvania 6-5000 (1963), Ghosks Is the Bunk (1939), Hyde and Sneak (1962), The Flying Sorceress (1956), Dr. Jerkyl's Hide (1954)
953	90	"Campfire Stories"	June 3, 2025
Bill and Toony gather by the campfire for spooky stories and camping traditions. Featured cartoons: It's an Ill Wind (1939), Big Game Haunt (1968), Fright to the Finish (1954), Hound Hunters (1947), Broom-Stick Bunny (1956)
954	91	"Gangbusters"	June 4, 2025
Continuing their Juneaween adventure, Bill and Toony tour Dillinger's alley, sit in Capone's favorite booth, and disappear into Chicago's hidden tunnels. Featured cartoons: The Great Piggy Bank Robbery (1946), More Pep (1936), Racketeer Rabbit (1946), All Hams on Deck (1970), Catty Cornered (1953)
955	92	"We're Having a Party"	June 5, 2025
Bill and Toony help Mr. Quizzer plan a Juneaween Bash. Featured cartoons: Bewitched Bunny (1954), Is My Palm Read (1933), Fowled Up Party (1957), Spooky Swabs (1957), Hyde and Hare (1955)
956	93	"Juneaween Bash"	June 6, 2025
Mr. Quizzer throws a Juneaween pool party. Featured cartoons: Box-Office Bunny (1991), Trick or Tweet (1959), Monster of Ceremonies (1966), Midnight Frolics (1938), Witch Crafty (1955)
957	94	"Trekkin' the Bay State"	June 10, 2025
Bill and Toony explore Massachusetts. Featured cartoons: Hare We Go (1951), Bunker Hill Bunny (1950), Dopey Dick the Pink Whale (1957), Lunch with a Punch (1952), Greedy for Tweety (1957)
958	95	"The Lost Land"	June 12, 2025
Bill and Toony explore ancient ruins and lost cities. Featured cartoons: Pre-Hysterical Hare (1958), It's Greek to Me-ow! (1961), Lighthouse Keeping Blues (1964), Roamin' Roman (1964), Duck Dodgers in the 24½th Century (1953)
959	96	"On This Day... June 17th"	June 17, 2025
Bill and Toony look back on historic events that took place on June 17th. Featured cartoons: No Parking Hare (1954), The Sneezing Weasel (1938), What's Sweepin' (1953), Fish Fry (1944), The Cat Concerto (1947)
960	97	"Movies to Animation"	June 18, 2025
From the big screen to the small screen, movies that became animated series. Featured cartoons: Baton Bunny (1959), The Film Fan (1939), The Big Birdcast (1938), A Balmy Swami (1949), Daffy Duck in Hollywood (1938)
961	98	"Summer Break"	June 19, 2025
Bill and Toony plan a vacation in summer. Featured cartoons: Trip for Tat (1960), Chaser on the Rocks (1965), Down and Outing (1961), Charlie's Campout (1969), Rabbitson Crusoe (1956)
962	99	"Bill Makes a Film Noir"	June 23, 2025
Bill stars as a private eye in "The Malty Fountain". Is Toony the "fish fatale", or just a red herring? Featured cartoons: Boston Quackie (1957), Scent-imental Over You (1947), Grin and Share It (1957), Socko in Morocco (1954), Slick Hare (1947)
963	100	"Trekkin' Thru the Mountain State"	June 25, 2025
Bill and Toony visit wild and wonderful West Virginia for a little whitewater rafting. Featured cartoons: All a Bir-r-r-d (1950), Mountain Ears (1939), Woody Meets Davy Crewcut (1956), Wild Elephinks (1933), Duck Soup to Nuts (1944)
964	101	"Rival of the Ages IV"	June 27, 2025
Two generations face off in the fourth edition of Rival of the Ages. Featured cartoons: Cat Napping (1951), Hot Rod Huckster (1954), A Hull of a Mess (1942), Zoom and Bored (1957), Rabbit Every Monday (1951)
965	102	"Waterpark It!"	July 1, 2025
Bill and Toony visit a water park; Bill gets stuck in the past...and stuck in a slide. Featured cartoons: Nasty Quacks (1945), A Little Soap and Water (1935), South Pole Pals (1966), Wacky Wild Life (1940), Frigid Hare (1949)
966	103	"Too Close Encounters"	July 2, 2025
It's World UFO Day, and Toony is convinced that Bill was abducted by aliens. Featured cartoons: Ain't She Tweet (1952), Woodpecker From Mars (1956), Popeye, the Ace of Space (1953), Martian Through Georgia (1962), Mad as a Mars Hare (1963)
967	104	"Throwback Thursday: 1972"	July 3, 2025
Bill and Toony revisit the year 1972. Featured cartoons: Don't Axe Me (1958), Customers Wanted (1939), Bye, Bye, Blackboard (1972), (Blooper) Bunny (1991), Shanghai Woody (1971)
968	105	"Treehouse Adventure"	July 7, 2025
Bill and Toony build the treehouse of their dreams. Featured cartoons: Porky Chops (1949), Safari So Good (1947), Wackiki Wabbit (1943), The Tree Medic (1955), Lumber Jerks (1955)
969	106	"To Be a Kid Again"	July 8, 2025
Bill spends the day like a kid. Featured cartoons: Portrait of the Artist as a Young Bunny (1980), I Wanna Play House (1936), The Bird Who Came to Dinner (1961), Nurse to Meet Ya (1955), Guided Mouse-ille (1967)
970	107	"An Amazing Hoax"	July 11, 2025
Toony tricks Bill into believing that the sky is falling. Featured cartoons: Hopalong Casualty (1960), Bad Luck Blackie (1949), The Dog That Cried Wolf (1953), Bathing Buddies (1946), Southbound Duckling (1955)
971	108	"Trekkin' the Bayou"	July 15, 2025
Bill and Toony visit Louisiana on the next stop of Toon In with Me's "Trekkin' All 50" tour of the United States. Featured cartoons: Ballot Box Bunny (1951), The Organ Grinder (1933), Really Scent (1959), What's My Lion? (1961), Romp in a Swamp (1959)
972	109	"That's a Racket"	July 16, 2025
Bill and Toony break down racket sports. Featured cartoons: Bunny Hugged (1951), Bad Ol' Putty Tat (1949), Design for Leaving (1954), The Chump Champ (1950), The Wild Chase (1965)
973	110	"Return to Camp Watchingtoon"	July 18, 2025
Bill goes scouting, trying to earn more patches for his sash. Featured cartoons: Home Tweet Home (1950), Cheese Chasers (1951), The Eager Beaver (1946), Slingshot 6 7/8 (1951), One Meat Brawl (1947)
974	111	"Southern Trek"	July 21, 2025
Bill and Toony celebrate the Christmas in July traditions of the Southern Hemisphere and meet South Pole Santa. Featured cartoons: Hop, Look and Listen (1948), Ducking the Devil (1957), Hot Time on Ice (1967), We're on Our Way to Rio (1944), Bushy Hare (1950)
975	112	"Santa Cruise"	July 22, 2025
Bill and Toony enjoy some fun in the sun aboard a Santa Cruise. Featured cartoons: Ski for Two (1944), Go Away Stowaway (1967), Mister and Mistletoe (1955), Surf-Bored Cat (1967), Sandy Claws (1955)
976	113	"The Elves and the Flip-Flop Maker"	July 23, 2025
The classic tale of The Elves and the Shoemaker is given a summer Toony twist. Featured cartoons: Good Night Elmer (1940), Yankee Dood It (1956), Busy Bakers (1940), Sleepy Time Bear (1969), The Peachy Cobbler (1950)
977	114	"Oh What a Chocolatey Surprise!"	July 24, 2025
Toony has a sweet surprise for Bill to celebrate Jolly July. Featured cartoons: 8 Ball Bunny (1950), Holiday for Shoestrings (1946), Happy You and Merry Me (1936), Robinson Gruesome (1959), Jerry's Diary (1949)
978	115	"Joyful Jolly July"	July 25, 2025
Bill and Toony celebrate Jolly July. Featured cartoons: Gift Wrapped (1952), Scrappy Birthday (1949), Bats in the Belfry (1960), A Gander at Mother Goose (1940), Bedtime for Sniffles (1940)
979	116	"Air Guitar Bill"	July 28, 2025
Bill enters an air guitar competition. Featured cartoons: The Flying Cat (1952), Three Little Bops (1957), The Painter and the Pointer (1944), Bugged by a Bee (1969), My Generation G... G... Gap (2004)
980	117	"Trekkin' the Land of Enchantment"	July 30, 2025
Bill and Toony visit New Mexico on the next stop of Toon In with Me's "Trekkin' All 50" tour of the United States. Featured cartoons: Bully for Bugs (1953), The Big Snooze (1957), Jumpin' Jupiter (1955), Hip Hip-Hurry! (1958), Ali Baba Bunny (1957)
981	118	"Bill, P.I."	August 1, 2025
Bill trains to be a private detective, with a little help from TV history and a real-life private eye. Featured cartoons: Deduce, You Say! (1956), The Sheepish Wolf (1942), Skinfolks (1964), The Mouse on 57th Street (1961), Satan's Waitin' (1954)
982	119	"Trekkin' Big Sky Country"	August 5, 2025
Bill and Toony trek Montana. Featured cartoons: Wet Hare (1962), Boobs in the Woods (1950), Tease for Two (1965), The Dixie Fryer (1960), Fish Hooked (1960)
983	120	"Forgotten Inventions"	August 7, 2025
Bill and Toony discuss long-lost and forgotten inventions like Roman concrete and the Antikythera mechanism. Featured cartoons: Compressed Hare (1961), Grampy's Indoor Outing (1936), The Hole Idea (1955), The Farm of Tomorrow (1954), Birth of a Notion (1947)
984	121	"Gut Instinct"	August 11, 2025
Bill helps Toony with his gut health. Featured cartoons: Rabbit's Feat (1960), Patient Porky (1940), Birds Anonymous (1957), Andy Panda's Victory Garden (1942), Yankee Doodle Daffy (1943)
985	122	"On This Day...August 12th"	August 12, 2025
Bill and Toony look back at some of the biggest stories that happened on August 12th. Featured cartoons: Hillbilly Hare (1950), Beep Prepared (1961), Katnip Kollege (1938), Tar with a Star (1949), Barbecue Brawl (1956)
986	123	"Yellow Belly Chickens"	August 15, 2025
Bill rejoins his pee-wee baseball league to settle some old scores. Featured cartoons: Baseball Bugs (1946), Batty Baseball (1944), Fit to Be Tied (1952), Gone Batty (1954), The Screwball (1943)
987	124	"This Old Car"	August 19, 2025
Bill fixes up an antique automobile and takes Toony to a classic car show. Featured cartoons: Zipping Along (1953), The Spinach Roadster (1936), Car of Tomorrow (1951), Streamlined Greta Green (1937), The Windblown Hare (1949)
988	125	"Trekkin' the Free State"	August 20, 2025
Bill and Toony visit Maryland on the next stop of Toon In with Me's "Trekkin' All 50" tour of the United States. Featured cartoons: Tortoise Beats Hare (1941), Hi-Seas Hi-Jacker (1963), Onion Pacific (1940), The Little Wise Quacker (1952), Puss 'n' Boats (1966)
989	126	"Forever Young"	August 21, 2025
Bill discovers the wonders of anti-aging. Featured cartoons: A Bird in a Bonnet (1958), Nurse-Mates (1940), A Broken Leghorn (1959), Flim Flam Fountain (1970), Big House Bunny (1950)
990	127	"Such Great Heists"	August 22, 2025
When Bill needs to pull off a toy heist, he revisits the biggest heists in U.S. history. Featured cartoons: Bugs and Thugs (1954), Sissy Sheriff (1967), Stealin' Ain't Honest (1940), Caballero Droopy (1952), Devil's Feud Cake (1963)
991	128	"Snacks n' Relax"	August 25, 2025
Bill and Toony kick back and relax watching five Toon In with Me cartoon debuts. Featured cartoons: An Itch in Time (1943), All's Fair at the Fair (1947), The Lady in Red (1935), Baby Be Good (1935), Musical Moments from Chopin (1947)
992	129	"Hillbilly Hijinks"	August 27, 2025
Bill competes in Benny the I-T Feller's Hillbilly Hijinks, an unorthodox sporting competition with events like 'Toilet Seat Toss' and 'Armpit Serenade'. Featured cartoons: Backwoods Bunny (1959), Double or Mutton (1955), Let Charlie Do It (1972), Solid Serenade (1946), Leghorn Swoggled (1951)
993	130	"Chewing Thru Guam"	August 28, 2025
Toony and Bill tour the U.S. territory of Guam, from its waterfalls to its foods. Featured cartoons: Hawaiian Aye Aye (1964), Beaus Will Be Beaus (1955), Fastest with the Mostest (1960), Muscle Beach Tom (1956), The Heckling Hare (1941)
994	131	"Happy Birthday, Speedy!"	August 29, 2025
Bill and Toony celebrate the debut of Speedy Gonzales. Featured cartoons: Cat-Tails for Two (1953), Speedy Gonzales (1955), Mexican Cat Dance (1963), It's Nice to Have a Mouse Around the House (1965), Snow Excuse (1966), See Ya Later Gladiator (1968)
995	132	"Trekkin' the Bluegrass State"	September 2, 2025
Bill and Toony trek through Kentucky. Featured cartoons: 14 Carrot Rabbit (1952), Musical Mountaineers (1939), The Woody Woodpecker Polka (1951), The Snoozin' Bruin (1971), Purr-Chance to Dream (1967)
996	133	"Caveman Days"	September 3, 2025
Bill and Toony travel back in time to the days of the caveman. Featured cartoons: Daffy Duck and the Dinosaur (1939), Pre-Hysterical Man (1948), Wild Wild World (1960), Prehistoric Porky (1940), Prehistoric Super Salesman (1969)
997	134	"1000th Episode"	September 4, 2025
It's Toon In with Me's 1,000th episode. Quizzer takes Bill on a stroll down memory lane. Plus, five cartoon premieres. Featured cartoons: Hiss and Make Up (1943), Boyhood Daze (1957), House Tricks? (1946), Polar Pests (1958), Two Little Indians (1953)
998	135	"Tiny Trends"	September 5, 2025
Bill and Toony explore tiny trends. Featured cartoons: Show Biz Bugs (1957), Half-Pint Palomino (1953), The Happy Tots' Expedition (1940), Tweet Dreams (1959), The Cat's Me-Ouch (1965)
999	136	"Septembers of Our Past"	September 8, 2025
Bill and Toony reflect on nostalgic memories of the transitional month. Featured cartoons: What's Up, Doc? (1950), Just Ducky (1953), Jitterbug Jive (1950), Now That Summer Is Gone (1938), Lovelorn Leghorn (1951)
1000	137	"The Great Quizby"	September 9, 2025
When Mr. Quizzer strikes it rich, he throws a 1925-themed party like The Great Gatsby. Featured cartoons: Heir-Conditioned (1955), Wags to Riches (1949), Dough Ray Me-ow (1948), Banquet Busters (1948), Ready, Woolen and Able (1960)
1001	138	"Reunited...So Good!"	September 10, 2025
Bill prepares for his high school reunion. Featured cartoons: Upswept Hare (1953), Eatin' on the Cuff or The Moth Who Came to Dinner (1942), Rock 'n' Rodent (1967), Poop Deck Pirate (1961), Raw! Raw! Rooster! (1956)
1002	139	"Throwback Thursday: 2002"	September 11, 2025
Bill and Toony reminisce on the year 2002. Featured cartoons: Canary Row (1950), Service with a Guile (1946), The Dippy Diplomat (1945), From Hare to Eternity (1997), Feed the Kitty (1952)
1003	140	"Go, Fight, Win!"	September 12, 2025
Bill enters the dynamic world of cheerleading. Featured cartoons: The Unexpected Pest (1956), Foot Brawl (1966), High Steaks (1962), Little Televillain (1958), Big Top Bunny (1951)
1004	141	"Mystery Quest"	September 15, 2025
Bill and Toony are on a quest to solve some of history's greatest mysteries. Featured cartoons: Captain Hareblower (1954), Heaven Scent (1956), Spaced Out Bunny (1980), Lonesome Lenny (1946), The Missing Mouse (1953)
1005	142	"Secret Age Man"	September 16, 2025
Bill and Toony's new podcast sets out to finally uncover the truth about Mr. Quizzer's real age. Featured cartoons: Road Runner a Go-Go (1965), The Loan Stranger (1942), Wimmin Is a Myskery (1940), The Bodyguard (1944), The Old Grey Hare (1944)
1006	143	"Mysterious Locations"	September 17, 2025
Bill and Toony visit some of the most mysterious places on earth. Featured cartoons: One Froggy Evening (1955), The Vanishing Duck (1958), Practical Yolk (1966), Females Is Fickle (1940), Dough for the Do-Do (1949)
1007	144	"Mystery Flavors"	September 18, 2025
From hidden ingredients to bizarre blends, Bill and Toony uncover the mysteries behind popular flavors. Featured cartoons: What Makes Daffy Duck (1948), Mouse in the House (1967), Hypnotic Hick (1953), Puttin' on the Dog (1944), A Corny Concerto (1943)
1008	145	"Masquerade Ball"	September 19, 2025
Bill and Toony receive a mysterious invitation. Featured cartoons: Cats and Bruises (1965), Robin Hood Daffy (1958), Phoney Pony (1969), Hello How Am I (1939), Elmer's Pet Rabbit (1941)
1009	146	"Fall Equinox"	September 22, 2025
Bill and Toony celebrate the autumn equinox with traditions from around the world. Featured cartoons: Chili Corn Corny (1965), The Year of the Mouse (1965), Goofy Gophers (1947), The Milky Way (1940), Paying the Piper (1949)
1010	147	"Don't Believe Your Brain!"	September 23, 2025
Prepare to have your mind blown, as Bill reveals common shared false memories involving cartoons. Featured cartoons: Hare Tonic (1945), The House of Tomorrow (1949), Charlie in Hot Water (1970), The Trial of Mr. Wolf (1941), Of Feline Bondage (1965)
1011	148	"Trekkin' the First State"	September 25, 2025
Bill and Toony visit the state of Delaware on their "Trekkin' All 50" tour of the United States. Featured cartoons: Sleep Happy (1951), Hippydrome Tiger (1968), The Dover Boys (1942), Eggnapper (1961), False Hare (1964)
1012	149	"Bill Buys the Farm"	September 26, 2025
Bill discovers the joy of rural living when he purchases a farm. Featured cartoons: The High and the Flighty (1956), Porky the Rain-Maker (1936), The Farmer and the Belle (1950), Farm Frolics (1941), Robot Rabbit (1953)
1013	150	"Forgotten Fads"	September 29, 2025
Bill gives Toony a lesson in forgotten fads. Featured cartoons: Along Came Daffy (1947), Bugs' Bonnets (1956), Lonesome Ranger (1966), Down Beat Bear (1956), Hare Do (1949)
1014	151	"Catch the Connection"	September 30, 2025
Bill and Toony solve a cartoon mystery as part of Mr. Quizzer's newest game show "Catch the Connection!"; Featured cartoons: The Hasty Hare (1952), A Sheep in the Deep (1962), Puss n' Booty (1943), It's Hummer Time (1950), Baby Bottleneck (1946)
1015	152	"Weird Fall Fests"	October 1, 2025
Bill and Toony visit true American festivals dedicated to fire ants, werewolves, wooly worms and more. Featured cartoons: Steal Wool (1957), Mouse Wreckers (1949), The Squawkin' Hawk (1942), Log Jammed (1959), The Invisible Mouse (1947)
1016	153	"Throwback Thursday: 1982"	October 2, 2025
Bill and Toony reminisce on the year 1982. Featured cartoons: Go Go Amigo (1965), French Rarebit (1951), Roof Top Razzle-Dazzle (1964), Gym Jam (1950), Feather Dusted (1955)
1017	154	"Trekkin' the Hawkeye State"	October 3, 2025
Bill and Toony explore Iowa. Featured cartoons: Rodent to Stardom (1967), Slap-Happy Pappy (1940), Louvre Come Back to Me! (1962), Boston Beanie (1947), Hurdy-Gurdy Hare (1950)
1018	155	"Desperately Seeking Simon"	October 8, 2025
When Bill fills in for Simon Shock, his deejay skills reshape the radio show. Featured cartoons: Scent-imental Romeo (1951), Zoom at the Top (1962), Pitchin' Woo at the Zoo (1944), Chiller Dillers (1968), The Cat Above and the Mouse Below (1964)
1019	156	"Fall Rush"	October 9, 2025
Bill and Toony rush Cleamma. Featured cartoons: Little Runaway (1952), Scat Cats (1957), Bell Hoppy (1954), The Reluctant Recruit (1971), Bugs Bunny Rides Again (1948)
1020	157	"Trekkin' the Magnolia State"	October 10, 2025
Bill and Toony visit the state of Mississippi on their "Trekkin' All 50" tour of the United States. Featured cartoons: Apes of Wrath (1959), Aviation Vacation (1941), Room and Bird (1951), Mississippi Slow Boat (1961), Duck Dodgers and the Return of the 24½th Century (1980)
1021	158	"Trekkin' the Roughrider State"	October 14, 2025
Bill and Toony visit North Dakota on the next stop of Toon In with Me's "Trekkin' All 50" tour of the United States. Featured cartoons: The Fair-Haired Hare (1951), Pests for Guests (1955), The First Bad Man (1955), Puny Express (1951), Homesteader Droopy (1954)
1022	159	"Hitting Pause On Adulting"	October 15, 2025
Bill and Toony take a break from the stresses of adulting for the day. Featured cartoons: Rabbit's Kin (1952), Quiet Please! (1945), Porky's Poppa (1938), Out to Punch (1956), Feather Bluster (1958)
1023	160	"Old October"	October 16, 2025
Bill and Toony reminisce on Octobers of the past. Featured cartoons: Rabbit Seasoning (1952), The Football Toucher Downer (1937), A Fine Feathered Frenzy (1954), Hollywood Capers (1935), Pop 'im Pop! (1950)
1024	161	"Roller Coasting Along"	October 17, 2025
Bill and Toony learn about roller coaster design from a real-life roller coaster engineer. Featured cartoons: Fast and Furry-ous (1949), The Great Who-Dood-It (1952), Curious Puppy (1939), Abusement Park (1947), Curtain Razor (1949)
1025	162	"Chilling Traditions"	October 20, 2025
Toon In with Me's Boo-Bash begins with a look back on some seriously spooky traditions. Featured cartoons: Hyde and Go Tweet (1960), The Haunted Mouse (1941), Wild Bill Hiccup (1970), I Don't Scare (1956), Broom-Stick Bunny (1956)
1026	163	"Tales of Poe"	October 21, 2025
Toony and Bill retell classic horror tales of Edgar Allan Poe. Featured cartoons: The Hypo-Chondri-Cat (1950), The Cuckoo Clock (1950), Claws for Alarm (1954), Crowin' Pains (1962), A Witch's Tangled Hare (1959)
1027	164	"Toon In With Me's Horror Show"	October 22, 2025
Bill and Toony make their own classic horror film with special guests Svengoolie and the Sven Squad. Featured cartoons: The Duxorcist (1987), The Scared Crows (1939), Purr-Chance to Dream (1967), Ghosks Is the Bunk (1939), Under the Counter Spy (1954)
1028	165	"Halloween Monsters"	October 23, 2025
Toony and Bill turn into classic monsters. Featured cartoons: Hair-Raising Hare (1946), Timid Tabby (1957), Shiver Me Timbers! (1934), Franken-Stymied (1961), Dr. Jerkyl's Hide (1954)
1029	166	"Do You Want to Play with Me?"	October 24, 2025
Bill and Toony discuss clowns and dolls. Featured cartoons: The Abominable Snow Rabbit (1961), Midnight Frolics (1938), Devil's Feud Cake (1963), Fright to the Finish (1954), Jumpin' Jupiter (1955)
1030	167	"Headless Horseman"	October 27, 2025
Washington Irving's classic tales is retold with a Toony twist. Featured cartoons: Water, Water Every Hare (1952), The Flying Sorceress (1956), Popeye Meets Rip Van Winkle (1941), Phantom of the Horse Opera (1961), A-Haunting We Will Go (1966)
1031	168	"Scariest Places on Earth"	October 28, 2025
Bill and Toony visit a few of the world's scariest places. Featured cartoons: Scaredy Cat (1948), The Phantom Ship (1936), Big Game Haunt (1968), Get Lost (1956), Transylvania 6-5000 (1963)
1032	169	"Zombie Makeover"	October 29, 2025
Toony and Bill make a zombie movie, with some unbelievable, undead makeup. Featured cartoons: The Night of the Living Duck (1988), There They Go-Go-Go! (1956), Dr. Jekyll and Mr. Mouse (1947), Cat Feud (1958), Hot Cross Bunny (1948)
1033	170	"House Monster"	October 30, 2025
Bill and Toony take a spooky field trip to get into the Halloween spirit. Featured cartoons: Corn on the Cop (1965), Spooky Swabs (1957), Fowled Up Party (1957), Is My Palm Read (1933), Bewitched Bunny (1954)
1034	171	"Mad Scientist"	October 31, 2025
Bill and Toony celebrate the finale of "Boo Bash" at a party with a scary twist. Featured cartoons: Hyde and Hare (1955), Hyde and Sneak (1962), The Case of the Stuttering Pig (1937), Bats in the Belfry (1942), Monster of Ceremonies (1966)
1035	172	"The Roaring Twenties"	November 4, 2025
Bill and Toony revisit the roaring 20s with a special performance by the Windy City Ramblers. Featured cartoons: The Unmentionables (1963), The Cuckoo I.Q. (1941), Golden Yeggs (1950), A Language All My Own (1935), The Zoot Cat (1944)
1036	173	"Cautious Claymation"	November 5, 2025
Bill and Toony make their own claymation film and examine the history of stop-motion animation. Featured cartoons: The Wise Quacking Duck (1943), Pet Peeve (1954), Good-Bye Mr. Moth (1942), Alley to Bali (1954), Kit for Cat (1948)
1037	174	"Elmer Fudd, Wabbit Hunter"	November 6, 2025
Bill and Toony look back on the career of Elmer J. Fudd with the voice of Elmer himself, Jeff Bergman. Featured cartoons: Little Red Walking Hood (1937), Elmer's Candid Camera (1940), The Hare-Brained Hypnotist (1942), Box-Office Bunny (1991), What's Opera, Doc? (1957); Special Guest Appearance: Jeff Bergman as himself.
1038	175	"Trekkin' the Sooner State"	November 7, 2025
Bill and Toony journey through the state of Oklahoma. Featured cartoons: Bonanza Bunny (1959), Ducking the Devil (1957), More Pep (1936), The Poet & Peasant (1946), Pecos Pest (1955)
1039	176	"A Mighty Announcement"	November 10, 2025
Bill and Toony celebrate their latest cartoon additions with six brand new shorts from the Terrytoons library. Featured cartoons: Krakatoa (1945), House Busters (1952), Plumber's Helpers (1953), Mouse Trek (1967), Thousand Smile Check Up (1960), Prehistoric Perils (1951)
1040	177	"Veterans Day"	November 11, 2025
It's a slate of military-themed cartoons on a day honoring our Veterans. Featured cartoons: Forward March Hare (1953), Drafty, Isn't It? (1957), The Mighty Navy (1941), Operation Cold Feet (1957), Just Plane Beep (1965)
1041	178	"The Old-Timey Sports Club"	November 12, 2025
Toony joins Bill's Old-Timey Sports Club to play ancient games and other long-forgotten sports. Featured cartoons: Baseball Bugs (1946), Mother Was a Rooster (1962), Mutts About Racing (1958), Sport Chumpions (1941), To Duck or Not to Duck (1943)
1042	179	"Trekkin' Little Rhody"	November 14, 2025
Small state, big history. Toony and Bill discover Rhode Island from crab cakes to potato toys. Featured cartoons: The Grey Hounded Hare (1949), Blue Plate Symphony (1954), The Foghorn Leghorn (1948), The Dizzy Acrobat (1943), Cat Fishin' (1947)
1043	180	"Yuppie Kay Ay!"	November 17, 2025
Bill goes full Yuppie and tries to revive the excess of the Eighties. Featured cartoons: Long-Haired Hare (1949), Tree's a Crowd (1958), The Million Dollar Cat (1944), Miami Maniacs (1955), Daffy Dilly (1948)
1044	181	"Bill Wants a Trophy"	November 18, 2025
Toony visits the R.S. Owens trophy factory to find Bill a personalized award. Featured cartoons: Johann Mouse (1953), Tweetie Pie (1947), Bugged by a Bee (1969), Gypsy Life (1945), For Scent-imental Reasons (1949)
1045	182	"Trekkin' the Constitution State"	November 20, 2025
Bill and Toony visit the state of Connecticut. Featured cartoons: Knight-mare Hare (1955), Lighthouse Mouse (1955), The Power of Thought (1948), We Aim to Please (1934), The Electronic Mouse Trap (1946)
1046	183	"On the Wagon"	November 21, 2025
Bill takes Toony on a covered wagon journey down the old Oregon Trail. Featured cartoons: Hare Lift (1952), Deadeye Dick (1947), Popalong Popeye (1952), The Rainmakers (1951), Ready, Set, Zoom! (1955)
1047	184	"Toonlandia"	November 24, 2025
Bill and Toony create the micronation of Toonlandia. Featured cartoons: Daffy's Inn Trouble (1961), A Feud There Was (1938), Sliphorn King of Polaroo (1945), Betty Boop and the Little King (1936), Napoleon Bunny-Part (1956)
1048	185	"Infamous Battles"	November 25, 2025
From epic rivalries to blockbuster brawls, Bill and Toony relive some of the most unforgettable battles in history. Featured cartoons: Whoa, Be-Gone! (1958), Professor Tom (1948), Person to Bunny (1960), One Horse Town (1968), The Feudin' Hillbillies (1948)
1049	186	"Paperboy Bill"	November 26, 2025
Bill brings back his old paper route, showing Toony the great American tradition of delivering the news. Featured cartoons: Super-Rabbit (1943), The Johnstown Flood (1946), The Flying Turtle (1953), The Super Salesman (1947), Muzzle Tough (1954)
1050	187	"It's Turkey Day!"	November 27, 2025
Bill and Toony host a friendsgiving. Featured cartoons: Holiday for Drumsticks (1949), Jerky Turkey (1968), Porky's Cafe (1942), Tom Turkey and His Harmonica Humdingers (1940), The Little Orphan (1949)
1051	188	"Hand Me Downs"	December 1, 2025
Bill and Toony talk about the joy of inheriting other people's used stuff. Featured cartoons: From Hare to Heir (1960), I Wish I Had Wings (1932), Baby Wants a Battle (1953), Duck Dodgers in Attack of the Drones (2004), Stage Hoax (1952)
1052	189	"Suburban Life"	December 2, 2025
Bill buys a house in the burbs, and has a shocking new neighbor, Simon Shock. Featured cartoons: House Hunting Mice (1947), Goony Golfers (1948), Highway Slobbery (1964), The Bowling Alley-Cat (1942), Mouse Menace (1946)
1053	190	"Throwback Thursday: 1960"	December 4, 2025
From Andy Griffith to JFK, the first year of the sixties is celebrated. Featured cartoons: Rabbit's Feat (1960), Southern Fried Hospitality (1960), Goldimouse and the Three Cats (1960), Stunt Men (1960), Lighter Than Hare (1960)
1054	191	"Twin Connection"	December 5, 2025
Bill and Toony figure out if twin telepathy is real. Featured cartoons: Droopy's Double Trouble (1951), Taming the Cat (1948), The Fire Alarm (1936), Woolen Under Where (1963), Gopher Broke (1958)
1055	192	"Living Legends of TV"	December 9, 2025
Deborah Norville joins Mr. Quizzer to talk about her new role as game show host. Featured cartoons: Rabbit of Seville (1950), Betty in Blunderland (1934), The Barber of Seville (1944), A Dream Walking (1934), The Two Mouseketeers (1952); Special Guest Appearance: Deborah Norville as herself.
1056	193	"Cleam's Dungeon Plungers"	December 12, 2025
Bill and Toony play the hottest new tabletop role-playing game on the market: Cleam's Dungeon Plungers. Featured cartoons: One Droopy Knight (1957), I Was a Teenage Thumb (1963), Woody's Magic Touch (1971), The Bashful Buzzard (1945), Ali Baba Bunny (1957)
1057	194	"Catch the Connection: Holiday Edition"	December 15, 2025
Mr. Quizzer is back again with a holiday edition of his new game show, "Catch The Connection." Bill, Toony and viewers must guess what all five of the cartoons have in common. Featured cartoons: The Night Before Christmas (1941), Holiday Land (1934), The Legend of Rockabye Point (1955), Peace on Earth (1939), Sandy Claws (1955)
1058	195	"Rival of the Ages: Holiday Edition"	December 16, 2025
We're pitting Boomer versus Zoomer to see which generation reigns supreme with holiday challenges. Featured cartoons: Kitty Kornered (1946), I'm Cold (1954), Mice Follies (1954), A Gander at Mother Goose (1940), Weasel While You Work (1958)
1059	196	"Mr. Quizzer's Trivia Hour: Holiday Edition"	December 17, 2025
Mr. Quizzer presents an hour of holiday trivia along with festive cartoons. Featured cartoons: Gift Wrapped (1952), Strangled Eggs (1961), A Swiss Miss (1951), Let's Sing with Popeye (1934), The Abominable Snow Rabbit (1961)
1060	197	"Throwback Thursday: Holiday Edition"	December 18, 2025
Bill and Toony enjoy the holiday splendor of the 1960s with nostalgic party food, vintage crafting and more. Featured cartoons: Cracked Quack (1952), Busy Bakers (1940), Barney Bear's Polar Pest (1944), Toy Town Hall (1936), A Street Cat Named Sylvester (1953)
1061	198	"Trekkin' All 50: Holiday Edition"	December 19, 2025
Bill and Toony explore regional holiday eats, treats, and traditions around America. Featured cartoons: Hare Force (1944), Yule Laff (1962), 'Sno Fun (1951), Daffy Duck Hunt (1949), Hopalong Casualty (1960)
1062	199	"What's in Store This Holiday Season"	December 22, 2025
Bill and Toony relive nostalgic holiday magic at the department store, including a visit with Santa. Featured cartoons: Riff Raffy Daffy (1948), Hot and Cold Penguin (1955), Gifts from the Air (1937), Seasin's Greetinks! (1933), Ski for Two (1944)
1063	200	"Holiday Markets"	December 23, 2025
Bill and Toony take a trip back to the old country to get into the Christmas spirit and visit holiday markets. Featured cartoons: Bugs Bunny's Christmas Carol (1979), The A-Tom-inable Snowman (1966), Thrills and Chills (1938), Mister and Mistletoe (1955), Freeze Frame (1979)
1064	201	"Christmas Eve Chaos"	December 24, 2025
Toony goes overboard to ensure he's on Santa's nice list. Featured cartoons: Heavenly Puss (1949), Flying South (1947), A Cold Romance (1949), Snow Place Like Home (1966), Fright Before Christmas (1979)
1065	202	"Toon In with Me's Rockin' Christmas"	December 25, 2025
Bill and Toony host a party on Christmas morning with classic Christmas cartoons, live music, Santa and more. Featured cartoons: Bedtime for Sniffles (1940), Hairied and Hurried (1965), Anti-Cats (1950), The Peachy Cobbler (1950), Snow Business (1953)
1066	203	"Model Behavior"	December 30, 2025
Bill and Toony are headed to the hobby store. Featured cartoons: Leghorn Swoggled (1951), Trap Happy (1946), The Solid Tin Coyote (1966), I Never Changes My Altitude (1937), Falling Hare (1943)
1067	204	"2025 Rewind"	December 31, 2025
Bill and Toony take a look back at 2025. Featured cartoons: Bugsy and Mugsy (1957), Sappy New Year (1961), Kiddie League (1959), He Dood It Again (1943), Touché, Pussy Cat! (1954)
