= Penelope Pussycat =

Warner Bros. theatrical cartoon character

- Looney Tunes/Merrie Melodies character
- First appearance: For Scent-imental Reasons (November 12, 1949; 76 years ago)
- Created by: Chuck Jones
- Voiced by: Mel Blanc (1949–1961); June Foray (1959); Julie Bennett (1962); Tress MacNeille (1995–2015); Frank Welker (2000); Eric Bauza (2018); Salli Saffioti (2023–present)

In-universe information
- Species: Tuxedo cat
- Gender: Female
- Family: Jeanette (sister)
- Significant other: Pepé Le Pew
- Nationality: French

Penelope Pussycat is an animated cartoon character, featured in the Warner Bros. classic Looney Tunes and Merrie Melodies animated shorts along with Pepé Le Pew. Although she usually does not speak, her "meows" and "purrs" (or "le mews", "le meows", and "le purrs") were most often provided by Mel Blanc using a feminine voice. The character did not originally have a permanent name; she was alternately referred to as "Penelope", "Fifi", "Fabrette", and "Felice", and animator Chuck Jones' 1960 model sheet calls her "Le Cat". The name Penelope Pussycat was created retroactively for Warner Bros. marketing.

The character first appeared in the 1949 short For Scent-imental Reasons, which won an Academy Award. While the skunk had been used in several earlier cartoons since Odor-able Kitty (1945), the addition of his main love interest in For Scent-imental Reasons solidified his characterization and the structure of all further Pepé films.

== Voices ==
In the 1959 short Really Scent, she was voiced by June Foray; in the 1962 short Louvre Come Back to Me!, she was voiced by Julie Bennett; and in the 2000 film, Tweety's High-Flying Adventure, she was voiced by Frank Welker. Her first speaking role was in the 1995 short Carrotblanca, where she is voiced by Tress MacNeille. In Bugs Bunny Builders, she is voiced by Salli Saffioti and is given a French accent.

== History ==
Penelope Pussycat is best known as the often bewildered love interest of Looney Tunes' anthropomorphic skunk, Pepé Le Pew. Penelope is a black and white cat, who often finds herself with a white stripe down her back, whether painted intentionally or by accident.

She often finds herself being chased by the overly enthusiastic Pepé, but when the occasion has presented itself, Penelope has been portrayed as the pursuer. For Scent-imental Reasons, Little Beau Pepé, and Really Scent have all shown Penelope to harbor an attraction to Pepé whenever his scent is neutralized (though in each cited instance, extenuating circumstances have caused Pepé to become repulsed by her, inciting Penelope to reverse the roles).

In current Warner Bros. merchandise, Penelope and Pepé are portrayed as sharing a mutual attraction towards each other, whereas the Looney Tunes comic book series maintains their chasing relationship. Carrotblanca featured her as the Ilsa analogue to Bugs Bunny's Rick, with Sylvester portraying her husband and Pepé being a minor pursuer.

Penelope Pussycat partly inspired the Tiny Toon Adventures character Furrball, a male cat who, in one episode, is chased by an amorous female skunk (Fifi La Fume) due to getting a white stripe painted down his back and tail.

== Etymology ==
Penelope remained without an official name for many years. In the 1954 short The Cat's Bah, her mistress referred to her as "Penelope". The name was later contradicted in the 1955 short Two Scent's Worth, where she was identified as "Fifi". In the 1959 short Really Scent, she was called "Fabrette". In the 1962 short Louvre Come Back to Me!, she was called "Felice". A model sheet from the early 1990s referred to the character as "Le Cat". The 1995 release of Carrotblanca (a parody of Casablanca) canonized her name as "Penelope Pussycat", with many advertisements for the short crediting her as "Penelope Pussycat in her first speaking role".

== Appearances ==
=== Classic shorts ===
1. For Scent-imental Reasons (1949)
2. Scent-imental Romeo (1951)
3. Little Beau Pepé (1952)
4. The Cats Bah (1954)
5. Past Perfumance (1955)
6. Two Scent's Worth (1955)
7. Heaven Scent (1956)
8. Touché and Go (1957)
9. Really Scent (1959)
10. Who Scent You? (1960)
11. A Scent of the Matterhorn (1961)
12. Louvre Come Back to Me! (1962)

=== Other media ===
- Tiny Toon Adventures (1990–1992)
- Carrotblanca (1995)
- Space Jam (1996) (cameo)
- Tweety's High-Flying Adventure (2000)
- Looney Tunes: Back in Action (2003)
- Looney Tunes: Back in Action (video game) (2003) (cameo)
- Loonatics Unleashed (2005–2007) (cameo)
- Bah, Humduck! A Looney Tunes Christmas (2006)
- The Looney Tunes Show (2011–2014)
- Space Jam: A New Legacy (2021) (teaser advertisement only)
- Looney Tunes World of Mayhem (video game) (2018) (as several characters)
- Bugs Bunny Builders (2023)

== Voice artists ==
- Mel Blanc: 1949-89
- June Foray: Really Scent
- Tress MacNeille: Carrotblanca
- Julie Bennett: Louvre Come Back to Me!
- Eric Bauza: Looney Tunes: World of Mayhem
- Frank Welker: Tweety's High-Flying Adventure
- Salli Saffioti: Bugs Bunny Builders
