= Pete Alvarado =

American artist (1920–2003)

- Pam Martin and Pete Alvarado - Photo courtesy of Pam and Bob Martin.
- Born: Peter J. Alvarado Jr. February 22, 1920 Raton, New Mexico, U.S.
- Died: December 27, 2003 (aged 83) La Crescenta, California, U.S.
- Areas: Penciller, animator, illustrator
- Pseudonyms: Peter Jay, Bart Doe
- Notable works: Two time Academy Award winner for best short subject
- Awards: The Animation Guild, I.A.T.S.E. Local 839 Golden Award for Service to the Craft, Disney Hispanic Artist Award, Warner Bros. 24 "Carrot" Gold Award, ASIFA Winsor McCay Award for Lifetime Achievement in Aninmation

Peter J. Alvarado Jr. (February 22, 1920 – December 27, 2003) was an American animator, background designer and comic book artist. Alvarado's animation career spanned almost 60 years. He was also a prolific contributor to Western Publishing's line of comic books.

== Biography ==
=== Animation ===
Alvarado was born in Raton, New Mexico, and grew up in Glendale, California. He attended the Chouinard Art Institute in the 1930; after graduation he was hired as an assistant animator by the Walt Disney Studio. He provided uncredited work on Snow White and the Seven Dwarves. Around 1939 Alvarado left Disney to find work in New York City, where he provided his earliest comic book art for Funnies Inc., which supplied artwork for Fawcett Publications and Timely Comics (now Marvel Comics).

Alvarado returned to California and Disney Studio in 1941. He left Disney in 1946 to work for Warner Bros. Cartoons. Alvarado became the background painter for Chuck Jones, and his first screen credit was on the 1947 Pepé Le Pew short, Scent-imental Over You. He held this position until 1951, working on several cartoons such as the first Wile E. Coyote and Road Runner cartoon, Fast and Furry-ous, and Chuck Jones' Oscar-winning short For Scent-imental Reasons. His last work with Jones was Scent-imental Romeo in 1951, another cartoon featuring Pepé Le Pew. Alvarado went on to replace Cornett Wood as chief layout artist for Robert McKimson's unit. He left Warner Bros. entirely and was replaced by Bob Givens in 1953.

Alvarado later joined DePatie-Freleng Enterprises after Warner Bros. closed their cartoon division. He worked on several Pink Panther shorts, as well as the short lived animated series Super President.

Around 1971 Alvarado joined Hanna-Barbera as a layout artist; he worked on such series as The Pebbles and Bamm-Bamm Show (1971), Wheelie and the Chopper Bunch (1974), and many others. Alvarado also provided animation and layout work for Film Roman (Garfield and Friends).

Alvarado was the recipient of the 2001 Winsor McCay Award, for his lifetime of achievement in animation, as well as the Animation Guild's 1987 Golden Award.

=== Comic books ===
Concurrently with his animation work, Alvarado also worked as a prolific comic book illustrator. As noted above, he worked from 1939 to 1941 providing artwork for Funnies Inc. Alvarado returned to the comic book world in 1947, in collaboration with Charles McKimson (brother of animator Robert McKimson). McKimson was the art director at Western Publishing Company, and the two (in collaboration with Charles' brother Thomas) drew the Roy Rogers strip under the pen name "Al McKimson." Alvarado went on to draw the Gene Autry newspaper strip and comic book, the Mr. Magoo newspaper strip for its entire run, a long period of the Little Lulu newspaper strip, some work on the Flintstones and Yogi Bear newspaper strip, and fill-in work for almost all the Disney newspaper strips, including an extended period as the main artist on the Donald Duck strip.

The bulk of Alvarado's work at Western was for their anthropomorphic animal comic books. Alvarado provided artwork for almost every Disney (Chip 'n' Dale, Scamp), Warner Bros. (Tweety & Sylvester, Road Runner), Hanna-Barbera (Yogi Bear) and Walter Lantz (Andy Panda) licensed title. He also illustrated comic book adaptations of the animated films The Rescuers, Robin Hood, and Gay Purr-ee.

Alvarado retired from animation in 1999. He died on December 27, 2003, in La Crescenta, California.
