= Box-Office Bunny =

1991 animated short film by Darrell Van Citters

- Directed by: Darrell Van Citters; Diane Keener
- Story by: Charles Carney
- Produced by: Kathleen Helppie-Shipley; Michael Giaimo
- Starring: Jeff Bergman; Jim Cummings; Tress MacNeille
- Music by: Hummie Mann
- Animation by: Ed Bell; Mark Kausler; Toby Shelton; Lennie Graves; Chris Buck; Bob Scott; Greg Vanzo; Tony Fucile; Karenia Kaminski; Nancy Avery; Alan Smart; Ken Bruce; Shawn Keller; Kathi Castillo; George Goodchild; Tom Mazzocco; Bronwen Barry; Dori Littel-Herrick; Hyunsook Cho; Harry Sabin
- Backgrounds by: Alan Bodner; Patricia Keppler; Rose Ann Stire
- Color process: Technicolor
- Production company: Warner Bros. Animation
- Distributed by: Warner Bros. Pictures
- Release date: February 8, 1991
- Running time: 4:58
- Country: United States
- Language: English

Box-Office Bunny is a 1991 Looney Tunes short film directed by Darrell Van Citters and starring Bugs Bunny, Daffy Duck and Elmer Fudd. It was shown in theaters alongside The NeverEnding Story II: The Next Chapter, as well as on the subsequent home media releases for the film. It is Warner Bros.' first Bugs Bunny theatrical release since 1964's False Hare. It was issued to commemorate Bugs' 50th anniversary and is included as a special feature on the DVD for The Looney, Looney, Looney Bugs Bunny Movie. The short marks the debut of Jeff Bergman as the voice of Bugs, Daffy, and Elmer, following the death of Mel Blanc in July 1989.

== Plot ==
The action takes place in a massive movie theater, called "Cineminium". It is a 100-screen multiplex, constructed right above Bugs's rabbit hole. When Bugs surfaces within the theater, usher Elmer Fudd attempts to drive him away because Bugs did not purchase a ticket. Meanwhile, Daffy finds the admission fee of the multiplex too expensive, and instead uses his library card to force open a door and sneak inside, only to stumble into Elmer and Bugs. To divert attention from his own illegal entry, Daffy joins forces with Elmer against Bugs.

Following a chase through the movie theater, Bugs manages to trap his opponents within a projection screen and within the film depicted on it. It is apparently part of the slasher film subgenre and the trapped duo are confronted by a "hockey-mask wearing, chainsaw-wielding maniac". This scares Daffy and Elmer as they try to escape. Bugs ends the cartoon by saying, "It takes a miracle to get into pictures, and now these two jokers wanna get out."

During the ending title, Daffy and Elmer break through the center in their attempt to escape the movie, and Bugs pokes out of the hole that they made and simply says to the audience, "And that's all, folks."

== Cast ==
- Jeff Bergman as Bugs Bunny, Daffy Duck and Elmer Fudd
- Jim Cummings as Actor in movie
- Tress MacNeille as Actress in movie

== Production notes ==
In the late 1980s, Warner Bros. Animation started producing new theatrical animated shorts, featuring the Looney Tunes characters. The Duxorcist (1987) and The Night of the Living Duck (1988) were well-received individually. Both were then incorporated in the compilation film Daffy Duck's Quackbusters (1988). They were followed by Box-Office Bunny, the first theatrical short featuring Bugs Bunny since 1964.

According to director Darrell Van Citters, the Warner Bros. studio was uncertain what to do with the film. It was reportedly completed six to nine months before its actual release. Its release was delayed because the studio wanted to release it alongside one of their feature films, but could not decide which could best serve to spotlight it. It was finally released alongside The NeverEnding Story II: The Next Chapter (1991). The underperformance of the feature film at the box office is thought to have negatively affected the fate of the short.

Kevin Sandler believes the short set an unfortunate pattern for subsequent releases. Later Looney Tunes shorts were similarly attached to children's films which under-performed, in each case dragging the short film with them to relative obscurity. He offers the examples of Chariots of Fur and Richie Rich (1994), Carrotblanca and The Amazing Panda Adventure (1995), Superior Duck to Carpool (1996), and Pullet Surprise to Cats Don't Dance (1997). Staffers involved in the production of several of these shorts reportedly suspected that the studio already knew that these feature films were "hard-to-market". From a marketing perspective, the shorts could then be used to attract additional viewers to the cinema. Sandler himself, however, suspected that Warner Bros. was simply not particularly interested in generating publicity for the animated shorts.

== Reception ==
Charles Solomon praised the film as "funny, fast-paced, brightly colored" and managing to capture the essence of the Bugs-Elmer-Daffy films by Chuck Jones without directly copying them. He found fault, however, with the concept of ending the film "at just over five minutes".

== Sources ==
- Sandler, Kevin S. (1998). "Introduction: Looney Tunes and Merry Metonyms". In Sandler, Kevin S. (ed.). Reading the Rabbit: Explorations in Warner Bros. Animation. Rutgers University Press. ISBN 978-0813525389.

Preceded by Spaced Out Bunny	Bugs Bunny Cartoons; 1991	Succeeded by Carrotblanca
