= A Scent of the Matterhorn =

- Directed by: Chuck Jones
- Story by: Chuck Jones
- Starring: Mel Blanc
- Edited by: Treg Brown
- Music by: Milt Franklyn
- Animation by: Bob Bransford; Ken Harris; Tom Ray; Richard Thompson; Harry Love (effects animation)
- Layouts by: Maurice Noble
- Backgrounds by: Phillip DeGuard
- Color process: Technicolor
- Production company: Warner Bros. Cartoons
- Distributed by: Warner Bros. Pictures
- Release date: June 24, 1961
- Running time: 6 min
- Language: English

A Scent of the Matterhorn is a 1961 Warner Bros. Looney Tunes cartoon written and directed by Chuck Jones (credited as M. Charl Jones). The short was released on June 24, 1961, and stars Pepé Le Pew.

The title is a play on the phrase "ascent of the Matterhorn."

== Plot ==
A road-painting wagon comes loose from its driver's carriage. Tumbling down cliffs, it wildly paints white stripes onto a cow, some chickens, and a pig. As a dog chases Penelope Pussycat, paint falls onto her back, then the wagon crashes into the dog, allowing Penelope to escape. Meanwhile, Pepé Le Pew walks through a meadow, singing "Tiptoe Through the Tulips" until he reaches a cliff edge and spots Penelope below, thinking she is a skunk. Amorous chasing ensues until Penelope reaches a crystal cave that shows her reflection many times. When Pepé catches up to her, he exclaims, "Hey! Girls. Acres and acres of girls, and they are mine, all mine!" Finally, he closes the cave behind him, the doors forming the shape of a heart.
