= Go Away Stowaway =

1967 animated short

- Directed by: Alex Lovy
- Story by: Cal Howard
- Starring: Mel Blanc
- Edited by: Hal Geer
- Music by: William Lava
- Animation by: Volus Jones; Laverne Harding; Ted Bonnicksen; Ed Solomon
- Layouts by: David Hanan; Lin Larsen
- Backgrounds by: Bob Abrams
- Color process: Technicolor
- Production company: Warner Bros.-Seven Arts Animation
- Distributed by: Warner Bros.-Seven Arts; The Vitaphone Corporation
- Release date: September 30, 1967
- Running time: 6 minutes
- Language: English

Go Away Stowaway is a 1967 Warner Bros. Merrie Melodies cartoon directed by Alex Lovy. The short was released on September 30, 1967, and stars Daffy Duck and Speedy Gonzales.

This marks Daffy and Speedy's final appearances in the Merrie Melodies series.

== Plot ==
Daffy, tired of Speedy's singing and antics, decides to take a vacation (prompted by Speedy making him believe it's winter) from the mouse. However, unbeknownst to him, the mouse has stowed away in his luggage.

Speedy reveals himself once they are on a cruise liner, and Daffy quickly tries to get rid of him, but is tricked into the ocean, narrowly avoiding becoming shark bait. He decides to stay in his cabin, but Speedy again tricks him and gets his lunch. Thoroughly annoyed, Daffy attempts to fool Speedy into jumping overboard by pulling the emergency whistle, but instead is himself fooled into jumping ship.

Finally, Daffy drops the anchor as Speedy runs past, missing and sinking the cruise ship. Speedy resumes singing atop Daffy's stomach, who is forced to save them both.

== Notes ==
This cartoon makes use of some Hanna-Barbera sound effects. This was the final Warner Bros. cartoon to use the original "Abstract WB" titles that have been in regular use since 1964. Beginning with the following cartoon, Cool Cat, the title sequences are revised to feature the Warner Bros.-Seven Arts logo.
