= Two Scent's Worth =

- Directed by: Charles M. Jones
- Story by: Charles M. Jones
- Starring: Mel Blanc
- Music by: Milt Franklyn
- Animation by: Ken Harris; Richard Thompson; Abe Levitow; Keith Darling
- Layouts by: Robert Gribbroek
- Backgrounds by: Philip DeGuard
- Color process: Technicolor
- Production company: Warner Bros. Cartoons
- Distributed by: Warner Bros. Pictures
- Release date: October 15, 1955
- Running time: 7:20
- Language: English

Two Scent's Worth is a 1955 Warner Bros. Merrie Melodies short directed by Chuck Jones. The short was released on October 15, 1955, and stars Pepé Le Pew. The title is a play on the term "two cents worth", meaning one's unsolicited opinion.

In the film, a bank robber uses an ordinary cat (Penelope Pussycat) disguised as a skunk to scare away the patrons of the bank. The cat unwittingly attracts a real skunk who falls in love with her. Pepé Le Pew chases his love interest through the French Alps.

== Plot ==
In the small village of Nasty Pass, within the French Alps, a man (in fact a bank robber) visits a fishmonger to buy a sardine, and then returns to a remote flat. The man then uses the sardine as bait, catching Penelope Pussycat (here named Fifi), who is lured by the fish. The man then paints a white stripe on her back to make her look like a skunk to scare away the patrons in a nearby bank. The bank robber makes off with the money and comes across Pepé Le Pew, mistaking him for Penelope at first until Pepé's odor proves otherwise, causing the burglar to run back to the village and turn himself in.

As Penelope wanders out the bank, Pepé sees her and falls in love. He chases her out of the village and into a cable car, which Penelope accidentally activates. Trying to get away from Pepé, she travels along the cable up to a ski jump and is sent flying when she stands on a stray ski, Pepé follows on his own pair of skis until he hits a tree. While Penelope continues on her own ski, Pepé swings across the trees to catch up with her and reunite with his own skis in the process.

A chase across the snow follows with Pepé slowly gaining, so Penelope speeds her ski up, but when she sees a cliff edge, she has to slow down and comes to a stop just inches above the edge. Pepé crashes into her and they go off the edge. Penelope holds onto him tight, more concerned with the fall than his odor but Pepé deploys a heart-shaped parachute, telling the audience that "A true gentleman must be prepared for anything". The cartoon ends with a heart-shaped iris-out to a red background.
