= Hyde and Go Tweet =

1960 film by Friz Freleng

- Directed by: Friz Freleng
- Starring: Mel Blanc (all voices)
- Edited by: Treg Brown
- Music by: Milt Franklyn
- Animation by: Virgil Ross; Gerry Chiniquy; Art Davis
- Layouts by: Hawley Pratt
- Backgrounds by: Tom O'Loughlin
- Color process: Technicolor
- Production company: Warner Bros. Cartoons
- Distributed by: Warner Bros. Pictures
- Release date: May 14, 1960
- Running time: 7 minutes
- Country: United States
- Language: English

Hyde and Go Tweet is a 1960 Warner Bros. Merrie Melodies animated short directed by Friz Freleng. All of the voices were performed by Mel Blanc. The short was released on May 14, 1960, and stars Tweety and Sylvester.

The short is the third directed by Freleng based on Robert Louis Stevenson's 1886 novella Strange Case of Dr. Jekyll and Mr. Hyde following Dr. Jerkyl's Hide (also starring Sylvester) and Hyde and Hare (starring Bugs Bunny). The title is a play on the game hide and go seek. It was featured in the film Daffy Duck's Quackbusters, with new animation showing Sylvester in Daffy Duck's office.

== Plot ==
Sylvester is sleeping on the ledge of a tall building. He is just outside the window of the laboratory and office of mild-mannered Dr. Jekyll, who is shown entering the laboratory, drinking a Hyde Formula and briefly turning into a monstrous, evilly laughing alter-ego. Sylvester hears the laughter and awakens, startled, but when he looks inside the window, he sees only the re-transformed Jekyll departing the laboratory. Sylvester laughs it off and goes back to sleep.

Suddenly waking up, Sylvester tries to catch some pigeons, but to no avail. He then pursues his prey, Tweety, along the building's ledge. Tweety escapes into the laboratory and jumps into the Hyde Formula bottle. Sylvester demands that Tweety show himself, which he does, thanks to the Hyde formula, now as a crazy, evilly laughing giant bird-monster that begins chasing Sylvester.

For most of the rest of the cartoon, Tweety frequently switches between his usual, innocent self (which Sylvester chases) and the evil bird-monster (from which Sylvester runs away). After several back-and-forth chases (which includes Sylvester being tricked by the normal Tweety into running into an out of order chute for an elevator, as well as jumping out a window to escape the evil bird-monster form), Sylvester nabs a normal-sized Tweety. The cat, unaware of his potential meal and the monster are one and the same, locks himself in a small kitchen, throws the key out the window to make sure that Tweety "don't get out and that 'goon' don't get in," and begins to make Tweety into a sandwich. But while Sylvester is searching for some ketchup, Tweety changes back into his menacing, Hyde-like self and devours his adversary whole in a single gulp ("What? No ketchup? Well, I guess I'll just have to eat you without keeeETCH...!"). Finally realizing that the monstrous bird is Tweety, Sylvester frees himself and desperately tries to escape from the room.

Just then, Sylvester awakens to realize that this whole experience was only a nightmare and to see a normal-sized Tweety struggling to fly to the ledge of the building. Fearing the events of his nightmare are about to come true, Sylvester cries out and runs through a brick wall to escape ("Help! Save me! Ah, ah, ah! Save me! He's a killer! HELP!!!"). Two cats (variants of two of the cats in Birds Anonymous) observe his action and each remark "Most outrageous exhibition of wanton cowardice." and "Tsk, tsk, tsk, tsk, tsk...Shameful." Tweety agrees on that, closing the cartoon by telling the audience, "Yeah, shameful!"

== Home media ==
This short is available on the Looney Tunes Collector's Choice: Volume 4 Blu-ray.

== See also ==
- List of American films of 1960
