= For Scent-imental Reasons =

1949 film by Chuck Jones

- Title card
- Directed by: Charles M. Jones
- Story by: Michael Maltese
- Starring: Mel Blanc
- Music by: Carl Stalling
- Animation by: Ben Washam; Ken Harris; Phil Monroe; Lloyd Vaughan
- Layouts by: Robert Gribbroek
- Backgrounds by: Peter Alvarado
- Color process: Technicolor
- Production company: Warner Bros. Cartoons
- Distributed by: Warner Bros. Pictures; The Vitaphone Corporation
- Release date: November 12, 1949
- Running time: 6:55
- Country: United States
- Language: English

For Scent-imental Reasons (stylized as for Scent-imental Reasons) is a 1949 American Looney Tunes short directed by Chuck Jones and written by Michael Maltese. The short was released on November 12, 1949, and featured the debut of Penelope Pussycat (who is unnamed in this cartoon).

It won the Academy Award for Best Animated Short Film in 1949 and was the first Chuck Jones-directed cartoon and the second short produced by Warner Bros. Cartoons to win this award (after Tweetie Pie won in 1947).

== Plot ==
A Parisian perfume shop owner is horrified to find a skunk, Pepé Le Pew, sampling his fragrances. The man calls upon a gendarme for assistance. Unhelpfully, the officer also recoils from Pepé's scent and flees the scene.

A black-and-white stray cat winds around the shop owner's legs, trying to comfort him. Deciding to have her remove Pepé, he tosses her into the store. She slides across the floor, slams into a table, and overturns a bottle of white hair dye. This leads to a white stripe down her back and tail.

Pepé immediately mistakes the cat for a skunk and falls for her. Despite her clear aversion to his smell, he persistently tries to woo her. After failing to scrub off the dye, she locks herself in a glass case (much to his annoyance).

Eventually, she mimed through the glass that she won't come out because he stinks. Heartbroken, he pulls out a gun, puts it to his head, and walks out of the frame. A "bang" is heard, so she frantically rushes out—only to find that he'd tricked her ("I missed, fortunately for you!"). The chase resumes, with Pepé leisurely hopping after the hightailing cat.

The pursuit ends on the second story, where she jumps onto a window ledge. Believing that she is about to end her life out of love for him, he tries to save her. When she slips from his grasp, he dramatically leaps after her. She lands in a barrel of rainwater, and he in a can of blue paint.

Not only has the water washed away the cat's stripe, but it has also given her a cold. She looks so bedraggled that Pepé (who is completely blue) doesn't recognize her. So, he wanders off to search for his "young lady skunk". As he walks away, the cat notices how muscular the paint makes him look. Coupled with the fact that her sinuses are now blocked, she falls in love with him.

Meanwhile, Pepé goes back inside the shop. As soon as he crosses the threshold, the door slams and locks. He turns to see the cat leering at him. She pockets the key in her fur and begins to approach him. Realizing that the tables have turned, he starts running for his life. The cat follows, using his trademark hop, and Pepé ends the cartoon by remarking, "You know, it is possible to be too attractive."

== Notes ==
In 1957, this cartoon was reissued as a Blue Ribbon Merrie Melodies. However, like all cartoons reissued between 1956 and 1959, the opening rendition of "The Merry-Go-Round Broke Down" still plays and the original ending title with the original closing theme was kept.

== Home media ==
- The Blue Ribbon release of this cartoon can be seen on Looney Tunes Golden Collection: Volume 1 (disc 3), Warner Bros. Home Entertainment Academy Awards Animation Collection (disc 1), Looney Tunes Platinum Collection: Volume 1 (disc 1) and Looney Tunes Super Stars' Pepe Le Pew: Zee Best of Zee Best.
- The oft-censored glass case/suicide sequence was used in both the Chuck Jones compilation movie The Bugs Bunny/Road Runner Movie and Chuck Amuck: The Movie, though in the former, the scene with Penelope attempting to wash the stripe off her back is left out.
- This short was featured on the UK Rental VHS release of Singles.
- This short was included as a bonus feature on the Blu-ray release of Gay Purr-ee.

== See also ==
- "(I Love You) For Sentimental Reasons", the song for which the cartoon is named.
