= Scent-imental Over You =

1947 film by Chuck Jones

Scent-imental over You
- Blue Ribbon reissue title card
- Directed by: Charles M. Jones
- Story by: Michael Maltese; Tedd Pierce
- Starring: Mel Blanc
- Music by: Carl Stalling
- Animation by: Ken Harris; Basil Davidovich; Lloyd Vaughan; Ben Washam; A.C. Gamer (Effects animator)
- Layouts by: Robert Gribbroek
- Backgrounds by: Peter Alvarado
- Color process: Technicolor
- Production company: Warner Bros. Cartoons
- Distributed by: Warner Bros. Pictures
- Release date: March 8, 1947
- Running time: 7 minutes (one reel)
- Country: United States
- Language: English

Scent-imental over You is a 1947 Warner Bros. Looney Tunes cartoon directed by Chuck Jones. The short was released on March 8, 1947, and stars Pepé Le Pew.

== Plot ==
A small jealous Mexican hairless dog, wanting to be friends with the other dogs on Park Avenue, decides to borrow a fur coat. Unfortunately, she borrows a skunk pelt by mistake and frightens the other dogs. As she cries her hurt feelings out, she attracts the unwanted attentions of Pepé Le Pew (identified here on the mailbox as "Stinky"). After he corners her in a treehouse, she finally removes the pelt and Pepé reveals he's wearing a mask, showing that he's a dog and the two embrace. Another mask removal proves Pepé is indeed a skunk who doesn't care that his love interest is a dog.

== Home media ==
- Laserdisc - The Golden Age of Looney Tunes Vol 2
- DVD - Looney Tunes Super Stars' Pepe Le Pew: Zee Best of Zee Best
- Blu-ray - Looney Tunes Collector's Vault: Volume 2
