= Little Beau Pepé =

- Title card
- Directed by: Charles M. Jones
- Story by: Michael Maltese; Tedd Pierce
- Starring: Mel Blanc
- Music by: Carl Stalling
- Animation by: Lloyd Vaughan; Ben Washam; Ken Harris; Phil Monroe
- Layouts by: Robert Gribbroek
- Backgrounds by: Philip DeGuard
- Color process: Technicolor
- Production company: Warner Bros. Cartoons
- Distributed by: Warner Bros. Pictures; The Vitaphone Corporation
- Release date: March 29, 1952
- Running time: 7 minutes
- Language: English

Little Beau Pepé is a 1952 Merrie Melodies short directed by Chuck Jones that premiered on March 29, 1952. The short stars Pepé Le Pew and Penelope Pussycat.

== Plot ==
At Le Desert Sahara, a sign in front of the fortress reads, "No Le Pouf Trespassé." Inside, a group of French soldiers are undergoing military training. They march while singing a song, but their leader dismisses them, and they scatter. As they walk away, the scene shifts to Penelope Pussycat sleeping in a designated area. Penelope stirs, and two painters nearby are chatting. When Penelope appears, the painters pet her.

Pepé Le Pew arrives at the entrance, proclaiming himself "the broken heart of love." He expresses his desire to join the foreign legion. He begins filling out a questionnaire, but before he finishes, the enlistment officer is frightened away by Pepé's smell, causing everyone else in the fortress to flee in panic, except Penelope.

Pepé mistakenly believes that the others have left because they think he would be ideal for defending the fort. As Pepé takes charge of defending the fort, Penelope gets up. She walks over to a ladder labeled "Le Painte Dampe" and accidentally acquires a white stripe down her back. Pepé spots her, again mistaking her for a female skunk, and approaches to woo her.

Penelope tries to escape, leading to a chase through the desert and the fortress. At one point, Pepé dresses as Napoleon Bonaparte (calling himself "Josephine") to surprise her. Eventually, Penelope flees into the open desert and collapses from exhaustion near an oasis. Pepé finds her and takes her into a tent. While waiting for her to wake, he mixes several bottles of cologne to "restoke the furnace of love." The resulting scent is so potent that it acts as a love potion; when Penelope wakes, she becomes the aggressor, chasing a terrified Pepé into the distance.

== Production ==
- The short was written by Michael Maltese, who frequently collaborated with Chuck Jones on the Pepé Le Pew series.
- This was one of several shorts submitted by Warner Bros. for an Academy Award for Best Animated Short Film in 1952, though it did not receive a nomination.

== Home media ==
Little Beau Pepé is available on Looney Tunes Super Stars' Pepé Le Pew: Zee Best of Zee Best (2011).
