= Pepé Le Pew =

Warner Bros. theatrical cartoon character

- Looney Tunes/Merrie Melodies character
- First appearance: Odor-able Kitty (January 6, 1945; 81 years ago) (as Henry); Scent-imental Over You (March 8, 1947; 79 years ago) (as Pepé Le Pew)
- Created by: Chuck Jones; Michael Maltese
- Designed by: Bob Givens (1945); Robert Gribbroek (1947–present)
- Voiced by: Mel Blanc (1945–1989); Jeff Bergman (1990–1991, 2004, 2012–2015); Greg Burson (1990–2003); Maurice LaMarche (1996); Joe Alaskey (2000–2010); Billy West (2000–2003); Terry Klassen (Baby Looney Tunes; 2002–2005); Bruce Lanoil (2003); René Auberjonois (2011–2012); Eric Bauza (2017–2026) (see below)

In-universe information
- Species: Striped skunk
- Gender: Male
- Family: Pitu Le Pew (cousin)
- Significant other: Penelope Pussycat
- Nationality: French

Pepé Le Pew is a cartoon character from the Warner Bros. Looney Tunes and Merrie Melodies series of cartoons, introduced in 1945. Depicted as an anthropomorphic French striped skunk, Pepé is constantly in search of love and romance, but his offensive odor and often forceful kissing typically cause other characters to run away from him. He usually pursues a cat who has accidentally had a white stripe painted on her back and tail.

Pepé Le Pew has been criticized for portraying the pursuit and harassment of unwilling female characters as comedy, with his behavior often interpreted as stalking or implying sexual assault. His exaggerated accent, mannerisms, and romantic behavior have also been criticized by some for reinforcing national and cultural stereotypes of French men as overly amorous and sexually aggressive.

== Premise ==
Pepé Le Pew storylines typically involve Pepé in pursuit of a female black cat, whom Pepé mistakes for a skunk ("la belle femme skunk fatale"). The cat, who was retroactively named Penelope Pussycat, often has a white stripe painted down her back, usually by accident (such as by squeezing under a fence with wet white paint). Penelope frantically races to get away from him because of his putrid odor, while Pepé hops after her at a leisurely pace.

=== Settings ===
The setting is always a mise-en-scène echoing with fractured French. They include Paris in the springtime, the Matterhorn, or the little village of N'est-ce Pas in the French Alps. The exotic locales, such as Algiers, are drawn from the story of the 1937 film Pépé le Moko. Settings associated in popular culture with romance, such as the Champs-Élysées or the Eiffel Tower, are sometimes present. One episode (Little Beau Pepé, 1952) was set in the Sahara Desert, with Pepé seeking to enlist as a Legionnaire at a French military outpost.

=== Reversals ===
In a role-reversal, the 1949 short For Scent-imental Reasons ended with an accidentally painted blue (and now terrified) Pepé being pursued by a madly smitten Penelope (who has been dunked in dirty water, leaving her with a ratty appearance and a developing head cold, completely clogging up her nose). It turns out that Pepé's new color is just right for her (plus the fact that the blue paint now covers his putrid scent). Penelope locks him up inside a perfume shop, hiding the key down her chest, and proceeds to chase the now-imprisoned and effectively odorless Pepé.

In another short, Little Beau Pepé, Pepé, attempting to find the most arousing cologne with which to impress Penelope, sprays a combination of perfumes and colognes upon himself. This resulted in something close to a love potion, leading Penelope to fall madly in love with Pepé in an explosion of hearts. Pepé is revealed to be extremely frightened of overly-affectionate women ("But Madame!"), much to his dismay, as Penelope quickly captures him and smothers him in more love than even he could imagine.

And yet again, in Really Scent, Pepé removes his odor by locking himself in a deodorant plant so Penelope (known in this short as "Fabrette"; a black cat with an unfortunate marking) would like him (this is also the only episode that Pepé is acutely aware of his own odor, having checked the word "pew" in the dictionary). However, Penelope (who in this picture is actually trying to have a relationship with Pepé because all the male cats of New Orleans take her to be a skunk and run like blazes, but is appalled by his odor) had decided to make her own odor match her appearance and had locked herself in a Limburger cheese factory. Now more forceful and demanding, Penelope quickly corners the terrified Pepé, who, after smelling her new stench, wants nothing more than to escape the amorous female cat. Unfortunately, now she will not take "no" for an answer and proceeds to chase Pepé off into the distance, with no intention of letting him escape. (Note: Credited to Abe Levitow, this cartoon is the only short in the Pepé Le Pew series not directed by Chuck Jones, save the debatable Odor of the Day.)

Although Pepé usually mistakes Penelope for a female skunk, in Past Perfumance, he realizes that she is a cat when her stripe washes off. Undeterred, he proceeds to cover his white stripe with black paint, taking the appearance of a cat before resuming the chase.

To emphasize Pepé's cheerful dominance of the situation, Penelope is always mute (or more precisely, makes only natural cat sounds, albeit with a stereotypical "le" before each one) in these stories; only the self-deluded Pepé speaks (several non-recurring human characters are given minimal dialogue, often nothing more than a repulsed "Le pew!").

=== Variations ===
Sometimes this formula is varied. In his initial cartoon, Odor-able Kitty, Pepé (who was revealed to be a French-American skunk named Henri in this short) unwittingly pursues a red tabby cat who has intentionally disguised himself as a skunk (complete with the scent of Limburger cheese) in order to scare off a bunch of characters who have mistreated him. Scent-imental Over You has Pepé pursuing a female Chihuahua who has donned a skunk pelt (mistaking it for a fur coat). In the end, she removes her pelt, revealing that she is a dog. However, he then reveals to the audience that he is a real skunk.

In Wild Over You, Pepé attempts to seduce a female wildcat who had escaped a zoo (during what is called "Le grande tour du Zoo" at a 1900 exhibition) and painted herself to look like a skunk to escape her keepers. This cartoon is notable for not only diverging from the Pepé/female-black-cat dynamic, but also rather cheekily showing that Pepé likes to be beaten up, considering the wildcat thrashes him numerous times. Really Scent is also a subversion with Penelope (here called "Fabrette") attracted to him from the beginning, removing the need for Pepé to chase her as she goes to him. But Pepé's scent still causes a problem for her as they try to build a relationship.

== Production ==
Pepé was created at Warner Bros. Cartoons by animation director Chuck Jones and writer Michael Maltese. Jones wrote that Pepé was based (loosely) on the personality of his Termite Terrace colleague, writer Tedd Pierce, a self-styled "ladies' man" who reportedly always assumed that his infatuations were reciprocated. In a short documentary film, Chuck Jones: Memories of Childhood, Jones told an interviewer (perhaps jokingly) that Pepé was actually based on himself, except that he was very shy with girls. Animation producer Edward Selzer, who was then Jones' bitterest foe at the studio, once profanely commented that no one would laugh at the Pepé cartoons. However, this did not keep Selzer from accepting an award for one of Pepé's pictures several years later.

Prior to the character's creation, the 1944 Looney Tunes short, I Got Plenty of Mutton, directed by Frank Tashlin and written by Melvin Millar, features an antecedent premise with a hungry wolf dressing up as a ewe to fool a ram named Killer Diller from guarding a flock of sheep (a gag later adapted by Jones in his Ralph Wolf and Sam Sheepdog cartoons). The infatuated ram proceeds to aggressively romance the horrified wolf in a style identical to Pepé, with Mel Blanc using the same faux-French accent and endearments featured in the later Pepé cartoons, with Diller even employing the same prancing gait later associated with Pepé for his pursuit. When the character of Pepé was more fully developed for cartoons of his own, Mel Blanc based Pepé's voice on Charles Boyer's Pépé le Moko from Algiers (1938), a remake of the 1937 French film Pépé le Moko. Blanc's voice for the character closely resembled a voice he had used for "Professor Le Blanc", a harried violin instructor on The Jack Benny Program.

In Pepé's short cartoons, a kind of pseudo-French or Franglais is spoken and written primarily by adding the French article le to English words (as in "le skunk de pew") or by more creative mangling of English expressions and French syntax, such as "Sacré maroon!", "My sweet peanut of brittle", "Come to me, my little melon-baby collie!", "Ah, my little darling, it is love at first sight, is it not, no?", and "It is love at sight first!" The writer responsible for these malapropisms was Michael Maltese.

An example of dialogue from the Oscar-winning 1949 short For Scent-imental Reasons illustrates the use of French and broken French:

Pepé: (sings) Affaire d'amour? Affaire de coeur?
Gendarme: Le kittée quel terrible odeur!
Pepé: (sings) Je ne sais quoi, je vive en espoir… (sniffs) Mmmm m mm… un smell à vous finez… (hums; Gendarme leaves)
Proprietor: Allez, Gendarme! Allez! Retournez-moi! This instonce! Oh, pauvre moi, I am ze bankrupt… (sobs)
Cat/Penelope: Le mew? Le purrrrrrr.
Proprietor: A-a-ahhh. Le pussy ferocious! Remove zot skunk! Zot cat-pole from ze premises! Avec! (tosses cat into the building)
Cat/Penelope: (smells skunk) Sniff, sniff, sniff-sniff, sniff-sniff.
Pepé: Quel est? (notices cat) Ahh! Le belle femme skunk fatale! (clicks tongue twice)

=== Later appearances ===
Pepé appeared with several other Looney Tunes characters in Filmation's 1972 made-for-TV special Daffy Duck and Porky Pig Meet the Groovie Goolies. In the King Arthur film Daffy Duck's studio was producing in the story, Pepé played assistant to Mordred (played by Yosemite Sam).

Pepé was going to have a cameo in the 1988 film Who Framed Roger Rabbit, but was later dropped for unknown reasons.

Pepé made several cameo appearances in the 1990 series Tiny Toon Adventures (voiced by Greg Burson) as a professor at Acme Looniversity and the mentor to the female skunk character Fifi La Fume. He appeared briefly in "The Looney Beginning" and had a more extended cameo in "It's a Wonderful Tiny Toon Adventures Christmas Special". The segment "Out of Odor" from the episode "Viewer Mail Day" saw Elmyra Duff disguise herself as Pepé in an attempt to lure Fifi into a trap, only to have Fifi begin aggressively wooing her. Pepé also made cameo appearances in the Histeria! episode "When America Was Young" and in the Goodfeathers segment, "We're No Pigeons", in Animaniacs. In the 1995 animated short Carrotblanca, a parody/homage of the classic film Casablanca, both Pepé and Penelope appear. Pepé (voiced by Greg Burson) as Captain Renault and Penelope (voiced by Tress MacNeille) as "Kitty Ketty" (modeled after Ingrid Bergman's performance as Ilsa). Unlike the character's other appearances in cartoons, Penelope (as Kitty) has extensive speaking parts in Carrotblanca.

In The Sylvester & Tweety Mysteries, in the episode, "Platinum Wheel of Fortune", when Sylvester gets a white stripe on his back, a skunk immediately falls in love with him. This is not Pepé, but a similar character identified as "Pitu Le Pew" (voiced by Jeff Bennett). However, he does mention Pepé by name, calling him his "third cousin". Pepé would later appear in the episode "Is Paris Stinking" (voiced by Greg Burson), where he pursues Sylvester who is unintentionally dressed in drag. He would appear once more in Tweety's High-Flying Adventure (voiced by Joe Alaskey), falling in love with both Sylvester and Penelope (Sylvester had gotten a white stripe on his back from Penelope as they fought over Tweety), actually showing a preference for Sylvester.

Pepé appears in the 1996 film Space Jam (voiced by Maurice LaMarche), as part of the Tune Squad team. He also appears in the 2003 film Looney Tunes: Back in Action (voiced by Bruce Lanoil) during the Paris scene, as a police officer who tries to help DJ (played by Brendan Fraser) after Kate (played by Jenna Elfman) is kidnapped. Pepé was, at one point, integral to the storyline for the film; originally, once Bugs Bunny, Daffy Duck, DJ, and Kate arrived in Paris, Pepé was to give them a mission briefing inside a gift shop. Even though Pepé's scene was cut, some unused animation of him and Penelope appears during the end credits, and his cut scene appears in the film's print adaptations.

In Loonatics Unleashed, a human based on Pepé Le Pew called Pierre Le Pew (voiced by Maurice LaMarche) has appeared as one of the villains of the second season of the show. Additionally, Pepé and Penelope Pussycat appear as cameos in a display of Otto the Odd in the episode "The Hunter". In the episode "The World is My Circus", Lexi Bunny complains that "this Pepé Le Pew look is definitely not me" after being mutated into a skunk-like creature.

Pepé also appeared on the 2006 direct-to-DVD movie Bah, Humduck! A Looney Tunes Christmas (voiced by Joe Alaskey) as one of Daffy's employees.

A 2009 Valentine's Day-themed AT&T commercial brings Pepé (voiced by Joe Alaskey) and Penelope's relationship up to date, depicting Penelope not as repulsed by Pepé, but madly in love with him. The commercial begins with Penelope deliberately painting a white stripe on her own back; when her cell phone rings and displays Pepé's picture, Penelope's lovestruck beating heart bulges beneath her chest in a classic cartoon image. The commercial was produced by N. W. Ayer & Son and directed by Rich Arons at G7 Animation, with character designs by Millet Henson.

A baby version of Pepé Le Pew appeared in Baby Looney Tunes, voiced by Terry Klassen. In the episode "New Cat in Town", everyone thought that he was a cat. In another episode, titled "Stop and Smell Up the Flowers", Pepé Le Pew is shown to be good friends with a baby Gossamer.

Pepé Le Pew appeared in The Looney Tunes Show episode "Members Only", voiced by René Auberjonois in season one and by Jeff Bergman in season two. He was present at the arranged marriage of Bugs Bunny and Lola Bunny, in which Lola fell in love with Pepé and left Bugs at the altar. He also made a short cameo appearance with Penelope Pussycat in the Merrie Melodies segment "Cock of the Walk" sung by Foghorn Leghorn. He appeared in his own music video "Skunk Funk" in the 16th episode "That's My Baby". He also appeared again in another Merrie Melodies segment "You Like/I Like" sung by Mac and Tosh. His first appearance in the second season was in the second episode entitled "You've Got Hate Mail", reading a hate-filled email accidentally sent by Daffy Duck. He also had a short appearance in the Christmas special "A Christmas Carol" where he takes part in the song "Christmas Rules." In "Gribbler's Quest," Pepé Le Pew is shown to be in the same group therapy with Daffy Duck, Marvin the Martian, and Yosemite Sam.

Pepé appeared in the 2015 direct-to-video film Looney Tunes: Rabbits Run, voiced by Jeff Bergman, as the head of a major perfumery for whom Lola wants to create a signature scent.

Pepé also appeared in New Looney Tunes (formerly called Wabbit), voiced by Eric Bauza, in the role of a James Bond-like secret agent.

Pepé made a cameo in the Animaniacs reboot series, in the second season episode "Yakko Amakko".

Pepé also made a cameo in the 2026 film Coyote vs. Acme, marking his official return and first appearance since November 2021. In the film, he is repelled using "Anti-Predator Spray" developed by the Acme Corporation, in a nod to the controversy surrounding the character.

The character appeared in the video games The Bugs Bunny Birthday Blowout, Bugs Bunny Rabbit Rampage, Space Jam, Bugs Bunny: Crazy Castle 3, Bugs Bunny: Crazy Castle 4, Looney Tunes: Back in Action, Looney Tunes: Acme Arsenal, and Looney Tunes: World of Mayhem.

== Criticism ==
The character has been criticized due to his antics being perceived as perpetuating stereotypes of French culture. Amber E. George, in her 2017 essay "Pride or Prejudice? Exploring Issues of Queerness, Speciesism, and Disability in Warner Bros. Looney Tunes", describes Pepé's actions towards Penelope Pussycat as "sexual harassment, stalking, and abuse" and noted that Pepé's qualities mock the French people and their culture.

Linda Jones Clough, the daughter of Pepé's creator, says she does not think anyone would watch Pepé cartoons and be inspired to rape someone, but she saw the choice to temporarily discontinue his appearances as an appropriate decision. Clough also suggested something that reflected her father's vision, to write him as a job-seeker who keeps getting rejected, but changes up his routine thinking he is perfect. Gabriel Iglesias, voice of Speedy Gonzales in Space Jam: A New Legacy, said that he could not say that he ever saw the character in a negative light and that growing up watching the original cartoons, he said that it was just from a different time. At the Academy Museum of Motion Pictures, a slideshow named "Woman in U.S. Animation" shows cartoons that shows "imagery that implies sexual assault", including Pepé Le Pew.

In March 2021, as a result of controversy surrounding the character, Pepé Le Pew was reported to be removed from modern Warner Bros. projects until further notice, starting with Space Jam: A New Legacy. However, the character has been seen in later projects since then. According to Gabe Swarr, the Animaniacs episode "Yakko Amakko", which featured a cameo of the character, was written before the controversy.

In Latin America, the removal of Pepé Le Pew caused a social debate among netizens who argued about alleged double standards between male accosting and that perpetrated by female characters in fiction. Those supporting the reinstatement of Pepé Le Pew took the example of Doña Clotilde, a character from El Chavo del Ocho, a Mexican sitcom from the 1970s where Clotilde shows romantic (and unreciprocal) infatuation with the character of Don Ramón. The campaign included public calls to cancel Doña Clotilde in retransmissions of El Chavo.

== Cancelled film ==
In October 2010, it was reported that Mike Myers would voice Pepé Le Pew in a feature-length live-action/animated film based on the character, although no information about this project has surfaced since. In July 2016, it was revealed at San Diego Comic-Con that Max Landis was writing a fully animated Pepé Le Pew feature film for Warner Bros. The movie was cancelled due to sexual assault allegations against Landis in 2017.

== Voice actors ==
- Mel Blanc (1945–1989)
- Gilbert Mack (Golden Records records, Bugs Bunny Songfest)
- Jeff Bergman (Bugs Bunny's 50th Birthday Spectacular, Bugs Bunny's Lunar Tunes, Boomerang bumper, The Looney Tunes Show (season 2), Looney Tunes: Rabbits Run)
- Greg Burson (Tiny Toon Adventures, Looney Tunes River Ride, Marshalls commercial, The Toonite Show Starring Bugs Bunny, Have Yourself a Looney Tunes Christmas, Carrotblanca, The Sylvester and Tweety Mysteries, The Looney West, Bugs & Friends Sing Elvis, MCI commercials, Bugs Bunny's Learning Adventures, The Royal Mallard)
- Keith Scott (Spectacular Light and Sound Show Illuminanza, The Looney Tunes Radio Show, Looney Rock)
- Maurice LaMarche (Space Jam)
- Joe Alaskey (Crash! Bang! Boom! The Best of WB Sound FX, Tweety's High Flying Adventure, The Looney Tunes Kwazy Christmas, Bah, Humduck! A Looney Tunes Christmas, AT&T commercial, TomTom Looney Tunes GPS)
- Billy West (Looney Tunes Racing, Looney Tunes: Space Race, Looney Tunes: Back in Action – The Video Game)
- Terry Klassen (Baby Looney Tunes)
- Bruce Lanoil (Looney Tunes: Back in Action)
- Jeff Bennett (A Looney Tunes Sing-A-Long Christmas)
- René Auberjonois (The Looney Tunes Show (season 1))
- Kevin Shinick (Mad)
- Eric Bauza (Converse commercials, New Looney Tunes, Looney Tunes: World of Mayhem, Animaniacs, Coyote vs. Acme)

== Filmography ==
Shorts (1945–1962)

All 18 shorts directed by Chuck Jones unless otherwise indicated.

1. Odor-able Kitty (1945) (only appearance and mention of Pepé Le Pew's wife)
2. Fair and Worm-er (1946) (brief appearance; the skunk in this short may or may not be Pepé)
3. Scent-imental Over You (1947) (only time Pepé chases a dog instead of a cat)
4. Odor of the Day (1948) (directed by Arthur Davis)
5. For Scent-imental Reasons (1949) (Academy Award for Best Animated Short Film)
6. Scent-imental Romeo (1951)
7. Little Beau Pepé (1952)
8. Wild Over You (1953)
9. Dog Pounded (1954) (cameo in a Sylvester and Tweety cartoon; directed by Friz Freleng)
10. The Cats Bah (1954)
11. Past Perfumance (1955)
12. Two Scent's Worth (1955)
13. Heaven Scent (1956)
14. Touché and Go (1957)
15. Really Scent (1959) (directed by Abe Levitow with Jones' animation unit)
16. Who Scent You? (1960)
17. A Scent of the Matterhorn (1961) (credited as M. Charl Jones)
18. Louvre Come Back to Me! (1962)

== See also ==
- Little 'Tinker – a character with an identical premise from competitor MGM.

== Bibliography ==
- Jones, Chuck (1989). Chuck Amuck. Avon. ISBN 0-380-71214-8.
