= A Language All My Own =

- Directed by: Dave Fleischer
- Story by: Jack Ward; Thomas Johnson (all uncredited)
- Produced by: Max Fleischer
- Starring: Mae Questel
- Music by: Sammy Timberg (uncredited)
- Animation by: Hicks Lokey; Myron Waldman; Edward Nolan (unc.); Lillian Friedman (unc.); Herman Cohen (unc.); Sam Stimson (unc.)
- Color process: Black-and-white
- Production company: Fleischer Studios
- Distributed by: Paramount Pictures
- Release date: July 19, 1935
- Running time: 6 minutes
- Country: United States
- Languages: English; Japanese

A Language All My Own is a 1935 Fleischer Studios animated short film starring Betty Boop.

== Synopsis ==
Betty flies to Japan to do a show, and sings the title number. She then dons a kimono, and sings it again in Japanese.

== Production ==
The studio produced this short after discovering that Betty was very popular in Japan. Animator Myron Waldman, worried that Betty's gestures might offend the conservative Japanese audience, asked a group of Japanese college students to review his work.
