= Scent-imental Romeo =

- Directed by: Charles M. Jones
- Story by: Michael Maltese
- Starring: Mel Blanc
- Music by: Carl Stalling
- Animation by: Ben Washam; Lloyd Vaughan; Ken Harris; Phil Monroe
- Layouts by: Robert Gribbroek
- Backgrounds by: Peter Alvarado
- Color process: Technicolor
- Production company: Warner Bros. Cartoons
- Distributed by: Warner Bros. Pictures
- Release date: March 24, 1951
- Running time: 7 min (one reel)
- Language: English

Scent-imental Romeo is a 1951 Warner Bros. Merrie Melodies animated short directed by Chuck Jones. The short was released on March 24, 1951, and stars Pepé Le Pew.

== Plot ==
In the Paris Zoo, Penelope Pussycat is starving and tries to beg the local zookeeper to give her some of the lions' food but he gently, though firmly, refuses. She then deliberately paints a white stripe on her back, disguising herself as a skunk, so as to be fed. The ploy works, but unfortunately for Penelope, she is discovered by Pepé, who immediately mistakes her for "le petite femme skunk" and pursues her affections.

Suddenly however, Pepé remembers his plan of a rendezvous. He sets up a makeshift house, serving Penelope champagne. She escapes Pepé, who (of course) pursues, believing her to be playing the "lovers' chase", which he obliges. While looking for Penelope, he (unintentionally) scares off a French Poodle in the process. He later finds Penelope near a corner, and she hits him with a mallet. Pepé recovered from the blow and called her a "Flirt."

Pepé follows his "lover" into a tunnel of love, but at the other side, he is smooching and hugging a dumbfounded man, mistaking him for Penelope. Once Pepé realizes he got the wrong person, he angrily declares that the man shall hear from his "second" (in a duel), to which the man (mechanically) replies by joining the French Foreign Legion and saluting before fainting.

Penelope climbs a wall, running into Pepé once more, who acts like Maurice Chevalier, singing "Babyface" in an attempt to woo her. When that didn't quite work, he pursues her across Paris and caught her. Pepé dances with Penelope in a forceful French Apache dance, but she instinctively bashes him over the head with a club. Pepé was seeing multiple Penelopes in a daze, saying that one may remain, while the rest of them, another day. But, just as the chase was about to resume, the zookeeper then finally catches Pepé, who regretfully waves goodbye to Penelope, and is soon put back in his cage. It may turn out to be a headache for Pepé, but he closes the cartoon saying with a simple, "Vive l'amour."
