= Odor-able Kitty =

- Lobby card
- Directed by: Charles M. Jones
- Story by: Tedd Pierce; Michael Maltese
- Starring: Mel Blanc
- Music by: Carl W. Stalling
- Animation by: Robert Cannon; Ken Harris; Ben Washam; A.C. Gamer
- Layouts by: Earl Klein
- Backgrounds by: Robert Gribbroek
- Color process: Technicolor
- Production company: Warner Bros. Cartoons
- Distributed by: Warner Bros. Pictures; The Vitaphone Corporation
- Release date: January 6, 1945
- Running time: 7:15
- Country: United States
- Language: English

Odor-able Kitty is a 1945 Warner Bros. Looney Tunes cartoon directed by Chuck Jones. The short was released on January 6, 1945, and was the first appearance of the romantic skunk Pepé Le Pew (here being named "Henry").

The scriptwriter was Tedd Pierce. Jones, a co-creator of the character, also credited Michael Maltese with contributing to the character concept.

In the film, an orange male cat disguises himself as a skunk, and becomes the object of unrequited love for an actual skunk.

== Plot ==
After so much abuse, (being thrown out of a butcher's meat store, shooed from a house, and attacked by a dog) an orange cat decides that he has got to do something about it. Thinking that it would make things easier, the cat disguises himself as a skunk using paint and smelly substances. Although he is successful in keeping his tormentors at bay, he accidentally attracts the unwanted attention of a real skunk, "Henry".

The cat runs from him and hides in a tree, where the skunk then appears out of nowhere. The cat runs into the town, grabs a skunk fur, then runs to a silo, from which he threatens to jump if the skunk gets any closer. The cat throws the skunk fur from the top of the silo, hoping to deceive the skunk. But as the cat sneaks down the steps, Henry realizes that the fur is just a fur, and resumes pursuing the cat. Continuing to run, the cat accidentally brings a dog into the mix, then tries a Bugs Bunny costume to fool Henry. But the disguise does not work, as the skunk pulls off the bunny’s head to reveal the cat.

Once the cat is tired and worn out, Henry cuddles with him until someone interrupts; it turns out to be the skunk's wife and two kids. Standing in disbelief (and completely dropping his French accent), Henry claims that he was only "wiping a cinder from a lady's eye," but she, still thinking that he is cheating on her with someone else, begins to repeatedly beat him on the head with her umbrella as the cat crawls away to escape and remove all of the paint and smell. The cat realizes that he would rather endure the abuse than be with a smelly skunk.

== Home media ==
- Laserdisc - The Golden Age of Looney Tunes Vol. 1, Side 2: Firsts
- VHS - The Golden Age of Looney Tunes Vol. 2: Firsts
- DVD - Looney Tunes Golden Collection: Volume 3
- DVD - Looney Tunes Super Stars' Pepe Le Pew: Zee Best of Zee Best
- Blu-Ray - Looney Tunes Collector's Vault: Volume 1
