= Touché and Go =

- Directed by: Chuck Jones
- Story by: Michael Maltese
- Starring: Mel Blanc
- Edited by: Treg Brown
- Music by: Milt Franklyn
- Animation by: Richard Thompson; Ken Harris; Abe Levitow
- Layouts by: Maurice Noble
- Backgrounds by: Philip DeGuard
- Color process: Technicolor
- Production company: Warner Bros. Cartoons
- Distributed by: Warner Bros. Pictures
- Release date: October 12, 1957
- Running time: 6 minutes
- Language: English

Touché and Go is a 1957 Warner Bros. Merrie Melodies cartoon directed by Chuck Jones. The short was released on October 12, 1957, and stars Pepé Le Pew and Penelope Pussycat.

== Plot ==
As a street painter paints out a white line in the middle of a road, Penelope is being chased by a dog and runs right under the paint tank, getting a white line across her spine whilst the dog crashes into the tank and painter. Upset with the dog for making a mess of his work, the painter kicks the dog down the hill.

Pepé emerges from a fishing boat, scaring the boatman and sinking the ship. Pepé spies Penelope on a beach. He rushes and catches her with a few smooches while she wriggles her way out. As she scurries away, Pepé grabs her tail and rides it until he slams into a post. After a bit of daydreaming, Pepé resumes his chase.

Pepé pursues Penelope but slips on the sand and falls down a sea cliff into the sea. As Penelope reaches the rocks below, Pepé emerges, embracing her and offering her a glass of water. When Pepé returns with the glass of water, he finds she has run off.

Pepé finds, embraces, and kisses Penelope on a boat, but Penelope makes her escape into the sea with a diving mask and oxygen tank. Pepé follows, wearing a mask and flippers but no oxygen tank (being a skunk, he can hold his breath for a long time). A shark approaches and eats Pepé, but Pepé's stink makes the shark spit him out and flee on the beach.

Penelope swims under the sea for a long time until sunset, when she surfaces to find a nearby island. As she removes her diving gear, she finds Pepé waiting for her. As Pepé endlessly chases Penelope, the island is revealed to be heart-shaped from a birdseye view.

== Music ==
- I've Been Working on the Railroad by Traditional
- Alouette (song) by Traditional
