= Carrotblanca =

1995 Looney Tunes cartoon

- Directed by: Douglas McCarthy; Spike Brandt; Tony Cervone
- Story by: Timothy Cahill; Julie McNally
- Produced by: Timothy Cahill; Julie McNally; Kathleen Helppie-Shipley
- Starring: Joe Alaskey; Bob Bergen; Greg Burson; Maurice LaMarche; Tress MacNeille
- Edited by: Rick Gehr
- Music by: Richard Stone; Julie Bernstein (orchestration)
- Animation by: Tony Cervone; Shawn Keller; Harry Sabin; Jeff Siergey; David S. Smith; Bill Snelgrove; Bill Waldman; Nelson Recinos; Phil Cummings; Bill Knoll; Kathleen Mauro; Doug Bombardier; Myung Miller; Ivan Camilli; Bill Mimms; Ed Gabriel; Herb Moore; George Goodchild; Myung Nam; David Hancock; Doug Ninneman; Mary Hanley; David Recinos; Sandy Henkin; Joe Roman; Myung Kang; Rodeny Tirey; Miyul Lee; Elyse Whittaker
- Layouts by: Bryan Evans; Ed Hayney; Dave Kuhn
- Backgrounds by: Patricia Keppler; Tim Maloney
- Production company: Warner Bros. Animation
- Distributed by: Warner Bros. Pictures
- Release date: August 25, 1995
- Running time: 8 minutes
- Country: United States
- Language: English

Carrotblanca is a 1995 Looney Tunes cartoon short. It was originally shown in theaters alongside The Amazing Panda Adventure (in North America) and The Pebble and the Penguin (internationally). It was subsequently released on video packaged with older Looney Tunes cartoons and was included in the special edition DVD. It was later released on HD DVD, Blu-ray, and iTunes releases of Casablanca, the film to which it is both a parody and a homage.

== Plot ==
Set during the North African campaign, General Pandemonium (Yosemite Sam) gets a frantic call from Foghorn Leghorn saying that a secret German document has been stolen, and immediately heads for the Carrotblanca nightclub―the Cafe Au Lait Americain featuring "Eleanor Roosevelt's All girl revue" with his driver, Sam Sheepdog. At the nightclub, Usmarte (Tweety), the actual thief, convinces Mr. Bugs to take the document.

Meanwhile, Sylvester Slaszlo and his wife, Kitty (Penelope Pussycat), arrive at the club. Kitty attracts the unwanted attention of Captain Louis (Pepé Le Pew), but she scratches him and throws him into a wall. Kitty, Bugs' ex-girlfriend, asks Duck Sam (Daffy Duck) to play her favorite song. The general suspects Slaszlo may know about the document and binds him in his office. Kitty pleads with Bugs to help Slaszlo escape. Though Bugs is initially reluctant because Kitty broke his heart, he decides to go to the General's office and trick the General into entering his own jail.

Slaszlo and Kitty escape on the plane for Toronto, New York City and Cucamonga via Paris, as Bugs watches them go... except they find Louis on the plane working as a steward. Louis offers Kitty some tea, causing her to jump out of the aircraft in fright, seemingly without a parachute, landing in front of Bugs. They kiss, and then the parachute opens, covering them.

== Cast ==
- Greg Burson as Mr. Bugs, Foghorn Leghorn, Captain Louis, and Airport PA Announcer
- Joe Alaskey as Sam Duck and Sylvester Slaszlo
- Bob Bergen as Usmarte and The Crusher
- Maurice LaMarche as General Pandemonium
- Tress MacNeille as Kitty

=== Cameo characters ===
- Porky Pig
- Sam Sheepdog
- Spike the Bulldog and Chester the Terrier
- Granny
- Pete Puma
- Beaky Buzzard
- Giovanni Jones
- Elmer Fudd
- Rocky and Mugsy
- Gossamer
- Barnyard Dawg
- Miss Prissy
- The Crusher

== Production notes ==
Unlike the previous modern Looney Tunes shorts, this short was not made by the Greg Ford/Terry Lennon team nor Chuck Jones Film Productions. It was produced by the Animaniacs writing team at Warner Bros. Feature Animation. Carrotblanca was the only Looney Tunes short produced by that group of writers and the Feature Animation division. The idea for the short came to be when Timothy Cahill and Julie McNally saw a 50th anniversary screening of Casablanca. The company that they worked for had the license to make Looney Tunes merchandise. They pitched the idea of the Looney Tunes characters doing a parody of Casablanca to the executives of Warner Bros. at the time, Bob Daly and Terry Semel. They were interested, and the short became the first Warner Bros. project that Cahill and McNally ever worked for writing and producing it. They worked with director Douglas McCarthy and composer Richard Stone, and as time passed, the project went from a TV special to an 8-minute short. Voices were provided by Greg Burson, Joe Alaskey, Maurice LaMarche, Bob Bergen, and Tress MacNeille. The short was animated by Tony Cervone, Shawn Keller, Harry Sabin, Jeff Siergey, David S. Smith, Bill Snelgrove, Bill Waldman, Nelson Recinos, Phil Cummings, Bill Knoll, Kathleen Mauro, Doug Bombardier, Myung Miller, Ivan Camilli, Bill Mimms, Ed Gabriel, Herb Moore, George Goodchild, Myung Nam, David Hancock, Doug Ninneman, Mary Hanley, David Recinos, Sandy Henkin, Joe Roman, Myung Kang, Rodeny Tirey, Miyul Lee, and Elyse Whittaker.

The short involves nearly all the major Looney Tunes characters in roles from the film, including Bugs Bunny as Mr. Bugs, Daffy Duck as Sam Duck, Yosemite Sam as General Pandemonium, Tweety as Usmarte, Sylvester as Sylvester Slazo, Penelope Pussycat as Kitty (this short marks Penelope's first speaking role), and Pepé Le Pew as Captain Louis. Some characters use their real names, others the names of the characters in the original film, or parodic versions. Several minor Looney Tunes characters can be seen in the background (such as Pete Puma as a waiter wearing a kaftan and fez, Giovanni Jones and The Crusher as the maitre d' and doorman, Gossamer as a customer at a table, and Sam Sheepdog as General Pandemonium's driver assistant). Porky Pig was planned to have a speaking role in the short, but it was cut.

== Reception ==
Common Sense Media rated it 5 out of 5 stars.

== Home media ==
It was released on the DVD set "The Essential Bugs Bunny", as well as the special edition of Casablanca. It was later released on the Looney Tunes Parodies Collection DVD.

It is also a special feature on all HD DVD and Blu-ray releases of Casablanca, including the Blu-ray in its Ultra HD Blu-ray release. On some Blu-rays (including with the Ultra HD Blu-ray), it is at the end of the "Additional Footage" sub-menu in "Special Features", but in DVD quality.
