= Wild Over You =

- Directed by: Charles M. Jones
- Story by: Michael Maltese
- Starring: Mel Blanc
- Music by: Carl Stalling
- Animation by: Ben Washam; Lloyd Vaughan; Richard Thompson; Abe Levitow; Ken Harris
- Layouts by: Maurice Noble
- Backgrounds by: Philip DeGuard
- Color process: Technicolor
- Production company: Warner Bros. Cartoons
- Distributed by: Warner Bros. Pictures
- Release date: July 11, 1953
- Running time: 7:14
- Language: English

Wild Over You is a 1953 Warner Bros. Looney Tunes short animated film directed by Chuck Jones. The short was released on July 11, 1953, and stars Pepé Le Pew.

In this short, a wildcat escapes from a zoo in Paris and paints herself with black and white paint, which attracts an amorous and hopelessly romantic skunk, Pepé Le Pew, who mistakes her for another skunk. It is the first Pepé Le Pew cartoon to have Maurice Noble credited for layouts, and the first credited animation by Abe Levitow. The human characters and signage in the animation use Franglais to signal to an American audience that the cartoon takes place in France, with the heavily accented Pepé Le Pew resembling actor Charles Boyer.

== Plot ==
In the Paris Exposition of 1900, a colorful arrangement of tourists are guided around a zoo, but become panic-stricken when they find out that one of the animals, a wildcat, has escaped. The zookeeper yelled to sound the alarm and to the guests to evacuate the zoo. Elsewhere, the escapee wildcat stalks around the park. Seeing an animal controller from the zoo and his dog pursuing her, she spots some black and white paint nearby and paints herself to look like a skunk, scaring the animal controller and his dog off. Her black and white appearance, however, attracts the attention of Pepé Le Pew, who, after some flirting, receives a mauling for his effrontery, due to wildcats attacking victims that come too close to them. He shrugs it off, saying, "I like it" (this has caused the cartoon much controversy for implying sadomasochism). The wildcat hides inside a fortune teller's hut and Pepé, disguised as a swami, predicts to her that she will meet a fine gentleman. When she runs outside, Pepé is there already, disguised as said gentleman. He again receives a mauling from the wildcat, and incorrectly assumes, "Flirt".

Later on, Pepé (singing a variant of "Oh Dear! What Can the Matter Be?") wanders into a wax museum finding the wildcat posing as a boa around the neck of a wax sculpture of Marie Antoinette and he himself poses as a coonskin cap on a sculpture of Daniel Boone. The wildcat flees and hides inside a suit of armor with Pepé already in there ("Close quarters, no?"). A third mauling from the wildcat causes the parts of the suit to rearrange themselves, with a dazed Pepé saying to himself as he comes out, "I hope I hold out..." The wildcat then hides inside a replica of Madame Pompadour's carriage and Pepé is in there again. After a fourth mauling, he asks himself in a daze if all this abuse is worth it and answers the question himself by saying it was worth it.

The wildcat carries the chase outside, becoming more tired as Pepé pursues her. She comes by a hot air balloon, climbs inside and cuts the support ropes, launching the balloon into the air. Pepé appears beside her again and he receives one final mauling, taking a moment to sign off the cartoon with "If you have not tried it, do not knock it..." as the balloon floats upwards into the sky.
