= Louvre Come Back to Me! =

- Directed by: Chuck Jones; Maurice Noble
- Story by: John Dunn
- Starring: Mel Blanc; Julie Bennett (uncredited)
- Edited by: Treg Brown
- Music by: Milt Franklyn
- Animation by: Bob Bransford; Ken Harris; Tom Ray; Richard Thompson
- Backgrounds by: Phillip DeGuard; Tom O'Loughlin
- Color process: Technicolor
- Production company: Warner Bros. Cartoons
- Distributed by: Warner Bros. Pictures
- Release date: August 18, 1962
- Running time: 6:28
- Language: English

Louvre Come Back to Me! is a 1962 Warner Bros. Looney Tunes cartoon directed by Chuck Jones. The short was released on August 18, 1962, and stars Pepé Le Pew and Penelope Pussycat in their last cartoon of the "classic" Warner Bros. animation age.

== Plot ==
In Paris, Pepé Le Pew is strolling and causing a disturbance with his fumes. At one point Penelope Pussycat (here named Felice) is walking with a ginger cat named Pierre and Pepé's stink causes Pierre to faint and Penelope to spring into the air in shock, her back making contact with a fresh white-painted flagpole before she falls right into Pepé's arms. As Pepé introduces himself, Penelope scurries away.

Pepé chases Penelope into the Louvre, with Pierre following. Pepé's stench ruins a couple of sculptures (correcting one into the Venus de Milo) as well as thwarting Pierre's ambush attempt (who Pepé mistakes for a sculpture due to him turning white; the cat's teeth, whiskers, tail, and nose fall off, which, after briefly fleeing, he comes back to sweep up before slinking off again) and he terrifies Penelope in the sculpture gallery, even as he paints a picture of her ("Don't move, darling. I want to remember you just as you are."), she scurries away again and Pepé "accidentally" paints the dust cloud she left onto his picture ("Aw, shucks...You moved!").

Pierre then pumps himself with air in an attempt to simultaneously look strong and muscular and hold his breath while he confronts Pepé. Pepé plays along with the confrontation as a duel, miming a miss and a defeat. Pierre in the meantime slowly suffocates and finally, the air he fights very hard to hold in is forced out, launching himself into the Hall d'Armour and trapping himself in a suit of armor. Pepé wonders where everyone has gone to and after remarking that "War is fine, but love is better", he immediately picks up on where Penelope went.

Pepé finds Penelope hiding in the air conditioning machine below the Louvre and, thinking she had found a trysting place for them, traps her in it with himself. Pepé's fumes spread through the Louvre spoiling various works of art (the limp watches on Salvador Dalí's The Persistence of Memory turn erect and break while the head and insects pass out, the heads of the couple on Grant Wood's American Gothic retreat into their bodies in the manner of turtles, the person overseeing the workers on Jean-François Millet's The Gleaners shoots a starting pistol causing the workers to dash off like sprinters, and the color on Edgar Degas's Two Dancers falls off turning it into a paint-by-numbers picture), the cartoon ending with the fumes causing the Mona Lisa to talk. She breaks the fourth wall and says "I can tell you chaps one thing. It's not always easy to hold this smile."

== Crew ==
- Co-Director & Layouts: Maurice Noble
- Story: John Dunn
- Animation: Richard Thompson, Bob Bransford, Tom Ray & Ken Harris
- Backgrounds: Tom O'Loughlin & Philip DeGuard
- Film Editor: Treg Brown
- Voice Characterizations: Mel Blanc & Julie Bennett
- Music: Milt Franklyn
- Directed by Chuck Jones

== Home media ==
- VHS - The Looney Tunes Video Show Vol. 3
- DVD - Looney Tunes Super Stars' Pepe Le Pew: Zee Best of Zee Best
- DVD - Daffy Duck's Fantastic Island
- Blu-ray - Gay Purr-ee
