= Who Scent You? =

- Directed by: Chuck Jones
- Story by: Michael Maltese
- Starring: Mel Blanc
- Edited by: Treg Brown
- Music by: Milt Franklyn
- Animation by: Keith Darling; Ken Harris; Richard Thompson; Ben Washam
- Layouts by: Maurice Noble
- Backgrounds by: Philip DeGuard
- Color process: Technicolor
- Production company: Warner Bros. Cartoons
- Distributed by: Warner Bros. Pictures
- Release date: April 23, 1960 (US)
- Running time: 6:20
- Language: English

Who Scent You? is a 1960 Warner Bros. Looney Tunes cartoon directed by Chuck Jones. The short was released on April 23, 1960, and stars Pepé Le Pew and Penelope Pussycat.

== Plot ==
Penelope notices a luxurious ocean liner (the "Eel de France," a parody of the legendary French liner Ile de France) and wishes to go aboard, but the ticket collector will not permit her and tosses her away when she kisses his nose. As the ship begins to sail away, Penelope squeezes under a painted white fence, receiving a white stripe across her back. Penelope makes a running jump, catches one of the overhanging ropes and climbs aboard. Meanwhile, on the coast, Pepé Le Pew is taking a walk, singing "The Band Played On" and notices the passing liner. When he takes a closer look through binoculars he spots Penelope. Thinking she is a female skunk, the lovestruck Pepé runs across the seabed.

As Penelope clambers aboard, the entire crew and passengers evacuate the ship, spelling "LE PEW!" in the water, thinking that there is a skunk on board. Pepé then emerges dripping wet and finds Penelope. First he asks her for a date, but then immediately leaps on her and smooches her. Penelope wriggles free and runs off. Pepé heads to Beauty Salon and dries himself with a hair dryer puffing his fur up, but then he brushes himself. Pepé then rushes to Penelope and smooches her again and she wriggles and rushes off. Pepé chases Penelope wherever she goes until Penelope escapes on the lifeboat. But as Penelope watches the ghost ship drift away, Pepé emerges and Penelope runs off.

== Home media ==
- DVD - Looney Tunes Super Stars' Pepe Le Pew: Zee Best of Zee Best
- VHS - Pepe Le Pew's Skunk Tales
