= Spike the Bulldog and Chester the Terrier =

Warner Bros. theatrical cartoon characters

- Looney Tunes/Merrie Melodies characters
- First appearance: Tree for Two (1952)
- Created by: Friz Freleng
- Voiced by: Spike: Mel Blanc (1952-1983); Chester: Stan Freberg (1952-1996)

In-universe information
- Species: Spike: Dog (Bulldog); Chester: Dog (Terrier)
- Gender: Male

Spike the Bulldog and Chester the Terrier are animated cartoon characters in the Warner Bros. Looney Tunes and Merrie Melodies series of cartoons. Spike is a burly, gray bulldog wearing a red sweater, a brown bowler hat, and a perpetual scowl. Chester is a Jack Russell Terrier who is just the opposite, small and jumpy with yellow fur and brown, perky ears.

== History ==
The characters starred in only two shorts, both directed by animator Friz Freleng. The first of these films was Tree for Two (1952). In it, Chester tells his idol Spike that he knows of a cat that they can beat up. The cat is Freleng's own Sylvester, but every time Spike thinks he has the cat cornered, a runaway zoo black panther appears in Sylvester's place, thrashing the dog instead. When Chester decides to have a go of it, however, Sylvester finds himself at the little dog's mercy. By the cartoon's end, Spike and Chester have switched roles; Spike is the fawning sycophant, and Chester the smug prizefighter.

The characters' second outing was in the short film Dr. Jerkyl's Hide (1954). Spike (here called "Alfie" and with an English accent) is once again after Sylvester, only this time it is Sylvester himself who pummels the poor pooch, thanks to a potion that transforms him into a feline monster. Chester, of course, never sees this transformed Sylvester, thinking his buddy is being beaten by the tiny tomcat. The final loss of face for Alfie is his being thrashed by a fly that has also been affected by the potion, as it occurs in front of Chester's eyes.

== Later appearances ==
- They appear in Daffy Duck's Fantastic Island as part of the characters that visit the wishing well, where Spike wishes that Chester be as brave as him, after it happens in the events of Tree for Two.
- Spike and Chester appear in the movie Space Jam (1996). They are seen as a pair of paramedics during the basketball game, who take Stan Podolak away after he was flattened by the Monstars.
- Spike appears in The Looney Tunes Show episode "The Jailbird and Jailbunny". He is seen during the "Blow My Stack" song as a member of Yosemite Sam's anger management group.
- Chester appears in the Bugs Bunny Builders episode "Game Time".
- They are seen in the courtroom during the 2026 film Coyote vs. Acme.
