= Dr. Jerkyl's Hide =

- Title card
- Directed by: I. Freleng
- Story by: Warren Foster
- Starring: Mel Blanc; Stan Freberg
- Music by: Carl Stalling
- Animation by: Arthur Davis; Manuel Perez; Ken Champin; Virgil Ross
- Layouts by: Hawley Pratt
- Backgrounds by: Irv Wyner
- Color process: Technicolor
- Production company: Warner Bros. Cartoons
- Distributed by: Warner Bros. Pictures
- Release date: May 8, 1954
- Running time: 6:26
- Language: English

Dr. Jerkyl's Hide is a 1954 Warner Bros. Looney Tunes monster movie directed by Friz Freleng. The short was released on May 8, 1954, and stars Sylvester.

It is the first of three cartoons that Friz Freleng made based on Robert Louis Stevenson's 1886 novella Strange Case of Dr Jekyll and Mr Hyde, the others are Hyde and Hare (1955) and Hyde and Go Tweet (1960). This is the final appearance of the antagonistic canine duo Spike the Bulldog and Chester the Terrier (although Spike is named "Alfie" in this short) from the golden age of American animation; speaking with a British accent throughout.

This cartoon's plot follows the same formula as Tree for Two (1952), except that this time it is a Dr. Jekyll and Mr. Hyde parody, as opposed to a black panther that escaped from the zoo. Sylvester is trying to escape a pair of British dogs (Alfie the Bulldog and Chester the Terrier). He accidentally ingests Dr. Jekyll's formula (thinking it is soda pop), causing him to become a monster named Mr. Hyde. He terrorizes Alfie and causes Chester to call Alfie a coward.

== Plot ==
Alfie and Chester are walking down the street as Chester constantly asks Alfie what he wants them to do today. When Chester mentions chasing a cat, Alfie is interested. Then, they come across Sylvester the Cat until he wakes up to realize he is being confronted by the dogs. Sylvester panics and runs as he is being chased by the dogs until he takes refuge inside a place named after Dr. Jerkyl and Mr. Hyde. Out of breath, Sylvester accidentally ingests Dr. Jerkyl's formula, mistaking it for soda, which causes him to become a large, sinister and grotesque “Mr. Hyde” version of himself. Alfie enters the place, only to confront and be terrorized by the Hyde cat. Alfie comes out scared white as a confused Chester comes in to check the place out, only to find Sylvester, having turned back to normal.

Chester then encourages Alfie to continue with his pursuit of the cat. Sylvester hides inside a footlocker, only to be spotted by Alfie. Alfie coaxes Sylvester to come out, only to be confronted by him in his Hyde form again, leaving him completely scratched and falling apart into pieces literally once he comes out of the room. As Sylvester makes his way in, Alfie runs in fear while Chester has his back turned, but has no idea that Sylvester suddenly reverts to normal. When Sylvester tries to scare Chester away, he gets beaten and thrown away by Chester. Then, Chester forces Alfie at gunpoint to come back inside and confront the cat again before locking the door.

As Alfie panics, begging Chester to let him out, Sylvester escapes through the window. Relieved that the cat is gone, Alfie takes advantage of this by faking a fight to fool Chester, while throwing and smashing glass vessels. Then, Alfie throws the formula-bearing bottle, which breaks, showering drops onto a fly. The formula takes effect almost at once, creating a hideous fly monster who proceeds to thrash Alfie and throw him out of the place. When both dogs see the monster, it slams the door shut. In disgust at Alfie's cowardice, Chester slaps Alfie out of shame and calls him "yellow." The next day, Chester and Alfie are walking down the street with Chester wearing Alfie's former hat as Alfie constantly asks Chester what he wants them to do today, which earns him a slap in the face. Alfie breaks the fourth wall by telling the audience how brave and strong Chester is as his own hero.

== Cast ==
- Mel Blanc as Sylvester the Cat and Mr. Hyde
- Stan Freberg as Alfie and Chester

== Home media ==
This short is available on disc 1 of the Looney Tunes Collector's Vault: Volume 2 Blu-ray set.
