= Bugs 'n' Daffy =

Animated anthology television series

- Genre: Anthology
- Directed by: Tex Avery; Bob Clampett; Arthur Davis; Friz Freleng; Ken Harris; Chuck Jones; Rudy Larriva; Norman McCabe; Robert McKimson; Phil Monroe; Hawley Pratt; Frank Tashlin
- Theme music composer: Randy Rogel; Gordon Goodwin; Richard Stone
- Composers: Bernard Brown; Milt Franklyn; William Lava; Eugene Poddany; John Seely; Carl Stalling
- Country of origin: United States
- Original language: English
- No. of seasons: 2
- No. of episodes: 130 (list of episodes)

Production
- Executive producer: Kathleen Helppie-Shipley
- Running time: 30 minutes
- Production company: Warner Bros. Classic Animation

Original release
- Network: Kids' WB
- Release: September 11, 1995 – September 11, 1998

Bugs 'n' Daffy (formerly That's Warner Bros.!) is an American animated anthology television series that aired on The WB from 1995 to 1998 as part of their Kids' WB weekday lineup. The series featured cartoons from Warner Bros.' library of Looney Tunes and Merrie Melodies shorts. A weekly companion series, The Daffy Duck Show aired on Saturday mornings from 1996 to 1997.

This series is not to be confused with Cartoon Network's former block of Warner shorts, The Bugs & Daffy Show.

== History and format ==
That's Warner Bros.! premiered on September 11, 1995 as part of Kids' WB's inaugural season, on their weekday lineup alongside classic episodes of Animaniacs. The show's title sequence reused the opening for the Fox Kids version of Merrie Melodies Starring Bugs Bunny & Friends, now scored with a jazzy rendition of "Merrily We Roll Along" and with a different ending showing the show's title. 65 episodes were created featuring three cartoons in each, with a "Hip Clip" (a holdover from Merrie Melodies) placed in between the second and third shorts to fill up any remaining time. Unlike Merrie Melodies before it, not every episode featured a Bugs Bunny cartoon.

The following season, That's Warner Bros.! was renamed Bugs 'n' Daffy, which brought forth several changes to the format. Each show now began with a new title sequence set to an original theme song by Animaniacs composer Randy Rogel. In addition, the cartoons' staff credits were cut, leaving only a shot of their titles with a sting based on the theme song playing underneath them. Other than these changes, the contents of the original 65 episodes remained mostly the same.

For the 1997–98 season, a new set of 65 episodes were created. Thanks to Time Warner's merger with Turner Broadcasting System on October 10, 1996, Warner Bros. had regained the broadcast rights to Turner's package of color Looney Tunes and Merrie Melodies made before August 1948; at least one cartoon from the pre-1948 package was included in each episode (though some aired on The Daffy Duck Show first). Because of the lengths of those shorts, not every episode featured a "Hip Clip".

Bugs 'n' Daffy was removed from the Kids' WB lineup at the start of the 1998–99 season, although some affiliates were allowed to air the series as a replacement for Tiny Toon Adventures.

=== The Daffy Duck Show ===
On November 23, 1996, a companion series titled The Daffy Duck Show began airing on Kids' WB's Saturday morning lineup as a replacement for the low-rated Freakazoid! Each episode featured two Daffy Duck cartoons, with one featuring another character in between them. 13 episodes of The Daffy Duck Show were created, airing weekly until the start of the 1997–98 season.

== Episodes ==
=== Season 1 (1995/1996) ===
- Cartoons marked with an asterisk (*) are black-and-white cartoons that have been computer-colorized.
- When That's Warner Bros.! became Bugs 'n' Daffy for the 1996–97 season, The Bee-Deviled Bruin was removed from episodes 24 and 54, presumably due to its violent content, and replaced with Beanstalk Bunny and What's Up, Doc?, respectively.

No.	1st cartoon	2nd cartoon	3rd cartoon	Original air date
1	One Froggy Evening	Ballot Box Bunny	A Broken Leghorn	September 11, 1995
2	Backwoods Bunny	Daffy Duck Hunt	Feed the Kitty	September 12, 1995
3	Curtain Razor	No Barking	Bear Feat	September 13, 1995
4	Beanstalk Bunny	Mixed Master	Lumber Jerks	September 14, 1995
5	Lovelorn Leghorn	Birds of a Father	What's Up, Doc?	September 15, 1995
6	Rabbit of Seville	Bad Ol' Putty Tat	A Waggily Tale	September 18, 1995
7	Boobs in the Woods	The EGGcited Rooster	Much Ado About Nutting	September 19, 1995
8	Yankee Doodle Bugs	Martian Through Georgia	Fowl Weather	September 20, 1995
9	Often an Orphan	From A to Z-Z-Z-Z	A Star is Bored	September 21, 1995
10	Bugs' Bonnets	Canary Row	The Mouse on 57th Street	September 22, 1995
11	Gift Wrapped	Aqua Duck	Barbary Coast Bunny	September 25, 1995
12	Lighter Than Hare	Chicken Jitters*	Greedy for Tweety	September 26, 1995
13	Mississippi Hare	Weasel Stop	The Stupor Salesman	September 27, 1995
14	The Wearing of the Grin	Easy Peckins	Home Tweet Home	September 28, 1995
15	Scaredy Cat	Cat Feud	Portrait of the Artist as a Young Bunny	September 29, 1995
16	Wild and Woolly Hare	Hippety Hopper	I Gopher You	October 2, 1995
17	Fool Coverage	Nelly's Folly	Prince Varmint	October 3, 1995
18	Rabbit's Feat	Cheese Chasers	A Kiddie's Kitty	October 4, 1995
19	Duck Dodgers in the 24½th Century	Feather Dusted	A Street Cat Named Sylvester	October 5, 1995
20	From Hare to Heir	Daffy's Inn Trouble	Stooge for a Mouse	October 6, 1995
21	A Witch's Tangled Hare	Mouse Mazurka	Claws for Alarm	October 9, 1995
22	Robin Hood Daffy	Bartholomew Versus the Wheel	Rabbit Every Monday	October 10, 1995
23	Bedeviled Rabbit	Muzzle Tough	Road to Andalay	October 11, 1995
24	Bye, Bye Bluebeard	Fast Buck Duck	The Bee-Deviled Bruin	October 12, 1995
25	Henhouse Henery	Mouse-Placed Kitten	Big Top Bunny	October 13, 1995
26	Bill of Hare	Cheese It, the Cat!	Snow Business	October 16, 1995
27	Paying the Piper	Hoppy Go Lucky	To Itch His Own	October 17, 1995
28	Hare-Way to the Stars	Go Fly a Kit	Bear Feat	October 18, 1995
29	Goldimouse and the Three Cats	Thumb Fun	Southern Fried Rabbit	October 19, 1995
30	Bully for Bugs	Gone Batty	Naughty Neighbors*	October 20, 1995
31	One Froggy Evening	It's Nice to Have a Mouse Around the House	Banty Raids	October 23, 1995
32	Crockett-Doodle-Do	The Turn-Tale Wolf	Rabbit's Kin	October 24, 1995
33	Putty Tat Trouble	Goo Goo Goliath	The Iceman Ducketh	October 25, 1995
34	Wild and Woolly Hare	Ducking the Devil	The Pest That Came to Dinner	October 26, 1995
35	Hyde and Hare	A Broken Leghorn	Too Hop to Handle	October 27, 1995
36	False Hare	Porky's Prize Pony*	The Lion's Busy	October 30, 1995
37	A-Haunting We Will Go	Fox-Terror	Knights Must Fall	October 31, 1995
38	Don't Axe Me	Dog Tales	Satan's Waitin'	November 1, 1995
39	Dr. Devil and Mr. Hare	Cats and Bruises	Porky's Romance*	November 2, 1995
40	Dough for the Do-Do	There Auto Be a Law	Rabbit Romeo	November 3, 1995
41	Bugsy and Mugsy	The Stupor Salesman	Catty Cornered	November 6, 1995
42	Mother Was a Rooster	The Unexpected Pest	Hot Cross Bunny	November 7, 1995
43	The Wearing of the Grin	The Dixie Fryer	Strife with Father	November 8, 1995
44	The Slap-Hoppy Mouse	A Peck o' Trouble	A Star is Bored	November 9, 1995
45	The Unmentionables	Dough for the Do-Do	Ant Pasted	November 10, 1995
46	Rebel Rabbit	High Note	Scaredy Cat	November 13, 1995
47	Tree Cornered Tweety	The Henpecked Duck*	Rabbit's Feat	November 14, 1995
48	Rabbit Every Monday	Wild Wild World	Boobs in the Woods	November 15, 1995
49	Good Noose	Each Dawn I Crow	Mississippi Hare	November 16, 1995
50	Hot Cross Bunny	The Jet Cage	It's Hummer Time	November 17, 1995
51	Raw! Raw! Rooster!	Kiddin' the Kitten	Now Hare This	November 20, 1995
52	Lighthouse Mouse	Plane Dippy*	Crockett-Doodle-Do	November 21, 1995
53	Bully for Bugs	Puss n' Booty*	Corn Plastered	November 22, 1995
54	Duck Dodgers in the 24½th Century	The Pied Piper of Guadalupe	The Bee-Deviled Bruin	November 23, 1995
55	Dog Pounded	Corn on the Cop	Bedeviled Rabbit	November 24, 1995
56	Bunker Hill Bunny	Greedy for Tweety	Porky's Cafe*	November 27, 1995
57	Robin Hood Daffy	Rocket-bye Baby	Hare-Way to the Stars	November 28, 1995
58	Tweet and Sour	Don't Axe Me	Sleepy Time Possum	November 29, 1995
59	Knights Must Fall	The Film Fan*	Tease for Two	November 30, 1995
60	Little Red Rodent Hood	The Yolk's on You	Cat Feud	December 1, 1995
61	Wideo Wabbit	Tweety's S.O.S.	Strangled Eggs	December 4, 1995
62	Thumb Fun	Rebel Without Claws	Dr. Devil and Mr. Hare	December 5, 1995
63	Duck Amuck	A Fox in a Fix	Claws for Alarm	December 6, 1995
64	Spaced Out Bunny	Pop 'im Pop!	Suppressed Duck	December 7, 1995
65	Southern Fried Rabbit	A Bone for a Bone	Putty Tat Trouble	December 8, 1995

=== Season 2 (1997) ===
- Cartoons marked with an asterisk (*) are black-and-white cartoons that have been computer-colorized.

No.	1st cartoon	2nd cartoon	3rd cartoon	Original air date
1	Rebel Rabbit	The Draft Horse	High Note	September 8, 1997
2	A Pest in the House	Gift Wrapped	Rabbit Every Monday	September 9, 1997
3	Fox-Terror	The Jet Cage	Hair-Raising Hare	September 10, 1997
4	What's Up, Doc?	The Goofy Gophers	No Barking	September 11, 1997
5	What Makes Daffy Duck	Rocket-bye Baby	One Froggy Evening	September 12, 1997
6	Fool Coverage	Hare-Way to the Stars	The Old Grey Hare	September 15, 1997
7	Rabbit's Kin	Mouse-Placed Kitten	Little Orphan Airedale	September 16, 1997
8	The Big Snooze	The Mouse on 57th Street	Often an Orphan	September 17, 1997
9	Daffy Duck and Egghead	Putty Tat Trouble	From Hare to Heir	September 18, 1997
10	Rabbit Romeo	The Night Watchman	From A to Z-Z-Z-Z	September 19, 1997
11	Paying the Piper	The Heckling Hare	The Unexpected Pest	September 22, 1997
12	Mississippi Hare	Kiddin' the Kitten	The Mouse-Merized Cat	September 23, 1997
13	Hyde and Hare	Goo Goo Goliath	Hare Trigger	September 24, 1997
14	Elmer's Candid Camera	Ducking the Devil	Birds of a Father	September 25, 1997
15	Walky Talky Hawky	A Star is Bored	Rabbit of Seville	September 26, 1997
16	The EGGcited Rooster	Hold the Lion, Please!	Muzzle Tough	September 29, 1997
17	A Hare Grows in Manhattan	A-Haunting We Will Go	The Stupor Salesman	September 30, 1997
18	The Wabbit Who Came to Supper	Rebel Without Claws	Raw! Raw! Rooster!	October 1, 1997
19	The Wild Hare	Martian Through Georgia	Mother Was a Rooster	October 2, 1997
20	Daffy Duck Hunt	Confederate Honey	Wideo Wabbit	October 3, 1997
21	Odor-able Kitty	I Gopher You	Duck Dodgers in the 24½th Century	October 6, 1997
22	Don't Axe Me	Thugs with Dirty Mugs	Feather Dusted	October 7, 1997
23	Knights Must Fall	Home Tweet Home	The Hep Cat	October 8, 1997
24	Rabbit's Feat	(Blooper) Bunny	The Iceman Ducketh	October 9, 1997
25	Often an Orphan	A Bone for a Bone	Bugs Bunny Rides Again	October 10, 1997
26	Pop 'im Pop!	Bunker Hill Bunny	Kitty Kornered	October 13, 1997
27	Lovelorn Leghorn	The Crackpot Quail	Daffy's Inn Trouble	October 14, 1997
28	Goldimouse and the Three Cats	The Unruly Hare	Henhouse Henery	October 15, 1997
29	The Aristo-Cat	Crockett-Doodle-Do	Bugsy and Mugsy	October 16, 1997
30	Hare Ribbin'	Greedy for Tweety	Lighthouse Mouse	October 17, 1997
31	Road to Andalay	Good Night, Elmer	The Henpecked Duck*	October 20, 1997
32	Wackiki Wabbit	Tweety's S.O.S.	The Slap-Hoppy Mouse	October 21, 1997
33	Cat Feud	Ant Pasted	Tortoise Wins by a Hare	October 22, 1997
34	Hare Conditioned	Cats and Bruises	Ducking the Devil	October 23, 1997
35	Greetings Bait	Each Dawn I Crow	Fast Buck Duck	October 24, 1997
36	Trap-Happy Porky	The Unmentionables	Plane Dippy*	October 27, 1997
37	Corn Plastered	Naughty Neighbors*	Stage Door Cartoon	October 28, 1997
38	Southern Fried Rabbit	Hoppy Go Lucky	Hare Tonic	October 29, 1997
39	Too Hop to Handle	Hollywood Steps Out	Hot Cross Bunny	October 30, 1997
40	A Tale of Two Mice	A Fox in a Fix	Robin Hood Daffy	October 31, 1997
41	Rabbit Punch	Bedeviled Rabbit	Boobs in the Woods	November 3, 1997
42	A Broken Leghorn	Bugs Bunny Gets the Boid	Thumb Fun	November 4, 1997
43	Suppressed Duck	Fowl Weather	Racketeer Rabbit	November 5, 1997
44	Snow Business	A Waggily Tale	Rabbit Transit	November 6, 1997
45	Back Alley Oproar	The Film Fan*	Duck Amuck	November 7, 1997
46	Dog Pounded	Porky's Cafe*	The Wacky Wabbit	November 10, 1997
47	Bad Ol' Putty Tat	Doggone Cats	Aqua Duck	November 11, 1997
48	Tweetie Pie	Lumber Jerks	Barbary Coast Bunny	November 12, 1997
49	False Hare	Sniffles and the Bookworm	Scaredy Cat	November 13, 1997
50	Weasel Stop	Canary Row	Tortoise Beats Hare	November 14, 1997
51	Catch as Cats Can	Tweet and Sour	It's Nice to Have a Mouse Around the House	November 17, 1997
52	Crowing Pains	Bye, Bye Bluebeard	Beanstalk Bunny	November 18, 1997
53	Easy Peckins	Cheese It, the Cat!	Wabbit Twouble	November 19, 1997
54	Hippety Hopper	The Dixie Fryer	Buccaneer Bunny	November 20, 1997
55	The Hare-Brained Hypnotist	Tree Cornered Tweety	Little Red Rodent Hood	November 21, 1997
56	A Street Cat Named Sylvester	The Turn-Tale Wolf	Fresh Hare	November 24, 1997
57	Strangled Eggs	A Witch's Tangled Hare	Rhapsody Rabbit	November 25, 1997
58	Hare Remover	Boobs in the Woods	Suppressed Duck	November 26, 1997
59	Hare Force	Cheese Chasers	The Stupor Salesman	November 27, 1997
60	High Note	Falling Hare	Birds of a Father	November 28, 1997
61	Claws for Alarm	The Pied Piper of Guadalupe	Elmer's Pet Rabbit	December 1, 1997
62	A Tale of Two Kitties	Ballot Box Bunny	Lighthouse Mouse	December 2, 1997
63	Dr. Devil and Mr. Hare	The Squawkin' Hawk	Dough for the Do-Do	December 3, 1997
64	Banty Raids	Stooge for a Mouse	Along Came Daffy	December 4, 1997
65	Wild and Woolly Hare	Catty Cornered	Pigs in a Polka	December 5, 1997

=== The Daffy Duck Show ===
- Cartoons marked with an asterisk (*) are black-and-white cartoons that have been computer-colorized.

No.	1st cartoon	2nd cartoon	3rd cartoon	Original air date
1	Duck Dodgers in the 24½th Century	Suppressed Duck	Robin Hood Daffy	November 23, 1996
2	The Stupor Salesman	Often an Orphan	Daffy's Inn Trouble	November 30, 1996
3	Daffy Duck Hunt	Cheese Chasers	Fast Buck Duck	December 7, 1996
4	Fool Coverage	A Street Cat Named Sylvester	Ducking the Devil	December 14, 1996
5	Don't Axe Me	The Lion's Busy	The Henpecked Duck*	December 21, 1996
6	Boobs in the Woods	Gift Wrapped	Tease for Two	December 28, 1996
7	Thumb Fun	Mouse Mazurka	Good Noose	January 4, 1997
8	Duck Amuck	One Froggy Evening	Corn on the Cop	January 11, 1997
9	Aqua Duck	Lovelorn Leghorn	The Yolk's on You	January 18, 1997
10	Hollywood Daffy	Ant Pasted	To Duck or Not to Duck	January 25, 1997
11	Yankee Doodle Daffy	Dog Pounded	The Great Piggy Bank Robbery	February 1, 1997
12	Daffy Duck Slept Here	Putty Tat Trouble	Birth of a Notion	February 8, 1997
13	Draftee Daffy	Claws for Alarm	Book Revue	February 15, 1997
