= Merrie Melodies Starring Bugs Bunny & Friends =

- Genre: Anthology
- Directed by: Tex Avery; Bob Clampett; Arthur Davis; Friz Freleng; Ken Harris; Chuck Jones; Rudy Larriva; Norman McCabe; Robert McKimson; Phil Monroe; Frank Tashlin; Richard Thompson
- Voices of: Mel Blanc; June Foray; Arthur Q. Bryan
- Theme music composer: George Daugherty (first opening); Mark Watters (second opening)
- Composers: Milt Franklyn; William Lava; Eugene Poddany; John Seely; Carl Stalling
- Country of origin: United States
- Original language: English
- No. of seasons: 1
- No. of episodes: 65

Production
- Running time: 30 minutes
- Production companies: Warner Bros. Animation; Warner Bros. Domestic Television Distribution

Original release
- Network: Syndication (1990–92); Fox Kids (1992–94)
- Release: September 17, 1990 – September 9, 1994

Merrie Melodies Starring Bugs Bunny & Friends is an animated anthology television series that aired weekdays in syndication from 1990 to 1992 and on the Fox Kids Network from 1992 to 1994. Originally made to coincide with Bugs Bunny's 50th birthday and the debut of Tiny Toon Adventures, the series featured cartoons from the Looney Tunes and Merrie Melodies library and was distributed by Warner Bros. Domestic Television Distribution.

This series is not to be confused with Warners' earlier syndicated anthology The Merrie Melodies Show.

== Format ==
For the syndicated version of the series, each episode began with a title sequence, directed by Darrell Van Citters, featuring Bugs Bunny and Daffy Duck showing classic cartoon clips on a screen; as usual, Daffy would try to butt in on the action, only for some humorous setback to befall him (five different setups were made, one for each weekday). The show itself ran for a half-hour and contained three classic shorts, one of them starring Bugs Bunny, with a short "Hip Clip" placed in between the second and third shorts. 65 episodes of Merrie Melodies were created and aired in first-run syndication from September 17 to December 14, 1990; reruns aired from then until 1992.

Merrie Melodies moved to the Fox Kids Network on September 14, 1992, which brought forth several changes to the format. A new animated opening was produced featuring Bugs oversleeping and making a frantic run through the Warner Bros. Studios, passing by several Looney Tunes characters as he makes his way to a soundstage.

== Episodes ==
=== Season 1 ===
- An asterisk (*) denotes a black-and-white cartoon that was computer-colorized.

| No. | 1st cartoon | 2nd cartoon | 3rd cartoon | Original air date |
|---|---|---|---|---|
| 1 | High Diving Hare | Claws for Alarm | Fast and Furry-ous | September 17, 1990 |
| 2 | Often an Orphan | Mouse Wreckers | The Hasty Hare | September 18, 1990 |
| 3 | Bully for Bugs | Tweet and Sour | Henhouse Henery | September 19, 1990 |
| 4 | The Scarlet Pumpernickel | My Bunny Lies Over the Sea | One Froggy Evening | September 20, 1990 |
| 5 | From A to Z-Z-Z-Z | Gee Whiz-z-z-z-z-z-z | Hillbilly Hare | September 21, 1990 |
| 6 | Mutiny on the Bunny | Deduce, You Say | Much Ado About Nutting | September 24, 1990 |
| 7 | Mouse-Taken Identity | Rabbit Fire | To Beep or Not to Beep | September 25, 1990 |
| 8 | Frigid Hare | Kiss Me Cat | Dog Collared | September 26, 1990 |
| 9 | Bill of Hare | Lovelorn Leghorn | The Hypo-Chondri-Cat | September 27, 1990 |
| 10 | Daffy Dilly | Stooge for a Mouse | What's Opera, Doc? | September 28, 1990 |
| 11 | Roman Legion-Hare | Golden Yeggs | Scaredy Cat | October 1, 1990 |
| 12 | Little Boy Boo | Dough Ray Me-Ow | Show Biz Bugs | October 2, 1990 |
| 13 | Transylvania 6-5000 | Bear Feat | Zip 'N Snort | October 3, 1990 |
| 14 | Curtain Razor | Weasel While You Work | Bugs and Thugs | October 4, 1990 |
| 15 | Robot Rabbit | Dog Gone South | Putty Tat Trouble | October 5, 1990 |
| 16 | Duck! Rabbit, Duck! | Zoom at the Top | Wild Wild World | October 8, 1990 |
| 17 | The Slap-Hoppy Mouse | Wholly Smoke* | Sahara Hare | October 9, 1990 |
| 18 | Stork Naked | Feline Frame-Up | His Hare-Raising Tale | October 10, 1990 |
| 19 | Broom-Stick Bunny | A Sheep in the Deep | Jeepers Creepers* | October 11, 1990 |
| 20 | Feather Dusted | Ready, Set, Zoom! | Rabbit's Kin | October 12, 1990 |
| 21 | A Star is Bored | An Egg Scramble | Yankee Dood It | October 15, 1990 |
| 22 | Stupor Duck | Spaced Out Bunny | Caveman Inki | October 16, 1990 |
| 23 | Strife with Father | Highway Runnery | Rabbit Romeo | October 17, 1990 |
| 24 | The Iceman Ducketh | Of Rice and Hen | Porky Pig's Feat* | October 18, 1990 |
| 25 | I Gopher You | Bowery Bugs | Snow Business | October 19, 1990 |
| 26 | Ballot Box Bunny | Boulder Wham! | Gone Batty | October 22, 1990 |
| 27 | Riff Raffy Daffy | Apes of Wrath | Dime to Retire | October 23, 1990 |
| 28 | Strangled Eggs | A Fox in a Fix | Person to Bunny | October 24, 1990 |
| 29 | Baby Buggy Bunny | Out and Out Rout | Pappy's Puppy | October 25, 1990 |
| 30 | A Bear for Punishment | Porky's Pooch* | This is a Life? | October 26, 1990 |
| 31 | Wild and Woolly Hare | Bell Hoppy | Rocket Squad | October 29, 1990 |
| 32 | Quack Shot | Captain Hareblower | The Leghorn Blows at Midnight | October 30, 1990 |
| 33 | Tom Tom Tomcat | Whoa, Be-Gone! | The Hasty Hare | October 31, 1990 |
| 34 | The Prize Pest | Bewitched Bunny | The Mouse That Jack Built | November 1, 1990 |
| 35 | Cracked Quack | Roman Legion-Hare | Kiddin' the Kitten | November 2, 1990 |
| 36 | Rabbit Seasoning | Stop! Look! And Hasten! | The Honey-Mousers | November 5, 1990 |
| 37 | A Fractured Leghorn | Paying the Piper | My Bunny Lies Over the Sea | November 6, 1990 |
| 38 | The Super Snooper | Portrait of the Artist as a Young Bunny | Goo Goo Goliath | November 7, 1990 |
| 39 | To Hare is Human | The Ducksters | Go Fly a Kit | November 8, 1990 |
| 40 | Little Red Rodent Hood | Shot and Bothered | Ballot Box Bunny | November 9, 1990 |
| 41 | Southern Fried Rabbit | Double or Mutton | Crockett-Doodle-Do | November 12, 1990 |
| 42 | Greedy for Tweety | Gopher Broke | Hillbilly Hare | November 13, 1990 |
| 43 | False Hare | Beep Prepared | Chow Hound | November 14, 1990 |
| 44 | Boston Quackie | Bill of Hare | Porky's Duck Hunt* | November 15, 1990 |
| 45 | Big House Bunny | Rocket-bye Baby | A Coy Decoy* | November 16, 1990 |
| 46 | Bonanza Bunny | Chaser on the Rocks | Cats A-Weigh! | November 19, 1990 |
| 47 | You Were Never Duckier | The Unmentionables | Early to Bet | November 20, 1990 |
| 48 | Pop 'im Pop | Frigid Hare | Bugged by a Bee | November 21, 1990 |
| 49 | Horse Hare | Porky's Bear Facts* | A Hound for Trouble | November 22, 1990 |
| 50 | Rebel Rabbit | Run, Run, Sweet Road Runner | The EGGcited Rooster | November 23, 1990 |
| 51 | Barbary Coast Bunny | Lickety-Splat | Sleepy Time Possum | November 26, 1990 |
| 52 | The Foghorn Leghorn | Porky's Midnight Matinee* | A Star is Bored | November 27, 1990 |
| 53 | Tweet Zoo | Wideo Wabbit | Don't Give Up the Sheep | November 28, 1990 |
| 54 | People Are Bunny | War and Pieces | The Bee-Deviled Bruin | November 29, 1990 |
| 55 | The Daffy Duckaroo* | Sock-a-Doodle-Do | Lighter Than Hare | November 30, 1990 |
| 56 | Bugs Bunny's Christmas Carol | Raw! Raw! Rooster! | Just Plane Beep | December 3, 1990 |
| 57 | Freudy Cat | Baby Buggy Bunny | The Lion's Busy | December 4, 1990 |
| 58 | Bushy Hare | Porky & Daffy* | Cheese It, the Cat! | December 5, 1990 |
| 59 | The Slick Chick | Apes of Wrath | Puss n' Booty* | December 6, 1990 |
| 60 | Wise Quackers | Clippety Clobbered | The Windblown Hare | December 7, 1990 |
| 61 | 14 Carrot Rabbit | The Pest That Came to Dinner | Tired and Feathered | December 10, 1990 |
| 62 | The High and the Flighty | Two's a Crowd | A-Lad-In His Lamp | December 11, 1990 |
| 63 | The Dixie Fryer | Prince Varmint | Mouse Warming | December 12, 1990 |
| 64 | Rebel Without Claws | Woolen Under Where | Rabbit Seasoning | December 13, 1990 |
| 65 | Hare-Abian Nights | To Itch His Own | Bye, Bye Bluebeard | December 14, 1990 |
