= The Merrie Melodies Show =

- Genre: Anthology
- Directed by: Robert McKimson; Chuck Jones; Friz Freleng; Alex Lovy
- Voices of: Mel Blanc; Larry Storch; Pat Woodell
- Composers: William Lava; Milt Franklyn; Carl Stalling
- Country of origin: United States
- Original language: English
- No. of seasons: 1
- No. of episodes: 24

Production
- Producer: Bill L. Hendricks
- Running time: 30 minutes
- Production company: Warner Bros. Television

Original release
- Network: Syndication
- Release: 1972

The Merrie Melodies Show was an animated anthology television series released to syndication by Warner Bros. Television in 1972. Each half-hour episode featured three shorts from the Looney Tunes and Merrie Melodies library, primarily those produced after 1960 and featuring Speedy Gonzales, Sylvester and Daffy Duck.

This series is not to be confused with the Warners' later syndicated anthology Merrie Melodies Starring Bugs Bunny & Friends.

== Episodes ==
| No. | 1st cartoon | 2nd cartoon | 3rd cartoon |
|---|---|---|---|
| 1 | Mexican Cat Dance | Daffy's Inn Trouble | The Pied Piper of Guadalupe |
| 2 | Mexican Boarders | Dog Gone People | Swing Ding Amigo |
| 3 | Nuts and Volts | Honey's Money | Daffy's Diner |
| 4 | Road to Andalay | A Scent of the Matterhorn | Skyscraper Caper |
| 5 | Mucho Locos | Freudy Cat | Bugged by a Bee |
| 6 | The Music Mice-Tro | Martian Through Georgia | Injun Trouble |
| 7 | A Squeak in the Deep | Suppressed Duck | Señorella and the Glass Huarache |
| 8 | It's Nice to Have a Mouse Around the House | Snow Excuse | Merlin the Magic Mouse |
| 9 | Rodent to Stardom | D' Fightin' Ones | Corn Plastered |
| 10 | Fiesta Fiasco | Good Noose | Cool Cat |
| 11 | See Ya Later Gladiator | Birds Anonymous | Chimp and Zee |
| 12 | Speedy Ghost to Town | Crows' Feat | Hocus Pocus Powwow |
| 13 | Mexican Mousepiece | Tease for Two | I Was a Teenage Thumb |
| 14 | Assault and Peppered | The Last Hungry Cat | Hippydrome Tiger |
| 15 | A-Haunting We Will Go | The Spy Swatter | Rabbit Stew and Rabbits Too |
| 16 | Pancho's Hideaway | Go Away Stowaway | Shamrock and Roll |
| 17 | Feather Finger | Corn on the Cop | 3 Ring Wing Ding |
| 18 | Moby Duck | Rebel Without Claws | The Great Carrot Train Robbery |
| 19 | A Message to Gracias | Quacker Tracker | Fistic Mystic |
| 20 | Go Go Amigo | A Taste of Catnip | Flying Circus |
| 21 | Chili Corn Corny | Bartholomew Versus the Wheel | Big Game Haunt |
| 22 | Daffy Rents | Nelly's Folly | Bunny and Claude |
| 23 | The Astroduck | Banty Raids | Feud with a Dude |
| 24 | Well Worn Daffy | Aqua Duck | Louvre Come Back to Me! |
