= Quackodile Tears =

- Directed by: Art Davis
- Story by: John Dunn; Carl Kohler
- Produced by: David H. DePatie; William Orcutt
- Starring: Mel Blanc (all other voices); June Foray (Honeybunch)
- Edited by: Treg Brown
- Music by: Milt Franklyn
- Animation by: Gerry Chiniquy; Virgil Ross; Bob Matz; Lee Halpern; Art Leonardi
- Layouts by: Robert Gribbroek
- Backgrounds by: Tom O'Loughlin
- Color process: Technicolor
- Production company: Warner Bros. Cartoons
- Distributed by: Warner Bros. Pictures; Vitaphone
- Release date: March 31, 1962
- Running time: 6 minutes
- Language: English

Quackodile Tears is a 1962 Warner Bros. Merrie Melodies cartoon directed by Arthur Davis, during his spare time while working at Hanna-Barbera. The short was released on March 31, 1962, and stars Daffy Duck. The title is a pun on the phrase "crocodile tears".

In the film, Daffy has to take care of the egg in his nest. He loses the egg, and unwittingly replaces it with the egg of an alligator. Resulting in conflict with the father of that egg.

== Plot ==
Honeybunch is sitting on an egg in her nest and knitting. She tells Daffy that it's his turn to sit, but he refuses until she kicks his butt. He moves the egg for a moment to fluff up the nest, but the egg rolls away down the hill and into another nest full of eggs. Unbeknownst to him, these are alligator eggs. Unable to tell the difference, Daffy picks an egg at random and brings it back to his nest. The mother alligator sees him take an egg and cries out, and the father alligator chases Daffy. They squabble about the egg back and forth for a while until Honeybunch returns.

At one point, Daffy uses a grenade painted white as a trap for the alligator. Honeybunch mistakes it as Daffy throwing away their egg, so she strangles Daffy and forces him to sit on that "egg", ignoring Daffy's explanation that it is a grenade, not the real egg. It explodes, setting his tail on fire.

She makes him sit on the real egg until it hatches into a baby alligator. And when Daffy starts clobbering the alligator with a bat, she tells her husband it's just an ugly duckling which will grow into a beautiful swan. Meanwhile, Mrs. Alligator tells her husband something similar, since both families had swapped eggs.

== Home media ==
This short is available on disc 1 of the Looney Tunes Collector's Vault: Volume 1 Blu-ray set.

Preceded by Daffy's Inn Trouble	Daffy Duck Cartoons; 1962	Succeeded by Good Noose
