= Looney Tunes Super Stars' Daffy Duck: Frustrated Fowl =

2010 American DVD

Daffy Duck: Frustrated Fowl
- DVD cover
- Directed by: Robert Clampett; Friz Freleng; Chuck Jones; Robert McKimson; Phil Monroe; Frank Tashlin
- Produced by: John W. Burton; David H. DePatie; Leon Schlesinger; Eddie Selzer
- Starring: Mel Blanc (voice)
- Distributed by: Warner Home Video
- Release date: August 10, 2010 (United States)
- Running time: 125 minutes
- Country: United States
- Language: English

Looney Tunes Super Stars' Daffy Duck: Frustrated Fowl is a DVD of 15 new-to-DVD Daffy Duck cartoons that was released on August 10, 2010.

== Contents ==
All cartoons on this disc star Daffy Duck.

#	Title	Co-stars	Year	Director	Series
1	Tick Tock Tuckered	Porky	1944	Bob Clampett	LT
2	Nasty Quacks		1945	Frank Tashlin	MM
3	Daffy Dilly		1948	Chuck Jones	MM
4	Wise Quackers	Elmer	1949	Friz Freleng	LT
5	The Prize Pest	Porky	1951	Robert McKimson	LT
6	Design for Leaving (Note: Cropped to widescreen)	Elmer	1954	Robert McKimson	LT
7	Stork Naked		1955	Friz Freleng	MM
8	This Is a Life?	Bugs, Elmer, Granny, Sam	1955	Friz Freleng	MM
9	Dime to Retire	Porky	1955	Robert McKimson	LT
10	Ducking the Devil	Taz	1957	Robert McKimson	MM
11	People Are Bunny	Bugs	1959	Robert McKimson	MM
12	Person to Bunny	Bugs, Elmer	1960	Friz Freleng	MM
13	Daffy's Inn Trouble	Porky	1961	Robert McKimson	LT
14	The Iceman Ducketh	Bugs	1964	Phil Monroe	LT
15	Suppressed Duck		1965	Robert McKimson	LT

== Controversies ==
One of the initial Looney Tunes Super Stars releases, this collection featured a majority of cartoons from the post-1953 era..., but in a 1:85 widescreen format. According to Warner Bros., the reason for this format was that post-1953 cartoons were originally presented in widescreen in theaters, a decision that disappointed many collectors, as the cartoons were originally filmed in the Academy full-screen ratio.

In 2011, Ducking the Devil was restored and re-released in its original 4:3 aspect ratio as part of the Looney Tunes Platinum Collection: Volume 1 Blu-Ray and DVD set. In 2020, three classic cartoons—This Is a Life?, Person to Bunny, and People Are Bunny—were re-released as part of the Bugs Bunny 80th Anniversary Collection Blu-Ray set, once again presented in their original 4:3 aspect ratios. Stork Naked was re-released in its correct 4:3 aspect ratio as part of the Looney Tunes Collector's Choice: Volume 4 Blu-Ray set in 2024. The Iceman Ducketh was re-released in its correct 4:3 aspect ratio on the Dear Heart Blu-ray in 2026.

As of 2026, four cartoons on the Frustrated Fowl DVD - Design for Leaving, Dime to Retire, Daffy's Inn Trouble, and Suppressed Duck - have yet to be re-released on physical media in their correct 4:3 aspect ratios.
