= A Broken Leghorn =

1959 film

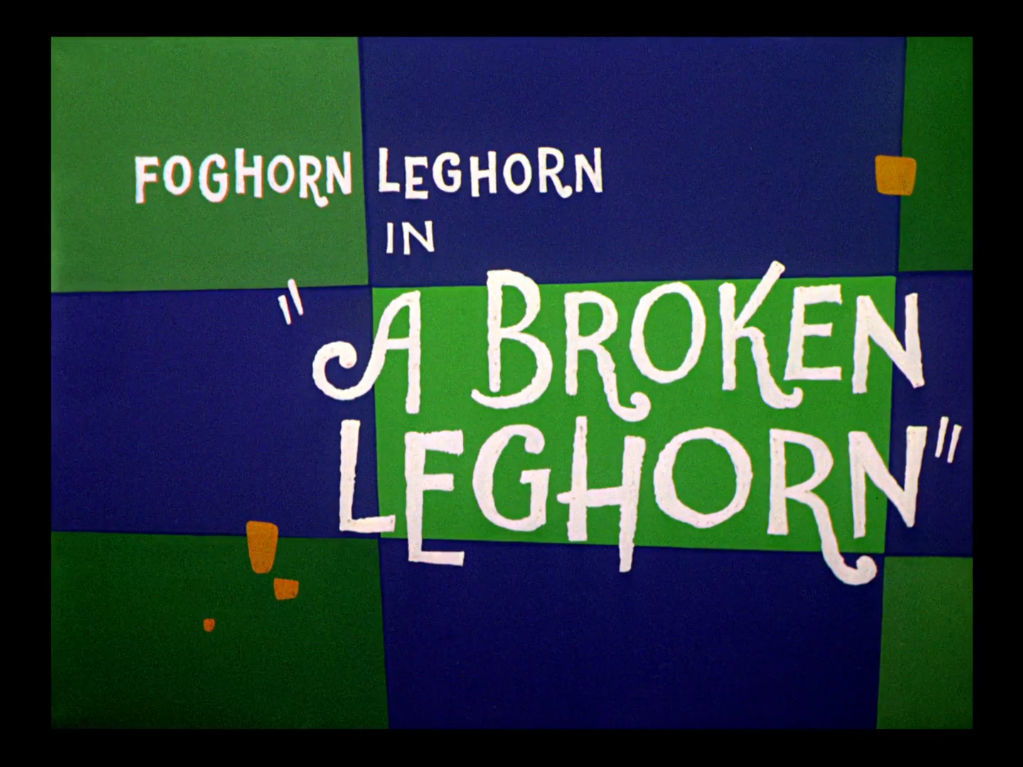
- Title card
- Directed by: Robert McKimson
- Story by: Warren Foster
- Starring: Mel Blanc; June Foray (uncredited)
- Edited by: Treg Brown
- Music by: Milt Franklyn
- Animation by: Character animation: Warren Batchelder; Ted Bonnicksen; George Grandpré; Tom Ray (all in the animation credits)
- Layouts by: Character animation layout: Robert Gribbroek (uncredited)
- Backgrounds by: Background layout: Robert Gribbroek (uncredited); Background paint: William Butler
- Color process: Technicolor
- Production company: Warner Bros. Cartoons
- Distributed by: Warner Bros. Pictures
- Release date: September 26, 1959
- Running time: 6 minutes
- Country: United States
- Language: English

A Broken Leghorn is a 1959 Warner Bros. Looney Tunes cartoon short directed by Robert McKimson. The cartoon was released on September 26, 1959, and features Foghorn Leghorn and Miss Prissy. The voices are performed by Mel Blanc.

== Plot ==
Foghorn Leghorn takes pity on Miss Prissy, whom the other hens are ridiculing because of her inability to lay an egg. To give her confidence, Foghorn slips one of the other hen's eggs under Miss Prissy as she is sitting on her nest. This garners surprise and some admiration as the other hens realize the egg has hatched a rooster chick. Foghorn overhears this fact and is immediately not pleased; there is, he believes, no need for the presence of another rooster "around here". Initially storming into the hen house to make his views known he is taken aback to see the hens standing - arms folded - as a united front. Foghorn decides to "play it cagey" instead and feigns interest in "the cute little tyke".

The chick already has designs on Foghorn's job; the rooster realizes that "this kid's gotta go". He approaches Miss Prissy and gains her permission to "train" her son in "the ancient art of roostering". The rooster chick, however, has figured out Foghorn's plans for him.

Foghorn proceeds with attempts to get rid of his small rival, including: coaxing him to be a chicken crossing the road, hopefully into oncoming traffic, coaxing him to learn about "patience" while Foghorn throws a stick of dynamite through a pipe, trying to get him to pull a cob of corn hard enough to activate the trigger of a rifle Foghorn tied it to, and coaxing him to trigger a land mine when trying to catch a rope used as a fake worm. However, each of these attempts ends with Foghorn getting the worst of things.

Finally, Foghorn stomps towards the farm owner's house, intending to "have it out with the boss" and with the intended ultimatum, "One of us has gotta go!" Upon entering, he is being driven away just as quickly as he entered. He is placed in a cage on the back of a truck, marked "Acme Poultry Co." Foghorn, somewhat bewildered by the unexpected turn of events, says "Well, I guess when you gotta go, you gotta go."

== See also ==
- List of American films of 1959

Preceded by Weasel While You Work	Foghorn Leghorn cartoons 1959	Succeeded by Crockett-Doodle-Do
