= Ducking the Devil =

1957 film by Robert McKimson

- Title card
- Directed by: Robert McKimson
- Story by: Tedd Pierce
- Starring: Mel Blanc
- Edited by: Treg Brown
- Music by: Milt Franklyn
- Animation by: George Grandpre; Ted Bonnicksen
- Layouts by: Robert Gribbroek
- Backgrounds by: William Butler
- Color process: Technicolor
- Production company: Warner Bros. Cartoons
- Distributed by: Warner Bros. Pictures; The Vitaphone Corporation
- Release date: August 17, 1957
- Running time: 6:36
- Country: United States
- Language: English

Ducking The Devil is a 1957 Warner Bros. Merrie Melodies animated cartoon directed by Robert McKimson. The short was released on August 17, 1957, and stars Daffy Duck and the Tasmanian Devil.

== Plot ==
At a zoo, a cage was reserved for the Tasmanian Devil. He soon escapes and runs amok, scaring everyone away from the zoo in the process. Meanwhile, Daffy is at home in his duck pond, and reads about Taz's escape in a newspaper. Taz soon finds him and gives chase after Daffy. While fleeing from Taz's hungry jaws, Daffy hears a news bulletin posting a $5,000 reward (the equivalent of $45,686.65 in 2022) for the Tasmanian Devil's return which also says Taz becomes docile when exposed to music.

After failing with a radio (the extension cord does not go too far), a trombone (Daffy accidentally loses the slide) and bagpipes (apparently the only music Taz does not like), Daffy eventually resorts to using his own singing voice to calm the devil. Eventually, after serenading him for 10 mi (16 km), Daffy leads Taz to his cage, and manages to contain the beast just as he finishes his song-and his voice gives out nearly at the very last point. After Taz grabs some of the Duck's reward money, which slipped on the ground, Daffy rushes inside the cage, screaming one of his most famous lines: "It's mine! Mine, all mine!", and beats up Taz, and reassures the audience that he may be a coward, but he's a "greedy little coward".

== Home media ==
Ducking the Devil is available on the Looney Tunes Super Stars' Daffy Duck: Frustrated Fowl DVD, but was cropped to widescreen. The original full-screen version is available on the Taz's Jungle Jams VHS release, and the Looney Tunes Platinum Collection: Volume 1 Blu-ray.

== Music ==
- Carolina in the Morning by Gus Kahn
- When Irish Eyes are Smiling by Ernest Ball
- Moonlight Bay by Edward Madden
- The Gold Diggers' Song (We're in the Money) by Harry Warren
- L'amour toujours by Catherine Chisholm Cushing
- Sweet Georgia Brown by Ben Bernie and Maceo Pinkard
- I'm Looking Over a Four Leaf Clover by Mort Dixon and Harry M. Woods
- It's Magic by Jule Styne
