= Don't Axe Me =

- Directed by: Robert McKimson
- Story by: Tedd Pierce
- Starring: Mel Blanc (all other voices); Arthur Q. Bryan (Elmer Fudd); June Foray (Elmer's Wife)
- Edited by: Treg Brown
- Music by: Milt Franklyn
- Animation by: Ted Bonnicksen; George Grandpré; Tom Ray
- Layouts by: Robert Gribbroek
- Backgrounds by: William Butler
- Color process: Technicolor
- Production company: Warner Bros. Cartoons
- Distributed by: Warner Bros. Pictures
- Release date: January 4, 1958
- Language: English

Don't Axe Me is a 1958 Warner Bros. Merrie Melodies cartoon directed by Robert McKimson. The short was released on January 4, 1958, and stars Daffy Duck, Elmer Fudd and Barnyard Dawg.

== Plot ==
In this cartoon, Daffy is Elmer's pet, always looking for ways to eat as much food as possible, including the dog's food. When the dog hears that Elmer and his wife are planning a dinner and need to prepare an animal, he convinces the wife to turn Daffy into the meal. So, Elmer goes after Daffy, with Daffy always figuring out a way to avoid getting captured. When Daffy does get captured and is ready to be cooked, it turns out that the guest is a vegetarian. Daffy then leaves in disgust upon hearing the guest's statement.

== Home media ==
This short is available on disc 1 of the Looney Tunes Collector's Vault: Volume 3 Blu-ray set.

== See also ==
- Looney Tunes and Merrie Melodies filmography (1950-1959)
