= Cats and Bruises =

- Directed by: Friz Freleng; Hawley Pratt (co-director)
- Story by: John Dunn
- Produced by: David H. DePatie; Friz Freleng
- Starring: Mel Blanc
- Edited by: Lee Gunther
- Music by: Bill Lava
- Animation by: Don Williams; Bob Matz; Norman McCabe; Warren Batchelder; Lee Halpern; Manuel Perez
- Layouts by: Dick Ung
- Backgrounds by: Tom O'Loughlin
- Color process: Technicolor
- Production company: DePatie–Freleng Enterprises
- Distributed by: Warner Bros. Pictures; The Vitaphone Corporation
- Release date: January 30, 1965
- Running time: 6 minutes
- Language: English

Cats and Bruises is a 1965 Warner Bros. Merrie Melodies cartoon directed by Friz Freleng and Hawley Pratt. The short was released on January 30, 1965, and stars Speedy Gonzales and Sylvester.

The cartoon itself is mostly made up of old recycled footage from previous Warner Bros. cartoons.

== Plot ==
Sylvester spies on the Cinco De Mayo festival where Speedy Gonzales and his friends are dancing and partying. Sylvester then dons a mouse disguise consisting of only a pair of mouse ears, and gatecrashes into the festival. At first when two of Speedy's friends mistake Sylvester in the mouse disguise as a giant mouse, Speedy points out to them that it's a cat (el gato), not a mouse, and all the mice then retreat and run for their lives.

Speedy then lures Sylvester to the dog pound, where he gets attacked by numerous bulldogs. Sylvester escapes from the dog pound and continues chasing Speedy. And when Sylvester successfully catches Speedy with a net, Speedy continues running inside the net, dragging Sylvester along until he crashes into a pole.

Later, Speedy is serenading his girlfriend on a boat on the lake. And Sylvester sees an already inflated raft and goes after Speedy in the inflatable raft, but Speedy throws a dart into the raft, puncturing it and causing Sylvester to sink underwater into the lake.

Next, Sylvester drags a box, a plank and a 500-pound (227-kg) weight to the point at the base of the apartment building that is in a direct vertical line with the window where Speedy and his girlfriend are. He supports the plank with the box in the middle, stands on one end of the plank and heaves the weight onto the other end. This propels him up to Speedy's level and enables him to snatch the mouse. However, as he runs off, the weight lands hard on his head.

Finally, Sylvester builds himself a hot rod racing car and chases Speedy with it. As the chase continues, Sylvester realizes that he forgot to put the brakes on the car, and drives off a cliff and into the lake in the middle of the desert.

With Sylvester out of the way, Speedy then tells his friends that the party continues. Speedy's triumph is, however, short-lived, as an injured Sylvester in a wheelchair then chases Speedy at slow speed, which Speedy claims is "the only way to run."

== Notes ==
Scenes that were reused in this cartoon:

- The Pied Piper of Guadalupe (The chase scene with a mouse holding a "EL GATO LOCO" sign; and the bubbling and squelching sounds from Sylvester's water-logged go-cart)
- Ain't She Tweet (The dogs nearly tear Sylvester apart, and Sylvester tosses a potted plant onto the dogs, yelling "Ah, shaddap!")
- Here Today, Gone Tamale (one part where Sylvester tries catching Speedy with a net, but was dragged up and down the stairs from the latter's agility, including the cat grabbing a nearby mallet; another scene with Speedy asking Sylvester if he's nervous, with the cat trying to bash the mouse with a piece of lead piping; and the scene with the mice having a celebrative dance with Sylvester joining them with fake Mickey Mouse ears)
- A Pizza Tweety Pie (Sylvester in an inflated raft)
- Canary Row (Speedy in place of Tweety)

== Crew ==
- Co-Director: Hawley Pratt
- Story: John Dunn
- Animation: Bob Matz, Norm McCabe, Don Williams, Manny Perez, Warren Batchelder, Lee Halpern
- Layout: Dick Ung
- Backgrounds: Tom O'Loughlin
- Film Editor: Lee Gunther
- Voice Characterizations: Mel Blanc
- Music: Bill Lava
- Produced by: David H. DePatie and Friz Freleng
- Directed by: Friz Freleng
