= Daffy Dilly =

- Original title card
- Directed by: Charles M. Jones
- Story by: Michael Maltese
- Starring: Mel Blanc
- Music by: Carl Stalling
- Animation by: Ben Washam; Lloyd Vaughan; Ken Harris; Phil Monroe; A. C. Gamer
- Layouts by: Robert Gribbroek
- Backgrounds by: Peter Alvarado
- Color process: Cinecolor (original); Technicolor (re-release)
- Production company: Warner Bros. Cartoons
- Distributed by: Warner Bros. Pictures; The Vitaphone Corporation
- Release date: October 30, 1948
- Running time: 7:10
- Language: English

Daffy Dilly is a 1948 Warner Bros. Merrie Melodies cartoon directed by Chuck Jones. The cartoon was released on October 30, 1948, and stars Daffy Duck.

== Plot ==
Daffy Duck, a struggling novelty salesman, learns that tycoon J.B. Cubish (who barely laughed in 5 decades) will pay $1 million to anyone who can make him laugh before he dies. Desperate for the reward, Daffy tries various comical schemes to enter Cubish's mansion, but is thwarted by the butler, whom Daffy addresses as "Jeeves", "Ruggles", and "Meadows" (butlers in other fictional media). Accusing the butler of wanting Cubish to remain ill, Daffy improvises a tale of attempted murder, scaring the butler into fleeing. Finally reaching Cubish, Daffy's clumsy antics accidentally make Cubish laugh. Saved by laughter, Cubish hires Daffy as his jester, ending with Daffy resignedly accepting his fate as pies are thrown at him.

== Voice Cast ==
- Mel Blanc as Daffy Duck / Butler / J.P. Cubish / Newscaster

== Production notes ==
This short was used as the basis of Daffy Duck's Quackbusters (1988), with Daffy inheriting Cubish's fortune on the condition of using the money for the benefit of the public, which he puts into a paranormal extermination service.

According to Pete Alvarado, originally, there was a television instead of a radio, but, in his words, "he kept it out because TVs weren't big enough yet when it came out".

== Home media ==
- Laserdisc 1993 - Duck Victory: Daffy Duck Screen Classics - Warner Home Video
- VHS 1999 – Looney Tunes: The Collectors Edition, Vol. 3 - The Vocal Genius - Warner Home Video/Columbia House
- DVD 2010 – Looney Tunes Super Stars' Daffy Duck: Frustrated Fowl (restored) - Warner Home Video
- Blu-Ray 2025 – Looney Tunes Collector's Vault: Volume 1 (restored) - Warner Archive Collection

== See also ==
- Looney Tunes and Merrie Melodies filmography (1940–1949)
- Daffy Duck filmography

Preceded by You Were Never Duckier	Daffy Duck cartoons 1948	Succeeded by The Stupor Salesman
