= Often an Orphan =

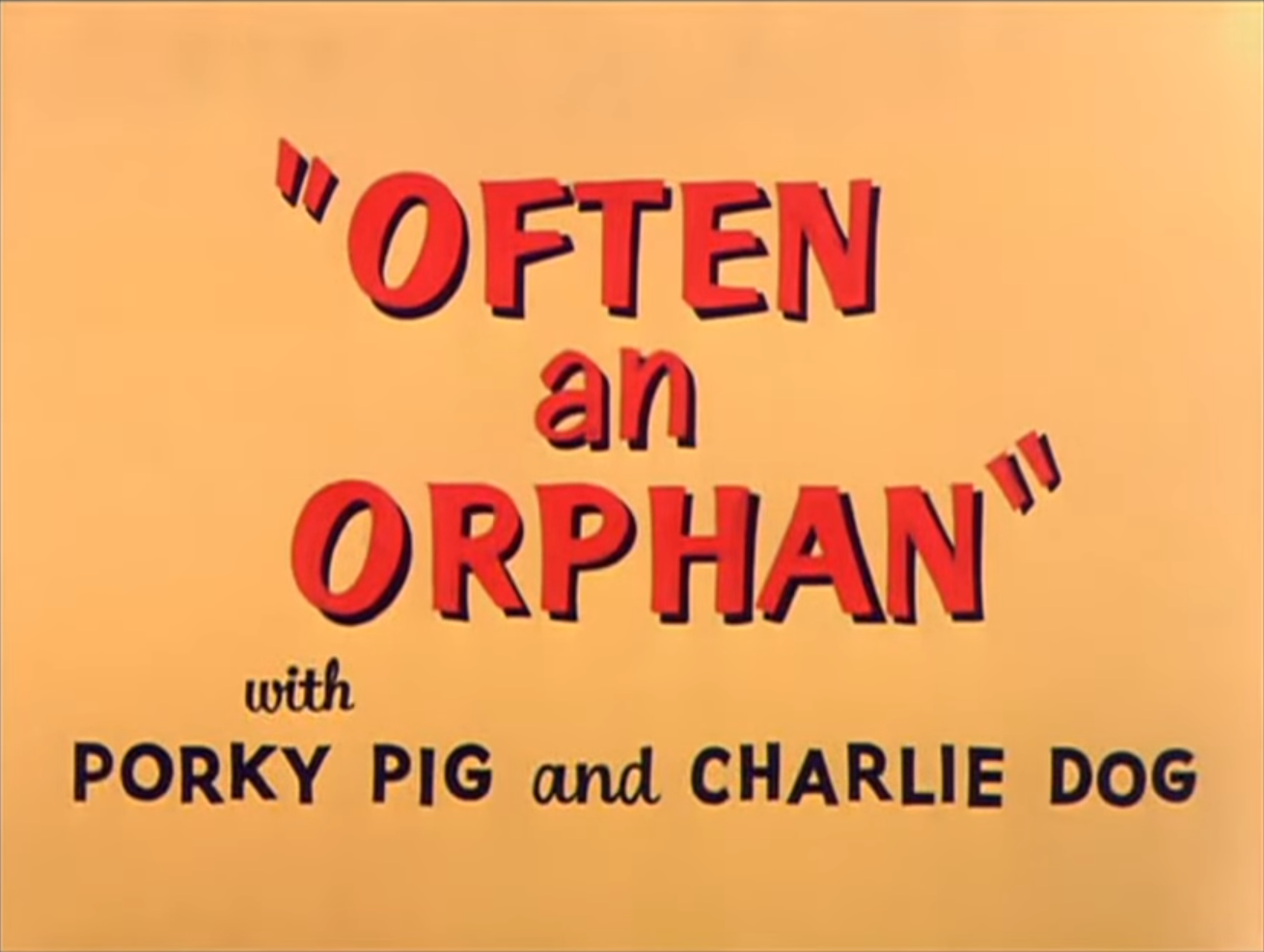
- Title card
- Directed by: Charles M. Jones
- Story by: Michael Maltese
- Starring: Mel Blanc (all voices)
- Edited by: Treg Brown
- Music by: Carl Stalling
- Animation by: Ken Harris; Phil Monroe; Lloyd Vaughan; Ben Washam
- Layouts by: Robert Gribbroek
- Backgrounds by: Peter Alvarado
- Color process: Technicolor
- Production company: Warner Bros. Cartoons
- Distributed by: Warner Bros. Pictures; The Vitaphone Corporation
- Release date: August 13, 1949
- Running time: 7:32
- Language: English

Often an Orphan is a 1949 cartoon in the Merrie Melodies series directed by Chuck Jones. The cartoon was released on August 13, 1949 and stars Charlie Dog and Porky Pig.

The cartoon deals with Charlie trying to get Porky to adopt him after his old owner dumps him at Porky's farm on a trip disguised as a picnic. Charlie instead irritates Porky and the short deals with him trying to get rid of the dog in various ways, but failing each time.

== Plot ==
The cartoon opens with a car driving up near a farm for a picnic and a man coming out and the dog Charlie coming out shortly after him. The man throws a stick, and when Charlie is off getting it, the man packs up and leaves in his car, deliberately leaving the dog behind. After Charlie is dumped, he speaks to the audience, drily bemoaning the fact that he fell for the trick, which has apparently happened before. He then tries various tricks to attract new owners from the people driving along the road, including trying the "big soulful eyes routine". After three failures in various ways, he hears Porky singing and decides to go talk to him. He eventually drives Porky crazy and is kicked off his property. A series of gags then ensues with Charlie trying to become Porky's dog, with them all failing until Porky is about to kick Charlie out but is stopped by a nearby Humane Society worker, who is spying on Porky, who does not want to get in trouble with the law. Porky then sings "Rock-a-bye Baby" as he carries Charlie back and puts Charlie down. After the Humane Society worker leaves, a livid Porky demands that Charlie leave, but Charlie sadly and dramatically pleads Porky not to kick him out, as he always wanted to live in the country, and not the city, while Porky finally feels sorry for Charlie's traumatic experience in the city.

Porky then seemingly accepts Charlie as a pet, but it's revealed to be all a trick, as he puts the dog in a "sleeping bag" (which is actually a mail bag) which he promptly shuts and, cackling evilly, sends Charlie off to Scotland in it. However, when Porky returns, Charlie is there in Scottish attire complete with a bagpipe and he eventually drives Porky into accepting him as a pet with the bagpipe's annoying music.

Porky promptly suggests a picnic afterwards and he decides to head to the middle of a desert to do it, planning to abandon Charlie there. As Porky unpacks the food and calls Charlie out to catch the stick he has, Charlie comes running out. Porky proceeds to throw the stick, but Charlie, not falling for the same trick again that his previous master pulled on him, runs to the car instead of going after the stick and drives off, deliberately leaving Porky behind. Porky at first becomes furious, then suddenly snaps, gets a crazy look in his eyes and starts barking and panting, acting like a dog. He then acts like Charlie with attracting attention, even using the big eyes routine. He is picked up by the county dog catcher, who puts him in the back with the other dogs, where he barks along with them as the cartoon irises out.

== Home media ==
Often an Orphan is available on disc 1 of the Looney Tunes Golden Collection: Volume 6 DVD set, on disc 2 of the Looney Tunes Collector's Vault: Volume 2 Blu-ray set.

== See also ==
- Porky Pig filmography
- Looney Tunes and Merrie Melodies filmography (1940–1949)
