= Bedevilled Rabbit =

1957 film by Robert McKimson

- Lobby card
- Directed by: Robert McKimson
- Story by: Tedd Pierce
- Starring: Mel Blanc
- Edited by: Treg Brown
- Music by: Milt Franklyn
- Animation by: Ted Bonnicksen; Keith Darling; George Grandpré
- Layouts by: Robert Gribbroek
- Backgrounds by: Richard H. Thomas
- Color process: Technicolor
- Production company: Warner Bros. Cartoons
- Distributed by: Warner Bros. Pictures; The Vitaphone Corporation
- Release date: April 13, 1957
- Running time: 7 minutes
- Country: United States
- Language: English

Bedevilled Rabbit is a 1957 Warner Bros. Merrie Melodies short directed by Robert McKimson. The short was released on April 13, 1957, and stars Bugs Bunny. In this cartoon, Bugs is lost in Tasmania, and has to deal with the Tasmanian Devil.

== Plot ==
After a box of carrots is dropped into the middle of a jungle in Tasmania, Bugs Bunny pops out, wondering how he went from sleeping in a carrot patch to the middle of Tasmania. Suddenly, a group of animals come running through the woods, scared for their lives. A crocodile hands Bugs a booklet talking about the Tasmanian devil and the many things it eats.

The Tasmanian Devil comes roaring in and spots Bugs still reading the booklet. After Bugs says "What?! No rabbits?!", Taz turns to the page that says "...And Especially Rabbits" and eats the booklet. Bugs is able to temporarily fool Taz into thinking he is a monkey, which Tasmanian devils do not eat. However, Taz soon starts chasing Bugs. Taz grabs Bugs by his ears.

Bugs ends up on a spit, trussed like a roast pig, as Taz puts salt and pepper on Bugs, which results in Bugs sneezing the apple out of his mouth. Bugs is really nervous, because he is about to be eaten and has no escape plan, but he sees Taz making a large salad to go with him. Bugs compliments Taz on his "mean salad" but informs him that the best thing to have with a salad is "wild turkey surprise", not rabbit. Taz, wanting to try it, unties Bugs. Bugs throws some sticks of dynamite together, lights the fuses and dresses the 'legs' up to look like they are from a turkey. Taz gobbles the dish, but does not seem too harmed from the explosion in his stomach.

When Taz starts chasing Bugs again, Bugs runs into a store owned by a "Trader Mac" and pulls some items off the shelf to dress himself up as a Tasmanian she-devil, whom Taz goes gaga over. Bugs 'makes out' with Taz and, with a bear trap for lips, gives him a big kiss, driving Taz wild. This causes the real Tasmanian she-devil (whom Taz married at the end of Devil May Hare in 1954) to come in and smack him across the head with her rolling pin. Bugs then says to the audience, "she's a nice lady. UGH!"

== Notes ==
- When the short was used for the 1979 film Bugs Bunny's Thanksgiving Diet, Bugs' new dialogue in the "mean salad" scene has him remind Taz that he must not "serve rabbit on Thanksgiving", but instead serve "wild turkey surprise".

== Home media ==
Bedeviled Rabbit is available, uncensored and uncut, on the Looney Tunes Super Stars' Bugs Bunny: Hare Extraordinaire DVD. However, it is cropped to widescreen. It is also shown uncensored, full screened and uncut, on the Looney Tunes Platinum Collection: Volume 1 Blu-ray & DVD set.

Preceded by Ali Baba Bunny	Bugs Bunny Cartoons; 1957	Succeeded by Piker's Peak
