= Aqua Duck =

- Directed by: Robert McKimson
- Story by: John Dunn
- Starring: Mel Blanc
- Edited by: Treg Brown
- Music by: Bill Lava
- Animation by: Ted Bonnicksen; Warren Batchelder; George Grandpre'; Keith Darling
- Layouts by: Robert Gribbroek
- Backgrounds by: Robert Gribbroek
- Color process: Technicolor
- Production company: Warner Bros. Cartoons
- Distributed by: Warner Bros. Pictures
- Release date: September 28, 1963 (US)
- Running time: 6 min.
- Language: English

Aqua Duck is a 1963 Warner Bros. Merrie Melodies cartoon directed by Robert McKimson and written by John Dunn. The short was released on September 28, 1963, and stars Daffy Duck.

== Plot ==
Daffy is wandering across a Dalí-style desert. Under the broiling sun, he is suffering from hyperthermia and dehydration. He seeks water, but finds a gold nugget instead. A pack rat wants to give him water in exchange for the gold, but Daffy refuses to trade.

The desert heat and his thirst take a toll on Daffy's sanity, as he begins imagining that he is in a bar, in a hotel, playing baseball, waiting for the bus, and dancing with a cactus (at this last point a sparsely orchestrated rendition of Johann Strauss II's Tales from the Vienna Woods Waltz Op. 325 occupies the soundtrack). Finally, Daffy becomes so severely dehydrated that he turns to dust and agrees to surrender the gold after the rat restores him with a drop of water.

As he takes a glass of water, a storm swamps him in a flood. For the closing line, he says, "One thing's for sure, when I buy water, I sure get my money's worth!"

== Voice cast ==
- Mel Blanc as Daffy Duck

== Reception ==
Leonard Maltin, writing in Of Mice and Magic, considered this film a low point among Daffy Duck cartoons. Charles Gardner found John Dunn's story creditable but was disappointed with the animation, direction and voice characterization. One commentator, however, noted the attempt to revive Daffy's earlier zany personality and another found the Daliesque setting praiseworthy. The Daffy on Video page gives Aqua Duck one star out of four, finding its execution "cheap and lazy."

Preceded by Million Hare	Daffy Duck Cartoons; 1963	Succeeded by The Iceman Ducketh
