= From Hare to Heir =

- Title card
- Directed by: Friz Freleng
- Story by: Friz Freleng
- Starring: Mel Blanc
- Edited by: Treg Brown
- Music by: Milt Franklyn
- Animation by: Gerry Chiniquy; Art Davis; Virgil Ross
- Layouts by: Hawley Pratt
- Backgrounds by: Tom O'Loughlin
- Color process: Technicolor
- Production company: Warner Bros. Cartoons
- Distributed by: Warner Bros. Pictures
- Release date: September 3, 1960 (USA premiere)
- Running time: 6 minutes 31 seconds
- Country: United States

From Hare to Heir is a 1960 Warner Bros. Merrie Melodies theatrical cartoon short directed and written by Friz Freleng. The short was released on September 3, 1960, and stars Bugs Bunny and Yosemite Sam.

== Plot ==
Duke of Yosemite Sam learns that his uncle, the King, has discontinued his allowance due to frequent displays of anger. In a twist of fate, Bugs Bunny arrives at Sam's doorstep and offers a substantial sum of £1 million under the condition that Sam maintain composure continuously; any lapse in temper will result in a deduction.

Bugs assumes the role of an irritating guest, testing Sam's patience through various antics. Despite initial tolerance, Sam succumbs to frustration, incurring deductions. His attempts to alleviate stress only exacerbate the situation, prompting him to seek solace outdoors. The provocation persists, with Bugs disrupting Sam's rest with raucous piano playing and relentless demands.

Sam, realizing that he won't have anything left if the deductions keep up, decides to kill Bugs and make it look like an accident. In a bid to rid himself of Bugs, Sam devises a scheme, inadvertently falling victim to his own trap. Despite repeated setbacks, Sam ultimately demonstrates restraint, subjecting himself to further indignities to prove his newfound temperance. Amused by Sam's efforts, Bugs reveals him had blown all of the promised reward, leaving Sam to confront his folly.

== Usage in compilations ==
This cartoon was included in the 1983 compilation film Daffy Duck's Movie: Fantastic Island as Sam's wish.

== Home media ==
From Hare to Heir is available, uncensored and uncut, on the Looney Tunes Super Stars' Bugs Bunny: Hare Extraordinaire DVD. However, it was cropped to widescreen.

In 2020, the cartoon was remastered and restored to full screen in the Bugs Bunny 80th Anniversary Collection Blu-Ray.

== See also ==
- List of American films of 1960
- List of Bugs Bunny cartoons
- List of Yosemite Sam cartoons

Preceded by Rabbit's Feat	Bugs Bunny Cartoons; 1960	Succeeded by Lighter Than Hare
