= Bear Feat =

- Title card
- Directed by: Charles M. Jones
- Story by: Michael Maltese
- Starring: Mel Blanc; Bea Benaderet; Billy Bletcher; Stan Freberg
- Narrated by: Stan Freberg
- Music by: Carl Stalling
- Animation by: Ken Harris; Phil Monroe; Lloyd Vaughan; Ben Washam
- Layouts by: Robert Gribbroek
- Backgrounds by: Peter Alvarado
- Production company: Warner Bros. Cartoons
- Distributed by: Warner Bros. Pictures; The Vitaphone Corporation
- Release date: December 10, 1949 (US)
- Running time: 6:53
- Language: English

Bear Feat is a 1949 Warner Bros. Looney Tunes cartoon directed by Chuck Jones and featuring The Three Bears. The short was completed in 1947 and released on December 10, 1949.

== Plot ==
Henry Bear, determined to turn his family into a circus act, subjects Mama Bear and Junyer Bear to a series of mishaps in their backyard. From failed unicycle stunts to disastrous high dives, their efforts end in chaos. When Henry reads the paper, he finds that the newspaper's date reads April 16, 1928. This makes him realize they missed the circus audition by 21 years, as their calendar reads August 1, 1949. Junyer runs to Mama in fear, and she says she tried to tell him. Now certain that all their training was for naught, he spirals into despair, questioning his family's abnormality. Desperate, he attempts suicide but is saved by Junyer's unwitting intervention. Junyer laments his actions, echoing Papa Bear's earlier frustration.

== Voice cast ==
- Mel Blanc as Papa Bear's shout ("1928")
- Billy Bletcher as Papa Bear
- Bea Benaderet as Mama Bear
- Stan Freberg as the Narrator / Junyer Bear

== Home media ==
Bear Feat is available uncut and restored on Disc 1 of Looney Tunes Golden Collection: Volume 6.
