= Person to Bunny =

- Lobby card
- Directed by: Friz Freleng
- Story by: Michael Maltese
- Starring: Mel Blanc; Arthur Q. Bryan (uncredited); Daws Butler (uncredited)
- Edited by: Treg Brown
- Music by: Milt Franklyn; Friz Freleng (Gag compositions)
- Animation by: Arthur Davis; Gerry Chiniquy; Virgil Ross
- Layouts by: Hawley Pratt
- Backgrounds by: Tom O'Loughlin
- Color process: Technicolor
- Production company: Warner Bros. Cartoons
- Distributed by: Warner Bros. Pictures
- Release date: April 1, 1960
- Running time: 7:00
- Language: English

Person to Bunny is a Merrie Melodies animated cartoon directed by Friz Freleng. The short was released on April 1, 1960, and stars Bugs Bunny, Daffy Duck and Elmer Fudd. It is the last cartoon to feature Arthur Q. Bryan as the voice of Elmer, and was released shortly after Bryan's death.

== Plot ==
Bugs Bunny is interviewed in his Hollywood home for the television show People to People by Cedric R. Burrows (a play on Person to Person with Edward R. Murrow). Daffy Duck interrupts, wanting attention, but Bugs sends him away. During the interview, Bugs mocks Elmer Fudd, making Elmer angry. Elmer arrives to confront Bugs into apologizing for insulting him on national television, but Bugs tricks him into shooting a carrot instead.

Daffy, jealous of Bugs' fame, mocks Bugs with a rabbit suit. Mistaken for Bugs, Elmer chases Daffy, leading to chaos. Bugs outsmarts Elmer and returns to the interview. As he returns, Daffy finishes his dancing act and pesters Burrows to put him on air, to which Bugs suggests doing so in order to get rid of him, and Burrows finally obliges to it. As Daffy is about to perform, he asks Bugs if his friends will see him on TV, to which Bugs responds that not only will Daffy's friends be watching, but "forty million other people" will also be watching. Daffy faints after hearing the last sentence, and Bugs and Burrows cordially bid each other good night to end the cartoon.

== Cast ==
- Mel Blanc as Bugs Bunny and Daffy Duck
- Arthur Q. Bryan as Elmer Fudd
- Daws Butler as Cedric R. Burrows

== Home media ==
"Person to Bunny" is available on the Looney Tunes Super Stars' Daffy Duck: Frustrated Fowl DVD. However, it was cropped to widescreen. It was also included in the Stars of Space Jam: Daffy Duck DVD, this time in the ratio in which it was originally animated (fullscreen aspect ratio). In 2020 the cartoon was released on Blu-ray Disc as part of the Bugs Bunny 80th Anniversary Collection once again in its correct aspect ratio.

Preceded by Horse Hare	Bugs Bunny Cartoons; 1960	Succeeded by Rabbit's Feat
