= Rabbit's Feat =

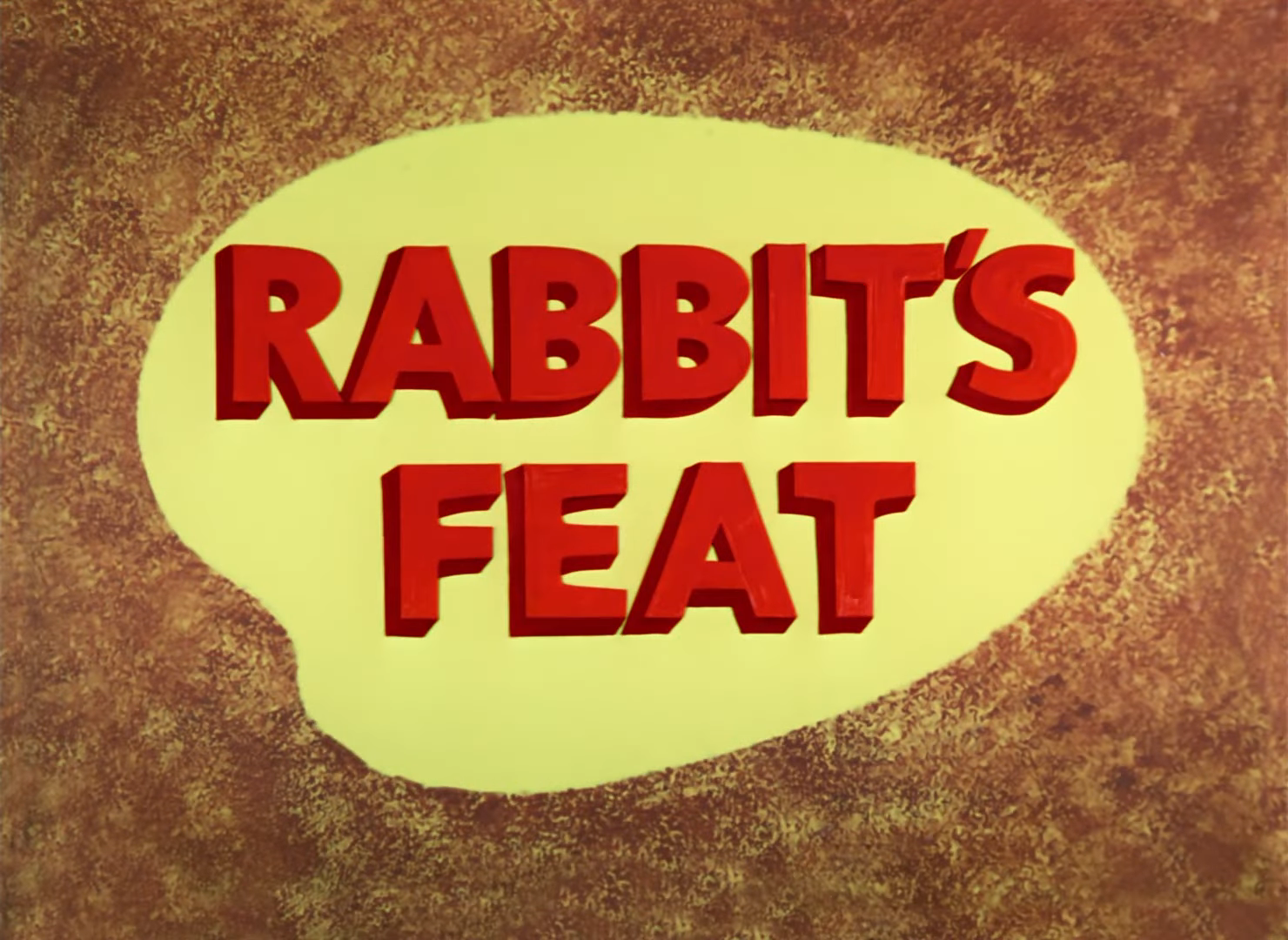
- Title card
- Directed by: Chuck Jones
- Starring: Mel Blanc
- Edited by: Treg Brown
- Music by: Milt Franklyn
- Animation by: Ken Harris; Richard Thompson
- Layouts by: Philip DeGuard
- Backgrounds by: Philip DeGuard
- Color process: Technicolor
- Production company: Warner Bros. Cartoons
- Distributed by: Warner Bros. Pictures; The Vitaphone Corporation
- Release date: June 4, 1960 (USA)
- Running time: 6:07
- Language: English

Rabbit's Feat is an animated 1960 Warner Bros. Looney Tunes cartoon, directed by Chuck Jones. The short was released on June 4, 1960, and stars Bugs Bunny and Wile E. Coyote.

== Plot ==
Wile E. Coyote introduces himself as a hunting genius in pursuit of the Western rabbit, strategically setting up a picnic to lure Bugs Bunny. Upon capturing Bugs, Wile E. prepares to cook him, but Bugs cleverly feigns distress from behind a rock, leading to comedic confrontation. Wile E.'s subsequent attempts to exterminate Bugs are comically foiled, including failed rifle shots and a misguided plan to use dynamite in a carrot. Bugs ingeniously turns the tables on Wile E., causing him to suffer the consequences of his own schemes.

Ultimately, defeated and battered, Wile E. concedes defeat, adopting a new vegetarian lifestyle and seeking medical help.

Preceded by Person to Bunny	Bugs Bunny Cartoons; 1960	Succeeded by From Hare to Heir
