= The Jet Cage =

1962 film by Friz Freleng

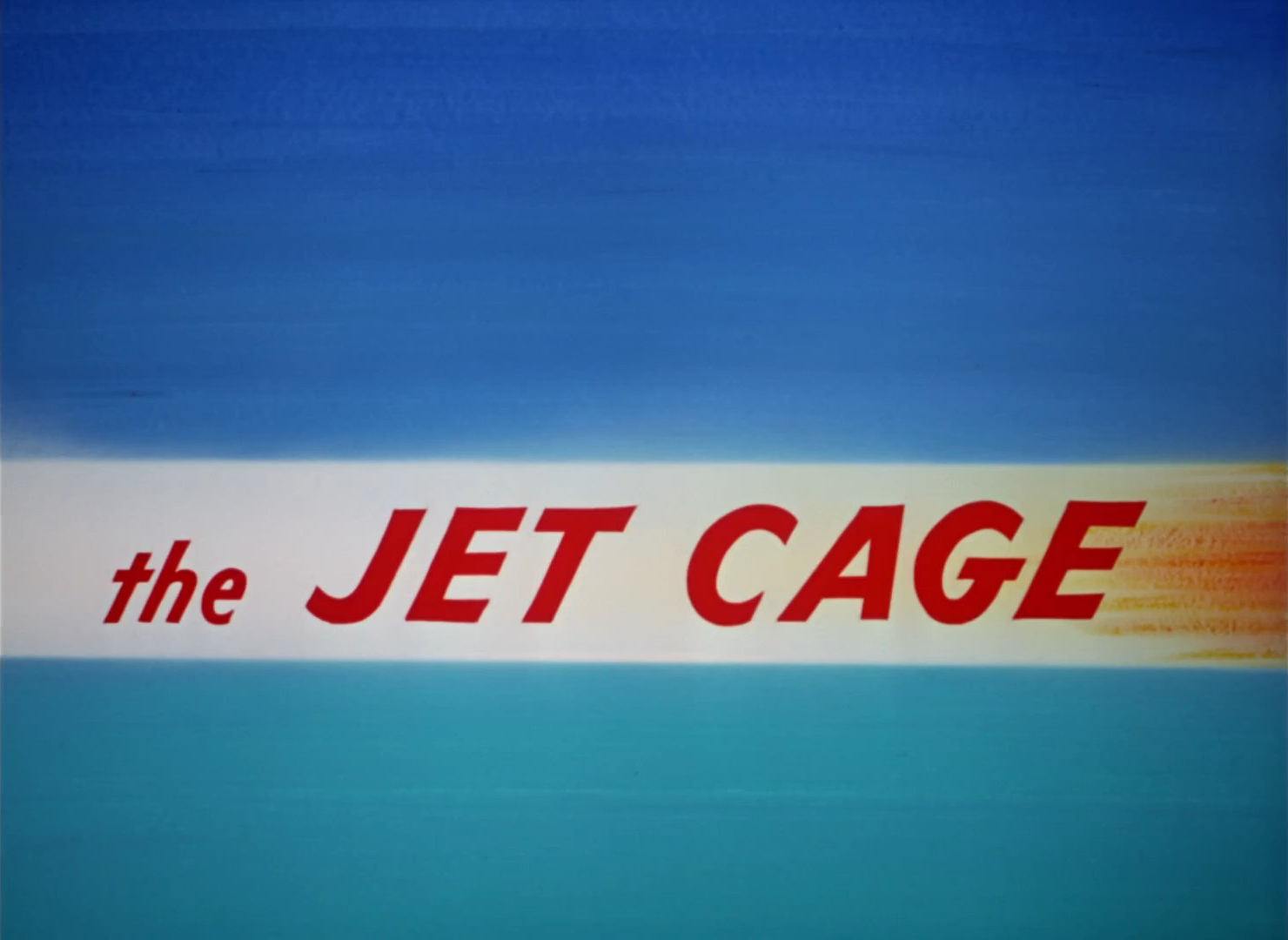
- Title card
- Directed by: Friz Freleng
- Written by: Friz Freleng
- Starring: Mel Blanc; June Foray
- Edited by: Treg Brown
- Music by: Milt Franklyn; William Lava (uncredited)
- Animation by: Gerry Chiniquy; Art Leonardi; Virgil Ross; Lee Halpern; Bob Matz
- Layouts by: Hawley Pratt
- Backgrounds by: Tom O'Loughlin
- Color process: Technicolor
- Production company: Warner Bros. Cartoons
- Distributed by: Warner Bros. Pictures; The Vitaphone Corporation
- Release date: September 22, 1962
- Running time: 6 minutes
- Language: English

The Jet Cage is a 1962 Warner Bros. Looney Tunes cartoon directed by Friz Freleng. The short was released on September 22, 1962, and stars Tweety and Sylvester.

The voice actors are Mel Blanc (doing the voices of Sylvester, Tweety and Blackbird) and June Foray (doing the voice for Granny).

The animation was by Gerry Chiniquy, Lee Halpern, Art Leonardi, Bob Matz and Virgil Ross. The layouts were designed by Hawley Pratt and the backgrounds by Tom O'Loughlin. The original music was composed by Milt Franklyn, who died during production on April 24, and by an uncredited William Lava, who completed Franklyn's unfinished score. It was the last Tweety short directed by Freleng (Tweety's final Golden Age short, Hawaiian Aye Aye, was directed by Gerry Chiniquy).

== Plot ==
Tweety sits in a bird cage in his house, looking at the birds through the window. Tweety yearns dearly to fly freely like other birds, but is not allowed to do so by Granny. That is considering his safety, as Sylvester is always lurking around waiting for a chance to capture and eat him.

Granny reads a newspaper advertisement by Jet Age Technology, which has invented a $12.95 Flying Bird Cage, which would allow birds to fly safely. Granny, who understands Tweety's longing for freedom, decides to buy the cage and presents it to Tweety. This enables Tweety to fly outdoors without leaving his cage's security.

Sylvester is at first taken aback at the sight of Tweety flying safely, piloting the jet-powered cage like an airplane. Two crows also watch in awe ("And all this time, I've been doing it the hard way," one crow remarks). Sylvester resolves to ground Tweety's cage and get his meal; his eyes rolling around to follow his every move.

Each of the following attempts is in vain:

- An attempt to snare the cage with a butterfly catcher's net. The jet-powered cage is strong enough to drag the butterfly net, along with the cat hanging to it, until he crashes into a light pole.
- After Tweety comes in for flying instructions ("I forgot what to do in case of fog!"), Sylvester sneaks inside the cage. Tweety eventually senses he's in trouble and releases the "bombs" into a river mid-air, just before Sylvester is about to strike.
- Sylvester then builds a "NIKE rocket" designed to intercept the flying object of interest. The rocket flies back at the cat, who ducks into a nearby barrel. However, the rocket flies into the barrel just before Sylvester hammers the lid shut from inside. Upon realizing the rocket is also in the barrel, a panicked Sylvester manages to remove the nails, but the second he attempts to step out of the barrel, the rocket explodes.
- A horseshoe-shaped magnet tied to a fishing rod. While the cage momentarily struggles against the magnet's pull (and the puddy tries to reel in his meal), Tweety manages to get the cage to break free. Sylvester is dragged into downtown traffic and crashes into a bus.
- Sylvester then uses a pair of ping-pong paddles as makeshift wings to fly beside Tweety. Sylvester gloats, mocking the bird for thinking he outsmarted him, but Tweety points out that Sylvester has his hands full. The cat tosses the paddles aside and shoots back, "Well, now I haven't!" ...just before he realizes he's in for a big fall.

At the end, Sylvester—limping on crutches and heavily bandaged—decides to join the U.S. Air Force, vowing to earn his wings and get Tweety once and for all (Sylvester was reading the sign: "Earn your wings at the U.S.A.F. Hmm that’s what I’ll do. And when I do, watch out, bird!”).

Throughout the cartoon, the sound effects for the jet cage's engines are more appropriate to a propeller-driven aircraft, and so is the terminology Tweety uses when he reads aloud from the pilot's manual.
