= High Note (film) =

1960 film by Chuck Jones

- Directed by: Chuck Jones
- Story by: Michael Maltese
- Starring: Mel Blanc
- Edited by: Treg Brown
- Music by: Milt Franklyn
- Animation by: Ken Harris; Richard Thompson
- Layouts by: Maurice Noble
- Backgrounds by: William Butler; Philip DeGuard
- Color process: Technicolor
- Production company: Warner Bros. Cartoons
- Distributed by: Warner Bros. Pictures
- Release date: December 3, 1960
- Running time: 6:31 minutes
- Country: United States
- Language: English

High Note is a 1960 American animated short film directed by Chuck Jones and written by Michael Maltese. It was originally released by Warner Bros. Pictures on December 3, 1960, as part of the Looney Tunes series. The short features no dialogue, relying solely on the animation and music to carry the plot. It was nominated for an Academy Award for Best Short Film (Cartoon) in 1961, losing to Gene Deitch's Munro.

== Plot ==
Various musical notes set up sheet music in preparation for a performance of "The Blue Danube". As the music begins, however, it becomes apparent that a note is missing. The note (a red-faced "High Note") is revealed to be drunk, staggering out of the "Little Brown Jug" sheet music.

The irritated music-note conductor chases the intoxicated note, intending to put him back in his place so the waltz can properly continue. Throughout the pursuit, many objects are created from the simple musical notes: a dog, a slide, a clothes hanger, a lasso, horses, and more. Eventually, the rogue note is put back into place, but is again missing when the performance starts over. This time, though, the balance of the remaining music is also gone. The conductor discovers that all the notes have gone into the "Little Brown Jug" to get drunk. The original High Note, who is in Irving Berlin's "How Dry I Am", replaces the "I" with "We."

== Soundtrack ==
- "The Blue Danube" - Johann Strauss II
- "How Dry I Am" - Irving Berlin
- "Little Brown Jug" - Joseph Winner
- Brahms' Lullaby - Johannes Brahms
- "Where, Oh Where, Has My Little Dog Gone?" - Septimus Winner

== Reception ==
Animation historian Jerry Beck writes, "In today's world, where vintage cartoons are typically mistaken for children's fare, masterpieces like High Note set the record straight — with a healthy dose of classically adult booze humor."

== Home media ==
This short is featured on Disc 3 of the Warner Bros. Home Entertainment Academy Awards Animation Collection DVD set and on Disc 2 of the Looney Tunes Platinum Collection: Volume 3 Blu-ray and DVD sets.

== See also ==
- List of American films of 1960
