= Well Worn Daffy =

- Directed by: Robert McKimson
- Story by: David Detiege
- Produced by: David H. DePatie; Friz Freleng
- Starring: Mel Blanc
- Edited by: Lee Gunther
- Music by: Bill Lava
- Animation by: Warren Batchelder; Bob Matz; Laverne Harding; Norm McCabe; Don Williams; Manny Perez
- Layouts by: Dick Ung
- Backgrounds by: Tom O'Loughlin
- Color process: Technicolor
- Production company: DePatie–Freleng Enterprises
- Distributed by: Warner Bros. Pictures; Vitagraph Company of America
- Release date: May 22, 1965
- Running time: 7 minutes
- Language: English

Well Worn Daffy is a 1965 Warner Bros. Looney Tunes animated short directed by Robert McKimson. The short was released on May 22, 1965, and stars Daffy Duck and Speedy Gonzales.

In the film, Speedy and his two traveling companions seek water in the desert. The only well in the area belongs to Daffy, who refuses to share his water with them. This refusal starts a water conflict.

== Plot ==
Speedy Gonzales and his two mouse companions are lost in the desert dying of thirst when they happen upon a well. However, they shortly discover Daffy is the owner, and he refuses to give them any water, despite their desperate pleas (Speedy: Surely one insignificant drop of water wouldn't hurt? Daffy: No! That's one insignificant drop too much!)

After shooting at them, Speedy and his friends are forced to watch Daffy and his camel not only drink, but shower and water the trees (presumably to taunt them). Speedy devises a plan to lure Daffy away from the well while his friends get some water, but the camel booby-traps it. Speedy tries again and when Daffy shoots at him, he somehow knocks a tree down on himself. The mice's further attempts are foiled by either Daffy shooting the cup full of holes or the camel tripping Speedy. A last attempt involves Speedy traveling underground with the hose (in similar manner to both Bugs and Daffy in earlier cartoons), only to have Daffy come out the end and shoot them again.

Finally, Daffy packs his camel with as much water as needed for a journey home and loads the well with dynamite so the mice cannot have any. Fortunately, Speedy ties the string of dynamite to Daffy's camel so the well is safe. Speedy and his friends drink as much as they can, and soon Daffy and his camel come along begging for water, due to how when they realized that Speedy had tied the dynamite string to them, in their panic, they dumped all the water they had packed in fright. Speedy obliges by spraying him down. Daffy replies, "There's one thing worse than a smart mouse, and that's three smart mice."

== Reception ==
Will Friedwald and Jerry Beck disliked Well Worn Daffy, citing dynamite attached to the camel as a particularly revolting gag. "Cartoons like this we can all do without."

== Crew ==
- Director: Robert McKimson
- Story: David Detiege
- Animation: Don Williams, Manny Perez, Warren Batchelder, Bob Matz, Laverne Hardling, Norm McCabe
- Layout: Dick Ung
- Backgrounds: Tom O'Loughlin
- Film Editor: Lee Gunther
- Voice Characterizations: Mel Blanc
- Music: Bill Lava
- Produced by: David H. DePatie and Friz Freleng
