= It's Nice to Have a Mouse Around the House =

- Directed by: Friz Freleng; Hawley Pratt
- Story by: John Dunn
- Produced by: David H. DePatie; Friz Freleng
- Starring: Mel Blanc; Ge Ge Pearson
- Edited by: Lee Gunther
- Music by: Bill Lava
- Animation by: Don Williams; Bob Matz; Norman McCabe
- Layouts by: Dick Ung
- Backgrounds by: Tom O'Loughlin
- Color process: Technicolor
- Production company: DePatie–Freleng Enterprises
- Distributed by: Warner Bros. Pictures; Vitagraph Company of America
- Release date: January 16, 1965
- Running time: 6 minutes
- Language: English

It's Nice to Have a Mouse Around the House is a 1965 Warner Bros. Looney Tunes cartoon animated short directed by Friz Freleng. The short was released on January 16, 1965, and stars Daffy Duck, Speedy Gonzales, Sylvester and Granny. The voices were performed by Mel Blanc and Ge Ge Pearson.

== Characters ==
The cartoon marked the first theatrical pairing of Daffy Duck and Speedy Gonzales, with Daffy serving as Speedy's new foe. In addition, Granny is voiced here by Ge Ge Pearson instead of June Foray, who marks her swan song appearance as the owner of Sylvester; Granny would make one more appearance in a Warner Bros. cartoon later in 1965.

== Plot ==
Speedy Gonzales invades Granny's home and drives Sylvester to a nervous breakdown. Concerned about the welfare of her cat, Granny calls on the Jet Age Pest Control to remove the rodent. Daffy Duck is assigned the job.

When conventional traps fail, the determined Daffy decides to use a series of contraptions to capture Speedy. However, Speedy is always one step ahead of the duck, and Daffy winds up getting the worst of his machinery.

The final attempt sees Daffy try to program a robot with a card featuring Speedy's picture, but Speedy grabs a Daffy Duck comic book and fools the robot. The robot is seen chasing Daffy out of the house as Speedy watches and remarks to the audience: "It's pretty nice having a mouse around the house, no?"

== Home media ==
The short is included as an extra on Looney Tunes Mouse Chronicles: The Chuck Jones Collection.

== Succession ==
Preceded by The Iceman Ducketh	Daffy Duck cartoons 1965	Succeeded by Moby Duck

== See also ==
- List of American films of 1965
