= Bartholomew Versus the Wheel =

- Title card
- Directed by: Robert McKimson
- Story by: John Dunn
- Starring: Mel Blanc; Leslie Barringer
- Edited by: Treg Brown
- Music by: Bill Lava
- Animation by: George Grandpre; Ted Bonnicksen; Warren Batchelder
- Layouts by: Bob Givens
- Backgrounds by: Robert Gribbroek
- Production company: Warner Bros. Cartoons
- Distributed by: Warner Bros. Pictures
- Release date: February 29, 1964
- Running time: 5:50
- Language: English

Bartholomew Versus the Wheel is a 1964 Warner Bros. Merrie Melodies cartoon directed by Robert McKimson. It was released theatrically on February 29, 1964.

The production was the second of three cartoons to use the "modern" abstract Warner Bros. opening and closing sequences created by Chuck Jones. The sequence was previously used on Now Hear This and would be used once more in Señorella and the Glass Huarache. The visual style of the cartoon was developed in the style of cartoonist and book illustrator James Thurber. Thurber died in 1961, three years before the cartoon's release.

== Plot ==
The cartoon tells the story of Bartholomew, a large yellow dog with a penchant for barking at anything he sees. Though well-loved by his young owner (the narrator), he often has to compete with the family cat for love and affection, leaving him aggressive. One day, after having his tail run over by a scooter, Bartholomew gets a new enemy in the form of wheels, and as he gets bigger and older, he attacks and rips the wheels off any vehicle he can - except for the dogcatcher’s truck.

Years later, Bartholomew decides to go after the only other wheel he has yet to rip off - those of an airplane's landing gears. After some struggle, he manages to bite onto one of the wheels on a plane, but cannot rip it off and is instead flown all the way over to an unspecified African country. His sudden disappearance distresses the townsfolk, who search everywhere they can for him, to no avail.

Finding himself alone and isolated, Bartholomew ultimately manages to escape by biting onto the wheel of another plane. It flies him all the way back to his hometown, where he is welcomed back with a ride in the mayor’s car. Changed by his experience, Bartholomew now likes wheels instead of hating them, and now only hates one thing - cats, which he is not afraid to remind the family cat about.

== Cast and Crew ==
- Animation - George Grandpre, Ted Bonnicksen, Warren Batchelder
- Layouts - Bob Givens
- Backgrounds - Robert Gribbroek
- Story - John Dunn
- Music - Bill Lava
- Voice Characterizations - Mel Blanc, Leslie Barringer
- Producer - David H. DePatie
- Director - Robert McKimson

== Home media ==
The cartoon is available as an extra feature on disc four of the Looney Tunes Golden Collection: Volume 6 DVD set.
