= Dog Pounded =

1954 film by Friz Freleng

- Title card
- Directed by: I. Freleng
- Story by: Warren Foster
- Starring: Mel Blanc
- Music by: Carl Stalling
- Animation by: Manuel Perez; Ken Champin; Virgil Ross; Arthur Davis
- Layouts by: Hawley Pratt
- Backgrounds by: Irv Wyner
- Color process: Technicolor
- Production company: Warner Bros. Cartoons
- Distributed by: Warner Bros. Pictures; The Vitaphone Corporation
- Release date: January 2, 1954
- Running time: 6:38
- Language: English

Dog Pounded is a 1954 (© 1953) Warner Bros. Looney Tunes animated cartoon short directed by Friz Freleng. The short was released on January 2, 1954, and stars Tweety and Sylvester. The voices were performed by Mel Blanc. The title is a play on the phrase dog pound.

Similar in concept to Ain't She Tweet, this cartoon features Sylvester in pursuit of catching Tweety, with a gang of bulldogs (including Hector) as the obstacles. Dog Pounded also marks the only use of Pepé Le Pew in a Friz Freleng-directed short (and the second time Pepé Le Pew has appeared in a cartoon that was not directed by Chuck Jones or a member from Chuck Jones' unit—the first being Arthur Davis' Odor of the Day).

== Plot ==
A destitute Sylvester rummages through trash in search of food. Nearly out of luck, the cat hears singing from atop a tall tree inside an enclosure, looks up, and sees Tweety. Eager for his supper, Sylvester rushes inside the enclosure, unaware that the enclosure is the city dog pound. Sylvester gets attacked and driven from the pound by an army of bulldogs, whose purpose in life seemingly is to protect Tweety from predators.

Wanting to get by the dogs, Sylvester employs the following tricks, all of them failing:

- Holding an umbrella for balance, the cat walks across a guide wire connecting a light pole and the tree. The dogs collectively blow a gust of doggie breath at their foe, causing Sylvester to lose his balance and fall into the waiting horde of dogs.
- Digging a tunnel beneath the dog pound to get at the tree unnoticed and snatch Tweety. The dogs, already having anticipated this latest scheme, have dug their tunnel and waited for Sylvester to break through to their side. They attack Sylvester and chase him back to the tunnel entrance. Once out of the tunnel, he closes it with a shovel and forces the dogs back in.
- A dog suit. The dogs startle their new "companion," causing the head to come loose, and Sylvester quickly tries to secure it before the dogs notice. However, either having already seen or never being fooled from the start, the dogs reject Sylvester (as a fake dog) and force him to flee. The cat temporarily gets away, but the city dog catcher quickly returns him to his "home" (and a further beating).
- Sylvester tries to climb over the fence, but the wall knocks him inside to the ground as a dog comes on the outside. The dog goes back in, flipping the fence frame back and revealing Sylvester having been clobbered.
- Mass hypnotism, which momentarily evens the odds; by staring at the dogs, Sylvester is able to freeze and paralyze them in place. Sylvester easily grabs Tweety, who panics and helplessly yells for his protectors to rescue him. When Sylvester blurts out the secret to un-freezing the dogs (a police whistle), Tweety instantly provides one and begins to blow, though Sylvester quickly sees that coming and places a glass over Tweety. But Tweety fights back by poking Sylvester's palm with a needle... and breaking the dogs out of their trance. Sylvester flees the pound, but is grabbed back in for another pounding by a bulldog.
- Entering an empty dog pound, Sylvester tries climbing the tree... only to discover the dogs waiting on the branches.
- Blasting himself off in a rocket. The rocket shoots without him, and he is shown as furless.
- A swing, which Sylvester hopes will allow him to swing harmlessly above the dogs to the tree. However, the swing's reach is too low, and the dogs manage to get at Sylvester... who never returns to the outside.

The final attempt nearly works: Painting a phony skunk stripe down his back to scare the dogs away. This plan works too well: just as he grabs Tweety and makes his getaway, he is intercepted by Pepé Le Pew, who mistakes Sylvester for a female skunk and tries to have sex with him. While Sylvester tries to break free from Pepé's grasp, Tweety looks on and comments, "That puddy tat has turned into an awful stinker!" Pepé's high-pitched kissing sounds are heard just before the "That's all, Folks!" title card appears.

== Reception ==
Animation writer Earl Kress writes, "By 1954 Tweety cartoons had become, if not exactly predictable, then at least formulaic. However, Dog Pounded is a very clever twist on the Tweety-Sylvester-Granny-Hector quadrangle."
