= The Pied Piper of Guadalupe =

- Directed by: Friz Freleng; Hawley Pratt
- Story by: John Dunn
- Starring: Mel Blanc
- Edited by: Treg Brown
- Music by: Milt Franklyn
- Animation by: Gerry Chiniquy; Bob Matz; Virgil Ross
- Layouts by: Hawley Pratt
- Backgrounds by: Tom O'Loughlin
- Color process: Technicolor
- Production company: Warner Bros. Cartoons
- Distributed by: Warner Bros. Pictures
- Release date: August 19, 1961
- Running time: 6 minutes
- Language: English

The Pied Piper of Guadalupe is a 1961 Warner Bros. Looney Tunes cartoon directed by Friz Freleng. The short was released on August 19, 1961, and stars Speedy Gonzales and Sylvester.

The second ever Warner Bros. cartoon to take parody elements from the fairy tale The Pied Piper (following Paying the Piper starring Porky Pig), it was nominated at the 34th Academy Awards in the category of Best Animated Short.

== Synopsis ==
After being taunted and mocked by the mice in Guadalupe, Sylvester imitates the Pied Piper of Hamelin in an attempt to lure the mice of Mexico, so he can trap them in a jar. But his flute has no effect on Speedy Gonzales, the fastest mouse in all of Mexico, when he decides to rescue his friends, one by one.

== Plot ==
Sylvester finds himself constantly teased by the local mice as they outsmart him at every turn, going so far as to bonk him on the head with a two-by-four when he insults them, no matter how far away he is from their hole. Hoping to get even with them, Sylvester is inspired by a book based on the Pied Piper of Hamelin and goes to take music lessons on the flute. Once he has studied the flute well, he returns to get his payback on the mice. At first, when the mice see him, they ridicule him, but their taunting ends abruptly when Sylvester plays Jarabe Tapatío on his flute. One by one, the tune entrances the mice and makes them dance out to Sylvester, who then conks them on the head with his flute and places them in a large bottle.

The rest of the mice are soon captured, and any countermeasures the mice attempt to implement fail. Just as Sylvester thinks he's finally gotten his revenge on the mice, he soon discovers that he missed Speedy Gonzales. Speedy demands his friends back, but Sylvester refuses, even taunting Speedy to try to rescue them. Calling Sylvester's bluff, Speedy makes for the bottle and manages to rescue one before Sylvester can even put the cork back in. Angered, Sylvester tries to lure Speedy in via his flute, but Speedy merely pretends to be hypnotized, and when Sylvester tries to bonk him, Speedy dodges and clobbers him in turn.

Later, Sylvester hides from Speedy in a wooden barrel. When he hears him coming, Sylvester lights a stick of dynamite to throw out at Speedy, but Speedy flanks him from behind and hops on the barrel, using his speed to start the barrel rolling. The barrel rolls down some stairs, enveloping a dog sleeping at the bottom. The dynamite goes off, charring Sylvester and the dog, after which the now angry dog chases after Sylvester.

As Speedy continues his rescue operation, Sylvester waits behind an archway on a motorcycle, and when Speedy passes, Sylvester chases him. After a long pursuit, Speedy stops at a cliff edge, and Sylvester plunges over the edge and into the lake below. After some trouble restarting the bike underwater, Sylvester struggles back up the cliff. Speedy sees him coming and lures Sylvester towards a one-way street, and while Speedy hides by the sign, Sylvester drives straight in and collides with a bus coming from the opposite direction.

Sylvester later emerges from the hospital covered in bandages and bruises, only for Speedy to catch up to him and offer him his flute back. However, after what he's been through, Sylvester declines. Speedy thanks Sylvester, but as he plays it, Sylvester's bandaged leg begins to wiggle to the tune, and he helplessly dances after Speedy, yowling in pain.
