= The Stupor Salesman =

1948 animated short film by Arthur Davis

- Title card
- Directed by: Arthur Davis
- Story by: Lloyd Turner; Bill Scott
- Starring: Mel Blanc
- Music by: Carl Stalling
- Animation by: Basil Davidovich; Emery Hawkins; Bill Melendez; Don Williams; Herman Cohen
- Layouts by: Don Smith
- Backgrounds by: Philip DeGuard
- Color process: Technicolor
- Production company: Warner Bros. Cartoons
- Distributed by: Warner Bros. Pictures
- Release date: November 20, 1948
- Running time: 7:03
- Language: English

The Stupor Salesman is a Warner Bros. Looney Tunes cartoon, directed by Arthur Davis, and written by Lloyd Turner and Bill Scott. The cartoon was released on November 20, 1948, and stars Daffy Duck.

== Plot ==
Slug McSlug, a cunning canine criminal, pulls off a successful bank robbery. After eluding the police, he retreats to his country hideout. However, his peace is disrupted by the persistent Daffy Duck, a relentless salesman peddling various wares.

Despite McSlug's attempts to rid himself of Daffy, the determined duck continues to intrude, employing unconventional methods to gain entry. With each attempt, Daffy's antics frustrate McSlug, leading to a series of comical confrontations. Daffy is convinced that there must be something McSlug needs that he can sell him.

As tensions escalate, Daffy's saleable items prevail over McSlug's violence, ultimately causing the gangster's downfall when he tests a lighter without realizing that the gas from his oven is turned on, resulting in a fiery explosion that blows up McSlug's hideout house. With McSlug defeated, Daffy revels in his victory, now knowing what his foe will need. "Hey, bub!" Daffy, with the doorknob from the house's front door in his hand, tells McSlug. "You need a house to go with this doorknob!"

== Voice Cast ==
- Mel Blanc as Daffy Duck / Slug McSlug / Newscaster / Newsboy / Police Dispatch

== Reception ==
Animation historian Mike Mallory writes, "There is not a wasted cel in The Stupor Salesman. At first glance, the story of a bank robber who cannot escape the diabolical persistence of door-to-door salesman Daffy Duck (at his stream-of-consciousness best) sounds like a conventional pest-vs.-threat cartoon, but it is not. The short zooms by with the insistent pacing of the early Warner Bros. gangster films it aggressively parodies. Rarely, if ever, has one seven-minute cartoon burst its seams so thoroughly with inventive sight gags, throwaway jokes, and visual details."

== Home media ==
- Laserdisc 1994 - Guffaw and Order: Looney Tunes Fight Crime - Warner Home Video
- VHS 1997 - Superior Duck - Warner Home Video
- VHS 1999 - Looney Tunes: The Collector's Edition, Vol. 3 - The Vocal Genius - Warner Home Video/Columbia House
- DVD 2007 - Looney Tunes Golden Collection: Volume 5 (restored) - Warner Home Video
- DVD 2007 - Looney Tunes Spotlight Collection: Volume 5 (restored) - Warner Home Video
- Blu-Ray & DVD 2014 - Looney Tunes Platinum Collection: Volume 3 (restored) - Warner Home Video

== See also ==
- Daffy Duck filmography
- Looney Tunes and Merrie Melodies filmography (1940–1949)

Preceded by Daffy Dilly	Daffy Duck cartoons 1948	Succeeded by Riff Raffy Daffy
