= Thumb Fun =

- Title card
- Directed by: Robert McKimson
- Story by: Tedd Pierce
- Starring: Mel Blanc
- Music by: Carl Stalling
- Animation by: Rod Scribner; Phil DeLara; Charles McKimson; Bob Wickersham; Keith Darling
- Layouts by: Peter Alvarado
- Backgrounds by: Richard H. Thomas
- Color process: Technicolor
- Production company: Warner Bros. Cartoons
- Distributed by: Warner Bros. Pictures; The Vitaphone Corporation
- Release date: March 1, 1952
- Running time: 7:23
- Language: English

Thumb Fun is a 1952 Warner Bros. Looney Tunes short directed by Robert McKimson. The cartoon was released on March 1, 1952, and stars Daffy Duck and Porky Pig.

== Plot ==
Daffy Duck decides to hitchhike south but struggles to catch a ride. He tricks Porky Pig into giving him a lift by painting a fake hole in the road. Porky protests since there's no room left in the trunk, but Daffy dismisses him and shoves his entire luggage into the back. Porky is amazed that all of Daffy's luggage was able to fit in the trunk and opens it, causing all the luggage to shoot out at him.

Along the way, they encounter a small car tailgating them, leading Daffy to forcefully brake Porky's car so he can confront the driver. Much to his surprise, the driver is tall and menacing and leaves Daffy to comically grovel like a dog to avoid confrontation; subsequently, the driver takes it out on Porky by slamming his fist onto the pig's head.

Later, Daffy gets impatient and wants Porky to speed up the car, although Porky refuses because he does not want to get in trouble for speeding. Ignoring him, Daffy steps on the pedal and causes the car to accelerate. His reckless driving gets them into trouble with the law and they are pulled over by a highway cop. Daffy decides to trick the cop by opening the trunk, despite Porky trying to stop him. After getting launched by the duck's luggage, the cop apprehends the duo. At the courthouse Porky gets let off by paying a small fine, but Daffy's antics lead to another hefty fine.

Now fed up, Porky seeks revenge by gifting Daffy a present. He tosses the item quickly into the crowded trunk, tricking the duck into launching himself with his own luggage upon opening it. A victorious Porky leaves in his car as Daffy opens his gift: a hitchhiker's thumb. Daffy naively uses the thumb, to no avail as the season passes into winter. The cartoon ends with a freezing Daffy nursing his bruised thumb, a victim of his own folly.
