= Road to Andalay =

- Directed by: Friz Freleng; Hawley Pratt (co-director)
- Story by: John Dunn
- Produced by: David H. DePatie; Friz Freleng
- Starring: Mel Blanc
- Edited by: Lee Gunther
- Music by: Bill Lava
- Animation by: Norman McCabe; Don Williams; Bob Matz
- Layouts by: Homer Jonas (assistant layout)
- Backgrounds by: Tom O'Loughlin
- Color process: Technicolor
- Production company: DePatie–Freleng Enterprises
- Distributed by: Warner Bros. Pictures; The Vitaphone Corporation
- Release date: December 26, 1964
- Language: English

Road to Andalay is a 1964 Warner Bros. Merrie Melodies animated short directed by Friz Freleng and Hawley Pratt. The short was released on December 26, 1964, and is one of the last shorts to feature Speedy Gonzales and Sylvester.

In this film, Sylvester acquires a falcon and uses it against Speedy.

== Plot ==
Speedy Gonzales and Sylvester are chasing around. Speedy scares Sylvester and forces him to fall off the edge.

In an attempt to capture Speedy Gonzales, Sylvester goes to the Pet Shop to get a secret weapon. Sylvester acquires a hunting bird, a falcon named Malcolm Falcon, with disastrous results. Malcolm gets upset with Sylvester and proceeds to peck his head. Sylvester tells Malcolm to save it. Speedy comes up to ask, "Hello Pussycats, what you got in the bag?" Sylvester answers by releasing the falcon.

Malcolm tries to catch the mouse but misses. A plane flies by and sucks the falcon in. Sylvester helps the falcon recover and Malcolm pecks on Sylvester's head again.

Speedy tells Sylvester that he has a secret underneath his hat. As Sylvester tries to guess what it is underneath Speedy's hat. Sylvester talks to himself while the falcon brings him a stick of dynamite. After the explosion Malcolm pecks on Sylvester's head once more.

Malcolm tries to get the mouse again, but Speedy puts salt on the falcon's tail. To prove to Malcolm that's just a superstition, Sylvester puts the salt on his own tail. Speedy then tells them to wag their tails. The falcon wiggles his tail and it comes off, then the cat's tail wiggles and comes off, the latter of which Speedy finds hilarious. Sylvester and Malcolm then head back to town to get glue to put their tails back on. While laughing at the sight, Speedy is unaware that salt is pouring on his tail, until it also falls off. Chasing after Sylvester and Malcom, he cries "Amigos, wait, wait, save some glue for me", and the short fades out.

== Crew ==
- Co-Director: Hawley Pratt
- Story: John Dunn
- Animation: Norm McCabe, Don Williams, Bob Matz
- Assistant Layout: Homer Jonas
- Background: Tom O'Loughlin
- Camera: John Burton, Jr.
- Film Editor: Lee Gunther
- Production Manager: Bill Orcutt
- Voice Characterizations: Mel Blanc
- Music: Bill Lava
- Produced by: David H. DePatie & Friz Freleng
- Directed by: Friz Freleng

== Home media ==
This short is available on the Looney Tunes Collector's Choice: Volume 4 Blu-ray.
