= Suppressed Duck =

- Title card
- Directed by: Robert McKimson
- Story by: David Detiege
- Produced by: David H. DePatie; Friz Freleng
- Starring: Mel Blanc
- Edited by: Lee Gunther
- Music by: Bill Lava
- Animation by: Bob Matz; Manny Perez; Warren Batchelder
- Layouts by: Dick Ung
- Backgrounds by: Ron Dias
- Color process: Technicolor
- Production company: DePatie–Freleng Enterprises
- Distributed by: Warner Bros. Pictures; The Vitaphone Corporation
- Release date: June 18, 1965
- Running time: 6 minutes
- Language: English

Suppressed Duck is a 1965 Warner Bros. Looney Tunes theatrical cartoon directed by Robert McKimson and written by David Detiege. The short was released on June 18, 1965, and stars Daffy Duck. It is Daffy's only solo cartoon in the DePatie–Freleng series.

This marks the final time Daffy appears solo. In the film, Daffy is a hunter in pursuit of bears. The bears are protected behind a boundary line, in an area where hunting is illegal. So Daffy tries to find ways to get to the bears without attracting the attention of the park rangers who protect them.

== Plot ==
While on a hunting trip, Daffy Duck hopes to shoot a bear. An announcement from a nearby ranger station informs him of a boundary line drawn through the "hunting area." Hunters are told to remain on one side of the boundary and bears to remain on the other side, unless they want to get shot. Daffy chases several bears to the boundary line, and a ranger keeps him from pursuing them across it. One bear taunts Daffy from his side of the line.

In order to catch this bear, Daffy devises many schemes, including using bacon to entice the bear across the boundary line, erasing the boundary line, and disguising himself as a tree. Each time, the bear outsmarts him or he is caught and reprimanded by the park ranger. In a move reminiscent of the contemporary Pink Panther animated short, "Pink Panzer", the local forestry-officials go to absurdly-extreme lengths to enforce the boundary line, as well, using various heavy weaponry like tanks and bombs to thwart Daffy's efforts to illegally cross the line to hunt the bear.

In his last attempt to catch the bear, Daffy digs a tunnel underneath the boundary line. The bear discovers his plot, traces his way to the spot where Daffy would come out, and places a small cabin of dynamite above him before hiding. Daffy digs up into the cabin, causing the dynamite to explode, leaving him mostly featherless (except for his head). He gathers up his feathers, saying he is lucky that he keeps his feathers "numbered for just such an occasion."

While re-attaching his feathers, he soon discovers that the bottom half of his feathers are missing, and he turns to see the bear wearing them as a headdress and necklace. Before he can retrieve his feathers, the ranger, having enough of Daffy's rule-breaking behavior, decides to close hunting season for the year and orders him to leave. Obviously irked, Daffy (wearing a barrel over his naked bottom half) tells the bear: "You're desthpicable. But, you haven't seen the last of me!!" As he turns to leave, the backend of the barrel falls away, revealing his plucked behind.

== See also ==
- List of American films of 1965
- List of cartoons featuring Daffy Duck

== Crew ==
- Director: Robert McKimson
- Story: David Detiege
- Animation: Bob Matz, Manny Perez, Warren Batchelder, Cliff Nordberg
- Layout: Dick Ung
- Backgrounds: Ron Dias
- Film Editor: Lee Gunther
- Voice Characterizations: Mel Blanc
- Music: Bill Lava
- Produced by: David H. DePatie and Friz Freleng

== Home media ==
Suppressed Duck is available on the Looney Tunes Super Stars' Daffy Duck: Frustrated Fowl DVD. However, it was cropped to widescreen.
