= Martian Through Georgia =

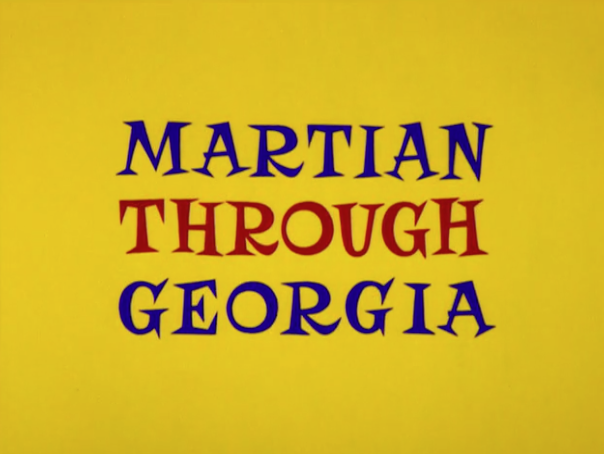
- Title card
- Directed by: Chuck Jones; Abe Levitow; Maurice Noble
- Story by: Carl Kohler; Chuck Jones
- Starring: Mel Blanc; Ed Prentiss
- Narrated by: Ed Prentiss
- Edited by: Treg Brown
- Music by: Bill Lava
- Animation by: Bob Bransford; Tom Ray; Ken Harris; Richard Thompson; Harry Love
- Layouts by: Maurice Noble
- Backgrounds by: Philip DeGuard
- Color process: Technicolor
- Production company: Warner Bros. Cartoons
- Distributed by: Warner Bros. Pictures; Vitagraph Company of America
- Release date: December 29, 1962
- Running time: 6:33
- Language: English

Martian Through Georgia is a Warner Bros. Looney Tunes cartoon, directed by Chuck Jones, Maurice Noble (credited as a co-director), and Abe Levitow, released on December 29, 1962. The title is a play on the American Civil War song "Marching Through Georgia", as well as a punny allusion to the character, setting, and basic plot premise of the short.

== Plot ==
The cartoon begins with a narrator describing the life of a bored Martian living in a perfect society on his planet. Uninterested in his advanced abilities and rejecting love, he seeks excitement elsewhere. Flying to Earth, he lands in Atlanta, where he is mistaken for a monster, leading to chaos and his imprisonment.

Confused, he tries to fit in but inadvertently causes havoc, believing he is destroying the supposed "monster". Realizing he is the monster, he contemplates suicide until the narrator reminds him of love. He returns home, realizing he is loved, and finds happiness again. The narrator concludes that with love, no one will be bored on Mars.

== Home media ==
DVD: Looney Tunes Golden Collection, Volume 6, Disc 4
