= Lighter Than Hare =

- Directed by: Friz Freleng
- Story by: Friz Freleng
- Starring: Mel Blanc
- Edited by: Treg Brown
- Music by: Milt Franklyn
- Animation by: Gerry Chiniquy; Arthur Davis; Virgil Ross
- Layouts by: Hawley Pratt
- Backgrounds by: Tom O'Loughlin
- Color process: Technicolor
- Production company: Warner Bros. Cartoons
- Distributed by: Warner Bros. Pictures
- Release date: December 17, 1960
- Running time: 7 minutes
- Language: English

Lighter Than Hare is a 1960 Warner Bros. Merrie Melodies animated short written and directed by Friz Freleng. The short was released on December 17, 1960, and stars Bugs Bunny and Yosemite Sam. The title is a play on the phrase lighter than air. It was one of three Bugs cartoons that Freleng both wrote and directed, the others being From Hare to Heir (1960) and Devil's Feud Cake (1963).

== Plot ==
The cartoon unfolds with the credits set against the backdrop of outer space, transitioning to Earth's Pacific Northwest. In this setting, a deserted Highway 17 serves as the stage for a flying saucer's descent, observed by Yosemite Sam of Outer Space from within. Bugs Bunny, amidst contemplation of relocating due to deteriorating surroundings, unknowingly becomes the target of Sam's extraterrestrial mission.

Sam dispatches Robot ZX29B to capture Bugs, but the robot's ineptitude leads to a comedic conclusion. Sam's escalating efforts, from deploying a Demolition Squad to piloting an indestructible tank, are met with unforeseen setbacks and humorous outcomes. Bugs outwits Sam at every turn, employing clever tactics and exploiting Sam's vulnerabilities to evade capture. Bugs then orchestrates a daring escape, culminating in a climactic showdown between the two adversaries that also ends humorously. After Sam deploys a "ferret robot" that could not compete with Bugs' self-made robot due to the former robot's ignorance, Sam makes a final move of threatening to blow up Bugs' home with a huge cannon. Bugs however, makes another self-made robot, dresses it like himself, puts a time bomb in it and sends it up with a false claim of surrender, leading Sam to take it into his ship.

In the aftermath, after Sam departs Earth with his mission seemingly accomplished, Bugs, enjoying the spectacle from afar, revels in his victory. The cartoon then concludes with a comedic twist as Bugs tunes into a radio broadcast.

== Cast ==
- Mel Blanc as Bugs Bunny, Yosemite Sam, Robot ZX29B, Robot Rabbit, Robot Ferret, Alien Potentate

== Home media ==
Lighter Than Hare is available uncut on the Looney Tunes Super Stars' Bugs Bunny: Hare Extraordinaire DVD. However, it was cropped to widescreen.

Lighter Than Hare was re-released on the Looney Tunes Collector's Choice: Volume 4 Blu-Ray in its original 4:3 aspect ratio.

== See also ==
- List of American films of 1960
- List of Bugs Bunny cartoons
- List of Yosemite Sam cartoons

Preceded by From Hare to Heir	Bugs Bunny Cartoons; 1960	Succeeded by The Abominable Snow Rabbit
