= Daffy's Inn Trouble =

1961 film by Robert McKimson

- Title card
- Directed by: Robert McKimson
- Story by: David Detiege
- Starring: Mel Blanc
- Edited by: Treg Brown
- Music by: Milt Franklyn
- Animation by: Warren Batchelder; Ted Bonnicksen; George Grandpré
- Layouts by: Robert Gribbroek
- Backgrounds by: William Butler
- Color process: Technicolor
- Production company: Warner Bros. Cartoons
- Distributed by: Warner Bros. Pictures
- Release date: September 23, 1961
- Running time: 6 minutes
- Country: United States
- Language: English

Daffy's Inn Trouble is a 1961 Warner Bros. Looney Tunes theatrical cartoon directed by Robert McKimson and written by David Detiege. The short was released on September 23, 1961, and stars Daffy Duck and Porky Pig.

In the film, Daffy and Porky own rival hotels in the western frontier.

== Plot ==
On the western frontier, Daffy Duck works as a janitor in Porky Pig's hotel, the Bristle Inn. Disgruntled with his job, Daffy quits and builds his own hotel, the Duck Inn Tavern, across from Porky's, but struggles to attract guests despite flashy signs. After a failed robbery at his hotel, Daffy tries to compete with Porky's successful vaudeville show by impersonating a woman. His ruse fails, leading him to try to join forces with Porky, who refuses. In an attempt to destroy the Bristle Inn with a huge boulder, Daffy misses and instead wipes out the Duck Inn Tavern; Daffy's head then turns into that of a jackass.

Daffy tries to sabotage Porky's hotel by planting dynamite under the floor, but inadvertently helps Porky strike it rich by setting off an oil gusher. Porky relocates his hotel to a better site, offering Daffy a job. Accepting, Daffy is given the opportunity to clean up, being assigned an office which is a closet full of brooms.

== Home media ==
Daffy's Inn Trouble is available on Looney Tunes Super Stars' Daffy Duck: Frustrated Fowl. However, it is cropped to widescreen.

== See also ==
- List of American films of 1961
- List of cartoons featuring Daffy Duck
- List of cartoons featuring Porky Pig
