= Goo Goo Goliath =

- Title card
- Directed by: I. Freleng
- Story by: Warren Foster
- Starring: Mel Blanc; Marian Richman
- Narrated by: Norman Nesbitt
- Music by: Carl Stalling
- Animation by: Art Davis; Manuel Perez; Ken Champin; Virgil Ross
- Layouts by: Hawley Pratt
- Backgrounds by: Irv Wyner
- Color process: Technicolor
- Production company: Warner Bros. Cartoons
- Distributed by: Warner Bros. Pictures; The Vitaphone Corporation
- Release date: September 18, 1954
- Running time: 6:56
- Language: English

Goo Goo Goliath is a Warner Bros. Merrie Melodies cartoon directed by Friz Freleng, released on September 18, 1954. The title is a pun on the onomatopoeic phrase "goo goo ga ga", often used to imitate the sound babies make before they learn to speak.

== Plot ==
Presented in the mockumentary style of previous Robert C. Bruce-narrated spot gag cartoons, the story focus on a giant baby that had been delivered by the drunken stork to a married couple. The giant baby escapes the couple from their house and wanders into the streets. The stork eventually delivers the giant baby to its correct parents but then delivers the married couple's actual baby (which he had delivered to the giants) to a zoo kangaroo.

== Home media ==
Goo Goo Goliath is available on disc 4 of the Looney Tunes Golden Collection: Volume 6 DVD set.
