= The Rebel Without Claws =

- Directed by: Friz Freleng
- Story by: Friz Freleng
- Starring: Mel Blanc
- Edited by: Treg Brown
- Music by: Milt Franklyn
- Animation by: Gerry Chiniquy; Virgil Ross; Art Davis
- Layouts by: Hawley Pratt
- Backgrounds by: Tom O'Loughlin
- Color process: Technicolor
- Production company: Warner Bros. Cartoons
- Distributed by: Warner Bros. Pictures
- Release date: July 15, 1961
- Running time: 6 minutes
- Language: English

The Rebel Without Claws is a 1961 Warner Bros. Looney Tunes cartoon short directed by Friz Freleng. The short was released on July 15, 1961, and stars Tweety and Sylvester.

The cartoon, one of many Warner Bros. cartoons set during the American Civil War, is a play on the film titled Rebel Without a Cause.

Although the American Civil War was not an unheard-of subject in the Looney Tunes/Merrie Melodies series, Rebel Without Claws is unusual in that it portrays the Confederate States Army in a sympathetic light while casting a negative focus on the Union and its Army. Likewise, the short is a remake of the 1944 short Plane Daffy, albeit with World War II references replaced by the Civil War environment and other changes.

== Story ==
The Confederates want to get an "important message" to General Robert E. Lee, but all the carrier pigeons have been shot down. The soldiers realize that Tweety is their last hope and turn to him for their mission. The Union soldiers learn of the Confederates' attempt and counter with their "Messenger Destroyer", who turns out to be none other than Sylvester. "I tawt I taw a damn Yankee tat," says Tweety just before the chase begins.

The bulk of the cartoon uses battle gags, such as Sylvester getting blown out of a cannon, Tweety momentarily tricking Sylvester into thinking Union soldiers are marching to battle (Sylvester tries to confront the canary but is blown away by Confederate soldiers), and Tweety hiding behind cannons on a fighter ship. When Sylvester tries to capture Tweety, he gets blasted by the cannons. (The gag was reused from Buccaneer Bunny.)

Eventually, Sylvester disguises himself as General Lee and grabs Tweety. The bird is taken to the firing line for execution for treason against the Union by siding with the Confederacy. He states that his only regret is that he has "but one wife to give foh my countwy" (paraphrasing Nathan Hale), to which Sylvester says that he has nine lives. But the commander and his soldiers prove incompetent — they shoot Sylvester instead! "It's a good thing I have got nine lives! With this kind of an army, I'll need 'em!"

== Crew ==
- Animation: Virgil Ross, Art Davis, Gerry Chiniquy
- Layouts: Hawley Pratt
- Backgrounds: Tom O'Loughlin
- Film Editor: Treg Brown
- Voice Characterizations: Mel Blanc
- Music: Milt Franklyn
- Written and Directed by: Friz Freleng

== Home media ==
This short is available on the Looney Tunes Collector's Choice: Volume 2 Blu-ray.

== Bibliography ==
- Friedwald, Will and Jerry Beck. "The Warner Brothers Cartoons." Scarecrow Press Inc., Metuchen, N.J., 1981. ISBN 0-8108-1396-3.

== See also ==
- List of American films of 1961

Preceded by Trip For Tat	Tweety and Sylvester cartoons 1961	Succeeded by The Last Hungry Cat
