= Dime to Retire =

- Directed by: Robert McKimson
- Story by: Sid Marcus
- Starring: Mel Blanc
- Music by: Milt Franklyn
- Animation by: Robert McKimson; Keith Darling
- Layouts by: Robert Givens
- Backgrounds by: Richard H. Thomas
- Color process: Technicolor
- Production company: Warner Bros. Cartoons
- Distributed by: Warner Bros. Pictures
- Release date: September 3, 1955
- Language: English

Dime to Retire is a 1955 Warner Bros. Looney Tunes cartoon directed by Robert McKimson. The cartoon was released on September 3, 1955, and stars Daffy Duck and Porky Pig.

== Plot ==
Daffy Duck, as a shady hotel-keeper, advertises a one-night stay in his hotel for a dime, which proves attractive for traveler Porky Pig. Daffy then orchestrates a series of disturbances in Porky's room using animals, charging Porky increasingly exorbitant fees to remove them. It starts with a mouse, escalates to a cat, and spirals out of control with a boxer dog, lion, and elephant, going full circle with the mouse again. Each pest disposal fee climbs higher until Porky is fed up and leaves without paying.

Daffy insists on impounding Porky's luggage for final non-payment. The exhaust from Porky's car inadvertently sets off explosives in his luggage (he's a blasting powder salesman), causing an explosion in Daffy's hotel. As Daffy's tailfeathers catch fire, he dashes away.
