= The Prize Pest =

1951 Looney Tunes cartoon by Robert McKimson

- Directed by: Robert McKimson
- Story by: Tedd Pierce
- Starring: Mel Blanc; Tedd Pierce (uncredited)
- Music by: Carl Stalling
- Animation by: Rod Scribner; Phil DeLara; Emery Hawkins; Charles McKimson
- Layouts by: Peter Alvarado
- Backgrounds by: Richard H. Thomas
- Color process: Technicolor
- Production company: Warner Bros. Cartoons
- Distributed by: Warner Bros. Pictures; The Vitaphone Corporation
- Release date: December 22, 1951 (USA)
- Running time: 7 minutes
- Language: English

The Prize Pest is a 1951 Warner Bros. Looney Tunes cartoon directed by Robert McKimson, and written by Tedd Pierce. The cartoon was released on December 22, 1951, and stars Daffy Duck and Porky Pig.

== Plot ==
After winning a prize from a radio show, Porky Pig receives an unexpected house guest — Daffy Duck — who refuses to leave. Daffy claims to have a split personality, turning sweet when treated kindly and monstrous when mistreated. Falling for Daffy's ruse, Porky agrees to serve him, but secretly plans to call the authorities. Daffy, however, outsmarts Porky by impersonating the phone.

After discovering that Daffy was scaring him with the prank of scaring people, to get revenge and get rid of him, Porky dresses up in a monstrous Halloween costume. Daffy's reaction is so extreme that he flees, hiding back in the gift box he arrived in. In a twist, Porky managed to scare away the duck, while he mocks Daffy's cowardice, he looks in the mirror and scares himself, that he admits to himself that he is a coward, just like Daffy.
