= Crockett-Doodle-Do =

1960 short film

- Directed by: Robert McKimson
- Story by: Tedd Pierce
- Starring: Mel Blanc
- Edited by: Treg Brown
- Music by: Milt Franklyn
- Animation by: Warren Batchelder; Ted Bonnicksen; George Grandpre; Tom Ray; Harry Love (effects animation)
- Layouts by: Bob Givens
- Backgrounds by: Bob Singer
- Color process: Technicolor
- Production company: Warner Bros. Cartoons
- Distributed by: Warner Bros. Pictures
- Release date: June 25, 1960
- Language: English

Crockett-Doodle-Do is an animated Warner Bros. Merrie Melodies cartoon, directed by Robert McKimson and written by Tedd Pierce. The short was released on June 25, 1960, and stars Foghorn Leghorn and Egghead Jr.

The film was one of the most well-known Merrie Melodies shorts and marked Egghead Jr.'s final appearance in a Warner Bros. cartoon. The title is a reference to Davy Crockett.

== Plot ==
Foghorn is going for a hike in the woods when he notices Egghead Jr. reading Basic Research in the Physical Sciences by Prof. Newt Ronn. Foghorn takes him out in the woods to learn scouting and woodcraft. He tries to light a friction fire with a spindle drill, but Egghead breaks off a twig, strikes it like a match on his buttock, and lights the fire for him. Foghorn calls the act impossible and tries it for himself, and sets his own tail on fire.

While Egghead returns to his book, Foghorn carves a duck call. When he blows it, a pig comes running, knocking Foghorn off his feet and into a tree. Egghead carves his own call, which brings three bobbysoxer ducks to swoon over him. Foghorn then tries to send a smoke signal; he burns a hole in his blanket. Egghead signals back with a neatly typed and signed message in his smoke.

Foghorn rigs a watering can in a tree and tries to fool Egghead with an Indian rain dance. Egghead folds a paper airplane and uses it to seed a small cloud with dry ice, making actual rain and strike Foghorn with lightning, leaving him featherless.

Foghorn shows him how to set up a box trap, but Egghead builds a snare trap. Foghorn scoffs and demonstrates how the snare will not work. He inadvertently sets off a Rube Goldberg-esque trap that springs the rooster up into the air, bounces him off a tree branch, launches him through a chute, down a hollow tree, and deposits him back at the snare, which triggers and hangs Foghorn upside-down by his feet. Beaten, Foghorn asks him if he has any more of "those long-haired books."

== Reception ==
Crockett-Doodle-Do was a popular Looney Tunes short, according to The 100 Greatest Looney Tunes Cartoons.
