= The Iceman Ducketh =

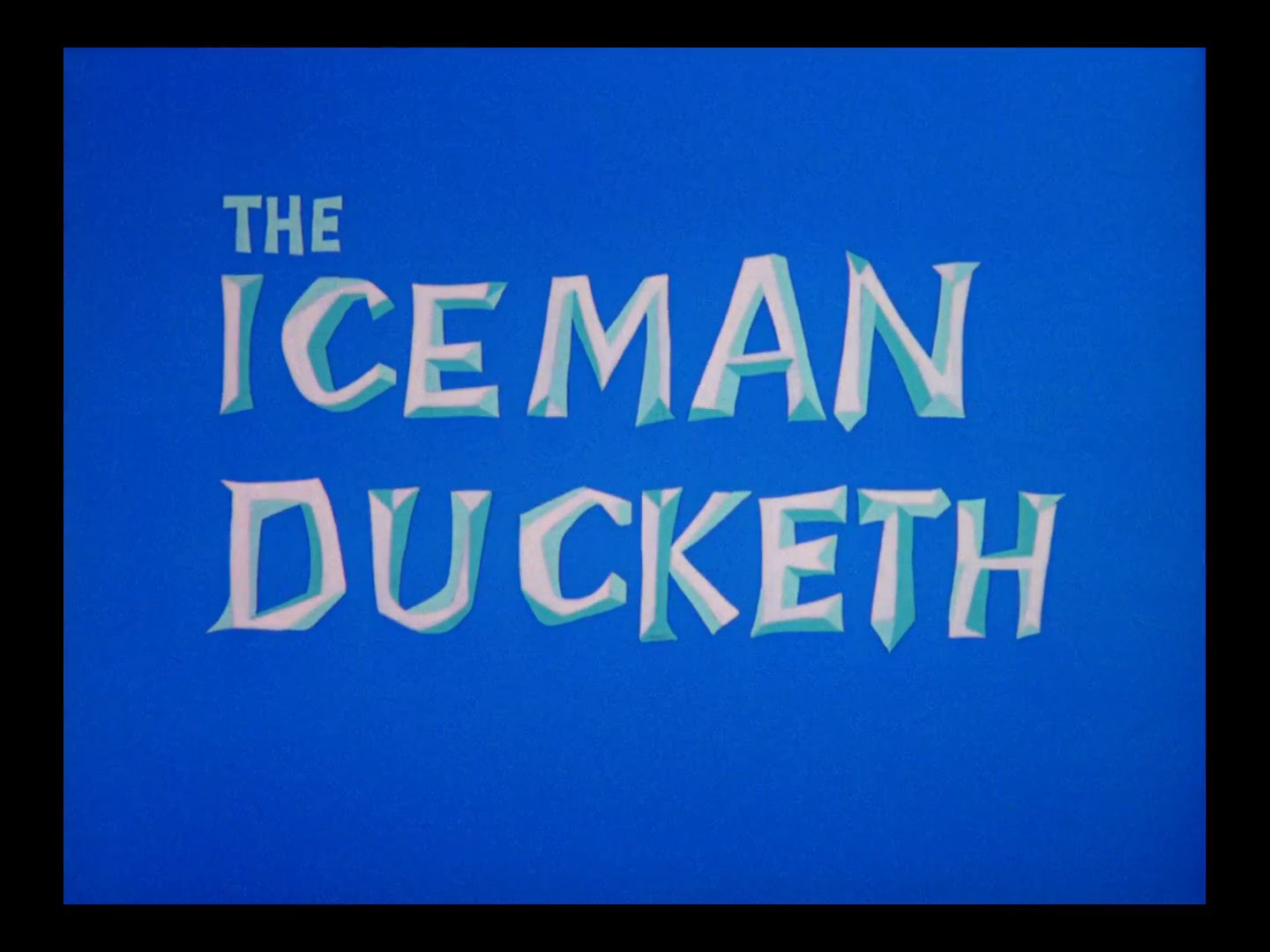
- Title card
- Directed by: Phil Monroe; Maurice Noble
- Story by: John Dunn
- Starring: Mel Blanc
- Edited by: Treg Brown
- Music by: Bill Lava
- Animation by: Bob Bransford; Tom Ray; Ken Harris; Richard Thompson; Bob Matz; Alex Ignatiev; Harry Love (effects)
- Layouts by: Bob Givens
- Backgrounds by: William Butler
- Color process: Technicolor
- Production company: Warner Bros. Cartoons
- Distributed by: Warner Bros. Pictures; Vitaphone
- Release date: May 16, 1964 (USA)
- Running time: 6 minutes
- Language: English

The Iceman Ducketh is a 1964 Warner Bros. Looney Tunes theatrical cartoon directed by Phil Monroe and Maurice Noble, with a story by John Dunn. The short was released on May 16, 1964, and stars Bugs Bunny and Daffy Duck. It was the penultimate Warner Bros. theatrical cartoon to feature Bugs Bunny and the last Warner Bros. theatrical cartoon to feature Bugs and Daffy together until Cartoon All-Stars to the Rescue and the Looney Tunes Short, Box-Office Bunny in 1991, and the last that the Chuck Jones unit worked on, though Chuck Jones himself was fired at an early stage of production and replaced by Monroe (by the time it was released, Jones had already produced two cartoons at his new studio, Sib-Tower 12 Productions). The title is a pun on Eugene O'Neill's 1946 theatrical play The Iceman Cometh, which would later be adapted into a movie.

== Plot ==
At a trading post up in the Klondike, many fur trappers have come in to trade in their furs for big bucks after a successful fur trapping season. When Daffy Duck sees Garcon, the manager of the trading post, giving money to the last fur trapper, he checks in to ask if trading in furs for money is true. Garcon says it is true, but warns Daffy that fur trapping season is over due to the approaching winter, just as he decides to catch some fur for himself ignoring Garcon's warning.

Scoffing at the idea of winter, Daffy vows to catch a fur just as winter sets in just as suddenly. Bugs Bunny makes a snow rabbit, telling the audience it will fool Daffy for a while, while he makes his getaway. Daffy comes up to the snow rabbit and warns him not to move or be pulverized. When the coal nose of the snow rabbit falls off, Daffy takes that as movement and proceeds to whack the snow rabbit to pieces until he hits a hibernating bear, whom the snow rabbit was built over. Angry at having his hibernation disturbed, the bear claws Daffy, who runs off thinking the bear missed until he falls to pieces.

Just as Bugs is tutting off Daffy's misfortune, Daffy catches up and pokes his rifle at him. When Bugs asks Daffy if he has got some antipathy towards him, Daffy states he is only after the fur, of which he finds Bugs' to be the softest he has felt. As Bugs starts bragging about getting his suits from "the same tailor as the Duke of Windsor," Daffy just states he is not interested in any "sales pitch" (Ken Harris animates this scene—his last work at Warner's). Daffy refuses to give Bugs a sporting chance and threatens to shoot him in the neck, but Bugs kisses him, plugs up his gun with his carrot and runs away. Daffy tries to shoot Bugs, but the gun expands from the carrot; as Daffy tries to dislodge the carrot, the gun explodes in his face. Daffy then snarls: "Ooooh, I LOVE him!"

Later, Daffy ignores a sign warning him there are hibernating animals, vowing that "I know one that isn't gonna get much sleep!" No sooner does he say that than he comes across an alarm clock, that rings and wakes up another hibernating bear. Thinking Daffy to be responsible for the rude awakening, the bear chases him straight into a cave where Bugs directs them. Bugs then seals up the cave entrance with a boulder, leaving the bear to pummel Daffy, who finally exits the cave looking a little worse for wear.

Further on, Bugs has come across a sign warning him that he is in avalanche territory just as Daffy comes running up. Bugs manages to inform him of where they are and instructs him to follow on tiptoe. Daffy obliges and, after a few seconds, asks Bugs if it is okay to talk yet. Bugs pretends not to hear, prompting Daffy to ask again in his loudest whisper. When Bugs again pretends not to hear, Daffy gets mad enough to simply shout his question, causing snow to fall all over him. Bugs informs him that it still is not safe then and Daffy sarcastically thanks him.

Back at his hole, Bugs goes down for a rest just as Daffy comes up with dynamite. As Daffy trails out the wire, Bugs moves the hole so he secretly places the dynamite next to Daffy, just as Daffy prepares a detonator ("I love doing this, especially because I DESPISE him!"). After the dynamite explodes on Daffy, he states "I think I'm going to cry."

Bugs manages to take refuge in a tree, forcing Daffy to put firewood around the stump in an attempt to smoke him out, but the fire melts the snow on the tree, causing it to fall on Daffy and freeze him in an ice statue. Bugs takes this event to make his getaway, but Daffy manages to free himself and get blasted by his own gun while trying to free it from the ice statue ("Say, whose side are you on, fella?"). Using skis, Daffy pursues Bugs to the lake, firing his gun as he goes. Bugs creates an "invisible shield" by throwing out a bucket of water, which Daffy crashes into. This gag spoofs Colgate commercials of the early 1960s ("I saw a guy do this in a toothpaste ad once").

Up a hill, Daffy drops a pebble that rolls into a giant snowball, in the hopes it will engulf Bugs. The snowball misses Bugs by a few inches, but engulfs three hibernating bears in the cave Bugs had earlier trapped Daffy in, and falls out the other end of the cave. After a brief boulder catapult gag, similar to those from the Wile E. Coyote and Road Runner cartoons, the snowball lands on Daffy, who runs up a tree just as the angry bears threaten to maul him.

Later that night, Bugs decides to turn in for winter hibernation and bids Daffy and the bears goodnight. Daffy, now looking blue from the cold and worse for wear from an unseen fight with the bears (that might have taken place during the blackout between this scene and the snowball gag), simply curses over the mess he has gotten himself into while still clinging to the treetop.

== Critics' reception ==
Leonard Maltin found that director Phil Monroe was unable to improve upon weak storytelling.

The Bugs Bunny Video Guide complains about the near-senseless plot, expresses disappointment with the characterizations (considering Daffy especially badly wasted), and rates this cartoon one star out of four.

== Home media ==
"The Iceman Ducketh" is available, uncensored and uncut, on the Looney Tunes Super Stars' Daffy Duck: Frustrated Fowl DVD. However, it was cropped to widescreen.

== See also ==
- List of American films of 1964
- List of Daffy Duck cartoons
- List of Bugs Bunny cartoons

Preceded by Dr. Devil and Mr. Hare	Bugs Bunny Cartoons; 1964	Succeeded by False Hare
