= Gone Batty =

- Title card
- Directed by: Robert McKimson
- Story by: Sid Marcus; Ben Washam
- Starring: Mel Blanc
- Narrated by: Robert C. Bruce
- Music by: Carl Stalling
- Animation by: Charles McKimson; Herman Cohen; Rod Scribner; Phil DeLara
- Layouts by: Robert Givens
- Backgrounds by: Richard H. Thomas
- Color process: Technicolor
- Production company: Warner Bros. Cartoons
- Distributed by: Warner Bros. Pictures; The Vitaphone Corporation
- Release date: September 4, 1954
- Running time: 6:47
- Language: English

Gone Batty is a Warner Bros. Looney Tunes animated cartoon short directed by Robert McKimson, released on September 4, 1954. The title (which means to go insane) is a direct allusion to the basic plot premise.

This is the second Looney Tunes short to use baseball as its main theme following Baseball Bugs.

== Plot ==
Bobo, the elephant mascot for the Sweetwater Shnooks baseball team, steps up when his teammates are knocked out (literally) by the Greenville Goons who resort to dirty tactics during the game. Despite protests, Bobo is allowed to play and astonishingly leads his team to victory with a final score of 168 runs to the Goons' 167.
