= Paying the Piper =

- Directed by: Robert McKimson
- Story by: Warren Foster
- Starring: Mel Blanc
- Music by: Carl Stalling
- Animation by: Manny Gould; John Carey; Charles McKimson; Phil De Lara; Fred Abranz (uncredited)
- Layouts by: Cornett Wood
- Backgrounds by: Richard H. Thomas
- Color process: Technicolor
- Production company: Warner Bros. Cartoons
- Distributed by: Warner Bros. Pictures; The Vitaphone Corporation
- Release date: March 12, 1949
- Running time: 7:06
- Language: English

Paying the Piper is a 1949 Warner Bros. Looney Tunes cartoon directed by Robert McKimson. The short was released on March 12, 1949, and stars Porky Pig. It is the first appearance of the Supreme Cat, a recurring character in McKimson's films and is named as such in this film.

It is a parody of the fairy tale The Pied Piper and involves Porky trying to stop a cat that disguises himself as the last rat to bring the rats back for the local cats; later, Porky has to get the reward money owed to him for ridding the town of the rats back from the cat. It has Porky in the role of the piper character.

== Plot ==
The people of the town of Hamelin are celebrating the high rat population being driven from the town. The cats, upon hearing this news, understand that it does not bode well for them as it means their main food source is gone. In panic, they decide to go to the Supreme Cat for a solution to the problem. Supreme tells the crowd of cats that his plan is to get the rats back by sabotaging Porky's receipt of reward money. The mayor made a deal with Porky - if there is one rat left in the town, Porky does not get paid. Supreme Cat dons a rat suit.

As Porky is about to receive his reward money, Supreme struts into the mayor's office. The mayor reminds Porky that he will not be receiving the money until all rats are gone. Supreme does a Last of the Mohicans impression.

Around the town, Supreme torments Porky by appearing as himself and thwarting the piper's attempts to draw out the 'last rat'. Dressed as the rat, he slaps Porky with his tail and pretends to be mesmerized by his clarinet playing (the tune is Little Brown Jug).

Finally, Porky gets hold of the rat suit and Supreme allows it to be torn from him. Porky does not realize it is a costume and that a cat was inside. He takes it back to the town hall and presents it to the mayor: "there's what's left of the last rat".

The mayor goes to the safe to retrieve the reward money, but Supreme is within the safe with money bag in hand. He runs off and Porky gives chase. Supreme takes refuge behind a fence. To coax the cat out, Porky devises a trick which involves him announcing that since he will not be receiving the reward, he will bring back all the rats.

Porky proceeds to play his clarinet and also plays a record that is conveniently titled, Rat Stampede - To Fool Cats On The Other Side Of Fences. This works and Supreme, thrilled that the rats have returned, dashes out, only to be tripped up by Porky, who grabs the money bag and skips off, playing his clarinet.

== Home media ==
This short is available on disc 2 of the Looney Tunes Golden Collection: Volume 5 DVD set.

== See also ==
- Porky Pig filmography
- Looney Tunes and Merrie Melodies filmography (1940–1949)
