= Phil Monroe =

American animator (1916–1988)

- Born: October 31, 1916; Long Beach, California, U.S.
- Died: July 13, 1988 (aged 71); Los Angeles, California, U.S.
- Other name: Philip Monroe
- Occupations: Animator, director
- Years active: 1933–1983
- Employers: Warner Bros. Cartoons (1933–1950, 1959–1963); John Sutherland Productions (1950–1951); Cascade Studios (1951, 1953–1954); Sketchbook (1951); UPA (1951–1953); Ray Patin Productions (1953–1959); DePatie-Freleng (1963-1979); Chuck Jones Productions (1979-1981); Warner Bros. Animation (1981–1983)

Philip Monroe (October 31, 1916 – July 13, 1988) was an American animator and director best known for working for Warner Bros. Cartoons under the supervision of Chuck Jones. Monroe had also worked for UPA.

== Career ==
Monroe started working at Leon Schlesinger Productions (the company later known as Warner Bros. Cartoons) in June 1933. He was initially only an inbetweener. The studio at this point was loosely-enough organized to allow opportunities of rapid advancement for ambitious young inbetweeners, like Monroe. According to a later interview with Monroe, "some guys" were content to be "inbetweeners all their lives", while others searched for opportunities to do something else and move up in the studio's hierarchy. Monroe himself managed to befriend animator Robert McKimson and served as his inbetweener for a while. He was soon promoted to become McKimson's assistant. By the end of 1935, Monroe had been promoted again and started serving as an animator in his own right.

Monroe is best known as an animator for Chuck Jones, but would also work with Friz Freleng, Bob Clampett and Frank Tashlin in the 1940s. He would be drafted into the United States Army Air Forces in 1943, but returned to the studio in 1946. Jones' considered him one of his favorite animators, along with Ken Harris, Ben Washam and Abe Levitow. He then went to John Sutherland Productions in 1950. In 1951, Monroe left for UPA, working under the supervision of John Hubley and Pete Burness. He eventually left UPA for political reasons, and in 1959 went back to Warners to head their commercial department, where he directed commercials featuring Charlie the Tuna. He actually had already been working for commercials for companies such as Cascade Studios and Ray Patin Productions. He eventually went back into the entertainment department as an animator in Chuck Jones' unit, and was chosen to finish two shorts (The Iceman Ducketh, Woolen Under Where) under Jones' unit after Jones himself was fired. After Warner Bros. Cartoons closed in 1963, Monroe did many animation stints until he ended up at Chuck Jones Productions. He would continue animating for Jones until his death. He also went to Warner Bros. Animation, teaming up, again, with Freleng and Jones, on The Bugs Bunny/Road Runner Movie, The Looney, Looney, Looney Bugs Bunny Movie, and Daffy Duck's Fantastic Island.

Monroe died from pancreatic cancer on July 13, 1988, aged 71.

== Sources ==
- Barrier, Michael (2003), "Warner Bros., 1933-1940", Hollywood Cartoons: American Animation in Its Golden Age, Oxford University Press, ISBN 978-0199839223
