= Bob Matz =

American animator

Robert H. Matz (July 8, 1912 – March 28, 2003) was an American animator. He worked on various animated shorts, films, and television projects, such as Looney Tunes, Merrie Melodies, The Pink Panther, Peanuts Cartoons, and The Transformers: The Movie.

== Filmography ==
=== 1957 ===
- Crusader Rabbit (TV series) (13 episodes)
- Three Little Bops (short)

=== 1960–1961 ===
- The Bugs Bunny Show (TV series) (2 episodes)
  - Episode #1.18 (1961)
  - Episode #1.2 (1960)

=== 1961 ===
- Prince Violent (short)
- The Last Hungry Cat (short)
- The Pied Piper of Guadalupe (short)

=== 1962 ===
- Crows' Feat (short)
- Honey's Money (short)
- Mexican Boarders (short)
- Quackodile Tears (short)
- Shishkabugs (short)
- The Jet Cage (short)

=== 1963 ===
- Chili Weather (short)
- Devil's Feud Cake (short)
- Mexican Cat Dance (short)
- Philbert (Three's a Crowd) (short)
- The Pink Panther (main titles - uncredited)
- The Unmentionables (short)
