= Robert Gribbroek =

American animator (1906–1971)

Robert Gribbroek (March 16, 1906 – October 13, 1971) was an American animator. He served as a layout artist and background painter at the Warner Bros. Cartoons from 1945 until 1964. He was first credited in Chuck Jones' Lost and Foundling (1944), and he worked mainly for Jones until 1950, in which he left the studio and was replaced by Maurice Noble. Following a three-year absence, Gribbroek re-emerged in 1953, initially installed within his previous position as Jones' layout man. Gribbroek was reallocated, however, to Robert McKimson's then-recently reopened unit in 1954, in which he would remain until the studio's closure in 1963.

After the Warner's cartoon unit closed, he rejoined Jones at the MGM cartoon department. He retired in 1965. His last original credited work was as a layout artist on the 1966 Spanish animated feature El mago de los sueños (though Gribbroek would be credited on later Warner compilation specials/features, for his work on the classic Warner cartoons).

Gribbroek was born near Rochester, New York to Edward C. and Ada O. Gribbroek but studied art in Taos, New Mexico, where he later died in 1971, at the age of 65.
