= Treg Brown =

American motion picture sound editor (1899–1984)

- Born: Tregoweth Edmond Brown; November 4, 1899; Gilbert, Minnesota, U.S.
- Died: April 28, 1984 (aged 84); Irvine, California, U.S.
- Occupation: Sound editor
- Years active: 1936–1965
- Known for: Classic sound effects in the Warner Bros. library Discovering voice actor Mel Blanc

Tregoweth Edmond "Treg" Brown (November 4, 1899 – April 28, 1984) was an American motion picture sound editor who was responsible for conceiving, recording and selecting the sound effects library in Warner Bros.' Looney Tunes and Merrie Melodies cartoons from 1936 to 1963. Before that, he worked with Cecil B. DeMille. Adding to this, he also gave fellow Warner Bros. voice actor Mel Blanc his big break. He also won the 1966 Academy Award for Sound Effects for his work on the film The Great Race.

Reputedly, he vaguely resembled Blanc and was a musician who once played jazz guitar with Red Nichols and his Five Pennies. In the Warner Bros. cartoon One Froggy Evening (1955), the skyscraper into which Michigan J. Frog is entombed is named the "Tregoweth Brown Building".

Paying tribute to Brown's comedic aural contributions to classic cartoons, Blanc opined: "The real challenge for any animated-film sound-effects man wasn't to simulate realism but to defy it. Much Warner's cartoon hilarity stemmed from Brown's outlandish imagination. Why always apply the fitting sound effect, went his thinking, when something completely incongruous would be so much funnier?"
