= Looney Tunes and Merrie Melodies filmography (1960–1969) =

A total of 146 theatrical animated shorts released by Warner Bros. Pictures and its successor Warner Bros.–Seven Arts under the Looney Tunes (LT) and Merrie Melodies (MM) banners between the years of 1960 and 1969 (144 official and 2 cut downs).

== Series overview ==
Year	Shorts	Originally released	
Year	Shorts	First released	Last released
1960	20	January 9, 1960	December 17, 1960
1961	19	January 7, 1961	December 30, 1961
1962	16	January 20, 1962	December 29, 1962
1963	16	January 9, 1963	December 28, 1963
1964	13	January 18, 1964	December 26, 1964
1965	19 (Note: Two additional shorts (Zip Zip Hooray! and Road Runner a Go-Go) were produced by DePatie–Freleng Enterprises, which reused footage from Chuck Jones' 1962 unsold television pilot Adventures of the Road Runner, with the original audio kept intact. Despite this, these cartoons are not officially part of the Looney Tunes/Merrie Melodies filmography. Unofficially, this would bring 1965 to 21 cartoons, and the entire filmography to 1001 shorts as opposed to 999.)	January 1, 1965	December 25, 1965
1966	15	January 1, 1966	December 3, 1966
1967	10	January 21, 1967	December 9, 1967
1968	10	January 13, 1968	November 9, 1968
1969	6	January 25, 1969	September 20, 1969

== 1960 ==
No. overall	No. in year	Title	Series	Directed by	Story by	Animated by	Recurring characters	Original release date	Official DVD/Blu-Ray Availability
856	1	Fastest with the Mostest	LT	Chuck Jones	N/A	Ken Harris, Richard Thompson, Ben Washam & Keith Darling	Wile E. Coyote and the Road Runner	January 9, 1960	Blu-Ray: Collector's Vault: Vol. 2
The eternal chase between Wile E. Coyote and the Road Runner continues.
857	2	West of the Pesos	MM	Robert McKimson	Tedd Pierce	Tom Ray, George Grandpré, Ted Bonnicksen & Warren Batchelder	Speedy Gonzales; Sylvester	January 23, 1960	DVD: Golden Collection: Vol. 4
Speedy Gonzales saves mice from a laboratory guarded by Sylvester.
858	3	Horse Hare	LT	Friz Freleng	Michael Maltese	Gerry Chiniquy, Virgil Ross & Arthur Davis	Bugs Bunny; Yosemite Sam	February 13, 1960	Blu-Ray: Collector's Vault: Vol. 3
Bugs Bunny serves in the United States Cavalry, where he guards and defends Fort Lariat against Renegade Sam and his Native American army.
859	4	Wild Wild World	MM	Robert McKimson	Tedd Pierce	George Grandpré, Ted Bonnicksen, Warren Batchelder & Tom Ray	N/A (one-shot cartoon)	February 27, 1960	DVD: Golden Collection: Vol. 6 (extra, unrestored)
Cave Darroway presents a recently discovered "film documentary of the Geo-Goshical Year 75,000,000 B.C.".
860	5	Goldimouse and the Three Cats	LT	Friz Freleng	Michael Maltese	Virgil Ross, Arthur Davis & Gerry Chiniquy	Sylvester; Sylvester Jr.	March 19, 1960	DVD: Golden Collection: Vol. 5 DVD: Super Stars' Sylvester & Hippety Hopper; Blu-Ray: Collector's Vault: Vol. 3
A re-telling of "Goldilocks and the Three Bears", but with a mouse as a stand-in for Goldilocks, and Sylvester, his wife, and his son Sylvester Jr. as stand-ins for the three bears.
861	6	Person to Bunny	MM	Friz Freleng	Michael Maltese	Arthur Davis, Gerry Chiniquy & Virgil Ross	Bugs Bunny; Daffy Duck; Elmer Fudd	April 1, 1960	DVD: Super Stars' Daffy Duck (cropped to 16:9 widescreen); Blu-Ray: Bugs Bunny 80th Anniversary Collection (original 4:3 aspect ratio)
Bugs Bunny is being interviewed on a TV show, but Daffy Duck wants to be part of the show, and Elmer Fudd chases down Bugs when he mocks him on live TV. Note: Final cartoon where Elmer Fudd is voiced by Arthur Q. Bryan, who died in 1959 from a heart attack.
862	7	Who Scent You?	LT	Chuck Jones	Michael Maltese	Richard Thompson, Ken Harris, Ben Washam & Keith Darling	Pepé Le Pew; Penelope Pussycat	April 23, 1960	DVD: Super Stars' Pepé Le Pew
Penelope Pussycat tries to sneak aboard a French ocean liner, getting a white stripe on her back as she goes under the fence. Pepé Le Pew, seeing her from the coast, races aboard to pursue her.
863	8	Hyde and Go Tweet	MM	Friz Freleng	N/A	Arthur Davis, Gerry Chiniquy & Virgil Ross	Tweety; Sylvester	May 14, 1960	Blu-Ray: Collector's Choice: Vol. 4
Sylvester's attempts to eat Tweety prove much harder when he keeps turning into a seven-foot monster.
864	9	Rabbit's Feat	LT	Chuck Jones	N/A	Ken Harris & Richard Thompson	Bugs Bunny; Wile E. Coyote	June 4, 1960	Blu-Ray: Bugs Bunny 80th Anniversary Collection
Wile E. Coyote sets up a picnic to lure and eat Bugs Bunny.
865	10	Crockett-Doodle-Do	MM	Robert McKimson	Tedd Pierce	Warren Batchelder, Tom Ray, George Grandpré & Ted Bonnicksen	Foghorn Leghorn; Egghead Jr.	June 25, 1960	DVD: Super Stars' Foghorn Leghorn & Friends
Foghorn Leghorn goes out for a day in the woods, and takes bookworm Egghead Jr. out with him.
866	11	Mouse and Garden	LT	Friz Freleng	N/A	Gerry Chiniquy, Arthur Davis & Virgil Ross	Sylvester; Sam Cat	July 16, 1960	DVD: Golden Collection: Vol. 4 Blu-Ray/DVD: Platinum Collection: Vol. 3
Sylvester and Sam Cat both compete to eat a mouse. Note: Nominated for the Academy Award for Best Animated Short Film in 1961.
867	12	Ready, Woolen and Able	MM	Chuck Jones	Michael Maltese	Ken Harris, Richard Thompson & Ben Washam	Ralph Wolf and Sam Sheepdog	July 30, 1960	Blu-Ray: Collector's Vault: Vol. 1
Ralph Wolf and Sam Sheepdog go about their usual 9-to-5 job of capturing sheep and stopping the capture of sheep respectively.
868	13	Mice Follies	LT	Robert McKimson	Tedd Pierce	George Grandpré, Ted Bonnicksen, Warren Batchelder & Tom Ray	Ralph Crumden; Ned Morton; Alice Crumden; Trixie Morton	August 20, 1960	Blu-Ray/DVD: Mouse Chronicles (extra, unrestored); Blu-Ray: Collector's Vault: Vol. 3 (restored)
Another mouse-themed parody of The Honeymooners.
869	14	From Hare to Heir	MM	Friz Freleng	Friz Freleng	Arthur Davis, Gerry Chiniquy & Virgil Ross	Bugs Bunny; Yosemite Sam	September 3, 1960	DVD: Super Stars' Bugs Bunny (cropped to 16:9 widescreen); Blu-Ray: Bugs Bunny 80th Anniversary Collection (original 4:3 aspect ratio)
Bugs Bunny offers Yosemite Sam a lot of money on the condition he controls his temper.
870	15	The Dixie Fryer	MM	Robert McKimson	Tedd Pierce	Ted Bonnicksen, Warren Batchelder, Tom Ray & George Grandpré	Foghorn Leghorn; Pappy and Elvis	September 24, 1960	Blu-Ray: Collector's Vault: Vol. 1
Foghorn Leghorn goes up against a father-son chickenhawk duo when he goes south for the winter.
871	16	Hopalong Casualty	LT	Chuck Jones	Chuck Jones	Tom Ray, Ken Harris, Richard Thompson & Bob Bransford	Wile E. Coyote and the Road Runner	October 8, 1960	Blu-Ray: Collector's Choice: Vol. 4
Wile E. Coyote will never give up his chase to capture the Road Runner.
872	17	Trip for Tat	MM	Friz Freleng	Michael Maltese	Gerry Chiniquy, Arthur Davis & Virgil Ross	Tweety; Sylvester; Granny	October 29, 1960	N/A
A clip show in which Sylvester tries to catch Tweety across various old cartoon clips.
873	18	Dog Gone People	MM	Robert McKimson	Tedd Pierce	Warren Batchelder, George Grandpré, Ted Bonnicksen & Tom Ray	Elmer Fudd	November 12, 1960	DVD: Super Stars' Porky & Friends
Elmer Fudd must watch over his boss' snooty dog, who thinks he's a person.
874	19	High Note	LT	Chuck Jones	Michael Maltese	Richard Thompson & Ken Harris	N/A (one-shot cartoon)	December 3, 1960	DVD: Warner Bros. Home Entertainment Academy Awards Animation Collection; Blu-Ray/DVD: Platinum Collection: Vol. 3
A drunken musical note wanders around a page of sheet music. Note: Nominated for the Academy Award for Best Animated Short Film in 1961.
875	20	Lighter Than Hare	MM	Friz Freleng	Friz Freleng	Virgil Ross, Arthur Davis & Gerry Chiniquy	Bugs Bunny; Yosemite Sam	December 17, 1960	DVD: Super Stars' Bugs Bunny (cropped to 16:9 widescreen); Blu-Ray: Collector's Choice: Vol. 4 (extra, original 4:3 aspect ratio)
Yosemite Sam plays an alien invader who plans to take Bugs Bunny back to his home planet by force.

== 1961 ==
No. overall	No. in year	Title	Series	Directed by	Story by	Animated by	Recurring characters	Original release date	Official DVD/Blu-Ray Availability
876	1	Cannery Woe	LT	Robert McKimson	Tedd Pierce	George Grandpré, Ted Bonnicksen, Warren Batchelder & Tom Ray; Harry Love (effects)	Speedy Gonzales; Sylvester; Jose and Manuel	January 7, 1961	DVD: Golden Collection: Vol. 4
Mayor Raton is re-running for mayor, and hosts a fiesta to get people interested. But his cheese supply is caught off by the arrival of Sylvester guarding it, so Jose and Manuel summon Speedy Gonzales to get cheese for them.
877	2	Zip 'N Snort	MM	Chuck Jones	Chuck Jones	Richard Thompson, Bob Bransford, Tom Ray & Ken Harris	Wile E. Coyote and the Road Runner	January 21, 1961	Blu-Ray: Collector's Vault: Vol. 1
Wile E. Coyote keeps trying (and failing) to catch the Road Runner.
878	3	Hoppy Daze	LT	Robert McKimson	Tedd Pierce	Ted Bonnicksen, Warren Batchelder, Tom Ray & George Grandpré; Harry Love (effects)	Hippety Hopper; Sylvester	February 11, 1961	DVD: Super Stars' Sylvester & Hippety Hopper
A short cat, who is too slow anymore to capture mice, trains Sylvester to be a mouser to get him food. While catching mice, he lets out "giant mouse" Hippety Hopper.
879	4	The Mouse on 57th Street	MM	Chuck Jones	Michael Maltese	Ken Harris, Richard Thompson & Bob Bransford	N/A (one-shot cartoon)	February 25, 1961	Blu-Ray: Collector's Choice: Vol. 3
A mouse, trying to relieve a headache, mistakes a diamond for ice.
880	5	Strangled Eggs	MM	Robert McKimson	Tedd Pierce	George Grandpré, Ted Bonnicksen, Warren Batchelder & Tom Ray	Foghorn Leghorn; Henery Hawk; Miss Prissy	March 18, 1961	DVD: Super Stars' Foghorn Leghorn & Friends
Similar to Little Boy Boo, but with Miss Prissy adopting Henery Hawk instead of having her own son, Egghead Jr..
881	6	Birds of a Father	LT	Robert McKimson	David Detiege	Warren Batchelder, George Grandpré & Ted Bonnicksen	Sylvester; Sylvester Jr.	April 1, 1961	DVD: Super Stars' Sylvester & Hippety Hopper
Sylvester takes his son Sylvester Jr. bird hunting.
882	7	D' Fightin' Ones	MM	Friz Freleng	N/A	Gerry Chiniquy, Arthur Davis & Virgil Ross	Sylvester; Hector the Bulldog	April 22, 1961	Blu-Ray: Collector's Choice: Vol. 4
In a parody of the 1958 film The Defiant Ones, Sylvester and a dog escape a pound truck, but are stuck in handcuffs as they wander the country.
883	8	The Abominable Snow Rabbit	LT	Chuck Jones; Co-Director: Maurice Noble	Tedd Pierce	Ken Harris, Richard Thompson, Bob Bransford & Tom Ray	Bugs Bunny; Daffy Duck; Hugo the Abominable Snowman	May 20, 1961	DVD: Golden Collection: Vol. 5
Bugs Bunny and Daffy Duck make a wrong turn to Palm Springs, California and end up in the Himalayas, where they encounter Hugo the Abominable Snowman, who wants a bunny rabbit to love and hug.
884	9	Lickety-Splat	LT	Chuck Jones; Co-Director: Abe Levitow	Chuck Jones	Richard Thompson, Bob Bransford, Tom Ray & Ken Harris	Wile E. Coyote and the Road Runner	June 3, 1961	Blu-Ray: Collector's Choice: Vol. 2
Wile E. Coyote is still in pursuit of the Road Runner, but during most of his schemes, he is plagued by needle-nosed dart bombs.
885	10	A Scent of the Matterhorn	LT	Chuck Jones	Chuck Jones	Tom Ray, Ken Harris, Richard Thompson & Bob Bransford; Harry Love (effects)	Pepé Le Pew; Penelope Pussycat	June 24, 1961	DVD: Super Stars' Pepé Le Pew
Pepé Le Pew chases Penelope (who has a stripe placed on her back from a road painter rolling off course) through the Matterhorn. Note: Screen credits appear as French corruptions of actual names.
886	11	The Rebel Without Claws	LT	Friz Freleng	Friz Freleng	Virgil Ross, Arthur Davis & Gerry Chiniquy	Tweety; Sylvester	July 15, 1961	Blu-Ray: Collector's Choice: Vol. 2
During the American Civil War, the Confederates send out Tweety (their last remaining bird) to get a message to General Robert E. Lee. The Union soldiers counter with Sylvester.
887	12	Compressed Hare	MM	Chuck Jones; Co-Director: Maurice Noble	David Detiege	Ken Harris, Richard Thompson, Bob Bransford & Tom Ray	Bugs Bunny; Wile E. Coyote	July 29, 1961	Blu-Ray: Bugs Bunny 80th Anniversary Collection
After Bugs Bunny escapes becoming Wile E. Coyote's lunch, the hungry coyote keeps trying to trap him inside his hole to eat him.
888	13	The Pied Piper of Guadalupe	LT	Friz Freleng; Co-Director: Hawley Pratt	John Dunn	Gerry Chiniquy, Virgil Ross & Bob Matz	Speedy Gonzales; Sylvester	August 19, 1961	DVD: Golden Collection: Vol. 4 Blu-Ray/DVD: Platinum Collection: Vol. 3
Pulling a page out of the Pied Piper of Hamelin story, Sylvester uses a flute to lure Speedy Gonzales' friends with his music to trap and eat them. Speedy, the only mouse immune to the music, must save his friends from Sylvester. Note: Nominated for the Academy Award for Best Animated Short Film in 1962.
889	14	Prince Violent	LT	Friz Freleng; Co-Director: Hawley Pratt	David Detiege	Gerry Chiniquy, Virgil Ross, Arthur Davis & Bob Matz	Bugs Bunny; Yosemite Sam	September 2, 1961	Blu-Ray: Bugs Bunny 80th Anniversary Collection
Viking Sam the Terrible tries to get inside a castle with the aid of his elephant, but Bugs Bunny keeps stopping him. Note: Retitled Prince Varmint for television distribution until the 2020s.
890	15	Daffy's Inn Trouble	LT	Robert McKimson	David Detiege	Ted Bonnicksen, Warren Batchelder & George Grandpré	Daffy Duck; Porky Pig	September 23, 1961	DVD: Super Stars' Daffy Duck (cropped to 16:9 widescreen)
Daffy Duck opens a rival inn after feeling unappreciated by his former boss Porky Pig.
891	16	What's My Lion?	LT	Robert McKimson	David Detiege	Keith Darling, George Grandpré, Ted Bonnicksen & Warren Batchelder	Elmer Fudd	October 21, 1961	N/A
A mountain lion hides out in the home of Elmer Fudd.
892	17	Beep Prepared	MM	Chuck Jones; Co-Director: Maurice Noble	John Dunn & Chuck Jones	Bob Bransford, Tom Ray, Ken Harris & Richard Thompson	Wile E. Coyote and the Road Runner	November 11, 1961	Blu-Ray/DVD: Platinum Collection: Vol. 3
No amount of setbacks will stop Wile E. Coyote from stopping his capture of the Road Runner. Note: Nominated for the Academy Award for Best Animated Short Film in 1962.
893	18	The Last Hungry Cat	MM	Friz Freleng; Co-Director: Hawley Pratt	John Dunn & David Detiege	Gerry Chiniquy, Virgil Ross, Bob Matz, Art Leonardi & Lee Halpern	Tweety; Sylvester; Granny	December 2, 1961	DVD: Golden Collection: Vol. 3 DVD: Super Stars' Tweety & Sylvester; Blu-Ray: Collector's Vault: Vol. 2
Sylvester, thinking he's eaten Tweety, feels immense guilt over what's he done.
894	19	Nelly's Folly	MM	Chuck Jones; Co-Directors: Maurice Noble & Abe Levitow	David Detiege & Chuck Jones	Richard Thompson, Ben Washam, Tom Ray & Ken Harris	N/A (one-shot cartoon)	December 30, 1961	DVD: Warner Bros. Home Entertainment Academy Awards Animation Collection; Blu-Ray/DVD: Platinum Collection: Vol. 3
A giraffe named Nelly leaves the jungle to become a singer in the big city. Note: Nominated for the Academy Award for Best Animated Short Film in 1962.

== 1962 ==
Milt Franklyn, a musical composer who had been with the studio since 1947 and succeeded Carl W. Stalling, dies from a heart attack in April of this year. William Lava permanently takes over as music composer following Mother Was a Rooster.

Chuck Jones is fired after breaching contact by working on Gay Purr-ee at UPA. Friz Freleng leaves Warner Bros. in November 1962.

No. overall	No. in year	Title	Series	Directed by	Story by	Animated by	Recurring characters	Original release date	Official DVD/Blu-Ray Availability
895	1	Wet Hare	LT	Robert McKimson	David Detiege	Warren Batchelder, Ted Bonnicksen, Keith Darling & George Grandpré	Bugs Bunny; Blacque Jacque Shellacque	January 20, 1962	Blu-Ray: Collector's Choice: Vol. 3
Blacque Jacque Shellacque builds a series of dams in an effort to control the water supply, but Bugs Bunny keeps destroying them.
896	2	A Sheep in the Deep	MM	Chuck Jones; Co-Director: Maurice Noble	Chuck Jones	Tom Ray, Ken Harris, Richard Thompson & Bob Bransford	Ralph Wolf and Sam Sheepdog	February 10, 1962	Blu-Ray: Collector's Vault: Vol. 2
No amount of setbacks will stop Ralph Wolf from trying to steal sheep that Sam Sheepdog is guarding.
897	3	Fish and Slips	LT	Robert McKimson	David Detiege	Warren Batchelder, George Grandpré & Ted Bonnicksen	Sylvester; Sylvester Jr.	March 10, 1962	DVD: Super Stars' Sylvester & Hippety Hopper
Sylvester tries to eat fish at an aquarium, but his son Sylvester Jr. keeps getting distracted.
898	4	Quackodile Tears	MM	Arthur Davis	John Dunn & Carl Kolher	Gerry Chiniquy, Virgil Ross, Bob Matz, Lee Halpern & Art Leonardi	Daffy Duck	March 31, 1962	Blu-Ray: Collector's Vault: Vol. 1
Daffy Duck must protect him and his wife's egg from a hungry crocodile.
899	5	Crows' Feat	MM	Friz Freleng; Co-Director: Hawley Pratt	John Dunn	Gerry Chiniquy, Virgil Ross, Bob Matz, Lee Halpern & Art Leonardi	Elmer Fudd; Jose and Manuel	April 21, 1962	DVD: Super Stars' Foghorn Leghorn & Friends
Jose and Manuel try to eat in a cornfield, but Elmer Fudd is two steps ahead.
900	6	Mexican Boarders	LT	Friz Freleng; Co-Director: Hawley Pratt	John Dunn	Gerry Chiniquy, Virgil Ross, Bob Matz, Lee Halpern & Art Leonardi	Speedy Gonzales; Sylvester; Slowpoke Rodriguez	May 12, 1962	DVD: Golden Collection: Vol. 4 Blu-Ray: Collector's Vault: Vol. 2
Speedy Gonzales tries to get food for his cousin Slowpoke Rodriguez while avoiding Sylvester.
901	7	Bill of Hare	MM	Robert McKimson	John Dunn	Keith Darling, Ted Bonnicksen, Warren Batchelder & George Grandpré	Bugs Bunny; Tasmanian Devil	June 9, 1962	Blu-Ray/DVD: Platinum Collection: Vol. 1
The Tasmanian Devil once again tries to eat Bugs Bunny.
902	8	Zoom at the Top	MM	Chuck Jones; Co-Director: Maurice Noble	Chuck Jones	Ken Harris, Richard Thompson, Bob Bransford & Tom Ray	Wile E. Coyote and the Road Runner	June 30, 1962	Blu-Ray: Collector's Vault: Vol. 2
There are no setbacks that will stop Wile E. Coyote from trying to catch the Road Runner.
903	9	The Slick Chick	LT	Robert McKimson	Tedd Pierce	Ted Bonnicksen, Warren Batchelder, George Grandpré & Keith Darling	Foghorn Leghorn	July 21, 1962	N/A
Foghorn Leghorn agrees to babysit a hen's son while she goes out to a hen party...a decision he very quickly regrets.
904	10	Louvre Come Back to Me!	LT	Chuck Jones; Co-Director: Maurice Noble	John Dunn	Richard Thompson, Bob Bransford, Tom Ray & Ken Harris	Pepé Le Pew; Penelope Pussycat	August 18, 1962	DVD: Super Stars' Pepé Le Pew
Pepé Le Pew chases Felice (whose stink from Pepé results in her flying through the air and getting a white stripe down her back from a freshly painted pole) through the Louvre. While Felice tries to get away, her boyfriend Pierre tries to stop Pepé from romantically pursuing his girlfriend.
905	11	Honey's Money	MM	Friz Freleng	John Dunn	Gerry Chiniquy, Virgil Ross, Bob Matz, Lee Halpern & Art Leonardi	Yosemite Sam	September 1, 1962	Blu-Ray/DVD: Platinum Collection: Vol. 3
Similar to His Bitter Half, but with Yosemite Sam instead of Daffy Duck, and the son being much bigger and nicer.
906	12	The Jet Cage	LT	Friz Freleng	Friz Freleng	Gerry Chiniquy, Virgil Ross, Bob Matz, Lee Halpern & Art Leonardi	Tweety; Sylvester; Granny	September 22, 1962	N/A
Tweety flies around in a jet-propelled bird cage, all the while Sylvester trying to get him.
907	13	Mother Was a Rooster	MM	Robert McKimson	David Detiege	George Grandpré, Keith Darling, Ted Bonnicksen & Warren Batchelder	Foghorn Leghorn; Barnyard Dawg	October 20, 1962	Blu-Ray: Collector's Vault: Vol. 2
Barnyard Dawg steals an ostrich egg from the zoo and puts it under Foghorn Leghorn, who thinks the hatched ostrich is his child, raising him like a mother would raise her own chicken.
908	14	Good Noose	LT	Robert McKimson	David Detiege	Warren Batchelder, George Grandpré, Keith Darling & Ted Bonnicksen; Harry Love (effects)	Daffy Duck	November 10, 1962	N/A
Daffy Duck sneaks onboard a ship, only to be caught by the captain and his parrot.
909	15	Shishkabugs	LT	Friz Freleng	John Dunn	Gerry Chiniquy, Virgil Ross, Bob Matz, Lee Halpern & Art Leonardi	Bugs Bunny; Yosemite Sam	December 8, 1962	Blu-Ray: Bugs Bunny 80th Anniversary Collection
Royal chef Yosemite Sam is tasked with preparing hasenpfeffer for a king modeled after Charles Laughton, but Bugs Bunny keeps stopping him.
910	16	Martian Through Georgia	LT	Chuck Jones & Abe Levitow; Co-Director: Maurice Noble	Carl Kolher & Chuck Jones	Tom Ray, Ken Harris, Richard Thompson & Bob Bransford	N/A (one-shot cartoon)	December 29, 1962	DVD: Golden Collection: Vol. 6
A bored Martian wanders around Earth, scaring (albeit unintentionally) the populace.

== 1963 ==
Warner Bros. Cartoons shuts down this year.

No. overall	No. in year	Title	Series	Directed by	Story by	Animated by	Recurring characters	Original release date	Official DVD/Blu-Ray Availability
911	1	I Was a Teenage Thumb	MM	Chuck Jones; Co-Director: Maurice Noble	John Dunn & Chuck Jones	Bob Bransford, Tom Ray, Ken Harris & Richard Thompson	N/A (one-shot cartoon)	January 19, 1963	Blu-Ray: Collector's Vault: Vol. 2
George Ebenezer Thumb and his wife Prunhilda are granted a thumb-sized son by the constantly-transforming wizard Ralph K. Merlin Jr.
912	2	Devil's Feud Cake	MM	Friz Freleng	Friz Freleng & Warren Foster	Gerry Chiniquy, Virgil Ross, Bob Matz, Art Leonardi & Lee Halpern	Bugs Bunny; Yosemite Sam	February 9, 1963	Blu-Ray: Collector's Choice: Vol. 4
Yosemite Sam is sent to Hell and is given more chances by the Devil to return and capture Bugs Bunny in this clip show cartoon, with his chances all being older cartoons with new music cues.
913	3	Fast Buck Duck	MM	Robert McKimson; Co-Director: Ted Bonnicksen	John Dunn	Warren Batchelder, Ted Bonnicksen, Keith Darling & George Grandpré; Harry Love (effects)	Daffy Duck; Hector the Bulldog	March 9, 1963	N/A
Daffy Duck applies to be a local entertainer for a millionaire. However, Percy the Bulldog proves an obstacle to Daffy's gaining entry to the millionaire's room.
914	4	The Million Hare	LT	Robert McKimson	David Detiege	Ted Bonnicksen, Warren Batchelder, George Grandpré & Keith Darling	Bugs Bunny; Daffy Duck	April 6, 1963	DVD: Super Stars' Bugs Bunny (cropped to 16:9 widescreen); Blu-Ray: Bugs Bunny 80th Anniversary Collection (original 4:3 aspect ratio)
Bugs Bunny and Daffy Duck compete in a race for one million dollars.
915	5	Mexican Cat Dance	LT	Friz Freleng	John Dunn	Gerry Chiniquy, Virgil Ross, Bob Matz, Art Leonardi & Lee Halpern	Speedy Gonzales; Sylvester	April 20, 1963	N/A
Speedy Gonzales plays a bullfighter, with Sylvester as the bull.
916	6	Now Hear This	LT	Chuck Jones; Co-Director: Maurice Noble	John Dunn & Chuck Jones	Ben Washam & Bob Bransford	N/A (one-shot cartoon)	April 27, 1963	DVD: Golden Collection: Vol. 6 DVD: Warner Bros. Home Entertainment Academy Awards Animation Collection
An old British man mistakes one of the horns of the Devil for his hearing trumpet, and hears many interesting sounds. Note: Nominated for the Academy Award for Best Animated Short Film in 1963.
917	7	Woolen Under Where	MM	Phil Monroe & Richard Thompson	Chuck Jones	Richard Thompson, Bob Bransford, Tom Ray & Ken Harris	Ralph Wolf and Sam Sheepdog	May 11, 1963	Blu-Ray: Collector's Vault: Vol. 2
There are no setbacks that will stop Sam Sheepdog from stopping Ralph Wolf's capture of sheep.
918	8	Hare-Breadth Hurry	LT	Chuck Jones; Co-Director: Maurice Noble	John Dunn	Tom Ray, Ken Harris, Richard Thompson & Bob Bransford; Harry Love (effects)	Bugs Bunny; Wile E. Coyote	June 8, 1963	Blu-Ray: Collector's Choice: Vol. 2
Bugs Bunny fills in for the Road Runner for a day, where he has to avoid capture by Wile E. Coyote (who, unlike in previous Bugs/Wile E. cartoons, doesn't talk) in the usual desert landscape.
919	9	Banty Raids	MM	Robert McKimson	Robert McKimson & Nick Bennion	George Grandpré, Keith Darling, Ted Bonnicksen & Warren Batchelder	Foghorn Leghorn; Barnyard Dawg	June 29, 1963	DVD: Super Stars' Foghorn Leghorn & Friends; Blu-Ray: Collector's Vault: Vol. 1
A small beatnik rooster disguises himself as a baby to score with the hens...and to keep off Foghorn Leghorn's radar.
920	10	Chili Weather	MM	Friz Freleng	John Dunn	Gerry Chiniquy, Virgil Ross, Bob Matz, Lee Halpern & Art Leonardi	Speedy Gonzales; Sylvester	August 17, 1963	DVD: Golden Collection: Vol. 4
Speedy Gonzales tries to get food for his starving friends in a food processing plant guarded by Sylvester.
921	11	The Unmentionables	MM	Friz Freleng	John Dunn	Gerry Chiniquy, Virgil Ross, Bob Matz, Art Leonardi & Lee Halpern	Bugs Bunny; Rocky and Mugsy	September 7, 1963	Blu-Ray: Bugs Bunny 80th Anniversary Collection
Bugs Bunny, disguised as Agent Elegant Mess, encounters Rocky and Mugsy while trying to penetrate the criminal underworld of Chicago.
922	12	Aqua Duck	MM	Robert McKimson	John Dunn	Keith Darling, Ted Bonnicksen, Warren Batchelder & George Grandpré	Daffy Duck	September 28, 1963	N/A
Daffy Duck is in the desert and very dehydrated, refusing to give up a gold nugget he finds to a mouse in exchange for water.
923	13	Mad as a Mars Hare	MM	Chuck Jones; Co-Director: Maurice Noble	John Dunn	Ken Harris, Richard Thompson, Bob Bransford & Tom Ray; Harry Love (effects)	Bugs Bunny; Marvin the Martian	October 19, 1963	DVD: Super Stars' Bugs Bunny (cropped to 16:9 widescreen); Blu-Ray/DVD: Platinum Collection: Vol. 1 (original 4:3 aspect ratio)
Expendable astro-rabbit Bugs Bunny is unwittingly sent to Mars and evades Marvin the Martian's attempts to get rid of him.
924	14	Claws in the Lease	MM	Robert McKimson	John Dunn	Warren Batchelder, George Grandpré & Ted Bonnicksen	Sylvester; Sylvester Jr.	November 9, 1963	DVD: Super Stars' Sylvester & Hippety Hopper
Sylvester and Sylvester Jr. try to get adopted. They find a woman who adopts Jr., but only Jr., so Sylvester needs to sneak inside.
925	15	Transylvania 6-5000	MM	Chuck Jones; Co-Director: Maurice Noble	John Dunn	Bob Bransford, Tom Ray, Ken Harris & Richard Thompson	Bugs Bunny	November 30, 1963	DVD: Golden Collection: Vol. 5
Bugs Bunny stays in a castle one night, where he goes up against a vampire.
926	16	To Beep or Not to Beep	MM	Chuck Jones; Co-Director: Maurice Noble	John Dunn & Chuck Jones	Richard Thompson, Bob Bransford, Tom Ray & Ken Harris	Wile E. Coyote and the Road Runner	December 28, 1963	DVD: Golden Collection: Vol. 3 Blu-Ray: Collector's Vault: Vol. 2
A cartoon consisting entirely of the original animation from Adventures of the Road Runner, but with new music cues.

== 1964 ==
Production on cartoons is outsourced to DePatie–Freleng Enterprises, beginning with Pancho's Hideaway.

No. overall	No. in year	Title	Series	Directed by	Story by	Animated by	Recurring characters	Original release date	Official DVD/Blu-Ray Availability
927	1	Dumb Patrol	LT	Gerry Chiniquy	John Dunn	Virgil Ross, Bob Matz, Art Leonardi & Lee Halpern	Bugs Bunny; Yosemite Sam; Porky Pig (cameo)	January 18, 1964	Blu-Ray: Collector's Choice: Vol. 3
In World War I-era France in 1917, Bugs Bunny confronts German fighter pilot Baron Sam Von Shpamm.
928	2	A Message to Gracias	LT	Robert McKimson	John Dunn	George Grandpré, Ted Bonnicksen & Warren Batchelder; Harry Love (effects)	Speedy Gonzales; Sylvester; Manuel	February 8, 1964	DVD: Golden Collection: Vol. 4
Speedy Gonzales is a messenger who has to deliver a message between competing mice generals during the Mexican Revolution, and also dodge Sylvester.
929	3	Bartholomew Versus the Wheel	MM	Robert McKimson	John Dunn	George Grandpré, Ted Bonnicksen & Warren Batchelder	N/A (one-shot cartoon)	February 29, 1964	DVD: Golden Collection: Vol. 6 (extra)
A story of a dog who really, really hated wheels, before learning to love them.
930	4	Freudy Cat	LT	Robert McKimson	Tedd Pierce	Ted Bonnicksen, Warren Batchelder & George Grandpré	Hippety Hopper; Sylvester; Sylvester Jr.	March 14, 1964	DVD: Super Stars' Sylvester & Hippety Hopper
In this clip show cartoon, Sylvester talks to a psychiatrist about his encounters with Hippety Hopper.
931	5	Dr. Devil and Mr. Hare	MM	Robert McKimson	John Dunn	George Grandpré, Ted Bonnicksen & Warren Batchelder	Bugs Bunny; Tasmanian Devil	March 28, 1964	DVD: Super Stars' Bugs Bunny (cropped to 16:9 widescreen); Blu-Ray/DVD: Platinum Collection: Vol. 1 (original 4:3 aspect ratio)
Bugs Bunny puts on various doctor-related disguises to avoid being eaten by the Tasmanian Devil.
932	6	Nuts and Volts	LT	Friz Freleng	John Dunn	Gerry Chiniquy, Virgil Ross, Bob Matz, Art Leonardi & Lee Halpern	Speedy Gonzales; Sylvester	April 25, 1964	DVD: Golden Collection: Vol. 4
Sylvester invents a robot to capture Speedy Gonzales.
933	7	The Iceman Ducketh	LT	Phil Monroe; Co-Director: Maurice Noble	John Dunn	Bob Bransford, Tom Ray, Ken Harris, Richard Thompson, Bob Matz & Alex Ignatiev; Harry Love (effects)	Bugs Bunny; Daffy Duck	May 16, 1964	DVD: Super Stars' Daffy Duck (cropped to 16:9 widescreen); Blu-Ray: Dear Heart (extra, original 4:3 aspect ratio)
Daffy Duck tries to hunt Bugs Bunny in the winter to get money for his fur.
934	8	War and Pieces	LT	Chuck Jones; Co-Director: Maurice Noble	John Dunn	Ken Harris, Richard Thompson, Bob Bransford & Tom Ray	Wile E. Coyote and the Road Runner	June 6, 1964	Blu-Ray: Collector's Choice: Vol. 3
Wile E. Coyote once again pursues the Road Runner.
935	9	Hawaiian Aye Aye	MM	Gerry Chiniquy	Tedd Pierce & Bill Danch	Virgil Ross, Bob Matz, Art Leonardi & Lee Halpern	Tweety; Sylvester; Granny	June 27, 1964	Blu-Ray: Dear Heart (extra, restored)
In Hawaii, Sylvester tries to eat Tweety while Granny is at a luau, but he has to deal with Granny's shark Sharky to get to him.
936	10	False Hare	LT	Robert McKimson	John Dunn	Warren Batchelder, George Grandpré & Ted Bonnicksen	Bugs Bunny; Foghorn Leghorn (cameo)	July 16, 1964	DVD: Super Stars' Bugs Bunny (cropped to 16:9 aspect ratio); Blu-Ray: Bugs Bunny 80th Anniversary Collection (original 4:3 aspect ratio)
A wolf disguises himself as a bunny to trick Bugs Bunny into joining a "rabbit's club", Club Del Conejo, to eat him. Bugs sees through the disguise, but decides to play along. Note: Final cartoon (in production order) by Warner Bros. Cartoons.
937	11	Señorella and the Glass Huarache	LT	Hawley Pratt	John Dunn	Gerry Chiniquy, Bob Matz, Virgil Ross & Lee Halpern	N/A (one-shot cartoon)	August 1, 1964	DVD: Golden Collection: Vol. 5
A Spanish retelling of the Cinderella folk tale. Note: Final cartoon produced by Warner Bros. Cartoons.
938	12	Pancho's Hideaway	LT	Friz Freleng; Co-Director: Hawley Pratt	John Dunn	Bob Matz, Norman McCabe & Don Williams	Speedy Gonzales	October 24, 1964	DVD: Golden Collection: Vol. 4
Speedy Gonzales tries to track down and stop a Mexican Yosemite Sam-like bandit named Pancho Vanilla.
939	13	Road to Andalay	MM	Friz Freleng; Co-Director: Hawley Pratt	John Dunn	Norman McCabe, Don Williams, Bob Matz	Speedy Gonzales; Sylvester	December 26, 1964	Blu-Ray: Collector's Choice: Vol. 4
Sylvester buys a hawk to capture Speedy Gonzales, but the hawk is not cooperative.

== 1965 ==
No. overall (Note: Shorts without an episode number within the year constitute cutdowns from Adventures of the Road Runner (1962).)	No. in year	Title	Series	Directed by	Story by	Animated by	Recurring characters	Original release date	Official DVD/Blu-Ray Availability
–	–	Zip Zip Hooray!	LT	N/A	John Dunn	Ken Harris, Richard Thompson, Ben Washam, Tom Ray & Bob Bransford	Ralph Phillips; Wile E. Coyote and the Road Runner	January 1, 1965	DVD: Golden Collection: Vol. 2 (extra, unrestored)
A cartoon consisting entirely of the original footage from Adventures of the Road Runner.
940	1	It's Nice to Have a Mouse Around the House	LT	Friz Freleng; Co-Director: Hawley Pratt	John Dunn	Don Williams, Bob Matz & Norman McCabe	Daffy Duck; Speedy Gonzales; Sylvester; Granny	January 16, 1965	Blu-Ray/DVD: Mouse Chronicles (extra, unrestored)
Granny hires Daffy Duck to capture Speedy Gonzales.
941	2	Cats and Bruises	MM	Friz Freleng; Co-Director: Hawley Pratt	John Dunn	Bob Matz, Norman McCabe, Don Williams, Manuel Perez, Warren Batchelder & Lee Halpern	Speedy Gonzales; Sylvester; Hector the Bulldog	January 30, 1965	N/A
A clip show in which Sylvester tries to catch Speedy Gonzales across various old cartoon clips.
–	–	Road Runner a Go-Go	MM	N/A	John Dunn	Ken Harris, Richard Thompson, Ben Washam, Tom Ray & Bob Bransford	Wile E. Coyote and the Road Runner	February 1, 1965	DVD: Golden Collection: Vol. 2 (extra, unrestored)
Another cartoon consisting entirely of the original footage from Adventures of the Road Runner.
942	3	The Wild Chase	MM	Friz Freleng; Co-Director: Hawley Pratt	N/A	Norman McCabe, Don Williams, Manuel Perez, Warren Batchelder & Laverne Harding	Speedy Gonzales; Sylvester; Wile E. Coyote and the Road Runner	February 27, 1965	DVD: Golden Collection: Vol. 4
A race between Speedy Gonzales and the Road Runner is underway, but their rivals (Sylvester and Wile E. Coyote respectively) together try to capture them.
943	4	Moby Duck	LT	Robert McKimson	N/A	Don Williams, Manuel Perez, Warren Batchelder, Bob Matz & Laverne Harding	Daffy Duck; Speedy Gonzales	March 27, 1965	N/A
Similar to Canned Feud, but with Daffy Duck and Speedy Gonzales, and on a desert island.
944	5	Assault and Peppered	MM	Robert McKimson	John Dunn	Manuel Perez, Warren Batchelder, Bob Matz, Laverne Harding, Norman McCabe & Don Williams	Daffy Duck; Speedy Gonzales	April 24, 1965	N/A
Similar to Bunker Hill Bunny, but with Daffy Duck and Speedy Gonzales instead of Bugs Bunny and Yosemite Sam, and in Mexico.
945	6	Well Worn Daffy	LT	Robert McKimson	David Detiege	Warren Batchelder, Bob Matz, Laverne Harding, Norman McCabe, Don Williams & Manuel Perez	Daffy Duck; Speedy Gonzales; Jose	May 22, 1965	Blu-Ray: Brainstorm (extra, restored)
Daffy Duck tries to stop Speedy Gonzales and his friends from getting water from his well.
946	7	Suppressed Duck	LT	Robert McKimson	David Detiege	Bob Matz, Manuel Perez & Warren Batchelder	Daffy Duck	June 18, 1965	DVD: Super Stars' Daffy Duck (cropped to 16:9 widescreen)
Daffy Duck goes on a bear hunt, but the bears are protected by park rangers behind a boundary line.
947	8	Corn on the Cop	MM	Irv Spector	Friz Freleng	Manuel Perez, Warren Batchelder & Bob Matz	Daffy Duck; Porky Pig; Granny	July 24, 1965	DVD: Super Stars' Porky & Friends
On Halloween, Daffy Duck and Porky Pig are cops who are hunting a criminal who looks a lot like Granny...with Granny herself thinking Daffy and Porky are just annoying trick-or-treaters when they try to apprehend her.
948	9	Rushing Roulette	MM	Robert McKimson	David Detiege	Bob Matz, Manuel Perez, Warren Batchelder, Norman McCabe & Don Williams	Wile E. Coyote and the Road Runner	July 31, 1965	N/A
Wile E. Coyote tries to use dangerous and explosive traps to get the Road Runner.
949	10	Run, Run, Sweet Road Runner	MM	Rudy Larriva	Rudy Larriva	Hank Smith & Tom McDonald	Wile E. Coyote and the Road Runner	August 21, 1965	N/A
Wile E. Coyote creates a female Road Runner decoy.
950	11	Tease for Two	LT	Robert McKimson	David Detiege	Warren Batchelder, Bob Matz & Manuel Perez	Daffy Duck; Goofy Gophers	August 28, 1965	N/A
Daffy Duck tries to hunt for gold in the mountains...which just so happen to be at the home of the Goofy Gophers, who retaliate in return for the disturbance.
951	12	Tired and Feathered	LT	Rudy Larriva	Rudy Larriva	Hank Smith, Virgil Ross & Bob Bransford	Wile E. Coyote and the Road Runner	September 18, 1965	N/A
Wile E. Coyote continues to fall in his own traps while trying to capture the Road Runner.
952	13	Boulder Wham!	MM	Rudy Larriva	Len Janson	Virgil Ross, Bob Bransford & Hank Smith	Wile E. Coyote and the Road Runner	October 9, 1965	DVD: Super Stars' Road Runner and Wile E. Coyote
Wile E. Coyote tries to get over a gorge to catch the Road Runner.
953	14	Chili Corn Corny	LT	Robert McKimson	David Detiege	Manuel Perez, Warren Batchelder & Bob Matz	Daffy Duck; Speedy Gonzales	October 23, 1965	N/A
Speedy Gonzales has to contend with Daffy Duck while trying get something for his old friend Crow to eat.
954	15	Just Plane Beep	MM	Rudy Larriva	Don Jurwich	Bob Bransford, Hank Smith & Virgil Ross	Wile E. Coyote and the Road Runner	October 30, 1965	N/A
Wile E. Coyote tries to use a bi-plane to capture the Road Runner.
955	16	Hairied and Hurried	MM	Rudy Larriva	Nick Bennion	Hank Smith, Virgil Ross, Bob Bransford	Wile E. Coyote and the Road Runner	November 13, 1965	DVD: Super Stars' Road Runner and Wile E. Coyote
Wile E. Coyote tries to use an assortment of Acme gadgets to catch the Road Runner.
956	17	Go Go Amigo	MM	Robert McKimson	David Detiege	Warren Batchelder, Bob Matz & Manuel Perez	Daffy Duck; Speedy Gonzales	November 20, 1965	N/A
Speedy Gonzales needs music for his birthday party, but Daffy Duck denies him the free use of his radios.
957	18	Highway Runnery	LT	Rudy Larriva	Al Bertino	Virgil Ross, Bob Bransford & Hank Smith	Wile E. Coyote and the Road Runner	December 11, 1965	DVD: Super Stars' Road Runner and Wile E. Coyote
Wile E. Coyote attempts to capture the Road Runner on a highway.
958	19	Chaser on the Rocks	MM	Rudy Larriva	Tom Dagenais	Hank Smith, Virgil Ross & Bob Bransford	Wile E. Coyote and the Road Runner	December 25, 1965	DVD: Super Stars' Road Runner and Wile E. Coyote
Wile E. Coyote tries to capture the Road Runner while also dealing with the intense desert heat, which is making him very thirsty and even hallucinate.

== 1966 ==
No. overall	No. in year	Title	Series	Directed by	Story by	Animated by	Recurring characters	Original release date	Official DVD/Blu-Ray Availability
959	1	The Astroduck	LT	Robert McKimson	N/A	Warren Batchelder, George Grandpré, Bob Matz, Norman McCabe, Manuel Perez & Don Williams	Daffy Duck; Speedy Gonzales	January 1, 1966	N/A
Daffy Duck rents a house from a realtor in Mexico, but Speedy Gonzales, claiming that his family has lived there for many generations, will not leave.
960	2	Shot and Bothered	LT	Rudy Larriva	Nick Bennion	Bob Bransford, Hank Smith & Virgil Ross	Wile E. Coyote and the Road Runner	January 8, 1966	DVD: Super Stars' Road Runner and Wile E. Coyote
Wile E. Coyote keeps suffering from falls and explosions while trying to catch the Road Runner.
961	3	Out and Out Rout	MM	Rudy Larriva	Dale Hale	Virgil Ross, Bob Bransford & Hank Smith	Wile E. Coyote and the Road Runner	January 29, 1966	DVD: Super Stars' Road Runner and Wile E. Coyote
Wile E. Coyote tries to use various sets of schemes and objects involving speed to capture the Road Runner.
962	4	Mucho Locos	MM	Robert McKimson	David Detiege	Manuel Perez, George Grandpré & Bob Matz	Daffy Duck; Speedy Gonzales; Jose	February 5, 1966	N/A
Speedy Gonzales talks to his friend about Daffy Duck in this clip show cartoon.
963	5	The Solid Tin Coyote	LT	Rudy Larriva	Don Jurwich	Hank Smith, Virgil Ross & Bob Bransford	Wile E. Coyote and the Road Runner	February 19, 1966	DVD: Super Stars' Road Runner and Wile E. Coyote
Wile E. Coyote invents a coyote robot to capture the Road Runner.
964	6	Mexican Mousepiece	MM	Robert McKimson	David Detiege	George Grandpré, Bob Matz & Manuel Perez	Daffy Duck; Speedy Gonzales	February 26, 1966	N/A
Daffy Duck's house is invaded by mice, including Speedy Gonzales.
965	7	Clippety Clobbered	LT	Rudy Larriva	Tom Dagenais	Bob Bransford, Hank Smith & Virgil Ross	Wile E. Coyote and the Road Runner	March 12, 1966	DVD: Super Stars' Road Runner and Wile E. Coyote
Wile E. Coyote receives a chemistry set and tries to use different chemical solutions to catch the Road Runner.
966	8	Daffy Rents	LT	Robert McKimson	Michael O'Connor	Bob Matz, Manuel Perez, George Grandpré & Norman McCabe	Daffy Duck; Speedy Gonzales	March 26, 1966	N/A
Daffy Duck tries to capture Speedy Gonzales in a hospital.
967	9	A-Haunting We Will Go	LT	Robert McKimson	N/A	Manuel Perez, George Grandpré, Warren Batchelder & Bob Matz	Daffy Duck; Speedy Gonzales; Witch Hazel	April 16, 1966	DVD: Golden Collection: Vol. 4 Blu-Ray/DVD: Platinum Collection: Vol. 1
On Halloween, Daffy Duck tries to persuade his nephew Witch Hazel isn't a real witch. Wanting a break from her work, Witch Hazel turns Speedy Gonzales into a duplicate of her, and Speedy-Hazel tends to Daffy during her absence.
968	10	Snow Excuse	MM	Robert McKimson	David Detiege	George Grandpré, Bob Matz, Manuel Perez, Don Williams & Norman McCabe	Daffy Duck; Speedy Gonzales	May 21, 1966	N/A
Speedy Gonzales tries to steal firewood from Daffy Duck.
969	11	A Squeak in the Deep	LT	Robert McKimson	Sid Marcus	Bob Matz, Manuel Perez, Norman McCabe, George Grandpré, Ted Bonnicksen & Warren Batchelder	Daffy Duck; Speedy Gonzales	July 19, 1966	N/A
Daffy Duck and Speedy Gonzales compete in a boat race.
970	12	Feather Finger	MM	Robert McKimson	Michael O'Connor	Manuel Perez, Norman McCabe, George Grandpré, Ted Bonnicksen, Bob Matz & Don Williams	Daffy Duck; Speedy Gonzales	August 20, 1966	N/A
Daffy Duck is hired in a Wild West-style town to capture Speedy Gonzales for money.
971	13	Swing Ding Amigo	LT	Robert McKimson	Sid Marcus	George Grandpré, Ted Bonnicksen, Bob Matz & Manuel Perez	Daffy Duck; Speedy Gonzales	September 17, 1966	N/A
Daffy Duck is trying to sleep, but Speedy Gonzales and his band keep him awake at night.
972	14	Sugar and Spies	LT	Robert McKimson	Tom Dagenais	Bob Matz, Manuel Perez, Warren Batchelder, Dale Case & Ted Bonnicksen	Wile E. Coyote and the Road Runner	November 5, 1966	DVD: Super Stars' Road Runner and Wile E. Coyote
Wile E. Coyote tries to use spy-themed gadgets to capture the Road Runner.
973	15	A Taste of Catnip	MM	Robert McKimson	Michael O'Connor	Ted Bonnicksen, Bob Matz, Manuel Perez, Norman McCabe, George Grandpré & Warren Batchelder	Daffy Duck; Speedy Gonzales; Sylvester (cameo)	December 3, 1966	N/A
Daffy Duck talks to a psychiatrist about his wanting to eat Speedy Gonzales.

== 1967 ==
This year, Seven Arts Productions, which had just acquired Warner Bros., brings cartoon production in-house, with William L. Hendricks as producer and Alex Lovy as director. Speedy Ghost to Town is the first cartoon under this new studio.

No. overall	No. in year	Title	Series	Directed by	Story by	Animated by	Recurring characters	Original release date	Official DVD/Blu-Ray Availability
974	1	Daffy's Diner	MM	Robert McKimson	Michael O'Connor	Manuel Perez, Warren Batchelder, Ted Bonnicksen, Art Leonardi, Don Williams, Bob Matz & Norman McCabe	Daffy Duck; Speedy Gonzales	January 21, 1967	N/A
Daffy Duck runs a diner, where a hungry cat threatens him to get him a mouse-burger, or else. Daffy sets his sights on Speedy Gonzales.
975	2	Quacker Tracker	LT	Rudy Larriva	Tom Dagenais & Don Jurwich	Virgil Ross, Bob Bransford & Ed Friedman	Daffy Duck; Speedy Gonzales	April 29, 1967	N/A
Daffy Duck tries to catch Speedy Gonzales for the Tooth and Nail Hunting Society.
976	3	The Music Mice-Tro	MM	Rudy Larriva	Tom Dagenais & Cal Howard	Bob Bransford, Ed Friedman & Virgil Ross	Daffy Duck; Speedy Gonzales	May 27, 1967	N/A
While Daffy Duck tries to go on vacation in a hotel, Speedy Gonzales and his band keep stressing him out.
977	4	The Spy Swatter	LT	Rudy Larriva	Tom Dagenais & Cal Howard	Ed Friedman, Virgil Ross & Bob Bransford	Daffy Duck; Speedy Gonzales; Sam Cat	June 24, 1967	N/A
Speedy Gonzales tries to get a secret strength formula for mice to the Mouse Factory, but has to contend with Daffy Duck.
978	5	Speedy Ghost to Town	MM	Alex Lovy	Cal Howard	Volus Jones, Ed Solomon, Ted Bonnicksen & Laverne Harding	Daffy Duck; Speedy Gonzales	July 19, 1967	N/A
Speedy Gonzales and his friend Miguel visit a ghost town in a desert to hunt for "gold".
979	6	Rodent to Stardom	LT	Alex Lovy	Cal Howard	Volus Jones, Laverne Harding, Ted Bonnicksen & Ed Solomon	Daffy Duck; Speedy Gonzales	September 23, 1967	N/A
Daffy Duck works as a stunt double for Speedy Gonzales.
980	7	Go Away Stowaway	MM	Alex Lovy	Cal Howard	Volus Jones, Laverne Harding, Ted Bonnicksen & Ed Solomon	Daffy Duck; Speedy Gonzales	September 30, 1967	N/A
Daffy Duck, tired of Speedy Gonzales' singing and antics, decides to take a vacation, not knowing Speedy is going with him.
981	8	Cool Cat	LT	Alex Lovy	Bob Kurtz	Ted Bonnicksen, Ed Solomon, Volus Jones & Laverne Harding	Cool Cat; Colonel Rimfire	October 14, 1967	N/A
A beatnik tiger named Cool Cat is pursued by a human hunter named Colonel Rimfire.
982	9	Merlin the Magic Mouse	MM	Alex Lovy	Cal Howard	Ted Bonnicksen, Laverne Harding, Volus Jones & Ed Solomon	Merlin the Magic Mouse; Second Banana; Sam Cat	November 18, 1967	Blu-Ray/DVD: Mouse Chronicles (extra, unrestored)
Merlin the Magic Mouse tries to put on a magic show with the help of Second Banana, but Sam Cat, the only audience member, tells Merlin that there will be trouble if the cat finds out that Merlin's a mouse.
983	10	Fiesta Fiasco	LT	Alex Lovy	Cal Howard	Ted Bonnicksen, Laverne Harding, Volus Jones & Ed Solomon	Daffy Duck; Speedy Gonzales	December 9, 1967	N/A
Speedy Gonzales and his friends set up for a party, but Daffy Duck, learning that he was chosen not to be invited, tries to ruin it, not knowing it is his surprise birthday party.

== 1968 ==
No. overall	No. in year	Title	Series	Directed by	Story by	Animated by	Recurring characters	Original release date	Official DVD/Blu-Ray Availability
984	1	Hocus Pocus Pow Wow	LT	Alex Lovy	Cal Howard	Ted Bonnicksen, Laverne Harding, Volus Jones & Ed Solomon	Merlin the Magic Mouse; Second Banana	January 13, 1968	N/A
Merlin the Magic Mouse and Second Banana attempt to head to Powwow City for their next magic show, not knowing there are American Indians in the city, including a dopey Indian named Lo.
985	2	Big Game Haunt	MM	Alex Lovy	Cal Howard	Ted Bonnicksen, Laverne Harding, Volus Jones & Ed Solomon	Cool Cat; Colonel Rimfire	February 10, 1968	N/A
Cool Cat hides in a haunted house owned by a ghost named Spooky.
986	3	Skyscraper Caper	LT	Alex Lovy	Cal Howard	Ted Bonnicksen, Laverne Harding, Volus Jones & Ed Solomon	Daffy Duck; Speedy Gonzales	March 9, 1968	N/A
Speedy Gonzales tries to stop a sleepwalking Daffy Duck from danger.
987	4	Hippydrome Tiger	LT	Alex Lovy	Tony Benedict	Ted Bonnicksen, Laverne Harding, Volus Jones & Ed Solomon	Cool Cat; Colonel Rimfire	March 30, 1968	N/A
Colonel Rimfire and his pink robotic elephant ELA learn that Cool Cat has gone to Paris to participate in a car race at Le Mans.
988	5	Feud with a Dude	MM	Alex Lovy	Cal Howard	Ted Bonnicksen, Laverne Harding, Volus Jones & Ed Solomon	Merlin the Magic Mouse; Second Banana	May 25, 1968	N/A
Merlin the Magic Mouse and Second Banana head to the Ozarks mountain where an attack between the Hatfields and the McCoys are happening.
989	6	See Ya Later Gladiator	LT	Alex Lovy	Cal Howard	Ted Bonnicksen, Laverne Harding, Volus Jones & Ed Solomon	Daffy Duck; Speedy Gonzales	June 29, 1968	N/A
Daffy Duck and Speedy Gonzales time travel back to Roman times.
990	7	3 Ring Wing-Ding	LT	Alex Lovy	Cal Howard	Ted Bonnicksen, Laverne Harding, Volus Jones & Ed Solomon	Cool Cat; Colonel Rimfire	August 24, 1968	N/A
Colonel Rimfire orders Cool Cat to go with him to the circus.
991	8	Flying Circus	LT	Alex Lovy	Cal Howard	Ted Bonnicksen, Laverne Harding, Volus Jones & Ed Solomon	N/A (one-shot cartoon)	September 14, 1968	N/A
A circus is held during World War I.
992	9	Chimp and Zee	MM	Alex Lovy	Don Jurwich	Ted Bonnicksen, Laverne Harding, Volus Jones & Ed Solomon	Colonel Rimfire	October 12, 1968	N/A
Colonel Rimfire meets a boy named Lonzo and a blue-tailed simian in a jungle.
993	10	Bunny and Claude (We Rob Carrot Patches)	LT	Robert McKimson	Cal Howard	Ted Bonnicksen, Laverne Harding, Jim Davis & Ed Solomon	Bunny and Claude	November 9, 1968	DVD: Super Stars' Porky & Friends
Bunny outlaws Bunny and Claude, who rob carrot patches, are chased by the Sheriff as he attempts to disguise himself as a big carrot to catch the duo.

== 1969 ==
All cartoons are directed by Robert McKimson and written by Cal Howard. Warner Bros.–Seven Arts Animation shuts down this year.

No. overall	No. in year	Title	Series	Animated by	Recurring characters	Original release date	Official DVD/Blu-Ray Availability
994	1	The Great Carrot Train Robbery	MM	Ted Bonnicksen, Laverne Harding, Jim Davis & Ed Solomon	Bunny and Claude	January 25, 1969	DVD: Super Stars' Porky & Friends
Bunny and Claude attempt to steal carrots from a train called the Carrot Express.
995	2	Fistic Mystic	LT	Ted Bonnicksen, Laverne Harding, Jim Davis, Norman McCabe & Ed Solomon	Merlin the Magic Mouse; Second Banana	March 29, 1969	N/A
During their next show in the Old West, Merlin the Magic Mouse, with the help of Second Banana, battles a tough guy with boxing gloves from his hat.
996	3	Rabbit Stew and Rabbits Too!	LT	Ted Bonnicksen, Laverne Harding, Jim Davis, Norman McCabe & Ed Solomon	N/A (one-shot cartoon)	June 7, 1969	N/A
Quick Brown Fox attempts to capture Rapid Rabbit to cook rabbit stew, but the rabbit evades the fox.
997	4	Shamrock and Roll	MM	Ted Bonnicksen, Laverne Harding, Jim Davis, Norman McCabe & Ed Solomon	Merlin the Magic Mouse; Second Banana	June 28, 1969	N/A
Merlin the Magic Mouse and Second Banana travel to Ireland for their next magic show, but a chief leprechaun named O'Reilly is displeased with their tricks.
998	5	Bugged by a Bee	LT	Ted Bonnicksen, Laverne Harding, Jim Davis & Ed Solomon	Cool Cat	July 26, 1969	N/A
Cool Cat keeps running into a bee on a college campus, but the bee stinging him earns him awards and accolades.
999	6	Injun Trouble	MM	Ted Bonnicksen, Laverne Harding, Jim Davis & Ed Solomon	Cool Cat	September 20, 1969	N/A
While driving to the town of Hotfoot, Cool Cat somehow takes a wrong turn and ends up in an Indian reservation where he encounters many Native Americans. When he does arrive in Hotfoot, he encounters Gower Gulch at the "Topless Saloon". Note: Final "classic" era Warner Bros. cartoon.
