= Napoleon Bunny-Part =

- Title card
- Directed by: Friz Freleng
- Story by: Warren Foster
- Starring: Mel Blanc
- Music by: Carl Stalling
- Animation by: Gerry Chiniquy; Virgil Ross; Art Davis
- Layouts by: Hawley Pratt
- Backgrounds by: Irv Wyner
- Color process: Technicolor
- Production company: Warner Bros. Cartoons
- Distributed by: Warner Bros. Pictures
- Release date: June 16, 1956
- Running time: 7:08
- Language: English

Napoleon Bunny-Part is a 1956 Warner Bros. Merrie Melodies cartoon, directed by Friz Freleng. The shot was released on June 16, 1956, and stars Bugs Bunny. In this film, Bugs Bunny's opponent is Napoleon. Bugs disguises himself as Empress Joséphine. It is a typical use of cross-dressing in Bugs' film appearances.

== Plot ==
Bugs Bunny is traveling underground and "one wrong turn off the Hollywood freeway" sees him wind up in France inside the headquarters of Napoleon Bonaparte - called Headquartiers du Napoleon. Napoleon is planning a military offensive on a map on his desk and, after Bugs slyly inserts himself into the situation, gets into an argument with him over where the artillery should be placed. Eventually, Napoleon is tricked into placing it where Bugs suggested he should. Pleased with his 'decision', the Emperor takes snuff; Bugs also takes some but it causes him to sneeze and, in spite of Napoleon's attempt to protect his models, the sneeze blows them away. The plans are ruined and Napoleon immediately yells for a guard to come and arrest the "spy". Bugs easily outwits the incompetent guard (who is actually "Mugsy", previously seen in Bugs and Thugs) and causes him to stab Napoleon with a bayonet, resulting in the Emperor launching into a string of (comically imitation) French expletives. "I'm waiting," says Napoleon, indicating that Mugsy understands that, as punishment, he must get the 'point' in the same way. He does, and is seen to jump into the air, in obvious pain.

Napoleon sends Mugsy on his way to search for Bugs and returns to the war room. Bugs is again behind the desk, moving models around on the map. "Nappy" grabs a sword and sets about chasing Bugs. Once inside 'Le Grande Ballroom', Napoleon slips on the floor and slides into a wall. He is then made aware that Josephine is in the room (Bugs in disguise). Napoleon asks 'her' to dance and Bugs checks out the juke box and makes a jazzy choice. Bugs bops around to the music, but the gown is not covering his tail. Napoleon sees it and attempts to shoot the rabbit. Bugs gets away and the chase is on.

Bugs slides down the railing of a winding staircase; Napoleon follows suit. At the bottom of the stairs, Mugsy awaits, his bayonet poised to meet Bugs, who jumps off the railing and watches Napoleon slide by and again get stabbed. The poke sends the Emperor back up the staircase, in pain. After Napoleon has strode down the stairs to face Mugsy, the guard fumbles around trying to explain himself. The Emperor grabs the bayonet and Mugsy prepares, resigned to the fact that he is about to again get the 'point'.

Bugs dashes up the stairs; at the top he is greeted by Napoleon with a gun. They descend the stairs as Napoleon says that "it is the guillotine" for Bugs. When he orders the rabbit into the guillotine, Bugs runs off. This chase takes them down the stairs on one side of the platform then up the stairs on the other . Bugs jumps through the structure of the guillotine, the blade of which is still raised. Napoleon follows but the blade falls and slices the back off his uniform and the hair from the back of his head. As Napoleon rips the hood off the executioner, demanding that he turn it in for being inept, the executioner is revealed to be Bugs.

Napoleon rushes to Mugsy and orders the guard to sound the alarm because the rabbit has escaped. Mugsy dutifully fires the cannon, out of which pops Bugs. Napoleon resumes his chase, but comes upon two men in white coats. One says to the other, "Hey Pierre, here's another Napoleon." Pierre replies, "That's the twelfth one today." The emperor screams, "But I am Napoleon!" as the orderlies drag him off to the nearest insane asylum or "maison d'idiot" ("Sur-r-r-e, you are," one of them nods sarcastically). Napoleon promises, "I will have you executed for this!!!"

Bugs then looks at the camera and says, "Imagine that guy thinking he's Napoleon...[quickly donning Napoleon headwear] when I really am!". He produces a flute and marches off playing "La Marseillaise", which morphs into "Yankee Doodle" as he reaches his rabbit hole.

== Home media ==
Napoleon Bunny-Part is available, uncensored and uncut, on the Looney Tunes Super Stars' Bugs Bunny: Hare Extraordinaire DVD. However, it was cropped to widescreen. It is also available on The Best of Bugs Bunny DVD, also cropped to widescreen. In 2020 the cartoon was re-released on the Bugs Bunny 80th Anniversary Collection Blu-Ray set, this time presented in its original 4:3 aspect ratio.

Preceded by Rabbitson Crusoe	Bugs Bunny Cartoons; 1956	Succeeded by Barbary Coast Bunny
