= Hare-Breadth Hurry =

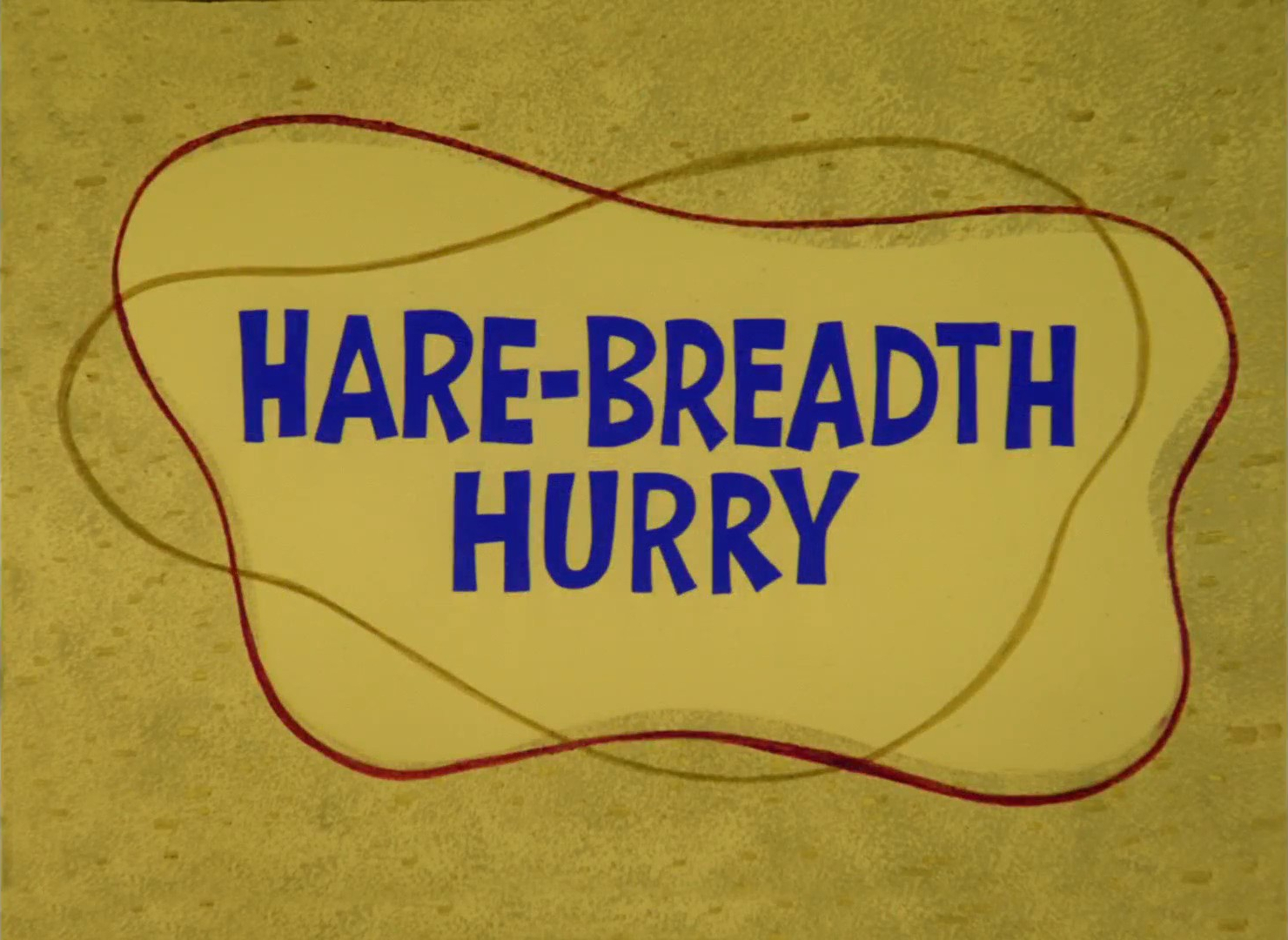
- Title card
- Directed by: Chuck Jones; Maurice Noble (co-director)
- Story by: John Dunn
- Starring: Mel Blanc
- Edited by: Treg Brown
- Music by: Bill Lava
- Animation by: Tom Ray; Ken Harris; Richard Thompson; Bob Bransford; Harry Love (effects animation)
- Backgrounds by: William Butler
- Color process: Technicolor
- Production company: Warner Bros. Cartoons
- Distributed by: Warner Bros. Pictures
- Release date: June 8, 1963
- Running time: 7 minutes
- Language: English

Hare-Breadth Hurry is a 1963 Warner Bros. Looney Tunes cartoon directed by Chuck Jones and Maurice Noble. The cartoon was released on June 8, 1963, and stars Bugs Bunny and Wile E. Coyote in their fifth and final pairing during the Golden Age of American animation. Unlike their four previous outings together, this short follows the formula of Wile E. Coyote's shorts where he co-stars with the Road Runner; as such, Wile E. is silent in this cartoon.

Footage from this cartoon was originally intended to be part of a second episode of the failed compilation TV series Adventures of the Road-Runner. When the pilot for that show was rejected while the second episode was in production, parts of the episode were cut down into this short to salvage the costs on production of the unfinished episode.

== Plot ==
Wile E. Coyote is in pursuit of Bugs Bunny, who temporarily fills in for an injured Road Runner. Utilizing Acme Super Speed Pills to emulate the Road Runner's velocity, Bugs finds himself momentarily matching the speed of his pursuer, only for the pills to abruptly wear off, leaving him vulnerable.

Screenshot from the short

Forced to rely on his cunning, Bugs employs various tactics to outsmart Wile E. Coyote, including a clever ruse involving drawn lines on the road, a makeshift fishing endeavor, and a rigged catapult. Despite Wile E.'s persistent efforts, he repeatedly falls victim to Bugs' inventive stratagems, leading to comical yet predictable outcomes.

As the chase ensues, Bugs orchestrates elaborate traps, capitalizing on Wile E.'s relentless pursuit. Employing ingenious devices and exploiting the coyote's penchant for contraptions, Bugs consistently outmaneuvers his adversary, culminating in a series of calamitous yet humorous mishaps.

== Home media ==
This short is available on the Looney Tunes Collector's Choice: Volume 2 Blu-ray.

== See also ==
- List of American films of 1963

Preceded by The Million Hare	Bugs Bunny Cartoons; 1963	Succeeded by The Unmentionables
