= The Moonlighter =

1953 film by Roy Rowland

- Film poster
- Directed by: Roy Rowland
- Screenplay by: Niven Busch
- Produced by: Joseph Bernhard
- Starring: Barbara Stanwyck; Fred MacMurray; Ward Bond
- Cinematography: Bert Glennon
- Edited by: Terry O. Morse
- Music by: Heinz Roemheld
- Color process: Black and white
- Production companies: Joseph Bernhard Productions; Abtcon Pictures
- Distributed by: Warner Bros. Pictures
- Release date: September 19, 1953
- Running time: 78 minutes
- Country: United States
- Language: English
- Box office: $1 million (US)

The Moonlighter is a 1953 American 3D Western film directed by Roy Rowland and starring Barbara Stanwyck, Fred MacMurray and Ward Bond. Distributed by Warner Bros., it premiered alongside the 1953 Looney Tunes 3-D Bugs Bunny cartoon, Lumber Jack-Rabbit and the 3-D Lippert short, Bandit Island.

== Plot ==
Wes Anderson (MacMurray) has been "moonlighting," rustling cattle at night under the moon. Awaiting trial in jail, a lynch mob led by rancher Alex Prince breaks in and accidentally hangs the wrong man due to a mixup from a cell change during a jail cleaning. Wes escapes.

Rela (Stanwyck), his former sweetheart, after a 5-year absence by Wes, is now involved with his younger brother Tom, who works in a bank. Tom has always admired Wes. Wes seeks vengeance on the lynch party and begins killing some of Prince's hands who lynched the innocent man. Wes is wounded by one of Prince's men and goes back home, where Tom lives with their mother, to recuperate.

Rela tells Wes she's going to marry Tom and asks Wes not to corrupt Tom and ruin their plans. But then Tom is fired from the bank on the same day that Cole Gardner, an outlaw, persuades Wes to rob the bank. Tom decides to join them. Rela warns Wes that if any harm comes to Tom, she will hold him responsible.

During the robbery, Wes and Cole get away with the money, but Tom is shot and killed. A posse is formed and Rela demands to be deputized and help bring back Wes dead or alive. Cole double-crosses his partner, taking the money and leaving Wes tied up. Rela encounters Cole on the trail, outflanking and shooting him. She then finds Wes tied up, taking him prisoner.

On the way back to town, Rela slips in a waterfall and nearly drowns. Wes saves her life. Ashamed of his ways, Wes offers to ride back to town alongside Rela to turn himself in and accept his fate. Wes asks Rela to wait for him and she says she will.

== Cast ==
- Barbara Stanwyck as Rela
- Fred MacMurray as Wes Anderson
- Ward Bond as Cole Gardner
- William Ching as Tom Anderson
- John Dierkes as Sheriff Daws
- Morris Ankrum as Alexander Prince
- Jack Elam as Slim, Strawboss
- Myron Healey as Joe
- Charles Halton as Clemmons Usqubaugh - Undertaker
- Norman Leavitt as Tidy
- Sam Flint as Mr. Mott, Bank President
- Myra Marsh as Mrs. Anderson

== Production ==
The railroad scenes were filmed on the Sierra Railroad in Tuolumne County, California.

== Reception ==
On MysteryFile.com, Jonathan Lewis wrote:

Although the plot may be fairly standard, The Moonlighter is nevertheless an odd film... because of two factors, none of which seem to make much sense. First of all, the film's running time is a mere 78 minutes, yet it has an intermission! Second, it was released in 3-D, but there's really nothing in the movie that makes it remotely worthy of that format.

[NOTE: This was standard for all 3-D films of the era, as both projectors were needed to project 3-D, and the maximum amount of footage that would fit on special reels was 40 minutes.]

The cast also makes it an odd film. Fred MacMurray and Barbara Stanwyck were undoubtedly far too talented for this uneven film. Admittedly, the reunited Double Indemnity (1944) actors do the best they can with the sometimes downright atrocious low-tech dialogue that plagues what could have, with some tweaking, been a much better film. Too much of the dialogue is on the nose, with characters telling each other how much they either love or hate one another. It's just cringeworthy to listen to these two actors who, it's clear, deserved a much better script than the one offered here.
