= Dr. Devil and Mr. Hare =

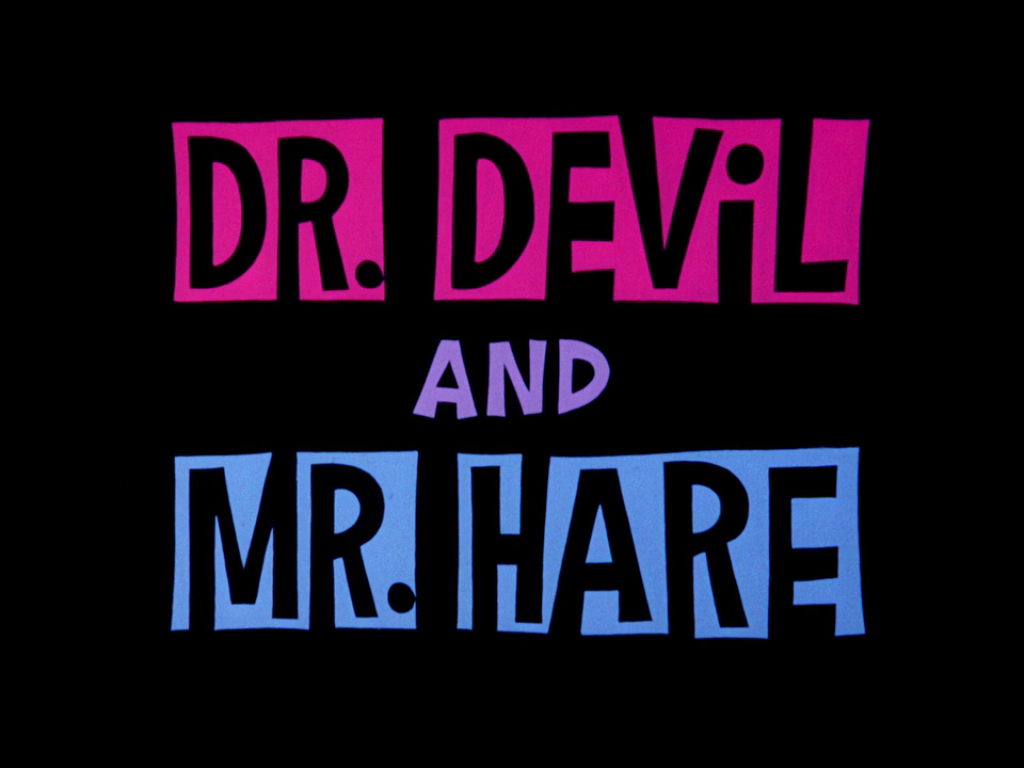
- Title card
- Directed by: Robert McKimson
- Story by: John Dunn
- Starring: Mel Blanc
- Edited by: Treg Brown
- Music by: Bill Lava
- Animation by: Ted Bonnicksen; Warren Batchelder; George Grandpré
- Layouts by: Robert Gribbroek
- Backgrounds by: Robert Gribbroek
- Color process: Technicolor
- Production company: Warner Bros. Cartoons
- Distributed by: Warner Bros. Pictures
- Release date: March 28, 1964
- Running time: 7 minutes
- Country: United States
- Language: English

Dr. Devil and Mr. Hare is a 1964 Warner Bros. Merrie Melodies theatrical cartoon short directed by Robert McKimson. The short was released on March 28, 1964, and stars Bugs Bunny and the Tasmanian Devil.

This marks the final pairing of Bugs and Taz, as well as the final appearance of Taz in the Golden age of American animation. It was Bugs' final cartoon in the Merrie Melodies series. It is also the only cartoon where Bugs and Taz both lose in the end.

== Plot ==
The Tasmanian Devil approaches the jungle. A woodpecker sees this and taps a warning on a tree which we see as a subtitle on the bottom on the screen: "Warning! Tasmanian Devil approaching at 9 o'clock!" Two giraffes hear this and end up running. Two beavers then use their tails to beat out the message on the log that translates as "Take Cover! Devil is Coming! Take Cover! Repeat - Take Cover!". A bear and a moose fighting hear this and end up running as well. A stampede of animals leave the jungle. Bugs is bathing in a nearby pond unaware that Taz has spotted him.

Disliking the taste of Bugs' soap, Taz washes it off and puts ketchup on Bugs. Bugs acts as though he thinks it is blood and freaks out, telling Taz to find a doctor. Taz runs to an infirmary, only to find Bugs dressed as a doctor instead. After a few checkup procedures, Bugs puts spotted glasses on Taz and asks him if he sees spots on his eyes and Taz says he does. Then Bugs gives him nitroglycerine and puts an electric belly firmer vibrating belt on Taz and Taz explodes.

Then Bugs dressed as Sigmund Freud makes Taz lie on a couch and talk about his childhood. Taz talks about how he was a bad boy. Bugs declares closing time and folds Taz and the couch into a suitcase and puts it in a mailbox, which gets picked up by a mail truck. It comes back by a mail truck covered with stickers from all the countries he has been to. Taz searches for Bugs and ends up in a hospital zone. Bugs rolls himself by on a gurney. Inside the hospital. Bugs is a nurse and congratulates Taz and gives Taz a bundle presumably a baby boy. Taz gives Bugs a cigar and unwraps the baby which is actually an exploding bomb. As Bugs walks away, the cigar that Taz gave him turns out to be an exploding cigar.

As Taz spins in, Bugs dressed as a surgeon calls Taz as his assistant. Bugs leaves the room and Taz looks at the patient. It ends up being a robotic Frankenstein's monster which then grabs Taz and beats up Taz offstage. Then in a backfiring moment, the robot heads for Bugs as the monster goes out of control. It ends with Bugs being beaten up by the monster, also off stage, and both the dazed Bugs and Taz staggering back onscreen, bruised and bandaged. Bugs then asks "Is there a doctor in the house? Huh? Is there? Ohh…"

== Home media ==
Dr. Devil and Mr. Hare is available, uncensored and uncut, on the Looney Tunes Super Stars' Bugs Bunny: Hare Extraordinaire DVD. However, it was cropped to widescreen. It is also shown as uncensored, fully screened and uncut, on the Looney Tunes Platinum Collection: Volume 1 Blu-ray box-set.

Preceded by Dumb Patrol	Bugs Bunny Cartoons; 1964	Succeeded by The Iceman Ducketh
