= Dumb Patrol (1931 film) =

1931 film

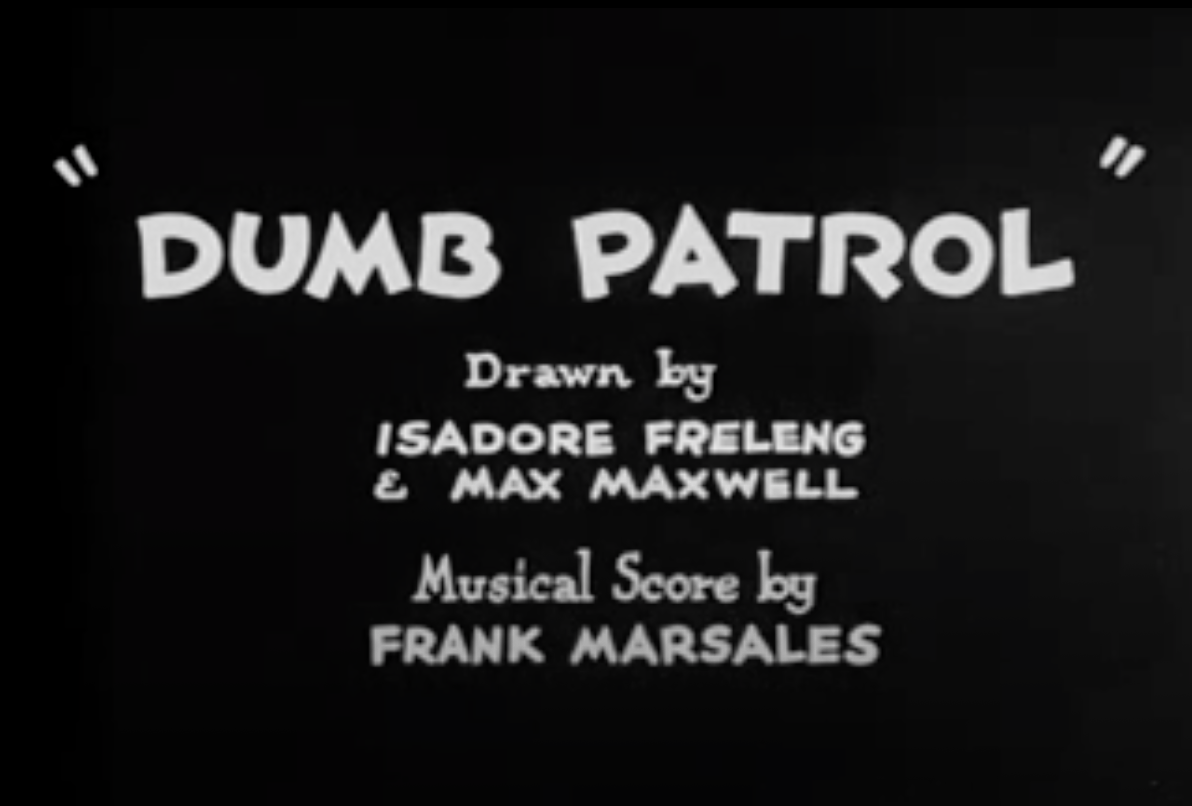
- Title card
- Directed by: Hugh Harman; Rudolf Ising
- Produced by: Hugh Harman; Rudolf Ising
- Starring: Johnny Murray; Rochelle Hudson (both uncredited)
- Music by: Frank Marsales
- Animation by: Isadore Freleng; Max Maxwell
- Color process: Black-and-white
- Production company: Harman-Ising Productions
- Distributed by: Warner Bros. Pictures; The Vitaphone Corporation
- Release date: February 28, 1931; (earliest known date)
- Running time: 7:15
- Country: United States
- Language: English

Dumb Patrol is a 1931 American animated comedy film. It is the ninth film in the Looney Tunes series featuring Bosko. It was released as early as February 28, 1931. (Note: Archived from a March 3 article, this is based on the fact that new cartoon shorts would premiere in theaters on Saturdays.) It is directed by Hugh Harman and Rudolf Ising, while the film score was composed by Frank Marsales.

This cartoon shares its name with Dumb Patrol (1964), a Bugs Bunny and Yosemite Sam Looney Tunes film which was directed by Gerry Chiniquy, a former subordinate of animator Friz Freleng.

== Plot ==
Full short in restored form

Bosko, a pilot in World War I, joyously oils his miniature plane on a battlefield while a conflict occurs. An enemy plane bombs Bosko, angering him. Bosko flies next to the plane and shoots it, shocking the pilot, who immediately bombs the plane and destroys it. Bosko falls into a body suit next to Honey's house. Bosko tries to impress Honey to no avail before starting to play the piano, which impresses Honey and motivates her to dance along. The pilot returns to bomb Bosko twice, destroying the piano and further enraging him. Bosko proceeds to turn a dachshund into a makeshift plane, flying it and shooting fence pieces at the enemy plane. He uses a pipe to redirect enemy bullets, which enrages the pilot enough to bomb him, but the dachshund swallows the bomb in time. Bosko makes the dachshund vomit the bomb, which lands on the plane and turns it into numerous small copies. Bosko sprays water and spits on the miniature planes to cause them to crash, laughing at the pilot's demise.
