= Transylvania 6-5000 (1963 film) =

1963 animated short film by Chuck Jones

- Title card
- Directed by: Chuck Jones; Maurice Noble
- Story by: John Dunn
- Starring: Mel Blanc; Ben Frommer; Julie Bennett
- Edited by: Treg Brown
- Music by: Bill Lava
- Animation by: Bob Bransford; Tom Ray; Ken Harris; Richard Thompson
- Layouts by: Bob Givens
- Backgrounds by: Philip DeGuard
- Color process: Technicolor
- Production company: Warner Bros. Cartoons
- Distributed by: Warner Bros. Pictures
- Release date: November 30, 1963
- Running time: 7:01
- Country: United States
- Language: English

Transylvania 6-5000 is a 1963 Warner Bros. Merrie Melodies animated short directed by Chuck Jones. The short was released on November 30, 1963, and stars Bugs Bunny.

It is a comedy film, depicting a confrontation between Bugs and a vampire in Transylvania.

== Plot ==
Bugs Bunny burrows to Pittsburgh, Pennsylvania but ends up in Transylvania near the castle of Count Bloodcount. He asks directions from the ominous two-headed vulture Agatha and Emily to no avail and tries his luck at the eerie castle.

Although Bugs asks for a phone, the Count insists that he sleep first and escorts him to a bedroom. Unable to sleep, he reads a book on magic words. The Count prepares to strike from behind, but Bugs' recitation from the book turns the vampire into a bat and dunks him in the castle moat. After finishing the book, Bugs strolls through the castle with the Count stalking him, and a battle of magic words ensues. Bugs' increasingly creative spells turn the Count into another two-headed vulture, and he calls Agatha and Emily over. Smitten with the transformed Count, they chase him into the moonlit night.

Having disposed of the vampire, Bugs locates a telephone and tries to reach his travel agency. While waiting for the connection he sings a magic word that turns his ears into bat wings. Bugs hangs up the phone and proceeds to fly home.

== Voice cast ==
- Mel Blanc as Bugs Bunny
- Ben Frommer as Count Bloodcount
- Julie Bennett as Agatha and Emily, the Two-Headed Vulture

== Production notes ==
Transylvania 6-5000 marked Chuck Jones' departure from Warner Bros. Cartoons to found Sib Tower 12 Productions at MGM, making it his last original Warner Bros. cartoon before the move. Released in 1963, it is also the second-to-last Warner cartoon of that year and Jones' tenure with the studio. The title, "Transylvania 6-5000," is a play on the song "Pennsylvania 6-5000," associated with Glenn Miller, referencing the old telephone exchange system where letters represented numbers in phone numbers.

== References in other media ==
Count Bloodcount appears in Looney Tunes Collector: Alert! as a boss character. After the player defeats him, he decides to become an NPC ally of Bugs to find some opportunities in blood.

== See also ==
- List of American films of 1963
- List of Bugs Bunny cartoons

Preceded by Mad as a Mars Hare	Bugs Bunny Cartoons; 1963	Succeeded by Dumb Patrol
