= Lumber Jack-Rabbit =

- Theatrical poster
- Directed by: Charles M. Jones
- Story by: Michael Maltese
- Starring: Mel Blanc; Norman Nesbitt (uncredited)
- Music by: Carl Stalling
- Animation by: Abe Levitow; Ken Harris; Richard Thompson; Lloyd Vaughan; Ben Washam
- Layouts by: Maurice Noble
- Backgrounds by: Philip De Guard
- Color process: Technicolor
- Production company: Warner Bros. Cartoons
- Distributed by: Warner Bros. Pictures; The Vitaphone Corporation
- Release date: September 25, 1953
- Running time: 7 min. (one reel)
- Language: English

Lumber Jack-Rabbit is a 1953 3-D Warner Bros. Looney Tunes cartoon short directed by Chuck Jones and written by Michael Maltese. The cartoon was released on September 25, 1953, and stars Bugs Bunny.

It was notable as the only Warner Bros. Cartoons short to be produced in 3-D; the fad led to the studio's temporary closure, during which the short was released. It premiered with the Warner Bros. 3-D feature The Moonlighter and the 3-D Lippert short, Bandit Island.

== Plot ==
The narrative opens with a contemplative reflection on Paul Bunyan, casting doubt upon his existence while inviting the audience to seek confirmation from an unlikely witness, Bugs Bunny, who once found himself inadvertently traversing the vast terrain of Bunyan's domain.

As Bugs stumbles upon the colossal vegetable garden of Bunyan, mistaking the towering asparagus for peculiar trees and a mammoth carrot for a boulder, his whimsical exploration leads him to believe he has unearthed a "carrot mine," initiating a fervent excavation.

Meanwhile, Paul Bunyan, accompanied by his diminutive canine companion Smidgen, departs on his daily endeavors, leaving the loyal dog to safeguard the garden. Bugs' spirited mining activities draw Smidgen's attention, triggering a chain of comical events as Bugs grapples with the realization of his precarious predicament atop Smidgen's nose.

Undeterred by fear, Bugs devises a resourceful escape plan, utilizing Smidgen's own physiology to outmaneuver the oversized canine. Through a series of clever maneuvers and ingeniously orchestrated distractions, Bugs narrowly evades Smidgen's pursuit, ultimately leading to a climax involving a misidentified redwood tree.

The narrative concludes with Smidgen, ever faithful yet easily misled, bounds toward the towering tree.

== Home media ==
Lumber Jack-Rabbit is available on the Looney Tunes Super Stars' Bugs Bunny: Hare Extraordinaire DVD. However, it was cropped to widescreen. This was later released in its original aspect ratio on the Bugs Bunny 80th Anniversary Collection Blu-ray set.

== 3-Dimensional Gimmick ==
As the short was in 3-D, the WB shield was animated especially to appear as if it zoomed up close to the audience.

The only obvious concession that Lumber Jack-Rabbit made to the 3-D format was at the very beginning of the cartoon, where the zooming "WB" shield overshoots its mark and nearly crashes into the screen, before pulling back to its correct position. This is complemented by a slight variation on "The Merry-Go-Round Broke Down" theme, wherein the opening twanging sound is more exaggerated and reverberant. While this effect can be attributed only to this one short, the shield overshooting its mark has become a common motif in tributes and reboots to the Looney Tunes franchise, including in the opening sequence to the 2011 sitcom The Looney Tunes Show.

The closing sequence is modified as well, with the "That's all Folks!" script fading in rather than being written out.

== See also ==
- Boo Moon

Preceded by Bully for Bugs	Bugs Bunny Cartoons; 1953	Succeeded by Duck! Rabbit, Duck!
