= Mad as a Mars Hare =

- Marvin the Martian threatens to project Bugs Bunny forward into time using his Time-Space Gun
- Directed by: Chuck Jones; Maurice Noble
- Story by: John Dunn
- Starring: Mel Blanc
- Edited by: Treg Brown
- Music by: Bill Lava
- Animation by: Ken Harris; Richard Thompson; Bob Bransford; Tom Ray; Harry Love
- Layouts by: Maurice Noble
- Backgrounds by: Bob Singer
- Color process: Technicolor
- Production company: Warner Bros. Cartoons
- Distributed by: Warner Bros. Pictures; The Vitaphone Corporation
- Release date: October 19, 1963
- Running time: 7 minutes
- Language: English

Mad as a Mars Hare is a 1963 Warner Bros. Merrie Melodies cartoon directed by Chuck Jones and Maurice Noble. The short was released on October 19, 1963, and stars Bugs Bunny and Marvin the Martian. The cartoon's title is a play-on-words of the phrase "mad as a March hare". This is Marvin's final appearance in the Looney Tunes shorts during the Golden Age of American Animation.

== Plot ==
Marvin the Martian observes Earth from Mars through a telescope, witnessing a rocket launch. To his dismay, the rocket careens into his observatory, leaving Marvin shaken but resilient. Subsequently, a lone Bugs Bunny emerges from the rocket, having been unwittingly sent to Mars as an expendable "astro-rabbit." Bugs, upon landing, symbolically claims Mars for Earth with a flag-bearing metal carrot, provoking Marvin's vehement objection to relinquishing his planet.

Marvin's initial attempt to eliminate Bugs with a disintegrating pistol backfires, resulting in his own disintegration and subsequent reintegration. Undeterred, Marvin employs a Time-Space Gun to project Bugs into the future as a subservient laborer. However, a misfire transforms Bugs into a formidable Neanderthal rabbit, who effortlessly overpowers Marvin. Defeated once again, Marvin retreats for regeneration, lamenting his perpetual struggle.

Bugs, unfazed by the ordeal, addresses the audience, musing about surprising Earth's hunters upon his return, before nonchalantly consuming the metal carrot.

== Crew ==
- Co-Director & Layouts: Maurice Noble
- Story: John Dunn
- Animation: Ken Harris, Richard Thompson, Bob Bransford & Tom Ray
- Backgrounds: Bob Singer
- Effects Animation: Harry Love
- Film Editor: Treg Brown
- Voice Characterizations: Mel Blanc
- Music: Bill Lava
- Produced by David H. DePatie
- Directed by Chuck Jones

== Home media ==
Mad as a Mars Hare is available on the Looney Tunes Super Stars' Bugs Bunny: Hare Extraordinaire DVD. However, it was cropped to widescreen. The full-screen version is available on the Looney Tunes Platinum Collection: Volume 1 Blu-ray box set and its DVD edition.

Preceded by The Unmentionables	Bugs Bunny Cartoons; 1963	Succeeded by Transylvania 6-5000
