= Bunny and Claude (We Rob Carrot Patches) =

- Directed by: Robert McKimson
- Story by: Cal Howard
- Produced by: William L. Hendricks
- Starring: Mel Blanc; Pat Woodell; Billy Strange
- Edited by: Hal Geer
- Music by: William Lava
- Animation by: Ted Bonnicksen; Laverne Harding; Jim Davis; Ed Solomon
- Layouts by: Bob Givens; Jaime Diaz
- Backgrounds by: Bob Abrams
- Color process: Technicolor
- Production company: Warner Bros.-Seven Arts Animation
- Distributed by: Warner Bros.-Seven Arts; The Vitaphone Corporation
- Release date: November 9, 1968
- Running time: 6 min
- Language: English

Bunny and Claude (We Rob Carrot Patches) is a 1968 Warner Bros.-Seven Arts Looney Tunes cartoon directed by Robert McKimson. It was the first appearance of Bunny and Claude, inspired by the 1967 Warner Bros. film Bonnie and Clyde. This is the first cartoon since 1964's False Hare directed by Robert McKimson in his own unit. The cartoons he directed in the DePatie–Freleng era were in Friz Freleng's unit.

== Summary ==
Bunny outlaws Bunny and Claude are chased by the Sheriff as he attempts to disguise himself as a big carrot to catch the duo.

== Plot ==
Wanted carrot thieves and lovers Bunny and Claude are introduced through the aptly-titled song, "The Ballad of Bunny and Claude", revealing themselves to rob carrots from anywhere in Oklahoma around U.S. Route 66, be it general stores, carrot patches, even blowing up safes or other buildings to get the carrots stored within, all while being pursued by the local sheriff who intends to catch them, arrest them, and lock them up for the rest of their lives. The duo are also shown to be armed with revolvers and Thompson submachine guns to carry out their crimes.

After robbing the local store of carrots, Bunny and Claude run into the sheriff. However, unaware of their identities at first, the sheriff apologizes for bumping into them and offers to help load their carrots into their car, allowing them to make a clean getaway. When the store owner comes out and reveals to the sheriff that he just let Bunny and Claude escape, he soon is in hot pursuit of them as they continue their rampage. However, they turn around and ram his cruiser, totaling it, before retreating to their flophouse to count their haul. The sheriff soon catches up, but some clever moves and trap doors allow Bunny and Claude to temporarily foil the sheriff and escape to continue their crimes.

After managing to turn a literal roadblock of a giant wooden toy block into smaller ones that spell out "The sheriff is a fink" and Bunny forces the sheriff to carry his cruiser and pursue on foot after blowing out his tires with her Thompson SMG, the sheriff decides to hide in a carrot patch disguised as a giant carrot to ambush and arrest Bunny and Claude that way. When the duo show up to collect the carrots, they pull up the sheriff, and he has them dead to rights as he prepares to cuff them. However, when they comment on his disguise in amazement, he decides to show it off for them, but the moment he turns to show them the backside of it, Claude boots him back into the hole he emerged from and stuns him, allowing them to escape, forcing the sheriff to once more pursue them in his cruiser over the horizon with his siren wailing.
