= Bugs Bunny 80th Anniversary Collection =

2020 American cartoon anthology

- Blu-ray Disc cover
- Directed by: Chuck Jones, Robert McKimson, Bob Clampett, Friz Freleng, Tex Avery, Ken Harris
- Produced by: Leon Schlesinger, Eddie Selzer, John W. Burton, David H. DePatie
- Starring: Mel Blanc, Jeff Bergman, Eric Bauza
- Music by: Carl Stalling, Milt Franklyn, William Lava, George Daugherty
- Distributed by: Warner Bros. Home Entertainment
- Release date: December 1, 2020
- Country: United States
- Language: English

Looney Tunes: Bugs Bunny 80th Anniversary Collection is a Blu-ray Disc box-set released by Warner Bros. Home Entertainment on December 1, 2020. It contains 60 Looney Tunes and Merrie Melodies shorts starring Bugs Bunny and numerous bonus features and supplementary content. The set's packaging includes a slip book, a booklet, and a collectible Bugs Bunny Funko POP! figure.

Initially conceived by Warner Bros. Home Entertainment as a single-disc Blu-ray Disc version of The Essential Bugs Bunny DVD set with an additional Funko! doll, animation historian Jerry Beck convinced the department heads to extend the set to three discs and include cartoons not previously released on DVD or Blu-ray Disc in order to appeal to adult collectors. The set includes 32 newly restored and remastered cartoons that were previously unavailable on the Looney Tunes Golden Collection DVD and Looney Tunes Platinum Collection Blu-ray Disc sets, in addition to 20 "essential" shorts ported over from those previous collections. Eight cartoons (Lumber Jack-Rabbit, This is a Life?, Napoleon Bunny-Part, People Are Bunny, Person to Bunny, From Hare to Heir, The Million Hare and False Hare) had been previously restored and released on the Looney Tunes Super Stars DVDs, however, this Blu-ray Disc set presents them in their original 4:3 aspect ratio (as opposed to the Super Stars sets which had them cropped to "widescreen"). According to Beck, with this collection along with the previous Golden and Platinum Collections, Looney Tunes fans and collectors would be able to own approximately 90% of Bugs Bunny's filmography.

The set also marks the first official home media release of the HBO Max series Looney Tunes Cartoons, with 10 Bugs Bunny centric episodes included as bonus features.

In December 2025, Warner Bros. Home Entertainment reissued this set under the name Bugs Bunny Collection without the Funko doll or elaborate packaging - but the exact same three discs. It was released in March 2026.

== Disc 1 ==
- LT = Looney Tunes
- MM = Merrie Melodies
- (*) = Newly Restored for Blu-ray

#	Title	Co-stars	Release date	Director	Series
1	Elmer's Candid Camera	Elmer	March 2, 1940	Chuck Jones	MM
2	A Wild Hare	Elmer	July 27, 1940	Tex Avery	MM
3	Hold the Lion, Please (*)		June 6, 1942	Chuck Jones	MM
4	Bugs Bunny Gets the Boid	Beaky	July 11, 1942	Bob Clampett	MM
5	Super-Rabbit		April 3, 1943	Chuck Jones	MM
6	Jack-Wabbit and the Beanstalk (*)		June 12, 1943	Friz Freleng	MM
7	What's Cookin' Doc? (*)		January 8, 1944	Bob Clampett	MM
8	Bugs Bunny and the Three Bears	The Three Bears	February 26, 1944	Chuck Jones	MM
9	Hare Ribbin'		June 24, 1944	Bob Clampett	MM
10	The Old Grey Hare	Elmer	October 28, 1944	Bob Clampett	MM
11	Baseball Bugs		February 2, 1946	Friz Freleng	LT
12	Hair-Raising Hare	Gossamer	May 25, 1946	Chuck Jones	MM
13	Racketeer Rabbit (*)		September 14, 1946	Friz Freleng	LT
14	Bugs Bunny Rides Again	Sam	June 12, 1948	Friz Freleng	MM
15	Haredevil Hare	Marvin	July 24, 1948	Chuck Jones	LT
16	Hot Cross Bunny (*)		August 21, 1948	Robert McKimson	MM
17	Hare Splitter (*)		September 25, 1948	Friz Freleng	MM
18	Knights Must Fall (*)		July 16, 1949	Friz Freleng	MM
19	What's Up, Doc?	Elmer	June 17, 1950	Robert McKimson	LT
20	8 Ball Bunny	Playboy	July 8, 1950	Chuck Jones	LT

=== Special Features ===
- NEW: Bugs Bunny's 80th What's Up, Doc-umentary! (provided in HD)
- Behind the Tunes Featurettes
  - Hare Ribbin' Director's Cut (Uncensored & Unrestored)
  - Bugs: A Rabbit for All Seasonings
  - Forever Befuddled
  - Mars Attacks! Life on the Red Planet with My Favorite Martian (provided in HD)
- Audio Commentaries
  - Jerry Beck on Elmer's Candid Camera, What's Cookin', Doc? and 8 Ball Bunny
  - Greg Ford on A Wild Hare, Hold, the Lion, Please!, The Old Grey Hare, Bugs Bunny Rides Again and What's Up, Doc?
  - Michael Barrier on Bugs Bunny Gets the Boid and Haredevil Hare
  - Paul Dini on Super-Rabbit
  - Stan Freberg on Bugs Bunny and the Three Bears
  - Constantine Nasr on Hare Ribbin'
  - Eric Goldberg on Baseball Bugs
  - Greg Ford and Michael Barrier on Hair-Raising Hare

== Disc 2 ==
- LT = Looney Tunes
- MM = Merrie Melodies
- (*) = Newly Restored for Blu-ray

#	Title	Co-stars	Release date	Director	Series
1	Rabbit of Seville	Elmer	December 16, 1950	Chuck Jones	LT
2	Rabbit Every Monday (*)	Sam	February 10, 1951	Friz Freleng	LT
3	The Fair-Haired Hare (*)	Sam	April 14, 1951	Friz Freleng	LT
4	Rabbit Fire	Daffy, Elmer	May 19, 1951	Chuck Jones	LT
5	His Hare-Raising Tale (*)	Clyde	August 11, 1951	Friz Freleng	LT
6	Hare Lift (*)	Sam	December 20, 1952	Friz Freleng	LT
7	Upswept Hare (*)	Elmer	March 14, 1953	Robert McKimson	MM
8	Robot Rabbit (*)	Elmer	December 12, 1953	Friz Freleng	LT
9	Captain Hareblower (*)	Sam	January 16, 1954	Friz Freleng	MM
10	No Parking Hare (*)		May 1, 1954	Robert McKimson	LT
11	Yankee Doodle Bugs (*)	Clyde	August 28, 1954	Friz Freleng	LT
12	Lumber Jack-Rabbit (Note: Previously restored and released as part of Looney Tunes Super Stars' Bugs Bunny: Hare Extraordinaire albeit in cropped "widescreen" form. Presented in its correct 4:3 aspect ratio for this release.)		September 25, 1953	Chuck Jones	LT
13	Baby Buggy Bunny		December 18, 1954	Chuck Jones	MM
14	Hare Brush (*)	Elmer	May 7, 1955	Friz Freleng	MM
15	This Is a Life? (Note: Previously restored and released as part of Looney Tunes Super Stars' Daffy Duck: Frustrated Fowl albeit in cropped "widescreen" form. Presented in its correct 4:3 aspect ratio for this release.)	Daffy, Elmer, Sam	July 9, 1955	Friz Freleng	MM
16	Rabbitson Crusoe (*)	Sam	April 28, 1956	Friz Freleng	LT
17	Napoleon Bunny-Part		June 16, 1956	Friz Freleng	MM
18	Half-Fare Hare (*)		August 18, 1956	Robert McKimson	MM
19	Piker's Peak (*)	Sam	May 25, 1957	Friz Freleng	LT
20	What's Opera, Doc?	Elmer	July 6, 1957	Chuck Jones	MM

=== Special Features ===
- Bugs Bunny/Looney Tunes All-Star 50th Anniversary
- Behind the Tunes Featurettes
  - A-Hunting We Will Go: Chuck Jones' Wabbit Season Twilogy
  - Bugs Bunny: Ain't He a Stinker
  - Wagnerian Wabbit: The Making of "What's Opera, Doc?"
- Audio Commentaries
  - Eric Goldberg on Rabbit of Seville
  - Greg Ford on Rabbit Every Monday and Rabbit Fire
  - Constantine Nasr on The Fair-Haired Hare and Baby Buggy Bunny
  - Jerry Beck on Lumber Jack-Rabbit
  - Daniel Goldmark on What's Opera, Doc?
  - Chuck Jones, Maurice Noble and Michael Maltese (via archival recording) on What's Opera, Doc?
- Alternate Audio Tracks
  - Music Only Tracks for Baby Buggy Bunny, Rabbit Fire and What's Opera, Doc?
  - Vocal Only Tracks for What's Opera, Doc?

== Disc 3 ==
- LT = Looney Tunes
- MM = Merrie Melodies
- (*) = Newly Restored for Blu-ray

#	Title	Co-stars	Release date	Director	Series
1	Bugsy and Mugsy (*)	Rocky and Mugsy	August 31, 1957	Friz Freleng	LT
2	Show Biz Bugs	Daffy	November 2, 1957	Friz Freleng	LT
3	Hare-Less Wolf (*)		February 1, 1958	Friz Freleng	MM
4	Now, Hare This (*)	B.B. Wolf	May 31, 1958	Robert McKimson	LT
5	Knighty Knight Bugs	Sam	August 23, 1958	Friz Freleng	LT
6	Hare-Abian Nights (*)	Sam	February 28, 1959	Ken Harris	MM
7	Backwoods Bunny (*)		June 13, 1959	Robert McKimson	MM
8	Wild and Woolly Hare (*)	Sam	August 1, 1959	Friz Freleng	LT
9	Bonanza Bunny (*)	Blacque Jacque	September 5, 1959	Robert McKimson	MM
10	People Are Bunny	Daffy	December 19, 1959	Robert McKimson	MM
11	Person to Bunny	Daffy, Elmer	April 1, 1960	Friz Freleng	MM
12	Rabbit's Feat (*)	Wile E.	June 4, 1960	Chuck Jones	LT
13	From Hare to Heir	Sam	September 3, 1960	Friz Freleng	MM
14	Compressed Hare (*)	Wile E.	July 29, 1961	Chuck Jones and Maurice Noble	MM
15	Prince Violent (*)	Sam	September 2, 1961	Friz Freleng and Hawley Pratt	LT
16	Shishkabugs (*)	Sam	December 8, 1962	Friz Freleng	LT
17	The Million Hare	Daffy	April 6, 1963	Robert McKimson	LT
18	The Unmentionables (*)	Rocky and Mugsy	September 7, 1963	Friz Freleng	MM
19	False Hare	B.B. Wolf, Foghorn (cameo)	July 18, 1964	Robert McKimson	LT
20	(Blooper) Bunny	Daffy, Elmer, Sam	June 13, 1997	Greg Ford and Terry Lennon	MM

=== Special Features ===
- Behind the Tunes Featurettes
  - Hard Luck Duck
  - Short Fuse Shootout: The Small Tale of Yosemite Sam
  - 50 Years of Bugs Bunny in 3½ Minutes
- Audio Commentaries
  - Greg Ford on Show Biz Bugs, Rabbit's Feat, From Hare to Heir and (Blooper) Bunny
  - Jerry Beck on Knighty Knight Bugs and False Hare
- Ten Looney Tunes Cartoons Episodes
  - Harm Wrestling
  - Big League Beast
  - Pool Bunny
  - Pest Coaster
  - Buzzard School
  - Siberian Sam
  - Grilled Rabbit
  - Vincent Van Fudd
  - Hare Restoration
  - Mini Elmer/Plunger/Moving Hole/Bees
