= Dumb Patrol =

1964 short film by Gerry Chiniquy

- Title card (unrestored)
- Directed by: Gerry Chiniquy
- Story by: John Dunn
- Starring: Mel Blanc (all voices)
- Edited by: Treg Brown
- Music by: Bill Lava
- Animation by: Virgil Ross; Bob Matz; Lee Halpern; Art Leonardi
- Layouts by: Bob Givens
- Backgrounds by: Tom O'Loughlin
- Color process: Technicolor
- Production company: Warner Bros. Cartoons
- Distributed by: Warner Bros. Pictures; Vitaphone
- Release date: January 18, 1964
- Running time: 6 minutes
- Language: English

Dumb Patrol is a 1964 Warner Bros. Looney Tunes cartoon short directed by Gerry Chiniquy. It was released on January 18, 1964, and stars Bugs Bunny and Yosemite Sam. Director Gerry Chiniquy was a longtime animator in Friz Freleng's unit; Freleng helped animate a short of the same name starring Bosko three decades prior. The cartoon is set during World War I opening 'somewhere in France' in 1917, and it also commemorates the 50th anniversary of the war.

== Plot ==
Set amidst the backdrop of World War I in France in 1917, the French Air Force convenes to address the threat posed by the formidable German pilot, Baron Sam Von Shpamm. A decision is made through the drawing of straws, with Captain Smedley emerging as the chosen aviator tasked with confronting the enemy. Things take an unexpected turn when Bugs Bunny incapacitates Smedley to assume his identity. This subterfuge is driven by Bugs' concern for Smedley's familial responsibilities.

Meanwhile, in Germany, Baron Sam expresses disillusionment with his military accolades and yearns for respite. He receives a taunting message from Bugs, further provoking his ire.

As aerial confrontations ensue, Baron Sam's ineptitude is highlighted through a series of mishaps, including failed attempts to engage his aircraft and futile pursuits of Bugs. Despite his persistent efforts, Baron Sam's endeavors are consistently thwarted by Bugs' cunning evasion tactics. Baron Sam ultimately resorts to increasingly desperate measures, culminating in his demise amidst a calamitous explosion.

== Reception ==
Animation historian Jerry Beck considers Dumb Patrol to be among the worst Bugs Bunny cartoons.

== Home media ==
The film is available on the Looney Tunes Collector's Choice: Volume 3 Blu-ray.

== See also ==
- List of American films of 1964
- List of Bugs Bunny cartoons
- List of Yosemite Sam cartoons

Preceded by Transylvania 6-5000	Bugs Bunny Cartoons; 1964	Succeeded by Dr. Devil and Mr. Hare
