= The Million Hare =

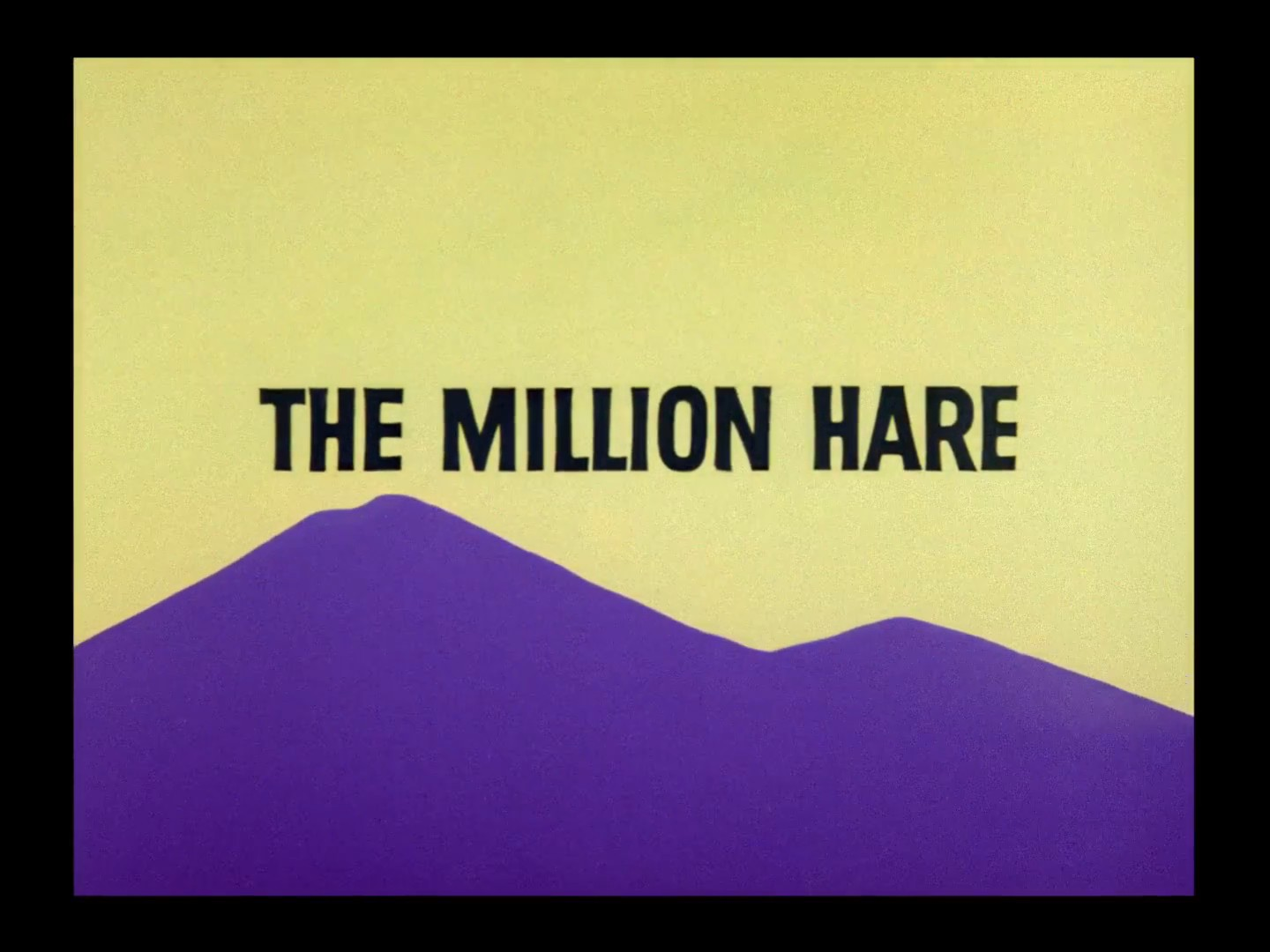
- Title card
- Directed by: Robert McKimson
- Story by: Dave Detiege
- Starring: Mel Blanc (all voices)
- Edited by: Treg Brown
- Music by: Bill Lava
- Animation by: Warren Batchelder; Ted Bonnicksen; George Grandpre; Keith Darling; Special Effects: Harry Love
- Layouts by: Robert Gribbroek
- Backgrounds by: Robert Gribbroek
- Color process: Technicolor
- Production company: Warner Bros. Cartoons
- Distributed by: Vitaphone; Warner Bros. Pictures
- Release date: April 6, 1963 (USA)
- Running time: 6:16
- Language: English

The Million Hare is a 1963 Warner Bros. Looney Tunes theatrical cartoon short directed by Robert McKimson. The short was released on April 6, 1963, and stars Bugs Bunny and Daffy Duck. In this film, Bugs and Daffy compete in a game show.

Clips from The Million Hare were used, with color commentary by John Madden and Pat Summerall, as part of the fourth quarter of the 2001 Cartoon Network special The Big Game XXIX: Bugs vs. Daffy.

== Plot ==
The narrative unfolds within the subterranean abode of Bugs Bunny, who is joined by Daffy Duck. Their tranquility is interrupted by the televised spectacle of the game show Beat Your Buddy, where chance favors Bugs and Daffy as selected contestants for a tantalizing prize: "a million bucks".

The ensuing race to claim the coveted reward unfolds as a testament to Daffy's relentless pursuit, juxtaposed against Bugs' composed and methodical approach. Despite encountering numerous setbacks, Daffy's determination propels him forward, albeit accompanied by his own impetuous missteps.

Bugs' calculated journey culminates in his arrival at the studio ahead of Daffy, only to be whisked away in a tumultuous escapade involving a jet pack and an unexpected landing in an antique glass shop. Undeterred by their injuries, the indomitable duo presses on, with Daffy ultimately crossing the finish line first.

However, the anticipated windfall reveals itself to be a whimsical double twist — the prize is not a million bucks, but a "million box", meaning one million small boxes. Considering it worthless, Daffy decides to give it to Bugs. But then it is revealed that each of the boxes contains a one dollar bill, so it is a million dollars after all and Daffy has squandered his win.

When he's asked for his comments, Daffy's head turns into that of a jackass and he responds by braying.

== Home media ==
The Million Hare is available on the Looney Tunes Super Stars' Bugs Bunny: Hare Extraordinaire and The Best of Bugs Bunny DVDs cropped to widescreen format. This short can also be found in its original aspect ratio on the Bugs Bunny 80th Anniversary Collection Blu-ray set.

== See also ==
- List of American films of 1963
- List of cartoons featuring Daffy Duck
- List of Bugs Bunny cartoons

Preceded by Devil's Feud Cake	Bugs Bunny Cartoons; 1963	Succeeded by Hare-Breadth Hurry
