= The Unmentionables =

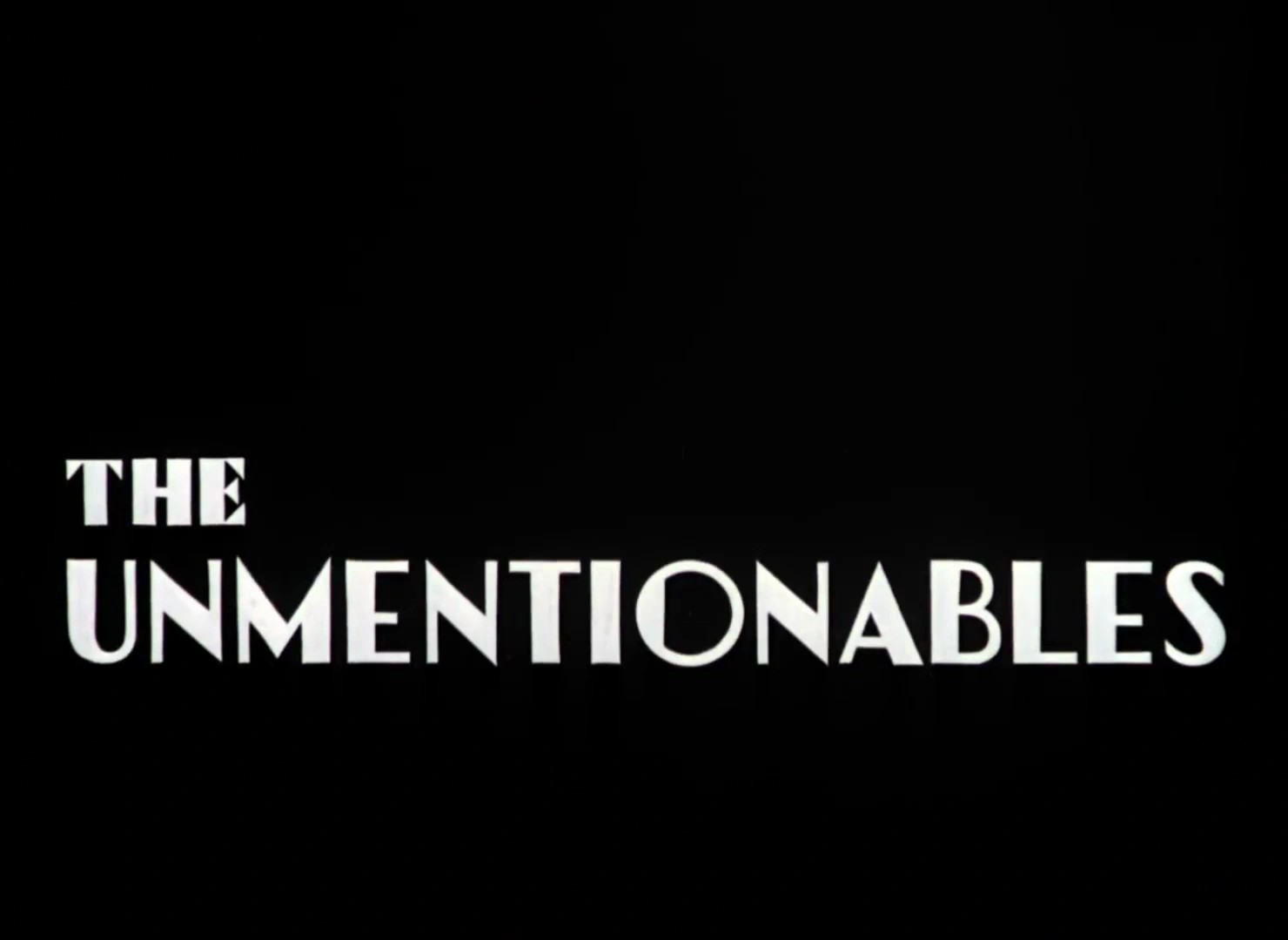
- Title card
- Directed by: Friz Freleng
- Story by: John Dunn
- Produced by: David H. DePatie
- Starring: Mel Blanc; Ralph James
- Edited by: Treg Brown
- Music by: Bill Lava
- Animation by: Gerry Chiniquy; Virgil Ross; Bob Matz; Art Leonardi; Lee Halpern
- Layouts by: Hawley Pratt
- Backgrounds by: Tom O'Loughlin
- Color process: Technicolor
- Production company: Warner Bros. Cartoons
- Distributed by: Vitaphone; Warner Bros. Pictures
- Release date: September 7, 1963
- Running time: 6:22
- Language: English

The Unmentionables is a 1963 Warner Bros. Merrie Melodies cartoon directed by Friz Freleng. The short was released on September 7, 1963, and stars Bugs Bunny. The short serves as a parody of The Untouchables, with Bugs in the role of "Elegant Mess", a spoof of Eliot Ness.

== Plot ==
Against the backdrop of the Roaring Twenties, characterized by jazz, evolving fashion trends, lively dance soirées, and rampant mobster activity, Bugs, under the guise of Agent Elegant Mess, is tasked by his superior to penetrate the criminal underworld of Chicago.

During his journey, Bugs encounters the notorious duo Rocky and Mugsy, who apprehend and attempt to dispose of him in Lake Michigan, employing the notorious "concrete shoes" method. However, Bugs resourcefully utilizes a pipe as a snorkel to evade peril.

Subsequently, Bugs disrupts Rocky's birthday celebration by cleverly infiltrating the event disguised as a flapper, ultimately exposing himself and orchestrating Rocky's arrest under the guise of a police inspector. Despite Rocky's resistance, Bugs ingeniously employs a carrot, which conceals a surprising mechanism, to subdue the criminals.

A pursuit ensues, culminating in a confrontation within the confines of an ACME Cereal Factory. Through cunning manipulation of the factory's machinery, Bugs successfully incapacitates Rocky and Mugsy, leading to their apprehension and subsequent sentencing to twenty years of labor at Juliet Prison.

In a comedic twist, Bugs finds himself having to spend the sentence with his adversaries, having misplaced the keys to their restraints.

== Production notes ==
Notably, this production marked a departure from the convention of crediting Mel Blanc alone for voice roles in Warner Bros. cartoons, as Ralph James received credit for his contribution. Conversely, Julie Bennett's voice work as a telephone operator went uncredited in this instance.

== See also ==
- List of Bugs Bunny cartoons

Preceded by Hare-Breadth Hurry	The Unmentionables; 1963	Succeeded by Mad as a Mars Hare
