= Looney Tunes Super Stars' Bugs Bunny: Hare Extraordinaire =

2010 American DVD

Bugs Bunny: Hare Extraordinaire
- DVD cover
- Directed by: Friz Freleng, Robert McKimson, Chuck Jones
- Produced by: Eddie Selzer, John W. Burton, David H. DePatie
- Starring: Bugs Bunny, Yosemite Sam, Tasmanian Devil, Granny, Daffy Duck, Marvin the Martian, Mel Blanc (voice)
- Distributed by: Warner Home Video
- Release date: August 10, 2010 (United States)
- Running time: 125 minutes
- Country: United States
- Language: English

Looney Tunes Super Stars' Bugs Bunny: Hare Extraordinaire is a DVD of 15 new-to-DVD Bugs Bunny cartoons released on August 10, 2010. Along with Daffy Duck: Frustrated Fowl, these two DVDs are the successor to the Looney Tunes Golden Collection series. None of the cartoons featured in this DVD were previously found on the Golden Collection sets.

== Contents ==
All cartoons on this disc star Bugs Bunny.

#	Title	Co-stars	Year	Director	Series
1	Mutiny on the Bunny	Sam	1950	Friz Freleng	LT
2	Bushy Hare		1950	Robert McKimson	LT
3	Hare We Go		1951	Robert McKimson	MM
4	Foxy by Proxy	Willoughby	1952	Friz Freleng	MM
5	Hare Trimmed	Granny, Sam	1953	Friz Freleng	MM
6	^Lumber Jack-Rabbit		1953	Chuck Jones	LT
7	^Napoleon Bunny-Part		1956	Friz Freleng	MM
8	^Bedevilled Rabbit	Taz	1957	Robert McKimson	MM
9	^Apes of Wrath	Daffy (cameo)	1959	Friz Freleng	MM
10	^From Hare to Heir	Sam	1960	Friz Freleng	MM
11	^Lighter Than Hare	Sam	1960	Friz Freleng	MM
12	^The Million Hare	Daffy	1963	Robert McKimson	LT
13	^Mad as a Mars Hare	Marvin	1963	Chuck Jones, Maurice Noble	MM
14	^Dr. Devil and Mr. Hare	Taz	1964	Robert McKimson	MM
15	^False Hare	Foghorn (cameo)	1964	Robert McKimson	LT

(^) - Cropped to widescreen.

== Controversies ==
This was one of two first Looney Tunes Super Stars that released the majority of some of the cartoons but in a 1:85 widescreen format. Warner Bros. has stated the reason for this was because that was how the post-1953 cartoons were shown in theaters, which made many collectors upset as they were filmed in Academy full-screened ratio, not widescreen.

In 2011 Bedevilled Rabbit, Mad as a Mars Hare and Dr. Devil and Mr. Hare were re-released as part of the Looney Tunes Platinum Collection: Volume 1 DVD and Blu-Ray set presenting them in their original 4:3 aspect ratios.

In 2018, Apes of Wrath was released as part of the Stars of Space Jam: Bugs Bunny DVD, and later in 2020 was re-released on the Looney Tunes Parodies Collection DVD set: both releases presenting the short in its original 4:3 aspect ratio. Also in 2020, Lumber Jack-Rabbit, Napoleon Bunny-Part, From Hare to Heir, The Million Hare and False Hare were included as part of the Bugs Bunny 80th Anniversary Collection Blu-Ray set, and were once again presented in their original 4:3 aspect ratios.

In 2024, Lighter Than Hare was re-released in its correct 4:3 aspect ratio as part of the Looney Tunes Collector's Choice: Volume 4 Blu-Ray - officially correcting all the cartoons cropped to widescreen on the Hare Extraordinaire DVD.
