= Speedy Ghost to Town =

- Title card
- Directed by: Alex Lovy
- Story by: Cal Howard
- Starring: Mel Blanc (all voices)
- Edited by: Hal Geer
- Music by: William Lava
- Animation by: Laverne Harding; Volus Jones; Ed Solomon; Ted Bonnicksen
- Layouts by: David Hanan; Lin Larsen
- Backgrounds by: Bob Abrams
- Color process: Technicolor
- Production company: Warner Bros. Animation
- Distributed by: Warner Bros. Pictures; The Vitaphone Corporation
- Release date: July 29, 1967
- Running time: 6 minutes
- Language: English

Speedy Ghost to Town is a 1967 Warner Bros. Merrie Melodies cartoon directed by Alex Lovy. The short was released on July 29, 1967, and stars Daffy Duck and Speedy Gonzales. It is the first cartoon released under the newly reopened animation department of Warner Bros. Pictures (which had been acquired by Seven Arts Productions just two weeks prior) in 1967, as from 1964 to 1967, all Looney Tunes and Merrie Melodies cartoons were developed at DePatie–Freleng Enterprises and Format Productions instead. It is also the first Warner Bros. cartoon to be directed by Alex Lovy.

The cartoon marked a dramatic turning point for the Looney Tunes and Merrie Melodies series, making extensive use of limited animation similar to that of Filmation and Hanna-Barbera cartoons from the same time period (a drastic departure from the cartoons produced during the studio's heyday), simplistic backgrounds and character designs, and a more limited sound effects library (including some of Hanna-Barbera's familiar stock sounds).

== Plot ==
Speedy and his friend Miguel visit a ghost town in the desert, followed by Daffy. There, Speedy unveils what appears to be gold and a map to the location of the mine where more can be found. Daffy notices, and attempts to take the map; he is foiled by getting caught in the piano tape.

Daffy's next attempt involves setting up a phone with explosives. Speedy answers it when it rings, but quickly hands it to Daffy, saying he has a call; his plan backfires as he is blown up. Speedy teases him, "What's the matter, epa loco? You got the wrong number?" He takes off, Daffy in hot pursuit. Daffy finds him in a barrel, and throws a grenade in; however, he accidentally throws the pin, and not the actual grenade.

He then sticks his head through a hole in the fence, catching Speedy by the tail, but Miguel drops a horseshoe on him. Further antics ensue, including Daffy having a taxidermy bull head fall on him like a mask and Speedy (taking advantage of Daffy's appearance) acting as a matador, and Speedy hiding behind different-shaped bottles, only to get catsup in his eye on the last. Speedy and Miguel head to the mine, where Daffy repeatedly tries to throw dynamite in, to blow them up; it eventually blows up right next to him.

Daffy then demands that Speedy give up the cart, which he does. However, it is not gold, but cheese! Daffy then really does go crazy, bouncing away and laughing hysterically. When Miguel asks "Gee whiz, Speedy, what's the matter with the loco duck?", Speedy shrugs, "I dunno. I guess maybe he don't like cheese."
