= Rabbitson Crusoe =

1956 film by Friz Freleng

- Title card
- Directed by: Friz Freleng
- Story by: Warren Foster
- Starring: Mel Blanc
- Music by: Milt Franklyn
- Animation by: Gerry Chiniquy; Art Davis; Virgil Ross
- Layouts by: Hawley Pratt
- Backgrounds by: Irv Wyner
- Color process: Technicolor
- Production company: Warner Bros. Cartoons
- Distributed by: Warner Bros. Pictures; The Vitaphone Corporation
- Release date: April 28, 1956 (U.S.)
- Running time: 7:25
- Language: English

Rabbitson Crusoe is a 1956 Warner Bros. Looney Tunes short directed by Friz Freleng. The short was released on April 28, 1956, and stars Bugs Bunny and Yosemite Sam.

== Plot ==
Yosemite Sam narrates that a low tide and high rocks got him shipwrecked on a small island. After the ship's remaining food stores have been used up, the only source of food is from coconut tree on an adjacent island. Crossing between the islands, however, is always difficult because of a man-eating shark called Dopey Dick (another parody, this time based on Moby-Dick). Sam manages to get rid of the shark, who jumps after him on land, only by having a mallet ready on the tree with which to whack the shark back. On his way back to his island, he's chased again by the shark, but this time has a baseball bat ready to whack the shark. Sam mutters that the shark has tried getting him for 20 years, but misses every time. As a result, one can infer that since the shipwreck, Sam has been marooned on the island for the amount of time described above.

Sam then uses a cookbook, 1000 Ways to Prepare Coconuts, to make a series of coconut dishes (specifically, a meal of "tossed coconut salad", "fresh coconut milk", and "New England boiled coconut"), but then grows sick of coconuts, banging his head against a tree in frustration—considering that Sam has lived on nothing but coconuts for 2 decades, his distaste for coconuts is understandable. Suddenly he hears Bugs Bunny in the distance, singing the song "Trade Winds" (a song Bugs apparently likes to sing while lost at sea - see also Gorilla My Dreams). Sam calls out to Bugs, who starts paddling towards the island. A high tide causes Bugs to fall into Sam's arms. Just as Bugs celebrates being on dry land, Sam tosses him in a stewing pot to cook. However, Bugs douses the flame with water from the pot. Sam then has to go back to his ship to get another match.

The shark nearly gets Sam on his way to the ship, but Sam distracts the shark with a bone (as if the shark was a dog), goes back to the ship (retrieving one match) and gets back to land. However, Bugs is not in the pot. When he checks the pot, the shark jumps out and starts eating Sam, but Sam manages to whack the shark with a mallet - soon whacking himself, when the shark jumps off. Bugs is then shown to be on the ship itself (calling out to Sam as "Mister Robinson", making direct reference to the story). "I'll get ya', ya' long-eared galoot!", Sam bellows. "Shark or no shark!!".

First, Sam tries riding a surfboard to the ship, but is almost swallowed by the shark. Next, Sam decides to outsmart both Bugs and the shark by tying a balloon around his waist and floating to the ship. However, Bugs (passing the time by singing a chorus of "Secret Love") is ready for this as well - when Sam floats down to the ship, Bugs opens a hatch that Sam floats into, with the shark waiting for him. Sam then manages to beat the shark back again.

Sam catches Bugs again and throws him into the pot, lighting the fire again. However, Bugs tries to point out that a tidal wave is heading for the island, but Sam told him to "Shuddup, and start simmerin!!!". Before Sam can do anything, the tidal wave sweeps across the island, leaving Bugs safe in his pot, but the island is gone, because it got swallowed by the waves. Sam, now being chased by Dopey Dick, swims to the pot, yelling for Bugs to pull him in. Bugs uses a pike pole to start pulling Sam in, but then tells Sam that he'll only keep him up if they make a deal. After a quick "No deal!", Sam eventually relents. The deal is that Bugs will keep Sam on the end of the pole to keep Sam above water, while Sam paddles. Sam looks back and sees the shark behind them and starts paddling faster, eventually going in the direction of San Francisco - which, according to a floating marker, is 2,736 miles away, with "California, Here I Come" playing in the underscore.

== Production notes ==
Rabbitson Crusoe is direct parody of Robinson Crusoe, humorously depicting the unlikely alliance between the two adversaries amidst their misadventures on the high seas.

== Home media ==
Rabbitson Crusoe was released on the Warner Home Video laserdisc Wince Upon A Time, the VHS release Bugs Bunny's Hare Raising Tales, and the DVD release Looney Tunes: Parodies Collection. In 2020 the cartoon was released uncut and digitally restored as part of the Bugs Bunny 80th Anniversary Collection Blu-ray.

== See also ==
- Looney Tunes and Merrie Melodies filmography (1950–1959)
- List of Bugs Bunny cartoons
- List of Yosemite Sam cartoons
