= False Hare =

1964 film by Robert McKimson

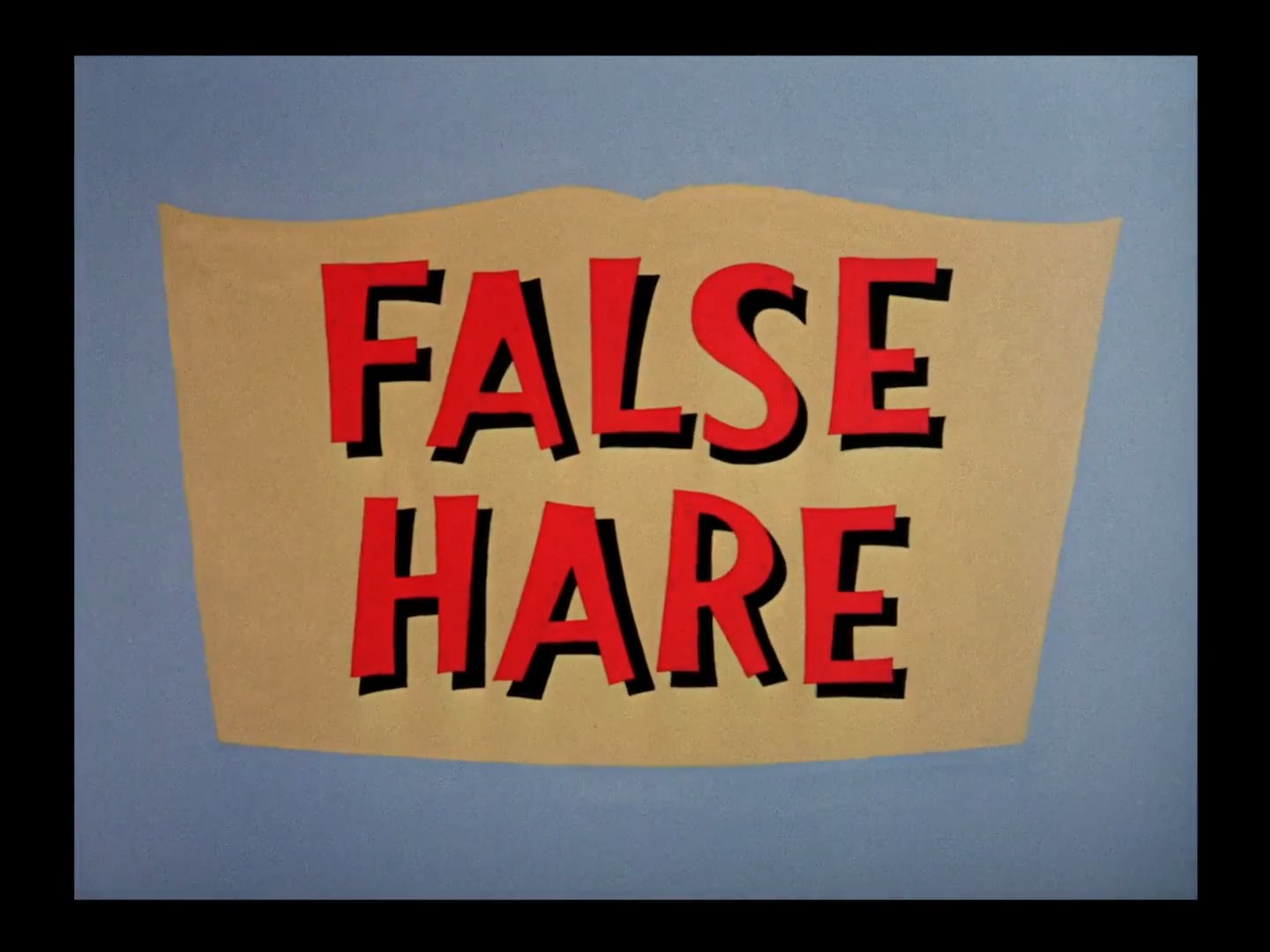
- Title card
- Directed by: Robert McKimson
- Story by: John Dunn
- Starring: Mel Blanc
- Edited by: Treg Brown
- Music by: Bill Lava
- Animation by: Warren Batchelder; George Grandpré; Ted Bonnicksen
- Layouts by: Bob Givens
- Backgrounds by: Robert Gribbroek
- Color process: Technicolor
- Production company: Warner Bros. Cartoons
- Distributed by: Warner Bros. Pictures; Vitagraph Company of America
- Release date: July 18, 1964
- Running time: 6 minutes
- Language: English

False Hare is a 1964 Warner Bros. Looney Tunes animated short directed by Robert McKimson. The short was released on July 18, 1964, and stars Bugs Bunny.

This cartoon was the last production completed by the original Warner Bros. Cartoons studio, and is also the last to feature the "target" opening and closing title cards, and the long-familiar version of "The Merry-Go-Round Broke Down" theme. This short is also well-known for being the final appearance of Bugs Bunny & Foghorn Leghorn during the Golden Age of American animation. The next theatrical Bugs Bunny short, Box-Office Bunny, would be released on February 8, 1991, 27 years later.

== Plot ==
The Big Bad Wolf, worshipped by his nephew, who calls him "Uncle Big Bad", creates Club Del Conejo, a club for rabbits, as his plot to lure a rabbit to be eaten for dinner. Bugs overhears Big Bad's plans, but is wise to his game. However, he plays along, just to stifle his boredom.

Big Bad admits Bugs in, and tricks him into signing an insurance form. Bugs' first initiation test is to ring a bell, rigged to cut a rope and let a safe fall on him. Bugs ticks off Big Bad by ringing the bell with a nail and a nickel. When Big Bad tells Bugs to hit the bell, Bugs merely flicks it, so Big Bad comes up to demonstrate himself how to do it. Big Bad gets flattened as a result.

Big Bad then tests out his next plan, to signal his nephew, so Big Bad's nephew will fling open a closet door, rigged to close an iron maiden on Bugs. Big Bad beckons Bugs for his club picture, with the iron maiden as a backdrop. Bugs pulls all sorts of poses, so Big Bad comes up to demonstrate the right pose. Bugs immediately says "I get it now," which signals the nephew to close the iron maiden—but instead closes it on his uncle. As Bugs steps out, the nephew peeks into the casket, and then closes it again, cringing.

Later, Big Bad tells Bugs to crawl through a hole which enters the mouth of a cannon. While Big Bad tells his nephew to pull the cord when he gives him the signal, Bugs paints another hole in the wall. When Big Bad sees there are two holes, Bugs tricks him into going into the booby-trapped one, so Big Bad gets blasted through the wall. Bugs then flips the wall so that when Big Bad demands a retry, he prevents Bugs from going into the booby-trapped one and gets blasted through the wall again.

Finally, Big Bad directs Bugs to climb inside a hollowed-out tree. Bugs climbs out when he sees the wolf pack it with explosives. The dynamite detonates and causes the tree to crash onto the Club Del Conejo. A battered Big Bad suggests opening a chicken club, and Foghorn Leghorn immediately appears eager to join. Bugs sits at a tree with the wolf's nephew, and closes the cartoon remarking: "I wonder which one will chicken out first", at which the latter laughs.

== Home media ==
False Hare is available, uncensored and uncut, on the Looney Tunes Super Stars: Bugs Bunny DVD cropped to widescreen. However, this short was later released on the Bugs Bunny 80th Anniversary Collection Blu-Ray set, in its original aspect ratio.

== See also ==
- List of American films of 1964
- List of Bugs Bunny cartoons

Preceded by The Iceman Ducketh	Bugs Bunny Cartoons; 1964	Succeeded by Bugs Bunny's Christmas Carol
