= John Dunn (animator) =

Scottish screenwriter and animator

John W. Dunn
- Born: 25 February 1919; Coatbridge, North Lanarkshire, Scotland
- Died: 17 January 1983 (aged 63); San Fernando, California, US
- Other names: John Dunn
- Years active: 1951–1983
- Employer(s): Walt Disney Productions (1951–1960); Warner Bros. Cartoons (1960–1963); DePatie–Freleng Enterprises (1963–1981); Grantray-Lawrence Animation (1967-68); Warner Bros. Animation (1980–1983)
- Children: 3

John W. Dunn (25 February 1919 – 17 January 1983) was a Scottish screenwriter and animator for animated cartoons, active from 1951 to 1983.

== Biography ==
Born on February 25, 1919, he graduated from Oroville High School, did comics during WWII in The Army Times, and studied at the California College of the Arts and the Chicago Academy of Fine Arts.

Dunn began his career at the Walt Disney cartoon studio in 1951 as a inbetweener, where his first animation credit—Man in Space—received an Oscar nomination. He moved to Warner Bros. Cartoons in 1960; there, he began with The Pied Piper of Guadalupe, which was also nominated for an Oscar. He and fellow Disney man David Detiege replaced Warner Brothers' top writers Michael Maltese and Warren Foster after they went to Hanna-Barbera to receive higher billing in the 1960s. He usually worked under Friz Freleng and Chuck Jones' units.

After the Warner's cartoon studio closed in 1963, Dunn joined DePatie–Freleng Enterprises; in 1964, he crafted the story for The Pink Phink, which earned the Oscar as Best Animated Short. He also went to Hanna-Barbera with Freleng to do storyboards for Hey There, It's Yogi Bear!. Many of his DePatie–Freleng cartoons re-use plots from Warner Brothers cartoons. He was a prolific story man over the next 19 years and also did some animation work for the 1967 Spider-Man series.

Dunn died in San Fernando, California of heart failure on 17 January 1983.
