= List of Toon In with Me episodes (2022) =

This is a list of episodes of the American live-action/animated anthology comedy television series Toon In with Me that aired on MeTV in 2022.

== Episodes ==
No. overall	No. in year	Title	Original release date
236	1	"National Thank God It's Monday Day/Festival of Sleep"	January 3, 2022
Bill and Toony have a competition to determine which January 1st holiday is better: Festival of Sleep Day, or Thank God It's Monday Day. Featured cartoons: Rabbit Every Monday (1951), Cock-a-Doodle Dog (1951), Not Now (1936), Assault and Flattery (1956), Tweet Dreams (1959)
237	2	"New Year, New Bill"	January 4, 2022
Bill and Toony celebrate the New Year with cartoons that were originally released during the first week of January. Featured cartoons: Little Red Riding Rabbit (1944), Dog Pounded (1954), Happy Go Ducky (1958), The Astroduck (1966), Sky Blue Pink (1968)
238	3	"Bill Is Predict-a-Bill"	January 5, 2022
Toony predicts everything Bill is going to do, because, according to Toony, Bill's predictable. Featured cartoons: The Old Grey Hare (1944), The Hep Cat (1942), An Ounce of Pink (1965), Cat and Dupli-Cat (1967), Tweety's Circus (1955)
239	4	"Stuff & Nonsense #15"	January 6, 2022
Bill has a donut, a potato and a note in his lunchbox, Sockeye Sam is a market investor, Bill gets hurt playing Paper Football, appears on "Hats Magazine" and Sue does team exercising. Featured cartoons: Muscle Tussle (1953), Porky's Poppa (1938), The Little Match Girl (1937), The Cat's Me-Ouch! (1965), Pink Pistons (1966)
240	5	"Fantastic Friday #14"	January 7, 2022
On this "Fan-Tastic Friday" episode, Bill shows off his vintage Viewmaster to Toony. Featured cartoons: Big Top Bunny (1951), Matinee Idol Popeye (1960), Booby Hatched (1944), Jerry's Cousin (1951), Thumb Fun (1952)
241	6	"Yee Howdy: Where's the John?"	January 10, 2022
Bill and Toony watch another episode of the rural comedy show "Yee Howdy."; Featured cartoons: Don't Axe Me (1958), Farm Frolics (1941), Country Boy (1935), Cattle Battle (1971), Sock a Doodle Do (1952)
242	7	"Toony Gets a Business Card"	January 11, 2022
When everyone has their own business card, Toony decides to get one too. Featured cartoons: To Hare Is Human (1956), A Star is Hatched (1938), Spree Lunch (1957), Super Pink (1966), Fowl Weather (1953)
243	8	"Tic Tac Toony 2"	January 12, 2022
Bill and the gang play another round of the game show "Tic Tac Toony". Featured cartoons: Mad as a Mars Hare (1963), Muscle Beach Tom (1956), Hot Air Aces (1949), In the Pink of the Night (1969), One Droopy Knight (1957)
244	9	"Bill Wigs Out"	January 13, 2022
Jenn Zee and the Aliennabbers believe that Bill is aging backwards after he accidentally glues a wig to the top of his head. Featured cartoons: Duck Dodgers and the Return of the 24½th Century (1980), D' Fightin' Ones (1961), Just Ducky (1953), Rocket-Bye Baby (1956), Rabbit of Seville (1950)
245	10	"Fantastic Friday #15"	January 14, 2022
It's the 15th "Fan-Tastic Friday" episode. Featured cartoons: Droopy's Double Trouble (1951), Mouse Into Space (1962), Bugs Bunny Rides Again (1948), The Pink Phink (1964), Fastest with the Mostest (1960)
246	11	"Sockeye in NYC"	January 17, 2022
Sockeye takes a trip to New York City. Featured cartoons: A Hare Grows in Manhattan (1947), The Mouse on 57th Street (1961), The Paneless Window Washer (1937), Think Before You Pink (1969), Hush My Mouse (1946)
247	12	"Toons Were Fine in '59"	January 19, 2022
The gang takes a look at cartoons released in 1959. Featured cartoons: Wild and Woolly Hare (1959), A Mutt in a Rut (1959), Mouse-Placed Kitten (1959), Wild About Hurry (1959), Hare-Abian Nights (1959)
248	13	"Simon Shock's Screaming Horror Theater"	January 20, 2022
Shock jock Simon Shock uses the show to audition as Svengoolie's backup. Featured cartoons: The Abominable Snow Rabbit (1961), The Flying Sorceress (1956), Deduce, You Say! (1956), Spooky Swabs (1957), Claws for Alarm (1954)
249	14	"Fantastic Friday #16"	January 21, 2022
In another "Fan-Tastic Friday", Bill and Toony take requests and answer mail from viewers. Featured cartoons: Baton Bunny (1959), Chicken Jitters (1939), Lonesome Lenny (1946), Hold the Wire (1936), Lumber Jerks (1955)
250	15	"Strangeness on a Train"	January 24, 2022
Sue P. hosts the show (guided by viewer feedback) while Boxcar teaches Bill how to travel by freight car. Featured cartoons: Half-Fare Hare (1956), Porky's Railroad (1937), I'm Just Wild About Jerry (1965), Onion Pacific (1940), All a Bir-r-r-d (1950)
251	16	"Opposite Day II"	January 25, 2022
Toony tries to get Bill to act unlike himself for Opposite Day, but Bill's nice guy personality changes everyone else to be more like him. Featured cartoons: Hare Brush (1955), Hyde and Go Tweet (1960), Dr. Jekyll and Mr. Mouse (1947), Put-Put, Pink (1968), Ventriloquist Cat (1950)
252	17	"Stuff & Nonsense #16"	January 26, 2022
Sue Thsayer predicts the future, Bill finds a skeleton in his closet, and Toony gets mesmerized by a lava lamp. Featured cartoons: Tom's Photo Finish (1957), The Scared Crows (1939), Porky Chops (1949), The Genie with the Light Pink Fur (1966), Tweet and Sour (1956)
253	18	"Attack of the Volunteers"	January 27, 2022
Bill and Toony enlist volunteers to help mail out marketing packets for the network (so Toony can do as little as possible). Featured cartoons: Devil May Hare (1954), The Two-Alarm Fire (1934), Pink Valiant (1968), Happy-Go-Nutty (1944), Jerry and Jumbo (1953)
254	19	"Fantastic Friday #17"	January 28, 2022
It's another "Fan-Tastic Friday" on the show. Featured cartoons: Birds of a Father (1961), A Witch's Tangled Hare (1959), Little Gravel Voice (1942), Les Miserobots (1968), The Shooting of Dan McGoo (1945)
255	20	"Yee Chowdy!"	January 31, 2022
Bill and Toony learn that Goldie Fisher is the owner of a restaurant called Yee Chowdy. Featured cartoons: Bedevilled Rabbit (1957), The Mouse from H.U.N.G.E.R. (1967), We Aim to Please (1934), Behind the Meat-Ball (1945), Strangled Eggs (1961)
256	21	"Mixtapes Will Happen"	February 1, 2022
Bill and Toony take a look back at some classical musical moments -- from both Toon In with Me and cartoon history. Featured cartoons: Solid Serenade (1946), Three Little Bops (1957), Symphony in Spinach (1948), Freudy Cat (1964), What's Opera, Doc? (1957)
257	22	"Toony Gets an Intern"	February 2, 2022
Toony gets his own intern. Featured cartoons: Person to Bunny (1960), That's My Mommy (1955), The Pink Tail Fly (1965), Ain't She Tweet (1952), A Fox in a Fix (1951)
258	23	"There's Been a Murder!"	February 3, 2022
It's murder mystery day as Bill and Toony try to solve the Case of the Killed Pizza Slice. Featured cartoons: The Super Snooper (1952), London Derrière (1968), Pinkfinger (1965), Big House Blues (1947), The Unmentionables (1963)
259	24	"Fantastic Friday #18"	February 4, 2022
It's another "Fan-Tastic Friday". Featured cartoons: Road Runner a Go-Go (1965), Slap Happy Lion (1947), Pecos Pest (1955), The Pique Poquette of Paris (1966), Fish and Slips (1962)
260	25	"Soup-Off"	February 8, 2022
Bill and Toony judge a soup-making competition. Featured cartoons: Soup or Sonic (1980), Matinee Mouse (1966), The Pink Package Plot (1968), Garden Gopher (1950), Daffy's Inn Trouble (1961)
261	26	"The Cane Mutation"	February 9, 2022
Bill receives a cane as a cereal prize, but soon finds out it's more trouble than it's worth. Featured cartoons: Show Biz Bugs (1957), She-Sick Sailors (1944), Whizzard of Ow (2003), Pink-A-Rella (1969), The Flying Cat (1952)
262	27	"Toons and More From '54"	February 10, 2022
Bill and Toony take a look at cartoons released in 1954, while Bill's parents recall their first date. Featured cartoons: My Little Duckaroo (1954), Popeye's 20th Anniversary (1954), Wild Wife (1954), Billy Boy (1954), I Gopher You (1954)
263	28	"Fantastic Friday #19"	February 11, 2022
It's another "Fan-Tastic Friday"! Featured cartoons: Drag-A-Long Droopy (1954), Wild Elephinks (1933), I Wanna Be a Sailor (1937), Really Scent (1959), Big House Bunny (1950)
264	29	"Valentine's Day II"	February 14, 2022
Bill isn't crazy about celebrating Valentine's Day, a choice that causes the MeTV Love Meter to fall to dangerously low levels. Featured cartoons: Hare Splitter (1948), Love Me, Love My Mouse (1966), Don't Look Now (1936), Nearlyweds (1957), The Stupid Cupid (1944)
265	30	"Toon In with Me PD"	February 16, 2022
Bill and Toony try to present a show about the Public Domain, but it soon devolves into a show about police departments. Featured cartoons: Wackiki Wabbit (1943), Swallow The Leader (1949), Ancient Fistory (1953), Le Ball and Chain Gang (1968), His Bitter Half (1950)
266	31	"Toons Through the Decade"	February 17, 2022
Bill and Toony look back at 4 decades worth of cartoons from the 1930s through the 1960s. Featured cartoons: Daffy Duck in Hollywood (1938), The Bashful Buzzard (1945), Cellbound (1955), Pinto Pink (1967), Rebel Rabbit (1949); Special Guest Appearance: Bill Kurtis as himself.
267	32	"Fantastic Friday #20"	February 18, 2022
It's the 20th "Fan-Tastic Friday". Featured cartoons: Kit for Cat (1948), Betty Boop's Ker-Choo (1933), Robin Hood Daffy (1958), 3 Ring Wing-Ding (1968), Puppy Tale (1954)
268	33	"Of All the Presidents, Man…"	February 21, 2022
Toony and Bill get a surprise visit from a former U.S. President in honor of President's Day. Featured cartoons: Ballot Box Bunny (1951), G.I. Pink (1968), Grape Nutty (1949), Popeye for President (1956), Conrad the Sailor (1942)
269	34	"2 by 2 on 2/22/22"	February 22, 2022
A flood in the studio forces the Toon In with Me gang to evacuate in pairs. Featured cartoons: Yankee Doodle Daffy (1943), Canary Row (1950), Hic-cup Pup (1954), Fox-Terror (1957), Beep, Beep (1952)
270	35	"National Toast Day"	February 24, 2022
Bill and Toony find out that Mob Lobster's soul has been trapped in a piece of bread on National Toast Day. Featured cartoons: Nasty Quacks (1945), The House of Tomorrow (1949), Porky's Cafe (1942), Bird's In Love (1936), Going! Going! Gosh! (1952)
271	36	"Fantastic Friday #21"	February 25, 2022
It's another "Fan-Tastic Friday". Featured cartoons: Pre-Hysterical Hare (1958), Red Hot Rangers (1947), Rocket to Mars (1946), Loco Lobo (1947), Riff Raffy Daffy (1948)
272	37	"Wacky Neighbors"	March 1, 2022
Bill and Toony get new neighbors. Featured cartoons: Compressed Hare (1961), Duel Personality (1966), Naughty Neighbors (1939), Crow De Guerre (1967), Crowing Pains (1947)
273	38	"Bah, Misty!"	March 2, 2022
Bill and Toony surprise Misty Drizzle on her birthday. Themed cartoons feature Bugs Bunny, Popeye and Daffy Duck. Featured cartoons: (Blooper) Bunny (1991), Popeye Presents Eugene the Jeep (1940), Fiesta Fiasco (1967), Grampy's Indoor Outing (1936), War and Pieces (1964)
274	39	"The Toony Zone"	March 3, 2022
Toony is left to host the show by himself when Bill doesn't show up for work. When no one can remember who Bill is, Toony must do more than introduce cartoons. Classic feature Bugs Bunny, Pink Panther, and Tom & Jerry. Featured cartoons: Bugsy and Mugsy (1957), Hospitaliky (1937), Pink Panzer (1965), Bats in the Belfry (1942), Jerry and the Goldfish (1951)
275	40	"Fantastic Friday #22"	March 4, 2022
Bill and Toony celebrate another "Fan-Tastic Friday". Featured cartoons: Hurdy-Gurdy Hare (1950), Honeymoon Hotel (1934), French Rarebit (1951), Chimp & Zee (1968), The Cat Concerto (1947)
276	41	"Emotional Roller Coaster"	March 7, 2022
Sue P. from Sales gets stuck on a roller coaster, and Bill becomes very emotional. Featured cartoons: Satan's Waitin' (1954), Curious Puppy (1939), Duck Soup to Nuts (1944), Abusement Park (1947), A Broken Leghorn (1959)
277	42	"Attack of the 50 ft. Sventoonie!"	March 8, 2022
Bill and Toony create a giant-sized problem when they accidentally let their growth ray fall into the wrong hands. Featured cartoons: Tweety and the Beanstalk (1957), Beanstalk Bunny (1955), Pre-Hysterical Man (1948), Jerry-Go-Round (1966), Jack-Wabbit and the Beanstalk (1943)
278	43	"Toony's Island"	March 9, 2022
Bill, Toony and the gang do a take-off on reality TV shows. Featured cartoons: Bonanza Bunny (1959), Jerry's Diary (1949), Popeye Meets William Tell (1940), The Pink Quarterback (1968), Ducking the Devil (1957)
279	44	"The Ballad of Mildred Vanilla"	March 10, 2022
Bill and Toony show another episode of the old country variety show, "Yee Howdy". Featured cartoons: Weasel Stop (1956), Fistic Mystic (1969), Texas Tom (1950), Musical Mountaineers (1939), Hillbilly Hare (1950)
280	45	"Fantastic Friday #23"	March 11, 2022
It's time for another "Fan-Tastic Friday" where Bill and Toony read viewer comments and take requests. Plus, a brand-new Super Tooner is announced. Featured cartoons: Guided Muscle (1955), Wimmin Hadn't Oughta Drive (1940), King-Size Canary (1947), War and Pieces (1970), Doggone Cats (1947)
281	46	"Pie-In' This Guy"	March 14, 2022
Bill, Toony and the gang celebrate Pi Day. Featured cartoons: Slick Hare (1947), A Pizza Tweety Pie (1958), Pink Paradise (1967), Slicked-up Pup (1951), Of Rice and Hen (1953)
282	47	"March Mayhem"	March 15, 2022
Toony hosts a tournament to see if anyone can make Bill angry. Featured cartoons: From Hare to Heir (1960), The Wild Chase (1965), Taxi-Turvy (1954), The Mad Maestro (1939), Catty-Cornered (1966)
283	48	"Snakes Alive! It's St. Patrick's Day!"	March 17, 2022
Toony and Bill get a special visit from everyone's favorite Leprechaun in honor of St. Patrick's Day. Featured cartoons: Droopy Leprechaun (1958), Shamrock and Roll (1969), Pink Punch (1966), Sacre Bleu Cross (1967), The Wearing of the Grin (1951)
284	49	"Fantastic Friday #24"	March 18, 2022
It's another "Fan-Tastic Friday", as Bill, Toony and the gang show cartoons with Bugs Bunny, Yosemite Sam and Tweety and Sylvester. Featured cartoons: See Ya Later Gladiator (1968), Bunker Hill Bunny (1950), Busy Buddies (1956), Sicque! Sicque! Sicque! (1966), Bad Ol' Putty Tat (1949)
285	50	"Actual Humans!"	March 21, 2022
A TV host by the name of Jump Jefferson showcases some of the most unique characters on Toon In with Me, with Bill standing out as one of the oddest. Featured cartoons: The Great Piggy Bank Robbery (1946), Hello How Am I (1939), Cherche le Phantom (1968), Hobby Horse-Laffs (1942), Robot Rabbit (1953)
286	51	"Bill's Legs Leave His Body"	March 22, 2022
Bill is in for a surprise when his legs take a vacation and begin to realize their true potential. Featured cartoons: The Pest That Came to Dinner (1948), The Fox and the Grapes (1941), Le Cop on Le Rocks (1967), Purr-Chance to Dream (1967), Hare Conditioned (1945)
287	52	"Bill Opens the Sunroof"	March 23, 2022
Bill and Toony open the studio sunroof. Featured cartoons: Hare Lift (1952), Ah, Sweet Mouse-Story of Life (1965), Pink of the Litter (1967), Hop and Go (1943), Lighter Than Hare (1960); Note: Hop and Go was shown restored, but with both the mono and stereo audio tracks playing at once, and the final shot being an extreme close-up of Claude Hopper.
288	53	"The Hat-Tastrophe"	March 24, 2022
Bill decides to change up his look -- in particular, his style of hat -- but Toony believes it's a bad idea. Featured cartoons: Bugs' Bonnets (1956), One Froggy Evening (1955), I Haven't Got a Hat (1935), Touché, Pussy Cat! (1954), A Bird in a Bonnet (1958)
289	54	"Fantastic Friday #25"	March 25, 2022
Bill and Toony celebrate the viewers of Toon In with Me in an all-new "Fan-Tastic Friday". Featured cartoons: Trip for Tat (1960), Bomb Voyage (1967), Hop, Skip and a Chump (1942), The Little Goldfish (1939), Rabbit Hood (1949)
290	55	"The Case of the Missing Sausages"	March 28, 2022
The Chicago detectives join Bill and Toony investigating "The Case of the Missing Sausages". Featured cartoons: Shishkabugs (1962), Barbecue Brawl (1956), Spree Lunch (1957), Canned Feud (1951), The Wise Quacking Duck (1943)
291	56	"Me-Man"	March 29, 2022
Sue P. introduces Bill and Toony to the new robotic MeTV personal assistant, the Me-Man. Featured cartoons: Foxy by Proxy (1952), Lickety-Splat (1961), House Hunting Mice (1947), Pierre and Cottage Cheese (1969), Daffy Rents (1966)
292	57	"Catfished"	March 30, 2022
Toony introduces Bill to his penpal, who isn't exactly who they say they are. Featured cartoons: Broom-Stick Bunny (1956), Fin'n Catty (1943), Females Is Fickle (1940), Cat Fishin' (1947), Pink Pest Control (1969)
293	58	"Sventoonie is Out of This World"	March 31, 2022
Bill, Toony and the gang open the sunroof. Featured cartoons: Beep Prepared (1961), Martian Through Georgia (1962), Advance and Be Mechanized (1967), Superior Duck (1996), Hare-Way to the Stars (1958)
294	59	"Fantastic Friday #26"	April 1, 2022
In another "Fan-Tastic Friday", Bill and Toony take requests and answer mail from viewers. Featured cartoons: Hare-um Scare-um (1939), A Haul in One (1956), Rock-a-Bye Bear (1952), We Did It (1936), Quackodile Tears (1962)
295	60	"Judge Toony"	April 5, 2022
Toony plays mediator for Bill and ends up getting a spinoff show where he solves all the problems of the Toon In with Me cast. Featured cartoons: The Fair-Haired Hare (1951), Assault and Flattery (1956), The Pink Pill (1968), Judge for a Day (1935), Hook, Line and Stinker (1958)
296	61	"Stuff & Nonsense #18"	April 6, 2022
The gang watches a new movie with Misty Drizzle and get a visit from hairstylist Pa-lice. Featured cartoons: Hare Trimmed (1953), Southbound Duckling (1955), Dog, Cat, and Canary (1945), The Bird Came C.O.D. (1942), Stooge for a Mouse (1950)
297	62	"Samnocchio"	April 7, 2022
Sockeye Sam goes on a grand adventure -- to Alaska. Featured cartoons: A Kiddies Kitty (1955), Now That Summer Is Gone (1938), The Little Wise Quacker (1952), The Aristo-Cat (1943), Weasel While You Work (1958)
298	63	"Fantastic Friday #27"	April 8, 2022
It's another "Fan-Tastic Friday". Featured cartoons: The Wacky Wabbit (1942), Twinkle, Twinkle, Little Pink (1968), Porky's Snooze Reel (1941), Shape Ahoy (1945), A Star Is Bored (1956)
299	64	"Barber of Our Bill"	April 11, 2022
Bill and the gang join a barbershop quartet. Featured cartoons: The Unruly Hare (1945), The Shell Shocked Egg (1948), Olive Oyl for President (1948), The Cat Above and the Mouse Below (1964), Rabbit of Seville (1950)
300	65	"Fashion!"	April 12, 2022
Claiming to be a fashion icon, Toony prepares Bill for a red carpet event. Featured cartoons: Long-Haired Hare (1949), Royal Cat Nap (1958), More Pep (1936), A Bird in a Guilty Cage (1952), Duck Amuck (1953)
301	66	"Easter Basket Cases"	April 14, 2022
It's time to celebrate Easter at the "Toon In with Me" studio. Bill's parents hide baskets for everyone to find, but someone else gets to them first. Featured cartoons: Happy Go Ducky (1958), Pop Goes Your Heart (1934), Mother Was a Rooster (1962), Pink, Plunk, Plink (1966), Easter Yeggs (1947)
302	67	"Fantastic Friday #28"	April 15, 2022
Bill and the gang celebrate "Fan-Tastic Friday", with viewer request and more. Featured cartoons: The EGGcited Rooster (1952), Greetings Bait (1943), The Deadwood Thunderball (1969), Adventures of Popeye (1935), High Diving Hare (1949)
303	68	"Fame Has Its Parks"	April 19, 2022
Toony hires a Bill the Cartoon Curator mascot to greet fans at a new "Toon In with Me" theme park. Featured cartoons: Cruise Cat (1952), The Foul Kin (1970), Gopher Broke (1958), Customers Wanted (1939), Hip Hip-Hurry! (1958)
304	69	"Remember That Date in '68?"	April 20, 2022
Bill travels back to the year 1968 to return a library book but keeps getting distracted along the way. Featured cartoons: The Duxorcist (1987), O-Solar Meow (1967), Hippydrome Tiger (1968), Betty Boop and the Little King (1936), Bugs and Thugs (1954)
305	70	"Yee Howdy Toys Around"	April 21, 2022
Bill and Toony revisit another episode of "Yee Howdy". Featured cartoons: Backwoods Bunny (1959), Tall in the Trap (1962), Little Beaux Pink (1968), An Egg Scramble (1950), Cock-a-Doodle-Duel (2004)
306	71	"Fantastic Friday #29"	April 22, 2022
In another "Fan-Tastic Friday", Bill and Toony take requests and answer mail from viewers. Featured cartoons: To Itch His Own (1958), Timid Tabby (1957), I Love to Singa (1936), Napoleon Blown-Aparte (1966), Duck Dodgers in the 24½th Century (1953)
307	72	"More News at 7"	April 25, 2022
Bill and Toony step in to save the day when the local news team experiences some bad luck. Featured cartoons: Baby Buggy Bunny (1954), Give and Tyke (1957), Symphony in Spinach (1948), Nutty News (1942), Pink-Outs (1967)
308	73	"What's Up, Spock?"	April 27, 2022
Bill and Toony are visited by aliens from another planet. Featured cartoons: Hold the Lion, Please (1942), Run, Run, Sweet Road Runner (1965), A Language All My Own (1935), Bartholomew Versus the Wheel (1964), Tot Watchers (1958)
309	74	"Stuff & Nonsense #19"	April 28, 2022
Tessa the PA frightens Bill and Toony, Flex Armswrong leads a glassware painting segment, and two cabaret singers perform a duet. Featured cartoons: Cats A-Weigh! (1953), A Little Soap and Water (1935), The Calico Dragon (1935), Chaser on the Rocks (1965), Apes of Wrath (1959)
310	75	"Fantastic Friday #30"	April 29, 2022
It's "Fan-Tastic Friday" at the "Toon In with Me" studio, where Bill & Toony celebrate the fans of the show and crown a new Super Tooner. Featured cartoons: Ready, Woolen and Able (1960), Hawks and Doves (1968), Fast Buck Duck (1963), Poor Cinderella (1934), Cat Feud (1958)
311	76	"Rabbit Rivals - Famous Feuds #1"	May 2, 2022
Bill, Toony and the gang start "Famous Feuds" week with a show featuring five of Bugs Bunny's most notable rivals. Plus, Simon Shock gets caught up in "Shock Jock Wars". Featured cartoons: Duck! Rabbit, Duck! (1953), Bewitched Bunny (1954), Bill of Hare (1962), Rabbit's Feat (1960), The Big Snooze (1946)
312	77	"Oh, That Cat and Mouse! - Famous Feuds #2"	May 3, 2022
Famous Feuds week continues with a look at the rivalry between Tom Cat and Jerry Mouse. Featured cartoons: Cue Ball Cat (1950), The Million Dollar Cat (1944), Carmen Get It! (1962), Pent-House Mouse (1963), Johann Mouse (1953)
313	78	"Duck vs. The World - Famous Feuds #3"	May 4, 2022
Toon In with Me's celebration of Famous Feuds takes a look at the many characters who have faced off with Daffy Duck. Featured cartoons: Duck Soup to Nuts (1944), The Iceman Ducketh (1964), Ducking the Devil (1957), It's Nice to Have a Mouse Around the House (1965), Rabbit Fire (1951)
314	79	"F•R•E•N•E•M•I•E•S - Famous Feuds #4"	May 5, 2022
Bill and Toony continue "Famous Feuds" week by encountering some enemies who become friends. Featured cartoons: Tweet and Sour (1956), Blue Cat Blues (1956), It's the Natural Thing to Do (1939), A Sheep in the Deep (1962), The Million Hare (1963)
315	80	"Little Guys vs. Big Guys - Famous Feuds #5"	May 6, 2022
Famous Feuds week comes to an end with a look at some classic little guy verse big guy rivalries. Featured cartoons: The Jet Cage (1962), Daredevil Droopy (1951), Walky Talky Hawky (1946), Bridge Ahoy (1936), Hair-Raising Hare (1946)
316	81	"Toony the Tuna, M.D."	May 9, 2022
Toony put his medical TV show knowledge to use and cures some of the Toon In with Me cast of their ailments. Featured cartoons: The Duck Doctor (1952), For Better or Nurse (1945), Patient Porky (1940), Le Quiet Squad (1967), Operation: Rabbit (1952)
317	82	"Tribute to Tex & Texas"	May 10, 2022
Bill and Toony pay tribute to Tex Avery and his home state of Texas with an all-Tex Avery cartoon lineup, including the very first cartoon starring Daffy Duck. Featured cartoons: The Heckling Hare (1941), Porky's Duck Hunt (1937), Billy Boy (1954), Car of Tomorrow (1951), The First Bad Man (1955)
318	83	"Undercover Goldie"	May 11, 2022
Goldie Fisher goes undercover as other Toon In with Me characters in order to spy on the operations of the show. Featured cartoons: Rabbit Seasoning (1952), Vim, Vigor and Vitaliky (1936), Double or Mutton (1955), Cock-a-Doodle Deux-Deux (1966), Paying the Piper (1949)
319	84	"America's Top Dummy"	May 12, 2022
Toony persuades Bill to compete in the hottest new reality TV show, but it's not until they're on-air that Bill realizes what's really going on. Featured cartoons: Bedevilled Rabbit (1957), The Impossible Possum (1954), Nix on Hypnotricks (1941), A Bone for a Bone (1951), Good Noose (1962)
320	85	"Fantastic Friday #31"	May 13, 2022
It's another "Fan-Tastic Friday", where Bill and Toony answer requests and hear from viewers like you. Featured cartoons: The High and the Flighty (1956), Flying Feet (1969), What's My Lion? (1961), Be Kind to 'Aminals' (1935), Horton Hatches the Egg (1942)
321	86	"Toony the Wedding Planner"	May 16, 2022
Toony is put in charge of Bill's parents' wedding vow renewal ceremony, but things quickly spiral out of control. Featured cartoons: Banty Raids (1963), Bride and Gloom (1954), Merry Mannequins (1937), A Taste of Money (1970), Devil May Hare (1954)
322	87	"Stuff & Nonsense #20"	May 17, 2022
Bill gets pranked on social media, Toony gets a pick-me-up from Pop Quizzer, and Benny the IT Feller gets a book deal. Featured cartoons: The Grey Hounded Hare (1949), Rabbit Stew and Rabbits Too! (1969), Hold the Wire (1936), Little Johnny Jet (1953), The Missing Mouse (1953)
323	88	"Wackadoodle Wednesday"	May 18, 2022
Bill and Toony try out a new episode concept called Wackadoodle Wednesday, but things don't go as planned. Featured cartoons: Quack Shot (1954), Deputy Droopy (1955), Notes to You (1941), Much Ado About Mousing (1964), Ready, Set, Zoom! (1955)
324	89	"Toony & the Quiet Storm"	May 19, 2022
After getting bonked on the head with a light fixture, Toony becomes a R&B singing sensation. Featured cartoons: Solid Serenade (1946), Back Alley Oproar (1948), Little Rural Riding Hood (1949), Brotherly Love (1936), Swooner Crooner (1944)
325	90	"Fantastic Friday #32"	May 20, 2022
It's "Fan-Tastic Friday" so the gang is answering questions, taking requests, and getting a peak at some of Bill's collectibles from a sci-fi classic. Featured cartoons: Catty Cornered (1953), Pink is a Many Splintered Thing (1968), Easy Peckin's (1953), Goonland (1938), Water, Water Every Hare (1952)
326	91	"Bill Gets Wound-Up"	May 23, 2022
In today's episode, Bill gets all wound-up. Featured cartoons: The Solid Tin Coyote (1966), Toy Trouble (1941), Les Miserobots (1968), Mouse Trouble (1944), The Stupor Salesman (1948)
327	92	"Backstage with Tessa the P.A."	May 24, 2022
A documentary film crew follows around Tessa the PA, and Toony, of course, is jealous. Featured cartoons: Tree Cornered Tweety (1956), Fair and Worm-er (1946), The Impractical Joker (1937), Two's a Crowd (1950), Dime to Retire (1955)
328	93	"Greatest Generation"	May 25, 2022
Bill and Toony show cartoons with World War II references and visit characters from "The Greatest Generation". Featured cartoons: Super-Rabbit (1943), Draftee Daffy (1945), Gas (1944), Barney Bear's Victory Garden (1942), Mess Production (1945)
329	94	"The Paper Airplane Contest"	May 26, 2022
Bill and Toony are competing in the Tuna Troopers' paper airplane competition, but can't seem to find anyone in the studio who can make an aircraft. Featured cartoons: Crockett-Doodle-Do (1960), Country Boy (1935), Strong to the Finich (1934), Lucky Pink (1968), To Hare is Human (1956)
330	95	"Weirdy Weekday: The Sequel"	May 31, 2022
Tinsel the Wizard casts a body-switching spell on Bill, Toony and the rest of the Toon In with Me characters. Featured cartoons: Golden Yeggs (1950), Rocket-Bye Baby (1956), Stealin' Aint Honest (1940), Slink Pink (1969), Hyde and Hare (1955)
331	96	"Goldie Goes To Mars"	June 1, 2022
Goldie Fisher travels to Mars. And Bill and Toony show great cartoons with space themes, including the first appearance of Marvin the Martian. Featured cartoons: Haredevil Hare (1948), Jumpin' Jupiter (1955), Rocket to Mars (1946), Rocket Squad (1956), The Cat That Hated People (1948)
332	97	"Wrestling World"	June 2, 2022
Bill defends his Traveling Wrestling Show title against Sue P. and the Sham Rock. Featured cartoons: Bunny Hugged (1951), Pup on a Picnic (1955), Let's You and Him Fight (1934), Mouse and Garden (1960), Along Came Daffy (1947)
333	98	"Fantastic Friday #33"	June 3, 2022
It's another "Fan-Tastic Friday" where Bill and Toony answer mail from viewers. Featured cartoons: Aqua Duck (1963), Fox Pop (1942), Aviation Vacation (1941), Beware of Barnacle Bill (1935), Trap Happy Porky (1945)
334	99	"It's National VCR Day!"	June 7, 2022
Bill and Toony celebrate National VCR Day. Featured cartoons: Smarty Cat (1955), Cool Cat (1967), Booby Hatched (1944), Hot-Rod and Reel! (1959), All Fowled Up (1955)
335	100	"Bill of Wrongs"	June 8, 2022
Bill gets a call from a wrong number and decides to help the person on the other end of the call with their list of things to do. Featured cartoons: Just Plane Beep (1965), Mouse Menace (1946), The Girl at the Ironing Board (1934), Half-Pint Palomino (1953), False Hare (1964)
336	101	"Tic Tac Toony #3"	June 9, 2022
Toon In with Me celebrities join Bill and Toony for another game of "Tic Tac Toony". Featured cartoons: Knighty Knight Bugs (1958), Zip Zip Hooray (1965), Down and Outing (1961), Pinknic (1967), Hush My Mouse (1946)
337	102	"Fantastic Friday #34"	June 10, 2022
Bill and Toony celebrate another "Fan-Tastic Friday", answering questions from viewers and showing rarely seen cartoons with Tom and Jerry, Daffy Duck and Popeye. Featured cartoons: The Unexpected Pest (1956), The Penguin Parade (1938), Dicky Moe (1962), I-Ski Love-Ski You-Ski (1936), The Night of the Living Duck (1988)
338	103	"Taking a Dive Into '55"	June 13, 2022
Bill's clicker malfunctions, zapping him back to the year 1955. Cartoons feature classics from the year 1955. Featured cartoons: Stork Naked (1955), Mouse for Sale (1955), Red Riding Hoodwinked (1955), Cellbound (1955), This Is a Life? (1955)
339	104	"Dial "D" for Donuts"	June 15, 2022
Toony finds a Hitchcockian movie that Bill made when he was a kid. Featured cartoons: The Last Hungry Cat (1961), Pink-A-Boo (1966), Cobs and Robbers (1953), The Fly's Last Flight (1949), Zoom at the Top (1962)
340	105	"Good-Bye Cap'n Bill"	June 16, 2022
Bill shows the last episode ever of his favorite cartoon show as a kid: "Cap'n Bill and His Sea Pals". Featured cartoons: People Are Bunny (1959), A Tale of Two Kitties (1942), Pitchin' Woo at the Zoo (1944), Symphony in Slang (1951), To Duck or Not to Duck (1943)
341	106	"Fantastic Friday #35"	June 17, 2022
In another "Fan-Tastic Friday", Bill and Toony take requests and answer mail from viewers. Featured cartoons: Prince Violent (1961), Wild Honey, or, How to Get Along Without a Ration Book (1942), Caballero Droopy (1952), Pip-eye, Pup-eye, Poop-eye an' Peep-eye (1942), Boulder Wham! (1965)
342	107	"Doughnuthole Run II"	June 20, 2022
Bill, Toony and the gang do a takeoff on the movie "Cannonball Run". Featured cartoons: The Hare-Brained Hypnotist (1942), Hatch Up Your Troubles (1949), Pinkadilly Circus (1968), Olive's $weep$take Ticket (1941), The Dixie Fryer (1960)
343	108	"Garage Sale Blues"	June 21, 2022
Bill's Parents sell a box of Bill's collectibles at their garage sale by mistake. Featured cartoons: Rhapsody Rabbit (1946), Put-Put Pink (1968), Choose Your 'Weppins' (1935), Tree for Two (1952), Down Beat Bear (1956)
344	109	"Are You Aware of the Accordion?"	June 23, 2022
Bill and Toony celebrate National Accordion Awareness Month. Featured cartoons: Knights Must Fall (1949), Tom-ic Energy (1965), Porky's Pet (1936), Quentin Quail (1946), To Beep or Not to Beep (1963)
345	110	"Goldie's Farewell"	June 24, 2022
Bill and Toony say goodbye to Goldie Fisher. Featured cartoons: False Hare (1964), Spooky Swabs (1957), Chariots of Fur (1994), Hawaiian Aye Aye (1964); Note: This episode is Leila Goldstein's final episode as a cast member.
346	111	"Supermania"	June 27, 2022
Bill and Toony do a tribute show to Superman, with Superman parody cartoons from Bugs Bunny, Popeye and the Pink Panther, along with a rarely seen Max Fleischer Superman cartoon, "The Arctic Giant". Featured cartoons: Stupor Duck (1956), Super Pink (1966), She-Sick Sailors (1944), Fast and Furry-ous (1949), The Arctic Giant (1942)
347	112	"Mice!"	June 28, 2022
Bill and Toony hang out with a new pal, Miles the Mouse, and watch six cartoons -- all of them featuring mice. Featured cartoons: The Dog House (1952), Merlin the Magic Mouse (1967), Rodent to Stardom (1967), Mice Follies (1960), Little Brother Rat (1939), Mouse Wreckers (1949)
348	113	"Late Night with Toony"	June 29, 2022
Toony gets his own late-night talk show, with a little help from his friends. Featured cartoons: Person to Bunny (1960), Cookin' with Gags (1955), Dough Ray Me-ow (1948), A Ham in a Role (1949), The Hollywood Bowl (1950)
349	114	"What's Up, Dog?"	June 30, 2022
Toony adopts a dog and Bill shows an all-dog cartoon lineup, featuring Bugs Bunny, Tweety and Sylvester and the Chuck Jones cult classic, "Fresh Airedale". Featured cartoons: Hare Ribbin' (1944), Garden Gopher (1950), Dog Tales (1958), Dog Pounded (1954), Popeye Presents Eugene the Jeep (1940), Fresh Airedale (1945)
350	115	"A Day at the Circus"	July 4, 2022
Bill and Toony celebrate the circus and show circus-themed cartoons featuring Bugs Bunny, Sylvester the Cat and Popeye. Featured cartoons: Tweety's Circus (1955), The Man on the Flying Trapeze (1934), Circus Today (1940), The Flea Circus (1954), Acrobatty Bunny (1946)
351	116	"Cartoon Magic"	July 5, 2022
Bill and Toony try some magic tricks while presenting a showcase of six magic-themed cartoons. Featured cartoons: Whizzard of Ow (2003), Bully for Pink (1965), The Bird Came C.O.D. (1942), Feud With a Dude (1968), The Hyp-Nut-Tist (1935), The Hare-Brained Hypnotist (1942)
352	117	"In the Background"	July 7, 2022
Bill and Toony celebrate the background and layout designers that worked on classic cartoons during the golden age of animation. Featured cartoons: Claws for Alarm (1954), The Slick Chick (1962), King-Size Canary (1947), Much Ado About Nutting (1953), Baseball Bugs (1946)
353	118	"Fantastic Friday #36"	July 8, 2022
Bill and Toony celebrate another "Fan-Tastic Friday", where they answer questions and requests from viewers. Featured cartoons: Honey's Money (1962), Dog Tired (1942), The Prospecting Bear (1941), The Twisker Pitcher (1937), The Abominable Snow Rabbit (1961)
354	119	"Detective Daffy"	July 11, 2022
Toony and Bill count down their favorite, classic Looney Tunes featuring Daffy Duck as a detective. Featured cartoons: The Super Snooper (1952), Deduce, You Say! (1956), Daffy Dilly (1948), Corn on the Cop (1965), Boston Quackie (1957), The Great Piggy Bank Robbery (1946)
355	120	"A Word from Our Sponsor"	July 12, 2022
Bill and Toony show vintage TV commercials, and also show classic cartoons, including Tex Avery's take on early TV. Featured cartoons: Daffy Doodles (1946), Billboard Frolics (1935), Parlez Vous Woo (1956), T.V. of Tomorrow (1953), Road Runner a Go-Go (1965)
356	121	"Beachy Keen"	July 13, 2022
Bill and Toony each pick their three favorite beach-themed cartoons. Featured cartoons: Salt Water Tabby (1947), Sandy Claws (1955), Tour de Farce (1967), Come on In! The Water's Pink! (1968), Muscle Tussle (1953), Muscle Beach Tom (1956)
357	122	"What's in the Box... of Wigs?"	July 14, 2022
Bill and Toony discover a box full of haunted wigs. Featured cartoons: Sugar and Spies (1966), Who Killed Who? (1943), A Tale of Two Mice (1945), Cops Is Always Right (1938), Cannery Rodent (1967)
358	123	"Fantastic Friday #37"	July 15, 2022
It's "Fan-Tastic Friday" once again. Featured cartoons: Bell Hoppy (1954), Sweet And Sourdough (1969), Mutts About Racing (1958), Child Psykolojiky (1941), Case of the Missing Hare (1942)
359	124	"Picnic Cage"	July 19, 2022
Bill and Toony show some picnic-themed cartoons. Featured cartoons: Pup On a Picnic (1955), Ant Pasted (1953), Pinknic (1967), The Gay Anties (1947), The Foxy Pup (1937), Barney's Hungry Cousin (1953)
360	125	"Postcards from the Ends of the Earth"	July 20, 2022
Bill and Toony sort through Toony's big pile of unopened mail. Featured cartoons: Hairied and Hurried (1965), High Note (1960), The Pink Package Plot (1968), Cheese It, the Cat! (1957), Goo Goo Goliath (1954), Ain't She Tweet (1952)
361	126	"Pump You Up"	July 21, 2022
Bill picks out his favorite cartoons featuring physical fitness, including the last cartoon with Bugs and Cecil Turtle. Plus, Flex Armswrong offers health tips to viewers. Featured cartoons: Rabbit Transit (1947), Pettin' In The Park (1934), The Chump Champ (1950), Never Kick a Woman (1936), I Got Plenty of Mutton (1944)
362	127	"Fantastic Friday #38"	July 22, 2022
Bill and Toony take viewer requests (including a lesser-known Harman-Ising cartoon) and Bill recalls his past experience on MeTV's Collector's Call. Featured cartoons: Dr. Devil and Mr. Hare (1964), Nearlyweds (1957), Poor Little Me (1935), Mice Follies (1954), The Unmentionables (1963)
363	128	"Bugs Firsts"	July 25, 2022
Bill and Toony kick off Bugs Bunny's Birthday Bash with cartoons that feature a first for the rabbit. Featured cartoons: A Wild Hare (1940), Operation: Rabbit (1952), Devil May Hare (1954), Rabbit Fire (1951), Box-Office Bunny (1991)
364	129	"Bugs & Sports"	July 26, 2022
Bill and Toony continue Bugs Bunny's Birthday Bash with a look at the rabbit's entries into the field of sports. Featured cartoons: Baseball Bugs (1946), Rabbit Punch (1948), The Grey Hounded Hare (1949), Piker's Peak (1957), Bully for Bugs (1953)
365	130	"Global Bugs"	July 28, 2022
Bill and Toony continue Bugs Bunny's Birthday Bash with a look at the rabbit's travels around the world. Featured cartoons: French Rarebit (1951), Sahara Hare (1955), Hare We Go (1951), Bonanza Bunny (1959), Ali Baba Bunny (1957)
366	131	"Fairy Tale Bugs"	July 29, 2022
Bill and Toony conclude Bugs Bunny's Birthday Bash with a look at the rabbit's forays into the world of fairy tales. Featured cartoons: Bugs Bunny and the Three Bears (1944), Little Red Riding Rabbit (1944), The Windblown Hare (1949), Bewitched Bunny (1954), Beanstalk Bunny (1955)
367	132	"Party to the Max"	August 2, 2022
Bill and Toony celebrate animation legend Max Fleischer. Featured cartoons: Popeye the Sailor Meets Sindbad the Sailor (1936), Poor Cinderella (1934), Let's Sing with Popeye (1934), The Mechanical Monsters (1941)
368	133	"Helpful Hints"	August 3, 2022
Bill and Toony receive helpful hints from some of their friends. Featured cartoons: Putty Tat Trouble (1951), Bear Raid Warden (1944), The Lion's Busy (1950), Smile Pretty Say Pink (1966), A Fractured Leghorn (1950)
369	134	"Tunnel Vision!"	August 4, 2022
Bill and Toony get tunnel vision. Featured cartoons: Transylvania 6-5000 (1963), A Bone for a Bone (1951), Insect to Injury (1956), One Meat Brawl (1947), Landing Stripling (1962), Shot and Bothered (1966)
370	135	"Fantastic Friday #39"	August 5, 2022
Bill and Toony celebrate another "Fan-Tastic Friday", answering questions from viewers. Featured cartoons: Room and Bird (1951), Cirrhosis of the Louvre (1966), The Jeep (1938), Smile, Darn Ya, Smile! (1931), Attack of the Drones (2004)
371	136	"Before They Were Stars"	August 8, 2022
Bill and Toony revisit the debut appearances of some of the show's wacky characters and showcase the debuts of various cartoon characters. Featured cartoons: Elmer's Candid Camera (1940), I Haven't Got a Hat (1935), Walky Talky Hawky (1946), The Pink Phink (1964), Don't Give Up the Sheep (1953)
372	137	"Bedtime Stories"	August 9, 2022
Toony tries to take a nap while Bill presents six bedtime-themed cartoons. Featured cartoons: Little Red Rodent Hood (1952), Good Night Elmer (1940), Rock-a-Bye Pinky (1966), With Poopdeck Pappy (1940), Purr-Chance to Dream (1967), His Hare-Raising Tale (1951)
373	138	"Californianimation"	August 10, 2022
Bill and Toony show cartoons that involve the state of California. Featured cartoons: Hollywood Daffy (1946), Cross Country Detours (1940), Gold Rush Daze (1939), Pinto Pink (1967), What's Up, Doc? (1950)
374	139	"Fantastic Friday #40"	August 12, 2022
The 40th "Fan-Tastic Friday" episode. Featured cartoons: The Wise Quacking Duck (1943), By Word of Mouse (1954), The Little Mole (1941), Swat the Fly (1935), Falling Hare (1943)
375	140	"Ain't It Punny"	August 15, 2022
Bill and Toony have a pun-off. Featured cartoons: Bill of Hare (1962), Give and Tyke (1957), Pest Pilot (1941), Crowing Pains (1947), Pinkcome Tax (1968), Good Noose (1962)
376	141	"Friz!"	August 17, 2022
Bill and Toony showcase 5 classic cartoons directed by Friz Freleng. Featured cartoons: Captain Hareblower (1954), Pigs in a Polka (1943), Pickled Pink (1965), You Ought to Be in Pictures (1940), Tweetie Pie (1947)
377	142	"Fantastic Friday #41"	August 19, 2022
In another "Fan-Tastic Friday", Bill and Toony take requests and answer mail from viewers. Classic cartoons feature Bugs Bunny, Daffy Duck and Tom & Jerry. Featured cartoons: Ain't That Ducky (1945), French Freud (1969), Buddies Thicker Than Water (1962), Holiday for Shoestrings (1946), Rabbit's Kin (1952)
378	143	"Hold On"	August 23, 2022
Toony and Bill get stuck on hold. Featured cartoons: Bugs and Thugs (1954), The Eager Beaver (1946), Hold the Wire (1936), The Pest That Came to Dinner (1948), Grape Nutty (1949), Busy Buddies (1956)
379	144	"Still British Toon in with Me"	August 24, 2022
A British version of Toon In with Me, with cartoons set in England. Featured cartoons: Rabbit Hood (1949), Dr. Jerkyl's Hide (1954), London Derriere (1968), Out-Foxed (1949), Shishkabugs (1962)
380	145	"Knight Life"	August 25, 2022
Bill shows off some gear he bought at a Renaissance fair. Featured cartoons: Knight-mare Hare (1955), Robin Hoodwinked (1958), Pink Valiant (1968), I Was a Teenage Thumb (1963), One Droopy Knight (1957), Robin Hood Daffy (1958)
381	146	"Fantastic Friday #42"	August 26, 2022
It's another "Fan-Tastic Friday". Featured cartoons: Fish and Slips (1962), Symphony in Slang (1951), Porky and Gabby (1937), Shocking Pink (1965), Carrotblanca (1995)
382	147	"The Clampett Carnival"	August 29, 2022
Bill and Toony celebrate the work of the great Looney Tunes director, Bob Clampett. Featured cartoons: Wabbit Twouble (1941), Porky & Daffy (1938), Birdy and the Beast (1944), Book Revue (1946), A Corny Concerto (1943)
383	148	"I Spy"	August 30, 2022
Bill and Toony meet an unusual character named Dr. Eye Spy. Featured cartoons: Boston Quackie (1957), The Mouse from H.U.N.G.E.R. (1967), Private Eye Popeye (1954), Pinkfinger (1965), A Pair of Sneakers (1969), Sugar and Spies (1966)
384	149	"Happy Birthday Foghorn"	August 31, 2022
Bill and Toony celebrate Foghorn Leghorn's birthday by showcasing classic cartoons featuring the southern rooster. Featured cartoons: The Foghorn Leghorn (1948), Strangled Eggs (1961), Superior Duck (1996), Henpecked Hoboes (1946), Plop Goes the Weasel (1953)
385	150	"Working for a Living"	September 1, 2022
Bill and Toony commemorate Labor Day by showing cartoons about working; a visit from MeTV's big boss. Featured cartoons: Hare Conditioned (1945), Woolen Under Where (1963), Prefabricated Pink (1967), A Haul in One (1956), Betty Boop's Crazy Inventions (1933), Daffy's Inn Trouble (1961)
386	151	"Fantastic Friday #43"	September 2, 2022
Bill and Toony celebrate another "Fan-Tastic Friday". Featured cartoons: Yankee Doodle Daffy (1943), The Invisible Mouse (1947), A Star is Hatched (1938), Coo-Coo Bird Dog (1949), Hare Trigger (1945)
387	152	"Bill's Dad Moves In"	September 6, 2022
Bill's dad moves into the studio. Featured cartoons: Birth of a Notion (1947), Pests for Guests (1955), The Sneezing Weasel (1938), Say Cheese, Please (1970), Hare Force (1944)
388	153	"Toony Hits the Jackpot"	September 7, 2022
Toony plays the lottery and wins. Featured cartoons: Barbary Coast Bunny (1956), Wags to Riches (1949), Heir Bear (1953), A Taste of Money (1970), The Million Dollar Cat (1944), Fast Buck Duck (1963)
389	154	"Mr. Quizzer Gets Rich"	September 8, 2022
Bill assumes something is amiss when Mr. Quizzer becomes filthy rich. Featured cartoons: Heir-Conditioned (1955), Fox-Terror (1957), Pink Sphinx (1968), Taking the Blame (1935), Big House Bunny (1950)
390	155	"Fantastic Friday #44"	September 9, 2022
Bill and Toony celebrate another "Fan-Tastic Friday". Featured cartoons: The Little Orphan (1949), Her Honor the Mare (1943), The Bashful Buzzard (1945), I Only Have Eyes for You (1937), Pantry Panic (1941)
391	156	"The Mystery of History (in Cartoons)"	September 12, 2022
Bill and Toony watch cartoons set in various historical time periods. Featured cartoons: Roman Legion-Hare (1955), It's Greek to Me-ow! (1961), Those Were Wonderful Days (1934), Popeye Meets Hercules (1948), Prehistoric Pink (1968), A Witch's Tangled Hare (1959)
392	157	"The Silent Treatment"	September 13, 2022
Toony gets a movie deal, but needs help from Bill and a voice coach to seal the deal. Featured cartoons: Invasion of the Bunny Snatchers (1992), Birds of a Father (1961), Quiet Pleeze! (1941), To Itch His Own (1958), Pink Pajamas (1964)
393	158	"Ants On a Log Day"	September 14, 2022
Bill and Toony celebrate their favorite September 14th holidays, with help from their friends. Featured cartoons: The Iceman Ducketh (1964), Pink Pest Control (1969), Me Musical Nephews (1942), The Gay Anties (1947), Sheep Ahoy (1954), Weasel Stop (1956)
394	159	"Bill Enters a Pageant"	September 15, 2022
Bill enters the Mr. Illinois Funny Buddy pageant. Featured cartoons: Crockett-Doodle-Do (1960), Slick Hare (1947), Lickety-Splat (1961), Pink Posies (1967), Little School Mouse (1954)
395	160	"Fantastic Friday #45"	September 16, 2022
Bill and Toony take requests and answer mail from viewers. Featured cartoons: Rabbitson Crusoe (1956), 3 Ring Wing-Ding (1968), Moonlight for Two (1932), Ain't We Got Fun (1937), Tweet Tweet Tweety (1951)
396	161	"Special Skillz"	September 19, 2022
Toony helps Bill fill out the "Special Skills" section of his acting resume. Featured cartoons: Big Top Bunny (1951), Moby Duck (1965), The House Builder-Upper (1938), We Give Pink Stamps (1965), Daredevil Droopy (1951), Beep Prepared (1961)
397	162	"Sylvester"	September 20, 2022
Bill and Toony feature an all-Sylvester cartoon line-up. Featured cartoons: Life with Feathers (1945), Kitty Kornered (1946), Scaredy Cat (1948), Mouse Mazurka (1949), Birds Anonymous (1957)
398	163	"I ReMemoir It Well"	September 21, 2022
Toony attempts to write a memoir, and enlists Bill to be his fact-checker. Featured cartoons: Mouse Trouble (1944), The Hot Air Salesman (1937), A Gander at Mother Goose (1940), The Foxy Duckling (1947), Two Gophers from Texas (1948), Cat's Paw (1959)
399	164	"Fantastic Friday #46"	September 23, 2022
In another "Fan-Tastic Friday", Bill and Toony take requests and answer mail from viewers. Featured cartoons: A Star Is Bored (1956), Martian Through Georgia (1962), Fistic Mystic (1969), The Film Fan (1939), Touché, Pussy Cat! (1954)
400	165	"Toony Is a Little Horse"	September 27, 2022
Toony loses his voice and Bill has trouble understanding how he can help out. Featured cartoons: Honey's Money (1962), A Bird in a Bonnet (1958), Be Kind to 'Aminals' (1935), Half-Pint Palomino (1953), Posse Cat (1954), Buckaroo Bugs (1944)
401	166	"Knock Knock Knick"	September 29, 2022
Bill and Toony receive a visit from internet sensation Knock Knock Knick. Featured cartoons: Who's Kitten Who? (1952), The House That Jack Built (1939), Rover's Rival (1937), Jet Pink (1967), Stop! Look! And Hasten! (1954)
402	167	"Fantastic Friday #47"	September 30, 2022
Bill and Toony celebrate "Fan-Tastic Friday" with cartoons. Featured cartoons: Fastest with the Mostest (1960), Puss n' Booty (1943), The Shooting of Dan McGoo (1945), Rock 'n' Rodent (1967), Organ Grinder's Swing (1937)
403	168	"Spooky Foley Artists"	October 3, 2022
Bill and Toony try creating the sounds heard in TV shows and movies just like Foley artists do. Featured cartoons: Devil May Hare (1954), Now Hear This (1963), Fish and Slips (1962), Dial "P" for Pink (1965), One Froggy Evening (1955), Zip Zip Hooray! (1965)
404	169	"Sweep Week"	October 4, 2022
Phil the Cartoon Custodian drops by to celebrate Sweep Week. Featured cartoons: Slicked-up Pup (1951), Design for Leaving (1954), House Hunting Mice (1947), Fiesta Fiasco (1967), To Hare Is Human (1956)
405	170	"Disappearing Things"	October 5, 2022
The studio disappears behind Bill and Toony. Featured cartoons: I Taw a Putty Tat (1948), The Hand Is Pinker Than The Eye (1967), Gopher Spinach (1954), The Vanishing Duck (1958), Clippety Clobbered (1966), Duck Amuck (1953)
406	171	"Mind Your Manners"	October 6, 2022
Bill and Toony take an etiquette class with classic cartoons featuring Bugs Bunny, Daffy Duck, and Elmer Fudd. Featured cartoons: French Rarebit (1951), Rabbit Stew and Rabbits Too (1969), We Aim to Please (1934), The Cagey Canary (1941), Don't Axe Me (1958)
407	172	"Fantastic Friday #48"	October 7, 2022
Bill and Toony take requests and answer mail from viewers in another edition of "Fan-Tastic Friday". Featured cartoons: Tick Tock Tuckered (1944), Lost and Foundling (1944), Leghorn Swoggled (1951), Hello How Am I (1939), Cat Napping (1951)
408	173	"Toony Angers a Monkey"	October 10, 2022
Toony lands himself in hot water when he upsets a coworker. Featured cartoons: Canary Row (1950), Chimp & Zee (1968), The Organ Grinder (1933), Punch Trunk (1953), My Friend the Monkey (1939), Apes of Wrath (1959)
409	174	"Tee or Tea Party"	October 12, 2022
Bill and Toony are not quite sure if they're having a tea or tee party. Featured cartoons: My Bunny Lies over the Sea (1948), Betty Boop and Grampy (1935), Tee for Two (1945), Mother Was a Rooster (1962), Tease for Two (1965), Backwoods Bunny (1959)
410	175	"NOStolgiaFERATOO"	October 13, 2022
Bill and Toony have a new and nostalgic friend on the show. Featured cartoons: Buccaneer Bunny (1948), Lighthouse Mouse (1955), Axe Me Another (1934), The Bee-Deviled Bruin (1949), Whizzard of Ow (2003)
411	176	"Fantastic Friday #49"	October 14, 2022
In another "Fan-Tastic Friday", Bill and Toony take requests and answer mail from viewers. Featured cartoons: Dumb Patrol (1964), Plenty Below Zero (1943), Professor Tom (1948), Sky Blue Pink (1968), What Makes Daffy Duck (1948)
412	177	"Bill Is Afraid of the Dark"	October 18, 2022
Bill shares something personal with Toony. Featured cartoons: Little Boy Boo (1954), Haunted Mouse (1965), Terrier Stricken (1952), Cherche Le Phantom (1968), Trick or Tweet (1959), Speedy Ghost to Town (1967)
413	178	"It's National Hagfish Day!"	October 19, 2022
It's National Hagfish Day, as well as National Friends Day which means Bill and Toony make a new friend. Featured cartoons: Jerry and Jumbo (1953), A Mouse Divided (1953), Feline Frame-Up (1954), Quackodile Tears (1962), I Gopher You (1954)
414	179	"Haunted Studio Tour"	October 20, 2022
Bill and Toony meet some tourists on their haunted studio tour. Featured cartoons: Duck Dodgers and the Return of the 24½th Century (1980), Ghosks is the Bunk (1939), Trip for Tat (1960), Plastered in Paris (1966), What's My Lion? (1961), Hare Lift (1952)
415	180	"Fantastic Friday #50"	October 21, 2022
It's "Fan-Tastic Friday", which means Bill and Toony requests and answer mail from viewers. Featured cartoons: Hopalong Casualty (1960), Dumb-Hounded (1943), Often an Orphan (1949), A Ham in a Role (1949), Bugs Bunny Gets the Boid (1942)
416	181	"Foot the Bill"	October 24, 2022
Bill gets a weird fan letter. Featured cartoons: Bowery Bugs (1949), Cat Feud (1958), La Feet's Defeat (1968), You Gotta Be a Football Hero (1935), Flying Feet (1969), Sock a Doodle Do (1952)
417	182	"Waiting for Gourd-O!"	October 26, 2022
Bill and Toony celebrate fall by watching seasonal cartoons, decorating the studio with gourds, and searching for the mysterious Gourd-O. Featured cartoons: Lumber Jerks (1955), Foxy by Proxy (1952), Now That Summer Is Gone (1938), Tickled Pink (1968), Rabbit Seasoning (1952)
418	183	"Sick, Dude!"	October 27, 2022
Toony is under the weather but finds a way to capitalize on his sickness. Featured cartoons: Little Red Riding Rabbit (1944), Patient Porky (1940), Big Bad Sindbad (1952), Shocking Pink (1965), Daffy Dilly (1948)
419	184	"Fantastic Friday #51"	October 28, 2022
In another "Fan-Tastic Friday", Bill and Toony take requests and answer mail from viewers. Featured cartoons: Sufferin' Cats! (1943), Suppressed Duck (1965), Why Do I Dream Those Dreams? (1934), Deputy Droopy (1955), Bugsy and Mugsy (1957)
420	185	"When Blob E. Met Bill E."	October 31, 2022
Bill and Toony celebrate Halloween with some special friends. Featured cartoons: Broom-Stick Bunny (1956), Pink Panic (1967), A-Haunting We Will Go (1966), Transylvania Mania (1968), Hair-Raising Hare (1946)
421	186	"This Episode Stinks"	November 1, 2022
Bill is awarded a college degree in cartoon smelling. Featured cartoons: Puss 'n' Boats (1966), Bugs Bunny and the Three Bears (1944), Zip 'N Snort (1961), Little 'Tinker (1948), A Little Soap and Water (1935), Odor of the Day (1948)
422	187	"Bill Gets Scandalous"	November 2, 2022
A misunderstanding turns Bill the Cartoon Curator into TV's latest bad boy. Featured cartoons: What's Cookin' Doc? (1944), Bats in the Belfry (1942), Going! Going! Gosh! (1952), Me Feelins is Hurt (1940), My Favorite Duck (1942)
423	188	"Watch Out!"	November 3, 2022
Bill replaces the battery in his watch, an act that sets in motion a time-traveling adventure. Featured cartoons: Ready, Woolen and Able (1960), Psychedelic Pink (1968), The Night Watchman (1938), See Ya Later Gladiator (1968), Hare-Way to the Stars (1958), Guided Mouse-ille (1967)
424	189	"Fantastic Friday #52"	November 4, 2022
Bill and Toony get some help from an unprepared Mr. Quizzer during the 52nd "Fan-Tastic Friday". Featured cartoons: Boulder Wham! (1965), Pip-eye, Pup-eye, Poop-eye an' Peep-eye (1942), Pink Ice (1965), Daffy's Diner (1967), Jerry and the Goldfish (1951)
425	190	"Lord of the Lies"	November 7, 2022
Bill and Toony have a discussion about common misconceptions caused by cartoons. Featured cartoons: 14 Carrot Rabbit (1952), Pet Peeve (1954), All Fowled Up (1955), Fleets of Stren'th (1942), Wild Wild World (1960), Hip Hip-Hurry! (1958)
426	191	"Toony Thinks This Is a Rerun"	November 8, 2022
Toony thinks he's seen this episode before, but Bill insists this is not a rerun. Featured cartoons: Shutter Bugged Cat (1967), Hyde and Go Tweet (1960), Vim, Vigor and Vitaliky (1936), Pink Paradise (1967), A Hare Grows in Manhattan (1947)
427	192	"Guise and Dolls"	November 10, 2022
Bill attempts to trick Toony into going to the veterinarian, but Toony gets wise to Bill's plan and installs a trick of his own. Featured cartoons: The Duck Doctor (1952), Guided Muscle (1955), Fish Tales (1936), Ventriloquist Cat (1950), Dr. Devil and Mr. Hare (1964)
428	193	"Fantastic Friday #53"	November 11, 2022
On this "Fan-Tastic Friday", Bill and Toony get a visit from a very special guest, Cheryl Chase. Featured cartoons: Fast and Furry-ous (1949), The Scarlet Pumpernickel (1950), Mouse for Sale (1955), In the Pink (1967), Baton Bunny (1959); Special Guest Appearance: Cheryl Chase as herself.
429	194	"All About Me-Man"	November 14, 2022
Bill and Toony get a visit from everyone's favorite robot, Me-Man. Featured cartoons: The Heckling Hare (1941), Les Miserobots (1968), Pink Outs (1967), The Spinach Overture (1935), Tired and Feathered (1965)
430	195	"Hot Diggity Bananas!"	November 15, 2022
Bill and Toony welcome Al B. Quirky as guest curator for the day. Featured cartoons: Salt Water Tabby (1947), Feud with a Dude (1968), The Man on the Flying Trapeze (1934), Ape Suzette (1966), Fair and Worm-er (1946), Gopher Broke (1958)
431	196	"Logo a Go-Go"	November 16, 2022
Bill is sponsored by Cleam and gets into an epic car race. Featured cartoons: Gee Whiz-z-z-z-z-z-z (1956), Fool Coverage (1952), Mutts About Racing (1958), Greedy for Tweety (1957), The Hasty Hare (1952)
432	197	"Quite a Parody"	November 17, 2022
Bill and Toony inform us about cartoon parodies. Featured cartoons: One Meat Brawl (1947), I'm Just Wild About Jerry (1965), Alona on the Sarong Seas (1942), Pink Is a Many Splintered Thing (1968), A Squeak in the Deep (1966), Strife with Father (1950)
433	198	"Fantastic Friday #54"	November 18, 2022
In another "Fan-Tastic Friday", Bill and Toony take requests and answer mail from viewers. Featured cartoons: Hare Do (1949), Dixieland Droopy (1954), Porky's Hotel (1939), Super Pink (1966), Beep, Beep (1952)
434	199	"Yee Howdy Gets an Oil Change"	November 21, 2022
Yee Howdy takes over the studio. Featured cartoons: Fowl Weather (1953), Feather Bluster (1958), Cat-Tastrophy (1949), Double or Mutton (1955), Corn Plastered (1951), Downhearted Duckling (1954)
435	200	"Friendsgiving, Friends-taking"	November 22, 2022
Toony hosts a Friendsgiving Party, but it doesn't go as planned. Featured cartoons: Holiday for Drumsticks (1949), Tom Turkey and his Harmonica Humdingers (1940), The Mouse on 57th Street (1961), When the Cat's Away (1935), A Sheep in the Deep (1962)
436	201	"I Have Yellow Pants!"	November 23, 2022
Bill gets new pants and Toony can't stop roasting him. Plus, they get a visit from one of Bill's old childhood friends. Featured cartoons: Elmer's Pet Rabbit (1941), Bah Wilderness (1943), Birdy and the Beast (1944), The Hypo-Chondri-Cat (1950), There They Go-Go-Go! (1956)
437	202	"Fantastic Friday #55"	November 25, 2022
In another "Fan-Tastic Friday", Bill and Toony take requests and answer mail from viewers. Featured cartoons: Hillbilly Hare (1950), Blackboard Jumble (1957), She Was an Acrobat's Daughter (1937), Shakespearian Spinach (1940), The Solid Tin Coyote (1966)
438	203	"We (Christmas) Card Hard"	November 29, 2022
Bill and Toony scramble to find a third person to appear in their Christmas card photo. Featured cartoons: Weasel While You Work (1958), The Peachy Cobbler (1950), Cracked Quack (1952), A Street Cat Named Sylvester (1953), Freeze Frame (1979)
439	204	"Two Truths & a Lie"	December 1, 2022
Toony learns something new about Bill when they play "Two Truths and a Lie". Featured cartoons: Rabbit Fire (1951), Banty Raids (1963), The Paneless Window Washer (1937), Easy Peckin's (1953), A Pair of Sneakers (1969), The Missing Mouse (1953)
440	205	"Fantastic Friday #56"	December 2, 2022
In a special edition of "Fan-Tastic Friday", Bill and Toony interview artist and toy designer Jim Engel. Featured cartoons: Baby Puss (1943), Gone Batty (1954), Along Came Daffy (1947), Bear De Guerre (1968), Baby Bottleneck (1946); Special Guest Appearance: Jim Engel as himself.
441	206	"Miami Voice"	December 5, 2022
Bill and Toony take a look at cartoons featuring the voices of classic sitcom stars. Featured cartoons: Dog Gone People (1960), A Peck o' Trouble (1953), Big Game Haunt (1968), The Hole Idea (1955), A Feud There Was (1938), Superior Duck (1996)
441	206–S	"Tiny Toony's Christmas Carol"	December 5, 2022
Bill teaches Toony the meaning of Christmas with his own unique spin on the Dickens classic A Christmas Carol and a collection of heartwarming cartoons. Featured cartoons: Bugs Bunny's Christmas Carol (1979), The Pups' Christmas (1936), The Peachy Cobbler (1950), Holiday Land (1934), Mister and Mistletoe (1955), The Night Before Christmas (1941), Gift Wrapped (1952), Bedtime for Sniffles (1940), Fright Before Christmas (1979); Note: This episode aired in prime-time. Special Guest Appearance: Lisa Whelchel as herself.
442	207	"Pawned!"	December 6, 2022
Toony opens up a pawn shop. Featured cartoons: The Stupor Salesman (1948), Choose Your 'Weepins' (1935), Vitamin Pink (1966), Porky's Five & Ten (1938), A Bird in a Guilty Cage (1952)
443	208	"Your Dad Will Love This"	December 7, 2022
Bill and Toony salute the troops with patriotic cartoons. Featured cartoons: Draftee Daffy (1945), The Draft Horse (1942), Wacky Blackout (1942), Ration Fer the Duration (1943), Falling Hare (1943)
444	209	"2nd Annual Not so Special Christmas Special"	December 8, 2022
It's Bill and Toony's second annual "Not so Special Christmas Special", featuring cartoons starring Sylvester, Tweety, Tom & Jerry, and Bugs Bunny. Featured cartoons: Hare Force (1944), The A-Tom-inable Snowman (1966), A Gander at Mother Goose (1940), Alpine Antics (1936), Snow Business (1953)
445	210	"Fantastic Friday #57"	December 9, 2022
Get ready for another "Fan-Tastic Friday". Featured cartoons: That's My Mommy (1955), Homesteader Droopy (1954), Go Fly a Kit (1957), Norman Normal (1968), Soup or Sonic (1980)
446	211	"Name That Toon"	December 13, 2022
Bill shares some big cartoon names with Toony. Featured cartoons: The Three Little Pups (1953), Dough Ray Me-Ow (1948), Tot Watchers (1958), Robin Goodhood (1970), Catty Cornered (1953), A Taste of Catnip (1966)
447	212	"Employee of the Month"	December 14, 2022
Bill becomes MeTV's newest employee of the month, but his award is met with misunderstanding. Featured cartoons: Hot-Rod and Reel! (1959), Bad Ol' Putty Tat (1949), Pink Pistons (1966), Rabbit of Seville (1950), Nasty Quacks (1945)
448	213	"Advent Calendar"	December 15, 2022
Toony creates a special Advent Calendar to celebrate Christmas. Featured cartoons: Gift Wrapped (1952), Much Ado About Nutting (1953), Cock-a-Doodle Deux-Deux (1966), Tom's Photo Finish (1957), Seasin's Greetinks! (1933), The Million Hare (1963)
449	214	"Fantastic Friday #58"	December 16, 2022
Bill shows off some of his Christmas collectibles on this newest edition of "Fan-Tastic Friday". Featured cartoons: The Year of the Mouse (1965), Naughty Neighbors (1939), A Sunbonnet Blue (1937), Canadian Can-Can (1967), Daffy Duck & Egghead (1938)
450	215	"Girl Power!"	December 19, 2022
Bill and Toony show six cartoons featuring female characters. Featured cartoons: Muzzle Tough (1954), Olive Oyl for President (1948), Little Nobody (1935), Kiss Me Cat (1953), Love Me, Love My Mouse (1966), Bewitched Bunny (1954)
451	216	"Bill's Dad Decorates"	December 21, 2022
Bill's Dad tries to decorate the Christmas tree, but he gets locked in the garage. Featured cartoons: Goldimouse and the Three Cats (1960), One Ham's Family (1943), Sleepy-Time Squirrel (1954), Christmas Comes But Once A Year (1936), Rabbit's Feat (1960)
452	217	"Fishy Flops"	December 22, 2022
Bill unveils some trendy new footwear: fish flip flops that resemble Toony. Featured cartoons: Catch as Cats Can (1947), Holiday for Shoestrings (1946), Fin'n Catty (1943), Little Quacker (1950), Goofy Gophers (1947)
453	218	"Fantastic Friday #59"	December 23, 2022
Bill and Toony celebrate a very special "Fan-Tastic Friday" with a premiere of a classic Christmas cartoon. Featured cartoons: Bully for Bugs (1953), Billy Boy (1954), War and Pieces (1970), Fox-Terror (1957), Rudolph the Red-Nosed Reindeer (1948)
454	219	"Bill Eats a Bad Sandwich"	December 27, 2022
Bill has a very strange dream after eating a moldy sandwich and passing out on the studio floor. Featured cartoons: Tweet Dreams (1959), Porky's Cafe (1942), The Hep Cat (1942), Sniffles Takes a Trip (1940), Hot Cross Bunny (1948)
455	220	"Mr. Quizzer's New Year's Eve"	December 28, 2022
Bill and Toony get ready for New Year's Eve of 2023 (with fireworks) by watching an old broadcast of a party from 1986 hosted by Mr. Quizzer. Featured cartoons: The Wabbit Who Came to Supper (1942), Holiday Highlights (1940), More Pep (1936), Pink Pajamas (1964), Rushing Roulette (1965)
