= A Bird in a Guilty Cage =

- Title card
- Directed by: I. Freleng
- Story by: Warren Foster
- Starring: Mel Blanc
- Music by: Carl Stalling
- Animation by: Arthur Davis; Manuel Perez; Virgil Ross; Ken Champin
- Layouts by: Hawley Pratt
- Backgrounds by: Irv Wyner
- Color process: Technicolor
- Production company: Warner Bros. Cartoons
- Distributed by: Warner Bros. Pictures; The Vitaphone Corporation
- Release date: August 30, 1952 (US)
- Running time: 7:01
- Language: English

A Bird in a Guilty Cage is a 1952 Looney Tunes animated short directed by Friz Freleng. The short was released on August 30, 1952, and stars Tweety and Sylvester. The title is a pun on the song "A Bird in a Gilded Cage".

== Plot ==
Sylvester is at a store called Stacy's, where he notices Tweety in the window stand. Going through the package slot, he closes the curtains and climbs up to Tweety's cage, who asks him what he's going to do. After asiding to the audience, "How naive can ya get?", Sylvester replies that they're going to play a game called Sandwich, involving Tweety getting sandwiched in two slices of bread and nearly eaten ("I don't wike dat game!").

Tweety flees, with Sylvester in hot pursuit. The cat is forced to stack mannequins on top of each other to reach the canary, who is hiding in the lighting. Tweety climbs down and puts skates on the mannequin statue to push the structure down some stairs. He returns however, and the chase resumes, leading him to a hat sale, where he begins trying on hats. He finds the one with Tweety on top, and tries to smash him, instead hitting himself.

Tweety then hides in a dollhouse; Sylvester reaches in to try to grab Tweety, but ends up getting his index finger covered in yellow dye; seeing it, he assumes it to be Tweety, as he produces a revolver, points it inside the dollhouse, and fires, resulting in Sylvester shooting his own finger. Undeterred, Sylvester grabs a hunting rifle from the sporting goods section and fires at a fleeing Tweety, leaving bullet holes in the floor and wall. Tweety scrambles into the hole in the wall for cover; naturally, Sylvester shoves the muzzle of the rifle into the hole in the wall, only for the gun's muzzle to seemingly emerge from the hole in the floor aiming at Sylvester's rear end. Sylvester decides to tie a red ribbon around the muzzle of the rifle and sticks it back into the hole in the wall, and from the hole in the floor emerges a gun muzzle with a yellow ribbon tied around it. Convinced that the muzzle popping up from under the floor is a fake, Sylvester fires his rifle, only for the gun below to shoot him in the buttocks. Sylvester yanks his rifle out of the hole in the wall to find that it's the gun with the yellow ribbon tied around the muzzle.

Tweety then goes through the pneumatic tubes of Stacy's, with Sylvester going to the other end to catch him. However, Tweety comes out a different hole, and puts a stick of dynamite in. Sylvester swallows it, thinking he has gotten Tweety, but as he strolls out, it explodes, leaving him blackened. He then decides to cross off birds from his diet, saying to himself that "That one sort of upset my stomach!".

== Trivia ==
- Sylvester would check birds off his diet list in two other cartoons, Tweet Zoo and Trip for Tat.
- Mel Blanc's voice for Tweety was raised to an extra pitch in this cartoon and would stay at that pitch until Muzzle Tough released in 1954. It actually first happened in the 1950 short Canary Row, but went back to the original edited pitch in the 1951 short, Putty Tat Trouble.
- The rifle gag would later be recycled in A Star is Bored (also directed by Friz Freleng) and Tease for Two (directed by Robert McKimson), both instances seeing Daffy Duck in place of Sylvester.

== Home media ==
- Looney Tunes Golden Collection: Volume 2 DVD
- Looney Tunes Collector's Vault: Volume 2 Blu-ray
