= Ready, Set, Zoom! =

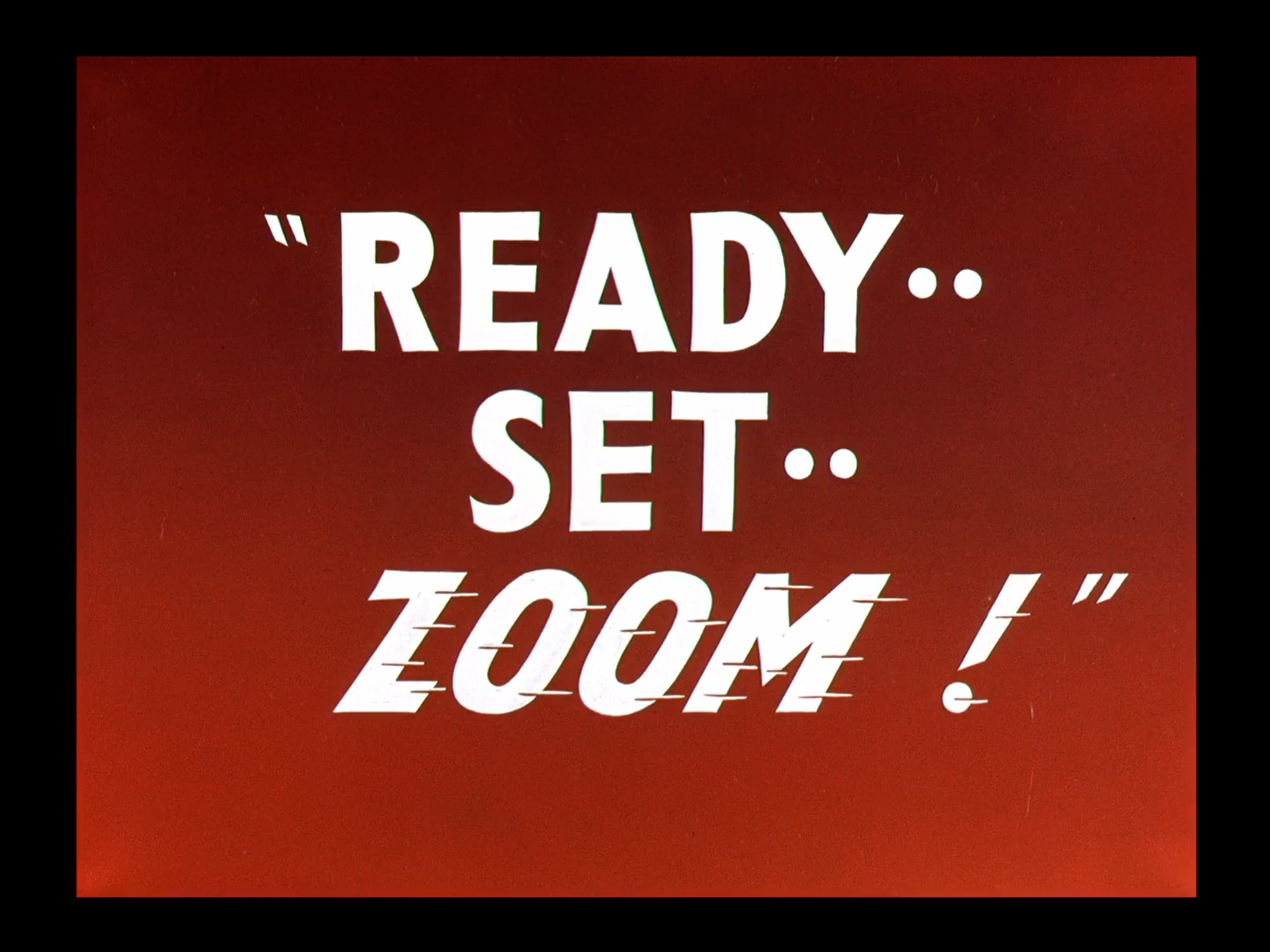
- Title card
- Directed by: Chuck Jones
- Story by: Michael Maltese
- Music by: Carl Stalling
- Animation by: Ken Harris; Abe Levitow; Richard Thompson; Lloyd Vaughan; Ben Washam
- Layouts by: Maurice Noble
- Backgrounds by: Philip DeGuard
- Color process: Technicolor
- Production company: Warner Bros. Cartoons
- Distributed by: Warner Bros. Pictures
- Release date: April 30, 1955
- Running time: 7 minutes

Ready, Set, Zoom! is a 1955 Warner Bros. Looney Tunes cartoon directed by Chuck Jones. The short was released on April 30, 1955, and stars Wile E. Coyote and the Road Runner.

== Plot ==
The Road Runner (with the mock Binomial nomenclature Speedipus Rex) is in the middle of the road. After surveying his surroundings, he dashes at hyper speed onto a low plateau, then continues to mountain roads and leaves dust clouds everywhere. Meanwhile, Wile E. Coyote (Famishus-Famishus) emerges from his cave after a good night's sleep and is soon fully awoken by a Beep-beep. He peeks over the plateau to see the Road Runner at the bottom and strides down the vertical edge with eating utensils, in pursuit of breakfast. The Road Runner taunts his nemesis by dodging at the last possible moment, allowing the coyote to slam into the rock floor. The chase moves to the real roads, and the Road Runner taunts him with a Beep-beep before blasting into Mach 187, disappearing beyond the 10 mile horizon in only 6 frames of film, causing Wile E.'s entire jaw to hang open and then drop out as he enters a cloud. The coyote trails dust as he reclines on a low rock to think about what to do next.

1. Wile E. covers an entire section of a canyon with ACME glue, making sure to leave space for himself to stand. However, the approaching "beep" belongs to a truck and not the Road Runner, and thus the coyote lacks sufficient time to escape the glue; he tries anyway and cannot leap far enough before he gets stuck, and can only watch as he is flattened.

2. Wile E. thus tries another method: covering a low rockface with ACME glue and preparing, from a distance, to throw dynamite at the Road Runner. However, the bird's velocity causes the glue to part sideways, drowning Wile E. in his hiding place and preventing him from throwing the dynamite. After failing at this and at blowing out the fuse, he begins walking with his buttocks (his legs are glued to the stick) in an effort to allow the wind to snuff or slow the burning fuse, then jumps into a nearby river; however, the explosive detonates about three feet above, and the coyote pauses in midair before he falls into the water.

3. A detour sign points through a hollow log, and the Road Runner "falls" for the trap by dashing in at full speed. The camera zooms out to show that the exit leads only to air, but does not show the Road Runner; it then cuts to him perched on the very edge of the log. Wile E. is puzzled and climbs into the log; the bird beeps and exits out a hole in the top, and the coyote peeks out after him, but his weight causes the log to tip over the cliff.

4. Now, the coyote hopes to flatten the bird with a 10,000-lb weight supported by a pair of pulleys. However, the weight does not drop when the coyote lets go of the rope, only falling on the coyote when he resumes the chase. Wile E. strolls into view postured like a walking barchair.

5. Seeing the Road Runner approach his cliff lair, Wile E. lights a sequence of fireworks attached to a lasso, but the Road Runner is actually running down a different cliff, and the coyote inertially spins the lasso until the hissing fireworks explode.

6. Next, Wile E. loads himself into a slingshot and retreats for maximum velocity, until he backs into a beeping Road Runner; the slingshot fires before he can grab the bird, and the coyote flies two feet above the ground, into a tunnel, and is squashed into a passing truck's grille.

7. Wile E. uses an outboard motor, a jim-dandy wagon, a washtub, water, and roller skates to create a hydropowered wagon that will hopefully lead him on his quest. He soon passes a DANGER BRIDGE OUT sign and cannot stop the wagon from running off the bridge; he finally unties himself from the wagon by the moment he reaches thin air, but sees the rope dropping to the road below and, worst of all, the wagon arriving safely at the other end of the bridge. The coyote funereally waves goodbye to the camera and then plummets into the road while doing a lowered steeple with his hands.

8. Wile E. observes the Road Runner's trajectory across the mountain and ignites a rocket aimed at a particular location. The camera cuts to both the rocket and the Road Runner chicken-style until the rocket hits its target location, but just after his enemy. The rocket continues down through the mountain and out of a mine (Note: The sign at the entrance to the mine says "Selzer Mining Co.", a reference to then-producer Eddie Selzer.) before giving up the ghost. Wile E. sighs with relief — and then the rocket explodes.

9. The coyote uses a female Road Runner costume to attract his counterpart, but instead ends up attracting a rout of coyotes that all look identical to him. Then they chase him down the road as the real Road Runner pulls into view with a sign that reads THE END. Then he beeps and takes off.

== See also ==
- Looney Tunes and Merrie Melodies filmography (1950–1959)
