= Lickety-Splat =

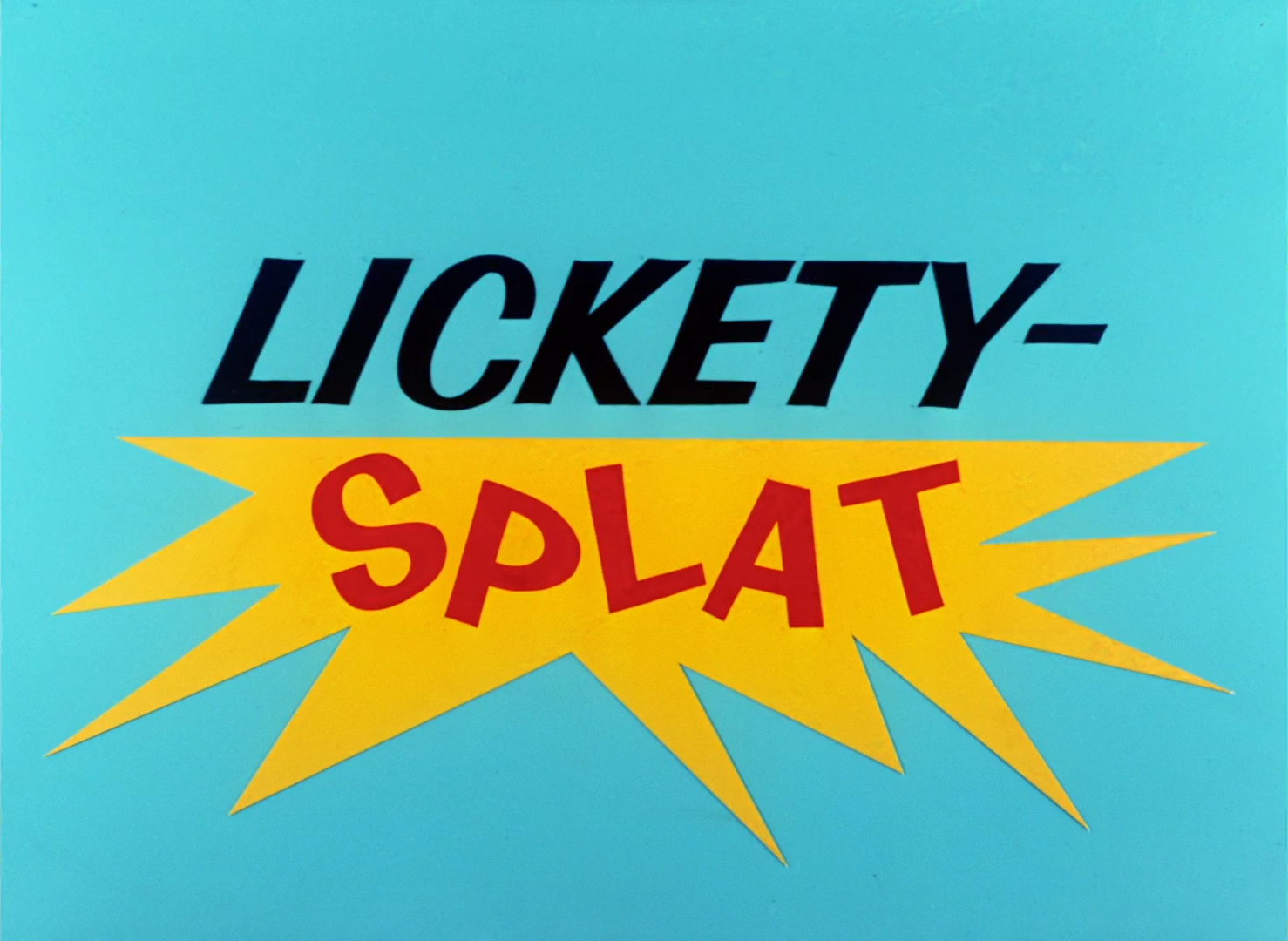
- Title card
- Directed by: Chuck Jones; Abe Levitow
- Story by: Chuck Jones
- Edited by: Treg Brown
- Music by: Milt Franklyn
- Animation by: Ken Harris; Bob Bransford; Tom Ray; Richard Thompson; Effects animation: Harry Love
- Layouts by: Maurice Noble; Assistant: Corny Cole
- Backgrounds by: Philip DeGuard; Bob Singer
- Color process: Technicolor
- Production company: Warner Bros. Cartoons
- Distributed by: Warner Bros. Pictures
- Release date: June 3, 1961
- Running time: 6 minutes
- Country: United States

Lickety-Splat is a 1961 Warner Bros. Looney Tunes theatrical animated short directed by Chuck Jones and Abe Levitow. The short was released on June 3, 1961, and stars Wile E. Coyote and the Road Runner. The title is a play on the expression "lickety-split", meaning as fast as possible.

== Plot ==
Wile E. Coyote, standing on the road, pulls out an arrow-shaped sign saying "Coyote" and another saying "Apetitius Giganticus". The Road Runner speeds by with a Beep-beep and ruffles the coyote's fur. Wile flips the signs to read "Road-Runner" and "Fastius Tasty-us", and winds up his legs, followed by his body, and chases the Road Runner. When the Road Runner sees the Coyote chasing him, he taunts him and gears into superspeed (leaving a "TOING!" in his wake). This causes the road to roll up, a tunnel to turn inside-out, and a bridge to compress itself as he puts his would-be predator far behind. Wile E. stops short of the chasm from the latter, panting, and two light bulbs appearing in place of his eyes signal his new-found idea.

1. Wile E. prepares himself to chase the Road Runner with his new roller skis, and skis off the plateau down the mountain and onto the road that the Road Runner is dashing over. As the camera cuts separately to Wile and the Road Runner, the bird turns across a U-turn at the end of a cliff, while Wile speeds off. When Wile E. realizes his mistake, he drops the ski poles, and soon slams into the side of another cliff. The Coyote looks up and down, trying to figure out how to escape, until he hears and sees the Road Runner at the top of the cliff. The skis provide a rather convenient "spring" for Wile E., who uses them to get closer and closer to grabbing the Road Runner. On his fourth jump, he is within millimeters of his opponent; but unfortunately, the downward force proves to be too much for a fifth, and the skis snap, causing him to succumb to gravity yet again.

2. The Road Runner beeps at Wile E. from across the canyon, and the camera pans to the Coyote attempting to shoot himself over the canyon with a bow. Before he can fire, the very end of the cliff crumbles and the bow tips over the side. Wile E. flips himself over in the air, but this causes him to bounce up and get his head stuck inside the edge of the cliff.

3. Wile E. lights a needle-nosed dart bomb and throws it at a target attached to a cactus, exploding all three items. He then gets in a hot air balloon with an artillery of dart bombs. Once Wile E. sees the Road Runner zipping over the road he lights the darts and releases them. The bombs circle in the air but the last one lands in the Coyote's balloon, blowing it up. He waves at the camera and falls toward the ground but stops himself by releasing a parachute. Unfortunately, another dart blows this up and Wile E. is left to wave at the camera with an AGAIN sign before resuming his plummet to the bottom. After the crash landing, a third dart follows him to the ground and explodes.

4. The darts continue to plague Wile E. from this point onwards. Wile E. leaves out a bowl of bird seed for the Road Runner while he awaits with a sledgehammer behind a turn ready to strike, but another dart plants itself into the hammerhead as the Road Runner is heard approaching and blows up the handle. The hammerhead lands on the charred Coyote's head, causing his eyes to register "TILT" like a pinball machine.

5. The Coyote hurls a boomerang at the passing Road Runner but it misses, disappears behind a rock and comes back around with another dart attached. Wile E. starts to run from the boomerang which passes him when he isn't looking. Thinking he has outrun the bomb, Coyote stops but the boomerang also stops and hovers next to him. He turns and reacts with his eyes just before it detonates.

6. Wile E. attempts a simple gun-in-the-woods trap which fails when once again another dart plugs the barrel and explodes. Adding insult to injury, yet another dart explodes under a huge boulder behind the Coyote which flies through the air and flattens him.

7. As the Road Runner traverses another road, the Coyote is shown at the top edge of a cliff, getting ready to drop an anvil. Another dart takes out a third of the cliff's edge and two more darts pepper the floating end. Wile E. jumps onto the "secure" main cliff, but the entire cliff falls down. The Coyote pulls himself on top of the anvil to avoid getting bonked on the head with it. The anvil smashes through the ground, followed by Wile E. and the floating end of the cliff with the two darts. The Coyote prepares for the worst, but instead of exploding the darts unfurl into "THE" and "END" signs. Wile E. sees them and laughs deeply in relief.

== Crew ==
- Co-Director: Abe Levitow
- Animation: Richard Thompson, Bob Bransford, Tom Ray & Ken Harris
- Layouts: Maurice Noble
- Assistant Layouts: Corny Cole
- Backgrounds: Philip DeGuard & Bob Singer
- Effects Animation: Harry Love
- Film Editor: Treg Brown
- Voice Characterizations: Mel Blanc & Paul Julian
- Music: Milt Franklyn
- Written & Directed by Chuck Jones

== Home media ==
This short is available on the Looney Tunes Collector's Choice: Volume 2 Blu-ray.
