= Canary Row =

1950 film by Friz Freleng

- Title card
- Directed by: I. Freleng
- Story by: Tedd Pierce
- Starring: Mel Blanc
- Music by: Carl Stalling
- Animation by: Virgil Ross; Arthur Davis; Emery Hawkins; Gerry Chiniquy; Ken Champin
- Layouts by: Hawley Pratt
- Backgrounds by: Paul Julian
- Color process: Technicolor
- Production company: Warner Bros. Cartoons
- Distributed by: Warner Bros. Pictures; The Vitaphone Corporation
- Release date: October 7, 1950 (United States)
- Running time: 7 minutes
- Country: United States
- Language: English

Canary Row is a 1950 Warner Bros. Merrie Melodies short directed by Friz Freleng and written by Tedd Pierce. The short was released on October 7, 1950, and stars Tweety and Sylvester.

This is the first Sylvester and Tweety cartoon to feature Granny in her debut. The title of this cartoon is a play on words from Cannery Row; Sylvester later starred in another cartoon with a similar title, Cannery Woe.

Canary Row was nominated for an Academy Award for Best Animated Short Film, but the nomination was withdrawn by its producer Edward Selzer.

== Plot ==
Sylvester the Cat, residing in the Bird-Watchers' Society building, spots Tweety through his binoculars in the neighboring Broken Arms Apartment Building window. Tweety playfully exclaims his famous catchphrase, "I tawt I taw a puddy tat!" confirming Sylvester's presence. Excited, Sylvester rushes to the building but is ejected by a guard due to a no-cats-or-dogs policy. Determined, Sylvester climbs up the drainpipe while Tweety sings, unaware of the imminent chase.

Discovering Sylvester's pursuit, Tweety calls for help and escapes his cage, leading to a chase around the room. However, Granny, Tweety's owner, intervenes and tosses Sylvester out the window. Undeterred, Sylvester devises a new plan. He attempts to climb the drainpipe again, this time inside the pipe, but Tweety drops a heavy bowling ball down the chute, causing Sylvester to swallow it accidentally. Helplessly, Sylvester rolls into Champin's Bowling Alley, causing chaos with the sounds of pins falling.

Afterward, Sylvester notices a street performance with a monkey across the street. He cleverly lures the monkey away, disguises himself as the primate, and sneaks into Granny's room. Despite his efforts to discreetly search for Tweety, Granny sees through his disguise when he politely tips his hat. She promptly strikes him with an umbrella, revealing she knew he intended to harm Tweety.

Undeterred, Sylvester gains access to the desk clerk's office and overhears a conversation between Granny and the clerk. Learning that Granny is leaving and needs someone to pick up Tweety and her luggage, Sylvester seizes the opportunity. He poses as a baggage handler and convinces Granny to give him the cage and suitcases.

With Tweety seemingly in his grasp, Sylvester carries the cage down to the alley, only to discover Granny inside. She retaliates with her umbrella once again. Still determined, Sylvester devises another plan involving a box, a plank, and a weight. He uses this contraption to reach Tweety's window. This succeeds at first, but the weight eventually lands on his head, freeing Tweety once more.

Sylvester then attempts to swing to Tweety's window but miscalculates, crashing into the wall instead. Undeterred, he notices electric wires above him and crosses the street on them. However, he narrowly escapes being electrocuted by an approaching trolley.

In a surprise twist, it is revealed that Tweety is driving the trolley, and Granny is seated next to him. Tweety exclaims his catchphrase once more, while Granny agrees. The cartoon ends with Sylvester being shocked by the trolley as it irises out.

== Production ==
Mel Blanc's voice for Tweety (except when singing) was edited to an extra higher pitch than usual for this cartoon, but would go back to its regular edited pitch in Tweety's next short, Putty Tat Trouble. This would happen again in the 1952 short A Bird In A Guilty Cage, and stayed that way from 1953 to early 1954 but would return to the original edited pitch again in Muzzle Tough.

== In linguistics ==
Sometime before fall 1980, linguistics researchers David McNeill and Elena Levy selected Canary Row as a test stimulus for a study on nonverbal communication. The film has since become a widely used standard stimulus in linguistics research on how people communicate when retelling stories to others.
