= Going! Going! Gosh! =

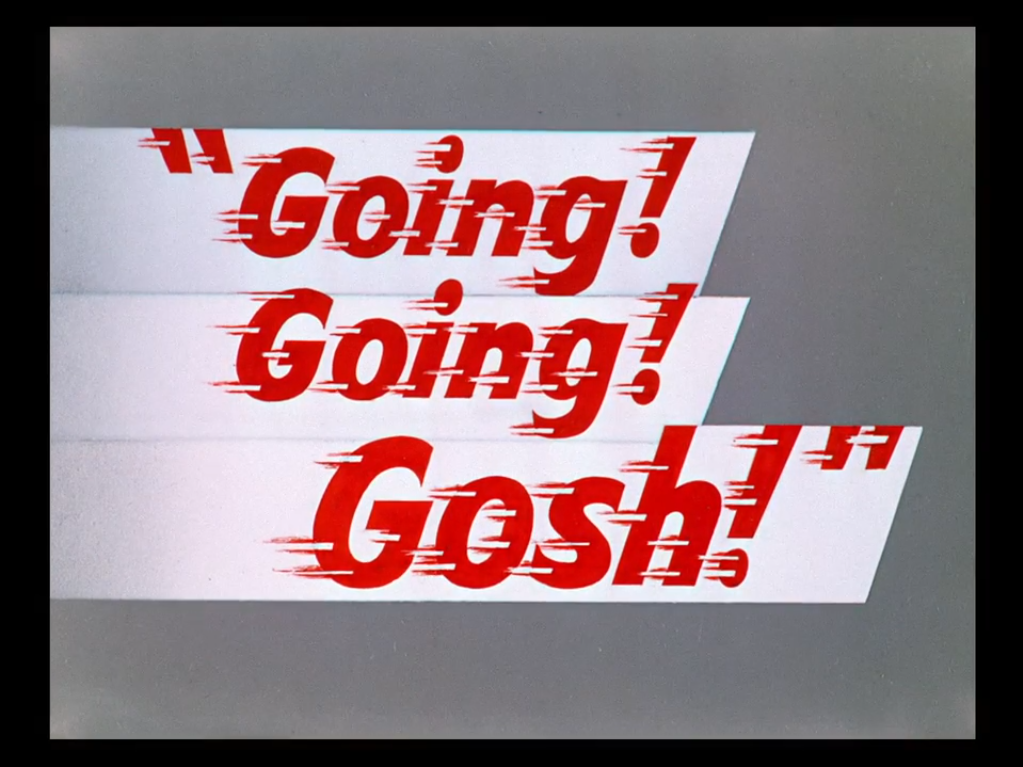
- Title card
- Directed by: Charles M. Jones
- Story by: Michael Maltese
- Music by: Carl Stalling; Milt Franklyn
- Animation by: Lloyd Vaughn; Ben Washam; Ken Harris
- Layouts by: Robert Gribbroek
- Backgrounds by: Philip De Guard
- Color process: Technicolor
- Production company: Warner Bros. Cartoons
- Distributed by: Warner Bros. Pictures; The Vitaphone Corporation
- Release date: August 23, 1952 (U.S.)
- Running time: 6:24
- Country: United States

Going! Going! Gosh! is a 1952 Warner Bros. Merrie Melodies cartoon directed by Chuck Jones. The short was released on August 23, 1952, and stars Wile E. Coyote and the Road Runner.

== Plot ==
In the pursuit depicted between Wile E. Coyote (designated with the taxonomic title "Carnivorous Vulgaris") and his elusive quarry, the Road Runner (labeled as "Acceleratti Incredibilis"), a series of elaborate strategies are employed by Coyote in his relentless pursuit of capture. The narrative unfolds with Coyote's initial concealment within a cavern, poised to ensnare the bird with his utensils, only to be thwarted as Road Runner deftly eludes him, resulting in Coyote entangling himself. Subsequent attempts at pursuit lead Coyote to experiment with various tactics, each met with comedic failure.

The endeavors include the misguided firing of a bow loaded with dynamite, resulting in self-inflicted detonation; an ill-fated attempt to employ a slingshot, which ends with Coyote wedged into a cactus; and a futile endeavor involving quick-drying cement, which Road Runner effortlessly traverses, leaving Coyote encased in his own failed trap. Further misadventures ensue as Coyote seeks refuge under a manhole, only to be thwarted by a dropped boulder, and disguises himself as a hitchhiker, only to be exposed by the astute Road Runner.

Coyote's desperation reaches its zenith with an elaborate ruse involving a painted bridge, which ultimately leads to his unwitting collision with a truck. The climax of the pursuit unfolds with Coyote's ill-fated attempt to utilize makeshift technology, resulting in a calamitous fall through the ground, punctuated by an anvil landing on his head.

The narrative concludes with Coyote's hapless pursuit culminating in a final, misguided attempt to capture Road Runner, which ends with his collision with a passing truck, leaving him dazed and entangled. The denouement features Road Runner's characteristic "Beep, beep" signifying his continued evasion of Coyote's efforts.

== Additional Crew ==
- Film Edited by Treg Brown
- Orchestration by Milt Franklyn
- Uncredited Animation by Abe Levitow and Richard Thompson

== Home media ==
Going! Going! Gosh! is available on the Looney Tunes Golden Collection: Volume 2 DVD and the Looney Tunes Platinum Collection: Volume 2 Blu-ray.

== See also ==
- Looney Tunes and Merrie Melodies filmography (1950–1959)
