= The Organ Grinder (1933 film) =

1933 film by Rudolf Ising

- Title card
- Directed by: Rudolf Ising
- Produced by: Hugh Harman; Rudolf Ising; Leon Schlesinger
- Music by: Frank Marsales
- Animation by: Rollin Hamilton; Thomas McKimson
- Color process: Black-and-white
- Production companies: Harman-Ising Productions; Leon Schlesinger Productions
- Distributed by: Warner Bros. Pictures; The Vitaphone Corporation
- Release date: April 2, 1933
- Running time: 7 min
- Country: United States
- Language: English

The Organ Grinder is a 1933 American animated comedy short film directed by Rudolf Ising. It is the 22nd film in the Merrie Melodies series. It features songs from the film 42nd Street. It was released on April 2, 1933.

== Plot ==
An organ grinder walks alongside his pet monkey on the streets. The monkey helps collect money from children by climbing up streetlights, then steals a banana which he eats by humorously unzipping the zippers on its skin. Two women who live across from each other on high skyscrapers are impressed by the performance, so the monkey climbs up to their windows through curtains and collects their money.

Just as the monkey gives his owner the earnings, nearby children come to watch the monkey dance. The monkey is scared by a cat, going into a nearby second-hand goods shop and dons a disguise that resembles Harpo Marx. He plays on the harp but then is launched out of the disguise to the children's location. He finds a poster of Laurel and Hardy at a cinema, doing impressions of Stan Laurel and Oliver Hardy before going for a piano. He then performs as a one-man band while the children sing. After playing with the cat's tail, he goes on a joyride on an automobile, crashing into a fruit seller whose wheelbarrow of fruit falls perfectly but is crushed by the man himself, a bundle of laundry and finally onto a music shop near his owner. He emerges from the rubble with the automobile enhanced by musical instruments, to the amusement of his owner.
