= Whizzard of Ow =

2003 short film

- Directed by: Bret Haaland
- Written by: Chris Kelly
- Based on: Wile E. Coyote and the Road Runner
- Produced by: Larry Doyle; Sherry Gunther
- Edited by: David Bertman
- Music by: John Frizzell
- Production company: Warner Bros. Animation (Note: Animation outsourced to Rough Draft Studios)
- Release date: November 1, 2003
- Running time: 7 minutes
- Country: United States
- Language: English

Whizzard of Ow is an American animated short film that was released on November 1, 2003. It was directed by Bret Haaland. It stars Wile E. Coyote and the Road Runner, and is the first short of these characters produced after the death of Chuck Jones on February 22, 2002. The film was included in the DVD release of Looney Tunes: Back in Action as a special feature.

== Plot ==
The short begins with a magical battle between two different stereotypes of sorcerers (a short Gandalf-like wizard that holds a large "Acme Book of Magic" in one hand and a staff in the other, and a tall Doctor Strange-like warlock with a black cat on his shoulder) where they zap each other until they zap each other in a final energy blast. Their possessions escape unharmed and fall on Wile E. Coyote, just as he was about to catch Road Runner, causing considerable pain to him (especially the cat, who viciously scratches to his face out of fear). Coyote notices the ACME book of magic and becomes delightfully happy (as his hare-like ears fall off), as he now has a new weapon against the Road Runner.

The first spell that Coyote tries is to turn the black cat into a giant feral beast to catch the Roadrunner, but it slices him in halves with its claws. Coyote buys an ACME flying broomstick and, after some trial and error, begins to chase the Road Runner through the air, but is forced to pull upward when he hears the sound of a truck horn, but it turns out to be the Road Runner with a sore throat. Coyote flies into space where his broom runs out of gas and falls back to Earth. Coyote manages to brake before he crashes, but the Road Runner scares him off a cliff. In his second spell, Coyote tries to turn himself into a giant, but much to his chagrin, the spell only affects his head, whose weight crushes his own body. Coyote uses invisible ink to make a bomb transparent and disguise it as a crystal ball in order to lure an unsuspecting Road Runner to his death. However, the fake crystal ball actually works and the Road Runner sees Coyote's future where he's caught—a future that quickly turns into reality when the bomb rolls straight to him and explodes. In his third spell, Coyote levitates a rock over a bird seed trap, but when he tries to release the rock to crush the Road Runner, nothing happens. Coyote then resorts to physical strength to get it to move until he gives up. As he walks away, the rock floats towards the Coyote and falls on him. Coyote's final spell is him using transformation on the black cat to turn it into a Pegasus. He chases the Road Runner on the Pegasus until he crashes into a train car full of deadly snakes. The Pegasus then suddenly turns into a magic carpet and crashes into more painful spots including a scorpion habitat. The carpet then starts transforming into multiple forms until it becomes a great white shark and lands in a pool of water. It is then revealed the Road Runner found the magic book and was responsible for the random transformations while testing it. He turns a mailbox into a female Road Runner and they walk off together while the Coyote is pursued by the shark.

== Cast ==
- Paul Julian
- Tress MacNeille

== Background ==
When Larry Doyle, the short film's producer, and also the writer for Looney Tunes: Back in Action, learned that Warner Bros. had a desire to "refresh the Looney Tunes brand", he went to them and "pitched an idea that involved resurrecting theatrical shorts", which had been the series' original format. According to Doyle, he thought the studio's "brand identity had fallen off the map," and "these shorts could more easily bring back their brand identity, because it is easier to duplicate the success of the shorts than it is to make a great movie with those characters". Doyle then became responsible for a program that created a "stable of theatrical shorts", which produced eight completed shorts, until the studio did not renew his contract in 2003. Whizzard of Ow was the first short to be released. Doyle also noted that the studio "tinkered with the shorts a lot after I left, and didn't make anything that I would characterize as a good change ... they made a bunch of changes like taking out some adult humor, taking out or changing jokes that they thought people wouldn't get, too smart or too weird. I think they just got really conservative."
