= A Star Is Hatched =

1938 film by Isadore Freleng

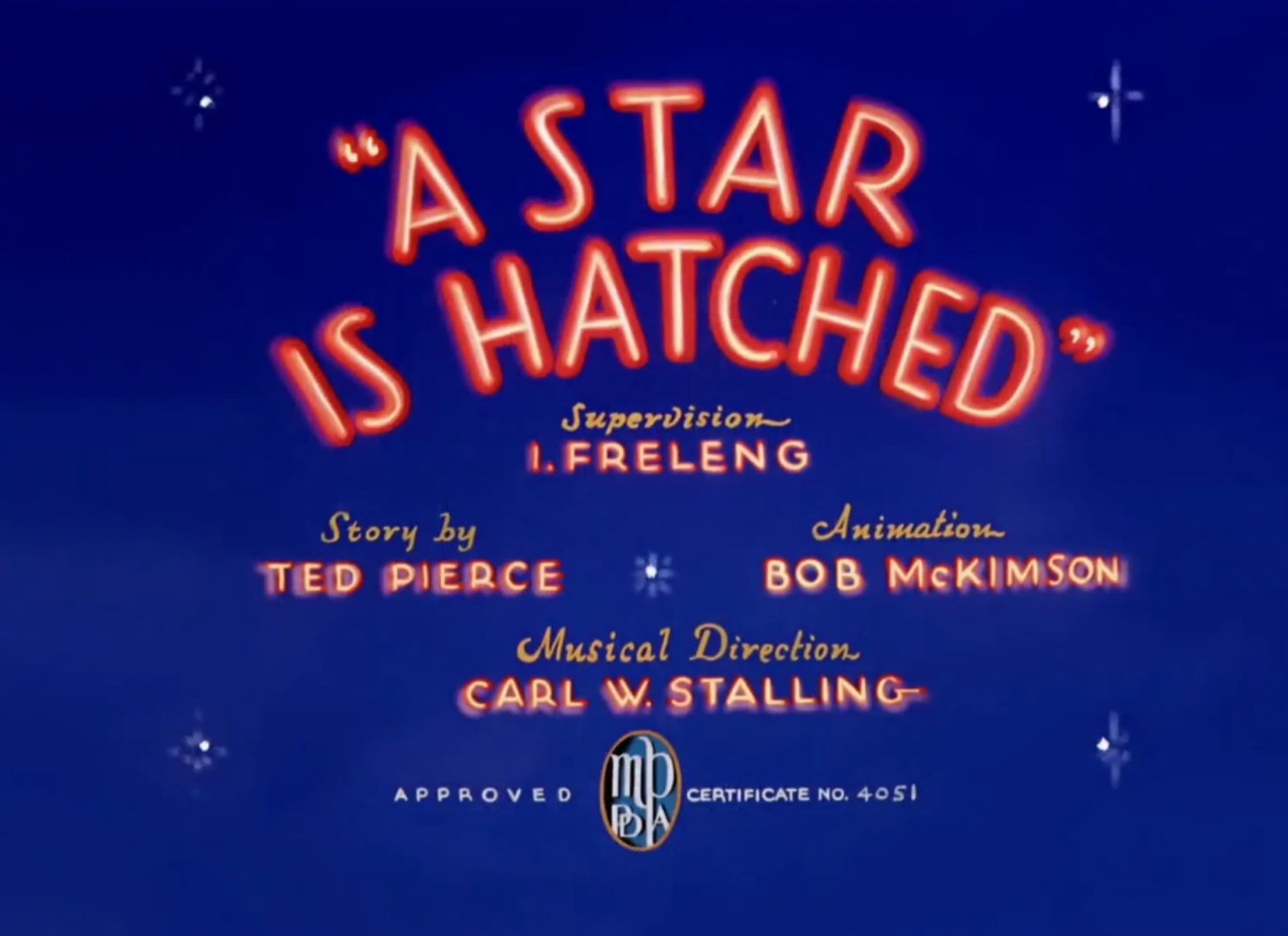
- Title card
- Directed by: Isadore Freleng
- Story by: Ted Pierce
- Produced by: Leon Schlesinger
- Music by: Carl W. Stalling
- Animation by: Bob McKimson
- Color process: Technicolor
- Production company: Leon Schlesinger Productions
- Distributed by: Warner Bros. Productions; The Vitaphone Corporation
- Release date: April 2, 1938
- Running time: 8 min
- Country: United States
- Language: English

A Star Is Hatched is a 1938 American animated comedy short film directed by Isadore Freleng. The short was released on April 2, 1938. It is the 92nd film in the Merrie Melodies series and the last to be directed by Freleng before he departed to Metro-Goldwyn-Mayer and until his return in 1940. It features various caricatures of Hollywood stars of the time.

== Plot ==
At Hickville, Emily the Chicken fantasizes about being a famous actress. Her boyfriend visits with flowers, but she rejects him while imitating Greta Garbo. J. Megga Phone, a film director for Super Super Colossal Pictures Corp. at Hollywood, Los Angeles, California, drives by for a fill-in, attracting her attention. He is impressed by Emily's appearance and gives her his business card. To her boyfriend's chagrin, she immediately leaves for Hollywood. She fails to hitchhike and manages to walk 1600 miles to Hollywood.

Hollywood is occupied by numerous caricatures of famous actors and actresses, including Clark Gable as a tram operator and W. C. Fields as a traffic police officer using his nose as the lights. Numerous tourists are brought on a 50-cent tour of the celebrities' houses, including Tarzan, who lives on the treetops and as such has no privacy, which he does not mind.

Emily finds her way to the casting room, where the executives literally cast fishing rods at an offscreen location. J. Megga Phone is at work with 15 assistant directors, the last of whom disagrees with his decision and is pummeled. He shoots a scene involving Dick Powell, who sings a number of popular songs. He returns to the casting room, where numerous hens approach him for having received his business card. Emily is unable to keep up and accepts the reality that the industry is simply too crowded for her to be successful in. She returns home and marries her boyfriend. One female chick reads an ill-placed magazine and imitates Greta Garbo again, much to her mother's disappointment.

== Reception ==
It was described as "[n]early a retelling of Let It Be Me, a 1936 Merrie Melodies cartoon.

A 1938 article in the Motion Picture Herald wrote: "They are all clever and this one is exceptionally good. Prefer Merrie Melodies to any cartoon on the market."

In a detailed analysis of the short, Hank Sartin found that "the parodic cartoon manipulated the myth of the girl who comes to Hollywood and becomes a star against all odds", thus making it a variation on the trope of "A star is born".

The character of Emily, whose voice can evoke Katharine Hepburn's, is also "thought to be an early inspiration for McKimson's Miss Prissy" in the later Foghorn Leghorn shorts.

== Home media ==
The short is available on disc 1 of the Looney Tunes Collector's Vault: Volume 3 Blu-ray set.

== See also ==
- A Star Is Born (1937 film), am American feature film released the previous year and addressing the same topic
