= A Little Soap and Water =

- Directed by: Dave Fleischer
- Produced by: Max Fleischer
- Starring: Mae Questel
- Music by: Sammy Timberg (uncredited)
- Animation by: Edward Nolan; Myron Waldman; Lillian Friedman (uncredited)
- Color process: Black-and-white
- Production company: Fleischer Studios
- Distributed by: Paramount Pictures
- Release date: June 21, 1935
- Running time: 6 minutes
- Language: English

A Little Soap and Water is a 1935 Fleischer Studios animated short film starring Betty Boop.

== Synopsis ==
Pudgy the Pup loses his bone on top of the coal bucket. Meanwhile, Betty Boop is preparing the wash tub for a dog bath. When Pudgy realizes what Betty has planned, he tries to get away. Betty has to pursue him through the house, including several laps under the living room rug. Betty finally gets Pudgy into the tub and washes him while singing the title song. Pudgy is all nice and clean, until he finds his bone, and knocks over the coal bucket to get it.

== Releases ==
A Little Soap and Water has been released as part of several different DVD compilations: by BCI Entertainment (2003 & 2004), Genius Entertainment (2004), GT Media (2004), and Mill Creek Entertainment (2007 & 2007), and Echo Bridge Home Entertainment (2007 & 2010).

== Notes ==
- Some of the song elements in the beginning are missing in most prints, and is very rare.
