= Bats in the Belfry (1942 film) =

1942 film by Jerry Brewer

- Directed by: Jerry Brewer
- Story by: Gus Arriola; Jerry Brewer
- Produced by: Rudolf Ising; Fred Quimby (uncredited)
- Starring: Pinto Colvig (uncredited)
- Music by: Scott Bradley (uncredited)
- Color process: Technicolor
- Production company: MGM Cartoons
- Distributed by: Metro-Goldwyn-Mayer
- Release date: July 4, 1942 (USA)
- Running time: 7 minutes
- Language: English

Bats in the Belfry is a 1942 American animated short film directed by Jerry Brewer for MGM and released to theaters on July 4, 1942. The short tells the story of three singing, crazy bats in a belfry.

== Plot ==
A trio of belfry-dwelling bats explain, musically, (and demonstrate) why they are associated with nuttiness.
