= More Pep =

- Directed by: Dave Fleischer
- Story by: Joe Stultz; William Turner (all uncredited)
- Produced by: Max Fleischer; Adolph Zukor
- Starring: Mae Questel; Max Fleischer
- Animation by: Dave Hoffman; Thomas Johnson; Harold Walker (unc.); Otto Feuer (unc.)
- Color process: Black-and-white
- Production company: Fleischer Studios
- Distributed by: Paramount Pictures
- Release date: June 19, 1936
- Running time: 6 minutes
- Country: United States
- Language: English

More Pep is a 1936 Fleischer Studios animated short film starring Betty Boop, and featuring Pudgy the Puppy.

== Synopsis ==
"Uncle Max" (Max Fleischer) draws Betty and Pudgy out of the inkwell. Pudgy is tired and unwilling to perform on Betty's command. Betty uses pen and ink to draw a machine that gives Pudgy more pep. The machine soon runs amok when she puts too many ingredients into the machine, speeding up not only Betty and Pudgy, but the entire city as well, including the man, the parade, the traffic (cars, trucks, vans, pickup trucks, flatbed trucks etc.) and in the house, the wallclock and the painting hang on the wall.
