= Beep, Beep (film) =

- Title card
- Directed by: Charles M. Jones
- Story by: Michael Maltese
- Music by: Carl W. Stalling
- Animation by: Ken Harris; Phil Monroe; Lloyd Vaughan; Ben Washam
- Layouts by: Robert Gribbroek
- Backgrounds by: Philip DeGuard
- Color process: Technicolor
- Production company: Warner Bros. Cartoons
- Distributed by: Warner Bros. Pictures
- Release date: May 24, 1952
- Running time: 7 minutes 5 seconds
- Country: United States

Beep, Beep is a 1952 Warner Bros. Merrie Melodies series directed by Chuck Jones. The short was released on May 24, 1952, and is the second featuring Wile E. Coyote and the Road Runner. The cartoon is named after the sound the Road Runner makes, which is often mistaken for "Meep, meep".

== Plot ==
The Road Runner (Accelerati Incredibilus) is being chased by Wile E. Coyote (Carnivorous Vulgaris) carrying a knife and fork, but the Road Runner is too fast for him. Wile E. tries using a spring-loaded glove, which fails. He crosses a tightwire to drop an anvil on the Road Runner, but the anvil is too heavy, and Wile E. is stretched all the way to the ground, alerting the Road Runner, who taunts him and runs off. Wile E. drops the anvil and is slung up into the air. As he falls, he tries using a parachute, but only random objects come out of it. He then takes some ACME aspirin and waves goodbye to the camera before hitting the ground.

Wile E. then tries to bait the Road Runner with water attached by string to a TNT device. The Road Runner ignores the water and runs up to his rival, holding a sign saying, "Road Runners can't read and don't drink". Infuriated, Wile E. chases Road Runner into a mine, putting on a helmet for light. Eventually, Wile E. lights a match to see in the dark, but happens to be in a tunnel laden with explosives, which detonates. Wile E. loads himself on a springboard in order to sling himself towards the passing Road Runner. When he cuts the rope holding him back, he is slammed into the ground.

Wile E. then tries using a rocket to chase the Road Runner. He lights the fuse, but the rocket fires directly up into the sky and explodes into fireworks showing a restaurant advertisement. He then attempts to use ACME's rocket-powered roller skates to chase the Road Runner. Wile E. is quicker than the Road Runner and gains on him. When the road takes a turn, however, the coyote shoots off a cliff and crashes into the ground. Exhausted, he tries to drink the water he previously used as a trap, and the TNT explodes.

Wile E. places a small railroad track, two bushes, himself, and a railroad stop sign in the middle of the road. This fails to stop the Road Runner, who speeds past the Coyote and leaves him lying on the track to be flattened by a train. The Road Runner relaxes on the balcony of the caboose as it departs.

== In other media ==
- The short is briefly featured in the 1996 film Space Jam, using the scene of Wile E.'s tightwire attempt. In the film's version of the scene, after Wile E. is brought down to the road by the Anvil's weight, Porky Pig shows up and interrupts the cartoon to inform Wile E. and Road Runner of an emergency meeting concerning the Tunes being taken to Moron Mountain. The new footage of the short was produced by Warner Bros. Feature Animation.

== See also ==
- Looney Tunes and Merrie Melodies filmography (1950–1959)
- Beep, beep (sound)
