= Fastest with the Mostest =

1960 film by Chuck Jones

- Directed by: Chuck Jones
- Edited by: Treg Brown
- Music by: Milt Franklyn
- Animation by: Keith Darling; Ken Harris; Richard Thompson; Ben Washam
- Layouts by: Phillip DeGuard
- Backgrounds by: Phillip DeGuard
- Color process: Technicolor
- Production company: Warner Bros. Cartoons
- Distributed by: Warner Bros. Pictures; The Vitaphone Corporation
- Release date: January 19, 1960
- Running time: 7 minutes
- Country: United States

Fastest with the Mostest is a 1960 Warner Bros. Looney Tunes cartoon directed by Chuck Jones. The short was released on January 19, 1960, and stars Wile E. Coyote and the Road Runner.

The title is a reference to the epigram "Git thar fustest with the mostest", often erroneously attributed to Nathan Bedford Forrest.

== Plot ==
In a series of comedic encounters, Wile E. Coyote (scientifically denoted as "Carnivorous-Slobbius") repeatedly attempts to capture the elusive Road Runner (identified as "Velocitus-Incalcublii"). One of his strategies is detonating a firework to ensnare Road Runner, only to be thwarted by its premature explosion, resulting in Coyote's fall off a cliff. Another endeavor involves a hot air balloon and a bomb, with Coyote inadvertently inflating himself and experiencing a chaotic journey before defusing the bomb, which ultimately explodes regardless. Further attempts entail luring Road Runner with tranquilized bird seed, leading to Coyote's entanglement in a failed trap. Lastly, Coyote's detour sign scheme backfires, causing him to endure various mishaps, including a fall, an encounter with cutlery, and a tumultuous descent through pipes.

== Home media ==
This short is available on disc 1 of the Looney Tunes Collector's Vault: Volume 2 Blu-ray set.

== See also ==
- Looney Tunes and Merrie Melodies filmography (1960-1969)
