= Tweet and Sour =

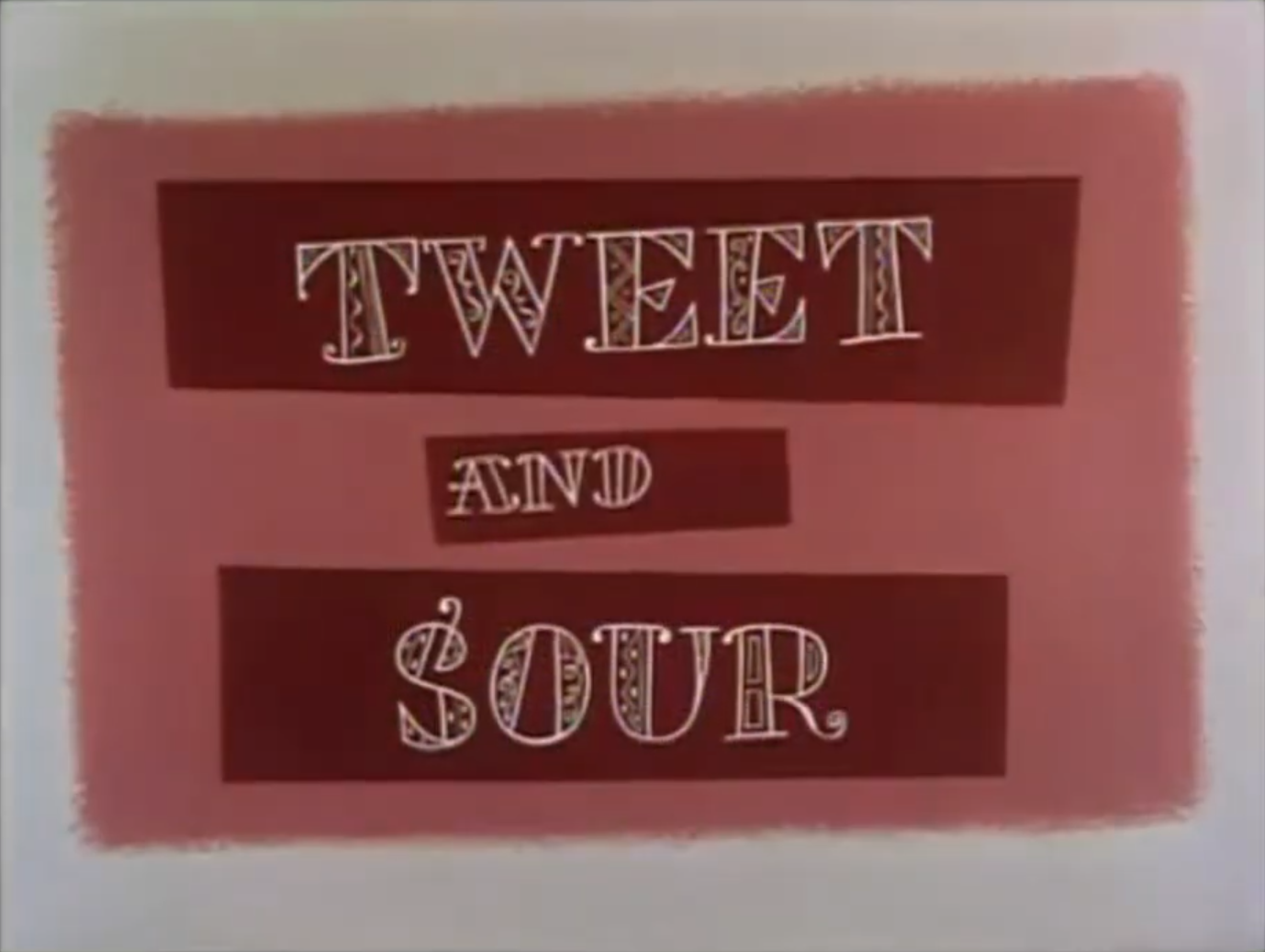
- Title card (unrestored)
- Directed by: Friz Freleng
- Story by: Warren Foster
- Starring: Mel Blanc
- Music by: Milt Franklyn
- Animation by: Virgil Ross; Arthur Davis; Gerry Chiniquy
- Layouts by: Hawley Pratt
- Backgrounds by: Irv Wyner
- Color process: Technicolor
- Production company: Warner Bros. Cartoons
- Distributed by: Warner Bros. Pictures
- Release date: March 24, 1956
- Running time: 7 mins
- Language: English

Tweet and Sour is a 1956 Warner Bros. Looney Tunes cartoon short directed by Friz Freleng. The short was released on March 24, 1956, and stars Tweety, Sylvester, Granny, and Sam Cat. The voices are performed by Mel Blanc and June Foray.

The cartoon's title is a play on the phrase "sweet and sour".

== Plot ==
Granny leaves the house for an afternoon outing, but as she drives by the house and waves goodbye to Tweety, she sees Sylvester has gotten into the house and is about to have Tweety for his supper. Granny furiously stops Sylvester in time and, fed up with his constant chasing after Tweety, gives him a harsh warning: "If there's so much as one little feather harmed on Tweety, it's off to the violin string factory!" (punctuating the warning by mimicking Frédéric Chopin's "The Funeral March").

As Sylvester cowers in fear and sulks in the corner after Granny leaves, he tries to eat Tweety again, until he reminds him of Granny's threat (also imitating The Funeral March). Sylvester wisely decides to stop and goes back to sulking in the corner of the room. However, both Tweety and Sylvester are about to face a new threat — Sam Cat (first seen in Putty Tat Trouble, but here seen wearing an eye patch). Sam is after a meal of his own and is uncaring that Sylvester will be deemed responsible if Tweety is noticed missing. As such, the chase now casts Sylvester not as the predator but as the (not-so-altruistic) protagonist who plans to save Tweety from the predatory Sam before Granny returns — more so to save his own skin. After several exchanges across the yard, with both Sylvester and Sam clobbering each other, Sylvester and Tweety make it back home and lock Sam out of the house, but the feline is still determined to get Tweety. Sylvester finally gets rid of his rival by blowing him up in Granny's chimney (by way of a lighted TNT candle tied to a balloon).

However, when Granny returns, Sylvester's efforts are in vain. As he is putting Tweety back in the cage, Granny enters and, assuming he was after Tweety, promises to make good on her earlier threat. Sylvester tries to explain what really happened before giving up and declaring: "Aw, what's the use! She'll never believe me!", then he plays Chopin on his violin and falls into the violin case as a coffin to his demise.

== Voice cast ==
- Mel Blanc as Sylvester, Tweety
- June Foray as Granny (uncredited)

== Home media ==
This short was released on disc 1 of the Looney Tunes Collector's Vault: Volume 3 Blu-ray set.

== See also ==
- List of American films of 1956
