= A Gander at Mother Goose =

1940 film by Fred Avery

- Title card
- Directed by: Fred Avery
- Story by: Dave Monahan
- Produced by: Leon Schlesinger
- Starring: Mel Blanc; Sara Berner; Margaret Hill-Talbot
- Narrated by: Robert C. Bruce
- Music by: Carl W. Stalling
- Animation by: Charles McKimson
- Color process: Technicolor
- Production company: Leon Schlesinger Productions
- Distributed by: Warner Bros. Pictures
- Release date: May 25, 1940
- Running time: 6 min
- Country: United States
- Language: English

A Gander at Mother Goose is a 1940 American animated comedy short film directed by Fred Avery. The short was released on May 25, 1940. It is part of the Merrie Melodies series.

== Plot ==
The film introduces a number of gags intertwined with classic nursery rhymes. Mother Goose is humorously credited as "technical advisor".

Mary, Mary, Quite Contrary, a caricature of actress Katharine Hepburn who resembles Avery's Red character, complains about her garden polluted by layers of trash. Humpty Dumpty falls off a wall, revealing his exposed buttocks instead of shattering to his demise as expected. Jack and Jill go on a date instead of fetching water. Little Miss Muffet scares off the spider with her unattractive appearance. The Three Little Pigs, all of whom wear outfits similar to Porky Pig, thwart the Big Bad Wolf with a bottle of mouthwash. The Parade of Wooden Soldiers turns out to be sloppy and wobbly marchers. A dog reads the rhyme "Star Light, Star Bright" and successfully wishes for a tree. Jack Be Nimble boasts about jumping over a candlestick, unaware that his buttocks are on fire. The Old Woman Who Lived in a Shoe struggles to take care of her many children while her husband relaxes. Little Hiawatha shoots an arrow, which is returned by an eagle stuck in its tail feather. The Night Before Christmas depicts two mice having a conversation; one wishes the other Merry Christmas while the other accidentally misconstrues it as excessive noise to his embarrassment.

== Home media ==
- LaserDisc - The Golden Age of Looney Tunes: Volume 2, Side 7
- DVD - Looney Tunes Golden Collection: Volume 5, Disc 2
- Streaming - HBO Max
- Streaming - Tubi
