= Fiesta Fiasco =

- Directed by: Alex Lovy
- Story by: Cal Howard
- Produced by: William L. Hendricks
- Starring: Mel Blanc
- Edited by: Hal Geer
- Music by: William Lava
- Animation by: Ted Bonnicksen; Laverne Harding; Volus Jones; Ed Solomon
- Layouts by: Jaime R. Diaz; Bob Givens; David Hanan
- Backgrounds by: Bob Abrams
- Color process: Technicolor
- Production company: Warner Bros.-Seven Arts Animation
- Distributed by: Warner Bros.-Seven Arts; Vitagraph Company of America
- Release date: December 9, 1967
- Running time: 6 minutes
- Country: United States
- Language: English

Fiesta Fiasco is a 1967 Warner Bros.-Seven Arts Looney Tunes cartoon directed by Alex Lovy. The short was released on December 9, 1967 (in real life, 1967 marked the 30th anniversary of Daffy's debut), and stars Daffy Duck and Speedy Gonzales.

== Summary ==
Speedy Gonzales and his friends are setting up balloons and streamers for a fiesta. When they learn that Daffy Duck is approaching, they cease preparing and hide. When Daffy asks about the decorations, Speedy says that he does not see anything.

Daffy concludes that the mice have planned a party and have chosen not to invite him. He then sets out on ruining the party. He builds a machine that creates a raincloud. Instead of raining on the mice, the cloud follows Daffy and causes him many problems. He is struck by lightning, is caught up in a tornado and is constantly rained upon (it's possible the raincloud had a will of its own and didn't want Daffy to ruin the preparations).

After suffering much torture from the raincloud, Daffy attempts to suck the cloud into a vacuum cleaner and release it over the mice's party. Failing to do so, Daffy ultimately lands inside what turns out to be his birthday cake and learns from Speedy that the fiesta is really his surprise birthday party. As the raincloud reappears and begins raining over him, Daffy bursts into tears of happiness, touched by the mice's gesture.

== See also ==
- List of American films of 1967
- List of cartoons featuring Daffy Duck
- List of Speedy Gonzales cartoons
