= Putty Tat Trouble =

- Title card
- Directed by: I. Freleng
- Story by: Warren Foster
- Starring: Mel Blanc
- Music by: Carl Stalling
- Animation by: Arthur Davis; Manuel Perez; Ken Champin; Virgil Ross
- Layouts by: Hawley Pratt
- Backgrounds by: Paul Julian
- Color process: Technicolor
- Production company: Warner Bros. Cartoons
- Distributed by: Warner Bros. Pictures; The Vitaphone Corporation
- Release date: February 24, 1951
- Running time: 7:25
- Country: United States
- Language: English

Putty Tat Trouble is a 1951 Warner Bros. Looney Tunes animated short directed by Friz Freleng. The short was released on February 24, 1951, and stars Tweety and Sylvester. It also marks the debut of Sylvester's recurring rival Sam Cat, who would next appear in 1956's Tweet and Sour.

== Plot ==
Tweety is shoveling snow from his nest ("Dis is what I det for dweamin' of a white Quithmuth!") when, from the windows of brownstone apartments across the street from each other, Sylvester and Sam Cat notice him. They both race to capture him, only to realize they will have to battle each other.

The two cats must constantly one-up each other, and they take turns successfully taking possession of Tweety, but the bird always slips away and the cats end up getting hurt. Tweety seems to be enjoying himself (i.e. sharing a drink with a "pwaymate" bird, which is actually a drinking bird toy, asking Sam to take him for a ride again, after having slid with the unconscious feline down a staircase). The cartoon hits its climax when the cats chase the bird to a frozen pond on which is posted a sign warning of thin ice. It appears Tweety has fallen in, his hat is next to a hole near the center of the pond. The cats slip and slide over and, while Sam reaches his paw in to see if he can find Tweety, they both become aware of a chipping sound. Tweety is using an ice pick to cut a circle around the cats. He pauses a moment and asks them to throw his hat to him. They desperately oblige, in a bid for mercy; Tweety thanks them and completes the circle, causing the cats to fall into the frigid water.

Tweety is then shown having resumed shoveling snow from his nest. Sylvester and Sam are in their respective homes, obviously suffering from bad colds (shivering, wrapped in a warm blanket, feet in a tub of warm water, continuously sneezing). Tweety says, "Gesundheit!" to each, looks at the audience and says, "The poow putty tats", and resumes his work as the cartoon ends.

== See also ==
- List of cartoons featuring Sylvester
