= Beep, beep (sound) =

Onomatopoeia of consecutive beeps such as a car horn

"Beep, beep" is onomatopoeia representing a noise, generally of a pair of identical tones (beeps) following one after the other, often generated by a machine or device such as a car horn. It is commonly associated with the Road Runner (commonly interpreted as "meep meep") in Looney Tunes cartoons featuring the flightless and speedy bird and his constant pursuer, Wile E. Coyote. Beep, Beep is the name of a 1952 Warner Bros. cartoon in the Merrie Melodies series.

== Road Runner cartoons ==
Chuck Jones, the creator of Road Runner, has stated that this sound, the only way the Road Runner can harm the Coyote, was inspired by hearing a Doppler-like effect as background artist Paul Julian imitated a car horn when he could not see where he was going. Julian voiced the various recordings of the phrase used throughout the Road Runner cartoons, although on-screen he was uncredited for his work. Although commonly quoted as "meep meep", Warner Bros., the current owner of all trademarks relating to the duo, lists "beep, beep" as the Road Runner's sound, along with "meep, meep." According to animation historian Michael Barrier, Julian's preferred spelling of the sound effect was either "hmeep hmeep" or "mweep, mweep".

In 1978, Warner Bros. recycled the Road Runner's "beep, beep" sound for its television series, Wonder Woman, which featured a tiny robot-on-wheels named Rover who makes the "beep, beep" sound on occasion. It only appeared in the second-season episode "I.R.A.C. is Missing".

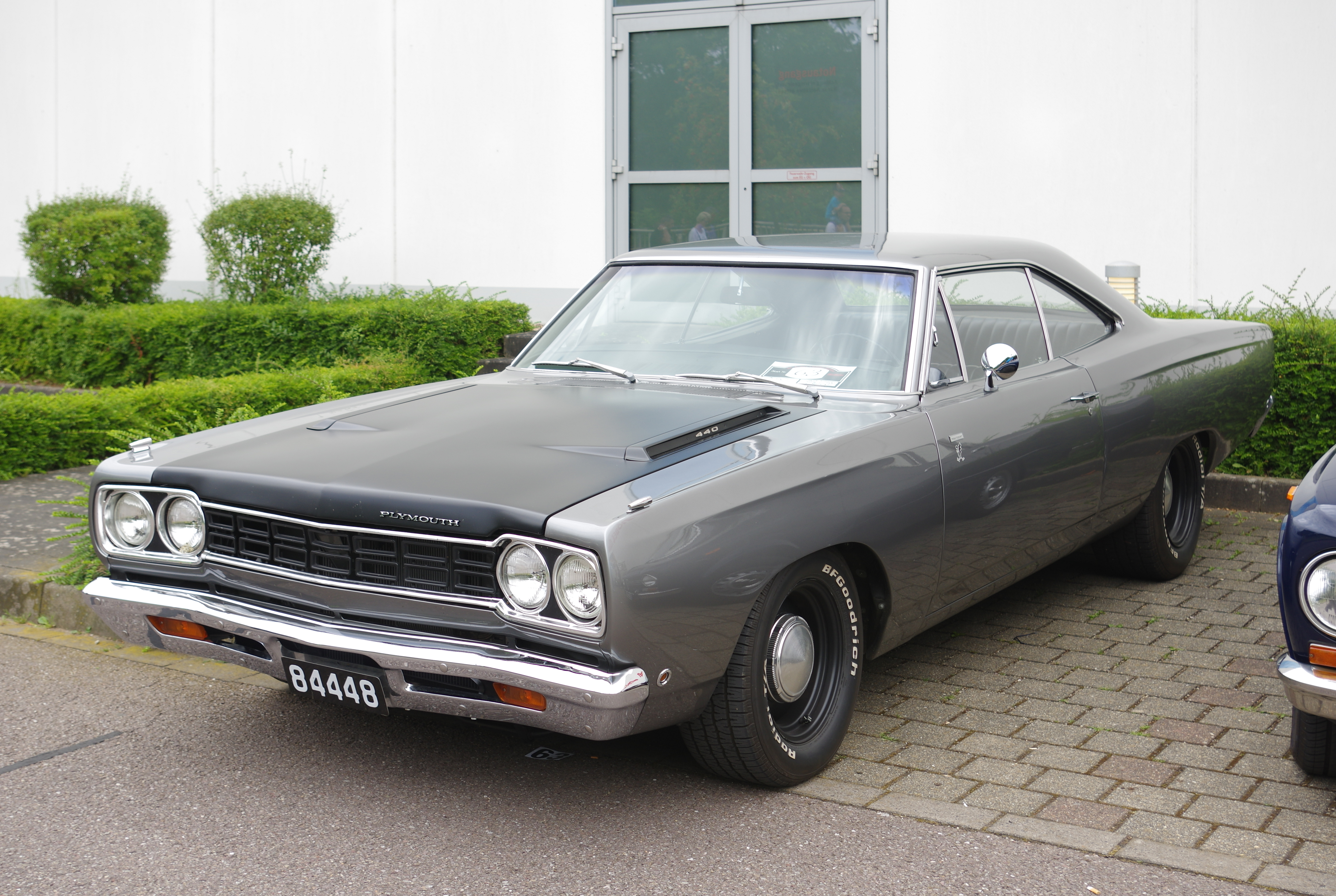
1968 Plymouth Road Runner

So popular was the image of road-burning speed inspired by the Road Runner, that Plymouth (a division of Chrysler) named one of their V8-powered "muscle car" models after the cartoon bird. The car was fitted with Road Runner decals and a horn that made the well-known "beep, beep" sound when activated.

The Road Runner cartoon also later became associated with Time Warner's Road Runner cable internet service.

In comic books, the Road Runner's actual name was given as "Beep Beep". In the Simpsons episode "The Itchy & Scratchy & Poochie Show", Homer Simpson meets a character – not Julian – named June Bellamy (herself a tribute to voice actress June Foray), who says she recorded the sound of the Road Runner. She comments, "They only paid me to say [meep] once. Then they doubled it up on the soundtrack." The couch gag featured in another Simpsons episode, "Smoke on the Daughter", features Maggie Simpson imitating the Road Runner's "beep, beep" sound after the rest of the Simpson family runs into the painting of a fake couch created by Wile E. Coyote.

== The Playmates ==
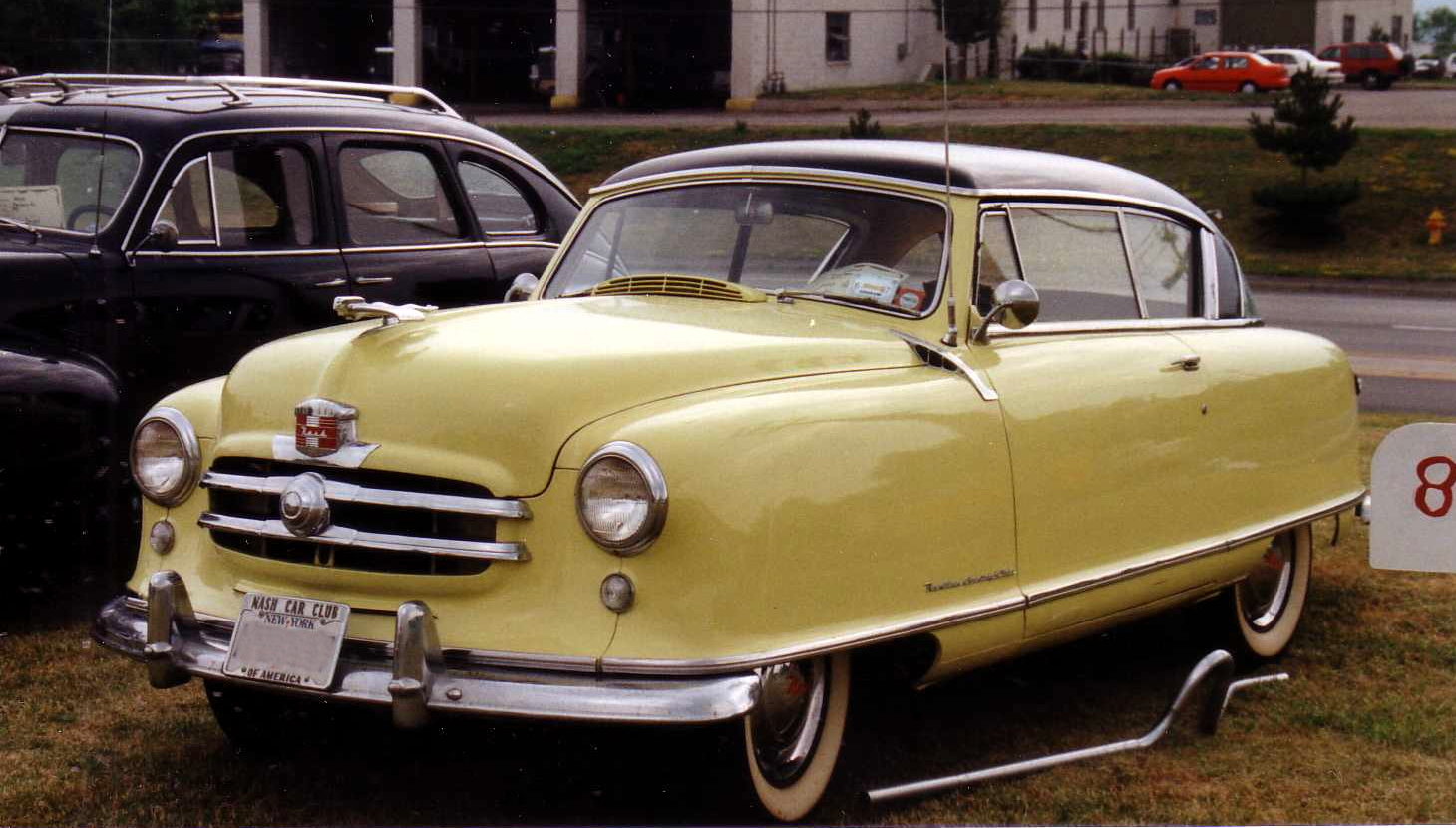
1951 Nash "Country Club" 2-door hardtop

"Beep, Beep" ("The Little Nash Rambler") was a song which utilized the "beep, beep" sound in a tempo-changing novelty record recorded by the Playmates in 1958. The record became a #4 hit on the Billboard Top 40 record chart for twelve weeks. The lyrics tell the story of how the beep-beep horn of the "Little Nash Rambler" following close behind the driver of a Cadillac infuriates him into going ever faster—but the Rambler driver keeps pace with the Cadillac, in order to yell out of his window to the Cadillac driver in the final line of the song, "Hey, buddy, how can I get this car out of second gear?"
