= Foxy by Proxy =

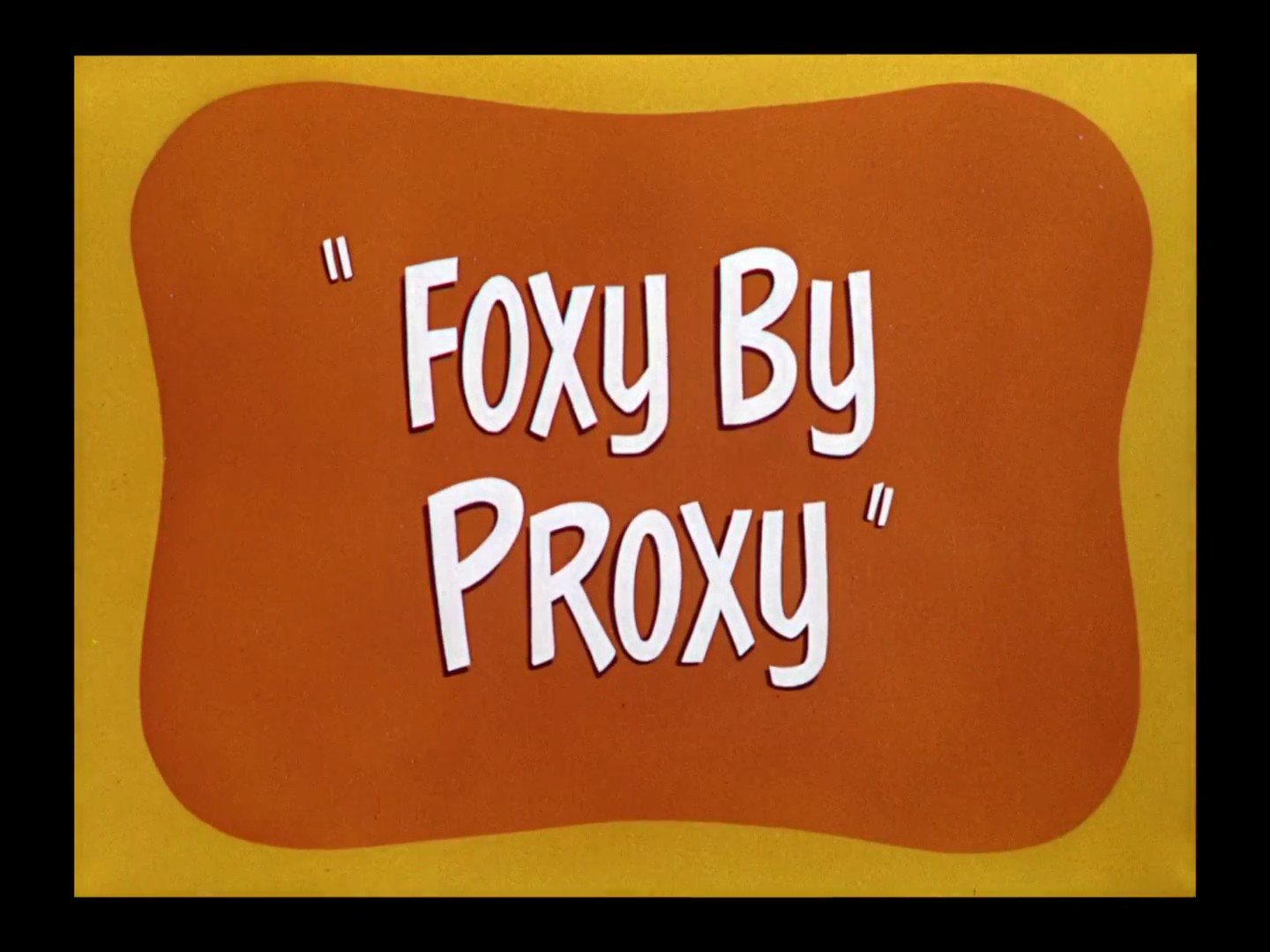
- Title card
- Directed by: I. Freleng
- Story by: Warren Foster
- Starring: Mel Blanc; Stan Freberg (uncredited)
- Music by: Carl Stalling
- Animation by: Virgil Ross; Arthur Davis; Manuel Perez; Ken Champin
- Layouts by: Hawley Pratt
- Backgrounds by: Irv Wyner
- Color process: Technicolor
- Production company: Warner Bros. Cartoons
- Distributed by: Warner Bros. Pictures; The Vitaphone Corporation
- Release date: February 23, 1952
- Running time: 7:01
- Language: English

Foxy by Proxy is a 1952 Warner Bros. Merrie Melodies short cartoon directed by Friz Freleng. The short was released on February 23, 1952, and features Bugs Bunny and Willoughby the Dog, in the latter's last appearance. Mel Blanc voices Bugs Bunny, while an uncredited Stan Freberg voices Willoughby and one of the dogs that talks in the short. This cartoon is considered a remake to Of Fox and Hounds from 1940; in fact, the opening sequence was "borrowed" directly from the original.

During a fox hunt, Bugs disguises himself as a fox to play tricks on the hunting dogs. With most of them not caring if their prey is a fox or a rabbit.

== Plot ==
An enormous number of smaller hounds come out of a giant dog house, the crowd of dogs behaving like a barking river or tidal wave; followed by a large fox hound (Willoughby, voiced by Freberg) who is excited by the prospect of the hunt, especially the moment where the fox's tail is to be cut off. The hunters and dogs then pass over Bugs' hole, waking him, with the large fox hound lagging behind. Once Bugs directs Willoughby to where the others went, Bugs dons a fox costume and begins to play tricks with Willoughby, leaving Bugs amazed at the dog's inability to recognise a fox.

Once the large hound realizes the difference, he runs back to the tree where Bugs is now undressed. The bunny giggles at Willoughby's intelligence, saying that "I've seen better heads on a glass of root beer!" At this point, Bugs (with his fox costume back on) stamps fox tracks to mislead this hound, which lead to train tracks, which Willoughby continues to follow. Once Willoughby reaches Bugs and tries to get him, Bugs questions what kind of tracks the dog was following, which ends up putting Willoughby on the front of a locomotive, while Willoughby exclaims that he caught a train.

Meanwhile, the other dogs have caught up to Bugs in his costume and he tries to evade them, but to no avail. When he reveals that he is a rabbit, one of the dogs (also voiced by Freberg) declares that they are now after rabbits. After a short chase, which includes Bugs running through an open log, Bugs then runs back into the log, and while the dogs run into it, Bugs turns the log three times to ensure that the crowd of dogs always run off the cliff, with the crowd falling to the ground after the third turn (a gag that was recycled from All This and Rabbit Stew and The Big Snooze, complete with checking for land before the third turn). While Bugs is chuckling at their misfortune, Willoughby sneaks up behind Bugs with a pair of scissors, cuts Bugs' tail off, and runs away with it. Bugs shrugs to the audience, "Just call me Stubby!". He walks away, his cottontail missing.

== Home media ==
- Laserdisc - Bugs & Friends
- DVD - Looney Tunes Super Stars' Bugs Bunny: Hare Extraordinaire
- Streaming - Boomerang App
- Streaming - HBO Max
- Streaming - Tubi
- Blu-ray - Looney Tunes Collector's Vault: Volume 3

Preceded by Operation: Rabbit	Bugs Bunny Cartoons; 1952	Succeeded by 14 Carrot Rabbit
