= Vienna Blood =

Vienna Blood may refer to

- Wiener Blut (waltz), by Johan Strauss II, Op.354
- Wiener Blut (operetta), named after the waltz
  - Vienna Blood (film), 1942 German film based on the operetta
- Vienna Blood (TV series), British-Austrian crime drama television series
