= Willoughby (Looney Tunes) =

Warner Bros. theatrical cartoon character

- Looney Tunes/Merrie Melodies character
- Willoughby and Bugs Bunny in The Heckling Hare
- First appearance: Of Fox and Hounds (1940)
- Last appearance: Foxy by Proxy (1952)
- Created by: Tex Avery
- Voiced by: Tex Avery (1940–1941); Kent Rogers (1941–1942); Mel Blanc (1942–1947); Tedd Pierce (1944); Stan Freberg (1952)

In-universe information
- Aliases: Willoughby; Rosebud; Sylvester
- Species: Dog
- Gender: Male

Willoughby is a minor animated cartoon character in the Warner Bros. Looney Tunes and Merrie Melodies series of cartoons. A lackadaisical hound dog, Willoughby is characterized by his below-average intelligence and overall gullibility. Creator Tex Avery based Willoughby on the character Lennie from John Steinbeck's 1937 novella Of Mice and Men.

Created during the golden age of American animation by Tex Avery, who would voice Willoughby from 1940's Of Fox and Hounds until 1941's The Heckling Hare, the character was later voiced by Kent Rogers (1941–1942), Mel Blanc (1942–1947), Tedd Pierce (1944), and Stan Freberg (1952). Willoughby has not appeared in any new media since 1952's Foxy by Proxy.

== History ==
Willoughby first appeared in the 1940 cartoon Of Fox and Hounds. He was created and voiced by Tex Avery. According to Chuck Jones, the character was based on Lennie, from Of Mice and Men (of which the title of Of Fox and Hounds is a knockoff). Critic Steven Hartley described this short as lacking in creativity, originality, excitement, and story construction, particularly compared to Avery's seminal earlier work A Wild Hare.

Willoughby later appears in other Warner Bros. animated shorts, including The Crackpot Quail (1941), The Heckling Hare (1941), and Nutty News (1942), as the lead dog of a fox hunting party. A fundamentally similar character, Laramore, appears in To Duck or Not to Duck (1943), albeit with a fully brown coat of fur. Willoughby's brief career was essentially over before the end of World War II.

Dogs similar to Willoughby in personality but visually distinct from him appeared in Porky's Bear Facts (1941), The Wabbit Who Came to Supper (1942), Ding Dog Daddy (1942), To Duck or Not to Duck (1943), A Corny Concerto (1943), Hare Ribbin' (1944), Hare Force (1944), Goofy Gophers (1947), and possibly Inki at the Circus (1947).

== Appearances ==
1. Of Fox and Hounds (1940)
2. The Crackpot Quail (1941)
3. The Heckling Hare (1941)
4. Nutty News (1942) (cameo in a B&W cartoon)
5. The Hep Cat (1942) (as Rosebud)
6. An Itch in Time (1943)
7. Foxy by Proxy (1952)

=== In other media ===
Willoughby was planned make a cameo appearance in the deleted scene "Acme's Funeral" from the 1988 film Who Framed Roger Rabbit. In that deleted scene, he appears with other animated characters scared when Casper appears at the funeral.
