= Daffy – The Commando =

1943 film by Isadore Freleng

- Title card
- Directed by: Isadore Freleng
- Story by: Michael Maltese
- Produced by: Leon Schlesinger
- Starring: Mel Blanc
- Music by: Carl W. Stalling
- Animation by: Ken Champin
- Color process: Technicolor
- Production company: Leon Schlesinger Productions
- Distributed by: Warner Bros. Pictures
- Release date: November 20, 1943
- Running time: 7 min
- Country: United States
- Language: English

Daffy – The Commando is a 1943 American animated comedy short film directed by Isadore Freleng. The cartoon was released on November 20, 1943. It is part of the Looney Tunes series and the 24th cartoon to feature Daffy Duck.

== Plot ==
Early one morning, somewhere in World War II-era Germany, Commander Von Vultur is pacing back and forth inside his bunker while fuming about how so many American commandos have managed to slip behind German enemy lines undetected. He receives a telegram from the "Gestinko Gestapo", threatening him with his 'ka-rear' if he lets 'vun' more 'kommando' through. Hearing an American warplane overhead, he calls in his batman – Schultz – whom he abuses by knocking him regularly over his helmet with a mallet. They run outside and use a searchlight to search for any more landing commandos and eventually spot one, who just happens to be Daffy floating down on a parachute, whilst singing Billy Bennett's "She Was Poor but She Was Honest" in a fake Cockney accent.

After a quick shout of "Put out those lights!" gets the searchlight turned off temporarily and allows him to land unseen, Daffy uses his fingers on the searchlight's lens to make shadow puppets of a canine and a dancing chorus trio of curvaceous showgirls on the clouds to distract the Germans before hiding behind an asbestos curtain. When Von Vultur opens the curtain, Daffy makes an ugly face, causing Von Vultur to run off frightened.

Back at Von Vultur's bunker, Daffy tricks him into telling him the time and presents him with a ticking time bomb "as a little token of our esteem". Von Vultur hands the bomb off to Schultz, who is literally blown through the roof. When Schultz falls back, Daffy (who was hiding underneath Schultz's helmet) stops Von Vultur from hitting Schultz over the head with a mallet, and instead hits him. Von Vultur chases Daffy to a telephone booth, where Daffy continues to make fun of him.

Daffy jumps in a plane, narrowly avoiding "a whole mess of Messerschmitts". Daffy is shot down by Von Vultur, his plane progressively disintegrating from back to front, eventually leaving just the engine and propeller), with Daffy still clinging to the controls. Daffy runs into what he believes is a tunnel where he can hide, but it turns out to be the barrel of a huge howitzer cannon. Daffy is shot out by Von Vultur. However, Daffy flies unharmed (as a "human cannonball") into Berlin, where (a rotoscoped) Fuehrer Adolf Hitler is giving a speech. Daffy whacks Hitler on the head with a mallet, causing Hitler to yell for Schultz.

== Voice cast ==
- Mel Blanc as Daffy Duck/Commander Von Vultur/Adolf Hitler

== Copyright status ==
This short is in the public domain due to United Artists (successor-in-interest to Associated Artists Productions) neglecting to renew the copyright in time.

== Home media ==
- VHS & Laserdisc 1989 - Bugs & Daffy: The Wartime Cartoons - MGM/UA Home Video
- Laserdisc 1992 - The Golden Age of Looney Tunes: Volume 2 - MGM/UA Home Video
- DVD 2008 - Looney Tunes Golden Collection: Volume 6 (restored) - Warner Home Video
- Blu-Ray 2026 - Looney Tunes Collector's Vault: Volume 3 (restored) - Warner Archive Collection

== See also ==
- Scrap Happy Daffy
- Herr Meets Hare
- List of World War II short films
- List of animated films in the public domain in the United States
- Daffy Duck filmography
- Looney Tunes and Merrie Melodies filmography (1940–1949)

Preceded by A Corny Concerto	Daffy Duck Cartoons; 1943	Succeeded by Tom Turk and Daffy
