= Scrap Happy Daffy =

1943 film by Frank Tashlin

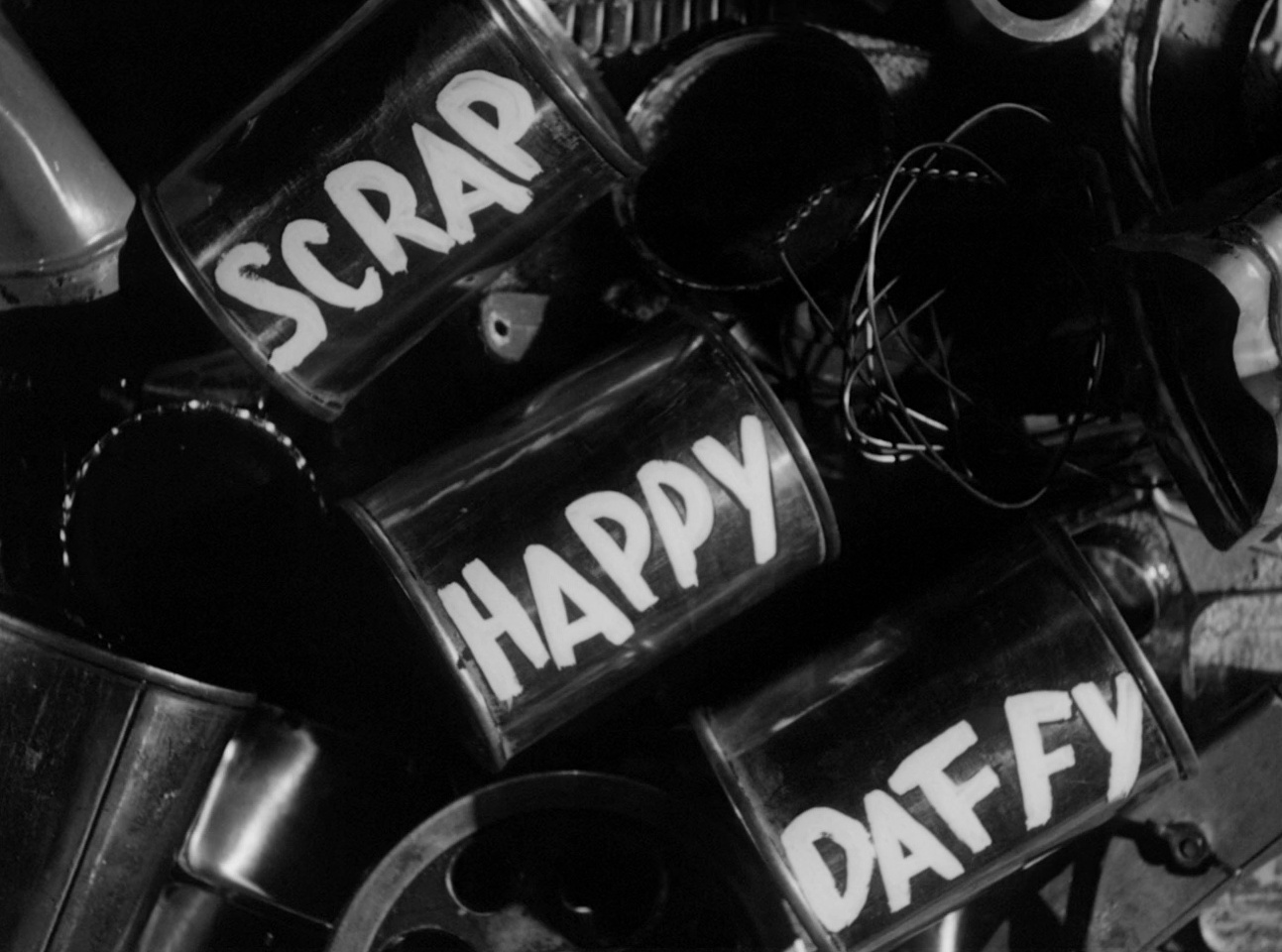
- Title card
- Directed by: Frank Tashlin
- Story by: Don Christensen
- Produced by: Leon Schlesinger
- Starring: Mel Blanc; Dorothy Lloyd; Tedd Pierce
- Music by: Carl W. Stalling
- Animation by: Art Davis
- Color process: Black-and-white
- Production company: Leon Schlesinger Productions
- Distributed by: Warner Bros. Pictures; The Vitaphone Corporation
- Release date: August 21, 1943
- Running time: 7:56
- Country: United States
- Language: English

Scrap Happy Daffy is a 1943 American animated comedy short film directed by Frank Tashlin. The cartoon was released on August 21, 1943. It is part of the Looney Tunes series and the 23rd cartoon to star Daffy Duck. It is the last cartoon to be written by Don Christensen, Norman McCabe's primary storyman who left after Tashlin rejoined the studio; it likewise resembles McCabe's cartoons with a focus on war-based humor. It is also Daffy Duck's final black-and-white appearance.

== Plot ==
Daffy is a guard at a scrap pile during World War II, encouraging Americans to "Get the tin out", "Get the brass out", "Get the iron out" and especially "Get the lead out". Singing We're in to Win, Daffy goes over the various things Americans can send to help with the war effort. He calls Hitler "Schikelgruber", which is the birth name of his father. However, Fuehrer Adolf Hitler who reads about Daffy's scrap pile helping to beat Benito Mussolini, is furious about this and responds to this by giving his men the following order: "Destroy that scrap pile!"

With the word out, a Nazi German submarine fires a torpedo — which has a billy goat inside — at the scrap pile. The goat immediately starts eating everything in sight. Daffy, hearing the noise, tries to find out what's making the noise. After temporarily pointing a rifle at a reflection of himself, Daffy finds the goat hiccupping with the garbage inside him and amiably offers him a glass of Alka-Seltzer. However, when Daffy sees the swastika on the goat’s collar, he starts messing with the goat. Temporarily getting the better of the goat, Daffy is almost undone when he tries to whack the goat with a mallet.

Daffy is ready to call it quits (saying "What I'd give for a can of spinach now", a reference to Popeye), but is encouraged by the ghosts of his ancestors who encamped at Valley Forge with George Washington, who explored with Daniel Boone, who sailed with John Paul Jones, and who stood in for Abraham Lincoln. Daffy's spirits back up when he realizes, "Americans don't give up, and I’m an American... duck!", and then he turns into "Super American" in a reference to Superman. Daffy flies after the goat, knocking him around. The goat makes a run for the submarine, but Daffy repels all bullets shot at him and starts yanking on the periscope. Just then, the scene changes to Daffy yanking on a fire hose and getting hosed down. Daffy wakes up, thinking it was all just a dream until he looks up at the Nazi submarine sitting on top of the scrap pile, where they tell Daffy, "Next time you dream, include us out!".

== Voice cast ==
- Mel Blanc as Daffy Duck / Adolf Hitler / Nazis / Goat / Daffy's Ancestors / Abraham Lincoln Duck
  - Dorothy Lloyd as Daffy's Wolf Whistle
- Tedd Pierce as Nazi Crowd on Scrap Pile

== Reception ==
Animator Eric Goldberg writes, "Despite the film's jingoistic nature, it still boasts all the hallmarks of a great Tashlin cartoon: Dynamic, stylized poses in the animation. Graphically styled layouts and backgrounds. And outrageous humor — we dissolve from the back end of a horse with a black tail to the forelock on Adolf's face; the goat is capable of doing a four-footed military goosestep. Scrap Happy Daffy is one of the classic World War II propaganda cartoons."

== Home media ==
- DVD 2007 - Air Force (extra) - Warner Home Video
- DVD 2007 - Looney Tunes Golden Collection: Volume 5 (restored) - Warner Home Video
- Blu-Ray & DVD 2014 - Looney Tunes Platinum Collection: Volume 3 (restored) - Warner Home Video
- Blu-Ray 2025 - The Hard Way (extra, restored) - Warner Archive Collection

== See also ==
- Daffy – The Commando
- Herr Meets Hare
- List of World War II short films
- List of animated films in the public domain in the United States
- Daffy Duck filmography
- Looney Tunes and Merrie Melodies filmography (1940–1949)

| Preceded by Porky Pig's Feat | Daffy Duck Cartoons; 1943 | Succeeded by A Corny Concerto |
