= Looney Tunes Collector's Vault =

Blu-ray collection

Looney Tunes Collector's Vault is a series of 2-disc Blu-rays from Warner Bros. Home Entertainment's Warner Archive division collecting various Looney Tunes and Merrie Melodies theatrical animated short subjects from Warner Bros. Cartoons. It is the spiritual successor to the Looney Tunes Collector's Choice Blu-ray series.

Unlike the previous Collector's Choice series - which only contained a single disc with 25 cartoons - Collector's Vault contains two discs with 50 cartoons (51 on Volume 2). Usually, the first disc would contain 25 shorts never-before-remastered on DVD or Blu-ray, while the second disc would contain 25 shorts previously released on DVD making their Blu-ray debut.

== Volume 1 ==
Looney Tunes Collector's Vault: Volume 1
- Blu-ray Disc cover
- Directed by: Chuck Jones; Friz Freleng; Robert McKimson; Tex Avery; Arthur Davis; Bob Clampett; Ben Hardaway; Cal Dalton
- Produced by: Leon Schlesinger; Eddie Selzer; John W. Burton
- Starring: Mel Blanc
- Music by: Carl Stalling; Milt Franklyn; William Lava
- Distributed by: Warner Bros. Home Entertainment
- Release date: June 17, 2025
- Country: United States
- Language: English

Looney Tunes Collector's Vault: Volume 1 was announced on March 13, 2025 and released on June 17, 2025. The first disc contains 24 shorts never-before-released on DVD or Blu-ray in restored form. In addition, Double or Mutton (1955), which was previously released as part of Collector's Choice: Volume 4, is also included on this set. According to Jerry Beck and George Feltenstein, this was a mistake; they apologized for its inclusion, and promised fans that the first disc of Volume 2 would include 26 cartoons to make up for the double dip.

Much like Collector's Choice: Volume 4, only three cartoons were specifically restored for this set: A Day at the Zoo (1939), Of Fox and Hounds (1940) and Each Dawn I Crow (1949). The other 21 new cartoons on disc one are all restorations previously done for HBO Max and MeTV, with Warner Archive correcting the Photoshopped title cards.

The second disc contains 25 cartoons previously restored and released on the various Looney Tunes Golden Collection and Looney Tunes Super Stars DVD sets, as well as The Essential Daffy Duck, but having not yet been released on Blu-ray. One cartoon, Tom Turk and Daffy (1944), received new, improved color grading from its original release on the Looney Tunes Super Stars' Porky & Friends: Hilarious Ham DVD. Disc two of Collector's Vault: Volume 1 did not carry over any of the audio commentaries and alternate audio tracks made for the Golden Collections.

Volume 1 contains the following cartoons:

=== Disc 1 ===
#	Title	Characters	Year	Director	Series
1	Bars and Stripes Forever		1939	Ben Hardaway, Cal Dalton	MM
2	Beauty and the Beast		1934	Friz Freleng	MM
3	A Day at the Zoo	Proto-Elmer	1939	Tex Avery	MM
4	The Dixie Fryer	Foghorn	1960	Robert McKimson	MM
5	Double or Mutton	Ralph and Sam	1955	Chuck Jones	LT
6	Each Dawn I Crow	Elmer	1949	Friz Freleng	MM
7	Easy Peckin's		1953	Robert McKimson	LT
8	Feather Dusted	Egghead Jr., Foghorn, Prissy	1955	Robert McKimson	MM
9	A Fox in a Fix		1951	Robert McKimson	MM
10	Good Night Elmer	Elmer	1940	Chuck Jones	MM
11	Goofy Gophers	Goofy Gophers, Bugs (cameo)	1947	Arthur Davis	LT
12	I'd Love to Take Orders From You		1936	Tex Avery	MM
13	A Kiddie's Kitty	Sylvester	1955	Friz Freleng	MM
14	Let It Be Me	Emily the Chicken	1936	Friz Freleng	MM
15	Of Fox and Hounds	Willoughby	1940	Tex Avery	MM
16	Quackodile Tears	Daffy	1962	Arthur Davis	MM
17	Ready, Woolen and Able	Ralph and Sam	1960	Chuck Jones	MM
18	Robin Hood Makes Good		1939	Chuck Jones	MM
19	The Squawkin' Hawk	Henery	1942	Chuck Jones	MM
20	Terrier-Stricken	Claude, Frisky Puppy	1952	Chuck Jones	MM
21	Tweet and Lovely	Hector, Sylvester, Tweety	1959	Friz Freleng	MM
22	Tweety's Circus	Sylvester, Tweety	1955	Friz Freleng	MM
23	Two's a Crowd	Claude, Frisky Puppy	1950	Chuck Jones	LT
24	Wild About Hurry	Wile E. Coyote and the Road Runner	1959	Chuck Jones	MM
25	Zip 'N Snort	Wile E. Coyote and the Road Runner	1961	Chuck Jones	MM

=== Disc 2 ===
#	Title	Characters	Year	Director	Series
1	Ain't She Tweet	Granny, Sylvester, Tweety	1952	Friz Freleng	LT
2	Banty Raids	Barnyard, Foghorn	1963	Robert McKimson	MM
3	Birth of a Notion	Daffy	1947	Robert McKimson	LT
4	Bye, Bye Bluebeard	Porky	1949	Arthur Davis	MM
5	Cat-Tails for Two	Speedy	1953	Robert McKimson	MM
6	Daffy Dilly	Daffy	1948	Chuck Jones	MM
7	Daffy Duck & Egghead	Daffy, Egghead	1938	Tex Avery	MM
8	Gee Whiz-z-z-z-z-z-z	Wile E. Coyote and the Road Runner	1956	Chuck Jones	LT
9	Gonzales' Tamales	Speedy, Sylvester	1957	Friz Freleng	LT
10	Hare Conditioned	Bugs	1945	Chuck Jones	LT
11	Hare Trigger	Bugs, Sam	1945	Friz Freleng	MM
12	Hare Trimmed	Bugs, Granny, Sam	1953	Friz Freleng	MM
13	Horton Hatches the Egg		1942	Bob Clampett	MM
14	Little Boy Boo	Egghead Jr., Foghorn, Prissy	1954	Robert McKimson	LT
15	Much Ado About Nutting		1953	Chuck Jones	MM
16	Odor-able Kitty	Pepé, Claude	1945	Chuck Jones	LT
17	Past Perfumance	Pepé	1955	Chuck Jones	MM
18	Porky's Duck Hunt	Daffy, Porky	1937	Tex Avery	LT
19	Rabbit Punch	Bugs, The Crusher	1948	Chuck Jones	MM
20	Red Riding Hoodwinked	Granny, Sylvester, Tweety	1955	Friz Freleng	LT
21	Rhapsody Rabbit	Bugs	1946	Friz Freleng	MM
22	Snow Business	Granny, Sylvester, Tweety	1953	Friz Freleng	LT
23	Tom Turk and Daffy	Daffy, Porky	1944	Chuck Jones	LT
24	Two Crows from Tacos	Jose and Manuel	1956	Friz Freleng	MM
25	Zoom and Bored	Wile E. Coyote and the Road Runner	1957	Chuck Jones	MM

== Volume 2 ==
Looney Tunes Collector's Vault: Volume 2
- Blu-ray Disc cover
- Directed by: Chuck Jones; Friz Freleng; Robert McKimson; Arthur Davis; Maurice Noble; Norman McCabe; Hawley Pratt; Tex Avery; Bob Clampett; Phil Monroe; Frank Tashlin; Richard Thompson
- Produced by: Leon Schlesinger; Eddie Selzer; John W. Burton; David H. DePatie
- Starring: Mel Blanc
- Music by: Norman Spencer; Carl Stalling; Milt Franklyn; William Lava
- Distributed by: Warner Bros. Home Entertainment
- Release date: March 24, 2026
- Country: United States
- Language: English

Looney Tunes Collector's Vault: Volume 2 was officially announced on December 23, 2025 and released on March 24, 2026, having been delayed from an original December 2025 release due to Warner Archive focusing its efforts on Tom and Jerry: The Golden Era Anthology.

The first disc contains 26 shorts never-before-released on DVD or Blu-ray in restored form, one more than the previous volume in order to make up for the mistaken inclusion of Double or Mutton (1955). Only four cartoons were restored specifically for this set: A-Lad-In His Lamp (1948), Ain't That Ducky (1945), The Daffy Duckaroo (1942), and I Taw a Putty Tat (1948). The other 22 cartoons on disc one - including Little Blabbermouse (1940), which was originally included as an unrestored bonus short on the Looney Tunes Mouse Chronicles: The Chuck Jones Collection Blu-ray and DVD sets - are all restorations previously done for HBO Max and MeTV, with Warner Archive correcting the Photoshopped title cards. In addition The Rattled Rooster (1948) had its original opening title sequence restored, as opposed to the Blue Ribbon reissue titles featured on previous releases.

As with the previous volume, the second disc contains 25 cartoons previously restored and released on the various Looney Tunes Golden Collection and Looney Tunes Super Stars DVD sets, but having not yet been released on Blu-ray. One cartoon, Hop and Go (1943) - which was previously released as an unrestored extra on Looney Tunes Golden Collection: Volume 6 - uses the restored print with the uncensored ending that first aired on MeTV+, with the stereo mix being removed. Disc two of Collector's Vault: Volume 2 also carried over five of the audio commentaries from the Golden Collection series.

Due to the politically incorrect nature of cartoons such as A-Lad-In His Lamp and The Daffy Duckaroo, both discs begin with the standard "products of their time" disclaimer - first introduced on the Looney Tunes Golden Collection: Volume 4 DVD set in 2006.

Volume 2 contains the following cartoons:

=== Disc 1 ===
#	Title	Characters	Year	Director	Series
1	A-Lad-In His Lamp	Bugs	1948	Robert McKimson	LT
2	Ain't That Ducky	Daffy	1945	Friz Freleng	LT
3	The Bird Came C. O. D.	Conrad	1942	Chuck Jones	MM
4	Bone Sweet Bone		1948	Arthur Davis	MM
5	Boston Quackie	Daffy, Porky	1957	Robert McKimson	LT
6	Boulevardier from the Bronx	Emily the Chicken	1936	Friz Freleng	MM
7	Country Boy		1935	Friz Freleng	MM
8	The Daffy Duckaroo	Daffy	1942	Norman McCabe	LT
9	Dr. Jerkyl's Hide	Spike and Chester, Sylvester	1954	Friz Freleng	LT
10	The EGGcited Rooster	Barnyard, Foghorn, Henery	1952	Robert McKimson	MM
11	Fastest with the Mostest	Wile E. Coyote and the Road Runner	1960	Chuck Jones	LT
12	Fowl Weather	Granny, Hector, Sylvester, Tweety	1953	Friz Freleng	MM
13	I Taw a Putty Tat	Sylvester, Tweety	1948	Friz Freleng	MM
14	I Gopher You	Goofy Gophers	1954	Friz Freleng	MM
15	I Was a Teenage Thumb		1963	Chuck Jones, Maurice Noble	MM
16	Little Blabbermouse	Little Blabbermouse	1940	Friz Freleng	MM
17	Mother Was a Rooster	Barnyard, Foghorn	1962	Robert McKimson	MM
18	Pests for Guests	Elmer, Goofy Gophers	1955	Friz Freleng	MM
19	The Rattled Rooster		1948	Arthur Davis	LT
20	A Sheep in the Deep	Ralph and Sam	1962	Chuck Jones, Maurice Noble	MM
21	Sock a Doodle Do	Barnyard, Foghorn	1952	Robert McKimson	LT
22	A Street Cat Named Sylvester	Granny, Hector, Sylvester, Tweety	1953	Friz Freleng	LT
23	To Itch His Own		1958	Chuck Jones	MM
24	A Waggily Tale		1958	Friz Freleng	LT
25	Woolen Under Where	Ralph and Sam	1963	Phil Monroe, Richard Thompson	MM
26	Zoom at the Top	Wile E. Coyote and the Road Runner	1962	Chuck Jones, Maurice Noble	MM

=== Disc 2 ===
#	Title	Characters	Year	Director	Series
1	Awful Orphan	Charlie, Porky	1949	Chuck Jones	MM
2	A Bird in a Guilty Cage	Sylvester, Tweety	1952	Friz Freleng	LT
3	Bowery Bugs	Bugs	1949	Arthur Davis	MM
4	Claws for Alarm	Porky, Sylvester	1954	Chuck Jones	MM
5	Crowing Pains	Barnyard, Foghorn, Henery, Sylvester	1947	Robert McKimson	LT
6	Frigid Hare	Bugs, Playboy	1949	Chuck Jones	MM
7	Hare Remover	Bugs, Elmer	1946	Frank Tashlin	MM
8	The Heckling Hare	Bugs, Willoughby	1941	Tex Avery	MM
9	Hop and Go		1943	Norman McCabe	LT
10	Hyde and Hare	Bugs	1955	Friz Freleng	LT
11	Jumpin' Jupiter	Porky, Sylvester	1955	Chuck Jones	MM
12	The Last Hungry Cat	Sylvester, Tweety	1961	Friz Freleng, Hawley Pratt	MM
13	Mexican Boarders	Slowpoke, Speedy, Sylvester	1962	Friz Freleng, Hawley Pratt	LT
14	Mouse Menace	Porky	1946	Arthur Davis	LT
15	Odor of the Day	Pepé	1948	Arthur Davis	LT
16	Often an Orphan	Charlie, Porky	1949	Chuck Jones	MM
17	The Pest That Came to Dinner	Porky	1948	Arthur Davis	LT
18	Ready, Set, Zoom!	Wile E. Coyote and the Road Runner	1955	Chuck Jones	LT
19	Scent-imental Over You	Pepé	1947	Chuck Jones	LT
20	Stop! Look! And Hasten!	Wile E. Coyote and the Road Runner	1954	Chuck Jones	MM
21	To Beep or Not to Beep	Wile E. Coyote and the Road Runner	1963	Chuck Jones, Maurice Noble	MM
22	Wagon Heels	Porky	1945	Bob Clampett	MM
23	Whoa, Be-Gone!	Wile E. Coyote and the Road Runner	1958	Chuck Jones	MM
24	Wise Quackers	Daffy, Elmer	1949	Friz Freleng	LT
25	You Were Never Duckier	Daffy, Henery	1948	Chuck Jones	MM

==== Special features ====
- Audio commentaries
  - Michael Barrier on Bowery Bugs
  - Greg Ford on The Heckling Hare, Mexican Boarders, Stop! Look! And Hasten!
  - Eric Goldberg on You Were Never Duckier

== Volume 3 ==
Looney Tunes Collector's Vault: Volume 3
- Blu-ray Disc cover
- Directed by: Friz Freleng; Chuck Jones; Robert McKimson; Frank Tashlin; Rudolf Ising; Tex Avery; Arthur Davis; Hugh Harman; Abe Levitow; Hawley Pratt
- Produced by: Leon Schlesinger; Eddie Selzer; John W. Burton
- Starring: Mel Blanc
- Music by: Frank Marsales; Bernard B. Brown; Norman Spencer; Carl Stalling; Milt Franklyn
- Distributed by: Warner Bros. Home Entertainment
- Release date: September 8, 2026
- Country: United States
- Language: English

Looney Tunes Collector's Vault: Volume 3 was announced on July 9, 2026 and released on September 8, 2026.

The first disc contains 25 cartoons never-before-released on DVD or Blu-ray in restored form, including both Sinkin' in the Bathtub (1930) and Lady, Play Your Mandolin! (1931), the first Looney Tunes and Merrie Melodies cartoons, respectively. Only five cartoons were restored specifically for this set: A Feather in His Hare (1948), Horse Hare (1960), Nothing But the Tooth (1948), the aforementioned Sinkin' in the Bathtub - which was previously released as an unrestored extra on Looney Tunes Golden Collection: Volume 3 and Looney Tunes Platinum Collection: Volume 2, and Slightly Daffy (1944). The other 20 cartoons on disc one, including some of those initially released as unrestored extras on other official Looney Tunes DVD and Blu-ray sets, are all restorations previously done for HBO Max and MeTV.

As with the first two volumes, the second disc contains 25 cartoons previously restored and released on the various Looney Tunes Golden Collection and Looney Tunes Super Stars DVD sets, but having not yet been released on Blu-ray. Similar to Volume 2, disc two of Volume 3 carried over five of the audio commentaries from the Golden Collection DVDs.

Volume 3 contains the following cartoons:

=== Disc 1 ===
#	Title	Characters	Year	Director	Series
1	Billboard Frolics		1935	Friz Freleng	MM
2	The Country Mouse		1935	Friz Freleng	MM
3	Dog Gone Modern	Two Curious Puppies	1939	Chuck Jones	MM
4	Don't Axe Me	Barnyard, Daffy, Elmer	1958	Robert McKimson	MM
5	Don't Look Now		1936	Tex Avery	MM
6	Feather Bluster	Barnyard, Foghorn	1958	Robert McKimson	MM
7	A Feather in His Hare	Bugs	1948	Chuck Jones	LT
8	The Gay Anties		1947	Friz Freleng	MM
9	Horse Hare	Bugs, Sam	1960	Friz Freleng	LT
10	Joe Glow, the Firefly		1941	Chuck Jones	LT
11	Lady, Play Your Mandolin!	Foxy	1931	Rudolf Ising	MM
12	The Lyin' Mouse		1937	Friz Freleng	MM
13	Mice Follies	The Honey-Mousers	1960	Robert McKimson	LT
14	My Green Fedora		1935	Friz Freleng	MM
15	Nothing But the Tooth	Porky	1948	Arthur Davis	MM
16	Of Thee I Sting		1946	Friz Freleng	LT
17	A Pizza Tweety-Pie	Granny, Sylvester, Tweety	1958	Friz Freleng	LT
18	Shake Your Powder Puff		1934	Friz Freleng	MM
19	Sinkin' in the Bathtub	Bosko	1930	Hugh Harman, Rudolf Ising	LT
20	Sleepy Time Possum		1951	Robert McKimson	MM
21	Slightly Daffy	Daffy, Porky	1944	Friz Freleng	MM
22	A Star Is Hatched	Emily the Chicken	1938	Friz Freleng	MM
23	Tree Cornered Tweety	Sylvester, Tweety	1956	Friz Freleng	MM
24	Trick or Tweet	Sylvester, Tweety	1959	Friz Freleng	MM
25	Tweet and Sour	Granny, Sylvester, Tweety	1956	Friz Freleng	LT

=== Disc 2 ===
#	Title	Characters	Year	Director	Series
1	Ballot Box Bunny	Bugs, Sam	1951	Friz Freleng	MM
2	Boobs in the Woods	Daffy, Porky	1950	Robert McKimson	LT
3	Booby Hatched		1944	Frank Tashlin	LT
4	Case of the Missing Hare	Bugs	1942	Chuck Jones	MM
5	Conrad the Sailor	Conrad, Daffy	1942	Chuck Jones	MM
6	Daffy – The Commando	Daffy	1943	Friz Freleng	LT
7	Duck Soup to Nuts	Daffy, Porky	1944	Friz Freleng	LT
8	Fox-Terror	Barnyard, Foghorn	1957	Robert McKimson	MM
9	Foxy by Proxy	Bugs, Willoughby	1952	Friz Freleng	MM
10	Fresh Airedale		1945	Chuck Jones	MM
11	Goldimouse and the Three Cats	Sylvester, Sylvester Jr.	1960	Friz Freleng	LT
12	Herr Meets Hare	Bugs	1945	Friz Freleng	MM
13	Holiday for Shoestrings		1946	Friz Freleng	MM
14	Hollywood Daffy	Daffy	1946	Hawley Pratt	MM
15	I Got Plenty of Mutton		1944	Frank Tashlin	LT
16	Mississippi Hare	Bugs, Colonel Shuffle	1949	Chuck Jones	LT
17	Mutiny on the Bunny	Bugs, Sam	1950	Friz Freleng	LT
18	My Favorite Duck	Daffy, Porky	1942	Chuck Jones	LT
19	Pizzicato Pussycat		1955	Friz Freleng	MM
20	Puss n' Booty		1943	Frank Tashlin	LT
21	Rabbit's Kin	Bugs, Pete Puma	1952	Robert McKimson	MM
22	Really Scent	Pepé, Penelope	1959	Abe Levitow	MM
23	Stage Door Cartoon	Bugs, Elmer	1944	Friz Freleng	MM
24	A Star Is Bored	Bugs, Daffy, Elmer, Sam	1956	Friz Freleng	LT
25	The Windblown Hare	Bugs	1949	Robert McKimson	LT

==== Special features ====
- Audio commentaries
  - Greg Ford on Case of the Missing Hare, Fresh Airedale, and Herr Meets Hare
  - Eric Goldberg on Mississippi Hare
  - Jerry Beck on My Favorite Duck

== See also ==
- Looney Tunes and Merrie Melodies filmography
  - Looney Tunes and Merrie Melodies filmography (1930–1939)
  - Looney Tunes and Merrie Melodies filmography (1940–1949)
  - Looney Tunes and Merrie Melodies filmography (1950–1959)
  - Looney Tunes and Merrie Melodies filmography (1960–1969)
  - Looney Tunes and Merrie Melodies filmography (1970–present)
