= A Feather in His Hare =

1948 animated short film directed by Chuck Jones

- Directed by: Charles M. Jones
- Story by: Michael Maltese; Tedd Pierce
- Starring: Mel Blanc; Michael Maltese
- Music by: Carl Stalling
- Animation by: Ken Harris; Phil Monroe; Ben Washam; Lloyd Vaughan
- Layouts by: Robert Gribbroek
- Backgrounds by: Peter Alvarado
- Color process: Technicolor
- Production company: Warner Bros. Cartoons
- Distributed by: Warner Bros. Pictures
- Release date: February 7, 1948
- Running time: 7 minutes (one reel)
- Language: English

A Feather in His Hare is a 1948 Warner Bros. Looney Tunes animated short, directed by Chuck Jones. Completed in 1946, the short was originally released on February 7, 1948. The title is a pun on "hair".

The short would be the first Bugs Bunny cartoon directed by Chuck Jones that used Robert McKimson's design for Bugs instead of the version Jones used from Hold the Lion, Please to Hair-Raising Hare, which was a shorter and slightly different version of the character.

== Plot ==
The plot is a twist on the usual Elmer-chasing-Bugs cartoon, with the bunny's pursuer this time being a dopey Indian. The Indian's body shape, along with the glasses he wears, suggest that he is meant to be a parody of Ed Wynn, although the voice does not match.

Most of the episode is spent with Bugs getting vengeance by "thinking up some more deviltry for that Apache." At the climactic moment, Bugs, looking at the camera, says "Imagine this guy! Just who does he think he is to be chasin' me?", the Indian answers, holding Bugs at arrow-point, "Me? Me last Mohican!". "Last of the Mohicans, eh?", Bugs says, "Well, look, Geronimo, cast your eyes skywards." Looking up, he sees several storks carrying infant versions of the goofy Indian, and passes out.

Bugs laughs himself silly, however his laughter is short-lived when he happens to cast his own eyes skyward, and sees hundreds of storks carrying infant bunnies, who shout, in unison, "Eh, what's up, Pop?" Bugs then passes out, falling on top of the unconscious Indian. Iris-out.

== Voice cast ==
- Mel Blanc as Bugs Bunny, Baby Rabbits
- Michael Maltese as Indian (uncredited)

Indian's Screams are provided by Mel Blanc

== Controversy ==
This cartoon was one of 12 pulled from Cartoon Network's annual June Bugs marathon in 2001 by order of AOL Time Warner due to ethnic stereotyping.

== Home media ==
The short is available on disc 1 of the Looney Tunes Collector's Vault: Volume 3 Blu-ray set.

== See also ==
- Bugs Bunny filmography
- Looney Tunes and Merrie Melodies filmography (1940–1949)

Preceded by Gorilla My Dreams	Bugs Bunny Cartoons; 1948	Succeeded by Rabbit Punch
