= The Heckling Hare =

1941 film by Fred Avery

- Title card
- Directed by: Fred Avery
- Story by: Michael Maltese
- Produced by: Leon Schlesinger
- Starring: Mel Blanc; Fred Avery
- Music by: Carl W. Stalling
- Animation by: Bob McKimson
- Color process: Technicolor
- Production company: Leon Schlesinger Productions
- Distributed by: Warner Bros. Pictures
- Release date: July 5, 1941
- Running time: 7 min
- Country: United States
- Language: English

The Heckling Hare is a 1941 American animated comedy short film directed by Fred Avery. It is part of the Merrie Melodies series, the ninth cartoon to feature Bugs Bunny and the third cartoon to feature Willoughby. Its production was troubled, notoriously for causing a dispute between Avery and producer Leon Schlesinger, which motivated Avery to leave for Metro-Goldwyn-Mayer. The last, All This and Rabbit Stew, was produced before this film.

== Plot ==
Dimwitted Willoughby is in search for a rabbit, and happens to find Bugs Bunny inside of his hole. Willoughby digs in the hole, but Bugs leaves from another hole nearby. Realizing the rabbit, Willoughby pursues after the rabbit but only manages to make a fool out of himself.

After finding Bugs in a different hole, he notices the rabbit mimicking his actions to the point where he continues after Bugs stops and hits him with a bat. Bugs swims inside a nearby lake; Willoughby tries to dive after him but lands on a shallow surface. Bugs travels through a log that Willoughby slams on, and Bugs rides atop of the dog after he leaves the water. Bugs scratches the rear of the mutt and smooches him. Bugs hops into a tree with a hole on both sides and tricks Willoughby into thinking he killed Bugs with a tomato. The mournful dog tries to give some flowers to Bugs' hole, where Bugs once again smooches the dog.

Willoughby digs after the hole in a fury, only to realize that he was digging under a cliff. He nearly falls, but saves himself and says he needs to be more careful. Just as he says that, Willoughby walks off the cliff nearby. Bugs taunts the dog, only to fall into the hole that Willoughby dug out. They fall but manage to brake in midair before landing safely.

== Voice cast ==
- Mel Blanc as Bugs Bunny
- Kent Rogers as Willoughby the Dog

== Production ==
This is the cartoon that led to Avery leaving Warner Bros. and moving to MGM. The final gag of this cartoon originally had Bugs and Willoughby falling off three cliffs, with Bugs telling the audience "Well! Here we go again!" during the pair's second and third trip down. Schlesinger intervened, for reasons which are not known with certainty.

According to Martha Sigall, Schlesinger found the second fall to be too repetitious and objected to its inclusion on those grounds. He instructed Avery to cut it, but Avery insisted that it should remain. Schlesinger simply overruled him as the boss, resulting in the ending being cut down regardless to Avery's insistence. Karl F. Cohen also suggests that Schlesinger found it inappropriate of an ending which suggests that Bugs gets killed. From Schlesinger's point of view, the dispute was over his right to do as he pleased with the films he was paying for. From Avery's point of view, the dispute was over artistic interference.

It was also claimed that Bugs' line was "Hold on to your hats, folks. Here we go again!", referring to a dirty joke that was then in circulation. However, this line does not appear in the film's dialogue transcript; a similar line had been used in Daffy Duck and Egghead (1938, coincidentally also directed by Avery) where Daffy Duck tells the audience, "Hold your seats, folks, here we go again!" just before launching into his own take on The Merry-Go-Round Broke Down.

The film was edited so that the characters only fall off a cliff once. After Bugs and Willoughby fall through the sky in a lengthy sequence, they "put on the brakes" and make a soft, feet-first landing on the ground. Bugs says to the audience, "N'yah, fooled you, didn't we?!" The dog follows with, "Yeah!" just as the cartoon fades out. Willoughby's line and the fade out to the end card are usually cut in TV versions (mostly those shown on the Ted Turner-owned cable networks TBS, TNT, Cartoon Network, and Boomerang) to cover up the fact that the cartoon had been edited in such an abrupt manner prior to release in theaters.

The Heckling Hare was not the only subject matter Avery feuded with Schlesinger over at the time, as Schlesinger also rejected his idea to create a series of shorts featuring live-action animals with animated mouths. Avery was promptly suspended for four weeks with no pay, resulting in a disgruntled Avery to walk out from the studio for good. On July 2, 1941, the quarrel was reported in an article for The Hollywood Reporter, citing the ending of The Heckling Hare for his reason of departure. During his suspension, Avery was hired by Jerry Fairbanks at Paramount Pictures where he directed the Speaking of Animals shorts (beginning with Down on the Farm) and later left for MGM. Avery's unit would subsequently be taken over by Bob Clampett upon his departure.

== Home media ==
- VHS 1988 - Cartoon Moviestars: Bugs Bunny Classics - MGM/UA Home Video
- Laserdisc 1990 - Cartoon Moviestars: Bugs Bunny Classics - MGM/UA Home Video
- VHS 1990 - Bugs Bunny Collection: The Very Best of Bugs - MGM/UA Home Video
- Laserdisc 1991 - The Golden Age of Looney Tunes: Volume 1 - MGM/UA Home Video
- VHS 1992 - The Golden Age of Looney Tunes: Vol. 7 - Bugs Bunny by Each Director - MGM/UA Home Video
- VHS 1999 - Looney Tunes: The Collector's Edition, Vol. 8 - Tex-Book Avery - Warner Home Video/Columbia House
- DVD 2004 - Looney Tunes Golden Collection: Volume 2 (restored) - Warner Home Video
- DVD 2005 - Looney Tunes Golden Collection: Volume 3 (extra, unrestored as part of What's Up Doc? A Salute to Bugs Bunny TV Special) - Warner Home Video
- DVD 2014 - Looney Tunes Spotlight Collection: Volume 8 (restored) - Warner Home Video
- Blu-Ray 2025 - Out of the Fog (extra, restored) - Warner Archive Collection
- Blu-Ray 2026 - Looney Tunes Collector's Vault: Volume 2 (restored) - Warner Archive Collection

== See also ==
- Bugs Bunny filmography
- Looney Tunes and Merrie Melodies filmography (1940–1949)

== Sources ==
- Cohen, Karl F. (2004), "Censorship of Theatrical Animation", Forbidden Animation: Censored Cartoons and Blacklisted Animators in America, McFarland & Company, ISBN 978-0786420322
- Sigall, Martha (2005). "The Boys of Termite Terrace". Living Life Inside the Lines: Tales from the Golden Age of Animation. University Press of Mississippi. ISBN 9781578067497.

Preceded by Hiawatha's Rabbit Hunt	Bugs Bunny Cartoons; 1941	Succeeded by All This and Rabbit Stew
