= Tom Turk and Daffy =

- Title card
- Directed by: Charles M. Jones
- Story by: Michael Maltese; Tedd Pierce
- Produced by: Leon Schlesinger
- Starring: Mel Blanc; Billy Bletcher
- Music by: Carl W. Stalling
- Animation by: Ken Harris; Ben Washam; Robert Cannon; Rudy Larriva
- Layouts by: Bernyce Polifka
- Backgrounds by: Bernyce Polifka
- Color process: Technicolor
- Production company: Leon Schlesinger Productions
- Distributed by: Warner Bros. Pictures
- Release date: February 12, 1944
- Running time: 7:17
- Country: United States
- Language: English

Tom Turk and Daffy is a 1944 Warner Bros. Looney Tunes cartoon directed by Chuck Jones. The cartoon was released on February 12, 1944, and stars Porky Pig, Daffy Duck and, in his debut, Tom Turk.

The voices of Daffy and Porky were provided by Mel Blanc, while Tom Turk was voiced by Billy Bletcher.

== Plot ==
In winter, Daffy Duck is building a snowman when he hears distant gunfire. A turkey named Tom Turk is on the run from hunter Porky Pig, dressed as a stereotypical Pilgrim armed with a blunderbuss. Daffy reluctantly agrees to Tom's plea for a place to hide, and after violently stuffing Tom in various places (then changing his mind), Daffy settles on inside his snowman. Porky arrives, and while Daffy initially denies seeing Tom, he slowly loses resolve as Porky describes the delicious turkey dinner Porky was planning and soon rats Tom out. In revenge, Tom rearranges Daffy's tail feathers to resemble a turkey, which tricks Porky into pursuing Daffy as his dinner.

After a surreal snowball fight and some gags involving water from a nearby river that freezes when thrown, Daffy uses some of this water to create a toll bridge, which Porky crosses and pays. Realizing he has been played for a "dunce, a dope and a sucker," Porky chases Daffy back to the original snowman, now being worked upon by Tom. In a reversal of the opening of the film, Daffy begs Tom to help him hide, and Tom obliges with a similar but longer sequence of violently stuffing Daffy in various places.

== Cast ==
- Mel Blanc as Daffy Duck / Porky Pig
- Billy Bletcher as Tom Turk

== Production notes ==
- Michael Maltese and Tedd Pierce are both the writers of the short, and are credited here as "The Staff".
- Tom Turk later reappeared in the 1949 Daffy Duck short Holiday for Drumsticks, albeit redesigned and having a different voice.
- This is the final Chuck Jones short that was animated by Rudy Larriva.
- Tom refers to Daffy as a "Quisling" after he reveals where Tom was hiding to Porky. The term is based on the Norwegian Prime Minister Vidkun Quisling, who sold out to the Nazis and would be synonymous with "traitor" and "Benedict Arnold" forever after. His betrayal towards the Norwegians resulted in a relatively bloodless invasion of Norway by the Nazis while Quisling himself is granted preferential custody of his occupied nation.

== Home media ==
- VHS 1986 - Viddy-Oh! For Kids Cartoon Festivals: Porky Pig and Daffy Duck Cartoon Festival Featuring "Tick Tock Tuckered" - MGM/UA Home Video
- VHS 1986 - Viddy-Oh! For Kids Cartoon Festivals: Porky Pig Cartoon Festival Featuring "Tom Turk and Daffy" - MGM/UA Home Video
- VHS 1990 – Cartoon Moviestars: Porky Pig and Company - MGM/UA Home Video
- Laserdisc 1993 – The Golden Age of Looney Tunes: Volume 4 - MGM/UA Home Video
- DVD 2012 – Looney Tunes Super Stars' Porky & Friends: Hilarious Ham (restored) - Warner Home Video
- Blu-Ray 2025 – Looney Tunes Collector's Vault: Volume 1 (restored) Warner Archive Collection

== See also ==
- Looney Tunes and Merrie Melodies filmography (1940–1949)
- Daffy Duck filmography
- Porky Pig filmography
- Jerky Turkey

Preceded by A Corny Concerto	Porky Pig Cartoons; 1943	Succeeded by Tick Tock Tuckered

Preceded by Daffy – The Commando	Daffy Duck Cartoons; 1943	Succeeded by Tick Tock Tuckered
