= Rabbit Punch =

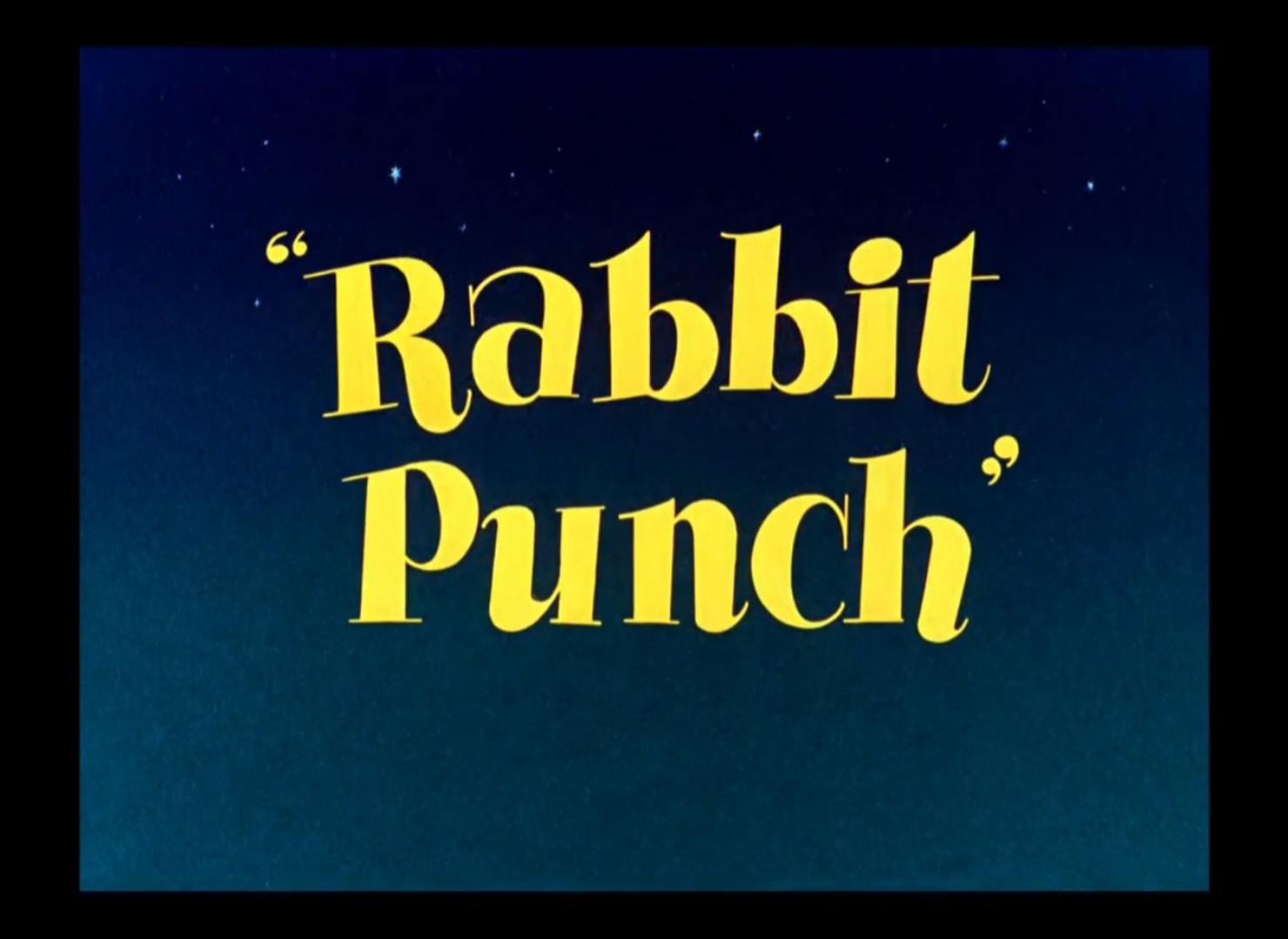
- Title card
- Directed by: Chuck Jones
- Story by: Tedd Pierce; Michael Maltese
- Starring: Mel Blanc
- Music by: Carl Stalling
- Animation by: Phil Monroe; Ken Harris; Lloyd Vaughan; Ben Washam
- Layouts by: Robert Gribbroek
- Backgrounds by: Peter Alvarado
- Color process: Technicolor
- Production company: Warner Bros. Cartoons
- Distributed by: Warner Bros. Pictures
- Release date: April 10, 1948
- Running time: 7:40
- Language: English

Rabbit Punch is a 1948 Warner Bros. Merrie Melodies theatrical cartoon. The short was released on April 10, 1948 and features Bugs Bunny. The work features a boxing match between "Battling McGook" (identified as "The Crusher" in subsequent cartoons) and Bugs Bunny. The script reuses several gags from Baseball Bugs, which also had contributions from Michael Maltese, but was directed by Friz Freleng.

== Plot ==
A boxing match begins between the Champ "Battling McGook" and the Challenger "Dyspectic McBlaster". The Champ immediately knocks out the Challenger with a few punches. The Champ, instead of letting the match end, picks the Challenger back up and continues punching him in various ways. Bugs Bunny, displeased with this, heckles the Champ from outside the stadium.

The Champ, after hearing Bugs, throws him into the ring for a boxing match. At first, Bugs, having no experience, is punched back to his corner by the Champ. After this happens three times, Bugs begins using strategy to win. Afterward, the two begin cheating and the match changes from boxing to wrestling. The match ends at round 110 when the Champ ties Bugs to a railroad track assembled in the ring and tries to run him over with a train. The film breaks just as Bugs is about to be run over. Bugs walks onto a white screen and tells the audience that the film is unable to continue (repeating a gag used in My Favorite Duck), but it didn't break, revealing a pair of scissors.

== Home media ==
The short was released on disc 1 of the Looney Tunes Golden Collection: Volume 3 DVD set, and on disc 2 of the Looney Tunes Collector's Vault: Volume 1 Blu-ray set.

== See also ==
- Bugs Bunny filmography
- Looney Tunes and Merrie Melodies filmography (1940–1949)

Preceded by A Feather in His Hare	Bugs Bunny Cartoons; 1948	Succeeded by Buccaneer Bunny
