= The Bird Came C. O. D. =

1942 film by Charles M. Jones

- Title card
- Directed by: Charles M. Jones
- Story by: Rich Hogan (uncredited)
- Produced by: Leon Schlesinger
- Music by: Carl W. Stalling
- Animation by: Philip de Lara
- Color process: Technicolor
- Production company: Leon Schlesinger Productions
- Distributed by: Warner Bros. Pictures
- Release date: January 17, 1942
- Running time: 7 min
- Country: United States
- Language: English

The Bird Came C. O. D. is a 1942 American animated comedy short film directed by Charles M. Jones. The cartoon was released on January 17, 1942. It is part of the Merrie Melodies series and the first appearance of Conrad Cat.

== Plot ==
Conrad Cat works for the Arctic Palm Co. and is instructed to deliver a palm tree to a theater. He is hindered by his tail and is somehow thrown out of the theater by his own stupidity. He finally enters and after various mishaps, he arrives and replaces a wilted palm.

Before Conrad leaves, he is distracted by a magician's top hat intended for a performance. He aggravates the bird from Stage Fright, who continuously pummels him until he lands in the orchestra pit and destroys all of the instruments. He decides to leave with the wilted palm, but is sent by falling bricks into a room where he finds five of the same angry birds.

== Home media ==
This short is available on disc 1 of the Looney Tunes Collector's Vault: Volume 2 Blu-ray set.
