= Porky Pig's Feat =

1943 film by Frank Tashlin

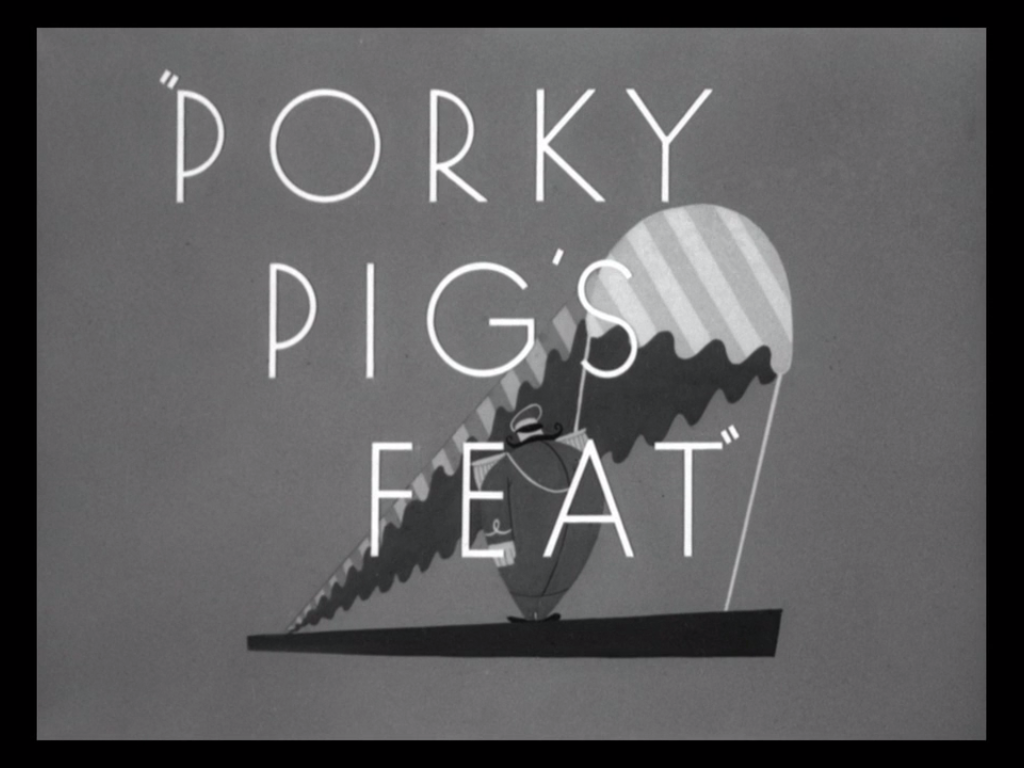
- Title card
- Directed by: Frank Tashlin
- Story by: Melvin Millar
- Produced by: Leon Schlesinger
- Starring: Mel Blanc
- Music by: Carl W. Stalling
- Animation by: Phil Monroe
- Color process: Black-and-white
- Production company: Leon Schlesinger Productions
- Distributed by: Warner Bros. Pictures
- Release date: July 17, 1943
- Running time: 8 min
- Country: United States
- Language: English

Porky Pig's Feat is a 1943 American animated comedy short film directed by Frank Tashlin. It was released on July 17, 1943. It is part of the Looney Tunes series, the 102nd cartoon to star Porky Pig and the 22nd cartoon to star Daffy Duck. Bugs Bunny notably makes a cameo at the end, the last in his three black-and-white cartoons, all but one of which were cameo appearances. It is also Porky Pig's final black-and-white appearance, after spending the past 7 years mainly headlining the studio's black-and-white cartoons.

The cartoon is the first to be directed by Tashlin in his third tenure at the studio, as he had left after directing You're an Education (1938) and left for Disney, where he helped instigate the Disney animators' strike, as well as Screen Gems where he worked as a director, producer and writer. It also contains the first use of the music "Powerhouse", composed by Raymond Scott, in a cartoon, which would become heavily associated with the series.

== Plot ==
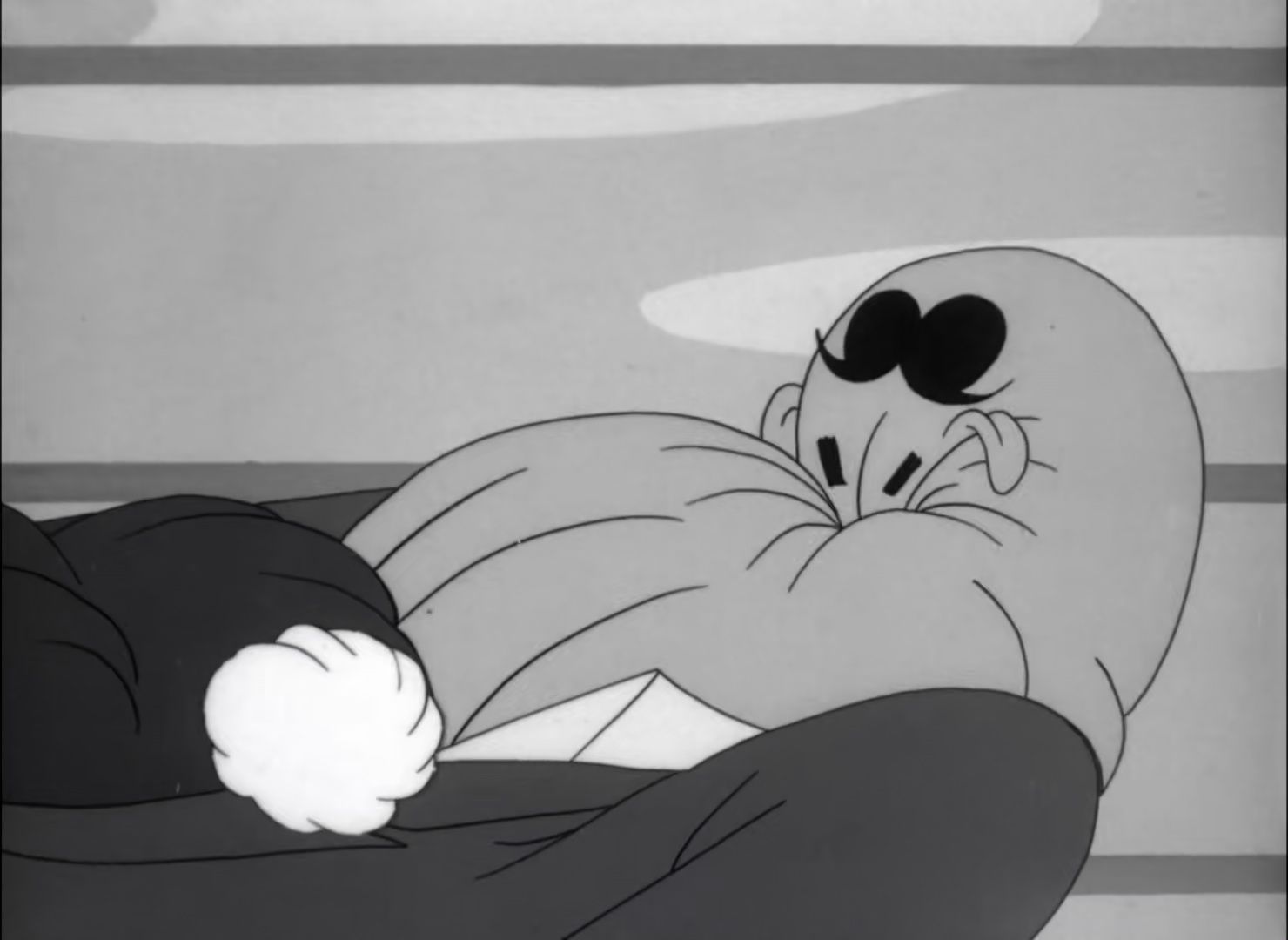
Daffy pushes the manager's face inwards and calls him Pruneface.

The cartoon centers around Porky Pig and Daffy Duck's attempts to escape the Broken Arms Hotel manager without paying their bill (on which they are charged for every luxury, including breathing air, sunshine, and goodwill); they are trying to evade payment because Daffy lost all their money playing craps.

Despite numerous methods to elude the hotel manager (using the elevator, throwing the manager down a large spiral staircase, knotting sheets and rappelling from a window, swinging from a window to a building across the street), he gets the upper hand every time and eventually locks them in a room, in shackles, where they will stay until they pay up. Winter arrives and Daffy is beginning to lose his sanity. Porky (who has written "Porky Loves Petunia" on the wall, and is keeping track of their incarceration with prison-style graffiti) says, "Gosh, if Bugs Bunny was only here." Daffy concurs and decides to call Bugs for advice, as the trickster is famous for being able to get out of seemingly inescapable situations. Once on the phone, Bugs asks Daffy if they have tried the various methods of escape which they did indeed try. Daffy replies "Yes" each time and adds, "We tried all those ways." The door to the next room opens and Bugs is seen in shackles. He says, "Ahh, don't work, do they?", implying that he is in the same predicament as Porky and Daffy.

== Voice cast ==
- Mel Blanc as Porky Pig / Daffy Duck / Hotel Manager / Black Gambler / Bugs Bunny

== Reception ==
Animator Mark Mayerson writes, "Frank Tashlin had a very personal style of cartoon direction. He chose unusual camera angles and was never afraid to cut shots quickly for humorous effect. His characters were often posed in 'extreme' (exaggerated) positions, and these poses were held far longer than other directors would dare. Tashlin's direction is so flamboyant that it is as entertaining to watch as the characters. Porky Pig's Feat is fairly standard from a story standpoint, typical of Warner Bros. cartoons that pit characters against each other. It's how Tashlin tells this story that makes it so memorable."

== Home media ==
- VHS 1992 - Daffy Duck: Tales from the Duckside (computer colorized)
- Laserdisc 1993 - Ham on Wry: The Porky Pig Laser Collection (computer colorized)
- DVD 2005 - Looney Tunes Golden Collection: Volume 3 (restored, black and white)
- Blu-Ray & DVD 2014 - Looney Tunes Platinum Collection: Volume 3 (restored, black and white)
- DVD 2017 - Porky Pig 101 (restored, black and white)

== See also ==
- Bugs Bunny filmography
- Daffy Duck filmography
- Porky Pig filmography
- Looney Tunes and Merrie Melodies filmography (1940–1949)
- List of animated films in the public domain in the United States

Preceded by Yankee Doodle Daffy	Porky Pig Cartoons; 1943	Succeeded by A Corny Concerto

Preceded by Yankee Doodle Daffy	Daffy Duck Cartoons; 1943	Succeeded by Scrap Happy Daffy
