= My Bunny Lies over the Sea =

1948 film by Chuck Jones

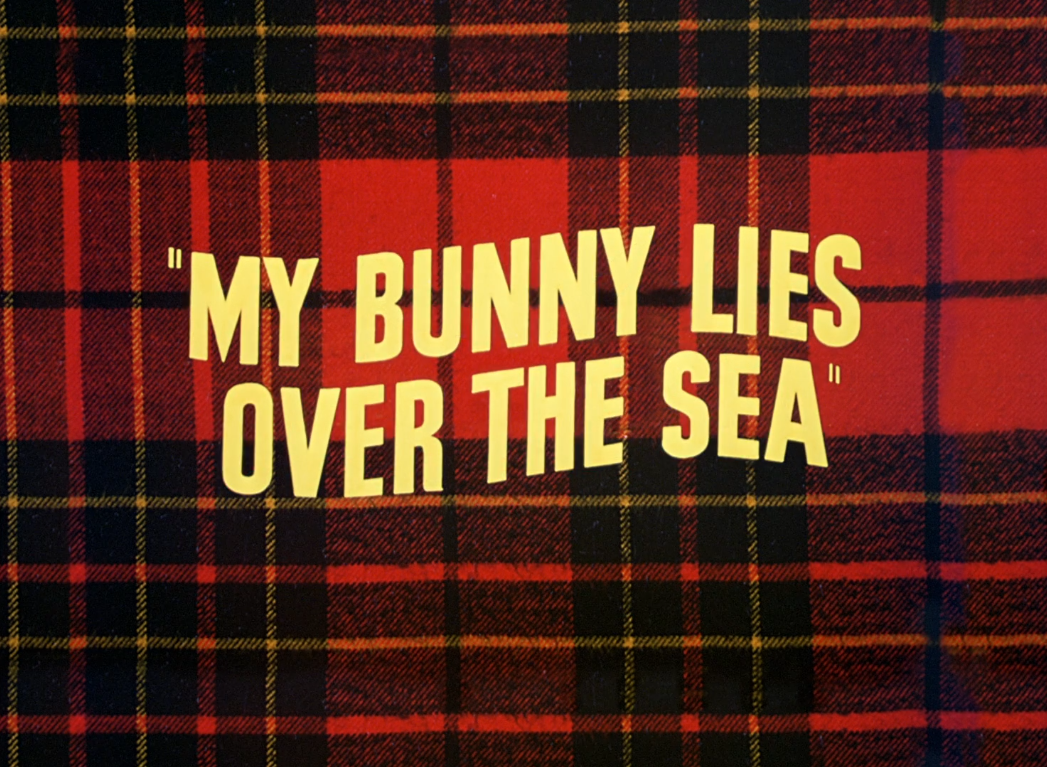
- Title card
- Directed by: Charles M. Jones
- Story by: Michael Maltese
- Starring: Mel Blanc
- Music by: Carl Stalling
- Animation by: Ken Harris; Phil Monroe; Ben Washam; Lloyd Vaughan
- Layouts by: Robert Gribbroek
- Backgrounds by: Peter Alvarado
- Color process: Technicolor
- Production company: Warner Bros. Cartoons
- Distributed by: Warner Bros. Pictures; The Vitaphone Corporation
- Release date: December 4, 1948
- Running time: 7:29
- Country: United States
- Language: English

My Bunny Lies over the Sea is a Warner Bros. Merrie Melodies cartoon, released on December 4, 1948. This theatrical cartoon was directed by Chuck Jones and written by Michael Maltese. Mel Blanc played both Bugs Bunny and the Scotsman.

The title is a play on the second line of the old song, "My Bonnie Lies over the Ocean". The seven-minute short has been released on DVD multiple times in different compilation discs, and as of 2003 is available on the Looney Tunes Golden Collection: Volume 1. Though this cartoon was the Scotsman's (named Angus MacRory) only theatrical appearance, he also made his second major role in "It's a Plaid, Plaid, Plaid, Plaid World" episode (first aired on February 3, 1996) in The Sylvester and Tweety Mysteries. The Scotsman appeared briefly in a 1989 TV special and on a couple of Animaniacs episodes. He can also be seen in the 1996 hit film, Space Jam, watching the Toon Squad/Michael Jordan basketball game.

== Plot ==
Bugs Bunny is tunneling to his vacation spot and accidentally ends up near Loch Lomond, Scotland instead of the La Brea Tar Pits, where he mistakes a Highlander named Angus MacRory playing the bagpipes for a lady being attacked by a monster. Bugs jumps MacRory, trying to rescue the "woman", and in the process he smashes the bagpipes to pieces.

Belatedly, Bugs figures out that MacRory is actually a man, fits him with a barrel and straps, claiming that wearing "a skirt" as a man is indecent, and then asks him for directions. When the outraged Scotsman replies that this is Scotland and brandishes a blunderbuss, Bugs dives back into his hole and comes back out disguised as an elderly Scotsman, accusing MacRory of trespassing on his property. MacRory doesn't believe him and challenges him to a game of golf. ("Have it your wave, Mac," the rabbit obliges. "But don'cha get tired'a runnin' dem 18 bases?")

Throughout the golf game, Bugs continually cheats on the Scotsman and then declares himself the winner. MacRory angrily denounces the rabbit's cheating, but Bugs defends himself with a list of fake "historical" citations. MacRory concedes defeat, but still claims that he can't be beaten when it comes to playing bagpipes, and he grabs the instrument to demonstrate. After playing, he dares Bugs to try outperforming him. Bugs dresses like a Scot playing not only the pipes, but also a trombone, a saxophone, a trumpet, two clarinets, cymbals on his feet, and a bass drum on his head with the beaters tied to his ears, all at the same time.

== Censorship ==
The version of this cartoon shown on CBS in the 1970s/1980s cut the part where Angus MacRory shoots his rifle at Bugs and the bullet falls, MacRory picks it up and asides to the audience that "It's been in the family for years," due to gun violence and the stereotype of the "thrifty Scotsman".

== Other appearances ==
- Bugs Bunny's Wild World of Sports: In this 1989 TV special, the Scotsman from the cartoon appears as a guest at the "Sportsman of the Year" awards banquet, as one of the nominees for the award. He is named by his full name for the first time when the announcer introduces him as, "That great Scottish golfer, Angus MacRory." Angus corrects the pronunciation of his name, and adds that it's spelled, "With fourteen r's." The special also shows clips from My Bunny Lies Over the Sea.
- The Sylvester and Tweety Mysteries: The Scotsman from the cartoon makes his second major role in the "It's a Plaid, Plaid, Plaid, Plaid World" episode. His full name, "Angus MacRory" is confirmed. He is revealed to be Granny's fourth cousin twice removed.
- Animaniacs: In the Dot's Quiet Time segment, when Dot is in Scotland, having finally found a quiet place, the Scotsman walks by Dot playing his bagpipes, disturbing her. In the Hurray for Slappy segment, he can be spotted both in the banquet hall and in the crowd at the end of the short.
- Space Jam: The Scotsman from the cartoon can be spotted on the bleachers watching the basketball playoff between the Tune Squad and the Monstars.

== See also ==
- Bugs Bunny filmography
- Looney Tunes and Merrie Melodies filmography (1940–1949)

Preceded by A-Lad-In His Lamp	Bugs Bunny Cartoons; 1948	Succeeded by Hare Do
