= 14 Carrot Rabbit =

1952 short film by Friz Freleng

- Title card
- Directed by: I. Freleng
- Story by: Warren Foster
- Starring: Mel Blanc
- Music by: Carl Stalling
- Animation by: Virgil Ross; Arthur Davis; Manuel Perez; Ken Champin
- Layouts by: Hawley Pratt
- Backgrounds by: Irv Wyner
- Production company: Warner Bros. Cartoons
- Distributed by: Warner Bros. Pictures; The Vitaphone Corporation
- Release date: March 15, 1952
- Running time: 7:13
- Country: United States
- Language: English

14 Carrot Rabbit is a 1952 Warner Bros. Looney Tunes animated cartoon short directed by Friz Freleng. The short was released on March 15, 1952, and features Bugs Bunny and Yosemite Sam (here calling himself Chilkoot Sam). The title is a play on "14 karat", as in a purity level for gold.

== Plot ==
Set during the Klondike Gold Rush in Yukon, Canada, Yosemite Sam steals gold from an old prospector named Louie. Disappointed by his small haul, Sam encounters Bugs Bunny, who undergoes an involuntary convulsing spell in presence of gold. Sam tries to trick Bugs into a partnership, but Bugs outsmarts him. Bugs claims to find gold, Sam chases him away and dissolves the partnership. Despite this, Bugs still tries to save Sam when he realizes he's about to fall off a cliff in to a lake. Bugs later sets Sam up to dig in a spot that's in fact the back of a hidden dump truck, which he dumps off of a cliff. Angered, Sam vows revenge and chases Bugs across the United States until Bugs leads him to Fort Knox, where Sam is arrested for attempting to steal the fort's gold. Bugs suddenly finds himself challenged by another guard to explain his presence on the fort grounds, and he escapes on a passing ocean liner that appears out of nowhere.

== Home media ==
This short is available on disc 1 of the Looney Tunes Golden Collection: Volume 5 DVD set.

== See also ==
- Looney Tunes and Merrie Melodies filmography (1950–1959)
- List of Bugs Bunny cartoons
- List of Yosemite Sam cartoons

Preceded by Foxy by Proxy	Bugs Bunny Cartoons; 1952	Succeeded by Water, Water Every Hare
