= Of Fox and Hounds =

1940 film by Fred Avery

- Original title card
- Directed by: Fred Avery
- Story by: Dave Monahan
- Produced by: Leon Schlesinger
- Starring: Fred Avery; Mel Blanc
- Music by: Carl W. Stalling
- Animation by: Charles McKimson
- Color process: Technicolor
- Production company: Leon Schlesinger Productions
- Distributed by: Warner Bros. Pictures
- Release date: December 7, 1940
- Running time: 9 min
- Country: United States
- Language: English

Of Fox and Hounds is a 1940 American animated comedy short film directed by Fred Avery. It was released on December 7, 1940. It is part of the Merrie Melodies series and the first cartoon to feature Willoughby, who was voiced by Avery as a parody of Lon Chaney Jr.'s performance of Lennie Small in Of Mice and Men (1939). It was re-released as a "Blue Ribbon" reissue in 1944 and 1954, rendering the original film lost; Avery kept a nitrate fragment of the original titles, which was sold by his family in 2004 to a private collector, but still available publicly at extremely low definition. The crew members' names were intentionally written as draft numbers in the credits.

== Plot ==
A rich man goes fox hunting and calls for his basset hounds, who all follow quickly except for Willoughby, who emerges to find them gone. He runs in a straight line with his hind legs in front until he runs into a tree.

Willoughby runs into George the fox, who is amused by Willoughby's stupidity and directs him into falling off a cliff. Willoughby realizes George is a fox, but then falls for George's tricks again when he dons a dog costume, despite George saying his name and having the same voice. George removes the costume by pretending to be stuck in a log.

As Willoughby chases George, he steps on a bear and traps George in a cave. He cowers on a tree after finding the bear attacking him. George lights a match at the bear's foot, causing it to flee in pain. Willoughby thanks George but passes out; George brings him home and hides there. George directs him to fall off the same cliff again, but lands safely on mattresses at the same location and relaxes there.

== Voice cast ==
- Mel Blanc as George the Fox
- Tex Avery as Willoughby the Dog

== Home media ==
- The Golden Age of Looney Tunes Laserdisc, Volume 2, Side 9
- Disc 1 of the Region 2 PAL 5-DVD set "La collection Tex Avery", published in France in 2010, along with two other bonus Warner Brothers cartoons by him, Dangerous Dan McFoo on Disc 2 and with Aviation Vacation on Disc 4.
- Looney Tunes Collector's Vault: Volume 1 Blu-ray, disc 1

== See also ==
- George and Junior
- Foxy by Proxy, a quasi-remake with Bugs Bunny replacing the fox
