= Yankee Doodle Daffy =

1943 film by Isadore Freleng

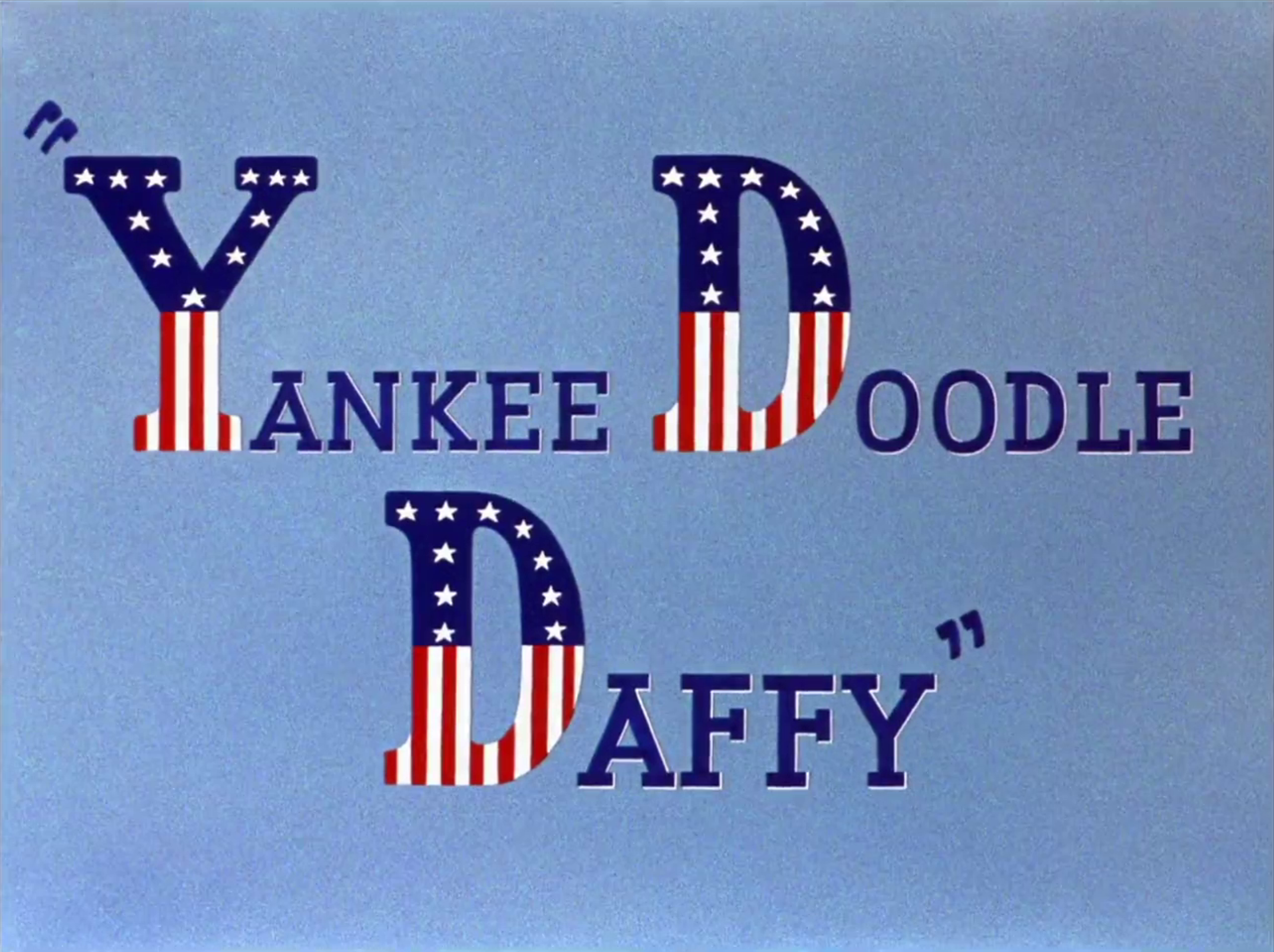
- Title card
- Directed by: Isadore Freleng
- Story by: Tedd Pierce
- Produced by: Leon Schlesinger
- Starring: Mel Blanc; Ken Bennett
- Music by: Carl W. Stalling
- Animation by: Richard Bickenbach
- Color process: Technicolor
- Production company: Leon Schlesinger Productions
- Distributed by: Warner Bros. Pictures
- Release date: July 3, 1943
- Running time: 6 min
- Country: United States
- Language: English

Yankee Doodle Daffy is a 1943 American animated comedy short film directed by Isadore Freleng. It was released on July 3, 1943. It is part of the Looney Tunes series, the 101st cartoon to star Porky Pig and the 21st cartoon to star Daffy Duck.

== Plot ==
At Smeller's Productions, Porky Pig, a producer, loaded down with luggage and a golf bag, hangs a sign on his office door reading "No casting today" and leaves his office in a hurry to board an airplane to a golf course. However, Daffy Duck, a talent agent, stops Porky from leaving, wanting to secure an audition for his client, droopy-eyed child performer Sleepy Lagoon. The pitch, intended to demonstrate Sleepy's allegedly wide and varied repertoire, consists of Daffy himself performing an array of musical and stage acts in his usual, absurd and unoriginal fashion. Sleepy meanwhile stays seated, nonchalantly licking an enormous lollipop and silently commenting on Daffy's ludicrous behavior using signs bearing rebuses, such as "ham" ("excessively theatrical"), "screwball" ("crazy and absurd"), and "corn" ("corny").

Porky, with mounting frustration (as it is his day off), repeatedly tries to escape from the pitch. Daffy handily foils each attempt in increasingly improbable ways, including by turning out to be the pilot of Porky's plane and then turning out to be the parachute Porky uses to escape the plane. After Daffy finally takes it upon himself to harass Porky with an outrageous finale, Porky decides to just get it over with by allowing Sleepy to audition.

Sleepy calmly leaves his seat and begins to sing the song, "In the Garden of My Heart" (a WB-owned song by Roma and Ball), in a strong, operatic baritone that is not only surprising given his small stature and infantile behavior but also substantially more dramatic than any of the acts Daffy used in the pitch. However, he suffers a heart attack while finishing the final line.

== Voice Cast ==
- Mel Blanc as Daffy Duck / Porky Pig / Sleepy LaGoon (coughing effects)
- Ken Bennett as Sleepy LaGoon

== Home media ==
- VHS 1988 - Cartoon Moviestars: Daffy! - MGM/UA Home Video
- Laserdisc 1988 - Cartoon Moviestars: Daffy! & Porky! - MGM/UA Home Video
- Laserdisc 1992 - The Golden Age of Looney Tunes: Volume 2 - MGM/UA Home Video
- VHS 2001 - Looney Tunes: The Collector's Edition, Vol. 14 - Cartoon Superstars - Warner Home Video/Columbia House
- DVD 2003 - Yankee Doodle Dandy (extra, unrestored) - Warner Home Video
- DVD 2003 - Looney Tunes Golden Collection: Volume 1 (restored) - Warner Home Video
- Blu-Ray 2014 - Yankee Doodle Dandy (extra, restored) - Warner Archive Collection

== See also ==
- Yankee Doodle Dandy, a 1942 American biographical musical film starting James Cagney, Joan Leslie, Walter Huston, and Richard Whorf.
- Daffy Duck filmography
- Porky Pig filmography
- Looney Tunes and Merrie Melodies filmography (1940–1949)
- List of animated films in the public domain in the United States

== Sources ==
- Shull, Michael S.; Wilt, David E. (2004), "Appendix E.", Doing Their Bit: Wartime American Animated Short Films, 1939-1945, McFarland & Company, ISBN 978-0786481699

Preceded by Confusions of a Nutzy Spy	Porky Pig Cartoons; 1943	Succeeded by Porky Pig's Feat

Preceded by The Wise Quacking Duck	Daffy Duck Cartoons; 1943	Succeeded by Porky Pig's Feat
