= Hare Splitter =

- Title card
- Directed by: I. Freleng
- Story by: Tedd Pierce
- Starring: Mel Blanc; Sara Berner
- Music by: Carl Stalling
- Animation by: Ken Champin; Gerry Chiniquy; Manuel Perez; Virgil Ross
- Layouts by: Hawley Pratt
- Backgrounds by: Paul Julian
- Color process: Technicolor
- Production company: Warner Bros. Cartoons
- Distributed by: Warner Bros. Pictures
- Release date: September 25, 1948
- Running time: 7:08
- Language: English

Hare Splitter is a 1948 Warner Bros. Merrie Melodies animated short directed by Friz Freleng. The short was released on September 25, 1948, and features Bugs Bunny. The title is a play on "hair splitting", or focusing too much on fine details, reflecting how Bugs (a "hare") tries to "split up" Casbah and Daisy Lou so Bugs can date her himself.

== Plot ==
Bugs Bunny and his next door neighbor, Casbah, are preparing to go on a date with Daisy Lou; but a fight for Daisy Lou begins as soon as Casbah and Bugs exit their rabbit holes. Bugs and Casbah both leave their holes with flowers for Daisy Lou. Seeing each other's gifts, they try to outdo each other with bigger and better gifts. Bugs finally throws an anvil on Casbah's head to get rid of him.

When Bugs arrives at Daisy Lou's home, he finds a note on her door saying she went shopping and will be back shortly. Bugs sees Casbah coming and dresses up as Daisy Lou. He lures Casbah over to the porch swing and starts toying around with him. When Casbah isn't looking, Bugs hits him over the head, puts a mouse trap down, and gives him an explosive joke carrot.

After being tricked other times, especially one where Bugs disguises as Cupid and shoots him in the butt with an arrow, Casbah learns the trick and chases Bugs who manages to escape into Daisy Lou's house and slam the door on Casbah's face.

Casbah sees Daisy Lou coming up the porch and thinks it is again Bugs dressed up as her. When Daisy Lou enters the house, Casbah hits her upside the head with a giant vase. Daisy Lou screams and proceeds to furiously assault Casbah with other vases (one of which is provided to her by Bugs), throwing the last one after him as he flees.

After flattering her, Bugs then kisses Daisy Lou after she unknowingly eats an explosive joke carrot. Both Bugs and Daisy Lou think that the explosive effect the carrot gives to the kiss is due to the other's romantic skills, and they jump wildly and enthusiastically into passionately kissing again.

== See also ==
- Bugs Bunny filmography
- Looney Tunes and Merrie Melodies filmography (1940–1949)
- Lola Bunny

Preceded by Hot Cross Bunny	Bugs Bunny Cartoons; 1948	Succeeded by A-Lad-In His Lamp
