= A-Lad-In His Lamp =

1948 cartoon directed by Robert McKimson

- Title card
- Directed by: Robert McKimson
- Story by: Warren Foster
- Based on: One Thousand and One Nights by Czendze Ormonde
- Starring: Mel Blanc; Jim Backus (uncredited)
- Music by: Carl W. Stalling
- Animation by: Charles McKimson; Phil DeLara; Manny Gould; John Carey; A.C. Gamer (effects animation)
- Layouts by: Cornett Wood
- Backgrounds by: Richard H. Thomas
- Color process: Technicolor
- Production company: Warner Bros. Cartoons
- Distributed by: Warner Bros. Pictures; The Vitaphone Corporation
- Release date: October 23, 1948 (U.S.)
- Running time: 7 minutes
- Country: United States
- Language: English

A-Lad-In His Lamp is a 1948 Warner Bros. Looney Tunes cartoon directed by Robert McKimson. The short stars Bugs Bunny, and features the genie and Caliph Hassan Pfeffer, who is after Bugs and the genie in his lamp. The voices of Bugs and Caliph Hassan Pfeffer are performed by Mel Blanc, and the voice of the genie is provided by Jim Backus. The cartoon is a takeoff of the story of Aladdin's Lamp. Elements of this short would later be re-used for the Arabian era in Bugs Bunny & Taz: Time Busters.

== Plot ==
Bugs finds Aladdin's lamp while digging a rabbit hole; believing that it is junk, he starts to clean it, rubbing off the dirt so that he can use it as an ashtray. A genie appears and tells him to make a wish. Calling him "Smokey," Bugs reluctantly starts to make multiple wishes, only to be interrupted by the genie each time. Bugs ultimately requests two Carrots, which the genie produces.

"Smokey" remarks that he wants to return to his home in Baghdad, and Bugs, imagining how fabulous it must be, remarks to himself that he wishes that he could go to Baghdad. Interpreting it as an actual wish, the genie then puts Bugs in the lamp and fires him from it like a cannon, and the two fly off to Baghdad. As they arrive, Bugs sputters and 'conks out,' and he and the lamp fall into the Royal Palace of Caliphate Hassan Pfeffer, angering the caliph, who then wants the lamp. When Bugs refuses, the caliph threatens Bugs at swordpoint, and a chase ensues, during which Bugs' attempts to enlist the lazy genie's help fail.

Bugs eventually tries to escape from the caliph by taking a magic carpet rigged with an outboard motor. When Bugs tries to draw the genie again he drives the genie's date (a female genie) away; the genie becomes extremely angry and warns Bugs saying, "If you disturb me once more, I'll beat you to a pulp." The carpet's motor runs out of gas, and Bugs crash-lands back into the palace, and the caliph now has possession of the lamp. When the caliph tries to draw the genie out of the lamp, in spite of Bugs' warning not to do it, the genie emerges, larger and angrier than before, and beats the caliph to a pulp, making good on his threat if he was bothered again.

Cheering Bugs on his victory, he grants Bugs a wish as a celebration. He whispers to "Smokey," who produces a ball that becomes a puff of smoke when dropped. The scene concludes showing Bugs as a caliph himself, surrounded by a harem of female rabbits, and wondering "what the poor rabbits are doing this season."

== Home media ==
A-Lad-In His Lamp was released on the Warner Home Video laserdisc Wince Upon A Time, and the VHS releases Bugs Bunny's Hare Raising Tales and Looney Tunes Collector's Edition: Daffy Doodles. It was released in a restored form on the Blu-ray Looney Tunes Collector's Vault: Volume 2.

== Depiction of Middle Easterners ==
This short was the earliest in the Bugs Bunny series to be set in either the Middle East or North Africa, and the first to feature Arabs or Islam. In this case, the setting is Baghdad, depicted with Las Vegas–style flashy signs and desert-like streets. Also depicted is the used rug lot of Mad Man Hassan, where people can sell their magic carpets. The scene soon shifts to the palace of Caliph Hassan Pfeffer, built on a G.I. loan, a mortgage loan for veterans guaranteed by the federal government of the United States.

The caliph is depicted as a lazy man, reclining on pillows and smoking a hookah. When he discovers the magic lamp of Aladdin, his expression turns to "child-like glee" and his motive for the rest of the short is greed. His facial expressions during the pursuit of the lamp tend toward the grotesque, while he is waving a big sword and growling. As do Middle Eastern villains in other Looney Tunes shorts, he has bushy eyebrows, moustache and beard which enhance his physically intimidating presence.

For all the menace of their weapons (often swords), they are inept in using them and easily manipulated by the "Western hero" Bugs. Also lacking are depictions of diligence and productivity in the Middle East, thus portraying the Middle East as being a cultural backwater, unaffected by modernity.

In 1991 when the short was one of 120 Looney Tunes being shown in AMC Theatres nationwide prior to, and during, the Gulf War; Warner Bros. responded to criticism from Casey Kasem, voice artist and radio personality of Arab descent, by issuing the following statement:

"To see the short is to recognize it as simply a classic cartoon, produced 43 years ago, satirizing a classic children’s fairy tale, intended - as all our cartoons are - only as good-natured fun".

Vivian Boyer of Warner Bros. further clarified that "it was never intended to be a racist cartoon".

== Sources ==
- Sensoy, Özlem (2010). "Mad Man Hassan Will Buy Your Carpets!: The Bearded Curricula of Evil Muslims". In Kincheloe, Joe L.; Steinberg, Shirley R.; Stonebanks, Christopher D. (eds.). Teaching Against Islamophobia. Peter Lang Publishing Inc. ISBN 978-1-4331-0336-0.

== See also ==
- Bugs Bunny filmography
- Looney Tunes and Merrie Melodies filmography (1940–1949)

Preceded by Hare Splitter	Bugs Bunny Cartoons; 1948	Succeeded by My Bunny Lies over the Sea
