= Nutty News =

1942 film by Robert Clampett

- Title card
- Directed by: Robert Clampett
- Story by: Warren Foster
- Produced by: Leon Schlesinger
- Starring: Mel Blanc; Arthur Q. Bryan
- Music by: Carl W. Stalling
- Animation by: Virgil Ross
- Color process: Black and white
- Production company: Leon Schlesinger Productions
- Distributed by: Warner Bros. Pictures
- Release date: May 23, 1942
- Running time: 7 min
- Country: United States
- Language: English

Nutty News is a 1942 American animated comedy short film directed by Robert Clampett. The cartoon was released on May 23, 1942. It is part of the Looney Tunes series.

== Plot ==
The film

Arthur Q. Bryan, using his Elmer Fudd voice, narrates a newsreel: hunting season opens in the Rocky Mountains; a scientific study that reveals the secrets of life; fireflies in Eastern states; Frank Putty, the famous artist; and new safety signs, among other things.

== Reception ==
This 'spot-gag cartoon' is listed among the 100 greatest Looney Tunes productions.

== See also ==
- Looney Tunes and Merrie Melodies filmography (1940–1949)
- List of animated films in the public domain in the United States
