= A Corny Concerto =

1943 film by Robert Clampett

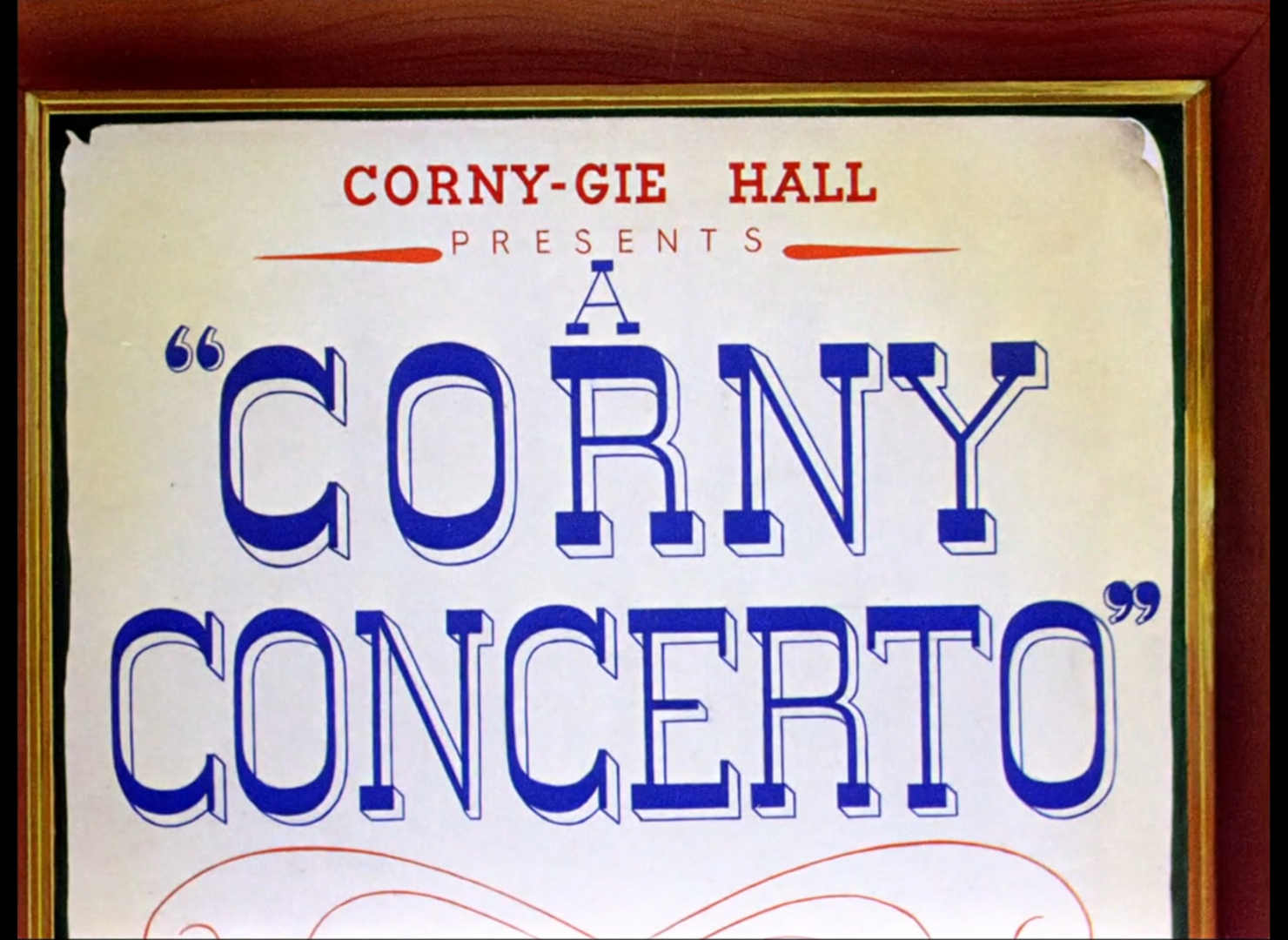
- Title card
- Directed by: Robert Clampett
- Story by: Frank Tashlin
- Produced by: Leon Schlesinger
- Music by: Carl W. Stalling
- Animation by: Robert McKimson
- Color process: Technicolor
- Production company: Leon Schlesinger Productions
- Distributed by: Warner Bros. Pictures
- Release date: September 25, 1943
- Running time: 7 min
- Country: United States
- Language: English

A Corny Concerto is a 1943 American animated comedy short film directed by Robert Clampett. The short was released on September 25, 1943. It is part of the Merrie Melodies series and stars Bugs Bunny, Porky Pig, Elmer Fudd and Daffy Duck.

They perform a parody of Walt Disney Productions' Silly Symphony cartoon series and specifically the 1940 feature Fantasia; writer Frank Tashlin worked at the studio during their production. The film uses two of Johann Strauss's best known waltzes, "Tales from the Vienna Woods" and "The Blue Danube". The only character to speak in this short is Elmer Fudd. The short entered the public domain in 1972, due to United Artists, the holder of the short at the time, failing to renew the copyright by that year.

== Plot ==
Pyotr Tchaikovsky's "Piano Concerto No. 1" is heard over the opening credits, featuring Carnegie Hall parody "Corny-gie Hall". Afterwards, a musicologist, played by Elmer Fudd appears in an ill-fitting tailcoat, unshaven and in glasses, resembling Deems Taylor in Fantasia.

The first of the two musical segments is set to Johann Strauss's waltz "Tales from the Vienna Woods". Porky Pig plays Elmer Fudd's usual role of hunter, accompanied by his hunting dog. Porky explains what he is doing via a sign reading, "I'm hunting that @!!*@ rabbit!!", which turns out to be Bugs Bunny. A series of visual gags ensue, culminating with all three characters believing that they have been shot by an angry squirrel who manages to get a hold of Porky's hunting rifle. When Porky and the dog realize that they are unharmed, they attempt to give first aid to the apparently fatally wounded Bugs while the dog bawls in tune with the music. When Porky finally pries Bugs' clenched hands off the supposed gunshot wound in his chest, Bugs is revealed to be wearing a baby blue colored bra. Emitting a scream of modesty when his face turns green, Bugs covers the bra with his left hand and slaps Porky's face with his right hand three times and caps the bra cups over the bewildered hunters' heads and then, wearing a tutu and pointe shoes, gracefully dances off into the distance, falling over at the music's climax.

Elmer returns briefly to introduce the second segment, Strauss's "The Blue Danube" waltz. In a reversal of The Ugly Duckling, a duckling resembling a young Daffy Duck attempts to join three cygnets (baby swans), who follow their mother swan, all gracefully paddling around in waltz time; the mother consistently violently rebuffs the duckling because he looks and sounds so different from her own brood. Meanwhile, a large vulture with a "hep cat" hairdo (and otherwise resembling Beaky Buzzard) spots the troupe and goes "Out To Brunch" by swooping down and sprinkling salt and pepper on the cygnets. He plucks each out of the water (the last youngster is revealed to be fitted with a tiny outboard motor), then grabs the duckling, but immediately puts him back with a sign reading "Rejected 4F" (unfit for military service); much to the duck's annoyance. Upon realizing her children are gone, the mother swan faints and the duckling becomes shocked and tries to revive her. Upon seeing the vulture making off with the cygnets, the duckling becomes angry and takes off to rescue them (on the aspect of a Curtiss P-40 fighter aircraft), and buzzes the vulture, who literally turns yellow, drops the cygnets (who parachute safely back to the water) and flees. The duckling stuns the vulture, then hands him a drum of TNT, which blows him sky high upon impact on the ground, killing the vulture. The final scene involves the grateful swan family and the duckling merrily quacking "The Blue Danube" as they glide across the water together. They wave goodbye to the audience as the cartoon ends.

== Reception ==
In 1994, A Corny Concerto was voted No. 47 of the 50 Greatest Cartoons of all time by members of the animation field. This cartoon was also listed among the 100 greatest Looney Tunes productions.

== Copyright status ==
Porky's hunting dog in the first segment of the short

The short entered the public domain in 1972, due to United Artists, the holder of the short at the time, failing to renew the copyright by that year. Bugs Bunny, Porky Pig and Elmer Fudd did not become public domain characters as a result since this short didn't debut their appearances. However, Porky's hunting dog, the vulture, and the swans did become public domain characters as they made their first and only appearance in this short.

== Home media ==
Because of the cartoon's public domain status, it can be found on budget compilations in lower quality prints, while Warner Home Video issued a restored print on disc 4 of the Looney Tunes Golden Collection: Volume 2 DVD set and disc 1 of the Looney Tunes Platinum Collection: Volume 3 Blu-ray set.

== See also ==
- Pigs in a Polka: a 1943 cartoon slapstick to the works of Johannes Brahms
- Looney Tunes and Merrie Melodies filmography (1940–1949)
- Bugs Bunny filmography
- Daffy Duck filmography
- Elmer Fudd filmography
- Porky Pig filmography
- List of animated films in the public domain in the United States

Preceded by Wackiki Wabbit	Bugs Bunny Cartoons; 1943	Succeeded by Falling Hare

Preceded by Scrap Happy Daffy	Daffy Duck Cartoons; 1943	Succeeded by Daffy-The Commando

Preceded by To Duck or Not To Duck	Elmer Fudd Cartoons; 1943	Succeeded by An Itch in Time

Preceded by Porky Pig's Feat	Porky Pig Cartoons; 1943	Succeeded by Tom Turk and Daffy
