= All This and Rabbit Stew =

1941 film by Fred Avery

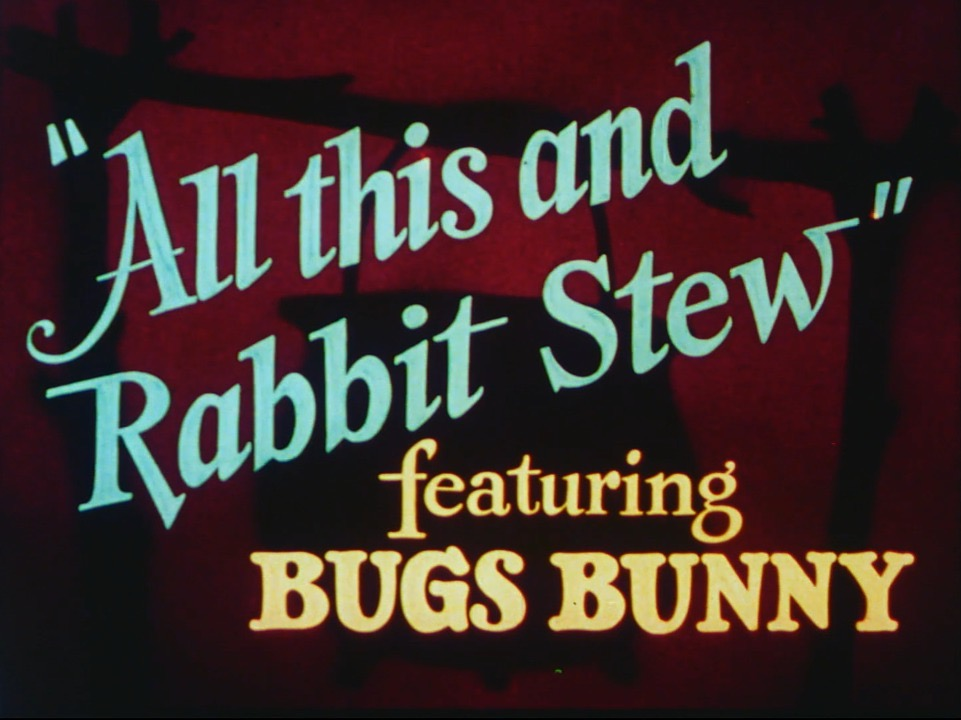
- Title card
- Directed by: Fred Avery
- Story by: Dave Monahan
- Produced by: Leon Schlesinger
- Music by: Carl W. Stalling
- Animation by: Virgil Ross
- Color process: Technicolor
- Production company: Leon Schlesinger Productions
- Distributed by: Warner Bros. Pictures
- Release date: September 13, 1941
- Running time: 6 min
- Country: United States
- Language: English

All This and Rabbit Stew is a 1941 American animated comedy short film directed by Fred Avery. The cartoon was released on September 13, 1941. It is part of the Merrie Melodies series and the tenth cartoon to feature Bugs Bunny. Avery was not credited as he had left the studio before its release. The title is a parody of the film All This, and Heaven Too (1940).

== Plot ==
An unnamed African American hunter tries to catch Bugs Bunny, who tricks him into destroying a tree. Bugs outsmarts the hunter by using his own gun against him and tickling him. Then, Bugs leads the hunter into a cave where they encounter a bear. They both run away scared when they realize the bear is in the rabbit hole. The hunter chases Bugs with birdshot bullets, leading to a wild chase through various holes. Bugs tricks the hunter into falling off a cliff and then play the dice game craps. Bugs wins everything the hunter has and walks away wearing the clothes of the hunter, who is left naked and embarrassed.

== Voice Cast ==
- Mel Blanc as Bugs Bunny
- Darrell Payne as Black Hunter (imitation of Stepin Fetchit)

== Reception ==
Motion Picture Herald (September 13, 1941): "The little colored Sambo decides to try his hand at capturing Bugs Bunny, but meets with the same success as his predecessors. Just as he has the screwy rabbit cornered, Bugs Bunny entices him into a craps game, and little Sambo winds up a sadder and wiser hunter."

Boxoffice (September 14, 1941): "One big, long hand. That's what this Technicolor cartoon is. It shows unmistakable signs of extra effort, preparation and ingenuity in all departments. The central character, a little bitty colored Sambo, is a cinch to capture fun-loving audiences. Here he decides to go gunning for some rabbits. He meets up with a nimble-witted adversary that has little Sambo in a constant dither."

Motion Picture Exhibitor (September 17, 1941): "Sambo, a little negro boy, goes rabbit hunting, meets cynical Bugs Bunny, the screwy rabbit... This is a very funny reel in every respect—characters, situations, and story. If the feature is heavy or not so good, this will make the customers feel good anyhow."

The Film Daily (September 12, 1941): "A Bugs Bunny Howl: Having eluded Hiawatha and other Leon Schlesinger characters, Bugs Bunny this time is pursued by Sambo in a riotous short that will make anyone laugh, and laugh hard. Trying to describe the action would be like trying to explain a maise but the Technicolor cartoon is about as mirth provoking as anything has any right to be."

== Controversy and Later Status ==
In 1968, during the Civil rights movement; United Artists - then owners of the Pre-August 1948 color Warner Bros. cartoon library - decided to permanently ban All This and Rabbit Stew and eleven other Looney Tunes and Merrie Melodies shorts predominately featuring African-American stereotypes from ever bever being broadcast on television again. These eleven shorts eventually began being colloquially referred to as the Censored Eleven. All subsequent owners Pre-1948 Warner cartoon library - MGM, Turner Entertainment and Warner Bros - have upheld United Artist's ban on All This and Rabbit Stew and the other entries in the Censored Eleven.

In 2001, All This and Rabbit Stew was one of 12 Bugs Bunny cartoons to be pulled from Cartoon Network's "June Bugs" marathon - by order of then parent company AOL Time Warner due to racial stereotyping.

As of 2026, like all the other enteries in the Censored Eleven, All This and Rabbit Stew has never been offically released on any home media format. All This and Rabbit Stew, along with the rest of the Censored Eleven, were the only Looney Tunes and Merrie Melodies shorts in the Associated Artists Productions library omitted from The Golden Age of Looney Tunes laserdisc box-sets by MGM/UA Home Video. While a brief clip of All This and Rabbit Stew was used in the documentary featurette King-Size Comedy: Tex Avery and the Looney Tunes Revolution on Looney Tunes Platinum Collection: Volume 2 - the cartoon has never been released in its entirety on DVD or Blu-Ray by Warner Bros. Home Entertainment.

Despite the permanent ban on All This and Rabbit Stew; in 1969 United Artists failed to renew the short's copyright after 28 years under the Copyright Act of 1909 - therefore the short entered the public domain. Thus, All This and Rabbit Stew has been widely available on several unauthorised public domain releases such as the 50 of the Greatest Cartoons VHS by Starmaker Entertainment and Cartoon Craze Presents: Bugs Bunny: Falling Hare DVD by Digiview Productions. All This and Rabbit Stew can also be widely viewed on YouTube.

== See also ==
- List of animated films in the public domain in the United States
- Bugs Bunny filmography
- Looney Tunes and Merrie Melodies filmography (1940–1949)

== Citation ==
- "Did Bugs Bunny appear in a racist cartoon during World War II?". The Straight Dope. February 5, 2002.

Preceded by The Heckling Hare	Bugs Bunny Cartoons; 1941	Succeeded by Wabbit Twouble
