= Wiener Blut (waltz) =

1873 waltz by Johann Strauss II

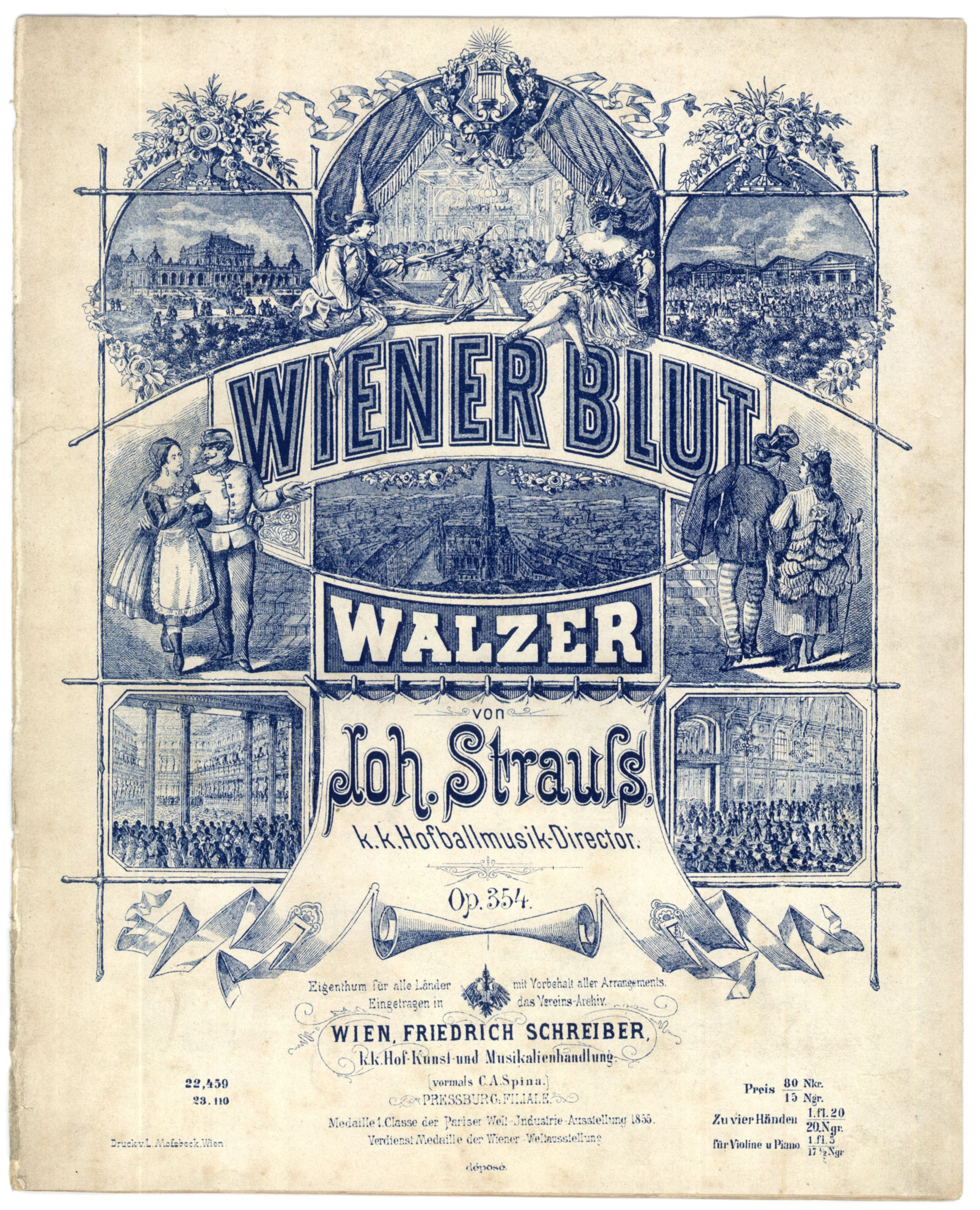
Cover

A section from Wiener Blut (2:58)

Wiener Blut ('Viennese Blood', 'Vienna Blood' or 'Viennese Spirit') Op. 354 is a waltz by Johann Strauss II first performed by the composer on 22 April 1873. The new dedication waltz was to celebrate the wedding of the Emperor Franz Joseph I's daughter Archduchess Gisela Louise Maria and Prince Leopold of Bavaria. However, the waltz was also chiefly noted by Strauss' biographers as the début of Strauss with the Vienna Philharmonic Orchestra where for many years, the Philharmonic had dismissed any association with the 'Waltz King' as it had not wished to be associated with mere 'light' or 'pops' music. The festival ball celebrating the event was held at the Musikverein Hall which is the venue for the present day Neujahrskonzert.

'Wiener Blut' is one of a handful of late works by Strauss that were not composed for the stage; at this point in his career he was concentrating on writing for the performing stage, and not for the ballroom, and had written at least two operettas before penning this waltz, with Die Fledermaus still to come.

== Description ==
The waltz begins with a high spirited melody in C major with references to later waltz sections briefly played. It is the gentle first waltz melody which is instantly recognisable, with lyrical grace and an enthusiasm not apparent in his earlier light-hearted creations. Waltz 2A is rather more subdued although waltz 2B uplifts the mood to the one listeners would be familiar with since the beginning of the piece. As a composition befitting the wedding of royalty, the waltz has its moments of grandeur (Section 3) where a triumphant melody in the home key of C major gave way into a rousing Viennese tune in F major. The waltz has only 4 two-part sections as opposed to the earlier pattern of 5 two-part sections propounded by Josef Lanner and his father Johann Strauss I. The fourth section begins quietly in F major, with a climax with cymbals to come. The coda recalls earlier sections (2 and 3) in a different key of E major before the first waltz theme comes in again. The finale is exciting, with a stirring timpani drumroll and a strong brass flourish.

== In popular culture ==
- Vienna Blood is a 1942 German film based on the operetta; the waltz of the same name features prominently in the movie.
- It is a recurring motif in the 1936 film Ladies in Love
- It is a running motif in the 1941 Alfred Hitchcock film Suspicion.
- In the 1945 anti-Nazi cartoon Herr Meets Hare, Bugs Bunny (dressed as Brünhilde) and Hermann Göring (dressed as Siegfried) dance to the song.
- An album (1997) by Austrian Neue Deutsche Härte band Stahlhammer
- A song composed by German Neue Deutsche Härte band Rammstein from the album Liebe ist für Alle Da (2009) Liebe ist für alle da
- The waltz is danced to during a high society ball in the season 3 finale of the series The Gilded Age
