= Herr Meets Hare =

1945 film by Friz Freleng

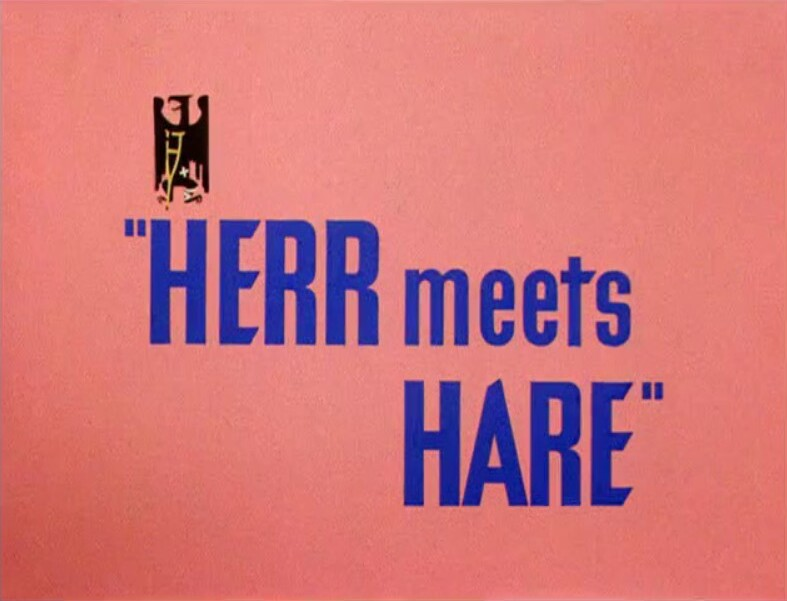
- Title card
- Directed by: Friz Freleng
- Story by: Michael Maltese
- Starring: Mel Blanc
- Music by: Carl W. Stalling
- Animation by: Gerry Chiniquy; Additional animation: Jack Bradbury; Manuel Perez; Virgil Ross; Richard Bickenbach; Ken Champin
- Color process: Technicolor
- Production company: Warner Bros. Cartoons
- Distributed by: Warner Bros. Pictures; The Vitaphone Corporation
- Release date: January 13, 1945
- Running time: 7:15
- Language: English

Herr Meets Hare is a 1945 Merrie Melodies anti-Nazi propaganda animated short directed by Friz Freleng. The short was released on January 13, 1945 during World War II, and features Bugs Bunny. This short, released not long before the collapse of the Third Reich, was the penultimate wartime themed cartoon from Warner Bros. Cartoons (Draftee Daffy was the last) being released just under four months before Victory in Europe Day.

== Plot ==
The cartoon opens with a faux Walter Winchell-like voice discussing the end of the Third Reich, saying that "Germany has been battered into a fare-thee-well", and musing about where the high leadership, and "Fatso" Göring in particular has gone. The scene soon cuts to the Black Forest, where Hermann Göring—in bemedalled lederhosen—is "soothing his jangled nerves" marching while on a hunt. Nearby, a furrow in the ground appears, with a hole at the end.

Bugs pops out of the hole, and sees no sign of the Black Forest on his map. (Variants of this scene would be used in later cartoons as the lead-in to the joke that Bugs, while tunneling underground, did indeed turn wrong somewhere in New Mexico, usually by not taking a left turn at Albuquerque. This cartoon is the first time Bugs says the popular catchphrase "I knew I shoulda made dat left toin at Albakoikie!") The other is Bugs asks Göring about the directions to Las Vegas, oblivious to his location. Göring is almost tricked into going to Las Vegas, but then quickly realizes, "Las Veegas? Why, there is no Las Veegas in Germany!" before he fires his musket at Bugs. Genuinely alarmed by his mistaken destination, Bugs hightails it. Göring chases after the rabbit, trying to suck Bugs out of his hole with his musket as a plunger.

A few chase gags go by in which Bugs insults the integrity of Göring's medals by bending one with his teeth. Suckered into bending one himself, Göring declares them ersatz and mumbles all sorts of anti-Hitler sentiments ("Oh, do I hate that Hitler swine, that phony fuehrer, that…"). Bugs masquerades as Adolf Hitler after smearing on some mud, and faces the surprised Göring. Göring disappears off-screen in a flash to change into his Nazi uniform adorned with all sorts of medals. After the usual Nazi salute, Bugs berates him in faux German as he rips all of the medals off Göring's uniform ("Klooten-flooten-blooten-pooten-meirooten-tooten!"), quickly followed by his belt. Göring "kisses" in reverence, saying, "Look! I kiss mein Fuehrer's hand. I kiss right in Der Fuehrer's face!'". Afterwards, Göring exclaims "Oh, I’m a bad flooten-boy-glooten!", a variant on Warner Bros. cartoons' frequently-cited Lou Costello-type catchphrase: "I'm a bad boy!".

Later, when the jig is up, Bugs rides in on a white horse, dressed as Brünnhilde—from Wagnerian opera, to the tune of the "Pilgrims' Chorus" from Tannhäuser. Entranced, Göring responds by dressing up as Siegfried. The two dance and the music changes to Wiener Blut, before Bugs once again makes a fool of Göring and escapes.

Eventually, Göring gets a hawk to capture Bugs. Bugs, standing next to Göring asks, "Do you think he'll catch me, doc?" to which Göring replies, "Do I think he'll catch you? Why, he'll have you back here before you can say Schicklgruber." (Schicklgruber was the original surname of Hitler's father Alois.) Bugs runs off and jumps into his rabbit hole, but as he falls down the hole, the hawk, which imitates Jimmy Durante, catches Bugs in a bag, capturing him. Göring brings the bag to Hitler, who plays solitaire in front of a map depicting the decline of Fortress Europe. Göring identifies the captive in the bag as "Bugsenheimer Bunny" (as opposed to "Weisenheimer", or "wise guy") to Der Fuehrer. (Note: During this final sequence, realistic hand prints are visible on a wall map. These prints represent a signature of background artist Robert Gribbroek, who is not credited in this cartoon.) As Herr Hitler talks of the great rewards he is going to pile upon Göring for this act of heroism, he peeks inside the bag and is shocked ("Ach!! Himmel!"). Göring goes and looks inside the bag as well, to be shocked as well (again, "Ach!! Himmel!"). Out of the bag comes Bugs dressed as Joseph Stalin—complete with an enormous pipe and a large moustache—staring back at them. As the cartoon ends, Bugs glances back at the camera and asks, in a Russian accent: "Does your tobacco taste different lately?", citing an ad slogan of that era for the Sir Walter Raleigh pipe tobacco manufactured by the Brown & Williamson Tobacco Company.

== Home media ==
- VHS, LaserDisc - Cartoon Moviestars: Bugs & Daffy: The Wartime Cartoons
- LaserDisc - The Golden Age of Looney Tunes, Vol. 3, Side 2: Bugs Bunny
- DVD - Hollywood Canteen
- DVD - Looney Tunes Golden Collection: Volume 6, Disc 2
- Blu-ray - Looney Tunes Collector's Vault: Volume 3, Disc 2

== Analysis ==
The Lobby cards credits Leon Schlesinger as the producer of the short, however the cartoon itself credits Warner Bros. Cartoons rather than crediting Schlesinger. This could imply the short entered production prior to Schlesinger's departure from the studio.

Bugs dresses as Hitler to assert control over his German opponent. This is a repetition of a scene from Bugs Bunny Nips the Nips, in which Bugs dresses up as a Japanese general.

Daniel Goldmark cites the cartoon as a significant precursor to What's Opera, Doc? (1957) and a source for its visual imagery. After running off, Bugs re-enters the scene dressed as Brünnhilde. The costume includes a blonde wig with braids and a Viking-style helmet. Bugs rides on a white horse, visually based on the Clydesdale horse. Musically, the scene is accompanied by the "Pilgrim's Chorus" from the Tannhäuser (1845).

In response, Hermann Göring changes clothes. His lederhosen is replaced by a long brown loincloth. He wears a horned-type Viking helmet. The horns grow in size as if erect, as he lustfully gazes at "Brünnhilde". The duo dances to the tune of two waltzes by Johann Strauss II: "Vienna Life" and "You and You", the latter originating in Die Fledermaus (1874).

The entry of Bugs and his white horse into the scene is repeated in What's Opera, Doc?. The dance with the male suitor is, however, changed from a slapstick-rendition of the waltz to a refined ballet. The motivation of the dancers also changes. Göring is "lost in the moment" and follows his partner's lead. In the latter, the dance is part of an artistic performance.

Both cartoons were written by Michael Maltese, which may account for the similarities. In the older short, the musical references were intended as a criticism of Germany, Richard Wagner serving as "a suitable musical backdrop". The second short makes Wagner and opera itself its targets.

== Reception ==
Like other American animated cartoons, Herr Meets Hare was available to German prisoners of war in the United States, some of whom did not like it; Hans Goebler said: "You saw Hermann Göring standing there full of decorations, then all of a sudden a rabbit showed up and took all the decorations off, and stuff like that. And we didn't care for that."

== See also ==
- Bugs Bunny filmography
- Looney Tunes and Merrie Melodies filmography (1940–1949)
